= 2010–11 Superliga Femenina =

Soccer Competition

Superliga
- Season: 2010–11
- Champions: Rayo Vallecano (3rd title)
- Champions League: Rayo Vallecano
- Matches: 308
- Goals: 1,132 (3.68 per match)

The 2010–11 Superliga season will be the 23rd since its establishment. Rayo Vallecano are the defending champions, having won their 2nd title in the previous season.

== First round ==
=== Group A ===
Pos	Team	Pld	W	D	L	GF	GA	GD	Pts	Qualification	RSO	ATH	ZAR	LAG	OVI	REO	EIB	VAD
1	Real Sociedad	14	11	1	2	31	7	+24	34	Qualification to group A	—	1–1	3–0	0–1	3–0	7–0	2–0	1–0
2	Athletic Bilbao	14	11	1	2	58	8	+50	34	Qualification to group A	1–2	—	1–0	3–0	10–2	9–0	9–1	7–0
3	Prainsa Zaragoza	14	10	0	4	34	13	+21	30	Qualification to group A	1–2	0–2	—	4–1	1–0	2–0	4–1	6–0
4	Lagunak	14	8	3	3	18	12	+6	27	Qualification to group C	1–0	1–0	0–1	—	3–0	1–0	1–1	4–1
5	Oviedo Moderno	14	5	1	8	29	38	−9	16	Qualification to group B	1–3	1–4	1–2	1–1	—	2–1	9–3	4–1
6	Reocín	14	2	3	9	16	39	−23	9	Qualification to group B	0–1	0–1	1–2	1–3	3–2	—	3–2	1–1
7	Eibar	14	1	4	9	17	44	−27	7	Qualification to group B	1–2	0–1	0–4	0–0	1–3	3–3	—	2–2
8	Valladolid	14	0	3	11	12	54	−42	3	Qualification to group C	0–4	0–9	1–7	0–1	2–3	1–1	1–2	—

Source: Soccerway
Rules for classification: 1) points; 2) head-to-head points; 3) head-to-head goal difference; 4) head-to-head goals scored; 5) goal difference; 6) number of goals scored; 7) Fair-play points

=== Group B ===
Pos	Team	Pld	W	D	L	GF	GA	GD	Pts	Qualification	ESP	BAR	SGA	VAL	LEV	COL	EST	GIM
1	Espanyol	14	12	1	1	63	9	+54	37	Qualification to group A	—	3–1	4–1	4–1	3–1	2–0	4–0	10–0
2	Barcelona	14	10	1	3	40	13	+27	31	Qualification to group A	1–0	—	1–2	2–0	2–0	4–0	0–0	13–0
3	Sant Gabriel	14	9	0	5	31	29	+2	27	Qualification to group A	1–5	2–4	—	4–2	0–2	4–0	3–0	1–0
4	Valencia	14	8	0	6	29	30	−1	24	Qualification to group B	0–10	1–3	0–3	—	2–0	2–1	2–1	4–1
5	Levante	14	8	0	6	28	15	+13	24	Qualification to group C	0–2	1–2	9–0	0–1	—	3–1	2–1	2–0
6	Collerense	14	3	2	9	18	33	−15	11	Qualification to group C	3–3	1–0	2–3	0–4	0–3	—	3–3	4–0
7	L'Estartit	14	2	2	10	15	38	−23	8	Qualification to group C	0–5	2–3	0–5	0–5	1–2	2–1	—	3–0
8	Gimnàstic	14	1	0	13	6	63	−57	3	Qualification to group B	0–8	1–4	0–2	1–5	0–3	0–2	3–2	—

Source: Soccerway
Rules for classification: 1) points; 2) head-to-head points; 3) head-to-head goal difference; 4) head-to-head goals scored; 5) goal difference; 6) number of goals scored; 7) Fair-play points

=== Group C ===
Pos	Team	Pld	W	D	L	GF	GA	GD	Pts	Qualification	RAY	ATM	TOR	SEV	SPH	LPA	MGA
1	Rayo Vallecano	12	10	1	1	50	10	+40	31	Qualification to group A	—	4–1	2–0	5–1	3–1	3–0	10–1
2	Atlético Madrid	12	9	2	1	36	15	+21	29	Qualification to group A	2–2	—	1–1	5–1	4–3	2–1	5–0
3	Torrejón	12	5	4	3	11	14	−3	19	Qualification to group B	1–0	0–2	—	1–0	1–0	2–2	2–1
4	Sevilla	12	5	0	7	18	24	−6	15	Qualification to group C	0–3	0–2	5–1	—	2–3	2–4	2–0
5	Sporting Huelva	12	3	2	7	18	25	−7	11	Qualification to group B	1–3	0–4	1–1	0–2	—	1–2	2–2
6	Las Palmas	12	3	1	8	20	25	−5	10	Qualification to group C	1–3	2–4	0–1	0–1	0–3	—	7–1
7	Atlético Málaga	12	1	2	9	10	50	−40	5	Qualification to group B	1–12	1–4	0–0	0–2	1–3	2–1	—

Source: Soccerway
Rules for classification: 1) points; 2) head-to-head points; 3) head-to-head goal difference; 4) head-to-head goals scored; 5) goal difference; 6) number of goals scored; 7) Fair-play points

== Second round ==
=== Group A ===
Pos	Team	Pld	W	D	L	GF	GA	GD	Pts	Qualification	ESP	RAY	ATH	BAR	ATM	ZAR	SGA	RSO
1	Espanyol	14	10	2	2	42	14	+28	32	Qualification to the final and Copa de la Reina	—	6–1	4–0	1–0	4–0	2–1	8–0	7–0
2	Rayo Vallecano	14	9	3	2	41	20	+21	30	Qualification to the final and Copa de la Reina	6–2	—	2–1	1–0	4–2	6–2	7–0	5–0
3	Athletic Bilbao	14	9	1	4	32	15	+17	28	Qualification to the Copa de la Reina	2–0	1–1	—	0–1	4–0	6–0	6–1	3–1
4	Barcelona	14	5	4	5	13	13	0	19	Qualification to the Copa de la Reina	1–2	0–1	2–2	—	2–1	0–0	3–0	1–1
5	Atlético Madrid	14	5	2	7	17	24	−7	17	Qualification to the Copa de la Reina	1–1	0–3	1–2	0–1	—	1–0	3–1	2–1
6	Prainsa Zaragoza	14	3	2	9	20	31	−11	11	Qualification to the Copa de la Reina	1–2	3–1	0–2	1–2	0–1	—	6–3	2–0
7	Sant Gabriel	14	2	4	8	19	48	−29	10	Qualification to the Copa de la Reina	1–1	3–3	0–2	3–0	0–3	4–4	—	2–2
8	Real Sociedad	14	2	4	8	9	28	−19	10	Qualification to the Copa de la Reina	0–2	0–0	3–2	0–0	0–1	1–0	0–1	—

Source: Soccerway
Rules for classification: 1) points; 2) head-to-head points; 3) head-to-head goal difference; 4) head-to-head goals scored; 5) goal difference; 6) number of goals scored; 7) Fair-play points

=== Group B ===
Pos	Team	Pld	W	D	L	GF	GA	GD	Pts	Qualification or relegation	VAL	SPH	REO	MGA	TOR	OVI	GIM	EIB
1	Valencia	14	9	2	3	38	22	+16	29	Qualification to the Copa de la Reina	—	2–2	6–1	3–1	2–1	1–0	5–1	3–1
2	Sporting Huelva	14	8	2	4	36	20	+16	26	Qualification to the Copa de la Reina	3–2	—	6–1	1–0	3–3	2–1	4–0	3–1
3	Reocín	14	7	4	3	26	23	+3	25	Qualification to the Copa de la Reina	2–2	2–1	—	2–1	0–1	1–1	3–0	4–1
4	Atlético Málaga	14	8	1	5	21	21	0	25		4–2	4–3	1–1	—	3–0	2–1	1–0	2–1
5	Torrejón (R)	14	7	3	4	26	15	+11	24	Relegation to Segunda División	1–2	2–0	1–1	4–0	—	0–1	3–1	6–0
6	Oviedo Moderno (R)	14	7	2	5	27	15	+12	23	Relegation to Segunda División	3–2	2–1	1–2	3–0	0–1	—	5–0	6–2
7	Gimnàstic (R)	14	1	2	11	9	40	−31	5	Relegation to Segunda División	2–4	0–5	0–3	0–1	1–1	0–2	—	1–0
8	Eibar (R)	14	0	2	12	12	39	−27	2	Relegation to Segunda División	0–2	0–2	1–3	0–1	1–2	1–1	3–3	—

Source: Soccerway
Rules for classification: 1) points; 2) head-to-head points; 3) head-to-head goal difference; 4) head-to-head goals scored; 5) goal difference; 6) number of goals scored; 7) Fair-play points
(R) Relegated

=== Group C ===
Pos	Team	Pld	W	D	L	GF	GA	GD	Pts	Qualification or relegation	LEV	COL	LAG	EST	SEV	LPA	VAD
1	Levante	12	9	2	1	29	7	+22	29	Qualification to the Copa de la Reina	—	3–0	1–1	3–1	5–2	2–0	4–0
2	Collerense	12	7	2	3	22	13	+9	23	Qualification to the Copa de la Reina	0–1	—	2–1	3–1	1–1	2–1	6–1
3	Lagunak	12	7	2	3	15	11	+4	23	Qualification to the Copa de la Reina	1–0	0–3	—	3–0	1–1	2–1	1–0
4	L'Estartit	12	6	1	5	28	21	+7	19		1–2	4–1	2–1	—	1–1	7–2	3–0
5	Sevilla (R)	12	4	3	5	19	21	−2	15	Relegation to Segunda División	0–4	0–1	0–1	3–1	—	3–1	7–3
6	Las Palmas (R)	12	2	1	9	12	26	−14	7	Relegation to Segunda División	1–1	0–3	1–2	2–3	2–0	—	1–0
7	Valladolid (R)	12	1	1	10	5	31	−26	4	Relegation to Segunda División	0–3	0–0	0–1	0–4	0–1	1–0	—

Source: Soccerway
Rules for classification: 1) points; 2) head-to-head points; 3) head-to-head goal difference; 4) head-to-head goals scored; 5) goal difference; 6) number of goals scored; 7) Fair-play points
(R) Relegated

== Final ==
30 April 2011
17:30 (CET)

Rayo Vallecano	2–2	Espanyol
García 2'; Hermoso 58' (pen.)	Report	Boquete 16', 78'

Estadio Teresa Rivero, Madrid
Referee: López Puerta

Rayo Vallecano	Espanyol

GK	1	(Spain) Alicia Gómez
DF	27	(Spain) María Galán
DF	15	(Spain) Burgos
DF	21	(Spain) Míriam Diéguez	(yellow card) 4'
DF	20	(Spain) Keka		(substituted off) 68'
MF	14	(Spain) Chini
MF	16	(Spain) Ale López
MF	17	(Spain) Saray García
FW	11	(Spain) Jennifer Hermoso
FW	10	(Spain) Sonia Bermúdez	(yellow card) 28'
FW	7	(Spain) Natalia Pablos		(substituted off) 73'
Substitutes:
MF	4	(Spain) Pili		(substituted on) 68'
FW	8	(Equatorial Guinea) Jade Boho		(substituted on) 73'
Manager:
(Spain) Joserra Hernández

GK	1	(Spain) Mariajo	(yellow card) 58'
DF	2	(Spain) Ane Bergara		(substituted off) 88'
DF	6	(Spain) Lara Rabal	(yellow card) 41'	(substituted off) 75'
DF	5	(Spain) Marta Torrejón
DF	9	(Spain) Sandra Vilanova		(substituted off) 90'
MF	15	(Spain) Silvia Meseguer
MF	10	(Spain) Vanesa Gimbert
MF	19	(Spain) Erika Vázquez
MF	11	(Spain) Sara Monforte
FW	7	(Spain) Willy
FW	21	(Spain) Vero Boquete
Substitutes:
DF	3	(Mexico) Kenti Robles		(substituted on) 88'
DF	8	(Portugal) Sónia Matias		(substituted on) 90'
FW	18	(Spain) Alexia Putellas		(substituted on) 75'
Manager:
(Spain) Òscar Aja

8 May 2011
11:00 (CET)

Espanyol	1–2	Rayo Vallecano
Bergara 7'	Report	Bermúdez 15'; Hermoso 70'

Ciutat Esportiva, Sant Adrià de Besòs
Attendance: 1,200
Referee: Medié Jiménez

Espanyol	Rayo Vallecano

GK	1	(Spain) Mariajo
DF	2	(Spain) Ane Bergara		(substituted off) 71'
DF	6	(Spain) Lara Rabal		(substituted off) 56'
DF	5	(Spain) Marta Torrejón
DF	9	(Spain) Sandra Vilanova		(substituted off) 90'
MF	15	(Spain) Silvia Meseguer
MF	10	(Spain) Vanesa Gimbert	(yellow card) 52'
MF	19	(Spain) Erika Vázquez
MF	11	(Spain) Sara Monforte
FW	7	(Spain) Willy	(yellow card) 67'
MF	21	(Spain) Vero Boquete	(yellow card) 92'
Substitutes:
DF	3	(Mexico) Kenti Robles		(substituted on) 71'
DF	8	(Portugal) Sónia Matias		(substituted on) 90'
FW	18	(Spain) Alexia Putellas		(substituted on) 56'
Manager:
(Spain) Òscar Aja

GK	1	(Spain) Alicia Gómez
DF	27	(Spain) María Galán		(substituted off) 66'
DF	15	(Spain) Burgos
DF	4	(Spain) Pili
DF	21	(Spain) Míriam Diéguez
MF	14	(Spain) Chini
MF	16	(Spain) Ale López
MF	17	(Spain) Saray García	(yellow card) 38'	(substituted off) 61'
FW	11	(Spain) Jennifer Hermoso		(substituted off) 89'
FW	10	(Spain) Sonia Bermúdez
FW	7	(Spain) Natalia Pablos		(substituted off) 81'
Substitutes:
DF	3	(Spain) Mónica Fernández		(substituted on) 89'
FW	8	(Equatorial Guinea) Jade Boho		(substituted on) 61'
FW		(Spain) Paloma Lázaro		(substituted on) 66'
MF		(Spain) Ana Rubio		(substituted on) 66'
Manager:
(Spain) Joserra Hernández

Superliga champion

== Final standings ==
Pos	Team	Pld	W	D	L	GF	GA	GD	Pts	Qualification
1	Rayo Vallecano	28	20	5	3	95	33	+62	65	Qualification for the UEFA Champions League
2	Espanyol	30	22	4	4	108	27	+81	70	Qualification for the Copa de la Reina
3	Athletic Bilbao	28	20	2	6	90	23	+67	62	Qualification for the Copa de la Reina
4	Barcelona	28	15	5	8	53	26	+27	50	Qualification for the Copa de la Reina
5	Atlético Madrid	26	14	4	8	53	39	+14	46	Qualification for the Copa de la Reina
6	Prainsa Zaragoza	28	13	2	13	54	44	+10	41	Qualification for the Copa de la Reina
7	Sant Gabriel	28	11	4	13	50	77	−27	37	Qualification for the Copa de la Reina
8	Real Sociedad	28	13	5	10	40	35	+5	44	Qualification for the Copa de la Reina
9	Levante	26	17	2	7	57	22	+35	53	Qualification for the Copa de la Reina
10	Valencia	28	17	2	9	67	52	+15	53	Qualification for the Copa de la Reina
11	Collerense	26	10	4	12	40	46	−6	34	Qualification for the Copa de la Reina
12	Sporting Huelva	26	11	4	11	54	45	+9	37	Qualification for the Copa de la Reina
13	Lagunak	26	15	5	6	33	23	+10	50	Qualification for the Copa de la Reina
14	Reocín	28	9	7	12	42	62	−20	34	Qualification for the Copa de la Reina
15	L'Estartit	26	8	3	15	43	59	−16	27	
16	Atlético Málaga	26	9	3	14	31	71	−40	30	
17	Torrejón	26	12	7	7	37	29	+8	43	Relegation to Segunda División
18	Sevilla	24	9	3	12	37	45	−8	30	Relegation to Segunda División
19	Oviedo Moderno	28	12	3	13	56	53	+3	39	Relegation to Segunda División
20	Las Palmas	24	5	2	17	32	51	−19	17	Dissolved
21	Valladolid	26	1	4	21	17	85	−68	7	Dissolved
22	Gimnàstic	28	2	2	24	15	103	−88	8	Dissolved
23	Eibar	28	1	6	21	29	83	−54	9	Relegation to Segunda División

Rules for classification: 1) group A teams; 2) position in groups B and C; 3) points in second stage; 4) goals difference in second stage; 5) goals scored in second stage (3 to 5 excluding matches against 8th qualified team).

== See also ==
- 2011 Copa de la Reina
