= 2009–10 Superliga Femenina =

Superliga
- Season: 2009–10
- Champions: Rayo Vallecano (2nd title)
- Champions League: Rayo Vallecano
- Matches: 282
- Goals: 1,079 (3.83 per match)
- Top goalscorer: Adriana Martín (35 goals)

The 2009–10 Superliga season was the 22nd since its establishment. Rayo Vallecano were the defending champions, having won their title in the previous season.

== League expansion and format changes ==
On 26 May 2009, the Royal Spanish Football Federation presented a project to improve the Superliga, based in an expansion of the league from 16 to 24 teams, by inviting professional men's teams to join the tournament.

Eight teams agreed to join the league: two of them from La Liga (Sevilla and Valladolid), four from Segunda División (Las Palmas, Murcia, Gimnàstic and Eibar), one of Segunda División B (Jaén) and one from Tercera División (Cacereño). However, economical difficulties forced Cacereño and Murcia to withdraw before the start of the competition.

This project was rejected by the majority of participant clubs and players of the league. However, despite this strong opposition, on 14 July 2009, the new format was approved.

The teams were divided into three groups attending to geographical criteria. The winner and runner-up of each group and the two best third qualified teams would join the Group A in the second stage, for the title. The two first teams of the group A played the final of the league.

== First round ==
=== Group A ===
Pos	Team	Pld	W	D	L	GF	GA	GD	Pts	Qualification	ATH	ZAR	RSO	LAG	OVI	LPA	EIB	VAD
1	Athletic Bilbao	14	10	3	1	45	13	+32	33	Qualification to group A	—	0–1	2–2	3–2	4–1	4–0	5–0	6–0
2	Prainsa Zaragoza	14	10	2	2	36	6	+30	32	Qualification to group A	1–1	—	2–0	0–1	4–1	3–0	6–0	4–0
3	Real Sociedad	14	9	3	2	42	14	+28	30	Qualification to group A	2–2	3–1	—	2–2	2–1	4–0	6–0	5–0
4	Lagunak	13	6	4	3	26	13	+13	22	Qualification to group C	1–2	0–0	0–1	—	4–0	— (Note: Match suspended due to ice and not played later.)	4–1	3–1
5	Oviedo Moderno	14	6	2	6	18	22	−4	20	Qualification to group B	0–3	0–2	1–0	2–2	—	5–0	1–0	1–0
6	Las Palmas	13	3	1	9	17	35	−18	10	Qualification to group C	2–4	0–3	2–4	1–1	1–2	—	4–1	2–1
7	Eibar	14	2	1	11	9	51	−42	7	Qualification to group B	1–7	0–5	0–6	0–4	0–3	2–0	—	1–1
8	Valladolid	14	0	2	12	5	44	−39	2	Qualification to group C	0–2	0–5	0–6	0–2	0–0	1–5	1–2	—

Source: Soccerway
Rules for classification: 1) points; 2) head-to-head points; 3) head-to-head goal difference; 4) head-to-head goals scored; 5) goal difference; 6) number of goals scored; 7) Fair-play points

=== Group B ===
Pos	Team	Pld	W	D	L	GF	GA	GD	Pts	Qualification	ESP	BAR	LEV	EST	COL	VAL	GIM
1	Espanyol	12	9	2	1	50	8	+42	29	Qualification to group A	—	1–1	6–0	2–1	3–0	8–0	13–0
2	Barcelona	12	8	2	2	26	7	+19	26	Qualification to group A	1–2	—	1–0	1–0	3–1	4–1	7–0
3	Levante	12	7	3	2	21	11	+10	24	Qualification to group A	2–0	0–0	—	0–0	2–0	3–2	5–1
4	L'Estartit	12	5	2	5	26	13	+13	17	Qualification to group B	0–2	0–3	1–2	—	5–1	5–0	4–1
5	Collerense	12	4	3	5	16	20	−4	15	Qualification to group C	1–4	1–0	1–1	0–0	—	2–2	4–0
6	Valencia	12	2	2	8	16	32	−16	8	Qualification to group C	1–1	0–2	0–2	1–3	0–1	—	3–1
7	Gimnàstic	12	0	0	12	4	68	−64	0	Qualification to group C	1–8	0–4	0–3	0–7	0–4	1–5	—

Source: Soccerway
Rules for classification: 1) points; 2) head-to-head points; 3) head-to-head goal difference; 4) head-to-head goals scored; 5) goal difference; 6) number of goals scored; 7) Fair-play points

=== Group C ===
Pos	Team	Pld	W	D	L	GF	GA	GD	Pts	Qualification	RAY	ATM	SPH	TOR	SEV	MGA	JAE
1	Rayo Vallecano	12	11	1	0	65	5	+60	34	Qualification to group A	—	1–1	3–0	2–0	5–0	8–0	12–1
2	Atlético Madrid	12	7	3	2	33	16	+17	24	Qualification to group A	0–2	—	3–1	2–1	2–1	1–1	5–0
3	Sporting Huelva	12	7	0	5	32	23	+9	21	Qualification to group B	2–3	5–3	—	2–1	2–0	1–1	5–0
4	Torrejón	12	6	0	6	25	21	+4	18	Qualification to group C	1–4	1–4	5–2	—	2–1	5–0	2–0
5	Sevilla	12	4	2	6	18	27	−9	14	Qualification to group B	0–7	2–2	3–2	1–2	—	4–0	3–2
6	Atlético Málaga	12	2	2	8	8	46	−38	8	Qualification to group B	0–7	0–8	1–2	2–1	0–0	—	3–2
7	Jaén	12	1	0	11	13	56	−43	3	Qualification to group B	0–11	1–2	1–2	1–4	1–3	4–1	—

Source: Soccerway
Rules for classification: 1) points; 2) head-to-head points; 3) head-to-head goal difference; 4) head-to-head goals scored; 5) goal difference; 6) number of goals scored; 7) Fair-play points

== Second round ==
=== Group A ===
Pos	Team	Pld	W	D	L	GF	GA	GD	Pts	Qualification	ESP	RAY	ATH	ATM	BAR	ZAR	RSO	LEV
1	Espanyol	14	12	0	2	43	8	+35	36	Qualification to the final and Copa de la Reina	—	2–3	6–1	4–1	4–0	5–1	6–0	4–0
2	Rayo Vallecano	14	11	1	2	40	12	+28	34	Qualification to the final and Copa de la Reina	0–2	—	0–1	3–0	3–1	2–0	6–0	4–0
3	Athletic Bilbao	14	9	2	3	30	22	+8	29	Qualification to the Copa de la Reina	1–0	1–1	—	5–2	4–0	2–1	4–1	2–0
4	Atlético Madrid	14	5	3	6	18	23	−5	18	Qualification to the Copa de la Reina	0–1	0–3	5–1	—	0–0	2–2	2–0	3–3
5	Barcelona	14	5	2	7	16	22	−6	17	Qualification to the Copa de la Reina	0–2	1–4	2–0	0–1	—	3–1	4–0	1–0
6	Prainsa Zaragoza	14	3	3	8	18	29	−11	12	Qualification to the Copa de la Reina	1–3	0–2	2–3	1–0	2–1	—	1–1	1–3
7	Real Sociedad	14	2	3	9	13	35	−22	9	Qualification to the Copa de la Reina	0–1	3–4	1–1	0–1	1–3	2–2	—	2–0
8	Levante	14	1	2	11	8	35	−27	5	Qualification to the Copa de la Reina	0–3	1–5	1–4	0–1	0–0	0–3	0–2	—

Source: Soccerway
Rules for classification: 1) points; 2) head-to-head points; 3) head-to-head goal difference; 4) head-to-head goals scored; 5) goal difference; 6) number of goals scored; 7) Fair-play points

=== Group B ===
Pos	Team	Pld	W	D	L	GF	GA	GD	Pts	Qualification	EST	SEV	SPH	OVI	MGA	JAE	EIB
1	L'Estartit	12	11	0	1	38	10	+28	33	Qualification to the Copa de la Reina	—	3–1	1–0	5–0	8–2	3–0	3–1
2	Sevilla	12	8	2	2	27	9	+18	26	Qualification to the Copa de la Reina	2–1	—	3–1	0–1	2–0	3–0	3–0
3	Sporting Huelva	12	7	0	5	29	18	+11	21	Qualification to the Copa de la Reina	1–2	0–2	—	3–1	2–0	2–0	3–0 (Note: Match awarded to Sporting Huelva as Eibar could not travel to play the game.)
4	Oviedo Moderno	12	5	3	4	19	20	−1	18		1–3	2–2	4–1	—	1–1	3–0	2–1
5	Atlético Málaga	12	1	5	6	11	23	−12	8		1–3	0–0	1–2	1–2	—	2–2	2–2
6	Jaén	12	2	2	8	10	25	−15	8		1–2	0–2	1–4	2–1	0–0	—	4–1
7	Eibar	12	1	2	9	12	41	−29	5		0–4	0–4	3–10	1–1	0–1	2–0	—

Source: Soccerway
Rules for classification: 1) points; 2) head-to-head points; 3) head-to-head goal difference; 4) head-to-head goals scored; 5) goal difference; 6) number of goals scored; 7) Fair-play points

=== Group C ===
Pos	Team	Pld	W	D	L	GF	GA	GD	Pts	Qualification	TOR	COL	LPA	LAG	VAL	VAD	GIM
1	Torrejón	12	8	4	0	42	13	+29	28	Qualification to the Copa de la Reina	—	3–2	7–0	0–0	2–2	4–1	8–0
2	Collerense	12	6	3	3	33	21	+12	21	Qualification to the Copa de la Reina	0–4	—	4–3	0–0	2–1	5–0	6–1
3	Las Palmas	12	6	3	3	31	25	+6	21	Qualification to the Copa de la Reina	2–2	2–2	—	1–1	2–1	2–0	5–1
4	Lagunak	12	5	4	3	24	16	+8	19		1–2	4–2	2–3	—	3–1	4–0	2–0
5	Valencia	12	5	2	5	36	23	+13	17		2–2	0–3	4–1	4–2	—	7–1	6–1
6	Valladolid	12	3	2	7	18	38	−20	11		3–6	3–3	1–4	2–2	2–1	—	2–0
7	Gimnàstic	12	0	0	12	6	54	−48	0		0–2	0–4	0–6	1–3	2–7	0–3	—

Source: Soccerway
Rules for classification: 1) points; 2) head-to-head points; 3) head-to-head goal difference; 4) head-to-head goals scored; 5) goal difference; 6) number of goals scored; 7) Fair-play points

== Final ==
2 May 2010

Rayo Vallecano	1–0	Espanyol
Natalia 90'

Estadio Teresa Rivero, Madrid
Referee: Santiago Cuesta Ferreiro

Rayo Vallecano

GK	1	(Spain) Alicia Gómez
DF	16	(Spain) Ale López
DF	18	(Spain) Vanesa Gimbert
DF	5	(Spain) Chabe	(yellow card) 78'
DF	15	(Spain) Burgos
MF	20	(Spain) Keka	(yellow card) 17'	(substituted off) 68'
MF	22	(Spain) Sandra Vilanova
MF	10	(Spain) Sonia Bermúdez
MF	17	(Spain) Willy		(substituted off) 64'
FW	7	(Spain) Natalia Pablos
FW	9	(Spain) Adriana Martín
Substitutes:
DF	4	(Spain) Meli Nicolau		(substituted on) 68'
FW	19	(Equatorial Guinea) Jade Boho		(substituted on) 64'
Manager:
(Spain) Pedro Martínez Losa

GK	1	(Spain) Mariajo
DF	16	(Mexico) Kenti Robles
DF	2	(Spain) Ane Bergara	(yellow card) 20'
DF	5	(Spain) Marta Torrejón
DF	6	(Spain) Lara Rabal
MF	15	(Spain) Silvia Meseguer
MF	4	(Spain) Míriam Diéguez	(yellow card) 59'
MF	23	(Spain) Sara Mérida		(substituted off) 84'
MF	20	(Spain) Sara Monforte
FW	21	(Spain) Vero Boquete
FW	18	(Italy) Pamela Conti		(substituted off) 77'
Substitutes:
MF	10	(Sweden) Louise Fors		(substituted on) 84'
FW	19	(Spain) Mery		(substituted on) 77'
Manager:
(Spain) Òscar Aja

9 May 2010

Espanyol	1–1	Rayo Vallecano
Conti 81'		Adriana 78'

Ciutat Esportiva, Sant Adrià de Besòs
Referee: Gustavo Rebollo López

Espanyol	Rayo Vallecano

GK	1	(Spain) Mariajo
DF	16	(Mexico) Kenti Robles
DF	2	(Spain) Ane Bergara	(yellow card) 60'
DF	5	(Spain) Marta Torrejón	(yellow card) 22'
DF	6	(Spain) Lara Rabal		(substituted off) 65'
MF	20	(Spain) Sara Monforte
MF	15	(Spain) Silvia Meseguer	(yellow card) 74'
DF	4	(Spain) Míriam Diéguez
MF	23	(Spain) Sara Mérida		(substituted off) 74'
FW	21	(Spain) Vero Boquete
FW	18	(Italy) Pamela Conti	(yellow card) 81'
Substitutes:
FW	7	(Spain) Marta Corredera		(substituted on) 65'
FW	19	(Spain) Mery	(yellow card) 75'	(substituted on) 74'
Manager:
(Spain) Òscar Aja

GK	1	(Spain) Alicia Gómez	(yellow card) 80'
DF	5	(Spain) Chabe
DF	4	(Spain) Meli Nicolau	(yellow card) 38'
DF	18	(Spain) Vanesa Gimbert	(yellow card) 42'
MF	15	(Spain) Burgos
MF	20	(Spain) Keka	(yellow card) 83'
MF	22	(Spain) Sandra Vilanova
MF	17	(Spain) Willy		(substituted off) 89'
FW	10	(Spain) Sonia Bermúdez		(substituted off) 91'
FW	7	(Spain) Natalia Pablos		(substituted off) 37'
FW	9	(Spain) Adriana Martín
Substitutes:
MF	6	(Spain) Chini		(substituted on) 91'
DF	16	(Spain) Ale López		(substituted on) 89'
FW	19	(Equatorial Guinea) Jade Boho		(substituted on) 37'
Manager:
(Spain) Pedro Martínez Losa

Superliga Champion
(Community of Madrid) Rayo Vallecano

== Final standings ==
Pos	Team	Pld	W	D	L	GF	GA	GD	Pts	Qualification
1	Rayo Vallecano	28	23	3	2	107	18	+89	72	Qualification for the UEFA Champions League
2	Espanyol	28	21	3	4	94	18	+76	66	Qualification for the Copa de la Reina
3	Athletic Bilbao	28	19	5	4	75	35	+40	62	Qualification for the Copa de la Reina
4	Atlético Madrid	26	12	6	8	51	39	+12	42	Qualification for the Copa de la Reina
5	Barcelona	26	13	4	9	42	29	+13	43	Qualification for the Copa de la Reina
6	Prainsa Zaragoza	28	13	5	10	54	35	+19	44	Qualification for the Copa de la Reina
7	Real Sociedad	28	11	6	11	55	49	+6	39	Qualification for the Copa de la Reina
8	Levante	26	8	5	13	29	46	−17	29	Qualification for the Copa de la Reina
9	L'Estartit	24	16	2	6	64	23	+41	50	Qualification for the Copa de la Reina
10	Torrejón	24	14	4	6	67	34	+33	46	Qualification for the Copa de la Reina
11	Sevilla	24	12	4	8	45	36	+9	40	Qualification for the Copa de la Reina
12	Collerense	24	10	6	8	49	41	+8	36	Qualification for the Copa de la Reina
13	Sporting Huelva	24	14	0	10	61	41	+20	42	Qualification for the Copa de la Reina
14	Las Palmas	26	9	4	13	48	63	−15	31	Qualification for the Copa de la Reina
15	Lagunak	26	12	8	6	53	29	+24	44	
16	Oviedo Moderno	26	11	5	10	37	42	−5	38	
17	Valencia	24	7	4	13	52	55	−3	25	
18	Atlético Málaga	24	3	7	14	19	69	−50	16	
19	Valladolid	26	3	4	19	23	82	−59	13	
20	Jaén	24	3	2	19	23	81	−58	11	
21	Eibar	26	3	3	20	21	92	−71	12	
22	Gimnàstic	24	0	0	24	10	122	−112	0	

Rules for classification: 1) group A teams; 2) position in groups B and C; 3) points in second stage; 4) goals difference in second stage; 5) goals scored in second stage.

== See also ==
- 2010 Copa de la Reina
