= 2010 Copa de la Reina de Fútbol =

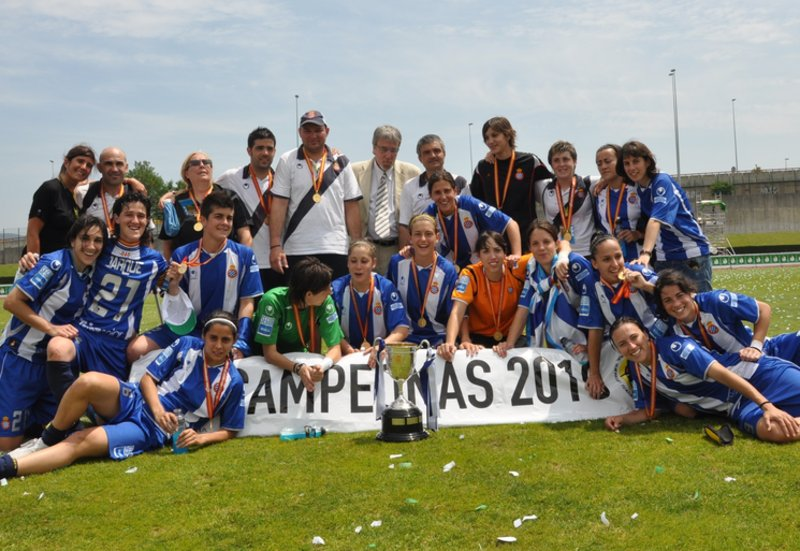
- Espanyol players celebrating the title

Tournament details
- Country: Spain
- Teams: 14

Final positions
- Champions: Espanyol (5th title)
- Runners-up: Rayo Vallecano

Tournament statistics
- Matches played: 24
- Goals scored: 83 (3.46 per match)
- Top goal scorer(s): Natalia Pablos (6 goals)

The 2010 Copa de la Reina de Fútbol was the 28th edition of the Spanish women's football cup. Espanyol won its fifth title.

== Competition format ==
The competition was played by 14 teams from the Superliga Femenina: the eight teams of the group A and the three first qualified teams of the groups B and C.

The round of 16 and the quarterfinals were played with double-leg series while the semifinals and the final were played with a Final Four format in Basauri.

== Bracket ==
Round of 16
Collerense	2	0	2
Barcelona	1	2	3
Athletic Club	7	6	13
Las Palmas	0	1	1
Prainsa Zaragoza	5	2	7
Sevilla	0	3	3
Torrejón	0	2	2
Real Sociedad	0	2	2
Atlético de Madrid	1	0	1
Sporting de Huelva	0	2	2
Levante	7	0	7
L'Estartit	0	3	3

Quarter-finals
Barcelona	1	2	3
Athletic Club	0	0	0
Espanyol	4	3	7
Prainsa Zaragoza	2	1	3
Torrejón	4	2	6
Sporting de Huelva	0	1	1
Rayo Vallecano	2	3	5
Levante	0	1	1

Semi-finals
Barcelona	0
Espanyol	1
Torrejón	0
Rayo Vallecano	3

Final
Espanyol	3
Rayo Vallecano	1
Third place
Barcelona	3
Torrejón	0

== Final ==
5 June 2010

Espanyol	3–1	Rayo Vallecano
Ane 7'; Mery 30'; Torrejón 64'	Report	Natalia 49'

Artunduaga, Basauri
Attendance: 1,200
Referee: Asier Isturiz Latorre

Espanyol	Rayo Vallecano

GK	1	(Spain) Mariajo		(substituted off) 94'
DF	16	(Mexico) Kenti Robles		(substituted off) 63'
DF	2	(Spain) Ane Bergara
DF	6	(Spain) Lara Rabal
DF	5	(Spain) Marta Torrejón
MF	20	(Spain) Sara Monforte
MF	15	(Spain) Silvia Meseguer
DF	4	(Spain) Míriam Diéguez
FW	18	(Italy) Pamela Conti	(yellow card) 43'	(substituted off) 90'
FW	21	(Spain) Vero Boquete	(yellow card) 72'	(substituted off) 92'
FW	19	(Spain) Mery
Substitutes:
DF	3	(Spain) Chola		(substituted on) 92'
FW	7	(Spain) Marta Corredera		(substituted on) 90'
GK	13	(Spain) Marina Marimón		(substituted on) 94'
MF	23	(Spain) Sara Mérida		(substituted on) 63'
Manager:
(Spain) Òscar Aja

GK	1	(Spain) Alicia Gómez	(red card) 83'
DF	4	(Spain) Meli Nicolau
DF	5	(Spain) Chabe		(substituted off) 66'
DF	15	(Spain) Burgos
DF	18	(Spain) Vanesa Gimbert
MF	22	(Spain) Sandra Vilanova	(yellow card) 77'
MF	20	(Spain) Keka		(substituted off) 29'
DF	16	(Spain) Ale López
MF	17	(Spain) Willy		(substituted off) 83'
FW	7	(Spain) Natalia Pablos	(yellow card) 74'
FW	9	(Spain) Adriana Martín
Substitutes:
FW	10	(Spain) Sonia Bermúdez		(substituted on) 29'
GK	13	(Spain) Estefi		(substituted on) 83'
FW	19	(Equatorial Guinea) Jade Boho		(substituted on) 66'
Manager:
(Spain) Pedro Martínez Losa
