= Jenni Hermoso =

Spanish footballer (born 1990)

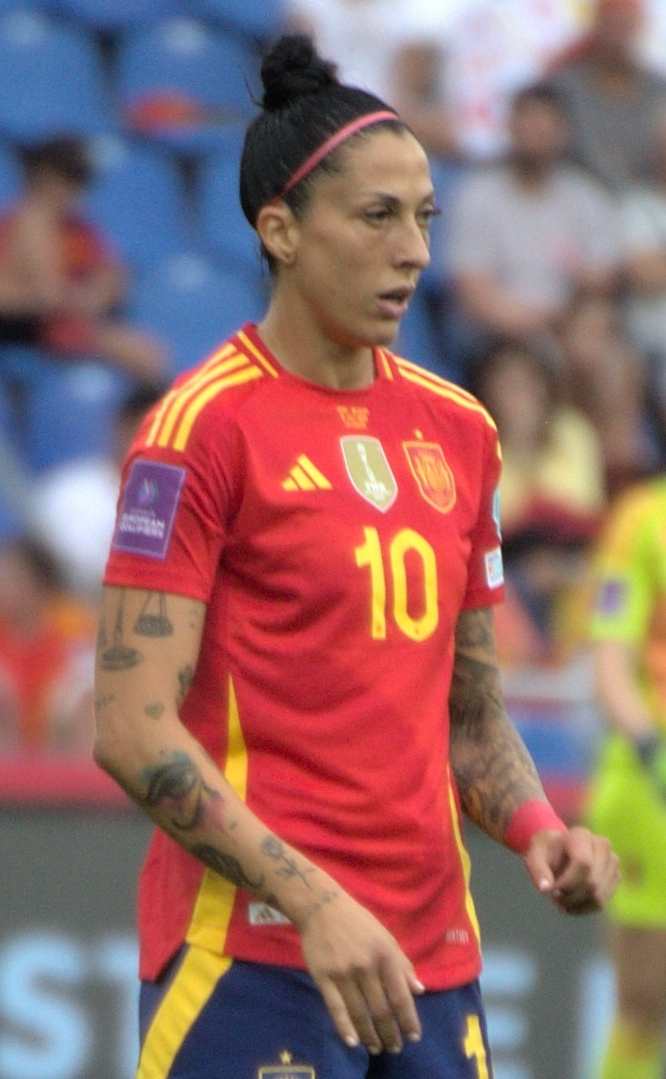
- Hermoso in 2024

Personal information
- Full name: Jennifer Hermoso Fuentes
- Date of birth: 9 May 1990 (age 36)
- Place of birth: Madrid, Spain
- Height: 1.75 m (5 ft 9 in)
- Position: Forward

Team information
- Current team: Atlético Madrid
- Number: 9

Youth career
- 2002–2005: Atlético Madrid

Senior career*
Years	Team	Apps	(Gls)
2004–2010	Atlético Madrid	89+	(19+)
2010–2013	Rayo Vallecano	72	(42)
2013	Tyresö FF	20	(6)
2014–2017	Barcelona	90	(77)
2017–2018	Paris Saint-Germain	19	(6)
2018–2019	Atlético Madrid	28	(24)
2019–2022	Barcelona	68	(71)
2022–2023	Pachuca	41	(26)
2024–2026	Tigres UANL	74	(30)
2026–	Atlético Madrid	0	(0)

International career^{‡}
2007	Spain U19		
2012–2025	Spain	125	(57)
Medal record
Women's football
Representing Spain
FIFA Women's World Cup
Winner	2023 Australia–New Zealand
UEFA Women's Nations League
Winner	2024 France–Netherlands–Spain
- * Club domestic league appearances and goals as of 13 January 2026 ‡ National team caps and goals as of 23:54, 02 December 2025 (UTC)

Jennifer Hermoso Fuentes (born 9 May 1990) is a Spanish professional footballer who plays as a forward for the Spanish club Atlético Madrid and the Spain national team. She is the all-time top scorer for Spain and holds the record for the most Pichichi trophies with five. She was part of her country's championship team at the 2023 FIFA Women's World Cup, where she won the Silver Ball.

Hermoso developed through the youth teams of her hometown club Atlético Madrid, where she stayed for eight years before joining Rayo Vallecano. She won her first senior title with Rayo in 2011, before signing with Tyresö FF of Sweden in 2013. She moved to FC Barcelona in 2014, where she changed her position from an attacking midfielder to a false 9. In her new position she became a prolific goalscorer, winning two Spanish league titles, two Copas de la Reina, and two Pichichi titles as the league's top scorer.

In 2015, Hermoso played for Spain during their first appearance at the FIFA Women's World Cup. She left Barcelona for Paris Saint-Germain in 2017, then returned to Atlético Madrid during the 2018–19 season, where she won her third Pichichi title and fourth league title.

Hermoso rejoined FC Barcelona in 2019 following Spain's exit from the 2019 Women's World Cup, where she was Spain's top scorer. In her final three seasons at Barcelona, she won three league titles, three Copas de la Reina, and the 2020–21 UEFA Women's Champions League, alongside the continental treble that same season. Individually, she finished both the 2019–20 and 2020–21 league seasons as the Primera División's top scorer; she finished 2020 and 2021 as the top scorer in Europe's top five women's leagues; and in 2021 she was the joint-top scorer in the UEFA Women's Champions League. At the end of 2021, she finished second in Ballon d'Or voting and was the world's highest female goalscorer of the calendar year with 51 goals.

In 2022, Hermoso signed for C.F. Pachuca of Mexico. The following year, she was a member of the Spain squad that won the 2023 Women's World Cup. During the medal ceremony, she was kissed by then-RFEF president Luis Rubiales, an event that would later be called the Rubiales case.

== Early life ==
Jennifer Hermoso Fuentes was born on 9 May 1990, in Carabanchel, a working-class neighbourhood in southern Madrid. She is the granddaughter of Antonio Hernández, a former goalkeeper for Atlético Madrid. As a child, he would take her to watch Atlético's matches at the Vicente Calderón Stadium. Hermoso grew up playing futsal and seven-a-side football, often with boys. Her football idols were Ana Belen Fernandez, Ronaldinho and Zinedine Zidane. She began playing for Atlético Madrid at age twelve with encouragement from her father and grandfather. Hermoso has a younger sister named Sofia.

== Club career ==
=== Atlético Madrid (2004–2010) ===
After developing with the youth teams of Atlético Madrid, Hermoso made her senior team debut in the Segunda División on 5 December 2004, at age 14. In her first match, she scored a goal in a 6–0 victory over Vicálvaro. During the 2005–06 season, she played 16 games and scored 12 goals, including a goal against UE L'Estartit that secured Atlético's promotion to the Superliga. After eight years of playing with the club, Hermoso left in 2010.

=== Rayo Vallecano (2010–2013) ===
Hermoso's signing to Rayo Vallecano was announced on 5 July 2010, alongside 7 other new signings. Rayo, which won the 2009–10 Superliga, were automatically qualified to the 2010–11 UEFA Women's Champions League Round of 32. Hermoso scored her first Champions League goals against Icelandic club Valur. Rayo reached the knockout stages, where they were eliminated by Arsenal. In the final of the 2010–11 Superliga, Rayo Vallecano played RCD Espanyol in a two-legged tie. In the first leg, Hermoso scored a penalty kick which gave Rayo the lead before Espanyol equalised the score. Hermoso went on to score the tie-winning goal in the return leg, winning her first ever league title and Rayo's third.

In qualification for the 2011–12 UEFA Women's Champions League, Hermoso scored two goals against Estonian club Pärnu. In the final match of qualifying, Hermoso scored her first Champions League hat-trick against Slovenian team ŽNK Krka. Rayo finished the qualification round with 3 wins from 3 matches to advance to the Round of 32 of the Champions League, where Hermoso scored her first Champions League knockout round goal against Valur. Rayo was eliminated in the Round of 16, again against Arsenal.

Hermoso left Rayo in 2013 during the Nueva Rumasa scandal that left Rayo's women's team without financial support.

=== Tyresö FF (2013) ===
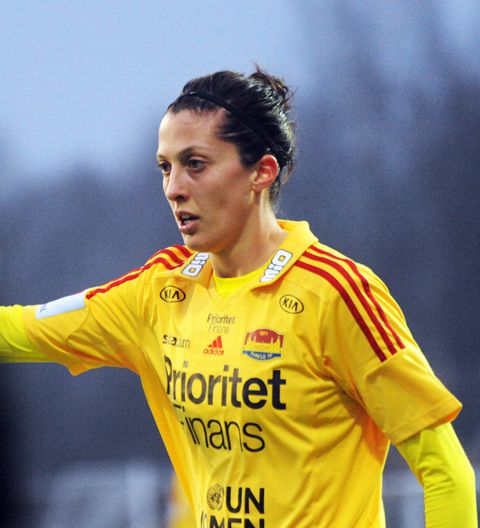
Hermoso with Tyresö FF in 2013

After leaving Rayo Vallecano, Hermoso signed with the Swedish club Tyresö FF for the 2013 season. The move to Sweden was Hermoso's first time playing football outside of Spain.

Hermoso debuted with Tyresö in the Champions League on 9 October against Paris Saint-Germain (PSG). She then played two other Champions League matches with the club, one against PSG and another against Fortuna Hjørring. Hermoso left the club in December after scoring 6 goals in 20 league matches. Tyresö would end up being runners-up in the Damallsvenskan and runners-up in the Champions League.

=== FC Barcelona (2014–2017) ===
==== 2013–14 season ====
At the end of the 2013 Damallsvenskan season, Hermoso contacted then-coach Xavi Llorens about playing for FC Barcelona Femení. In January 2014, she joined Barcelona on a 6-month contract. On 12 April 2014, Hermoso scored Barcelona's third and final goal in a match against Atlético Madrid, which clinched the club's third league title. On 21 June, Hermoso started the 2014 Copa de la Reina final against Athletic Club Femenino, which went to a penalty shootout after being tied 1–1 in extra time. Hermoso scored her penalty kick and won her first Copa de la Reina trophy.

==== 2014–15 season ====
Hermoso was cup-tied with Tyresö for the 2013–14 UEFA Women's Champions League season, and was unable to make her debut with Barcelona in the competition until the 2014–15 season. On 22 April 2015, Hermoso won her second Spanish league title with Barcelona and her third overall.

==== 2015–16 season ====
In her second full season at the club, Hermoso moved farther up the pitch to play as a false 9. In her new position, she began to develop into a prolific goalscorer. She scored her first Champions League goal for Barcelona against the Kazakh team BIIK Kazygurt. In the 2016 Copa de la Reina final against Atlético Madrid, Hermoso scored two goals as Barcelona was defeated 3–2. At the end of the league season, Hermoso earned her first Pichichi title after scoring 24 goals.

==== 2016–17 season ====
In February 2017, Hermoso was nominated to the 2016 FIFPro Women's World 11 for the first time. She was selected as 9th among the 15 players in the midfielder category. In March 2017, Hermoso scored a header against FC Rosengård in the quarter-finals of the 2016–17 UEFA Women's Champions League to help send Barcelona to their first ever Champions League semi-final. On 2 May, she scored 6 goals in a 13–0 win over the Basque club Oiartzun. Hermoso finished as the top league scorer for the second season in a row, with 35 goals in 27 matches.

In the 2017 Copa de la Reina final in June, Hermoso scored twice to win her second Copa de la Reina title with Barcelona. Hermoso scored a total of 77 goals in 90 games during her first 3-year stint at Barcelona.

=== Paris Saint-Germain (2017–2018) ===
On 3 July 2017, Hermoso signed a three-year contract with Paris Saint-Germain (PSG). At PSG, she played more as a midfielder than as a forward under coach Patrice Lair. She debuted with the team on 10 September in a 3–0 win over Rodez, and scored her first goal on 17 December. With PSG she played 19 of the 22 league games and scored 6 goals. She was the team's leader in assists, with seven. PSG finished second in Division 1 that season, securing a spot in the 2018–19 UEFA Women's Champions League, and also won the 2017–2018 Coupe de France. On 10 August 2018, PSG reported a mutual termination of contract with Hermoso; manager Olivier Echouafni said she was homesick for Spain.

=== Atlético Madrid (2018–2019) ===
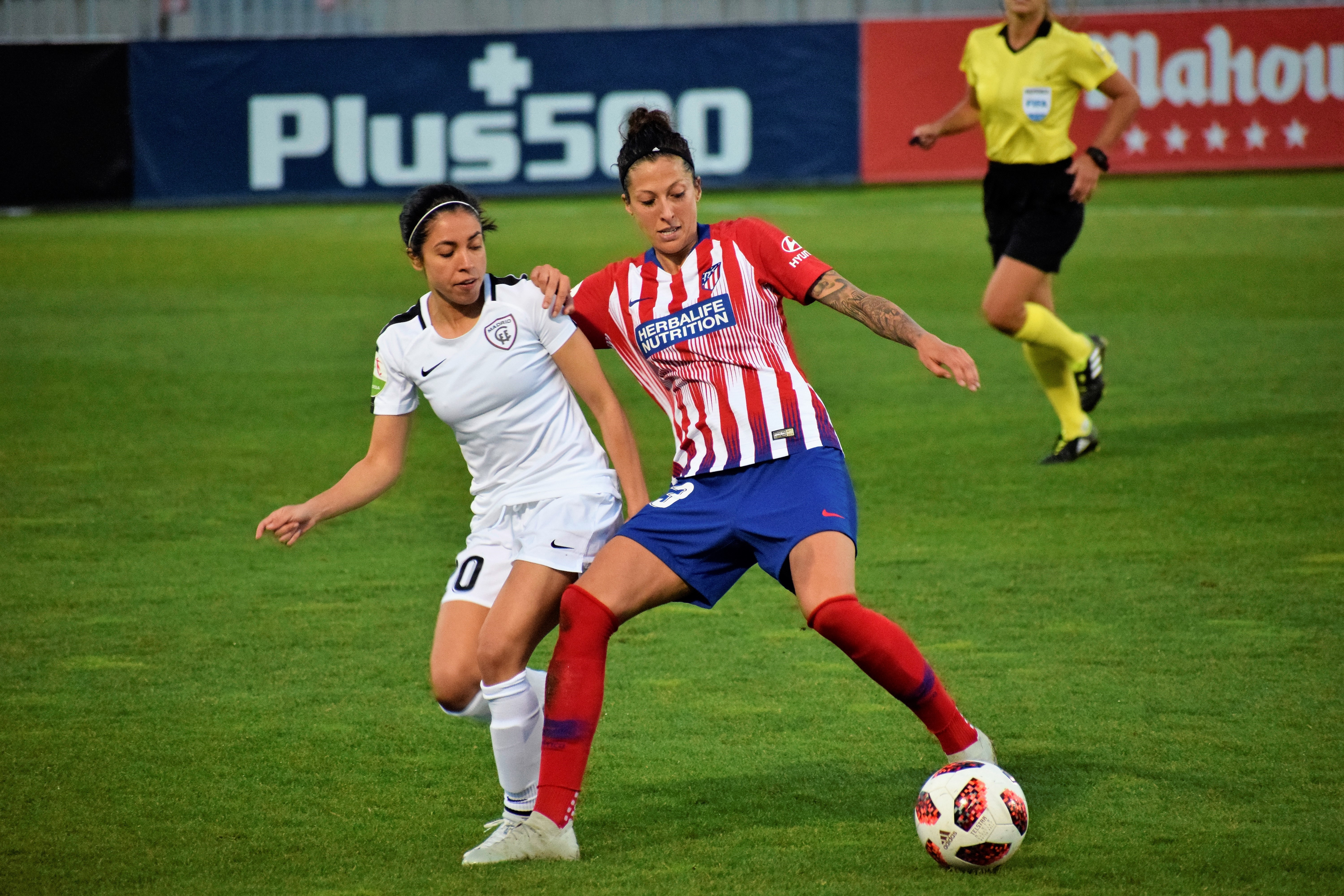
Hermoso with the ball in a match against Madrid CFF in 2018.

After playing one season at Paris Saint-Germain, Hermoso returned to Spain and re-joined Atlético Madrid on 10 August 2018. She was a key player in Atlético winning their third consecutive league title. At the end of the season, Hermoso had scored 24 goals to earn her first Pichichi title with the club and her third overall. Atlético was the runner-up in the 2018–19 Copa de la Reina. Hermoso was named the ninth-best playmaker of 2018 by the International Federation of Football History & Statistics (IFFHS) and the best Spanish player of 2018 by The Guardian. She was named to the league's Best XI of the season.

=== FC Barcelona (2019–2022) ===
==== 2019–20 season ====
Hermoso returned to FC Barcelona after two seasons away, signing a three-year contract in July 2019. In her first match back on 6 September, she scored a hat-trick within 18 minutes against CD Tacón (now known as Real Madrid Femenino). On 1 March 2020, Hermoso scored her 100th league goal with Barcelona with a hat-trick against Madrid CFF.

By May, the COVID-19 pandemic had resulted in the cancellation of the 2019–20 league season, and Barcelona was crowned the winner with 21 matchdays remaining. Hermoso finished as the league's top scorer with 23 goals, as well as the top scorer in Europe's top five leagues. When the 2019–20 UEFA Women's Champions League resumed in August, she competed in Barcelona's remaining matches as her club was eliminated in the semi-finals against VfL Wolfsburg. At the end of the campaign, Hermoso was named to the UEFA Women's Champions League Squad of the Season for the first time.

Due to the pandemic, the 2019–20 Copa de la Reina was postponed until it could be played during the 2020–21 season. Hermoso played the final of the 2019–20 Copa de la Reina on 13 February 2021, where she scored Barcelona's third and final goal against EdF Logroño. It was her third Copa de la Reina title with the club.

==== 2020–21 season ====
On 5 December 2020, Hermoso recorded four goals in one league match against Santa Teresa CD, scoring her 124th goal with Barcelona and surpassing Sonia Bermúdez as FC Barcelona Femeni's all-time top scorer. She then overtook Bermúdez's record number of 108 league goals scored with Barcelona. At the end of 2020, Hermoso was nominated for FIFA's The Best award, alongside teammate Caroline Graham Hansen. She was also one of eight FCB Femení players nominated for UEFA Women's Team of the Year.

Hermoso became the first Spanish player and the first player from the Spanish league to be recognized as the top scorer in the UEFA Women's Champions League; with six goals, she was tied with Fran Kirby. (Note: Attributed to multiple references:) She was also named to the UEFA Women's Champions League Squad of the Season for the second time. Later in the year, Hermoso won the UEFA Women's Champions League Forwards of the Season award.

During the 2020–21 season, Hermoso competed with Levante's Esther González to be the league's top scorer. (Note: Attributed to multiple references:) Their race for the Pichichi trophy continued until the final matchday of the league. Hermoso, who had 28 goals to González's 29, scored a hat-trick against Eibar to earn her third consecutive Pichichi title and fifth overall, surpassing Sonia Bermúdez for the most Pichichi titles. Hermoso ended her season with 31 league goals and finished as the top scorer in Europe's top five leagues for the second consecutive season. In August 2021, she was a finalist for the UEFA Women's Player of the Year Award alongside Barcelona teammates Alexia Putellas and Lieke Martens.

==== 2021–22 season ====
At the beginning of the 2021–22 season, Hermoso regained her number 10 shirt number upon the departure of Kheira Hamraoui. She played in her club's first ever Gamper Trophy match against Juventus; she scored two goals and was Player of the Match. In November, she finished second in Ballon d'Or voting behind teammate Alexia Putellas. Hermoso finished the 2021 calendar year with 51 goals in all competitions, the most of any female footballer in the world.

=== Pachuca (2022–2023) ===
After weeks of speculation about her future, Hermoso signed with Mexican club Pachuca of Liga MX Femenil on 21 June 2022. She scored 18 goals in the regular season of Clausura 2023, making her the second-highest scorer behind her teammate Charlyn Corral. Hermoso's three goals in the playoffs made her and Corral the joint top scorers with 21 goals over the full Clausura. Pachuca reached the league final but lost to Club América with a 4–2 aggregate score.

=== Tigres UANL (2024–2026) ===
On 1 January 2024, Hermoso signed with the Mexican club Tigres UANL. On 20 January, she scored her first two goals for the club in a 7–2 win against León. The Tigres lost the 2024 Liga MX Femenil Apertura championship final to Monterrey, then won the 2025 Apertura by defeating Club América in the final. Having lost finals with both Pachuca and Tigres in the past, Hermoso described this victory as a major achievement.

=== Atlético Madrid (2026–present) ===
In August 2026, Hermoso departed Tigres and signed a one-year contract with Atlético Madrid, beginning her third stint with the club. (Note: Attributed to multiple references:)

== International career ==
=== Youth national teams ===
Hermoso made her debut with Spain's U-19 national team on 12 April 2007 against Serbia in the second qualifying round of the 2007 U-19 European Championship, where she scored two goals. She played a total of four official matches with Spanish U-19 teams.

=== 2011–2013: Debut and Euro 2013 ===
In September 2011, Hermoso earned her first official call-up for the Spanish national team. She made her debut on 21 June 2012 against Turkey in a 4–0 victory that allowed Spain to play in the playoffs of the UEFA Women's Euro 2013. She scored her first national team goal in a friendly against Russia in January 2013.

In June 2013, national team coach Ignacio Quereda confirmed Hermoso as a member of his 23-player squad for the UEFA Women's Euro 2013 finals in Sweden. Hermoso scored her first competitive goal with Spain in their first match of the tournament, a 3–2 win over England. Hermoso was named Player of the Match. In the quarter-finals, she scored Spain's only goal in a 3–1 loss to Norway.

=== 2014–2015: Spain's first Women's World Cup ===
Hermoso played in all 10 qualifying matches for the 2015 FIFA Women's World Cup, scoring 7 goals while switching between center and attacking midfielder. Spain finished the qualifying phase with 9 wins and a draw, securing a spot in the Women's World Cup for the first time. Hermoso played in Spain's debut World Cup match, a 1–1 draw against Costa Rica. She did not play in the other two matches of the group stage, in which Spain was eliminated from the tournament. After the poor result at the World Cup, all 23 players in the Spanish squad issued a collective statement demanding the resignation of coach Ignacio Quereda, which eventually occurred on 30 July 2015.

=== 2016–2019: Algarve Cup, second Women's World Cup ===
Hermoso became a regular starter under Spain's new coach, Jorge Vilda, who changed her position to striker. In March 2017, she scored against Norway in the Algarve Cup, a friendly tournament in preparation for the 2017 European Championship. Spain advanced to the final and defeated Canada to win the tournament.

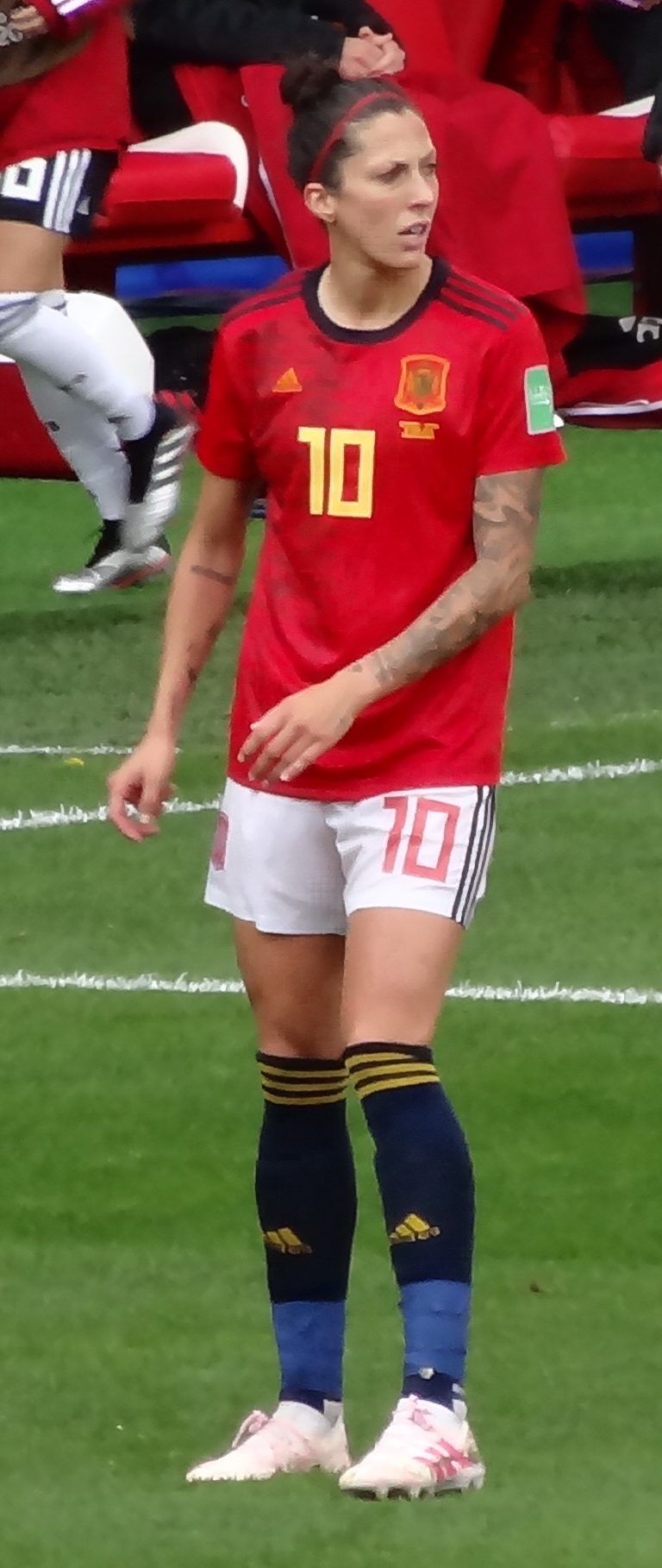
Hermoso during the 2019 Women's World Cup.

In qualifying for the 2019 FIFA Women's World Cup in France, Hermoso directly contributed to goals in each of Spain's matches, accumulating 7 goals and 9 assists. In the second match of qualifiers against Serbia, she made her 50th appearance for the national team. Spain completed the qualifying phase as group winners, winning all matches. During the qualifying phase, Hermoso played the 2018 Cyprus Women's Cup, which Spain won.

Hermoso was a member of Spain's squad at the 2019 Women's World Cup. She scored twice in their opening game against South Africa, with both goals coming from penalty kicks. She was named player of the match as Spain recorded their first ever match win in a World Cup. Spain was eliminated from the tournament after losing to the United States during the Round of 16, although Hermoso scored twice in the match.

=== 2020–2021: Becoming Spain's all-time top scorer ===
In a match against Azerbaijan on 14 February 2021, Hermoso scored 5 goals, surpassing Veronica Boquete to become Spain's all-time highest goalscorer with 41 goals. Hermoso ended the qualifying round of the 2022 Euro tournament with 10 goals, the most in Group D. In a controversial move, Vilda did not name Hermoso to the squad for Euro 2022 in July, citing an injury she sustained during the Champions League Final in May.

=== 2022: Las 15 ===
After Spain failed to make it past the quarter-finals at Euro 2022, many concerned players, including Hermoso, Irene Paredes and Patri Guijarro, discussed various issues with Vilda and RFEF president Luis Rubiales. Later, 15 players—not including Hermoso—felt they were not being heard, and asked the RFEF not to be called up to any upcoming camps. Hermoso voiced her support for these 15 players, as well as the wish to work together on improving the working conditions at the national team. As a result of her publicly supporting the 15 players, Hermoso was not called up by Vilda for upcoming matches.

=== 2023: World Cup victory and Rubiales case ===
Hermoso was part of the squad for the 2023 FIFA Women's World Cup in Australia and New Zealand. In Spain's second match against Zambia, Hermoso made her 100th international appearance and scored two goals, one of which was her 50th goal with the national team. Spain ultimately defeated England 1–0 in the World Cup final, winning the tournament for the first time. After playing 97% of total minutes and contributing 3 goals and 2 assists, Hermoso finished second in voting for the player of the tournament, behind teammate Aitana Bonmatí, and received the Silver Ball.

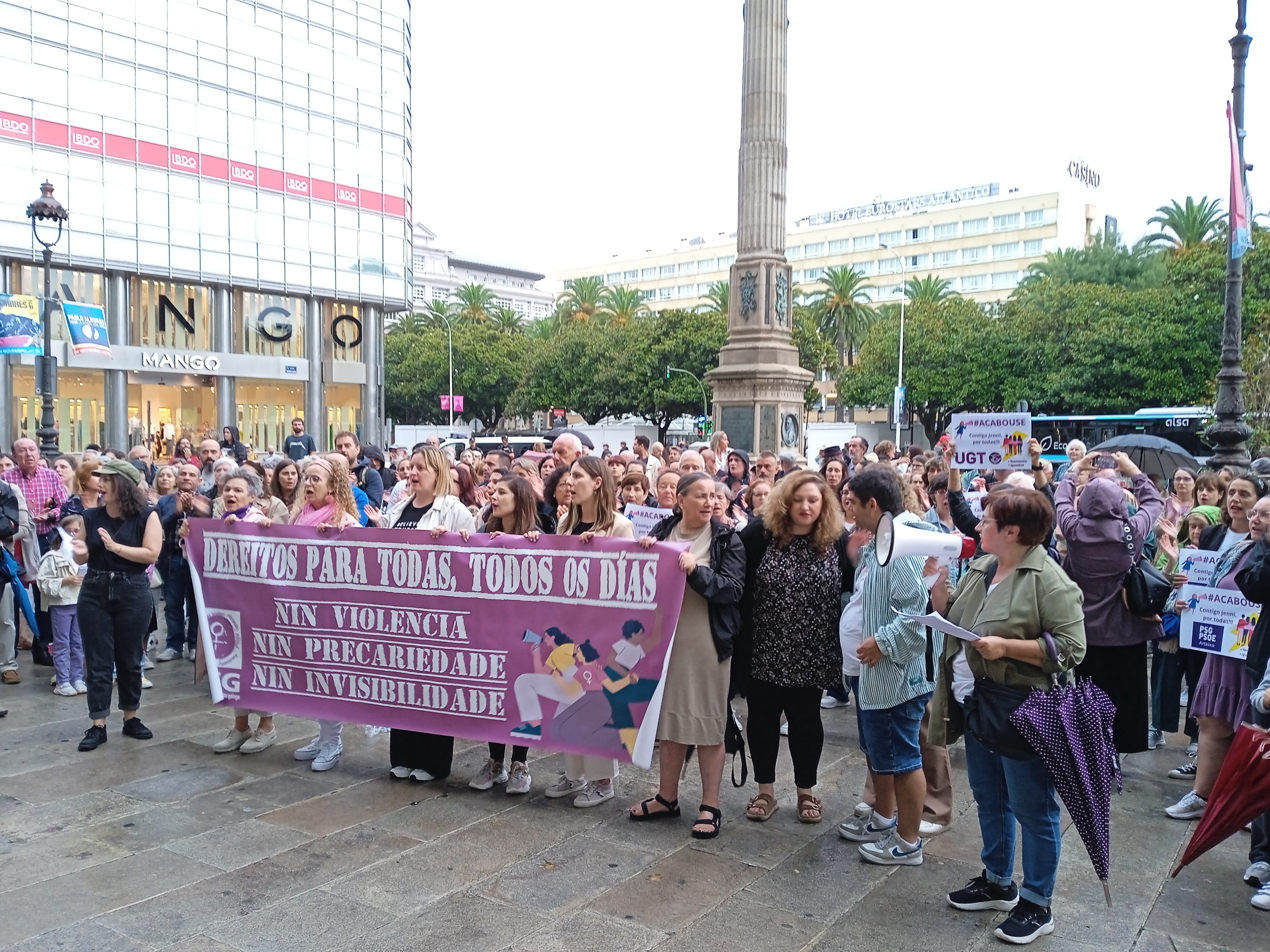
Demonstration in support of Jenni Hermoso, 28 August 2023

During the medal presentation after the final, Hermoso was kissed on the lips by Luis Rubiales, the president of the Royal Spanish Football Federation (RFEF). Rubiales subsequently apologised for the kiss, saying it was spontaneous and without "bad intentions". The kiss, which Hermoso said she "didn't like", drew condemnation from Spain's minister of equality Irene Montero and its prime minister Pedro Sánchez, who said Rubiales' apology was insufficient. On the return flight to Spain, Rubiales allegedly tried to convince Hermoso to appear in an apology video with him, which she declined.

On 23 August, three days after the World Cup final, Hermoso issued a joint statement with the Spanish football players' union, advocating for "measures to protect the players against actions we believe are unacceptable". The statement was endorsed by FIFPRO, the global players' union. In a subsequent statement, Hermoso denied Rubiales' claim that she consented to the kiss, and accused him of creating a "manipulative culture". In a show of solidarity, 53 Spanish players, including all 23 members of the 2023 Women's World Cup squad, signed a letter supporting Hermoso. They also pledged to refrain from playing for the national team until there were changes in RFEF leadership. The scandal led to statements of support for Hermoso from several active and former players, other athletes, and politicians, including Spain's deputy head of government Yolanda Díaz.

During a speech in front of the RFEF assembly on 25 August, Rubiales said he would not be intimidated by "false feminism," claimed that he was being "socially assassinated," and exclaimed five times in a row that he refused to resign. Following the speech, several players and training staff members temporarily resigned. Both FIFA and the Spanish National Sports Council launched investigations. Rubiales was provisionally suspended for 90 days and both he and the RFEF were banned from making contact with Hermoso. On 5 September, the women's national team coach Jorge Vilda—who allegedly pressured Hermoso to appear in Rubiales' apology video—was removed from all his positions within the RFEF. The RFEF then promised a "profound and immediate restructuring" of Spanish football. (Note: Attributed to multiple references:) Five days later, on 10 September, Rubiales formally resigned from his position as president of the federation.

On 6 September, Hermoso filed a criminal complaint accusing Rubiales of sexual assault. She gave her first testimony on 9 October before the Prosecution Ministry, which was filmed and broadcast by Spanish primetime television on Telecinco. It was reported that other members of RFEF had tried to coerce her to reduce pressure on Rubiales following the kiss. (Note: Attributed to multiple references:) The court case for sexual assault and coercion began on 3 February 2025. On 20 February, Rubiales was convicted of sexual assault but was acquitted of coercion. He was ordered to pay a fine of €10,800 (£8,942) and was ordered to stay at least 200 meters away from Hermoso and to not contact her for 12 months.

=== 2023–2024: UEFA Nations League ===
On 27 October 2023, Hermoso played her first international match since the World Cup during the Nations League, scoring the only goal in a 1–0 victory over Italy. A win over the Netherlands on 23 February 2024 secured Spain's spot at the Olympic Games in Paris. Spain went on to win the Nations League.

=== 2024–2025: Euro qualification, Nations League Finals ===
In 2024, Hermoso played in all six of Spain's qualifier games for the 2025 Euro in Switzerland. She was Spain's joint top scorer during the qualifiers alongside Salma Paralluelo, but she was left out of the 2025 Euro squad. In October 2025, after a year away from the national team, Hermoso was called up by Spain's newly appointed manager Sonia Bermúdez for the 2025 Nations League Finals.

== Style of play ==
At the start of Hermoso's career, she was positioned as either a center midfielder or attacking midfielder. In 2015, under the instruction of Xavi Llorens and Jorge Vilda, Hermoso played a more offensive role as a center-forward or false 9. This change allowed her to shift from giving assists and creating chances to becoming a prolific goalscorer. As a false 9 with Barcelona, Hermoso was at her most productive when she could play deeper and roam freely between opposing lines. She would regularly switch between her position in the center and either wing, both creating and finding space. Hermoso's free-roaming positional play was key to Barcelona's tactical setup, for it allowed her space to receive the ball and create chances. Aside from being Barcelona's top goalscorer, she was one of the biggest contributors to the team's attack during her two separate stints at the club. On the Spanish national team, she has played a slightly different tactical role that requires a more intense press and more positional discipline. Starting in 2022, she was pulled back from her position as the center-forward, moving to left or right midfield as needed.

Hermoso is known for her comparatively tall stature of 1.78 m (5 ft 10 in), which helps her score with headers. She excels when given the opportunity to play slower, possession-based football. She is left footed, but is capable of scoring with either foot, and is often keen on scoring goals from outside the box. Patrice Lair, the former manager of Paris Saint Germain, described Hermoso as "very technical and athletic".

== Personal life ==
During an interview in January 2024, Hermoso publicly came out as gay.

== Career statistics ==
=== Club ===
As of 22 May 2026

Club	Div.	Season	League			National Cups ^{(1)}			International Cup^{(2)}			Total		
Club	Div.	Season	Apps.	Goals	Assist.	Apps.	Goals	Assist.	Apps.	Goals	Assist.	Apps.	Goals	Assist.
Atlético de Madrid	2.ª	2004–05	1–15	1	0+							1–15	1	0+
Atlético de Madrid	2.ª	2005–06	16–25	12	2+							16–25	12	2+
	Total		17–40	13+	2+	—			—			17–40	13+	2+
Atlético de Madrid	1.ª	2006–07	22	5	0+	2	1	0+				24	6	0+
Atlético de Madrid	1.ª	2007–08	26	3	2+	3	0	0				29	3	2+
Atlético de Madrid	1.ª	2008–09	18	6	0+	2	0	0				20	6	0+
Atlético de Madrid	1.ª	2009–10	18–20	6	0+	2	0	0				20–22	6	0+
Atlético de Madrid	Total		89	20	2+	9	1	0+	—			98	21	2+
Rayo Vallecano	1.ª	2010–11	21	13	0+	1	0	0	4	1	0+	26	14	0+
Rayo Vallecano	1.ª	2011–12	27	14	0+	1	0	0	7	6	0+	35	20	0+
Rayo Vallecano	1.ª	2012–13	24	15	0+							24	15	0+
Rayo Vallecano	Total		72	42	0+	2	0	9	11	7	0+	83	49	0+
Tyresö F. F.	1.ª	2013	20	6	1	1	2	0	3	0	0	24	8	1
Tyresö F. F.	Total		20	6	1	1	2	0	3	0	0	24	8	1
F. C. Barcelona	1.ª	2013–14	13	9	0+	5	0	0				18	9	0+
F. C. Barcelona	1.ª	2014–15	21	9	0+	2	0	0	3	0	0	26	9	0+
F. C. Barcelona	1.ª	2015–16	29	24	0+	3	3	0	6	2	1	38	29	1+
F. C. Barcelona	1.ª	2016–17	27	35	7	5	7	0	8	5	2	40	47	9
F. C. Barcelona	Total		90	77	7+	15	10	0	17	7	3	122	94	10+
Paris Saint-Germain F. C.	1.ª	2017–18	19	6	8	5	2	0+				24	8	8
Paris Saint-Germain F. C.	Total		19	6	8	5	2	0+	—			24	8	8
Atlético de Madrid	1.ª	2018–19	28	24	7	3	0	0	4	0	0	35	24	7
Atlético de Madrid	Total		28	24	7	3	0	0	4	0	0	35	24	7
F. C. Barcelona	1.ª	2019–20	19	23	4	3	1	0	5	1	0	27	25	4
F. C. Barcelona	1.ª	2020–21	26	31	14	4	1	2	7	6	0	37	38	16
F. C. Barcelona	1.ª	2021–22	23	17	7	4	2	0	9	5	2	36	24	9
F. C. Barcelona	Total		68	71	25	11	4	2	21	12	2	100	87	29
C.F. Pachuca	1.ª	Apertura 2022	9	2	3							9	2	3
C.F. Pachuca	1.ª	Clausura 2023	23	21	3							23	21	3
C.F. Pachuca	1.ª	Apertura 2023	9	3	2							9	3	2
C.F. Pachuca	Total		41	26	8	—			—			41	26	8
Tigres UANL	1.ª	Clausura 2024	18	7	3	2	0	0				20	7	3
Tigres UANL	1.ª	Apertura 2024	16	3	0				4	1	1	20	4	1
Tigres UANL	1.ª	Clausura 2025	17	5	7				2	0	0	19	5	7
Tigres UANL	1.ª	Apertura 2025	23	15	2							23	15	2
Tigres UANL	1.ª	Clausura 2026	16	1								16	1	
Tigres UANL	Total		90	31	12	2	0	0	6	1	1	98	32	13
Career total (1.ª)			517	303	70	48	19	2	62	27	6	627	349	78
^{(1)} Includes Copa de la Reina (2005–2022) / Supercopa de España (2019–2022) / Svenska Cupen (2013) / Coupe de France (2017–18) / Campeón de Campeones (2024).^{(2)} Includes UEFA Women`s Champions League (2010–2022) / CONCACAF Champions Cup (2024).

=== International ===
As of matches played 29 October 2024

Selecciones	Year	European Championship ^{(3)}			World Cup ^{(3)}			Nations League			Olympic Games			Friendlies			Total		
Selecciones	Year	Apps.	G	A	Apps.	G	A	Apps.	G	A	Apps.	G	A	Apps.	G	A	Apps.	G	A
Under-19	2007	4	2	0													4	2	0
Under-19	Total	4	2	0	—			—			—			—			4	2	0
Absoluta	2012	4	0	0							not qualified						4	0	0
Absoluta	2013	4	2	0	4	1	0							3	1	0	11	4	0
Absoluta	2014				6	6	0							1	0	0	7	6	0
Absoluta	2015	3	1	0	1	0	0							3	1	0	7	2	0
Absoluta	2016	5	3	0							not qualified			3	0	0	8	3	0
Absoluta	2017	4	0	0	3	3	4							7	3	0	14	6	4
Absoluta	2018				5	4	5							5	0	0	10	4	5
Absoluta	2019	3	1	1	4	3	0							8	3	1	15	8	2
Absoluta	2020	2	4	2										3	0	2	5	4	4
Absoluta	2021	2	5	1	2	1	0				not qualified			2	0	0	6	6	1
Absoluta	2022				3	3	1							3	0	0	6	3	1
Absoluta	2023				7	3	2	4	1	0				5	2	2	16	6	4
Absoluta	2024	6	3	1				2	1	0	5	1	1	1	0	0	14	5	2
Absoluta	2025							2									2		
Total		33	19	5	35	24	12	8	2	0	5	1	1	43	11	5	125	57	23
Career Total		37	21	5	35	24	12	8	2	0	5	1	1	43	11	5	129	59	23
^{(3)} Includes qualification

== Achievements and honours ==
Rayo Vallecano

- Primera División: 2010–11

Barcelona

- Primera División: 2013–14, 2014–15, 2019–20, 2020–21, 2021–22
- UEFA Women's Champions League: 2020–21
- Copa de la Reina de Fútbol: 2014, 2017, 2020, 2021, 2022
- Supercopa Femenina: 2019–20, 2021–22

Atlético Madrid

- Primera División: 2018–19

Paris Saint-Germain

- Coupe de France Féminine: 2017–18

Tigres UANL

- Liga MX Femenil: Apertura 2025
- Campeón de Campeonas: 2024

Spain

- FIFA Women's World Cup: 2023
- UEFA Women's Nations League: 2023–24, 2025
- Algarve Cup: 2017
- Cyprus Cup: 2018

Individual

- FIFA Women's World Cup Silver Ball: 2023
- Primera División Top scorer: 2015–16, 2016–17, 2018–19, 2019–20, 2020–21
- UEFA Women's Champions League Squad of the Season: 2019–20, 2020–21
- UEFA Women's Champions League top scorer: 2020–21
- UEFA Champions League Forward of the Season: 2020–21
- UEFA Women's Player of the Season: 2020-21 (runner-up)
- Ballon d'Or 2021 (runner-up)
- The Best FIFA Women's Player: 2021 (3rd), 2023 (3rd)
- IFFHS Women's World Team of the Year: 2021, 2023
- IFFHS Women's UEFA Team: 2021, 2023
- The Offside Rule Podcast/The Guardian list of The 100 Best Female Footballers in the World: 2016 (86), 2017 (42), 2018 (49), 2019 (25), 2020 (14), 2021 (6), 2022 (50), 2023 (15), 2024 (67),
- The Guardian Footballer of the Year: 2023
- Financial Times' 25 most influential women of 2023
- Time 100: The 100 most influential people of 2024
- Sócrates Award: 2024
