= Verónica Boquete =

Spanish footballer (born 1987)

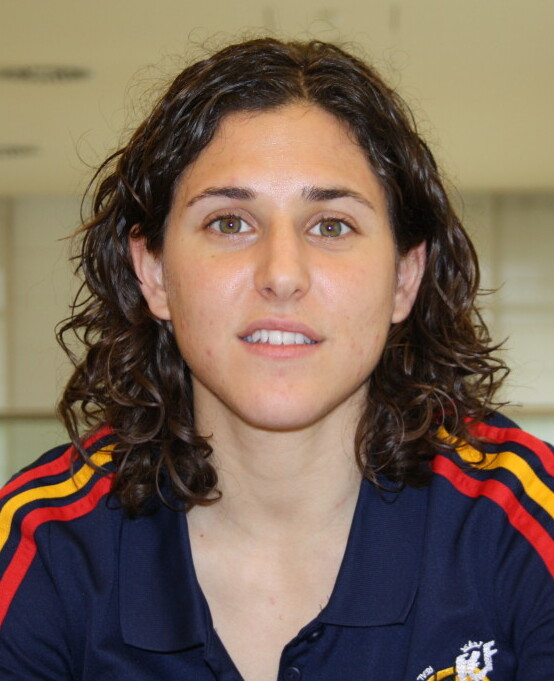
- Boquete with Spain in 2012

Personal information
- Full name: Verónica Boquete Giadáns
- Date of birth: 9 April 1987 (age 39)
- Place of birth: Santiago de Compostela, Galicia, Spain
- Height: 1.62 m (5 ft 4 in)
- Positions: Striker; attacking midfielder

Team information
- Current team: Como 1907
- Number: 87

Youth career
- 2004–2005: SD Xuventú Aguiño

Senior career*
Years	Team	Apps	(Gls)
2005–2008	Prainsa Zaragoza	83	(40)
2008–2010	RCD Espanyol	68	(39)
2010	Buffalo Flash	9	(9)
2010	Chicago Red Stars	3	(1)
2010–2011	RCD Espanyol	29	(41)
2011	Philadelphia Independence	13	(5)
2011	Energiya Voronezh	5	(1)
2012–2014	Tyresö FF	39	(13)
2014	Portland Thorns	15	(4)
2014–2015	1. FFC Frankfurt	21	(7)
2015–2016	Bayern Munich	9	(0)
2016–2018	Paris Saint-Germain	31	(8)
2018–2019	Beijing BG Phoenix		
2019–2020	Utah Royals FC	21	(0)
2020–2022	Milan	20	(2)
2022–2025	Fiorentina	82	(28)
2025–	Como 1907	0	(0)

International career
2004–2006	Spain U-19	23	(10)
2005–2017	Spain	62	(38)
2007–	Galicia	3	(2)
- * Club domestic league appearances and goals as of 14 July 2025

Verónica Boquete Giadáns (born 9 April 1987) is a Spanish professional footballer who plays as a forward or midfielder for Italian Serie B club Como 1907. Boquete has played professional club football for fifteen different clubs in eight different countries– her native Spain, the United States, Russia, Sweden, France, Germany, China, and most recently, Italy. She also formerly captained the Spain national team between 2013 and 2017, where she was a major part of their successful qualifications to the 2013 UEFA Women's Euro and the 2015 FIFA Women's World Cup. Boquete has additionally captained the Galicia national team for the team's entire history.

Boquete is widely regarded as one of the greatest Spanish footballers of all time and one of the best footballers of her generation. She stood out with RCD Espanyol in her early career, winning two Copas de la Reina with the club between 2008 and 2011, additionally earning a Pichichi Trophy for her 39 goals scored in the 2010–11 Superliga Femenina campaign, which remains a Spanish first division record. After departing Spain, Boquete's next long-term move came in 2012, where she joined Swedish side Tyresö FF. In 2014, she became the first Spanish player to appear in a UEFA Women's Champions League final, and later in the year became the first Spanish footballer to be nominated for the FIFA Women's World Player of the Year Award. Boquete finally reached Champions League success in 2015 and became the first Spanish player to win the UEFA Women's Champions League, which she accomplished with FFC Frankfurt. Since departing Frankfurt, Boquete has played for teams in France, China, the United States, and Italy, and has most recently spent four years in the latter country between AC Milan and Fiorentina.

She represented the Spanish national team for 12 years, debuting in February 2005 when she was 17 years old. As captain of the Spanish national team between 2013 and 2017, Boquete played a crucial role in qualifying them to the 2013 Euros, Spain's first Women's Euro appearance since 1997, as well as their first ever Women's World Cup appearance in 2015. Following their group stage elimination from the 2015 FIFA Women's World Cup, Boquete famously led the players of the Spain national team in protest against the continued employment of Ignacio Quereda, who they alleged was verbally and physically abusive. Following Quereda's resignation and Jorge Vilda's subsequent hiring, her role in the team gradually lessened until she was controversially omitted from Spain's 2017 UEFA Women's Euro squad. Her national team career effectively ended in 2017, and she retired with 62 appearances and then-team record 38 goals scored.

Boquete has long been outspoken against the unfair and unequal treatment of female footballers, especially within her home country of Spain. In 2013, Boquete petitioned Electronic Arts to include women in their popular game series FIFA, which was eventually successful with women being implemented into the game for the first time in FIFA 16. Prior to the 2015 Women's World Cup in Canada, Boquete joined other prominent female footballers in filing a lawsuit against FIFA for gender discrimination for the use of artificial turf in Canada's World Cup venues. In 2023, she was vocal in her support of Jenni Hermoso, who was forcibly kissed on the lips by RFEF President Luis Rubiales in trophy celebrations at the 2023 Women's World Cup final, an event that was later dubbed the Rubiales affair.

== Early life ==
Verónica Boquete Giadáns was born on 9 April 1987 in Santiago de Compostela to Nicasio Boquete and Mercedes Giadans. Boquete was inspired to play football by her father, who was a coach in Spain's Third Division, and her brother Adrián, who also played football. She recounts that when she was a child, she was the only girl in her city that played with boys. For a year, she was only allowed to train with the all-boys team, as there was a rule that girls were not allowed to play matches for boy's teams. After her father and the club's president helped take her case to the CSD to change the rule, she played in teams of boys until she was fifteen years old. Boquete credits her outspoken nature to the discrimination she dealt with as a young female footballer.

In addition to her time playing football, she also played futsal in teams of other girls. In 2004, at the age of 15, Boquete joined the girl's section of S.D. Xuventú Aguiño, a futsal team based in her home region of Galicia. Scouting by national team coaches at Aguiño led to her first call-up for Spain's U-19 national team. After winning the 2004 U-19 Women's Euro, Boquete received offers from many Spanish clubs but decided to finish her Bachillerato before making her first big career move.

== Club career ==
=== Prainsa Zaragoza ===
Boquete left Galicia at 18 to pursue a career in football, first playing for Prainsa Zaragoza in 2005. She chose Zaragoza despite offers from more successful clubs, such as Levante, Rayo Vallecano, and Espanyol, because she knew she would have had a more prominent role there.

In May 2008, Zaragoza released her from the club before the end of the season and would no longer include her in their squads. In the three years she spent in Zaragoza, Boquete averaged a goal every two matches.

=== RCD Espanyol ===
Boquete moved to RCD Espanyol in August 2008 following her departure from Prainsa Zaragoza. She made her debut on 11 September 2008 in the Copa Catalunya against Barcelona, which Espanyol won 2-0. On 21 June 2009, Boquete played the first major final of her career, the Copa de la Reina final, against her former club Prainsa Zaragoza. Espanyol won by a resounding 5-1 scoreline, and Boquete won the first major title of her career. In the 2008-09 Superliga campaign, Boquete scored a personal best 15 goals. For her accomplishments with Espanyol, Boquete was chosen as Galicia's Athlete of the Year in 2009.

In the 2009–10 Superliga Femenina, the league title continued to evade Espanyol, who reached the final again but lost 1-0 to Rayo Vallecano. On 5 June 2010, Boquete competed in her second consecutive Copa de la Reina final, this time against Rayo Vallecano. Boquete had a much more prominent role in this final compared to last year's, assisting Mery's second goal in a 3-1 victory for Los Periquitos.

==== 2010: Summer in Buffalo and Chicago ====
In 2010, Boquete moved to the USA for the summer to play for the Buffalo Flash of the USL W-League, a semi-professional and developmental league. She only featured for the Flash for a month, but still made an impact by scoring eight goals in nine matches. On 31 July 2010, Boquete scored a brace in the 2010 USL W-League Championship helping lead the Flash to victory over the Vancouver Whitecaps. She was named MVP of the tournament and her performances captured the attention of the Chicago Red Stars of the WPS.

Boquete was preparing to leave the country when she got a call from the Chicago Red Stars asking her to play for them for the remainder of the 2010 WPS season. She joined the Red Stars on 8 August 2010, but had some immigration issues before coming to the team that caused her to miss three matches. When she arrived at the very end of the season, she helped Chicago win their final two matches of the season, recording a goal and two assists across both games. Boquete recounted later in her playing career that in Chicago, she was finally able to see a future where she could become a professional footballer.

==== 2010–2011: Return to Espanyol ====
Boquete returned to Spain following the conclusion of the 2010 WPS season, only missing two matches at the beginning of the 2010–11 Superliga Femenina. In her year back with Espanyol, she was unable to repeat her past accomplishments in the Copa de la Reina, but found great success individually.

After finishing atop Group A of the second round of the Superliga, Espanyol qualified for the final once more against Rayo Vallecano. In the first leg, Boquete scored both of her team's goals in a 2-2 away draw. In the second leg, Espanyol lost to Rayo 1-2 at home. She ended her season as the top scorer of the league, and her 39 goals in 26 matches remains the single-season goalscoring record in the Spanish women's first division. Espanyol reached the 2011 Copa de la Reina final, but Boquete was not present as she had already joined the WPS's Philadelphia Independence in the United States. They lost in extra time to Barcelona.

=== Philadelphia Independence ===
Boquete came to wider international prominence after signing for Philadelphia Independence of the American Women's Professional Soccer (WPS) in 2011. The club made the transfer official on 21 January, but she played out the rest of her league season with Espanyol before coming to the club on 4 June. She was a key player in Independence's 2011 season having scored 5 goals (4 of which were match-winning goals) and assisting another 4. Philadelphia reached the final of the playoffs against the Western New York Flash, which advanced to penalties after being tied in extra time. Boquete took and converted her penalty, but the team ended up losing 4-5 at the end of the shootout. At the end of the season, she was awarded the Player of the Year Award after making just 11 league appearances. In addition, she had been awarded the Player of the Week award three times.

=== Energiya Voronezh ===
On 12 September 2011, Boquete was confirmed to be moving to Russian side Energiya Voronezh. It was reported that she would be earning €80,000 a year at the club. With Energiya, she made her debut in the UEFA Women's Champions League on 29 September against Bristol Academy. She scored her first Champions League goal in the second leg of the Round of 32 tie against Bristol. Energiya were knocked out by fellow Russian side Rossiyanka in the following round. Boquete did not stay at the club for long, departing for Tyresö in January. The team folded due to financial struggles the following year.

=== Tyresö FF ===
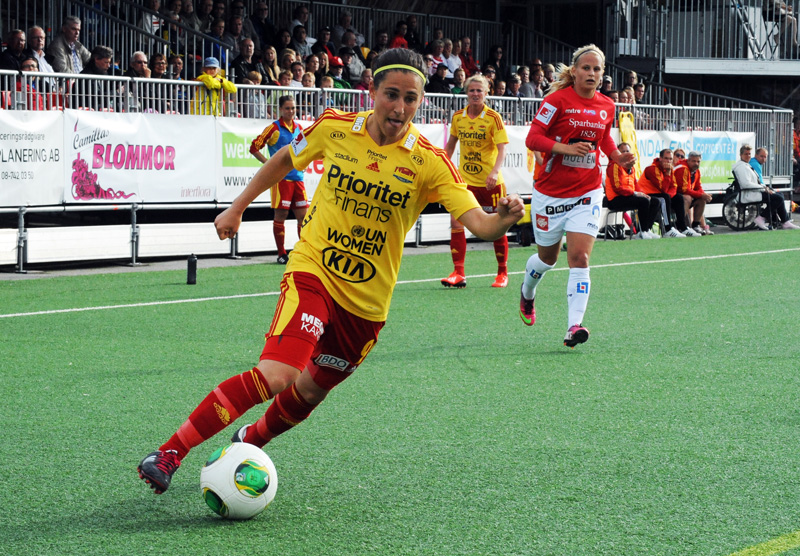
Playing for Tyresö FF in 2014

In January 2012 Boquete announced a transfer to Swedish Damallsvenskan club Tyresö FF on a two-year contract. At Tyresö, she found herself to be part of a "superteam" alongside other women's football greats such as Marta, her childhood role model, Caroline Seger, Ali Krieger, Jennifer Hermoso, Lisa Dahlkvist, Caroline Graham Hansen, and Christen Press, amongst others.

Tyresö won the Damallsvenskan title for the first time in the 2012 season. Boquete was named the Damallsvenskan's Midfielder of the Year for 2012, and finished her season with 8 assists, the third-most in the league. In August 2013, Boquete was nominated for the UEFA Women's Player of the Year Award for the first time. She ended up finishing fifth in the voting. Boquete once again concluded that year's Damallsvenskan season as the third-highest assister, this time reaching 9 assists. She was also included in the league's Best XI of the season.

Amongst rumors that the club was facing financial troubles, Boquete announced that she would be leaving the club once their season ended. The club reached the 2014 UEFA Women's Champions League Final, which was played against Wolfsburg on 22 May. In the months leading up to the final, Boquete suffered two major injuries – an overload of her calf muscle and a ligament tear in her quadriceps of her right leg. She managed to recover in time to start the final, and two minutes after Marta scored Tyresö's first goal, Boquete poked in their second following a cross from Marta. Tyresö went into halftime victorious, but conceded twice quickly into the second half. They ended up losing the match 3–4, which was Boquete's final match for the club. Tyresö declared bankruptcy and folded very soon after their Champions League Final loss, an expected development following a long period of financial problems.

=== Portland Thorns ===
On 7 April 2014, Portland Thorns FC acquired Boquete (along with midfielder Sarah Huffman) from the Western New York Flash in exchange for Courtney Wetzel, Kathryn Williamson, and Portland's first-round pick in the 2015 NWSL College Draft. Western New York originally held her NWSL rights. She joined the Thorns following Tyresö's participation in the 2013-14 UEFA Women's Champions League tournament, making her first appearance for the Thorns on 7 June 2014 versus the Western New York Flash. She scored her first goal for the Thorns on 15 June 2014 versus the Washington Spirit. She went on to score four goals and record six assists in her 15 total appearances for the Thorns, culminating with the team's semi-final loss against FC Kansas City on 23 August 2014. Her six assists set a single-season record for the Thorns, which was broken by Tobin Heath two seasons later. During her time in Portland, she won the league's Player of the Week award three times. She was also nominated for a second consecutive UEFA Women's Player of the Year Award in July, where she again finished fifth in the voting. At the end of the 2014 NWSL season, she placed second in the voting for the NWSL MVP Award, she was named to the league's Best XI, and was voted to be Portland's Player of the Year by the club's fans.

=== FFC Frankfurt ===
On 25 August 2014, following the conclusion of the Portland Thorns' season, Boquete signed with 1. FFC Frankfurt, the 2014 runners-up in the Frauen-Bundesliga. While she was with Frankfurt, she was nominated for the first time to the 2014 FIFA Women's World Player of the Year Award, the predecessor to the Ballon D'or Féminin. With this nomination, she became the first Spanish woman to be nominated to the Ballon d'Or. She finished in 8th place out of 10 nominees with 6 percent of the voting.

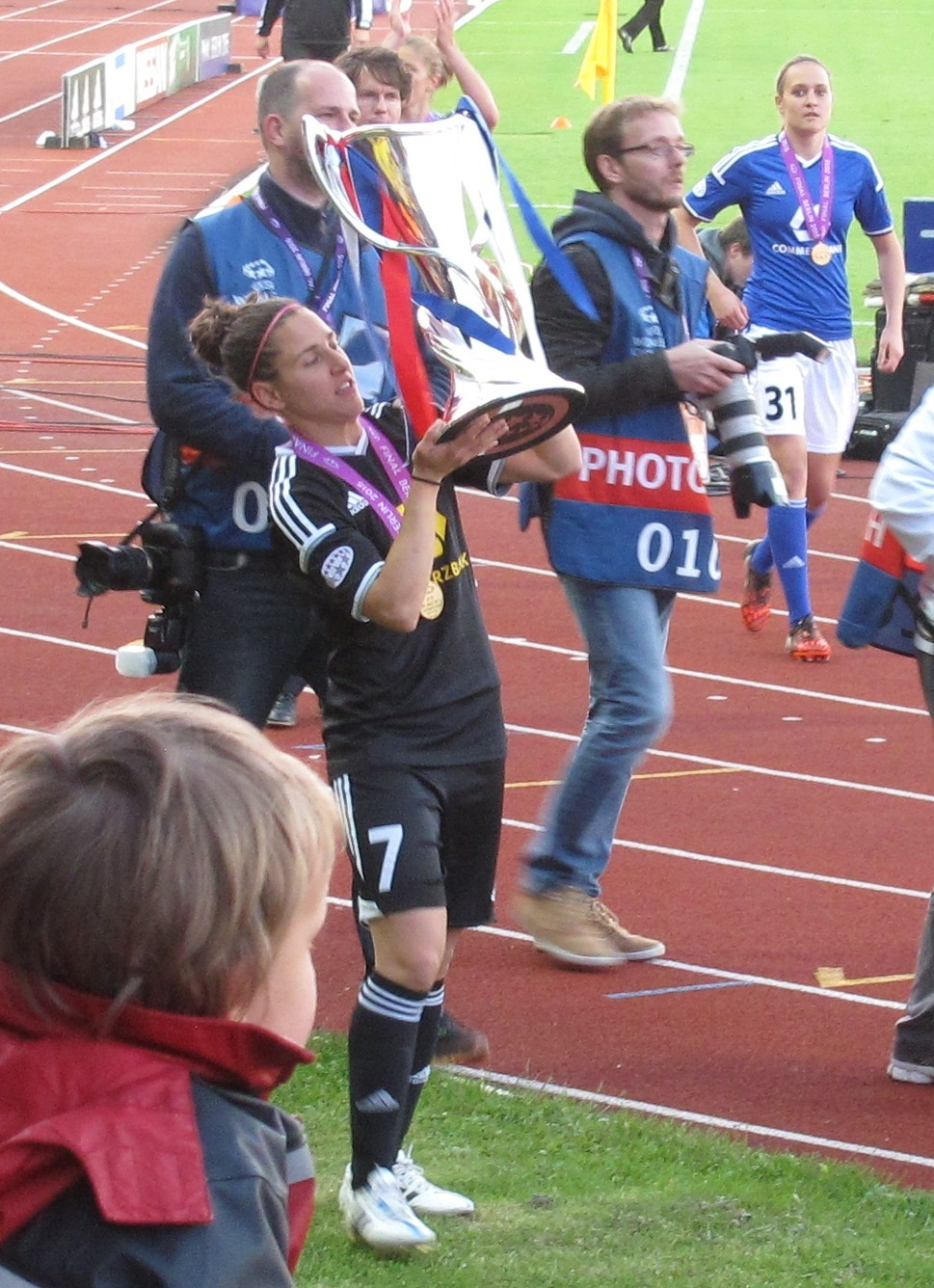
With the UEFA Women's Champions League trophy in 2015

Boquete reached her second consecutive UWCL final with Frankfurt. She started the final on 14 May 2015, despite continuous discomfort in her ankle and quadriceps. Frankfurt ended up winning 2-1 against PSG, and with this win, Boquete became the first Spanish player in history to win a UEFA Women's Champions League title. She was named to the UWCL Squad of the Season for 2014-15, and finished her campaign with 6 goals and 4 assists.

=== Bayern Munich ===
On 27 May 2015, Boquete signed for the reigning Bundesliga champions, Bayern Munich, on a two-year contract. Shortly after signing, Boquete picked up a hamstring injury during pre-season that kept her out of play for five months. She still picked up her third consecutive nomination to the UEFA Women's Player of the Year Award and finished 4th in the final voting, a place higher than the previous two years. She made her official comeback on 20 November 2015, playing 20 minutes in a Frauen-Bundesliga match against Leverkusen. After returning from injury, Boquete found herself struggling to adapt to Bayern's playing style. The club defended their Bundesliga title victory, but fell to FC Twente in the Round of 32 of the 2015-16 UEFA Women's Champions League knockout stage. Boquete left the club at the end of the season, uncharacteristically making just 9 appearances and scoring no goals.

=== Paris Saint-Germain ===
After a personally unsuccessful season with Bayern, she was signed by French club Paris Saint-Germain on a two-year contract. Boquete arrived with motivations of helping PSG win their first UEFA Women's Champions League title. At PSG, Boquete spent a lot of her time coming off the bench.

In her first season at PSG, the club reached the 2017 UEFA Women's Champions League final, the third of her career. Boquete subbed on for PSG in the 57th minute and played through both periods of extra time to reach a penalty shootout. Boquete converted her penalty, but PSG ended up losing the match in dramatic fashion after an unsuccessful penalty attempt from PSG's goalkeeper Katarzyna Kiedrzynek and a successful penalty conversion from Lyon's goalkeeper Sarah Bouhaddi.

By early 2018, Boquete became dissatisfied with her reduced playing time and agreed a mutual termination of her contract with Paris Saint-Germain.

=== Beijing BG Phoenix ===
Following her stints in Bayern and PSG where she struggled to find her place in either team, Boquete accepted an offer from Beijing BG Phoenix, her first footballing experience outside of Europe or the United States. She signed a one-season deal with the Chinese club and was given her customary number 21 jersey. The club finished 6th place out of 8 in the 2018 Chinese Women's Super League.

=== Utah Royals ===
On 4 January 2019, Boquete announced her signing to the Utah Royals FC of the National Women's Soccer League. She was named to the NWSL Team of the Month for May 2019. At the end of the 2019 NWSL season, she had the third-most assists in the league with 6.

Amidst internal issues and controversy within the Real Salt Lake organization, Boquete confirmed in November 2020 that she would not be returning to Utah for the 2021 NWSL season, and that she would go back to playing football in Europe. She ended her stint with the Royals having scored one goal and recording eight assists.

=== AC Milan ===
Boquete joined Italian side AC Milan on 9 November 2020. In her first season, she made 19 total appearances for the club across all competitions, and was an important factor in the team's eventual Champions League qualification. At the end of 2020, Boquete was named to the 2020 FIFPRO Women's World 11. She accepted the award, but reflected on social media that she did not believe she deserved a place in the XI.

In the second leg of the 2020–21 Coppa Italia semifinal, Boquete scored a brace to help Milan triumph 4-2 (5-4 aggregate) over their historic rivals Inter. Prior to the Coppa Italia final, the club agreed to extend her contract for a year, which was announced on 20 May 2021. She competed in the 2021 Coppa Italia final on 30 May 2021, which eventually went to penalties after a 0-0 extra time result. Boquete took and missed her team's first penalty, and Milan fell to Roma 1-3 on penalties.

In the following season, she had a less prominent role, and only made 6 league appearances. Boquete confirmed her early departure from the club on 1 January 2022. Prior to her departure announcement, she was not part of Milan's squad for any of their seven most recent matches, fueling reports of conflict with head coach Maurizio Ganz.

=== Fiorentina ===
On 6 January 2022, Boquete joined Fiorentina on a deal until the end of the season.

=== Como 1907 ===
On 14 July 2025, Boquete was signed on a free transfer by Como 1907, who had just registered in Serie B.

== International career ==
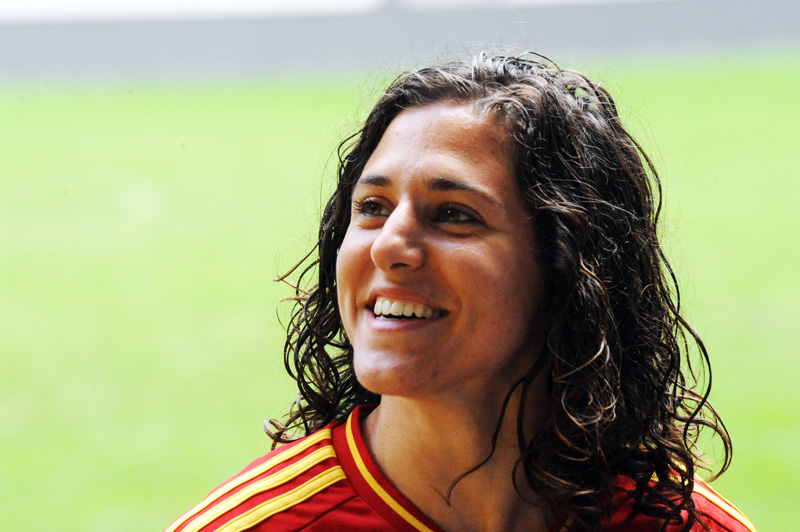
Boquete with Spain in 2013

=== 2004–2006: Youth national team career ===
Boquete's first international experience with Spain came with their U-19 team, which she played with in 2004. She later went on to win the 2004 UEFA Women's Under-19 Championship with Spain and compete in the 2004 FIFA U-19 Women's World Cup.

=== 2005–2012: National team debut ===
Boquete's senior Spain women's national football team debut came in February 2005, in a 0–0 friendly draw with the Netherlands.

=== 2012–2014: Euro and World Cup qualifications ===
Spain reached qualification playoffs for the 2013 UEFA Women's Euro following a second place finish in qualification group B. Boquete was injured for the first leg of the playoff against Scotland, which Spain drew 1-1. She was able to compete in the second leg on 24 October 2012. The match eventually progressed to extra time, and both teams were still drawing by minute 113, but Scotland had away goal advantage and were minutes away from qualifying. Spain were then given a penalty deep into extra time, which Boquete took and missed. Just three minutes later, Boquete redeemed herself by scoring the winning extra time goal from a volley in the 122nd minute, effectively qualifying Spain for their first UEFA Women's Euro since 1997. Boquete later reflected on this goal as the most important one of her career.

In June 2013, national team coach Ignacio Quereda confirmed Boquete as a member of his 23-player squad for the UEFA Women's Euro 2013 finals in Sweden.

=== 2015–2016: World Cup and Quereda dispute ===
On 11 May 2015, Quereda announced his squad list for the 2015 FIFA Women's World Cup, with Boquete being named captain. Prior to the tournament, the RFEF and Spain's coaching staff had greatly mishandled the team's arrival to Canada. They arrived only two days in advance after being forced to take multiple layovers on their flight to the country. Additionally, they were poorly physically prepared and did not participate in any friendly matches in the six months leading up to the tournament, all events that established a great sense of tension in Spain's squad.

Spain had a difficult tournament, drawing their first match against Costa Rica and losing the next one against Brazil. In the final group game against South Korea at Lansdowne Stadium in Ottawa, both teams were playing for a place in the last 16; Boquete opened the scoring although Spain was unable to hold the lead and lost 2–1. After the match, Quereda was filmed screaming in the face of Vicky Losada, who was in tears on the team bench. Boquete also claims that the players were verbally accosted by RFEF officials following their elimination from the tournament, saying that [the officials] "sacrificed time with their families so [the players] could 'have some fun.'"

The events that transpired after the South Korea match caused tensions to overflow within the Spain national team camp, leading to a player revolt against Quereda, who had been coach of the national team for 27 years. On 19 June, each of the 23 players in their 2015 World Cup squad published an open letter asking for Quereda to be dismissed as national team coach. It was the second time that players of the Spain national team wrote a letter to ask for Quereda's dismissal, with the first incident happening in 1997. This time, Boquete was the unwritten leader of the player revolt, and gave multiple interviews and press conferences to defend the actions of the players. Once the team returned to Spain, Boquete spoke to the media in the Madrid–Barajas airport and told them that the players were a united front, and that they demand that the RFEF create a "serious project." Over the coming days, the players in the squad spoke to media individually to expand and elaborate on their grievances. Overall, the players accused Quereda of mishandling his role as coach both on and off the pitch. They complained that they used outdated training methods from the beginning of Quereda's tenure, that they were unprepared for the tournament after arriving late and not playing any matches for months, and that they didn't receive any analysis or background on their World Cup opponents. Further, the players alleged that Quereda was highly controlling, had a history of blacklisting players he didn't like, made comments on players weights, and that he would frequently say rude and misogynistic things.

Quereda eventually resigned on 29 July after a weeks-long standoff with the players. The RFEF thanked him for his 27 years of service for the national team, praising him for "creating a solid structure" and achieving "outstanding results." In his place, the Federation appointed Jorge Vilda, who had coached and found success with multiple Spanish women's youth national team sections. In the midst of this change, Boquete was awarded with the Bronze Medal of the Royal Order of Sporting Merit, a Spanish civil order of merit for distinguished service in sports, on 29 July.

=== 2016–present: 2017 Euro exclusion and aftermath ===
Under Vilda's leadership, Boquete was gradually phased out of the team over the next two years alongside Spain's other veteran players. However, she did feature in some of Spain's later qualification matches for the 2017 UEFA Women's Euro. La Roja officially clinched Euro qualification on 12 April 2016 against the Republic of Ireland, where Boquete scored 2 in a 3-1 win. By June 2017, she had only featured in 6 of Spain's nineteen matches since the 2015 World Cup. On 20 June 2017, she was surprisingly and controversially omitted from Spain's squad for that year's UEFA Women's Euro. Shortly after, she posted a letter to the public on social media expressing her sadness for not being called up, and wishing good luck to her teammates at the competition.

When reflecting on being dropped from the Spanish squad for the Euros, she often laments that neither Vilda nor any staff member from the national team communicated their decision to her. Following the Euros, Boquete was never chosen to play for Spain again and was effectively blacklisted from national team duty. In a 2018 interview, Boquete told These Football Times that her omission from the squad was "not a surprise," that she "could see it happening," and had been "preparing for it for months." In a 2020 interview with The Daily Telegraph, Boquete said "I know my time with the national team is over, and I know it's not because of my football." Boquete's national team career ended with an accumulation of 62 caps and 38 goals, the latter being a team record that stood for four years until Jenni Hermoso overtook her in February 2021. Since leaving the national team, she has given commentary on many Spain women's national team matches, including during the 2023 FIFA Women's World Cup.

Throughout the years following her omission from Spain's 2017 Euro squad, Boquete would continue to speak publicly about her difficult experiences in the national team. On 28 October 2021, she was featured in a Movistar+ documentary called Romper El Silencio ("Break the Silence"), where she detailed her experiences while playing in the Spanish national team under Quereda. Boquete, alongside former teammates Vicky Losada, Natalia Pablos, and Mar Prieto, said in the documentary that Quereda was psychologically abusive, vocally homophobic, controlling, and that he created a toxic playing environment in the national team for decades. In 2022, during the Las 15 conflict, Boquete would continue to offer her support to the 15 players demanding better conditions within the national team.

Following Jorge Vilda's dismissal as Spain's head coach in the aftermath of the Rubiales affair, Boquete posted a photo of herself on X smiling and holding a bottle of champagne with the caption "Vintage Champagne, 8 years of maturation in the bottle," a nod to Vilda's eight years in charge of Spain.

==== Response to Luis Rubiales kissing Jenni Hermoso ====
After the Spain national team won the 2023 FIFA Women's World Cup, then-president of the Royal Spanish Football Federation (RFEF), Luis Rubiales, kissed Spain forward Jennifer Hermoso on the lips without her consent during Spain's trophy presentation. The incident prompted fierce international backlash and criticism, with Rubiales eventually being removed from his position as president and resigning in the following months. Largely due to her role in removing Ignacio Quereda as Spain coach in 2015, Boquete became a central figure in criticism of Rubiales, national team coach Jorge Vilda, Vilda's staff, and the RFEF as a whole.

On 25 August, Boquete brought together 80 other current and former Spanish international footballers into a WhatsApp group chat which she titled "Off to War," where they organized to write and sign a letter stating that they would not return to the national team unless Luis Rubiales was removed from his position within the RFEF. Days later, Boquete wrote an article about the demeaning treatment of women footballers in Spain, hoping that the international outcry following the incident would bring structural reform to Spanish football, rather than merely replacing Rubiales with someone similar. She further attributed Rubiales's behavior to a wider, cultural issue within the RFEF that requires systematic change.

Later on, in a September interview with German publication Der Spiegel, Boquete alleged that the RFEF hacked Hermoso's phone to find compromising images and videos that would help discredit her to the public. In addition, she criticized the Spain men's national team's "delayed" and "weak" statement about the incident, and further criticized the RFEF for appointing Montsé Tomé to replace Jorge Vilda. She argued that that "[Tomé] tolerated too many things [from Rubiales]" and that there were more qualified coaches with more experience that should have replaced Vilda. She further argued that Tomé's appointment was an attempt from the RFEF to put a woman in charge to "keep the players from complaining."

=== International goals ===
#	Date	Venue	Opponent	Score	Result	Competition
1	8 May 2008	La Ciudad del Fútbol, Las Rozas de Madrid	Czech Republic	2–1	4–1	UEFA Women's Euro 2009 qualifying
2	8 May 2008	La Ciudad del Fútbol, Las Rozas de Madrid	Czech Republic	4–1	4–1	UEFA Women's Euro 2009 qualifying
3	28 May 2008	The Showgrounds, Newry, Northern Ireland	Northern Ireland	0–3	0–3	UEFA Women's Euro 2009 qualifying
4	2 October 2008	Estadio Ruta de la Plata, Zamora	England	1–0	2–2	UEFA Women's Euro 2009 qualifying
5	19 September 2009	Centenary Stadium, Ta' Qali, Malta	Malta	0–10	0–13	2011 FIFA Women's World Cup qualification
6	19 September 2009	Centenary Stadium, Ta' Qali, Malta	Malta	0–12	0–13	2011 FIFA Women's World Cup qualification
7	21 November 2009	Manisa 19 Mayıs Stadium, Manisa, Turkey	Turkey	0–5	0–5	2011 FIFA Women's World Cup qualification
8	24 June 2010	Estadio La Albuera, Segovia	Malta	9–0	9–0	2011 FIFA Women's World Cup qualification
9	17 September 2011	Recep Tayyip Erdoğan Stadium, Istanbul, Turkey	Turkey	1–3	1–10	UEFA Women's Euro 2013 qualifying
10	17 September 2011	Recep Tayyip Erdoğan Stadium, Istanbul, Turkey	Turkey	1–5	1–10	UEFA Women's Euro 2013 qualifying
11	17 September 2011	Recep Tayyip Erdoğan Stadium, Istanbul, Turkey	Turkey	1–8	1–10	UEFA Women's Euro 2013 qualifying
12	23 October 2011	La Ciudad del Fútbol, Las Rozas de Madrid	Switzerland	3–2	3–2	UEFA Women's Euro 2013 qualifying
13	20 November 2011	Stadionul Buftea, Buftea, Romania	Romania	0–2	0–4	UEFA Women's Euro 2013 qualifying
14	20 November 2011	Stadionul Buftea, Buftea, Romania	Romania	0–3	0–4	UEFA Women's Euro 2013 qualifying
15	24 November 2011	Estadio Escribano Castilla, Motril	Germany	1–2	2–2	UEFA Women's Euro 2013 qualifying
16	5 April 2012	La Ciudad del Fútbol, Las Rozas de Madrid	Kazakhstan	1–0	13–0	UEFA Women's Euro 2013 qualifying
17	5 April 2012	La Ciudad del Fútbol, Las Rozas de Madrid	Kazakhstan	11–0	13–0	UEFA Women's Euro 2013 qualifying
18	16 June 2012	Stadion Brügglifeld, Aarau, Switzerland	Switzerland	2–3	4–3	UEFA Women's Euro 2013 qualifying
19	24 October 2012	La Ciudad del Fútbol, Las Rozas de Madrid	Scotland	3–2	3–2	UEFA Women's Euro 2013 Play-off
20	16 June 2013	Pinatar Arena, San Pedro del Pinatar	Russia	1–0	2–1	Friendly
21	28 June 2013	Vejle, Denmark	Germany	0–1	2–2	Friendly
22	28 June 2013	Vejle, Denmark	Germany	2–2	2–2	Friendly
23	12 July 2013	Arena Linköping, Linköping, Sweden	England	0–1	2–3	UEFA Women's Euro 2013
24	18 July 2013	Nya Parken, Norrköping, Sweden	Russia	0–1	1–1	UEFA Women's Euro 2013
25	14 January 2014	La Manga Stadium, La Manga Club	Norway	1–0	1–2	Friendly
26	13 February 2014	Estadio Las Gaunas, Logroño	North Macedonia	1–0	12–0	2015 FIFA Women's World Cup qualification
27	13 February 2014	Estadio Las Gaunas, Logroño	North Macedonia	8–0	12–0	2015 FIFA Women's World Cup qualification
28	17 September 2014	Spartak Písek, Písek, Czech Republic	Czech Republic	0–1	0–1	2015 FIFA Women's World Cup qualification
29	3 March 2015	Estadio Municipal, La Roda	New Zealand	1–0	2–2	Friendly
30	22 July 2015	Lansdowne Park, Ottawa, Canada	South Korea	0–1	2–1	2015 FIFA Women's World Cup
31	24 January 2016	Stadion pod Malim Brdom, Petrovac na moru, Montenegro	Montenegro	0–2	0–7	UEFA Women's Euro 2017 qualifying
32	8 April 2016	Complexo Desportivo da Covilhã, Covilhã, Portugal	Portugal	1–4	1–4	UEFA Women's Euro 2017 qualifying
33	12 April 2016	La Ciudad del Fútbol, Las Rozas de Madrid	Republic of Ireland	1–0	3–0	UEFA Women's Euro 2017 qualifying
34	12 April 2016	La Ciudad del Fútbol, Las Rozas de Madrid	Republic of Ireland	2–0	3–0	UEFA Women's Euro 2017 qualifying
35	15 September 2016	La Ciudad del Fútbol, Las Rozas de Madrid	Montenegro	1–0	13–0	UEFA Women's Euro 2017 qualifying
36	15 September 2016	La Ciudad del Fútbol, Las Rozas de Madrid	Montenegro	2–0	13–0	UEFA Women's Euro 2017 qualifying
37	15 September 2016	La Ciudad del Fútbol, Las Rozas de Madrid	Montenegro	8–0	13–0	UEFA Women's Euro 2017 qualifying
38	15 September 2016	La Ciudad del Fútbol, Las Rozas de Madrid	Montenegro	9–0	13–0	UEFA Women's Euro 2017 qualifying
Correct as of 15 September 2016

== In popular culture ==
In June 2013 Boquete became the first Spanish female footballer whose biography has been published. Titled Vero Boquete, la princesa del deporte rey (Vero Boquete, the princess of the king's sport), it was written by Marca writer David Menayo.

=== Successful FIFA video game women's petition ===
In 2013, Boquete started a petition on Change.org, which called upon video game producer Electronic Arts to introduce female players in its FIFA series and attracted 20,000 signatures in 24 hours. The petition was eventually successful, as EA Sports revealed in May 2015 that she and the rest of Spain would join 11 other female international teams (Australia, Brazil, Canada, China, England, France, Germany, Italy, Mexico, Sweden and the United States) in FIFA 16, which was released in September 2015 (on the 22nd in North America and the 24th in Europe) for the PlayStation 3, PlayStation 4, Xbox 360, Xbox One and also on Windows PC.

=== Estadio Verónica Boquete ===
On 8 November 2018, the city hall of Santiago de Compostela agreed to rename their main stadium to Estadio Verónica Boquete de San Lázaro, in recognition of Boquete.

== Personal life ==
Boquete speaks Galician, Spanish, Portuguese, English, and Italian. While at Prainsa Zaragoza, Boquete completed her studies in the Teaching of Physical Education at the University of Zaragoza in 2009.

She owns a Boxer dog named Lía.

Her signature celebration is putting her outspread palm over her face, which mimics the shape of an octopus. It is a gesture of connection to her friends and family of Galicia, where octopus is a culinary staple. Additionally, Boquete prefers to wear the number 21 on her jersey in honor of Espanyol's Dani Jarque, who died of a heart attack in 2009 while she was at the club.

Since October 2017, Boquete has been a member of Common Goal, an organization of footballers who pledge to donate at least 1% of their yearly salary to football charities. Specifically, she supports a charity based in Saint Lucia, which aims to help women achieve social and economic advancement through sport.

=== Lawsuit against FIFA ===
In 2014, Boquete, alongside other prominent players at the 2015 Women's World Cup, filed a gender discrimination lawsuit with the Ontario Human Rights Tribunal against FIFA for choosing host stadiums for the World Cup with pitches made of artificial turf. Artificial turf is known to be more dangerous to players, as it is more likely lead to more frequent injuries with longer recovery periods compared to grass pitches, and the rubber pellets in the turf itself can cause burns (often called turf burn) which can lead to skin infections.

The lawsuit gained support from prominent athletes like the NBA's Kobe Bryant and USMNT goalkeeper Tim Howard. Despite support from fans and fellow athletes, the lawsuit failed and the tournament went ahead as planned on artificial turf pitches.

== Honours ==
RCD Espanyol

- Copa de la Reina de Fútbol: 2009, 2010

Buffalo Flash

- USL W-League Championship: 2010

Tyresö FF

- Damallsvenskan: 2012

1. FFC Frankfurt

- UEFA Women's Champions League: 2014–15

Bayern München

- Bundesliga: 2015–16

Spain

- UEFA Women's Under-19 Championship: 2004
- Algarve Cup: 2017

Individual

- Bronze Medal of the Royal Order of Sporting Merit: 2015
- FIFA FIFPro Women's World11: 2020
- WPS Michelle Akers Player of the Year: 2011
- Primera División Golden Boot: 2010–11
- UEFA Women's Championship Team of the Tournament: 2013
- NWSL Best XI: 2014
- Damallsvenskan Best XI: 2013
- USL W-League MVP: 2010
- Damallsvenskan Midfielder of the Season: 2012
- WPS Best XI: 2011
