= Saray García =

Spanish footballer (born 1984)

Personal information
- Full name: Saray García García
- Date of birth: 5 September 1984 (age 42)
- Place of birth: Madrid, Spain
- Height: 1.68 m (5 ft 6 in)
- Position: Midfielder

Senior career*
Years	Team	Apps	(Gls)
1997–2010	Torrejón	54+	(25+)
2010–2016	Rayo Vallecano	73+	(14+)
2016–2018	Madrid CFF	26+	(5+)
2018–2019	Logroño	22	(0)
2019–2020	Rayo Vallecano	0	(0)

International career
2005–2008	Spain	14	(0)
- * Club domestic league appearances and goals

Saray García García (born 5 September 1984) is a Spanish footballer who plays as a midfielder. She was previously a founding member of AD Torrejón CF.

She was a member of the Spain women's national team during the 2007 World Cup and the 2009 European Championship's qualifying stages.

== Honours ==
=== Club ===
Rayo Vallecano

- Primera División (1): 2010-2011

Madrid CFF

- Segunda División (1): 2016-2017
