= SD Reocín (women) =

Spanish football team

Reocín
- Full name: Sociedad Deportiva Reocín
- Founded: 2001
- Ground: Municipal Pepín Cadelo, Reocín; Cantabria, Spain
- Capacity: 1,000
- Chairman: Anto Verdugo
- Manager: Pedro Munitis
- League: Segunda División
- 2012–13: Segunda División, Group 5, 9th
Home colours

Sociedad Deportiva Reocín Femenino, formerly known as EMD Reocín and Reocín Racing, is the women's team of SD Reocín.

== History ==
Reocín also represented Racing Santander while it played in the Spanish premier league between 2010 and 2012, wearing its kit and badge while remaining an independent club. For several years it was the only women's football team in Cantabria.

Despite financial strains (SD Reocín retired from Tercera División in December 2010) Reocín-Racing was 3rd in the second stage's Group B (an overall 13th position) in its first season in Primera División, qualifying for the 2011 Copa de la Reina, where they were knocked by eventual champion FC Barcelona. The team's economic situation was critical at the beginning of the 2011–12 season, but improved subsequently. However, the team was relegated as it ended last in the table with two wins and three draws in 38 matches.

In its return to Segunda División, with former international Pedro Munitis as coach, Reocín ended the 2012-13 season in Group 5's lower half of the table. In 2015, the team was relegated again and since 2016 does not play any competition.

== Current squad ==
As of 1 May 2013 (reference)
Note: Flags indicate national team as defined under FIFA eligibility rules; some limited exceptions apply. Players may hold more than one non-FIFA nationality.

| No. | Pos. | Nation | Player |
|---|---|---|---|
| — | GK | (Spain) ESP | Rosa García |
| — | DF | (Spain) ESP | Andrea Alonso |
| — | DF | (Spain) ESP | Irene de la Fuente |
| — | DF | (Spain) ESP | Rebeca Herrera |
| — | DF | (Spain) ESP | Arantxa Lazcano |
| — | MF | (Spain) ESP | Carla Castillo |
| — | MF | (Spain) ESP | Paula Hoya |
| — | MF | (Spain) ESP | Sandra Laso |
| — | MF | (Spain) ESP | Lucía Martínez |
| — | MF | (Spain) ESP | Silvia Martínez |

| No. | Pos. | Nation | Player |
|---|---|---|---|
| — | MF | (Spain) ESP | Yumay Muñoz |
| — | MF | (Spain) ESP | Andrielly Nascimento |
| — | FW | (Spain) ESP | Soraya Cobo |
| — | FW | (Spain) ESP | Elisa del Estal |
| — | FW | (Spain) ESP | Sara del Estal |
| — | FW | (Spain) ESP | Ángela Labrador |
| — | FW | (Spain) ESP | Paula Lavin |
| — | FW | (Spain) ESP | Sonia Ortiz |
| — | FW | (Spain) ESP | Claudia Salas |

== Season to season ==
| Season | Division | Place | Copa de la Reina |
|---|---|---|---|
| 2001–02 | 2ª | | |
| 2002–03 | 2ª | 5th | |
| 2003–04 | 2ª | 11th | |
| 2004–05 | 2ª | 4th | |
| 2005–06 | 2ª | 3rd | |
| 2006–07 | 2ª | 1st | |
| 2007–08 | 2ª | 6th | |
| 2008–09 | 2ª | 2nd | |
| 2009–10 | 2ª | 1st | |
| 2010–11 | 1ª | 14th | First round |
| 2011–12 | 1ª | 18th | |
| 2012–13 | 2ª | 9th | |
| 2013–14 | 2ª | 4th | |
| 2014–15 | 2ª | 12th | |

== See also ==
- Category:SD Reocín (women) players
