= Alexandra López =

Spanish footballer (born 1989)

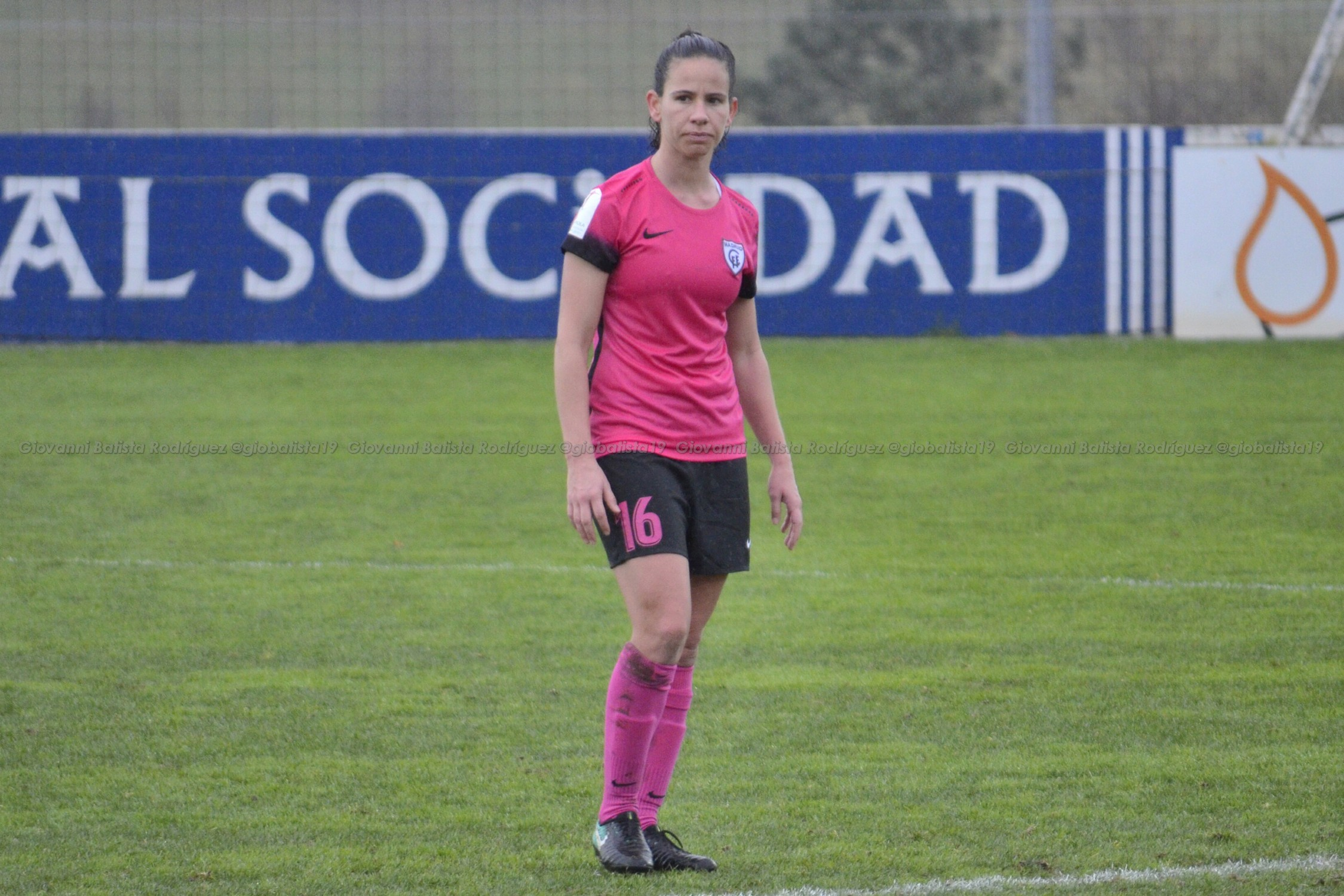

Personal information
- Full name: Alexandra López Rosillo
- Date of birth: 26 February 1989 (age 37)
- Place of birth: Seville, Andalusia, Spain
- Height: 1.62 m (5 ft 4 in)
- Positions: Defender; defensive midfielder

Team information
- Current team: Madrid CFF
- Number: 16

Senior career*
Years	Team	Apps	(Gls)
2003–2008	Sevilla		
2008–2016	Rayo Vallecano		
2016–2017	Atlético Madrid	24	(2)
2017–	Madrid CFF	51	(5)

International career
- Spain U19
2008–	Spain	14	(0)
- * Club domestic league appearances and goals as of 11 April 2019

Alexandra López Rosillo (born 26 February 1989), commonly known as Ale, is a Spanish football defender who plays for Madrid CFF in Spain's Primera División. She previously played for Sevilla FC.

She is a member of the Spain women's national football team. After falling out of favour under Ignacio Quereda, Ale was recalled by incoming national team coach Jorge Vilda in 2015.

== Honours ==
Rayo Vallecano

- Primera División: Winner 2008–09, 2009–10, 2010–11

Spain

- Algarve Cup: Winner 2017
