= Cristina Vega =

Spanish footballer (born 1981)

Keka Vega
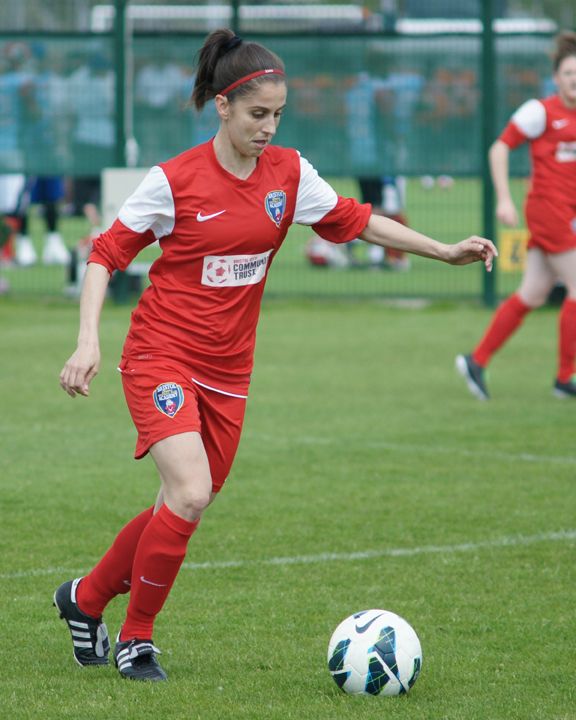
- Keka in 2014

Personal information
- Full name: Cristina Vega Leandro
- Date of birth: 3 April 1981 (age 45)
- Place of birth: Tres Cantos, Spain
- Position: Midfielder

Team information
- Current team: Keynsham Town LFC
- Number: 21

Senior career*
Years	Team	Apps	(Gls)
- Tres Cantos
2001–2004	Estudiantes Huelva		
2004–2005	Torrejón		
2005–2006	Estudiantes Huelva		
2006–2013	Rayo Vallecano		
2013–2014	Bristol Academy		
2015–	Keynsham Town		

International career
2010	Spain	1	(0)
- * Club domestic league appearances and goals

Cristina Vega Leandro (born 3 April 1981), also known as Keka, is a Spanish footballer who plays as a midfielder in England's WPL for Keynsham Town. She previously played in the Spanish First Division for Estudiantes Huelva, AD Torrejón and Rayo Vallecano, winning three championships and one national cup and playing the UEFA Champions League with the latter.

She has been a member of the Spain national team.

Keka joined Bristol Academy on 1 August 2013, where she joined compatriots Laura del Río and Natalia Pablos. At Bristol the trio were nicknamed "The Three Amigas".

In January 2015, Keka moved to Keynsham Town to play in the FA Women's Premier League alongside former fellow Rayo Vallecano midfielder, Pilar García. She is currently amongst their leading scorers with six goals from five games.
