= Natalia Pablos =

Spanish international footballer

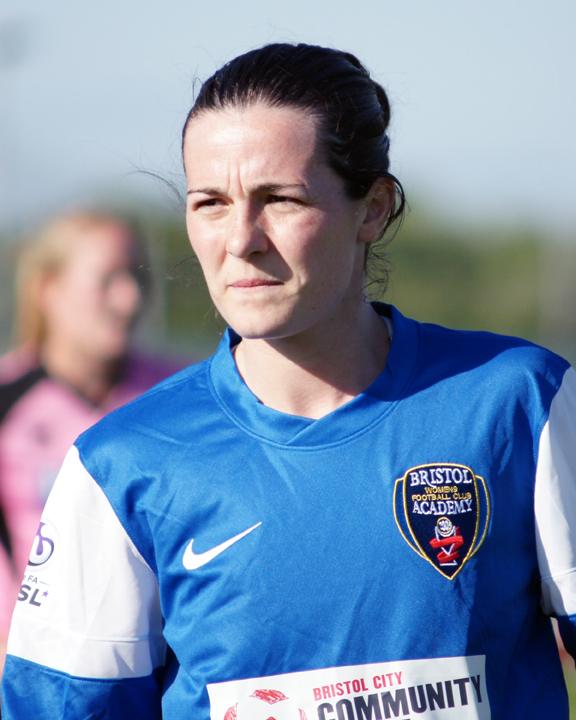
- Natalia with Bristol Academy in 2013

Personal information
- Full name: Natalia Teresa Pablos Sanchón
- Date of birth: 15 October 1985 (age 41)
- Place of birth: Madrid, Community of Madrid, Spain
- Height: 1.66 m (5 ft 5 1/2 in)
- Position: Striker

Senior career*
Years	Team	Apps	(Gls)
2000–2013	Rayo Vallecano		
2013–2014	Bristol Academy	27	(12)
2015–2016	Arsenal	24	(11)
2016–2018	Rayo Vallecano	50	(36)

International career
	Spain U-19	16	(6)
2005–2015	Spain	22	(13)
- * Club domestic league appearances and goals

Natalia Teresa Pablos Sanchón (born 15 October 1985), known simply as Natalia, is a Spanish former footballer who played as a forward. She spent most of her club career at Rayo Vallecano and was a member of the Spain women's national team.

== Club career ==
Until 2013 she was the captain of Rayo Vallecano women's team, where she played since the club's foundation in 2000. At Rayo, Natalia won three Leagues and one Spanish Cup. She was the league's top scorer of the 2007-08 and 2008-09 seasons with 24 and 29 goals respectively. In November 2012, she scored her 300th goal for Rayo, including almost 200 league goals. A few months later (March 2013) she was leaving the club having scored 311 goals in 324 matches overall.

In 2013, she joined compatriot Laura del Río at Bristol Academy in the English FA WSL. Bristol manager Mark Sampson called Natalia a female version of Swansea City's Spanish striker Michu.

In October 2014 Birmingham City's Karen Carney was fined, banned for one match and sent on an education course for an incident in July with Pablos.

In December 2014 Natalia announced that she had left Bristol Academy to join Arsenal Ladies. She was an unused substitute as Arsenal won the 2016 FA Women's Cup Final at Wembley Stadium, and Natalia and her compatriots Marta Corredera and Vicky Losada all left Arsenal at the end of the 2016 FA WSL season.

== International career ==
After winning the 2004 Under-19 Euro, she was called into the senior national team where she had a brief spell including a 2007 World Cup qualifier match against Finland and the first two matches of 2009 Euro qualifying. She subsequently renounced for personal reasons.

Natalia's goalscoring form in England during the first half of the 2013–14 WSL season saw her recalled to the national squad after a 5-year absence. Coach Ignacio Quereda included her in the 40-player pre-selection for UEFA Women's Euro 2013, but she did not feature in the final 23 player list for the tournament.

After leading the team's goalscoring in the qualifiers, she was part of Spain's squad for the 2015 FIFA Women's World Cup in Canada. But after Quereda was replaced by Jorge Vilda after the World Cup, she soon stopped being called-up along with key veterans of the team such as Sonia Bermúdez and Verónica Boquete.

=== International goals ===
#	Date	Venue	Opponent	Score	Result	Competition
1.	27 October 2013	Ciudad Deportiva, Collado Villalba	Estonia	5–0	6–0	2015 FIFA World Cup qualifying
2.	31 October 2013	Nuevo Matapiñonera, San Sebastián de los Reyes	Italy	2–0	2–0	2015 FIFA World Cup qualifying
3.	23 February 2014	Las Gaunas, Logroño	Macedonia	6–0	12–0	2015 FIFA World Cup qualifying
4.	23 February 2014	Las Gaunas, Logroño	Macedonia	7–0	12–0	2015 FIFA World Cup qualifying
5.	23 February 2014	Las Gaunas, Logroño	Macedonia	10–0	12–0	2015 FIFA World Cup qualifying
6.	23 February 2014	Las Gaunas, Logroño	Macedonia	11–0	12–0	2015 FIFA World Cup qualifying
7.	23 February 2014	Las Gaunas, Logroño	Macedonia	12–0	12–0	2015 FIFA World Cup qualifying
8.	10 April 2014	Training Centre Petar Miloševski, Skopje	Macedonia	0–4	0–10	2015 FIFA World Cup qualifying
9.	8 May 2014	A. Le Coq Arena, Tallinn	Estonia	0–2	0–5	2015 FIFA World Cup qualifying
10.	8 May 2014	A. Le Coq Arena, Tallinn	Estonia	0–4	0–5	2015 FIFA World Cup qualifying
11.	13 September 2014	Stadionul Emil Alexandrescu, Iași	Romania	0–1	0–2	2015 FIFA World Cup qualifying
12.	13 September 2014	Stadionul Emil Alexandrescu, Iași	Romania	0–2	0–2	2015 FIFA World Cup qualifying
13.	21 September 2015	Sports Center, Chenzhou	China	1–2	1–2	Friendly

== Honours ==
=== Club ===
Titles

- Primera División (3): 2008–09, 2009–10, 2010–11
- Copa de la Reina (1): 2008
- FA Women's Cup (1): 2015–16
- FA WSL Cup (1): 2015

Best result in other competitions

- UEFA Champions League (Round of 16): 2010–11, 2011–12
- FA WSL (Third): 2015, 2016

=== International ===
Titles

- UEFA U-19 Euro (1): 2004

Best result in other competitions

- FIFA World Cup (First Stage): 2015
- FIFA U-20 World Cup (First Stage): 2004

== Trivia ==
Her name has often been misspelled as Natalia de Pablos.
