= Cristina Pizarro =

Spanish footballer

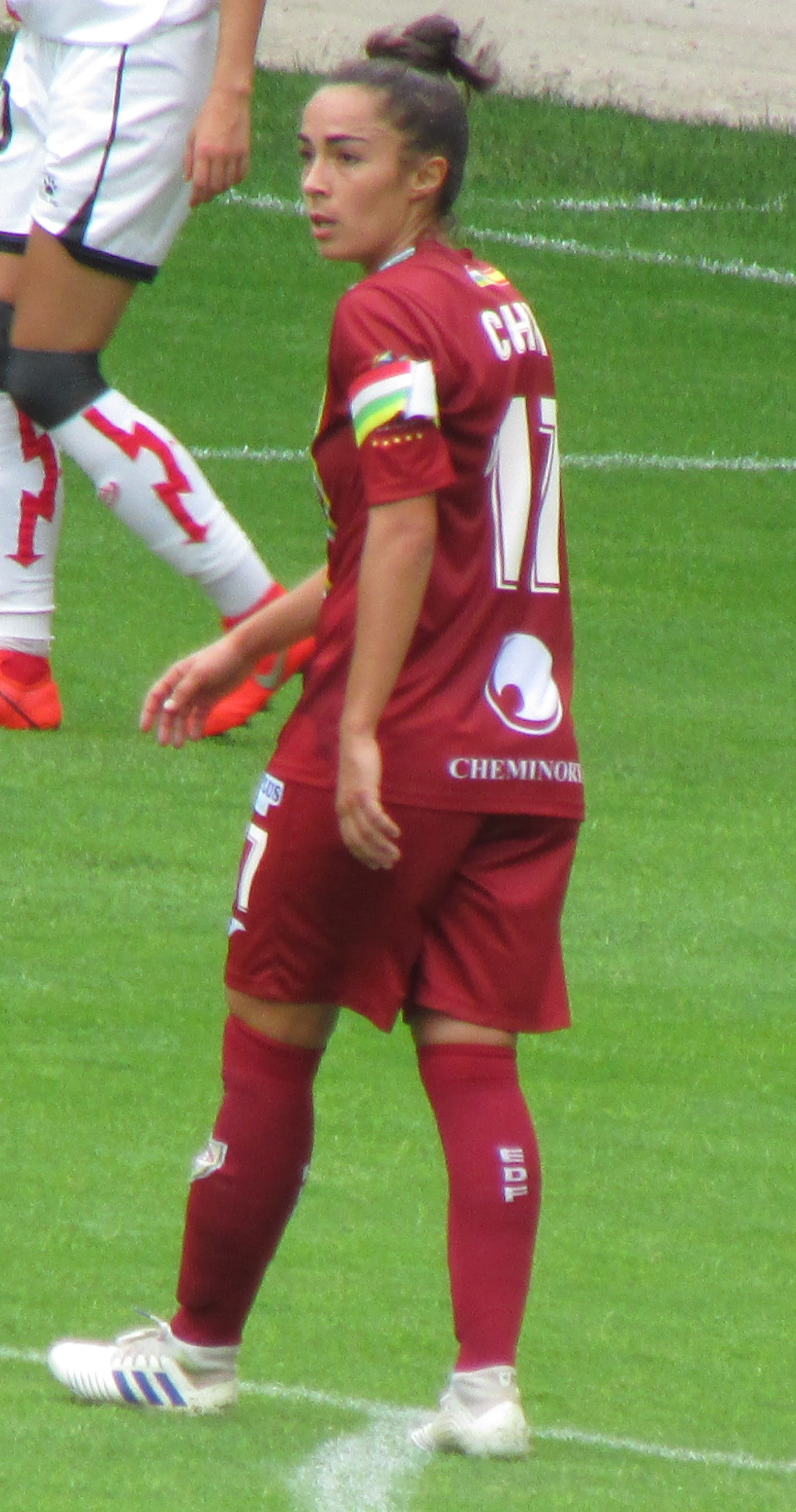
- Pizarro in 2019

Personal information
- Full name: Cristina Pizarro Mingo
- Date of birth: 20 November 1989 (age 36)
- Place of birth: Madrid, Spain
- Height: 1.60 m (5 ft 3 in)
- Position: Defender

Team information
- Current team: Sporting Huelva
- Number: 17

Senior career*
| Years | Team | Apps | (Gls) |
| 2005–2009 | Atlético Madrid | | |
| 2009–2013 | Rayo Vallecano | | |
| 2013–2014 | Sant Gabriel | 23 | (3) |
| 2014–2019 | Real Sociedad | 112 | (5) |
| 2019–2021 | Logroño | 49 | (3) |
| 2021– | Sporting Huelva | 19 | (0) |
- * Club domestic league appearances and goals as of 11:56, 16 September 2021 (UTC)

Cristina Pizarro Mingo (born 20 November 1989), also known as Chini, is a Spanish footballer who plays as a defender for Primera División club Sporting Huelva. She previously played for Atlético Madrid, Rayo Vallecano and Real Sociedad.

== Early life ==
Pizarro earned the nickname 'Chini' because there were two people called Cristina in her football team growing up. The nickname arose because her eyes resembled those of Chinese people. Due to the limited availability of footballs during her childhood, she often played football with bottles, juice cartons or a ball of paper.

== Career ==
She is the first non-Basque player to play for Real Sociedad. Following signing for Logroño in 2019, she provided an assist on her debut. In 2020, she renewed her contract with Logroño. In July 2021, she signed for Sporting Huelva, becoming their fifth signing of the summer.

== Titles ==
- 2 leagues: 2010, 2011
- 1 Queen's Cup: 2019
