= Escola Valls Futbol =

Spanish football club

- Full name: Escola Valls Futbol
- Ground: El Vilar, Valls
- Chairman: (Spain) José Luís Rodríguez
- Manager: (Spain) Ivet Martínez
- League: Segunda División
- 2012-13: Segunda División - Group 3, 2nd
Home colours

Escola Valls Futbol is a Spanish football club from Valls, Tarragona best known for its women's team, formerly known as CFF Tortosa-Ebre and Gimnàstic Tarragona, which currently plays in Segunda División. Other than it, the club is centered in formative football.

== History ==
CFF Tortosa-Ebre played in the second tier between 1995 and 2009, mostly ranking in the middle positions. When RFEF decided to expand the Superliga Femenina with male clubs, Gimnàstic Tarragona bought CFF Tortosa and registered in the premier category. The original club was thus disbanded and relocated from Tortosa to Tarragona.

In its debut season Gimnàstic established a negative record by losing all 24 games, but it was spared from relegation as there were none. The team attained its first victory, a 3–2 win over UE L'Estartit, in the next season's week 2. However, a 16-games losing streak followed, sinking it in the bottom places. Gimnàstic ended the season 3rd to last with 3 wins and 1 draw in 28 games, and was relegated to the second tier.

Following the relegation the club decided to register the team in the third tier instead of the second tier without considering promotion for financial reasons. However, two weeks later the team was handed over to Escola Valls Fútbol, which registered in the second tier. In its debut season representing Valls the team was its group's runner-up 5 points from the promotion play-offs, its best result in the category.

The senior team was finally dissolved in September 2013.

== Season by season ==
=== Men's ===
Season	Tier	Division	Place	Copa del Rey
2005–06	9	3ª Terr.	4th	
2006–07	8	2ª Terr.	9th	
2007–08	8	2ª Terr.	17th	
2008–09	8	2ª Terr.	15th	
2009–10	8	2ª Terr.	17th	
2010–11	8	2ª Terr.	17th	

Season	Tier	Division	Place	Copa del Rey
2011–12	7	3ª Cat.	16th	
2012–13	7	3ª Cat.	5th	
2013–14	7	3ª Cat.	17th	
2014–15	7	3ª Cat.	13th	
2015–16	7	3ª Cat.	17th	

=== Women's ===
- Superliga (2)

22: 2010, 2011

- Primera Nacional, Group 3 (16)

2: 2012, 2013
4: 2003
5: 2006
6: 2005, 2009
7: 1995, 1996, 1997, 2001, 2002
8: 1998, 2008
10: 1999, 2000, 2004
11: 2007
