= María Ruiz (footballer) =

Spanish footballer (born 1983)

Mery
Personal information
- Full name: María Ruiz Román
- Date of birth: 13 June 1983 (age 43)
- Place of birth: Madrid, Spain
- Height: 1.57 m (5 ft 2 in)
- Position: Striker

College career
| Years | Team | Apps | (Gls) |
| 2004–2007 | Park University | | (109) |

Senior career*
| Years | Team | Apps | (Gls) |
| 2001–2003 | Estudiantes Huelva | | |
| 2006 | Sporting Huelva | | |
| 2007–2008 | Indiana | | |
| 2009 | Buffalo Flash | | |
| 2009–2010 | Espanyol | | |
| 2010–2012 | Zvezda Perm | 25 | (8) |
| 2012–2014 | Zorky Krasnogorsk | 46 | (19) |
| 2014–2015 | Kubanochka | 19 | (1) |
| 2015–2019 | Tacón | | |
- * Club domestic league appearances and goals

María Ruiz Román, also known as Mery, is a Spanish football forward.

She has also played in Spain and the United States. With FC Indiana she won the 2007 WPSL. Additionally she was named the Final Four MVP.
