= Lara Rabal =

Spanish footballer (born 1983)

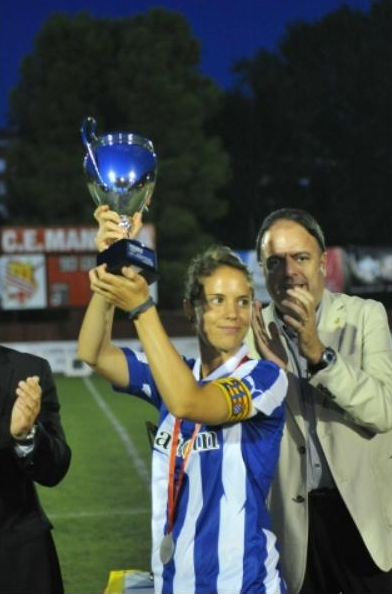

Personal information
- Full name: Lara Rabal Bosch
- Date of birth: 2 April 1983 (age 43)
- Place of birth: Barcelona, Spain
- Height: 1.73 m (5 ft 8 in)
- Position: Midfielder

Senior career*
Years	Team	Apps	(Gls)
1998–2013	Espanyol		
- * Club domestic league appearances and goals

Lara Rabal Bosch (born 2 April 1983) is a Spanish former football midfielder, who spent her entire playing career with RCD Espanyol of Spain's Primera División. She was one of the three captains of the team.

In 2013 Rabal retired from playing but joined Espanyol's coaching staff.

== Titles ==
- Spanish league: 2006
- Spanish Cup: 2006, 2009, 2010
