= Sonia Vesga =

Spanish footballer (born 1980)

Sonia Burgos
Personal information
- Full name: Sonia Vesga Ruiz
- Date of birth: 30 November 1980 (age 45)
- Place of birth: Briviesca, Spain
- Positions: Midfielder; left wing-back

Youth career
- CD NSB Burgos

Senior career*
Years	Team	Apps	(Gls)
–2005	CD Ntra. Sra. de Belén		
2005–2007	Atlético Madrid		
2007–2014	Rayo Vallecano		
2015	Madrid CFF		
2016–	Capiscol CF		

International career
2008–2010	Spain	14	(0)
- * Club domestic league appearances and goals

Sonia Vesga Ruiz, also known as Sonia Burgos in allusion to her birthplace, is a Spanish football midfielder, currently playing for Rayo Vallecano in Primera División.

She was a member of the Spain women's national football team.

== Titles ==
- 3 Spanish Leagues (2009, 2010, 2011)
