= 2016–17 Ligas Regionales (Spanish women's football) =

Regional
- Season: 2016–17

The 2016–17 Ligas Regionales were the third tier of the Spanish women's football. With teams divided into groups by Autonomous Communities, only one team per group promoted to Segunda División.

== Galicia ==
Pos	Team	Pld	W	D	L	GF	GA	GD	Pts	Promotion or relegation
1	Victoria FC (P)	28	23	3	2	88	16	+72	72	Promotion to Segunda División
2	CCAR Valladares	28	21	5	2	81	26	+55	68	
3	UD Ourense	28	19	4	5	63	27	+36	61	
4	Portonovo SD	28	19	4	5	85	33	+52	61	
5	Umia CF	28	15	2	11	75	52	+23	47	
6	RC Deportivo B	28	14	4	10	63	34	+29	46	
7	Sárdoma CF B	28	13	6	9	53	41	+12	45	
8	SCD Milagrosa	28	11	6	11	60	54	+6	39	
9	SD O Val	29	12	2	15	56	75	−19	38	
10	Victoria CF B	28	10	3	15	52	72	−20	33	
11	Torre SD	28	5	7	16	35	59	−24	22	
12	Arcadia EF	28	6	4	18	33	62	−29	22	
13	San Miguel CF	28	6	4	18	45	89	−44	22	
14	CP Alertanavia (R)	28	4	6	18	36	73	−37	18	Relegation to Lower leagues
15	Xuventú Aguiño SD (R)	28	2	1	25	25	137	−112	7	Relegation to Lower leagues
16	CF Bértola Femenino	0	0	0	0	0	0	0	0	Retired from competition

(P) Promoted; (R) Relegated

=== Top scorers ===
Rank	Player	Club	Goals
1	Noemi Gª Rey	SD O Val	37
2	Verónica Rguez. Rial	RC Deportivo B	26
3	Alba Ferré	Umia CF	23
4	Ana Iglesias	CAR Valladares	19
5	Andrea Fdez. Quiroga	CCAR Valladares	18
6	Esther Nuñez	SCD Milagrosa	17
6	Carlota Polo	Portonovo SD	17
8	Lidia Varela	Portonovo SD	16
9	Angela Choren	Victoria FC	14
9	Alexandra Pichel	CCAR Valladares	14

== Asturias ==
Pos	Team	Pld	W	D	L	GF	GA	GD	Pts	Promotion
1	Oviedo Moderno CF B	28	25	2	1	184	24	+160	77	
2	UD Llanera (P)	28	23	3	2	120	26	+94	72	Promotion to Segunda División
3	Sporting Gijón B	28	23	1	4	149	32	+117	70	
4	Oviedo Moderno CF C	28	21	3	4	85	22	+63	66	
5	CF Llosalín	28	20	0	8	128	50	+78	60	
6	UD Gigiafem	28	16	4	8	97	50	+47	52	
7	CD Femiastur B	28	14	1	13	66	56	+10	43	
8	Lada Langreo CF	28	11	3	14	55	79	−24	36	
9	FF Las Vegas	28	10	3	15	58	78	−20	33	
10	Urraca CF	28	9	4	15	41	97	−56	31	
11	UD Prados San Julián	28	7	3	18	33	62	−29	24	
12	Club Hispano	28	3	5	20	35	99	−64	14	
13	Gijón FF B	28	4	1	23	35	108	−73	13	
14	San Juan La Carisa	28	2	4	22	31	143	−112	10	
15	Grisú CF	28	3	1	24	23	224	−201	10	

(P) Promoted

== Castile and León ==
Pos	Team	Pld	W	D	L	GF	GA	GD	Pts	Promotion or relegation
1	León FF (P)	24	19	3	2	97	22	+75	60	Promotion to Segunda División
2	Casa Social Católica de Ávila	24	15	5	4	70	26	+44	50	
3	CD Ponferrada	24	14	3	7	83	39	+44	45	
4	Capiscol CF	24	13	6	5	89	31	+58	45	
5	CD Salamanca FF	24	13	5	6	50	22	+28	44	
6	Arandina CF	24	11	7	6	82	40	+42	40	
7	CD Amigos del Duero B	24	10	4	10	75	57	+18	34	
8	Santa Ana FS	24	9	7	8	65	39	+26	34	
9	CDF Trobajo del Camino	24	10	4	10	57	55	+2	34	
10	CD San Juanillo	24	10	2	12	42	56	−14	32	
11	CD Parquesol B	24	4	1	19	43	84	−41	13	
12	CD Nuestra Señora de Belén B	24	3	3	18	27	83	−56	12	
13	Unión Valdornesa (R)	24	0	0	24	11	237	−226	0	Relegation to Lower leagues

(P) Promoted; (R) Relegated

=== Top scorers ===
Rank	Player	Club	Goals
1	Lucía Rguez. Álvarez	CD Ponferrada	33
2	Irene Martínez	León FF	30
3	Sara Belén Rupérez	Arandina CF	25
4	María Uriel	León FF	24
5	Paula Gª Gómez	Santa Ana FS	23
6	Teresa Vicente	CD Amigos del Duero B	21
7	Lucía Rabanos	Capiscol CF	19
7	Alba Fariza	CD Amigos del Duero B	19
9	Patricia Martín Vegas	Casa Socia Católica de Ávila	18
10	Paula Verdes	CDF Trobajo del Camino	17

== Cantabria ==
Pos	Team	Pld	W	D	L	GF	GA	GD	Pts	Promotion
1	CD Oceja	28	24	2	2	170	30	+140	74	
2	SD Textil Escudo	28	23	3	2	130	47	+83	72	
3	CF Vimenor (Note: Vimenor promoted after the refusal of Oceja and Textil Escudo.) (P)	28	24	0	4	139	43	+96	72	Promotion to Segunda División
4	CD Cayón	28	22	1	5	119	38	+81	67	
5	CD Bezana	28	18	2	8	105	47	+58	56	
6	CD Monte	28	16	1	11	138	66	+72	49	
7	CD Laredo	28	16	1	11	94	77	+17	49	
8	CD Ramales	28	14	4	10	113	69	+44	46	
9	Gimnástica de Torrelavega	28	11	4	13	89	109	−20	37	
10	CD Guriezo	28	9	4	15	69	104	−35	31	
11	CD Colindres	28	8	1	19	55	120	−65	25	
12	CD Tropezón	28	4	0	24	41	142	−101	12	
13	CDB La Encina	28	3	2	23	27	136	−109	11	
14	Ampuero FC	28	2	1	25	37	203	−166	7	

(P) Promoted

=== Top scorers ===
Rank	Player	Club	Goals
1	Alazne Barrio	CD Ramales	44
2	Laura Camino	CD Monte	40
3	Alba Oria	CD Bezana	39
4	Jennifer Acebal	CD Guriezo	38
5	Rebeca Gutiérrez	CD Oceja	37
6	Paula Ortiz	CD Cayón	34
7	Elena Flor	CD Cayón	32
7	Lucía Gª Herrera	SD Textil Escudo	32
9	Laura Nuñez	CF Vimenor	30
10	María Inmaculada García	SD Textil Escudo	29

== Basque Country ==
Pos	Team	Pld	W	D	L	GF	GA	GD	Pts	Promotion or relegation
1	Zarautz KE (P)	30	21	8	1	81	22	+59	71	Promotion to Segunda División
2	Bizkerre FT	30	22	5	3	71	15	+56	71	
3	Oiartzun KE B	30	20	6	4	80	37	+43	66	
4	CD Elorrio	30	16	6	8	55	46	+9	54	
5	Leioako Emakumeak	30	13	11	6	45	25	+20	50	
6	CD Hernani	30	11	5	14	42	52	−10	38	
7	SD Beasain	30	10	7	13	49	51	−2	37	
8	Tolosa CF	30	10	7	13	45	58	−13	37	
9	Pauldarrak B	30	10	7	13	47	58	−11	37	
10	Barakaldo CF	30	10	5	15	34	48	−14	35	
11	Añorga KKE B	30	10	4	16	47	66	−19	34	
12	Erandioko Betiko Neskak	30	9	7	14	44	47	−3	34	
13	CD Ariznabarra (R)	30	8	6	16	50	69	−19	30	Relegation to Lower leagues
14	Aurrerá Vitoria B (R)	30	8	5	17	40	67	−27	29	Relegation to Lower leagues
15	CD Ugao (R)	30	6	6	18	39	82	−43	24	Relegation to Lower leagues
16	ADF Berri-Otxoa (R)	30	6	5	19	39	65	−26	23	Relegation to Lower leagues

(P) Promoted; (R) Relegated

=== Top scorers ===
Rank	Player	Club	Goals
1	Itsasne Larruskain	CD Elorrio	26
2	Marta San Adrián	Añorga KKE B	21
3	Ane López	SD Beasain	20
4	Aitana	Barakaldo CF	15
4	Izaro Zinkunegi	Zarautz KE	15
4	Mantxola	Zarautz KE	15
7	Oihane Ucin	Zarautz KE	14
8	Nagore Lueches	CD Elorrio	13
8	Monik	Zarautz KE	13
9	Ane Abalia	Bizkerre FT	12
9	Naroa Aldeano	Aurrera Vitoria B	12

== Navarre ==
Pos	Team	Pld	W	D	L	GF	GA	GD	Pts	Promotion
1	CA Osasuna (P)	28	26	2	0	148	10	+138	80	Promotion to Segunda División
2	SD Lagunak	28	20	4	4	57	21	+36	64	
3	CD Huarte	28	19	4	5	76	38	+38	61	
4	UDC Burladés	28	18	6	4	88	30	+58	60	
5	CD Kirol Sport	28	19	2	7	85	40	+45	59	
6	Peña Sport FC	28	15	4	9	57	41	+16	49	
7	Gazte Berriak	28	14	3	11	77	56	+21	45	
8	CD Amigó	28	10	5	13	56	62	−6	35	
9	CD Castejón	28	10	4	14	50	63	−13	34	
10	CD Ardoi B	28	7	6	15	32	44	−12	27	
11	SD Alsasua	28	7	3	18	37	81	−44	24	
12	CD Universidad de Navarra	28	7	3	18	29	69	−40	24	
13	CD Zarramonza	28	6	5	17	33	66	−33	23	
14	Beti Kozkor KE	28	5	2	21	30	100	−70	17	
15	CD Iruntxiki de Beriáin	28	0	1	27	8	142	−134	1	

(P) Promoted

== La Rioja ==
There was not any promotion to Segunda División.

Pos	Team	Pld	W	D	L	GF	GA	GD	Pts
1	CD Pradejón	14	12	1	1	113	11	+102	37
2	Atlético Revellín	14	12	1	1	76	12	+64	37
3	Recreativo Villamediana	14	10	2	2	77	19	+58	32
4	EDF Logroño B	14	8	0	6	64	21	+43	24
5	SD Logroñés	14	6	0	8	32	48	−16	18
6	Yagüe CF	14	4	0	10	24	60	−36	12
7	Haro Sport Club	14	1	0	13	11	116	−105	3
8	CEF Nájera	14	1	0	13	6	123	−117	3

=== Top scorers ===
Rank	Player	Club	Goals
1	Sara Carrillo	CD Pradejón	29
2	Garazi Facila	CD Pradejón	25
3	Bárbara Álvarez	Atlético Revellín	16
4	Marta López Villar	Rec. Villamediana	15
5	Alba Covaleda	EDF Logroño B	14
6	Beatriz Sáenz	Atlético Revellín	12
6	Ángela Sanz	Rec. Villamediana	12

== Aragon ==
Final stage

Pos	Team	Pld	W	D	L	GF	GA	GD	Pts	Promotion
1	Peña Ferranca (P)	10	9	0	1	25	12	+13	27	Promotion to Segunda División
2	CD Peñas Oscenses	10	5	3	2	18	11	+7	18	
3	SD Ejea	10	5	2	3	29	22	+7	17	
4	RSD Santa Isabel	10	4	1	5	25	26	−1	13	
5	Zaragoza CFF B	10	1	3	6	13	20	−7	6	
6	CD Delicias	10	0	3	7	8	27	−19	3	

(P) Promoted

== Catalonia ==
Pos	Team	Pld	W	D	L	GF	GA	GD	Pts	Promotion or relegation
1	CF Pardinyes (P)	30	26	0	4	117	33	+84	78	Promotion to Segunda División
2	Cerdanyola del Vallès FC	30	21	4	5	67	27	+40	67	
3	CD Fontsanta-Fatjo	30	19	5	6	82	43	+39	62	
4	CF Sant Pere Pescador	30	20	1	9	81	45	+36	61	
5	UE Sant Andreu	30	14	7	9	61	54	+7	49	
6	UE Porqueres	30	14	7	9	60	50	+10	49	
7	Fundació Atletic Villafranca	30	14	6	10	58	39	+19	48	
8	CF Atlètic Prat	30	13	7	10	54	47	+7	46	
9	Pontenec CE	30	12	4	14	58	77	−19	40	
10	CE Sant Gabriel C	30	11	5	14	57	51	+6	38	
11	SE AEM B	30	11	2	17	51	60	−9	35	
12	CF Molins de Rei	30	8	7	15	47	66	−19	31	
13	CF Femení Tortosa-Ebre	30	8	4	18	40	64	−24	28	
14	La Roca Penya Blanc Blava CF (R)	30	5	9	16	31	62	−31	24	Relegation to Lower leagues
15	EE Guineueta (R)	30	5	4	21	46	103	−57	19	Relegation to Lower leagues
16	Atlètic Camp Clar (R)	30	3	0	27	51	140	−89	9	Relegation to Lower leagues

(P) Promoted; (R) Relegated

=== Top scorers ===
Rank	Player	Club	Goals
1	Ana Núria Rios	FC Sant Pere Pescador	42
2	Alexandra Taberber	Pardinyes CF	29
3	Abril Rodríguez	Fundació Atletic Vilafranca	24
4	Fatoumata Kanteh	UE Porqueres	23
5	Judith Gallardo	Pontec CE	22
6	Anna Rois	CD Fonsanta-Fatjo	21
7	Blanca Coscolin	CF Molins de Rei	20
8	Paula Denis	FC Santpedor	19
8	Joana Roig	Atlètic Camp Clar	19
10	Anna Oriach	Pardinyes CF	18

== Balearic Islands ==
The top team was promoted to Segunda División.

Pos	Team	Pld	W	D	L	GF	GA	GD	Pts	Promotion
1	Sporting de Mahón	20	18	2	0	76	10	+66	56	Promotion to Segunda División
2	Mallorca Toppfotball	20	17	1	2	65	19	+46	52	
3	Athletic Marratxí	20	14	3	3	71	23	+48	45	
4	UD Collerense B	20	12	3	5	76	47	+29	39	
5	CD Algaida	20	8	2	10	43	62	−19	26	
6	La Vileta	20	7	3	10	25	44	−19	24	
7	Atlético Jesús	20	6	3	11	25	47	−22	21	
8	AD Son Sardina	20	6	2	12	43	46	−3	20	
9	SCD Independiente	20	3	3	14	27	48	−21	12	
10	Son Sardina Recreatiu	20	2	6	12	21	63	−42	12	
11	Interplà DT	20	2	2	16	15	78	−63	8	

=== Top scorers ===
Rank	Player	Club	Goals
1	María Barceló	UD Algaida	30
2	Estefanía Rodríguez	Sporting de Mahón	23
3	Desiré Hernández	UD Collerense B	21
4	Elena Montané	UD Collerense B	20
5	Alba Navarro	At. Marratxí	17
6	Tanja Loefshus	Mallorca Toppfotball	14
7	Raquel Vilchez	Mallorca Toppfotball	13
8	Caroline Vad Oestby	Mallorca Toppfotball	11
8	Margalida Cueto	At. Marratxí	11
10	Ana I. Luís	SCD Independiente	10

== Valencian Community ==
The top team was promoted to Segunda División.

Pos	Team	Pld	W	D	L	GF	GA	GD	Pts	Promotion
1	Levante UD C	26	20	3	3	76	19	+57	63	
2	CFF Maritim	26	20	2	4	75	22	+53	62	Promotion to Segunda División
3	Sporting Plaza de Argel B	26	16	3	7	69	39	+30	51	
4	La Torre AC	26	15	4	7	61	28	+33	49	
5	Biensa CF	26	13	3	10	70	66	+4	42	
6	CD Xeraco	26	10	6	10	48	61	−13	36	
7	Villarreal CF B	26	11	3	12	49	58	−9	36	
8	CD Olimpic	26	10	2	14	48	53	−5	32	
9	CD Olímpic de Xàtiva	26	9	4	13	35	52	−17	31	
10	Elche CF B	26	10	1	15	58	60	−2	31	
11	CD Juventud Maniense	26	9	4	13	48	50	−2	31	
12	Valencia CF C	26	8	6	12	32	40	−8	30	Relegation to Lower leagues
13	CF Històrics de València	26	6	8	12	49	69	−20	26	Relegation to Lower leagues
14	Athletic La Vall CF	16	0	1	15	7	108	−101	1	Relegation to Lower leagues

=== Top scorers ===
Rank	Player	Club	Goals
1	Sandra Orts	Històrics de València	27
2	Andrea Okene	Levante UD C	26
3	Ascensión Martínez	Elche CF B	22
4	Susana Rodríguez	Biensa CF	19
5	María Pico	Sporting Plaza de Argel B	18
6	Beatriz Cañas	Juventud Manisense	15
7	María García	Villarreal CF B	14
7	Sara Martínez	Levante UD C	14
7	Mar San Francisco	Biensa CF	14
10	Paula Burguera	CFF Maritim	13
