= 2019–20 Primera Nacional de Fútbol (women) =

Spanish women's 3rd tier association football season

Primera Nacional
- Season: 2019–20

The 2019–20 Primera Nacional de Fútbol was the 19th edition of this league and the first season as the Spanish women's football third-tier league.

On 6 May 2020, the Royal Spanish Football Federation announced the premature end of the league, revoking relegations and planning a new format for the promotion playoffs, to be played if possible by the seven group leaders and the best second qualified team.

== Format ==
Teams were confirmed on 31 July 2019. Three days after the confirmation, Atlántida Matamá, that previously resigned to promotion to Segunda División Pro, withdrew from the competition.

The seven first-placed teams and the runner-up with the most points will qualify for the promotion playoffs. The four winners of the four ties, decided by the luck of the draw, will be promoted to Segunda División Pro for the next season.

== Group 1 ==
Pos	Team	Pld	W	D	L	GF	GA	GD	Pts	Qualification or relegation
1	Monte	19	13	3	3	60	15	+45	42	Qualification to promotion playoffs
2	Viajes Interrías	19	13	3	3	49	21	+28	42	Possible qualification to promotion playoffs
3	Victoria FC	19	11	4	4	43	18	+25	37	
4	Oviedo B	19	10	7	2	33	17	+16	37	
5	Deportivo La Coruña B	19	10	3	6	40	21	+19	33	
6	Valladares	19	10	2	7	37	30	+7	32	
7	Sporting Gijón B	19	8	3	8	29	35	−6	27	
8	Victoria CF	19	7	4	8	29	31	−2	25	
9	Sárdoma	19	6	5	8	31	25	+6	23	
10	Gijón	19	5	4	10	23	40	−17	19	
11	Oceja	19	4	5	10	25	50	−25	17	
12	Racing Santander B	19	4	3	12	25	56	−31	15	
13	Umia	19	3	5	11	20	41	−21	14	
14	Atlético Arousana	19	1	5	13	18	62	−44	8	

Source: Futbolme
Rules for classification: 1) Points; 2) Head-to-head record; 3) Goal difference; 4) Number of goals scored

== Group 2 ==
Pos	Team	Pld	W	D	L	GF	GA	GD	Pts	Qualification or relegation
1	Añorga	19	14	2	3	51	16	+35	44	Qualification to promotion playoffs
2	Bizkerre	19	14	1	4	35	15	+20	43	Possible qualification to promotion playoffs
3	San Ignacio	19	11	5	3	42	23	+19	38	
4	Pradejón	19	11	4	4	31	17	+14	37	
5	Arratia	19	9	4	6	38	26	+12	31	
6	Berriozar	19	9	2	8	30	35	−5	29	
7	Osasuna B	19	9	1	9	30	22	+8	28	
8	Aurrerá Vitoria	19	6	9	4	35	31	+4	27	
9	Oiartzun	19	7	4	8	24	27	−3	25	
10	Atlético Revellín	19	5	4	10	22	29	−7	19	
11	Mulier	19	5	2	12	17	34	−17	17	
12	Tolosa	19	3	6	10	17	36	−19	15	
13	Logroño B	19	3	4	12	19	40	−21	13	
14	Huarte	19	2	2	15	9	49	−40	8	

Source: Futbolme
Rules for classification: 1) Points; 2) Head-to-head record; 3) Goal difference; 4) Number of goals scored

== Group 3 ==
Pos	Team	Pld	W	D	L	GF	GA	GD	Pts	Qualification or relegation
1	Espanyol B	19	17	1	1	63	12	+51	52	Qualification to promotion playoffs
2	Sant Gabriel	19	13	4	2	41	14	+27	43	Possible qualification to promotion playoffs
3	Son Sardina	19	10	5	4	30	21	+9	35	
4	Levante Las Planas	19	11	2	6	52	24	+28	35	
5	Europa	19	9	4	6	38	33	+5	31	
6	Igualada	19	7	5	7	47	29	+18	26	
7	Atlético Baleares	19	7	4	8	20	24	−4	25	
8	Vic Ruiprimer Refo	19	7	3	9	31	38	−7	24	
9	Pardinyes	19	7	3	9	37	45	−8	24	
10	Terrassa	19	7	2	10	25	40	−15	23	
11	Sant Pere Pescador	19	6	3	10	31	42	−11	21	
12	Huesca	19	6	2	11	31	34	−3	20	
13	Pallejà	19	4	3	12	25	37	−12	15	
14	Mallorca Toppfotball	19	1	1	17	8	86	−78	4	

Source: Futbolme
Rules for classification: 1) Points; 2) Head-to-head record; 3) Goal difference; 4) Number of goals scored

== Group 4 ==
Pos	Team	Pld	W	D	L	GF	GA	GD	Pts	Qualification or relegation
1	Real Betis B	19	16	3	0	67	8	+59	51	Qualification to promotion playoffs
2	Cádiz	19	13	4	2	37	10	+27	43	Possible qualification to promotion playoffs
3	Badajoz	19	13	3	3	50	12	+38	42	
4	Málaga B	19	13	3	3	51	18	+33	42	
5	Extremadura	19	11	5	3	53	18	+35	38	
6	Almería	19	10	4	5	30	14	+16	34	
7	La Rambla	19	8	2	9	35	34	+1	26	
8	Santa Teresa B	19	7	2	10	44	47	−3	23	
9	Sporting Huelva B	19	6	2	11	29	35	−6	20	
10	Cáceres Atlético	19	6	2	11	20	38	−18	20	
11	Castuera	19	5	3	11	30	48	−18	18	
12	Híspalis	19	4	2	13	25	56	−31	14	
13	San Miguel	19	3	1	15	18	57	−39	10	
14	Peña El Valle	19	0	0	19	5	99	−94	0	

Source: Futbolme
Rules for classification: 1) Points; 2) Head-to-head record; 3) Goal difference; 4) Number of goals scored

== Group 5 ==
Pos	Team	Pld	W	D	L	GF	GA	GD	Pts	Qualification or relegation
1	La Solana	19	12	3	4	38	15	+23	39	Qualification to promotion playoffs
2	Salamanca FF	19	10	4	5	61	33	+28	34	Possible qualification to promotion playoffs
3	Atlético Madrid C	19	9	7	3	45	17	+28	34	
4	Alhóndiga	19	10	4	5	24	18	+6	34	
5	CFF Albacete	19	10	4	5	27	23	+4	34	
6	Samper	19	9	5	5	36	24	+12	32	
7	Tres Cantos	19	6	7	6	28	31	−3	25	
8	Rayo Vallecano B	19	6	6	7	37	36	+1	24	
9	Dinamo Guadalajara	19	6	5	8	21	27	−6	23	
10	Olímpico Madrid	19	5	6	8	26	29	−3	21	
11	Olímpico León	19	6	3	10	23	46	−23	21	
12	San Pío X	19	4	7	8	32	45	−13	19	
13	Torrelodones	19	4	5	10	33	46	−13	17	
14	Nuestra Señora de Belén	19	2	2	15	17	58	−41	8	

Source: Futbolme
Rules for classification: 1) Points; 2) Head-to-head record; 3) Goal difference; 4) Number of goals scored

== Group 6 ==
Pos	Team	Pld	W	D	L	GF	GA	GD	Pts	Qualification or relegation
1	Unión Viera	19	15	2	2	65	12	+53	47	Qualification to promotion playoffs
2	Furia Arona	19	15	2	2	46	11	+35	47	Possible qualification to promotion playoffs
3	La Garita	19	12	5	2	51	24	+27	41	
4	Tacuense B	19	11	1	7	52	26	+26	34	
5	Atlético Unión de Güímar	19	10	3	6	39	32	+7	33	
6	Julio Suárez	19	9	2	8	38	33	+5	29	
7	Las Majoreras-Guayadeque	19	7	8	4	33	30	+3	29	
8	Achamán	19	7	5	7	26	29	−3	26	
9	San Antonio Pilar	19	7	3	9	31	32	−1	24	
10	Tarsa	19	6	3	10	37	46	−9	21	
11	Llano del Moro	19	5	5	9	37	38	−1	20	
12	Montaña Alta	19	2	5	12	14	59	−45	11	
13	Sanse	19	2	1	16	20	68	−48	7	
14	Las Torres	19	1	3	15	11	60	−49	6	

Source: Futbolme
Rules for classification: 1) Points; 2) Head-to-head record; 3) Goal difference; 4) Number of goals scored

== Group 7 ==
Pos	Team	Pld	W	D	L	GF	GA	GD	Pts	Qualification or relegation
1	Aldaia	19	14	5	0	52	12	+40	47	Qualification to promotion playoffs
2	Joventut Almassora	19	15	2	2	52	12	+40	47	Possible qualification to promotion playoffs
3	Sporting Plaza de Argel	19	13	2	4	50	20	+30	41	
4	Elche	19	10	4	5	32	23	+9	34	
5	Mislata	19	8	6	5	37	33	+4	30	
6	Discóbolo-La Torre	19	8	4	7	38	30	+8	28	
7	Lorca FAD	19	9	1	9	29	23	+6	28	
8	Fundación Albacete B	19	8	4	7	26	25	+1	28	
9	Villarreal B	19	6	3	10	32	31	+1	21	
10	Murcia Féminas	19	5	4	10	27	49	−22	19	
11	Levante C	19	4	3	12	22	49	−27	15	
12	Valencia C	19	3	6	10	29	36	−7	15	
13	Ciudad de Murcia	19	4	0	15	21	76	−55	12	
14	Marítim	19	2	4	13	16	44	−28	10	

Source: Futbolme
Rules for classification: 1) Points; 2) Head-to-head record; 3) Goal difference; 4) Number of goals scored

== Ranking of second-placed teams ==
Pos	Grp	Team	Pld	W	D	L	GF	GA	GD	Pts	Qualification
1	7	Joventut Almassora	19	15	2	2	52	12	+40	47	Qualification to promotion playoffs
2	6	Furia Arona	19	15	2	2	46	11	+35	47	
3	3	Sant Gabriel	19	13	4	2	41	14	+27	43	
4	4	Cádiz	19	13	4	2	37	10	+27	43	
5	2	Bizkerre	19	14	1	4	35	15	+20	43	
6	1	Viajes Interrías	19	13	3	3	49	21	+28	42	
7	5	Salamanca FF	19	10	4	5	61	33	+28	34	

Rules for classification: 1) Points; 2) Goal difference; 3) Goals scored.

== Promotion playoffs ==
Initially planned as a double-legged playoff, after the suspension due to the COVID-19 pandemic, the Federation changed the system to a single-legged format to be played if possible on 25 and 26 July.

Team 1	Score	Team 2
Joventut Almassora	1–0	Real Betis B
Añorga	0–1	Aldaia
Monte	1–2	Espanyol B
La Solana	1–0	Unión Viera
