= 2014–15 Ligas Regionales (Spanish women's football) =

Regional
- Season: 2014–15

== Galicia ==
The top team will promoted to 2015–16 Segunda División (women).

Pos	Team	Pld	W	D	L	GF	GA	GD	Pts
1	Atlético Arouana	26	23	1	2	145	23	+122	70
2	SD Tordoia	26	21	2	3	89	25	+64	65
3	SD O Val	26	16	4	6	63	37	+26	52
4	SCD Milagrosa	26	14	7	5	67	27	+40	49
5	CCAR Valladares	26	14	6	6	57	36	+21	48
6	Atlantida Matama	26	12	7	7	44	33	+11	43
7	AD Lavadores	26	12	3	11	62	71	−9	39
8	SD Orzán "B"	26	9	6	11	38	43	−5	33
9	ACRD Boiro	26	8	5	13	33	42	−9	29
10	Moledo CF	26	8	2	16	28	79	−51	26
11	San Miguel CF	26	6	2	18	41	74	−33	20
12	CD Beluso	26	5	3	18	23	62	−39	18
13	Cacheiras SD	26	4	4	18	30	105	−75	16
14	Ciudad de Pontevedra CF	26	3	2	21	18	81	−63	11

=== Top scorers ===
Rank	Player	Club	Goals
1	Rebeca Puente	SD Tordoia	45
2	Bárbara Sierra	Atlético Arousana	32
3	Andrea Fernández	AD Lavadores	30
4	Sabela Uríz	SCD Milagrosa	28
5	Raquel Mtnez. Padín	Atlético Arousana	25
6	Mirian Señorans	Atlético Arousana	23
7	Noemi Gª Rey	SD O Val	22
8	María D. Villa	CCAR Valladares	21
9	Lucía Pujol	Atlético Arousana	17
10	Rosa Pardal	Atlético Arousana	16

== Asturias ==
The top team will promoted to 2015–16 Segunda División (women).

Pos	Team	Pld	W	D	L	GF	GA	GD	Pts
1	CD Femiastur	22	19	3	0	143	15	+128	60
2	Oviedo Moderno CF "C"	22	16	4	2	80	22	+58	52
3	Langreo Femenino	22	15	4	3	96	20	+76	49
4	CD Manuel Rubio	22	14	3	5	69	28	+41	45
5	CF Llosalín	22	13	3	6	83	34	+49	42
6	UD Llanera	22	13	2	7	60	36	+24	41
7	Oviedo 06	22	7	5	10	57	56	+1	26
8	CD Femiastur "B"	22	7	2	13	31	61	−30	23
9	Gijón FF "B"	22	7	0	15	49	115	−66	21
10	Oviedo 06 "B"	22	3	1	18	22	103	−81	10
11	Club Hispano	22	2	2	18	14	90	−76	8
12	UD Prados San Julián	22	1	1	20	4	128	−124	4

== Castille and León ==
The top team will promoted to 2015–16 Segunda División (women).

Pos	Team	Pld	W	D	L	GF	GA	GD	Pts
1	Capiscol CF	32	26	6	0	108	18	+90	84
2	CD San Pío X	32	24	5	3	138	38	+100	77
3	León FF	32	21	5	6	88	35	+53	68
4	CD Ponferrada	32	21	3	8	87	48	+39	66
5	Santa Ana FS	32	19	5	8	87	50	+37	62
6	Arandina CF	32	19	4	9	81	53	+28	61
7	CDF Trobajo del Camino	32	16	6	10	96	57	+39	54
8	CD Parquesol "B"	32	13	7	12	34	39	−5	46
9	CD Laguna Promesas	32	14	3	15	64	70	−6	45
10	CD Salamanca FF "B"	32	10	8	14	63	72	−9	38
11	CD San Juanillo	32	11	5	16	74	85	−11	38
12	CD Carbajosa	32	10	7	15	42	46	−4	37
13	CP Casa Social Católica "B"	32	7	6	19	47	107	−60	27
14	CD Amigos del Duero "B"	32	7	5	20	57	93	−36	26
15	CD Nuestra Señora de Belén "B"	32	7	3	22	52	103	−51	24
16	Unión Valdornesa CD	32	3	3	26	37	136	−99	12
17	CD Unión Arroyo	32	3	1	28	50	166	−116	10

=== Top scorers ===
Rank	Player	Club	Goals
1	Cristina Martínez	Santa Ana FS	42
2	Sara Belén Rupérez	Arandina CF	34
3	Mónica Camarón	Unión Arroyo	32
3	Lucía Rabanos	Capiscol CF	32
5	Sandra Luengo	CD San Pío X	29
6	Ana Marina Prieto	CDF Trobajo del Camino	27
7	Beatriz Esteban	Amigos del Duero "B"	24
7	Paulita Pastor	CD Ponferrada	24
9	Lorena Gª Merino	CD San Pío X	23
10	Nadia Torio	CD San Juanillo	20
10	Ruth Vadillo	CD Laguna	20

== Cantabria ==
The top team will promoted to 2015–16 Segunda División (women).

Pos	Team	Pld	W	D	L	GF	GA	GD	Pts
1	CD Tropezón	12	10	2	0	82	10	+72	32
2	SD Reocín "B"	12	8	3	1	79	25	+54	27
3	AD Mioño	12	8	1	3	83	30	+53	25
4	Ampuero FC	12	5	0	7	53	50	+3	15
5	CD Naval	12	4	2	6	44	42	+2	14
6	CD Laredo	12	3	0	9	28	88	−60	9
7	SD Textil Escudo	12	0	0	12	10	134	−124	0

=== Top scorers ===
Rank	Player	Club	Goals
1	Jennifer Acebal	AD Mioño	21
2	Alazne Barrio	SD Reocín "B"	20
3	Ana Perrino	AD Mioño	18
4	Margarita Herrero	SD Tropezón	17
5	Beatriz Bustamante	SD Tropezón	16
5	Cristina Mesones	Ampuero FC	16
5	Aroa Valcuende	SD Reocín "B"	16

== Basque Country ==
The top team will promoted to 2015–16 Segunda División (women).

Pos	Team	Pld	W	D	L	GF	GA	GD	Pts
1	SD Eibar	26	19	5	2	62	15	+47	62
2	Leioako Emakumeak Sarriena FKE	26	18	5	3	42	14	+28	59
3	CD Gasteizko Neskak	26	17	5	4	67	31	+36	56
4	Bizkerre FT	26	13	8	5	44	23	+21	47
5	CD Arratia	26	13	3	10	47	34	+13	42
6	Barakaldo CF	26	9	9	8	31	37	−6	36
7	Erandioko Betiko Neskak FKE	26	9	8	9	37	42	−5	35
8	SD Beasain	26	9	6	11	45	38	+7	33
9	Peña Athletic de Santurtzi CF	26	8	5	13	29	55	−26	29
10	Zarautz KE	26	8	5	13	49	44	+5	29
11	CD Hernani	26	8	5	13	36	35	+1	29
12	ADF Berrio-Otxoa	26	8	4	14	34	41	−7	28
13	Tolosa CF	26	6	4	16	45	64	−19	22
14	CD Lantarón	26	1	0	25	18	113	−95	3

=== Top scorers ===
Rank	Player	Club	Goals
1	Mery	Gasteizko Neskak	22
2	Mar	Tolosa CF	16
3	Haizea	SD Eibar	15
4	Izaro	Zarautz KE	14
5	Yaiza	CD Arratia	12
6	Ainhoa A.	SD Eibar	11
6	Olatz	Bizkerre FT	11
8	Ainoa	Leioako ESFKE	10
8	Jenni	Gasteizko Neskak	10

== Navarra ==
The top team will promoted to 2015–16 Segunda División (women).

Pos	Team	Pld	W	D	L	GF	GA	GD	Pts
1	Mulier FCN	28	26	1	1	156	17	+139	79
2	Berriozar CF	28	21	5	2	90	29	+61	68
3	UDC Burladés	28	18	6	4	60	32	+28	60
4	CD Castejón	28	16	6	6	68	32	+36	54
5	CD Huarte	28	14	5	9	62	49	+13	47
6	CD Ardoi "B"	28	12	7	9	41	37	+4	43
7	SD Lagunak	28	12	6	10	49	55	−6	42
8	CA Marcilla Aurora	28	10	8	10	49	58	−9	38
9	CD Izarra	28	11	4	13	56	63	−7	37
10	CD Kirol Sport	28	9	6	13	35	48	−13	33
11	CD Amigó	28	6	5	17	42	91	−49	23
12	Peña Sport FC	28	5	8	15	27	49	−22	23
13	CD Zarramonza	23	4	5	14	24	66	−42	17
14	CD Universidad de Navarra	28	5	1	22	30	92	−62	16
15	CD Iruntxiki de Beriain	28	3	3	22	20	91	−71	12

== La Rioja ==
The top team will promoted to 2015–16 Segunda División (women).

Pos	Team	Pld	W	D	L	GF	GA	GD	Pts
1	EDF Logroño "B"	12	9	2	1	65	13	+52	29
2	Atlético Revellín	12	9	1	2	49	9	+40	28
3	Recreativo Villamediana	12	7	1	4	54	18	+36	22
4	CEF Najera	12	6	1	5	52	39	+13	19
5	CD Pradejón	12	6	0	6	49	25	+24	18
6	Yagüe CF	12	2	1	9	14	54	−40	7
7	Haro Sport Club	12	0	0	12	3	128	−125	0

=== Top scorers ===
Rank	Player	Club	Goals
1	Carmen Sobrón	CEF Najera	18
2	Garazi Facila	CD Pradejón	13
2	Judith Luzuriaga	CEF Najera	13
4	Laura Jiménez	Atlético Revellín	12
5	Izaskun Muñoz	EDF Logroño "B"	11
5	Celia Ochoa	EDF Logroño "B"	11

== Aragón ==
The top team will promoted to 2015–16 Segunda División (women).

Territorial 1

Pos	Team	Pld	W	D	L	GF	GA	GD	Pts
1	CD Calanda	20	16	0	4	74	20	+54	48
2	AD Peñaflor	20	14	3	3	64	21	+43	45
3	Cella CF	20	13	3	4	76	20	+56	42
4	Villanueva CF	20	12	3	5	83	23	+60	39
5	San Antonio CF	20	12	3	5	45	21	+24	39
6	Eureka 7	20	9	3	8	62	36	+26	30
7	CD Transportes Alcaine "C"	20	7	5	8	39	26	+13	26
8	Calatayud EFB	20	5	2	13	54	53	+1	17
9	UD Aragonesa	20	5	2	13	41	72	−31	17
10	Atlético Monzalbarba	20	5	0	15	27	77	−50	15
11	San Antonio CF "B"	20	0	0	20	3	199	−196	0

Territorial 2

Pos	Team	Pld	W	D	L	GF	GA	GD	Pts
1	Peña Ferranca	18	14	2	2	57	23	+34	44
2	CD Peñas Oscenses	18	14	1	3	72	9	+63	43
3	CD Delicias	18	11	2	5	48	30	+18	35
4	SD Ejea	18	10	2	6	59	44	+15	32
5	CF Utebo	18	8	5	5	47	30	+17	29
6	CD Transportes Alcaine "D"	18	8	2	8	33	27	+6	26
7	CD Peñas Oscenses "B"	18	6	3	9	18	33	−15	21
8	CD Transportes Alcaine "E"	18	6	1	11	28	50	−22	19
9	Peña Ferranca "B"	18	1	3	14	12	50	−38	6
10	CD Zuera	18	1	1	16	10	88	−78	4

=== Promotion ===
Pos	Team	Pld	W	D	L	GF	GD	Pts
1	CD Peñas Oscenses	6	4	2	0	15	2	14
2	Peña Ferranca	6	4	1	1	23	7	13
3	CD Calanda	6	2	1	3	12	16	7
4	AD Peñaflor	6	0	0	6	8	33	0

== Catalunya ==
The top team will promoted to 2015–16 Segunda División (women).

Pos	Team	Pld	W	D	L	GF	GA	GD	Pts
1	CF La Roca Penya Blanc Blava	30	21	5	4	92	45	+47	68
2	CF Pallejá	30	18	8	4	60	23	+37	62
3	Cerdanyola del Vallés FC	30	16	10	4	67	27	+40	58
4	CE Sant Gabriel "C"	30	17	7	6	62	34	+28	58
5	CE Sabadell FC	30	17	6	7	72	36	+36	57
6	CF Sant Pere Pescador	30	17	4	9	81	44	+37	55
7	CF Pardinyes	29	17	3	9	69	56	+13	54
8	CF Atlètic Prat	30	15	4	11	74	44	+30	49
9	CD Fontsanta-Fatjo	30	12	7	11	53	54	−1	43
10	CF Parroquial Santa Eugenia	30	11	6	13	64	73	−9	39
11	CF Femeni Tortosa-Ebre	29	6	10	13	49	58	−9	28
12	EE Guineueta	30	6	8	16	38	83	−45	26
13	CF Santpedor	30	7	4	19	56	88	−32	25
14	UD Sant Quirze Besora	30	5	5	20	36	80	−44	20
15	EF Bonaire	30	4	7	19	40	85	−45	19
16	Llerona CE	30	2	2	26	40	123	−83	8

== Balearic Islands ==
The top team will promoted to 2015–16 Segunda División (women).

Pos	Team	Pld	W	D	L	GF	GA	GD	Pts
1	UD Collerense "B"	16	10	3	3	38	12	+26	33
2	Sporting Mahón	16	9	4	3	38	21	+17	31
3	CD Algaida	16	8	5	3	41	32	+9	29
4	Pollença I Port	16	7	4	5	34	21	+13	25
5	Porto Cristo	16	7	4	5	38	26	+12	25
6	SCD Independiente	16	6	3	7	30	29	+1	21
7	AD Son Sardina "B"	16	6	2	8	26	38	−12	20
8	Atlético Jesús	16	4	4	8	26	38	−12	16
9	Serralta	16	0	1	15	17	69	−52	1

=== Top scorers ===
Rank	Player	Club	Goals
1	María Barceló	CD Algaida	16
2	Esmeralda Mendoza	Pollença I Port	13
3	Yolanda Bonnin	SCD Independiente	10
3	Cristina Ximelis	CD Algaida	10
5	Ruth Álvarez	Collerense "B"	9
5	Irene Asensio	Son Sardina "B"	9

== Valencian Community ==
The top team will promoted to 2015–16 Segunda División (women).

Pos	Team	Pld	W	D	L	GF	GA	GD	Pts
1	Mislata CF	26	20	3	3	77	22	+55	63
2	Levante UD "C"	26	17	4	5	68	33	+35	55
3	Sporting Plaza de Argel "B"	26	16	3	7	62	35	+27	51
4	CFF Maritim "B"	26	16	2	8	59	39	+20	50
5	Villarreal CF "B"	26	12	8	6	64	42	+22	44
6	Aspe UD	26	14	2	10	56	37	+19	44
7	CD El Campello	26	13	2	11	50	35	+15	41
8	Valencia CF "C"	26	11	2	13	48	57	−9	35
9	CD Olímpic de Xátiva	26	9	7	10	55	61	−6	34
10	CD Xeraco	26	9	5	12	51	60	−9	32
11	CD DRAC Castellón	26	7	6	13	48	57	−9	27
12	UD Canals	26	7	4	15	31	52	−21	25
13	UD Alginet	26	3	3	20	28	80	−52	12
14	CF Miramar	26	2	1	23	28	115	−87	7

=== Top scorers ===
Rank	Player	Club	Goals
1	Sandra Mtnez. Duet	Mislata CF	18
2	Paula Larrosa	CD Xeraco	17
3	Clara Renard	CFF Maritim "B"	15
3	Tania Schez. Romero	Levante UD "C"	15
5	Mª Teresa Morte	UD Alginet	14
5	Aida Samit	Villarreal CF "B"	14
5	Alejandra Serrano	Levante UD "C"	14
8	Jennyfer Blasco	CFF Maritim "B"	10
8	Júlia Deza	DRAC Castellón	10
8	Victoria Esteve	CD El Campello	10

== Región de Murcia ==
The top team will promoted to 2015–16 Segunda División (women).

Pos	Team	Pld	W	D	L	GF	GA	GD	Pts
1	AD Atlético Zeneta	34	32	1	1	203	26	+177	97
2	CD Minerva Feminas	34	29	3	2	217	33	+184	90
3	Murcia Feminas	34	25	6	3	154	34	+120	81
4	AD Ceutí Feminas	34	23	3	8	151	36	+115	72
5	Mar Menor CF	34	21	4	9	113	65	+48	67
6	Puente Tocinos Femenino	34	20	5	9	140	52	+88	65
7	AF Cartagena Feminas	34	18	5	11	109	72	+37	59
8	Cartagena FC	34	17	4	13	105	63	+42	55
9	CFF Siscar	34	12	6	16	88	118	−30	42
10	AD Pliego	34	11	7	16	68	80	−12	40
11	FC Pinatar	34	11	7	16	63	72	−9	40
12	Atlético Noroeste	34	12	4	18	81	103	−22	40
13	Murcia Femenino CF	34	11	5	18	54	83	−29	38
14	AD Soledad Feminas	34	10	3	21	51	111	−60	33
15	EF Vistalegre - Los Mateos	34	9	0	25	45	209	−164	27
16	Atlético Pulpileño	34	4	4	26	28	151	−123	16
17	AD El Llano	34	5	1	28	52	165	−113	16
18	AD Soledad Feminas "B"	34	2	0	32	23	272	−249	6

=== Top scorers ===
Rank	Player	Club	Goals
1	Ana Álvarez	AD Atlético Zeneta	75
2	Mª José Tirado	Murcia Feminas	67
3	Francisca Requena	Mar Menor CF	58
4	Noelia Rguez. Gómez	CD Minerva	52
5	Laura Díaz Cruz	Puente Tocinos	35
6	María Campillo	CD Minerva	33
7	María Mtnez. Ríos	AD Atlético Zeneta	32
8	Ana Belén Mulero	CD Minerva	29
8	Jennifer Quesada	Atlético Noroeste	29
10	Ainara Rodríguez	Cartagena Feminas	25
11	Irene Aragón	Puente Tocinos	24
12	Tania Hdez. Oñate	CFF Siscar	23
13	Samanta Díaz	Cartagena Feminas	22

== Andalusia ==
The top team will promoted to 2015–16 Segunda División (women).

=== Almería ===
Pos	Team	Pld	W	D	L	GF	GA	GD	Pts
1	Atlético Benahadux	16	13	1	2	38	18	+20	40
2	UDC Pavia	16	10	2	4	39	20	+19	32
3	Parador Roquetas	16	9	5	2	43	24	+19	32
4	CD Huercal	16	9	3	4	39	23	+16	30
5	PD Garrucha	16	9	1	6	32	22	+10	28
6	Huercalense Atlético	16	6	2	8	39	48	−9	20
7	Comarca Río Nacimiento	16	2	2	12	28	76	−48	8
8	CD Peña Regiones	16	2	3	11	19	46	−27	9

Top scorer: Laura Gª Delgado (Comarca Río Nacimiento), 23 goals

=== Granada ===
Pos	Team	Pld	W	D	L	GF	GA	GD	Pts
1	Arenas de Armilla	12	10	1	1	65	9	+56	31
2	CD Numancia	12	9	2	1	56	11	+45	29
3	Granada CF "B"	12	8	0	4	49	14	+35	24
4	Albolote CF	12	5	3	4	33	23	+10	18
5	Celtic CF	12	3	1	8	30	20	+10	10
6	UD Maracena	12	3	1	8	26	43	−17	10
7	CD Nazarí	12	0	0	12	2	141	−139	0

Top Scorer: Sara Grez. Echeverría (CD Numancia), 17 goals

=== Huelva ===
Pos	Team	Pld	W	D	L	GF	GA	GD	Pts
1	Sporting de Huelva "B"	12	12	0	0	83	11	+72	36
2	AD Pérz Cubillas	12	8	0	4	38	22	+16	24
3	Sporting de Huelva "C"	12	6	2	4	42	35	+7	20
4	PMD Punta Umbria	12	4	4	4	24	25	−1	16
5	CDFB El Campillo	12	4	0	8	27	48	−21	12
6	Castillejos Atlético	12	3	1	8	13	40	−27	10
7	Santa Bárbara	12	1	1	10	8	54	−46	4

Top scorer: Diana González (Sporting de Huelva), 25 goals

=== Sevilla ===
Pos	Team	Pld	W	D	L	GF	GA	GD	Pts
1	Sevilla FC "B"	14	13	0	1	59	5	+54	39
2	Estudiantes de Sevilla	14	11	1	2	66	7	+59	34
3	Estrella San Agustín	14	11	0	3	37	19	+18	33
4	CD Híspalis "B"	14	8	1	5	27	26	+1	25
5	CD Gelves	14	3	3	8	25	33	−8	12
6	Azahar CF	14	3	2	9	20	43	−23	11
7	CD Utrera	14	1	2	11	13	55	−42	5
8	CD Cabecense	14	0	3	11	8	67	−59	3

Top scorer: Rosario Díaz Hueso (Sevilla FC), 26 goals

=== Cádiz ===
Pos	Team	Pld	W	D	L	GF	GA	GD	Pts
1	El Puerto UP	20	17	1	2	54	12	+42	52
2	Salesianos Algeciras	19	15	0	4	42	14	+28	45
3	Jérez Industrial CF	20	13	2	5	33	20	+13	41
4	CD Guadalcacín	20	11	2	7	31	20	+11	35
5	Puente mayorga CD	20	8	1	11	27	29	−2	25
6	Juventud Chiclana	20	6	2	12	23	25	−2	20
7	CD Pastora 1966	20	4	2	14	7	48	−41	14
8	Arcos AD	20	3	4	13	22	43	−21	13
9	CDS Polideportivo Cádiz "B"	20	4	1	15	8	38	−30	13

Top scorer: Celenia Afán (Jérez Industrial CF), 17 goals

=== Córdoba ===
Pos	Team	Pld	W	D	L	GF	GA	GD	Pts
1	CD Pozoalbense	12	10	1	1	46	15	+31	31
2	Cultural Palomera-Naranjo	12	9	0	3	39	15	+24	27
3	Atlético Menciano	12	4	1	7	23	23	0	13
4	Paquillo Moreno CD	12	0	0	12	5	60	−55	0

Top scorer: Mar Villarreal (CD Pozoalbense), 17 goals

=== Jaén ===
Pos	Team	Pld	W	D	L	GF	GA	GD	Pts
1	Atlético Jiennense	8	7	1	0	38	5	+33	22
2	Ciudad de Torredonjimeno	8	4	3	1	13	7	+6	15
3	EMD Villacarrillo	8	4	2	2	19	9	+10	14
4	CD Linares CF 2011	8	1	0	7	5	23	−18	3
5	Veteranos Alcaudete	8	1	0	7	1	32	−31	3

Top scorer: Jessica Agea (Atlético Jiennense), 7 goals

=== Málaga ===
Pos	Team	Pld	W	D	L	GF	GA	GD	Pts
1	CD Benalmadena	24	19	4	1	60	14	+46	61
2	El Palo CD	24	17	3	4	64	21	+43	54
3	AD Pablo Picasso	24	16	3	5	80	31	+49	51
4	Mortadelo UD	24	15	5	4	80	34	+46	50
5	CD Rincón	24	13	5	6	75	28	+47	44
6	CD Puerto de la Torre	24	11	6	7	56	32	+24	39
7	FB Torreño	24	12	1	11	72	45	+27	37
8	Juventud Fuengirola	24	11	3	10	73	52	+21	36
9	Atlético Estación	24	7	3	14	46	63	−17	24
10	CD Mijas	24	6	4	14	31	47	−16	22
11	Antequera CF	24	4	4	16	27	82	−55	16
12	Candor CF	24	3	3	18	34	73	−39	12
13	Nerja CD	24	0	0	24	15	191	−176	0

Top scorer: Cristina Moneo (FB Torreño), 24 goals

=== Promotion ===
Quarterfinals
1	Sporting de Huelva "B"	0	0	0 (p)
8	Estudiantes de Sevilla	0	0	0
4	CD Benalmadena	1	2	3
5	Atlético Jiennense	4	6	10
2	Arenas de Armilla
7
3	El Puerto UP	0	0	0
6	CD Pozoalbense	3	0	3

Semifinals
Sporting de Huelva "B"	2	1	3
Atlético Jiennense	1	0	1
Arenas de Armilla	5	1	6
CD Pozoalbense	0	3	3

Promotion
Sporting de Huelva "B"
Arenas de Armilla

Tor scorer: Diana González (Sporting de Huelva): 4 goals

== Extremadura ==
The top team will promoted to 2015–16 Segunda División (women).

Group 1:

Pos	Team	Pld	W	D	L	GF	GA	GD	Pts
1	CFF Cáceres Atlético	14	13	0	1	65	14	+51	39
2	CD Ciconia Negra	14	11	0	3	49	20	+29	33
3	AD La Bellota Deportiva	14	9	1	4	50	20	+30	28
4	CP Moraleja Cahersa	14	9	1	4	57	18	+39	28
5	CF Trujillo	14	4	2	8	32	54	−22	14
6	CD Ruecas	14	3	2	9	21	55	−34	11
7	Don Benito Balompié	14	3	1	10	19	65	−46	10
8	CD Ciconia Negra "B"	14	0	1	13	8	55	−47	1

=== Top scorers ===
Rank	Player	Club	Goals
1	Marta Herrero	La Bellota Deportiva	20
2	Mª Sol Schez. Bacaioca	CFF Cáceres Atlético	14
3	Ángela Merchán	CD Ciconia Negra	13
4	María Ferreira	CP Moraleja Cahersa	12
5	Paula León	CFF Cáceres Atlético	11

Group 2:

Pos	Team	Pld	W	D	L	GF	GA	GD	Pts
1	Juventud UVA	16	14	1	1	60	18	+42	43
2	EF Peña El Valle	16	12	0	4	52	30	+22	36
3	CFF Badajoz & Olivenza "B"	16	10	3	3	59	26	+33	33
4	Santa Teresa CD "B"	16	10	2	4	43	26	+17	32
5	Extremadura FCF "B"	16	6	2	8	29	29	0	20
6	AD Llerenense	16	4	1	11	23	58	−35	13
7	AD Mérida Femenino	16	4	1	11	33	51	−18	13
8	CD Quintana	16	4	0	12	23	63	−40	12
9	Amantea CFF	16	2	2	12	18	39	−21	8

=== Top scorers ===
Rank	Player	Club	Goals
1	Sheila Fdez. Bautista	EF Peña El Valle	26
2	Mª Coral Ramírez	Juventud UVA	17
3	Carla Bautista	Santa Teresa CD "B"	11
4	Celia Castillo	CFF Badajoz & Olivenza "B	10
5	Alicia Jaén	CFF Badajoz & Olivenza "B	9

=== Promotion ===
Quarterfinals
1	AD La Bellota Deportiva	3	1	4
8	EF Peña El Valle	4	3	7
4	Santa Teresa CD "B"	0	0	0
5	CFF Cáceres Atlético	1	2	3
2	CFF Badajoz & Olivenza "B"	4	1	5
7	CD Ciconia Negra	2	3	5
3	CP Moraleja Cahersa	2	0	2
6	Juventud UVA	3	2	5

Semifinals
EF Peña El Valle	3	5	8
CFF Cáceres Atlético	2	1	3
CD Ciconia Negra	4	2	6
Juventud UVA	0	1	1

Promotion
EF Peña El Valle
CD Ciconia Negra

Top scorer: Sheila Fdez. Bautista (EF Peña El Valle): 4 goals

== Castilla-La Mancha ==
The top team will promoted to 2015–16 Segunda División (women).

Pos	Team	Pld	W	D	L	GF	GA	GD	Pts
1	CDE Al-Basit	30	23	5	2	85	19	+66	74
2	CD Guadamur Femenino	30	21	5	4	83	28	+55	68
3	CD Miguelturreño	30	20	6	4	87	29	+58	66
4	EFD Quintanar del Rey	30	19	5	6	74	31	+43	62
5	CDE Pozo de las Nieves	30	17	6	7	56	26	+30	57
6	Fundación Albacete "B"	30	16	4	10	58	41	+17	52
7	CD Bargas	30	15	6	9	71	38	+33	51
8	EMF Fuensalida	30	12	9	9	74	63	+11	45
9	CDF Talavera	30	11	7	12	40	42	−2	40
10	CD Amistades Guadalajara	30	11	7	12	68	51	+17	40
11	CFF Albacete "B"	30	7	5	18	29	77	−48	26
12	Dínamo Guadalajara "B"	30	8	2	20	29	54	−25	26
13	FF La Solana "B"	30	7	4	19	25	84	−59	25
14	CD Ciudad Real	30	6	4	20	34	69	−35	22
15	Fundación Guadalajara	30	4	4	22	30	102	−72	16
16	Atlético Tomelloso	30	2	3	25	19	108	−89	9

=== Top scorers ===
Rank	Player	Club	Goals
1	Elena Ruiz Aguado	CD Bargas	36
2	Lorena Carrasco	CDE Al-Basit	33
3	Carla Bautista	Fundación Albacete	27
4	Jessica Huete	CD Miguelturreño	26
5	Rosa Otermin	EMF Fuensalida	21
6	Melody Díaz	Amistades Guadalajara	17
6	Elena Valiente	CD Guadamur	17
8	Elena Martín Escribano	CD Guadamur	16
9	Jessica Mishel Ruiz	Fundación Guadalajara	15
9	Elena Rguez. Glez.	EMF Fuensalida	15

== Comunidad de Madrid ==
The top team will promoted to 2015–16 Segunda División (women).

Pos	Team	Pld	W	D	L	GF	GA	GD	Pts
1	Atlético Madrid Féminas "C"	32	27	2	3	96	19	+77	83
2	CFF Sur-Getafe	32	24	3	5	88	33	+55	75
3	Olímpico de Moratalaz	32	21	6	5	90	38	+52	69
4	Madrid CFF "B"	32	25	3	4	106	34	+72	78
5	Vallecas CF	32	17	8	7	79	38	+41	59
6	CD Móstoles	32	20	4	8	80	50	+30	64
7	EFF Alcobendas	32	13	9	10	57	49	+8	48
8	UD Tres Cantos "B"	32	12	7	13	72	71	+1	43
9	Las Rozas CF	32	10	9	13	50	59	−9	39
10	Spartac de Manoteras	32	13	5	14	54	67	−13	44
11	Atlético Torrejón de Ardoz	32	10	1	21	48	108	−60	31
12	CD Seseña FB	32	9	5	18	47	66	−19	32
13	Racing Parla CD	32	7	6	19	46	77	−31	27
14	CF Pozuelo de Alarcón "B"	32	11	5	16	51	60	−9	38
15	CF Inter de Valdemoro	32	7	3	22	40	78	−38	24
16	CDAV San Nicasio	32	2	5	25	27	98	−71	11
17	CD Avance	32	1	5	26	22	108	−86	8

=== Top scorers ===
Rank	Player	Club	Goals
1	Mª José Medina	Atlético Madrid "B"	36
2	Ángeles Del Alamo	Vallecas CF	28
3	Mónica Rguez. Casau	CFF Sur-Getafe	26
4	Alba Mª Díaz	Olímpico de Moratalaz	25
5	Lorena Navarro	Madrid CFF "B"	23
6	Elisa Estrada	Spartac de Manoteras	21
6	Isabel Garrote	CD Seseña	19
8	María Rojas	CD Móstoles	17
9	Rocía Acedo	CFF Sur-Getafe	15
9	Rocío Chueca	Atco. Torrejón de Ardoz	15
9	Mar Prieto	Madrid CFF "B"	15

== Ceuta ==
Pos	Team	Pld	W	D	L	GF	GA	GD	Pts
1	CB Camoens Ceuta	10	9	1	0	43	2	+41	28
2	UD Carmelitas	10	8	1	1	36	2	+34	25
3	Rayo de Ceuta	10	6	0	4	31	13	+18	18
4	CD Polillas	10	4	0	6	20	17	+3	12
5	IES Luis de Camoens	10	2	0	8	20	16	+4	6
6	CD Colegio San Daniel	9	0	0	9	0	100	−100	0

== See also ==
Ligas Regionales (Spanish women's football)
