= Royal Football Federation of the Principality of Asturias =

RFEF
- Founded: 1915
- President: José Ramón Cuetos Lobo
- Website: www.asturfutbol.es

The Royal Football Federation of the Principality of Asturias (Spanish: Real Federación de Fútbol del Principado de Asturias; RFFPA) is the federation responsible for managing association football in the Principality of Asturias. Its current president is José Ramón Cuetos Lobo.

RFFPA manages Asturian leagues from Tercera Federación (Group 2) to the Regional lower divisions, the Regional stage of the Copa Federación and the Autonomous team, which plays in the UEFA Regions' Cup.

== History ==
The current RFFPA started in 1913 with the creation of the first autonomous federation. It consisted of six teams and has been chaired by several presidents.

On 21 December, in that same year, the RFFPA received the official backing of the Spanish Football Federation, authorizing the use by the newly created body Cantabrian Federation of Football Club. On 22 November 1916, the Spanish Federation decided that Santander resign from the Northern Federation and be integrated into the Cantabrian Federation, until 1918 when it returned to its former Federation, with 28 May of that year being when the Assembly National Federation agreed to change the name of the Cantabrian Federation of Asturian Regional Federation of Football Clubs.

On 30 June 1919 due to the reform of its Constitution and Bylaws, the RFFPA expands its sports district to join the federation the provinces of León, Palencia and later those of Zamora and Burgos. It changed its name on 6 August 1933 to the Asturian Federation Cup, and in May 1941 to underwent a new transformation to become Astur-Montañesa Federation Cup, which governed the sport in good order the provinces of Asturias, León, Palencia, Santander, Burgos, Zamora and Salamanca, until at last, in 1952, the RFFPA was restored to the Asturian Federation denomination with only the province of Asturias.

In 1985, under Decree 71/1985 of the Concierge of Education, Culture and Sport, RFFPA becomes the current Football Federation of Asturias. This was the most important date in recent years because it allowed the acquisition of legal personality to enable a territorial assembly legislation, which since 1986 has stipulated that its own Rules and Regulations, whose obvious advantages are reflected in the processes arising from natural or legal persons who depend on our territorial federative organization, the ETF, solely and exclusively on those competitions in excess of the Asturias principality territory.

The average weekly meetings are 500, which in quantity are very difficult to overcome in terms of the population of the region. Appearing in recent years are new forms of soccer like futbol 7 and women's soccer, as well as the specialty of indoor football, which have gained important steps to become fully integrated into the organization and the federal competition entity with the power and sufficient conditions equal to the rest of the members.

The organization's coaching and officiating structure includes the School Committee of Referees, Coaches and School Committee, and the indoor football Referees Technical Committee, which all operate within the organization's Regulations. These committees work directly with the Federation itself, conducting regular courses and certifications for both coaches and referees.

Since April 1977 HRH Felipe de Borbón, Prince of Asturias, holds the honorary presidency of the Football Federation of Asturias.

== Competitions ==
The Royal Asturias Football Federation organises the following competitions:

- Tercera Federación, group 2
- Divisiones Regionales de Fútbol in Asturias
- Women's regional league
- Copa Federación de España (Asturias tournament)

== Champions ==
=== Tercera División-Tercera División RFEF/Tercera Federación ===
In bold, champions and runners-up that promoted to Segunda División B.

Season	Champion	Runner-up	Other promoted teams
1990–91	Caudal	Hispano	Mosconia
1991–92	Lealtad	Caudal	
1992–93	Caudal	Lealtad	Langreo
1993–94	Caudal	Siero	
1994–95	Caudal	Siero	
1995–96	Titánico	**Oviedo B**	Marino Luanco
1996–97	Siero	Navia	Caudal
1997–98	**Lealtad**	Universidad Oviedo	
1998–99	Marino Luanco	Siero	
1999–00	Lealtad	**Siero**	Universidad Oviedo
2000–01	**Marino Luanco**	Oviedo B	
2001–02	**Langreo**	Avilés	Ribadesella
2002–03	**Caudal**	Titánico	
2003–04	Oviedo	Oviedo ACF	Marino Luanco
2004–05	**Oviedo**	Ribadesella	
2005–06	**Universidad Oviedo**	Langreo	
2006–07	Caudal	Lealtad	
2007–08	Oviedo	**Sporting Gijón B**	
2008–09	**Oviedo**	Universidad Oviedo	
2009–10	**Caudal**	Marino Luanco	
2010–11	Marino Luanco	Universidad Oviedo	
2011–12	**Caudal**	Avilés (Note: Later promoted after buying a vacant place.)	
2012–13	Tuilla	Universidad Oviedo	
2013–14	**Lealtad**	**Langreo**	
2014–15	Condal	Caudal	
2015–16	**Caudal**	Langreo	
2016–17	**Sporting Gijón B**	Avilés	
2017–18	**Oviedo B**	**Langreo**	
2018–19	Lealtad	**Marino Luanco**	
2019–20	**Lealtad**	Llanera	Covadonga
2020–21	**Ceares**	**Llanera**	Avilés
2021–22	**Oviedo Vetusta**	Sporting Gijón B	
2022–23	**Covadonga**	Sporting Gijón B	
2023–24	**Llanera**	Sporting Atlético	
2024–25	**Oviedo Vetusta**	Caudal	**Lealtad**
2025–26	**Llanera**	Covadonga	

== Notable clubs affiliated with RFFPA ==
Segunda División

- Oviedo
- Sporting Gijón

Primera Federación

- Real Avilés Industrial CF

Segunda Federación

- UD Llanera
- Marino de Luanco
- Real Oviedo Vetusta

Segunda Federación (women)

- Oviedo
- Sporting Gijón

== Presidents ==
Presidente
Fernando Fernández Quirós
Enrique Guisasola
Víctor Felgueroso
Luis Fernández Reguero
Andrés Avelino Blanco
Julián Ayesta
Vicente Roque Piñole
Fernando Arroyo
Luis Blanc
Ceferino San Martín
Francisco Alonso León
Claudio Martín
Elías Lucio de Tapia
Celso García Gutiérrez
Guillermo Menéndez Coto
Manuel Vega-Arango
Maximino Martínez Suárez
José Ramón Cuetos Lobo

== International referees from the RFFPA ==
- Mariano Medina Iglesias
- Manuel Díaz Vega
- Manuel Mejuto González
- César Muñiz Fernández
