= 2018–19 Segunda División (women) =

Segunda División
- Season: 2018–19
- Promoted: Deportivo La Coruña; Tacón

The 2018–19 Segunda División Femenina de Fútbol was the 18th edition of the Spanish women's football second-tier league.

== Competition format ==
The Segunda División was divided into seven inter-regional groups. Each group played their season as home and away round-robin format. The seven group champions (for group 6, the winner of the Canarian final) and the best runner-up qualified for the promotion playoffs.

In the promotion playoffs, the eight teams were divided by draw into two groups of four teams that played a double-leg knockout format. The two winners promoted to the Primera División.

Depending on how the format change is perceived, the top four teams of each group and the two best fifth qualified teams remain in/are promoted to the 2019–20 Segunda División Pro, together with the two relegated teams from Primera División, giving a total of 32 teams to be divided into two groups. All others (depending on the perception) remain in/are relegated to the 2019–20 Primera Nacional which becomes the third tier, retaining its setup of 7 groups of 14 teams.

== Group 1 ==
Pos	Team	Pld	W	D	L	GF	GA	GD	Pts	Promotion or qualification
1	Deportivo La Coruña	26	25	1	0	150	13	+137	76	Qualification to promotion playoffs
2	Oviedo	26	21	3	2	106	25	+81	66	Promotion to Segunda División Pro
3	Peluquería Mixta Friol	26	15	8	3	76	29	+47	53	Promotion to Segunda División Pro
4	Racing Santander	26	16	3	7	87	31	+56	51	Promotion to Segunda División Pro
5	Atlántida Matamá (Note: Atlántida Matamá resigned to promotion. Sporting Gijón achieved its place as next qualified Team of the group.)	26	14	5	7	60	42	+18	47	
6	Sporting Gijón (Note: NNN)	26	13	4	9	67	47	+20	43	Promotion to Segunda División Pro
7	Victoria CF	26	12	2	12	41	47	−6	38	
8	Victoria FC	26	10	5	11	33	48	−15	35	
9	Monte	26	8	8	10	41	52	−11	32	
10	Valladares	26	5	8	13	29	66	−37	23	
11	Gijón	26	5	4	17	27	85	−58	19	
12	Sárdoma	26	4	3	19	32	86	−54	15	
13	Atlético Arousana	26	2	3	21	28	124	−96	9	
14	Oceja	26	2	3	21	26	108	−82	9	

Source: Futbolme.com
Rules for classification: 1) points; 2) head-to-head points; 3) head-to-head goal difference; 4) goal difference; 5) number of goals scored.

== Group 2 ==
Pos	Team	Pld	W	D	L	GF	GA	GD	Pts	Promotion or qualification
1	Osasuna	26	22	2	2	84	18	+66	68	Qualification to promotion playoffs
2	Alavés	26	21	4	1	84	16	+68	67	Promotion to Segunda División Pro
3	Eibar	26	21	2	3	82	25	+57	65	Promotion to Segunda División Pro
4	Athletic Bilbao B	26	19	4	3	82	19	+63	61	Promotion to Segunda División Pro
5	Añorga	26	12	3	11	47	42	+5	39	
6	San Ignacio	26	12	2	12	41	47	−6	38	
7	Bizkerre	26	9	5	12	38	48	−10	32	
8	Pradejón	26	9	4	13	36	58	−22	31	
9	Aurrerá Vitoria	26	9	2	15	44	59	−15	29	
10	Oliver	26	8	2	16	35	60	−25	26	
11	Berriozar	26	7	3	16	33	64	−31	24	
12	Mulier	26	6	4	16	22	59	−37	22	
13	Oiartzun	26	4	5	17	34	66	−32	17	
14	Atlético Revellín	26	2	0	24	20	101	−81	6	

Source: Futbolme.com
Rules for classification: 1) points; 2) head-to-head points; 3) head-to-head goal difference; 4) goal difference; 5) number of goals scored.

== Group 3 ==
Pos	Team	Pld	W	D	L	GF	GA	GD	Pts	Promotion or qualification
1	Zaragoza CFF	26	21	3	2	54	13	+41	66	Qualification to promotion playoffs
2	Seagull	26	20	3	3	55	15	+40	63	Promotion to Segunda División Pro
3	Barcelona B	26	16	5	5	72	26	+46	53	Promotion to Segunda División Pro
4	AEM	26	15	3	8	55	33	+22	48	Promotion to Segunda División Pro
5	Collerense (Note: MMM)	26	15	3	8	56	32	+24	48	Promotion to Segunda División Pro
6	Espanyol B	26	13	5	8	61	37	+24	44	
7	Sant Gabriel	26	12	4	10	50	32	+18	40	
8	Pardinyes (Note: Match Pardinyes–Collerense was awarded to the visitor team by 0–3. It initially ended 3–2.)	26	9	7	10	36	40	−4	34	
9	Europa	26	10	1	15	39	50	−11	31	
10	Igualada	26	9	3	14	29	39	−10	30	
11	Son Sardina	26	8	3	15	21	53	−32	27	
12	Sant Pere Pescador	26	7	1	18	38	69	−31	22	
13	Pallejà	26	4	1	21	21	57	−36	13	
14	Mallorca Toppfotball	26	2	0	24	12	103	−91	6	

Source: Futbolme.com
Rules for classification: 1) points; 2) head-to-head points; 3) head-to-head goal difference; 4) goal difference; 5) number of goals scored.

== Group 4 ==
Pos	Team	Pld	W	D	L	GF	GA	GD	Pts	Promotion or qualification
1	Santa Teresa	26	23	3	0	100	8	+92	72	Qualification to promotion playoffs
2	Granada	26	23	2	1	129	4	+125	71	Promotion to Segunda División Pro
3	Cáceres (Note: Match Cáceres–Híspalis was awarded to the home team by 3–0. It initially ended 0–0.)	26	17	5	4	66	24	+42	56	Promotion to Segunda División Pro
4	Córdoba	26	16	7	3	71	26	+45	55	Promotion to Segunda División Pro
5	Pozoalbense	26	13	5	8	65	45	+20	44	Promotion to Segunda División Pro
6	Málaga B	26	13	4	9	64	33	+31	43	
7	Sporting Huelva B	26	13	4	9	65	35	+30	43	
8	Extremadura	26	11	3	12	46	47	−1	36	
9	Híspalis (Note: EEE)	26	9	2	15	35	61	−26	29	
10	La Rambla	26	6	5	15	34	77	−43	23	
11	San Miguel	26	3	8	15	24	64	−40	17	
12	Castuera	26	4	5	17	23	69	−46	17	
13	Luis de Camoens	26	2	2	22	16	114	−98	8	
14	Peña El Valle	26	1	1	24	7	138	−131	4	

Source: Futbolme.com
Rules for classification: 1) points; 2) head-to-head points; 3) head-to-head goal difference; 4) goal difference; 5) number of goals scored.

== Group 5 ==
Pos	Team	Pld	W	D	L	GF	GA	GD	Pts	Promotion or qualification
1	Tacón	26	22	4	0	74	4	+70	70	Qualification to promotion playoffs
2	Parquesol	26	18	2	6	56	26	+30	56	Promotion to Segunda División Pro
3	Atlético Madrid B	26	17	4	5	69	27	+42	55	Promotion to Segunda División Pro
4	Pozuelo de Alarcón	26	15	4	7	51	18	+33	49	Promotion to Segunda División Pro
5	Madrid CFF B	26	14	5	7	59	25	+34	47	Promotion to Segunda División Pro
6	Alhóndiga	26	13	4	9	39	34	+5	43	
7	Rayo Vallecano B	26	13	3	10	37	33	+4	42	
8	Torrelodones	26	10	9	7	31	31	0	39	
9	Dinamo Guadalajara	26	11	4	11	38	35	+3	37	
10	La Solana	26	8	1	17	37	51	−14	25	
11	Olímpico Madrid	26	5	8	13	40	56	−16	23	
12	Salamanca FF	26	6	2	18	29	63	−34	20	
13	Olímpico León	26	5	0	21	29	79	−50	15	
14	Nuestra Señora de Belén	26	0	0	26	10	117	−107	0	

Source: Futbolme.com
Rules for classification: 1) points; 2) head-to-head points; 3) head-to-head goal difference; 4) goal difference; 5) number of goals scored.

== Group 6 ==
=== Las Palmas Group ===
Pos	Team	Pld	W	D	L	GF	GA	GD	Pts	Promotion, qualification or relegation
1	Femarguín (Note: Match Juan Grande–Femarguín was conceded to the home team by 3–0 due to illegal alignment. It initially ended 1–4.)	26	24	0	2	267	9	+258	72	Qualification to the Canarian final
2	Juan Grande (Note: HHH)	26	24	0	2	267	11	+256	72	Qualification to promotion playoffs
3	Unión Viera	26	24	0	2	166	21	+145	72	Promotion to Segunda División Pro
4	Las Majoreras-Guayadeque	26	17	2	7	76	35	+41	53	
5	Las Torres	26	15	1	10	70	50	+20	46	
6	La Garita	26	13	3	10	79	64	+15	42	
7	Achamán	26	11	5	10	59	58	+1	38	
8	Montaña Alta	26	12	2	12	60	62	−2	38	
9	Cardones (R)	26	12	2	12	70	63	+7	38	Relegation to Interinsular leagues
10	Iregui (R)	26	8	4	14	43	68	−25	28	Relegation to Interinsular leagues
11	Firgas (R)	26	5	2	19	41	110	−69	17	Relegation to Interinsular leagues
12	Yoñé (R)	26	3	1	22	20	169	−149	10	Relegation to Interinsular leagues
13	Aguiluchas (R)	26	3	0	23	16	219	−203	9	Relegation to Interinsular leagues
14	Vallinámar (R)	26	0	0	26	6	310	−304	0	Relegation to Interinsular leagues

Source: Futbolme.com
Rules for classification: 1) points; 2) head-to-head points; 3) head-to-head goal difference; 4) goal difference; 5) number of goals scored.
(R) Relegated

=== Tenerife Group ===
Pos	Team	Pld	W	D	L	GF	GA	GD	Pts	Promotion, qualification or relegation
1	Granadilla B	26	26	0	0	184	4	+180	78	Promotion to Segunda División Pro
2	Tacuense	26	24	0	2	142	11	+131	72	Qualification to the Canarian final
3	Atlético Unión de Güímar	26	19	2	5	94	21	+73	59	Promotion to Segunda División Pro
4	Llano del Moro	26	18	1	7	117	36	+81	55	
5	Furia Arona	26	17	2	7	103	30	+73	53	
6	San Antonio Pilar	26	13	1	12	92	66	+26	40	
7	Tarsa	26	11	6	9	62	46	+16	39	
8	Sanse	26	11	3	12	65	72	−7	36	
9	Geneto del Teide (R)	26	7	6	13	42	54	−12	27	Relegation to Interinsular leagues
10	Casablanca (R)	26	7	5	14	50	89	−39	26	Relegation to Interinsular leagues
11	Orotava (R)	26	4	2	20	45	73	−28	14	Relegation to Interinsular leagues
12	San Lorenzo (R)	26	3	2	21	31	101	−70	11	Relegation to Interinsular leagues
13	Padre Anchieta (R)	26	0	0	26	5	391	−386	0	Relegation to Interinsular leagues
14	Añaza (Note: Disqualified after not presenting to two consecutive games.) (D, R)	26	5	4	17	40	78	−38	0	Relegation to Interinsular leagues

Source: Futbolme.com
Rules for classification: 1) points; 2) head-to-head points; 3) head-to-head goal difference; 4) goal difference; 5) number of goals scored.
(D) Disqualified; (R) Relegated

=== Canarian final ===
The winner of the Canarian final qualified to the promotion stage. After the refusal of Granadilla B, Tacuense was allowed to play the playoff.

Team 1	Agg.	Team 2	1st leg	2nd leg
Tacuense	2–8	Femarguín	1–5	1–3

=== Promotion playoff ===
Team 1	Agg.	Team 2	1st leg	2nd leg
Atlético Unión de Güímar	2–3	Unión Viera	0–0	2–3

== Group 7 ==
Pos	Team	Pld	W	D	L	GF	GA	GD	Pts	Promotion or qualification
1	Valencia B	26	20	3	3	83	22	+61	63	Promotion to Segunda División Pro
2	Alhama	26	19	4	3	74	25	+49	61	Qualification to promotion playoffs
3	Villarreal	26	18	4	4	51	23	+28	58	Promotion to Segunda División Pro
4	Levante B	26	17	3	6	56	35	+21	54	Promotion to Segunda División Pro
5	Mislata	26	12	7	7	49	32	+17	43	
6	Sporting Plaza de Argel	26	10	10	6	53	26	+27	40	
7	Lorca FAD	26	12	3	11	41	40	+1	39	
8	Aldaia	26	11	5	10	34	29	+5	38	
9	Joventut Almassora	26	11	5	10	48	51	−3	38	
10	Elche	26	8	7	11	38	46	−8	31	
11	Marítim	26	5	6	15	27	50	−23	21	
12	Fundación Albacete B	26	4	1	21	24	58	−34	13	
13	Discóbolo-La Torre	26	3	3	20	19	66	−47	12	
14	Ciudad de Murcia	26	1	1	24	18	112	−94	4	

Source: Futbolme.com
Rules for classification: 1) points; 2) head-to-head points; 3) head-to-head goal difference; 4) goal difference; 5) number of goals scored.

== Ranking of second-placed teams ==
Pos	Grp	Team	Pld	W	D	L	GF	GA	GD	Pts	Qualification
1	6	Juan Grande	26	24	0	2	267	11	+256	72	Qualification to promotion playoffs
2	4	Granada	26	23	2	1	129	4	+125	71	
3	2	Alavés	26	21	4	1	84	16	+68	67	
4	1	Oviedo	26	21	3	2	106	25	+81	66	
5	3	Seagull	26	20	3	3	55	15	+40	63	
6	7	Villarreal	26	18	4	4	51	23	+28	58	
7	5	Parquesol	26	18	2	6	56	26	+30	56	

Rules for classification: 1) Points; 2) Goal difference; 3) Goals scored.

== Ranking of fifth-placed teams ==
Pos	Grp	Team	Pld	W	D	L	GF	GA	GD	Pts	Promotion
1	3	Collerense	26	15	3	8	56	32	+24	48	Promotion to Segunda División Pro
2	5	Madrid CFF B	26	14	5	7	59	25	+34	47	Promotion to Segunda División Pro
3	1	Atlántida Matamá	26	14	5	7	60	42	+18	47	Promotion to Segunda División Pro
4	4	Pozoalbense	26	13	5	8	65	45	+20	44	Promotion to Segunda División Pro
5	7	Mislata	26	12	7	7	49	32	+17	43	
6	2	Añorga	26	12	3	11	47	42	+5	39	

Rules for classification: 1) Points; 2) Goal difference; 3) Goals scored.

== Promotion playoffs ==
The bracket was drawn on 23 April 2019.

Semi-finals
28 April and 5 May
Santa Teresa (a)	1	1	2
Osasuna	0	2	2
28 April and 5 May
Tacón	1	1	2
Zaragoza CFF	1	0	1

Final
12 and 18–19 May
Santa Teresa	1	0	1
Tacón	0	2	2

Semi-finals
28 April and 5 May
Alhama	0	1	1
Deportivo La Coruña	1	5	6
28 April and 5 May
Femarguín	2	1	3
Juan Grande	0	2	2

Final
12 and 18–19 May
Deportivo La Coruña	2	4	6
Femarguín	0	1	1
