= CA Osasuna Femenino =

Spanish women's football team

Osasuna Femenino
- Full name: Club Atlético Osasuna Femenino
- Nicknames: Gorritxoak los Rojillas (the Reds)
- Founded: 2016; 10 years ago
- Stadium: Tajonar Facilities
- President: Luis Sabalza
- Head coach: Roberto Pérez Rivera
- League: Primera Federación
- 2025–26: Primera Federación, 7th
- Website: https://www.osasuna.es/
| Home colours | Away colours | Third colours |

Club Atlético Osasuna Femenino is a Spanish women's football team from Pamplona, Navarre, currently playing in the Primera Federación. It is the women's section of CA Osasuna.

== History ==
=== First incarnation / Mulier-Osasuna ===
From 2003, Osasuna's women's team played in Groups 1 and 2 of the Segunda División for seven seasons, usually finishing mid-table. Marta Unzué, who would later win several titles with Barcelona, began her career at the club. In the early 2010s, some controversies arose over the organization's management of the team: in March 2011, eleven players left the team accusing the executives of sexism, lack of interest and poor training conditions, and in May of the following year, outgoing chairman Patxi Izco declared women's football as "unsightly" and "unsuitable for women".

The team was disbanded in June 2014 in the midst of financial turmoil, weeks after the men's team were relegated to the Segunda División; their most promising player Maite Oroz moved to Athletic Bilbao on a free transfer. However, within weeks an agreement was secured with fledgling club Mulier FCN (based in nearby Mutilva Baja, Aranguren) to collaborate on the formation of a senior team in the Navarre Regional League (third tier) for the following season, with this squad playing at Osasuna's Tajonar Facilities and Mulier operating its own club structure and youth teams.

The Mulier-Osasuna team won promotion at the first attempt, winning 26 of their 28 matches. Struggling at the bottom of the table in the subsequent Segunda División campaign, the two clubs thereafter parted ways, with Mulier reprieved to remain in the second tier and Osasuna's team re-launching independently in the level below as the figureheads of a new foundation involving several other local clubs (including SD Lagunak, who for much of the decade prior were one of the elite clubs of Spanish women's football).

=== 2016 relaunch ===
The separate Osasuna Femenino team dominated the Navarre regional league (80 points from a possible 84) and were promoted to join their former partners, along with the women's sections of the Basque clubs Eibar and Alavés. Meanwhile Mulier, who had declined to join the Osasuna group as it would have resulted in their relegation, (they later agreed a partnership with Athletic Bilbao in 2019) initially performed better without the input from Osasuna, finishing runners-up in the Segunda División group.

The first home fixture of 2017–18 was played at El Sadar Stadium, home to the Osasuna men's team, marking the first occasion that the venue hosted a women's match in its 50-year history.

Osasuna was also permitted to add a B-team in the Navarre regional league for 2017–18, as they had previously in the 2011–12 and 2012–13 seasons. At the same time as the first team were promoted to the new Segunda Pro level in 2019, the B team also moved up to the third tier, now called Primera Nacional.

From 2018 until 2020, the telecommunications firm Euskaltel was the main sponsor of the Osasuna Femenino team. Technology company Humanox became the sponsor in 2020.

In the 2020–21 season, played in a two-phase format due to the COVID-19 pandemic in Spain, Osasuna challenged for promotion to the Primera División for the first time, but finished second behind Alavés (who also had never reached the top tier previously) in both the winter and spring regional groups.

Osasuna competed in the Copa de la Reina for the first time in the 2021–22 season after the competition was opened up to clubs outside the top division; however the lost in the first round to PM Friol (Galicia) who had been relegated from the second tier at the end of the previous campaign. In 2022–23 season they progressed through three early rounds then lost 9–0 to the almost-unbeatable Barcelona, only to be reinstated due to the opposition having used an ineligible player. In the quarter-finals they were narrowly defeated at Tajonar by Athletic Bilbao, who later signed three players from the Osasuna line-up. In the three subsequent seasons, the team lost in the third round each time.

Their league fortunes in that period also followed a familiar pattern: the second tier was reduced to a single group for the 2022–23 season and Osasuna reached the promotion playoffs after finishing fourth, but lost in the semi-finals. The next year they were fourth again, made it to the playoff final and led Espanyol 1–0 after the home first leg (played at El Sadar) via a goal from Maite Valero, but lost the return 3–1. In 2024–25 a sixth place was not enough for the playoffs, however seventh place the next year was sufficient due to the presence of reserve teams in the positions above – but another semi-final exit was the outcome.

== Season to season ==
| Season | Division | Place | Copa de la Reina |
|---|---|---|---|
| 2003–04 | Prov. | 2nd | |
| 2004–05 | Prov. | 1st | |
| 2005–06 | 1ª Nac. | 5th | |
| 2006–07 | 1ª Nac. | 12th | |
| 2007–08 | Local | | |
| 2008–09 | Prov. | 1st | |
| 2009–10 | 1ª Nac. | 3rd | |
| 2010–11 | 1ª Nac. | 4th | |
| 2011–12 | 2ª | 6th | |
| 2012–13 | 2ª | 6th | |
| 2013–14 | 2ª | 3rd | |
| 2014–15 | Regional | 1st (Note: as Mulier FCN-CA Osasuna) | |
| 2015–16 | 2ª | 14th | |
| 2016–17 | Regional | 1st | |
| 2017–18 | 2ª | 4th (Note: Placing in one of 7 regionalised groups.) | |
| 2018–19 | 2ª | 1st (Note: Placing in one of 6 regionalised groups.) (Note: Along with the other Segunda División regional winners, the team took part in the playoffs to the Primera División but did not qualify; instead they moved to the new Primera División B but remained in the second tier of the system due to its creation.) | |
| 2019–20 | 2ª Pro | 4th (Note: Placing in one of 2 regionalised groups.) (Note: Season curtailed due to the COVID-19 pandemic in Spain.) | |
| 2020–21 | 2ª Pro | 2nd (Note: In 1 of 4 regionalised Autumn subgroups.)/2nd (Note: in 1 of 2 regionalised 'promotion/retention' Spring subgroups.) | |
| 2021–22 | 2ª Pro | 3rd | First round |
| 2022–23 | 1ª Fed | 4th (Note: Lost in promotion playoffs semi-final.) | Quarter-final |
| 2023–24 | 1ª Fed | 4th (Note: Lost in promotion playoffs final.) | Third round |
| 2024–25 | 1ª Fed | 6th | Third round |
| 2025–26 | 1ª Fed | 7th | Third round |

== Honours ==
=== As Mulier-Osasuna ===
- Navarre Regional League: 2014–15

=== As Osasuna Femenino ===
- Segunda División: 2018–19 (Group 2)
- Navarre Regional League: 2016–17
- Navarre Provincial League: 2004–05, 2008–09

== See also ==
- Category:CA Osasuna Femenino players
