= 2020–21 Segunda División Pro (women) =

Segunda División Pro
- Season: 2020–21
- Promoted: Alavés; Villarreal
- Relegated: Espanyol B Pozuelo de Alarcón; Collerense; Friol; Levante B Aldaia; Málaga; Valencia B

The 2020–21 Segunda División Pro, named Reto Iberdrola for sponsorship reasons, was the 20th season of the second highest league tier of women's football in Spain, and the second season under a new two-group format.

The system was adapted for this year only to two phases (initially split into four small groups on a geographical basis, then into four groups again to decide promotion and relegation) due to the impact of the COVID-19 pandemic in Spain and its related restrictions, which included all matches being played in empty stadiums, and the involvement of two more teams than the usual 32 after relegation was disregarded in the previous edition, while teams still came up from the third tier. No teams were relegated into the division from the previous top level campaign, and the season also began later than usual, on 18 October 2020.

== Participating teams ==
=== North Group ===
Subgroup A		Subgroup B	
Team	City/Town	Team	City/Town
Atlético Madrid B	Madrid	AEM	Lleida
Parquesol	Valladolid	Athletic B	Bilbao
Pozuelo de Alarcón	Pozuelo de Alarcón	Collerense	Palma de Mallorca
Friol	Friol	Alavés	Vitoria-Gasteiz
Madrid CFF B	San Sebastián de los Reyes	Espanyol B	Barcelona
Real Oviedo	Oviedo	Barcelona B	Barcelona
CDE Racing	Santander	Osasuna	Pamplona
Sporting Gijón	Gijón	Seagull	Badalona
		Zaragoza CFF	Zaragoza

=== South Group ===
Subgroup A		Subgroup B	
Team	City/Town	Team	City/Town
Juan Grande	San Bartolomé de Tirajana	Fundación Albacete	Albacete
Cacereño	Cáceres	Alhama	Alhama de Murcia
Córdoba	Córdoba	Joventut Almassora	Almazora
Granada	Granada	Levante B	Valencia
Granadilla B	Granadilla de Abona	RUT Tacuense	Santa Cruz de Tenerife
La Solana	La Solana	Femarguín	Mogán
Málaga	Málaga	Aldaia	Aldaya
CD Pozoalbense	Pozoblanco	Valencia B	Valencia
		Villarreal	Villarreal

== First Phase ==
=== North Group ===
==== Subgroup North A ====
Pos	Team	P	W	D	L	GF	GA	GD	Pts
1	Atlético Madrid B	14	8	4	2	26	14	+12	28
2	Real Oviedo	14	8	3	3	21	12	+9	27
3	Madrid CFF B	14	6	3	5	16	16	0	21
4	CDE Racing	14	5	5	4	24	17	+7	20
5	Sporting Gijón	14	4	6	4	27	25	+2	18
6	Parquesol	14	4	3	7	17	22	-5	15
7	Friol	14	4	2	8	15	27	-12	14
8	Pozuelo de Alarcón	14	3	2	9	12	25	-13	11

Source: FutbolME

Primera División promotion phase
Segunda División survival phase

==== Subgroup North B ====
Pos	Team	P	W	D	L	GF	GA	GD	Pts
1	Alavés	16	12	1	3	34	14	+20	37
2	Osasuna	16	10	4	2	35	18	+17	34
3	Barcelona B	16	7	5	4	30	19	+11	26
4	AEM	16	7	4	5	28	16	+12	25
5	Seagull	16	8	1	7	24	26	-2	25
6	Zaragoza CFF	16	5	7	4	18	15	+3	22
7	Athletic B	16	6	4	6	25	19	+6	22
8	Espanyol B	16	2	1	13	12	52	-40	7
9	Collerense	16	1	1	14	17	44	-27	4

Source: FutbolME

Primera División promotion phase
Segunda División survival phase

=== South Group ===
==== Subgroup A South ====
Pos	Team	P	W	D	L	GF	GA	GD	Pts
1	Pozoalbense	14	10	0	4	23	11	+12	30
2	Granada	14	8	3	3	21	14	+7	27
3	Granadilla B	14	5	5	4	17	14	+3	20
4	Cacereño	14	5	3	6	17	22	-5	18
5	Córdoba	14	5	2	7	15	20	-5	17
6	Málaga	14	4	4	6	22	23	-1	16
7	Juan Grande	14	3	5	6	12	18	-6	14
8	La Solana	14	3	4	7	15	20	-5	13

Source: FutbolME

Primera División promotion phase
Segunda División survival phase

==== Group B South ====
Pos	Team	P	W	D	L	GF	GA	GD	Pts
1	Villarreal	16	13	2	1	38	11	+27	41
2	Fundación Albacete	16	8	6	2	30	16	+14	30
3	Alhama	16	8	3	5	23	15	+8	27
4	RUT Tacuense	16	7	5	4	23	15	+8	26
5	Levante B	16	5	4	7	21	30	-9	19
6	Aldaia	16	4	4	8	21	31	-10	16
7	Joventut Almassora	16	4	3	9	19	29	-10	15
8	Valencia B	16	4	1	11	11	34	-23	13
9	Femarguín	16	2	6	8	14	19	-5	12

Source: FutbolME

Primera División promotion phase
Segunda División survival phase

== Second Phase ==
=== Promotion groups ===
==== Group C North ====
Pos	Team	P	W	D	L	GF	GA	GD	Pts	PPG
1	Alavés	24	18	1	5	50	21	+29	55	2.29
2	Osasuna	24	16	6	2	60	27	+33	54	2.25
3	Real Oviedo	22	12	4	6	34	26	+8	40	1.82
4	Barcelona B	24	12	5	7	47	26	+21	41	1.71
5	AEM	24	11	6	7	38	21	+17	39	1.63
6	Atlético Madrid B	22	8	6	8	30	29	+1	30	1.36
7	CDE Racing	22	8	5	9	29	33	-4	29	1.32
8	Madrid CFF B	22	6	4	12	22	39	-17	22	1.00

Source: FutbolME

Promotion to Primera División

==== Group C South ====
Pos	Team	P	W	D	L	GF	GA	GD	Pts	PPG
1	Villarreal	24	17	4	3	56	19	+37	55	2.29
2	Fundación Albacete	24	14	7	3	49	27	+22	49	2.04
3	Granada	22	12	7	3	37	23	+14	43	1.95
4	Pozoalbense	22	12	1	9	35	29	+6	37	1.68
5	Alhama	24	11	7	6	35	22	+13	40	1.67
6	RUT Tacuense	24	10	6	8	32	27	+5	36	1.50
7	Cáceres	22	7	4	11	24	42	-18	25	1.14
8	Granadilla B	22	5	7	10	20	25	-5	22	1.00

Source: FutbolME

Promotion to Primera División

=== Relegation Groups ===
==== Group D North ====
Pos	Team	P	W	D	L	GF	GA	GD	Pts	PPG
1	Seagull	24	13	4	7	43	34	+9	43	1.79
2	Zaragoza CFF	24	11	8	5	34	23	+11	41	1.71
3	Athletic B	24	11	4	9	41	29	+12	37	1.54
4	Parquesol	24	7	5	12	31	41	-10	26	1.08
5	Sporting Gijón	24	5	10	9	43	48	-5	25	1.04
6	Espanyol B	24	7	3	14	27	60	-33	24	1.00
7	Pozuelo de Alarcón	24	6	3	15	22	42	-20	21	0.88
8	Collerense	24	5	3	16	35	60	-25	18	0.75
9	Friol	24	4	3	17	25	52	-27	15	0.63

Source: FutbolME

Relegation to Primera Nacional

==== Group D South ====
Pos	Team	P	W	D	L	GF	GA	GD	Pts	PPG
1	Juan Grande	24	10	6	8	29	26	+3	36	1.50
2	Córdoba	24	10	6	8	36	34	+2	36	1.50
3	La Solana	24	8	7	9	27	28	-1	31	129
4	Femarguín	24	6	9	9	26	23	+3	27	1.13
5	Joventut Almassora	24	7	6	11	33	42	-9	27	1.13
6	Levante B	24	7	5	12	31	43	-12	26	1.08
7	Aldaia	24	5	7	12	24	38	-14	22	0.92
8	Málaga	24	4	8	12	30	40	-10	20	0.83
9	Valencia B	24	5	3	16	19	55	-36	18	0.75

Source: FutbolME

Relegation to Primera Nacional
