= CDE Racing Féminas =

Spanish women's association football club

Racing Féminas
- Full name: Club Deportivo Elemental Racing Féminas
- Nickname: Verdiblancas
- Founded: 2015 (as Ave Fénix Racing)
- Ground: Campo Santa Ana, Tanos, Torrelavega
- Manager: José Aurelio Crespo
- League: Segunda División Pro
- 2020–21: Segunda División Pro, 7th (North Group B)
Home colours	Away colours

Club Deportivo Elemental Racing Féminas is a Spanish women's association football club based in the autonomous community of Cantabria, currently playing in the Segunda División Pro. They are affiliated to Real Racing Club de Santander, although play their home matches in Torrelavega and have previously been based in Santa Cruz de Bezana.

== History ==
The roots of the club date back to the end of the 20th century when efforts were made to establish women's football in Cantabria where no teams and few players were registered. SD Reocín was established in 2001, and for some years was linked to the professional men's club Real Racing Club de Santander although in reality their involvement was minimal, extending only to the use of kit in exchange for use of the name. 'Reocín Racing' reached the highest level in the Spanish system, the Primera División (then known as the Superliga) in 2010 and were able to maintain their position for a second season before dropping back into the regional Segunda División, joining Group 2 – mostly comprising Basque and Navarrese clubs – as there were not enough Cantabrian clubs to form their own section. When Reocín were relegated further to the regional lower division level in 2015 they were disbanded; however, a new club, Ave Fénix Racing (again loosely associated with Racing Santander) was quickly formed with almost the entire Reocín playing squad, being granted entry to the Segunda Group 1 along with teams from Asturias and Galicia; a reserve team was installed in the Cantabria league in place of that of Reocín.

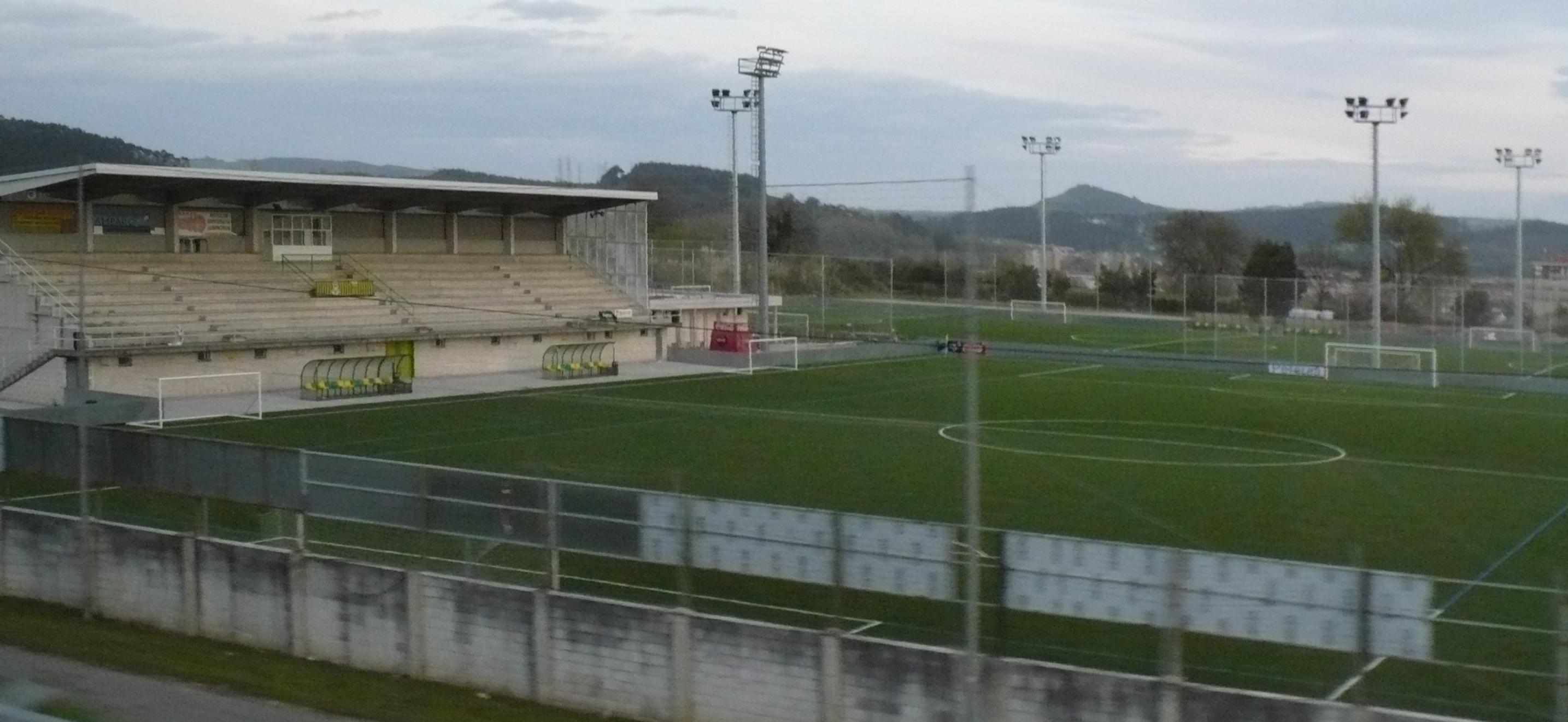
Campo Santa Ana, (Tanos, Torrelavega), home ground of CD Tropezón and used by Racing Féminas for home fixtures in the 2021–22 season.

In 2017 Racing Santander increased its involvement in the women's team, with an introductory event at a home fixture at the Estadio El Sardinero. The Fénix players and coaches migrated to the renamed Racing Féminas, and access was provided to the club's Instalaciones Nando Yosu training ground for some matches (it is therefore a matter of interpretation whether the team was founded in 2015 when Ave Fénix was formed, or 2017 when it was rebranded as Racing Féminas). Some more Cantabrian teams also reached the second tier, most notably CD Monte who became a main rival and finished above Racing in the 2017–18 season – the match between them was played at the Sardinero due to its local significance, with 2,000 spectators in attendance. A fourth place the following year was sufficient for the team to be included in the two-group Segunda División Pro for the 2019–20 season. In October 2019, the president of Racing Santander Alfredo Pérez commented that there were plans to launch a fully integrated women's section but the present Racing Féminas did not have this status, indicating that they were more of a collaborative / partner organisation as Reocín and Fénix had been before.

Racing Féminas competed in the Copa de la Reina for the first time in the 2021–22 season after the competition was opened up to clubs outside the top division; they reached the third round before losing 5–0 at home to the professionals of Athletic Bilbao.

=== Players ===
The career of midfielder Silvia Martínez ('Pinxis') spanning three decades has been closely linked to the development of football locally: her father José Ramón was involved in the foundation of Reocín in 2001 primarily so she and her female friends could enjoy the game as teenagers, having grown too old to be allowed to play with boys. Martínez played for Reocín throughout their existence, including gaining promotion and featuring in the top division, before continuing as captain and figurehead with Ave Fénix then Racing Féminas, as well as being acknowledged for scoring one of the fastest goals in Spanish football in 2017, and taking part in the first match of the Cantabria autonomous football team in 2019.

In 2020, forward Athenea del Castillo, whose departure to Deportivo de La Coruña a year earlier had caused a lengthy dispute between the clubs (Racing demanded a transfer fee but the player was only on an amateur contract and was offered a professional deal by Depor), became the first former player to be selected for the Spain women's national football team. Ligia Moreira (Ecuador), Liucija Vaitukaitytė (Lithuania) and Elexa Bahr (Colombia) were capped for their country as Racing players in the early 2020s.

== Season to season ==
Season	Division	Place	Copa de la Reina
2015–16 (Note: As Ave Fénix Racing)	2ª	6th (Note: Placing in one of 7 regionalised groups.)	
2016–17	2ª	6th	
2017–18	2ª	5th	
2018–19	2ª	1st (Note: Placing in one of 6 regionalised groups.) (Note: Moved to the new Segunda División Pro but remained in the second tier of the system due to its creation.)	
2019–20	2ªP	13th (Note: Placing in one of 2 regionalised groups.) (Note: Season curtailed due to the COVID-19 pandemic in Spain.)	
2020–21	2ªP	4th (Note: In 1 of 4 regionalised Autumn subgroups.)/7th (Note: in 1 of 2 regionalised 'promotion/retention' Spring subgroups.)	

== See also ==
- Category:CDE Racing Féminas players
