= UD Llanera =

Association football club in Spain

Coordinates: 43.444158°N 5.856969°W

Llanera
- Full name: Unión Deportiva Llanera
- Founded: 1981; 45 years ago
- Stadium: Estadio Pepe Quimarán
- Capacity: 1,000
- President: Miguel Ángel López-Cedrón
- Head coach: Chuchi Collado
- League: Segunda Federación – Group 1
- 2025–26: Tercera Federación – Group 2, 1st of 18 (champions)
- Website: http://www.udllanera.es/
Home colours	Away colours

Unión Deportiva Llanera is a Spanish football club based in Posada de Llanera, in the autonomous community of Asturias. Founded in 1981, it plays in Segunda Federación – Group 1, holding home matches at Estadio Pepe Quimarán.

== History ==
The first team called UD Llanera was founded in 1961. This team played in Segunda Regional until the 1969–70, before being disbanded.

In 1981, two former players of the old club convinced Pepe Quimarán, whose name was given to the new stadium of the club, to create a new UD Llanera. In 1987 the club achieved its first promotion ever to Primera Regional.

From 1994 to 1997, the senior team of UD Llanera was disbanded, but the youth teams continued their activity.

In May 2016, after 35 years of playing in regional divisions, the club was promoted for the first time in its history to the Tercera División.

== Season to season ==
Season	Tier	Division	Place	Copa del Rey
1981–82	7	2ª Reg.	14th	
1982–83	7	2ª Reg.	3rd	
1983–84	7	2ª Reg.	15th	
1984–85	7	2ª Reg.	7th	
1985–86	7	2ª Reg.	4th	
1986–87	7	2ª Reg.	1st	
1987–88	6	1ª Reg.	10th	
1988–89	6	1ª Reg.	17th	
1989–90	7	2ª Reg.	1st	
1990–91	6	1ª Reg.	8th	
1991–92	6	1ª Reg.	12th	
1992–93	6	1ª Reg.	15th	
1993–94	6	1ª Reg.	(R)	
1994–1997	DNP			
1997–98	7	2ª Reg.	11th	
1998–99	7	2ª Reg.	10th	
1999–2000	7	2ª Reg.	16th	
2000–01	7	2ª Reg.	3rd	
2001–02	7	2ª Reg.	1st	
2002–03	6	1ª Reg.	15th	

Season	Tier	Division	Place	Copa del Rey
2003–04	7	2ª Reg.	3rd	
2004–05	7	2ª Reg.	12th	
2005–06	7	2ª Reg.	4th	
2006–07	7	2ª Reg.	1st	
2007–08	6	1ª Reg.	11th	
2008–09	6	1ª Reg.	8th	
2009–10	6	1ª Reg.	2nd	
2010–11	5	Reg. Pref.	20th	
2011–12	6	1ª Reg.	13th	
2012–13	6	1ª Reg.	3rd	
2013–14	5	Reg. Pref.	12th	
2014–15	5	Reg. Pref.	8th	
2015–16	5	Reg. Pref.	2nd	
2016–17	4	3ª	13th	
2017–18	4	3ª	15th	
2018–19	4	3ª	5th	
2019–20	4	3ª	2nd	
2020–21	4	3ª	3rd / 2nd	First round
2021–22	4	2ª RFEF	16th	Second round
2022–23	5	3ª Fed.	4th	

Season	Tier	Division	Place	Copa del Rey
2023–24	5	3ª Fed.	1st	
2024–25	4	2ª Fed.	15th	First round
2025–26	5	3ª Fed.	1st	
2026–27	4	2ª Fed.		TBD

- 3 seasons in Segunda Federación/Segunda División RFEF
- 5 seasons in Tercera División
- 3 seasons in Tercera Federación

== Stadium ==
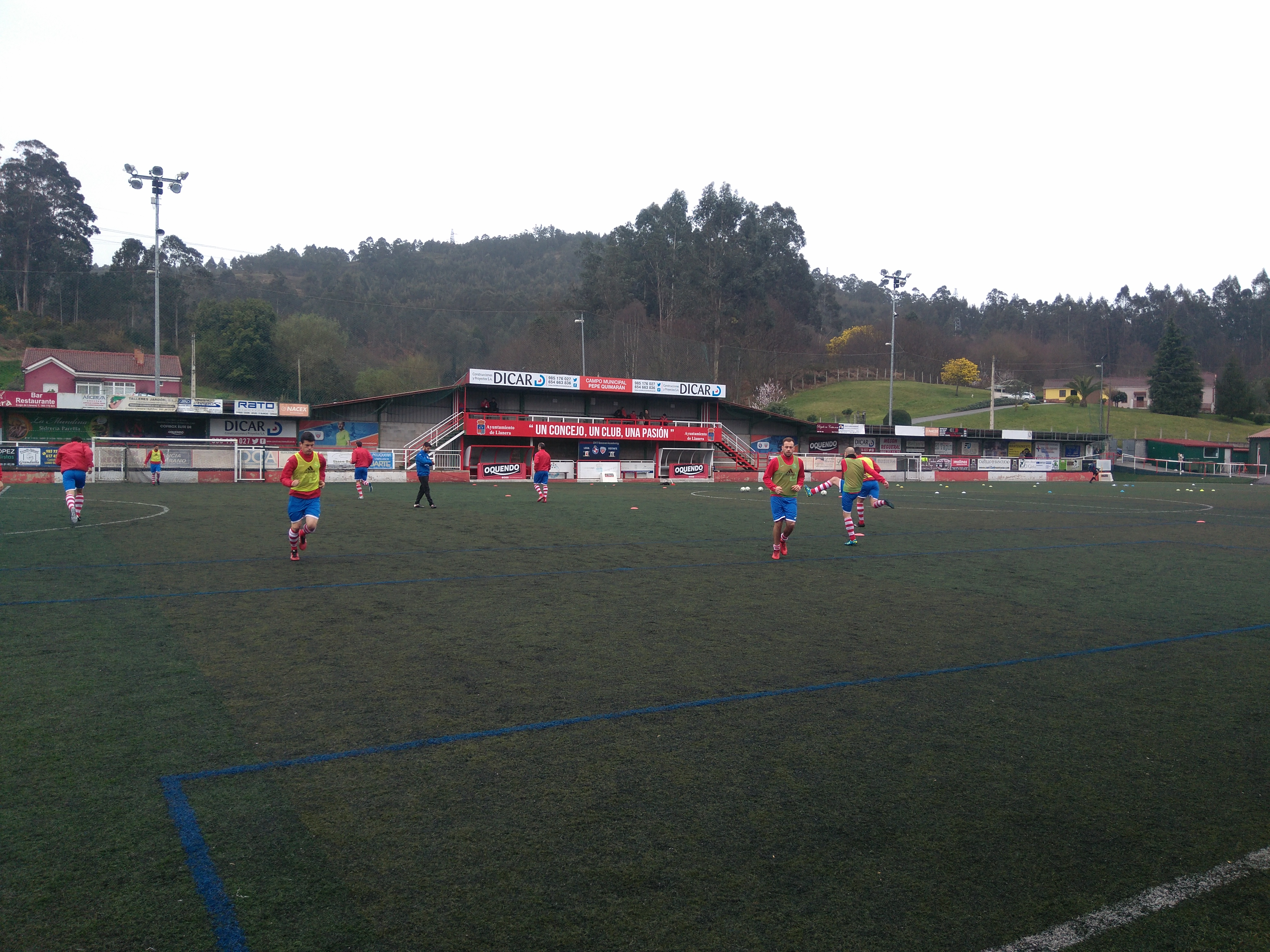
Estadio Pepe Quimarán.

Estadio Las Huelgas was the first home stadium of UD Llanera. It was used until the construction of the new Estadio Pepe Quimarán. The pitch measures 94x48 m and has a capacity for 1,000 people.

== Women's team ==
UD Llanera created a women's football team in 2007. It competed always in the Regional league except in the 2011–12, after an agreement with Oviedo Moderno CF to be its reserve team in Segunda División. In the next season, after its relegation, the agreement was terminated.

Llanera came back to Segunda División in 2017, after finishing as runner-up of the regional league and the ineligibility of Oviedo Moderno B to promote.

=== Season by season ===
Season	Division	Place	Copa de la Reina
2007/08	Regional	3rd	
2008/09	Regional	5th	
2009/10	Regional	3rd	
2010/11	Regional	4th	
2011/12	2ª	14th	
2012/13	Regional	7th	
2013/14	Regional	9th	
2014/15	Regional	6th	
2015/16	Regional	5th	
2016/17	Regional	2nd	
2017/18	2ª	12th	
2018/19	Regional	5th	
2019/20	Regional	2nd	
