= 2017–18 Segunda División (women) =

Segunda División
- Season: 2017–18
- Promoted: Logroño; Málaga
- Biggest home win: Achamán 25–0 Castillo (7 December 2017)
- Biggest away win: Castillo 0–32 Femarguín (5 October 2017)

The 2017–18 Segunda División Femenina de Fútbol was the 2017–18 edition of the Spanish women's football second-tier league.

== Competition format ==
The Segunda División was divided into seven regional groups. Each group played their season as home and away round-robin format. At the end of the season, the lowest three teams from each regional group (except Group 6) were relegated to regional leagues. The seven group champions (for group 6, the winner of the Canarian final) qualified for the promotion playoffs.

In the promotion playoffs, the seven teams were divided by draw into two groups: one of four teams and other one of three. The group of four teams played a double-leg knockout format, while the group of three teams played with a double-legged round-robin format. The two group winners promoted to the Primera División.

== Group 1 ==
Pos	Team	Pld	W	D	L	GF	GA	GD	Pts	Qualification or relegation
1	Oviedo	26	25	0	1	113	7	+106	75	Qualification to promotion playoffs
2	Deportivo La Coruña	26	24	1	1	155	11	+144	73	
3	Monte	26	17	3	6	65	34	+31	54	
4	Atlántida Matamá	26	16	1	9	56	29	+27	49	
5	Racing Santander	26	15	1	10	84	42	+42	46	
6	Sárdoma	26	13	3	10	55	35	+20	42	
7	Victoria CF	26	13	2	11	54	46	+8	41	
8	Peluquería Mixta Friol	26	11	4	11	53	54	−1	37	
9	Sporting Gijón	26	10	2	14	55	53	+2	32	
10	Victoria FC	26	9	4	13	32	52	−20	31	
11	Gijón	26	7	2	17	32	74	−42	23	
12	Llanera (R)	26	5	4	17	29	106	−77	19	Relegation to Regional leagues
13	Femiastur (R)	26	3	1	22	24	117	−93	10	Relegation to Regional leagues
14	Vimenor (R)	26	0	0	26	6	153	−147	0	Relegation to Regional leagues

Source: Futbolme.com
Rules for classification: 1) points; 2) head-to-head points; 3) head-to-head goal difference; 4) goal difference; 5) number of goals scored.
(R) Relegated

== Group 2 ==
Pos	Team	Pld	W	D	L	GF	GA	GD	Pts	Qualification or relegation
1	Logroño	26	20	3	3	63	23	+40	63	Qualification to promotion playoffs
2	Athletic Bilbao B	26	19	4	3	96	28	+68	61	
3	Eibar	26	17	5	4	60	30	+30	56	
4	Osasuna	26	14	8	4	50	26	+24	50	
5	San Ignacio	26	14	3	9	54	36	+18	45	
6	Oiartzun	26	12	5	9	47	34	+13	41	
7	Añorga	26	11	7	8	48	40	+8	40	
8	Mulier	26	10	3	13	40	33	+7	33	
9	Pradejón	26	8	5	13	34	59	−25	29	
10	Aurrerá Vitoria	26	8	5	13	37	56	−19	29	
11	Alavés	26	7	7	12	53	56	−3	28	
12	Pauldarrak (R)	26	8	3	15	36	51	−15	27	Relegation to Regional leagues
13	Zarautz (R)	26	3	1	22	26	85	−59	10	Relegation to Regional leagues
14	Ardoi (R)	26	1	1	24	11	98	−87	4	Relegation to Regional leagues

Source: Futbolme.com
Rules for classification: 1) points; 2) head-to-head points; 3) head-to-head goal difference; 4) goal difference; 5) number of goals scored.
(R) Relegated

== Group 3 ==
Pos	Team	Pld	W	D	L	GF	GA	GD	Pts	Qualification or relegation
1	Barcelona B	26	20	3	3	81	17	+64	63	
2	Seagull	26	19	4	3	70	15	+55	61	Qualification to promotion playoffs
3	Collerense	26	19	2	5	68	29	+39	59	
4	Espanyol B	26	16	6	4	51	23	+28	54	
5	AEM	26	15	4	7	59	31	+28	49	
6	Europa	26	13	4	9	52	45	+7	43	
7	Igualada	26	13	3	10	41	48	−7	42	
8	Son Sardina	26	10	5	11	39	55	−16	35	
9	Sant Gabriel	26	8	4	14	40	44	−4	28	
10	Pallejà	26	7	2	17	46	66	−20	23	
11	Pardinyes	26	6	5	15	32	51	−19	23	
12	Levante Las Planas (R)	26	3	8	15	23	67	−44	17	Relegation to Regional leagues
13	Sporting Mahón (R)	26	3	5	18	19	68	−49	14	Relegation to Regional leagues
14	Peña Ferranca (R)	26	2	1	23	25	87	−62	7	Relegation to Regional leagues

Source: Futbolme.com
Rules for classification: 1) points; 2) head-to-head points; 3) head-to-head goal difference; 4) goal difference; 5) number of goals scored.
(R) Relegated

== Group 4 ==
Pos	Team	Pld	W	D	L	GF	GA	GD	Pts	Qualification or relegation
1	Málaga	26	23	2	1	129	6	+123	71	Qualification to promotion playoffs
2	Granada	26	22	2	2	111	12	+99	68	
3	Sporting Huelva B	26	19	4	3	72	30	+42	61	
4	Extremadura	26	16	6	4	75	35	+40	54	
5	Cáceres	26	13	4	9	55	28	+27	43	
6	El Naranjo	26	11	5	10	58	46	+12	38	
7	Santa Teresa B	26	10	5	11	46	52	−6	35	
8	Híspalis	26	7	5	14	30	60	−30	26	
9	La Rambla	26	6	7	13	31	62	−31	25	
10	Pozoalbense	26	6	6	14	48	86	−38	24	
11	San Miguel	26	6	5	15	20	56	−36	23	
12	Puerto de la Torre (R)	26	6	5	15	38	73	−35	23	Relegation to Regional leagues
13	Daimiel (R)	26	3	4	19	25	109	−84	13	Relegation to Regional leagues
14	Polillas Atlético (R)	26	1	6	19	15	98	−83	9	Relegation to Regional leagues

Source: Futbolme.com
Rules for classification: 1) points; 2) head-to-head points; 3) head-to-head goal difference; 4) goal difference; 5) number of goals scored.
(R) Relegated

== Group 5 ==
Pos	Team	Pld	W	D	L	GF	GA	GD	Pts	Qualification or relegation
1	Tacón	26	23	2	1	102	9	+93	71	Qualification to promotion playoffs
2	Atlético Madrid B	26	20	5	1	72	12	+60	65	
3	Parquesol	26	13	8	5	51	31	+20	47	
4	Rayo Vallecano B	26	14	4	8	48	27	+21	46	
5	Madrid CFF B	26	13	5	8	49	43	+6	44	
6	Pozuelo de Alarcón	26	12	7	7	47	36	+11	43	
7	Alhóndiga	26	12	3	11	41	33	+8	39	
8	Dinamo Guadalajara	26	9	6	11	44	36	+8	33	
9	León	26	9	6	11	39	58	−19	33	
10	Olímpico	26	9	3	14	38	50	−12	30	
11	Nuestra Señora de Belén	26	6	7	13	25	51	−26	25	
12	Fuensalida (R)	26	4	4	18	29	88	−59	16	Relegation to Regional leagues
13	Vallecas (R)	26	3	4	19	27	85	−58	13	Relegation to Regional leagues
14	Amigos del Duero (R)	26	1	4	21	30	88	−58	7	Relegation to Regional leagues

Source: Futbolme.com
Rules for classification: 1) points; 2) head-to-head points; 3) head-to-head goal difference; 4) goal difference; 5) number of goals scored.
(R) Relegated

== Group 6 ==
=== Las Palmas Group ===
Pos	Team	Pld	W	D	L	GF	GA	GD	Pts	Qualification or relegation
1	Femarguín	26	26	0	0	240	9	+231	78	Qualification to the Canarian final
2	Juan Grande	26	23	0	3	194	11	+183	69	
3	La Garita	26	23	0	3	155	15	+140	69	
4	Unión Viera	26	18	1	7	135	34	+101	55	
5	Las Majoreras-Guayadeque	26	17	1	8	110	35	+75	52	
6	Las Torres (Note: DDD)	26	13	3	10	54	43	+11	39	
7	Achamán Santa Lucía	26	11	4	11	69	76	−7	37	
8	Flor de Lis Norte	26	8	6	12	77	77	0	30	
9	Montaña Alta	26	7	7	12	55	81	−26	28	
10	Iregui	26	7	4	15	55	77	−22	25	
11	Aguiluchas	26	7	2	17	55	106	−51	23	
12	Firgas	26	4	1	21	29	140	−111	13	
13	Yoñé La Garita	26	1	4	21	30	190	−160	7	
14	Castillo (Note: 3 points deducted.)	26	0	1	25	4	368	−364	−2	

Source: Futbolme.com
Rules for classification: 1) points; 2) head-to-head points; 3) head-to-head goal difference; 4) goal difference; 5) number of goals scored.

=== Tenerife Group ===
Pos	Team	Pld	W	D	L	GF	GA	GD	Pts	Qualification or relegation
1	Tacuense	26	24	1	1	145	11	+134	73	Qualification to the Canarian final
2	Granadilla B	26	23	0	3	186	14	+172	69	
3	Atlético Unión de Güímar	26	20	3	3	90	23	+67	63	
4	Llano del Moro	26	18	3	5	95	25	+70	57	
5	Tarsa	26	12	6	8	62	47	+15	42	
6	Furia Arona	26	13	2	11	72	49	+23	41	
7	San Antonio Pilar	26	11	3	12	43	73	−30	36	
8	Costa Adeje	26	11	2	13	34	43	−9	35	
9	Casablanca	26	9	5	12	45	83	−38	32	
10	Añaza	26	7	5	14	28	90	−62	26	
11	Sanse	26	6	1	19	29	98	−69	19	
12	Geneto del Norte	26	5	2	19	40	109	−69	17	
13	San Marcos Icod	26	3	2	21	20	110	−90	11	
14	Laguna	26	2	1	23	14	128	−114	7	

Source: Futbolme.com
Rules for classification: 1) points; 2) head-to-head points; 3) head-to-head goal difference; 4) goal difference; 5) number of goals scored.

=== Canarian final ===
The winner of the Canarian final will qualify to the promotion stage.

Team 1	Agg.	Team 2	1st leg	2nd leg
Femarguín	4–0	Tacuense	3–0	1–0

== Group 7 ==
Pos	Team	Pld	W	D	L	GF	GA	GD	Pts	Qualification or relegation
1	Sporting Plaza de Argel	26	20	3	3	83	22	+61	63	Qualification to promotion playoffs
2	Levante B	26	16	6	4	48	20	+28	54	
3	Aldaia	26	16	5	5	82	23	+59	53	
4	Alhama	26	12	8	6	36	20	+16	44	
5	Joventut Almassora	26	12	6	8	64	49	+15	42	
6	Marítim	26	12	5	9	37	35	+2	41	
7	Valencia B	26	12	5	9	59	32	+27	41	
8	Villarreal	26	11	4	11	53	41	+12	37	
9	Mislata	26	9	9	8	37	29	+8	36	
10	Lorca FAD	26	9	6	11	41	40	+1	33	
11	La Solana	26	10	2	14	46	46	0	32	
12	CFF Albacete (R)	26	8	6	12	45	52	−7	30	Relegation to Regional leagues
13	Murcia Féminas (R)	26	2	0	24	9	137	−128	6	Relegation to Regional leagues
14	Minerva (R)	26	0	1	25	19	113	−94	1	Relegation to Regional leagues

Source: Futbolme.com
Rules for classification: 1) points; 2) head-to-head points; 3) head-to-head goal difference; 4) goal difference; 5) number of goals scored.
(R) Relegated

== Promotion playoffs ==
=== Four-team group ===
Semi-finals
13–20 May 2018
Logroño	2	0	2
Oviedo	0	1	1
13–20 May 2018
Seagull	0	1	1
Tacón	4	2	6

Final
27 May–3 June 2018
Logroño	1	2	3
Tacón	1	1	2

=== Three-team group ===
Pos	Team	Pld	W	D	L	GF	GA	GD	Pts	Promotion	MGA	FEM	SPA
1	Málaga (P)	4	4	0	0	6	1	+5	12	Promotion to Primera División	—	1–0	2–1
2	Femarguín	4	1	0	3	7	6	+1	3		0–1	—	5–1
3	Sporting Plaza de Argel	4	1	0	3	5	11	−6	3		0–2	3–2	—

Rules for classification: 1) points; 2) goal difference; 3) number of goals scored.
(P) Promoted
