= 2019–20 Segunda División Pro (women) =

Spanish women's 2nd tier association football season

- Season: 2019–20
- Dates: 7 September 2019 – 17 May 2020
- Teams: 32
- Promoted: Eibar; Santa Teresa
- Matches: 352
- Goals: 1,071 (3.04 per match)
- Top goalscorer: Belén Martínez (16 goals)
- Biggest home win: Juan Grande 8–0 Collerense (3 November 2019)
- Biggest away win: Friol 1–6 Osasuna (1 December 2019)
- Highest scoring: Barcelona B 7–2 Oviedo (27 October 2019); Barcelona B 7–2 Madrid CFF B (19 January 2020)

The 2019–20 Segunda División Pro, named Reto Iberdrola for sponsorship reasons, was the inaugural season edition of the new Spanish women's football second-tier league.

The league started on 7 September 2019 and will end on 17 May 2020.

On 6 May 2020, the Royal Spanish Football Federation announced the premature end of the league, revoking relegations and naming Eibar and Santa Teresa as promoted teams.

== Teams and locations ==
Location of the 2019–20 Segunda División Group North teams.

32 teams took part, 30 moving up from the 2018–19 Segunda División and 2 relegated from the 2018–19 Primera División.

Atlántida Matamá resigned to its place in the league. Sporting Gijón occupied its place as the next qualified team in their group from the previous season.

Group North
Team	Municipality
AEM	Lleida
Alavés	Vitoria-Gasteiz
Athletic Bilbao B	Bilbao
Atlético Madrid B	Madrid
Barcelona B	Barcelona
Eibar	Eibar
Friol	Friol
Madrid CFF B	San Sebastián de los Reyes
Osasuna	Pamplona
Oviedo	Oviedo
Parquesol	Valladolid
Pozuelo de Alarcón	Pozuelo de Alarcón
Racing Santander	Santander
Seagull	Badalona
Sporting Gijón	Gijón
Zaragoza CFF	Zaragoza

Location of the 2019–20 Segunda División Group South teams.
Canary Islands location of the 2019–20 Segunda División Group South teams

Group South
Team	Municipality
Alhama	Alhama de Murcia
Cáceres	Cáceres
Collerense	Palma de Mallorca
Córdoba	Córdoba
Femarguín	Mogán
Fundación Albacete	Albacete
Granada	Granada
Granadilla B	Granadilla de Abona
Juan Grande	San Bartolomé de Tirajana
Levante B	Valencia
Málaga	Málaga
Pozoalbense	Pozoblanco
Santa Teresa	Badajoz
Tacuense	San Cristóbal de La Laguna
Valencia B	Valencia
Villarreal	Villarreal

== Standings and results ==
=== Group North ===
==== Standings ====
Pos	Team	Pld	W	D	L	GF	GA	GD	Pts	Promotion or relegation
1	Athletic Bilbao B (I)	22	15	3	4	43	17	+26	48	Reserve team, ineligible for promotion
2	Eibar (P)	22	13	7	2	37	13	+24	46	Promotion to Primera División
3	Barcelona B	22	14	3	5	61	28	+33	45	
4	Osasuna	22	13	2	7	41	24	+17	41	
5	Alavés	22	12	5	5	38	26	+12	41	
6	Seagull	22	10	5	7	38	27	+11	35	
7	AEM	22	10	5	7	29	28	+1	35	
8	Zaragoza CFF	22	10	2	10	43	46	−3	32	
9	Oviedo	22	9	4	9	37	37	0	31	
10	Parquesol	22	7	7	8	33	31	+2	28	
11	Madrid CFF B	22	7	5	10	27	40	−13	26	
12	Atlético Madrid B	22	7	5	10	32	34	−2	26	
13	Racing Santander	22	8	1	13	37	35	+2	25	
14	Friol	22	6	1	15	25	55	−30	19	
15	Pozuelo de Alarcón	22	4	1	17	12	40	−28	13	
16	Sporting Gijón	22	2	2	18	12	64	−52	8	

Source: RFEF
Rules for classification: 1) points; 2) head-to-head points; 3) goal difference; 4) number of goals scored
(I) ?; (P) Promoted

==== Results ====
Home \ Away	AEM	ALA	ATH	ATM	BAR	EIB	FRI	MAD	OSA	OVI	PAR	POZ	RAC	SEA	SPO	ZAR
AEM	—		2–0	2–2	0–3	0–0		2–1	3–0	2–1	1–0	3–1	3–2		1–1	1–0
Alavés	1–0	—	1–1	3–2	3–2	1–1	1–0	1–1		2–0		2–0			4–0	3–1
Athletic Bilbao B	2–0		—	1–1	3–1	0–2		4–2	1–1	4–1		4–0	2–0	0–2		
Atlético Madrid B		2–1	0–1	—	0–1	1–1	5–2	0–1	1–0	1–2		2–0		3–2		1–4
Barcelona B	3–1	0–2			—	0–0	6–0	7–2		7–2	2–1		2–4	3–1	5–0	
Eibar	2–1	2–0				—	4–0	0–1	0–1		1–0	2–1	3–2	1–0	4–0	1–1
Friol	4–1	2–1	0–3	3–1	2–2	0–3	—		1–6	1–4			4–2	0–1		1–3
Madrid CFF B			0–4	1–1	0–3		2–1	—	4–1	2–0	1–1	2–1		1–1	2–0	2–3
Osasuna		2–2	0–2		0–2	2–4		1–0	—	1–0	3–0	2–0		0–2	4–0	1–0
Oviedo		1–2		2–1	2–2	1–1	3–0	2–1		—	2–2	2–0	4–0	2–1	0–1	
Parquesol	1–1	1–1	1–0	1–5		0–0	1–0		0–1		—	3–1	0–4		7–0	5–1
Pozuelo de Alarcón	1–0		0–1	1–0	0–4	3–0	0–1		1–2		0–0	—	1–0		2–1	1–3
Racing Santander		2–0	0–1	1–1	3–0	1–2	1–0	2–0	1–3	1–3	1–3		—		4–0	5–0
Seagull	1–1	0–1	2–3	4–1	1–2		5–2			1–1	2–2	1–0	2–1	—	3–1	3–0
Sporting Gijón	0–2	0–4	0–3	0–1			0–1	0–2		a	1–3	2–1		1–1	—	
Zaragoza CFF	1–2	6–2	1–2		1–4			2–2	3–2	4–2	2–1		1–0	1–2	5–3	—

Source: RFEF
Legend: Blue = home team win; Yellow = draw; Red = away team win.

=== Top goalscorers ===
Rank	Player	Club	Goals
1	(Spain) Clàudia Pina	Barcelona B	15
1	(Paraguay) Lice Chamorro	Racing Santander	15
3	(Spain) Amaiur Sarriegi	Athletic Bilbao B	13
3	(United States) Maddy Williams	Zaragoza CFF	13
5	(Spain) Carla Armengol	Barcelona B	12

Source: BDFutbol

=== Group South ===
==== Standings ====
Pos	Team	Pld	W	D	L	GF	GA	GD	Pts	Promotion or relegation
1	Santa Teresa (P)	22	16	3	3	43	15	+28	51	Promotion to Primera División
2	Granada	22	16	2	4	43	15	+28	50	
3	Fundación Albacete	22	14	5	3	48	16	+32	47	
4	Villarreal	22	13	3	6	37	24	+13	42	
5	Málaga	22	9	9	4	28	21	+7	36	
6	Alhama	22	9	8	5	40	31	+9	35	
7	Pozoalbense	22	9	5	8	36	39	−3	32	
8	Córdoba	22	8	7	7	21	21	0	31	
9	Cáceres	22	8	6	8	36	36	0	30	
10	Granadilla B	22	8	4	10	27	36	−9	28	
11	Femarguín	22	8	3	11	34	36	−2	27	
12	Levante B	22	6	6	10	31	33	−2	24	
13	Valencia B	22	6	3	13	24	34	−10	21	
14	Juan Grande	22	4	4	14	28	39	−11	16	
15	Tacuense	22	3	3	16	18	57	−39	12	
16	Collerense	22	2	3	17	31	72	−41	9	

Source: RFEF
Rules for classification: 1) points; 2) head-to-head points; 3) goal difference; 4) number of goals scored
(P) Promoted

==== Results ====
Home \ Away	ALH	CAC	COL	COR	FEM	ALB	GRN	GDL	JGR	LEV	MGA	PZA	STE	TAC	VAL	VIL
Alhama	—		4–2		3–3	2–1	2–1	3–1	1–0	2–2	0–0				2–2	1–2
Cáceres	2–0	—	5–1	1–1		3–3	2–0		3–3	2–1	1–2	1–2	1–2	4–1		
Collerense			—	1–3	4–2	1–3	1–4	2–1		1–2	0–0	3–4		4–4	0–2	2–2
Córdoba	1–1	1–0	2–1	—	0–1	0–0	0–1			2–1	1–1	0–2			2–1	3–1
Femarguín	2–3	0–0	3–2		—	0–1	2–3	0–1		2–1	0–1	1–1	0–2	5–1		
Fundación Albacete	1–1			1–0	3–2	—	1–0	4–1	4–0	1–0		5–0	0–1	7–0	2–0	
Granada		7–0	3–2	3–0			—	1–0	2–1		2–0	0–0	1–1	4–0	1–0	1–0
Granadilla B	0–0	1–1		2–0	1–3	0–3		—	2–0		0–1		1–0	3–0	1–0	2–4
Juan Grande	0–3	1–2	8–0	0–0	0–1	0–1		5–2	—			1–3	0–2		0–2	0–0
Levante B	1–2	3–2	4–2		1–3	1–1	1–2	1–1	4–2	—	1–2	1–4	0–0		3–0	
Málaga	3–2	0–2				2–2	0–2	1–1	0–0		—	1–1	1–1	4–0	3–1	2–1
Pozoalbense	2–2		5–1	0–2	2–1			3–4	0–3		1–1	—	1–3	0–1	2–1	2–1
Santa Teresa	2–0	2–0	4–1	2–1	1–2	2–1		4–1	4–1	1–0	2–1		—			0–2
Tacuense	1–5	1–2	2–0	1–1			0–3	0–1	1–2	1–1		4–0	0–3	—	0–3	0–1
Valencia B		1–1		0–0	3–0				2–1	0–2	0–2		0–4	2–0	—	0–1
Villarreal	2–1	3–1	5–0	0–1	2–1	0–3	1–0			0–0		2–1		2–0	5–3	—

Source: RFEF
Legend: Blue = home team win; Yellow = draw; Red = away team win.

=== Top goalscorers ===
Rank	Player	Club	Goals
1	(Spain) Belén Martínez	Santa Teresa	16
2	(Spain) Estefanía Lima	Santa Teresa	15
3	(Spain) Helena Torres	Alhama	13
4	(Argentina) Belén Potassa	Fundación Albacete	11
3	(Spain) Aixa Salvador	Villarreal	10
3	(Spain) Mar Rubio	Juan Grande	10
3	(Spain) Pili Espadas	Collerense	10

Source: BDFutbol
