= Gijón FF =

Association football club in Spain

- Full name: Gijón Fútbol Femenino
- Founded: 2000; 25 years ago
- Ground: La Cruz, Gijón
- Manager: Iván Valdés
- League: Primera Nacional
- 2018–19: 11th, Group 1
Home colours	Away colours

Gijón Fútbol Femenino is a Spanish women's football club from Gijón established in 2000. As part of an agreement, the club acts de facto as UC Ceares's women's football section.

== History ==
Gijón Fútbol Femenino was founded in 2000 by a group of sixteen women who disagreed with the work of their respective clubs in women's football. In its first season the club played in Regional league of Asturias and promoted to Segunda División by winning all its games played.

After topping its group of Segunda División for three consecutive seasons, Gijón FF promoted to the Superliga in 2005, after beating CD Nuestra Señora de Belén and UE L'Estartit in the promotion play-offs. In the debut at Superliga, Gijón ended last setting a negative record with one draw and 23 losses, and it was relegated.

The team gradually declined in subsequent years until it was relegated from Segunda División to the Regional League in 2015.

In that year 2015, Gijón FF signed a collaboration agreement with Tercera División club UC Ceares, for sharing La Cruz stadium and to create a youth academy for boys and girls.

One year after its relegation, Gijón FF promoted again to Segunda División and avoided the relegation in its coming-back season.

== Season by season ==
Season	League								
Season	Div.	Pos.	P	W	D	L	F	A	Pts
2000–01	Reg.	1st	24	24	0	0	184	13	72
2001–02	2ª	2nd	18	11	3	4	47	26	36
2002–03	2ª	1st	22	14	4	4	67	39	46
2002–03	2ª	L	2	0	0	2	0	16	0
2003–04	2ª	1st	22	20	1	1	91	34	61
2003–04	2ª	L	2	0	1	1	5	6	1
2004–05	2ª	1st	26	20	4	2	97	26	64
2004–05	2ª	W	2	2	0	0	5	1	6
2005–06	1ª	13th	24	0	1	23	19	96	1
2006–07	2ª	3rd	26	17	2	7	61	28	53
2007–08	2ª	4th	26	15	6	5	66	30	51
2008–09	2ª	6th	25	12	2	11	54	44	38
2009–10	2ª	10th	26	8	7	11	43	52	31
2010–11	2ª	4th	26	12	8	6	48	42	44
2011–12	2ª	11th	26	7	4	15	35	53	25
2012–13	2ª	11th	26	7	6	13	32	66	27
2013–14	2ª	8th	26	10	3	13	42	55	33
2014–15	2ª	13th	26	8	4	14	40	54	28
2015–16	Reg.	2nd	26	23	1	2	158	22	70
2016–17	2ª	10th	26	7	4	15	35	86	25
2017–18	2ª	11th	26	7	2	17	32	74	23
2018–19	2ª	11th (Note: Due to the creation of the new Primera División B, the team remained in the same league but it became the third level.)	26	5	4	17	27	85	19
2019–20	1ª N	10th	19	5	4	10	23	40	19
