= Club Hispano =

Spanish football club

Hispano
- Full name: Club Hispano de Castrillón
- Nicknames: Verdinegros; Hispanos
- Founded: 17 October 1925; 101 years ago
- Stadium: Estadio de Ferrota
- Capacity: 3,000
- President: Nacho Nuevo
- Head coach: Isaac Marquínez
- League: Primera Asturfútbol
- 2025–26: Primera Asturfútbol, 6th of 19
- Website: http://www.clubhispanodecastrillon.blogspot.com/
Home colours	Away colours

Club Hispano de Castrillón is a Spanish football club based in Piedras Blancas, Castrillón, Asturias. Founded in 1925, it plays it currently in Primera Asturfútbol, holding its home games at Estadio de Ferrota

== History ==
Club Hispano de Castrillón was founded in 1925, but ceased activities in 1934 and only returned to play in 1950. Between 1986 and 1994, the club lived its golden era, qualifying several times for the promotion play-offs to Segunda División B and also for the Copa del Rey, where the club reached twice the third round.

In 2008 the club was relegated from Tercera División. This one would be the first of three consecutive relegations that left the club in the last tier of Asturian football.

With the club immersed in a serious financial trouble, it achieves its first promotion from the last stage in 2014.

== Season to season ==
Season	Tier	Division	Place	Copa del Rey
1950–51	5	2ª Reg.		
1951–52	5	2ª Reg.		
1952–53	5	2ª Reg.		
1953–54	5	2ª Reg.		
1954–55	5	2ª Reg.		
1955–56	4	1ª Reg.	4th	
1956–57	5	2ª Reg.		
1957–58	4	1ª Reg.	2nd	
1958–59	3	3ª	9th	
1959–60	3	3ª	15th	
1960–61	4	1ª Reg.	7th	
1961–62	4	1ª Reg.	12th	
1962–63	4	1ª Reg.	15th	
1963–64	5	2ª Reg.	6th	
1964–65	5	2ª Reg.	5th	
1965–66	5	2ª Reg.	4th	
1966–67	5	2ª Reg.	4th	
1967–68	5	2ª Reg.	10th	
1968–69	5	2ª Reg.	2nd	
1969–70	5	2ª Reg.	2nd	

Season	Tier	Division	Place	Copa del Rey
1970–71	5	2ª Reg.	1st	
1971–72	4	1ª Reg.	11th	
1972–73	4	1ª Reg.	11th	
1973–74	4	Reg. Pref.	13th	
1974–75	4	Reg. Pref.	14th	
1975–76	4	Reg. Pref.	8th	
1976–77	4	Reg. Pref.	16th	
1977–78	5	Reg. Pref.	19th	
1978–79	6	1ª Reg.	6th	
1979–80	6	1ª Reg.	1st	
1980–81	5	Reg. Pref.	14th	
1981–82	5	Reg. Pref.	17th	
1982–83	6	1ª Reg.	3rd	
1983–84	5	Reg. Pref.	7th	
1984–85	5	Reg. Pref.	1st	
1985–86	4	3ª	14th	
1986–87	4	3ª	6th	
1987–88	4	3ª	14th	Second round
1988–89	4	3ª	8th	
1989–90	4	3ª	2nd	

Season	Tier	Division	Place	Copa del Rey
1990–91	4	3ª	4th	Third round
1991–92	4	3ª	2nd	First round
1992–93	4	3ª	5th	Third round
1993–94	4	3ª	8th	First round
1994–95	4	3ª	7th	
1995–96	4	3ª	15th	
1996–97	4	3ª	12th	
1997–98	4	3ª	19th	
1998–99	5	Reg. Pref.	4th	
1999–2000	5	Reg. Pref.	6th	
2000–01	5	Reg. Pref.	9th	
2001–02	5	Reg. Pref.	1st	
2002–03	4	3ª	11th	
2003–04	4	3ª	16th	
2004–05	4	3ª	15th	
2005–06	4	3ª	17th	
2006–07	4	3ª	15th	
2007–08	4	3ª	19th	
2008–09	5	Reg. Pref.	19th	
2009–10	6	1ª Reg.	17th	

Season	Tier	Division	Place	Copa del Rey
2010–11	7	2ª Reg.	10th	
2011–12	7	2ª Reg.	6th	
2012–13	7	2ª Reg.	3rd	
2013–14	7	2ª Reg.	2nd	
2014–15	6	1ª Reg.	5th	
2015–16	6	1ª Reg.	10th	
2016–17	6	1ª Reg.	8th	
2017–18	6	1ª Reg.	6th	
2018–19	6	1ª Reg.	11th	
2019–20	6	1ª Reg.	12th	
2020–21	6	1ª Reg.	2nd	
2021–22	7	1ª Reg.	8	
2022–23	7	2ª RFFPA	15th	
2023–24	7	2ª Astur.	2nd	
2024–25	7	2ª Astur.	1st	
2025–26	6	1ª Astur.		

- 21 seasons in Tercera División

== Women's team ==
Hispano created a women's team in 2011, that plays in the Regional league of Asturias.

It was retired at the end of the 2016–17 season.

=== Season to season ===
Season	Division	Place	Copa de la Reina
2011/12	Regional	11th	
2012/13	Regional	10th	
2013/14	Regional	13th	
2014/15	Regional	11th	
2015/16	Regional	10th	
2016/17	Regional	12th	
