= Patxi Izco =

Spanish businessperson (1946–2023)

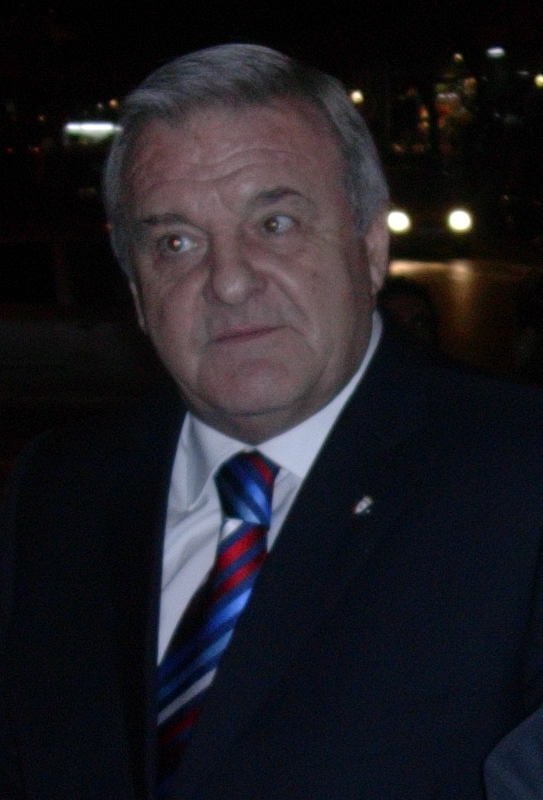

Francisco José "Patxi" Izco Ilundain (16 March 1946 – 21 April 2023) was a Spanish businessman. He was the president of CA Osasuna from 2002 to 2012.

His mandate saw the club reach the Copa del Rey final in 2005, finish fourth in La Liga in 2005–06, and reach the UEFA Cup semi-finals in 2006–07. In 2021, he was convicted of misappropriation of funds and of false accounting, being given a suspended prison sentence and made to return €1.15 million to the club.

== Biography ==
Born in Gazólaz in Navarre, Izco succeeded Javier Miranda as president of CA Osasuna in 2002. Upon arriving, he brought in former club player and Mexico international manager Javier Aguirre as the head coach.

Osasuna reached the Copa del Rey final in 2005, losing to Real Betis and qualifying for the UEFA Cup. In 2005–06, the team finished fourth in La Liga and qualified for the UEFA Champions League, being eliminated by Hamburger SV but advancing in the UEFA Cup to a semi-final defeat to compatriots Sevilla FC.

In December 2005, Izco sold the naming rights of the El Sadar Stadium to the Government of Navarre for the next three years. The government renamed the stadium "Reyno de Navarra" after its tourism brand, for a total fee of €4.5 million. The naming was revoked in July 2012, shortly after Izco's exit, as the government pulled the investment over Osasuna's debts.

Izco was re-elected as club president in 2006 and 2010. In April 2012, with two more years of his mandate, he announced he would leave at the end of the season due to fatigue. His team, who had previously been known for frequent relegations and promotions, had been in La Liga for every season of his presidency.

In his final interview as club president, Izco told the Diario de Navarra that he disliked women's football, calling it "unsightly" and saying that women should play other sports. Spain's union of women footballers condemned him for this declaration.

In September 2021, Izco was sentenced to 23 months and 15 days in prison and a fine of €1.15 million to Osasuna for misappropriation of funds and false accounting. The prosecution had been launched by Osasuna itself. Due to accepting the sentence, Izco did not have to go to prison.

Izco was married and had four children. He died in Pamplona on 21 April 2023, aged 77.
