= Belén Martínez =

Spanish footballer (born 1988)

Personal information
- Full name: Belén Martínez Sousa
- Date of birth: 24 November 1988 (age 37)
- Place of birth: Olivenza, Spain
- Position: Forward

Team information
- Current team: Alhama CF
- Number: 19

Senior career*
Years	Team	Apps	(Gls)
2009–2012	Llanos de Olivenza	27+	(5+)
2013–2014	Cáceres		
2014–2016	Llanos de Olivenza		
2016–2018	Extremadura		
2018–2021	Santa Teresa	52+	(22+)
2021–2023	Villarreal	63	(10)
2023–	Alhama CF	88	(26)
- * Club domestic league appearances and goals as of 31 May 2025

Belén Martínez Sousa (born 24 November 1988) is a Spanish footballer who plays as a forward for Alhama CF.

== Club career ==
Martínez started her career at Llanos de Olivenza.
