= Divisiones Regionales de Fútbol Femenino =

- Country: Spain
- Divisions: 16
- Level on pyramid: 5 and lower
- Promotion to: Primera Nacional

The Divisiones Regionales de Fútbol Femenino are the Spanish women's football regional divisions. They are administered by the Autonomous football federations. The level immediately above is the Primera Nacional. The autonomous regional divisions include:

== Divisions ==
| Community | Level 5 | Level 6 | Level 7 |
|---|---|---|---|
| Andalusia (FAF) | Segunda Andaluza (8 groups): Almería province; Cádiz province; Córdoba province; Granada province; Huelva province; Jaén province; Málaga province; Sevilla province | —N/a | |
| Aragon (FAF) | Regional (2 groups) | —N/a | |
| Asturias (RFFPA) | Regional Femenino (2 groups) | —N/a | |
| Balearic Islands (FFIB) | Autonómica | Mallorca Regional | —N/a |
| Basque Country (FVF–EFF) | Basque League | Regional Provincial (3 groups): Álava province; Gipuzkoa province; Vizcaya province | —N/a |
| Canary Islands (FCF) | Interinsular (2 groups) | —N/a | |
| Cantabria (FCF) | Cántabra Femenina | —N/a | |
| Castile-La Mancha (FFCM) | Regional (2 groups) | —N/a | |
| Castile and León (FCyLF) | Primera Regional | Segunda Regional | —N/a |
| Catalonia (FCF) | Preferente | Primera Catalana (2 groups) | Segona Catalana (4 groups) |
| Community of Madrid (FFM) | Regional Preferente | Primera Regional (5 groups) | —N/a |
| Extremadura (FEF) | Autonómica | —N/a | |
| Galicia (FGF) | Primera División | Segunda División (4 groups) | —N/a |
| La Rioja (FRF) | Femenina Riojana | —N/a | |
| Navarre (FNF) | Regional Preferente | —N/a | |
| Region of Murcia (FFRM) | Preferente Autonómica | Primera Autonómica | —N/a |
| Valencian Community (FFCV) | Preferent | Primera Regional (3 groups) | Segona Regional (5 groups) |
| Ceuta (FFC) | —N/a | | |
| Melilla (FMF) | —N/a | | |

== Women's football licences in each autonomous community ==
| Rank | Autonomous community | Licence | Population | License density |
|---|---|---|---|---|
| 1 | (Catalonia) Catalunya | 10 978 | 7 465 619 | 680,05 |
| 2 | (Andalusia) Andalucía | 8 712 | 8 394 209 | 963,52 |
| 3 | (Valencian Community) Comunidad Valenciana | 5 220 | 4 988 464 | 955,64 |
| 4 | (Community of Madrid) Comunidad de Madrid | 3 981 | 6 409 216 | 1 609,95 |
| 5 | (Basque Country (autonomous community)) País Vasco | 2 946 | 2 174 474 | 738,11 |
| 6 | (Galicia (Spain)) Galicia | 1 931 | 2 761 730 | 1 430,11 |
| 7 | Extremadura | 801* (1.698**) | 1 101 303 | 648,59** |
| 8 | (Aragon) Aragón | 1 635 | 1 338 495 | 818,65 |
| 9 | (Canary Islands) Canarias | 1 774 | 2 105 851 | 1 187,06 |
| 10 | (Castile and León) Castilla y León | 1 231 | 2 517 157 | 2 044,81 |
| 11 | (Castilla–La Mancha) Castilla-La Mancha | 1 216 | 2 094 957 | 1 722,83 |
| 12 | (Navarre) Navarra | 1 159 | 638 390 | 550,81 |
| 13 | (Region of Murcia) Región de Murcia | 1 024 | 1 459 671 | 1 425,46 |
| 14 | (Balearic Islands) Islas Baleares | 895 | 1 110 399 | 1 240,67 |
| 15 | Cantabria | 493 | 589 651 | 1 196,05 |
| 16 | Principado de Asturias | 342* | 1 067 457 | 3 121,22* |
| 17 | La Rioja | 274 | 319 003 | 1 164,24 |
| 18 | Ceuta | 163 | 84 504 | 518,43 |
| 19 | Melilla | 98* (211**) | 83 762 | 396,97** |
| | TOTAL | 44.873* | 47.190.493 | 1.051,64* |

Source: * Only women's licences in elite level ** Licences in 2013
