= 2007–08 FC Barcelona Femení season =

FC Barcelona Femení
2007–08 season
- Chairman: Joan Laporta
- Manager: Xavi Llorens
- Stadium: Ciutat Esportiva Joan Gamper
- League: 1st & ▲ promotion
- Copa Catalunya: Runner-up
| Home colours | Away colours |

The 2007–08 season was the twentieth season for FC Barcelona Femení in official competition, and their fourth in the Segunda División (as the second tier). It was their only non-consecutive season in the Segunda División, and the only time they competed in the second tier following relegation. Their fourth time winning their group of the second tier, they maintained their 100% league leaders record in the division, as well as setting the record for the most Segunda División league titles. As of 2024, it is the last time they were not in the top flight.

After winning the Segunda División, Barcelona entered Group 2 of the promotion play-offs, which they won to rejoin the Superliga. At the start of the season, they had finished as runner-up in the Copa Catalunya.

== Squad ==
=== Players ===
As of January 2008

Note: Flags indicate national team as defined under FIFA eligibility rules; some limited exceptions apply. Players may hold more than one non-FIFA nationality.

| No. | Pos. | Nation | Player |
|---|---|---|---|
| — | GK | (Spain) ESP | Laura Ràfols |
| — | GK | (Spain) ESP | Cristina Molina |
| — | DF | (Spain) ESP | Ana María Escribano |
| — | DF | (Spain) ESP | Sarai Lucha |
| — | DF | (Spain) ESP | Sheila Sanchón |
| — | DF | (Spain) ESP | Melanie Serrano |
| — | DF | (Spain) ESP | Esther Romero |
| — | DF | (Spain) ESP | Clara Villanueva |
| — | DF | (Spain) ESP | Verónica Navarro |
| — | DF | (Spain) ESP | Cynthia Pidal |
| — | DF | (Spain) ESP | Silvia Vila |

| No. | Pos. | Nation | Player |
|---|---|---|---|
| — | DF | (Spain) ESP | Marta Yáñez |
| — | MF | (Spain) ESP | Marta Unzué |
| — | MF | (Spain) ESP | Alba Mena |
| — | MF | (Spain) ESP | Zaida González |
| — | MF | (Spain) ESP | Sandra "Avión" Jiménez |
| — | FW | (Spain) ESP | Paulina Ferré |
| — | FW | (Spain) ESP | Elba Unzué |
| — | FW | (Spain) ESP | Jesica Todó |
| — | FW | (Spain) ESP | Aida García |
| — | FW | (Spain) ESP | Cristina Macho |

==== Reserves ====
Players from Barcelona B who are eligible to play for the first team Note: Flags indicate national team as defined under FIFA eligibility rules; some limited exceptions apply. Players may hold more than one non-FIFA nationality.

| No. | Pos. | Nation | Player |
|---|---|---|---|
| — | FW | (Spain) ESP | Laura Carriba |

=== Staff ===
As of January 2008

- Head coach: Xavi Llorens
- Assistant coach: Berta Carles

== Transfers ==
=== In ===
| No. | Pos. | Nat. | Player | Moving from | Source |
Summer
| | DF | (Spain) | Verónica Navarro | Zaragoza | |
| | DF | (Spain) | Clara Villanueva | | |
| | MF | (Spain) | Sandra Jiménez "Avión" | Sevilla | |
| | FW | (Spain) | Cristina Macho | | |
| | GK | (Spain) | Laura Ràfols | Barcelona B | |
| | DF | (Spain) | Cynthia Pidal | Barcelona B | |
| | DF | (Spain) | Marta Yáñez | Barcelona B | |
| | DF | (Spain) | Silvia Vila | Barcelona B | |

=== Out ===
| No. | Pos. | Nat. | Player | Moving to | Source |
Summer
| | MF | (Spain) | Vicky Losada | Espanyol | |
| | GK | (Spain) | Marina Marimon | Espanyol | |
| | FW | (Spain) | Berta Carles | Retired | |
| | MF | (Spain) | Alba Vilas | Tortosa | |
| | FW | (Spain) | Laia Ramón | CE Europa | |
| | FW | (Spain) | Cristina Vega | Barcelona B | |
| | FW | (Spain) | Judith Acedo | Levante Las Planas | |
| | FW | (Spain) | Anair Lomba | Unión Guardesa | |

== Pre-season and friendlies ==
=== Friendlies ===
| 17 June 2007 | Levante Las Planas A | 1–4 | Barcelona A |
| | | Report |

| 17 February 2008 | Barcelona A | 2–1 | Vilanova i La Geltrú |
| | | Report |

| 4 May 2008 Friendly | Barcelona A | 3–1 | UE L'Estartit |
| | | Report |

=== Torneig de Getxo ===
| 21 March 2008 Group A, match 1 | Zaragoza | 1–2 | Barcelona | Getxo |
| | | Report | | Stadium: Estadi de Bolue |

| 21 March 2008 Group A, match 3 | Athletic Club B | 0–1 | Barcelona | Getxo |
| | | Report | | Stadium: Estadi de Bolue |

| 22 March 2008 Final | Barcelona | 0–1 | Oviedo Moderno | Getxo |
| | | Report | | Stadium: Municipal de Fadura |

=== Salou International Women's Tournament ===
| 18 May 2008 Group stage | Barcelona | 1–1 | (France) Montpellier | Salou |
| | | Report |

| 18 May 2008 Group stage | Atlético Madrid | 0–1 | Barcelona | Salou |
| | | Report |
Note: Barcelona come second in the group on goal difference

| 19 May 2008 Third place play-off | Barcelona | 6–2 | Sevilla | Salou |
| | | Report |

== Competitions ==
Win Draw Loss

=== Copa Catalunya ===
| 29 August 2007 Semifinal | Barcelona | 7–0 | CE Europa | Sant Joan Despí |
| | Zaida; Clara; Cris; Avión; Marta Unzué; Romi | | | Stadium: Municipal de Les Planes |

| 11 September 2007 Final | Barcelona | 0–3 | Espanyol | Sant Joan Despí |
| | | Report | Noemí 4'; Marta Cubí 19'; Adriana 49' | Stadium: Municipal de Les Planes |

=== League ===
==== First split ====
| 2 September 2007 1 | Barcelona | 4–0 | CD Son Cotoner | Sant Joan Despí |
| | Cristina Macho 37'; Sandra Jiménez 64'; Marta Yáñez 80'; Elba Unzué 84' | Report | | Stadium: Ciutat Esportiva Joan Gamper |

| 9 September 2007 2 | UD Collerense | 1–3 | Barcelona | Palma |
| | 1-1 Cristina (min.55) | Report | Romero 21'; Zaida 82'; Jessica 90' | Stadium: Camp Municipal Coll d'en Rebassa |

| 16 September 2007 3 | Barcelona | 3–1 | CE Sant Gabriel | Sant Joan Despí |
| | Albita 41'; Sandra 74', 80' | Report | 0-1 Cristina (40') | Stadium: Ciutat Esportiva Joan Gamper |

| 23 September 2007 4 | UE Lleida | 0–4 | Barcelona | Lleida |
| | | Report | Marta 15'; Todó 35', 48'; Melanie 44' |

| 7 October 2007 5 | Barcelona B | 2–0 | PBiB La Roca | Sant Joan Despí |
| | Todó 80'; Elba 87' | | | Stadium: Ciutat Esportiva Joan Gamper; Referee: Monfort González |

| 14 October 2007 6 | UE L'Estartit B | 1–5 | Barcelona | L'Estartit |
| | | Report |

| 21 October 2007 7 | Barcelona | 1–2 | Espanyol B | Sant Joan Despí |
| | Marta Yáñez | Report | Rocío | Stadium: Ciutat Esportiva Joan Gamper |

| 4 November 2007 8 | CE Banyoles | 0–2 | Barcelona | Banyoles |
| | | Report |

| 11 November 2007 9 | Barcelona | 5–3 | Europa | Sant Joan Despí |
| | Todó; Sandra; Melanie; Sheila; Marta | Report | | Stadium: Ciutat Esportiva Joan Gamper |

| 18 November 2007 10 | CFF Tortosa Ebre | 0–6 | Barcelona | Tortosa |
| | | Report | | Stadium: Municipal de Tortosa |

| 2 December 2007 11 | Barcelona | 8–0 | UE Breda | Sant Joan Despí |
| | Marta; Sheila; Elba; Melanie; Carriba; Sandra | Report | | Stadium: Ciutat Esportiva Joan Gamper |

| 9 December 2007 12 | UE Rubí | 0–13 | Barcelona B | Rubí |

| 16 December 2007 13 | Barcelona | 3–0 | Girona | Sant Joan Despí |
| | | | | Stadium: Ciutat Esportiva Joan Gamper |

==== Second split ====
| 6 January 2008 14 | CD Son Cotoner | 2–2 | Barcelona | Palma |

| 13 January 2008 15 | Barcelona | 3–1 | UD Collerense | Sant Joan Despí |
| | | | | Stadium: Ciutat Esportiva Joan Gamper |

| 20 January 2008 16 | CE Sant Gabriel | 2–0 | Barcelona | Sant Adrià de Besòs |

| 27 January 2008 17 | Barcelona | 10–1 | UE Lleida | Sant Joan Despí |
| | Sheila; Laura Carriba; Vero; Pau; Yáñez; Sandra | Report | | Stadium: Ciutat Esportiva Joan Gamper |

| 3 February 2008 18 | PBiB La Roca | 0–6 | Barcelona | La Roca del Vallès |
| | | Report | Sheila |

| 10 February 2008 19 | Barcelona | 4–1 | UE L'Estartit B | Sant Joan Despí |
| | Sheila; Sandra | Report | | Stadium: Ciutat Esportiva Joan Gamper |

| 2 March 2008 20 | Espanyol B | 0–4 | Barcelona | Sant Adrià del Besòs |
| | | | | Stadium: Ciutat Esportiva de Sant Adrià |

| 9 March 2008 21 | Barcelona | 6–0 | CE Banyoles | Sant Joan Despí |
| | Clara Villanueva; Sheila; Sandra; Jessica; Alba | Report | | Stadium: Ciutat Esportiva Joan Gamper |

| 16 March 2008 22 | Europa | 1–2 | Barcelona | Barcelona |
| | | Report | Sandra |

| 30 March 2008 23 | Barcelona | 11–0 | CFF Tortosa Ebre | Sant Joan Despí |
| | | Report | | Stadium: Ciutat Esportiva Joan Gamper |

| 6 April 2008 24 | UE Breda | 1–9 | Barcelona | Breda |

| 13 April 2008 25 | Barcelona | 11–0 | UE Rubí | Sant Joan Despí |
| | Aida; Jessica Todó; Sandra; Elba; Alba; Pau | Report | | Stadium: Ciutat Esportiva Joan Gamper |

| 20 April 2008 26 | Girona | 0–0 | Barcelona | Girona |
| | | Report |

=== Promotion play-offs ===
| 1 June 2008 1 | Pozuelo | 1–3 | Barcelona | Pozuelo de Alarcón |
| | | Report | Sandra 21', 55'; Laura Carriba 75' |

| 8 June 2008 2 | bye |

| 15 June 2008 3 | Barcelona | 7–1 | FVPR El Olivo | Sant Joan Despí |
| | Sheila 4', 7'; Elba 40'; Ani 45'; Sandra 55', 75'; Yáñez 76' | Report | Tami 87' | Stadium: Ciutat Esportiva Joan Gamper; Referee: Luis Company |
