= 2011–12 Primera División (women) =

Primera División
- Season: 2011–12
- Champions: Barcelona
- Champions League: Barcelona
- Matches: 306
- Goals: 1,131 (3.7 per match)

The 2011–12 Primera División (women) season will be the 24th since its establishment. Rayo Vallecano are the defending champions, having won their 3rd title in the previous season. The campaign will begin on 4 September 2011, and end on 27 May 2012.

A total of 18 teams will contest the league, 16 of which already contested in the 2010–11 season and two of which were promoted from the Liga Nacional.

With ten wins in a row at the start of the season, Barcelona broke the Spanish women's starting record of Levante's nine wins in 2008/09. This streak was broken on matchday 15, when Barcelona drew Espanyol 3–3.

On the last match day, Barcelona secured their very first Spanish championship title.

== Changes from 2010–11 ==
- For this season, the league will use a double round-robin format, contrary to previous seasons were teams were divided in three regional groups of which the best placed teams progressed to a national group stage.
- The league was also reduced to 18 teams. Now, the bottom four placed teams will be relegated.
- The tie-breakers in place are with two teams tied: points in direct matches, goal difference in direct matches, goals scored in direct matches, goal difference in all matches, goals scored in all matches. If the tie can't be broken down, one or more play-off games are held at a neutral venue.

== Teams ==
=== Stadia and locations ===
Location of (qualified) teams in Primera Division 2011–12

Team	Home city	Stadium	Stadium capacity
Athletic Bilbao	Bilbao	Instalaciones Lezama	1,500
Atlético Madrid	Majadahonda	Cerro del Espino	3,500
Atlético Málaga	Málaga	José Gallardo	1,000
Barcelona	Barcelona	Ciutat Esportiva Joan Gamper	1,000
Collerense	Palma de Mallorca	Can Caimari	1,000
Espanyol	Cornellà de Llobregat	Ciudad Deportiva RCD Espanyol	1,500
Llanos de Olivenza	Olivenza	Ciudad Deportiva de Olivenza	1,000
El Olivo	Vigo	Monte da Mina	1,000
Levante	Valencia	Polideportiu Natzaret	1,000
Lagunak	Barañáin	Municipal Lagunak	1,000
L'Estartit	Torroella de Montgrí	Municipal de L'Estartit	1,500
Reocín	Puente San Miguel	Municipal Pepín Cadelo	1,000
Rayo Vallecano	Madrid	Ciudad Deportiva Rayo Vallecano	2,500
Prainsa Zaragoza	Zaragoza	Pedro Sancho	1,000
Real Sociedad	San Sebastián	Instalaciones Zubieta	2,500
Sant Gabriel	Sant Adrià de Besòs	Municipal José Luis Ruiz Casado	1,000
Sporting de Huelva	Huelva	Ciudad Deportiva El Conquero	1,000
Valencia	Valencia	Municipal de Beniferri	1,000

=== Personnel and sponsorship ===
Team	Chairman	Head coach	Captain	Kitmaker	Shirt sponsor
Athletic Bilbao	(Spain) Josu Urrutia	(Spain) Juan Luis Fuentes	(Spain) Iraia Iturregi	Umbro	Bizkaia
Atlético Madrid	(Spain) Lola Romero	(Spain) Juanjo Carretero	(Spain) Marta Docando	Nike	Qatar Foundation
Barcelona	(Spain) Sandro Rosell	(Spain) Xavier Llorens	(Spain) Ana Escribano	Nike	None
Levante	(Spain) Quico Catalán	(Spain) Antonio Contreras	(Spain) Maider Castillo	Luanvi	Valencia Terra i Mar
Valencia	(Spain) Manuel Llorente	(Argentina) Cristian Toro	(Spain) María Martí	Joma	Burger King

== League table ==
Pos	Team	Pld	W	D	L	GF	GA	GD	Pts	Qualification or relegation
1	Barcelona (C)	34	31	1	2	119	19	+100	94	Qualification for UEFA Champions League and Copa de la Reina
2	Athletic Bilbao	34	29	4	1	118	25	+93	91	Qualification Copa de la Reina
3	Espanyol	34	23	7	4	117	38	+79	76	Qualification Copa de la Reina
4	Rayo Vallecano	34	22	4	8	90	44	+46	70	Qualification Copa de la Reina
5	Levante	34	19	11	4	63	27	+36	68	
6	Atlético Madrid	34	20	5	9	83	41	+42	65	
7	Real Sociedad	34	19	5	10	58	35	+23	62	
8	Sporting Huelva	34	17	5	12	51	48	+3	56	
9	Prainsa Zaragoza	34	14	5	15	72	75	−3	47	
10	Sant Gabriel	34	11	4	19	55	67	−12	37	
11	Llanos de Olivenza	34	10	5	19	39	65	−26	35	
12	Collerense	34	9	6	19	54	91	−37	33	
13	Valencia	34	10	1	23	37	83	−46	31	
14	Lagunak	34	9	4	21	32	70	−38	31	
15	L'Estartit (R)	34	8	5	21	35	74	−39	29	Relegation to Segunda División
16	Atlético Málaga (R)	34	6	5	23	35	91	−56	23	Relegation to Segunda División
17	El Olivo (R)	34	5	4	25	43	112	−69	19	Relegation to Segunda División
18	Reocín (R)	34	2	3	29	30	126	−96	9	Relegation to Segunda División

Source: women.soccerway.com
Rules for classification: 1) points; 2) head-to-head points; 3) head-to-head goal difference; 4) head-to-head goals scored; 5) goal difference; 6) number of goals scored; 7) Fair-play points
(C) Champions; (R) Relegated

== Results ==
Home \ Away	ATH	ATM	MLG	FCB	CLL	EOV	ESP	LES	LAG	LEV	OLI	PRA	RAY	RSC	REO	SGB	SPH	VAL
Athletic Bilbao		4–1	9–0	3–1	3–1	2–0	4–1	5–1	3–0	3–1	6–0	4–1	3–1	7–2	6–0	2–0	1–1	2–1
Atlético Madrid	0–0		2–0	0–1	8–0	7–1	4–1	4–1	3–1	1–1	1–0	1–1	4–0	0–1	4–0	2–1	3–0	5–0
Atlético Málaga	0–7	1–2		0–3	2–2	5–2	0–5	4–1	3–0	0–3	0–1	1–2	1–3	1–1	1–1	3–2	1–4	0–1
Barcelona	1–0	4–0	8–0		3–1	6–2	6–0	1–0	7–0	3–2	2–0	5–1	3–2	2–0	6–0	3–0	1–0	8–0
Collerense	1–2	2–3	1–0	1–4		3–2	2–2	6–3	1–2	1–2	0–2	2–1	1–1	1–0	4–1	2–2	4–2	2–1
El Olivo	1–6	1–2	1–3	1–4	2–1		0–4	1–1	3–2	1–1	2–2	1–2	2–4	2–2	2–0	0–1	0–2	4–1
Espanyol	0–0	2–2	3–1	3–3	9–0	10–0		5–0	7–0	0–0	2–0	4–0	4–0	2–1	10–1	4–1	3–1	3–1
L'Estartit	1–2	0–5	2–0	0–3	0–1	2–1	1–3		0–0	0–4	1–0	1–1	2–1	0–1	2–0	1–1	0–3	3–1
Lagunak	0–3	1–2	1–0	0–2	3–1	3–1	2–5	2–1		2–2	1–0	0–1	0–3	0–1	2–1	2–1	0–2	0–1
Levante	1–1	1–0	2–1	0–2	5–0	3–1	0–1	2–2	1–0		1–1	2–1	1–1	2–0	4–0	3–0	2–0	3–1
Llanos Olivenza	2–8	0–3	3–1	0–4	3–2	3–1	1–1	3–1	4–0	0–0		1–2	1–3	0–2	2–0	1–3	0–2	1–0
Prainsa Zaragoza	1–2	2–6	4–0	0–4	7–1	3–1	1–1	4–0	2–2	2–2	3–1		2–3	1–3	8–4	2–1	3–1	4–0
Rayo Vallecano	2–3	4–3	1–0	3–2	1–1	10–1	1–3	2–0	2–1	0–1	3–1	6–1		2–0	3–0	5–1	5–0	5–0
Real Sociedad	1–3	2–1	5–0	0–4	2–1	4–0	2–1	0–1	1–0	1–1	2–1	5–0	0–1		3–0	3–0	0–0	5–0
Reocín	0–4	1–2	1–3	0–7	2–2	0–3	2–8	3–5	0–3	1–4	1–1	3–1	0–4	0–4		3–5	1–2	3–1
San Gabriel	1–3	1–1	5–0	0–1	3–1	7–1	0–3	3–2	0–0	0–2	3–0	3–7	0–3	0–1	4–0		2–0	0–3
Sporting Huelva	0–4	2–0	2–2	0–3	4–3	3–1	1–3	1–0	3–2	0–1	4–2	2–0	1–1	0–0	2–0	3–0		2–0
Valencia	1–3	4–1	1–1	0–2	4–2	3–1	0–4	1–0	3–0	0–3	0–2	2–1	1–4	1–3	4–1	0–4	0–1	

Source: women.soccerway.com
Legend: Blue = home team win; Yellow = draw; Red = away team win.

== Top scorers ==
Sonia of Barcelona won the top-scorer award with 38 goals.

Rank	Player	Team	Goals
1	(Spain) Sonia Bermúdez	Barcelona	38
2	(Spain) María Paz Vilas	Espanyol	36
3	(Spain) Natalia Pablos	Rayo Vallecano	26
4	(Spain) Adriana Martín	Atlético Madrid	25
5	(Spain) Erika Vázquez	Athletic Bilbao	24
5	(Spain) Patricia Mascaró	Collerense	24
7	(Spain) Olga García	Barcelona	23
7	(Spain) Ana Romero	Espanyol	23
9	(Equatorial Guinea) Jade Boho	Rayo Vallecano	19

== See also ==
- 2011–12 Segunda División (women)
- 2012 Copa de la Reina
