= 2013–14 Primera División (women) =

Primera División
- Season: 2013–14
- Champions: Barcelona; 3rd title
- Relegated: Granada; Levante Las Planas
- Matches: 240
- Goals: 710 (2.96 per match)
- Top goalscorer: Sonia Bermúdez (28 goals)
- Biggest home win: Barcelona 10–0 Granada
- Biggest away win: Real Sociedad 0-5 Barcelona; Alcaine Zaragoza 0-5 Athletic Bilbao
- Highest scoring: Barcelona 10–0 Granada; Athletic Bilbao 9-1 Levante Las Planas
- Longest winning run: Barcelona (8 matches)
- Longest unbeaten run: Barcelona (28 matches)
- Longest losing run: Levante Las Planas (6 matches)

The 2013–14 Primera División was the 26th edition of Spain's highest women's football league. Barcelona were the defending champions, having won their 2nd straight title in the previous season.

The competition, running from 15 September 2013 to 4 May 2014, was contested by 16 teams, with Granada and Oviedo Moderno as the newly promoted teams. Oviedo Moderno replaced Torrejón, which was disbanded days after attaining promotion.

== Teams ==
=== Stadia and locations ===
Location of (qualified) teams in Primera División 2013–14

Team	Home city	Stadium (capacity)	Budget
Athletic Bilbao	Bilbao	Lezama	€600,000
Atlético Madrid	Madrid	Miniestadio Cerro del Espino	€375,000
Barcelona	Barcelona	Ciutat Esportiva Joan Gamper	€800,000
Collerense	Palma de Mallorca	Poliesportiu Can Caimari (1,000)	€70,000
Espanyol	Barcelona	Ciudad Deportiva	€320,000
Granada	Granada	Campo Miguel Prieto	€70,000
Levante UD	Valencia	Polideportiu Nazaret	€300,000
Levante Las Planas	Sant Joan Despí	Municipal Les Planes	€55,000
Oviedo Moderno	Oviedo	Estadio Manuel Díaz Vega	€150,000
Rayo Vallecano	Madrid	Ciudad Deportiva	€150,000
Real Sociedad	San Sebastián	Instalaciones Zubieta	€600,000
Sant Gabriel	Sant Adrià de Besòs	Municipal José Luis Ruiz Casado	€300,000
Sevilla	Sevilla	Estadio Guadalquivir	€120,000
Sporting de Huelva	Huelva	Ciudad Deportiva El Conquero	€120,000
Transportes Alcaine	Zaragoza	Estadio Pedro Sancho	€250,000
Valencia	Valencia	Ciudad Deportiva de Paterna	€300,000

== League table ==
Pos	Team	Pld	W	D	L	GF	GA	GD	Pts	Qualification or relegation
1	Barcelona (C)	30	25	4	1	82	11	+71	79	Qualification for UEFA Champions League and Copa de la Reina
2	Athletic Bilbao	30	22	3	5	79	22	+57	69	Qualification Copa de la Reina
3	Atlético Madrid	30	16	6	8	72	35	+37	54	Qualification Copa de la Reina
4	Rayo Vallecano	30	14	9	7	45	30	+15	51	Qualification Copa de la Reina
5	Levante	30	14	9	7	38	29	+9	51	Qualification Copa de la Reina
6	Valencia	30	15	6	9	45	27	+18	51	Qualification Copa de la Reina
7	Real Sociedad	30	10	10	10	36	34	+2	40	Qualification Copa de la Reina
8	Sporting Huelva	30	11	7	12	41	42	−1	40	Qualification Copa de la Reina
9	Sant Gabriel	30	9	7	14	40	56	−16	34	
10	Collerense	30	10	4	16	45	62	−17	34	
11	Espanyol	30	8	8	14	37	51	−14	32	
12	Transportes Alcaine	30	8	7	15	29	55	−26	31	
13	Oviedo Moderno	30	6	12	12	30	41	−11	30	
14	Sevilla	30	7	5	18	23	61	−38	26	
15	Granada (R)	30	5	7	18	41	81	−40	22	Relegation to Segunda División
16	Levante Las Planas (R)	30	6	4	20	27	73	−46	22	Relegation to Segunda División

Source: soccerway.com
Rules for classification: 1) points; 2) head-to-head points; 3) goal difference; 4) number of goals scored
(C) Champions; (R) Relegated

== Results ==
Home \ Away	ALC	ATH	ATM	FCB	CLL	ESP	GRA	LEV	LLP	OVM	RAY	RSC	SGB	SEV	SPH	VAL
Transportes Alcaine		0–5	0–2	1–4	2–2	1–1	2–1	0–1	2–1	0–0	0–3	1–0	2–0	3–1	1–1	0–0
Athletic Bilbao	7–0		4–1	1–2	2–0	3–0	5–0	3–2	9–1	1–0	2–2	1–0	4–0	5–0	1–1	3–0
Atlético Madrid	5–2	2–1		0–3	5–1	1–0	5–0	1–1	5–0	6–1	2–0	2–1	4–0	7–0	5–2	1–1
Barcelona	2–1	1–0	2–1		5–0	4–0	10–0	1–0	4–0	4–1	2–0	2–2	5–1	4–0	3–0	1–0
Collerense	3–1	0–2	2–1	0–1		2–1	0–2	1–1	5–1	1–1	3–3	2–1	5–2	5–1	0–1	1–2
Espanyol	0–1	1–2	2–1	0–3	1–3		2–2	0–2	1–0	3–3	1–1	2–1	2–0	2–0	3–1	0–1
Granada	4–0	1–5	2–1	0–3	3–4	2–2		1–3	5–1	2–2	0–0	1–1	2–2	1–2	4–1	1–5
Levante	2–1	0–4	1–1	1–1	3–0	1–0	4–1		0–1	2–1	0–0	1–1	2–0	1–0	0–3	0–0
Levante Las Planas	2–0	0–1	0–3	0–3	2–3	2–2	2–1	0–1		2–1	0–1	2–2	2–0	1–1	2–4	0–2
Oviedo Moderno	0–0	0–0	2–2	0–0	3–0	2–1	2–2	0–1	2–0		0–0	2–0	0–0	1–0	1–2	0–3
Rayo Vallecano	1–0	3–1	0–0	0–1	3–0	2–3	2–1	2–1	6–1	2–1		2–0	1–3	3–1	1–1	2–1
Real Sociedad	0–3	1–2	3–2	0–5	1–0	3–0	3–0	1–1	1–1	1–1	1–1		2–0	1–0	2–0	0–0
San Gabriel	2–2	1–2	2–1	0–4	5–0	3–2	5–1	1–1	1–2	3–0	1–0	0–2		1–1	1–0	1–3
Sevilla	2–1	0–2	1–3	0–0	3–2	0–1	1–0	1–0	1–0	0–2	1–2	0–4	1–1		2–2	2–1
Sporting Huelva	0–2	0–1	1–1	2–1	1–0	2–2	4–0	1–2	3–0	1–0	2–1	0–1	2–2	2–0		1–2
Valencia	3–0	3–0	0–1	0–1	2–0	2–2	2–1	2–3	3–1	2–1	0–1	0–0	1–2	3–1	1–0	

Updated to match(es) played on 13 April 2014. Source: women.soccerway.com
Legend: Blue = home team win; Yellow = draw; Red = away team win.

== Season statistics ==
As of Week 30

=== Top scorers ===
Rank	Player	Club	Goals
1	Sonia Bermúdez	FC Barcelona	28
2	Noelia Aybar "Rivi"	Granada CF	23
3	Erika Vázquez	Athletic Bilbao	20
4	María Paz Vilas	Valencia CF	17
5	Amanda Sampedro	Atlético Madrid	16
6	Pilar Espadas	UD Collerense	14
6	Esther González	Atlético Madrid	14
8	Priscila Borja	Rayo Vallecano	13
8	Vanesa Gimbert	Athletic Bilbao	13
8	Bárbara Latorre	RCD Espanyol	13
8	Cristina Martín-Prieto	Sporting de Huelva	13
12	Jade Boho	Atlético Madrid	12
12	Nekane Díez	Athletic Bilbao	12
14	Maitane López	UD Collerense	11
15	Sandra García	Sporting de Huelva	10
15	Claudia Zornoza	Atlético Madrid	10

=== Hat-tricks ===
Player	For	Against	Result	Round
Claudia Zornoza	Atlético Madrid	Sevilla FC	7–0	1
Jade Boho	Atlético Madrid	Sevilla FC	7–0	1
Priscila Borja	Rayo Vallecano	FC Levante Las Planas	6-1	2
Sonia Bermúdez (5 goals)	FC Barcelona	Granada CF	10–0	3
Erika Vázquez	Athletic Club	CD Transportes Alcaine	0-5	6
Noelia Aybar "Rivi"	Granada CF	UD Collerense	3–4	8
Sonia Bermúdez	FC Barcelona	FC Levante Las Planas	0–3	8
Noelia Aybar "Rivi"	Granada CF	FC Levante Las Planas	5-1	15
Nekane Díez	Athletic Club	CD Transportes Alcaine	7-0	21
Sonia Bermúdez	FC Barcelona	FC Levante Las Planas	4–0	23
Esther González	Atlético Madrid	Sporting de Huelva	5–2	30

=== Best goalkeepers ===
Rank	Player	Club	Goals conceded	Minutes played	Coefficient
1	Laura Rafols	FC Barcelona	7	1890	1:270
2	Ainhoa Tirapu	Athletic Bilbao	16	1800	1:112.5
3	Mariajo Pons	Valencia CF	27	2700	1:100
4	Cristina Cornejo	Real Sociedad	20	1890	1:94.5
5	Sandra Paños	Levante UD	29	2700	1:93.1
6	Alicia Gómez	Rayo Vallecano	30	2700	1:90
7	Lola Gallardo	Atlético Madrid	29	2250	1:77.58

=== Fantastic Team ===

Fantastic team

== Transfers ==
Team	In	Out
Alcaine Zaragoza	(Catalonia) Esther Sullastres (GK, Barcelona) (Colombia) Natalia Gaitán (DF, Toledo Rockets) (Navarre) María Díaz Cirauqui (MF, Osasuna) (Catalonia) Alba Aznar (FW, Barcelona) (Navarre) Leyre Fernández (FW, CA Osasuna) (Colombia) Orianica Velásquez (FW, Indiana Hoosiers)	(Portugal) Jamila Martins (GK, Espanyol) (Aragon) Nelly Maestro (MF, Sant Gabriel) (Portugal) Cláudia Neto (MF, Espanyol) (Aragon) Bárbara Latorre (FW, Espanyol) (Aragon) Sara Sanáu (FW, ASA Avengers)
Athletic Bilbao	(Basque Country (autonomous community)) Vanesa Gimbert (DF, Espanyol)	(Basque Country (autonomous community)) Sandra García (DF) (Basque Country (autonomous community)) Aitziber Juaristi (DF, retirement) (Basque Country (autonomous community)) Patricia de la Sota (DF) (Basque Country (autonomous community)) Gurutze Fernández (FW, retirement)
Atlético Madrid	(Portugal) Ana Borges (MF, Santa Clarita Blue Heat) (Aragon) Silvia Meseguer (MF, Espanyol) (Equatorial Guinea) Jade Boho (FW, Rayo Vallecano) (Andalusia) Esther González (FW, Sporting Huelva)	(Community of Madrid) Raquel Carreño (DF, Rayo Vallecano) (Melilla) Vanesa García (DF, Rayo Vallecano) (Community of Madrid) Leticia Méndez (DF, Levante) (Japan) Mitsue Iwakura (MF, Valencia) (Valencian Community) Marieta López (MF, retirement) (Andalusia) Priscila Borja (FW, Rayo Vallecano) (Community of Madrid) Laura Ortiz (FW, Rayo Vallecano)
Barcelona	(England) Chelsea Ashurst (GK, Sporting Huelva) (Valencian Community) Ruth García (DF, Levante) (Catalonia) Esther Romero (DF, Sant Gabriel) (Catalonia) Marta Torrejón (DF, Espanyol) (Serbia) Jelena Čanković (MF, Spartak Subotica) (Andalusia) Ana "Willy" Romero (MF, Espanyol)	(Catalonia) Esther Sullastres (GK, Alcaine Zaragoza) (Catalonia) Ana María Escribano (DF, ÍBV Vestmannaeyja) (Balearic Islands) Melisa Nicolau (DF, retirement) (Catalonia) Leila Ouahabi (DF, Valencia) (Catalonia) Zaira Flores (MF, Levante Las Planas) (Catalonia) Laura Gutiérrez (MF, Levante) (Catalonia) Alba Aznar (FW, Alcaine Zaragoza) (Catalonia) Olga García (FW, Levante)
Collerense		
Espanyol	(Portugal) Jamila Martins (GK, Alcaine Zaragoza) (Catalonia) Júlia Rebollo (DF, Sant Gabriel) (Aragon) Bárbara Latorre (FW, Alcaine Zaragoza)	(Catalonia) María José Pons (GK, Valencia) (Basque Country (autonomous community)) Vanesa Gimbert (DF, Athletic Bilbao) (Aragon) Silvia Meseguer (MF, Atlético Madrid) (Galicia (Spain)) María Paz Vilas (FW, Valencia)
Granada	(Andalusia) Marta Martínez (MF, Zaidín 90) (Andalusia) Sara Montero (MF, Atlético Málaga) (Andalusia) Laura Pérez (FW, Ogíjares 89) (Castilla–La Mancha) Laura Requena (FW, Albacete)	(Andalusia) Nazaret Sánchez (MF) (Andalusia) Mamen Ramos (FW)
Levante	(Community of Madrid) Leticia Méndez (DF, Atlético Madrid) (Catalonia) Laura Gutiérrez (MF, Barcelona) (Catalonia) Olga García (FW, Barcelona)	(Valencian Community) Ruth García (DF, Barcelona) (Switzerland) Vanessa Bernauer (MF, Zürich) (Valencian Community) Sandra Castelló (MF, Sporting Huelva)
Levante Las Planas	(Catalonia) María Ripoll (GK, Barcelona B) (Catalonia) Ana Cobacho (DF, Cerdanyola) (Catalonia) Aida García (DF, Sant Gabriel) (Catalonia) María Ramos (DF, Barcelona B) (Catalonia) Elisabet Sivera (DF, Espanyol "B") (Catalonia) Zaira Flores (MF, Barcelona) (Catalonia) Alba Maestre (MF, Cerdanyola) (Navarre) Carolina Miranda (MF, Sant Gabriel) (Catalonia) Sara Serna (FW, Girona)	(Mexico) Pamela Tajonar (GK, Western New York Flash) (Catalonia) Cristina Becerra (DF, Espanyol) (Balearic Islands) Claudia Delgado (DF) (Andalusia) Alicia Fuentes (DF, Málaga CF) (Andalusia) Rocío López (DF, retirement) (Catalonia) Paula Nicart (DF, Sant Gabriel) (Balearic Islands) Isabel Calero (MF, Sant Gabriel) (Catalonia) Andrea Porta (MF, CE Europa) (Netherlands) Afra Walden (FW) (Catalonia) Sonia Zarza (FW, Espanyol)
Oviedo Moderno	(Asturias) Celia Arias (DF, Villa de Pravia) (Asturias) Isabel Álvarez (MF, Mareo)	(Asturias) Montserrat Tomé (DF, retirement) (Asturias) Saray García (MF) (Asturias) Alba Gordillo (MF) (Asturias) Yaiza Gutiérrez (MF) (Asturias) Eva Menéndez (MF) (Cantabria) Alba Señas (FW)
Rayo Vallecano	(Community of Madrid) Noelia Megías (GK, Torrejón) (Community of Madrid) Raquel Carreño (DF, Atlético Madrid) (Melilla) Vanesa García (DF, Atlético Madrid) (Navarre) Amaia Mendioroz (DF, Torrejón) (Community of Madrid) "Sole" Auñón (MF, Torrejón) (Community of Madrid) Laura Codonal (MF, Torrejón) (Brazil) Joyce Magalhaes (MF, Torrejón) (Andalusia) Priscila Borja (FW, Atlético Madrid) (Community of Madrid) Laura Ortiz (FW, Atlético Madrid)	(Community of Madrid) Patricia Gudiel (DF, Sant Gabriel) (Community of Madrid) Cristina Pizarro (MF, Sant Gabriel) (Castilla–La Mancha) Miriam Recuero (MF, Madrid CFF) (Community of Madrid) Keka Vega (MF, Bristol Academy) (Navarre) Uxue Astiz (FW, retirement) (Equatorial Guinea) Jade Boho (FW, Atlético Madrid) (Community of Madrid) Lucía Jiménez (FW) (Community of Madrid) Gabriela Morales (FW, Madrid CFF)
Real Sociedad	(Basque Country (autonomous community)) Leire Baños (MF, Oiartzun)	
Sant Gabriel	(Community of Madrid) Patricia Gudiel (DF, Rayo Vallecano) (Balearic Islands) Isabel Calero (MF, Levante Las Planas) (Aragon) Nelly Maestro (MF, Alcaine Zaragoza) (Community of Madrid) Cristina Pizarro (MF, Rayo Vallecano) (Catalonia) Brenda Pérez (FW, Espanyol) (Andalusia) Raquel Pinel (FW, Valencia)	(Catalonia) Berta Noguera (GK, retirement) (Catalonia) Aida García (DF, Levante Las Planas) (Catalonia) Júlia Rebollo (DF, Espanyol) (Catalonia) Georgina Carreras (MF, Valencia) (Catalonia) Alba Mena (MF) (Navarre) Carolina Miranda (MF, Levante Las Planas) (Catalonia) Esther Romero (MF, Barcelona) (Catalonia) Marta Cubí (FW, Cerdanyola) (Catalonia) Rocío Serrano (FW)
Sevilla	(Valencian Community) Claudia Barea (MF, Sporting Plaza de Argel)	(Andalusia) Patricia Gavira (DF, Sporting Huelva) (Valencian Community) Claudia Barea (MF, Hércules) (Andalusia) Virginia García (MF, Sporting Huelva) (Andalusia) Ángela Sosa (MF, Sporting Huelva)
Sporting Huelva	(Slovakia) Lucia El-Dahaibiová (GK, Slovan Duslo Šaľa) (Andalusia) Patricia Gavira (DF, Sevilla) (Valencian Community) Sandra Castelló (MF, Levante) (Andalusia) Virginia García (MF, Sevilla) (Andalusia) Ángela Sosa (MF, Sevilla) (Andalusia) Cristina Martín-Prieto (FW, Sevilla)	(England) Chelsea Ashurst (GK, Barcelona) (Andalusia) María Martín (DF) (Colombia) Lady Andrade (MF, PK-35 Vantaa) (Canary Islands) Silvia Doblado (MF, Granadilla) (Andalusia) Andrea Domínguez (MF) (Colombia) Paola Sánchez (MF) (Andalusia) Esther González (FW, Atlético Madrid) (Andalusia) Jenifer Morilla (FW)
Valencia	(Catalonia) María José Pons (GK, Espanyol) (Catalonia) Leila Ouahabi (DF, Barcelona) (Catalonia) Georgina Carreras (MF, Sant Gabriel) (Japan) Mitsue Iwakura (MF, Atlético Madrid) (Valencian Community) Sara Monforte (MF, Espanyol) (Galicia (Spain)) María Paz Vilas (FW, Espanyol)	(Valencian Community) Aroa Matarredona (GK, Marítim) (Valencian Community) Concepción Ricarte (DF, Marítim) (Andalusia) Sara Vicente (DF, Aldaia) (Valencian Community) Raquel Martínez (MF, Aldaia) (Austria) Katja Trödthandl (MF, Landhaus) (Andalusia) Raquel Pinel (FW, Sant Gabriel)

== See also ==
- 2013–14 Segunda División (women)
- 2014 Copa de la Reina de Fútbol
