= María Valenzuela (footballer) =

Spanish footballer (born 2002)

Personal information
- Full name: María López Valenzuela
- Date of birth: 26 November 2002 (age 23)
- Place of birth: Granada, Spain
- Height: 1.74 m (5 ft 9 in)
- Position: Goalkeeper

Team information
- Current team: FC Badalona
- Number: 1

Youth career
- 2017–2018: Granada

Senior career*
Years	Team	Apps	(Gls)
2018–2020	Granada	21	(0)
2020–2024	Levante	47	(0)
2024–	FC Badalona	38	(0)

International career^{‡}
2018–2019	Spain U17	7	(0)
2019	Spain U19	1	(0)
- * Club domestic league appearances and goals as of 11:16, 12 October 2021 (UTC) ‡ National team caps and goals as of 20:12, 27 September 2021 (UTC)

María López Valenzuela (born 26 November 2002) is a Spanish footballer who plays as a goalkeeper for FC Badalona.

== Club career ==
López Valenzuela started her senior career with Granada in her city of birth. She debuted for them at only 15 years of age.

== International career ==
Valenzuela has represented Spain at under-17 level and was in their squad for the 2018 U-17 World Cup. In February 2021, Valenzuela was called up to the Spain national team for the first time for their games against Azerbaijan and Poland. She did not play in either fixture.
