= Sílvia Tuyà =

Spanish fitness coach

Personal information
- Full name: Sílvia Tuyà Viñas
- Place of birth: Spain

Team information
- Current team: Manchester United (men's fitness coach)

Managerial career
- Years: Team
- 2018–2019: Badalona (fitness coach)
- 2024: Badalona (fitness coach)
- 2024–2026: United States (men's fitness coach)
- 2026–: Manchester United (men's fitness coach)

Sílvia Tuyà Viñas is a Spanish professional fitness coach who is a men's fitness coach of Manchester United.

== Career ==
In 2018, Tuyà was appointed as a fitness coach of Badalona, where she worked under Spanish manager Ferrán Cabello. Ahead of the 2024–25 season, she returned as a fitness coach of Badalona. The same year, she was appointed as a fitness coach of the United States men's national soccer team, becoming the first woman to be appointed on the team's coaching staff.

Following her stint there, she was appointed as a men's fitness coach of English Premier League side Manchester United during the autumn of 2026, becoming the first woman to be appointed on the men's team coaching staff. English newspaper The Standard wrote in 2026 that she "has experience in strength and conditioning athletes from other disciplines, such as tennis, rugby, basketball, and ironman competitors".

== Personal life ==
Tuyà was born in Spain and is a native of Catalonia, Spain and can speak English, Catalan and Spanish.
