= 2016–17 Segunda División (women) =

Segunda División
- Season: 2016–17
- Promoted: Sevilla; Madrid CFF
- Relegated: 18 teams

The 2016–17 Segunda División Femenina de Fútbol was the 2016–17 edition of the Spanish women's football second-tier league.

== Competition format ==
The Segunda División was divided into seven regional groups. Each group played their season as home and away round-robin format. At the end of the season, the lowest three teams from each regional group (except Group 6) were relegated to regional leagues. The seven group champions (for group 6, the winner of the Canarian final) qualified for the promotion playoffs.

In the promotion playoffs, the seven teams were divided by draw into two groups: one of four teams and other one of three. The group of four teams played a double-leg knockout format, while the group of three teams played with a double-legged round-robin format. The two group winners, Madrid CFF and Sevilla FC, were promoted to the Primera División.

== Group 1 ==
Pos	Team	Pld	W	D	L	GF	GA	GD	Pts	Qualification or relegation
1	Oviedo Moderno	26	22	4	0	108	9	+99	70	Qualification to promotion playoffs
2	Deportivo La Coruña	26	21	2	3	120	19	+101	65	
3	Sporting Gijón	26	17	2	7	75	36	+39	53	
4	Atlántida Matamá	26	16	4	6	62	29	+33	52	
5	Peluquería Mixta Friol	26	15	6	5	69	42	+27	51	
6	Ave Fénix Racing	26	15	2	9	90	57	+33	47	
7	Sárdoma	26	11	5	10	49	36	+13	38	
8	Victoria	26	10	4	12	51	55	−4	34	
9	Femiastur	26	7	5	14	55	67	−12	26	
10	Gijón	26	7	4	15	35	86	−51	25	
11	El Olivo (Note: Relegated due to the illegal alignment of a player during the whole season.) (R)	26	7	1	18	33	85	−52	22	Relegation to Regional leagues
12	Monte	26	6	3	17	41	72	−31	21	
13	Atlético Arousana (R)	26	3	2	21	28	120	−92	11	Relegation to Regional leagues
14	Tordoia (R)	26	2	2	22	23	126	−103	8	Relegation to Regional leagues

Source: Futbolme.com
Rules for classification: 1) points; 2) head-to-head points; 3) head-to-head goal difference; 4) goal difference; 5) number of goals scored.
(R) Relegated

== Group 2 ==
Pos	Team	Pld	W	D	L	GF	GA	GD	Pts	Qualification or relegation
1	Athletic Bilbao B	26	22	2	2	81	26	+55	68	
2	San Ignacio	26	18	2	6	62	34	+28	56	Qualification to promotion playoffs
3	Logroño	26	18	1	7	59	20	+39	55	
4	Mulier	26	14	1	11	42	31	+11	43	
5	Añorga	26	11	3	12	50	42	+8	36	
6	Eibar	26	10	6	10	33	40	−7	36	
7	Aurrerá Vitoria	26	10	4	12	52	51	+1	34	
8	Gasteizko Neskak	26	9	4	13	32	47	−15	31	
9	Pauldarrak	26	10	1	15	34	46	−12	31	
10	Ardoi	26	9	3	14	45	55	−10	30	
11	Nuestra Señora de Belén	26	8	4	14	28	54	−26	28	
12	Mariño (R)	26	7	5	14	18	40	−22	26	Relegation to Regional leagues
13	Arratia (R)	26	7	5	14	34	61	−27	26	Relegation to Regional leagues
14	Berriozar (R)	26	6	5	15	36	59	−23	23	Relegation to Regional leagues

Source: Futbolme.com
Rules for classification: 1) points; 2) head-to-head points; 3) head-to-head goal difference; 4) goal difference; 5) number of goals scored.
(R) Relegated

== Group 3 ==
Pos	Team	Pld	W	D	L	GF	GA	GD	Pts	Qualification or relegation
1	Barcelona B	26	19	3	4	79	23	+56	60	
2	Seagull	26	17	7	2	60	14	+46	58	Qualification to promotion playoffs
3	Espanyol B	26	16	3	7	41	33	+8	51	
4	Europa	26	13	9	4	48	35	+13	48	
5	Son Sardina	26	13	3	10	52	48	+4	42	
6	Collerense	26	12	2	12	49	46	+3	38	
7	AEM	26	11	4	11	37	37	0	37	
8	Sant Gabriel	26	11	4	11	44	37	+7	37	
9	Igualada	26	11	3	12	37	39	−2	36	
10	Pallejà	26	8	3	15	31	46	−15	27	
11	Levante Las Planas	26	7	5	14	34	59	−25	26	
12	L'Estartit (R)	26	7	5	14	46	49	−3	26	Relegation to Regional leagues
13	Sabadell (R)	26	7	5	14	38	57	−19	26	Relegation to Regional leagues
14	Porto Cristo (R)	26	1	2	23	22	95	−73	5	Relegation to Regional leagues

Source: Futbolme.com
Rules for classification: 1) points; 2) head-to-head points; 3) head-to-head goal difference; 4) goal difference; 5) number of goals scored.
(R) Relegated

== Group 4 ==
Pos	Team	Pld	W	D	L	GF	GA	GD	Pts	Qualification or relegation
1	Sevilla	26	24	1	1	121	16	+105	73	Qualification to promotion playoffs
2	Granada	26	22	4	0	126	18	+108	70	
3	Málaga	26	20	3	3	101	22	+79	63	
4	La Solana	26	14	6	6	61	23	+38	48	
5	Extremadura Femenino	26	13	3	10	73	51	+22	42	
6	El Naranjo	26	12	6	8	73	49	+24	42	
7	Cáceres	26	11	3	12	56	41	+15	36	
8	Sporting Huelva B	26	10	4	12	52	70	−18	34	
9	Santa Teresa B	26	10	4	12	34	42	−8	34	
10	La Rambla	26	8	2	16	33	88	−55	26	
11	Híspalis	26	6	5	15	28	69	−41	23	
12	Monachil (R)	26	5	2	19	31	96	−65	17	Relegation to Regional leagues
13	IES Luis de Camoens (R)	26	2	3	21	9	103	−94	9	Relegation to Regional leagues
14	Peña El Valle (R)	26	1	2	23	9	118	−109	5	Relegation to Regional leagues

Source: Futbolme.com
Rules for classification: 1) points; 2) head-to-head points; 3) head-to-head goal difference; 4) goal difference; 5) number of goals scored.
(R) Relegated

== Group 5 ==
Pos	Team	Pld	W	D	L	GF	GA	GD	Pts	Qualification or relegation
1	Madrid	26	24	1	1	140	18	+122	73	Qualification to promotion playoffs
2	Tacón	26	21	3	2	95	18	+77	66	
3	Atlético Madrid B	26	20	3	3	69	20	+49	63	
4	Parquesol	26	11	6	9	37	42	−5	39	
5	Dinamo Guadalajara	26	9	8	9	40	51	−11	35	
6	Olímpico	26	9	5	12	36	56	−20	32	
7	Rayo Vallecano B	26	7	10	9	24	29	−5	31	
8	Vallecas	26	9	4	13	48	76	−28	31	
9	Alhóndiga	26	7	7	12	35	54	−19	28	
10	Amigos del Duero	26	8	4	14	36	48	−12	28	
11	Pozuelo de Alarcón	26	8	3	15	30	57	−27	27	
12	San Pío X (R)	26	8	1	17	36	65	−29	25	Relegation to Regional leagues
13	Torrelodones (R)	26	5	6	15	24	51	−27	21	Relegation to Regional leagues
14	Guadamur (R)	26	3	5	18	25	90	−65	14	Relegation to Regional leagues

Source: Futbolme.com
Rules for classification: 1) points; 2) head-to-head points; 3) head-to-head goal difference; 4) goal difference; 5) number of goals scored.
(R) Relegated

== Group 6 ==
=== Las Palmas Group ===
Pos	Team	Pld	W	D	L	GF	GA	GD	Pts	Qualification or relegation
1	Femarguín	28	28	0	0	240	6	+234	84	Qualification to the Canarian final
2	Juan Grande	28	25	0	3	121	24	+97	75	
3	CFS La Garita	28	21	3	4	113	23	+90	66	
4	Unión Viera	28	21	2	5	188	20	+168	65	
5	Las Majoreras-Guayadeque	28	18	3	7	75	29	+46	57	
6	Aguiluchas	28	16	1	11	80	71	+9	49	
7	Flor de Lis Norte	28	13	4	11	83	62	+21	43	
8	Las Torres	28	12	3	13	53	58	−5	39	
9	Firgas	28	10	3	15	52	75	−23	33	
10	Achamán Santa Lucía	28	9	4	15	61	95	−34	31	
11	Montaña Alta	28	6	4	18	43	116	−73	22	
12	Las Coloradas	28	5	6	17	47	106	−59	21	
13	Yoñé La Garita	28	4	1	23	32	154	−122	13	
14	Iregui	28	3	3	22	31	128	−97	12	
15	Castillo	28	0	1	27	1	253	−252	1	

Source: Futbolme.com
Rules for classification: 1) points; 2) head-to-head points; 3) head-to-head goal difference; 4) goal difference; 5) number of goals scored.

=== Tenerife Group ===
Pos	Team	Pld	W	D	L	GF	GA	GD	Pts	Qualification or relegation
1	Granadilla B	24	20	1	3	131	18	+113	61	
2	San Juan Tenerife Norte	24	20	0	4	95	21	+74	60	Qualification to the Canarian final
3	Atlético Unión de Güímar	24	17	3	4	77	20	+57	54	
4	Tacuense B	24	16	4	4	65	28	+37	52	
5	Tarsa	24	17	0	7	60	18	+42	51	
6	Echedey Timbamba	24	9	4	11	53	58	−5	31	
7	Costa Adeje	24	8	3	13	40	68	−28	27	
8	Casablanca	24	7	4	13	44	70	−26	25	
9	Llano del Moro	24	7	4	13	37	51	−14	25	
10	Sanse	24	7	3	14	38	81	−43	24	
11	San Antonio Pilar	24	7	2	15	31	72	−41	23	
12	Laguna	24	5	3	16	38	63	−25	18	
13	Ofra (Note: Ofra disqualified due to two absences. All their matches from round 21 to the end finished 0–6 by following the competition rules.) (D)	24	0	1	23	9	150	−141	1	Disqualified

Source: Futbolme.com
Rules for classification: 1) points; 2) head-to-head points; 3) head-to-head goal difference; 4) goal difference; 5) number of goals scored.
(D) Disqualified

=== Canarian final ===
The winner of the Canarian final qualified to the promotion stage.

Team 1	Agg.	Team 2	1st leg	2nd leg
Femarguín	9–3	San Juan Tenerife Norte	5–0	4–3

== Group 7 ==
Pos	Team	Pld	W	D	L	GF	GA	GD	Pts	Qualification or relegation
1	Levante B	26	17	5	4	46	27	+19	56	
2	Valencia B	26	17	3	6	57	23	+34	54	
3	Sporting Plaza de Argel	26	16	4	6	67	23	+44	52	Qualification to promotion playoffs
4	Aldaia	26	16	3	7	36	21	+15	51	
5	Murcia Féminas	26	12	4	10	48	40	+8	40	
6	Villarreal	26	11	7	8	30	23	+7	40	
7	Mislata	26	11	4	11	35	33	+2	37	
8	Joventut Almassora	26	9	6	11	43	55	−12	33	
9	Alhama	26	9	5	12	23	32	−9	32	
10	CFF Albacete	26	8	5	13	26	41	−15	29	
11	Lorca FAD	26	7	6	13	35	48	−13	27	
12	Elche (R)	26	5	10	11	36	38	−2	25	Relegation to Regional leagues
13	Zaragoza CFF B (R)	26	3	9	14	24	42	−18	18	Relegation to Regional leagues
14	Ciudad de Benidorm (R)	26	4	3	19	19	79	−60	15	Relegation to Regional leagues

Source: Futbolme.com
Rules for classification: 1) points; 2) head-to-head points; 3) head-to-head goal difference; 4) goal difference; 5) number of goals scored.
(R) Relegated

== Promotion playoffs ==
The groups will be drawn on 8 May 2017, at the headquarters of the Royal Spanish Football Federation.

=== Four-team group ===
Semi-finals
Sevilla	4	3	7
San Ignacio	1	3	4
Oviedo Moderno	1	0	1
Femarguín	1	5	6

Final
Sevilla (a)	2	2	4
Femarguín	1	3	4

=== Three-team group ===
Pos	Team	Pld	W	D	L	GF	GA	GD	Pts	Promotion	MAD	SPA	SEA
1	Madrid CFF (P)	4	3	1	0	11	4	+7	10	Promotion to Primera División	—	4–0	2–1
2	Sporting Plaza de Argel	4	1	1	2	5	13	−8	4		2–2	—	3–1
3	Seagull	4	1	0	3	9	8	+1	3		1–3	6–0	—

Rules for classification: 1) points; 2) goal difference; 3) number of goals scored.
(P) Promoted
