= 2011–12 Segunda División (women) =

The 2011–12 Segunda División de Fútbol Femenino was the 21st edition of the second category of the Spanish women's football national championship. The competition was renamed, having been previously known as Primera Nacional, and a seventh group was created; the groups were rearranged and redistributed by regions as shown in the table below. The promotion play-offs were consequently expanded from six to eight teams, and held as two single-match rounds instead of two triangulars. Sevilla FC and FC Levante Las Planas were promoted after beating CD Femarguín and UD Tacuense in the final stage, held on May 26 – 27, 2012. The regular stage ran from September 24, 2011 to April 29, 2012.

Group	2010–11 season	2011–12 season
Group 1	(Aragon) Aragón (Basque Country (autonomous community)) Euskadi (Navarre) Navarra; La Rioja	Asturias (Castile and León) Castilla y León (I) (Galicia (Spain)) Galicia
Group 2	Asturias (Castile and León) Castilla y León (Galicia (Spain)) Galicia	(Basque Country (autonomous community)) Euskadi (Navarre) Navarra; La Rioja
Group 3	(Balearic Islands) Islas Baleares (Catalonia) Catalunya	(Aragon) Aragón (I) (Catalonia) Catalunya
Group 4	(Castilla–La Mancha) Castilla-La Mancha (Community of Madrid) Madrid (Region of Murcia) Murcia (Valencian Community) Comunidad Valenciana	(Andalusia) Andalucía; Ceuta (Extremadura) Extremadura
Group 5	(Andalusia) Andalucía; Ceuta; Extremadura	(Aragon) Aragón (II) (Castile and León) Castilla y León (II) (Community of Madrid) Madrid
Group 6	(Canary Islands) Islas Canarias	(Canary Islands) Islas Canarias
Group 7		(Balearic Islands) Islas Baleares (Castilla–La Mancha) Castilla-La Mancha; Region of Murcia (Valencian Community) Comunidad Valenciana

== Group 1 ==
=== Teams by autonomous community ===
Community	Teams
(Galicia (Spain)) Galicia	6: Atlético Arousana, SD Compostela, Erizana CF, Peluquería Mixta Friol, Orzán SD, Victoria CF
Asturias	4: Gijón FF, UD Llanera, EF Mareo, Oviedo Moderno CF
(Castile and León) Castilla y León	4: CD Amigos del Duero, León FF, CD Nuestra Señora de Belén, CD Ponferrada

=== Table ===
Pos	Team	Pld	W	D	L	GF	GF	Pts	PS	Q/R
1	Oviedo Moderno	26	25	0	1	116	7	75	New entry	Qualified for the promotion play-offs
2	Friol	26	18	5	3	45	26	59	▲5	
3	Ponferrada	26	16	2	8	67	38	50	▼1	
4	Mareo	26	14	5	7	50	25	47	▼1	
5	Erizana	26	12	5	9	41	44	41	▲7	
6	Atlético Arousana	26	10	8	8	38	46	38	New entry	
7	León	26	10	4	12	47	52	34	▲3	
8	Nuestra Señora de Belén	26	8	9	9	46	49	33	▼3	
9	SD Compostela	26	8	4	14	34	63	28	New entry	
10	Victoria	26	7	5	14	40	65	26	New entry	
11	Gijón	26	7	4	15	35	53	25	▼7	
12	Orzán	26	6	6	14	29	51	24	▼4	Relegated
13	Amigos del Duero	26	4	7	15	39	72	19	▼4	Relegated
14	Llanera	26	2	6	18	20	56	12	New entry	Relegated

== Group 2 ==
=== Teams by autonomous community ===
Community	Teams
(Basque Country (autonomous community)) Euskadi	10: Abanto Club, Añorga KKE, Athletic Bilbao B, CD Aurrerá de Vitoria, AD Berriotxoa, SD Eibar, Mondragón CF, Oiartzun KE, Pauldarrak EKT, SD San Ignacio
(Navarre) Navarra	3: CA Marcilla Aurora, CA Osasuna, AD San Juan
La Rioja	1: CA Revellín

=== Table ===
Pos	Team	Pld	W	D	L	GF	GF	Pts	PS	Q/R
1	Athletic Bilbao B	26	17	7	2	56	16	64	▲1	
2	Oiartzun	26	17	5	4	61	15	56	▲1	Qualified for the promotion play-offs
3	Abanto	26	15	5	6	41	24	50	▼2	
4	San Juan	26	13	9	4	43	21	48	▲1	
5	Añorga	26	12	7	7	59	43	43	▲1	
6	Osasuna	26	11	5	10	63	46	38	▼2	
7	Mondragón	26	10	6	10	50	33	36	New entry	
8	Pauldarrak	26	10	4	12	47	50	34	New entry	
9	San Ignacio	26	8	9	9	37	41	33	▼2	
10	Eibar	26	10	3	13	31	42	33	New entry	
11	Aurrerá	26	8	8	10	49	49	32	▼3	
12	Berriotxoa	26	8	7	11	35	46	31	▼2	Relegated
13	Revellín	26	3	5	18	24	71	14	New entry	Relegated
14	Marcilla Aurora	26	0	0	26	7	106	0	New entry	Relegated

== Group 3 ==
=== Teams by autonomous community ===
Community	Teams
(Catalonia) Catalunya	13: Atlètic Vilafranca, CF Badalona, FC Barcelona B, Cerdanyola del Vallés FC, RCD Espanyol B, CE Europa, Girona FC, Levante Las Planas, Lleida Esportiu, UE Sant Andreu, CE Sant Gabriel B, EF Valls, UE Vic
(Aragon) Aragón	1: Peñas Oscenses

=== Table ===
Pos	Team	Pld	W	D	L	GF	GF	Pts	PS	Q/R
1	Levante Las Planas	26	20	1	5	64	24	61	▲2	Qualified for the promotion play-offs
2	Valls	26	17	5	4	67	29	61	New entry	
3	Girona	26	14	7	5	54	21	49	▼1	
4	Barcelona B	26	15	4	7	51	32	49	▲1	
5	Vic	26	14	3	9	64	48	45	▲1	
6	Espanyol	26	12	6	8	42	31	42	▼5	
7	Lleida	26	12	4	10	46	42	40	▲1	
8	Cerdanyola	26	9	7	10	40	45	34	▲2	
9	Sant Gabriel B	26	9	3	14	50	49	30	▲2	
10	Sant Andreu	26	9	2	15	35	56	29	▼1	
11	Badalona	26	8	4	14	35	51	28	New entry	
12	Europa	26	6	6	14	39	47	24	▼5	Relegated
13	Atlètic Vilafranca	26	5	4	17	32	77	19	New entry	Relegated
14	Peñas Oscenses	26	3	2	21	18	85	11	New entry	Relegated

== Group 4 ==
=== Teams by autonomous community ===
Community	Teams
(Andalusia) Andalucía	10: CD Algaidas, Atlético Monachil, Granada CF, CD Híspalis, ADFB La Rambla, CF Mezquita, Séneca CF, Sevilla FC, AD Taraguilla, Triana CF
Extremadura	3: CFF Cáceres, Extremadura FCF, Santa Teresa CD
Ceuta	1: UD Carmelitas

=== Table ===
Pos	Team	Pld	W	D	L	GF	GF	Pts	PS	Q/R
1	Sevilla	26	22	2	2	121	12	68	New entry	Qualified for the promotion play-offs
2	Cáceres	26	18	3	5	92	35	57	▲3	
3	Granada	26	14	8	4	77	27	50	▲1	
4	Extremadura	26	15	4	7	68	41	49	▼2	
5	La Rambla	26	14	4	8	52	30	46	▲5	
6	Santa Teresa	26	12	6	8	46	41	42	New entry	
7	Carmelitas	26	11	6	9	43	37	39	New entry	
8	Algaidas	26	11	5	10	61	45	38	▼2	
9	Taraguilla	26	10	2	14	54	63	32	▼1	
10	Triana	26	8	7	11	47	54	31	▲1	
11	Mezquita	26	6	7	13	38	65	25	▼8	
12	Atlético Monachil	26	5	5	16	27	71	20	New entry	Relegated
13	Híspalis	26	5	1	20	34	87	16	▼4	Relegated
14	Séneca	26	0	2	24	5	169	2	New entry	Relegated

== Group 5 ==
=== Teams by autonomous community ===
Community	Teams
(Community of Madrid) Madrid	9: EMF Águilas Moratalaz, Atlético Madrid B, ED Moratalaz, CF Pozuelo de Alarcón, Rayo Vallecano B, CDAV San Nicasio, Talavera CF, AD Torrejón CF, Torrelodones CF
(Castile and León) Castilla y León	3: CD Navega, Polideportivo Caja Social Católica, Rayo Simancas
(Aragon) Aragón	2: UD Aragonesa, Prainsa Zaragoza B

=== Table ===
Pos	Team	Pld	W	D	L	GF	GF	Pts	PS	Q/R
1	Torrejón	26	21	3	2	94	28	66	New entry	Qualified for the promotion play-offs
2	Rayo Vallecano B	26	17	2	7	69	33	53	▼1	
3	Torrelodones	26	16	4	6	78	31	52	▲7	
4	Pozuelo	26	17	1	8	64	41	52	▲5	
5	Atlético Madrid B	26	16	2	8	82	34	50	▼1	
6	Águilas Moratalaz	26	13	5	8	61	42	44	New entry	
7	San Nicasio	26	10	5	11	48	51	35	New entry	
8	ED Moratalaz	26	10	4	12	41	57	34	New entry	
9	Prainsa Zaragoza B	26	10	2	14	46	54	32	Same position	
10	Caja Social Católica	26	8	6	12	49	58	30	New entry	
11	Rayo Simancas	26	7	5	14	35	65	26	New entry	
12	Navega	26	6	7	13	38	70	25	▼1	Relegated
13	Aragonesa	26	6	3	17	30	56	21	▼1	Relegated
14	Talavera	26	0	1	25	13	128	1	New entry	Relegated

== Group 6 ==
=== Teams by autonomous community ===
Community	Teams
(Canary Islands) Islas Canarias	10: CD Achamán, Atlético Perdoma, CD Charco del Pino, UJ Costa Ayala, CD Femarguín, CD Orientación Marítima, UD Tacuense, CD Tarsa, CF Unión Viera, UD Vallemar

=== Table ===
Pos	Team	Pld	W	D	L	GF	GF	Pts	PS	Q/R
1	Tacuense	18	17	1	0	76	17	52	Same position	Qualified for the promotion play-offs
2	Femargúin	18	12	4	2	54	25	40	Same position	Qualified for the promotion play-offs
3	Costa Ayala	18	10	3	5	52	41	33	▲7	
4	Charco del Pino	18	10	3	5	74	36	33	▼1	
5	Tarsa	26	7	5	6	18	30	26	▼1	
6	Orientación Marítima	18	7	3	8	39	38	24	▲1	
7	Achamán	18	5	3	9	28	39	18	▲2	
8	Unión Viera	18	4	3	11	24	45	15	Same position	
9	Atlético Perdoma	18	2	2	13	12	64	8	▼3	
10	Vallemar	18	0	3	15	13	71	3	▲2	

== Group 7 ==
=== Teams by autonomous community ===
Community	Teams
(Castilla–La Mancha) Castilla-La Mancha	5: Atlético Altobuey, Fundación Albacete, CFF Albacete, CD Bargas, CF La Solana
(Valencian Community) Comunidad Valenciana	5: UD Aspe, Hércules CF, CFF Marítim, Mislata CFF, Villarreal CF
(Balearic Islands) Islas Baleares	2: Sporting Atlètic Ciutat de Palma, RCD Mallorca
(Region of Murcia) Murcia	2: Lorca FAD, Real Murcia CF

=== Table ===
Pos	Team	Pld	W	D	L	GF	GF	Pts	PS	Q/R
1	Fundación Albacete	26	22	2	2	89	24	68	▲1	Qualified for the promotion play-offs
2	Ciutat de Palma	26	19	4	3	91	43	61	▲2	
3	CFF Albacete	26	16	4	6	63	35	52	Same position	
4	Marítim	26	16	2	8	60	28	50	▲4	
5	Villarreal	26	15	4	7	78	45	49	▲7	
6	Aspe	26	14	5	7	53	31	47	New entry	
7	La Solana	26	14	4	8	51	36	46	▼2	
8	Hércules	26	13	3	10	68	33	42	▼2	
9	Atlético Altobuey	26	8	7	11	44	48	31	▲2	
10	Real Murcia	26	9	4	13	41	44	61	▼3	
11	Mislata	26	5	4	17	38	59	19	New entry	
12	Lorca	26	3	2	21	19	96	11	New entry	Relegated
13	Bargas	26	2	2	22	22	103	8	New entry	Relegated
14	Mallorca	26	2	1	23	20	119	7	New entry	Relegated

== Promotion play-offs ==
=== First round ===
May 13, 2012
11:00

Femarguín	2 – 1	Oviedo Moderno
Ruano 25'; Jiménez 72'		Vallina 33'

Municipal, Arguineguín
Referee: Mederos
May 13, 2012
12:00

Oiartzun	0 – 2	Sevilla
		Gutiérrez 9'; Sosa 55'

Karla Lekuona, Oiartzun
Attendance: 700
Referee: Azpilikueta
May 13, 2012
13:00

Tacuense	2 – 1	Torrejón
Pérez 3'; Jéssica 85'		Morales 59'

Pablos Abril, San Cristóbal de la Laguna
Referee: Fernández Brito

May 13, 2012
17:00

Levante Las Planas	3 – 1	Fundación Albacete
Moreno 34'; Díez 56'; Walden 68'		Arranz 49'

Municipal de Les Planes, Sant Joan Despí
Referee: Blanco

=== Final Round ===
May 26, 2012
20:00

Sevilla	3 – 1	Femarguín
Parra 18'; Sosa 67', 89'		Ruano 33'

José Ramón Cisneros, Sevilla
Referee: Fernández Delgado

Sevilla FC is promoted to the 2012-13 Primera División

May 27, 2012
11:00

Levante Las Planas	2 – 1 A.E.T.	Tacuense
Acedo 51', 94'		Pérez 1'

Municipal de Les Planes, Sant Joan Despí
Referee: Martínez Sáez

FC Levante Las Planas is promoted to the 2012-13 Primera División
