= Ana Buceta =

Spanish footballer (born 1992)

Personal information
- Full name: Ana Buceta Rodríguez
- Date of birth: 4 December 1992 (age 33)
- Place of birth: Moaña, Spain
- Height: 1.67 m (5 ft 6 in)
- Position: Midfielder

Team information
- Current team: Málaga

Youth career
- 2002–2006: Moaña
- 2006–2008: Bértola

Senior career*
Years	Team	Apps	(Gls)
2008–2012	El Olivo		
2012–2019	Levante	62	(15)
2019–	Málaga	0	(0)

International career^{‡}
2007	Galicia	1	(0)
- * Club domestic league appearances and goals as of 5 May 2019 ‡ National team caps and goals as of 19:34, 18 September 2020 (UTC)

Ana Buceta Rodríguez (born 4 December 1992) is a Spanish footballer who plays as a midfielder for Segunda División Pro club Málaga CF. Previously she played for FVPR El Olivo.

As a member of the Spain Under-19 team she has played the 2010 and 2011 UEFA U-19 European Championships.
