= Nazareth Martín =

Spanish footballer (born 2004)

Personal information
- Full name: Nazareth Martín Vázquez
- Date of birth: 26 February 2004 (age 22)
- Place of birth: Seville, Spain
- Height: 1.78 m (5 ft 10 in)
- Position: Defender

Team information
- Current team: Sevilla

Senior career*
Years	Team	Apps	(Gls)
2019–	Sevilla	43	(2)
2025–2026	-> Valencia (on loan)	25	(3)
- * Club domestic league appearances and goals as of 16:54, 14 December 2021 (UTC)

Nazareth Martín Vázquez (born 26 February 2004) is a Spanish footballer who plays as a defender for Sevilla.

== Club career ==
Martín started her career at Sevilla.
