= Eva Llamas =

Spanish footballer (born 1992)

Personal information
- Full name: Eva Llamas Hernández
- Date of birth: 29 May 1992 (age 34)
- Place of birth: Badalona, Spain,
- Height: 1.70 m (5 ft 7 in)
- Position: Defender

Team information
- Current team: Sevilla FC
- Number: 5

Senior career*
Years	Team	Apps	(Gls)
2010–2015	Sant Gabriel		
2015–2020	Granadilla	108	(5)
2020–2022	Real Betis	30	(1)
2022–	Sevilla FC	55	(3)

International career
2016–	Catalonia	3	(1)
- * Club domestic league appearances and goals as of 13:40, 30 November 2021 (UTC)

Eva Llamas Hernández (born 29 May 1992) is a Spanish footballer who plays as a defender for Liga F club Sevilla FC.
