= Granada CF (women) =

Spanish football club

Granada CF Femenino
- Full name: Granada Club de Fútbol Femenino
- Nicknames: Nazaríes; El Graná
- Founded: 2003; 23 years ago
- Stadium: Campo Miguel Prieto
- Owner: Daxian 2009, S.L.
- President: Sophia Yang
- Head coach: Irene Ferreras
- League: Liga F
- 2025–26: 6th
- Website: granadacf.es/femenino
| Home colours | Away colours | Third colours |

Granada Club de Fútbol Femenino is a Spanish women's football club from Granada founded in 2003. It is the women's section of Granada CF.

In 2013 it was promoted to the top Spanish league for the first time. It was relegated the next year. They were promoted again in 2022–23.

== Competition record ==
| Season | Div. | Pos. | Copa de la Reina |
|---|---|---|---|
| 2004–05 | 2ª (Gr. 5) | 2nd | |
| 2005–06 | 2ª (Gr. 5) | 2nd | |
| 2006–07 | 2ª (Gr. 5) | 6th | |
| 2007–08 | 2ª (Gr. 5) | 2nd | |
| 2008–09 | 2ª (Gr. 5) | 4th | |
| 2009–10 | 2ª (Gr. 5) | 8th | |
| 2010–11 | 2ª (Gr. 5) | 4th | |
| 2011–12 | 2ª (Gr. 4) | 3rd | |
| 2012–13 | 2ª (Gr. 4) | 1st | |
| 2013–14 | 1ª | 15th | |
| 2014–15 | 2ª (Gr. 4) | 3rd | |
| 2015–16 | 2ª (Gr. 4) | 2nd | |
| 2016–17 | 2ª (Gr. 4) | 2nd | |
| 2017–18 | 2ª (Gr. 4) | 2nd | |
| 2018–19 | 2ª (Gr. 4) | 2nd (Note: The team qualified to move up to the new Primera División B but remained in the second tier of the system due to its creation.) | |
| 2019–20 | 2ªP (Gr. S) | 2nd | |
| 2020–21 | 2ªP (Gr. SA) | 2nd (Note: In 1 of 4 regionalised Autumn subgroups.)/3rd (Note: in 1 of 2 regionalised 'promotion/retention' Spring subgroups.) | |
| 2021–22 | 2ªP (Gr. S) | 3rd | Third round |
| 2022–23 | 1ª Fed | 5th | Quarter-final |
| 2023-24 | Liga F | 14th | |
| 2024-25 | Liga F | 5th | Semi-final |
| 2025-26 | Liga F | 6th | Round of 16 |

== Current squad ==
As of 10 August 2026

Note: Flags indicate national team as defined under FIFA eligibility rules; some limited exceptions apply. Players may hold more than one non-FIFA nationality.

| No. | Pos. | Nation | Player |
|---|---|---|---|
| 1 | GK | ESP | Laura Sánchez Comuñas |
| 14 | FW | JPN | Miku Kojima |
| 17 | DF | ESP | Blanca Muñoz |
| 20 | DF | BRA | Jujuba |
| 21 | DF | ESP | Postigo |
| 22 | MF | ESP | Leles |

| No. | Pos. | Nation | Player |
|---|---|---|---|
| 27 | DF | ESP | Ángela Mateos |
| 28 | MF | ESP | Vera Molina |
| 29 | FW | ESP | Ana Martos |
| 30 | FW | GHA | Success Ameyaa |
| 31 | GK | ESP | Alba Ibañez |
| 34 | FW | ESP | Mireya Zafra |
| — | FW | ESP | Barbara López (on loan from Madrid CFF) |
