= FCF Atlético Jiennense =

Spanish football club

Atlético Jiennense
- Full name: Fútbol Club Femenino Atlético Jiennense
- Ground: Antoñete, Jaén
- Manager: Aurelio Cabello
- League: Primera Provincial Andaluza
- 2011-12: Jaén Division, Group 1, 4th
Home colours

Fútbol Club Femenino Atlético Jiennense is a Spanish football club from Jaén, currently playing in third-tier Primera Provincial Andaluza.

Jiennense played in second-tier Primera Nacional through the 2000s, usually ranking in the top half of the table. In 2009 it topped its group, but it lost to Oviedo Moderno CF in the promotion play-offs. However, the 2009-10 Superliga was expanded with clubs from the male leagues, and Real Jaén CF chose Atlético Jiennense to represent it in the top category. In its debut season as Real Jaén Femenino the team was second to last in the overall table with 3 wins and 2 draws in 24 games.

By the end of the season Real Jaén was in peril of bankruptcy, and it decided to withdraw from women's football. The team's trip to L'Estartit for its last match in the top flight was covered by a RTVE documentary focusing on the status of women's football in Spain. Real Jaén's withdrawal was a heavy blow for Jiennense, which was dropped to the third tier. Most recently it played the promotion play-offs to 2012-13 Segunda División, as it is now called Primera Nacional, but it lost to AD El Naranjo.

== Former internationals ==
- Spain: Alharilla Casado, Celia Jiménez
