= UD Collerense (women) =

Spanish football team

- Full name: Unión Deportiva Collerense (women)
- Nickname: Colle
- Founded: 1999
- Ground: Estadi Municipal Coll d’en Rebassa
- Capacity: 1,000
- Chairman: Josep Maria Forteza
- Manager: José Antonio Sánchez Ros
- League: Segunda División Pro
- 2019–20: Segunda División Pro, 16th (Group South)
Home colours	Away colours	Third colours

UD Collerense is the women's football section of UD Collerense. The club is located in Palma de Mallorca (Balearic Islands, Spain).

== History ==
The team was created in 1999. Starting in the third tier, in 2002 it reached the second category where it played for the seven next seasons, usually ranking in its group's top positions.

In the 2008-09 season Collerense won all 26 matches, qualifying for the first time for the promotion play-offs six weeks before the end of the regular season. In the play-offs the team defeated Oiartzun KE (4–1) and UD Tacuense (1–0) to become the first Balearic team to play in the league's top level.

In its first two seasons in the Superliga, which coincided with a reform in the competition's system, Collerense was respectively 5th and 6th in the first stage's group B and 2nd in the second's stage group C, qualifying both times for the national cup, where it was knocked out in the first round by FC Barcelona (2–1, 0–2) and Atlético Madrid (0–1, 1–3) respectively. Following the league's reunification the team was 14th in the 2011–12 season, with a 4 points advantage over relegation positions.

The reserve team currently plays in the third tier after being relegated in 2011.

== Titles ==
- Promotion to the Superliga Femenina: 2008-09
- Primera Nacional (T2)
  - Winners 2008-09: 1
  - Runners-up 2003-04, 2004–05, 2005–06, 2007-08: 4
- Regional (T3)
  - Winners 2001–02: 1

=== Season to season ===
Season	Tier	Division	Place	Copa de la Reina
1999/00	3	Regional	6th	
2000/01	3	Regional	3rd	
2001/02	3	Regional	1st	
2002/03	2	2ª (G3)	3rd	
2003/04	2	2ª (G3)	2nd	
2004/05	2	2ª (G3)	2nd	
2005/06	2	2ª (G3)	2nd	
2006/07	2	2ª (G3)	7th	
2007/08	2	2ª (G3)	2nd	
2008/09	2	2ª (G3)	1st	
2009/10	1	1ª	12th	First round
2010/11	1	1ª	11th	First round
2011/12	1	1ª	12th	
2012/13	1	1ª	14th	
2013/14	1	1ª	10th	
2014/15	1	1ª	12th	
2015/16	1	1ª	16th	
2016/17	2	2ª (G3)	6th	
2017/18	2	2ª (G3)	3rd	
2018/19	2	2ª (G3)	5th (Note: The team qualified to move up to the new Segunda División Pro but remained in the second tier of the system due to its creation.)	
2019/20	2	2ªP	16th	
2020/21	2	2ªP		

== Current squad ==
As of 20 July 2020

Note: Flags indicate national team as defined under FIFA eligibility rules; some limited exceptions apply. Players may hold more than one non-FIFA nationality.

No.	Pos.	Nation	Player
3	DF	ESP	Marga Morey
4	DF	ESP	Andrea Alcaide
6	MF	COL	Marcela Restrepo
7	FW	ESP	Gabi
9	MF	ESP	Rocío García
10	FW	ESP	Pili Espadas (C)
12	DF	ESP	Vivien
14	DF	ESP	Cora
15	MF	USA	Katie Rivers
—	GK	ESP	Laura Girol

No.	Pos.	Nation	Player
—	GK	ECU	Andrea Vera
—	DF	ESP	Silvia Peñalver
—	MF	ESP	Paula Rojas
—	DF	ARG	Adriana Sachs
—	MF	ESP	Nati Cano
—	MF	ESP	María Hernández
—	MF	ESP	Marta Hernández
—	MF	ESP	Sofía Rojas
—	FW	ARG	Belén Spenig
