= Marina Keller =

Swiss footballer (born 1984)

Personal information
- Full name: Marina Keller
- Date of birth: 23 February 1984 (age 42)
- Place of birth: Richterswil, Zürich, Switzerland
- Height: 1.68 m (5 ft 6 in)
- Position: Defender

Team information
- Current team: Sant Gabriel

Senior career*
Years	Team	Apps	(Gls)
2000–2010	Grasshopper		
2010–2011	Levante	22	(1)
2011–2012	Sant Gabriel	25	(1)
2012–	Zürich		

International career
- Switzerland U19
2007–	Switzerland	41	(0)
- * Club domestic league appearances and goals

Marina Keller is a Swiss football player currently playing as a defender for FC Zürich in the Nationalliga A.

She started her career in 2000 in FFC Schwerzenbach, later absorbed by Grasshopper Club, where she spent ten years. In 2008, she was named the years best Swiss player. In 2010, she moved to Spain to play for Levante UD, and the next year she played in CE Sant Gabriel. In 2012, she returned to Switzerland, signing for Grasshopper's rival FC Zürich. She debuted in the UEFA Champions League with Zürich in August that year.

She is a member of the Swiss national team since 2007.
