= 2015–16 Segunda División (women) =

Segunda División
- Season: 2015–16
- Promoted: Real Betis; UD Tacuense

The 2015–16 Segunda División Femenina de Fútbol will be the 2015–16 edition of Spain's women's football second league.

== Competition format ==
The champion of each group and the best runner-up will qualify to the promotion play-offs. For the group 6, composed by teams from the Canary Islands, the two best teams of each sub-group will join a previous playoff where the champion will be the eighth team qualified.

Only two teams will promote to Primera División.

== Group 1 ==
| Pos | Team | Pld | W | D | L | GF | GA | GD | Pts | Qualification or relegation |
|---|---|---|---|---|---|---|---|---|---|---|
| 1 | FVPR El Olivo | 24 | 21 | 2 | 1 | 113 | 18 | +95 | 65 | Qualification for promotion play-off |
| 2 | Peluquería Mixta Friol | 24 | 19 | 1 | 4 | 99 | 35 | +64 | 58 | runner-up |
| 3 | Sárdoma CF | 24 | 13 | 7 | 4 | 50 | 28 | +22 | 46 | |
| 4 | Atlético Arousana | 24 | 13 | 3 | 8 | 74 | 63 | +11 | 42 | |
| 5 | EF Mareo | 24 | 13 | 1 | 10 | 56 | 49 | +7 | 40 | |
| 6 | CDE Ave Fénix Racing | 24 | 11 | 5 | 8 | 55 | 49 | +6 | 38 | |
| 7 | Victoria CF | 24 | 11 | 1 | 12 | 67 | 54 | +13 | 34 | |
| 8 | Orzán SD | 24 | 9 | 6 | 9 | 42 | 32 | +10 | 33 | |
| 9 | CD Femiastur | 24 | 7 | 8 | 9 | 35 | 39 | −4 | 29 | |
| 10 | CD Amigos del Duero | 24 | 7 | 6 | 11 | 36 | 46 | −10 | 27 | |
| 11 | Tordoia CF | 24 | 6 | 1 | 17 | 27 | 84 | −57 | 19 | |
| 12 | SCD Milagrosa | 24 | 4 | 3 | 17 | 25 | 54 | −29 | 15 | Relegation to Regional leagues |
| 13 | Erizana CF | 24 | 0 | 0 | 24 | 10 | 138 | −128 | 0 | Relegation to Regional leagues |

== Group 2 ==
| Pos | Team | Pld | W | D | L | GF | GA | GD | Pts | Qualification or relegation |
|---|---|---|---|---|---|---|---|---|---|---|
| 1 | EDF Logroño | 26 | 23 | 3 | 0 | 77 | 16 | +61 | 72 | Qualification for promotion play-off |
| 2 | Mulier FCN | 26 | 20 | 2 | 4 | 81 | 38 | +43 | 62 | runner-up |
| 3 | Athletic Club B | 26 | 19 | 2 | 5 | 74 | 30 | +44 | 59 | |
| 4 | Añorga KKE | 26 | 16 | 4 | 6 | 69 | 44 | +25 | 52 | |
| 5 | CF Ardoi FE | 26 | 13 | 5 | 8 | 53 | 35 | +18 | 44 | |
| 6 | CD Aurrerá de Vitoria | 26 | 11 | 4 | 11 | 62 | 53 | +9 | 37 | |
| 7 | CD Nuestra Señora de Belén | 26 | 8 | 5 | 13 | 31 | 68 | −37 | 29 | |
| 8 | SD San Ignacio | 26 | 7 | 8 | 11 | 31 | 36 | −5 | 29 | |
| 9 | CD Mariño | 26 | 6 | 9 | 11 | 35 | 39 | −4 | 27 | |
| 10 | SD Eibar | 26 | 7 | 6 | 13 | 46 | 42 | +4 | 27 | |
| 11 | Pauldarrak EFKT | 26 | 6 | 5 | 15 | 40 | 69 | −29 | 23 | |
| 12 | CD Peñas Oscenses | 26 | 7 | 1 | 18 | 37 | 89 | −52 | 22 | Relegation to Regional leagues |
| 13 | Leioako ESFKE | 26 | 4 | 5 | 17 | 28 | 71 | −43 | 17 | Relegation to Regional leagues |
| 14 | Capiscol CF | 26 | 4 | 3 | 19 | 24 | 58 | −34 | 15 | Relegation to Regional leagues |

== Group 3 ==
| Pos | Team | Pld | W | D | L | GF | GA | GD | Pts | Qualification or relegation |
|---|---|---|---|---|---|---|---|---|---|---|
| 1 | FC Barcelona B | 26 | 23 | 3 | 0 | 104 | 11 | +93 | 72 | |
| 2 | CE Seagull | 26 | 20 | 2 | 4 | 58 | 27 | +31 | 62 | Qualification for promotion play-off |
| 3 | FC Levante Las Planas | 26 | 16 | 6 | 4 | 77 | 32 | +45 | 54 | runner-up |
| 4 | UE L'Estartit | 26 | 15 | 3 | 8 | 62 | 51 | +11 | 48 | |
| 5 | CE Europa | 26 | 13 | 3 | 10 | 45 | 43 | +2 | 42 | |
| 6 | CF Igualada | 26 | 12 | 4 | 10 | 42 | 41 | +1 | 40 | |
| 7 | AD Son Sardina | 26 | 10 | 6 | 10 | 51 | 58 | −7 | 36 | |
| 8 | SE AEM | 26 | 9 | 6 | 11 | 45 | 49 | −4 | 33 | |
| 9 | CE Sant Gabriel | 26 | 8 | 7 | 11 | 43 | 57 | −14 | 31 | |
| 10 | RCD Espanyol B | 26 | 8 | 6 | 12 | 35 | 40 | −5 | 30 | |
| 11 | CF Pallejà | 26 | 7 | 7 | 12 | 26 | 50 | −24 | 28 | |
| 12 | CF La Roca Penya Blanc Blava | 26 | 6 | 1 | 19 | 31 | 68 | −37 | 19 | Relegation to Regional leagues |
| 13 | Cerdanyola del Vallès FC | 26 | 4 | 5 | 17 | 32 | 63 | −31 | 17 | Relegation to Regional leagues |
| 14 | UD Collerense B | 26 | 1 | 2 | 23 | 10 | 71 | −61 | 5 | Relegation to Regional leagues |

== Group 4 ==
| Pos | Team | Pld | W | D | L | GF | GA | GD | Pts | Qualification or relegation |
|---|---|---|---|---|---|---|---|---|---|---|
| 1 | Real Betis | 26 | 23 | 3 | 0 | 132 | 5 | +127 | 72 | Qualification for promotion play-off |
| 2 | Granada CF | 26 | 21 | 2 | 3 | 116 | 19 | +97 | 65 | runner-up |
| 3 | Sevilla FC | 26 | 19 | 6 | 1 | 108 | 17 | +91 | 63 | |
| 4 | Atlético Málaga | 26 | 18 | 4 | 4 | 89 | 24 | +65 | 58 | |
| 5 | Sporting de Huelva B | 26 | 14 | 3 | 9 | 60 | 65 | −5 | 45 | |
| 6 | CFF Cáceres | 26 | 12 | 3 | 11 | 52 | 53 | −1 | 39 | |
| 7 | AD El Naranjo | 26 | 10 | 4 | 12 | 55 | 71 | −16 | 34 | |
| 8 | CFF Badajoz Olivenza | 26 | 9 | 4 | 13 | 43 | 50 | −7 | 31 | |
| 9 | Extremadura Femenino CF | 26 | 9 | 3 | 14 | 48 | 48 | 0 | 30 | |
| 10 | CD Híspalis | 26 | 8 | 4 | 14 | 41 | 63 | −22 | 28 | |
| 11 | ADFB La Rambla | 26 | 6 | 3 | 17 | 36 | 89 | −53 | 21 | |
| 12 | CD Ciconia Negra | 26 | 5 | 2 | 19 | 25 | 95 | −70 | 17 | Relegation to Regional leagues |
| 13 | Algaidas CD | 26 | 2 | 4 | 20 | 19 | 113 | −94 | 10 | Relegation to Regional leagues |
| 14 | UD La Cruz Villanovense | 26 | 1 | 5 | 20 | 31 | 143 | −112 | 8 | Relegation to Regional leagues |

== Group 5 ==
| Pos | Team | Pld | W | D | L | GF | GA | GD | Pts | Qualification or relegation |
|---|---|---|---|---|---|---|---|---|---|---|
| 1 | Atlético de Madrid B | 26 | 20 | 5 | 1 | 66 | 16 | +50 | 65 | |
| 2 | Madrid CFF | 26 | 18 | 6 | 2 | 82 | 24 | +58 | 60 | Qualification for promotion play-off |
| 3 | CD Canillas | 26 | 16 | 3 | 7 | 44 | 27 | +17 | 51 | runner-up |
| 4 | Dinamo Guadalajara | 26 | 16 | 2 | 8 | 46 | 34 | +12 | 50 | |
| 5 | FF La Solana | 26 | 16 | 1 | 9 | 43 | 29 | +14 | 49 | |
| 6 | AD Alhóndiga | 26 | 12 | 6 | 8 | 53 | 32 | +21 | 42 | |
| 7 | Rayo Vallecano B | 26 | 10 | 3 | 13 | 31 | 43 | −12 | 33 | |
| 8 | Torrelodones CF | 26 | 9 | 5 | 12 | 32 | 45 | −13 | 32 | |
| 9 | CD Parquesol | 26 | 9 | 4 | 13 | 38 | 40 | −2 | 31 | |
| 10 | Olímpico de Moratalaz EF | 26 | 9 | 3 | 14 | 35 | 33 | +2 | 30 | |
| 11 | CF Pozuelo de Alarcón | 26 | 8 | 5 | 13 | 39 | 49 | −10 | 29 | |
| 12 | Casa Social Católica de Ávila | 26 | 8 | 4 | 14 | 30 | 55 | −25 | 28 | Relegation to Regional leagues |
| 13 | CFF Sur Getafe | 26 | 4 | 1 | 21 | 25 | 84 | −59 | 13 | Relegation to Regional leagues |
| 14 | CD Salamanca FF | 26 | 2 | 2 | 22 | 24 | 77 | −53 | 8 | Relegation to Regional leagues |

== Group 6 ==
=== group 6.1 ===
| Pos | Team | Pld | W | D | L | GF | GA | GD | Pts | Qualification |
|---|---|---|---|---|---|---|---|---|---|---|
| 1 | CD Femarguín | 26 | 24 | 1 | 1 | 193 | 13 | +180 | 73 | Qualification for title play-off |
| 2 | CD Achamán Santa Lucía | 26 | 22 | 3 | 1 | 178 | 18 | +160 | 69 | Qualification for title play-off |
| 3 | CF Unión Viera | 26 | 21 | 0 | 5 | 127 | 19 | +108 | 63 | |
| 4 | CD Aguiluchas | 25 | 20 | 0 | 5 | 94 | 20 | +74 | 60 | |
| 5 | CF Las Majoreras-Guayadeque | 26 | 14 | 4 | 8 | 64 | 49 | +15 | 46 | |
| 6 | UD Las Coloradas | 26 | 13 | 3 | 10 | 56 | 69 | −13 | 42 | |
| 7 | UD Las Torres | 26 | 11 | 6 | 9 | 54 | 57 | −3 | 39 | |
| 8 | CF Flor de Lis Norte | 26 | 8 | 8 | 10 | 43 | 49 | −6 | 32 | |
| 9 | UD Montaña Alta | 26 | 7 | 3 | 16 | 26 | 79 | −53 | 24 | |
| 10 | CD Tagoror Yady Fernández | 26 | 7 | 0 | 19 | 36 | 131 | −95 | 21 | |
| 11 | CD Yoñé La Garita | 26 | 5 | 4 | 17 | 29 | 111 | −82 | 19 | |
| 12 | CD Firgas | 26 | 6 | 0 | 20 | 27 | 98 | −71 | 18 | |
| 13 | Cinco Continentes LP CF | 26 | 2 | 4 | 20 | 15 | 108 | −93 | 10 | |
| 14 | CD Villa de Agaete Vida Sana | 26 | 3 | 1 | 22 | 34 | 155 | −121 | 10 | |

=== group 6.2 ===
| Pos | Team | Pld | W | D | L | GF | GA | GD | Pts | Qualification or relegation |
|---|---|---|---|---|---|---|---|---|---|---|
| 1 | UD Tacuense | 24 | 21 | 2 | 1 | 155 | 8 | +147 | 65 | Qualification for title play-off |
| 2 | CD Echedey | 24 | 18 | 4 | 2 | 116 | 21 | +95 | 58 | Qualification for title play-off |
| 3 | UD Granadilla Tenerife Sur B | 24 | 18 | 3 | 3 | 89 | 14 | +75 | 57 | |
| 4 | CD Tarsa | 24 | 15 | 3 | 6 | 52 | 24 | +28 | 48 | |
| 5 | Atlético Unión de Güímar | 24 | 14 | 3 | 7 | 71 | 38 | +33 | 45 | |
| 6 | CD Once Piratas | 24 | 13 | 4 | 7 | 50 | 25 | +25 | 43 | |
| 7 | CD Laguna | 24 | 9 | 4 | 11 | 38 | 54 | −16 | 31 | |
| 8 | CD San Lorenzo-Constancia | 24 | 9 | 4 | 11 | 54 | 75 | −21 | 31 | |
| 9 | Atlético Tacoronte | 24 | 7 | 2 | 15 | 36 | 65 | −29 | 23 | |
| 10 | CD Ofra | 24 | 5 | 1 | 18 | 28 | 94 | −66 | 16 | |
| 11 | UD Hidalgo | 24 | 4 | 1 | 19 | 19 | 89 | −70 | 13 | |
| 12 | CD Llano del Moro | 24 | 3 | 3 | 18 | 26 | 84 | −58 | 12 | |
| 13 | UD San Antonio Pilar | 24 | 2 | 2 | 20 | 22 | 165 | −143 | 8 | Relegation to Regional leagues |

=== Bracket ===
Semifinals
1 | CD Echedey Timbamba | 0 | 2 | 0
4 | CD Femarguín | 0 | 4 | 6
3 | CD Achamán Santa Lucía | 5 | 0 | 5
2 | UD Tacuense | 2 | 3 | 5

Finals
CD Femarguín | 2 | 1 | 3
UD Tacuense | 2 | 1 | 3

== Group 7 ==
| Pos | Team | Pld | W | D | L | GF | GA | GD | Pts | Qualification or relegation |
|---|---|---|---|---|---|---|---|---|---|---|
| 1 | Valencia CF B | 26 | 18 | 5 | 3 | 63 | 22 | +41 | 59 | |
| 2 | Lorca FAD | 26 | 17 | 3 | 6 | 42 | 19 | +23 | 54 | Qualification for promotion play-off |
| 3 | UD Aldaia | 26 | 16 | 5 | 5 | 55 | 24 | +31 | 53 | runner-up |
| 4 | Sporting Plaza de Argel | 26 | 16 | 1 | 9 | 57 | 33 | +24 | 49 | |
| 5 | Levante UD B | 26 | 14 | 6 | 6 | 38 | 23 | +15 | 48 | |
| 6 | CFF Albacete | 26 | 11 | 7 | 8 | 48 | 43 | +5 | 40 | |
| 7 | Elche CF | 26 | 10 | 4 | 12 | 36 | 34 | +2 | 34 | |
| 8 | Villarreal CF | 26 | 9 | 6 | 11 | 41 | 39 | +2 | 33 | |
| 9 | Mislata CF | 26 | 10 | 3 | 13 | 37 | 48 | −11 | 33 | |
| 10 | CF Ciudad de Benidorm | 26 | 9 | 4 | 13 | 33 | 52 | −19 | 31 | |
| 11 | Alhama CF | 26 | 9 | 4 | 13 | 33 | 52 | −19 | 31 | |
| 12 | CFF Marítim | 16 | 8 | 5 | 3 | 45 | 41 | +4 | 29 | Relegation to Regional leagues |
| 13 | CDE Al-Basit | 26 | 5 | 2 | 19 | 24 | 71 | −47 | 17 | Relegation to Regional leagues |
| 14 | CD Zeneta | 26 | 2 | 1 | 23 | 8 | 74 | −66 | 7 | Relegation to Regional leagues |

== Best runner-up ==
The best runner-up of the entire group phase qualified automatically for the promotion play-off

| Grp | Team | Pld | W | D | L | GF | GA | GD | Pts |
|---|---|---|---|---|---|---|---|---|---|
| 6 | CD Fermaguín | 26 | 24 | 1 | 1 | 193 | 13 | +180 | 73 |
| 4 | Granada CF | 26 | 21 | 2 | 3 | 116 | 19 | +97 | 65 |
| 2 | Mulier FCN | 27 | 20 | 2 | 5 | 81 | 38 | +43 | 62 |
| 1 | Peluquería Mixta Friol | 24 | 19 | 1 | 4 | 99 | 35 | +64 | 58 |
| 3 | FC Levante Las Planas | 26 | 16 | 6 | 4 | 77 | 32 | +45 | 54 |
| 7 | UD Aldaia | 26 | 16 | 5 | 5 | 55 | 24 | +31 | 53 |
| 5 | CD Canillas | 26 | 16 | 3 | 7 | 44 | 27 | +17 | 51 |

== Playoffs bracket ==
Quarterfinals
1 | Lorca FAD | 0 | 0 | 0
8 | CD Fermaguín | 0 | 3 | 3
4 | CDEF Logroño | 1 | 0 | 1
5 | Real Betis | 2 | 4 | 6
2 | UD Tacuense | 1 | 2 | 3
7 | Madrid CFF | 1 | 1 | 2
3 | CE Seagull | 1 | 1 | 2
6 | FVPR El Olivo | 0 | 1 | 1

Semifinals
CD Fermaguín | 1 | 1 | 2
Real Betis | 1 | 2 | 3
UD Tacuense | 0 | 2 | 2
CE Seagull | 0 | 0 | 0

Promotion
Real Betis
UD Tacuense

Real Betis and UD Tacuense achieved promotion to the 2016–17 Primera División. Both teams will make their debut in the top league.
