= CF Unión Viera =

Spanish football team

Unión Viera
- Full name: Club de Fútbol Unión Viera
- Founded: 1962; 64 years ago
- Ground: Pepe Gonçalvez, Las Palmas, Canary Islands, Spain
- Capacity: 3,500
- Chairman: Pacuco Ramos
- Manager: Ángel Luis Camacho
- League: Interinsular Preferente
- 2025–26: Interinsular Preferente, 8th of 19
- Website: http://www.unionviera.com/
Home colours	Away colours

Club de Fútbol Unión Viera is a Spanish football team based in Las Palmas, in the autonomous community of Canary Islands. Founded in 1962, it plays in Interinsular Preferente, holding home matches at Estadio Pepe Gonçalvez.

== History ==
In the 2017–18 season, the club finished 2nd in the Regional Preferente Canarias Division, Group 1 and promoted to the Tercera División.

On November 6, 2021, the club roped in Atharv Dandekar, first Indian recruit.

== Season to season ==
Season	Tier	Division	Place	Copa del Rey
1991–92	7	2ª Reg.	2nd	
1992–93	6	1ª Reg.	12th	
1993–94	6	1ª Reg.	3rd	
1994–95	6	1ª Reg.	12th	
1995–96	6	1ª Reg.	4th	
1996–97	6	1ª Reg.	12th	
1997–98	6	1ª Reg.	12th	
1998–99	6	1ª Reg.	10th	
1999–2000	6	1ª Reg.	10th	
2000–01	6	1ª Reg.	6th	
2001–02	6	1ª Reg.	10th	
2002–03	6	1ª Reg.	8th	
2003–04	6	1ª Reg.	4th	
2004–05	6	1ª Reg.	7th	
2005–06	6	1ª Reg.	8th	
2006–07	6	1ª Reg.	6th	
2007–08	6	1ª Reg.	3rd	
2008–09	6	1ª Reg.	2nd	
2009–10	6	1ª Reg.	1st	
2010–11	5	Int. Pref.	11th	

Season	Tier	Division	Place	Copa del Rey
2011–12	5	Int. Pref.	1st	
2012–13	4	3ª	4th	
2013–14	4	3ª	14th	
2014–15	4	3ª	8th	
2015–16	4	3ª	15th	
2016–17	4	3ª	18th	
2017–18	5	Int. Pref.	2nd	
2018–19	4	3ª	3rd	
2019–20	4	3ª	10th	
2020–21	4	3ª	5th / 6th	
2021–22	5	3ª RFEF	16th	
2022–23	6	Int. Pref.	1st	
2023–24	6	Int. Pref.	2nd	
2024–25	5	3ª Fed.	18th	
2025–26	6	Int. Pref.		

- 7 seasons in Tercera División
- 2 seasons in Tercera Federación/Tercera División RFEF

== Women's team ==
Despite achieving promotion on 19 April 2019 to Primera División B, the newly-formed second tier, two months later, the Royal Spanish Football Federation disallowed their promotion to the second tier.

=== Season to season ===
Season	Div.	Pos.	Copa de la Reina
2001/02	2ª	3rd	
2002/03	2ª	4th	
2003/04	2ª	3rd	
2004/05	2ª	8th	
2005/06	2ª	6th	
2006/07	2ª	3rd	
2007/08	2ª	5th	
2008/09	2ª	5th	
2009/10	2ª	7th	
2010/11	2ª	8th	
2011/12	2ª	8th	
2012/13	2ª	3rd	
2013/14	2ª	3rd	
2014/15	2ª	3rd	
2015/16	2ª	3rd	
2016/17	2ª	4th	
2017/18	2ª	4th	
2018/19	2ª	3rd (Note: Due to the creation of the new Primera División B, the team remained in the same league but it became the third level.)	
2019/20	2ª		
