= Málaga CF Femenino =

Spanish football club

Málaga
- Full name: Málaga Club de Fútbol
- Founded: 1992 (as Atlético Málaga); 2016 (as Málaga CF)
- Ground: José Gallardo, Málaga, Andalusia, Spain
- Capacity: 7,616
- Chairman: González López
- Manager: Antonio Contreras
- League: Primera División B
- 2018–19: Primera División, 15th (relegated)
- Website: http://www.malagacf.com/
Home colours	Away colours

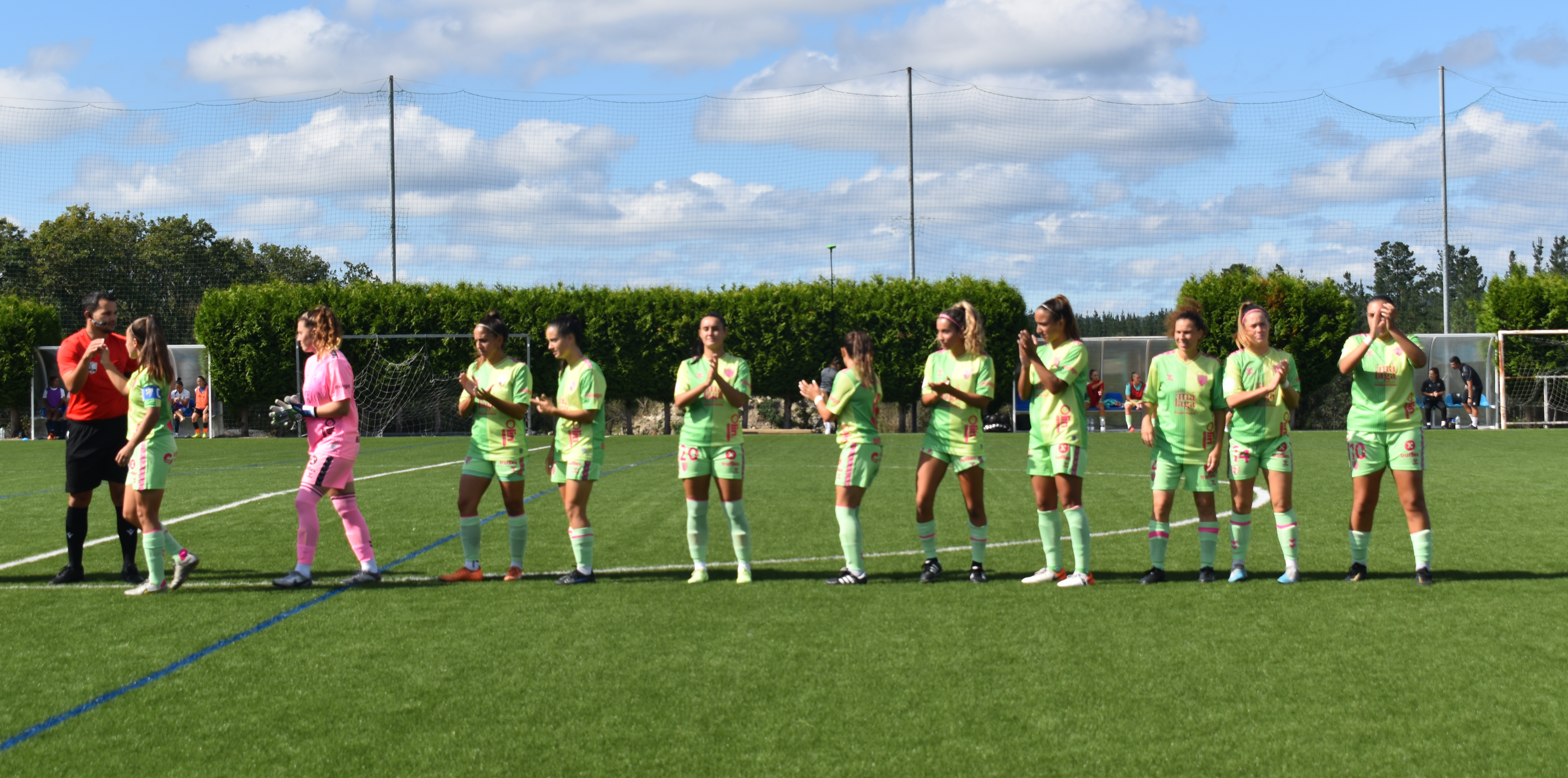
2023-24 squad.

Málaga CF Femenino is the women's football team of Spanish club Málaga CF. It currently plays in Primera División B.

== History ==
Founded in 1992 as Club Atlético Málaga, they were one of the leading Spanish teams in the second half of the 1990s, and in 1998 they won both the national League and Cup. They are one of four Spanish teams that have won the double, the other ones being CD Oroquieta Villaverde in 1999, Levante UD in 2001 and 2002, and RCD Espanyol in 2006. However this golden era soon came to an end and they were relegated.

Atlético Málaga returned to the top-flight in 2008. In 2011 they narrowly avoided relegation, but it was relegated in the next season.

On 9 June 2016, Málaga CF announced the club would be definitely integrated in the structure of the club. Atlético Málaga had previously been wearing Málaga's kit during several years, despite not being an official section of the club.

In May 2018, the club promoted to Primera División six years after their last relegation, but dropped into the new Primera División B after a single season.

== Season by season ==
- As Atlético Málaga

Season	Division	Place	Copa de la Reina
2003/04	2ª	2nd	
2004/05	2ª	4th	
2005/06	2ª	3rd	
2006/07	2ª	1st	
2007/08	2ª	1st	
2008/09	1ª	13th	
2009/10	1ª	18th	
2010/11	1ª	16th	
2011/12	1ª	16th	
2012/13	2ª	6th	
2013/14	2ª	5th	
2014/15	2ª	4th	
2015/16	2ª	4th	

- As Málaga CF

Season	Division	Place	Copa de la Reina
2016/17	2ª	3rd	
2017/18	2ª	1st	
2018/19	1ª	15th	Round of 16
2019/20	2ªP	5th	
2020/21	2ªP		

== Honours ==
Atlético Málaga logo, used until 2016

- Primera División (1): 1998
- Spanish Cup (1): 1998
- Spanish Supercup (1): 1998

== Players ==
=== Current squad ===
As of 1 July 2020, according to Málaga CF's website.
Note: Flags indicate national team as defined under FIFA eligibility rules; some limited exceptions apply. Players may hold more than one non-FIFA nationality.

No.	Pos.	Nation	Player
4	DF	ESP	Marta Cazalla
5	DF	ESP	Encarni
7	FW	ESP	María Ruiz
13	GK	ESP	Alba
15	DF	ESP	Ruth
20	FW	ESP	Celia Ruano
21	DF	ESP	Míriam
23	MF	ESP	Sandra
24	DF	ESP	María Farfán

No.	Pos.	Nation	Player
34	MF	ESP	Nora
—	GK	BEL	Inés Fernández
—	GK	ESP	Noelia Gil
—	MF	ESP	Ana Buceta
—	FW	ESP	Judith Acosta
—	FW	ESP	Claudia García
—	FW	ESP	Carol González
—	FW	ESP	Cintia Hormigo
—	GK	ESP	Andrea Romero

=== Former internationals ===
- Spain: Alicia Fuentes, Esther González, Auxiliadora Jiménez, Adriana Martín
- Brazil: Mayara
- Cameroon: Gaëlle Enganamouit
- Colombia: Stefany Castaño
- Ecuador: Kerlly Real
- Mali: Bassira Toure
- Mexico: Pamela Tajonar, Natalia Gómez Junco
- Poland: Natalia Padilla
- Puerto Rico: Karina Socarrás
- Slovenia: Dominika Čonč
- South Africa: Ode Fulutudilu
- Uruguay: Yamila Badell, Pamela González
