= FC Badalona Women =

Association football club in Spain

Badalona Women
- Full name: Futbol Club Badalona Women
- Founded: 1983; 43 years ago
- Stadium: Estadi Municipal de Badalona
- Capacity: 4,170
- Owner: Mercury 13
- President: Josep Bellet
- Head coach: Ana Junyent
- League: Liga F
- 2025–26: 10th
- Website: instagram.com/elnostreclub
Home colours

Futbol Club Badalona Women, also officially shortened to ONA (Catalan for "wave") – and previously known as Levante Las Planas (Llevant Les Planes) and Levante Badalona – is a Spanish professional women's football club based in Badalona, Barcelona (formerly based in the Les Planes area of Sant Joan Despí, Barcelona). It competes in the Liga F, the top tier of Spanish women's football, playing home matches at the Estadi Municipal de Badalona.

== History ==
Levante Las Planas was founded in 1983 in Las Planas district as a merge of local teams UP Bética and Rayo Planense. The club is best known for its women's team, established in 1998. On the other hand, the male team plays in 9th-tier Tercera Catalana.

In 2012 Levante Las Planas was promoted to the Primera División for the first time after topping its Segunda División group and beating Fundación Albacete and UD Tacuense in the play-offs. In its debut season the team ended in the lower half of the table with a comfortable 16 points margin over relegation positions.

The club was promoted to the top division again on the final matchday of the 2021–22 season, beating direct rivals Espanyol (a fellow Catalan club and six-time Spanish champions) by a 3–0 scoreline.

== Players ==
=== Current squad ===
As of 12 August 2026

Note: Flags indicate national team as defined under FIFA eligibility rules; some limited exceptions apply. Players may hold more than one non-FIFA nationality.

No.	Pos.	Nation	Player
1	GK	ESP	María Valenzuela
2	DF	ESP	Núria Garrote
3	DF	ESP	Berta Pujadas
4	DF	ESP	Sonia Majarín
6	MF	ESP	María Llompart
7	FW	ESP	Irina Uribe
11	FW	ESP	Elena Julve
13	GK	CHI	Antonia Canales

No.	Pos.	Nation	Player
16	DF	ESP	Itziar Pinillos
17	MF	ESP	Paula Sanchez
19	MF	ESP	Lorena Navarro
21	DF	ESP	Célya Barclais
23	DF	ESP	Cristina Cubedo
—	GK	ESP	Sara Extremera
—	MF	NGR	Chinyere Kalu

=== Reserve team ===
Note: Flags indicate national team as defined under FIFA eligibility rules; some limited exceptions apply. Players may hold more than one non-FIFA nationality.

No.	Pos.	Nation	Player
26	GK	ESP	Carla Abdón
27	DF	ESP	Berta Doltra
28	MF	ESP	Aina Meya
—	FW	ESP	Abril Rodrigo
29	DF	ESP	Laia Abdón
30	FW	SUR	Isabelle Hoekstra
30	GK	ESP	Andrea Cano
31	DF	ESP	Martina Rojo
31	GK	ESP	Ona Barrón
32	GK	ESP	Noa Malagelada
33	DF	ESP	Lucía Carmona
40	MF	ESP	Nerea Carmona
41	GK	ESP	Laia Rius

=== Former internationals ===
- Mexico: Pamela Tajonar
- Spain: Alicia Fuentes

== Seasons ==
Season	Division	Pos.	Copa de la Reina
2007–08	3 (Gr. ?)	1st	
2008–09	2ª (Gr. 3)	13th	
2009–10	3 (Gr. ?)	1st	
2010–11	2ª (Gr. 3)	3rd	
2011–12	2ª (Gr. 3)	1st	
2012–13	1ª	11th	
2013–14	1ª	16th	
2014–15	2ª (Gr. 3)	1st	
2015–16	2ª (Gr. 3)	3rd	
2016–17	2ª (Gr. 3)	11th	
2017–18	2ª (Gr. 3)	12th	
2018–19	Pref. Cat.	1st	
2019–20	1ª Nac	4th	
2020–21	1ª Nac	1st	
2021–22	2ª	1st	First round
2022–23	1ª	11th	Second round
2023–24	1ª	13th	Round of 16
2024–25	1ª	13th	Round of 16
2025–26	1ª	10th	Semi-finals

== Men's team ==
Season	Tier	Division	Place	Copa del Rey
1984–85	7	2ª Reg.	9th	
1985–86	7	2ª Reg.	3rd	
1986–87	7	2ª Reg.	3rd	
1987–88	7	2ª Reg.	1st	
1988–89	6	1ª Reg.	1st	
1989–90	5	Reg. Pref.	3rd	
1990–91	5	Reg. Pref.	9th	
1991–92	5	1ª Cat.	8th	
1992–93	5	1ª Cat.	19th	
1993–94	6	Pref. Terr.	17th	
1994–95	7	1ª Terr.	9th	
1995–96	7	1ª Terr.	1st	
1996–97	6	Pref. Terr.	17th	
1997–98	7	1ª Terr.	5th	
1998–99	7	1ª Terr.	11th	
1999–2000	7	1ª Terr.	17th	
2000–01	8	2ª Terr.	7th	
2001–02	8	2ª Terr.	3rd	
2002–03	8	2ª Terr.	5th	
2003–04	8	2ª Terr.	1st	

Season	Tier	Division	Place	Copa del Rey
2004–05	7	1ª Terr.	16th	
2005–06	8	2ª Terr.	7th	
2006–07	8	2ª Terr.	12th	
2007–08	8	2ª Terr.	4th	
2008–09	8	2ª Terr.	3rd	
2009–10	8	2ª Terr.	4th	
2010–11	8	2ª Terr.	12th	
2011–12	7	3ª Cat.	3rd	
2012–13	7	3ª Cat.	10th	
2013–14	7	3ª Cat.	2nd	
2014–15	7	3ª Cat.	3rd	
2015–16	7	3ª Cat.	7th	
2016–17	7	3ª Cat.	11th	
2017–18	7	3ª Cat.	8th	
2018–19	7	3ª Cat.	5th	
2019–20	7	3ª Cat.	3rd	
2020–21	7	3ª Cat.	1st	
2021–22	7	2ª Cat.	7th	
2022–23	7	2ª Cat.	9th	
2023–24	8	2ª Cat.	16th	

Season	Tier	Division	Place	Copa del Rey
2024–25	9	3ª Cat.		
