= FVPR El Olivo =

Spanish sports club

- Full name: Federación Viguesa de Peñas Recreativas "El Olivo"
- Founded: 1991
- Dissolved: 2018
- Ground: Pabellón Polideportivo Monte da Mina, Vigo
- Capacity: 1,000
- Chairman: Balbino Moreira
- Manager: Joaquín Balbuena
- League: Segunda División
- 2011-12: Primera División, 17th (relegated)
- Website: http://www.fprelolivo.org/futbol11a.htm
| Home colours | Away colours |

Federación Viguesa de Peñas Recreativas El Olivo, Sección Deportiva is a Spanish sports club from Vigo founded in 1991. It holds women's football, women's futsal and pétanque teams, being best known for the first one, which played in Primera División.

== History ==
El Olivo earned promotion in May 2011 after topping Segunda División's Group 1 and overcoming UD Tacuense and Girona FC in the play-offs, becoming the first team from Galicia to play in Superliga/Primera since the category's unification in 2001. The team was subsequently relegated as it was second to last in its debut season.

On 7 July 2017, despite avoiding the relegation from the Segunda División, the club was sanctioned and relegated due to an illegal alignment of a player during the whole season.

In August 2018, El Olivo announced the dissolution of the football section.

== Season to season ==
| Season | Tier | Division | Place | Copa de la Reina |
|---|---|---|---|---|
| 2005/06 | 2 | 2ª (G2) | 4th | |
| 2006/07 | 2 | 2ª (G2) | 2nd | |
| 2007/08 | 2 | 2ª (G2) | 1st | |
| 2008/09 | 2 | 2ª (G2) | 3rd | |
| 2009/10 | 2 | 2ª (G2) | 2nd | |
| 2010/11 | 2 | 2ª (G2) | 1st | |
| 2011/12 | 1 | 1ª | 17th | |
| 2012/13 | 2 | 2ª | 10th | |
| 2013/14 | 2 | 2ª | 1st | |
| 2014/15 | 2 | 2ª | 1st | |
| 2015/16 | 2 | 2ª | 1st | |
| 2016/17 | 2 | 2ª | 11th | |
| 2017/18 | 4 | 2ª Reg. | 3rd | |
