= 2014–15 Segunda División (women) =

Segunda División
- Season: 2014–15
- Promoted: Oiartzun KE; UD Granadilla Tenerife Sur

The 2014–15 Segunda División Femenina de Fútbol was the 2014–15 edition of Spain's women's football second league.

== Competition format ==
The champion of each group and the best runner-up qualified to the promotion play-offs. For the group 6, composed by teams from the Canary Islands, the two best teams of each sub-group joined a previous playoff where the champion would be the eighth team qualified.

Only two teams promoted to Primera División.

== Group 1 ==
Pos	Team	Pld	W	D	L	GF	GA	GD	Pts	Qualification or relegation
1	FVPR El Olivo	26	21	3	2	75	23	+52	66	Qualification for promotion play-off
2	EF Mareo	26	14	5	7	52	37	+15	47	runner-up
3	Peluquería Mixta Friol	26	14	3	9	68	49	+19	45	
4	Sárdoma CF	26	12	5	9	53	34	+19	41	
5	SD Villestro	26	12	4	10	49	31	+18	40	
6	CF Bértola Femenino	26	10	9	7	50	45	+5	39	
7	Victoria CF	26	11	6	9	50	44	+6	39	
8	CD Amigos del Duero	26	11	2	13	31	41	−10	35	
9	Orzán SD	26	9	6	11	41	52	−11	33	
10	CD Salamanca FF	26	9	6	11	42	47	−5	33	
11	Erizana CF	26	9	5	12	32	35	−3	32	
12	Oviedo Moderno CF B	26	8	5	13	32	52	−20	29	Relegation to the 2015–16 Regional División
13	Gijón FF	26	8	4	14	40	54	−14	28	Relegation to the 2015–16 Regional División
14	UD Barbadás	26	2	1	23	15	86	−71	7	Relegation to the 2015–16 Regional División

== Group 2 ==
Pos	Team	Pld	W	D	L	GF	GA	GD	Pts	Qualification or relegation
1	Oiartzun KE	26	22	4	0	111	13	+98	70	Qualification for promotion play-off
2	Athletic Club "B"	26	21	3	2	101	20	+81	66	
3	CD Aurrerá de Vitoria	26	17	4	5	39	22	+17	55	runner-up
4	EDF Logroño	26	16	1	9	60	35	+25	49	
5	SD San Ignacio	26	13	8	5	50	27	+23	47	
6	Pauldarrak EFKT	26	14	5	7	74	43	+31	47	
7	Añorga KKE	26	11	8	7	56	49	+7	41	
8	CD Mariño	26	8	8	10	38	35	+3	32	
9	Abanto Club	26	7	4	15	35	62	−27	25	
10	CD Nuestra Señora de Belén	26	6	6	14	32	72	−40	24	
11	CF Ardoi FE	26	6	4	16	35	57	−22	22	
12	Reocín Racing	26	6	3	17	48	68	−20	21	Relegation to the 2015–16 Regional División
13	Gazte Berriak	26	2	4	20	21	96	−75	10	Relegation to the 2015–16 Regional División
14	UD Aragonesa	26	1	2	23	12	128	−116	5	Relegation to the 2015–16 Regional División

== Group 3 ==
Pos	Team	Pld	W	D	L	GF	GA	GD	Pts	Qualification or relegation
1	FC Levante Las Planas	26	22	1	3	85	20	+65	67	Qualification for promotion play-off
2	FC Barcelona "B"	26	19	6	1	77	12	+65	63	
3	CE Seagull	26	15	6	5	51	34	+17	51	runner-up
4	RCD Espanyol "B"	26	10	9	7	38	27	+11	39	
5	UE L'Estartit	26	11	5	10	38	36	+2	38	
6	CE Europa	26	11	5	10	50	45	+5	38	
7	CF Igualada	26	10	8	8	40	33	+7	38	
8	AD Son Sardina	26	10	6	10	51	49	+2	36	
9	SE AEM	26	9	7	10	46	41	+5	34	
10	CE Sant Gabriel "B"	26	7	8	11	42	48	−6	29	Relegation to the 2015–16 Regional División
11	CUE Vic	26	8	4	14	32	44	−12	28	
12	CD Transportes Alcaine "B"	26	8	3	15	35	65	−30	27	Relegation to the 2015–16 Regional División
13	UE Sant Andreu	26	4	1	21	27	70	−43	13	Relegation to the 2015–16 Regional División
14	CF Lloret	26	3	1	22	27	115	−88	10	Relegation to the 2015–16 Regional División

== Group 4 ==
Pos	Team	Pld	W	D	L	GF	GA	GD	Pts	Qualification or relegation
1	Real Betis Balompié	26	23	2	1	116	13	+103	71	Qualification for promotion play-off
2	CFF Badajoz	26	22	3	1	80	21	+59	69	runner-up
3	Granada CF	26	20	2	4	97	23	+74	62	
4	Atlético Málaga	26	13	4	9	60	35	+25	43	
5	CFF Cáceres	25	12	4	9	60	46	+14	40	
6	Extremadura Femenino CF	26	11	6	9	43	48	−5	39	
7	ADFB La Rambla	26	11	5	10	52	55	−3	38	
8	Algaidas CD	26	9	7	10	65	66	−1	34	
9	AD El Naranjo	26	9	5	12	62	79	−17	32	
10	UD La Cruz Villanovense	26	9	4	13	47	73	−26	31	
11	CD Híspalis	26	8	4	14	42	53	−11	28	
12	Monachil 2013 CF	26	4	1	21	27	97	−70	13	Relegation to the 2015–16 Regional División
13	AD Nervión	26	2	4	20	30	103	−73	10	Relegation to the 2015–16 Regional División
14	UD Carmelitas	26	3	1	22	23	92	−69	10	Relegation to the 2015–16 Regional División

== Group 5 ==
Pos	Team	Pld	W	D	L	GF	GA	GD	Pts	Qualification or relegation
1	Madrid CFF	26	22	3	1	117	17	+100	69	Qualification for promotion play-off
2	CD Canillas	26	19	2	5	58	27	+31	59	runner-up
3	Atlético de Madrid "B"	26	16	4	6	59	23	+36	52	
4	AD Alhóndiga	26	15	3	8	66	43	+23	48	
5	CF Pozuelo de Alarcón	26	13	8	5	54	33	+21	47	
6	FF La Solana	26	14	3	9	47	37	+10	45	
7	Dinamo Guadalajara	26	13	4	9	44	37	+7	43	
8	Rayo Vallecano "B"	26	8	6	12	40	51	−11	30	
9	CD Parquesol	26	8	5	13	37	45	−8	29	
10	Casa Social Católica de Ávila	26	7	6	13	41	64	−23	27	
11	Torrelodones CF	26	7	4	15	22	45	−23	25	
12	CDE TNT Daimiel	26	4	8	14	23	65	−42	20	Relegation to the 2015–16 Regional División
13	UD Tres Cantos	26	4	6	16	31	55	−24	18	Relegation to the 2015–16 Regional División
14	CD Independiente de Alcázar	26	0	2	24	16	113	−97	2	Relegation to the 2015–16 Regional División

== Group 6 ==
=== Group 6.1 ===
Pos	Team	Pld	W	D	L	GF	GA	GD	Pts	Qualification
1	CD Femarguín	24	22	1	1	261	9	+252	67	Qualification for title play-off
2	CD Achamán Santa Lucía	24	20	2	2	160	20	+140	62	Qualification for title play-off
3	CD Águilas	24	17	4	3	100	28	+72	55	
4	CF Unión Viera	24	17	2	5	100	27	+73	53	
5	CD Las Majoreras	24	16	3	5	65	38	+27	51	
6	CF UD Las Torres	24	10	1	13	49	86	−37	31	
7	CD Colegio Norte Viera	24	9	4	11	37	71	−34	31	
8	CF Vegueta Árbol Bonito	24	10	1	13	62	63	−1	31	
9	UJ Costa Ayala	24	8	2	14	61	109	−48	26	
10	UD Montaña Alta	24	7	1	16	52	103	−51	22	
11	Tagodor CD	24	4	1	19	24	150	−126	13	
12	CD Firgas	24	1	4	19	32	127	−95	7	
13	CF 5 Continentes	24	1	2	21	19	191	−172	5	

=== Group 6.2 ===
Pos	Team	Pld	W	D	L	GF	GA	GD	Pts	Qualification
1	UD Granadilla Tenerife Sur	24	24	0	0	219	3	+216	72	Qualification for title play-off
2	UD Tacuense	24	19	3	2	101	12	+89	60	Qualification for title play-off
3	CD Echedey	24	15	4	5	78	27	+51	49	
4	CD Laguna	24	15	4	5	71	20	+51	49	
5	CD Tarsa	24	11	5	8	60	30	+30	38	
6	CD Once Piratas	24	11	4	9	47	57	−10	37	
7	CD Charco del Pino	24	11	1	12	55	42	+13	34	
8	Atlético Tacoroente	24	9	5	10	59	57	+2	32	
9	CF Costa Adeje	24	9	4	11	44	61	−17	31	
10	CD Llamoro	24	7	2	15	29	71	−42	23	
11	CD Candela	24	4	3	17	31	104	−73	15	
12	UD San Antonio Pilar	24	3	0	21	19	172	−153	9	
13	Moneyba Hierro	24	0	1	23	11	168	−157	1	

=== Bracket ===
Semifinals
1	UD Tacuense	0	0	0
4	CD Femarguín	0	1	1
3	CD Achamán Santa Lucía	0	1	1
2	UD Granadilla Tenerife Sur	1	6	7

Finals
CD Femarguín	3	1	4
UD Granadilla Tenerife Sur	2	1	3

== Group 7 ==
Pos	Team	Pld	W	D	L	GF	GA	GD	Pts	Qualification or relegation
1	Sporting CF Plaza de Argel	26	19	3	4	82	32	+50	60	Qualification for promotion play-off
2	UD Aldaia	26	17	7	2	49	21	+28	58	runner-up
3	CFF Albacete	26	14	8	4	59	37	+22	50	
4	Valencia CF "B"	26	15	4	7	49	24	+25	49	
5	Levante UD "B"	26	15	3	8	45	29	+16	48	
6	CFF Marítim	26	12	7	7	49	32	+17	43	
7	Villarreal CF	26	11	4	11	48	39	+9	37	
8	Lorca FAD	26	9	4	13	36	50	−14	31	
9	Elche CF	26	8	6	12	28	39	−11	30	
10	CF Ciudad de Benidorm	26	8	4	14	37	51	−14	28	
11	Alhama CF	26	7	3	16	25	53	−28	24	
12	Murcia FCF	26	5	5	16	29	65	−36	20	Relegation to the 2015–16 Regional División
13	AF Cartagena Féminas	26	6	2	18	40	81	−41	20	Relegation to the 2015–16 Regional División
14	CFF Ciutat de Torrent	26	3	6	17	27	50	−23	15	Relegation to the 2015–16 Regional División

== Best runner-up ==
The best runner-up of the entire group phase qualified automatically for the promotion play-off

Grp	Team	Pld	W	D	L	GF	GA	GD	Pts
6	UD Granadilla Tenerife Sur	24	24	0	0	219	3	+216	72
4	CFF Badajoz	26	22	3	1	80	21	+59	69
5	CD Canillas	26	19	2	5	58	27	+31	59
7	UD Aldaia	26	17	7	2	49	21	+28	58
2	Aurrera Vitoria	26	17	4	5	39	22	+17	55
3	CE Seagull	26	15	6	5	51	34	+17	51
1	EF Mareo	26	14	5	7	52	37	+15	47

== Promotion playoffs ==
=== Bracket ===
Quarterfinals
1	Madrid CFF	4	0	4
8	Oiartzun KE	2	4	6
4	CD Fermaguín	2	0	2
5	FVPR El Olivo	1	1	2
2	UD Granadilla Tenerife Sur	3	0	3
7	FC Levante Las Planas	0	0	1
3	Sporting Plaza de Argel	1	1	2
6	Real Betis	4	7	11

Semifinals
Oiartzun KE	2	2	4
FVPR El Olivo	1	1	2
UD Granadilla Tenerife Sur	3	3	6
Real Betis	1	3	4

Promotion
Oiartzun KE
UD Granadilla Tenerife Sur
