= Sevilla FC (women) =

Spanish football club

Sevilla
- Full name: Sevilla Fútbol Club Femenino
- Nicknames: Sevillistas; Las Rojiblancas (Red-Whites); Las nervionenses
- Founded: 2008; 18 years ago
- Ground: Estadio Jesús Navas, Seville, Andalusia, Spain
- Capacity: 8,000
- President: José Castro Carmona
- Head coach: David Losada
- League: Liga F
- 2025–26: Liga F, 8th
- Website: sevillafc.es/femenino
Home colours	Away colours

Sevilla FC Femenino is a Spanish women's football team, representing Sevilla FC. It currently competes in Liga F.

== History ==
=== Collaboration with CD Híspalis ===
In 2004, Sevilla FC signed a collaboration with local Superliga Femenina team CD Híspalis. While remaining an independent club, Híspalis played for the next three seasons in Sevilla FC's training facilities using its name, kit and badge. The team improved significantly, and in 2006, it was the runner-up of the Superliga, losing what would have been their first title to RCD Espanyol on the goal average. Sevilla's Auxiliadora Jiménez was the season's top scorer.

Sevilla/Híspalis declined as fast as it emerged, and in 2008, it ended last in the table and relegated to the second tier.

=== Sevilla FC own team ===
Following the resulting relegation Sevilla FC broke with Híspalis and created their own women's team in 2008, beginning from the regional categories. In 2009, the team reached Primera Nacional, as it was then known Segunda División, but was instead promoted directly to the Superliga as RFEF decided to expand the category with women's sections of clubs from the male leagues.

Sevilla played two seasons in the Superliga before being relegated in 2011. The following year it returned to the top category after topping its group and beating Oiartzun KE and CD Femarguín in the promotion play-offs. They were relegated to the Segunda División at the end of the 2014–15 Primera División season before returning to the Primera División after the 2016–17 season.

== Season to season ==
Season	Div.	Pos.	Copa de la Reina
2008/09	Reg.	1st	
2009/10	1ª	11th	Round of 16
2010/11	1ª	18th	
2011/12	2ª	1st	
2012/13	1ª	12th	
2013/14	1ª	14th	
2014/15	1ª	16th	
2015/16	2ª	3rd	
2016/17	2ª	1st	
2017/18	1ª	12th	
2018/19	1ª	10th	Semifinalist
2019/20	1ª	11th	Semifinals*
2020/21	1ª	8th	Quarterfinals
2021/22	1ª	8th	Quarterfinals
2022/23	1ª	7th	Round of 16
2023/24	1ª	7th	Quarterfinals
2024/25	1ª	9th	Round of 16
2025/26	1ª	8th	Round of 16

== Players ==
=== Current squad ===
As of 4 July 2026.

Note: Flags indicate national team as defined under FIFA eligibility rules; some limited exceptions apply. Players may hold more than one non-FIFA nationality.

No.	Pos.	Nation	Player
1	GK	ESP	Esther Sullastres
4	DF	ESP	Isabel Álvarez
5	MF	ESP	Eva Llamas
6	MF	ESP	Alicia Redondo
7	DF	ESP	Raquel
8	FW	GUA	Andrea Álvarez
9	FW	GAM	Fatou Kanteh
10	FW	CHI	Millaray Cortés
11	FW	ESP	Lucía Moral
13	GK	ESP	María Echezarreta

No.	Pos.	Nation	Player
14	FW	BEL	Jassina Blom
15	DF	ESP	Ester
16	MF	ESP	Iris Arnaiz
19	FW	ESP	Alba Cerrato
20	MF	ESP	Rosa Márquez
21	MF	ESP	Gemma Gili
24	DF	FRA	Alice Marques
30	DF	ESP	Alba López
—	DF	ESP	Nazareth Martín
—	FW	ESP	Laura Pérez
—	DF	ESP	Claudia Blanco

=== Reserve team ===
Note: Flags indicate national team as defined under FIFA eligibility rules; some limited exceptions apply. Players may hold more than one non-FIFA nationality.

No.	Pos.	Nation	Player
27	FW	ESP	Carla Aguilar
28	DF	ESP	Andrea Gálvez
31	GK	ESP	Mercedes Pérez
32	DF	ESP	Carla Rey Govantes
35	DF	ESP	Xenia Barrios
37	FW	ESP	Carmen Durán
