= Marta Docando =

Spanish footballer

Personal information
- Full name: Marta Docando Gómez
- Date of birth: 13 May 1982 (age 44)
- Place of birth: Barakaldo, Spain
- Position: Midfielder

Senior career*
| Years | Team | Apps | (Gls) |
- Bizkerre
- Rayo Vallecano
| 2004–2007 | Torrejón | | |
| 2007–2012 | Atlético Madrid | 86 | (7) |

International career
- Basque Country
- * Club domestic league appearances and goals as of 19:02, 6 September 2021 (UTC)

Marta Docando Gómez (born 13 May 1982), also known as Marti, is a Spanish retired football midfielder. She played for Rayo Vallecano, Atlético Madrid and AD Torrejón in her career.

== Career ==
At Atlético Madrid, Docando played as one of the captains alongside Alba Merino. She played for the Basque Country national team in a game against Slovakia, a game which the Basque Country won 1–0. On 20 June 2012, she announced her retirement from football.

== Playing style ==
Gara praised Docando for her technical ability and vision. Mundo Deportivo, in a 2004 article, also commented on her technical ability in a positive way and also opined that she was effective in both defence and attack. They did express, however, that she lacked physical ability at the time.
