= Tercera Federación (women) =

Spanish women's football league

- Founded: 2001 (as Segunda División, second tier); 2019 (as Primera Nacional, became third tier); 2022 (became fourth tier)
- Country: Spain
- Confederation: UEFA
- Number of clubs: 6 groups of 14 teams
- Level on pyramid: 4
- Promotion to: Segunda Federación
- Relegation to: Regional leagues
- Current: 2026–27

The Tercera Federación FUTFEM is the fourth tier of league competition for Spanish women's football. It is the female equivalent of the men's Segunda División RFEF and is run by the Real Federación Española de Fútbol.

== History ==
The league was created in 2001, with the inception of the new Superliga Femenina, composed by only group instead of the four of the previous seasons.

Since 2011, teams were divided in seven groups by geographical criteria.

- Group 1: Asturias, Cantabria and Galicia.
- Group 2: Basque Country, La Rioja and Navarre.
- Group 3: Aragon, Balearic Islands and Catalonia.
- Group 4: Andalusia, Ceuta, Extremadura and Melilla.
- Group 5: Castile and León, Castile-La Mancha and Community of Madrid.
- Group 6: Canary Islands.
- Group 7: Region of Murcia and Valencian Community.

The league was renamed as the Primera Nacional de Fútbol in 2019 after the RFEF renamed the new division between it and the first tier as Segunda División Pro, after initially naming it Primera División B.

In early 2022, it was confirmed that the league structure would be altered again, after only three seasons: the existing Primera División would be a standalone professional league of 16 teams, a single nationwide 16-team division known as the Primera Federación would be created as the second tier, the existing Segunda División Pro of 32 teams (two regionalised 16-team groups) would become the third tier and be named the Segunda Federación, and the existing Primera Nacional division of 96 teams (six regionalised 16-team groups) would become the fourth tier. These levels would be administered by the RFEF and more closely resemble the men's post-2021 structure, albeit only one professional league and six fourth-tier groups rather than five. The fourth level was renamed the Tercera Federación FUTFEM prior to the 2023–24 season.

Since the 2025–26 season, the league was reformed to be played by 18 regional groups, in a similar way to the men's Tercera Federación. The best team overall will directly promote to Segunda Federación and the other 16 teams (only one from the two groups from Andalusia) will play the promotion play-offs.

== Promoted teams ==
This table shows the group winners and the promoted teams.

=== As second tier ===
Season	Group I	Group II	Group III	Group IV	Group V	Group VI	Group VII	Best runner-up
2001–02	Leioa	Amigos del Duero	Barcelona	Rayo Vallecano	Atlético Jiennense	Rayco	—N/a	—N/a
2002–03	Lagunak	Gijón	Barcelona	Rayo Vallecano	Atlético Jiennense	Rayco	—N/a	—N/a
2003–04	Oiartzun	Gijón	Barcelona	Atlético Madrid	Andalucía	Rayco	—N/a	—N/a
2004–05	Transportes Alcaine	Gijón	L'Estartit	Sporting Plaza de Argel	Nuestra Señora de la Antigua	Rayco	—N/a	—N/a
2005–06	Real Sociedad (Note: Real Sociedad was promoted after the dissolution of Estudiantes.)	Atlético Arousana	L'Estartit	Atlético Madrid	Sporting Huelva	Rayco	—N/a	—N/a
2006–07	Mariño	Reocín	L'Estartit	Colegio Alemán	Atlético Málaga	Rayco	—N/a	—N/a
2007–08	Lagunak	El Olivo	Barcelona	Pozuelo de Alarcón	Atlético Málaga	Arguineguín	—N/a	—N/a
2008–09 (Note: As the Superliga was expanded to 22 teams, several professional men's football clubs were invited to the league by promoting or directly creating women's football teams. These teams were Eibar, Gimnàstic, Jaén (Atlético Jiennense), Las Palmas, Sevilla and Valladolid.)	Oiartzun	Oviedo Moderno	Collerense	Fundación Albacete (Note: Winners Atlético Madrid B could not be promoted as they are a reserve team, runners-up played the promotion playoffs.)	Atlético Jiennense	Tacuense	—N/a	—N/a
2009–10	Oiartzun (Note: Winners Athletic Bilbao B could not be promoted as they are a reserve team, runners-up played the promotion playoffs.)	Reocín	Sant Gabriel	Fundación Albacete	Extremadura Femenino	Charco del Pino	—N/a	—N/a
2010–11	Abanto	El Olivo	Girona (Note: Winners Espanyol B could not be promoted as they are a reserve team, runners-up played the promotion playoffs.)	Fundación Albacete (Note: Winners Rayo Vallecano B could not be promoted as they are a reserve team, runners-up played the promotion playoffs.)	Llanos de Olivenza	Tacuense	—N/a	—N/a
2011–12	Oviedo Moderno	Oiartzun	Levante Las Planas	Sevilla	Torrejón	Tacuense	Fundación Albacete	Femarguín
2012–13	Oviedo Moderno (Note: Oviedo Moderno promoted as Torrejón resigned after the end of the season.)	Añorga	Girona	Granada	Torrejón	Charco del Pino	Fundación Albacete	El Olivo (Note: Runner-up of Group 6 was not allowed to play the promotion playoffs.)
2013–14	El Olivo	Oiartzun	Lleida	Santa Teresa	La Solana	Granadilla	Fundación Albacete	Sporting Plaza de Argel
2014–15	El Olivo	Oiartzun	Levante Las Planas	Real Betis	Madrid CFF	Femarguín	Sporting Plaza de Argel	Granadilla
2015–16	El Olivo	Logroño	Seagull (Note: Winners Barcelona B could not be promoted as they are a reserve team, runners-up played the promotion playoffs.)	Real Betis	Madrid CFF	Tacuense	Lorca FAD (Note: Winners Valencia B could not be promoted as they are a reserve team, runners-up played the promotion playoffs.)	Femarguín
2016–17	Oviedo Moderno	San Ignacio	Seagull	Sevilla	Madrid CFF	Femarguín	Sporting Plaza de Argel (Note: Winners and runners-up Levante B and Valencia B could not be promoted as they are reserve teams, third-placed team played the promotion playoffs.)	—N/a
2017–18	Oviedo	Logroño	Seagull	Málaga	Tacón	Femarguín	Sporting Plaza de Argel	—N/a
2018–19	Deportivo La Coruña	Osasuna	Zaragoza CFF	Santa Teresa	Tacón	Femarguín	Alhama	Juan Grande

=== As third tier ===
Season	Group I		Group II		Group III	Group IV	Group V	Group VI		Group VII	Best runner-up
2019–20	Monte		Añorga		Espanyol B	Real Betis B	La Solana	Unión Viera		Aldaia	Joventut Almassora
2020–21 (Note: Includes winners of 'mini groups' in Groups I, II and VI during temporary reconstruction due to COVID-19 pandemic travel restrictions.)	Viajes Interrías F. F.	Real Oviedo B (Note: Real Oviedo B could not be promoted as they are a reserve team of a club in the division above (Real Oviedo).)	Pradejón	Real Sociedad B	Levante Las Planas	Real Betis B	Getafe	La Garita	Geneto del Teide	Elche	—N/a
2021–22 (Note: All seven group winners and runners-up – Viajes InterRías, Osasuna B, Atlético Baleares, Torrelodones, Unión Viera and Levante B – along with the six best ranked other teams – Sárdoma, Athletic Club C, Almería, Cáceres Atlético, CD Getafe and CFF Albacete – were promoted to the Segunda Federación division as part of league reconstruction.)	Mixta Friol		Bizkerre		Europa	Málaga	Real Madrid B	Tenerife		Valencia B	13 teams
