= Girona FC Femení A =

Spanish football team

Girona FC Femení
- Full name: Girona Futbol Club Femení
- Founded: 2009 (as Sant Pere Pescador); 2020 (as Girona Senior A)
- Ground: Torres de Palau Municipal; Girona
- Capacity: 500
- Owner(s): City Football Group (44.3%); Girona Football Group (44.3%)
- Chairman: Delfí Geli
- Manager: Pau Ortega Muxach
- League: Tercera Federación
Home colours	Away colours

Girona FC Femení A, referred to by the club as Senior A, is a football team from Girona, the women's section of Girona FC. Three seasons after reviving their women's section, Girona bought the women's section of Sant Pere Pescador and renamed them.

== History ==
Although Girona FC operated a senior women's team for a number of years, financial constraints had forced them to resign to its place in Segunda División in 2013 and to cease operations in 2016. Girona FC Femení returned to competition in 2017–18, in the second division of the Catalan regional leagues, the fifth tier of women's football in Spain.

Three seasons later, the club purchased the women's section of local club Sant Pere Pescador (founded in 2009), renaming the senior team to Girona FC Senior A. The existing team was renamed Girona FC Senior B.

== Season to season ==
Season	Tier	Division	Place
2020–21	3	1ª Nacional	12th
2021–22	4	Preferente Catalana	5th
2022–23	5	Preferente Catalana	5th
2023–24	5	Preferente Catalana	3rd
2024–25	5	Preferente Catalana	3rd
2025-26	4	Tercera Federación	10th
