= CE Sant Gabriel =

Spanish football club

- Full name: Club Esportiu Sant Gabriel
- Founded: 1996; 30 years ago
- Stadium: Campo Municipal José Luis Ruiz Casado
- Capacity: 1,500
- President: Antonio Ropero
- Head coach: Antonio Camacho
- League: Primera División
- 2014–15: Primera División, 15th
- Website: cesantgabriel.com
Home colours	Away colours

Club Esportiu Sant Gabriel is a Spanish football club from Sant Adrià de Besòs, Barcelona founded in 1960. It is best known for its women's football team, founded in 1996.

In 2010 Sant Gabriel gained promotion to the national top level. In their first season they ranked 7 23 teams, qualifying for the Copa de la Reina where they reached the quarter-finals after beating Levante UD.

Sant Gabriel is also active in male formative football.

== Season to season ==
=== Men's ===
Season	Tier	Division	Place	Copa del Rey
2003–04	9	3ª Terr.	6th	
2004–05	9	3ª Terr.	10th	
2005–06	9	3ª Terr.	15th	
2006–07	9	3ª Terr.	8th	
2007–08	9	3ª Terr.	10th	

=== Women's ===
Season	Division	Place	Copa de la Reina
2001–02	2ª (Gr. 3)	5th	
2002–03	2ª (Gr. 3)	6th	
2003–04	2ª (Gr. 3)	5th	
2004–05	2ª (Gr. 3)	8th	
2005–06	2ª (Gr. 3)	7th	
2006–07	2ª (Gr. 3)	2nd	
2007–08	2ª (Gr. 3)	4th	
2008–09	2ª (Gr. 3)	2nd	
2009–10	2ª (Gr. 3)	1st	
2010–11	1ª	7th	Quarterfinals
2011–12	1ª	10th	
2012–13	1ª	8th	Quarterfinals
2013–14	1ª	9th	
2014–15	1ª	15th	
2015–16	2ª (Gr. 3)	9th	
2016–17	2ª (Gr. 3)	8th	
2017–18	2ª (Gr. 3)	9th	
2018–19	2ª (Gr. 3)	7th (Note: Due to the creation of the new Primera División B, the team remained in the same league but it became the third level.)	
2019–20	2ª		

== Current squad ==
...as of December 31, 2014 Note: Flags indicate national team as defined under FIFA eligibility rules; some limited exceptions apply. Players may hold more than one non-FIFA nationality.

No.	Pos.	Nation	Player
—	GK	ESP	Brígida Llevat
—	GK	ESP	Norma Méndez
—	DF	ESP	Cristina Becerra
—	DF	ESP	Mireia López
—	DF	ESP	Marta Muriana
—	DF	ESP	Marta Villarejo
—	DF	ESP	Eva Llamas
—	DF	ESP	Helena Serrano
—	DF	ESP	Laura Díaz
—	DF	ESP	Paola Soldevilla
—	MF	ESP	Judith Fernández
—	MF	ESP	Andrea García

No.	Pos.	Nation	Player
—	MF	ESP	Ester Gimeno
—	MF	ESP	Carola García
—	MF	ESP	Aroa León
—	MF	ESP	Nelly Maestro
—	MF	ESP	Leticia Sevilla
—	MF	ESP	Marta Turmo
—	FW	ESP	Laura Benito
—	FW	ESP	Carla Gómez
—	FW	ESP	Gloria Pelegrí
—	FW	ESP	Gemma Plà
—	FW	JPN	Asako Sakurabayashi

=== Former internationals ===
- Switzerland: Marina Keller
