= Real Unión de Tenerife (women) =

Real Unión de Tenerife's women's association football section

- Full name: Real Unión de Tenerife
- Founded: 1998; 28 years ago (as Unión Deportiva Tacuense)
- Ground: Pablos Abril, San Cristóbal de La Laguna, Canary Islands, Spain
- Chairman: Raquel Delgado
- Manager: Ayoze Díaz
- League: Segunda División Pro
- Website: udtacuense.com
Home colours	Away colours

Unión de Tenerife (also known as Real Unión de Tenerife Tacuense) is a Spanish women's football team based in Tenerife that play in Segunda División Pro. It is the women's section of Real Unión de Tenerife. They were founded in 1998, and currently plays their home matches at the Campo de Fútbol Pablos Abril.

== History ==
Logo of former UD Tacuense.

In 2002 UD Tacuense promoted to Segunda División. Fourteen seasons later, on 22 June 2016, Tacuense promoted to Primera División. They were relegated again at the end of the 2016–17 Primera División season.

On 12 August 2020, Tacuense merged with Real Unión de Tenerife and was integrated into its structure. In its first season, the main women's squad will play with the name of "Real Unión de Tenerife Tacuense".

== Season to season ==
Season	Div.	Pos.	Copa de la Reina
2002–03	2ª	5th	
2003–04	2ª	5th	
2004–05	2ª	2nd	
2005–06	2ª	5th	
2006–07	2ª	2nd	
2007–08	2ª	2nd	
2008–09	2ª	1st	
2009–10	2ª	2nd	
2010–11	2ª	1st	
2011–12	2ª	1st	
2012–13	2ª	2nd	
2013–14	2ª	2nd	
2014–15	2ª	2nd	
2015–16	2ª	1st	
2016–17	1ª	16th	
2017–18	2ª	1st	
2018–19	2ª	2nd (Note: The team qualified to move up to the new Segunda División Pro but remained in the second tier of the system due to its creation.)	
2019–20	2ªP	15th	
2020–21	2ªP	4th / 6th	
