= List of Oiartzun KE seasons =

This is a list of seasons played by Oiartzun KE, a Spanish women's football club from Oiartzun that has been active since the 1980s.

== Summary ==
Champions	Runners-up	Promoted	Relegated

Domestic and international results of Oiartzun KE
Season	League										Cup	Europe	League top scorers					
Season	Tier	Division	Pos	P	W	D	L	F	A	Pts	Cup	Europe	1st	Goal	2nd	Goal	3rd	Goal
1985–86											RU		?					
1986–87											W		?					
1987–88											W		?					
1988–89											SF		?					
1989–90											?		?					
1990–91	1	Liga Nacional	1	14	9	2	3	45	22	37	QF		?					
1991–92	1	Liga Nacional	3	13	7	1	5	36	19	15	QF		?					
1992–93	2	Liga Nacional (Gr. 1)	2	10	8	1	1	38	5	17	R16		?					
1993–94	2	Liga Nacional (Gr. 1)	?	?	?	?	?	?	?	?	QF		?					
1994–95	2	Liga Nacional (Gr. 1)	?	?	?	?	?	?	?	?	R16		?					
1995–96	2	Liga Nacional (Gr. 1)	?	?	?	?	?	?	?	?	SF		?					
1996–97	1	Liga Nacional (Gr. 1)	2	28	21	2	5	102	31	65	SF		?					
1997–98	1	Liga Nacional (Gr. 1)	4	24	14	4	6	66	33	46			?					
1998–99	1	Liga Nacional (Gr. 1)	10	22	9	6	11	61	63	33			?					
1999–00	1	Liga Nacional (Gr. 1)	4	22	10	5	7	58	38	35			?					
2000–01	1	Liga Nacional (Gr. 1)	3	24	15	6	3	104	34	51			?					
2001–02	2	Primera Nacional (Gr. 1)	5	26	14	3	9	79	44	45			?					
2002–03	2	Primera Nacional (Gr. 1)	6	26	12	4	10	85	50	40			?					
2003–04	2	Primera Nacional (Gr. 1)	1	26	21	2	3	96	18	65			?					
2004–05	2	Primera Nacional (Gr. 1)	4	26	13	4	9	50	48	43			?					
2005–06	2	Primera Nacional (Gr. 1)	7	24	10	3	11	43	39	33			?					
2006–07	2	Primera Nacional (Gr. 1)	9	26	9	5	12	29	42	32			?					
2007–08	2	Primera Nacional (Gr. 1)	3	26	14	5	7	52	40	47			?					
2008–09	2	Primera Nacional (Gr. 1)	1	26	20	3	3	78	18	63			?					
2009–10	2	Primera Nacional (Gr. 1)	2	26	18	4	4	62	25	58			?					
2010–11	2	Primera Nacional (Gr. 1)	3	24	14	4	6	41	19	46			?					
2011–12	2	Segunda División (Gr. 2)	2	26	17	5	4	61	15	56			?					
2012–13	2	Segunda División (Gr. 2)	2	26	20	2	4	105	27	62			?					
2013–14	2	Segunda División (Gr. 2)	2	26	18	3	5	86	23	57			?					
2014–15	2	Segunda División (Gr. 2)	1	26	22	4	0	111	13	70			?					
2015–16	1	Primera División	14	30	6	6	18	24	67	24			?					
2016–17	1	Primera División	15	30	4	6	20	23	74	18			(Spain) González	5	(Spain) Peña	3	(Spain) Arranz ^{N}	3
