= List of Levante UD Femenino seasons =

This is a list of seasons played by Levante UD Femenino, Levante UD's women's section, in Spanish and European football, from its first appearance in the national championship as San Vicente CFF in 1994 to the latest completed season. The team first played as Levante UD in the 1998–99 season.

== Summary ==
Champions	Runners-up	Promoted	Relegated

Season	League										Cup	Supercup	UWCL	Top scorer	
Season	Tier	Div	Pos	Pld	W	D	L	GF	GA	Pts	Cup	Supercup	UWCL	Name(s)	Goal
1994–95	2	2ª	5th	17	9	2	6	40	27	29					
1995–96	2	2ª	3rd	14	9	3	2	41	19	30					
1996–97	1	1ª	1st	26	21	3	2	120	24	66					
1997–98	1	1ª	3rd	26	21	2	3	120	16	65	Quarterfinals				
1998–99	1	1ª	3rd	26	21	2	3	111	19	65					
1999–00	1	1ª	1st	24	23	1	0	176	6	70	Champion				
2000–01	1	1ª	1st	26	26	0	0	234	6	78	Champion				
2001–02	1	1ª	1st	20	19	0	1	109	12	57	Champion		Round of 32		
2002–03	1	1ª	2nd	22	18	1	3	100	11	55	Semifinals		Round of 32		
2003–04	1	1ª	3rd	26	18	4	4	75	19	58	Champion				
2004–05	1	1ª	2nd	26	20	3	3	74	18	63	Champion				
2005–06	1	1ª	3rd	24	17	4	3	65	15	55	Semifinals				
2006–07	1	1ª	3rd	26	16	7	3	76	25	55	Champion				
2007–08	1	1ª	1st	26	23	2	1	64	10	71	Runner-up			(Spain) Laura del Río	16
2008–09	1	1ª	2nd	30	24	4	2	86	17	76	Quarterfinals		Round of 16	(Italy) Pamela Conti (Spain) Laura del Río	16
2009–10	1	1ª	8th	26	8	5	13	29	46	29	Quarterfinals			(Spain) Neus Motoso	7
2010–11	1	1ª	9th	26	17	2	7	57	22	53	Round of 16			(Italy) Pamela Conti	11
2011–12	1	1ª	5th	34	19	11	4	63	27	68				(Spain) Alexia Putellas	16
2012–13	1	1ª	4th	30	21	2	7	53	21	65	Semifinals			(Spain) Ana Buceta	11
2013–14	1	1ª	5th	30	14	9	7	38	29	51	Semifinals			(Spain) Alharilla Casado (Spain) Olga García	6
2014–15	1	1ª	5th	30	15	10	5	60	25	55	Quarterfinals			(Spain) Adriana Martín	23
2015–16	1	1ª	4th	30	16	6	8	56	38	54	Semifinals			(Mexico) Charlyn Corral	22
2016–17	1	1ª	4th	30	18	3	9	53	49	57	Quarterfinals			(Mexico) Charlyn Corral	20
2017–18	1	1ª	8th	30	11	5	14	49	50	38	Quarterfinals			(Mexico) Charlyn Corral	24
2018–19	1	1ª	3rd	30	17	6	7	52	26	57	Quarterfinals			(Mexico) Charlyn Corral	20
2019–20	1	1ª	3rd	21	14	3	4	40	21	45	Round of 16	Semifinals		(Spain) Eva Navarro (Spain) Alba Redondo	8
2020–21	1	1ª	3rd	34	21	7	6	68	44	70	Runner-up	Runner-up		(Spain) Esther González	29
2021–22	1	1ª	6th	30	15	5	10	52	39	50	Quarterfinals	Semifinals	Round 2	(Spain) Alba Redondo	12
2022–23	1	1ª	3rd	30	21	3	6	80	34	66	Round of 16			(Spain) Alba Redondo	27
2023–24	1	1ª	4th	30	17	9	4	59	28	60	Quarterfinals	Runner-up	Round 1	(Spain) Alba Redondo	16
2024–25	1	1ª	12th	30	8	7	15	30	45	31	Quarterfinals			(Colombia) Ivonne Chacón	11
