= List of women's football clubs in Spain =

This is a list of women's football clubs in Spain, for men's football clubs, see the list of football clubs in Spain.

== By ranking in the top tier ==
Starting from the creation of the Superliga in the 2001–02 and last updated at the end of the 2016–17 season.

- Athletic Bilbao
- Levante UD
- RCD Espanyol
- Rayo Vallecano
- FC Barcelona
- Atlético Madrid
- Real Sociedad
- CD Transportes Alcaine / Zaragoza CFF
- Sporting Huelva
- DSV Colegio Alemán / Valencia CF
- AD Torrejón
- CFF Puebla / Extremadura FCF / Extremadura UD
- Oviedo Moderno / Real Oviedo
- CD Híspalis
- UD Collerense
- UE L'Estartit
- CE Sant Gabriel
- Estudiantes Huelva
- CE Sabadell
- Sevilla FC
- Santa Teresa CD
- Atlético Málaga / Málaga CF
- UD Granadilla
- CF Pozuelo
- CD Nuestra Señora de Belén
- SP Comarca Llanos de Olivenza / CFF Badajoz-Olivenza / CD Badajoz
- Albacete Balompié
- Levante Las Planas
- UD Las Palmas
- SD Reocín
- Oiartzun KE
- Real Betis
- Granada CF
- Real Valladolid
- Peña Nuestra Señora de la Antigua
- FVPR El Olivo
- UD Tacuense
- SD Eibar

== Alphabetically ==
=== A ===
- Abanto Club
- CD Achaman Santa Lucía
- CD Aguere
- CFF Albacete
- EFF Alcobendas
- Algaidas CD
- Agüimes CF
- CD Amigos del Duero
- Añorga KKE
- CD Arguineguín
- Atlético Arousana
- Athletic Club
- Atlético Madrid
- Atlético Málaga
- Atlético Monachil
- CD Aurrerá Vitoria

=== B ===
- CFF Badajoz
- FC Barcelona

=== C ===
- CFF Cáceres
- Casa Social Católica Ávila
- Cerdanyola del Vallés FC
- CD Charco del Pino
- CD Ciudad Jardín
- UD Collerense
- AD Colmenar Viejo
- SP Comarca Llanos Olivenza
- AD Cornella de Terrí

=== E ===
- SD Eibar
- FVPR El Olivo
- Erizana CF
- RCD Espanyol
- CE Europa

=== G ===
- Gimnàstic Tarragona
- Gijón FF
- Girona CF
- Granada CF
- Gure Txokoa SCRD

=== H ===
- CD Hispalis

=== J ===
- Real Jaén CF

=== L ===
- SD Lagunak
- Langreo Femenino
- UD Las Palmas
- León FF
- UE L'Estartit
- Levante UD
- UE Lleida

=== M ===
- CFF Marítim
- CD Miguelturreño
- CD Movera

=== N ===
- CD Nuestra Señora de Belén

=== O ===
- Oiartzun KE
- CD Orientación Marítima
- CA Osasuna
- Oviedo Moderno CF

=== P ===
- CA Paguera
- Peluquería Mixta Friol
- Polvoritense UD
- CD Ponferrada
- Pontevedra CF
- CF Pozuelo de Alarcón
- CF Puebla Extremadura

=== R ===
- AD La Rambla
- Rayo Vallecano
- Real Sociedad
- SD Reocin

=== S ===
- CE Sabadell
- CE Sant Gabriel
- AD San Juan
- San Juan Pamplona
- SD San Ignacio
- CD Santa María de la Vega
- CD San Pío X
- Sevilla FC
- La Solana CFF
- Sporting Atlético Ciutat
- Sporting Gijón
- Sporting Huelva
- Sporting CF Plaza de Argel

=== T ===
- UD Tacuense
- CD Tarsa
- AD Torrejón CF
- UD Las Torres
- AD Trujillo

=== U ===
- Ufeco Mezquita CF
- La Unión Femenina Manises FC
- CF Unión Viera
- Universidad Las Palmas CF

=== V ===
- Valencia CF
- Real Valladolid CF
- Valvanera CD
- UE Vic

=== Z ===
- CD Zarauz
- Zaragoza CFF
