= 1989 Copa de la Reina de Fútbol =

Tournament details
- Country: Spain

The 1989 Copa de S.M. La Reina de Fútbol was the sixth edition of the Spanish women's football competition previously known as Campeonato Nacional de Fútbol Femenino and the first one under this name. Due to the launching of a national league (Liga Nacional) in this season the competition lost its status as a national championship to become the country's national cup.

Ten teams took part in the competition, which took place from 14 May to 25 June 1989. Liga Nacional runner-up Parque Alcobendas won the competition by beating Añorga KKE 4–2 in the final, which was held in Logroño's Las Gaunas just before the 1988–89 Copa del Rey Juvenil's final. Defending champion Oiartzun KE was defeated by local rival Añorga in the semifinals.

== Results ==
=== First round ===
Team 1	Agg.	Team 2	1st leg	2nd leg
Torroella	7–1	San Vicente	2–0	5–1
Athenas	?–?	Publisport	?–?	4–2
Sporting Castellón	Walkover	Espanyol		

=== Quarter-finals ===
Team 1	Agg.	Team 2	1st leg	2nd leg
Parque Alcobendas	12–2	Torroella	8–0	4–2
Espanyol	3–3 (p)	Tradehi	2–1	1–2
Añorga	15–0	Racing Principado	8–0	7–0
Oiartzun	11–0	Athenas	8–0	3–0

=== Semifinals ===
Team 1	Agg.	Team 2	1st leg	2nd leg
Parque Alcobendas	?–?	Torroella	?–?	2–1
Añorga	3–2	Oiartzun	2–0	1–2

=== Final ===
June 25, 1989

Parque Alcobendas	4 – 2	Añorga

Las Gaunas, Logroño
