= 1996–97 Liga Nacional de Fútbol Femenino =

Liga Nacional
- Season: 1996–97
- Champions: San Vicente (1st title)

The 1996–97 Liga Nacional de Fútbol Femenino was the 10th season of the Spanish women's football first division. San Vicente won its first title.

== Group 1 ==
Pos	Team	Pld	W	D	L	GF	GA	GD	Pts	Qualification or relegation
1	Añorga	28	22	5	1	110	25	+85	71	Qualification to the Final Four
2	Oiartzun	28	21	2	5	102	31	+71	65	Qualification to the Copa de la Reina
3	Sondika	28	19	6	3	85	29	+56	63	Qualification to the Copa de la Reina
4	Eibartarrak	28	18	6	4	91	28	+63	60	
5	Lagunak	28	19	3	6	72	32	+40	60	
6	Lagun Onak	28	12	4	12	61	62	−1	40	
7	Bilbao	28	12	3	13	59	61	−2	39	
8	Mondragón	28	11	4	13	52	67	−15	37	
9	Anaitasuna	28	10	6	12	47	52	−5	36	
10	Trofeo La Amistad	28	10	3	15	49	60	−11	33	
11	Gernika	28	7	8	13	36	56	−20	29	
12	Bizkerre	28	8	5	15	46	67	−21	29	
13	San Juan	28	6	2	20	49	117	−68	20	Relegated
14	Amaya	28	2	5	21	24	109	−85	11	Relegated
15	Ikesi	28	1	2	25	20	107	−87	5	Relegated

Source: Arquero-Arba
Rules for classification: 1) Points; 2) Goal difference; 3) Number of goals scored

== Group 2 ==
Pos	Team	Pld	W	D	L	GF	GA	GD	Pts	Qualification
1	Guillén Lafuerza	20	18	0	2	83	16	+67	54	Qualification to the Final Four
2	Butarque	20	15	2	3	66	17	+49	47	Qualification to the Copa de la Reina
3	Oroquieta Villaverde	19	14	3	2	83	24	+59	45	Qualification to the Copa de la Reina
4	León	20	11	4	5	74	41	+33	37	
5	Olímpico Fortuna	18	10	2	6	66	36	+30	32	
6	Tradehi Oviedo	20	6	4	10	29	48	−19	22	
7	Rayo Burgalés	20	5	5	10	33	56	−23	20	
8	La Amistad	20	5	5	10	23	38	−15	20	
9	Sporting Gijón	19	5	4	10	31	48	−17	19	
10	Legamadrid	20	3	3	14	23	78	−55	12	
11	Trobajo del Camino	20	0	0	20	11	120	−109	0	

Source: Arquero-Arba
Rules for classification: 1) Points; 2) Goal difference; 3) Number of goals scored

== Group 3 ==
Pos	Team	Pld	W	D	L	GF	GA	GD	Pts	Qualification
1	San Vicente	26	21	3	2	120	24	+96	66	Qualification to the Final Four
2	Sabadell	26	21	2	3	123	34	+89	65	Qualification to the Copa de la Reina
3	Espanyol	26	19	4	3	105	24	+81	61	Qualification to the Copa de la Reina
4	CF Barcelona	26	20	1	5	103	28	+75	61	
5	Llers	26	17	4	5	94	30	+64	55	
6	Cornellà	26	17	3	6	86	25	+61	54	
7	Tortosa	26	12	2	12	55	81	−26	38	
8	Torrent	26	9	2	15	60	74	−14	29	
9	El Raval	26	7	4	15	47	91	−44	25	
10	Athenas	26	7	3	16	19	57	−38	24	
11	Pardinyes	26	7	3	16	27	84	−57	24	
12	77 Taxonera	26	3	1	22	34	125	−91	10	Relegated
13	Trinitat	26	1	6	19	26	87	−61	9	Relegated
14	Deltebre	26	1	2	23	29	164	−135	5	Relegated

Source: Arquero-Arba
Rules for classification: 1) Points; 2) Goal difference; 3) Number of goals scored

== Final four ==
The Final Four was played between the four group winners. Finally, the title was won by San Vicente.

Pos	Team	Pld	W	D	L	GF	GA	GD	Pts	SVI	AÑO	GUI	HIS
1	San Vicente (C)	6	5	0	1	14	8	+6	15	—	2–1	3–2	3–1
2	Añorga	6	3	1	2	15	7	+8	10	2–1	—	3–0	7–1
3	Guillén Lafuerza	6	1	2	3	8	11	−3	5	1–2	0–0	—	3–1
4	Híspalis	6	1	1	4	9	20	−11	4	1–3	3–2	2–2	—

Source: Arquero-Arba
Rules for classification: 1) Points; 2) Goal difference; 3) Number of goals scored
(C) Champions
