= 1997–98 Liga Nacional de Fútbol Femenino =

Liga Nacional
- Season: 1997–98
- Champions: Atlético Málaga (1st title)

The 1997–98 Liga Nacional de Fútbol Femenino was the 11th season of the Spanish women's football first division. Atlético Málaga won its first title.

== Group 1 ==
Pos	Team	Pld	W	D	L	GF	GA	GD	Pts	Qualification or relegation
1	Sondika	24	22	1	1	89	31	+58	67	Qualification to the Final Four
2	Eibartarrak	24	17	3	4	81	36	+45	54	
3	Lagunak	24	16	2	6	93	37	+56	50	
4	Oiartzun	24	14	4	6	66	33	+33	46	
5	Corella	24	12	3	9	33	38	−5	39	
6	Trofeo La Amistad	24	9	6	9	53	52	+1	33	
7	Mondragón	24	10	2	12	44	63	−19	32	
8	Añorga	24	8	5	11	51	42	+9	29	
9	Bilbao	24	7	5	12	63	74	−11	26	
10	Lagun Onak	24	6	8	10	44	51	−7	26	
11	Anaitasuna	24	7	5	12	48	53	−5	26	
12	Elgoibar	24	4	4	16	38	89	−51	16	Relegated
13	Gernika	24	0	0	24	13	117	−104	0	Relegated

Source: Arquero-Arba
Rules for classification: 1) Points; 2) Goal difference; 3) Number of goals scored

== Group 2 ==
Olímpico Fortuna and Gavilán retired during the season and all their matches were invalidated.

Pos	Team	Pld	W	D	L	GF	GA	GD	Pts	Qualification
1	Oroquieta Villaverde	22	21	0	1	123	18	+105	63	Qualification to the Final Four
2	Madrid Oeste	22	16	4	2	80	23	+57	52	Qualification to the Copa de la Reina
3	Butarque	22	13	6	3	73	19	+54	45	Qualification to the Copa de la Reina
4	Nuestra Señora de Belén	22	10	6	6	49	33	+16	36	
5	Sporting Gijón	22	10	5	7	49	44	+5	35	
6	La Amistad	22	9	6	7	32	32	0	33	
7	Guillén Lafuerza	22	8	4	10	51	74	−23	28	
8	León	22	6	6	10	45	53	−8	24	
9	Peña Azul Oviedo	22	5	6	11	26	47	−21	21	
10	Ribert	22	3	7	12	22	57	−35	16	
11	Legamadrid	22	4	2	16	34	69	−35	14	Relegated
12	Luarca	22	0	2	20	7	122	−115	2	Relegated

Source: Arquero-Arba
Rules for classification: 1) Points; 2) Goal difference; 3) Number of goals scored

== Group 3 ==
Pos	Team	Pld	W	D	L	GF	GA	GD	Pts	Qualification
1	San Vicente	25	21	2	2	102	14	+88	65	Qualification to the Final Four
2	CF Barcelona	25	20	3	2	137	25	+112	63	
3	Espanyol	25	19	5	1	119	15	+104	62	
4	Sabadell	25	17	3	5	76	24	+52	54	
5	Cornellà	25	13	7	5	83	28	+55	46	
6	L'Estartit	25	13	3	9	53	50	+3	42	
7	Llers	25	13	2	10	74	70	+4	41	
8	Tortosa	25	7	5	13	49	71	−22	26	
9	Pardinyes	25	7	5	13	40	71	−31	26	
10	Terrassa	25	6	3	16	40	92	−52	21	
11	Athenas	25	5	3	17	30	63	−33	18	
12	Torrent	25	3	4	18	25	96	−71	13	Relegated
13	Plaza	25	2	1	22	30	139	−109	7	Relegated
14	El Raval (Note: Retired from competition) (D)	13	0	0	13	2	102	−100	0	Retired from competition

Source: Arquero-Arba
Rules for classification: 1) Points; 2) Goal difference; 3) Number of goals scored
(D) Disqualified

== Group 4 ==
Pos	Team	Pld	W	D	L	GF	GA	GD	Pts	Qualification
1	Atlético Málaga	10	10	0	0	41	1	+40	30	Qualification to the Final Four
2	Juval	10	5	3	2	20	14	+6	18	
3	Atlético Jiennense	10	6	0	4	27	18	+9	18	
4	El Palo	10	3	2	5	12	18	−6	11	
5	Eurosol	10	2	1	7	9	31	−22	7	
6	Motril	10	0	2	8	2	29	−27	2	

Source: Arquero-Arba
Rules for classification: 1) Points; 2) Goal difference; 3) Number of goals scored

== Final four ==
The Final Four was played on 8 and 10 May 1998 between the four group winners.

Semifinals
San Vicente (p)	2
Sondika	2
Atlético Málaga	1
Oroquieta Villaverde	0

Final
San Vicente	0
Atlético Málaga	2
