= Romy Salvador =

French footballer (born 1998)

Personal information
- Full name: Romane Marie Salvador
- Date of birth: 9 May 1998 (age 28)
- Position: Goalkeeper

Romane Marie Salvador (born 9 May 1998) is a French professional footballer who plays as a goalkeeper for Liga F club RCD Espanyol. She previously played for Montpellier.
