= RCD Espanyol Femení =

Spanish football team

Espanyol Femení
- Full name: Reial Club Deportiu Espanyol de Barcelona SAD Femenino
- Nicknames: Periquitos, españolistas
- Founded: 1970; 56 years ago
- Stadium: Ciutat Esportiva Dani Jarque
- Capacity: 1,520
- President: Alan Pace
- Head coach: Sara Monforte
- League: Liga F
- 2025–26: 11th
- Website: rcdespanyol.com/femenino
Home colours	Away colours	Third colours

RCD Espanyol Femení (Real Club Deportivo Español) is the women's football section of RCD Espanyol and was founded in 1970.

== History ==
RCD Espanyol was one of the pioneering teams in women's football in Spain, playing its first match as early as 1970. In 1971 they were one of the four major Catalan teams to take part in the Catalan Pernod Cup, playing to over 40,000 at Sarrià Stadium and 30,000 at the Camp Nou; Espanyol lifted the cup by defeating rivals Barcelona in the final. By 1979 Espanyol had won the (Catalan) league six times and the cup twice.

The team's first national success came in 1989, when they first reached the national cup's final, losing it against Añorga. They won the competition for the first time in 1996, and successfully defended the title the following year.

2006 was their most successful season to date as they won their first (and for now only) league title and their third Queen's Cup. Thus Espanyol took part in the UEFA Women's Cup the following season.

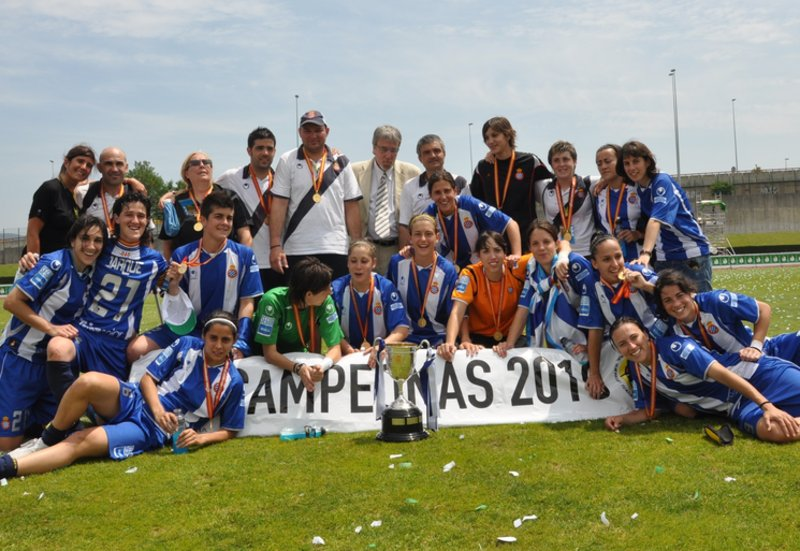
Espanyol players celebrating the 2010 Copa de la Reina title.

In the late 2000s to the early 2010s, Espanyol consolidated itself as one of Spain's top teams. It has been most successful in the Copa de la Reina, winning three titles in 2009, 2010, and 2012, tying with Levante UD as the competition's most successful team. In the late 2010s, they consistently finished in the middle/bottom half of the league table and flirted with relegation multiple times.

Espanyol had its worst-ever finish in the league when they ended the 2019–20 season in 16th place, winning none of their 21 matches and losing 16. They avoided relegation to the Reto Iberdrola when the RFEF decided that there would be no relegations for the season due to suspension of the league brought on by the COVID-19 pandemic. The 2020–21 season marked Espanyol's 50th year of existence for their women's team. That season, Espanyol were relegated to the Reto Iberdrola for the first time in their history, finishing 16th out of 18 in the league table. They failed to be promoted back immediately on the final matchday of the 2021–22 season, losing 3–0 to fellow Catalan club Levante Las Planas, who took the title instead.

== Competition record ==
=== Season to season ===
Season	Div.	Pos.	Copa de la Reina	Champions League
1988–89	1ª	3rd	Quarterfinals	
1989–90	1ª	3rd	Runner-up	
1990–91	2ª	5th	Round of 16	
1991–92	2ª	3rd		
1992–93	2ª	1st	Round of 16	
1993–94	1ª	5th	Round of 16	
1994–95	1ª	3rd	Semifinalist	
1995–96	1ª	3rd	Champion	
1996–97	1ª	3rd	Champion	
1997–98	1ª	3rd	Semifinalist	
1998–99	1ª	3rd		
1999–00	1ª	2nd	First round	
2000–01	1ª	2nd	Quarterfinals	
2001–02	1ª	3rd	Runner-up	
2002–03	1ª	7th	Quarterfinals	
2003–04	1ª	8th		
2004–05	1ª	3rd	Quarterfinals	
2005–06	1ª	1st	Champion	
2006–07	1ª	2nd	Runner-up	Group stage
2007–08	1ª	4th	Quarterfinals	
2008–09	1ª	4th	Champion	
2009–10	1ª	2nd	Champion	
2010–11	1ª	2nd	Runner-up	
2011–12	1ª	3rd	Champion	
2012–13	1ª	5th	Quarterfinals	
2013–14	1ª	11th		
2014–15	1ª	7th	Quarterfinals	
2015–16	1ª	9th		
2016–17	1ª	13th		
2017–18	1ª	14th		
2018–19	1ª	9th	Round of 16	
2019–20	1ª	16th	Round of 16	
2020–21	1ª	16th		
2021–22	2ªP	2nd	Round of 16	
2022–23	2ªP	9th		
2023–24	2ªP	3rd (PO winner)		
2024–25	1ª	11th	Second round	
2025–26	1ª	11th	Round of 16	

=== Record in UEFA competitions ===
Season	Competition	Stage	Opponent	Result	Scorers
2006–07	UEFA Women's Cup	Qualifying Stage	(Scotland) Hibernian LFC (France) FCF Juvisy (Faroe Islands) KÍ	4–1; 1–0; 7–0	Adriana 2, Cubí, Serna; Rubio; Cubí 4, Adriana 2, Diéguez
2006–07	UEFA Women's Cup	Group Stage	(Norway) Kolbotn IL (Sweden) Umeå IK (Ukraine) Lehenda Chernihiv	2–4; 0–3; 5–0	Adriana + 1 o.g. Serna 2, Adriana, Cubí, Rubio

== Titles ==
=== Official ===
- Primera División
  - 2005–06: 1
- Copa de la Reina
  - 1995–96, 1996–97, 2005–06, 2008–09, 2009–10, 2011–12: 6
- Copa Catalunya
  - 2005, 2006, 2007, 2008, 2013: 5

=== Invitational ===
- Pyrénées Cup
  - 2006, 2007: 2

== Players ==
=== Current squad ===
As of 2 July 2026.

Note: Flags indicate national team as defined under FIFA eligibility rules; some limited exceptions apply. Players may hold more than one non-FIFA nationality.

No.	Pos.	Nation	Player
1	GK	FRA	Romane Salvador
5	DF	ESP	Lucía Vallejo
6	MF	ESP	Mar Torrás
9	FW	ESP	Anita Marcos
10	MF	ESP	Cristina Baudet
11	FW	ESP	Ona Baradad
13	GK	ESP	Meri Muñoz
15	MF	ESP	Laura Martínez
17	MF	ESP	Naima García
19	FW	ESP	Paula Arana

No.	Pos.	Nation	Player
20	MF	ESP	Anna Torrodà
21	DF	ESP	Júlia Guerra
23	FW	SKN	Phoenetia Browne
26	GK	ESP	Paula Coba
29	FW	ESP	Ainhoa Domènech
30	MF	ESP	Aina Durán
32	MF	ESP	Camila Reinaldo
34	FW	ESP	Lucía Loras
35	DF	ESP	Ariadna Domènech

== See also ==
- Derbi Femení
