= Ana Ruiz Mitxelena =

Spanish footballer (1967–1993)

Ana Ruiz
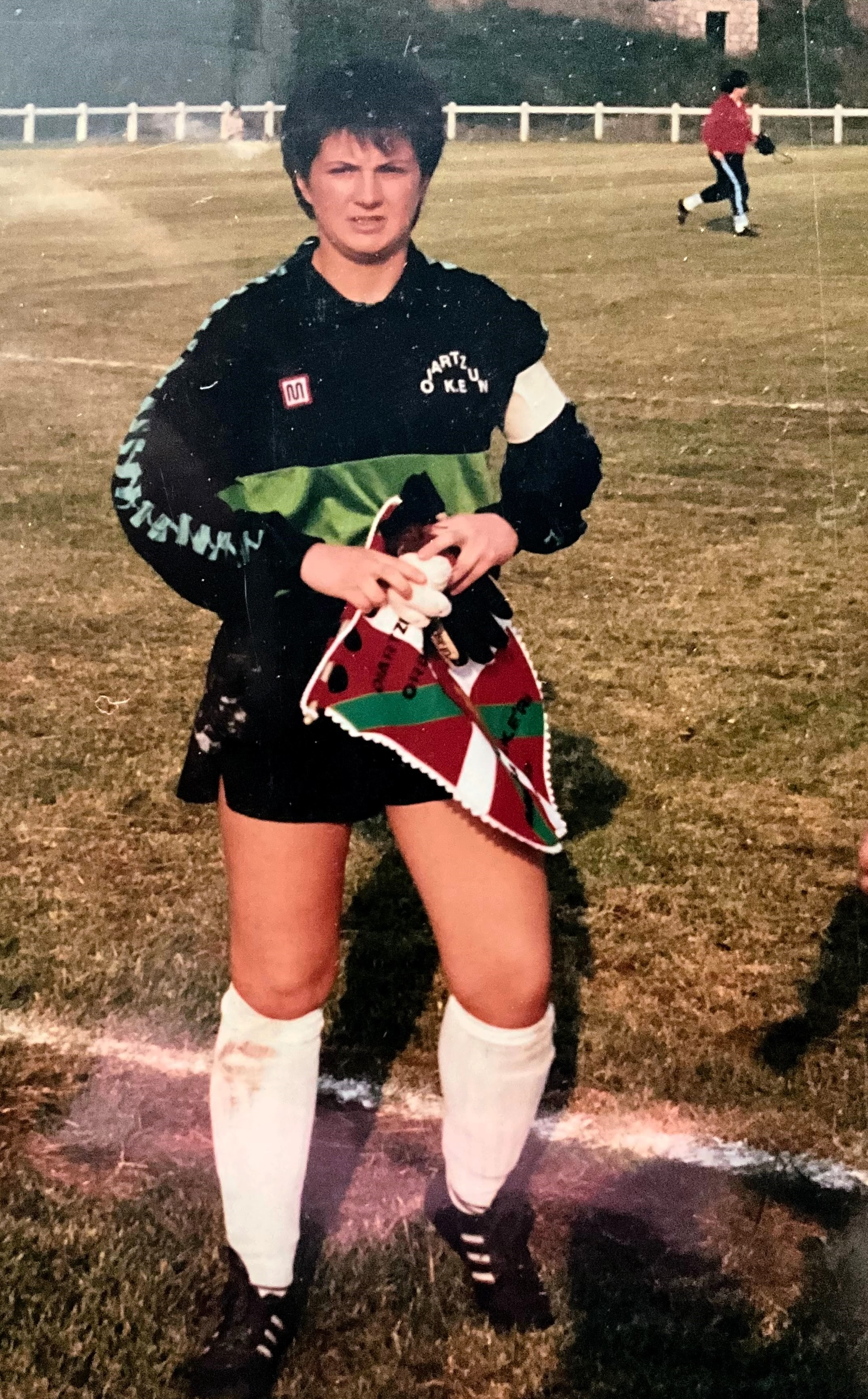

Personal information
- Full name: Ana Ruiz Mitxelena
- Date of birth: 2 September 1967
- Place of birth: San Sebastián, Spain
- Date of death: 29 November 1993 (aged 26)
- Place of death: Irurtzun, Spain
- Height: 1.69 m (5 ft 7 in)
- Position: Goalkeeper

Youth career
- 1982–1983: Beach soccer

Senior career*
Years	Team	Apps	(Gls)
1983–1988	Oiartzun KE		
1989–1992	CD Sampedrotarra		

International career
1984–1988	Spain	15	(0)
1990–1993	Spain futsal		
- * Club domestic league appearances and goals

Ana Ruiz Mitxelena (2 September 1967 – 29 November 1993) was a Spanish football goalkeeper.

As an international (the first player from Gipuzkoa province and the first goalkeeper from the Basque region to be selected) she featured for the Spain women's national football team (1984 to 1988) and the Spain women's national futsal team.

Ana died in a road accident aged 26. She became the first Spanish women's international footballer to die
