= 1998–99 Liga Nacional de Fútbol Femenino =

The 1998–99 Liga Nacional de Fútbol Femenino was the 12th season of the Spanish women's football first division. Irex Puebla won its first title.

== Competition format ==
Teams were divided into four groups of 14 teams each one. The four group winners would qualify to the Final Four for deciding the league champion.

== Group 1 ==
Pos	Team	Pld	W	D	L	GF	GA	GD	Pts	Qualification or relegation
1	Eibartarrak	26	20	4	2	106	32	+74	64	Qualification to the Final Four
2	Lagunak	26	16	8	2	80	33	+47	56	
3	Sondika	26	17	5	4	74	35	+39	56	
4	Anaitasuna	26	11	5	10	59	68	−9	38	
5	Lagun Onak	26	11	4	11	41	48	−7	37	
6	Bilbao	26	10	7	9	52	42	+10	37	
7	Bizkerre	26	10	5	11	53	57	−4	35	
8	Trofeo La Amistad	26	11	2	13	43	57	−14	35	
9	Añorga	26	8	9	9	40	46	−6	33	
10	Oiartzun	26	9	6	11	61	63	−2	33	
11	Gure Txokoa	26	9	5	12	36	31	+5	32	
12	Corella	26	7	5	14	39	57	−18	26	Relegated
13	Larre	26	6	3	17	48	93	−45	21	Relegated
14	Mondragón	26	0	6	20	21	91	−70	6	Relegated

Source: Arquero-Arba
Rules for classification: 1) Points; 2) Goal difference; 3) Number of goals scored

== Group 2 ==
Pos	Team	Pld	W	D	L	GF	GA	GD	Pts	Qualification
1	Oroquieta Villaverde	20	19	1	0	82	11	+71	58	Qualification to the Final Four
2	Madrid Oeste	20	17	1	2	104	16	+88	52	
3	Butarque	20	14	3	3	65	31	+34	45	
4	Rosillo 75	20	11	3	6	64	39	+25	36	
5	Nuestra Señora de Belén	20	10	4	6	44	18	+26	34	
6	Peña Azul	20	6	2	12	33	61	−28	20	
7	Tres Cantos	20	5	4	11	36	63	−27	19	
8	Sporting Gijón	20	5	4	11	31	54	−23	19	
9	León	20	5	3	12	33	66	−33	18	
10	Ribert	20	4	3	13	27	59	−32	15	
11	La Amistad	20	0	0	20	7	108	−101	0	Relegated

Source: Arquero-Arba
Rules for classification: 1) Points; 2) Goal difference; 3) Number of goals scored

== Group 3 ==
Pos	Team	Pld	W	D	L	GF	GA	GD	Pts	Qualification
1	Espanyol	26	21	3	2	126	9	+117	66	Qualification to the Final Four
2	Llers	26	21	2	3	112	38	+74	65	
3	San Vicente	26	21	2	3	111	19	+92	65	
4	L'Estartit	26	19	2	5	103	31	+72	59	
5	CF Barcelona	26	18	3	5	99	42	+57	57	
6	Sabadell	26	14	3	9	82	52	+30	45	
7	Cornellà	26	14	3	9	52	32	+20	45	
8	Terrassa	26	8	3	15	43	70	−27	27	
9	Pardinyes	26	6	7	13	46	82	−36	25	
10	Tortosa	26	7	2	17	44	114	−70	23	
11	Blanes	26	6	3	17	35	94	−59	21	
12	Mercat Nou	26	5	2	19	27	107	−80	17	Relegated
13	Breda	26	2	3	21	30	113	−83	9	Relegated
14	Athenas	26	0	2	24	22	129	−107	2	Relegated

Source: Arquero-Arba
Rules for classification: 1) Points; 2) Goal difference; 3) Number of goals scored

== Group 4 ==
Pos	Team	Pld	W	D	L	GF	GA	GD	Pts	Qualification
1	Irex Puebla	18	16	1	1	102	13	+89	49	Qualification to the Final Four
2	Atlético Málaga	18	13	3	2	69	13	+56	42	
3	Estudiantes Huelva	18	12	2	4	52	41	+11	38	
4	Híspalis	18	12	1	5	58	36	+22	37	
5	Atlético Jiennense	18	9	4	5	42	36	+6	31	
6	Montilla CF	18	7	3	8	42	51	−9	24	
7	Juval	18	5	2	11	25	40	−15	17	
8	Eurosol	18	4	1	13	24	65	−41	13	
9	El Palo	18	2	1	15	18	78	−60	7	
10	Cortijos de Marín	18	1	0	17	21	60	−39	3	
11	Florida	0	0	0	0	0	0	0	0	Retired

Source: Arquero-Arba
Rules for classification: 1) Points; 2) Goal difference; 3) Number of goals scored

== Final four ==
The Final Four was played on 21 May and 23 May 1999

Semifinals
Oroquieta Villaverde	5
Eibartarrak	2
Puebla	3
Espanyol	2

Final
Oroquieta Villaverde	4
Puebla	1
