= 1991–92 Liga Nacional de Fútbol Femenino =

Liga Nacional
- Season: 1991–92
- Dates: 22 September 1991 – 2 February 1992
- Champions: Añorga (1st title)

The 1991–92 Liga Nacional de Fútbol Femenino was the 4th season of the Spanish women's football first division. Añorga won their first title ever.

== Teams and locations ==
Team	Location
Añorga	San Sebastián
Atlético Villa de Madrid	Madrid
CF Barcelona	Barcelona
Oiartzun	Oiartzun
Oroquieta Villaverde	Madrid
Parque Alcobendas	Alcobendas
Peña Barcilona	Barcelona
Sabadell	Sabadell

== League table ==
Pos	Team	Pld	W	D	L	GF	GA	GD	Pts
1	Añorga (C)	14	13	1	0	51	13	+38	27
2	Barcelona	14	9	1	4	38	16	+22	19
3	Oiartzun	14	8	1	5	38	19	+19	17
4	Sabadell	14	5	3	6	20	25	−5	13
5	Oroquieta Villaverde	14	4	4	6	20	24	−4	12
6	Peña Barcilona	14	4	4	6	19	27	−8	12
7	Atlético Villa de Madrid	14	3	5	6	37	45	−8	11
8	Parque Alcobendas	14	0	1	13	10	64	−54	1

Source: Arquero Arba
Rules for classification: 1) Points; 2) Head-to-head points; 3) Head-to-head goal difference; 4) Goal difference; 5) Goals scored.
(C) Champions

== Results ==
Home \ Away	AÑO	VMA	BAR	OIA	ORO	ALC	PBA	SAB
Añorga	—	2–0	2–0	2–1	2–0	8–1	4–1	5–2
Atlético Villa de Madrid	1–3	—	1–14	2–3	2–2	8–1	1–4	2–2
Barcelona	2–4	3–2	—	1–0	2–1	6–0	1–3	1–0
Oiartzun	0–3	4–5	2–0	—	6–1	4–2	4–1	6–0
Oroquieta Villaverde	1–3	3–0 (Note: Atlético Villa de Madrid did not show up.)	1–5	0–0	—	4–1	2–0	2–0
Parque Alcobendas	1–7	2–9	0–1	0–5	1–5	—	0–0	0–2
Peña Barcilona	0–3	2–2	0–1	1–3	1–1	3–2	—	0–0
Sabadell	3–3	4–2	0–2	1–0	1–0	4–0	1–2	—

Source: Arquero Arba
Legend: Blue = home team win; Yellow = draw; Red = away team win.
