= CD Oroquieta Villaverde =

Spanish football club

Oroquieta Villaverde
- Full name: Club Deportivo Oroquieta Villaverde
- Chairman: J. Antonio Hernández
- League: Regional Preferente
Home colours	Away colours

Club Deportivo Oroquieta Villaverde is a Spanish women's football club from Madrid settled in the city's Villaverde district.

== History ==
In 1989 Oroquieta Villaverde joined the second edition of the División de Honor. The team soon rose into the top positions and after winning its first National Cup in 1992. The club was further strengthened as Atlético Madrid disbanded its team, champion of the 1989–90 edition, and its best players joined its former rivals. Oroquieta won the national championship in 1993 and 1994, its second cup in 1995 and both titles in 1999.

However Oroquieta collapsed following this last success. In 2001 it was third to last in its group in the championship's preliminary stage, and next year it was left aside from the Royal Spanish Football Federation's reunified 12-teams Superliga. The team lost all 26 games in the new second tier and was relegated to the lower categories.

After the 2012–13 season, the club ceased in activity but in April 2015, Oroquieta Villaverde launched a new project for the neighbourhood.

== Season by season ==
Season	Division	Place	Copa de la Reina
1989/90	1ª	8th	
1990/91	1ª	4th	Quarterfinals
1991/92	1ª	5th	Winner
1992/93	1ª	1st	Runner-up
1993/94	1ª	1st	Runner-up
1994/95	1ª	2nd	Winner
1995/96	1ª	2nd	Runner-up
1996/97	1ª	3rd	Semifinals
1997/98	1ª	1st/SF	Semifinals
1998/99	1ª	1st	Winner
1999/00	1ª (G2)	8th	
2000/01	1ª (G2)	12th	
2001/02	2ª (G2)	14th	
2002–07	Reg.		
2008/09	1ª Reg.	7th	

Season	Division	Place	Copa de la Reina
2009/10	1ª Reg.	3rd	
2010/11	Pref.	11th	
2011/12	Pref.	5th	
2012/13	Pref.	11th	
2013–15	DNP	—	
2015/16	1ª Reg.	5th	
2016/17	1ª Reg.	4th	

== Titles ==
- División de Honor
  - 1993, 1994, 1999
- Copa de la Reina
  - 1992, 1995, 1999

== Former internationals ==
- (Spain) Isabel Candel
- (Spain) Begoña Casalengua
- (Spain) Begoña Jáuregui
- (Spain) Mar Prieto
