= Oiartzun KE =

Coordinates: 43.3000°N 1.8774°W

Oiartzun
- Full name: Oiartzun Kirol Elkartea
- Founded: 1975 / 1981 (WF)
- Ground: Karla Lekuona, Oiartzun
- Capacity: 2,000
- Chairman: Koldo Fernández
- Manager: Jon Alkorta
- League: División de Honor (men's); Primera División (women's)
- 2024–25 2016–17: División de Honor, 8th of 18; 15th (relegated)
- Website: http://oiartzunke.eus/es/
Home colours	Away colours

Oiartzun Kirol Elkartea is a Spanish football club from Oiartzun, Gipuzkoa, founded in 1975. It is best known for its women's section, established in 1981.

== History ==
Oiartzun was one of the leading teams in the first years of organized women's football in Spain, winning the national championship in 1987 and 1988 and the national league in 1991. However, in 1993 the team was relegated for financial reasons to the second tier, which became four years later the top category as the División de Honor was disbanded. Meanwhile, Oiartzun reached the semifinals of the Copa de la Reina in 1996 and 1997.

When RFEF launched the Superliga Femenina in 2001 Oiartzun was registered in second tier Primera Nacional. Oiartzun has played the promotion play-offs in four occasions but it was defeated by FC Barcelona in 2004, UD Collerense in 2009, SD Reocín in 2010 and Sevilla FC in 2012. Oiartzun finally returned to the top tier Primera División for the 2015–2016 season, but was relegated again at the end of the 2016–17 Primera División season. Its traditional rival is Añorga KKE.

== Season to season ==
=== Men's ===
Season	Tier	Division	Place	Copa del Rey
1975–76	5	1ª Reg.	7th	
1976–77	5	1ª Reg.	16th	
1977–78	6	1ª Reg.	11th	
1978–79	6	1ª Reg.	6th	
1979–80	6	1ª Reg.	2nd	
1980–81	5	Reg. Pref.	20th	
1981–82	6	1ª Reg.	4th	
1982–83	6	1ª Reg.	6th	
1983–84	6	1ª Reg.	1st	
1984–85	5	Reg. Pref.	18th	
1985–86	6	1ª Reg.	12th	
1986–87	6	1ª Reg.	3rd	
1987–88	5	Reg. Pref.	18th	
1988–89	6	1ª Reg.	9th	
1989–90	6	1ª Reg.	11th	
1990–91	6	1ª Reg.	5th	
1991–92	6	1ª Reg.	4th	
1992–93	6	1ª Reg.	5th	
1993–94	6	1ª Reg.	1st	
1994–95	5	Reg. Pref.	16th	

Season	Tier	Division	Place	Copa del Rey
1995–96	5	Reg. Pref.	8th	
1996–97	5	Reg. Pref.	9th	
1997–98	5	Reg. Pref.	11th	
1998–99	5	Reg. Pref.	3rd	
1999–2000	5	Reg. Pref.	2nd	
2000–01	5	Reg. Pref.	10th	
2001–02	5	Reg. Pref.	10th	
2002–03	5	Reg. Pref.	18th	
2003–04	6	1ª Reg.	1st	
2004–05	5	Reg. Pref.	20th	
2005–06	6	1ª Reg.	3rd	
2006–07	6	1ª Reg.	2nd	
2007–08	6	1ª Reg.	6th	
2008–09	6	1ª Reg.	1st	
2009–10	5	Div. Hon.	5th	
2010–11	5	Div. Hon.	6th	
2011–12	5	Div. Hon.	3rd	
2012–13	5	Div. Hon.	1st	
2013–14	4	3ª	15th	
2014–15	4	3ª	19th	

Season	Tier	Division	Place	Copa del Rey
2015–16	5	Div. Hon.	7th	
2016–17	5	Div. Hon.	8th	
2017–18	5	Div. Hon.	13th	
2018–19	5	Div. Hon.	8th	
2019–20	5	Div. Hon.	16th	
2020–21	5	Div. Hon.	6th	
2021–22	6	Div. Hon.	9th	
2022–23	6	Div. Hon.	3rd	
2023–24	6	Div. Hon.	10th	
2024–25	6	Div. Hon.	8th	
2025–26	6	Div. Hon.		

- 2 seasons in Tercera División

=== Women's ===
Season	Division	Place	Copa de la Reina
1985/86	—N/a		Runner-up
1986/87	—N/a		Winner
1987/88	—N/a		Winner
1988/89			Semifinals
1989/90			
1990/91	1ª	1st	Quarterfinals
1991/92	1ª	3rd	Quarterfinals
1992/93	2ª	2nd	Round of 16
1993/94	2ª	3rd	Quarterfinals
1994/95	2ª	1st	Round of 16
1995/96	2ª	1st	Semifinals
1996/97	1ª	2nd	Semifinals
1997/98	1ª	4th	
1998/99	1ª	10th	
1999/00	1ª	4th	

Season	Division	Place	Copa de la Reina
2000/01	1ª	3rd	First round
2001/02	2ª	5th	
2002/03	2ª	6th	
2003/04	2ª	1st	
2004/05	2ª	4th	
2005/06	2ª	7th	
2006/07	2ª	9th	
2007/08	2ª	3rd	
2008/09	2ª	1st	
2009/10	2ª	2nd	
2010/11	2ª	3rd	
2011/12	2ª	2nd	
2012/13	2ª	3rd	
2013/14	2ª	2nd	
2014/15	2ª	1st	

Season	Division	Place	Copa de la Reina
2015/16	1ª	14th	
2016/17	1ª	15th	
2017/18	2ª	6th	
2018/19	2ª	13th (Note: Due to the creation of the new Primera División B, the team remained in the same league but it became the third level.)	
2019/20	2ª		

== Honours ==
- Campeonato Nacional
  - 1987, 1988
- Liga Nacional
  - 1991

=== Former internationals ===
- (Spain) Eli Artola
- (Spain) María Ángeles Gil
- (Spain) Ana Ruiz
