= 2000–01 Liga Nacional de Fútbol Femenino =

Superliga
- Season: 2000–01
- Champions: Levante (2nd title)
- Matches: 668
- Top goalscorer: Auxiliadora Jiménez (58 goals)

The 2000–01 Liga Nacional de Fútbol Femenino was the 13th season of the Spanish women's football first division. Levante won its second title and earned the first Double in Spanish women's football with its Copa de la Reina win the same season.

== Competition format ==
The 56 teams were divided into four groups of 14 teams each one. The four group winners would qualify to the Final Four for deciding the league champion.

The two first teams of each group and the best third placed teams would qualify for the Copa de la Reina de Fútbol.

== Group 1 ==
| Pos | Team | Pld | W | D | L | GF | GA | GD | Pts | Qualification or relegation |
|---|---|---|---|---|---|---|---|---|---|---|
| 1 | Eibartarrak | 24 | 18 | 5 | 1 | 111 | 15 | +96 | 59 | Qualification to the Final Four |
| 2 | Lagunak | 24 | 17 | 7 | 0 | 114 | 23 | +91 | 58 | Qualification to Copa de la Reina |
| 3 | Oiartzun | 24 | 15 | 6 | 3 | 104 | 34 | +70 | 51 | |
| 4 | Añorga | 24 | 14 | 5 | 5 | 76 | 24 | +52 | 47 | |
| 5 | Corella | 24 | 13 | 5 | 6 | 49 | 30 | +19 | 44 | |
| 6 | Lagun Onak | 24 | 11 | 7 | 6 | 60 | 45 | +15 | 40 | |
| 7 | Bizkerre | 24 | 8 | 8 | 8 | 59 | 40 | +19 | 32 | |
| 8 | Bilbao | 24 | 8 | 5 | 11 | 38 | 47 | −9 | 29 | |
| 9 | Anaitasuna | 24 | 7 | 5 | 12 | 39 | 54 | −15 | 26 | |
| 10 | Zarautz | 24 | 6 | 4 | 14 | 33 | 52 | −19 | 22 | |
| 11 | Retuerto | 24 | 5 | 3 | 16 | 35 | 83 | −48 | 18 | |
| 12 | Mutriku | 24 | 2 | 3 | 19 | 33 | 87 | −54 | 9 | |
| 13 | Gazteria | 24 | 0 | 1 | 23 | 13 | 230 | −217 | 1 | |
| 14 | Trofeo La Amistad | 0 | 0 | 0 | 0 | 0 | 0 | 0 | 0 | Retired |

Source: Arquero-Arba
Rules for classification: 1) Points; 2) Goal difference; 3) Number of goals scored

== Group 2 ==
| Pos | Team | Pld | W | D | L | GF | GA | GD | Pts | Qualification or relegation |
|---|---|---|---|---|---|---|---|---|---|---|
| 1 | Pozuelo de Alarcón | 26 | 25 | 0 | 1 | 180 | 20 | +160 | 75 | Qualification to the Final Four |
| 2 | Torrejón | 26 | 24 | 1 | 1 | 180 | 16 | +164 | 73 | Qualification to Copa de la Reina |
| 3 | Nuestra Señora de Belén | 26 | 19 | 3 | 4 | 67 | 27 | +40 | 60 | |
| 4 | Madrid Oeste | 26 | 17 | 2 | 7 | 87 | 48 | +39 | 53 | |
| 5 | Rosillo 75 | 26 | 16 | 4 | 6 | 63 | 54 | +9 | 52 | |
| 6 | León | 26 | 12 | 3 | 11 | 65 | 86 | −21 | 39 | |
| 7 | Peña Azul | 26 | 12 | 2 | 12 | 49 | 63 | −14 | 38 | |
| 8 | Casa Social Católica | 26 | 8 | 6 | 12 | 46 | 76 | −30 | 30 | |
| 9 | Tres Cantos | 26 | 6 | 8 | 12 | 45 | 74 | −29 | 26 | |
| 10 | Coslada | 26 | 6 | 6 | 14 | 42 | 76 | −34 | 24 | |
| 11 | Canillas | 26 | 6 | 3 | 17 | 36 | 103 | −67 | 21 | |
| 12 | Oroquieta Villaverde | 26 | 4 | 3 | 19 | 19 | 69 | −50 | 15 | |
| 13 | Miguelturreño | 26 | 3 | 5 | 18 | 33 | 99 | −66 | 14 | |
| 14 | EF Mareo | 26 | 0 | 2 | 24 | 21 | 122 | −101 | 2 | |

Source: Arquero-Arba
Rules for classification: 1) Points; 2) Goal difference; 3) Number of goals scored

== Group 3 ==
| Pos | Team | Pld | W | D | L | GF | GA | GD | Pts | Qualification or relegation |
|---|---|---|---|---|---|---|---|---|---|---|
| 1 | Levante | 26 | 26 | 0 | 0 | 240 | 5 | +235 | 78 | Qualification to the Final Four |
| 2 | Espanyol | 26 | 21 | 3 | 2 | 103 | 34 | +69 | 66 | Qualification to Copa de la Reina |
| 3 | L'Estartit | 26 | 17 | 5 | 4 | 95 | 57 | +38 | 56 | |
| 4 | CF Barcelona | 26 | 17 | 3 | 6 | 97 | 40 | +57 | 54 | |
| 5 | Sabadell | 26 | 13 | 4 | 9 | 69 | 49 | +20 | 43 | |
| 6 | Llers | 26 | 13 | 2 | 11 | 79 | 62 | +17 | 41 | |
| 7 | Tortosa | 26 | 11 | 5 | 10 | 68 | 76 | −8 | 38 | |
| 8 | Terrassa | 26 | 9 | 6 | 11 | 39 | 87 | −48 | 33 | |
| 9 | Sporting Plaza de Argel | 26 | 8 | 4 | 14 | 41 | 65 | −24 | 28 | |
| 10 | L'Eliana | 26 | 6 | 5 | 15 | 51 | 82 | −31 | 23 | |
| 11 | Breda | 26 | 5 | 5 | 16 | 35 | 85 | −50 | 20 | |
| 12 | Pardinyes | 26 | 4 | 6 | 16 | 45 | 88 | −43 | 18 | |
| 13 | Montjuïc | 26 | 4 | 4 | 18 | 29 | 123 | −94 | 16 | |
| 14 | Cornellà | 26 | 1 | 2 | 23 | 12 | 150 | −138 | 5 | |

Source: Arquero-Arba
Rules for classification: 1) Points; 2) Goal difference; 3) Number of goals scored

== Group 4 ==
| Pos | Team | Pld | W | D | L | GF | GA | GD | Pts | Qualification or relegation |
|---|---|---|---|---|---|---|---|---|---|---|
| 1 | Irex Puebla | 26 | 25 | 0 | 1 | 180 | 20 | +160 | 75 | Qualification to the Final Four |
| 2 | Híspalis | 26 | 24 | 1 | 1 | 178 | 14 | +164 | 73 | Qualification to Copa de la Reina |
| 3 | San Roque | 26 | 19 | 3 | 4 | 66 | 25 | +41 | 60 | |
| 4 | Estudiantes Huelva | 26 | 17 | 2 | 7 | 90 | 47 | +43 | 53 | |
| 5 | Atlético Jiennense | 26 | 16 | 4 | 6 | 62 | 54 | +8 | 52 | |
| 6 | Nueva Ciudad | 26 | 12 | 3 | 11 | 66 | 86 | −20 | 39 | |
| 7 | Fray Albino | 26 | 12 | 2 | 12 | 49 | 63 | −14 | 38 | |
| 8 | Peña Nuestra Señora de la Antigua | 26 | 8 | 6 | 12 | 46 | 76 | −30 | 30 | |
| 9 | Las Mercedes | 26 | 6 | 8 | 12 | 46 | 74 | −28 | 26 | |
| 10 | Ñaque | 26 | 6 | 6 | 14 | 41 | 80 | −39 | 24 | |
| 11 | Peña Rociera | 25 | 5 | 3 | 17 | 31 | 103 | −72 | 18 | |
| 12 | Ronda | 25 | 4 | 3 | 18 | 20 | 65 | −45 | 15 | |
| 13 | Juval | 0 | 0 | 0 | 0 | 0 | 0 | 0 | 0 | Retired |
| 14 | Montilla | 0 | 0 | 0 | 0 | 0 | 0 | 0 | 0 | Retired |

Source: Arquero-Arba
Rules for classification: 1) Points; 2) Goal difference; 3) Number of goals scored

== Final four ==
The Final Four was played on 19 and 21 May 2001.

Semifinals
Eibartarrak | 4
Irex Puebla | 2
Levante | 8
Pozuelo de Alarcón | 2

Final
Eibartarrak | 0
Levante | 4
