= 1999–2000 Liga Nacional de Fútbol Femenino =

The 1999–2000 Liga Nacional de Fútbol Femenino was the 12th season of the Spanish women's football first division. Irex Puebla won its first title.

== Competition format ==
Teams were divided into four groups of 14 teams each one. The four group winners would qualify to the Final Four for deciding the league champion.

== Group 1 ==
Pos	Team	Pld	W	D	L	GF	GA	GD	Pts	Qualification
1	Lagunak	22	18	3	1	72	20	+52	57	Qualification to the Final Four
2	Eibartarrak	22	18	2	2	88	22	+66	56	
3	Sondika	22	15	2	5	77	31	+46	47	
4	Oiartzun	22	10	5	7	58	38	+20	35	
5	Añorga	22	9	7	6	50	30	+20	34	
6	Bilbao	22	8	6	8	38	41	−3	30	
7	Anaitasuna	22	9	2	11	33	54	−21	29	
8	Bizkerre	22	8	4	10	47	52	−5	28	
9	Trofeo La Amistad	22	4	5	13	32	59	−27	17	
10	Dunboa	22	4	3	15	34	87	−53	15	
11	Lagun Onak	22	4	2	16	27	56	−29	14	
12	San Juan	22	3	3	16	32	98	−66	12	

Source: Arquero-Arba
Rules for classification: 1) Points; 2) Goal difference; 3) Number of goals scored

== Group 2 ==
Pos	Team	Pld	W	D	L	GF	GA	GD	Pts	Qualification
1	Torrejón	26	24	2	0	123	20	+103	74	Qualification to the Final Four
2	Madrid Oeste	26	22	1	3	126	22	+104	67	
3	Pozuelo de Alarcón	26	21	3	2	125	29	+96	66	
4	Nuestra Señora de Belén	26	18	3	5	87	37	+50	57	
5	Rosillo 75	26	13	4	9	64	39	+25	43	
6	León	26	11	3	12	68	100	−32	36	
7	Peña Azul	26	11	2	13	57	67	−10	35	
8	Oroquieta Villaverde	26	10	4	12	33	44	−11	34	
9	Tres Cantos	26	9	4	13	53	88	−35	31	
10	EF Mareo	26	7	6	13	54	93	−39	27	
11	Carbayedo	26	5	3	18	37	81	−44	18	
12	Nueva Elipa	26	3	6	17	41	124	−83	15	
13	Trobajo del Camino	26	3	2	21	33	83	−50	11	
14	Ribert	26	2	3	21	21	105	−84	9	

Source: Arquero-Arba
Rules for classification: 1) Points; 2) Goal difference; 3) Number of goals scored

== Group 3 ==
Pos	Team	Pld	W	D	L	GF	GA	GD	Pts	Qualification
1	Levante	24	23	1	0	176	6	+170	70	Qualification to the Final Four
2	Espanyol	24	19	3	2	110	17	+93	60	
3	L'Estartit	24	17	2	5	79	30	+49	53	
4	Llers	24	16	3	5	67	36	+31	51	
5	Sabadell	24	13	5	6	60	44	+16	44	
6	CF Barcelona	24	13	2	9	76	49	+27	41	
7	Pardinyes	24	7	6	11	47	68	−21	27	
8	Cornellà	24	7	5	12	37	65	−28	26	
9	Terrassa	24	6	5	13	36	50	−14	23	
10	Tortosa	24	3	8	13	38	112	−74	17	
11	La Canya	24	3	4	17	27	85	−58	13	
12	Gavanova	24	2	4	18	30	131	−101	10	
13	Blanes	24	1	4	19	25	115	−90	7	

Source: Arquero-Arba
Rules for classification: 1) Points; 2) Goal difference; 3) Number of goals scored

== Group 4 ==
Pos	Team	Pld	W	D	L	GF	GA	GD	Pts	Qualification
1	Irex Puebla	20	18	1	1	120	18	+102	55	Qualification to the Final Four
2	Híspalis	20	15	2	3	60	21	+39	47	
3	Estudiantes Huelva	20	14	3	3	71	25	+46	45	
4	Fray Albino	20	12	2	6	63	25	+38	38	
5	Nueva Ciudad	20	11	4	5	60	40	+20	37	
6	Atlético Jiennense	20	11	2	7	66	46	+20	35	
7	Peña Nuestra Señora de la Antigua	20	9	1	10	46	48	−2	28	
8	Ñaque	20	3	3	14	27	68	−41	12	
9	Ronda	20	2	3	15	38	102	−64	9	
10	Montilla	20	2	1	17	19	101	−82	7	
11	Virgen de la Chanca	20	0	4	16	17	93	−76	4	

Source: Arquero-Arba
Rules for classification: 1) Points; 2) Goal difference; 3) Number of goals scored

== Final four ==
The Final Four was played on 29 April and 1 May 2000.

Semifinals
Irex Puebla	4
Lagunak	3
Torrejón	1
Levante	0

Final
Irex Puebla (p)	0
Torrejón	0
