= 1994–95 Liga Nacional de Fútbol Femenino =

Liga Nacional
- Season: 1994–95
- Dates: 25 September 1994 – 19 February 1995
- Champions: Añorga (2nd title)
- Relegated: Anaitasuna (voluntarily); León; Parque Alcobendas
- Matches: 90

The 1994–95 División de Honor de Fútbol Femenino was the seventh edition of Spain's women's football premier league. Ten teams took part in the competition, which took place from 19 September 1993 to 27 March 1994, with Anaitasuna and León replacing relegated teams Olímpico Fortuna and Athenas.

Añorga won its second title with 16 wins in 18 matches and an eight points difference over defending champion Oroquieta Villaverde. Espanyol, Sondika and Sabadell followed in the table. León and FFP Alcobendas were relegated as the two bottom teams, and Anaitasuna FT, which ended in mid-table, also asked for relegation.

During the last minutes of Week 5's Sondika–Oroquieta Villaverde match, which ended in a 0–3 away win, a brawl degenerated into a beating which resulted in three injured Oroquieta players. RFEF, whose attitude following the incident was harshly criticized by Oroquieta executives and players, sanctioned one player from each team plus Oroquieta's manager and closed Sondika's ground for one match.

== Teams and locations ==
Team	Location
Anaitasuna	Azkoitia
Añorga	San Sebastián
CF Barcelona	Barcelona
Espanyol	Barcelona
León	León
Oroquieta Villaverde	Madrid
Oviedo Moderno	Oviedo
Parque Alcobendas	Alcobendas
Sabadell	Sabadell
Sondika	Sondika

== Final table ==
Pos	Team	Pld	W	D	L	GF	GA	GD	Pts	Relegation
1	Añorga	18	16	0	2	72	16	+56	48	
2	Oroquieta Villaverde	18	12	4	2	51	17	+34	40	
3	Espanyol	18	10	4	4	44	25	+19	34	
4	Sondika	18	9	2	7	61	37	+24	29	
5	Sabadell	18	8	2	8	32	40	−8	26	
6	Anaitasuna	18	6	3	9	37	32	+5	21	Relegated to Liga Nacional
7	CF Barcelona	18	4	8	6	27	38	−11	20	
8	Oviedo Moderno	18	4	3	11	26	51	−25	15	
9	León	18	3	3	12	30	57	−27	12	Relegated to Liga Nacional
10	Parque Alcobendas	18	1	5	12	31	98	−67	8	Relegated to Liga Nacional

Source: Arquero Arba
Rules for classification: 1) Points; 2) Head-to-head points; 3) Head-to-head goal difference; 4) Goal difference; 5) Goals scored.

== Results ==
Club	AÑO	ORV	ESP	SON	SAB	ANA	BAR	TRA	LEO	ALC
Añorga		2–1	?–?	2–1	4–0	2–0	6–1	?–?	6–1	4–1
Oroquieta	3–0		1–0	3–0	1–2	1–1	1–1	?–?	3–3	0–0
Espanyol	1–3	?–?		4–2	2–0	4–1	2–1	6–1	1–1	4–4
Sondika	3–1	0–3	2–3		8–1	1–1	?–?	4–2	5–2	15–2
Sabadell	1–5	?–?	1–1	4–0		?–?	1–1	1–2	3–2	5–2
Anaitasuna	?–?	2–3	1–2	2–2	0–2		0–1	4–2	4–1	11–2
Barcelona	?–?	0–3	1–1	3–1	1–3	1–3		1–1	3–2	?–?
Tradehi	0–3	0–4	0–3	2–3	0–3	2–0	1–1		?–?	2–1
León	1–6	?–?	?–?	?–?	1–4	3–1	1–2	1–1		3–2
Alcobendas	0–16	0–9	0–4	?–?	?–?	2–3	2–2	4–3	0–6	
