= CD Olímpico de León =

Spanish football club

Olímpico de León
- Full name: Club Deportivo Olímpico de León
- Ground: La Palomera, León
- League: Segunda División
- 2017–18: Segunda División – Gr. 5, 9th
Home colours

Club Deportivo Olímpico de León is a Spanish women's football club from León currently playing in Segunda División.

== History ==
Logo of León FF, used until 2018.

The club was founded as Puente Castro FC, before taking the name of León Fútbol Femenino in 1991. Puente Castro was one of the nine founding teams of the Liga Nacional de Fútbol Femenino in 1988.

The club enjoyed its best results in the following years, reaching the national cup's semifinals in 1990 and 1993 and playing in the División de Honor in 1989 — 1991 and 1995. In subsequent years the team played in the second tier, which served as the top category from 1997 to 2001 after the División de Honor was disbanded. León's best results in the second tier were 3rd positions in 2005 and 2010. It was briefly relegated to the third tier in 2006, 2008 ans 2013.

After spending four years in Regional, León FF promoted again to Segunda División in 2017. In May 2018, León FF was absorbed by CD Olímpico de León, becoming its women's football section.

== Season to season ==
=== As Puente Castro ===
Season	Div.	Pos.	Copa de la Reina
1988/89	1ª	8th	
1989/90	1ª	8th	
1990/91	1ª	9th	Quarterfinals

=== As León FF ===
Season	Div.	Pos.	Copa de la Reina
1991/92	2ª	2nd	Quarterfinals
1992/93	2ª	3rd	Semifinals
1993/94	2ª		Quarterfinals
1994/95	1ª	9th	Quarterfinals
1995/96	2ª		
1996/97	1ª	4th	
1997/98	1ª	8th	
1998/99	1ª	9th	
1999/00	1ª	6th	
2000/01	1ª	6th	
2001/02	2ª	5th	
2002/03	2ª	4th	
2003/04	2ª	5th	
2004/05	2ª	3rd	

Season	Div.	Pos.	Copa de la Reina
2005/06	2ª	12th	
2006/07	Reg.	1st	
2007/08	2ª	12th	
2008/09	Reg.	3rd	
2009/10	2ª	3rd	
2010/11	2ª	10th	
2011/12	2ª	7th	
2012/13	2ª	11th	
2013/14	Reg.	2nd	
2014/15	Reg.	3rd	
2015/16	Reg.	2nd	
2016/17	Reg.	1st	
2017/18	2ª	9th	

=== As Olímpico de León ===
Season	Div.	Pos.	Copa de la Reina
2018/19	2ª	13th (Note: Due to the creation of the new Primera División B, the team remained in the same league but it became the third level.)	
2019/20	2ª		

== Former internationals ==
- (Spain) Celsa García
- (Spain) Mercedes González
