= 1989–90 Liga Nacional de Fútbol Femenino =

Liga Nacional
- Season: 1990–91
- Dates: 24 September 1989 – 3 June 1990
- Champions: Atlético Villa de Madrid (1st title)

The 1989–90 Liga Nacional de Fútbol Femenino was the second season of the Spanish women's football top tier. Atlético Villa de Madrid won their first title ever.

The season did not use a regular relegation system. With the expansion of the league, all teams entering for the 1990–91 season were placed into a group stage. The eight best teams from this preliminary round, regardless of placement in the 1989–90 season (or non-placement in the case of new entrants), went on to play in the 1990–91 División de Honor, recognised as the top tier. The rest of the teams contested a league split into groups and still called the Liga Nacional Primera División, considered the second tier.

== League table ==
Pos	Team	Pld	W	D	L	GF	GA	GD	Pts	Relegation	ATM	PBB	ESP	SAB	FCB	PUB	OFO	ORO	LEO	CHI	ALC	COM
1	Atlético Villa de Madrid (C)	22	20	1	1	121	33	+88	41		—	3–1	3–4	5–1	2–1	4–2	5–3	3–1	13–2	7–1	11–0	11–1
2	Peña Barcilona	20	18	1	1	70	13	+57	37		1–1	—	4–2	3–0	1–0	6–0	?–?	1–0	9–2	4–0	?–?	5–0
3	Español	21	14	2	5	72	33	+39	30	Relegation to second tier	1–7	0–3	—	0–2	3–1	?–?	4–2	5–0	4–1	5–0	6–0	4–0
4	Sabadell	22	9	5	8	54	52	+2	23	Relegation to second tier	1–4	1–2	3–3	—	3–2	4–1	3–5	3–4	1–1	6–1	2–0	3–0
5	CF Barcelona	21	9	3	9	49	39	+10	21		2–3	2–3	2–5	1–1	—	3–1	2–4	3–1	8–2	0–3	3–0	4–1
6	PubliSport	21	8	4	9	41	53	−12	20	Relegation to second tier	2–4	0–2	2–2	6–1	1–1	—	2–1	2–1	1–5	4–0	1–1	0–4
7	Olímpico Fortuna	19	7	3	9	43	44	−1	17	Relegation to second tier	1–3	0–3	0–5	1–1	1–3	1–3	—	4–2	6–1	5–2	1–1	5–2
8	Oroquieta Villaverde	20	6	4	10	36	45	−9	16		3–4	1–4	1–0	4–5	1–1	1–1	?–?	—	1–3	4–3	1–1	5–0
9	Puente Castro	21	8	1	12	50	90	−40	17		2–13	0–2	1–8	3–5	1–2	2–4	1–0	?–?	—	4–2	4–2	4–2
10	La Chimenea	21	6	1	14	44	70	−26	13	Relegation to second tier	1–6	1–5	0–3	3–0 (Note: CE Sabadell did not appear to playing the match)	2–4	8–0	?–?	1–2	2–4	—	5–1	3–2
11	Parque Alcobendas	21	3	4	14	17	70	−53	10	Relegation to second tier	0–5	0–5	0–3	1–6	0–4	0–3	1–1	0–2	4–2	2–4	—	1–0
12	Complutense	21	1	3	17	24	79	−55	5	Relegation to second tier	2–4	0–6	1–5	2–2	?–?	2–5	0–2	1–1	1–5	2–2	1–2	—

Source: Arquero Arba
Rules for classification: 1) Points; 2) Head-to-head points; 3) Head-to-head goal difference; 4) Goal difference; 5) Goals scored.
(C) Champions
