= Sporting de Gijón (women) =

Spanish football team

- Full name: Real Sporting de Gijón Femenino
- Nickname(s): Rojiblancas (Red-and-Whites)
- Founded: 1995
- Ground: Escuela de Fútbol de Mareo, Gijón, Asturias, Spain
- Capacity: 3,000
- President: Javier Fernández
- Manager: Rafael Bernal
- League: Segunda Federación
- 2022–23: 1st (Group 1)
- Website: http://www.realsporting.com/
Home colours	Away colours

Real Sporting de Gijón Femenino is the women's football team of Asturian football club Sporting de Gijón.

== History ==
Founded in 1995, the club was renamed as Club Deportivo Escuela de Fútbol de Mareo Femenino in 1999 as part of an agreement with Gijón's town hall, the club decided to rename the team again as Real Sporting de Gijón Femenino in 2016, and to declare it as the official women's section of the club.

The club played from 1996 to 2001 in Primera División, when it was composed by multiple groups.

In 2018, the club signed for the first time players from out from Asturias. Despite not gaining a spot for the smaller Segunda División next season, after spending 18 consecutive seasons in Segunda División, on 31 July 2019, the Royal Spanish Football Federation gave to the club the vacant place of Atlántida Matamá in the newly created Segunda División.

== Season by season ==
Season	League									
Season	Tier	Div.	Pos.	P	W	D	L	F	A	Pts
1995–96	2	Reg.	1st	16	15	0	1	150	13	45
1996–97	1	1ª	9th	19	5	4	10	31	48	19
1997–98	1	1ª	5th	22	10	5	7	49	44	35
1998–99	1	1ª	8th	26	5	4	11	31	54	19
1999–00	1	1ª	10th	26	7	6	13	54	93	27
2000–01	1	1ª	14th	26	0	2	24	21	123	2
2001–02	2	2ª	3rd	18	11	2	5	65	34	35
2002–03	2	2ª	3rd	22	14	0	8	75	35	42
2003–04	2	2ª	8th	26	5	5	12	33	58	20
2004–05	2	2ª	8th	26	9	3	14	47	65	30
2005–06	2	2ª	8th	28	9	10	9	65	61	47
2006–07	2	2ª	7th	26	7	9	10	36	52	34
2007–08	2	2ª	7th	26	10	6	10	41	36	36
2008–09	2	2ª	11th	25	5	9	11	36	48	24
2009–10	2	2ª	8th	26	9	4	13	53	56	31
2010–11	2	2ª	3rd	26	16	2	8	72	41	50
2011–12	2	2ª	4th	26	14	5	7	50	25	47
2012–13	2	2ª	5th	26	12	4	10	35	38	40
2013–14	2	2ª	6th	26	11	5	10	45	42	38
2014–15	2	2ª	2nd	26	14	5	7	52	37	47
2015–16	2	2ª	5th	24	13	1	10	56	49	40
2016–17	2	2ª	3rd	26	17	2	7	75	36	53
2017–18	2	2ª	9th	26	10	2	14	55	53	32
2018–19	2	2ª	6th (Note: Achieved a vacant place in the new Segunda División Pro.)	26	13	4	9	67	47	43
2019–20	2	2ªP	16th	22	2	2	18	12	64	8
2021–22	2	2ªP	15th	30	6	5	19	33	53	23
2022–23	4	1ª N	1st	30	25	3	2	96	13	78
2023–24	3	2ªF	11th	30	9	6	15	37	51	33

== Current squad ==
As of 23 December 2019

Note: Flags indicate national team as defined under FIFA eligibility rules; some limited exceptions apply. Players may hold more than one non-FIFA nationality.

No.	Pos.	Nation	Player
2	DF	(Spain) ESP	Paz Sánchez
3	DF	(Spain) ESP	Marta Nieto
4	DF	(Spain) ESP	Pipa
6	MF	(Spain) ESP	Noelia Fernández
8	FW	(Spain) ESP	Sheila Fernández
9	FW	(Spain) ESP	Natalia Sobero
11	FW	(Spain) ESP	Pañu
13	GK	(Spain) ESP	Sheila Casasola
14	DF	(Spain) ESP	Alba Álvarez
15	MF	(Ecuador) ECU	Mayra Olvera

No.	Pos.	Nation	Player
17	MF	(Spain) ESP	Marta Rodríguez
18	DF	(Spain) ESP	Lucía Ayuso
19	FW	(Spain) ESP	Nuria Cueto
23	FW	(Spain) ESP	Érika González
24	DF	(Spain) ESP	Yaiza
25	GK	(Spain) ESP	Paula Madrazo
26	FW	(Spain) ESP	Alba Fernández
—	GK	(Spain) ESP	Oihana Aldai
—	FW	(Brazil) BRA	Millene Cabral
