= 1993–94 Liga Nacional de Fútbol Femenino =

Liga Nacional
- Season: 1993–94
- Dates: 19 September 1993 – 27 March 1994
- Champions: Oroquieta Villaverde (2nd title)
- Relegated: Olímpico Fortuna; Athenas
- Matches: 90
- Goals: 350 (3.89 per match)

The 1993–94 División de Honor de Fútbol Femenino was the 5th season of the Spanish women's football first division. Oroquieta Villaverde won its second title.

This was the first season where three points were given by each win.

== Teams and locations ==
Team	Location
Athenas	Barcelona
Añorga	San Sebastián
CF Barcelona	Barcelona
Español	Barcelona
Olímpico Fortuna	Madrid
Oroquieta Villaverde	Madrid
Parque Alcobendas	Alcobendas
Sabadell	Sabadell
Sondika	Sondika
Tradehi Oviedo	Oviedo

== League table ==
Pos	Team	Pld	W	D	L	GF	GA	GD	Pts	Relegation
1	Oroquieta Villaverde	18	16	1	1	70	11	+59	49	
2	Añorga	18	14	0	4	69	17	+52	42	
3	CF Barcelona	18	13	2	3	46	18	+28	41	
4	Sabadell	18	8	3	7	46	34	+12	27	
5	Español	17	7	3	7	28	26	+2	24	
6	Sondika	18	5	3	10	48	42	+6	18	
7	Parque Alcobendas	18	5	3	10	32	60	−28	18	
8	Tradehi Oviedo	17	5	1	11	17	46	−29	16	
9	Olímpico Fortuna	18	4	3	11	24	50	−26	15	Relegated to Liga Nacional
10	Athenas	18	1	3	14	9	85	−76	6	Relegated to Liga Nacional

Source: Arquero Arba
Rules for classification: 1) Points; 2) Head-to-head points; 3) Head-to-head goal difference; 4) Goal difference; 5) Goals scored.
