= SD Eibar (women) =

Spanish women's football team

Eibar
- Full name: Sociedad Deportiva Eibar Femenino
- Nickname: Armagiñak
- Founded: 1991 (as Eibartarrak FT); 2009 (as SD Eibar)
- Stadium: Estadio Municipal de Ipurúa
- Capacity: 8,164
- President: Amaia Gorostiza
- Head coach: Ana Junyent
- League: Liga F
- 2025–26: 13th
- Website: sdeibar.com/femenino
Home colours	Away colours

Sociedad Deportiva Eibar Femenino is a Spanish women's football team from Eibar, Gipuzkoa, Basque Country, currently playing in Liga F. It is the women's section of SD Eibar.

Below the first team, the club also incorporates a senior B-team playing at the provincial fourth level, plus three youth teams.

== History ==
Eibar women's team was founded in 1991 as Eibartarrak Futbol Taldea. Eibartarrak reached the Copa de la Reina final and won the Supercopa in 1999, and was the League's runner-up two years later. However, it wasn't included in the unified 2001–2002 Superliga Femenina, instead playing in Primera Nacional. In 2003 it adopted SD Eibar's name (as Eibar-Eibartarrak) and kit, while remaining an independent club.

In 2009 it finally became a section of SD Eibar, and was promoted to the Superliga following a reform of the competition. Eibar was relegated two years later.

In 2017–18, Eibar posted their best result for a decade with a 3rd-place finish in the second tier, in a season which was seen as successful for all teams attached to the club.

In 2019–20, Eibar was granted promotion to the Primera División as the team ranked second behind Athletic Club Femenino's reserve team (not eligible for promotion) when the league was ended prematurely due to the COVID-19 pandemic. They were relegated after two seasons in the top tier, but bounced back immediately in 2022–23, with a similar scenario to three years earlier: this time Barcelona B won the division, with Eibar promoted as runners-up.

== Players ==
=== Current squad ===
As of 12 August 2026.

Note: Flags indicate national team as defined under FIFA eligibility rules; some limited exceptions apply. Players may hold more than one non-FIFA nationality.

No.	Pos.	Nation	Player
1	GK	GER	Anna Wellmann
3	DF	ESP	Aitana Zumárraga
4	DF	ESP	Carla Andrés
5	DF	ESP	Nahia Azpiazu
7	FW	BEL	Thrisa de Meester
8	MF	CHI	Nerea Sánchez
9	FW	ESP	Ángeles del Álamo
10	MF	ESP	Elena Valej
12	DF	BFA	Alimata Bélem

No.	Pos.	Nation	Player
13	GK	ESP	Laura Martí
14	DF	COL	Simona Botero
16	FW	ESP	Carmen Álvarez
18	MF	ESP	Adela Rico
19	FW	ESP	Sara Martín
20	DF	ESP	Mireia Masegur
22	MF	ESP	Noe Fernández
23	DF	AZE	Samara Ortiz
—	DF	USA	Marianna Seidl
—	MF	ESP	Maria Carvajal (on loan from Juventus)

== Season by season ==
=== As Eibartarrak ===
Season	Division	Place	Copa de la Reina
1997/98	1ª	2nd	First round
1998/99	1ª	1st/SF	Runners-up
1999/00	1ª	2nd	Preliminary
2000/01	1ª	1st/RU	Quarterfinals
2001/02	2ª	2nd	
2002/03	2ª	4th	
2003/04	2ª	6th	
2004/05	2ª	6th	
2004/05	2ª	6th	
2005/06	2ª	7th	
2007/08	2ª	6th	
2008/09	2ª	6th	

=== As SD Eibar ===
Season	Division	Place	Copa de la Reina
2009–10	1ª	21st	
2010–11	1ª	23rd	
2011–12	2ª	10th	
2012–13	2ª	13th	
2013–14	Regional	2nd	
2014/15	Regional	1st	
2015–16	2ª	10th (Note: Placing in one of 7 regionalised groups.)	
2016–17	2ª	6th (Note: Placing in one of 6 regionalised groups.)	
2017–18	2ª	3rd	
2018–19	2ª	3rd (Note: The team qualified to move up to the new Primera División B but remained in the second tier of the system due to its creation.)	
2019–20	2ªP	2nd (Note: Placing in one of 2 regionalised groups.) (Note: Season curtailed due to the COVID-19 pandemic in Spain.)	
2020–21	1ª	14th	
2021–22	1ª	15th	Third round
2022–23	1ª Fed	2nd	Third round
2023–24	1ª	10th	Third round
2024–25	1ª	8th	Third round
2025–26	1ª	13th	Round of 16

== Honours ==
As Eibartarrak

- Liga Nacional (first tier): runners-up 2000–01
- Copa de la Reina: runners-up 1999
- Supercopa de España: 1999
- Copa Vasca: 1996, 2002

As Eibar

- Basque Regional League (third tier): 2014–15
- Copa Vasca: 2006
