= Liga F =

Highest division of league competition for Spanish women's football

- Founded: 1988; 38 years ago
- Country: Spain
- Confederation: UEFA
- Number of clubs: 16
- Level on pyramid: 1
- Relegation to: Primera Federación
- Domestic cup(s): Copa de la Reina; Supercopa de España Femenina
- International cup: UEFA Women’s Champions League
- Current champions: Barcelona (11th title) (2025–26)
- Most championships: Barcelona (11 titles)
- Broadcasters: GOL PLAY (Spain only); DAZN (worldwide, inc. Spain)
- Sponsor: Moeve
- Website: ligaf.es
- Current: 2026–27 Liga F

The Primera División de la Liga de Fútbol Femenino, currently known as the Liga F (Note: Spanish: [ˌli.ɣ̞a ˈe.fe]; Catalan: Lliga F) (Liga F Moeve for sponsorship reasons), is the highest level of league competition for women's football in Spain. It is the women's equivalent of the men's La Liga, and it is organized by the Liga Profesional de Fútbol Femenino (LPFF). As one league of the top six national leagues ranked by Union of European Football Associations (UEFA) coefficient, it is considered one of the most important women's leagues in Europe. Starting with the 2021–22 edition, as determined by the UEFA women's coefficient, the top three teams qualify for the UEFA Women's Champions League.

The league was founded in 1988 and has undergone several changes in format since then. It has been named Primera Iberdrola, Superliga Femenina, División de Honor, and Liga Nacional. A total of 12 different clubs have been champions, with Barcelona winning the most championships, eleven.

== History ==
=== Liga Nacional ===
The league was founded in 1988 as Liga Nacional, formed by Olímpico Fortuna, Puente Castro, Parque Alcobendas, Santa María Atlético, Vallès Occidental, RCD Espanyol, FC Barcelona, CE Sabadell and Peña Barcelonista Barcilona.

=== División de Honor ===
Starting in the 1996–97 season the league was divided into 4 groups. The group winners played a semi-final and final to decide the champion.

=== Superliga ===
Old logo of the league.

By 2000, women's teams were displeased that their competitions and calendars were being created by men's teams so, in June 2000, Levante submitted a proposal to the Spanish Federation for a new league, the Superliga. Levante's proposed Superliga was to be organised by women's teams, under the Spanish Federation, and had the support of a majority of women's teams in the country. At the time it was proposed, with the intention to replace the league for the next (2001–02) season, the clubs also threatened to boycott Federation competitions if it was not accepted.

For the 2001–02 season the league was renamed the Superliga and the competition system was changed from the group format to a double round-robin, with each team playing the other teams twice, once away and once at home. The league in this period consisted of 14 teams. The 2008–09 season kept the double round-robin format as the league increased from 14 to 16 teams.

In the 2009–10 season the Superliga increased from 16 to 24 teams, causing criticism by teams and players who feared a decline in the quality of competition. The Superliga was divided into 3 groups of 7 to 8 teams each, with geographically nearby teams placed into each group to minimize travel. In the first stage of the season, each team played each other team in its group twice. In the second stage, the best two of each group as well as the two best third-place finishers went into group A and the other teams were divided into groups B and C based on a predefined key. Again a double round-robin was played within each group. All Group A teams and the three best finishers of Group B and C qualified for the Copa de la Reina, and the two best teams in Group A played each other in a two-legged final for the season's championship. Rayo Vallecano won the 2009–10 and 2010-11 finals, both times against RCD Espanyol. In the 2009–10 season, two teams had to withdraw from the league for financial reasons.

=== Primera División ===
Starting in the 2011–12 season, the league was renamed to Primera División and the group-based system was eliminated; 18 teams played double round-robin to decide the champion. The size was reduced to 16 teams for the 2012–13 season. Before the 2016–17 season, the RFEF agreed to a sponsorship by Iberdrola, renaming the league Liga Iberdrola. This was slightly changed to Primera Iberdrola in 2019.

On 22 October 2019, following a breakdown of negotiations with the RFEF for a year over salaries and working conditions, the players went on a strike and a number of league games had to be cancelled due to the strike. On 18 November, the players announced that they would be lifting the strike, after reaching an agreement with the ACFF to resume negotiations for a new collective bargaining agreement.

In 2020 the Primera División was halted due to the COVID-19 pandemic.

On 10 June 2020 the Primera División was granted professionalised league status.

Starting with the 2021-2022 season, the league became fully professional, and reduced from 18 teams to 16.

The opening fixture of the 2023−24 season, set for 8 September 2023, was cancelled in the wake of strike called by five players unions.

== Teams ==
Location of the 2022–23 Liga F teams
Location of Community of Madrid teams in 2022–23 Liga F
Canary Islands location of the 2022–23 Liga F teams

=== Stadiums and locations ===
Team	Home city	Stadium	Capacity
Athletic Club	Bilbao	Lezama 2	3,200
Atlético Madrid	Madrid	Centro Deportivo Wanda	2,700
Barcelona	Barcelona	Johan Cruyff Stadium	6,000
Eibar	Eibar	Unbe	1,000
Granada	Granada	Ciudad Deportiva del Granada CF	600
Levante	Valencia	Ciudad Deportiva de Buñol	3,000
Levante Badalona	Badalona	Estadi Municipal de Badalona	4,170
Madrid CFF	San Sebastián de los Reyes	Estadio Fernando Torres	6,000
Real Betis	Seville	Estadio Luis del Sol	1,300
Real Madrid	Madrid	Alfredo Di Stéfano Stadium	6,000
Real Sociedad	San Sebastián	Campo José Luis Orbegozo	2,500
Sevilla Fútbol Club Femenino	Seville	Estadio Jesús Navas	8,000
Sporting de Huelva	Huelva	Campo del C.D. Lamiya	1,500
UDG Tenerife	Granadilla de Abona	Estadio Francisco Suárez	2,700
Valencia CF Femenino	Valencia	Ciudad Deportiva de Paterna	3,000
Villarreal	Villarreal	Ciudad Deportiva Pamesa Cerámica	3,500

== List of champions ==
The following list shows all champions of the Spanish women's football league. Before creation of the league, from 1983 to 1988 the Copa de la Reina de Fútbol winners were the Spanish champions.

Season	Teams	Champion	Points	Runner-up	Points	Third place	Points
Liga Nacional
1988–89	9	Peña Barcilona (1)	24	Parque Alcobendas	21	Espanyol	20
1989–90	12	Atlético Villa de Madrid (1)	43	Peña Barcilona	39	Espanyol	30
1990–91	8	Oiartzun (1)	20	Atlético Villa de Madrid	20	Añorga	20
1991–92	8	Añorga (1)	27	FC Barcelona	19	Oiartzun	17
1992–93	7	Oroquieta Villaverde (1)	24	Añorga	21	FC Barcelona	20
1993–94	10	Oroquieta Villaverde (2)	49	Añorga	42	FC Barcelona	40
1994–95	10	Añorga (2)	48	Oroquieta Villaverde	40	Espanyol	34
1995–96	9	Añorga (3)	36	Oroquieta Villaverde	31	Espanyol	30
División de Honor
1996–97		San Vicente (1)	(Note: Played with teams divided into groups, the title was decided in a final group played by the four group winners in a double legged round-robin tournament.)	Añorga	-	AD Guillén Lafuerza	-
1997–98	45	Atlético Málaga (1)	(Note: Played with teams divided into groups, the title was decided in a single-game final where Atlético Málaga beat Sant Vicènt by 2–0.)	Sant Vicent	-		-
1998–99	50	Oroquieta Villaverde (3)	(Note: Played with teams divided into groups, the title was decided in a single-game final where Oroquieta Villaverde beat Irex Puebla.)	Puebla	-		-
1999–2000	50	Puebla (1)	(Note: Played with teams divided into groups, the title was decided in a single-game final where Irex Puebla beat Torrejón in the penalty shootout after a draw by 0–0.)	Torrejón	-		-
2000–01	56	Levante (2)	(Note: Played with teams divided into groups, the title was decided in a single-game final where Levante beat Eibartarrak by 4–0.)	Eibartarrak	-		-
Superliga
2001–02	11	Levante (3)	57	Puebla	51	Espanyol	37
2002–03	12	Athletic Club (1)	55	Levante	55	Puebla	46
2003–04	14	Athletic Club (2)	60	Sabadell	58	Levante	58
2004–05	14	Athletic Club (3)	66 (Note: Unbeaten season (26 matches).)	Levante	63	Espanyol	57
2005–06	13	Espanyol (1)	60	Híspalis (Note: Sevilla FC participated as sponsor of CD Híspalis, before creating its own team in 2008.)	60	Levante	55
2006–07	14	Athletic Club (4)	64	Espanyol	63	Levante	55
2007–08	14	Levante (4)	71	Rayo Vallecano	71	Athletic Club	53
2008–09	16	Rayo Vallecano (1)	81	Levante	76	Athletic Club	65
2009–10	22	Rayo Vallecano (2)	(Note: Played with teams divided into groups, the title was decided in a double-legged final where Rayo Vallecano won 1–0 and 1–1.)	Espanyol	-	Athletic Club	-
2010–11	23	Rayo Vallecano (3)	(Note: Played with teams divided into groups, the title was decided in a double-legged final where Rayo Vallecano won 2–2 and 1–2.)	Espanyol	-	Athletic Club	-
Primera División
2011–12	18	Barcelona (1)	94	Athletic Club	91	Espanyol	76
2012–13	16	Barcelona (2)	76	Athletic Club	74	Atlético de Madrid	68
2013–14	16	Barcelona (3)	79	Athletic Club	69	Atlético de Madrid	54
2014–15	16	Barcelona (4)	77	Atlético de Madrid	69	Athletic Club	65
2015–16	16	Athletic Club (5)	78	Barcelona	77	Atlético de Madrid	69
2016–17	16	Atlético de Madrid (2)	78 (Note: Unbeaten season (30 matches).)	Barcelona	75	Valencia	68
2017–18	16	Atlético de Madrid (3)	77	Barcelona	76	Athletic Club	56
2018–19	16	Atlético de Madrid (4)	84	Barcelona	78	Levante	57
2019–20 (Note: Due to the COVID-19 pandemic, the season ended prematurely.)	16	Barcelona (5)	59 (Note: Unbeaten season (21 matches).)	Atlético de Madrid	50	Levante	45
2020–21	18	Barcelona (6)	99	Real Madrid	74	Levante	70
2021–22	16	Barcelona (7)	90 (Note: Unbeaten and perfect season - all wins (30 matches).)	Real Sociedad	66	Real Madrid	60
Liga F
2022–23	16	Barcelona (8)	85	Real Madrid	75	Levante	66
2023–24	16	Barcelona (9)	88 (Note: Unbeaten season (30 matches).)	Real Madrid	73	Atlético de Madrid	61
2024–25	16	Barcelona (10)	84	Real Madrid	76	Atlético de Madrid	58
2025–26	16	Barcelona (11)	87	Real Madrid	72	Real Sociedad	66

== Performance by club ==
=== Since the inception of the Superliga ===
Teams	Winners	Runners-up	Winning years
Barcelona	11	4	2012, 2013, 2014, 2015, 2020, 2021, 2022, 2023, 2024, 2025, 2026
Athletic Club	5	3	2003, 2004, 2005, 2007, 2016
Atlético Madrid	3	2	2017, 2018, 2019
Rayo Vallecano	3	1	2009, 2010, 2011
Levante	2	3	2002, 2008
Espanyol	1	3	2006
Real Madrid	0	4	
Puebla	0	1	
Sabadell	0	1	
Híspalis	0	1	
Real Sociedad	0	1	

=== Overall ===
Teams in bold currently compete in Liga F as of the 2024–25 season. Seasons marked in italic are those when the team won a double with the Copa de la Reina.

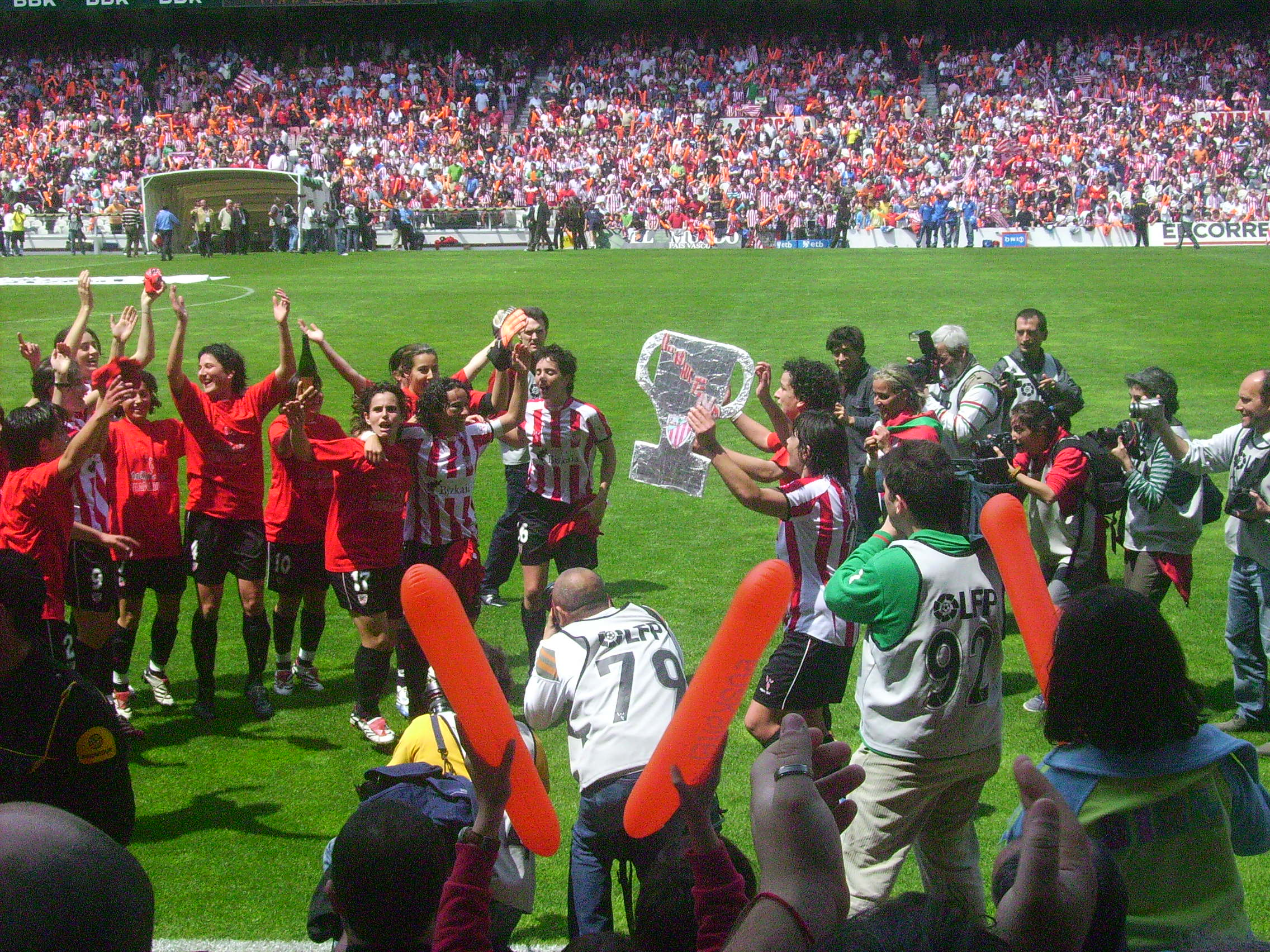
Athletic Club celebrating its fourth title, won in 2007

Teams	Winners	Runners-up	Winning years
**Barcelona**	11	5	2012, 2013, 2014, 2015, 2020, 2021, 2022, 2023, 2024, 2025, 2026
**Athletic Club**	5	3	2003, 2004, 2005, 2007, 2016
**Levante**	4	4	1997, (Note: Title won as Sant Vicent València CFF.) 2001, 2002, 2008
**Atlético de Madrid**	4	3	1990, (Note: Title won as Atlético Villa de Madrid.) 2017, 2018, 2019
Añorga	3	3	1992, 1995, 1996
Oroquieta Villaverde	3	2	1993, 1994, 1999
Rayo Vallecano	3	1	2009, 2010, 2011
**Espanyol**	1	3	2006
Puebla (Note: Currently Extremadura UD.)	1	2	2000
Peña Barcilona	1	1	1989
Oiartzun	1	0	1991
Atlético Málaga (Note: Currently Málaga CF.)	1	0	1998
**Real Madrid**	0	5	
Parque Alcobendas	0	1	
Torrejón	0	1	
**Eibartarrak** (Note: Currently SD Eibar.)	0	1	
Sabadell	0	1	
Híspalis	0	1	
**Real Sociedad**	0	1	

== All-time Liga F table ==
=== Liga Nacional (1988–1996) ===
Rank	Club	S	P	W	D	L	GF	GA	GD	Pts	Win % (Note: A draw counts as a ½ win)
1	Añorga KKE	6	92	73	4	15	348	102	+246	150	81.52%
2	CD Oroquieta Villaverde	7	112	66	16	30	304	182	+122	148	66.07%
3	FC Barcelona	8	129	58	26	45	261	226	+35	142	55.04%
4	RCD Español	5	88	47	18	23	223	139	+84	112	63.64%
5	CE Sabadell	7	114	47	18	51	249	249	0	112	49.12%
6	Atletico Villa de Madrid	3	50	32	8	10	190	100	+90	72	72%
7	Peña Barcelonista Barcilona	3	50	33	6	11	134	64	+70	72	72%
8	CD Sondika	3	52	23	8	21	152	107	+45	54	51.92%
9	FFP Parque Alcobendas	5	87	19	16	52	136	316	-180	54	31.03%
10	Olímpico Fortuna	3	53	19	8	26	102	123	-21	46	43.4%
11	Oiartzun KE	2	28	17	3	8	83	41	+42	37	66.07%
12	Puente Castro FC	4	69	14	8	47	122	267	-145	36	26.09%
13	CFF Tradehi	5	59	9	7	73	70	200	-130	25	21.19%
14	CF PubliSport	1	21	8	4	9	41	53	-12	20	47.62%
15	CFF Vallès Occidental	1	16	8	2	6	35	24	+14	18	56.25%
16	CF Llers	2	28	7	4	17	42	82	+40	18	32.14%
17	CD Anaitasuna	1	18	6	3	9	37	32	+5	15	41.67%
18	EFAV La Chimenea	1	21	6	1	14	44	70	-26	13	30.95%
19	Atlético Málaga	1	16	4	4	8	22	27	-5	12	37.5%
20	CFF Athenas	2	30	1	9	20	20	113	-93	10	18.33%
21	Universidad Complutense	1	21	1	3	17	24	79	-55	5	11.9%
22	Atlético Santa María del Camí	1	16	1	2	13	13	54	-35	4	12.5%

=== División de Honor (1996–2001) ===
Almost 100 clubs participated during the 5 seasons that this league format lasted.

==== Group stages ====
Group 1 (North)	Group 2 (East)	Group 3 (Centre)	Group 4 (South) (Note: results of the 1996-97 season are not quantified)

Rank	Club	S	P	W	D	L	GF	GA	GD	Pts	Win %
1	Sant Vicent CCF / Levante UD	5	127	112	8	7	743	69	+674	232	91.34%
2	RCD Espanyol	5	127	99	18	10	563	99	+464	216	85.04%
3	CF Barcelona	5	127	97	12	27	511	184	+327	206	81.1%
4	Eibartarrak	5	124	91	20	13	477	133	+344	202	81.45%
5	SD Lagunak	5	124	86	23	15	420	145	+275	195	78.63%
6	CF Llers	5	127	80	13	34	426	236	+190	173	68.11%
7	Oiartzun KE	5	124	69	23	32	426	236	+192	161	64.92%
8	CD Sondika	4	100	73	14	13	325	126	+199	160	80%
9	Añorga KKE	5	124	61	31	32	327	167	+160	153	61.69%
10	EF Madrid Oeste Boadilla	4	94	72	8	14	397	109	+288	152	80.85%
11	CD Oroquieta Villaverde	5	114	69	11	34	343	166	+227	149	65.35%
12	UE Cornellà	5	127	64	20	55	270	299	-29	148	58.27%
13	Rayo Burgalés / CD Nuestra Señora de Belén	5	114	62	21	31	280	171	+109	145	63.6%
14	UE L'Estartit	4	101	66	12	23	330	168	+162	144	71.29%
15	CE Sabadell	4	101	65	13	23	341	154	+187	143	70.79%
16	León FF	5	114	55	19	50	285	246	-61	129	47.81%
17	CFF Bilbao	5	124	45	26	53	250	265	-15	116	46.77%
18	CFF Puebla	3	61	55	4	2	358	48	+310	114	93.44%
19	CD Lagun Onak	5	124	44	25	55	231	262	-31	113	45.56%
20	CD Anaitasuna	5	124	44	23	57	226	281	-55	111	44.76%
21	CD Tortosa	5	127	40	22	65	254	453	-199	102	40.16%
22	AD Torrejón CF	2	52	48	3	1	303	36	+267	99	95.19%
23	Peña Azul Oviedo	5	114	40	16	58	194	286	-92	96	42.11%
24	CF Pozuelo de Alarcón	2	52	46	3	3	305	49	+256	95	41.67%
25	AFF Butarque	3	62	42	11	9	204	67	+137	95	41.67%
26	Trofeo La Amistad	5	100	39	16	48	177	228	-51	94	47%
27	CD Híspalis	3	61	41	9	11	213	97	+116	91	74.59%
28	CD Olímpico Rosillo 75	3	62	40	11	21	191	132	+59	91	39.91%
29	Bizkerre FT	4	100	34	22	44	205	216	-11	90	45%
30	CF Pardinyes	5	127	31	27	68	205	393	-188	89	35.04%
31	CFF Estudiantes de Huelva	3	61	40	8	13	187	100	+87	88	72.13%
32	CD Municipal de Corella	3	74	32	13	29	121	125	-4	77	52.03%
33	Sporting de Gijón / EF Mareo	5	114	28	21	36	151	361	-172	77	33.77%
34	Terrassa FC	4	101	29	17	55	158	299	-141	75	37.13%
35	FCF Atlético Jiennense	4	61	28	9	24	195	152	+43	55	71.31%
36	AD Guillén Lafuerza	2	42	26	4	12	134	90	+44	56	66.67%
37	UD Tres Cantos	3	72	20	16	36	134	225	-91	56	38.89%
38	Mondragón CF	3	78	21	12	45	117	221	-104	54	34.62%
39	Atlético Málaga	2	28	23	3	2	110	14	+96	49	87.5%
40	CD Fray Albino	2	43	22	5	16	127	72	+55	49	56.98%
41	CD Nueva Ciudad	2	43	20	8	15	129	102	+27	48	55.81%
42	AD Peña Nuestra Señora de la Antigua	2	43	21	3	19	108	98	+10	45	52.33%
43	Club Internacional de la Amistad	3	62	14	11	37	62	178	-116	39	31.45%
44	CD San Roque	1	23	17	2	4	111	46	+65	36	78.26%
45	Athenas FF	3	77	12	8	57	71	249	-178	32	20.78%
46	CD Ribert	3	68	9	13	46	70	221	-151	31	22.79%
47	Torrent CF	2	51	12	6	33	85	170	-85	30	29.41%
48	Atlético Juval	3	40	11	7	22	60	104	-44	29	36.25%
49	ACRD Ñaque	2	43	9	9	25	58	125	-67	27	31.4%
50	Sporting Plaza de Argel	2	51	10	5	36	71	204	-133	25	24.51%
51	AD San Juan	2	50	9	5	36	81	215	-134	23	23%
52	Olímpico Fortuna	1	20	10	2	8	66	42	+24	22	55%
53	Casa Social Católica de Ávila	1	26	8	6	12	46	76	-30	22	42.31%
54	Montilla CF	3	38	9	4	25	61	152	-91	22	28.95%
55	Gernika Club	2	52	7	8	37	49	173	-124	22	21.15%
56	UE Breda	2	52	7	8	37	65	198	-133	22	21.15%
57	Gure Txoko KE	1	26	7	5	14	39	31	+5	19	36.54%
58	CD Coslada	1	26	6	6	14	42	76	-34	18	34.62%
59	Atlanta-El Raval FC	2	39	7	4	28	49	198	-144	18	23.08%
60	Club Atlético General Lamadrid	2	42	7	5	30	57	147	-90	18	21.43%
61	CDFB L'Eliana	1	26	6	5	15	51	82	-31	17	32.69%
62	Zarautz KE	1	24	6	4	14	33	52	-19	16	33.33%
63	CD Larre	1	26	6	3	17	48	93	-45	15	28.85%
64	CD Blanes	1	26	6	3	17	35	94	-59	15	28.85%
65	CD Canillas	1	26	6	3	17	36	103	-67	15	28.85%
66	UD Eurosol	2	28	6	2	20	33	96	-63	14	25%
67	AD Las Mercedes	1	23	5	3	15	39	75	-36	13	28.26%
68	SD Retuerto	1	24	5	3	16	35	83	-48	13	27.08%
69	CF Carbayedo	1	26	5	3	18	37	81	-44	13	25%
70	El Palo FC	2	28	5	3	20	30	98	-68	13	23.21%
71	CD Elgoibar	1	24	4	4	16	38	89	-51	12	25%
72	SE Mercat Nou Magòria	1	26	5	2	19	27	107	-80	12	23.08%
73	AAVV Nueva Elipa	1	26	3	6	17	41	124	-83	12	23.08%
74	Montjuïc	1	26	4	4	18	29	123	-94	12	23.08%
75	CD Dunboa-Eguzki	1	22	4	3	15	34	87	-53	11	25%
76	CD Miguelturreño	1	26	3	5	18	33	99	-66	11	21.15%
77	AE La Canya	1	24	3	4	17	27	85	-58	10	19.23%
78	CD Amaya	1	28	2	5	21	24	109	-85	9	16.07%
79	CD Ronda	2	43	2	5	36	59	273	-214	9	10.47%
80	Peña Deportiva Rociera	1	23	3	2	18	29	95	-66	8	17.39%
81	CD Trinitat	1	26	1	6	19	26	88	-61	8	15.38%
82	Atlètic Gavanova	1	24	2	4	18	30	131	-101	8	15.38%
83	CDF Trobajo del Camino	2	46	3	2	41	44	203	-66	8	8.7%
84	Mutriku FT	1	24	2	3	19	32	87	-55	7	14.58%
85	UD 77 Taxonera	1	26	3	1	22	34	125	-91	7	13.46%
86	AD Virgen de la Chanca	1	20	0	4	16	17	93	-76	4	10%
87	UE Deltebre	1	26	1	2	23	29	164	-135	4	7.69%
88	Ikesi CF	1	28	1	2	25	20	107	-87	4	7.14%
89	Motril CF	1	10	0	2	8	2	29	-27	2	10%
90	AD Cortijos de Marín	1	18	1	0	17	21	60	-39	2	5.56%
91	Luarca CF	1	22	0	2	20	7	122	-15	2	4.55%
92	CD Gazteria	1	24	0	1	23	13	226	-213	1	1.79%

==== Final phases ====
Club	S	P	W	D	L	GF	GA	GD	Pts	Win %
Sant Vicent CCF/Levante UD	4	11	7	1	3	28	15	+13	15	68.18%
Añorga KKE	1	6	3	1	2	15	7	+8	7	58.33%
CFF Puebla	3	5	2	1	2	10	13	-3	5	50%
Atlético Málaga	1	2	2	0	0	3	0	+3	4	100%
CD Oroquieta Villaverde	2	3	2	0	1	9	4	+5	4	66.67%
AD Guillén Lafuerza	1	6	1	2	3	8	11	-3	4	33.33%
AD Torrejón CF	1	2	1	1	0	1	0	+1	3	75%
CD Híspalis	1	6	1	1	4	9	20	-11	3	25%
Eibartarrak	2	3	1	0	2	6	11	-5	2	33.33%
CD Sondika	1	1	0	1	0	2	2	0	1	50%
SD Lagunak	1	1	0	0	1	3	4	-1	0	0%
RCD Espanyol	1	1	0	0	1	2	3	-1	0	0%
CF Pozuelo de Alarcón	1	1	0	0	1	2	8	-6	0	0%

=== Superliga (2001–2011) ===
This table includes all games played since the 2001–02 season to 2010–11 season, when the Superliga recovered its format of a single group after several years with four groups and the group winners playing a Final Four. For a timeline of each team's league record, see List of women's football clubs in Spain.

==== Superliga 2001–2009 ====
Rank	Club	S	P	W	D	L	GF	GA	GD	Pts	Win %
1	Levante UD	8	200	155	23	22	649	127	+522	333	83.25%
2	Athletic Club	7	180	127	23	30	552	208	+344	277	76.94%
3	RCD Espanyol	8	200	127	21	62	567	300	+267	275	68.75%
4	CFF Puebla / Extremadura FCF	8	200	98	26	78	413	333	+80	222	55.5%
5	Rayo Vallecano	6	158	103	15	40	403	223	+180	221	61.39%
6	AD Torrejón CF	8	200	94	28	78	401	366	+35	216	59%
7	CD Híspalis	8	170	64	20	86	327	439	-112	148	43.53%
8	CFF Estudiantes de Huelva	5	118	50	19	49	284	241	+43	119	50.42%
9	CE Sabadell	4	94	50	15	29	292	175	+117	115	61.17%
10	SD Lagunak	5	132	39	20	73	164	265	-101	98	37.12%
11	Oviedo Moderno CF	7	170	34	30	106	184	422	-238	98	28.82%
12	FC Barcelona	4	106	34	20	52	155	200	-45	88	41.51%
13	Transportes Alcaine / Prainsa Zaragoza	3	80	25	14	41	103	155	-52	64	40%
14	Real Sociedad	3	82	23	17	42	81	144	-63	63	38.41%
15	CF Pozuelo de Alarcón	5	124	24	14	86	173	391	-218	32	25%
16	CD Nuestra Señora de Belén	4	94	22	7	65	109	357	-248	51	27.13%
17	Atlético de Madrid	2	52	19	10	23	67	88	-21	48	46.15%
19	UE L'Estartit	2	56	19	8	29	87	118	-31	46	44.23%
20	Sporting de Huelva	2	56	15	16	25	71	105	-34	46	41.07%
21	AD DSV-Colegio Alemán	2	56	14	5	37	75	140	-65	33	29.46%
22	Atletico Málaga	1	30	8	2	20	33	84	-51	18	30%
23	AD Peña Nuestra Señora de la Antigua	3	68	5	5	58	50	280	-230	15	25%
24	Gijón FF	1	24	0	0	23	19	96	-77	1	1.67%

==== Superliga 2009–2011 ====
Rank	Club	S	P	W	D	L	GF	GA	GD	Pts	Win %
1	Rayo Vallecano	2	56	43	8	6	202	51	+151	94	83.93%
2	RCD Espanyol	2	58	43	7	8	202	45	+157	93	83.04%
3	Athletic Club	2	56	39	7	10	165	58	+107	93	75.89%
4	SD Lagunak	2	52	27	13	12	86	52	+34	67	64.42%
5	FC Barcelona	2	54	28	9	17	95	55	+40	65	60.19%
6	AD Torrejón CF	2	50	26	11	13	104	63	+41	63	63%
7	Atlético de Madrid	2	52	26	10	16	104	78	+26	62	59.62%
8	Prainsa Zaragoza	2	56	26	7	23	108	79	+29	59	52.68%
9	Real Sociedad	2	56	24	11	21	95	84	+11	59	52.68%
10	Levate UD	2	52	25	7	20	86	68	+18	57	50.89%
11	Sporting de Huelva	2	50	25	4	21	115	86	+29	54	54%
12	Valencia CF	2	52	24	6	22	119	107	+12	54	51.92%
13	Oviedo Moderno CF	2	54	23	8	23	93	95	-2	54	50%
14	UE L'Estartit	2	50	24	5	21	107	82	+25	53	53%
15	UD Collerense	2	50	20	10	20	89	87	+2	50	50%
16	Sevilla FC	2	48	21	7	20	82	81	+1	49	51.04%
17	UD Las Palmas	2	50	14	6	20	80	114	-34	34	34%
18	Atlético Málaga	2	50	12	10	28	50	140	-90	34	34%
19	CE Sant Gabriel	1	28	11	4	13	50	77	-27	26	46.43%
20	SD Reocín	1	28	9	7	12	42	62	-20	25	44.64%
21	SD Eibar	2	54	4	9	41	50	175	-125	17	15.74%
22	Real Valladolid	2	52	4	8	40	40	167	-127	16	15.38%
23	Real Jaén	1	24	3	2	19	23	81	-58	8	16.67%
24	Gimnàstic de Tarragona	2	52	2	2	48	25	225	-200	6	5.77%

=== Primera División (2011–2022) ===
Rank	Club	S	P	W	D	L	GF	GA	GD	Pts	Win %
1	FC Barcelona	11	329	284	28	17	1,185	136	+1,049	880	90.58%
2	Atlético de Madrid	11	329	224	64	41	798	276	+522	736	77.81%
3	Athletic Club	11	329	201	55	73	710	358	+352	658	69.45%
4	Levante UD	11	329	181	67	81	584	369	+215	610	65.2%
5	Real Sociedad	11	329	144	73	112	527	409	+118	505	54.86%
6	Valencia CF	11	329	123	71	135	492	457	+35	440	48.18%
7	Rayo Vallecano	11	329	122	68	139	498	534	-36	434	47.42%
8	Sporting de Huelva	11	329	112	76	141	410	512	-102	412	45.59%
9	RCD Espanyol	10	299	96	70	133	406	476	-70	358	43.81%
10	UD Granadilla Tenerife	7	205	99	40	66	320	283	+37	337	58.05%
11	Sevilla FC	8	235	64	44	127	263	449	-186	236	36.6%
12	Real Betis	6	175	58	40	77	213	270	-57	214	44.57%
13	Transportes Alcaine / Zaragoza CFF	7	214	65	40	109	293	460	-167	170	39.72%
14	Madrid CFF	5	145	47	21	77	178	274	-96	162	39.66%
15	Real Madrid	3	85	48	13	24	149	112	+37	151	64.12%
16	Santa Teresa CD	5	154	38	31	85	147	305	-158	145	34.74%
17	CE Sant Gabriel	4	124	38	20	66	163	230	-67	96	38.71%
18	UD Collerense	5	154	35	26	93	206	379	-173	96	31.17%
19	Fundación Albacete	5	150	31	31	88	202	358	-156	93	31%
20	EDF Logroño	3	85	21	19	45	101	161	-60	82	35.88%
21	Deportivo La Coruña	2	55	19	9	27	85	119	-34	66	42.73%
22	Oviedo Moderno CF	3	90	16	25	49	86	180	-94	57	31.67%
23	SD Eibar	2	64	16	8	40	67	125	-58	56	31.25%
24	FC Levante Badalona	2	60	15	9	36	61	120	-59	49	40.83%
25	SP Comarca Los Llanos de Olivenza	2	64	13	10	36	69	139	-70	36	28.13%
26	Atlético Málaga / Málaga CF	2	64	12	12	40	61	158	-97	36	28.13%
27	Oiartzun KE	2	60	10	12	38	47	141	-94	32	26.67%
28	Deportivo Alavés Gloriosas	1	30	8	6	16	30	63	-33	30	36.67%
29	Villarreal CF	1	30	8	5	17	29	63	-34	29	35%
30	SD Lagunak	2	64	9	5	50	45	202	-157	23	17.97%
31	UE L'Estartit	1	34	8	5	21	35	74	-39	21	30.88%
32	Granada CF	1	30	5	7	18	41	81	-40	17	28.33%
33	FVPR El Olivo	1	34	5	4	25	43	112	-69	14	20.59%
34	UD Tacuense	1	30	3	6	21	22	85	-63	12	17.65%
35	SD Reocín	1	34	2	3	29	30	126	-96	7	10.29%

=== Liga F (2022–present) ===
As of the end of the 2025–26 Liga F season

Rank	Club	S	P	W	D	L	GF	GA	GD	Pts	Win %
1	FC Barcelona	4	120	114	2	4	513	45	+468	344	95.83%
2	Real Madrid	4	120	95	11	14	306	104	+202	296	83.75%
3	Atlético de Madrid	4	120	64	35	21	219	119	+100	227	67.92%
4	Athletic Club	4	120	55	18	47	147	157	-10	183	53.33%
5	Real Sociedad	4	120	51	29	40	195	177	+18	182	54.58%
6	Madrid CFF	4	120	55	20	48	204	223	-19	176	54.17%
7	UD Tenerife	4	120	44	36	40	159	150	+9	168	51.67%
8	Levante UD	4	120	48	22	50	187	169	+18	166	49.17%
9	Sevilla FC	4	120	45	26	49	163	193	-30	161	48.33%
10	Badalona Women	4	120	28	37	55	114	210	-96	118	38.75%
11	Granada CF	3	90	35	12	43	111	145	-34	117	45.56%
12	SD Eibar	3	90	26	19	45	64	136	-72	97	39.44%
13	Valencia CF	3	90	24	17	49	95	166	-71	89	36.11%
14	Real Betis	3	90	20	18	52	81	198	-117	78	43.33%
15	RCD Espanyol	2	60	14	21	25	57	94	-37	63	40.83%
16	Deportivo Abanca	2	60	14	16	30	61	102	-41	58	36.67%
17	Villarreal CF	2	60	11	15	34	53	117	-64	48	30.83%
18	Alhama CF	2	60	8	11	41	47	135	-88	35	22.5%
19	Sporting de Huelva	2	60	12	14	34	44	117	-73	34	31.67%
20	DUX Logroño	1	30	4	9	17	29	54	-25	21	28.33%
21	Deportivo Alavés	1	30	5	6	19	35	73	-38	21	26.67%

== Records ==
Records in this section refer to Primera División from its founding in 1988 through to the present.

=== Clubs ===
- Most appearances: 32 seasons, FC Barcelona
- Most matches played: 775, FC Barcelona
- Most wins overall: 531, FC Barcelona
- Most goals scored: 3005, FC Barcelona
- Most wins in a season overall: 33, FC Barcelona (2020–21)
- Most league goals scored in a season: 246, Levante UD (2000–01)
- Longest unbeaten league home run: 72, FC Barcelona (2019–)
- Most consecutive wins: 62, FC Barcelona (2019–2023)
- Most consecutive wins at home: 70, FC Barcelona (2019–24)
- Longest run of games scored in: 116, FC Barcelona (2019–)
- Best win percentage in a season overall: 100% (28w-0d-0l) Levante UD (2000–01), 100% (30w-0d-0l) FC Barcelona (2021-22)
- Most points in a season overall: 99 (3 points for a win), FC Barcelona (2020–21)

=== Top goalscorer by season ===
Season	Player(s)	Club(s)	Goals
2001–02
2002–03	(Spain) María del Mar Prieto Ibáñez	Levante	27
2003–04	(Spain) María José Pérez	Sabadell	
2004–05	(Spain) Marta Cubí	Espanyol	32
2005–06	(Spain) Auxiliadora Jiménez	Híspalis	29
2006–07	(Spain) Adriana Martín	Espanyol	30
2007–08	(Spain) Natalia Pablos	Rayo Vallecano	24
2008–09	(Spain) Erika Vázquez	Athletic Club	32
2009–10	(Spain) Adriana Martín	Rayo Vallecano	35
2010–11	(Spain) Verónica Boquete	Espanyol	39
2011–12	(Spain) Sonia Bermúdez	Barcelona	38
2012–13	(Spain) Sonia Bermúdez	Barcelona	27
2012–13	(Spain) Natalia Pablos	Rayo Vallecano	27
2013–14	(Spain) Sonia Bermúdez	Barcelona	28
2014–15	(Spain) Sonia Bermúdez	Barcelona	22
2014–15	(Spain) Adriana Martín	Levante	22
2015–16	(Spain) Jennifer Hermoso	Barcelona	24
2016–17	(Spain) Jennifer Hermoso	Barcelona	35
2017–18	(Mexico) Charlyn Corral	Levante	24
2018–19	(Spain) Jennifer Hermoso	Atlético de Madrid	24
2019–20	(Spain) Jennifer Hermoso	Barcelona	23
2020–21	(Spain) Jennifer Hermoso	Barcelona	31
2021–22	(Nigeria) Asisat Oshoala	Barcelona	20
2021–22	(Brazil) Geyse Ferreira	Madrid CFF	20
2022–23	(Spain) Alba Redondo	Levante	27
2023–24	(Norway) Caroline Graham Hansen	Barcelona	21
2024–25	(Poland) Ewa Pajor	Barcelona	25
2025–26	(Spain) Clàudia Pina	Barcelona	21

=== All-time top-scorers ===
Rank	Player	Club(s)	Years active	Goals	Apps	Ratio
1	(Community of Madrid) Natalia Pablos (Note: Official goals/apps numbers from 2000-2013 cannot be verified due to lack of resources)	Rayo Vallecano	2000–2018	442	361	1.22
2	(Galicia (Spain)) María Paz Vilas	Levante UD, FC Barcelona, RCD Espanyol, Valencia CF	2002–2021	416	415	1
3	(Navarre) Erika Vázquez	SD Lagunak, Athletic Club, RCD Espanyol	1998–2022	262	405	0.65
4	(Community of Madrid) Sonia Bermudez	CE Sabadell, Rayo Vallecano, FC Barcelona, Atlético de Madrid, Levante UD	2002–2020	254	345	0.74
5	(Community of Madrid) Jennifer Hermoso	Atlético de Madrid, Rayo Vallecano, FC Barcelona	2004–2022	233	347	0.67
6	(Basque Country (autonomous community)) Nekane Díez	Athletic Club	2007–2023	148	348	0.43
7	(Andalusia) Priscila Borja	CE Sabadell, CFF Puebla, Sporting de Huelva, Atlético de Madrid, Rayo Vallecano, Real Betis, Madrid CFF	2002–2021	147	348	0.42
8	(Aragon) Adriana Martin	CE Sabadell, RCD Espanyol, Rayo Vallecano, Atlético de Madrid, Levante UD, Málaga CF	2003–2019	119	448	0.27
9	(Galicia (Spain)) Verónica Boquete	CD Trasportes Alcaine, RCD Espanyol	2005–2011	109	164	0.66
10	(Basque Country (autonomous community)) Elisabeth Ibarra	Eibartarrak, Athletic Club	2002–2017	104	367	0.28

== See also ==
- Copa de la Reina de Fútbol
- Supercopa de España Femenina
- List of foreign Liga F players
- Liga F Player of the Month
