= 1988–89 Liga Nacional de Fútbol Femenino =

Liga Nacional
- Season: 1988–89
- Dates: 4 December 1988 – 30 April 1989
- Champions: Peña Barcilona
- Matches: 72
- Goals: 291 (4.04 per match)

The 1988–89 Liga Nacional de Fútbol Femenino was the inaugural edition of Spain's women's football premier league. The competition was contested by nine clubs, and took place from 4 December 1988 to 30 April 1989. Peña Barcelonista Barcilona became the first league champion with a one-point margin over runner-up Parque Alcobendas.

== Teams and locations ==
Team	Location
Atlético Santa María del Camí	Santa Maria del Camí
CF Barcelona	Barcelona
Español	Barcelona
Olímpico Fortuna	Madrid
Parque Alcobendas	Alcobendas
Peña Barcilona	Barcelona
Puente Castro	León
Sabadell	Sabadell
Vallès Occidental	Sabadell

== League table and results ==
Pos	Team	Pld	W	D	L	GF	GA	GD	Pts	PBA	ALC	ESP	BAR	VAL	FOR	SAB	PCA	SMA
1	Peña Barcilona (C)	16	10	4	2	41	12	+29	24	—	2–3	0–0	3–0	2–1	3–0	2–2	3–0	2–0
2	Parque Alcobendas	16	10	3	3	46	24	+22	23	0–4	—	7–3	4–0	1–1	2–1	6–1	3–2	4–0
3	Español	16	7	6	3	39	26	+13	20	1–1	3–3	—	2–2	0–1	2–2	3–0	6–1	4–0
4	CF Barcelona	16	7	6	3	29	24	+5	20	0–0	1–0	1–1	—	2–1	1–1	3–2	3–3	5–0
5	Vallès Occidental	16	8	2	6	35	21	+14	18	1–3	0–3	2–1	0–1	—	3–4	5–0	2–0	6–0
6	Olímpico Fortuna	16	8	2	6	35	29	+6	18	1–0	0–3	2–3	2–1	0–1	—	4–1	4–2	7–1
7	Sabadell	16	4	3	9	26	49	−23	11	2–6	3–2	2–3	1–1	0–5	4–2	—	3–2	2–0
8	Puente Castro	16	2	2	12	21	52	−31	6	0–5	2–4	1–4	2–5	1–1	0–2	3–1	—	2–0
9	Atlético Santa María del Camí	16	1	2	13	19	54	−35	4	1–5	1–1	1–3	2–3	3–5	2–3	2–2	6–0	—

Source: AREFE Polideportiva
Rules for classification: 1) Points; 2) Head-to-head points; 3) Head-to-head goal difference; 4) Goal difference; 5) Goals scored.
(C) Champions
