= 1992–93 Liga Nacional de Fútbol Femenino =

Liga Nacional
- Season: 1992–93
- Dates: 27 September 1992 – 31 January 1992
- Champions: Oroquieta Villaverde (1st title)
- Relegated: Llers
- Matches: 42
- Goals: 189 (4.5 per match)

The 1992–93 División de Honor de Fútbol Femenino was the 5th season of the Spanish women's football first division. Oroquieta Villaverde won its first title.

== Teams and locations ==
Team	Location
Athenas	Barcelona
Añorga	San Sebastián
CF Barcelona	Barcelona
Llers	Llers
Oroquieta Villaverde	Madrid
Sabadell	Sabadell
Tradehi Oviedo	Oviedo

== League table and results ==
Pos	Team	Pld	W	D	L	GF	GA	GD	Pts	Relegation	ORO	AÑO	FCB	SAB	TRA	ATH	LLE
1	Oroquieta Villaverde	12	10	1	1	55	23	+32	21		—	3–1	2–2	3–1	9–1	6–1	8–0
2	Añorga	12	9	0	3	45	21	+24	18		11–3	—	4–5	2–1	5–1	4–1	3–0
3	CF Barcelona	12	6	4	2	25	18	+7	16		0–2	2–1	—	1–4	1–1	1–1	4–0
4	Sabadell	12	4	1	7	21	23	−2	9		2–3	0–1	1–2	—	3–0	2–1	3–1
5	Tradehi Oviedo	12	3	3	6	22	43	−21	9		2–6	2–8	0–2	6–2	—	0–0	3–2
6	Athenas	12	0	6	6	11	28	−17	6		1–7	1–2	1–1	1–1	3–4	—	0–0
7	Llers	12	1	3	8	12	34	−22	5	Relegation to second tier	1–3	2–3	1–4	3–1	2–2	0–0	—

Source: Arquero Arba
Rules for classification: 1) Points; 2) Head-to-head points; 3) Head-to-head goal difference; 4) Goal difference; 5) Goals scored.
