= Real Oviedo (women) =

Spanish football club

- Full name: Real Oviedo Femenino
- Founded: January 24, 1980; 46 years ago
- Ground: Estadio Díaz Vega, Oviedo
- Capacity: 5,000
- Chairman: José Moro
- Manager: Pedro Arboleya
- League: Segunda Federación
- 2025–26: 14th in Primera Federación (relegated)
Home colours	Away colours	Third colours

Real Oviedo Femenino, officially named as Oviedo Moderno Club de Fútbol, is a Spanish women's football club based in Oviedo, Asturias. It acts as the women's section of Real Oviedo.

== History ==
Logo of the club from 2001 to 2017.

Founded in 1980 as México-La Corredoria CF to play a friendly match in the local midsummer celebration, the team was officially registered two years later as Meseico-La Corredoria CF. It was subsequently renamed CFF Tradehi (1984) and Peña Azul Oviedo (1996) before taking the name of Oviedo Moderno CF in 2001.

In 1990 Tradehi was promoted to the 8-teams División de Honor, the top national category back then, and in 2001 Oviedo Moderno was one of the eleven founding members of the unified premier league. Always a bottom half team, its best result in the nine seasons it has spent in the new championship was an eighth place in 2003. The team was relegated in 2008 and 2011, and spent the two next seasons Segunda División. In the first one, Oviedo Moderno topped its group but lost to CD Femarguín in the promotion play-offs.

In the 2012–13 season, Oviedo Moderno won again its group but was beaten by Granada CF in its second attempt to promote. However, the club promoted to Primera División due to the existence of a vacant berth in the league.

Oviedo Moderno remained in the top tier three more seasons before its relegation to Segunda División in 2016.

On 28 August 2017, Oviedo Moderno signed an agreement with local men's club Real Oviedo for using their name and their blue and white colors, instead of the club's black and green, since the 2017–18 season, with the aim to be completely integrated into the structure of the club for the 2018–19 season onwards.

== Season to season ==
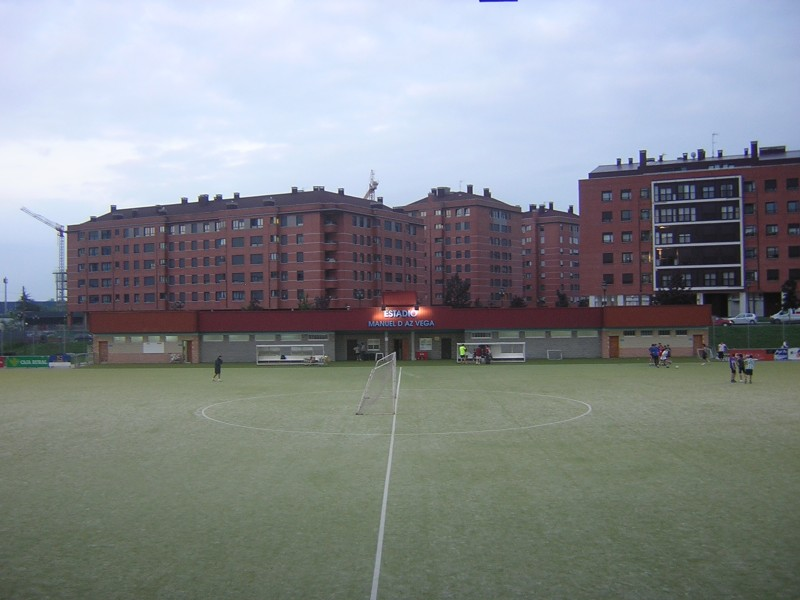
Estadio Manuel Díaz Vega, main stadium of the club until 2019.

Season	League									Cup
Season	Div	Pos	P	W	D	L	F	A	Pts	Cup
CFF Tradehi
1990–91	1ª	8th	14	1	2	11	17	45	4	
1991–92	2ª	1st	10	7	2	1	43	13	16	QF
1992–93	1ª	5th	12	3	3	6	22	43	9	R16
1993–94	1ª	8th	17	5	1	11	17	46	16	QF
1994–95	1ª	8th	18	4	3	11	26	51	15	
1995–96	1ª	9th	15	0	1	14	13	63	1	
Peña Azul Oviedo
1996–97	1ª	6th	20	6	4	10	29	48	22	
1997–98	1ª	9th	22	5	6	11	22	47	21	
1998–99	1ª	6th	20	6	2	12	33	61	20	
1999–00	1ª	7th	26	11	2	13	57	67	35	
2000–01	1ª	7th	26	12	2	12	49	63	38	
Oviedo Moderno CF
2001–02	1ª	10th	20	3	3	14	21	65	12	R1
2002–03	1ª	8th	22	5	4	13	21	52	18	R1
2003–04	1ª	11th	26	5	5	16	25	62	20	
2004–05	1ª	10th	26	6	5	15	27	57	23	
2005–06	1ª	11th	24	6	4	14	41	60	22	
2006–07	1ª	11th	26	5	7	14	29	58	22	
2007–08	1ª	13th	26	4	2	20	20	68	14	
2008–09	2ª	1st	25	20	3	2	107	17	63	
2008–09	2ª	W	2	2	0	0	4	2		
2009–10	1ª	16th	26	11	5	10	56	53	38	
2010–11	1ª	19th	28	11	5	10	37	42	38	
2011–12	2ª	1st	26	25	0	1	116	7	75	
2011–12	2ª	L	1	0	0	1	1	2		
2012–13	2ª	1st	26	24	1	1	120	10	73	
2012–13	2ª	L	4	1	2	1	3	2		
2013–14	1ª	13th	30	6	12	12	30	41	30	
2014–15	1ª	10th	30	8	8	14	35	61	32	
2015–16	1ª	15th	30	2	5	23	21	78	11	
2016–17	2ª	1st	26	22	4	0	108	9	70	
2016–17	2ª	L	2	0	1	1	1	6		
Real Oviedo
2017–18	2ª	1st	26	25	0	1	113	7	75	
2017–18	2ª	L	2	1	0	1	1	2		
2018–19	2ª	2nd	26	21	3	2	106	25	66	
2019–20	2ªP	9th	22	9	4	9	37	37	31	

== Titles ==
=== Invitational ===
- Menton Tournament
  - 2011, 2012
