= CD Lagun Onak =

Association football club in Spain

Coordinates: 43.179017°N 2.262320°W

Lagun Onak
- Full name: Club Deportivo Lagun Onak
- Founded: 1944
- Ground: Garmendipe, Azpeitia, Basque Country, Spain
- Capacity: 1,500
- President: Mikel Izurieta
- Head coach: Aitor Zulaika
- League: Tercera Federación – Group 4
- 2025–26: Tercera Federación – Group 4, 4th of 18
Home colours	Away colours

Club Deportivo Lagun Onak is a Spanish football team based in Azpeitia, in the autonomous community of Basque Country. Founded in 1944 it plays in Tercera Federación – Group 4, holding home games at Estadio Garmendipe, which has a capacity of 1,500 spectators. The team's name in Basque means good friends. Their closest rivals are Anaitasuna from Azkoitia.

== Season to season ==
Season	Tier	Division	Place	Copa del Rey
1944–45	5	2ª Reg.	6th	
1945–46	4	1ª Reg.	10th	
1946–47	5	2ª Reg.	2nd	
1947–48	4	1ª Reg.	3rd	
1948–49	4	1ª Reg.	9th	
1949–50	5	2ª Reg.	9th	
1950–51	5	2ª Reg.	5th	
1951–52	4	1ª Reg.	3rd	
1952–53	4	1ª Reg.	5th	
1953–54	4	1ª Reg.	4th	
1954–55	4	1ª Reg.	4th	
1955–56	4	1ª Reg.	2nd	
1956–57	4	1ª Reg.	9th	
1957–58	4	1ª Reg.	3rd	
1958–59	4	1ª Reg.	10th	
1959–60	5	2ª Reg.	1st	
1960–61	4	1ª Reg.	6th	
1961–62	4	1ª Reg.	14th	
1962–63	4	1ª Reg.	13th	
1963–64	4	1ª Reg.	13th	

Season	Tier	Division	Place	Copa del Rey
1964–65	DNP			
1965–66	4	1ª Reg.	2nd	
1966–67	4	1ª Reg.	7th	
1967–68	4	1ª Reg.	4th	
1968–69	4	1ª Reg.	10th	
1969–70	4	1ª Reg.	13th	
1970–71	5	2ª Reg.	9th	
1971–72	5	2ª Reg.	16th	
1972–73	4	1ª Reg.	13th	
1973–74	4	1ª Reg.	14th	
1974–75	4	Reg. Pref.	13th	
1975–76	3	3ª	15th	First round
1976–77	3	3ª	19th	
1977–78	5	Reg. Pref.	2nd	
1978–79	4	3ª	12th	
1979–80	4	3ª	12th	
1980–81	4	3ª	5th	First round
1981–82	4	3ª	10th	First round
1982–83	4	3ª	18th	
1983–84	5	Reg. Pref.	6th	

Season	Tier	Division	Place	Copa del Rey
1984–85	5	Reg. Pref.	12th	
1985–86	5	Reg. Pref.	13th	
1986–87	5	Reg. Pref.	10th	
1987–88	5	Reg. Pref.	13th	
1988–89	5	Reg. Pref.	3rd	
1989–90	5	Reg. Pref.	4th	
1990–91	5	Reg. Pref.	2nd	
1991–92	4	3ª	18th	
1992–93	4	3ª	18th	
1993–94	5	Reg. Pref.	10th	
1994–95	5	Reg. Pref.	1st	
1995–96	4	3ª	13th	
1996–97	4	3ª	8th	
1997–98	4	3ª	10th	
1998–99	4	3ª	11th	
1999–2000	4	3ª	13th	
2000–01	4	3ª	20th	
2001–02	5	Reg. Pref.	1st	
2002–03	4	3ª	7th	
2003–04	4	3ª	14th	

Season	Tier	Division	Place	Copa del Rey
2004–05	4	3ª	11th	
2005–06	4	3ª	8th	
2006–07	4	3ª	14th	
2007–08	4	3ª	6th	
2008–09	4	3ª	1st	
2009–10	4	3ª	17th	Third round
2010–11	4	3ª	10th	
2011–12	4	3ª	11th	
2012–13	4	3ª	11th	
2013–14	4	3ª	14th	
2014–15	4	3ª	15th	
2015–16	4	3ª	3rd	
2016–17	4	3ª	14th	
2017–18	4	3ª	11th	
2018–19	4	3ª	12th	
2019–20	4	3ª	19th	
2020–21	4	3ª	11th / 2nd	
2021–22	5	3ª RFEF	11th	
2022–23	5	3ª Fed.	11th	
2023–24	5	3ª Fed.	6th	

Season	Tier	Division	Place	Copa del Rey
2024–25	5	3ª Fed.	11th	
2025–26	5	3ª Fed.	4th	
2026–27	5	3ª Fed.		

- 34 seasons in Tercera División
- 6 seasons in Tercera Federación/Tercera División RFEF

== Famous players ==
- (Equatorial Guinea) Gorka Luariz
- (Spain) Unai Alba
- (Spain) Mikel Aranburu
- (Spain) Mikel Labaka
- (Spain) Juan Antonio Larrañaga
