= Añorga KKE =

Spanish sports and culture club

- Full name: Añorga Kirol eta Kultur Elkartea
- Founded: 1922 / 1980 (WF)
- Ground: Campo de Rezola, San Sebastián
- Chairman: Xabier Altuna
- League: División de Honor; Tercera Federación (women) – Group 2
- 2025–26 2022–23: Tercera Federación – Group 4, 15th of 18 (relegated); Primera Nacional de Fútbol (women) – Group 2, 6th of 16
- Website: www.anorgakke.org
Home colours

Añorga Kirol eta Kultur Elkartea (Spanish: Sociedad Deportiva y Cultural Añorga) is a Spanish sports and culture club from San Sebastián settled in the city's Añorga district. Founded in 1922, it comprises football, Basque pelota, basketball, mountaineering, chess, cyclotourism, and Basque folk dance sections. The men's football club play in División de Honor, while the women's team play in Tercera Federación (women) – Group 2.

== Club history ==
The club is best known for its women's football team, established in 1980. Through the 1980s Añorga reached but lost the final of the national cup (until 1988, the only national championship) in 1984, 1987 and 1989. In 1990 it finally won the competition by beating RCD Espanyol 2–0 in the final. This marked the beginning of the team's golden era as Añorga became one of the two leading Spanish teams in the first half of the 1990s along with CD Oroquieta Villaverde, winning three national leagues and two more national cups until 1996.

However, the team declined through the next years. In 2001 Añorga the national federation invited Añorga to take part in the reunified Superliga which replaced the 48-teams, 4-groups + Final Four system held since 1997, but the club declined the offer due to financial reasons, so it was relegated to the second tier where it has played since. As the options to regain its former glory faded, the club supported the newly founded local powerhouse Real Sociedad, which soon made it into top-flight.

== Honours ==
- División de Honor (3)
  - 1992, 1995, 1996
- Copa de la Reina
  - 1990, 1991, 1993

== Season to season ==
=== Men's team ===
Season	Tier	Division	Place	Copa del Rey
1944–45	5	2ª Reg.	2nd	
1945–46	5	2ª Reg.	1st	
1946–47	4	1ª Reg.	5th	
1947–48	4	1ª Reg.	11th	
1948–49	5	2ª Reg.	2nd	
1949–50	5	2ª Reg.	5th	
1950–51	5	2ª Reg.	5th	
1951–52	5	2ª Reg.	2nd	
1952–53	4	1ª Reg.	13th	
1953–54	4	1ª Reg.	13th	
1954–55	4	1ª Reg.	12th	
1955–56	4	1ª Reg.	11th	
1956–57	5	2ª Reg.	1st	
1957–2010	DNP			
2010–11	7	1ª Reg.	5th	
2011–12	7	1ª Reg.	5th	
2012–13	7	1ª Reg.	2nd	
2013–14	DNP			
2014–15	7	1ª Reg.	1st	
2015–16	6	Pref.	4th	

Season	Tier	Division	Place	Copa del Rey
2016–17	6	Pref.	1st	
2017–18	5	Div. Hon.	14th	
2018–19	5	Div. Hon.	15th	
2019–20	5	Div. Hon.	5th	
2020–21	5	Div. Hon.	3rd	
2021–22	6	Div. Hon.	10th	
2022–23	6	Div. Hon.	2nd	
2023–24	5	3ª Fed.	18th	
2024–25	6	Div. Hon.	1st	
2025–26	5	3ª Fed.		

- 2 seasons in Tercera Federación

=== Women's team ===
Season	Division	Place	Copa de la Reina
1989/90	2ª	?	Winner
1990/91	1ª	3rd	Winner
1991/92	1ª	1st	Quarter-finals
1992/93	1ª	2nd	Winner
1993/94	1ª	3rd	Semifinals
1994/95	1ª	1st	Runner-up
1995/96	1ª	1st	Quarter-finals
1996/97	1ª	1st/2nd	
1997/98	1ª (G1)	8th	
1998/99	1ª (G1)	9th	
1999/00	1ª (G1)	5th	
2000/01	1ª (G1)	4th	
2001/02	2ª (G1)	4th	
2002/03	2ª (G1)	3rd	
2003/04	2ª (G1)	2nd	
2004/05	2ª (G1)	2nd	

Season	Division	Place	Copa de la Reina
2005/06	2ª (G1)	2nd	
2006/07	2ª (G1)	2nd	
2007/08	2ª (G1)	5th	
2008/09	2ª (G1)	10th	
2009/10	2ª (G1)	6th	
2010/11	2ª (G1)	6th	
2011/12	2ª (G2)	5th	
2012/13	2ª (G2)	5th	
2013/14	2ª (G2)	5th	
2014/15	2ª (G2)	7th	
2015/16	2ª (G2)	4th	
2016/17	2ª (G2)	5th	
2017/18	2ª (G2)	7th	
2018/19	2ª (G2)	5th (Note: Due to the creation of the new Primera División B, the team remained in the same league but it became the third level.)	
2019/20	1ªN	1st	

== Notable players ==
=== Former internationals ===
- (Spain) Ángeles Arizeta
- (Spain) Ainhoa Bakero
- (Spain) Ixiar Bakero
- (Spain) Elixabete Capa
- (Spain) Beatriz García
- (Spain) Nahikari García
- (Spain) Arantza Iradi
- (Spain) Paula Kasares
- (Spain) Arantza del Puerto
- (Spain) Idoia Sarasa
