= Pla de Barcelona derby =

Football rivalry between CE Europa and UE Sant Andreu

Pla de Barcelona derby Derbi del Pla de Barcelona (in Catalan)
- Sport: Football
- Teams: CE Europa; UE Sant Andreu
- First meeting: CD Europa 4–4 FC Andreuenc; Segona Categoria del Campionat de Catalunya (28 November 1909)
- Latest meeting: CE Europa 0–2 UE Sant Andreu; Primera Federación (14 November 2026)
- Stadiums: Nou Sardenya (CE Europa); Narcís Sala (UE Sant Andreu)

Statistics
- Total meetings: 90
- Most wins: 32 (CE Europa, UE Sant Andreu)

The Pla de Barcelona derby (Catalan: derbi del Pla de Barcelona), also known as the rivalry of La Vila contra El Poble, is the football rivalry between CE Europa and UE Sant Andreu. Europa, from the Vila de Gràcia, and Sant Andreu, from Sant Andreu del Palomar, are the main clubs from the former towns of the Pla de Barcelona, which are now neighbourhoods of Barcelona in Catalonia.

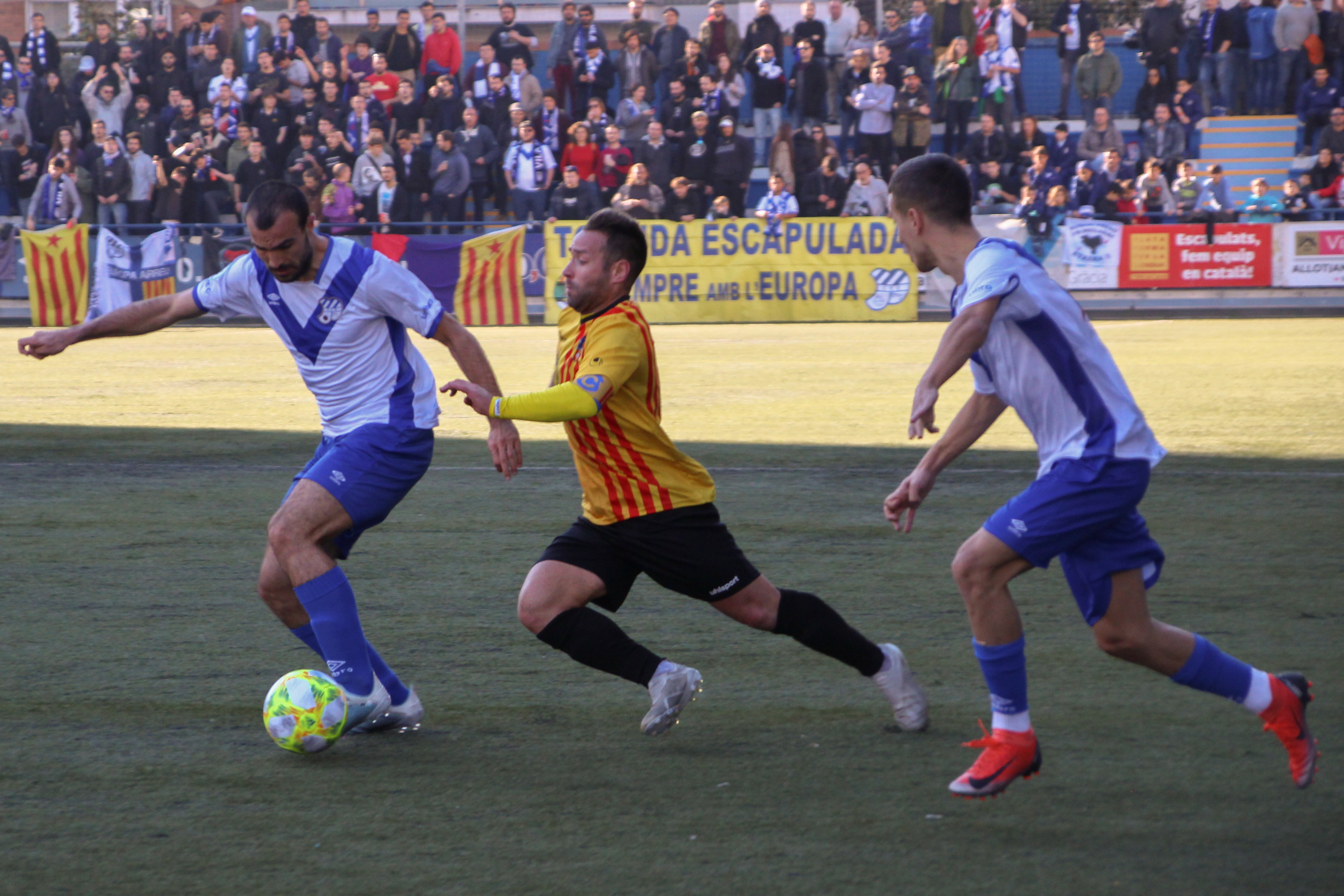
Duel between players of CE Europa and UE Sant Andreu

== History ==
=== Evolution ===
The first matches between Europa and Sant Andreu were played in the last years of the 1900s and the beginning of the 1910s.

But due to the lack of clear and consistent documentation, it is not known exactly how many matches were played between the teams. Moreover, there is no evidence of the existence of a significant rivalry in this era.

During most of the 20th century, there have been isolated moments of tension between the supporters of both teams, but the rivalry was not considered to be more intense than that with other teams from the Pla de Barcelona, such as UE Sants, UA Horta, or FC Martinenc.

However, during the 1980s and 1990s, the relationship between the clubs' fanbases worsened, followed by a period of less rivalry.

Generally, 2007 is considered the year of the start of the rivalry that is still alive.

Since the 2020s, this derby is considered the second-most intense derby of Catalonia after the Derbi Barceloní, both because of incidents between the supporter groups of both clubs and because of the lack of direct confrontations between other Catalan rivals, such as the derby of the Vallès Occidental (CE Sabadell FC versus Terrassa FC) or the Camp derby (Nàstic de Tarragona versus Reus Deportiu).

In 2026, the match gained greater significance in terms of both public interest and attendance, leading Europa to rent the RCDE Stadium, the home ground of Espanyol, to host the derby. As a result, the derby held on 14 November 2026, became the most well-attended to date, drawing a crowd of over 16,000 people.

== Social dimensions ==
Currently, the derby is characterized by the similar social and political profiles of Europa and Sant Andreu.

Both clubs are openly antifascist and defend the use of the Catalan language, values that are shared by their fan groups.

Moreover, both are sports entities that represent formerly independent towns, currently neighbourhoods of Barcelona, annexed by the Catalan city in 1897.

Europa and Sant Andreu are also considered neighbourhood clubs, football clubs with relatively cheap match tickets, close contact between players and supporters, and an active social role in the neighbourhood to which they belong.

== Symbols ==
=== Nicknames ===
On the one hand, the players and supporters of CE Europa are known by three nicknames: europeistes (because of the name of the club), graciencs (demonym of the Vila de Gràcia), and escapulats.

This latter nickname is a reference to the design of the shirt of Europa: a blue chevron (in Catalan: escapulari) over a white basis.

On the other hand, the persons related to UE Sant Andreu are known by two nicknames: andreuencs (the demonym of Sant Andreu de Palomar) and quadribarrats ("those with four bars"), a reference to the shirt of Sant Andreu: four red bars over a yellow background, inspired on the flag of Catalonia.

=== Stadiums ===
Throughout history, both clubs have played in different stadiums.

Europa has played its home matches in the neighbourhoods of el Camp de l'Arpa, la Sagrada Família, el Camp d'en Grassot, el Baix Guinardó, Vilapicina, and the Vila de Gràcia, while all of the stadiums of Sant Andreu have always been located at the same place, concretely in Sant Andreu de Palomar.

Currently, the stadium of Europa is the Nou Sardenya, whereas Sant Andreu plays its home matches at the Narcís Sala.

=== Colours ===
Even though the designs of the shirts of the clubs have varied over the years, Europa and Sant Andreu have maintained the same colours during most of their histories.

Europa has always played with a white-blue shirt, while Sant Andreu started playing with a white and red stripe, then changed the white stripes to yellow, after which it had to change the red stripes to blue because of the beginning of the Francoist dictatorship.

Since the 1940s, the club has played with red and yellow stripes.

== League confrontations ==
Edition	Season	Category	Stadium	Date	Home team	Result	Away team	Comments
1	1934–35	Segona Categoria	Camp dels Quinze	Unclear	CD Europa	0–1	US San Andrés	
2	1934–35	Segona Categoria	Santa Coloma	Unclear	US San Andrés	1–2	CD Europa	
3	1935–36	Segona Categoria	Camp de la Providència	Unclear	CD Europa	1–2	US Sant Andreu	
4	1935–36	Segona Categoria	Santa Coloma	Unclear	US Sant Andreu	2–0	CD Europa	
5	1936–37	Segona Categoria	Camp de la Providència	Unclear	CD Europa	5–4	US Sant Andreu	
6	1936–37	Segona Categoria	Santa Coloma	Unclear	US Sant Andreu	2–1	CD Europa	
7	1939–40	Segona Categoria	Camp de la Indústria	Unclear	CD Europa	1–5	CD San Andrés	
8	1939–40	Segona Categoria	Santa Coloma	Unclear	CD San Andrés	2–3	CD Europa	
9	1940–41	Primera Catalana	Sardenya	Unclear	CD Europa	0–3	CD San Andrés	
10	1940–41	Primera Catalana	Santa Coloma	Unclear	CD San Andrés	0–0	CD Europa	
11	1941–42	Primera Catalana	Sardenya	Unclear	CD Europa	3–1	CD San Andrés	
12	1941–42	Primera Catalana	Santa Coloma	Unclear	CD San Andrés	1–1	CD Europa	
13	1942–43	Primera Catalana	Sardenya	Unclear	CD Europa	2–1	CD San Andrés	
14	1942–43	Primera Catalana	Santa Coloma	Unclear	CD San Andrés	0–1	CD Europa	
15	1942–43	Primera Catalana	Sardenya	Unclear	CD Europa	3–1	CD San Andrés	Promotion phase
16	1942–43	Primera Catalana	Santa Coloma	Unclear	CD San Andrés	4–4	CD Europa	Promotion phase
17	1943–44	Primera Catalana	Sardenya	Unclear	CD Europa	1–0	CD San Andrés	
18	1943–44	Primera Catalana	Santa Coloma	Unclear	CD San Andrés	2–2	CD Europa	
19	1943–44	Primera Catalana	Sardenya	Unclear	CD Europa	3–4	CD San Andrés	Promotion phase
20	1943–44	Primera Catalana	Santa Coloma	Unclear	CD San Andrés	4–1	CD Europa	Promotion phase
21	1944–45	Primera Catalana	Sardenya	Unclear	CD Europa	4–2	CD San Andrés	
22	1944–45	Primera Catalana	Santa Coloma	Unclear	CD San Andrés	3–0	CD Europa	
23	1944–45	Primera Catalana	Sardenya	Unclear	CD Europa	3–2	CD San Andrés	Promotion phase
24	1944–45	Primera Catalana	Santa Coloma	Unclear	CD San Andrés	1–2	CD Europa	Promotion phase
25	1945–46	Primera Catalana	Sardenya	Unclear	CD Europa	2–2	CD San Andrés	
26	1945–46	Primera Catalana	Santa Coloma	Unclear	CD San Andrés	2–0	CD Europa	
27	1945–46	Primera Catalana	Sardenya	Unclear	CD Europa	2–2	CD San Andrés	Promotion phase
28	1945–46	Primera Catalana	Santa Coloma	Unclear	CD San Andrés	2–1	CD Europa	Promotion phase
29	1946–47	Primera Catalana	Sardenya	Unclear	CD Europa	3–0	CD San Andrés	
30	1946–47	Primera Catalana	Santa Coloma	Unclear	CD San Andrés	2–1	CD Europa	
31	1953–54	Tercera División	Sardenya	Unclear	CD Europa	0–1	CD San Andrés	
32	1953–54	Tercera División	Santa Coloma	Unclear	CD San Andrés	2–1	CD Europa	
33	1956–57	Tercera División	Sardenya	Unclear	CD Europa	1–0	CD San Andrés	
34	1956–57	Tercera División	Santa Coloma	Unclear	CD San Andrés	0–3	CD Europa	
35	1957–58	Tercera División	Sardenya	Unclear	CD Europa	0–1	CD San Andrés	
36	1957–58	Tercera División	Santa Coloma	Unclear	CD San Andrés	0–1	CD Europa	
37	1958–59	Tercera División	Sardenya	Unclear	CD Europa	5–3	CD San Andrés	
38	1958–59	Tercera División	Santa Coloma	Unclear	CD San Andrés	2–2	CD Europa	
39	1959–60	Tercera División	Sardenya	Unclear	CD Europa	3–0	CD San Andrés	
40	1959–60	Tercera División	Santa Coloma	Unclear	CD San Andrés	2–1	CD Europa	
41	1962–63	Tercera División	Sardenya	Unclear	CD Europa	3–1	CD San Andrés	
42	1962–63	Tercera División	Santa Coloma	Unclear	CD San Andrés	0–2	CD Europa	
43	1968–69	Tercera División	Sardenya	Unclear	CD Europa	0–0	CD San Andrés	
44	1968–69	Tercera División	Santa Coloma	Unclear	CD San Andrés	2–0	CD Europa	
45	1980–81	Tercera División	Sardenya	Unclear	CD Europa	1–0	UE Sant Andreu	
46	1980–81	Tercera División	Narcís Sala	Unclear	UE Sant Andreu	3–4	CD Europa	
47	1981–82	Tercera División	Sardenya	Unclear	CD Europa	1–0	UE Sant Andreu	
48	1981–82	Tercera División	Narcís Sala	Unclear	UE Sant Andreu	5–1	CD Europa	
49	1982–83	Tercera División	Sardenya	Unclear	CD Europa	2–1	UE Sant Andreu	
50	1982–83	Tercera División	Narcís Sala	Unclear	UE Sant Andreu	1–1	CD Europa	
51	1983–84	Tercera División	Sardenya	Unclear	CD Europa	2–1	UE Sant Andreu	
52	1983–84	Tercera División	Narcís Sala	Unclear	UE Sant Andreu	1–1	CD Europa	
53	1984–85	Tercera División	Sardenya	09-09-1984	CD Europa	2–0	UE Sant Andreu	
54	1984–85	Tercera División	Narcís Sala	20-01-1985	UE Sant Andreu	1–0	CD Europa	
55	1985–86	Tercera División	Narcís Sala	10-11-1985	UE Sant Andreu	1–0	CE Europa	
56	1985–86	Tercera División	Sardenya	23-03-1986	CE Europa	1–2	UE Sant Andreu	
57	1989–90	Tercera División	Sardenya	31-12-1989	CE Europa	1–1	UE Sant Andreu	
58	1989–90	Tercera División	Narcís Sala	13-05-1990	UE Sant Andreu	1–1	CE Europa	
59	1994–95	Segona Divisió B	Feliu i Codina	18-12-1994	CE Europa	0–0	UE Sant Andreu	
60	1994–95	Segona Divisió B	Narcís Sala	07-05-1995	UE Sant Andreu	3–0	CE Europa	
61	1997–98	Tercera División	Nou Sardenya	14-09-1997	CE Europa	2–1	UE Sant Andreu	
62	1997–98	Tercera División	Narcís Sala	01-02-1998	UE Sant Andreu	2–0	CE Europa	
63	1998–99	Tercera División	Nou Sardenya	13-12-1998	CE Europa	4–2	UE Sant Andreu	
64	1998–99	Tercera División	Narcís Sala	02-05-1999	UE Sant Andreu	1–0	CE Europa	
65	2000–01	Tercera División	Nou Sardenya	10-12-2000	CE Europa	1–0	UE Sant Andreu	
66	2000–01	Tercera División	Narcís Sala	06-05-2001	UE Sant Andreu	2–1	CE Europa	
67	2001–02	Tercera División	Narcís Sala	30-09-2001	UE Sant Andreu	2–1	CE Europa	
68	2001–02	Tercera División	Nou Sardenya	07-02-2002	CE Europa	0–1	UE Sant Andreu	
69	2002–03	Tercera División	Narcís Sala	13-10-2002	UE Sant Andreu	4–3	CE Europa	
70	2002–03	Tercera División	Nou Sardenya	02-03-2003	CE Europa	1–2	UE Sant Andreu	
71	2003–04	Tercera División	Nou Sardenya	23-11-2003	CE Europa	0–0	UE Sant Andreu	
72	2003–04	Tercera División	Narcís Sala	25-05-2004	UE Sant Andreu	1–1	CE Europa	
73	2007–08	Tercera División	Narcís Sala	11-11-2007	UE Sant Andreu	3–0	CE Europa	
74	2007–08	Tercera División	Nou Sardenya	30-03-2008	CE Europa	0–1	UE Sant Andreu	
75	2015–16	Tercera División	Nou Sardenya	10-10-2015	CE Europa	0–0	UE Sant Andreu	
76	2015–16	Tercera División	Narcís Sala	28-02-2016	UE Sant Andreu	1–1	CE Europa	
77	2016–17	Tercera División	Nou Sardenya	27-11-2016	CE Europa	0–0	UE Sant Andreu	
78	2016–17	Tercera División	Narcís Sala	23-04-2017	UE Sant Andreu	0–0	CE Europa	
79	2017–18	Tercera División	Nou Sardenya	12-11-2017	CE Europa	0–0	UE Sant Andreu	
80	2017–18	Tercera División	Narcís Sala	14-04-2018	UE Sant Andreu	1–1	CE Europa	
81	2018–19	Tercera División	Nou Sardenya	09-12-2018	CE Europa	1–1	UE Sant Andreu	
82	2018–19	Tercera División	Narcís Sala	05-05-2019	UE Sant Andreu	0–0	CE Europa	
83	2019–20	Tercera División	Nou Sardenya	05-01-2020	CE Europa	0–2	UE Sant Andreu	
84	2022–23	Tercera Federación	Nou Sardenya	27-11-2022	CE Europa	3–0	UE Sant Andreu	
85	2022–23	Tercera Federación	Narcís Sala	02-04-2023	UE Sant Andreu	1–1	CE Europa	
86	2023–24	Segunda Federación	Nou Sardenya	17-09-2023	CE Europa	3–0	UE Sant Andreu	
87	2023–24	Segunda Federación	Narcís Sala	28-01-2024	UE Sant Andreu	2–3	CE Europa	
88	2024–25	Segunda Federación	Nou Sardenya	17-11-2024	CE Europa	4-6	UE Sant Andreu	
89	2024–25	Segunda Federación	Narcís Sala	30-03-2025	UE Sant Andreu	1–1	CE Europa	
90	2026–27	Primera Federación	RCDE Stadium	14-11-2026	CE Europa	0–2	UE Sant Andreu	

=== Summary ===
Category	Wins Europa	Draws	Wins Sant Andreu	Goals Europa	Goals Sant Andreu
Primera Federación	0	0	1	0	2
Segunda División B/Segunda Federación	2	2	2	11	12
Tercera División/Tercera Federación	18	17	18	62	59
Segona Categoria del Campionat de Catalunya	3	0	5	13	19
Primera Catalana	9	6	7	40	39
Total	32	25	33	126	131

== Comparison ==
Element of comparison	Europa	Sant Andreu
General information
Complete name	Club Esportiu Europa	Unió Esportiva Sant Andreu, SAE
Foundational date	5 June 1907	21 January 1909
Nicknames	Escapulats, graciencs, europeistes	Quadribarrats, andreuencs
Colours	White and blue	Yellow and red
Type of entity	Football club	Sociedad Anónima Deportiva
Location
Neighbourhood	Vila de Gràcia	Sant Andreu de Palomar
Inhabitants (2023)	50,048	57,902
District	Gràcia	Sant Andreu
Inhabitants (2023)	120,907	149,826
Stadium
Name	Nou Sardenya	Narcís Sala
Capacity	4,000	6,563
Dimensions	100,5 x 62 m	105 x 64 m
Year of inauguration	1995	1970
Social dimension
Number of members (2024–25)	2,800	4,857
Number of fan groups (2024–25)	16	12
Fanatical animation group	Eskapulats	Desperdicis
Trajectory
Seasons in La Liga	3	0
Seasons in the Segunda División	5	11
Seasons in the Segunda División B/Segunda Federación	4	21
Seasons in the Tercera División/Tercera Federación	57	46
Seasons in regional categories	18	7
Direct confrontations
Number of derbies won, drew, and lost	32 wins, 25 draws, and 33 losses	33 wins, 25 draws, and 32 losses
Number of goals scored and received in derbies	126 scored and 131 received	131 scored and 126 received
Seasons finishing above the rival in the league	42	69
Honours
Segunda División B	0	2
Tercera División/Tercera Federación	4	5
Copa Federación	0	1
Campionat de Catalunya	1	0
Copa Catalunya	3	2

== Bibliography ==
- Araguz i Boguña, Xavier; Becerra i Fortes, Joan Esteve; Domingo i Villarreal, Àngel; Martínez i Calatrava, Vicenç; Petit i Gil, Jordi; Quintana Ramírez, Eduardo; Terrè i Ponsà, Quim (2009). Unió Esportiva Sant Andreu 1909–2009 (in Catalan). Barcelona: Municipality of Barcelona; Unió Esportiva Sant Andreu; Institut Barcelona Esports. ISBN 978-84-9850-175-9. DL: B-30.935.2009.
- Becerra i Fortes, Joan Esteve; Petit i Gil, Jordi; Quintana Ramírez, Eduardo (2025). Unió Esportiva Sant Andreu (2009-2025) (in Catalan). Barcelona: Tarannà Edicions. ISBN 978-84-09-71388-2. DL: B 7787-2025.
- Borchers, Liam (2024). The Story of Europa: A Unique Football Club from Catalonia. Groningen: Self-published. ISBN 978-9-0903-8388-0.
- Vergés i Soler, Ramon (1982). Història del C. D. Europa (1907-1982) [History of C. D. Europa (1907–1982)] (in Catalan). Barcelona: Club Esportiu Europa.
- Vergés i Soler, Ramon (1994). Sardenya, 50 anys d'europeisme (1940–1990) [Sardenya, 50 years of Europeism (1940–1990)] (in Catalan). Barcelona: Club Esportiu Europa.
- Vergés i Soler, Ramon (2009). Història d'un històric: CE Europa (1907–2007) [History of an historic club: CE Europa (1907-2007)] (in Catalan). Barcelona: Club Esportiu Europa and Municipality of Barcelona. ISBN 978-84-9850-163-6. DL B-21.803.2009.
- Vidal i Buyé, Xavier (2022). Bàsquet, 100 anys [Basketball, 100 years] (PDF) (in Catalan). Club Esportiu Europa.
- Vidal i Buyé, Xavier (2025). Estimar l’Europa a través de les seves històries [To love Europa through its stories] (in Catalan). Barcelona. ASIN B0F4YYFPWZ.
