= CE Europa =

- Full name: Club Esportiu Europa
- Nicknames: Escapulats; Europeistes; Graciencs
- Short name: CEE
- Founded: 5 June 1907; 119 years ago as Club Deportiu Europa
- Stadium: Nou Sardenya
- Capacity: 4,000
- President: Hèctor Ibar
- Head coach: Luis Blanco
- League: Primera Federación – Group 2
- 2025–26: Primera Federación – Group 2, 5th of 20
- Website: www.ceeuropa.cat
Home colours	Away colours	Third colours

Club Esportiu Europa (Catalan pronunciation: [klub əspuɾˈtiw əwˈɾopə]) is a Spanish football team based in the city of Barcelona, with close links to the Vila de Gràcia, in the autonomous community of Catalonia, Spain. Founded in 1907, its first men's team plays in the Primera Federación – Group 2, the third category of Spanish football and second team is active in the Tercera Federación – Group 5, the fifth tier. Moreover, the first women's team is active in the Primera Federación, the second category of Spanish women football, and the second team in the fourth one. Besides, the first U-19 team participates in the División de Honor, the highest category in Spain. Europa's home games are played at the Nou Sardenya, with a capacity of 4,000 seats.

Europa lived its glory period in the 1920s. In 1918–19, the club achieved promotion to the highest division of Catalan football, the Campionat de Catalunya. In 1922–23, Europa was crowned champions of Catalonia after beating FC Barcelona in a tiebreaker in Girona. This triumph gave the club the right to participate in the Copa del Rey, where Europa ended as the runner-up after losing to Athletic Club in the final.

The club is best known for its football team who in 1929, along with city neighbours FC Barcelona and RCD Espanyol, were among the 10 founder members of La Liga. Europa participated in La Liga in 1929, 1929–30, and 1930–31. The following glory era would be the 1960s, when Europa played five consecutive seasons in the Segunda División. On three occasions, Europa won the Copa Catalunya: in 1997 and 1998 by beating FC Barcelona in the final and in 2015 by doing the same with Girona FC.

Europa's good reputation, especially in the 1920s, made it attractive for many international teams to play against the club. For example, Europa has competed in friendlies with teams like FC Bayern Munich, Birmingham City FC, FC Porto, NAC Breda, Hamburger SV, Estudiantes de La Plata, Montpellier HSC, Udinese Calcio, Legia Warsaw, and AC Sparta Prague.

Currently, Europa's main rival is UE Sant Andreu, with whom it disputes the Pla de Barcelona derby. However, throughout the years, the fanbase of Europa has considered different clubs the main rival of a specific era, like FC Barcelona in the 1920s, UE Sants in the 1940s and 1950s, and FC Martinenc in the 1980s and 1990s.

In 2021, Europa became the first club in Catalonia to declare itself formally against racism, fascism, sexism, and homophobia after a voting by the club members to change the statutes. Later, the club started initiatives and actions to realize its ideals.

The club also has one of the oldest basketball teams in Spain, and on 8 December 1922, Europa played Laietà BC in the first-ever organised basketball game played in Spain (won 8–2 by Europa). During the 1920s, the basketball team of Europa won the Catalan championship on two occasions (1924 and 1926).

Other sports sections that the club has had are athletics, hockey, rugby, and baseball.

== History ==
=== Origins ===
Club Esportiu Europa (originally Club Deportiu Europa) is historically recorded as founded on June 5, 1907. Later, two modest clubs in the city, Oriental FC and Madrid de Barcelona FC decided to merge with the already existing CD Europa, adopting its name and league spot. The foundational act occurred at the corner of Passeig de Sant Joan and Provença, and in 1909, they established their first headquarters in the already disappeared Bar-Bodega La Roca, at the Carrer de Sicília, 290, in Barcelona.

=== 1900s and 1910s: The first steps ===
In 1909, Europa made its first appearance in the second division of the Catalan Championship, drawing 4–4 against UE Sant Andreu. In 1913–14, 1914–15, and 1915–16, the club participated in the promotion playoffs, but without any success. In 1917–18, Europa dropped to the third division after a league restructuring. This situation did not last long, as the club achieved promotion in 1917–18 and 1918–19, reaching the first division of Catalan football.

=== 1920s: The golden decade ===
During the 1920s, Europa would live its most glorious years, turning de facto into the second strongest club in Catalonia, under FC Barcelona and above RCD Espanyol. In both 1920–21 and 1921–22, the club finished as runner-up in the Catalan Championship before winning the title in 1922–23 under the English coach Ralph Kirby. After finishing level on points with FC Barcelona, they then beat them 1–0 in a tiebreaker in the Camp de Vista Alegre, Girona. At that time, Europa was also the second Catalan football club with the most members: 6,000, and disposed over more sections than just football.

Subsequently, Europa was the representative team of Catalonia in the 1923 Copa del Rey, competing with the champions from other parts of Spain. Until the creation of La Liga in 1928, the Copa del Rey was the most prestigious championship in Spain. Europa defeated Sevilla FC in the quarterfinals (4–0 and 1–2) and Sporting de Gijón in the semi-finals (3–2 and 1–2). In the Copa del Rey final at the Les Corts stadium, the club lost 1–0 to Athletic Bilbao. According to the local press, Europa hit the post twice and was the dominant team.

Europa finished as runners-up in the Campionat de Catalunya again in 1923–24, 1926–27, 1927–28 and 1928–29.

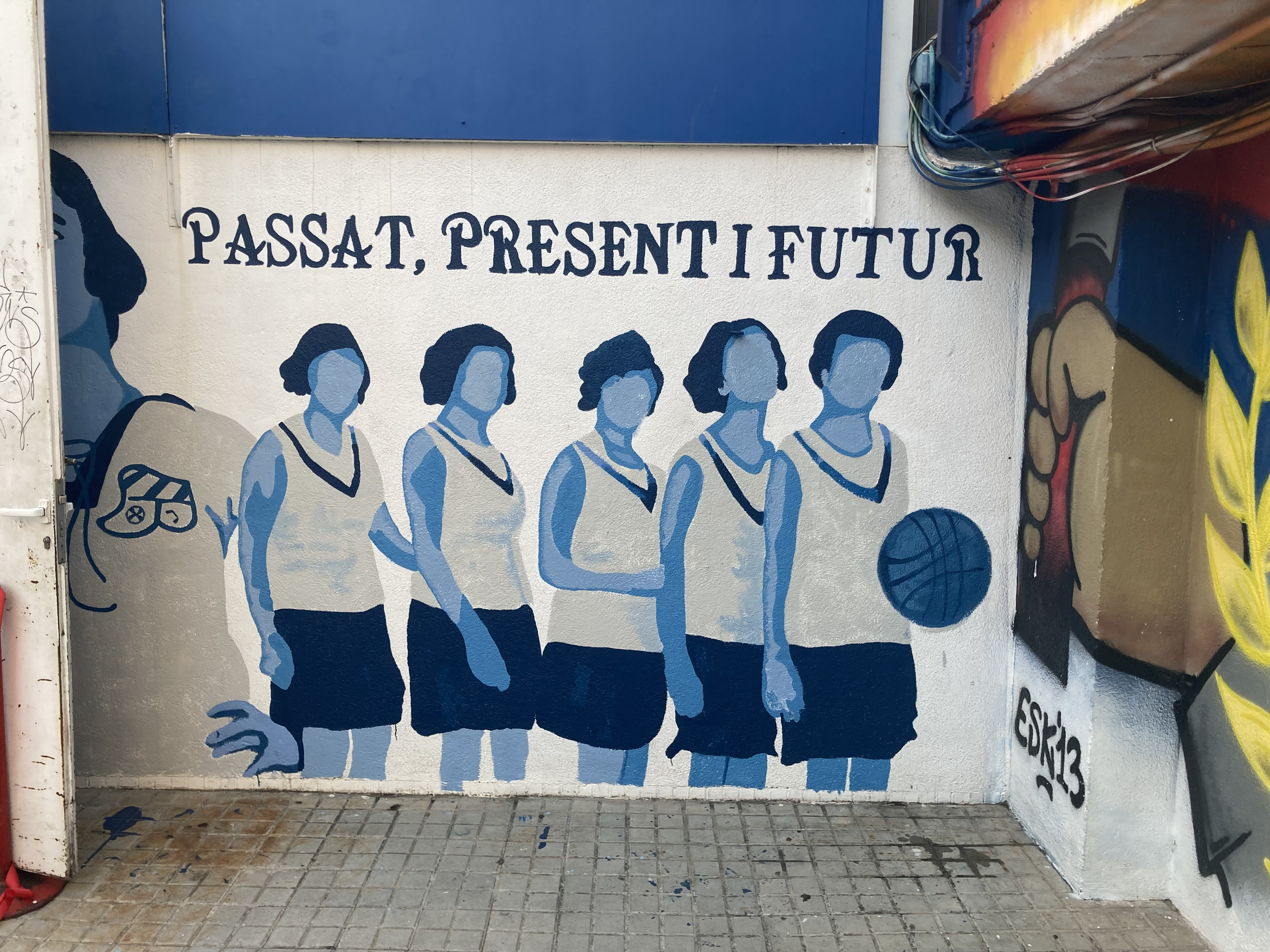
A tribute in the form of a mural to women playing basketball at CE Europa, based on a picture from 1929, in the Nou Sardenya.

In 1928, Europa was invited as one of the 10 teams participating in the first edition of La Liga as one of the finalists of the Copa del Rey. The club made its debut in Madrid against Real Madrid CF, losing 5–0. One week later, Europa received Arenas Club de Getxo in Barcelona and won 5–2, thanks to the competition's first pure hat-trick by Manuel Cros. During this season, the club beat Real Madrid (5–2) and Athletic Club at home, finally finishing 8th.

Europa spent three seasons in the Primera División: 1929, 1929–30 and 1930–31. After the last season, they were relegated to the Segunda División.

=== 1930s: A severe crisis ===
In 1931, Europa merged with Gràcia FC, formerly known as FC Espanya de Barcelona, to survive economically. This crisis was caused by the high costs of participation in La Liga and the rise of professionalism. The fusion club received the name of Catalunya FC. However, the merger was not a success. During the 1931/32 season, Catalunya FC, with three games to go, was unable to complete their fixture list due to an accumulation of debts. Moreover, the club finished last in the Catalan Championship. As a result, the 15 games they had played in the Segunda División were cancelled, and the team was put back to the Tercera División. In the summer of 1932, this team ceased to exist.

During the same 1931–32 season, some members of Europa who did not support the fusion maintained an amateur team under the same identity as the Europa from before. This way, the spirit of the club managed to survive after the disappearance of Catalunya FC. Slowly and carefully, the club was rebuilt in the lowest division of Catalan football. The directors acquired a stadium, were able to compose a team, and, most importantly, secured the continuance of the club.

In 1935–36, Europa almost achieved promotion to the first division of the Catalan Championship. After the outbreak of the Civil War, football in Catalonia continued, despite the difficulties. During this period, the club reached the first division of Catalan football. In 1939, its stadium suffered too much damage and could not be used anymore. After the war, the new authorities cancelled all the results of the competitions played during the war, meaning that Europa returned to the second division.

In 1939–40, the club ended 2nd in the second tier but had no option to compete for promotion to the first tier, as the regional championships were dissolved to create regional divisions within the Spanish football pyramid.

Until 1940, the regional and national championships functioned independently. Between 1939 and 1940, Europa played its home games in the stadiums of other local teams, like FC Martinenc, UE Sant Andreu, and UE Sants.

=== 1940s: Playing in the regional leagues ===
After the disappearance of the Catalan Championship, Europa was placed in the Primera A for the 1940–41 season, a competition directly inferior to the Tercera División. The team's results were not good enough and led to relegation. However, there were also positive developments, such as the opening of the Sardenya stadium in 1940. After two seasons in the Primera B, Europa returned to the Primera A, maintaining their place in this competition between 1943 and 1951.

=== 1950s: Debut in the Tercera División ===
In 1950–51, Europa played a marvellous season and achieved promotion to the Tercera División, the third tier of Spanish football at the time. Between 1951 and 1961, the club stayed up without too much trouble, even attempting to achieve promotion to the Segunda División on some occasions.

=== 1960s: Promotion to the Segunda División ===
After ten seasons in the middle of the table, Europa was crowned champions in 1961–62. However, the club missed out on promotion after losing the playoffs final to UP Langreo. In 1962–63, luck was on Europa's side, and the team went up to the second division after beating UD Mahón (4–0 and 2–2) and Caudal Deportivo (1–1 and 6–2).

Europa participated for five consecutive seasons in the Segunda División, between 1963 and 1968. During these years, considered the second golden era of the club, Europa's best season was 1963–64 when they finished third, very close to promotion to the Primera División.

Another remarkable feat was beating Real Zaragoza with los Cinco Magníficos in the 1966–67 Copa del Rey, even though the Aragonese team was the defending champion. During the same season, Europa ended on a notable 6th place in the Segunda División.

A league restructuring in 1967–68, reducing the number of groups in the Segunda División from two to one, put Europa back in the Tercera División.

=== 1970s and 1980s: Difficult times ===
After the relegation, Europa played some good seasons in the Tercera División and was close to returning to the second tier. Nevertheless, from 1971–72 onwards, the results worsened significantly, and in 1973–74, the club was even relegated to the Regional Preferent. These were tough times for the club, only returning to the Tercera División in 1977. After the promotion, Europa finished many seasons in the lower part of the classification and could not avoid a second relegation to the highest regional league in 1986. Again, it would take three years to go up to the Tercera División.

During the 1985–86 season, Europa changed its official name from the Spanish Club Deportivo Europa to the Catalan Club Esportiu Europa.

=== 1990s: Winning two Copes Catalunya ===
Upon returning to the Tercera División in 1989–90, Europa played a promising season and even competed for promotion to the Segunda División B, which had become the third category of Spanish football in 1977. However, during following seasons, the club finished in lower places on the table.

Moreover, between 1992 and 1995, Europa had to play its home matches outside of its stadium. The Municipality of Barcelona, owner of the ground on which the stadium was built, decided to completely reconstruct the building. The renovation started with the construction of an underground parking lot, after which the installation of stands, a field, a swimming pool, and a sports complex next to the football field was realized. Moreover, the stadium disposes of artificial grass and all facilities that modern stadiums require. Meanwhile, Europa played its home games at the stadiums of FC Martinenc and UA Horta.

Despite the difficulties, Europa's results during the construction period improved. In 1993–94, the club finished 4th and participated in the playoffs for promotion to the Segunda División B, in which they achieved that goal after a close battle with CD Roldán from Murcia, CD Montuïri from Mallorca, and Pinoso CF from Valencia.

The 1994–95 season in the bronze category was, from a purely results-based perspective, horrible. Europa could not compete with other teams with a higher budget and did not dispose of its own stadium. The club was relegated to the Tercera División. On the other hand, the supporters of Europa celebrated the (re)opening of the Sardenya stadium, renamed to Nou Sardenya, on 4 May 1995. It was too late to contribute to the battle against relegation (as a matter of fact, Europa would only start to use the new stadium in the next season), but it turned out to be a boost for the club in the following years.

On 15 August 1995, coinciding with the Festa Major de Gràcia, Europa made its debut in the new stadium. The friendly match against UE Lleida turned out to be the first edition of the Vila de Gràcia Trophy.

After the inauguration of the Nou Sardenya, the club qualified for the promotion playoffs in the Tercera División in 1995–96, 1996–97, 1998–99, and 2000–01, without achieving its goal.

In the meantime, more editions of the Vila de Gràcia Trophy were organised, which turned into an annual tradition. Furthermore, the football school of Europa was established during these years, a school that would grow every year.

==== A historic double: the Copa Catalunya (1997 and 1998) ====
The most remarkable feat of this decade is, without a doubt, the amazing results in the Copa Catalunya in 1997 and 1998, in which Europa beat teams like CE Sabadell FC, RCD Espanyol, and FC Barcelona to conquer two trophies. In the 1996–97 season, Europa knocked out Sabadell (1–0) and Espanyol (0–0) in the semi-finals played at the Nova Creu Alta (the draw between Sabadell and Espanyol placed Europa for the final). In the final, played in the stadium of CE L'Hospitalet, Europa defeated reigning UEFA Cup Winners' Cup champions FC Barcelona by 3–1 in a historic match.

In the 1997–98 season, Europa repeated something that was deemed irrepetible. In the semi-final, played at the Nou Sardenya, the team won against Espanyol (2–0). In the final, disputed in FC Barcelona's Mini Estadi, Europa faced Barça yet again and drew 1–1, winning the penalty series (3–4). FC Barcelona had won the national double that season, but could not beat Europa.

=== 2000s: Growth in all aspects ===
During the first decade of the new century, Europa finished in discrete places in the Tercera División, close to relegation. In 2003–04, the team suffered a dropdown, but returned to the Tercera División one year later, after which the team finished in some mid-table positions.

Since 2001, Europa has witnessed a growth on many levels. The youth academy kept on growing until reaching a number of over 30 teams, facilitated by the opening of a second stadium: the Camp de l'Àliga. Also in 2001, the women's team was created, as well as many new fan groups. Moreover, Europa presented its own website (2001), television channel (2003), radio channel (2008), and newspaper (2010). Meanwhile, the club recovered its basketball and futsal sections, even though these would disappear rapidly.

During the 2007–08 season, Europa celebrated its centenary. One of the many festivities was the celebration of a friendly game against CA Osasuna in the Nou Sardenya, which ended 1–2 in favor of the Navarrese team.

=== 2010s and 2020s: Boost of results and fanbase ===
By 2012, Europa started playing strong seasons in the Tercera División, after many years of mediocre results. The club qualified four times in a row for the playoffs for promotion to the Segunda División B, which could be achieved after surviving three rounds against teams from other groups.

In 2012–13, Europa ended 3rd in the league. In the first round of the playoffs, Europa was paired with Arandina CF from Castile and León. Europa lost 0–1 at home and 2–0 away, being knocked out.

In 2013–14, Europa ended 3rd again. In the first round of the playoffs, the club beat UD Mutilvera from Navarre (1–0 and 0–0), but was defeated in the second round by UD Socuéllamos from Castile-La Mancha (0–0 and 2–0).

In 2014–15, the club finished 3rd again, but lost in the first round of the playoffs to Jerez CF from Extremadura (1–0 and 2–0).

In 2015–16, Europa ended 3rd for the fourth time in a row. In the first round of the playoffs, Europa was beaten by San Fernando CD from Andalusia (1–1 and 2–3).

However, there was also good news. Europa won a third edition of the Copa Catalunya in 2014–15, after beating Girona FC in the final by 2–1. This final was won in the Nou Sardenya, which allowed many supporters to witness this historic night.

After four similar seasons, Europa's results worsened in the following years, alternating high and low classifications. The 2019–20 season started promising, as Europa was one of the contenders for the title, but was interrupted by the COVID-19 pandemic. The regular season was suspended and the fourth highest-placed teams, including Europa, were placed in a small tournament for promotion. Europa lost 1–0 to Terrassa FC.

In 2020–21, Europa was more successful. The unusual season (still affected by the pandemic) resulted in a title for the club. The team achieved direct promotion to the new Segunda División RFEF, the new fourth tier of Spanish football.

2021–22 did not transpire as Europa hoped. It turned out to be a tough competition and resulted in relegation for the club. The next season, however, finished positively. The first men's team returned to the Segunda Federación, the first women's team achieved promotion to the Primera Federación, the men's reserve team achieved promotion to the Lliga Elit, and the first U-19 team achieved promotion to the División de Honor.

Moreover, in 2023, Europa announced more than a doubling of the number of club members (to 1,800) and broke the attendance record. In the summer of 2024 the team reached the play-offs for promotion to Primera Federación, however, they were eliminated in the first round by Betis Deportivo Balompié.

In the 2024–25 season CE Europa achieved the championship of Group 3 of the Segunda Federación, winning promotion to the Primera Federación.

In the summer of 2025, CE Europa began to face the complexities of sporting growth within the Spanish football pyramid. Due to the need for a larger budget, the club launched a crowdfunding campaign to raise funds, successfully securing €225,365. On the other hand, the team was forced to find a new ground because the regulations of the Primera Federación require clubs to play on natural grass pitches, a requirement that cannot be met at Nou Sardenya. Consequently, starting in January 2026, the team will play its home matches at a temporary stadium built in Can Dragó, a sports complex located four kilometers from the Vila de Gràcia.

== Stadium ==
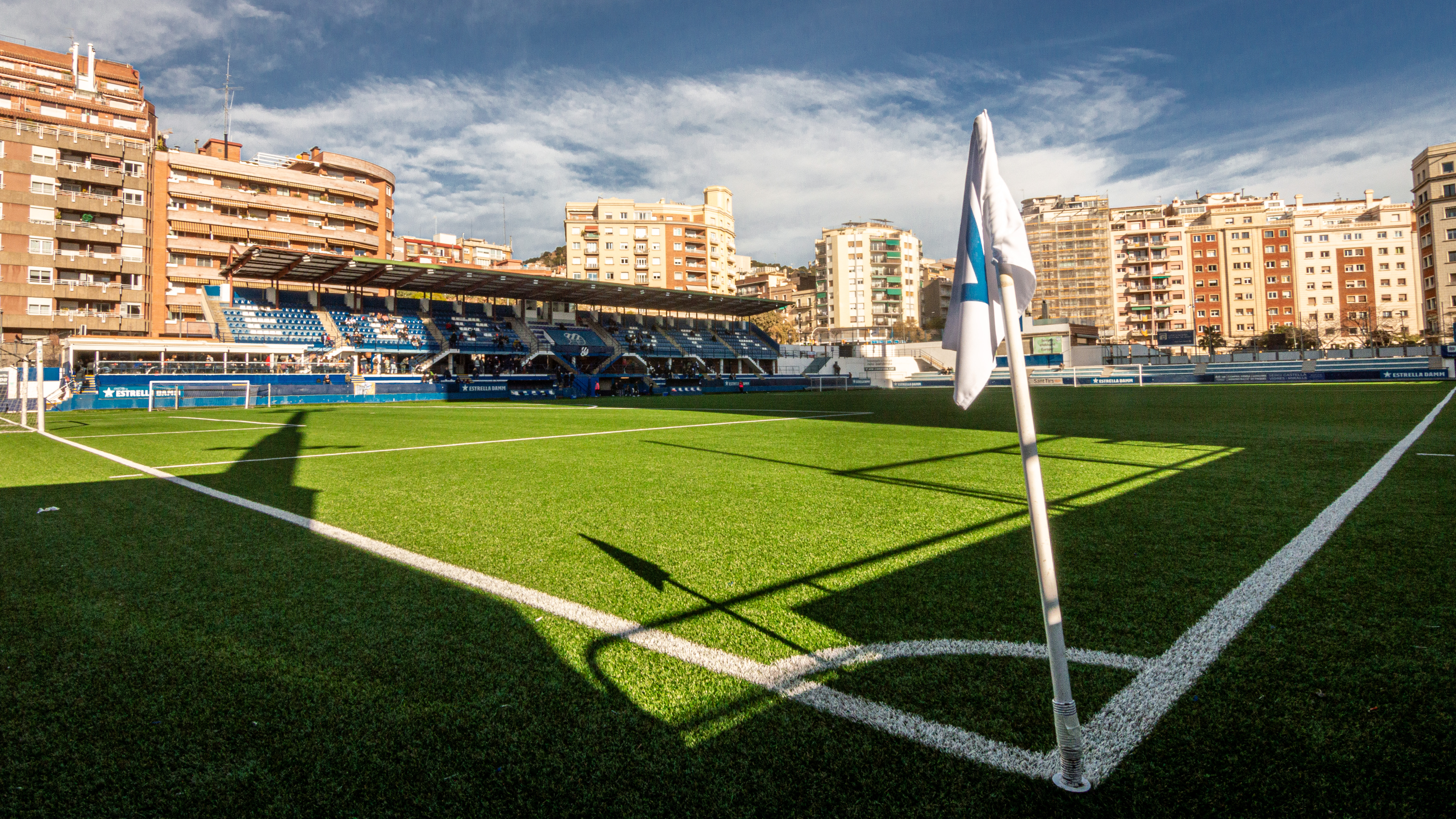
The Nou Sardenya stadium

=== Nou Sardenya ===
Europa plays its home matches in the Nou Sardenya, opened on 1 December 1940 and completely rebuilt in 1995. It is located in the Vila de Gràcia, between the streets of Sardenya (from which it has its name), Camèlies, and Pau Alsina. It has a capacity of 4,000, artificial grass, and dimensions 100x63 meters.

=== Can Dragó ===
Since January 2026, Europa has been forced to play its home matches in the Primera Federación at a temporary stadium located in Can Dragó, a park and sports complex located in Nou Barris, a district of Barcelona. The stadium has a capacity to hold 3,000 spectators and features natural grass, a mandatory condition for Primera Federación clubs, so Europa will continue to play its matches in competitions such as Copa del Rey and Copa Catalunya at Nou Sardenya.

=== Camp de l'Àliga ===
Since 2001, Europa has managed the Camp de l'Àliga, a municipality-owned stadium built in 1991 in the Gràcia district, in the neighborhood of Vallcarca i els Penitents. This allowed the club to expand the football school and increase the number of teams in the youth academy. The field used to be made out of dirt, but has had artificial grass since 2004.

=== Previous fields ===
Throughout the years, Europa has played its home matches in many different fields in Barcelona. Out of all of them, the Camp del Guinardó was the most important and representative one.

- Between 1907 and 1909, Europa played on a very modest field between the streets of Indústria, Sant Antoni Maria Claret, Trinxant, and Guinardó, in the neighborhood of Camp de l'Arpa del Clot. The incompliance with the stadium requirements of the FCF impeded the club to participate in official competitions.
- In 1909, Europa rented a field between the streets of Mallorca, Sicília, Provença, and Nàpols, very close to the Sagrada Família. The club had to leave the stadium in 1912 due to the expansion of l'Eixample.
- In 1912, the club moved to a stadium between the streets of Lepant, Còrsega, Padilla, and Rosselló, still not far removed from the Sagrada Família. Five years later, Europa was forced out again, this time because of the construction of the Avinguda de Gaudí.
- In 1917, Europa inaugurated its fourth field: the Camp del Carrer de la Marina, based between the streets of La Marina, Rosselló, Còrsega, and Sardenya. The move was stimulated by Joan Matas Ramis, the then-president of Europa, who had the ambition to convert the club into one of the most potent ones in Catalonia. This was the last stadium located in the neighborhood of the Sagrada Família.
- In 1920, the club opened a stadium in the neighborhood of El Camp d'En Grassot, between the streets of Indústria, Sardenya, Sant Antoni Maria Claret, and Sicília. This field had stands with a capacity for 3,000 spectators and was the home stadium of Europa during the successful 1922–23 season of the Catalan Championship. Moreover, it was the setting of the first-ever organised basketball match in Spain between Europa and Laietà BC.
- In 1923, Europa moved into the historic Camp del Guinardó, also known as the Camp dels Cuartells because of its location next to the Lepant barracks. It was based between the streets of l'Encarnació, Lepant, Taxdirt, and Alcalde de Mostolés.
- In 1932, after the disappearance of the first team and in a severe crisis, Europa moved to the modest Camp dels Quinze, along the Avinguda dels Quinze in Vilapicina, far away from Gràcia.
- In 1935, the club was able to move into a field located bordering the streets of Providència, Sardenya, and Pau Alsina, next to the location of the current stadium. The Camp del Carrer de la Providència could not be used anymore after the damage from the Civil War.
- Between 1939 and 1940, Europa did not dispose of a stadium, given that the reconstruction of the old stadium would take long. Directors and club members volunteered to take down the forest next to the old stadium, where they built the Camp del Carrer de Sardenya, opened on 1 December 1940. On 4 May 1995, the Nou Sardenya was opened after a three-year-long rebuilding of the 'old' Sardenya, located at the same place as the stadium from 1940.

== Club symbols ==
=== Name evolution ===
Name	Era
CD Europa	1907–85
CE Europa	1985–

=== Colours ===
From the foundation in 1907 to 1918, Europa's players were dressed in a shirt with white and blue vertical stripes and blue shorts. In 1918, the shirt became fully white, except for a blue collar. In 1926, Europa started playing with a white shirt and a blue chevron, which has become one of the primary symbols of the club. Even though the motive is unsure, the most accepted theory is that the shirt has been inspired by that of Birmingham City FC, a team that had visited Barcelona some years earlier.

During the 2007–08 season, the season of the club's centenary, the shirt design changed to one that included the blue chevron and the blue collar.

Europa's socks used to be black or another dark colour until 1955 (all teams used to do this until this year), after which white socks were alternated with black/dark ones. Between 1961 and 2007, Europa's socks were white, and since the year of the centenary, the socks have always been blue.

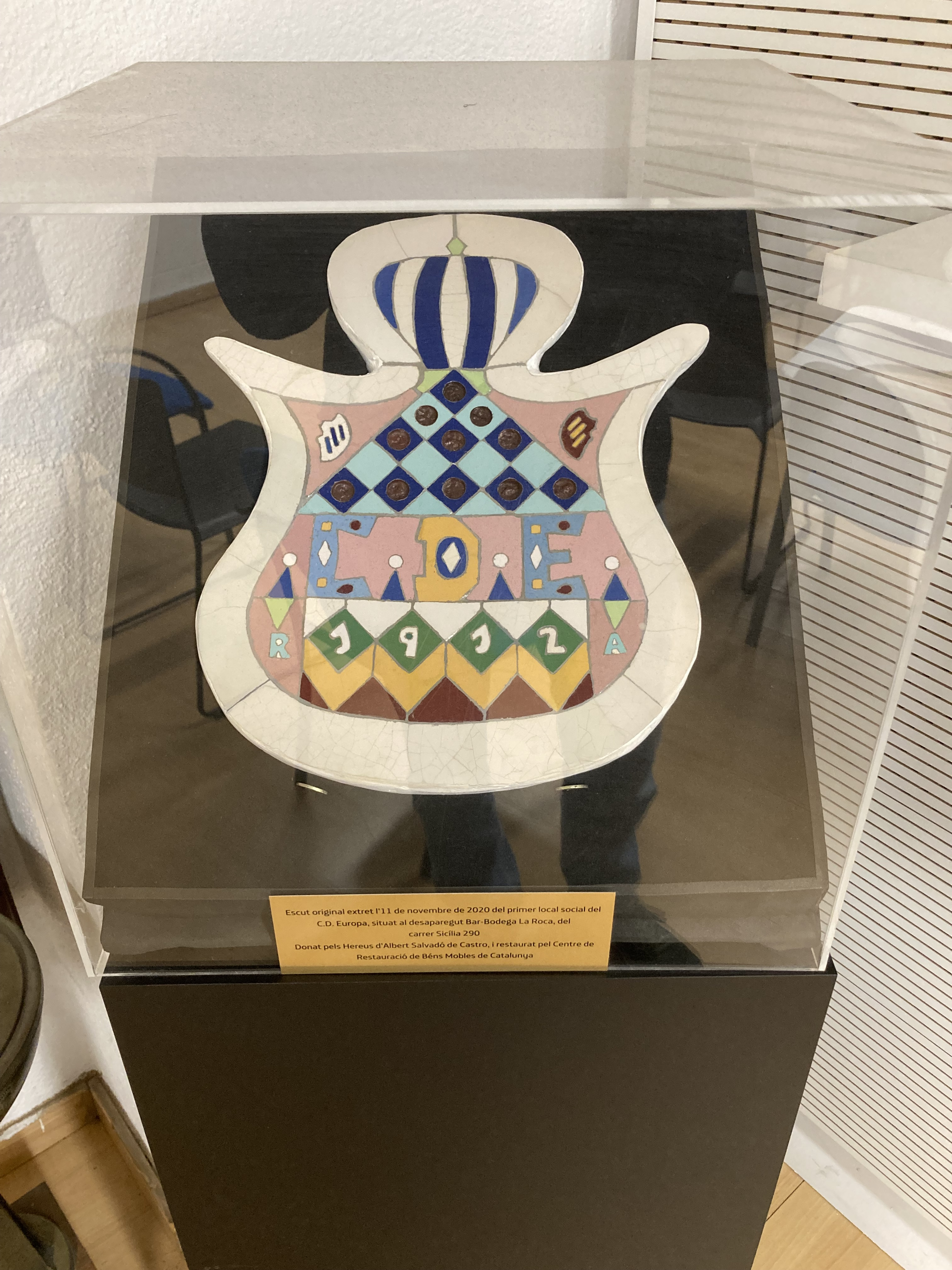
The old logo of CE Europa, probably used between 1912 and 1915, in the club's press room.

=== Crest ===
The current crest, which has been modernised over the decades, appeared for the first time in 1915. It substituted a crest that had been the club's symbol since 1907. The author of the new logo was Jacint Olivé Font, a local artist and a player for Europa.

The crest reflects two of the most characteristic objects in football: a ball and a goal. In the superior area, blue and white stripes still remind us of the first shirt design of Europa. In the middle, the initials of the club can be read.

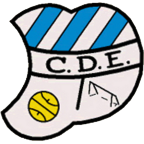
An old logo of CE Europa

=== Hymn ===
Europa's hymn is called Europa, sempre endavant! and was composed in Robert Baquero. The lyrics go as follows.

Catalan	English
Europa, Europa, Europa sempre endavant! no tinguem por del que vindrà el futur hem de guanyar! Europa, Europa, Europa sempre endavant! que la nostra fe en la victòria a tothom faci vibrar Portem amb orgull el blau escapulari sentim els colors ben endintre del cor Europa, Europa, Europa sempre endavant! que la nostra fe en la victòria a tothom faci vibrar... i que la nostra gran història poc a poc poguem retrobar Europa, Europa, Europa... endavant, endavant!	Europa, Europa, Europa always forward! Let's not be scared of what's to come We have to conquer the future! Europa, Europa, Europa always forward! Let our faith in victory Make everyone shake! We wear the blue chevron with pride We feel the colours well inside our heart Europa, Europa, Europa always forward! Let our faith in victory Make everyone shake... And that step by step We can retrieve our great history! Europa, Europa, Europa... forward, forward!

=== Nicknames ===
Europa's supporters are known as europeistes or escapulats.

This last nickname refers to the club's shirt, concretely to the blue chevron (escapulari in Catalan) that has become one of the main symbols of the club.

Moreover, the players are colloquially called graciencs, the demonym of Gràcia.

== Media outlets ==
Throughout the years, Europa has known many official publications, principally in the form of paper magazines, published since the 1950s. Since 2001, Europa created many digital media outlets.

=== Website ===
The club's official website has been active since 11 November 2001, and publishes at least one post per day since 2003. Europa's official website was the first one in Spain to broadcast a live match, being considered one of the pioneers among official website of Spanish football clubs.

=== L'Escapvlat ===
L'Escapvlat is the official newspaper of the club. It has been published since February 2010, and in December 2023, it became a trimestral magazine. It only discusses club-related content and is distributed for free among members and supporters at many places throughout Barcelona. Its name derived from the nickname for Europa's players, escapulats, a nickname based on the shirt of Europa (chevron is escapulari in Catalan).

=== Other technologies ===
Europa has known other online media outlets, such as Europa TV (started in 2003) and Europa Ràdio (2008). However, these channels disappeared after the growth in popularity of social media, such as Facebook, Instagram, and X, on which the club is currently also active.

== Club culture ==
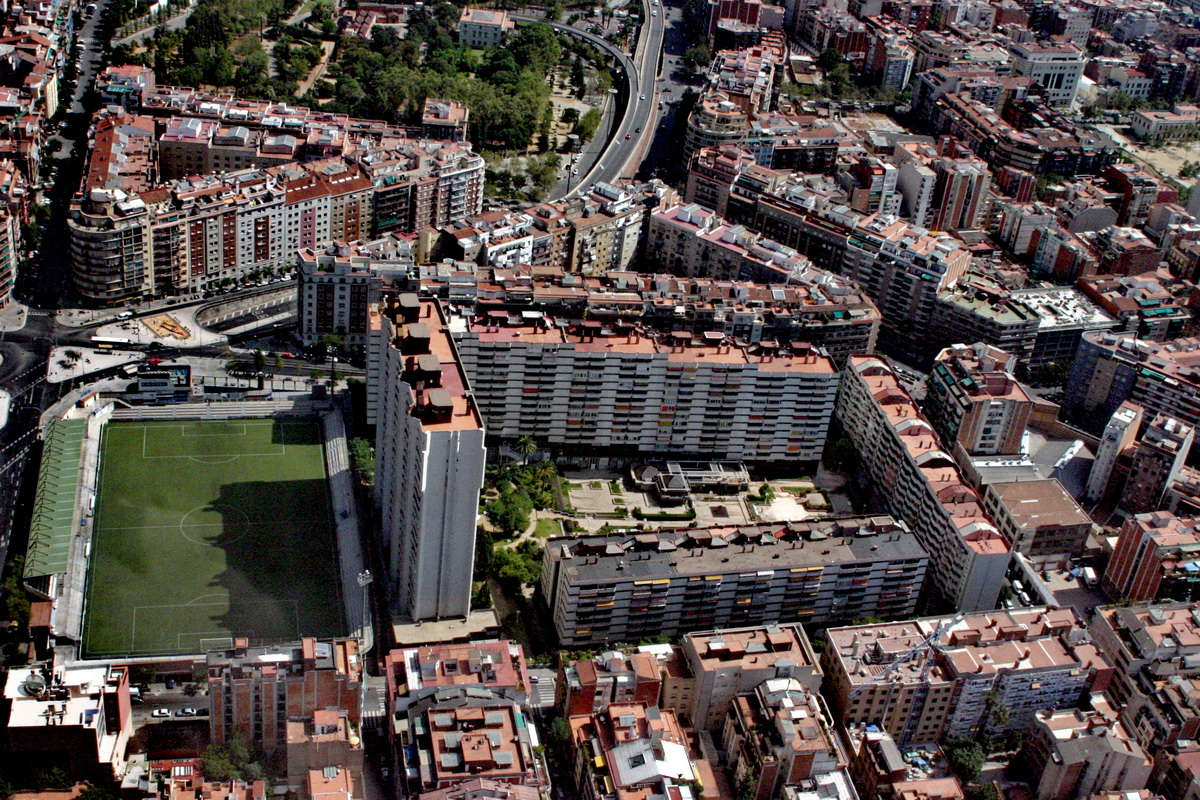
The Nou Sardenya, another view

Europa is often presented as a neighborhood club, a club with relatively low ticket fees, a club that facilitates close contact between players and supporters, and a club owned by its members. These characteristics have attracted dozens of new local and foreign members.

Over the last years, Europa's popularity has increased in national and international news outlets due to its profile as a more accessible club within Barcelona, together with UE Sant Andreu, especially when put in contrast with the professional football clubs from the city, FC Barcelona and RCD Espanyol.

=== Political profile ===
During the 2010s, the club started to revendicate its origins in El Poblet, backed by its social activity in the neighborhood and the creation of the fan group La 290 – El Poblet in 2024.

In 2021, via the DIEM NO campaign, via the Europa became the first Catalan club to declare itself formally against racism, fascism, sexism, and homophobia after a voting by the club members to change the statutes. Later, the club started initiatives and actions to realize its ideals.

Moreover, Europa has defended the usage of the Catalan language during its entire history and still communicates exclusively in Catalan.

=== Vila de Gràcia Trophy ===
The Vila de Gràcia Trophy is a friendly football tournament organised annually by Europa since 1995, which coincided with the inauguration of the Nou Sardenya. The tournament consists of one match between Europa's first men's team and an invited team. Generally, the friendly is played on 15 August, coinciding with the celebrations of the Festa Major de Gràcia and serving as the start of the footballing season of the club.

In 2003, the fan group Caliu Gracienc organised a similar trophy for the first women's team: the Caliu Gracienc Trophy. The tradition was lost in 2013 and recovered four years later, revived as the homonymous Vila de Gràcia Trophy. This friendly tournament is usually held in the end of August or the beginning of September.

== Club management ==
=== Board of directors ===
After the elections on 23 April 2023, the current board of directors is formed by the following people:

Position	Staff
President	Hèctor Ibar
Vice Presidents	Vicenç Martí
Vice Presidents	Àlex López
Treasurer	Cesc Boada
Secretary	Jordi Collell
Spokesperson	Jordi Marí
Spokesperson	Albert Tomàs
Spokesperson	Jacobo Ocharan
Spokesperson	Carles Mur
Spokesperson	Ramon Armengol
Spokesperson	Daniel Sánchez

=== List of presidents ===
Europa has known a total of 35 presidents, two of which repeated a term.

1907–1948: Rodolf Colell i Admetller (1907–11); Francesc Ventura (1911–13); Frederic Soler (1915–15); Joan Matas i Ramis (1915–26); Lluís Ollé i Tintoré (1926–27); Domènec Colomé (1927–28); Joan Matas i Ramis (1928–31); Antoni Massoni (1931–32); Francesc Sugot i Morell (1932–36); Jaume Planas i Ferrer (1936–37); Francesc Sugot i Morell (1937–41); Rafel Andreu i Magri (1941–46); Josep Vieta i Pros (1946–48)	1948–1975: Miquel Iglesias i Puig (1948–53); Ramon Capdevila i Carbó (1953–54); Eusebi Martí i Mingot (1954–56); Lluís Casacuberta i Armengol (1956–59); Joan Pont i Anoll (1959–62); Joan Zalacaín Lascorz (1962–64); Josep Chover i Nolla (1964–65); Diego Navarro Sánchez (1965–68); Joan Lluís Nadal de Quadras (1968–71); Francesc Hidalgo i Barriuso (1971–74); Màrius de Boet i Robert (1974); Francesc Tarruella (1974–75); Joaquim Vieta i Anguera (1975)	1975–present: Bernardí Balagué i Batlles (1975–80); Ferran Valverde i Giménez (1980–84); Joaquim Canillo i Piñol (1984–86); Jaume Martí (1986); Josep Castro i Fernández (1986–95); Joan Grases i Ventura (1995–98); Josep Bartolí Montoliu (1998–99); Conrad Pugés i Rull (1999–2003); Joan Josep Isern i Aranda (2003–07); Guillaume de Bode (2007–17); Víctor Martínez Izquierdo (2017–2023); Hèctor Ibar Torras (2023–)

=== List of coaches ===
- Ralph Kirby (1922–1924)
- Bonaventura Pelaó (1924–26)
- Karl Heinlein (1926–29)
- Joan Bordoy (1930–31)
- Càndid Mauricio (1931–32)
- Amadeu Cartes (1932–34)
- Càndid Mauricio (1934–39)
- Esteve Pelaó (1939–40)
- Càndid Mauricio (1940–42)
- Francesc Cifré (1942–43)
- Josep Montserrat (1943–44)
- Teodor Mauri (1944–46)
- Càndid Mauricio (1946–47)
- Francesc Cifré (1947–48)
- Vicenç Saura (1948–49)
- Joan Pellicer (1949)
- Cristòfol Martí (1949–50)
- Manel Cruz (1950–51)
- Miquel Ibarra (1951–53)
- Josep Maria García Bancells (1953)
- Manel Cruz (1953–54)
- Francesc "Siscu" Betancourt (1954–55)
- Perico Solé (1955–57)
- Benito García (1957–58)
- Marcel Domingo (1958)
- Julián Arcas (1958)
- Mario Anchisi (1958–59)
- Joan Deprius (1959)
- Miquel Gual (1959–60)
- Jordi Benavent (1960–61)
- Enric Bescós (1961)
- Josep Núñez (1961–63)
- Juan Zambudio Velasco (1963–64)
- Narcís Falcó (1964)
- Gabriel Taltavull (1964–65)
- Luis Cid, "Carriega" (1965–66)
- Joan Navarro (1966–68)
- Josep Núñez (1968–69)
- Joan Navarro (1969–71)
- Joaquim Carreras (1971–72)
- Carles Farrés (1972)
- Gerard Gatell (1972)
- Antoni Argilés (1972–73)
- Pepe Rincón (1973–74)
- Ferran Argila (1974)
- Gerard Gatell (1974–75)
- Lluís Muñoz (1975–76)
- Antoni Lagunas (1976)
- Josep Monfort (1976–77)
- Alfred Matamala (1977–78)
- Tomàs Barris (1978–79)
- Díaz Dagoraz (1979–80)
- Alfred Vera (1980)
- Gerard Gatell (1980)
- Joan Navarro (1980–81)
- Pepe Rincón (1981)
- Alfred Vera (1981)
- Antonio Jesús López Cirauqui (1981)
- Waldo Ramos (1981)
- Antoni Celdran (1981–82)
- Jordi Solsona (1982–84)
- Fernando Valverde (1984)
- Jordi Muntané (1984)
- Paco Martínez Bonachera (1984–85)
- Manuel Rodríguez, 'Rodri' (1985)
- Antoni Lagunas (1985–86)
- Julià Garcia (1986)
- Pau Sahún (1986)
- Jordi Muntané (1986–87)
- Carles Anglès (1987–90)
- Martí Alavedra (1990–91)
- Juanito Blázquez (1991)
- Rodri Artero (1991–92)
- Carlos Pacheco (1992)
- Antoni Muñoz (1992–93)
- Alfons Gallardo (1993)
- Josep Maria Rovira (1993–95)
- Osman Bendezú (1995)
- Josep Moratalla (1995–97)
- Tintín Márquez (1997–98)
- Albert Roca (1998–99)
- Juan Moscoso (1999–2001)
- Alfons Gallardo (2001–02)
- Miquel Corominas (2002–03)
- Juan Moscoso (2003–04)
- Josep Moratalla (2004–06)
- Manolo Márquez (2006–07)
- José Ángel Valero (2007–09)
- Pedro Dólera (2009–15)
- Albert Poch (2015–16)
- Joan Esteva (2016–18)
- David Vilajoana (2018–22)
- Gerard Albadalejo (2022)
- Ignasi Senabre (2022–24)
- Aday Benítez (2024–26)
- Josep Maria Gené (2026)
- Luis Blanco (2026–)

=== Former players ===
Category:CE Europa footballers

The following list includes players who acquired national or international fame before or after playing at Europa.

- (Equatorial Guinea) Rubén Epitié
- (Hungary) Zoltán Czibor
- (Liberia) Boison Wynney
- (Paraguay) Eulogio Martínez
- (Spain) Marià Gonzalvo
- (Spain) Antoni Ramallets
- (Spain) Antonio de la Cruz

The following list includes players who acquired local or national fame while playing at Europa.

- (Spain) Manuel Cros
- (Spain) Joan Bordoy
- (Spain) Antonio Alcázar
- (Spain) Cándido Mauricio
- (Spain) Pepe Mauri
- (Spain) Rogeli Pàmpols
- (Spain) Pep Rovira
- (Spain) Ventura Gómez
- (Spain) Carles Capella
- (Spain) Àlex Delmàs
- (Spain) Xavi Lucas
- (Spain) Alberto González
- (Spain) Àlex Cano

Europa's all-time top goalscorer is Manuel Cros, with 113 goals. Europa's player with the most appearances ever is Àlex Cano, with 506 matches.

=== Private Sports Foundation Europa ===
The Fundació Privada Esportiva Europa, or Private Sports Foundation Europa, is a non-profit organisation linked to Europa, dedicated to the social promotion of the club, constituted officially on 10 September 2003. The office is located in the Camp de l'Àliga.

Within the Foundation, different sports-related activities are promoted:

- Promote and make known programs for social insertion
- Concession of sports grants for families without resources
- Support with the name and material of CE Europa to different sports teams for integrating and developing personal capacities
- Participation in the maintenance and growth of the youth academy of the club

== Players ==
=== Current squad ===
As of 12 October 2026

Note: Flags indicate national team as defined under FIFA eligibility rules; some limited exceptions apply. Players may hold more than one non-FIFA nationality.

No.	Pos.	Nation	Player
1	GK	ESP	Lucas Madrigal
2	DF	ESP	Enol Coto
3	DF	ESP	Marcel Sgrò
4	DF	ESP	Àlex Cano (captain)
5	DF	ESP	Arnau Campeny
6	DF	ESP	Joan Puig
7	FW	ESP	Flavio Ribeiro
8	MF	ESP	Gori
9	FW	ESP	Khalid Noureddine
10	MF	ESP	Marc Anglès
11	FW	ESP	Adrián Expósito

No.	Pos.	Nation	Player
13	GK	ESP	Nil Ruiz
14	MF	ESP	Víctor Morales
15	DF	ESP	Víctor Edo
16	MF	ESP	Guillem Cardelús
17	FW	ESP	Youssef Zayzoun
19	MF	ESP	Joan Mascaró
18	FW	ESP	Teto
20	DF	POR	Pedro Cancelo
21	DF	ESP	Santi Pallarés
22	FW	ESP	Adriá Padillo
23	MF	ESP	Tito Tolosa

=== Youth players ===
Note: Flags indicate national team as defined under FIFA eligibility rules; some limited exceptions apply. Players may hold more than one non-FIFA nationality.

No.	Pos.	Nation	Player
27	DF	FRA	Edouard Le Moigne
28	DF	ESP	Arnau Villa

No.	Pos.	Nation	Player
29	FW	ESP	Aiman Boussid
30	MF	ESP	Joel Cadenas

=== Out on loan ===
Note: Flags indicate national team as defined under FIFA eligibility rules; some limited exceptions apply. Players may hold more than one non-FIFA nationality.

No.	Pos.	Nation	Player

=== Coaching staff ===
Position	Staff
Coach	(Spain) Luis Blanco
Assistant coach	(Spain) Alberto González
Goalkeeper coach	(Spain) Pedro Puigserver
Fitness coach	(Spain) Jesús Rodicio
Fitness coach	(Spain) Víctor Molina
Physiotherapist	(Spain) Adrià Lorenzo
Physiotherapist	(Spain) Noelia Balaguer
Delegate	(Spain) Enric Vargas
Video / Scouting	(Japan) Yoshinobu Nishizaki
Utilityman	(Spain) Ignasi Carranza
Head of Press	(Spain) Manel Añó

=== Women's team ===
Since 2001, Europa has a women's team, and during later years, more and more women's and girls' teams have been created in the club's youth academy. The first women's team is active in the Segunda Federación, the third division of national football. This way, the women's team is Europa's highest-placed senior team.

=== Youth academy ===
==== Youth academy and football school ====
The first steps in the development of the youth academy were taken in 1991 when a football school independent form the club was created. Given the good results (both in the league and economically speaking), the school was incorporated in the club three years later. The opening of the Nou Sardenya, the Camp de l'Àliga, and the implementation of artificial grass in the latter stimulated the growth of the youth academy.

Currently, Europa manages a total of 46 teams, 16 of which are registered under the Private Sports Foundation Europa, an entity linked to the club, without any difference in functioning.

=== Reserve team ===
In 2002, Europa reached an agreement with UE Caprabo in the Primera Regional, converting this club in the reserve team of Europa. The club's name changed to UE Caprabo Europa B, but maintained its distinctive identity. The first notable success was the promotion to the Primera Catalana in 2006.

Even though it seemed that the club would be integrated entirely in the structure of Europa, the collaboration stopped in 2007, coinciding with a relegation. Later, UE Caprabo was absorbed by AE Josep Maria Gené.

In 2012–13, CE Europa B was born, a reserve team that formed part of Europa from the beginning. The team started to compete in the Quarta Catalana, the lowest competition possible. In 2022–23, Europa B achieved promotion to the Lliga Elit. In 2023–24 the team achieved promotion to Tercera Federación.

=== U-19 team ===
The biggest success of the youth academy was the promotion of the first U-19 team to the highest division possible: the División de Honor. Ever since, this team has alternated this competition and the Liga Nacional, the second division of youth football.

== Season to season ==
Season	Tier	Division	Place	Copa del Rey
1929	1	1ª	8th	Round of 32
1929–30	1	1ª	9th	Round of 32
1930–31	1	1ª	10th	
1931–32	2	2ª	10th	
1940–41	4	1ª Reg. A	9th	
1941–42	4	1ª Reg. B	12th	
1942–43	4	1ª Reg. B	1st	
1943–44	4	1ª Reg. A	2nd	
1944–45	4	1ª Reg. A	7th	
1945–46	4	1ª Reg. A	8th	
1946–47	4	1ª Reg. A	10th	
1947–48	4	1ª Reg. A	6th	
1948–49	4	1ª Reg. A	11th	
1949–50	4	1ª Reg. A	8th	
1950–51	4	1ª Reg. A	1st	
1951–52	3	3ª	9th	
1952–53	3	3ª	5th	
1953–54	3	3ª	4th	
1954–55	3	3ª	9th	
1955–56	3	3ª	4th	

Season	Tier	Division	Place	Copa del Rey
1956–57	3	3ª	4th	
1957–58	3	3ª	3rd	
1958–59	3	3ª	5th	
1959–60	3	3ª	10th	
1960–61	3	3ª	5th	
1961–62	3	3ª	1st	
1962–63	3	3ª	1st	
1963–64	2	2ª	3rd	First round
1964–65	2	2ª	13th	First round
1965–66	2	2ª	14th	Round of 32
1966–67	2	2ª	6th	Round of 16
1967–68	2	2ª	14th	Round of 32
1968–69	3	3ª	6th	
1969–70	3	3ª	4th	
1970–71	3	3ª	5th	First round
1971–72	3	3ª	16th	Third round
1972–73	3	3ª	10th	First round
1973–74	3	3ª	18th	
1974–75	4	Reg. Pref.	4th	
1975–76	4	Reg. Pref.	6th	

Season	Tier	Division	Place	Copa del Rey
1976–77	4	Reg. Pref.	1st	
1977–78	4	3ª	11th	Second round
1978–79	4	3ª	17th	
1979–80	4	3ª	16th	First round
1980–81	4	3ª	17th	
1981–82	4	3ª	13th	
1982–83	4	3ª	11th	
1983–84	4	3ª	6th	
1984–85	4	3ª	4th	First round
1985–86	4	3ª	15th	
1986–87	5	Reg. Pref.	12th	
1987–88	5	Reg. Pref.	5th	
1988–89	5	Reg. Pref.	2nd	
1989–90	4	3ª	5th	
1990–91	4	3ª	13th	First round
1991–92	4	3ª	16th	
1992–93	4	3ª	14th	
1993–94	4	3ª	4th	
1994–95	3	2ª B	19th	
1995–96	4	3ª	2nd	

Season	Tier	Division	Place	Copa del Rey
1996–97	4	3ª	4th	
1997–98	4	3ª	8th	
1998–99	4	3ª	3rd	
1999–2000	4	3ª	6th	
2000–01	4	3ª	3rd	
2001–02	4	3ª	17th	
2002–03	4	3ª	14th	
2003–04	4	3ª	17th	
2004–05	5	1ª Cat.	2nd	
2005–06	4	3ª	13th	
2006–07	4	3ª	14th	
2007–08	4	3ª	11th	
2008–09	4	3ª	11th	
2009–10	4	3ª	8th	
2010–11	4	3ª	7th	
2011–12	4	3ª	16th	
2012–13	4	3ª	3rd	
2013–14	4	3ª	3rd	
2014–15	4	3ª	3rd	
2015–16	4	3ª	3rd	

Season	Tier	Division	Place	Copa del Rey
2016–17	4	3ª	12th	
2017–18	4	3ª	8th	
2018–19	4	3ª	6th	
2019–20	4	3ª	3rd	
2020–21	4	3ª	1st / 1st	
2021–22	4	2ª RFEF	16th	First round
2022–23	5	3ª Fed.	1st	
2023–24	4	2ª Fed.	2nd	First round
2024–25	4	2ª Fed.	1st	Second round
2025–26	3	1ª Fed.	5th	First round
2026–27	3	1ª Fed.		TBD

- 3 seasons in La Liga
- 6 seasons in Segunda División
- 2 seasons in Primera Federación
- 1 season in Segunda División B
- 3 seasons in Segunda Federación/Segunda División RFEF
- 57 seasons in Tercera División
- 1 season in Tercera Federación
- 18 season in Categorías Regionales

=== Institutional recognitions ===
- Silver plaque in the Royal Order of Sports Merit, conceded by the Consejo Superior de Deportes (2007)
- Creu de Sant Jordi, conceded by the Government of Catalonia (2007)
- Golden Medal of the city, conceded by the City Council of Barcelona (2007)

== Honours ==
=== Football ===
- Copa del Rey
  - Runners-up: 1923
- Segunda Federación
  - Winners: 2024–25
- Tercera División
  - Winners: 1961–62, 1962–63, 2020–21
- Tercera Federación
  - Winners: 2022–23
- Campionat de Catalunya (T1)
  - Winners: 1922–23
- Campionat de Catalunya B (T2)
  - Winners: 1918–19
- Campionat de Catalunya Amateur (T3)
  - Winners: 1917–18, 1933–34
- Copa Catalunya
  - Winners: 1996–97, 1997–98, 2014–15

=== Basketball ===
- Catalan Championship
  - Winners: 1924, 1926

== Fanbase ==
=== Fan groups ===
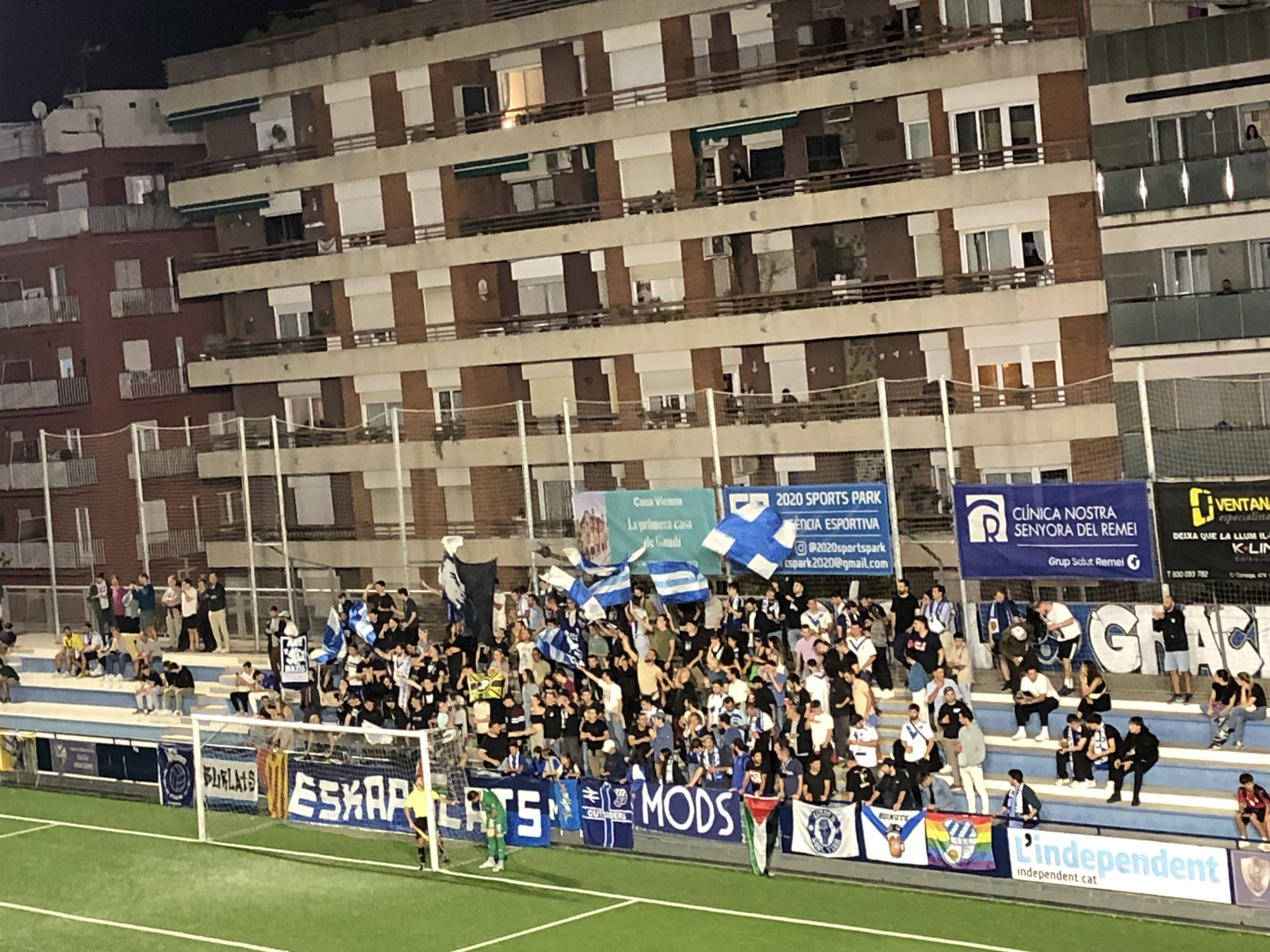
CE Europa's supporter group Eskapulats in a match in 2023-24.

As of the 2025–26 season, Europa disposes of 3,600 members and 16 official fan groups.

Group name	Creation date
Agrupació Europeista	1948
Grup Europeista Pep Rovira	1980
Caliu Gracienc	1996
Torcida Escapulada	2002
Cavallers	2013
Eskapulats	2013
PyonYang Escapulat	2016
The Elements	2018
Xupitos	2019
The Old Bastards	2021
Comelinier	2023
Infiltrats	2024
La 290 – El Poblet	2024
Penya Bescantats	2024
Grup Europeista Carles Bestit	2025
Penya Europeista La Renaixença	2025

==== Member count evolution ====
Season	Member count
2020-21	495
2021-22	442
2022-23	732
2023-24	1.948
2024-25	2.800
2025-26	3.600

=== Social dimension ===
Europa's supporters are known as europeistes or escapulats. This last nickname refers to the club's shirt, concretely to the blue chevron (escapulari in Catalan) that has become one of the main symbols of the club. Moreover, the players are colloquially called graciencs, the demonym of Gràcia.

Europa has a clearly defined political profile since the launch of the DIEM NO campaign, in which the club formally declared itself antifascist, antiracist, antihomophobic and antisexist, being the first Catalan club doing so. Moreover, Europa has defended the usage of the Catalan language during its entire history and still communicates exclusively in Catalan. Europa's main animation group, the Eskapulats, share these values.

Over the last years, Europa's popularity has increased in national and international news outlets due to its profile as a more accessible club within Barcelona, together with UE Sant Andreu, especially when put in contrast with the professional football clubs from the city, FC Barcelona and RCD Espanyol. Europa is often presented as a neighborhood club, a club with relatively low ticket fees, a club that facilitates close contact between players and supporters, and a club owned by its members. These characteristics have attracted dozens of new local and foreign members.

Since the last years of the 1910s, Europa has been known as the representative football club of Gràcia. Before, Europa was known as a football club from El Poblet, as this neighborhood was the place where Europa was founded and played during its early years. During the 2010s, the club started to revendicate its origins in El Poblet, backed by its social activity in the neighborhood and the creation of the fan group La 290 – El Poblet in 2024.

Other territories that are considered to have ties to Europa are the Baix Guinardó, the Camp d'en Grassot, Sant Gervasi, la Salut, Vallcarca i els Penitents, and Can Baró. This was proven by an analysis done by the Club in 2024, showing that 83.5% of the members at the time lived in the Plain of Barcelona and 40% of its members was concentrated in Gràcia. Moreover, the Club had members in over a hundred municipalities throughout Catalonia.

== Grup d'Història Ramon Vergés ==
The Grup d'Història Ramon Vergés, or History Group Ramon Vergés, is an independent association that investigates and documents the history of Europa. The group was founded on the 26th of November 2017 thanks to the collaboration of six Europa supporters with a passion for its history. The name of the group pays tribute to Ramon Vergés i Soler, a club historian, delegate, and director who also wrote three books about Europa's history. The Grup d'Història Ramon Vergés investigates, documents, and explains the club's history in various ways.

The Grup d'Història Ramon Vergés investigates, documents, and explains the club's history in various ways. The association researches statistics, biographies of ex-players, the previous stadiums and crests, descriptions of historic matches, and other historical phenomena related to Europa. Afterwards, the investigations are usually presented on their website or social media accounts, while the group also has a section in the podcast Toc Escapulat. Moreover, the association has published documentaries about Europa, has started the process of the name change of the main stand in the Nou Sardenya to Tribuna Ramon Vergés i Soler, has organised acts and tributes to persons and groups that have been important for Europa, and conserves an extensive collection of historical Europa-related objects.

== Rivalries ==
=== Pla de Barcelona derby ===
The current main rival of Europa is UE Sant Andreu, with whom the Pla de Barcelona derby is disputed. It is considered that the rivalry intensified in 2007, during a match in the Camp Municipal Narcís Sala. The rivalry has been maintained alive since the present, especially among the supporters groups of both clubs: the Eskapulats (Europa) and the Desperdicis (Sant Andreu).

=== Others ===
Throughout the years, there have been different Catalan teams that have been considered rivals by the fanbase of Europa. Among those are FC Internacional (1910s), CE Júpiter (1910s), FC Barcelona (1920s), UD Gràcia (1940s), UE Sants (1950s and 1960s), FC Martinenc (1920s, 1980s, and 1990s), and UE Sant Andreu (since 2007). The rivalries with FC Barcelona, UE Sants, and UE Sant Andreu have been known as the most intensely lived.

== Other sections ==
In the 1920s, Europa was a multi sports club, as everything was still amateur of nature and the sportsmen were able to practice different sports. In this era, there was the section of athletics (around 1920), basketball (1922), hockey (1925), and baseball.

The most noteworthy section was the first one, especially in Cross, which won a Catalan title. Moreover, Europa disposed over a rugby section (1930), the section with the shortest life.

The crisis in 1931 caused the dissolution of all the others sections besides football, leaving Europa to be exclusively dedicated to this sport. In the 1990s, the club recovered the basketball section and created one for futsal, but both disappeared quickly.

=== Basketball ===
The club also had one of the oldest basketball teams in Spain. Europa played the first ever organised basketball match in Spain, on 8 December 1922 in the Camp del Carrer de Sicília, beating Laietà BC by 8–2. It was a successful era for the basketball team, winning the Catalan championship twice (1924 and 1926).

=== eSports ===
In 2021, Europa announced the creation of a subsection of its esports section: virtual basketball. The team participates in the videogames of the NBA 2K series at the PlayStation 5 in the ProAm mode.

== See also ==
- CE Europa (women)
- CE Europa B
- CE Europa (basketball)
- Nou Sardenya
- Pla de Barcelona derby
- Vila de Gràcia Trophy
- Vila de Gràcia Trophy (women)

== Bibliography ==
- Borchers, Liam (2024). The Story of Europa: A Unique Football Club from Catalonia. Groningen: Self-published. ISBN 978-9-0903-8388-0.
- Vergés i Soler, Ramon (1982). Història del C. D. Europa (1907–1982) [History of C. D. Europa (1907–1982)] (in Catalan). Barcelona: Club Esportiu Europa.
- Vergés i Soler, Ramon (1994). Sardenya, 50 anys d'europeisme (1940–1990) [Sardenya, 50 years of Europeism (1940–1990)] (in Catalan). Barcelona: Club Esportiu Europa.
- Vergés i Soler, Ramon (2009). Història d'un històric: CE Europa (1907–2007) [History of an historic club: CE Europa (1907–2007)] (in Catalan). Barcelona: Club Esportiu Europa and Municipality of Barcelona. ISBN 978-84-9850-163-6. DL B-21.803.2009.
- Vidal i Buyé, Xavier (2022). Bàsquet, 100 anys [Basketball, 100 years] (PDF) (in Catalan). Club Esportiu Europa.
- Vidal i Buyé, Xavier (2025). Estimar l'Europa a través de les seves històries [To love Europa through its stories] (in Catalan). Barcelona. ASIN B0F4YYFPWZ.
