= CE Europa (basketball) =

Club Esportiu Europa
- Nickname: Europeistes; Escapulats; Graciencs
- Founded: 8 December 1922; 102 years ago
- Dissolved: 1931
- Location: Vila de Gràcia, Barcelona; Catalonia, Spain
- Team colors: White, blue
- Championships: 2 Catalan Championship
- Website: ceeuropa.cat

The basketball section of CE Europa was one of the sections of the Catalan football club CE Europa, dedicated to the practice of basketball.

== History ==
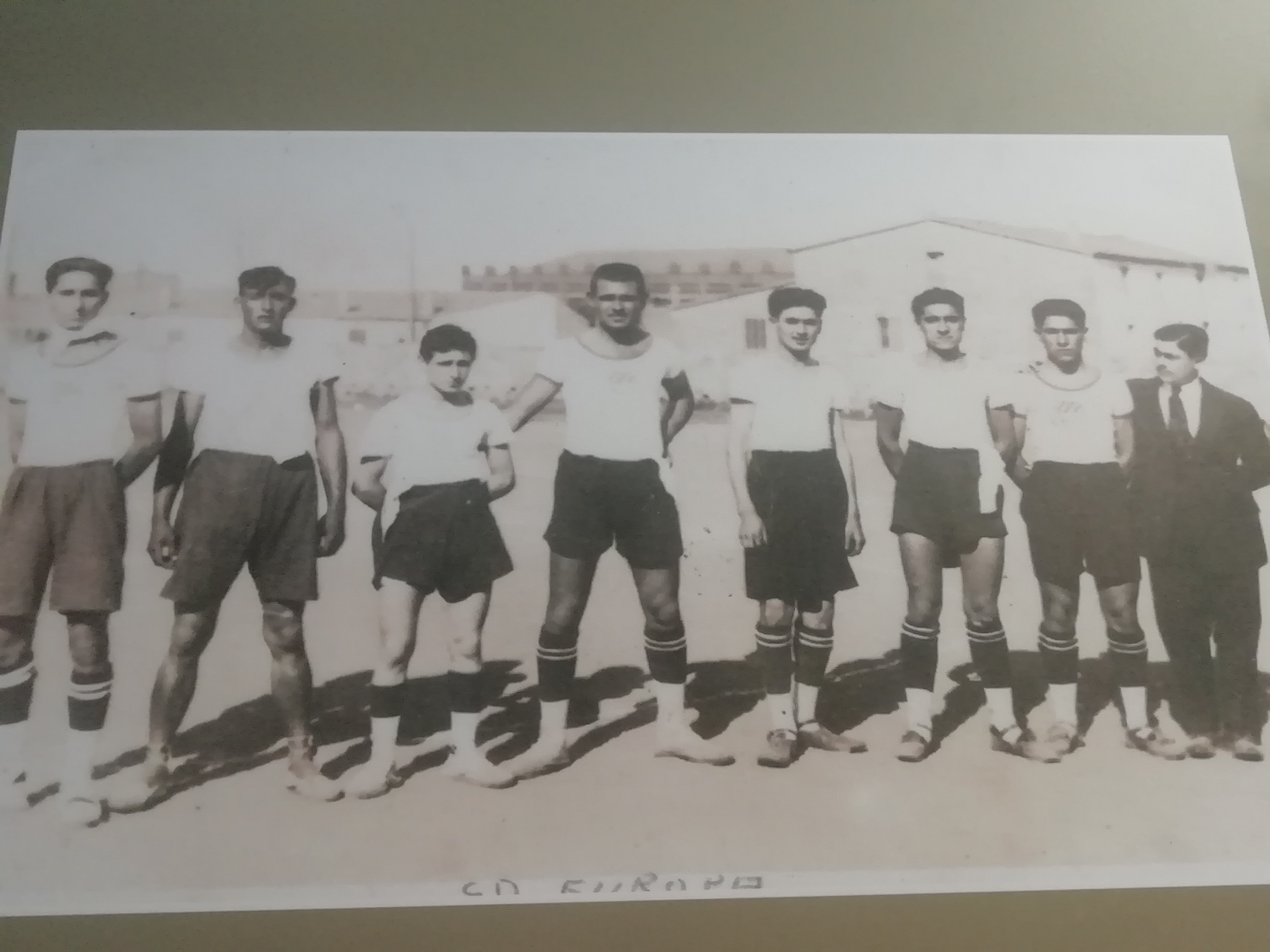
Basketball team of CE Europa in the 1920s.

In the beginning of the 1920s, Catalan society experienced a growing interest in sports, both regarding practicing it and attending sports events.

One of the sports that started to develop in this period was basketball, introduced in Catalonia by Eusebio Millán, who had discovered the sport during his stay in Cuba.

In the 1920s, CE Europa was the second sports club in Catalonia with the most members (around 6,000), only behind FC Barcelona, and was a club with many different practices, including football, athletics, rugby, basketball, and hockey.

=== First stint ===
After having learned basic basketball rules, Millán organised a first basketball match on the 8th of December 1922 between two of the first basketball teams in Barcelona, Laietà BC and CE Europa.

The latter team won this match by 8–2, and its players were Pérez, Julià, Barquens, Xavier, Palom, Brunet, and García, while the coach was Boris Catalán.

Nevertheless, basketball was played much differently then in the 21st century: matches were disputed in football stadiums, the baskets were put on top of the football goals, and there were seven players per team (until 1927 it were only five).

Another way to notice the amateurism of basketball in the 1920s was through the first line-up of CE Europa, given that it included two players of its football team (Xavier and Julià) and one player from the athletics section (Barquens).

==== In the Catalan championship ====
Still, the match was lived with such excitement that CE Europa, together with other teams, started to consider the possibility to dispute a Catalan championship.

After resolving some minor problems, the first Catalan basketball championship was disputed in April 1923, with the following teams: American Stars, Barcelona, Catalunya, Espanyol, Europa, La France, Laietà, and Patrie.

The teams of Barcelona and Espanyol were not related to the contemporary FC Barcelona and RCD Espanyol. The first champion of Catalonia was Patrie.

==== First championship ====
One year later, in 1924, CE Europa was proclaimed champion of Catalonia after beating FC Martinenc 14–9. Its team consisted of the following players: Moncho, Compte, Lagarriga, Font, Ribas, and Palom.

Because of the success of the championship, the league was divided into two groups after the second edition. The winner of the 1925 edition would FC Martinenc, while CE Europa's team was formed by Arau, Comas, Font, García, Lagarriga, Monjo, Palom, and Ribas.

==== Second championship ====
In 1926, CE Europa won the Catalan championship for the second time, beating FC Martinenc again in the final.

The players of this season were Cisco, Brunet, Lagarriga, Moncho, García, Ribas, Palom, Font, and Comas.

In December 1927, the club constructed fields that were exclusively dedicated to basketball, adapted to the norms of that era.

One year later, on 20 October 1928, CE Europa inaugurated new pitches that were even more modern and with a higher capacity than the previous ones.

==== Dissolution ====
Due to the growth of basketball in Catalonia and the entrance of new teams to the competition, CE Europa's potential diminished, while the club itself also entered an economic crisis in 1931, leading to the dissolution of the basketball section.

=== Recovery ===
Only in the 21st century, concretely in 2007, the year of the club's centenary, CE Europa recovered its basketball section, with Joan Padró as coach.

The team played in the Creueta del Coll and achieved promotion to the Segona Catalana in 2008. The basketball team would not compete for much longer and was dissolved in 2009.

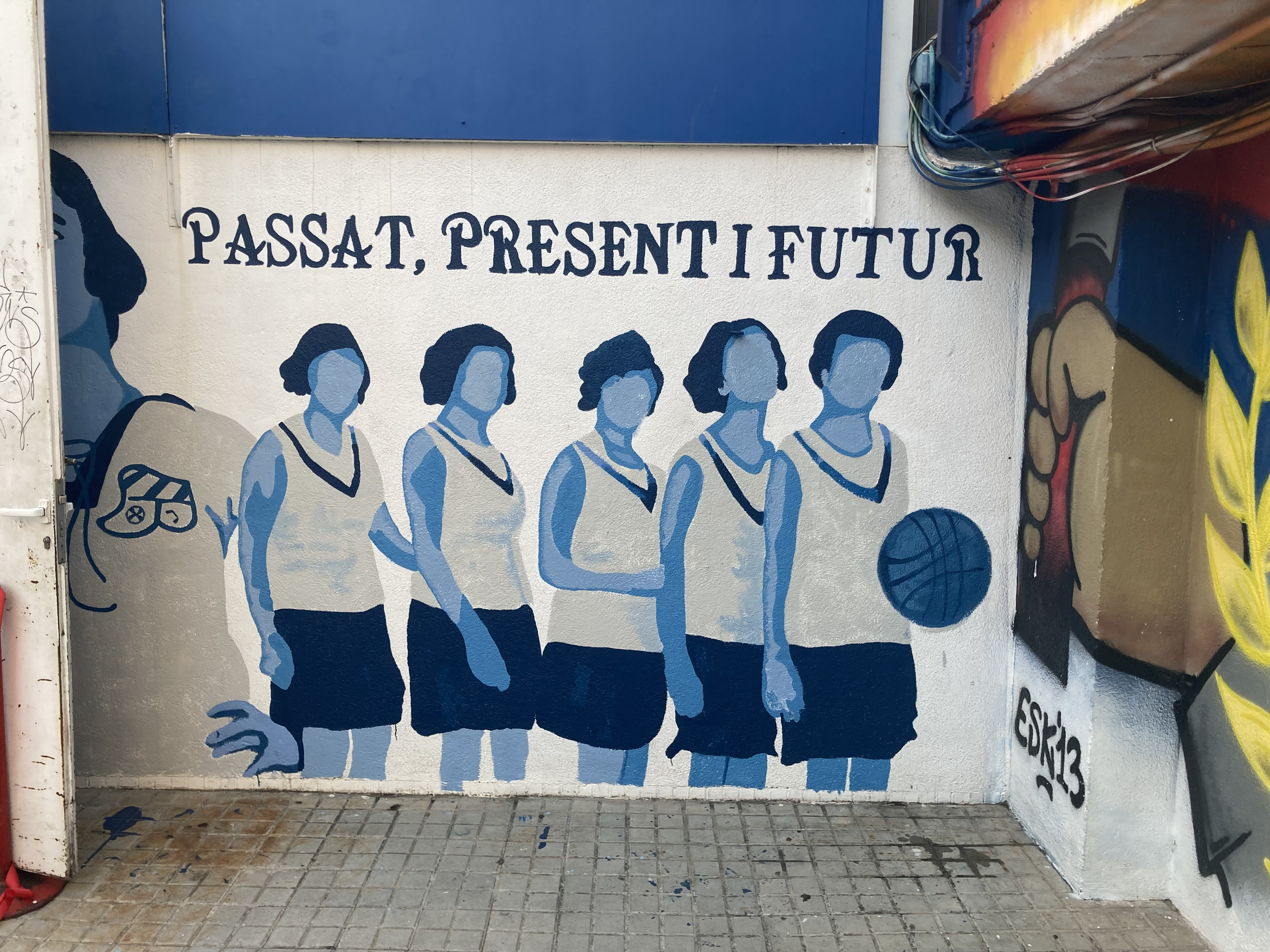
A tribute in the form of a mural to women playing basketball at CE Europa, based on a picture from 1929, in the Nou Sardenya.

== Women's team ==
During the celebration of the 1929 Barcelona International Exposition, CE Europa formed a women's team that would participate in a tournament within the exposition.

Its players were Maria Lluïsa Doallo, Dolors Martínez, Maria Navarro, Josefa Roca, and Àngela Martínez. They won their first game by 18–0 against Tiberghien, but finished the tournament in third place.

There is no evidence of the dispute of more matches of CE Europa's women's basketball team after the finalization of the exposition in 1930.

== Season to season ==
=== Trajectory in the Catalan basketball championship ===
- 1923: Catalan Championship: -
- 1924: Catalan Championship: 1st
- 1925: Catalan Championship: 2nd
- 1926: Catalan Championship: 1st
- 1927: Catalan Championship: 3rd
- 1928: Catalan Championship: 4th
- 1929: Catalan Championship: 6th
- 1930: Catalan Championship: 5th
- 1931: Catalan Championship: 3rd

=== Trophies ===
- Catalan basketball championship (2): 1924 and 1926

== Legacy ==
One hundred years after the creation of the basketball section of CE Europa and the historic game against Laietà BC, the history of the basketball section was commemorated in 2022 with a documentary and a book.

== See also ==
- CE Europa
- Sport in Catalonia

== Bibliography ==
- Borchers, Liam (2024). The Story of Europa: A Unique Football Club from Catalonia. Groningen: Self-published. ISBN 978-9-0903-8388-0.
- Vergés i Soler, Ramon (2009). Història d'un històric: CE Europa (1907–2007) [History of an historic club: CE Europa (1907–2007)] (in Catalan). Barcelona: Club Esportiu Europa and Municipality of Barcelona. ISBN 978-84-9850-163-6. DL B-21.803.2009.
- Vidal i Buyé, Xavier (2022). Bàsquet, 100 anys [Basketball, 100 years] (PDF) (in Catalan). Club Esportiu Europa.
