= Vila de Gràcia Trophy =

Football tournament in Barcelona, Catalonia

Vila de Gràcia Trophy Trofeu Vila de Gràcia
- Organiser(s): CE Europa
- Founded: 1995; 31 years ago
- Region: Vila de Gràcia, Barcelona, Catalonia
- Teams: CE Europa and an invited team
- Most championships: CE Europa (12)
- Website: https://www.ceeuropa.cat/

The Vila de Gràcia Trophy (Catalan: Trofeu Vila de Gràcia), officially the Trofeu Vila de Gràcia Memorial Carles Capella, is an annual summer friendly football tournament in the Vila de Gràcia, Barcelona (Catalonia, Spain).

== History ==
In 1995, the tournament was first organised to celebrate the reopening of the Nou Sardenya after three years of remodeling.

Since that year, the tournament has been disputed every year, except for the editions in 2014 and 2022 (due to constructions in the stadium) and 2020 (due to the COVID-19 pandemic).

In 2023, it was announced that the tournament was renamed Trofeu Vila de Gràcia Memorial Carles Capella, paying tribute to Carles Capella Amills, a former player of CE Europa.

== Tradition ==
The tournament is usually held on 15 August, coinciding with the Festa Major de Gràcia, and in the Nou Sardenya, the home stadium of the organising Catalan football club CE Europa.

The tournament serves as the official presentation of the first men's team of CE Europa and consists of a single match against an invited team.

In some editions, the tournament consisted of three matches, before adopting a single-match format.

== Editions ==
Edition	Year	Champion	Result	Runner-up
1st	1995	UE Lleida	1–0	CE Europa
2nd	1996	CE Europa	3–2	CE L'Hospitalet
3rd	1997	Terrassa FC	2–1	CE Europa
4th	1998	UDA Gramenet	1–0	CE Europa
5th	1999	Real Zaragoza B	2–1	CE Europa
6th	2000	CE Europa	5–0	CE Premià
7th	2001	RCD Espanyol B	3–1	CE Europa
8th	2002	CE Europa	2–1	Gimnàstic de Tarragona
9th	2003	CE Europa	3–2	RCD Espanyol B
10th	2004	CE Europa	3–0	FC Barcelona B
11th	2005	CE Europa	2–0	CE Sabadell
12th	2006	Girona FC	3–1	CE Europa
13th	2007	FC Barcelona B	3–1	CE Europa
14th	2008	UDA Gramenet	2–0	CE Europa
15th	2009	CE Sabadell	1–0	CE Europa
16th	2010	CE Europa	2–0	FC Santboià
17th	2011	UE Sant Andreu	0–0 (pp)	CE Europa
18th	2012	RCD Espanyol B	0–0 (pp)	CE Europa
19th	2013	CE Europa	1–0	UE Olot
2014 Not disputed due to constructions in the Nou Sardenya
20th	2015	UE Cornellà	1–0	CE Europa
21st	2016	CE Europa	2–0	UE Cornellà
22nd	2017	Terrassa FC	2–2	CE Europa
23rd	2018	CE Europa	1–1 (pp)	Lleida Esportiu
24th	2019	CE Europa	1–0	AE Prat
2020 Not disputed due to the COVID-19 pandemic
25th	2021	RCD Espanyol B	2–1	CE Europa
2022 Not disputed due to the installation of a new field in the Nou Sardenya
26th	2023	Terrassa FC	3–0	CE Europa
27th	2024	CE Europa	4–2	CE L'Hospitalet

(pp): decided after penalties

== Titles by club ==
- With 12 titles: CE Europa
- With 3 titles: RCD Espanyol B i Terrassa FC
- With 2 titles: UDA Gramenet
- With 1 title: UE Lleida, Real Zaragoza B, Girona FC, FC Barcelona B, CE Sabadell, UE Sant Andreu i UE Cornellà

== See also ==
- Vila de Gràcia Trophy (women)

== Sources ==
- Borchers, Liam (2024). The Story of Europa: A Unique Football Club from Catalonia. Groningen: Self-published. ISBN 978-9-0903-8388-0.
- Vergés i Soler, Ramon (2009). Història d'un històric: CE Europa (1907–2007) [History of an historic club: CE Europa (1907–2007)] (in Catalan). Barcelona: Club Esportiu Europa and Municipality of Barcelona. ISBN 978-84-9850-163-6. DL B-21.803.2009.
