= CE Europa (women) =

CE Europa (women) CE Europa femení (in Catalan)
- Full name: Club Esportiu Europa (women); Club Esportiu Europa femení (in Catalan)
- Nicknames: Escapulades; Europeistes; Gracienques
- Founded: 2001
- Ground: Nou Sardenya; Barcelona, Catalonia; Spain
- Capacity: 4,000
- Chairman: (Spain) Hèctor Ibar
- Manager: (Spain) Nany Haces
- League: Segunda Federación (women)
- 2023-24: Primera Federación (women), 12th
- Website: http://www.ceeuropa.cat/
Home colours	Away colours	Third colours

Club Esportiu Europa is the women's football section of CE Europa, a Catalan football club based in the city of Barcelona, with close links to the Vila de Gràcia. Founded in 2001, its first team currently plays in the Primera Federación, the second tier of Spanish football. Moreover, it disposes of 10 other women's teams as of the 2024–25 season, including both senior teams and youth teams. The first team plays its home matches at the Nou Sardenya, with a capacity for 4,000 spectators.

During most of its history, Europa's first team competed in the second division of Spanish women's football.

Moreover, CE Europa is considered one of the pioneers of women's football in Catalonia because of its high number of teams, the equality of treatment of its women's and men's sections, the measures that the club undertakes to promote women's football, and the attention the women's teams receive by its supporters.

== History ==
Even though the history of CE Europa goes back to 1907, its women's section was only founded in 2001 after absorbing the squad of UE Taxonera.

In only three seasons, the team reached the Segunda División, the then-second tier of women's football. The club spent eight seasons in that division, before being relegated in 2012 to the third tier.

Europa returned to the second tier one year later, often finishing in the middle of the table. In 2019, the team suffered relegation again, which were followed by many changes in the structure of Spanish women's football. This impeded CE Europa to achieve promotion in 2022, despite finishing in first place.

In 2022-23, Europa did achieve promotion to the second tier, renamed the Primera Federación, after four years of absence. One year later, the club got relegated back to the third division, but in 2024-25, the escapulades returned to the second level.

Another substantial change in the history of Europa's women's section in the 2020s were the increase of the number of teams, the increase of the financial compensation of the first team, the improved facilities at the club, and the increase of attendance numbers at the matches of the first team.

== Stadium ==
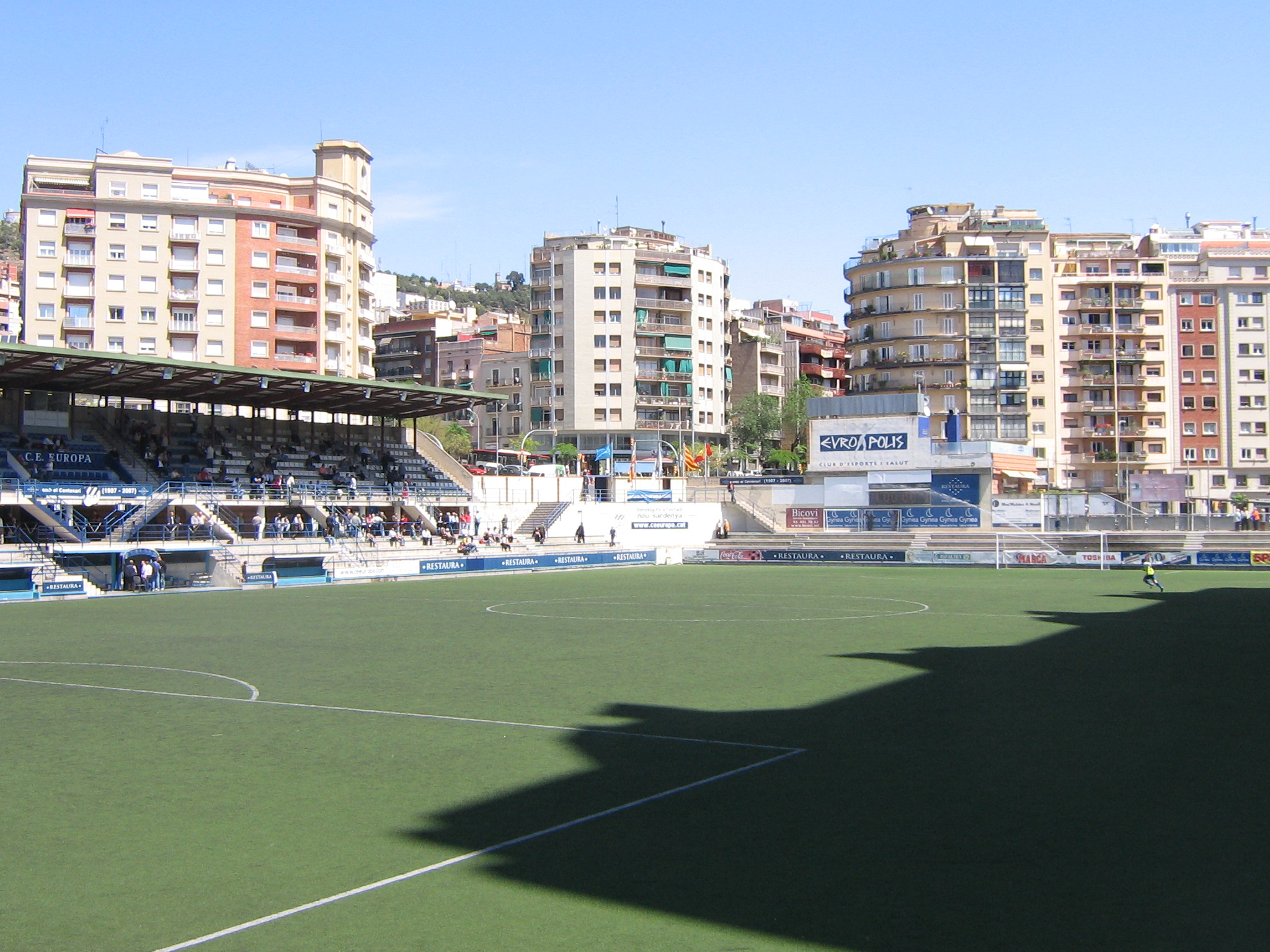
The Nou Sardenya

=== Nou Sardenya ===
CE Europa holds its home games at Nou Sardenya, with a 4,000-spectator capacity, opened on 1 December 1940 and located in the Vila de Gràcia, Barcelona. The stadium has artificial grass and dimensions of 100x63 meters.

=== Camp de l'Àliga ===
The Camp de l'Àliga is CE Europa's second stadium, in which many youth teams play. The stadium is located in the neighbourhood of Vallcarca i els Penitents, Barcelona, and has artificial grass.

== Honours ==
=== Official titles ===
- Segunda Federación
  - Winners (1): 2024–25
- Primera División Nacional
  - Winners (1): 2021–22
- Regional
  - Winners (2): 2002–03, 2012–13

=== Friendly titles ===
- Vila de Gràcia Trophy
  - Winners (6) 2003, 2006, 2009, 2013, 2018, 2019

== Season to season ==
Season	Tier	Division	Place
2001/02	5	3ª Cat.	2nd
2002/03	4	2ª Cat.	1st
2003/04	3	1ª Cat.	2nd
2004/05	2	2ª Div.	9th
2005/06	2	2ª Div.	10th
2006/07	2	2ª Div.	9th
2007/08	2	2ª Div.	9th
2008/09	2	2ª Div.	11th
2009/10	2	2ª Div.	8th
2010/11	2	2ª Div.	7th
2011/12	2	2ª Div.	12th
2012/13	3	Pref.	1st

Season	Tier	Division	Place
2013/14	2	2ª Div.	4th
2014/15	2	2ª Div.	6th
2015/16	2	2ª Div.	5th
2016/17	2	2ª Div.	4th
2017/18	2	2ª Div.	6th
2018/19	2	2ª Div.	9th
2019/20	3	2ª Div.	5th
2020/21	3	2ª Div.	4th
2021/22	3	2ª Div.	1st
2022/23	3	2ª Fed.	2nd
2023/24	2	1ª Ref.	12th
2024/25	3	2ª Fed.	1st

== Current squad ==
Last updated on 22 June 2013. Note: Flags indicate national team as defined under FIFA eligibility rules; some limited exceptions apply. Players may hold more than one non-FIFA nationality.

No.	Pos.	Nation	Player
1	GK	ESP	Sandra Noria
2	DF	JPN	Megumi Kozakai
3	MF	ESP	Irene Gisbert
4	DF	ESP	Carla Hernández
5	MF	ESP	Ana Castellano
6	DF	ESP	Sandra Teixidó (1st captain)
7	MF	ESP	Sandra Guiu
8	MF	ESP	Llorença Gasull (4th captain)
10	MF	ESP	Vane Obis (2nd captain)
11	FW	ESP	Laia Sangorrín
14	DF	HON	Eybis Medina

No.	Pos.	Nation	Player
15	DF	ESP	Alba Montoro (3rd captain)
17	MF	ESP	Ana Alcocer
19	FW	ESP	Marina Batalla
21	FW	ESP	Núria Becerra
22	FW	ESP	Clara Clemente
23	DF	ESP	Iris Sánchez
25	GK	ESP	Tania Macías
--	DF	ESP	Marta Pou
--	DF	ESP	Tania Álvarez
--	MF	ESP	Pili Porta
--	FW	ESP	Anna Sitjà

=== Staff ===
Position	Staff
Head coach	(Spain) Nany Haces
Assistant coach	(Spain) Lucía Martínez
Analist	(Spain) Víctor Ramírez
Technical assistant	(Spain) Yannick Llaugé
Goalkeeper coach	(Spain) Adri Freire
Physiotherapist	(Spain) Alex Campos
Fitness coach	(Spain) Gina Casals
Nutritionist	(Spain) Maria Abad

== List of coaches ==
- Pere Herrera (2001-2004)
- Lluís Garcia Mur (2004-2006)
- Siscu Pujol (2006-2009)
- Natalia Astrain (2009-2010)
- Siscu Pujol (2010-2011)
- Fredi Martín (2011-2012)
- Carlos Navas (2012-2014)
- Oriol Casadevall (2014)
- Carlos Navas (2014-2015)
- Álvaro del Blanco (2015-2017)
- Cristian Aleza (2017-2018)
- Toni Camacho (2018-2019)
- Fran Güells (2019-2021)
- Joan Bacardit (2021-2024)
- Nany Haces (2024-present)

== Base football ==
Immediately after the creation of the women's team, the Club built the base structure. The subsidiary team was created (season 2002-03) and then the children's football 7 (2003-04) and finally the cadet team (2004-05). The base football has been maintained until today with some later modifications, and has come to consist of nine different teams.

== Second team ==
After the creation of the 2002-03 season, the second team disappeared after a few years. In 2022 it was reconstituted and since then it has won several league championships and consecutive promotions until reaching Tercera Federación, fourth level of the Spanish women's league.

=== Season to season ===
Season	Tier	Division	Place
2022/23	7	2ª catalana	1st
2023/24	6	1ª catalana	1st
2024/25	5	Preferent	6th
2025/26	4	3ª Fed.	--

== Vila de Gràcia Trophy ==
The Vila de Gràcia Trophy, officially and in Catalan the Trofeu Vila de Gràcia Memorial Fina Serrano, is an annual pre-season tournament organised by CE Europa. It serves as the presentation of the first women's team of the club and includes the invitation a new team each year. In its first years, it was known as the Torneig Caliu Gracienc, as it was organised by the homonymous supporter group.

== Bibliography ==
- Borchers, Liam (2024). The Story of Europa: A Unique Football Club from Catalonia. Groningen: Self-published. ISBN 978-9-0903-8388-0.
- Vergés i Soler, Ramon (2009). Història d'un històric: CE Europa (1907–2007) [History of an historic club: CE Europa (1907–2007)] (in Catalan). Barcelona: Club Esportiu Europa and Municipality of Barcelona. ISBN 978-84-9850-163-6. DL B-21.803.2009.
