= Vila de Gràcia Trophy (women) =

Football tournament in Barcelona, Catalonia

Vila de Gràcia Trophy Trofeu Vila de Gràcia
- Organiser(s): CE Europa
- Founded: 2003; 23 years ago
- Region: Vila de Gràcia, Barcelona, Catalonia
- Teams: CE Europa (women) and an invited team
- Most championships: CE Europa (6)
- Website: https://www.ceeuropa.cat/

The Vila de Gràcia Trophy (Catalan: Trofeu Vila de Gràcia), officially the Trofeu Vila de Gràcia Memorial Fina Serrano, is an annual pre-season football tournament in the Vila de Gràcia, Barcelona (Catalonia, Spain).

== History ==
From 2003 to 2013 the tournament was called Torneig Caliu Gracienc, given that it was organised by the supporter group with the same name.

In 2023 it was announced that the tournament would honour Fina Serrano Gallardo, an ex-player of CE Europa and a pioneer of women's football in Catalonia.

== Format ==
The tournament is organized by the Catalan football club CE Europa, played in the Nou Sardenya, and disputed between the women's team of CE Europa and an invited team.

Moreover, it serves as the official presentation of CE Europa's first women's team.

== Editions ==
Edition	Year	Champion	Result	Runner-up
Organised as Torneig Caliu Gracienc
1st	2003	CE Europa	1–0	FC Barcelona B
2nd	2004	CE Sant Gabriel	2–0	CE Europa
3rd	2005	CE Sant Gabriel	2–1	CE Europa
4th	2006	CE Europa	3–1	FC Barcelona B
5th	2007	UE Lleida	3–0	CE Europa
6th	2008	CD Blanes	2–2 (pp)	CE Europa
7th	2009	CE Europa	6–0	Unificació Bellvitge
8th	2010	RCD Espanyol B	3–2	CE Europa
9th	2011	FC Barcelona B	3–1	CE Europa
10th	2012	UE Sant Andreu	1–1 (pp)	CE Europa
11th	2013	CE Europa	5–1	EF Bonaire
2014 – 2016 Was not organised
Organised as Trofeu Vila de Gràcia
12th	2017	CE Seagull	2–1	CE Europa
13th	2018	CE Europa	4–2	FC Barcelona B
14th	2019	CE Europa	5–2	RCD Espanyol B
2020 Not organised because of the COVID-19 pandemic
15th	2021	AEM Lleida	3–1	CE Europa
2022 Not organised because of the installation of a new field in the Nou Sardenya
16th	2023	Villarreal CF	4–2	CE Europa
17th	2024	CD Atlético Baleares	2–2 (pp)	CE Europa

(pp): winner after penalties

== Titles by club ==
- 6 trophies: CE Europa
- 2 trophies: CE Sant Gabriel
- 1 trophy: UE Lleida, CD Blanes, RCD Espanyol B, FC Barcelona B, UE Sant Andreu, CE Seagull, AEM Lleida, Villarreal CF, CD Atlético Baleares

== See also ==
- Vila de Gràcia Trophy

== Sources ==
- Borchers, Liam (2024). The Story of Europa: A Unique Football Club from Catalonia. Groningen: Self-published. ISBN 978-9-0903-8388-0.
- Vergés i Soler, Ramon (2009). Història d'un històric: CE Europa (1907–2007) [History of an historic club: CE Europa (1907–2007)] (in Catalan). Barcelona: Club Esportiu Europa and Municipality of Barcelona. ISBN 978-84-9850-163-6. DL B-21.803.2009.
