= Arnau Campeny =

Spanish footballer

Personal information
- Full name: Arnau Campeny Gorchs
- Date of birth: 2 January 1997 (age 29)
- Place of birth: Arenys de Mar, Spain
- Height: 1.81 m (5 ft 11 in)
- Positions: Centre-back; right-back

Team information
- Current team: Europa
- Number: 5

Youth career
- Damm
- 2015–2016: Barcelona

Senior career*
Years	Team	Apps	(Gls)
2016–2017	Deportivo B	27	(0)
2017–2018	Llagostera B	19	(1)
2018	Llagostera	3	(0)
2018–2020	Horta	44	(0)
2020–2021	Granollers	22	(0)
2021–	Europa	131	(3)

International career^{‡}
2025–	Catalonia	1	(0)
- * Club domestic league appearances and goals as of 25 May 2026 ‡ National team caps and goals as of 18 November 2025

Arnau Campeny Gorchs (born 2 January 1997) is a Spanish professional footballer who plays as either a centre-back or a right-back for CE Europa.

== Club career ==
Born in Arenys de Mar, Barcelona, Catalonia, Campeny joined FC Barcelona's La Masia in 2015, from CF Damm. He left the former in July 2016, and subsequently signed for Deportivo de La Coruña's reserve team in Tercera División.

In 2017, Campeny moved to UE Llagostera, being initially a member of the B-team in Primera Catalana before being promoted to the main squad now also in the fourth division in August 2018. Rarely used, he agreed to a deal with fellow league team UA Horta in October of that year.

On 10 June 2020, Company joined EC Granollers still in division four. Regularly used, he signed for Segunda División RFEF side CE Europa on 13 July 2021.

== International career ==
On 17 November 2025, Campeny and Ilie Sánchez were called up to the Catalonia national team for a friendly against Palestine, after Arnau Martínez and Àlex Moreno both withdrew from the squad. He made his international debut the following day, playing the entire second half in the 2–1 win at the Estadi Olímpic Lluís Companys.
