= Luis Blanco (footballer, born 1978) =

Spanish football manager

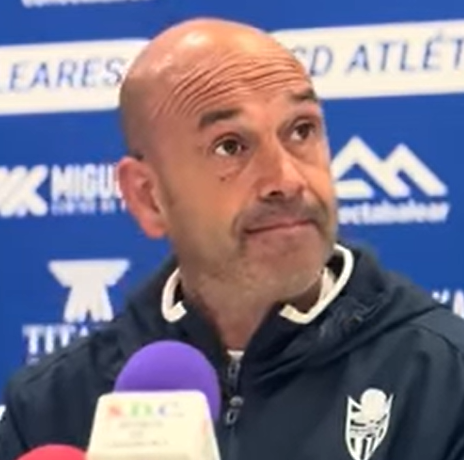
- Blanco in 2026

Personal information
- Full name: Luis Blanco Garrido
- Date of birth: 31 May 1978 (age 48)
- Place of birth: Santa Coloma de Gramenet, Spain
- Height: 1.75 m (5 ft 9 in)
- Position: Winger

Team information
- Current team: Europa (manager)

Youth career
- Gramenet

Senior career*
Years	Team	Apps	(Gls)
1995–1998	Gramenet	25	(7)
1998–2001	Espanyol B	47	(5)
1999	Espanyol	0	(0)
2001–2003	Gramenet	31	(2)
2003–2010	Badalona	190	(20)
2010–2012	Sant Andreu	63	(6)
Total		356	(40)

Managerial career
- 2013–2014: Badalona (assistant)
- 2014–2017: Espanyol B (assistant)
- 2017–2021: Espanyol (youth)
- 2021–2023: Espanyol B
- 2022: Espanyol (interim)
- 2024: Espanyol (assistant)
- 2025–2026: Atlético Baleares
- 2026–: Europa
- * Club domestic league appearances and goals

Luis Blanco Garrido (born 31 May 1978) is a Spanish football manager and former player who played mainly as a right winger. Since September 2026 manages Primera Federación club CE Europa.

== Playing career ==
Born in Santa Coloma de Gramenet, Barcelona, Catalonia, Blanco was an UDA Gramenet youth graduate, and made his first team debut at the age of just 16 on 21 May 1995, coming on as a second-half substitute in a 1–1 Segunda División B home draw against Real Murcia. In the 1997–98 season, aged 19, he was already a regular starter for the side.

In 1998, Blanco moved to RCD Espanyol and was initially assigned to the reserves also in the third division. He made his first team debut on 17 July 1999, playing the last 17 minutes of a 0–2 home loss against Montpellier HSC, for the year's UEFA Intertoto Cup.

In 2001, Blanco returned to Gramenet, but left the club in January 2003 after featuring rarely during the season, and joined Tercera División side CF Badalona. In May 2010, after one promotion to the third division in the 2003–04 campaign, he left.

Blanco agreed to a deal with third division side UE Sant Andreu in July 2010, He featured regularly with the side before retiring in 2012, aged 34.

== Managerial career ==
On 11 June 2013, Blanco was named Piti Belmonte's assistant at his former side Badalona. On 24 June 2014, he returned to another club he represented as a player, Espanyol, being appointed assistant of Lluís Planagumà at the B-team.

In 2017, Blanco was named manager of Espanyol's Juvenil A side. He was in charge of the Juvenil B team during the 2018–19 campaign before subsequently returning to the Juvenil A in 2019, and then taking over the B's on 24 March 2021, after José Aurelio Gay was sacked.

On 13 May 2022, Blanco was named interim manager of the first team, after Vicente Moreno was sacked. His first professional – and La Liga – match in charge of the Pericos occurred the following day, a 1–1 home draw against Valencia CF.

== Managerial statistics ==
As of 8 November 2026

Managerial record by team and tenure
Team	Nat	From	To	Record								Ref
Team	Nat	From	To	G	W	D	L	GF	GA	GD	Win %	Ref
Espanyol B	(Spain)	24 March 2021	12 June 2023	78	36	19	23	105	92	+13	46.15	
Espanyol (interim)	(Spain)	13 May 2022	31 May 2022	2	0	2	0	1	1	+0	0.00	
Atlético Baleares	(Spain)	11 February 2025	10 June 2026	55	30	15	10	87	54	+33	54.55	
Europa	(Spain)	21 September 2026	Present	8	4	0	4	10	13	−3	50.00	
Total				143	70	36	37	203	160	+43	48.95	—
