= Catalan basketball championship =

The Catalan basketball championship (Campionat de Catalunya) was a basketball competition in Catalonia and the first basketball league in Spain before the Liga Nacional was established in 1957.

The championship was used as a qualifier for the Copa del Rey.

== History ==
Year	Champion	Runner-up
1923	Societé Patrie	Barcelona
1924	Europa	Martinenc
1925	Martinenc	Europa
1926	Europa	
1927	Martinenc	Gràcia
1928	Laietà	FC Barcelona
1929	Laietà	Societé Patrie
1930	Societé Patrie	Laietà
1931	Espanyol	Juventus
1932	Espanyol	Juventus
1933	Juventus	Iluro
1934	Iluro	Laietà
1935	Societé Patrie	Laietà
1936	Societé Patrie	Juniors
No competition between 1937 and 1939
1940	L'Hospitalet	Athlètic
1941	L'Hospitalet	Espanyol

Year	Champion	Runner-up
1942	FC Barcelona	Layetano
1943	FC Barcelona	Español
1944	Layetano	
1945	FC Barcelona	Layetano
1946	FC Barcelona	Layetano
1947	FC Barcelona	
1948	FC Barcelona	Juventud Badalona
1949	Juventud Badalona	FC Barcelona
1950	FC Barcelona	Juventud Badalona
1951	FC Barcelona	Juventud Badalona
1952	Juventud Badalona	Sant Josep
1953	Juventud Badalona	FC Barcelona
1954	Juventud Badalona	Español
1955	FC Barcelona	Juventud Badalona
1956	Aismalíbar	Juventud Badalona
1957	Juventud Badalona	Aismalíbar

== Titles by team ==
Team	Winners	Runners-up	Years winner
FC Barcelona	9	3	1942, 1943, 1945, 1946, 1947, 1948, 1950, 1951, 1955
Joventut Badalona	5	5	1949, 1952, 1953, 1954, 1957
Societé Patrie	4	1	1923, 1930, 1935, 1936
Laietà	3	6	1928, 1929, 1944
Espanyol	2	3	1931, 1932
Europa	2	1	1924, 1926
Martinenc	2	1	1925, 1927
L'Hospitalet	2	0	1940, 1941
Juventus	1	2	1933
Iluro	1	1	1934
Aismalíbar	1	1	1956
