= Camp Municipal Narcís Sala =

Football stadium in Barcelona, Spain

Narcís Sala
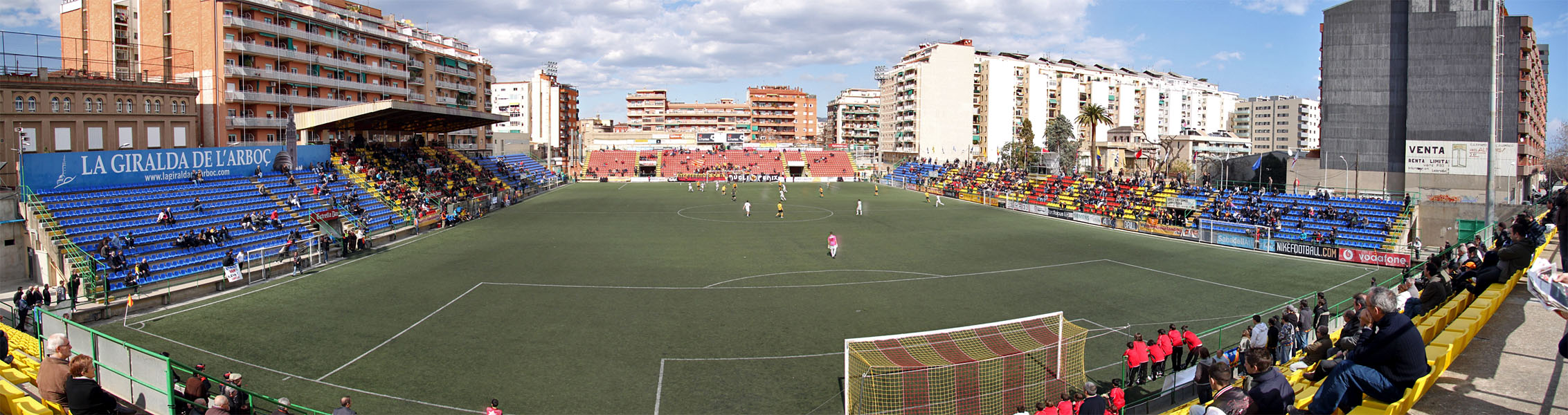
- Interactive map of Narcís Sala
- Full name: Camp Municipal Narcís Sala
- Location: Barcelona, Spain
- Coordinates: 41°25′43.81″N 2°11′34.97″E
- Capacity: 6,563
- Surface: Artificial
- Field size: 105 x 64 m

Construction
- Opened: March 19, 1970

Tenant
- UE Sant Andreu (1970–present)

Camp Municipal Narcís Sala (Catalan pronunciation: [ˈkam munisiˈpal nəɾˈsis ˈsalə]) is a football stadium in Barcelona, Catalonia, Spain. It is the home of the team UE Sant Andreu. Following work in late 2010, the stadium now has an all-seater capacity for 6,563 spectators.

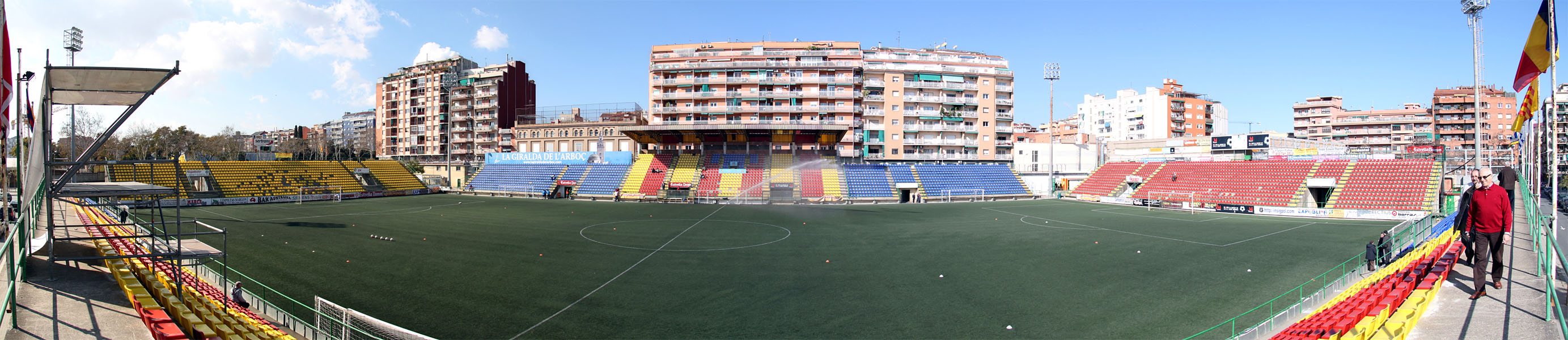
Panoramic view of the stadium after the renovation
