= Laietà BC =

Club Esportiu Laietà
- Founded: 1922
- History: Laietà BC (1922–1939); CD Layetano (1939–1977); CE Laietà (1967–present)
- Location: Barcelona, Catalonia
- Team colors: White and blue
- Championships: 2 Copa del Rey
- Website: laieta.es
Home	Away	Third

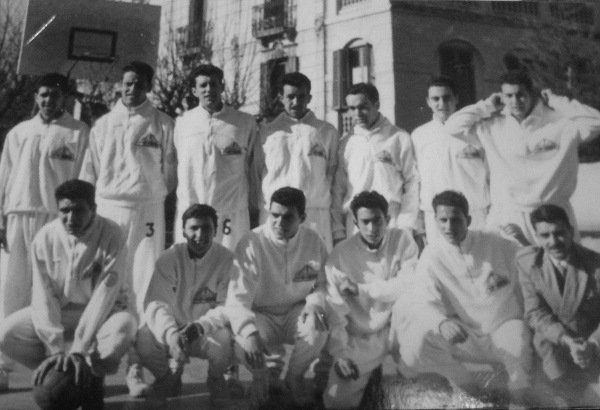

Laietà Basket Club, nowadays known as Club Esportiu Laietà was the first basketball club founded in Spain.

== History ==
It was founded in Barcelona in 1922 by a group of former students of the "Pious Schools of San Antón" of Barcelona, the school where Father Eusebio Millán introduced the sport of basketball in Spain in 1921. Laietà, wearing a white shirt with a blue stripe diagonal, organized the first basketball game held in Spain: it was in Barcelona on December 8, 1922, and CE Europa defeated Laietà by 8-2 in the field of CE Europa, in the district of Gràcia. The members of that first team of Laietà (Nogues, Mach, Pardiñas, Ferrer Aragones, Mons and Sanuy) trained three days a week at six o'clock before going to work.

Laietà, during the years of Francoist Spain, translated its official name to Spanish becoming "Club de Baloncesto Layetano".Layetano was one of the reference Catalan sports clubs for decades.

The club played four consecutive finals of the Cup of Spain, between 1942 and 1945, being claimed twice champion in 1942 and 1944, after defeating in the final FC Barcelona and Real Madrid, respectively. The 1943 and 1945 finals were lost against FC Barcelona.

The decline of Laietà Basket Club began in 1947. The Spanish basketball began to become professional and their best players signed with other clubs offering them jobs or financial compensation. In 1948 there were only three players in the team and the club asked for a year's leave to the Catalan Federation to rebuild the team. After a year without participating in competitions Laietà returned to competition, but with other objectives focused on the training of young players. FC Barcelona, with several former players from Laietà, started to dominate Catalan basketball.

In 1957 Laietà did not participate in the first Spanish basketball league, but it was invited to join one year later when the league expanded to ten teams. It played one season in the first division but it ended with relegation. In 1962 Laietà finished as champion of the Second Division and came back up to the top league led by Agustí Bertomeu. One year later, the club was again relegated.

The club was on the verge of disappearing in 1964 when it was evicted from its historical playing venue, opened in 1932, and located at the confluence of the Viladomat and Rosselló street, in the Eixample in Barcelona. Stop Mañanet school helped the club for three years hosting the basketball and hockey, and Pompeia Tennis Club supported his tennis section.

In 1967 the club was renamed Club Esportiu Laietà, released extensive facilities in the Pintor Ribalta district of Les Corts, very close to the facilities of FC Barcelona. Currently the club has 16 tennis clay courts, 6 paddle, 3 sports tracks and continues being active in basketball, but away from the highly competitive and focused on the training of young players.

== Honours & achievements ==
Spanish Cup

- Winners (2): 1942, 1944
- Runners-up (2): 1943, 1945

Catalan League

- Winners (2): 1928, 1929
- Runners-up (6): 1930, 1934, 1935, 1942, 1945, 1946
