= El Baix Guinardó =

- Neighborhood
- Interactive map of El Baix Guinardó
- Country: Spain
- Autonomous community: Catalonia
- Province: Barcelona
- Comarca: Barcelonès
- Municipality: Barcelona
- District: Horta-Guinardó

Area
  - Total: 0.56 km^{2} (0.22 sq mi)

Population
  - Total: 25,563
  - Density: 46,000/km^{2} (120,000/sq mi)

El Baix Guinardó (Catalan pronunciation: [əl ˈβaʒ ɣinərˈdo]) is a neighborhood in the Horta-Guinardó district of Barcelona, Catalonia (Spain).
