= Camp d'en Grassot i Gràcia Nova =

Coordinates: 41°24′21.92″N 2°10′2.85″E

- Neighborhood of Barcelona
- Interactive map of Camp d'en Grassot i Gràcia Nova
- Country: Spain
- Autonomous community: Catalonia
- Province: Barcelona
- Comarca: Barcelonès
- Municipality: Barcelona
- District: Gràcia

Area
  - Total: 0.65 km^{2} (0.25 sq mi)

Population
  - Total: 34,275
  - Density: 53,000/km^{2} (140,000/sq mi)

El Camp d'en Grassot i Gràcia Nova (Catalan pronunciation: [ˈkam dəŋ ɡɾəˈsɔt i ˈɣɾasiə ˈnɔβə]) is a neighbourhood in the city of Barcelona, Catalonia, Spain.

It is part of the Gràcia district.

== Landmarks ==
The façade of the old silk factory (La Sedeta) remains as a reminder of an important economic activity from 1899 to 1976.

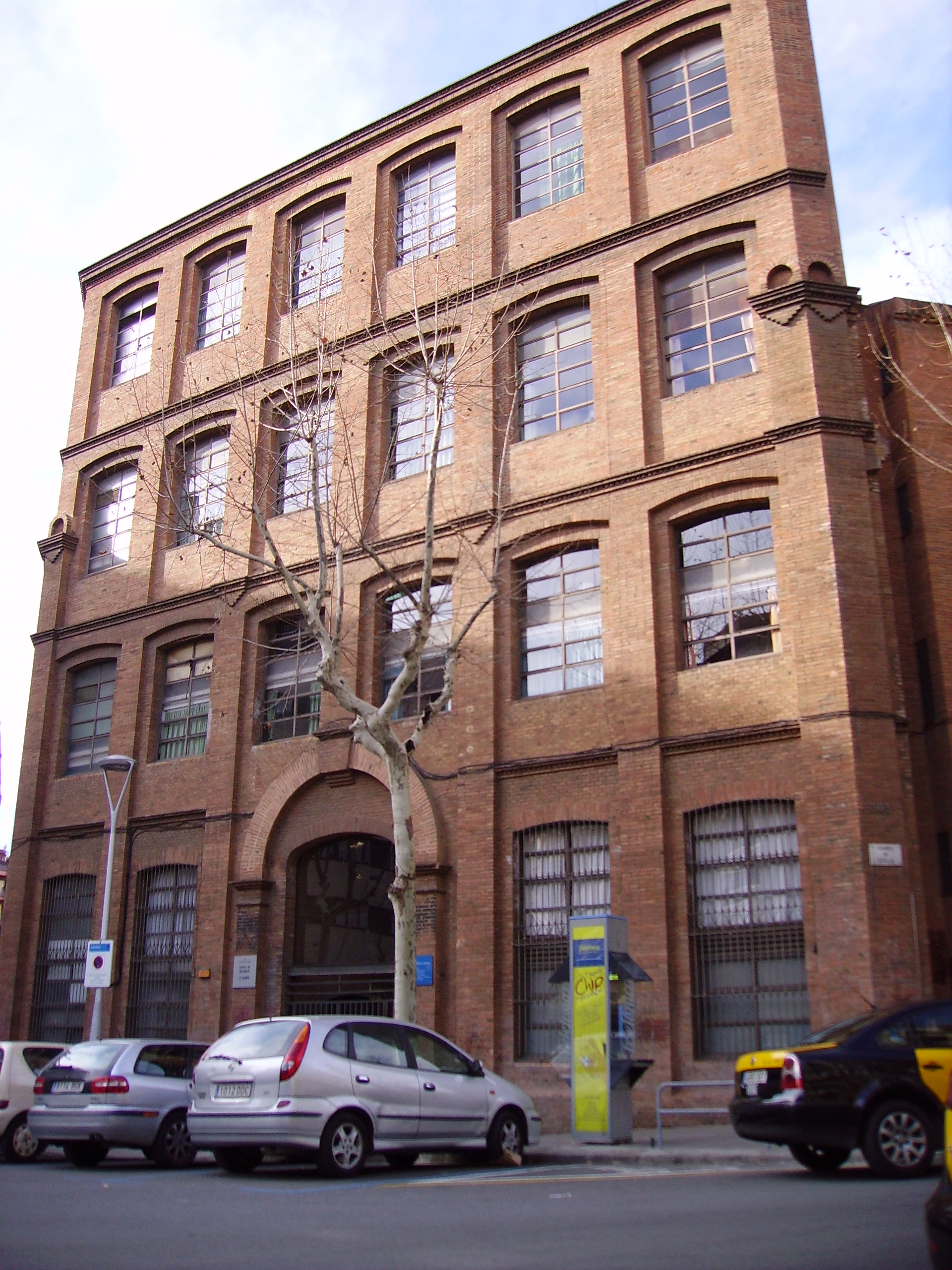
La Sedeta façade
