= Nou Sardenya =

Football stadium in Barcelona, Spain

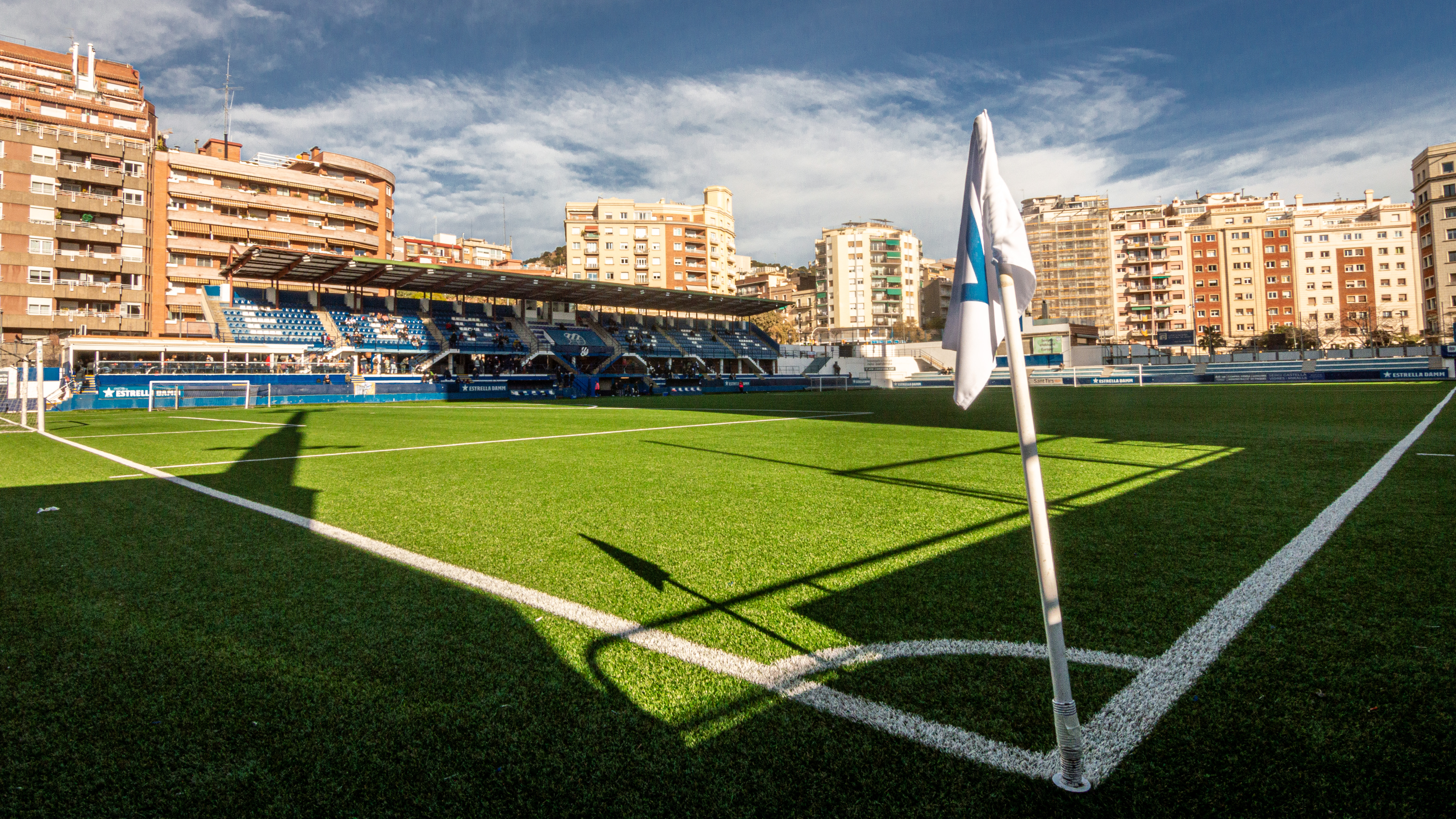
- Interactive map of Nou Sardenya
- Location: Barcelona, Catalonia, Spain
- Coordinates: 41.4118°N 2.1615°E
- Owner: Ajuntament de Barcelona
- Capacity: 4,000
- Record attendance: 4,032 (since rebuilding) (Europa vs Elche, 1 November 2023)
- Field size: 105 metres (115 yd) x 63 metres (69 yd)

Construction
- Opened: 4 December 1940 as Sardenya
- Renovated: 3 May 1995 as Nou Sardenya

Tenant
- CE Europa

Nou Sardenya is a municipally-owned football stadium in the Gràcia district of Barcelona, Catalonia, Spain. It is currently used mostly for football matches and is the home ground of CE Europa. The stadium holds about 4,000.
