= Vila de Gràcia =

Coordinates: 41°24′12″N 2°09′26″E

- Neighborhood of Barcelona
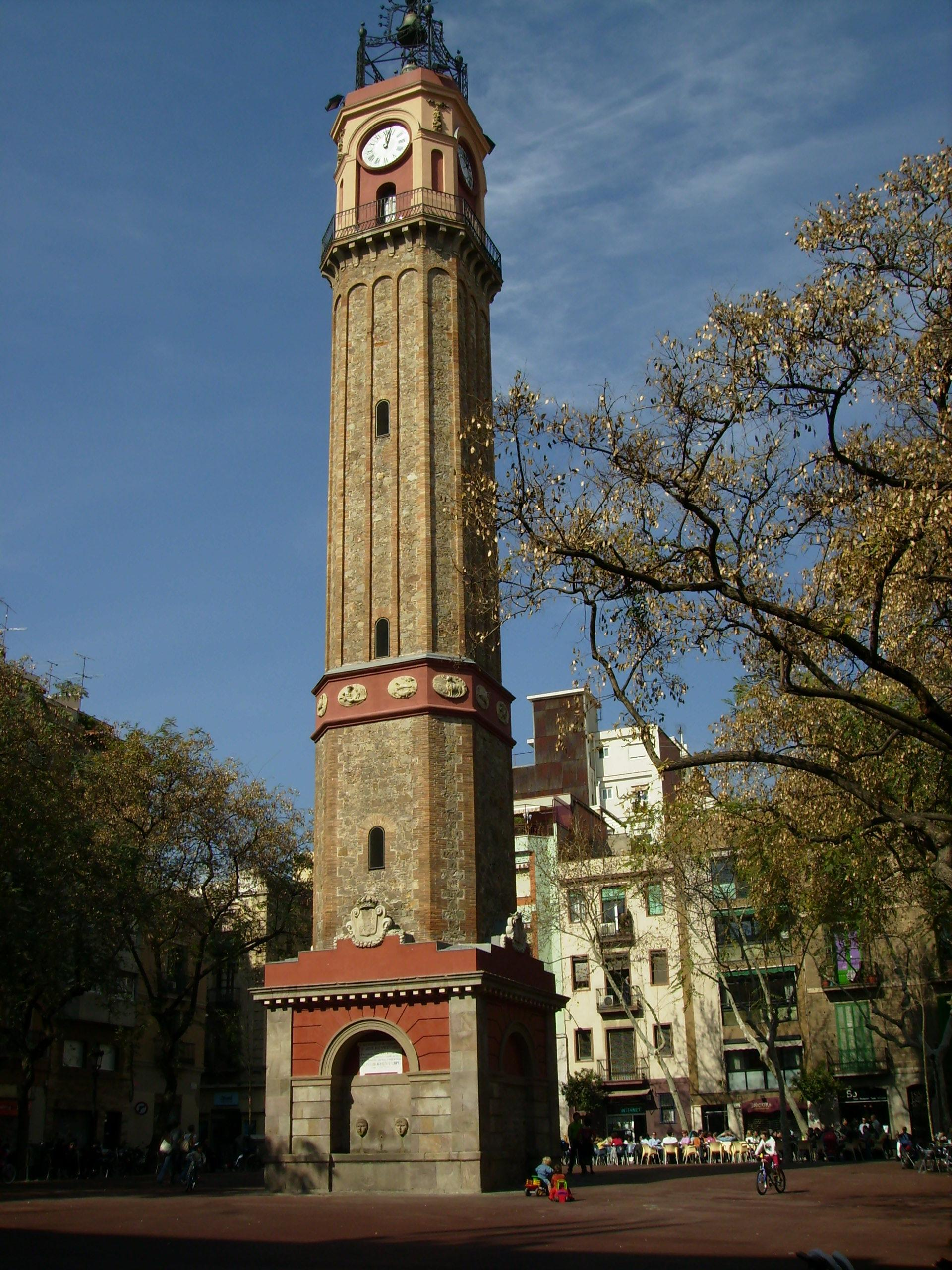
- Torre del rellotge (Clock Tower), located in the Plaça de la Vila de Gràcia
- Interactive map of Vila de Gràcia
- Country: Spain
- Autonomous community: Catalonia
- Province: Barcelona
- Comarca: Barcelonès
- Municipality: Barcelona
- District: Gràcia

Area
  - Total: 1.326 km^{2} (0.512 sq mi)

Population
  - Total: 50,670
  - Density: 38,210/km^{2} (98,970/sq mi)

Vila de Gràcia (Catalan pronunciation: [ˈbilə ðə ˈɣɾasi.ə], Spanish pronunciation: [ˈbila ðe ˈɣɾaθja]), which translates as town of Gràcia, or Gràcia, is a neighborhood in the Gràcia district of Barcelona, Catalonia (Spain). This neighborhood was the main core of the old town of Gràcia that included also Camp d'en Grassot i Gràcia Nova.

One of the things that characterize this neighborhood (old town) is its Festa Major (patron's festival). Its history dates back to the 19th century, when, during the patron saint's festivities, the Virgin of Gràcia was carried throughout the town. The citizens, to make the festival a little more fun, began to decorate the streets where the virgin passed. That continued with the annexation to Barcelona. Currently, the streets continue to be decorated, being both a local and tourist attraction. The streets are decorated, with a contest in between. During the Tourist go Home campaign of the citizens of Barcelona against the excess of tourists in Barcelona, they asked that this party be suspended, since, in their words, it was a cluster of tourists in a quiet neighborhood like Gràcia.
