= List of FC Barcelona Femení seasons =

This is a list of seasons played by FC Barcelona Femení, the women's section of football club FC Barcelona. It competes in the Spanish League from the Estadi Johan Cruyff in Sant Joan Despí, near Barcelona.

In the 1970s it competed as Penya Femenina Barcelona and from 1983 to 2002 it competed as Club Femení Barcelona.

== 1970–1980 ==
In 1971, following the success of an embryonic Barcelona women's team, an independent association for Catalan women's football was founded. It inaugurated a Catalan Cup and then the Catalan Championship league, both operated by sponsors, though the league was soon taken over by Educación y Descanso. A sponsor-operated National Championship league (which still featured mostly Catalan teams) began in 1974, after which formal leagues ceased for a few years. An Educación y Descanso affiliate resumed operating a Catalan women's league and cup in the later 1970s.

| Season | League | | | | | | | | | | Catalan Cup | Top scorer (Note: All goals scored in the league.) | |
| Season | Tier | Div | Pos | Pld | W | D | L | GF | GA | Pts | Catalan Cup | Name(s) | Goal |
|---|---|---|---|---|---|---|---|---|---|---|---|---|---|
| 1971–72 | 1 | CC | 4th | 26 | 17 | 6 | 3 | 94 | 14 | 40 | Runner-up | (Catalonia) Lolita Ortiz | 26 |
| 1973 | 1 | CC | 1st | 13 (Note: The team played 14 games, but only the results of 13 are known.) | 9 | 3 | 1 | 26 | 10 | 21 | | | |
| 1974 | 1 | CN | 6th (Note: Based on known results, as listed. The team was set to play 14 games, but only the results of 12 are known. They may have finished 4th.) | 12 | 3 | 3 | 6 | 11 | 21 | 9 | | | |
| 1975–76 | | | | | | | | | | | | | |
| 1977–78 | | | | | | | | | | | | | |
| 1978–79 | | | | | | | | | | | Runner-up (Note: P.F. Barcelona Atlètic) | | |
| 1979–80 | 1 | CF | 2nd (Note: Barcelona was second on 19 January 1980 and after this did not lose a game, while holding direct competitors to goalless draws. Only known results are shown here.) | 12 | 8 | 3 | 1 | 28 | 6 | 19 | | | |

== 1981–1988 ==
The Catalan Football Federation started the Catalan League in 1980, with the Copa Generalitat (a direct predecessor of the Copa Catalunya) as the Catalan national-level cup competition. In 1983, the Copa de la Reina was founded by the Royal Spanish Football Federation (RFEF) as the Spanish national-level cup competition. As the RFEF did not start a women's league until 1988, the champions of the Copa de la Reina were recognised as Spanish champions during this period; Barcelona did not participate.

Barcelona was a founding member of the Catalan League, but did not ever win it.

| Season | League (Note: Different formats of group phases were played in some seasons; for coherence of presentation, only the league and results of the final and/or overall phase that Barcelona competed in are included here.) | | | | | | | | | | Cup | Catalan Cup | Top scorer | |
| Season | Tier | Div | Pos | Pld | W | D | L | GF | GA | Pts | Cup | Catalan Cup | Name(s) | Goal |
|---|---|---|---|---|---|---|---|---|---|---|---|---|---|---|
| 1981 | 1 | LC | | | | | | | | | | | | |
| 1981–82 | | | | | | | | | | | | | | |
| 1982–83 | 1 | LC | | | | | | | | | | | | |
| 1983–84 | | | | | | | | | | | Withdrawn | Runner-up | | |
| 1984–85 | 1 | LC | 3rd | 10 | 4 | 3 | 3 | 23 | 22 | 11 | — | Champion | (Spain) Emilia Ibáñez | |
| 1985–86 | 1 | LC | 4th | 24 | 14 | 5 | 5 | 111 | 29 | 33 | — | Runner-up | (Spain) Emilia Ibàñez | 40 |
| 1986–87 | 1 | LC | 4th | 28 | 18 | 5 | 3 | 138 | 31 | 41 | — | Semifinals | | |
| 1987–88 | | LC | 4th | 14 | 8 | 1 | 5 | 36 | 15 | 17 | — | Round of 16 | | |

== 1988–present ==
The RFEF recognised women's football in 1980; it founded the official Spanish League system beginning in 1988.

| Season | League | | | | | | | | | | Cup | Supercup | Catalan Cup | UWCL | FWCC | Top scorer | |
| Season | Tier | Div | Pos | Pld | W | D | L | GF | GA | Pts | Cup | Supercup | Catalan Cup | UWCL | FWCC | Name(s) | Goal |
|---|---|---|---|---|---|---|---|---|---|---|---|---|---|---|---|---|---|
| 1988–89 | 1 | 1ª | 4th | 16 | 7 | 6 | 3 | 30 | 25 | 20 | Withdrawn | | Quarterfinals | | | | |
| 1989–90 | 1 | 1ª | 5th | 22 | 9 | 4 | 9 | 49 | 39 | 22 | Withdrawn | | | | | | |
| 1990–91 | 1 | 1ª | 6th | 14 | 5 | 1 | 8 | 23 | 39 | 11 | Runner-up | | | | | | |
| 1991–92 | 1 | 1ª | 2nd | 14 | 9 | 1 | 4 | 38 | 16 | 19 | Semifinals | | Champion | | | | |
| 1992–93 | 1 | 1ª | 3rd | 12 | 6 | 4 | 2 | 25 | 18 | 16 | Round of 32 | | | | | | |
| 1993–94 | 1 | 1ª | 3rd | 18 | 13 | 2 | 3 | 46 | 18 | 41 | Champion | | | | | | |
| 1994–95 | 1 | 1ª | 7th | 18 | 4 | 8 | 6 | 27 | 38 | 20 | Round of 32 | | Champion | | | | |
| 1995–96 | 1 | 1ª | 8th | 16 | 5 | 1 | 10 | 24 | 34 | 16 | Round of 16 | | | | | | |
| 1996–97 | 1 | 1ª | 4th (Gr:3) | 26 | 20 | 1 | 5 | 103 | 28 | 61 | — | — | | | | | |
| 1997–98 | 1 | 1ª | 2nd (Gr:3) | 26 | 20 | 3 | 2 | 137 | 25 | 63 | First round | — | | | | | |
| 1998–99 | 1 | 1ª | 5th (Gr:3) | 26 | 18 | 3 | 5 | 99 | 42 | 57 | — | — | | | | | |
| 1999–00 | 1 | 1ª | 6th (Gr:3) | 24 | 13 | 2 | 9 | 64 | 29 | 41 | — | — | Champion | | | | |
| 2000–01 | 1 | 1ª | 4th (Gr:3) | 26 | 17 | 3 | 6 | 96 | 40 | 54 | First round | | | | | | |
| 2001–02 | 2 | 2ª | 1st (Gr:III) | 26 | 23 | 3 | 0 | 123 | 6 | 72 | — | | | — | | | |
| 2002–03 | 2 | 2ª | 1st (Gr:III) | 26 | 22 | 4 | 0 | 138 | 19 | 70 | — | | | — | | | |
| 2003–04 | 2 | 2ª | 1st (Gr:III) | 26 | 23 | 2 | 1 | 101 | 17 | 71 | — | | | — | | | |
| 2004–05 | 1 | 1ª | 9th | 26 | 8 | 5 | 13 | 42 | 59 | 29 | — | | | — | | | |
| 2005–06 | 1 | 1ª | 8th | 24 | 8 | 4 | 12 | 39 | 51 | 28 | Quarterfinals | | Runner-up | — | | (Mexico) Patricia Pérez | 8 |
| 2006–07 | 1 | 1ª | 14th | 26 | 4 | 4 | 18 | 26 | 58 | 16 | — | | Runner-up | — | | (Spain) Marta Unzué | 6 |
| 2007–08 | 2 | 2ª | 1st (Gr:III) | 26 | 22 | 2 | 2 | 128 | 17 | 68 | — | | Runner-up | — | | | |
| 2008–09 | 1 | 1ª | 6th | 30 | 14 | 7 | 9 | 48 | 32 | 49 | Semifinals | | Runner-up | — | | (Spain) Mari Paz Vilas | 13 |
| 2009–10 | 1 | 1ª | 5th | 26 | 13 | 4 | 9 | 42 | 29 | 43 | Semifinals | | Champion | — | | (Spain) Marta Cubí | 13 |
| 2010–11 | 1 | 1ª | 4th | 28 | 15 | 5 | 8 | 53 | 26 | 50 | Champion | | Champion | — | | (Spain) Olga García | 16 |
| 2011–12 | 1 | 1ª | 1st | 34 | 31 | 1 | 2 | 119 | 19 | 94 | Semifinals | | Champion | — | | (Spain) Sonia Bermúdez | 38 |
| 2012–13 | 1 | 1ª | 1st | 30 | 24 | 4 | 2 | 91 | 12 | 76 | Champion | | Champion | Round of 32 | | (Spain) Sonia Bermúdez | 20 |
| 2013–14 | 1 | 1ª | 1st | 30 | 25 | 4 | 1 | 82 | 11 | 79 | Champion | | Runner-up | Quarterfinals | | (Spain) Sonia Bermúdez | 28 |
| 2014–15 | 1 | 1ª | 1st | 30 | 25 | 2 | 3 | 93 | 9 | 77 | Semifinals | | Champion | Round of 16 | | (Spain) Sonia Bermúdez | 22 |
| 2015–16 | 1 | 1ª | 2nd | 30 | 24 | 5 | 1 | 98 | 12 | 77 | Runner-up | | Champion | Quarterfinals | | (Spain) Jennifer Hermoso | 24 |
| 2016–17 | 1 | 1ª | 2nd | 30 | 24 | 3 | 3 | 98 | 13 | 75 | Champion | | Champion | Semifinals | | (Spain) Jennifer Hermoso | 35 |
| 2017–18 | 1 | 1ª | 2nd | 30 | 24 | 4 | 2 | 98 | 12 | 76 | Champion | | Champion | Quarterfinals | | (Brazil) Andressa Alves | 12 |
| 2018–19 | 1 | 1ª | 2nd | 30 | 25 | 3 | 2 | 94 | 15 | 78 | Semifinals | | Champion | Runner-up | | (Spain) Alexia Putellas | 16 |
| 2019–20 | 1 | 1ª | 1st | 21 | 19 | 2 | 0 | 86 | 6 | 59 | Champion | Champion | Champion | Semifinals | | (Spain) Jennifer Hermoso | 23 |
| 2020–21 | 1 | 1ª | 1st | 34 | 33 | 0 | 1 | 167 | 15 | 99 | Champion | Semifinals | | Champion | | (Spain) Jennifer Hermoso | 31 |
| 2021–22 | 1 | 1ª | 1st | 30 | 30 | 0 | 0 | 159 | 11 | 90 | Champion | Champion | | Runner-up | | (Nigeria) Asisat Oshoala | 20 |
| 2022–23 | 1 | 1ª | 1st | 30 | 28 | 1 | 1 | 118 | 10 | 85 | Round of 16 | Champion | — (Note: After a hiatus due to the pandemic, the Copa Catalunya returned in 2022, as a strictly amateur competition. For the 2025–26 season, it also became amateur.) | Champion | | (Nigeria) Asisat Oshoala | 21 |
| 2023–24 | 1 | 1ª | 1st | 30 | 29 | 1 | 0 | 137 | 10 | 88 | Champion | Champion | — | Champion | | (Norway) Caroline Graham Hansen | 21 |
| 2024–25 | 1 | 1ª | 1st | 30 | 28 | 0 | 2 | 128 | 16 | 84 | Champion | Champion | Champion (Note: The competition incorporated professional teams again during the 2024–25 season. The final was played at the beginning of the 2025–26 season.) | Runner-up | | (Poland) Ewa Pajor | 25 |
| 2025–26 | 1 | 1ª | 1st | 30 | 29 | 0 | 1 | 130 | 9 | 87 | Champion | Champion | — | Champion | — | (Spain) Clàudia Pina | 21 |
