= 1988–89 Barcelona Atlétic femenino season =

Barcelona Atlétic femenino
1988–89 season
- Chairman: Josep Lluís Núñez
- Stadium: Zona Esportiva del FC Barcelona
- Lliga catalana: 3rd
- Copa Catalana: Quarterfinals
- Top goalscorer: Ariadna (14)

The 1988–89 season was the first for Barcelona Atlétic as the subsidiary team of Club Femení Barcelona. Barcelona Atlétic competed in the Lliga catalana and the Copa Catalana.

The team had been formed in November 1988, when another local team, Gràcia Cal Majó, merged with CF Barcelona. This merger occurred before the leagues had begun that season, with Barcelona set to compete in the newly created Liga Nacional and Gràcia Cal Majó in the now-secondary Lliga catalana. Both teams had already competed in the group stage of the Copa Catalana (a direct predecessor of the Copa Catalunya), and in the same group, with both advancing to the knockout stages.

Two Gràcia Cal Majó players at the start of the season – Àfrica Ocaña and Gemma Homar – were already included in the Catalan national team at the time of the merger, and had been integrated into the CF Barcelona team (instead of remaining with Barcelona Atlètic) by March 1989.

== League ==
Barcelona Atlètic started the league strong in their first match before suffering three tough defeats in a row. On the fifth matchday, they worked hard to post another strong victory. Over the next three matchdays, Barcelona Atlètic continued climbing the league table with impressive wins, considered to be hitting their stride and getting the feel for the league after a "stuttering start". On matchday 8 against Catalunya, they were held to 0–0 at half time but "scored as they pleased" in the second half to post a 6–0 victory. Their rise continued in the next match when they defeated league leaders Torroella, though not without controversy. Described in Mundo Deportivo as a high quality and entertaining match, there were some dubious refereeing calls, including two notable decisions that both went in Barcelona Atlètic's favour: a potential penalty for Torroella not given, and a borderline goal scored by Torroella chalked off. The winning streak ended in the next match, when Barcelona Atlètic faced Athenas, the other team ahead of them in the league, in a match of two halves. Barcelona Atlètic had dominated the first half of the match, scoring in the third minute and going into the break with this advantage, before Athenas "started playing well" in the second half and put four goals past Barcelona Atlètic in ten minutes.

League result summary
Pld	W	D	L	GF	GA	GD	Pts	Pos
12	6	1	5	34	24	+10	13	3rd

19 November 1988 1	Barcelona Atl.	3–1	Catalunya	Barcelona
19:00	Olga 10', 37'; Pili 70'		Marta 12'	Stadium: Mini Estadi; Referee: Solé
Note: Catalunya played with eight players, as others had not shown up.

26 November 1988 2	Torroella	4–1	Barcelona Atl.	Sant Fruitós de Bages
	Eva 5'; Conchi 45', 74'; Encarna		Olga 55'	Stadium: Municipal de Sant Fruitós; Referee: Jesús Pérez

3 December 1988 3	Barcelona Atl.	0–3	Athenas	Barcelona
19:00			Fina; Inma	Stadium: Mini Estadi

11 December 1988 4	Llers	1–0	Barcelona Atl.	Llers
11:30				Stadium: Campo Municipal de Llers

18 December 1988 5	Vilapiscina	1–4	Barcelona Atl.	Barcelona
14:00	Emilia		Maite; Anaya; Olga	Stadium: Campo Turó de la Peira

8 January 1989 6	Barcelona Atl.	7–0	Artes
	Ariadna; Mayte

~~15 January 1989~~ ~~7~~	~~San Adrián~~	void	~~Barcelona Atl.~~	~~Sant Adrià de Besòs~~
Note: Suspended due to San Adrián not meeting the minimum number of players to proceed; Barcelona Atlétic, as the visitors and with the correct amount of players, was originally awarded the win in a walkover before San Adrián withdrew from the league and their previous matches were voided.

28 January 1989 8	Catalunya	0–6	Barcelona Atl.
20:00			Ariadna; Dolors; Graciela; Mayte

(4?) February 1989 9	Barcelona At.	4–3	Torroella
	Ariadna; Mayte	Report	Manoli; Conchi; Mari Angeles	Referee: Ginés

12 February 1989 10	Athenas	5–1	Barcelona At.
12:00	Fina; Luisa; Guay		Mayte 3'

18 February 1989 11	Barcelona At.	2–2	Llers
19:00	Ariadna (yellow card); Olga (yellow card); Esperanza (yellow card)		Elvira; Mani; Agustí (yellow card); Gelada (yellow card); Busquets (red card)	Referee: Blanch

25 February 1989 12	Barcelona At.	2–3	Vilapiscina
19:00	Ariadna; Montse		Emi; Tachi

5 March 1989 13	Artés	1–4	Barcelona At.
16:00	Eva (pen.)		Rosi; Graciela; Mayte; Ariadna

== Copa Catalana ==
=== Group stage ===
The team started the season and competed in the Copa Catalana group stage as Gracia Cal Majó. They sat out matchdays 2 and 5 of the group stage due to odd number of teams.

25 September 1988 1	Barcelona	2–2	Gracia Cal Majó	Barcelona
10:00

October 1988 3	Gràcia Cal Majó	0–0	Catalunya
		Report

4	Gracia Cal Majó	2–5	Barcelona	Barcelona
		Report

6	Catalunya	2–6	Gracia Cal Majó
		Report

=== Knockout stage ===
Both Barcelona Atlétic and CF Barcelona exited the Copa Catalana at the quarterfinals stage.

May 1989 Quarterfinal – Leg 1	Espanyol	3–0	Barcelona At.

17 May 1989 Quarterfinal – Leg 2	Barcelona At.	0–1	Espanyol
Note: Held midweek due to Espanyol's participation in the Copa de la Reina. Espanyol advance 4–0 on aggregate.

== See also ==
- 1988–89 Club Femení Barcelona season
