= 2025–26 Copa Catalunya Femenina =

Women's football competition in Catalonia, Spain

The 2025–26 edition of the Copa Catalunya Femenina will be played between August 2025 and 2026. Barcelona reclaimed the trophy in the 2024–25 edition, to become eleven-time winners. They were not allowed to defend their title, due to format changes, with SE AEM instead winning their second cup.

The format for the 2025–26 edition will pit the best teams (Note: Of those which have not been excluded or exempted) (per a Catalan Football Federation coefficient) in each division against each other in each round. Unlike the previous season, professional teams will once again be excluded; however, professional clubs will be able to field their subsidiary teams. The competition is open to teams which, in the previous season, competed in the second division and below of the national league, and group champions at all levels of the Catalan league.

Participation for qualified teams is compulsory, unless exempted for some reason. The disqualified teams – those which competed in the Liga F in the 2024–25 season – are Barcelona ("A"), Badalona, and Espanyol ("A"). These clubs are instead represented by their "B" teams: Barcelona B, Ona Sant Adrià, and Espanyol B, respectively.

SE AEM won their second Copa Catalunya Femenina (following their B team's victory in 2023), with CE Europa making their first final after being frequent semi-finalists.

== First round ==
The first round of the 2025–26 Copa Catalunya will be played on 30/31 August 2025, two weeks after the final of the previous edition. It features the group champions from the 2024–25 Segona Divisió, except ARO CE, the best team with a 3.00 coefficient, which was exempted.

30 August 2025	Martinenc	2–3	CE Berga	Guinardó
20:15 CEST		Report		Stadium: CEM Guinardó

30 August 2025	CF Singuerlín	2–1	CF Inter Granollers	Santa Coloma de Gramenet
20:30 CEST		Report		Stadium: CEM Can Zam, Pitch 2

31 August 2025	PB Sant Vicenç Horts	0–3	UE Aldeana	Sant Vicenç dels Horts
18:00 CEST		Report		Stadium: Municipal La Barruana

== Second round ==
6 September 2025	UE Aldeana	5–1	CF Pardinyes
17:30 CEST		Report

6 September 2025	CF Singuerlín	5–1	ARO CE	Santa Coloma de Gramenet
20:00 CEST		Report		Stadium: CEM Can Zam, Pitch 2

7 September 2025	CE Berga	2–5	CE Sabadell
18:00 CEST		Report

== Third round ==
14 September 2025	Escola Futbol Mataró	0–5	Vic Riuprimer	Mataró
17:00 CEST		Report		Stadium: Camp del Centenari; Referee: Ivette Velasco Lampurdanes

14 September 2025	CE Sabadell	1–7	CF Igualada	Sabadell
18:30 CEST		Report		Stadium: Complex Esportiu Municipal Olímpia; Referee: Aida Monago del Río

14 September 2025	CF Singuerlín	0–4	CD Fontsanta-Fatjo	Santa Coloma de Gramenet
20:00 CEST		Report		Stadium: CEM Can Zam, Pitch 2 Referee: Maria Salvador Molina

24 September 2025	UE Aldeana	2–2 (a.e.t.) (2–4 p)	CD Riudoms	L'Aldea
20:30 CEST		Report		Stadium: Unio Esportiva Aldeana; Referee: Andrea Sopena Lopez

== Fourth round ==
22 October 2025	Vic Riuprimer	1–0	CE Seagull Badalona	Vic
20:30 CET		Report		Stadium: Estadi ZEM Hipòlit Planàs; Referee: Martina Cárdenas López

25 October 2025	CD Riudoms	0–4	CF Igualada	Riudoms
16:00 CET		Report		Stadium: Camps de Futbol Municipals de Riudoms; Referee: Lorena Prunera Aguayo

26 October 2025	CD Fontsanta-Fatjo	0–0 (a.e.t.) (2–3 p)	RCD Espanyol B	Cornellà de Llobregat
20:00 CET		Report		Stadium: Camp municipal de futbol Fontsanta-Fatjó; Referee: Ivette Velasco Lampurdanes

== Quarter-finals ==
26 November 2025	FC Ona Sant Adrià	3–0	UE Cornellà	Sant Adrià de Besòs
20:45 CET	Barrón 20'; Rodrigo 61'; Ballesta 81'	Report		Stadium: Camp de Futbol CEM Besós-Trajana; Referee: Sandra González Jiménez

26 November 2025	CF Igualada	0–5	SE AEM	Igualada
21:00 CET		Report	Acín 27'; Fernández 54', 64'; Hormigo 75'; Yonei 84'	Stadium: CEM Les Comes 2 Camps; Referee: Neus Albalat Queralt

27 November 2025	RCD Espanyol B	1–6	CE Europa	Sant Adrià de Besòs
21:15 CET	Garrido 23'	Report	Núñez 21'; Clemente 29', 48'; Carla 33'; Plaza 80'; Bové 89'	Stadium: Ciutat Esportiva Dani Jarque; Referee: Carla Borràs Polo

30 November 2025	Vic Riuprimer	1–4	FC Barcelona B	Vic
18:00 CET	Clota 16'	Report	Gálvez 4'; Arufe 67'; Palles 73' (o.g.); Martret 78'	Stadium: Estadi ZEM Hipòlit Planàs; Referee: Maria Del Castillo Garcia Franco

== Semi-finals ==
4 February 2026	CE Europa	3–1	FC Barcelona B	Barcelona
20:30 CET	Bové 49'; Gómez 54', 56'	Report	Ferrera 71'	Stadium: Nou Sardenya; Referee: Alba Arija Asín

11 February 2026	FC Ona Sant Adrià	2–3	SE AEM	Sant Adrià de Besòs
19:00 CET	Hoekstra 41'; Maillo 70'	Report	Yonei 39'; Fernández 67'; Molina 82'	Stadium: Camp de Futbol CEM Besós-Trajana; Referee: Irene López Brustenga

== Final ==
8 May 2026	CE Europa	3–3 (2–3 p)	SE AEM	Barcelona
18:15 CEST	Torres 19'; Bové 51'; Clemente 54'	Report	Fernández 7' (pen.); Charle 10'; Peñalver 15'	Stadium: Estadi dels Alumnes Obrers de Vilanova; Referee: Sandra González Jiménez
	Penalties
	Júlia Gómez (penalty scored); Ariadna Márquez (penalty missed); Anon Kojima (penalty scored); Haizea (penalty missed); Sara López (penalty missed)		(penalty missed) Noelia Fernández; (penalty scored) Nora Sanchez; (penalty scored) María Loba; (penalty scored) Silvia Peñalver

=== Top goalscorers ===
Rank	Player	Team	Goals
1	(Brazil) Stefany Ferrer Van Ginkel	CF Igualada	6
2	(Spain) Maria Martin Octavio	CF Singuerlín	4
3	(Spain) Rut Cervera López	Vic Riuprimer	3
3	(Spain) Judit Borràs Bertomeu	UE Aldeana	3
3	(Spain) Noelia Fernández Rodríguez	SE AEM	3
3	(Spain) Anna Bové	CE Europa	3
