= 2002–03 FC Barcelona Femení season =

FC Barcelona Femení
2002–03 season
- Chairman: Joan Gaspart; Enric Reyna; Joan Laporta
- Manager: Natalia Astrain
- Stadium: Mini Estadi
- League: 1st and classification for promotion play-offs
Home colours	Away colours	Third colours

The 2002–03 season was FC Barcelona Femení's second in the Primera Nacional (second tier), after winning the league but failing to earn promotion in the previous season.

== Overview ==
The team won their group of the Primera Nacional (second tier), and achieved classification for the promotion play-offs to reach the Superliga but failed to qualify.

On 2 July 2002, FC Barcelona officially incorporated the women's team as a section of the club.

The team played home games on pitch 3 of the Mini Estadi.

== Players ==
Note: Flags indicate national team as defined under FIFA eligibility rules; some limited exceptions apply. Players may hold more than one non-FIFA nationality.

No.	Pos.	Nation	Player
—	GK	(Spain) ESP	Alba Montserrat
—	GK	(Spain) ESP	Marina Marimon
—	DF	(Spain) ESP	Ana María Escribano
—	DF	(Spain) ESP	Sheila Sanchón
—	DF	(Spain) ESP	Marisa Quiles
—	DF	(Spain) ESP	Verónica Navarro
—	MF	(Spain) ESP	Margalida Mas

No.	Pos.	Nation	Player
—	MF	(Spain) ESP	Alba Mena
—	MF	(Spain) ESP	Alba Vilas
—	MF	(Spain) ESP	Desiree Moya
—	FW	(Spain) ESP	Laia Ramón
—	FW	(Spain) ESP	Adriana Martín
—		(Spain) ESP	Natalia Arroyo

== Competitions ==
Win Draw Loss

=== League ===
22 September 2002 1	Barcelona	9–0	Salt (femení)	Barcelona
				Stadium: Mini Estadi

29 September 2002 2	Centre d'Esports Sabadell Futbol Club (femení)	3–3	Barcelona	Sabadell

6 October 2002 3	Barcelona	4–0	Club de Fútbol Llers (femení)	Barcelona
				Stadium: Mini Estadi

13 October 2002 4	Club de Futbol Platges de Calvià (femení)	1–3	Barcelona	Magaluf

20 October 2002 5	Barcelona	5–0	Unió Esportiva L'Estartit (femení)	Barcelona
				Stadium: Mini Estadi

27 October 2002 6	CF Pardinyes (femení)	0–5	Barcelona	Pardinyes

3 November 2002 7	Agrupació Esportiva La Canya (femení)	2–2	Barcelona	La Canya

10 November 2002 8	Barcelona	9–1	Unió Esportiva Breda (femení)	Barcelona
				Stadium: Mini Estadi

17 November 2002 9	Club Futbol Femení Tortosa Ebre	2–3	Barcelona	Tortosa
				Stadium: Municipal de Tortosa

24 November 2002 10	Barcelona	7–2	UD Collerense	Barcelona
				Stadium: Mini Estadi

1 December 2002 11	Club Esportiu Riudarenes (femení)	0–9	Barcelona	Riudarenes

8 December 2002 12	Barcelona	9–0	CF Igualada (femení)	Barcelona
				Stadium: Mini Estadi

15 December 2002 13	Club Esportiu Sant Gabriel	2–3	Barcelona	Sant Adrià de Besòs

12 January 2003 14	Salt (femení)	0–9	Barcelona	Salt

26 January 2003 15	Barcelona	9–0	Centre d'Esports Sabadell Futbol Club (femení)	Barcelona
				Stadium: Mini Estadi

2 February 2003 16	Club de Fútbol Llers (femení)	1–1	Barcelona	Llers

9 February 2003 17	Barcelona	4–1	Club de Futbol Platges de Calvià (femení)	Barcelona
				Stadium: Mini Estadi

16 February 2003 18	Unió Esportiva L'Estartit (femení)	0–7	Barcelona	L'Estartit

2 March 2003 19	Barcelona	7–0	CF Pardinyes (femení)	Barcelona
				Stadium: Mini Estadi

16 March 2003 20	Barcelona	2–0	Agrupació Esportiva La Canya (femení)	Barcelona
				Stadium: Mini Estadi

23 March 2003 21	Unió Esportiva Breda (femení)	0–3	Barcelona	Breda

30 March 2003 22	Barcelona	5–2	Club Futbol Femení Tortosa Ebre	Barcelona
				Stadium: Mini Estadi

6 April 2004 23	UD Collerense	1–5	Barcelona	Palma
				Stadium: Camp Municipal Coll d'en Rebassa, Ca'n Caimari

27 April 2003 24	Barcelona	10–0	Club Esportiu Riudarenes (femení)	Barcelona
				Stadium: Mini Estadi

18 May 2003 25	CF Igualada (femení)	0–3	Barcelona	Igualada

25 May 2003 26	Barcelona	2–2	Club Esportiu Sant Gabriel	Barcelona
				Stadium: Mini Estadi

=== Promotion play-offs ===
8 June 2003 1	Barcelona	2–1	Gijón FF	Barcelona
				Stadium: Mini Estadi

15 June 2003 2	Sociedad Deportiva Lagunak (femení)	2–1	Barcelona	Barañáin
				Stadium: Servicio Municipal Lagunak

22 June 2003 3	Rest
