= 2003–04 FC Barcelona Femení season =

FC Barcelona Femení
2003–04 season
- Chairman: Joan Laporta
- Manager: Natalia Astrain
- Stadium: Mini Estadi
- League: 1st and promotion to Superliga
Home colours	Away colours	Third colours

The 2003–04 season was FC Barcelona Femení's third in the Primera Nacional (second tier), after winning the league but failing to earn promotion in each of the two previous seasons.

== Summary ==
The arrival of Joan Laporta as president of FC Barcelona saw an upturn in the outlook of the women's team. Laporta oversaw the team become incorporated into the structure of the club's youth football programme, including having Pitch 3 at the Mini Estadi to use for training, which strengthened them. As in the previous seasons since the league was restructured, Barcelona won the Catalonia and Balearic Islands group (group 3) of the Primera Nacional (second national tier). They then won each round of the promotion play-offs to return to the top flight.

== Players ==
=== First team ===
As of:

Note: Flags indicate national team as defined under FIFA eligibility rules; some limited exceptions apply. Players may hold more than one non-FIFA nationality.

No.	Pos.	Nation	Player
—	GK	(Spain) ESP	María José Pons "Mariajo"
—	GK	(Spain) ESP	Marina Marimon
—	GK	(Spain) ESP	Cristina Molina
—	DF	(Spain) ESP	Ana María Escribano
—	DF	(Spain) ESP	Carla Tomàs
—	DF	(Spain) ESP	Sheila Sanchón
—	DF	(Spain) ESP	Marisa Quiles
—	DF	(Spain) ESP	Verónica Navarro
—	DF	(Spain) ESP	Zaida González

No.	Pos.	Nation	Player
—	MF	(Spain) ESP	Margalida Mas
—	MF	(Spain) ESP	Alba Mena
—	MF	(Spain) ESP	Elia Giménez
—	MF	(Spain) ESP	Araceli José
—	MF	(Spain) ESP	Alba Vilas
2	MF	(Spain) ESP	Ana Carralero
—	MF	(Spain) ESP	Desiree Moya
—	FW	(Spain) ESP	Laia Ramón
—	FW	(Romania) ROU	Simona Vintilă

== Competitions ==
Win Draw Loss

=== League ===
14 September 2003 1	Barcelona	4–0	CF Igualada	Barcelona
				Stadium: Pitch 2, Mini Estadi

21 September 2003 2	CE Sant Gabriel	1–3	Barcelona	Sant Adrià de Besòs

28 September 2003 3	Barcelona	1–2	CF Platges de Calvià	Barcelona
				Stadium: Pitch 2, Mini Estadi

5 October 2003 4	CE Sabadell B	0–3	Barcelona	Sabadell

12 October 2003 5	Barcelona	3–0	CD Serverense	Barcelona
				Stadium: Pitch 2, Mini Estadi

19 October 2003 6	RCD Espanyol B	2–2	Barcelona	Sant Adrià del Besòs
				Stadium: Ciutat Esportiva de Sant Adrià

26 October 2003 7	Barcelona	6–1	Girona FC	Barcelona
				Stadium: Pitch 2, Mini Estadi

2 November 2003 8	UD Collerense	0–2	Barcelona	Palma de Mallorca
				Stadium: Camp Municipal Coll d'en Rebassa

9 November 2003 9	Barcelona	4–1	CF Pardinyes	Barcelona
				Stadium: Pitch 2, Mini Estadi

23 November 2003 10	CFF Tortosa Ebre	0–1	Barcelona	Tortosa
				Stadium: Municipal de Tortosa

30 November 2003 11	CF Vilanova i la Geltrú	0–5	Barcelona	Vilanova i la Geltrú

7 December 2003 12	Barcelona	3–0	UE L'Estartit	Barcelona
				Stadium: Pitch 2, Mini Estadi

14 December 2003 13	CF Llers	1–4	Barcelona	Llers

21 December 2003 14	CF Igualada	0–2	Barcelona	Igualada

18 January 2004 15	Barcelona	5–1	CE Sant Gabriel	Barcelona
				Stadium: Pitch 2, Mini Estadi

25 January 2004 16	CF Platges de Calvià	0–2	Barcelona	Magaluf

1 February 2004 17	Barcelona	4–0	CE Sabadell B	Barcelona
				Stadium: Pitch 2, Mini Estadi

8 February 2004 18	CD Serverense	1–3	Barcelona	Son Servera

15 February 2004 19	Barcelona	6–0	RCD Espanyol B	Barcelona
				Stadium: Pitch 2, Mini Estadi

7 March 2004 20	Girona FC	2–2	Barcelona	Girona

14 March 2004 21	Barcelona	5–2	UD Collerense	Barcelona
				Stadium: Pitch 2, Mini Estadi

28 March 2004 22	CF Pardinyes	0–7	Barcelona	Pardinyes

4 April 2004 23	Barcelona	8–1	CFF Tortosa Ebre	Barcelona
				Stadium: Pitch 2, Mini Estadi

11 April 2004 24	Barcelona	6–0	CF Vilanova i la Geltrú	Barcelona
				Stadium: Pitch 2, Mini Estadi

25 April 2004 25	UE L'Estartit	1–5	Barcelona	L'Estartit

9 May 2004 26	Barcelona	4–1	CF Llers	Barcelona
				Stadium: Pitch 2, Mini Estadi

=== Promotion play-offs ===
==== Group stage ====
16 May 2004 1	Atlético Madrid	0–1	Barcelona	Majadahonda

6 June 2004 2	rest

13 June 2004 3	Barcelona	6–1	CD Rayco	Barcelona
	Laia Ramón; Desirée; Zaida; Simona		Desi (red card)	Stadium: Mini Estadi

==== Promotion stage ====
20 June 2004 Leg 1	Barcelona	2–0	Oiartzun KE	Barcelona
12:00	Laia Ramón; Simona Vintilă			Stadium: Mini Estadi

27 June 2004 Leg 2	Oiartzun KE	2–3	Barcelona	Oiartzun
	Naiara 16'; Intza 78'; Cristina (yellow card)	,	Laia 3', 76'; Mas 7' (Note: Some sources identify Laia as the scorer of this goal, too.); Carralero (red card); Pons (yellow card); Giménez (yellow card); Moya (yellow card)	Stadium: Karla Lekuona; Attendance: 600; Referee: Gómez Ríos
