= 1978–79 P.F. Barcelona season =

Peña Femenina Barcelona
1978–79 season
- Chairman: Raimon Carrasco (interim); Josep Lluís Núñez

The 1978–79 season was the eighth year and fifth season in existence for P.F. Barcelona. During pre-season, the team continued playing against European champions as they had done in 1977, placing fifth in the international tournament. There was a Catalan league that operated for the 1978–79 season. In the associated cup competition, Barcelona Atlètic finished as runners-up after losing on penalties in the final. The reports do not indicate if Barcelona's first team took part in either the league or cup.

On the initiative of Josep Lluís Núñez, who had become FC Barcelona president in 1978, the women's teams received a comparably high level of support and were both able to train and play at the club's main facilities.

== Torneo Internacional de Fútbol Femenino ==
Barcelona took part in what Spanish media referred to as the Torneo Internacional de Fútbol Femenino, a European club competition that in May 1978 was hosted by Landhaus, the winners of the 1977–78 Austrian league, in Vienna. Teams from seven European nations took part.

In the group stage, Barcelona was part of Group A. This group resulted in a three-way tie on points, which was resolved by comparing goals scored and goals conceded; Barcelona went into the play-off for fifth place based on this.

After their strong performances, Barcelona was invited back to compete in the 1979 edition in Cannes. This instead took place in Royan with Karbo as Spanish representative.

13 May 1978 Group A	P.F. Barcelonista (Spain)	3–2	(France) Cannes	Vienna, Austria
		Report

13/14 May 1978 Group A	P.F. Barcelonista (Spain)	1–2	(Austria) Landhaus	Vienna, Austria
		Report

13/14 May 1978 Group A	P.F. Barcelonista (Spain)	1–0	(Switzerland) Therwil	Vienna, Austria
		Report

15 May 1978 Fifth place play-off	P.F. Barcelonista (Spain)	3–0	(Sweden) Rönninge SK	Vienna, Austria
		Report

== Friendlies ==
16 July 1978	P.F. Barcelonista (Spain)	v	(Netherlands) RKTVC Tiel "A"	Barcelona
~17:00		Report		Stadium: Campo U.D. Horta

18 July 1978	P.F. Barcelonista (Spain)	v	(Netherlands) RKTVC Tiel "A"	Barcelona
~18:00		Report		Stadium: Campo U.D. Pueblo Seco

== Provincial Cup ==
P.F. Barcelona Atlètic reached the final of the provincial cup competition organised by Deporte Laboral. In the final, Barcelona Atlètic was ahead by a goal at halftime, before Espanyol (listed both informally as Espanyol and formally as P. F. Blanquiazul) equalised in the second half. The game went to a penalty shoot-out, and Espanyol goalkeeper Camúñez saved three of Barcelona Atlètic's penalty kicks to give Espanyol the victory.

June 1979 Cup Final	P. F. Blanquiazul	1–1	P. F. Barcelona At.
	Montse	Report	Artés
	Penalties
			Penalty missed
Note: Espanyol win on penalties
