= Nunez (disambiguation) =

Nuñez is a surname.

Nunez or Nuñez may also refer to:

- Núñez, Buenos Aires, a barrio of Buenos Aires, Argentina
- Nunez, Georgia, a town in Georgia, United States
- Nunez, Louisiana, an unincorporated community in Louisiana, United States
- Nunez River, a river in Guinea
- Nuñez Point, a point on Takaki Promontory in Antarctica
- Nuñez Peninsula, a peninsula on the south coast of South Georgia
  - Cape Nuñez, a headland of Nuñez Peninsula
- Nunez Community College, a college in Chalmette, Louisiana

== See also ==
- Mendez-Nuñez, Cavite, a municipality in the Philippines
- Rafael Núñez International Airport, an airport in Cartagena, Colombia
- Núñez i Navarro Hotels, a Spanish hotel chain
