= 1988–89 Club Femení Barcelona season =

Club Femení Barcelona
1988–89 season
- Chairman: Josep Lluís Núñez
- Manager: Ramón Carrión
- Stadium: Zona Esportiva del FC Barcelona
- Liga Nacional: 4th
- Copa Catalana: Quarterfinals
Home colours	Away colours

The 1988–1989 season was the first season that Club Femení Barcelona played in a federation-recognised national league, with the 1988–89 Liga Nacional de Fútbol Femenino. The team played home games at the Zona Esportiva del FC Barcelona.

== Events ==
Following the recognition of women's football by the Royal Spanish Football Federation (RFEF), a top flight national league was created, then known as the Liga Nacional. It began on 4 December 1988 and lasted through 30 April 1989.

Club Femení Barcelona had previously been known as Peña Femenina Barcelonista, but had changed its name in the 1982–83 season. A different team, Peña Barcelonista Barcilona, also competed in (and eventually won) the inaugural league.

Each team sat out two matchdays due to the odd number of teams in the league; Barcelona rested on matchday 8 (5 February 1989) and matchday 17 (23 April 1989). Barcelona finished fourth in the league, tied on points with rivals Español but losing out on goal difference.

The 1989 Copa de la Reina de Fútbol became a national cup with the introduction of an official national league. Barcelona renounced playing in the Copa de la Reina in the season.

In November 1988, after the Catalan Cup but before the start of the Liga Nacional, the club Gracia Cal Majó merged with Barcelona to become its subsidiary team known as Barcelona Atlétic. This team continued in the Catalan League, but had also advanced to the next round of the Catalan Cup along with Barcelona.

== Players ==
Among the players for Barcelona during this season were Pilar Moreno, Kety Pulido, I. Castañón, Adelina Pastor Martínez, Sagrario Serrano, Rosario Roura, Julia Rico, Àfrica Ocaña Fernández, Gemma Homar, Eulàlia/Laia Fusté, Inés de Carreras and Sílvia Gelabert Udina.

== Friendlies ==
November 1988	Barcelona	0–3	Vallés Occidental	Barcelona
		Report
Note: Preparation friendly ahead of the Liga Nacional.

== Copa Catalana ==
The Copa Catalana – a direct predecessor of the Copa Catalunya – was held before the league for the first time in the 1988–89 season, meaning that there were two editions held in 1988. María Teresa Andreu, president of women's football, explained that the rescheduling was due to the RFEF organising the new Liga Nacional to begin in November: Catalonia's top four teams, including Barcelona, were joining the Liga Nacional and the FCF felt they would be rusty if they did not play during the intervening months.

The cup was contested by thirteen teams divided into four groups. It was initially played in a mini-league format, beginning in September 1988; the top two teams in each group would proceed to the knock-out stages to be held after the conclusion of the leagues.

=== Group stage ===
Barcelona was in group 4 along with Gracia Cal Majó and Catalunya CFF. Due to the odd number of teams in the group, each team sat out two matchdays. Barcelona rested on days 3 and 6.

25 September 1988 1	Barcelona	2–2	Gracia Cal Majó	Barcelona
10:00

4	Gracia Cal Majó	2–5	Barcelona	Barcelona
		Report

22 October 1988 5	Barcelona	v	Catalunya	Barcelona
19:00		Report

5 November 1988 2	Catalunya	v	Barcelona
20:00		Report
Note: Originally scheduled for 1 October, the match was postponed due to a car crash involving vehicles transporting the Catalunya players, leaving many of them injured. Barcelona had already qualified, with Catalunya unable to qualify, before the match was ultimately played in November.

=== Knockout stage ===
The Copa Catalana resumed on 6 May 1989.

May 1989 Quarterfinal – Leg 1	Barcelona	2–1	Sabadell

13 May 1989 Quarterfinal – Leg 2	Sabadell	3–1	Barcelona
18:30
Note: Sabadell advance 4–3 on aggregate

== Liga Nacional ==
4 December 1988 1	Barcelona	1–0	Parque Alcobendas	Barcelona
				Stadium: Zona Esportiva del FC Barcelona

11 December 1988 2	Español	2–2	Barcelona	Barcelona

18 December 1988 3	Olímpico Fortuna	2–1	Barcelona	Madrid

8 January 1989 4	Barcelona	0–0	PB Barcilona	Barcelona
				Stadium: Zona Esportiva del FC Barcelona

15 January 1989 5	Santa María	2–3	Barcelona	Santa María del Camí

22 January 1989 6	Barcelona	2–1	Vallès Occidental	Barcelona
				Stadium: Zona Esportiva del FC Barcelona

29 January 1989 7	Sabadell	1–1	Barcelona	Sabadell

12 February 1989 9	Puente Castro	2–5	Barcelona	León

26 February 1989 10	Parque Alcobendas	4–0	Barcelona	Alcobendas

5 March 1989 11	Barcelona	1–1	Español	Barcelona
				Stadium: Zona Esportiva del FC Barcelona

12 March 1989 12	Barcelona	1–1	Olímpico Fortuna	Barcelona
				Stadium: Zona Esportiva del FC Barcelona

19 March 1989 13	PB Barcilona	3–0	Barcelona	Barcelona

2 April 1989 14	Barcelona	5–0	Santa María	Barcelona
				Stadium: Zona Esportiva del FC Barcelona

9 April 1989 15	Vallès Occidental	0–1	Barcelona	Sabadell
15:15		Report	Rico	Stadium: Ciutat Esportiva de Sant Adrià

16 April 1989 16	Barcelona	3–2	Sabadell	Barcelona
				Stadium: Zona Esportiva del FC Barcelona

30 April 1989 18	Barcelona	3–3	Puente Castro	Barcelona
				Stadium: Zona Esportiva del FC Barcelona

Source: AREFE Polideportivoa

== See also ==
- 1988–89 Barcelona Atlétic femenino season
