= 2004–05 FC Barcelona Femení season =

FC Barcelona Femení
2004–05 season
- Chairman: Joan Laporta
- Manager: Natalia Astrain
- Stadium: Mini Estadi
- League: 9th
- Top goalscorer: Adriana Martín (22)
Home colours	Away colours	Third colours

The 2004–05 FC Barcelona Femení season was the club's ninth in the top flight of Spanish football, though their first in the top flight after it was restructured into the Superliga in 2001. Having won the second division every season, Barcelona earned promotion through play-offs for the first time in 2004.

== Summary ==
Barcelona promoted defender Melanie Serrano from the B team and signed top Spanish goalscorer Adriana Martín, among other incorporations, ahead of their debut season in the Superliga. They began the campaign badly, with only one win in the first half of the season. Towards the end of January 2005 they were bottom of the league with only seven points, before signing Mexican star goalscorer Maribel Domínguez (who had been playing summer seasons in the United States) on 25 January 2005. Known as Marigol, she had been originally planning to move to the Mexican men's league in the transfer window, but was prevented from doing so by FIFA and went to the struggling Barcelona instead. Her signing was considered the league's biggest signing since Milene Domingues "Ronaldinha" gave a profile boost to Rayo Vallecano in 2002. Domínguez said at the time that part of her motivation for joining Barcelona was to open doors for more Mexicans to play in Spain, considered a top football nation, with the Superliga being highly restrictive on foreign players at the time. Domínguez debuted in the team's next game, scoring a hat-trick in their 5–0 victory. After a triumphant start, with five goals in her first three games, Domínguez then travelled back to Mexico to serve as an ambassador for FC Barcelona. She returned to Spain ahead of the team's match against Pozuelo.

The team ultimately finished ninth in the Superliga, with Domínguez named captain by the end of the season. Her presence had given the team a boost, and interest from both fans and the media grew massively in the back half of the season; this led to matches being returned to the Mini Estadi (after demotion to the stadium's auxiliary pitches) and for the team to play a three-match tour in Mexico at the end of the season.

== Players ==
=== First team ===
As of

Note: Flags indicate national team as defined under FIFA eligibility rules; some limited exceptions apply. Players may hold more than one non-FIFA nationality.

No.	Pos.	Nation	Player
—	GK	(Spain) ESP	María José Pons "Mariajo"
—	GK	(Spain) ESP	Marina Marimon
—	GK	(Spain) ESP	Cristina Molina
—	DF	(Spain) ESP	Ana María Escribano
—	DF	(Spain) ESP	Carla Tomàs
—	DF	(Spain) ESP	Sheila Sanchón
—	DF	(Spain) ESP	Ana Belén Fuertes "Kaki"
—	DF	(Spain) ESP	Melanie Serrano
—	DF	(Spain) ESP	Verónica Navarro
—	DF	(Spain) ESP	Zaida González
—	MF	(Spain) ESP	Margalida Mas
—	MF	(Spain) ESP	Alba Mena

No.	Pos.	Nation	Player
—	MF	(Spain) ESP	Elia Giménez
—	MF	(Spain) ESP	Berta Carles
—	MF	(Spain) ESP	Alba Vilas
—	MF	(Spain) ESP	Ana Carralero
—	MF	(Spain) ESP	Larraitz Kortabarria
—	MF	(Spain) ESP	Desiree Moya
—	MF	(Spain) ESP	Gemma Quer
10	FW	(Spain) ESP	Adriana Martín
—	FW	(Spain) ESP	Judith Acedo
—	FW	(Mexico) MEX	Maribel Domínguez
—	FW	(Spain) ESP	Laia Ramón
—	FW	(Romania) ROU	Simona Vintilă

FC Barcelona Femení B Note: Flags indicate national team as defined under FIFA eligibility rules; some limited exceptions apply. Players may hold more than one non-FIFA nationality.

No.	Pos.	Nation	Player
—	DF	(Spain) ESP	Gemma Pinto

== Transfers ==
=== In ===
No.	Pos.	Nat.	Player	Moving from	Source
Summer
	DF	(Spain)	Melanie Serrano	Barcelona B	
		(Spain)	Ana Belén Fuertes "Kaki"		
		(Spain)	Berta Carles		
		(Spain)	Larraitz Kortabarria		
		(Spain)	Gemma Quer		
		(Spain)	Adriana Martín		
		(Spain)	Judith Acedo		
Winter
		(Mexico)	Maribel Domínguez		

=== Out ===
No.	Pos.	Nat.	Player	Moving to	Source
Summer
		(Spain)	Marisa Quiles		
		(Spain)	Araceli José		

== Competitions ==
Win Draw Loss

=== League ===
15 September 2004 1	Barcelona	4–4	Espanyol	Barcelona
	Adriana Martín			Stadium: Mini Estadi

19 September 2004 2	Oviedo Moderno	2–1	Barcelona	Oviedo
	1-0 Mónica 17', 2-1 Peque 78'	Report	Laia 69'	Stadium: Manuel Díaz Vega Stadium; Referee: Daniel Díaz Iglesias

26 September 2004 3	Barcelona	2–2	CD Híspalis	Barcelona
	Marga 42'; Desi 44'	Report	0-1 Vanesa 7', 0-2 Amparo 16'	Stadium: Mini Estadi; Referee: Aguilera Hernando

10 October 2004 4	Torrejón	3–1	Barcelona	Torrejón de Ardoz
				Stadium: Camp Las Veredillas

17 October 2004 5	Barcelona	2–2	CFF Estudiantes de Huelva	Barcelona
				Stadium: Pitch 2, Mini Estadi

24 October 2004 6	Rayo Vallecano	1–0	Barcelona	Madrid
				Stadium: Nuestra Señora de la Torre

31 October 2004 7	Barcelona	1–2	Irex Puebla	Barcelona
				Stadium: Pitch 2, Mini Estadi

7 November 2004 8	Levante	4–0	Barcelona	Valencia

14 November 2004 9	Barcelona	1–1	Pozuelo de Alarcón	Barcelona
				Stadium: Pitch 2, Mini Estadi

21 November 2004 10	CE Sabadell	4–0	Barcelona	Sabadell

28 November 2004 11	SD Lagunak	3–1	Barcelona	Barañáin
				Stadium: Servicio Municipal Lagunak

5 December 2004 12	Barcelona	3–0	CD Nuestra Señora de Belén	Barcelona
				Stadium: Pitch 2, Mini Estadi

12 December 2004 13	Athletic Club	5–1	Barcelona	Bilbao
	Irune Murua 4'; Erika Vázquez 42'; Gurutze 56', 77', 87'	Report	Adriana 85'	Stadium: Lezama Facilities; Referee: Aramaio Soto

19 December 2004 14	Espanyol	7–1	Barcelona	Sant Adrià del Besòs
				Stadium: Ciutat Esportiva de Sant Adrià

16 January 2005 15	Barcelona	0–3	Oviedo Moderno	Barcelona
				Stadium: Pitch 2, Mini Estadi

23 January 2005 16	CD Híspalis	8–0	Barcelona	Sevilla

30 January 2005 17	Barcelona	5–0	Torrejón	Barcelona
	Maribel Domínguez; Adriana Martín			Stadium: Pitch 2, Mini Estadi

6 February 2005 18	CFF Estudiantes de Huelva	3–4	Barcelona	Huelva
			Maribel

13 February 2005 19	Barcelona	3–0	Rayo Vallecano	Barcelona
	Adriana 14'; Judith (yellow card) 49'; Alba 67'; Maribel 72' (pen.)			Stadium: Mini Estadi; Attendance: 3,000; Referee: David Tomás

20 February 2005 20	Irex Puebla	0–0	Barcelona	Puebla de la Calzada
				Stadium: Municipal Extremadura

27 February 2005 21	Barcelona	1–2	Levante	Barcelona
				Stadium: Mini Estadi

13 March 2005 22	Pozuelo de Alarcón	0–4	Barcelona	Pozuelo de Alarcón
				Stadium: Valle de las Cañas

20 March 2005 23	Barcelona	1–0	CE Sabadell	Barcelona
				Stadium: Mini Estadi

3 April 2005 24	Barcelona	2–1	SD Lagunak	Barcelona
				Stadium: Mini Estadi

10 April 2005 25	CD Nuestra Señora de Belén	0–4	Barcelona	Burgos
				Stadium: Estadio Municipal José Manuel Sedano

17 April 2005 26	Barcelona	0–2	Athletic Club	Barcelona
		Report	Eli Ibarra 76'; Gurutze 91'	Stadium: Mini Estadi; Referee: Pérez Fuentes

== Friendlies ==
17 February 2005 Friendly	Barcelona	3–1	Catalonia	Barcelona
	Maribel; Adriana	Report

28 May 2005 Mexican Tour	Mexico	2–0	Barcelona	Toluca, Mexico
	Evelyn López 16', 29'; María de Jesús Castillo (red card); Iris Mora (yellow card)	, ,	Verónica Navarro (yellow card); Alba Mena (yellow card); Adriana Martín (yellow card)	Stadium: Estadio de Toluca; Referee: Quetzalli Alvarado

1 June 2005 Mexican Tour	Mexico	1–2	Barcelona	Culiacán, Sinaloa, Mexico
		, ,	Maribel	Stadium: Estadio Carlos González; Attendance: 12,000

4 June 2005 Mexican Tour	Mexico	v	Barcelona	Aguascalientes, Mexico
		, ,		Stadium: Estadio Victoria
