= Rosa Maria Carrasco i Azemar =

Spanish politician

Rosa Maria Carrasco
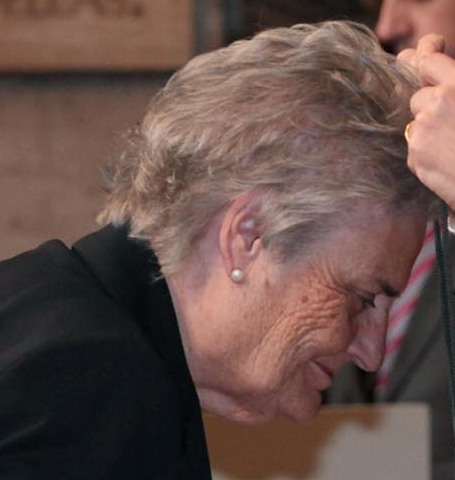
- Carrasco in 2012

Personal details
- Born: July 2, 1936 Barcelona, Spain
- Died: August 6, 2018 (aged 82) Barcelona, Spain
- Party: Democratic Union of Catalonia; Democrats of Catalonia
- Parent: Manuel Carrasco Formiguera (father)
- Relatives: Raimon Carrasco (brother)
- Education: Lycée Français de Barcelone
- Occupation: Politician
- Awards: Creu de Sant Jordi (2012)

Rosa Maria Carrasco i Azemar (2 July 1936 – 6 August 2018) was a Spanish politician from Catalonia, one of the founders of the Democrats of Catalonia party.

== Biography ==
She was the daughter of the historical leader of UCD Manuel Carrasco i Formiguera and Pilar Azemar Puig de la Bellacasa. She was the youngest of eight brothers, among whom is Raimon Carrasco Azemar. Her first months of life were spent in the prison of Burgos, where his mother was imprisoned. In 1938, her father was executed by the francoists in the Castilian capital, who had been Health and Charity Advisor of the Generalitat of Catalonia and deputy for Gerona, in the Constituent Cortes during the Second Republic. Pertaining in Unió Democrática de Catalunya (UDC), he stressed for his defense of the Catholic Church and was sentenced to death after a summary trial despite pressure from the Vatican.

After studying at the French Lyceum in Barcelona, she joined the "scouting movement" of Catalonia and, following in her father's footsteps, she joined UCD's Christianist Catalanism. She was international curator of the Brotherhood of Girl Guides until in 1962 the Guides of St. George were separated, of which she was general commissioner until 1977, when they merged with the Minyons Scouts to found the Minyons Scouts and Guides of Sant Jordi. From 1971 to 1977, she was secretary general of the International Catholic Conference of Girl Guides and from 1978 to 1987, a liaison for Europe of the World Committee of the World Association of Girl Guides and Girl Guides and Girl Scouts.

With the return of the historical leader Josep Tarradellas, she was appointed General Director of Youth in 1978 and the following year, she took part in the creation of the National Council of Youth of Catalonia. Although she did not participated actively in politics, she remained linked to UDC and along with his brother Raimon occupied a symbolic place on the CiU list for the province of Barcelona in the 2011 elections. Since then, and in parallel to the independence process in Catalonia, was approaching the independence sector of Unió, very critical of its president Josep Antoni Duran Lleida. In 2015, when the schism in Unió was a fact, she left the party and joined the separatist split. At that time she founded Demòcrates de Catalunya to defend the best possible way the political legacy of his father. She received the highest order of Catalonia, the Creu de Sant Jordi in 2012.
