= 1995–96 Liga Nacional de Fútbol Femenino =

Liga Nacional
- Season: 1995–95
- Dates: 17 September 1995 – 17 March 1997
- Champions: Añorga (3rd title)
- Relegated: Oviedo Moderno Tradehi
- Matches: 72
- Goals: 300 (4.17 per match)

The 1995–96 División de Honor de Fútbol Femenino was the eighth edition of Spain's women's football premier league. Nine teams took part in the competition, with Atlético Málaga and CF Llers replacing relegated teams Anaitasuna FT, León FF and FFP Alcobendas.

Añorga KKE won its third title with 11 wins in 16 matches and five points difference over Oroquieta Villaverde. Espanyol, CD Sondika and CE Sabadell followed in the table. Oviedo Moderno-Tradehi was relegated.

== Teams and locations ==
Team	Location
Añorga	San Sebastián
Atlético Málaga	Málaga
CF Barcelona	Barcelona
Espanyol	Barcelona
Llers	Llers
Oroquieta Villaverde	Madrid
Oviedo Moderno Tradehi	Oviedo
Sabadell	Sabadell
Sondika	Sondika

== Final table ==
Pos	Team	Pld	W	D	L	GF	GA	GD	Pts	Relegation
1	Añorga	16	11	3	2	44	14	+30	36	
2	Oroquieta Villaverde	16	10	1	5	33	28	+5	31	
3	Espanyol	16	9	3	4	40	29	+11	30	
4	Sondika	16	9	3	4	43	28	+15	30	
5	Sabadell	16	9	1	6	50	26	+24	28	
6	Llers	16	6	1	9	30	48	−18	19	
7	Atlético Málaga	16	4	4	8	22	27	−5	16	
8	CF Barcelona	16	5	1	10	24	34	−10	16	
9	Oviedo Moderno-Tradehi	16	0	1	15	14	66	−52	1	Relegated to Liga Nacional

Source: Arquero Arba
Rules for classification: 1) Points; 2) Head-to-head points; 3) Head-to-head goal difference; 4) Goal difference; 5) Goals scored.
