= Emilia Ibáñez =

Spanish footballer (born 1965)

Personal information
- Full name: Emilia María Ibáñez Fernández
- Date of birth: 3 June 1965 (age 61)
- Place of birth: Badalona, Catalonia, Spain
- Position: Centre forward

Senior career*
| Years | Team | Apps | (Gls) |
| 1979–1987 | Barcelona | | (41+ (Note: Known league goals only. Many match reports did not list goalscorers, including none from the 1984–85 season in which Ibáñez was the top goalscorer in the league. The true number will likely be at least twice this figure, if not many more.)) |

International career
| 1983–1984 | Spain | 2 | (1) |
| 1986 | Catalonia | | |
- * Club domestic league appearances and goals

Emilia María Ibáñez Fernández (born 3 June 1965) is a Spanish former footballer who played as a forward for Barcelona and the Catalonia and Spain national teams.

Ibáñez joined Barcelona in 1979, playing as the club's number 9 in the Women's Catalan Football League (Lliga catalana) and Copa Generalitat, which they won in 1985: Ibáñez scored the only goal of the final. In that season and the next, she was Barcelona's top scorer in the Lliga catalana.

== Barcelona career ==
Emilia "Emi" Ibáñez played for Barcelona when it was officially known as, first, Peña Femenina Barcelona and, later, Club Femení Barcelona. She was a centre forward.

The 1984–85 season was played in two phases, both in a league format. Barcelona topped the league table in their group to enter the final phase competing for the title, with Ibáñez finishing as the tournament's top goalscorer in both phases and overall. Ibáñez was vital when Barcelona won their first official silverware, the 1985 Copa Generalitat. She scored the only goal of the final against Vallès Occidental, a headed rebound in the 30th minute that she scored after initially shooting and hitting the crossbar.

Barcelona finished the 1985–86 season placing fourth in the Lliga catalana, and with Ibáñez having scored 40 goals to finish as their top scorer and the second highest scorer in the league. On 4 January 1986, Ibáñez had been sent off during the Derbi Femení match (against Espanyol), as was an Espanyol player, as the two teams hard fought a well-deserved 1–1 draw. In the 1986 Copa Generalitat, Ibáñez scored a hat-trick in the away leg of their semi-final against Sabadell in June, with Barcelona advancing to the final 9–3 on aggregate. The final against Athenas went to penalties; though Ibáñez converted hers, Barcelona lost the shoot-out 3–4.

In the 1986–87 season, Ibáñez helped keep Barcelona in the title race, scoring the winning goal in their spectacular 4–3 comeback victory over San Adrián at the halfway point of the league. In 2023, Ibáñez became a member of the Barcelona Players' Association.

== International career ==
She was called up to training as part of the first official Spain squad in January 1983 as a last-minute replacement. After not being called to their first match, she came on in the 53rd minute as a substitute in the second, a 0–0 draw to Switzerland on 30 March 1983. She was again in training camps in November 1983 and February 1984 before coming on as a substitute for another substitute in the 55th minute of Spain's fourth match, a friendly against France on 17 March 1984. In this match she scored Spain's second ever official goal, from a dead ball inside the area after a France defensive error, in the 64th minute, tying the game at 2–2. Considering France's more extensive history in women's football, the result was considered a real success for Spain's development. Ibáñez was again present with the Spain team in May 1984.

Having scored (for Barcelona) against the Catalonia national team in training friendlies in May 1983 and 1985, Ibáñez was called to training with the Catalan team in February 1986.

=== International goals ===
Scores and results list Spain's goal tally first, score column indicates score after each Ibáñez goal.

| No. | Date | Venue | Opponent | Score | Result | Competition |
|---|---|---|---|---|---|---|
| 1. | 17 March 1984 | Mini Estadi, Barcelona, Spain | France | 2–2 | 2–2 | Friendly |

== Honours ==
Barcelona

- Copa Generalitat: 1985; runner-up 1984, 1986
