= Manuel Carrasco Formiguera =

Spanish lawyer (1890–1938)

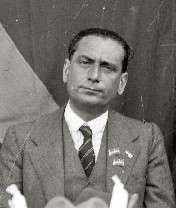
- Carrasco in 1933
- Born: 3 April 1890; Barcelona, Spain
- Died: 9 April 1938 (aged 48); Burgos, Spain
- Cause of death: Execution by firing squad
- Burial place: Montjuïc Cemetery
- Education: University of Barcelona
- Occupations: Lawyer; politician; professor
- Political party: Catalan Republican Action (1931–1932); Democratic Union of Catalonia (1932–1938)
- Children: Raimon Carrasco; Rosa Maria Carrasco i Azemar

Manuel Carrasco i Formiguera (3 April 1890 – 9 April 1938), was a Spanish lawyer and Christian democrat Catalan nationalist politician. His execution, by order of Francisco Franco, provoked protests from Catholic journalists such as Joseph Ageorges, the President of the International Federation of Catholic Journalists. Ageorges wrote, "Even more than the death of the Duke of Enghien stained the memory of Napoleon, the death of Carrasco has stained the reputation of Franco". Such protests, in turn, provoked the anger of the Francoist press. His funeral in Paris on 27 April 1938 was attended by many notable people, including Joan Miró, Ossorio y Gallardo, Josep M. de Sagarra, Joaquim Ventalló and Jacques Maritain and his wife Raissa.

== Early life ==
Manuel Carrasco i Formiguera was born in Barcelona on 3 April 1890. In 1912, while studying for his doctorate in law at the Faculty of Law of the Complutense University of Madrid, he joined the Asociación Católica Nacional de Jóvenes Propagandistas (National Catholic Association of Propagandist Youth), which Angel Ayala had founded in 1909. As a member of the Joventut Nacionalista of the Lliga Regionalista he was elected councillor to Barcelona City Hall in 1920 as an independent in a register of the Lliga. In 1922 he participated in the founding of Acció Catalana, and in that year created L'Estevet, a nationalist weekly newspaper. Carrasco's nationalism caused him to be brought to trial several times, and caricatures that appeared in the humorous weekly L'Estevet, criticizing the conduct of the Spanish Army in the Spanish protectorate in Morocco, resulted in his being sentenced to six months imprisonment. He should have been legally entitled to a conditional release, the sentence was a light one, and this was his first offence, but the advent of the dictatorship of Miguel Primo de Rivera, 2nd Marquis of Estella, caused him to serve his sentence under the harshest conditions in Burgos. Carrasco was noted for his strong nationalism but also for his rejection of all forms of violence and for his faith in the course of the law, a position that separated him from others with the same objectives he had, who nevertheless prepared for armed struggle, such as Francesc Macià, founder of Estat Català.

== Second Spanish Republic ==
In 1930, Carrasco was one of the signatories of the Pact of San Sebastian representing Accio Catalana. After the proclamation of the Republic in 1931, he was appointed Minister of Health and Welfare in the first government of the Generalitat, led by Francesc Macià. Some months later, on 28 June 1931, he was elected on a register of Accio Catalana, as a Deputy for Girona to the Constituent Cortes of the Republic, where he stressed his defense of the integrity of the Statute of Núria and religious freedom (strongly supporting the Catholic Church and religious orders and congregations). When it was said that the Jesuit colleges educated only the sons of the rich, Carrasco responded that when his father died and his family became impoverished, he was able to study for the bachillerato nevertheless, thanks to a grant from a college of the Company of Jesus. In 1932 he was expelled from Acció Catalana with other members of the Catholic sector and joined the Unió Democrática de Catalunya (Democratic Union of Catalonia), which had been created shortly before. He soon emerged as one of the major party leaders, ascending to its Governance Committee in 1933.

== Spanish Civil War ==
At the start of the Spanish Civil War in 1936, Carrasco remained loyal to the Republic. His mediation saved the lives of many who were being persecuted. These acts caused him to be the target of denunciations by journalists and being harassed by some factions of the anarchists and communists in Catalonia on the Republican side. Until December 1936 he worked in the Conselleria de Finances (the Catalan finance ministry), but on 17 December the anarchist newspaper Solidaridad Obrera printed a denunciation of him. This situation forced him to move to the Basque Country, where he collaborated with the government of lehendakari José Antonio Aguirre. At the end of his first mission in Bilbao he returned to Barcelona where he learned that there were still those there who sought his death. He then decided to leave again, as a representative of the Catalan Generalitat with the Government of Euskadi, with his family, and embarked at Bayonne on board the Galdames, set for Bilbao. Carrasco was an admirer of the Basques who had proved capable of protecting the Church and avoiding religious persecution. However, the freighter on which he was sailing was intercepted by the Francoist cruiser Canarias (Battle of Cape Machichaco) and Carrasco was taken to Pasajes, where his family was broken up. The two older daughters, Nuria and Merce, were jailed in San Sebastián, and three younger children Ramon, Josep and Neus, shut up in the asylum of San Jose, in the same city, where, as the children of 'Reds', the nuns forbade them communion. Carrasco, his wife Pilar Azemar de Carrasco, and Rosa Maria, only a few months old, were taken to Burgos. In the middle of August 1937, through the mediation of the International Red Cross, the family of Carrasco i Formiguera were exchanged for the family of General Lopez-Pinto Berizo, Captain General or the commander of the Organic Division of Burgos, and were able to move to Paris. Carrasco was transferred to the Provincial Prison in Burgos and sentenced to death in a summary trial held on 28 August 1937 for the crime of "joining the rebellion"- meaning the rebellion against Franco. Cardinal Francisco Vidal y Barraquer appealed for intervention and on 10 November 1937 wrote to Cardinal Pacelli declaring Carrasco " a practising Catholic" who "always defended the rights of the Church." Pacelli replied that he had made a petition on 15 March 1937, shortly after Carrasco's capture, and again on 30 October. All attempts to have the sentence commuted, or to include Carrasco in an exchange of prisoners, failed. Franco set an excessively high price for saving Carrasco, -a proposal relayed to the Republican ambassador in Brussels on 5 April mentioned that Carrasco would be exchanged for ten of our officers or twenty un-named ones,- while "the Republican government, although it would have wished to save him, saw him as fundamentally a Republican, but of the opposition."

== Death ==
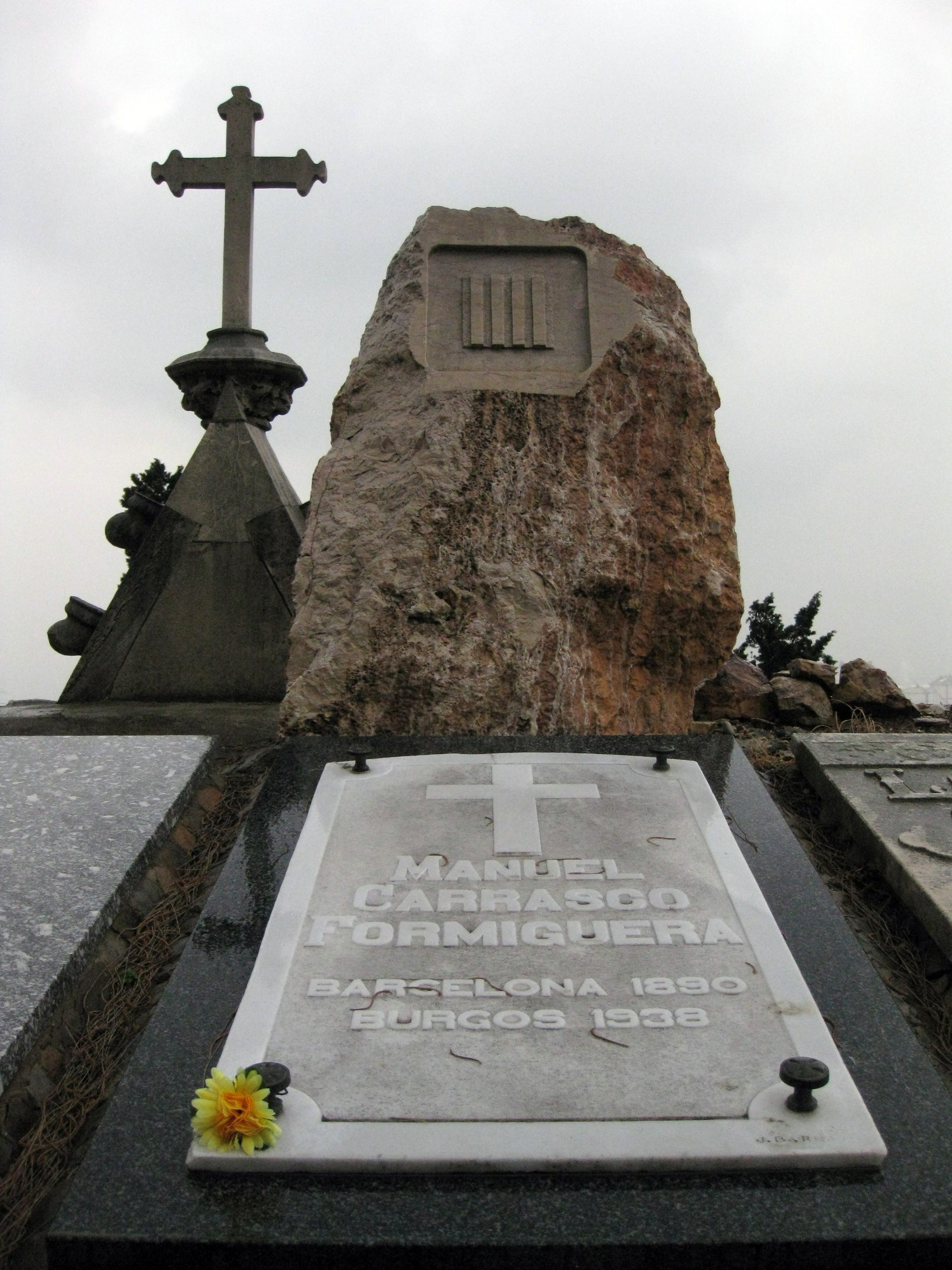
Manuel Carrasco Formiguera's grave in the Montjuïc Cemetery.

The execution of the sentence was delayed eight months and took place on 9 April 1938, in Burgos, despite the efforts of the Vatican. Franco having signed his enterado (certifying his approval), official notification of the enterado was delayed until dusk, perhaps to leave no time for last pleas for clemency. Carrasco was accompanied in his final hours by Father Ignacio Romana, an intimate friend since they had been fellow pupils in infant school, then at the bachillerato of the Jesuits college in the calle Caspe, and after that at the Faculty of Law of Barcelona University. The Jesuit Fr Romana urged Carrasco to renounce his Catalanism, adhere to Franco, and so save his life, but Carrasco refused. He wrote two letters, one to his wife Pilar, and another to the President of the Generalitat de Catalunya, Lluís Companys, asking that his execution not become a pretext for reprisals. Carrasco asked further that his diary be handed over to his wife. The judge of the Court of Executions, Sub-Lieutenant Aranaz, gave his word that he would send both the letter and the diary to his wife. He did not do this. When Fr Romana and Carrasco reached the ditch outside the prison, the place selected being sunken, shaped to make harmless a misdirected bullet, Carrasco walked towards the place where he was to be shot carrying in one hand a crucifix with a plenary indulgence for the hour of death, and in the other, a woollen shoe of his baby daughter Rosa Maria. As soon as he was finally placed in position he gave the little shoe to Father Ignacio and they embraced. Carrasco, who had declined a bandage over his eyes, declared: "The motto that has been mine for my whole life and which I carry in my heart, I now wish to shout aloud at this transcendental moment, Visca Catalunya lliure! "(Long Live free Catalonia!). He still had time to add 'Jesus, Jesus!' as the officer shouted 'Fire!' He fell backwards, shot in the head. A coup de grâce was not needed. According to various authors, Carrasco's execution was personally ordered by Franco, in response to the protests of several foreign governments, including the Vatican, against Franco's aerial bombing of civilian targets, and particularly the Italian air raids on Barcelona during 17–20 March 1938, publicly condemned by the Holy See through an informal note published on 24 March in L'Osservatore Romano.

On 25 September 2005 the Spanish Congress of Deputies agreed on a proposal from Convergence and Union, to nullify the court martial that Carrasco had been subjected to.

== Bibliography ==
- Julía, Santos; Casanova, Julián; Solé i Sabaté, Josep Maria; Villarroya, Juan; Moreno, Francisco. Víctimas de la guerra civil. Editorial Temas de Hoy. Madrid. 2006. ISBN 84-8460-476-4
- Preston, Paul. El holocausto español. Odio y exterminio en la guerra civil y despues. Debate. Barcelona. 2011. ISBN 978-84-8306-852-6

== External sources ==
- Carrasco i Formiguera: la defensa de la fe y del país hasta la muerte no conoce ideologías políticas, en catholic.net
- Diario de sesiones del Congreso de los Diputados de 27 de septiembre de 2005, en la que se debatió y aprobó la proposición no de ley de CiU para la anulación del consejo de guerra en el que se condenó a Carrasco i Formiguera.
