= 1989–90 Club Femení Barcelona season =

Club Femení Barcelona
1988–89 season
- Chairman: Josep Lluís Núñez
- Manager: Ramón Carrión until April 1990; Luis de la Pena from May 1990
- Stadium: Zona Esportiva del FC Barcelona
- Liga Nacional: 5th
- Copa de la Reina: Withdrawn
Home colours	Away colours

The 1989–90 season was the second for Club Femení Barcelona.

== Events ==
Barcelona played in the 1989–90 Liga Nacional de Fútbol Femenino, coming fifth. After some disappointing results during the season, the team changed head coach ahead of matchday 18, with Luis de la Pena replacing Ramón Carrión.

As in the previous season, they chose not to play in the Copa de la Reina.

== Players ==
Among the players were Kety Pulido, Àfrica Ocaña Fernández, Guadalupe Villar, Montse Vidal, Gemma Homar, Montse Sánchez, Olga Huertas, Sagrario Serrano, and Esther and Ariana.

== Liga Nacional ==
24 September 1989 1	La Chimenea	2–4	Barcelona	Madrid

1 October 1989 2	Barcelona	8–2	Puente Castro	Barcelona
				Stadium: Zona Esportiva del FC Barcelona

8 October 1989 3	Sabadell	3–2	Barcelona	Sabadell

22 October 1989 4	Barcelona	4–1	Complutense	Barcelona
				Stadium: Zona Esportiva del FC Barcelona

29 October 1989 5	Barcelona	2–3	Villa de Madrid	Barcelona
				Stadium: Zona Esportiva del FC Barcelona

12 November 1989 6	Oroquieta Villaverde	1–1	Barcelona	Madrid

19 November 1989 7	Barcelona	2–4	Olímpico Fortuna	Barcelona
				Stadium: Zona Esportiva del FC Barcelona

7 January 1990 8	Publi Sport	1–1	Barcelona	Valencia

14 January 1990 9	Barcelona	3–0	Parque Alcobendas	Barcelona
				Stadium: Zona Esportiva del FC Barcelona

21 January 1990 10	Peña Barcilona	1–0	Barcelona	Barcelona

4 February 1990 11	Barcelona	2–5	Espanyol	Barcelona
				Stadium: Zona Esportiva del FC Barcelona

18 March 1990 12	Barcelona	0–3	La Chimenea	Barcelona
				Stadium: Zona Esportiva del FC Barcelona

25 March 1990 13	Puente Castro	1–2	Barcelona	León

1 April 1990 14	Barcelona	1–1	Sabadell	Barcelona
				Stadium: Zona Esportiva del FC Barcelona

15 April 1990 15	Complutense	?–?	Barcelona	Madrid
Note: All but one of the games on matchday 15 were postponed, to unknown effect.

22 April 1990 16	Villa de Madrid	2–1	Barcelona	Majadahonda

29 April 1990 17	Barcelona	3–1	Oroquieta Villaverde	Barcelona
				Stadium: Zona Esportiva del FC Barcelona

6 May 1990 18	Olímpico Fortuna	1–3	Barcelona	Madrid

13 May 1990 19	Barcelona	3–1	Publi Sport	Barcelona
				Stadium: Zona Esportiva del FC Barcelona

20 May 1990 20	Parque Alcobendas	0–4	Barcelona	Alcobendas

27 May 1990 21	Barcelona	2–3	Peña Barcilona	Barcelona
				Stadium: Zona Esportiva del FC Barcelona

3 June 1990 22	Espanyol	3–1	Barcelona	Barcelona

Source: Futbolme
