= Club Femení Barcelona in the Lliga catalana =

Club Femení Barcelona participated in the Lliga catalana de futbol femenina – the Women's Catalan Football League – from 1981 until the creation of the Liga Nacional in 1988, achieving strong results without ever winning the league. Barcelona also contested the Copa Generalitat, a direct predecessor of the Copa Catalunya and which was commonly known as the Copa Catalana, winning it once in 1985 and being runner-up twice. Outside of official competition, Barcelona regularly played friendlies against derbi femení rivals Espanyol, as well as the Catalan women's national team.

Previous Catalonia-based leagues and cups in which Barcelona had participated were not related to the FEF-sanctioned Lliga catalana and Copa Generalitat.

== Overview ==
The Spanish Football Federation (the FEF at the time) formally recognised women's football in 1980, a decade after the FC Barcelona women's team was started and longer since women's football had started becoming popular in Catalonia. In 1981, a women's football department of the Catalan Football Federation (FCF) created the Lliga catalana de futbol femenina (Women's Catalan Football League), one of several region-based top-flight women's leagues operating in Spain in the 1980s, a Spain-wide system prompted on the initiative of the FCF. Barcelona was a founding member of the Lliga catalana. Team president María Teresa Andreu suggested they change the name to Club Femenino/Femení (CF) Barcelona, to be closer to the name of the men's team, with this change made official before the 1983 Copa de la Reina de Fútbol, during the 1982–83 season; they were still sometimes known by former name Penya Femenina (P.F.) Barcelona later in the decade.

Between 1983 and 1988, the top teams in each regional league went on to compete against each other for the Copa de la Reina de Fútbol and be declared Spanish champions. In effect, the regional leagues were all secondary to the Copa de la Reina, however there was no promotion or relegation in the Lliga catalana format, despite sometimes using a group and tier system. Due to Barcelona's lack of top placements in the league, they did not participate in the Copa de la Reina during this period.

Ahead of the first official Copa de la Reina, in 1983, the relationship between FC Barcelona and its women's team was reported on as poor, with the parent club "not wanting to know" when it came to them, and PF Barcelona not being recognised as an official section of the club. They were one of six teams in the league (of fourteen) that did not have fixed training facilities or schedules. In 1984, FC Barcelona was thanked for taking a much more sustained interest in women's football, offering its stadiums (including the Camp Nou) and facilities. Since at least 1985, the team played most home games at the Mini Estadi.

In 1981, sisters and Barcelona players Francina and Vicenta Pubill i Font left the club due to internal differences with how it was being run, and founded the similarly named Penya Barcelonista Barcilona. PB Barcilona took on a commercial sponsor and enjoyed a period of dominance in the 1980s, winning numerous titles in various competitions, though it was consistently expected that PB Barcilona and Barcelona both would dominate the Lliga catalana and be the teams to beat. Other top Catalan teams at the time were derbi femení rivals Espanyol and another independent team, Vallès Occidental. Despite their strong results, Barcelona never won the league.

The unified Spanish league was created in September 1988, leading to a reduction in teams remaining in the now-secondary Lliga catalana. In the 1988–89 season, when Barcelona began playing in the Liga Nacional, they fielded a subsidiary team called Barcelona Atlétic in the Lliga catalana.

== 1981 ==
The first Lliga catalana ran from 15 February to 24 May 1981.

| 5 April 1981 | Ciudad Condal | 3–3 | P.F. Barcelona |
| | | Report |
Note: At this point in the Campeonato de Cataluña, Barcelona was first in the league with 7 played, 5 wins, 1 draw, 1 loss, 25 goals, 9 conceded, and 11 points

| 12 April 1981 | P.F. Barcelona | 2–2 | Español | Barcelona |
| 12:00 | | | | Stadium: Instalaciones Deportivas del F.C. Barcelona |
Note: In the "Campeonato Provincial Femenino"

| 25/26 April 1981 | San Adrián | 5–1 | Barcelona |
| | | Report |

== 1981–82 ==
Inscriptions for the 1981–82 league were due by 25 September 1981.

== 1982–83 ==
- Manager: Núria Llansà

The league began on 10 October 1982, with matches set to be played on Sundays.

Barcelona players Juani Escamilla, Emilia Ibáñez and Montse Bonachera were called up to the Spain women's national football team in January 1983. Ibáñez and Bonachera played in a 0–0 draw against Switzerland in March 1983.

=== 1982–83 league ===
| 10 October 1982 1 | Barcelona | 12–0 | Sant Pere i Sant Pau |

| 17 October 1982 2 | Vallés Occidental | 2–1 | Barcelona |
| | | Report |

| 24 October 1982 3 | Barcelona | 0–1 | Espanyol | El Poble-sec |
| 18:00 | | Report |

| 31 October 1982 4 | Granollers | 0–8 | Barcelona |
| | | Report |

| 7 November 1982 5 | Barcelona | v | — |

| 14 November 1982 6 | — | v | Barcelona |
| | | Report |
Note: No Barcelona match listed for matchday 6

| 21 November 1982 7 | P.F. Barcelona | v | P.B. Barcilona |
| | | Report |

| 28 November 1982 | v | Barcelona |

| 5 December 1982 9 | Barcelona | v | — |
| | | Report |
Note: No Barcelona match listed for this matchday

| 12 December 1982 | Ciudad Condal | v | Barcelona |
| | | Report |

| 19 December 1982 11 | Barcelona | 1–0 | Catalunya |

| (9?) January 1983 12 | V. Congreso | 0–3 | Barcelona |
| | | Report |

| 23 January 1983 | Barcelona | v | San Adrián |
| | | Report |

| 30 January 1983 | La Mina | v | Barcelona |
| | | Report |

| 6 February 1983 | Sant Pere i St Pau | v | Barcelona |
| | | Report |

| 20 February 1983 | Espanyol | v | Barcelona |
| | | Report |

| 27 February 1983 19 | Barcelona | 4–4 | Granollers |

| 13 March 1983 | Barcelona | v | – |
| | | Report |
Note: No Barcelona match listed for this matchday

| (24?) March 1983 18 | Barcilona | 3–1 | Barcelona |
| | | Report |

| 10 April 1983 | Barcelona | v | — |
| | | Report |
Note: No Barcelona match listed for this matchday

| 17 April 1983 | Barcelona | v | Ciudad Condal |
| | | Report |

| 24 April 1983 | Catalunya | v | Barcelona |
| | | Report |

=== Friendlies ===
| 7 November 1982 Friendly | Barcelona | v | Espanyol | Tarragona |
| | | Report | | Stadium: Nou Estadi Costa Daurada |
Note: Tribute for journalist Pere Peralta

| 29 May 1983 Friendly | Selección Catalana | 3–1 | Barcelona | Barcelona |
| 10:30 | Elisabeth; Beatriz; Carmen | | Emi | Stadium: Mini Estadi |

== 1983–84 ==
- Manager: Núria Llansà, Diego Vega
- Copa Generalitat: Runner-up

Ibáñez was again called up for Spain in March 1984.

=== 1984 Copa Generalitat ===
| 14 July 1984 Copa Generalitat Final | PB Barcilona | 3–0 | CF Barcelona | Barcelona |
| 19:30 | | | | Stadium: Feliu i Codina |

== 1984–85 ==
- Director: Núria Llansà
- Manager: Agustín Miró
- League: 3rd
- Copa Generalitat: Winners
- Top goalscorer: Emilia Ibáñez

The team included: Montse Guimerà, Joana Bernabéu, Pilar Moreno, Kety Pulido, Marta Mestres, Mª Ángeles Navas, Conchi Capilla, M. Vandellòs, Montse Bonachera, Lucía Herrero, Emilia Ibáñez, Inmaculada Romero and Núria Rabanal. Ibáñez was the top goalscorer in the league for both the group and final phases. Having defeated the Catalan national team in May 1985, in a preparation friendly ahead of the Spanish championship for regional representative teams, three Barcelona defenders were called up for Catalonia later that month: Navas, Pulido and Herrero.

=== 1984–85 Lliga catalana ===
In this season, the league was held in two phases: in the first phase, two groups each played in an eight-team league, with the best-placed teams from each competing in the six-team final phase. Barcelona had to play two matches after the final matchday of the league's final phase, when they were already guaranteed third overall. The league was reported as a "fight to the death" between Barcelona and PB Barcilona, who had each won their groups unbeaten, with Barcelona's away loss to PB Barcilona the turning point.

League result summary
| Group II | | | | | | | | | Final phase | | | | | | | | |
| Pld | W | D | L | GF | GA | GD | Pts | Pos | Pld | W | D | L | GF | GA | GD | Pts | Pos |
|---|---|---|---|---|---|---|---|---|---|---|---|---|---|---|---|---|---|
| 14 | 12 | 2 | 0 | 121 | 12 | +109 | 26 | 1st | 10 | 4 | 3 | 3 | 23 | 22 | +1 | 11 | 3rd |

==== Group phase (1984) ====
| (1 October?) 1984 Group II | Cosmos | v | Barcelona |

| (7?) October 1984 Group II | C.F. Barcelona | 22–0 | Pla d'en Boet |
| | | Report |

| (14?) October 1984 Group II | Balaguer | 0–14 | F.C. Barcelona |
| | | Report |

| (21?) October 1984 Group II | Barcelona | 9–1 | San Adrià |
| | | Report |

| (28?) October 1984 Group II | Barcelona | 6–1 | Sabadell |
| | | Report |

| (3?) November 1984 Group II | Catalunya | v | Barcelona |

| (11?) November 1984 Group II | Barcelona | 3–0 | Athenas |
| | | Report |

| (17?) November 1984 Group II | Barcelona | 11–0 | Cosmos |
| | | Report |

| (25?) November 1984 Group II | Pla d'en Boet | 0–22 | Barcelona |
| | | Report |

| (2?) December 1984 Group II | Barcelona | 16–0 | Balaguer |
| | | Report |

| (9?) December 1984 Group II | Sant Adrià | 3–3 | Barcelona |
| | | Report |

| (16?) December 1984 Group II | Sabadell | 0–2 | Barcelona |
| | | Report |

| (23?) December 1984 Group II – 13 | Barcelona | 4–2 | Catalunya |
| | | Report |

| 30 December 1984 Group II – 14 | Athenas | 2–4 | Barcelona |
| | | Report |

==== Final phase (1985) ====
| 20 January 1985 Play-offs – 2 | Barcelona | 3–2 | Vallés Occidental |

| (27?) January 1985 Play-offs – 3 | Barcelona | v | Espanyol |
| | | Report |

| 3 February 1985 Play-offs – 4 | P.B. Barcilona | 3–1 | F.C. Barcelona |
| | | Report |

| 10 February 1985 Play-offs – 5 | Barcelona | 4–2 | Sant Adrià |
| | | Report |

| 17 February 1985 Play-offs – 6 | Barcelona | 2–4 | Catalunya |
| | | Report |

| February 1985 Play-offs – 7 | Vallés Occidental | v | Barcelona |
| | | Report |

| March 1985 Play-offs – 9 | C.F. Barcelona | v | P.B. Barcilona |

| March 1985 Play-offs – 10 | Sant Adrià | v | Barcelona |

| 24/31 March 1985 Play-offs – 1 | Catalunya | v | Barcelona |
| | | Report |
Note: Originally scheduled as the first matchday on 13 January.

| 31 March 1985 Play-offs – 8 | Espanyol | 4–4 | Barcelona |
Note: Originally scheduled for 3 March.

=== 1985 Copa Generalitat ===
| 14 April 1985 Copa Generalitat Round of 16 – Leg 1 | Balaguer | 1–12 | Barcelona | Balaguer |
| 16:30 |

| 20 April 1985 Copa Generalitat Round of 16 – Leg 2 | Barcelona | 0–1 | Balaguer | Barcelona |
| 19:30 | | | | Stadium: Zona Deportiva |
Note: Barcelona advance 12–2 on aggregate

| 27 April 1985 Copa Generalitat Quarterfinal – Leg 1 | Barcelona | 3–2 | Sabadell | Barcelona |
| 19:30 | | | | Stadium: Zona Deportiva |

| 5 May 1985 Copa Generalitat Quarterfinal – Leg 2 | Sabadell | v | Barcelona | Sabadell |
| 13:00 | | | | Stadium: Camp Marinals |
Note: Barcelona advance

| Copa Generalitat Semifinal – Leg 1 | P.B. Barcilona | 2–2 | Barcelona |
| | | Report |

| 27 May 1985 Copa Generalitat Semifinal – Leg 2 | Barcelona | v | Barcilona |
| 12:00 |
Note: CF Barcelona advance after penalties.

| 29 June 1985 Copa Generalitat Final | Barcelona | 1–0 | Vallès Occidental | Badalona |
| 19:00 | Emilia Ibáñez 30'; Kety Pulido (yellow card); Ma. A. Navas (yellow card) | | | Referee: Sr. Esquerdo |

=== Friendlies ===
| 26 December 1984 Friendly | Barcelona | 1–0 | Espanyol |
| | | Report |

| 1 May 1985 Friendly | Selección Catalana | 1–2 | Barcelona | Sallent |
| | Reyes | | Nuria Pascual; Emilia Ibáñez | Attendance: 800 |

== 1985–86 ==
- Director: Núria Llansà
- League: 4th
- Copa Generalitat: Runner-up
- Top goalscorer: Emilia Ibáñez (40)

The team included: Esther I, Marta Mestres, Kety, Luci, Maruja, Esther II, Inés, Emilia Ibáñez, Navas (captain), Silvia, Patri, Inma I, Inma II, Nuri and Lourdes. Players including Pulido, Navas, Mestre and Ibáñez were called up to either the first or second Catalan XIs during the season.

=== 1985–86 Lliga catalana ===
In the league, PB Barcilona had proposed using the two group format again, but this was rejected by the rest of the clubs.

League result summary
| Pld | W | D | L | GF | GA | GD | Pts | Pos |
|---|---|---|---|---|---|---|---|---|
| 24 | 14 | 5 | 5 | 111 | 29 | +82 | 33 | 4th |

| 22 September 1985 1 | Barcelona | 1–1 | Cosmos |
| | Nuria Rabanal | | Ana |

| 29 September 1985 2 | Espanyol | 2–1 | Barcelona | Instalaciones Seat |

| (6?) October 1985 3 | Barcelona | 1–4 | San Adrián |
| | | Report |

| (13?) October 1985 4 | Llefià | 0–1 | Barcelona |
| | | Report |

| (20?) October 1985 5 | Barcelona | 0–2 | Athenas | Barcelona |
| 10:00 | | | | Stadium: Mini Estadi |

| 26 October 1985 6 | Argentona | 0–10 | Barcelona | Argentona |
| 16:00 |

| 3 November 1985 7 | Barcelona | 4–1 | Catalunya | Barcelona |
| 10:00 | | | | Stadium: Mini Estadi |

| 10 November 1985 8 | Vallés Occidental | v | Barcelona | Sabadell |
| 12:00 | | Report | | Stadium: Lepanto |

| (17?) November 1985 9 | Barcelona | 3–3 | Sabadell | Barcelona |
| | | Report | | Stadium: Mini Estadi |

| (24?) November 1985 10 | Balaguer | 1–7 | Barcelona |
| | | Report |

| 1 December 1985 11 | Barcelona | bye | — |
| | | Report |
Note: Due to the odd number of teams in the league, rest days were used.

| 7 December 1985 12 | Barcelona | 30–0 | Bemen 3 | Barcelona |
| 18:30 | | | | Stadium: Mini Estadi |

| 15 December 1985 13 | P.B. Barcilona | 1–1 | Barcelona | Molins de Rei |
| 15:45 | | | | Stadium: Incresa |

| 29 December 1985 14 | Cosmos | 0–1 | Barcelona | Barcelona |
| 12:00 | | | | Stadium: Maresma |

| 4 January 1986 15 | Barcelona | 1–1 | Espanyol | Barcelona |
| 19:00 | Ma. Angeles Navas 63'; Emilia Ibáñez (red card) | | Kety Pulido 15' (o.g.); N. Sala (red card) | Stadium: Mini Estadi; Referee: Cuenca Ordóñez |

| 12 January 1986 16 | San Adrián | 1–2 | Barcelona | Barcelona |
| 19:00 | ? (yellow card); A. Belmonte (pen.); ? (red card); ? (red card); ? (red card) | | Ma. A. Navas (pen.); ? (yellow card); ? (red card) | Stadium: San Gabriel; Referee: Rafael Alcaraz Sapiña |
Note: The game was ended two minutes early (in the 78th minute), due to a pitch invasion that led to incidents involving players. By the end, four players had been sent off and another four shown yellow cards. The league arbitration decided that the result would stand.

| 18 January 1986 17 | Barcelona | 5–1 | Llefià | Barcelona |
| 19:00 | | | | Stadium: Mini Estadi |

| 26 January 1986 18 | Athenas | 1–1 | Barcelona | Can Caralieu |
| 14:00 |

| 1 February 1986 19 | Barcelona | 15–0 | Argentona | Barcelona |
| | | | | Stadium: Mini Estadi |

| 8 February 1986 20 | Catalunya | 3–1 | Barcelona | Sant Adrià de Besòs |
| 18:00 | | | | Stadium: Marina |

| 15 February 1986 21 | Barcelona | 2–1 | Vallés Occidental | Barcelona |
| 19:00 | | | | Stadium: Mini Estadi |

| 2 March 1986 22 | Sabadell | 3–4 | Barcelona | Sabadell |
| 13:15 | | | | Stadium: Marinales Herraona |

| 9 March 1986 23 | Barcelona | v | Balaguer | Barcelona |
| 10:30 |

| 16 March 1986 24 | — | bye | Barcelona |
| | | Report |
Note: Due to the odd number of teams in the league, rest days were used.

| 23 March 1986 25 | Bemen 3 | 0–14 | Barcelona | Barcelona |
| 12:00 | | | | Stadium: Pitch 4, H. Mundet |

| 13 April 1986 26 | Barcelona | 1–0 | PB Barcilona | Barcelona |
| 12:00 | | | | Stadium: Mini Estadi |
Note: Scheduled for the weekend of the 6 April 1986, it was postponed at the request of PB Barcilona, who had two players called up to the Spanish team

=== 1986 Copa Generalitat ===
| 19 April 1986 Round of 16 — Leg 1 | Espanyol | 0–0 | Barcelona | Barcelona |
| 20:30 | | | | Stadium: Instalaciones Seat |

| 1 May 1986 Round of 16 — Leg 2 | Barcelona | 2–1 | Espanyol | Barcelona |
| 12:00 |
Note: Barcelona advance 2–1 on aggregate

| 11 May 1986 Quarterfinal – Leg 1 | Vallés Occidental | 2–2 | Barcelona |

| 25 May 1986 Quarterfinal – Leg 2 | Barcelona | 1–1 | Vallés Occidental |
| | | Report |
Note: Barcelona advance on penalties

| 15 June 1986 Semifinal – Leg 1 | Barcelona | 2–2 | Sabadell | Barcelona |
| 10:00 | | | | Stadium: Mini Estadi |

| (21?) June 1986 Semifinal – Leg 2 | Sabadell | 1–7 | Barcelona |
| | Ma. A. Parejo | Report | Emilia Ibáñez; Ma. A. Navas; I. Romero; ? (o.g.) | Referee: Sr. Inglés |
Note: Barcelona advance 9–3 on aggregate

| 5 July 1986 Copa Generalitat Final | Barcelona | 1–1 (3–4 p) | FF Athenas | Barcelona |
| 18:00 | Nuri 27'; Marta (yellow card); Luci (yellow card) | | Ana 80'; Montse (yellow card) | Stadium: Feliu i Codina |
| | Penalties |
| | Marta Mestres (penalty scored); Emilia Ibáñez (penalty scored); Lourdes (penalty scored) | | (penalty scored) Luisa; (penalty scored) Paqui; (penalty scored) Conchi; (penalty scored) Silvia |
Note: FF Athenas win on penalties.

=== Friendlies ===
| 1 November 1985 Friendly | Selección Catalana | 3–0 | Barcelona | Barcelona |
| 12:00 | R. Oller 55' (pen.); Ma. A. Parejo 59', 76' | | | Stadium: Feliu i Codina |
Note: Two Barcelona defenders – K. Pulido and Ma. Navas – played for the Catalan team

| 26 December 1985 Friendly | Espanyol | 1–1 (5–4 p) | Barcelona | Barcelona |
| 12:00 | | | | Stadium: Feliu i Codina |
Note: Traditional derbi femení Christmas friendly

== 1986–87 ==
- Director: Núria Llansà
- League: 4th
- Copa Generalitat: Semifinals

At some point after the previous season, Kety Pulido left Barcelona and joined San Roque; at the start of January it was noted that Barcelona (then fifth in the league) had started the season with a much-changed line-up that was still developing, looking more and more integrated with each matchday. In January, Ma. A. Navas and Marta Mestres were called up to the Catalan team; Mestres was again in April, while Navas had been involved in a serious moto accident several months previously.

=== 1986–87 Lliga catalana ===
League result summary (Note: Contemporaneous results tables, including the final summary, show Barcelona lost three matches. Individual contemporaneous match results would suggest they lost five; 18 won, 5 drawn, 3 lost does not add up to 28 played.)
| Pld | W | D | L | GF | GA | GD | Pts | Pos |
|---|---|---|---|---|---|---|---|---|
| 28 | 18 | 5 | 3 | 138 | 31 | +107 | 41 | 4th |

| 13 September 1986 1 | Barcelona | 2–3 | Espanyol |
| | Isabel 8'; Silvia 51' | Report | Maruja 18' (o.g.); Mayte 50', 54' |

| (20?) September 1986 2 | Catalunya | 0–5 | Barcelona |
| | | Report |

| 27 September 1986 3 | Barcelona | v | Badalona F. Angeles |
| 18:00 | | Report |

| 4 October 1986 4 | Balaguer | 0–6 | Barcelona |
| | | Report |

| 11 October 1986 5 | Barcelona | v | Sabadell | Barcelona |
| 17:00 | | Report | | Stadium: Mini Estadi |

| 18 October 1986 6 | Barcelona | 7–0 | Joventut Hortense | Barcelona |
| | | Report |

| 26 October 1986 7 | Barcelona | v | Athenas | Barcelona |
| 10:00 | | Report |

| (2?) November 1986 8 | San Roque | v | Barcelona |

| 9 November 1986 9 | Barcelona | 0–2 | P.B. Barcilona | Barcelona |
| 10:00 | | | Judith Pascual; Nuri Sala | Stadium: Zona Deportiva |

| 15 November 1986 10 | Cosmos | w/o | Barcelona |
| | | Report |
Note: Walkovers were recorded as 0–1 losses for the team that forfeited; Cosmos forfeited.

| 22/23 November 1986 11 | Barcelona | bye | — |
| | | Report |
Note: Rest day.

| 29 November 1986 12 | Barcelona | 1–1 | Vallés Occidental | Barcelona |
| 19:00 | Silvia | | Ana Castaño | Stadium: Mini Estadi |

| 6 December 1986 13 | Vilanova Camí | 0–5 | Barcelona |
| | | Report |

| 13 December 1986 14 | Barcelona | 5–2 | Gracia Cal Majó | Barcelona |
| 19:00 | | | | Stadium: Mini Estadi |

| 20 December 1986 15 | San Adrián | 3–4 | Barcelona | San Gabriel |
| 8:30 | A Belmonte; Macu | | Silvia; Ma. A. Navas; Emi |

| (3?) January 1987 16 | Espanyol | 3–3 | Barcelona |
| | | Report |

| 10 January 1987 17 | Barcelona | 6–0 | Catalunya | Barcelona |
| 19:00 | | | | Stadium: Mini Estadi |

| 18 January 1987 18 | Badalona F. Anglés | 0–17 | Barcelona | Zona Deportiva Lloreda |
| 14:00 |

| (24?) January 1987 19 | Barcelona | w/o | Balaguer | Barcelona |
| | | Report | | Stadium: Mini Estadi |
Note: Walkovers were recorded as 0–1 losses for the team that forfeited; Balaguer forfeited.

| 1 February 1987 20 | Sabadell | 1–3 | Barcelona | Marinales Arrahona |
| 9:45 |

| 7 February 1987 21 | Barcelona | 10–1 | Joventut Hortense | Barcelona |
| 19:00 | | | | Stadium: Mini Estadi |

| 15 February 1987 22 | Athenas | 0–0 | Barcelona | Can Caralleu |
| 14:00 |

| 21 February 1987 23 | Barcelona | 5–0 | San Roque | Barcelona |
| 19:00 | | | | Stadium: Mini Estadi |

| 1 March 1987 24 | Barcilona | 1–0 | Barcelona | Incresa |
| 16:00 | N. Sala 75' |

| 8 March 1987 25 | Barcelona | w/o | Cosmos |
Note: Walkovers were recorded as 0–1 losses for the team that forfeited; Cosmos forfeited.

| (15?) March 1987 26 | – | bye | Barcelona |
Note: Rest day.

| (20?) March 1987 27 | Vallés Occidental | 3–1 | Barcelona |
| | | Report |

| 28 March 1987 28 | Barcelona | 6–0 | Vilanova Camí | Barcelona |
| 19:00 | | | | Stadium: Mini Estadi |

| April 1987 29 | Gràcia Cal Majó | 1–22 | Barcelona |
| | | Report |

| May 1987 30 | Barcelona | 3–3 | Sant Adrià |
| | | Report |

=== 1987 Copa Generalitat ===
| (23?) May 1987 Round of 16 – Leg 1 | Badalona F. Angeles | 0–12 | Barcelona |
| | | Report |

| (30?) May 1987 Round of 16 – Leg 2 | Barcelona | v | Badalona F. Angeles |
| | | Report |
Note: Barcelona advance

| (6?) June 1987 Quarterfinals – Leg 1 | Barcelona | 2–0 | San Adrián | Barcelona |
| | | Report |

| 13 June 1987 Quarterfinals – Leg 2 | San Adrián | v | Barcelona |
Note: Barcelona advance

| 4 July 1987 Semifinal – Leg 1 | Barcelona | 1–2 | Vallés Occidental | Barcelona |
| 19:00 | | | | Stadium: Mini Estadi |

| 8 July 1987 Semifinal – Leg 2 | Vallés Occidental | 2–0 | Barcelona | Sabadell |
| | | | | Stadium: Merinales |
Note: Vallés Occidental advance 4–1 on aggregate.

=== Friendlies ===
| 15 March 1987 Friendly | Barcelona | v | San Fructuoso V. | Barcelona |
| 10:00 | | Report | | Stadium: Zona Deportiva |

== 1987–88 ==
- Director: Núria Llansà
- League: 4th
- Copa Generalitat: Round of 16

Pulido was again playing for Barcelona by 1988; she as well as A. Pastor, Mestres, S. Roca and S. Serrano, were called up to the Catalan team in March 1988.

=== 1987–88 Lliga catalana ===
In this season, the league was held in two phases: in the first phase, two groups of eight competed, with the best-placed teams from each competing in the "play-offs" of the final phase. Reported as a novel introduction for the season, a similar system had been used a few years earlier.

The classification table for the final phase carried over the points that teams had earned in the group phase playing against other teams who entered the same final phase; in the final phase, teams only played matches against teams they had not faced in the group, with the final classification combining both.

League result summary
| Group II/B | | | | | | | | | Title play-offs | | | | | | | | Overall standings (Note: Results against same-tier play-off teams, from both phases) | | | | | | | | |
| Pld | W | D | L | GF | GA | GD | Pts | Pos | Pld | W | D | L | GF | GA | GD | Pts | Pld | W | D | L | GF | GA | GD | Pts | Pos |
|---|---|---|---|---|---|---|---|---|---|---|---|---|---|---|---|---|---|---|---|---|---|---|---|---|---|
| 13 | 9 | 2 | 2 | >46 | 11 | +35 | 20 | 3rd | 8 | 5 | 0 | 3 | 26 | 8 | +18 | 10 | 14 | 8 | 1 | 5 | 36 | 15 | +21 | 17 | 4th |

==== Group phase ====
On 11 November, Barcelona was first in the group on 10 points, despite not having played every game.

| 20 September 1987 1 | San Adrián | 1–4 | Barcelona |

| (26?) September 1987 2 | Barcelona | 3–2 | Sabadell |

| 3 | Vilanova Camí | v | Barcelona |
Note: Postponed twice due to inclement weather, ultimately not played

| (18?) October 1987 5 | Berga | 0–5 | Barcelona |
| | | Report |

| 25 October 1987 6 | Gràcia Cal Majó | 0–5 | Barcelona |
| 14:00 |

| 31 October 1987 7 | Barcelona | v | Torroella |
| 19:00 | | Report |

| 14 November 1987 8 | Barcelona | 4–1 | San Adrián |
| 19:00 |

| 21 November 1987 9 | Sabadell | 1–0 | Barcelona | Sabadell |
| 16:30 | | | | Stadium: Marinales Arrahona |

| 28 November 1987 10 | Barcelona | 8–1 | P.B. Vilanova Camí |
| 19:00 |

| (5?) December 1987 11 | Barcilona D.P. | 0–0 | Barcelona |
| | | Report |

| 8 December 1987 4 | Barcelona | 1–2 | PB Barcilona |
Note: Originally scheduled for 11 October 1987; postponed due to PB Barcilona having a player called up for Spain.

| 12 December 1987 12 | Barcelona | 11–0 | Berga |
| 19:00 |

| 20 December 1987 13 | Barcelona | 1–1 | Gracia Cal Majó |
| 10:30 |

| January 1988 14 | Toroella | 2–4 | Barcelona |
| | | Report |

==== Final phase ====
From Group II/B, Sabadell, Barcilona, Barcelona, and Toroella progressed to the title play-offs. Ahead of the final matchday, Barcelona could still achieve second place, and so qualification to the Copa de la Reina; their loss, paired with Barcilona and Espanyol (the other second-place contenders) drawing against each other, kept them in fourth position.

| January 1988 1 | Athenas | 1–4 | Barcelona |
| | | Report |

| January 1988 2 | Barcelona | 9–1 | San Roque Badalona |

| January 1988 3 | Espanyol | 1–0 | Barcelona |
| | Laura Marsá 20' |

| January/February 1988 4 | Vallés Occidental | 1–0 | Barcelona |

| 13 February 1988 5 | Barcelona | 5–1 | Athenas | Barcelona |
| 19:00 | | | | Stadium: Mini Estadi |

| 21 February 1988 6 | San Roque B | 1–4 | Barcelona | Sant Roc |
| 17:00 | | | | Stadium: Campo Municipal San Roque |

| 27 February 1988 7 | Barcelona | 3–0 | Espanyol |
| 19:00 |

| 13 March 1988 8 | Barcelona | 1–2 | Vallés Occidental | Barcelona |
| 12:00 | | | | Stadium: Mini Estadi |
Note: Postponed by a week due to players involved with the Spanish national team.

=== 1988 Copa Generalitat ===
| (9?) April 1988 Round of 16 – Leg 1 | Vallés Occidental | 3–1 | Barcelona |
| | | Report |

| 17 April 1988 Round of 16 – Leg 2 | Barcelona | 1–3 | Vallés Occidental | Barcelona |
| 11:30 | | | | Stadium: Mini Estadi |
Note: Vallés Occidental advance 6–2 on aggregate

=== Friendlies ===
| 7 February 1988 | Selección Catalana | 5–1 | Barcelona | Barcelona |
| 10:30 | | | | Stadium: Mini Estadi |

| June 1988 Friendly | Sabadell | v | Barcelona | Sabadell |
| | | Report | | Stadium: Campo Municipal Arrahona-Merinales |
Note: Part of an international friendly tournament held by Sabadell-based UD Marina for their 30th anniversary

| August 1988 Vila de Teiá Tournament | Teiá Vera Light | 2–2 | Barcelona | Maresme |
| | | Report |
Note: A match of the IV Torneo Internacional de Fútbol Femenino "Vila de Teiá", an invitational held by Teiá

| August 1988 Vila de Teiá Tournament | Sampedrotarra | 5–5 | Barcelona | Maresme |
| | | Report |
Note: A match of the IV Torneo Internacional de Fútbol Femenino "Vila de Teiá", an invitational held by Teiá
