= Núñez i Navarro Hotels =

Spanish hotel chain

- Industry: Hospitality
- Headquarters: Barcelona, Spain
- Website: www.nnhotels.com

Núñez i Navarro Hotels, also known as nnhotels, is a Spanish-based hotel chain with nine properties in Barcelona. Most of them rank on Top 20 in Barcelona by Tripadvisor.com users. The company is part of Grup Núñez i Navarro.

== Properties ==
Barcelona

- B-Hotel
- Hotel 1898
- Hotel Barcelona Universal
- Hotel Europark
- Hotel Granvia
- Hotel Jazz
- Hotel Paral·lel
- Hotel Soho Barcelona
- Hotel U232 (formerly known as Hotel Núñez-Urgell)
