= Ana Fernández (footballer) =

Spanish footballer (born 2000)

Personal information
- Full name: Ana Fernández Nieto
- Date of birth: 3 March 2000 (age 26)
- Place of birth: Madrid, Spain
- Position: Defender

Team information
- Current team: SE AEM
- Number: 16

Youth career
- 2015–2016: Atlético Madrid

Senior career*
Years	Team	Apps	(Gls)
2016–2017	Atlético Madrid C		
2017–2020	Atlético Madrid B	19+	(1+)
2020–2023	Madrid CFF B	22	(1)
2022–2023	Granadilla	27	(0)
2023–2024	Rayo Vallecano	31	(0)
2024–2025	Granadilla	10	(0)
2025–	SE AEM	14	(1)
- * Club domestic league appearances and goals as of 15:11, 26 November 2021 (UTC)

Ana Fernández Nieto (born 3 March 2000) is a Spanish footballer who plays as a defender for SE AEM.

== Club career ==
Fernández started her career at Atlético Madrid's academy.
