= Honoka Yonei =

Japanese association football player

Personal information
- Date of birth: 19 April 1999 (age 27)
- Place of birth: Chiba, Japan
- Height: 1.59 m (5 ft 3 in)
- Position: Midfielder

Team information
- Current team: SE AEM
- Number: 15

Senior career*
Years	Team	Apps	(Gls)
2017–2024	Eibar	79	(0)
2024-2025	Sporting de Huelva	26	(0)
2025-	SE AEM	30	(2)
- * Club domestic league appearances and goals

Honoka Yonei (born 19 April 1999) is a Japanese footballer, who plays for SE AEM in the Primera Federación.
