= 1977–78 P.F. Barcelona season =

Peña Femenina Barcelona
1977–78 season
- Chairman: Agustí Montal Costa; Raimon Carrasco (interim)
- Manager: Josep Gutiérrez

The 1977–78 season was the seventh year and fourth formal season in existence for P.F. Barcelona. With women's football flagging in Spain, Barcelona played against teams from other European nations.

By September 1977 there was no longer a women's league in Catalonia, with the idea of one also considered somewhat unrealistic; nevertheless, Maria Teresa Andreu said that the four women's teams in Catalonia had played against each with an aim to launch a Liga Femenina de Fútbol de Cataluña. With no formal competition, Barcelona was one of the large teams that continued playing, including against women's teams from leagues in other countries. Andreu, president of P.F. Barcelona at the time, felt that FC Barcelona respected the women's team, with the club supporting and involving them.

== Players ==
Note: Flags indicate national team as defined under FIFA eligibility rules; some limited exceptions apply. Players may hold more than one non-FIFA nationality.

No.	Pos.	Nation	Player
1		ESP	María Teresa
2		ESP	Merche
3		ESP	Suñe
4		ESP	Ganga
5		ESP	Pili
6		ESP	Juani
7		ESP	Pubill
8		ESP	Lolita (captain)
9		ESP	Gallofre

No.	Pos.	Nation	Player
10		ESP	Nobrega
11		ESP	Herminia
12		ESP	Palacios
13		ESP	Carl
14		ESP	Castro
15		ESP	Pilar
16		ESP	María Angeles
17		ESP	Carmen

== Friendlies ==
=== Gamper ===
May 1977	US Cannes La Bocca Olympique (France)	0–1	P.F. Barcelonista	Cannes
		Report
Note: Considered the 'away' leg of the women's match played at the Joan Gamper Trophy in September 1977, between the same teams.

25 September 1977	P.F. Barcelonista	4–0	(France) US Cannes La Bocca Olympique	Barcelona
	Nobrega	Report		Stadium: Fabra y Coats
Note: Played after the Joan Gamper Trophy of the Barcelona youth team. The wife of then-FC Barcelona president Agustí Montal Costa took the symbolic kick-off, with all the directors of FC Barcelona present.

=== Vilanova tournament ===
The four principal women's teams in Catalonia competed against each other in a group tournament held in Vilanova i la Geltrú. Espanyol played Catalunya and Barcelona played Sabadell, with the winners of each game to face each other.

5 June 1977 Semi-final	Barcelona	v	Sabadell	Vilanova i la Geltrú
		Report

== Menton Tournament ==
In 1978, Barcelona took part in the Menton Tournament, held from 25 to 27 March at Stade Lucien Rhein and Stade Decazes. They lost all of their group matches, and proceeded to the play-off for ninth place, which they won.

March 1978 Group B	Lombardia (Italy)	1–0	(Spain) Barcelona	Menton
		Report

March 1978 Group B	Étoile Menton (France)	2–1	(Spain) Barcelona	Menton
		Report

March 1978 Group B	Landhaus (Austria)	1–0	(Spain) Barcelona	Menton
		Report

March 1978 Group B	Nord-Est France	1–0	(Spain) Barcelona	Menton
		Report

March 1978 Ninth place play-off	Barcelona (Spain)	1–0	Belgium	Menton
		Report
