= List of P.F. Barcelona matches 1975–76 =

The Penya Femenina Barcelona football team played various exhibition matches in 1975 and 1976, without formal league seasons. Though the initial strength of women's football in Spain was flagging by 1975, clubs organised individual matches and tournaments.

FC Barcelona fan groups helped to organise Primavera Jove-75 ("Youth Spring '75") in Arbúcies in the spring of 1975, which saw large participation from young people in various sports and activities; a women's football match in the afternoon of 6 April was reported to be a particular highlight. By July 1975, some women's football matches competing for invitational trophies had been held in Catalonia; it is unknown if Barcelona took part.

== Matches ==
December 1975	Madrid	1–1	P.F. del F.C. Barcelona	Alcalá
		Report
Note: This and the subsequent three matches were all played against the same team, simply referred to as Madrid. The report described it as "maximum rivalry"; one large Madrid team of the time was Olímpico de Villaverde, while Atlético Madrid are based in Alcalá.

December 1975	Madrid	2–2	P.F. del F.C. Barcelona	Alcalá
		Report

7 December 1975	P.F. del F.C. Barcelona	v	Madrid	Villanueva
		Report

8 December 1975	P.F. del F.C. Barcelona	v	Madrid	Martorell
		Report
