= Alba Montserrat =

Spanish footballer (born 1984)

Personal information
- Full name: Alba Montserrat Tarín
- Date of birth: 9 June 1984 (age 42)
- Place of birth: Barcelona, Spain
- Height: 1.70 m (5 ft 7 in)
- Position: Goalkeeper

Senior career*
| Years | Team | Apps | (Gls) |
| 1995–2003 | Barcelona | | |
| 2003–2006 | Sabadell | | |
| 2006–2007 | 1º Dezembro | | |
| 2006–2007 | CF Llers | | |
| 2007–2010 | L'Estartit | | |
| 2010–2012 | RCD Espanyol | | |

International career
| 1998–2005 | Catalonia | | |
- * Club domestic league appearances and goals

Alba Montserrat Tarín (born 9 June 1984) is a Spanish former football goalkeeper, who most recently played for RCD Espanyol of Spain's Primera División.

Montserrat played her final game for Espanyol in April 2012, then emigrated to Munich for her career outside football.
