= 2023 Copa Catalunya Femenina =

The 2023 edition of the Copa Catalunya Femenina was played between June and September 2023, as part of the 2023–24 season of Spanish women's football. It was organised by the Catalan Football Federation, and was the second time it was run as an exclusively amateur competition. SE AEM won the title for the first time, with their B team, having made it to the semi-finals in both 2018 and 2019.

== Format ==
The format was that of an unequal two-sided knockout bracket as a single-elimination tournament. Eighteen teams entered, with five matches on one side of the first round draw and four on the other. The winners of one of the matches on the larger side had a bye past the second round; still with an odd number of teams, an intermittent third round was held for the team with a bye to play one of the second round winners from the larger side of the draw. The winners of this match, and the three other second round winners, directly entered the semi-finals. Prize money for the winning team was €4,400 and the three other semi-finalists received €1,100. In the elimination rounds, €165 was awarded to match-winning teams, and the same amount was given to the away team of each fixture for expenses.

Winning in the second round should have seen teams compete in the semi-finals, however, due to a number of circumstances, none of the second round winners played in a semi-final match.

== First round ==
First round
Mataró	2
SE AEM (B)	3

Guineueta	0
Seagull	3

Women's Soccer School	2(5)
La Roca Penya Blanc Blava	2(4)

Martinenc	4
Pardinyes	1

First round
Sants	1
Palautordera	3

Viladecans	3
Sant Gabriel	4

Can Parellada	1(5)
Pallejà	1(4)

Santa Susanna	7
Manu Lanzarote	1

Igualada	2
Fontsanta Fatjó	0

First round matches were all played on 18 June 2023.

	Guineueta	0–3	Seagull	La Guineueta, Barcelona
13:00	(yellow card) 45+1' (yellow card) 61' (yellow card) 69'	Report	13', 63' (pen.), 84'; (yellow card) 62'	Stadium: Centre Esportiu de La Guineueta

	Martinenc	4–1	Pardinyes	Badalona
16:00	Delba 9', 31'; Bea 43'; Abril 51'	Report	Montserrat 57'	Stadium: Estadi Municipal de Badalona
Note: Played at Badalona Sud as Martinenc's ground in Guinardó was under construction.

	Sants	1–3	Palautordera	Barcelona
16:00		Report		Stadium: Camp de Futbol de l'Energia

	Mataró	2–3	SE AEM (B)	Mataró
16:00		Report		Stadium: Estadi Los Molinos

	Can Parellada	1–1 (5–4 p)	Pallejà	Terrassa
16:00		Report		Stadium: Camp de Futbol Municipal Can Parellada

	Santa Susanna	7–1	Manu Lanzarote	Santa Susanna
17:00	21', 41', 49', 64', 68', 75', 80'; (yellow card) 28'	Report	2'; (yellow card) 42'	Stadium: Camp de futbol Santa Susanna

	Women's Soccer School	2–2 (5–4 p)	La Roca Penya Blanc Blava	La Roca del Vallès
17:00		Report		Stadium: Camp de Futbol de La Roca del Vallès

	Viladecans	3–4	Sant Gabriel	Viladecans
17:30	(yellow card) 15' (yellow card) 84'; 56', 77', 91'	Report	26', 76', 79', 85' (pen.); (yellow card) 27' (yellow card) 70' (yellow card) 72'	Stadium: Camp Viladecans

	Igualada	2–0	Fontsanta Fatjó	Igualada
19:00	8', 36'; (yellow card) 54'	Report	(yellow card) 6' (yellow card) 11'	Stadium: Estadi Les Comes

== Second round ==
Second round
SE AEM (B)	1
Seagull	0

Women's Soccer School	2
Martinenc	0

Second round
Palautordera	0
Sant Gabriel	3

Can Parellada	2
Santa Susanna	3

Igualada	bye

Second round matches were played on 21 and 22 June 2023. Due to the odd number of teams that progressed from the first round, Igualada had a bye for the second round.

The round was alternatively described as the quarter-finals plus a round of 16 game (the Can Parellada–Santa Susanna match) that would lead to a quarter-final against Igualada.

21 June 2023	SE AEM (B)	1–0	Seagull	Lleida
19:45		Report		Stadium: Camp de Futbol Municipal de Recasens

21 June 2023	Palautordera	0–3	Sant Gabriel	Santa Maria de Palautordera
19:45		Report		Stadium: Camp de Futbol Municipal Font Martina

22 June 2023	Women's Soccer School	2–0	Martinenc	Barcelona
18:30		Report		Stadium: Camp de Fútbol Sant Genís

22 June 2023	Can Parellada	2–3	Santa Susanna	Terrassa
19:30		Report		Stadium: Camp de Futbol Municipal Can Parellada

== Third round ==
Third round
Santa Susanna	0
Igualada	5

One match was played in the third round, for Igualada (who had come through the second round on a bye) to earn their progression against a team that had won in the second round.

20 August 2023	Santa Susanna	0–5	Igualada	Santa Susanna
16:00	Sanz (yellow card) 60'; Soler (yellow card) 89'	Report	Bohigas 3', 63', 65'; Marina 22'; Ribas 24'	Stadium: Camp de futbol Santa Susanna; Referee: David Caro Gallardo

== Final stages ==
Semi-finals
SE AEM (B)	w/o
~~Women's Soccer School~~
Palautordera	1
Igualada	5

Final
Igualada	0
SE AEM (B)	1

=== Semi-finals ===
The semi-finals were set to be played on 27 August 2023.

Defending champions Sant Gabriel had defeated Palautordera in the second round to advance to the semi-final, but in August 2023 the entire team left the club and denounced its treatment of the women's team. Palautordera took Sant Gabriel's place in the semi-finals. Igualada, having come through their third round tie, played the lower-division Palautordera.

Due to the withdrawal of Women's Soccer School, SE AEM (B) had a bye and progressed to the final.

	Palautordera	1–5	Igualada	Santa Maria de Palautordera
19:15	Izquierdo (yellow card) 23'; Salicru 29'; Corominas (yellow card) 64'	Report	Marina 16', 41'; Martín 64', 74'; Corominas 78' (o.g.)	Stadium: Camp de Futbol Municipal Font Martina; Referee: Sandra Gonzalez Jimenez

=== Final ===
In their team photo before the final, Igualada players covered the Spanish Football Federation (RFEF) logos on their shirt sleeves in protest against the RFEF. SE AEM (B) did not wear RFEF logos on their shirts.

2 September 2023
17:00

Igualada	0 – 1	SE AEM (B)
Ribas (yellow card) 5'; M. Bosch (yellow card) 13'; Bohigas (yellow card) 40'; Tòmas (yellow card) 59'		Ari (yellow card) 43'; Aran Amorós 82'

Estadi Municipal de Santa Margarida de Montbui, Santa Margarida de Montbui
Referee: Victoria Petrova Borislavova
