= Raimon Carrasco =

Spanish businessman (1924–2022)

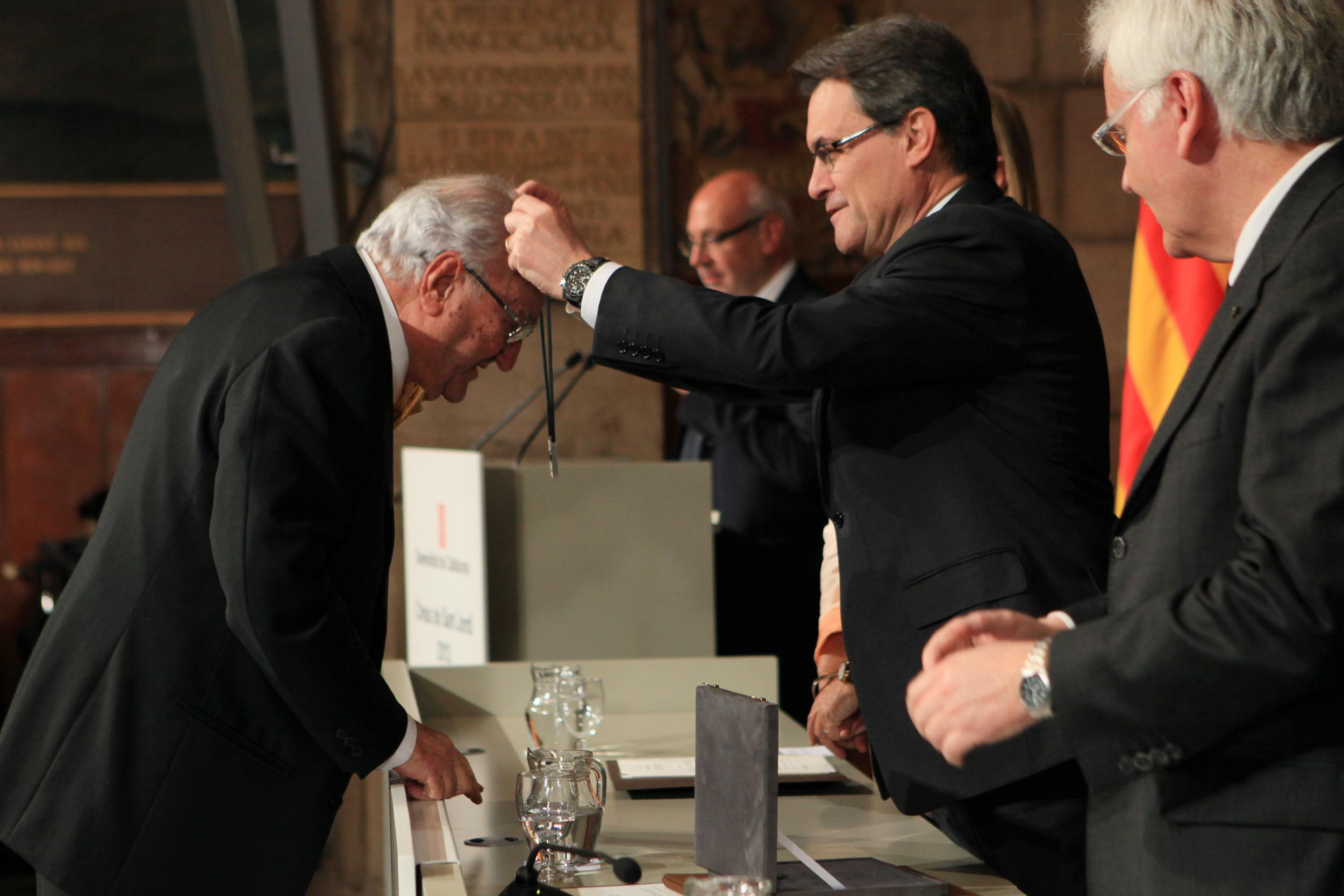
Carrasco receiving the Creu de Sant Jordi in 2013

Raimon Carrasco Azemar (17 February 1924 – 20 March 2022) was a Spanish businessman who served as president of FC Barcelona.

== Biography ==
Carrasco was born in Barcelona, Spain, son of Manuel Carrasco Formiguera and wife María del Pilar Azemar i Puig de la Bellacasa, and brother of politician Rosa Maria Carrasco i Azemar. He graduated from IESE Business School and started in the business world as director of Agricultural Industries Company, vice president of the Banco Industrial de Catalunya (BIC) and Sinorgan chemical company, and once he was Financial Advisor of FECSA, the Constructura Ribas and Pradell Chasyr and health insurer.

He was one of the architects of the modernization of the Chambers of Commerce, Industry and Navigation in 1966. He was manager of the FC Barcelona from 1969 to 1977 under the presidency of Agustí Montal i Costa, and interim president of the club from 18 December 1977 to 1 July 1978 when the club's first democratic elections after Francisco Franco were held. Josep Lluís Núñez was elected.

Also, he was a member of Unió Democrática de Catalunya (UDC) (though he never occupied a prominent position) and was a director and president of Banca Catalana. He was also president of the Foundation Enciclopèdia Catalan from 2002 to 2006 and member of the Foundation of the UPC. He was the Secretary of the Foundation Institut Guttmann and a member of the Advisory Board of FC Barcelona.

Carrasco died on 20 March 2022, at the age of 98, mere hours before Barcelona won an El Classico match against Real Madrid 4-0.

== Trophies won by club during his presidency ==
- Copa del Rey (1):
  - 1977-78

== Sources ==
- Notícia a El País sobre la implicación de Raimon Carrasco en el Caso Banca Catalana (Spanish)
- Raimon Carrasco at FC Barcelona.com
