= Simona Vintilă =

Romanian footballer (born 1980)

Simona Vintilă (born 25 February 1980 in Călărași) is a Romanian football striker who played for two seasons (2003–05) in FC Barcelona, in the Spanish Superliga Femenina. She subsequently played in Primera Nacional's UD Fasnia (05–06) and Sporting Plaza de Argel (06–08).
