= Natalia Astrain =

Spanish soccer coach and commentator

Personal information
- Full name: Natalia Astráin Massa
- Date of birth: January 5, 1976 (age 50)
- Place of birth: Pamplona, Spain

College career
Years	Team	Apps	(Gls)
- University of Navarra

Senior career*
Years	Team	Apps	(Gls)
1992–1998	SD Lagunak		

Managerial career
- 2002–2006: FC Barcelona Femení
- 2009–2010: CE Europa femení
- 2013–2014: FC Levante Las Planas
- 2014–2016: CF Damm Women
- 2016–2017: Atlético de Madrid (assistant)
- 2020–2022: FC Bay Area
- 2021: Kansas City Current (assistant)
- 2021–2023: United States U-17
- * Club domestic league appearances and goals

Natalia Astráin Massa (born January 5, 1976, in Pamplona, Spain) is a soccer commentator, former soccer player and soccer coach from Navarre. She was the first female coach in Spain to obtain the UEFA Pro Licence, which she did in 1999. She has a degree in Art History and two Masters in Psychology and sports coaching. As a soccer player, she played defense for SD Lagunak in the Spanish First division from 1992 to 1998.

== Managerial career ==
=== Roles in Spain, 2000–2017 ===
Astrain began coaching by starting and training youth (Cadet) teams at Bidezarra, a Navarrese school. Later, she coached Beti-Onak and the Navarre women's team. She also coached the Spanish women's under-21 team. From 2002 to 2006 she coached for FC Barcelona Femení, which was incorporated as a formal section of the club coincident with her arrival. In the early days of the women's team, it was common for the team to play on fields used as a parking lot on game days for the men's team. Despite these challenges, in 2004 under her leadership the team achieved promotion to the Superliga (the Spanish First Division at the time). In the 2013–14 season she coached FC Levante Las Planas of the First Division. In the 2016–17 season she signed as second coach for Atlético de Madrid, and with them she won the league that season.

=== Roles in USA, 2017–present ===
In 2017, Astrain made the jump to the United States, when contacts she had made while coaching at Barcelona academies and camps in the US were looking for someone with a background like hers. She was hired as the technical director of Rise Soccer Club in Houston, a position she held for two seasons. The club had 5,000 players from age 5 to U19, and served as a feeder for local NWSL club Houston Dash. In 2020 she was hired as the coach of FC Bay Area, a WPSL youth development club with Barça roots. Prior to the 2021 season, Astrain signed on as the assistant coach of the Kansas City Current in the NWSL, which had newly relocated from Utah.

While at Rise SC, Astrain had contributed to US Soccer programming in the form of camps and clinics, and as an assistant coach for the U-15 and U-17 girls national teams. This building familiarity led the federation to appoint her as head coach of the USA Under-17 youth national team in November 2021. To take the job, she left her role with the KC Current. Astrain led the U-17 team through qualifying, and into the 2022 U-17 World Cup, where they were eliminated in the quarterfinals by Nigeria. She departed from US Soccer in May 2023, citing as reasons the uncertainty in the wake of the departure of USSF Sporting Director Earnie Stewart, and interest in her services as a broadcaster from Telemundo for covering the 2023 FIFA Women's World Cup.

== Media career ==
Astrain has regularly appeared in soccer media, on TV and in print, during the course of her career. In 2015 she provided regular commentary on Barcelona's matches on Barça TV.

Starting with Spain's first appearance at the FIFA Women's World Cup in 2015, and continuing through 2021, she held a weekly opinion column in Mundo Deportivo, writing about women's football.

Since 2019 she has provided Spanish-language commentary on fútbol for Telemundo, initially for the 2020 Olympics, then for the 2022 FIFA World Cup in Qatar, the 2023 FIFA Women's World Cup in Australia and New Zealand, the Liga MX Femenil and the men's English Premier League. Now an official soccer analyst on their team, Telemundo has announced that Astrain is expected to be part of their coverage for the 2024 Olympics and the 2026 World Cup.
