= Llers =

- Municipality
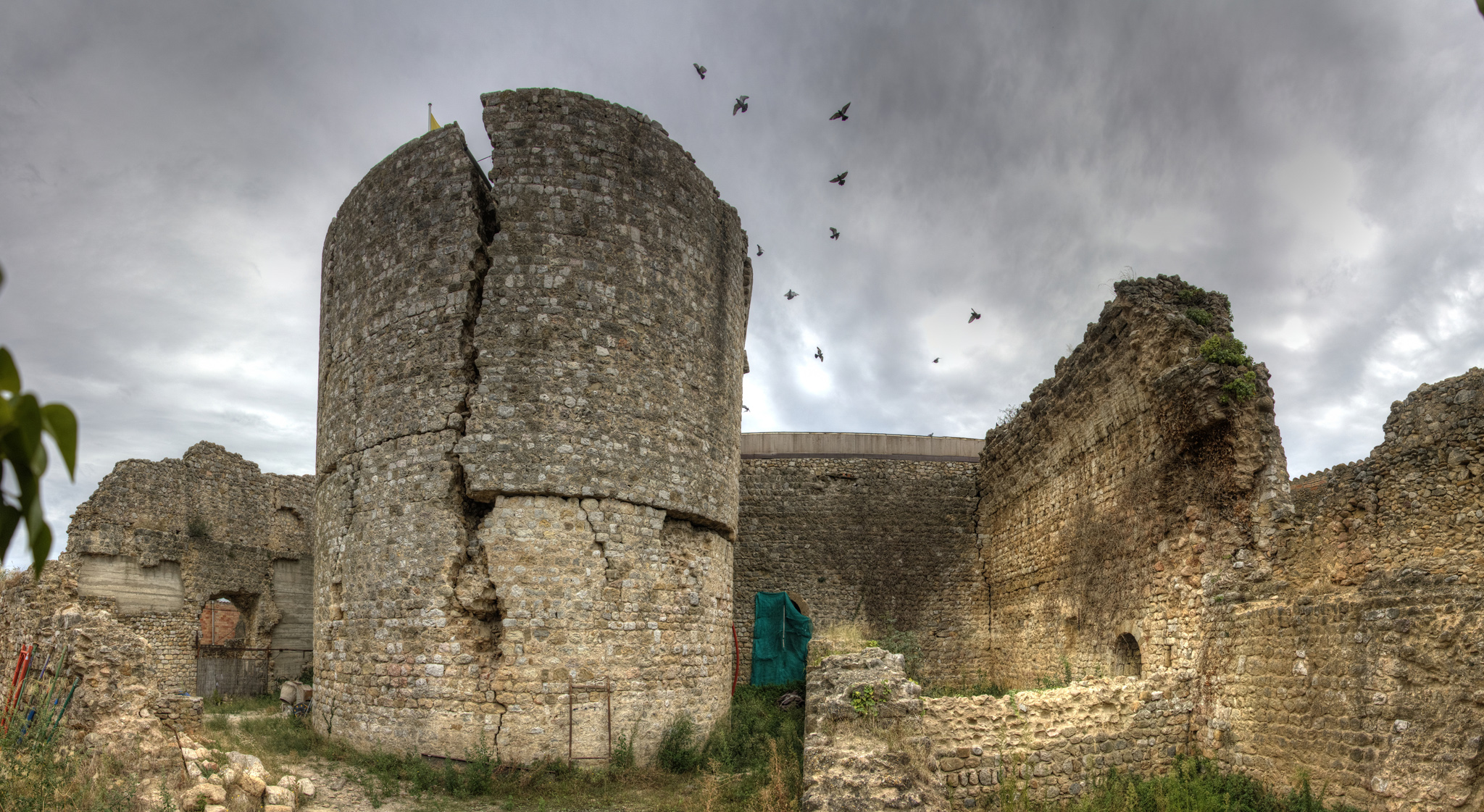
- Llers Castle

- Flag Coat of arms

- Location in Catalonia Llers (Spain)
- Coordinates: 42.296°N 2.911°E
- Country: Spain
- Community: Catalonia
- Province: Girona
- Comarca: Alt Empordà

Government
  - Mayor: Carles Fortiana Costa (2015) (CiU)

Area
  - Total: 21.3 km^{2} (8.2 sq mi)
- Elevation: 142 m (466 ft)

Population (2025-01-01)
  - Total: 1,269
  - Density: 59.6/km^{2} (154/sq mi)
- Demonym(s): Llersencs, Llersenques
- Postal code: 17093
- Website: www.llers.cat

Llers (Catalan pronunciation: [ˈʎɛɾs]) is a municipality in the comarca of Alt Empordà, Girona, Catalonia, Spain
