= Josep Lluís Núñez =

Spanish football executive (1931–2018)

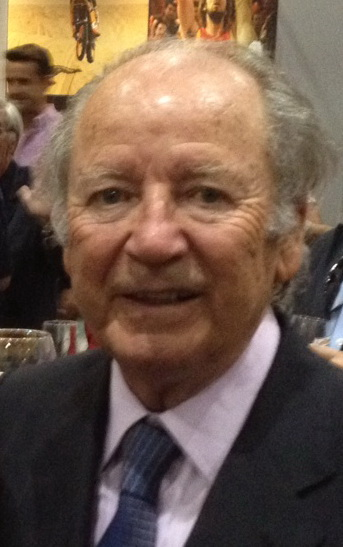

35th President of FC Barcelona
- In office 1 July 1978 – 23 July 2000
- Preceded by: Raimon Carrasco
- Succeeded by: Joan Gaspart

Personal details
- Born: José Luís Núñez Clemente; 7 September 1931 Barakaldo, Basque Country, Spain
- Died: 3 December 2018 (aged 87) Barcelona, Catalonia, Spain

José Luis Núñez Clemente (7 September 1931 – 3 December 2018), often known by the Catalanized form of his name used by the Catalan press, Josep Lluís Núñez i Clemente, was president of FC Barcelona between 1978 and 2000. He was elected club president, despite having no previous connection with the club. His main objectives were to establish Barça as a world-class sports club and to give the club financial stability.

Núñez and his wife, Maria Lluïsa Navarro, once owned the Núñez i Navarro construction company and the Núñez i Navarro Hotel chain.

== Presidency ==
Núñez oversaw one of the club's most successful eras and has been Barça's most successful president in terms of winning trophies. During his presidency, the club's four professional teams amassed 176 trophies – 30 in football, 36 in basketball, 65 in handball and 45 in roller hockey. This included a remarkable quartet in 1999, the club's centenary year, when the four teams were all crowned champions of Spain. Barcelona were also European football champions in 1992.

During his presidency, Barcelona membership increased from 77,905 to 106,000, leading to an increase in the capacity of the Camp Nou stadium. The number of penyes (fan clubs) also increased from 96 based in Spain to over 1,300 based throughout the world. Núñez gave the club a solid economic base and increased the club's wealth. The club built the Mini Estadi in 1982, opened the Barcelona Museum in 1984, expanded the Palau Blaugrana to a capacity of 8,500, bought the land where Ciutat Esportiva Joan Gamper would be established, and opened the La Masia, a residence for young players.

== Hesperia Mutiny ==
Núñez was re-elected twice without opposition, but in 1988 he had to face the players' rebellion known as the Hesperia Mutiny (named after the hotel where the players reunited), which ended with the dismissal of almost all the team (14 out of the 26 players and the coach). Afterwards, he hired Johan Cruyff as coach, and the club saw the golden era of the Dream Team, which won the club's first European Cup in 1992. In 1989, he won the re-election against rival Sixte Cambra, and was again re-elected without opposition in 1993. The next year, he started the Barcelona Foundation to prevent the conversion of the club to a privately owned sporting society, per the new Spanish law.

Disagreements with Cruyff forced the coach's dismissal, and since then Núñez had to face the open opposition led by the former coach. In 1997, he was reelected for the last time, winning against rival Ángel Fernández. Months later, he survived a vote of no-confidence instigated by the opponent platform "L'Elefant Blau", one of whose leaders, Joan Laporta, would become the club's president several years later.

He hired first Bobby Robson and then Louis van Gaal as coaches. But the lack of titles in van Gaal's third year and his lack of understanding with the fans forced his dismissal, and that of Núñez himself, tired of being pressured. In 2000, he resigned after 22 years as club president.

== Trophies won by club during presidency ==
=== Football ===
Barcelona:

- La Liga:
  - 1984–85, 1990–91, 1991–92, 1992–93, 1993–94, 1997–98, 1998–99
- Copa del Rey:
  - 1980–81, 1982–83, 1987–88, 1989–90, 1996–97, 1997–98
- Copa de la Liga:
  - 1983, 1986
- Supercopa de España:
  - 1983, 1991, 1992, 1994, 1996
- UEFA Champions League:
  - 1991–92
- UEFA Cup Winners' Cup:
  - 1978–79, 1981–82, 1988–89, 1996–97
- UEFA Super Cup:
  - 1992, 1997

Barcelona Femení:

- Copa de la Reina de Fútbol:
  - 1994

== Trial ==
On 28 July 2011, Nuñez was sentenced to six years in prison, like his son José Luis Núñez Navarro, and to pay a fine of two million euros for the crime of bribery – and another 36,000 euros fine for documentary falsification due to his involvement in the "Hacienda Case", offences of which he has always declared himself innocent. The ruling of the Provincial Court of Barcelona found proven that Núñez, father and son, bribed tax inspectors with almost one million euros to stop declaring to the treasury approximately 13.1 million between 1991 and 1999. He was also sentenced financial adviser of the Núñez, Salvador Sánchez Guiu, to six years of prison and 2 million euros of fine. The sentence was appealed to the Supreme Court, so they were not imprisoned and only the withdrawal of the passport and the obligation to appear before the court every 15 days were agreed. On 16 November 2014, José Luis Nuñez entered the prison of Quatre Camins in the municipality of La Roca del Vallés, Barcelona, after being reduced the sentence for the crime of bribery to two years and two months, a fine of 1.5 million euros and disqualification for public office for seven years. After serving his sentence, he rejoined his activity as head of the Núñez and Navarro real estate group. Subsequently, the Tax Agency made new verification and investigation actions on the exercises included in the process and concluded that there was no type of fraud.
