= Copa Catalunya Femenina =

Annual competition in Catalonia, Spain

Copa Catalunya (women)
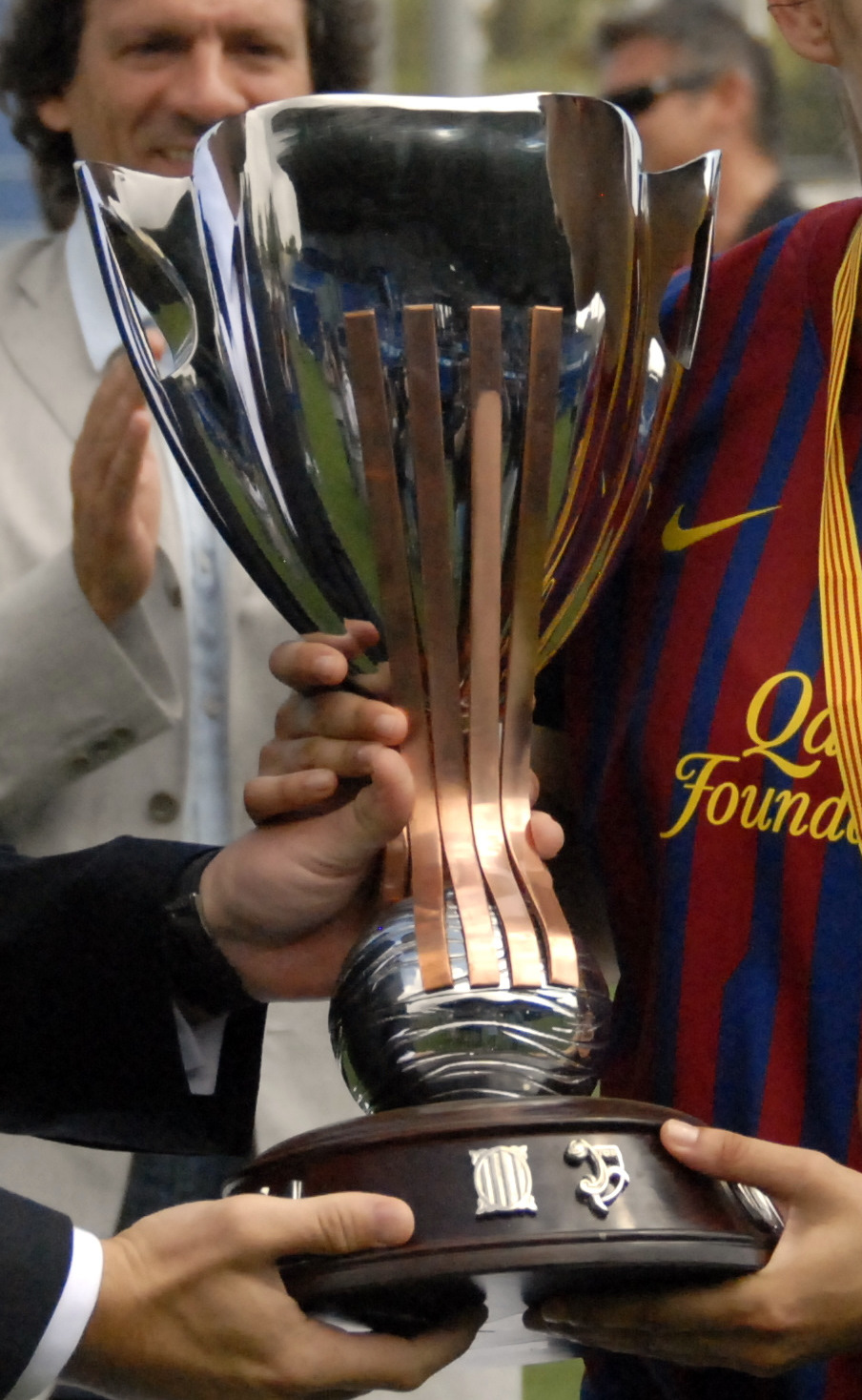
- Founded: 2005; 21 years ago
- Region: Catalonia
- Current champions: SE AEM (2nd title)
- Most championships: FC Barcelona (11 titles)
- Website: www.fcf.cat

The Copa Catalunya Femenina is a knockout competition organised by the Catalan Football Federation (FCF) for women's football clubs in the Catalonia autonomous community of Spain. Since its establishment in 2005 it has been dominated by FC Barcelona and RCD Espanyol, with eleven and five titles respectively: (Note: The FCF officially recognises Barcelona as having won fifteen Copa Catalunya titles, and Espanyol with seven, including their Copa Generalitat/Catalana wins as of updated 2026 records.) in its initial run of 15 consecutive years, all but one final was contested by both teams (in 2010, Espanyol and Barcelona met in the semifinals).

Previous iterations of the same tournament concept organised by the FCF were for the Copa Generalitat Femenina, also called the Copa Catalana Femenina, contested in the 20th century after formal incorporation of women's football. Barcelona won this competition four times.

== Copa Catalunya (2005–present) ==
The competition was suspended in 2020 due to the COVID-19 pandemic; upon its relaunch in 2022 it was branded as the Copa Catalunya Amateur Femenina, and neither Barcelona nor Espanyol (nor other teams playing in the top three divisions, including Levante Las Planas) entered. In 2024, the member clubs of the FCF agreed a plan to extend the competition to professional teams again, with Barcelona, Espanyol and renamed Levante Badalona returning and entering in the final stages.

=== Finals ===
Year	Winner	Result	Runner-up	Semifinalists
2005	RCD Espanyol	1–0	FC Barcelona	
2006	RCD Espanyol	7–1	FC Barcelona	CE Europa, ?
2007	RCD Espanyol	3–0	FC Barcelona	CE Europa, ?
2008	RCD Espanyol	2–0	FC Barcelona	
2009	FC Barcelona	3–3 (7–6 p)	RCD Espanyol	UE L'Estartit, Les Preses CF
2010	FC Barcelona	3–0	UE L'Estartit	RCD Espanyol, FC Levante Las Planas
2011	FC Barcelona	1–0	RCD Espanyol	UE L'Estartit, FC Levante Las Planas
2012	FC Barcelona	1–1 (8–7 p)	RCD Espanyol	CE Sant Gabriel, UE L'Estartit
2013	RCD Espanyol	1–1 (4–3 p)	FC Barcelona	FC Levante Las Planas, Escola Les Garrigues
2014	FC Barcelona	4–0	RCD Espanyol	CE Europa, FC Levante Las Planas
2015	FC Barcelona	2–0	RCD Espanyol	FC Levante Las Planas, FC Sant Pere Pescador
2016	FC Barcelona	6–0	RCD Espanyol	Pontenc CE, CE Seagull
2017	FC Barcelona	3–0	RCD Espanyol	CE Europa, CE Seagull
2018	FC Barcelona	7–0	RCD Espanyol	CF Pardinyes, SE AEM
2019	FC Barcelona	4–0	RCD Espanyol	CE Seagull, SE AEM
Not held 2020–22
2022	CE Sant Gabriel	9–1	CF Torelló	Porqueres, Santa Susanna
2023	SE AEM B	1–0	CF Igualada	Palautordera, Women's Soccer School
2024–25	FC Barcelona	1–0	Levante Badalona	Vic Riuprimer REFO, SE AEM
2025–26	SE AEM	3–3 (3–2 p)	CE Europa	FC Barcelona B, Ona Sant Adrià

== Copa Generalitat/Copa Catalana (1981–2000) ==
=== Finals ===
Year	Date	Winner	Result	Runner-up	Ref.
1980–81		RCD Espanyol (1)		CF Sabadell	
1981–82		PFB Horta (1)	3–0	RCD Espanyol	
1982–83		PB Barcilona Deco Parquet (1)			
1983–84	14 July 1984	PB Barcilona Deco Parquet (2)	3–0	CF Barcelona	
1984–85	29 June 1985	CF Barcelona (1)	1–0	FF Vallès Occidental	
1985–86	5 July 1986	FF Athenas (1)	1–1 (4–3 p.)	CF Barcelona	
1986–87	11 July 1987	PB Barcilona Deco Parquet (3)	1–0	FF Vallès Occidental	
1987–88	11 June 1988	FF Vallès Occidental (1)	2–1	CF Sabadell	
1988–89	4 June 1989	FF Vallès Occidental (2)	1–1 (4–2 p.)	CF Sabadell	
1989–90		RCD Espanyol (2)			
1990–91		FF Athenas (2)			
1991–92	9 February 1992	CF Barcelona (Note: The team that competed was CF Barcelona-Formas, likely the club's B or C team.) (2)	8–0	UE Tossa	
1992–93					
1993–94		EFF Cornellà (1)			
1994–95		CF Barcelona (3)			
1995–96		EFF Cornellà (2)			
1996–97		EFF Cornellà (3)			
1997–98					
1998–99					
1999–2000		CF Barcelona (4)			

== See also ==
- Derbi Femení (Catalan women's rivalry)
- Copa Catalunya (male counterpart)
- Copa Euskal Herria (equivalent competition in the Basque region)
