= El Cilindro =

Stadium in Avellaneda, Argentina

Coordinates: 34°40′03″S 58°22′07″W

President Perón Stadium
- Estadio Presidente Perón
- El Cilindro (The Cylinder)
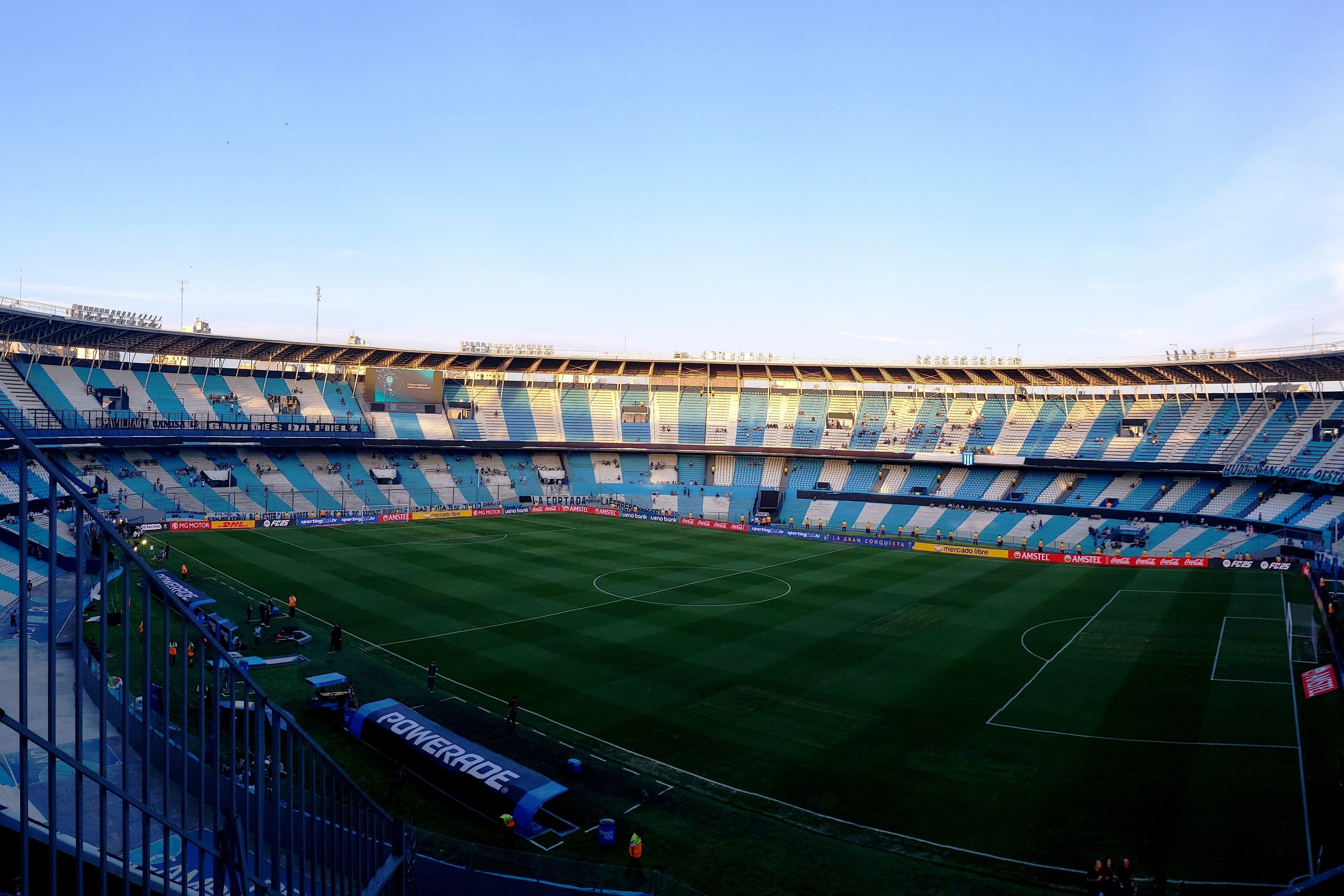
- Interior view of the stadium
- Interactive map of President Perón Stadium
- Location: Mozart and Corbatta, Avellaneda, Argentina
- Owner: Racing Club
- Operator: Racing Club (1950–present)
- Capacity: 50,880
- Surface: Grass
- Record attendance: 120,000 (Racing 2–1 Celtic, 1967 Intercontinental Cup)
- Current use: Football; Concerts

Construction
- Built: 1949–50
- Opened: 3 September 1950; 76 years ago
- Renovated: 1995–97
- Cost: 11 000 000 US
- Architect: Eduardo E. Baumeister
- Builder: GEOPÉ

Tenant
- Racing (1950–present)

Website
- racingclub.com.ar/estadio

El Cilindro, (Note: Spanish pronunciation: [el θiˈlindɾo]; lit. 'The Cylinder', named after its cylindrical structure.) officially known as Estadio Presidente Perón, (Note: Spanish pronunciation: [estaðjo pɾesiˈðente peˈɾon]; lit. 'President Perón Stadium', named after Juan Perón.) is an association football stadium in Avellaneda, Argentina. It is the home of Racing.

Opened in 1950 on the site of the former stadium, it was designed by engineers from GEOPÉ, a subsidiary of the German firm Philipp Holzmann, known for rebuilding cities after World War II. Its original capacity of 120,000 was gradually reduced over the years due to renovations and safety regulations, and it is currently approved for 50,880 spectators.

== History ==
=== Background ===
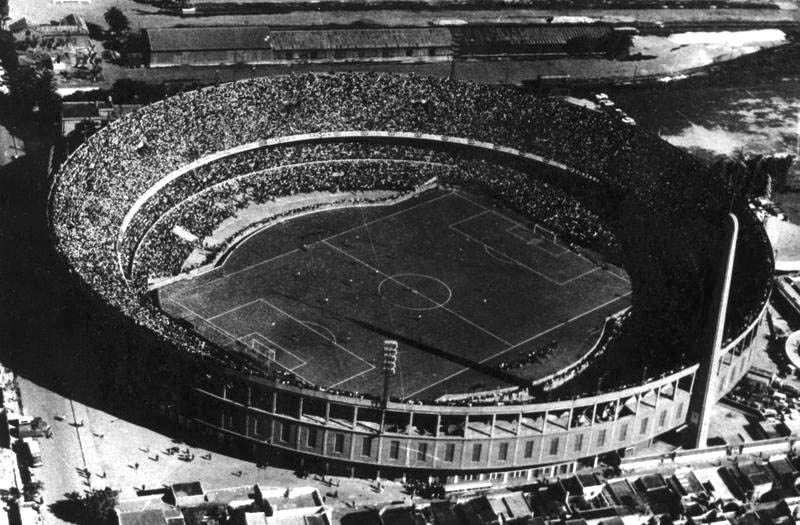
Aerial view of El Cilindro in 1950

Racing’s first stadium, featuring wooden stands, was located at Alsina and Colón streets in Avellaneda. With a capacity of about 50,000 spectators, the venue hosted important matches. However, the land belonged to the Buenos Aires Great Southern Railway.

In 1944, after extended negotiations, the club acquired an additional 30,000 m^{2} adjacent to the stadium to expand its sports grounds and build a new concrete stadium. In 1946, the government of Juan Perón, through Finance Minister Ramón Cereijo, granted a loan to fund the construction. The new stadium was named Presidente Perón (President Perón) in honor of the president of Argentina.

The last match at the former stadium was played on 1 December 1946, a 6–4 defeat to Rosario Central, after which the facility was dismantled. Although Perón suggested building the stadium in the Retiro district of Buenos Aires, the club chose to remain in Avellaneda. The new stadium was constructed by GEOPÉ, a subsidiary of the German firm Philipp Holzmann, known for its expertise in post-World War II reconstruction.

=== Opening ===
The stadium officially opened on 3 September 1950, with Racing beating Vélez Sarsfield 1–0, thanks to a goal from Llamil Simes. The following year, it was selected as the main venue for the 1951 Pan American Games, hosting the opening ceremony and all football matches.

=== Following years ===
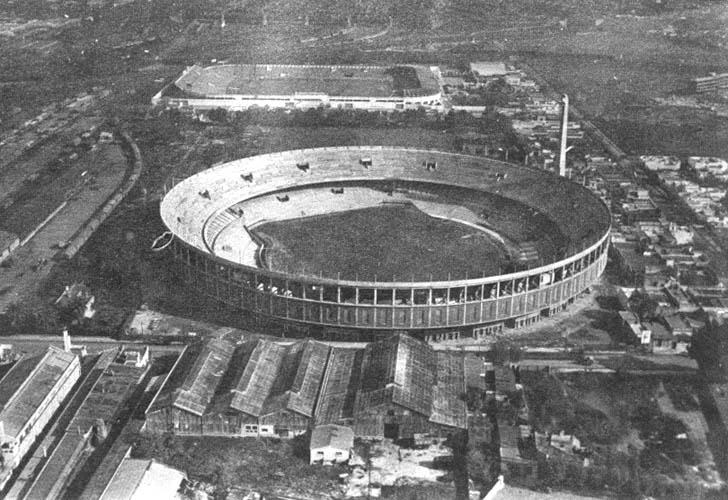
El Cilindro is located near Independiente’s stadium (currently known as Libertadores de América)

In 1966, new lighting towers were inaugurated by the multinational company Siemens during a friendly match in which Racing defeated Bayern Munich 3–2.

On 1 November 1967, the stadium hosted the second leg of the 1967 Intercontinental Cup, where Racing defeated Celtic 2–1. The match drew approximately 120,000 spectators, marking the highest attendance ever recorded at a stadium in Argentina.

In 1981, following a 4–0 victory by Racing over Huracán, the stadium was closed due to lack of maintenance. However, it reopened two years later in 1983 with a match that ended in a 0–0 draw between Racing and Estudiantes (LP).

In 1993, the municipality of Avellaneda Partido renamed Cuyo Street to Oreste Corbatta Street in honor of the Racing footballer who had died two years earlier. From then on, the stadium's official location was at the intersection of Mozart and Corbatta streets.

In 1997, during Racing’s 3–2 victory over Sporting Cristal in the 1997 Copa Libertadores, a metal structure was installed in the stadium to support a translucent roof with a new opening system. This roof was first used in a 2–1 victory against San Lorenzo in 1998, making El Cilindro the first stadium in Argentina to have all its seating areas fully covered.

In 2002, a new security and surveillance system was introduced, featuring multiple cameras and loudspeakers. In 2004, the perimeter fences around the home stands were removed.

In 2017, the stadium’s lighting system was upgraded with Arena Vision technology during a friendly match in which Racing defeated Huracán 4–3. A few months later, a giant screen was installed, developed by the company Publicidad Estática Internacional.

Since 2020, following a promise to renovate the stadium, several major upgrades have taken place. In 2022, the moat surrounding the pitch was removed. In 2024, the entire lighting system was replaced with new technology provided by Synergia It Group, and changes were made to the playing surface, including the addition of synthetic turf around the team benches.

== Concerts ==
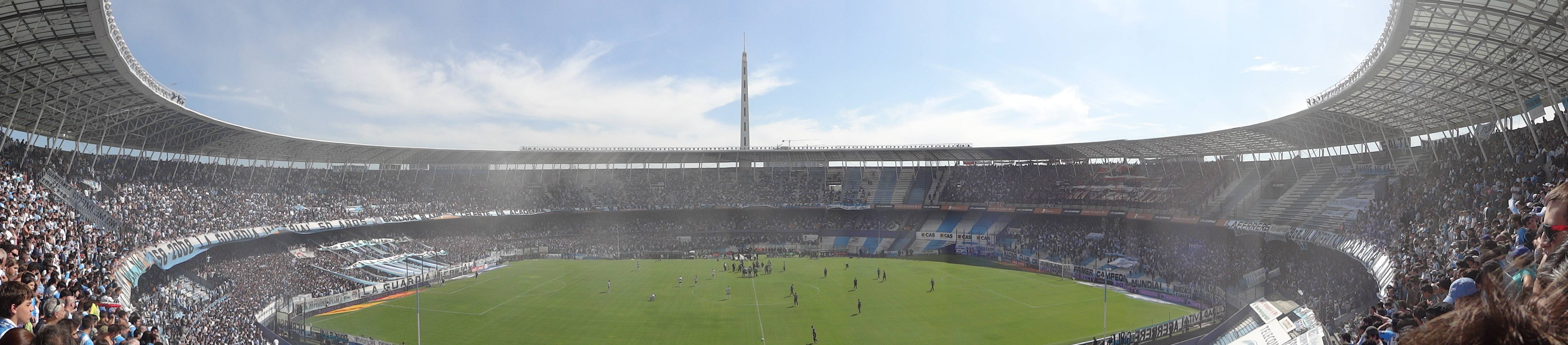
Panoramic view of the stadium during a football match in 2013

The stadium has hosted some national and international concerts since the late 1990s. Some of the artists to have played at the stadium are Patricio Rey y sus Redonditos de Ricota (1998, att: 45,000), Rammstein (on 27 November 2010, att: 40,000), Judas Priest and Whitesnake together (18 Sep 2011, att: 35,000), Viejas Locas (14 Jul 2012), La Renga (2024, att: 50,000) and Wos (20 April 2024).
