= Moonlight tower =

Structure, generally over 50 meters tall, for large-scale electric street lighting

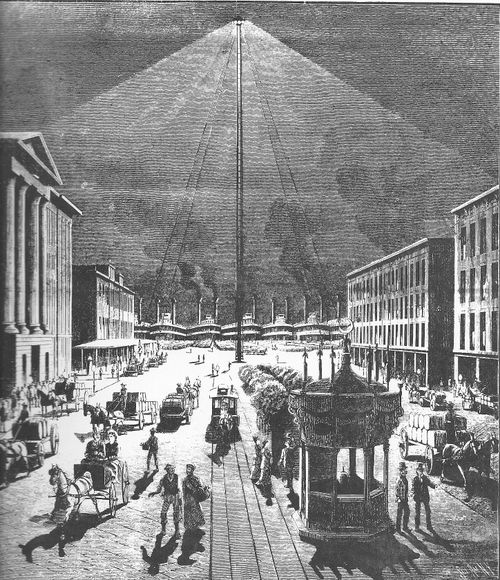
Illustration of a Moonlight Tower in New Orleans, 1882

A moonlight tower or moontower is a lighting structure designed to illuminate areas of a town or city at night. Only the collection of towers in Austin, Texas, have been termed historically "moonlight towers," a term that dates to the mid-20th century. The light from the towers was compared to moonlight, after they were installed in 1895.

The towers were most prevalent during the late 19th century in cities across the United States. They were most common during the 1880s and 1890s. In some places they were used when standard street-lighting (using smaller, shorter, and more numerous lamps) was deemed impractically expensive. In other places they were used in addition to gas street lighting. The towers were designed to illuminate areas often of several blocks at once, on the "high light" principle. Arc lamps, known for their exceptionally bright and harsh light, were the most common method of illumination. As incandescent electric street lighting became common, the prevalence of towers began to wane.

Moonlight towers in Austin, Texas, near TxDOT headquarters, served as inspiration for some of the first high-mast lighting towers in the US during the 1960s and 1970s.

== Austin, Texas ==
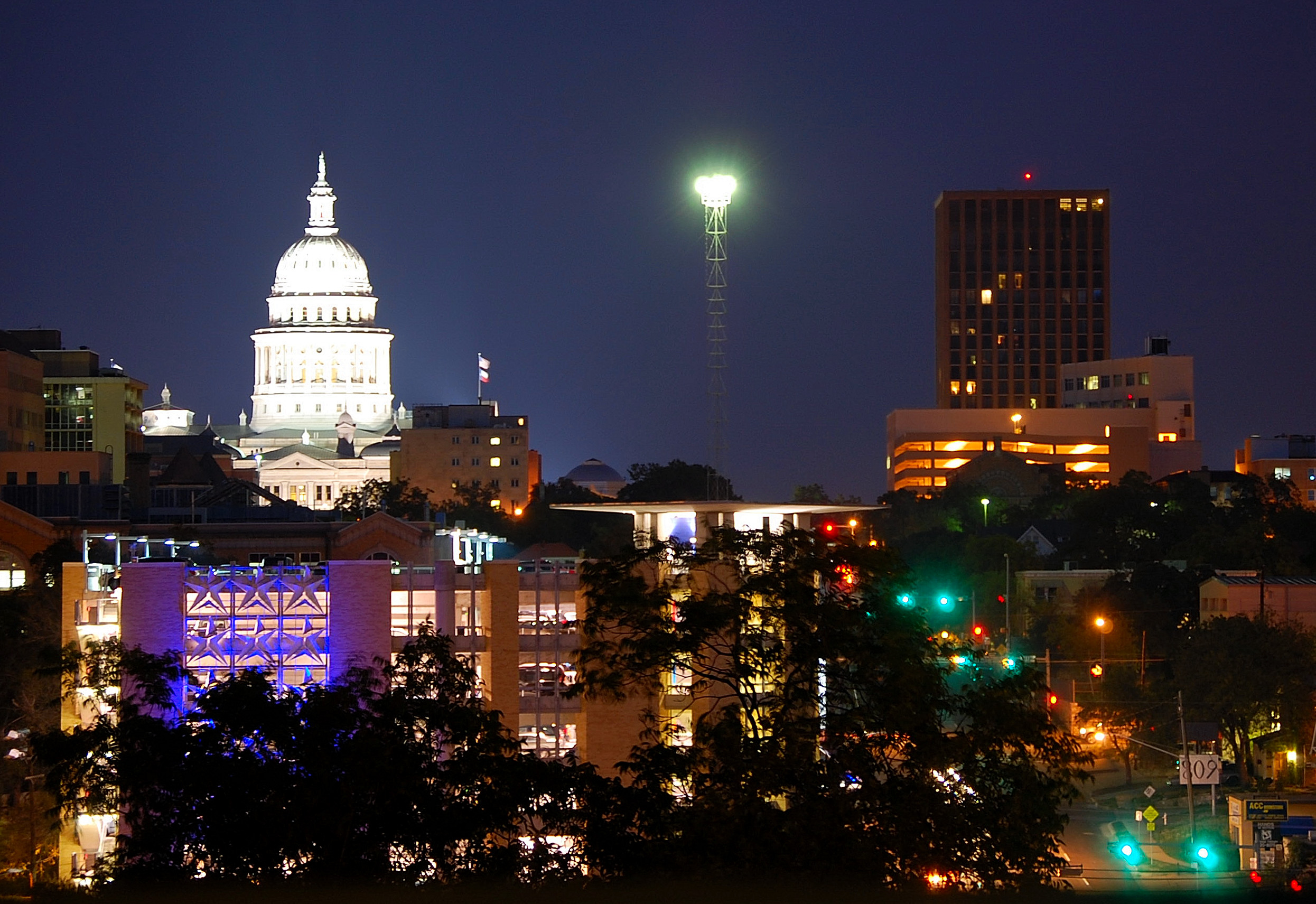
A moonlight tower in Austin, Texas, 2009

Austin, Texas, is the only city in the world known to still have moonlight towers. They are 165 feet (50 m) tall with foundations 15 feet (4.6 m) wide. The towers were manufactured in Indiana by Fort Wayne Electric Company, and assembled on site. A single tower cast light from six carbon arc lamps, illuminating a 1,500-foot (460 m) radius brightly enough to read an analog watch face.

In 1993, the city of Austin dismantled the towers and restored every bolt, turnbuckle, and guy-wire as part of a $1.3 million project, the completion of which was celebrated in 1995 with a citywide festival.

In 2024, the last of the city's towers was upgraded from 400 W incandescent bulbs (which replaced carbon arc in 1923) to 80 W LED bulbs.

== Detroit ==
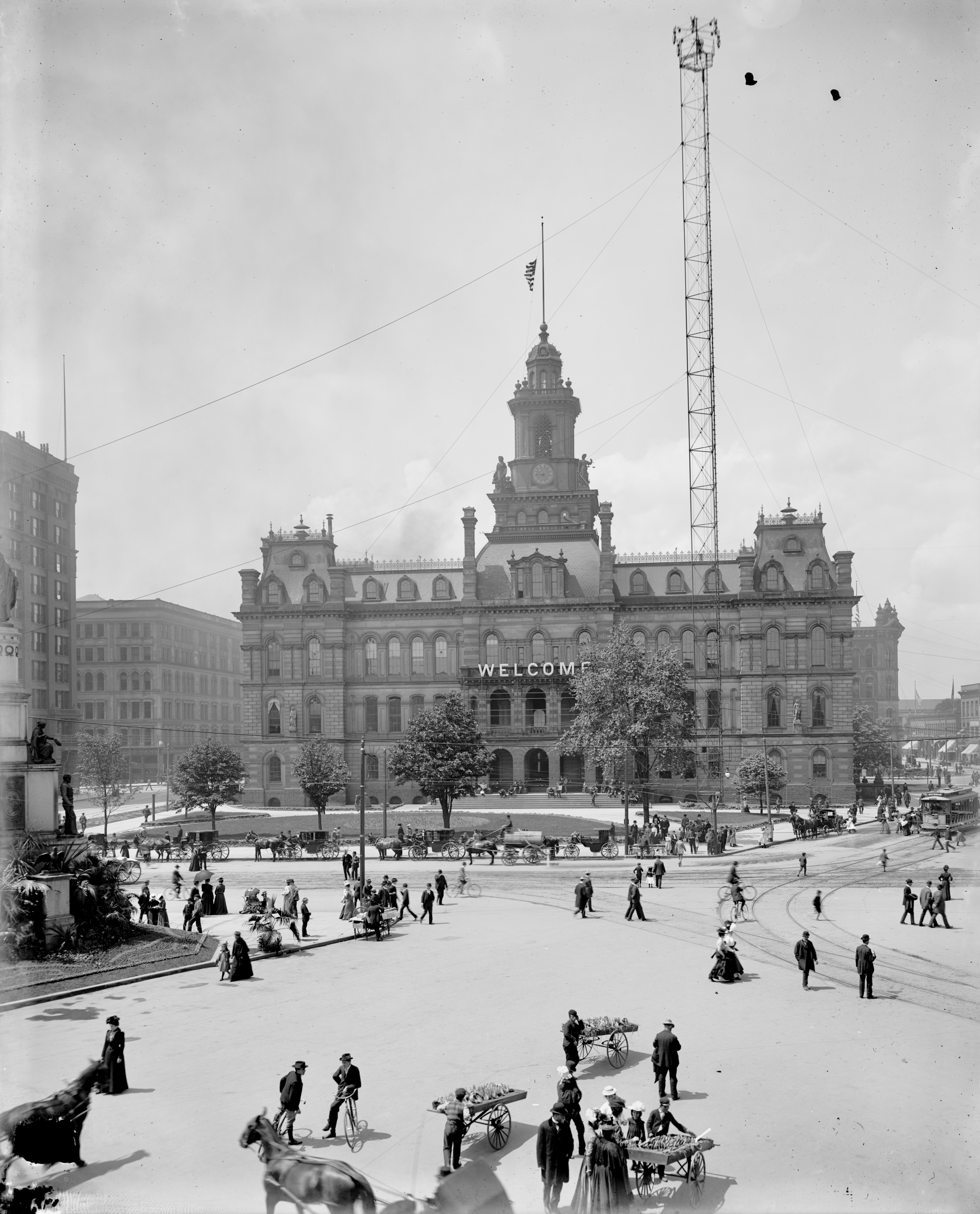
A light tower In front of City Hall, Detroit, Michigan, about 1900.

Detroit, Michigan, had a particularly extensive system of light towers, inaugurated in 1882. 122 towers, 175 feet (53 m) tall and 1,000–1,200 feet (300–370 m) apart in downtown Detroit, were shorter, less powerful, and twice as far apart as typically found elsewhere. The towers were masts secured with cables and were maintained daily by crews who hauled themselves to the top using a counterweighted elevator. The system covered about 21 square miles (54 km^{2}). It soon had to be supplemented with incandescent lighting in the city center, partly because trees interfered with the light. By the end of the 1800s, they remained only in Cadillac Square. The towers were soon removed from there also.

== Minneapolis ==
In 1883, Minneapolis, Minnesota, built a single 275-foot (84 m) tall "electric mast" in the Gateway District to eliminate the need for 150 gas lamps in the area, at a cost of $500. The tower's eight 4,000 candlepower arc lights cast stark shadows and failed to illuminate streets. After the Minneapolis City Council voted to remove the tower in 1892, its copper ball sat in the window of a local saloon.

== New Orleans ==
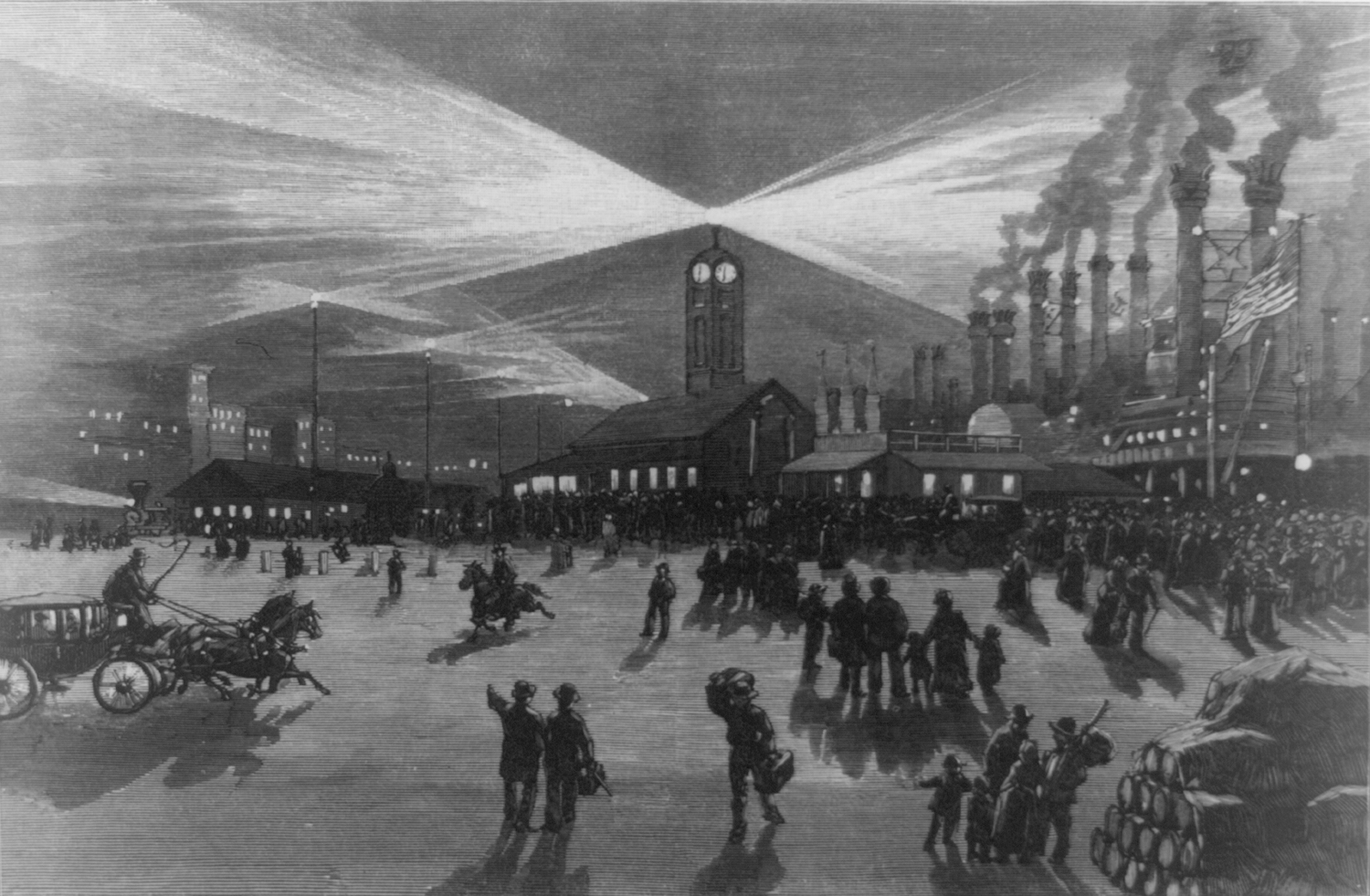
New Orleans riverfront electrically illuminated at night, 1883.

Towers were erected in New Orleans, Louisiana, starting in the early 1880s. One set of towers illuminated a section of the Mississippi River levee, aiding in loading and unloading ships at night in the busy port. A tower at the busy intersection of Canal Street, Bourbon Street, and Carondelet Street was constructed, with a set of four water pipes to aid fire-fighting in the nearby multi-story buildings.

== San Jose, California ==
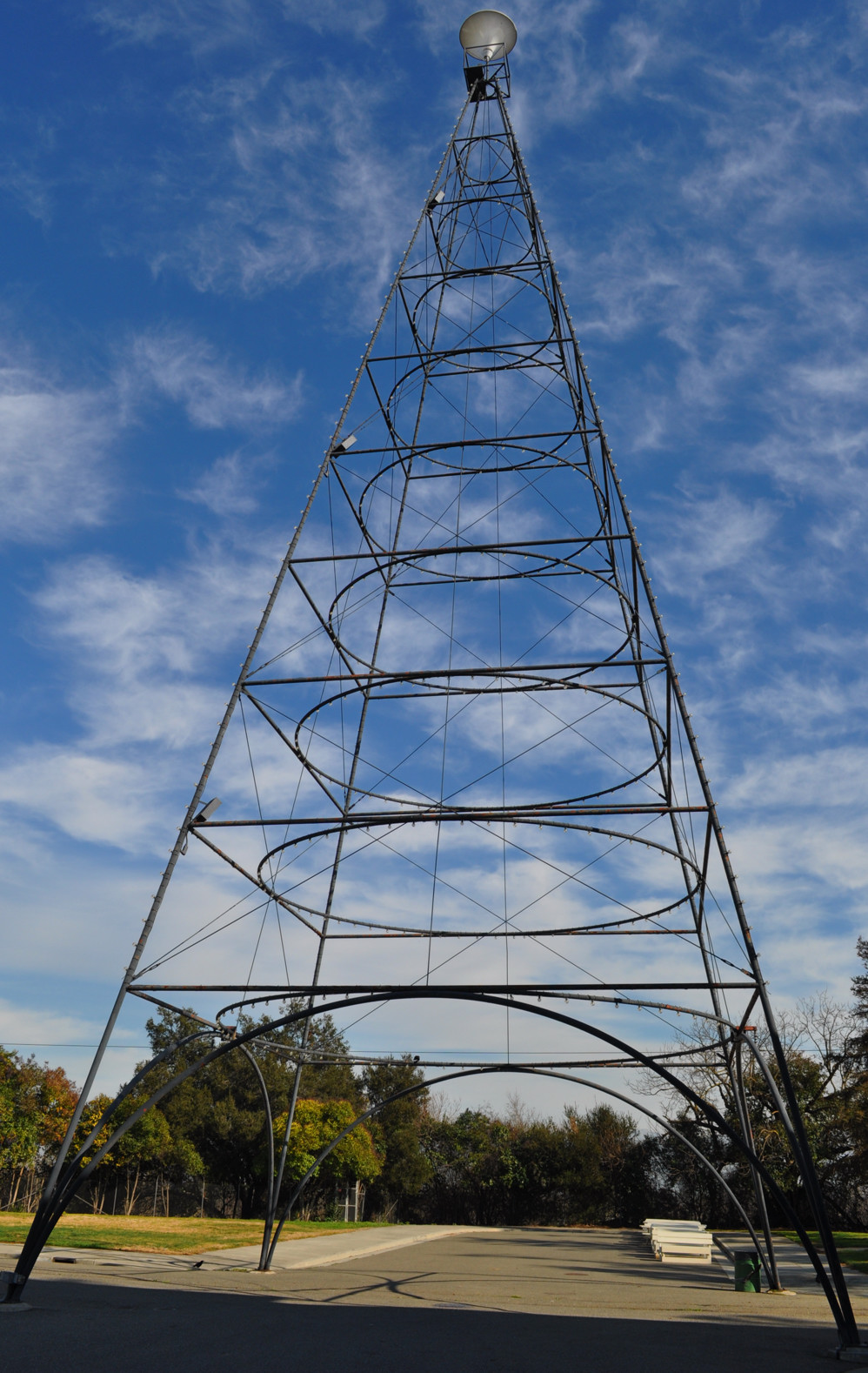
San Jose Electric Light Tower half-size replica.

In 1881, a 237-foot (72 m)-tall tower was erected spanning the intersection of Santa Clara and Market streets in San Jose, California, making it the first city west of the Rocky Mountains to be illuminated by electric light. James Jerome ("J.J.") Owens, publisher of the San Jose Mercury, got the idea for the tower after visiting the first electrical lighting station in San Francisco in 1879. The tower collapsed due to damage from a storm on December 3, 1915.

In 1977, a nearly half-sized replica, 115 feet (35 m) tall, was constructed at the San Jose Historical Museum.

== Wabash, Indiana ==
Wabash, Indiana, was the first city to use arc lamps. Four were mounted on the dome of the county courthouse and first activated on March 31, 1880. Wabash used a self-regulating lamp invented by Charles Brush in 1870.

== See also ==
- High-mast lighting
- Light tower (equipment)
