= High-mast lighting =

Lighting pole for large areas

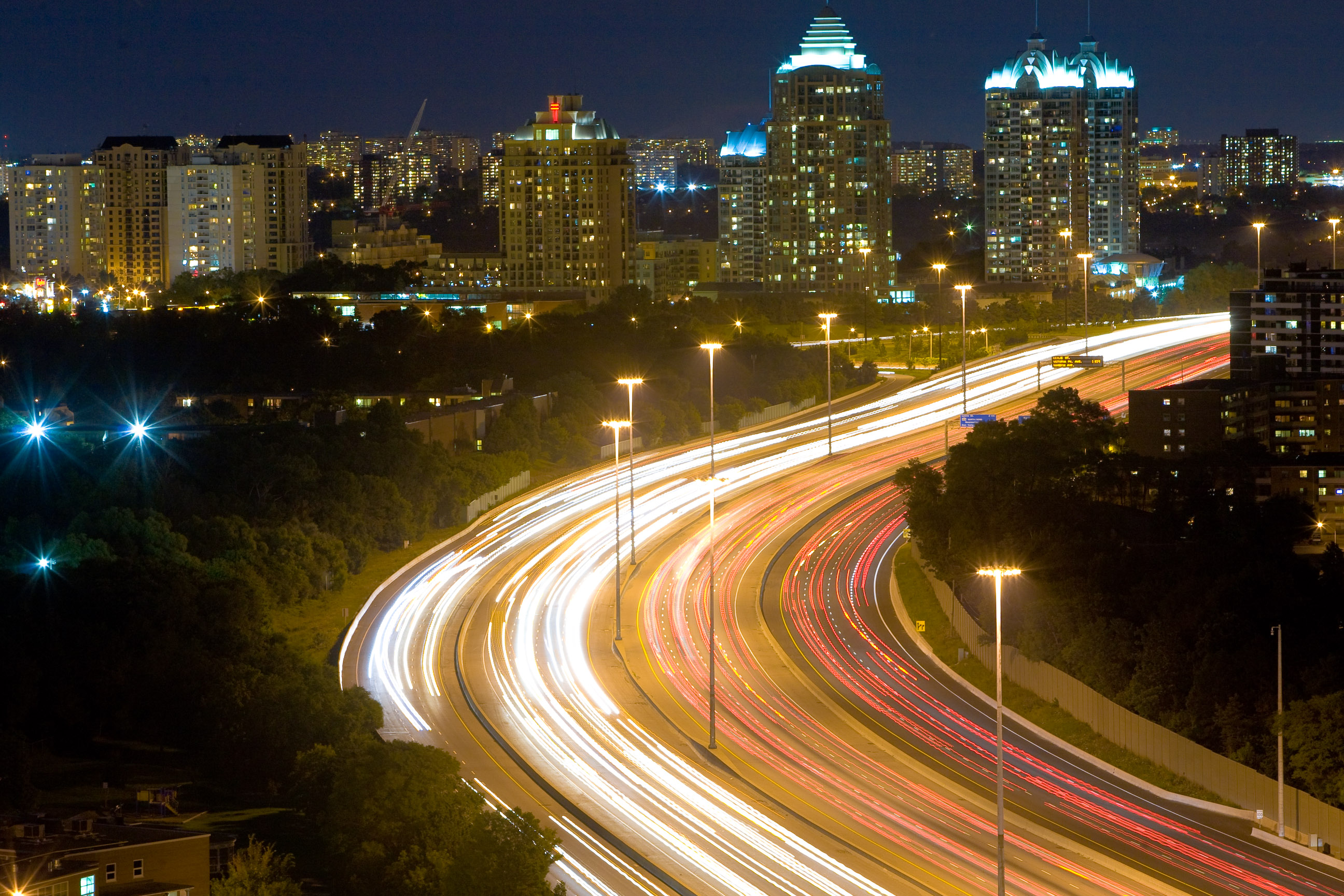
High-mast lighting along Highway 401 in Ontario, Canada

High-mast lighting refers to a lighting system in which luminaires are mounted at the top of a tall pole to illuminate large outdoor areas. These systems are commonly used where broad, uniform light coverage is required from a limited number of mounting locations, and where minimising the number of poles is advantageous.

High-mast poles typically range in height from approximately 15 m (49 ft) to 50 m (164 ft) or more, distinguishing them from conventional street lighting systems, which are generally installed at lower mounting heights. The increased elevation allows for wider light distribution, improved uniformity, and more efficient use of infrastructure across large-scale sites.

Modern high-mast lighting systems predominantly utilise LED luminaires, which provide significantly improved energy efficiency, longer operational life, and enhanced optical control compared to legacy technologies such as high-pressure sodium, metal halide, and mercury vapour lamps. Advanced LED optics and control systems enable more precise management of light spill, glare, and obtrusive light, supporting compliance with contemporary lighting standards and environmental considerations.

Luminaires are mounted on a headframe at the top of the pole. While earlier designs commonly featured circular ring arrangements, many contemporary systems utilise tiered or directionally configured headframes, allowing luminaires to be oriented toward specific target areas. This approach improves lighting performance, particularly where pole placement is constrained or where asymmetric light distribution is required.

High-mast lighting is widely used across a range of applications, including:

Sports field and stadium lighting, port and harbour infrastructure, freight yards and logistics facilities, airport aprons and airside environments, large car parks, industrial sites, highways, interchanges, and major transport corridors.

Maintenance access depends on the pole configuration. Some high-mast systems incorporate lowering mechanisms, enabling the headframe and luminaires to be safely brought to ground level or a serviceable height for maintenance. This eliminates the need for elevated access equipment and is often preferred in high-traffic or restricted-access areas. Other installations utilise fixed (non-lowering) headframes, requiring maintenance via elevated work platforms (EWPs) such as telescopic lifters.

Design and specification of high-mast lighting systems typically consider factors such as structural performance under wind and equipment loads, corrosion protection (e.g. hot-dip galvanised finishes), electrical and control integration, and long-term maintenance strategies. Properly engineered systems are designed to meet relevant standards while delivering reliable performance in demanding environments, including coastal and high-wind regions.

== Development history ==
Prior to the 1960s, highway lighting was often provided by shorter (approx. 30 ft (9.1 m)) lighting poles with mercury vapor lamps. Advancements in high-mast illumination took place extensively in the mid-1960s in both Europe and North America. In 1966, the Texas Transportation Institute (TTI) installed a temporary 120 ft (37 m) tall high-mast tower at a highway interchange in Fort Worth, Texas with exceptional results. That same year, TTI and the Texas Highway Department (TxDOT) installed twenty 100 ft (30 m) high-mast lighting towers at two adjacent interchanges on Loop 410 on the northeast side of San Antonio as part of a study to evaluate the benefits and techniques of various types of highway lighting. Each high-mast tower had ten 1,000 watt floodlights. Participants in the San Antonio Illumination Study traveled through the study corridor multiple times over two nights to observe and report impressions of the lighting, after which they were asked to complete a questionnaire about their experience and rate the different types of lighting. The surveys revealed that high-mast lighting was by far the preferred method of lighting.

By 1967, Europe was known to have high-mast illumination technology in practice. 1968 saw the first permanent US installations of high-mast illumination starting in Auburn, Washington south of Seattle. The first American towers were 100 ft (30 m) tall with a fixed-in-place lighting system that could not be lowered. A later project in 1968 featured a 150 ft (46 m) fixed-lighting tower on the Texas-Arkansas state line with two other 100 ft (30 m) fixed-lighting towers on either side of the state-border. By 1969/70, winch systems for the lighting systems were developed and several 175 ft (53 m) towers were installed in Dallas and Houston, followed soon thereafter by 200 ft (61 m) towers. In Canada, 100 ft (30 m) fixed-lighing towers are standard on freeways in the Toronto and Montreal areas. Houston is believed to be the world's leading city of high-mast illumination along its freeways. Despite this, Belgium is considered to have the world's best-lit freeways.

Modern high-mast illumination towers typically range from 125 to 175 ft (38 to 53 m) tall and roughly 700 ft (210 m) in spacing.

Moonlight towers in Austin, Texas served as a major influence on TxDOT's design of some of the first modern high-mast lighting towers in the US during the 1960s and 1970s.

== See also ==
- Light tower (equipment)
