= List of men's association football matches with highest attendance =

Association football, more commonly known as "football" or "soccer" is the most popular sport at 3.5 billion fans. Significant association football attendance records listed below include those with over 100,000 attendance.

== Criteria ==
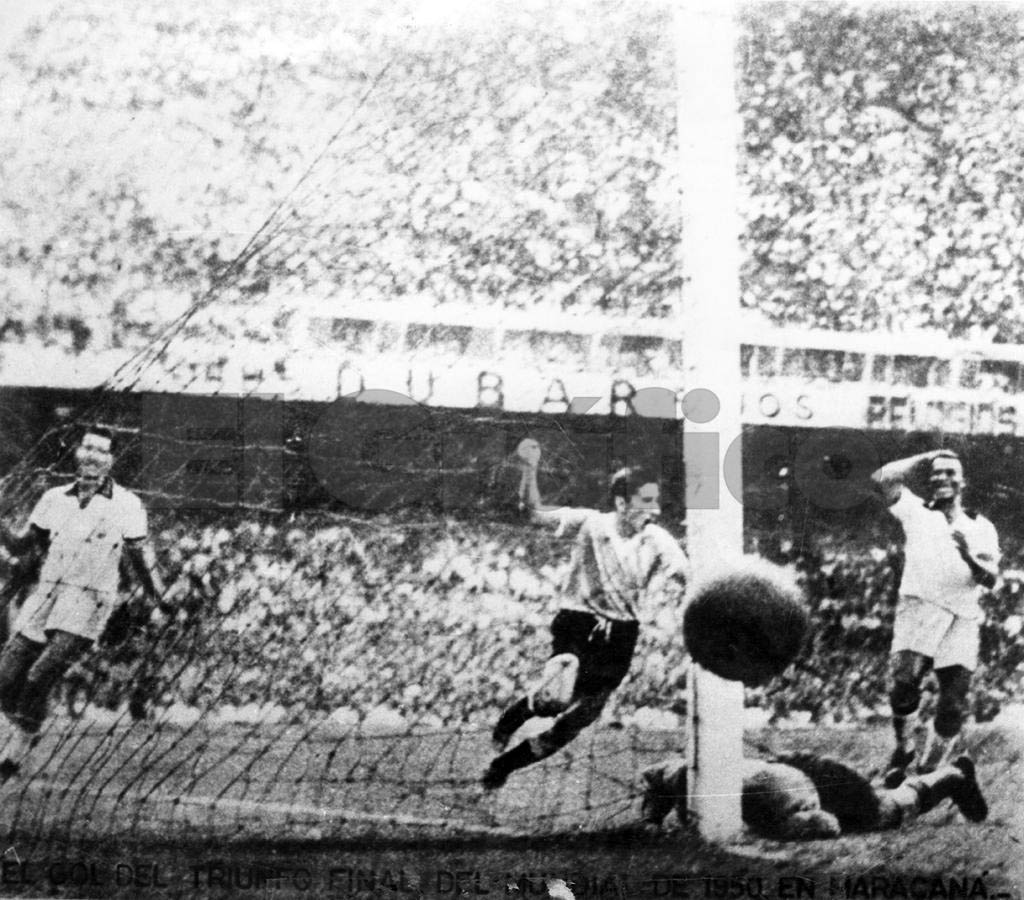
Uruguay v Brazil in the 1950 FIFA World Cup was officially spectated by 173,850 people but also determines there may have been closer to 200,000.

Association football has multiple statuses/types of matches. A definitive list with such available data of significant attendance figures for every match would be impossible to produce; The list therefore includes these types of matches:

- senior domestic leagues
- senior domestic cups
- continental club competitions
- national team matches

In most cases, some attendance figures for a specific match may be different to other sources or claims (e.g. Uruguay v Brazil in the 1950 FIFA World Cup where the official figure is 173,850, but is also claimed as approximately 200,000). Uncertainties around decisions on which figures to include is a major difficulty when recording highest attendances in association football. Therefore; sources of attendance figures include those that are claimed by official reports of match organisers (e.g. FIFA for FIFA tournaments, confederations for their respective tournaments, football associations for their respective competitions, etc.) If such data not available by organisers, next sources are International Federation of Football History & Statistics (IFFHS), then the closest relevant source of the figure.

== Domestic leagues ==
Attendance	Venue	Location	League	Date	Home team	Score	Away team	Ref(s)
194,603	Estadio do Maracanã	Rio de Janeiro, Brazil	(Brazil) Campeonato Carioca	15 December 1963	Flamengo	0–0	Fluminense	
174,770	Estadio do Maracanã	Rio de Janeiro, Brazil	(Brazil) Campeonato Carioca	13 June 1976	Flamengo	1–1	Vasco da Gama	
155,523	Estadio do Maracanã	Rio de Janeiro, Brazil	(Brazil) Campeonato Brasileiro Série A	29 May 1983	Flamengo	3–0	Santos	
150,000	Senayan Main Stadium	Jakarta, Indonesia	(Indonesia) Perserikatan	23 February 1985	Persib	2–2 (1–2)	PSMS	
120,000	Estádio da Luz	Lisbon, Portugal	(Portugal) Primeira Divisão	4 January 1987	Benfica	3–1	Porto	
118,567	Ibrox Park	Glasgow, Scotland	(Scotland) Scottish League Division One	2 January 1939	Rangers	2–1	Celtic	
108,000	Rajko Mitić Stadium	Belgrade, Yugoslavia	(Socialist Federal Republic of Yugoslavia) Yugoslav First League	7 November 1976	Crvena Zvezda	1–0	Partizan	

== Domestic cups ==
Attendance	Venue	Location	Cup	Date	Team 1	Score	Team 2	Ref(s)
147,365	Hampden Park	Glasgow, Scotland	(Scotland) Scottish Cup	24 April 1937	Celtic	2–1	Aberdeen	
143,570	Hampden Park	Glasgow, Scotland	(Scotland) Scottish Cup	27 March 1948	Rangers	1–0	Hibernian	
133,750	Hampden Park	Glasgow, Scotland	(Scotland) Scottish Cup	21 April 1948	Rangers	1–0	Greenock Morton	
132,870	Hampden Park	Glasgow, Scotland	(Scotland) Scottish Cup	26 April 1969	Celtic	4–0	Rangers	
131,781	Salt Lake Stadium	Kolkata, India	(India) Federation Cup	13 July 1997	East Bengal	4–1	Mohun Bagan	
129,176	Hampden Park	Glasgow, Scotland	(Scotland) Scottish Cup	17 April 1948	Rangers	1–1	Greenock Morton	
126,047	Wembley Stadium	London, England	(England) FA Cup	28 April 1923	Bolton Wanderers	2–0	West Ham United	
122,714	Hampden Park	Glasgow, Scotland	(Scotland) Scottish Cup	5 May 1973	Rangers	3–2	Celtic	
121,919	Crystal Palace	London, England	(England) FA Cup	19 April 1913	Aston Villa	1–0	Sunderland	
120,000	Salt Lake Stadium	Kolkata, India	(India) Federation Cup	20 July 1997	East Bengal	1–2	Salgaocar	
118,115	Hampden Park	Glasgow, Scotland	(Scotland) Scottish Cup	14 April 1928	Celtic	4–0	Rangers	
110,820	Crystal Palace	London, England	(England) FA Cup	20 April 1901	Tottenham Hotspur	2–2	Sheffield United	
107,609	Hampden Park	Glasgow, Scotland	(Scotland) Scottish League Cup	23 October 1965	Rangers	1–2	Celtic	
105,907	Hampden Park	Glasgow, Scotland	(Scotland) Scottish League Cup	26 October 1963	Rangers	5–0	Greenock Morton	
101,714	Hampden Park	Glasgow, Scotland	(Scotland) Scottish Cup	21 March 1925	Celtic	5–0	Rangers	
101,117	Crystal Palace	London, England	(England) FA Cup	15 April 1905	Aston Villa	2–0	Newcastle United	

== Continental tournaments ==
Attendance	Venue	Location	Confed.	Tournament	Date	Team 1	Score	Team 2	Ref(s)
136,505	Hampden Park	Glasgow, Scotland	UEFA	European Cup	15 April 1970	(Scotland) Celtic	2–1	(England) Leeds United	
129,690	Santiago Bernabéu Stadium	Madrid, Spain	UEFA	European Cup	19 April 1956	(Spain) Real Madrid	4–2	(Italy) Milan	
127,621	Hampden Park	Glasgow, Scotland	UEFA	European Cup	18 May 1960	(Spain) Real Madrid	7–3	(Germany) Eintracht Frankfurt	
124,000	Santiago Bernabéu Stadium	Madrid, Spain	UEFA	European Cup	30 May 1957	(Spain) Real Madrid	2–0	(Italy) Fiorentina	
121,106	Santiago Bernabéu Stadium	Madrid, Spain	UEFA	European Cup	9 April 1980	(Spain) Real Madrid	2–0	(West Germany) Hamburg	
121,000	Azadi Stadium	Tehran, Iran	AFC	Asian Club Championship	30 April 1999	(Iran) Esteghlal	1–2	(Japan) Júbilo Iwata	
120,000	Santiago Bernabéu Stadium	Madrid, Spain	UEFA	European Cup	11 April 1957	(Spain) Real Madrid	3–1	(England) Manchester United	
120,000	Santiago Bernabéu Stadium	Madrid, Spain	UEFA	European Cup	2 April 1958	(Spain) Real Madrid	4–0	(Hungary) Vasas	
120,000	Santiago Bernabéu Stadium	Madrid, Spain	UEFA	European Cup	15 April 1959	(Spain) Real Madrid	4–0	(Spain) Atlético Madrid	
120,000	Santiago Bernabéu Stadium	Madrid, Spain	UEFA	European Cup	21 April 1960	(Spain) Real Madrid	3–1	(Spain) Barcelona	
120,000	Santiago Bernabéu Stadium	Madrid, Spain	UEFA	European Cup	31 March 1976	(Spain) Real Madrid	1–1	(West Germany) Bayern Munich	
120,000	Camp Nou	Barcelona, Spain	UEFA	European Cup	16 April 1986	(Spain) Barcelona	3–0	(Sweden) IFK Göteborg	
115,000	Santiago Bernabéu Stadium	Madrid, Spain	UEFA	European Cup	7 November 1979	(Spain) Real Madrid	1–0	(Portugal) Porto	
115,000	Camp Nou	Barcelona, Spain	UEFA	European Cup	15 April 1992	(Spain) Barcelona	2–1	(Portugal) Benfica	
115,000	Camp Nou	Barcelona, Spain	UEFA	UEFA Champions League	1 March 1995	(Spain) Barcelona	1–1	(France) Paris Saint-Germain	
115,000	Estadio Azteca	Mexico City, Mexico	CONMEBOL	Copa Libertadores	20 June 2001	(Mexico) Cruz Azul	0–1	(Argentina) Boca Juniors	
114,273	Camp Nou	Barcelona, Spain	UEFA	UEFA Champions League	2 November 1994	(Spain) Barcelona	4–0	(England) Manchester United	
111,000	Santiago Bernabéu Stadium	Madrid, Spain	UEFA	European Cup	25 April 1973	(Spain) Real Madrid	0–1	(Netherlands) Ajax	
110,000	Santiago Bernabéu Stadium	Madrid, Spain	UEFA	European Cup	14 February 1957	(Spain) Real Madrid	3–0	(France) Nice	
110,000	Santiago Bernabéu Stadium	Madrid, Spain	UEFA	European Cup	4 March 1959	(Spain) Atlético Madrid	3–0	(West Germany) Schalke 04	
110,000	Santiago Bernabéu Stadium	Madrid, Spain	UEFA	European Cup	22 March 1962	(Spain) Real Madrid	4–0	(Belgium) Standard Liège	
110,000	Santiago Bernabéu Stadium	Madrid, Spain	UEFA	European Cup	7 May 1964	(Spain) Real Madrid	6–0	(Switzerland) Zürich	
110,000	Rajko Mitić Stadium	Belgrade, Yugoslavia	UEFA	European Cup Winners’ Cup	23 April 1975	(Socialist Federal Republic of Yugoslavia) Crvena Zvezda	2–2	(Hungary) Ferencváros	
110,000	Santiago Bernabéu Stadium	Madrid, Spain	UEFA	European Cup	25 April 1973	(Spain) Real Madrid	0–1	(Netherlands) Ajax	
110,000	Santiago Bernabéu Stadium	Madrid, Spain	UEFA	European Cup	19 March 1980	(Spain) Real Madrid	3–0	(Scotland) Celtic	
106,853	Mineirão	Belo Horizonte, Brazil	CONMEBOL	Copa Libertadores	13 August 1997	(Brazil) Cruzeiro	1–0	(Peru) Sporting Cristal	
105,532	Santiago Bernabéu Stadium	Madrid, Spain	UEFA	European Cup	25 December 1955	(Spain) Real Madrid	4–0	(Socialist Federal Republic of Yugoslavia) Partizan	
105,000	Estádio do Morumbi	São Paulo, Brazil	CONMEBOL	Copa Libertadores	13 August 1997	(Brazil) São Paulo	1–0	(Argentina) Newell's Old Boys	
102,592	Camp Nou	Barcelona, Spain	UEFA	European Cup	5 March 1986	(Spain) Barcelona	1–0	(Italy) Juventus	
102,000	Central Stadium	Kyiv, Ukraine	UEFA	European Cup	6 April 1977	(Soviet Union) Dynamo Kyiv	1–0	(West Germany) Borussia Mönchengladbach	
100,067	Republican Stadium	Kyiv, Ukraine	UEFA	European Cup	22 April 1987	(Soviet Union) Dynamo Kyiv	1–2	(Portugal) Porto	
100,000	Azadi Stadium	Tehran, Iran	AFC	AFC Champions League	8 April 2015	(Iran) Persepolis	1–0	(Saudi Arabia) Al-Nassr	
100,000	Azadi Stadium	Tehran, Iran	AFC	AFC Champions League	6 May 2015	(Iran) Persepolis	2–1	(Uzbekistan) Bunyodkor	
100,000	Azadi Stadium	Tehran, Iran	AFC	AFC Champions League	19 May 2015	(Iran) Persepolis	1–0	(Saudi Arabia) Al Hilal	
100,000	Azadi Stadium	Tehran, Iran	AFC	AFC Champions League	10 November 2018	(Iran) Persepolis	0–0	(Japan) Kashima Antlers	

== Intercontinental tournaments ==
Attendance	Venue	Location	Confed.	Tournament	Date	Team 1	Score	Team 2	Ref(s)
132,728	Maracanã	Rio de Janeiro, Brazil	UEFA-CONMEBOL	Intercontinental Cup	14 November 1963	(Brazil) Santos	4–2	(Italy) Milan	
120,000	El Cilindro	Avellaneda, Argentina	UEFA-CONMEBOL	Intercontinental Cup	1 November 1967	(Argentina) Racing Club	2–1	(Scotland) Celtic	
113,713	Mineirão	Belo Horizonte, Brazil	UEFA-CONMEBOL	Intercontinental Cup	21 December 1976	(Brazil) Cruzeiro	0–0	(Germany) Bayern Munich	

== International matches ==
=== Competitive matches ===
Attendance	Venue	Location	Competition	Date	Team 1	Score	Team 2	Ref(s)
183,341	Estádio do Maracanã	Rio de Janeiro, Brazil	FIFA World Cup qualification	31 August 1969	Brazil	1–0	Paraguay	
173,850	Estádio do Maracanã	Rio de Janeiro, Brazil	FIFA World Cup	16 July 1950	Uruguay	2–1	Brazil	
170,000	Estádio do Maracanã	Rio de Janeiro, Brazil	FIFA World Cup qualification	21 April 1954	Brazil	4–1	Paraguay	
152,772	Estádio do Maracanã	Rio de Janeiro, Brazil	FIFA World Cup	13 July 1950	Brazil	6–1	Spain	
149,407	Hampden Park	Glasgow, Scotland	British Home Championship	17 April 1937	Scotland	3–1	England	
149,269	Hampden Park	Glasgow, Scotland	British Home Championship	15 April 1939	Scotland	1–2	England	
148,068	Estádio do Maracanã	Rio de Janeiro, Brazil	Copa América	16 July 1989	Brazil	1–0	Uruguay	
142,429	Estádio do Maracanã	Rio de Janeiro, Brazil	FIFA World Cup	1 July 1950	Brazil	2–0	Yugoslavia	
141,072	Estádio do Maracanã	Rio de Janeiro, Brazil	FIFA World Cup qualification	3 September 1989	Brazil	1–0	Chile	
138,886	Estádio do Maracanã	Rio de Janeiro, Brazil	FIFA World Cup	9 July 1950	Brazil	7–1	Sweden	
137,438	Hampden Park	Glasgow, Scotland	British Home Championship	25 April 1970	Scotland	0–0	England	
135,376	Hampden Park	Glasgow, Scotland	British Home Championship	10 April 1948	Scotland	0–2	England	
134,544	Hampden Park	Glasgow, Scotland	British Home Championship	3 April 1954	Scotland	2–4	England	
134,504	Hampden Park	Glasgow, Scotland	British Home Championship	5 April 1952	Scotland	1–2	England	
134,461	Hampden Park	Glasgow, Scotland	UEFA European Championship qualifying British Home Championship	24 February 1968	Scotland	1–1	England	
134,170	Hampden Park	Glasgow, Scotland	British Home Championship	1 April 1933	Scotland	2–1	England	
133,300	Hampden Park	Glasgow, Scotland	FIFA World Cup qualification British Home Championship	15 April 1950	Scotland	0–1	England	
133,245	Hampden Park	Glasgow, Scotland	British Home Championship	11 April 1964	Scotland	1–0	England	
132,817	Hampden Park	Glasgow, Scotland	British Home Championship	14 April 1956	Scotland	1–1	England	
132,441	Hampden Park	Glasgow, Scotland	British Home Championship	14 April 1962	Scotland	2–0	England	
130,000	Estádio do Maracanã	Rio de Janeiro, Brazil	Copa América	2 August 1979	Brazil	2–1	Argentina	
130,000	Senayan Stadium	Jakarta, Indonesia	Southeast Asian Games	18 October 1997	Indonesia	1–1	Thailand	
129,810	Hampden Park	Glasgow, Scotland	British Home Championship	28 March 1931	Scotland	2–0	England	
129,693	Hampden Park	Glasgow, Scotland	British Home Championship	6 April 1935	Scotland	2–0	England	
129,193	Hampden Park	Glasgow, Scotland	British Home Championship	9 April 1960	Scotland	1–1	England	
128,000	Azadi Stadium	Tehran, Iran	FIFA World Cup qualification	22 November 1997	Iran	1–1	Australia	
127,874	Hampden Park	Glasgow, Scotland	British Home Championship	19 April 1958	Scotland	0–4	England	
127,307	Hampden Park	Glasgow, Scotland	British Home Championship	23 March 1912	Scotland	1–1	England	
123,052	Hampden Park	Glasgow, Scotland	British Home Championship	2 April 1966	Scotland	3–4	England	
121,452	Hampden Park	Glasgow, Scotland	British Home Championship	4 April 1908	Scotland	1–1	England	
120,000	Santiago Bernabéu Stadium	Madrid, Spain	FIFA World Cup qualification	10 March 1957	Spain	2–2	Switzerland	
120,000	Santiago Bernabéu Stadium	Madrid, Spain	UEFA European Championship qualifying	8 May 1968	Spain	1–2	England	
120,000	Aryamehr Stadium	Tehran, Iran	AFC Asian Cup	13 June 1976	Iran	1–0	Kuwait	
120,000	Stade Omnisports Ahmadou Ahidjo	Yaoundé, Cameroon	Africa Cup of Nations qualificiation	24 April 1983	Cameroon	1–1	Mozambique	
120,000	Cairo International Stadium	Cairo, Egypt	Summer Olympics qualificiation	17 February 1984	Egypt	1–1	Algeria	
120,000	Senayan Stadium	Jakarta, Indonesia	Southeast Asian Games	20 September 1987	Indonesia	1–0	Malaysia	
120,000	Estadio Azteca	Mexico City, Mexico	FIFA World Cup qualification	11 April 1993	Mexico	3–0	Honduras	
120,000	Estadio Azteca	Mexico City, Mexico	FIFA World Cup qualification	18 April 1993	Mexico	3–0	El Salvador	
120,000	Estadio Azteca	Mexico City, Mexico	CONCACAF Gold Cup	25 July 1993	Mexico	4–0	United States	
120,000	Azadi Stadium	Tehran, Iran	FIFA World Cup qualification	19 September 1997	Iran	1–1	Saudi Arabia	
120,000	Senayan Stadium	Jakarta, Indonesia	Southeast Asian Games	16 October 1997	Indonesia	2–1	Singapore	
120,000	Azadi Stadium	Tehran, Iran	FIFA World Cup qualification	24 August 2001	Iran	2–0	Saudi Arabia	
119,325	Hampden Park	Glasgow, Scotland	British Home Championship	27 May 1972	Scotland	1–1	England	
115,000	Zentralstadion	Leipzig, East Germany	FIFA World Cup qualification	24 November 1957	Poland	0–2	Soviet Union	
115,000	Estadio Azteca	Mexico City, Mexico	FIFA World Cup qualification	13 April 1997	Mexico	6–0	Jamaica	
115,000	Estadio Azteca	Mexico City, Mexico	FIFA World Cup qualification	5 October 1997	Mexico	5–0	El Salvador	
115,000	Estadio Azteca	Mexico City, Mexico	FIFA World Cup qualification	2 November 1997	Mexico	0–0	United States	
114,800	Estadio Azteca	Mexico City, Mexico	FIFA World Cup	29 June 1986	Argentina	3–2	West Germany	
114,600	Estadio Azteca	Mexico City, Mexico	FIFA World Cup	7 June 1986	Mexico	1–1	Paraguay	
114,580	Estadio Azteca	Mexico City, Mexico	FIFA World Cup	15 June 1986	Mexico	2–0	Bulgaria	
114,580	Estadio Azteca	Mexico City, Mexico	FIFA World Cup	22 June 1986	Argentina	2–1	England	
114,000	Estadio Azteca	Mexico City, Mexico	FIFA World Cup qualification	6 November 1996	Mexico	3–1	Honduras	
111,214	Hampden Park	Glasgow, Scotland	British Home Championship	2 April 1927	Scotland	1–2	England	
110,512	Hampden Park	Glasgow, Scotland	British Home Championship	13 April 1929	Scotland	1–0	England	
110,446	Estadio Universitario	Mexico City, Mexico	Panamerican Championship	26 February 1956	Mexico	1–1	Costa Rica	
110,420	Estadio Azteca	Mexico City, Mexico	FIFA World Cup	25 June 1986	Argentina	2–0	Belgium	
110,000	Estadio Chamartín	Madrid, Spain	FIFA World Cup qualification	6 January 1954	Spain	4–1	Turkey	
110,000	Leipzig Central Stadium	Leipzig, East Germany	FIFA World Cup qualification	27 October 1957	East Germany	1–4	Czechoslovakia	
110,000	Estadio Azteca	Mexico City, Mexico	FIFA World Cup	3 June 1986	Belgium	1–2	Mexico	
110,000	Estadio Azteca	Mexico City, Mexico	CONCACAF Gold Cup	25 July 1993	Costa Rica	1–1	Jamaica	
110,000	Estadio Azteca	Mexico City, Mexico	FIFA Confederations Cup	4 August 1999	Mexico	4–3	Brazil	
110,000	Estadio Azteca	Mexico City, Mexico	FIFA World Cup qualification	1 July 2001	Mexico	3–0	United States	
108,192	Estadio Azteca	Mexico City, Mexico	FIFA World Cup	11 June 1970	Mexico	1–0	Belgium	
108,000	Estadio Universitario	Mexico City, Mexico	CONCACAF Championship	9 October 1977	Mexico	4–1	Haiti	
107,580	Hampden Park	Glasgow, Scotland	FIFA World Cup qualification	13 October 1965	Scotland	1–2	Poland	
107,412	Estadio Azteca	Mexico City, Mexico	FIFA World Cup	21 June 1970	Brazil	4–1	Italy	
107,160	Estadio Azteca	Mexico City, Mexico	FIFA World Cup	31 May 1970	Mexico	0–0	Soviet Union	
106,462	Estádio Cícero Pompeu de Toledo	São Paulo, Brazil	FIFA World Cup qualification	20 August 1989	Brazil	6–0	Venezuela	
106,205	Hampden Park	Glasgow, Scotland	British Home Championship	2 April 1910	Scotland	2–0	England	
105,405	Estadio Azteca	Mexico City, Mexico	FIFA World Cup qualification	11 November 2001	Mexico	3–0	Honduras	
105,000	Hampden Park	Glasgow, Scotland	British Home Championship	4 April 1914	Scotland	3–1	England	
105,000	Leipzig Central Stadium	Leipzig, East Germany	FIFA World Cup qualification	23 May 1965	East Germany	1–1	Hungary	
105,000	Estadio Azteca	Mexico City, Mexico	Summer Olympics	24 October 1968	Japan	2–0	Mexico	
105,000	Estadio Azteca	Mexico City, Mexico	CONCACAF Championship	12 October 1977	Mexico	3–1	El Salvador	
105,000	Stade Mohammed V	Casablanca, Morocco	FIFA World Cup qualification	10 October 1993	Morocco	1–0	Zambia	
105,000	Estádio da Luz	Lisbon, Portugal	FIFA World Cup qualification	10 November 1993	Portugal	3–0	Estonia	
104,403	Estadio Azteca	Mexico City, Mexico	FIFA World Cup	20 June 1970	Uruguay	0–1	West Germany	
103,763	Estadio Azteca	Mexico City, Mexico	FIFA World Cup	11 June 1986	Iraq	0–1	Mexico	
103,058	Estadio Azteca	Mexico City, Mexico	FIFA World Cup	7 June 1970	Mexico	4–0	El Salvador	
103,000	Luzhniki Stadium	Moscow, Soviet Union	UEFA European Championship qualifying	13 May 1972	Soviet Union	3–0	Yugoslavia	
103,000	Estadio Azteca	Mexico City, Mexico	FIFA World Cup qualification	25 April 1993	Mexico	4–0	Canada	
102,741	Hampden Park	Glasgow, Scotland	British Home Championship	7 April 1906	Scotland	2–1	England	
102,444	Estadio Azteca	Mexico City, Mexico	FIFA World Cup	17 June 1970	Italy	4–3	West Germany	
102,358	Lenin Stadium	Moscow, Soviet Union	FIFA World Cup qualification	13 October 1963	Soviet Union	2–0	Italy	
102,000	Melbourne Cricket Ground	Melbourne, Australia	Summer Olympics	8 December 1956	Soviet Union	1–0	Yugoslavia	
102,000	Lenin Stadium	Moscow, Soviet Union	FIFA World Cup qualification	23 June 1957	Soviet Union	3–0	Poland	
102,000	Lenin Stadium	Moscow, Soviet Union	UEFA European Championship qualifying	18 June 1961	Soviet Union	1–0	Turkey	
102,000	Lenin Stadium	Moscow, Soviet Union	UEFA European Championship qualifying	27 May 1964	Soviet Union	3–1	Sweden	
102,000	Lenin Stadium	Moscow, Soviet Union	UEFA European Championship qualifying	11 May 1968	Soviet Union	3–0	Hungary	
102,000	Lenin Stadium	Moscow, Soviet Union	UEFA European Championship qualifying	30 May 1971	Soviet Union	2–1	Spain	
101,970	Rose Bowl	Pasadena, United States	Summer Olympics	11 August 1984	France	2–0	Brazil	
101,533	Estádio do Maracanã	Rio de Janeiro, Brazil	FIFA World Cup qualification	19 September 1993	Brazil	2–0	Uruguay	
100,572	Luzhniki Stadium	Moscow, Soviet Union	UEFA European Championship qualifying	28 September 1958	Soviet Union	3–1	Hungary	
100,393	Hampden Park	Glasgow, Scotland	FIFA World Cup qualification	9 November 1965	Scotland	1–0	Italy	
100,374	Rose Bowl	Pasadena, United States	Summer Olympics	10 August 1984	Yugoslavia	1–2	Italy	
100,343	Lenin Stadium	Moscow, Soviet Union	FIFA World Cup qualification	1 July 1961	Soviet Union	5–2	Norway	
100,170	Republican Stadium	Kyiv, Ukraine	FIFA World Cup qualification	26 April 1989	Soviet Union	3–0	East Germany	
100,000	Senayan Stadium	Jakarta, Indonesia	AFF Championship	29 December 2002	Indonesia	2–2	Thailand	

=== Minor tournaments ===
Attendance	Venue	Location	Tournament	Date	Home team	Score	Away team	Ref(s)
104,000	Népstadion	Budapest, Hungary	Central European International Cup	16 October 1955	Hungary	6–1	Austria	
101,768	Estádio do Maracanã	Rio de Janeiro, Brazil	Brazil Independence Cup	28 June 1972	Brazil	0–0	Czechoslovakia	

=== International friendlies ===
Attendance	Venue	Location	Date	Home team	Score	Away team	Ref(s)
160,000	Estadio do Maracanã	Rio de Janeiro, Brazil	13 May 1959	Brazil	2–0	England	
150,289	Estadio do Maracanã	Rio de Janeiro, Brazil	21 March 1982	Brazil	1–0	West Germany	
150,000	May Day Stadium	Pyongyang, North Korea	11 October 1990	North Korea	2–1	South Korea	
143,315	Estadio do Maracanã	Rio de Janeiro, Brazil	6 June 1965	Brazil	2–0	West Germany	
140,000	Estadio do Maracanã	Rio de Janeiro, Brazil	14 May 1958	Brazil	4–0	Bulgaria	
138,575	Estadio do Maracanã	Rio de Janeiro, Brazil	18 July 1971	Brazil	2–2	Yugoslavia	
130,872	Estadio do Maracanã	Rio de Janeiro, Brazil	9 May 1962	Brazil	1–0	Portugal	
125,683	Hampden Park	Glasgow, Scotland	27 April 1949	Scotland	2–0	France	
125,000	Santiago Bernabéu Stadium	Madrid, Spain	17 March 1955	Spain	1–2	France	
125,000	Santiago Bernabéu Stadium	Madrid, Spain	18 May 1955	Spain	1–1	England	
123,751	Hampden Park	Glasgow, Scotland	26 April 1950	Scotland	3–1	Switzerland	
123,132	Estádio do Morumbi	São Paulo, Brazil	1 May 1974	Brazil	0–0	Austria	
120,000	Santiago Bernabéu Stadium	Madrid, Spain	15 October 1958	Spain	6–2	Northern Ireland	
117,998	Estadio do Maracanã	Rio de Janeiro, Brazil	1 July 1956	Brazil	2–0	Italy	
115,000	Estadio Monumental	Buenos Aires, Argentina	24 July 1960	Argentina	2–0	Spain	
114,000	Estadio Azteca	Mexico City, Mexico	22 December 1993	Mexico	0–0	Germany	
113,248	Estadio do Maracanã	Rio de Janeiro, Brazil	21 November 1965	Brazil	2–2	Soviet Union	
113,146	Hampden Park	Glasgow, Scotland	8 December 1954	Scotland	2–4	Hungary	
111,899	Hampden Park	Glasgow, Scotland	15 May 1946	Scotland	3–1	Switzerland	
110,000	Azadi Stadium	Tehran, Iran	9 October 2004	Iran	0–2	Germany	
109,380	Estadio do Maracanã	Rio de Janeiro, Brazil	8 June 1966	Brazil	2–1	Poland	
107,765	Hampden Park	Glasgow, Scotland	30 April 1952	Scotland	6–0	United States	
107,060	Estádio do Morumbi	São Paulo, Brazil	3 March 1982	Brazil	1–1	Czechoslovakia	
106,066	Estadio do Maracanã	Rio de Janeiro, Brazil	12 June 1977	Brazil	1–1	West Germany	
105,649	Estadio do Maracanã	Rio de Janeiro, Brazil	12 June 1969	Brazil	2–1	England	
105,000	Olympiastadion	Berlin, Germany	14 May 1938	Germany	3–6	England	
105,000	Estadio Azteca	Mexico City, Mexico	1 June 1969	Mexico	0–0	England	
103,415	Hampden Park	Glasgow, Scotland	6 May 1959	Scotland	3–2	West Germany	
103,000	Népstadion	Budapest, Hungary	25 September 1955	Hungary	1–1	Soviet Union	
103,000	Lenin Stadium	Moscow, Soviet Union	27 April 1962	Soviet Union	5–0	Uruguay	
103,000	Estadio Azteca	Mexico City, Mexico	11 August 2010	Mexico	1–1	Spain	
102,462	Estadio do Maracanã	Rio de Janeiro, Brazil	15 June 1966	Brazil	2–2	Czechoslovakia	
102,196	Estadio do Maracanã	Rio de Janeiro, Brazil	2 June 1965	Brazil	5–0	Belgium	
102,000	Lenin Stadium	Moscow, Soviet Union	18 May 1958	Soviet Union	1–1	England	
102,000	Népstadion	Budapest, Hungary	29 May 1955	Hungary	3–1	Scotland	
102,000	Lenin Stadium	Moscow, Soviet Union	23 September 1956	Soviet Union	0–1	Hungary	
102,000	Lenin Stadium	Moscow, Soviet Union	18 May 1958	Soviet Union	1–1	England	
102,000	Lenin Stadium	Moscow, Soviet Union	6 September 1959	Soviet Union	3–1	Czechoslovakia	
102,000	Lenin Stadium	Moscow, Soviet Union	10 September 1961	Soviet Union	0–1	Austria	
102,000	Lenin Stadium	Moscow, Soviet Union	4 July 1965	Soviet Union	0–3	Brazil	
102,000	Lenin Stadium	Moscow, Soviet Union	5 June 1966	Soviet Union	3–3	France	

== See also ==
- List of women's association football matches with highest attendance
