= List of women's association football matches with highest attendance =

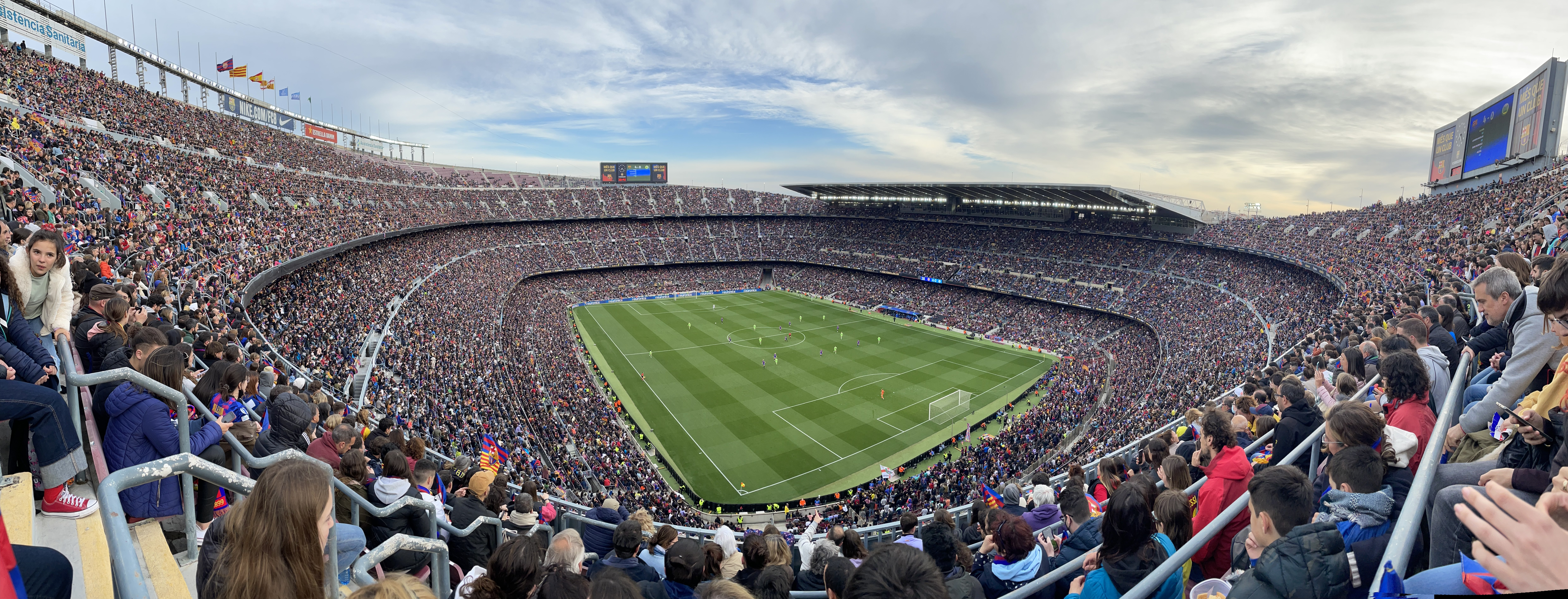
The FIFA record attendance for a women's football match set at Camp Nou on 22 April 2022

Women's association football is a popular sport, though less watched than the equivalent men's game in most markets. In the early 20th century, women's football thrived in England, seeing crowds equal to or larger than men's football matches; between the 1920s and 1970s, women's football was banned from existing in official capacities in England and various other regions, setting it back. While most men's association football attendance records were set in the 20th century, record crowds in the women's game have been set predominantly in the 21st century.

The record attendance of a women's football match is the estimated 110,000 attendance at Estadio Azteca for the final of the 1971 Women's World Cup (organised by the Federation of Independent European Female Football (FIEFF)) between the national teams of Mexico and Denmark on 5 September 1971.

The record attendance of a match recognised by FIFA is 91,648, set during a UEFA Women's Champions League match between Barcelona Femení and Wolfsburg at the Camp Nou on 22 April 2022.

Barcelona also played, against Atlético Madrid, in a match at the Metropolitano Stadium, which until 2026 held the domestic league attendance record of 60,739. Including records not officially recognised by FIFA due to unsanctioned matches, five teams have each set the world record attendance the most times, with three each: Dick, Kerr Ladies F.C., Mexico, China, United States, and Barcelona.

== Domestic leagues ==
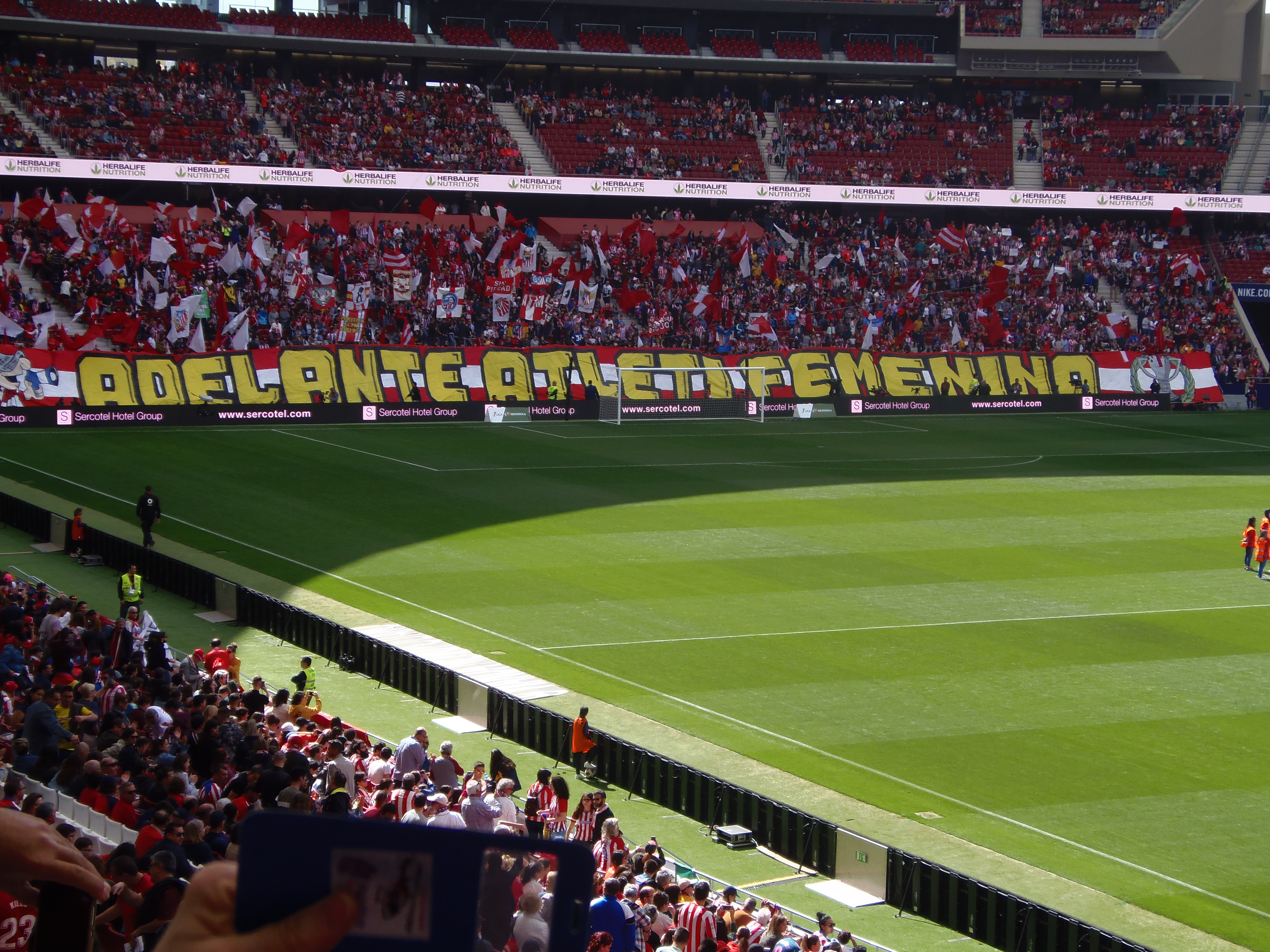
The home end ahead of the domestic women's league then-record attendance set at the Metropolitano Stadium on 17 March 2019

Date	Home team	Score	Away team	League (season)	Venue	Attendance	Ref(s)
28 March 2026	Denver Summit FC	0–0	Washington Spirit	(United States) NWSL	(United States) Empower Field at Mile High, Denver	63,004	
17 March 2019	Atlético Madrid	0–2	Barcelona	(Spain) Iberdrola	(Spain) Metropolitano Stadium, Madrid	60,739	
17 February 2024	Arsenal	3–1	Manchester United	(England) WSL	(United Kingdom) Emirates Stadium, London	60,160	
3 March 2024	Arsenal	1–0	Tottenham	(England) WSL	(United Kingdom) Emirates Stadium, London	60,050	
10 December 2023	Arsenal	4–1	Chelsea	(England) WSL	(United Kingdom) Emirates Stadium, London	59,042	
5 June 2023	América	2–1	Pachuca	(Mexico) Liga MX Femenil	Estadio Azteca, Mexico City	58,156	
6 September 2025	Bayern Munich	2–0	Bayer 04 Leverkusen	(Germany) Frauen-Bundesliga	(Germany) Allianz Arena, Munich	57,762	
29 July 2023	Porcinas	2–3	PIO	(Spain) Queens League	(Spain) Metropolitano Stadium, Madrid	57,326 (Note: Considered unrecognised by FIFA due to format or match not sanctioned by its formal regulations (e.g., non-regulation pitch size or game duration).) (Note: Queens League plays seven-a-side football.) (Note: As part of a double-header or other event also featuring men's football matches.)	
29 July 2023	xBuyer Team	3–5	Las Troncas	(Spain) Queens League	(Spain) Metropolitano Stadium, Madrid	57,326	
29 July 2023	PIO	3–1	Las Troncas	(Spain) Queens League	(Spain) Metropolitano Stadium, Madrid	57,326	
16 February 2025	Arsenal	5–0	Tottenham Hotspur	(England) WSL	(United Kingdom) Emirates Stadium, London	56,786	
8 November 2011	Arsenal	1–1	Chelsea	(England) WSL	(United Kingdom) Emirates Stadium, London	56,537	
1 October 2023	Arsenal	0–1	Liverpool	(England) WSL	(United Kingdom) Emirates Stadium, London	54,115	
11 November 2022	América	0–1	Tigres	(Mexico) Liga MX Femenil	Estadio Azteca, Mexico City	52,654	
4 May 2018	Monterrey	2–2 (2–4 p)	Tigres	(Mexico) Liga MX Femenil	(Mexico) Estadio BBVA, Guadalupe	51,211	
24 September 2022	Arsenal	4–0	Tottenham	(England) WSL	(United Kingdom) Emirates Stadium, London	47,367	
15 January 2023	Arsenal	1–1	Chelsea	(England) WSL	(United Kingdom) Emirates Stadium, London	46,811	
10 May 2025	Arsenal	4–3	Manchester United	(England) WSL	(United Kingdom) Emirates Stadium, London	46,603	
28 March 2026	Arsenal	5–2	Tottenham Hotspur	(England) WSL	(United Kingdom) Emirates Stadium, London	46,123	
12 October 2024	Arsenal	5–0	Chelsea	(England) WSL	(United Kingdom) Emirates Stadium, London	45,860	
22 September 2024	Corinthians	1–0	São Paulo	(Brazil) Campeonato Brasileiro	(Brazil) Arena Corinthians, São Paulo	44,136	
21 April 2024	Arsenal	3–0	Leicester City	(England) WSL	(United Kingdom) Emirates Stadium, London	42,820	
10 September 2023	Corinthians	2–1	Ferroviária	(Brazil) Campeonato Brasileiro	(Brazil) Arena Corinthians, São Paulo	42,326	
7 November 2022	Monterrey	2–2	Tigres	(Mexico) Liga MX Femenil	(Mexico) Estadio BBVA, Guadalupe	42,315	
15 July 2026	Gotham FC	1–0	Washington Spirit	(United States) NWSL	(United States) Citi Field, New York City	42,175	
2 September 2023	Universitario	2–0	Alianza Lima	(Peru) Liga Femenina	(Peru) Estadio Monumental, Lima	42,107	
3 June 2023	OL Reign	0–2	Portland Thorns	(United States) NWSL	(United States) Lumen Field, Seattle	42,054	
22 September 2024	Arsenal	2–2	Manchester City	(England) WSL	(United Kingdom) Emirates Stadium, London	41,818	
14 November 2022	Tigres	2–0	América	(Mexico) Liga MX Femenil	(Mexico) El Volcán, Monterrey	41,615	
14 September 2024	Corinthians	1–0	Cruzeiro	(Brazil) Campeonato Brasileiro	(Brazil) Arena Corinthians, São Paulo	41,130	
24 September 2022	Corinthians	4–1	Internacional	(Brazil) Campeonato Brasileiro	(Brazil) Arena Corinthians, São Paulo	41,070	
19 November 2022	Arsenal	2–3	Manchester United	(England) WSL	(United Kingdom) Emirates Stadium, London	40,604	
4 October 2026	Barcelona	7–0	Real Madrid	(Spain) Liga F	(Spain) Camp Nou, Barcelona	40,533	
23 August 2025	Bay FC	2–3	Washington Spirit	(United States) NWSL	(United States) Oracle Park, San Francisco	40,091	
20 November 2023	Tigres	1–0	Monterrey	(Mexico) Liga MX Femenil	(Mexico) El Volcán, Monterrey	40,039	
8 February 2026	Arsenal	1–0	Manchester City	(England) WSL	(United Kingdom) Emirates Stadium, London	39,155	
19 November 2023	Barcelona	5–0	Real Madrid	(Spain) Liga F	(Spain) Estadi Olímpic Lluís Companys, Barcelona	38,707	
23 March 2025	Newcastle United	1–0	Sunderland	(England) Women's Championship	(United Kingdom) St James' Park, Newcastle	38,502	
23 April 2023	Köln	0–2	Eintracht Frankfurt	(Germany) Frauen-Bundesliga	(Germany) RheinEnergieStadion, Cologne	38,365	
17 November 2019	Tottenham	0–2	Arsenal	(England) WSL	(United Kingdom) Tottenham Hotspur Stadium, London	38,262	
6 September 2025	Arsenal	4–1	London City Lionesses	(England) WSL	(United Kingdom) Emirates Stadium, London	38,142	
10 January 2026	Arsenal	0–0	Manchester United	(England) WSL	(United Kingdom) Emirates Stadium, London	37,627	
4 November 2022	Tigres	2–1	Monterrey	(Mexico) Liga MX Femenil	(Mexico) El Volcán, Monterrey	36,509	
18 September 2022	Internacional	1–1	Corinthians	(Brazil) Campeonato Brasileiro	(Brazil) Estádio Beira-Rio, Porto Alegre	36,330	
15 October 2023	Arsenal	2–1	Aston Villa	(England) WSL	(United Kingdom) Emirates Stadium, London	35,829	
23 March 2025	Barcelona	1–3	Real Madrid	(Spain) Liga F	(Spain) Estadi Olímpic Lluís Companys, Barcelona	35,812	
28 March 2026	Les Marseillaises	1–2	Montpellier HSC	(France) Première Ligue	(France) Stade Vélodrome, Marseille	35,713	
22 March 2025	Arsenal	4–0	Liverpool	(England) WSL	(United Kingdom) Emirates Stadium, London	35,628	
8 June 2024	Chicago Red Stars	1–2	Bay FC	(United States) NWSL	(United States) Wrigley Field, Chicago	35,038	
27 April 2003	Athletic Club	5–0	Híspalis	(Spain) Superliga	(Spain) San Mamés Stadium, Bilbao	35,000	
6 December 2025	Arsenal	2–1	Liverpool	(England) WSL	(United Kingdom) Emirates Stadium, London	34,345	
15 April 2001	Washington Freedom	1–0	Bay Area CyberRays	(United States) WUSA	(United States) RFK Memorial Stadium, Washington, D.C.	34,148	
6 October 2023	OL Reign	0–0	Washington Spirit	(United States) NWSL	(United States) Lumen Field, Seattle	34,130	
5 January 2020	Athletic Club	0–3	Barcelona	(Spain) Iberdrola	(Spain) San Mamés Stadium, Bilbao	32,068	
23 March 2024	San Diego Wave	1–2	Kansas City	(United States) NWSL	(United States) Snapdragon Stadium, San Diego	32,066	
17 September 2022	San Diego Wave	1–0	Angel City	(United States) NWSL	(United States) Snapdragon Stadium, San Diego	32,000	
30 September 2022	Tigres	2–2	Monterrey	(Mexico) Liga MX Femenil	(Mexico) El Volcán, Monterrey	31,537	
7 September 2019	Manchester City	1–0	Manchester United	(England) WSL	(United Kingdom) City of Manchester Stadium, Manchester	31,213	
25 March 2023	Monterrey	1–1	Tigres	(Mexico) Liga MX Femenil	(Mexico) Estadio BBVA, Guadalupe	30,877	
25 March 2023	San Diego Wave	3–2	Chicago Red Stars	(United States) NWSL	(United States) Snapdragon Stadium, San Diego	30,854	
16 November 2019	OL Lyonnes	1–0	Paris Saint-Germain	(France) Division 1	(France) Parc Olympique Lyonnais, Lyon	30,661	
24 January 2026	Chelsea	0–2	Arsenal	(England) WSL	(United Kingdom) Emirates Stadium, London	30,545	
15 October 2023	San Diego Wave	2–0	Racing Louisville	(United States) NWSL	(United States) Snapdragon Stadium, San Diego	30,312	
4 November 2022	América	3–1	Guadalajara	(Mexico) Liga MX Femenil	Estadio Azteca, Mexico City	30,274	
30 June 2001	Washington Freedom	2–0	Carolina Courage	(United States) WUSA	(United States) RFK Memorial Stadium, Washington, D.C.	30,271	

== Domestic cups ==
Date	Team 1	Score	Team 2	Match	Venue	Attendance	Ref(s)
14 May 2023	Chelsea	1–0	Manchester United	FA Cup final	(United Kingdom) Wembley Stadium, London	77,390	
12 May 2024	Manchester United	4–0	Tottenham Hotspur	FA Cup final	(United Kingdom) Wembley Stadium, London	76,082	
18 May 2025	Chelsea	3–0	Manchester United	FA Cup final	(United Kingdom) Wembley Stadium, London	74,412	
23 March 2025	Hamburger SV	1–3 (a.e.t.)	Werder Bremen	DFB-Pokal Frauen semi-final	(Germany) Volksparkstadion, Hamburg	57,000	
25 November 2024	Monterrey	3–2 (4–3 p aggregate)	Tigres	Liga MX Femenil Apertura final	(Mexico) Estadio BBVA, Guadalupe	50,008	
15 May 2022	Chelsea	3–2	Manchester City	FA Cup final	(United Kingdom) Wembley Stadium, London	49,094	
30 January 2019	Athletic Club	0–2	Atlético Madrid	Copa de la Reina quarter-final	(Spain) San Mamés Stadium, Bilbao	48,121	
5 May 2018	Chelsea	3–1	Arsenal	FA Cup final	(United Kingdom) Wembley Stadium, London	45,423	
1 May 2025	Bayern Munich	4–2	Werder Bremen	DFB-Pokal Frauen final	(Germany) RheinEnergieStadion, Köln	45,146	
18 May 2023	Wolfsburg	4–1	Freiburg	DFB-Pokal Frauen final	(Germany) RheinEnergieStadion, Köln	44,808	
9 May 2024	Bayern Munich	0–2	Wolfsburg	DFB-Pokal Frauen final	(Germany) RheinEnergieStadion, Köln	44,000	
4 May 2019	Manchester City	3–0	West Ham United	FA Cup final	(United Kingdom) Wembley Stadium, London	43,264	
21 March 1971	Espanyol	2–1	Sabadell	Catalunya Copa Pernod semi-final	(Spain) Sarrià Stadium, Barcelona	41,000	
21 March 1971	UE Sant Andreu	0–1	Barcelona	Catalunya Copa Pernod semi-final	(Spain) Sarrià Stadium, Barcelona	41,000	
5 December 2021	Chelsea	3–0	Arsenal	FA Cup final	(United Kingdom) Wembley Stadium, London	40,942	
13 May 2017	Manchester City	4–1	Birmingham City	FA Cup final	(United Kingdom) Wembley Stadium, London	35,271	
14 May 2016	Arsenal	1–0	Chelsea	FA Cup final	(United Kingdom) Wembley Stadium, London	32,912	
5 November 2023	San Diego Wave FC	0–1	OL Reign	NWSL championship semi-final	(United States) Snapdragon Stadium, San Diego	32,262	
1 August 2015	Chelsea	1–0	Notts County	FA Cup final	(United Kingdom) Wembley Stadium, London	30,710	
14 October 2023	Aniquiladoras	0–0 (2–1 p)	PIO	Queens Cup semi-final	(Spain) La Rosaleda Stadium, Málaga	30,044	
14 October 2023	Saiyans	1–2	Aniquiladoras	Queens Cup final	(Spain) La Rosaleda Stadium, Málaga	30,044	
28 March 1971	Sant Andreu	2–1	Sabadell	Catalunya Copa Pernod third-place play-off	(Spain) Camp Nou, Barcelona	30,000	
28 March 1971	Barcelona	1–2	Espanyol	Catalunya Copa Pernod final	(Spain) Camp Nou, Barcelona	30,000	
23 May 2010	Athletic Club	0–2	Barcelona	Copa de la Reina quarter-final	(Spain) San Mamés Stadium, Bilbao	30,000	

== Continental tournaments ==
Date	Team 1	Score	Team 2	Match	Venue	Attendance	Ref(s)
22 April 2022	(Spain) Barcelona	5–1	(Germany) Wolfsburg	Champions League semi-final	(Spain) Camp Nou, Barcelona	91,648	
30 March 2022	(Spain) Barcelona	5–2	(Spain) Real Madrid	Champions League quarter-final	(Spain) Camp Nou, Barcelona	91,553	
27 April 2023	(Spain) Barcelona	1–1	(England) Chelsea	Champions League semi-final	(Spain) Camp Nou, Barcelona	72,262	
2 Apr 2026	(Spain) Barcelona	6–0	(Spain) Real Madrid	Champions League quarter-final	(Spain) Camp Nou, Barcelona	60,067	
2 May 2023	(England) Arsenal	2–3	(Germany) Wolfsburg	Champions League semi-final	(United Kingdom) Emirates Stadium, London	60,063	
29 March 2023	(Spain) Barcelona	5–1	(Italy) Roma	Champions League quarter-final	(Spain) Camp Nou, Barcelona	54,667	
25 May 2024	(Spain) Barcelona	2–0	(France) Olympique Lyonnais	Champions League final	(Spain) San Mamés Stadium, Bilbao	50,827	
17 May 2012	(France) Olympique Lyonnais	2–0	(Germany) Eintracht Frankfurt	Champions League final	(Germany) Olympiastadion, Munich	50,212	
24 May 2025	(United Kingdom) Arsenal	1–0	(Spain) Barcelona	Champions League final	(Portugal) Estádio José Alvalade, Lisbon	50,095	
24 November 2022	(Spain) Barcelona	3–0	(Germany) Bayern Munich	Champions League group stage	(Spain) Camp Nou, Barcelona	46,967	
30 April 2022	(France) Paris Saint-Germain	1–2	(France) Olympique Lyonnais	Champions League semi-final	(France) Parc des Princes, Paris	43,255	
19 Apr 2025	(England) Arsenal	1–2	(France) Olympique Lyonnais	Champions League semi-final	(England) Emirates Stadium, London	40,045	
21 May 2022	(Spain) Barcelona	1–3	(France) Olympique Lyonnais	Champions League final	(Italy) Juventus Stadium, Turin	39,454	
21 March 2023	(England) Chelsea	0–2	(Spain) Barcelona	Champions League semi-final	(United Kingdom) Stamford Bridge, Fulham	39,398	

== International matches ==
=== Competitive matches ===
Date	Team 1	Score	Team 2	Match	Venue	Attendance	Ref(s)
5 September 1971	Mexico	0–3	Denmark	Mundial final	Estadio Azteca, Mexico City	110,000 (Note: This event, organised without FIFA approval, was not officially recognised. Attendance figures are estimates. Azteca Stadium during the previous year's 1970 FIFA World Cup hosted six men's matches with attendances over 102,000.)	
10 July 1999	United States	0–0 (a.e.t./g.g.) (5–4 p)	China	World Cup final	(United States) Rose Bowl, Los Angeles	90,185	
10 July 1999	Brazil	0–0 (5–4 p)	Norway	World Cup Third place match	(United States) Rose Bowl, Los Angeles	90,185	
15 August 1971	Mexico	3–1	Argentina	Mundial group stage	Estadio Azteca, Mexico City	90,000	
22 August 1971	Mexico	4–0	(United Kingdom) England	Mundial group stage	Estadio Azteca, Mexico City	90,000	
31 July 2022	England	2–1	Germany	Euro final	(United Kingdom) Wembley Stadium, London	87,192	
6 April 2023	England	1–1 (4–2 p)	Brazil	Finalissima	(United Kingdom) Wembley Stadium, London	83,132	
9 August 2012	United States	2–1	Japan	Olympics final	(United Kingdom) Wembley Stadium, London	80,203	
29 August 1971	Mexico	2–1	Italy	Mundial semi-final	Estadio Azteca, Mexico City	80,000	
19 June 1999	United States	3–0	Denmark	World Cup group stage	(United States) Giants Stadium, East Rutherford	78,972	
19 June 1999	Brazil	7–1	Mexico	World Cup group stage	(United States) Giants Stadium, East Rutherford	78,972	
1 August 1996	China	1–2	United States	Olympics final	(United States) Sanford Stadium, Athens, Georgia	76,489	
1 August 1996	Brazil	0–2	Norway	Olympics Third place match	(United States) Sanford Stadium, Athens, Georgia	76,489	
5 July 2003	Mexico	2–2	Japan	World Cup qualification	Azteca Stadium, Mexico City	75,000	
20 July 2023	Australia	1–0	Republic of Ireland	World Cup group stage	Stadium Australia, Sydney	75,784	
7 August 2023	Australia	2–0	Denmark	World Cup Round of 16	Stadium Australia, Sydney	75,784	
12 August 2023	England	2–1	Colombia	World Cup quarter-final	Stadium Australia, Sydney	75,784	
16 August 2023	Australia	1–3	England	World Cup semi-final	Stadium Australia, Sydney	75,784	
20 August 2023	Spain	1–0	England	World Cup final	Stadium Australia, Sydney	75,784	
26 June 2011	Germany	2–1	Canada	World Cup group stage	(Germany) Olympiastadion, Berlin	73,680	
4 July 1999	United States	2–0	Brazil	World Cup semi-final	(United States) Stanford Stadium, Palo Alto, California	73,123	
1 December 2023	England	3–2	Netherlands	Nations League group stage	(United Kingdom) Wembley Stadium, London	71,632	
31 July 2012	(United Kingdom) Great Britain	1–0	Brazil	Olympics group stage	(United Kingdom) Wembley Stadium, London	70,584	
16 August 2016	Brazil	0–0 (3–4 p)	Sweden	Olympics semi-final	(Brazil) Maracanã Stadium, Rio de Janeiro	70,454	
6 July 2022	England	1–0	Austria	Euro group stage	(United Kingdom) Old Trafford, Manchester	68,871	
24 June 1999	United States	7–1	Nigeria	World Cup group stage	(United States) Soldier Field, Chicago	65,080	
24 June 1999	Brazil	2–0	Italy	World Cup group stage	(United States) Soldier Field, Chicago	65,080	
16 November 1991	China	4–0	Norway	World Cup group stage	(China) Tianhe Stadium, Guangzhou	65,000	
28 July 1996	Norway	1–2 (a.e.t.)	United States	Olympics semi-final	(United States) Sanford Stadium, Athens, Georgia	64,196	
28 July 1996	China	3–2	Brazil	Olympics semi-final	(United States) Sanford Stadium, Athens, Georgia	64,196	
5 April 2024	England	1–1	Sweden	UEFA Women's Euro qualifying	(United Kingdom) Wembley Stadium, London	63,428	
30 November 1991	Norway	1–2	United States	World Cup final	(China) Tianhe Stadium, Guangzhou	63,000	
14 April 2026	England	1–0	Spain	World Cup qualification	(United Kingdom) Wembley Stadium, London	62,306	
6 August 2012	France	1–2	Japan	Olympics semi-final	(United Kingdom) Wembley Stadium, London	61,482	
29 October 2023	Philippines	0–8	Australia	Olympic Qualifying	(Australia) Perth Stadium, Perth	59,155	
13 September 2000	Sweden	0–2	Brazil	Olympics group stage	(Australia) Melbourne Cricket Ground, Melbourne	58,432	
7 July 2019	United States	2–0	Netherlands	World Cup final	(France) Parc Olympique Lyonnais, Lyon	57,900	
2 December 2025	Spain	3–0	Germany	UEFA Women's Nations League Finals	(Spain) Metropolitano Stadium, Madrid	55,843	
20 September 2007	China	2–0	New Zealand	World Cup group stage	(China) Tianjin Olympic Centre Stadium, Tianjin	55,832	
25 July 1996	United States	0–0	China	Olympics group stage	(United States) Orange Bowl, Miami	55,650	
24 November 1991	China	0–1	Sweden	World Cup quarter-final	(China) Tianhe Stadium, Guangzhou	55,000	
1 July 1999	United States	3–2	Germany	World Cup quarter-final	(United States) Jack Kent Cooke Stadium, Landover, Maryland	54,642	
1 July 1999	Brazil	4–3 (a.e.t./g.g.)	Nigeria	World Cup quarter-final	(United States) Jack Kent Cooke Stadium, Landover, Maryland	54,642	
28 February 2024	Australia	10–0	Uzbekistan	Olympic Qualifying	(Australia) Marvel Stadium, Melbourne	54,120	
27 June 2015	England	2–1	Canada	World Cup quarter-final	(Canada) BC Place, Vancouver	54,027	
15 September 2007	Brazil	4–0	China	World Cup group stage	(China) Wuhan Sports Centre Stadium, Wuhan	54,000	
15 September 2007	Denmark	2–0	New Zealand	World Cup group stage	(China) Wuhan Sports Centre Stadium, Wuhan	54,000	
21 June 2015	Canada	1–0	Switzerland	World Cup Round of 16	(Canada) BC Place, Vancouver	53,855	
26 September 2007	Germany	3–0	Norway	World Cup semi-final	(China) Tianjin Olympic Centre Stadium, Tianjin	53,819	
2 July 2019	England	1–2	United States	World Cup semi-final	(France) Parc Olympique Lyonnais, Lyon	53,512	
5 July 2015	United States	5–2	Japan	World Cup final	(Canada) BC Place, Vancouver	53,341	
12 August 2016	Brazil	0–0 (7–6 p)	Australia	Olympics quarter-final	(Brazil) Mineirão, Belo Horizonte	52,660	
9 August 2008	Canada	1–1	China	Olympics group stage	(China) Tianjin Olympic Centre Stadium, Tianjin	52,600	
19 August 2016	Sweden	1–2	Germany	Olympics final	(Brazil) Maracanã Stadium, Rio de Janeiro	52,432	
16 June 2015	Nigeria	0–1	United States	World Cup group stage	(Canada) BC Place, Vancouver	52,193	
23 September 2007	Norway	1–0	China	World Cup quarter-final	(China) Wuhan Sports Centre Stadium, Wuhan	52,000	
21 August 2008	Brazil	0–1 (a.e.t.)	United States	Olympics final	(China) Beijing Workers' Stadium, Beijing	51,612	
30 June 2015	United States	2–0	Germany	World Cup semi-final	(Canada) Olympic Stadium, Montreal	51,176	
12 August 2008	Sweden	2–1	Canada	Olympics group stage	(China) Beijing Workers' Stadium, Beijing	51,112	
12 August 2008	Nigeria	1–3	Brazil	Olympics group stage	(China) Beijing Workers' Stadium, Beijing	51,112	
18 August 2008	United States	4–2	Japan	Olympics semi-final	(China) Beijing Workers' Stadium, Beijing	50,937	
12 September 2007	China	3–2	Denmark	World Cup group stage	(China) Wuhan Sports Centre Stadium, Wuhan	50,800	
12 September 2007	New Zealand	0–5	Brazil	World Cup group stage	(China) Wuhan Sports Centre Stadium, Wuhan	50,800	
27 June 1999	United States	3–0	North Korea	World Cup group stage	(United States) Foxboro Stadium, Foxborough, Massachusetts	50,484	
27 June 1999	Mexico	0–2	Italy	World Cup group stage	(United States) Foxboro Stadium, Foxborough, Massachusetts	50,484	
4 September 1971	Italy	4–0	Argentina	Mundial Third place match	(Mexico) Estadio Jalisco, Guadalajara	50,000	

=== International friendlies ===
Date	Home team	Score	Away team	Venue	Attendance	Ref(s)
30 November 2024	England	0–0	United States	(United Kingdom) Wembley Stadium, London	78,346	
9 November 2019	England	1–2	Germany	(United Kingdom) Wembley Stadium, London	77,768	
7 October 2022	England	2–1	United States	(United Kingdom) Wembley Stadium, London	76,893	
3 June 2024	Australia	2–0	China	Stadium Australia, Sydney	76,798	
29 November 2025	England	8–0	China	(United Kingdom) Wembley Stadium, London	74,611	
31 May 2024	Australia	1–1	China	(Australia) Adelaide Oval, Adelaide	52,912	
6 April 2024	United States	2–1	Japan	(United States) Mercedes-Benz Stadium, Atlanta	50,644	
14 July 2022	Australia	1–0	France	(Australia) Marvel Stadium, Melbourne	50,629	
23 November 2014	England	0–3	Germany	(United Kingdom) Wembley Stadium, London	45,619	

== World record progression ==
Since the first record attendance for a women's football match was set in the early 20th century, it has been superseded several times. In various nations, women's football was banned for roughly the same period, from the 1920s to the 1970s.

Date	Team 1	Score	Team 2	Match	Venue	Attendance
25 December 1917	(England) Dick, Kerr Ladies	4–0	(England) Arundel Coulthard Factory	Charity friendly	(United Kingdom) Deepdale, Preston	10,000
26 December 1917	(Northern Ireland) North of Ireland	1–4	(Tyne and Wear) Tyneside	Friendly	(Northern Ireland) Grosvenor Park, Belfast	20,000
29 April 1920	(England) Dick, Kerr Ladies (Note: Dick, Kerr Ladies was credited as England in this match, which the Football Association described in 2009 as the first women's international match.)	2–0	France XI	Charity friendly	(United Kingdom) Deepdale, Preston	25,000
27 December 1920	(England) Dick, Kerr Ladies (Note: Goodison Park is closer to St Helens (and may have been considered their main ground) but contemporaneous sources list Dick, Kerr Ladies first in the match report and score, and the match is most associated with Dick, Kerr Ladies.)	4–0	(England) St Helens	Charity friendly	(United Kingdom) Goodison Park, Liverpool	53,000
25 December 1970	(Catalonia) Barcelona	0–0 (4–3 p)	(Catalonia) Centelles	Exhibition cup/charity friendly	(Spain) Camp Nou, Barcelona	60,000
15 August 1971	Mexico	3–1	Argentina	Mundial group stage	Estadio Azteca, Mexico City	90,000
22 August 1971	Mexico	4–0	England	Mundial group stage	Estadio Azteca, Mexico City	90,000
5 September 1971	Mexico	0–3	Denmark	Mundial final	Estadio Azteca, Mexico City	110,000
16 November 1991	China	4–0	Norway	World Cup group stage	(China) Tianhe Stadium, Guangzhou	65,000
1 August 1996	China	1–2	United States	Olympic final	(United States) Sanford Stadium, Athens, Georgia	76,489
19 June 1999	United States	3–0	Denmark	World Cup group stage	(United States) Giants Stadium, East Rutherford	78,972
10 July 1999	United States	0–0 (5–4 p)	China	World Cup final	(United States) Rose Bowl, Los Angeles	90,185
30 March 2022	(Spain) Barcelona	5–2	(Spain) Real Madrid	Champions League quarter-final	(Spain) Camp Nou, Barcelona	91,553
22 April 2022	(Spain) Barcelona	5–1	(Germany) Wolfsburg	Champions League semi-final	(Spain) Camp Nou, Barcelona	91,648

== See also ==
- Dick, Kerr Ladies 4–0 St Helens Ladies
- Selecció Barcelona 0–0 UE Centelles
- 1971 Women's World Cup
- 1999 FIFA Women's World Cup final
- National Women's Soccer League attendance
- Alexia: Labor Omnia Vincit
