= Light tower (equipment) =

A light tower is a piece of mobile equipment which has one or more high-intensity electric lamps and a mast. Almost always, the lights are attached to the mast, which is attached to a trailer, with a generator set to power the lamps. Normally the lamps are metal halide bulbs and the generator is powered by a diesel engine. However, battery-powered, solar-powered and hydrogen-powered sets are available; light towers with electrodeless lamps lighting are also sold. Modular kits permit separation of the generator set, trailer, lights and mast from each other. Another variation is an inflatable mast. Particularly when an inflatable mast is used, the lights may be placed close to the ground, with a reflector attached to the mast. When soft lighting is wanted, an inflatable "balloon" diffuser may be used. An inflatable mast may serve as a diffuser.

Light towers are used when illumination is required but not otherwise available, both outdoor and indoor, usually temporarily. Example activities are construction, mining, motion picture production, demolition, emergency services, sport or agricultural sectors.

== Image gallery ==
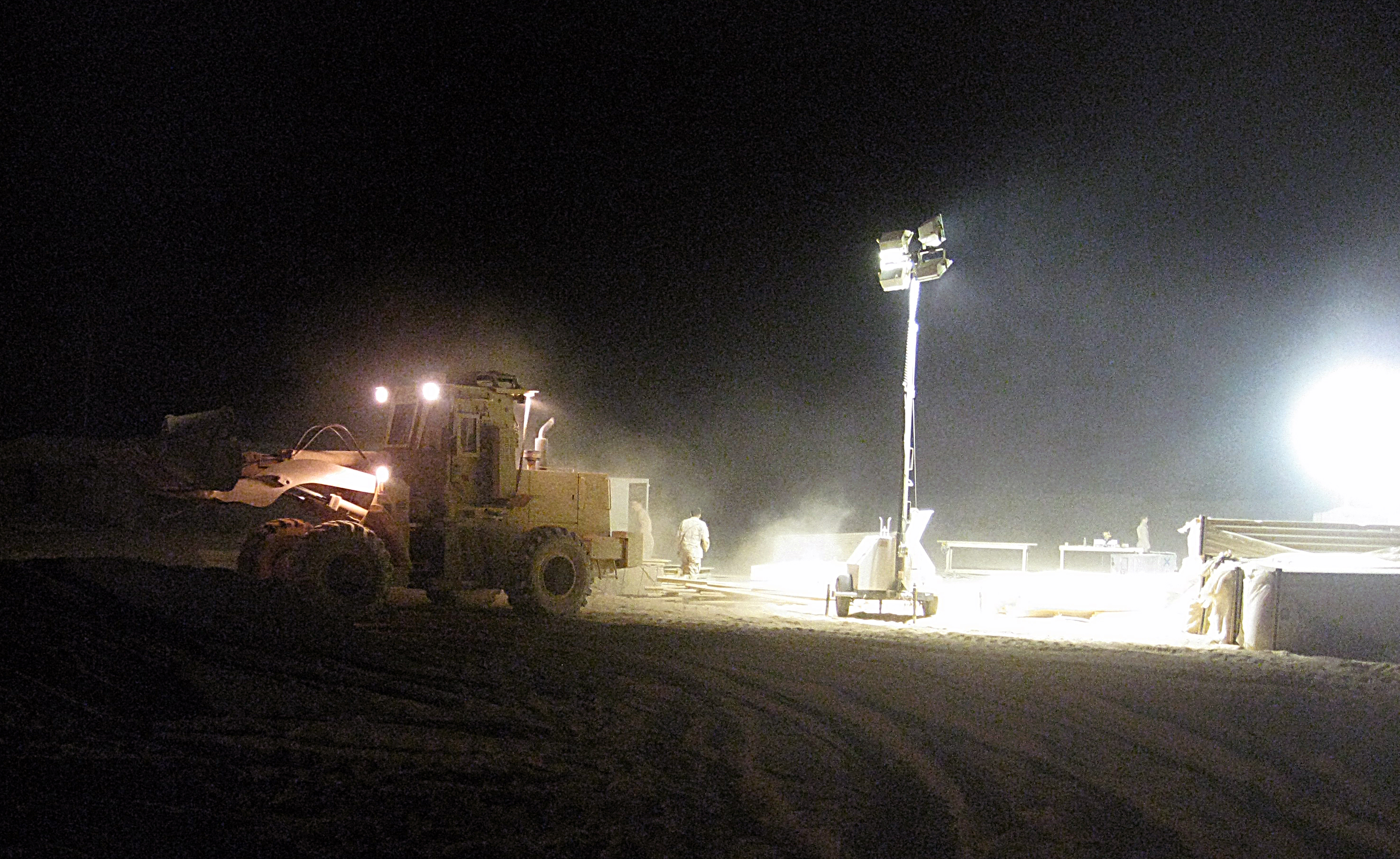
construction of military base

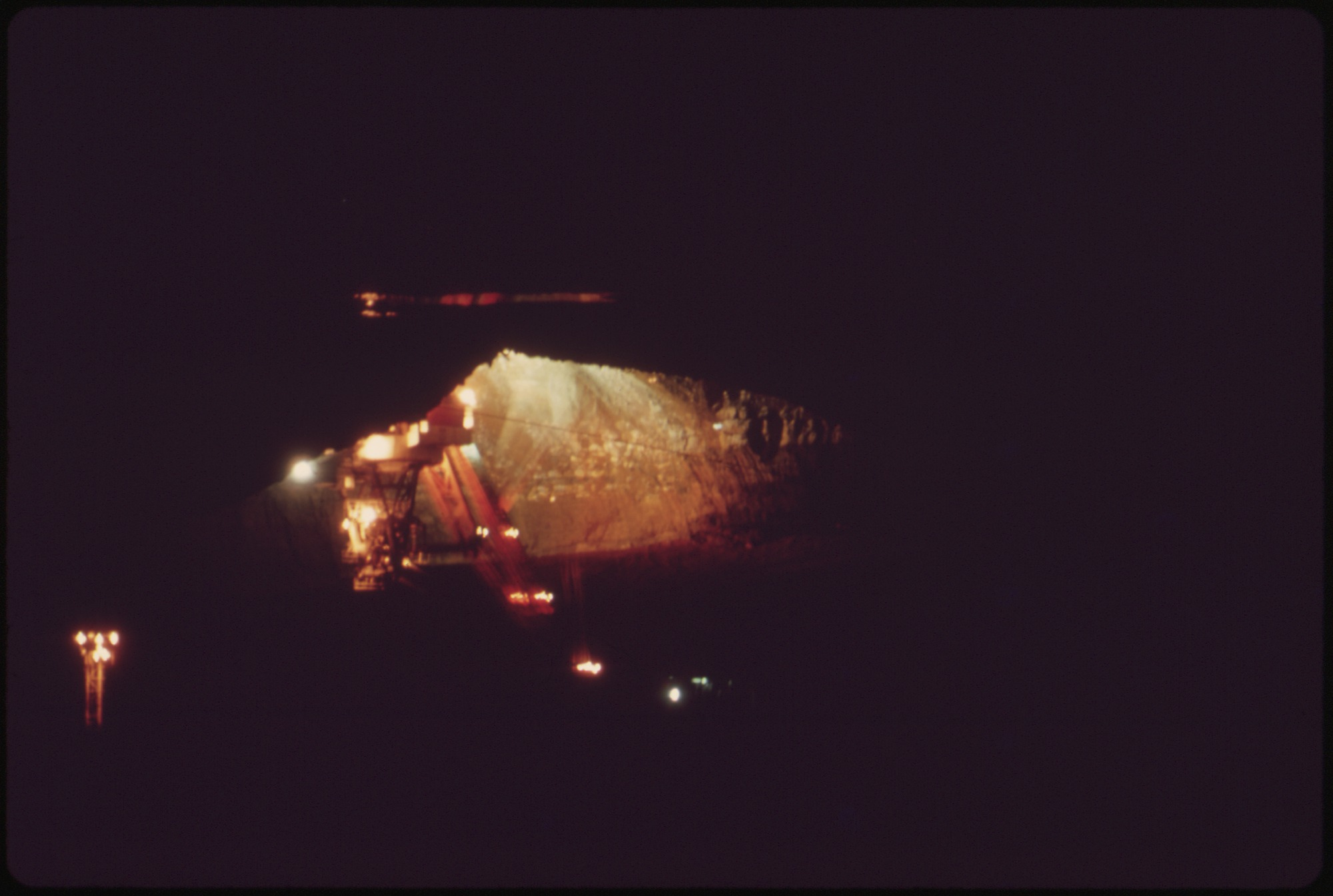
light tower (far left) at open-pit coal mine

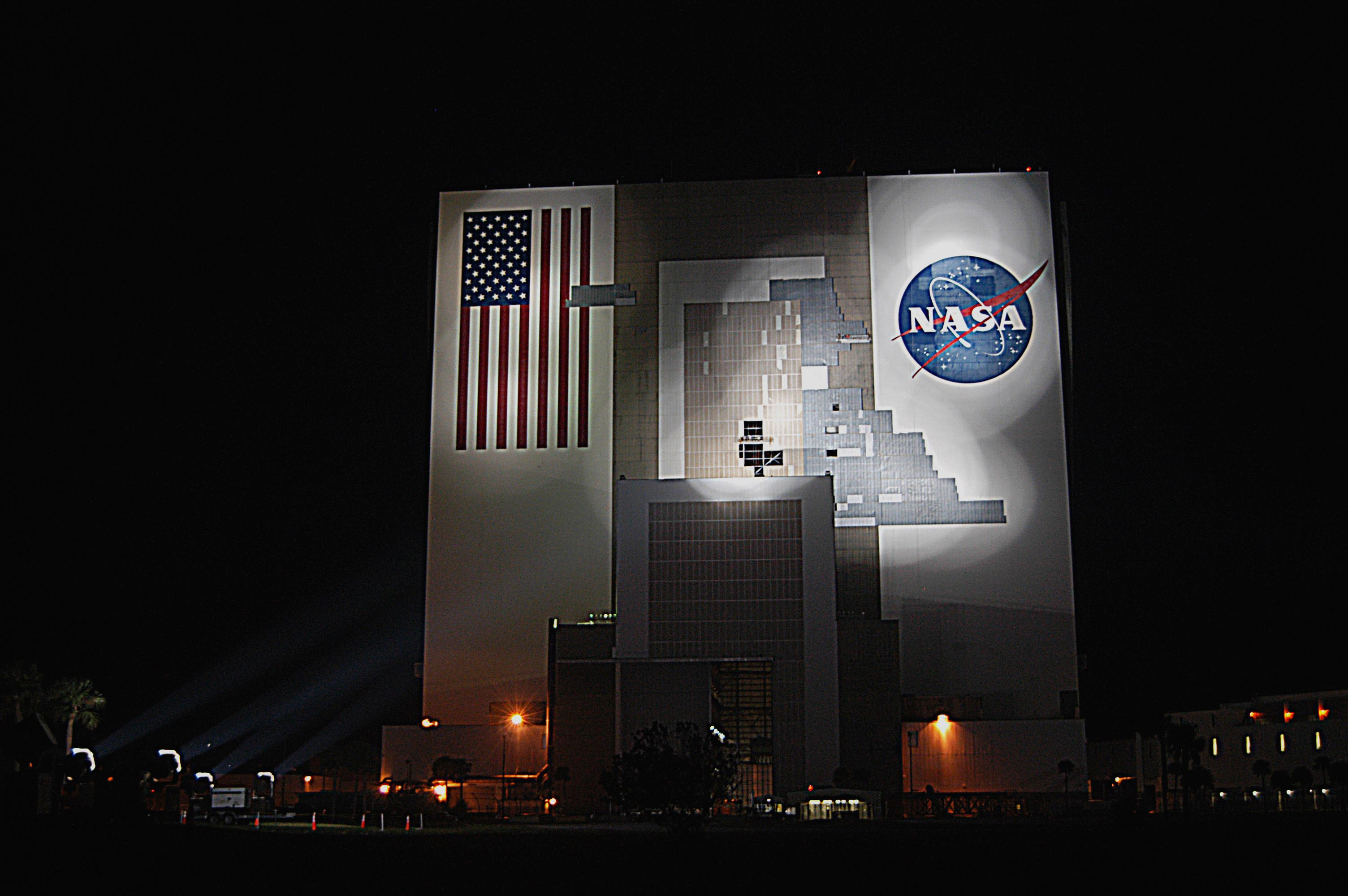
repairs to building

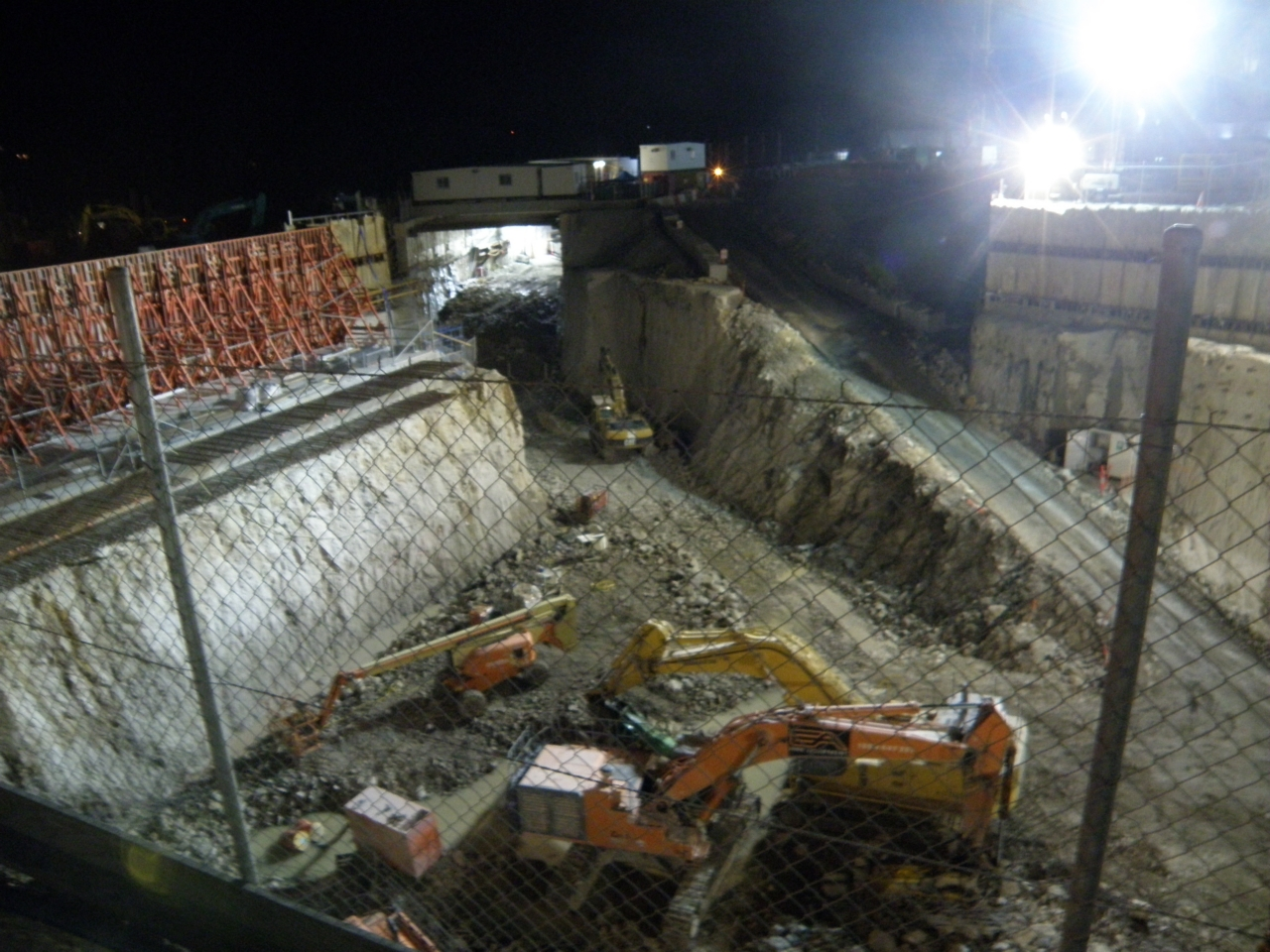
construction of highway tunnel

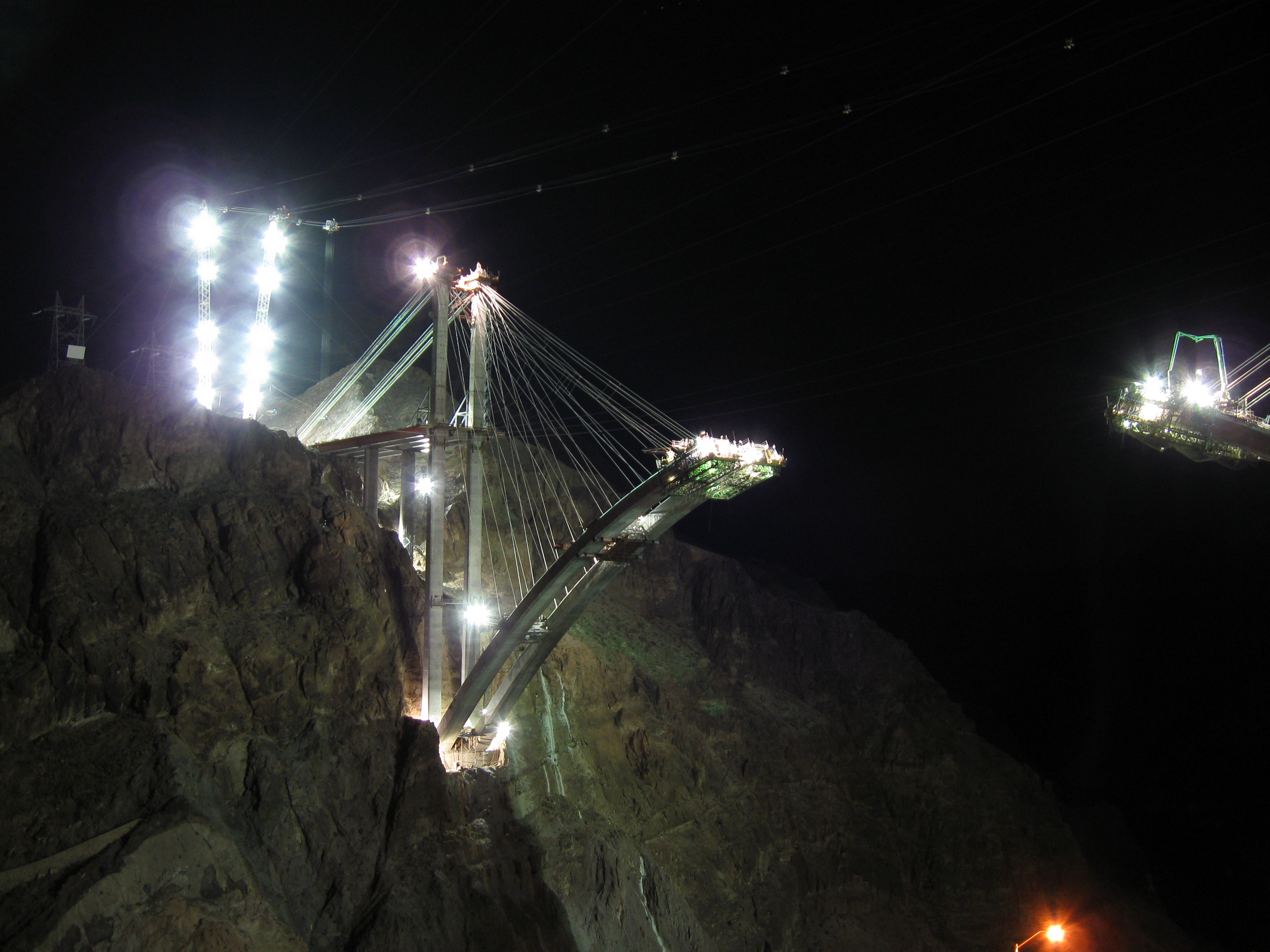
light towers (upper left) used in construction of bridge

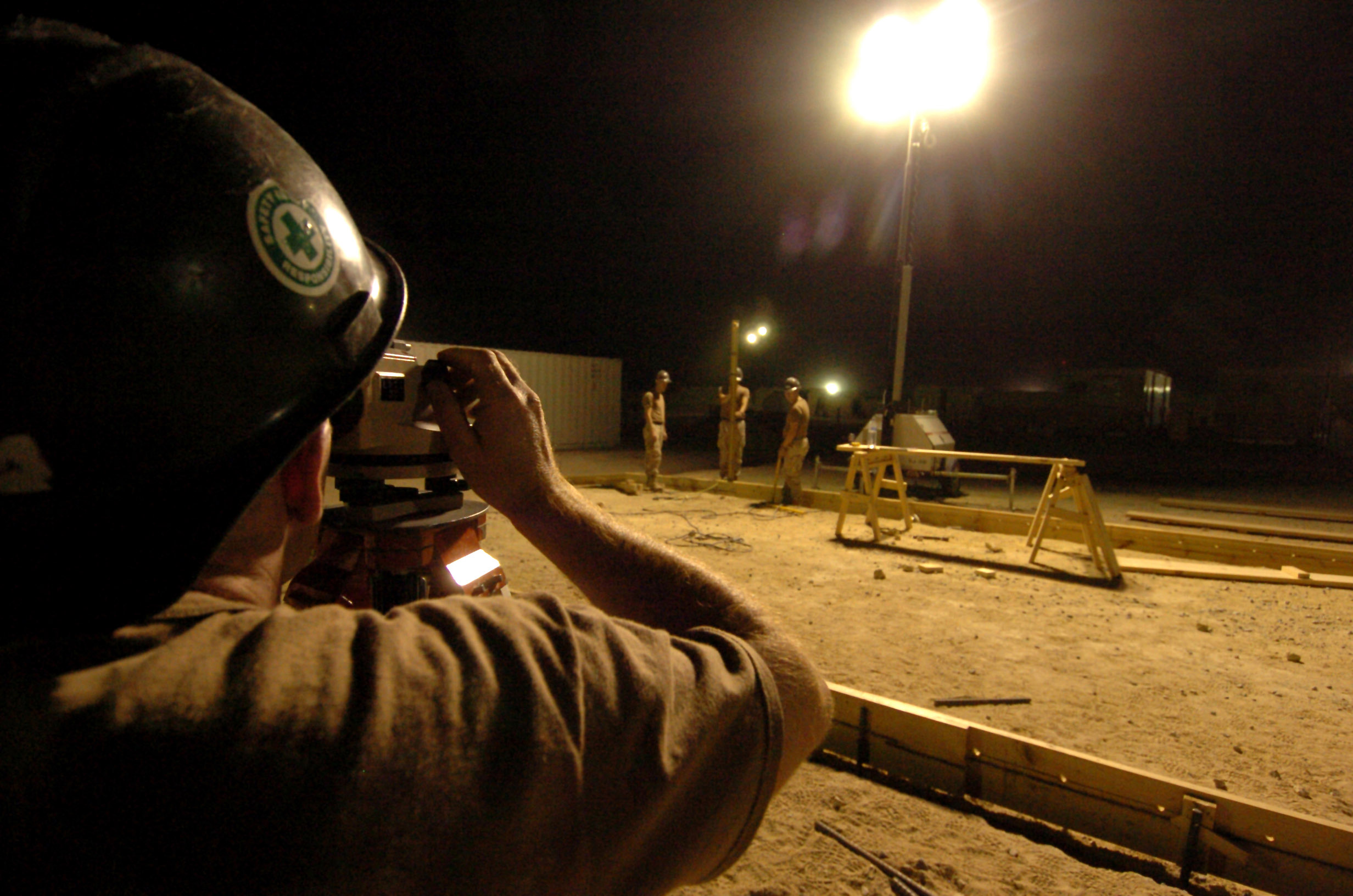
construction of military base

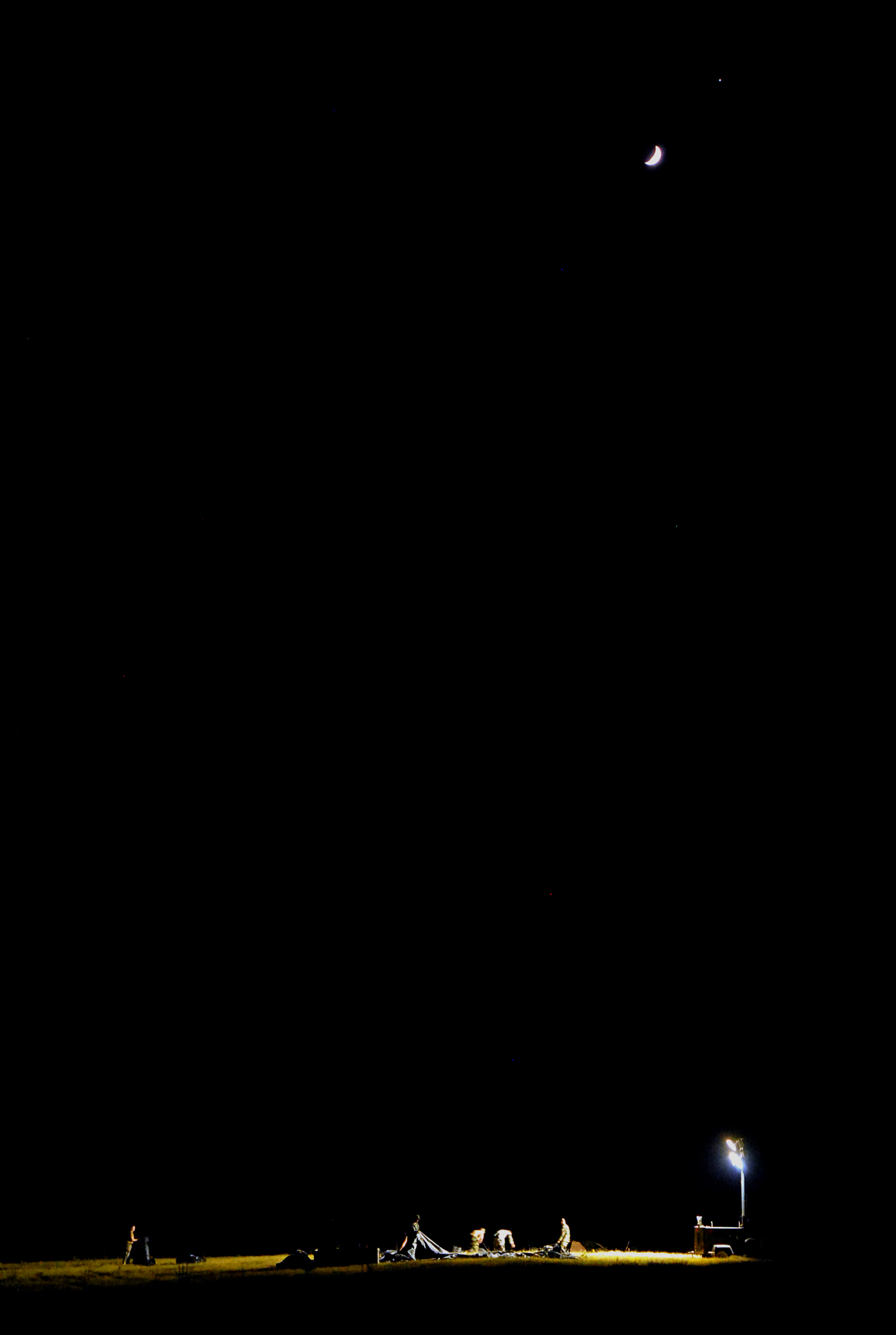
military training for construction

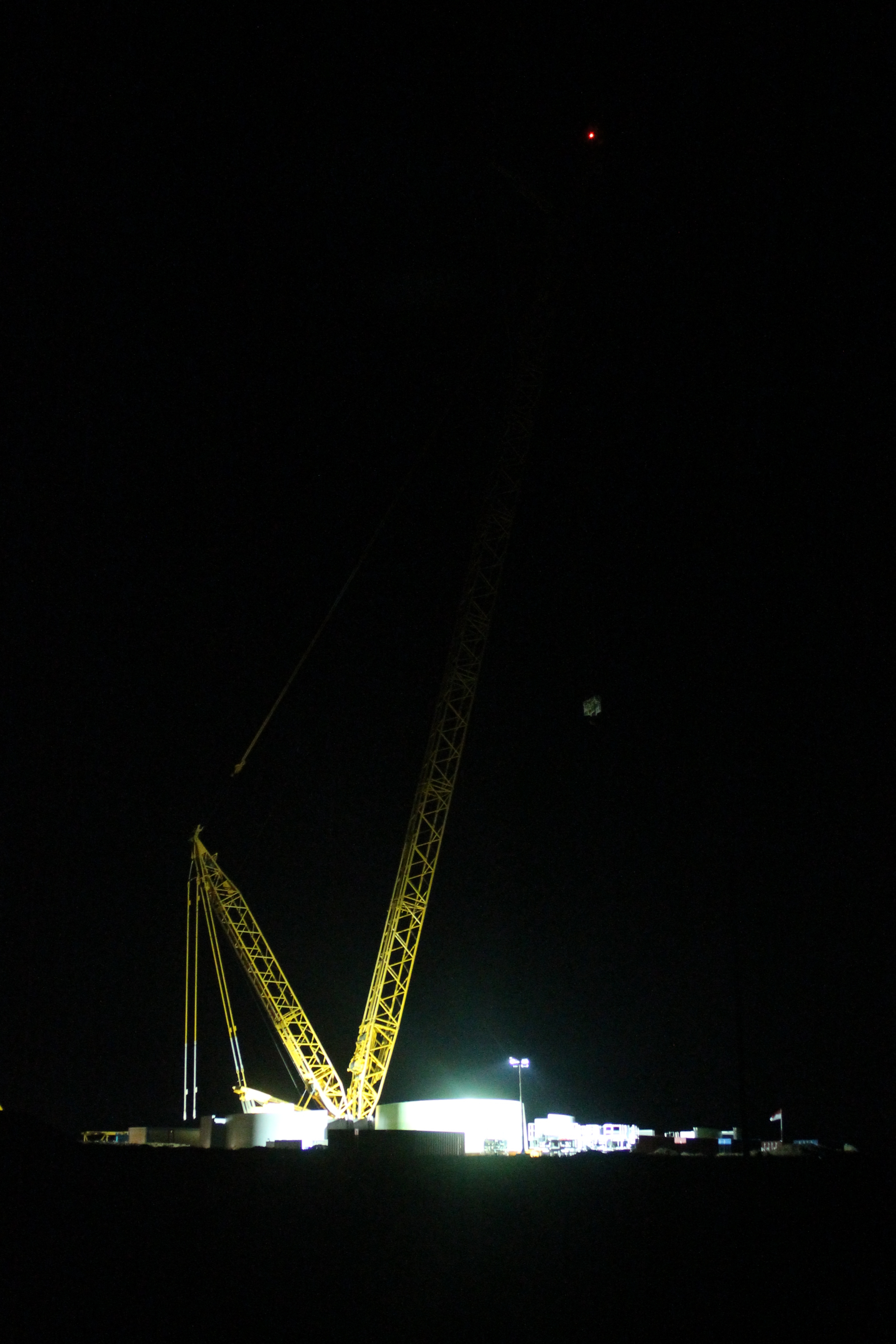
construction of wind turbine

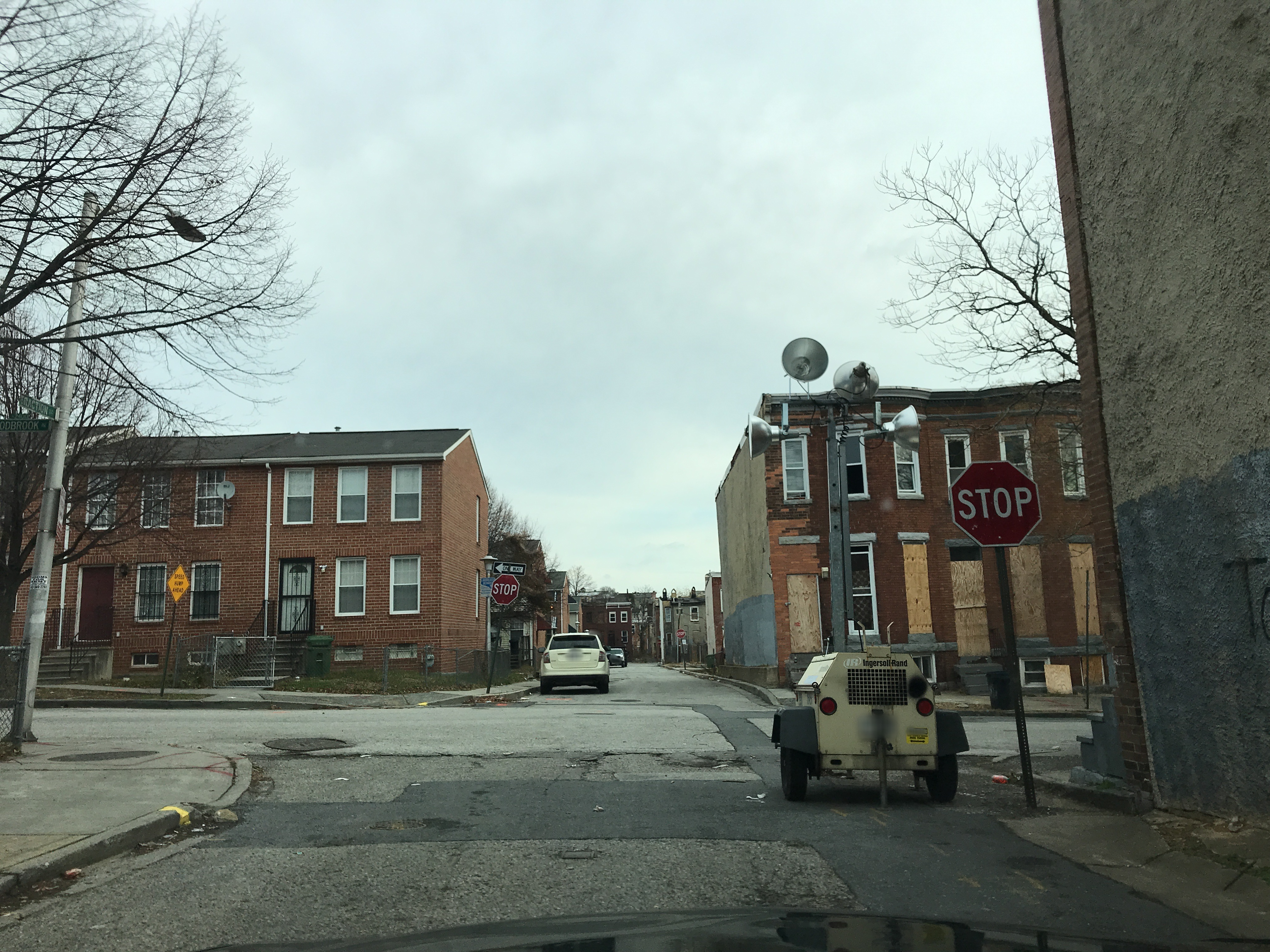
light tower placed at street intersection by Baltimore Police Department

== See also ==
- High-mast lighting
- Moonlight tower
