= List of FC Barcelona Femení players =

Futbol Club Barcelona Femení is a professional association football club based in Barcelona, Catalonia, Spain. The club was officially founded in 1970 by Immaculada Cabecerán, with the support of FC Barcelona. At least 286 women have played for the club; information on players from before professionalism may be incomplete due to lack of good record-keeping.

This list includes legendary players and those with 100 or more appearances. FC Barcelona keeps a record of players, all former and predominantly retired, whom they consider legendary in an online Hall of Fame. These players were typically captains at important milestones, record holders, and others with significant individual impact.

== Players ==
Sources: Soccerway.com, resultados-futbol.com, Agrupació Jugadors FCB, Bdfutbol.com

As of March 2026

Current players are in bold

Name	Nationality	Position	Barcelona career	Appearances	Goals	Notes
Immaculada Cabecerán	Spain	Forward	1970–1971	27	1	Founder
Núria Llansà	Spain	Goalkeeper	1970–1974	18+	0	Original team player and executive for over two decades
Lolita Ortiz	Spain	Forward	1970–1981	?	26+	Original team player and captain for over a decade
Vicenta Pubill	Spain	Forward	1970–1983	?	?	Original team player
Kety Pulido	Spain	Defender	1984–1994	?	?	Longstanding captain, winner of Barcelona's first two official cups
Ani Escribano	Spain	Defender	1999–2013	208	14	Longstanding captain, 8 titles with Barcelona
Melanie Serrano	Spain	Defender	2003–2022	517	32	Record for most Barcelona appearances, 28 titles with Barcelona
Maribel Domínguez	Mexico	Forward	2005–2006	31	15	Top goalscorer and icon during a difficult period for the team
Vicky Losada	Spain	Midfielder	2006–2007; 2008–2014; 2014–2015; 2016–2021	376	61+	Longstanding captain, 24 titles with Barcelona
Esther Romero Ruiz	Spain	Midfielder	2006–2011; 2013–2016	122	3	
Marta Unzué	Spain	Defender	2006–2018	348	21	
Elba Unzué Urdániz	Spain	Forward	2006–2011	112	12	
Laura Ràfols	Spain	Goalkeeper	2007–2018	216	0	Goalkeeper during Barcelona's first golden era, 17 titles with Barcelona
Laura Gómez Gutíerrez	Spain	Defender	2008–2014	195	3	
Carol Férez	Spain	Forward	2009–2014	124	23+	
Marta Corredera	Spain	Defender	2010–2015	185	41+	
Olga García	Spain	Forward	2010–2013; 2015–2018	207	75+	Prolific goalscorer during Barcelona's first golden era, 12 titles with Barcelona
Sonia Bermúdez	Spain	Forward	2011–2014; 2014–2015	141	107+	Extremely prolific goalscorer during Barcelona's first golden era
Míriam Diéguez	Spain	Defender	2011–2017	187	23+	
Leila Ouahabi	Spain	Defender	2011–2013; 2016–2022	200	6	
Alexia Putellas	Spain	Midfielder	2012–2026	496	226	
Gemma Gili	Spain	Defender	2012–2019	195	11+	
Virginia Torrecilla	Spain	Midfielder	2012–2015	113	7+	
Ruth García	Spain	Defender	2013–2018	171	8+	
Jenni Hermoso	Spain	Forward	2013–2017; 2019–2022	224	181+	Barcelona's record goalscorer at time of departure, role model in international football, 17 titles with Barcelona
**Marta Torrejón**	Spain	Defender	2013–present	461	70+	
Mariona Caldentey	Spain	Forward	2014–2024	303	105	
Bárbara Latorre	Spain	Forward	2015–2019	118	28+	
**Patricia Guijarro**	Spain	Midfielder	2015–present	348	71	
Sandra Paños	Spain	Goalkeeper	2015–2024	280	0	
**Aitana Bonmatí**	Spain	Midfielder	2016–present	311	110	
Ona Batlle	Spain	Defender	2016–2017; 2023–2026	111	13	
Lieke Martens	Netherlands	Forward	2017–2022	156	73	
Mapi León	Spain	Defender	2017–2026	276	17+	
**Clàudia Pina**	Spain	Forward	2017–present	173	77	
Andrea Pereira	Spain	Defender	2018–2022	132	0	
Asisat Oshoala	Nigeria	Forward	2019–2024	163	117	
Ana-Maria Crnogorčević	Switzerland	Defender	2019–2023	117	21	
**Caroline Graham Hansen**	Norway	Forward	2019–present	192	93	
**Irene Paredes**	Spain	Defender	2021–present	144	14	
Ingrid Syrstad Engen	Norway	Midfielder	2021–2025	150	7	
Fridolina Rolfö	Sweden	Forward	2021–2025	129	38	
Keira Walsh	England	Midfielder	2022–2025	100	6	
**Vicky López**	Spain	Midfielder	2022–present	119	31	
**Salma Paralluelo**	Spain	Forward	2022–present	119	69	
**Esmee Brugts**	Netherlands	Forward	2023–present	114	24	
