= List of FC Barcelona Femení players (1–99 appearances) =

Appearances and goals are for first-team competitive matches only.

== Current players with 1–99 appearances ==
By first team debut. Players in plain font are currently on loan away from the club.

Name	Nationality	Position	Barcelona career	Appearances	Goals	Notes
Cata Coll	Spain	Goalkeeper	2019–present	96	0	
Ewa Pajor	Poland	Forward	2024–present	82	73	
Kika Nazareth	Portugal	Midfielder	2024–present	63	18	
Sydney Schertenleib	Switzerland	Midfielder	2024–present	61	8	
Gemma Font	Spain	Goalkeeper	2020–present	49	0	
Clara Serrajordi	Spain	Midfielder	2025–present	40	2	
Aïcha Camara	Spain	Defender	2025–present	36	1	
Laia Aleixandri	Spain	Defender	2025–present	21	3	
Carla Julià	Spain	Defender	2025–present	18	3	
Martine Fenger	Norway	Forward	2025–present	11	0	
Adriana Ranera	Spain	Defender	2025–present	6	0	
Ainoa Gómez	Spain	Forward	2025–present	3	1	
Celia Segura	Spain	Forward	2024–present	2	0	
Maria Llorella	Spain	Defender	2025–present	2	0	
Rosalía Dominguez	Spain	Midfielder	2025–present	2	0	
Martina González	Spain	Defender	2025–present	1	0	
Emilia Szymczak	Poland	Midfielder	2025–present	1	0	
Laia Martret	Spain	Forward	2025–present	1	0	
Natàlia Escot	Spain	Forward	2024–present	1	0	
Lúa Arufe	Spain	Forward	2025–present	1	0	
Txell Font	Spain	Goalkeeper	2025–present	?	0	

== Former players with 1–99 appearances ==
By most appearances

Name	Nationality	Position	Barcelona career	Appearances		League goals	Notes
Name	Nationality	Position	Barcelona career	Total	League	League goals	Notes
Kheira Hamraoui	France	Midfielder	2018–2021	97	66	6	
Jana Fernández	Spain	Defender	2018–2025	95	46	4	
Andressa Alves	Brazil	Forward	2016–2019	92			
Paulina Ferré Serres	Spain	Midfielder	2005–2009	87			
Melisa Nicolau	Spain	Defender	2010–2013	86			
Toni Duggan	England	Forward	2017–2019	72	51	20	
Bruna Vilamala	Spain	Forward	2020–2024	71	50	20	
Lucy Bronze	England	Defender	2022–2024	70	41	4	
Kenti Robles	Mexico	Defender	2011–2014	65			
Silvia Doblado Peña	Spain	Midfielder	2008–2010	63			
Marta Liria López "Lilo"	Spain	Forward	2008–2011	63			
Alicia Fuentes Molina	Spain	Midfielder	2008–2010	62			
Nataša Andonova	North Macedonia	Forward	2017–2019	60	43	7	
Laura Gutiérrez Navarro	Spain	Midfielder	2010–2013	60			
Mari Paz Vilas	Spain	Forward	2008–2011	58			
Rocío Ángela López Díaz	Spain	Defender	2009–2011	57			
Montserrat Tomé	Spain	Midfielder	2010–2012	54			
Clara Villanueva Izquierdo	Spain	Defender	2007–2010	49			
Noemí Rubio	Spain	Midfielder	2009–2011	48			
Elixabete Sarasola Nieto	Spain	Goalkeeper	2009–2012	48			
Ana Romero	Spain	Midfielder	2013–2015	48			
Ane Bergara	Spain	Defender	2015–2017	45			
Candela Andújar	Spain	Forward	2017–2020	44	34	2	
Irene del Río	Spain	Midfielder	2015–2017	41			
Andrea Falcón	Spain	Forward	2013–2016; 2019–2022	40			
Sandra Hernández	Spain	Midfielder	2014–2017	38			
Leire Landa	Spain	Defender	2014–2017	37			
Laia Codina	Spain	Defender	2019–2023	36	29	2	
Geyse	Brazil	Forward	2022–2023	36	24	6	
Élise Bussaglia	France	Midfielder	2017–2018	35	23	3	
Line Røddik Hansen	Denmark	Defender	2016–2018	35			
Mireia Chico González	Spain	Defender	2005–2007	34			
Marta Cubí	Spain	Forward	2009–2010	31			
Martina Fernández	Spain	Defender	2022–2024	29	21	1	
Saray Lucha Hurtado	Spain	Defender	2005–2008	26			
Alba Aznar Martí	Spain	Midfielder	2011–2013	26			
Núria Garrote	Spain	Defender	2013–2016	26			
Cristina Baudet	Spain	Midfielder	2014–2016	26			
Goretti Donaire	Spain	Midfielder	1999–2001; 2005–2006	25	22	5	
Patricia Pérez Peña "Patty"	Mexico	Midfielder	2005–2006	25			
Jelena Čanković	Serbia	Forward	2013–2014	24			
Nuria Rábano	Spain	Defender	2022–2023	24	18	0	
Ange N'Guessan	Ivory Coast	Forward	2016–2017	22			
Stefanie van der Gragt	Netherlands	Defender	2018–2020	21	14	2	
Raquel Cabezón	Spain	Midfielder	2005–2006	20			
Jesica Todó Carceller	Spain	Forward	2006–2009	20			
Aída Garcia Garcia	Spain	Forward	2007–2009	19	14	1	
Cristina Vega Bobo		Forward	2006–2007	18			
Silvia Monje Hidalgo	Spain	Midfielder	2005–2006	16			
Anna Márquez García	Spain	Defender	2009–2011	16			
María Pérez	Spain	Midfielder	2020–2023	15	10	0	
Ludmila Manicler	Argentina	Forward	2011–2012	14			
Chelsea Ashurst	England	Goalkeeper	2013–2015	14			
Ona Baradad	Spain	Forward	2021–2025	14	7	1	
Fabiana	Brazil	Defender	2017–2018	13	9	1	
Laura Carriba Besteiro	Spain	Forward	2007–2009	13			
Patricia Martínez Augusto	Spain	Forward	2008–2009	13			
Florencia Quiñones	Argentina	Midfielder	2011–2013	13			
Esther Sullastres	Spain	Goalkeeper	2012–2013	12	10	0	
Lucía Corrales	Spain	Forward	2022–2024	12	10	0	
Alba Caño	Spain	Midfielder	2022–2026	11	3	1	
Emma Ramírez	Spain	Defender	2020–2023	10	9	0	
Pamela Tajonar	Mexico	Goalkeeper	2018–2020	10	5	0	
Anna Riera Ruiz		Forward	2009–2010	10			
Zaíra Flores Nogueras	Spain	Midfielder	2010–2011; 2012–2013	9			
Anair Lomba Álvarez "Lombi"	Spain	Forward	2006–2007	7			
Perle Morroni	France	Defender	2017–2018	5	4	0	
Júlia Bartel	Spain	Midfielder	2020–2024	5	4	0	
Ari Arias	Spain	Forward	2022–2024	5	3	1	
Silvia Vila Fernández	Spain	Forward	2006–2009	4			
Pilar Garrote	Spain	Midfielder	2013–2015	4			
María Molina Molero	Spain	Defender	2020–2022	3	2		
Ornella Vignola	Uruguay	Forward	2020–2022	3	2		
Carla Armengol	Spain	Forward	2018–2020	3	1	0	
Judit Pujols	Spain	Defender	2023–2025	3	0	0	
Cynthia Pidal Rodríguez	Spain	Defender	2006–2007	3			
Marta Yáñez Pendas	Spain	Forward	2006–2009	3			
Ariadna Mingueza	Spain	Midfielder	2020–2023	2	2	0	
Ellie Roebuck	England	Goalkeeper	2024–2025	2	2	0	
Andrea Giménez Gracia	Spain	Goalkeeper	2016–2018	2	0	0	
Anna Torrodà	Spain	Defender	2017–2018	2	0	0	
Aida Esteve Quintero	Spain	Midfielder	2018–2019	2	0		
Esther Laborde Cabanillas	Spain	Defender	2022–2023	1	1	0	
Grau(?)		Defender	2013–2014	1			
Nerea Valeriano Martínez	Spain	Midfielder	2014–2015	1	0	0	
Paula Gutiérrez Caballero	Spain	Midfielder	2018–2019	1	0	0	
Giovana Queiroz	Brazil	Forward	2020–2021	1	0	0	

== Unknown appearances ==
Name	Nationality	Position	Barcelona career	Appearances		League goals	Notes
Name	Nationality	Position	Barcelona career	Total	League	League goals	Notes
Maria Antònia Mínguez	Spain	Goalkeeper	1970–1974	2+	2+	0	
Consuelo Pérez Cuenca	Spain	Forward	1970–1972		<26	<15	
Josefa "Fina" Ros Verdugo	Spain	?	1970–1980				also coach
Glòria Comas Tarrés	Spain	Midfielder	1970–1972		<26	<15	
Carme Nieto	Spain	Midfielder	1970–1971		<26	<15	
Núria Gómez Amat	Spain	Forward	1971–1975				
Mercedes Martínez Moya	Spain	?	1971–1974				
Pilar Gazulla	Spain	Defender	1970–1976				
Alícia Estivill Ropero	Spain	Forward	1970–1975				
Maria Lluisa Vilaseca Blasi	Spain	Midfielder	1970–1974				
Anna Jaques Vidal	Spain	Defender	1970–1973				
Anna Maria Trullàs Moreno	Spain	Defender	1970–1973				
Maria Teresa Andreu	Spain	Goalkeeper	1971–1982	1+	1+	0	
Juani Escamilla	Spain		1980s–?				
Patri Martínez	Spain		1980s–?				
"Negrita"	Spain		1980s–?				
"Lobito"	Spain		1980s–?				
Mari González	Spain		1980s–?				
Tere	Spain		1980s–?				
Ani Castaño	Spain		1980s–?				
Loli Rodríguez Giménez		Defender	1980–1983				
Marta Mestres Pradell	Spain	Forward	1982–1987				
Maria Angeles Navas Garcia			1983–1985; 1985–?				
Pilar Moreno			1983–1994				
Montse Bonachera			1980's–1985; 1985–?				
Montse Guimerà		Goalkeeper	?–1985; 1985–?				
Joana Bernabéu			?–1985; 1985–?				
Conchi Capilla			?–1985; 1985–?				
M. Vandellòs			?–1985; 1985–?				
Lucía Herrero			?–1985; 1985–?				
Inmaculada Romero			?–1985; 1985–?				
Núria Rabanal "Quini"			?–1985; 1985–?				
Lucia Ruiz Dominguez			1984–1986				
Emilia Ibáñez		Forward	1979–1987				
Adelina Pastor Martínez	Spain	Defender	1986–1993, 2002–2004				
Sílvia Gelabert Udina	Spain	Midfielder	1988–1998				
Àfrica Ocaña Fernández	Spain	Defender	1988–1999				
Guadalupe Villar			1989–1990?				
Montse Vidal			1989–1990?				
Gemma Homar Colom	Spain	Defender	1989–1990?				
Montse Sánchez			1989–1990?				
Esther			1989–1990?				
Ariana			1989–1990?				
Sagrario Serrano Campos		Midfielder	1989–1991; ?–1994				
Olga Huertas			1989–1991; ?–1994				
Laura Tarín Fernández		Defender	maybe 1990–1994				
Maite Datzira			maybe 1990–1994				
Laia Fusté			?–1990; 1991–?				
Dolors Casacuberta			?–1990; 1991–?				
Ibón			?–1990; 1991–?				
Soledad García Perez			?–1990; 1991–?				
Inés de Carreras			?–1990; 1991–?				
Anna Codina			?–1990; 1991–?				
Carolina Juliench Martínez	Spain	Midfielder	1990–2003				
Elisabet Cólera Sarrias	Spain		1992–1996				
Maria Amo Tutusaus	Spain	?	1992–1998				
Toñi Muñoz Diaz		Forward	1993				
Maria Roser Serra Carandell	Spain	Goalkeeper	?–1993; 1994–?; 1996–1998; 1998–?				
Ana García "Ani"			?–1993; 1994–?				
Maria Àngels Grau			?–1993; 1994–?				
Anna Solernou			?–1993; 1994–?				
Marina Millán	Spain	Defender	?–1993; 1994–?				
Ariadna Vinyoles			?–1993; 1994–?				
Maria Carmen Arias			?–1993; 1994–?				
Maite Datzira Villanueva			?–1993; 1994–?				
Montserrat Sánchez			?–1993; 1994–?				
Olga Moreno			?–1993; 1994–?				
Esther Inglés			?–1993; 1994–?				
Silvia Díaz González	Spain	?	1990–2003				
Esther Torrecilla López	Spain	Forward	1993–2002	1+			
Irene González Milla	Spain	?	1993–2000	?			
Judith Corominas		Defender	?–1993; 1994–?; ?–1997				
Lorena Hernandez González	Spain	Midfielder	1994–2002				
Maria Isabel Martin Carreira	Spain	Forward	1992–1996				
Mònica González			?–1995; 1996–?				
Anabel Junyent Iglesias	Spain	Midfielder	1995–2003				
Beatriz García Bernardo	Spain		1997–1998				
Marina Torras Floriach	Spain	Defender	1997–1998, 2008–10	36+	34+	4+	
María Isabel Quiles Quesada	Spain	Forward	1997–2004				
Cristina Pacheco Martínez	Spain	?	1996–2003				
Olga Moreno Peral	Spain	Defender	1994–2001				
Esther Casals Flores	Spain	Midfielder	2000–2001, 2007–2008				
Marta Melgosa Nocete	Spain	Midfielder	1999–2004				
Laia Ramón Iñiguez	Spain	Forward	2000–2007				
Gemma Giró Pamies	Spain	Midfielder	1999–2000				
Irene Hervás	Spain	Goalkeeper	?–2001				
Maria José Camacho Caballero	Spain	Forward	2000–2001				
Sheila Sanchón Huerta	Spain	Defender	2000–2009				
Susana Galiana Pulido	Spain	Defender	2000–2002				
Marina Marimon Robert	Spain	Goalkeeper	2000–2007				
Berta Molina Homs	Spain	Goalkeeper	?–2001; 2002–?				
Gemma Pacheco Martínez	Spain	?	?–2001; 2002–?				
Silvia Mariano Franco	Spain	?	?				
Rosanna Miquel Pous	Spain	?	?				
Araceli Miquel Rosas	?	?	?				
Verónica Treviño Ramírez	Spain	?	?				
Cristina Jiménez Longueira	Spain	?	?				
Marina Colomé Benítez	Spain	?	?				
Flor De Luna Pila Rey	Spain	Midfielder	?				
Erica Fernández Rajo	Spain	?	?				
Alba Montserrat	Spain	Goalkeeper	1995–2003				
Desiree Moya Pedro	Spain	Midfielder	2001–2010				
Maria Visa Boladeras	Spain	Midfielder	2001–2010				
Margalida Mas Flaquer	Spain	Midfielder	2001–2005				
Natalia Arroyo	Spain	Defender	2001–2006				
Vanesa Solano			?–2001; 2002–?				
Estela Llavina			?–2001; 2002–?				
Débora Carmona			?–2001; 2002–?				
Jezabel Fernández			?–2001; 2002–?				
Belén Pérez			?–2001; 2002–?				
Neus Montserrat Tarín	Spain	?	?				
Adriana Martín	Spain	Forward	2002–2003; 2004–2005				
Alba Vilas Baiges	Spain	Midfielder	2002–2007				
Alba Mena Juárez	Spain	Midfielder	2002–2008				
Verónica Navarro Arquillo		Defender	2002–2006; 2007–2008				
María José Pons	Spain	Goalkeeper	2003–2005				
Zaida González Jiménez	Spain	Defender	2003–2005; 2007–2008				
Elia Giménez Porcell	Spain	Midfielder	2003–2005				
Ana Carralero Bonito	Spain	Midfielder	2003–2005				
Cristina Molina Durant	Spain	Goalkeeper	2003–2009				
Simona Vintilă	Romania	Forward	2003–2005				
Araceli José Benavente	Spain	Midfielder	2003–2004				
Carla Tomás González	Spain	Defender	2003–2006				
Gemma Quer Gener		Midfielder	2004–2006				
Ana Belén Fuertes Ledó "Kaky"	Spain	Defender	2004–2006				
Berta Carles Bové	Spain	Forward	2004–2007				
Larraitz Kortabarria Goñi	Spain	Midfielder	2004–2007				
Gemma Pinto Longas	Spain	Defender	2004–2007				
Judith Acedo Guerrero	Spain	Forward	2004–2007				
Ana María Lara Ruiz	Spain	Defender	2006–2007	?			
Sarai		Goalkeeper	2006–2007	?			
Cristina II		Defender	2006–2007	?			
Bea		Midfielder	2006–2007	?			
María		Midfielder	2006–2007	?			
Marina		Midfielder	2006–2007	?			
Laura		Midfielder	2006–2007	?			
Sandra Jiménez Morilla "Avión"	Spain	Forward	2007–2008; 2010–2012	18+			
Laura Bonaventura Brugués "Mixeta"	Spain	Defender	2008–2010	9+			
Gómez		Defender	2008–2009	?			
Montserrat Muñoz Chico		Defender	2008–2009	?			
Sandra		Midfielder	2009–2010	?			
Lidia		Midfielder	2009–2010	?			
Míriam de Francisco Rodríguez "Mimi"	Spain	Goalkeeper	2010–2011	?			
Villalba		Defender	2011–2012	?			
Carola García Garrido	Spain	Midfielder	2011–2012	?			
Berta Bou Salas	Spain	Defender	2020–2021	?			
