= Maria Antònia Mínguez =

Catalan footballer and nurse

Personal information
- Full name: Maria Antònia Mínguez Martín
- Date of birth: 5 March 1947 (age 79)
- Place of birth: Barcelona, Catalonia, Spain
- Position: Goalkeeper

Senior career*
| Years | Team | Apps | (Gls) |
| 1970–1974 | Barcelona | 2+ | |
- * Club domestic league appearances and goals

Maria Antònia Mínguez Martín (born 5 March 1947) is a Spanish former football goalkeeper. She played in FC Barcelona Femení's first-ever match, making her the team's first goalkeeper.

== Early and personal life ==
Mínguez grew up with a strict father. Though her brothers played football, she did not tell her father that she had joined a football team until the day before their first match. She then gave up football because of a boyfriend who was against her playing. From her retirement from football until her actual retirement she worked as a nurse.

== Career ==
Mínguez saw the advertisement published by Immaculada Cabecerán seeking players for a women's Barcelona football team, and decided to try out as a way of dealing with grief after her fiancé died on her birthday. Like all players, she tried out as a general outfield player, with coach and former goalkeeper Antoni Ramallets choosing her to be one of the goalkeepers. Mínguez had admired Ramallets and was satisfied with this. The goalkeepers trained with César Rodríguez, who was briefly the second coach, a former forward who drilled them until they stopped everything he shot at them. She started as the goalkeeper in the team's first match.

Mínguez stayed at the club for four and a half years, from 1970 to 1974, and during this period, she alternated with fellow goalkeeper Núria Llansà.
