= 1971–72 P.F. Barcelona season =

Peña Femenina Barcelona
1971 season
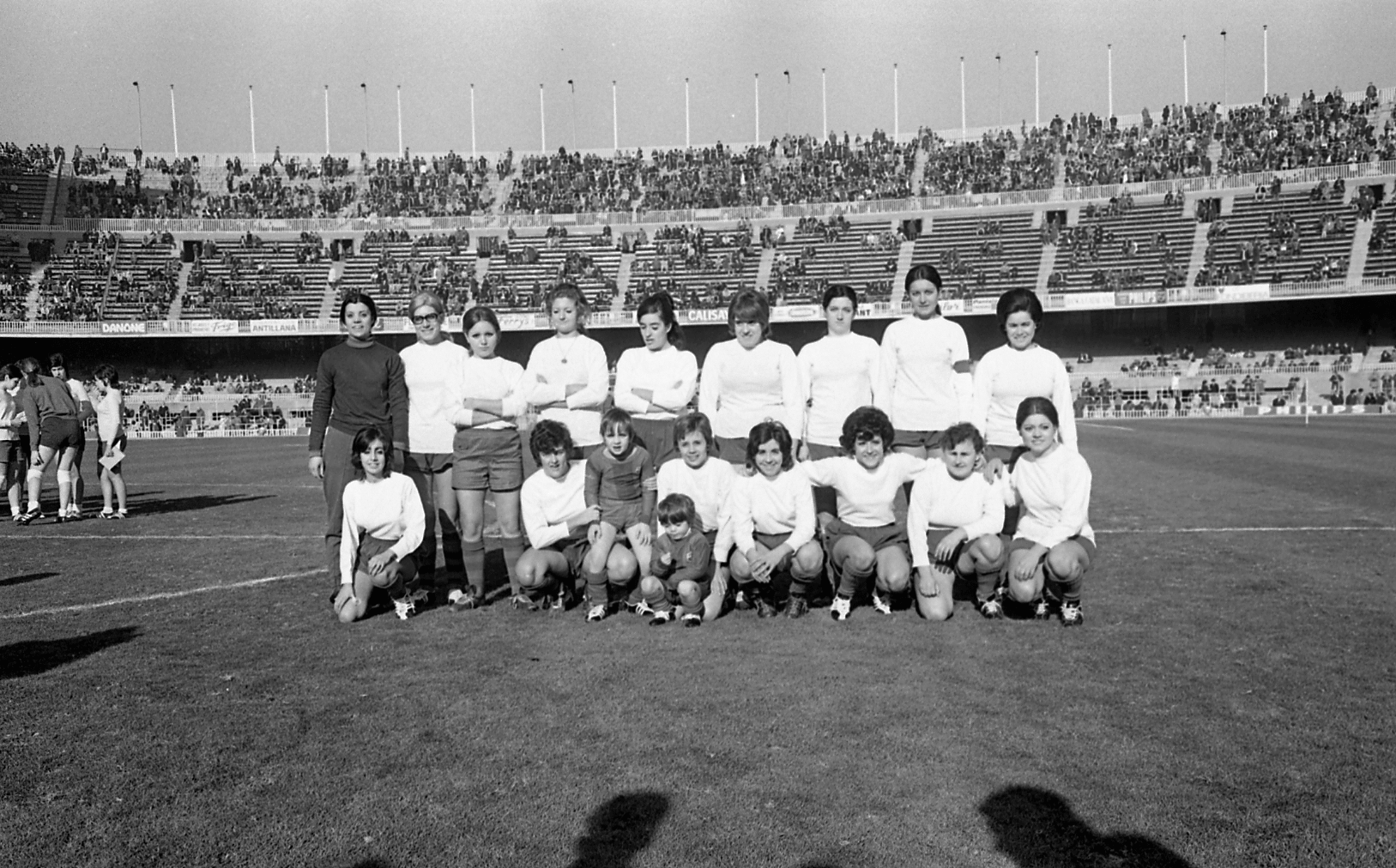
- The team on 25 December 1970
- Chairman: Agustí Montal Costa
- Manager: Antoni Ramallets
- Stadium: La Verneda; Camp Nou
- Campeonato de Cataluña: 4th
- Pernod Cup: Runner-up
- Top goalscorer: League: Lolita Ortiz (26); All: Lolita Ortiz
Home colours

The FC Barcelona women's team played its first organised games between 1970 and 1972. For the first match, a win by penalties on 25 December 1970, the team was known as Selecció Ciutat de Barcelona (or Spanish: Selección Ciudad de Barcelona). In February 1971, the team changed its name to Peña Femenina Barcelonista (or Catalan: Penya Femenina Barcelonista, Penya Femenina Barcelona). In a Spanish-language poster for the Pernod Cup in March 1971, the team was advertised as C. de F. Barcelona (Club de Fútbol Barcelona). In match reports from the league, they were called Barcelona.

They generally played home matches at La Verneda, the ground of CE Júpiter, with select matches played at the Camp Nou.

In the 1970 match, the team wore unaffiliated white shirts with Barcelona blaugrana socks. They wore blaugrana shirts in the Pernod Cup (Note: Based on a photograph of the captains from the final; Barcelona's captain is on the right in blaugrana, and Espanyol's captain is on the left (as can be seen in a photograph of only Espanyol, in the same kit, from the competition).) and the league. (Note: Per photos of their matches and having the nickname "azulgrana", see match reports.)

== Summary ==
=== Background ===
In the 1930s, women were banned from playing football in Spain by the Franco regime, a ban which would last until the regime ended in 1975. The Sección Femenina, a fascist pro-misogyny political advocacy group, was incorporated into the dictatorship during the regime, suppressing women's rights. The regime also suppressed lesbians, ironically encouraging the growth of women's football in Barcelona as a means of community-building, and sought to suppress a Catalan identity, including FC Barcelona. As the regime weakened in the late 1960s, women began returning to football, with the Sección Femenina actively spreading disinformation and officially banning the promotion of anything related to women's football to try and prevent this.

=== Founding ===
In 1971, the team gained its first logo.

In November 1970, 18-year-old Catalan amateur footballer Immaculada Cabecerán had aspirations for a more formal team; she had connections to FC Barcelona and met with then-president Agustí Montal Costa to discuss the formation of a women's team associated with the club. Montal gave his support. On 17 November 1970, similarly to how Joan Gamper had formed the men's team, Cabecerán posted a print advertisement in an FC Barcelona fan magazine called La Revista Barcelonista, seeking women between the ages of 18 and 25 to play in an exhibition match the following month at the Camp Nou. The advertisement that ran explained that Montal would only offer continuing support to a women's team if they "win all the matches." From the responses, the Selecció Ciutat de Barcelona or Selección Ciudad de Barcelona, comprising 16 players, was formed; they were coached by Barcelona legends Antoni Ramallets and César Rodríguez, although Rodríguez left after a few days. Cabecerán and her team were quickly popular, being described in early January 1971 as the most popular team.

The team gained its own logo in 1971, a design featuring the FC Barcelona crest overlaid with an oversized diamond/rhombus containing the same segments, and "P.F.B." in the central band. The diamond was inspired by the then-logo of FC Barcelona Atlètic, which was simply diamond-shaped. The 1971 logo was retained by the team until at least 1994 (when it was Club Femení Barcelona). In 2023, FC Barcelona added a diamond overlay to the club logo, as well as including diamonds in other kit designs, to honour the women's team.

=== League ===
Following the success of the Pernod Cup in March, the Catalan Association of Women's Football was founded at the end of April 1971. The same companies (Pernod as sponsor and Radio Reloj as promoter) that devised the Pernod Cup then founded a league among Catalan teams, with 26 matchdays in two splits, the Campeonato de Cataluña de Fútbol Femenino Copa Pernod, which began in May 1971 and concluded in March 1972.

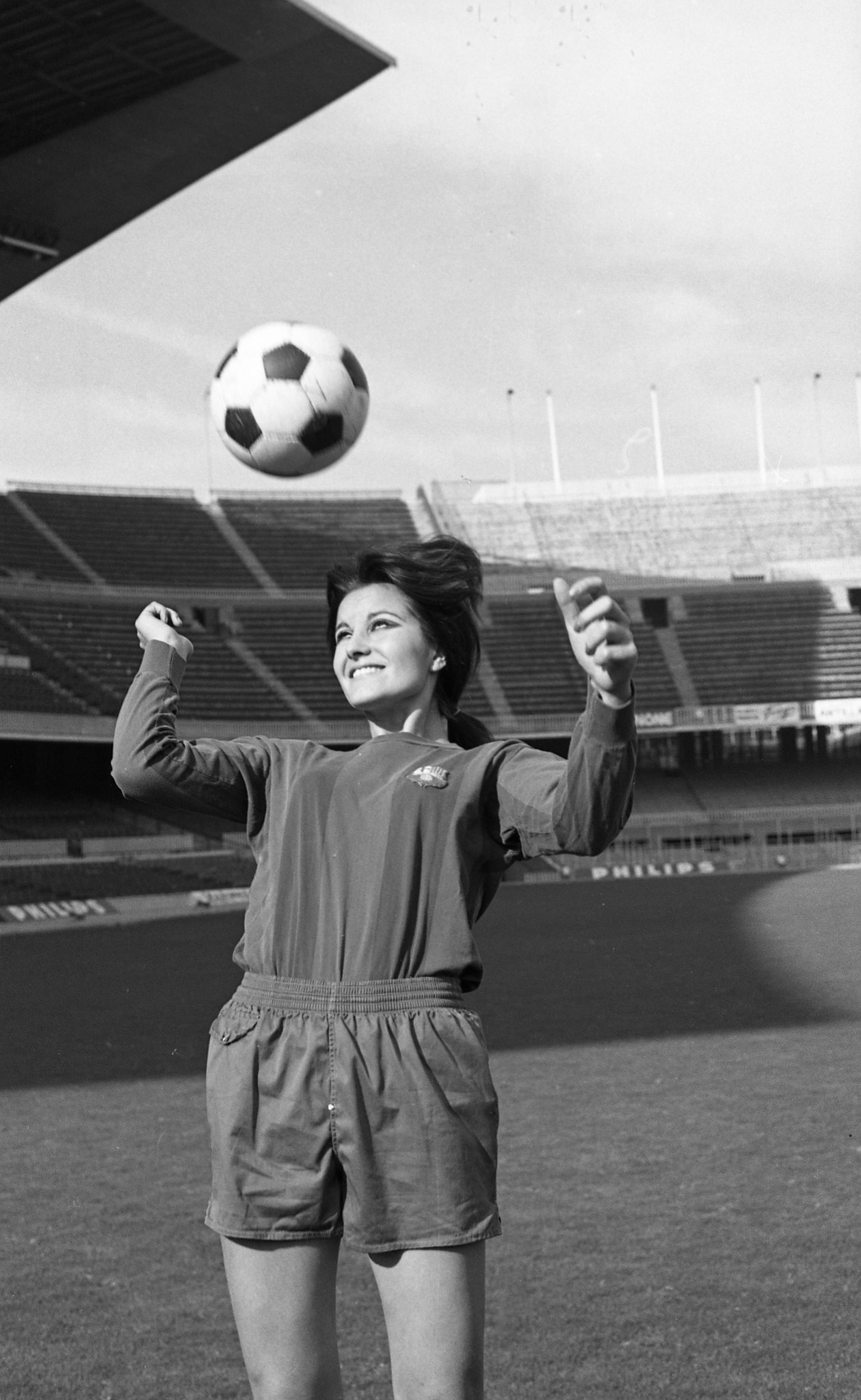
Cabecerán in 1970

By the third matchday, Barcelona's reputation for goalscoring meant they sold out the away stadium, with other teams wanting to take on the "unbeatable" Barcelona squad. They remained unbeaten by June, when Cabecerán announced that she was "hanging up her boots" and leaving football; Barcelona's captain as well as a popular player among fans and a major pioneer of women's football in Catalonia, Mundo Deportivo wrote that her contributions would always stay in the memories of fans.

There was an August break between the splits. Ahead of the second split, Pernod also sponsored a tournament between regional representative teams – one representing Catalonia and the other representing the "comarca of Vic", with the Catalonia team also coached by Barcelona coach Ramallets. Vic is a city in the Province of Barcelona; in the league, Vic was the top team. The best goalscorer in the league by a margin was Caracuel from Vic; close behind her for much of the tournament was Barcelona's Vicenta Pubill i Font, who Mundo Deportivo called the team's "Cañoncito pum". After 14 games played, Pubill had scored 14 goals.

On 19 November 1971, Barcelona (having not played for two weeks) were overall leaders of the league. In the second split, Barcelona experienced some misfortune as well as overconfidence, both costing them results, and fell out of the title race; ahead of the last matchday they could still achieve third place depending on results, but did not.

During the second split, Llansà played both right-back and as goalkeeper, both well.

In February 1972, it was reported that the same companies were planning the second edition of the Campeonato de Cataluña. The second women's league in Catalonia began in May 1972, but was instead organised by the Francoist organisation Educación y Descanso, with lower participation; Barcelona did not participate.

== Players ==
Nat.	Name	Age	Since	Goals
(Catalonia)	Maria Antònia Mínguez		1970	
(Catalonia)	Giménez/Giméno		1970	
(Catalonia)	Pilar Gazulla		1970	
(Catalonia)	Lluïsa Vilaseca		1970	1+
(Catalonia)	Aurora Arnau		1970	
(Catalonia)	Anna Jaques		1970	
(Catalonia)	Maite/Mayte Rodríguez		1970	
(Catalonia)	Immaculada Cabecerán		1970	1
(Spain)	Núria Llansà "Llera"		1970	
(Catalonia)	Alícia Estivill		1970	
(Catalonia)	Blanca Fernández (number 4)		1970	24
(Catalonia)	Lolita Ortiz		1970	26
(Catalonia)	Consuelo Pérez		1970	
(Catalonia)	Carme Nieto		1970	
(Catalonia)	Fina Ros		1970	
(Catalonia)	Glòria Comas		1970	1+
(Catalonia)	Nuri (Núria Gómez)		1970	3+
(Catalonia)	De Jaime		1971	
(Catalonia)	Vicenta Pubill		1971	19
(Catalonia)	Rosa		1971	11+
(Catalonia)	María Angeles		1971	
(Catalonia)	Trullás		1971	5+
(Catalonia)	Montse		1971	
(Catalonia)	Cárdenas		1971	7+
(Catalonia)	Sans		1971	1+
(Catalonia)	Martínez		1971	
(Catalonia)	Gómez		1971	
(Catalonia)	María Cruz		1971	
(Catalonia)	Azuara		1971	
(Catalonia)	Armella		1971	
(Catalonia)	Merche		1971	
(Catalonia)	Admetlla		1971	
(Catalonia)	Curto		1971	
(Catalonia)	Lolin		1971	
(Catalonia)	Neus Gallofré		1971	
(Catalonia)	María Teresa Andreu (Marisa)		1971	

- Source: Match reports

== Matches ==
=== Friendlies ===
25 December 1970 Exhibition cup	Selecció Ciutat de Barcelona	0–0 (4–3 p)	Unió Esportiva Centelles	Barcelona
11:25 CET		Report		Stadium: Camp Nou; Attendance: 60,000; Referee: Esteve Mateu
	Penalties
	Cabecerán (penalty scored); ? (penalty scored); ? (penalty missed); Cabecerán (penalty scored); ? (penalty missed); ? (penalty missed); Maite Rodríguez (penalty scored)		? (penalty scored); ? (penalty scored); ? (penalty missed); ? (penalty scored); ? (penalty missed); ? (penalty missed); ? (penalty missed)
Note: Played before a match of the men's team.

2 January 1971 Friendly	v	Barcelona	Calella
	Report

6 January 1971 Friendly	C. D. Universitario	2–1	Selección de Barcelona	Barcelona
12:30	15'; Encarna Gambús; (3-2-5) María Vigas; Montserrat Tomá, Pilar Freixas, María Feu; Ana, Antonio Martínez; Cristina Nogués, Conchita Orti, Laura Regueiro, Encarna Gambús, Ana de la Fuente		Maite Rodríguez; (3-2-5) Mínguez; Fernández, Llera, Ros; Vilaseca, Maite; Estivill, Gazulla, Immaculada Cabecerán, Nieto, De Jaime	Stadium: University of Barcelona; Referee: Corpas
Note: The university's team was that which played the 1969 Christmas Day match at Camp Nou, and was composed of Catalan champions in handball and athletics; they played for a trophy donated by the university.

6 March 1971	P. F. Barcelonista	v	At. de Sabadell	Barcelona
17:00		Report		Stadium: Fabra y Coats

25 October 1971	Zaragoza	0–2	Barcelona	Zaragoza
		Report	Blanca 15'; Pubill 33'	Stadium: La Romareda
Note: Match played as inauguration of the new Zaragoza team.

8 December 1971 Friendly	P.F. Barcelona	2–2	Espanyol	Barcelona
18:25	Gallofré; ?			Stadium: Camp Nou; Attendance: 40,000
Note: "Prelude" to a men's team friendly.

25 December 1971 Friendly	Espanyol	v	Barcelona	Barcelona
10:00		Report		Stadium: La Verneda
Note: Played ahead of matches between the CE Júpiter and Espanyol youth teams.

=== Fuengirola Trophy ===
Four teams – Sizam Paloma, Racing de Valencia, Peña Femenina Barcelona, and Polideportivo de Fuengirola – contested the "first women's championship" in Spain, the Trofeo Fuengirola, between 24 January and 28 February 1971.

31 January 1971 Fuengirola Trophy	Racing de Valencia	v	Barcelona	Valencia
		Report

2 February 1971 Fuengirola Trophy	Racing de Valencia	2–0	Barcelona	Valencia
		Report

20 February 1971 Fuengirola Trophy	P.F. Barcelonista	v	Fuengirola	Barcelona
17:00		Report		Stadium: Fabra y Coats

=== Pernod Cup Trophy ===
21 March 1971 Semi-final	Sant Andreu	0–1	C.F. Barcelona	Sarrià
12:45				Stadium: Sarrià Stadium; Attendance: 41,000

28 March 1971 Final	C.F. Barcelona	1–2	Espanyol	Barcelona
12:45	Cárdenas 3'	Report	Encarna 14', 55'	Stadium: Camp Nou; Attendance: 30,000

=== Campeonato de Cataluña league ===
==== First split ====
8 May 1971 1	P.F. Barcelona	6–0	Lérida	Barcelona
18:30	Lolita; Pubill; Cárdenas			Stadium: Sardenya

16 May 1971 2	Calella	0–16	P.F. Barcelona	Calella
12:00			Pubill; Trullás; Lolita; Immaculada; Rosa	Stadium: Campo Municipal de Calella; Referee: Amor

20 May 1971 3	Gramanet	0–5	Barcelona	Santa Coloma de Gramenet
11:45			Blanca Fernández	Stadium: Nou Camp Municipal

22 May 1971 4	Barcelona	4–0	Manresa	Barcelona
18:30	Blanca Fernández			Stadium: La Verneda

29 May 1971 5	Banyoles	0–1	Barcelona	Banyoles
21:30				Stadium: Nou Municipal

9 June 1971 7	Tarragona	1–1	Barcelona	Tarragona
22:30				Stadium: C. Gimnástico

12 June 1971 8	P.F. Barcelona	2–1	Figueres	L'Hospitalet
23:30				Stadium: Estadio de Hospitalet

19 June 1971 9	Espanyol	0–0	Barcelona	Barcelona
18:30				Stadium: La Verneda

24 June 1971 6	Barcelona	4–0	Villanueva	Barcelona
18:30				Stadium: La Verneda
Note: Originally scheduled for 6 June, rain postponed the match to later in the month.

26 June 1971 10	P.F. Barcelona	3–0	Sabadell	Barcelona
18:30	Nuri			Stadium: La Verneda

5 July 1971 11	Badalona	0–2	C.F. Barcelona	Badalona
15:45			Sans; Blanca Fernández	Stadium: Estadi Sant Roc; Referee: E. Pérez

10 July 1971 12	Vic	2–0	P.F. Barcelona	Vic
22:00	Padrós 22'; Roura I 50'

17 July 1971 13	Sant Andreu	0–2	Barcelona	Barcelona
19:00			Blanca Fernández	Stadium: La Verneda

At the end of the first split, Barcelona was second in the league. Its results were:

- 13 matches: 10 wins, 2 draws, 1 loss (22 points)
- 46 goals scored, 4 conceded
- Top goalscorers: Pubill, Blanca (12 each), Lolita (11), and Rosa (5)

==== Second split ====
22 October 1971 14	Lérida	2–1	P.F. Barcelona	Lérida
12:15	A. Alba 7'; Batlle 19'		Pubill 45'

31 October 1971 16	Barcelona	10–1	San Cugat	Barcelona
16:15	Cárdenas; Pubill; Lolita; Rosa; Nuri; Gloria; Blanca Fernández (pen.)		? (o.g.)	Stadium: La Verneda

21 November 1971 19	Manresa	1–1	C.F. Barcelona	Moyá
16:00	Viéguez		Rosa

30 November 1971 20	P.F. Barcelona	3–0	Banyoles	Barcelona
16:00	Lolita; Cárdenas; Rosa			Stadium: La Verneda

8 December 1971	Villanueva	0–9	Barcelona	Vilanova
12:30			Lolita; Blanca Fernández; Rosa; Cárdenas; Nuri

18 December 1971	Industria del Taxi	0–6	Barcelona	La Bordeta
18:00				Stadium: La Palmera

9 January 1972	Sabadell	1–1	P.F. Barcelona	Sabadell
12:30	Nuri		Rosa	Stadium: La Riereta
Note: Rescheduled multiple times due to being rained out.

23 January 1972	Barcelona	0–1	Espanyol	Barcelona
12:30			Montse	Stadium: La Verneda

30 January 1972 21	Mataró	1–5	Barcelona	Mataró
	Montserrat Sánchez 10'	Report	Cárdenas 7'; Blanca Fernández 9', 18' (pen.); Lolita	Referee: Amor
Note: Rescheduled various times.

6 February 1972	P.F. Barcelona	5–0	Badalona	Barcelona
16:30	Blanca Fernández 5', 15', 34'; Lolita 17', 40'			Stadium: La Verneda; Referee: Calí
Note: Badalona's team left the pitch for 15 minutes in the second half in protest of the result.

12 February 1972	Barcelona	4–0	La Salle–Premià	Barcelona
16:30	Lolita 12', 26'; Pubill 22', 58'			Stadium: La Verneda

26 February 1972 25	Barcelona	1–1	Vic	Barcelona
17:00	Vilaseca 15'		Padrós 34'	Stadium: La Verneda

4 March 1972 26	Barcelona	2–2	Sant Andreu	Barcelona
17:15	Blanca Fernández 30'		Sagrera 14'	Stadium: La Verneda

At the end of the second split, Barcelona finished in fourth place on points. Its results were:

- 26 matches: 17 wins, 6 draws, 3 losses (40 points)
- 94 goals scored, 14 conceded
- Top goalscorers: Lolita (26), Blanca (24), Pubill (19)
