= Lolita Ortiz =

Catalan footballer (born 1944)

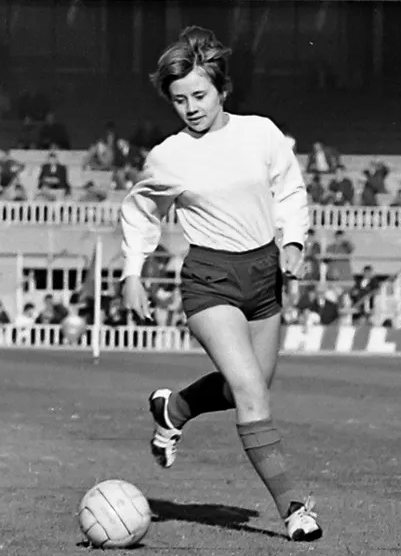
- Ortiz in 1970

Personal information
- Full name: Dolors Ortiz Castañer
- Date of birth: 4 August 1944
- Place of birth: Barcelona, Catalonia, Spain
- Position: Forward

Senior career*
Years	Team	Apps	(Gls)
1970–1981	Barcelona		
- * Club domestic league appearances and goals

Dolors Ortiz Castañer (4 August 1944), better known as Lolita Ortiz, is a Spanish former footballer and women's football pioneer in Catalonia. She played in Barcelona's first-ever match, and then served as the team captain for ten years, from 1971 until her retirement in 1981.

== Career ==
Ortiz, who had been a handball player at Lycée Français de Barcelone, saw the advertisement for a Barcelona women's football team and wanted to try out because of the draw of representing Barcelona. She joined when the team was first created in 1970, playing in the first match on Christmas Day that year. Ortiz helped promote the team and the match in the press beforehand. In Barcelona's inaugural 1971–72 league season, she was the team's top goalscorer, with 26 goals.

When Immaculada Cabecerán suddenly retired in 1971, coach Antoni Ramallets made Ortiz the team's captain, which she remained until her forced retirement a decade later. Ortiz recalled that in one season she was the second-highest goalscorer in the league. She played at the Camp Nou three times. At one point, she kept playing for two months while pregnant after going to the pharmacy for a test and being told it was negative and she could continue playing.

She suffered a career-ending injury in 1981, when she tore both her meniscus and anterior cruciate ligament. She never had her ACL reconstructed, as the doctor to whom the club referred her did not see value in her continuing to play football and said she did not need surgery in order to work her day job.

== Style of play ==
Ortiz quickly drew attention for her dribbling ability, playing as both right-winger and a centre forward. She was a strong striker, and was able to force defenders out of position to create scoring opportunities for teammate Neus Gallofré. Despite being a petite player, she was considered brave in challenging for the ball.

== Personal life ==
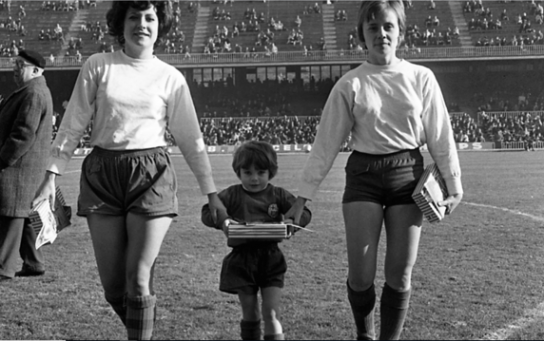
Ortiz (right) and her daughter Arantxa (centre) after the first Barcelona game in 1970

Ortiz is a lifelong fan of FC Barcelona and reportedly as a child, while playing street football with a homemade ball, told friends that she would play for Barcelona one day. As of 2024, she visits the Johan Cruyff Stadium whenever she can to watch Barcelona Femení play. Her family was supportive of her playing football. While playing for Barcelona she worked as a doctor's receptionist.

She moved into an apartment in Avinguda del Paral·lel in 1995; when her son-in-law died in 2012, they discovered that the apartment had unpaid mortgage loans. Ortiz and her son Jordà initially made offers to completely settle the debt and buy the apartment outright, but were rejected. Since then, there have been at least four attempts to evict Ortiz, with interventions from Ada Colau and the FC Barcelona Players' Association making the landlords agree to payment schemes.
