= Selecció Barcelona 0–0 UE Centelles =

1970 women's football match in Spain

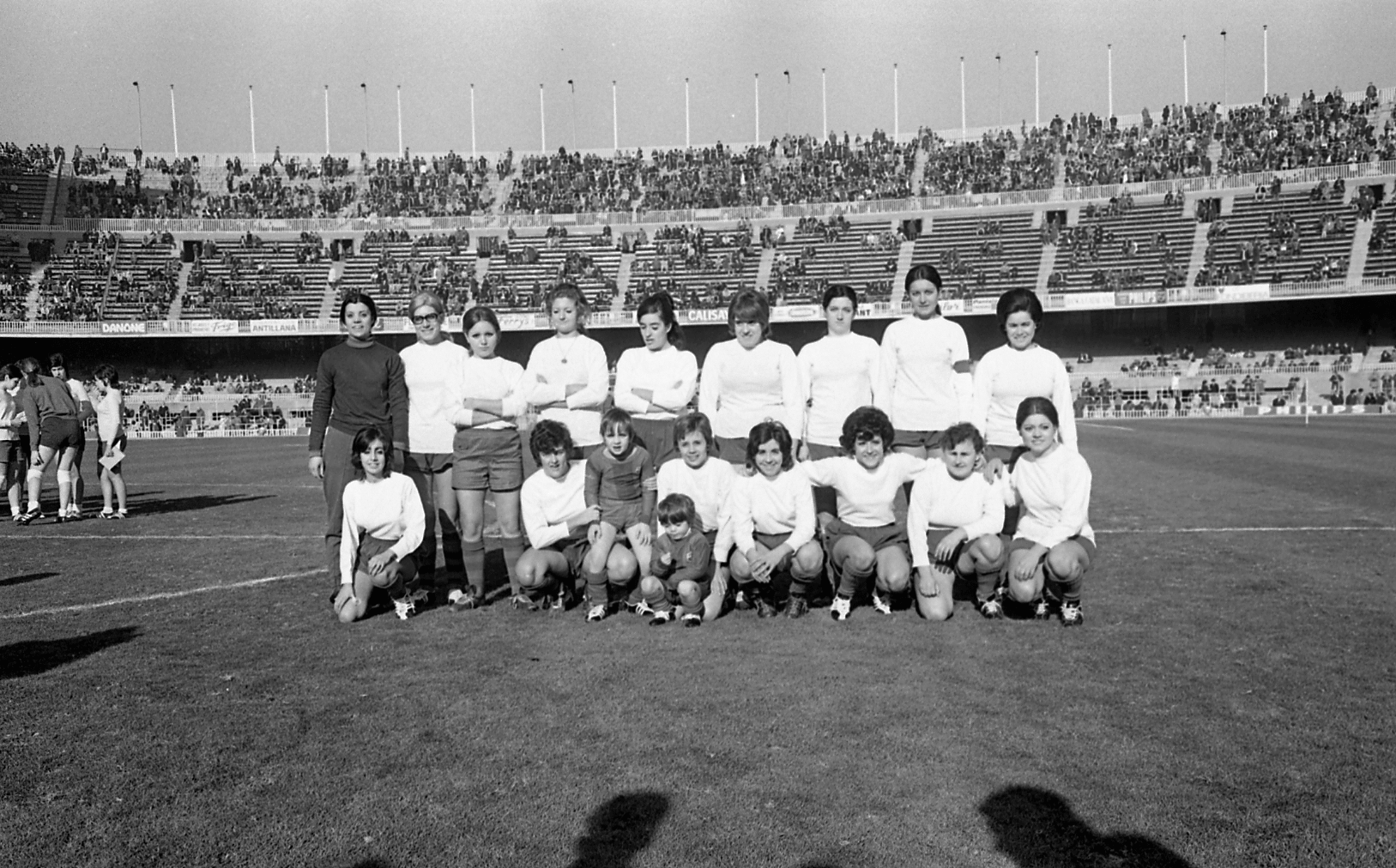
- The Barcelona team before the match
Selecció Ciutat de Barcelona	Unió Esportiva Centelles
0	0
- Barcelona won 4–3 on penalties
- Date: 25 December 1970
- Venue: Camp Nou, Barcelona
- Referee: Esteve Mateu
- Attendance: 60,000

On 25 December 1970, the Selecció Ciutat de Barcelona (Note: Officially the Selección Ciudad de Barcelona, due to the Francoist rule that football teams must have Spanish names.) played Unió Esportiva Centelles (Note: Officially Unión Deportiva Centelles, due to the Francoist rule that football teams must have Spanish names.) in a non-regulation charity football match at the Camp Nou in Barcelona. It was the first match played by the team that would become FC Barcelona Femení, and was attended by approximately 60,000 spectators; not considered official by FIFA, it would have achieved the record for the highest attendance of a women's club football match. This record has only since been superseded by other matches featuring Barcelona.

== Background ==
Football played at Christmastime has been popular since the inception of the sport, typically in the United Kingdom. In Spain, charity matches were played by FC Barcelona on Christmas Day from the 1920s until 1970, at Camp de Les Corts and then Camp Nou. The most-attended women's football match by 1970 was the Dick, Kerr Ladies Boxing Day match, a Christmastime match which took place on 27 December 1920 in front of 53,000 spectators.

Women's football in Spain was banned during the Franco dictatorship from the 1930s until 1975, though it had popularity in Barcelona during this period, and more women played football after the regime weakened in the 1960s. On Christmas Day 1969, a very brief (Note: Set to begin at 11:50, followed by a castellers performance, before the men's game began at 12:15.) women's football match was played at Camp Nou before the men's charity game, between CD Universitario and a team of "the best players of other clubs".

The Selecció Barcelona was formed in November 1970; 18-year-old Catalan amateur footballer Immaculada "Imma" Cabecerán was determined to play football seriously, and met with Agustí Montal Costa, then-president of FC Barcelona, to ask for support. Montal said that if she had a team, they had the club's backing. A team of 16 was formed and FC Barcelona sent club legends Antoni Ramallets and César Rodríguez to coach the team, with Ramallets staying.

Unió Esportiva Centelles had two women's teams at the time and were much more experienced. They were coached by Ramon Garriga, the coach of the club's boys' team and father of some of the players. Three players from another team also joined them for the match.

== Match summary ==
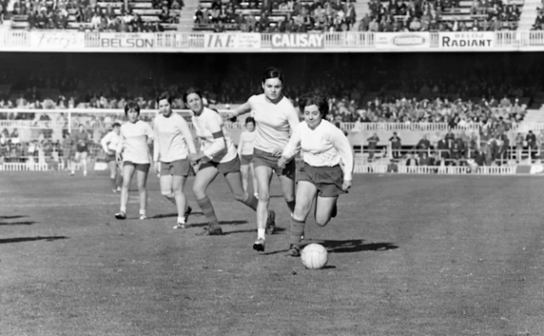
A Barcelona player is pursued while running with the ball during the match

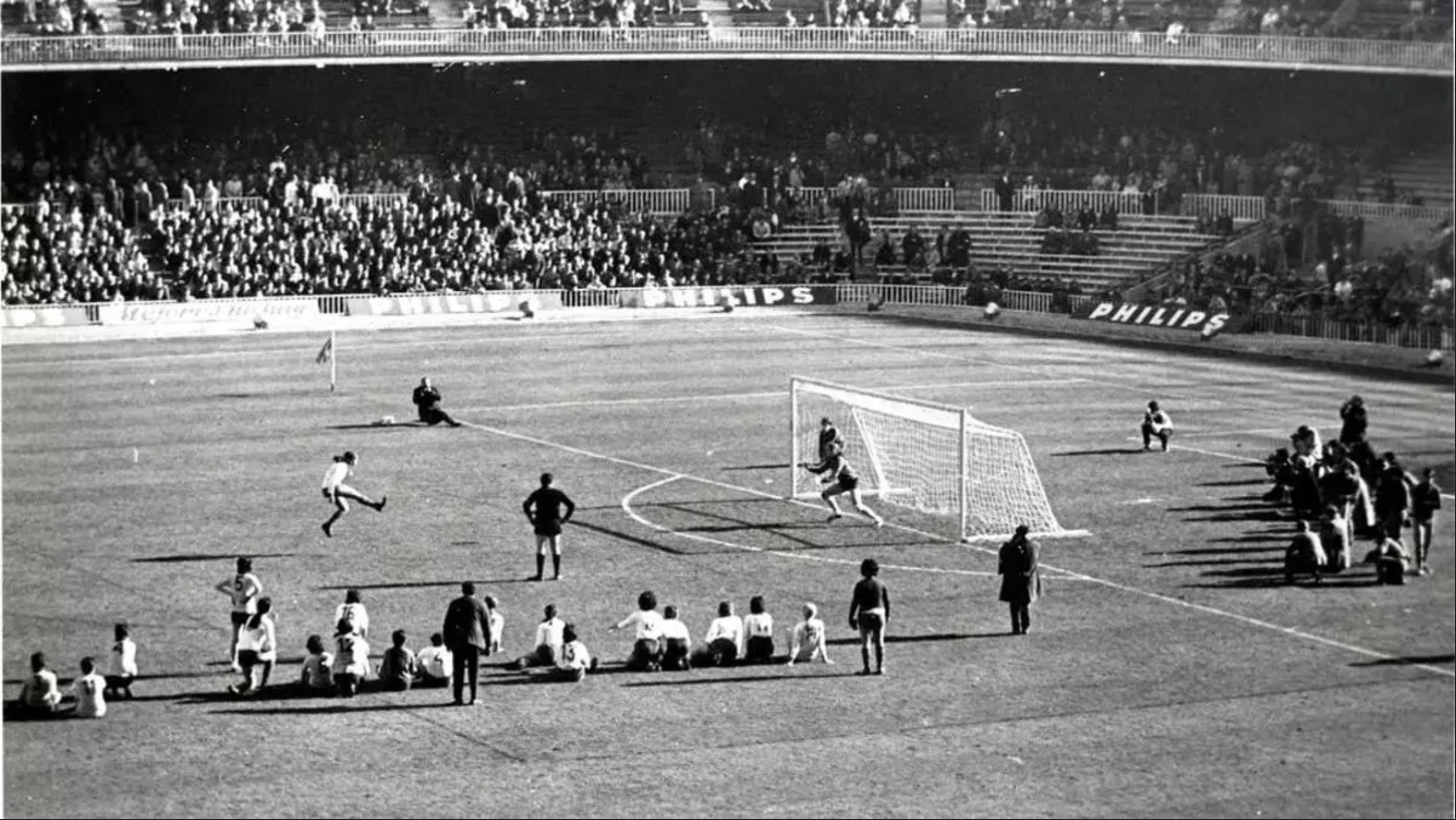
Barcelona score during the penalty shoot-out

The match was part of a programme at the Camp Nou organised by Ràdio Nacional to raise funds for local children's hospitals. Before the match, the marching band of the municipal police performed, as did children majorettes from the penyes of Mollet del Vallès and Esparreguera. The women's match was followed by a men's match, a 1–4 loss to CSKA Sofia. The women's match kicked off at 11:25; the referee was from Centelles, while the atmosphere of the stadium favoured Barcelona.

The match was played irregularly, seemingly to account for the players being women, though they protested the changes. The pitch was marked smaller, with the goalposts set at the edge of the regular penalty area, and each half was set to be 30 minutes (at least in part to make sure there was time for the men's game afterwards), with one report saying the second half was reduced to 12 minutes; a programme published beforehand suggests that the match was only planned to be 25 minutes in total, with a castellers performance set to start at 11:50.

Centelles had a good early chance to score, when they were awarded a penalty after three minutes; Roura took but missed it. The match ended in a goalless draw, with penalties used to decide a winner; initially, penalty kicks were taken in sets of three, with Barcelona kicking three, then Centelles kicking three. When two rounds of this continued to produce matching results, the shoot-out was taken to sudden death. Barcelona scored their first kick in this format, and Centelles did not.

Cabecerán, the Barcelona captain, was handed a trophy, and the team received a standing ovation from the stadium, with a contemporary report saying that the team left a good impression among Barcelona fans. Despite this, the players remembered some of the response to be machismo; it was reported that when one player was substituted, Pedro Ruiz remarked that she must have broken her bra. Some of the media reports were also demeaning of the players, though one wrote that they expected the women to play poorly and were pleasantly surprised this was not the case.

== Match details ==
25 December 1970
11:25 CET

Selecció Ciutat de Barcelona	0–0	Unió Esportiva Centelles
	Report
Penalties
Cabecerán (penalty scored); ? (penalty scored); ? (penalty missed); Cabecerán (penalty scored); ? (penalty missed); ? (penalty missed); Maite Rodríguez (penalty scored)	4–3 (Note: The order of penalties within the sets of three is not included in the report; the order used here is only illustrative of the results.)	? (penalty scored); ? (penalty scored); ? (penalty missed); ? (penalty scored); ? (penalty missed); ? (penalty missed); ? (penalty missed)

Camp Nou, Barcelona
Attendance: 60,000
Referee: Esteve Mateu

Selecció Barcelona	UE Centelles

Maria Antònia Mínguez
Núria Llansà "Llera"
Giménez
Pilar Gazulla
Lluïsa Vilaseca
Aurora Arnau
Anna Jaques
Maite Rodríguez
Immaculada Cabecerán (c)
Alicia Estivill
Blanca Fernández
Lolita Ortiz
Consuelo Pérez
Carme Nieto
Fina Ros
Glòria Comas
Manager:
Antoni Ramallets

Rosa Fontseca
Antònia Corominas
Mariló Corominas
Laura Grau
Pilar Vila
Margarita "Marta" Garriga
Montserrat Garriga
Juanita Garriga
Immaculada Fontarnau
Antònia Viñolas
Margarita Freixer
Immaculada Garet
Margarita Fabré
Rosa Riera
Roser Vila
Dolors Vila
Montse Aribau
Marta Vallier
Montse Santigosa
Tere Vila
Teresa Vilasís
Dolors Barceló
Paqui Triguero
Manager:
Ramon Garriga

== Legacy ==
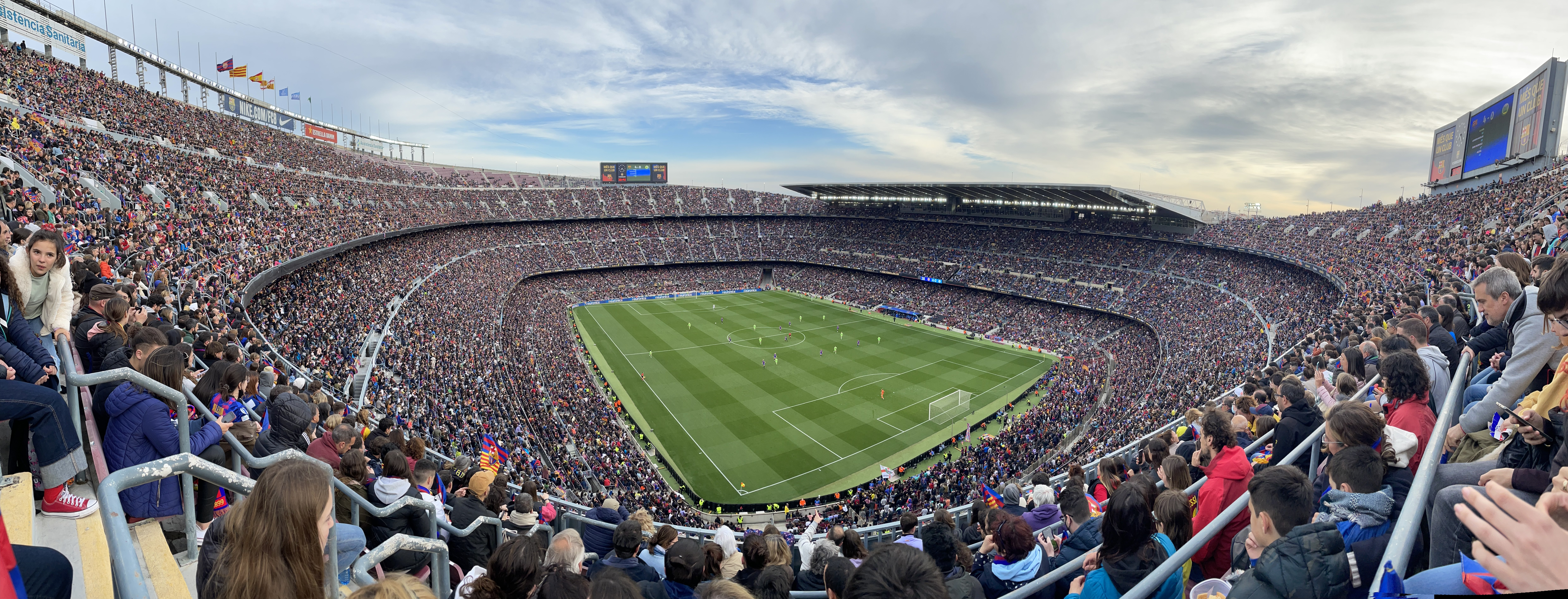
The FIFA record attendance for a women's football match, set at Camp Nou on 22 April 2022, with 91,648 people watching Barcelona defeat Wolfsburg 5–1.

Unlike the Dick, Kerr Ladies' game fifty years earlier, Selecció Barcelona's first match was not remembered for its attendance, though it has kept a place in Barcelona Femení history as the team's beginnings. The original team would play two more matches at the Camp Nou, both against their local rivals, RCD Espanyol, in 1971; the second of these had an attendance of 40,000. The modern Barcelona Femení team (officially made part of FC Barcelona in 1988) played their first match at the Camp Nou on 6 January 2021 as a 50th anniversary celebration of their original founding, also against Espanyol; the attendance for this match was 0, as it was played behind closed doors due to the COVID-19 pandemic. However, Barcelona had already superseded the record women's club football match attendance, playing to a crowd of 60,739 in March 2019 for an away victory against Atlético Madrid at the Metropolitano Stadium. In 2022, Barcelona would bring the record back to the Camp Nou first in a Women's Clásico win against Real Madrid in front of 91,553, before extending this to 91,648 spectators for their defeat of VfL Wolfsburg. Barcelona's (all sections) 2021–22 away kit was lilac, a colour representing feminism, to honour the anniversary, with a commemorative match involving some of the original 1970 team also played that season.
