= Pyrénées International Women's Cup =

Football competition

The Pyrénées International Women's Cup, also known previously as Femení Cup and International Women's Cup, was an annual friendly women's football competition for charitable purposes held between 2006 and 2012.

The IWC's first four editions were carried out in Catalonia, Spain with Sitges serving as host in 2006 and 2007, Salou in 2008 and 2009, and Tarragona in 2010. The tournament was discontinued in 2011, but a last edition was held the following year in Andorra. RCD Espanyol and Montpellier HSC are the most successful teams in the competition with two titles each.

== List of champions ==
- 2006 (Spain) Espanyol
- 2007 (Spain) Espanyol
- 2008 (France) Montpellier
- 2009 (Spain) Rayo Vallecano
- 2010 (France) Montpellier
- 2012 (Spain) Levante

== Results ==
=== 2007 ===
==== Group stage ====
Team	Pld	W	D	L	GF	GA	GD	Pts
(Spain) Espanyol	2	2	0	0	20	3	+17	6
(England) Charlton Athletic	2	1	0	1	18	4	+14	3
(Spain) Suburense	2	0	0	2	0	31	–31	0

Team	Pld	W	D	L	GF	GA	GD	Pts
(Spain) Sevilla	2	2	0	0	6	0	+6	6
(Spain) Barcelona	2	1	0	1	4	1	+3	3
(Spain) Girona	2	0	0	2	0	9	–9	0

==== Final ====
26 May 2007

Espanyol (Spain)	2 – 1	(Spain) Sevilla
Serna 11'; Rubio 80'	Report	Jiménez 8'

Camp d'Aiguadolç, Sitges
Referee: Salvador Sánchez

=== 2008 ===
==== Group stage ====
Team	Pld	W	D	L	GF	GA	GD	Pts
(France) Montpellier	2	1	1	0	4	1	+3	4
(Spain) Barcelona	2	1	1	0	2	1	+1	4
(Spain) Atlético Madrid	2	0	0	2	0	4	–4	0

Team	Pld	W	D	L	GF	GA	GD	Pts
(Spain) Espanyol	2	2	0	0	12	3	+9	6
(Spain) Sevilla	2	1	0	1	5	7	–2	3
(England) Bristol Academy	2	0	0	2	2	9	–7	0

==== Final ====
19 May 2008

Montpellier (France)	3 – 1	(Spain) Espanyol
Pervier 46'; Roze 83'; Ramos 90'	Report	Cubí 32'

Estadio Municipal, Salou

=== 2009 ===
==== Group stage ====
Team	Pld	W	D	L	GF	GA	GD	Pts
(Spain) Espanyol	2	2	0	0	7	1	+6	6
(Spain) Atlético Madrid	2	1	0	1	6	2	+4	3
(England) Bristol Academy	2	0	0	2	1	10	–9	0

Team	Pld	W	D	L	GF	GA	GD	Pts
(Spain) Rayo Vallecano	2	2	0	0	11	3	+8	6
(Spain) Barcelona	2	1	0	1	2	4	–2	3
(France) Montpellier	2	0	0	2	2	8	–6	0

==== Final ====
17 May 2009

Rayo Vallecano (Spain)	3 – 2	(Spain) Espanyol
Bermúdez 8'; Boho 44' de Pablos 72'	Report	Miranda 25'; Martín 85'

Estadio Municipal, Salou

=== 2010 ===
==== Group stage ====
Team	Pld	W	D	L	GF	GA	GD	Pts
(France) Montpellier	2	2	0	0	4	1	+3	6
(Spain) Espanyol	2	1	0	1	4	3	+1	3
(Spain) L'Estartit	2	0	0	2	1	5	–4	0

Team	Pld	W	D	L	GF	GA	GD	Pts
(Spain) Barcelona	2	2	0	0	9	1	+8	6
(Spain) Levante	2	1	0	1	6	2	+4	3
(Spain) Gimnàstic Tarragona	2	0	0	2	0	12	–12	0

==== Final ====
27 June 2010

Montpellier (France)	4 – 1	(Spain) Barcelona
Plaza 57' de Sousa 64'; Delie 72', 80'	Report	Vilas 43'

Nou Estadi, Tarragona
Referee: Victoria Borislavova

=== 2012 ===
==== Group stage ====
Team	Pld	W	D	L	GF	GA	GD	Pts
(Spain) Barcelona	2	2	0	0	9	1	+8	6
(Spain) Real Sociedad	2	1	0	1	3	6	–3	3
(France) Montpellier	2	0	0	2	2	7	–5	0

Team	Pld	W	D	L	GF	GA	GD	Pts
(Spain) Levante	2	2	0	0	2	0	+2	6
(France) Toulouse	2	1	0	1	3	1	+2	3
(Spain) Espanyol	2	0	0	2	0	4	–4	0

==== Final ====
27 June 2010

Barcelona (Spain)	0 – 0	(Spain) Levante
	Report
Penalties
Unzué (penalty scored); Gómez (penalty scored); Férez (penalty missed); Serrano (penalty scored); García (penalty scored)	4 - 5	(penalty scored) González; (penalty scored) Pérez; (penalty scored) Esteban; (penalty scored) Bernauer; (penalty scored) Simó

Consell General, Andorra la Vella
