= Pilar Gazulla =

Spanish jotera and former footballer

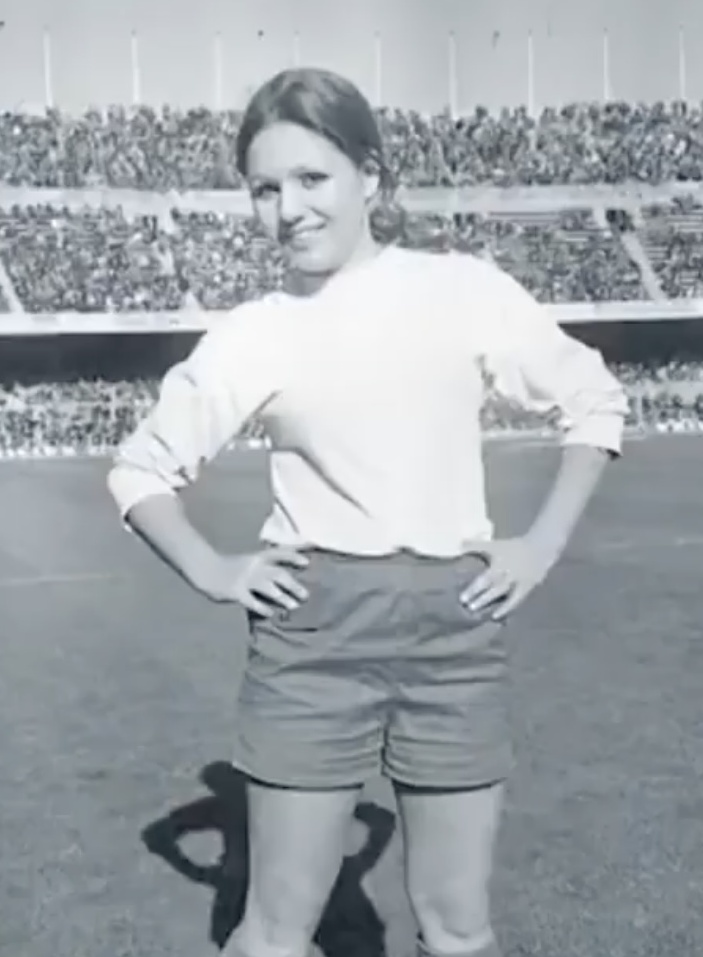
Gazulla with Barcelona in 1970

María del Pilar Gazulla Montero is a Spanish jotera and former footballer.

Pilar Gazulla was born in San Martín del Río, Aragon, Spain, on 12 February 1951. Her father, Joaquín Gazulla Navarro, was a famous jota performer known as El Chamalo. The family moved to Catalonia when Gazulla was six, and she grew up spending time backstage at the Apolo Theatre.

Gazulla joined the nascent FC Barcelona women's team in 1970 as a defender, ahead of their inaugural match and 1971–72 season, and remained with the team until 1976. Her family was not supportive of her playing football, though her husband's family was, and his grandmother bought Gazulla her first pair of boots. Her husband became a delegate of the Barcelona women's team and encouraged Gazulla, from a Spanish-speaking region of Aragon, to become conscious of what it meant to represent Barcelona and Catalonia, especially during the Franco dictatorship. She was known as "Pili Mami" on the squad due to having a child.

She continued dancing jota with her father, including performing the renowned Jota de Calanda broadcast by TVE in 1974. In her hometown there is an ethnographic museum honouring her work in jota.
