= Valais Women's Cup =

Swiss women's football tournament

The Valais Women's Cup was a Swiss invitational women's football tournament played each year in Châtel-St-Denis and Savièse. It was part of the Valais Summer Cups.

== 2013 ==
Held from 22 – 25 September, the inaugural edition was contested by national teams, including London Olympics quarterfinalists Brazil and New Zealand. New Zealand won the tournament, its first trophy outside the OFC since the 1975 Asian Cup.

Semifinals
China	1
Mexico	0
Brazil	0
New Zealand	1

Final
China	0
New Zealand	4
Third place
Mexico	0
Brazil	4

Best player	(New Zealand) Hearn
Best goalkeeper	(Brazil) Thaís

Scorers
	(New Zealand) NZL	(China) CHN	(Brazil) BRA	(Mexico) MEX
3 goals	Hearn			
2 goals			Debinha	
1 goals	White; Wilkinson	Wang L.	Fabiana; Tamires	

== 2014 ==
The second edition was held from 7 – 9 August and switched from national teams to clubs. It was contested by French champion and runner-up Olympique Lyonnais and Paris St.-Germain, Spanish champion FC Barcelona and BeNe League's 8th RSC Anderlecht. The final confronted both French teams, with Lyon winning the trophy.

Semifinals
(Belgium) RSC Anderlecht	1
(France) Olympique Lyonnais	7
(Spain) FC Barcelona	1
(France) Paris St.-Germain (PSO: 1-3)	1

Final
(France) Olympique Lyonnais	3
(France) Paris St.-Germain	2
Third place
(Belgium) RSC Anderlecht	1
(Spain) FC Barcelona	6

Best player	(Norway) Hegerberg (Lyon)
Best goalkeeper	(Spain) Ashurst (Barcelona)

Scorers
	(France) LYO	(France) PSG	(Spain) BAR	(Belgium) AND
3 goals	(Norway) Hegerberg			
2 goals			(Spain) Romero	(France) Crammer
1 goal	(Switzerland) Dickenmann (France) Henry (France) Le Sommer (France) Majri (France) Petit-Franco (Sweden) Schelin (France) Thomis	(Sweden) Asllani (France) Delannoy (Sweden) Seger	(Spain) Caldentey (Spain) Gili (Spain) Hermoso (Spain) Putellas (Spain) Torrecilla	

== 2015 ==
It was held from 14 – 16 August, and it was contested by European runner-up Paris St.-Germain, French champion Olympique Lyonnais, German champion Bayern Munich and Swiss champion FC Zürich. Bayern won the trophy, beating defending champion Lyon in the final.

Semifinals
(Switzerland) FC Zürich	3
(France) Olympique Lyonnais	9
(Germany) Bayern Munich (PSO: 4-3)	0
(France) Paris St.-Germain	0

Final
(France) Olympique Lyonnais	1
(Germany) Bayern Munich	3
Third place
(Switzerland) FC Zürich	0
(France) Paris St.-Germain	3

Best player
Best goalkeeper

Scorers
	(Germany) BAY	(France) LYO	(France) PSG	(Switzerland) ZÜR
3 goals		(Germany) Bremer		
2 goals		(France) Le Sommer	(Germany) Mittag	
1 goals	(Netherlands) Miedema (Germany) Rolser	(France) Abily (France) Cascarino (Norway) Hegerberg (France) Lavogez (France) Nécib	(France) Delie	(Switzerland) Deplazes (Switzerland) Humm (Switzerland) Terchoun
