= Núria Llansà =

Spanish footballer (1937–2019)

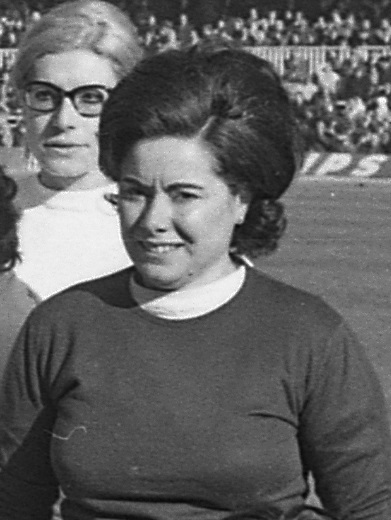
- Llansà in 1970
- Born: Núria Llansà Fernández; 3 November 1937; Barcelona, Catalonia, Spain
- Died: 26 June 2019 (aged 81); Barcelona, Catalonia, Spain
- Other name: "Llera"
- Occupation: Women's football executive
Association football career
- Positions: Goalkeeper; right-back
Senior career*
Years	Team	Apps	(Gls)
1970–1974	Barcelona	17+	
1974–	Espanyol		
International career
1971	Spain		
Managerial career
- 1982–1984: Barcelona Femení
- * Club domestic league appearances and goals

Núria Llansà Fernández (3 November 1937 – 26 June 2019), sometimes spelt Núria Llançà, was a Spanish football player, coach, and women's football executive. She is best known for her association with FC Barcelona Femení, where she spent 32 years.

== Early life ==
Núria Llansà Fernández was born in Barcelona on 3 November 1937. She played basketball for Sans before joining Picadero JC in 1962.

== Playing career ==
Llansà joined the Barcelona women's team in 1970, ahead of their first match, in which she was a goalkeeper. She played as both a goalkeeper and right-back throughout her time at the club, and was part of the back line in the team's match on 6 January 1971, a 1–2 loss. She was in goal for the final of the Catalunya Copa Pernod on 28 March 1971, also held at the Camp Nou, that Barcelona lost 1–2 to Espanyol. During the first half of the 1971–72 season, Llansà shared goalkeeping duties; she made good saves under pressure towards the end of their 2–0 away win over Badalona in July and, though she was in net during the team's first loss of the season on matchday 12, she retained her starting position through the end of the first split.

When the league returned after its summer break, Llansà was on the bench, but was substituted on at half time after Barcelona went 0–2 down. She was the team's first-choice goalkeeper for the remainder of the league season, starting in goal in all but one match. She played at least 17 out of the 26 matches overall, (Note: First split: Second split: Player records are not known for most of the first half of the season.) and made her only appearance as a defender in the league when she started at right-back in their 24th match played, against La Salle–Premià on 13 February 1972. Mundo Deportivo reported that she did the job perfectly. She returned in goal for Barcelona's last two matches, and was considered one of the team's stars.

In February 1971, Llansà was part of the unofficial Spain team who played against Portugal the nation's first-ever international match.

She had initially played under the pseudonym Llera, to hide that she played football from her employers. Outside of football, she worked as a laboratory manager; her family and employers discovered she played football when her real name eventually appeared in the newspaper. As Llansà typically played in goal, she was a stationary target for abuse from people who disapproved of women playing football, some of whom threw rocks at her.

She played for Barcelona until 1974, when she moved to Espanyol. She played for Espanyol in a friendly against Barcelona in March 1974, which Espanyol lost 1–3.

== Coaching and administration ==
Llansà returned to FC Barcelona in the 1980s. In 1982, she began coaching her former team, before becoming the director of the women's section in 1984. This was an involved role, with Llansà organising everything from major infrastructure to checking matchday kits. With no institutional support or anything else in place, Llansà was there "to fill in all the gaps", including sometimes paying for kits and transportation herself so that the players did not have to. It was also a job she was not paid to do, maintaining and developing the section for two decades "out of pure love for women's football". Prior to Luis de la Pena, who coached the team in the 1990s and secured a sponsor, the section's only income was from Llansà and selling raffle tickets.

In 1984 she also became vice president (general secretary) of the women's football committee of the Catalan Football Federation (FCF). She was awarded a gold medal by the FCF in July 1992 for her contributions to women's football.

When Barcelona won the Copa de la Reina de Fútbol in 1994, Llansà was unable to travel to the game because she was sick, but still arranged a bus to take the team. After a dinner, the team returned to Barcelona and immediately went to celebrate at Llansà's house despite it being 4 am.

She pushed for the women's team to be recognised and supported as a section of FC Barcelona in 2002 and, when it was fully incorporated in 2003, Llansà – who was still in charge of the section – stepped away from the club. She also left her role in the FCF at the same time. Upon her retirement, Joan Laporta wrote to Llansà to thank her for directing the women's team, and she received a recognition from the Barcelona Players' Association in 2017.

== Death and legacy ==
Llansà fell into ill health in 2019. In June, she was set to appear at a ceremony honouring the Barcelona team who won the Copa de la Reina in 1994, but could not. A few days later, on 26 June 2019, she died. Her funeral was held on 29 June 2019.

She had kept a meticulous and extensive collection of documents and memorabilia relating to Barcelona Femení from her time as player and the section's president. The documents were privately owned due to the unincorporated nature of the team during the time Llansà was in charge. She entrusted the collection to Carme Nieto, a lifelong friend who had also played in the team's first game; upon Llansà's death, Nieto took the collection with the intention of donating it to FC Barcelona's Documentation and Study Centre. Nieto organised the collection and, due to the COVID-19 pandemic, ended up keeping it at her apartment until 2021.

Due to Llansà almost single-handedly operating the team for much of its history, Sport wrote in 2021 that the success of Barcelona Femení – then establishing dominance in European football – was owed to Llansà's determination and vision for it. Her contemporaries drew the same conclusion and remembered her as being the soul of the team and like a mother to its players.
