= Immaculada Cabecerán =

Catalan footballer (1952–2018)

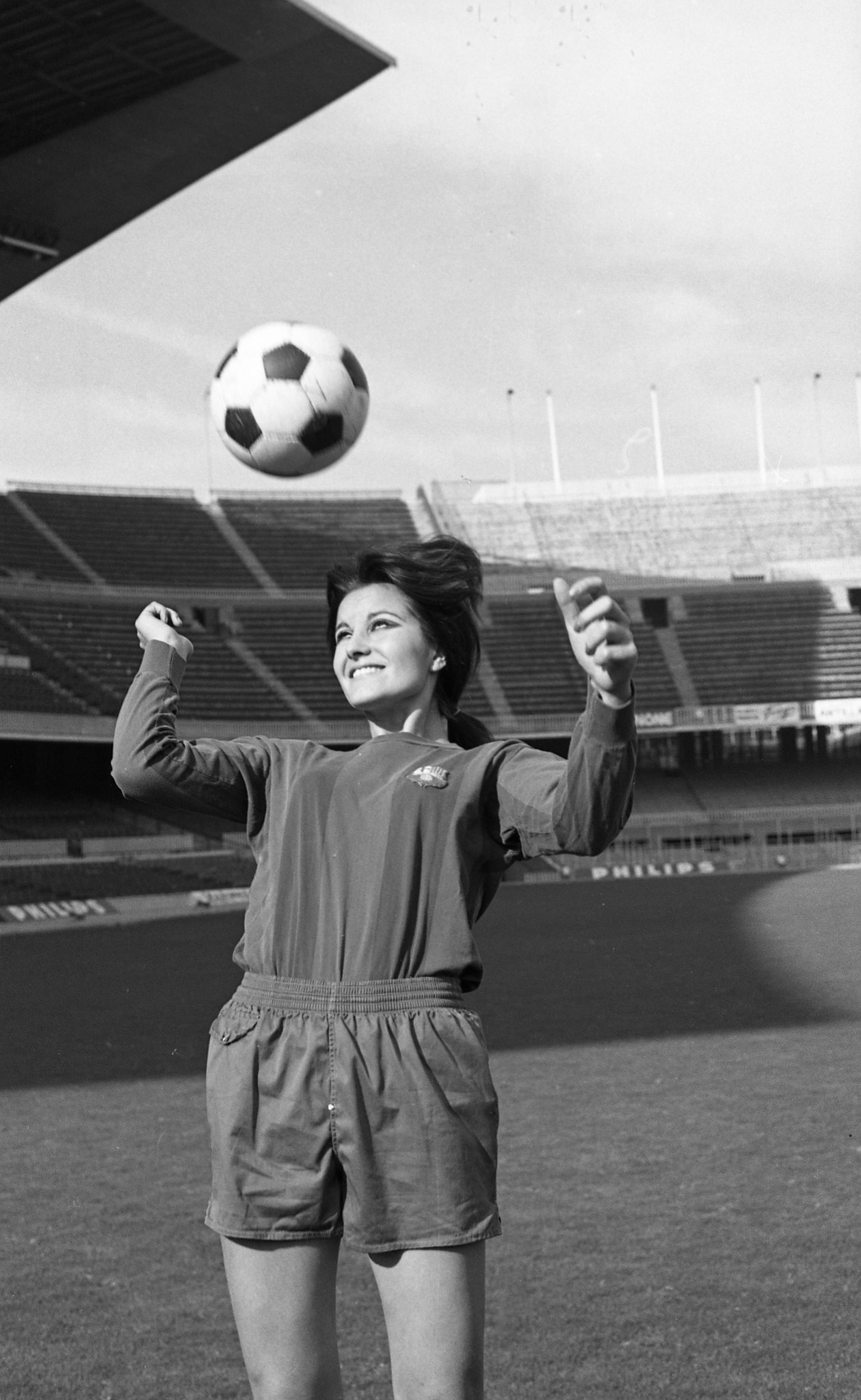
- Cabecerán in 1970

Personal information
- Full name: Immaculada Cabecerán i Soler
- Date of birth: 24 February 1952
- Place of birth: Barcelona, Catalonia, Spain
- Date of death: 11 January 2018 (aged 65)
- Place of death: Girona, Catalonia, Spain
- Position: Forward

Senior career*
Years	Team	Apps	(Gls)
1970–1971	Barcelona	8	(1)
- * Club domestic league appearances and goals

Immaculada Cabecerán i Soler (24 February 1952 – 11 January 2018) was a Catalan footballer and women's football pioneer. Her promotion of the sport in Catalonia led to it becoming popular and formalised, and her ambition created the team that would become FC Barcelona Femení.

== Early life ==
Immaculada Cabecerán i Soler was born in Barcelona on 24 February 1952. When she was young, her father regularly took her and her siblings to the Camp Nou to watch Barcelona play. Cabecerán had an older sister, Montserrat, and a younger brother. She played street football with her brother, though she soon knew she wanted to play club football.

== Career ==
An amateur footballer and Barça fan, Cabecerán approached Barcelona president Agustí Montal Costa in November 1970 with the proposition of a women's team. Cabecerán was the girlfriend of FC Barcelona player García Castany, and had become a friend of María Dinarés, the widow of Vicente Piera. Dinarés encouraged her to talk to Montal, who granted Cabecerán a half-hour meeting; the meeting itself drew attention, with some criticism. Montal was positive if ambiguous, saying that FC Barcelona would support a women's team if she had one; word of her plan reached the Barcelona fan magazine Revista Barcelonista, who suggested she run a notice in the magazine asking for players, the same tactic used by Joan Gamper to form FC Barcelona.

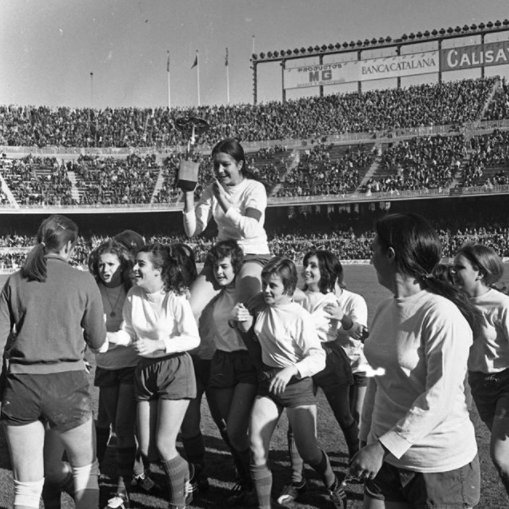
Cabecerán and the trophy are lifted by the Selecció Barcelona team after their inaugural match

Cabecerán was the first captain of Barcelona Femení, known in their first match on Christmas Day 1970 as Selecció Ciutat de Barcelona. She played as a false 9 in the game, which ended in a 0–0 draw and went to a penalty shoot-out that saw each team shoot rounds of three penalties: Cabecerán converted both of her penalty kicks to take the shoot-out to sudden death, with Maite Rodríguez scoring to win for Barcelona. Cabecerán was then handed the trophy to a standing ovation from the 60,000 crowd at the Camp Nou. She lined up as a centre forward in Barcelona's next match, on Three Kings' Day 1971, not scoring in the 1–2 loss.

By this point, Barcelona had rapidly become the most popular women's football team, and were one of the four major Catalan teams to take part in the Copa Catalunya Pernod in March 1971, losing in the cup final against rivals Espanyol at the Camp Nou. Cabecerán's only confirmed goal for Barcelona was scored in their second match of the 1971–72 league (the Campeonato de Cataluña), a 16–0 victory over Calella on 16 May 1971. This scoreline led Barcelona to pack out the away stadium for their next match, and to become known as "unbeatable"; they were still unbeaten in the league by 23 June 1971, when Cabecerán announced that she was "hanging up her boots" and leaving football. Due to her impact on the sport and individual popularity, Mundo Deportivo wrote that her contributions would always stay in the memories of fans.

== Later life ==
She married García Castany in 1971, becoming a housewife. They had two daughters, Patricia (b. ~1973) and Ana (b. 1975), who both played football in Vidreres; Ana García-Castany Cabecerán went on to be a professional football goalkeeper, for teams including Espanyol, and, later, a local politician in Lloret de Mar.

Cabecerán died on 11 January 2018, aged 65, in Girona. A minute of silence was held before the Barcelona Femení match on 14 January 2018. In April 2024, football journalist and Barcelona historian Guillem Balagué proposed that the women's Joan Gamper Trophy be renamed the Imma Cabecerán Trophy. During their era of dominance, Barcelona player Patricia Guijarro said the team were always conscious of Cabecerán's legacy and aimed to be worthy successors to her.
