= FC Barcelona Femení =

FC Barcelona women's football team

Barcelona
- Full name: Futbol Club Barcelona Femení
- Nicknames: Barça Femení, Blaugrana, El Femení (team); Culers, Barcelonistes, Blaugranes, Azulgranas (supporters)
- Founded: 1970; 56 years ago as Selecció Ciutat de Barcelona; 1971; 55 years ago as Penya Femenina Barcelona; 1983; 43 years ago as Club Femení Barcelona; 2002; 24 years ago as Futbol Club Barcelona Femení
- Stadium: Estadi Johan Cruyff; Camp Nou (selected matches)
- Capacity: 6,000
- President: Joan Laporta
- Head coach: Pere Romeu
- League: Liga F
- 2025–26: Liga F, 1st of 16 (champions)
- Website: fcbarcelona.com/womens
Home colours	Away colours	Third colours

Futbol Club Barcelona Femení, commonly referred to as Barça Femení (Catalan pronunciation: [ˈbaɾsə fəməˈni]) (Note: Though "Barça Femení" is Catalan for "Barça Women" (see also femení), it is used in Spanish and English media as well, with minimal use of translated names. The team is occasionally referred to as just "El Femení", when context dictates. In official documents and competition registration, the team is called only "Futbol Club (FC) Barcelona", so "Femení" is not strictly an official name: the club refers to the team as "Femenino" on the Spanish-language edition of its website, while the team's social media handles are "@fcbfemeni".) or simply Barça, is a Spanish professional women's football team based in Barcelona, Catalonia. It is the women's football section of FC Barcelona and competes in the Liga F, the top tier of Spanish women's football, playing home games at the Johan Cruyff Stadium in Sant Joan Despí, and occasionally at the Camp Nou.

The club was formed in 1970 with some financial and logistical support from FC Barcelona, but without being an official section. In its inaugural season it competed in matches against other Catalan teams; it was originally known as Selecció Ciutat de Barcelona before taking the name Peña Femenina Barcelonista in 1971. Shortly after women's football was officially recognised in Spain, the team became known as Club Femení Barcelona in 1983 until 2002, when it officially became a section of FC Barcelona and took the official name Futbol Club Barcelona.

Domestically, Barcelona Femení is the most successful Spanish women's team, with eleven league titles, twelve Copas de la Reina, and six Supercopas, as well as eleven Copas Catalunyas. It also won the previous second tier of Spanish women's football a record four times after battling relegation and fighting for promotion throughout the 2000s.

Since the club's professionalisation in 2015, Barcelona has cemented itself as Spain's dominant women's football team, becoming the league's most successful team in the UEFA Women's Champions League, and one of the most successful women's football teams in Europe. It won the Champions League in 2021, 2023, 2024 and 2026; with its first Champions League title, Barcelona became the first (and only) Spanish women's team to complete a continental treble, and with its third Champions League win, they became the first (and only) Spanish women's team to complete a continental quadruple.

== History ==
=== 1970s: Beginnings ===
Women's football in Spain, particularly Barcelona, had a certain level of popularity in the 1960s, but was amateur, unofficial and technically banned. The "embryo" of Barcelona Femení was the Selecció Ciutat de Barcelona, formed in November 1970. In at least as early as the 1960s, FC Barcelona had women's teams play in exhibition games at the Camp Nou; the club does not consider these as antecedents to its current women's team as they "[were] teams that had been created only for that occasion, unlike Selecció Ciutat [de Barcelona], which was created with the idea of continuity and laying the groundwork for a future project." Upon Barcelona announcing Selecció Barcelona as its new women's team, El Noticiero Universal reported that the club had almost pioneered women's football in Spain "many years earlier", having gone so far as to organise a game that could not be played for reasons beyond their control.

The team was created after footballer Immaculada Cabecerán approached the club with the proposition in November 1970; the resulting team has continuity to the present. The Selecció Barcelona played their first match on Christmas Day 1970, winning on penalties against Unió Esportiva Centelles in front of a crowd of around 60,000 people. Although the team was not officially part of the club structure, it was the first match played by a women's team formally associated with FC Barcelona (then known as CF Barcelona). The women's team then changed its name to Penya Femenina Barça (Peña Femenina Barcelonista) in early 1971, quickly becoming very popular, and played more matches at the Camp Nou with large crowds. PF Barcelona wore the club's blaugrana strip from 1971, without the crest. They were runner-up in the first cup competition in Catalonia, in 1971, before winning the Catalonia-based league in 1973.

The initial strength of women's football in Spain was flagging by 1975, and by September 1977 there was no longer a women's league in Catalonia, with the idea of one also considered somewhat unrealistic. In February 1977, P.F. Barcelona had to publish a call for players in the Revista Barcelonista, with the magazine suggesting there was a crisis in lack of players. It promoted the team as a way to "keep in shape" and look good, rather than emphasising sport. During the down period of the late 1970s, Barcelona was one of the large teams that continued playing, including against women's teams from leagues in other countries. Maria Teresa Andreu, president of P.F. Barcelona at the time, felt that FC Barcelona respected the team, with the club supporting and involving them. A Catalan women's league was established again by the 1978–79 season, with a concurrent cup competition in which P.F. Barcelona Atlético finished as runners-up after losing the final on penalties, before P.F. Barcelona was second in the league in 1979–80.

=== 1981–1988: Lliga catalana and rivalry with Barcilona ===
The Spanish Football Federation (then FEF, now RFEF) formally recognised women's football in 1980 and in 1981 approved for a women's football department of the Catalan Football Federation (FCF) to create the Women's Catalan Football League, of which Barcelona was a founding member. In the 1982–83 season, the team took former player and advocate Núria Llansà as coach, and changed its name. Andreu suggested the team be called Club Femenino/Femení (CF) Barcelona, to be closer to the name of the men's team, with this change made official before the 1983 Copa de la Reina de Fútbol; they were still sometimes known as Penya Femenina Barcelona later in the decade, and were not an official section of FC Barcelona. How the women's team was run had caused a splinter group to leave and form the independent team Penya Barcelonista Barcilona in 1981, led by former Barcelona players Francina and Vicenta Pubill i Font. In terms of titles, Barcilona was much more successful than Barcelona in the 1980s, though the two were considered the teams to beat within Catalan women's football and "fought to the death" in the league. Other top Catalan teams at the time were derbi femení rivals Espanyol and another independent team, Vallès Occidental. Barcelona won its first official competition – the Copa Generalitat/Copa Catalana, a predecessor to the Copa Catalunya — by defeating Barcilona and Vallès Occidental in 1985.

Support from FC Barcelona varied in the era: in January 1983, ahead of the Copa de la Reina, Barcelona did not have fixed training facilities or times (unlike the majority of teams in the league, though Barcilona also did not) and the relationship with FC Barcelona was considered among the worst of women's teams with parent clubs. Reportedly, FC Barcelona "didn't want to know" when it came to them. In 1984, the year Llansà was promoted to director of the women's football team, FC Barcelona was thanked for taking a much more sustained interest in women's football, having offered its stadiums (including the Camp Nou) and facilities. Since at least 1985, the team played most home games at the Mini Estadi. Llansà would remain director until the team was incorporated as an official section of FC Barcelona.

=== 1988–2001: Liga Nacional and inconsistency ===
In 1988, Club Femení Barcelona, which was sponsored by FC Barcelona, was a founding member of the Liga Nacional, the first top-flight national women's league in Spain. Their performances in this iteration of the league were inconsistent from the start, losing to weak teams and beating otherwise unbeatable ones, cementing themselves as a mid-table team. They had a successful three-year run in the early 1990s, placing in the league top three between 1992 and 1994, and winning the 1994 Copa de la Reina. They subsequently declined to bottom table positions but, despite their weaker performances in the later years of the Liga Nacional, always managed to stay in the top division.

Andreu joined the board of FC Barcelona in 2000, and within the year had brought Club Femení Barcelona into the Barcelona Foundation's organisational structure, making the women's team part of the club in administration.

=== 2002–2007: Becoming an official section and Segunda División ===
In 2001, the league was rebranded into the Superliga Femenina due to natural growth; Barcelona was not accepted into the top division, as they could not pay the inscription fee of ₧3 million, and were installed in the new Superliga second division, the lowest tier of national football at the time (though sub-divided by regional group). Llansà pushed for the team to be recognised and supported as a section of the club; in the summer of 2002, the FC Barcelona board unanimously approved ratifying the decision to incorporate CF Barcelona as an official section, and the club rebranded the women's section to Futbol Club Barcelona Femení. The next year, the team nominally became professional, but did not receive livable salaries and still had to maintain other jobs.

Barcelona won its group in the Segunda División in 2002 and 2003, but remained in the second division after unsuccessful appearances in the promotion playoffs. It was eventually promoted to the Superliga Femenina in 2004. Once promoted, the team enjoyed some popularity in the 2004–05 season due to the signing of the Mexican international Maribel "Marigol" Domínguez and the Spanish María Luisa Coimbra, though this did not translate into quality results for the team. Xavi Llorens was hired as manager in 2006 to replace Natalia Astrain, who was among the figures to leave when the club restructured and significantly reduced the women's section in the summer of 2006. Llorens was unable to keep the team in the Superliga, and at the end of the 2006–07 season, the team was relegated and the club considered dissolving the section.

=== 2008–2015: Return to the top flight and first Golden Era ===
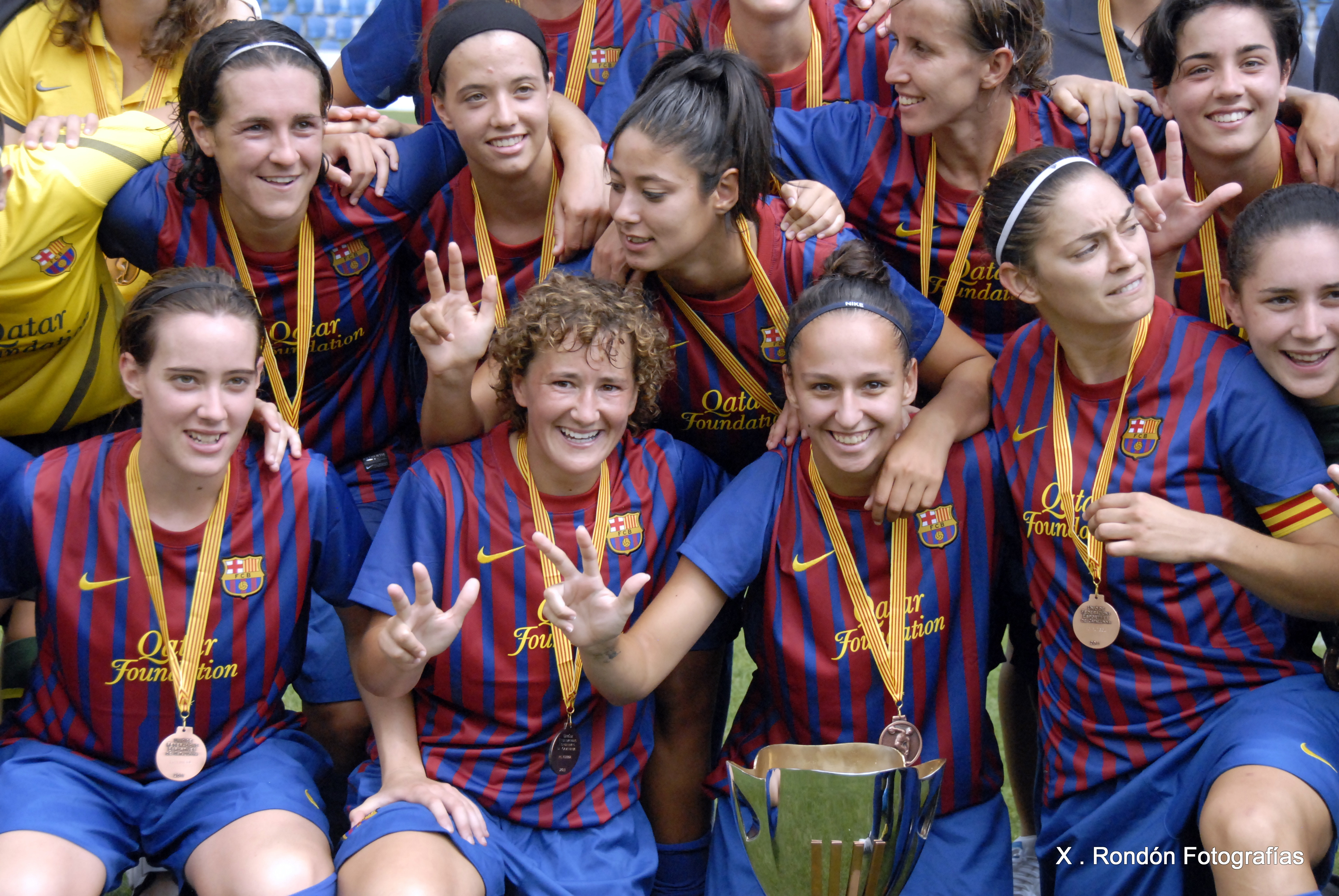
Barcelona celebrating their 2011 Copa Catalunya win

Barcelona returned to the Superliga in 2008, and between 2009 and 2011, they consolidated themselves in top positions in the league table. In 2011, they won their second Copa de la Reina, beating local rivals Espanyol 1–0 in the final. In 2012, they won their first league title with a then-record 94 points, qualifying for the UEFA Women's Champions League for the first time before exiting in the first round. They successfully defended the league in 2013 with a last matchday away win over leading team Athletic Bilbao, before winning the 2013 Copa de la Reina to become the fifth Spanish women's team to achieve the domestic double.

Barcelona qualified for the quarterfinals of the Women's Champions League for the first time in the 2013–14 edition, a season in which they won their third straight league title. Between 17 April 2011 and 11 December 2011, Barcelona maintained a 15-match winning streak, the longest consecutive run in Spanish women's football history by 2015; and between 23 September 2012 and 20 April 2014, they had a 54-game unbeaten run, another record at the time. By the end of the 2013–14 season, the club referred to the previous four years of Barcelona Femení as a Golden Era in which they "absolutely dominated the Spanish football scene", and the team had received their own section in the Barça Museum. In the following 2014–15 season, they became the first team in the Spanish women's league to win four straight league titles.

=== 2015–2018: Professionalism and rivalry with Atlético Madrid ===
In the summer of 2015, the club made the decision to professionalise the women's section. Despite their domestic success, players were unable to make a living playing for Barcelona Femení, and the club knew it could not compete in the Champions League against professional teams from other countries. The team had made a sponsorship deal with Stanley Tools in 2014, which allowed them to become professional, and added a shirt deal in 2018 that made Stanley the first shirt sponsor specific to the women's team. Having not been included in the deal when Rakuten sponsored the men's team's shirts in 2016 allowed Barcelona Femení to sign an exclusivity deal with Stanley for around €3.5 million per year, separating the team's finances and making them individually profitable. With the professionalisation, the club began changes, including bringing in Markel Zubizarreta first as women's team manager in 2015.

Barcelona's domestic dominance ended as they went through the process of becoming professional, with then-captain Vicky Losada later saying that the jump "was a big change" initially, disrupting the team. As part of their new professionalism, Barcelona placed a greater priority on competing in the Champions League, though focused on improving conditions rather than immediately trying to match the level of foreign teams. They reached their first Champions League semi-final in the 2016–17 season, which was compared to the rapid rise of Manchester City W.F.C., who had become professional and then achieved this milestone at the same times as Barcelona.

This period also coincided with Atlético Madrid Femenino "emerg[ing] as a really strong side". Atlético became a challenger to Barcelona's success, and did so by playing with a style that counteracted Barcelona's: a rivalry developed between the teams that Losada described as the women's Clásico. Atlético won the three league titles between the 2016–17 and 2018–19 seasons, and Barcelona were runners-up in each of those seasons.

After struggling against Atlético for a few years, Barcelona beat them in the final of the 2017 Copa de la Reina, in Llorens' final match as coach. Llorens had come in to restructure the women's section in 2006 when it was weak, and his departure also brought about change. Under his replacement, Fran Sánchez, and with Zubizarreta becoming sporting director in summer 2017, Barcelona Femení moved away from its focus on development and integration of youth players. The process briefly changed to signing multiple big names in international football, including England star Toni Duggan and Lieke Martens, who they made the highest-paid female footballer. In the summer of 2018, Barcelona Femení joined the men's team on a pre-season tour for the first time, one of the measures that made The Guardian consider them a groundbreaker in "growing commercial opportunities" and promoting equality for women's football.

=== 2019–2024: The new dynasty ===
Barcelona defeated Atlético at the Wanda Metropolitano on 17 March 2019, in a match that broke the world record for attendance at a women's club football match with 60,739 attendees. Later that season, Barcelona progressed to their first ever Champions League final, meeting and losing 1–4 to five-time Champions League winners Olympique Lyonnais Féminin (Lyon). Sánchez had been replaced by Lluís Cortés in January 2019 and, starting in summer 2019, Barcelona aimed to reduce the number of signings each year, returning to the long-term project of homegrown talent as the basis of the team; Zubizarreta would gain a reputation as the "architect", building the team from youth acquisitions and convincing higher profile players, a "low-cost" method of creating a strong, cohesive team. Barcelona Femení began only incorporating external players who connected to the team's style, with Losada insisting that "the style of the club is sacred." After losing the 2019 Champions League final, the team directed investment to other areas, including improvement in conditions and an expanded support staff. The period from Barcelona's surge in success and cementing of identity in 2019, to the present as of 2024, is described as a dynastic era for the team and as the "new dynasty" of Europe. In 2024, the success of Barcelona Femení was considered by local sportswriters and the FC Barcelona club historian to be the prevailing sense of identity and club narrative for FC Barcelona.

After having been runners-up in all competitions for two years, Barcelona won four titles for the 2019–20 season, but did not reach the final of the 2019–20 Champions League, which the club considered disappointing. Since 2020, Barcelona has won the league and reached the Champions League final every season, while also winning at least one of the Copa de la Reina and Supercopa each year. (Note: See List of FC Barcelona Femení seasons)

They won their first Champions League title by defeating Chelsea 4–0 in the 2021 final. A month later, Cortés left, as the club continued to strive to build on their success and standards of professionalism. Losing their manager did not harm the team: their 2021–22 season is considered one of the most dominant in football. Grant Wahl said the team was one of the best women's sides in history, and attributed their resilience and increasing success to having established a new culture within the team itself. They failed to retain the Champions League this season, but would win it again in the following two. Their 2023–24 season exceeded their previous successes, with the team completing their first continental quadruple by defeating Lyon 2–0 in the 2024 Champions League final; it was their third Champions League title in four years, and their first defeat of European rivals Lyon. Maria Tikas opined that the match confirmed Barcelona as the new holders of the European dynasty.

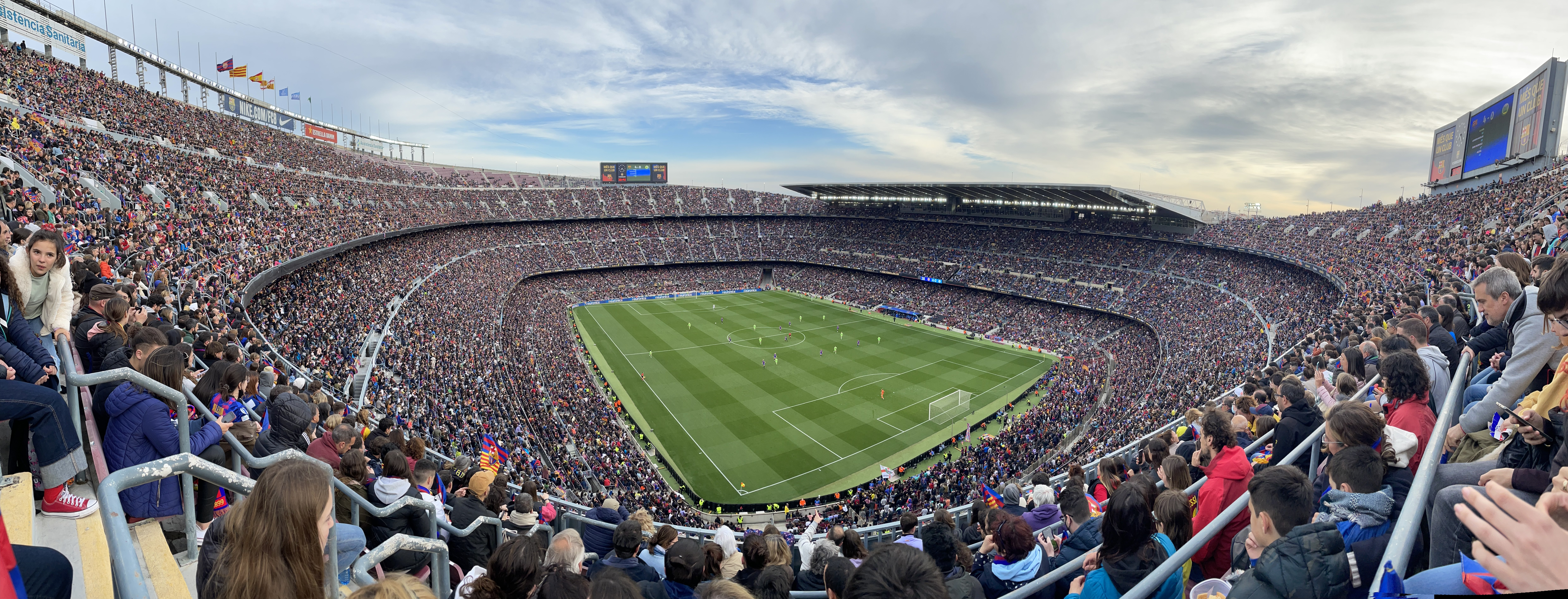
The official record attendance for a women's football match was set at Camp Nou on 22 April 2022, with 91,648 people watching Barcelona defeat Wolfsburg 5–1 (pictured).

During this period, the team also dominated individual awards: captain Alexia Putellas swept all individual awards for two seasons (corresponding to 2020–21 and 2021–22), with Aitana Bonmatí then winning all individual titles for the 2022–23 season. Including her achievements with the Spain national team, Bonmatí had the most decorated season of any footballer, male or female. Other records set by the team include twice setting the highest-ever attendance for a women's football match – Barcelona beat Real Madrid and then Wolfsburg at the Camp Nou, with respective attendances of 91,553 and 91,648 – and breaking the world record for a transfer fee in women's football to bring Keira Walsh from Manchester City in the summer of 2022.

The team's dominance in Spain also reached new heights after they summarily defeated main rivals Atlético 7–0 in the 2021–22 Supercopa final. That season, they had mathematically won the league by March. Real Madrid incorporated its women's team in 2020, aiming to challenge Barcelona's monopoly within Spain; Barcelona has won every women's Clásico as of 2024.

== Supporters and popularity ==
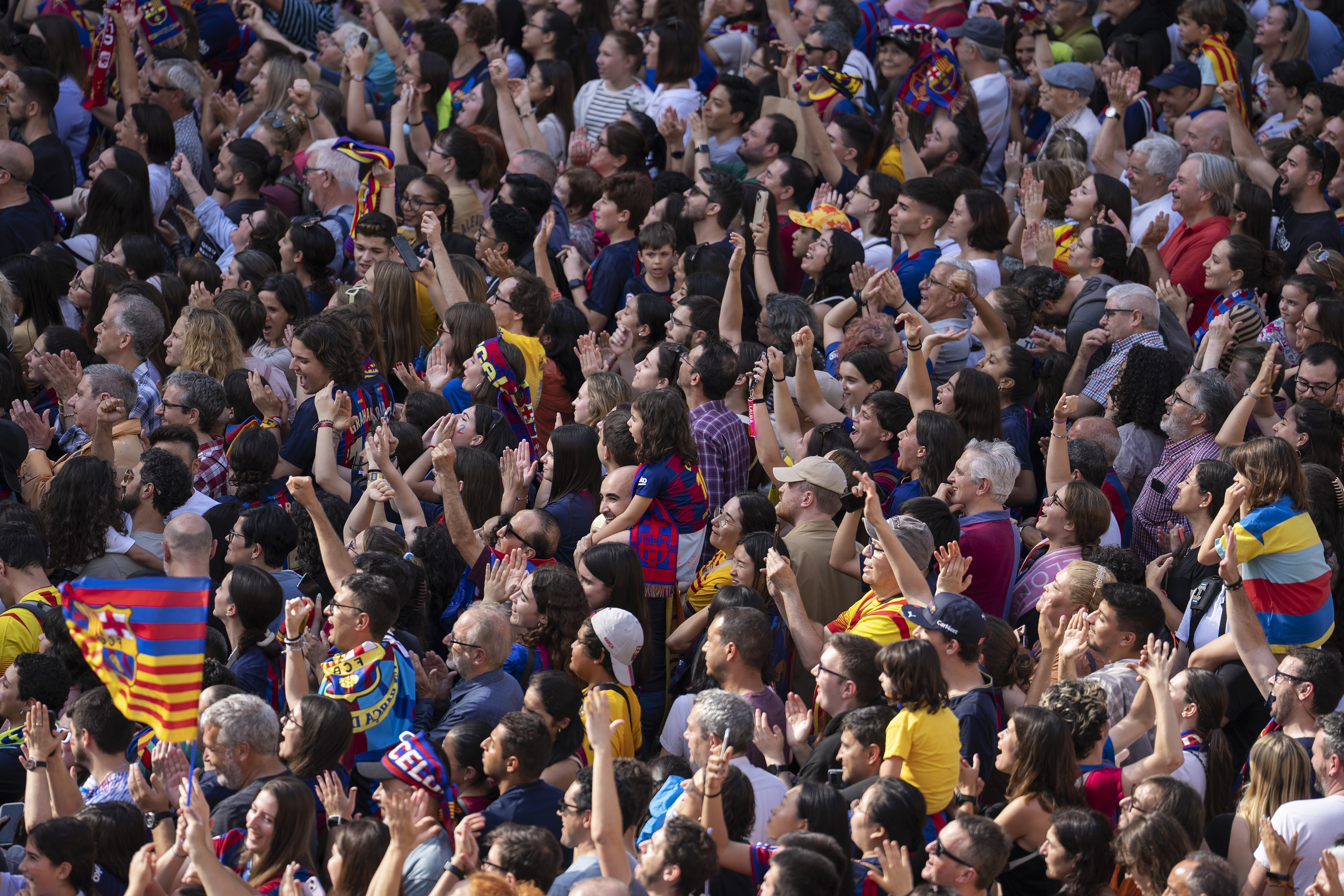
Barcelona Femení supporters at Plaça Sant Jaume in 2023

Barcelona Femení has a fan base distinct from that of the men's team, even when the team has sold out the main stadiums. The popularity of the team grew vastly in the years after it became professional. Part of the reason for the growth in popularity is connected to the growth of feminism in the 2010s. The audience for Barcelona Femení includes both women and men of all ages – reportedly mostly men who do not watch the Barcelona men's team, though, in the 2020s, Barcelona Femení's fan base has grown to include long-time Barcelona fans who have more recently been exposed to and enjoy the women's team's style of play. El Periódico wrote in 2024 that the team plays for people "who have become hooked on [their] way of playing and understanding football". The same year, authors Jim O'Brien and Xavier Ginesta questioned whether the club itself promoted the women's team to be "in the vanguard of genuine change in gender politics" or as a form of brand marketing due to their increased profile and wanting "to breath[e] fresh life into the fading traditions of the club." Supporters of the team typically support feminist values in society and sport, as well as the team itself.

Around the time of their professionalisation, the team made an effort to gain more regular supporters attending matches. Having been dominant within Spain, the staff knew that winning was not enough and worked on ways to engage potential fans. Research conducted around this time suggested that the lack of widespread support for Barcelona Femení was primarily because of the power hierarchy within global and glocalised football that under-appreciated women. By the time Barcelona Femení successively broke the official world record attendance twice in 2022, the increasing support tracked with global trends but also showed the dedication of the domestic support the team had fostered, in part by having many Catalan players promoted as local stars.

The team moved to the Johan Cruyff Stadium in 2019, located in Sant Joan Despí, a town west of the city of Barcelona. They previously played at the Mini Estadi, next to the Camp Nou. Despite playing outside of the city, by 2022 the team had averaged crowds four times larger than when they played at the Mini Estadi. This was attributed by Zubizarreta not to the team becoming more successful, but to the club treating the women's players equal to the men's in advertising and merchandising. The travelling support for the team also grew in this period, attributed by ESPN as a post-COVID-19 development of fans wanting to follow the team in major away games.

In 2022, the audience for Barcelona Femení games was also more varied than that of the men's team, which has been suggested to be due to the fact the women's team did not offer season tickets. The crowd for men's games were mostly season ticket holders and tourists who bought last-minute remaining tickets, while most tickets to women's games were bought as part of four-ticket packs.

== Rivalries ==
Barcelona Femení's first rivalry was against local rivals Espanyol, against whom they played their first matches in 1971. The first league match between them, in 1988, resulted in a 2–2 draw; though most teams in the league at the time were from the Barcelona area, the Derbi Femení was still a highlighted fixture.

The main rivalry for Barcelona Femení was Atlético Madrid, with the two teams having similar prominence and success within Spain and Europe in the 2010s, as well as having playing styles that contrasted each other. Barcelona and Athletic Club Bilbao also shared a rivalry in Spain in the 2000s and early 2010s, seeing large attendances at the San Mamés for their matches. In the 2012–13 season, Barcelona were at one stage 8 points behind Athletic before winning the league on the last day at San Mamés. Barcelona, Atlético and Athletic were the first major professional women's teams in Spain, sustaining league rivalries because they were the three largest teams for quite some time. Most other large clubs (i.e. those with historic men's teams) did not incorporate women's sections until 2018 or later, so the other women's teams prior to this were smaller or independent.

Real Madrid incorporated a women's section in 2020. After their matches that season, Losada dismissed the idea that the teams had a rivalry: "For me, it's not a clásico but on a media level it helps that at last they're in our league. Those who don't follow women's football might think it's a clásico; those that do, know it's not." Real Madrid improved in the following seasons, and though Barcelona did, too – having always beaten Real Madrid by 2024 – staff and players at Barcelona said that a stronger Real Madrid was important to keep up the competitive status of the league and for the global image of the game, with Caroline Graham Hansen saying "[El Clásico] is a big game, a game the whole world knows and it's important that it reflects the level in the women's game."

Barcelona also has rivalries in the Champions League, including against Wolfsburg and Lyon, the latter of which were champions in the first two finals Barcelona lost. After the first lost final, reaching Lyon's level became an aspiration or "obsession" for Barcelona; Lyon were called Barcelona's bestia negra ahead of Barcelona defeating them for the first time in 2024.

== Seasons ==
League performance timeline
Year	85	86	87	88	89	90	91	92	93	94	95	96	97	98	99	00	01	02	03	04	05	06	07	08	09	10	11	12	13	14	15	16	17	18	19	20	21	22	23	24	25	26
Tier	1	1	1	1	1	1	1	1	1	1	1	1	1	1	1	1	1	2 (Note: The league system was restructured and Barcelona admitted to the second division; they had not faced relegation in the previous season, but did not pay the inscription fee for the first division.)	2	2	1	1	1	2	1	1	1	1	1	1	1	1	1	1	1	1	1	1	1	1	1	1
Position (Note: In seasons when only a group system was used, the position in the group is listed first, with the position in the tier overall included in parentheses)	3	4	4	4	4	5	6	2	3	3	7	8	4(11)	2(7)	5(8)	6(15)	4(12)	1(2)	1(3)	1(1)	9	8	14	1(1)	6	5	4	1	1	1	1	2	2	2	2	1	1	1	1	1	1	1

== Record in UEFA Women's Champions League ==
As of match played 30 September 2026

Competition	Pld	W	D	L	GF	GA	GD	Top Goalscorer(s)	Goals
UEFA Women's Champions League	113	83	10	20	320	91	+229	(Spain) Alexia Putellas	32

All results (away, home and aggregate) list FC Barcelona's goal tally first.

^{f} indicates the leg played first.

Season	Round	Opponents	Away	Home	Aggregate	Scorers
2012–13	Round of 32	(England) Arsenal	0–4	0–3 ^{f}	0–7	
2013–14	Round of 32	(Denmark) Brøndby	2–2	0–0 ^{f}	2–2 (a)	Corredera, Čanković
2013–14	Round of 16	(Switzerland) Zürich	3–1	3–0 ^{f}	6–1	Bermúdez (2), Losada, Ruth García, Corredera, Čanković
2013–14	Quarter-final	(Germany) Wolfsburg	0–3 ^{f}	0–2	0–5	
2014–15	Round of 32	(Czech Republic) Slavia Prague	1–0 ^{f}	3–0	4–0	Ruth Garcia, Putellas, Bermúdez, Romero
2014–15	Round of 16	(England) Bristol Academy	1–1	0–1 ^{f}	1–2	Losada
2015–16	Round of 32	(Kazakhstan) Kazygurt	1–1 ^{f}	4–1	5–2	Ruth Garcia, Hermoso (2), Serrano, Unzué
2015–16	Round of 16	(Netherlands) Twente	1–0 ^{f}	1–0	2–0	Olga García (2)
2015–16	Quarter-final	(France) Paris Saint-Germain	0–1	0–0 ^{f}	0–1	
2016–17	Round of 32	(Belarus) FC Minsk	3–0 ^{f}	2–1	5–1	Hermoso (3), Torrejón, Andressa Alves
2016–17	Round of 16	(Netherlands) Twente	4–0	1–0 ^{f}	5–0	Hermoso, Torrejón, Andressa Alves, Latorre, N'Guessan
2016–17	Quarter-final	(Sweden) Rosengård	1–0 ^{f}	2–0	3–0	Ouahabi, Hermoso, Caldentey
2016–17	Semi-final	(France) Paris Saint-Germain	0–2	1–3 ^{f}	1–5	Latorre
2017–18	Round of 32	(Norway) Avaldsnes	4–0 ^{f}	2–0	6–0	Martens (2), Duggan, Andressa Alves, Caldentey, Losada
2017–18	Round of 16	(Lithuania) Gintra Universitetas	6–0 ^{f}	3–0	9–0	Bonmatí, Caldentey (2), Duggan (2), Olga García, Andonova, Putellas, Alekperova (og)
2017–18	Quarter-final	(France) Olympique Lyon	1–2 ^{f}	0–1	1–3	Guijarro
2018–19	Round of 32	(Kazakhstan) Kazygurt	1–3 ^{f}	3–0	4–3	Duggan, Guijarro, Torrejón, Martens
2018–19	Round of 16	(Scotland) Glasgow City	3–0	5–0 ^{f}	8–0	Hamraoui, Bonmatí, Guijarro, Andressa Alves, Mapi León, Duggan (2), Putellas
2018–19	Quarter-final	(Norway) Lillestrøm	1–0	3–0 ^{f}	4–0	Duggan (2), Caldentey, Martens
2018–19	Semi-final	(Germany) Bayern Munich	1–0 ^{f}	1–0	2–0	Hamraoui, Caldentey
2018–19	Final ( (Hungary) Budapest)	(France) Olympique Lyon	1–4			Oshoala
2019–20	Round of 32	(Italy) Juventus	2–0 ^{f}	2–1	4–1	Putellas (2), Torrejón, Van der Gragt
2019–20	Round of 16	(Belarus) FC Minsk	3–1	5–0 ^{f}	8–1	Oshoala, Torrejón, Bonmatí (2), Hermoso, Putellas, Caldentey, Guijarro
2019–20	Quarter-final ( (Spain) Bilbao)	(Spain) Atlético Madrid	1–0			Hamraoui
2019–20	Semi-final ( (Spain) San Sebastián)	(Germany) Wolfsburg	0–1			
2020–21	Round of 32	(Netherlands) PSV	4–1 ^{f}	4–1	8–2	Martens (3), Graham Hansen (2), Hermoso, Oshoala, van den Berg (og)
2020–21	Round of 16	(Denmark) Fortuna Hjørring	5–0	4–0 ^{f}	9–0	Hermoso (3), Bonmatí (2), Putellas, Caldentey, Oshoala, Torrejón
2020–21	Quarter-final	(England) Manchester City	1–2	3–0 ^{f}	4–2	Oshoala (2), Caldentey, Hermoso
2020–21	Semi-final	(France) Paris Saint-Germain	1–1 ^{f}	2–1	3–2	Hermoso, Martens (2)
2020–21	Final ( (Sweden) Gothenburg)	(England) Chelsea	4–0			Leupolz (og), Putellas, Bonmatí, Graham Hansen
2021–22	Group stage	(England) Arsenal	4–0	4–1 ^{f}	8–1	Caldentey, Putellas, Oshoala, Martens, Bonmatí, Hermoso (2), Rolfö
2021–22	Group stage	(Denmark) Køge	2–0 ^{f}	5–0	7–0	Rolfö (2), Hermoso, Ouahabi, Putellas, Engen, Martens
2021–22	Group stage	(Germany) 1899 Hoffenheim	5–0	4–0 ^{f}	9–0	Hermoso, Putellas (3), Torrejón (2), Paredes, Bonmatí, Crnogorčević
2021–22	Quarter-final	(Spain) Real Madrid	3–1 ^{f}	5–2	8–3	Putellas (3), Pina (2), Mapi León, Bonmatí, Graham Hansen
2021–22	Semi-final	(Germany) Wolfsburg	0–2	5–1 ^{f}	5–3	Bonmatí, Graham Hansen, Hermoso, Putellas (2)
2021–22	Final ( (Italy) Turin)	(France) Olympique Lyon	1–3			Putellas
2022–23	Group stage	(Portugal) Benfica	6–2	9–0 ^{f}	15–2	Guijarro, Bonmatí (2), Oshoala (2), Caldentey (2), Crnogorčević (2), Geyse (2), Pina (2), Paredes, Seiça (og)
2022–23	Group stage	(Sweden) Rosengård	4–1 ^{f}	6–0	10–1	Bonmatí (2), Caldentey (2), Oshoala (2), Mapi León, Rolfö, Torrejón, Paredes
2022–23	Group stage	(Germany) Bayern Munich	1–3	3–0 ^{f}	4–3	Geyse (2), Bonmatí, Pina
2022–23	Quarter-final	(Italy) Roma	1–0 ^{f}	5–1	6–1	Paralluelo, Rolfö (2), Mapi León, Oshoala, Guijarro
2022–23	Semi-finals	(England) Chelsea	1–0 ^{f}	1–1	2–1	Graham Hansen (2)
2022–23	Final ( (Netherlands) Eindhoven)	(Germany) Wolfsburg	3–2			Guijarro (2), Rolfö
2023–24	Group stage	(Portugal) Benfica	4–4	5–0 ^{f}	9–4	Putellas (2), Bonmatí (2), Oshoala, Graham Hansen, Guijarro, Bronze
2023–24	Group stage	(Germany) Eintracht Frankfurt	3–1 ^{f}	2–0	5–1	Paralluelo (2), Caldentey, Guijarro, Graham Hansen
2023–24	Group stage	(Sweden) Rosengård	6–0 ^{f}	7–0	13–0	Wik (og)(2), Paralluelo (3), Guijarro, Bonmatí, Caldentey, Martina, Walsh, Graham Hansen, Pina, Torrejón
2023–24	Quarter-final	(Norway) Brann	2–1 ^{f}	3–1	5–2	Graham Hansen, Paralluelo, Bonmatí, Rolfö, Guijarro
2023–24	Semi-finals	(England) Chelsea	2–0	0–1 ^{f}	2–1	Bonmatí, Rolfö
2023–24	Final ( (Spain) Bilbao)	(France) Olympique Lyon	2–0			Bonmatí, Putellas
2024–25	Group stage	(England) Manchester City	0–2 ^{f}	3–0	3–2	Pina, Bonmatí, Putellas
2024–25	Group stage	(Sweden) Hammarby	3–0	9–0 ^{f}	12–0	Graham Hansen (2), Pina (2), Putellas, Mapi León, Pajor (3), Brugts, Rolfö, Bonmatí
2024–25	Group stage	(Austria) St. Pölten	4–1	7–0 ^{f}	11–1	Pajor, Nazareth (3), Bonmatí, Walsh, Pina (2), Graham Hansen, López, Putellas
2024–25	Quarter-final	(Germany) Wolfsburg	4–1 ^{f}	6–1	10–2	Dijkstra (og), Paredes, Paralluelo (3), Schertenleib, Brugts, Pina (2), Mapi León
2024–25	Semi-finals	(England) Chelsea	4–1	4–1 ^{f}	8–2	Pajor (2), Pina (3), Paredes, Bonmatí, Paralluelo
2024–25	Final ( (Portugal) Lisbon)	(England) Arsenal	0–1			
2025–26	League phase	(Germany) Bayern Munich		7–1	1st	Putellas, Pajor (2), Brugts, Paralluelo, Pina (2)
2025–26	League phase	(Italy) Roma	4–0		1st	Brugts, Nazareth, Putellas, Graham Hansen
2025–26	League phase	(Belgium) OH Leuven		3–0	1st	Putellas, Everaerts (og), Paredes
2025–26	League phase	(England) Chelsea	1–1		1st	Pajor
2025–26	League phase	(Portugal) Benfica		3–1	1st	Pajor, Ucheibe (og), Aleixandri
2025–26	League phase	(France) Paris FC	2–0		1st	López, Graham Hansen
2025–26	Quarter-final	(Spain) Real Madrid	6–2 ^{f}	6–0	12–2	Pajor (3), Brugts (2), Paredes (2), López, Putellas (2), Graham Hansen (2)
2025–26	Semi-finals	(Germany) Bayern Munich	1–1 ^{f}	4–2	5–3	Pajor (2), Paralluelo, Putellas (2)
2025–26	Final ( (Norway) Oslo)	(France) Lyon	4–0			Pajor (2), Paralluelo (2)
2026–27	League phase	(France) Paris FC		5–2		Kerolin, Serrajordi, Pajor (2), Graham Hansen
2026–27	League phase	(Italy) Roma	6–0			Graham Hansen (2), Oladipo (og), Pina (2), Pajor
2026–27	League phase	(Denmark) Køge	8–0			Graham Hansen, Pajor, Brugts, Guijarro, Serrajordi, Nazareth, Pina (2)
2026–27	League phase	(England) Arsenal		1-1		Graham Hansen
2026–27	League phase	(Switzerland) Servette		6-0		Bonmatí, Pina (3), Brugts, Graham Hansen
2026–27	League phase	(Germany) Bayern Munich	–			

== Honours ==
=== Official ===
FC Barcelona Femení honours
Type	Competition	Titles	Winning Seasons	Runners-up
Domestic	Liga F	11	2011–12, 2012–13, 2013–14, 2014–15, 2019–20, 2020–21, 2021–22, 2022–23, 2023–24, 2024–25, 2025–26	1991–92, 2015–16, 2016–17, 2017–18, 2018–19
Domestic	Copa de la Reina	12	1994, 2011, 2013, 2014, 2017, 2018, 2019–20, 2020–21, 2021–22, 2023–24, 2024–25, 2025–26	1991, 2016
Domestic	Supercopa de España Femenina	6	2019–20, 2021–22, 2022–23, 2023–24, 2024–25, 2025–26	
Domestic	Segunda División (Group III)	4	2001–02, 2002–03, 2003–04, 2007–08	
Continental	UEFA Women's Champions League	4	2020–21, 2022–23, 2023–24, 2025–26	2018–19, 2021–22, 2024–25
Regional	Copa Catalunya Femenina	11	2009, 2010, 2011, 2012, 2014, 2015, 2016, 2017, 2018, 2019, 2024–25	2005, 2006, 2007, 2008, 2013
Regional	Copa Generalitat/Copa Catalana	4	1985, 1991–92, 1994–95, 1999–2000	1984, 1986

- Record
- ^{S} Shared record

=== Invitational ===
Competition	Titles	Seasons
Joan Gamper Trophy	5	2021, 2022, 2023, 2024, 2026
Getxo Women's Football Trophy	4	2007, 2012, 2013, 2015
COTIF Women's Football Tournament	1	2014
Teide Trophy	1	2022
Sport Mundi Tournament	0	2008 (2º), 2009 (2º)
Pyrénées International Women's Cup	0	2010 (2º), 2012 (2º)
Catalan Football Historics Tournament	0	2009 (2º)
Valais Women's Cup	0	2014 (3º)
Women's International Champions Cup	0	2021 (3º)
AMOS Women's French Cup	0	2022 (3º)

=== Other awards ===
Award	Year(s)	Ref.(s)
Gala de Fútbol Femenino – Extraordinary Award: Record Attendance	2022	
Golsmedia FutbolFest Awards – SuperCampeonas 2022 Award: Best Women's Football Club	2021–22	
IFFHS Women's World's Best Club	2021, 2022, 2023, 2024, 2025	
IFFHS Women's UEFA Best Club	2021, 2022, 2023, 2024, 2025	
Panenka Premi Antonín del Año – Cultural values in Spanish football	2022	
Premio Culer Femenino	2023	
Medalla d'Honor del Parlament de Catalunya	2023	
Ballon d'Or – Women's Club of the Year	2023, 2024, 2026	
Football Content Awards – Best Football Club, Women's Football Gold Award	2023	
Globe Soccer Awards – Best Women's Club of the Year	2021, 2023, 2024 (Eu), 2024, 2025	
World Soccer Magazine – Women's World Team of the Year	2021, 2024	

== Records ==
Bold indicates still-current records

- Highest unofficial attendance at a women's football match: 60,000 (25 December 1970, until 15 August 1971; Barcelona vs. UE Centelles, Camp Nou)
- Highest salary for a female footballer:
  - €250,000 (2017–2018; Lieke Martens)
  - €700,000 (2024–2024; Alexia Putellas)
  - **€1** **million** (2024; Aitana Bonmatí)
- Highest attendance at a women's football domestic league match:
  - 26,000 (5 May 2013; Athletic Club vs. Barcelona, San Mamés Stadium)
  - **60,739** (17 March 2019; Atlético Madrid vs. Barcelona, Metropolitano Stadium)
- Most consecutive victories in all competitions: **45 wins** (from 6 June 2021 to 22 April 2022)
- Most consecutive victories in league competition: **62 wins** (from 6 June 2021 to 6 May 2023, including the 2021–22 season)
- Highest official attendance at a women's football match:
  - 91,553 (30 March 2022; Barcelona vs Real Madrid, Camp Nou)
  - **91,648** (22 April 2022; Barcelona vs Wolfsburg, Camp Nou)
- Most expensive transfer of a women's footballer: €470,000 (7 September 2022, until 2024; Keira Walsh, Manchester City to Barcelona)
- Largest travelling contingent for a women's football match: **40,000** (25 May 2024; Barcelona vs. Lyon, San Mamés Stadium)
- The only Spanish women's club to win all available domestic trophies.

== Players ==
=== Current squad ===
As of 14 September 2026

Note: Flags indicate national team as defined under FIFA eligibility rules; some limited exceptions apply. Players may hold more than one non-FIFA nationality.

No.	Pos.	Nation	Player
1	GK	ESP	Gemma Font
2	DF	ESP	Irene Paredes (third-captain)
3	DF	NED	Renee van Asten
5	DF	ESP	Laia Aleixandri
6	MF	SUI	Sydney Schertenleib
7	FW	BRA	Kerolin
8	DF	ESP	Marta Torrejón (vice-captain)
9	FW	ESP	Clàudia Pina
10	FW	NOR	Caroline Graham Hansen (fifth-captain)
12	MF	ESP	Patri Guijarro (captain)
13	GK	ESP	Cata Coll

No.	Pos.	Nation	Player
14	MF	ESP	Aitana Bonmatí (fourth-captain)
16	MF	ESP	Clara Serrajordi
17	FW	POL	Ewa Pajor
18	MF	POR	Kika Nazareth
19	MF	ESP	Vicky López
21	DF	ESP	Carla Julià
22	DF	NED	Esmee Brugts
23	DF	ESP	Aïcha Cámara
24	DF	ESP	Martina Fernández
25	GK	USA	Tyler McCamey

=== From reserve team ===
As of 29 July 2026

Note: Flags indicate national team as defined under FIFA eligibility rules; some limited exceptions apply. Players may hold more than one non-FIFA nationality.

No.	Pos.	Nation	Player
26	DF	ESP	Julia Torres
27	FW	ESP	Rosalía Domínguez
28	FW	ESP	Lúa Arufe
29	MF	ESP	Carolina Ferrera
30	DF	ESP	Charlotta Ohlander
31	FW	MAR	Mayssa Baha
32	DF	ESP	María Llorella
33	DF	ESP	Daniela Martínez
34	FW	NED	Liv Pennock
35	MF	ESP	Elena Vizuete

No.	Pos.	Nation	Player
36	FW	DEN	Nikoline Nielsen
38	MF	ESP	Laia Cabetas
39	DF	ESP	Noa Jiménez
40	FW	ESP	Lidia Gibert
41	DF	ESP	Martina González
42	FW	ESP	Anna Quer
43	DF	ESP	Julia Pastor
45	FW	ITA	Giulia Galli
46	FW	MAR	Kautar Azraf
—	MF	POL	Emilia Szymczak

=== Out on loan ===
Note: Flags indicate national team as defined under FIFA eligibility rules; some limited exceptions apply. Players may hold more than one non-FIFA nationality.

No.	Pos.	Nation	Player
—	FW	ESP	Celia Segura (at Atlético Madrid)
—	MF	ESP	Ainoa Gómez (at Deportivo Abanca)
—	DF	ESP	Adriana Ranera (at Deportivo Abanca)
—	MF	ESP	Montse Alabart (at Villarreal)

== Current technical staff ==
Position	Staff
Head coach	Pere Romeu
Assistant coaches	Enric Lluch; Marc Soler
Fitness coaches	Berta Carles; Jacob González
Goalkeeper coach	Oriol Casares
Barcelona B coach	Òscar Belis

Last updated: 21 June 2024
Source: FC Barcelona

=== Managers ===
- (Spain) Ramon Carrión (1988–89)
- (Spain) Luis de la Peña (1989–1998)
- (Spain) Salvador Casals (1998–2001)
- (Spain) Natalia Astrain (2002–2006)
- (Spain) Xavi Llorens (2006–2017)
- (Spain) Fran Sánchez (2017–2019)
- (Spain) Lluís Cortés (2019–2021)
- (Spain) Jonatan Giráldez (2021–2024)
- (Spain) Pere Romeu (2024–present)
