= 2012–13 FC Barcelona Femení season =

Barcelona Femení
2012–13 season
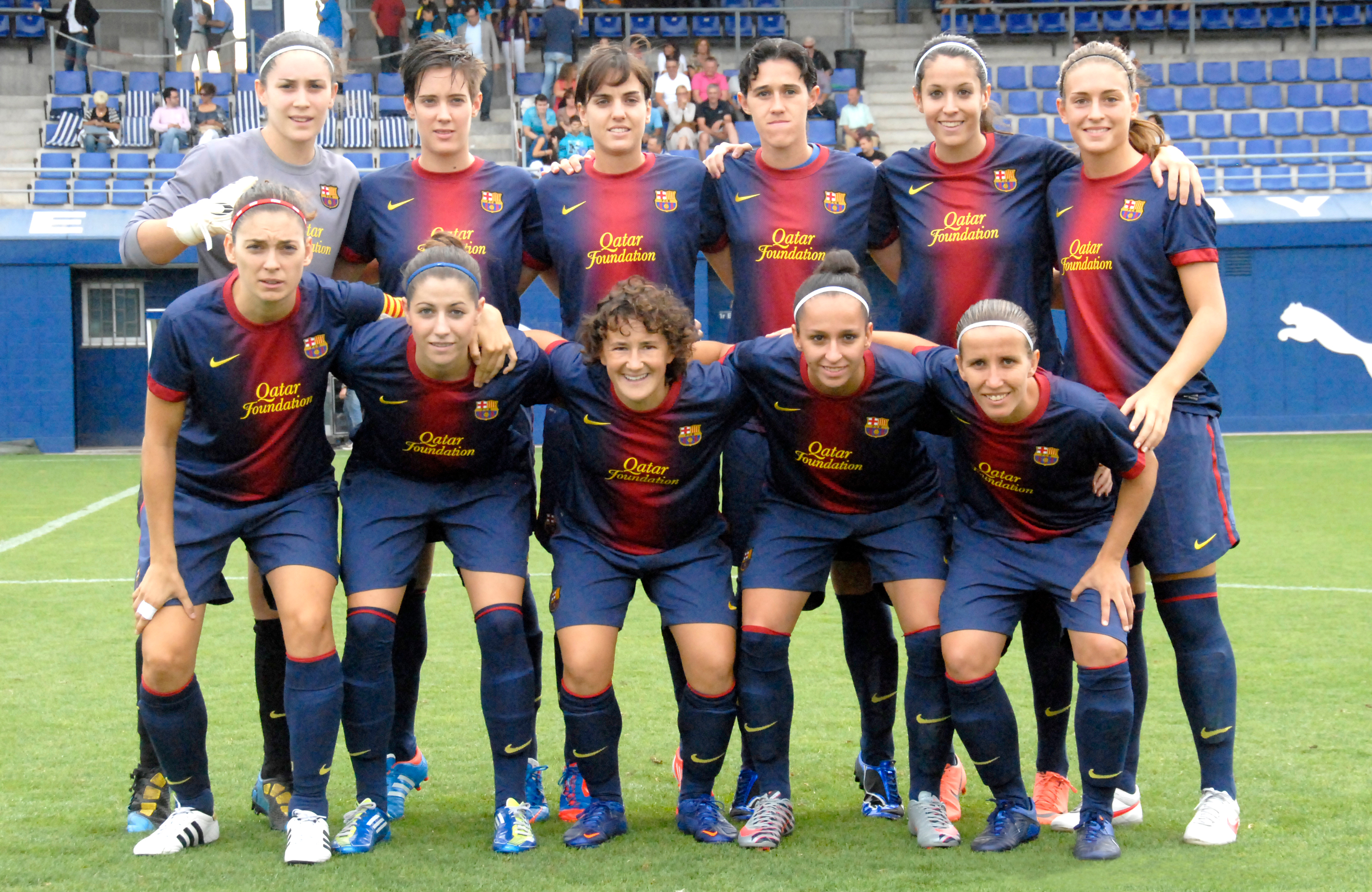
- The team on 2 September 2012
- Primera División: 1st
- Copa de la Reina: Winners
- Copa Catalunya: Winners
- UEFA Champions League: Round of 32
- Biggest win: Home: Barcelona 8–0 L'Estartit; Away: Lagunak 0–11 Barcelona
Home colours	Away colours

The 2012–13 season was the 25th season in the history of FC Barcelona Femení. They won the domestic treble of the Superliga, Copa de la Reina, and Copa Catalunya – the first treble won by the team. However, they were knocked out of the Champions League in the first round.

In the league match on 30 September 2012, Sonia Bermúdez scored four goals, including a 5-minute hat-trick, and Alexia Putellas scored her first senior goal for Barcelona, going on to become their all-time leading goalscorer in 2023.

After losing on the first two matchdays of the league, the team went unbeaten for the rest of the season, starting an unbeaten run in league competition that lasted beyond the next season.

== Players ==
=== First team ===
No.	Pos.	Nat.	Name	Age	Since	App.	Goals
Goalkeepers
1	GK	(Spain)	Laura Ràfols	22	2007		0
13	GK	(Spain)	Esther Sullastres	20	2012	13	0
Defenders
3	DF	(Spain)	Ana María Escribano (captain)	31	2000		
5	DF	(Spain)	Melanie Serrano	23	2003		
6	DF	(Spain)	Marta Unzué	24	2006		
2	DF	(Spain)	Laura Gómez	30	2008		
4	DF	(Spain)	Melisa Nicolau (vice-captain)	28	2010		
	DF	(Spain)	Leila Ouahabi	20	2011		
16	DF	(Mexico)	Kenti Robles	22	2011		
15	DF	(Spain)	Virginia Torrecilla	18	2012	39	3
Midfielders
14	MF	(Spain)	Vicky Losada	22	2006		
19	MF	(Spain)	Carolina Férez	21	2009		
18	MF	(Spain)	Laura Gutiérrez Navarro	19	2010		
	MF	(Spain)	Zaira Flores	19	2010		
	MF	(Spain)	Alba Aznar	19	2011		
8	MF	(Spain)	Míriam Diéguez	27	2011		
17	MF	(Spain)	Gemma Gili	19	2012	33	3
Forwards
7	FW	(Spain)	Marta Corredera	21	2010		
9	FW	(Spain)	Olga García	21	2010		
	FW	(Argentina)	Florencia Quiñones	26	2011		
10	FW	(Spain)	Sonia Bermúdez	28	2011		
11	FW	(Spain)	Alexia Putellas	19	2012	39	13

- Last updated: 22 June 2013
- Source: FCBarcelona.com
- Ordered by arrival.

== Transfers ==
=== In ===
No.	Pos.	Nat.	Player	Moving from	Source
Summer
	GK	(Spain)	Esther Sullastres	L'Estartit	
	DF	(Spain)	Virginia Torrecilla	Sporting Ciutat de Palma	
	MF	(Spain)	Gemma Gili	Valencia	
	FW	(Spain)	Alexia Putellas	Levante	

=== Out ===
No.	Pos.	Nat.	Player	Moving to	Source
Summer
	GK	(Spain)	Elixabete Sarasola	(United States) Colorado Rush	
	MF	(Spain)	Montse Tomé	Oviedo Moderno	
	FW	(Argentina)	Ludmila Manicler	(Argentina) Boca Juniors	

== Friendlies ==
=== Getxo Tournament ===
The Getxo Tournament is contested between Basque women's football teams and top Iberian team invitees.

1 June 2013 Getxo Tournament Round-robin	Athletic Club (Basque Country (autonomous community))	1–0	Barcelona	Getxo
18:45				Stadium: Municipal de Fadura
Note: 40-minute match

1 June 2013 Getxo Tournament Round-robin	Toulouse (France)	0–2	Barcelona	Getxo
19:45				Stadium: Estadi de Bolue
Note: 40-minute match

2 June 2013 Getxo Tournament Final	Barcelona	1–0	(Basque Country (autonomous community)) Athletic Club	Getxo
12:15				Stadium: Municipal de Fadura
Note: 80-minute match

== Competitions ==
=== Overall record ===
Competition	First match	Last match	Starting round	Final position	Record							
Competition	First match	Last match	Starting round	Final position	Pld	W	D	L	GF	GA	GD	Win %
Primera División	2 September 2012	5 May 2013	Matchday 1	Winners	30	24	4	2	91	13	+78	80.00
Copa de la Reina	12 May 2013	16 June 2013	Quarterfinals	Winners	5	4	1	0	11	1	+10	80.00
Copa Catalunya (Note: This table shows results for the 2012 Copa Catalunya, including the quarterfinal played in the 2011–12 season. It does not include the quarterfinal of the 2013 Copa Catalunya played at the end of the 2012–13 season.)	21 June 2012	27 August 2012	Quarterfinals	Winners	3	2	1	0	17	3	+14	66.67
UEFA Women's Champions League	26 September 2012	4 October 2012	Round of 32	Round of 32	2	0	0	2	0	7	−7	0.00
Total					40	30	6	4	119	24	+95	75.00

Source: Competitions

=== Primera División ===
==== Results summary ====
Overall								Home						Away					
Pld	W	D	L	GF	GA	GD	Pts	W	D	L	GF	GA	GD	W	D	L	GF	GA	GD
30	24	4	2	91	13	+78	76	13	1	1	50	6	+44	11	3	1	41	7	+34

Source: bdfutbol

==== Results by round ====
Round	1	2	3	4	5	6	7	8	9	10	11	12	13	14	15	16	17	18	19	20	21	22	23	24	25	26	27	28	29	30
Ground	A	H	A	H	A	H	A	H	H	A	H	A	H	A	H	H	A	H	A	H	A	H	A	A	H	A	H	A	H	A
Result	L	L	W	W	D	W	W	W	W	W	W	D	W	W	D	W	D	W	W	W	W	W	W	W	W	W	W	W	W	W

Updated to match(es) played on 5 May 2013. Source: La Liga
A = Away; H = Home; W = Win; D = Draw; L = Loss; P = Postponed

==== Matches ====
2 September 2012 1	Espanyol	2–0	Barcelona	Sant Adrià de Besòs
	Débora 54'; Brenda 81'	Report		Stadium: Ciutat Esportiva de Sant Adrià; Referee: Israel Simón del Pino

9 September 2012 2	Barcelona	0–2	Rayo Vallecano	Sant Joan Despí
		Report	Jenni 37'; Natalia Pablos 74'	Stadium: Ciutat Esportiva Joan Gamper; Referee: Víctor Manuel Sánchez Rico

23 September 2012 3	Llanos de Olivenza	0–3	Barcelona	Olivenza
		Report	Marta Corredera 4'; Olga García 13'; Soni 77'	Stadium: Ciudad Deportiva Extremadura; Referee: Olivera Vázquez

30 September 2012 4	Barcelona	7–1	Sant Gabriel	Sant Joan Despí
	Marta Corredera 21'; Sonia 32', 35', 37', 80'; Alexia 60'; Guti 82'	Report	Carolina 34'	Stadium: Ciutat Esportiva Joan Gamper; Referee: Pere Barceló Roca

7 October 2012 5	Atlético Madrid	1–1	Barcelona	Majadahonda
	Marieta 52'	Report	Soni 80'	Stadium: Cerro del Espino; Referee: Beatriz Gil Gozalo

14 October 2012 6	Barcelona	4–0	Valencia	Sant Joan Despí
	Alexia 26'; Marta Corredera 55'; Vicky Losada 85'; Soni 89'	Report		Stadium: Ciutat Esportiva Joan Gamper; Referee: Daniel Navarro Jiménez

28 October 2012 7	Real Sociedad	0–3	Barcelona	Zubieta
		Report	Virginia 5'; Carol 26'; Soni 83'	Stadium: Zubieta Facilities; Referee: Azpilikueta Saldías

1 November 2012 8	Barcelona	4–0	Sporting Huelva	Sant Joan Despí
	Soni 20', 31'; Carol 60'; Olga García 75'	Report		Stadium: Ciutat Esportiva Joan Gamper; Referee: Arnau Llompart

4 November 2012 9	Barcelona	6–1	Lagunak	Sant Joan Despí
	Olga García 7', 11', 71'; Soni 38'; Alexia 66'; Alba 85'	Report	Isabel 21'	Stadium: Ciutat Esportiva Joan Gamper; Referee: Cristian López Carvallo

11 November 2012 10	Transportes Alcaine	0–4	Barcelona	Zaragoza
		Report	Marta Corredera 24'; Olga García 48', 54'; Carol 85'	Stadium: Pedro Sancho Stadium; Referee: Miguel Blanco

18 November 2012 11	Barcelona	4–0	Levante Las Planas	Sant Joan Despí
	Alexia 17'; Soni 28'; Torrecilla 56'; Gemma 82'	Report		Stadium: Ciutat Esportiva Joan Gamper; Referee: David Congost Larrosa

25 November 2012 12	Sevilla	1–1	Barcelona	Seville
	Celia 70'	Report	Soni 7'	Stadium: Ciudad Deportiva Cisneros Palacios; Referee: Pedro Rojas Domínguez

2 December 2012 13	Barcelona	5–0	Collerense	Sant Joan Despí
	Soni 9', 40', 66'; Vicky Losada 42'; Carol 74'	Report		Stadium: Ciutat Esportiva Joan Gamper; Referee: Juan Manuel Martón Varas

6 December 2012 14	Levante	0–1	Barcelona	Valencia
		Report	Alexia 51'	Stadium: Poliesportiu de Nazaret; Referee: Miguel Ángel Ruiz García

9 December 2012 15	Barcelona	0–0	Athletic Club	Sant Joan Despí
		Report		Stadium: Ciutat Esportiva Joan Gamper; Referee: Francesc Pagán Baró

16 December 2012 16	Barcelona	1–0	Espanyol	Sant Joan Despí
	Marta Corredera 88'	Report		Stadium: Ciutat Esportiva Joan Gamper; Referee: José Emilio Sánchez Aparicio

13 January 2013 17	Rayo Vallecano	2–2	Barcelona	Madrid
	Saray 10'; Mascaró 81'	Report	Soni 41'; Marta Corredera 51'	Stadium: Ciudad Deportiva Fundación Rayo Vallecano; Referee: Velasco Arribas

20 January 2013 18	Barcelona	4–0	Llanos de Olivenza	Sant Joan Despí
	Alexia 56'; Carol 70'; Olga García 84'; Vicky Losada 88'	Report		Stadium: Ciutat Esportiva Joan Gamper; Referee: Velasco

27 January 2013 19	Sant Gabriel	0–2	Barcelona	Sant Adrià de Besòs
		Report	Estella 75' (o.g.); Alexia 82'	Stadium: José Luis Ruiz Casado; Referee: Ana Zardain López

3 February 2013 20	Barcelona	2–0	Atlético Madrid	Sant Joan Despí
	Marta Corredera 60'; Kenti Robles 90'	Report		Stadium: Ciutat Esportiva Joan Gamper; Referee: Oliver Castaño

17 February 2013 21	Valencia	0–3	Barcelona	Valencia
		Report	Marta Corredera 15'; Alexia 20'; Leila 85'	Stadium: Beniferri; Referee: Óscar Ruiz García

24 February 2013 22	Barcelona	4–0	Real Sociedad	Sant Joan Despí
	Meli 43'; Gemma 52'; Alexia 64'; Kenti Robles 89'	Report		Stadium: Ciutat Esportiva Joan Gamper; Referee: Juan Rodríguez Pontoles

3 March 2013 23	Sporting Huelva	0–5	Barcelona	Trigueros
		Report	Torrecilla 17'; Alexia 22'; Olga García 84'; Carol 86', 90'	Stadium: El Morillo; Referee: Santiago Blanco

10 March 2013 24	Lagunak	0–11	Barcelona	Barañáin
		Report	Olga García 2', 19', 41'; Alexia 7', 31'; Marta Corredera 15'; Vicky Losada 16', 39'; Carol 62', 81'; Meli 75'	Stadium: Servicio Municipal Lagunak; Referee: Abaurrea

17 March 2013 25	Barcelona	6–2	Transportes Alcaine	Sant Joan Despí
	Soni 1', 25', 44'; Olga García 10'; Unzué 11'; Lara 75' (o.g.)	Report	Sara 36'; Ana Borges 52'	Stadium: Ciutat Esportiva Joan Gamper; Referee: Calle Martínez

24 March 2013 26	Levante Las Planas	0–1	Barcelona	Sant Joan Despí
		Report	Olga García 55'	Stadium: Les Planes; Referee: Óscar Sauleda Torrent

14 April 2013 27	Barcelona	2–0	Sevilla	Sant Joan Despí
	Vicky Losada 43'; Suárez 50' (o.g.)	Report		Stadium: Ciutat Esportiva Joan Gamper; Referee: Robas Bondia

21 April 2013 28	Collerense	0–2	Barcelona	Palma
		Report	Míriam 10'; María Antonia 72' (o.g.)	Stadium: Camp Municipal Coll d'en Rebassa; Referee: Juan Antonio Lobón García

28 April 2013 29	Barcelona	1–0	Levante	Sant Joan Despí
	Marta Corredera 40'	Report		Stadium: Ciutat Esportiva Joan Gamper; Referee: García Fuster

5 May 2013 30	Athletic Club	1–2	Barcelona	Bilbao
	Eli Ibarra 45'	Report	Melanie Serrano 3'; Kenti Robles 74'	Stadium: Estadi de San Mamés (1913); Referee: Martínez Santos

Source: bdfutbol

=== Copa de la Reina ===
12 May 2013 Quarterfinals – Leg 1	Rayo Vallecano	0–0	Barcelona	Madrid
		Report		Stadium: Ciudad Deportiva Fundación Rayo Vallecano; Referee: Sánchez Seco

19 May 2013 Quarterfinals – Leg 2	Barcelona	2–0 (a.e.t.)	Rayo Vallecano	Sant Joan Despí
	Míriam 92'; Olga García 94'	Report		Stadium: Ciutat Esportiva Joan Gamper; Referee: Roger Sales Font

26 May 2013 Semifinals – Leg 1	Atlético Madrid	0–3	Barcelona	Majadahonda
		Report	Sonia 25', 62' (pen.), 90'	Stadium: Cerro del Espino; Referee: Miguel Ángel Ortiz

9 June 2013 Semifinals – Leg 2	Barcelona	2–1	Atlético Madrid	Sant Joan Despí
	Sonia 30'; Marta Corredera 90'	Report	Amanda 17'	Stadium: Ciutat Esportiva Joan Gamper; Referee: Pau García

16 June 2013 Final	Barcelona	4–0	Transportes Alcaine	Las Rozas
	Vicky Losada 26'; Sonia 39'; Alexia 41'; Mariela 80' (o.g.)	Report		Stadium: Madrid Ciudad del Fútbol; Referee: Beatriz Gil Gozalo

=== Copa Catalunya ===
Barcelona's quarterfinal match of the 2012 Copa Catalunya, played before 30 June 2012, is considered part of the 2011–12 season. The quarterfinal of the 2013 Copa Catalunya played in June 2013 is considered part of this season.

==== 2012 ====
24 August 2012 Semifinals	Barcelona	8–0	L'Estartit	Manresa
	Càrol Férez 21', 67'; Sònia Bermudez 44', 75', 89'; Meli Nicolau 49'; Alba Aznar 57'; Olga García 79'	Report		Stadium: Municipal del Nou Congost

27 August 2012 Final	Barcelona	1–1 (8–7 p)	Espanyol	Manresa
	Olga García 46'	Report	Mari Paz 4'	Stadium: Municipal del Nou Congost; Referee: Ana Zardaín López
	Penalties
	Bermúdez (penalty missed); Gómez (penalty scored); Unzué (penalty scored); Gutiérrez (penalty missed); García (penalty scored); Diéguez (penalty scored); Escribano (penalty scored); Gili (penalty scored); Nicolau (penalty scored); Férez (penalty scored)		(penalty missed) Gimbert; (penalty scored) Vilanova; (penalty scored) Monforte; (penalty missed) Torrejón; (penalty scored) Mendoza; (penalty scored) Meseguer; (penalty scored) Vilas; (penalty scored) Pereira; (penalty scored) Montagut; (penalty missed) Pomares

==== 2013 ====
A number of Barcelona's top players were unavailable due to being called up for the UEFA Women's Euro 2013.

22 June 2013 Quarterfinals	Sabadell	0–13	Barcelona
			Olga García; Marta Corredera; Alba Aznar; Judith Fernández; Zaira Flores; Gemma Gili; Melania Sierra (o.g.)

=== UEFA Women's Champions League ===
==== Knockout phase ====
26 September 2012 Round of 32 – Leg 1	Barcelona	0–3	(England) Arsenal	Barcelona
19:00 CEST		Report	Beattie 31'; Nobbs 55'; Chapman 67'	Stadium: Mini Estadi; Referee: Christine Baitinger

4 October 2012 Round of 32 – Leg 2	Arsenal (England)	4–0	Barcelona	Borehamwood
16:00 CEST	Beattie 53', 78', 93' (pen.); Little 57'	Report		Stadium: Meadow Park; Referee: Lilach Asulin

== Statistics ==
=== Overall ===
As of 22 June 2013

No..	Pos.	Nat.	Player	Primera División		Copa de la Reina		Copa Catalunya		Champions League		Total		Discipline		Notes
No..	Pos.	Nat.	Player	Apps	Goals	Apps	Goals	Apps	Goals	Apps	Goals	Apps	Goals	Yellow card	Red card	Notes
Goalkeepers
1	GK	(Spain)	Laura Ràfols	20	0	5	0	2+1	0	1	0	29	0	2	0	
13	GK	(Spain)	Esther Sullastres	10	0	0	0	1+1	0	1	0	13	0	0	0	
Defenders
3	DF	(Spain)	Ana María Escribano	8	0	0	0	1+1	0	1+1	0	12	0	0	0	
5	DF	(Spain)	Melanie Serrano	19+2	1	5	0	2	0	1	0	29	1	2	1	
6	DF	(Spain)	Marta Unzué	30	1	5	0	3	0	1	0	39	1	1	0	
2	DF	(Spain)	Laura Gómez	18+4	0	2+3	0	2+1	0	2	0	32	0	0	0	
4	DF	(Spain)	Melisa Nicolau	25+1	2	5	0	1+1	1	2	0	35	3	1	0	
	DF	(Spain)	Leila Ouahabi	0+6	1	0	0	2	0	0	0	8	1	0	0	
16	DF	(Mexico)	Kenti Robles	7+12	3	0+5	0	2	0	1	0	27	3	1	0	
15	DF	(Spain)	Virginia Torrecilla	27+3	3	5	0	2	0	2	0	39	3	3	0	
Midfielders
14	MF	(Spain)	Vicky Losada	28+1	6	5	1	1+1	0	1	0	37	7	2	0	
19	MF	(Spain)	Carolina Férez	9+13	9	0	0	0+3	2	1	0	26	11	0	0	
18	MF	(Spain)	Laura Gutiérrez Navarro	7+9	1	2+1	0	0	0	0+2	0	21	1	0	0	
	MF	(Spain)	Zaira Flores	0+6	0	0	0	0+2	1	0	0	8	1	0	0	
	MF	(Spain)	Alba Aznar	0+5	1	0	0	1+1	3	0	0	7	4	0	0	
8	MF	(Spain)	Míriam Diéguez	23	1	5	1	2	0	1+1	0	32	2	0	0	
17	MF	(Spain)	Gemma Gili	9+15	2	2+3	0	0+3	1	1	0	33	3	1	0	
	MF	(Spain)	Judith Fernández	0	0	0	0	1	2	0	0	1	2			
Forwards
7	FW	(Spain)	Marta Corredera	28+2	10	1+4	1	2	2	2	0	39	13	2	0	
9	FW	(Spain)	Olga García	13+16	14	3+2	1	2+1	6	1+1	0	39	21	1	0	
	FW	(Argentina)	Florencia Quiñones	0+2	0	0	0	1	0	0	0	3	0	0	0	
10	FW	(Spain)	Sonia Bermúdez	23+3	20	5	5	2	3	1+1	0	35	28	3	0	
11	FW	(Spain)	Alexia Putellas	26+4	12	5	1	2	0	2	0	39	13	0	0	
Own goals (0)

=== Goalscorers ===
As of 22 June 2013

Rank	No.	Pos.	Nat.	Player	Primera División	Copa de la Reina	Copa Catalunya	Total
1	10	FW	(Spain)	Sonia Bermúdez	20	5	3	28
2	9	FW	(Spain)	Olga García	14	1	6	21
3	11	FW	(Spain)	Alexia Putellas	12	1	—	13
3	7	FW	(Spain)	Marta Corredera	10	1	2	13
5	19	MF	(Spain)	Carolina Férez	9	—	2	11
6	14	MF	(Spain)	Vicky Losada	6	1	—	7
7		MF	(Spain)	Alba Aznar	1	—	3	4
8	15	DF	(Spain)	Virginia Torrecilla	3	—	—	3
8	16	DF	(Mexico)	Kenti Robles	3	—	—	3
8	4	DF	(Spain)	Melisa Nicolau	2	—	1	3
8	17	MF	(Spain)	Gemma Gili	2	—	1	3
12	8	MF	(Spain)	Míriam Diéguez	1	1	—	2
12		MF	(Spain)	Judith Fernández	—	—	2	2
14	18	MF	(Spain)	Laura Gutiérrez Navarro	1	—	—	1
14		DF	(Spain)	Leila Ouahabi	1	—	—	1
14	6	DF	(Spain)	Marta Unzué	1	—	—	1
14	5	DF	(Spain)	Melanie Serrano	1	—	—	1
14		MF	(Spain)	Zaira Flores	—	—	1	1
Own goals (from the opponents)					4	1	1	5
Totals					91	11	22	124

=== Cleansheets ===
As of 22 June 2013

Rank	No.	Nat.	Player	Primera División	Copa de la Reina	Copa Catalunya	Champions League	Total
1	1	(Spain)	Laura Ràfols	15	4	1	0	20
2	13	(Spain)	Esther Sullastres	6	—	2	0	8
Totals				21	4	3	0	28

=== Disciplinary record ===
As of 22 June 2013

No.	Pos.	Nat.	Player	Primera División			Copa de la Reina			Champions League			Total		
No.	Pos.	Nat.	Player	Booked	(yellow card) (yellow-red card)	Sent off (straight red)	Booked	(yellow card) (yellow-red card)	Sent off (straight red)	Booked	(yellow card) (yellow-red card)	Sent off (straight red)	Booked	(yellow card) (yellow-red card)	Sent off (straight red)
5	DF	(Spain)	Melanie Serrano	2		1							2		1
15	DF	(Spain)	Virginia Torrecilla	3									3		
10	FW	(Spain)	Sonia Bermúdez	2			1						3		
7	FW	(Spain)	Marta Corredera	2									2		
14	MF	(Spain)	Vicky Losada	1			1						2		
1	GK	(Spain)	Laura Ràfols	1						1			2		
16	DF	(Mexico)	Kenti Robles	1									1		
17	MF	(Spain)	Gemma Gili	1									1		
4	DF	(Spain)	Melisa Nicolau	1									1		
9	FW	(Spain)	Olga García	1									1		
6	DF	(Spain)	Marta Unzué				1						1		
Totals				15		1	3			1			19		1

Source: FCBarcelona.com
Ordered by (red card) , (second yellow card) and (yellow card)
(yellow card) = Number of bookings; (second yellow card) = Number of sending offs after a second yellow card; (red card) = Number of sending offs by a direct red card.
