= 2011–12 FC Barcelona Femení season =

Barcelona Femení
2011–12 season
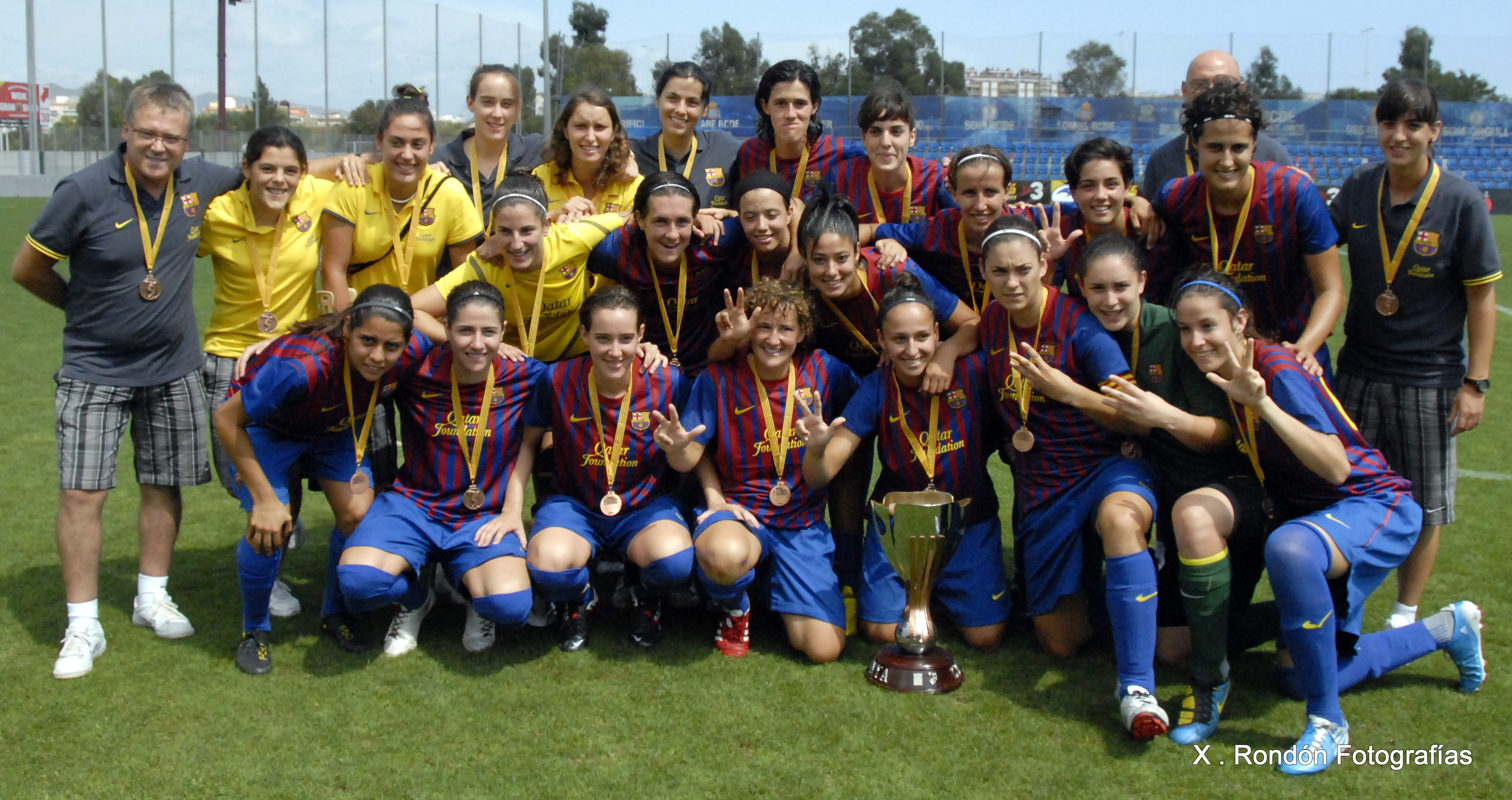
- The team celebrating their 2011 Copa Catalunya victory
- Chairman: Sandro Rosell
- Manager: Xavi Llorens
- Stadium: Ciutat Esportiva Joan Gamper
- League: 1st
- Copa de la Reina: Semifinals
- Copa Catalunya: Winners
- Top goalscorer: Sonia Bermúdez (38)
| Home colours | Away colours |

The 2011–12 season was the 24th season in which FC Barcelona Femení took part in an official league, and the first time they won the Royal Spanish Football Federation top-flight league title. In doing so, they qualified to enter the UEFA Women's Champions League in the following season for the first time. They also won the Copa Catalunya for the third consecutive time.

== Players ==
=== First team ===
| No. | Pos. | Nat. | Name | Age | Since | App. | Goals |
Goalkeepers
| | GK | (Spain) | Laura Ràfols | 21 | 2007 | | 0 |
| | GK | (Spain) | Elixabete Sarasola | 21 | 2009 | | 0 |
Defenders
| | DF | (Spain) | Ana María Escribano (captain) | 30 | 2000 | | |
| | DF | (Spain) | Melanie Serrano | 22 | 2003 | | |
| | DF | (Spain) | Marta Unzué | 23 | 2006 | | |
| | DF | (Spain) | Laura Gómez | 29 | 2008 | | |
| | DF | (Spain) | Melisa Nicolau | 27 | 2010 | | |
| | DF | (Spain) | Leila Ouahabi | 19 | 2011 | | |
| | DF | (Mexico) | Kenti Robles | 21 | 2011 | | |
Midfielders
| | MF | (Spain) | Vicky Losada | 21 | 2006 | | |
| | MF | (Spain) | Carolina Férez | 20 | 2009 | | |
| | MF | (Spain) | Montserrat Tomé | 30 | 2010 | | |
| | MF | (Spain) | Laura Gutiérrez Navarro | 18 | 2010 | | |
| | MF | (Spain) | Zaira Flores | 18 | 2010 | | |
| | MF | (Spain) | Alba Aznar | 18 | 2011 | | |
| | MF | (Spain) | Míriam Diéguez | 26 | 2011 | | |
Forwards
| | FW | (Spain) | Marta Corredera | 20 | 2010 | | |
| | FW | (Spain) | Olga García | 20 | 2010 | | |
| | FW | (Argentina) | Florencia Quiñones | 25 | 2011 | | |
| | FW | (Spain) | Sonia Bermúdez | 27 | 2011 | | |
| | FW | (Argentina) | Ludmila Manicler | 24 | 2011 | | |

- Last updated: 8 June 2012
- Source: BDFutbol
- Ordered by arrival.

=== Reserves ===
Note: Flags indicate national team as defined under FIFA eligibility rules; some limited exceptions apply. Players may hold more than one non-FIFA nationality.

| No. | Pos. | Nation | Player |
|---|---|---|---|
| — | DF | | Villalba |
| — | MF | (Spain) ESP | Carola García |

== Transfers ==
=== In ===
| No. | Pos. | Nat. | Player | Moving from | Source |
Summer
| | MF | (Spain) | Míriam Diéguez | Rayo Vallecano | |
| | FW | (Argentina) | Florencia Quiñones | (Argentina) San Lorenzo | |
| | DF | (Mexico) | Kenti Robles | Espanyol | |
| | MF | (Spain) | Alba Aznar | Gimnàstic de Tarragona | |
| | FW | (Spain) | Sonia Bermúdez | Rayo Vallecano | |
| | FW | (Argentina) | Ludmila Manicler | (Chile) Santiago Morning | |

=== Out ===
| No. | Pos. | Nat. | Player | Moving to | Source |
Summer
| | | | Rocío López | | |
| | | | Esther Romero | | |
| | MF | (Spain) | Noemí Rubio | Retired | |
| | FW | (Spain) | Mari Paz Vilas | Espanyol | |
| | | | Marta Liria | | |
| | | | Elba Unzué | | |
| | | | Sandra Jiménez "Avión" | | |

== Friendlies ==
=== Getxo Tournament ===
The Getxo Tournament is contested between Basque women's football teams and top Iberian team invitees.

==== Group B ====
| 2 June 2012 2 | Barcelona | 3–0 | Oviedo Moderno | Getxo |
| | | Report | | Stadium: Estadi de Bolue |

| 2 June 2012 3 | Bizkerre CF | 0–5 | Barcelona | Getxo |
| | | Report | | Stadium: Estadi de Bolue |

==== Final ====
| 3 June 2012 Final | Barcelona | 4–0 | Levante | Getxo |
| | | Report | | Stadium: Municipal de Fadura |

== Competitions ==
Win Draw Loss

=== League ===
| 4 September 2011 1 | Barcelona | 3–1 | UD Collerense | Sant Joan Despí |
| | Vicky Losada 22', 70'; Olga García 57' | Report | Tania 30' | Stadium: Ciutat Esportiva Joan Gamper; Referee: Jorge Pertegal Méndez |

| 11 September 2011 2 | Sant Gabriel | 0–1 | Barcelona | Sant Adrià de Besòs |
| | | Report | Olga García 18' | Stadium: José Luis Ruiz Casado; Referee: Juan Manuel Martín Varas |

| 25 September 2011 3 | Barcelona | 3–2 | Rayo Vallecano | Sant Joan Despí |
| | Sonia 7'; Marta Corredera 37', 42' | Report | Pili 75'; Natalia Pablos 87' | Stadium: Ciutat Esportiva Joan Gamper; Referee: Víctor Manuel Sánchez Rico |

| 2 October 2011 4 | Levante | 0–2 | Barcelona | Valencia |
| | | Report | Sonia 15'; Montse 56' | Stadium: Poliesportiu de Nazaret; Referee: Miguel Ángel Ruiz García |

| 9 October 2011 5 | Barcelona | 7–0 | SD Lagunak | Sant Joan Despí |
| | Sonia 15' (pen.), 58', 83'; Ani 17'; Unzué 36'; Olga García 62'; Carol 89' | Report | | Stadium: Ciutat Esportiva Joan Gamper; Referee: Gallardo Martínez |

| 12 October 2011 6 | FVPR El Olivo | 1–4 | Barcelona | Vigo |
| | Buceta 38' | Report | Míriam 12'; Sonia 15', 73'; Olga García 70' | Stadium: Pahíño; Referee: Comesana Bastero |

| 16 October 2011 7 | Atlético Madrid | 0–1 | Barcelona | Majadahonda |
| | | Report | Sonia 43' | Stadium: Cerro del Espino; Referee: Jerónimo Montes |

| 30 October 2011 8 | Barcelona | 8–0 | Málaga | Sant Joan Despí |
| | Marta Corredera 15'; Sonia 20', 54'; Míriam 27'; Olga García 33', 39', 87'; Carol 74' | Report | | Stadium: Ciutat Esportiva Joan Gamper; Referee: Gustavo Rebollo |

| 6 November 2011 9 | Zaragoza CFF | 0–4 | Barcelona | Zaragoza |
| | | Report | Sonia 12', 27', 31' (pen.); Míriam 79' | Stadium: Campo Municipal de Futbol Delicias; Referee: Ferrer Collado |

| 13 November 2011 10 | Barcelona | 2–0 | SP Comarca Llanos Olivenza | Sant Joan Despí |
| | Carol 18'; Sonia 50' | Report | | Stadium: Ciutat Esportiva Joan Gamper; Referee: Rubén Ávalos Martos |

| 27 November 2011 11 | L'Estartit | 0–3 | Barcelona | L'Estartit |
| | | | Guti 14'; Olga García 48'; Reche 72' (o.g.) | Stadium: Camp Municipal; Referee: Ana Zardaín López |

| 4 December 2011 12 | Barcelona | 8–0 | Valencia | Sant Joan Despí |
| | Sonia 35', 44', 62', 66'; Marta Corredera 55'; Olga García 58'; Vicky Losada 71'; Alba 74' | Report | | Stadium: Ciutat Esportiva Joan Gamper; Referee: Santiago López |

| 8 December 2011 13 | Real Sociedad | 0–4 | Barcelona | Zubieta |
| | | Report | Vicky Losada 39'; Olga García 49', 69'; Alba 87' | Stadium: Zubieta Facilities; Referee: Fuentes Vicente |

| 11 December 2011 14 | Barcelona | 1–0 | Athletic Club | Sant Joan Despí |
| | Olga García 21' | Report | | Stadium: Ciutat Esportiva Joan Gamper; Referee: Sánchez Aparicio |

| 17 December 2011 15 | RCD Espanyol | 3–3 | Barcelona | Sant Adrià del Besòs |
| | Willy 25'; Mari Paz 33'; Brenda 91' | Report | Olga García 19'; Meseguer 63' (o.g.); Luli 66' | Stadium: Ciutat Esportiva de Sant Adrià; Referee: Navarro Jiménez |

| 8 January 2012 16 | Barcelona | 6–0 | Reocín | Sant Joan Despí |
| | Sonia 11', 16', 26'; Míriam 41', 78'; Luli 83' | Report | | Stadium: Ciutat Esportiva Joan Gamper; Referee: Alfonso Oliva Bueno |

| 15 January 2012 17 | Sporting de Huelva | 0–3 | Barcelona | Huelva |
| | | Report | Olga García 26'; Sonia 51', 56' | Stadium: La Orden; Referee: Rodríguez Varela |

| 22 January 2012 18 | UD Collerense | 1–4 | Barcelona | Palma |
| | Mascaró 24' | Report | Vicky Losada 7'; Olga García 11'; Marta Corredera 73'; Sonia 86' | Stadium: Camp Municipal Coll d'en Rebassa; Referee: Alberto Lara Ortega |

| 29 January 2012 19 | Barcelona | 3–0 | Sant Gabriel | Sant Joan Despí |
| | Sonia 65'; Alba Mena 75' (o.g.); Carol 89' | Report | | Stadium: Ciutat Esportiva Joan Gamper; Referee: Abraham Martínez Sáez |

| 5 February 2012 20 | Rayo Vallecano | 3–2 | Barcelona | Madrid |
| | Jade 12'; Chini 30'; Jenni 59' | Report | Vicky Losada 2'; Sonia 26' | Stadium: Ciudad Deportiva Fundación Rayo Vallecano; Referee: Carlos Dionisio Ortiz Blanco |

| 19 February 2012 21 | Barcelona | 3–2 | Levante | Sant Joan Despí |
| | Vicky Losada 59'; Carol 67'; Olga García 83' | Report | Alexia 23'; Andrea 46' | Stadium: Ciutat Esportiva Joan Gamper; Referee: Congost Larrosa |

| 26 February 2012 22 | SD Lagunak | 0–2 | Barcelona | Barañáin |
| | | Report | Vicky Losada 30', 80' | Stadium: Servicio Municipal Lagunak; Referee: Prieto Iglesias |

| 4 March 2012 23 | Barcelona | 6–2 | FVPR El Olivo | Sant Joan Despí |
| | Sonia 17', 76', 87'; Vicky Losada 27', 80'; Carol 75' | Report | Lombi 46'; Lu 91' | Stadium: Ciutat Esportiva Joan Gamper; Referee: Juan Manuel Martín Varas |

| 11 March 2012 24 | Barcelona | 4–0 | Atlético Madrid | Sant Joan Despí |
| | Marta Corredera 20'; Meli 23'; Sonia 37'; Vicky Losada 45' | Report | | Stadium: Ciutat Esportiva Joan Gamper; Referee: Albert Ávalos Martos |

| 18 March 2012 25 | Málaga | 0–3 | Barcelona | Málaga |
| | | Report | Carol 67'; Olga García 69'; Vicky Losada 74' | Stadium: Camp Municipal José Gallardo; Referee: Gómez Arias |

| 25 March 2012 26 | Barcelona | 5–1 | Zaragoza CFF | Sant Joan Despí |
| | Míriam 4', 34'; Sonia 47'; Ani 71'; Olga García 78' | Report | Mariela 64' | Stadium: Ciutat Esportiva Joan Gamper; Referee: Pérez Bueno |

| 8 April 2012 27 | SP Comarca Llanos Olivenza | 0–4 | Barcelona | Olivença |
| | | Report | Ani 30'; Sonia 37'; Carol 50'; Olga García 69' | Stadium: Ciudad Deportiva Extremadura; Referee: Manuel Olivera Vázquez |

| 15 April 2012 28 | Barcelona | 1–0 | L'Estartit | Sant Joan Despí |
| | Míriam 52' | Report | | Stadium: Ciutat Esportiva Joan Gamper; Referee: Llopart Carbó |

| 22 April 2012 29 | Valencia | 0–2 | Barcelona | Valencia |
| | | Report | Míriam 24'; Sonia 42' | Stadium: Beniferri; Referee: Mena Gimeno |

| 29 April 2012 30 | Barcelona | 2–0 | Real Sociedad | Sant Joan Despí |
| | Sonia 21'; Vicky Losada 84' | Report | | Stadium: Ciutat Esportiva Joan Gamper; Referee: Juan Rodríguez Pontoles |

| 4 May 2012 31 | Athletic Club | 3–1 | Barcelona | Bilbao |
| | Gurutze 1' (pen.); Nekane 36'; Ani 92' (o.g.) | Report | Míriam 27' | Stadium: Lezama Facilities; Referee: Ortega Espejo-Saavedra |

| 11 May 2012 32 | Barcelona | 6–0 | RCD Espanyol | Sant Joan Despí |
| | Sonia 1', 28' (pen.), 32'; Carol 39'; Marta Corredera 54', 73' | Report | | Stadium: Ciutat Esportiva Joan Gamper; Referee: David Medié Jiménez |

| 20 May 2012 33 | Reocín | 0–7 | Barcelona | Reocín |
| | | Report | Vicky Losada 9'; Luli 32'; Olga García 53', 62', 75'; Sonia 78'; Leila 86' | Stadium: Pepín Cadelo; Referee: Cumplido Pardo |

| 27 May 2012 34 | Barcelona | 1–0 | Sporting de Huelva | Sant Joan Despí |
| | Marta Corredera 46' | Report | | Stadium: Ciutat Esportiva Joan Gamper; Referee: Raúl Calle Martínez |

=== Copa de la Reina ===
| 8 June 2012 Semifinals | Barcelona | 0–2 | Athletic Club | Las Rozas |
| | | Report | 0-1 Gurutze 37', 0-2 Flaviano 72' | Stadium: La Ciudad del Fútbol; Referee: Beatriz Gil Gozalo |

=== Copa Catalunya ===
==== 2011 ====
| 27 August 2011 Semifinals | Barcelona | 2–1 | L'Estartit | Sant Joan Despí |
| | Montse Tomé 69'; Sonia Bermúdez 73' | Report | Maribel | Stadium: Municipal Les Planes |

| 28 August 2011 Final | Barcelona | 1–0 | Espanyol | Sant Adrià de Besòs |
| | Alba 74' (o.g.) | Report | | Stadium: Ciutat Esportiva Dani Jarque |

==== 2012 ====
Barcelona's quarterfinal match of the 2012 Copa Catalunya, played in June 2012, is considered part of this season.

| 21 June 2012 Quarterfinals | CF Lloret | 2–8 | Barcelona | Lloret de Mar |
| | | Report |
