= List of Valencia CF Femenino seasons =

This is a list of seasons played by Valencia CF Femenino, the women's section of Spanish football club Valencia CF, and its predecessor DSV Colegio Alemán. The team was created in its original form in 1998, and has represented Valencia CF since the 2009–10 season.

== Summary ==
Champions	Runners-up	Promoted	Relegated

Domestic and international results of DSV Colegio Alemán
Season	League										Cup	Europe	League top scorers					
Season	Tier	Division	Pos	P	W	D	L	F	A	Pts	Cup	Europe	1st	Goal	2nd	Goal	3rd	Goal
2004–05	2	Primera Nacional	7th	24	11	2	11	55	33	35			?					
2005–06	2	Primera Nacional	?										?					
2006–07	2	Primera Nacional	1st	26	22	2	2	96	15	68			?					
2007–08	1	Superliga	13th	26	6	4	16	36	59	22			?					
2008–09	1	Superliga	14th	30	8	1	21	39	81	25			?					

Domestic and international results of Valencia CF Femenino
Season	League										Cup	Europe	League top scorers					
Season	Tier	Division	Pos	P	W	D	L	F	A	Pts	Cup	Europe	1st	Goal	2nd	Goal	3rd	Goal
2009–10	1	Superliga	17th	24	7	4	13	52	55	25			?					
2010–11	1	Superliga	10th	28	17	2	9	67	52	53	R16		?					
2011–12	1	Primera División	13th	34	10	1	23	37	83	31			?					
2012–13	1	Primera División	13th	30	9	3	18	29	52	30			(Spain) Mateos	9	(Spain) Amo	5	(Spain) Ves ^{N}	4
2013–14	1	Primera División	6th	30	15	6	9	45	27	51	QF		(Spain) Vilas	17	(Spain) Monforte ^{N}	6	(Spain) Carreras	6
2014–15	1	Primera División	4th	30	17	8	5	58	25	59	RU		(Spain) Vilas	20	(Spain) Férez	14	(Spain) Monforte ^{N}	5
2015–16	1	Primera División	6th	30	15	4	11	65	30	49	SF		(Spain) Vilas	19	(Spain) Nicart ^{N}	7	(Spain) Férez ^{N}	7
2016–17	1	Primera División	3rd	30	20	8	2	69	11	68	SF		(Spain) Vilas	28	(Spain) Peiró	8	(Chile) Aedo	7
2017–18	1	Primera División	5th	30	14	8	8	49	32	50	QF		(Spain) Vilas	19	(Argentina) Szymanowski	7	(Spain) Peiró	6
2018–19	1	Primera División	8th	30	8	11	11	41	53	35	Round of 16		(Spain) Vilas	14	(Namibia) Coleman	7	(Spain) Férez	6
2019–20	1	Primera División	15th	21	3	8	10	21	28	17	Round of 16		(Spain) Vilas	8	(Namibia) Coleman^{N}	4	(Spain) Férez^{N}	4
2020–21	1	Primera División	9th	34	11	11	12	51	60	44			(Netherlands) Jansen	11	(Spain) Andújar	9	(Spain) Bautista	4
2021–22	1	Primera División	14th	30	7	6	17	27	56	27	Round of 16		(Venezuela) Altuve	6	(Spain) Andújar^{N}	5	(Spain) Carro^{N}	5
2022–23	1	Liga F	9th	30	11	4	15	36	55	37	Third round		(Spain) Marcos	9	(Spain) Pujadas^{N}	4	(Spain) Carro^{N}	4
2023–24	1	Liga F	12th	30	8	7	15	35	64	29	Round of 16		(Spain) Marcos	11	(Colombia) Chacón	6	(Spain) Pauleta	3
2024–25	1	Liga F	16th	30	5	8	17	24	47	23	Third round		(Spain) Martí	6	(Morocco) Mrabet	4	(Spain) Carro	3
2025–26	2	Primera Federación	3rd	26	12	10	4	35	18	46	Third round		(Puerto Rico) Marcano	7	(Spain) Mascarell	4	(Andorra) Morató	4
