= 2012 Copa Catalunya (women's football) =

The 2012 Copa Catalunya Femenina was the eighth edition of the competition and ran from 26 May to 27 August 2012, with the Final Four taking place in Manresa. FC Barcelona defeated RCD Espanyol on penalties in the final to win its fourth title in a row. UE L'Estartit and CE Sant Gabriel also reached the Final Four.

== Results ==
=== First round ===
The matches were played on 26 and 27 May 2012.

Team 1	Score	Team 2
Porqueres	5–0	Bellavista Milan
Lloret	1–1 (?–? p)	Unificació Prat
Santpedor	0–4	Atlètic Vilafranca
AEM Lleida	3–2	Lleida Esportiu
Cabanes	2–1	La Salle Premià
Escola Valls	6–1	Sant Andreu
Júpiter	5–2	Xaica
Guineueta	4–4 (5–4 p)	Igualada
EF Bonaire	1–1 (?–? p)	Cerdanyola

=== Second round ===
The matches were played on 2 and 3 June 2012.

Team 1	Score	Team 2
Porqueres	3–0	Sant Cugat
Lloret	3–0	Suburense
Riupederes	3–1	Atlètic Vilafranca
AEM Lleida	Walkover	Llevant Les Planes
Cabanes	0–1	Pardinyes
Escola Valls	1–1 (4–1 p)	Europa
Júpiter	3–0^{1}	Badalona
Guineueta	3–1	Bonaire

^{1} This game was originally won by Badalona (2–7) before it was awarded a default victory in favor of Júpiter.

=== Third round ===
The matches were played on 9, 10 and 16 June 2012.

Team 1	Score	Team 2
Porqueres	3–5	Lloret
Riupederes	1–3	AEM Lleida
Pardinyes	1–3	Escola Valls
Júpiter	1–1 (5–4 p)	Guineueta

=== Quarter-finals ===
The matches were played on 16, 21 and 23 June 2012.

Team 1	Score	Team 2
Lloret	2–8	Barcelona
AEM Lleida	2–8	L'Estartit
Escola Valls	1–4	Espanyol
Júpiter	0–13	Sant Gabriel

=== Semifinals ===
August 24, 2012
19:00 (CEST)

Espanyol	2 – 0	Sant Gabriel
García 27'; Gimbert 60' (pen.)

Nou Congost, Manresa
Referee: Petrova

August 24, 2012
21:00 (CEST)

FC Barcelona	8 – 0	L'Estartit
Férez 21', 67'; Bermúdez 44', 75', 89'; Nicolau 49'; Aznar 57'; García 79'

Nou Congost, Manresa
Referee: Bernat

=== Final ===
August 27, 2012
18:45 (CEST)

Barcelona	1 – 1	Espanyol
García 46'		Vilas 5'
Penalties
Bermúdez (penalty missed); Gómez (penalty scored); Unzué (penalty scored); Gutiérrez (penalty missed); García (penalty scored); Diéguez (penalty scored); Escribano (penalty scored); Gili (penalty scored); Nicolau (penalty scored); Férez (penalty scored)	8–7	(penalty missed) Gimbert; (penalty scored) Vilanova; (penalty scored) Monforte; (penalty missed) Torrejón; (penalty scored) Mendoza; (penalty scored) Meseguer; (penalty scored) Vilas; (penalty scored) Pereira; (penalty scored) Montagut; (penalty missed) Pomares

Nou Congost, Manresa
Referee: Zardaín
