= Florencia Quiñones =

Argentine football player and manager

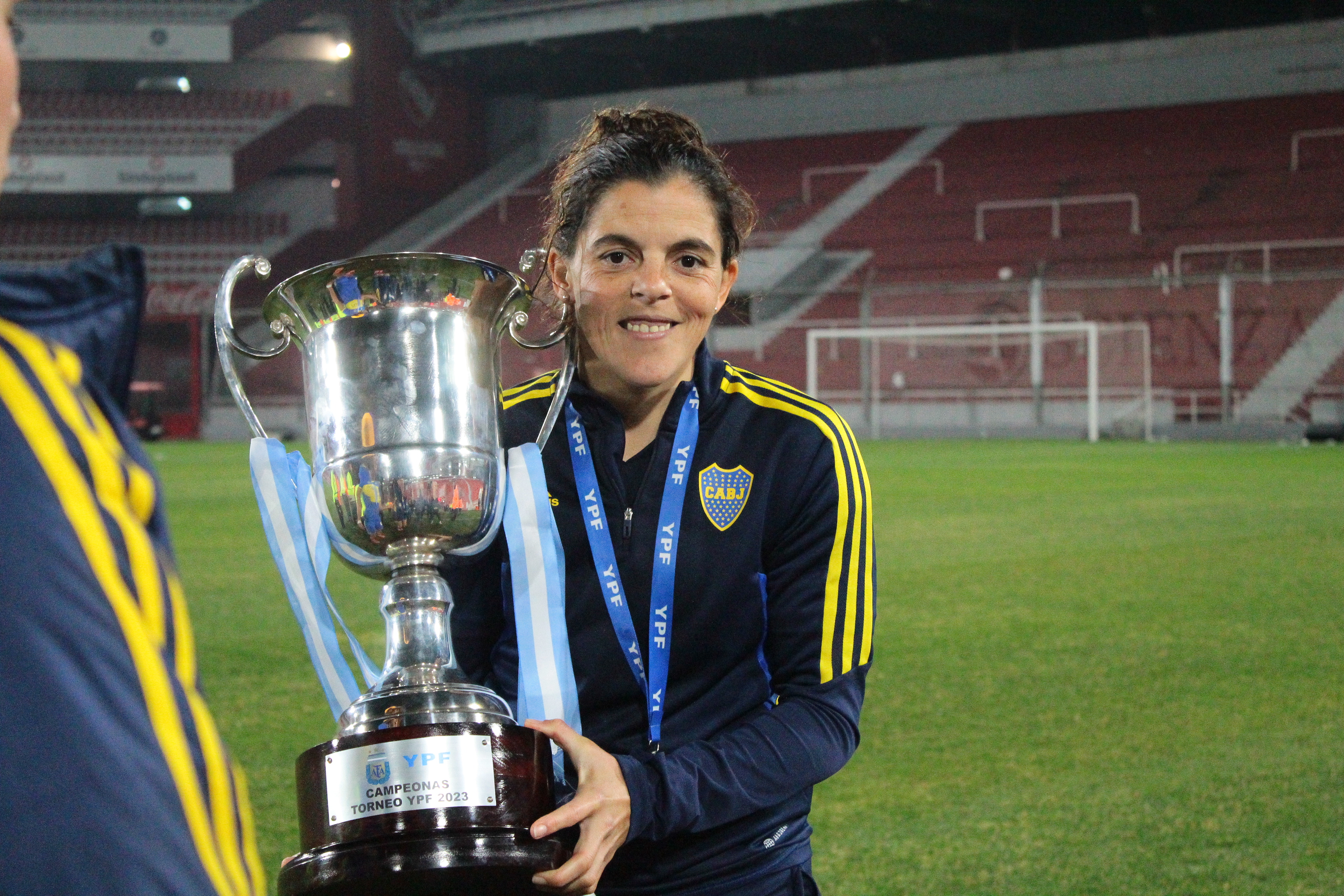
- Quiñones winning her first title as a manager

Personal information
- Full name: María Florencia Quiñones
- Date of birth: 26 August 1986 (age 40)
- Place of birth: Oncativo, Córdoba, Argentina
- Height: 1.56 m (5 ft 1 in)
- Position: Midfielder

Senior career*
Years	Team	Apps	(Gls)
2005–2011	San Lorenzo		
2011–2013	FC Barcelona		
2013–2017	San Lorenzo		
2017–2021	Boca Juniors		
- Pacífico (futsal)
2022–	Boca Juniors (futsal)		

International career
- Argentina

Managerial career
- 2021–2023: Argentina women U20 (assistant)
- 2021–2023: Argentina women U17 (assistant)
- 2021–2023: Argentina women U15 (assistant)
- 2023–: Boca Juniors women
Medal record
Women's football
Representing Argentina
South American Games
Gold medal – first place	2014 Santiago	Team
- * Club domestic league appearances and goals

María Florencia Quiñones (born 26 August 1986) is an Argentine football manager and former player and current futsal player who coaches Boca Juniors in the Campeonato de Fútbol Femenino. She played as a midfielder.

== Club career ==
Quiñones has played for FC Barcelona in Spain's Primera División.

== International career ==
Quiñones defended Argentina, such as at the 2007 World Cup and the 2008 Summer Olympics.

== Honours ==
=== Player ===
San Lorenzo

- Primera División A: 2008 Apertura, 2015

FC Barcelona

- Liga F: 2011–12, 2012–13
- Copa de la Reina: 2013
- Copa Catalunya: 2011, 2012

Boca Juniors

- Primera División A: 2020, 2021 Clausura
- Súper Final: 2021

Pacífico (futsal)

- Copa Argentina de Futsal Femenino: 2017

Argentina

- South American Games: 2014

=== Manager ===
Boca Juniors

- Primera División A: 2023
- Copa de la Liga: 2023
- Copa Federal: 2023
