= 2017 Copa de la Reina de Fútbol =

Tournament details
- Country: Spain
- Teams: 8

Final positions
- Champions: Barcelona (5th title)
- Runners-up: Atlético de Madrid

Tournament statistics
- Matches played: 7
- Goals scored: 25 (3.57 per match)
- Top goal scorer(s): Mari Paz Vilas; Sonia Bermúdez (3 goals each)

Awards
- Best player: Jennifer Hermoso

The 2017 Copa de la Reina de Fútbol was the 35th edition of the Spanish women's football national cup. It ran from 4 to 18 June 2017.

Barcelona defeated Atlético de Madrid in the final for their fifth cup win.

== Qualification ==
Location of the 2017 Copa de la Reina teams
Canary Islands location of the 2017 Copa de la Reina teams

Top eight positions of the 2016-17 Spanish First Division (provisional).

#	Team	Pld	W	D	L	GF	GA	GD	Pt	2016
1	Atlético de Madrid	30	24	6	0	91	17	+75	78	▲2
2	Barcelona	30	24	3	3	98	13	+85	75	Same position
3	Valencia	30	20	8	2	69	11	+58	71	▲3
4	Levante	30	18	3	8	53	49	+4	57	Same position
5	Athletic Club	30	16	5	9	64	44	+20	53	▼4
6	Granadilla	30	13	7	10	53	41	+12	46	▲1
7	Rayo Vallecano	30	13	1	15	49	53	-4	43	▲3
8	Real Sociedad	30	12	6	12	44	34	+10	42	▼3
9	Santa Teresa	30	10	6	14	28	46	-18	36	▲2
10	Sporting de Huelva	30	9	8	13	47	56	-9	35	▼2

=== Qualified teams by community ===
Autonomous community	Team/s
(Basque Country (autonomous community)) Basque Country	Athletic Club; Real Sociedad
Canary Islands	Granadilla
Catalonia	Barcelona
Community of Madrid	Atlético de Madrid; Rayo Vallecano
Valencian Community	Valencia; Levante

== Results ==
=== Bracket ===
Quarterfinals
2	Barcelona (a.e.t.)	1
8	Real Sociedad	0
5	Athletic Club	1
3	Valencia	3
1	Atlético de Madrid (a.e.t.)	4
7	Rayo Vallecano	3
6	Granadilla	2
4	Levante	1

Semifinals
Barcelona	2
Valencia	1
Atlético de Madrid	2
Granadilla	0

Final
Barcelona	4
Atlético de Madrid	1

2017 Copa de la Reina de Fútbol Champion
(Catalonia) Barcelona
(5th title)

=== Quarterfinals ===
3 June 2017
10:00

Barcelona	1–0 (a.e.t.)	Real Sociedad
Latorre 102'	Report FC Barcelona Report Real Sociedad

Estadio Matapiñonera, San Sebastián de los Reyes
Referee: (Community of Madrid) Elena Contreras Patiño
3 June 2017
12:30

Athletic Club	1–3	Valencia
Corres 11'	Report Athletic Club Report Valencia	Banini 10'; Vilas 56', 67'

Estadio Matapiñonera, San Sebastián de los Reyes
Referee: (Canary Islands) Marta Huerta de Aza
4 June 2017
10:00

Atlético de Madrid	4–3 (a.e.t.)	Rayo Vallecano
Borja 40'; Bermúdez 88', 96'; Sampedro 119'		L. Domínguez 49'; Pablos 55', 94'

Estadio Matapiñonera, San Sebastián de los Reyes
Referee: (Region of Murcia) María Dolores Martínez Madrona
4 June 2017
12:30

Granadilla	2–1	Levante
García 18'; Martí 82'		Pérez 32' (pen.)

Estadio Matapiñonera, San Sebastián de los Reyes
Referee: (Community of Madrid) Lobenschus Kinga-Hajnalka

=== Semifinals ===
16 June 2017
17:00

Barcelona	2–1	Valencia
Gili 21'; Losada 28'		Vilas 90+4'

La Ciudad del Fútbol, Las Rozas
Referee: (Community of Madrid) Miguel Ángel Ortiz Arias
16 June 2017
19:30

Atlético de Madrid	2–0	Granadilla
Borja 15' del Valle 26' (o.g.)

La Ciudad del Fútbol, Las Rozas
Referee: (Castile and León) Alfonso Vicente Moral

=== Final ===
18 June 2017
11:30

Barcelona	4–1	Atlético de Madrid
Hermoso 41', 49'; Putellas 70'; Bonmatí 83'		Bermúdez 58'

La Ciudad del Fútbol, Las Rozas
Referee: (Extremadura) Francisco José Hernández Maeso

Barcelona	Atlético Madrid

GK	13	(Spain) Sandra Paños
DF	4	(Spain) Marta Unzué
DF	18	(Spain) Marta Torrejón
DF	3	(Spain) Ruth García
DF	15	(Spain) Leila Ouahabi	(substituted off) 66'
MF	16	(Spain) Vicky Losada
MF	12	(Spain) Patri Guijarro
MF	7	(Spain) Gemma Gili	(substituted off) 66'
MF	11	(Spain) Alexia Putellas
FW	9	(Spain) Mariona Caldentey	(substituted off) 90'
FW	10	(Spain) Jennifer Hermoso	(substituted off) 90'
Substitutes:
GK	1	(Spain) Laura Ràfols
FW	5	(Spain) Melanie Serrano	(substituted on) 66'
DF	6	(Denmark) Line Røddik
FW	17	(Spain) Irene del Río
FW	19	(Spain) Bárbara Latorre	(substituted on) 90'
FW	20	(Spain) Olga García	(substituted on) 90'
MF	24	(Spain) Aitana Bonmatí	(substituted on) 66'
Manager:
(Spain) Xavi Llorens

GK	1	(Spain) Lola Gallardo
DF	2	(Mexico) Kenti Robles	(substituted off) 59'
DF	19	(Spain) Andrea Pereira
DF	16	(Spain) Mapi León
DF	18	(Spain) Carmen Menayo
MF	15	(Spain) Silvia Meseguer
MF	10	(Spain) Amanda Sampedro
MF	11	(Spain) Priscila Borja	(substituted off) 90'
MF	3	(Spain) Beatriz Beltrán	(substituted off) 46'
FW	8	(Spain) Sonia Bermúdez
FW	9	(Spain) Esther González	(substituted off) 81'
Substitutes:
GK	13	(Romania) Andreea Părăluță
FW	4	(Spain) Marta Cazalla	(substituted on) 81'
DF	7	(Spain) Ángela Sosa	(substituted on) 46'
FW	12	(Spain) María Bores
DF	14	(Spain) Alexandra López	(substituted on) 59'
FW	23	(Spain) Anita	(substituted on) 90'
MF	20	(Spain) Pilar García
Manager:
(Spain) Ángel Villacampa

=== Goalscorers ===
3 goals:

- Mari Paz Vilas (Valencia)
- Sonia Bermúdez (Atlético de Madrid)

2 goals:

- Natalia Pablos (Rayo Vallecano)
- Priscila Borja (Atlético de Madrid)
- Jennifer Hermoso (Barcelona)

1 goal:

- Yulema Corres (Athletic Club)
- Laura Domínguez (Rayo Vallecano)
- María José Pérez (Levante)
- Estefanía Banini (Valencia)
- Cindy García (Granadilla)
- María Martí (Granadilla)
- Aitana Bonmatí (Barcelona)
- Gemma Gili (Barcelona)
- Bárbara Latorre (Barcelona)
- Victoria Losada (Barcelona)
- Alexia Putellas (Barcelona)
- Amanda Sampedro (Atlético de Madrid)

Own goal

- María Estella del Valle (playing against Atlético de Madrid)
