= 2011 Copa de la Reina de Fútbol =

Tournament details
- Country: Spain
- Teams: 14

Final positions
- Champions: Barcelona (2nd title)
- Runners-up: Espanyol

Tournament statistics
- Matches played: 21
- Goals scored: 58 (2.76 per match)
- Top goal scorer(s): Cristina Baudet; Olga García (4 goals each)

The 2011 Copa de la Reina was the 29th edition of the competition. It comprised two double-leg stages and a final four that took place in La Ciudad del Fútbol in Las Rozas de Madrid. It was won by FC Barcelona, their second title.

== Qualified teams ==
Pos	Club	Pld	W	D	L	GF	GA	Pts
1	Espanyol	14	10	2	2	42	14	32
2	Rayo Vallecano	14	9	3	2	41	20	30
3	Athletic Club	14	9	1	4	32	15	28
4	Barcelona	14	5	4	5	13	13	19
5	Atlético de Madrid	14	5	2	7	17	24	17
6	Prainsa Zaragoza	14	2	2	9	20	31	11
7	Sant Gabriel	14	2	4	8	19	48	10
8	Real Sociedad	14	2	4	8	9	28	10

Pos	Club	Pld	W	D	L	GF	GA	Pts
1	Valencia	14	9	2	3	38	22	29
2	Sporting de Huelva	14	8	2	4	36	20	26
3	Reocín Racing	14	7	4	3	26	23	25

Pos	Club	Pld	W	D	L	GF	GA	Pts
1	Levante	14	9	2	1	29	7	29
2	Collerense	14	7	2	3	22	13	23
3	Lagunak	14	7	2	3	15	11	23

== Results ==
=== First round ===
Team 1	Agg.	Team 2	1st leg	2nd leg
Barcelona	7–1	Reocín Racing	4–1	3–0
Real Sociedad	2–2	Valencia	1–0	1–2
Sant Gabriel	3–2	Levante	3–2	1–1
Atlético de Madrid	4–1	Collerense	1–0	3–1
Prainsa Zaragoza	(w/o)	Sporting de Huelva	–	–
Athletic Club	11–1	Lagunak	6–0	5–1

=== Quarter-finals ===
Team 1	Agg.	Team 2	1st leg	2nd leg
Barcelona	4–1	Rayo Vallecano	2–0	2–1
Real Sociedad	4–3	Sant Gabriel	3–1	1–2
Atlético de Madrid	3–1	Prainsa Zaragoza	1–0	2–1
Espanyol	5–1	Athletic Club	3–1	2–0

15 May 2011

Barcelona	2–0	Rayo Vallecano
García 10'; Corredera 15'

Ciutat Esportiva Joan Gamper, Barcelona
15 May 2011

Real Sociedad	3–1	Sant Gabriel
Agoues 29', 46'; Lucas 48'		Herrero 1' (o.g.)

Instalaciones de Zubieta, Zubieta

22 May 2011

Rayo Vallecano	1–2	Barcelona
Bermúdez 65'		García 4', 11'

Ciudad Deportiva Fundación Rayo Vallecano, Madrid
22 May 2011

Sant Gabriel	2–1	Real Sociedad
Villagrasa 51'; Baudet 86'		Zelaia 64'

Campo Municipal José Luis Ruiz Casado, Sant Adrià de Besòs

=== Final Four ===
Semifinals
Team 1	Result	Team 2
Barcelona	2–0	Real Sociedad
Espanyol	1–0	Atlético de Madrid

Final
Team 1	Result	Team 2
Barcelona	1–0	Espanyol

==== Semi-final ====
17 June 2011
18:00

Barcelona	2–0	Real Sociedad
Corredera 51'; Rubio 77'

La Ciudad del Fútbol, Las Rozas de Madrid

17 June 2011
20:30

Espanyol	1–0	Atlético de Madrid
Romero 19'

La Ciudad del Fútbol, Las Rozas de Madrid
Referee: Raúl Sánchez Mateos

==== Final ====
19 June 2011
11:00

Barcelona	1–0	Espanyol
García 108'

La Ciudad del Fútbol, Las Rozas de Madrid
Attendance: 1,000
Referee: Valentín Pizarro

Barcelona	Espanyol

GK	(Spain) Laura Ràfols
DF	(Spain) Lau Gómez
DF	(Spain) Meli Nicolau
DF	(Spain) Ani Escribano
DF	(Spain) Melanie Serrano		(substituted off) 89'
MF	(Spain) Marta Unzué
MF	(Spain) Marta Corredera
MF	(Spain) Montserrat Tomé		(substituted off) 63'
MF	(Spain) Noemí Rubio		(substituted off) 77'
MF	(Spain) Vicky Losada	(yellow card) 100'	(substituted off) 110'
FW	(Spain) Olga García
Substitutes:
DF	(Spain) Rocío López		(substituted in) 89'
DF	(Spain) Carol Férez		(substituted in) 63'
FW	(Spain) Laura Gutiérrez		(substituted in) 77'
FW	(Spain) Esther Romero		(substituted in) 110'
Manager:
(Spain) Xavi Llorens

GK	1	(Spain) Mariajo
DF	2	(Spain) Ane Bergara
DF	5	(Spain) Marta Torrejón	(yellow card) 26'
DF	8	(Portugal) Sónia Matias		(substituted off) 92'
DF	9	(Spain) Sandra Vilanova		(substituted off) 68'
MF	10	(Spain) Vanesa Gimbert
MF	15	(Spain) Silvia Meseguer		(substituted off) 110'
MF	11	(Spain) Sara Monforte
FW	7	(Spain) Willy
FW	18	(Spain) Alexia Putellas		(substituted off) 101'
MF	19	(Spain) Erika Vázquez
Substitutes:
DF	6	(Spain) Lara Rabal		(substituted in) 92'
MF	24	(Spain) Andrea Pereira		(substituted in) 68'
DF	25	(Spain) Núria Mendoza		(substituted in) 110'
MF		(Spain) Débora García		(substituted in) 101'
Manager:
(Spain) Òscar Aja

Copa de la Reina 2011 Winners
Barcelona
2nd Title
