= Olga García =

Spanish footballer

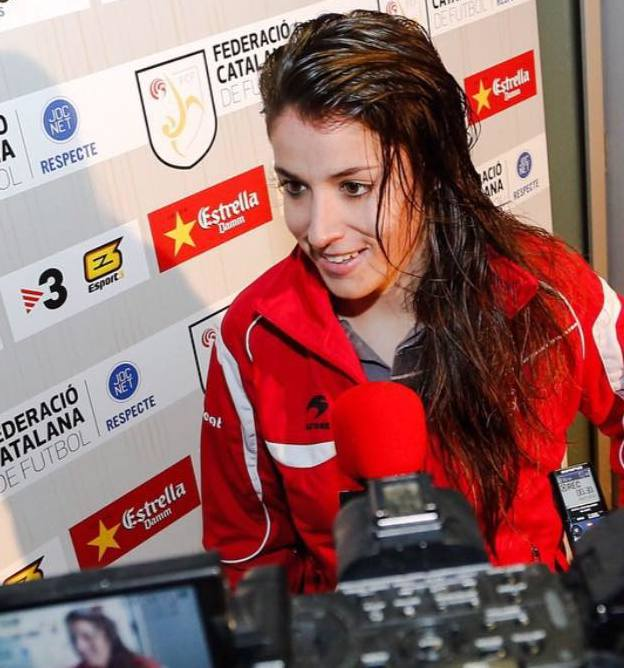

Personal information
- Full name: Olga García Pérez
- Date of birth: 1 June 1992 (age 34)
- Place of birth: Dosrius, Catalonia, Spain
- Height: 1.74 m (5 ft 8 1/2 in)
- Position: Forward

Team information
- Current team: Logroño
- Number: 11

Youth career
- 2001–2002: La Penya Blac i Brava La Roca
- 2002–2004: FC Mataró
- 2004–2010: Barcelona

Senior career*
Years	Team	Apps	(Gls)
2010–2013	Barcelona	87	(53)
2013–2015	Levante	60	(17)
2015–2018	Barcelona	70	(22)
2018–2020	Atlético Madrid	41	(12)
2020–2024	Logroño	11	(2)

International career
2010–2011	Spain U-19	9	(5)
2015–2019	Spain	32	(5)
2014–2019	Catalonia	3	(3)
- * Club domestic league appearances and goals as of 25 October 2021

Olga García Pérez (born 1 June 1992) is a Spanish footballer who plays as a forward for Primera División club EdF Logroño and the Spain women's national team.

== Club career ==
As a young girl, Olga played for clubs La Penya Blac i Brava La Roca and FC Mataró before arriving at the youth teams of FC Barcelona in 2004 when she was about 12 years old. She was promoted to the club's first team at the 2010–11 season and at her first season she became the club's top scorer with 25 goals, including the winning goal of the 2011 Copa de la Reina de Fútbol final. On her second season (2011–2012), she was the club's second top goalscorer with 22 goals, winning the Primera División. On the 2012–2013 season she was again the club's second top scorer with 13 league goals, playing with the club at the 2013 Champions League and winning the Copa de la Reina and the Primera División.

In June 2013 she signed a two-year contract with Levante UD.

She moved back to FC Barcelona after two seasons at Levante, signing a contract with the club in July 2015.

== International career ==
Garcia played for Spain on the under-17 and under-19 team. She was part of team which competed at the 2011 UEFA Women's Under-19 Championship.

She trained and has been involved with the senior national team since the 2012–2013 season. Her match debut happened on 26 November 2015, coming on as a substitute during Spain's UEFA Women's Euro 2017 qualifying 3–0 win against Republic of Ireland in Dublin. At the end of that match, she had a shot deflected off Sophie Perry which resulted on Spain's third goal.

== Career statistics ==
=== International goals ===
Olga García – goals for Spain
#	Date	Venue	Opponent	Score	Result	Competition
1.	1 March 2017	Bela Vista Municipal Stadium, Prchal	Japan	0–2	1–2	2017 Algarve Cup
2.	3 March 2017	Estádio Algarve, Faro/Loulé	Norway	3–0	3–0	2017 Algarve Cup
3.	30 June 2017	Pinatar Arena, San Pedro del Pinatar	Belgium	6–0	7–0	Friendly
4.	28 February 2018	GSZ Stadium, Larnaca	Austria	0–1	0–2	2018 Cyprus Cup
5.	6 April 2018	Telia 5G -areena, Helsinki	Finland	0–2	0–2	2019 FIFA Women's World Cup qualification

Olga García – goals for Catalonia
#	Date	Venue	Opponent	Score	Result	Competition
1.	27 December 2014	Lasesarre, Barakaldo	(Basque Country (autonomous community)) Basque Country	0–1	1–1	Friendly
2.	22 December 2016	A Lomba, Vilagarcia de Arousa	(Galicia (Spain)) Galicia	0–3	0–5	Friendly
3.	22 December 2016	A Lomba, Vilagarcia de Arousa	(Galicia (Spain)) Galicia	0–4	0–5	Friendly

== Honours ==
Barcelona

- Primera División: Winner 2011–12, 2012–13
- Copa de la Reina: Winner 2011, 2013, 2017, 2018
- Copa Catalunya: Winner 2011, 2012, 2015, 2016, 2017

Spain

- Algarve Cup: Winner 2017
- Cyprus Cup: Winner 2018
