= Esther Sullastres =

Spanish footballer (born 1993)

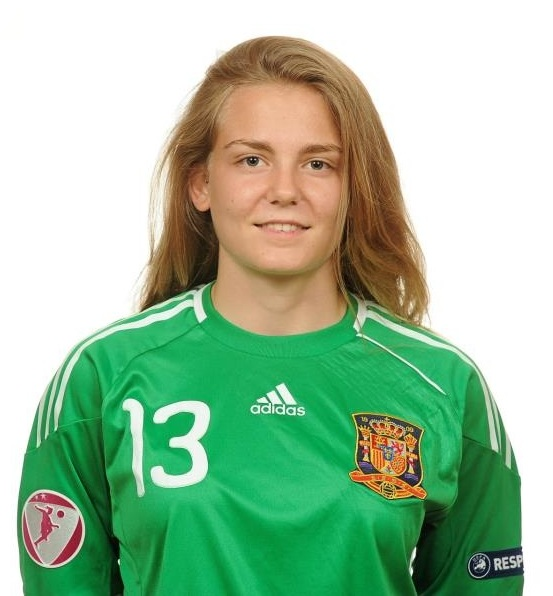
- Sullastres at the 2012 UEFA Women's Under-19 Championship Finals

Personal information
- Full name: Esther Sullastres Ayuso
- Date of birth: 20 March 1993 (age 33)
- Place of birth: Torroella de Montgrí, Spain
- Height: 1.74 m (5 ft 8 1/2 in)
- Position: Goalkeeper

Team information
- Current team: Sevilla
- Number: 1

Youth career
- 2001–2008: L'Estartit

Senior career*
Years	Team	Apps	(Gls)
2001–2012	L'Estartit	200	(24)
2012–2013	Barcelona	10	(0)
2013–2015	Transportes Alcaine	46	(0)
2015–2017	Valencia	42	(0)
2017–2019	Zaragoza CFF	11	(?)
2019–2021	Deportivo La Coruña	34	(0)
2021–	Sevilla	98	(0)

International career^{‡}
2010	Spain U17	3	(0)
2011–2012	Spain U19	11	(0)
2016–	Catalonia	3	(0)
2017–2025	Spain	1	(0)
Medal record
Women's football
Representing Spain
UEFA Women's Championship
Runner-up	2025 Switzerland
- * Club domestic league appearances and goals as of 19:10, 28 July 2025 (UTC) ‡ National team caps and goals as of 19:10, 28 July 2025 (UTC)

Esther Sullastres Ayuso (Spanish pronunciation: [esˈteɾ suˈʎastɾes aˈʝuso]; born 20 March 1993) is a Spanish professional footballer who plays as a goalkeeper for Primera División club Sevilla and the Spain national team.

Before joining Barcelona in the 2012–13 season, Sullastres played for UE L'Estartit. She has been on the under-17 and under-19 Spanish national youth teams.

== Club career ==
=== Early career ===
Sullastres was born in Torroella de Montgrí, Girona, Catalonia, and she started her career with UE L'Estartit's youth team in July 2001. She played on youth teams that won several tournaments, and a league championship in the 2007–08 season, with only 7 goals scored against.

Sullastres joined the senior team at a young age, and with her good performances, became a first-string player.

By the end of the Superliga that, Estartit had obtained great results (they ended up in first place in the "second" minileague) and qualified for the Copa de la Reina, though they were disqualified in the first leg, against UD Levante.

L'Estartit wanted to stand out in a competitive league. However, under the economic stress of traveling expenses and facing veteran teams with greater financial resources, the club was relegated to the second division after five years in Primera División.

=== Barcelona ===
Sullastres first joined Barcelona in July 2012. The team gave her an opportunity after the relegation with L'Estartit.

She participated in half of the games Barcelona played. Her first appearance took place in Manresa against her former team L'Estartit in the semifinals of the Copa Catalunya, with a result of 8–0, and a few days later Barcelona won the Queen's Cup after defeating RCD Espanyol in the finals.

At the beginning of the 2012–13 season, they lost the first two games to Espanyol and Rayo Vallecano, but went on to win every other game and to again won the championship, in the last game against Athletic Club.

==== 2012 Women's Champions League ====
FC Barcelona's league title in the 2011–12 season permitted the girls to play in this Champions League in the following months. After the draw they knew their rival was Arsenal Ladies FC. The first leg took place in Mini Estadi in Barcelona. Sullastres was the first-string goalkeeper, but the match was a 0–3 loss. In the second leg in London, the Arsenal ladies won again, 4–0. Sullastres did not play this time.

== International career ==
Sullastres participated in the second qualifying round of the Women's Under-17 European Championship, which took place in Las Rozas de Madrid, in 2010, where she first appeared as an international player, in the third match of the championship, playing eleven minutes against Switzerland, in a match whose result was a draw (0–0). With that result, the team scored seven points, out of nine possible, and ended up qualifying for the final round to be played in Nyon, Switzerland. Sullastres, though, did not play. The team won the European Cup.

For the next two years Sullastres was a part of the Under-19 team, and, finally, in the 2011–12 season, she was chosen to participate in the three phases of the European Championship.

Sullastres was chosen to play in the first phase. The first round was played in Sarajevo, Bosnia and Herzegovina, in September, 2011. It consisted of three matches: The first one against the host team, Bosnia and Herzegovina, with a positive result (9–0); the second one was against Moldova, with another victory (8–0); and the last one, against Switzerland (currently classified in the Women's Under-20 World's cup) also a victory of 3–0. Sullastres played the full game against Moldova. With 9 points, 0 allowed goals and 20 scored goals, the Spanish girls were a part of the best team of the first qualifying round.

Qualifying for the second round in Sochi, Russia, the team trained hard until then. The matches were, in order: Spain – Italy, with a victory of 4–0, played in Sputnik-Sport stadium; Spain – Russia, another 4–0 victory for Spain; and against Scotland with a result of 2–3 for Spain, this time played in Centralni Stadium. Russia's weather caused some problems in that month of April, 2012. Some matches were suspended because of the hard and cold rain. Sullastres played only 17 minutes of the Russian match. Although this time the Spanish team allowed two goals, they continued to be the best team of the championship. Knowing that several traditionally powerful teams were not in the final round in Antalya, Turkey, Vilda's players held onto their hopes for defending the cup for one more year.

The final round resulted in the girls getting the silver medal. A good 3–0 start against Serbia in World of Wonders Football Centre stadium, and an amazing 4–0 against England in Titanic stadium let the team get into the semifinals. Sullastres played 4 minutes against England. They seemed to play their third match against Sweden as an obligatory draw (0–0). This game was played in Mardan Sport Complex stadium (Field 2).

After much struggling in the semifinal against Portugal, Spain won (1–0), which put the girls got into the final for the third consecutive time. Goals did not want to come in the final against Sweden, and the match ended up a 0–0 draw at the end of regular play. Spain lost in overtime (0–1) in the 108th minute. The Spanish players protested to the referee for not having validated a goal. However, with the silver medal, Sullastres was at a high-level in her sport, a good ending to the last year of her youth career.

On 10 June 2025, Sullastres was called up to the Spain squad for the UEFA Women's Euro 2025.

== Honours ==
Barcelona

- Primera División: 2012–13
- Copa de la Reina: 2013

Spain

- UEFA Women's Championship runner-up: 2025
- Algarve Cup: 2017
