= 2018 Copa de la Reina de Fútbol =

Tournament details
- Country: Spain
- Teams: 8

Final positions
- Champions: Barcelona (6th title)
- Runners-up: Atlético de Madrid

Tournament statistics
- Matches played: 11
- Goals scored: 25 (2.27 per match)
- Top goal scorer(s): Lucía García (3 goals)

Awards
- Best player: Andrea Pereira

The 2018 Copa de la Reina de Fútbol was the 36th edition of the Spanish women's association football national cup. It took place from 19 May to 3 June 2018. Barcelona won the competition by defeating Atlético de Madrid in the final.

== Qualification ==
Location of the 2017 Copa de la Reina teams
Canary Islands location of the 2017 Copa de la Reina teams

Top eight positions of the 2017-18 Spanish First Division

#	Team	Pld	W	D	L	GF	GA	GD	Pt	2016
1	Atlético de Madrid	30	24	5	1	74	21	+53	77	Same position
2	Barcelona	30	24	4	2	98	12	+86	76	Same position
3	Athletic Club	30	18	2	10	51	41	+10	56	▲2
4	Granadilla	30	16	6	8	48	33	+15	54	▲2
5	Valencia	30	14	8	8	49	32	+17	50	▼2
6	Betis	30	14	4	12	40	37	+3	46	▲5
7	Real Sociedad	30	10	8	12	42	37	+5	38	▲1
8	Levante	30	11	5	14	49	50	-1	38	▼4
9	Sporting de Huelva	30	11	5	14	35	42	-7	38	▲1
10	Madrid CFF	30	10	6	14	34	56	-22	36	(N)

=== Qualified teams by community ===
Autonomous community	Team/s
Andalusia	Betis
(Basque Country (autonomous community)) Basque Country	Athletic Club; Real Sociedad
Canary Islands	Granadilla
Catalonia	Barcelona
Community of Madrid	Atlético de Madrid
Valencian Community	Valencia; Levante

== Results ==
=== Bracket ===
Quarterfinals
7	Real Sociedad	1	1	2
3	Athletic Club	2	2	4
2	Barcelona	1	1	2
8	Levante	0	0	0
6	Betis	0	1	1
4	Granadilla	1	2	3
1	Atlético de Madrid	2	2	4
5	Valencia	1	1	2

Semifinals
Athletic Club	2 (3)
Barcelona	2 (4)
Granadilla	0
Atlético de Madrid	2

Final
Barcelona	1
Atlético de Madrid	0

2018 Copa de la Reina de Fútbol Champion
(Catalonia) Barcelona
(6th title)

=== Quarterfinals ===
==== First leg ====
19 May 2018	Real Sociedad	1–2	Athletic Club	San Sebastián
16:00	Lareo 88'		Gimbert 18'; Egurrola 36'	Stadium: Zubieta; Referee: (Community of Madrid) Elena Contreras

19 May 2018	Atlético de Madrid	2–1	Valencia	Majadahonda
20:45	Corredera 57'; Sampedro 62'		Peiró 37'	Stadium: Estadio Cerro del Espino; Referee: (Galicia (Spain)) Elena Casal

20 May 2018	Betis	0–1	Granadilla	Seville
12:00			A. González 79'	Stadium: Luis del Sol; Referee: (Region of Murcia) Elia María Martínez

20 May 2018	Barcelona	1–0	Levante	Sant Joan Despí
16:00	Putellas 53'			Stadium: Joan Gamper; Referee: (Andalusia) María José Villegas

==== Second leg ====
22 May 2018	Valencia	1–2 (2–4 agg.)	Atlético de Madrid	Majadahonda
20:45	Szymanowski 90+4'		Sampedro 9'; Falcón 90+3'	Stadium: Estadio Cerro del Espino; Referee: (Catalonia) Ainara Andrea Acevedo

23 May 2018	Levante	0–1 (0–2 agg.)	Barcelona	Buñol
17:00			Putellas 82'	Stadium: Ciudad Deportiva de Buñol; Referee: (Castile and León) Elena Peláez

23 May 2018	Athletic Club	2–1 (4–2 agg.)	Real Sociedad	Bilbao
19:00	L. García 28', 90'		Nahikari G. 31'	Stadium: Lezama; Referee: (Catalonia) Ylenia Sánchez

23 May 2018	Granadilla	2–1 (3–1 agg.)	Betis	Granadilla de Abona
21:00	Sara Tui 9'; Gavira 90+3'		Paula Moreno 62'	Stadium: La Palmera; Referee: (Aragon) Paola Cebollada

=== Semifinals ===
26 May 2018	Granadilla	0–2	Atlético de Madrid	Reus
12:00			Ludmila 90'; Sosa 90+3'	Stadium: Municipal; Referee: (Region of Murcia) María Dolores Martínez

26 May 2018	Athletic Club	2–2 (a.e.t.) (3–4 p)	Barcelona	Reus
16:00	Arraiza 83'; L. García 95'		Caldentey 36'; Martens 94'	Stadium: Municipal; Referee: (Aragon) Marta Frías
	Penalties
	Gimbert (penalty scored); Vázquez (penalty scored); Murua (penalty scored); Arraiza (penalty missed); L. García (penalty missed)		(penalty scored) Andanova; (penalty scored) Losada; (penalty missed) Duggan; (penalty scored) Guijarro; (penalty scored) Andressa

=== Final ===
2 June 2018
20:30

Barcelona	1–0 (a.e.t.)	Atlético de Madrid
Caldentey 120+2'

Estadio Romano, Mérida
Attendance: 13,600
Referee: Marta Huerta de Aza

Barcelona	Atlético Madrid

GK	13	(Spain) Sandra Paños
DF	12	(Spain) Patri Guijarro
DF	5	(Spain) Melanie Serrano		(substituted off) 114'
DF	14	(Spain) Mapi León
DF	7	(Spain) Gemma Gili		(substituted off) 76'
MF	11	(Spain) Alexia Putellas		(substituted off) 71'
MF	6	(Spain) Vicky Losada
MF	20	(France) Élise Bussaglia
FW	9	(Spain) Mariona Caldentey
FW	22	(Netherlands) Lieke Martens
FW	16	(England) Toni Duggan		(substituted off) 63'
Substitutes:
GK	1	(Spain) Laura Ràfols
DF	3	(Spain) Ruth García
MF	4	(Spain) Marta Unzué		(substituted on) 76'
FW	17	(Brazil) Andressa Alves	(yellow card) 83'	(substituted on) 63'
FW	21	(North Macedonia) Nataša Andonova		(substituted on) 114'
FW	19	(Spain) Bárbara Latorre
MF	24	(Spain) Aitana Bonmatí		(substituted on) 71'
Manager:
(Spain) Fran Sánchez

GK	1	(Spain) Lola Gallardo
DF	11	(Spain) Carmen Menayo
DF	14	(Spain) Marta Corredera
DF	2	(Mexico) Kenti Robles	(substituted off) 118'
DF	4	(Spain) Andrea Pereira
MF	10	(Spain) Amanda Sampedro
MF	7	(Spain) Ángela Sosa
MF	6	(France) Aurélie Kaci
MF	15	(Spain) Silvia Meseguer
FW	8	(Spain) Sonia Bermúdez	(substituted off) 114'
FW	3	(Brazil) Ludmila da Silva	(substituted off) 99'
Substitutes:
GK	13	(Romania) Andreea Părăluță
DF	5	(Spain) Marta Cazalla
FW	9	(Spain) Esther González	(substituted on) 114'
DF	16	(Brazil) Jucinara	(substituted on) 118'
FW	17	(Spain) Laura Fernández
FW	19	(Spain) Carla Bautista
MF	21	(Spain) Andrea Falcón	(substituted on) 99'
Manager:
(Spain) Ángel Villacampa

=== Goalscorers ===
3 goals:

- Lucía García (Athletic Club)

2 goals:

- Mariona Caldentey (Barcelona)
- Alexia Putellas (Barcelona)
- Amanda Sampedro (Atlético de Madrid)

1 goal:

- Eunate Arraiza (Athletic Club)
- Damaris Egurrola (Athletic Club)
- Vanesa Gimbert (Athletic Club)
- Marta Corredera (Atlético de Madrid)
- Andra Falcón (Atlético de Madrid)
- Ludmila da Silva (Atlético de Madrid)
- Ángela Sosa (Atlético de Madrid)
- Lieke Martens (Barcelona)
- Patricia Gavira (Granadilla)
- Anita González (Granadilla)
- Sara Tui (Granadilla)
- Nahikari García (Real Sociedad)
- Manuela Lareo (Real Sociedad)
- Marta Peiró (Valencia)
- Marianela Szymanowski (Valencia)
