= Gemma Gili =

Spanish footballer (born 1994)

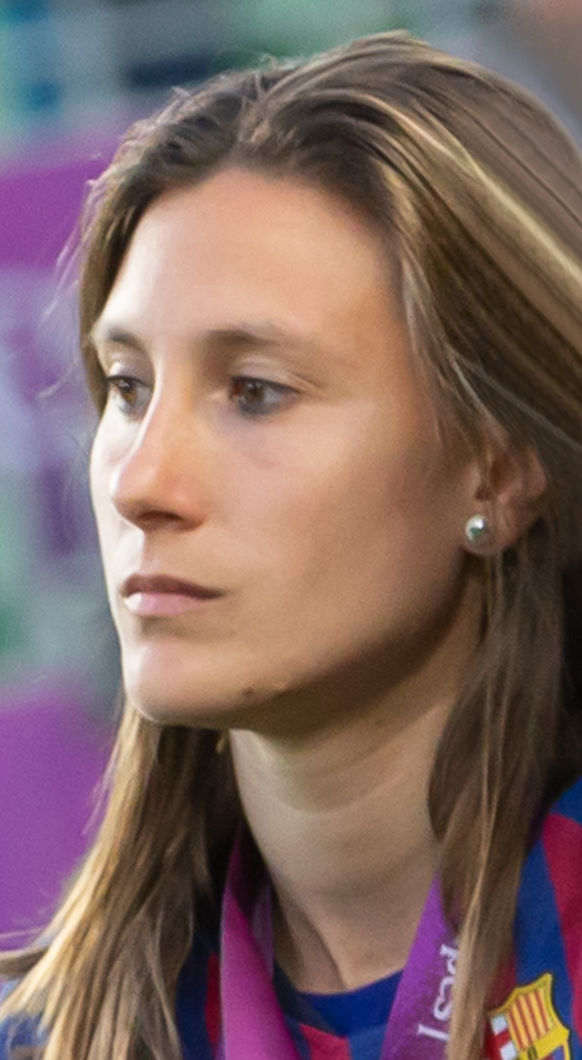
- Gili with Barcelona in 2019

Personal information
- Full name: Gemma Gili Giner
- Date of birth: 21 May 1994 (age 32)
- Place of birth: Castellón, Spain
- Height: 1.66 m (5 ft 5 in)
- Position: Midfielder

Team information
- Current team: Sevilla FC
- Number: 21

Senior career*
Years	Team	Apps	(Gls)
2008–2012	Valencia	71+	(9+)
2012–2019	Barcelona	134	(11)
2019–2020	Levante	20	(4)
2020–2023	Real Sociedad	73	(4)
2023–	Sevilla FC	30	(5)

International career
2009–2011	Spain U17	21	(5)
2011–2013	Spain U19	15	(3)
2017–	Spain	3	(1)
- * Club domestic league appearances and goals as of 25 October 2021

Gemma Gili Giner (born 21 May 1994) is a Spanish footballer who plays as a midfielder for Primera División club Sevilla FC. She previously played for Barcelona, in the UEFA Women's Champions League.

As a junior international Gili won the 2010 and 2011 U-17 European Championships, assisting Alba Pomares in the 2011 final's overtime winner. She scored one goal in the 2010 U-17 World Cup against New Zealand.

On 2 July 2023, Sevilla FC announced the Gili had signed with the club for the 2023–24 Liga F season. On 24 June 2024, Gili announced that she had signed a contract extension for another year at the club.

== International goals ==
No.	Date	Venue	Opponent	Score	Result	Competition
1.	20 January 2018	Pinatar Arena, San Pedro del Pinatar, Spain	Netherlands	2–0	2–0	Friendly

== Honours ==
=== Club ===
Barcelona

- Primera División (3): 2012–13, 2013–14, 2014–15
- Copa de la Reina (4): 2012–13, 2013–14, 2016–17, 2017–18

=== International ===
Spain

- Cyprus Cup: Winner, 2018
