= Prchal =

Prchal (feminine: Prchalová) is a Czech surname. It may refer to:

- Bolek Prchal, Czech actor
- Eduard Prchal (1911–1984), Czech pilot
- Josef Prchal (1925–1989), Czech Communist politician
- Radim Prchal, Czech hockey player and referee

== See also ==
- Prchala
