= José Luis Ruiz Casado =

Spanish politician (1958–2000)

José Luis Ruiz Casado (Barcelona, 1958 – San Adrián del Besós, 2000) was a Spanish politician for Partido Popular who was killed by ETA.

== Biography ==
José Luis Ruiz Casado was killed by ETA in San Adrian del Besós on 2 September 2000. He worked in private industry at the same time he was councillor of Partido Popular in San Adrián del Besós since 1995. He was married and had two sons. At the time of his murder, he was 42 years old.

=== Murder ===
In March 2000, José Ignacio Krutxaga Elezkano and Fernando García Jodrá moved from France to Barcelona to form the Gaztelugatxe command, which would act in the province of Barcelona. They settled in a rented apartment in Barcelona. In July, Lierni Armendáriz González de Langarika joined the brigade. The ETA's members identified the Councillor of Partido Popular in the Town Hall of Sant Adrià de Besòs by the media, and later they located his home using the phone book.

After subjecting him to monitoring and surveillance, they knew his habits and decided to kill him outside his house. On 21 September 2000, around 7:40 am, the Councillor came out of his house and went to his vehicle to go to the Town Hall. It was an instant later when Fernando García Jodrá, who awaited along with José Ignacio Krutxaga, shot him from the front, a meter and a half away, reaching his face. At that moment, José Luis was lying on the ground, and Garcia Jodra shot him twice in the face. He died immediately.

By the death of José Luis Ruiz Casado, the Central Court of Instruction n ° 5 of the National Court opened Summary No. 21/00. By order of 13 July 2001, José Ignacio Krutxaga Elezkano and Lierni Armendáriz González de Langarika were processed by terrorist offences of murder, motor vehicle theft, damage, and falsehood in an official document. By order of 4 February 2002, Fernando García Jodrá was processed for the same offences. The summary was concluded by order of 26 June 2002, and raised on 2 July following Section 4 of the Criminal Chamber being attached to Room Roll No. 15/00. The Fourth Section of the Criminal Chamber of the National Court decided by order of 3 November 2002, the opening of an oral trial against the three defendants.

The oral hearing took place on 12 and 13 March 2003. The Fourth Section of the Criminal Chamber of the National Court issued on 18 March 2003, Sentence No. 10/2003. José Ignacio Krutxaga Elezkano, Lierni Armendáriz González de Langarika and Fernando García Jodrá were sentenced to 34 1/2 years in prison. They were condemned to 30 years for a crime of terrorist homicide with the burden of treachery, 2 years for a crime of motor vehicle theft and 2 years and a half for a crime of forgery of an official document. After this attack, there was no particular claim by the terrorist group ETA.

== Bibliography ==
- MERINO, A., CHAPA, A., Raíces de Libertad. pp. 209–217. FPEV (2011). ISBN 978-84-615-0648-4 (in spanish)
- This article makes use of material translated from the corresponding article in the Spanish-language Wikipedia.
