= Marta Corredera =

Spanish footballer (born 1991)

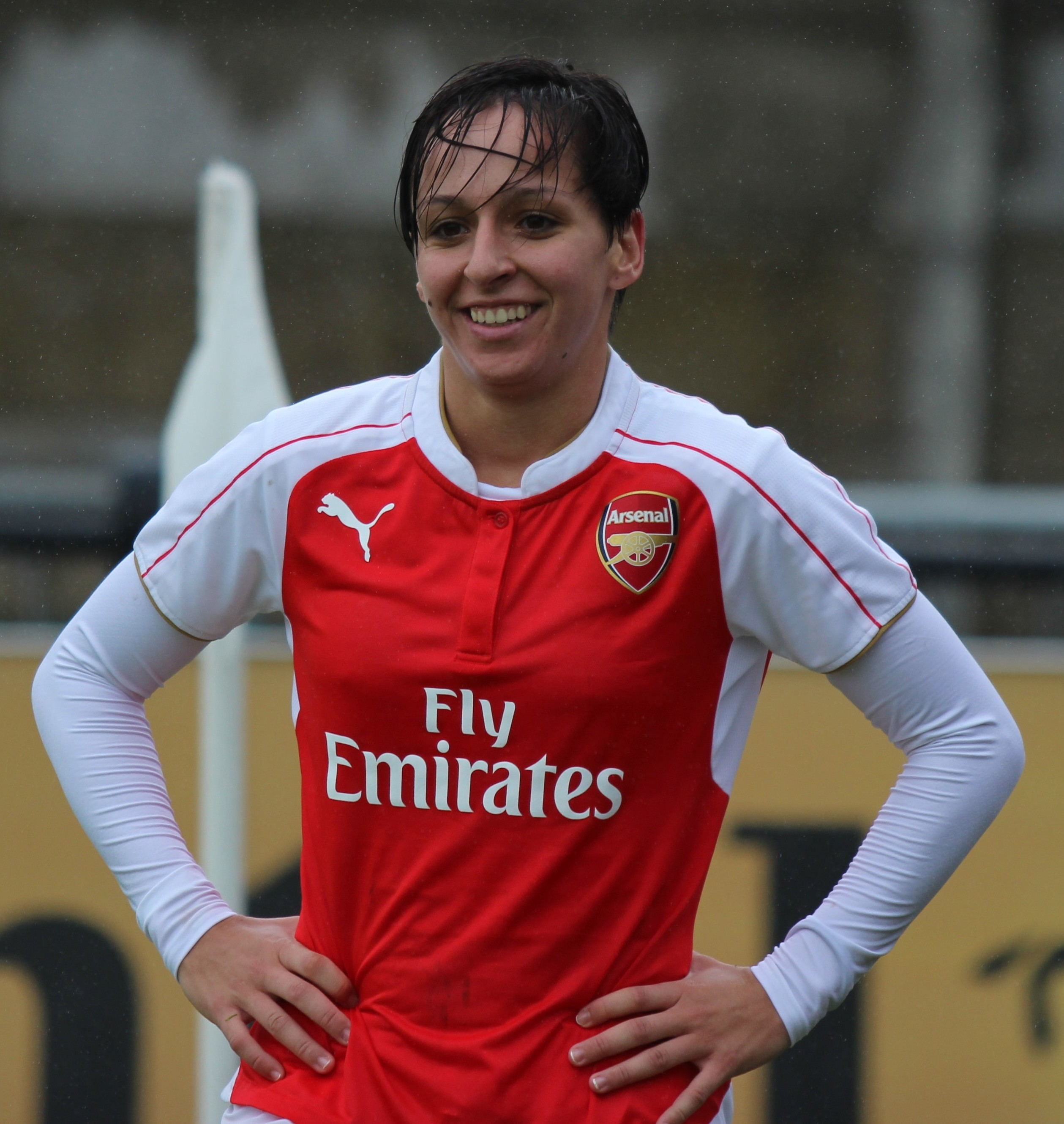
- Corredera playing for Arsenal in 2015

Personal information
- Full name: Marta Corredera Rueda
- Date of birth: 8 August 1991 (age 35)
- Place of birth: Terrassa, Spain
- Height: 1.62 m (5 ft 4 in)
- Positions: Winger; right wing-back

Youth career
- 2002-2006: Sabadell

Senior career*
Years	Team	Apps	(Gls)
2006-2010	Espanyol	67	(10)
2010–2015	Barcelona	146	(41)
2015–2016	Arsenal	19	(0)
2016–2018	Atlético de Madrid	50	(10)
2018–2020	Levante	38	(2)
2020–2023	Real Madrid	36	(2)

International career^{‡}
2011–2021	Spain	85	(5)
2014–2017	Catalonia	3	(1)
- * Club domestic league appearances and goals as of 14 November 2021 ‡ National team caps and goals as of 24 September 2021

Marta Corredera Rueda (born 8 August 1991) is a Spanish professional footballer who plays as a winger or right wing-back. She is currently a free agent.

Rueda formerly represented FC Barcelona, Arsenal Ladies of the English FA WSL, Atlético de Madrid and Levante. She is a member of the Spain women's national football team and was part of the squad at the 2015 FIFA Women's World Cup in Canada as well as the 2019 FIFA Women's World Cup in France.

== Club career ==
Corredera signed for Arsenal in July 2015, from Barcelona where she had won four consecutive Primera División titles since 2011. With the Gunners, Corredera won the 2015 WSL Cup and the 2016 FA Women's Cup. In October 2016, Corredera and her compatriots Natalia Pablos and Vicky Losada all left Arsenal. She agreed to a transfer to Atlético de Madrid where she won the 2017 league title.

== International career ==
On 20 May 2019, Corredera was called up to the Spain squad for the 2019 FIFA Women's World Cup.

== Career statistics ==
Scores and results list Spain's and Catalonia's goal tally first, score column indicates score after each Corredera goal.

List of international goals scored by Marta Corredera
No.	Date	Venue	Opponent	Score	Result	Competition
Spain goals
1	17 September 2011	Recep Tayyip Erdoğan Stadium, Istanbul, Turkey	Turkey	9–1	10–1	UEFA Women's Euro 2013 qualifying
2	27 November 2013	Estadio Fernando Torres, Fuenlabrada, Spain	Czech Republic	3–0	3–2	2015 Women's World Cup qualification
3	15 September 2016	La Ciudad del Fútbol, Las Rozas, Spain	Montenegro	7–0	13–0	UEFA Women's Euro 2017 qualifying
4	31 August 2018	El Sardinero, Santander, Spain	Finland	1–0	5–1	2019 Women's World Cup qualification
5	31 August 2018	El Sardinero, Santander, Spain	Finland	3–1	5–1	2019 Women's World Cup qualification
Catalonia goals
1	26 December 2015	Mini Estadi, Barcelona, Spain	(Basque Country (autonomous community)) Basque Country	1–1	1–1	Friendly

== Honours ==
Espanyol

- Copa de la Reina de Fútbol: 2009, 2010

Barcelona

- Primera División: 2011–12, 2012–13, 2013–14, 2014–15
- Copa de la Reina de Fútbol: 2011, 2013, 2014

Arsenal

- FA Women's Cup: 2015–16
- FA WSL Cup: 2015

Atletico Madrid

- Primera División: 2016–17, 2017–18

Spain

- Algarve Cup: 2017
- Cyprus Cup: 2018

Individual

- Catalan Female Player of the Year: 2014
- Spanish Female Player of the Year: 2015
