= Carolina Férez =

Spanish footballer (born 1991)

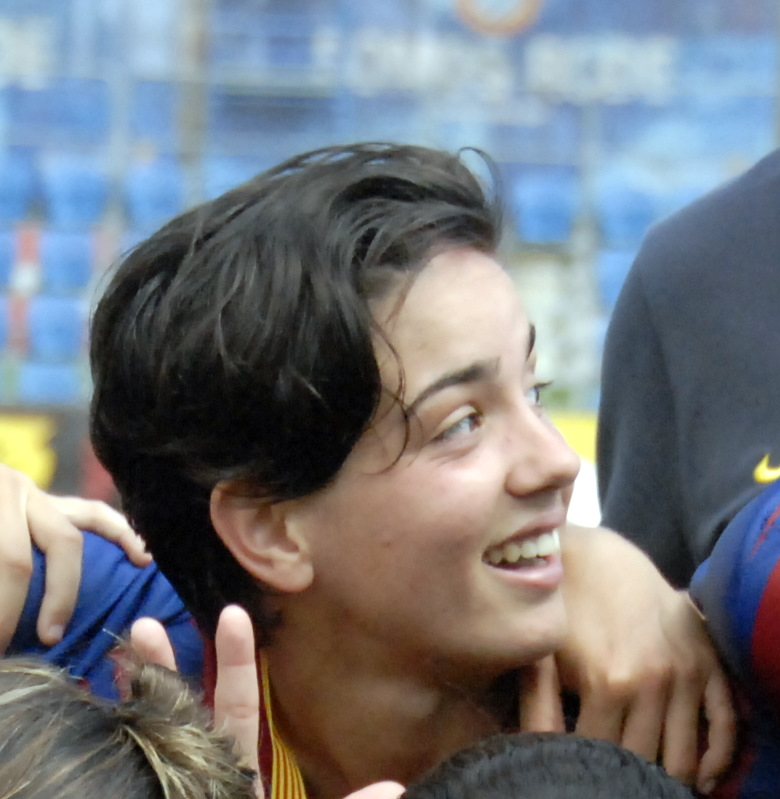
- Férez with Barcelona in 2011

Personal information
- Full name: Carolina Férez Méndez
- Date of birth: 26 June 1991 (age 35)
- Place of birth: Sabadell, Catalonia, Spain
- Height: 1.63 m (5 ft 4 in)
- Position: Second striker

Team information
- Current team: Real Betis
- Number: 14

Youth career
- Barcelona

Senior career*
Years	Team	Apps	(Gls)
2007–2009	Espanyol		
2009–2014	Barcelona	103	(23)
2014–2020	Valencia	139	(33)
2020–2023	Levante	13	(2)
2023–	Real Betis		

International career
2008–2010	Spain U19		
2015	Spain	2	(0)
2014–2019	Catalonia	5	(3)
- * Club domestic league appearances and goals as of 25 October 2021

Carolina Férez Méndez (born 26 June 1991), commonly known as Carol, is a Spanish footballer who plays as a forward for Real Betis. She previously played for Espanyol and Barcelona.

== Honours ==
- Primera División (3): 2011–12, 2012–13, 2013–14
- Copa de la Reina de Fútbol (4): 2009, 2011, 2013, 2014
- Copa Catalunya (6): 2007, 2008, 2009, 2010, 2011, 2012
