= 2013 Copa de la Reina de Fútbol =

Tournament details
- Country: Spain
- Teams: 8

Final positions
- Champions: Barcelona
- Runners-up: Prainsa Zaragoza

Tournament statistics
- Matches played: 13
- Goals scored: 30 (2.31 per match)
- Top goal scorer(s): Sonia Bermúdez (5 goals)

The 2013 Copa de la Reina de Fútbol was the 31st edition of the Spanish women's football national cup. It ran from 12 May to 16 June 2013 and was contested by the best eight teams in the 2012–13 Spanish Championship, four more teams than in the previous edition. Both the quarterfinals and the semifinals were two-legged ties, instead of the final four held in the headquarters of the RFEF in the three previous editions.

== Qualification ==
Location of the 2012-13 Copa de la Reina teams

Top eight positions of the 2012-13 Spanish First Division.

#	Team	Pld	W	D	L	GF	GA	Pt	2012
1	Barcelona	30	24	4	2	91	13	76	Same position
2	Athletic Club	30	23	5	2	84	24	74	Same position
3	Atlético de Madrid	30	20	8	2	70	21	68	▲3
4	Levante	30	21	2	7	53	21	65	▲1
5	Espanyol	30	16	6	8	47	25	54	▼2
6	Rayo Vallecano	30	14	7	9	81	48	49	▼2
7	Prainsa Zaragoza	30	14	3	13	65	77	45	▲2
8	Sant Gabriel	30	11	7	12	40	44	40	▲2
9	Sporting de Huelva	30	11	5	14	41	52	38	▼1
10	Real Sociedad	30	9	6	15	41	44	33	▼3

=== Qualified teams by community ===
Autonomous community	Team/s
(Catalonia) Catalunya	Barcelona, Espanyol, Sant Gabriel
(Basque Country (autonomous community)) Euskadi	Athletic Club
(Community of Madrid) Madrid	Atlético de Madrid, Rayo Vallecano
(Valencian Community) Valencia	Levante

== Results ==
=== Bracket ===
Quarterfinals
1	Atlético de Madrid	1	1	2
8	Athletic Club	0	1	1
4	Rayo Vallecano	0	0	0
5	Barcelona (aet)	0	2	2
2	Sant Gabriel	3	1	4
7	Prainsa Zaragoza (a)	3	1	4
3	Espanyol	1	1	2
6	Levante	1	2	3

Semifinals
Atlético de Madrid	0	1	1
Barcelona	3	2	5
Prainsa Zaragoza (a)	0	1	1
Levante	0	1	1

Final
Barcelona	4
Prainsa Zaragoza	0

2013 Copa de la Reina de Fútbol Champion
(Catalonia) FC Barcelona
Second title

=== Quarterfinals ===
==== 1st leg ====
12 May 2013
11:00 (CEST)

Sant Gabriel	3 – 3	Prainsa Zaragoza
Carreras 12'; Villagrasa 41'; Serrano 65'	Report	Neto 62'; Coronel 75'; Mallada 82'

José Luis López Casado, Sant Adrià de Besós
12 May 2013
12:00 (CEST)

Espanyol	1 – 1	Levante
Gimbert 90' (pen.)	Report	Martínez 45'

CE Sant Adrià, Sant Adrià de Besós
Referee: Pertegal Méndez
12 May 2013
12:00 (CEST)

Rayo Vallecano	0 – 0	Barcelona
	Report

Fundación Rayo Vallecano, Madrid
Referee: Sánchez Seco
12 May 2013
13:30 (CEST)

Atlético de Madrid	1 – 0	Athletic Club
Zornoza 45'	Report

Cerro del Espino, Majadahonda
Referee: Pizarro Gómez

==== 2nd leg ====
18 May 2013
17:00 (CEST)

Levante	2 – 1	Espanyol
González 37'; Casado 43'	Report	Gimbert 16'

Nazaret, Valencia
Referee: Ayza Gámez
19 May 2013
11:30 (CEST)

Athletic Club	1 – 1	Atlético de Madrid
Paredes 34'	Report	Carro 90'

Lezama, Bilbao
Referee: Azkuenaga Astorkiza
19 May 2013
12:00 (CEST)

Barcelona	2 – 0 (a.e.t.)	Rayo Vallecano
Diéguez 92'; García 94'	Report

Joan Gamper, Barcelona
Referee: Sales Font
19 May 2013
12:00 (CEST)

Prainsa Zaragoza	1 – 1	Sant Gabriel
León 55'	Report	Lilo 63'

Pedro Sancho, Zaragoza
Referee: Frías Acedo

=== Semifinals ===
==== 1st leg ====
26 May 2013
12:00 (CEST)

Atlético de Madrid	0 – 3	Barcelona
	Report	Bermúdez 25', 62' (pen.), 90'

Cerro del Espino, Majadahonda
Attendance: 1,300
Referee: Ortiz
26 May 2013
12:00 (CEST)

Prainsa Zaragoza	0 – 0	Levante
	Report

Pedro Sancho, Zaragoza
Attendance: 600
Referee: Sánchez López

==== 2nd leg ====
9 June 2013
12:15 (CEST)

Barcelona	2 – 1	Atlético de Madrid
Bermúdez 31'; Corredera 90+4'	Report	Amanda 17'

Joan Gamper, Barcelona
9 June 2013
12:00 (CEST)

Levante	1 – 1	Prainsa Zaragoza
Alicia 73'	Report	Coronel 89'

Nazaret, Valencia

=== Final ===
16 June 2013
11:00 (CEST)

Barcelona	4 – 0	Prainsa Zaragoza
Vicky Losada 26'; Bermúdez 39'; Putellas 41'; Coronel 80' (o.g.)	Report

Ciudad del Fútbol, Las Rozas
Attendance: 500
Referee: Beatriz Gil Gozalo

Barcelona	Zaragoza

GK	1	(Spain) Laura Ràfols
DF	2	(Spain) Laura Gómez		(substituted off) 51'
DF	4	(Spain) Meli
DF	6	(Spain) Marta Unzué		(substituted off) 58'
DF	5	(Spain) Melanie Serrano
MF	15	(Spain) Virginia Torrecilla		(substituted off) 58'
MF	8	(Spain) Míriam Diéguez
MF	14	(Spain) Vicky Losada	(yellow card) 33'
FW	11	(Spain) Alexia Putellas
FW	9	(Spain) Olga García		(substituted off) 51'
FW	10	(Spain) Sonia Bermúdez
Substitutes:
GK	13	(Spain) Esther Sullastres
MF	12	(Spain) Guti		(substituted on) 58'
FW	7	(Spain) Marta Corredera		(substituted on) 51'
DF	16	(Mexico) Kenti Robles		(substituted on) 51'
DF		(Spain) Leila Ouahabi
MF		(Spain) Gemma Gili		(substituted on) 58'
MF		(Spain) Zaira Flores
Manager:
(Spain) Xavi Llorens

GK	1	(Portugal) Jamila Marreiros		(substituted off) 80'
DF	17	(Spain) Sandra Bernal	Booked
DF	22	(Spain) Lara Mata		(substituted off) 71'
DF	4	(Spain) Noelia Tudela
DF	7	(Spain) Mapi León
MF	15	(Argentina) Mariela Coronel
MF	21	(Spain) Nelly Maestro		(substituted off) 46'
MF	6	(Portugal) Cláudia Neto
FW	10	(Spain) Nuria Mallada
FW	23	(Spain) Bárbara Latorre
FW	19	(Spain) Sara Sanaú		(substituted off) 58'
Substitutes:
DF	25	(Spain) Diana Millán		(substituted on) 80'
DF	3	(Spain) Marta Reyes
DF	5	(Spain) Pipa
MF	8	(Spain) Clara Martínez		(substituted on) 46'
MF	14	(Spain) Marta Cardona		(substituted on) 71'
DF	20	(Spain) Lucía Fuertes		(substituted on) 71'
FW	26	(Spain) Iris Arnas
Manager:
(Spain) Alberto Berna
