= Marta Unzué =

Spanish footballer (born 1988)

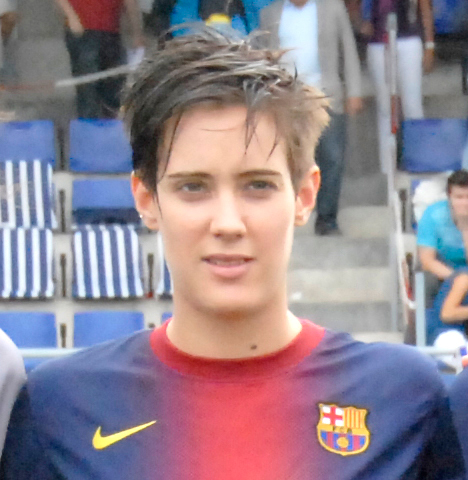
- Unzué in 2012

Personal information
- Full name: Marta Unzué Urdániz
- Date of birth: 4 July 1988 (age 38)
- Place of birth: Berriozar, Spain
- Height: 1.69 m (5 ft 7 in)
- Positions: Defensive midfielder; right-back

Senior career*
Years	Team	Apps	(Gls)
2003–2006	Osasuna		
2006–2020	Barcelona	278+	(21+)
2018–2020	→ Athletic Bilbao (loan)	39	(2)
2020–2025	Athletic Bilbao	74	(1)

International career
2014–	Basque Country	5	(0)
2017–	Navarre	1	(0)
- * Club domestic league appearances and goals

Marta Unzué Urdániz (born 4 July 1988) is a Spanish former professional footballer who played as a defensive midfielder and occasionally as a right-back.

She spent over a decade with Primera División (Liga F) club Barcelona, winning several trophies and featuring in the UEFA Women's Champions League; The latter years of her career were spent at Athletic Bilbao.

== Club career ==
Unzué arrived at FC Barcelona in 2006 from CA Osasuna, along with her twin sister Elba. The team performed poorly and were relegated in her first season. Elba left the club after four years, but Marta remained and was appointed captain after the departure of Vicky Losada in 2015. She maintained her role of first captain for two years.

On 24 July 2018, a deal was agreed for 30-year-old Unzué to join Athletic Bilbao on a two-year loan contract. At the end of her loan contract, in April 2020, she announced her departure from Barcelona to transfer permanently to Athletic. She left having recorded the second-most appearances of all time for Barcelona with 360. Subsequently she also became captain of the Bilbao club.

In July 2025, having not played for two years (Note: The BDFutbol website records Unzué as appearing in a fixture between Athletic and Barcelona in January 2025, but other sources confirm it was Maite Valero who took part.) due to injury (primarily a tear to the anterior cruciate ligament of her right knee in May 2023), Unzué announced her retirement.

== Education ==
Unzué obtained a degree in physical activity and sport science in 2010, and a master's degree in nutrition and food in 2014 from the University of Barcelona. She also has a Level 2 certificate in football coaching.

== Personal life ==
Unzue's uncle is Movistar Team general manager, Eusebio Unzué. Her other uncle, Juan Carlos Unzué played football for CA Osasuna, FC Barcelona and Sevilla FC as a goalkeeper.

== Honours ==
FC Barcelona

- Primera División: 2011–12, 2012–13, 2013–14, 2014–15
- Segunda División: 2007–08
- Copa de la Reina de Fútbol: 2011, 2013, 2014, 2017, 2018
- Copa Catalunya (8): 2009, 2010, 2011, 2012, 2014, 2015, 2016, 2017
