= Kenti Robles =

Mexican footballer (born 1991)

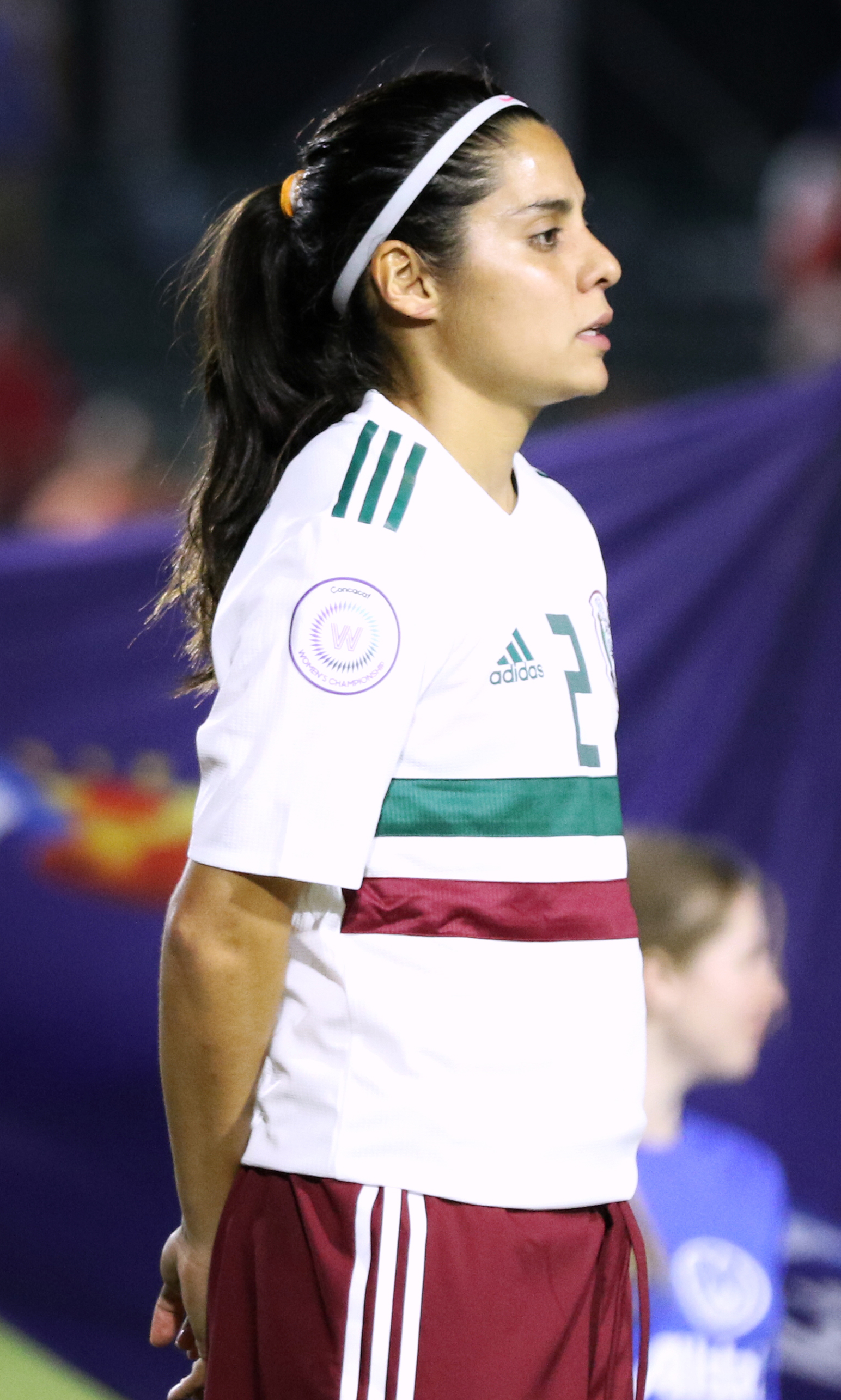
- Robles representing Mexico in 2018

Personal information
- Full name: Vaitiare Kenti Robles Salas
- Date of birth: 15 February 1991 (age 35)
- Place of birth: Mexico City, Mexico
- Height: 1.61 m (5 ft 3 in)
- Position: Right back

Team information
- Current team: Pachuca
- Number: 2

Senior career*
Years	Team	Apps	(Gls)
2006–2009	Espanyol B		
2009–2011	Espanyol	44	(8)
2011–2014	Barcelona	50	(4)
2014–2015	Espanyol	24	(1)
2015–2020	Atlético de Madrid	98	(8)
2020–2024	Real Madrid	93	(3)
2024–	Pachuca	15	(1)

International career^{‡}
2008–2010	Mexico U20		
2010–	Mexico	106	(3)
2017	Catalonia	1	(0)
Medal record
Women's football
Representing Mexico
Central American and Caribbean Games
Gold medal – first place	2023 San Salvador
- * Club domestic league appearances and goals as of 15:53, 23 June 2024 (UTC) ‡ National team caps and goals as of 20 February 2025

Vaitiare Kenti Robles Salas (born 15 February 1991), known as Kenti Robles, is a Mexican professional footballer who plays as a right back for Liga MX Femenil side Pachuca and the Mexico women's national team. She also holds Spanish citizenship.

== Career ==
Robles has been playing in Spain since she was 14 years old, being brought up in Espanyol's youth team. In 2009, she was promoted to the first team, and that same season she won her first title, the Copa de la Reina. After playing the 2011 World Cup with Mexico, she moved to local rivals Barcelona where she played in the UEFA Women's Champions League and helped the team win three league titles from 2011 to 2014. In August 2014, she re-joined Espanyol. In 2015, she joined Atlético de Madrid, where she played for 5 years, earning her 3 La Liga titles and a Copa de la Reina. In the summer of 2020, she joined city rivals Real Madrid, who played the previous year as CD Tacón. This made Robles the first Mexican woman to play for Real Madrid. In 2022, Robles was named as the club captain of Real Madrid. She was also selected as part of the reformation process of the Mexican women's national football team following a major governance restructuring by the Mexican Football Federation. In 2024, she returned to Mexico to play for Pachuca Feminil.

=== International career ===
Robles made her debut for the Mexico women's national under-20 football team in 2010. She made her full debut for the Mexico women's national football team in 2011.

=== Atlético Madrid ===
In the 2018–19 season, the club changed coaches, with José Luis Sánchez Vera replacing Ángel Villacampa. In September 2018, Kenti Robles scored in the 88th minute of a Champions League match against Manchester City, securing a 1–1 draw after Bonner had given the English side the lead in the first half. Atlético went on to win the league title, clinching their third consecutive Liga Iberdrola crown with a 3–1 victory over Real Sociedad.

== Personal life ==
Before settling in Spain, Robles lived in the Dominican Republic. Her mother is originally from Peru.

== Honours ==
Espanyol

- Copa de la Reina: 2010

Barcelona

- Primera División: 2011–12, 2012–13, 2013–14
- Copa de la Reina: 2013, 2014

Atlético de Madrid

- Primera División: 2016–17, 2017–18
- Copa de la Reina: 2016
