= Alba Aznar =

Spanish footballer (born 1993)

Personal information
- Full name: Alba Aznar Martí
- Date of birth: 2 September 1993 (age 33)
- Place of birth: Reus, Spain
- Height: 1.53 m (5 ft 0 in)
- Position: Midfielder

Team information
- Current team: Alavés
- Number: 10

Senior career*
Years	Team	Apps	(Gls)
2009–2011	Gimnàstic de Tarragona	42	(6)
2011–2013	Barcelona	22	(3)
2013–2017	Zaragoza	116	(6)
2017–2018	Levante	21	(1)
2018–	Alavés	49+	(4+)

International career
2016–2017	Catalonia	2	(0)
- * Club domestic league appearances and goals as of 15:54, 23 January 2022 (UTC)

Alba Aznar Martí (born 2 September 1993) is a Spanish footballer who plays as a midfielder for Alavés.

== Club career ==
Aznar started her career at Gimnàstic de Tarragona.
