= Sara Monforte =

Spanish footballer and manager (born 1980)

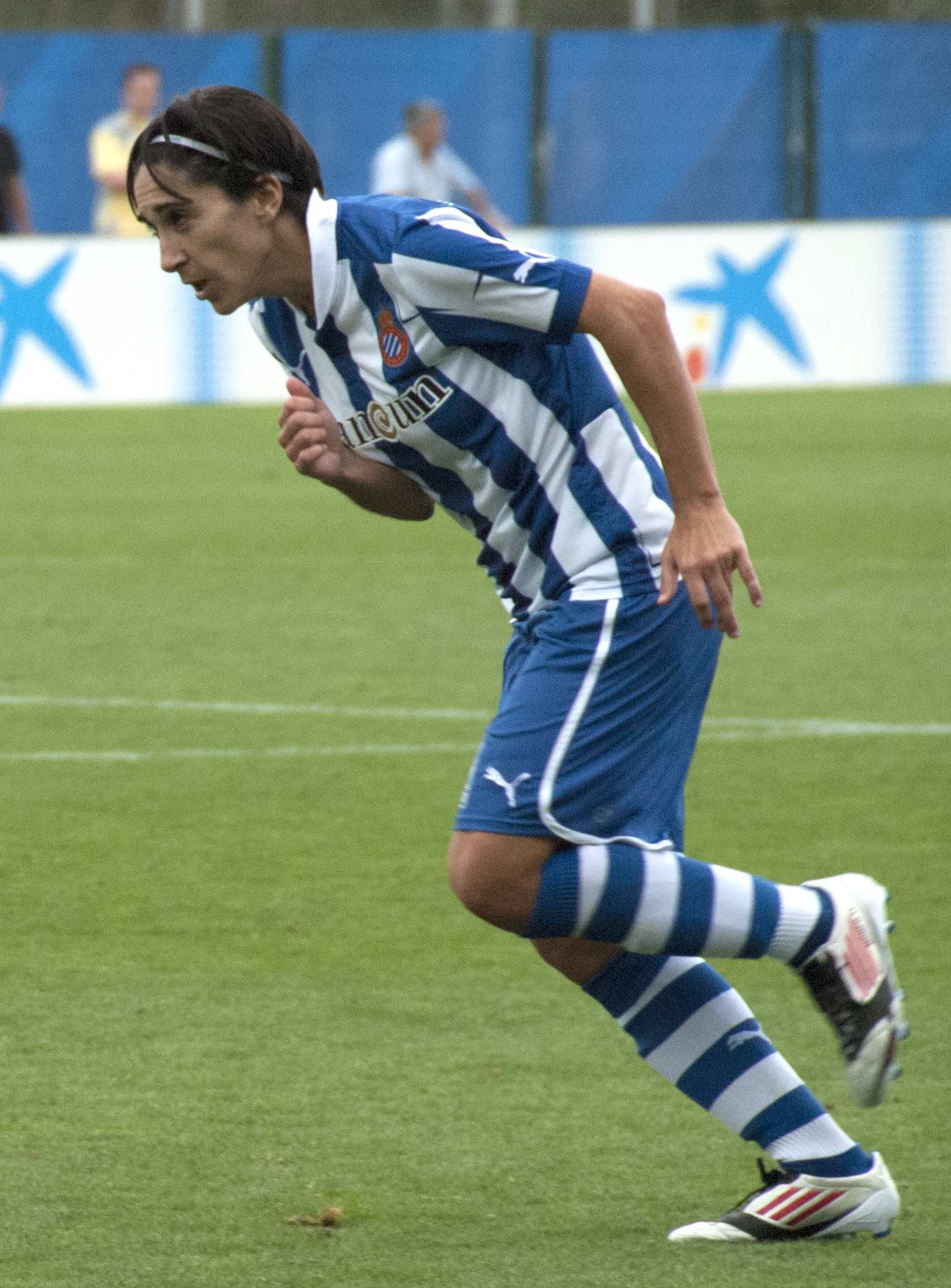
- Playing for Espanyol in 2012

Personal information
- Full name: Sara Monforte Mestre
- Date of birth: 14 October 1980 (age 46)
- Place of birth: Castellón, Spain
- Height: 1.69 m (5 ft 7 in)
- Position: Midfielder

Team information
- Current team: RCD Espanyol (women) (head coach)

Senior career*
Years	Team	Apps	(Gls)
1996–1999	Panteras Castellón		
1999–2002	Levante		
2002–2003	Villarreal		
2003–2007	Levante	93	(22)
2007–2008	Colegio Alemán		
2008–2009	Levante	28	(2)
2009–2013	Espanyol	96	(17)
2013–2016	Valencia	70	(13)
2016–2018	Zaragoza CFF	48	(2)

International career
1997–2005	Spain		

Managerial career
- 2018–: Villarreal (women)
- * Club domestic league appearances and goals

Sara Monforte Mestre (born 14 October 1980) is a Spanish retired football midfielder and the current manager of RCD Espanyol in the Liga F.

== Career ==
Monforte has developed her career in the Valencian Community and Catalonia, having previously played most notably for Levante and Espanyol, with which she won two championships and eight national cups. She also played for Valencia's predecessor Colegio Alemán for one season and later, from 2013 to 2016, before signing with Transportes Alcaine.

== International career ==
Monforte was a member of the Spanish national team for eight years, narrowly missing the 1997 European Championship.
