= Mari Paz Vilas =

Spanish footballer

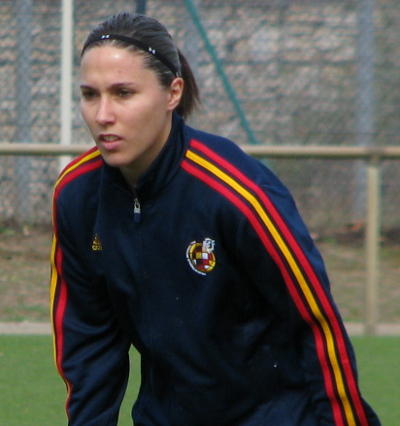
- Training for the national team in 2012

Personal information
- Full name: María de la Paz Vilas Dono
- Date of birth: 1 February 1988 (age 38)
- Place of birth: Vilagarcía de Arousa, Galicia, Spain
- Height: 1.60 m (5 ft 3 in)
- Position: Forward

Youth career
- Arosa

Senior career*
Years	Team	Apps	(Gls)
2002–2006	Atlético Arousana		(186)
2006–2008	Levante UD	49	(18)
2008–2011	Barcelona	45	(18)
2011–2013	Espanyol	59	(50)
2013–2020	Valencia	182	(126)
2020–2022	Real Betis	54	(14)
2022–2023	Levante Las Planas	26	(4)

International career
2006–2007	Spain U19	9	(9)
2008–2018	Spain	26	(15)
2007–2023	Galicia	2	(3)
- * Club domestic league appearances and goals

María de la Paz Vilas Dono (born 1 February 1988) is a Spanish footballer who played as a forward for Levante UD, Barcelona, Espanyol, Valencia, Real Betis, and Levante Las Planas in the Primera División. She has also represented Spain and Galicia. She has a Bachelor of Physiotherapy.

== Club career ==
Vilas started her senior career in 2002 with local team Atlético Arousana for whom she scored 186 goals until 2006, when she signed for Primera División club Levante UD.

In July 2008, following bankruptcy proceedings at Levante UD, Vilas left the club and signed with Barcelona, claiming it was the best offer she got and was supported by the national team manager.

In 2011, Vilas joined Espanyol. In June 2012, she scored the winning goal to help the club win their sixth Copa de la Reina, beating Athletic Bilbao 2–1 in the final of the 2012 edition. Looking back, Vilas says that her time at Espanyol relaunched her career, reaching her peak there.

In 2013, Vilas moved to Valencia, ahead of the 2013–14 Primera División season. In June 2018, Vilas signed a two-year contract extension, bringing her time at the club up to seven seasons, a club record. She was also the club's all-time top scorer with over 100 goals.

In July 2020, Vilas signed a two-year contract with Real Betis, as their first signing for the 2020–21 Primera División season. Her performance at Real Betis was worse than at Valencia, scoring only 14 goals in 54 appearances, while also being hampered by injuries.

In July 2022, Vilas joined Levante Las Planas. Two months later, she was announced as one of the captains for the 2022–23 Liga F season, together with Yasmin Mrabet, Júlia Mora, and Alba Mellado.

In May 2023, Vilas joined the seven-a-side football club Porcinas FC playing in the new Queens League as the first active professional footballer in the league. She scored 4 goals in 26 matches and decided to leave Levante Las Planas.

== International career ==
Vilas was a member of the Spanish national team during the 2009 European Championship qualifying, scoring a goal in her first match against Northern Ireland. Previously she scored the first of Spain's two goals in the 2007 Under-19 Euro.

Vilas set a new UEFA Women's Championship record in April 2012 when she scored seven goals in her team's 13–0 win over Kazakhstan marking her return to the national team.

== International goals ==
Mari Paz Vilas – goals for Spain
#	Date	Venue	Opponent	Score	Result	Competition
1	16 February 2008	Estadio El Montecillo, Aranda de Duero	Northern Ireland	3–0	4–0	Euro 2009 qualifying
2	5 April 2012	La Ciudad del Fútbol, Las Rozas de Madrid	Kazakhstan	4–0	13–0	Euro 2013 qualifying
3	5 April 2012	La Ciudad del Fútbol, Las Rozas de Madrid	Kazakhstan	5–0	13–0	Euro 2013 qualifying
4	5 April 2012	La Ciudad del Fútbol, Las Rozas de Madrid	Kazakhstan	6–0	13–0	Euro 2013 qualifying
5	5 April 2012	La Ciudad del Fútbol, Las Rozas de Madrid	Kazakhstan	7–0	13–0	Euro 2013 qualifying
6	5 April 2012	La Ciudad del Fútbol, Las Rozas de Madrid	Kazakhstan	9–0	13–0	Euro 2013 qualifying
7	5 April 2012	La Ciudad del Fútbol, Las Rozas de Madrid	Kazakhstan	10–0	13–0	Euro 2013 qualifying
8	5 April 2012	La Ciudad del Fútbol, Las Rozas de Madrid	Kazakhstan	13–0	13–0	Euro 2013 qualifying
9	16 June 2012	Stadion Brügglifeld, Aarau, Switzerland	Switzerland	1–1	4–3	Euro 2013 qualifying
10	21 June 2012	La Ciudad del Fútbol, Las Rozas de Madrid	Turkey	2–0	4–0	Euro 2013 qualifying
11	21 June 2012	La Ciudad del Fútbol, Las Rozas de Madrid	Turkey	3–0	4–0	Euro 2013 qualifying
12	8 April 2017	Kehrwegstadion, Eupen	Belgium	0–2	1–4	Friendly
13	30 June 2017	Pinatar Arena, San Pedro del Pinatar	Belgium	7–0	7–0	Friendly
14	28 February 2018	AEK Arena - Georgios Karapatakis, Larnaca	Austria	0–2	0–2	2018 Cyprus Women's Cup
15	7 June 2018	La Condomina, Murcia	Israel	1–0	2–0	2019 FIFA Women's World Cup qualification

Mari Paz Vilas – goals for Galicia
#	Date	Venue	Opponent	Score	Result	Competition
1	27 December 2007	Balaídos, Vigo	Catalonia	1–2	1–6	Friendly
2	28 December 2008	Pasarón, Pontevedra	Balearic Islands	1–0	7–1	Friendly
3	28 December 2008	Pasarón, Pontevedra	Balearic Islands	7–0	7–1	Friendly

== In popular culture ==
Vilas' hometown Vilagarcía de Arousa decided to rename their stadium in honour of her in February 2016.

== Honours ==
=== Club ===
Levante UD

- Primera División: Winner 2007–08
- Copa de la Reina de Fútbol: Winner 2007

FC Barcelona

- Copa de la Reina de Fútbol: Winner 2011
- Copa Catalunya: Winner 2009, 2010

RCD Espanyol

- Copa de la Reina de Fútbol: Winner 2012

Valencia CF

- Copa de la Reina de Fútbol: Runner-up 2015

=== International ===
Spain

- Cyprus Cup: Winner, 2018
