= Melisa Nicolau =

Spanish footballer (born 1984)

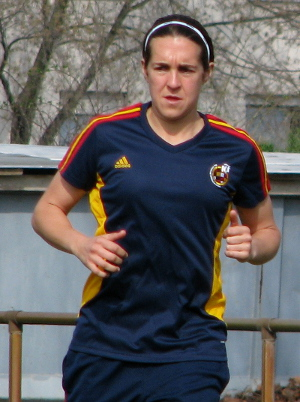

Personal information
- Full name: Melisa Nicolau Martín
- Date of birth: 20 June 1984 (age 42)
- Place of birth: Andratx, Spain
- Height: 1.65 m (5 ft 5 in)
- Position: Defender

Youth career
- 1993–1997: CD S'Arracó
- 1997–1998: CA Paguera

Senior career*
Years	Team	Apps	(Gls)
1998–2004	Platges Calvià		
2004–2010	Rayo Vallecano	83+	(0+)
2010–2013	FC Barcelona	64	(3)

International career
2002	Spain U19		
2004–2013	Spain	31	(0)
- * Club domestic league appearances and goals

Melisa Nicolau Martín (born 20 June 1984), commonly known as Melisa or Mely, is a Spanish former footballer, who played as a defender for Primera División clubs Rayo Vallecano and FC Barcelona, as well as the Spain women's national football team.

She has been a member of the Spain women's national football team, playing the qualification stages for the 2007 World Cup, the 2009 European Championship and the 2011 World Cup.

In June 2013, national team coach Ignacio Quereda confirmed Melisa as a member of his 23-player squad for the UEFA Women's Euro 2013 finals in Sweden. She decided to end her nine-year national team career and retire from football after the tournament.

== Titles ==
- 2 leagues: 2009, 2010 (Rayo Vallecano)
- 2 leagues: 2012, 2013 (F.C. Barcelona)
- 1 national cup: 2008 (Rayo Vallecano)
- 2 national cups: 2010, 2013 (F.C. Barcelona)
