= 2012–13 Primera División (women) =

Primera División
- Season: 2012–13
- Champions: Barcelona; 2nd title
- Relegated: Lagunak, Llanos Olivenza
- Champions League: Barcelona
- Matches: 240
- Goals: 803 (3.35 per match)
- Biggest home win: Rayo Vallecano 9–0 Lagunak
- Biggest away win: Lagunak 0–11 Barcelona
- Highest attendance: 26,000

The 2012–13 Primera División season was the 25th edition of Spain's highest women's football league. FC Barcelona were the defending champions, having won their 1st title in the previous season. The season played from 2 September 2012, and end on 5 May 2013.

A total of 16 teams contested the league, 14 of which already contested in the 2011–12 season. Sevilla and Levante Las Planas were promoted from the Segunda División last season.

The championship was decided on the last matchday, when Athletic Club Bilbao met Barcelona. After trailing Athletic the whole season, Barcelona overtook them by winning 2–1, and thus defended their title.

== Changes from 2011–12 ==
- The league was reduced from 18 to 16 teams. Therefore, only two teams will get relegated this year instead of four last season.

== Teams ==
=== Stadia and locations ===
Location of (qualified) teams in Primera Division 2012–13

| Team | Home city | Stadium | Stadium capacity |
|---|---|---|---|
| Athletic Bilbao | Bilbao | Instalaciones Lezama | 1,500 |
| Atlético Madrid | Majadahonda | Cerro del Espino | 3,500 |
| Barcelona | Barcelona | Ciutat Esportiva Joan Gamper | 1,000 |
| Collerense | Palma de Mallorca | Can Caimari | 1,000 |
| Espanyol | Cornellà de Llobregat | Ciudad Deportiva RCD Espanyol | 1,500 |
| Comarca Llanos Olivenza | Olivenza | Ciudad Deportiva de Olivenza | 1,000 |
| Levante | Valencia | Polideportiu Natzaret | 1,000 |
| Levante Las Planas | Sant Joan Despí | Municipal Les Planes | 1,000 |
| Lagunak | Barañáin | Municipal Lagunak | 1,000 |
| Rayo Vallecano | Madrid | Ciudad Deportiva Rayo Vallecano | 1,000 |
| Prainsa Zaragoza | Zaragoza | Pedro Sancho | 1,000 |
| Real Sociedad | San Sebastián | Instalaciones Zubieta | 2,500 |
| Sant Gabriel | Sant Adrià de Besòs | Municipal José Luis Ruiz Casado | 1,000 |
| Sevilla | Sevilla | Estadio Guadalquivir | 3,000 |
| Sporting de Huelva | Huelva | Ciudad Deportiva El Conquero | 1,000 |
| Valencia | Valencia | Municipal de Beniferri | 1,000 |

=== Personnel and sponsorship ===
| Team | Chairman | Head coach | Captain | Kitmaker | Shirt sponsor |
|---|---|---|---|---|---|
| Athletic Bilbao | (Spain) Josu Urrutia | (Spain) Juan Luis Fuentes | (Spain) Iraia Iturregi | Umbro | Bizkaia |
| Atlético Madrid | (Spain) Lola Romero | (Spain) Juanjo Carretero | (Spain) Marta Docando | Nike | None |
| Barcelona | (Spain) Sandro Rosell | (Spain) Xavier Llorens | (Spain) Ana Escribano | Nike | Qatar Foundation |
| Collerense | | (Spain) Joan Acuñas | | | |
| Espanyol | (Spain) Ramon Condal | (Spain) Luis Carrión | | Puma | Cancún |
| Lagunak | | (Spain) Álvaro Meoqui | | | |
| Levante | (Spain) Quico Catalán | (Spain) Antonio Contreras | (Spain) Maider Castillo | Luanvi | Valencia Terra i Mar |
| Levante Las Planas | | (Spain) Albert Sánchez | | | |
| Llanos Olivenza | | (Spain) Esteban Rodríguez | | | |
| Rayo Vallecano | (Spain) Raúl Martín Presa | (Spain) José Ramón Hernández | | Erreà | |
| Real Sociedad | (Spain) Jokin Aperribay | (Spain) Unai Gazpio Guesalaga | (Spain) Aintzane Encinas | Nike | La Gula del Norte |
| San Gabriel | | (Japan) Takahisa Shiraishi | | | |
| Sevilla | (Spain) José María del Nido | (Spain) Manuel Pineda Iglesias | | Umbro | |
| Sporting de Huelva | (Spain) José Antonio Muñoz Lozano | (Spain) Antonio Toledo | | | |
| Prainsa Zaragoza | | (Spain) Alberto Berna | | | |
| Valencia | (Spain) Manuel Llorente | (Argentina) Cristian Toro | (Spain) María Martí | Joma | Burger King |

== League table ==
| Pos | Team | Pld | W | D | L | GF | GA | GD | Pts | Qualification or relegation |
|---|---|---|---|---|---|---|---|---|---|---|
| 1 | Barcelona (C) | 30 | 24 | 4 | 2 | 91 | 13 | +78 | 76 | Qualification for UEFA Champions League and Copa de la Reina |
| 2 | Athletic Bilbao | 30 | 23 | 5 | 2 | 84 | 24 | +60 | 74 | Qualification Copa de la Reina |
| 3 | Atlético Madrid | 30 | 20 | 8 | 2 | 70 | 21 | +49 | 68 | Qualification Copa de la Reina |
| 4 | Levante | 30 | 21 | 2 | 7 | 53 | 21 | +32 | 65 | Qualification Copa de la Reina |
| 5 | Espanyol | 30 | 16 | 6 | 8 | 47 | 25 | +22 | 54 | Qualification Copa de la Reina |
| 6 | Rayo Vallecano | 30 | 14 | 7 | 9 | 81 | 48 | +33 | 49 | Qualification Copa de la Reina |
| 7 | Prainsa Zaragoza | 30 | 14 | 3 | 13 | 65 | 77 | −12 | 45 | Qualification Copa de la Reina |
| 8 | Sant Gabriel | 30 | 11 | 7 | 12 | 40 | 44 | −4 | 40 | Qualification Copa de la Reina |
| 9 | Sporting Huelva | 30 | 11 | 5 | 14 | 41 | 52 | −11 | 38 | |
| 10 | Real Sociedad | 30 | 9 | 6 | 15 | 41 | 44 | −3 | 33 | |
| 11 | Levante Las Planas | 30 | 9 | 5 | 16 | 34 | 47 | −13 | 32 | |
| 12 | Sevilla | 30 | 8 | 6 | 16 | 37 | 52 | −15 | 30 | |
| 13 | Valencia | 30 | 9 | 3 | 18 | 29 | 52 | −23 | 30 | |
| 14 | Collerense | 30 | 8 | 5 | 17 | 47 | 77 | −30 | 29 | |
| 15 | Llanos de Olivenza (R) | 30 | 3 | 7 | 20 | 30 | 74 | −44 | 16 | Relegation to Segunda División |
| 16 | Lagunak (R) | 30 | 0 | 1 | 29 | 13 | 132 | −119 | 1 | Relegation to Segunda División |

Source: soccerway.com
Rules for classification: 1) points; 2) head-to-head points; 3) goal difference; 4) number of goals scored
(C) Champions; (R) Relegated

== Results ==
| Home \ Away | FCB | ATH | ATM | LEV | ESP | RAY | PRA | SGB | SPH | RSC | LLP | SEV | VAL | CLL | OLI | LAG |
|---|---|---|---|---|---|---|---|---|---|---|---|---|---|---|---|---|
| Barcelona | | 0–0 | 2–0 | 1–0 | 1–0 | 0–2 | 6–2 | 7–1 | 4–0 | 4–0 | 4–0 | 2–0 | 4–0 | 4–0 | 5–0 | 6–1 |
| Athletic Bilbao | 1–2 | | 1–2 | 1–0 | 4–1 | 3–2 | 5–2 | 2–0 | 2–1 | 2–1 | 4–0 | 4–0 | 4–0 | 4–0 | 5–0 | 5–0 |
| Atlético Madrid | 1–1 | 1–1 | | 1–1 | 0–0 | 3–3 | 4–0 | 3–0 | 1–1 | 1–0 | 1–0 | 2–1 | 3–0 | 3–1 | 5–1 | 6–1 |
| Levante | 0–1 | 0–1 | 1–0 | | 0–1 | 2–1 | 1–0 | 3–1 | 1–0 | 2–1 | 2–0 | 1–2 | 1–0 | 4–1 | 2–0 | 7–0 |
| Espanyol | 2–0 | 1–1 | 1–1 | 1–2 | | 1–3 | 4–0 | 1–2 | 3–0 | 3–0 | 2–0 | 2–0 | 2–0 | 0–0 | 4–1 | 1–0 |
| Rayo Vallecano | 2–2 | 2–4 | 1–2 | 2–3 | 1–4 | | 3–3 | 6–0 | 1–1 | 4–3 | 2–2 | 3–1 | 0–1 | 5–0 | 3–1 | 9–0 |
| Prainsa Zaragoza | 0–4 | 1–6 | 0–3 | 2–2 | 4–1 | 1–3 | | 2–0 | 5–4 | 2–0 | 4–3 | 1–3 | 3–2 | 4–3 | 3–2 | 7–2 |
| San Gabriel | 0–2 | 0–1 | 0–2 | 0–1 | 0–2 | 1–1 | 3–2 | | 3–2 | 2–0 | 0–0 | 3–1 | 1–0 | 3–0 | 3–0 | 4–0 |
| Sporting Huelva | 0–5 | 1–1 | 0–3 | 2–0 | 0–1 | 0–2 | 0–2 | 2–1 | | 0–1 | 3–0 | 3–0 | 1–0 | 2–1 | 1–1 | 4–1 |
| Real Sociedad | 0–3 | 1–2 | 0–1 | 0–1 | 1–1 | 1–1 | 2–2 | 1–1 | 3–0 | | 2–0 | 0–1 | 4–0 | 5–1 | 3–0 | 2–1 |
| Levante Las Planas | 0–1 | 1–2 | 1–3 | 1–3 | 1–0 | 2–5 | 0–1 | 0–0 | 0–2 | 3–0 | | 0–0 | 1–0 | 6–0 | 0–0 | 3–0 |
| Sevilla | 1–1 | 1–4 | 0–2 | 0–1 | 1–2 | 1–2 | 2–4 | 2–0 | 0–0 | 1–1 | 2–3 | | 0–0 | 1–4 | 2–2 | 4–2 |
| Valencia | 0–3 | 1–5 | 0–2 | 0–2 | 1–0 | 2–1 | 4–1 | 2–2 | 1–2 | 1–1 | 0–1 | 0–2 | | 2–1 | 1–0 | 4–0 |
| Collerense | 0–2 | 3–3 | 1–1 | 0–2 | 1–1 | 2–1 | 4–2 | 0–4 | 3–4 | 4–3 | 3–4 | 1–0 | 4–0 | | 1–1 | 5–0 |
| Llanos Olivenza | 0–3 | 0–2 | 2–5 | 1–4 | 0–4 | 0–3 | 1–3 | 2–2 | 1–1 | 0–1 | 1–0 | 2–3 | 1–2 | 5–2 | | 1–1 |
| Lagunak | 0–11 | 0–4 | 0–8 | 0–4 | 0–1 | 2–7 | 0–2 | 1–2 | 0–5 | 0–4 | 0–2 | 0–4 | 0–5 | 1–2 | 0–3 | |

Updated to match(es) played on 21 April 2013. Source: women.soccerway.com
Legend: Blue = home team win; Yellow = draw; Red = away team win.
- Match Sporting Huelva–Sevilla was awarded to Sporting by 3–0 due to illegal alignment. The match initially ended 0–0.

== See also ==
- 2012–13 Segunda División (women)
- 2013 Copa de la Reina de Fútbol
