= List of Athletic Bilbao Femenino seasons =

This is a list of seasons played by Athletic Bilbao Femenino, Athletic Bilbao's women's section, in Spanish and European football, since the 2002–03 season, the first one as Athletic Bilbao.

== Summary ==
Champions	Runners-up	Promoted	Relegated

Season	League										Cup	Supercup	UWCL	Top scorer	
Season	Tier	Div	Pos	Pld	W	D	L	GF	GA	Pts	Cup	Supercup	UWCL	Name(s)	Goal
2002–03	1	1ª	1st	22	17	4	1	89	17	55	Quarterfinals			(Spain) Eba Ferreira (Spain) Nerea Onaindia	15
2003–04	1	1ª	1st	26	19	3	4	80	29	60	Semifinals		Round of 32	(Spain) Eba Ferreira	15
2004–05	1	1ª	1st	26	20	6	0	77	15	66	Quarterfinals		Round of 16	(Spain) Erika Vázquez	26
2005–06	1	1ª	5th	24	13	2	9	52	46	41	Quarterfinals		Qualifying	(Spain) Iraia Iturregi	11
2006–07	1	1ª	1st	26	20	4	2	82	27	64	Quarterfinals			(Spain) Eba Ferreira (Spain) Eli Ibarra (Spain) Erika Vázquez	13
2007–08	1	1ª	3rd	26	17	2	7	72	31	53	Quarterfinals		Qualifying	(Spain) Erika Vázquez	21
2008–09	1	1ª	3rd	30	21	2	7	100	43	65	Quarterfinals			(Spain) Erika Vázquez	32
2009–10	1	1ª	3rd	28	19	5	4	75	35	62	Quarterfinals			(Spain) Erika Vázquez	13
2010–11	1	1ª	3rd	28	20	2	6	90	23	62	Quarterfinals			(Spain) Nekane Díez	24
2011–12	1	1ª	2nd	34	29	4	1	118	25	91	Runner-up			(Spain) Erika Vázquez	25
2012–13	1	1ª	2nd	30	23	5	2	84	24	74	Quarterfinals			(Spain) Erika Vázquez	18
2013–14	1	1ª	2nd	30	22	3	5	79	22	69	Runner-up			(Spain) Erika Vázquez	20
2014–15	1	1ª	3rd	30	19	8	3	73	24	65	Quarterfinals			(Spain) Nekane Díez (Spain) Erika Vázquez	17
2015–16	1	1ª	1st	30	25	3	2	75	15	78	Quarterfinals			(Spain) Yulema Corres	14
2016–17	1	1ª	5th	30	16	5	9	64	44	53	Quarterfinals		Round of 32	(Spain) Yulema Corres	18
2017–18	1	1ª	3rd	30	18	2	10	51	41	56	Semifinals			(Spain) Nekane Díez (Spain) Erika Vázquez	13
2018–19	1	1ª	5th	30	14	8	8	48	33	50	Quarterfinals			(Spain) Lucía García	13
2019–20	1	1ª	5th	21	11	4	6	30	23	35	Semifinals			(Spain) Lucía García	9
2020–21	1	1ª	11th	34	11	7	16	43	60	40				(Spain) Lucía García	16
2021–22	1	1ª	7th	30	14	5	11	45	47	47	Round of 16			(Spain) Lucía García (Spain) Ane Azkona	11
2022–23	1	1ª	10th	30	10	5	15	34	44	35	Semifinals			(Spain) Clara Pinedo	7
2023–24	1	1ª	5th	30	17	2	11	38	37	53	Semifinals			(Spain) Ane Azkona	7
2024–25	1	1ª	4th	30	16	3	11	40	32	51	Round of 16			(Spain) Ane Azkona	6
2025–26	1	1ª	7th	30	12	8	10	35	44	44	Quarterfinals	Semifinals		(Spain) Ane Azkona	7
