= Levante UD Femenino in European football =

This is an article showing the matches of Levante UD women's team in UEFA international competitions. Levante has appeared in three occasions in the UEFA Women's Cup, including the 2001-02 inaugural edition.

== Overall record ==
Season	Competition	Round	Opponent	Result	Scorers
2001–02	UEFA Women's Cup	Group stage	(Germany) Frankfurt	0–1	
2001–02	UEFA Women's Cup	Group stage	(Armenia) College SC	17–0	Jiménez 4, Prieto 4, R. Castillo 2, Gimbert 2, Monje 2, Fuentes, Del Río, Soler
2001–02	UEFA Women's Cup	Group stage	(Moldova) Codru Chişinău	3–1	Gimbert, Jiménez, Soler
2002–03	UEFA Women's Cup	Group stage	(Belgium) Eendracht Aalst	8–0	Fuentes 3, Jiménez 2, Prieto 2, Gimbert
2002–03	UEFA Women's Cup	Group stage	(England) Arsenal	1–2	Prieto
2002–03	UEFA Women's Cup	Group stage	(Azerbaijan) Gömrükçü Baku	2–1	Fuentes, Moreno
2008–09	UEFA Women's Cup	Preliminary Stage	(North Macedonia) Skopje	8–0	Conti 3, Pérez 3, Donaire, González
2008–09	UEFA Women's Cup	Preliminary Stage	(Belgium) Tienen	9–2	Conti 3, Donaire 3, Del Río, Vilanova
2008–09	UEFA Women's Cup	Preliminary Stage	(Czech Republic) Sparta Prague	0–0	
2008–09	UEFA Women's Cup	Group stage	(Denmark) Brøndby	0–1	
2008–09	UEFA Women's Cup	Group stage	(Germany) Duisburg	0–5	
2008–09	UEFA Women's Cup	Group stage	(Ukraine) Naftokhimik Kalush	4–1	R. Castillo, Pérez, Prim, Ves

== 2001-02 UEFA Women's Cup ==
=== First stage ===
3 October 2001

1. FFC Frankfurt (Germany)	1 – 0	(Spain) Levante UD
Wunderlich 67'

Stadion am Brentanobad, Frankfurt
Attendance: 1,200
5 October 2001

Levante UD (Spain)	17 – 0	(Armenia) CSC Yerevan
Prieto 2', 12', 38', 61'; Jiménez 7', 43', 52', 72'; Gimbert 35', 45'; R. Castillo 36', 60'; Del Río 39'; Monje 51', 76'; Fuentes 88'; Soler 90'

Stadion am Brentanobad, Frankfurt
7 October 2001

Levante UD (Spain)	3 – 1	(Moldova) Codru Chişinău
Gimbert 12'; Soler 33'; Jiménez 43'		Frishko 30'

Stadion am Brentanobad, Frankfurt

== 2002-03 UEFA Women's Cup ==
=== First stage ===
25 September 2002

Levante UD (Spain)	8 – 0	(Belgium) Eendracht Aalst
Prieto 1', 53'; Jiménez 37', 76'; Gimbert 51'; Fuentes 62', 67', 81'

London
27 September 2002

Arsenal FC (England)	2 – 1	(Spain) Levante UD
Maggs 11'; White 62'		Prieto 14'

London
29 September 2002

Levante UD (Spain)	2 – 1	(Azerbaijan) Gömrükçü Baku
Fuentes 35'; Moreno 73'		Lemeshko 51'

London

== 2008-09 UEFA Women's Cup ==
=== Preliminary stage ===
4 September 2008

ZFK Skiponjat (North Macedonia)	0 – 9	(Spain) Levante UD
		Pérez 1', 2', 34'; Donaire 21'; Conti 48', 56', 64'; González 75' ? 83' (o.g.)

Skopje
6 September 2008

Levante UD (Spain)	9 – 2	(Belgium) KVK Tienen
del Río 5', 61'; Vilanova 8'; Donaire 34', 48', 69'; Conti 39', 77', 79'		? 26' ? 66'

Skopje
9 September 2008

Levante UD (Spain)	0 – 0	(Czech Republic) Sparta Prague

Skopje

=== First stage ===
10 October 2008

Levante UD (Spain)	0 – 1	(Denmark) Brøndby IF
		Christiansen 62'

Kalush
12 October 2008

Levante UD (Spain)	0 – 5	(Germany) FCR Duisburg
		Grings 4', 7'; Laudehr 30', 63'; Hartmann 79'

Kalush
Referee: (Hungary) Gyöngyi Gaál
14 October 2008

Naftokhimik Kalush (Ukraine)	1 – 4	(Spain) Levante UD
Pasichnyk		Prim 27'; Pérez 43'; R. Castillo 65'; Ves 90'

Kalush
Referee: (Estonia) Maaren Olander
