= List of Zaragoza CFF seasons =

This is a list of seasons played by Zaragoza CFF, a Spanish women's football club based in Zaragoza (Aragón) formerly known as CD Transportes Alcaine, from its foundation in 2002.

== Summary ==
Domestic and international results of CD Transportes Alcaine
Season	League										Cup	Europe	League top scorer					
Season	Division	Tier	Pos	P	W	D	L	F	A	Pts	Cup	Europe	1st	Goal	2nd	Goal	3rd	Goal
2002–03	Primera Nacional	2	7	26	11	5	10	53	28	38								
2003–04	Primera Nacional	2	4	26	16	1	9	54	26	49								
2004–05	Primera Nacional	2	1	26	19	3	4	65	22	60								
2005–06	Superliga	1	12	26	5	3	16	31	67	18								
2006–07	Superliga	1	12	26	5	5	16	20	50	20								
2007–08	Superliga	1	8	26	10	5	11	40	47	35	SF							
2008–09	Superliga	1	5	30	15	6	9	52	33	51	RU							
2009–10	Superliga	1	6	28	13	5	10	54	35	44	QF							
2010–11	Superliga	1	6	28	13	2	13	54	44	41	QF							
2011–12	Primera División	1	9	34	14	5	15	72	75	47								
2012–13	Primera División	1	7	30	14	3	13	65	77	45	RU							
2013–14	Primera División	1	12	30	8	7	15	29	55	31			(Colombia) Velásquez	8	(Spain) Cirauqui	5	(Spain) Mallada	4
2014–15	Primera División	1	13	30	5	10	15	27	53	25			(Spain) Bernal ^{N}	5	(Spain) Cardona	5	(Senegal) Ndiaye	4
2015–16	Primera División	1	12	30	10	2	18	38	68	32			(Switzerland) Maglia ^{N}	6	(Spain) Martínez ^{N}	6	(United States) Hastings	6

Domestic and international results of Zaragoza CFF
Season	League										Cup	Europe	League top scorers					
Season	Division	Tier	Pos	P	W	D	L	F	A	Pts	Cup	Europe	1st	Goal	2nd	Goal	3rd	Goal
2016–17	Primera División	1	12	30	8	8	14	31	65	32			(Spain) Mallada	8	(Spain) Cardona	5	(Spain) García	4
