= María José Pérez (footballer) =

Spanish footballer (born 1984)

Personal information
- Full name: María José Pérez González
- Date of birth: 19 March 1984 (age 42)
- Place of birth: Santa Cruz de Tenerife, Spain
- Height: 1.57 m (5 ft 2 in)
- Position: Forward

Team information
- Current team: Alhama CF
- Number: 21

Youth career
- Añazo

Senior career*
Years	Team	Apps	(Gls)
- Fasnia Brisas del Teide
- Candela
2002–2005	Sabadell		
2005–2006	Estudiantes		
2006–2008	Irex Puebla		
2008–2009	Tacuense		
2009–2010	Charco del Pino		
2010–2013	Tacuense		
2013–2016	Granadilla		
2016–2017	Levante	30	(16)
2017–2026	Granadilla	227	(53)
2026	CD Argual	0	(0)
2026-	Alhama CF	13	(0)

International career
- Spain U19
2007–2016	Spain	10	(1)
- * Club domestic league appearances and goals as of 13 March 2019

María José Pérez González (born 19 March 1984) is a Spanish footballer who plays for Alhama CF of Spain's Liga F. She has also played for the Spain national team.

== Club career ==
Pérez played most of her career with teams based in the Canary Islands. In 2015, she achieved promotion to the Primera División with Granadilla. In 2016, Pérez left the archipelago to sign for Levante UD.

== Personal life ==
The Villarreal footballer Ayoze Pérez is her cousin.

== Honours ==
Sabadell

- Copa de la Reina de Fútbol: 2003
