= Elisabeth Ibarra =

Spanish footballer

Eli Ibarra
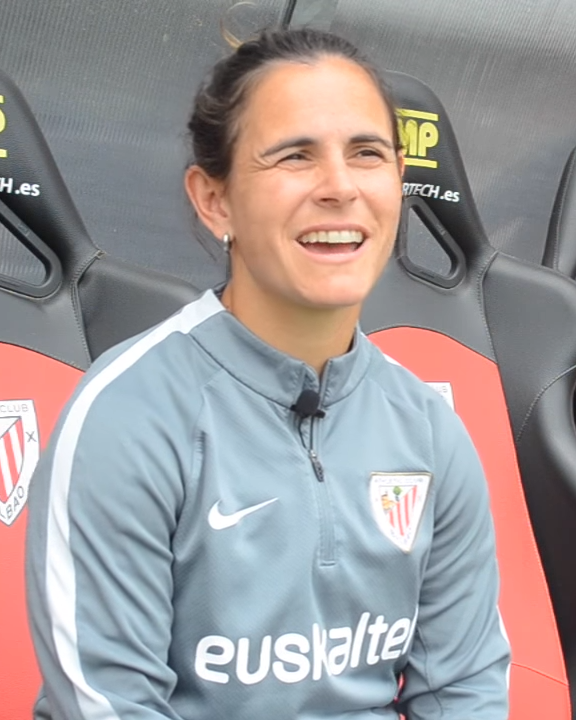
- Ibarra in 2017

Personal information
- Full name: Elisabeth Ibarra Rabancho
- Date of birth: 29 June 1981 (age 45)
- Place of birth: Azkoitia, Basque Country, Spain
- Height: 1.59 m (5 ft 3 in)
- Positions: Left midfielder; left wing-back

Senior career*
Years	Team	Apps	(Gls)
1995–2002	Eibartarrak FT		
2002–2017	Athletic Bilbao	367	(104)

International career
2000–2015	Spain	44	(2)
2006–2014	Basque Country	4	(0)
- * Club domestic league appearances and goals

Elisabeth "Eli" Ibarra Rabancho (born 29 June 1981) is a Spanish retired footballer who played as a midfielder or defender. She played club football for Eibartarrak FT from 1995 to 2002 and for Primera División club Athletic Bilbao from 2002 to 2017. She made 44 appearances for the Spain national team, scoring two goals.

Ibarra held the record for most appearances for the women's first-team of Athletic Bilbao (413) until overtaken by former teammate Erika Vázquez in 2022. Her 111 goals across all competitions made her their third-highest goalscorer of all time. She is also the only player to have taken part in all five league championships that the club has won.

== Club career ==
Ibarra started playing football at the age of 13. She played for Eibartarrak FT (now SD Eibar) for seven seasons, from 1995 to 2002, before joining the newly-founded women's team of Athletic Bilbao in the summer of 2002, ahead of the 2002–03 Superliga Femenina season. When she first arrived at the club, she chose the number 17 shirt, in homage to former Athletic footballer Joseba Etxeberria. She made her debut in a 7–1 win over Torrejón at the Lezama Facilities, in what was the first ever match played by Athletic's women's team.

Ibarra scored in Athletic's first two appearances in the UEFA Women's Cup. In December 2012, she played her 300th match for Athletic. In 2016, she won her fifth league title with Athletic and agreed to remain with the club for another year.

In May 2017, at the age of 35, she announced her retirement from football. She made a total of 413 appearances for Athletic Bilbao – 367 in the league, 32 in the Copa de la Reina, and 14 in the Champions League. She is the club's third highest goalscorer of all-time, behind Erika Vázquez and Nekane Díez, with 111 goals; of those, 104 came in the league, five in the Copa de la Reina, and two in the Champions League.

== International career ==
Ibarra was a member of the Spain national team, where she was deployed by Ignacio Quereda as a left wing-back. She was part of Spain's squads for UEFA Women's Euro 2013 in Sweden and the 2015 FIFA Women's World Cup in Canada.

== Career statistics ==
List of international goals scored by Elisabeth Ibarra
No.	Date	Venue	Opponent	Score	Result	Competition	Ref.
1	24 June 2010	Estadio Municipal de La Albuera, Segovia, Spain	Malta	3–0	9–0	2011 FIFA Women's World Cup qualification	
2	24 June 2010	Estadio Municipal de La Albuera, Segovia, Spain	Malta	7–0	9–0	2011 FIFA Women's World Cup qualification	

== Honours ==
Athletic Bilbao

- Primera División: 2002–03, 2003–04, 2004–05, 2006–07, 2015–16
