= CD Híspalis =

Spanish football club

- Full name: Club Deportivo Híspalis
- Founded: 1972; 1992 (women's team)
- Ground: Hytasa, Sevilla
- League: Liga Andaluza
- 2011-12: Segunda División – Group 4, 13th (relegated)
Home colours

Club Deportivo Híspalis is a Spanish football club from Seville founded in 1972. It is best known for its women's team, created in 1992, which currently plays in the Segunda División.

== History ==
CD Híspalis was one of the eleven founding members of the reunified Superliga Femenina in 2002. For the first three seasons it ranked in the league's bottom half, but in 2004 it signed a collaboration with Sevilla FC to represent it in the Superliga, taking its name, crest and kit. Through this partnership it became one of the leading teams in the league, and in 2006 nearly won the championship; the team stood in the lead before the last round with a two-point advantage over RCD Espanyol, but drew 3–3 at defending champion Athletic Bilbao's ground and Espanyol won their match and claimed the league on goal difference.

Reaching the national cup's semifinals the following year was Híspalis last major success, as the team collapsed in the 2008 season, ending last and being thus relegated. Following the relegation Sevilla FC broke the partnership, creating its own team. This was a major blow for the club, which for the next four seasons never had promotion options, and in 2012 it was instead relegated to the third tier, having ended second to last in the table.

== Season to season ==
Season	Div.	Pos.	Copa de la Reina
1998/99	1ª	4th	
1999/00	1ª	2nd	Quarterfinals
2000/01	1ª	2nd	Quarterfinals
2001/02	1ª	9th	Quarterfinals
2002/03	1ª	9th	Quarterfinals
2003/04	1ª	12th	
2004/05	1ª	5th	Quarterfinals
2005/06	1ª	2nd	Quarterfinals
2006/07	1ª	5th	Semifinals
2007/08	1ª	14th	
2008/09	2ª	7th	
2009/10	2ª	6th	
2010/11	2ª	9th	
2011/12	2ª	13th	
2012/13	Regional	5th	
2013/14	Regional	1st	
2014/15	2ª	11th	
2015/16	2ª	10th	
2016/17	2ª	11th	
2017/18	2ª	8th	
2018/19	2ª	9th (Note: Due to the creation of the new Primera División B, the team remained in the same league but it became the third level.)	
2019/20	Pr. Nac.	12th	

== Former internationals ==
- (Spain) Priscila Borja
- (Spain) Rosa Castillo
- (Spain) Vanesa Gimbert
- (Spain) Auxiliadora Jiménez
- (Spain) Alexandra López
- (Spain) Ana Romero
