= 2005 Copa de la Reina de Fútbol =

Tournament details
- Country: Spain

The 2005 Copa de S.M. La Reina de Fútbol was the 23rd edition of Spain's women's football national cup. The previous edition's reduction to four teams was reverted, and the cup was contested by the top eight teams in the 2004-05 Superliga from May 15 to June 12, 2005.

Defending champion Levante UD defeated CFF Puebla in the final to win its fifth title in six years. AD Torrejón and Rayo Vallecano also reached the semifinals.

== Qualification ==
Pos	Team	Pld	W	D	L	GF	GF	Pts	PS
1	Athletic Club	26	20	6	0	77	15	66	Same position
2	Levante	26	20	3	3	74	18	63	▲1
3	Espanyol	26	18	3	5	92	46	57	▲5
4	Torrejón	26	17	4	5	52	28	55	▲1
5	Híspalis	26	15	4	7	67	32	49	Same position
6	Puebla	26	13	4	9	55	37	43	▼2
7	Rayo Vallecano	26	11	1	14	53	54	34	▲2
8	Sabadell	26	8	5	13	59	63	29	▼6

=== Teams by autonomous community ===
Community	Teams
(Catalonia) Catalunya	2: Espanyol, Sabadell
(Community of Madrid) Madrid	2: Rayo Vallecano, Torrejón
(Andalusia) Andalucía	1: Híspalis
(Basque Country (autonomous community)) Euskadi	1: Athletic Club
Extremadura	1: Puebla
(Valencian Community) Comunidad Valenciana	1: Levante

== Results ==
=== Quarter-finals ===
Team 1	Agg.	Team 2	1st leg	2nd leg
Torrejón	6–4	Sabadell	3–1	3–3
Athletic Club	0–4	Levante	0–2	0–2
Puebla	3–1	Híspalis	2–1	1–0
Espanyol	3–5	Rayo Vallecano	1–5	2–0

=== Semifinals ===
Team 1	Agg.	Team 2	1st leg	2nd leg
Torrejón	0–6	Levante	0–2	0–4
Puebla	5–1	Rayo Vallecano	4–1	1–0

==== First leg ====
May 29, 2005

Torrejón	0 – 2	Levante
		Del Río 6'; Vilar 90'

Las Veredillas, Torrejón de Ardoz

==== Second leg ====
June 5, 2005

Levante	4 – 0	Torrejón
Crespo 9'; Vilanova 37'; Kátia 52'; Prim 89'

Mundial 82, Catarroja
Attendance: 300
Referee: Fernández Meca

=== Final ===
June 12, 2005
12:00

Levante	2 – 1	Puebla
Monforte 15'; Mateos 47'		Lourdes 48'

Breña Alta, La Palma
Attendance: 1,000
Referee: Pérez Riverol
