= Priscila Borja =

Spanish footballer (born 1985)

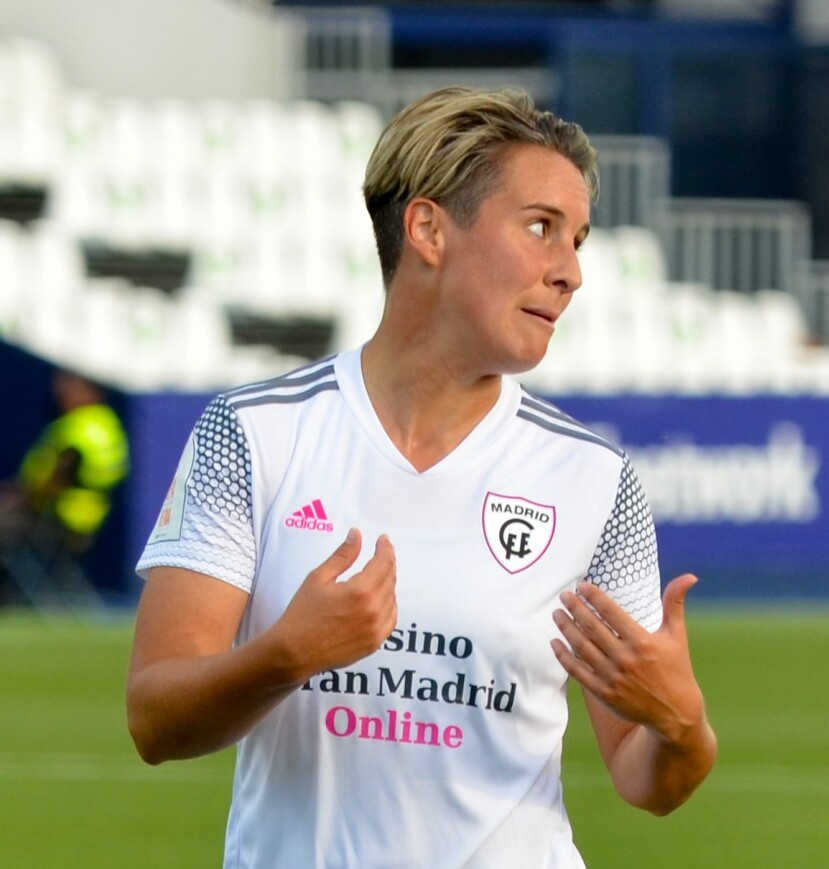
- Pictured 2021

Personal information
- Full name: Priscila Borja Moreno
- Date of birth: 28 April 1985 (age 41)
- Place of birth: Alcalá de Guadaira, Spain
- Height: 1.65 m (5 ft 5 in)
- Position: Forward

Senior career*
Years	Team	Apps	(Gls)
2001–2002	Hispalis		
2002–2005	Sabadell		
2005–2006	Estudiantes Huelva		
2006–2008	Puebla		
2008–2009	Sporting Huelva	24	(6)
2009–2013	Atlético Madrid	107+	(63+)
2013–2014	Rayo Vallecano	29	(13)
2014–2017	Atlético Madrid	79	(36)
2017–2020	Real Betis	76	(26)
2020–2021	Madrid	33	(8)

International career^{‡}
- Spain U19
2010–2015	Spain	25	(6)
- * Club domestic league appearances and goals as of 20 June 2021 ‡ National team caps and goals as of 20 June 2021

Priscila Borja Moreno (born 28 April 1985) is a former Spanish footballer who played as a winger or forward. She previously was a member of the Spain women's national team.

== Club career ==
Coming from the ranks of Seville's CD Hispalis, she moved at 17 to Sabadell, where she won a national Cup. After Sabadell withdrew from the competition in 2005 she moved to Estudiantes Huelva, which disappeared following the end of the season. She then signed for Club Irex Puebla. When Puebla fused with AD Las Mercedes to form Extremadura FCF she returned to Huelva to play for Sporting, and signed for Atlético Madrid in 2009.

In 2021, Borja announced her retirement after a 20-year-long football career, with her final spell being at Madrid CFF.

== International career ==
Following an outstanding 2010–11 season with Atlético, Borja was called for the first time by the senior Spanish national team for their first match in 2013 Euro qualifying, against Turkey. Borja started the match and contributed two goals to Spain's 10–1 win.

In June 2013, national team coach Ignacio Quereda confirmed Borja as a member of his 23-player squad for the UEFA Women's Euro 2013 finals in Sweden.

=== International goals ===
No.	Date	Venue	Opponent	Score	Result	Competition
1.	17 September 2011	Recep Tayyip Erdoğan Stadium, Istanbul, Turkey	Turkey	2–0	10–1	UEFA Women's Euro 2013 qualifying
2.	17 September 2011	Recep Tayyip Erdoğan Stadium, Istanbul, Turkey	Turkey	7–1	10–1	UEFA Women's Euro 2013 qualifying
3.	15 February 2012	Estadio Multiusos de San Lázaro, Santiago de Compostela, Spain	Austria	3–1	4–1	Friendly
4.	5 April 2012	La Ciudad del Fútbol, Madrid, Spain	Kazakhstan	3–0	13–0	UEFA Women's Euro 2013 qualifying
5.	5 April 2012	La Ciudad del Fútbol, Madrid, Spain	Kazakhstan	8–0	13–0	UEFA Women's Euro 2013 qualifying
6.	10 February 2015	Pinatar Arena, San Pedro del Pinatar, Spain	Austria	2–1	2–2	Friendly

== Honours ==
=== Club ===
CE Sabadell

- Copa de la Reina de Fútbol (1): 2003

Atlético Madrid

- Primera División (1): 2016–17
- Copa de la Reina de Fútbol (1): 2016
