= Alicia Fuentes =

Spanish footballer

Personal information
- Full name: Alicia Fuentes Molina
- Date of birth: 27 May 1978 (age 48)
- Place of birth: Totalán, Spain
- Height: 1.63 m (5 ft 4 in)
- Positions: Defender; midfielder; striker

Team information
- Current team: Monterrey U-19 (women) (Manager)

Senior career*
Years	Team	Apps	(Gls)
1994–2000	Atlético Málaga		
2000–2003	Levante		
2003–2004	Estudiantes Huelva		
2004–2007	Sevilla		
2007–2008	Murcia Féminas		
2008–2010	Barcelona		
2010–2012	Atlético Málaga		
2012–2013	Levante Las Planas	29	(2)
2013–2014	Atlétíco Málaga		
2014–2020	Sevilla		

International career
1997–2002	Spain		

Managerial career
- 2024: Monterrey U-19 (women) (Assistant)
- 2024–: Monterrey U-19 (women)
- 2025: Monterrey (women) (Assistant)
- * Club domestic league appearances and goals

Alicia Fuentes Molina (born 27 May 1978), commonly known as Ali, is a Spanish football manager and former player who played mainly as a midfielder, and is currently an assistant manager at Liga MX Femenil club Monterrey. As a player, she was at her peak between 1997 and 2003, when she won three Spanish leagues and four Spanish cups and she was a member of the Spain women's national football team, taking part in the 1997 European Championship.

== Club career ==
Born in Totalán, Málaga, Fuentes' first team was Atlético Málaga, the main women's club in the province. With Atlético she won both the national championship and the national cup in 1998. In 2000, she signed for Levante UD, taking part in their golden age. In her three seasons there she won two leagues and three cups, and she played the first edition of the UEFA Women's Cup.

In 2003, she returned to Andalusia to play for Estudiantes Huelva. One year later she left Estudiantes for newly promoted Sevilla FC, which was the championship's runner-up in 2006. In 2007, she left Sevilla for Apolo Properties, a second-tier team with an ambitious project. However, it wasn't promoted and for the next season Fuentes returned to the top league in newly promoted FC Barcelona.

After two years in Barcelona, Fuentes returned to Atlético Málaga in 2010. When Málaga was relegated in 2012 she returned to Barcelona to play for another newly promoted team, Levante Las Planas.

== International career ==
Fuentes started to play for the Spain in 1997, just in time to be called up for the 1997 European Championship, Spain's first appearance in a final tournament. She played three of Spain's four games, always entering in the second half. She remained in the national team for five more years, making her last appearances in the 2003 World Cup qualifiers, while she played for Levante UD.

In 2012–13 she was one of three remaining active players of the 1997 Euro squad, along with Levante UD's Maider Castillo and RCD Espanyol's Vanesa Gimbert.
