= 2001–02 Superliga Femenina =

Superliga
- Season: 2001–02
- Dates: 23 September 2001 – 5 May 2002
- Champions: Levante (3rd title)
- UEFA Cup: Levante
- Matches: 110
- Goals: 502 (4.56 per match)

The 2001–02 Superliga Femenina season was the 14th edition of the top category of the Spanish women's football championship, and the first one under such name. Marking the reunification of the league six years after the dissolution of the old División de Honor, it was contested by eleven teams and it ran from 23 September 2001 to 5 May 2002.

Defending champion Levante won its third title with a 6 points advantage over CF Puebla. RCD Espanyol and CE Sabadell followed in the table at 14 and 15 points from the second position. There were no relegations following the end of the season.

== Teams and locations ==
Team	Location
Espanyol	Barcelona
Estudiantes	Huelva
Híspalis	Seville
Levante	Valencia
Nuestra Señora de Belén	Burgos
Nuestra Señora de La Antigua	Mérida
Oviedo Moderno	Oviedo
Pozuelo de Alarcón	Pozuelo de Alarcón
Puebla	Puebla de la Calzada
Sabadell	Sabadell
Torrejón	Torrejón de Ardoz

== League table ==
Pos	Team	Pld	W	D	L	GF	GA	GD	Pts	Qualification
1	Levante	20	19	0	1	109	12	+97	57	Qualification to UEFA Cup
2	Puebla	20	17	0	3	69	26	+43	51	
3	Espanyol	20	12	1	7	44	23	+21	37	
4	Sabadell	20	11	3	6	52	35	+17	36	
5	Estudiantes	20	10	2	8	53	49	+4	32	
6	Nuestra Señora de Belén	20	10	1	9	27	41	−14	31	
7	Torrejón	20	9	0	11	44	45	−1	27	
8	Pozuelo de Alarcón	20	5	4	11	39	49	−10	19	
9	Híspalis	20	4	2	14	30	74	−44	14	
10	Oviedo Moderno	20	3	3	14	21	65	−44	12	
11	Nuestra Señora de La Antigua	20	1	2	17	14	83	−69	5	

Source: Arquero Arba
Rules for classification: 1) Points; 2) Head-to-head points; 3) Head-to-head goal difference; 4) Goal difference; 5) Goals scored.

== Results ==
Home \ Away	ESP	EST	HIS	LEV	NSB	NSA	OVI	POZ	PUE	SAB	TOR
Espanyol	—	3–1	6–0	2–1	0–1	2–0	3–2	2–0	3–1	0–1	2–3
Estudiantes	3–2	—	2–0	1–4	4–0	7–3	4–1	4–0	1–6	3–3	3–0
Híspalis	0–5	2–4	—	0–11	1–0	5–1	5–1	2–4	2–3	2–4	3–7
Levante	4–1	7–1	8–0	—	9–0	7–0	13–1	7–2	3–0	5–0	3–1
Nuestra Señora de Belén	0–1	3–1	2–0	0–8	—	4–2	2–1	2–1	1–7	0–0	1–2
Nuestra Señora de La Antigua	0–5	1–3	2–2	0–7	0–3	—	1–2	0–0	0–3	0–7	0–6
Oviedo Moderno	1–1	2–2	4–2	0–3	0–1	0–1	—	2–1	1–6	1–3	0–2
Pozuelo de Alarcón	0–1	3–2	0–0	2–5	4–2	7–1	1–1	—	2–3	3–5	5–1
Puebla	3–1	4–1	2–1	0–3	5–0	5–1	5–1	3–2	—	4–0	3–1
Sabadell	2–1	4–1	4–0	1–3	1–2	2–0	7–1	3–3	0–2	—	3–1
Torrejón	0–1	1–5	0–1	1–5	0–2	7–1	5–1	1–0	2–4	3–2	—

Source: Arquero Arba
Legend: Blue = home team win; Yellow = draw; Red = away team win.

== See also ==
- 2002 Copa de la Reina de Fútbol
