= 2000 Copa de la Reina de Fútbol =

Tournament details
- Country: Spain

The 2000 Copa de la Reina de Fútbol was the 18th edition of the main Spanish women's football cup. It was played between 23 April and 25 June 2000 and Levante won its first title ever.

== Bracket ==
Preliminary round
Madrid Oeste	2	1	3
Pozuelo de Alarcón	1	5	6
Espanyol	1	3	4
L'Estartit (a)	4	0	4
Estudiantes	0	1	1
Híspalis	2	2	4
Eibartarrak	2	1	3
Sondika (a)	3	0	3

Quarter-finals
Pozuelo de Alarcón	4	1	5
Torrejón	1	3	4
L'Estartit	2	0	2
Levante	4	4	8
Híspalis	1	1	2
Irex Puebla	3	6	9
Sondika	0	2	2
Lagunak	2	1	3

Semi-finals
Pozuelo de Alarcón	1	1	2
Levante	5	8	13
Irex Puebla	2	0	2
Lagunak	0	3	3

Final
Levante	3
Lagunak	0
