= CF Pozuelo de Alarcón Femenino =

Spanish football club

Pozuelo de Alarcón
- Full name: Club de Fútbol Pozuelo de Alarcón Femenino
- Founded: 1995
- Ground: Valle de las Cañas; Pozuelo de Alarcón, Community of Madrid
- Capacity: 2,000
- League: Segunda División
- 2015–16: 11th – Group 5
- Website: http://www.cfpozuelo.com/pnfg/NPcd/NFG_POR_Noticias?cod_primaria=3000181&Sch_titulo=&Sch_Fecha_Desde=&Sch_Fecha_Hasta=&Sch_cuerpo=&Sch_area=13&groovybtn12=%A0Buscar%A0
| Home colours | Away colours |

CF Pozuelo de Alarcón Femenino is the women's football team of CF Pozuelo de Alarcón, currently playing in Spain's second level, Segunda División.

== History ==
Founded in 1995, Pozuelo was a founding member of the unified Superliga Femenina in 2001. After spending four seasons in the bottom half of the table, it was relegated in 2005. The team was back in top-flight for the 2008–09 season, but could not avoid relegation.

== Season by season ==
| Season | Division | Place | Copa de la Reina |
|---|---|---|---|
| 1999–00 | 1ª | 3rd | Semifinalist |
| 2000–01 | 1ª | 1st/SF | Semifinalist |
| 2001–02 | 1ª | 8th | Semifinalist |
| 2002–03 | 1ª | 11th | |
| 2003–04 | 1ª | 10th | |
| 2004–05 | 1ª | 13th | |
| 2005–06 | 2ª | 11th | |
| 2006–07 | 2ª | 4th | |
| 2007–08 | 2ª | 1st | |
| 2008–09 | 1ª | 16th | |
| 2009–10 | 2ª | 3rd | |
| 2010–11 | 2ª | 9th | |
| 2011–12 | 2ª | 4th | |
| 2012–13 | 2ª | 2nd | |
| 2013–14 | 2ª | 7th | |

| Season | Division | Place | Copa de la Reina |
|---|---|---|---|
| 2014–15 | 2ª | 5th | |
| 2015–16 | 2ª | 11th | |
| 2016–17 | 2ª | 11th | |
| 2017–18 | 2ª | 6th | |
| 2018–19 | 2ª | 4th (Note: The team qualified to move up to the new Primera División B but remained in the second tier of the system due to its creation.) | |
| 2019–20 | 2ªP | 15th | |
| 2020–21 | 2ªP | | |

== Former internationals ==
- Brazil: Milene Domingues
- Spain: Adriana Martín, Silvia Zarza, Estela Fernández, Sonia Bermúdez, Claudia Zornoza, Alba Mellado, Alicia Gómez, Sonia Prim
- Morocco: Zineb Rechiche
