= Susana Guerrero =

Spanish footballer (born 1980)

Personal information
- Full name: Susana Guerrero Pontivero
- Date of birth: 10 May 1980 (age 46)
- Place of birth: Sevilla, Spain
- Height: 1.62 m (5 ft 4 in)
- Position: Defender

Senior career*
Years	Team	Apps	(Gls)
1999–2003	Puebla		
2003–2004	Sabadell		
2004–2007	Levante		
2007–2009	Atlético Madrid		

International career
2000–2004	Spain	8	(0)
- * Club domestic league appearances and goals

Susana Guerrero Pontivero (born in Sevilla, 1980) is a Spanish former football defender. She played for Club Puebla, CE Sabadell, Levante UD and Atlético Madrid in the Spanish Superleague.

She was a member of the Spanish national team.

== Titles ==
- 1 Spanish league (2000)
