= Kátia Cilene =

Brazilian footballer

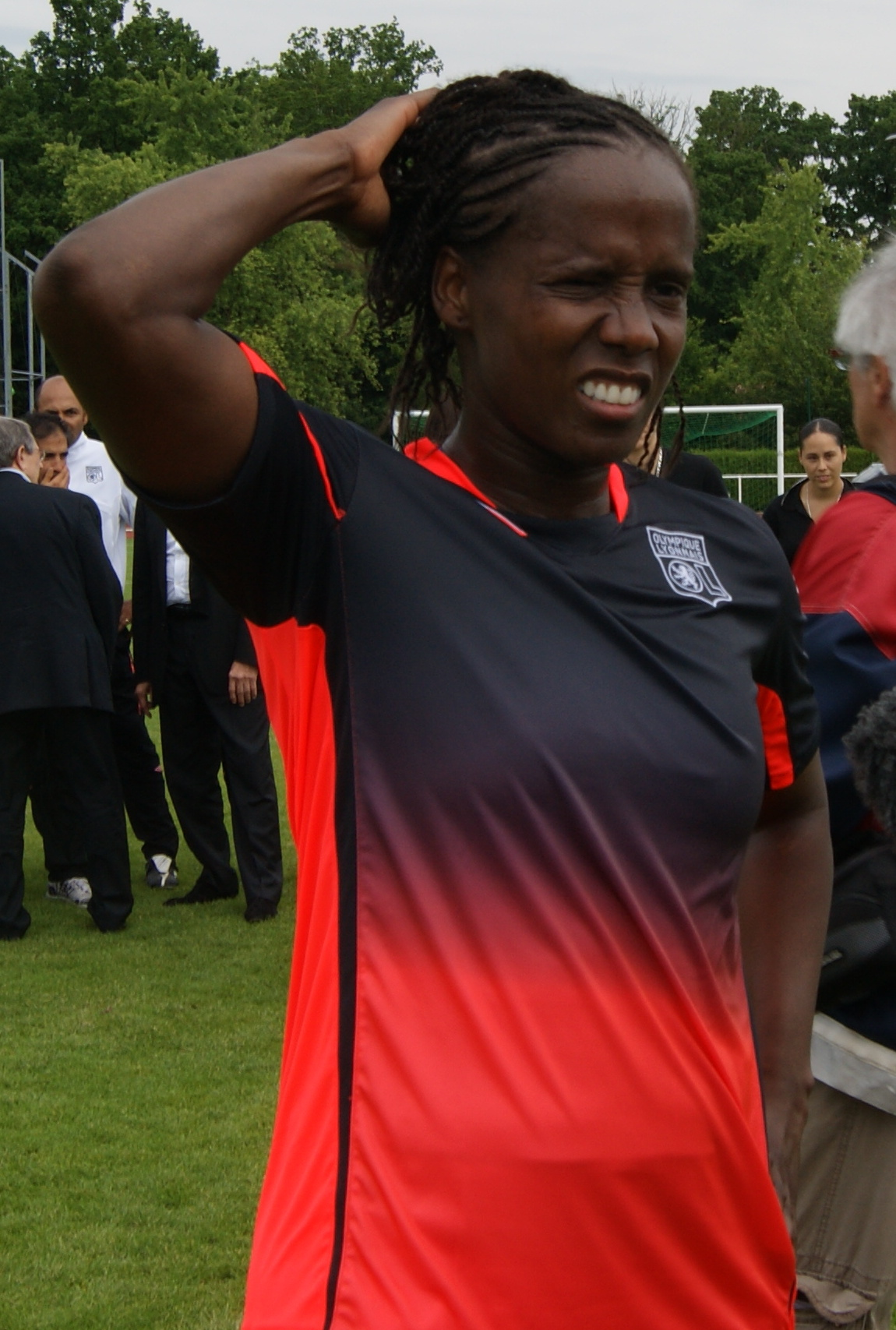

Personal information
- Full name: Kátia Cilene Teixeira da Silva
- Date of birth: 18 February 1977 (age 49)
- Place of birth: Rio de Janeiro, Brazil
- Height: 1.72 m (5 ft 8 in)
- Position: Striker

Senior career*
Years	Team	Apps	(Gls)
1994–1996	Vasco da Gama		
1996	Saad		
1997–2000	São Paulo		
2001–2003	San Jose CyberRays	59	(27)
2005	Estudiantes Huelva		
2005–2006	Levante		
2007–2010	Olympique Lyonnais	58	(57)
2010–2011	Paris Saint-Germain	21	(12)
2011–2013	Zorky Krasnogorsk	13	(3)
2013	Sundsvalls DFF	12	(1)
2014	Botafogo	3	(0)

International career^{‡}
1995–2007	Brazil	32	(27)
- * Club domestic league appearances and goals as of 15 October 2008 ‡ National team caps and goals as of 15 October 2008

Kátia Cilene Teixeira da Silva (born 18 February 1977), known simply as Kátia Cilene, is a Brazilian former footballer.

== Career ==
A former track and field star who finished as high as fifth in the heptathlon at the South American championships, Kátia Cilene is a veteran of three World Cups and two Olympic games. She began her international career as a key member of the Brazilian team in the 1995 Women's World Cup in Sweden, then played all five of her country's matches in the Atlanta Olympics. Her outstanding play and two goals at the 1999 Women's World Cup drew rave reviews and in 2000 she finished fourth in scoring at the Sydney Olympics.

Kátia Cilene spent five seasons in the Brazilian Women's League and ranked as the No.1 goal scorer in each of them. In 1997 she scored 34 goals as the newly formed São Paulo FC won the Campeonato Paulista de Futebol Feminino. With the launch of the WUSA in 2001, Katia was given the opportunity to take her game to an even higher level and she signed with the San Jose CyberRays. That first season she played well and scored seven goals. In 2002, she improved to score 15 goals. Her goals plus her five assists also made her the leading overall point scorer with 35.

=== Spain ===
In February 2005, Kátia Cilene arrived in Spain to play for Estudiantes Huelva. She transferred to Levante UD in May 2005 to play in the post-season 2005 Copa de la Reina de Fútbol, scoring two goals in five games to help her new club retain the trophy. She then agreed a deal to remain with Levante for the 2005–06 Superliga Femenina season.

=== France ===
Kátia Cilene moved to France's Olympique Lyonnais Féminin in January 2007, scoring 57 goals in 58 league matches. In summer 2010 she signed for Paris Saint-Germain Féminines.

=== Later career ===
After spending five years in the Division 1 Féminine in 2011 she moved to the Russian Championship where she played for Zorky Krasnogorsk. She played for Sundsvalls DFF in 2013.

Olympic medal record

FIFA Women's World Cup
Silver medal – second place	2007 China	Team
Bronze medal – third place	1999 United States	Team

Pan American Games - Women's Football
Gold medal – first place	2007 Rio de Janeiro	Team competition

=== International career ===
Kátia Cilene was frequently part of the Brazil women's national football team from 1995 to 2007. She went to three World Cups, finishing in second place in 2007 and third in 1999, as well as being in the quarter-finalist's squad from 2003. While she played in the 2000 Summer Olympics, finishing fourth, Kátia was left out of the team that won an Olympic silver in 2004 due to a knee injury. Kátia retired from the national team after the 2007 Pan American Games in her hometown of Rio de Janeiro, where Brazil won the gold.

== International goals ==
No.	Date	Venue	Opponent	Score	Result	Competition
1.	23 July 1996	Birmingham, United States	Japan	1–0	2–0	1996 Summer Olympics
2.	6 March 1998	Mar del Plata, Argentina	Venezuela	?–0	14–0	1998 South American Women's Football Championship
3.	6 March 1998	Mar del Plata, Argentina	Venezuela	?–0	14–0	1998 South American Women's Football Championship
4.	6 March 1998	Mar del Plata, Argentina	Venezuela	?–0	14–0	1998 South American Women's Football Championship
5.	6 March 1998	Mar del Plata, Argentina	Venezuela	?–0	14–0	1998 South American Women's Football Championship
6.	19 June 1999	East Rutherford, United States	Mexico	4–1	7–1	1999 FIFA Women's World Cup
7.	27 June 1999	Landover, United States	Germany	1–1	3–3	1999 FIFA Women's World Cup
8.	23 June 2000	Hershey, United States	Costa Rica	4–0	8–0	2000 CONCACAF Women's Gold Cup
9.	25 June 2000	Louisville, United States	Trinidad and Tobago	1–0	11–0	2000 CONCACAF Women's Gold Cup
10.	25 June 2000	Louisville, United States	Trinidad and Tobago	4–0	11–0	2000 CONCACAF Women's Gold Cup
11.	25 June 2000	Louisville, United States	Trinidad and Tobago	7–0	11–0	2000 CONCACAF Women's Gold Cup
12.	25 June 2000	Louisville, United States	Trinidad and Tobago	8–0	11–0	2000 CONCACAF Women's Gold Cup
13.	25 June 2000	Louisville, United States	Trinidad and Tobago	10–0	11–0	2000 CONCACAF Women's Gold Cup
14.	25 June 2000	Louisville, United States	Trinidad and Tobago	11–0	11–0	2000 CONCACAF Women's Gold Cup
15.	1 July 2000	Louisville, United States	China	1–1	3–2 (a.e.t.)	2000 CONCACAF Women's Gold Cup
16.	13 September 2000	Melbourne, Australia	Sweden	2–0	2–0	2000 Summer Olympics
17.	19 September 2000	Sydney, Australia	Australia	2–1	2–1	2000 Summer Olympics
18.	23 April 2003	Lima, Peru	Argentina	1–0	3–2	2003 South American Women's Football Championship
19.	27 April 2003	Lima, Peru	Colombia	6–0	12–0	2003 South American Women's Football Championship
20.	27 April 2003	Lima, Peru	Colombia	7–0	12–0	2003 South American Women's Football Championship
21.	27 April 2003	Lima, Peru	Colombia	9–0	12–0	2003 South American Women's Football Championship
22.	27 April 2003	Lima, Peru	Colombia	11–0	12–0	2003 South American Women's Football Championship
23.	27 April 2003	Lima, Peru	Colombia	12–0	12–0	2003 South American Women's Football Championship
24.	21 September 2003	Washington, D.C., United States	South Korea	2–0	3–0	2003 FIFA Women's World Cup
25.	21 September 2003	Washington, D.C., United States	South Korea	3–0	3–0	2003 FIFA Women's World Cup
26.	24 September 2003	Washington, D.C., United States	Norway	4–1	4–1	2003 FIFA Women's World Cup
27.	27 September 2003	Washington, D.C., United States	France	1–0	1–1	2003 FIFA Women's World Cup
28.	14 July 2007	Rio de Janeiro, Brazil	Jamaica	1–0	5–0	2007 Pan American Games
29.	14 July 2007	Rio de Janeiro, Brazil	Jamaica	3–0	5–0	2007 Pan American Games
