= CD Nuestra Señora de Belén =

Spanish football club

- Full name: Club Deportivo Nuestra Señora de Belén
- Founded: 1990
- Ground: José Manuel Sedano, Burgos
- Chairman: Carolina Goicoechea
- Manager: Julián Grijalva
- League: Segunda División
- 2014-15: Segunda División - Gr. 2, 11th
- Website: http://www.clubnsb.com/
Home colours

Club Deportivo Nuestra Señora de Belén, also known as BigMat Fontecha for sponsorship reasons, is a Spanish women's football club from Burgos.

== History ==
Originally established in 1990 as Rayo Burgalés in 1990, it took its current name in 1997. It was one of the eleven founding members of the Superliga Femenina in 2001, taking part in three seasons before being relegated in 2005. Since then it was always played in the second tier, except on the 2013–14, when the club claimed the Regional League title.

On 4 June 2019, Nuestra Señora de Belén agreed an affiliation agreement with men's club Burgos CF.

== Season by season ==
Season	Division	Pos.	Copa de la Reina
1997/98	1ª (Gr. 2)	4th	
1998/99	1ª (Gr. 2)	5th	
1999/00	1ª (Gr. 2)	4th	
2000/01	1ª (Gr. 2)	3rd	First round
2001/02	1ª	6th	First round
2002/03	1ª	10th	First round
2003/04	1ª	13th	
2004/05	1ª	14th	
2005/06	2ª	2nd	
2006/07	2ª	10th	
2007/08	2ª	8th	
2008/09	2ª	5th	

Season	Division	Place	Copa de la Reina
2009/10	2ª	9th	
2010/11	2ª	5th	
2011/12	2ª	8th	
2012/13	2ª	12th	
2013/14	1ª Reg.	1st	
2014/15	2ª	11th	
2015/16	2ª	7th	
2016/17	2ª	11th	
2017/18	2ª	11th	
2018/19	2ª	14th (Note: Due to the creation of the new Primera División B, the team remained in the same league but it became the third level.)	
2019/20	2ª		
