= Nkada =

Nkada is a surname. Notable people with the surname include:

- Agnès Nkada (born 1995), Cameroonian footballer
- Timothé Nkada (born 1999), French footballer
