= 2001 Copa de la Reina de Fútbol =

Spanish women's football cup

Tournament details
- Country: Spain

The 2001 Copa de la Reina de Fútbol was the 19th edition of the main Spanish women's football cup. It was played between 13 May and 24 June 2001 and Levante won its second title.

== Bracket ==
Preliminary round
Lagunak	3	1	4
Oiartzun	0	3	3
Híspalis	2	5	7
San Roque	1	4	5
Nuestra Señora de Belén	0	1	1
Pozuelo de Alarcón	3	3	6
Espanyol	5	2	7
Barcelona	3	1	4

Quarter-finals
Eibartarrak	0	1	1
Lagunak	2	2	4
Híspalis	1	1	2
Irex Puebla	2	5	7
Torrejón	4	1	5
Pozuelo de Alarcón (a)	2	3	5
Espanyol	0	1	1
Levante	2	6	8

Semi-finals
Lagunak	1	1	2
Irex Puebla	0	4	4
Pozuelo de Alarcón	1	0	1
Levante	3	5	8

Final
Levante	5
Irex Puebla	1
