= 1993 Copa de la Reina de Fútbol =

Tournament details
- Country: Spain

The 1993 Copa de S.M. la Reina de Fútbol was the 13th edition of Spain's women's football national cup. It was contested by 27 teams, and ran from 2 May to 26 June 1993. Añorga KKE defeated defending champion CD Oroquieta Villaverde in the final, held in Getafe, to win its third cup in four years.

== Qualifying rounds ==
=== First preliminary round ===
| Equipo Local Ida | Resultado | Equipo Visitante Ida | Ida | Vuelta |
|---|---|---|---|---|
| Eibartarrak | 10 - 4 | Bilbao | 5 - 1 | 5 - 3 |
| Sondika | 4 - 2 | Anaitasuna | 3 - 1 | 1 - 1 |
| Corellano | 0 - 18 | Añorga | 0 - 9 | 0 - 9 |
| Oiartzun | 14 - 0 | Trofeo La Amistad | 0 - 9 | 0 - 9 |
| Espanyol | 5 - 2 | Amics del Marítim | 4 - 1 | 1 - 1 |
| Port de Castelló | 9 - 4 | Tossa | 4 - 2 | 5 - 2 |
| Tradehi | 8 - 5 | Guillén Lafuerza | 4 - 2 | 4 - 3 |
| León | 3 - 0 | Distrito 20 | 1 - 0 | 2 - 0 |
| Llers | 5 - 4 | Barcelona | 4 - 1 | 1 - 3 |
| Sabadell | 20 - 0 | Los Silos | 10 - 0 | 10 - 0 |
| Lagunak | 12 - 1 | Adiskideak | 4 - 0 | 8 - 1 |
| Torroella | 7 - 6 | Gloria | 5 - 4 | 2 - 2 |
| Atlético Málaga | 6 - 2 | Atlético Puerta Blanca | 4 - 2 | 2 - 0 |

=== Second preliminary round ===
| Equipo Local Ida | Resultado | Equipo Visitante Ida | Ida | Vuelta |
|---|---|---|---|---|
| Eibartarrak | 2 - 8 | Sondika | 1 - 3 | 1 - 5 |
| Añorga | 2 - 1 | Oiartzun | 1 - 0 | 1 - 1 |
| Espanyol | 6 - 8 | Port de Castelló | 2 - 3 | 4 - 5 |
| Tradehi | 2 - 6 | León | 2 - 2 | 0 - 4 |
| Llers | 2 - 7 | Sabadell | 2 - 1 | 0 - 6 |
| Lagunak | 4 - 8 | Torroella | 3 - 2 | 1 - 6 |
| Oroquieta Villaverde | Walkover | La Chimenea |
| Atlético Málaga | Bye |

== Final rounds ==
Quarterfinals
1 | Sondika | 0 | 0 | 0
8 | Añorga | 1 | 2 | 3
4 | Port de Castelló | 4 | 1 | 5
5 | León | 4 | 2 | 6
2 | Sabadell | 8 | 3 | 11
7 | Torroella | 3 | 3 | 6
3 | Oroquieta Villaverde | 2 | 0 | 2
6 | Atlético Málaga | 0 | 0 | 0

Semifinals
Añorga | 5 | 4 | 9
León | 0 | 2 | 2
Sabadell | 3 | 0 | 3
Oroquieta Villaverde | 4 | 1 | 5

Final
Añorga | 2
Oroquieta Villaverde | 1

1993 Copa de la Reina de Fútbol Champion
(Basque Country (autonomous community)) Añorga KKE
Third title
