= Olga Moreno =

Spanish footballer (born 1979)

Chola Moreno
Personal information
- Full name: Olga Moreno Peral
- Date of birth: 9 July 1979 (age 47)
- Place of birth: Barcelona, Spain
- Height: 1.54 m (5 ft 1 in)
- Position: Defender

Senior career*
Years	Team	Apps	(Gls)
- Barcelona
2001–2002	Espanyol		
2002–2003	Levante		
2003–2005	Sabadell		
2005–2010	Espanyol		
2010–2012	Sant Gabriel		

International career
1999–2002	Spain	11	(1)
- * Club domestic league appearances and goals

Olga Moreno Peral, also known as Chola, is a Spanish football defender, currently playing for CE Sant Gabriel in the Spanish First Division. She previously played for FC Barcelona, Levante UD, CE Sabadell and RCD Espanyol, winning the championship with the latter in 2006. With Levante she played the UEFA Women's Cup.

She was a member of the Spain women's national football team.. Her international debut came in a Euro qualifying match with the Netherlands on 12 December 1999 (and scored one goal), in Córdoba.

== Titles ==
- 1 Spanish League (2006)
- 3 Spanish Cup (2006, 2009, 2010)
