= Marta Mateos =

Spanish footballer (born 1984)

Personal information
- Full name: Marta Mateos Adsuara
- Date of birth: 16 October 1984 (age 42)
- Place of birth: Almenara, Castellón, Spain
- Height: 1.62 m (5 ft 4 in)
- Position: Striker

Senior career*
Years	Team	Apps	(Gls)
2000–2003	Villarreal CF		
2003–2006	Levante UD		
2006–2014	Valencia CF		
2014–2016	UD Aldaia CF		

International career
1998–2000	Spain	2	(0)
- * Club domestic league appearances and goals

Marta Mateos Adsuara (born 16 October 1984) is a Spanish former football striker who most recently played for UD Aldaia CF in Spain's Segunda División. She previously played for Levante UD and Valencia CF in the Primera División.

She ranked among the league's top scorers in the 2008-09 and 2009-10 seasons with 20 and 23 goals, respectively.

== Titles ==
- 2 national cups: 2004, 2005 (Levante)
