= 2007 Copa de la Reina de Fútbol =

Tournament details
- Country: Spain

The 2007 Copa de la Reina de Fútbol was the 25th edition of the main Spanish women's football cup. It was played between 3 and 30 June 2007 and Levante won its first title ever.

== Bracket ==
Quarter-finals
Híspalis	2	2	4
Atlético de Madrid	1	1	2
Athletic Club	1	1	2
Levante	1	4	5
Rayo Vallecano	1	2	3
Torrejón	1	0	1
Espanyol	4	2	6
Irex Puebla	0	2	2

Semi-finals
Híspalis	2	1	3
Levante	1	3	4
Rayo Vallecano	2	1	3
Espanyol	2	3	5

Final
Levante	3
Espanyol	1
