= Lily Niber-Lawrence =

Ghanaian footballer

Personal information
- Date of birth: 23 June 1997 (age 29)
- Position: Midfielder

Team information
- Current team: Juan Grande

Senior career*
Years	Team	Apps	(Gls)
2015–2019	Sekondi Hasaacas Ladies		
2019	Atlético Ouriense		
2019–2020	Extremadura	1	(0)
2020–	Juan Grande	0	(0)

International career^{‡}
2017–	Ghana	2	(0)
- * Club domestic league appearances and goals as of 29 September 2019 ‡ National team caps and goals as of 16 June 2019

Lily Niber-Lawrence (born 23 June 1997) is a Ghanaian footballer who plays as a midfielder for Spanish Primera Nacional club CD Juan Grande and the Ghana women's national team. She competed for Ghana at the 2018 Africa Women Cup of Nations, playing in one match.
