= 2003–04 Superliga Femenina =

Superliga
- Season: 2003–04
- Champions: Athletic Bilbao (2nd title)
- Relegated: Nuestra Señora de La Antigua
- UEFA Cup: Athletic Bilbao
- Matches: 182
- Goals: 791 (4.35 per match)

The 2003–04 Superliga season was the 16th since its establishment.

Athletic Bilbao repeated success and achieved their second title.

== Teams and locations ==
Team	Location
Athletic Bilbao	Bilbao
Espanyol	Barcelona
Estudiantes	Huelva
Híspalis	Seville
Lagunak	Barañáin
Levante	Valencia
Nuestra Señora de Belén	Burgos
Nuestra Señora de La Antigua	Mérida
Oviedo Moderno	Oviedo
Pozuelo de Alarcón	Pozuelo de Alarcón
Puebla	Puebla de la Calzada
Rayo Vallecano	Madrid
Sabadell	Sabadell
Torrejón	Torrejón de Ardoz

== League table ==
Pos	Team	Pld	W	D	L	GF	GA	GD	Pts	Qualification or relegation
1	Athletic Bilbao (C)	26	19	3	4	80	29	+51	60	Qualification for UEFA Women's Cup and Copa de la Reina
2	Sabadell	26	18	4	4	106	39	+67	58	Qualification for Copa de la Reina
3	Levante	26	18	4	4	75	19	+56	58	Qualification for Copa de la Reina
4	Puebla	26	17	2	7	65	36	+29	53	Qualification for Copa de la Reina
5	Torrejón	26	16	5	5	68	48	+20	53	
6	Estudiantes	26	14	5	7	81	49	+32	47	
7	Lagunak	26	13	2	11	49	37	+12	41	
8	Espanyol	26	12	2	12	64	67	−3	38	
9	Rayo Vallecano	26	12	1	13	51	53	−2	37	
10	Pozuelo de Alarcón	26	7	2	17	42	75	−33	23	
11	Oviedo Moderno	26	5	5	16	25	62	−37	20	
12	Híspalis	26	4	3	19	35	94	−59	15	
13	Nuestra Señora de Belén	26	4	3	19	30	92	−62	15	
14	Nuestra Señora de La Antigua (R)	26	1	3	22	20	91	−71	6	Relegation to Primera Nacional

Source: Arquero Arba
(C) Champions; (R) Relegated

== Results ==
Home \ Away	ATH	ESP	EST	HIS	LAG	LEV	NSA	NSB	OVI	POZ	PUE	RAY	SAB	TOR
Athletic Bilbao	—	5–0	3–1	6–0	4–2	1–1	7–0	8–2	4–1	5–2	2–1	3–0	2–1	0–2
Espanyol	4–5	—	2–1	6–2	3–1	0–1	3–1	5–0	4–1	2–4	4–3	1–2	4–6	4–4
Estudiantes	4–2	3–1	—	7–1	2–4	3–1	3–3	10–0	1–1	4–0	3–2	2–2	2–7	3–3
Híspalis	0–5	0–1	5–7	—	0–3	0–4	3–1	4–2	1–1	6–1	0–2	0–3	1–7	1–5
Lagunak	0–1	4–2	2–1	6–1	—	0–1	1–1	1–2	2–1	2–0	4–0	3–2	1–3	1–2
Levante	0–0	2–0	4–1	8–0	3–2	—	4–0	6–0	7–1	3–1	3–0	5–0	1–1	7–1
Nuestra Señora de La Antigua	1–3	0–3	1–9	1–3	0–3	0–4	—	2–2	0–1	2–0	1–4	0–1	1–5	2–4
Nuestra Señora de Belén	0–3	4–1	0–4	0–0	0–3	0–1	3–1	—	2–3	2–2	0–3	0–7	1–3	1–5
Oviedo Moderno	0–1	1–3	0–0	1–1	0–1	0–3	4–1	2–1	—	0–1	1–2	0–1	1–4	2–0
Pozuelo de Alarcón	0–3	1–3	2–3	1–0	2–0	2–3	5–0	2–5	2–1	—	3–4	1–3	1–8	3–4
Puebla	2–1	2–2	1–0	5–1	0–2	0–0	4–0	4–1	7–0	2–0	—	4–1	3–2	3–0
Rayo Vallecano	1–3	2–3	1–4	1–0	1–2	2–1	3–1	3–0	3–1	2–3	1–3	—	2–6	1–2
Sabadell	1–1	6–2	1–2	6–4	3–0	2–1	5–1	8–1	9–0	2–2	2–3	4–0	—	3–0
Torrejón	3–2	6–1	1–0	5–2	1–1	2–1	5–0	2–1	1–1	6–1	2–1	1–5	1–1	—

Source: Arquero Arba
Legend: Blue = home team win; Yellow = draw; Red = away team win.

== See also ==
- 2004 Copa de la Reina de Fútbol
