= Cristina Estévez =

Spanish footballer (born 1986)

Personal information
- Full name: Cristina Estévez Lores
- Date of birth: 5 June 1986 (age 40)
- Place of birth: Novales, Spain
- Position: Goalkeeper

Senior career*
Years	Team	Apps	(Gls)
2004–2006	Levante		
2006–2010	Valencia		
2010–2012	Prainsa Zaragoza		
2012–2014	Mislata		
2014–2015	Ciutat de Torrent		

International career
2008	Spain		
- * Club domestic league appearances and goals

Cristina Estévez Lores (born 5 June 1986), commonly known as Xurru, is a Spanish football goalkeeper. She played for Levante UD, Valencia CF and Prainsa Zaragoza in Primera División, and she was a reserve goalkeeper for Spain in the 2009 European Championship qualifying.
