= AD Peña Nuestra Señora de la Antigua =

Spanish football club

Ntra. Sra. de la Antigua
- Full name: Asociación Deportiva Peña Nuestra Señora de la Antigua
- Dissolved: 2011
- Ground: Mérida
- Capacity: 5,000

Asociación Deportiva Peña Nuestra Señora de la Antigua, also known as Corderex La Antigua for sponsorship reasons, was a Spanish women's football club from Mérida settled in the city's Nuestra Señora de la Antigua district.

Nuestra Señora de la Antigua was a founding member of the unified national championship in 2002 and played its three first seasons, always ending in the last position of the table. With the introduction of promotions in 2004, the club was relegated to second-tier Primera Nacional. In 2011 it was relegated to the third tier and disbanded.

== Season by season ==
Season	Division	Place	Copa de la Reina
1999/00	1ª (Gr. 4)	7th	
2000/01	1ª (Gr. 4)	8th	
2001/02	1ª	11th	First round
2002/03	1ª	12th	
2003/04	1ª	14th	
2004/05	2ª (Gr. 5)	1st	
2005/06	2ª (Gr. 5)	9th	
2006/07	2ª (Gr. 5)	(R)	
2007–10	Regional	—	
2010/11	2ª (Gr. 5)	14th	

== Former internationals ==
- (Portugal) Edite Fernandes
