= Vanesa Gimbert =

Spanish footballer

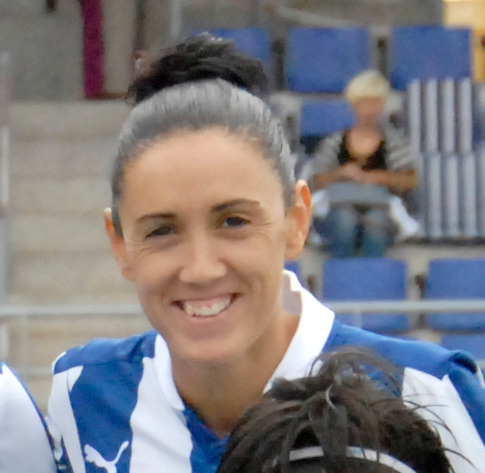
- Gimbert with Espanyol in 2012

Personal information
- Full name: Vanesa Gimbert Acosta
- Date of birth: 19 April 1980 (age 46)
- Place of birth: Bergara, Basque Country, Spain
- Height: 1.68 m (5 ft 6 in)
- Position: Defensive midfielder

Senior career*
Years	Team	Apps	(Gls)
1994–1999	Mondelia Montilla		
1999–2003	Levante		
2003–2004	Estudiantes Huelva		
2004–2007	Sevilla	24+	(9+)
2007–2010	Rayo Vallecano	61	(13)
2010–2013	Espanyol	88	(6)
2013–2022	Athletic Bilbao	231	(39)

International career
1997–2010	Spain	40	(6)
2012–2017	Basque Country	5	(0)
- * Club domestic league appearances and goals as of 22 October 2021

Vanesa Gimbert Acosta (born 19 April 1980) is a Spanish retired footballer who played as a defender or midfielder. She played for clubs including Levante, Sevilla, Rayo Vallecano, Espanyol and Athletic Bilbao in Spain's Primera División, retiring in 2022 aged 42.

== Career ==
Born in the Basque Country and raised partly in Andalusia, she previously played for RCD Espanyol, Levante UD, CFF Estudiantes, Sevilla and Rayo Vallecano. She won four league titles with Levante and Rayo (coming close to another with Sevilla) and five Copas de la Reina between her spells at those two clubs and Espanyol.

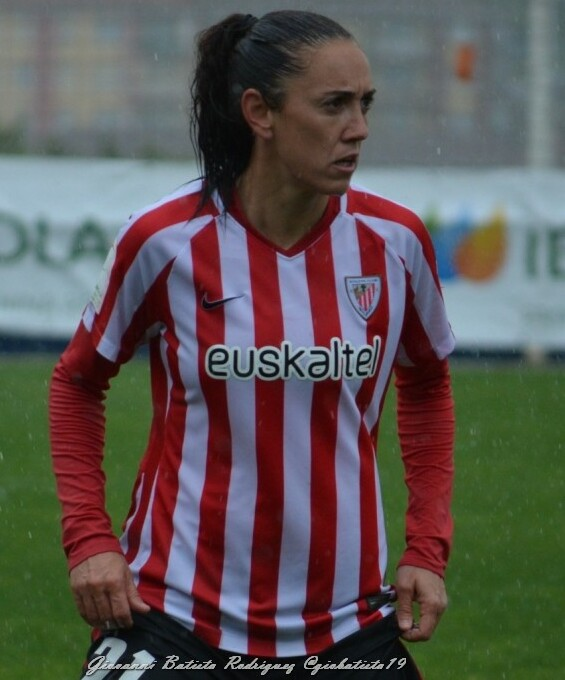
Gimbert playing for Athletic Club, 2017

In 2016, 36-year-old Gimbert won the league title with Athletic, then agreed to remain with the club for another year. Five years later (now aged 41, the oldest active player in the country) she was still playing regularly, including scoring both goals in a victory over Santa Teresa and agreed a further one-year contract in the summer of 2021. She retired one year later after nine years in Bilbao alongside teammate Erika Vázquez, who by coincidence was one of the opponents 22 years earlier when Gimbert won the first trophy of her career, the 2000 Copa de la Reina de Fútbol when Levante defeated Lagunak. Her statistics with Athletic included being its oldest debutant (aged 33), longest run of consecutive matches (86, completing the 90 minutes every time) and oldest player (aged 42).

Gimbert was a member of the Spain women's national football team from a young age, taking part at 17 in the 1997 European Championship. She was the team's captain in the 2009 European Championship qualifying.

=== International goals ===
- 1999 FIFA Women's World Cup play-off
  - 1 in Spain 4–1 Scotland (1998)
- 2001 Euro qualification
  - 1 in Netherlands 1–2 Spain (2000)
  - 1 in Spain 1–6 Denmark (2000)
- 2003 FIFA Women's World Cup qualification
  - 1 in Spain 6–1 Iceland (2001)
- 2007 FIFA Women's World Cup qualification
  - 1 in Spain 3–2 Belgium (2005)
- 2009 Euro qualification
  - 1 in Spain 4–1 Czech Republic (2008)

== Honours ==
=== Club ===
Levante

- Primera División: 2000–01, 2001–02
- Copa de la Reina: 2000, 2001, 2002

Rayo Vallecano

- Primera División: 2008–09, 2009–10
- Copa de la Reina: 2008

Espanyol

- Copa de la Reina: 2012

Athletic Bilbao

- Primera División: 2015–16
- Copa de la Reina: runner-up 2014
