= Erika Vázquez =

Spanish footballer

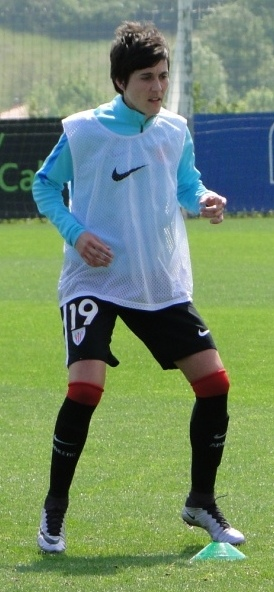
- by Giovanni Batista Rodriguez, 2016

Personal information
- Full name: Erika Vázquez Morales
- Date of birth: 16 February 1983 (age 43)
- Place of birth: Pamplona, Navarre, Spain
- Height: 1.65 m (5 ft 5 in)
- Position: Striker

Senior career*
Years	Team	Apps	(Gls)
1998–2004	Lagunak		
2004–2010	Athletic Bilbao	138	(115)
2010–2011	Espanyol	27	(22)
2011–2022	Athletic Bilbao	240	(125)

International career
- Spain U19
2003–2016	Spain	47	(7)
2007–	Basque Country	5	(1)
- * Club domestic league appearances and goals as of 17:38, 10 August 2022 (UTC)

Erika Vázquez Morales (born 16 February 1983), known simply as Erika, is a former Spanish footballer who played as a forward, mainly for Athletic Bilbao where she set club records for most appearances and goals. Between 2003 and 2016, she played for the Spain national team and has also played for the Basque Country national team.

== Club career ==
With 240 goals for the club in the Primera División (women) and 18 more in three UEFA Women's Champions League campaigns she is Athletic Bilbao's all-time top scorer and appearance maker, overtaking the mark of 413 in the latter count set by Eli Ibarra in 2022, a few months before retiring on 423 aged 39 (however, Ibarra won five league championships compared to three for Vázquez).

Her 17 seasons at Lezama was also the most time with the club for a female player across its 20-year history, notwithstanding the year she spent with Espanyol in the 2010–11 season in which the Catalan club finished runners-up in both the league and the Copa de la Reina – Vázquez never won that competition, losing in one earlier final with Lagunak as a teenager in 2000 (by coincidence, one of her opponents that day was Vanesa Gimbert who retired alongside her as a teammate in Bilbao 22 years later) and two subsequent finals with Athletic in 2012 and 2014.

== International career ==
She played for Spain since the 2005 UEFA Women's Championship qualification. In June 2013, national team coach Ignacio Quereda confirmed Erika as a member of his 23-player squad for the UEFA Women's Euro 2013 finals in Sweden. She was also part of Spain's squad at the 2015 FIFA Women's World Cup in Canada.

=== International goals ===
No.	Date	Venue	Opponent	Score	Result	Competition
1.	29 February 2004	La Forana, Alginet, Spain	Belgium	6–1	9–1	UEFA Women's Euro 2005 qualifying
2.	29 February 2004	La Forana, Alginet, Spain	Belgium	7–1	9–1	UEFA Women's Euro 2005 qualifying
3.	30 May 2007	Spartak Stadium, Bobruisk, Belarus	Belarus	1–0	3–0	UEFA Women's Euro 2009 qualifying
4.	3 May 2008	La Ciudad del Fútbol, Madrid, Spain	Belarus	1–0	6–1	UEFA Women's Euro 2009 qualifying
5.	3 May 2008	La Ciudad del Fútbol, Madrid, Spain	Belarus	3–1	6–1	UEFA Women's Euro 2009 qualifying
6.	28 May 2008	The Showgrounds, Newry, Northern Ireland	Northern Ireland	1–0	3–0	UEFA Women's Euro 2009 qualifying
7.	28 May 2008	The Showgrounds, Newry, Northern Ireland	Northern Ireland	2–0	3–0	UEFA Women's Euro 2009 qualifying

== Honours ==
Athletic Bilbao

- Primera División: 2004–05, 2006–07, 2015–16

Lagunak

- Primera Nacional (second tier): 2002–03
