= 2004 Copa de la Reina de Fútbol =

Tournament details
- Country: Spain

The 2004 Copa de S.M. La Reina de Fútbol was the 22nd edition of Spain's women's football national cup. The competition was shortened from previous editions' eight teams to just four and held in Burgos as a Final Four from 4 to 6 June 2004.

Levante UD defeated CFF Puebla in a penalty shootout in semifinals and defending champion CE Sabadell in extra time in the final to win its fourth cup in five years.

== Qualified teams ==
| Pos | Team | P | W | D | L | GF | GA | Pts |
|---|---|---|---|---|---|---|---|---|
| 1 | Athletic Club | 26 | 19 | 3 | 4 | 80 | 29 | 60 |
| 2 | Sabadell | 26 | 18 | 4 | 4 | 106 | 39 | 58 |
| 3 | Levante | 26 | 18 | 4 | 4 | 75 | 19 | 58 |
| 4 | Puebla | 26 | 17 | 2 | 7 | 65 | 36 | 53 |

== Results ==
=== Semifinals ===
June 4, 2004

| Sabadell (Catalonia) | 1 – 0 | (Basque Country (autonomous community)) Athletic Club |
|---|---|---|
| Mateos 27' | Report |

El Plantío, Burgos
June 4, 2004

| Levante (Valencian Community) | 2 – 2 (a.e.t.) | (Extremadura) Puebla |
|---|---|---|
| ? | Report | ? |
Penalties
| | 3 – 1 |

Briviesca

=== Final ===
June 6, 2004

| Levante (Valencian Community) | 3 – 1 (a.e.t.) | (Catalonia) Sabadell |
|---|---|---|
| Prieto 4', 92'; Castillo 95' | Report | Martín 42' |

Municipal de Anduva, Miranda del Ebro
