= 2008 Copa de la Reina de Fútbol =

Tournament details
- Country: Spain

The 2008 Copa de la Reina de Fútbol was the 26th edition of the main Spanish women's football cup. It was played between 1 and 29 June 2008 and Rayo Vallecano won its first title ever.

== Bracket ==
Quarter-finals
Torrejón	2	0	2
Levante	1	2	3
Atlético de Madrid	2	2	4
Irex Puebla	0	0	0
Prainsa Zaragoza	3	1	4
Espanyol	1	2	3
Rayo Vallecano	3	4	7
Athletic Club	2	2	4

Semi-finals
Atlético de Madrid	0	0	0
Levante	2	3	5
Prainsa Zaragoza	0	0	0
Rayo Vallecano	7	2	9

Final
Levante	2
Rayo Vallecano	3
