= Rosa Castillo (footballer) =

Spanish footballer (born 1974)

Personal information
- Full name: Rosa Castillo Varó
- Date of birth: 12 December 1974 (age 51)
- Place of birth: Barbate, Spain
- Height: 1.53 m (5 ft 0 in)
- Position: Midfielder

Senior career*
Years	Team	Apps	(Gls)
1994–1998	Híspalis		
1998–2009	Levante		

International career
	Spain	36	(3)
- * Club domestic league appearances and goals

Rosa Castillo Varó (born 12 December 1974) is a former Spanish footballer. She played throughout her career as a right winger for CD Híspalis and Levante UD with whom she won three leagues and six national cups. Since 2011 she is the coordinator of the latter.

She was a member of the Spain women's national football team, and played the 1997 European Championship.

International goals

- Torneig Internacional Ciutat de Tarragona
  - 1 in Spain 2–2 Poland (1993)
- 1995 UEFA Women's Championship
  - 1 in Spain 17–0 Slovenian (1994)
  - 1 in Roumania 2–2 Spain (1996)
