= Laura del Río =

Spanish footballer (born 1982)

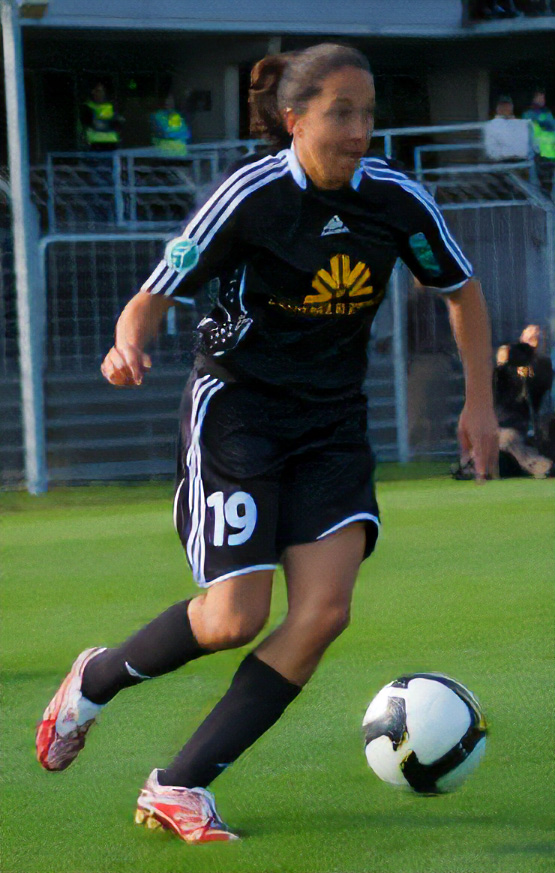
- Del Río playing for 1. FFC Frankfurt in 2009

Personal information
- Full name: Laura del Río García
- Date of birth: 5 February 1982 (age 44)
- Place of birth: Madrid, Spain
- Height: 1.62 m (5 ft 4 in)
- Position: Forward

Senior career*
Years	Team	Apps	(Gls)
1999–2000	Torrejón		
2000–2002	Levante		
2002–2004	Sabadell		
2004–2008	Levante		
2008–2009	Indiana	32	(34)
2009–2010	1. FFC Frankfurt	10	(6)
2010	Boston Breakers	21	(1)
2011	Philadelphia Independence	15	(2)
2012–2014	Bristol Academy	47	(14)
2015–2016	Washington Spirit	11	(0)
2016–2017	Tacón		
2017–2019	Madrid CFF	40	(4)

International career
	Spain U-19	25?	(45?)
	Spain	30	(14)

Managerial career
- 2019: Flat Earth
- * Club domestic league appearances and goals

Laura del Río García (born 5 February 1982) is a Spanish football manager and former player who played as a forward. She last managed men's club Flat Earth FC.

She used to play for Bristol Academy in England's FA WSL. Prior to that, she played for AD Torrejón, CE Sabadell and Levante UD in the Spanish Superleague, FC Indiana in the W-League, 1. FFC Frankfurt in the German Bundesliga, and Boston Breakers and Philadelphia Independence in the WPS. Del Río scored 14 for the senior Spain women's national football team, before a dispute with the coach caused her to quit the national team.

== Club career ==
Del Río began her career at AD Torrejón in 1999 before moving to Levante UD the following year. In her two seasons in Valencia she won two doubles as Levante cruised through the Superliga Femenina and the Copa de la Reina. Del Río subsequently spent two seasons at CE Sabadell and then returned to Levante, where she remained for the next four years, winning an additional League in 2008 and two more Cups.

In 2008, she left Levante to play abroad for the first time, playing in the W-League for FC Indiana. She scored 33 goals in her two years in the W-League, making it into the All-League team. In summer 2009 she signed for European powerhouse 1. FFC Frankfurt. Starting the season as a reserve, she made herself a place in the starting eleven for a few weeks after scoring in three consecutive games coming from the bench. Overall, she scored six goals in just ten matches in the Bundesliga, as she left Frankfurt in December to sign for Boston Breakers, marking her Women's Professional Soccer debut. For the 2011 season she transferred to Philadelphia Independence, with whom she reached the championship play-offs. In the final she missed the team's final penalty to finish runners-up.

Del Río joined English FA WSL club Bristol Academy in 2012. Under coach Mark Sampson the club finished second in the 2013 FA WSL and were losing finalists in the 2012–13 FA Women's Cup. In January 2015 Bristol confirmed that del Rio had left the club after scoring 14 goals in 47 games.

She returned to the United States, signing for National Women's Soccer League club Washington Spirit. She served two assists in 11 appearances in 2015, before her season was ended by injury. She also missed the entire 2016 season following surgery on her ankle. She continued her career in Spain, with ambitious Segunda División club CD Tacón, signing for Madrid CFF a year later.

== International career ==
Del Río was the top scorer of the 2000 Under-18 Euro, where Spain made it to the final for the first time.

For many years Del Río was a key player of Spain's national team, scoring 14 goals. Despite this she has not been called for the past few years following a clash with manager Ignacio Quereda.

=== International goals ===
#	Date	Venue	Opponent	Score	Result	Competition
1.	30 September 2001	Estadio Pinilla, Teruel	Iceland	1–0	6–1	2003 FIFA Women's World Cup qualifying
2.	30 September 2001	Estadio Pinilla, Teruel	Iceland	2–0	6–1	2003 FIFA Women's World Cup qualifying
3.	28 April 2002	Sánchez Canovas, Molina de Segura	Russia	2–0	2–1	2003 FIFA Women's World Cup qualifying
4.	26 March 2003	Oosterenkstadion, Zwolle	Netherlands	0–1	0–1	2005 UEFA Women's Championship qualifying
5.	29 February 2004	La Forana, Alginet	Macedonia	2–1	9–1	2005 UEFA Women's Championship qualifying
6.	29 February 2004	La Forana, Alginet	Macedonia	3–1	9–1	2005 UEFA Women's Championship qualifying
7.	29 February 2004	La Forana, Alginet	Macedonia	5–1	9–1	2005 UEFA Women's Championship qualifying
8.	29 February 2004	La Forana, Alginet	Macedonia	8–1	9–1	2005 UEFA Women's Championship qualifying
9.	29 February 2004	La Forana, Alginet	Macedonia	9–1	9–1	2005 UEFA Women's Championship qualifying
10.	10 April 2014	Estadio de Maspalomas, San Bartolomé de Tirajana	Finland	1–1	2–2	Torneo de Maspalomas
11.	29 September 2005	City Stadium, Kutno	Poland	0–1	3–2	2007 World Cup qualification
12.	29 September 2005	City Stadium, Kutno	Poland	0–2	3–2	2007 World Cup qualification
13.	22 April 2006	Stade Joseph Marien, Brussels	Belgium	0–3	2–4	2007 World Cup qualification
14.	16 February 2008	El Montecillo, Aranda de Duero	Northern Ireland	1–0	4–0	UEFA Women's Euro 2009 qualifying

== Managerial career ==
After her retirement, in August 2019 Del Río signed as head coach of Flat Earth FC becoming the first woman at the helm of a team in the Spanish fourth division. However, she was sacked in October, but she continued in the club's structure with the aim to develop a women's team.

== Honours ==
FC Indiana

- 2008 W-League Central Conference Championship
- 2009 W-League top scorer
- 2009 W-League All-League Team
- 2009 All-Central Conference Team
