= 2002–03 Superliga Femenina =

Superliga
- Season: 2002–03
- Champions: Athletic Bilbao (1st title)
- UEFA Cup: Athletic Bilbao
- Matches: 132
- Goals: 668 (5.06 per match)

The 2002–03 Superliga season was the 15th edition since the competition's establishment and the second one since its unification. It was contested by twelve teams, and it ran from 6 October 2002 to 27 April 2003. Debuting team Athletic Bilbao won its first championship, while defending champion Levante UD was the runner-up tied at points with the lionesses, and CF Puebla and CE Sabadell were 3rd and 4th respectively. CFF Estudiantes, AD Torrejón, RCD Espanyol and CF Oviedo Moderno also qualified for the 2003 Copa de la Reina. Like in the previous season, there were no relegations.

== Teams and locations ==
Team	Location
Athletic Bilbao	Bilbao
Espanyol	Barcelona
Estudiantes	Huelva
Híspalis	Seville
Levante	Valencia
Nuestra Señora de Belén	Burgos
Nuestra Señora de La Antigua	Mérida
Oviedo Moderno	Oviedo
Pozuelo de Alarcón	Pozuelo de Alarcón
Puebla	Puebla de la Calzada
Sabadell	Sabadell
Torrejón	Torrejón de Ardoz

== League table ==
Pos	Team	Pld	W	D	L	GF	GA	GD	Pts	Qualification
1	Athletic Bilbao	22	17	4	1	89	17	+72	55	Qualification for UEFA Women's Cup and Copa de la Reina
2	Levante	22	18	1	3	100	11	+89	55	Qualification for Copa de la Reina
3	Puebla	22	14	4	4	83	35	+48	46	Qualification for Copa de la Reina
4	Sabadell	22	13	3	6	75	38	+37	42	Qualification for Copa de la Reina
5	Estudiantes	22	12	2	8	63	41	+22	38	Qualification for Copa de la Reina
6	Torrejón	22	11	5	6	52	41	+11	38	Qualification for Copa de la Reina
7	Espanyol	22	10	5	7	67	44	+23	35	Qualification for Copa de la Reina
8	Oviedo Moderno	22	5	4	13	21	52	−31	19	Qualification for Copa de la Reina
9	Híspalis	22	5	1	16	36	93	−57	16	
10	Nuestra Señora de Belén	22	5	1	16	30	113	−83	16	
11	Pozuelo de Alarcón	22	3	3	16	36	77	−41	12	
12	Nuestra Señora de La Antigua	22	3	0	19	16	106	−90	9	

Source: Arquero Arba

== Results ==
Home \ Away	ATH	ESP	EST	HIS	LEV	NSB	NSA	OVI	POZ	PUE	SAB	TOR
Athletic Bilbao	—	4–1	4–1	5–0	1–1	9–0	10–0	3–0	5–1	5–1	5–2	6–1
Espanyol	1–1	—	4–4	2–0	0–3	7–1	8–0	2–1	2–2	3–0	1–3	3–6
Estudiantes	0–2	3–2	—	4–2	0–4	11–1	4–0	1–2	1–0	4–5	2–3	5–3
Híspalis	1–6	0–5	0–5	—	1–6	2–0	5–2	5–1	4–3	2–10	3–9	2–5
Levante	0–1	4–1	0–2	8–0	—	11–1	16–0	2–0	8–0	1–3	3–0	5–0
Nuestra Señora de Belén	0–7	0–10	4–1	3–2	0–6	—	4–3	2–2	4–1	2–6	0–4	2–3
Nuestra Señora de La Antigua	0–6	1–3	0–4	2–1	1–7	0–3	—	1–5	2–1	0–4	0–4	0–3
Oviedo Moderno	0–3	1–2	0–2	1–2	0–6	0–0	1–0	—	4–3	0–3	2–1	0–0
Pozuelo de Alarcón	0–2	2–7	2–2	2–2	0–6	4–1	2–3	3–0	—	1–5	1–7	1–4
Puebla	2–2	5–0	2–4	8–0	0–1	8–2	5–0	1–1	3–1	—	6–2	1–1
Sabadell	3–0	2–2	0–3	4–1	0–1	5–1	7–1	6–0	3–0	3–3	—	5–1
Torrejón	2–2	1–1	1–0	2–1	0–1	5–1	3–0	4–0	4–1	1–2	2–2	—

Source: Arquero Arba
Legend: Blue = home team win; Yellow = draw; Red = away team win.

== See also ==
- 2003 Copa de la Reina
