= 2003 Copa de la Reina de Fútbol =

Tournament details
- Country: Spain

The 2003 Copa de S.M. la Reina de Fútbol was the 21st edition of Spain's women's football national cup, and took place from 18 May to 29 June 2003.

CE Sabadell, which was celebrating its centennial and was entrusted the final's hosting, became the 11th Copa de la Reina champion by defeating CD Híspalis, Levante UD (which had won the previous three editions) and finally CFF Estudiantes. Superliga champion Athletic Club was defeated by Estudiantes in the first round.

== Results ==
=== First round ===
Team 1	Agg.	Team 2	1st leg	2nd leg
Oviedo Moderno (Asturias)	1-11	(Community of Madrid) Torrejón	0–5	1-6
AD Peña Nuestra Señora de la Antigua (Extremadura)		(Andalusia) Híspalis		3-6
Espanyol (Catalonia)	10–1	(Catalonia) Nuestra Señora de Belén	6–0	4–1

=== Quarter-finals ===
Team 1	Agg.	Team 2	1st leg	2nd leg
Torrejón (Community of Madrid)	3–5	(Valencian Community) Levante	0–2	3–3
Sabadell (Catalonia)	11–1	(Andalusia) Híspalis	8–0	3–1
Puebla (Extremadura)	5–4	(Catalonia) Espanyol	4–1	1–3
Estudiantes (Andalusia)	6–5	(Basque Country (autonomous community)) Athletic Club	1–0	5–5

=== Semifinals ===
Team 1	Agg.	Team 2	1st leg	2nd leg
Levante (Valencian Community)	2–5	(Catalonia) Sabadell	2–2	0–3
Puebla (Extremadura)	3–3	(Andalusia) Estudiantes	0–0	3–3

=== Final ===
29 June 2003

Sabadell (Catalonia)	3–1	(Andalusia) Estudiantes
Del Río 10', 45'; Pérez 18'	Report	Benito 58'

Nova Creu Alta, Sabadell
Referee: Herráiz
