= Agnès Nkada =

Cameroonian footballer

Personal information
- Full name: Agnès Marie Claire Nkada
- Date of birth: 12 March 1995 (age 31)
- Place of birth: Akonolinga, Cameroon
- Position: Forward

Team information
- Current team: Extremadura
- Number: 15

Senior career*
Years	Team	Apps	(Gls)
2016–2017	Lorient	16	(7)
2017–2018	Angers	19	(8)
2019–	Extremadura	1	(0)

International career
2016–	Cameroon	3	(0)
- * Club domestic league appearances and goals as of 29 September 2019

Agnès Marie Claire Nkada (born 12 March 1995) is a Cameroonian footballer who plays as a forward for Spanish Primera Nacional club Extremadura UD and the Cameroon women's national team.

== Club career ==
Nkada joined Spanish Primera Nacional club Extremadura UD on 28 September 2019. In 2020, she joined PM Friol.
