= 2006 Copa de la Reina de Fútbol =

Tournament details
- Country: Spain

The Copa de Su Majestad La Reina de Fútbol was the 24th edition of Spain's women's football national cup, running from May 7 to June 11, 2006. The final took place in Valencia, in Levante UD's ground, and confronted Superliga champion RCD Espanyol and underdog SD Lagunak, which had qualified because Estudiantes folded following the end of the Superliga campaign. Espanyol won its third cup and followed the steps of Atlético Málaga, CD Oroquieta and Levante UD to win the double by beating Lagunak on penalties after a 2–2 draw. It was the second edition that was won through a penalty shootout, 21 years later.

== Qualification ==
Pos	Team	Pld	W	D	L	GF	GF	Pts	PS
1	Espanyol	24	20	0	4	80	25	60	▲2
2	Híspalis	24	19	3	2	78	37	60	▲3
3	Levante	24	17	4	3	65	15	55	▼1
4	Rayo Vallecano	24	15	3	6	58	36	48	▲3
5	Athletic Club	24	13	2	9	52	46	41	▼4
6	Puebla	24	11	1	12	37	53	34	Same position
7	Estudiantes	24	9	5	10	45	38	29	▲5
8	Barcelona	24	8	4	12	39	51	28	▲1
9	Lagunak	24	8	2	14	34	47	26	▲2

=== Teams by autonomous community ===
Community	Teams
(Catalonia) Catalunya	2: Barcelona, Espanyol
Andalusia	1: Híspalis
(Community of Madrid) Madrid	1: Rayo Vallecano
(Basque Country (autonomous community)) Euskadi	1: Athletic Club
Extremadura	1: Puebla
(Navarre) Navarra	1: Lagunak
(Valencian Community) Comunidad Valenciana	1: Levante

== Results ==
=== Quarter-finals ===
Team 1	Agg.	Team 2	1st leg	2nd leg
Levante	4–0	Barcelona	1–0	3–0
Espanyol	7–3	Híspalis	4–1	3–2
Lagunak	5–4	Puebla	3–1	2–3
Athletic Club	3–8	Rayo Vallecano	2–4	1–4

=== Semifinals ===
Team 1	Agg.	Team 2	1st leg	2nd leg
Levante	0–1	Espanyol	0–0	0–1
Lagunak	6–5	Rayo Vallecano	1–2	5–3

=== Final ===
June 11, 2006
12:00

Espanyol	2 – 2 (a.e.t.)	Lagunak
Miranda 54' (pen.); Serna 96'		Astiz 76'; Zufía 106'
Penalties
Miranda (penalty scored); Adriana (penalty scored); Rubio (penalty scored); Serna (penalty scored)	4 - 3	(penalty scored) Luna; (penalty scored) Azagra; (penalty scored) Oset; (penalty missed) Sandra; (penalty missed) Tiara

Nazaret, Valencia
Attendance: 500
Referee: Soriano
