= CD Sondika =

Spanish football club

Sondika
- Full name: Club Deportivo Sondika
- Founded: 1942; 84 years ago
- Ground: Basozabal, Sondika, Basque Country, Spain
- Capacity: 2,000
- President: Jose Luis Larrea
- Head coach: Miguel Llona
- League: Primera División – Group 1
- 2024–25: Preferente, 14th of 18 (relegated)
| Home colours | Away colours |

Club Deportivo Sondika is a football club from Sondika, Biscay, Basque Country, Spain, founded in 1942. It is most notable for its former women's section, which was founded in 1970 as Maiona de Sondika and later changed its name to Txorrieriko Neskak before becoming CD Sondika's women's team in the 1980s.

CD Sondika played in the top national category between 1994 and 2000. Its best results were a 4th position in the 1995 División de Honor and reaching the league's Final Four (established in 1996) in 1998. In 2000 the section was disbanded and most of its players founded Leioa EFT, a new club which two years later became the women's section of Athletic Bilbao.

CD Sondika still competes in the lower regional male categories, playing in Primera División – Group 1 at the Basozabal ground.

== Season to season ==
=== Men's ===
| Season | Tier | Division | Place | Copa del Rey |
|---|---|---|---|---|
| 1943–44 | 5 | 2ª Reg. | 2nd | |
| 1944–45 | 5 | 2ª Reg. | 4th | |
| 1945–46 | 5 | 2ª Reg. | 1st | |
| 1946–47 | 5 | 2ª Reg. | 2nd | |
| 1947–48 | 5 | 2ª Reg. | 1st | |
| 1948–49 | 5 | 2ª Reg. | 4th | |
| 1949–50 | 5 | 2ª Reg. | 11th | |
| 1950–51 | 5 | 2ª Reg. | 12th | |
| 1951–52 | 6 | 3ª Reg. | 4th | |
| 1952–53 | 6 | 3ª Reg. | 5th | |
| 1953–54 | 6 | 3ª Reg. | 1st | |
| 1954–55 | 5 | 2ª Reg. | 12th | |
| 1955–56 | 6 | 3ª Reg. | 1st | |
| 1956–57 | 5 | 2ª Reg. | 3rd | |
| 1957–58 | 5 | 2ª Reg. | 14th | |
| 1958–59 | 5 | 2ª Reg. | 10th | |
| 1959–60 | 5 | 2ª Reg. | 15th | |
| 1960–61 | 5 | 2ª Reg. | 7th | |
| 1961–62 | 5 | 2ª Reg. | 13th | |
| 1962–63 | 5 | 2ª Reg. | 14th | |

| Season | Tier | Division | Place | Copa del Rey |
|---|---|---|---|---|
| 1963–64 | 5 | 2ª Reg. | 14th | |
| 1964–65 | 5 | 2ª Reg. | 4th | |
| 1965–66 | 5 | 2ª Reg. | 3rd | |
| 1966–67 | 5 | 2ª Reg. | 7th | |
| 1967–68 | 5 | 2ª Reg. | 5th | |
| 1968–69 | 5 | 1ª Reg. | 16th | |
| 1969–70 | 6 | 2ª Reg. | 4th | |
| 1970–71 | 5 | 1ª Reg. | 12th | |
| 1971–72 | 5 | 1ª Reg. | 9th | |
| 1972–73 | 5 | 1ª Reg. | 12th | |
| 1973–74 | 5 | 1ª Reg. | 13th | |
| 1974–75 | 5 | 1ª Reg. | 20th | |
| 1975–76 | 6 | 2ª Reg. | 5th | |
| 1976–77 | 6 | 2ª Reg. | 3rd | |
| 1977–78 | 7 | 2ª Reg. | 5th | |
| 1978–79 | 7 | 2ª Reg. | 1st | |
| 1979–80 | 6 | 1ª Reg. | 18th | |
| 1980–81 | 7 | 2ª Reg. | 2nd | |
| 1981–82 | 7 | 2ª Reg. | 2nd | |
| 1982–83 | 6 | 1ª Reg. | 10th | |

| Season | Tier | Division | Place | Copa del Rey |
|---|---|---|---|---|
| 1983–84 | 6 | 1ª Reg. | 4th | |
| 1984–85 | 6 | 1ª Reg. | 1st | |
| 1985–86 | 5 | Reg. Pref. | 10th | |
| 1986–87 | 5 | Reg. Pref. | 20th | |
| 1987–88 | 6 | 1ª Reg. | 4th | |
| 1988–89 | 6 | 1ª Reg. | 6th | |
| 1989–90 | 6 | 1ª Reg. | 4th | |
| 1990–91 | 6 | 1ª Terr. | 2nd | |
| 1991–92 | 5 | Terr. Pref. | 15th | |
| 1992–93 | 5 | Terr. Pref. | 12th | |
| 1993–94 | 5 | Terr. Pref. | 10th | |
| 1994–95 | 5 | Terr. Pref. | 13th | |
| 1995–96 | 5 | Terr. Pref. | 18th | |
| 1996–97 | 5 | Terr. Pref. | 13th | |
| 1997–98 | 5 | Terr. Pref. | 9th | |
| 1998–99 | 5 | Terr. Pref. | 2nd | |
| 1999–2000 | 5 | Terr. Pref. | 3rd | |
| 2000–01 | 5 | Terr. Pref. | 2nd | |
| 2001–02 | 5 | Terr. Pref. | 4th | |
| 2002–03 | 5 | Div. Hon. | 12th | |

| Season | Tier | Division | Place | Copa del Rey |
|---|---|---|---|---|
| 2003–04 | 5 | Div. Hon. | 8th | |
| 2004–05 | 5 | Div. Hon. | 7th | |
| 2005–06 | 5 | Div. Hon. | 4th | |
| 2006–07 | 5 | Div. Hon. | 3rd | |
| 2007–08 | 5 | Div. Hon. | 9th | |
| 2008–09 | 5 | Div. Hon. | 14th | |
| 2009–10 | 5 | Div. Hon. | 8th | |
| 2010–11 | 5 | Div. Hon. | 3rd | |
| 2011–12 | 5 | Div. Hon. | 5th | |
| 2012–13 | 5 | Div. Hon. | 11th | |
| 2013–14 | 5 | Div. Hon. | 14th | |
| 2014–15 | 5 | Div. Hon. | 8th | |
| 2015–16 | 5 | Div. Hon. | 4th | |
| 2016–17 | 5 | Div. Hon. | 7th | |
| 2017–18 | 5 | Div. Hon. | 10th | |
| 2018–19 | 5 | Div. Hon. | 8th | |
| 2019–20 | 5 | Div. Hon. | 18th | |
| 2020–21 | 5 | Div. Hon. | 13th | |
| 2021–22 | 6 | Div. Hon. | 11th | |
| 2022–23 | 7 | Pref. | 15th | |

| Season | Tier | Division | Place | Copa del Rey |
|---|---|---|---|---|
| 2023–24 | 8 | 1ª Div. | 2nd | |
| 2024–25 | 7 | Pref. | 14th | |
| 2025–26 | 8 | 1ª Div. | | |

=== Women's ===
| Season | Division | Place | Copa de la Reina |
|---|---|---|---|
| 1992/93 | 2ª (G1) | 1st | Quarter-finals |
| 1993/94 | 1ª | 7th | Round of 16 |
| 1994/95 | 1ª | 4th | Quarter-finals |
| 1995/96 | 1ª | 5th | First round |
| 1996/97 | 1ª (G1) | 3rd | ? |
| 1997/98 | 1ª | 3rd | Quarter-finals |
| 1998/99 | 1ª (G1) | 3rd | Quarter-finals |
| 1999/00 | 1ª (G1) | 3rd | Quarter-finals |

== Former internationals ==
- (Spain) Tamara López
- (Spain) Maite Muguruza
