= CE Sabadell (women) =

Spanish football club

- Full name: Centre d'Esports Sabadell Futbol Club, S.A.D. (women)
- Nickname: Arlequinades
- Founded: 1982
- Ground: Ciutat Esportiva Sabadell-Olímpia, Sabadell; Catalonia, Spain
- Chairman: Pau Morilla-Giner
- Manager: Santi Fernández
- League: Preferent Catalana, Grup 1
- 2024-25: Primera Divisió Catalana, Grup 1, 1st (promoted)
Home colours	Away colours	Third colours

CE Sabadell (femení) is the women's football team of CE Sabadell. In the beginning of the 21st century, it was one of the most successful teams in Spanish women's football, winning the 2003 Copa de la Reina and finishing as runner-up in both the 2003-04 Superliga Femenina and the 2004 Copa de la Reina.

The team is playing now in Preferent Catalana, the fifth tier of Spanish football, after being promoted in the 2024-25 season.

== History ==
CE Sabadell was one of the founding members of the Spanish league in 1988.

Fifteen years later they won their first national title, the 2003 Copa de la Reina. The following season Sabadell were the runners-up in the league, and again reached the Copa's final, which this time they lost to Levante UD in the extra time.

However, this golden era was short-lived and the team withdrew from the competition in 2005 after collapsing financially.

3-time Ballon d'Or winner Alexia Putellas played in the youth teams of the club between 2001 and 2005.

== Stadium ==
CE Sabadell (women) plays home games at Ciutat Esportiva Sabadell-Olímpia, a few meters away from Nova Creu Alta stadium.

== Titles ==
- Primera División
  - Runners-up (1): 2003–04
- Copa de la Reina
  - Winners (1): 2002–03
  - Runners-up (2): 1991–92, 2003–04

=== Season to season ===
Season	Tier	Division	Place	Copa de la Reina
1988/89	1	1ª	7th	
1989/90	1	1ª	4th	
1990/91	1	1ª	PS, 6th	
1991/92	1	1ª	4th	Runner-up
1992/93	1	1ª	4th	Semifinals
1993/94	1	1ª	4th	Semifinals
1994/95	1	1ª	5th	Quarterfinals
1995/96	1	1ª	4th	Semifinals
1996/97	1	1ª (G3)	PS, 2nd	
1997/98	1	1ª (G3)	PS, 4th	
1998/99	1	1ª (G3)	PS, 6th	
1999/00	1	1ª (G3)	PS, 5th	
2000/01	1	1ª (G3)	PS, 5th	
2001/02	1	1ª	4th	Semifinals
2002/03	1	1ª	4th	Winner
2003/04	1	1ª	2nd	Runner-up
2004/05	1	1ª	8th	Quarterfinals
2005/06	1	1ª	(R)	
2006/07	3	1ª Catalana	15th	
2007/08	4	2ª Catalana	2nd	

Season	Tier	Division	Place	Copa del Rey
2008/09	3	1ª Catalana	15th	
2009/10	4	2ª Catalana	4th	
2010/11	4	1ª Catalana	8th	
2011/12	4	1ª Catalana	8th	
2012/13	4	1ª Catalana	1st	
2013/14	3	Preferent	11th	
2014/15	3	Preferent	5th	
2015/16	3	Preferent	1st	
2016/17	2	2ª	13th	
2017/18	3	Preferent	12th	

== Current squad ==
As of 1 January 2018. Note: Flags indicate national team as defined under FIFA eligibility rules; some limited exceptions apply. Players may hold more than one non-FIFA nationality.

No.	Pos.	Nation	Player
4		ESP	Desirée Moya
9		ESP	Melania Sierra
11		ESP	Ester Rodríguez
14		ESP	Ruth Méndez
16		ESP	Gisela Vidal
—		ESP	María Barrero
—		ESP	Sara García
—		ESP	María Mazuecos
—		ESP	Judith Muñoz

No.	Pos.	Nation	Player
—		ESP	Sara Palmiero
—		ESP	Carla Panisello
—		ESP	Silvia Piñol
—		ESP	Lidia Rodríguez
—		ESP	Sandra Sáez
—		ESP	Georgina Vila
—		ESP	María Bolívar
—		ESP	Paola Zambrano

=== Former internationals ===
- (Spain) Sonia Bermúdez
- (Spain) Priscila Borja
- (Spain) Marta Cubí
- (Spain) Susana Guerrero
- (Spain) Adriana Martín
- (Spain) Yolanda Mateos
- (Spain) Ángeles Parejo
- (Spain) Laura del Río
