= Extremadura Femenino CF =

Spanish football club

Extremadura Femenino
- Full name: Extremadura Femenino Club de Fútbol
- Founded: 2008; 18 years ago
- Stadium: Francisco de la Hera
- President: Pedro Hernández
- Head coach: Abel Domínguez
- League: 1ªN – Group 4
- 2018–19: 2ª – Group 4, 8th
| Home colours | Away colours |

Extremadura Unión Deportiva Femenino, formerly known as CF Puebla Extremadura and later as Extremadura Femenino CF, was a Spanish women football club from Almendralejo.

== History ==
Extremadura Femenino was founded in Puebla de la Calzada, Badajoz in 1995 as Club de Fútbol Femenino Puebla. It won the national championship in 2000, beating AD Torrejón in the final, and it was the runner-up in 1999 in 2002, second to CD Oroquieta and Levante UD. CFF Puebla also reached the national cup's final in 2001 and 2005, but lost both times to Levante.

Also known as Club Irex Puebla for sponsorship reasons from 2005, the team gradually declined through the 2000s, and suffering from financial strain in 2008 it merged with AD Las Mercedes to form Extremadura FCF, moving to Almendralejo. In the 2008–09 season the team collapsed, ending second to last in the table and being thus relegated. With the championship's expansion for the following season Extremadura applied for a place in 2009 and 2010, but it was denied it both times. Several of its former players played in the premier championship for SPC Llanos de Olivenza, which took its place as Extremadura's powerhouse.

On 15 July 2017, Extremadura Femenino would be integrated into the structure of Extremadura UD. In 2020, the partnership ended and the club returned to their previous name of Extremadura Femenino CF.

== Season by season ==
=== Puebla ===
| Season | Division | Place | Copa de la Reina |
|---|---|---|---|
| 1998–99 | 1ª (G. 4) | 2nd | |
| 1999–00 | 1ª | 1st | Semifinals |
| 2000–01 | 1ª (G. 4) | 1st | Runner-up |
| 2001–02 | 1ª | 2nd | First round |
| 2002–03 | 1ª | 3rd | Semifinals |
| 2003–04 | 1ª | 4th | Semifinals |
| 2004–05 | 1ª | 6th | Runner-up |
| 2005–06 | 1ª | 6th | Quarterfinals |
| 2006–07 | 1ª | 7th | Quarterfinals |
| 2007–08 | 1ª | 6th | Quarterfinals |

=== Extremadura Femenino ===
| Season | Division | Place | Copa de la Reina |
|---|---|---|---|
| 2008–09 | 1ª | 15th | |
| 2009–10 | 2ª | 1st | |
| 2010–11 | 2ª | 2nd | |
| 2011–12 | 2ª | 4th | |
| 2012–13 | 2ª | 8th | |
| 2013–14 | 2ª | 6th | |
| 2014–15 | 2ª | 6th | |
| 2015–16 | 2ª | 9th | |
| 2016–17 | 2ª | 5th | |

=== Extremadura ===
| Season | Division | Place | Copa de la Reina |
|---|---|---|---|
| 2017–18 | 2ª | 4th | |
| 2018–19 | 2ª | 8th (Note: Due to the creation of the new Primera División B, the team remained in the same league but it became the third level.) | |
| 2019–20 | 1ªN | | |

== Current squad ==
Note: Flags indicate national team as defined under FIFA eligibility rules; some limited exceptions apply. Players may hold more than one non-FIFA nationality.

| No. | Pos. | Nation | Player |
|---|---|---|---|
| 1 | GK | ESP | Aroa Barrero |
| 3 | DF | CMR | Eliane Bodolo |
| 4 | DF | ESP | Arancha Benítez |
| 5 | MF | CIV | Bernadette Kakounan |
| 6 | FW | ESP | Judith Gallardo |
| 7 | DF | ESP | Carmen Hermosel |
| 8 | MF | ESP | Lorena Romero |
| 9 | FW | ESP | Laura Carrasco |
| 10 | FW | ESP | Érika Martín |
| 12 | DF | ESP | Ana Rico |
| 13 | GK | ESP | Celia Gracia |

| No. | Pos. | Nation | Player |
|---|---|---|---|
| 15 | FW | CMR | Agnès Nkada |
| 17 | DF | ESP | Emma González |
| 18 | MF | ESP | Sara Murillo |
| 20 | MF | GHA | Lily Niber-Lawrence |
| 21 | FW | ESP | Sheyla Venegas |
| 23 | FW | ESP | María Aguza |
| — | GK | CMR | Carole Mimboe |
| — | FW | ESP | Loli Reyman |
| — | | ESP | María Becerra |
| — | | ESP | María Antonia García |
| — | | ESP | Lola Santiago |

== Honours ==
=== As Puebla ===
- División de Honor (1)
  - 2000
