= 2005–06 Superliga Femenina =

Superliga
- Season: 2005–06
- Champions: Espanyol
- Relegated: Estudiantes (dissolved); Gijón
- Women's Cup: Espanyol
- Matches: 156
- Goals: 626 (4.01 per match)

The 2005–06 Superliga season was the 18th since its establishment. Espanyol won its first title ever.

Before the start of the competition, Sabadell withdrew from the league.

== Teams and locations ==
Team	Location
Athletic Bilbao	Bilbao
Barcelona	Barcelona
Espanyol	Barcelona
Estudiantes	Huelva
Gijón	Gijón
Lagunak	Barañáin
Levante	Valencia
Oviedo Moderno	Oviedo
Puebla	Puebla de la Calzada
Rayo Vallecano	Madrid
Híspalis (Note: Híspalis signed a collaboration agreement with Sevilla FC and started to play with their name and their colors.)	Seville
Torrejón	Torrejón de Ardoz
Transportes Alcaine	Zaragoza

== League table ==
Pos	Team	Pld	W	D	L	GF	GA	GD	Pts	Relegation
1	Espanyol (C)	24	20	0	4	80	25	+55	60	Qualification to UEFA Women's Cup and Copa de la Reina
2	Híspalis	24	19	3	2	78	37	+41	60	Qualification to Copa de la Reina
3	Levante	24	17	4	3	65	15	+50	55	Qualification to Copa de la Reina
4	Rayo Vallecano	24	15	3	6	58	36	+22	48	Qualification to Copa de la Reina
5	Athletic Bilbao	24	13	2	9	52	46	+6	41	Qualification to Copa de la Reina
6	Irex Puebla	24	11	1	12	37	53	−16	34	Qualification to Copa de la Reina
7	Estudiantes	24	9	5	10	45	38	+7	32	Dissolved
8	Barcelona	24	8	4	12	39	51	−12	28	Qualification to Copa de la Reina
9	Lagunak	24	8	2	14	34	47	−13	26	Qualification to Copa de la Reina
10	Torrejón	24	7	4	13	47	55	−8	25	
11	Oviedo Moderno	24	6	4	14	41	60	−19	22	
12	Transportes Alcaine	24	5	3	16	31	67	−36	18	
13	Gijón (R)	24	0	1	23	19	96	−77	1	Relegation to Liga Nacional
14	Sabadell (Note: Sabadell retired from the competition after the round 8. All its matched were annulled.) (D)	0	0	0	0	0	0	0	0	Dissolved

Source: Soccerway
Rules for classification: 1) Points; 2) Head-to-head points; 3) Head-to-head goal difference; 4) Goal difference; 5) Goals scored.
(C) Champions; (D) Disqualified; (R) Relegated

== Results ==
Home \ Away	ATH	BAR	ESP	EST	GIJ	HIS	PUE	LAG	LEV	OVI	RAY	TOR	ALC
Athletic Bilbao	—	3–0	1–4	1–0	4–2	3–3	3–1	3–1	1–1	2–0	0–3	4–0	4–1
Barcelona	0–2	—	0–3	3–3	2–1	0–1	2–3	2–3	0–3	3–2	1–3	2–2	3–0
Espanyol	3–1	7–1	—	3–1	4–0	2–0	5–1	5–1	1–2	7–1	4–0	3–1	4–0
Estudiantes	3–1	0–3	0–4	—	7–0	0–2	6–1	1–1	0–2	4–4	1–3	3–2	1–1
Gijón	1–2	1–5	0–3	0–5	—	3–5	1–4	2–2	0–7	1–5	1–3	0–2	1–4
Híspalis	4–2	3–3	4–3	2–0	7–1	—	2–1	3–1	2–0	3–1	5–3	3–1	5–0
Irex Puebla	2–0	2–0	0–2	1–0	3–0	1–5	—	2–0	1–0	3–1	1–4	0–4	2–0
Lagunak	2–3	3–1	0–2	0–1	4–0	1–4	1–2	—	2–0	2–0	0–3	2–1	3–1
Levante	4–1	1–0	5–1	2–1	2–0	2–0	5–0	3–1	—	4–0	0–2	6–0	5–0
Oviedo Moderno	2–3	2–3	2–0	1–3	3–0	4–4	2–1	2–1	0–4	—	1–1	1–2	0–1
Rayo Vallecano	3–2	1–1	1–2	0–3	6–1	1–2	5–1	1–0	1–1	4–1	—	3–1	3–1
Torrejón	3–1	2–3	1–4	0–1	4–2	2–3	2–2	4–0	2–2	3–3	2–3	—	5–2
Transportes Alcaine	3–5	0–1	2–4	1–1	3–1	2–6	3–2	1–3	1–1	1–3	1–3	2–1	—

Legend: Blue = home team win; Yellow = draw; Red = away team win.

== See also ==
- 2006 Copa de la Reina de Fútbol
