= 1990–91 Liga Nacional de Fútbol Femenino =

Liga Nacional
- Season: 1990–91
- Dates: 13 January 1991 – 5 May 1991
- Champions: Oiartzun (1st title)
- Relegated: Puente Castro; Tradehi Oviedo
- Matches: 56
- Goals: 266 (4.75 per match)

The 1990–91 Liga Nacional de Fútbol Femenino was the third season of the Spanish women's football top tier. Oiartzun achieved their first title ever.

== Teams and locations ==
Team	Location
Añorga	San Sebastián
Atlético Villa de Madrid	Madrid
CF Barcelona	Barcelona
Oiartzun	Oiartzun
Oroquieta Villaverde	Madrid
Peña Barcilona	Barcelona
Puente Castro	León
Tradehi Oviedo	Oviedo

== League table ==
Pos	Team	Pld	W	D	L	GF	GA	GD	Pts	Relegation	OIA	ATM	AÑO	ORO	PBA	BAR	PCA	TRA
1	Oiartzun (C)	14	9	2	3	45	22	+23	20		—	3–0	3–1	1–1	1–1	6–1	10–2	4–2
2	Atlético Villa de Madrid	14	9	2	3	32	22	+10	20		4–1	—	2–0	1–2	2–1	3–1	4–3	3–2
3	Añorga	14	10	0	4	67	21	+46	20		2–1	3–2	—	6–0	2–1	8–0	8–1	8–1
4	Oroquieta Villaverde	14	8	1	5	39	34	+5	17		1–4	1–4	4–7	—	3–2	2–0	7–1	3–1
5	Peña Barcilona	14	6	4	4	22	15	+7	16		0–1	1–1	3–2	1–0	—	0–0	3–0	4–1
6	CF Barcelona	14	5	1	8	23	39	−16	11		3–2	1–2	1–0	2–6	1–2	—	4–2	3–1
7	Puente Castro (R)	14	1	2	11	21	68	−47	4	Relegation to second tier	2–5	2–2	2–13	1–6	0–2	2–4	—	3–0
8	Tradehi Oviedo (R)	14	1	2	11	17	45	−28	4	Relegation to second tier	2–3	1–2	0–7	2–3	1–1	3–1	0–0	—

Source: Arquero Arba
Rules for classification: 1) Points; 2) Head-to-head points; 3) Head-to-head goal difference; 4) Goal difference; 5) Goals scored.
(C) Champions; (R) Relegated
