= Yolanda Mateos =

Spanish footballer (born 1972)

Personal information
- Full name: Yolanda Mateos Franco
- Date of birth: 26 February 1972 (age 54)
- Place of birth: Elgoibar, Basque Country
- Position: Forward

Senior career*
Years	Team	Apps	(Gls)
1988–1991	CD Urki		
1992–2003	Eibartarrak FK		
2003	Levante UD		
2003–2004	CE Sabadell		

International career^{‡}
1996–2001	Spain	26	(8)
- * Club domestic league appearances and goals as of 12:00, 15 September 2011 (UTC) ‡ National team caps and goals as of 12:00, 15 September 2011 (UTC)

Yolanda Mateos Franco (born 1972) is a Spanish former footballer who played as a winger for Eibartarrak FT, Levante UD and CE Sabadell in the Superliga. She was a member of the Spain women's national football team, and she took part in the 1997 European Championship. She scored the goal in the qualifying play-offs against England that qualified Spain for the tournament for the first time.

International goals

Yolanda Mateos – goals for Spain
#	Date	Venue	Opponent	Score	Result	Competition
1.	28 June 1996	ŠK Slávia Zeleneč -štadión, Zeleneč	Slovakia		1–1	Women's Tournament Slovakia 1996
2.	29 September 1996	Falmer Stadium, Brighton and Hove	England	0–1	1–1	1997 UEFA Women's Championship Qualification – Play-off
3.	1 November 1997	Estadi La Bòbila, Gavà	Ukraine	1–2	1–2	1999 FIFA Women's World Cup Qualification
4.	24 May 1998	Söderstadion, Stockholm	Sweden	2–1	3–1	1999 FIFA Women's World Cup Qualification
5.	13 September 1998	Forthbank Stadium, Stirling	Scotland	0–2	0–3	1999 FIFA Women's World Cup Qualification – Play-off
6.	7 November 1999	Ciudad Deportiva, Plasencia	Sweden		1–1	2001 UEFA Women's Championship Qualification
7.	21 May 2000	A Lomba, Vilagarcía de Arousa	England	1–2	1–2	2001 UEFA Women's Championship Qualification
8.	21 November 2000	Odense Stadion, Odense	Denmark	4–2	4–2	2001 UEFA Women's Championship Qualification – Play-off
