= Auxiliadora Jiménez =

Spanish footballer (born 1975)

Personal information
- Full name: María Auxiliadora Jiménez González
- Date of birth: January 11, 1975 (age 51)
- Place of birth: Ronda, Spain
- Height: 1.63 m (5 ft 4 in)
- Position: Forward

Senior career*
Years	Team	Apps	(Gls)
- Atlético Málaga
1999–2003	Levante		
2003–2004	Estudiantes Huelva		
2004–2007	Híspalis		
2007–2009	Atlético Málaga		

International career
1996–2002	Spain	19	(6)
- * Club domestic league appearances and goals

María Auxiliadora Jiménez González, more commonly known as Auxi, is a former Spanish football player. Throughout her career she played in Spain's Superliga Femenina for Atlético Málaga, Levante UD, Estudiantes Huelva and CD Híspalis. She won three leagues with Málaga and Levante, and was the league's top scorer in 2000 and 2006.

Auxi was a member of the Spain women's national football team, and played the 1997 European Championship.

== International goals ==
- Women's Tournament Slovakia
  - 1 in FR Yugoslavia 1–1 Spain (1996)
- 1999 FIFA Women's World Cup play-off
  - 1 in Scotland 0–3 Spain (1998)
- 2003 FIFA Women's World Cup qualification
  - 2 in Spain 6–1 Iceland (2001)
  - 1 in Spain 2–1 Russia (2002)
- 2009 Euro qualification
  - 1 in Belarus 0–3 Spain (2007)
