= 2004–05 Superliga Femenina =

Superliga
- Season: 2004–05
- Champions: Athletic Bilbao (3rd title)
- Relegated: Pozuelo de Alarcón; Nuestra Señora de Belén
- UEFA Cup: Athletic Bilbao
- Matches: 182
- Goals: 709 (3.9 per match)
- Top goalscorer: Marta Cubí (32 goals)

The 2004–05 Superliga season was the 17th since its establishment.

Athletic Bilbao conquered their third consecutive title.

== Teams and locations ==
Team	Location
Athletic Bilbao	Bilbao
Barcelona	Barcelona
Espanyol	Barcelona
Estudiantes	Huelva
Híspalis	Seville
Lagunak	Barañáin
Levante	Valencia
Nuestra Señora de Belén	Burgos
Oviedo Moderno	Oviedo
Pozuelo de Alarcón	Pozuelo de Alarcón
Puebla	Puebla de la Calzada
Rayo Vallecano	Madrid
Sabadell	Sabadell
Torrejón	Torrejón de Ardoz

== League table ==
Pos	Team	Pld	W	D	L	GF	GA	GD	Pts	Qualification or relegation
1	Athletic Bilbao (C)	26	20	6	0	77	15	+62	66	Qualification for UEFA Women's Cup and Copa de la Reina
2	Levante	26	20	3	3	74	18	+56	63	Qualification for Copa de la Reina
3	Espanyol	26	18	3	5	92	46	+46	57	Qualification for Copa de la Reina
4	Torrejón	26	17	4	5	52	28	+24	55	Qualification for Copa de la Reina
5	Híspalis	26	15	4	7	67	32	+35	49	Qualification for Copa de la Reina
6	Puebla	26	13	4	9	55	37	+18	43	Qualification for Copa de la Reina
7	Rayo Vallecano	26	11	1	14	53	54	−1	34	Qualification for Copa de la Reina
8	Sabadell	26	8	5	13	59	63	−4	29	Qualification for Copa de la Reina
9	Barcelona	26	8	5	13	42	59	−17	29	
10	Oviedo Moderno	26	6	5	15	27	57	−30	23	
11	Lagunak	26	5	7	14	23	50	−27	22	
12	Estudiantes	26	5	5	16	42	64	−22	20	
13	Pozuelo de Alarcón (R)	26	4	4	18	24	75	−51	16	Relegation to Primera Nacional
14	Nuestra Señora de Belén (R)	26	3	2	21	22	111	−89	11	Relegation to Primera Nacional

Source: Arquero Arba
(C) Champions; (R) Relegated

== Results ==
Home \ Away	ATH	BAR	ESP	EST	HIS	LAG	LEV	NSB	OVI	POZ	PUE	RAY	SAB	TOR
Athletic Bilbao	—	5–1	5–3	4–0	1–1	7–0	1–1	5–0	1–0	4–0	4–1	4–1	6–1	4–1
Barcelona	0–2	—	4–4	2–2	2–2	2–1	1–2	3–0	0–3	1–1	1–2	3–0	1–0	5–0
Espanyol	2–2	7–1	—	3–1	2–1	1–1	2–0	9–0	3–0	7–0	4–0	2–1	4–1	2–3
Estudiantes	0–1	3–4	1–2	—	2–4	1–1	0–5	3–1	5–0	0–3	3–3	1–5	4–1	1–1
Híspalis	1–2	8–0	5–3	1–0	—	5–0	2–4	4–2	1–0	4–2	2–1	5–0	4–1	3–0
Lagunak	0–1	3–1	2–3	0–1	1–0	—	0–6	4–0	1–1	1–0	0–4	0–1	1–1	0–0
Levante	0–0	4–0	4–0	5–1	3–2	3–0	—	10–1	3–0	7–0	3–2	4–2	2–1	0–1
Nuestra Señora de Belén	0–6	0–4	2–4	0–4	1–8	2–1	0–1	—	1–1	0–2	1–2	2–6	2–6	1–9
Oviedo Moderno	0–1	2–1	0–4	2–2	1–5	1–1	0–2	0–3	—	3–2	0–2	1–3	1–4	0–3
Pozuelo de Alarcón	0–5	0–4	1–7	1–0	2–1	1–1	0–0	2–3	0–1	—	1–5	0–4	1–3	0–3
Puebla	0–2	0–0	2–3	5–1	0–0	2–0	2–1	6–0	1–4	3–1	—	4–0	2–1	0–1
Rayo Vallecano	1–3	1–0	2–3	4–2	0–2	2–1	0–1	7–0	0–3	4–1	1–4	—	3–4	1–1
Sabadell	1–1	4–0	4–7	3–2	1–3	1–2	0–1	9–0	3–3	3–3	2–2	2–4	—	2–1
Torrejón	0–0	3–1	3–1	3–2	2–1	3–1	0–2	3–1	5–0	1–0	1–0	1–0	3–0	—

Source: Arquero Arba
Legend: Blue = home team win; Yellow = draw; Red = away team win.

== See also ==
- 2005 Copa de la Reina de Fútbol
