= 2002 Copa de la Reina de Fútbol =

Tournament details
- Country: Spain

The 2002 Copa de la Reina de Fútbol was the 20th edition of the main Spanish women's football cup. Levante won its third title.

== Bracket ==
Round of 16
Oviedo Moderno	0	1	1
Estudiantes	0	3	3
Espanyol	3	2	5
Puebla	1	3	4
Nuestra Señora de Belén	2	2	4
Sabadell	3	5	8

Quarter-finals
Pozuelo de Alarcón	3	2	5
Estudiantes	0	4	4
Torrejón	0	3	3
Espanyol	2	2	4
Levante	5	8	13
Nuestra Señora de la Antigua	0	0	0

Semi-finals
Pozuelo de Alarcón	0	w/o	—
Espanyol	6	w/o	—
Sabadell	0	0	0
Levante	6	8	14

Final
Espanyol	0
Levante	1
