= CFF Estudiantes de Huelva =

Spanish football club

Estudiantes de Huelva
- Full name: Club de Fútbol Femenino Estudiantes de Huelva
- Founded: 1998
- Dissolved: 2006
- 2005–06: Primera División, 7th
Home colours

Club de Fútbol Femenino Estudiantes de Huelva was a Spanish women's football team from Huelva created in 1998 and disbanded in 2006. A founding member of the new Superliga Femenina in 2001, it was the city's leading women's club until its folding. Its major success was reaching the 2003 Copa de la Reina final, which they lost to CE Sabadell.

Estudiantes folded three years later after collapsing financially. Real Sociedad took up their place in the Superliga while Sporting Huelva became Huelva's first team.

== Season to season ==
Season	Division	Place	Copa de la Reina
1998–99	1ª	3rd	
1999–00	1ª	3rd	
2000–01	1ª	4th	First round
2001–02	1ª	5th	Quarterfinals
2002–03	1ª	5th	Runner-up
2003–04	1ª	6th	
2004–05	1ª	12th	
2005–06	1ª	7th	

== Former internationals ==
- Brazil: Andréia Suntaque, Kátia Teixeira.
- Portugal: Edite Fernandes.
- Spain: Sonia Bermúdez, Priscila Borja, Vanesa Gimbert, Auxiliadora Jiménez, Keka Vega.
