= Levante UD Femenino =

Spanish football team

Levante Femenino
- Full name: Levante Unión Deportiva, S.A.D.
- Nickname: Granotes
- Founded: 1993 (as San Vicente CFF); 1998; 28 years ago
- Stadium: Ciudad Deportiva
- Capacity: 600
- Honorary president: Paco Fenollosa
- Head coach: Ángel Saiz
- League: Liga F
- 2024–25: 12th
- Website: levanteud.com/women
Home colours	Away colours	Third colours

Levante Unión Deportiva Femenino is the women's football team of Valencian football club Levante UD, based at Ciudad Deportiva in Buñol and playing in Primera Federación, after being relgated from the Liga F after the 2025-26 season.

== History ==
Founded in 1993 as San Vicente CFF, the team was absorbed by Levante in 1998 after it won the national championship in its debut season in the top category. It subsequently attained three more league titles and six Cups between 1997 and 2008 including two doubles (2001, 2002) making it the most successful Spanish team, tied with Athletic Bilbao in leagues and RCD Espanyol in cups as of 2012. It was eliminated in its three appearances at the UEFA Women's Cup at the group stage, one round short of the quarter-finals.

Levante always ranked among the championship's top three between 2000 and 2009, but it subsequently experienced a slump ending the 2010 and 2011 seasons in mid-table. The team improved in 2012 with a 5th position, but this result marked its first absence since 1999 in the shortened Copa de la Reina. The club remained consistent for the next decade, only finishing lower than 5th once and securing 3rd place in three consecutive seasons (without challenging for the title itself) between 2018–19 and 2020–21, though there was no great impact in the cup in this period. Real Madrid officially joined the league in 2020, immediately 'raiding' Levante for Marta Corredera and Ivana Andrés and enticing away Rocío Gálvez, Esther González and Claudia Zornoza a year later.

== Players ==
=== Current squad ===
As of 12 August 2026

Note: Flags indicate national team as defined under FIFA eligibility rules; some limited exceptions apply. Players may hold more than one non-FIFA nationality.

No.	Pos.	Nation	Player
3	MG	ARG	Alma Velasco
6	MF	ESP	Gema Soliveres
8	MF	ESP	Bascu
9	FW	ESP	Ariana Arias
13	GK	ESP	Laura Coronado
14	MF	POR	Dolores Silva
15	DF	ESP	María Gabaldón
17	DF	ESP	María Alharilla
18	FW	NGA	Zipporah Agama

No.	Pos.	Nation	Player
20	DF	NGA	Paulina Ali
23	MF	ESP	Núria Escoms
29	MF	ESP	Lucía González Benito
31	FW	ESP	Inés Rizo
32	GK	ESP	Erika Rubio
35	MF	ESP	Daniela Luque Fernández
36	GK	ESP	Anna Álvarez

=== Former internationals ===
National team	Players
(Spain) Spain	Alba Redondo, Ivana Andrés, Ona Batlle, Sonia Bermúdez, Alharilla Casado, Maider Castillo, Rosa Castillo, Marta Corredera, Gurutze Fernández, María Fernández, Alicia Fuentes, Ruth García, Gemma Gili, Vanesa Gimbert, Susana Guerrero, Auxiliadora Jiménez, Yolanda Mateos, Sara Monforte, Marina Nohalez, María José Pons, María Méndez, Mar Prieto, Montserrat Tomé, Sandra Vilanova, Nagore Calderón, Cristina Estévez, Olga Moreno, Marta Mateos, Adriana Martín, Esther González, María José Pérez, Alexia Putellas, Laura del Río, Olga García, Mari Paz Vilas, Silvia Zarza, Rocío Gálvez, Claudia Zornoza
Argentina	Romina Ferro, Estefanía Banini
Australia	Aivi Luik
Brazil	Grazielle Pinheiro, Kátia Cilene, Thaís Ribeiro, Giovana Queiroz, Vânia Martins (Note: She also played for Equatorial Guinea, but FIFA declared her ineligible to play for that national team.)
Colombia	Daniela Montoya
Costa Rica	Noelia Bermúdez
Denmark	Sofie Junge Pedersen
(Republic of Ireland) Ireland	Tyler Toland
Italy	Pamela Conti, Katia Serra
Ivory Coast	Ida Guehai
Mexico	Charlyn Corral, Greta Espinoza
Portugal	Jéssica Silva
Romania	Olivia Oprea
Switzerland	Vanessa Bernauer, Marina Keller

== Season to season ==
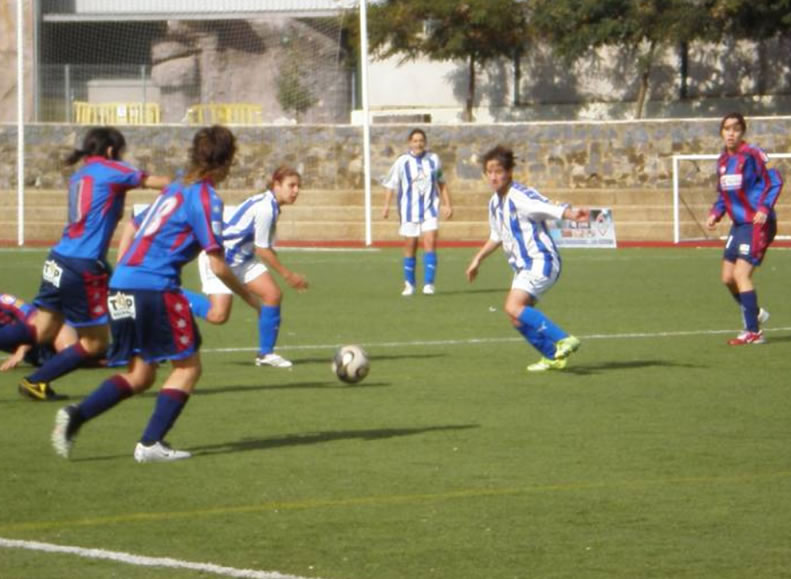
2006–07 Superliga match against Sporting Huelva

- As San Vicente CFF

Season	Div.	Pos.	Copa de la Reina	Champions League	Top scorer(s)	Goal
1994–95	2ª	5th				
1995–96	2ª	3rd				
1996–97	1ª	1st				
1997–98	1ª	2nd	Quarterfinals			

- As Levante UD

Season	Div.	Pos.	Copa de la Reina	Champions League	Top scorer(s)	Goal
1998–99	1ª	GS				
1999–00	1ª	3rd	Champion			
2000–01	1ª	1st	Champion			
2001–02	1ª	1st	Champion	Round of 32		
2002–03	1ª	2nd	Semifinals	Round of 32		
2003–04	1ª	3rd	Champion			
2004–05	1ª	2nd	Champion			
2005–06	1ª	3rd	Semifinals			
2006–07	1ª	3rd	Champion			
2007–08	1ª	1st	Runner-up		Del Río	16
2008–09	1ª	2nd	Quarterfinals	Round of 16	Conti, Del Río	16
2009–10	1ª	8th	Quarterfinals		Motoso	7
2010–11	1ª	9th	Round of 16		Conti	10
2011–12	1ª	5th			Putellas	15
2012–13	1ª	4th	Semifinals		Buceta	10
2013–14	1ª	5th	Semifinals		Casado, O. García	6
2014–15	1ª	5th	Quarterfinals		Adriana	21
2015–16	1ª	4th	Semifinals		Corral	22
2016–17	1ª	4th	Quarterfinals		Corral	20
2017–18	1ª	8th	Quarterfinals		Corral	24
2018–19	1ª	3rd	Quarterfinals		Corral	20
2019–20	1ª	3rd	Round of 16		Navarro, Redondo	8
2020–21	1ª	3rd	Semifinals		González	29
2021–22	1ª	6th	Quarterfinals	Round 2	Redondo	12
2022–23	1ª	3rd	Round of 16		Redondo	27
2023–24	1ª	4th	Quarterfinals	Round 1	Redondo	16
2024–25	1ª	12th	Quarterfinals		Chacón	11

== UEFA competition record ==
Competition	Season	Round	Opponent	Result	Scorers
UEFA Women's Cup	2001–02	Group Stage	(Germany) Frankfurt	0–1	
UEFA Women's Cup	2001–02	Group Stage	(Armenia) College SC	17–0	Jiménez 4, Prieto 4, R. Castillo 2, Gimbert 2, Monje 2, Fuentes, Del Río, Soler
UEFA Women's Cup	2001–02	Group Stage	(Moldova) Codru Chişinău	3–1	Gimbert, Jiménez, Soler
UEFA Women's Cup	2002–03	Group Stage	(Belgium) Eendracht Aalst	8–0	Fuentes 3, Jiménez 2, Prieto 2, Gimbert
UEFA Women's Cup	2002–03	Group Stage	(England) Arsenal	1–2	Prieto
UEFA Women's Cup	2002–03	Group Stage	(Azerbaijan) Gömrükçü Baku	2–1	Fuentes, Moreno
UEFA Women's Cup	2008–09	Preliminary Stage	(North Macedonia) Skopje	8–0	Conti 3, Pérez 3, Donaire, González
UEFA Women's Cup	2008–09	Preliminary Stage	(Belgium) Tienen	9–2	Conti 3, Donaire 3, Del Río, Vilanova
UEFA Women's Cup	2008–09	Preliminary Stage	(Czech Republic) Sparta Prague	0–0	
UEFA Women's Cup	2008–09	Group Stage	(Denmark) Brøndby	0–1	
UEFA Women's Cup	2008–09	Group Stage	(Germany) Duisburg	0–5	
UEFA Women's Cup	2008–09	Group Stage	(Ukraine) Naftokhimik Kalush	4–1	R. Castillo, Pérez, Prim, Ves
UEFA Women's Champions League	2021–22	First round Semi-final	(Scotland) Celtic	2–1	Redondo, Toletti
UEFA Women's Champions League	2021–22	First round Final	(Norway) Rosenborg	4–3	Queiroz 2, Baños, Toletti
UEFA Women's Champions League	2021–22	Second round	(France) Olympique Lyonnais	1–2 (H)	Cometti
UEFA Women's Champions League	2021–22	Second round	(France) Olympique Lyonnais	1–2 (A)	Crivelari
UEFA Women's Champions League	2023–24	First round Semi-final	(Iceland) Stjarnan	4–0	Gabi 3, Redondo
UEFA Women's Champions League	2023–24	First round Final	(Netherlands) Twente	2–3	Tomás, Redondo

== Titles ==
- Spanish League (4)
  - 1997, (Note: As San Vicente CFF.) 2001, 2002, 2008
- Spanish Cup (6)
  - 2000, 2001, 2002, 2004, 2005, 2007
- Spanish Supercup (2)
  - 1997, 2000

=== Invitational trophies ===
- COTIF (3)
  - 2011, 2012, 2013
- Pyrénées Cup (1)
  - 2012
- Sport Mundi Tournament (2)
  - 2009, 2010
