= Puebla de la Calzada =

Coordinates: 38°54′N 6°37′W

- Flag Coat of arms
- Interactive map of Puebla de la Calzada
- Country: Spain
- Autonomous community: Extremadura
- Province: Badajoz
- Comarca: Tierra de Mérida - Vegas Bajas

Government
  - Alcalde: Juan Antonio González Gracia

Area
  - Total: 14.2 km^{2} (5.5 sq mi)
- Elevation: 191 m (627 ft)

Population (2025-01-01)
  - Total: 5,815
- Time zone: UTC+1 (CET)
  - Summer (DST): UTC+2 (CEST)
- Website: Ayuntamiento de Puebla de la Calzada

Puebla de la Calzada is a Spanish municipality in the province of Badajoz, Extremadura. It has a population of 5,685 (2007) and an area of 14.2 km^{2} (5.5 sq mi).

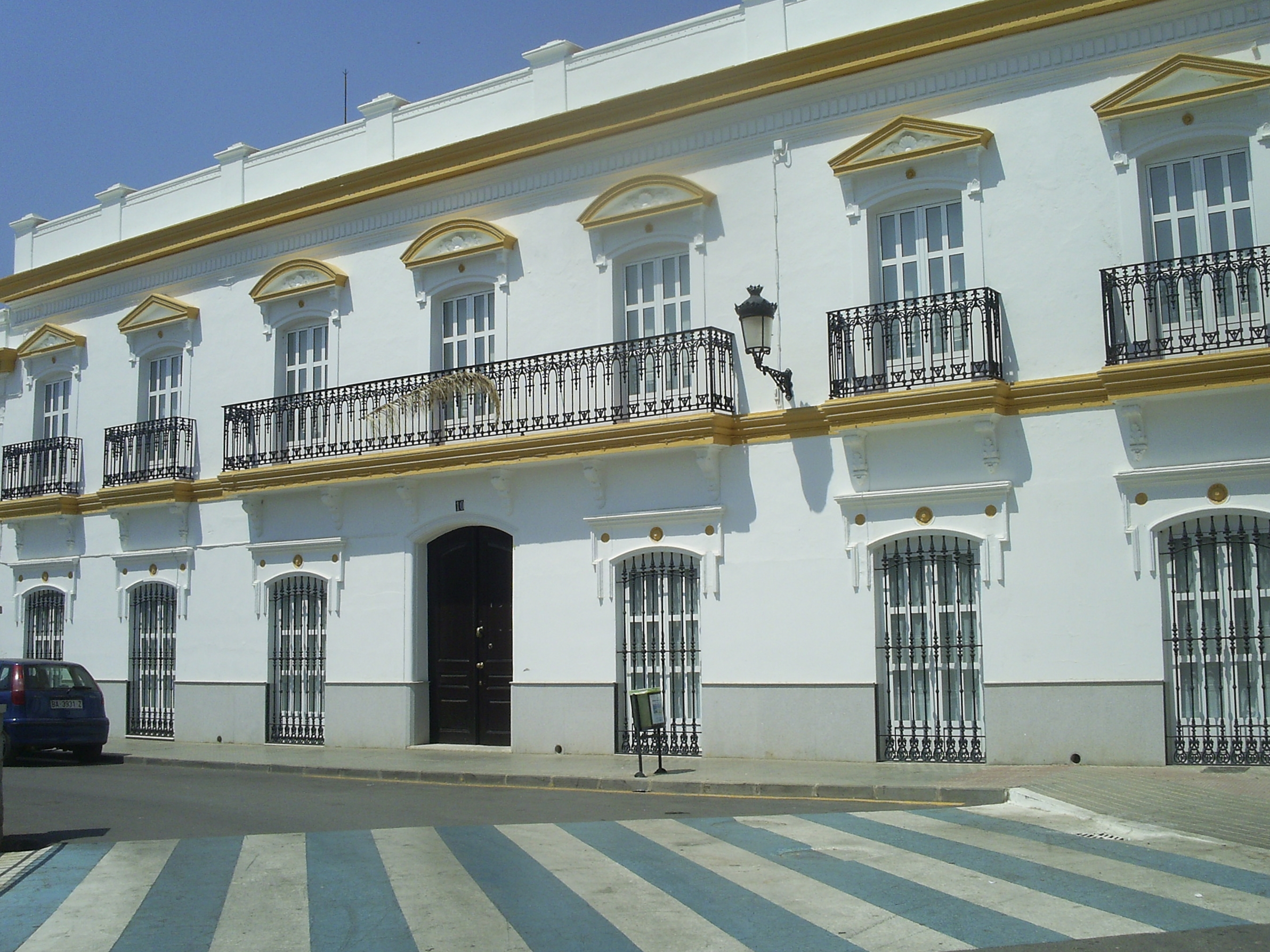
College of Our Lady of Carmen in Puebla de la Calzada, Spain

== See also ==
- List of municipalities in Badajoz
