= AD Torrejón CF (women) =

Spanish women's football team

Torrejón
- Full name: Agrupación Deportiva Torrejón Club de Fútbol
- Founded: 1996
- Ground: Las Veredillas; Torrejón de Ardoz (Madrid, Spain)
- Capacity: 1,300
- Chairman: (Spain) Ismael Monforte García
- Manager: (Spain) José Luis Crisenti
- League: Primera Autonómica
- Website: http://www.adtorrejoncf.com
Home colours	Away colours

AD Torrejón CF Femenino is a Spanish women's football team from Torrejón de Ardoz and the women's section of AD Torrejón CF. It was one of the leading teams in the Community of Madrid, playing in the Spanish premier league between 2002 and 2011. In 2016 the club was re-activated.

== Competition record ==
Season	Division	Position	W	D	L	GF	GA	Pts	Promotion / Playoffs	Copa de la Reina
1999–00	1 (Gr. 2)	1st	24	2	0	123	20	74	1–0 Levante, 0–0 Puebla^{1}	Quarterfinals
2000–01	1 (Gr. 2)	2nd	24	1	1	178	14	73		Quarterfinals
2001–02	1	7th	9	0	11	44	45	27		Quarterfinals
2002–03	1	6th	11	5	6	53	42	38	Quarterfinals	
2003–04	1	5th	16	5	5	68	48	53		
2004–05	1	4th	17	4	5	52	28	55		Semifinals
2005–06	1	10th	7	4	13	47	55	25		
2006–07	1	6th	11	4	11	42	39	37		Quarterfinals
2007–08	1	5th	11	4	11	44	42	37		Quarterfinals
2008–09	1	8th	12	2	16	52	68	38		Quarterfinals
2009–10	1	10th	14	4	6	67	34	46		Semifinals
2010–11	1	17th	12	7	7	37	29	43		
2011–12	2 (Gr. 5)	1st	21	3	2	94	28	66	1–2 Tacuense	
2012–13	2 (Gr. 5)	1st	21	2	3	111	15	65	2–0 7–1 Añorga, 3–1 1–2 Girona	
2013–14	3	8th	14	4	14	59	76	46		
2014–16	Did not register in any competition									
2016–17	4 (Gr. 2)	8th	14	4	10	91	62	46		
2017–18	4 (Gr. 2)	2nd	20	2	2	102	28	62		
2018–19	5 (Gr. 1)	2nd	21	1	4	152	33	64		
2019–20	4									

^{1} Puebla won the final on penalties.
