= Copa de la Reina de Fútbol =

Spain's women's football cup

Copa de la Reina
- Organiser(s): Royal Spanish Football Federation
- Founded: 1983
- Region: Spain
- Teams: 52
- Current champions: Barcelona (12th title)
- Most championships: Barcelona (12 titles)
- Website: rfef.es
- 2026–27 Copa de la Reina

The Copa de la Reina ('Queen's Cup') is an annual cup competition for Spanish women's association football teams organized by the Royal Spanish Football Federation. Its full name is Campeonato de España – Copa de Su Majestad la Reina (Championship of Spain – Her Majesty the Queen's Cup).

== History ==
The tournament's first edition took place in 1983, five years before the Spanish women's league was created. Up to the creation of the women's league the winners of this cup were considered Spanish football champions. The name plays on the men's cup, Copa del Rey ('King's Cup', named for the King of Spain.)

From 2004 to 2017, it was played as a knockout tournament taking place once the season was over as the top eight clubs at the end of the league season qualified for it. Since 2018, all the 16 teams of the first division joined the competition, that started to be played during the league season.

The 2021–22 season featured 52 clubs; all 16 teams in Primera División, all 32 teams from Segunda División Pro, and the four promoted teams from Primera Nacional de Fútbol. Reserve teams are excluded from participating in the tournament.

== Finals ==
In 1981 and 1982 two editions were held under the name Copa Reina Sofía ('Queen Sofía Cup') and won by Karbo. The first official recognized version of the tournament was the 1983 edition.

Until 1988, just before the creation of the national league, the winners were claimed as Spanish champions. Teams in bold won the double with the league title.

Year	Final host	Winner	Runner-up	Score
1983	Las Margaritas, Getafe	Karbo	Porvenir	4–1
1984	Riazor, A Coruña; Atotxa, San Sebastián	Karbo	Añorga	4–2, 1–2
1985	Riazor, A Coruña	Karbo	Peña Barcilona	2–2 (3–1 p)
1986	Jesús María Pereda, Medina de Pomar	Porvenir	Oiartzun	3–1
1987	Zumárraga	Oiartzun	Añorga	3–2
1988	Tomelloso	Oiartzun	Porvenir	8–0
1989	Las Gaunas, Logroño	Parque Alcobendas	Añorga	4–2
1990	Carlos Belmonte, Albacete	Añorga	Espanyol	2–0
1991	La Romareda, Zaragoza	Añorga	Barcelona	3–0
1992	Jesús María Pereda, Medina de Pomar	Oroquieta Villaverde	Sabadell	3–0
1993	Las Margaritas, Getafe	Añorga	Oroquieta Villaverde	2–1
1994	Navalcarbón, Las Rozas	Barcelona	Oroquieta Villaverde	2–1
1995	Coslada	Oroquieta Villaverde	Añorga	4–2
1996	Olímpic, Terrassa	Espanyol	Oroquieta Villaverde	3–0
1997	Estadio Municipal, Arganda del Rey	Espanyol	Atlético Málaga	4–2
1998	Camp d'Esports, Lleida	Atlético Málaga	Lagunak	4–0
1999	Tomelloso	Oroquieta Villaverde	Eibartarrak	4–2
2000	Ciutat de València, Valencia	Levante	Lagunak	3–0
2001	Antonio Amilivia, León	**Levante**	Puebla	5–1
2002	Ciutat de València, Valencia	**Levante**	Espanyol	1–0
2003	Nova Creu Alta, Sabadell	Sabadell	Estudiantes Huelva	3–1
2004	Anduva, Miranda de Ebro	Levante	Sabadell	3–1 (a.e.t.)
2005	Breña Alta, La Palma	Levante	Puebla	2–1
2006	Nazaret, Valencia	**Espanyol**	Lagunak	2–2 (4–3 p)
2007	García de la Mata, Madrid	Levante	Espanyol	3–1
2008	Julián Ariza, Torrelodones	Rayo Vallecano	Levante	3–2
2009	La Romareda, Zaragoza	Espanyol	Transportes Alcaine	5–1
2010	Artunduaga, Basauri	Espanyol	Rayo Vallecano	3–1
2011	La Ciudad del Fútbol, Las Rozas	Barcelona	Espanyol	1–0 (a.e.t.)
2012	La Ciudad del Fútbol, Las Rozas	Espanyol	Athletic Club	2–1 (a.e.t.)
2013	La Ciudad del Fútbol, Las Rozas	**Barcelona**	Transportes Alcaine	4–0
2014	Alfonso Murube, Ceuta	**Barcelona**	Athletic Club	1–1 (5–4 p)
2015	Álvarez Claro, Melilla	Sporting de Huelva	Valencia	2–1
2016	La Ciudad del Fútbol, Las Rozas	Atlético de Madrid	Barcelona	3–2
2017	La Ciudad del Fútbol, Las Rozas	Barcelona	Atlético de Madrid	4–1
2018	Estadio Romano, Mérida	Barcelona	Atlético de Madrid	1–0 (a.e.t.)
2019	Nuevo Estadio de Los Cármenes, Granada	Real Sociedad	Atlético de Madrid	2–1
2020	La Rosaleda Stadium, Málaga	**Barcelona**	Logroño	3–0
2021	Municipal de Butarque, Leganés	**Barcelona**	Levante	4–2
2022	Municipal de Santo Domingo, Alcorcón	**Barcelona**	Huelva	6–1
2023	Municipal de Butarque, Leganés	Atlético de Madrid	Real Madrid	2–2 (3–1 p)
2024	La Romareda, Zaragoza	**Barcelona**	Real Sociedad	8–0
2025	El Alcoraz, Huesca	**Barcelona**	Atlético de Madrid	2–0
2026	Gran Canaria, Las Palmas	**Barcelona**	Atlético de Madrid	3–1

== Winners ==
Club	Winners	Runners-up	Winning years
Barcelona	12	2	1994 (Note: Won as Club Femení Barcelona.), 2011, 2013, 2014, 2017, 2018, 2020, 2021, 2022, 2024, 2025, 2026
Espanyol	6	4	1996, 1997, 2006, 2009, 2010, 2012
Levante	6	2	2000, 2001, 2002, 2004, 2005, 2007
Añorga	3	4	1990, 1991, 1993
Oroquieta Villaverde	3	3	1992, 1995, 1999
Karbo	3	0	1983, 1984, 1985
Atlético de Madrid	2	5	2016, 2023
Oiartzun	2	1	1987, 1988
Porvenir	1	2	1986
Sabadell	1	2	2003
Atlético Málaga	1	1	1998 (Note: Currently named Málaga.)
Rayo Vallecano	1	1	2008
Sporting de Huelva	1	1	2015
Real Sociedad	1	1	2019
Parque Alcobendas	1	0	1989
Lagunak	0	3	
Puebla	0	2	
Transportes Alcaine	0	2	
Athletic Club	0	2	
Peña Barcilona	0	1	
Eibartarrak	0	1	
Estudiantes Huelva	0	1	
Valencia	0	1	
Logroño	0	1	
Real Madrid	0	1	

Marked in italic those teams that won the league championship that season

== See also ==
- Liga F
- Supercopa de España Femenina
- Women's football in Spain
