= 2010–11 FC Barcelona Femení season =

FC Barcelona Femení
2010–11 season
- Chairman: Sandro Rosell
- Manager: Xavi Llorens
- Stadium: Ciutat Esportiva Joan Gamper
- League: 4th
- Copa de la Reina: Winners
- Copa Catalunya: Winners
- Top goalscorer: Olga García
Home colours	Away colours

The 2010–11 season was the 23rd season of FC Barcelona Femení in official competition, and the 14th in the top flight of Spanish football.

== Overview ==
The Superliga was held in two phases in the 2010–11 season. The first phase was a league of regional groups, with the best-placed teams in each group competing in a top-level league against each other in the second phase. Lower-placed teams competed against each other in a secondary league in the second phase, but this was not a form of relegation.

Barcelona were in group B in the first phase, in which they finished second and progressed to the top league, coming fourth overall. This placement qualified them to compete for the Copa de la Reina, which they won.

They also defended the Copa Catalunya title.

== Players ==
=== First team ===
No.	Pos.	Nat.	Name	Age	Since	App.	Goals
Goalkeepers
	GK	(Spain)	Laura Ràfols	20	2007		0
	GK	(Spain)	Elixabete Sarasola	20	2009		0
Defenders
	DF	(Spain)	Ana María Escribano (captain)	29	2000		
	DF	(Spain)	Melanie Serrano	21	2003		
	DF	(Spain)	Marta Unzué	22	2006		
	DF	(Spain)	Laura Gómez	28	2008		
	DF	(Spain)	Melisa Nicolau	26	2010		
	DF	(Spain)	Esther Romero		2010		
	DF	(Spain)	Anna Márquez				
	DF	(Spain)	Rocío López				
Midfielders
	MF	(Spain)	Vicky Losada	20	2006		
	MF	(Spain)	Carolina Férez	19	2009		
	MF	(Spain)	Noemí Rubio	27	2009		
	MF	(Spain)	Montserrat Tomé	29	2010		
	MF	(Spain)	Laura Gutiérrez Navarro	17	2010		
Forwards
	FW	(Spain)	Mari Paz Vilas	23	2008		
	FW	(Spain)	Marta Corredera	19	2010		
	FW	(Spain)	Olga García	19	2010		
	FW	(Spain)	Sandra Jiménez "Avión"		2010		
	FW	(Spain)	Elba Unzué				
	FW	(Spain)	Marta Liria "Lilo"				

- Last updated: 19 June 2011
- Source: BDFutbol FC Barcelona
- Ordered by arrival.

=== Reserve team ===
Note: Flags indicate national team as defined under FIFA eligibility rules; some limited exceptions apply. Players may hold more than one non-FIFA nationality.

No.	Pos.	Nation	Player
—	GK	ESP	Míriam de Francisco Rodríguez "Mimi"
—	DF	ESP	Leila Ouahabi
—	MF	ESP	Zaira Flores
—			Lara

== Transfers ==
=== In ===
No.	Pos.	Nat.	Player	Moving from	Source
Summer
	MF	(Spain)	Montserrat Tomé	Levante UD	
	DF	(Spain)	Melisa Nicolau	Rayo Vallecano	
	DF	(Spain)	Esther Romero		
	FW	(Spain)	Marta Corredera	RCD Espanyol	
	FW	(Spain)	Sandra Jiménez "Avión"		

=== Out ===
No.	Pos.	Nat.	Player	Moving to	Source
Summer
			Clara Villanueva		
	MF	(Spain)	Silvia Doblado	Las Palmas	
	FW	(Spain)	Marta Cubí	Sant Gabriel	
			Anna Riera		
			Laura Bonaventura "Mixeta"		
		(Spain)	Alicia Fuentes	Atlético Málaga	
			Marina Torras		

== Pre-season and friendlies ==
Barcelona took part in the Torneig d'Històrics del Futbol Català, along with five other historic Catalan teams, on 11 and 12 September 2010. Barcelona used their B team, who drew 1–1 against UE L'Estartit in the semi-final but did not proceed after losing out in a play-off. The play-off was two matches, with both Barcelona B and L'Estartit playing hosts FC Martinenc to see which team could score more: against Martinenc, Barcelona B scored three goals to L'Estartit's seven.

== Competitions ==
Win Draw Loss

=== Copa Catalunya ===
28 August 2010 Semifinal	Barcelona	0–0 (4–3 p)	Espanyol	Sant Joan Despí
				Stadium: Municipal de Les Planes
Note: Barcelona advance on penalties

29 August 2010 Final	Barcelona	3–0	UE L'Estartit	Sant Joan Despí
	Vicky Losada 53'; Elba Unzué 78'; Marta Liria 89'			Stadium: Municipal de Les Planes

=== League ===
==== Phase 1: Group B ====
5 September 2010 1	CE Sant Gabriel	2–4	Barcelona	Sant Adrià de Besòs
	Villagrasa; Cristina	Report	Avión; Ana; Olga García	Stadium: Estadi José Luis Ruiz Casado

19 September 2010 2	Barcelona	2–0	Valencia	Sant Joan Despí
	Marta Corredera 35'; Carol 63'	Report		Stadium: Ciutat Esportiva Joan Gamper

26 September 2010 3	UE L'Estartit	2–3	Barcelona	L'Estartit
	Maribel 26', 32'	Report	Olga García 51', 90'; Ana 63'	Stadium: Camp Municipal; Referee: Ana Zardaín López

3 October 2010 4	Barcelona	1–0	Espanyol	Sant Joan Despí
	Olga García 64'	Report		Stadium: Ciutat Esportiva Joan Gamper; Referee: Raúl Calle Martínez

9 October 2010 5	Levante	1–2	Barcelona	Valencia
	Conti 54'	Report	Avión 48'; Melanie Serrano 58'	Stadium: Poliesportiu de Nazaret; Referee: Almendros Zafra

17 October 2010 6	Barcelona	4–0	UD Collerense	Sant Joan Despí
	Montse 16'; Olga García 40'; Melanie Serrano 70'; Mari Paz 80'	Report		Stadium: Ciutat Esportiva Joan Gamper; Referee: Juan Manuel Martín

24 October 2010 7	Gimnàstic Tarragona	1–4	Barcelona	Tarragona
	Sonia Galiano 55'	Report	Olga García 16'; Vicky Losada 32'; Marta Corredera 42'; Noemí 88'	Stadium: Estadi Sant Pere i Sant Pau

31 October 2010 8	Barcelona	1–2	CE Sant Gabriel	Sant Joan Despí
	Vicky Losada 6'	Report	Villagrasa 17'; Dori 77'	Stadium: Ciutat Esportiva Joan Gamper

7 November 2010 9	Valencia	1–3	Barcelona	Valencia
	Trueno 8'	Report	Vicky Losada 6', 37'; Olga García 28'	Stadium: Beniferri; Referee: Sanz Terrades

14 November 2010 10	Barcelona	0–0	UE L'Estartit	Sant Joan Despí
		Report		Stadium: Ciutat Esportiva Joan Gamper; Referee: Gallardo Martínez

21 November 2010 11	Espanyol	3–1	Barcelona	Sant Adrià del Besòs
	Vero Boquete 10', 76', 92'	Report	Carol 89'	Stadium: Ciutat Esportiva de Sant Adrià; Referee: Daniel Gracia Álvarez

28 November 2010 12	Barcelona	2–0	Levante	Sant Joan Despí
	Noemí 49' (pen.); Olga García 71'	Report		Stadium: Ciutat Esportiva Joan Gamper; Referee: Rodríguez Portoles

5 December 2010 13	UD Collerense	1–0	Barcelona	Ca'n Caimari
	Mascaró 90'	Report		Stadium: Camp Municipal Coll d'en Rebassa; Referee: Reus Vidal

12 December 2010 14	Barcelona	13–0	Gimnàstic Tarragona	Sant Joan Despí
	Noemí 7' (pen.); Lilo 20', 40', 55'; Olga García 24', 28', 43', 59'; Melanie Serrano 48'; Romi 50' (pen.); Marta Corredera 80'; Mari Paz 81' (pen.), 86'	Report		Stadium: Ciutat Esportiva Joan Gamper; Referee: Ávalos Barrera

==== Phase 2: Group A ====
6 January 2011 1	Atlético Madrid	0–1	Barcelona	Majadahonda
		Report	Olga García 87'	Stadium: Cerro del Espino; Referee: Basilio Puerta

9 January 2011 2	Barcelona	1–1	Real Sociedad	Sant Joan Despí
	Ramajo 65' (o.g.)	Report	Larraitz 80' (pen.)	Stadium: Ciutat Esportiva Joan Gamper; Referee: Liarte Pérez

16 January 2011 3	Rayo Vallecano	1–0	Barcelona	Madrid
	Natalia Pablos 75'	Report		Stadium: Ciudad Deportiva Fundación Rayo Vallecano; Referee: Beatriz Gil Gozalo

23 January 2011 4	Barcelona	3–0	CE Sant Gabriel	Sant Joan Despí
	Montse 23'; Olga García 40'; Noemí 49'	Report		Stadium: Ciutat Esportiva Joan Gamper

30 January 2011 5	Barcelona	0–0	Zaragoza CFF	Sant Joan Despí
		Report		Stadium: Ciutat Esportiva Joan Gamper; Referee: José Antonio Salas

5 February 2011 6	RCD Espanyol	1–0	Barcelona	Sant Adrià del Besòs
	Vero Boquete 7'	Report		Stadium: Ciutat Esportiva de Sant Adrià; Referee: José Emilio Sánchez Aparicio

13 February 2011 7	Barcelona	2–1	Athletic Club	Sant Joan Despí
	Olga García 7'; Marta Liria 80'	Report	Nekane 41'	Stadium: Ciutat Esportiva Joan Gamper; Referee: Ávalos Martos

27 February 2011 8	Barcelona	2–2	Atlético Madrid	Sant Joan Despí
	Olga García 50'; Marta Corredera 89'	Report	Prim 7'; Szymanowski 35'	Stadium: Ciutat Esportiva Joan Gamper; Referee: Alejandro Fernández

6 March 2011 9	Real Sociedad	0–0	Barcelona	Zubieta
		Report		Stadium: Zubieta Facilities; Referee: Etxarri Losantos

13 March 2011 10	Barcelona	0–1	Rayo Vallecano	Sant Joan Despí
		Report	Adriana 89'	Stadium: Ciutat Esportiva Joan Gamper; Referee: Víctor Manuel Sánchez Rico

20 March 2011 11	CE Sant Gabriel	3–0	Barcelona	Sant Adrià de Besòs
	Dori 31'; Villagrasa 46'; Marta Cubí 69'	Report		Stadium: Estadi José Luis Ruiz Casado

27 March 2011 12	Zaragoza CFF	1–2	Barcelona	Zaragoza
	Mariela 77'	Report	Ani 78'; Olga García 87' (pen.)	Stadium: Estadio Pedro Sancho; Referee: Rafael Aranda

10 April 2011 13	Barcelona	1–2	Espanyol	Sant Joan Despí
	Marta Corredera 1'	Report	Vero Boquete 41' (pen.), 85'	Stadium: Ciutat Esportiva Joan Gamper; Referee: Abraham Martínez Sáez

17 April 2011 14	Athletic Club	0–1	Barcelona	Bilbao
		Report	Noemí 56'	Stadium: Lezama Facilities; Referee: Aretxabaleta Sarasola

=== Copa de la Reina ===
1 May 2011 Round 1, Leg 1	Barcelona	4–1	SD Reocín	Sant Joan Despí
	Montse 65'; Olga García 66'; Ana 80', 84'	Report	Claudia 35'	Stadium: Ciutat Esportiva Joan Gamper; Referee: Óscar Sauleda Torrent

8 May 2011 Round 1, Leg 2	SD Reocín	0–3	Barcelona	Reocín
		Report	Olga García 56'; Noemí 75'; Lilo 80'	Stadium: Estadio Pepín Cadelo; Referee: Javier Toca Alonso

15 May 2011 Quarterfinal, Leg 1	Barcelona	2–0	Rayo Vallecano	Sant Joan Despí
	Olga García 10'; Marta Corredera 15'	Report		Stadium: Ciutat Esportiva Joan Gamper; Referee: Francesc Galán Baró

22 May 2011 Quarterfinal, Leg 2	Rayo Vallecano	1–2	Barcelona	Madrid
	?	Report	Olga García 4', 11'	Stadium: Ciudad Deportiva Fundación Rayo Vallecano; Referee: Dámaso Cuesta Ferreiro

17 June 2011 Semifinal	Real Sociedad	0–2	Barcelona	Las Rozas
		Report	Marta Corredera 52'; Noemí 77'	Stadium: Ciudad del Fútbol de Las Rozas; Referee: Giz Gozalo

19 June 2011 Final	Barcelona	1–0 (a.e.t.)	Espanyol	Las Rozas
	Olga García 107'	Report		Stadium: Ciudad del Fútbol de Las Rozas; Referee: Valentín Pizarro Gómez
