= 2009–10 FC Barcelona Femení season =

FC Barcelona Femení
2009–10 season
- Chairman: Joan Laporta
- Manager: Xavi Llorens
- Stadium: Ciutat Esportiva Joan Gamper
- League: 5th
- Copa de la Reina: 3rd
- Copa Catalunya: Winners
- Top goalscorer: Marta Cubí (13)
Home colours	Away colours

The 2009–10 season was the 22nd for FC Barcelona Femení in official competition, and the 13th in the top flight of Spanish football.

== Summary ==
In 2009, FC Barcelona sought to expand its brand into North America, to attract more female fans, and to promote the image of the women's team; one possibility explored to try to achieve all three was to collaborate with American football star Mia Hamm, who would have acted as a representative of Barcelona Femení.

Towards the end of the previous season, rivals Espanyol had disciplined player Noemí Rubio, removing her from team training and barring her from playing, after she was photographed wearing a Barcelona scarf at the 2009 Copa del Rey final. The issue became polemic news when Espanyol publicly announced their sanctions towards Rubio; their own and other fans criticised Espanyol for punishing a player based on the club they support. Espanyol tried to deny this, saying that the punitive measures were taken because they deemed wearing another team's colours to be disrespectful; Espanyol also claimed they had not wanted to draw attention to it. At an Espanyol press conference when the club announced Rubio would not continue with them, she publicly asked for forgiveness. After this, Barcelona "decided to do everything" they could to sign Rubio, which they did on 22 July 2009. Rubio was considered one of the best players in the league. Top-scorer Marta Cubí and former Barcelona youth product Carol Férez also swapped Espanyol for Barcelona in the summer of 2009.

At the start of the season, Barcelona took part in the Copa Catalunya, winning the title for the first time by defeating Espanyol on penalties in the final on 30 August 2009.

The team participated in Group B of the group stage of the Superliga, for Catalan and Valencian teams. With a 1–0 win over UE L'Estartit – scored by Vicky Losada in the 90th minute after dominating the game – on the fourth matchday, Barcelona had taken three wins from three games played. Having won the Copa Catalunya and started off their league campaign well, coach Xavi Llorens felt that the team had the potential to win a treble, though he also acknowledged the lack of professionalism made it hard to maintain a competitive team throughout a whole season.

In the group, they finished second to progress to the top-level second phase and compete for the league title. In the second phase, they were in Group A and finished 5th. This placement also qualified them to participate in the Copa de la Reina, in which they placed third.

On 25 April 2010, Mari Paz Vilas scored the 1,000th league goal for Barcelona, against Zaragoza.

== Players ==
=== First team ===
As of June 2010

Note: Flags indicate national team as defined under FIFA eligibility rules; some limited exceptions apply. Players may hold more than one non-FIFA nationality.

No.	Pos.	Nation	Player
—	GK	(Spain) ESP	Laura Ràfols
—	GK	(Spain) ESP	Elixabete Sarasola
—	DF	(Spain) ESP	Ana María Escribano
—	DF	(Spain) ESP	Laura Gómez
—	DF	(Spain) ESP	Rocío López
—	DF	(Spain) ESP	Marta Unzué
—	DF	(Spain) ESP	Melanie Serrano
—	DF	(Spain) ESP	Esther Romero
—	DF	(Spain) ESP	Clara Villanueva
—	DF	(Spain) ESP	Laura Bonaventura "Mixeta"
—	DF	(Spain) ESP	Marina Torras

No.	Pos.	Nation	Player
—	MF	(Spain) ESP	Vicky Losada
—	MF	(Spain) ESP	Noemí Rubio
—	MF	(Spain) ESP	Carol Férez
—	MF	(Spain) ESP	Silvia Doblado
—	MF	(Spain) ESP	Alicia Fuentes
—	FW	(Spain) ESP	Mari Paz Vilas
—	FW	(Spain) ESP	Elba Unzué
—	FW	(Spain) ESP	Marta Cubí
—	FW	(Spain) ESP	Marta Liria "Lilo"
—	FW	(Spain) ESP	Anna Riera

=== Reserve team ===
Players from FC Barcelona Femení B

Note: Flags indicate national team as defined under FIFA eligibility rules; some limited exceptions apply. Players may hold more than one non-FIFA nationality.

No. / Pos. / Nation / Player; — / DF / (Spain) ESP / Anna Márquez "Anita"	No. / Pos. / Nation / Player; — / FW / (Spain) ESP / Olga García

== Transfers ==
=== In ===
No.	Pos.	Nat.	Player	Moving from	Source
Summer
	GK	(Spain)	Elixabete Sarasola	Real Sociedad	
	DF	(Spain)	Rocío López	Apolo Properties	
	MF	(Spain)	Noemí Rubio	RCD Espanyol	
	MF	(Spain)	Carol Férez	RCD Espanyol	
	FW	(Spain)	Marta Cubí	RCD Espanyol	
	FW	(Spain)	Anna Riera	UE L'Estartit	

=== Out ===
No.	Pos.	Nat.	Player	Moving to	Source
Summer
	GK	(Spain)	Cristina Molina	Levante Las Planas	
	DF	(Spain)	Sheila Sanchón	Retired	
	DF	(Spain)	Silvia Vila	Espanyol B	
	MF	(Spain)	Paulina Ferré	Retired	
	FW	(Spain)	Jessica Todó		
	FW	(Spain)	Marta Yáñez	Espanyol B	
	FW	(Spain)	Laura Carriba	Espanyol B	
	FW	(Spain)	Aída García	UE L'Estartit	
	FW	(Spain)	Patricia Martínez	CD Ponferrada	

== Pre-season and friendlies ==
=== Torneig d'Històrics ===
This was Barcelona's first time participating in the Torneig d'Històrics; the women's competition had been introduced the previous year but featured only one match, the final between Espanyol and L'Estartit.

8 August 2009 Final	Espanyol	0–0 (4–2 p)	Barcelona	Barcelona
12:00	Vero (yellow card) 61'; Ane (yellow card) 81'			Stadium: Camp Municipal Narcís Sala; Referee: Mireia Gil

=== Torneig Sport Mundi ===
22 August 2009 Semifinals	Real Sociedad	0–0 (– p)	Barcelona	Hondarribia
		Report
Note: Barcelona wins in penalty shoot-out

23 August 2009 Final	Levante	2–1	Barcelona	Irún
14:00	González 2'; Ves 14'		? 90'	Stadium: Stadium Gal

=== Friendlies ===
(20?) September 2009 Friendly	Barcelona A	18–1	Barcelona C
		Report
Note: In another Barcelona women's friendly, the B team beat Lloret 8–0.

=== Torneig de Getxo ===
2 April 2010 Group stage 2	Zaragoza	0–5	Barcelona	Getxo
		Report		Stadium: Estadi de Bolue

2 April 2010 Group stage 3	Rayo Vallecano	1–0	Barcelona	Getxo
		Report		Stadium: Estadi de Bolue

3 April 2010 3rd place match	Athletic Club	0–1	Barcelona	Getxo
		Report		Stadium: Estadi de Bolue

== Competitions ==
Win Draw Loss

=== Copa Catalunya ===
28 August 2009 Semifinal	Barcelona	6–0	FC Les Preses	L'Estartit
	Marta Cubí 3'; Anna Riera 19'; Vicky Losada 23'; Alicia 49'; Clara Villanueva 61'; Laura Bonaventura 67'	Report		Stadium: Municipal de l'Estartit; Referee: Òscar Sauleda

30 August 2009 Final	Barcelona	3–3 (7–6 p)	Espanyol	L'Estartit
	Marta Cubí 20', 71'; Melanie 65'	Report	Torrejón 13'; Joana Montouto 16'; Sara Serna 80' (pen.)	Stadium: Municipal de L'Estartit; Referee: José Emilio Sánchez Aparicio

=== League ===
==== Phase 1: Group B ====
6 September 2009 1	Barcelona	3–1	UD Collerense	Sant Joan Despí
	Melanie Serrano 7'; Marta Cubí 70'; Ani 90'	Report	Pili Espadas 51'	Stadium: Ciutat Esportiva Joan Gamper; Referee: Jordi Liarte Pérez

13 September 2009 2	~~Murcia~~	w/o	~~Barcelona~~
Note: Murcia had withdrawn from competition, and matches scheduled against them were then used as rest days.

27 September 2009 3	Gimnàstic Tarragona	0–4	Barcelona	Tarragona
19:30			Marta Cubí 30'; Melanie Serrano 40'; Vicky Losada 75', 77'	Stadium: Estadi Sant Pere i Sant Pau; Referee: Pablo Querol

4 October 2009 4	Barcelona	1–0	UE L'Estartit	Sant Joan Despí
11:00	Vicky Losada 90'			Stadium: Ciutat Esportiva Joan Gamper; Referee: Josep Barrera

11 October 2009 5	Valencia	0–2	Barcelona	Valencia
12:00			Elba 30'; Vicky Losada 88'	Stadium: El Planter; Referee: Ros Calvo

18 October 2009 6	Barcelona	1–0	Levante	Sant Joan Despí
12:30	Anna 28'			Stadium: Ciutat Esportiva Joan Gamper; Referee: Dani Gracia Álvarez

31 October 2009 7	Espanyol	1–1	Barcelona	Sant Adrià del Besòs
16:00	Chola 28'		Marta Unzué 94'	Stadium: Ciutat Esportiva de Sant Adrià; Referee: Francesc Galán Baró

8 November 2009 8	UD Collerense	1–0	Barcelona	Palma
11:30	Torrecilla 68'			Stadium: Camp Municipal Coll d'en Rebassa; Referee: Sebastián Ripoll Solano

15 November 2009 9	~~Barcelona~~	w/o	~~Murcia~~
Note: Murcia had withdrawn from competition, and matches scheduled against them were then used as rest days.

29 November 2009 10	Barcelona	7–0	Gimnàstic Tarragona	Sant Joan Despí
12:00	Elba 19'; Marta Unzué 40', 88'; Noemí 44'; Clara 78'; Carol 82', 84'			Stadium: Ciutat Esportiva Joan Gamper; Referee: Ávalos Barrera

5 December 2009 11	UE L'Estartit	1–2	Barcelona	L'Estartit
12:00	Maribel 15'		Alicia 53'; Marta Cubí 62'	Stadium: Camp Municipal; Referee: Brunner López

8 December 2009 12	Barcelona	4–1	Valencia	Sant Joan Despí
	Marta Cubí 65', 67'; Melanie Serrano 75'; Anna 90'	Report	Aran 15'	Stadium: Ciutat Esportiva Joan Gamper; Referee: Albert Ávalos

13 December 2009 13	Levante	0–0	Barcelona	Valencia
12:00				Stadium: Poliesportiu de Nazaret; Referee: Monfort González

20 December 2009 14	Barcelona	1–2	Espanyol	Sant Joan Despí
12:00	Marta Cubí 75'		Lara 30'; Conti 41'	Stadium: Ciutat Esportiva Joan Gamper

==== Phase 2: Group A ====
10 January 2010 1	Atlético Madrid	0–0	Barcelona	Majadahonda
		Report		Stadium: Cerro del Espino; Referee: Luis Miguel Martínez Montoro

17 January 2010 2	Barcelona	2–0	Athletic Club	Sant Joan Despí
	Noemí 8', 83' (pen.)	Report		Stadium: Ciutat Esportiva Joan Gamper; Referee: Raúl Calle Martínez

24 January 2010 3	Rayo Vallecano	3–1	Barcelona	Madrid
	Natalia Pablos 65'; Gimbert 71'; Adriana 75'	Report	Marta Cubí 21'	Stadium: Nuestra Señora de la Torre; Referee: Carlos López Rodríguez

31 January 2010 4	Barcelona	1–0	Levante	Sant Joan Despí
	Marta Cubí 17'	Report		Stadium: Ciutat Esportiva Joan Gamper; Referee: Dídac Duran Peidro

7 February 2010 5	Barcelona	4–0	Real Sociedad	Sant Joan Despí
	Marta Cubí 12', 92'; Lau 35'; Unzué 72'	Report		Stadium: Ciutat Esportiva Joan Gamper; Referee: Abraham Martínez Sáez

14 February 2010 6	Espanyol	4–0	Barcelona	Sant Adrià del Besòs
	Míriam 40'; Vero Boquete 60'; Conti 66'; Torrejón 69'	Report		Stadium: Ciutat Esportiva de Sant Adrià; Referee: Juan Manuel Martín Varas

21 February 2010 7	Barcelona	3–1	Zaragoza CFF	Sant Joan Despí
	Unzué 10'; Lilo 48'; Marta Cubí 79'	Report	Marieta 14'	Stadium: Ciutat Esportiva Joan Gamper; Referee: Daniel Gracia Álvarez

28 February 2010 8	Barcelona	0–1	Atlético Madrid	Sant Joan Despí
		Report	Pili 21'	Stadium: Ciutat Esportiva Joan Gamper; Referee: Carlos Gallardo Martínez

7 March 2010 9	Athletic Club	4–0	Barcelona	Bilbao
	Gurutze 5', 40'; Olabarrieta 15'; Irune Murua 35'	Report		Stadium: Lezama Facilities; Referee: Aimar Velasco Arbaiza

14 March 2010 10	Barcelona	1–4	Rayo Vallecano	Sant Joan Despí
	Melanie Serrano 29'	Report	Jade 10'; Adriana 20', 57'; Soni 90'	Stadium: Ciutat Esportiva Joan Gamper; Referee: Carlos Rodríguez Enrique

21 March 2010 11	Levante	0–0	Barcelona	Valencia
		Report		Stadium: Poliesportiu de Nazaret; Referee: Miguel Ros Calvo

11 April 2010 12	Real Sociedad	1–3	Barcelona	Zubieta
	Herrero 9'	Report	Elba 14'; Mari Paz 85'; Lilo 91'	Stadium: Zubieta Facilities; Referee: Jon Etxarri Los Santos

18 April 2010 13	Barcelona	0–2	Espanyol	Sant Joan Despí
		Report	Vero Boquete 14'; Torrejón 89'	Stadium: Ciutat Esportiva Joan Gamper; Referee: Ramón Torralba Jiménez

25 April 2010 14	Zaragoza CFF	2–1	Barcelona	Zaragoza
	Ana Borges 73'; Marieta 88'	Report	Mari Paz 37'	Stadium: Estadio Pedro Sancho; Referee: Mouhamed Ndiaye

=== Copa de la Reina ===
2 May 2010 Round of 16, Leg 1	UD Collerense	2–1	Barcelona	Palma
	Rafaela 19'; Torrecilla 55'	Report	Lilo 57'	Stadium: Camp Municipal Coll d'en Rebassa; Referee: Santos Arenas Cuesta

9 May 2010 Round of 16, Leg 2	Barcelona	2–0	UD Collerense	Sant Joan Despí
	Olga García 20'; Marta Cubí 80'	Report		Stadium: Ciutat Esportiva Joan Gamper; Referee: Tomás Baulo
Note: Barcelona advance 3–2 on aggregate.

16 May 2010 Quarterfinal, Leg 1	Barcelona	1–0	Athletic Club	Sant Joan Despí
	1-0 Elba 41'	Report		Stadium: Ciutat Esportiva Joan Gamper; Referee: Martínez Sáez

23 May 2010 Quarterfinal, Leg 2	Athletic Club	0–2	Barcelona	Bilbao
		Report	0-1 Olga García 71'; 0-2 Melanie Serrano 79'	Stadium: San Mamés; Referee: Isturiz Latorre

2 June 2010 Semifinal	Espanyol	1–0	Barcelona	Basauri
	1-0 Mery 70'	Report		Stadium: Camp Artunduaga; Referee: Ander Zarrabeitia Arrieta

4 June 2010 3rd place play-off	Barcelona	3–0	Torrejón	Basauri
	1-0 Ani 48', 2-0 Doblado 88', 3-0 Marta Cubí 91'	Report		Stadium: Camp Artunduaga; Referee: Aretxabaleta Sarasola
