= 2008–09 FC Barcelona Femení season =

FC Barcelona Femení
2008–09 season
- Chairman: Joan Laporta
- Manager: Xavi Llorens
- Stadium: Ciutat Esportiva Joan Gamper
- League: 6th
- Copa de la Reina: Semifinals
- Copa Catalunya: Runner-up
- Top goalscorer: League: Mari Paz Vilas (13); All: Mari Paz Vilas (14)
Home colours	Away colours

The 2008–09 season was the 21st for FC Barcelona Femení in official competition, and the 12th in the top flight of Spanish football. Returning to the top flight after one season in the national league, Barcelona finished in the top half of the league table as well as reaching the semi-finals of the Copa de la Reina de Fútbol.

== Summary ==
Ahead of the 2008–09 Superliga season, Barcelona was promoted to the league (the top flight) from the secondary Liga Nacional; they had been relegated in 2007 and reinforced their team going forwards, so were considered stronger than most newly-promoted teams and competition for Clásico rivals Atlético Madrid. Barcelona was expected to not only strive to stay in the league, but to aim for the top league positions and challenge for the Copa de la Reina. Halfway through the season, they were comfortably in the top half of the league.

The tactical play of the team was recognised, with Mundo Deportivo comparing it directly to the style of the FC Barcelona men's team being newly implemented under Pep Guardiola and suggesting the women's team also benefitted from Guardiola being named manager of the men's team.

Vicky Losada had left Barcelona when they were relegated, joining local rivals Espanyol, who remained in the top flight; when Barcelona were promoted after one season, Losada reached an agreement with Espanyol to terminate her contract.

The team finished sixth in the Superliga, qualifying them to compete in the Copa de la Reina, in which they reached the semi-finals. They were runners-up in the Copa Catalunya, losing in the final against Espanyol.

== Players ==
As of June 2009

Note: Flags indicate national team as defined under FIFA eligibility rules; some limited exceptions apply. Players may hold more than one non-FIFA nationality.

No.	Pos.	Nation	Player
—	GK	ESP	Laura Ràfols
—	GK	ESP	Cristina Molina
—	DF	ESP	Ana María Escribano
—	DF	ESP	Laura Gómez
—	DF	ESP	Sheila Sanchón
—	DF	ESP	Marta Unzué
—	DF	ESP	Melanie Serrano
—	DF	ESP	Esther Romero
—	DF	ESP	Clara Villanueva
—	DF	ESP	Laura Bonaventura "Mixeta"
—	DF	ESP	Marina Torras
—	MF	ESP	Vicky Losada

No.	Pos.	Nation	Player
—	MF	ESP	Paulina Ferré
—	MF	ESP	Silvia Doblado
—	MF	ESP	Alicia Fuentes
—	FW	ESP	Mari Paz Vilas
—	FW	ESP	Elba Unzué
—	FW	ESP	Marta Yánez
—	FW	ESP	Marta Liria "Lilo"
—	FW	ESP	Laura Carriba
—	FW	ESP	Jessica Todo
—	FW	ESP	Aida Garcia
—	FW	ESP	Silvia Vila
—	FW	ESP	Patricia Martínez

== Transfers ==
=== In ===
No.	Pos.	Nat.	Player	Moving from	Source
Summer
	DF	(Spain)	Laura Gómez	Real Sociedad	
	DF	(Spain)	Marina Torras	UE L'Estartit	
	MF	(Spain)	Silvia Doblado	Apolo Murcia	
	MF	(Spain)	Alicia Fuentes	Apolo Murcia	
	MF	(Spain)	Vicky Losada	Espanyol	
	FW	(Spain)	Mari Paz Vilas	Levante	
	FW	(Spain)	Laura Carriba	Barcelona B	

=== Out ===
No.	Pos.	Nat.	Player	Moving to	Source
Summer
	DF	(Spain)	Sarai Lucha	Retired	
	DF	(Spain)	Verónica Navarro	Retired	
	DF	(Spain)	Cynthia Pidal	Sant Andreu	
	DF	(Spain)	Zaida González	Sporting de Huelva	
	MF	(Spain)	Alba Mena	Sant Gabriel	
	FW	(Spain)	Sandra Jiménez "Avión"	Sporting de Huelva	
	FW	(Spain)	Cristina Macho		

== Pre-season and friendlies ==
=== Sport Mundi Tournament ===
23 August 2008 Semifinals	Athletic Club	0–0 (– p)	Barcelona	Hondarribia
Note: Barcelona wins in penalty shoot-out

24 August 2008 Final	Real Sociedad	0–0 (5–3 p)	Barcelona	Irún
12:30				Stadium: Stadium Gal
Note: Real Sociedad wins in penalty shootout

=== Friendlies ===
(28?) September 2008 Friendly	Levante Las Planas	0–11	Barcelona A
		Report

=== Torneig de Getxo ===
18 April 2009 Group B, match 1	Barcelona	3–0	Oviedo Moderno	Getxo
		Report		Stadium: Estadi de Bolue

18 April 2009 Group B, match 3	Rayo Vallecano	3–1	Barcelona	Getxo
		Report		Stadium: Estadi de Bolue

19 April 2009 Third place play-off	Zaragoza	0–1	Barcelona	Getxo
		Report		Stadium: Estadi de Bolue

=== Salou International Women's Tournament ===
16 May 2009 Group stage	v	Salou
	Report

16 May 2009 Group stage	v	Salou
	Report

17 May 2009 Third place play-off	Barcelona	1–1 (4–3 p)	Atlético Madrid	Salou
10:00	? 4'		? 19'
Note: Barcelona win third place on penalties

== Competitions ==
Win Draw Loss

=== Copa Catalunya ===
30 August 2008 Semifinal	UE L'Estartit	0–1	Barcelona	Vic
		Report	1-0 Alba (39')	Stadium: Estadi Municipal de Vic; Referee: Carlos Gallardo Martínez

11 September 2008 Final	Barcelona	0–2	Espanyol	Vic
		Report	Marta Cubí 50'; Silvia Meseguer 71'	Stadium: Estadi Municipal de Vic; Referee: Jennifer Sanz Higuero

=== League ===
==== First split ====
7 September 2008 1	Atlético Madrid	1–0	Barcelona	Majadahonda
	1-0 Luky 65'	Report		Stadium: Cerro del Espino; Referee: Yuste Heredero

14 September 2008 2	Barcelona	3–0	Real Sociedad	Sant Joan Despí
	Patri 25'; Vicky Losada 64'; Jessica 73'	Report		Stadium: Ciutat Esportiva Joan Gamper; Referee: Díaz Rubio

5 October 2008 3	Levante	4–0	Barcelona	Valencia
	1-0 Laura del Río 32', 2-0 Conti 52', 3-0 Goretti 62', 4-0 Laura del Río 75'	Report		Stadium: Poliesportiu de Nazaret; Referee: Monfort González

12 October 2008 4	Barcelona	2–0	AD Torrejón	Sant Joan Despí
	Patri 54'; Lilo 93'	Report		Stadium: Ciutat Esportiva Joan Gamper; Referee: Alfonso Oliva Bueno

19 October 2008 5	Extremadura	0–1	Barcelona	Almendralejo
		Report	Patri 68'	Stadium: Estadi Francisco de la Hera; Referee: Manuel Ángel Moruno Gala

2 November 2008 6	Barcelona	0–0	UE L'Estartit	Sant Joan Despí
		Report		Stadium: Ciutat Esportiva Joan Gamper; Referee: Duran Peiró

9 November 2008 7	Barcelona	4–0	Málaga	Sant Joan Despí
	Mari Paz 23', 82'; Ani 43'; Aida 85'	Report		Stadium: Ciutat Esportiva Joan Gamper; Referee: Sánchez Rico

16 November 2008 8	Sporting Club de Huelva	1–1	Barcelona	Huelva
	1-1 Rivi 79'	Report	Marina 72'	Stadium: Federación Onubense de Fútbol; Referee: Núñez García

23 November 2008 9	Barcelona	1–0	AD Colegio Alemán	Sant Joan Despí
	Mari Paz 56'	Report		Stadium: Ciutat Esportiva Joan Gamper; Referee: Rebollo López

30 November 2008 10	Lagunak	0–3	Barcelona	Barañáin
		Report	Vicky Losada 31'; Melanie Serrano 38' (pen.); Marina 74'	Stadium: Servicio Municipal Lagunak

6 December 2008 11	Barcelona	0–2	Espanyol	Sant Joan Despí
		Report	Noemí 57' (pen.); Míriam 78'	Stadium: Ciutat Esportiva Joan Gamper; Referee: Raúl Martínez Calle

14 December 2008 12	Zaragoza	1–0	Barcelona	Zaragoza
	1-0 Mariela 23'	Report		Stadium: Estadio Pedro Sancho; Referee: Mouhamed Ndiaye

21 December 2008 13	Barcelona	0–0	Rayo Vallecano	Sant Joan Despí
		Report		Stadium: Ciutat Esportiva Joan Gamper

3 January 2009 14	Athletic Club	0–0	Barcelona	Bilbao
		Report		Stadium: Lezama Facilities; Referee: Vicandi Garrido

11 January 2009 15	Barcelona	4–0	Pozuelo	Sant Joan Despí
	Mari Paz 8' (pen.); Melanie Serrano 25'; Aída 32'; Alicia 75'	Report		Stadium: Ciutat Esportiva Joan Gamper

==== Second split ====
18 January 2009 16	Barcelona	2–0	Atlético Madrid	Sant Joan Despí
	Marta Carro 53' (o.g.); Mari Paz 74'	Report		Stadium: Ciutat Esportiva Joan Gamper; Referee: Torralba Jiménez

25 January 2009 17	Real Sociedad	1–1	Barcelona	Zubieta
	1-1 Ramajo 89'	Report	Vicky Losada 17'	Stadium: Zubieta Facilities; Referee: Sagués Oscoz

1 February 2009 18	Barcelona	1–1	Levante	Sant Joan Despí
	Carriba 75'	Report	0-1 Peque 22'	Stadium: Ciutat Esportiva Joan Gamper; Referee: David Tomás Bauló

8 February 2009 19	AD Torrejón	2–2	Barcelona	Torrejón de Ardoz
	1-0 Olga 46', 2-2 Ester 78'	Report	Mari Paz 65'; Elba 77'	Stadium: Camp Las Veredillas; Referee: Sánchez Mateo

15 February 2009 20	Barcelona	2–0	Extremadura	Sant Joan Despí
	Mari Paz 26' (pen.), 38'	Report		Stadium: Ciutat Esportiva Joan Gamper; Referee: Díaz Gómez

22 February 2009 21	UE L'Estartit	2–3	Barcelona	L'Estartit
	Anna Martí 48'; Sara Tui 90'	Report	Melanie Serrano 2'; Mari Paz 50'; Clara 92'	Stadium: Camp Municipal de L'Estartit; Referee: Alfonso Oliva Bueno

1 March 2009 22	Málaga	0–3	Barcelona	Málaga
		Report	Mari Paz 6', 40'; Unzué 70'	Referee: Velasco

8 March 2009 23	Barcelona	0–2	Sporting de Huelva	Sant Joan Despí
		Report	0-1 Laura Rus 28', 0-2 Priscila 86'	Stadium: Ciutat Esportiva Joan Gamper; Referee: Llorente Lluch

15 March 2009 24	AD Colegio Alemán	2–1	Barcelona	Valencia
	1-0 Marta Mateos 19', 2-1 Aran 64	Report	Sheila 34'	Stadium: Tarongers; Referee: Ruiz García

22 March 2009 25	Barcelona	3–0	Lagunak	Sant Joan Despí
	Marina 33'; Sheila 51' (pen.); Elba 89'	Report		Stadium: Ciutat Esportiva Joan Gamper; Referee: Rodríguez

29 March 2009 26	Espanyol	2–3	Barcelona	Sant Adrià del Besòs
	Noemí 37' (pen.); Adriana 85'	Report	Unzué 47'; Vicky Losada 48'; Alicia 78'	Stadium: Ciutat Esportiva de Sant Adrià; Referee: César Otal González

5 April 2009 27	Barcelona	0–3	Zaragoza	Sant Joan Despí
		Report	0-1 Clarisa 15', 0-2 Mayte 86', 0-3 Marieta 91'	Stadium: Ciutat Esportiva Joan Gamper; Referee: Daniel Gracia Álvarez

12 April 2009 28	Rayo Vallecano	4–1	Barcelona	Madrid
	Soni 24', 36', 43', 53'	Report	Vicky Losada 29'	Stadium: Nuestra Señora de la Torre; Referee: Marín Castro

1 May 2009 29	Barcelona	3–4	Athletic Club	Sant Joan Despí
	Ani 35'; Melanie Serrano 46' (pen.); Elba 80'	Report	Erika Vázquez 3' (pen.), 26', 84' (pen.); Iraia 81' (pen.)	Stadium: Ciutat Esportiva Joan Gamper; Referee: Simón del Pino

10 May 2009 30	Pozuelo	0–4	Barcelona	Pozuelo de Alarcón
		Report	Mari Paz 32', 60'; Lilo 75', 85'	Stadium: Los Escolapios; Referee: Villanueva de Felipe

=== Copa de la Reina ===
24 May 2009 Quarterfinal, Leg 1	Athletic Club	2–1	Barcelona	Bilbao
	Erika Vázquez 17'; Eli Ibarra 84'	Report	Melanie Serrano 5'	Stadium: Lezama Facilities; Referee: González Esteban

30 May 2009 Quarterfinal, Leg 2	Barcelona	3–0	Athletic Club	Sant Joan Despí
	Mari Paz 8', 45'; Melanie Serrano 24'	Report		Stadium: Ciutat Esportiva Joan Gamper; Referee: Sánchez Aparicio

7 June 2009 Semifinals, Leg 1	Zaragoza	3–1	Barcelona	Zaragoza
	1-0 Marieta 11', 2-0 Julia 15', 3-0 Marieta 19'	Report	Melanie Serrano 47' (pen.)	Stadium: Estadio Pedro Sancho; Referee: Navarro Polo

14 June 2009 Semifinals, Leg 2	Barcelona	1–3	Zaragoza	Sant Joan Despí
	Melanie Serrano 90'	Report	0-1 Marieta 25', 0-2 Cláudia Neto 60', 0-3 Cláudia Neto 67'	Stadium: Ciutat Esportiva Joan Gamper; Referee: Rebollo López
