= 2021–22 FC Barcelona Femení season =

Barcelona Femení
2021–22 season
- President: Joan Laporta
- Head coach: Jonatan Giráldez
- Stadium: Estadi Johan Cruyff
- Primera División: Winner
- Copa de la Reina: Winner
- Supercopa de España: Winner
- UEFA Champions League: Runners-up
- Top goalscorer: League: Asisat Oshoala (20); All: Alexia Putellas (34)
- Highest home attendance: 91,648 vs VfL Wolfsburg (22 April 2022)
- Lowest home attendance: 842 vs Sporting de Huelva (12 January 2022)
- Average home league attendance: 7,959 (including Joan Gamper)
- Biggest win: Sevilla 1–10 Barcelona
- Biggest defeat: Wolfsburg 2–0 Barcelona; Barcelona 1–3 Lyon
| Home colours | Away colours | Third/European colours |

The 2021–22 season was the 34th season for FC Barcelona Femení. In addition to the domestic league, Barcelona played in that season's editions of the Copa de la Reina and UEFA Women's Champions League. Barcelona were coming off a successful 2020–21 campaign by being the first Spanish women's club to win the continental treble after winning the league, UEFA Women's Champions League, and Copa de la Reina. Grant Wahl has called the side one of the best women's club teams in history.

Barcelona finished the season winning the domestic treble with a 100% win rate in 36 matches across all domestic competitions (league, cup, super cup), scoring 183 goals and conceding only 13 goals with a goal difference of +170.

Overall Barcelona won 45 of the 47 matches played across all competitions, scoring 221 goals and conceding 23 with a goal difference of +198. They lost only twice, both of which came in consecutive matches in the UEFA Women's Champions League knockout stages, losing 0–2 against Wolfsburg in the second leg of the semi-finals, but winning 5–3 on aggregate and getting through to the final.

In the final, Barcelona were defeated 1–3 by Lyon, with the team's only goal being scored by the captain Alexia Putellas. The team finished the season with a 96% win rate across all competitions along with a record 45-match winning streak that lasted from the first match of the season until the defeat against Wolfsburg in the UEFA Women's Champions League semi-finals second leg.

== Kits ==
| Home (Domestic) | Home (European) | Away | Third | Goalkeeper 1 | Goalkeeper 2 | Goalkeeper 3 |

== Players ==
=== Current squad ===
As of 10 August 2021

Note: Flags indicate national team as defined under FIFA eligibility rules; some limited exceptions apply. Players may hold more than one non-FIFA nationality.

| No. | Pos. | Nation | Player |
|---|---|---|---|
| 1 | GK | ESP | Sandra Paños (3rd captain) |
| 2 | DF | ESP | Irene Paredes |
| 3 | DF | ESP | Jana Fernández |
| 4 | DF | ESP | María Pilar León |
| 5 | DF | ESP | Melanie Serrano |
| 6 | FW | ESP | Clàudia Pina |
| 7 | MF | NOR | Caroline Graham Hansen |
| 8 | DF | ESP | Marta Torrejón (vice-captain) |
| 9 | FW | ESP | Mariona Caldentey |
| 10 | FW | ESP | Jennifer Hermoso |
| 11 | MF | ESP | Alexia Putellas (captain) |
| 12 | MF | ESP | Patricia Guijarro (4th captain) |

| No. | Pos. | Nation | Player |
|---|---|---|---|
| 13 | GK | ESP | Cata Coll |
| 14 | MF | ESP | Aitana Bonmatí |
| 15 | DF | ESP | Leila Ouahabi |
| 16 | FW | SWE | Fridolina Rolfö |
| 17 | DF | ESP | Andrea Pereira |
| 18 | MF | SUI | Ana-Maria Crnogorčević |
| 19 | FW | ESP | Bruna Vilamala |
| 20 | FW | NGA | Asisat Oshoala |
| 22 | MF | NED | Lieke Martens |
| 23 | MF | NOR | Ingrid Engen |
| 24 | GK | ESP | Gemma Font |

=== FC Barcelona Femení B ===
Note: Flags indicate national team as defined under FIFA eligibility rules; some limited exceptions apply. Players may hold more than one non-FIFA nationality.

| No. | Pos. | Nation | Player |
|---|---|---|---|
| 27 | MF | ESP | Ariadna Mingueza |
| 28 | DF | ESP | María Molina |
| 29 | MF | ESP | María Pérez |
| 31 | MF | ESP | Júlia Bartel |

| No. | Pos. | Nation | Player |
|---|---|---|---|
| 32 | FW | ESP | Ornella Vignola |
| 33 | FW | ESP | Ona Baradad |
| 38 | DF | ESP | Martina Fernández |
| 39 | DF | ESP | Esther Laborde |

== Transfers ==
=== In ===
| No. | Pos. | Nat. | Player | Moving from | Type | Source |
|---|---|---|---|---|---|---|
Summer
| – | FW | (Spain) | Carla Armengol | Sevilla | Loan return | |
| – | FW | (Spain) | Clàudia Pina | Sevilla | Loan return | |
| – | MF | (Norway) | Ingrid Engen | (Germany) VfL Wolfsburg | Free Transfer | |
| – | FW | (Sweden) | Fridolina Rolfö | (Germany) VfL Wolfsburg | Free Transfer | |
| – | DF | (Spain) | Irene Paredes | (France) Paris Saint-Germain | Free Transfer | |
Winter

=== Out ===
| No. | Pos. | Nat. | Player | Moving To | Type | Source |
|---|---|---|---|---|---|---|
Summer
| 6 | MF | (Spain) | Vicky Losada | (England) Manchester City | End of Contract | |
| 10 | MF | (France) | Kheira Hamraoui | (France) Paris Saint-Germain | End of Contract | |
| – | FW | (Spain) | Carla Armengol | Alavés | End of Contract | |
| 3 | DF | (Spain) | Laia Codina | (Italy) AC Milan | Loan | |
| – | DF | (Spain) | Emma Ramírez | Real Sociedad | Loan | |
| – | FW | (Brazil) | Giovana Queiroz | Levante | Loan | |
Winter
| 21 | MF | (Spain) | Andrea Falcón | Levante | Loan | |

== Competitions ==
=== Overall record ===
| Competition | First match | Last match | Starting round | Final position | Record | | | | | | | |
| Competition | First match | Last match | Starting round | Final position | Pld | W | D | L | GF | GA | GD | Win % |
|---|---|---|---|---|---|---|---|---|---|---|---|---|
| Primera División | 4 September 2021 | 15 May 2022 | Matchday 1 | Winner | 30 | 30 | 0 | 0 | 159 | 11 | +148 | 100.00 |
| Copa de la Reina | 2 March 2022 | 29 May 2022 | Round of 16 | Winner | 4 | 4 | 0 | 0 | 16 | 2 | +14 | 100.00 |
| Supercopa de España | 19 January 2022 | 23 January 2022 | Semi-finals | Winner | 2 | 2 | 0 | 0 | 8 | 0 | +8 | 100.00 |
| UEFA Women's Champions League | 5 October 2021 | 21 May 2022 | Group stage | Runners-up | 11 | 9 | 0 | 2 | 38 | 10 | +28 | 81.82 |
| Total | | | | | 47 | 45 | 0 | 2 | 221 | 23 | +198 | 95.74 |

Last updated: 29 May 2022
Source: Competitions

=== Pre-season and Friendlies ===
Barcelona opened the pre-season with a Joan Gamper Trophy victory against Italian champions Juventus. They travelled to the United States for the 2021 Women's International Champions Cup to face French Division 1 Féminine Lyon and NWSL side Houston Dash at Providence Park in Portland. Barcelona finished third in the summer friendly tournament.

Win Draw Loss Fixtures

| 4 August 2021 Friendly | Barcelona (Spain) | 17–0 | (Spain) Elche | San Pedro del Pinatar, Spain |
| 19:30 CEST (UTC+2) | Pina 9', 19', 22'; Alexia 11', 40'; Bartel 15'; Crnogorčević 28'; Bruna 53', 74', 84'; Hansen 65'; Aitana 70'; Mingueza 71'; Mariona 78', 90'; Melanie 82'; Molina 88' | Report | | Stadium: Pinatar Arena; Attendance: 0 Referee: Kevin Javier Moreno Muñoz (Spain) |

| 8 August 2021 Joan Gamper Trophy | Barcelona (Spain) | 6–0 | (Italy) Juventus | Sant Joan Despí, Spain |
| 18:00 CEST (UTC+2) | Aitana 2'; Hermoso 3', 16'; Paredes 12'; Hansen 27'; Bruna 48' | Report | | Stadium: Estadi Johan Cruyff; Attendance: 1,783; Referee: Ylenia Sánchez Miguel (Spain) |

| 13 August 2021 Friendly | Barcelona (Spain) | 3–0 | (France) Montpellier | Sant Joan Despí, Spain |
| 18:30 CEST (UTC+2) | Aitana 4'; Pina 30'; Pérez 80' | Report | | Stadium: Estadi Johan Cruyff; Attendance: 1,087; Referee: Ainara Acevedo Dudley (Spain) |

| 18 August 2021 WICC Semi-finals | Barcelona (Spain) | 2–3 | (France) Lyon | Portland, United States |
| 17:36 PDT (UTC−7) | Mariona 9', 63'; Paredes (yellow card) 86' | Report | Majri 20'; Henry 27'; Malard 85' | Stadium: Providence Park; Referee: Katja Koroleva (United States) |

| 21 August 2021 WICC Third place play-off | Barcelona (Spain) | 3–2 | (United States) Houston Dash | Portland, United States |
| 16:36 PDT (UTC−7) | Crnogorčević 34'; Alexia 72' (pen.), 78' | Report | Jana 48' (o.g.); Groom 62'; Oyster (yellow card) 71' | Stadium: Providence Park; Referee: Samantha Martinez (United States) |

| 28 August 2021 Friendly | Rosenborg (Norway) | 0–3 | (Spain) Barcelona | Trondheim, Norway |
| 16:00 CEST (UTC+2) | | Report | Aitana 39'; Hansen 84'; Pina 90+2' | Stadium: Lerkendal Stadion; Attendance: 4,285; Referee: Henrikke Nervik (Norway) |

=== Primera División ===
==== League table ====
| Pos | Team | Pld | W | D | L | GF | GA | GD | Pts | Qualification or relegation |
|---|---|---|---|---|---|---|---|---|---|---|
| 1 | Barcelona (C) | 30 | 30 | 0 | 0 | 159 | 11 | +148 | 90 | Qualification for the Champions League group stage |
| 2 | Real Sociedad | 30 | 21 | 3 | 6 | 67 | 38 | +29 | 66 | Qualification for the Champions League second round |
| 3 | Real Madrid | 30 | 19 | 3 | 8 | 41 | 31 | +10 | 60 | Qualification for the Champions League first round |
| 4 | Atlético de Madrid | 30 | 17 | 8 | 5 | 71 | 28 | +43 | 59 | |
| 5 | Granadilla | 30 | 16 | 6 | 8 | 42 | 44 | −2 | 54 | |

Source: RFEF Primera Iberdrola
Rules for classification: 1) Points; 2) Head-to-head points; 3) Goal difference; 4) Number of goals scored
(C) Champions

==== Results summary ====
| Overall | | | | | | | | Home | | | | | | Away | | | | | |
| Pld | W | D | L | GF | GA | GD | Pts | W | D | L | GF | GA | GD | W | D | L | GF | GA | GD |
|---|---|---|---|---|---|---|---|---|---|---|---|---|---|---|---|---|---|---|---|
| 30 | 30 | 0 | 0 | 159 | 11 | +148 | 90 | 15 | 0 | 0 | 83 | 5 | +78 | 15 | 0 | 0 | 76 | 6 | +70 |

Last updated: 15 May 2022.
Source: La Liga

==== Results by round ====
| Round | 1 | 2 | 3 | 4 | 5 | 6 | 7 | 8 | 9 | 10 | 11 | 12 | 13 | 14 | 15 | 16 | 17 | 18 | 19 | 20 | 21 | 22 | 23 | 24 | 25 | 26 | 27 | 28 | 29 | 30 |
|---|---|---|---|---|---|---|---|---|---|---|---|---|---|---|---|---|---|---|---|---|---|---|---|---|---|---|---|---|---|---|
| Ground | H | A | H | A | H | A | A | H | A | H | A | H | A | H | H | A | H | A | H | A | H | A | A | H | A | H | A | H | A | H |
| Result | W | W | W | W | W | W | W | W | W | W | W | W | W | W | W | W | W | W | W | W | W | W | W | W | W | W | W | W | W | W |
| Position | 2 | 1 | 1 | 1 | 1 | 1 | 1 | 1 | 1 | 1 | 1 | 1 | 1 | 1 | 1 | 1 | 1 | 1 | 1 | 1 | 1 | 1 | 1 | 1 | 1 | 1 | 1 | 1 | 1 | 1 |

Updated to match(es) played on 15 May 2022. Source: La Liga
A = Away; H = Home; W = Win; D = Draw; L = Loss; P = Postponed

==== Matches ====
| 4 September 2021 1 | Barcelona | 5–0 | Granadilla Tenerife | Sant Joan Despí |
| 12:00 CEST (UTC+2) | Bruna 31', 35'; Alexia 55'; Patri 68'; Pina 81' | Report | | Stadium: Estadi Johan Cruyff; Attendance: 2,011; Referee: Alicia Espinosa Ríos |

| 11 September 2021 2 | Real Betis | 0–5 | Barcelona | Seville |
| 12:30 CEST (UTC+2) | Thalmann (yellow card) 35'; Asantewaa (yellow card) 41'; Mari Paz (yellow card) 62' | Report | Paredes (yellow card) 38'; Alexia 45'; Oshoala 48', 69'; Mariona 52'; Rolfö 64' | Stadium: Ciudad Deportiva Luis del Sol; Attendance: 400; Referee: Olatz Rivera Olmedo |

| 25 September 2021 3 | Barcelona | 8–0 | Valencia | Sant Joan Despí |
| 12:00 CEST (UTC+2) | Oshoala 23', 46'; Alexia 27', 28', 31'; Mariona 32'; Martens 71'; Hansen 84' | Report | Carro (yellow card) 68' | Stadium: Estadi Johan Cruyff; Attendance: 1,851; Referee: María Dolores Martínez Madrona |

| 29 September 2021 4 | Villarreal | 0–8 | Barcelona | Villarreal |
| 18:00 CEST (UTC+2) | | Report | Martens 17', 83'; Alexia 29', 53'; Marta 37'; Aitana 48'; Oshoala 56', 81' | Stadium: Mini Estadi; Referee: Arantza Gallastegui Pérez |

| 2 October 2021 5 | Barcelona | 9–1 | Alavés | Sant Joan Despí |
| 12:00 CEST (UTC+2) | Bruna 28'; Martens 37'; Crnogorčević 42'; Mariona 47'; Hansen 50'; Melanie 52'; María León (yellow card) 67'; Pina 73'; Jana 80'; Oshoala 84' | Report | Clark 17'; Auñón (yellow card) 44' | Stadium: Estadi Johan Cruyff; Attendance: 1,327; Referee: Xiomara Díaz García |

| 9 October 2021 6 | Atlético Madrid | 0–3 | Barcelona | Alcalá de Henares |
| 17:00 CEST (UTC+2) | Ludmila (yellow card) 90+1' | Report | Oshoala 35'; Martens 70'; Aitana 74' | Stadium: Wanda Alcalá de Henares; Referee: Marta Huerta de Aza |

| 17 October 2021 7 | Sporting de Huelva | 0–5 | Barcelona | Huelva |
| 12:00 CEST (UTC+2) | | Report | Ramírez 27' (o.g.); Alexia 55'; Aitana 63', 77'; Paredes 66' | Stadium: Campos Federativos de la Orden; Attendance: 1,000; Referee: Marta Frías Acedo |

| 31 October 2021 8 | Barcelona | 8–1 | Real Sociedad | Sant Joan Despí |
| 12:00 CET (UTC+1) | Rolfö 3'; Oshoala 23', 38'; Martens 62', 87'; Hermoso 65'; Maddi 83' (o.g.); Pina 90+2' | Report | Franssi 9'; Emma (yellow card) 52'; Gaby (yellow card) 77' | Stadium: Estadi Johan Cruyff; Attendance: 3,549; Referee: Zulema González González |

| 6 November 2021 9 | Eibar | 0–3 | Barcelona | Eibar |
| 12:00 CET (UTC+1) | Elba (yellow card) 88' | Report | Crnogorčević 20'; Oshoala 24'; Hermoso 39' | Stadium: Unbe; Referee: Beatriz Cuesta Arribas |

| 13 November 2021 10 | Barcelona | 4–0 | Levante | Sant Joan Despí |
| 12:00 CET (UTC+1) | Aitana 13'; Alexia 43'; Martens 66'; Hermoso 90+4' (pen.) | Report | Toletti (yellow card) 7'; Calligaris (yellow card) 90+4' | Stadium: Estadi Johan Cruyff; Attendance: 2,441; Referee: Elia Maria Martinez Martinez |

| 20 November 2021 11 | Sevilla | 1–10 | Barcelona | Seville |
| 11:00 CET (UTC+1) | Eli 44' | Report | Hermoso 2', 28', 86', 90+3'; Crnogorčević 6', 17'; Rolfö 37', 58'; Pina 82'; Mariona 83' | Stadium: Estadio Jesús Navas; Attendance: 300; Referee: Arantza Gallastegui Perez |

| 4 December 2021 12 | Barcelona | 4–0 | Athletic Club | Sant Joan Despí |
| 12:00 CET (UTC+1) | Hermoso 50', 75'; Pina 87'; Aitana 90+1' | Report | Eunate (yellow card) 74' | Stadium: Estadi Johan Cruyff; Attendance: 5,147; Referee: Elena Casal Fernandez |

| 12 December 2021 13 | Real Madrid | 1–3 | Barcelona | Madrid |
| 12:00 CET (UTC+1) | Asllani 52' | Report | Martens 8', 23'; Paredes 18'; Marta (yellow card) 83' | Stadium: Estadio Alfredo di Stéfano; Attendance: 2,894; Referee: Marta Huerta de Aza |

| 18 December 2021 14 | Barcelona | 4–0 | Rayo Vallecano | Sant Joan Despí |
| 12:00 CET (UTC+1) | Jana 15'; Melanie 80'; Hermoso 87' (pen.); Aitana 90+3' | Report | Bulatović (yellow card) 14'; Sáez (yellow card) 86' | Stadium: Estadi Johan Cruyff; Attendance: 2,195; Referee: Olatz Rivera Olmedo |

| 22 December 2021 15 | Barcelona | 7–0 | Madrid CFF | Sant Joan Despí |
| 17:00 CET (UTC+1) | Alexia 12', 53' (pen.), 66', (yellow card) 41'; Paola 22' (o.g.); Jana (yellow card) 24'; Hansen 26'; Martens 29'; Leila 83' | Report | Chikwelu (yellow card) 90+2' | Stadium: Estadi Johan Cruyff; Attendance: 2,729; Referee: Maria Eugenia Gil Soriano |

| 8 January 2022 16 | Granadilla Tenerife | 0–7 | Barcelona | San Isidro |
| 16:00 GMT (UTC) | Martín-Prieto (yellow card) 45' | Report | Pisco 25' (o.g.); Hansen 29'; Rolfö 48'; Jana (yellow card) 59'; Martens 63', 69'; Patri 74'; Oshoala 89' | Stadium: Municipal La Palmera; Attendance: 1,220; Referee: Paola Cebollada López |

| 12 January 2022 17 | Barcelona | 5–0 | Sporting de Huelva | Sant Joan Despí |
| 17:00 CET (UTC+1) | Martens 34', 62', 73'; Rolfö 75'; Alexia 79' | Report | | Stadium: Estadi Johan Cruyff; Attendance: 842; Referee: Beatriz Arregui Gamir |

| 29 January 2022 19 | Barcelona | 4–0 | Real Betis | Sant Joan Despí |
| 12:00 CET (UTC+1) | Oshoala 18', 37', 44'; Rolfö 66' | Report | | Stadium: Estadi Johan Cruyff; Attendance: 4,172; Referee: Marta Frías Acedo |

| 2 February 2022 20 | Levante | 1–4 | Barcelona | Buñol |
| 17:00 CET (UTC+1) | Irene (yellow card) 25'; Pinto (yellow card) 67', (goal) 86' | Report | Hermoso (penalty missed) 18', 35'; Oshoala 25'; Patri 33'; Hansen 56' | Stadium: Ciudad Deportiva de Buñol; Attendance: 400; Referee: Arantza Gallastegui Perez |

| 6 February 2022 21 | Barcelona | 7–0 | Eibar | Sant Joan Despí |
| 12:00 CET (UTC+1) | Marta 7', 15'; Pina 11'; María León 22', (yellow card) 43'; Leila 27'; Melanie 52'; Aitana 87' | Report | | Stadium: Estadi Johan Cruyff; Attendance: 3,664; Referee: Amy Peñalver Pearce |

| 9 February 2022 18 | Real Sociedad | 1–9 | Barcelona | San Sebastián |
| 17:00 CET (UTC+1) | Emma 89' | Report | Oshoala 10', 45'; Rolfö 56'; Paredes 59'; Martens 63'; Alexia 79'; Pina 83'; Hermoso 87'; Marta 90+2' | Stadium: Zubieta; Attendance: 1,200; Referee: Elena Peláez Arnillas |
Note: The match was originally scheduled for 16 January 2022, but was postponed due to COVID-19.

| 13 February 2022 22 | Athletic Club | 0–3 | Barcelona | Lezama |
| 12:00 CET (UTC+1) | | Report | Marta 41'; Oshoala 50'; Mariona 62', (yellow card) 66' | Stadium: Lezama; Attendance: 2,500; Referee: María Dolores Martínez Madrona |

| 6 March 2022 23 | Alavés | 0–6 | Barcelona | Vitoria-Gasteiz |
| 12:00 CET (UTC+1) | Gaste (yellow card) 68' | Report | Pina 13', 66', 73'; Rolfö 29'; Engen 33'; Baradad 35'; María León (yellow card) 63' | Stadium: Ciudad Deportiva José Luis Compañón; Attendance: 800; Referee: Elena Peláez Arnillas |

| 13 March 2022 24 | Barcelona | 5–0 | Real Madrid | Sant Joan Despí |
| 12:00 CET (UTC+1) | Alexia 41', 43'; Patri 60'; Peter 65' (o.g.); Hermoso 82' | Report | | Stadium: Estadi Johan Cruyff; Attendance: 5,430; Referee: Arantza Gallastegui Perez |

| 26 March 2022 25 | Madrid CFF | 1–2 | Barcelona | San Sebastián de los Reyes |
| 12:00 CET (UTC+1) | Geyse 3'; Nuria (yellow card) 31' | Report | Hermoso (yellow card) 9', (goal) 38'; Alexia 48'; Melanie (yellow card) 63' | Stadium: Estadio Matapiñonera; Referee: Beatriz Arregui Gamir |

| 2 April 2022 26 | Barcelona | 6–1 | Villarreal | Sant Joan Despí |
| 12:00 CEST (UTC+2) | Pina 47', 48', 63'; Paredes (yellow card) 50'; Crnogorčević 60'; Engen 66'; Hansen 72' (pen.) | Report | Salma 12' | Stadium: Estadi Johan Cruyff; Attendance: 3,999; Referee: Raquel Suárez González |

| 16 April 2022 27 | Valencia | 0–2 | Barcelona | Paterna |
| 12:00 CEST (UTC+2) | | Report | Aitana 18'; Melanie (yellow card) 25'; María León 82' | Stadium: Estadio Antonio Puchades; Attendance: 1,000; Referee: Patricia Luna Varo |

| 5 May 2022 28 | Barcelona | 5–1 | Sevilla | Sant Joan Despí |
| 17:00 CEST (UTC+2) | Mariona (yellow card) 12', (goal) 88'; Oshoala (yellow card) 30', (goal) 60'; Pina 58'; Alexia 74'; Hermoso 90' | Report | Payne 40'; Vasconcelos (yellow card) 42'; Cahynová (yellow card) 70' | Stadium: Estadi Johan Cruyff; Attendance: 3,913; Referee: Elena Peláez Arnillas |

| 8 May 2022 29 | Rayo Vallecano | 1–6 | Barcelona | Madrid |
| 16:00 CEST (UTC+2) | Paula 12' (pen.), (yellow card) 62'; Leles (yellow card) 24'; Iris (yellow card) 32' | Report | Engen (red card) 10'; Paños (yellow card) 11'; Aitana 21', 45', 82'; Marta 57'; Pina 64'; Hermoso 66'; Leila (yellow card) 90+2' | Stadium: Ciudad Deportiva Rayo Vallecano; Referee: Elena Casal Fernandez |

| 15 May 2022 30 | Barcelona | 2–1 | Atlético Madrid | Sant Joan Despí |
| 12:00 CEST (UTC+2) | Paredes 11', (yellow card) 85'; Aitana 23', (red card) 90'; Alexia (penalty missed) 60' | Report | Maitane (yellow card) 16'; van Dongen (yellow card) 28' (yellow-red card) 58'; Amanda 64' | Stadium: Estadi Johan Cruyff; Attendance: 5,179; Referee: Arantza Gallastegui Pérez |

=== Copa de la Reina ===
Barcelona entered at the Round of 16 after the draw on 11 February 2022. The team started their Cup defense in Madrid versus Rayo Vallecano with a 3–1 victory. Their next match was a 3–0 win against Real Sociedad. The team then defeated Real Madrid in the semi-finals, winning for the six^{th} time out of the six games played between them this season.

In the final, Barcelona easily demolished Sporting de Huelva with a 6–1 win, which won them the domestic treble with a 100% win rate in all domestic competitions (league, cup, super cup).

| 2 March 2022 Round of 16 | Rayo Vallecano | 1–3 | Barcelona | Madrid |
| 16:00 CET (UTC+1) | Freitas (yellow card) 72'; Paula 82' (pen.) | Report | Hermoso 3', 53'; Alexia 42'; Leila (yellow card) 58'; Marta (yellow card) 80' | Stadium: Ciudad Deportiva Rayo Vallecano; Referee: Raquel Suárez González |

| 16 March 2022 Quarter-finals | Real Sociedad | 0–3 | Barcelona | San Sebastián |
| 20:45 CET (UTC+1) | Vanegas (yellow card) 56'; Gaby (yellow card) 90+2' | Report | Pina 10'; Patri (yellow card) 44'; Rolfö (yellow card) 45'; Alexia 53', 59' | Stadium: Zubieta; Attendance: 1,200; Referee: Elia María Martínez Martínez |

| 25 May 2022 Semi-finals | Barcelona | 4–0 | Real Madrid | Alcorcón |
| 21:00 CEST (UTC+2) | Martens 19'; Aitana 47'; Caldentey 53'; Oshoala 75' | Report | | Stadium: Estadio Santo Domingo |

| 29 May 2022 Final | Sporting de Huelva | 1–6 | Barcelona | Alcorcón |
| 11:30 CEST (UTC+2) | Castelló 62' | Report | Dolan 25' (o.g.); Mapi León 32'; Crnogorčević 71'; Pina 80'; Martens 86'; Alexia 90+3' | Stadium: Estadio Santo Domingo; Referee: Zulema González González |

=== Supercopa de España Femenina ===
Barcelona faced Real Madrid in the first semi-final, edging out a 1–0 win with a goal by Alexia in the dying minutes of the game. The team then easily dispatched Atlético Madrid with a 7–0 thumping in the final. Barcelona secured their second Supercopa de España Femenina held at La Ciudad del Fútbol in Las Rozas de Madrid.

| 19 January 2022 Semi-finals | Barcelona | 1–0 | Real Madrid | Las Rozas de Madrid |
| 19:15 CET (UTC+1) | Alexia 90+1', (yellow card) 90+2' | Report | Ivana (yellow card) 38' | Stadium: La Ciudad del Fútbol; Attendance: 700; Referee: Olatz Rivera Olmedo |

| 23 January 2022 Final | Barcelona | 7–0 | Atlético Madrid | Las Rozas de Madrid |
| 12:00 CET (UTC+1) | Engen 16'; Hansen 24', 27', 50'; Rolfö 48'; Hermoso (yellow card) 78'; Martens 85', 90' | Report | Maitane (yellow card) 23' | Stadium: La Ciudad del Fútbol; Attendance: 1,123; Referee: Marta Huerta de Aza |

=== UEFA Women's Champions League ===
==== Group stage ====
The group stage draw was completed on 13 September 2021, and Barcelona started its title defense against English club Arsenal. They were also drawn with German outfit TSG 1899 Hoffenheim and Danish champions Køge. Barcelona completed the group stage undefeated with 24 goals scored while only giving up one goal.

| Pos | Team | Pld | W | D | L | GF | GA | GD | Pts | Qualification | BAR | ARS | HOF | KOG |
|---|---|---|---|---|---|---|---|---|---|---|---|---|---|---|
| 1 | (Spain) Barcelona | 6 | 6 | 0 | 0 | 24 | 1 | +23 | 18 | Advance to Quarter-finals | — | 4–1 | 4–0 | 5–0 |
| 2 | (England) Arsenal | 6 | 3 | 0 | 3 | 14 | 13 | +1 | 9 (Note: Head-to-head points: Arsenal 3, 1899 Hoffenheim 3. Head-to-head goal differences: Arsenal +1, 1899 Hoffenheim −1.) | Advance to Quarter-finals | 0–4 | — | 4–0 | 3–0 |
| 3 | (Germany) 1899 Hoffenheim | 6 | 3 | 0 | 3 | 11 | 15 | −4 | 9 | | 0–5 | 4–1 | — | 5–0 |
| 4 | (Denmark) HB Køge | 6 | 0 | 0 | 6 | 2 | 22 | −20 | 0 | | 0–2 | 1–5 | 1–2 | — |

Source: UEFA
Rules for classification: Group stage tiebreakers
Notes:

| 5 October 2021 1 | Barcelona (Spain) | 4–1 | (England) Arsenal | Sant Joan Despí |
| 21:00 CEST (UTC+2) | Mariona 31'; Alexia 42', (penalty missed) 90+5'; Paredes (yellow card) 46'; Oshoala 47'; Martens 84' | Report | McCabe (yellow card) 35'; Mead (yellow card) 51'; Maanum 74'; Foord (yellow card) 76'; Nobbs (yellow card) 90+4'; Parris (yellow card) 90+5' | Stadium: Estadi Johan Cruyff; Attendance: 2,968; Referee: Jana Adámková (Czech Republic) |

| 14 October 2021 2 | Køge (Denmark) | 0–2 | (Spain) Barcelona | Køge |
| 18:45 CEST (UTC+2) | Carusa (yellow card) 90+5' | Report | Melanie (yellow card) 30'; Rolfö 63'; Hermoso 90+5' (pen.) | Stadium: Køge Stadion; Attendance: 1,930; Referee: Esther Staubli (Switzerland) |

| 10 November 2021 3 | Barcelona (Spain) | 4–0 | (Germany) 1899 Hoffenheim | Sant Joan Despí |
| 18:45 CET (UTC+1) | Hermoso 5'; Patri (yellow card) 7'; Alexia 19', 33'; Marta 74' | Report | Naschenweng (yellow card) 37' | Stadium: Estadi Johan Cruyff; Attendance: 2,068; Referee: Sara Persson (Sweden) |

| 17 November 2021 4 | 1899 Hoffenheim (Germany) | 0–5 | (Spain) Barcelona | Hoffenheim |
| 18:45 CET (UTC+1) | | Report | Alexia 41' (pen.); Paredes 53'; Aitana 57'; Marta 89'; Crnogorčević 90+2' | Stadium: Dietmar-Hopp-Stadion; Attendance: 2,200; Referee: Ivana Martinčić (Croatia) |

| 9 December 2021 5 | Arsenal (England) | 0–4 | (Spain) Barcelona | London |
| 19:00 GMT (UTC) | Foord (yellow card) 26'; Wälti (yellow card) 61'; Mead (yellow card) 90+1' | Report | Marta (yellow card) 21'; Aitana 22'; Hermoso 28', 75'; Alexia (yellow card) 30'; Rolfö 45+2' | Stadium: Arsenal Stadium; Attendance: 12,232; Referee: Anastasia Pustovoitova (Russia) |

| 15 December 2021 6 | Barcelona (Spain) | 5–0 | (Denmark) Køge | Sant Joan Despí |
| 21:00 CET (UTC+1) | Leila 10'; Rolfö 29'; Alexia 44'; Engen 65'; Martens 73' | Report | | Stadium: Estadi Johan Cruyff; Attendance: 1,572; Referee: Petra Pavlíková (Slovakia) |

==== Knockout phase ====
Barcelona held the quarter-final, 2nd leg, against Women's Clásico rival Real Madrid at Camp Nou, the home team's second competitive match at the stadium and the first in front of fans. Barcelona advanced to the semi-final with an 8–3 aggregate score, winning both matches in the tie. Barcelona's attendances in their home quarter- and semi-finals (91,553 and 91,648) were the largest known attendances for women's football matches in the world since 1971, Mexico–Denmark (110,000), at the Azteca Stadium. Barcelona beat Wolfsburg 5–1 in the semi-final, 1st leg.

===== Quarter-finals =====
| 22 March 2022 First leg | Real Madrid (Spain) | 1–3 | (Spain) Barcelona | Madrid |
| 21:00 CET (UTC+1) | Olga 8', (yellow card) 36'; Teresa (yellow card) 69'; Esther (yellow card) 85' | Report | Aitana (yellow card) 31'; Leila (yellow card) 36'; Alexia 53' (pen.), 90+4'; Pina 81' | Stadium: Estadio Alfredo di Stéfano; Attendance: 3,318; Referee: Lina Lehtovaara (Finland) |

| 30 March 2022 Second leg | Barcelona (Spain) | 5–2 (8–3 agg.) | (Spain) Real Madrid | Barcelona |
| 18:45 CEST (UTC+2) | María León 8'; Paredes (yellow card) 15'; Aitana 52'; Pina 55'; Alexia 62', (yellow card) 90+1'; Hansen 70' | Report | Lucía (yellow card) 12'; Olga 16' (pen.); Zornoza 48' | Stadium: Camp Nou; Attendance: 91,553; Referee: Stéphanie Frappart (France) |

===== Semi-finals =====
| 22 April 2022 First leg | Barcelona (Spain) | 5–1 | (Germany) VfL Wolfsburg | Barcelona |
| 18:45 CEST (UTC+2) | Aitana 3'; Hansen 10'; Hermoso 33'; Alexia 38', 85' (pen.) | Report | Pajor (yellow card) 64'; Roord 70'; Janssen (yellow card) 84' | Stadium: Camp Nou; Attendance: 91,648; Referee: Sandra Braz Bastos (Portugal) |

| 30 April 2022 Second leg | VfL Wolfsburg (Germany) | 2–0 (3–5 agg.) | (Spain) Barcelona | Wolfsburg |
| 18:00 CEST (UTC+2) | Waßmuth 47'; Lattwein (yellow card) 55'; Roord 59'; Huth (yellow card) 62'; Rauch (yellow card) 90+4' | Report | Hermoso (yellow card) 58' | Stadium: VfL Wolfsburg Arena; Attendance: 22,057; Referee: Cheryl Foster (Wales) |

===== Final =====
| 21 May 2022 Final | Barcelona (Spain) | 1–3 | (France) Lyon | Turin |
| 19:00 CEST (UTC+2) | María León (yellow card) 33'; Putellas 41'; Paredes (yellow card) 85' | Report | Henry 6'; Hegerberg 23', (yellow card) 45+3'; Macario 33', (yellow card) 65'; Morroni (yellow card) 90+4' | Stadium: Juventus Stadium; Attendance: 32,257; Referee: Lina Lehtovaara (Finland) |

== Statistics ==
=== Overall ===
As of 29 May 2022

| No. | Pos. | Nat. | Name | League | | Cup | | Supercup | | Europe | | Total | | Discipline | | Notes |
| No. | Pos. | Nat. | Name | Apps | Goals | Apps | Goals | Apps | Goals | Apps | Goals | Apps | Goals | Yellow card | Red card | Notes |
|---|---|---|---|---|---|---|---|---|---|---|---|---|---|---|---|---|
| 1 | GK | (Spain) | Sandra Paños | 17 | 0 | 4 | 0 | 2 | 0 | 10 | 0 | 33 | 0 | 1 | 0 | |
| 2 | DF | (Spain) | Irene Paredes | 20+4 | 4 | 2 | 0 | 2 | 0 | 9+1 | 1 | 38 | 5 | 6 | 0 | |
| 3 | DF | (Spain) | Jana Fernández | 6+6 | 2 | 0 | 0 | 2 | 0 | 3+1 | 0 | 18 | 2 | 2 | 0 | |
| 4 | DF | (Spain) | María Pilar León | 20+2 | 2 | 4 | 1 | 0+1 | 0 | 8+1 | 1 | 36 | 4 | 4 | 0 | |
| 5 | DF | (Spain) | Melanie Serrano | 9+14 | 3 | 0+1 | 0 | 0+2 | 0 | 2+3 | 0 | 31 | 3 | 3 | 0 | |
| 6 | FW | (Spain) | Clàudia Pina | 10+14 | 14 | 2+2 | 2 | 0+1 | 0 | 2+6 | 2 | 37 | 19 | 0 | 0 | |
| 7 | MF | (Norway) | Caroline Graham Hansen | 21+2 | 6 | 1 | 0 | 2 | 3 | 8+1 | 2 | 35 | 11 | 0 | 0 | |
| 8 | DF | (Spain) | Marta Torrejón | 28+1 | 6 | 4 | 0 | 2 | 0 | 8+2 | 2 | 45 | 8 | 3 | 0 | |
| 9 | FW | (Spain) | Mariona Caldentey | 12+3 | 6 | 2 | 1 | 0 | 0 | 4+3 | 1 | 24 | 8 | 2 | 0 | |
| 10 | FW | (Spain) | Jennifer Hermoso | 14+9 | 17 | 1+1 | 2 | 2 | 0 | 9 | 5 | 36 | 24 | 3 | 0 | |
| 11 | MF | (Spain) | Alexia Putellas | 19+7 | 18 | 4 | 4 | 2 | 1 | 10 | 11 | 42 | 34 | 4 | 0 | |
| 12 | MF | (Spain) | Patricia Guijarro | 23+2 | 4 | 2+1 | 0 | 2 | 0 | 8+1 | 0 | 39 | 4 | 2 | 0 | |
| 13 | GK | (Spain) | Cata Coll | 8 | 0 | 0 | 0 | 0 | 0 | 1 | 0 | 9 | 0 | 0 | 0 | |
| 14 | MF | (Spain) | Aitana Bonmatí | 19+6 | 13 | 4 | 1 | 0 | 0 | 9+1 | 4 | 39 | 18 | 1 | 1 | |
| 15 | DF | (Spain) | Leila Ouahabi | 16+9 | 2 | 2+2 | 0 | 1+1 | 0 | 3+6 | 1 | 40 | 3 | 3 | 0 | |
| 16 | FW | (Sweden) | Fridolina Rolfö | 17+9 | 9 | 3 | 0 | 2 | 1 | 9+2 | 3 | 42 | 13 | 1 | 0 | |
| 17 | DF | (Spain) | Andrea Pereira | 11+8 | 0 | 1+3 | 0 | 0+1 | 0 | 3+2 | 0 | 29 | 0 | 0 | 0 | |
| 18 | MF | (Switzerland) | Ana-Maria Crnogorčević | 12+8 | 5 | 0+2 | 1 | 0 | 0 | 6+3 | 1 | 31 | 7 | 0 | 0 | |
| 19 | FW | (Spain) | Bruna Vilamala | 2+3 | 3 | 0 | 0 | 0 | 0 | 1+1 | 0 | 7 | 3 | 0 | 0 | |
| 20 | FW | (Nigeria) | Asisat Oshoala | 12+7 | 20 | 1 | 1 | 0+2 | 0 | 2+4 | 1 | 28 | 22 | 1 | 0 | |
| 22 | MF | (Netherlands) | Lieke Martens | 13+8 | 17 | 3 | 2 | 2 | 2 | 3+3 | 2 | 32 | 23 | 0 | 0 | |
| 23 | MF | (Norway) | Ingrid Engen | 12+11 | 2 | 3+1 | 0 | 1+1 | 1 | 3+6 | 1 | 38 | 4 | 0 | 1 | |
| 24 | GK | (Spain) | Gemma Font | 5+1 | 0 | 0 | 0 | 0 | 0 | 0 | 0 | 6 | 0 | 0 | 0 | |
| 27 | MF | (Spain) | Ariadna Mingueza | 0 | 0 | 0 | 0 | 0 | 0 | 0 | 0 | 0 | 0 | 0 | 0 | |
| 28 | DF | (Spain) | María Molina | 0+1 | 0 | 0+1 | 0 | 0 | 0 | 0 | 0 | 2 | 0 | 0 | 0 | |
| 29 | MF | (Spain) | María Pérez | 1+5 | 0 | 0+2 | 0 | 0 | 0 | 0+1 | 0 | 9 | 0 | 0 | 0 | |
| 31 | MF | (Spain) | Júlia Bartel | 1+1 | 0 | 0 | 0 | 0 | 0 | 0 | 0 | 2 | 0 | 0 | 0 | |
| 32 | FW | (Spain) | Ornella Vignola | 0+1 | 0 | 0 | 0 | 0 | 0 | 0+1 | 0 | 2 | 0 | 0 | 0 | |
| 33 | FW | (Spain) | Ona Baradad | 2+5 | 1 | 1+2 | 0 | 0 | 0 | 0+2 | 0 | 12 | 1 | 0 | 0 | |
| 38 | DF | (Spain) | Martina Fernández | 0+1 | 0 | 0+1 | 0 | 0 | 0 | 0 | 0 | 2 | 0 | 0 | 0 | |
| 39 | DF | (Spain) | Esther Laborde | 1 | 0 | 0 | 0 | 0 | 0 | 0 | 0 | 1 | 0 | 0 | 0 | |
Own goals (5)

=== Assists ===
As of 29 May 2022

| Rank | No. | Pos. | Player | League | Cup | Super Cup | Champions League | Total |
|---|---|---|---|---|---|---|---|---|
| 1 | 11 | MF | (Spain) Alexia Putellas | 17 | 1 | 0 | 2 | 20 |
| 2 | 7 | FW | (Norway) Caroline Hansen | 13 | 0 | 2 | 4 | 19 |
| 2 | 16 | FW | (Sweden) Fridolina Rolfö | 12 | 0 | 1 | 6 | 19 |
| 4 | 22 | FW | (Netherlands) Lieke Martens | 13 | 3 | 0 | 2 | 18 |
| 5 | 6 | FW | (Spain) Clàudia Pina | 12 | 3 | 0 | 2 | 17 |
| 6 | 12 | MF | (Spain) Patricia Guijarro | 9 | 1 | 0 | 3 | 13 |
| 7 | 10 | FW | (Spain) Jennifer Hermoso | 6 | 0 | 0 | 2 | 8 |
| 7 | 4 | DF | (Spain) María Pilar León | 6 | 0 | 0 | 2 | 8 |
| 9 | 8 | DF | (Spain) Marta Torrejón | 5 | 0 | 1 | 1 | 7 |
| 9 | 9 | FW | (Spain) Mariona Caldentey | 6 | 0 | 0 | 1 | 7 |
| 9 | 20 | FW | (Nigeria) Asisat Oshoala | 3 | 1 | 1 | 2 | 7 |
| 12 | 14 | MF | (Spain) Aitana Bonmatí | 6 | 0 | 0 | 0 | 6 |
| 13 | 15 | DF | (Spain) Leila Ouahabi | 2 | 2 | 0 | 0 | 4 |
| 14 | 18 | FW | (Switzerland) Ana-Maria Crnogorčević | 2 | 0 | 0 | 1 | 3 |
| 15 | 5 | DF | (Spain) Melanie Serrano | 2 | 0 | 0 | 0 | 2 |
| 16 | 19 | FW | (Spain) Bruna Vilamala | 1 | 0 | 0 | 0 | 1 |
| 17 | 2 | DF | (Spain) Irene Paredes | 1 | 0 | 0 | 0 | 1 |
| 18 | 31 | MF | (Spain) Júlia Bartel | 1 | 0 | 0 | 0 | 1 |
| 19 | 17 | DF | (Spain) Andrea Pereira | 0 | 1 | 0 | 0 | 1 |
