= Leila Ouahabi =

Spanish footballer (born 1993)

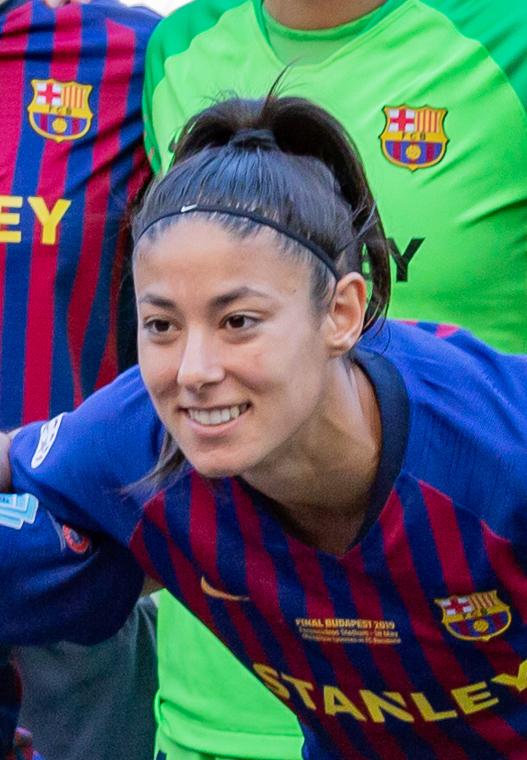
- Ouahabi with Barcelona in 2019

Personal information
- Full name: Leila Ouahabi El Ouahabi
- Date of birth: 22 March 1993 (age 33)
- Place of birth: Mataró, Spain
- Height: 1.72 m (5 ft 8 in)
- Position: Left-back

Team information
- Current team: Gotham FC
- Number: 4

Youth career
- Vilassar de Mar
- 2007–2009: Barcelona

Senior career*
Years	Team	Apps	(Gls)
2009–2011	Barcelona B		
2011–2013	Barcelona	21	(2)
2013–2016	Valencia	85	(3)
2016–2022	Barcelona	86	(1)
2022–2026	Manchester City	106	(1)
2026	Chicago Stars	11	(0)
2026–	Gotham FC	3	(0)

International career^{‡}
2010–2012	Spain U19	11	(1)
2016–	Spain	66	(1)
2014–	Catalonia	4	(0)
Medal record
Women's football
Representing Spain
UEFA Women's Championship
Runner-up	2025 Switzerland
- * Club domestic league appearances and goals as of 1 November 2026 ‡ National team caps and goals as of 11:05, 5 November 2025 (UTC)

Leila Ouahabi El Ouahabi (Note: Spanish: [ˈlejla ɣwaˈxaβi elɣwaˈxaβi]; Arabic: ليلى وهابي الوهابي, pronounced [ˈlæjlæ wæhˈhæːbi‿l.wæhˈhæːbiː].) (born 22 March 1993) is a Spanish professional footballer who plays as a left-back for Gotham FC of the National Women's Soccer League (NWSL) and the Spain national team. She has also played for the Catalonia national team. A full international since 2016, Ouahabi has represented the Spain national team in the 2019 FIFA World Cup and the UEFA Euro 2022.

Born in Catalonia, Ouahabi played youth football with Barcelona before being elevated to become a first team player for the 2011–12 season. She left Barcelona to join Valencia in 2013, before returning to the club in 2016. She had won numerous accolades with Barcelona, which includes the UEFA Champions League, Primera División, and Copa de la Reina. She has also previously been a member of Women's Super League club Manchester City and the Chicago Stars of the NWSL.

== Club career ==
Ouahabi was born in Mataró, Catalonia, to a family of Moroccan origin. Growing up, she would play futsal with her brother and at one point joined a futsal team of eleven other boys. The first club she joined was a girl's youth team of the club UE Vilassar de Mar.

Ouahabi was thirteen when she joined Barcelona's youth teams in 2007. After five years of elevating through the ranks of La Masia, she became a first-team player for the 2011–12 season. This season saw Barcelona achieve their first ever league title win. Ouahabi was frustrated with a lack of playing time after playing a second year in the Spanish Primera División with Barcelona.

Ouahabi joined Valencia in 2013, where she remained until 2016.

In the summer of 2016, Ouahabi re-signed with Barcelona from Valencia. She went on to win three Primera División titles, five Copa de la Reina titles, two Supercopa de España titles and the UEFA Champions League in her second spell at Barcelona, including the continental treble of Primera División, Copa de la Reina and Champions League in 2021.

Ouahabi joined Manchester City from Barcelona in 2022 on a two-year deal. She made her club debut in a UEFA Women's Champions League tie against FC Tomiris Turan on 19 August 2022, and her goal debut in the first minute of a 5-0 victory against West Ham United, on 21 April 2024. In February 2024, she signed a two-year contract extension with Manchester City, keeping her at the club until the summer of 2026. Ouahabi helped Manchester City to win their first WSL title in 10 years, as well as the 2025-26 Women's FA Cup, completing a domestic double trophy lift in 2026 before Manchester City announced her departure on 29 May 2026.

In June 2026, National Women's Soccer League team Chicago Stars announced that they had acquired Ouahabi upon the expiration of her contract with Manchester City. She signed for the American side on a 3-year deal, with her contract running through until the end of 2028. Ouahabi made her NWSL debut on 18 July 2026, making a substitute cameo in a 2–0 loss to Angel City FC. She made 11 appearances (9 starts) for Chicago before mutually terminating her contract with the Stars three months later.

The same day that her contract was terminated with the Stars, Ouahabi joined Gotham FC on a contract through 2028. Her signing was announced at halftime of the Gotham FC Hello Kitty Day game against Angel City FC.

== International career ==
Ouahabi has played for Spain's U19 national team. She earned her first senior national team callup in February 2016 under newly appointed Spain coach Jorge Vilda. A month later, Ouahabi made her senior international debut for Spain on 4 March 2016, starting a 0–0 friendly draw with Romania in Mogoșoaia.

In February 2017, Ouahabi was called up to the Spain squad for the 2017 Algarve Cup, her first call-up for a senior national team tournament. Her first international goal turned out to be the winning goal in the 2017 Algarve Cup final against Canada.

On 20 May 2019, Ouahabi was called up to the Spain squad for the 2019 FIFA World Cup. At the 2019 World Cup Ouahabi started one group stage match, a 0–0 draw against China. The draw was enough to get them past the group stages for the first time in Spain's history where they would then face the United States in the Round of 16. Ouahabi started that Round of 16 match, where Spain had a convincing performance but lost 1–2 against the eventual tournament winners. She ended the tournament having played 180 minutes.

Ouahabi was part of the Spain squad called up for the UEFA Euro 2022. She was later one of Las 15, a group of players who made themselves unavailable for international selection in September 2022 due to their dissatisfaction with head coach Jorge Vilda, and among the dozen who were not involved 11 months later as Spain won the World Cup.

On 10 June 2025, Ouahabi was called up to the Spain squad for the UEFA Euro 2025.

== Career statistics ==
=== Club ===
As of match played 31 May 2026

Appearances and goals by club, season and competition
Club	Season	League			National cup (Note: Includes Copa de la Reina de Fútbol, Women's FA Cup)		League cup (Note: Includes FA Women's League Cup)		Continental		Other		Total	
Club	Season	Division	Apps	Goals	Apps	Goals	Apps	Goals	Apps	Goals	Apps	Goals	Apps	Goals
Barcelona	2010–11	Primera División	2	0	1	0	—		—		—		3	0
Barcelona	2011–12	Primera División	13	1	0	0	—		—		—		13	1
Barcelona	2012–13	Primera División	6	1	0	0	—		—		—		6	1
Barcelona	Total		21	2	1	0	—		—		—		22	2
València	2013–14	Primera División	29	0	2	0	—		—		—		31	0
València	2014–15	Primera División	26	2	3	0	—		—		—		29	2
València	2015–16	Primera División	30	1	2	0	—		—		—		32	1
València	Total		85	3	7	0	—		—		—		92	3
Barcelona	2016–17	Primera División	21	0	3	0	—		7 (Note: Appearance(s) in UEFA Women's Champions League)	1	—		31	1
Barcelona	2017–18	Primera División	6	0	0	0	—		3	0	—		9	0
Barcelona	2018–19	Primera División	21	0	3	0	—		6	0	—		30	0
Barcelona	2019–20	Primera División	14	0	3	0	—		5	0	2 (Note: Appearance(s) in Supercopa de España Femenina)	0	24	0
Barcelona	2020–21	Primera División	22	1	3	0	—		8	0	1	0	34	1
Barcelona	2021–22	Primera División	25	1	4	0	—		9	1	2	0	40	2
Barcelona	Total		109	2	16	0	—		38	2	5	0	168	4
Manchester City	2022–23	Women's Super League	16	0	2	0	4	0	2	0	—		24	0
Manchester City	2023–24	Women's Super League	17	1	3	0	3	0	—		—		23	1
Manchester City	2024–25	Women's Super League	20	0	4	1	3	0	8	0	—		35	1
Manchester City	2025–26	Women's Super League	15	0	4	0	4	0	—		—		23	0
Manchester City	Total		68	1	13	1	14	0	10	0	—		105	2
Career total			283	7	37	1	14	0	48	2	5	0	387	11

=== International ===
As of match played 27 July 2025

Appearances and goals by national team and year
National team	Year	Apps	Goals
Spain	2016	8	0
Spain	2017	12	1
Spain	2018	1	0
Spain	2019	12	0
Spain	2020	3	0
Spain	2021	8	0
Spain	2022	9	0
Spain	2024	4	0
Spain	2025	9	0
Total		66	1

Scores and results list Spain's goal tally first, score column indicates score after each Ouahabi goal.

List of international goals scored by Leila Ouahabi
No.	Date	Venue	Opponent	Score	Result	Competition	Ref.
1	8 March 2017	Estádio Algarve, Algarve, Portugal	Canada	1–0	1–0	2017 Algarve Cup	

== Honours ==
Barcelona

- Primera División: 2011–12, 2012–13, 2019–20, 2020–21, 2021–22
- Copa de la Reina: 2011, 2013, 2017, 2018, 2019–20, 2020–21, 2021–22
- Supercopa Femenina: 2019–20, 2021–22
- Copa Catalunya: 2017, 2018, 2019
- UEFA Women's Champions League: 2020–21

Manchester City

- Women's Super League: 2025–26
- Women's FA Cup: 2025–26

Gotham FC

- NWSL Shield: 2026

Spain

- UEFA Women's Championship runner-up: 2025
- Algarve Cup: 2017
