= Beniferri =

Town in Valencia, Spain

Coordinates: 39°29′46″N 0°24′18″W

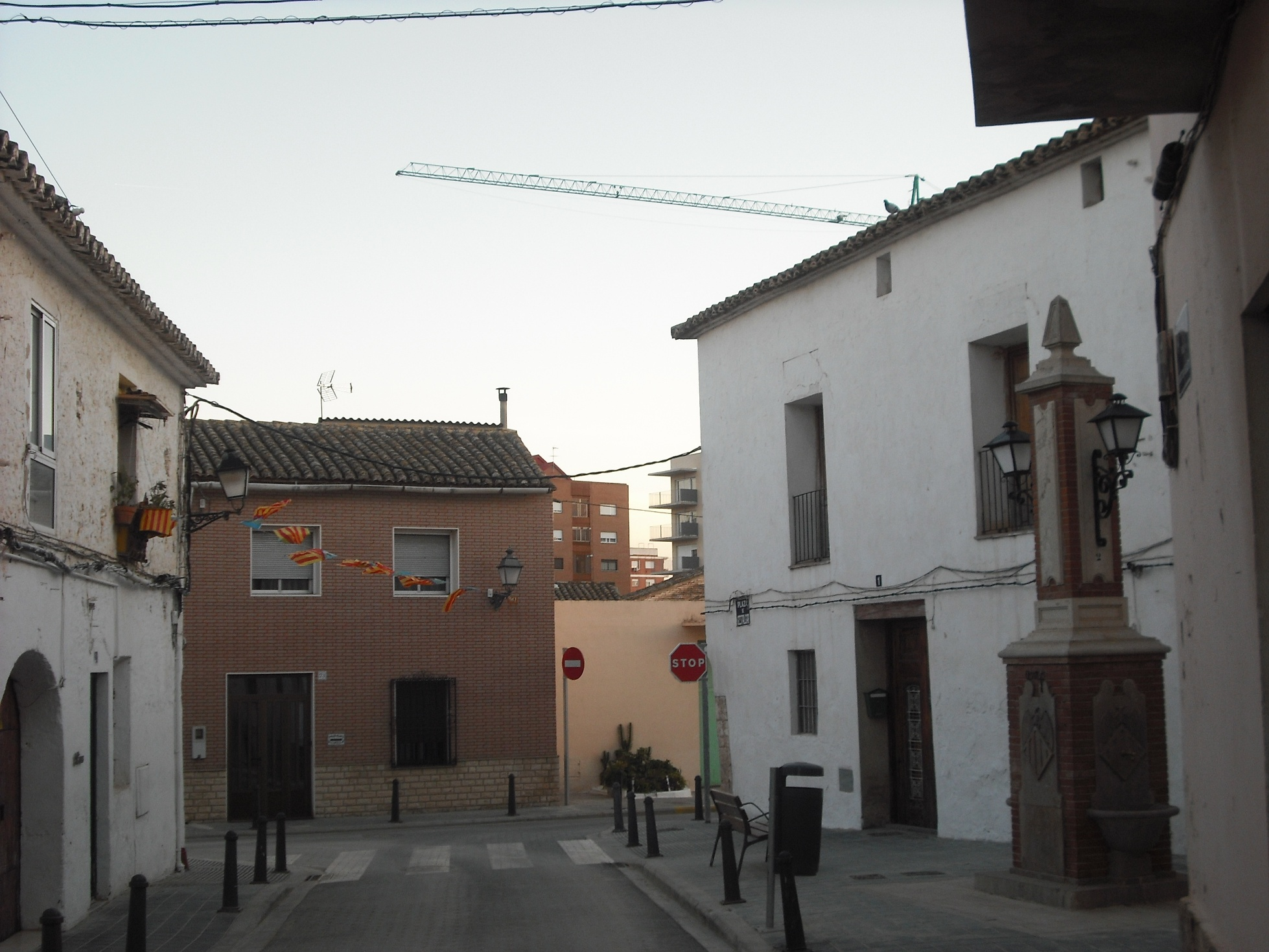
A street in Beniferri

Beniferri is a town located in the Pobles de l'Oest district of the municipality of Valencia.
