= Cristina Auñón =

Spanish footballer (born 1989)

Personal information
- Full name: Cristina Isabel Sánchez Auñón
- Date of birth: 23 March 1989 (age 37)
- Place of birth: Madrid, Spain
- Height: 1.54 m (5 ft 1 in)
- Position: Defender

Team information
- Current team: Alavés
- Number: 22

Senior career*
Years	Team	Apps	(Gls)
2007–2010	Rayo Vallecano B		
2010–2011	Torrejón	17	(1)
2011–2012	Torrelodones		
2012–2013	Torrejón		
2013–2021	Rayo Vallecano	212	(7)
2021–	Alavés	15	(0)
- * Club domestic league appearances and goals as of 15:47, 23 January 2022 (UTC)

Cristina Isabel Sánchez Auñón (born 23 March 1989), often known as Sole, is a Spanish footballer who plays as a defender for Alavés.

== Club career ==
Auñón started her career at Rayo Vallecano B at the age of 18 and stayed there for three years. In her ninth season at Rayo Vallecano, Auñón was made captain. On 17 March 2021, she was handed a five match suspension for aggressive behaviour towards a referee, a charge which she denied. After spending a total of 11 seasons at Rayo Vallecano, Auñón departed for Alavés in August 2021, signing a one-year contract at her new club.

== Personal life ==
Auñón earned the nickname 'Sole' after a coach remarked that she resembled Soledad Giménez from the Spanish band Presuntos Implicados.
