= Nuria Martínez (footballer) =

Spanish footballer (born 2003)

Personal information
- Full name: Nuria Martínez Segarra
- Date of birth: 3 January 2003 (age 23)
- Place of birth: La Vall d'Uixó, Spain
- Position: Defender

Team information
- Current team: Alhama CF
- Number: 3

Senior career*
Years	Team	Apps	(Gls)
2017–2018	Levante D		
2018–2019	Levante C		
2019–2020	Levante B	20	(3)
2020–2023	Levante	9	(0)
2021–2022	→ Madrid CFF (loan)	11	(0)
2022–2023	→ RCD Espanyol (loan)	30	(1)
2023–2024	RCD Espanyol	54	(2)
2024–	Alhama CF	44	(2)
- * Club domestic league appearances and goals as of 6 July 2024

Nuria Martínez Segarra (born 3 January 2003) is a Spanish footballer who plays as a defender for Alhama CF.

== Club career ==
Martínez started her career at Levante D and progressed through the levels at the club.
