= Marieta López =

Spanish footballer

Personal information
- Full name: María López Hidalgo
- Date of birth: 6 April 1988 (age 38)
- Place of birth: Villarreal, Spain
- Position: Winger

Team information
- Current team: Atlético Madrid

Senior career*
Years	Team	Apps	(Gls)
- Villarreal
2004–2008	Sporting Plaza de Argel		
2008–2011	Prainsa Zaragoza	71	(34)
2011–2013	Atlético Madrid	47	(9)
- * Club domestic league appearances and goals as of 20:13, 19 August 2021 (UTC)

María "Marieta" López Hidalgo (born 6 April 1988) is a Spanish former footballer who last played for Atlético Madrid in the Primera División. Her position was midfielder.

== Career ==
Marieta was frequently injured during her career. On 2 March 2007, after having spent eight months recovering from a previous injury, she tore a cruciate ligament in her right knee during a training session with Sporting Plaza de Argel. It was at this club that she first gained the nickname "Marieta", due to being the youngest of the two players called 'María' in the team. After Sporting Plaza de Argel, she would spend three years playing for Prainsa Zaragoza before transferring to Atlético Madrid in 2011. Marieta continued to suffer injuries to her knee, the final one being in February 2013 against Barcelona. The following June, following doctor's advice, she announced her decision to retire from football. That same month, Atlético Madrid paid tribute to her in an event where she received a standing ovation from over 550 people and a video was shown with highlights of her two years at the club.

== Personal life ==
Following her retirement, Marieta spent more time riding horses, a hobby that she first learned at the age of four. She also worked as a DJ under the stagename "María Lopezh".
