= Vicky Losada =

Spanish footballer (born 1991)

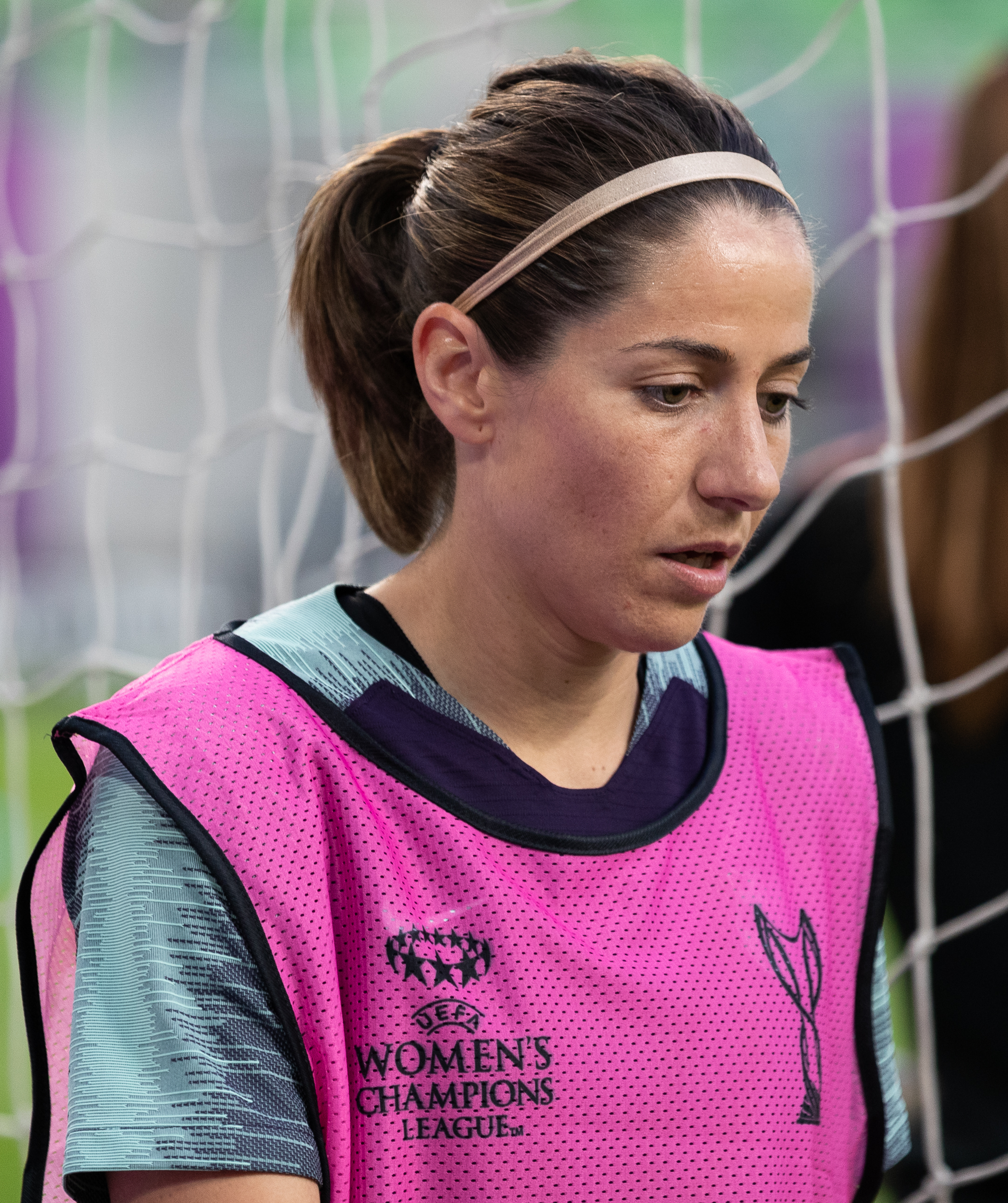
- Losada with Barcelona in the 2019 Champions League Final against Lyon

Personal information
- Full name: María Victoria Losada Gómez
- Date of birth: 5 March 1991 (age 35)
- Place of birth: Terrassa, Catalonia, Spain
- Height: 1.68 m (5 ft 6 in)
- Position: Midfielder

Team information
- Current team: Badalona
- Number: 6

Youth career
- Can Parellada
- Sabadell
- 2004–2006: Barcelona

Senior career*
Years	Team	Apps	(Gls)
2006–2007	Barcelona	19	(0)
2007–2008	Espanyol	24	(3)
2008–2015	Barcelona	165	(47)
2014	→ Western New York Flash (loan)	23	(3)
2015–2016	Arsenal	25	(3)
2016–2021	Barcelona	108	(14)
2021–2023	Manchester City	14	(3)
2023	Roma	6	(0)
2023–2025	Brighton & Hove Albion	36	(2)
2025–	Bristol City	0	(0)
2026–	→ Badalona (loan)	0	(0)

International career
2008–2010	Spain U19	15	(10)
2010–2020	Spain	65	(13)
2014–	Catalonia	4	(1)
- * Club domestic league appearances and goals as of 15:32, 30 May 2025 (UTC)

María Victoria "Vicky" Losada Gómez (Spanish: [maˈɾi.a βiɣˈtoɾja loˈsaða ˈɣomeθ], Catalan: [məˈɾi.ə βikˈtɔɾi.ə luˈzaðə ˈɣɔməθ]; born 5 March 1991) is a Spanish footballer who plays as a midfielder for Levante Badalona, on loan from Bristol City.

At the national level, she plays for the Catalonia national team. Having spent most of her career at childhood club Barcelona, for much of which she was captain, she became known as the team's "eternal captain" after leaving.

== Club career ==
=== 2004–2007: Development at La Masia ===
Losada came through the ranks of Barcelona's youth development program, La Masia. She spent two years with the development squads before making her first team debut in 2006. Barcelona were relegated at the end of her debut season, and as a result she opted for a move to Catalan rivals Espanyol.

=== 2007–08: Season-long stay at Espanyol ===
The season she spent with Espanyol allowed Losada to continue experiencing top-tier football. The team was knocked out of the Copa de la Reina in a 3–4 aggregate loss to Prainsa Zaragoza. Espanyol finished the season in fourth place as Barcelona were promoted back to the Superliga at the end of the 2007–08 season by winning the Segunda División, prompting her return.

=== 2008–2015: Return to Barcelona ===
Following Barcelona's promotion to the first league in 2008, she returned to her childhood club. For the next few seasons following their return from the Segunda, Barcelona recorded regular mid-table finishes in the Primera Division as well as regular quarterfinal and semifinal exits in the Copa de la Reina. 2011 marked new beginnings for the club, as Losada started in the final of the 2011 Copa de la Reina, helping Barcelona win their first major trophy in almost two decades. The following 2011–12 season, Barcelona would go on to win their first ever Primera Division title, solidifying themselves as a force in Spanish football. Losada scored 15 goals in that campaign.

In the years that followed, Barcelona continued to establish dominance in the Spanish league, winning three more consecutive league titles and two more Copas de la Reina. Barcelona's league position at the end of the 2011–12 season made them eligible for the UEFA Women's Champions League in the following season, where Barcelona drew Arsenal in the round of 32. Losada's Champions League debut was a 0–4 loss against Arsenal away. Consistent performances throughout the next few months from both Athletic and Barcelona meant the 2012–13 league title was to be decided in the final week of the competition. Losada started the last match of the season against Athletic which ended 2–1 for Barcelona, where she earned her second league title. Barcelona completed the domestic double by defeating Prainsa Zaragoza 4–1 in the final of the 2013 Copa de la Reina, with Losada starting and scoring the first goal.

Losada assumed captaincy at the start of the 2013–14 season, following the departure of club legend Ana María Escribano. Barcelona recorded their second consecutive domestic double, this time finishing the regular season with a ten-point lead over second place Athletic Bilbao. In Europe, Barcelona were much more successful than the previous season. In the Round of 16 match versus Zürich, Losada recorded her first ever Champions League goal in a match that ended 3–0 to Barcelona. The 2013–14 season concluded with another win in the 2014 Copa de la Reina, where Losada did not feature in the final but was awarded the title due to her participation in the campaign.

==== 2014: Stint with Western New York Flash ====
On 27 February 2014, it was announced that she would spend the remainder of the 2013–2014 European season and the European offseason in the NWSL effective 17 March. She joined the Western New York Flash alongside compatriots Adriana Martín and Sonia Bermúdez. Losada was voted the National Women's Soccer League (NWSL) Player of the Week by the media for Week 1 of the 2014 season for recording two goals and an assist in her debut. She ended the regular season campaign with 23 games played and 6 assists as the Flash finished 7th in the table.

Losada returned to Barcelona for the last few months of 2014.

=== 2015–16: Two seasons at Arsenal ===
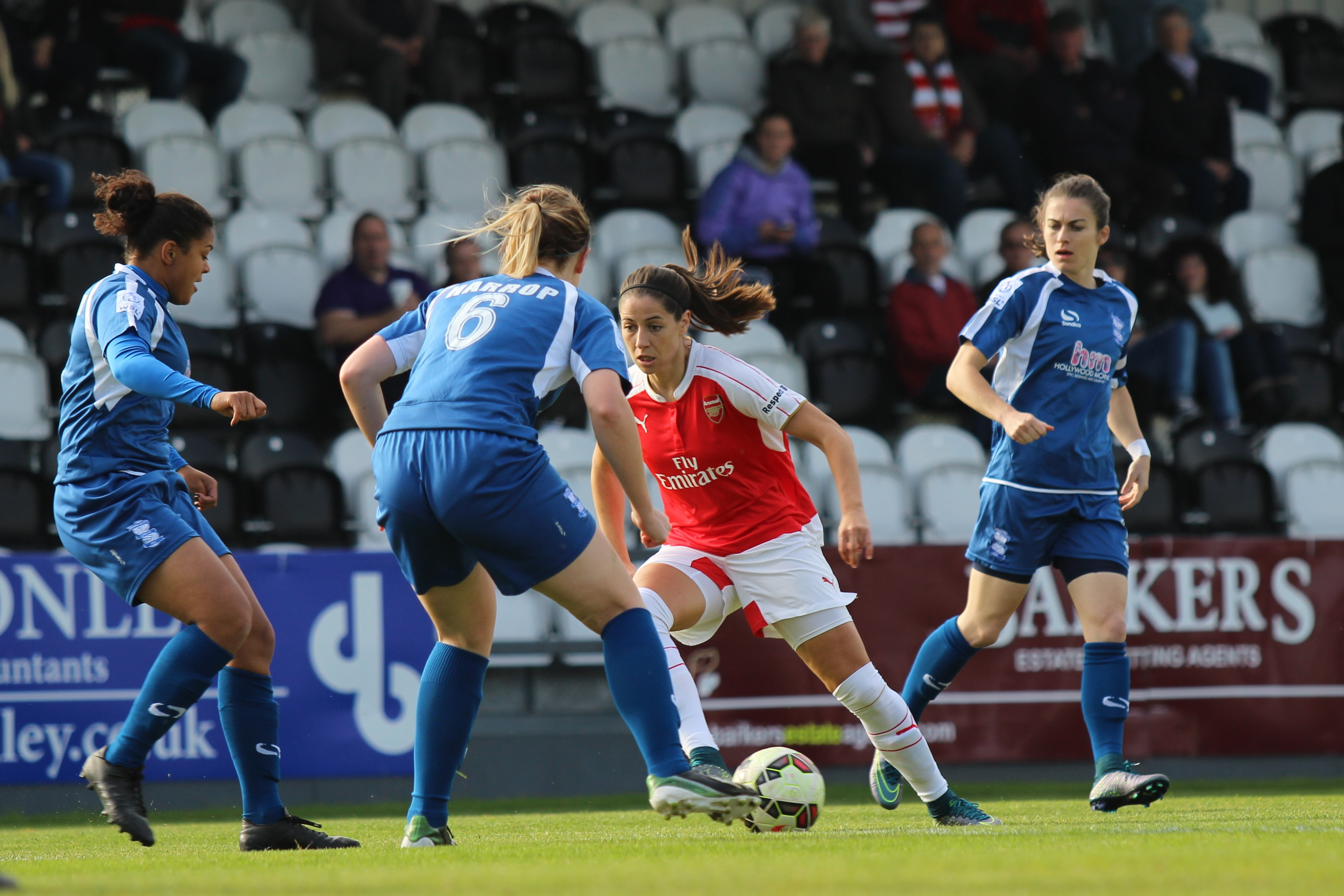
Losada on the ball during a game against Birmingham City W.F.C.

On 21 January 2015, Barcelona announced that Losada was to join Arsenal effective 1 March. In the statement, she cited one of her reasons for leaving was to challenge herself against English physicality, and that she would love to end her career back at Barcelona.

Losada started in each knockout match of Arsenal's 2015 League Cup campaign. She started the final against Notts County and was on the receiving end of a late tackle by Notts County captain Laura Bassett, who was subsequently sent off with a red card. Arsenal won the match 3–0, making it Losada's first title with the club.

In the 2015–16 FA Women's Cup, she played in each match of the knockout stages. She came on at halftime in the match versus Birmingham City, and played through extra time as the club advanced to the quarterfinals on penalties(3–5). In the quarterfinals, she started the match against Notts County, where the club again advanced to the next round on penalties(4–3). She also started in Arsenal's 7–0 semifinal rout of Sunderland, but was subbed out in the 35th minute. She started and played all 90 minutes of the final against Chelsea and won her second title with the club when they won 1–0.

=== 2016–2021: Second return to Barcelona ===
After her year and a half long stint with Arsenal, she returned to Barcelona in November 2016. In the months following her comeback, Barcelona advanced through the group stages and knockout rounds of the UEFA Women's Champions League to reach the club's first ever semi-final of the tournament. She started in both legs of the tie, losing 5–1 on aggregate to PSG. Barcelona also lost out on another league title and finished second, but were redeemed by earning yet another Copa de la Reina title. After scoring the game-winning goal against Valencia to propel Barcelona into the final, Losada started in the final, a 4–1 thrashing of Atlético Madrid.

Losada assumed full captaincy upon her full-season return in 2017–18. Barcelona made it to the quarterfinals of the Champion's League, but were knocked out 3–1 on aggregate by eventual champions Lyon. Barcelona placed second in the league to Atletico Madrid for the second season in a row, but again redeemed themselves with their 2018 Copa de la Reina run. The semifinal against Athletic Bilbao ended 2–2 in extra time and forced a penalty shootout, with Losada successfully converting hers and making way for the team to reach the final. Losada started in the final, a 1–0 extra time win against Atleti.

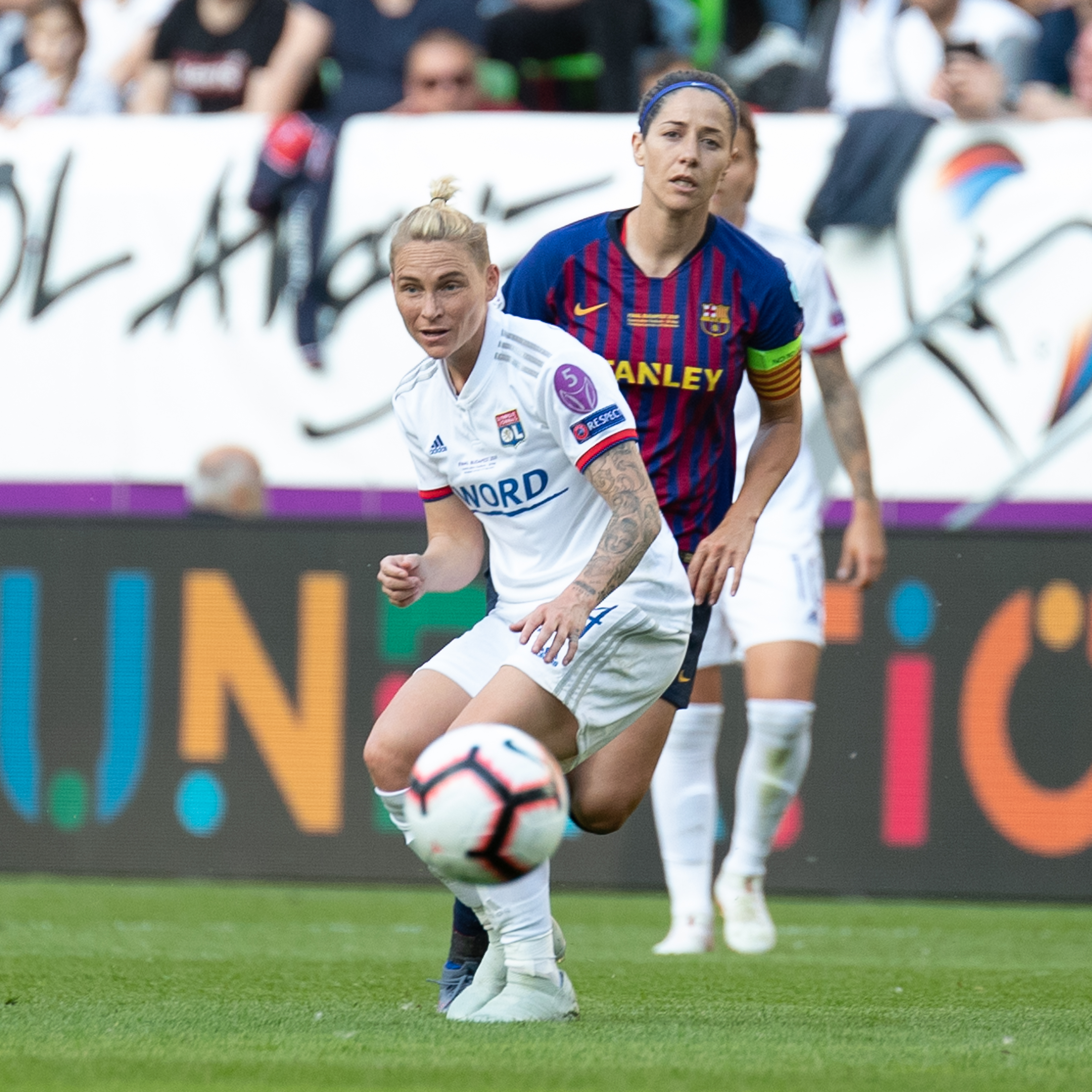
Losada (behind) captaining Barcelona during the 2019 UEFA Women's Champions League Final

Barcelona found new heights in the 2018–2019 season, reaching the semifinals of the Champions League. Losada missed the away leg but started in the home leg, where she captained her side to a 1–0 win over Bayern Munich that saw Barcelona through to their first ever Champion's League Final. The day before the match, Losada said in an interview that the final was going to be "the match of her life."

The pressure is on Lyon. Thats the reality. We are growing, our responsibility is to win. If we did it, it would be historical, it would mark a before and after in Spanish football. It is the match of our lives for all of us.

On 18 May 2019, Losada captained Barcelona's first UWCL final against long-standing European powerhouse Lyon. Barcelona were unable to contain Lyon's overbearing front three of Ada Hegerberg, Eugénie Le Sommer and Shanice van de Sanden, and the match ended up a 4–1 loss to Barcelona.

Losada missed the first few months of the 2019–20 season due to injury, but made her comeback against Deportivo de La Coruña on 24 November 2019, subbing on for Alexia Putellas in the 65th minute. She captained Barcelona to their 10–1 inaugural Supercopa de España humiliation against Real Sociedad on 9 February 2020 and their fifth league title on 8 May, after COVID-19 resulted in the season ending prematurely in January.

In the 2020–21 season, she started more than half of the matches on the bench as she captained her team to the postponed 2020 Copa de la Reina victory over Logroño by 3–0. On 17 April, she became the footballer with the second-most appearances for Barcelona's women team's history with 361 matches, only behind teammate Melanie Serrano, who had 474. She led her team to a historic continental treble of the league title (declared champions on 9 May), a maiden UEFA Women's Champions League (won on 16 May after defeating Chelsea 4–0 in the final) and the Copa de la Reina (won on 31 May after defeating Levante 4–2). On 4 June, she announced that she would be leaving the club at the end of the season in an emotional press conference.

=== Manchester City ===
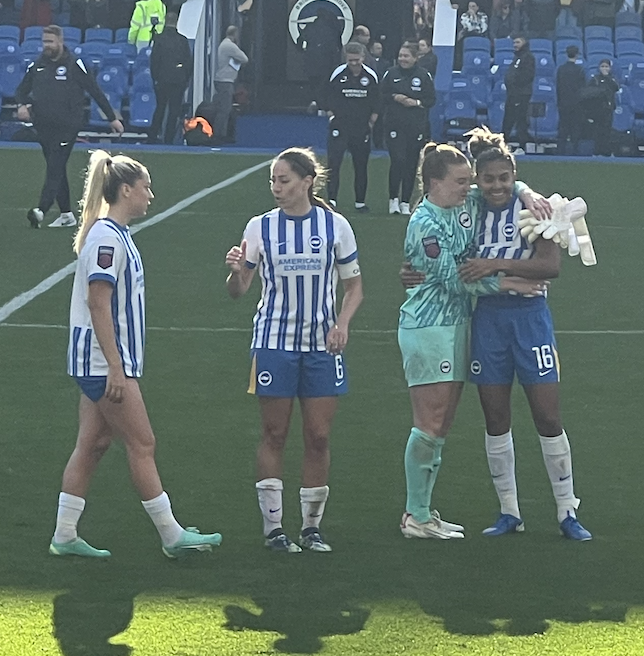
Losada captaining Brighton in October 2024.

On 5 July 2021, Losada signed for Manchester City on a two–year deal. She requested to wear the number 17 jersey to emulate the men's team's Kevin de Bruyne, who wears the same number.

=== Roma ===
In the winter transfer window of 2023, Losada signed for AS Roma after her two-year contract with Manchester City expired.

=== Brighton & Hove Albion ===
On 16 July 2023, Losada signed for Brighton & Hove Albion on a long-term deal. She was named club captain on 23 September 2023. On 9 July 2025, it was announced that Losada had been released from Brighton at the end of her two-season contract. She made 47 appearances in all competitions during her time playing for the Seagulls.

=== Bristol City ===
In August 2025, Losada joined Women's Super League 2 club Bristol City, signing a three-year contract. In September 2025, she was named as the club's captain for the 2025-26 season. Her headed goal in a 2–1 win over Durham won the WSL2 Goal of the Month award for October 2025.

On 12 July 2026, Losada was announced at FC Badalona on a season long loan.

== International career ==
Losada is a member of the Spain women's national football team.

Her first senior national team cap was on 19 June 2010, a 2011 Women's World Cup Qualifying match versus England. Losada started as a substitute and entered the match in the 81st minute for Sonia Bermúdez. In June 2013, national team coach Ignacio Quereda selected Losada in the squad for UEFA Women's Euro 2013 in Sweden. Losada played in each match of the group stages but was on the bench for Spain's tournament exit, a 3–1 loss to Norway in the quarterfinals.

Her first goal for La Roja came in the 44th minute of a 12–0 2015 Women's World Cup Qualifying rout of Macedonia. She scored two more against Estonia in Spain's 2015 World Cup qualifying group, a campaign that ended up with Spain qualifying for their first ever Women's World Cup. Losada was called up to Spain's 2015 FIFA Women's World Cup squad in Canada and at their opening match on 9 June, she scored Spain's first ever World Cup goal against Costa Rica. That match finished 1–1. Losada's goal would end up giving Spain their only point as one of their only two goals of the entire tournament, where they exited the group stages with two losses and a draw. Not soon after, Losada and her 22 teammates in the tournament issued a statement calling for the resignation of long-tenured coach Ignacio Quereda, citing poor preparation for the tournament and lost confidence. Quereda resigned on 30 July 2015.

Under new national team coach Jorge Vilda, Spain won in every match of their 2017 Euro Qualifier group, where Losada scored four goals in three games versus Ireland, Portugal and Montenegro. At the 2017 Euro, Spain put in an uninspiring group stage performance, their only win coming against Portugal, in which Losada scored a goal as the match finished 2–0.La Roja made it to the quarterfinals of the tournament on their head-to-head record and faced Austria in the quarterfinals. Losada started the match but was subbed out in the 68th minute for Alexia Putellas. The match would end up going to penalties where Spain would exit the tournament.

In the next two years, Spain would end up winning the 2018 Cyprus Cup with Losada in the squad and the 2019 Algarve Cup, in which she started in the final.

On 20 May 2019, Losada was called up to the Spain squad for the 2019 FIFA Women's World Cup. Spain performed much better at the 2019 FIFA Women's World Cup, making it to the Round of 16 for the first time in the country's history. Losada started that match versus the United States but was taken off in the 32nd minute after a collision with Sam Mewis that gave her a black eye. Spain put up an impressive display against the eventual tournament winners but ended up losing 2–1. Losada played 77 minutes throughout the entire tournament.

== Career statistics ==
=== Brighton & Hove Albion ===
As of 2 March 2025

Season	League			FA Cup		League Cup		Total	
Season	Division	Apps	Goals	Apps	Goals	Apps	Goals	Apps	Goals
2023–24	Women's Super League	21	1	3	1	4	1	28	3
2024–25	Women's Super League	15	1	1	0	2	0	18	1
Total		36	2	4	1	6	1	46	4

=== International ===
Scores and results list Spain's goal tally first, score column indicates score after each Losada goal.

List of international goals scored by Vicky Losada
No.	Date	Venue	Opponent	Score	Result	Competition
1	13 February 2014	Estadio Las Gaunas, Logroño, Spain	Macedonia	4–0	12–0	2015 FIFA Women's World Cup qualification
2	8 May 2014	A. Le Coq Arena, Tallinn, Estonia	Estonia	2–0	4–0	2015 FIFA Women's World Cup qualification
3	8 May 2014	A. Le Coq Arena, Tallinn, Estonia	Estonia	3–0	4–0	2015 FIFA Women's World Cup qualification
4	9 June 2015	Olympic Stadium, Montreal, Canada	Costa Rica	1–0	1–1	2015 FIFA Women's World Cup
5	26 November 2015	Tallaght Stadium, Dublin, Republic of Ireland	Republic of Ireland	1–0	3–0	UEFA Women's Euro 2017 qualifying
6	1 December 2015	Estadio Nuevo Vivero, Badajoz, Spain	Portugal	1–0	2–0	UEFA Women's Euro 2017 qualifying
7	24 January 2016	Stadion pod Malim Brdom, Petrovac na moru, Montenegro	Montenegro	1–0	7–0	UEFA Women's Euro 2017 qualifying
8	24 January 2016	Stadion pod Malim Brdom, Petrovac na moru, Montenegro	Montenegro	4–0	7–0	UEFA Women's Euro 2017 qualifying
9	15 September 2016	La Ciudad del Fútbol, Las Rozas de Madrid, Spain	Montenegro	11–0	13–0	UEFA Women's Euro 2017 qualifying
10	8 April 2017	Kehrwegstadion, Eupen, Belgium	Belgium	1–0	4–1	Friendly
11	10 June 2017	Estadio Fernando Torres, Fuenlabrada	Brazil	1–0	1–2	Friendly
12	30 June 2017	Pinatar Arena, San Pedro del Pinatar, Spain	Belgium	2–0	7–0	Friendly
13	19 July 2017	De Vijverberg, Doetinchem, Netherlands	Portugal	1–0	2–0	UEFA Women's Euro 2017

== Honours ==
Barcelona

- Primera División: 2011–12, 2012–13, 2013–14, 2014–15, 2019–20, 2020–21
- UEFA Women's Champions League: 2020–21
- Copa de la Reina: 2011, 2013, 2014, 2017, 2018, 2020, 2021
- Supercopa Femenina: 2020
- Copa Catalunya: 2009, 2010, 2011, 2012, 2016, 2017, 2018, 2019

Arsenal

- FA Women's Cup: 2015–16
- FA WSL Cup: 2015

Manchester City

- FA WSL Cup: 2021–22

Roma

- Serie A: 2022–23

Spain

- Algarve Cup: 2017

Individual

- PFA's WSL Team of the Year: 2015–2016
- Arsenal Supporters' Player of the Season award: 2016
- UEFA Women's Champions League Squad of the Season: 2018–19

== Personal life ==
Losada is married to the retired Irish soccer player Emma Byrne.
