= 2020–21 Copa de la Reina de Fútbol =

Tournament details
- Country: Spain
- Teams: 8

Final positions
- Champions: Barcelona (8th title)
- Runners-up: Levante

Tournament statistics
- Matches played: 7
- Goals scored: 16 (2.29 per match)
- Top goal scorer: Alexia Putellas (5)

Awards
- Best player: Alexia Putellas

The 2020–21 Copa de la Reina de Fútbol was the 39th edition of the Spanish women's association football national cup, and was played between 21 April and 30 May 2021.

== Format changes ==
Since the 2018–19 edition of the tournament, all 16 teams in the Primera División partook in the competition, with all rounds being played in a single match. This season, however, due to the COVID-19 pandemic, the competition returned to an 8-team tournament without a Round of 16, which was the structure prior to the 2018–19 season.

== Schedule and format ==
All ties are played in a one match decider at a home ground. The first draw for the tournament took place on 5 April 2021.

- In the first stage, teams that play in the UEFA Women's Champions League cannot play each other.
- Each quarterfinal and semifinal matchup are determined by draw.

The Royal Spanish Football Federation (RFEF) announced that both the semifinals and the final would be played in the Estadio Municipal de Butarque, in Leganés, Spain.

Round	Draw date	Date	Fixtures	Clubs	Format details
Quarter-finals	5 April 2021	21 April 2021; 5 May 2021	4	8 → 4	Opponents seeding: Luck of the draw. Home team seeding: The team that is drawn first. Knock-out tournament type: Single match.
Semi-finals	12 May 2021	26–27 May 2021	2	4 → 2	Opponents seeding: Luck of the draw. Home team seeding: Luck of the draw. Knock-out tournament type: Single match.
Final	12 May 2021	30 May 2021	1	2 → 1	Single match at the Estadio Municipal de Butarque, Leganés.

Notes

- Single-match rounds ending in a tie will be decided in extra time; and if it persists, by a penalty shootout.

== Matches ==
=== Bracket ===
Quarter-finals
5 May
Sevilla	1
Barcelona	4
21 April
Madrid CFF	2
Real Madrid	1
21 April
Real Sociedad	0
Atlético de Madrid	1
5 May
Levante	2
Granadilla	1

Semi-finals
26 May
Barcelona	4
Madrid CFF	0
27 May
Atlético de Madrid	0
Levante	1

Final
30 May
Barcelona	4
Levante	2

=== Quarterfinals ===
21 April 2021	Real Sociedad	0–1	Atlético de Madrid	San Sebastián
10:30		Report	Ajibade 90+2'	Referee: María Eugenia Gil

21 April 2021	Madrid CFF	2–1 (a.e.t.)	Real Madrid	Madrid
13:00	Geyse 3'; Borja 110'	Report	Asllani 77' (pen.)	Stadium: Venue Centro Deportivo Municipal Antiguo Canódromo; Referee: Beatriz Cuesta

5 May 2021	Levante UD	2–1	UD Granadilla Tenerife	Buñol
07:00	Méndez 11' (90+2)	Report	Gavira 60'	Stadium: Venue Ciudad Deportiva de Buñol – Campo 1 Referee: Rivera Olmedo

5 May 2021	Sevilla	1–4	Barcelona	Sevilla
13:00	Pina 13'	Report	Caldentey 26'; Losada 47'; Putellas 48'; Hansen 90+4'	Stadium: Ciudad Deportiva José Ramón Cisneros Palacios; Referee: Beatriz Arregui Gamir

=== Semifinals ===
26 May 2021	Madrid CFF	0–4	Barcelona	Leganés
13:00			Putellas 16', 69'; Vilamala 51'; Caldentey 66'	Stadium: Estadio Municipal de Butarque; Referee: María Eugenia Gil

27 May 2021	Atlético de Madrid	0–1	Levante UD	Leganés
14:00			Gálvez 90'	Stadium: Estadio Municipal de Butarque; Referee: Ainara Acevedo

=== Final ===
30 May 2021
14:00

Barcelona	4–2	Levante UD
Guijarro 5'; Putellas 20', 73'; Torrejón 29'		Redondo 59'; Banini 67'

Estadio Municipal de Butarque, Leganés
Referee: María Martínez

== Top goalscorers ==
As of 3 July 2021

Rank	Player	Club	Goals
1	(Spain) Alexia Putellas	Barcelona	5
3	(Spain) Mariona Caldentey	Barcelona	2
3	(Spain) María Méndez	Levante	2
