= Marta Cubí =

Spanish footballer (born 1985)

Personal information
- Full name: Marta Cubí Tudó
- Date of birth: 6 May 1985 (age 41)
- Place of birth: Igualada, Spain
- Height: 1.69 m (5 ft 6 1/2 in)
- Position: Striker

Senior career*
Years	Team	Apps	(Gls)
1997–2003	Igualada		(158)
2003–2009	Espanyol	78+	(87)
2009–2010	Barcelona	24	(11)
2010–2013	Sant Gabriel	76	(21)
2013–2014	Cerdanyola del Vallès		
2014–2016	Levante Las Planas		
2016–2018	Igualada		

International career
- Spain U-19
2005	Spain	1	(0)
- * Club domestic league appearances and goals

Marta Cubí Tudó is a retired Spanish football player.

Cubí started playing football in her hometown team, CF Igualada, which was promoted to the women's second division in 2002. The next year she was signed by RCD Espanyol. Her second season at Espanyol was the best of her career as she was the top scorer in the 2004–05 League with 32 goals. The following year Espanyol won the League and Cup. Cubí was Espanyol's top scorer at the 2006-07 UEFA Women's Cup together with Adriana Martín, with 6 goals.

She was dismissed from the team in May 2009 together with Noemí Rubio. Both players subsequently moved to Espanyol's rival, FC Barcelona. One year later she signed for newly promoted CE Sant Gabriel, also from Barcelona. She also works as a trainer for Catalonia's Under-16 team and organizes a summer camp for girls in Camprodon under her name.

Cubí was briefly a member of the Spanish national team in early 2005. In May 2008 she was called up for a Euro qualifier against Northern Ireland's women's national football team, but she did not play.
