= Silvia Doblado =

Spanish footballer

Personal information
- Full name: Silvia Doblado Peña
- Date of birth: 22 March 1987 (age 39)
- Place of birth: Las Palmas de Gran Canaria, Spain
- Height: 1.63 m (5 ft 4 in)
- Positions: Defender; midfielder

Team information
- Current team: Granadilla

Senior career*
Years	Team	Apps	(Gls)
2003–2005	Rayco		
2005–2007	Sevilla		
2007–2008	Apolo Murcia		
2008–2010	Barcelona		
2010–2011	Las Palmas		
2011–2013	Sporting Huelva	63	(2)
2013–2023	Granadilla	125	(2)

International career
2004–2006	Spain under-19		
- * Club domestic league appearances and goals as of 1 July 2023

Silvia Doblado Peña is a former Spanish football midfielder, who played for Rayco, Sevilla, Apolo Murcia, Barcelona, Las Palmas, Sporting Huelva and Granadilla.

== Club career ==
On 15 June 2011, Doblado transferred from Las Palmas to Sporting de Huelva. Prior to this, she had already played league football for Sevilla and Barcelona. In 2013, she signed for Granadilla, and in doing so, was part of their inaugural squad. In 2021, having played more than 150 games for the Canarian club and participated in their promotion to the Primera División in 2015, Doblado renewed her contracted with Granadilla.

== International career ==
As an under-19 international she won the 2004 U-19 European Championship and played the subsequent World Championship. In 2012, she was called up to train with Spain's senior team at La Ciudad del Fútbol.
