= Melanie Serrano =

Spanish footballer (born 1989)

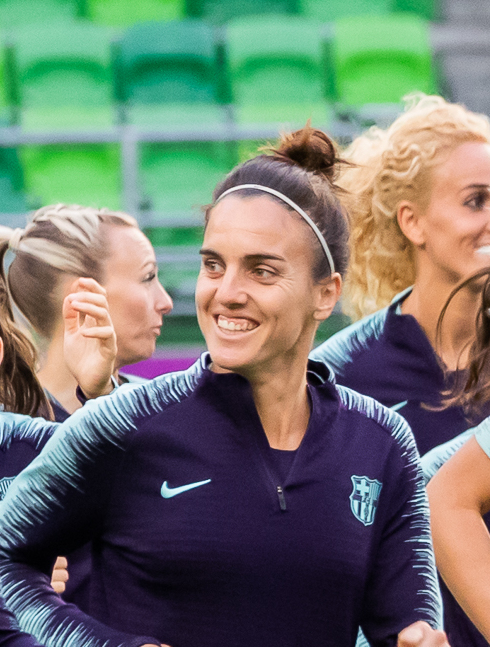
- Serrano in 2019

Personal information
- Full name: Melanie del Pilar Serrano Pérez
- Date of birth: 12 October 1989 (age 37)
- Place of birth: Seville, Spain
- Height: 1.68 m (5 ft 6 in)
- Positions: Left back; left midfielder

Youth career
- 2001–2002: CD Cantely
- 2002–2003: Dos Hermanas
- 2003–2006: Barcelona

Senior career*
Years	Team	Apps	(Gls)
2006–2007	Barcelona B		
2007–2022	Barcelona	403	(8)
2024–2025	Levante Las Planas	30	(2)

International career^{‡}
2009–2016	Spain	15	(0)
- * Club domestic league appearances and goals as of 22:50, 24 April 2024 ‡ National team caps and goals as of 22:50, 24 April 2024 (UTC)

Melanie del Pilar Serrano Pérez (born 12 October 1989) is a Spanish former footballer who played as a left back.

She had a 19-season career with FC Barcelona Femení. Upon retirement, she was the club's leader in appearances and held the record for titles, with 27 trophies won.

== Early life ==
Serrano was born in Seville on 12 October 1989. When Serrano was 12, her mother moved her and her sister to Blanes, Girona. Serrano’s first experience in a football team was with local side Deportivo Blanes. She underwent trials to join the club after her mother could not afford the fees necessary to join. She later played youth football with CD Cantely and Dos Hermanas.

Serrano was fourteen when she was recruited to join Barcelona’s women’s youth teams. As a teenager, Serrano traveled 3 times a week from Blanes to the Mini Estadi in Barcelona, where she would train.

== Club career ==
=== Barcelona Femení ===
Serrano spent her entire professional career with FC Barcelona Femení. Serrano was 14 years old when she made her first-team debut on 15 September 2004, in a 4-4 draw against Espanyol. Serrano became a first-team player in 2007, and Barcelona were relegated to the Segunda División the same year. They returned to the Primera División in 2008.

Serrano was a member of the squad that won Barcelona's first league title in the 2011–12 season. She started Barcelona's UEFA Women's Champions League debut the following 2012–13 season, in a 0-3 home loss to Arsenal.

Serrano scored Barcelona’s opening goal in the final matchweek of the 2012–13 Primera División campaign, helping secure their second league title against Athletic Bilbao.

On 6 January 2021, Serrano scored in the Camp Nou against Espanyol in the first competitive match played between women at the stadium.

On 30 June 2020, Serrano extended her Barcelona contract to the end of the 2020–21 season. In June 2021, Serrano renewed her Barcelona contract for a final year until the end of the 2021–2022 season. In the following season, Serrano achieved multiple final milestones with the club. On 6 February 2022, Serrano played her 500th match for Barcelona and scored in a 7-0 win over Eibar. On 16 April, Serrano reached 400 appearances in the Spanish league. On 13 May 2022, Serrano officially announced her retirement from football after 19 seasons. At the time of her retirement, she was the leader of appearances for FC Barcelona's women's section, and was in the top 10 for total appearances at FC Barcelona, regardless of gender. She also retired with 27 trophies, the most of any FC Barcelona Femení player.

In February of 2024, she returned to professional football and signed with Levante Las Palnas.

== International career ==
Serrano was a member of Spain's under-19 women's national team, and featured in the 2007 UEFA Women's Under-19 Championship.

Her full international debut at the senior level was on 29 October 2009 against Austria at 20 years old. Serrano played one match in qualification for the 2015 FIFA Women's World Cup, subbing in against Romania. Melanie was part of Spain's squad at the 2015 FIFA Women's World Cup in Canada. Serrano did not play any matches during the World Cup as Spain bowed out in the group stage of the competition.

== Personal life ==
As of 2019, Serrano is studying nursing.

In June 2021, Serrano’s career was honored by the mayor of Blanes, Àngel Canosa, with a stone plaque of the Blanes coat of arms.

Serrano is in a relationship with Lara Salmerón. In September 2021, the couple announced that they are expecting twins. The twins, Natura and Itzel, were born on 17 February 2022.

== Honours ==
=== Club ===
Barcelona

- Primera División: 2011–12, 2012–13, 2013–14, 2014–15, 2019–20, 2020–21, 2021–22
- Segunda División: 2007–08
- UEFA Women's Champions League: 2020–21
- Copa de la Reina: 2011, 2013, 2014, 2017, 2018, 2020, 2021
- Supercopa Femenina: 2019–20, 2021–22
- Copa Catalunya: 2009, 2010, 2011, 2012, 2014, 2015, 2016, 2017, 2018, 2019
