= Noemí Rubio =

Spanish footballer

Personal information
- Full name: Noemí Rubio Gil
- Date of birth: 7 December 1983 (age 42)
- Place of birth: Sabadell, Spain
- Position: Midfielder

Senior career*
Years	Team	Apps	(Gls)
1999–2005	Sabadell		
2005–2009	Espanyol		
2009–2011	Barcelona	35	(6)
- * Club domestic league appearances and goals as of 23:31, 8 September 2021 (UTC)

Noemí Rubio Gil (born 7 December 1983) is a Spanish former footballer, who played as a midfielder.

== Career ==
Rubio started her senior career at Sabadell. With this team she won her first national cup in 2003. In the summer of 2005 she moved from Sabadell, which would disappear just months later, to Espanyol. In her first season in the white and blues she won both the League and Cup. Her time at the club ended abruptly in May 2009 as she uploaded to her Facebook account photos which showed her supporting Espanyol's rival FC Barcelona at the 2008-09 Copa del Rey final in Valencia. Rubio was dismissed from the team for the remainder of the season and her contract was not renewed.

She subsequently moved to Barcelona, where she spent her two last seasons. In June 2011 she won her fourth national cup in a final match against her former team. It was her last game as she retired at just 27 years old. She scored her last goal in the semi-finals against Real Sociedad.
