= Ana María Escribano =

Spanish footballer (born 1981)

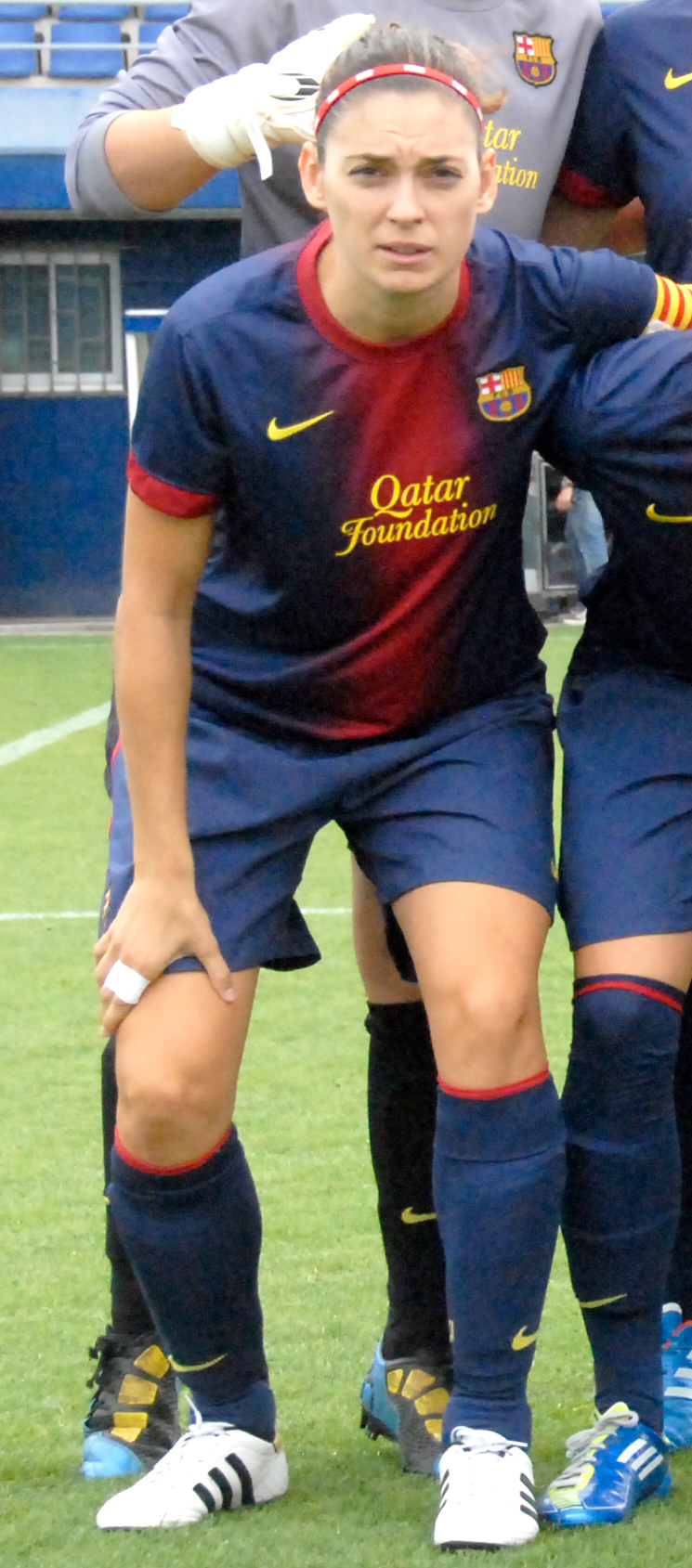
- Playing for Barcelona in 2012

Personal information
- Full name: Ana María Escribano López
- Date of birth: 2 December 1981 (age 44)
- Place of birth: Barcelona, Spain
- Position: Centre back

Team information
- Current team: Fontsanta Fatjó

Youth career
- FC Barcelona

Senior career*
Years	Team	Apps	(Gls)
2000–2013	FC Barcelona	140+	(8+)
2013	ÍBV	12	(2)
2014–2015	Sant Vicenç		
2015–2017	Fontsanta Fatjó	23	(7)

International career^{‡}
2009-10	Spain	6	(0)
- * Club domestic league appearances and goals ‡ National team caps and goals as of 09:56, 2 July 2016 (UTC)

Ana María "Ani" Escribano López (born 2 December 1981) is a Spanish retired footballer who played as a centre back. A former Spain women's national football team international, she spent 19 years with first club FC Barcelona and one season with ÍBV in Iceland's Úrvalsdeild kvenna.

== Club career ==
In her final season with Barcelona, she captained the team to the league and cup double. In September and October 2012 Escribano played in her first UEFA Women's Champions League matches, as Barcelona were thrashed 7–0 by Arsenal over two legs.

Escribano left Barcelona after 19 years in May 2013, signing for Icelandic club ÍBV. She scored twice in 12 league appearances for ÍBV. Escribano then decided to return to Spain, playing a season with Sant Vicenç, then joining Fontsanta Fatjó of the Preferente Femenina Catalana.

== International career ==
Escribano was part of the Spanish national team who competed in the 2011 FIFA Women's World Cup qualifiers.
