= Derbi Femení =

Football rivalry in Barcelona, Spain

Derbi femení
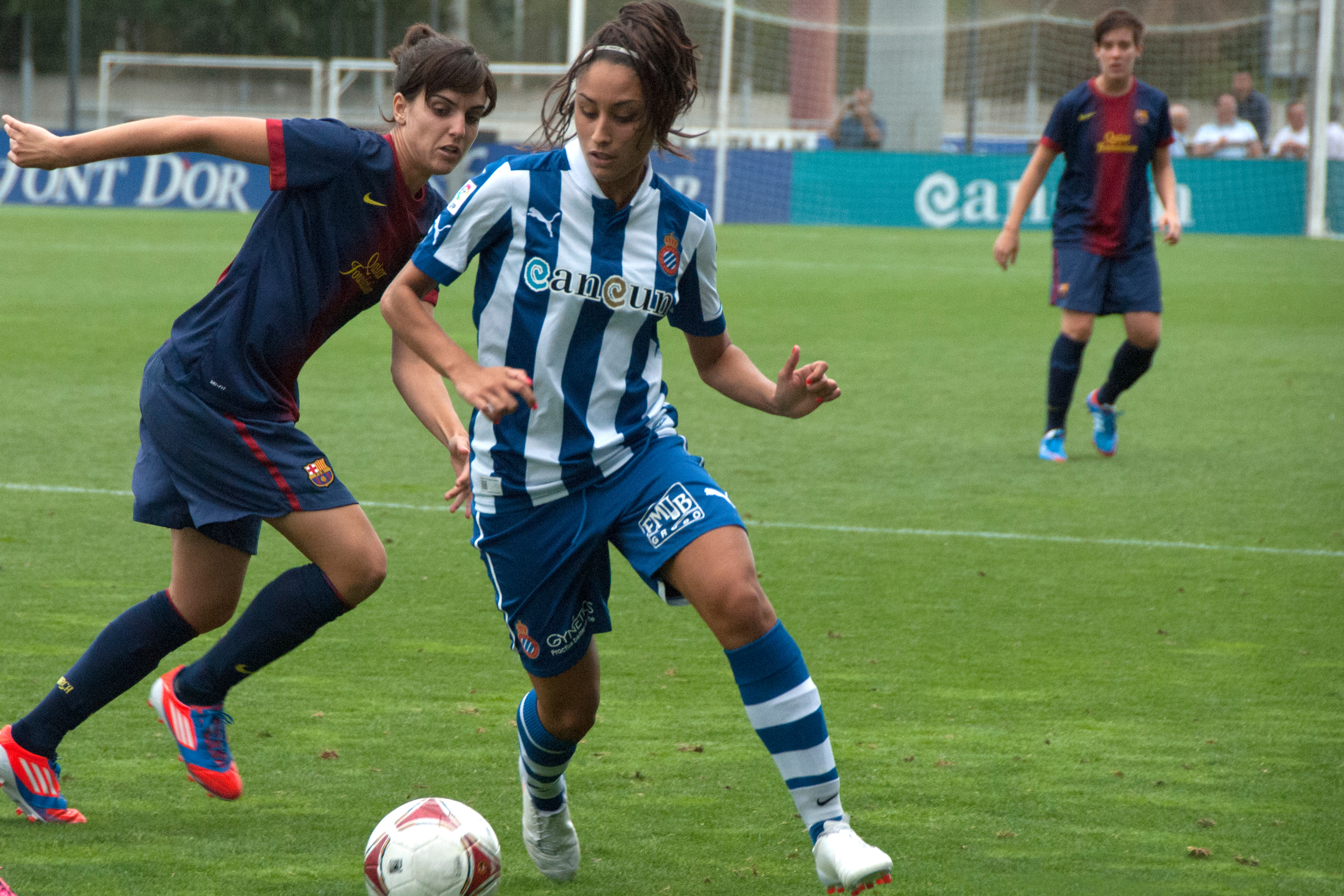
- Melanie Serrano, Débora García and Marta Unzué (L–R) in the 2012 Copa Catalunya final
- Location: Barcelona, Spain
- Teams: Barcelona; Espanyol
- First meeting: 28 March 1971; Pernod Cup Trophy; Barcelona 1–2 Espanyol
- Latest meeting: 22 April 2026; Liga F Espanyol 1–4 Barcelona

Statistics
- Total meetings: 43 (official matches)
- Most wins: Barcelona (24)
- Top scorer: Adriana Martín (16)
- Largest victory: 25 August 2018; Copa Catalunya; Barcelona 7–0 Espanyol

The derbi femení (Catalan pronunciation: [ˈðɛɾβi fəməˈni]; "women's derby") is the football rivalry between FC Barcelona Femení and RCD Espanyol Femení, the women's divisions of the main football clubs in the Barcelona metropolitan area.

Two of the first women's football teams in Spain, Barcelona and Espanyol first played against each other on 28 March 1971; in the 20th century, derby games were heavily contested and the teams became two of the most successful in Spain. Espanyol won the first Catalan league in 1972, and Barcelona won it in 1973.

In the 21st century, the teams have generally experienced opposite fortunes, first with Espanyol thriving while Barcelona battled relegation, a period lasting until 2012 – the year Espanyol lifted the Copa de la Reina and Barcelona won the league – before Barcelona began its domination and Espanyol struggled. In January 2021, the derby was held at the Camp Nou to celebrate 50 years since the first game, also played at the stadium. At the end of this season, Espanyol was relegated and Barcelona won a continental treble, both for the first time.

== All matches ==
As of 22 April 2026

=== Major competitions ===
Competition	Matches	Wins		Draws	Goals	
Competition	Matches	FCB	RCDE	Draws	FCB	RCDE
Superliga/Primera División/Liga F (2001–present)	38	21	12	5	92	63
Copa de la Reina (1983–present)	5	3	2	0	9	4
Total matches	43	24	14	5	101	67

=== Minor and defunct competitions ===
Competition		Matches	Wins		Draws	Goals	
Competition		Matches	FCB	RCDE	Draws	FCB	RCDE
Catalan cups	Pernod Cup (1971)	1	0	1	0	1	2
Catalan cups	Provincial Cup (1978–79)	1 (Note: For Espanyol (P. F. Blanquiazul) against Barcelona Atlètic)	0	0	1 (Note: Draw was Espanyol against Barcelona B)	1	1
Catalan cups	Copa Generalitat	2	1	0	1	2	1
Catalan cups	Copa Catalunya (2005–19; 2024–present) (Note: Between 2019 and 2024, the Copa Catalunya was an amateur-only competition, and neither team could take part.)	15	7	4	4 (Note: As a knockout competition, for all draws a winner was decided by penalty shoot-out. Barcelona won 3/4 draws.)	36	18
Leagues	Campeonato de Catalunya (1971–72)	2	0	1	1	0	1
Leagues	Copa Primavera (1973)	2	1	0	1	3	2
Leagues	Campeonato Nacional (1974)	2	0	0	2	1	1
Leagues	Campeonato Femenino (1979–80)	1	0	0	1	1	1
Leagues	Lliga Catalana (1981–88)	11 (Note: Including one match with an unknown result, and one Barcelona victory with an unknown scoreline.)	2	4	4	16+ (Note: One Barcelona victory has an unknown scoreline; the team has to have scored more.)	17
Leagues	Liga Nacional (1988–96)	4 (Note: As of 3 June 1990)	0	2	2	6	11
Leagues	División de Honor (1996–2001)						
Leagues	Segunda División/Segunda División Pro/Primera Federación (2007–08; 2021–24) (Note: Barcelona and Espanyol have never been in the second division at the same time, but have played each others' B team when in it)	8 (Note: 6 for Espanyol (against Barcelona B) and 2 for Barcelona (against Espanyol B))	4 (Note: 1 win for Barcelona, 3 wins for Barcelona B)	3 (Note: 2 wins for Espanyol, 1 win for Espanyol B)	1	22	15
Total matches		49	15	15	17	89+	70

=== Friendlies ===
Date	Home team	Score	Away team
8 December 1971	Barcelona	2–2	Espanyol
25 December 1971	Espanyol	?–?	Barcelona
20 January 1974	Espanyol	?–?	Barcelona
March 1974	Espanyol	1–3	Barcelona
7 November 1982	Barcelona	?–?	Espanyol
26 December 1984	Barcelona	1–0	Espanyol
26 December 1985	Espanyol	1–1 (5–4)	Barcelona

== Players ==
=== Goalscorers ===
As of 22 April 2026 (Note: Not all pre-2005 results and goalscorers are known)

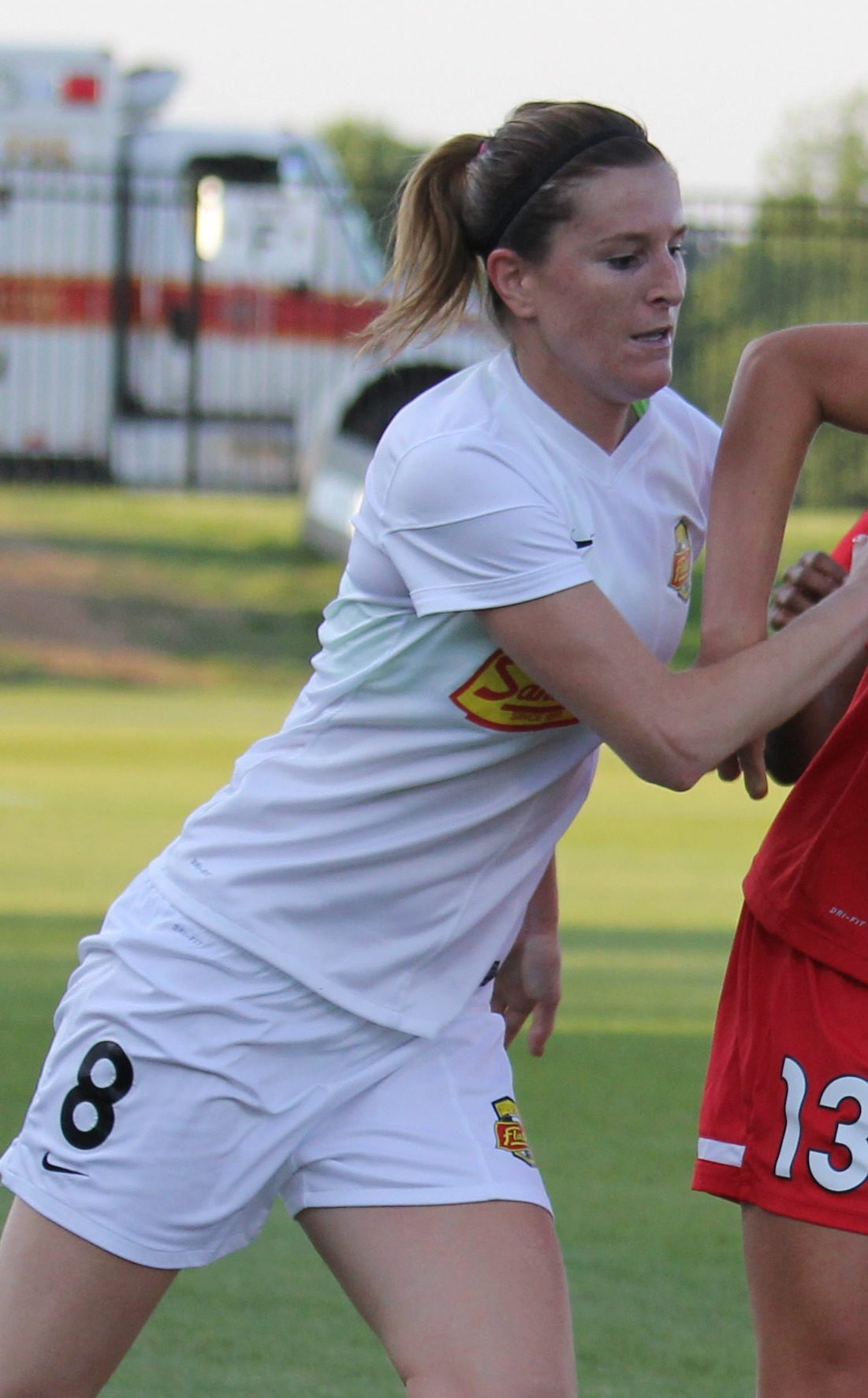
Adriana Martín has scored 16 goals in derby games, including hat-tricks for both teams

==== Top scorers ====
#	Player (Note: All Spanish unless noted otherwise)	Goals	League	Cup	Catalan Cup	Friendlies	Total
1	Adriana Martín	Espanyol (11); Barcelona (5)	9+5		2		16
2	Jenni Hermoso	Barcelona (12)	11		1		12
3	Sonia Bermúdez	Barcelona (10)	9		1		10
4	Marta Cubí	Espanyol (6); Barcelona (3)	3+1		3+2		9
4	**Alexia Putellas**	**Barcelona (9)**	7	1	1		9
6	Vero Boquete	Espanyol (8)	8				8
6	**Marta Torrejón**	Espanyol (4); **Barcelona (4)**	3+3		1+1		8
8	Sara Serna	Espanyol (7)	5		2		7
8	Olga García	Barcelona (7)	4	1	2		7
8	Noemí Rubio	Espanyol (7)	4		3		7
8	Mariona Caldentey	Barcelona (7)	4		3		7
12	Marta Corredera	Barcelona (5)	5				5
12	Bárbara Latorre	Barcelona (5)	3		2		5
12	Carol Miranda	Espanyol (5)	3		2		5
15	Willy Romero	Espanyol (1); Barcelona (3)	1+1		0+2		4
15	(England) Toni Duggan	Barcelona (4)	1	1	2		4
15	(Poland) **Ewa Pajor**	**Barcelona (4)**	4				4
18	Brenda Pérez	Espanyol (3)	3				3
18	Marta Unzué	Barcelona (3)	3				3
18	Vicky Losada	Barcelona (3)	3				3
18	(Netherlands) Lieke Martens	Barcelona (3)	3				3
18	Gemma Gili	Barcelona (3)	2		1		3
18	Nuri (1970s)	Barcelona (3)	2			1	3
18	(North Macedonia) Nataša Andonova	Barcelona (3)	1		2		3
25	Montse (1970s)	Espanyol (2)	2				2
25	Mayte (1980s)	Espanyol (2)	2				2
25	Rocío (2000s)	Espanyol (2)	2				2
25	Miriam Diéguez	Espanyol (2)	2				2
25	(Italy) Pamela Conti	Espanyol (2)	2				2
25	Carol Férez	Barcelona (2)	2				2
25	(Switzerland) Ana-Maria Crnogorčević	Barcelona (2)	2				2
25	(Norway) **Caroline Graham Hansen**	**Barcelona (2)**	2				2
25	Cristina Baudet	Espanyol (2)	2				2
25	Ariana Arias	Barcelona (2)	2				2
25	**Ona Baradad**	**Barcelona (2)**	2				2
25	(Paraguay) Lice Chamorro	Espanyol (2)	2				2
25	Júlia Bartel	Barcelona (2)	2				2
25	Judit Pablos	Espanyol (2)	2				2
25	Mapi Vilas	Espanyol (2)	1		1		2
25	(Norway) **Martine Fenger**	**Barcelona (2)**	2				2
25	Ruth García	Barcelona (2)	1		1		2
25	Melanie Serrano	Barcelona (2)	1		1		2
25	**Patricia Guijarro**	**Barcelona (2)**	1		1		2
25	**Aitana Bonmatí**	**Barcelona (2)**	1		1		2
25	**Clàudia Pina**	**Barcelona (2)**	1		1		2
25	(France) Kheira Hamraoui	Barcelona (2)			2		2
25	Encarna (1970s)	Espanyol (2)			2		2
25	Lolita Ortiz	Barcelona (2)				2	2

==== Hat-tricks ====
Player	Goals for	Minutes	Score after goals	Result	Date	Competition
Adriana Martín ^{4}	Barcelona	n/a	**4**–1 after all Martín's goals	**4**–4 (H)	15 September 2004	Superliga
Adriana Martín	Espanyol	20', 47', 72'	**1**–0, **2**–0, **5**–0	**5**–1 (H)	26 November 2006	Superliga
Vero Boquete	Espanyol	10', 76', 92'	**1**–0, **2**–0, **3**–1	**3**–1 (H)	21 November 2010	Superliga
Sonia Bermúdez	Barcelona	1', 28', 32'	**1**–0, **2**–0, **3**–0	**6**–0 (H)	11 May 2012	Primera División
Jenni Hermoso	Barcelona	39', 58', 64'	**3**–0, **4**–0, **5**–0	**7**–1 (H)	1 May 2016	Primera División
Jenni Hermoso	Barcelona	18', 40', 52'	0–**2**, 1–**3**, 1–**5**	1–**6** (A)	2 November 2016	Primera División
(Poland) Ewa Pajor	Barcelona	59', 85', 87'	**1**–1, **6**–1, **7**–1	**7**–1 (H)	13 October 2024	Liga F

(H) – Home; (A) – Away; (N) – Neutral venue (final)

^{4} – Player scored four goals.

=== Red cards ===
(red card) 1: Emilia Ibáñez (Barcelona), N. Sala (Espanyol), Laura Ràfols (Barcelona)

=== Players who played for both sides ===
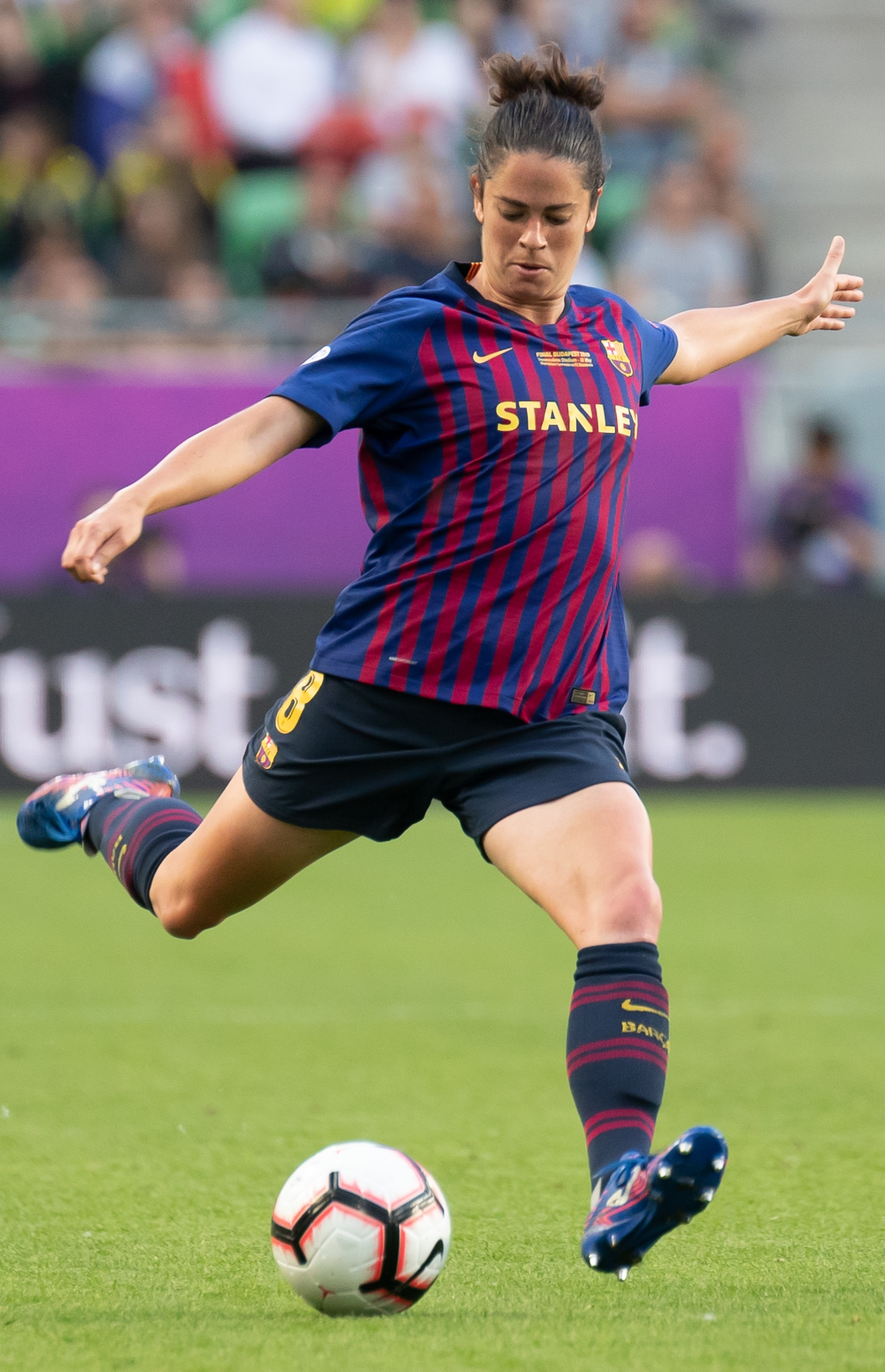
Marta Torrejón has spent more than a decade each at both Espanyol and Barcelona; has captained both teams; and has won titles for both teams in finals played against the other

There have been many players who have appeared for both Barcelona and Espanyol. In the 21st century, significant overlap was caused when Barcelona restructured their women's section in 2006–07. The youth teams were disbanded, with many of the 80 young players taken into Espanyol's stronger youth structure, and the women's team struggled, causing players to leave, including to Espanyol. There was also a significant player migration in the opposite direction in 2009 after Espanyol dismissed player Noemí Rubio due to her being a supporter of Barcelona, and Barcelona signed her and other players leaving the club.

Key
‡ Player has made appearances for both teams in derby matches.
Players in **bold** currently play for either team.

Player	Years	
Player	FCB	RCDE
Núria Llansà ‡	1970–74	1974–? (pre-1980)
Francina Pubill ‡	1978–83	1997–2000
Raquel Cabezón ‡	2005–06	1994–2005; 2006–07
Alba Montserrat ‡	1995–2003	2010–12
Olga Moreno	(pre-2001)	2001–02; 2005–10
Goretti Donaire ‡	1999–2001; 2005–06	2001–05
Adriana Martín ‡	2002–03; 2004–05	2005–09; ?–2022–?
Mariajo ‡	2003–05	2009–13; 2017–20
Míriam Diéguez ‡	2011–17	2002–10
**Marta Torrejón ‡**	2013–present	2001–2013
Natalia Arroyo		
Marta Cubí ‡	2009–10	2003–09
Vicky Losada ‡	2004–07; 2008–15; 2016–21	2007–08
Marina Marimon	?–2007	2007–?
Silvia Vila	?–2009	2009–?
Marta Yáñez	?–2009	2009–?
Laura Carriba	?–2009	2009–?
Ane Bergara ‡	2015–17	2005–11
Noemí Rubio ‡	2009–11	2005–09
**Alexia Putellas ‡**	2005–06; 2012–present	2006–11
Andrea Pereira ‡	2018–22	? (pre-2009)–2016
(Mexico) Kenti Robles ‡	2011–14	2006–11; 2014–15
Núria Garrote	?–2016	2016–?
Pilar Garrote	?–2016	2016–?
Anair Lomba		
Carol Férez ‡	? (pre-2007); 2009–14	2007–09
Marta Corredera ‡	2010–15	2006–10
Mapi Vilas ‡	2008–11	2011–13
"Willy" Romero	2013–15	2010–13
Cristina Baudet	?–2016	2016–?
**Clàudia Pina**	2013–present	2011–13 (Note: Subsidiary appearances only)
Elba Vergés	2011–13	2015–17; 2018–21
**Mapi León ‡**	2017–present	2013–14
Bárbara Latorre ‡	2015–19	2013–15
Anna Torrodà	2013–18	2018–20
María Llompart	2014–16	2016–19
Zaira Flores	2009–13; 2018–20	2015–17
**Arola Aparicio**‡	2013–15; 2019–20	2024–present
Andrea Giménez	2016–?	?–2016
Berta Pujadas	2015–17	2017–19
(Egypt) Sara Ismael	2019–22	2015–16
Aida Esteve	2017–20	2016–17
Emma Ramírez	2019–23	2017–19
Ainhoa Marín		
**Ona Baradad**‡	2021–25	2025–present

== See also ==
- Derbi barceloní
