= 2005–06 FC Barcelona Femení season =

FC Barcelona Femení
2005–06 season
- Chairman: Joan Laporta
- Manager: Natalia Astrain
- Stadium: Miniestadi Annex & Mini Estadi
- League: 8th
- Copa de la Reina: Quarterfinals
- Copa Catalunya: Runner-up
- Top goalscorer: Patty Pérez (8)
Home colours	Away colours

The 2005–06 season was the 10th for FC Barcelona Femení in the top flight of Spanish football.

== Summary ==
Barcelona finished eighth in the Superliga, which qualified them to compete in the Copa de la Reina – the first time they achieved this as an official section of the club. In the Copa de la Reina, they made it to the quarterfinals.

In the first edition of the Copa Catalunya, they finished as runners-up after losing to Espanyol in the final.

== Players ==
=== First team ===
As of

Note: Flags indicate national team as defined under FIFA eligibility rules; some limited exceptions apply. Players may hold more than one non-FIFA nationality.

No.	Pos.	Nation	Player
—	GK	(Spain) ESP	Marina Marimon
—	GK	(Spain) ESP	Cristina Molina
—	DF	(Spain) ESP	Ana María Escribano
—	DF	(Spain) ESP	Sarai Lucha
—	DF	(Spain) ESP	Sheila Sanchón
—	DF	(Spain) ESP	Ana Belén Fuertes "Kaki"
—	DF	(Spain) ESP	Melanie Serrano
—	DF	(Spain) ESP	Verónica Navarro
—	DF	(Spain) ESP	Mireia Chico
—	MF	(Spain) ESP	Alba Mena
—	MF	(Spain) ESP	Paulina Ferré

No.	Pos.	Nation	Player
—	MF	(Spain) ESP	Berta Carles
—	MF	(Spain) ESP	Alba Vilas
—	MF	(Spain) ESP	Goretti Donaire
—	MF	(Spain) ESP	Raquel Cabezón
—	MF	(Spain) ESP	Silvia Monje
—	MF	(Spain) ESP	Desiree Moya
—	MF	(Spain) ESP	Gemma Quer
—	FW	(Mexico) MEX	Patty Pérez
—	FW	(Spain) ESP	Judith Acedo
—	FW	(Mexico) MEX	Maribel Domínguez
—	FW	(Spain) ESP	Laia Ramón

FC Barcelona Femení B

Note: Flags indicate national team as defined under FIFA eligibility rules; some limited exceptions apply. Players may hold more than one non-FIFA nationality.

No.	Pos.	Nation	Player
—	DF	(Spain) ESP	Esther Romero

== Transfers ==
=== In ===
No.	Pos.	Nat.	Player	Moving from	Source
Summer
	FW	(Spain)	Goretti Donaire	Espanyol	
		(Spain)	Sarai Lucha		
		(Spain)	Mireia Chico		
		(Spain)	Paulina Ferré		
	MF	(Spain)	Raquel Cabezón	Espanyol	
	MF	(Mexico)	Patty Pérez		
		(Spain)	Silvia Monje		

=== Out ===
No.	Pos.	Nat.	Player	Moving to	Source
Summer
	GK	(Spain)	Mariajo	Levante	
		(Spain)	Carla Tomàs		
		(Spain)	Margalida Mas		
		(Spain)	Elia Giménez		
	FW	(Spain)	Adriana Martín	Espanyol	
	FW	(Romania)	Simona Vintilă	UD Fasnia	
		(Spain)	Zaida González		

== Competitions ==
Win Draw Loss

=== Copa Catalunya ===
26 August 2005 Semifinal	Barcelona	2–0	Sabadell	Barcelona
	Paulina; Maribel			Stadium: Nou Sardenya

28 August 2005 Final	Barcelona	0–1	Espanyol	Barcelona
			Carol Miranda	Stadium: Nou Sardenya

=== League ===
11 September 2005 1	Barcelona	2–2	AD Torrejón	Barcelona
	Patty Pérez 75' (pen.); Goretti 85'	Report		Stadium: Mini Estadi Annex

18 September 2005 2	Rayo Vallecano	1–1	Barcelona	Madrid
	Soni 18'	Report	Maribel 19'	Stadium: Nuestra Señora de la Torre; Referee: José Miguel Villanueva

25 September 2005 3	Barcelona	3–2	Oviedo Moderno	Barcelona
	Patty Pérez 39'; Monje 91'; Goretti 94' (pen.)	Report	Peque 12'; Eli 56'	Stadium: Mini Estadi Annex; Referee: Vico Moreno

2 October 2005 4	CD Híspalis	3–3	Barcelona	Seville
	Willy 14'; Avión 17'; Auxi 34'	Report	Patty Pérez 61'; Ani 87'; Sheila 89'	Stadium: Ciudad Deportiva José Ramón Cisneros Palacios; Referee: Antonio Santos

9 October 2005 5	Barcelona	0–3	Espanyol	Barcelona
		Report	Carol 45'; Torrejón 71'; Marta Cubí 82'	Stadium: Mini Estadi; Referee: Celso Capdequí Blanch

16 October 2005 6	Lagunak	3–1	Barcelona	Barañáin
	Profi 61'; Laura 75', 85'	Report	Patty Pérez 55'	Stadium: Servicio Municipal Lagunak; Referee: Erro Paris

23 October 2005 7	~~Barcelona~~	~~–~~	~~Sabadell~~
		Report
Note: Sabadell had retired from competition before this matchday, and as such the game was not played and discounted.

13 November 2005 8	Irex Puebla	2–0	Barcelona	Puebla de la Calzada
	Conchi 12', 31'	Report		Stadium: Estadio Municipal Extremadura; Referee: Paloma Quintero Siles

20 November 2005 9	Barcelona	0–2	Athletic Club	Barcelona
		Report	Vanessa 30'; Iraia 66'	Stadium: Mini Estadi; Referee: David Miranda Torres

27 November 2005 10	Gijón FF	1–5	Barcelona	Gijón
	Nuria 87' (pen.)	Report	Pau 5', 77'; Raquel 30'; Maribel 45'; Goretti 75'	Stadium: Campos de la Federación; Referee: García González

4 December 2005 11	Barcelona	3–0	Zaragoza CFF	Barcelona
	Goretti 20'; Patty Pérez 65'; Alba Vilas 82'	Report		Stadium: Mini Estadi Annex; Referee: Jiménez Acosta

8 December 2005 12	Levante	1–0	Barcelona	Valencia
	Pepa Crespo 43'	Report		Stadium: Poliesportiu de Nazaret; Referee: Óscar Ruiz García

11 December 2005 13	Barcelona	3–3	Estudiantes de Huelva	Barcelona
	Raquel 14'; Laia 50'; Maribel 60'	Report	Mari Jose 4', 25', 34'	Stadium: Mini Estadi Annex; Referee: José Emilio Sánchez Aparicio

18 December 2005 14	AD Torrejón	2–3	Barcelona	Torrejón de Ardoz
	Marta Mara 44', 56'	Report	Maribel 27', 90'; Raquel 66'	Stadium: Camp Las Veredillas; Referee: Roberto San José

8 January 2006 15	Barcelona	1–3	Rayo Vallecano	Barcelona
	Laia 42'	Report	Soni 15'; Marina 49'; Natalia Pablos 81' (pen.)	Stadium: Mini Estadi Annex; Referee: García Casas

15 January 2006 16	Oviedo Moderno	2–3	Barcelona	Oviedo
	Lore 69'; Sheila 95' (o.g.)	Report	Maribel 21'; Patty Pérez 49'; Pau 56'	Stadium: Estadio Manuel Díaz Vega; Referee: Daniel Díaz Iglesias

29 January 2006 17	Barcelona	0–1	CD Híspalis	Barcelona
		Report	Avión 49'	Stadium: Mini Estadi Annex; Referee: Sánchez Barbas

5 February 2006 18	Espanyol	7–1	Barcelona	Sant Adrià del Besòs
	Adriana 7', 23'; Marta Cubí 19'; Carol 52'; Sara Serna 85', 89'; Laura 87'	Report	Patty Pérez 20'	Stadium: Ciutat Esportiva de Sant Adrià; Referee: Jerez Riba

12 February 2006 19	Barcelona	2–3	Lagunak	Barcelona
	Raquel 88'; Maribel 90'	Report	Helen 24'; Laura 48'; Profi 71'	Stadium: Mini Estadi Annex; Referee: Francisco Oliva Bueno

19 February 2006 20	~~Sabadell~~	~~–~~	~~Barcelona~~
		Report
Note: Sabadell had retired from competition, and as such the game was not played and instead discounted.

26 February 2006 21	Barcelona	2–3	Irex Puebla	Barcelona
	Raquel 43'; Patty Pérez 77'	Report	Lali 42', 84'; Conchi 91'	Stadium: Mini Estadi Annex; Referee: Sánchez Barbas

5 March 2006 22	Athletic Club	3–0	Barcelona	Barakaldo
	Itziar 9'; Irune Murua 52'; Olabarrieta 57'	Report		Stadium: Estadi de Lasesarre; Referee: Lotina Díaz

13 March 2006 23	Barcelona	2–1	Gijón FF	Barcelona
	Laia 34'; Judith 48'	Report	Úrsula 64'	Stadium: Mini Estadi Annex; Referee: Company Jiménez

19 March 2006 24	Zaragoza CFF	0–1	Barcelona	Zaragoza
		Report	Judith 80'	Stadium: Campo Municipal de Fútbol de La Azucarera; Referee: Máximo Marín

2 April 2006 25	Barcelona	0–3	Levante	Barcelona
		Report	Grazielle 6', 24', 52'	Stadium: Mini Estadi Annex; Referee: Fernando Martínez

9 April 2006 26	Estudiantes de Huelva	0–3 w/o	Barcelona	La Palma del Condado
		Report		Stadium: Municipal de La Palma del Condado; Referee: Núñez García
Note: Due to the failings from Estudiantes de Huelva, Barcelona was awarded a 3–0 walkover victory.

=== Copa de la Reina ===
17 May 2006 Quarterfinal – Leg 1	Levante	1–0	Barcelona	Catarroja
	Ruth 64'	Report		Stadium: Estadi Mundial 82 (Catarroja); Referee: Ros Calvo

14 May 2006 Quarterfinal – Leg 2	Barcelona	0–3	Levante	Barcelona
		Report	Ruth 5'; Laura del Río 46'; Pepa Crespo 49'	Stadium: Mini Estadi Annex; Referee: Ochoa Díez
