= 2006–07 FC Barcelona Femení season =

FC Barcelona Femení
2006–07 season
- Chairman: Joan Laporta
- Manager: Xavi Llorens
- Stadium: Ciutat Esportiva Joan Gamper
- League: 14th & ▼ relegation
- Copa Catalunya: Runner-up
- Top goalscorer: Marta Unzué (6 goals)
Home colours	Away colours

The 2006–07 season was the 19th in official competition for FC Barcelona Femení, and their 11th in the top flight of Spanish football.

== Summary ==
Ahead of the 2006–07 season, the women's section was significantly restructured and integrated into the structure of (male) youth sections of the club. As a result, the five women's youth teams ceased to exist, leaving 80 young players without a club (many, including 12-year-old future star Alexia Putellas, went to the youth teams of Espanyol). Only the three senior teams (A, B, and C) from the women's section were planned to continue operating. The biggest stars of Barcelona Femení in Maribel Domínguez and Patricia Pérez, as well as coach Natalia Astrain, left the club. The changes, confirmed by Joan Laporta, were heavily criticised by parents of the displaced players, who called the club sexist and avaricious. Astrain was replaced as head coach by Xavi Llorens.

In the Copa Catalunya, the team finished runner-up after losing to Espanyol in the final. In September, the team began using the Ciutat Esportiva Joan Gamper as their main home ground, where they stayed until the Johan Cruyff Stadium was completed in 2019.

The team finished 14th, last, in the Superliga; their relegation to the Segunda División was confirmed in May, with suggestions that FC Barcelona may want to further reduce the section, dismantle it completely, or disassociate it.

== Players ==
=== First team ===
As of June 2007

Note: Flags indicate national team as defined under FIFA eligibility rules; some limited exceptions apply. Players may hold more than one non-FIFA nationality.

No.	Pos.	Nation	Player
—	GK	(Spain) ESP	Marina Marimon
—	GK	(Spain) ESP	Cristina Molina
—	DF	(Spain) ESP	Ana María Escribano
—	DF	(Spain) ESP	Sarai Lucha
—	DF	(Spain) ESP	Sheila Sanchón
—	DF	(Spain) ESP	Marta Unzué
—	DF	(Spain) ESP	Melanie Serrano
—	DF	(Spain) ESP	Esther Romero
—	DF	(Spain) ESP	Mireia Chico
—	MF	(Spain) ESP	Alba Mena

No.	Pos.	Nation	Player
—	MF	(Spain) ESP	Paulina Ferré
—	MF	(Spain) ESP	Berta Carles
—	MF	(Spain) ESP	Alba Vilas
—	MF	(Spain) ESP	Vicky Losada
—	FW	(Spain) ESP	Elba Unzué
—	FW	(Spain) ESP	Jessica Todo
—	FW	(Spain) ESP	Judith Acedo
—	FW	(Spain) ESP	Cristina Vega Bobo
—	FW	(Spain) ESP	Laia Ramón

=== Reserves ===
Players from Barcelona B who are eligible to play for the first team. Note: Flags indicate national team as defined under FIFA eligibility rules; some limited exceptions apply. Players may hold more than one non-FIFA nationality.

No.	Pos.	Nation	Player
—	DF	(Spain) ESP	Cynthia Pidal
—	DF	(Spain) ESP	Silvia Vila
—	DF	(Spain) ESP	Ana Maria Lara

No.	Pos.	Nation	Player
—	FW	(Spain) ESP	Marta Yáñez
—	FW	(Spain) ESP	Anaïr Lomba
—	FW	(Spain) ESP	Laura Carriba

== Transfers ==
=== In ===
No.	Pos.	Nat.	Player	Moving from	Source
Summer
	DF	(Spain)	Esther Romero	Barcelona B	
	MF	(Spain)	Vicky Losada	Barcelona B	
	DF	(Spain)	Marta Unzué	Osasuna	
	FW	(Spain)	Elba Unzué	Osasuna	
	FW	(Spain)	Jesica Todó		
	FW	(Spain)	Cristina Vega Bobo	Barcelona B	

=== Out ===
No.	Pos.	Nat.	Player	Moving to	Source
Summer
	FW	(Spain)	Goretti Donaire	Levante	
		(Spain)	Ana Belén Fuertes		
	MF	(Spain)	Raquel Cabezón	Espanyol	
	MF	(Mexico)	Patty Pérez		
	FW	(Mexico)	Maribel Domínguez	Free agent	
		(Spain)	Silvia Monje		
		(Spain)	Desiree Moya		
		(Spain)	Gemma Quer		
	DF	(Spain)	Verónica Navarro	Zaragoza	

== Pre-season and friendlies ==
=== Torneig de Getxo ===
6 April 2007 Group A, match 1	Lagunak	0–1	Barcelona	Getxo
		Report		Stadium: Estadi de Bolue

6 April 2007 Group A, match 3	Athletic Club	0–0	Barcelona	Getxo
		Report		Stadium: Estadi de Bolue

7 April 2007 Final	Real Sociedad	2–3	Barcelona	Getxo
		Report		Stadium: Municipal de Fadura

== Competitions ==
Win Draw Loss

=== Copa Catalunya ===
25 August 2006 Semifinal	Barcelona	2–0	UE Lleida	Barcelona
	Paulina; Lombi			Stadium: Nou Sardenya

28 August 2006 Final	Barcelona	1–7	Espanyol	Barcelona
	Berta Carles 58'		Ane 8'; Marta Cubí 9'; Sara 13'; Adriana 52'; Carol 55'; Noemí 68' (pen.), 72'	Stadium: Nou Sardenya

=== League ===
10 September 2006 1	Zaragoza CFF	1–0	Barcelona	Zaragoza
	Vero Boquete 72'	Report		Stadium: Estadio Pedro Sancho; Referee: Sergio Usón

17 September 2006 2	Barcelona	4–2	Oviedo Moderno	Sant Joan Despí
	Pau 35'; Unzué 40'; Judith 53'; Lombi 93'	Report	Alba Castaño 68'; Peque 73'	Stadium: Ciutat Esportiva Joan Gamper; Referee: Jordi Molina Fernández

8 October 2006 3	Levante	1–0	Barcelona	Valencia
	Monforte 54'	Report		Stadium: Poliesportiu de Nazaret; Referee: Ruiz García

15 October 2006 4	Barcelona	2–1	Sporting Huelva	Sant Joan Despí
	Unzué 58' (pen.); Judith 60'	Report	Rita 9'	Stadium: Ciutat Esportiva Joan Gamper; Referee: Rodríguez

22 October 2006 5	Barcelona	0–2	SD Lagunak	Sant Joan Despí
		Report	Txiki 87'; Uxue 89'	Stadium: Ciutat Esportiva Joan Gamper; Referee: Dídac Durán

29 October 2006 6	Atlético de Madrid	0–1	Barcelona	Majadahonda
		Report	Melanie Serrano 88'	Stadium: Cerro del Espino; Referee: Jorge Barba

5 November 2006 7	Barcelona	1–1	Rayo Vallecano	Sant Joan Despí
	Elba		?	Stadium: Ciutat Esportiva Joan Gamper

12 November 2006 8	Torrejón	1–0	Barcelona	Torrejón de Ardoz
	Cheni 75'	Report		Stadium: Camp Las Veredillas; Referee: Martínez Solana

19 November 2006 9	Barcelona	2–3	Athletic Club	Sant Joan Despí
	Sheila 88'; Mireia 90'	Report	Tzibi 11'; Erika Vázquez 29'; Irune Murua 43'	Stadium: Ciutat Esportiva Joan Gamper; Referee: Company Jiménez

26 November 2006 10	Espanyol	5–1	Barcelona	Sant Adrià del Besòs
	Adriana 20', 47', 72'; Sara Serna 61', 62'	Report	Lombi 87'	Stadium: Ciutat Esportiva de Sant Adrià; Referee: García García

3 December 2006 11	Barcelona	1–2	Irex Puebla	Sant Joan Despí
	Unzué 8'	Report	Mari Jose 1'; Priscila 44'	Stadium: Ciutat Esportiva Joan Gamper; Referee: José Manuel Vico Moreno

10 December 2006 12	Real Sociedad	2–1	Barcelona	Zubieta
	Lau 27'; Itxaso 35'	Report	Bobo 81'	Stadium: Zubieta Facilities; Referee: Fuentes Vicente

17 December 2006 13	Barcelona	1–3	CD Híspalis	Sant Joan Despí
	Mireia 61'	Report	Gimbert 24'; Rocío Ríos 68'; Auxi 71'	Stadium: Ciutat Esportiva Joan Gamper; Referee: García

21 January 2007 14	Barcelona	1–1	Zaragoza CFF	Sant Joan Despí
	Berta 92'	Report	Sira 46'	Stadium: Ciutat Esportiva Joan Gamper; Referee: Corredor Pérez

28 January 2007 15	Oviedo Moderno	0–0	Barcelona	Oviedo
		Report		Stadium: Estadio Manuel Díaz Vega; Referee: Pablo Nanclares Centeno

4 February 2007 16	Barcelona	0–2	Levante	Sant Joan Despí
		Report	Laura del Río 10'; Goretti 47'	Stadium: Ciutat Esportiva Joan Gamper; Referee: Rebollo López

11 February 2007 17	Sporting Club de Huelva	2–1	Barcelona	Huelva
	Rita 60'; Liliana 85' (pen.)	Report	Unzué 11'	Stadium: Ciudad Deportiva de Huelva; Referee: Núñez García

18 February 2007 18	Lagunak	1–1	Barcelona	Barañáin
	Irene 19'	Report	Judith 67'	Stadium: Servicio Municipal Lagunak; Referee: Ballano

25 February 2007 19	Barcelona	0–1	Atlético de Madrid	Sant Joan Despí
		Report	Paloma 68'	Stadium: Ciutat Esportiva Joan Gamper; Referee: Sánchez Aparicio

11 March 2007 20	Rayo Vallecano	1–3	Barcelona	Madrid
		Report		Stadium: Nuestra Señora de la Torre

18 March 2007 21	Barcelona	0–3	Torrejón	Sant Joan Despí
		Report	Puche 17'; Cheni 78'; Marga 89'	Stadium: Ciutat Esportiva Joan Gamper; Referee: Alfonso Oliva Bueno

25 March 2007 22	Athletic Club	5–0	Barcelona	Barakaldo
	Orueta 7'; Gurutze 21'; Itziar 43'; Irune Murua 84'; Jessi 90'	Report		Stadium: Estadi de Lasesarre; Referee: Isturiz Latorre

1 April 2007 23	Barcelona	1–7	Espanyol	Sant Joan Despí
	Jessica 29'	Report	Noemí 49', 87'; Adriana 53'; Marta Cubí 55', 65'; Carol 73'; Sara Serna 83'	Stadium: Ciutat Esportiva Joan Gamper; Referee: Jorge Pérez Fuentes

22 April 2007 24	Irex Puebla	3–2	Barcelona	Puebla de la Calzada
	Priscila 20', 50', 54'	Report	Jessica 5'; Melanie Serrano 41'	Stadium: Municipal Extremadura; Referee: Paloma Quintero

29 April 2007 25	Barcelona	1–3	Real Sociedad	Sant Joan Despí
	Unzué 59'	Report	Evelyn 50'; Aintzane 85'; Lau 89'	Stadium: Ciutat Esportiva Joan Gamper; Referee: Liarte Pérez

6 May 2007 26	CD Híspalis	5–2	Barcelona	Sevilla
	Auxi 4', 59', 86'; Gimbert 29'; Avión 46'	Report	Melanie Serrano 33'; Laura 83'	Stadium: Ciudad Deportiva José Ramón Cisneros Palacios; Referee: Álvarez García
