= Galicia women's national football team =

Galicia
- Nickname: A Irmandiña (The Fellowship)
- Association: Galician Football Federation
- Head coach: Victoria Kloock
- Captain: Verónica Boquete
- Most caps: Verónica Boquete (3)
- Top scorer: María Paz Vilas (3)
First colours

The Galicia women's football team is the official football team of the Spanish autonomous community of Galicia. It is organised by the Galician Football Federation. It is not affiliated with FIFA or UEFA and therefore it is only allowed to play friendly matches.

== Results ==
| 27 December 2007 | Galicia (Galicia (Spain)) | 1–6 | Catalonia | Vigo |
| 18:00 | Vilas 20' | Report | Diéguez 1', 5'; Serna 40', 44'; Serrano 59'; Georgina Carreras 73' | Stadium: Balaídos; Referee: Elena Casal |

| 28 December 2008 | Galicia (Galicia (Spain)) | 7–1 | Balearic Islands | Pontevedra |
| 18:00 | Vilas 3', 78'; Ríos 41', 55'; Boquete 59', 73'; Lomba 65' | Report | Cladera 84' | Stadium: Estadio Municipal de Pasarón; Attendance: 2,500; Referee: López Herves |

| 22 December 2016 | Galicia (Galicia (Spain)) | 0–5 | Catalonia | Vilagarcia de Arousa |
| 19:00 | | Report | Ferez 5'; Putellas 9'; O.García 26', 37'; Llamas 68' | Stadium: A Lomba; Attendance: 4,500; Referee: Elena Casal |

== Head Coaches ==
- Pilar Neira (2007–2008)
- Victoria Kloock (2016)

== Players ==
=== Squad ===
The following players were called up for the match against Catalonia on 22 December 2016.

Caps and goals as of 31 December 2016

Head coach: Pilar Neira

| No. | Pos. | Player | Date of birth (age) | Caps | Goals | Club |
Goalkeeper
| | GK | Sheila Fernández | March 21, 1997 (age 29) | 1 | 0 | (Galicia (Spain)) Victoria CF |
| | GK | Ana González | January 8, 1995 (age 31) | 1 | 0 | (Galicia (Spain)) Club Peñasco |
Defender
| | DF | María Arufe | September 24, 1994 (age 31) | 1 | 0 | (Galicia (Spain)) Atlético Arousana |
| | DF | Nerea Carballo | May 19, 1995 (age 31) | 1 | 0 | (Galicia (Spain)) SCD Atlántida Matamá |
| | DF | Patricia Carballo | February 16, 1996 (age 30) | 1 | 0 | (United States) Georgia Southern Eagles |
| | DF | Desirée Gardon | October 31, 1992 (age 33) | 1 | 0 | retired |
| | DF | Lara Martínez | December 27, 2000 (age 25) | 1 | 0 | (Galicia (Spain)) SCD Atlántida Matamá |
| | DF | Carla Otero | July 1, 1995 (age 31) | 1 | 0 | (Galicia (Spain)) SCD Atlántida Matamá |
| | DF | Miriam Ríos | December 2, 1987 (age 38) | 2 | 2 | (Canary Islands) Real Unión de Tenerife |
Midfielder
| | MF | Teresa Abelleira | February 10, 2000 (age 26) | 1 | 0 | (Community of Madrid) Real Madrid |
| | MF | Verónica Boquete (c) | April 9, 1987 (age 39) | 3 | 2 | (Italy) AC Milan |
| | MF | Sandra González | February 6, 1991 (age 35) | 1 | 0 | (Galicia (Spain)) Sárdoma CF |
| | MF | Laura Souto | July 9, 1993 (age 33) | 1 | 0 | (Galicia (Spain)) Umia CF |
| | MF | Eva Luz Villar | March 7, 1984 (age 42) | 1 | 0 | retired |
Forward
| | FW | Natalia De Francisco | January 19, 1990 (age 36) | 1 | 0 | (Galicia (Spain)) Viajes Interrías |
| | FW | Belén Fernández | August 3, 1996 (age 30) | 1 | 0 | (Galicia (Spain)) Atlético Arousana |
| | FW | Carolina González | December 31, 1991 (age 34) | 1 | 0 | (Canary Islands) CD Femarguín |
| | FW | María Paz Vilas | January 2, 1988 (age 38) | 2 | 3 | (Andalusia) Real Betis |

=== Previous call-ups ===
| Pos. | Player | Date of birth (age) | Caps | Goals | Club | Latest call-up |
|---|---|---|---|---|---|---|
| GK | Maite Soage | | 1 | 0 | | v. Balearic Islands; December 28, 2008 |
| GK | Ana Rosa Durán | September 10, 1989 (age 36) | 1 | 0 | SCD Atlántida Matamá | v. Balearic Islands; December 28, 2008 |
| DF | Vanesa Hermida | January 13, 1989 (age 37) | 1 | 0 | Atletic Camp Clar | v. Balearic Islands; December 28, 2008 |
| DF | Cristina Lago | May 19, 1985 (age 41) | 2 | 0 | Victoria CF | v. Balearic Islands; December 28, 2008 |
| DF | Rita Lema | | 1 | 0 | | v. Balearic Islands; December 28, 2008 |
| DF | Victoria Kloock | November 19, 1990 (age 35) | 1 | 0 | Sárdoma CF | v. Balearic Islands; December 28, 2008 |
| DF | Mónica Vidal | | 2 | 0 | | v. Balearic Islands; December 28, 2008 |
| MF | Carolina Baños | June 15, 1979 (age 47) | 1 | 0 | Atlético Arousana | v. Balearic Islands; December 28, 2008 |
| MF | Ana Buceta | December 4, 1992 (age 33) | 1 | 0 | Real Oviedo | v. Catalonia; December 27, 2007 |
| MF | Miriam Domínguez | July 21, 1989 (age 37) | 2 | 0 | Umia CF | v. Balearic Islands; December 28, 2008 |
| MF | Carla González | June 6, 1991 (age 35) | 1 | 0 | | v. Balearic Islands; December 28, 2008 |
| MF | Sara "Tui" González | May 23, 1989 (age 37) | 2 | 0 | Madrid CFF | v. Balearic Islands; December 28, 2008 |
| MF | "Charo" Ramos | February 18, 1979 (age 47) | 1 | 0 | retired | v. Catalonia; December 27, 2007 |
| FW | Anair Lomba | October 30, 1989 (age 36) | 2 | 1 | RCD Espanyol | v. Balearic Islands; December 28, 2008 |
| FW | Joana Montouto | May 5, 1990 (age 36) | 2 | 0 | Sárdoma CF | v. Balearic Islands; December 28, 2008 |

== Notable players ==
Galician players who represented FIFA international teams

- Teresa Abelleira
- Pilar Artime
- Natacha Astray
- Verónica Boquete
- Inmaculada Castañón
- Adela Castro
- Lis Franco
- María del Carmen Iparraguire
- Aurora Martínez
- Ángeles Olmo
- Pauleta
- Encarnación Pérez
- Nuria Rábano
- Charo Ramos
- Carmencita Rodríguez
- María Paz Vilas

== See also ==
- Galicia men's national football team
