= Ainhoa Tirapu =

Spanish footballer

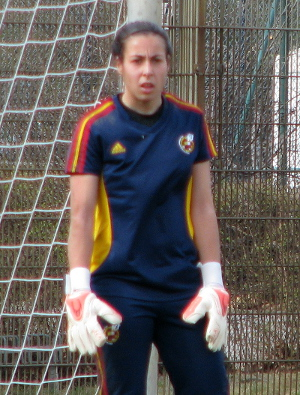

Personal information
- Full name: Ainhoa Tirapu de Goñi
- Date of birth: 4 September 1984 (age 42)
- Place of birth: Pamplona, Spain
- Height: 1.70 m (5 ft 7 in)
- Position: Goalkeeper

Senior career*
Years	Team	Apps	(Gls)
- Lagunak
2005	Puebla		
2005–2020	Athletic Bilbao	322	(0)

International career
2007–2015	Spain	46	(0)
2006–2017	Basque Country	6	(0)
- * Club domestic league appearances and goals

Ainhoa Tirapu de Goñi (born 4 September 1984) is a Spanish retired footballer who played as a goalkeeper. She spent most of her club career at Athletic Bilbao, and was a member of the Spain national squad for almost a decade.

== Club career ==
Tirapu began her career at SD Lagunak and played in the 2005 Copa de la Reina for CF Puebla. She then signed for Athletic Bilbao, who had just won their third Superliga Femenina in a row, as a replacement for the retiring Eli Capa. In August 2005 she played her first match for Athletic in the 2005–06 UEFA Women's Cup's qualifying stage, a 6–2 victory over Scottish champions Glasgow City.

From 2006 to 2020, Ainhoa was Athletic's first choice goalkeeper. She won two Primera División titles with Athletic in 2006–07 and 2015–16.

== International career ==
In 2002 Tirapu was part of the Spanish national under-19 squad which competed in the UEFA Women's Under-19 Championship finals in Sweden.

Tirapu made her senior Spain senior national team debut in the second game of the UEFA Women's Euro 2009 qualifying series; a 2–2 draw against the Czech Republic in Plzeň on 27 October 2007. She remained as Spain's first choice goalkeeper for the rest of the stage, which ended in a 4–0 play-off defeat to the Netherlands. She also retained the position during the 2011 FIFA Women's World Cup qualification campaign.

In June 2013 national team coach Ignacio Quereda selected Tirapu in the Spain squad for UEFA Women's Euro 2013 in Sweden. She was a mainstay of the team which negotiated the group stage before being beaten 3–1 by Norway in the quarter final. She was part of Spain's squad at the 2015 FIFA Women's World Cup.

She also represented the Basque Country national team.

== Personal life ==
Tirapu has a degree in chemistry and a master's degree in environmental contagion and toxicology from the University of the Basque Country. While playing in the youth ranks of SD Lagunak she was given the nickname "Sensi" by teammates Marta Moreno and Erika Vázquez, due to her perceived sensitivity to being hurt by the ball. The nickname remained with Tirapu throughout her career.

The ex-footballer brothers Fernando Tirapu and Mariano Tirapu are distant relatives of Ainhoa.

== Honours ==
Athletic Bilbao

- Primera División: 2006–07, 2015–16
