= 2009 Copa de la Reina de Fútbol =

Tournament details
- Country: Spain
- Teams: 8

Final positions
- Champions: Espanyol (4th title)
- Runners-up: Prainsa Zaragoza

Tournament statistics
- Matches played: 13
- Goals scored: 52 (4 per match)
- Top goal scorer(s): Adriana Martín (10 goals)

The 2009 Copa de la Reina is the 27th edition of the competition, taking place between May 24 and June 21, 2009. The final was held in La Romareda, in Zaragoza.

== Qualified teams ==
Position	Club	Played	Points	Wins	Draws	Losses	Goals For	Goals Against
1	Rayo Vallecano	30	81	26	3	1	98	16
2	Levante	30	76	24	4	2	86	17
3	Athletic Club	30	65	21	2	7	100	43
4	Espanyol	30	60	18	6	6	71	25
5	Prainsa Zaragoza	30	51	15	6	9	52	33
6	Barcelona	30	49	14	7	9	48	32
7	Atlético de Madrid	30	48	14	6	10	49	33
8	Torrejón	30	38	12	2	16	52	68

== Results ==
=== Quarter finals ===
Team 1	Agg.	Team 2	1st leg	2nd leg
Rayo Vallecano	7–1	Torrejón	6–1	1–0
Levante	4–5	Espanyol	2–2	2–3
Athletic Club	2–4	Barcelona	2–1	0–3
Atlético de Madrid	1–4	Prainsa Zaragoza	0–2	1–2

=== Semifinals ===
Team 1	Agg.	Team 2	1st leg	2nd leg
Rayo Vallecano Femenino	5–5	Espanyol	4–2	1–3
Prainsa Zaragoza	6–2	Barcelona	3–1	3–1

=== Final ===
21 June 2009
12:00 CEST

Prainsa Zaragoza	1–5	Espanyol
Coronel 3'	Report	Meseguer 12'; A. Martín 30', 45', 49', 78'

La Romareda, Zaragoza
Attendance: 8,000
Referee: Eduardo Prieto Iglesias

Prainsa Zaragoza	Espanyol

GK	13	(Spain) Pilar Velilla
DF	2	(Spain) Almudena Merino
DF	4	(Spain) Vicky Belmonte	(yellow card) 49'
DF	7	(Spain) Laura Folch
DF	14	(Portugal) Sónia Matias
MF	6	(Portugal) Cláudia Neto		(substituted off) 71'
MF	11	(Spain) Mayte Casas		(substituted off) 75'
MF	20	(Argentina) Mariela Coronel
FW	17	(Spain) Julia Vera		(substituted off) 56'
FW	9	(Portugal) Ana Borges
FW	8	(Portugal) Edite Fernandes		(substituted off) 56'
Substitutes:
DF	3	(Spain) Leticia Carballal		(substituted in) 71'
MF	16	(Spain) Marieta López		(substituted in) 56'
DF	18	(Spain) Sira Abad		(substituted in) 75'
MF	19	(Argentina) Clarisa Huber	(yellow card) 83'	(substituted in) 56'
Manager:
(Spain) Alberto Berna

GK	1	(Spain) Cristina Prieto
DF	3	(Spain) Chola
DF	2	(Spain) Ane Bergara	(substituted off) 87'
DF	5	(Spain) Marta Torrejón
DF	3	(Spain) Rocío Serrano
MF	14	(Spain) Míriam Diéguez
MF	11	(Spain) Sara Serna	(substituted off) 56'
MF	15	(Spain) Silvia Meseguer	(substituted off) 82'
MF	17	(Spain) Marta Corredera	(substituted off) 86'
FW	20	(Spain) Vero Boquete
FW	10	(Spain) Adriana Martín
Substitutes:
MF	6	(Spain) Lara Rabal	(substituted in) 87'
FW	8	(Spain) Carolina Miranda	(substituted in) 82'
FW	12	(Spain) Joana Montouto	(substituted in) 56'
FW		(Spain) Marta Yáñez	(substituted in) 86'
Manager:
(Spain) Diego Morata

Copa de la Reina 2008–09 Winners
RCD Espanyol
5th title
