= 2008–09 Superliga Femenina =

Superliga
- Season: 2008–09
- Champions: Rayo Vallecano (1st title)
- Relegated: Extremadura FCF; Pozuelo de Alarcón
- Champions League: Rayo Vallecano

The 2008–09 season of the female football Superliga Femenina started on 7 September 2008 and finished on 10 May 2009.

Rayo Vallecano won the league for the first time in its history.

== Teams ==
CFF Puebla merged to Extremadura Femenino CF and was relocated to Almendralejo.

Club	City	Stadium
Athletic Bilbao	Bilbao	Lezama
Atlético Madrid	Madrid	Estadio Cerro del Espino
Atlético Málaga	Málaga	Malaka
Barcelona	Barcelona	Ciutat Esportiva Joan Gamper
Colegio Alemán	Valencia	Campus Universitario Els Tarongers
Espanyol	Barcelona	Ciutat Esportiva de Sant Adrià del Besòs
Extremadura FCF	Almendralejo	Estadio Francisco de la Hera
L'Estartit	Torroella de Montgrí	Municipal de L'Estartit
Lagunak	Barañáin	Sociedad Lagunak
Levante	Valencia	Polideportivo Municipal de Nazaret
Pozuelo de Alarcón	Pozuelo de Alarcón	Polideportivo Valle de las Cañas
Prainsa Zaragoza	Zaragoza	Campos Federación Pedro Sancho
Rayo Vallecano	Madrid	Estadio Teresa Rivero
Real Sociedad	San Sebastián	Zubieta
Sporting Huelva	Huelva	Campo Federativo de "La Orden"
Torrejón	Torrejón de Ardoz	Las Veredillas

== League table ==
Pos	Team	Pld	W	D	L	GF	GA	GD	Pts	Relegation
1	Rayo Vallecano (C)	30	26	3	1	98	16	+82	81	Qualification to UEFA Women's Champions League and Copa de la Reina
2	Levante	30	24	2	4	86	17	+69	74	Qualification to Copa de la Reina
3	Athletic Bilbao	30	21	2	7	100	43	+57	65	Qualification to Copa de la Reina
4	Espanyol	30	18	6	6	71	25	+46	60	Qualification to Copa de la Reina
5	Prainsa Zaragoza	30	15	6	9	52	33	+19	51	Qualification to Copa de la Reina
6	Barcelona	30	14	7	9	48	32	+16	49	Qualification to Copa de la Reina
7	Atlético Madrid	30	14	6	10	49	33	+16	48	Qualification to Copa de la Reina
8	Torrejón	30	12	2	16	52	68	−16	38	Qualification to Copa de la Reina
9	Sporting Huelva	30	10	7	13	43	48	−5	37	
10	Real Sociedad	30	9	6	15	28	46	−18	33	
11	Lagunak	30	9	5	16	29	59	−30	32	
12	L'Estartit	30	9	4	17	48	72	−24	31	
13	Atlético Málaga	30	8	2	20	33	84	−51	26	
14	Colegio Alemán	30	8	1	21	39	81	−42	25	
15	Extremadura FCF (R)	30	6	2	22	28	64	−36	20	Relegation to Liga Nacional
16	Pozuelo de Alarcón (R)	30	5	1	24	32	115	−83	16	Relegation to Liga Nacional

Source: Arquero Arba
Rules for classification: 1) Points; 2) Head-to-head points; 3) Head-to-head goal difference; 4) Goal difference; 5) Goals scored.
(C) Champions; (R) Relegated

== Results ==
Home \ Away	ATH	ATM	MGA	BAR	CAL	ESP	EXT	EST	LAG	LEV	POZ	ZAR	RAY	RSO	SPH	TOR
Athletic Bilbao	—	6–1	10–0	0–0	6–2	4–1	5–0	3–1	3–0	0–2	11–0	4–1	0–4	2–0	1–0	9–3
Atlético Madrid	0–1	—	2–0	1–0	6–0	1–1	2–0	1–2	1–2	1–1	4–1	1–1	0–1	0–1	2–2	3–0
Atlético Málaga	1–2	0–3	—	0–3	5–2	2–2	1–0	2–2	2–1	0–1	5–2	0–2	1–4	2–1	1–0	2–3
Barcelona	3–4	2–0	4–0	—	1–0	0–2	2–0	0–0	3–0	1–1	4–0	0–3	0–0	3–0	0–2	2–0
Colegio Alemán	2–8	2–3	2–1	2–1	—	4–0	4–2	2–0	3–3	0–3	2–3	1–2	0–6	2–0	2–1	1–3
Espanyol	3–0	2–1	7–1	2–3	3–0	—	1–0	1–0	1–0	1–2	6–1	0–0	0–1	2–0	0–0	5–0
Extremadura FCF	2–3	0–2	1–2	0–1	2–0	2–3	—	0–0	3–0	0–6	4–2	1–0	1–2	1–0	0–1	3–1
L'Estartit	2–3	1–3	3–1	2–3	2–0	0–6	4–1	—	2–2	2–3	4–2	3–1	1–2	3–0	4–1	4–3
Lagunak	1–4	0–2	2–1	0–2	0–4	1–1	1–0	2–1	—	0–3	3–1	1–0	1–7	1–1	1–0	0–0
Levante	4–2	0–2	3–0	4–0	6–0	1–0	3–0	6–1	3–0	—	6–1	2–1	1–1	7–0	2–0	2–0
Pozuelo de Alarcón	0–4	0–3	4–1	0–4	1–0	1–8	2–2	3–2	2–3	0–4	—	1–2	2–5	3–0	0–1	0–4
Prainsa Zaragoza	4–1	3–1	5–0	1–0	3–0	0–0	3–1	3–0	2–0	0–1	2–0	—	0–1	3–0	1–1	4–2
Rayo Vallecano	3–0	2–0	7–0	4–1	3–0	0–1	2–0	6–0	2–0	2–0	9–0	6–1	—	4–3	8–0	3–2
Real Sociedad	0–0	1–1	2–0	1–1	1–0	0–3	4–0	3–0	1–0	0–0	3–0	0–0	0–1	—	2–1	2–3
Sporting Huelva	2–1	0–0	1–2	1–1	3–1	0–3	2–1	3–1	1–3	2–5	5–0	2–2	1–1	3–0	—	2–1
Torrejón	1–3	1–2	3–0	2–2	3–1	0–3	2–1	3–1	2–1	0–4	4–0	3–2	0–2	0–2	3–2	—

Source: Arquero Arba
Legend: Blue = home team win; Yellow = draw; Red = away team win.
