= Catalonia women's national football team =

Catalonia
- Nickname: Les Segadores (The Reapers)
- Association: Catalan Football Federation
- Confederation: None
- Head coach: Xavier Llorens
- Captain: Marta Torrejón
- Most caps: Débora García (6) and Núria Mendoza (6)
- Top scorer: Carolina Férez (3) and Olga García (3)
First colours	Second colours

The Catalonia women's football team (Catalan: Selecció feminina de futbol de Catalunya) is the official football team of the Spanish autonomous community of Catalonia. It is organised by the Catalan Football Federation. It is not affiliated with FIFA or UEFA and therefore it is allowed to play only friendly matches.

== Results ==
27 December 2007	Galicia	1–6	Catalonia	Vigo
18:00	María Paz Vilas 20'	Report	1' 5' Miriam Diéguez; 40' 44' Sara Serna; 59' Rocío Serrano; 73' Georgina Carreras	Stadium: Balaídos; Referee: Elena Casal

27 December 2014 2015 Centenary Trophy	Basque Country	1–1	Catalonia	Barakaldo
18:30	María Diáz Cirauqui 18'	Report	Olga García 6'	Stadium: Lasesarre; Referee: Carlos Arriola

26 December 2015 2015 Centenary Trophy	Catalonia	1–1 (3–4 p)	Basque Country	Barcelona
18:45	Corredera 90+1'	Report	75' Beristain	Stadium: Mini Estadi; Attendance: 4,106; Referee: Rebollo López
	Penalties
	Serna (penalty missed); Putellas (penalty scored); Mendoza (penalty scored); Corredera (penalty scored); Carreras (penalty missed)		(penalty scored) Beristain; (penalty scored) Lareo; (penalty scored) Corres; (penalty scored) Baños

22 December 2016	Galicia	0–5	Catalonia	Vilagarcia de Arousa
19:00		Report	Férez 5'; Putellas 9'; O. García 26', 37'; Llamas 68'	Stadium: A Lomba; Attendance: 4,500; Referee: Elena Casal

22 December 2017	Navarre	1–3	Catalonia	Pamplona
18:30	Oroz 19'	Report	Bonmatí 21'; Férez 61', 63'	Stadium: El Sadar; Referee: D.Recio Moreno

21 January 2019	Catalonia	0–0 (4–2 p)	Chile	L'Hospitalet de Llobregat
19:00		Report		Stadium: La Feixa Llarga; Attendance: 2,560; Referee: Ylenia Sánchez
	Penalties
	Torrodà (penalty scored); González (penalty scored); Pérez (penalty scored); Gutiérrez (penalty scored)		(penalty scored) Araya; (penalty missed) Soruco; (penalty scored) Aedo; (penalty missed) Huenteo

14 November 2022	Catalonia	v	Venezuela	Cancelled

7 April 2024 Friendly	Catalonia	5–1	Paraguay	Palamós
12:15	Aparicio 16'; Baudet 33'; Llompart 41'; Kanteh 51'; Losada 78'	Report	R. Fernández 50'	Stadium: Palamós Costa Brava; Attendance: 3,351; Referee: Cecilia Muñoz di Giovambattista (Spain)

1 June 2025 Friendly	Catalonia	2–3	Chile	Sant Joan Despí
19:00	Pablos 73', 80'	Report	Araya 32'; Keefe 37'; Balmaceda 53'	Stadium: Johan Cruyff Stadium; Attendance: 3,152; Referee: Ainara Acevedo Dudley

28 November 2026 Friendly	Catalonia	v	South Korea	Barcelona
12:00				Stadium: Camp Municipal Narcís Sala

== Players ==
=== Current squad ===
The following players were called up for the match against Chile on 1 June 2025.

Caps and goals as of 1 June 2025

Head coach: Xavi Llorens

No.	Pos.	Player	Date of birth (age)	Caps	Goals	Club
Goalkeepers
1	GK	Gemma Font	23 October 1999 (age 27)	2	0	(Catalonia) Barcelona
13	GK	Laura Coronado	6 April 2003 (age 23)	1	0	(Valencian Community) Levante UD
Defenders
2	DF	Judit Pujols	25 February 2005 (age 21)	1	0	(Germany) VfL Wolfsburg
5	DF	Mar Torras	6 April 1996 (age 30)	1	0	(Catalonia) Espanyol
8	DF	Marta Torrejón (c)	27 February 1990 (age 36)	4	0	(Catalonia) Barcelona
12	DF	Esther Laborde	20 April 2004 (age 22)	1	0	(Community of Madrid) Madrid CFF
18	DF	Júlia Guerra	23 January 2002 (age 24)	1	0	(Catalonia) Espanyol
19	DF	Núria Mendoza	15 December 1995 (age 30)	6	0	(Community of Madrid) Madrid CFF
Midfielders
3	MF	Paula Fernández	1 July 1999 (age 27)	1	0	(Basque Country (autonomous community)) Real Sociedad
4	MF	Alba Caño	30 September 2003 (age 23)	1	0	(Catalonia) Barcelona
6	MF	Vicky Losada (vc)	5 March 1991 (age 35)	4	1	(England) Bristol City
7	MF	Cristina Baudet	8 July 1991 (age 35)	4	1	(Catalonia) Espanyol
11	MF	Andrea Gómez	14 May 2003 (age 23)	1	0	(Andalusia) Granada
14	MF	María Llompart	19 October 2000 (age 26)	2	1	(Catalonia) Levante Badalona
15	MF	Aida Esteve	12 March 2001 (age 25)	1	0	(Valencian Community) Valencia
16	MF	María Pérez	24 December 2001 (age 24)	1	0	(England) London City Lionesses
21	MF	Judit Pablos	7 December 1997 (age 28)	2	2	(Catalonia) Espanyol
22	MF	Queralt Torradeflot	7 July 1997 (age 29)	2	0	(Switzerland) Rapperswil-Jona
Forwards
9	FW	Fatoumata Kanteh	8 May 1997 (age 29)	2	1	(Andalusia) Sevilla
10	FW	Irina Uribe	29 July 1998 (age 28)	2	0	(Catalonia) Levante Badalona
17	FW	Arola Aparicio	24 September 1997 (age 29)	2	1	(Basque Country (autonomous community)) Real Sociedad
20	FW	Bruna Vilamala	4 June 2002 (age 24)	1	0	(Mexico) Club América

=== Recent call-ups ===
The following players were named to a squad in the last years.

Pos.	Player	Date of birth (age)	Caps	Goals	Club	Latest call-up
GK	Esther Sullastres	20 March 1993 (age 33)	3	0	(Andalusia) Sevilla	v. Paraguay; 7 April 2024
GK	Noelia García	25 September 1992 (age 34)	1	0	(Canary Islands) Real Unión Tenerife	v. Chile; 21 January 2019
GK	María José Pons	8 August 1984 (age 42)	4	0	retired	v. Chile; 21 January 2019
DF	Emma Ramírez	10 May 2002 (age 24)	1	0	(Basque Country (autonomous community)) Real Sociedad	v. Paraguay; 7 April 2024
DF	Berta Bou	6 June 1999 (age 27)	1	0	(Italy) Parma Calcio	v. Paraguay; 7 April 2024
DF	Eva Llamas	29 May 1992 (age 34)	3	1	(Andalusia) Sevilla	v. Paraguay; 7 April 2024
DF	Leila Ouahabi	22 March 1993 (age 33)	4	0	(England) Manchester City	v. Paraguay; 7 April 2024
DF	Paola Soldevila	7 December 1996 (age 29)	5	0	(Japan) Nojima Stella Kanagawa	v. Paraguay; 7 April 2024
DF	Meritxell Martorell	15 October 2004 (age 22)	1	0	(Canary Islands) UD Tenerife	v. Paraguay; 7 April 2024
DF	Laia Aleixandri	25 August 2000 (age 26)	1	0	(England) Manchester City	v. Chile; 21 January 2019
DF	Ona Batlle	10 June 1999 (age 27)	1	0	(Catalonia) FC Barcelona	v. Chile; 21 January 2019
DF	Berta Pujadas	9 April 2000 (age 26)	2	0	(Catalonia) Levante Badalona	v. Chile; 21 January 2019
DF	María Estella del Valle	10 June 1994 (age 32)	5	0	(Canary Islands) UD Tenerife	v. Chile; 21 January 2019
MF	Zaira Flores	4 November 1993 (age 33)	1	0	retired	v. Paraguay; 7 April 2024
MF	Laura Martínez	29 January 1999 (age 27)	1	0	(Catalonia) Espanyol	v. Paraguay; 7 April 2024
MF	Débora García	17 October 1989 (age 37)	6	0	(Andalusia) Sevilla	v. Paraguay; 7 April 2024
MF	Georgina Carreras	9 June 1989 (age 37)	4	1	retired	v. Chile; 21 January 2019
MF	Laura Gutiérrez	2 May 1994 (age 32)	3	0	retired	v. Chile; 21 January 2019
MF	Brenda Pérez	26 June 1993 (age 33)	3	0	(Portugal) Sporting CP	v. Chile; 21 January 2019
MF	Anna Torrodà	21 January 2000 (age 26)	1	0	(Catalonia) Espanyol	v. Chile; 21 January 2019
FW	Carolina Férez	26 June 1991 (age 35)	5	3	(Andalusia) Betis	v. Chile; 21 January 2019
FW	Olga García	1 June 1992 (age 34)	3	3	retired	v. Chile; 21 January 2019
FW	María González	8 January 1998 (age 28)	1	0	(Catalonia) CE Europa	v. Chile; 21 January 2019

== Coaching staff ==
=== Manager history ===
As of 31 December 2025

Manager	From	To	Record							
Manager	From	To	G	W	D	L	GF	GA	GD	Win %
Félix Gimeno	2007		1	1	0	0	6	1	+5	100%
Natàlia Arroyo	2014	2019	5	2	3	0	10	3	+7	70%
Xavier Llorens	2024	current	2	1	0	1	7	4	+3	50%

== Records ==
Caps and goals as of 1 June 2025.
Players in bold are still active, at least at club level.

=== Most caps ===
#	Player	Career	Caps
1	**Débora García**	2014–	6
1	**Núria Mendoza**	2014–	6
3	**María Estella**	2014–	5
3	**Carolina Férez**	2014–2019	5
5	Laura Ràfols	2014–2017	4
5	**Leila Ouahabi**	2014–	4
5	**Paola Soldevila**	2014–	4
5	Marta Corredera	2014–2017	4
5	**Marta Torrejón**	2014–	4
5	**Vicky Losada**	2014–	4
5	**Cristina Baudet**	2016–	4

=== Most goals ===
#	Player	Career	Goals	Caps
1	Olga García	2014–2019	3	3
1	**Carolina Férez**	2014–2019	3	5
3	Judit Pablos	2024–	2	2
4	**Arola Aparicio**	2024–	1	1
4	**Fatou Kanteh**	2024–	1	1
4	**Eva Llamas**	2024–	1	1
4	**Maria Llompart**	2024–	1	1
4	**Aitana Bonmatí**	2016–2017	1	2
4	Marta Corredera	2014–2017	1	3
4	**Alexia Putellas**	2014–2016	1	3
4	**Cristina Baudet**	2016–	1	4
4	**Vicky Losada**	2014–	1	4

== Notable players ==
Catalan players who have represented FIFA-recognised international teams:

- Susanna Alsina
- Candela Andújar
- Lucía Arcos
- Carmen Arias
- Esther Arribas
- Laia Ballesté
- Kautar Azraf
- Ester Banqué
- Ona Batlle
- Montserrat Bonachera
- Aitana Bonmatí
- Raquel Cabezón
- Purificación Cano
- Laia Codina
- Judith Corominas
- Marta Corredera
- Marta Cubí
- Miriam Diéguez
- Susana Durá
- Juani Escamilla
- Ana María Escribano
- Carolina Férez
- Jana Fernández
- Martina Fernández
- Paulina Ferré
- Débora García
- Olga García
- Soledad García
- Salomé Giménez
- Montserrat Guimerà
- Emily Ibáñez
- Aurora Jordán
- Fatou Kanteh
- Margarita López
- Vicky Losada
- Silvia Mariano
- Ainhoa Marín
- Chola Moreno
- Lydia Muruzabal
- Paula Nicart
- Leila Ouahabi
- Sakina Ouzraoui
- Ángeles Parejo
- Isabel Parejo
- Judith Pascual
- Joana Perales
- Andrea Pereira
- Paqui Piedra
- Clàudia Pina
- María José Pons
- Cristina Prieto
- Francina Pubill
- Vicenta Pubill
- Montserrat Puig-Pey
- Berta Pujadas
- Kenty Pulido
- Alexia Putellas
- María Pérez
- Kenti Robles
- Silvia Roca
- Núria Sala
- Montserrat Salvà
- Elisabeth Sánchez
- Sheila Sanchón
- Roser Serra
- Clara Serrajordi
- Melanie Serrano
- Sagrario Serrano
- Esther Sullastres
- Laura Tarín
- Esther Torner
- Marina Torras
- Marta Torrejón
- Anna Torrodà
- Sandra Vilanova
- Fatima Zohra

Barcelona (64)	Girona (9)	Lleida	Rosselló	Tarragona (3)	Alghero

== See also ==
- Catalonia men's national football team
