= Malaska =

Malaska is a surname. Notable people with the surname include:

- Mark Malaska (born 1978), American baseball player
- Sanna Malaska (born 1983), Finnish footballer and coach
