= Laura Folch =

Spanish footballer (born 1990)

Personal information
- Full name: Laura Folch Tello
- Date of birth: 21 April 1990 (age 36)
- Place of birth: Zaragoza, Spain
- Position: Midfielder

Senior career*
Years	Team	Apps	(Gls)
2004–2014	Prainsa Zaragoza		
2014–2016	Santa Teresa	22	(0)
2017–2018	FF Zaragoza		
2018–2019	Aragonesa B		
- * Club domestic league appearances and goals

Laura Folch Tello (born 21 April 1990) is a Spanish former footballer who played as a midfielder.

== Career ==
She was described as one of Prainsa Zaragoza's most important players in the late 2000s. She represented the club in the 2009 Copa de la Reina de Fútbol against Espanyol, which Espanyol won.
