= Donaire =

Donaire is a surname. Notable persons with that name include:

- Glenn Donaire (born 1979), Filipino-American boxer
- Goretti Donaire (born 1982), Spanish footballer
- Nonito Donaire (born 1982), Filipino-American boxer, brother of Glenn
