= Pilar Neira =

Spanish footballer (born 1963)

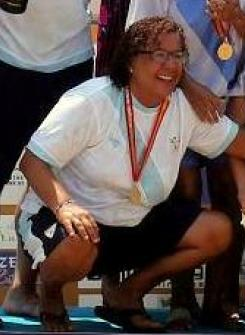
- Neira in 2013

Personal information
- Full name: Pilar Neira Martínez
- Date of birth: 2 June 1963 (age 63)

Senior career*
Years	Team	Apps	(Gls)
- Karbo

International career
- Galicia women's national team

Managerial career
- 2007–2008: Galicia women's national team
- * Club domestic league appearances and goals

Pilar Neira is a Spanish football coach and former player who coaches the Galicia women's national team.

As a player, Neira won two Spanish championships as part of Karbo C.F. in 1976–77 and 1981–82. As a member of that team, she also took part in two Five Nations tournaments. She worked in children's schools for over 40 years, first as an educator and later as a director. She also trained 11 indoor football teams. She joined the Galicia women's national team as coach in 2007, becoming one of the first four women to become a coach in Spain.

Neira has been outspoken about the issue of sexism in Spanish football.
