= Paola Soldevila =

Spanish footballer (born 1996)

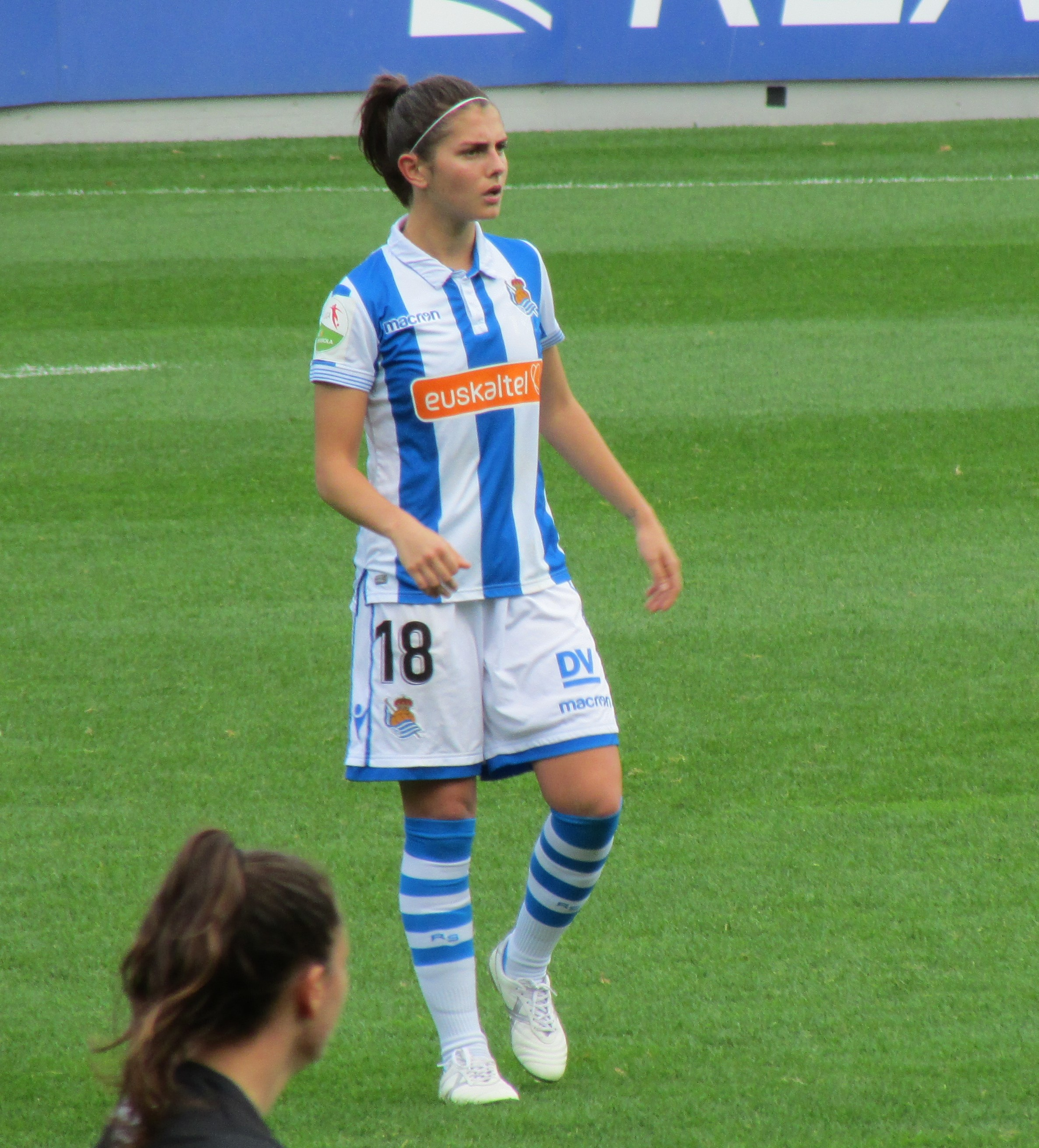

Personal information
- Full name: Paola Soldevila de la Pisa
- Date of birth: 7 December 1996 (age 29)
- Place of birth: Porrera, Spain
- Height: 1.66 m (5 ft 5 in)
- Position: Defender

Team information
- Current team: Nojima Stella Kanagawa
- Number: 6

Youth career
- 2011–2012: Reus

Senior career*
Years	Team	Apps	(Gls)
2012–2013	Nàstic		
2013–2014	Sant Gabriel B		
2014–2015	Sant Gabriel	25	(2)
2015–2019	Real Sociedad	89	(2)
2019–2021	Espanyol	53	(1)
2021–2024	Villarreal	89	(1)
2024–2025	INAC Kobe Leonessa	15	(0)
2025–	Nojima Stella Kanagawa		

International career^{‡}
	Catalonia	5	(0)
- * Club domestic league appearances and goals as of 07:03, 23 March 2025 (UTC) ‡ National team caps and goals as of 01:10, 4 April 2026 (UTC)

Paola Soldevila de la Pisa (born 7 December 1996) is a Spanish footballer who plays as a defender for WE League club Nojima Stella Kanagawa and the Catalonia national team.

== Club career ==
Soldevila started her career at Reus' academy. She played alongside boys at this stage of her career. Soldevila made her Primera División debut at the age of 17 while playing for Sant Gabriel.

== Personal life ==
Soldevila's grandfather, Jaume, her father, Ramón, and her brother, Albert, have all had football careers themselves.
