= Patricia Carballo =

Spanish footballer (born 1996)

Personal information
- Full name: Patricia Carballo Penas
- Date of birth: February 16, 1996 (age 30)
- Place of birth: A Coruña, Spain
- Height: 5 ft 7 in (1.70 m)
- Position: Forward

College career
Years	Team	Apps	(Gls)
2018	Georgia Southern Eagles	0	(0)

Senior career*
Years	Team	Apps	(Gls)
2019–2020	CD Tacón	17	(0)
- * Club domestic league appearances and goals

Patricia Carballo Penas (born 16 February 1996) is a Spanish footballer who is last known to have played as a striker for Real Madrid.

== Early life ==
Carballo was born in 1996 in A Coruña, Spain. As a youth footballer, she played for boys teams. Besides football, Carballo competed in athletics, including sprinting.

== College career ==
Carballo played for the women's team at Georgia Southern University in the United States.

== Club career ==
Carballo started her career with Spanish side Orzan. In 2015, she signed for Spanish side Atlético Madrid. At the age of twenty-seven, she retired from professional football.

== International career ==
Carballo played for the Galicia women's national football team.

== Style of play ==
Carballo was known for her speed. She was also known for being two-footed.
