= Marta Moreno =

Spanish footballer (born 1982)

Personal information
- Full name: Marta Moreno Remírez
- Date of birth: 18 December 1982 (age 43)
- Place of birth: Pamplona, Spain
- Height: 1.66 m (5 ft 5 in)
- Position: Defender

Senior career*
Years	Team	Apps	(Gls)
1996–2004	SD Lagunak		
2004–2012	Athletic Bilbao	171	(1)

International career
2000	Spain U19		
2000–2006	Spain	20	(0)
2007	Basque Country	1	(0)
- * Club domestic league appearances and goals

Marta Moreno Remírez is a retired Spanish football defender, whose last club was Athletic Bilbao in Spain's Primera División.

She was a member of the Spanish national team. In her senior career, she had played for the SD Lagunak club for eight years, before going on to play for another eight for Athletic Bilbao.

== Honours ==
Athletic Bilbao

- Superliga Femenina: 2004–05, 2006–07

Lagunak

- Primera Nacional (second tier): 2002–03
