= Lisbon Women's Cup =

The Lisbon Women's Cup is a women's football international invitational summer tournament held in Lisbon. It's organized by CF Benfica, which created it in 2015 after winning its first national championship.

== 2015 edition ==
It was contested on May 23–24 by four clubs, including two 2015-16 Champions League teams. In addition to Portuguese champion CF Benfica, the contestants were:

- Atlético Madrid, runner-up of the Spanish league.
- CD Transportes Alcaine from Zaragoza, 13th in the 2014-15 Spanish league.
- PSV/FC Eindhoven, 5th in the 2014–15 BeNe League.

Transportes Alcaine won the trophy on penalties in a Spanish final.

Semifinals
(Portugal) CF Benfica	1
(Spain) Atlético Madrid	2
(Netherlands) PSV/FC Eindhoven	1
(Spain) Transportes Alcaine	5

Final
(Spain) Atlético Madrid	1
(Spain) Transportes Alcaine (PSO)	1
3rd place
(Portugal) CF Benfica	0
(Netherlands) PSV/FC Eindhoven (PSO)	0
