= Fatou Kanteh =

Gambian footballer (born 1997)

Personal information
- Full name: Fatoumata Kanteh
- Birth name: Fatoumata Kanteh i Cham (Note: In this Catalan name, the first or paternal surname is Kanteh and the second or maternal family name is Cham; both are generally joined by the conjunction "i".)
- Date of birth: 2 July 1997 (age 29)
- Place of birth: Banyoles, Spain
- Height: 1.68 m (5 ft 6 in)
- Positions: Midfielder; forward

Team information
- Current team: Sevilla

Senior career*
Years	Team	Apps	(Gls)
2013–2017	Porqueres		
2018–2019	Logroño B		
2018–2019	Logroño	17	(1)
2019–2022	Sporting Huelva	80	(9)
2022–2024	Villarreal	58	(6)
2024–	Sevilla	1	(2)

International career^{‡}
2021–	Gambia	1	(1)
2024–	Catalonia	2	(1)
- * Club domestic league appearances and goals as of 10 August 2024 ‡ National team caps and goals as of 25 October 2022

Fatoumata Kanteh i Cham (born 8 May 1997), also known as Fatou, is a professional footballer who plays as a midfielder or forward for Liga F club Sevilla. Born in Spain, she represents The Gambia at international level. She also plays for the unaffiliated Catalonia national team.

== Club career ==
Kanteh has played for UE Porqueres, EdF Logroño and Sporting Huelva in Spain. She appeared in the professional 2021–22 Primera División for the latter.

== International career ==
Born in Spain, Kanteh is of Gambian and Senegalese descent. On 25 October 2021, she made her senior debut for Gambia. On 9 February 2022, she was called up by Gambia for the 2022 Africa Women Cup of Nations qualification (second round).
