= 1974 P.F. Barcelona season =

Peña Femenina Barcelona
1974 season
- Chairman: Agustí Montal Costa
- Manager: T. Huguet
- Stadium: Sardenya
- Campeonato Nacional de Fútbol Femenino: 4th–6th

Barcelona played in the first national women's football league in Spain in 1974, though not much of Spain was represented (out of the eight teams, five were from Catalonia, two were from Valencia, and one was from Aragon). The league was controlled by Educación y Descanso, and the prize was the Radio Miramar Trophy; the same organisation had held a tournament to compete for a Radio Miramar-sponsored trophy in 1972, and so the 1974 league – the Campeonato Nacional de Fútbol Femenino – was sometimes referred to as the II Trofeo Radio Miramar. The league was again played in two splits; a change was that each half was played for 35 minutes, rather than the 30 minutes they previously were in women's football.

The manager was T. Huguet, and the team often played at Sardenya, the ground of CE Europa. Barcelona had a women's futsal team by June 1974.

Ahead of their last two, postponed, matchdays in June 1974, Barcelona had 9 points and was sixth in the league. By this point, Marcol had played and won all of its matches to finish first.

== Players ==
Nat.	Name	Age	Since	Goals
(Catalonia)	Lolita Ortiz		1970	30+
(Catalonia)	Minguez		1970	
(Catalonia)	Pilar		1970	
(Catalonia)	Nuri		1971	8+
(Catalonia)	Armella		1971	
(Catalonia)	Montse		1971	1+
(Catalonia)	Neus Gallofré		1971	5+
(Catalonia)	María Teresa			
(Catalonia)	Pili			
(Catalonia)	Bosch			
(Catalonia)	Juani			
(Catalonia)	Satur			

- Source: Match reports

== Matches ==
=== Friendly ===
20 January 1974 Friendly	R.C.D. Español	v	Barcelona P.F.C. de F.	Barcelona
12:00		Report		Stadium: Campo C.D. Europa

March 1974 Friendly	C.D. Español	1–3	Barcelona P.F.C.F.	Artesa de Segre
	Peque	Report	Nuri 15'; Lolita 30', 60'

=== League ===
17 February 1974 1	Industria Taxi	4–0	Fútbol Club Barcelona	Barcelona
	Montse (pen.); Caridad; Cano	,		Stadium: La Verneda

24 February 1974 2	Barcelona	2–4	Manises	Barcelona
	Lolita	,	Agustina; Tere; Vicenta	Stadium: Sardenya

3 March 1974 3	Zaragoza	0–2	Barcelona	Zaragoza
		Report	Gallofré; Montse

10 March 1974 4	Barcelona	0–3	Marcol	Barcelona
16:45		,	Cruz; Carbó	Stadium: Sardenya

16 March 1974	Barcelona	0–0	Espanyol	Barcelona
17:00				Stadium: Sardenya
Note: Described as a game that was equal and exciting from start to finish, without either team able to produce a goal.

24 March 1974	U.D. Vich	1–2	Barcelona	Vic
16:00	Encarna 33'		Nuri 15', 25'

31 March 1974	P.F. Barcelona	1–0	Sabadell	Sant Sadurní d'Anoia
12:00	Gallofré 25'	,		Stadium: Campo Municipal San Sadurní de Noya

21 April 1974	Barcelona	1–2	S.D.C Taxi	Vic
	Nuria 2'	Report	Jordán; Cari

28 April/1 May 1974	Manises	2–0	Barcelona
		Report

11 May 1974	Marcol	2–0	Barcelona	Valencia
		Report

19 May 1974	Espanyol	1–1	Barcelona	Vilanova i la Geltrú
12:00		, ,		Stadium: Campo Vilanova

23 May 1974	Barcelona	2–2	Vich	Mataró
12:00		,		Stadium: Campo Municipal de Mataró

9 June 1974	Barcelona	v	Zaragoza	Sant Sadurní d'Anoia
17:30		Report		Stadium: Campo Municipal San Sadurní de Noya
Note: Postponed; originally scheduled for 4/5 May 1974.

16 June 1974	Sabadell	v	Barcelona	Lepanto
12:00		Report
