= Noelia García =

Spanish footballer (born 1992)

Personal information
- Full name: Noelia García Domenech
- Date of birth: 25 September 1992 (age 34)
- Place of birth: Igualada, Spain
- Position: Goalkeeper

Team information
- Current team: Real Unión de Tenerife
- Number: 1

Senior career*
Years	Team	Apps	(Gls)
2012–2019	Igualada		
2019–2020	AEM Lleida	21	(0)
2020–2025	Eibar	22	(0)
2025–	Real Unión de Tenerife		

International career
2019–	Catalonia	1	(0)
- * Club domestic league appearances and goals as of 13:39, 28 May 2022 (UTC)

Noelia García Domenech (born 25 September 1992) is a Spanish footballer who plays as a goalkeeper for Real Unión de Tenerife.

== Club career ==
García started her career at Igualada.
