= Hellen Mubanga =

Zambian footballer (born 1995)

Personal information
- Date of birth: 23 May 1995 (age 31)
- Place of birth: Lusaka, Zambia
- Height: 1.55 m (5 ft 1 in)
- Position: Forward

Team information
- Current team: Zaragoza CFF
- Number: 10

Youth career
- Bauleni Sports Academy

Senior career*
Years	Team	Apps	(Gls)
20??–2020	Red Arrows		
2020–	Zaragoza CFF	14	(0)

International career^{‡}
2014–	Zambia	8	(0)
- * Club domestic league appearances and goals as of 7 November 2021 ‡ National team caps and goals as of 11 october 2014 (before the 2014 African Women's Championship)

Hellen Mubanga (born 23 May 1995) is a Zambian footballer who plays as a forward for Spanish Primera Federación club Zaragoza CFF and the Zambia women's national team.

== Club career ==
Mubanga played for Bauleni Sports Academy and Red Arrows in Zambia and for Zaragoza CFF in Spain.

== International career ==
Mubanga was part of the team at the 2014 African Women's Championship, the 2018 Africa Women Cup of Nations, and the 2023 FIFA Women's World Cup.
