= María Llompart =

Spanish footballer (born 2000)

Personal information
- Full name: María Llompart Pons
- Date of birth: 19 October 2000 (age 26)
- Place of birth: Begues, Spain
- Height: 1.61 m (5 ft 3 in)
- Position: Midfielder

Team information
- Current team: Villarreal
- Number: 12

Youth career
- 2014–2016: Barcelona

Senior career*
Years	Team	Apps	(Gls)
2016–2017	Espanyol B		
2017–2019	Espanyol	28	(1)
2019–2020	Levante Las Planas		
2020–2022	Eibar	54	(3)
2022–	Villarreal	40	(4)

International career^{‡}
2018	Spain U19	4	(1)
2021–2022	Spain U23	7	(0)
2024–	Catalonia	2	(1)
Medal record
Representing Spain
UEFA Women's Under-19 Championship
First place	2018 Switzerland
- * Club domestic league appearances and goals as of 02:26, 23 December 2023 (UTC) ‡ National team caps and goals as of 02:26, 23 December 2023 (UTC)

María Llompart Pons (born 19 October 2000) is a Spanish professional footballer who plays as a midfielder for Liga F club Villarreal CF.

== Club career ==
Llompart started her career at Barcelona's academy.
