= 1979–80 P.F. Barcelona season =

Peña Femenina Barcelona
1979–80 season
- Chairman: Josep Lluís Núñez
- Campeonato Femenino: 2nd (Note: Barcelona was second on 19 January 1980 and after this did not lose a game, while holding direct competitors to goalless draws.)

The 1979–80 season was the ninth year and sixth season in existence of P.F. Barcelona. They played in the Campeonato Femenino, Catalan league.

The league was operated by Deporte Laboral, part of Educación y Descanso, which had organised the women's leagues between 1972 and 1974. The Spanish Football Federation had refused to recognise women's football when requested by P.F. Barcelona and the Catalan Football Federation, leaving the formal organisation of competition down to clubs and the workers' leisure organisation of Deporte Laboral.

Unusually, FC Barcelona had two women's teams – in 1979 there were only six formalised teams in Catalonia. On the initiative of Josep Lluís Núñez, who had become FC Barcelona president in 1978, the women's teams received a comparably high level of support and were both able to train and play at the club's main facilities.

== Matches ==
=== Friendlies ===
| June 1979 Friendly | F.C. Barcelona | v | Karbo | Barcelona |
| | | Report |
Note: Held after Karbo took part in a European competition as Spanish representatives

=== League ===
| 3 November 1979 or before | v |

| 10 November 1979 | C.D. Español | 1–1 | P.F. Barcelona |
| | | Report |

| 17 November 1979 | F.F. Sabadell | 2–3 | P.F. Barcelona |
| | | Report |

| 24 November 1979 | F.F. Barcelona | 8–0 | C.F. Medina |
| | | Report |
Note: After the match, Barcelona were on 7 points with 4 matches played. It was at least the sixth matchday.

| 2 December 1979 | F.F. Cat. | 3–0 | P.F. Barcelona |
| | | Report |

| 8 December 1979 | Besós | 0–10 | Barcelona |
| | | Report |

| 16 December 1979 | Citat Condal | 0–2 | F.F. Barcelona |
| | | Report |

| 13 January 1980 | Aguilar Verdes | 0–1 | C.F. Barcel. |
| | | Report |

| before 19 January 1980 | v |

| 20 January 1980 | P. F. Barcelona | suspended | C. D. Español |
| | | Report |
Note: At this point, Barcelona was second in the league with 15 points, having played nine matches.

| 27 January 1980 | P.F. Barna | 0–0 | F.F. Sabadell |
| | | Report |

| 3 February 1980 | C.F. Mediona | 0–3 | P.F. Barcelona |
| | | Report |

| 10 February 1980 | P.F. Barcelona | 0–0 | F.F. Cataluña |
| | | Report |
