= Georgina Carreras =

Spanish footballer (born 1989)

Personal information
- Full name: Georgina Carreras Caner
- Date of birth: 9 June 1989 (age 37)
- Place of birth: Begur, Spain
- Height: 1.65 m (5 ft 5 in)
- Position: Midfielder

Youth career
- 2004–2007: L'Estartit

Senior career*
| Years | Team | Apps | (Gls) |
| 2007–2008 | L'Estartit | | |
| 2008–2009 | Atlético Madrid | | |
| 2009–2011 | L'Estartit | | |
| 2011–2013 | Sant Gabriel | | |
| 2013–2020 | Valencia | 122 | (8) |
| 2020–2022 | PSV | 24 | (0) |

International career
| 2006–2007 | Spain U-19 | | |
| 2007–2019 | Catalonia | 4 | (1) |
- * Club domestic league appearances and goals as of 5 May 2019

Georgina 'Gio' Carreras Caner (born 9 June 1989) is a Spanish footballer who plays as a midfielder. She previously played for UE L'Estartit, Atlético Madrid and CE Sant Gabriel.

She was an Under-19 international.

== Personal life ==
Carreras is in a relationship with Dutch footballer Mandy van den Berg.
