= Débora García =

Spanish footballer (born 1989)

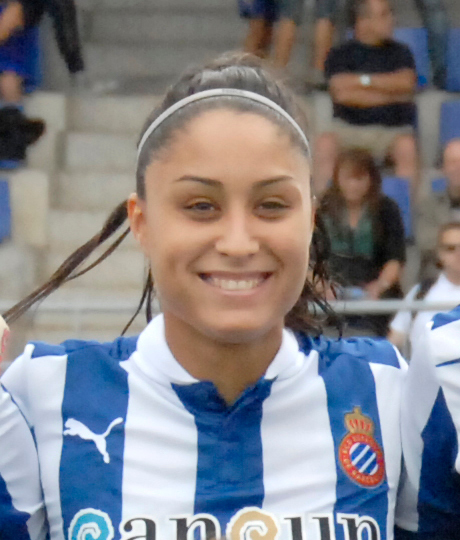
- With Espanyol in 2012

Personal information
- Full name: Débora García Mateo
- Date of birth: 17 October 1989 (age 37)
- Place of birth: Santa Coloma de Gramenet, Spain
- Height: 1.67 m (5 ft 6 in)
- Position: Midfielder

Team information
- Current team: Valencia

Youth career
- 2002–2008: Espanyol

Senior career*
Years	Team	Apps	(Gls)
2008–2010	UE L'Estartit		
2010–2014	Espanyol		
2014–2016	Atlético Madrid	51	(1)
2016–2019	Valencia	64	(4)
2019–2021	Espanyol	50	(2)
2021–2026	Sevilla	137	(2)
2026–	Valencia	0	(0)

International career
2012–2013?	Spain	3	(0)
2014–	Catalonia	6	(0)
- * Club domestic league appearances and goals as of 6 May 2020

Débora García Mateo (born 17 October 1989), commonly known as Débora, is a Spanish footballer who plays as a midfielder for Primera División club Valencia. In October 2012 she made her debut for the Spain national team at Glasgow's Hampden Park against Scotland in the 2013 European Championship's qualifying play-offs.

== Club career ==
Débora progressed from RCD Espanyol's youth teams and won two Copa de la Reinas and one league title with the Catalan club. In 2014, she transferred to Atlético Madrid. She won the 2016 Copa de la Reina with Atlético, then signed for Valencia the following month. She returned to Espanyol in 2019.
