= Sanna Malaska =

Finnish footballer and coach (born 1983)

Personal information
- Full name: Sanna Irene Malaska
- Date of birth: 6 April 1983 (age 43)
- Place of birth: Helsinki, Finland
- Height: 1.71 m (5 ft 7 1/2 in)
- Positions: Defender; midfielder

Youth career
- 1989–1992: To Te
- 1993–2000: HJK

Senior career*
| Years | Team | Apps | (Gls) |
| 2000–2003 | HJK | | |
| 2004 | Sunnanå SK | | |
| 2007 | Prainsa Zaragoza | | |
| 2008–2010 | Amazon Grimstad | | (2) |
| 2011 | HJK | 25 | (4) |

International career
| 2004–2010 | Finland | 37 | (2) |
- * Club domestic league appearances and goals

Sanna Irene Malaska (born 6 April 1983) is a Finnish football coach and former midfielder, currently running the female youth teams at HJK Helsinki of the Naisten Liiga. As well as for HJK, she has played for Sunnanå SK of Sweden's Damallsvenskan, Prainsa Zaragoza in the Spanish Superleague and Amazon Grimstad in Norway's Toppserien.

She has been a member of the Finnish national team, taking part in the 2005 and 2009 European Championships. She last appeared in 2010.
