= Joana Montouto =

Spanish footballer (born 1990)

Personal information
- Full name: Joana Montouto Escudeiro
- Date of birth: 5 May 1990 (age 36)
- Place of birth: Vigo, Spain
- Height: 1.60 m (5 ft 3 in)
- Position: Striker

Senior career*
Years	Team	Apps	(Gls)
2004–2007	El Olivo		
2007–2008	Zaragoza		
2008–2010	RCD Espanyol	49	(6)
2010–2012	El Olivo		
2012–2015	Sárdoma		
2015–2016	El Olivo		
2016–2018	Sárdoma		
2018–2019	Boavista	17	(1)
2019–2020	Sárdoma		
2020–	Mos		
- * Club domestic league appearances and goals as of 11:16, 7 September 2021 (UTC)

Joana Montouto Escudeiro (born 5 May 1990) is a Spanish footballer who has played as a striker for El Olivo, Zaragoza and Espanyol in Spain's Primera División.

== Career ==
On 1 August 2007, Montouto's transfer from El Olivo to Primera División club Zaragoza was announced. The previous season, she had already rejected an offer to sign for Levante. Following her spell at Zaragoza, she would spend two seasons at Espanyol. In November 2011, after having returned to El Olivo at this point, Montouto announced her temporary retirement from the sport, citing a lack of desire and motivation. By 2018, Montouto had had three separate periods at El Olivo and two periods with Sárdoma. In that same year, she transferred to Boavista, who were playing in the Campeonato Nacional Feminino, the top tier of Portuguese football. She made 17 league appearances and scored one goal during her one season there. Montouto described that season with Boavista as the lowest point of her career. After leaving Boavista, she joined Sárdoma again for another season before transferring to UD Mos.

She has been called up to the under-19 squad for Spain. Montouto also plays futsal competitively.

== Honours ==
- Copa de la Reina: 2009, 2010
