= 1973 P.F. Barcelona season =

Peña Femenina Barcelona
1973 season
- Chairman: Agustí Montal Costa
- Stadium: La Verneda; Estadio Municipal Sagnier
- Campeonato Copa Primavera: 1st

The Barcelona women's football team played its second season of organised football in 1973, in the Catalonia-based league Copa Primavera, which it won.

== Summary ==
After the first Catalan women's football league in 1971, the Francoist organisation Educación y Descanso took over to organise Catalan tournaments in 1972, in which Penya Femenina Barcelona did not participate. These tournaments were cancelled in March 1973, with Educación y Descanso starting the second edition of its spring season (copa primavera) shortly thereafter, in April 1973, with Barcelona taking part.

Barcelona had still played in 1972, with Pubill being called up to the representative Spanish team in October 1972.

Ahead of the 1973 season, Barcelona advertised trials for the squad, organised by Nuri, in Mundo Deportivo from at least January 1973.

A great surprise came on matchday 6 of the spring season when Sabadell, who had lost the previous five games and were bottom of the league, defeated Barcelona 3–0. Barcelona had been unbeaten at the top of the league; after matchday 7, the result was annulled and the points were awarded to Barcelona, with Sabadell penalised for having fielded multiple unregistered players in the match.

Two of the games hosted by Industria del Taxi, against Barcelona and Espanyol, had to be postponed for Taxi's pitch to be disinfected after hosting a horse show. These were rescheduled after the last natural matchday; at the end of the spring season, Barcelona and Espanyol were both tied in first place on 21 points, and so the results of both teams' yet-to-be-played matches against Taxi would decide the victor. Barcelona won the league.

== Players ==
Nat.	Name	Age	Since	Goals
(Catalonia)	Lolita Ortiz		1970	28+
(Spain)	Vicenta Pubill		1971	23+
(Catalonia)	Nuri		1971	11+
(Catalonia)	Neus Gallofré		1971	3+
(Catalonia)	Echus			1+
(Catalonia)	María Jesús			1+
(Catalonia)	Pepis			1+

- Source: Match reports

== Matches ==
=== Spring season ===
The Copa Primavera began on 8 April 1973.

8 April 1973 1	C. de F. Martorelles	0–4	Barcelona C.F.	Martorelles
12:15		,	Pubill; Nuria	Stadium: Campo Municipal de Martorellas

14 April 1973 2	Barcelona	3–1	Industria del Taxi	El Prat
18:00		,		Stadium: Estadio Municipal Sagnier

29 April 1973 3	Barcelona	1–1	Espanyol	El Prat
17:00		,		Stadium: Estadio Municipal Sagnier

1 May 1973 4	Comarcal Vich	0–1	C.F. Barcelona	Roda de Ter
15:30		,		Stadium: Estadio Municipal de Roda de Ter

5 May 1973 5	Barcelona	3–1	Badalona	El Prat
17:00	Gallofré; Pubill	,	Paqui	Stadium: Estadio Municipal Sagnier

12 May 1973 6	Sabadell	Void; ~~(3–0)~~	Barcelona	Sabadell
17:30	~~Celi~~; ~~Dolors~~	, ,		Stadium: La Riereta
Note: Originally a Sabadell victory, the result was annulled and victory awarded to Barcelona due to improper alignment by Sabadell.

19 May 1973 7	Barcelona	1–1	SEAT	El Prat
17:00	Lolita	,	Montse	Stadium: Estadio Municipal Sagnier

27 May 1973 8	Barcelona	2–0	Martorelles	El Prat
	Pubill; Pepis	Report		Stadium: Estadio Municipal Sagnier

9 June 1973	Barcelona	4–1	Vich	Barcelona
16:30	Nuri; María Jesús	,	Caracuel	Stadium: La Verneda

16 June 1973	Espanyol	1–2	Barcelona	Barcelona
18:45	Montse	,	Nuri	Stadium: La Verneda

23 June 1973	X X	1–1	Barcelona
		,	Nuri

30 June 1973	Barcelona	2–1	Sabadell	Barcelona
18:00	Lolita; Echus 55' (pen.)	,	Montse 5'	Stadium: La Verneda

7 July 1973	SEAT	2–1	Barcelona	Campo de la SEAT
18:30	Nuri; Matilde	,	Gallofré

18 July 1973 9	Industria Taxi	v	C.F. Barcelona	Barcelona
19:00		Report		Stadium: Camp de fútbol municipal Iberia
Note: Originally scheduled for 12:00 midday on 3 June at Camp de Iberia, the match was suspended as the pitch needed to be disinfected after hosting a horse show. Both teams arrived to the match so that the referee could officially give a no-fault suspension.
