= Carolina Miranda (footballer) =

Spanish footballer and manager (born 1982)

Carol Miranda
Personal information
- Full name: Carolina Miranda Calleja
- Date of birth: 8 April 1982 (age 44)
- Place of birth: Pamplona, Spain
- Height: 1.64 m (5 ft 5 in)
- Position: Midfielder

Senior career*
Years	Team	Apps	(Gls)
1996–2002	Lagunak		
2002–2005	Sabadell		
2005–2009	Espanyol		
2009–2013	Sant Gabriel		
2013–2016	Levante Las Planas		
2016–2018	Seagull		

Managerial career
- 2019: Valencia (women, caretaker)
- 2020: Valencia (women, caretaker)
- * Club domestic league appearances and goals

Carolina Miranda Calleja, better known as Carol Miranda, is a retired Spanish football midfielder and the current manager of the women's team of Valencia CF.

== Playing career ==
Miranda played for SD Lagunak, CE Sabadell, RCD Espanyol and several Catalan teams in the Spanish Primera División.

== Managerial career ==
On 15 April 2019, Miranda was appointed as head coach of women's Valencia, where she was assistant coach until the sack of Óscar Suárez.

After her first experience as head coach, she remained in the club as director of football. She came back to the bench of Valencia on 2 February 2020, as caretaker coach after the dismissal of Irene Ferreras. She only managed the team in the 2–7 Copa de la Reina loss against Deportivo La Coruña.

== Titles ==
- 1 Spanish League (2006)
- 3 Spanish Cups (2003, 2006, 2009)
