= SD Lagunak (women) =

Spanish women's football team

- Full name: Sociedad Deportiva Lagunak
- Nickname: Amarillas
- Founded: 1990
- Ground: Servicio Municipal Lagunak; Barañain, Navarre, Spain
- Capacity: 1,000
- Chairman: Ignacio Nieto
- Manager: Rubén Berrogui
- League: Regional Leagues
- 2016-17: 2nd (Navarrese Group)
Home colours	Away colours

SD Lagunak women's team is a Spanish football club that represents SD Lagunak in women's football. Based in Barañain in Navarre (just south-west of Pamplona), they formerly played in the top-tier league and currently play in the Navarrese group in the fourth-tier Regional Leagues. Founded in 1990, Lagunak was the first women's football team in Navarre. The club has been more successful than its male counterpart, having been a runner-up both in the national championship and the national cup, where it reached the final three times between 1998 and 2006.

== History ==
The first success of SD Lagunak was reaching the 1998 Copa de la Reina final after beating defending champion RCD Espanyol in the semi-finals. They lost 4–0 to Atlético Málaga, who also won the league that season. Two years later they again reached the final, but were beaten by Levante UD.

When the Spanish league was unified in 2001 Lagunak started in Primera Nacional, the second category. It reached the Superliga in 2003 after topping its group and beating FC Barcelona and Atlético Jiennense in the promotion play-offs.

In 2006 it qualified for the Copa de la Reina for the first time in the Superliga era following Estudiantes Huelva's relegation. Lagunak defeated CF Puebla and Rayo Vallecano to reach its third final. This time the result was a tie (2-2), but Lagunak lost in the penalty shootout. In the 2006–07 season, Lagunak ended second to last and was relegated. The next year Lagunak won the Group A and beat Atlético Málaga and CD Arguineguín to regain its spot in the premier category.

In its return to top flight Lagunak ended in the mid-to-bottom part of the table. A three-group, two-stage reform of the top tier was carried out in 2009; Lagunak didn't make it into the 8-team championship group, but qualified for the expanded 2011 Copa de la Reina, where they were defeated by Athletic Bilbao by an 11-1 aggregate. With the return to the former competition system in the 2011–12 season managed to avoid relegation one more year before suffering two relegations in a row. The team has since played in the Navarrese Regional League, improving its results every year.

== Former internationals ==
- Spain: Paz Azagra, Ane Bergara, Marta Moreno, Ainhoa Tirapu, Erika Vázquez.

== Season to season ==
Season	Division	Place	Copa de la Reina
1991–92	2 (Gr. A)	4th	
1992–93	2 (Gr. 4)		Round of 16
1993–94	2 (Gr. A)		
1994–95	2 (Gr. A)		
1995–96	2 (Gr. A)		
1996–97	2 (Gr. 1)	5th	
1997–98	2 (Gr. 1)		Runner-up
1998–99	2 (Gr. 1)	9th	
1999–00	1	3rd	Runner-up
2000–01	1	2nd	Semifinals
2001–02	2 (Gr. 1)	3rd	
2002–03	2 (Gr. 1)	1st	
2003–04	1	7th	
2004–05	1	11th	
2005–06	1	9th	Runner-up

Season	Division	Place	Copa de la Reina
2006–07	1	13th	
2007–08	2 (Gr. 1)	1st	
2008–09	1	11th	
2009–10	1	15th	
2010–11	1	13th	First round
2011–12	1	14th	
2012–13	1	16th	
2013–14	2 (Gr. 2)	14th	
2014–15	Regional	7th	
2015–16	Regional	5th	
2016–17	Regional	2nd	
2017–18	Regional	2nd	
