= Goretti Donaire =

Spanish footballer (born 1982)

Personal information
- Full name: Goretti Donaire Patón
- Date of birth: 17 August 1982 (age 44)
- Place of birth: Barcelona, Spain
- Height: 1.63 m (5 ft 4 in)
- Position: Striker

Senior career*
| Years | Team | Apps | (Gls) |
| 1999–2001 | Barcelona | | |
| 2001–2005 | Espanyol | | |
| 2005–2006 | Barcelona | | (6) |
| 2006–2009 | Levante | 76 | (41) |
| 2009–2011 | L'Estartit | 44 | (14) |
- * Club domestic league appearances and goals as of 13:24, 27 July 2021 (UTC)

Goretti Donaire Patón (born 17 August 1982), often known as Goretti, is a Spanish former footballer who played as a midfielder or forward. Throughout her career she played in Spain's Superliga Femenina for Espanyol, Barcelona, Levante and L'Estartit, winning one league title with Levante.

== Career ==
Goretti's career started with Barcelona in the 1999–2000 season. Later in her career, with Levante, Goretti won the 2006–07 Superliga title. In September 2011, it was announced that Goretti had left L'Estartit and retired from football. For L'Estartit, Goretti scored 14 goals in 44 appearances.

== Personal life ==
In an interview with Marca in 2010, Goretti announced that she was working on examinations to join Mossos d'Esquadra, the Catalan police force. In the same interview, she explained that this was because top-level Spanish female footballers struggle to earn enough money to live on playing football alone. In 2017, she was one of 52 current and former Barcelona players inducted into the Barça Players Association, aimed at recognising the most significant female footballers in Barcelona's history.
