= 2006–07 Superliga Femenina =

Superliga
- Season: 2006–07
- Champions: Athletic Bilbao (4th title)
- Relegated: Lagunak; Barcelona
- UEFA Women's Cup: Athletic Bilbao
- Matches: 182
- Goals: 634 (3.48 per match)

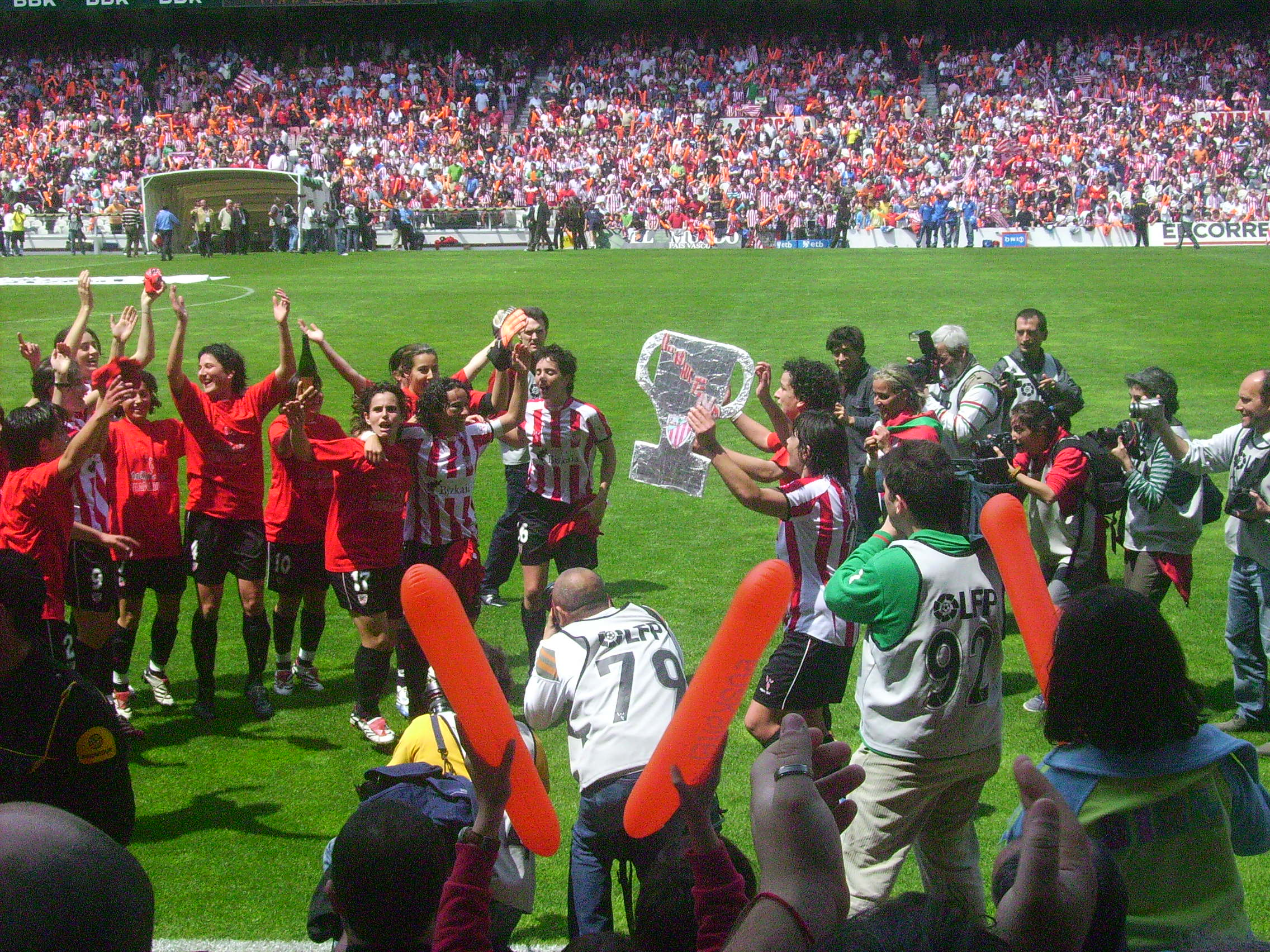
Athletic Bilbao Women’s Football Team 2006-2007 League Champions

The 2006–07 Superliga season will be the 19th since its establishment.

== Teams and locations ==
Team	Location
Athletic Bilbao	Bilbao
Atlético Madrid	Madrid
Barcelona	Barcelona
Espanyol	Barcelona
Híspalis (Note: Híspalis signed a collaboration agreement with Sevilla FC and started to play with their name and their colors.)	Seville
Lagunak	Barañáin
Levante	Valencia
Oviedo Moderno	Oviedo
Puebla	Puebla de la Calzada
Rayo Vallecano	Madrid
Real Sociedad	San Sebastián
Sporting Huelva	Huelva
Torrejón	Torrejón de Ardoz
Transportes Alcaine	Zaragoza

== League table ==
Pos	Team	Pld	W	D	L	GF	GA	GD	Pts	Relegation
1	Athletic Bilbao (C)	26	20	4	2	82	27	+55	64	Qualification to UEFA Women's Cup and Copa de la Reina
2	Espanyol	26	20	3	3	87	30	+57	63	Qualification to Copa de la Reina
3	Levante	26	16	7	3	76	25	+51	55	Qualification to Copa de la Reina
4	Rayo Vallecano	26	16	5	5	61	41	+20	53	Qualification to Copa de la Reina
5	Híspalis	26	13	6	7	58	35	+23	45	Qualification to Copa de la Reina
6	Torrejón	26	11	4	11	42	39	+3	37	Qualification to Copa de la Reina
7	Puebla	26	10	5	11	34	45	−11	35	Qualification to Copa de la Reina
8	Atlético Madrid	26	8	7	11	31	46	−15	31	Qualification to Copa de la Reina
9	Real Sociedad	26	7	6	13	31	51	−20	27	
10	Sporting Huelva	26	5	9	12	28	57	−29	24	
11	Oviedo Moderno	26	5	7	14	29	58	−29	22	
12	Transportes Alcaine	26	5	5	16	20	50	−30	20	
13	Lagunak (R)	26	4	4	18	29	72	−43	16	Relegation to Liga Nacional
14	Barcelona (R)	26	4	4	18	26	58	−32	16	Relegation to Liga Nacional

Source: Soccerway
Rules for classification: 1) Points; 2) Head-to-head points; 3) Head-to-head goal difference; 4) Goal difference; 5) Goals scored.
(C) Champions; (R) Relegated

== Results ==
Home \ Away	ATH	ATM	BAR	ESP	HIS	LAG	LEV	OVI	PUE	RAY	RSO	SPH	TOR	ALC
Athletic Bilbao	—	5–1	5–0	4–1	3–0	3–0	1–0	7–0	5–2	4–0	3–0	4–1	0–0	3–1
Atlético Madrid	1–2	—	0–1	2–2	0–0	2–1	1–4	1–1	4–3	1–2	2–1	3–1	1–3	1–0
Barcelona	2–3	0–1	—	1–7	1–3	0–2	0–2	4–2	1–2	1–1	1–3	2–1	0–3	1–1
Espanyol	1–1	3–0	5–1	—	3–2	4–0	3–2	2–0	4–1	3–5	4–0	3–0	6–1	7–0
Híspalis	2–4	2–2	5–2	1–2	—	6–1	2–0	3–0	3–2	2–1	3–0	7–0	2–1	3–1
Lagunak	0–1	0–3	1–1	1–3	2–2	—	1–6	2–0	2–0	0–2	2–3	1–2	1–2	1–0
Levante	3–1	5–0	1–0	1–0	2–1	13–2	—	2–2	2–2	1–1	2–0	5–0	3–2	6–0
Oviedo Moderno	2–2	1–1	0–0	1–5	2–0	5–4	0–3	—	0–1	2–2	2–0	3–0	1–1	1–1
Puebla	0–3	0–0	3–2	0–3	0–0	1–0	1–1	1–0	—	0–4	2–0	4–2	2–1	2–0
Rayo Vallecano	2–1	1–0	1–3	1–1	3–3	5–2	0–5	7–2	3–1	—	3–1	4–1	2–4	3–1
Real Sociedad	1–6	2–2	2–1	0–3	0–3	6–2	1–1	2–0	1–1	0–2	—	2–2	1–1	2–0
Sporting Huelva	1–1	1–1	2–1	2–6	1–1	1–1	2–2	4–0	2–1	0–1	1–1	—	0–2	0–0
Torrejón	5–7	5–1	1–0	0–1	0–1	1–0	1–1	2–1	1–2	1–3	2–0	0–1	—	1–2
Transportes Alcaine	2–3	0–1	1–0	2–5	2–1	0–0	1–3	2–1	1–0	1–2	0–1	1–1	0–1	—

Source: Arquero Arba
Legend: Blue = home team win; Yellow = draw; Red = away team win.

== See also ==
- 2007 Copa de la Reina de Fútbol
