= Raquel Cabezón =

Spanish footballer (born 1978)

Personal information
- Full name: Raquel Cabezón Muñoz
- Date of birth: 15 September 1978 (age 48)
- Place of birth: Barcelona, Spain
- Height: 1.71 m (5 ft 7 in)
- Position: Midfielder

Senior career*
| Years | Team | Apps | (Gls) |
| 1994–2005 | Espanyol | | |
| 2005–2006 | Barcelona | | |
| 2006–2007 | Espanyol | | |
| 2007–2008 | Levante | | |

International career
| 1998–2007 | Spain | 38 | (6) |
- * Club domestic league appearances and goals

Raquel Cabezón Muñoz is a former Spanish football midfielder. She played for RCD Espanyol, FC Barcelona and Levante in Spain's Superliga Femenina.

She was a member of the Spanish national team.

International goals

- 1999 FIFA Women's World Cup play-off
  - 1 in Spain 4–1 Scotland (1998)
- 2001 Euro play-off
  - 1 in Denmark 4–2 Spain (2000)
- Torneo de Maspalomas
  - 1 in Spain 2–2 Finland (2002)
- 2007 WC Q
  - 1 in Finland 0–1 Spain (2005)
  - 1 in Spain 3–2 Belgium (2005)
  - 1 in Spain 7–0 Poland (2006)

== Titles ==
- 1 Spanish League (2008)
- 2 Spanish Cups (1996, 1997)
