= Sara Serna =

Spanish footballer (born 1987)

Personal information
- Full name: Sara Serna Abadías
- Date of birth: 28 October 1987 (age 39)
- Place of birth: Sabadell, Spain
- Height: 1.77 m (5 ft 10 in)
- Position: Striker

Team information
- Current team: Seagull

Senior career*
Years	Team	Apps	(Gls)
2004–2009	Espanyol		
2009–2011	L'Estartit		
2011–2012	Espanyol		
2012–2013	Girona		
2013–2016	Levante Las Planas		
2016–2019	Seagull		
2019–2021	Sant Gabriel		
2021–2022	Cornellà		
2022–	Seagull		

International career
2005–2006	Spain U19		
2007–2015	Catalonia	2	(2)
- * Club domestic league appearances and goals

Sara Serna Abadías is a Spanish football striker currently playing in Segunda División for CE Seagull. She previously played for RCD Espanyol, with whom she also played the 2006-07 European Cup, UE L'Estartit and Levante Las Planas.

She has been an U-19 international.
