= Zaragoza CFF =

Spanish football club

- Full name: Zaragoza Club de Fútbol Femenino
- Founded: 2002; 24 years ago
- Ground: Nuevo Estadio Enrique Porta, Villanueva de Gállego, Zaragoza
- Capacity: 3,500
- Chairman: Carmelo Alcaine
- Manager: Nacho Bracero
- League: Segunda División Pro
- 2019–20: Segunda División, 8th (Group North)
- Website: http://zaragozacff.es/
Home colours	Away colours

Zaragoza Club de Fútbol Femenino, formerly known as Club Deportivo Transportes Alcaine for sponsorship reasons, is a Spanish women's football team from Zaragoza playing in Segunda Federación.

== History ==
Logo used until 2017.

Zaragoza CFF was founded in 2002 after carrier company Transportes Alcaine bought Inter Aragón, which played in the lower categories. In 2005 the new team promoted to Superliga Femenina, the Spanish top league. After Grupo Prainsa became the main sponsor in 2007 and renamed the club as Prainsa Zaragoza, the main team consolidated itself in the first half of the table.

In 2009 the club performed their best season to date, ending 5th and playing the 2009 Copa de la Reina final. In the Cup competition, Alcaine lost to Espanyol.

Transportes Alcaine repeated success in 2013 by reaching their second Cup final. As in the previous final, the club was defeated by a four-goal margin, this time 0–4 against FC Barcelona.

On 26 September 2016 the club changed its name to Zaragoza Club de Fútbol Femenino.

== Season by season ==
Name	Season	Tier	Division	Position	
Name	Season	Tier	Division	League	Cup
Transportes Alcaine	2002–03	2	Primera Nacional (Gr. A)	7th	
Transportes Alcaine	2003–04	2	Primera Nacional (Gr. A)	4th	
Transportes Alcaine	2004–05	2	Primera Nacional (Gr. A)	1st	
Transportes Alcaine	2005–06	1	Superliga	12th	
Transportes Alcaine	2006–07	1	Superliga	12th	
Prainsa Zaragoza	2007–08	1	Superliga	8th	Semifinals
Prainsa Zaragoza	2008–09	1	Superliga	5th	Runner-up
Prainsa Zaragoza	2009–10	1	Superliga	6th	Quarterfinals
Prainsa Zaragoza	2010–11	1	Superliga	6th	Quarterfinals
Prainsa Zaragoza	2011–12	1	Primera División	9th	
Prainsa Zaragoza	2012–13	1	Primera División	7th	Runner-up
Transportes Alcaine	2013–14	1	Primera División	12th	
Transportes Alcaine	2014–15	1	Primera División	13th	
Transportes Alcaine	2015–16	1	Primera División	12th	
Zaragoza CFF	2016–17	1	Primera División	12th	
Zaragoza CFF	2017–18	1	Primera División	15th	
Zaragoza CFF	2018–19	2	Segunda División (Gr. 3)	1st (Note: Along with the other Segunda División regional winners, the team took part in the playoffs to the Primera División but did not qualify; instead they moved to the new Primera División B but remained in the second tier of the system due to its creation.)	
Zaragoza CFF	2019–20	2	Segunda División Pro (North)	8th	
Zaragoza CFF	2020–21	2	Segunda División Pro (North)	10th	
Zaragoza CFF	2021–22	2	Segunda División Pro (North)	9th	
Zaragoza CFF	2022–23	3	Segunda Federación (North)	7th	
Zaragoza CFF	2023–24	3	Segunda Federación (North)	5th	

== Titles ==
=== Invitational ===
- Lisbon Cup (1): 2015

== Players ==
=== Current squad ===
As of 15 April 2023

Note: Flags indicate national team as defined under FIFA eligibility rules; some limited exceptions apply. Players may hold more than one non-FIFA nationality.

No.	Pos.	Nation	Player
1	GK	ESP	Elena Casao
3	DF	ESP	Cris Beltrán
4	DF	ESP	Marta Valero
7	MF	USA	Lauren Curtin
8	MF	ESP	Teresa Rey
11	MF	ESP	Judith Sainz
14	DF	ESP	Sara Balma

No.	Pos.	Nation	Player
15	DF	ESP	Lucía Fuertes
16	MF	VEN	Michelle Romero
17	MF	ESP	Marta Hernández
18	MF	ZAM	Hellen Mubanga
20	FW	ZAM	Racheal Nachula
—	MF	ESP	Claudia Santillán

=== Reserve team ===
Note: Flags indicate national team as defined under FIFA eligibility rules; some limited exceptions apply. Players may hold more than one non-FIFA nationality.

No.	Pos.	Nation	Player
22	DF	ESP	Sara Fernández
23	DF	ESP	Leire García
24	DF	ESP	Leyre Valdivia
27	MF	ESP	Luna González

No.	Pos.	Nation	Player
31	FW	ESP	Daniela Cañada
32	FW	ESP	María Muñoz
33	GK	ESP	Marta Alonso

=== Former internationals ===
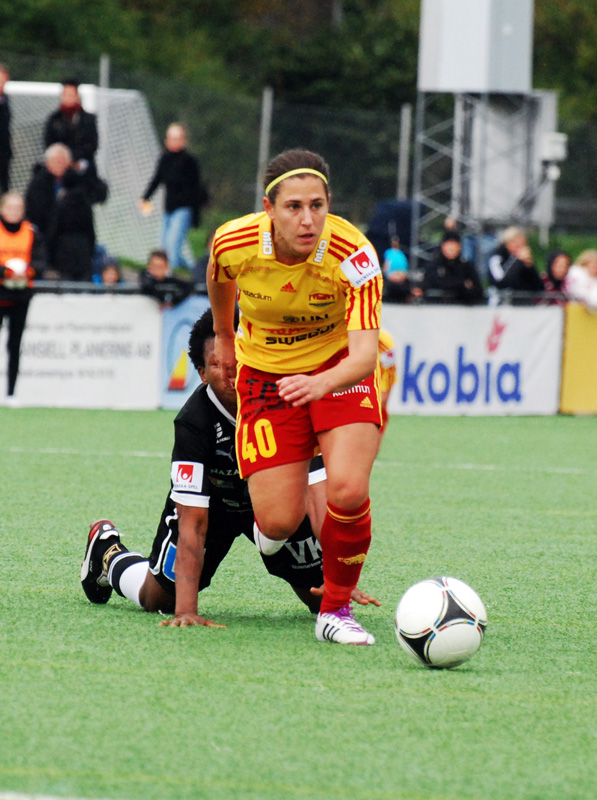
Alcaine was 2011 WPS MVP Verónica Boquete's first team in the top tier

- Spain: Vero Boquete, Silvia Meseguer, Sara Monforte, Mapi León, Marta Cardona, Esther Sullastres
- Argentina: Mariela Coronel, Clarisa Huber
- Austria: Annelie Leitner
- Brazil: Andréia Suntaque, Darlene de Souza, Mayara Bordin
- Chile: Su Helen Galaz, Bárbara Santibáñez, Rocío Soto
- Colombia: Natalia Gaitán, Oriánica Velásquez
- Finland: Sanna Malaska
- Greece: Ioanna Chamalidou, Anastasia Spyridonidou
- Mexico: Mely Solís
- Montenegro: Armisa Kuč
- Morocco: Hanane Aït
- Namibia: Zenatha Coleman
- Nigeria: Peace Efih
- Norway: Maren Johansen
- Paraguay: Gloria Villamayor
- Peru: Claudia Cagnina
- Portugal: Ana Borges, Edite Fernandes, Jamila Marreiros, Sónia Matias, Cláudia Neto, Emily Lima
- Romania: Olivia Oprea
- Senegal: Korka Fall, Mamy Ndiaye
- Switzerland: Veronica Maglia
- United States: Lydia Hastings
- Zambia: Racheal Nachula, Hellen Mubanga
- Venezuela: Lisbeth Castro
