= 2014–15 FC Barcelona Femení season =

Barcelona Femení
2014–15 season
- Head coach: Xavi Llorens
- Home ground: Ciutat Esportiva Joan Gamper
- Superliga: 1st
- Copa de la Reina: Semifinals
- Copa Catalunya: Winners
- UEFA Champions League: Round of 16
- Top goalscorer: League: Sonia Bermúdez (22); All: Sonia Bermúdez (24)
- Biggest win: Home: Barcelona 8–0 Fundación Albacete; Barcelona 8–0 Sevilla; Away: Four teams 0–4 Barcelona
- Biggest defeat: Home: Barcelona 1–2 Valencia; Away: Valencia 2–1 Barcelona
Home colours

The 2014–15 season was the 27th season in the history of FC Barcelona Femení.

== Players ==
=== First team ===
Pos.	Nat.	Name	Age	Since	App.	Goals
Goalkeepers
GK	(Spain)	Laura Ràfols (co-captain)	24	2007		0
GK	(England)	Chelsea Ashurst	25	2013	13	0
Defenders
DF	(Spain)	Melanie Serrano	25	2003		
DF	(Spain)	Marta Unzué (co-captain)	26	2006		
DF	(Spain)	Míriam Diéguez	29	2011		
DF	(Spain)	Marta Torrejón	25	2013	81	5
DF	(Spain)	Ruth García	27	2013	78	7
DF	(Spain)	Núria Garrote	17	2013	22	1
DF	(Spain)	Leire Landa	28	2014	15	0
Midfielders
MF	(Spain)	Esther Romero	27	2006		
MF	(Spain)	Vicky Losada	24	2006		
MF	(Spain)	Gemma Gili	20	2012		
MF	(Spain)	Virginia Torrecilla	20	2012		
MF	(Spain)	Pilar Garrote	17	2013	4	3
MF	(Spain)	Cristina Baudet	23	2014	20	5
MF	(Spain)	Sandra Hernández	17	2014	12	3
Forwards
FW	(Spain)	Marta Corredera	23	2010		
FW	(Spain)	Sonia Bermúdez	30	2011		
FW	(Spain)	Alexia Putellas	21	2012		
FW	(Spain)	Willy	27	2013	47	17
FW	(Spain)	Jenni Hermoso	25	2013	46	18
FW	(Spain)	Andrea Falcón	18	2013	17	0
FW	(Spain)	Mariona Caldentey	19	2014	30	12

- Source: FCBarcelona.com
- Ordered by arrival.

== Transfers ==
=== In ===
Pos.	Nat.	Player	Moving from	Type	Source
Summer
MF	(Spain)	Cristina Baudet	Sant Gabriel	Transfer	
MF	(Spain)	Sandra Hernández	Sant Gabriel	Transfer	
DF	(Spain)	Leire Landa	Athletic Club	Transfer	
FW	(Spain)	Mariona Caldentey	Collerense	Transfer	

=== Out ===
Pos.	Nat.	Player	Moving to	Type	Source
Summer
DF	(Spain)	Laura Gómez	Retired		
MF	(Mexico)	Kenti Robles	Espanyol	Transfer	
MF	(Serbia)	Jelena Čanković	(Serbia) Spartak Subotica	Transfer	
MF	(Spain)	Carol Férez	Valencia	Transfer	
DF	(Spain)	Marta Turmo	Sant Gabriel	Transfer	
MF	(Spain)	Carola García	Sant Gabriel	Transfer	
GK	(Spain)	Alba Moreno	Santa Teresa	Transfer	
Winter
MF	(Spain)	Vicky Losada	(England) Arsenal	Transfer	

== Pre-season ==
=== COTIF Women's Football Tournament ===
In September 2014, Barcelona contested the COTIF Women's Football Tournament, a supercup format, for the first and only time – they also won it after defeating Valencia 3–0 in the semifinal and Levante 1–0 in the final. The semifinal was the only time in the 2014–15 season that Barcelona defeated Valencia and scored more than one goal against them.

September 2014 Semifinal	Valencia	0–3	Barcelona	Valencia
			Caldentey; N. Garrote; Putellas

19 September 2014 Final	Levante	0–1	Barcelona	Valencia
		Report	Hermoso 30'

== Competitions ==
=== Overall record ===
Competition	First match	Last match	Starting round	Final position	Record							
Competition	First match	Last match	Starting round	Final position	Pld	W	D	L	GF	GA	GD	Win %
Primera División	7 September 2014	2 May 2015	Matchday 1	Winners	30	25	2	3	93	9	+84	83.33
Copa de la Reina	10 May 2015	15 May 2015	Quarterfinals	Semifinals	2	1	0	1	4	1	+3	50.00
Copa Catalunya	29 August 2014	31 August 2014	Semifinals	Winners	2	2	0	0	13	1	+12	100.00
UEFA Women's Champions League	8 October 2014	13 November 2014	Round of 32	Round of 16	4	2	1	1	5	2	+3	50.00
Total					38	30	3	5	115	13	+102	78.95

Source: Competitions

=== Primera División ===
==== Results summary ====
Overall								Home						Away					
Pld	W	D	L	GF	GA	GD	Pts	W	D	L	GF	GA	GD	W	D	L	GF	GA	GD
30	25	2	3	93	9	+84	77	14	0	1	61	4	+57	11	2	2	32	5	+27

Source: Soccerway

==== Results by round ====
Round	1	2	3	4	5	6	7	8	9	10	11	12	13	14	15	16	17	18	19	20	21	22	23	24	25	26	27	28	29	30
Ground	H	A	H	A	H	A	H	A	H	A	H	A	H	H	A	A	H	A	H	A	H	A	H	A	H	A	H	A	A	H
Result	W	L	W	W	W	W	W	W	W	W	W	W	W	W	W	W	L	W	W	W	W	W	W	D	W	L	W	D	W	W
Position	6	8	5	5	5	4	3	2	2	1	1	1	1	1	1	1	1	1	1	1	1	1	1	1	1	1	1	1	1	1

Updated to match(es) played on 2 May 2015. Source: Soccerway
A = Away; H = Home; W = Win; D = Draw; L = Loss; P = Postponed

Qualified for 2015–16 UEFA Women's Champions League and 2015 Copa de la Reina
Qualified for 2015 Copa de la Reina

==== Matches ====
===== First split =====
7 September 2014 1	Barcelona	2–0	Collerense	Sant Joan Despí
11:00	Alexia 30'; Corredera 45'; Jenni (yellow card)	Report	Patri (yellow card)	Stadium: Pitch 1, Ciutat Esportiva Joan Gamper; Referee: Sanchéz Rico

20 September 2014 2	Valencia	2–1	Barcelona	Paterna
10:45	Monforte 45'; Carol 48' (yellow card) 90+1'	Report	Corredera 52'	Stadium: Municipal de Beniferri

28 September 2014 3	Barcelona	4–0	Santa Teresa	Sant Joan Despí
11:00	Corredera 17', 38'; Willy 53'; Sonia 54'	Report		Stadium: Pitch 1, Ciutat Esportiva Joan Gamper

4 October 2014 4	Sant Gabriel	0–3	Barcelona	Barcelona
16:30		Report	Vicky 18'; Sandra 80'; Mariona 82'	Stadium: Estadio Municipal José Luis Ruiz Casado; Referee: Carlos Rodríguez

12 October 2014 5	Barcelona	8–0	Albacete	Sant Joan Despí
11:00	Sonia 12', 27', 42'; Vicky 21'; Willy 77', 91'; Mariona 79'; Baudet 81'	Report		Stadium: Pitch 1, Ciutat Esportiva Joan Gamper

19 October 2014 6	Cajasol Sporting	0–4	Barcelona	Huelva
10:30		Report	Willy 6'; Sonia 34'; Jenni 78'; Torrejón 81'	Stadium: Campo Federativo de la Orden; Referee: Carlos Hidalgo Márquez

26 October 2014 13	Barcelona	5–1	Oviedo Moderno	Sant Joan Despí
11:00	Jenni 14', 47', 48'; Ruth 73'; Vicky 85' (pen.)	Report	Lucia 80'	Stadium: Pitch 1, Ciutat Esportiva Joan Gamper

1 November 2014 7	Barcelona	3–0	Levante	Sant Joan Despí
10:45	Vicky 59'; Gemma Gili 90' (yellow card); Willy 90+3'	Report	Alba (yellow card)	Stadium: Pitch 1, Ciutat Esportiva Joan Gamper; Referee: Óscar Sauleda Torrent

16 November 2014 9	Barcelona	1–0	Atlético Madrid	Sant Joan Despí
	Willy 23'; Melanie (yellow card) 70'	Report		Stadium: Pitch 1, Ciutat Esportiva Joan Gamper; Referee: Alejandro Fernández Pérez

22 November 2014 14	Barcelona	4–0	Transportes Alcaine	Sant Joan Despí
15:00	Corredera 6'; Clara 10' (o.g.); Jenni 31', 58'	Report		Stadium: Pitch 1, Ciutat Esportiva Joan Gamper

30 November 2014 10	Real Sociedad	0–2	Barcelona	Donostia-San Sebastián
11:30	Itziar (yellow card)	Report	Mariona 83', 93'; Virginia (yellow card)	Stadium: Instalaciones de Zubieta; Referee: Mosquiera Antón

6 December 2014 11	Barcelona	4–0	Athletic Club	Sant Joan Despí
11:45	Sonia 6', 55' (yellow card); Alexia 41'; Jenni 77'	Report	V. Gimbert (yellow card)	Stadium: Pitch 1, Ciutat Esportiva Joan Gamper; Referee: Raúl Calle Martínez

14 December 2014 12	Sevilla	0–3	Barcelona	Seville
11:00		Report	Alexia (red card) 35'; Vicky 56'; Sonia 69'; Torrejón 88'; Chelsea (yellow card)	Stadium: Estadio Jesús Navas; Referee: Miguel Fernández Delgado

20 December 2014 8	Rayo Vallecano	0–1	Barcelona	Madrid
15:00		Report	Torrejón 42'	Stadium: Pitch 5, Ciudad Deportiva Rayo Vallecano

10 January 2015 15	Espanyol	0–4	Barcelona	Sant Adrià de Besòs
10:45		Report	Sonia 9', 15'; Willy 14'; Unzué 62'; Ràfols (red card) 88'	Stadium: Ciutat Esportiva Dani Jarque; Referee: Pere Barceló Roca

===== Second split =====
18 January 2015 16	Collerense	0–1	Barcelona	Palma de Mallorca
10:30		Report	Mariona 88'	Stadium: Estadio Municipal Coll d'en Rebassa; Referee: Iván González González

24 January 2015 17	Barcelona	1–2	Valencia	Sant Joan Despí
10:45	Corredera 64'	Report	Mari Paz 71' (pen.); Carol 84'	Stadium: Pitch 1, Ciutat Esportiva Joan Gamper

1 February 2015 18	Santa Teresa	0–4	Barcelona	Badajoz
10:45		Report	Torrejón 6'; Vicky 31', 73'; Alexia 83'	Stadium: Ciudad Deportiva del Viejo Vivero

14 February 2015 19	Barcelona	5–0	Sant Gabriel	Sant Joan Despí
10:45	Alexia 33'; Sonia 59'; Jenni 72'; Willy 76'; Gemma 86'	Report		Stadium: Pitch 1, Ciutat Esportiva Joan Gamper

22 February 2015 20	Albacete	0–2	Barcelona	Albacete
11:00		Report	Corredera 3'; Sonia 27'	Stadium: Ciudad Deportiva Andrés Iniesta

1 March 2015 21	Barcelona	7–0	Cajasol Sporting	Sant Joan Despí
11:00	Ruth 10'; Sonia 21', 41'; Corredera 30', 63'; Willy 82', 87'	Report	Sandra (yellow card)	Stadium: Pitch 1, Ciutat Esportiva Joan Gamper; Referee: Jordi Molina Fernández
Note: A moment of silence was held before the match.

8 March 2015 22	Levante	1–2	Barcelona	Valencia
11:00	Alharilla 67'	Report	Ruth 8'; Mariona 59'	Stadium: Polideportivo Municipal de Nazaret; Referee: Julio Mena Giménez

15 March 2015 23	Barcelona	3–1	Rayo Vallecano	Sant Joan Despí
11:00	Melanie 11'; Mariona 13', 48'	Report	Jade 35' (pen.)	Stadium: Pitch 1, Ciutat Esportiva Joan Gamper; Referee: Vico Moreno

22 March 2015 24	Atlético Madrid	1–1	Barcelona	Majadahonda
09:00	Esther 11'	Report	Sonia 33'; Virginia (yellow card)	Stadium: Artificial Pitch, Estadio Cerro del Espino; Referee: Roberto Carralero

29 March 2015 25	Barcelona	3–0	Real Sociedad	Sant Joan Despí
11:00	Mariona 11'; Sonia 44'; Alexia 66'	Report		Stadium: Pitch 1, Ciutat Esportiva Joan Gamper

4 April 2015 26	Athletic Club	1–0	Barcelona	Lezama
11:45	Erika V. 90+5' (yellow card)	Report	Ruth (yellow card); Melanie (yellow card); Sonia (yellow card)	Stadium: Pitch 2, Instalaciones de Lezama; Referee: Pardo Saavedra

12 April 2015 27	Barcelona	8–0	Sevilla	Sant Joan Despí
11:00	Sonia 3', 27', 31', 90'; Corredera 15', 51'; Jenni 26'; Mariona 52'	Report		Stadium: Pitch 1, Ciutat Esportiva Joan Gamper

19 April 2015 28	Oviedo Moderno	0–0	Barcelona	Oviedo
11:00		Report		Stadium: Estadio Manuel Díaz Vega; Referee: Pablo Fernández Pérez

26 April 2015 29	Transportes Alcaine	0–4	Barcelona	Zaragoza
11:00		Report	Sonia 23'; Baudet 60', 84'; Sandra 76'	Stadium: Estadio Pedro Sancho

2 May 2015 30	Barcelona	3–0	Espanyol	Sant Joan Despí
10:45	Alexia 5'; Sonia 25'; Mariona 45'	Report		Stadium: Pitch 1, Ciutat Esportiva Joan Gamper

Source: Superliga

=== Copa de la Reina ===
Having won the league, defending champions Barcelona qualified for the Copa de la Reina in May 2015; the top eight teams in the league all entered the bracket in the quarterfinals. Barcelona advanced from their quarterfinal tie, before losing their semifinal 0–1.

10 May 2015 Quarter-final	Barcelona	4–0	Levante	Torrelodones
12:30 (CEST)	Bermúdez 22'; Caldentey 74'; Willy 80'; Hernández 82'	Report		Stadium: Estado Municipal Julián Ariza; Referee: Gil Gozalo

15 May 2015 Semi-final	Valencia	1–0	Barcelona	Melilla
18:00 (CEST)	Férez 37'	Report		Stadium: Estadio Municipal Álvarez Claro; Referee: Ibáñez Gutiérrez

=== Copa Catalunya ===
Barcelona contested the Copa Catalunya in August 2014, winning to achieve its fifth title.

29 August 2014 Semi-final	Barcelona	9–1	CE Europa	Sant Joan Despí
	A. Romero 4', 15', 43'; Gili 18', 75'; Putellas 48'; Baudet 58', 69'; P. Garrote 87'	Report	Kaky 39'	Stadium: Municipal de Les Planes; Referee: Victòria Petrova Borislavova

31 August 2014 Final	Barcelona	4–0	Espanyol	Sant Joan Despí
	Willy 28', 45'; Virginia 32'; Pilar 76'	Report		Stadium: Municipal de Les Planes; Referee: Ainara Acevedo Dudley

=== UEFA Women's Champions League ===
==== Knockout phase ====
Barcelona entered the 2014–15 Champions League directly in the Round of 32, winning their two-legged tie against Slavia Praha 4–0 on aggregate. They then played Bristol Academy in the Round of 16, losing 1–2 on aggregate.

8 October 2014 Round of 32, Leg 1	Slavia Praha (Czech Republic)	0–1	Barcelona	Prague
18:30		Report	García 82'	Stadium: Eden Arena; Attendance: 4,224; Referee: Kateryna Zora (Ukraine)

15 October 2014 Round of 32, Leg 2	Barcelona	3–0	(Czech Republic) Slavia Praha	Barcelona
19:00	Alexia 20'; Sonia 27'; Romero 57'	Report		Stadium: Mini Estadi; Attendance: 994; Referee: Sara Persson (Sweden)

8 November 2014 Round of 16, Leg 1	Barcelona	0–1	(England) Bristol Academy	Barcelona
19:00	Losada (yellow card) 43'; Romero (yellow card) 83'	Report	Corredera 26' (o.g.)	Stadium: Mini Estadi; Attendance: 870; Referee: Cristina Dorcioman (Romania)

13 November 2014 Round of 16, Leg 2	Bristol Academy (England)	1–1	Barcelona	Bristol
20:30	Watts 83' (pen.)	Report	Losada 40'; Torrejón (yellow card) 64'; Serrano (yellow card) 83'	Stadium: Ashton Gate Stadium; Attendance: 2,457; Referee: Anastasia Pustovoitova (Russia)

== Statistics ==
=== Overall ===
As of 15 May 2015

No..	Pos.	Nat.	Player	Primera División		Copa de la Reina		Copa Catalunya		Champions League		Total		Discipline		Notes
No..	Pos.	Nat.	Player	Apps	Goals	Apps	Goals	Apps	Goals	Apps	Goals	Apps	Goals	Yellow card	Red card	Notes
Goalkeepers
1	GK	(Spain)	Laura Ràfols	28	0	2	0	2	0	4	0	36	0	0	1	
13	GK	(England)	Chelsea Ashurst	2	0	0	0	0+1	0	0	0	3	0	1	0	Also wore 25
Defenders
2	DF	(Spain)	Marta Unzué	17+6	1	0	0	2	0	4	0	29	1	0	0	Also wore 15 and 4
3	DF	(Spain)	Marta Torrejón	30	4	2	0	2	0	4	0	38	4	1	0	Also wore 18
4	DF	(Spain)	Ruth García	28	3	2	0	2	0	4	1	36	4	1	0	Also wore 3
5	DF	(Spain)	Melanie Serrano	29	1	2	0	2	0	4	0	37	1	3	0	
8	DF	(Spain)	Míriam Diéguez	2+5	0	0+2	0	0	0	0	0	9	0	0	0	
12	DF	(Spain)	Núria Garrote	3+10	0	0	0	0+2	0	0+1	0	16	0	0	0	Also wore 2
2	DF	(Spain)	Leire Landa	12+1	0	2	0	0	0	0	0	15	0	0	0	
Midfielders
6	MF	(Spain)	Virginia Torrecilla	26+1	0	2	0	2	1	4	0	35	1	2	0	Also wore 21
8	MF	(Spain)	Gemma Gili	10+13	2	0+1	0	2	2	3+1	0	30	4	1	0	Also wore 14, 9 and 15
12	MF	(Spain)	Esther Romero	1+7	0	0	0	0+2	0	0	0	10	0	0	0	Also wore 14 and 6
14	MF	(Spain)	Vicky Losada	18+1	7	0	0	0	0	4	1	23	8	1	0	Also wore 8 and 9
16	MF	(Spain)	Sandra Hernández	1+7	2	0+1	1	0	0	0	0	9	3	0	0	Also wore 18 and 22
18	MF	(Spain)	Cristina Baudet	0+15	3	0	0	0+2	2	0	0	17	5	0	0	Also wore 16 and 20
12	MF	(Spain)	Pilar Garrote	1	0	0	0	0+2	2	0	0	3	2	0	0	Also wore 2
Forwards
7	FW	(Spain)	Marta Corredera	26+2	11	2	0	2	0	4	0	36	11	0	0	Also wore 16
9	FW	(Spain)	Jenni Hermoso	18+3	9	2	0	2	0	2+1	0	28	9	1	0	Also wore 11 and 19
10	FW	(Spain)	Alexia Putellas	24+2	6	2	0	2	1	3+1	1	34	8	0	1	Also wore 9, 17, 11 and 7
11	FW	(Spain)	Willy	16+14	10	0+2	1	2	5	1+2	1	37	17	1	0	Also wore 17, 18 and 9
15	FW	(Spain)	Mariona Caldentey	11+14	11	2	1	0	0	0+3	0	30	12	0	0	Also wore 17
17	FW	(Spain)	Sonia Bermúdez	27+1	22	2	1	0	0	3+1	1	34	24	2	0	Also wore 10
16	FW	(Spain)	Andrea Falcón	0+2	0	0	0	0+2	0	0	0	4	0	0	0	
Own goals (1)

=== Goalscorers ===
As of 15 May 2015

Rank	No.	Pos.	Nat.	Player	Primera División	Copa de la Reina	Copa Catalunya	Champions League	Total
1	17	FW	(Spain)	Sonia Bermúdez	22	1	—	1	24
2	11	FW	(Spain)	Willy	10	1	5	1	17
3	15	FW	(Spain)	Mariona Caldentey	11	1	—	—	12
4	7	FW	(Spain)	Marta Corredera	11	—	—	—	11
5	9	FW	(Spain)	Jenni Hermoso	9	—	—	—	9
6	14	MF	(Spain)	Vicky Losada	7	—	—	1	8
6	10	FW	(Spain)	Alexia Putellas	6	—	1	1	8
8	18	MF	(Spain)	Cristina Baudet	3	—	2	—	5
9	3	DF	(Spain)	Marta Torrejón	4	—	—	—	4
9	4	DF	(Spain)	Ruth García	3	—	—	1	4
9	8	MF	(Spain)	Gemma Gili	2	—	2	—	4
12	16	MF	(Spain)	Sandra Hernández	2	1	—	—	3
13	12	MF	(Spain)	Pilar Garrote	—	—	2	—	2
14	2	DF	(Spain)	Marta Unzué	1	—	—	—	1
14	5	DF	(Spain)	Melanie Serrano	1	—	—	—	1
14	6	MF	(Spain)	Virginia Torrecilla	—	—	1	—	1
Own goals (from the opponents)					1	—	—	—	1
Totals					93	4	13	5	115

=== Cleansheets ===
As of 15 May 2015

Rank	No.	Nat.	Player	Primera División	Copa de la Reina	Copa Catalunya	Champions League	Total
1	1	(Spain)	Laura Ràfols	21	1	1	2	25
2	13	(England)	Chelsea Ashurst	2	—	—	—	2
—	16	(Spain)	Andrea Falcón	*	—	—	—	*
Totals				23	1	1	2	27

=== Disciplinary record ===
As of 15 May 2015

No.	Pos.	Nat.	Player	Primera División			Copa de la Reina			Copa Catalunya			Champions League			Total		
No.	Pos.	Nat.	Player	Yellow card	(yellow card) (yellow-red card)	Red card	Yellow card	(yellow card) (yellow-red card)	Red card	Yellow card	(yellow card) (yellow-red card)	Red card	Yellow card	(yellow card) (yellow-red card)	Red card	Yellow card	(yellow card) (yellow-red card)	Red card
10	FW	(Spain)	Alexia Putellas			1												1
1	GK	(Spain)	Laura Ràfols			1												1
5	DF	(Spain)	Melanie Serrano	2									1			3		
17	FW	(Spain)	Sonia Bermúdez	2												2		
6	MF	(Spain)	Virginia Torrecilla	2												2		
9	FW	(Spain)	Jenni Hermoso	1												1		
4	DF	(Spain)	Ruth García	1												1		
8	MF	(Spain)	Gemma Gili	1												1		
13	GK	(England)	Chelsea Ashurst	1												1		
14	MF	(Spain)	Vicky Losada										1			1		
11	FW	(Spain)	Willy										1			1		
3	DF	(Spain)	Marta Torrejón										1			1		
Totals				10		2							4			14		2

Source: FCBarcelona.com
Ordered by (red card) , (second yellow card) and (yellow card)
(yellow card) = Number of bookings; (second yellow card) = Number of sending offs after a second yellow card; (red card) = Number of sending offs by a direct red card.
