= 2013–14 FC Barcelona Femení season =

Barcelona Femení
2013–14 season
- Primera División: 1st
- Copa de la Reina: Winners
- Copa Catalunya: Runners-up
- UEFA Champions League: Quarterfinals
- Biggest win: Home: Barcelona 10–0 Granada; Away: Real Sociedad 0–5 Barcelona
Home colours	Away colours	Third colours

The 2013–14 season was the 26th season in the history of FC Barcelona Femení. They won the league and Copa de la Reina, lost the final of the Copa Catalunya 3–4 in a penalty shoot-out, and made it to the quarter-finals of the Champions League. On 9 March 2014, Sonia Bermúdez scored the fastest women's hat-trick in history against FC Levante Las Planas in the league, netting her goals in a span of about three minutes.

== Players ==
=== First team ===
No.	Pos.	Nat.	Name	Age	Since	App.	Goals
Goalkeepers
1	GK	(Spain)	Laura Ràfols	23	2007		0
13	GK	(England)	Chelsea Ashurst	24	2013	10	0
Defenders
5	DF	(Spain)	Melanie Serrano	24	2003		
2	DF	(Spain)	Marta Unzué (captain)	25	2006		
15	DF	(Spain)	Laura Gómez	31	2008		
3	DF	(Spain)	Marta Torrejón	24	2013	43	1
4	DF	(Spain)	Ruth García	27	2013	42	3
Midfielders
14	MF	(Spain)	Esther Romero	26	2006		
9	MF	(Spain)	Vicky Losada (captain)	23	2006		
8	MF	(Spain)	Míriam Diéguez	28	2011		
16	MF	(Spain)	Gemma Gili	20	2012	60	4
6	MF	(Spain)	Virginia Torrecilla	19	2012	79	7
17	MF	(Spain)	Cristina Baudet	22	2014	3	0
	MF	(Spain)	Sandra Hernández	17	2014	3	0
Forwards
7	FW	(Spain)	Carolina Férez	22	2009		
7	FW	(Spain)	Marta Corredera	22	2010		
10	FW	(Spain)	Sonia Bermúdez	29	2011		
17	FW	(Mexico)	Kenti Robles	23	2011		
11	FW	(Spain)	Alexia Putellas	20	2012	82	25
9	FW	(Spain)	Willy	27	2013	10	0
22	FW	(Serbia)	Jelena Čanković	18	2013	24	7
11	FW	(Spain)	Jenni Hermoso	24	2013	18	9

- Last updated: 21 June 2014
- Source: FCBarcelona.com
- Ordered by arrival.

=== Reserve team ===
As of 21 August 2013

Note: Flags indicate national team as defined under FIFA eligibility rules; some limited exceptions apply. Players may hold more than one non-FIFA nationality.

No.	Pos.	Nation	Player
—	FW	ESP	Carla Puiggròs
12	DF	ESP	Núria Garrote
—	MF	ESP	Pilar Garrote
18	FW	ESP	Andrea Falcón
—	MF	ESP	Carola García
25	GK	ESP	Alba Moreno

== Transfers ==
=== In ===
No.	Pos.	Nat.	Player	Moving from	Source
Summer 2013
4	DF	(Spain)	Ruth García	Levante	
14	MF	(Spain)	Esther Romero	Sant Gabriel	
13	GK	(England)	Chelsea Ashurst	Sporting de Huelva	
9	FW	(Spain)	Ana Romero (Willy)	Espanyol	
3	DF	(Spain)	Marta Torrejón	Espanyol	
22	FW	(Serbia)	Jelena Čanković	(Serbia) Spartak Subotica	
Winter 2013/14
11	FW	(Spain)	Jenni Hermoso	(Sweden) Tyresö FF	
Summer 2014
17	MF	(Spain)	Cristina Baudet	Sant Gabriel	(Note: Baudet and Hernández were signed in May 2014, and able to participate in Barcelona's post-season competitions prior to the 2014–15 season.)
	MF	(Spain)	Sandra Hernández	Sant Gabriel	(Note: Baudet and Hernández were signed in May 2014, and able to participate in Barcelona's post-season competitions prior to the 2014–15 season.)

=== Out ===
No.	Pos.	Nat.	Player	Moving to	Source
Summer 2013
	GK	(Spain)	Esther Sullastres	Transportes Alcaine	
	GK	(Spain)	María Ripoll	Levante Las Planas	
	DF	(Spain)	María Ramos	Levante Las Planas	
	DF	(Spain)	Ani Escribano	(Iceland) ÍBV	
	DF	(Spain)	Leila Ouahabi	Valencia	
	DF	(Spain)	Melisa Nicolau	Retired	
	MF	(Spain)	Alba Aznar	Transportes Alcaine	
	MF	(Spain)	Zaira Flores	Levante Las Planas	
	MF	(Spain)	Laura Gutiérrez	Levante	
	FW	(Spain)	Olga García	Levante	
	FW	(Argentina)	Florencia Quiñones	(Argentina) San Lorenzo de Almagro	

== Friendlies ==
=== Pre-season ===
8 August 2013 Friendly	Barcelona	12–0	(United States) Moravian College
	Sonia 7', 30'; Willy 14', 71', 76'; Carla 53'; Corredera 55', 58', 68', 88'; Alexia 65'; Ruth 82'	Report		Referee: Ainara Acevedo

10 August 2013 Friendly	L'Estartit	0–5	Barcelona
		Report	Melanie 25'; Vicky Losada; Carla; Kenti 53'; Sonia 73'

26 August 2013 Ladies First Cup – Semifinal	Wolfsburg (Germany)	2–0	Barcelona	Calais, France
20:30 (CEST)	Popp 63'; Fischer 67'	Report		Stadium: Stade de l'Épopée

28 August 2013 Ladies First Cup – Third place match	Barcelona	4–0	(Italy) Inter	Calais, France
18:00 (CEST)	Corredera 17'; Bermúdez 77'; Putellas 79'; Losada 88' (pen.)	Report		Stadium: Stade de l'Épopée

=== Mid-season ===
26 October 2013 Friendly	Cerdanyola	0–5	Barcelona
		Report
Note: Charity match for breast cancer awareness.

=== Post-season ===
The Getxo Tournament is contested between Basque women's football teams and top Iberian team invitees.

31 May 2014 Getxo Tournament Round-robin	Athletic Club (Basque Country (autonomous community))	2–1	Barcelona	Getxo
18:45	Erika 7'; Eunate 27'	Report	Willy 35'	Stadium: Municipal de Fadura; Referee: Jon Ander Goitia Martínez
Note: 40-minute match

31 May 2014 Getxo Tournament Round-robin	Barcelona	2–1	(Portugal) Clube de Albergaria	Getxo
19:45	Jenni; Chelsea (red card); Corredera	Aupa; Images	Almeida (pen.)	Stadium: Municipal de Fadura
Note: 40-minute match

1 June 2014 Getxo Tournament Final	Athletic Club (Basque Country (autonomous community))	1–1 (5–3 p)	Barcelona	Getxo
12:15	I. Murua 47'	Report	Willy 42'	Stadium: Municipal de Fadura; Attendance: 500; Referee: Guerrero Maté
	Penalties
	Garazi (penalty scored); Arranz (penalty scored); Orueta (penalty scored); Eunate (penalty scored); Izaskun (penalty scored)		(penalty scored) Gemma; (penalty scored) Romero; (penalty missed) Jelena; (penalty scored) Miriam
Note: 80-minute match

== Competitions ==
=== Overall record ===
Competition	First match	Last match	Starting round	Final position	Record							
Competition	First match	Last match	Starting round	Final position	Pld	W	D	L	GF	GA	GD	Win %
Primera División	8 September 2013	3 May 2014	Matchday 1	Winners	30	25	4	1	82	11	+71	83.33
Copa de la Reina	17 May 2014	22 June 2014	Quarterfinals	Winners	5	3	2	0	5	2	+3	60.00
Copa Catalunya	31 August 2013	1 September 2013	Semifinal	Runners-up	2	1	1	0	5	1	+4	50.00
UEFA Women's Champions League	9 October 2013	30 March 2014	Round of 32	Quarterfinals	6	2	2	2	8	8	+0	33.33
Total					43	31	9	3	100	22	+78	72.09

Source: Competitions

=== Primera División ===
Sonia Bermúdez scoring a penalty against Atlético Madrid on 13 April 2014, the victory that saw Barcelona win the league

==== Results summary ====
Overall								Home						Away					
Pld	W	D	L	GF	GA	GD	Pts	W	D	L	GF	GA	GD	W	D	L	GF	GA	GD
30	25	4	1	82	11	+71	79	14	1	0	50	6	+44	11	3	1	32	5	+27

Source: bdfutbol

==== Results by round ====
Round	1	2	3	4	5	6	7	8	9	10	11	12	13	14	15	16	17	18	19	20	21	22	23	24	25	26	27	28	29	30
Ground	H	A	H	A	H	A	H	A	H	A	A	H	A	H	A	A	H	A	H	A	H	A	H	A	H	H	A	H	A	H
Result	W	W	W	W	W	D	W	W	W	W	W	W	W	W	D	W	D	W	W	W	W	W	W	D	W	W	W	W	L	W

Updated to match(es) played on 3 May 2014. Source: La Liga
A = Away; H = Home; W = Win; D = Draw; L = Loss; P = Postponed

==== Matches ====
===== First split =====
8 September 2013 1	Barcelona	5–0	Collerense	Sant Joan Despí
	Míriam 35', 65', 68'; Sonia 37'; Vicky Losada 40'	Report		Stadium: Ciutat Esportiva Joan Gamper; Referee: Vico Moreno

15 September 2013 2	Real Sociedad	0–5	Barcelona	Zubieta
		Report	Torrejón 6'; Torrecilla 34'; Míriam 42'; Sonia 61'; Kenti Robles 72'	Stadium: Zubieta Facilities; Referee: Guadix Vivas

22 September 2013 3	Barcelona	10–0	Granada	Sant Joan Despí
	Sonia 15', 24', 38', 44', 60'; Marta Corredera 50', 65'; Alexia 72'; Torrecilla 83'; Pilar Garrote 87'	Report		Stadium: Ciutat Esportiva Joan Gamper; Referee: Carlos Albelda Bárcena

29 September 2013 4	Espanyol	0–3	Barcelona	Sant Adrià del Besòs
		Report	Marta Corredera 3'; Ruth 46'; Sonia 74'	Stadium: Ciutat Esportiva de Sant Adrià; Referee: Francisco Javier Pazo Mora

6 October 2013 5	Barcelona	2–0	Rayo Vallecano	Sant Joan Despí
	Marta Corredera 6'; Vicky Losada 38'	Report		Stadium: Ciutat Esportiva Joan Gamper; Referee: Sauleda Torrent

13 October 2013 6	Oviedo Moderno	0–0	Barcelona	Oviedo
		Report		Stadium: Estadio Manuel Díaz Vega; Referee: Farto García

20 October 2013 7	Barcelona	2–1	Transportes Alcaine	Sant Joan Despí
	Marta Corredera 17'; Vicky Losada 79'	Report	Clara 63'	Stadium: Ciutat Esportiva Joan Gamper; Referee: Calle Martinez

3 November 2013 8	Levante Las Planas	0–3	Barcelona	Sant Joan Despí
		Report	Sonia 12', 40', 48'	Stadium: Les Planes; Referee: Héctor Robas Bondia

17 November 2013 10	Athletic Club	1–2	Barcelona	Lezama
	Irune Murua 6'	Report	Vicky Losada 53', 84'	Stadium: Lezama Facilities; Referee: Elexpuru Sanz

30 November 2013 11	Valencia	0–1	Barcelona	Paterna
		Report	Sonia 26'	Stadium: Ciutat Esportiva de Paterna; Referee: Francisco Javier Fernández Vidal

7 December 2013 12	Barcelona	2–1	Atlético Madrid	Sant Joan Despí
	Sonia 31'; Jelena 42'	Report	Pisco 62' (pen.)	Stadium: Ciutat Esportiva Joan Gamper; Referee: Ana Zardain López

15 December 2013 13	Sant Gabriel	0–4	Barcelona	Sant Adrià de Besòs
		Report	Alexia 1', 10'; Míriam 85'; Unzue 87'	Stadium: Estadi José Luis Ruiz Casado; Referee: Carlos Albelda Bárcena

21 December 2013 9	Barcelona	1–0	Levante	Sant Joan Despí
	Alexia 3'	Report		Stadium: Ciutat Esportiva Joan Gamper; Referee: Carlos Rodríguez Enrique

29 December 2013 14	Barcelona	3–0	Sporting Huelva	Sant Joan Despí
	Jelena 41', 53'; Sonia 46'	Report		Stadium: Ciutat Esportiva Joan Gamper; Referee: Juan Manuel Martín Varas

4 January 2014 15	Sevilla	0–0	Barcelona	Seville
		Report		Stadium: Ciudad Deportiva Cisneros Palacios; Referee: Miguel Ángel Fernández Delgado

===== Second split =====
12 January 2014 16	Collerense	0–1	Barcelona	Palma de Mallorca
		Report	Jelena 58'	Stadium: Camp Municipal Coll d'en Rebassa Ca'n Caimari; Referee: Luis de Oleza

19 January 2014 17	Barcelona	2–2	Real Sociedad	Sant Joan Despí
	Sonia 48'; Míriam 90'	Report	Aintzane 66'; Nahikari 73'	Stadium: Ciutat Esportiva Joan Gamper; Referee: Carballo Vázquez

26 January 2014 18	Granada	0–3	Barcelona	Granada
		Report	Jenni 35'; Sonia 45'; Alexia 75'	Stadium: Estadio Miguel Prieto; Referee: Jacob Yáñez Megías

1 February 2014 19	Barcelona	4–0	Espanyol	Sant Joan Despí
	Alexia 2'; Sonia 36', 55'; Jenni 52'	Report		Stadium: Ciutat Esportiva Joan Gamper; Referee: Alejandro Fernández Pérez

9 February 2014 20	Rayo Vallecano	0–1	Barcelona	Madrid
		Report	Carol 68'	Stadium: Ciudad Deportiva Fundación Rayo Vallecano; Referee: Sergio Simón García

16 February 2014 21	Barcelona	4–1	Oviedo Moderno	Sant Joan Despí
	Jenni 10'; Sonia 21', 30'; Vicky Losada 49'	Report	Lucía García 31'	Stadium: Ciutat Esportiva Joan Gamper; Referee: Pau García Fuster

2 March 2014 22	Transportes Alcaine	1–4	Barcelona	Zaragoza
	Alba 59'	Report	Míriam 16'; Sonia 25'; Jenni 67'; Jelena 89'	Stadium: Estadi Pedro Sancho; Referee: Diego Blasco Val

9 March 2014 23	Barcelona	4–0	Levante Las Planas	Sant Joan Despí
	Sonia 35', 37', 38'; Jenni 68'	Report		Stadium: Ciutat Esportiva Joan Gamper; Referee: López Carballo

15 March 2014 24	Levante	1–1	Barcelona	Valencia
	Olga García 90+6' (pen.)	Report	Míriam 62'	Stadium: Poliesportiu de Nazaret; Referee: Miguel Ángel Ruiz García

19 March 2014 26	Barcelona	1–0	Valencia	Sant Joan Despí
	Sonia 21' (pen.)	Report		Stadium: Ciutat Esportiva Joan Gamper; Referee: Xavier Bertomeu García

26 March 2014 25	Barcelona	1–0	Athletic Club	Sant Joan Despí
	Jenni 73'	Report		Stadium: Ciutat Esportiva Joan Gamper; Referee: García Rosel

13 April 2014 27	Atlético Madrid	0–3	Barcelona	Majadahonda
		Report	Sonia 15', 32' (pen.); Jenni 49'	Stadium: Cerro del Espino; Referee: Óscar Pecharromán Pérez

20 April 2014 28	Barcelona	5–1	Sant Gabriel	Sant Joan Despí
	Corredera 20'; Alexia 53', 63'; Jenni 81'; Gemma 90'	Report	Chini 82'	Stadium: Ciutat Esportiva Joan Gamper; Referee: Arnau Llopart Carbó

27 April 2014 29	Sporting Huelva	2–1	Barcelona	San Juan del Puerto
	Martín-Prieto 1', 73'	Report	Torrecilla 50'	Stadium: Estadio Pepe San Andrés; Referee: Rodríguez Varela

3 May 2014 30	Barcelona	4–0	Sevilla	Sant Joan Despí
	Ruth 29'; Núria Garrote 46'; Torrecilla 65'; Jenni 79'	Report		Stadium: Ciutat Esportiva Joan Gamper; Referee: Calderiña Pavón

Source: bdfutbol

=== Copa de la Reina ===
17 May 2014 Quarterfinals – First leg	Real Sociedad	0–1	Barcelona	Donostia/San Sebastián
18:00 (CEST)		Report	Putellas 67'	Stadium: Zubietako kirol-instalakuntzak Referee: Ortiz Extremo

25 May 2014 Quarterfinals – Second leg	Barcelona	0–0	Real Sociedad	Sant Joan Despí
16:00 (CEST)		Report		Stadium: Ciutat Esportiva Joan Gamper; Referee: Oliva Bueno

8 June 2014 Semifinals – First leg	Barcelona	2–1	Rayo Vallecano	Sant Joan Despí
12:00 (CEST)	Diéguez 36'; Putellas 40'	Report	Mascaró 71'	Stadium: Ciutat Esportiva Joan Gamper

14 June 2014 Semifinals – Second leg	Rayo Vallecano	0–1	Barcelona	Madrid
		Report	Corredera 76'

21 June 2014 Final	Athletic Club	1–1 (a.e.t.) (4–5 p)	Barcelona	Ceuta
	Nekane 94'	Report	Putellas 98'	Stadium: Estadio Alfonso Murube; Referee: Frías Acedo
	Penalties
	Gimbert (penalty scored); Paredes (penalty missed); Erika (penalty scored); Ibarra (penalty scored); Orueta (penalty scored)		(penalty scored) Unzué; (penalty scored) Corredera; (penalty scored) Gómez; (penalty scored) Hermoso; (penalty scored) Putellas
Note: Barcelona win by penalty shoot-out.

=== Copa Catalunya ===
Barcelona's quarterfinal match of the 2013 Copa Catalunya, played before 30 June 2013, is considered part of the 2012–13 season.

31 August 2013 Semifinal	Barcelona	4–0	Levante Las Planas	Sant Boi de Llobregat
10:00	Vicky 16'; Alexia 28'; Sonia 48'; Kenti 88'	Report		Stadium: Municipal Joan Baptista Milà; Referee: Meritxell Bernat Salvat

1 September 2013 Final	Barcelona	1–1 (3–4 p)	Espanyol	Sant Boi de Llobregat
	Sonia 14'	Report	Núria Mendoza 76'	Stadium: Municipal Joan Baptista Milà; Referee: Ana Zardaín López
	Penalties
	Vicky (penalty missed); Romi (penalty scored); Laura (penalty scored); Gemma (penalty missed); Alèxia (penalty scored); Kenti (penalty missed)		(penalty scored) Sara Navarro; (penalty scored) Pereira; (penalty scored) Bárbara; (penalty missed) Paloma; (penalty missed) Jamila; (penalty scored) Júlia
Note: Espanyol win by penalty shoot-out.

=== UEFA Women's Champions League ===
==== Knockout phase ====
9 October 2013 Round of 32 – First leg	Barcelona	0–0	(Denmark) Brøndby	Barcelona
19:00		Report		Stadium: Mini Estadi; Attendance: 827; Referee: Gyöngyi Gaál (Hungary)

16 October 2013 Round of 32 – Second leg	Brøndby (Denmark)	2–2	Barcelona	Brøndby, Denmark
18:30	Thorsen 25'; Boye Sørensen 90+4'	Report	Corredera 52'; Čanković 87'	Stadium: Brøndby Stadium; Attendance: 5,653; Referee: Cristina Dorcioman (Romania)
Note: 2–2 on aggregate. Barcelona won on away goals.

10 November 2013 Round of 16 – First leg	Barcelona	3–0	(Switzerland) Zürich	Barcelona
12:00	Sonia 1', 90'; Losada 70'	Report		Stadium: Mini Estadi; Attendance: 1,169; Referee: Monika Mularczyk (Poland)

13 November 2013 Round of 16 – Second leg	Zürich (Switzerland)	1–3	Barcelona	Zürich, Switzerland
19:00	Torrejón 24' (o.g.)	Report	García 36'; Corredera 64'; Čanković 82'	Stadium: Letzigrund; Attendance: 7,304; Referee: Anastasia Pustovoitova (Russia)

23 March 2014 Quarterfinal – First leg	Wolfsburg (Germany)	3–0	Barcelona	Wolfsburg, Germany
17:15	Keßler 34'; Müller 52'; Jakabfi 65'	Report		Stadium: VfL-Stadion am Elsterweg; Attendance: 7,985; Referee: Morag Pirie (Scotland)

30 March 2014 Quarterfinal – Second leg	Barcelona	0–2	(Germany) Wolfsburg	Barcelona
12:15		Report	Keßler 45+1'; Müller 74'	Stadium: Mini Estadi; Attendance: 793; Referee: Teodora Albon (Romania)

== Statistics ==
=== Overall ===
As of 21 June 2014

No..	Pos.	Nat.	Player	Primera División		Copa de la Reina		Copa Catalunya		Champions League		Total		Discipline		Notes
No..	Pos.	Nat.	Player	Apps	Goals	Apps	Goals	Apps	Goals	Apps	Goals	Apps	Goals	Yellow card	Red card	Notes
Goalkeepers
1	GK	(Spain)	Laura Ràfols	22	0	5	0	2	0	6	0	35	0	0	0	
13	GK	(England)	Chelsea Ashurst	8	0	0	0	0+2	0	0	0	10	0	0	0	
Defenders
2	DF	(Spain)	Marta Unzué	28+2	1	5	0	2	0	6	0	43	1	2	0	Also wore 4
3	DF	(Spain)	Marta Torrejón	30	1	5	0	2	0	6	0	43	1	1	0	Also wore 23
4	DF	(Spain)	Ruth García	29	2	5	0	2	0	6	1	42	3	1	0	Also wore 18
5	DF	(Spain)	Melanie Serrano	28	0	4	0	2	0	6	0	40	0	5	0	
12	DF	(Spain)	Núria Garrote	2	1	0+2	0	0+2	0	0	0	6	1	0	0	Also wore 11
15	DF	(Spain)	Laura Gómez	2+14	0	2+1	0	0+2	0	0+3	0	24	0	0	0	Also wore 3, 5 and 14
	DF	(Spain)	Grau	0+1	0	0	0	0	0	0	0	1	0	0	0	
Midfielders
6	MF	(Spain)	Virginia Torrecilla	27+1	4	5	0	2	0	5	0	40	4	6	0	Also wore 21
8	MF	(Spain)	Míriam Diéguez	28+2	8	5	1	2	0	6	0	43	9	2	0	
9	MF	(Spain)	Vicky Losada	13+4	6	0	0	2	1	4	1	23	8	0	0	Also wore 8
14	MF	(Spain)	Esther Romero	4+15	0	0+1	0	0+2	0	2+2	0	26	0	1	0	Also wore 6 and 15
16	MF	(Spain)	Gemma Gili	3+16	1	0+3	0	0+2	0	1+2	0	27	1	0	0	Also wore 8 and 14
17	MF	(Spain)	Cristina Baudet	0	0	1+2	0	0	0	0	0	3	0	0	0	
	MF	(Spain)	Pilar Garrote	0+1	1	0	0	0	0	0	0	1	1	0	0	
	MF	(Spain)	Sandra Hernández	0	0	0+3	0	0	0	0	0	3	0	0	0	
Forwards
7	FW	(Spain)	Marta Corredera	24+6	6	4+1	1	2	0	6	2	43	9	1	0	Also wore 11
9	FW	(Spain)	Willy	3+2	0	5	0	0	0	0	0	10	0	0	0	Also wore 11
10	FW	(Spain)	Sonia Bermúdez	26+1	27	0	0	2	2	5+1	2	35	31	1	0	Also wore 11
11	FW	(Spain)	Alexia Putellas	30	8	5	3	2	1	6	0	43	12	0	0	Also wore 10 and 20
11	FW	(Spain)	Jenni Hermoso	12+1	9	5	0	0	0	0	0	18	9	0	0	Also wore 9
17	FW	(Mexico)	Kenti Robles	1+7	1	0	0	0+2	1	0+1	0	11	2	0	0	Also wore 2
18	FW	(Spain)	Andrea Falcón	1+7	0	0+1	0	0+2	0	0+2	0	13	0	0	0	Also wore 10 and 15
22	FW	(Serbia)	Jelena Čanković	9+11	5	0	0	0	0	1+3	2	24	7	1	0	Also wore 7 and 9
7	FW	(Spain)	Carolina Férez	0+14	1	0	0	0	0	0+1	0	15	1	0	0	
Own goals (1)

=== Goalscorers ===
As of 21 June 2014

Rank	No.	Pos.	Nat.	Player	Primera División	Copa de la Reina	Copa Catalunya	Champions League	Total
1	10	FW	(Spain)	Sonia Bermúdez	27	—	2	2	31
2	11	FW	(Spain)	Alexia Putellas	8	3	1	—	12
3	11	FW	(Spain)	Jenni Hermoso	9	—	—	—	9
3	8	MF	(Spain)	Míriam Diéguez	8	1	—	—	9
3	7	FW	(Spain)	Marta Corredera	6	1	—	2	9
6	9	MF	(Spain)	Vicky Losada	6	—	1	1	8
7	22	FW	(Serbia)	Jelena Čanković	5	—	—	2	7
8	6	MF	(Spain)	Virginia Torrecilla	4	—	—	—	4
9	4	DF	(Spain)	Ruth García	2	—	—	1	3
10	17	FW	(Mexico)	Kenti Robles	1	—	1	—	2
11	3	DF	(Spain)	Marta Torrejón	1	—	—	—	1
11		MF	(Spain)	Pilar Garrote	1	—	—	—	1
11	2	DF	(Spain)	Marta Unzué	1	—	—	—	1
11	7	FW	(Spain)	Carolina Férez	1	—	—	—	1
11	16	MF	(Spain)	Gemma Gili	1	—	—	—	1
11	12	DF	(Spain)	Núria Garrote	1	—	—	—	1
Own goals (from the opponents)					—	—	—	—	–
Totals					82	5	5	8	100

=== Cleansheets ===
As of 21 June 2014

Rank	No.	Nat.	Player	Primera División	Copa de la Reina	Copa Catalunya	Champions League	Total
1	1	(Spain)	Laura Ràfols	16	3	1	2	22
2	13	(England)	Chelsea Ashurst	5	—	—	—	5
Totals				21	3	1	2	27

=== Disciplinary record ===
As of 21 June 2014

No.	Pos.	Nat.	Player	Primera División			Copa de la Reina			Copa Catalunya			Champions League			Total		
No.	Pos.	Nat.	Player	Booked	(yellow card) (yellow-red card)	Sent off (straight red)	Booked	(yellow card) (yellow-red card)	Sent off (straight red)	Booked	(yellow card) (yellow-red card)	Sent off (straight red)	Booked	(yellow card) (yellow-red card)	Sent off (straight red)	Booked	(yellow card) (yellow-red card)	Sent off (straight red)
6	MF	(Spain)	Virginia Torrecilla	3			2						1			6		
5	DF	(Spain)	Melanie Serrano	3			1						1			5		
2	DF	(Spain)	Marta Unzué	1			1									2		
8	MF	(Spain)	Míriam Diéguez	1									1			2		
4	DF	(Spain)	Ruth García	1												1		
14	MF	(Spain)	Esther Romero	1												1		
7	FW	(Spain)	Marta Corredera	1												1		
3	DF	(Spain)	Marta Torrejón	1												1		
10	FW	(Spain)	Sonia Bermúdez	1												1		
22	FW	(Spain)	Jelena Čanković										1			1		
Totals				13			4						4			21		

Source: FCBarcelona.com
Ordered by (red card) , (second yellow card) and (yellow card)
(yellow card) = Number of bookings; (second yellow card) = Number of sending offs after a second yellow card; (red card) = Number of sending offs by a direct red card.
