= List of Spanish women's football transfers summer 2014 =

This is a list of Spanish women's football transfers in the summer transfer window 2015 by club. Primera División clubs are listed according to the 2014–15 season table.

== Primera División ==
=== In ===
- Source: Vavel

Team	Goalkeepers	Defenders	Midfielders	Forwards
FC Barcelona		Landa (Athletic)	Caldentey (Collerense); Hernández (St. Gabriel); Losada (Flash) ^{2}	Baudet (St. Gabriel); Bermúdez (Flash) ^{2}
Athletic Bilbao			Lizaso (R. Sociedad)	Corres (Aurrerá)
Atlético Madrid		(Portugal) Fontemanha (Boavista); Gálvez (Betis); D. García (Espanyol); V. García (Rayo); León (Espanyol)	Borja (Rayo); Pérez (St. Gabriel); Sosa (Sporting)	
Rayo Vallecano		Gudiel (Atlético)		(Equatorial Guinea) Boho (Atlético)
Levante UD				Martín (Flash)
Valencia CF		Nicart (St. Gabriel)	Beristain (R. Sociedad); Zornoza (Atlético)	Férez (Barcelona); Lareo (Athletic)
Real Sociedad	Quiñones (Mariño)		Fernández (Alcaine); Pizarro (Rayo)	Díaz-Cirauqui (Alcaine)
Sporting Huelva	Lara (Betis)	Perea (Sevilla)	(Brazil) Joyce (Rayo); Marqués (Espanyol)	Martínez (Ponferrada)
CE Sant Gabriel		Becerra (Espanyol); Estella (Espanyol); Muriana (Lleida)	C. García (Barcelona B)	A. García (futsal); Pelegrí (Lleida) (Japan) Sakurabayashi (Levante L.P.)
UD Collerense			Calero (St. Gabriel); Rodríguez (Algaidas)	
RCD Espanyol	Torrent (Lloret)	Estella (St. Gabriel); Juan (Levante L.P.); Torralbo (Granada)	(Mexico) Robles (Barcelona); Troyano (Atlético)	Aybar (Granada); Lomba (El Olivo)
Alcaine Zaragoza			Ruiz (Athletic)	(Portugal) Oliveira (Leixões)
Oviedo Moderno				(United States) Vega (Freeze)
Sevilla FC	(Mexico) Tajonar (At. Málaga)	Castaño (Anderlecht) (Romania) Oprea (C. Adeje)	Bocanegra (C. di Sora); Escudero (Triana); Fuentes (Levante L.P.); Mateos (Granada); Pérez (At. Málaga)	
Fundación Albacete	De Toro (La Solana)	Tebar (Murcia F.)	Carrión (CFF Albacete)	
Santa Teresa CD	De Francisco (Europa)	Folch (Alcaine); López (Atlético); Menayo (Puebla); Neira (Salamanca)	(Portugal) Pinto (At. Ouriense); Rubio (Olivenza)	García (Sevilla)

- ^{1} On loan
- ^{2} Back from loan

=== Out ===
- Source: Vavel

Team	Goalkeepers	Defenders	Midfielders	Forwards
FC Barcelona		Gómez (retired)	(Serbia) Cankovic (Spartak S.) (Mexico) Robles (Espanyol)	Férez (Valencia); Fernández (Bristol A.)
Athletic Bilbao	Guarrotxena (Abanto)	Landa (Barcelona)	Flaviano (Torres); Murua (L. Buccaneers); Ruiz (Alcaine)	
Atlético Madrid		Ballesteros (Móstoles); Gudiel (Rayo); Paula López (Sta. Teresa)	Peña (Tenerife Sur); Troyano (Espanyol); Zornoza (Valencia)	(Equatorial Guinea) Boho (Rayo); Valderas (Aurrerá)
Rayo Vallecano		Burgos (retired); Conde (SCSU); García (Atlético)	Borja (Atlético) (Brazil) Joyce (Sporting); Pizarro (Rayo)	Lázaro (Madrid)
Levante UD	Santiago (?)	Martínez (?)	González (?); Motoso (?)	Pérez (Torres)
Valencia CF		Peña (Aldaia)	Ves (Aldaia) (Austria) Wronski (St. Polten)	Mateos (Aldaia)
Real Sociedad	Azkarate (retired)	Aizpurua (?)	Agoues (R. di Romagna); Beristain (Valencia); Herrero (?)	
Sporting Huelva		Jurado (?)	Pérez (Betis); Sosa (Atlético)	
CE Sant Gabriel		Miret (Apaches); Nicart (Valencia)	Calero (Collerense); Gudiel (Rayo); Hernández (Barcelona); Pérez (Atlético); Pizarro (Rayo)	Baudet (Barcelona); Liria (Aldaia); Pinel (Aldaia); Villagrasa (Ripolet)
UD Collerense			Caldentey (Barcelona)	
RCD Espanyol				
Alcaine Zaragoza		Folch (Sta. Teresa) (Colombia) Gaitán (Gol Star)	Fernández (R. Sociedad)	Díaz-Cirauqui (R. Sociedad) (Colombia) Velásquez (Gol Star)
Oviedo Moderno				Madruga (?)
Sevilla FC		Ligero (Betis); Perea (Sporting)	A. González (Betis); L. González (Betis)	García (Sta. Teresa); Parra (Betis)
Fundación Albacete				
Santa Teresa CD	Asensio (?)		Marcos (?) (Portugal) De Oliveira (?); Pascual (Extremadura)	Domínguez (?); Johanna (?); Reyes (Extremadura)

- ^{1} On loan
- ^{2} Back from loan

== See also ==
- 2014–15 Primera División (women)
