= 2014 Copa de la Reina de Fútbol =

Tournament details
- Country: Spain
- Teams: 8

Final positions
- Champions: Barcelona (3rd title)
- Runners-up: Athletic Club

Tournament statistics
- Matches played: 8
- Goals scored: 11 (1.38 per match)
- Top goal scorer(s): Nekane Díez (4 goals)

The 2014 Copa de la Reina de Fútbol was the 32nd edition of the Spanish women's football national cup. It ran from 18 May to 22 June 2014, and was contested by the best eight teams in the 2013–14 Spanish Championship. Both the quarterfinals and the semifinals were two-legged ties, while the final was held in Estadio Alfonso Murube, Ceuta.

== Qualification ==
Location of the 2013-14 Copa de la Reina teams

Top eight positions of the 2013-14 Spanish First Division.

#	Team	Pld	W	D	L	GF	GA	Pt	2013
1	FC Barcelona	30	25	4	1	82	11	79	Same position
2	Athletic Club	30	22	3	5	79	22	69	Same position
3	Atlético Madrid	30	16	6	8	72	35	54	Same position
4	Rayo Vallecano	30	14	9	7	45	30	51	▲2
5	Levante	30	14	9	7	38	29	51	▼1
6	Valencia	30	15	6	9	45	27	51	▲7
7	Real Sociedad	30	10	10	10	36	34	40	▲3
8	Sporting de Huelva	30	11	7	12	41	42	40	▲1
9	Sant Gabriel	30	9	7	14	40	56	34	▼1
10	Collerense	30	10	4	16	45	62	34	▲4

=== Qualified teams by community ===
Autonomous community	Team/s
Andalusia	Sporting de Huelva
(Catalonia) Catalunya	FC Barcelona
(Basque Country (autonomous community)) Euskadi	Athletic Club, Real Sociedad
(Community of Madrid) Com. Madrid	Atlético Madrid, Rayo Vallecano
Valencian Community	Levante, Valencia

== Results ==
=== Bracket ===
Quarterfinals
1	Real Sociedad	0	0	0
8	FC Barcelona	1	0	1
4	Atlético Madrid	0	0	0 (2)
5	Rayo Vallecano	0	0	0 (3)
2	Athletic Club	1	4	5
7	Valencia	1	1	2
3	Sporting de Huelva	1	0	1
6	Levante	0	2	2

Semifinals
FC Barcelona	2	1	3
Rayo Vallecano	1	0	1
Athletic Club	0	2	2
Levante	0	0	0

Final
FC Barcelona	1
Athletic Club	1

2014 Copa de la Reina de Fútbol Champion
FC Barcelona

=== Quarterfinals ===
==== 1st leg ====
17 May 2014
18:00 (CEST)

Real Sociedad	0–1	FC Barcelona
	Report	Putellas 67'

Zubietako kirol-instalakuntzak, San Sebastián
Referee: Ortiz Extremo
18 May 2014
12:30 (CEST)

Atlético Madrid	0–0	Rayo Vallecano
	Report

Cerro del Espino, Majadahonda
Attendance: 450
Referee: García Mascaraque
18 May 2014
11:30 (CEST)

Athletic Club	1–1	Valencia
Murua 18'	Report	Lozano 53'

Campo de Lasesarre, Baracaldo
Referee: Salguero Castillero
18 May 2014
12:00 (CEST)

Sporting de Huelva	1–0	Levante
Virgy García 66'

Polideportivo Pepe San Andrés, San Juan del Puerto
Referee: García Lozano

==== 2nd leg ====
25 May 2014
16:00 (CEST)

FC Barcelona	0–0	Real Sociedad
	Report

Joan Gamper, Barcelona
Referee: Oliva Bueno
25 May 2014
12:30 (CEST)

Rayo Vallecano	0–0 (a.e.t.)	Atlético Madrid
	Report
Penalties
Saray (penalty missed); Catalá (penalty scored); P.Borja (penalty scored); Mendi (penalty missed); Ale (penalty scored)	3–2	(penalty scored) Kuki; (penalty missed) Pisco; (penalty scored) Calderón; (penalty missed) Sampedro; (penalty missed) Carro

Ciudad Deportiva Rayo Vallecano, Madrid
Attendance: 500
Referee: Beatriz Gil
25 May 2014
12:00 (CEST)

Valencia	1–4	Athletic Club
Gio 33'	Report	Eunate 13'; Flaviano 31'; Nekane 72', 88'

Ciudad Deportiva de Paterna, Paterna
Attendance: 150
Referee: Navarro Collado
25 May 2014
12:00 (CEST)

Levante	2–0	Sporting de Huelva
Peque 85'; Anabel 90'	Report

Polideportivo de Nazaret, Valencia
Referee: Abad Esteban

=== Semifinals ===
==== 1st leg ====
8 June 2014
12:00 (CEST)

FC Barcelona	2-1	Rayo Vallecano
Diéguez 36'; Putellas 40'		Mascaró 71'

Ciutat Esportiva Joan Gamper
8 June 2014
12:00 (CEST)

Athletic Club	0-0	Levante

Campo de Sarriena, Leioa
Referee: Arriola Echeverría

==== 2nd leg ====
15 June 2014

Rayo Vallecano	0-1	FC Barcelona
		Corredera 76'

15 June 2014

Levante	0-2	Athletic Club
		Nekane Díez 42'; Erika Vázquez 60'

=== Final ===
22 June 2014

Athletic Club	1–1 (a.e.t.)	FC Barcelona
Nekane 94'		Putellas 98'
Penalties
Gimbert (penalty scored); Paredes (penalty missed); Erika (penalty scored); Ibarra (penalty scored); Orueta (penalty scored)	4–5	(penalty scored) Unzué; (penalty scored) Corredera; (penalty scored) Gómez; (penalty scored) Hermoso; (penalty scored) Putellas

Estadio Alfonso Murube, Ceuta
Referee: Frías Acedo

Athletic Club	Barcelona

GK	1	(Spain) Ainhoa Tirapu
DF	4	(Spain) Irene Paredes
DF	10	(Spain) Iraia Iturregi		(substituted off) 112'
DF	18	(Spain) Leire Landa		(substituted off) 46'
DF	21	(Spain) Vanesa Gimbert
MF	6	(Spain) Joana Flaviano		(substituted off) 73'
MF	8	(Spain) Arrate Orueta
MF	15	(Spain) Alazne Gómez	(yellow card) 18'	(substituted off) 52'
MF	17	(Spain) Eli Ibarra
FW	7	(Spain) Nekane Díez
FW	19	(Spain) Erika Vázquez
Substitutes:
GK	25	(Spain) Jone Guarrotxena
DF	2	(Spain) Eztizen Merino		(substituted on) 73'
DF	3	(Spain) Joana Arranz		(substituted on) 112'
FW	9	(Spain) Irune Murua		(substituted on) 46'
MF	11	(Spain) Silvia Ruiz
MF	14	(Spain) Eunate Arraiza		(substituted on) 52'
FW	24	(Spain) Izaskun Leoz
Manager:
(Spain) Juan Luis Fuentes

GK	1	(Spain) Laura Ràfols
DF	2	(Spain) Marta Unzué
DF	3	(Spain) Marta Torrejón
DF	4	(Spain) Ruth García
DF	5	(Spain) Melanie Serrano		(substituted off) 80'
MF	6	(Spain) Virginia Torrecilla	(yellow card) 89'
MF	8	(Spain) Míriam Diéguez
MF	10	(Spain) Alexia Putellas
FW	7	(Spain) Marta Corredera
FW	9	(Spain) Willy
FW	11	(Spain) Jennifer Hermoso
Substitutes:
GK	13	(England) Chelsea Ashurst
MF	12	(Spain) Núria Garrote
MF	14	(Spain) Romi
DF	15	(Spain) Laura Gómez		(substituted on) 80'
DF	16	(Spain) Gemma Gili		(substituted on) 74'
MF	17	(Spain) Cristina Baudet
FW	18	(Spain) Andrea Falcón
Manager:
(Spain) Xavi Llorens

=== Goalscorers ===
3 goals:

- Nekane Díez
- Alexia Putellas

1 goal:

- Eunate Arraiza
- Joana Flaviano
- Irune Murua
- Erika Vázquez
- Marta Corredera
- Miriam Diéguez
- Anabel Martínez
- María Pérez "Peque"
- Patricia Mascaró
- Virgy García
- "Gio" Carreras
- Arantxa Lozano
