= 2013 Copa Catalunya (women's football) =

The 2013 Copa Catalunya Femenina was the ninth edition of the competition, running from May 25 to September 1, 2013. RCD Espanyol defeated FC Barcelona on penalties in the final, held in Sant Boi de Llobregat, ending Barcelona's 4-year winning streak.

== Preliminary stages ==
=== First stage ===
May 25–26, 2013

| Equipo Local | Resultado | Equipo Visitante |
|---|---|---|
| Santfeliuenc | 0 - 3 | Sabadell |
| Sant Quirze | 0 - 4 | Igualada |
| CE Europa | 1 - 1 | UE Sant Andreu ^{1} |

^{1} UE Andreu won 2-3 on penalties.

=== Second stage ===
June 1–2, 2013

| Equipo Local | Resultado | Equipo Visitante |
|---|---|---|
| Pallejà | 3 - 3 | Cerdanyola ^{2} |
| Sabadell | 2 - 0 | Cabanes |
| Penya La Roca | 0 - 6 | Atlètic Prat |
| Llerona | 1 - 1 | CF Igualada ^{3} |
| Pardinyes | 1 - 2 | Escola Valls |
| Bellavista Milan | 0 - 8 | UE Sant Andreu |
| CF Santpedor | 2 - 3 | Escola Bonaire |
| EC Les Garrigues | 2 - 1 | Guineueta |

^{2} Cerdanyola won 4-5 on penalties.
^{3} Igualada won 3-5 on penalties.

=== Third stage ===
June 8–9, 2013

| Equipo Local | Resultado | Equipo Visitante |
|---|---|---|
| Sabadell | 4 - 1 | Cerdanyola |
| Atlètic Prat | 0 - 2 | Igualada |
| Escola Valls | 4 - 0 | Sant Andreu |
| Escola Les Garrigues | 4 - 3 | Escola Bonaire |

== Final stages ==
Quarter-finals; June 15–16, 2013
Sabadell | 0
Barcelona | 13
Igualada | 2
Levante Las Planas ^{4} | 2
Escola Valls | 1
Espanyol | 8
Escola Les Garrigues ^{5} | 2
Sant Gabriel | 2

Semi-finals; August 31, 2013
Barcelona | 4
Levante Las Planas | 0
Espanyol | 9
Escola Les Garrigues | 0

Final; September 1, 2013
Barcelona ^{6} | 1
Espanyol | 1

^{4} Levante Las Planas won 1-4 on penalties.
^{5} Escola Les Garrigues won on penalties.
^{6} Espanyol won 3-4 on penalties.

=== Final ===
September 1, 2013
21:45 (CEST)

| Barcelona | 1 – 1 | Espanyol |
|---|---|---|
| Bermúdez 14' | Report | Mendoza 77' |
Penalties
| Losada (penalty missed); E. Romero (penalty scored); Gómez (penalty scored); Gili (penalty missed); Putellas (penalty scored); Robles (penalty missed) | 3 - 4 | (penalty scored) Navarro; (penalty scored) Pereira; (penalty scored) Latorre; (penalty missed) Fernández; (penalty missed) Martins; (penalty scored) Rebollo |

Joan Baptista Milà, Sant Boi de Llobregat
Referee: Zardaín López
