= Cristina Baudet =

Spanish footballer

Personal information
- Full name: Cristina Baudet Lucena
- Date of birth: 8 July 1991 (age 35)
- Place of birth: Santa Coloma de Gramenet, Catalonia, Spain
- Height: 1.65 m (5 ft 5 in)
- Positions: Midfielder; forward

Team information
- Current team: Espanyol
- Number: 21

Senior career*
Years	Team	Apps	(Gls)
2007–2014	Sant Gabriel	94	(17)
2014–2016	Barcelona	21	(4)
2016–2023	Espanyol	183	(29)
2023–2025	Levante Las Planas	30	(5)
2025–	Espanyol	1	(0)

International career^{‡}
2016–	Catalonia	4	(1)
- * Club domestic league appearances and goals as of 21:58, 9 February 2025 (UTC) ‡ National team caps and goals as of 23:11, 7 February 2025 (UTC)

Cristina Baudet Lucena (born 8 July 1991) is a Spanish footballer from Catalonia who plays as a midfielder for Liga F team Espanyol and the Catalonia national team. She has previously played for Sant Gabriel, Barcelona and Levante Las Planas.

== Early and personal life ==
Cristina Baudet Lucena was born in Santa Coloma de Gramenet on 8 July 1991. She has two niblings.

In February 2026, Baudet got engaged to fellow footballer and former Espanyol teammate Marta Turmo.

== Club career ==
=== Sant Gabriel (2007–14) ===
Though Sant Gabriel went out in the quarter-finals of the 2011 Copa de la Reina de Fútbol, Baudet's hat-trick in the first round and a quarter-final goal meant she was the joint-top scorer of the tournament.

=== Barcelona (2014–16) ===
In May 2014, Baudet and Sant Gabriel teammate Sandra Hernández were signed to the dominant Barcelona. Baudet made her first appearance for Barcelona on 17 May 2014, playing for her new club in two matches of the 2014 Copa de la Reina – which they won – at the end of the 2013–14 season.

=== Espanyol (2016–23) ===
Baudet joined Espanyol in the summer of 2016, being named their captain and helping them to a leading start in the league. Quickly essential, she was given a new contract ahead of the 2017–18 season.

In the 2017-18 season, in which Espanyol finished one place above relegation, Baudet was their joint-top scorer (with Elisa del Estal). On matchday 18, Baudet was named the league's player of the week.

She remained with the team during their fight to gain promotion back to the top flight before leaving upon the expiry of her contract in July 2023, while still captain.

=== Levante Las Planas/Badalona (2023–25) ===
Baudet scored the renamed Levante Badalona's third goal with an impressive first-time strike in their 3–4 loss to Real Betis in November 2024.

=== Espanyol (2025–present) ===
On 31 January 2025, Baudet returned to Espanyol.

== International career ==
Baudet was called up to the Catalonia women's national football team, playing and scoring against Paraguay in April 2024.

== Career statistics ==
=== Club ===
As of match played 9 February 2025.

Appearances and goals by club, season and competition
Club	Season	League			Cup (Note: Includes the Copa de la Reina)		Catalan Cup (Note: Includes the Copa Catalunya)		Europe (Note: Includes the UEFA Women's Champions League)		Total	
Club	Season	Division	Apps	Goals	Apps	Goals	Apps	Goals	Apps	Goals	Apps	Goals
Sant Gabriel	2010–11	Superliga	23	5	4	4	?	?	—		27	9
Sant Gabriel	2011–12	Primera División	23	4	—		?	?	—		23	4
Sant Gabriel	2012–13	Primera División	24	5	2	0	?	?	—		26	5
Sant Gabriel	2013–14	Primera División	24	3	—		?	?	—		24	3
Sant Gabriel	Total		94	17	6	4	?	?	—		100	21
Barcelona	2013–14	Primera División	0	0	2	0	0	0	0	0	2	0
Barcelona	2014–15	Primera División	16	3	0	0	2	2	0	0	18	5
Barcelona	2015–16	Primera División	5	1	0	0	1	0	0	0	6	1
Barcelona	Total		21	4	2	0	3	2	0	0	26	6
Espanyol	2016–17	Primera División	30	2	—		?	?	—		30	2
Espanyol	2017–18	Primera División	28	4	—		?	?	—		28	4
Espanyol	2018–19	Primera División	28	4	1	0	?	?	—		29	4
Espanyol	2019–20	Primera División	18	2	1	0	2	0	—		21	2
Espanyol	2020–21	Primera División	24	8	—		—		—		24	8
Espanyol	2021–22	Segunda División Pro	29	7	1	0	—		—		30	7
Espanyol	2022–23	Primera Federación	26	2	1	0	—		—		27	2
Espanyol	Sub-total		183	29	4	0	2	0	—		189	29
Levante Las Planas	2023–24	Liga F	26	4	1	0	—		—		27	4
Levante Las Planas	2024–25	Liga F	4	1	1	0	—		—		5	1
Levante Las Planas	Total		30	5	2	0	—		—		32	5
Espanyol	2024–25	Liga F	1	0	0	0	0	0	—		1	0
Espanyol	Sub-total		1	0	0	0	0	0	—		1	0
Espanyol	Total		184	29	4	0	2	0	—		190	29
Career total			329	55	14	4	5	2	0	0	348	61

=== International ===
Statistics accurate as of match played 7 April 2024.

Year	Catalonia	
Year	Apps	Goals
2016	1	0
2019	1	0
2024	1	1
Total	3	1

As of match played 7 April 2024. Catalonia score listed first, score column indicates score after each Baudet goal.

International goals by date, venue, opponent, score, result and competition
No.	Date	Venue	Opponent	Score	Result	Competition	Ref.
1	7 April 2024	Estadi Palamós Costa Brava, Palamós, Catalonia, Spain	Paraguay	2–0	5–1	Friendly	

== Honours ==
Barcelona

- Primera División: 2014–15
- Copa de la Reina: 2014
- Copa Catalunya: 2014, 2015
