= Cris Cornejo =

Spanish footballer (born 1992)

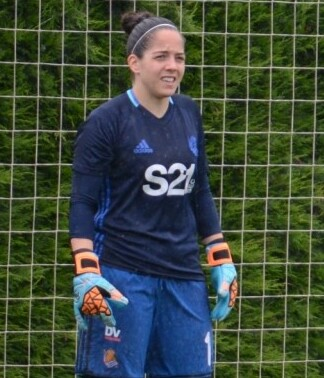
- Cornejo training with Real Sociedad, 2017

Personal information
- Full name: María Cristina Cornejo Vega
- Date of birth: 9 January 1992 (age 34)
- Place of birth: San Sebastián, Spain
- Height: 1.63 m (5 ft 4 in)
- Position: Goalkeeper

Team information
- Current team: Alavés
- Number: 1

Senior career*
Years	Team	Apps	(Gls)
2008–2009	Intxaurdi		
2009–2018	Real Sociedad	100	(0)
2018–2019	Eibar		
2019–2022	Alavés	69	(0)

International career^{‡}
2014–2015	Basque Country	3	(0)
- * Club domestic league appearances and goals as of 1 August 2022 ‡ National team caps and goals as of 07:57, 19 October 2021 (UTC)

María Cristina "Cris" Cornejo Vega (born 9 January 1992) is a Spanish footballer who last played for Alavés as a goalkeeper.

She began her career in the Basque regional leagues with Intxaurdi KE, being signed by Real Sociedad who soon gave the 16-year-old her Primera División debut. She remained with the Txuri-urdin for nine seasons, making over 100 appearances, although she was often second-choice in the squad behind the older Sokoa Azkarate, then the younger Mariasun Quiñones.

In 2018, Cornejo moved to second-tier Eibar along with three Real Sociedad teammates, and helped them to finish in a position to move into the new Segunda División Pro. A year later – along with defender Gaste, another of the group who had switched to Eibar – she signed for Alavés, of the same level, and was the regular goalkeeper as they won the title and gained promotion to the Primera in the 2020–21 season.
