= Sarah Wronski =

Austrian footballer

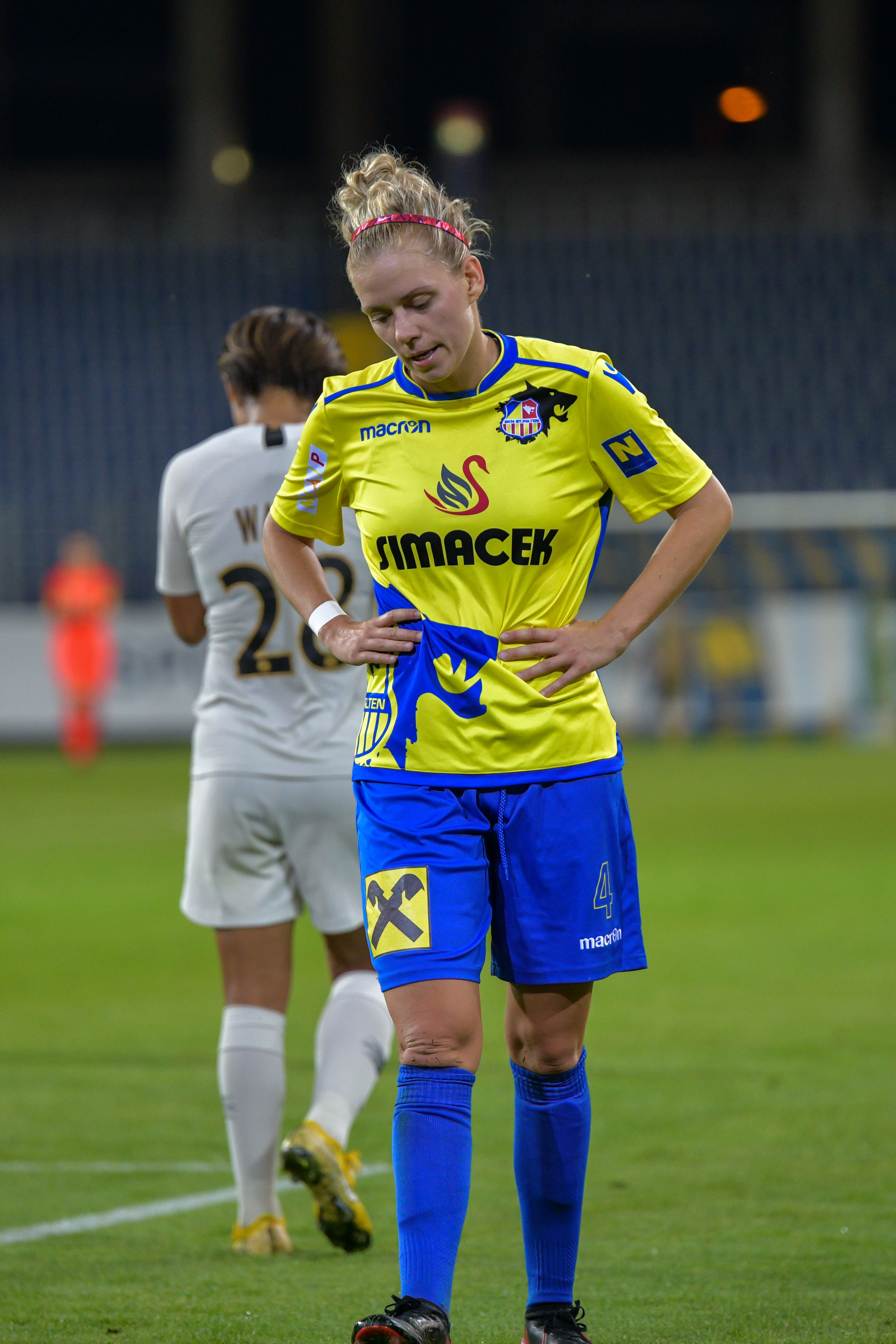

Personal information
- Date of birth: 9 November 1993 (age 33)
- Place of birth: Vienna, Austria
- Position: Defender

Team information
- Current team: First Vienna FC

Sarah Wronski (born 9 November 1993), is an Austrian football defender for First Vienna FC in the Austrian ÖFB-Frauenliga. In 2017 she left Valencia.
