= Gaste =

Spanish footballer (born 1993)

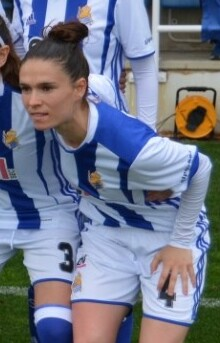
- Gaste with Real Sociedad, 2017

Personal information
- Full name: Itziar Gastearena Artola
- Date of birth: 4 May 1993 (age 33)
- Place of birth: Amasa-Villabona, Spain
- Height: 1.61 m (5 ft 3 in)
- Position: Defender

Team information
- Current team: Alavés
- Number: 4

Senior career*
| Years | Team | Apps | (Gls) |
| 2009–2011 | Tolosa | | |
| 2011–2018 | Real Sociedad | 181 | (3) |
| 2018–2019 | Eibar | | |
| 2019–2022 | Alavés | 52 | (0) |
| 2022–2024 | Granada | 40 | (0) |
| 2024– | Alavés | | |

International career^{‡}
| 2017– | Basque Country | 2 | (0) |
- * Club domestic league appearances and goals as of 22:46, 16 December 2023 (UTC) ‡ National team caps and goals as of 22:45, 16 December 2023 (UTC)

Itziar Gastearena Artola (born 4 May 1993) is a Spanish footballer who plays as a defender for Alavés.

== Club career ==
Gaste started her career at Tolosa. She was with Real Sociedad for seven seasons, making nearly 200 appearances for the Txuri-urdin and recovering from a serious anterior cruciate ligament injury to her right knee sustained in 2016.

In 2018 she signed for Eibar, moving between the Gipuzkoan clubs along with three Real teammates. A year later – along with goalkeeper Cris Cornejo, another of the group who had switched to Eibar – Gaste moved on to Alavés, of the same level, and was a regular member of the team as they won the Segunda División Pro title and gained promotion to the Primera in the 2020–21 season. In 2022 she joined Granada, and a year later was again part of a promotion-winning squad, this time via the playoffs (overcoming Osasuna then Deportivo de La Coruña).

She has been selected for the unofficial Basque Country women's national football team which plays only occasionally.
