= Sokoa Azkarate =

Spanish footballer (born 1979)

Personal information
- Full name: Sokoa Azkarate Arregi
- Date of birth: 10 May 1979 (age 47)
- Place of birth: Mondragón, Spain
- Height: 1.73 m (5 ft 8 in)
- Position: Goalkeeper

Senior career*
Years	Team	Apps	(Gls)
1996–2008	Mondragón		
2008–2014	Real Sociedad	94	(0)
- * Club domestic league appearances and goals

Sokoa Azkarate is a Spanish former football goalkeeper who played mainly for Real Sociedad in the Spanish First Division, where she competed for the position with the younger Cris Cornejo until retiring in 2014 aged 35. Prior to playing football, she was a basketball player for five years.
