= Virginia Torrecilla =

Spanish footballer

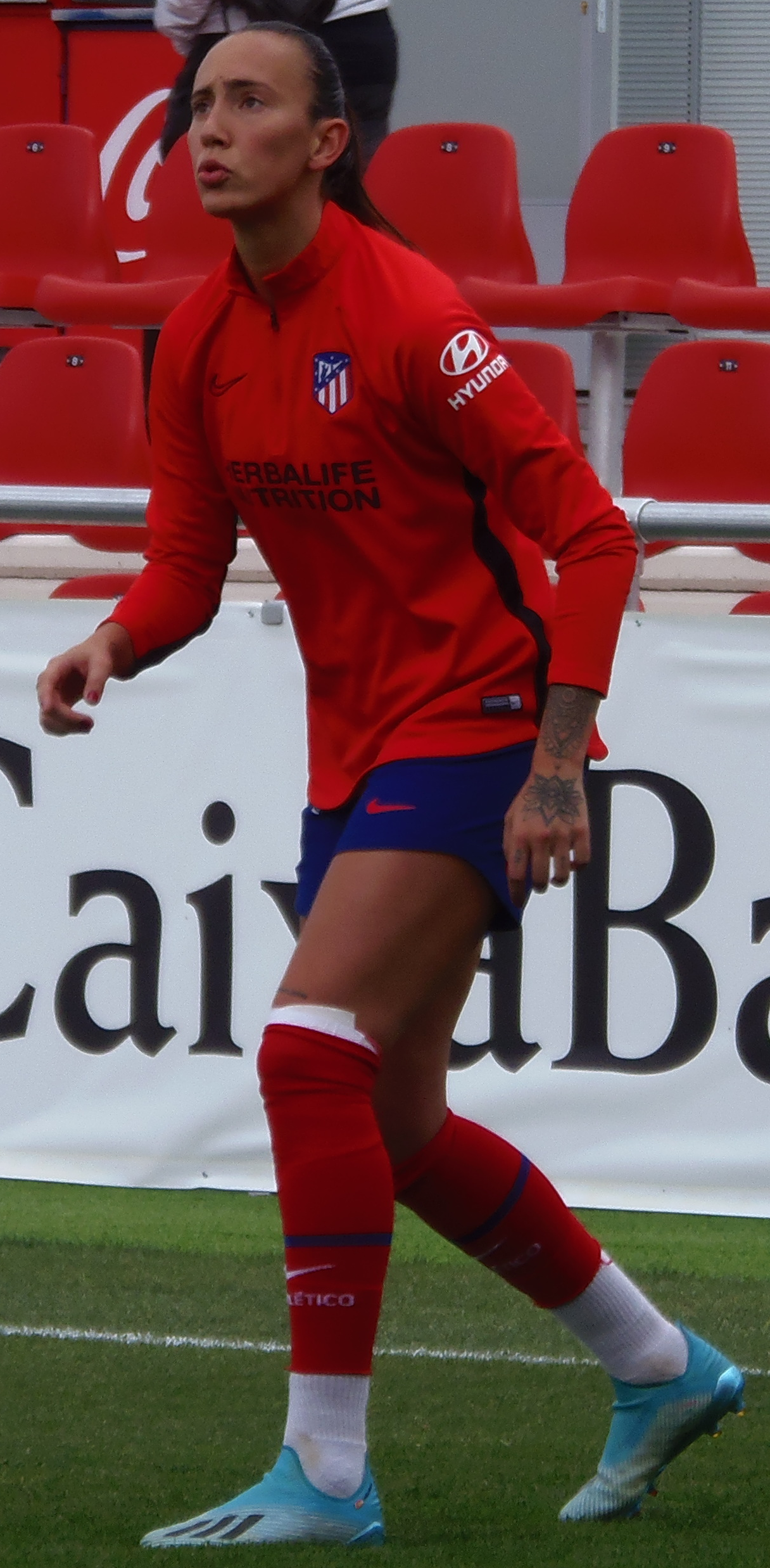
- Torrecilla training with Atlético Madrid in October 2019

Personal information
- Full name: Virginia Torrecilla Reyes
- Date of birth: 4 September 1994 (age 32)
- Place of birth: Cala Millor, Spain
- Height: 1.73 m (5 ft 8 in)
- Position: Midfielder

Youth career
- –2009: Serverense

Senior career*
Years	Team	Apps	(Gls)
2009–2011	Collerense	48	(7)
2011–2012	Sporting Ciutat de Palma		
2012–2015	Barcelona	85	(7)
2015–2019	Montpellier	74	(7)
2019–2023	Atlético Madrid	27	(0)
2023	Villarreal	8	(0)
2024	Atlético Baleares	13	(0)

International career
2013–2020	Spain	66	(7)
- * Club domestic league appearances and goals

Virginia Torrecilla Reyes (born 4 September 1994), simply known as Virginia, is a Spanish former professional footballer who played as a midfielder. She has played for Atlético Madrid, FC Barcelona, French Division 1 Féminine team Montpellier HSC, and Villarreal CF. She also plays for the Spain national team at senior international level. A versatile player, Torrecilla can perform in the full-back, midfield or forward positions.

== Club career ==
Torrecilla started her football career in Serverense when she was 11 years old, progressing through the youth system at CD Serverense. At 15 years old she joined UD Collerense and went straight into the first team, becoming one of the youngest players to debut in the Superliga Femenina.

After two years, Torrecilla joined Sporting Atlético Ciutat de Palma. She stayed for one season then made a transfer to Barcelona, which had been anticipated by months of rumours.

In her first season with Barcelona, the team won the league and cup double. In September and October 2012 Torrecilla played in her first UEFA Women's Champions League matches, as Barcelona were hopelessly worsted 7–0 by Arsenal over two legs.

After three seasons at Barcelona she moved to Montpellier HSC ahead of the 2015–16 campaign. In July 2019, Torrecilla returned to the Primera División, signing a two-year deal with reigning champions Atlético Madrid.

== International career ==
In 2012 Torrecilla was proud to be part of the Spain team which reached the final of the 2012 UEFA Women's U-19 Championship, where they were beaten 1–0 by Sweden after extra time.

Torrecilla made her senior debut for the Spain women's national football team in June 2013, a 2–2 friendly draw with Denmark in Vejle. The following day, national team coach Ignacio Quereda confirmed her as a member of his 23-player squad for the UEFA Women's Euro 2013 finals in Sweden. As the youngest player in the squad, Torrecilla was surprised but happy to be included. Although generally deployed as a defensive midfielder by Barcelona, she was content to play anywhere required by the national team.

She was part of Spain's squad at the 2015 FIFA Women's World Cup in Canada and the 2019 FIFA Women's World Cup in France.

=== International goals ===
Virginia Torrecilla – goals for Spain
#	Date	Venue	Opponent	Score	Result	Competition
1.	27 October 2015	Sonera Stadium, Helsinki	Finland	1–2	1–2	UEFA Women's Euro 2017 qualifying
2.	24 January 2016	Stadion pod Malim brdom, Petrovac	Montenegro	0–7	0–7	UEFA Women's Euro 2017 qualifying
3.	8 March 2016	Falkirk Stadium, Falkirk	Scotland	1–1	1-1	Friendly
4.	8 April 2016	Complexo Desportivo da Covilhã, Covilhã	Portugal	0–1	1–4	UEFA Women's Euro 2017 qualifying
5.	28 November 2017	Estadi de Son Moix, Palma	Austria	4–0	4–0	2019 FIFA Women's World Cup qualification
6.	5 April 2019	Estadio Vicente Sanz, Don Benito	Brazil	2-1	2-1	Friendly
7.	4 October 2019	Estadio Riazor, A Coruña	Azerbaijan	2–0	4-0	UEFA Women's Euro 2022 qualifying

== Honours ==
=== Club ===
==== Barcelona ====
- Primera División: Winner 2012–13, 2013–14, 2014–15
- Copa de la Reina de Fútbol: Winner 2013, 2014

=== International ===
- Algarve Cup: Winner 2017
- Cyprus Cup: Winner, 2018

== Personal life ==
On 21 May 2020, Torrecilla announced that she had been diagnosed with a brain tumor. She underwent successful surgery on 18 May, losing her hair in the process. She returned to training in March 2021. She returned to the pitch on January 23, 2022, and started as a sub in the Supercopa final match against FC Barcelona. Torrecilla came in 85' with a standing ovation from the public. Atlético lost the match 7–0.
