= Ruth García =

Spanish footballer (born 1987)

Personal information
- Full name: Ruth García García
- Date of birth: 26 March 1987 (age 39)
- Place of birth: Camporrobles, Spain
- Height: 1.68 m (5 ft 6 in)
- Position: Centre back

Youth career
- 2000–2004: CD Camporrobles

Senior career*
Years	Team	Apps	(Gls)
2004–2013	Levante	213	(41)
2013–2018	Barcelona	122	(8)
2018–2020	Levante	24	(1)

International career^{‡}
2003–2006	Spain U19	29	(1)
2005–2016	Spain	52	(4)
- * Club domestic league appearances and goals as of 11 April 2019 ‡ National team caps and goals as of 22:24, 18 June 2015 (UTC)

Ruth García García (born 26 March 1987) is a Spanish former footballer who played as a defender. She previously played for Barcelona and Levante UD. She has won the 2004 U19 Euro, three Leagues and six national Cups. She has taken part in the qualifiers of 2009 Euro, 2011 World Cup and 2013 Euro as well as being part of Spain national teams at the UEFA Women's Euro 2013 in Sweden and the 2015 FIFA Women's World Cup in Canada.

== Club career ==
García joined Levante as a 17-year-old in 2004 and progressed to become an important part of the team which won the Copa de la Reina in 2005 and 2007. Levante also won the 2007–08 Superliga Femenina, earning García participation in the 2008–09 UEFA Women's Cup.

In July 2013, club captain García departed Levante after nine seasons and was immediately linked with a move to champions FC Barcelona.

At the end of the 2019–2020 season, García made the decision to retire and joined the front offices of the Levante UD organization.

== International career ==
García is a veteran of Spain's 2004 UEFA Women's Under-19 Championship title win and their subsequent 2004 FIFA U-19 Women's World Championship campaign. She appeared for the senior Spain women's national football team in a 2–2 home draw with Finland on 15 February 2005.

In June 2013, national team coach Ignacio Quereda confirmed García as a member of his 23-player squad for the UEFA Women's Euro 2013 finals in Sweden.

Ruth was also called to be part of the squad at the 2015 FIFA Women's World Cup in Canada.

=== International goals ===
#	Date	Venue	Opponent	Score	Result	Competition
1.	16 February 2008	Aranda de Duero, Spain	Northern Ireland	4–0	4–0	UEFA Women's Euro 2009 qualifying
2.	26 June 2012	Aarau, Switzerland	Switzerland	1-2	4–3	UEFA Women's Euro 2013 qualifying
3.	23 November 2013	Aranjuez, Spain	Romania	1–0	1–0	2015 FIFA Women's World Cup qualifying
4.	18 September 2015	Weinan, China	China	0-1	1–3	Friendly

== Honours ==
=== Club ===
Levante UD

- Primera División (1): 2007–08
- Copa de la Reina de Fútbol (2): 2005, 2007

FC Barcelona

- Primera División (2): 2013–14, 2014–15
- Copa de la Reina de Fútbol (3): 2014, 2017, 2018

=== International ===
Spain

- UEFA Women's Under-19 Championship (1): 2004

== Personal life ==
She is graduated with a Bachelor of Physiotherapy.
