= Chelsea Ashurst =

English footballer (born 1990)

Personal information
- Full name: Chelsea Louise Ashurst
- Date of birth: 22 April 1990 (age 36)
- Place of birth: Normanton, West Yorkshire, England
- Height: 1.70 m (5 ft 7 in)
- Position: Goalkeeper

Team information
- Current team: Sporting de Huelva
- Number: 1

Senior career*
Years	Team	Apps	(Gls)
2008–2012	Atlético Málaga	84	(0)
2012–2013	Sporting de Huelva	19	(0)
2013–2015	Barcelona	10	(0)
2015–2019	Málaga	30	(0)
2019–	Sporting de Huelva	91	(0)
- * Club domestic league appearances and goals as of 8 January 2023

Chelsea Louise Ashurst (born 22 April 1990) is an English professional footballer who plays as a goalkeeper for Spanish Liga F club Sporting de Huelva.

Ashurst was born in Normanton in West Yorkshire, in the north of England, but moved to Granada in Andalusia, in the south of Spain, as a child. Raised in Granada, she has spent her whole football career in Spain.

Ashurst began playing football several years after moving to Spain, and tried out goalkeeping at about fourteen; she joined Club Atlético Málaga in Spain's top division at the age of fifteen.

== Honours ==
Barcelona

- Primera División: 2013–14, 2014–15
- Copa de la Reina: 2014
