= 2014–15 Primera División (women) =

Season of the Spanish Women's Football League

Primera División
- Season: 2014–15
- Champions: Barcelona (4th title)
- Relegated: Sevilla; Sant Gabriel
- Champions League: Barcelona; Atlético Madrid
- Matches: 240
- Goals: 743 (3.1 per match)
- Top goalscorer: Sonia Bermúdez; Adriana Martín (22 goals)
- Biggest home win: Barcelona 8–0 Fundación Albacete; Barcelona 8–0 Sevilla
- Biggest away win: Sevilla 0–8 Athletic Bilbao
- Highest scoring: Levante 8–1 Fundación Albacete
- Longest winning run: 15 games Barcelona
- Longest unbeaten run: 15 games Barcelona
- Longest losing run: 8 games Sant Gabriel
- All statistics correct as of 4 May 2015.

The 2014–15 Primera División Femenina de Fútbol was the 27th edition of Spain's highest women's football league.

Barcelona defended the title for the third straight season. The competition, running from 7 September 2014 to 3 May 2015, and was contested by sixteen teams, with Fundación Albacete and Santa Teresa CD making their debut.

For the first time two teams qualified to the UEFA Women's Champions League, as Spain has climbed into the top eight nations by UEFA coefficient.

== Stadia and locations ==
Location of (qualified) teams in Primera División 2014–15

Team	Home city	Stadium
Athletic Bilbao	(Basque Country (autonomous community)) Bilbao	Lezama
Atlético Madrid	Madrid	Cerro del Espino
Barcelona	(Catalonia) Barcelona	Ciutat Esportiva Joan Gamper
Collerense	(Balearic Islands) Palma	Municipal Coll d'en Rebassa
Espanyol	(Catalonia) Barcelona	Ciudad Deportiva
Fundación Albacete	(Castilla–La Mancha) Albacete	Ciudad Deportiva Andrés Iniesta
Levante	(Valencian Community) Valencia	Polideportiu Nazaret
Oviedo Moderno	(Asturias) Oviedo	Manuel Díaz Vega
Rayo Vallecano	Madrid	Ciudad Deportiva
Real Sociedad	(Basque Country (autonomous community)) San Sebastián	Zubieta
Sant Gabriel	(Catalonia) Sant Adrià de Besòs	José Luis Ruiz Casado
Santa Teresa	(Extremadura) Badajoz	La Granadilla
Sevilla	(Andalusia) Seville	Guadalquivir
Sporting Huelva	(Andalusia) Huelva	El Conquero
Transportes Alcaine	(Aragon) Zaragoza	Pedro Sancho
Valencia	(Valencian Community) Valencia	Paterna

== League table ==
Pos	Team	Pld	W	D	L	GF	GA	GD	Pts	Qualification or relegation
1	Barcelona (C)	30	25	2	3	93	9	+84	77	Qualification for UEFA Champions League and Copa de la Reina
2	Atlético Madrid	30	20	9	1	54	21	+33	69	Qualification for UEFA Champions League and Copa de la Reina
3	Athletic Bilbao	30	19	8	3	73	24	+49	65	Qualification for Copa de la Reina
4	Valencia	30	17	8	5	58	25	+33	59	Qualification for Copa de la Reina
5	Levante	30	15	10	5	60	25	+35	55	Qualification for Copa de la Reina
6	Rayo Vallecano	30	13	8	9	45	34	+11	47	Qualification for Copa de la Reina
7	Espanyol	30	12	7	11	50	54	−4	43	Qualification for Copa de la Reina
8	Sporting Huelva	30	11	8	11	51	55	−4	41	Qualification for Copa de la Reina
9	Santa Teresa	30	9	7	14	33	53	−20	34	
10	Oviedo Moderno	30	8	8	14	35	61	−26	32	
11	Real Sociedad	30	7	9	14	39	47	−8	30	
12	Collerense	30	7	4	19	32	65	−33	25	
13	Transportes Alcaine	30	5	10	15	27	53	−26	25	
14	Fundación Albacete	30	6	7	17	38	63	−25	25	
15	Sant Gabriel (R)	30	7	2	21	28	63	−35	23	Relegation to Segunda División
16	Sevilla (R)	30	4	3	23	27	91	−64	15	Relegation to Segunda División

Source: soccerway.com
Rules for classification: 1) points; 2) head-to-head points; 3) goal difference; 4) number of goals scored
(C) Champions; (R) Relegated

== Results ==
Home \ Away	ATH	ATM	BAR	COL	ESP	FUN	LEV	OVI	RVA	RSS	SGA	STE	SEV	SPO	TRA	VAL
Athletic Bilbao		0–0	1–0	6–0	7–1	4–2	1–1	3–0	0–0	2–1	2–0	3–0	7–0	5–1	3–1	1–0
Atlético Madrid	2–0		1–1	3–1	1–0	3–1	3–1	3–0	0–0	3–1	3–1	1–0	1–0	2–0	2–2	1–1
Barcelona	4–0	1–0		2–0	3–0	8–0	3–0	5–1	3–1	3–0	5–0	4–0	8–0	7–0	4–0	1–2
Collerense	0–1	0–0	0–1		1–2	2–1	2–2	1–2	1–4	1–4	2–2	2–1	3–0	2–3	0–1	2–1
Espanyol	1–1	0–1	0–4	5–2		2–1	1–0	4–0	2–0	2–2	2–0	4–0	2–1	4–2	2–2	0–5
Fundación Albacete	1–1	1–3	0–2	1–3	2–1		0–2	3–1	2–3	2–2	2–0	1–1	3–1	3–0	0–0	2–2
Levante	4–1	1–3	1–2	5–0	3–2	8–1		5–0	1–1	1–0	3–0	1–0	3–1	1–1	5–1	0–0
Oviedo Moderno	0–2	0–1	0–0	4–1	1–1	1–0	0–0		1–1	2–2	2–0	1–2	3–3	2–2	2–1	0–3
Rayo Vallecano	1–2	2–3	0–1	1–1	0–0	1–3	0–0	1–0		0–1	2–1	3–0	2–1	2–1	5–0	0–2
Real Sociedad	1–1	0–2	0–2	4–1	3–0	1–1	0–1	1–3	2–3		2–1	2–0	0–1	0–0	0–0	2–5
Sant Gabriel	1–4	1–3	0–3	1–0	2–4	2–0	0–3	3–0	1–3	0–1		2–0	3–0	2–6	1–1	1–3
Santa Teresa	0–3	2–2	0–4	1–0	1–1	3–2	0–0	2–3	3–1	3–3	2–0		3–1	2–0	1–3	1–0
Sevilla	0–8	1–1	0–3	0–1	2–2	1–0	0–5	5–2	1–5	2–1	0–2	2–3		0–5	0–1	1–3
Sporting Huelva	2–2	0–2	0–4	2–1	3–2	4–3	1–1	1–1	0–1	2–2	2–0	2–0	3–0		3–0	1–2
Transportes Alcaine	0–0	1–2	0–4	0–2	1–2	0–0	0–0	1–2	1–2	2–1	0–1	1–1	5–3	1–3		0–0
Valencia	0–2	2–2	2–1	5–0	3–1	1–0	1–2	4–1	0–0	1–0	3–0	1–1	3–0	1–1	2–1	

Source: soccerway.com
Legend: Blue = home team win; Yellow = draw; Red = away team win.

== Season statistics ==
=== Top scorers ===
Rank	Player	Club	Goals
1	Adriana Martín	Levante	22
1	Sonia Bermúdez	Barcelona	22
3	María Paz Vilas	Valencia	21
4	Priscila Borja	Atlético Madrid	17
4	Nekane Díez	Athletic Bilbao	17
4	Erika Vázquez	Athletic Bilbao	17
7	Carla Gómez	Sant Gabriel	14
8	Carolina Férez	Valencia	13
8	Joyce Magalhães	Sporting Huelva	13
10	Paloma Fernández	Espanyol	12
10	Esther González	Atlético Madrid	12

=== Best goalkeepers ===
Rank	Player	Club	Goals conceded	minutes played	Coefficient
1	Laura Ràfols	Barcelona	9	2518	1:279.78
2	Lola Gallardo	Atlético Madrid	18	2414	1:134.11
3	Mariajo Pons	Valencia	20	2159	1:107.95
4	Sandra Paños	Levante	25	2678	1:107.12
5	Ainhoa Tirapu	Athletic Bilbao	18	1710	1:95
6	Alicia Gómez	Rayo Vallecano	26	2250	1:86.54

=== Hat-tricks ===
Player	For	Against	Result	Round
Nekane Díez	Athletic Bilbao	Sporting Huelva	5–1 (h)	1
Brandi Vega	Oviedo Moderno	Real Sociedad	1–3 (a)	4
Sonia Bermúdez	Barcelona	Fundación Albacete	8–0 (h)	5
Patricia Martínez	Sporting Huelva	Sant Gabriel	2–6 (a)	5
Mari Paz Vilas^{4}	Valencia	Real Sociedad	2–5 (a)	6
Jennifer Hermoso	Barcelona	Oviedo Moderno	5–1 (h)	13*
Adriana Martín	Levante	Sant Gabriel	0–3 (a)	13*
Lucía García	Oviedo Moderno	Santa Teresa	2–3 (a)	8
Yulema Corres	Athletic Bilbao	Sant Gabriel	1–4 (a)	15
Sonia Bermúdez^{4}	Barcelona	Sevilla	8–0 (h)	27
Nekane Díez^{4}	Athletic Bilbao	Espanyol	7–1 (h)	28
Erika Vázquez	Athletic Bilbao	Espanyol	7–1 (h)	28
Paloma Fernández	Espanyol	Oviedo Moderno	4–0 (h)	29

^{4} Player scored 4 goals

== Signings ==
Team	Goalkeepers	Defenders	Midfielders	Forwards
Alcaine Zaragoza			(Basque Country (autonomous community)) Silvia Ruiz (Athletic Bilbao)	(Portugal) Ritinha Oliveira (Leixões)
Athletic Bilbao			(Basque Country (autonomous community)) Maite Lizaso (Real Sociedad)	(Basque Country (autonomous community)) Yulema Corres (Aurrerá)
Atlético Madrid		(Andalusia) Rocío Gálvez (Betis) (Melilla) Vanesa García (Rayo Vallecano) (Aragon) Mapi León (Espanyol)	(Portugal) Rita Fontemanha (Boavista) (Catalonia) Brenda Pérez (Sant Gabriel) (Andalusia) Ángela Sosa (Sporting Huelva)	(Andalusia) Priscila Borja (Rayo Vallecano) (Castile and León) Sandra Sánchez (Parquesol)
Barcelona		(Basque Country (autonomous community)) Leire Landa (Athletic Bilbao)	(Balearic Islands) Mariona Caldentey (Collerense) (Canary Islands) Sandra Hernández (Sant Gabriel)	(Catalonia) Cristina Baudet (Sant Gabriel)
Collerense			(Balearic Islands) Isabel Calero (CE Sant Gabriel) MF (Balearic Islands) Estefanía Rodríguez (RCD Mallorca) MF	
Espanyol	(Catalonia) Irina Torrent (Lloret)	(Catalonia) María Estella Del Valle (Sant Gabriel) (Balearic Islands) Inés Juan (Levante Las Planas) (Andalusia) Estíbaliz Torralbo (Granada)	(Mexico) Kenti Robles (Barcelona) (Catalonia) Sandra Vilanova (Andalusia) Ana Troyano (Atlético Madrid)	(Andalusia) Noelia Aybar (Granada) (Galicia (Spain)) Anair Lomba (El Olivo)
Fundación Albacete	(Castilla–La Mancha) Elena de Toro (La Solana)		(Castilla–La Mancha) "Leles" Carrión (CFF Albacete) (Region of Murcia) Jessica Tébar (Murcia Féminas)	(Cantabria) Elisa Del Estal (SD Reocín)
Levante			(Valencian Community) Aila Fuster (Sporting Plaza de Argel) MF	(Aragon) Adriana Martín (Western New York Flash) FW
Oviedo Moderno	(Asturias) Ana Vallés (Mareo)			(United States) Brandi Vega (Bay Area Breeze)
Rayo Vallecano		(Community of Madrid) Patricia Gudiel (Atlético Madrid)		(Equatorial Guinea) Jade Boho (Atlético Madrid) (Japan) Marika Ohshima (Waseda University)
Real Sociedad	(Basque Country (autonomous community)) Marisun Quiñones (Mariño)		(Navarre) María Díaz Cirauqui (Alcaine) (Community of Madrid) Cristina Pizarro (Sant Gabriel)	
Sant Gabriel		(Catalonia) Cristina Becerra (Espanyol) (Catalonia) Marta Muriana (AEM Lleida) (Catalonia) Marta Turmo (Barcelona B)	(Catalonia) Carola García (Barcelona B)	(Catalonia) Gloria Pelegrí (AEM Lleida) (Japan) Asako Sakurabayashi (Levante LP)
Santa Teresa	(Catalonia) Alba Moreno (Barcelona B)	(Aragon) Laura Folch (Alcaine) (Castilla–La Mancha) Paula López (Atlético Madrid) (Castile and León) María Neira (Salamanca)	(Cantabria) Sara Del Estal (SD Reocín) (Israel) Diana Redman (Pali Blues) (Extremadura) Carmen Menayo (Puebla) (Portugal) Fátima Pinto (Atlético Ouriense) (Extremadura) Marta Rubio (Badajoz-Olivenza)	(Andalusia) Mireya García Boa (Sevilla)
Sevilla	(Mexico) Pamela Tajonar (WNY Flash)	(Andalusia) Lorena Bocanegra (Città di Sora) (Andalusia) Eva Castaño (Anderlecht) (Andalusia) Alicia Fuentes (Levante Las Planas)	(Andalusia) Elena Escudero (Híspalis) (Romania) Olivia Oprea (Costa Adeje) (Andalusia) Rocío Mateos (Granada)	
Sporting Huelva	(Andalusia) Nazaret Lara (Betis)	(Community of Madrid) Emmna Marqués (Espanyol) (Andalusia) Paula Perea (Sevilla)	(Brazil) Joyce Magalhães (Rayo Vallecano)	(Castile and León) Patricia Martínez (Ponferrada)
Valencia		(Catalonia) Paula Nicart (Sant Gabriel)	(Basque Country (autonomous community)) Naiara Beristain (Real Sociedad) (Catalonia) Carol Férez (Barcelona) (Community of Madrid) Claudia Zornoza (Atlético Madrid)	(Catalonia) Manuela Lareo (Athletic Bilbao)

== See also ==
- Royal Spanish Football Federation
