= Lorena Bocanegra =

Spanish footballer

Personal information
- Full name: Lorena Bocanegra Sánchez
- Date of birth: 4 May 1993 (age 33)
- Place of birth: Seville, Spain
- Height: 1.64 m (5 ft 5 in)
- Positions: Defender; midfielder

Senior career*
Years	Team	Apps	(Gls)
2009–2011	Sevilla		
2011–2013	Sporting de Huelva		
2013	Carmelitas		
2014–2015	Sevilla	13	(1)
- * Club domestic league appearances and goals

Lorena Bocanegra Sánchez (born 4 May 1993) is a Spanish futsal player and former footballer who played primarily as a midfielder.

== Football career ==
Bocanegra, a midfielder, played for Sevilla, Sporting de Huelva and Carmelitas during her football career. She first started playing football at the age of six. At the age of 18, she was invited to train with the Spain women's national under-19 squad at La Ciudad del Fútbol.

== Futsal career ==
Città di Sora e Ceprano, playing in the highest tier in Italy, was the first futsal club that Bocanegra played for. Whilst she was provided with accommodation and free meals, the lack of a formal contract caused her to leave and she signed for Spanish futsal club Guadalcacín, who played in the Primera División Femenina de Futsal, the highest tier of women's futsal in the country. Bocanegra, who at this point was captain of the club, had to undergo surgery after injuring her knee in the opening day of the 2018–19 season, which subsequently caused her to miss the majority of the season. In July 2019, following the club's relegation to the Segunda División, she renewed her contract with Guadalcacín. Polideportivo Cádiz, in January 2021, submitted a complaint to the Royal Spanish Football Federation due to Bocanegra playing in a match on 3 January, despite not being properly registered to play in that match. Guadalcacín were given ten days to respond to this.

== Personal life ==
Bocanegra's partner, Desiré López, a native of Málaga, is a futsal player. They met while Bocanegra was playing at Sporting de Huelva and López was at Atlético Torcal de Málaga. Bocanegra proposed to López after a futsal match in March 2018. The gesture was in front of teammates and relatives of the players.
