= Anabel Martínez =

Spanish footballer (born 1992)

Personal information
- Full name: Anabel Martínez Castillo
- Date of birth: 26 June 1992 (age 34)
- Place of birth: Valencia, Spain
- Height: 1.71 m (5 ft 7 in)
- Position: Defender

Senior career*
Years	Team	Apps	(Gls)
2007–2014	Levante	52	(4)
2014–2018	Mislata		
2019–	Alzira		
- * Club domestic league appearances and goals

Anabel Martínez Castillo (born 26 June 1992) is a Spanish football defender, currently playing for Alzira.

== Career ==
Martínez started playing football at the age of 11 with friends in Llombai. By the age of 12, she had joined Levante. At club level, Martínez has represented Levante, Mislata and Alzira. At international level, she was the captain of the Spain under-17 team in the 2009 U-17 European Championship.

Martínez most often operates as a centre-back but does sometimes play as a left-back.
