= Elena de Toro =

Spanish footballer (born 1997)

Personal information
- Full name: Elena de Toro Aldaria
- Date of birth: 31 January 1997 (age 29)
- Place of birth: Bolaños de Calatrava, Spain
- Height: 1.69 m (5 ft 7 in)
- Position: Goalkeeper

Team information
- Current team: Alhama CF
- Number: 1

Senior career*
| Years | Team | Apps | (Gls) |
| 2010–2012 | La Solana B | | |
| 2011–2014 | La Solana | | |
| 2014–2020 | Fundación Albacete | 134 | (0) |
| 2020–2024 | Villarreal | 69 | (0) |
| 2024– | Alhama CF | 18 | (0) |

International career
| 2013–2014 | Spain U17 | 12 | (0) |
| 2014–2015 | Spain U19 | 8 | (0) |
- * Club domestic league appearances and goals as of 13:15, 17 April 2022 (UTC)

Elena de Toro Aldaria (born 31 January 1997) is a Spanish professional footballer who plays as a goalkeeper for Liga F club Alhama CF.

== Club career ==
De Toro started her career at La Solana B.
