= Leire Landa =

Spanish footballer (born 1986)

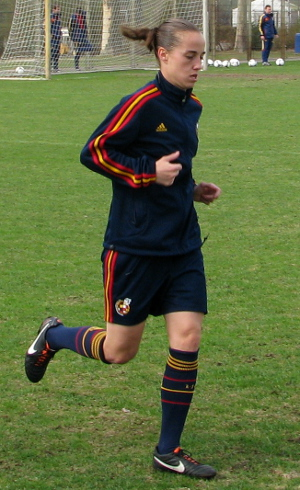

Personal information
- Full name: Leire Landa Iroz
- Date of birth: 19 December 1986 (age 39)
- Place of birth: Irun, Spain
- Height: 1.66 m (5 ft 5 1/2 in)
- Position: Defender

Senior career*
Years	Team	Apps	(Gls)
2001–2002	Oiartzun KE		
2004–2009	Real Sociedad	72+	(4+)
2009–2012	Atlético Madrid	67	(2)
2012–2014	Athletic Club	55	(0)
2014–2017	FC Barcelona	31	(0)

International career
2011–2015	Spain	26	(0)
2008–2017	Basque Country	3	(0)
- * Club domestic league appearances and goals

Leire Landa Iroz (born 19 December 1986) is a Spanish former footballer who most recently played as a defender for Primera División club FC Barcelona and the Spain women's national football team. She also played for Real Sociedad, Atlético Madrid and Athletic Bilbao.

== International career ==
In June 2013 national team coach Ignacio Quereda selected Landa in the Spain squad for UEFA Women's Euro 2013 in Sweden. She was also part of Spain's team at the 2015 FIFA Women's World Cup in Canada.

== Personal ==
She wore the 23 shirt at Atlético in homage to former footballer Iván de la Peña, well known for his shaved head, who was an inspirational model when she suffered from Burkitt's lymphoma as a child.

== Honours ==
Barcelona

- Primera División: 2014–15

Athletic Bilbao

- Copa de la Reina: runner-up 2014
