= Nekane Díez =

Spanish footballer (born 1991)

Nekane
Personal information
- Full name: Nekane Díez Tapia
- Date of birth: 13 August 1991 (age 35)
- Place of birth: Barakaldo, Spain
- Height: 1.69 m (5 ft 7 in)
- Position: Striker

Senior career*
Years	Team	Apps	(Gls)
2006–2007	Marino		
2007–2023	Athletic Bilbao	348	(148)

International career
- Spain U19
2008–2017	Basque Country	7	(2)
- * Club domestic league appearances and goals

Nekane Díez Tapia (born 13 August 1991) is a Spanish former football striker who played mainly for Athletic Bilbao in Spain's Primera División.

Nekane made her debut for Athletic in a 4–0 win over ŽNK Krka in the 2007–08 UEFA Women's Cup a few days before her 16th birthday – she found the net in the match, and as of 2023 remained the club's youngest player and goalscorer. She was the third top scorer of the 2010–11 season with 24 goals.

In December 2015 she suffered an anterior cruciate ligament injury while playing for the Basque Country against Catalonia. Despite her absence, Athletic won the league title that season.

Nekane made a recovery from injury, although her contribution reduced over subsequent seasons. She left Athletic and ended her playing career in 2023, aged 31, having scored total of 162 goals in 381 appearances for the club (second and fourth respectively in their historical rankings).

== Honours ==
Athletic Bilbao

- Primera División: 2015–16
- Copa de la Reina de Fútbol: Runner-up 2012, 2014
