= Laura Gómez (footballer) =

Spanish footballer (born 1983)

Personal information
- Full name: Laura Gómez Gutiérrez
- Place of birth: Zarautz, Spain
- Position: Defender

Senior career*
Years	Team	Apps	(Gls)
2002–2008	Real Sociedad		
2008–2015	FC Barcelona		
- * Club domestic league appearances and goals

Laura Gómez Gutiérrez is a retired Spanish football defender who played for Sporting de Huelva. Gomez was often called the female Carlos Puyol.

== Honours ==
=== Club ===
Barcelona

- Primera División: 2013–14, 2014–15
- Copa de la Reina: 2014
