= Núria Garrote =

Spanish footballer (born 1997)

Personal information
- Full name: Nuria Garrote Camúñez
- Date of birth: 10 June 1997 (age 29)
- Place of birth: Barcelona, Spain
- Height: 1.60 m (5 ft 3 in)
- Position: Defender

Team information
- Current team: Levante Badalona

Senior career*
Years	Team	Apps	(Gls)
- Levante Badalona
- * Club domestic league appearances and goals

Nuria Garrote Camúñez (born 10 June 1997) is a Spanish footballer who plays as a defender for Liga F club Levante Badalona. Her twin sister Pilar is also a footballer.
