= Sonia Bermúdez (footballer) =

Spanish international footballer

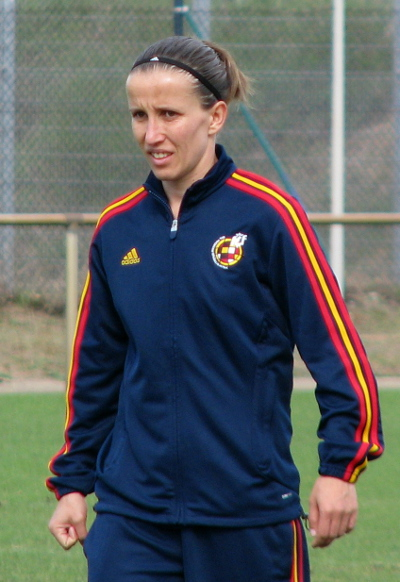
- Bermúdez in 2012

Personal information
- Full name: Sonia Bermúdez Tribano
- Date of birth: 15 November 1984 (age 41)
- Place of birth: Madrid, Spain
- Height: 1.58 m (5 ft 2 in)
- Position: Forward

Team information
- Current team: Spain (Head Coach)

Youth career
- Butarque

Senior career*
Years	Team	Apps	(Gls)
- Pozuelo
2002–2003	Estudiantes Huelva		
2003–2004	Sabadell		
2004–2011	Rayo Vallecano	101+	(68+)
2011–2014	Barcelona	87	(85)
2014	Western New York Flash	21	(4)
2014–2015	Barcelona	28	(22)
2015–2018	Atlético Madrid	86	(72)
2018–2020	Levante	43	(7)

International career
2001–2003	Spain U19		
2008–2017	Spain	61	(34)

Managerial career
- 2022–2024: Spain U19
- 2022–2024: Spain U20
- 2024–2025: Spain U23
- 2025–: Spain
Medal record
Women's football
Representing Spain (as manager)
UEFA Women's Under-19 Championship
Winner	2023 Belgium
Winner	2024 Lithuania
- * Club domestic league appearances and goals

Sonia Bermúdez Tribano (born 15 November 1984), commonly known as Sonia or Soni, is a Spanish football manager and former footballer who is currently the head coach of the Spain women's national team.

In her playing career, Bermúdez began at her local club Rayo Vallecano, where she captured three consecutive league titles. She then joined FC Barcelona, adding four more successive league championships to her record, with a brief spell at NWSL side Western New York Flash in between. Bermúdez later enjoyed further success with Atlético Madrid before concluding her career at Levante.

After retiring in 2020, Bermúdez began her coaching career with the U19 and U20 women's teams of Spain during which she won back-to-back Under-19 Championships in 2023 and 2024. In 2025, she became the national coach of the Spain women's senior team.

== Playing career ==
She played for Estudiantes Huelva before joining CE Sabadell in 2003.

In seven years with Rayo Vallecano, she contributed to the club's first Spanish league trophy—scoring 22 goals throughout the 2008–09 season, ranking third at the top scorers table.

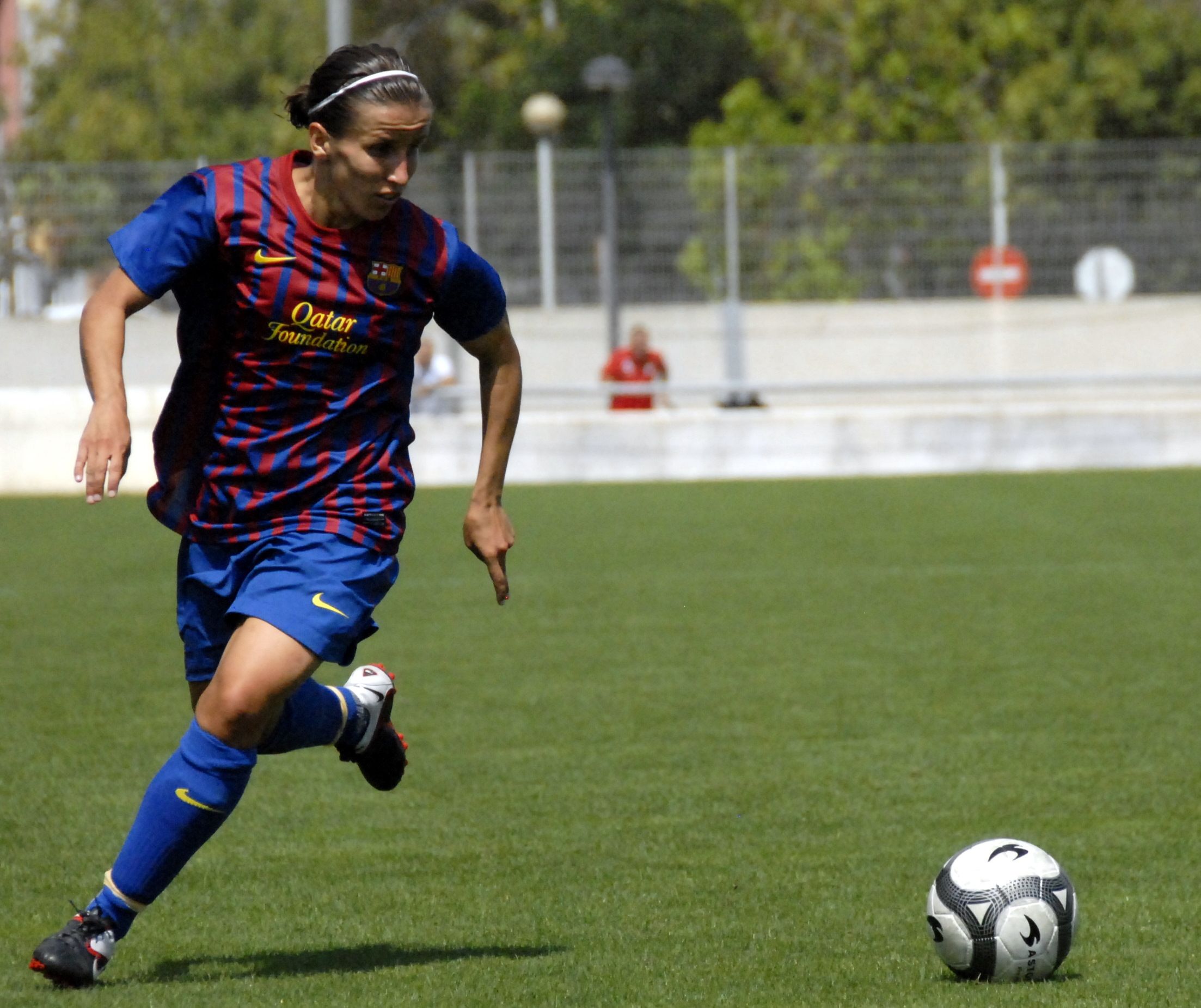
Bermúdez playing for Barcelona.

She won the 2011–12 Primera División top scorer award with 38 goals for champions Barcelona. In 2012–13 Barcelona retained their title and Sonia scored 21 times to finish joint-top scorer with Rayo's Natalia Pablos. In 2014, she had a quick break at her Barcelona career when she joined the Western New York Flash from NWSL, returning to Barcelona for the 2014–15 season.

In 2015, after four seasons at Barcelona – which included a stint in 2014 with the Western New York Flash from NWSL – she opted to join Atlético Madrid ahead of the 2015–16 season.

== International career ==
In October 2002, Bermúdez was named to the Spanish squad for the 2003 UEFA Women's Under-19 Championship.

A member of the senior Spanish national team, she scored against England and Northern Ireland at the UEFA Women's Euro 2009 qualifying. In Spain's first game of the UEFA Women's Euro 2013 qualifying campaign, Bermúdez was named to the squad and listed as an FC Barcelona player. She scored the fourth goal in Spain's 10–1 win in Turkey.

In June 2013, national team coach Ignacio Quereda named Bermúdez in his squad for the UEFA Women's Euro 2013 finals in Sweden.

She was part of Spain's squad at the 2015 FIFA Women's World Cup in Canada.

== Managerial career ==
=== Spain Women's U19 and Spain Women's U20 ===
In 2022, following her retirement as a player, Bermúdez became head coach of both the Spain U-19 side and the U-20 side. She achieved considerable success with the U-19 who won back-to-back UEFA Women’s Under-19 Championships in 2023 and 2024 under her leadership.

Her U-20 tenure was more mixed. While her U-20 team competed, they were unable to capture a world title; in the 2024 U-20 Women’s World Cup, Spain exited at the quarter-final stage after a defeat to Japan.

=== Spain Women's U23 ===
In September 2024, Bermúdez was appointed head coach of the Spain U-23 side, overseeing nine matches and securing five victories.

Because of her strong record at youth international level — especially the consecutive U-19 European titles — Bermúdez’s performance is widely seen as having enhanced her credentials, eventually leading to her appointment as manager of the senior Spain women’s national team in 2025.

=== Spain Women ===
In August 2025, the Royal Spanish Football Federation announced that Bermúdez had signed a two-year contract and would take over from Montse Tomé as manager of the Spain women's national football team, starting in October 2025.

== International goals ==
No.	Date	Venue	Opponent	Score	Result	Competition
1.	16 February 2008	Aranda de Duero, Spain	Northern Ireland	2–0	4–0	UEFA Women's Euro 2009 qualifying
2.	2 October 2008	Zamora, Spain	England	2–0	2–2	UEFA Women's Euro 2009 qualifying
3.	19 September 2009	Ta'Qali, Malta	Malta	4–0	13–0	2011 FIFA Women's World Cup qualification
4.	19 September 2009	Ta'Qali, Malta	Malta	7–0	13–0	2011 FIFA Women's World Cup qualification
5.	19 September 2009	Ta'Qali, Malta	Malta	8–0	13–0	2011 FIFA Women's World Cup qualification
6.	24 October 2009	Córdoba, Spain	Austria	1–0	2–0	2011 FIFA Women's World Cup qualification
7.	21 November 2009	Manisa, Turkey	Turkey	4–0	5–0	2011 FIFA Women's World Cup qualification
8.	7 April 2010	Guadalajara, Spain	Turkey	1–0	5–1	2011 FIFA Women's World Cup qualification
9.	19 June 2010	Aranda de Duero, Spain	England	2–0	2–2	2011 FIFA Women's World Cup qualification
10.	17 September 2011	istanbul, Turkey	Turkey	4–1	10–1	UEFA Women's Euro 2013 qualifying
11.	27 October 2011	Shymkent, Kazakhstan	Kazakhstan	1–0	4–0	UEFA Women's Euro 2013 qualifying
12.	27 October 2011	Shymkent, Kazakhstan	Kazakhstan	3–0	4–0	UEFA Women's Euro 2013 qualifying
13.	20 November 2011	Buftea, Romania	Romania	1–0	4–0	UEFA Women's Euro 2013 qualifying
14.	15 February 2012	Santiago de Compostela, Spain	Austria	1–1	4–1	Friendly
15.	5 April 2012	Las Rozas de Madrid, Spain	Kazakhstan	2–0	13–0	UEFA Women's Euro 2013 qualifying
16.	21 June 2012	Las Rozas de Madrid, Spain	Turkey	1–0	4–0	UEFA Women's Euro 2013 qualifying
17.	27 October 2013	Collado Villalba, Spain	Estonia	1–0	6–0	2015 FIFA Women's World Cup qualification
18.	27 October 2013	Collado Villalba, Spain	Estonia	4–0	6–0	2015 FIFA Women's World Cup qualification
19.	31 October 2013	San Sebastián de los Reyes, Spain	Italy	1–0	2–0	2015 FIFA Women's World Cup qualification
20.	27 November 2013	Fuenlabrada, Spain	Czech Republic	1–0	3–2	2015 FIFA Women's World Cup qualification
21.	27 November 2013	Fuenlabrada, Spain	Czech Republic	2–0	3–2	2015 FIFA Women's World Cup qualification
22.	13 February 2014	Logroño, Spain	North Macedonia	2–0	12–0	2015 FIFA Women's World Cup qualification
23.	13 February 2014	Logroño, Spain	North Macedonia	5–0	12–0	2015 FIFA Women's World Cup qualification
24.	24 April 2014	Skopje, North Macedonia	North Macedonia	1–0	10–0	2015 FIFA Women's World Cup qualification
25.	24 April 2014	Skopje, North Macedonia	North Macedonia	2–0	10–0	2015 FIFA Women's World Cup qualification
26.	24 April 2014	Skopje, North Macedonia	North Macedonia	6–0	10–0	2015 FIFA Women's World Cup qualification
27.	11 February 2015	San Pedro del Pinatar, Spain	Belgium	2–1	2–1	Friendly
28.	3 March 2015	La Roda, Spain	New Zealand	2–0	2–2	Friendly
29.	1 December 2015	Badajoz, Spain	Portugal	2–0	2–0	UEFA Women's Euro 2017 qualifying
30.	15 September 2016	Las Rozas de Madrid, Spain	Montenegro	3–0	13–0	UEFA Women's Euro 2017 qualifying
31.	15 September 2016	Las Rozas de Madrid, Spain	Montenegro	5–0	13–0	UEFA Women's Euro 2017 qualifying
32.	15 September 2016	Las Rozas de Madrid, Spain	Montenegro	6–0	13–0	UEFA Women's Euro 2017 qualifying
33.	15 September 2016	Las Rozas de Madrid, Spain	Montenegro	10–0	13–0	UEFA Women's Euro 2017 qualifying
34.	15 September 2016	Las Rozas de Madrid, Spain	Montenegro	13–0	13–0	UEFA Women's Euro 2017 qualifying

== Honours ==
=== Player ===
Rayo Vallecano

- Primera División: 2008–09, 2009–10, 2010–11
- Copa de la Reina de Fútbol: 2008

FC Barcelona

- Primera División: 2011–12, 2012–13, 2013–14, 2014–15
- Copa de la Reina de Fútbol: 2013, 2014

Atlético Madrid

- Primera División: 2016-17, 2017-18
- Copa de la Reina de Fútbol: 2016

Spain

- Algarve Cup: 2017

=== Managerial ===
Spain Women

- UEFA Women's Nations League: 2025

Spain U19

- UEFA Women's Under-19 Championship: 2023, 2024
