= Ciutat Esportiva Joan Gamper =

Base of FC Barcelona

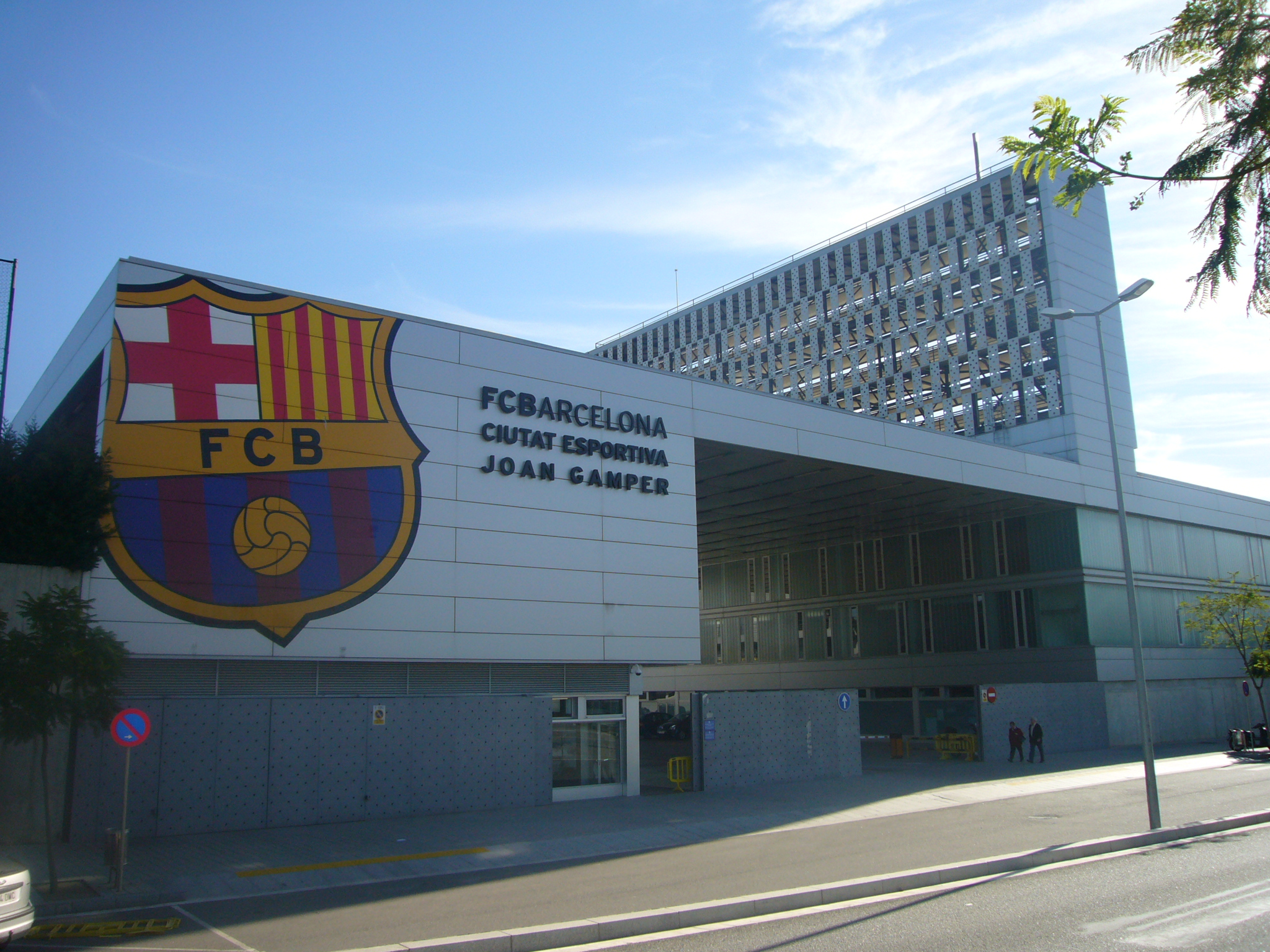
- Main entrance, with the multi-sport pavilion at the right side
- Interactive map of Ciutat Esportiva Joan Gamper
- Location: Sant Joan Despí; Barcelona
- Coordinates: 41°22′33″N 02°03′08″E
- Owner: FC Barcelona
- Type: Football training ground

Construction
- Opened: 2006
- Cost: €77.5 million

Tenant
- FC Barcelona (training) (2006-)

Website
- C.E. Joan Gamper

The Ciutat Esportiva Joan Gamper (Catalan pronunciation: [siwˈtat əspuɾˈtiβə ʒuˈaŋ ˈɡampəɾ]) is the training ground and academy base of Spanish football club FC Barcelona. It was officially opened on 1 June 2006, and was named in honor of Joan Gamper, founder of the club.

Located in Sant Joan Despí (Baix Llobregat, Province of Barcelona) to the west of central Barcelona and north of the city's airport, and covering 163.650 m^{2}, it is used since 2006 for youth team training and matches and since January 2009 for the first team training. It is also used by many of the other sports teams at the club including Basketball, Handball and Futsal who use facilities such as the multi-sports pavilion. Now that this facility is fully operational, all the youth teams that previously used the Camp Nou facilities, mainly the Mini Estadi and the Palau Blaugrana, train there. In 2019, the Johan Cruyff Stadium opened next to the Ciutat Esportiva to replace the Mini Estadi as a matchday venue for Barcelona B and Barcelona Femení.

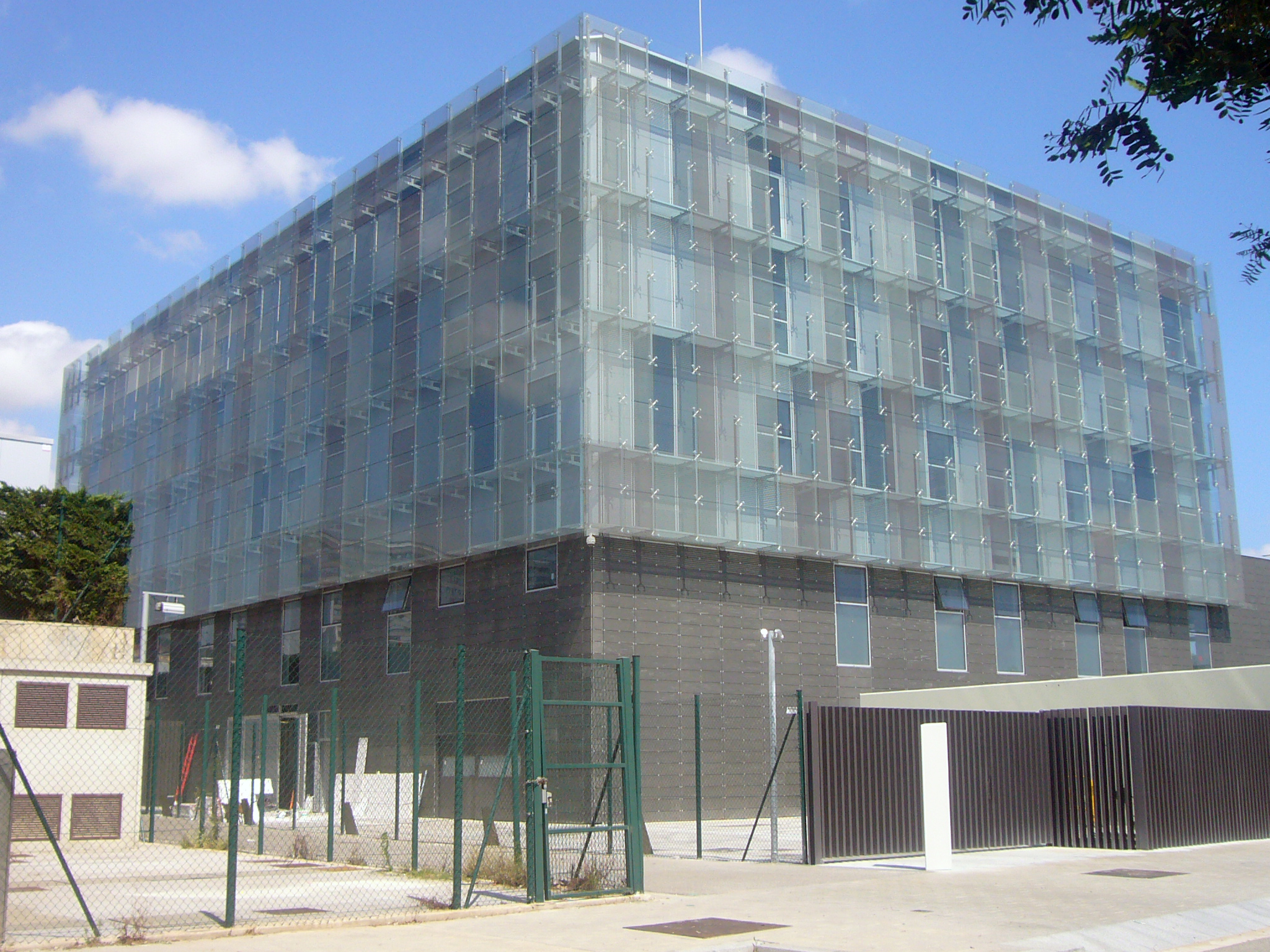
The new Masia, residence opened in 2011 on the site.

FC Barcelona's first team moved to this facility on 19 January 2009. This brought to an end a 30-year history that the first team had of training on the small pitch (known as the La Masia pitch) annexed to the Camp Nou. The first team facilities are the same as those at the Camp Nou and at the start of the 2009/2010 season it included a full pool and saunas for player recuperation.

By 2011 a new residence was opened on site, housing the FC Barcelona's youth players who previously boarded at La Masia. This will include living space for around 85 players.

The land occupied by the Ciutat Esportiva was purchased by the club in 1989 and is just 4.5 km away from the Camp Nou and is directly connected by the road between Barcelona and Sant Joan Despí.

The Ciutat Esportiva eventually cost 68 million euros, of which 25.6 corresponded to urbanization and 42.5 to the total construction costs. The club sold two plots of land, the first on 21 June 2002 and the second on 20 February 2003, for values of 29.7 and 15.9 million euros, respectively to cover part of the costs of the operation. The rest of the money was invested directly by the club, an amount of 22.5 million euros.

== Facilities ==
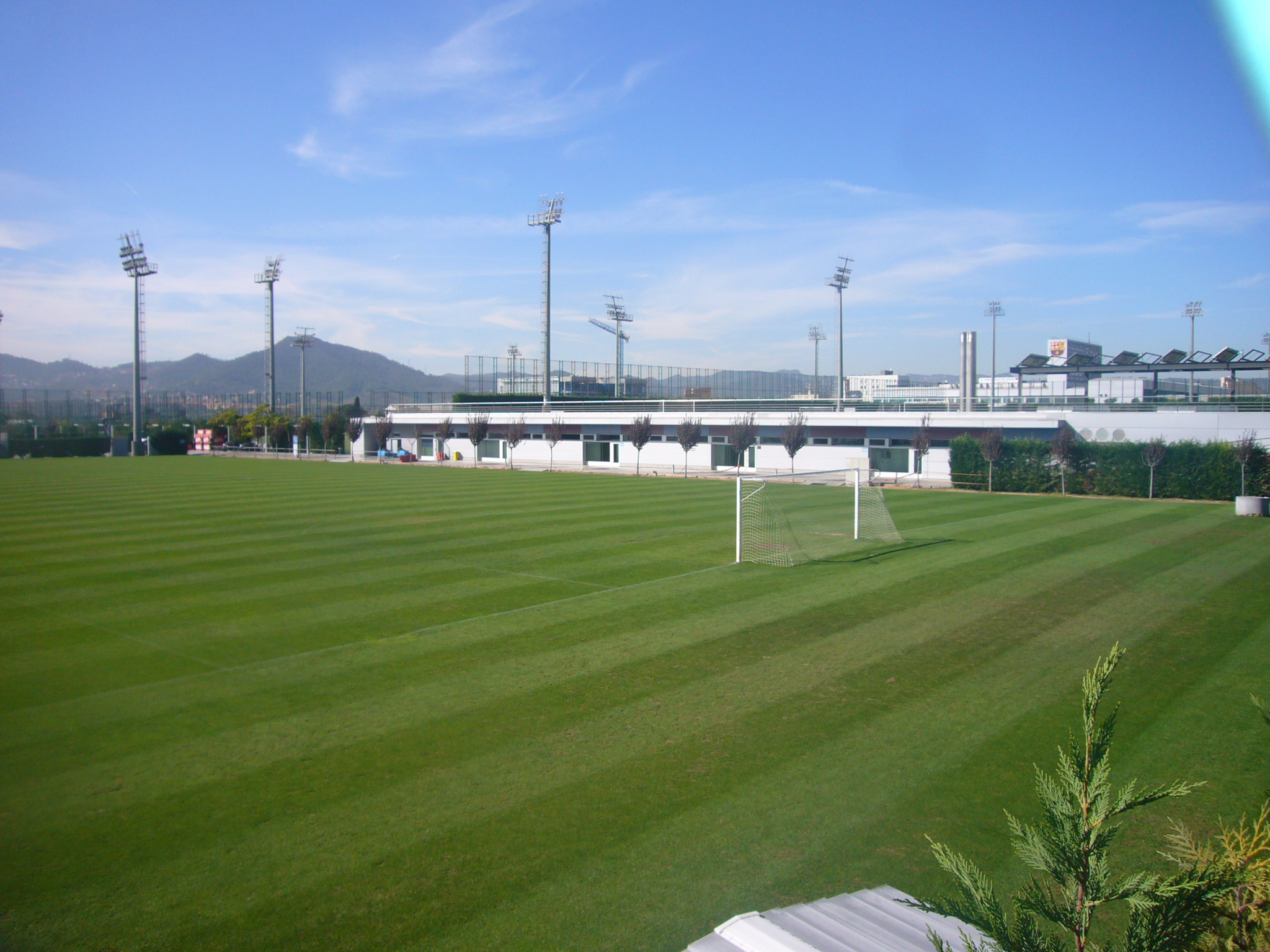
Grass pitch, number 4

- 5 natural grass football pitches.

* Pitch 7: (105 x 68 metres) with capacity for 1,750 spectators approximately.
* Pitch 1: (105 x 68 metres) with capacity for 1,400 spectators approximately.
* Pitch 2: (105 x 65 metres) with capacity for 400 spectators approximately.
* Pitch 3: (105 x 65 metres)
* Pitch 4: (105 x 65 metres)

- 4 Fieldturf pitches (3 regular-sized and 1 mini-football pitch).

* Pitch 8: (105 x 65 metres) with capacity for 950 spectators approximately.
* Pitch 5: (105 x 65 metres)
* Pitch 9: (105 x 65 metres)
* Pitch 6: (55 x 38 metres)

- 3 multi-sport pavilion (basketball, handball and futsal) with capacity for 472 spectators.
- 1 grandstand building by pitch 1.
- 1 service building (including team catering areas).
- 3 Gymnasiums.
- 2 Press Areas.
- 4 First Aid areas.
- 1 dressing room building.
- Different training areas for goalkeepers and technical aspects.
- 2011 saw the construction of the new La Masia building to house all of FC Barcelona's youth teams, it can also be used by first team and national teams for training camps.
- In 2012, FieldTurf Poligras (Iberica division of FieldTurf) which has been working with Barcelona for 20 years installed 4 of its latest state-of-the-art FieldTurf Optimum 63 solution in the Ciutat Esportiva Joan Gamper featuring durable fibres surrounded by a patented mixture of silica sand and cryogenic rubber infill material.
- A pool and saunas area built for recuperation of injuries.
