= Sandra Hernández =

Spanish footballer (born 1997)

Personal information
- Full name: Sandra Hernández Rodríguez
- Date of birth: 25 May 1997 (age 29)
- Place of birth: Santa Cruz de La Palma, Spain
- Height: 1.66 m (5 ft 5 in)
- Position: Midfielder

Youth career
- 2012–2014: Sant Gabriel
- 2014–2015: Barcelona

Senior career*
Years	Team	Apps	(Gls)
2012–2014	Sant Gabriel	29	(5)
2014–2017	Barcelona	28	(5)
2017–2021	Valencia	104	(6)
2021–2024	Granadilla	57	(1)
2024–2025	UD Tenerife B	15	(0)

International career
2013–2014	Spain U17	9	(4)
2015–2016	Spain U19	16	(8)
2016	Spain U20	3	(0)
2018–	Spain	6	(1)
- * Club domestic league appearances and goals as of 7 January 2025

Sandra Hernández Rodríguez (born 25 May 1997) is a Spanish professional footballer who plays as a midfielder.

== Club career ==
=== Barcelona ===
As a youngster Hernández played futsal with both boys and girls before joining Sant Gabriel at the age of fifteen. Two years later she joined Barcelona's famed La Masia academy. She later debuted in the 2013–14 season and represented the club in the UEFA Women's Champions League. Hernández later went on to claim winners' medals in the Primera División, Supercopa de Catalunya and Copa de la Reina before joining Valencia in 2017.

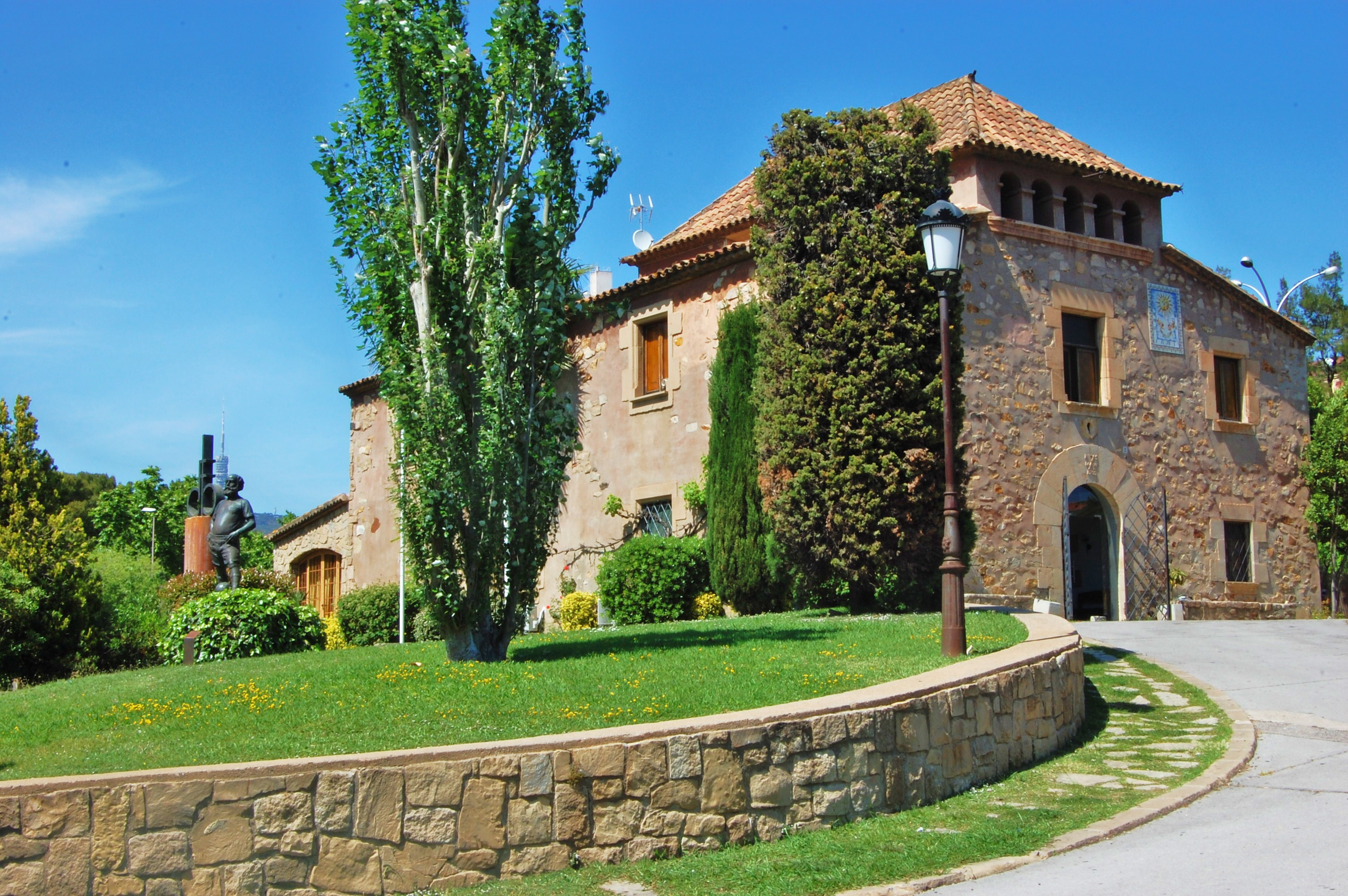
Hernández enrolled at Barcelona's youth academy, La Masia, at age 17

=== Valencia ===
On 4 July 2017, Hernández signed a two-year deal with Valencia.

== International career ==
In 2016, Hernández was part of the Spain squad who took part in the UEFA Women's Under-19 Championship where they ended as runners-up to France. She netted a hat-trick in Spain's thrilling 4–3 semi-final victory over the Netherlands and ended as the tournament's top goal scorer with five goals to her name. Hernández was also previously part of the Spain squads which ended as runners-up in the UEFA Women's Under-17 Championship, FIFA U-17 Women's World Cup and the previous year's UEFA Women's Under-19 Championship.

== Personal life ==
Hernández hails from a footballing family. Her father, Felipe "Tata" Hernández, represented Tenerife and Real Betis, amongst others, during his career.

== Honours ==
=== Club ===
Barcelona

- Primera División:2014–15
- Supercopa de Catalunya: 2016
- Copa de la Reina:2016–17

=== International ===
Spain

- Cyprus Cup: Winner, 2018
