= 2015–16 FC Barcelona Femení season =

Barcelona Femení
2015–16 season
- Head coach: Xavi Llorens
- Home ground: Mini Estadi / Ciutat Esportiva Joan Gamper
- Primera División: 2nd
- Copa de la Reina: Runners-up
- Copa Catalunya: Winners
- UEFA Champions League: Quarter-finals
- Top goalscorer: League: Jenni Hermoso (24); All: Jenni Hermoso (29)
- Biggest win: Home: Barcelona 8–0 Oviedo Moderno; Away: Fundación Albacete 0–10 Barcelona
- Biggest defeat: Barcelona 0–1 Atlético Madrid
Home colours

The 2015–16 season was the 28th season in the history of FC Barcelona Femení.

== Players ==
=== First team ===
No.	Pos.	Nat.	Name	Age	Since	App.	Goals
Goalkeepers
1	GK	(Spain)	Laura Ràfols (co-captain)	25	2007		0
13	GK	(Spain)	Sandra Paños	23	2015	26	0
Defenders
5	DF	(Spain)	Melanie Serrano (fifth captain)	26	2003		
4	DF	(Spain)	Marta Unzué (co-captain)	27	2006		
6	DF	(Spain)	Esther Romero	28	2006		
3	DF	(Spain)	Ruth García (third captain)	29	2013	117	11
17	DF	(Spain)	Núria Garrote	19	2013	24	1
23	DF	(Spain)	Leire Landa	29	2014	38	0
2	DF	(Spain)	Ane Bergara	29	2015	41	3
Midfielders
8	MF	(Spain)	Míriam Diéguez (sixth captain)	30	2011		
7	MF	(Spain)	Gemma Gili	22	2012		
18	MF	(Spain)	Marta Torrejón	26	2013	119	8
16	MF	(Spain)	Pilar Garrote	19	2013	5	3
14	MF	(Spain)	Cristina Baudet	24	2014	25	6
15	MF	(Spain)	Sandra Hernández	19	2014	32	7
24	MF	(Spain)	Irene del Río	24	2015	27	6
12	MF	(Spain)	Patricia Guijarro	18	2015	33	9
Forwards
20	FW	(Spain)	Olga García	24	2010		
11	FW	(Spain)	Alexia Putellas (fourth captain)	22	2012		
10	FW	(Spain)	Jenni Hermoso	26	2013	84	47
19	FW	(Spain)	Andrea Falcón	19	2013	19	0
9	FW	(Spain)	Mariona Caldentey	20	2014	43	14
21	FW	(Spain)	Bárbara Latorre	23	2015	35	16
22	FW	(Portugal)	Andreia Norton	19	2015	0	0

- Source: FCBarcelona.com
- Ordered by arrival.

=== Reserve team ===
Note: Flags indicate national team as defined under FIFA eligibility rules; some limited exceptions apply. Players may hold more than one non-FIFA nationality.

No.	Pos.	Nation	Player
25	GK	USA	Kaeli Schmidt
—	DF	ESP	Berta Pujadas
—	DF	ESP	Ona Batlle
—	DF	ESP	Laia Aleixandri
28	MF	ESP	Aitana Bonmatí
—	MF	ESP	Nerea Valeriano
—	MF	ESP	Laura Martínez

== Transfers ==
=== In ===
No.	Pos.	Nat.	Player	Moving from	Type	Source
Summer
2	DF	(Spain)	Ane Bergara	Real Sociedad	Transfer	
12	MF	(Spain)	Patricia Guijarro	Collerense	Transfer	
13	GK	(Spain)	Sandra Paños	Levante	Transfer	
20	FW	(Spain)	Olga García	Levante	Transfer	
21	FW	(Spain)	Bárbara Latorre	Espanyol	Transfer	
22	FW	(Portugal)	Andreia Norton	(Portugal) Clube de Albergaria	Transfer	
24	MF	(Spain)	Irene del Río	Oviedo Moderno	Transfer	
25	GK	(United States)	Kaeli Schmidt	(United States) Saint Mary's Gaels	–	

=== Out ===
No.	Pos.	Nat.	Player	Moving to	Source
Summer
13	GK	(England)	Chelsea Ashurst	Atlético Málaga	
7	MF	(Spain)	Marta Corredera	(England) Arsenal	
6	MF	(Spain)	Virginia Torrecilla	(France) Montpellier	
17	FW	(Spain)	Sonia Bermúdez	Atlético Madrid	
11	FW	(Spain)	Ana Romero (Willy)	Valencia	

== Friendlies ==
=== Pre-season ===
19 August 2015 Unofficial friendly	Montpellier (France)	1–1	Barcelona	Sussargues, France
18:00	Jakobsson 86'	Report	Irene del Río 7'

23 August 2015 Unofficial friendly	Barcelona	4–0	(France) ASPTT Albi	Sant Joan Despí
13:00	Alexia 43'; Melanie 64'; Olga 69'	Report		Stadium: Ciutat Esportiva Joan Gamper

26 August 2015 Unofficial friendly	L'Estartit	0–7	Barcelona	Palafrugell
18:30		Report	Irene del Río first half; Baudet first half; Marta Unzué second half; Patri second half; Olga second half

=== Mid-season ===
12 February 2016 Unofficial friendly	Barcelona	3–0	(South Korea) Hyundai Steel Red Angels	Sant Joan Despí
10:30	Unzué 11'; Jenni 42'; Ane 62'	Report		Stadium: Pitch 1, Ciutat Esportiva Joan Gamper

== Competitions ==
=== Overall record ===
Competition	First match	Last match	Starting round	Final position	Record							
Competition	First match	Last match	Starting round	Final position	Pld	W	D	L	GF	GA	GD	Win %
Primera División	6 September 2015	12 June 2016	Matchday 1	2nd	30	24	5	1	98	12	+86	80.00
Copa de la Reina	18 June 2016	26 June 2016	Quarterfinals	Runners-up	3	2	0	1	10	4	+6	66.67
Copa Catalunya	28 August 2015	30 August 2015	Semifinals	Winners	2	2	0	0	10	0	+10	100.00
UEFA Women's Champions League	7 October 2015	30 March 2016	Round of 32	Quarter-finals	6	3	2	1	7	3	+4	50.00
Total					41	31	7	3	125	19	+106	75.61

Source: Competitions

=== Pre-season ===
==== Copa Catalunya ====
28 August 2015 Semifinal	Barcelona	8–0	Sant Pere Pescador	Vilassar de Mar
	Bárbara 8', 84'; Patri 12', 61'; Olga 31'; Sandra 48', 68'; Gemma 50'	Report		Stadium: Camp Municipal Xevi Ramon; Referee: Cecília Muñoz de Giovanbattis

30 August 2015 Final	Barcelona	2–0	Espanyol	Vilassar de Mar
	Ruth 56'; Gemma 81'	Report		Stadium: Camp Municipal Xevi Ramon; Referee: Ainara Acevedo Dudley

=== Primera División ===
==== Results summary ====
Overall								Home						Away					
Pld	W	D	L	GF	GA	GD	Pts	W	D	L	GF	GA	GD	W	D	L	GF	GA	GD
30	24	5	1	98	12	+86	77	12	2	1	51	7	+44	12	3	0	47	5	+42

Source: Soccerway

==== Results by round ====
Round	1	2	3	4	5	6	7	8	9	10	11	12	13	14	15	16	17	18	19	20	21	22	23	24	25	26	27	28	29	30
Ground	A	H	A	H	H	A	H	A	H	A	H	A	H	A	H	H	A	H	A	A	H	A	H	A	H	A	H	A	H	A
Result	W	W	D	W	W	W	D	W	W	D	W	W	W	D	W	W	W	D	W	W	W	W	W	W	W	W	W	W	L	W
Position	2	1	3	2	2	2	3	3	3	3	3	3	2	2	2	2	2	2	2	2	2	2	2	2	2	2	2	2	2	2

Updated to match(es) played on 12 June 2016. Source: La Liga
A = Away; H = Home; W = Win; D = Draw; L = Loss; P = Postponed

Qualified for 2016–17 UEFA Women's Champions League and 2016 Copa de la Reina
Qualified for 2016 Copa de la Reina

==== Matches ====
===== First split =====
6 September 2015 1	Granadilla Tenerife	1–3	Barcelona	San Isidro
11:00	Sara Tui 42'	Report	Jenni 5', 82'; Patri 62'	Stadium: Estadio La Palmera; Referee: López Benito

13 September 2015 2	Barcelona	7–1	Levante	Sant Joan Despí
16:30	Jenni 18', 42', 59'; Torrejón 45+1'; Irene 72'; Bárbara 74'; Sandra 76'	Report	Charlyn 10'	Stadium: Pitch 1, Ciutat Esportiva Joan Gamper; Referee: Martín Varas

27 September 2015 3	Athletic Club	1–1	Barcelona	Lezama
10:30	Gimbert 56' (yellow card); Iraia (yellow card); Garazi (yellow card)	Report	Ane Bergara 7'; Leire (yellow card)	Stadium: Pitch 2, Instalaciones de Lezama; Referee: Pardo Saavedra

4 October 2015 4	Barcelona	2–0	Valencia	Sant Joan Despí
11:00	Bárbara 48'; Patri 51'	Report		Stadium: Pitch 1, Ciutat Esportiva Joan Gamper; Referee: Ávalos Barrera

11 October 2015 5	Barcelona	6–0	Transportes Alcaine	Sant Joan Despí
17:30	Olga 4'; Jenni 22', 42'; Clara 25' (o.g.); Ruth 34'; Bárbara 69'	Report		Stadium: Pitch 1, Ciutat Esportiva Joan Gamper

18 October 2015 6	Rayo Vallecano	1–2	Barcelona	Madrid
	Szymanowski 56'	Report	Miriam 29'; Torrejón 47'	Stadium: Ciudad Deportiva Fundación Rayo Vallecano

1 November 2015 7	Barcelona	1–1	Sporting de Huelva	Sant Joan Despí
	Patri 49'	Report	Napoli 89'	Stadium: Pitch 1, Ciutat Esportiva Joan Gamper; Referee: Ferrero Mansilla

8 November 2015 8	Fundación Albacete	0–10	Barcelona	Albacete
	Penalty missed	Report	Alexia 11', 32', 52', 62'; Olga 35'; Bárbara 76', 85'; Baudet 77'; Jenni 81'; Patri 89'	Stadium: Ciudad Deportiva Andrés Iniesta

15 November 2015 9	Barcelona	2–1	Collerense	Sant Joan Despí
12:00	Bárbara 7'; Alexia 64'	Report	Gabi 46'	Stadium: Pitch 1, Ciutat Esportiva Joan Gamper; Referee: Raúl Calle Martínez

21 November 2015 10	Espanyol	0–0	Barcelona	Sant Adrià de Besòs
		Report		Stadium: Ciutat Esportiva Dani Jarque; Referee: Mancera Antón

6 December 2015 11	Barcelona	5–1	Santa Teresa	Sant Joan Despí
	Paula López 37' (o.g.); Bárbara 49', 85'; Jenni 57'; Menayo 75' (o.g.)	Report	Estefa 90' (pen.)	Stadium: Pitch 1, Ciutat Esportiva Joan Gamper; Referee: Rodríguez Enrique

12 December 2015 12	Real Sociedad	0–3	Barcelona	Zubieta
	L. Fernández (yellow card) 38'	Report	Jenni 13', 87' (yellow card) 69'; Miriam (yellow card) 43'; Bárbara 73'	Stadium: Zubieta Facilities; Referee: Antón Mosqueira

10 January 2016 13	Barcelona	2–0	Oiartzun KE	Sant Joan Despí
	Alexia 22'; Ane Bergara 54'	Report		Stadium: Pitch 1, Ciutat Esportiva Joan Gamper; Referee: Alejandro Carrillo

16 January 2016 14	Atlético Féminas	0–0	Barcelona	Majadahonda
		Report		Stadium: Cerro del Espino; Referee: Manuel Pérez Hernández

31 January 2016 15	Barcelona	8–0	Oviedo Moderno	Sant Joan Despí
	Iris 8' (o.g.); Jenni 41'; Ille 55', 58'; Alexia 66', 70', 86'; Olga 68'	Report		Stadium: Pitch 1, Ciutat Esportiva Joan Gamper; Referee: Alex Muñoz

===== Second split =====
7 February 2016 16	Barcelona	3–0	Granadilla Tenerife	Sant Joan Despí
	Alexia 11'; Ane Bergara 35'; Jenni (penalty missed); Pili 44' (o.g.)	Report		Stadium: Pitch 1, Ciutat Esportiva Joan Gamper; Referee: Arnau Llompart

21 February 2016 17	Levante	0–1	Barcelona	Valencia
		Report	Olga 13'	Stadium: El Terrer; Referee: José Antonio Morales Yuste

28 February 2016 18	Barcelona	1–1	Athletic Club	Barcelona
	Miriam 22'	Athletic Club; Barcelona	Melanie 53' (o.g.); Joseba Agirre (manager) (red card); Lizaso C. (yellow card) (yellow-red card) 82'; Garazi (yellow card); M. Oroz (yellow card)	Stadium: Mini Estadi; Attendance: 2,413; Referee: Ávalos Martos

13 March 2016 19	Valencia	1–2	Barcelona	Paterna
	Carol 18'	Report	Alexia 16'; Ruth 23'	Stadium: Estadi Antonio Puchades; Attendance: 800; Referee: Francesc Bañó Solera

20 March 2016 20	Transportes Alcaine	0–3	Barcelona	Zaragoza
	Sandra Bernal (yellow card)	Report	Jenni 26'; Ille 75'; Bárbara 78'	Stadium: Estadio Pedro Sancho; Referee: Alberto Almenara Martínez

27 March 2016 21	Barcelona	4–0	Rayo Vallecano	Sant Joan Despí
	Alexia 3'; Jenni 42' (pen.), 51'; Bárbara 78'	Report		Stadium: Ciutat Esportiva Joan Gamper; Referee: Sauleda Torrent

3 April 2016 22	Sporting de Huelva	1–2	Barcelona	Huelva
	Martín-Prieto 32'	Report	Olga 59'; Jenni 70'	Stadium: La Orden; Referee: Gómez Abad

17 April 2016 23	Barcelona	2–0	Fundación Albacete	Sant Joan Despí
	Jenni 20', 53'	Report	Celia (yellow card)	Stadium: Ciutat Esportiva Joan Gamper; Referee: García Verdura

24 April 2016 24	Collerense	0–3	Barcelona	Palma de Mallorca
		Report	Mariona 3', 22'; Patri 49'	Stadium: Camp Municipal Coll d'en Rebassa Ca'n Caimari; Referee: Gonzalo Borreda Giménez

1 May 2016 25	Barcelona	7–1	Espanyol	Sant Joan Despí
12:00	Olga 32', 35'; Jenni 39' (pen.), 58', 64'; Sandra 67'; Alexia 73'	Report	Elba 70'	Stadium: Pitch 7, Ciutat Esportiva Joan Gamper; Attendance: 700; Referee: David Medié Jiménez

14 May 2016 26	Santa Teresa	0–7	Barcelona	Badajoz
	Lixy (yellow card)	Report	Unzué 7'; Jenni 20', 41'; Míriam 39'; Irene 74'; Gemma 86'; Alexia 88'	Stadium: El Viver; Referee: Santiago Quijada Alcón

22 May 2016 27	Barcelona	1–0	Real Sociedad	Sant Joan Despí
12:00	Alexia 11'	Report		Stadium: Ciutat Esportiva Joan Gamper; Referee: Alex Meneses

29 May 2016 28	Oiartzun KE	0–5	Barcelona	Oiartzun
		Report	Míriam 18'; Torrejón 44'; Alexia 70'; Patri 73'; Bárbara 78'	Stadium: Karla Lekuona; Referee: Gómez Luque

5 June 2016 29	Barcelona	0–1	Atlético Féminas	Sant Joan Despí
11:00	Miriam (yellow card) 90'	Report	Esther 36'; María León (yellow card) 49'	Stadium: Ciutat Esportiva Joan Gamper; Attendance: 400; Referee: Gonzalo Freixa Romero

12 June 2016 30	Oviedo Moderno	0–5	Barcelona	Oviedo
		Report	Alexia 2', 30'; Jenni 41'; Irene 64'; Gemma 86'	Stadium: Estadio Manuel Díaz Vega; Referee: Álvarez Lana

Source: Soccerway

=== Post-season ===
==== Copa de la Reina ====
18 June 2016 Quarterfinal	Real Sociedad	1–5	Barcelona	Las Rozas
10:00	Nahikari 66'	Report	Diéguez 30'; Putellas 33', 90+3'; Latorre 76', 89'; Torrejón (yellow card)	Stadium: La Ciudad del Fútbol; Referee: Miguel Gómez

24 June 2016 Semifinal	Barcelona	3–0	Levante	Las Rozas
18:00	Diéguez 17'; Hermoso 82'; Guijarro 85'; Unzué (yellow card)	Report	Guti (yellow card)	Stadium: La Ciudad del Fútbol; Referee: Marta Huerta

26 June 2016 Final	Barcelona	2–3	Atlético Féminas	Las Rozas
11:00	Melanie (yellow card) 27' (yellow-red card) 87'; Hermoso 57' (pen.), 63'; Diéguez (yellow card) 67'; Aitana (yellow card) 77'; Bárbara (yellow card) 87'	Report	Sosa 5'; Meseguer 14'; Priscila (yellow card) 28'; E. González 29'; Amanda (yellow card) 78'	Stadium: La Ciudad del Fútbol; Attendance: 2,000; Referee: Marta Frías Acedo

=== UEFA Women's Champions League ===
==== Knockout stage ====
7 October 2015 Round of 32	BIIK Kazygurt (Kazakhstan)	1–1	Barcelona	Shymkent, Kazakhstan
	Woods 82'	Report	R. García 57'	Stadium: BIIK Stadium; Attendance: 2,000; Referee: Karolina Radzik-Johan (Poland)

14 October 2015 Round of 32	Barcelona	4–1	(Kazakhstan) BIIK Kazygurt	Barcelona
	Hermoso 11', 65'; Serrano 20'; Unzué 52'	Report	Krasyukova (yellow card) 85'; Gabelia 90'	Stadium: Mini Estadi; Attendance: 1,115; Referee: Sofia Karagiorgi (Cyprus)

11 November 2015 Round of 16	Twente (Netherlands)	0–1	Barcelona	Enschede, Netherlands
		Report	O. García 76' (yellow card)	Stadium: De Grolsch Veste; Attendance: 15,637; Referee: Pernilla Larsson (Sweden)

18 November 2015 Round of 16	Barcelona	1–0	(Netherlands) Twente	Barcelona
	O. García 25'	Report	van de Sanden (yellow card) 17'; Munsterman (yellow card) 64'	Stadium: Mini Estadi; Attendance: 3,219; Referee: Esther Staubli (Switzerland)

23 March 2016 Quarter-finals	Barcelona	0–0	(France) Paris Saint-Germain	Barcelona
	Serrano (yellow card) 12'	Report		Stadium: Mini Estadi; Attendance: 8,369; Referee: Katalin Kulcsár (Hungary)

30 March 2016 Quarter-finals	Paris Saint-Germain (France)	1–0	Barcelona	Paris, France
	Cruz (yellow card) 81'; Cristiane 86'; Houara (yellow card) 90+4'	Report	Bergara (yellow card) 82'; Patri (yellow card) 90+3'	Stadium: Stade Sébastien Charléty; Attendance: 5,161; Referee: Riem Hussein (Germany)

== Statistics ==
=== Overall ===
As of 26 June 2016

No..	Pos.	Nat.	Player	Primera División		Copa de la Reina		Copa Catalunya		Champions League		Total		Discipline		Notes
No..	Pos.	Nat.	Player	Apps	Goals	Apps	Goals	Apps	Goals	Apps	Goals	Apps	Goals	Yellow card	Red card	Notes
Goalkeepers
1	GK	(Spain)	Laura Ràfols	13	0	0	0	1+1	0	2	0	17	0	0	0	
13	GK	(Spain)	Sandra Paños	17	0	3	0	1+1	0	4	0	26	0	0	0	
Defenders
2	DF	(Spain)	Ane Bergara	29+1	3	3	0	2	0	6	0	41	3	1	0	
3	DF	(Spain)	Ruth García	28	2	3	0	2	1	6	1	39	4	0	0	
4	DF	(Spain)	Marta Unzué	26+2	1	3	0	2	0	6	1	39	2	1	0	
5	DF	(Spain)	Melanie Serrano	25+5	0	3	0	2	0	6	1	41	1	1	1	
6	DF	(Spain)	Esther Romero	0	0	0	0	0+1	0	0	0	1	0	0	0	
17	DF	(Spain)	Núria Garrote	1	0	0	0	0	0	0+1	0	2	0	0	0	
23	DF	(Spain)	Leire Landa	17+2	0	0	0	0	0	4	0	23	0	1	0	Also wore 19
Midfielders
7	MF	(Spain)	Gemma Gili	11+15	2	1+2	0	0+2	2	2+3	0	36	4	0	0	
8	MF	(Spain)	Míriam Diéguez	21+4	4	3	2	0	0	5	0	33	6	3	0	
12	MF	(Spain)	Patricia Guijarro	10+13	6	0+3	1	2	2	1+4	0	33	9	1	0	
14	MF	(Spain)	Cristina Baudet	0+4	1	0	0	0+1	0	0	0	5	1	0	0	
15	MF	(Spain)	Sandra Hernández	4+11	2	0+1	0	0+2	2	1+1	0	20	4	0	0	
16	MF	(Spain)	Pilar Garrote	0+1	0	0	0	0	0	0	0	1	0	0	0	
18	MF	(Spain)	Marta Torrejón	27	3	3	0	2	0	6	0	38	3	1	0	
24	MF	(Spain)	Irene del Río	11+11	6	1+1	0	2	0	0+1	0	27	6	0	0	Also wore 17
28	MF	(Spain)	Aitana Bonmatí	0	0	0+3	0	0+1	0	0	0	4	0	1	0	
	MF	(Spain)	Nerea Valeriano	0	0	0	0	0+1	0	0	0	1	0	0	0	
Forwards
9	FW	(Spain)	Mariona Caldentey	5+8	2	0	0	0	0	0	0	13	2	0	0	
10	FW	(Spain)	Jenni Hermoso	29	24	3	3	0	0	6	2	38	29	1	0	
11	FW	(Spain)	Alexia Putellas	26+3	18	3	2	2	0	4+1	0	39	20	0	0	
19	FW	(Spain)	Andrea Falcón	0+1	0	0	0	0	0	0+1	0	2	0	0	0	Also wore 24
20	FW	(Spain)	Olga García	23+4	7	3	0	2	1	6	2	38	10	1	0	
21	FW	(Spain)	Bárbara Latorre	7+19	12	1+2	2	2	2	1+3	0	35	16	1	0	Also wore 22
22	FW	(Portugal)	Andreia Norton	0	0	0	0	0	0	0	0	0	0	0	0	
Own goals (1)

=== Goalscorers ===
As of 26 June 2016

Rank	No.	Pos.	Nat.	Player	Primera División	Copa de la Reina	Copa Catalunya	Champions League	Total
1	10	FW	(Spain)	Jenni Hermoso	24	3	—	2	29
2	11	FW	(Spain)	Alexia Putellas	18	2	—	—	20
3	21	FW	(Spain)	Bárbara Latorre	12	2	2	—	16
4	20	FW	(Spain)	Olga García	7	—	1	2	10
5	12	MF	(Spain)	Patricia Guijarro	6	1	2	—	9
6	24	MF	(Spain)	Irene del Río	6	—	—	—	6
6	8	MF	(Spain)	Míriam Diéguez	4	2	—	—	6
8	7	MF	(Spain)	Gemma Gili	2	—	2	—	4
8	15	MF	(Spain)	Sandra Hernández	2	—	2	—	4
8	3	DF	(Spain)	Ruth García	2	—	1	1	4
11	2	DF	(Spain)	Ane Bergara	3	—	—	—	3
11	18	MF	(Spain)	Marta Torrejón	3	—	—	—	3
13	9	FW	(Spain)	Mariona Caldentey	2	—	—	—	2
13	4	DF	(Spain)	Marta Unzué	1	—	—	1	2
15	14	MF	(Spain)	Cristina Baudet	1	—	—	—	1
15	5	DF	(Spain)	Melanie Serrano	—	—	—	1	1
Own goals (from the opponents)					5	—	—	—	5
Totals					98	10	10	7	125

=== Cleansheets ===
As of 26 June 2016

Rank	No.	Nat.	Player	Primera División	Copa de la Reina	Copa Catalunya	Champions League	Total
1	1	(Spain)	Laura Ràfols	10	—	1	1	12
1	13	(Spain)	Sandra Paños	8	1	1	2	12
Totals				18	1	2	3	24

=== Disciplinary record ===
As of 26 June 2016

No.	Pos.	Nat.	Player	Primera División			Copa de la Reina			Copa Catalunya			Champions League			Total		
No.	Pos.	Nat.	Player	Yellow card	(yellow card) (yellow-red card)	Red card	Yellow card	(yellow card) (yellow-red card)	Red card	Yellow card	(yellow card) (yellow-red card)	Red card	Yellow card	(yellow card) (yellow-red card)	Red card	Yellow card	(yellow card) (yellow-red card)	Red card
5	DF	(Spain)	Melanie Serrano					1					1			1	1	
8	MF	(Spain)	Míriam Diéguez	2			1									3		
23	DF	(Spain)	Leire Landa	1												1		
10	FW	(Spain)	Jenni Hermoso	1												1		
18	MF	(Spain)	Marta Torrejón				1									1		
4	DF	(Spain)	Marta Unzué				1									1		
28	MF	(Spain)	Aitana Bonmatí				1									1		
21	FW	(Spain)	Bárbara Latorre				1									1		
20	FW	(Spain)	Olga García										1			1		
2	DF	(Spain)	Ane Bergara										1			1		
12	MF	(Spain)	Patri Guijarro										1			1		
Totals				4			5	1					4			13	1	

Source: FCBarcelona.com
Ordered by (red card) , (second yellow card) and (yellow card)
(yellow card) = Number of bookings; (second yellow card) = Number of sending offs after a second yellow card; (red card) = Number of sending offs by a direct red card.
