= 2017–18 FC Barcelona Femení season =

FC Barcelona Femení
2017–18 season
- Chairman: Josep Maria Bartomeu
- Manager: Fran Sánchez
- Stadium: Mini Estadi / Joan Gamper
- Primera División: 2nd
- Champions League: Quarterfinal
Home colours	Away colours	Third colours

The 2017–18 season was the 30th season in the history of FC Barcelona Femení, its 17th season as FC Barcelona's official women's football section and its 10th consecutive season in Primera División.

== Squad ==
=== First team ===
Note: Flags indicate national team as defined under FIFA eligibility rules. Players may hold more than one non-FIFA nationality.

No.	Pos.	Nat.	Name	Age	Since	App.	Goals
Goalkeepers
1	GK	(Spain)	Laura Ràfols (co-captain)	27	2007		0
13	GK	(Spain)	Sandra Paños	25	2015	96	0
25	GK	(Spain)	Andrea Giménez		2016	2	0
Defenders
5	DF	(Spain)	Melanie Serrano	28	2003		
4	DF	(Spain)	Marta Unzué (co-captain)	29	2006		
8	DF	(Spain)	Marta Torrejón (co-captain)	28	2013	194	18
3	DF	(Spain)	Ruth García	31	2013	176	12
15	DF	(Spain)	Leila Ouahabi		2011		
2	DF	(Denmark)	Line Røddik Hansen		2016	34	2
18	DF	(Brazil)	Fabiana		2017	13	1
14	DF	(Spain)	Mapi León		2017	37	2
27	DF	(France)	Perle Morroni		2018	5	0
Midfielders
6	MF	(Spain)	Vicky Losada (co-captain)		2006		
7	MF	(Spain)	Gemma Gili	24	2012		
11	MF	(Spain)	Alexia Putellas	24	2012		
12	MF	(Spain)	Patricia Guijarro	20	2015	98	22
17	MF	(Brazil)	Andressa Alves		2016	55	15
24	MF	(Spain)	Aitana Bonmatí	20	2016	43	6
20	MF	(France)	Élise Bussaglia		2017	32	3
Forwards
10	FW	(Spain)	Olga García	26	2010		
9	FW	(Spain)	Mariona Caldentey	22	2014	95	34
19	FW	(Spain)	Bárbara Latorre	25	2015	98	38
21	FW	(North Macedonia)	Nataša Andonova		2017	28	6
16	FW	(England)	Toni Duggan		2017	35	14
22	FW	(Netherlands)	Lieke Martens		2017	38	14
23	FW	(Spain)	Candela Andújar		2017	2	0

- Source: FCBarcelona.com
- Ordered by arrival.

=== Reserve team ===
Players from the B team eligible to train and play with the main squad.

Note: Flags indicate national team as defined under FIFA eligibility rules; some limited exceptions apply. Players may hold more than one non-FIFA nationality.

No.	Pos.	Nation	Player
26	FW	ESP	Clàudia Pina
—	MF	ESP	Anna Torrodà

== Transfers ==
In
Date	Position	Player	Age	Moving from	Reference
June 22, 2017	Midfielder	(France) Élise Bussaglia	31	(Germany) Wolfsburg	Official Website
June 23, 2017	Forward	(North Macedonia) Nataša Andonova	23	(France) PSG	Official Website
July 6, 2017	Forward	(England) Toni Duggan	25	(England) Manchester City	Official Website
July 12, 2017	Midfielder	(Netherlands) Lieke Martens	24	(Sweden) Rosengård	Official Website
July 30, 2017	Defender	(Brazil) Fabiana	27	(Brazil) SC Corinthians	Official Website
August 24, 2017	Defender	(Spain) Mapi León	22	(Spain) Atlético Madrid	Official Website
January 10, 2018	Defender	(France) Perle Morroni	20	(France) PSG (Loan)	Official Website

Out
Date	Position	Player	Age	Moving to	Reference
June 30, 2017	Forward	(Ivory Coast) Ange N'Guessan	26	(Spain) UDG Tenerife	Official Website
June 30, 2017	Forward	(Spain) Jennifer Hermoso	27	(France) PSG	Official Website
June 30, 2017	Midfielder	(Spain) Sandra Hernández	20	(Spain) Valencia	Official Website
June 30, 2017	Defender	(Spain) Leire Landa	30	Retired	Official Website
July 31, 2017	Defender	(Spain) Miriam Diéguez	31	(Spain) Levante UD	Official Website
July 31, 2017	Defender	(Spain) Ane Bergara	30	(Spain) Athletic Club	Official Website
August 31, 2017	Midfielder	(Spain) Irene del Río	26	Retired	Official Website

== Pre-season friendlies ==
9 August 2017 Friendly	UE Olot	0–17	Barcelona	Olot
18:30 CEST		Report	Ruth 2'; Irene 9', 19', 77'; Teresa 17', 24', 90'; Andressa 32' (pen.), 37'; Andonova 39'; Candela 46'; Claudia Pina 47', 49', 56'; Ainhoa 70'; Laura 84'; Torrodà 88'	Stadium: Municipal d'Olot; Referee: Jan Cobos

12 August 2017 Friendly	AEM Lleida	0–9	Barcelona	Les Preses
12:00 CEST		Report	Claudia Pina 9', 23'; Candela 14', 36'; Irene 17'; Andonova 25'; Andressa 43'; Teresa 76'; Laura 90'	Stadium: Camp Municipal Bosc de Tosca; Referee: Esther Parramon

18 August 2017 ASPTT Summer Tour friendly	Olympique de Marseille (France)	0–0	Barcelona	Albi, France
18:30 CEST		Report		Stadium: Maurice Rigaud

20 August 2017 ASPTT Summer Tour friendly	ASPTT Albi (France)	0–4	Barcelona	Albi, France
14:00 CEST		Report	Alexia 31' (pen.); Claudia Pina 45'; Andonova 83' (pen.); Andressa 87'	Stadium: Maurice Rigaud; Referee: Damien Tonon

== Competitive results ==
Win Draw Loss Postponed

=== Copa Catalunya ===
25 August 2017 Semi-final	Barcelona	5–0	CE Europa	Gavà
20:00 CEST	Olga 8'; Andressa 33'; Claudia Pina 80', 86'; Mariona 90'	Report		Stadium: La Bòbila; Referee: Paula Lindez

27 August 2017 Final	Barcelona	3–0	Espanyol	Gavà
12:00 CEST	Dulce 12' (o.g.); Bárbara 35'; Patri 92'	Report		Stadium: La Bòbila

=== Primera División ===
==== League table ====
Pos	Team	Pld	W	D	L	GF	GA	GD	Pts	Qualification or relegation
1	Atlético de Madrid (C)	30	24	5	1	74	21	+53	77	Qualification for the UEFA Champions League and Copa de la Reina
2	Barcelona	30	24	4	2	98	12	+86	76	Qualification for the UEFA Champions League and Copa de la Reina
3	Athletic Club	30	18	2	10	51	41	+10	56	Qualification for the Copa de la Reina
4	Granadilla	30	16	6	8	48	33	+15	54	Qualification for the Copa de la Reina
5	Valencia	30	14	8	8	49	32	+17	50	Qualification for the Copa de la Reina

Source: La Liga, Soccerway
Rules for classification: 1) points; 2) head-to-head points; 3) goal difference; 4) number of goals scored
(C) Champions

==== Matches ====
3 September 2017 1	Zaragoza	0–9	Barcelona	Zaragoza
19:00 CEST		Report	Marta 10', 55'; Alexia 23', 40'; Andressa 32', 45' (pen.); Mariona 36'; Bárbara 50'; Duggan 78'	Stadium: Estadio Pedro Sancho; Referee: Elena Contreras

9 September 2017 2	Barcelona	3–0	Albacete	Sant Joan Despí
16:00 CEST	Marta 4'; Andressa 26'; Mariona 43'	Report		Stadium: Joan Gamper; Attendance: 350; Referee: Beatríz Arregui

24 September 2017 3	Real Sociedad	0–1	Barcelona	Usurbil
16:00 CEST		Report	Bussaglia 70'	Stadium: Zubieta; Referee: Marta Frías

30 September 2017 4	Barcelona	10–0	Santa Teresa	Sant Joan Despí
10:45 CEST	Duggan 2'; Alexia 15'; Alba 28' (o.g.); Martens 44'; Vicky 49'; Fabiana 55'; Røddik 66'; Andressa 75', 90'; Olga 88'	Report		Stadium: Joan Gamper; Referee: Zuelma González

8 October 2017 5	Athletic Bilbao	1–2	Barcelona	Lezama
16:00 CEST	Cirauqui 33'	Report	Martens 6'; Mariona 31' (pen.)	Stadium: Lezama Facilities; Referee: Elena Contreras

14 October 2017 6	Barcelona	2–0	Valencia	Sant Joan Despí
16:00 CEST	Duggan 28'; Alexia 76'	Report		Stadium: Joan Gamper; Referee: Marta Huerta

29 October 2017 7	Atlético Madrid	1–1	Barcelona	Majadahonda
18:15 CEST	Kenti 63'	Report	Andressa 27'	Stadium: Cerro del Espino; Referee: Marta Frías

4 November 2017 8	Barcelona	3–0	Sporting Huelva	Barcelona
10:45 CEST	Patri 35', 53'; Andonova 74'	Report		Stadium: Mini Estadi; Attendance: 540; Referee: Olatz Rivera

12 November 2017 9	Barcelona	7–0	Madrid CFF	Sant Joan Despí
18:00 CEST	Martens 5'; Bárbara 16', 67', 79', 86'; Andonova 34'; Duggan 72'	Report		Stadium: Joan Gamper; Attendance: 604; Referee: Marta Huerta

19 November 2017 10	Granadilla	1–0	Barcelona	El Médano
13:00 CEST	Simpson 26'	Report		Stadium: La Hoya del Pozo; Referee: María Martínez

2 December 2017 11	Barcelona	6–1	Real Betis	Barcelona
16:00 CEST	Andonova 4'; Bárbara 20', 38'; Duggan 42', 54'; Marta 57'	Report	Andrea 67'	Stadium: Mini Estadi; Attendance: 519; Referee: María Martínez

6 December 2017 12	Sevilla	0–2	Barcelona	Seville
16:00 CEST		Report	Andressa 35' (pen.); Ruth 45'	Stadium: CD José Ramón Cisneros Palacios; Referee: Zuelma González

10 December 2017 13	Barcelona	4–0	Espanyol	Sant Joan Despí
16:00 CEST	Mapi 9'; Martens 43', 83'; Duggan 71'	Report		Stadium: Joan Gamper; Attendance: 958; Referee: Elena Contreras

17 December 2017 14	Rayo Vallecano	1–2	Barcelona	Madrid
16:00 CEST	Andújar 59'	Report	Patri 25'; Duggan 69'	Stadium: Ciudad Deportiva Rayo Vallecano; Referee: Marta Frías

7 January 2018 15	Barcelona	5–0	Levante	Barcelona
13:00 CEST	Bussaglia 9'; Patri 13', 23'; Alexia 43'; Martens 55'	Report		Stadium: Mini Estadi; Referee: María José Villegas

14 January 2018 16	Barcelona	2–0	Zaragoza	Sant Joan Despí
16:00 CEST	Vicky 27'; Andressa 82'	Report		Stadium: Joan Gamper; Referee: Olatz Rivera

27 January 2018 17	Albacete	0–3	Barcelona	Albacete
16:00 CEST		Report	Martens 14'; Duggan 41'; Patri 90'	Stadium: Ciudad Deportiva Andrés Iniesta; Referee: María Martínez

3 February 2018 18	Barcelona	0–0	Real Sociedad	Barcelona
16:00 CEST		Report		Stadium: Mini Estadi

10 February 2018 19	Santa Teresa	0–3	Barcelona	Badajoz
16:00 CET		Report	Bárbara 31', 82'; Alexia 64'	Stadium: El Vivero; Referee: Elena Peláez

18 February 2018 20	FC Barcelona	0–1	Athletic Bilbao	Barcelona
13:00 CET		Report	Córdoba 76'	Stadium: Mini Estadi; Referee: Marta Frías

25 February 2018 21	Valencia CF	1–4	FC Barcelona	Valencia
13:00 CET	Peiró 91'	Report	Mapi 4'; Martens 35'; Marta 45'; Andonova 62'	Stadium: Ciudad Deportiva de Paterna; Attendance: Elena Contreras

11 March 2018 22	FC Barcelona	1–1	Atlético Madrid	Sant Joan Despí
20:00 CET	Andressa 49' (pen.)	Report	Soni 21'	Stadium: Joan Gamper; Referee: Marta Huerta

18 March 2018 23	Sporting Huelva	1–1	FC Barcelona	Huelva
13:00 CET	Makore 48'	Report	Duggan 61'	Stadium: Campo Federativo de la Orden; Referee: Paola Cebollada

25 March 2018 24	Madrid CFF	1–2	FC Barcelona	San Sebastián de los Reyes
15:00 CET	Mascaró 48'	Report	Alexia 50'; Vicky 78'	Stadium: José Luis de la Hoz-Matapiñonera; Referee: Elena Casal

1 April 2018 25	FC Barcelona	3–1	UD Granadilla	Sant Joan Despí
12:00 CET	Patri 16', 43'; Pili 26' (o.g.)	Report	Simpson 27'	Stadium: Joan Gamper; Referee: Zuelma González

15 April 2018 26	Real Betis	0–2	FC Barcelona	Seville
		Report	Duggan 57'; Alexia 73'	Stadium: Ciudad Deportiva Luis del Sol; Referee: Marta Frías

22 April 2018 27	FC Barcelona	5–0	Sevilla FC	Sant Joan Despí
	Mariona 14', 29'; Alexia 34'; Bussaglia 82'; Martens 93'	Report		Stadium: Joan Gamper; Referee: María Martínez

29 April 2018 28	RCD Espanyol	1–3	FC Barcelona	Sant Adrià de Besòs
	Julve 4'	Report	Marta 4'; Mariona 23'; Bárbara 95'	Stadium: Ciutat Esportiva Dani Jarque; Attendance: 1040; Referee: Paola Cebollada

6 May 2018 29	FC Barcelona	7–0	Rayo Vallecano	Sant Joan Despí
	Alexia 6'; Andressa 16', 55'; Martens 28'; Auñon 53' (o.g.); Mariona 71' (pen.), 79'	Report		Stadium: Joan Gamper

13 May 2018 30	Levante UD	0–5	FC Barcelona	Buñol
		Report	Patri 18'; Martens 30'; Marta 60'; Andressa 65'; Andonova 85'	Stadium: Ciudad Deportiva de Buñol

=== UEFA Women's Champions League ===
==== Round of 32 ====
4 October 2017 First Leg	Avaldsnes IL (Norway)	0–4	Barcelona	Haugesund, Norway
18:00		Report	Martens 19'; Duggan 70'; Andressa 75'; Mariona 81'	Stadium: Haugesund Stadion; Attendance: 4,528; Referee: Silvia Domingos (POR)

11 October 2017 Second Leg	Barcelona	2–0	(Norway) Avaldsnes IL	Barcelona
18:30	Martens 52'; Vicky 57'	Report		Stadium: Mini Estadi; Referee: Graziella Pirriatore (ITA)

==== Round of 16 ====
8 November 2017 First Leg	FK Gintra (Lithuania)	0–6	Barcelona	Šiauliai, Lithuania
16:00 GMT		Report	Aitana 36'; Mariona 44', 57'; Duggan 68'; Olga 82'; Andonova 89'	Stadium: Savivaldybė Stadium; Referee: Lorraine Clark (SCO)

15 November 2017 Second Leg	Barcelona	3–0	(Lithuania) FK Gintra	Barcelona
17:30 GMT	Alexia 35'; Duggan 44'; Alekperova 76' (o.g.)	Report		Stadium: Mini Estadi; Attendance: 707; Referee: Eszter Urban (HUN)

==== Quarterfinals ====
22 March 2018 First Leg	Lyon (France)	2–1	Barcelona	Décines-Charpieu, France
18:45 CET	Marozsán 44'; Hegerberg 80'	Report	Guijarro 72'	Stadium: Parc Olympique Lyonnais; Attendance: 15,104; Referee: Pernilla Larsson (SWE)

28 March 2018 Second Leg	Barcelona	0–1	(France) Lyon	Barcelona
18:00 CET		Report	Le Sommer 62'	Stadium: Mini Estadi; Attendance: 12,178; Referee: Sandra Bastos (POR)

=== Copa de la Reina ===
20 May 2018 Quarterfinal – first leg	Barcelona	1–0	Levante UD	Sant Joan Despí
	Alexia 53'	Report		Stadium: Joan Gamper; Referee: Maria José Villegas

24 May 2018 Quarterfinal – second leg	Levante UD	0–1	Barcelona	Buñol
		Report	Alexia 82'	Stadium: Ciudad Deportiva de Buñol; Referee: Elena Peláez

26 May 2018 Semifinal	Athletic Bilbao	2–2 (a.e.t.) (3–4 p)	Barcelona	Reus
16:00	Arraiza 83'; L. García 95'	Report	Caldentey 36'; Martens 94'	Stadium: Municipal; Referee: Marta Frías
	Penalties
	Gimbert (penalty scored); Vázquez (penalty scored); Murua (penalty scored); Arraiza (penalty missed); L. García (penalty missed)		(penalty scored) Andanova; (penalty scored) Losada; (penalty missed) Duggan; (penalty scored) Guijarro; (penalty scored) Andressa

2 June 2018 Final	Barcelona	1–0 (a.e.t.)	Atlético Madrid	Mérida
20:30	Caldentey 120+2'	Report		Stadium: Estadio Romano; Attendance: 13,600; Referee: Marta Huerta de Aza

== Statistics ==
=== Squad appearances and goals ===
As of 2 June 2018

No.	Pos.	Nat.	Player	Total			Primera División			Champions League			Copa de la Reina			Copa Catalunya		
No.	Pos.	Nat.	Player	Games		Goals	Games		Goals	Games		Goals	Games		Goals	Games		Goals
No.	Pos.	Nat.	Player	Pl.	St.	Goals	Pl.	St.	Goals	Pl.	St.	Goals	Pl.	St.	Goals	Pl.	St.	Goals
1	GK	(Spain)	Laura Ràfols	5	5	0	3	3	0	1	1	0	0	0	0	1	1	0
2	DF	(Denmark)	Line Røddik Hansen	5	3	1	3	1	1	1	1	0	0	0	0	1	1	0
3	DF	(Spain)	Ruth García	22	14	1	17	11	1	1	0	0	2	2	0	2	1	0
4	DF	(Spain)	Marta Unzué	25	7	0	18	5	0	2	2	0	3	0	0	2	0	0
5	DF	(Spain)	Melanie Serrano	40	35	0	30	27	0	4	3	0	4	4	0	2	1	0
6	MF	(Spain)	Victoria Losada	37	27	4	28	20	3	5	4	1	4	3	0	0	0	0
7	MF	(Spain)	Gemma Gili	27	20	0	20	15	0	2	1	0	3	2	0	2	2	0
8	DF	(Spain)	Marta Torrejón	36	36	7	26	26	7	6	6	0	1	1	0	1	1	0
9	FW	(Spain)	Mariona Caldentey	25	17	14	14	9	8	5	3	3	4	4	2	2	1	1
10	FW	(Spain)	Olga García	20	4	3	15	2	1	3	1	1	0	0	0	2	1	1
11	MF	(Spain)	Alexia Putellas	39	33	13	29	24	10	4	3	1	4	4	2	2	2	0
12	MF	(Spain)	Patricia Guijarro	37	31	11	25	21	9	6	5	1	4	4	0	2	1	1
13	GK	(Spain)	Sandra Paños	36	36	0	27	27	0	5	5	0	4	4	0	0	0	0
14	DF	(Spain)	Mapi León	37	37	2	29	29	2	5	5	0	3	3	0	0	0	0
15	DF	(Spain)	Leila Ouahabi	11	8	0	6	4	0	3	3	0	0	0	0	2	1	0
16	FW	(England)	Toni Duggan	35	26	14	26	20	11	6	5	3	3	1	0	0	0	0
17	MF	(Brazil)	Andressa Alves	29	19	14	19	12	12	4	3	1	4	2	0	2	2	1
18	DF	(Brazil)	Fabiana	13	9	1	9	5	1	2	2	0	2	2	0	0	0	0
19	FW	(Spain)	Bárbara Latorre	29	18	11	24	16	10	1	0	0	2	0	0	2	2	1
20	FW	(France)	Élise Bussaglia	32	25	3	22	17	3	4	4	0	4	3	0	2	1	0
21	FW	(North Macedonia)	Nataša Andonova	28	13	6	20	10	5	6	3	1	2	0	0	0	0	0
22	MF	(Netherlands)	Lieke Martens	38	36	14	29	27	11	5	5	2	4	4	1	0	0	0
23	FW	(Spain)	Candela Andújar	2	0	0	2	0	0	0	0	0	0	0	0	0	0	0
24	MF	(Spain)	Aitana Bonmatí	22	7	1	15	4	0	2	1	1	3	1	0	2	1	0
25	GK	(Spain)	Andrea Giménez	1	1	0	0	0	0	0	0	0	0	0	0	1	1	0
26	FW	(Spain)	Clàudia Pina	3	0	2	1	0	0	0	0	0	0	0	0	2	0	2
27	DF	(France)	Perle Morroni	5	3	0	4	3	0	1	0	0	0	0	0	0	0	0
	MF	(Spain)	Anna Torrodà	1	1	0	0	0	0	0	0	0	0	0	0	1	1	0

=== Disciplinary record ===
As of 2 June 2018

No.	Pos.	Nat.	Player	Total			Primera División			Champions League			Copa de la Reina			Copa Catalunya		
No.	Pos.	Nat.	Player	Booked	(yellow card) (yellow-red card)	Sent off (straight red)	Booked	(yellow card) (yellow-red card)	Sent off (straight red)	Booked	(yellow card) (yellow-red card)	Sent off (straight red)	Booked	(yellow card) (yellow-red card)	Sent off (straight red)	Booked	(yellow card) (yellow-red card)	Sent off (straight red)
1	GK	(Spain)	Laura Ràfols	1	0	0	1	0	0	0	0	0	0	0	0	0	0	0
3	DF	(Spain)	Ruth García	1	0	0	1	0	0	0	0	0	0	0	0	0	0	0
4	DF	(Spain)	Marta Unzué	1	0	0	1	0	0	0	0	0	0	0	0	0	0	0
5	DF	(Spain)	Melanie Serrano	1	0	0	1	0	0	0	0	0	0	0	0	0	0	0
6	MF	(Spain)	Victoria Losada	1	1	0	0	1	0	0	0	0	1	0	0	0	0	0
7	MF	(Spain)	Gemma Gili	2	0	0	2	0	0	0	0	0	0	0	0	0	0	0
8	DF	(Spain)	Marta Torrejón	1	0	0	0	0	0	0	0	0	0	0	0	1	0	0
11	MF	(Spain)	Alexia Putellas	1	0	0	1	0	0	0	0	0	0	0	0	0	0	0
12	MF	(Spain)	Patricia Guijarro	2	0	0	1	0	0	0	0	0	1	0	0	0	0	0
13	GK	(Spain)	Sandra Paños	1	0	0	1	0	0	0	0	0	0	0	0	0	0	0
14	DF	(Spain)	Mapi León	5	0	0	3	0	0	1	0	0	1	0	0	0	0	0
15	DF	(Spain)	Leila Ouahabi	1	0	0	1	0	0	0	0	0	0	0	0	0	0	0
17	MF	(Brazil)	Andressa Alves	3	0	0	2	0	0	0	0	0	1	0	0	0	0	0
19	FW	(Spain)	Bárbara Latorre	1	0	0	1	0	0	0	0	0	0	0	0	0	0	0
20	FW	(France)	Élise Bussaglia	4	0	0	2	0	0	0	0	0	1	0	0	1	0	0
21	FW	(North Macedonia)	Nataša Andonova	3	0	0	3	0	0	0	0	0	0	0	0	0	0	0
22	MF	(Netherlands)	Lieke Martens	1	0	0	1	0	0	0	0	0	0	0	0	0	0	0
24	MF	(Spain)	Aitana Bonmatí	2	0	0	2	0	0	0	0	0	0	0	0	0	0	0
27	DF	(France)	Perle Morroni	1	0	0	1	0	0	0	0	0	0	0	0	0	0	0
