= 2016 Copa de la Reina de Fútbol =

Tournament details
- Country: Spain
- Teams: 8

Final positions
- Champions: Atlético de Madrid (1st title)
- Runners-up: Barcelona

Tournament statistics
- Matches played: 7
- Goals scored: 29 (4.14 per match)
- Top goal scorer(s): Sonia Bermúdez (4 goals)

Awards
- Best player: Sonia Bermúdez

The 2016 Copa de la Reina de Fútbol was the 34th edition of the Spanish women's football national cup. It ran from 18 to 26 June 2016 and was contested by the top eight teams in the 2015–16 Primera División. Both the quarterfinals were single-elimination.

== Qualification ==
Location of the 2016 Copa de la Reina teams
Canary Islands location of the 2016 Copa de la Reina teams

Top eight positions of the 2015-16 Spanish First Division.

#	Team	Pld	W	D	L	GF	GA	GD	Pt	2015
1	Athletic Club	30	25	3	2	75	15	+60	78	▲2
2	Barcelona	30	24	5	1	98	12	+86	77	▼1
3	Atlético de Madrid	30	22	3	5	83	24	+59	69	▼1
4	Levante	30	16	6	8	56	38	+18	54	▲1
5	Real Sociedad	30	16	5	9	50	33	+17	53	▲6
6	Valencia	30	15	4	11	65	30	+35	49	▼2
7	Granadilla	30	14	5	11	49	44	+5	47	(N)
8	Sporting de Huelva	30	13	7	10	44	39	+5	46	Same position
9	Espanyol	30	10	6	14	28	48	-20	36	▼2
10	Rayo Vallecano	30	10	6	14	34	48	-14	36	▼4

=== Qualified teams by community ===
Autonomous community	Team/s
Andalusia	Sporting de Huelva
(Basque Country (autonomous community)) Basque Country	Athletic Club; Real Sociedad
Canary Islands	Granadilla
Catalonia	Barcelona
Community of Madrid	Atlético de Madrid
Valencian Community	Levante; Valencia

== Results ==
=== Bracket ===
Quarterfinals
5	Real Sociedad	1
2	Barcelona	5
1	Athletic Club	0
4	Levante	2
7	Granadilla	0
6	Valencia	3
3	Atlético de Madrid	7
8	Sporting de Huelva	0

Semifinals
Barcelona	3
Levante	0
Valencia	1
Atlético de Madrid	2

Final
Barcelona	2
Atlético de Madrid	3

2016 Copa de la Reina de Fútbol Champion
(Community of Madrid) Atlético de Madrid
(1st title)

=== Quarterfinals ===
18 June 2016
10:00

Real Sociedad	1–5	Barcelona
Nahikari 66'		Diéguez 30'; Putellas 33', 90+3'; Latorre 76', 89'

La Ciudad del Fútbol, Las Rozas
Referee: Miguel Gómez
18 June 2016
12:00

Athletic Club	0–2	Levante
		Oprea 56'; Corral 75'

La Ciudad del Fútbol, Las Rozas
Referee: Elia María Martínez
19 June 2016
10:00

Granadilla	0–3	Valencia
		Carreras 56'; Monforte 63' (pen.); Romero 90+3'

La Ciudad del Fútbol, Las Rozas
Referee: Zulema González
19 June 2016
12:00

Atlético de Madrid	7–0	Sporting de Huelva
Bermúdez 23', 54'; Sosa 33'; Borja 35', 60'; E. González 51'; Débora 82'

La Ciudad del Fútbol, Las Rozas
Referee: Marta Frías

=== Semifinals ===
24 June 2016
18:00

Barcelona	3–0	Levante
Diéguez 17'; Hermoso 82'; Guijarro 85'

La Ciudad del Fútbol, Las Rozas
Referee: Marta Huerta
24 June 2016
20:00

Valencia	1–2 (a.e.t.)	Atlético de Madrid
Romero 85'		Bermúdez 83', 109'

La Ciudad del Fútbol, Las Rozas
Referee: Elia María Martínez

=== Final ===
26 June 2016
11:00

Barcelona	2–3	Atlético de Madrid
Hermoso 58', 63'		Sosa 5'; Meseguer 14'; E. González 29'

La Ciudad del Fútbol, Las Rozas
Referee: Marta Frías Acedo

Barcelona	Atlético de Madrid

GK	13	(Spain) Sandra Paños
DF	2	(Spain) Ane Bergara		(substituted off) 46'
DF	3	(Spain) Ruth García
FW	4	(Spain) Marta Unzué	(yellow card) 27' (yellow-red card) 85'
FW	5	(Spain) Melanie Serrano
MF	7	(Spain) Gemma Gili		(substituted off) 52'
DF	8	(Spain) Míriam Diéguez	(yellow card) 67'
DF	11	(Spain) Alexia Putellas		(substituted off) 84'
MF	18	(Spain) Marta Torrejón
FW	10	(Spain) Jennifer Hermoso
FW	20	(Spain) Olga García		(substituted off) 46'
Substitutes:
GK	1	(Spain) Laura Ràfols
FW	12	(Spain) Patri Guijarro		(substituted on) 46'
FW	15	(Spain) Sandra Hernández		(substituted on) 84'
FW	21	(Spain) Bárbara Latorre	(yellow card) 87'	(substituted on) 46'
MF	28	(Spain) Aitana Bonmatí	(yellow card) 77'	(substituted on) 52'
MF	7	(Spain) Gemma Font
FW	17	(Spain) Irene del Río
Manager:
(Spain) Xavi Llorens

GK	1	(Spain) Lola Gallardo
DF	2	(Mexico) Kenti Robles
DF	22	(Spain) Marta Cazalla
DF	16	(Spain) Mapi León
DF	24	(Spain) María Bores		(substituted off) 90'
MF	15	(Spain) Silvia Meseguer
DF	7	(Spain) Ángela Sosa
MF	10	(Spain) Amanda Sampedro	(yellow card) 78'
MF	11	(Spain) Priscila Borja	(yellow card) 28'	(substituted off) 75'
FW	8	(Spain) Sonia Bermúdez		(substituted off) 88'
FW	9	(Spain) Esther González		(substituted off) 59'
Substitutes:
GK	13	(Spain) Noelia Gil
FW	6	(Spain) Nagore Calderón		(substituted on) 59'
MF	18	(Spain) Beatriz Beltrán		(substituted on) 75'
DF	17	(Spain) Débora García		(substituted on) 90'
DF	21	(Spain) Vanesa García		(substituted on) 88'
DF		(Spain) Marta Carro
DF		(Spain) Noelia Tudela
Manager:
(Spain) Ángel Villacampa

=== Goalscorers ===
4 goals:

- Sonia Bermúdez (Atlético de Madrid)

3 goals:

- Jennifer Hermoso (Barcelona)

2 goals:

- Priscila Borja (Atlético de Madrid)
- Esther González (Atlético de Madrid)
- Ángela Sosa (Atlético de Madrid)
- Miriam Diéguez (Barcelona)
- Bárbara Latorre (Barcelona)
- Alexia Putellas (Barcelona)
- Ana "Willy" Romero (Valencia)

1 goal:

- Débora García (Atlético de Madrid)
- Silvia Meseguer (Atlético de Madrid)
- Patricia Guijarro (Barcelona)
- Charlyn Corral (Levante)
- Olivia Oprea (Levante)
- Nahikari García (Real Sociedad)
- Georgina Carreras (Valencia)
- Sara Monforte (Valencia)
