= Mapi León =

Spanish footballer (born 1995)

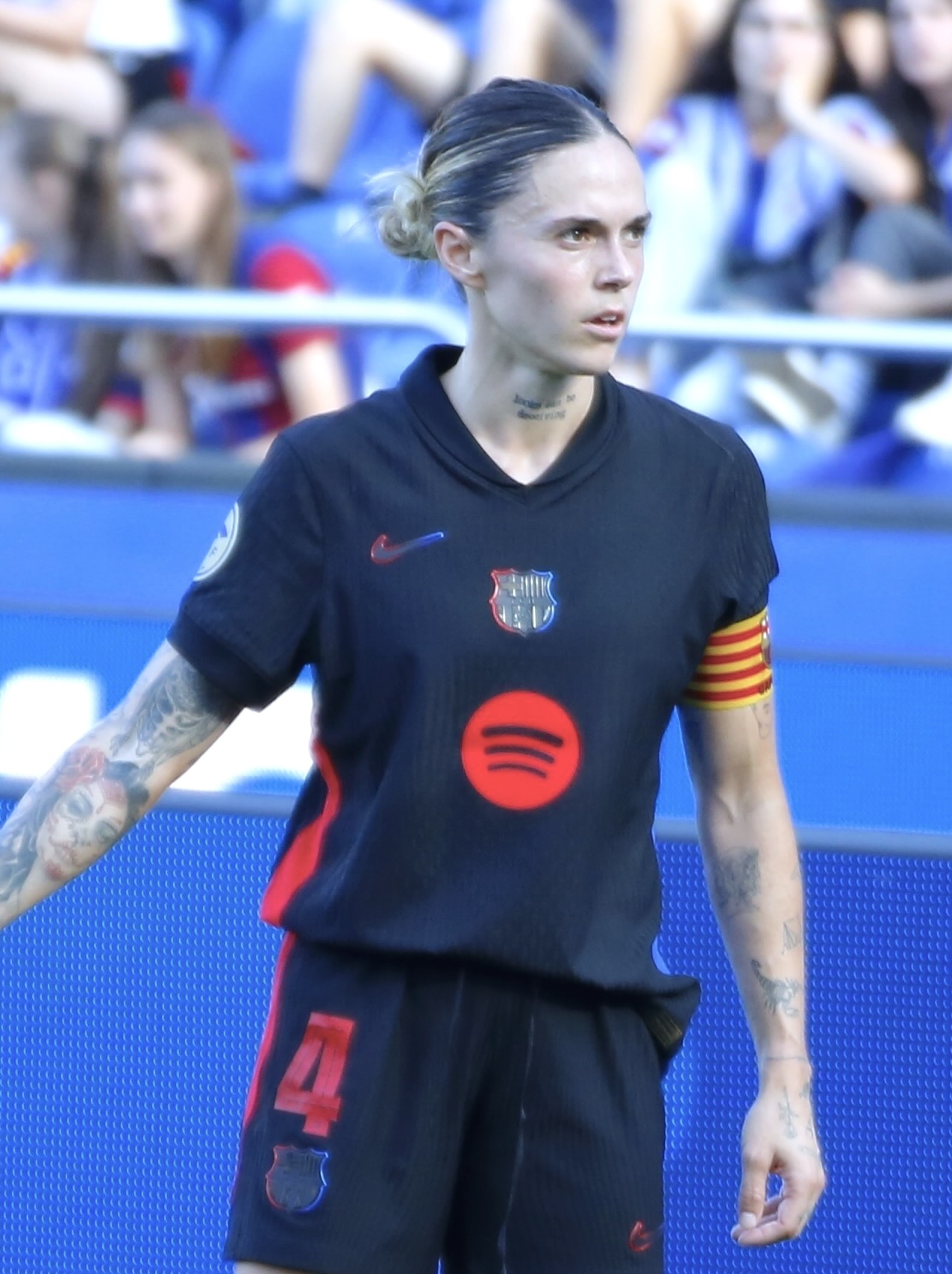
- León in 2024

Personal information
- Full name: María Pilar León Cebrián
- Date of birth: 13 June 1995 (age 31)
- Place of birth: Zaragoza, Spain
- Height: 1.69 m (5 ft 7 in)
- Positions: Left-back; centre-back

Team information
- Current team: London City Lionesses
- Number: 44

Senior career*
Years	Team	Apps	(Gls)
2009–2011	Prainsa Zaragoza B		
2011–2013	Prainsa Zaragoza	64	(6)
2013–2014	Espanyol	30	(4)
2014–2017	Atlético Madrid	84	(4)
2017–2026	Barcelona	207	(15)
2026–	London City Lionesses	1	(0)

International career^{‡}
2016–	Spain	54	(1)
- * Club domestic league appearances and goals as of 4 September 2026 ‡ National team caps and goals as of 12 October 2022

María Pilar León Cebrián (Spanish pronunciation: [maˈɾi.a piˈlaɾ leˈon θeˈβɾjan]; born 13 June 1995), known as Mapi León, (Note: Despite this, her name on her football jerseys is María León.) is a Spanish professional footballer who plays as a defender for Women's Super League club London City Lionesses and the Spain national team.

León began her career with her hometown club of Prainsa Zaragoza before moving on to Espanyol and Atlético Madrid. At Atlético, she made the transition from a left-back to a centre-back under the guidance of coach Ángel Villacampa. León won the first league and Copa de la Reina titles of her career at the club.

In 2017, León was the first paid transfer in Spanish women's football history when she signed for Barcelona from Atlético Madrid, with a fee of 50,000 euros. Domestically with Barcelona, she has won four Copas de la Reina, three league titles, and two Supercopa Femenina. On the continental stage, she has played in three Champions League finals with the club in 2019, 2021, and 2022, winning the 2021 version as part of the first continental treble in the club's history.

León plays internationally for the Spanish national team, making her debut in 2016, in qualifiers for the 2017 UEFA Euro. Since then she has featured in three major international competitions for La Roja in UEFA Euro 2017, 2019 FIFA World Cup, and UEFA Euro 2022. From 2022 to 2025, she refused to play for the Spanish national team, citing unequal and unfair conditions. She would return to the national team for the 2025 Nations League Finals.

== Early life ==
María Pilar León Cebrián was born 13 June 1995, to parents Javier and Pilar. León was raised with an older brother in La Almozara, a district of Zaragoza.

León started playing volleyball at age seven, and played many other sports as a child including baseball. Later she started playing futsal for local team Gran Vía, where she played as a winger. Around this age, she was granted a scholarship to go to an art school, but turned down the award to focus on football.

León was discovered by David Magaña, a former Zaragoza CFF sporting director, who noticed her and her brother Javi playing football while shopping in a Carrefour supermarket. She began training with the club at age 11.

== Club career ==
=== Prainsa Zaragoza (2011–2013) ===
After developing with their B team for two years, León debuted in the Primera División with Prainsa Zaragoza when she was 16. Her match debut with Zaragoza was against Barcelona.

In 2013, Zaragoza made it to the final of the Copa de la Reina, where they faced León's future club FC Barcelona. In her last ever match with the club, León started the final as Zaragoza lost 4–0 to Barcelona, who completed their first domestic double. Also in 2013, León was recognised for the first time as one of the most promising young footballers in Spain by being named to the "Golden 11" of Futbol Draft, a recognition she would earn two more times in her career.

=== Espanyol (2013–2014) ===
At 18, León joined RCD Espanyol in 2013, where she remained for only one season. She won the first trophy of her career when Espanyol outlasted FC Barcelona to win the Copa Catalunya. Around this time, she began getting call-ups with the senior national team. In addition, she attracted the attention of Atlético Madrid, who finished 3rd in the league in the 2012–13 league season.

=== Atlético Madrid (2014–2017) ===
In 2014, León joined Atlético Madrid. In her first season at the club, Atlético finished in second place in the league behind Barcelona, prompting both Atlético and León's debut in the UEFA Women's Champions League. In 2015, León debuted in the UWCL against Russian side Zorky Krasnogorsk, where they were defeated 2–0 in the first leg. Atlético later came back 3–0 to win the tie, but were defeated in the Round of 16 by Lyon on a 9–1 aggregate score.

Within her time at Atlético, León switched from playing as a left-back to playing as a centre-back under the influence of former left-back and Atlético head coach Ángel Villacampa. León won the first league title of her career in the 2016–17 season, when Atlético defeated Real Sociedad on the final matchday of the season. Her performances throughout the season earned her a place in the league's best XI of the season, as well as putting her on FC Barcelona's radar.

During the summer transfer window of 2017, Barcelona and Atlético Madrid underwent a two-month-long transfer saga in their negotiations for León. Prior to her transfer to Barcelona, she trained away from the group, and later fell ill during contract negotiations. In her episode of Barcelona's documentary series Dare to Play, Leon recounts how Atlético interpreted this as her faking an illness in an attempt to force through a move to Barcelona.

=== Barcelona (2017–2026) ===
On 24 August 2017, León's transfer to Barcelona was made official, the club's sixth signing ahead of the 2017–18 season. With a year remaining on her contract with Atlético Madrid, León signed for a fee of €50,000, becoming the first paid transfer in the history of Spanish women's football.

In her first season at the club, she won the 2018 Copa de la Reina, her first title with Barcelona. León kept a clean sheet for 120 minutes against her former club Atlético Madrid, as they won the match after a goal late in extra time.

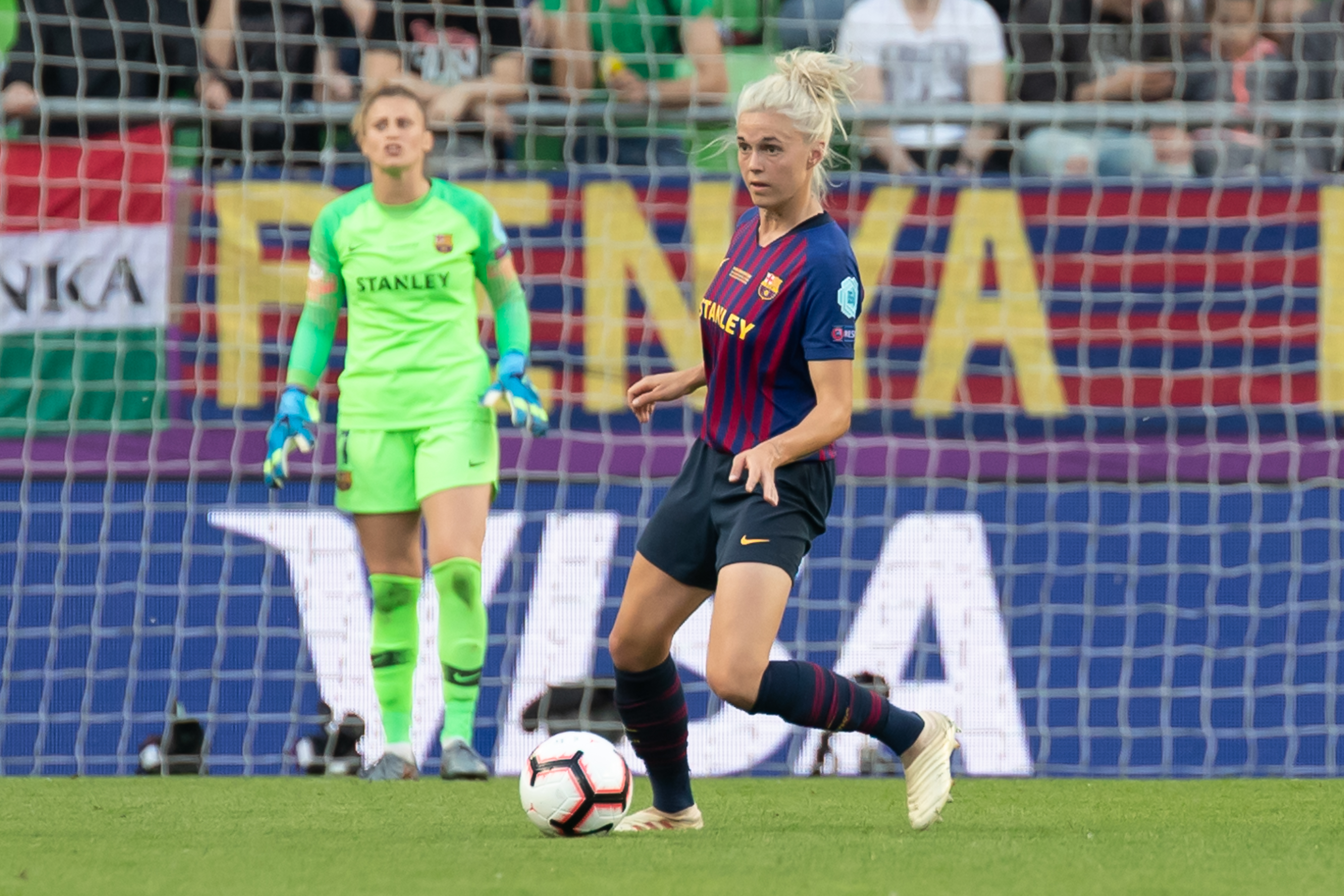
León with Barcelona during the 2019 Champions League Final

In October 2018, León scored her first ever Champions League goal in the Round of 16 against Glasgow City. In 2019, León played the first Champions League Final of her career against Lyon, where Barcelona conceded four goals within the first 30 minutes of the match, and ultimately lost 1–4 against the European giants. Following the conclusion of the Champions League, León renewed her contract with Barcelona for three more years until 2022.

In 2020, León was named as a candidate for UEFA Women's Team of the Year for the first time in her career.

On 6 January 2021, León started the first competitive match at the Camp Nou played by women's teams. She assisted Barcelona's fifth and final goal, when one of her shots was deflected off of Ana-Maria Crnogorčević and into goal. Crnogorčević personally credits the goal to León. Later in the month she competed in the 2020–21 Supercopa Femenina, where Barcelona lost on penalties against their rivals Atlético Madrid. León criticised the Royal Spanish Football Federation for not implementing video-assistant referreeing (VAR) in the competition, which the men's version of the competition does have.

In March 2021, she was suspended for four matches and fined €601 by the RFEF for criticising the quality of refereeing in the Primera Iberdrola after receiving a controversial red card against Real Madrid. Barcelona appealed the decision to the Administrative Tribunal of Sport (TAD), and León was able to play against second-place opponent Levante in their upcoming league match. Spain's footballing union, the Association of Spanish Footballers (AFE), issued a statement of support for León, calling the suspension an attempt to curtail her freedom of speech and expression. The following month, she made her 100th league appearance with Barcelona against UD Granadilla. León became a league champion with Barcelona for the second time on 9 May 2021.

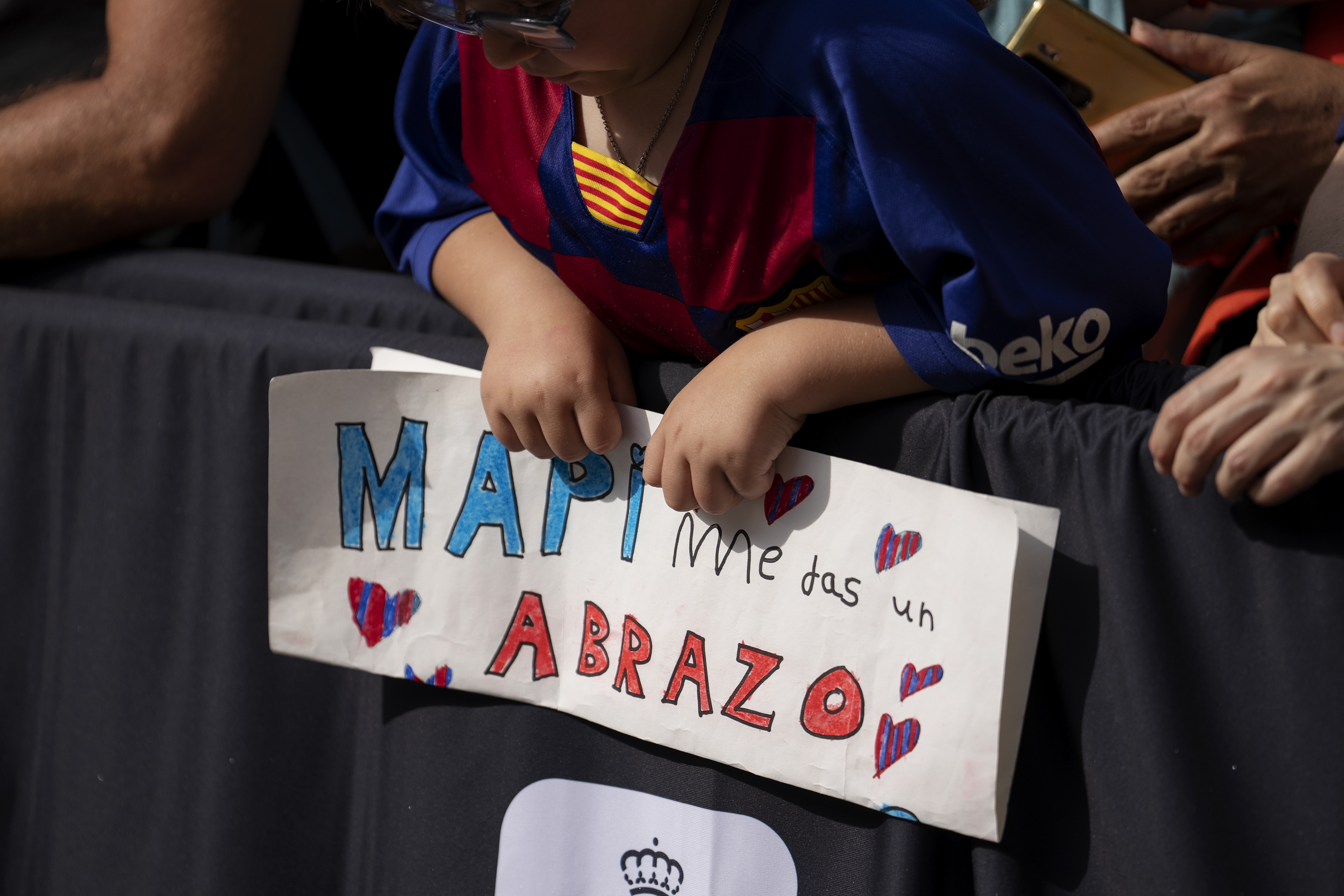
A fan holds a sign for León following the 2023 Champions League victory

Barcelona made it to the 2021 Champions League Final after defeating Paris Saint-Germain on an aggregate score of 2–1. In the second leg of the semifinal, León's centre-back partner Andrea Pereira picked up a yellow card and was suspended for the final. As expected, León played the final in a centre-back pairing alongside defensive midfielder Patri Guijarro, who studied León's game to prepare herself for the match. Barcelona's defence recorded a shutout as they won 4–0, the first UEFA Women's Champions League title in club history. León was named to the 2020–21 UEFA Women's Champions League Squad of the Season, and was later listed as a nominee to the UEFA Women's Champions League Defender of the Season award. Following the conclusion of the Champions League, León played each minute of the remaining semifinal and final of the 2021 Copa de la Reina. Barcelona won the final 4–2, achieving the continental treble for the first time in their history.

León won the league title with Barcelona for the third successive season while winning every match in the process. She also won the Copa de la Reina and Supercopa de España. She started in her team's 1–3 defeat against Lyon in the Champions League final.

On 20 November 2022, she scored on her 200th appearance for Barcelona in her team's 8–0 thrashing of Alavés in a league game.

On 3 June 2023, Mapi played the entire match as Barcelona won 3–2 against VfL Wolfsburg in the final to win her second Champions League title. She started the 2023–24 season at a high level before suffering a meniscus tear in December, a season-ending injury.

On 16 April 2025, León was banned for two Liga F games after an incident involving Colombian international and Espanyol defender Daniela Caracas during the February 2025 Catalan derby in which León was found to have "inappropriately touched" her opponent. On 28 May 2026, it was announced that she would leave the club after nine years upon the conclusion of the 2025–26 season.

=== London City Lionesses ===
On 13 July 2026, León signed a three-year contract with WSL club London City Lionesses, saying "I wanted to test myself in another country, in another league, and playing a different type of football." On 4 September 2026, she had an impressive debut in the WSL for the opening match of the season against Manchester United which ended in a 2-1 win for London City at home.

== International career ==
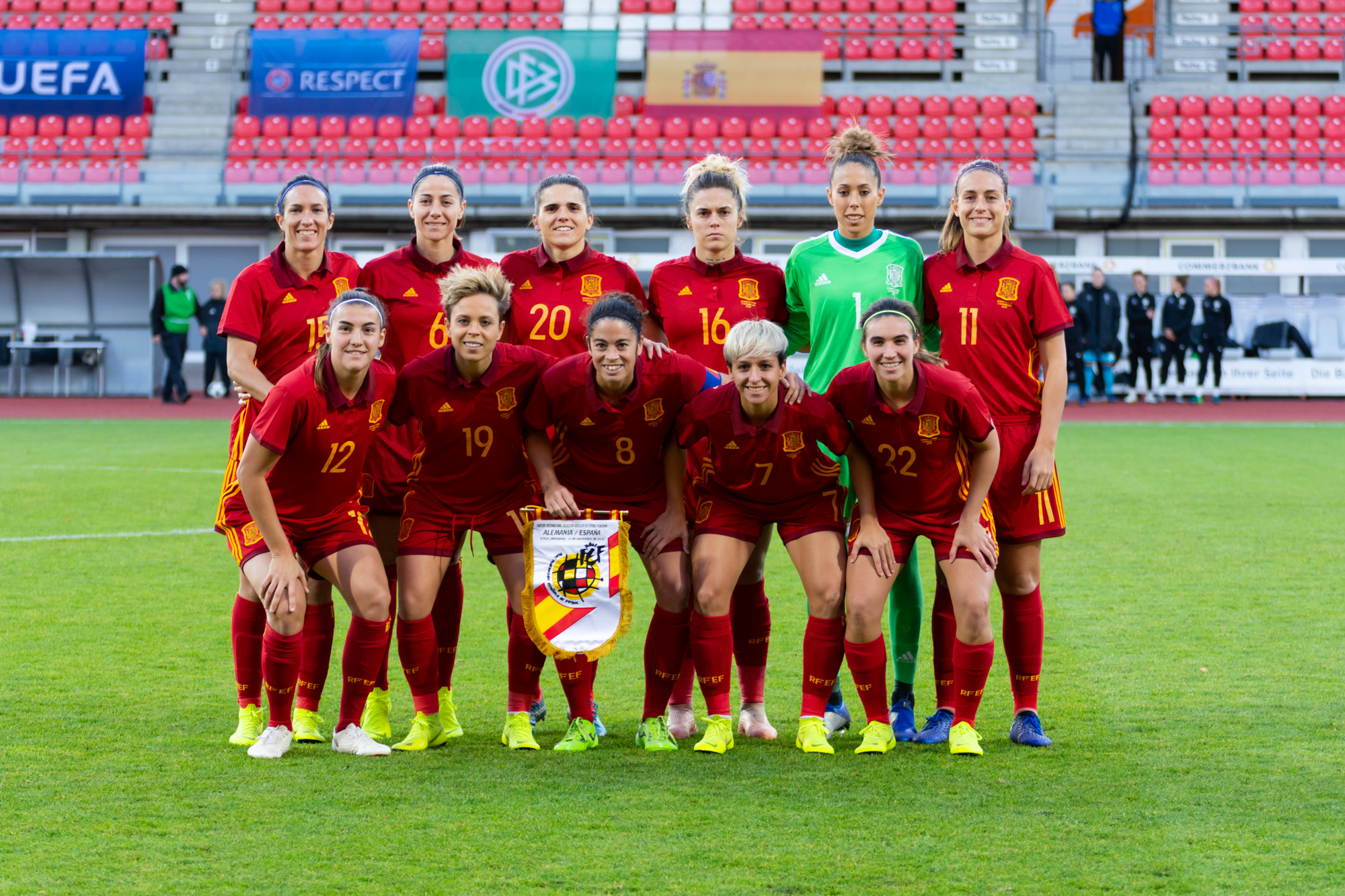
León (top row, third from right) with Spain in 2018

León's debut with Spain's senior team came about on 15 September 2016, coming on as a substitute during Spain's UEFA Euro 2017 qualifying 13–0 win against Montenegro, the second to last match of European Qualifying.

In 2017, León was called up to her first major tournament with Spain, the 2017 Euro. Spain advanced to the quarterfinals of the tournament where they were defeated by Austria on penalties. León captained Spain for the first time at the 2019 Algarve Cup.

León started all of Spain's matches at the 2019 FIFA World Cup as they made it to the Round of 16, where they faced the United States. In the 7th minute, she conceded a penalty after making contact with Tobin Heath in the box, which Megan Rapinoe scored to put the USA 1–0 up. The match ended 2–1 in favour of the United States as Spain exited the tournament.

In 2021, Spain played in a 3–0 win against Poland in UEFA Euro 2022 qualifying, where León scored for the first time in her career with the Spain national team. The same match, she wore her mother's maiden name Cebrián on her shirt.

The following year in July, León participated in the 2022 Euro, where Spain were eliminated in the quarterfinals by eventual champions England. In September, León joined 14 of her teammates in abstaining from national team call-ups, a decision that arose from a conflict between the 15 players and Spain's coach, Jorge Vilda. The group, dubbed Las 15 by Spanish media, later posted a joint statement that explained their decision to leave, citing difficulties with their physical and mental health, and criticised the Spanish federation for their response to the situation. León continued to refuse call-ups to the national team into 2023 and even refused to make herself available for selection for the 2023 World Cup. Regarding the situation, she said in an interview "Mapi León has a way of life and values. I can't go back if the situation hasn't changed. There have to be changes. I'm not saying that no changes have happened, but I don't see them."

In October 2025, after three years away from the national team, León received a call-up from newly appointed Spain manager Sonia Bermúdez for the 2025 Nations League Finals.

== Style of play ==
León is a versatile left-footed defender, possessing the ability to play as both a left-back and a centre-back. She is mostly utilised as a ball-playing centre-back, with her main characteristics as a player being her quality technique and passing. FIFA profiles her as an aggressive player with good reactions and reading of the game. Former Atletico Madrid manager Ángel Villacampa, who aided her transition from left-back to centre-back, has described León as having the perfect connection to Barcelona’s style, with her ability to distribute the ball up the pitch and her preference for playing in a high block.

== Personal life ==
In 2018, León came out publicly as a lesbian in an interview with the Spanish newspaper El Mundo after being out for many years in her personal life. In the same interview, she spoke in disapproval of the 2018 FIFA World Cup being hosted in Russia due to anti-gay purges in Chechnya. In 2019, León was a headline speaker for the commencement of Madrid Pride. El Mundo labelled her as one of Spain's top 50 most influential LGBT people in 2018 and 2019. In 2021, she was a part of Levi's Beauty of Becoming campaign for LGBT Pride month. As of May 2026, she is in a relationship, which began in 2021, with former Barcelona teammate and Norwegian international Ingrid Syrstad Engen.

León has a passion for motorcycles, which she inherited from her father, a mechanic.

She has an interest in drawing and painting, and has multiple tattoos. Her first tattoo was a small one on her foot, which she purposefully got in a discreet area to hide from her parents. One of her most prominent tattoos is that on her neck, which reads "Looks can be deceiving." She practices tattooing on her own hands and feet, and in 2021 was interning at a tattoo shop. In 2019, she said she would like to focus on her tattoos and tattoo design after retiring from football.

== Career statistics ==
=== Club ===
Appearances and goals by club, season and competition
Club	Season	League		Copa de la Reina de Fútbol		UEFA Women's Champions League		Supercopas Spain		Copa Catalonia		Total	
Club	Season	Apps	Goals	Apps	Goals	Apps	Goals	Apps	Goals	Apps	Goals	Apps	Goals
Zaragoza	2010–11	4	0	2	0	–		–		–		6	0
Zaragoza	2011–12	32	4	–		–		–		–		32	4
Zaragoza	2012–13	28	2	5	1	–		–		–		32	3
Zaragoza	Total	64	6	7	1	0	0	0	0	0	0	71	7
Espanyol	2013–14	30	4	–		–		–		–		30	4
Atlético	2014–15	29	0	2	0	–		–		–		37	2
Atlético	2015–16	28	1	3	0	4	0	–		–		44	2
Atlético	2016–17	27	3	3	0	–		–		–		30	0
Atlético	Total	84	4	8	0	4	0	0	0	0	0	96	4
Barcelona	2017–18	29	2	3	0	5	0	–		0	0	37	2
Barcelona	2018–19	30	1	3	0	9	1	–		2	0	44	2
Barcelona	2019–20	19	0	2	0	5	0	2	0	2	0	30	0
Barcelona	2020–21	27	3	5	0	9	0	1	0	–		42	3
Barcelona	2021–22	22	2	4	1	9	1	1	0	–		36	4
Barcelona	2022–23	25	3	0	0	11	2	2	0	–		38	5
Barcelona	2023–24	10	1	0	0	2	0	0	0	–		12	1
Barcelona	2024–25	26	1	3	0	10	2	2	0	1	0	42	3
Barcelona	2025–26	19	2	1	0	11	0	2	0	0	0	33	2
Barcelona	Total	207	15	21	1	71	6	10	0	5	0	314	22
Total		385	29	36	2	75	6	10	0	5	0	511	37

=== International ===
Mapi León – goals for Spain
#	Date	Venue	Opponent	Score	Result	Competition
1.	23 February 2021	La Ciudad del Fútbol, Las Rozas de Madrid	Poland	3–0	3–0	UEFA Women's Euro 2021 qualifying

== Honours ==
Espanyol

- Copa Catalunya: 2013

Atletico Madrid

- Primera División: 2016–17
- Copa de la Reina: 2016

Barcelona

- Primera División: 2019–20, 2020–21, 2021–22, 2022–23, 2023–24, 2024–25, 2025–26
- Copa de la Reina: 2018, 2019–20, 2020–21, 2021–22, 2023–24, 2024–25, 2025–26
- Supercopa de España: 2019–20, 2021–22, 2022–23, 2024–25, 2025–26
- Copa Catalunya: 2018, 2019
- UEFA Women's Champions League: 2020–21, 2022–23, 2023–24, 2025–26

Spain

- Algarve Cup: 2017
- SheBelieves Cup: runner-up 2020
- Arnold Clark Cup: runner-up 2022
- UEFA Women's Nations League: 2025

Individual

- Fútbol Draft: 2013, 2015, 2016
- Primera División Best XI of the Season: 2016–17
- UEFA Women's Champions League Squad of the Season: 2020–21, 2024–25, 2025–26
- FIFA FIFPRO Women's World 11: 2022
- IFFHS Women's UEFA Team: 2021,
