= Javi Paños =

Spanish footballer

Personal information
- Full name: Javier Paños García-Villamil
- Date of birth: 21 March 1991 (age 35)
- Place of birth: Alicante, Spain
- Height: 1.88 m (6 ft 2 in)
- Position: Midfielder

Youth career
- Elche

Senior career*
| Years | Team | Apps | (Gls) |
| 2009–2012 | Elche B | 39 | (1) |
| 2010–2012 | Elche | 10 | (0) |
| 2010–2011 | → Torrellano Illice (loan) | 33 | (4) |
| 2012–2013 | Jove Español | 35 | (2) |
| 2014–2015 | Jove Español | 28 | (1) |
- * Club domestic league appearances and goals as of 15 May 2021

Javier 'Javi' Paños García-Villamil (born 21 March 1991 in Alicante) is a Spanish former footballer who last played for FC Jove Español San Vicente as a midfielder.

== Club career ==
A product of Elche CF's youth system, Paños was promoted to the main squad for the 2009–10 season, in the second division, as well as still appearing for the reserves. He made his first-team debut on 10 April 2010, in a 3–0 away win against Real Unión, and ended the campaign with four appearances, one as a starter.

In the following season, Paños was loaned to another team in the city, amateurs Torrellano Illice CF. He returned to his parent club late into the season, appearing against Xerez CD.

In 2012 summer Paños was released by the Valencians, and signed with FC Jove Español San Vicente, in Tercera División. Paños played for Jove Español for two seasons before retiring in 2015.

== Personal life ==
He is the brother of Sandra, an international footballer with Spain women's national football team who plays for FC Barcelona in the Primera División.
