= Silvia Meseguer =

Spanish footballer (born 1989)

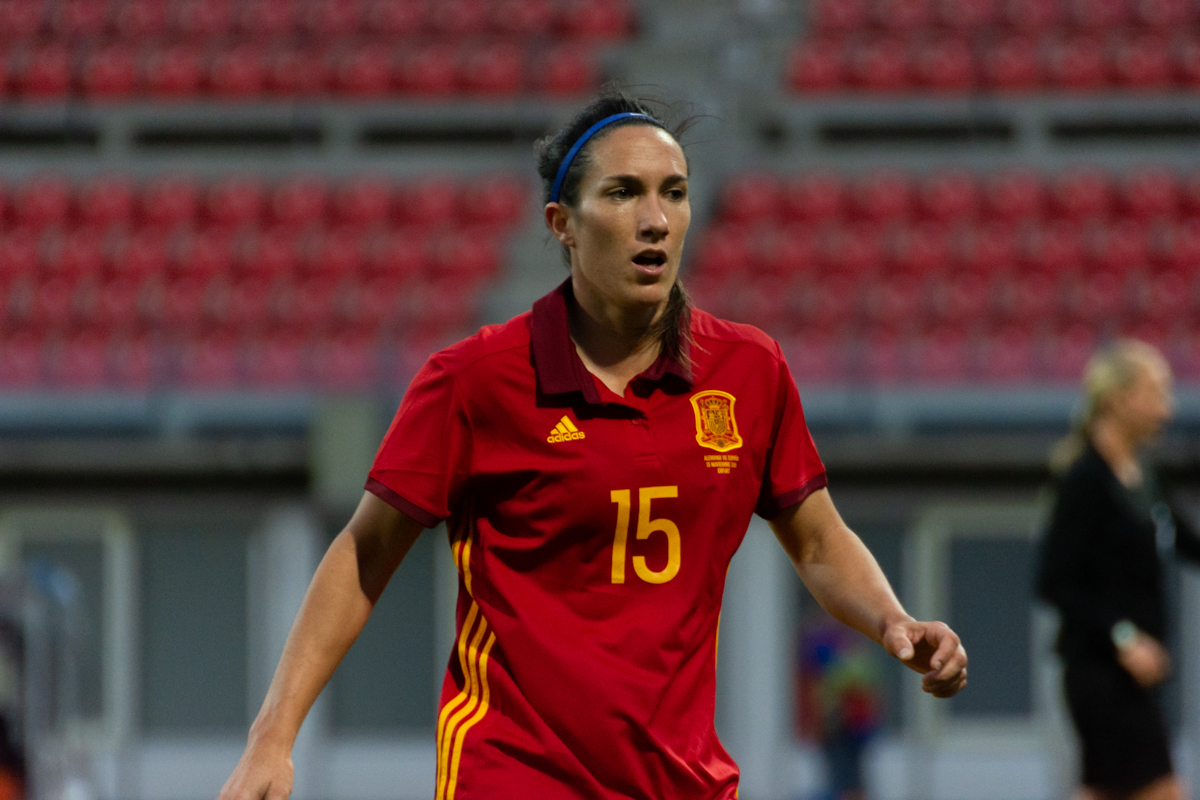
- Meseguer playing for Spain in 2018

Personal information
- Full name: Silvia Meseguer Bellido
- Date of birth: 12 March 1989 (age 37)
- Place of birth: Alcañiz, Aragon, Spain
- Height: 1.69 m (5 ft 7 in)
- Position: Midfielder

Senior career*
Years	Team	Apps	(Gls)
2005–2008	Prainsa Zaragoza	71	(4)
2008–2013	Espanyol	144	(9)
2013–2022	Atlético Madrid	225	(16)
2022-2023	Sevilla FC	30	(3)

International career
2008–2019	Spain	66	(5)
- * Club domestic league appearances and goals

Silvia Meseguer Bellido (born 12 March 1989) is a Spanish former professional footballer who played as a midfielder.

== Club career ==
She previously played for Prainsa Zaragoza and Espanyol.

== International career ==
She is a member of the Spanish national team, having made her debut in a 2–2 draw with England in October 2008. In June 2013 national team coach Ignacio Quereda selected Meseguer in the squad for UEFA Women's Euro 2013 in Sweden. She played every minute of Spain's campaign, which ended with a 3–1 defeat to Norway in the quarter-finals.

Silvia was part of Spain's squad for the 2015 FIFA Women's World Cup in Canada.

== International goals ==
No.	Date	Venue	Opponent	Score	Result	Competition
1.	19 September 2009	Centenary Stadium, Ta' Qali, Malta	Malta	1–0	13–0	2011 FIFA Women's World Cup qualification
2.	27 October 2011	BIIK Stadium, Shymkent, Kazakhstan	Kazakhstan	4–0	4–0	UEFA Women's Euro 2013 qualifying
3.	24 October 2012	La Ciudad del Fútbol, Madrid, Spain	Scotland	2–2	3–2 (a.e.t.)	UEFA Women's Euro 2013 qualifying play-off round
4.	18 September 2015	Weinan Sports Center Stadium, Weinan, China	China	3–1	3–1	Friendly
5.	5 March 2017	Bela Vista Municipal Stadium, Parchal, Portugal	Japan	1–0	2–1	2017 Algarve Cup

== Honours ==
=== Club ===
RCD Espanyol

- Copa de la Reina de Fútbol: Winner 2009, 2010, 2012

Atlético Madrid

- Primera División: Winner 2016–17, 2017–18
- Copa de la Reina de Fútbol: Winner 2016

Spain

- Algarve Cup: Winner 2017
