= Sandra Paños =

Spanish footballer (born 1992)

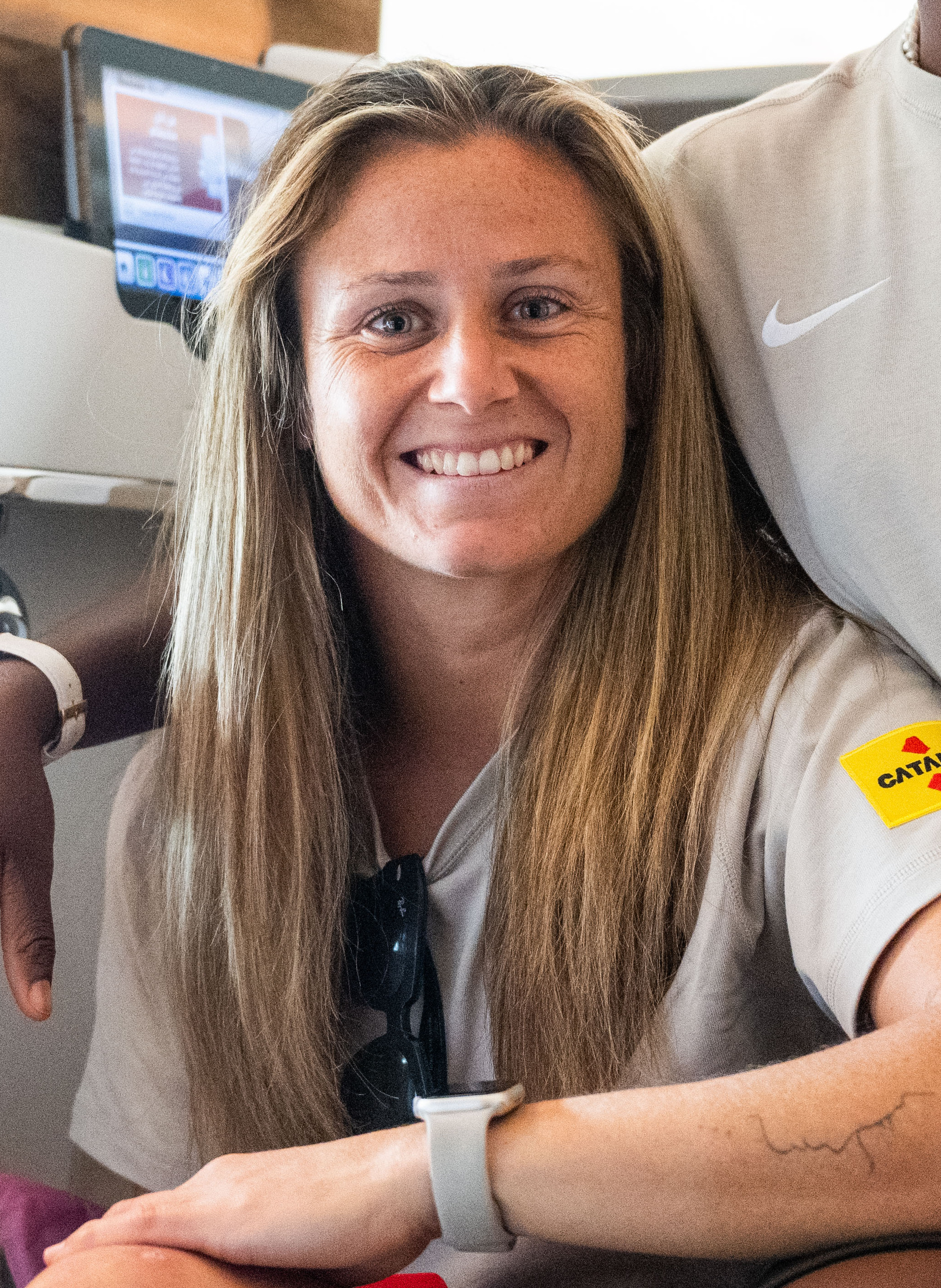
- Paños in 2023

Personal information
- Full name: Sandra Paños García-Villamil
- Date of birth: 4 November 1992 (age 34)
- Place of birth: Alicante, Spain
- Height: 1.69 m (5 ft 7 in)
- Position: Goalkeeper

Team information
- Current team: San Diego Wave
- Number: 12

Youth career
- 2002–2010: Sporting Plaza de Argel

Senior career*
| Years | Team | Apps | (Gls) |
| 2010–2015 | Levante | 114 | (1) |
| 2015–2024 | Barcelona | 169 | (0) |
| 2024–2026 | América | 72 | (0) |
| 2026– | San Diego Wave | 14 | (0) |

International career^{‡}
| 2008–2009 | Spain U17 | 6 | (0) |
| 2010–2011 | Spain U19 | 16 | (0) |
| 2012–2022 | Spain | 54 | (0) |
- * Club domestic league appearances and goals as of 16:44, 15 November 2026 (UTC) ‡ National team caps and goals as of 23:30, 31 July 2022 (UTC)

Sandra Paños García-Villamil (Spanish pronunciation: [ˈsandɾa ˈpaɲos ɣaɾˈθi.a βiʎaˈmil]; born 4 November 1992) is a Spanish professional footballer who plays as a goalkeeper for San Diego Wave FC of the National Women's Soccer League (NWSL). She has previously played for Liga F teams Levante (for five years) and Barcelona (for nine), where she was a captain, before joining Club América in the Liga MX Femenil. She also played for the Spain national team for a decade, accumulating over 50 caps.

Paños is recognised as one of Spain's best women's goalkeepers, winning a record four Zamora Trophies; with Barcelona she won the league, Copa de la Reina, Supercopa de España and UEFA Women's Champions League on multiple occasions. Internationally, she represented Spain at three major tournaments: the 2015 FIFA Women's World Cup, the 2017 UEFA Women's Euro, and the 2019 FIFA Women's World Cup.

== Early and personal life ==
Sandra Paños García-Villamil was born on 4 November 1992, to Luis Ernesto Paños and Gemma García-Villamil. Paños began playing as a goalkeeper when there was a vacant position in goal for her futsal team. She later played 7-a-side football before playing for her first club, Sporting Plaza de Argel (formerly known as Hércules), when she was 10 years old. Her father formerly played for Hércules in the 1980s. Her older brother, Javi, was also a footballer.

On June 12, 2026. She is married to coach and former player Sara Mérida.

== Club career ==
=== Levante (2010–2015) ===
In 2010, Paños made the jump to the Spanish first division when she signed for Levante. Despite offers from Atlético Madrid, she chose Levante because of the club's proximity to her hometown of Alicante. After a successful first season, she renewed her contract with the club in 2011 until 2012.

On 4 June 2015, Paños scored the first and only goal of her career with a free-kick from midfield against Espanyol; taken in the 87th minute to put Levante 3–2 up, it was the match-winning goal.

=== Barcelona (2015–2024) ===
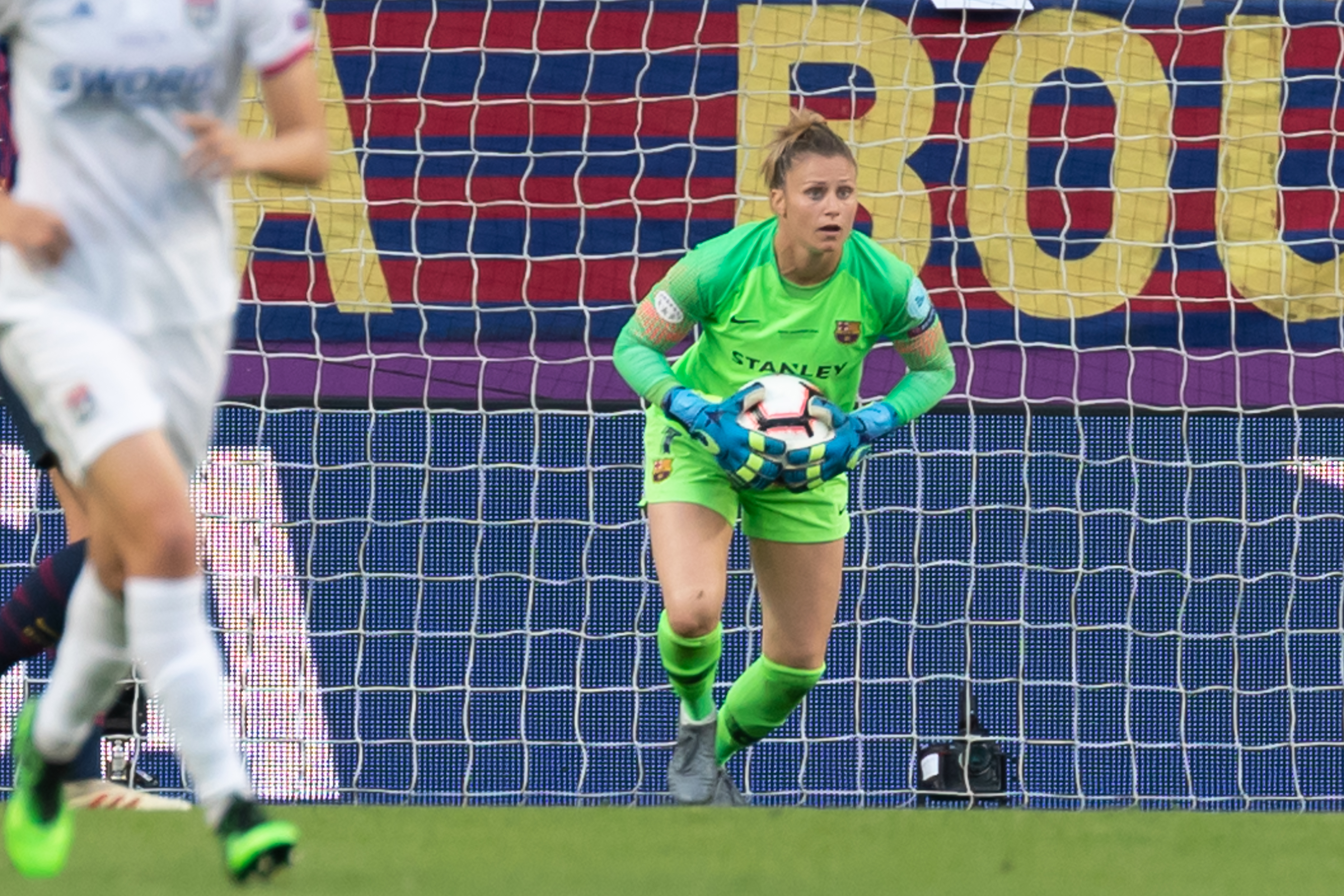
Paños with Barcelona during the 2019 UEFA Women's Champions League final

At 22 years old, Paños moved from Levante to Barcelona after the 2015 FIFA Women's World Cup, the summer that the Catalan club professionalised their women's side. In her first Champions League season, Panos was named to the UEFA Women's Champions League Squad of the season, the first ever Barcelona player to do so. She was also the recipient of her first Zamora Trophy.

In the 2017–18 season at Barcelona, she received her second Zamora Trophy for conceding just 12 goals in 26 league matches. Paños shared goalkeeping duties with Laura Ràfols until Ràfols' retirement in 2018. The season following Ràfols' departure, she picked up a captaincy role for the first time in blaugrana and was named the club's third captain. In 2019, Paños was given her third Zamora Trophy award, conceding a personal-best 11 goals in the 2018–19 league season. For the 2019–20 season, her role as captain was decreased to fourth captain as Alexia Putellas made the jump to second captain.

In 2020, following the premature end of the 2019–20 league season due to the COVID-19 pandemic, Paños was awarded her fourth Zamora Trophy, a record number. That season, she conceded a personal-best 0.26 goals per game.

In the quarterfinals of the UEFA Women's Champions League, Paños saved a penalty from Manchester City’s Chloe Kelly and recorded a clean sheet in a 3–0 win. In May 2021, Paños extended her Barcelona contract to June 2024. Days after announcing her contract extension, she started the second Champions League final of her career and recorded a clean sheet against Chelsea, as the team won the match 4–0. Paños was named to the 2020–21 UEFA Women's Champions League Squad of the Season, and later won the 2020–21 UEFA Women's Champions League Goalkeeper of the Season award. At the end of the 2020–21 league season, she had conceded a league-best 12 goals. Paños was ineligible to win the Zamora Trophy however, as she suffered a thigh injury in October 2020 that kept her out of play for three months, and did not complete in at least 28 matches.

Paños returned to her role as Barcelona's third captain ahead of the 2021–22 season, after regular captain Vicky Losada moved to Manchester City. In October 2021, she was named as a nominee to the 2021 Ballon d'or. On 31 October, Paños played in her 200th match for Barcelona in all competitions as her side won 8–1 against Real Sociedad.

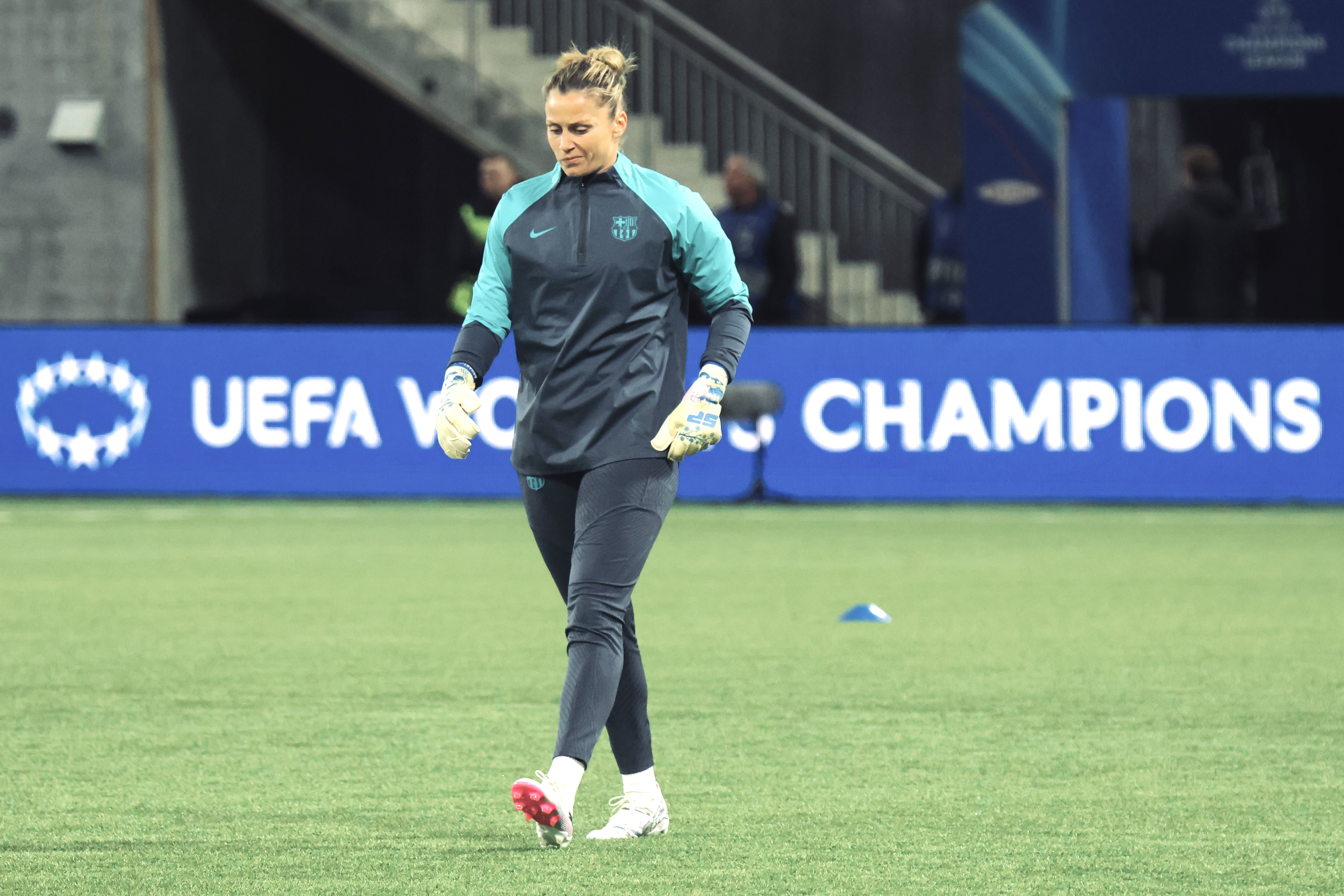
Paños with Barcelona in March 2024

On 2 February 2024, Paños announced that she would be leaving Barcelona at the end of the 2023–24 season after nine years and 23 trophies with the club. During her time at Barcelona, Paños conceded 142 goals in 279 appearances, the eighth most appearances in the team's history; she kept 171 clean sheets. In her final season, after Cata Coll's breakthrough, Paños had a reduced role. She still made appearances in all competitions, performing at a high level, and was recognised for not complaining about fewer minutes.

=== Club América (2024–2026) ===
On 23 June 2024, Liga MX Femenil side Club América announced the signing of Paños. At América, the goalkeeper position in the started line-up was initially rotated between Paños and America's second goal keeper Itzel Velasco. Paños became the main goalkeeper of the team for the rest of the 2024–2025 season after Velasco suffered a serious long-term injury in July 2024. During the Apertura 2024 tournament playoffs, Paños committed a major mistake during the semi-finals second leg game against Tigres, that directly led to Tigres scoring their second goal of the series. America was able to tied the match and the series at the end, but the team was eliminated due to seeding. Paños was heavily criticized for her mistake.

During the Clausura 2026 tournament, Paños played a key role for América to finish first in the standings during the regular phase and to win the championship. For her performance during the final, the league awarded Paños the Goalkeeper of the Final award. Right after lifting the league trophy, Paños announced to thew press that she was departing the club after the conclusion of her contract in June 2026. América officially announced Paños' departure on 7 June 2026.

Paños went on to appear in 72 league matches for América and had the second-best goals-against record in the league in 2026.

=== San Diego Wave (2026–present) ===
In June 2026, American National Women's Soccer League club San Diego Wave FC signed Paños to a three-year deal through 2028.

== International career ==
She was the first-choice goalkeeper at the 2009 U-17 Euro and the 2010 and 2011 U-19 Euros.

In September 2011, she was called to Spain's senior national team for the first time, replacing injured María José Pons. Five months later she made her debut in a friendly against Austria. She was a part of Spain's squad at the 2015 FIFA Women's World Cup, where she was Spain's third keeper.

Since Jorge Vilda's takeover of the national team in 2017, Paños has been a regular starter with Spain. She started each of Spain's four matches at the UEFA Women's Euro 2017, captaining the side in their final match of Group D against Scotland. Spain advanced to the quarterfinals but were eliminated in a penalty shoot-out by Austria, who scored all 5 of their penalties.

Despite having rotated with Lola Gallardo in goal during warm-up matches for the 2019 FIFA Women's World Cup, Paños started all four of Spain's matches of the final tournament. Spain advanced to the knockout round of a Women's World Cup for the first time in their history, facing the United States in the Round of 16. Paños faced two penalties, both of which were scored by Megan Rapinoe, and the United States won the match 2–1.

Paños was among Las 15, the fifteen players who withdrew from international selection during a dispute with the Spanish federation in 2022; though reportedly being open to return for the 2023 World Cup, the coach had chosen a new starting goalkeeper during her absence and did not want to introduce tension in competing for the role, omitting Paños and calling up her Barcelona number two, Cata Coll instead.

== Career statistics ==
=== Club ===
As of 17 June 2026

Appearances and goals by club, season and competition
| Club | Season | League | | | National Cup (Note: Appearances in Copa de la Reina) | | Other (Note: Appearances in Supercopa de España and Summer Cup) | | Continental (Note: Appearances in UEFA Women's Champions League and CONCACAF W Champions Cup) | | Total | |
| Club | Season | Division | Apps | Goals | Apps | Goals | Apps | Goals | Apps | Goals | Apps | Goals |
|---|---|---|---|---|---|---|---|---|---|---|---|---|
| Levante | 2010–11 | Superliga | 12 | 0 | 2 | 0 | – | | – | | 14 | 0 |
| Levante | 2011–12 | Primera División | 13 | 0 | – | | – | | – | | 13 | 0 |
| Levante | 2012–13 | Primera División | 29 | 0 | 4 | 0 | – | | – | | 33 | 0 |
| Levante | 2013–14 | Primera División | 30 | 0 | 4 | 0 | – | | – | | 34 | 0 |
| Levante | 2014–15 | Primera División | 30 | 1 | 1 | 0 | – | | – | | 31 | 1 |
| Levante | Total | | 114 | 1 | 11 | 0 | 0 | 0 | 0 | 0 | 125 | 1 |
| Barcelona | 2015–16 | Primera División | 18 | 0 | 3 | 0 | – | | 4 | 0 | 25 | 0 |
| Barcelona | 2016–17 | Primera División | 22 | 0 | 3 | 0 | – | | 7 | 0 | 32 | 0 |
| Barcelona | 2017–18 | Primera División | 27 | 0 | 4 | 0 | – | | 5 | 0 | 36 | 0 |
| Barcelona | 2018–19 | Primera División | 27 | 0 | 3 | 0 | – | | 9 | 0 | 39 | 0 |
| Barcelona | 2019–20 | Primera División | 19 | 0 | 2 | 0 | 2 | 0 | 5 | 0 | 28 | 0 |
| Barcelona | 2020–21 | Primera División | 5 | 0 | 3 | 0 | 1 | 0 | 7 | 0 | 16 | 0 |
| Barcelona | 2021–22 | Primera División | 17 | 0 | 4 | 0 | 2 | 0 | 10 | 0 | 33 | 0 |
| Barcelona | 2022–23 | Liga F | 20 | 0 | 0 | 0 | 2 | 0 | 6 | 0 | 28 | 0 |
| Barcelona | 2023–24 | Liga F | 14 | 0 | 3 | 0 | 0 | 0 | 3 | 0 | 20 | 0 |
| Barcelona | Total | | 169 | 0 | 22 | 0 | 7 | 0 | 56 | 0 | 254 | 0 |
| Club América | 2024–25 | Liga MX Femenil | 37 | 0 | – | | 3 | 0 | 6 | 0 | 46 | 0 |
| Club América | 2025–26 | Liga MX Femenil | 35 | 0 | — | | 0 | 0 | 2 | 0 | 37 | 0 |
| Club América | Total | | 72 | 0 | – | | 3 | 0 | 8 | 0 | 83 | 0 |
| Career total | | | 355 | 1 | 33 | 0 | 10 | 0 | 64 | 0 | 462 | 1 |

=== International ===
As of match played 6 September 2022

Appearances and goals by national team and year
| National Team | Year | Apps | Goals |
|---|---|---|---|
| Spain | 2011 | 1 | 0 |
| Spain | 2012 | ? | 0 |
| Spain | 2013 | ? | 0 |
| Spain | 2014 | ? | 0 |
| Spain | 2015 | 6 | 0 |
| Spain | 2016 | 7 | 0 |
| Spain | 2017 | 13 | 0 |
| Spain | 2018 | 8 | 0 |
| Spain | 2019 | 15 | 0 |
| Spain | 2020 | 4 | 0 |
| Spain | 2021 | 11 | 0 |
| Spain | 2022 | 13 | 0 |
| Total | | 78 | 0 |

== Honours ==
Barcelona

- Primera División: 2019–20, 2020–21, 2021–22, 2022–23, 2023–24
- UEFA Women's Champions League: 2020–21, 2022–23, 2023–24
- Copa de la Reina: 2017, 2018, 2019–20, 2020–21, 2021–22, 2023–24
- Supercopa de España Femenina: 2019–20, 2021–22, 2022–23, 2023–24
- Copa Catalunya: 2016, 2017, 2018, 2019

Club América

- Liga MX Femenil: Clausura 2026
- CONCACAF W Champions Cup: 2025–26

Spain U17

- UEFA Women's Under-17 Championship: 2010

Spain

- Algarve Cup: 2017
- Cyprus Cup: 2018

Individual

- Zamora Trophy: 2015–16, 2017–18, 2018–19, 2019–20
- UEFA Women's Champions League Squad of the Season: 2015–16, 2017–18, 2018–19, 2019–20, 2020–21
- UEFA Women's Champions League Goalkeeper of the Season: 2020–21
- IFFHS Women's UEFA Team: 2021,

== See also ==
- List of goalscoring goalkeepers
- List of Spanish association football families
- List of FC Barcelona Femení players
