= Captain (association football) =

Team captain of a football team

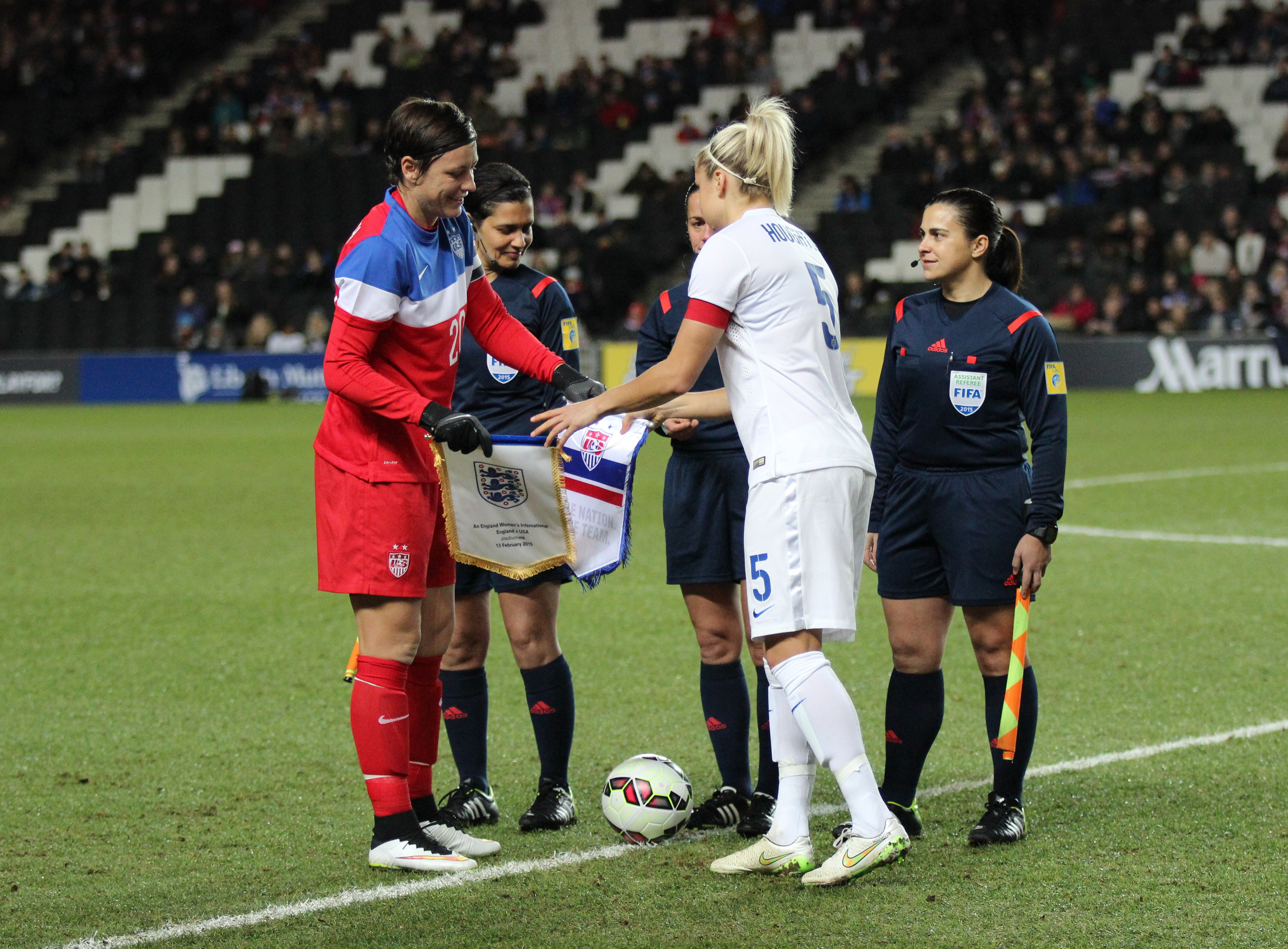
United States captain Abby Wambach (left, in red) and England captain Steph Houghton (right, in white) shake hands before kickoff, 2015

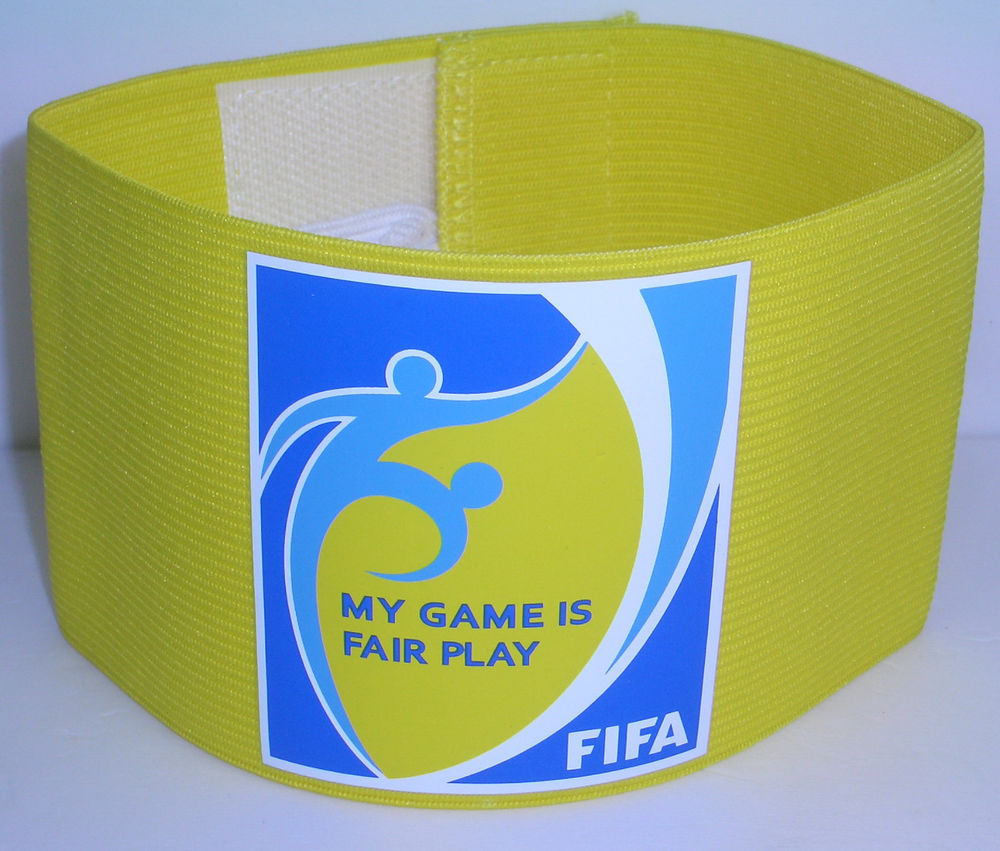
A captain's armband with FIFA's "My Game is Fair Play" slogan printed on it

The captain of an association football team, sometimes known as the skipper, is a team member chosen to be the on-pitch leader of the team; they are often one of the older or more experienced members of the squad, or a player that can heavily influence a game or has good leadership qualities. The team captain is usually identified by the wearing of an armband. In the 2024/25 edition of the Laws of the Game, it was made mandatory for each team to have a captain and each captain to be identified by the previously traditional but non-mandatory captain's armband.

== Responsibilities ==
The only official responsibility of a captain specified by the Laws of the Game is to participate in the coin toss prior to kick-off (for choice of ends or to have kick-off) and prior to a penalty shoot-out. Captains have no special authority under the Laws to challenge a decision by the referee. However, referees may talk to the captain of a side about the side's general behaviour when necessary.

At an award-giving ceremony after a fixture like a cup competition final, the captain usually leads the team up to collect their medals. Any trophy won by a team will be received by the captain, who will also be the first one to hoist it. The captain also generally leads the teams out of the dressing room at the start of the match. A captain is also tasked with running the dressing room.

The captain generally provides a rallying point for the team: if morale is low, it is the captain who will be looked upon to boost their team's spirits.

Captains may join the manager in deciding the starting eleven for a certain game. In youth or recreational football, the captain often takes on duties that would, at a higher level, be delegated to the manager.

== Club ==
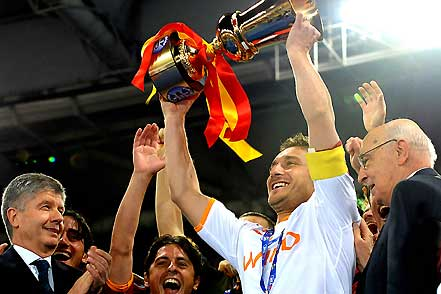
Francesco Totti, Roma captain, lifting the 2007–08 Coppa Italia

A club captain is usually appointed for a season. If they are unavailable or not selected for a particular game, or must leave the pitch, then the club vice-captain will assume similar duties.

The match captain is the first player to lift a trophy should the team win one, even if they are not the club captain. A good example of this was in the 1999 UEFA Champions League Final when match captain Peter Schmeichel lifted the trophy for Manchester United as club captain Roy Keane was suspended. In the 2012 UEFA Champions League Final, match captain Frank Lampard (who was the vice-captain) jointly lifted the trophy for Chelsea with club captain John Terry, who was suspended, but given permission by UEFA.

A club may appoint two distinct roles: a club captain to represent the players in a public relations role, and correspondent on the pitch. Manchester United has had both of these types of captains: Roy Keane was the club captain on and off the pitch from 1997 to 2005 as he was a regular in the starting eleven, but his successor Gary Neville while nominally club captain from 2005 to 2010 had made few first team appearances due to injuries. In his absence other players (Rio Ferdinand or vice-captain Ryan Giggs) were chosen to captain the team on the field, such as in the 2008 (Ferdinand was captain as he was in the starting eleven, while Giggs was a substitute) and 2009 UEFA Champions League Finals, respectively. After Neville retired in 2011, regular starter Nemanja Vidić was named as club captain.

=== Vice-captain ===
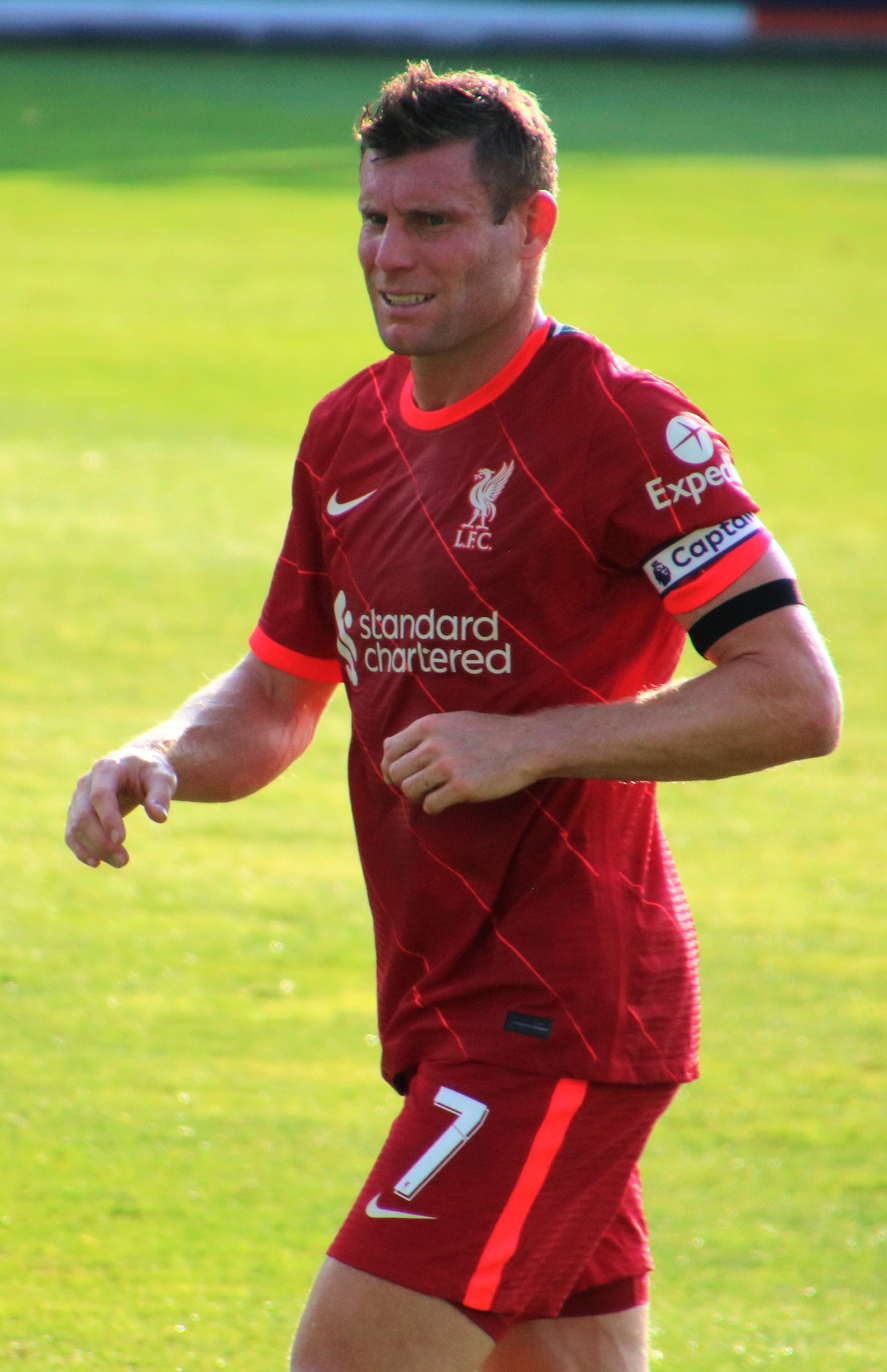
James Milner, vice-captain of Liverpool from 2015 to 2023. As depicted in the image, vice-captains serve as their team's captain when the regular captain is not included in the starting eleven, or if, during a game, the captain is substituted or sent off.

A vice-captain (or assistant captain) is a player that is expected to captain the side when the club's captain is not included in the starting eleven, or if, during a game, the captain is substituted or sent off. Examples include Pedri at Barcelona, Joshua Kimmich at Bayern Munich, and Vinícius Júnior at Real Madrid.

Similarly, some clubs also name a 3rd captain, a 4th captain, or even a 5th captain to take the role of captain when both the captain and vice-captain are unavailable. Examples include Eric Garcia as a 3rd captain and Frenkie De Jong as a 4th captain for Barcelona. In their 2015–16 season, Barcelona Femení had six named captains.

== International ==
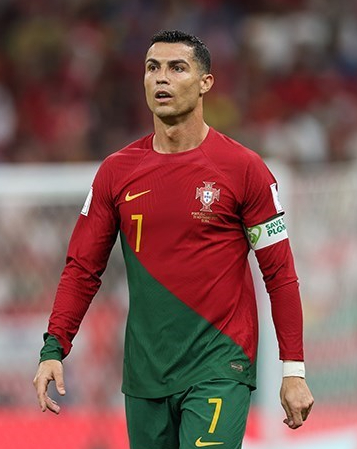
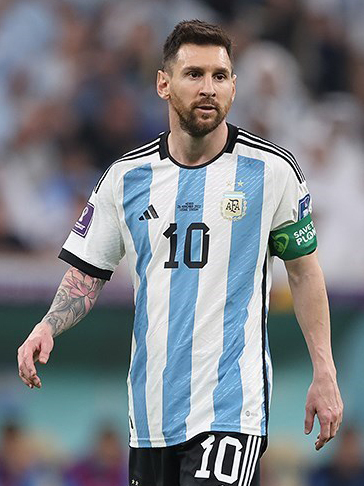
Cristiano Ronaldo (left) and Lionel Messi (right) wearing the captain's armband while playing for Portugal and Argentina, respectively.

In the 1986 FIFA World Cup, when Bryan Robson was injured and vice-captain Ray Wilkins received a two-game suspension for a red card, Peter Shilton became England's captain for the rest of the tournament.

During the 2010 FIFA World Cup in South Africa, Germany had three captains. Michael Ballack had captained the national team since 2004, including the successful qualifiers for the 2010 World Cup, but he did not play in the latter tournament due to a last minute injury. Philipp Lahm was appointed captain in South Africa, but due to an illness that ruled him out of Germany's final fixture, Bastian Schweinsteiger captained the team for that game which was the third-place match. Lahm stated in an interview that he would not relinquish the captaincy when Ballack returned, causing some controversy, so team manager Oliver Bierhoff clarified the situation, saying: "Philipp Lahm is the World Cup captain and Michael Ballack is still the captain". Lahm ended up becoming the permanent captain of Germany until his retirement, as Ballack was never called up in the national team again.

== See also ==
- Captain (sports)
