= Irene del Río =

Spanish footballer

Personal information
- Full name: Irene del Río Peláez
- Date of birth: 6 October 1991 (age 35)
- Place of birth: Oviedo, Spain
- Height: 1.61 m (5 ft 3 in)
- Position: Midfielder

Youth career
- 2003–2006: Real Oviedo

Senior career*
Years	Team	Apps	(Gls)
2006–2015	Real Oviedo	127+	(33+)
2015–2017	Barcelona	34	(8)

International career
2007–2008	Spain U17		
2010	Spain U19	3	(1)

Managerial career
- 2023–2025: Spain (assistant)
- * Club domestic league appearances and goals

Irene del Río Peláez (born 6 October 1991) is a Spanish former footballer who played club football for Real Oviedo and Barcelona, and also represented Spain at under-17 and under-19 youth international levels.

== Club career ==
Del Río played for Real Oviedo for 12 seasons, and was later the team's captain. She made her debut for Oviedo in the Superliga Femenina at the age of 15. In 2011, she won the Quini award for being the top Asturian goal scorer in the 2010–11 season, and also the Women's Draft Football Award for best under-20 player.

In June 2015, she signed for Primera División champions Barcelona. She was the second Asturian to play for Barcelona, after Montse Tomé. She played for Barcelona in the 2015–16 UEFA Women's Champions League, where they reached the quarter finals before being beaten by Paris Saint-Germain Féminine. She came on as a substitute in the first leg of the quarter final, which finished 0–0. She was in the Barcelona team that lost the 2016 Copa de la Reina de Fútbol Final to Atlético Madrid Femenino, and won the 2017 Final. Whilst she was playing for Barcelona, they finished second in the 2015–16 and 2016–17 Primera División seasons.

== International career ==
Del Río has played for Spain under-17s and Spain under-19s. She made her debut for Spain under-17s at the age of 15. In 2009, she trained with the under-19 team at La Ciudad del Fútbol. At the time, she had previously appeared in under-19 matches against France under-19s and Lithuania under-19s. In 2011, del Río was called up to the senior squad; she was the only player in the squad who did not play in the Primera División, as Real Oviedo played in the Segunda División Pro at the time. Del Río was in the extended pre-squad list for the 2015 FIFA Women's World Cup in Canada, but was not selected in the final squad for the tournament.

== Post-playing career ==
After retiring from football, del Río worked as a physical trainer for FC Barcelona Femení during the 2019–20 season.

== Personal life ==
Del Río is from Asturias, Spain. At school, she was the only girl who played football. As a youngster, del Río undertook rhythmic gymnastics.
