= Iris Arnaiz =

Spanish footballer (born 1994)

Personal information
- Full name: Iris Arnaiz Gil
- Date of birth: 18 May 1994 (age 32)
- Place of birth: Gijón, Spain
- Height: 1.68 m (5 ft 6 in)
- Position: Midfielder

Team information
- Current team: Sevilla
- Number: 16

Senior career*
Years	Team	Apps	(Gls)
2009–2010	Langreo		
2010–2017	Real Oviedo	105+	(8+)
2017–2021	Deportivo La Coruña	52+	(0)
2021–2024	Real Sociedad	38	(1)
2024-	Sevilla	0	(0)
- * Club domestic league appearances and goals as of 22:15, 7 February 2023 (UTC)

Iris Arnaiz Gil (born 18 May 1994) is a Spanish footballer who plays as a midfielder for Sevilla.

== Club career ==
Arnaiz started her career at Langreo. In May 2021, it was announced that Arnaiz was the third player in Deportivo La Coruña's history to reach the milestone of 100 domestic appearances for the club.
