= Ángela Sosa =

Spanish footballer (born 1993)

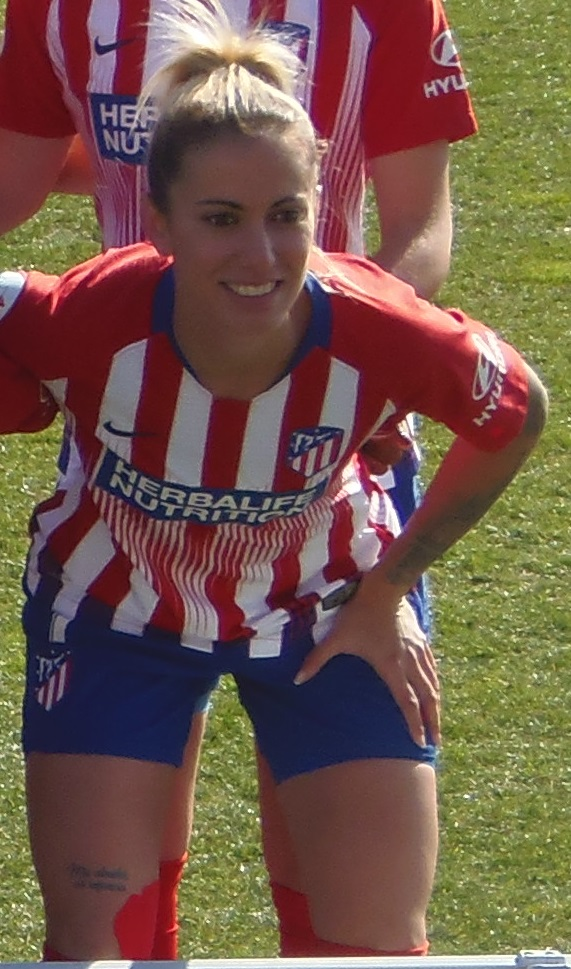
- Sosa in 2019

Personal information
- Full name: Ángela Sosa Martín
- Date of birth: 16 January 1993 (age 33)
- Place of birth: Sevilla, Spain
- Height: 1.66 m (5 ft 5 in)
- Position: Midfielder

Team information
- Current team: Madrid CFF
- Number: 20

Youth career
- 2007–2009: Sevilla

Senior career*
Years	Team	Apps	(Gls)
2009–2013	Sevilla		
2013–2014	Sporting Huelva	28	(10)
2014–2020	Atlético Madrid	140	(27)
2020–2023	Real Betis	94	(23)
2023–2025	Levante	48	(4)
2025–	Madrid CFF	25	(3)

International career^{‡}
2018–	Spain	6	(0)
- * Club domestic league appearances and goals as of 12:19, 10 October 2021 (UTC) ‡ National team caps and goals as of 25 October 2020

Ángela Sosa Martín (born 16 January 1993) is a Spanish footballer who plays as a midfielder for Liga F club Madrid CFF and the Spain women's national team.

== Career ==
In 2007, Sosa became the youngest player to debut in the Primera División at 14 years and two days old for Sevilla.

== Honours ==
Club

- Primera División: Winner 2016–17, 2017–18
- Copa de la Reina de Fútbol: Winner 2016

Individual

- Primera División best player 2017–18
