= Ane Bergara =

Spanish footballer (born 1987)

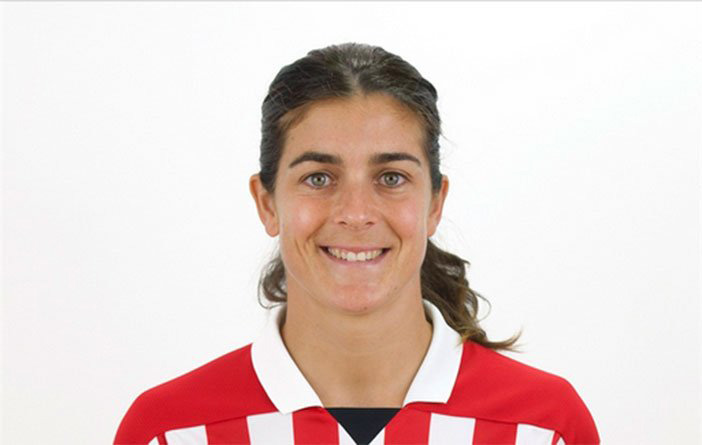
- Bergara in 2017

Personal information
- Full name: Ane Bergara Artieda
- Date of birth: 3 February 1987 (age 39)
- Place of birth: Bera, Spain
- Height: 1.71 m (5 ft 7 in)
- Position: Defender

Senior career*
Years	Team	Apps	(Gls)
2002–2005	Lagunak		
2005–2011	Espanyol	122+	(4+)
2011–2015	Real Sociedad	116	(11)
2015–2017	Barcelona	33	(3)
2017–2018	Athletic Bilbao	14	(0)
2018–2019	Mariño		

International career
2004–2006	Spain u19	13	(0)
2015	Spain	5	(0)
2006–2017	Basque Country	7	(0)
- * Club domestic league appearances and goals

Ane Bergara Artieda (born 3 February 1987) is a Spanish retired footballer who played as a defender. She was a member of the Spain women's national team.

== Career ==
Bergara played her entire career in Primera División. She spent four seasons with SD Lagunak, six with RCD Espanyol, four with Real Sociedad, two with FC Barcelona and a single-year swansong at Athletic Bilbao.

== International career ==
Bergara was a member of the Spain under-19 team that won the 2004 U-19 European Championship.

== Honours ==
=== Club ===
Espanyol

- Primera División: 2005–06
- Copa de la Reina: 2006, 2009, 2010

=== International ===
Spain U19

- UEFA Women's Under-19 Championship : 2004
