= Laura Ràfols =

Spanish footballer (born 1990)

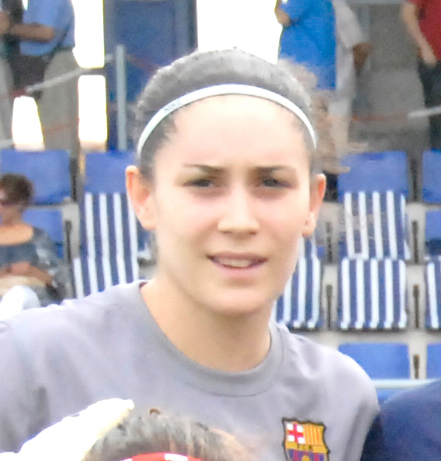

Personal information
- Full name: Laura Ràfols Parellada
- Date of birth: 23 June 1990 (age 36)
- Place of birth: Vilafranca del Penedès, Spain
- Height: 1.76 m (5 ft 9 in)
- Position: Goalkeeper

Youth career
- 1995–2004: Atlètic Vilafranca

Senior career*
Years	Team	Apps	(Gls)
2004–2007	Barcelona B		
2007–2018	Barcelona	158+	(0)

International career
2007–2008	Spain U-19	8	(0)
2014–2017	Catalonia	4	(0)
- * Club domestic league appearances and goals

Laura Ràfols Parellada (born 23 June 1990) is a Spanish former footballer who played as a goalkeeper. She served as the captain for Barcelona, and also represented the club in the UEFA Women's Champions League.

== Career ==
=== Club ===
Ràfols started playing football for Atlètic Vilafranca's boys' team at the age of five, since at the time there was no female exclusive team for her age range. After three years she joined their girls team and remained a member of the club until joining Barcelona at the age of 14. After a temporary relegation to the second division during 2007–08, Barcelona achieved many trophies with Ràfols as their number one goalkeeper including four consecutive league titles from 2012 until 2015; in each of those years she conceded the fewest goals among the league's goalkeepers.

=== International ===
Ràfols was one of the goalkeepers for the Spain under-19 team that participated in 2008 UEFA Championship. She was also captain of the Catalonia's national team.

== Education ==
She has a degree in sports physiotherapy and a master's degree in physical activity, health and training.

== Honours ==
=== Club ===
FC Barcelona

- Primera División (4): 2011–12, 2012–13, 2013–14, 2014–15
- Segunda División: 2007–08
- Copa de la Reina de Fútbol (4): 2011, 2013, 2014, 2017.
- Copa Catalunya (8): 2009, 2010, 2011, 2012, 2014, 2015, 2016, 2017
