= La Ciudad del Fútbol =

Football training facility in Las Rozas de Madrid, Spain

Ciudad del Fútbol
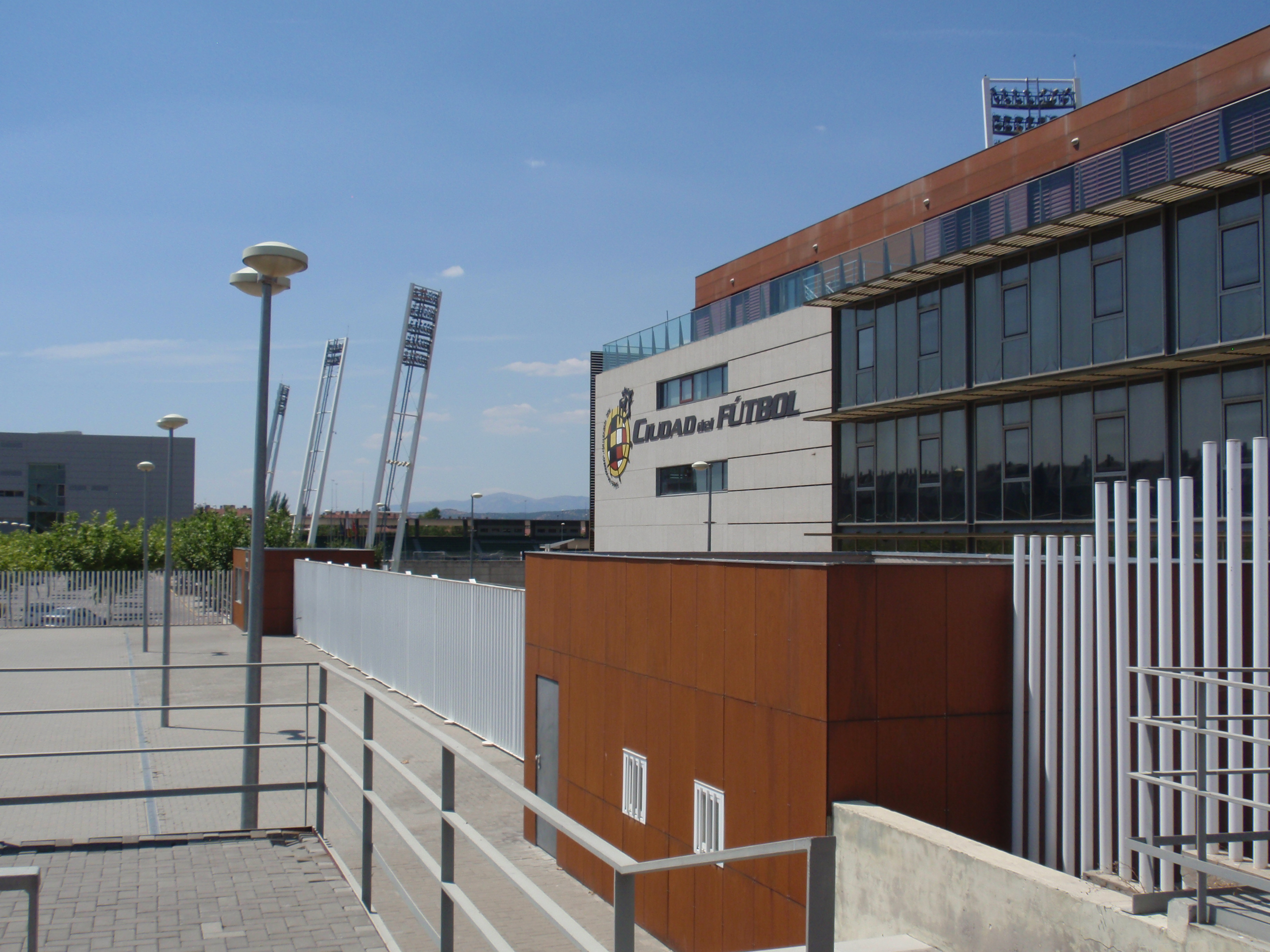
- Interactive map of Ciudad del Fútbol
- Location: Las Rozas de Madrid; Madrid, Spain
- Coordinates: 40.524°N 3.901°W
- Owner: Royal Spanish Football Federation
- Type: Football training facility

Construction
- Built: 12 May 2003
- Cost: €46 million

Tenant
- Spain national football team (training) (2003–present)

Website
- canaldeportivo.com/mundo_futbol

La Ciudad del Fútbol de la Real Federación Española de Fútbol (English: The Football City of the Royal Spanish Football Federation) is a football training facility opened in 2003, serving as the headquarters of the Royal Spanish Football Federation as well as the official training centre of the Spanish football team. It is located in the municipality of Las Rozas de Madrid around 20 km northwest of the capital Madrid, within the Community of Madrid.

== Overview ==
Occupying and area of 12 hectares, the Ciudad del Fútbol was opened on 12 May 2003. It is currently home to 4 regular-sized football training pitches, an indoor arena, a social and training area, the athletes' residential building and on-site medical centre.

The main building of the Spanish Football Federation is located at the eastern side of the complex. The museum of the Spain national football team as well as the Luis Aragonés assembly hall are housed in the building.

The centre provides a range of football and professional training courses for coaches and referees. It also hosts a number of annual football tournaments, such as UEFA Women's youth tournaments.

In January 2021, local clubs CF Fuenlabrada, Rayo Vallecano and AD Alcorcón held their Copa del Rey matches at the ground due to Storm Filomena affecting their venues.
