= Alexia Putellas =

Spanish footballer (born 1994)

- Putellas in 2026

Personal information
- Full name: Catalan: Alèxia Putellas i Segura; Spanish: Alexia Putellas Segura
- Date of birth: 4 February 1994 (age 32)
- Place of birth: Mollet del Vallès, Catalonia, Spain
- Height: 1.73 m (5 ft 8 in)
- Position: Midfielder

Team information
- Current team: London City Lionesses
- Number: 11

Youth career
- 2001–2005: Sabadell
- 2005–2006: Barcelona
- 2006–2008: Espanyol

Senior career*
Years	Team	Apps	(Gls)
2008–2010	Espanyol B		
2010–2011	Espanyol	25	(3)
2011–2012	Levante	34	(15)
2012–2026	Barcelona	350	(156)
2026–	London City Lionesses	7	(3)

International career^{‡}
2004–2007	Catalonia U12	3+	
2006–2008	Catalonia U14		
2008–2010	Catalonia U15/U16	3+	(2+)
2009–2011	Spain U17	4+	(1+)
2010–2012	Catalonia U18		
2011–2013	Spain U19	20	(13)
2013–	Spain	150	(43)
2014–2016	Catalonia	3	(1)
Medal record
Women's football
Representing Spain
FIFA Women's World Cup
Winner	2023 Australia-New Zealand
UEFA Women's Championship
Runner-up	2025 Switzerland
UEFA Women's Nations League
Winner	2024 France–Netherlands–Spain
- * Club domestic league appearances and goals as of 00:50, 28 October 2026 (UTC) ‡ National team caps and goals as of 13 October 2026

Alèxia Putellas i Segura (Note: Catalan pronunciation: [əˈlɛksiə puˈteʎə səˈɣuɾə] In isolation, Putellas is pronounced pronounced [puteʎəs].) (Note: Alèxia Putellas i Segura is her name according to the Catalan Football Federation and the councils of Barcelona and Catalonia. This and the Spanish version of her name, Alexia Putellas Segura, are included in her biography on the Sport website. Putellas spells her given name with the grave accent ("Alèxia"), including when writing in Spanish, even though this accent mark does not usually appear in Spanish.) (born 4 February 1994), often known simply as Alexia, is a Spanish professional footballer from Catalonia. She plays as a midfielder and forward for the Women's Super League club London City Lionesses and the Spain national team. She has also played for the Catalonia national team. She has won all the major club awards and most of the individual awards available to a European player, and is widely regarded as one of the greatest female footballers of all time. (Note: Including by journalists for CNN, The Guardian, ESPN, Just Women's Sports; her Barcelona teammate and predecessor as The Best, Lucy Bronze; and the Laureus Sport for Good Foundation.)

In her youth, Putellas played for CE Sabadell, Barcelona, Espanyol and Levante. In 2012 she returned to Barcelona, where she won eight league titles, eight Copas de la Reina, four Supercopas de España Femenina and four UEFA Women's Champions League trophies. During the 2020–21 season, Barcelona achieved a continental treble for the first time in their history. Putellas won the UEFA Women's Player of the Year Award, the Ballon d'Or Féminin, and The Best FIFA Women's Player in 2021, becoming the first player to win all three in the same year. In 2022 she won all three awards again, becoming the first player to win any of them in consecutive years. Barcelona achieved a continental quadruple in the 2023–24 and 2025–26 seasons, and Putellas won the Ballon d'Or for the third time in 2026. The same year, she left Barcelona and signed with London City.

While playing for Spain's youth national teams, Putellas won the UEFA Women's Under-17 Championship in 2010 and 2011, and finished third at the 2010 FIFA U-17 Women's World Cup and second at the 2012 UEFA Women's Under-19 Championship. She made her debut for Spain's senior national team at the 2013 UEFA Women's Euro, and subsequently played in the FIFA Women's World Cup in 2015, 2019 and 2023, with Spain winning in 2023. As captain, she led Spain to victory at the 2023–24 UEFA Women's Nations League.

Putellas is Barcelona's all-time top goalscorer with 232 goals, and is their second most-capped player with 508 appearances. She is also the most-capped player of the Spain national team, with 150 appearances.

== Early life and education ==
Alèxia Putellas i Segura was born on 4 February 1994, to Jaume Putellas Rota and Elisabet Segura Sabaté in Mollet del Vallès, a municipality in the province of Barcelona. She has a younger sister, Alba. Putellas has been a supporter of FC Barcelona since her early childhood, when she traveled with her father to watch matches at Camp Nou. She idolised the footballers Andrés Iniesta, Rivaldo, and Ronaldinho of Barcelona, as well as Louisa Nécib of Olympique Lyonnais.

As a child, Putellas played basketball, roller hockey and tennis in addition to football, and attended football camps run by Xavi. She also participated in Catalan folk dancing. Putellas joined a football club at the age of seven, and was made captain of her age group when she was nine. (Note: Attributed to multiple references:) However, she did not think she could have a football career due to being female. The first club team she played for was the CF Mollet UE boys' team. She did not like the atmosphere of the team, and left after three training sessions. Soon after, she joined the Sabadell girls' team.

In 2013, Putellas began studying business administration and management at the Pompeu Fabra University in Barcelona. One of her motivations for earning a degree was the lack of professionalism in women's football in Spain. She eventually took a break from her studies to focus on playing football. (Note: Attributed to multiple references:)

== Club career ==
=== Youth career ===
==== Sabadell, 2001–2005 ====
When she was seven, Putellas began playing for Sabadell, being enrolled through a family friend who played for the club; the team would not accept players younger than eight, with Putellas' family initially lying about her age so she could join. It is here she first played with future Barcelona teammates Vicky Losada and Marta Corredera. Despite being several years younger than some of her Sabadell teammates, Putellas was made one of the team captains. She was smaller and weaker than other players, and could not shoot from distance, things which frustrated her. Sports media wrote that Putellas found success at this age due to her ability to find "space where there is none" even as a child. Sabadell was the only nearby club that had a women's section but, though the women's team flourished during the period Putellas was with them and the staff of the girls' team pushed to develop, the girls' team was not a priority. It was difficult for Putellas and her family to manage her training there as a child, but by 2004 she was playing football religiously.

==== Barcelona, 2005–2006 ====
In 2005, Putellas spent a year in a Barcelona girls' youth team as part of La Masia. With the team, Putellas won the youth editions of the 2005 Copa Catalunya and the league. Joining Barcelona was her dream, but she had to leave when the women's system was restructured and there was no team for her age group; Xavi Llorens, who became manager in 2006, reflected that he always expected Putellas to return, "it was just a matter of waiting for the right time". Putellas, like many of the displaced players, joined Espanyol, the other club in Barcelona.

=== Espanyol, 2006–2011 ===
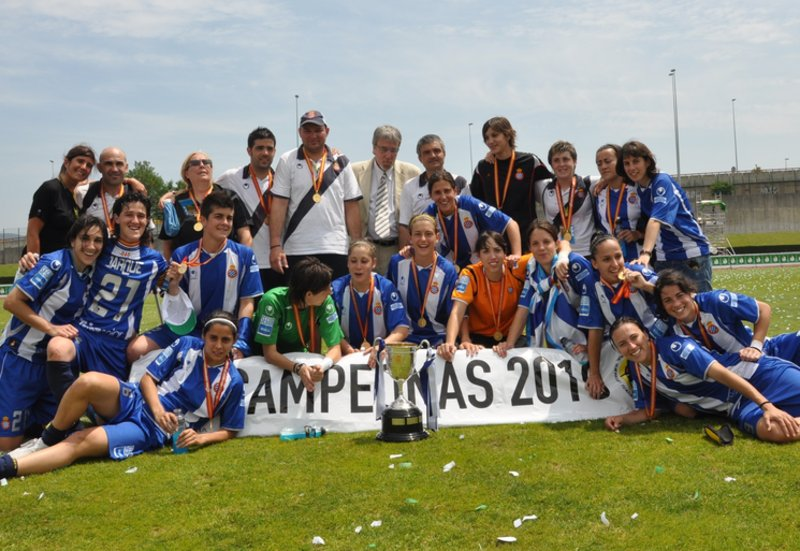
Putellas (front centre) with the Espanyol team that won the 2010 Copa de la Reina

Putellas joined the Espanyol girls' team when she was twelve, at a time when Espanyol was one of the dominant forces in Spanish women's football, "with an incredibly prolific academy", and Barcelona was not. Through the youth and senior teams she played alongside Marta Torrejón and Andrea Pereira, who would both later become her teammates at Barcelona. In 2007, the Espanyol Cadet team won the youth Copa Catalunya, also taking the league title in 2008 at the end of the season. Putellas then began appearing for the women's Espanyol B team from the age of 14 in 2008, and trained and played with the first team during pre-season in 2009. She made her first team debut with Espanyol in 2010 when she was 16 years old. She was part of the squad that won the 2010 Copa de la Reina, with Espanyol defeating Rayo Vallecano 3–1 in the final. Putellas played in the 2011 Copa de la Reina for Espanyol, starting in the final that they lost 0–1 in extra time to Barcelona. Putellas' performances with Espanyol identified her as one of Spain's best young players.

=== Levante, 2011–2012 ===
Already a star in the fledgling women's football world in Spain after her success with the youth national team, Putellas attracted attention when she moved to Valencian club Levante at the age of seventeen, only a month after the 2011 Copa de la Reina final. Levante did not compete in the 2012 Copa de la Reina due to failing to qualify in the previous season, but had numerous Spain football veterans and a professional environment, unusual at the time, which is said to have contributed to Putellas' individual growth. She had a personally successful 2011–12 campaign, scoring 15 goals in 34 matches (playing all matches in the season) and finishing as Levante's top scorer. At Levante, she was coached in how to play off the ball, developing technical and tactical skills like a midfielder, and to become capable with both feet after the coach, Antonio Contreras, felt she was too reliant on her left. He also said she was already a very classy and intelligent player when she joined.

=== Barcelona ===
==== 2012–2013 ====
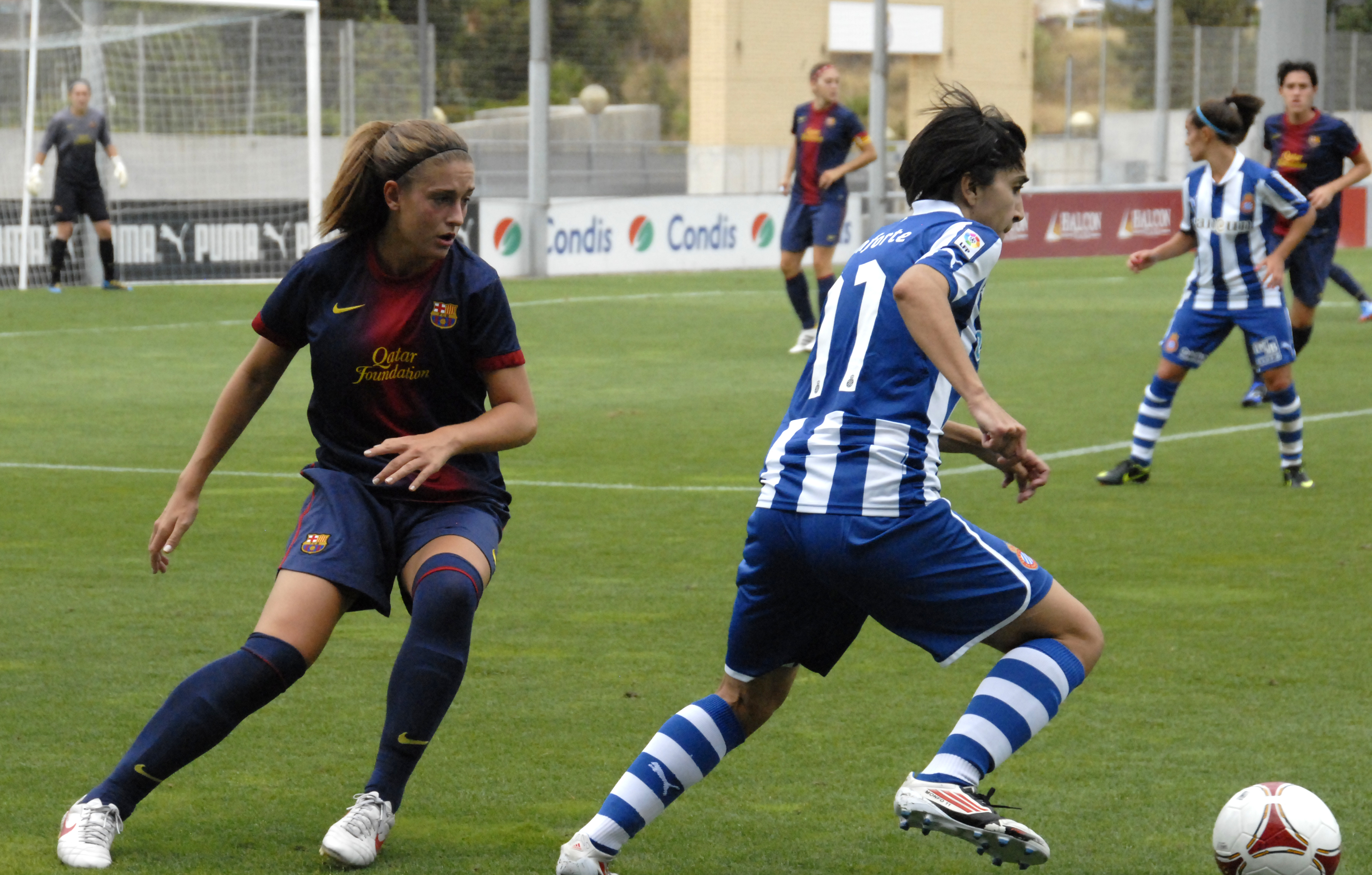
Putellas (left) with Barcelona in 2012

Llorens and Barcelona had continued to follow Putellas' career after she left, and in the summer of 2012, following her breakthrough year with Levante and the death of her father, approached her to rejoin the club. Barcelona had also risen to dominance in the prior season, and brought in Putellas as their star signing to head a long-term project aiming for Barcelona to be able to challenge for the Champions League title after "five or six" seasons. Putellas accepted the offer, signing for the club as a forward on 10 July 2012 – in her early years with Barcelona, she often played as a false winger – and started and played most of their matches that season. Because of Barcelona's first-ever league title win in the previous season, they made their debut in the 2012–13 UEFA Women's Champions League; after signing for Barcelona, Putellas said it was a dream to be able to play in the Champions League. On 26 September 2012, she started in her UEFA Women's Champions League debut against Arsenal, which they lost 0–3 at home despite starting strong. In the away leg, Barcelona lost 0–4, and exited their tournament debut in the Round of 32.

On 5 May 2013, Putellas won her first league title with Barcelona when they defeated Athletic Bilbao 2–1 at the San Mamés to a crowd of over 25,000. In 2021, Putellas said this was one of her favourite matches because it "made her feel like a footballer". In the 2013 final of the Copa de la Reina she scored Barcelona's third goal against Prainsa Zaragoza by dribbling past two Zaragoza defenders, past their keeper, and poking the ball into the net. The goal went viral and attracted more attention for Putellas from Spanish and international media. (Note: E.g. in El País, Terra, El Correo, Marca, and Cadena SER.) Barcelona won 4–0, the first domestic double in their history. Putellas was chosen as MVP of the Copa de la Reina final for her performance.

==== 2013–2014 ====
In March 2014, Barcelona became the first Spanish team to reach the quarterfinals of the Women's Champions League; Putellas, acknowledging that their tie against defending champions Wolfsburg would be hard, said that Barcelona dreamed of being able to surprise them but would be "keeping [their] feet on the ground" ahead of the games; she later said that reaching a Champions League final was "a medium-to-long-term project" for the team. They lost 0–5 on aggregate, with Wolfsburg going on to win the title. On 13 April, Barcelona became league champions after the team went unbeaten for 27 games, with Putellas winning her second consecutive league title with the club. She was recognised for her incredible technical skill, particularly going one-on-one, and for being a slower player who instead used changes of pace to "destroy her opponents."

By 2014, Putellas was "widely recognised as the future of both FC Barcelona and the Spanish national team," and an integral part of Barcelona's 2014 Copa de la Reina campaign, scoring in each round of the knockout stage: her goal in the away leg of the quarter-finals against Real Sociedad saw Barcelona through with an aggregate 1–0. She was one of Barcelona's three goals for a 3–1 aggregate victory in the semi-finals, before her goals were again crucial in the final against Athletic Bilbao: her shot from outside the box in extra time took the tie to penalties, in which she scored the game-winning fifth penalty, earning her fifth major trophy with Barcelona. She was named MVP of the Copa de la Reina for the second season in a row.

==== 2014–2015 ====
Putellas scored her first ever Champions League goal in the Round of 32 of the 2014–15 UEFA Women's Champions League against Czech side Slavia Prague; Barcelona advanced after defeating Slavia Prague 4–0 on aggregate. In the Round of 16 they lost 1–2 on aggregate to Bristol Academy. Putellas won her third league title with the club when Barcelona were crowned champions in April 2015, before scoring the opening goal in their derbi femení victory. Later in May, she was included on the Fútbol Draft of Spain's best young players for the sixth consecutive season, being listed as a midfielder (rather than an attacking winger) for the first time; she was also named the Fútbol Draft best left central midfielder.

==== 2015–2016 ====
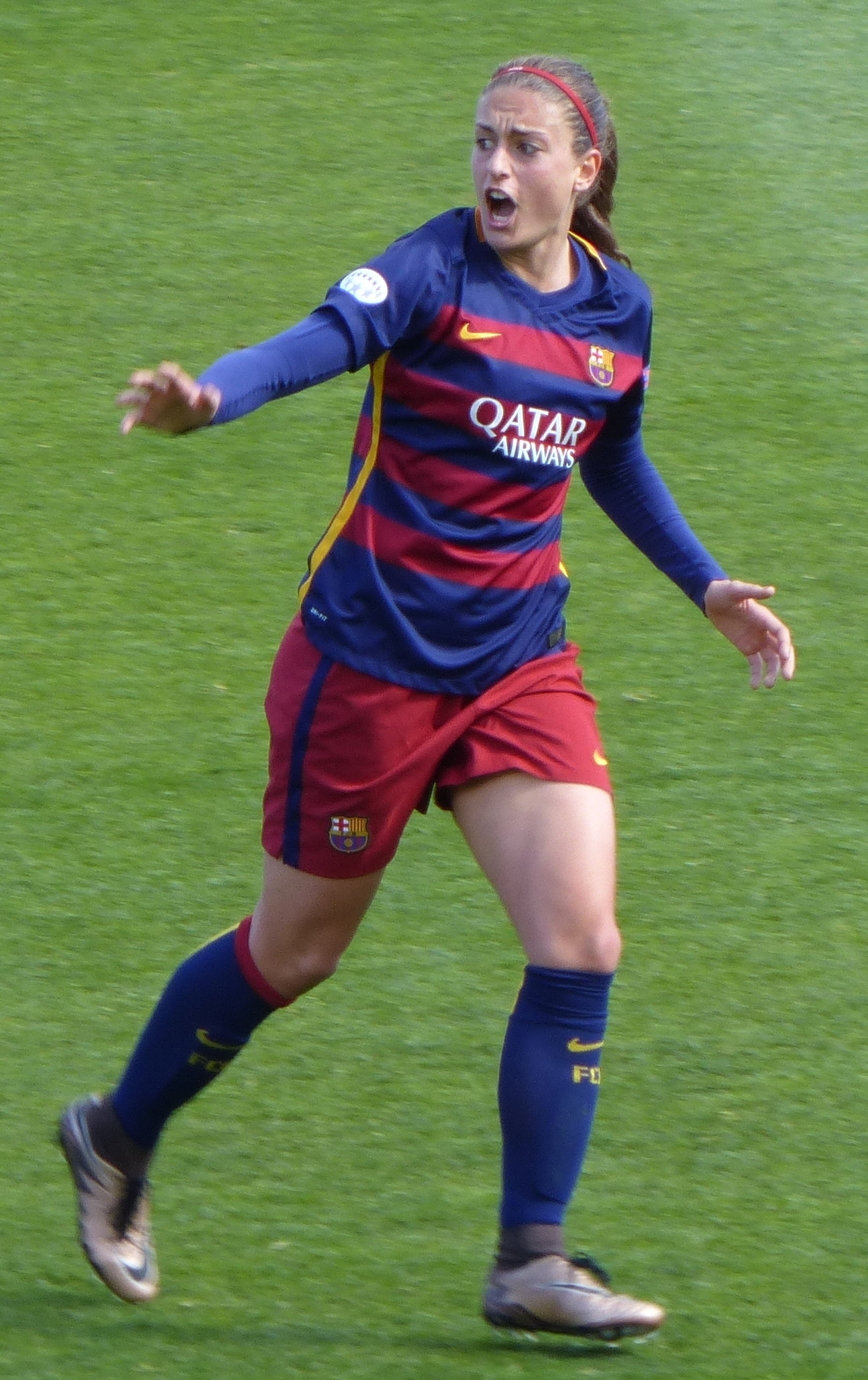
Putellas with Barcelona in February 2016

Barcelona became a fully professional team at the start of the season, with Putellas saying in early 2016 that the club had fully embraced the women's team moving to the Ciutat Esportiva, though she still felt lucky to be able to make a living from her sport.

Putellas missed Barcelona's first UEFA Women's Champions League match of the 2015–16 season against BIIK Kazygurt, returning in the second leg to provide an assist for Jennifer Hermoso in a 4–0 win. She scored the first four-goal game of her career in 2015, having never scored a hat-trick before, in a 10–0 win against Fundación Albacete in the league.

Ahead of the quarter-finals of the Champions League, which Barcelona closely lost on aggregate to Paris Saint-Germain, Putellas looked to the match as an opportunity to develop; she said that her perspective had changed, that when she first joined Barcelona she felt just playing in the Champions League was a prize to enjoy, but she wanted to be able to "reach a final in three or four years" and knew they had to be challenging teams like PSG. They held PSG to a 0–0 draw at the Mini Estadi before losing 0–1 in Paris. Acknowledging PSG's superiority between the fixtures, Putellas still said she wanted to be able to put pressure on them; fielded as Barcelona's striker in the deciding match, she was described by Sport as their joker for "doing anything the team needed" throughout the game, including playing across the attack and dropping into midfield to retain possession.

In the quarter-finals of the 2016 Copa de la Reina, Putellas scored a brace and provided an assist for Míriam Diéguez in a 5–1 win against Real Sociedad. She finished her season as Barcelona's second-highest goalscorer in the league with 18 goals.

==== 2016–2017 ====
Having missed Barcelona's first match of 2016–17 due to injury, Putellas continued her goalscoring feats in the league with a hat-trick in a 4–0 defeat of Rayo Vallecano on 2 October 2016. By January, she had scored eight goals in fourteen league games in the season, for a goal every 116 minutes. Barcelona reached the semi-finals of the UEFA Women's Champions League for the first time in the club's history and the first time by a Spanish team, Putellas as a playmaker contributing to their first goal in the 2–0 quarterfinal victory over Rosengård. She then started both legs as they were knocked out 5–1 on aggregate by PSG. A brace Putellas scored against Real Betis on 16 April helped Barcelona to the top of the league; however – and despite Barcelona winning 13–0 against Oiartzun in a match Putellas did not play – they were overtaken decisively by Atlético Madrid on the next matchday, with Atlético going on to win the league. Barcelona then defeated Atlético to win the Copa de la Reina on 18 June 2017: Putellas' third Copa de la Reina with Barcelona, she scored in the final to help them to a 4–1 victory.

In February 2017, Putellas was named as a candidate for the FIFPro Women's World XI for the first time, being listed as a forward. By this season, Putellas was one of the highest-paid Barcelona Femení players and, despite "her obvious introversion and youth", was growing as a leader and becoming a role model.

==== 2017–2018 ====
On 2 October 2017, Putellas wore the captain's band for the first time at Barcelona in a match against Santa Teresa, after all four of the club's captains were either benched or not selected in that matchday squad. Putellas was Barcelona's sole scorer in both legs of the 2018 Copa de la Reina quarter-final, scoring both match-winners against Levante to bring Barcelona to the semi-finals. After advancing past Athletic Bilbao in the semi-finals, Barcelona made it to the final where they won 1–0 over Atlético Madrid late in extra time.

==== 2018–2019 ====
In the 2018–19 season, Putellas was named as Barcelona's fourth captain, the first official captaincy role of her senior career. In the first match of that season's Champions League, Putellas conceded an own goal as Barcelona fell in a 3–1 shock defeat to BIIK Kazygurt. They came back from that loss to win 3–0 at home, and ended up advancing to the semi-finals for the second time in club history. In October, Putellas scored four goals (of Barcelona's nine) in a league game against Rayo Vallecano, as well as drawing a penalty for her team, leading AS to say she was already a reference in Spanish women's football. Putellas started both games against Bayern Munich, where Barcelona won 2–0 on aggregate. On 18 May 2019, Putellas started in Barcelona's first ever UWCL final against Olympique Lyonnais, who went on to win the match 4–1. Following Barcelona's loss in the final, Putellas was named to the UEFA Women's Champions League Squad of the Season for the first time in her career. Not soon after, she renewed her contract with the club for 3 more seasons to 2022. She ended the season as Barcelona's top scorer in the league with 16 goals and overall with 18 goals.

==== 2019–2020 ====
In 2019, Putellas was given second captaincy for the first time at Barcelona after being named as fourth captain in the previous year. For the first few months of the 2019–20 season, she captained the side during Vicky Losada's hamstring injury, but began to start as captain in most matches by default as Losada transitioned to an off-the-bench role. On 7 September 2019, she became the first player to ever score at the Estadi Johan Cruyff in a 9–1 win against Tacón, the team that would later become Real Madrid. Some days later, Putellas scored Barcelona's first goal of the 2019–20 Champions League campaign, away against Juventus. In the home leg, she scored the first ever Champions League goal at the Estadi Johan Cruyff.

In February of the following year, she started and captained both legs of the first ever Supercopa de España Femenina. In the final, she scored a brace in a 10–1 thrashing of Real Sociedad, winning her first major title with the club in two years. Later in the month, she made her 300th appearance for Barcelona against Sporting Huelva, the fourth player in Barcelona's history to reach that many appearances after Melanie Serrano, Marta Unzué, and Losada. She was honored at Estadi Johan Cruyff for the milestone in March. Following the beginning of the COVID-19 pandemic in Europe, the 2019–20 league season was suspended, with Barcelona being crowned the winner with 21 out of 32 matchdays played. It was Putellas' first league title since 2015, and her fourth with the club overall. She ended up contributing 10 goals and 8 assists in 20 league matches. At the end of the season, Putellas was named the best player of the 2019–20 league campaign.

Upon the resumption of the 2019–20 UEFA Women's Champions League, Barcelona played Atlético Madrid in the single-legged quarter-final, where they won 1–0. Barcelona advanced to the semi-final of the competition, where they were knocked out 1–0 by VfL Wolfsburg. In a post-match interview, when asked about the gap in quality between Barcelona and other elite European teams, Putellas claimed "there is no distance." On the continental stage, Putellas was named as a candidate for the UEFA Women's Team of the Year for 2020.

Although the 2019–20 UEFA Women's Champions League was completed, Barcelona were still due to complete the remaining matches of that season's Copa de la Reina campaign. Owing to the COVID-19 pandemic, the semi-finals and final of the 2019–20 Copa de la Reina were pushed back to be played during the 2020–21 season. On 13 February 2021, Putellas played the 2020 Copa de la Reina final against Logroño, and drew a penalty which she scored to put Barcelona 1–0 up. Barcelona won the final 3–0, Putellas' fifth Copa de la Reina title with the club.

==== 2020–2021 ====
As first captain Vicky Losada continued to be utilized mainly as a substitute at Barcelona, Putellas started matches as captain throughout most of the 2020–21 season. In the first match of the league season, Putellas started the first ever Women's Clásico against Real Madrid, where she scored the fourth and final goal of the match. On 6 January 2021, Putellas captained Barcelona against Espanyol, the first time women's teams ever played a competitive match at the Camp Nou. Just before halftime, Putellas scored a header goal off a corner kick from Caroline Graham Hansen, becoming the first female player to score a competitive goal at the stadium. The following week, she played against Atlético Madrid in the semi-final of the 2021 Supercopa de España Femenina, where she scored a free-kick in the 90th minute to tie the match and take it to extra time. Barcelona lost the match on penalties, one of their three losses that season in all competitions. In the second edition of the women's El Clásico, Putellas scored Barcelona's first ever home goal against Los Blancos. That goal was also her 100th goal scored in the league with Barcelona.

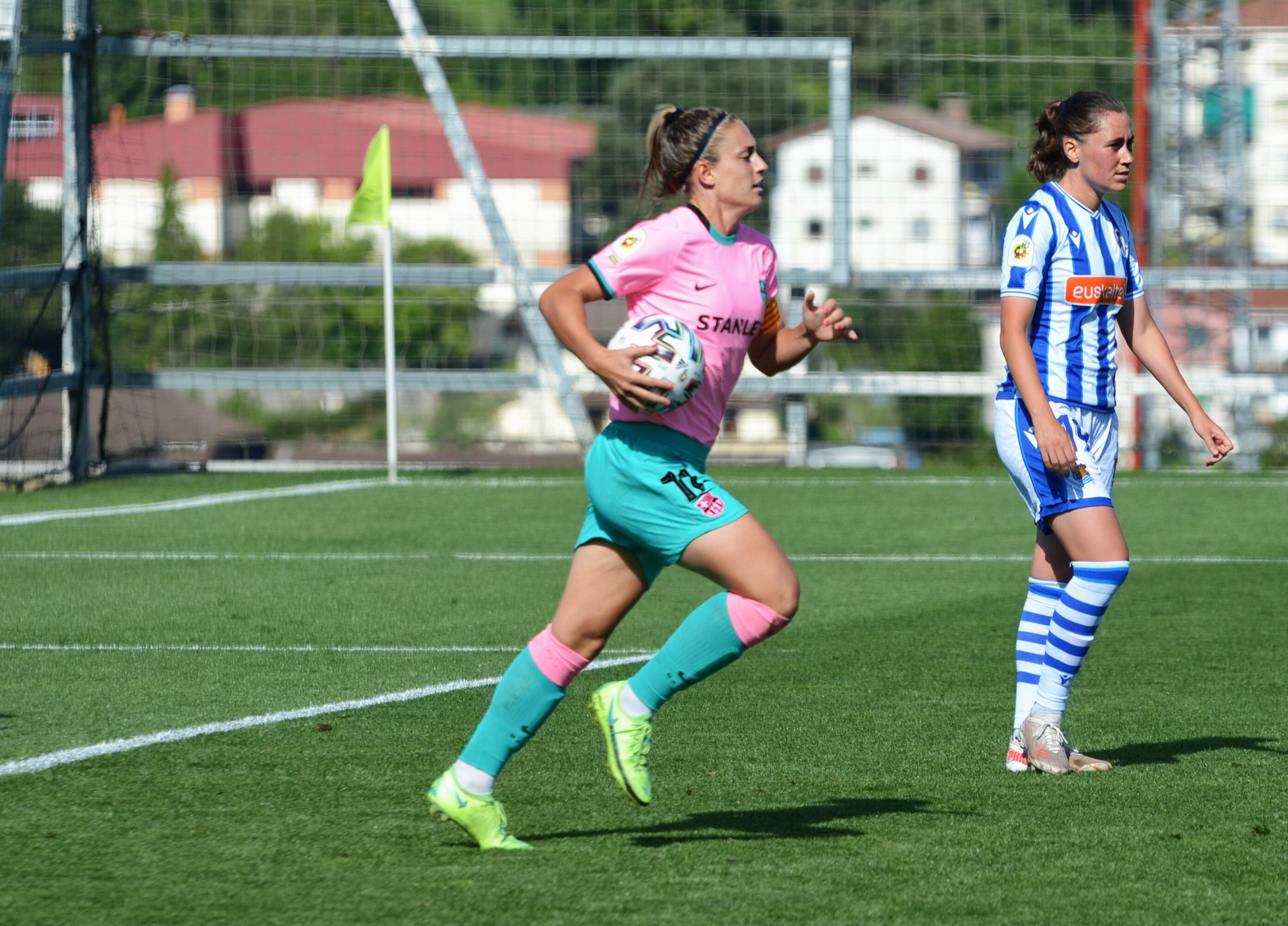
Putellas playing against Real Sociedad in 2021

In the 2020–21 Champions League, Barcelona advanced to their second ever final. A day prior to the Champions League final, Putellas trained separately from the group with her left thigh heavily bandaged due to strain on her hamstring, and was at risk of not starting the final with the status of "doubtful." Putellas said that when the pain continued in training, she focused on her mentality instead, making herself believe she was not injured so that she could play on top form. On 16 May 2021, despite her injury, Putellas started the second Champions League final of her career, this time against Chelsea. After going 1–0 up within 30 seconds, Barcelona were awarded a penalty after Melanie Leupolz made contact with Hermoso in the box. Putellas scored the penalty to put Barcelona 2–0 up within 13 minutes. In the 20th minute of the match, Putellas sent a through ball into the box towards Aitana Bonmatí, who scored Barcelona's third. The goal was later selected as the fifth-best goal of the competition. Barcelona ended the match winning 4–0, the largest margin of victory in any single-legged UWCL final, and Putellas was selected to that year's UWCL Squad of the Season. Later in the year, she was listed as a nominee to the UEFA Women's Champions League Midfielder of the Season award, which she won in August.

Later in the month of May, she competed in the final stages of the 2020–21 Copa de la Reina. Putellas was sidelined for the two league matches between the Champions League Final and the semi-final of the Copa de la Reina due to her previous injury, but started the semi-final against Madrid CFF where she scored two goals in a 4–0 win. Her two goals made her the first player in Barcelona's history to exceed 10 goals in the Copa de la Reina. In the final, played on 30 May 2021, Putellas scored two goals against Levante – a header from a Lieke Martens corner service and another coming from a shot from open play into the far right corner. The match ended with a 4–2 victory to Barcelona as they completed the continental treble, a first for a Spanish women's club team. Putellas also won MVP of the Copa de la Reina final for the third time in her career, and scored the most goals in the tournament with five. The cup was her sixth Copa de la Reina with Barcelona and her seventh overall. Putellas ended her season as the highest-scoring midfielder in Europe with 26 goals in all competitions.

==== 2021–2022 ====
Following the departure of captain Vicky Losada, Putellas overtook first-captain duties at the beginning of the 2021–22 season. In August 2021, she was nominated as a UEFA Women's Player of the Year finalist alongside Barcelona teammates Lieke Martens and Jennifer Hermoso. Putellas was given the award later in the month, becoming the first Spanish woman to win it. In September 2021, Putellas renewed her Barcelona contract for three more years until 2024. On 25 September, she scored one of the fastest-ever hat-tricks in her club's, and Spanish women's football, history after she netted three goals in four minutes in her side's 8–0 defeat of Valencia, one of which was scored from 40 yards. In the month of October, Putellas kicked off Barcelona's 2021–22 UEFA Women's Champions League campaign by scoring their second goal in a 4–1 group stage win against Arsenal. That same month, she was listed as a nominee for the 2021 Ballon d'Or Féminin, the first Ballon d'Or nomination of her career. In November, Putellas scored three goals in two Champions League group stage matches against Hoffenheim. She finished the 2021–22 UWCL group stage with 5 goals.

On 29 November 2021, Putellas was awarded the 2021 Ballon d'Or Féminin. She became the first Spanish woman to win any World Player of the Year/Ballon d'Or award, and was the first Spaniard since Luis Suárez in 1960 to win a Ballon d'Or. She dedicated the award to her father and thanked her teammates. In January of the following year, Putellas was named as the winner of FIFA's The Best Women's Player Award, the second FC Barcelona Femení player to win the award after Lieke Martens in 2017. Days later, Putellas scored a 91st-minute winner in a 1–0 match against Real Madrid in the semi-finals of the 2021–22 Supercopa Femenina. She later started and played 65 minutes of the Supercopa Femenina final, which ended 7–0 in Barcelona's favor against Atlético Madrid.

Putellas began Barcelona's 2021–22 Copa de la Reina campaign by scoring a goal in a 3–1 win against Rayo Vallecano in the Round of 16 of the tournament. In the quarter-final of the tournament, played on 16 March 2022, Putellas scored two goals in a 3–0 win against Real Sociedad to advance Barcelona to the semi-finals. Later that month, Putellas competed in Barcelona's UWCL quarter-final matches against domestic rivals Real Madrid. In the first leg, she scored two goals to help Barcelona to a narrow 3–1 away win. In the following home leg, Putellas started and scored Barcelona's 4th goal in a 5–2 win over Real Madrid at the Camp Nou. The match broke the record for attendance at a women's football match with 91,553 fans in attendance. In April 2022, Putellas started and scored two goals in a 5–1 UWCL semi-final win over VfL Wolfsburg. The match, again hosted at the Camp Nou, broke the women's football world attendance record once more with 91,648 people in attendance.

On 21 May 2022, Putellas started Barcelona's second-consecutive UEFA Women's Champions League final against Olympique Lyon. She played all 90 minutes and scored Barcelona's only goal in a 1–3 loss. At the conclusion of the tournament, she was named the 2021–22 UWCL Player of the Season, included in the 2021–22 UWCL Team of the Season, and was recognized as the 2021–22 UWCL Top Scorer, scoring 11 goals throughout the competition. She also had the most direct goal involvements of any player in the competition with a combined 13 goals and assists.

Putellas returned to domestic competition on 25 May 2022 in Barcelona's semi-final Copa de la Reina clash against Real Madrid. She assisted Lieke Martens' opening goal in a match that ended as a 4–0 win. In Barcelona's final match of the season, the Copa de la Reina final against Sporting Huelva, Putellas played the entire match of a 6–1 win and scored Barcelona's sixth and final goal. Putellas finished as the joint-top scorer of the 2021–22 Copa de la Reina, tied with Anita Marcos and Alicia Martínez with 4 goals.

By the end of the season, Putellas' teammates agreed that "Barcelona is Alexia and Alexia is Barcelona". She finished her league season with 18 goals and a league-best 15 assists as Barcelona had a perfect, wins-only season. Her 2021–22 season was also the first time in her career that she had scored over 30 goals in a single season, and the first season since 2018–19 that she was Barcelona's top scorer in all competitions. Like last season, Putellas finished as Europe's highest-scoring midfielder with 34 goals in all competitions.

==== 2022–2023 ====
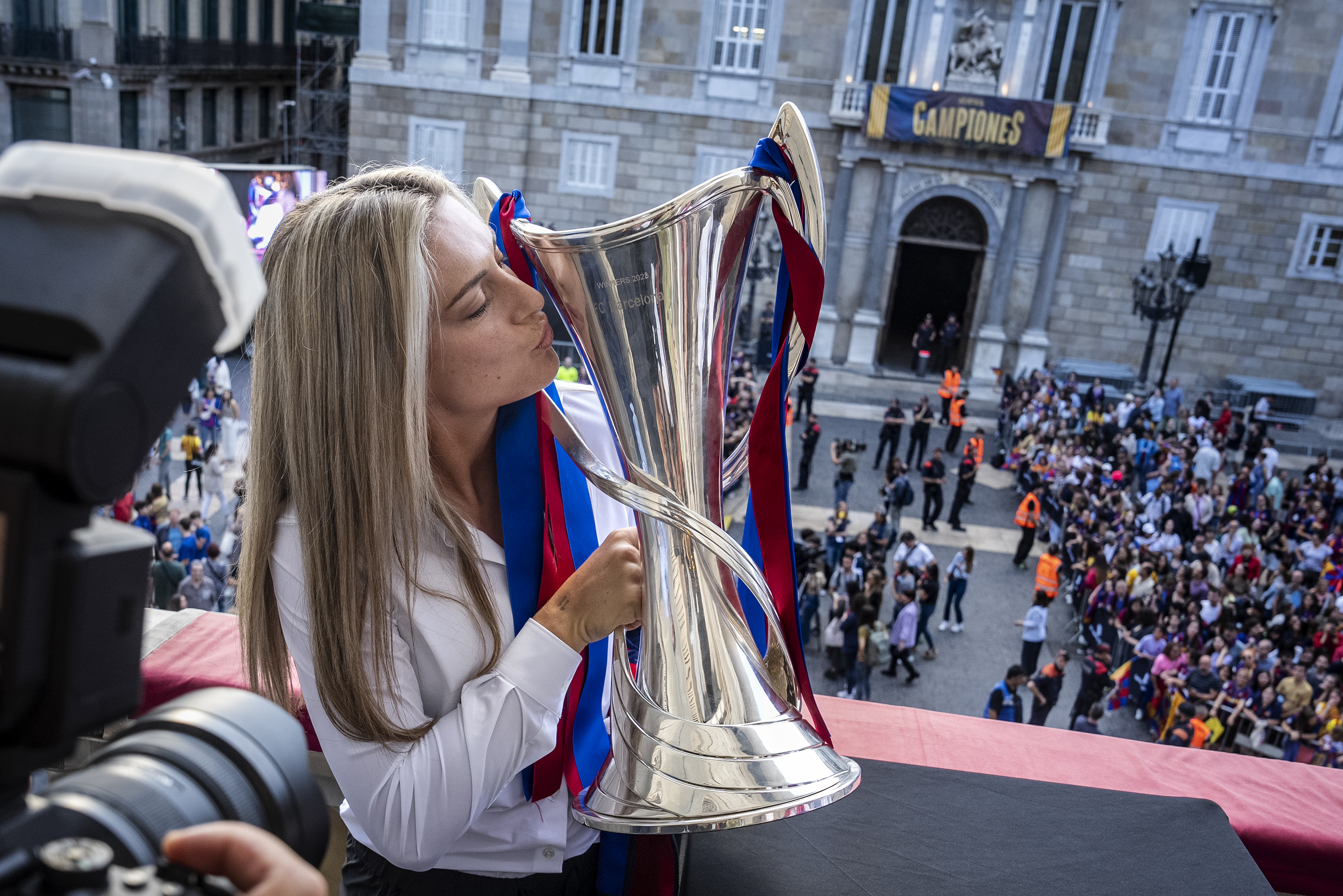
Putellas with the 2022–23 Champions League trophy at Plaça Sant Jaume

On 5 July 2022, Putellas suffered an ACL injury while training with the Spain national team before the 2022 UEFA Women's Euro. Her recovery period post-surgery was estimated to be between 10 and 12 months, meaning she would miss most (and possibly all) of the 2022–23 Primera División and 2022–23 UEFA Women's Champions League. Throughout the season, she instead picked up awards for the previous year: by the end of February 2023 she had retained all three of her UEFA Women's Player of the Year, Ballon d'Or Féminin and FIFA The Best Women's Player awards, creating a new record for consecutive wins.

At the start of February 2023, Putellas had begun more intensive training with Barcelona again, and at the end of March 2023 she was back in group training with the team. She returned to the matchday squad on 27 April 2023, for the second leg of the UEFA Women's Champions League semi-final against Chelsea, and made her first appearance on 30 April 2023, when she came on as a substitute in the 73rd minute in the league-winning victory against Sporting Huelva. She scored her first goal after returning from injury on 21 May, in Barcelona's final league game of the season; again a substitute, she scored a minute after coming on. It was the team's only goal in a 1–2 loss to Madrid CFF, their first league loss in nearly two years. In Barcelona's final match of the season, the 2023 UEFA Women's Champions League final against Wolfsburg in Eindhoven, Putellas entered the pitch in the 90th minute and played out the nine minutes of stoppage time in their 3–2 comeback victory.

==== 2023–2024 ====
Putellas moved back to the forward line ahead of Barcelona's 2023–24 season, playing as a striker or false 9, something that had been discussed between her and the coaching staff to make use of her goalscoring abilities; planning for her post-injury return during the previous season, head coach Jonatan Giráldez had thought to use Putellas in the more advanced role due to the successful midfield collaboration of Bonmatí, Patricia Guijarro and Keira Walsh. Putellas made her 400th official appearance for Barcelona during their first match of the season, the second player to achieve this milestone (following Serrano). With her goal in Barcelona's fourth match she drew level with Hermoso as the team's record goalscorer, before scoring the only goal in their next game, a victory over Atlético Madrid in October, to surpass Hermoso and become Barcelona's all-time leading goalscorer with 182 goals (in all official appearances; it was also her 131st league goal since 2013).

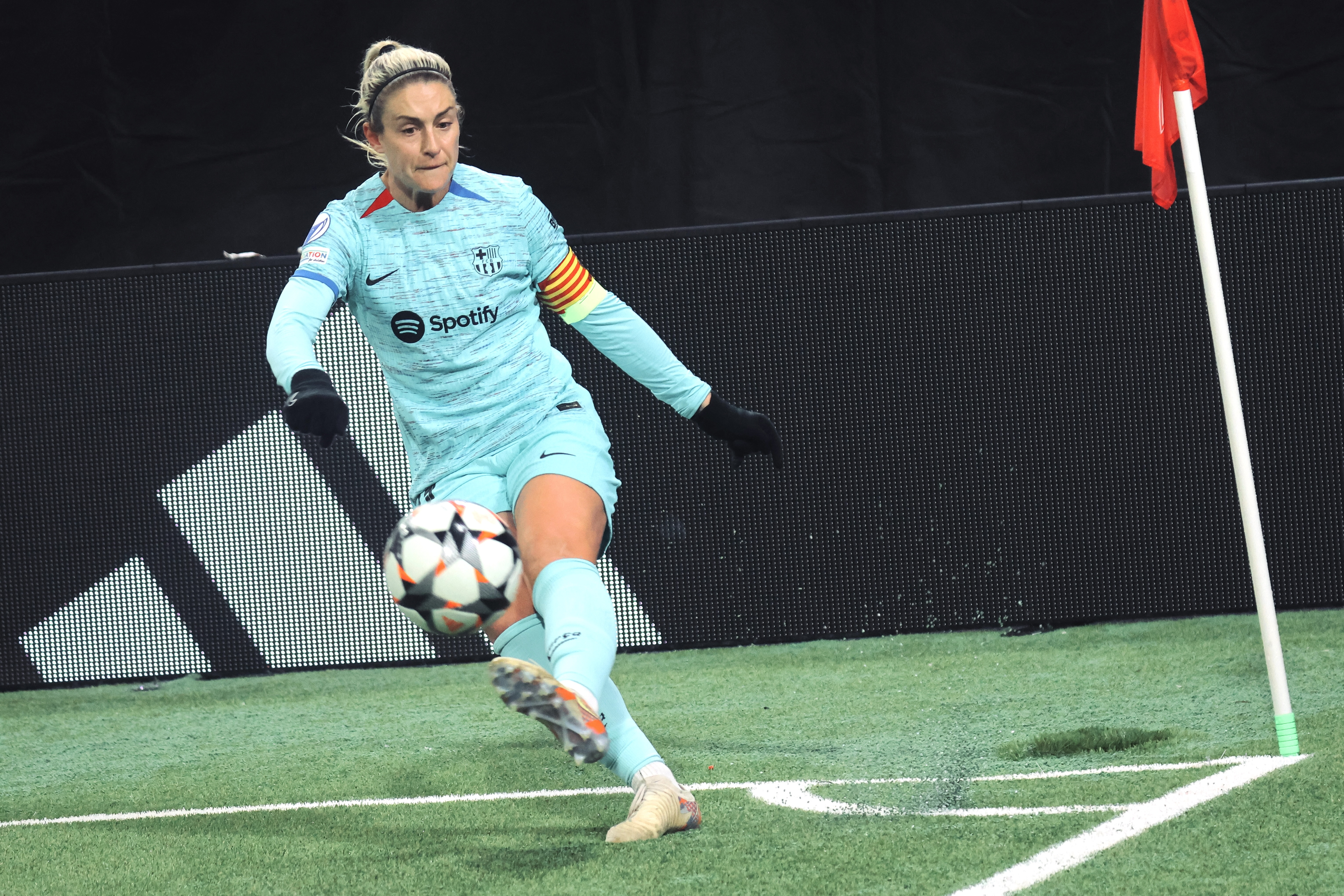
Putellas taking a corner kick for Barcelona in March 2024

She continued experiencing issues with her injury which, along with the team's new midfield, led The Equalizer to question where she fit at Barcelona in January 2024, and to describe her season as "a significant juncture in a glittering career"; El País said in March that during Putellas' mid-season absence, other forwards had become efficient goalscorers, and she may no longer fit there, either. The absence lasted four months. Having not played since November 2023, Putellas had another knee surgery in late December, followed by an intense rehabilitation plan; she was called up to play for Spain at the end of February 2024 without having been deemed match fit by Barcelona's medical staff, which reportedly soured negotiations for a new contract between Putellas and Barcelona. She returned to play for Barcelona on 10 March 2024, scoring within 15 minutes of being substituted on, also returning to her typical midfield role. With the goal, Putellas' 185th for the club, she overtook Josep Samitier to enter the top five of all-time goalscorers for Barcelona, men and women.

Barcelona suffered a surprising home loss at the hands of Chelsea in the Champions League semi-finals on 20 April; Mundo Deportivo felt that once Putellas came on she brought more fluidity and was one of the team's more impressive players in breaking down Chelsea's defense. She missed a potential equaliser in the 100th minute, before Barcelona defeated Chelsea at Stamford Bridge a week later to progress to the Champions League final. Putellas had entered the pitch in the 92nd minute (during stoppage time) of the semi-final second leg, and did so again in the final. Barcelona was leading 1–0 over European rivals Olympique Lyonnais when Putellas came on; she recovered the ball from a Lyon attack within the Barcelona box, before scoring from well-built team play in the 95th minute to make it 2–0. She took her shirt off and ran to celebrate with the fans, bowing to them – Barcelona set a new record for the largest travelling contingent in women's football – and receiving a yellow card in one of the last actions of the match. In winning the match, Barcelona secured their third Champions League title and an historic continental quadruple for the season.

==== 2024–2025 ====
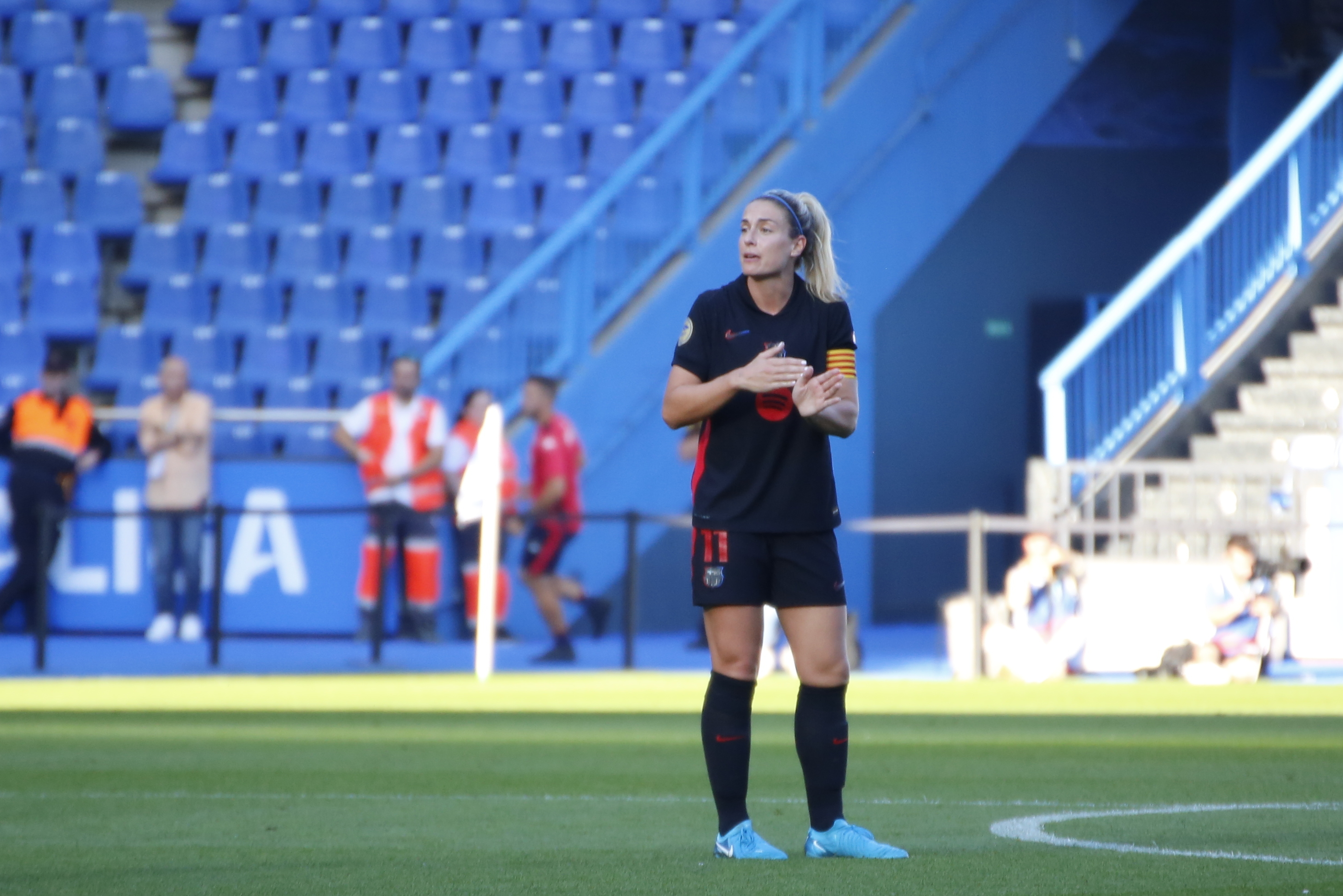
Putellas with Barcelona in September 2024

At the start of the 2024–25 season, the team again experimented with Putellas' position in order to play all four midfielders; new head coach Pere Romeu had been a pivot in his own career and particularly wanted to play both Guijarro and Walsh, moving Putellas into a false winger role within the midfield in early games. After the four-player formation proved unsuccessful in their first 2024–25 UEFA Women's Champions League match, Putellas returned to playing inside in the midfield most of the time.

Following a good start to the season in goals and assists, Putellas was named 2024–25 Liga F player of the month for October 2024. In their match against Madrid CFF at the start of the month, Putellas scored her first goal from open play in the season to take her Barcelona career tally to 194 goals, equal with László Kubala as the fourth all-time top goalscorer for FC Barcelona. Come the end of November 2024, Putellas had reached 200 goals for Barcelona and overtaken Kubala and Luis Suárez on the all-time ranking list to stand as FC Barcelona's third-highest goalscorer.

==== 2025–26 ====
Putellas made her 500th appearance for Barcelona on 2 April 2026, scoring once and providing two assists in a 6–0 win over Real Madrid in the Champions League quarter-final, leaving only Melanie Serrano ahead of her on the club's all-time appearance list. A month later, on 3 May, she netted a brace in a 4–2 victory over Bayern Munich in the Champions League semi-final, securing her club's place in the final and equaling César Rodríguez as Barcelona's second all-time top scorer with 232 goals, behind only Lionel Messi. Later that month, on 23 May, she captained Barcelona to their fourth Champions League title – and fourth title of the season – in the final against Lyon, which ended in a 4–0 victory. A day later, she was named the competition's Player of the Season. On 26 May, she announced that she would leave the club upon the expiry of her contract at the end of the season. She made her final appearance for the club on 27 May, providing an assist in a 2–1 victory over Real Sociedad.

=== London City Lionesses ===
On 8 July 2026, it was announced that Putellas had signed a three-year contract with Women's Super League club London City Lionesses. On 2 September, she was named captain of the club. On 4 September 2026, she made her first winning appearance in the WSL as captain in the opening match of the season against Manchester United. The two-time Ballon d'Or winner was described as ‘the glue in midfield while others stole the limelight’. On 26 September, Putellas scored her first goal in English football with a 2–0 at home win against Brighton & Hove Albion.

== International career ==
=== Catalonia ===
Putellas was involved in the autonomous Catalan youth teams from the age of ten. She played with the age group teams from under-12 to under-18, and with Catalonia was champion of Spain in the youth competitions. With the under-12 seven-a-side team, she took part in the Spanish Championship contested by teams from the autonomous communities in December 2007. In 2007 and 2008, Putellas was part of the Catalonia under-14 teams that won their Spanish Championship. In the second phase of the Championship for the under-15 team in 2009, Putellas scored Catalonia's only goal in their first game against Euskadi, and Catalonia's second goal in the second game; this team became the under-16 squad for their next matches, with Putellas part of the squad who took second place in 2009. She was also part of the team that won the under-16 Spanish Championship in 2010. Putellas again scored for the under-16 team in 2010, giving Catalonia the equaliser in their second phase match against the Balearic Islands.

In 2016, Putellas played with the Catalan senior national team in a friendly against Galicia. She said that whenever possible she would play for Catalonia, as she had good memories winning with the youth teams. The Catalan team often use the same international window as the Spain team, with Putellas unable to join Catalonia to play Chile in 2019 due to being called up for Spain.

=== Spain ===
==== 2009–2013: Youth success ====
Putellas began playing for Spanish youth national teams at fifteen, in the under-17 team. She took part in the 2010 UEFA U-17 Women's Championship, her first major international championship with a Spanish national team. In the group stage, Putellas scored against Denmark; Spain finished on top of the group, with three wins from three matches, and went on to sweep all their remaining matches, winning the final against Ireland on penalties.

The win at the 2010 UEFA U-17 Women's Championship gave Spain qualification for the FIFA U-17 Women's World Cup, played in the same year. Putellas scored in Spain's first match of the competition, as they won 4–1 against Japan. Again finishing first in the group stages, Spain went on to face Brazil in the quarter-finals, where Putellas assisted both of Spain's goals in a 2–1 win. When Spain reached the semi-final against South Korea, Putellas assisted Amanda Sampedro's match-opening goal, but Spain eventually lost 2–1. They then won against North Korea in the third-place playoff match.

Spain went on to replicate their under-17 Euro success in 2011. In the first match of the final round, Putellas scored twice against Iceland in a 4–0 win, sending Spain to the final. Spain, who had been favourites, won 1–0 against France in the final, Putellas' second UEFA Women's Under-17 Championship win.

The following year, Putellas moved into Spain's under-19 team. She competed in the 2012 UEFA Women's Under-19 Championship, playing as an attacker and captaining the Spanish team: she said that rather than find captaining to weigh on her, she instead felt that it gave her a boost in tough moments. Though the tournament took place less than a month after Putellas' father died, she has said she had no hesitation deciding to go, adding that football was both her escape and her connection to him. She scored in Spain's second match of the group stage in a 4–0 win against England. After finishing top of their group, Spain played in the semi-final against Portugal, where Putellas assisted Raquel Pinel's match-winning goal. Spain advanced to the final, where Putellas started and captained the match but was taken off in the 83rd minute as Spain were defeated by Sweden in the second period of extra time.

The 2012 UEFA Women's U-19 Championship was Putellas' last tournament for Spain's youth national teams. In the second round of qualifying for the 2013 UEFA Women's Under-19 Championship, Spain were placed in group 6 with Germany, the Czech Republic and Greece. Despite the high-ranking opposition, Putellas had gone into the group confident, comparing her side's gameplay to that of the Spain men's senior team and saying they would "defend the shirt to the death". She captained Spain in the group and scored twice in their three matches, but they finished third with one win and two losses, and failed to qualify. With Putellas and nearly two-thirds of the under-19 team aging out of the bracket in 2013 and 2014, and the group failing to qualify to contest any major tournament for those years, Marca said it was the end of an era for what had been a dominant period for La Rojita, Spain's youth women's teams.

==== 2013–2019: Senior debut and tournament disappointments ====
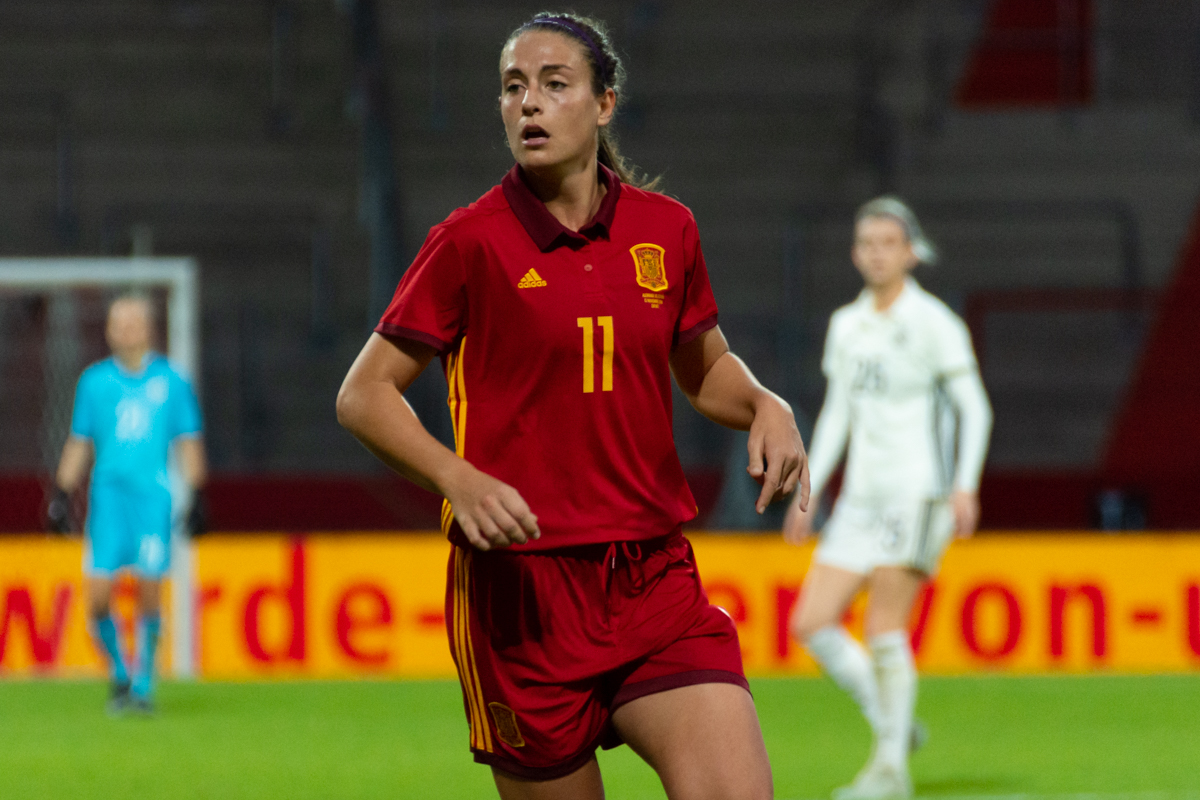
Putellas with Spain in 2018

Putellas earned her first cap for the Spain senior national team in a 2–2 pre-tournament friendly draw with Denmark in Vejle in June 2013. The following day, national team coach Ignacio Quereda confirmed her as a member of his 23-player squad for the 2013 European Championship finals in Sweden. She and friend Virginia Torrecilla were called up as part of Quereda's plan to add the "freshness" of youth players in with senior figures. Reflecting on the differences between men's and women's football in Spain shortly after being called up, Putellas said that stereotypes in society prevented the Spain women's team from seeing the same success as the men's, despite having the same technical quality. In Spain's first match of the 2013 Euro, Putellas made her competitive match debut when she was subbed on against England. She scored the winner at the end of added time in Spain's 3–2 victory with a header, (Note: UEFA and FIFA credit the goal to Putellas; it is otherwise attributed as an own goal by England goalkeeper Karen Bardsley. Sources describing video review of the goal say Putellas appeared to fail to connect with Adriana Martín's left wing cross, and Bardsley's head sent the ball into the goal.) her first senior international goal. The win was Spain's first win at a Euro tournament in 16 years, their first win against England in 17 years, as well as their only win of that tournament. Putellas played in all of Spain's matches in the tournament: as a substitute again in the team's next match against France, before starting in the group match against Russia and as Spain were eliminated by Norway in the quarter-final.

In May 2015, Putellas was called up as part of Spain's squad at the 2015 FIFA Women's World Cup in Canada, their first ever participation in a World Cup. Already a reference in Spanish women's football at the age of 20, she started every game in the tournament, where Spain put up an uninspiring display of two losses and a draw. Her and her 22 teammates in the squad called for the resignation of long-tenured coach Ignacio Quereda, citing poor preparation for the tournament and lost confidence.

Under Putellas' former coach with Spain's U-17s, Jorge Vilda, she was called up to Spain's 2017 UEFA Women's Euro squad. She started in each of Spain's group stage games at the UEFA Women's Euro 2017, where they advanced to the knockouts on a head-to-head tiebreaker with a record of one win and two losses. Spain was defeated by Austria on penalties, where she was subbed in at the 68th minute.

In May 2019, Putellas was named part of Spain's squad at the 2019 FIFA Women's World Cup, both her and Spain's second Women's World Cup tournament. She played in each of Spain's three group stage games where they advanced to the Round of 16. Spain put up an impressive display against the United States, the eventual tournament winners. Putellas started that match, which ended up a 1–2 loss to the United States.

==== 2020–2023: Leadership, injury and World Cup victory ====
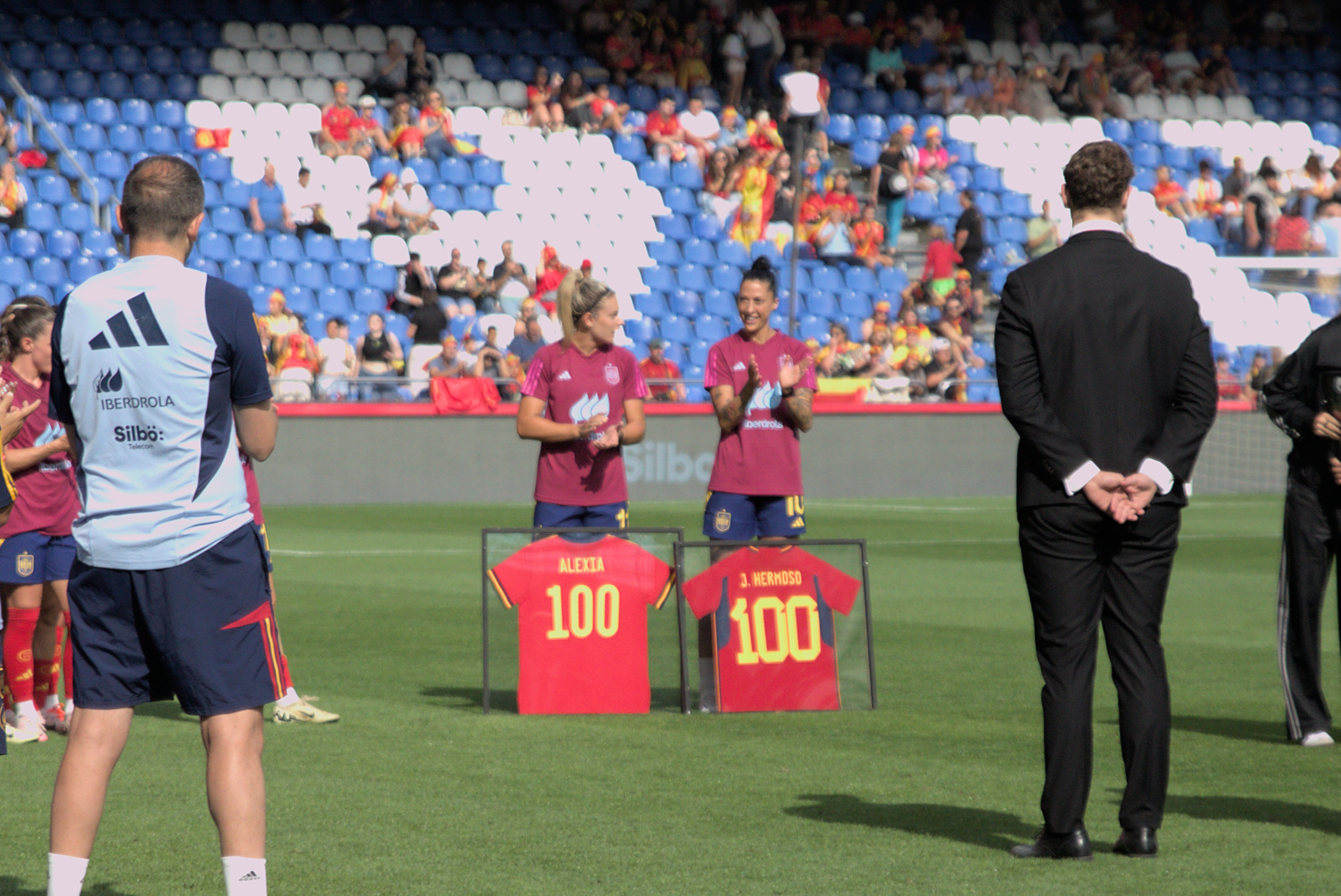
In 2022, Putellas achieved her 100th cap for Spain; she (centre left) was honoured for this in 2024.

Nine months after the World Cup, Spain competed in the 2020 SheBelieves Cup, against Japan, England, and the United States. Putellas scored once against Japan and scored a late match-winner with a header against England. Her performances earned her player of the tournament and took Spain to second place. After her friend Virginia Torrecilla was diagnosed with cancer in 2020, Putellas began wearing Torrecillas's number 14 with the national team.

Putellas, Irene Paredes and Jenni Hermoso were named captains of the national team in April 2021. In October, Putellas surpassed Torrejón's record for Spain national team appearances, picking up her 91st cap in a 2023 FIFA Women's World Cup qualifying match against Ukraine. On 2 November 2021, she was named the Spain women's national team Player of the Year.

On 1 July 2022, she became the first player to reach 100 caps with the national team, achieving this in a friendly match against Italy. Days later she was included in Jorge Vilda's final list to represent Spain at the 2022 UEFA Women's Euro but, on 5 July, the day before the Euro began, suffered an ACL tear in her left knee, leading her to miss the tournament. She attended Spain's debut match at the Euro, a 4–1 victory against Finland, as a spectator in the stands before returning to Barcelona and having a knee operation on 12 July 2022.

In September 2022, Putellas gave her public support to fifteen of her Spain teammates, known as Las 15, who refused to play for the national team until the RFEF addressed their concerns about their poor mental and physical health in the squad. On 23 September, she and the fifteen players posted a joint statement that criticised the RFEF for their response to the situation. As the RFEF refused to acknowledge the protest, Putellas acted as a mediator between players and the federation; aiming to see the conflict resolved before the 2023 FIFA Women's World Cup, some improvements in condition were achieved.

After recovering from her ACL injury, Putellas was recalled to the squad in June 2023. She scored on her return to the national team after almost a year, in a 7–0 friendly win against Panama on 29 June; the next day she was called up to the squad for the 2023 World Cup. Having not started or played a full match in over a year, Putellas was not as involved in the World Cup campaign as Spain may have hoped, still not entirely match fit. She provided an assist in the group stage game against Zambia, but more in-form players instead led the squad during the tournament. Despite her lack of minutes ahead of the later stages, sports media felt that Spain would not be able to go the distance without Putellas' influence. In the World Cup final against England, Putellas came off the bench in the 90th minute to replace Mariona Caldentey. The match ended in a 1–0 victory for Spain to achieve their first ever major trophy.

==== SeAcabó ====
Putellas speaking about respect for women in September 2023 (Note: Speech in Catalan, subtitles in English, sign in Spanish Sign Language.)

Turmoil in the squad returned immediately following the World Cup victory, due to the Rubiales affair, including the #SeAcabó movement started by Putellas; most eligible players refused to play for the team but were called up anyway for the 2023–24 UEFA Women's Nations League in September 2023. Under legal threat if they did not attend, causing public outcry, Putellas was part of a meeting in Oliva that saw the RFEF agree to make significant structural changes promptly. Having been named Spain captain ahead of the 2022 Euro but unable to take the role due to her ACL injury, Putellas had been blacklisted from captaining Spain at the 2023 World Cup by Vilda due to her support for Las 15; following the start of restructuring in the RFEF, including removal of Vilda, the team voted for Putellas to be captain again. With her position as the team's unifier, leader, and spokesperson, it was reported that some people in power at the RFEF were unhappy with the influence Putellas holds over football in Spain and that they want to try to remove her.

==== 2023–present: Nations League victories, Euro final ====
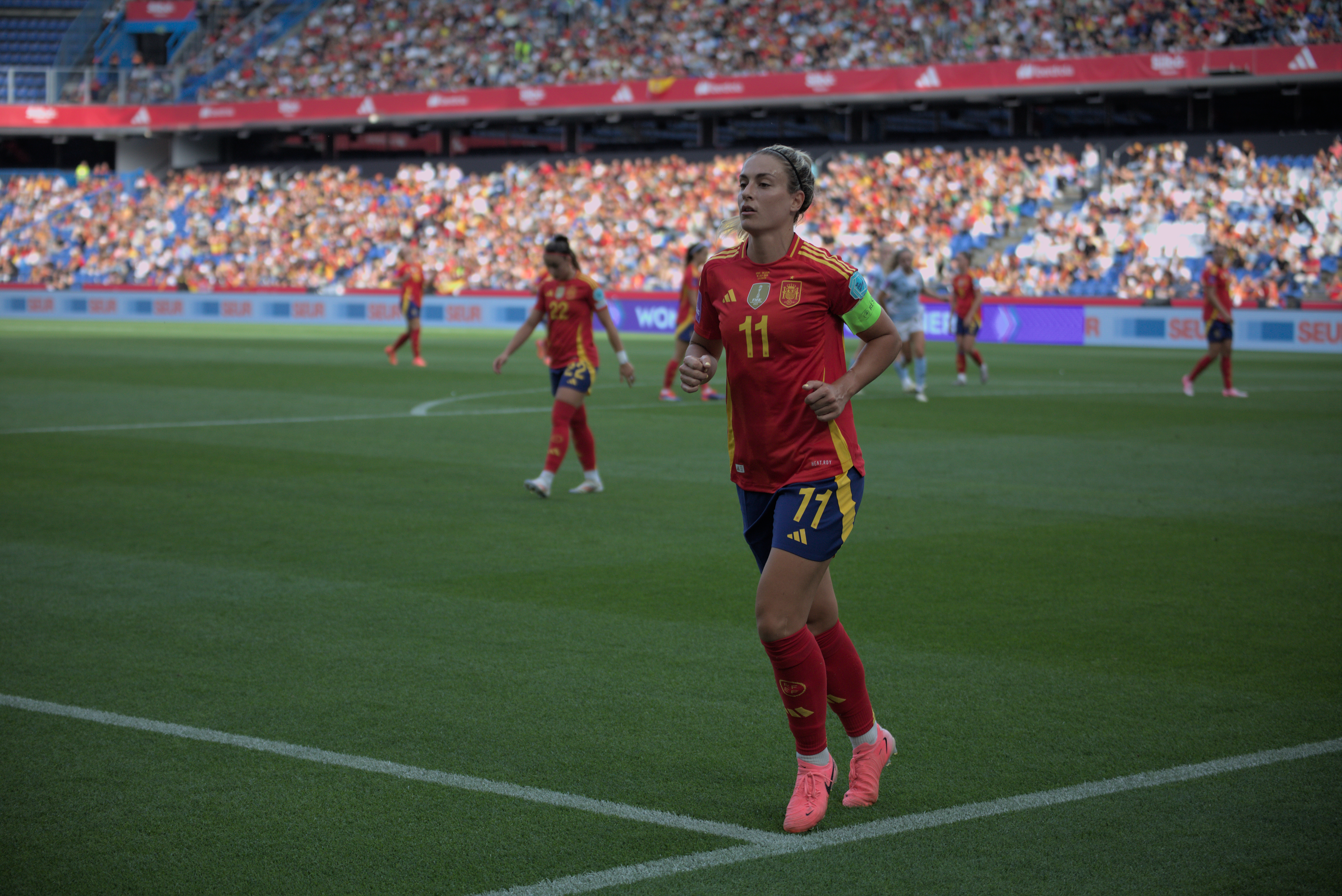
Putellas with Spain in 2024

While Putellas was an impactful player during the Nations League in September and October 2023, another injury absence saw her miss some group matches later that year, and hand the captaincy to Irene Paredes, before returning in February 2024 for the 2024 UEFA Women's Nations League Finals. Coach Montse Tomé considered Putellas as Spain's captain and too important to miss the games, though Paredes retained the captaincy and Putellas did not play in either of their matches as a promise to FC Barcelona. With Putellas said to be a great leader in the locker room, Spain won the final and thus qualification for the 2024 Summer Olympics women's football tournament. At the 2024 Summer Olympics, Putellas scored two goals in group stage wins over Nigeria and Brazil, as Spain finished in fourth place, after losing the bronze medal match to Germany.

On 10 June 2025, Putellas was called up to the Spain squad for UEFA Women's Euro 2025. She scored three goals during the tournament in group stage wins over Portugal and Belgium. Putellas started in the final against England, but ended up with a runners-up medal, as Spain were beaten on penalties. In the 2025 UEFA Women's Nations League Finals, Putellas scored three goals over both legs of the semi-final against Sweden, as Spain went on to retain the Nations League.

== Style of play ==
If you deny her space in one area, Putellas will find it elsewhere. Stopping the Barcelona Femení icon is certainly not impossible, but if Putellas is on form, the best way to stifle her is by saying a prayer.

— Adam Scully, Total Football Analysis, July 2022

Having been a left-sided forward winger with playmaking ability in her youth career, the predominantly left-footed Putellas is best known as a left-sided 'number 8' central or attacking midfielder for both Barcelona and Spain. For Spain, she has also been played as a lone 'number 10'. She has been described as the perfect "Barcelona midfielder", with the vision, passing ability, and passing accuracy that resembles her male counterparts of Barcelona's successful Guardiola era; her technique has been compared to that of male Barcelona footballers Xavi, Sergio Busquets, and particularly Andrés Iniesta, all of whom she has said inspire her game, as well as Real Madrid's Luka Modrić. GOAL has described her as "technically superb", creative, and decisive. Alongside her technical ability, she is hailed for her leadership capabilities and overall fitness.

Normally situated in the central midfield of the set-up, Putellas is one of the main contributors to Barcelona's attack, with the ability to play as an attacking midfielder and a second striker. Putellas regularly finishes each season as one of Barcelona's top contributors in terms of both goals and assists. In the 2018–19 season she was the club's highest scorer in all competitions, and in the 2020–21 and 2021–22 seasons, she was Europe's highest-scoring midfielder. Her statistics around attacking play reflect those of a centre forward, and she is most typically positioned in the opposition half as the furthest-forward midfielder, occupying a "half-space" between the opposition's back lines, and between their full-back and centre-back; her ability to receive with either foot helps her to keep the ball in this tight space, opening up attacking routes forward. In attack, she is often the player to receive the ball from deep as the final stage of build-up play, quickly pressing or passing forward. When the attack is less advanced, Putellas is able to move further back and become a passing option for her backlines when they are looking for options to break through and attack; when positioned further back, she does not act as a deep-lying playmaker, with her creative play instead occurring in the final third.

With the ball played down the left, Putellas often provides assists, using her skills on the ball to create goal-scoring opportunities in the final third. Her creative play is described by Give Me Sport as regularly "terrorising players with her fancy flicks and deft body feints". The website also noted her exceptional passing ability; though typically playing shorter passes, and more unsuccessful than not at playing through balls, Putellas otherwise has good statistics for pass accuracy and pass importance, and is often successful at passing into the penalty area. Not known for her speed, her ball management skills still allow her to dribble and keep possession, successfully dribbling an above-average amount.

When the ball is played down the right, Putellas will position herself in the box, often at the back post, taking advantage of her relative height as an option to score. As a midfielder, she sometimes takes shots from outside the area, though these are less accurate than her shots inside the box, of which she takes many; her ability to find space in the box poses a significant attacking threat. When making forward runs instead of creating the attack, Putellas will come from behind her team's forward line and so is harder for the opposition defence to detect, allowing her to identify precise routes through and time her runs to receive a ball. In this play, she is also difficult to conventionally mark due to roaming.

When needed, she can find herself in defensive midfield and left-back positions to help Barcelona open up spaces and retain possession. Spain presses high, with Putellas able to contribute to defensive play high up the pitch. In both teams, Putellas' defensive play is typically blocking the opposition's deepest midfielder, winning over 60% of defensive duels, though she has a frequent tendency to foul players she tries to recover balls from. She makes a significant number of loose ball recoveries in the opposition half and has a good work rate when counter-pressing.

== Off the pitch ==
=== Sponsorships and endorsements ===
Putellas is sponsored by Nike. In 2019, she scored the longest-range goal at the Camp Nou (100m) in a promotional event for Nike's new PhantomVNM Boots. Having first been in a Nike advertising campaign in 2015, Putellas was the face of their promotions for FC Barcelona after reaching the 2019 UEFA Women's Champions League final. For her 2021 Ballon d'Or win, Nike gifted her a custom gold crown and a pair of custom-made gold Phantom GT 2 boots. They gave her another custom pair of the same boots after her 2022 Ballon d'Or win, branded as Phantom GT II; the "ll" digraph in her surname was stylised as "II" on the box to indicate her second win, with the heel also featuring "Alexia II". Collaborating with Nike in 2024, Putellas designed the "Barna" football boots, another Phantom variant with a colourway inspired by the city. Putellas has additional sponsorships with Cupra, Allianz and Visa, and is a member of Team VISA. She is also an ambassador of fashion brand Mango, with the partnership focusing on promoting equality. Putellas has appeared in a long-form holiday advertisement for Campofrío, and various advertising campaigns around football tournaments for Lay's.

=== Recognitions and namesakes ===
Putellas has been dubbed "La Reina" (The Queen) by fans, the media, and by Nike, who included the nickname in a congratulatory post for her 2021 Ballon d'Or win. In a 2022 docu-series about Putellas, Alexia: Labor Omnia Vincit, teammate Mapi León said that Putellas had earned such a sobriquet for her contributions to football both on and off the pitch. She had first been given the nickname in a tongue-in-cheek fashion at the 2021 Copa de la Reina final; neither the RFEF president, Luis Rubiales, nor sponsor Queen Letizia attended the match as planned, considered a snub towards expected winners Barcelona. When Barcelona won and Putellas was named player of the tournament, her teammates crowned her in the press conference afterwards and parodied treating her as the queen. Putellas was awarded the 2021 Premio Reina Letizia, Spain's National Sports Award for the best overall sportswoman, which was given to her in person by Queen Letizia in 2023.

After Lionel Messi and Johan Cruyff, Putellas was the third footballer to be awarded the Creu de Sant Jordi, one of the highest civilian orders in Catalonia. She also received the Gold Medal for Sporting Merit, one of the highest civilian orders in Barcelona. For International Women's Day 2023, the viewpoint (mirador) overlooking historic Romanesque monuments in Sant Joan les Fonts was named for Putellas. A children's book, Quin nom li posarem?, was published about the process, focusing on the importance of recognising important women.

Also named after Putellas is the gymnasium at her childhood school in Mollet, with the municipality having honoured her with the International Sports Award in both 2010 and 2011. In 2021, after she won the Ballon d'Or, Mollet announced plans to award Putellas the civic title (akin to Freedom of the City) "Per Mollet". The municipality also proposed renaming their football pitch after her; she turned this down, saying that she wanted the pitch to continue honouring the Gonzalvo brothers (Juli, Josep, and Marià, after whom it was originally named), fellow FC Barcelona footballers from Mollet.

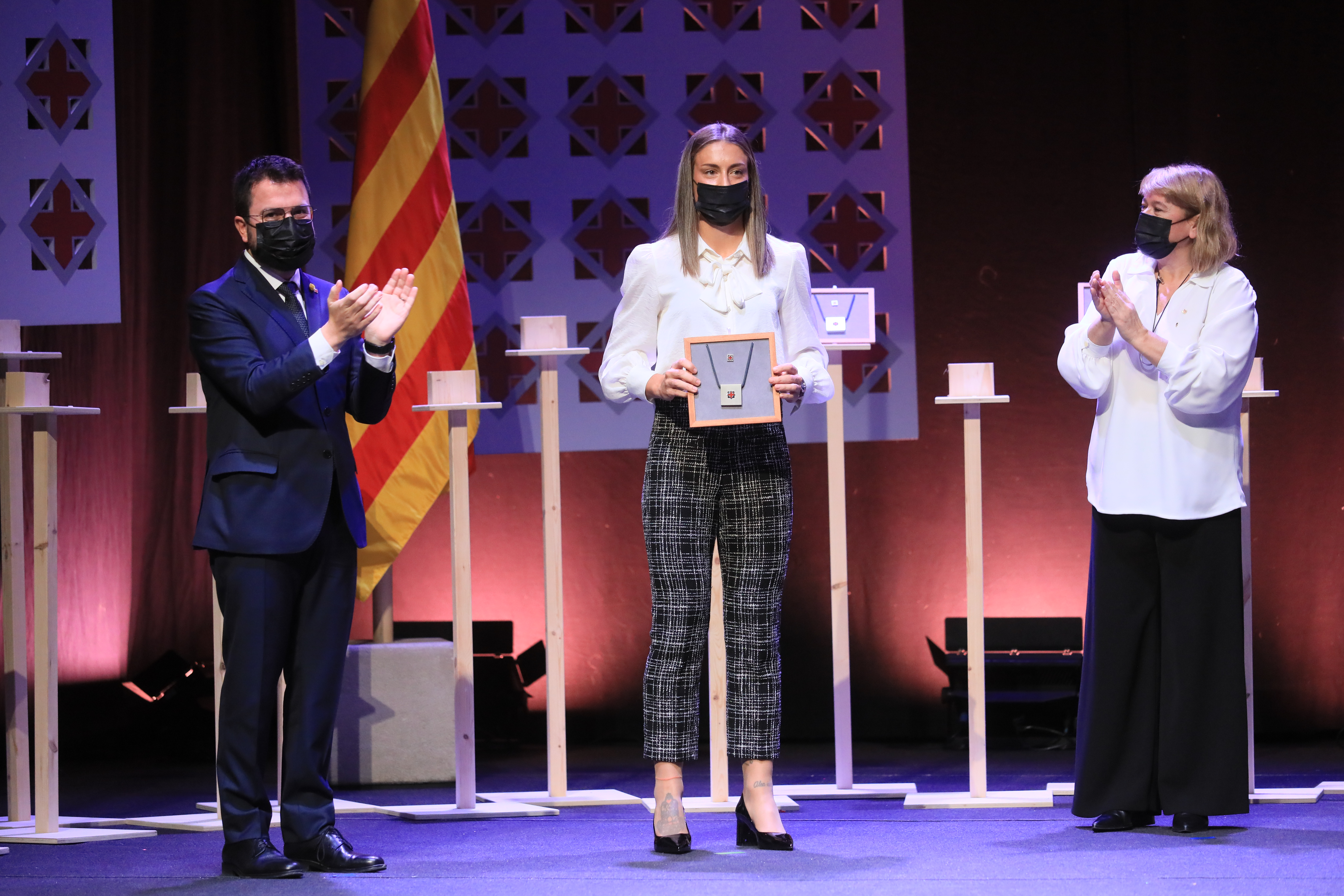
Putellas receiving the Creu de Sant Jordi in 2021

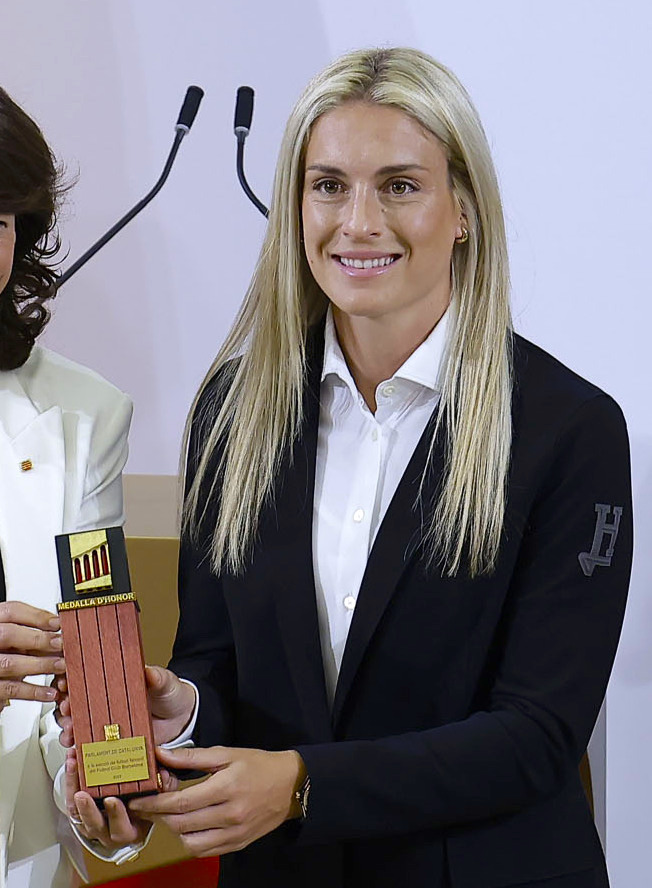
Putellas receiving the Medalla d'Honor del Parlament de Catalunya on behalf of Barcelona Femení in 2023

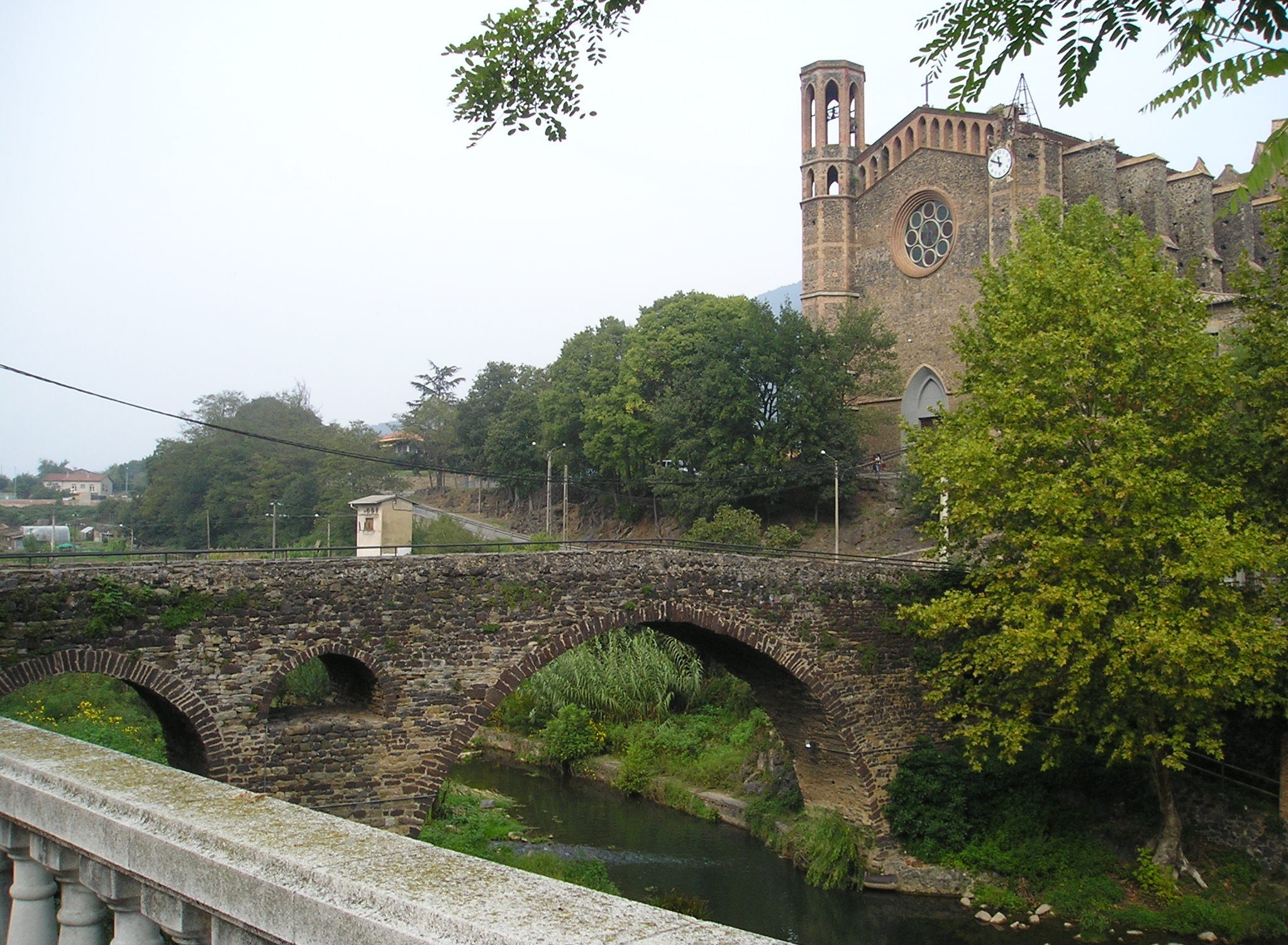
View from Mirador d'Alèxia Putellas in Sant Joan les Fonts

=== Media depictions of Putellas ===
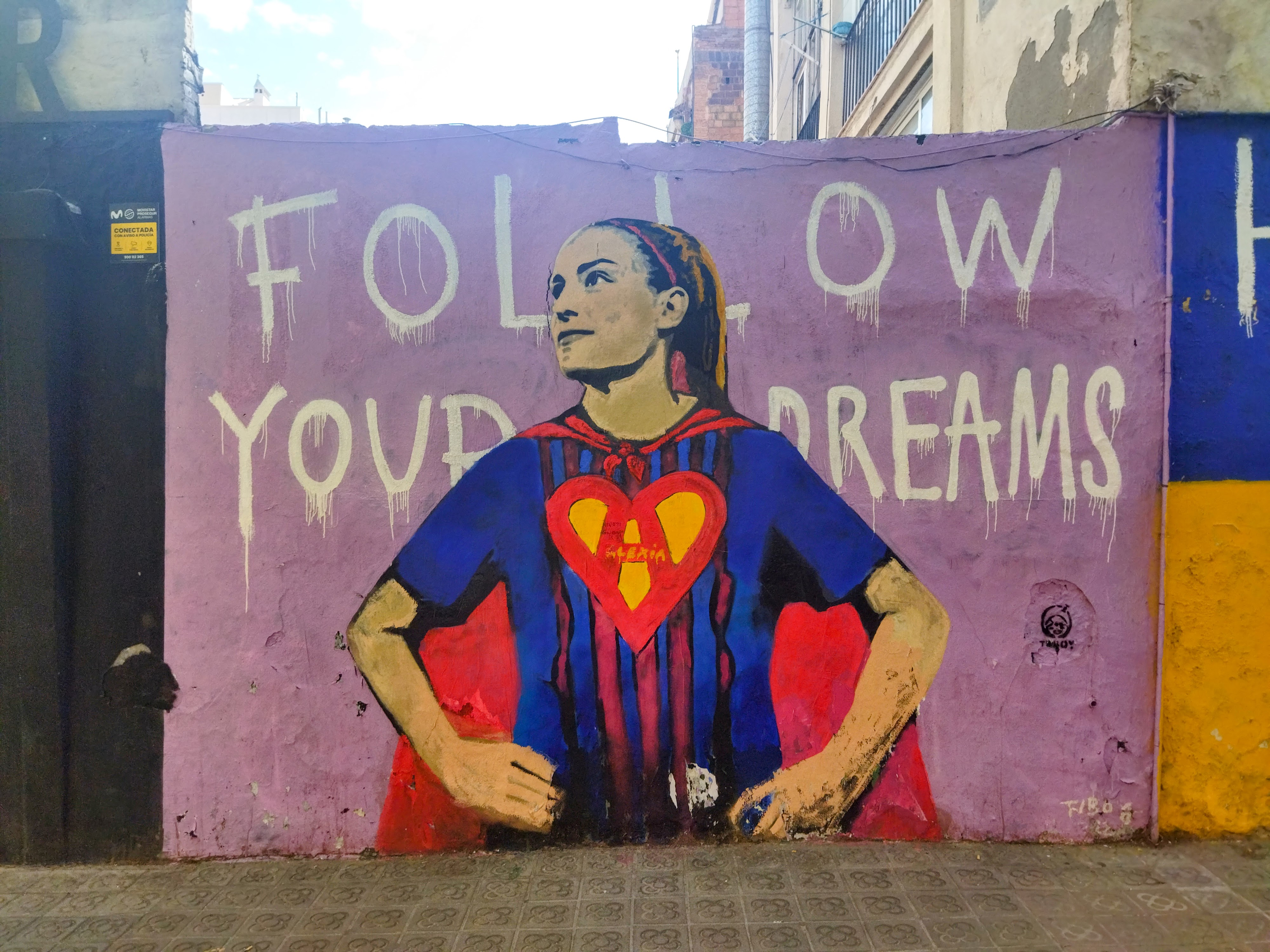
Street art in Barcelona depicting Putellas as Superwoman over text reading "follow your dreams"

Follow my dreams, a mural depicting Putellas as Superwoman, was painted by Italian neo-pop artist TVBoy in the neighbourhood of Gràcia in 2022. It was partially inspired by TVBoy's young daughter telling him she wanted to be a footballer like Putellas, and debuted on Father's Day in March 2022, with TVBoy saying that he hoped the mural would inspire more girls. The mural of Putellas has received many visits but, despite the popularity of both Putellas and the mural in their city, has also been vandalised. In January 2023 it was defaced with graffiti of lesbophobic slurs and misogynistic comments, being restored by TVBoy again in February.

At the Globe Soccer Awards in Dubai in 2021, an image of Putellas – named Women's Player of the Year at the ceremony – was displayed on the Burj Khalifa, the first time a woman's image has been displayed on the building. Artwork depicting her (combining her head and a golden ball) was included in the 2022 "Fútbol. Arte. Iconos. En ese orden." exhibit of famous footballers at the Casa Seat in Barcelona and, later that year, a wax figure of her was added to the Barcelona wax museum. Both of Putellas' Ballons d'Or are on display in the FC Barcelona Museum. The museum also presented digital NFT artworks depicting Putellas (Empowerment) and Cruyff (In a Way, Immortal) in 2023, which went on to be displayed at the Moco Museum in Amsterdam in 2024.

In 2022, Putellas was given an overall rating of 92 in the football simulation video game FIFA 23, the highest rating in the game for any player, including men. When the franchise rebranded in 2023, releasing EA Sports FC 24 as the next installment, Putellas had the joint-highest overall rating, at 91. Her player card's total statistics in FC 24 made her the highest-rated Ultimate Team player in the history of the franchise; as the first game with women's players available in Ultimate Team mode, Putellas' rating received some criticism from gamers who were not interested in women's football.

The first song on Brazilian band Skank's 2014 album Velocia is a tribute to Putellas. Titled "Alexia", it was inspired by her viral goal in the 2013 Copa de la Reina final and compares her to global icons including Messi, and Catalan icons Antoni Gaudí and Joan Miró, as well as commenting on her style of play. The band visited Putellas in Barcelona to play her the song and seek her approval before releasing it. The 2023 song "Alexia Putellas" by Ochoa featuring Laüra Bonsai is also named for her.

For Holy Week 2022, Easter monas depicting her in some way were the most popular design of mona in Catalonia, overtaking Messi designs. Putellas is one of the prominent Catalan women, along with teammate Bonmatí, showcased in the SX3 animated series Superheroïnes. A fiction biopic of Putellas' life, Alexia, written by Valentina Viso and Dani González, and directed by Lucía Alemany, is set to begin filming in 2026 and premiere in 2027.

=== Bibliography and filmography ===
Putellas is the author of a pseudo-autobiographical children's book series, Alexia Superfutbolista, with three books. She has been featured in various miniseries documenting female footballers. There have been two series focused on Putellas exclusively, both released in 2022: TV3's La nit d'Alèxia and Amazon Prime Video's Alexia: Labor Omnia Vincit. The latter was nominated for the International Emmy Award for Best Sports Documentary, the only Spanish nominee at the 51st International Emmy Awards. In 2025, Netflix documentary It's All Over: The Kiss That Changed Spanish Football, also featuring Putellas and named for her words, won at the 53rd International Emmy Awards in this category.

Alexia Putellas bibliography
Year	Book	Publisher
2021	Alexia y las promesas del fútbol	Alfaguara Infantil
2021	El campamento antibalones	Alfaguara Infantil
2022	Una rival sin igual	Alfaguara Infantil

Alexia Putellas filmography
Year	Work	Role	Format	Ref(s)
2021	Campeonas	Self	Rakuten TV miniseries	
2022	Queens of the Pitch	Self	Barça TV+ miniseries	
2022	La nit d'Alèxia	Self	TV3 miniseries	
2022	Alexia: Labor Omnia Vincit	Self	Amazon Prime Video miniseries	
2023	Equals	Self	UEFA video series, episode 3	
2024	It's All Over: The Kiss That Changed Spanish Football	Self	Netflix documentary film	

=== Advocacy ===
In 2019, Putellas spoke out against prison sentences for Catalan independence leaders in the aftermath of the 2017 Catalan independence referendum, tweeting in Catalan that the sentences were "not the solution" and calling for democratic processes to move forward. Putellas spoke Catalan (as well as English and Spanish) in her acceptance speech for her second Ballon d'Or, drawing anger from some people in Spain. In 2023, the dress she wore to this ceremony was auctioned at the People in Red gala to raise money for funding research into HIV/AIDS and other infectious diseases. Putellas had been part of the Madrid Pride parade for Madrid lesbian bar Fulanita de Tal in 2019.

=== Eleven Foundation ===
In 2015, when CF Mollet UE started a women's football section, Putellas was invited to be ambassador, a role she accepted; she regularly visits the club when she is in her hometown. This fuelled her interest in supporting formative women's football. When she was unable to play during her ACL injury and hit "one of [her] lowest points", Putellas started developing an initiative to support girls' football. She launched the Eleven Foundation in 2024, aiming to support girls through football and reduce inequality; it started with plans to provide football training for 300 girls around the world. In June 2026, Putellas was visiting Caracas, Venezuela, to launch a partnership between the foundation and the city's Liga Monumental when the 2026 Venezuela earthquakes struck. The following day, Putellas was able to confirm she and her family were safe.

=== Personal life ===
Putellas' first language is Catalan; she learned Spanish in school as a child and English in the 2020s. While Putellas does not discuss her romantic relationships, she has shared social media posts featuring partners. After winning the Champions League in 2023, a video of Putellas greeting her girlfriend in the stands went viral on TikTok. Putellas has celebrated goals by pointing her fingers to the sky in dedication to her father, who died in 2012. (Note: Attributed to multiple references:)

== Career statistics ==
=== Club ===
As of match played 25 October 2026

Appearances and goals by club, season and competition
Club	Season	League			National cup (Note: Includes Copa de la Reina, FA Women's Cup)		League cup (Note: Includes WSL Players Cup)		Continental		Other		Total	
Club	Season	Division	Apps	Goals	Apps	Goals	Apps	Goals	Apps	Goals	Apps	Goals	Apps	Goals
Espanyol	2009–10	Superliga Femenina	1	0	1	0	—		—				2	0
Espanyol	2010–11	Superliga Femenina	24	3	4	1	—		—				28	4
Espanyol	Total		25	3	5	1	—		—				30	4
Levante	2011–12	Primera División	34	15	—		—		—		—		34	15
Barcelona	2012–13	Primera División	30	12	5	1	—		2 (Note: Appearances in UEFA Women's Champions League)	0	2 (Note: Appearances in Copa Catalunya)	0	39	13
Barcelona	2013–14	Primera División	30	8	5	3	—		6	0	2	1	43	12
Barcelona	2014–15	Primera División	26	6	2	0	—		4	1	2	1	34	8
Barcelona	2015–16	Primera División	29	18	3	2	—		5	0	2	0	39	20
Barcelona	2016–17	Primera División	28	10	3	1	—		8	0	2	4	41	15
Barcelona	2017–18	Primera División	29	10	4	2	—		4	1	2	0	39	13
Barcelona	2018–19	Primera División	28	17	3	1	—		8	1	0	0	39	19
Barcelona	2019–20	Primera División	20	10	3 (Note: 2019–20 Copa de la Reina includes 2 matches played and 1 goal scored during the natural 2020–21 season due to the COVID-19 pandemic.)	1	—		6	3	4 (Note: Two appearances and two goals in Supercopa de España, two goals and two appearances in Copa Catalunya)	4	33	18
Barcelona	2020–21	Primera División	31	18	3	5	—		9	2	2 (Note: One appearance and one goal in Supercopa de España, one appearance and one goal in Copa Catalunya)	2	44	26
Barcelona	2021–22	Primera División	26	18	4	4	—		10	11	2 (Note: Appearances in Supercopa de España)	1	42	34
Barcelona	2022–23	Liga F	5	1	0	0	—		1	0	0	0	6	1
Barcelona	2023–24	Liga F	19	8	2	0	—		6	3	0	0	27	11
Barcelona	2024–25	Liga F	24	16	2	2	—		10	3	2	1	39	22
Barcelona	2025–26	Liga F	25	9	5	3	—		11	7	2	1	43	20
Barcelona	Total		350	156	44	25	—		85	32	23	13	508	232
London City Lionesses	2026–27	Women's Super League	7	3	0	0	2	0	—		—		9	3
Career total			416	177	49	26	2	0	85	32	23	13	581	254

=== International ===
As of match played 13 October 2026

Appearances and goals by national team and year
Year	Spain		Catalonia	
Year	Apps	Goals	Apps	Goals
2013	8	1	—N/a	
2014	7	0	1	0
2015	12	2	1	0
2016	9	3	1	1
2017	14	3	0	0
2018	9	4	—N/a	
2019	16	1	0	0
2020	6	4	—N/a	
2021	12	5	—N/a	
2022	7	4	—N/a	
2023	13	3	—N/a	
2024	15	2	0	0
2025	14	8	—N/a	
2026	8	3	—N/a	
Total	150	43	3	1

Scores and results list Spain's and Catalonia's goal tally first, score column indicates score after each Putellas goal.

List of international goals scored by Alexia Putellas
No.	Date	Venue	Opponent	Score	Result	Competition
Spain goals
1	12 July 2013	Linköping Arena, Linköping, Sweden	England	3–2	3–2	UEFA Women's Euro 2013
2	10 February 2015	Pinatar Arena, San Pedro del Pinatar, Spain	Austria	1–0	2–2	Friendly
3	27 October 2015	Sonera Stadium, Helsinki, Finland	Finland	1–0	2–1	UEFA Women's Euro 2017 qualifying
4	24 January 2016	Stadion pod Malim brdom, Petrovac, Montenegro	Montenegro	3–0	7–0	UEFA Women's Euro 2017 qualifying
5	8 April 2016	Complexo Desportivo da Covilhã, Covilhã, Portugal	Portugal	2–0	4–1	UEFA Women's Euro 2017 qualifying
6	15 September 2016	La Ciudad del Fútbol, Las Rozas de Madrid, Spain	Montenegro	12–0	13–0	UEFA Women's Euro 2017 qualifying
7	30 June 2017	Pinatar Arena, San Pedro del Pinatar, Spain	Belgium	1–0	7–0	Friendly
8	30 June 2017	Pinatar Arena, San Pedro del Pinatar, Spain	Belgium	3–0	7–0	Friendly
9	28 November 2017	Estadi de Son Moix, Palma, Spain	Austria	1–0	4–0	2019 FIFA Women's World Cup qualification
10	20 January 2018	Pinatar Arena, San Pedro del Pinatar, Spain	Netherlands	1–0	2–0	Friendly
11	5 March 2018	AEK Arena – Georgios Karapatakis, Larnaca, Cyprus	Czech Republic	2–0	2–0	2018 Cyprus Women's Cup
12	7 June 2018	La Condomina, Murcia, Spain	Israel	2–0	2–0	2019 FIFA Women's World Cup qualification
13	8 November 2018	Butarque, Leganés, Spain	Poland	2–1	3–1	Friendly
14	5 April 2019	Estadio Vicente Sanz, Don Benito, Spain	Brazil	1–1	2–1	Friendly
15	5 March 2020	Exploria Stadium, Orlando, United States	Japan	1–0	3–1	2020 SheBelieves Cup
16	11 March 2020	Toyota Stadium, Frisco, United States	England	1–0	1–0	2020 SheBelieves Cup
17	23 October 2020	La Cartuja, Seville, Spain	Czech Republic	4–0	4–0	UEFA Women's Euro 2022 qualifying
18	27 November 2020	La Ciudad del Fútbol, Las Rozas de Madrid, Spain	Moldova	7–0	10–0	UEFA Women's Euro 2022 qualifying
19	10 June 2021	Santo Domingo, Alcorcón, Spain	Belgium	2–0	3–0	Friendly
20	16 September 2021	Tórsvøllur, Tórshavn, Faroe Islands	Faroe Islands	4–0	10–0	2023 FIFA Women's World Cup qualification
21	26 October 2021	Kolos Stadium, Kovalivka, Ukraine	Ukraine	1–0	6–0	2023 FIFA Women's World Cup qualification
22	25 November 2021	La Cartuja, Seville, Spain	Faroe Islands	11–0	12–0	2023 FIFA Women's World Cup qualification
23	30 November 2021	La Cartuja, Seville, Spain	Scotland	6–0	8–0	2023 FIFA Women's World Cup qualification
24	17 February 2022	Riverside Stadium, Middlesbrough, England	Germany	1–0	1–1	2022 Arnold Clark Cup
25	23 February 2022	Molineux Stadium, Wolverhampton, England	Canada	1–0	1–0	2022 Arnold Clark Cup
26	7 April 2022	José Rico Pérez, Alicante, Spain	Brazil	1–0	1–1	Friendly
27	1 July 2022	Stadio Teofilo Patini, Castel di Sangro, Italy	Italy	1–1	1–1	Friendly
28	29 June 2023	Estadio Román Suárez Puerta, Avilés, Spain	Panama	2–0	7–0	Friendly
29	31 October 2023	Letzigrund, Zürich, Switzerland	Switzerland	2–0	7–1	2023–24 UEFA Women's Nations League
30	31 October 2023	Letzigrund, Zürich, Switzerland	Switzerland	4–0	7–1	2023–24 UEFA Women's Nations League
31	28 July 2024	Stade de la Beaujoire, Nantes, France	Nigeria	1–0	1–0	2024 Summer Olympics
32	31 July 2024	Nouveau Stade de Bordeaux, Bordeaux, France	Brazil	2–0	2–0	2024 Summer Olympics
33	8 April 2025	Balaídos, Vigo, Spain	Portugal	4–0	7–1	2025 UEFA Women's Nations League
34	8 April 2025	Balaídos, Vigo, Spain	Portugal	6–0	7–1	2025 UEFA Women's Nations League
35	3 July 2025	Stadion Wankdorf, Bern, Switzerland	Portugal	3–0	5–0	UEFA Women's Euro 2025
36	7 July 2025	Arena Thun, Thun, Switzerland	Belgium	1–0	6–2	UEFA Women's Euro 2025
37	7 July 2025	Arena Thun, Thun, Switzerland	Belgium	6–2	6–2	UEFA Women's Euro 2025
38	24 October 2025	La Rosaleda, Málaga, Spain	Sweden	1–0	4–0	2025 UEFA Women's Nations League Finals
39	24 October 2025	La Rosaleda, Málaga, Spain	Sweden	3–0	4–0	2025 UEFA Women's Nations League Finals
40	28 October 2025	Gamla Ullevi, Gothenburg, Sweden	Sweden	1–0	1–0	2025 UEFA Women's Nations League Finals
41	5 June 2026	Estadi Mallorca Son Moix, Palma de Mallorca, Spain	England	2–0	4–0	2027 FIFA World Cup qualification
42	5 June 2026	Estadi Mallorca Son Moix, Palma de Mallorca, Spain	England	3–0	4–0	2027 FIFA World Cup qualification
43	13 October 2026	Subaru Park, Chester, United States	United States	1–0	2–2	Friendly
Catalonia goals
1	22 December 2016	Estadio da Lomba, Vilagarcía de Arousa	(Galicia (Spain)) Galicia	2–0	5–0	Friendly

== Honours ==
Espanyol

- Copa de la Reina: 2010
- Copa Catalunya: 2008

Barcelona

- Primera División: 2012–13, 2013–14, 2014–15, 2019–20, 2020–21, 2021–22, 2022–23, 2023–24, 2024–25, 2025–26
- Copa de la Reina: 2013, 2014, 2017, 2018, 2019–20, 2020–21, 2021–22, 2023–24, 2024–25, 2025–26
- Supercopa de España: 2019–20, 2021–22, 2024–25, 2025–26
- Copa Catalunya: 2012, 2014, 2015, 2016, 2017, 2018, 2019
- UEFA Women's Champions League: 2020–21, 2022–23, 2023–24, 2025–26

Spain U17

- UEFA Women's Under-17 Championship: 2010, 2011

Spain

- FIFA Women's World Cup: 2023
- UEFA Women's Championship runner-up: 2025
- UEFA Women's Nations League: 2023–24, 2025

Individual

- Ballon d'Or Féminin: 2021, 2022, 2026
- The Best FIFA Women's Player: 2021, 2022
- Golden Player Woman Award: 2022
- UEFA Women's Player of the Year: 2020–21, 2021–22
- UEFA Women's Championship Team of the Tournament: 2025
- UEFA Women's Champions League Player of the Season: 2021–22, 2025–26
- UEFA Women's Champions League Midfielder of the Season: 2020–21
- UEFA Women's Champions League Squad of the Season: 2018–19, 2020–21, 2021–22, 2025–26
- UEFA Women's Champions League Best Goalscorer: 2021–22
- IFFHS Women's Player of the Year: 2021, 2022
- IFFHS Women's Playmaker of the Year: 2021, 2022
- International Sports Press Association – Best Female Athlete of the Year : 2022
- World Soccer Women's World Player of the Year: 2021
- Globe Soccer Women's Player of the Year: 2021 2022
- FIFA FIFPRO Women's World 11: 2022, 2024
- The Best FIFA Women's 11: 2025
- Trofeo Aldo Rovira: 2020–21, 2021–22
- Premi Barça Jugadors (Barça Players Award): 2018–19
- Catalan Women's Player of the Year: 2015, 2017, 2021, 2022
- Primera División MVP of the Season: 2019–20
- Copa de la Reina Final MVP: 2013, 2014, 2021
- Copa de la Reina Top goalscorer: 2020–21, 2021–22
- Spain women's national team Player of the Year: 2021
- Liga F Squad of the Season: 2023–24, 2024–25, 2025–26
- Liga F Player of the Month: October 2024
- Primera División Team of the Season: 2015–16, 2018–19
- GOAL50 Women's Player of the Year: 2021, 2022
- The 100 Best Female Footballers In The World #1: 2021, 2022
- Fútbol Draft Best XI: 2010, 2011, 2012, 2013, 2014, 2015
- Fútbol Draft Best Left Winger: 2010, 2011, 2013, 2014
- Fútbol Draft Best Left Central Midfielder: 2015
- SheBelieves Cup Tournament MVP: 2020
- IFFHS Women's World Team: 2021, 2022, 2025
- IFFHS Women's UEFA Team: 2021, 2022, 2024
- Creu de Sant Jordi: honoured 2021
- Gold Medal for Sporting Merit: honoured 2021
- Premio Reina Letizia: 2023
- International Sports Award Mollet: 2010, 2011

== See also ==
- List of women's footballers with 100 or more international caps
- List of FC Barcelona Femení players
- List of recipients of the Creus de Sant Jordi
