= It's All Over: The Kiss That Changed Spanish Football =

2024 Spanish documentary

- English-language release poster
- Spanish: SeAcabó: Diario de las campeonas
- Directed by: Joanna Pardos
- Written by: Carola Solé; Joanna Pardos
- Produced by: Javier Martínez; Luis Miguel Calvo
- Starring: Jennifer Hermoso; Alexia Putellas; Irene Paredes; Aitana Bonmatí
- Cinematography: Fran García Vera
- Edited by: Matías Fernández; Jordi Gallofré; Joan Solsona
- Production company: You First Originals
- Distributed by: Netflix
- Release date: 1 November 2024
- Running time: 94 minutes
- Country: Spain
- Language: Spanish

It's All Over: The Kiss That Changed Spanish Football (Spanish: #SeAcabó: Diario de las campeonas) is a Spanish sports documentary about the Rubiales case and Las 15 – major controversies about treatment of the Spain women's national football team – released globally on Netflix on 1 November 2024. It predominantly focuses on veteran players Jenni Hermoso, Alexia Putellas and Irene Paredes. In 2025, the documentary won the International Emmy Award for Best Sports Documentary.

== Featuring ==
Besides archive footage, the film features interviews and discussions with several members of the Spain women's national football team:

- Jennifer Hermoso
- Alexia Putellas
- Irene Paredes
- Aitana Bonmatí
- Teresa Abelleira
- Ivana Andrés
- Olga Carmona
- Laia Codina
- Lola Gallardo
- Sandra Paños

Verónica Boquete is also interviewed, though not included in the credits.

== Summary ==
Following a period of growth, the Spain women's football team won the 2023 FIFA Women's World Cup; after the victory in the final, then-Spanish Football Federation (RFEF) president Luis Rubiales kissed player Jenni Hermoso, among other incidents comprising the Rubiales case. The kiss received an instant negative response from onlookers around the world. It's All Over explores – through archive footage, scene-setting, and player discussions and interviews – how Rubiales and the RFEF pressurised Hermoso and other players to normalise Rubiales' behaviour, and how this maltreatment and pressure was typical of the RFEF throughout the history of the women's team. The players discuss previous incidents ranging from discrimination and poor coaching to the reasons behind the withdrawal of fifteen players in 2022 and the impact this had on the team, which set the background for Spain's 2023 World Cup run, and their responses to push for improvements in the national team. The documentary also explores the shifting attitude of the Spanish media towards the team, and how this impacted the players speaking out, as well as themes of solidarity, inspiration and fighting for equality. A sequence is dedicated to the players who withdrew and did not return to the squad.

== Production ==
The documentary was produced by You First Originals, from the same creative team behind the 2022 docu-series Alexia: Labor Omnia Vincit, which also featured Alexia Putellas. The title It's All Over (in English) or #SeAcabó (in Spanish) comes from the #SeAcabó equality movement that in turn took its name from a tweet posted by Putellas in response to Rubiales. The executive producers wrote in El País that even "in a market with 4,000 sports documentaries", they quickly knew that making It's All Over was necessary. Director Joanna Pardos had been filming Alexia when the fifteen players withdrew from selection in 2022, and was able to see first-hand what some of the experience of the team was at that time. This was not included in the documentary about Putellas to not risk jeopardising any of the players' careers, with Pardos saying that it was "the [kind of thing] most people wait to talk about until after they retire." Pardos spoke with Putellas after the 2023 World Cup final, and they agreed they should not wait any longer to talk about the rest of the RFEF's failings.

Production of It's All Over lasted almost fifteen months. The producers had started planning for it when the players became a unified group after the 25 August 2023 RFEF Assembly meeting in which Rubiales gave a speech and refused to resign. In the autumn of 2023, there were proposals from over twenty international production companies to produce a documentary about the Spain women's football team, with You First selected. The company credits their "complete approach" to the storytelling for their selection. Pardos felt that the situation spiralling due to Rubiales' behaviour after the World Cup final made Netflix more interested in You First's proposal, and she told Variety that more platforms were interested in their project the more the story gained attention; however, she wanted to make the documentary about the whole history and was displeased that it was branded "the kiss documentary".

Though Pardos said that she thought "it was a story that should be told as a film", It's All Over – like Alexia – was originally conceived as a three-part miniseries. This was later changed to be an approximately 90-minute film, setting the production back and forcing changes in the structural planning to account for the different format. The producers approached other players to take part in the documentary, but were rejected by some who still felt sharing their views could limit their careers, and said that the company itself "received pressure to limit [their] creative freedom, censorship in the context of the interviews, [and] calls to reconsider the project". The producers also offered people from the RFEF, including Rubiales and former coach Jorge Vilda, the right to reply and be featured, but they formally declined.

== Release ==
The film's age guidance ratings were informed by its content of sexual violence. In the UK it was certified 15, and in the US it was rated TV-MA. It was released globally on Netflix on 1 November 2024, a few days after Hermoso received the Sócrates Award for her work as an advocate of gender equality in football.

Spain called up its women's team for the first time following the documentary on 19 November 2024. Both Hermoso and Irene Paredes were dropped from the squad. Head coach Montse Tomé cited "team spirit" as the reason they were not invited to the team; as both players were featured prominently in the documentary, many in Spain speculated that they had been removed from the squad because of their involvement and public criticisms.

== Response ==
Prior to the documentary's release, there were varied reactions to it in Spanish society. Many people were supportive of the players being afforded the platform, while others had different negative responses based on what they assumed the documentary would focus on. Pardos encouraged those criticising the documentary before watching it to instead engage, saying that documentaries are made "to reflect, debate, and inspire thought".

In a review for Radio Times, Calum Baker said that the documentary has "a clear-eyed and propulsive story", with directorial choices that underscore its themes and a satisfying final act. Laia Bonals of El Periódico wrote that the documentary "is a demonstration of strength and sacrifice" for its entire runtime, provoking goosebumps, and that there is no better way to tell of everything that happened. Cinemagavia's Núria Molina Insa also felt that it was "ideal for someone who ... only knew of the final explosion", saying that the documentary's structure and method of recounting the events around the World Cup as well as before provided all the context for Rubiales' speech and the resulting #SeAcabó movement. She also thought it was a fitting tribute to the players, noting the documentary's additional significance as an account of the historic first World Cup victory.

Molina Insa felt that although it was strong thematically, the documentary was unoriginal in its technical aspects; however, she said this was a positive, that the format "does a good job of putting the different pieces together". She criticised the fast pacing, but suggested that this "will surely work" for people more familiar with documentaries. Carmen Gómez Mariñas of La Voz de Galicia felt it was an unconventional sports documentary, due to intertwining the journey of sporting triumph with the players' accounts of how the staff mistreated them, and because the major victory depicted is a social rather than sporting one.

It was submitted for consideration in nine categories of the 39th Goya Awards and won the International Emmy Award for Best Sports Documentary at the 53rd International Emmy Awards.

== See also ==
- Breaking the Silence (2021 documentary)
- Disputes involving the Spain women's national football team
- List of association football films
