= Alexia: Labor Omnia Vincit =

2022 Spanish television documentary

- Genre: Sports documentary
- Directed by: Joanna Pardos
- Starring: Alexia Putellas
- Country of origin: Spain
- Original language: Spanish

Production
- Producers: Javier Martínez; Luis Calvo
- Production locations: Barcelona, Spain; Turin, Italy; Paris, France
- Cinematography: Alan Fàbregas
- Running time: 41–48 minutes (136 minutes total)
- Production companies: You First Originals; Barça Studios; Amazon Studios

Original release
- Network: Amazon Prime Video
- Release: 30 November 2022

Alexia: Labor Omnia Vincit (also released as simply Alexia, and stylised as A L E X I A) is a Spanish sports documentary miniseries about FC Barcelona Femení and Spain football player Alexia Putellas, released by Amazon Prime Video in most Ibero-American countries on 30 November 2022.

Following Putellas for a year between winning her first and second Ballons d'Or, the series initially intended to document both Putellas' history with Barcelona and Spain, and her 2021–22 season, including the 2022 Euro; with Putellas suffering a season-ending injury days before the Euro, the series shifted tone. Continuing to focus on Putellas' mindset, it additionally presents struggles of elite athletes and injuries.

The episode titles are all taken from Latin mottos that Putellas has tattooed, used to allude to her greatness in her sport and reflect the personal nature of the series.

== Featuring ==
People appearing in the mini-series include:

- Alexia Putellas
- Xavi Llorens
- Jonatan Giráldez
- Mapi León
- Aitana Bonmatí
- Jana Fernàndez
- Irene Paredes
- Virginia Torrecilla
- Xavi
- Gerard Piqué
- Andrés Iniesta
- Robert Lewandowski
- Marc-Andre ter Stegen
- Ansu Fati
- Camille Abily
- Nadine Keßler
- Silvia Neid
- Martina Voss-Tecklenburg
- Eli Segura (Putellas' mother)
- Adrián Martínez (Putellas' physiotherapist)
- Miriam Chaves (Putellas' friend)
- Marc Guinot (Putellas' friend)

== Production ==
Footballer Alexia Putellas was approached about making a documentary following her first Ballon d'Or Féminin win in November 2021; she initially refused, later accepting because there were very few documentaries about female sportspeople. The production team then followed her for a year. Josep María Figueras, Putellas' representative and head of talent at agency You First, said that they received many offers to make biopics at the time, deciding to produce such a project to use Putellas' story to inspire others.

Putellas had been one of the players profiled in the 2021 Rakuten TV miniseries Campeonas. In January 2022, TV3 broadcast a three-part Catalan language documentary miniseries about Putellas' rise and gender equality in football through the lens of her journey, La nit d'Alèxia. In February 2022, the six-part Barça TV+ miniseries Queens of the Pitch began airing; focusing on FC Barcelona Femení during the 2020–21 season in which they won the domestic double and the Champions League, this miniseries was considered a success. Putellas said in March 2022 that the club "said they should record documentaries every year if they end like that!"

Having begun filming in early 2022, the three-part Alexia: Labor Omnia Vincit miniseries was announced on 16 June 2022, by Putellas in an appearance on Spanish chat show El Hormiguero. It planned to focus on Putellas' rise with Barcelona femení and her journey to the UEFA Women's Euro 2022 with Spain. At the start of July 2022, Putellas suffered an anterior cruciate ligament injury, preventing her from going to the Euro and taking her out of football for an extended period. The production team then put filming on hold and proposed a new direction for the project. Figueras felt that including the injury, and Putellas' change after it, in the show was an opportunity to present the reality of an elite athlete. He has also suggested that it leaves open the possibility for another episode, later, on her return.

The title contains the Latin motto Labor omnia vincit, "work conquers all"; Putellas has a back tattoo of the extended phrase "labor omnia vincit improbus". In the title, the "xi" in Putellas' name is stylised differently to highlight the Roman numeral for eleven, Putellas' shirt number.

Mundo Deportivo reported on 2 December 2022 that a second season of the miniseries has been planned.

== Release and marketing ==
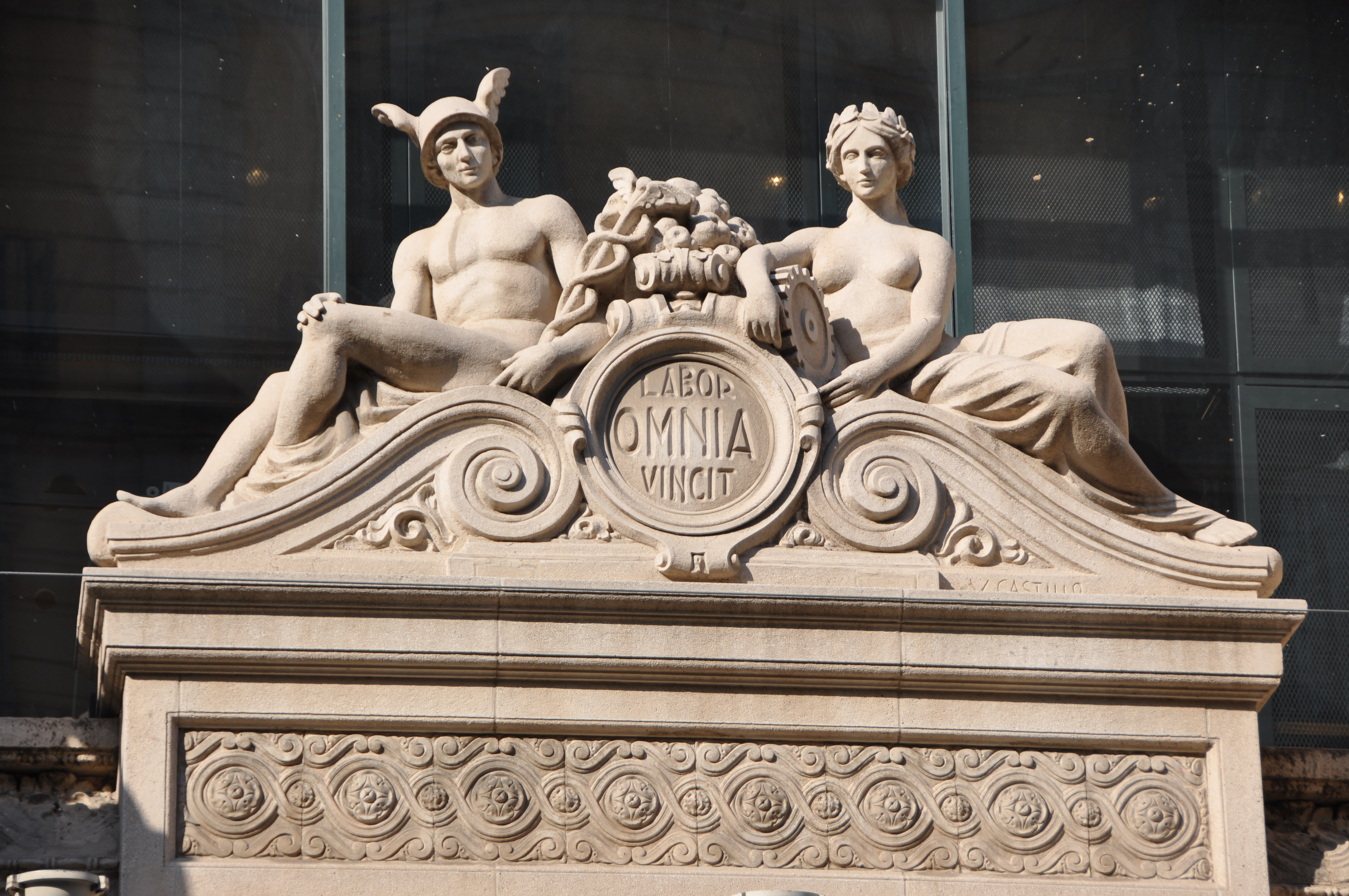
Neoclassical sculpture El Comerç i la Indústria (Lluís Faulí, 1926, displaying the Latin motto "Labor omnia vincit") on the Can Jorba, Portal de l'Àngel, Barcelona

Two trailers were released by Amazon Prime Video before a release date for the documentary was announced; the first trailer, in September 2022, focused on Putellas' rise to the top of women's football, while the second, in November 2022, focused on the season-ending injury she suffered and her second Ballon d'Or win (which occurred in October 2022). The documentary was released on Amazon Prime Video on 30 November 2022, available in Spain, Portugal, and Latin America excluding Brazil and Mexico. In March 2023, Abacus acquired the media rights to the series for much of the rest of the world (not including Spain, Portugal, Andorra, Latin America and the United States).

A poster for the show was also released, depicting Putellas like a Greek goddess. Using Latin for the subtitle and episode titles is also a nod to Classical antiquity as well as reflecting Putellas' personality and attitude towards football. Director Joanna Pardos has said the Classical imagery intends to highlight how Putellas has achieved a rare status in football usually only afforded to men, that she can be seen as a goddess on Olympus among gods.

On 29 November 2022, the anniversary of Putellas' first Ballon d'Or win and the day before the general release of the show, a premiere was held at the Teatre Lliure in Barcelona. The premiere, which ran an hour and a half behind schedule, was attended by several Barcelona femení players and other figures of the wider club, as well as other Catalan figures including sports personalities Bojan Krkić, Gemma Mengual and Ona Carbonell, and musicians Rigoberta Bandini and Carlos Sadness.

It was made available on Barça TV+ on 31 May 2023. In July 2023, all three episodes were added to the in-flight entertainment catalogue of Qatar Airways.

The series was released in Germany, Austria, Switzerland, Liechtenstein and the United Kingdom in July and August 2023 on subscription network Sky. Episodes were broadcast to coincide with Spain's knockout matches at the 2023 FIFA Women's World Cup on Sky Documentaries in the UK, and on both Sky Documentaries and Sky Sport in the German-speaking countries, where it was released as Alexia Putellas: Ikone des Fußballs.

== Episodes ==
No.	Title	Directed by	Original release date
1	"Ad Maiora"	Joanna Pardos	30 November 2022
FC Barcelona Femení, led by Alexia Putellas, defeat Real Madrid Femenino in the UEFA Women's Champions League quarter-final at Camp Nou, setting an attendance record of 91,533. Putellas and her mother discuss her experience of football as a child, and with friends and colleagues Putellas discusses her dedication to the game. The episode title, "Ad Maiora", is another Latin motto, meaning "towards greatness", that Putellas has tattooed.
2	"Alea Iacta Est"	Joanna Pardos	30 November 2022
Alexia Putellas travels to Paris to collect her second Ballon d'Or Féminin. She discusses the loss of her father and how she deals with defeat. The title is another Latin motto Putellas has tattooed, "Alea iacta est", meaning "the die is cast".
3	"Labor Omnia Vincit"	Joanna Pardos	30 November 2022
Barcelona Femení are unsuccessful in defending their Champions League title in the final against record-holders Olympique Lyonnais Féminin in Turin. Alexia Putellas meets up with the Spain women's national football team to train for the UEFA Women's Euro 2022, suffering an anterior cruciate ligament injury. She further discusses her career. The episode title shares its origin with the series' subtitle.

== Reception ==
In a review, Cinemagavia gave the series a 70% overall, writing that its editing and narrative structure worked well for the sports documentary genre and for telling Putellas' story, adding that it is essential viewing in understanding her importance in Spanish football. Defector also reviewed it positively; agreeing that some moments show "how peerless Putellas is", reviewer Emile Avanessian instead found that its strength was in subverting the sports documentary genre by predominantly focusing on failure and setbacks without a triumphant ending. Avanessian wrote that the documentary provided "illuminating" insight uncommon to the genre, and that it was beneficial to Putellas and women's sports for allowing "the much sadder story" to be told.

For the week to 3 December 2022, the show was in the top ten most popular on Prime Video España, as it also was the following week. Mundo Deportivo wrote that the series was a success and, along with other documentaries about female footballers set to be released shortly afterwards, "confirmed women's football as a real goldmine" in terms of making popular shows.

Though the series did not cover the rupturing of the Spain women's national team in September 2022, it features a much-discussed moment of Putellas in April 2022, expressing futility towards going to the European Championship and her view that Spain does not provide its women's team with as much support as other countries, making them not real contenders for international titles.

In 2023, the series is nominated for the International Emmy Award for Best Sports Documentary, the only Spanish nominee at the 51st International Emmy Awards.
