= International Emmy Award for Best Sports Documentary =

Television award category

- Country: United States
- Presented by: International Academy of Television Arts and Sciences
- First award: 2022
- Currently held by: It's All Over: The Kiss That Changed Spanish Football; Spain (2025)
- Website: www.iemmys.tv

The International Emmy Award for Best Sports Documentary is presented by the International Academy of Television Arts & Sciences (IATAS) to honor the best sports documentaries produced and originally aired outside the United States. The award was first introduced in 2022 at the 50th annual International Emmys Awards.

== Rules and regulations ==
According to the rules of the International Academy, a sports documentary is "a factual presentation dedicated to physical or mind sports activities (e.g., team, individual, extreme, esports, intellectual, etc.), sports competitions, and/or sportspersons."

To qualify for the category, the program must be at least 20 minutes in length and must be a single edited program, broadcast in one or more episodes. If the program is a series, two episodes must be submitted to represent the series as a whole. The program may employ partial reenactments, stock footage, stills, animation, stop-motion, or other techniques, as long as the emphasis is on fact and not on fiction.

== Winners and nominees ==
=== 2020s ===
| Year | English title | Original title | Production company/Network | Country |
|---|---|---|---|---|
| 2022 | Queen of Speed | | Sky / Drum Studios | United Kingdom |
| 2022 | Chivas | | Film 45 / Amazon / CobraFilms | Mexico |
| 2022 | Kiyou's Kata | Kiyou No Kata | Kansai Television | Japan |
| 2022 | Nadia | | Federation Entertainment / Echo Studio | France |
| 2023 | Harley & Katya | | Stranger Than Fiction Films | Australia |
| 2023 | 30 Dias Para Ganar | | North Films / N+Docs / ViX+ | Mexico |
| 2023 | Alexia: Labor Omnia Vincit | | You First Originals | Spain |
| 2023 | Two Sides | | T+W / Whisper Cymru | South Africa |
| 2024 | Brawn: The Impossible Formula 1 Story | | North One Television | United Kingdom |
| 2024 | Tan Cercas de la Nubes | | N+Docs / Éramos Tantos / Ruta 66 Cine / Filmadora / ViX | Mexico |
| 2024 | Tour de France | | Quadbox / Netflix | France |
| 2024 | WHO I AM Paralympic | | WOWOW Inc. / Acrobat Film | Japan |
| 2025 | It's All Over: The Kiss That Changed Spanish Football | #SeAcabó: Diario de las campeonas | You First Originals | Spain |
| 2025 | Argentina '78 | | Disney+ Original Productions / Pampa Films | Argentina |
| 2025 | Chasing the Sun 2 | | T+W | South Africa |
| 2025 | Sven | | Whisper / Up & Away Film Entertainment / Prime Video | United Kingdom |
| 2026 | Baila, Vini | | Conspiração / Netflix | Brazil |
| 2026 | Time-Out | Temps Mort | 3cat (TV3) / El Terrat (The Mediapro Studio) | Spain |
| 2026 | The Philipstown Wirecar Grand Prix | | Giant Films | South Africa |
| 2026 | Tom Daley: 1.6 Seconds | | Olympic Channel / Warner Bros. Discovery / Western Edge Pictures | United Kingdom |

== See also ==
- List of International Emmy Award winners
