= FC Barcelona media =

Barça TV
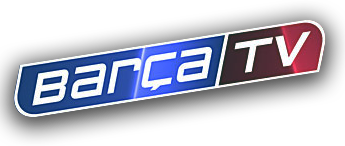
- Country: Spain
- Network: FC Barcelona
- Headquarters: Camp Nou, Barcelona

Ownership
- Owner: FC Barcelona

History
- Launched: 16 September 1996; 30 years ago
- Closed: 30 June 2023; 3 years ago
- Former names: Canal Barça

Links
- Website: barcatv.fcbarcelona.com

The FC Barcelona media consists of three platforms: R@dio Barça, BARÇA Magazine and Barça TV (Catalan pronunciation: [ˈbaɾsə ˈte ˈβe]) (until 2023). Formerly a television channel, it was operated by FC Barcelona. The channel was available in Catalan, Spanish and English. It was located at the Camp Nou stadium in Barcelona.

== FC Barcelona media ==
=== R@dio Barça ===
R@dio Barça (Catalan pronunciation: [ˈraðiu ˈβaɾsə]) is a Spanish radio network operated by FC Barcelona on its official website. Match commentaries are available on R@dio Barça for all first team games, including friendlies. In order to gain as wide an audience as possible, broadcasts are in three languages: Catalan, English and Spanish.

=== BARÇA Magazine ===
Since November 2002, the Journal is publishing BARÇA that, bimonthly, Club members receive and subscribers who wish in your current casa. La official magazine, covering the gap left by 'The Club veu' ('the Voice of the Club '), usually 68 pages in which information is power reflection and analysis about FC Barcelona, fleeing from the voracity of the day to day Club. The specific stories are interwoven with sections number still, like 'We talk to ...', 'What happened?', 'What a night!', 'The ex ...', 'the Thing' and 'Treasures', among others, which extend the recognition of people linked to the Bank and historical chapters of FC Barcelona. In addition, a large section of the news service reports, offers and promotions that are available to members of the Department of Communication Club. El Club is who assumes the development of information content, although some numbers are used to having the collaboration and the opinion of recognized personalities that complement each copy with input criteria and with a very specialized. Meanwhile, the Marketing Department is in charge of commercial coordination.

== Shutdown ==
On 28 April 2023, FC Barcelona announced that it would be shutting down Barça TV by 30 June 2023 due to cost-cutting measures after 26 years, and would focus on its online streaming platform, Barça TV+.

== Footnotes ==
- Ferrand, Alain; McCarthy, Scott (2008). Marketing the Sports Organisation: Building Networks and Relationships. Taylor & Francis. ISBN 978-0-415-45329-5.
- Fisk, Peter (2008). Business Genius: A More Inspired Approach to Business Growth. John Wiley and Sons. ISBN 978-1-84112-790-3.
- Bott, Steffen (2007). Internationalisierungsstrategien von nationalen Fußballligen- Auslandsvermarktung der Bundesligavereine und der DFL Deutsche Fußball Liga GmbH in Asien, insbesondere in der Republik Korea (südkorea) (in German). GRIN Verlag. ISBN 978-3-638-68892-5.
