= 2018–19 FC Barcelona Femení season =

FC Barcelona Femení
2018–19 season
- Chairman: Josep Maria Bartomeu
- Manager: Fran Sánchez (until 8 January); Lluís Cortés (from 8 January)
- Stadium: Mini Estadi / Joan Gamper
- Primera División: 2nd
- Copa de la Reina: Semi-finals
- Copa Catalunya: Winners
- Champions League: Final
- Top goalscorer: League: Alexia Putellas (16 goals); All: Alexia Putellas (18 goals)
Home colours	Away colours

The 2018–19 season was the 31st season in the history of FC Barcelona Femení, its 18th season as FC Barcelona's official women's football section and its 11th consecutive season in Primera División.

== Season overview ==
On June 4, 2018, the club announced their first transfer- the arrival of Dutch defender and 2017 UEFA Women's EURO winner Stefanie van der Gragt from AFC Ajax.

On June 6, 2018, the club announced the retirement of Spanish goalkeeper Andrea Giménez after two years with the club.

On June 12, 2018, the club announced that Spanish defender Ruth García would return to her previous club Levante UD Femenino, where she played for nine years. García was at Barcelona for five years.

On June 19, 2018, the club announced the signing of French midfielder Kheira Hamraoui from French club Lyon.

On June 25, 2018, the club announced the signing of Mexican goalkeeper Pamela Tajonar from Sevilla, where she spent 4 seasons.

On June 30, 2018, six player contracts expired. Of those were Danish defender Line Røddik Hansen, who transferred to Danish side FC Nordsjælland, Spanish goalkeeper and club captain Laura Ràfols who retired after 14 years with the club, and young defender Perle Morroni, who returned to Paris-Saint Germain after the expiration of a six-month loan deal.

On July 2, 2018, the club announced the departure of Spanish forward Olga García to Atlético Madrid after 3 years with the club.

On July 24, 2018, Marta Unzué was sent to Athletic Club on a two-year loan deal.

On August 25, 2018, Barcelona won their seventh and fifth-consecutive Copa Catalunya by defeating Espanyol 7-0.

On January 8, 2019, following a draw to league rivals Espanyol, the club announced the termination of coach Fran Sanchez's contract. Former Catalan national team coach Lluís Cortés assumed his role the same day.

On December 31, 2018, Élise Bussaglia left the club and transferred to French side Dijon.

On January 31, 2019, at the end of the January transfer window, the club signed striker Asisat Oshoala on a 6-month loan deal from Chinese club Dalian Quanjian. Oshoala was given Bussaglia's vacated number 20.

On February 17, 2019, Barcelona exited the Copa de la Reina following a 2-0 loss to eventual champions Atlético Madrid.

On March 27, 2019, Barcelona defeated LSK Kvinner in the UWCL and reached their second ever UWCL semifinal, where they would play FC Bayern Munich.

With goals by Kheira Hamraoui in the first leg and a Mariona Caldentey penalty in the second leg, Barcelona ended their semifinal tie on April 28 with a 2-0 aggregate score and reached their first ever UWCL final.

The league race went down to the final day, but Barcelona fell to Granadilla on the final match day. With an Atleti win, the league ended with Atleti receiving 86 points and Barcelona receiving 78, making it the 4th season in a row that Barcelona finished second in the league.

On May 18, 2019, Barcelona played their first UWCL final against European powerhouse Lyon. The match ended in a 4-1 loss for Barcelona, the single Barcelona goal in the match coming from Asisat Oshoala.

Despite having relative success in all competitions, this was the first year since 2010 where Barcelona went trophyless (not including the Copa Catalunya).

== Results ==
=== League ===
==== League table ====
Pos	Team	Pld	W	D	L	GF	GA	GD	Pts	Qualification or relegation
1	Atlético de Madrid (C)	30	28	0	2	96	19	+77	84	Qualification for the UEFA Champions League
2	Barcelona	30	25	3	2	94	15	+79	78	Qualification for the UEFA Champions League
3	Levante	30	17	6	7	52	26	+26	57	
4	Granadilla	30	17	3	10	46	40	+6	54	
5	Athletic Club	30	14	8	8	48	33	+15	50	

Source: La Liga
Rules for classification: 1) points; 2) head-to-head points; 3) goal difference; 4) number of goals scored
(C) Champions

==== League Matches ====
9 September 2018 1	Athletic Club	0–1	Barcelona	Lezama
12:00 CEST		Report	Álvarez 21' (o.g.)	Stadium: Estadio Santa María de Lezama; Attendance: 1,614; Referee: Marta Frías

22 September 2018 3	Espanyol	0–3	Barcelona	San Adrián de Besós
12:00 CEST		Report	Torralbo 48'; Andonova 74'; Mariona 82'	Stadium: Ciutat Esportiva Dani Jarque; Attendance: 875; Referee: Cebollada Lopez

30 September 2018 4	Albacete	1-6	Barcelona	Albacete
18:00 CEST		Report	Mariona 41'; Aitana 43', 70'; Martens; Losada 84'; Andonova 86'	Stadium: Ciudad Deportiva Andrés Iniesta; Attendance: 450; Referee: Elena Arnillas

14 October 2018 5	Barcelona	9–1	Rayo Vallecano	Barcelona
18:00 CEST	Putellas 17', 44', 48', 58'; Alves 32' (pen.), 67'; Caldentey 43'; Aitana 60'; Perarnau 89' (o.g.)	Report	del Álamo 90'	Stadium: Mini Estadi; Attendance: 751; Referee: Elena Casal

21 October 2018 6	Sporting de Huelva	1–3	Barcelona	Huelva
13:00 CEST	Bonsegundo 62'	Report	Hamraoui 39'; Putellas 56'; Losada 75'	Stadium: Campo Federativo de la Orden; Attendance: 2000; Referee: Arantza Gallastegui

24 October 2018 2PP	Barcelona	0–0	Levante UD	Sant Joan Despí
18:00 CEST		Report		Stadium: Ciutat Esportiva Joan Gamper; Attendance: 700; Referee: Marta Huerta

28 October 2018 7	Barcelona	3-0	Real Betis	Sant Joan Despí
14:00 CEST	Aitana 12'; Duggan 5'; Patri 89'	Report		Stadium: Ciutat Esportiva Joan Gamper; Attendance: 514; Referee: Zulema González

4 November 2018 8	Valencia CF	0–0	Barcelona	Paterna
13:00 CEST		Report		Stadium: Estadio Antonio Puchades; Attendance: 1200; Referee: María Martínez

18 November 2018 9	Barcelona	2–1	Atletico Madrid	Barcelona
18:00 CEST	Aitana 65'; Duggan 90+1'	Report	Robles 56'	Stadium: Mini Estadi; Attendance: 4616; Referee: Marta Huerta

21 November 2018 10	Real Sociedad	2–5	Barcelona	Lasarte-Oria
20:45 CEST	Bautista 10'; García 59'	Report	Lieke Martens 7', 18'; Duggan 12', 39'; Aitana 50'	Stadium: Estadio Zubieta XXI; Attendance: 480; Referee: Elena Casal

2 December 2018 11	Barcelona	3–0	UD Granadilla Tenerife	Sant Joan Despí
13:00 CEST	Aitana 39', 69'; Putellas 57'	Report		Stadium: Ciutat Esportiva Joan Gamper; Attendance: 590; Referee: Marta Frías

5 December 2018 12	Sevilla	0–2	Barcelona	Sevilla
16:00 CEST		Report	Putellas 33', 56'	Stadium: Estadio Jesús Navas; Attendance: 712; Referee: Beatriz Cuesta

9 December 2019 13	Barcelona	7–0	Madrid CFF	Sant Joan Despí
13:30 CEST	Putellas 5'; Duggan 8'; Patri 11'; Torrejón 18'; Alves 51' (pen.); Andújar 60'; Clàudia 70'	Report		Stadium: Ciutat Esportiva Joan Gamper; Attendance: 480; Referee: Elia Martínez

15 December 2018 14	Barcelona	2–0	EdF Logroño	Sant Joan Despí
15:00 CEST	León 31'; Clàudia 88'	Report		Stadium: Ciutat Esportiva Joan Gamper; Attendance: 300; Referee: Villegas Navas

22 December 2018 15	Málaga CF	0–4	Barcelona	Málaga
12:00 CEST		Report	Patri 17', 80'; Duggan 24'; Martens 69'	Stadium: Estadio Francisco Romero; Attendance: 902; Referee: Beatriz Arregui Gamir

6 January 2019 16	Barcelona	0–0	Espanyol	Sant Joan Despí
13:00 CEST		Report		Stadium: Ciutat Esportiva Joan Gamper; Attendance: 550; Referee: Elena Casal

12 January 2019 17	Levante UD	0–1	Barcelona	Buñol
13:00 CEST		Report	Mariona 65'	Stadium: Ciudad Deportiva de Buñol; Attendance: 700; Referee: Marta Huerta

27 January 2019 18	Barcelona	2–1	Athletic Club	Barcelona
13:00 CEST	Martens 40'; Putellas 65'	Report	Lucía García 90+2'	Stadium: Mini Estadi; Attendance: 1288; Referee: Cebollada Lopez

3 February 2019 19	Barcelona	3–1	Albacete	Barcelona
16:00 CEST	Mariona 31'; Torrejón 59', 78'	Report	Alba 57'	Stadium: Mini Estadi; Attendance: 890; Referee: María Romero

10 February 2019 20	Rayo Vallecano	0-4	Barcelona	Madrid
13:00 CEST		Report	Putellas 15'; Martens 16'; Mariona 29'; Oshoala 63'	Stadium: Ciudad Deportiva Rayo Vallecano; Attendance: 476; Referee: Villegas Navas

13 February 2019 21	Barcelona	2–3	Sporting de Huelva	Barcelona
18:30 CEST	Oshoala 17', 84'	Report	Raquel 59' van der Gragt 61' (o.g.); Bonsegundo 67'	Stadium: Mini Estadi; Attendance: 463; Referee: Zulema González

24 February 2019 22	Real Betis	0–3	Barcelona	Sevilla
13:00 CEST		Report	Putellas 37'; Martens 47'; Mariona 80'	Stadium: Ciudad Deportiva Luis del Sol; Attendance: 715; Referee: Beatriz Arregui Gamir

12 March 2019 23	Barcelona	4–1	Real Sociedad	Sant Joan Despí
17:30 CEST	Oshoala 18'; Aitana 33'; Torrejón 35'; Alves 76'	Report	García 27'	Stadium: Ciutat Esportiva Joan Gamper; Attendance: 380; Referee: Elia Martínez

17 March 2019 24	Atletico Madrid	0–2	Barcelona	Madrid
14:00 CEST		Report	Oshoala 65'; Duggan 80'	Stadium: Estadio Wanda Metropolitano; Attendance: 60,739; Referee: María Martínez

23 March 2019 25	Barcelona	3–0	Valencia CF	Barcelona
19:00 CEST	Duggan 18'; Torrejón 84'; Martens 87'	Report		Stadium: Mini Estadi; Attendance: 2168; Referee: Zulema González

31 March 2019 26	EdF Logroño	0–4	Barcelona	Logroño
17:00 CEST		Report	Martens 3'; Aitana 5'; Mariona 45'; Putellas 55'	Stadium: Estadio Las Gaunas; Attendance: 4220; Referee: Rivera Olmedo

13 April 2019 27	Barcelona	6–0	Málaga CF	Sant Joan Despí
18:30 CEST	Mariona 25'; Putellas 53'; Duggan 55'; Torrejón 73'; Andressa Alves 74', 87'	Report		Stadium: Ciutat Esportiva Joan Gamper; Attendance: 647; Referee: Marta Frías

17 April 2019 28	Madrid CFF	0–4	Barcelona	Madrid
00:00 CEST		Report	Martens 17'; Aitana 44'; Putellas 51', 62'	Stadium: Centro Deportivo Municipal Luis Aragonés; Attendance: 400; Referee: Cebollada Lopez

24 April 2019 29	Barcelona	6–2	Sevilla	Barcelona
00:00 CEST	Martens 11'; Oshoala 30', 34' van der Gragt 42'; Aitana 63'; Andújar 83'	Report	Karpova 36'; León 39' (o.g.)	Stadium: Mini Estadi; Attendance: 428; Referee: Beatriz Cuesta

5 May 2019 30	UD Granadilla Tenerife	1–0	Barcelona	San Isidro
13:00 CEST	Pérez 56'	Report		Stadium: Estadio La Palmera; Attendance: 2453; Referee: Arantza Gallastegui

=== UEFA Women's Champions League ===
==== Round of 32 ====
12 September 2018 First Leg	BIIK Kazygurt (Kazakhstan)	3–1	(Spain) Barcelona	Shymkent
13:00 (17:00 ALMT)	Putellas 45+6' (o.g.); Ikwaput 49'; Gabelia 60'	Report	Duggan 66'	Stadium: BIIK Stadium; Attendance: 2,800; Referee: Zuzana Valentová (Slovakia)

26 September 2018 Second Leg	Barcelona (Spain)	3–0	(Kazakhstan) BIIK Kazygurt	Barcelona
18:00 GMT	Guijarro 4'; Torrejón 48'; Martens 90'	Report		Stadium: Mini Estadi; Attendance: 1,667; Referee: Justina Lavrenovaitė (Lithuania)

Barcelona won 4–3 on aggregate.

==== Round of 16 ====
17 October 2018 First Leg	Barcelona (Spain)	5–0	(Scotland) Glasgow City	Barcelona
18:30 GMT	Hamraoui 12'; Bonmatí 38'; Guijarro 41'; Alves 68'; León 81'	Report		Stadium: Mini Estadi; Attendance: 1,639; Referee: Ivana Martinčić (Croatia)

1 November 2018 Second Leg	Glasgow City (Scotland)	0-3	(Spain) Barcelona	Glasgow
20:30 (19:30 GMT)		Report	Duggan 13', 51'; Putellas 48'	Stadium: Petershill Park; Attendance: 795; Referee: Désirée Grundbacher (Switzerland)

Barcelona won 8–0 on aggregate.

==== Quarterfinals ====
20 March 2019 First Leg	Barcelona (Spain)	3–0	(Norway) LSK Kvinner	Barcelona
19:00	Duggan 3', 24'; Caldentey 36' (pen.)	Report		Stadium: Mini Estadi; Attendance: 5,563; Referee: Riem Hussein (Germany)

27 March 2019 Second Leg	LSK Kvinner (Norway)	0-1	(Spain) Barcelona	Lillestrøm
18:30		Report	Martens 7'	Stadium: Åråsen Stadion; Attendance: 5,655; Referee: Stéphanie Frappart (France)

Barcelona won 4–0 on aggregate.

==== Semifinals ====
21 April 2019 First Leg	Bayern Munich (Germany)	0-1	(Spain) Barcelona	Munich
18:00		Report	Hamraoui 63'	Stadium: FC Bayern Campus; Attendance: 2,500; Referee: Jana Adámková (Czech Republic)

28 April 2019 Second Leg	Barcelona (Spain)	1-0	(Germany) Bayern Munich	Barcelona
12:00	Caldentey 45+2' (pen.)	Report		Stadium: Mini Estadi; Attendance: 12,764; Referee: Esther Staubli (Switzerland)

Barcelona won 2–0 on aggregate.

==== Final ====
18 May 2019 2019 UEFA Women's Champions League Final	Lyon (France)	4-1	(Spain) Barcelona	Budapest
18:00 UTC+2	Marozsán 5'; Hegerberg 14', 19', 30'	Report	Oshoala 89'	Stadium: Groupama Arena; Attendance: 19,487; Referee: Anastasia Pustovoitova (Russia)

=== Copa de la Reina ===
25 November 2018 Round of 16	Barcelona	2–0	Espanyol	Barcelona
15:00	Putellas 15'; Duggan 29'	Report		Stadium: Mini Estadi; Attendance: 1,076; Referee: María Dolores Martínez Madrona

30 January 2019 Quarterfinals	Madrid CFF	0–3	Barcelona	San Sebastián de los Reyes
20:00		Report	Martens 12'; Torrejón 52'; Hamraoui 54'	Stadium: Matapiñonera; Referee: Gallastegui Pérez

17 February 2019 Semifinals	Atlético Madrid	2–0	Barcelona	Majadahonda
11:00	Ludmila 43', 62'	Report		Stadium: Cerro del Espino; Attendance: 3,125; Referee: Marta Huerta de Aza

=== Copa Catalunya ===
23 August 2018 Semifinal	Barcelona	9–0	CF Pardinyes	Tàrrega
	Alves 14', 24' (pen.); Carla 25'; Andonova 51', 53', 63'; Mariona 73', 86', 90'	Report		Stadium: Municipal Joan Capdevila; Attendance: 900; Referee: Petrova Borislavova

25 August 2018 Final	Barcelona	7–0	Espanyol	Tàrrega
20:00	Andonova 12', 29'; Duggan 15', 78'; Hamraoui 25', 61'; Latorre 87'	Report		Stadium: Municipal Joan Capdevila; Attendance: 1,200; Referee: Acevedo Dudley

== Squad ==
=== First team ===
Note: Flags indicate national team as defined under FIFA eligibility rules. Players may hold more than one non-FIFA nationality.

No.	Pos.	Nat.	Name	Age	Since	App.	Goals
Goalkeepers
1	GK	(Spain)	Sandra Paños (third captain)	26	2015	135	0
13	GK	(Mexico)	Pamela Tajonar		2018	3	0
Defenders
5	DF	(Spain)	Melanie Serrano	29	2003		
8	DF	(Spain)	Marta Torrejón (vice-captain)	29	2013	233	26
15	DF	(Spain)	Leila Ouahabi		2011		
4	DF	(Spain)	Mapi León		2017	79	4
17	DF	(Spain)	Andrea Pereira		2018	33	0
3	DF	(Netherlands)	Stefanie van der Gragt		2018	10	1
Midfielders
6	MF	(Spain)	Vicky Losada (captain)		2006		
7	MF	(Spain)	Gemma Gili	24	2012		
11	MF	(Spain)	Alexia Putellas (fourth captain)	25	2012		
12	MF	(Spain)	Patricia Guijarro	21	2015	116	28
14	MF	(Spain)	Aitana Bonmatí	21	2016	80	19
20	MF	(France)	Élise Bussaglia		2017	35	3
18	MF	(France)	Kheira Hamraoui		2018	34	4
Forwards
9	FW	(Spain)	Mariona Caldentey	23	2014	123	45
19	FW	(Spain)	Bárbara Latorre	26	2015	113	38
10	FW	(Brazil)	Andressa Alves		2016	91	22
21	FW	(North Macedonia)	Nataša Andonova		2017	58	8
16	FW	(England)	Toni Duggan		2017	72	29
22	FW	(Netherlands)	Lieke Martens		2017	69	28
23	FW	(Spain)	Candela Andújar		2017	23	2
20	FW	(Nigeria)	Asisat Oshoala		2019	11	8

- Source: FCBarcelona.com
- Ordered by arrival.

=== Reserve team ===
Players from the B team eligible to train and play with the main squad.

Note: Flags indicate national team as defined under FIFA eligibility rules; some limited exceptions apply. Players may hold more than one non-FIFA nationality.

No.	Pos.	Nation	Player
24	FW	(Spain) ESP	Clàudia Pina
25	GK	(Spain) ESP	Gemma Font
26	DF	(Spain) ESP	Jana Fernández
27	DF	(Spain) ESP	Laia Codina
28	FW	(Spain) ESP	Carla Armengol
29	MF	(Spain) ESP	Paula Gutiérrez

=== Squad appearances and goals ===
As of 15 May 2019

No.	Pos.	Nat.	Player	Total			Primera División			Champions League			Copa de la Reina						
No.	Pos.	Nat.	Player	Games		Goals	Games		Goals	Games		Goals	Games		Goals				
No.	Pos.	Nat.	Player	Pl.	St.	Goals	Pl.	St.	Goals	Pl.	St.	Goals	Pl.	St.	Goals				
1	GK	(Spain)	Sandra Paños	39	39	Goals	0	27	Goals	27	0	Goals	9	9	Goals	0	3	3	0
3	DF	(Netherlands)	Stephanie van der Gragt	10	8	1	7	6	1	1	0	0	2	2	0				
4	DF	(Spain)	María León	42	41	2	30	29	1	9	9	1	3	3	0				
5	DF	(Spain)	Melanie Serrano	22	21	0	16	15	0	4	4	0	2	2	0				
6	MF	(Spain)	Vicky Losada	34	31	2	26	23	2	7	7	0	1	1	0				
7	MF	(Spain)	Gema Gili	11	4	0	7	1	0	3	2	0	1	1	0				
8	DF	(Spain)	Marta Torrejón	39	38	8	29	29	6	7	7	1	3	2	1				
9	FW	(Spain)	Mariona Caldentey	28	24	11	20	16	9	7	7	2	1	1	0				
10	FW	(Brazil)	Andressa Alves	36	16	7	26	10	6	8	4	1	2	2	0				
11	MF	(Spain)	Alexia Putellas	39	31	18	28	22	16	8	7	1	3	2	1				
12	MF	(Spain)	Patri Guijarro	18	16	6	14	12	4	3	3	2	1	1	0				
13	GK	(Mexico)	Pamela Tajonar	3	3	0	3	3	0	0	0	0	0	0	0				
14	MF	(Spain)	Aitana Bonmatí	37	25	13	27	20	12	7	2	1	3	3	0				
15	DF	(Spain)	Leila Ouahabi	30	21	0	21	15	0	6	5	0	3	1	0				
16	FW	(England)	Toni Duggan	37	28	15	25	18	9	9	8	5	3	2	1				
17	DF	(Spain)	Andrea Pereira	33	33	0	23	23	0	9	9	0	1	1	0				
18	MF	(France)	Kheira Hamraoui	34	31	4	24	22	1	7	6	2	3	3	1				
19	FW	(Spain)	Bárbara Latorre	15	3	0	12	2	0	2	1	0	1	0	0				
20	FW	(Nigeria)	Asisat Oshoala	11	5	8	7	5	7	3	0	1	1	0	0				
20	MF	(France)	Élise Bussaglia	3	1	0	1	0	0	2	1	0	0	0	0				
21	FW	(North Macedonia)	Nataša Andonova	30	8	2	23	5	2	6	2	0	1	1	0				
22	FW	(Netherlands)	Lieke Martens	31	30	14	23	22	11	6	6	2	2	2	1				
23	FW	(Spain)	Candela Andújar	21	4	2	17	4	2	1	0	0	3	0	0				
24	FW	(Spain)	Clàudia Pina	12	1	2	10	1	2	1	0	0	1	0	0				
25	GK	(Spain)	Gemma Font	0	0	0	0	0	0	0	0	0	0	0	0				
26	DF	(Spain)	Jana Fernández	1	0	0	1	0	0	0	0	0	0	0	0				
27	DF	(Spain)	Laia Codina	1	0	0	0	0	0	1	0	0	0	0	0				
28	FW	(Spain)	Carla Armengol	1	0	0	0	0	0	1	0	0	0	0	0				
29	MF	(Spain)	Paula Gutiérrez	0	0	0	0	0	0	0	0	0	0	0	0				

=== Transfers ===
==== Transfers in ====
Date from	Position	Player	Age	From	Type	Ref.
June 4, 2018	DF	(Netherlands) Stefanie van der Gragt	25	(Netherlands) AFC Ajax	Transfer	
June 19, 2018	MF	(France) Kheira Hamraoui	28	(France) Lyon	Transfer	
June 19, 2018	GK	(Mexico) Pamela Tajonar	33	(Spain) Sevilla	Transfer	
January 31, 2019	FW	(Nigeria) Asisat Oshoala	25	(China) Dalian Quanjian	Loan	

==== Transfers out ====
Date from	Position	Player	Age	To	Type	Ref.
June 6, 2018	GK	(Spain) Andrea Giménez	20	—	Retirement	
June 12, 2018	DF	(Spain) Ruth García	31	(Spain) Levante	Transfer	
June 30, 2018	GK	(Spain) Laura Ràfols	25	—	Retirement	
June 30, 2018	DF	(Denmark) Line Røddik Hansen	30	(Denmark) FC Nordsjælland	Transfer	
June 30, 2018	DF	(France) Perle Morroni	20	(France) PSG	Loan end	
July 2, 2018	FW	(Spain) Olga García	25	(Spain) Atletico Madrid	Transfer	
July 24, 2018	DF	(Spain) Marta Unzué	30	(Spain) Athletic Club	Loan	
December 31, 2018	MF	(France) Élise Bussaglia	33	(France) Dijon	Transfer	
