= 2018–19 in Spanish football =

Football in Spain
- Season: 2018–19

Men's football
- La Liga: Barcelona
- Segunda División: Osasuna
- Segunda División B: Fuenlabrada
- Copa del Rey: Valencia
- Copa Federación: Mirandés
- Supercopa: Barcelona

Women's football
- Primera División: Atlético Madrid
- Copa de la Reina: Real Sociedad

The 2018–19 season was the 117th season of competitive association football in Spain.

== Promotion and relegation ==
=== Pre-season ===
League	Promoted to league	Relegated from league
La Liga	Huesca; Rayo Vallecano; Real Valladolid	Málaga; Las Palmas; Deportivo La Coruña
Segunda División	Mallorca; Rayo Majadahonda; Elche; Extremadura	Cultural Leonesa; Barcelona B; Sevilla Atlético; Lorca FC (Note: Lorca was relegated to Tercera División due to financial troubles.)
Segunda División B	Almería B; Atlético Levante; Atlético Malagueño; Atlético Sanluqueño; Calahorra; Castellón; Conquense; Cultural Durango; Don Benito; Ejea; Espanyol B; Gimnástica Torrelavega; Ibiza (Note: Ibiza was promoted from Tercera División to replace Lorca FC.); Internacional; Langreo; Oviedo B; Salamanca CF; Teruel; Unionistas	Betis Deportivo; Caudal; Cerceda (Note: Cerceda was relegated to Preferente Autonómica due to financial troubles.); Córdoba B; Deportivo Aragón; Écija; Formentera; Gimnástica Segoviana; Lealtad; Lorca Deportiva; Llagostera; Mérida; Osasuna B; Peña Deportiva; Peña Sport; Racing de Ferrol; Saguntino; Toledo
Primera División (women)	Logroño; Málaga	Santa Teresa; Zaragoza CFF

== National teams ==
=== Spain national football team ===
==== Friendly matches ====
11 October 2018	Wales	1–4	Spain	Cardiff, Wales
20:45 (19:45 UTC+1)	Vokes 89'	Report	Alcácer 8', 29'; Ramos 19'; Bartra 74'	Stadium: Millennium Stadium; Attendance: 50,232; Referee: Anthony Taylor (England)

18 November 2018	Spain	1–0	Bosnia and Herzegovina	Las Palmas, Spain
20:45 (19:45 UTC±0)	Méndez 78'	Report		Stadium: Estadio Gran Canaria; Attendance: 25,000; Referee: Carlos Xistra (Portugal)

==== 2018 FIFA World Cup ====
===== Group B =====
Pos	Team	Pld	W	D	L	GF	GA	GD	Pts	Qualification
1	Spain	3	1	2	0	6	5	+1	5	Advance to knockout stage
2	Portugal	3	1	2	0	5	4	+1	5	Advance to knockout stage
3	Iran	3	1	1	1	2	2	0	4	
4	Morocco	3	0	1	2	2	4	−2	1	

Source: FIFA
Rules for classification: Group stage tiebreakers
15 June 2018
21:00 MSK (UTC+3)

Portugal	3–3	Spain
Ronaldo 4' (pen.), 44', 88'		Costa 24', 55'; Nacho 58'

Fisht Olympic Stadium, Sochi
Attendance: 43,866
Referee: Gianluca Rocchi (Italy)

20 June 2018
21:00 MSK (UTC+3)

Iran	0–1	Spain
		Costa 54'

Kazan Arena, Kazan
Attendance: 42,718
Referee: Andrés Cunha (Uruguay)

25 June 2018
20:00 KALT (UTC+2)

Spain	2–2	Morocco
Isco 19'; Aspas 90+1'		Boutaïb 14'; En-Nesyri 81'

Kaliningrad Stadium, Kaliningrad
Attendance: 33,973
Referee: Ravshan Irmatov (Uzbekistan)

===== Round of 16 =====
1 July 2018
17:00 MSK (UTC+3)

Spain	1–1 (a.e.t.)	Russia
Ignashevich 12' (o.g.)		Dzyuba 41' (pen.)
Penalties
Iniesta (penalty scored); Piqué (penalty scored); Koke (penalty missed); Ramos (penalty scored); Aspas (penalty missed)	3–4	(penalty scored) Smolov; (penalty scored) Ignashevich; (penalty scored) Golovin; (penalty scored) Cheryshev

Luzhniki Stadium, Moscow
Attendance: 78,011
Referee: Björn Kuipers (Netherlands)

==== 2018–19 UEFA Nations League A ====
===== Group 4 =====
Pos	Team	Pld	W	D	L	GF	GA	GD	Pts	Qualification (Note: Due to revamp of the format for the 2020–21 UEFA Nations League, no teams were eventually relegated.)	(England)	(Spain)	(Croatia)
1	England	4	2	1	1	6	5	+1	7	Qualification for Nations League Finals	—	1–2	2–1
2	Spain	4	2	0	2	12	7	+5	6		2–3	—	6–0
3	Croatia	4	1	1	2	4	10	−6	4		0–0	3–2	—

Source: UEFA
Rules for classification: Tiebreakers

==== UEFA Euro 2020 qualifying ====
===== Group F =====
Pos	Team	Pld	W	D	L	GF	GA	GD	Pts	Qualification	(Spain)	(Sweden)	(Norway)	(Romania)	(Faroe Islands)	(Malta)
1	Spain	10	8	2	0	31	5	+26	26	Qualify for final tournament	—	3–0	2–1	5–0	4–0	7–0
2	Sweden	10	6	3	1	23	9	+14	21	Qualify for final tournament	1–1	—	1–1	2–1	3–0	3–0
3	Norway	10	4	5	1	19	11	+8	17	Advance to play-offs via Nations League	1–1	3–3	—	2–2	4–0	2–0
4	Romania	10	4	2	4	17	15	+2	14	Advance to play-offs via Nations League	1–2	0–2	1–1	—	4–1	1–0
5	Faroe Islands	10	1	0	9	4	30	−26	3 (Note: Tied on head-to-head points (3) and head-to-head goal difference (0). Head-to-head away goals: Faroe Islands 1, Malta 0.)		1–4	0–4	0–2	0–3	—	1–0
6	Malta	10	1	0	9	3	27	−24	3		0–2	0–4	1–2	0–4	2–1	—

Source: UEFA
Rules for classification: Qualification tiebreakers
Notes:

23 March 2019	Spain	2–1	Norway	Valencia, Spain
20:45 (UTC+1)	Rodrigo 16'; Ramos 71' (pen.)	Report	King 65' (pen.)	Stadium: Mestalla; Referee: Andris Treimanis (Latvia)

26 March 2019	Malta	0–2	Spain	Ta' Qali, Malta
20:45 (UTC+1)		Report	Morata 31', 73'	Stadium: National Stadium; Referee: Andrew Dallas (Scotland)

7 June 2019	Faroe Islands	1–4	Spain	Tórshavn, Faroe Islands
20:45 (19:45 UTC+1)	K. Olsen 30'	Report	Ramos 6'; Navas 19'; Gestsson 34' (o.g.); Gayà 71'	Stadium: Tórsvøllur; Referee: Enea Jorgji (Albania)

10 June 2019	Spain	3–0	Sweden	Madrid, Spain
20:45	Ramos 64' (pen.); Morata 85' (pen.); Oyarzabal 87'	Report		Stadium: Santiago Bernabéu; Referee: William Collum (Scotland)

=== Spain women's national football team ===
==== Friendly matches ====
8 November 2018	Spain	3–1	Poland	(Spain) Leganés
	Falcón 5'; Putellas 58'; Carro 79'		Pajor 39'	Stadium: Butarque; Attendance: 3,491; Referee: (Spain) María Dolores Martínez

13 November 2018	Germany	0–0	Spain	(Germany) Erfurt
16:00 (16:00 UTC+1)				Stadium: Steigerwaldstadion; Attendance: 3,169; Referee: (Sweden) Tess Olofsson

17 January 2019	Spain	1–1	Belgium	(Spain) Cartagena
19:00	Redondo 64'	Report	Cayman 88'	Stadium: Estadio Cartagonova; Attendance: 3,300; Referee: (Portugal) Sandra Braz

22 January 2019	Spain	0–1	United States	(Spain) Alicante
20:35		Report	Press 54'	Stadium: José Rico Pérez; Attendance: 9,182; Referee: (France) Stéphanie Frappart

5 April 2019	Spain	2–1	Brazil	(Spain) Don Benito
18:30	Putellas 63'; Torrecilla 68'	Report	Marta 21'	Stadium: Estadio Vicente Sanz; Referee: (Spain) Zulema González

9 April 2019	England	2–1	Spain	(England) Swindon
19:00	Mead 36'; White 46'	Report	Bonmatí 67'	Stadium: County Ground; Attendance: 11,000; Referee: (France) Stephanie Frappart

17 May 2019	Spain	4–0	Cameroon	(Spain) Guadalajara
18:45	Guerrero 31'; Redondo 54'; Hernández 76'; Aleixandri 87'	Report		Stadium: Pedro Escartín; Referee: (Spain) Marta Huerta

24 May 2019	Spain	0–0	Canada	(Spain) Logroño
19:00		Report		Stadium: Las Gaunas; Attendance: 4,389; Referee: (Netherlands) Lizzy van der Helm

2 June 2019	Spain	1–1	Japan	(France) Le Touquet
13:50	Hermoso 22' (pen.)		Sugasawa 85'	Stadium: Stade Gérard Houllier; Referee: (France) Mehdi Mokhtari

==== 2019 FIFA Women's World Cup qualification (UEFA) ====
===== Group 7 =====
Pos	Team	Pld	W	D	L	GF	GA	GD	Pts	Qualification	Spain	Austria	Finland	Serbia	Israel
1	Spain	8	8	0	0	25	2	+23	24	2019 FIFA Women's World Cup	—	4–0	5–1	3–0	2–0
2	Austria	8	5	1	2	19	7	+12	16		0–1	—	4–1	1–1	2–0
3	Finland	8	3	1	4	9	13	−4	10		0–2	0–2	—	1–0	4–0
4	Serbia	8	2	1	5	5	13	−8	7		1–2	0–4	0–2	—	2–0
5	Israel	8	0	1	7	0	23	−23	1		0–6	0–6	0–0	0–1	—

Source: UEFA

==== Algarve Cup ====
===== Group B =====
Pos	Team	Pld	W	D	L	GF	GA	GD	Pts
1	Poland	2	2	0	0	4	0	+4	6
2	Spain	2	1	0	1	2	3	−1	3
3	Netherlands	2	0	0	2	0	3	−3	0

Source: FPT
Rules for classification: Tiebreakers

27 February 2019 Group B	Spain	2–0	Netherlands	Parchal, Portugal
	Hermoso 20', 62'			Stadium: Bela Vista Municipal Stadium

1 March 2019 Group B	Poland	3–0	Spain	Lagos, Portugal
				Stadium: Lagos Municipal Stadium

===== 7th Place =====
6 March 2019	Switzerland	0–2	Spain	Albufeira, Portugal
			Hermoso 21'; Ismaili 63' (o.g.)	Stadium: Albufeira Municipal Stadium; Referee: María Belén Carvajal (Chile)

==== 2019 FIFA Women's World Cup ====
===== Group B =====
Pos	Team	Pld	W	D	L	GF	GA	GD	Pts	Qualification
1	Germany	3	3	0	0	6	0	+6	9	Advance to knockout stage
2	Spain	3	1	1	1	3	2	+1	4	Advance to knockout stage
3	China	3	1	1	1	1	1	0	4	Advance to knockout stage
4	South Africa	3	0	0	3	1	8	−7	0	

Source: FIFA
Rules for classification: Group stage tiebreakers

8 June 2019 Group B	Spain	3–1	South Africa	Le Havre, France
18:00	Hermoso 69' (pen.), 82' (pen.); L. García 89'	Report	Kgatlana 25'	Stadium: Stade Océane; Attendance: 12,044; Referee: María Carvajal (Chile)

12 June 2019 Group B	Germany	1–0	Spain	Valenciennes, France
18:00	Däbritz 42'	Report		Stadium: Stade du Hainaut; Attendance: 20,761; Referee: Kateryna Monzul (Ukraine)

17 June 2019 Group B	China	0–0	Spain	Le Havre, France
18:00		Report		Stadium: Stade Océane; Attendance: 11,814; Referee: Edina Alves Batista (Brazil)

===== Knockout stage =====
24 June 2019 Round of 16	Spain	1–2	United States	Reims, France
18:00	Hermoso 9'	Report	Rapinoe 7' (pen.), 76' (pen.)	Stadium: Stade Auguste-Delaune; Attendance: 19,633; Referee: Katalin Kulcsár (Hungary)

== FIFA competitions ==
=== 2018 FIFA Club World Cup ===
==== Semi-finals ====
19 December 2018
20:30

Kashima Antlers (Japan)	1–3	(Spain) Real Madrid
Doi 78'	Report	Bale 44', 53', 55'

Zayed Sports City Stadium, Abu Dhabi
Attendance: 30,554
Referee: Wilton Sampaio (Brazil)

==== Final ====
22 December 2018
20:30

Real Madrid (Spain)	4–1	(United Arab Emirates) Al Ain
Modrić 14'; Llorente 60'; Ramos 79'; Nader 90+1' (o.g.)	Report	Shiotani 86'

Zayed Sports City Stadium, Abu Dhabi
Attendance: 40,696
Referee: Jair Marrufo (United States)

== UEFA competitions ==
=== 2018–19 UEFA Champions League ===
==== Group stage ====
===== Group A =====
Pos	Team	Pld	W	D	L	GF	GA	GD	Pts	Qualification	DOR	ATM	BRU	MON
1	(Germany) Borussia Dortmund	6	4	1	1	10	2	+8	13 (Note: Head-to-head goal difference: Borussia Dortmund +2, Atlético Madrid –2.)	Advance to knockout phase	—	4–0	0–0	3–0
2	(Spain) Atlético Madrid	6	4	1	1	9	6	+3	13	Advance to knockout phase	2–0	—	3–1	2–0
3	(Belgium) Club Brugge	6	1	3	2	6	5	+1	6	Transfer to Europa League	0–1	0–0	—	1–1
4	(France) Monaco	6	0	1	5	2	14	−12	1		0–2	1–2	0–4	—

Source: UEFA

===== Group B =====
Pos	Team	Pld	W	D	L	GF	GA	GD	Pts	Qualification	BAR	TOT	INT	PSV
1	(Spain) Barcelona	6	4	2	0	14	5	+9	14	Advance to knockout phase	—	1–1	2–0	4–0
2	(England) Tottenham Hotspur	6	2	2	2	9	10	−1	8 (Note: Head-to-head away goals: Tottenham Hotspur 1, Inter Milan 0.)	Advance to knockout phase	2–4	—	1–0	2–1
3	(Italy) Inter Milan	6	2	2	2	6	7	−1	8	Transfer to Europa League	1–1	2–1	—	1–1
4	(Netherlands) PSV Eindhoven	6	0	2	4	6	13	−7	2		1–2	2–2	1–2	—

Source: UEFA

===== Group G =====
Pos	Team	Pld	W	D	L	GF	GA	GD	Pts	Qualification	RMA	ROM	PLZ	CSKA
1	(Spain) Real Madrid	6	4	0	2	12	5	+7	12	Advance to knockout phase	—	3–0	2–1	0–3
2	(Italy) Roma	6	3	0	3	11	8	+3	9	Advance to knockout phase	0–2	—	5–0	3–0
3	(Czech Republic) Viktoria Plzeň	6	2	1	3	7	16	−9	7 (Note: Head-to-head points: Viktoria Plzeň 4, CSKA Moscow 1.)	Transfer to Europa League	0–5	2–1	—	2–2
4	(Russia) CSKA Moscow	6	2	1	3	8	9	−1	7		1–0	1–2	1–2	—

Source: UEFA

===== Group H =====
Pos	Team	Pld	W	D	L	GF	GA	GD	Pts	Qualification	JUV	MUN	VAL	YB
1	(Italy) Juventus	6	4	0	2	9	4	+5	12	Advance to knockout phase	—	1–2	1–0	3–0
2	(England) Manchester United	6	3	1	2	7	4	+3	10	Advance to knockout phase	0–1	—	0–0	1–0
3	(Spain) Valencia	6	2	2	2	6	6	0	8	Transfer to Europa League	0–2	2–1	—	3–1
4	(Switzerland) Young Boys	6	1	1	4	4	12	−8	4		2–1	0–3	1–1	—

Source: UEFA

==== Knockout phase ====
===== Round of 16 =====
Team 1	Agg.	Team 2	1st leg	2nd leg
Atlético Madrid (Spain)	2–3	(Italy) Juventus	2–0	0–3
Lyon (France)	1–5	(Spain) Barcelona	0–0	1–5
Ajax (Netherlands)	5–3	(Spain) Real Madrid	1–2	4–1

===== Quarter-finals =====
Team 1	Agg.	Team 2	1st leg	2nd leg
Manchester United (England)	0–4 (Note: Order of legs reversed after original draw, in order to avoid a scheduling conflict with the Manchester City v Tottenham Hotspur match in the same city.)	(Spain) Barcelona	0–1	0–3

===== Semi-finals =====
Team 1	Agg.	Team 2	1st leg	2nd leg
Barcelona (Spain)	3–4	(England) Liverpool	3–0	0–4

=== 2018–19 UEFA Europa League ===
==== Qualifying phase and play-off round ====
===== Second qualifying round =====
Team 1	Agg.	Team 2	1st leg	2nd leg
Sevilla (Spain)	7–1	(Hungary) Újpest	4–0	3–1

===== Third qualifying round =====
Team 1	Agg.	Team 2	1st leg	2nd leg
Sevilla (Spain)	6–0	(Lithuania) Žalgiris	1–0	5–0

===== Play-off round =====
Team 1	Agg.	Team 2	1st leg	2nd leg
Sigma Olomouc (Czech Republic)	0–4	(Spain) Sevilla	0–1	0–3

==== Group stage ====
===== Group F =====
Pos	Team	Pld	W	D	L	GF	GA	GD	Pts	Qualification	BET	OLY	MIL	DUD
1	(Spain) Real Betis	6	3	3	0	7	2	+5	12	Advance to knockout phase	—	1–0	1–1	3–0
2	(Greece) Olympiacos	6	3	1	2	11	6	+5	10 (Note: Goal difference in all group matches: Olympiacos +5, Milan +3.)	Advance to knockout phase	0–0	—	3–1	5–1
3	(Italy) Milan	6	3	1	2	12	9	+3	10		1–2	3–1	—	5–2
4	(Luxembourg) F91 Dudelange	6	0	1	5	3	16	−13	1		0–0	0–2	0–1	—

Source: UEFA
Rules for classification: Group stage tiebreakers

===== Group G =====
Pos	Team	Pld	W	D	L	GF	GA	GD	Pts	Qualification	VIL	RW	RAN	SPM
1	(Spain) Villarreal	6	2	4	0	12	5	+7	10 (Note: Head-to-head points: Villarreal 4, Rapid Wien 1.)	Advance to knockout phase	—	5–0	2–2	2–0
2	(Austria) Rapid Wien	6	3	1	2	6	9	−3	10	Advance to knockout phase	0–0	—	1–0	2–0
3	(Scotland) Rangers	6	1	3	2	8	8	0	6		0–0	3–1	—	0–0
4	(Russia) Spartak Moscow	6	1	2	3	8	12	−4	5		3–3	1–2	4–3	—

Source: UEFA
Rules for classification: Group stage tiebreakers

===== Group J =====
Pos	Team	Pld	W	D	L	GF	GA	GD	Pts	Qualification	SEV	KRA	STL	AKH
1	(Spain) Sevilla	6	4	0	2	18	6	+12	12 (Note: Head-to-head goal difference: Sevilla +2, Krasnodar –2.)	Advance to knockout phase	—	3–0	5–1	6–0
2	(Russia) Krasnodar	6	4	0	2	8	8	0	12	Advance to knockout phase	2–1	—	2–1	2–1
3	(Belgium) Standard Liège	6	3	1	2	7	9	−2	10		1–0	2–1	—	2–1
4	(Turkey) Akhisarspor	6	0	1	5	4	14	−10	1		2–3	0–1	0–0	—

Source: UEFA
Rules for classification: Group stage tiebreakers

===== Round of 32 =====
Team 1	Agg.	Team 2	1st leg	2nd leg
Celtic (Scotland)	0–3	(Spain) Valencia	0–2	0–1
Rennes (France)	6–4	(Spain) Real Betis	3–3	3–1
Lazio (Italy)	0–3	(Spain) Sevilla	0–1	0–2
Sporting CP (Portugal)	1–2	(Spain) Villarreal	0–1	1–1

==== Knockout phase ====
===== Round of 16 =====
Team 1	Agg.	Team 2	1st leg	2nd leg
Valencia (Spain)	3–2	(Russia) Krasnodar	2–1	1–1
Sevilla (Spain)	5–6	(Czech Republic) Slavia Prague	2–2	3–4 (a.e.t.)
Zenit Saint Petersburg (Russia)	2–5	(Spain) Villarreal	1–3	1–2

===== Quarter-finals =====
Team 1	Agg.	Team 2	1st leg	2nd leg
Villarreal (Spain)	1–5	(Spain) Valencia	1–3	0–2

===== Semi-finals =====
Team 1	Agg.	Team 2	1st leg	2nd leg
Arsenal (England)	7–3	(Spain) Valencia	3–1	4–2

=== 2018 UEFA Super Cup ===
15 August 2018
22:00 UTC+3

Real Madrid (Spain)	2–4 (a.e.t.)	(Spain) Atlético Madrid
Benzema 27'; Ramos 63' (pen.)	Report	Costa 1', 79'; Saúl 98'; Koke 104'

Lilleküla Stadium, Tallinn
Attendance: 12,424
Referee: Szymon Marciniak (Poland)

=== 2018–19 UEFA Youth League ===
==== UEFA Champions League Path ====
===== Group A =====
Pos	Team	Pld	W	D	L	GF	GA	GD	Pts	Qualification	ATM	MON	BRU	DOR
1	(Spain) Atlético Madrid	6	4	0	2	15	8	+7	12	Round of 16	—	3–0	1–2	4–0
2	(France) Monaco	6	3	1	2	9	9	0	10	Play-offs	0–2	—	3–1	1–1
3	(Belgium) Club Brugge	6	2	1	3	10	11	−1	7		3–1	2–3	—	1–1
4	(Germany) Borussia Dortmund	6	1	2	3	7	13	−6	5		3–4	0–2	2–1	—

Source: UEFA

===== Group B =====
Pos	Team	Pld	W	D	L	GF	GA	GD	Pts	Qualification	BAR	TOT	INT	PSV
1	(Spain) Barcelona	6	3	2	1	8	6	+2	11	Round of 16	—	0–2	2–1	2–1
2	(England) Tottenham Hotspur	6	2	3	1	10	8	+2	9	Play-offs	1–1	—	2–4	2–0
3	(Italy) Inter Milan	6	2	1	3	10	9	+1	7		0–2	1–1	—	3–0
4	(Netherlands) PSV Eindhoven	6	1	2	3	6	11	−5	5		1–1	2–2	2–1	—

Source: UEFA

===== Group G =====
Pos	Team	Pld	W	D	L	GF	GA	GD	Pts	Qualification	RMA	ROM	PLZ	CSKA
1	(Spain) Real Madrid	6	6	0	0	20	7	+13	18	Round of 16	—	3–1	3–2	2–1
2	(Italy) Roma	6	3	0	3	14	17	−3	9	Play-offs	1–6	—	3–4	3–1
3	(Czech Republic) Viktoria Plzeň	6	1	2	3	11	14	−3	5		1–2	2–4	—	1–1
4	(Russia) CSKA Moscow	6	0	2	4	6	13	−7	2		1–4	1–2	1–1	—

Source: UEFA

===== Group H =====
Pos	Team	Pld	W	D	L	GF	GA	GD	Pts	Qualification	MUN	JUV	YB	VAL
1	(England) Manchester United	6	5	1	0	20	7	+13	16	Round of 16	—	4–1	6–2	4–0
2	(Italy) Juventus	6	3	1	2	11	11	0	10	Play-offs	2–2	—	2–1	3–0
3	(Switzerland) Young Boys	6	2	1	3	12	15	−3	7		1–2	4–2	—	3–3
4	(Spain) Valencia	6	0	1	5	4	14	−10	1		1–2	0–1	0–1	—

Source: UEFA

==== Knockout phase ====
===== Round of 16 =====
Team 1	Score	Team 2
Barcelona (Spain)	3–0	(Germany) Hertha BSC
Atlético Madrid (Spain)	1–2	(Spain) Real Madrid

===== Quarter-finals =====
Team 1	Score	Team 2
Barcelona (Spain)	3–2	(France) Lyon
1899 Hoffenheim (Germany)	4–2	(Spain) Real Madrid

===== Semi-finals =====
Team 1	Score	Team 2
Barcelona (Spain)	2–2 (4–5 p)	(England) Chelsea

=== 2018–19 UEFA Women's Champions League ===
==== Knockout phase ====
===== Round of 32 =====
Team 1	Agg.	Team 2	1st leg	2nd leg
Atlético Madrid (Spain)	3–1	(England) Manchester City	1–1	2–0
BIIK Kazygurt (Kazakhstan)	3–4	(Spain) Barcelona	3–1	0–3

===== Round of 16 =====
Team 1	Agg.	Team 2	1st leg	2nd leg
VfL Wolfsburg (Germany)	10–0	(Spain) Atlético Madrid	4–0	6–0
Barcelona (Spain)	8–0	(Scotland) Glasgow City	5–0	3–0

===== Quarter-finals =====
Team 1	Agg.	Team 2	1st leg	2nd leg
Barcelona (Spain)	4–0	(Norway) LSK Kvinner	3–0	1–0

===== Semi-finals =====
Team 1	Agg.	Team 2	1st leg	2nd leg
Bayern Munich (Germany)	0–2	(Spain) Barcelona	0–1	0–1

===== Final =====
The final was played on 18 May 2019 at the Groupama Arena in Budapest. The "home" team for the final (for administrative purposes) was determined by an additional draw held after the quarter-final and semi-final draws.

18 May 2019
18:00 UTC+2

Lyon (France)	4–1	(Spain) Barcelona
Marozsán 5'; Hegerberg 14', 19', 30'	Report	Oshoala 89'

Groupama Arena, Budapest
Attendance: 19,487
Referee: Anastasia Pustovoitova (Russia)

== Men's football ==
=== League season ===
==== La Liga ====
Pos	Team	Pld	W	D	L	GF	GA	GD	Pts	Qualification or relegation
1	Barcelona (C)	38	26	9	3	90	36	+54	87	Qualification for the Champions League group stage
2	Atlético Madrid	38	22	10	6	55	29	+26	76	Qualification for the Champions League group stage
3	Real Madrid	38	21	5	12	63	46	+17	68	Qualification for the Champions League group stage
4	Valencia	38	15	16	7	51	35	+16	61	Qualification for the Champions League group stage
5	Getafe	38	15	14	9	48	35	+13	59 (Note: Getafe finished ahead of Sevilla on head-to-head points: Sevilla 0–2 Getafe, Getafe 3–0 Sevilla.)	Qualification for the Europa League group stage (Note: Since the winners of the 2018–19 Copa del Rey, Valencia, qualified for European competition based on league position, the spot awarded to the cup winners (Europa League group stage) was passed to the sixth-placed team and the spot awarded to the sixth-placed team (Europa League second qualifying round) was passed to the seventh-placed team.)
6	Sevilla	38	17	8	13	62	47	+15	59	Qualification for the Europa League group stage
7	Espanyol	38	14	11	13	48	50	−2	53 (Note: Espanyol finished ahead of Athletic Bilbao on head-to-head points: Espanyol 1–0 Athletic Bilbao, Athletic Bilbao 1–1 Espanyol.)	Qualification for the Europa League second qualifying round
8	Athletic Bilbao	38	13	14	11	41	45	−4	53	
9	Real Sociedad	38	13	11	14	45	46	−1	50 (Note: Real Sociedad finished ahead of Real Betis and Alavés on head-to-head points: Real Sociedad 6, Real Betis 5, Alavés 5. Real Betis finished ahead of Alavés on goal difference: Real Betis –8, Alavés –11.)	
10	Real Betis	38	14	8	16	44	52	−8	50	
11	Alavés	38	13	11	14	39	50	−11	50	
12	Eibar	38	11	14	13	46	50	−4	47	
13	Leganés	38	11	12	15	37	43	−6	45	
14	Villarreal	38	10	14	14	49	52	−3	44 (Note: Villarreal finished ahead of Levante on head-to-head points: Villarreal 1–1 Levante, Levante 0–2 Villarreal.)	
15	Levante	38	11	11	16	59	66	−7	44	
16	Valladolid	38	10	11	17	32	51	−19	41 (Note: Valladolid finished ahead of Celta Vigo on head-to-head points: Celta Vigo 3–3 Valladolid, Valladolid 2–1 Celta Vigo.)	
17	Celta Vigo	38	10	11	17	53	62	−9	41	
18	Girona (R)	38	9	10	19	37	53	−16	37	Relegation to Segunda División
19	Huesca (R)	38	7	12	19	43	65	−22	33	Relegation to Segunda División
20	Rayo Vallecano (R)	38	8	8	22	41	70	−29	32	Relegation to Segunda División

Source: La Liga, Soccerway
Rules for classification: 1) Points; 2) Head-to-head points; 3) Head-to-head goal difference; 4) Goal difference; 5) Goals scored; 6) Fair-play points (Note: Head-to-head record is used only after all the matches between the teams in question have been played)
(C) Champions; (R) Relegated

==== Segunda División ====
Pos	Team	Pld	W	D	L	GF	GA	GD	Pts	Promotion, qualification or relegation
1	Osasuna (C, P)	42	26	9	7	59	35	+24	87	Promotion to La Liga
2	Granada (P)	42	22	13	7	52	28	+24	79	Promotion to La Liga
3	Málaga	42	21	11	10	51	31	+20	74	Qualification to promotion play-offs
4	Albacete	42	19	14	9	54	38	+16	71	Qualification to promotion play-offs
5	Mallorca (O, P)	42	19	12	11	53	37	+16	69	Qualification to promotion play-offs
6	Deportivo La Coruña	42	17	17	8	50	32	+18	68	Qualification to promotion play-offs
7	Cádiz	42	16	16	10	53	36	+17	64	
8	Oviedo	42	17	12	13	48	48	0	63	
9	Sporting Gijón	42	16	13	13	43	38	+5	61	
10	Almería	42	15	15	12	51	39	+12	60	
11	Elche	42	13	16	13	49	52	−3	55	
12	Las Palmas	42	12	18	12	48	50	−2	54	
13	Extremadura	42	14	11	17	43	47	−4	53	
14	Alcorcón	42	14	10	18	36	42	−6	52	
15	Zaragoza	42	13	12	17	49	51	−2	51	
16	Tenerife	42	11	17	14	40	50	−10	50	
17	Numancia	42	11	16	15	44	50	−6	49	
18	Lugo	42	10	17	15	43	51	−8	47	
19	Rayo Majadahonda (R)	42	12	9	21	46	61	−15	45	Relegation to Segunda División B
20	Gimnàstic (R)	42	9	9	24	30	63	−33	36	Relegation to Segunda División B
21	Córdoba (R)	42	7	13	22	48	79	−31	34	Relegation to Segunda División B
22	Reus (Note: Reus were expelled after the end of the first half of the season due to unpaid wages. Their matches of the second half were given as 1–0 wins to their opponents.) (D)	42	5	6	31	16	48	−32	0	Expelled from the league by the Federation for financial issues

Source: La Liga
Rules for classification: 1) points; 2) head-to-head points; 3) head-to-head goal difference; 4) goal difference; 5) number of goals scored
(C) Champions; (D) Disqualified; (O) Play-off winners; (P) Promoted; (R) Relegated

===== Promotion play-offs =====
Semi-finals
Deportivo La Coruña	4	1	5
Málaga	2	0	2
Mallorca	2	0	2
Albacete	0	1	1

Final
Deportivo La Coruña	2	0	2
Mallorca	0	3	3

==== Segunda División B ====
Group 1
Pos	Team	Pld	Pts
1	Fuenlabrada (O, P)	38	71
2	Ponferradina (O, P)	38	69
3	Atlético Madrid B	38	68
4	Real Madrid Castilla	38	65
5	Cultural Leonesa	38	65
6	Pontevedra	38	62
7	Guijuelo	38	59
8	San Sebastián de los Reyes	38	56
9	Unionistas	38	52
10	Coruxo	38	50
11	Valladolid B	38	49
12	Salamanca UDS	38	49
13	Burgos	38	48
14	Internacional	38	48
15	Las Palmas Atlético	38	48
16	Celta B (O)	38	46
17	Rápido de Bouzas (R)	38	38
18	Unión Adarve (R)	38	36
19	Navalcarnero (R)	38	25
20	Deportivo Fabril (R)	38	24

Source: BDFútbol
(O) Play-off winners;
(P) Promoted;
(R) Relegated

Group 2
Pos	Team	Pld	Pts
1	Racing Santander (O, P)	38	78
2	UD Logroñés	38	72
3	Mirandés (O, P)	38	69
4	Barakaldo	38	61
5	Oviedo B	38	59
6	Athletic Bilbao B	38	57
7	Leioa	38	53
8	Amorebieta	38	53
9	Langreo	38	52
10	Calahorra	38	50
11	Sporting Gijón B	38	49
12	Real Sociedad B	38	45
13	Izarra	38	45
14	Tudelano	38	45
15	Arenas	38	45
16	Real Unión (O)	38	44
17	Gernika (R)	38	42
18	Vitoria (R)	38	35
19	Gimnástica Torrelavega (R)	38	32
20	Cultural Durango (R)	38	30

Source: BDFútbol
(O) Play-off winners;
(P) Promoted;
(R) Relegated

Group 3
Pos	Team	Pld	Pts
1	Atlético Baleares	38	75
2	Hércules	38	67
3	Villarreal B	38	62
4	Cornellà	38	61
5	Espanyol B	38	60
6	Lleida Esportiu	38	56
7	Badalona	38	56
8	Barcelona B	38	53
9	Ebro	38	52
10	Olot	38	48
11	Atlético Levante	38	45
12	Sabadell	38	45
13	Valencia Mestalla	38	44
14	Ejea	38	44
15	Castellón	38	44
16	Alcoyano (R)	38	43
17	Teruel (R)	38	41
18	Conquense (R)	38	39
19	Peralada (R)	38	39
20	Ontinyent (W)	38	0

Source: BDFútbol
(R) Relegated;
(W) Withdrew from the competition

Group 4
Pos	Team	Pld	Pts
1	Recreativo	38	78
2	Cartagena	38	75
3	Melilla	38	72
4	Badajoz	38	66
5	UCAM Murcia	38	66
6	Ibiza	38	63
7	Marbella	38	60
8	San Fernando	38	60
9	Talavera de la Reina	38	50
10	Sevilla Atlético	38	48
11	Murcia	38	48
12	Linense	38	46
13	Atlético Sanluqueño	38	46
14	Recreativo Granada	38	45
15	Don Benito	38	44
16	Jumilla (R)	38	43
17	El Ejido (R)	38	39
18	Villanovense (R)	38	38
19	Atlético Malagueño (R)	38	29
20	Almería B (R)	38	23

Source: BDFútbol
(R) Relegated

==== Group champions' play-offs ====
Semifinals
Racing Santander (a)	0	1	1
Atlético Baleares	0	1	1
Fuenlabrada	3	1	4
Recreativo	0	1	1

Finals
Racing Santander	1	0	1
Fuenlabrada	2	0	2

=== Cup competitions ===
==== Copa del Rey ====
===== Final =====
25 May 2019
21:00 UTC+2

Barcelona	1–2	Valencia
Messi 73'	Report	Gameiro 21'; Rodrigo 33'

Benito Villamarín, Seville
Attendance: 53,698
Referee: Alberto Undiano Mallenco

==== Supercopa de España ====
12 August 2018
21:00 WEST

Sevilla	1–2	Barcelona
Sarabia 9'	Report	Piqué 42'; Dembélé 78'

Ibn Batouta Stadium, Tangier (Morocco)
Attendance: 40,000
Referee: Carlos del Cerro Grande

==== Copa Federación de España ====
Team 1	Agg.	Team 2	1st leg	2nd leg
Mirandés (3) (Castile and León)	5–2	(Catalonia) Cornellà (3)	3–0	2–2

== Women's football ==
=== League season ===
==== Primera División ====
Pos	Team	Pld	W	D	L	GF	GA	GD	Pts	Qualification or relegation
1	Atlético de Madrid (C)	30	28	0	2	96	19	+77	84	Qualification for the UEFA Champions League
2	Barcelona	30	25	3	2	94	15	+79	78	Qualification for the UEFA Champions League
3	Levante	30	17	6	7	52	26	+26	57	
4	Granadilla	30	17	3	10	46	40	+6	54	
5	Athletic Club	30	14	8	8	48	33	+15	50	
6	Betis	30	14	6	10	47	35	+12	48	
7	Real Sociedad	30	13	8	9	51	37	+14	47	
8	Valencia	30	8	11	11	41	53	−12	35	
9	Espanyol	30	9	8	13	31	42	−11	35	
10	Sevilla	30	9	2	19	37	60	−23	29	
11	Logroño	30	8	5	17	38	60	−22	29	
12	Rayo Vallecano	30	8	5	17	27	55	−28	29	
13	Madrid CFF	30	8	3	19	31	65	−34	27	
14	Sporting de Huelva	30	6	7	17	22	50	−28	25	
15	Málaga (R)	30	6	7	17	26	67	−41	25	Relegation to Segunda División
16	Fundación Albacete (R)	30	6	6	18	38	68	−30	24	Relegation to Segunda División

Source: La Liga
Rules for classification: 1) points; 2) head-to-head points; 3) goal difference; 4) number of goals scored
(C) Champions; (R) Relegated

==== Segunda División ====
===== Promotion playoffs =====
Semi-finals
28 April and 5 May
Santa Teresa (a)	1	1	2
Osasuna	0	2	2
28 April and 5 May
Tacón	1	1	2
Zaragoza CFF	1	0	1

Final
12 and 18–19 May
Santa Teresa	1	0	1
Tacón	0	2	2

Semi-finals
28 April and 5 May
Alhama	0	1	1
Deportivo La Coruña	1	5	6
28 April and 5 May
Femarguín	2	1	3
Juan Grande	0	2	2

Final
12 and 18–19 May
Deportivo La Coruña	2	4	6
Femarguín	0	1	1

=== Cup competitions ===
==== Copa de la Reina ====
===== Final =====
11 May 2019
20:30

Atlético de Madrid	1–2	Real Sociedad
E. González 16'	Report	Palacios 19'; Nahikari 61'

Los Cármenes, Granada
Attendance: 17,550
Referee: María Dolores Martínez Madrona
