= 2018–19 UEFA Women's Champions League knockout phase =

Tournament details
- Dates: 12 September 2018 – 18 May 2019
- Teams: 32

The 2018–19 UEFA Women's Champions League knockout phase began on 12 September 2018 and ended on 18 May 2019 with the final at Groupama Arena in Budapest, Hungary, to decide the champions of the 2018–19 UEFA Women's Champions League. A total of 32 teams competed in the knockout phase.

Times are CET/CEST, (Note: CET (UTC+1) for dates from 28 October 2018 up to 30 March 2019 (second legs of round of 16 and both legs of quarter-finals), and CEST (UTC+2) for all other dates.) as listed by UEFA (local times, if different, are in parentheses).

== Qualified teams ==
The knockout phase involved 32 teams: 20 teams which received a bye, and the 12 teams which advanced from the qualifying round (ten group winners and two best runners-ups).

Below are the 32 teams which participated in the knockout phase (with their 2018 UEFA club coefficients, which take into account their performance in European competitions from 2013–14 to 2017–18 plus 33% of their association coefficient from the same time span).

Bye to round of 32
Team	Coeff
(France) Lyon (Title holders)	111.740
(Germany) VfL Wolfsburg	125.390
(France) Paris Saint-Germain	84.740
(Spain) Barcelona	80.170
(Sweden) Rosengård	77.470
(England) Manchester City	57.470
(Germany) Bayern Munich	52.390
(Denmark) Fortuna Hjørring	50.045
(England) Chelsea	47.470
(Denmark) Brøndby	47.045
(Switzerland) Zürich	43.890
(Sweden) Linköping	41.470
(Russia) Zvezda-2005 Perm	37.395
(Czech Republic) Sparta Praha	32.550
(Norway) LSK Kvinner	31.920
(Spain) Atlético Madrid	25.170
(Austria) St. Pölten	23.415
(Italy) Fiorentina	19.385
(Russia) Ryazan-VDV	13.395
(Italy) Juventus	11.385

Advanced from qualifying round
Group	Winners (or best runners-up)	Coeff
1	(Netherlands) Ajax	13.250
2	(Cyprus) Barcelona FA	5.940
3	(Scotland) Glasgow City	35.415
4	(Czech Republic) Slavia Praha	45.550
5	(Serbia) Spartak Subotica	19.285
6	(Ukraine) Zhytlobud-1 Kharkiv	10.470
7	(Kazakhstan) BIIK Kazygurt	28.920
8	(Bosnia and Herzegovina) SFK 2000	14.630
9	(Lithuania) Gintra Universitetas	25.270
10	(Norway) Avaldsnes	13.920
9	(Finland) Honka (Best two runners-up)	3.135
1	(Iceland) Þór/KA (Best two runners-up)	9.930

== Bracket ==
Round of 32
(Netherlands) Ajax	2	2	4
(Czech Republic) Sparta Praha	0	1	1
(Norway) Avaldsnes	0	0	0
(France) Lyon	2	5	7
(Iceland) Þór/KA	0	0	0
(Germany) VfL Wolfsburg	1	2	3
(Spain) Atlético Madrid	1	2	3
(England) Manchester City	1	0	1
(Bosnia and Herzegovina) SFK 2000	0	0	0
(England) Chelsea	5	6	11
(Italy) Fiorentina	2	2	4
(Denmark) Fortuna Hjørring	0	0	0
(Ukraine) Zhytlobud-1 Kharkiv	1	0	1
(Sweden) Linköping	6	4	10
(Austria) St. Pölten	1	0	1
(France) Paris Saint-Germain	4	2	6
(Russia) Ryazan-VDV	0	0	0
(Sweden) Rosengård	1	2	3
(Lithuania) Gintra Universitetas	0	0	0
(Czech Republic) Slavia Praha	3	4	7
(Finland) Honka	0	1	1
(Switzerland) Zürich	1	5	6
(Serbia) Spartak Subotica	0	0	0
(Germany) Bayern Munich	7	4	11
(Kazakhstan) BIIK Kazygurt	3	0	3
(Spain) Barcelona	1	3	4
(Cyprus) Barcelona FA	0	1	1
(Scotland) Glasgow City	2	0	2
(Norway) LSK Kvinner	3	1	4
(Russia) Zvezda-2005 Perm	0	0	0
(Italy) Juventus	2	0	2
(Denmark) Brøndby	2	1	3

Round of 16
(Netherlands) Ajax	0	0	0
(France) Lyon	4	9	13
(Germany) VfL Wolfsburg	4	6	10
(Spain) Atlético Madrid	0	0	0
(England) Chelsea	1	6	7
(Italy) Fiorentina	0	0	0
(Sweden) Linköping	0	2	2
(France) Paris Saint-Germain	2	3	5
(Sweden) Rosengård	2	0	2
(Czech Republic) Slavia Praha	3	0	3
(Switzerland) Zürich	0	0	0
(Germany) Bayern Munich	2	3	5
(Spain) Barcelona	5	3	8
(Scotland) Glasgow City	0	0	0
(Norway) LSK Kvinner	1	2	3
(Denmark) Brøndby	1	0	1

Quarter-finals
(France) Lyon	2	4	6
(Germany) VfL Wolfsburg	1	2	3
(England) Chelsea	2	1	3
(France) Paris Saint-Germain	0	2	2
(Czech Republic) Slavia Praha	1	1	2
(Germany) Bayern Munich	1	5	6
(Spain) Barcelona	3	1	4
(Norway) LSK Kvinner	0	0	0

Semi-finals
(France) Lyon	2	1	3
(England) Chelsea	1	1	2
(Germany) Bayern Munich	0	0	0
(Spain) Barcelona	1	1	2

Final (18 May – Budapest)
(France) Lyon	4
(Spain) Barcelona	1

== Format ==
Each tie in the knockout phase, apart from the final, was played over two legs, with each team playing one leg at home. The team that scores more goals on aggregate over the two legs advanced to the next round. If the aggregate score was level, the away goals rule was applied, i.e. the team that scored more goals away from home over the two legs advanced. If away goals were also equal, then extra time was played. The away goals rule was again applied after extra time, i.e. if there were goals scored during extra time and the aggregate score was still level, the visiting team advanced by virtue of more away goals scored. If no goals were scored during extra time, the tie was decided by penalty shoot-out. In the final, which was played as a single match, if the score was level at the end of normal time, extra time was played, followed by penalty shoot-out if the score remained tied.

The mechanism of the draws for each round is as follows:

- In the draw for the round of 32, the sixteen teams with the highest UEFA club coefficients were seeded (with the title holders being the automatic top seed), and the other sixteen teams were unseeded. The seeded teams were drawn against the unseeded teams, with the seeded teams hosting the second leg. Teams from the same association or the same qualifying round group could not be drawn against each other.
- In the draw for the round of 16, the eight teams with the highest UEFA club coefficients were seeded (with the title holders being the automatic top seed should they qualify), and the other eight teams were unseeded. The seeded teams were drawn against the unseeded teams, with the order of legs decided by draw. Teams from the same association could not be drawn against each other.
- In the draws for the quarter-finals and semi-finals, there was no seeding, and teams from the same association could be drawn against each other. As the draws for the quarter-finals and semi-finals were held together before the quarter-finals were played, the identity of the quarter-final winners was not known at the time of the semi-final draw. A draw was also held to determine which semi-final winner was designated as the "home" team for the final (for administrative purposes as it is played at a neutral venue).

On 17 July 2014, the UEFA emergency panel ruled that Ukrainian and Russian clubs would not be drawn against each other "until further notice" due to the political unrest between the countries.

== Schedule ==
The schedule of the knockout phase is as follows (all draws are held at the UEFA headquarters in Nyon, Switzerland).

Knockout phase schedule
Round	Draw	First leg	Second leg
Round of 32	17 August 2018	12–13 September 2018	26–27 September 2018
Round of 16	1 October 2018	17–18 October 2018	31 October – 1 November 2018
Quarter-finals	9 November 2018	20–21 March 2019	27–28 March 2019
Semi-finals	9 November 2018	20–21 April 2019	27–28 April 2019
Final	9 November 2018	18 May 2019 at Groupama Arena, Budapest	

== Round of 32 ==
The draw for the round of 32 was held on 17 August 2018, 14:00 CEST, at the UEFA headquarters in Nyon, Switzerland.

Seeded	Unseeded
(France) Lyon; (Germany) VfL Wolfsburg; (France) Paris Saint-Germain; (Spain) Barcelona; (Sweden) Rosengård; (England) Manchester City; (Germany) Bayern Munich; (Denmark) Fortuna Hjørring; (England) Chelsea; (Denmark) Brøndby; (Czech Republic) Slavia Praha; (Switzerland) Zürich; (Sweden) Linköping; (Russia) Zvezda-2005 Perm; (Scotland) Glasgow City; (Czech Republic) Sparta Praha	(Norway) LSK Kvinner; (Kazakhstan) BIIK Kazygurt; (Lithuania) Gintra Universitetas; (Spain) Atlético Madrid; (Austria) St. Pölten; (Italy) Fiorentina; (Serbia) Spartak Subotica; (Bosnia and Herzegovina) SFK 2000; (Norway) Avaldsnes; (Russia) Ryazan-VDV; (Netherlands) Ajax; (Italy) Juventus; (Ukraine) Zhytlobud-1 Kharkiv; (Iceland) Þór/KA; (Cyprus) Barcelona FA; (Finland) Honka

Notes

1. ^{Q} Advanced from qualifying round.

=== Overview ===
The first legs were played on 12 and 13 September, and the second legs on 26 and 27 September 2018.

Team 1	Agg.	Team 2	1st leg	2nd leg
Honka (Finland)	1–6	(Switzerland) Zürich	0–1	1–5
Fiorentina (Italy)	4–0	(Denmark) Fortuna Hjørring	2–0	2–0
Ajax (Netherlands)	4–1	(Czech Republic) Sparta Praha	2–0	2–1
Avaldsnes (Norway)	0–7	(France) Lyon	0–2	0–5
Ryazan-VDV (Russia)	0–3	(Sweden) Rosengård	0–1	0–2
Juventus (Italy)	2–3	(Denmark) Brøndby	2–2	0–1
SFK 2000 (Bosnia and Herzegovina)	0–11	(England) Chelsea	0–5	0–6
Atlético Madrid (Spain)	3–1	(England) Manchester City	1–1	2–0
Þór/KA (Iceland)	0–3	(Germany) VfL Wolfsburg	0–1	0–2
Gintra Universitetas (Lithuania)	0–7	(Czech Republic) Slavia Praha	0–3	0–4
BIIK Kazygurt (Kazakhstan)	3–4	(Spain) Barcelona	3–1	0–3
Barcelona FA (Cyprus)	1–2	(Scotland) Glasgow City	0–2	1–0
Spartak Subotica (Serbia)	0–11	(Germany) Bayern Munich	0–7	0–4
St. Pölten (Austria)	1–6	(France) Paris Saint-Germain	1–4	0–2
Zhytlobud-1 Kharkiv (Ukraine)	1–10	(Sweden) Linköping	1–6	0–4
LSK Kvinner (Norway)	4–0	(Russia) Zvezda-2005 Perm	3–0	1–0

=== Matches ===
12 September 2018
18:00 (19:00 EEST)

Honka (Finland)	0–1	(Switzerland) Zürich
	Report	Moser 60'

Telia 5G -areena, Helsinki
Attendance: 572
Referee: Barbara Poxhofer (Austria)
27 September 2018
19:00

Zürich (Switzerland)	5–1	(Finland) Honka
Humm 28', 45+1', 51'; Moser 55' (pen.); Sow 64'	Report	Rantala 90'

Letzigrund, Zürich
Attendance: 3,066
Referee: Eleni Antoniou (Greece)

Zürich won 6–1 on aggregate.

12 September 2018
19:00

Fiorentina (Italy)	2–0	(Denmark) Fortuna Hjørring
Mauro 9', 63'	Report

Stadio Artemio Franchi, Florence
Attendance: 1,715
Referee: Ivana Martinčić (Croatia)
26 September 2018
19:00

Fortuna Hjørring (Denmark)	0–2	(Italy) Fiorentina
	Report	Clelland 15', 25'

Hjørring Stadium, Hjørring
Attendance: 1,084
Referee: Désirée Grundbacher (Switzerland)

Fiorentina won 4–0 on aggregate.

12 September 2018
19:00

Ajax (Netherlands)	2–0	(Czech Republic) Sparta Praha
Salmi 47'; Zeeman 55'	Report

Sportpark De Toekomst, Duivendrecht
Attendance: 998
Referee: Melis Özçiğdem (Turkey)
26 September 2018
18:00

Sparta Praha (Czech Republic)	1–2	(Netherlands) Ajax
Burkenroad 27'	Report	Lewerissa 50', 52'

Generali Arena, Prague
Attendance: 558
Referee: Silvia Domingos (Portugal)

Ajax won 4–1 on aggregate.

12 September 2018
18:00

Avaldsnes (Norway)	0–2	(France) Lyon
	Report	Henry 50'; Majri 77'

Haugesund Stadion, Haugesund
Attendance: 2,319
Referee: Marta Frias Acedo (Spain)
27 September 2018
18:30

Lyon (France)	5–0	(Norway) Avaldsnes
Majri 8'; Le Sommer 22', 31'; Hegerberg 55', 81'	Report

Groupama OL Training Center, Décines-Charpieu
Attendance: 1,214
Referee: Petra Pavlikova (Slovakia)

Lyon won 7–0 on aggregate.

12 September 2018
14:00 (15:00 MSK)

Ryazan-VDV (Russia)	0–1	(Sweden) Rosengård
	Report	Belomyttseva 90' (o.g.)

CSK Stadium, Ryazan
Attendance: 4,500
Referee: Hristiana Guteva (Bulgaria)
26 September 2018
19:00

Rosengård (Sweden)	2–0	(Russia) Ryazan-VDV
Brown 18'; Wieder 75'	Report

Malmö IP, Malmö
Attendance: 711
Referee: Karolina Radzik-Johan (Poland)

Rosengård won 3–0 on aggregate.

12 September 2018
19:30

Juventus (Italy)	2–2	(Denmark) Brøndby
Bonansea 43', 84'	Report	Sørensen 60'; Gejl 72'

Stadio Silvio Piola, Novara
Attendance: 1,001
Referee: Anastasia Pustovoitova (Russia)
26 September 2018
18:00

Brøndby (Denmark)	1–0	(Italy) Juventus
Sørensen 33'	Report

Brøndby Stadium, Brøndbyvester
Attendance: 8,531
Referee: Florence Guillemin (France)

Brøndby won 3–2 on aggregate.

12 September 2018
16:00

SFK 2000 (Bosnia and Herzegovina)	0–5	(England) Chelsea
	Report	Bright 6'; Spence 22'; Thorisdottir 36'; Ji 87'; Engman 89'

Asim Ferhatović Hase Stadium, Sarajevo
Attendance: 2,200
Referee: Frida Nielsen (Denmark)
26 September 2018
20:30 (19:30 BST)

Chelsea (England)	6–0	(Bosnia and Herzegovina) SFK 2000
Spence 4'; Kirby 31', 77'; Mjelde 50'; Blundell 86'; Cuthbert 90'	Report

Kingsmeadow, Kingston upon Thames
Attendance: 667
Referee: Simona Ghisletta (Switzerland)

Chelsea won 11–0 on aggregate.

13 September 2018
19:30

Atlético Madrid (Spain)	1–1	(England) Manchester City
Robles 89'	Report	Bonner 16'

Estadio Cerro del Espino, Majadahonda
Attendance: 1,671
Referee: Sara Persson (Sweden)
26 September 2018
20:00 (19:00 BST)

Manchester City (England)	0–2	(Spain) Atlético Madrid
	Report	Meseguer 4'; Ludmila 45+1'

Academy Stadium, Manchester
Attendance: 1,178
Referee: Lina Lehtovaara (Finland)

Atlético Madrid won 3–1 on aggregate.

12 September 2018
18:30 (16:30 WET)

Þór/KA (Iceland)	0–1	(Germany) VfL Wolfsburg
	Report	Harder 31'

Þórsvöllur, Akureyri
Attendance: 1,529
Referee: Eszter Urbán (Hungary)
26 September 2018
18:00

VfL Wolfsburg (Germany)	2–0	(Iceland) Þór/KA
Harder 28'; Masar 66'	Report

AOK Stadion, Wolfsburg
Attendance: 1,213
Referee: Amy Fearn (England)

VfL Wolfsburg won 3–0 on aggregate.

13 September 2018
17:00 (18:00 EEST)

Gintra Universitetas (Lithuania)	0–3	(Czech Republic) Slavia Praha
	Report	M. Dubcová 63', 88'; Szewieczková 79'

Savivaldybė Stadium, Šiauliai
Attendance: 1,500
Referee: Tanja Subotič (Slovenia)
27 September 2018
18:30

Slavia Praha (Czech Republic)	4–0	(Lithuania) Gintra Universitetas
Kožárová 2', 28', 68' (pen.); Herndon 73'	Report

FK Viktoria Stadion, Prague
Attendance: 651
Referee: Paula Brady (Ireland)

Slavia Praha won 7–0 on aggregate.

12 September 2018
13:00 (17:00 ALMT)

BIIK Kazygurt (Kazakhstan)	3–1	(Spain) Barcelona
Putellas 45+6' (o.g.); Ikwaput 49'; Gabelia 60'	Report	Duggan 66'

BIIK Stadium, Shymkent
Attendance: 2,800
Referee: Zuzana Valentová (Slovakia)
26 September 2018
18:00

Barcelona (Spain)	3–0	(Kazakhstan) BIIK Kazygurt
Guijarro 4'; Torrejón 48'; Martens 90'	Report

Mini Estadi, Barcelona
Attendance: 1,667
Referee: Justina Lavrenovaitė (Lithuania)

Barcelona won 4–3 on aggregate.

12 September 2018
15:30 (16:30 EEST)

Barcelona FA (Cyprus)	0–2	(Scotland) Glasgow City
	Report	Lauder 3'; Crichton 83'

Tsirio Stadium, Limassol
Attendance: 417
Referee: Viola Raudziņa (Latvia)
27 September 2018
20:30 (19:30 BST)

Glasgow City (Scotland)	0–1	(Cyprus) Barcelona FA
	Report	Freda 7'

Petershill Park, Glasgow
Attendance: 511
Referee: Ifeoma Kulmala (Finland)

Glasgow City won 2–1 on aggregate.

12 September 2018
16:30

Spartak Subotica (Serbia)	0–7	(Germany) Bayern Munich
	Report	Lewandowski 12'; Roord 29', 39'; Magull 64' (pen.); Damnjanović 82'; Demann 87'; Beerensteyn 90+3'

Stadion na Somborskoj kapiji, Subotica
Attendance: 600
Referee: Tess Olofsson (Sweden)
26 September 2018
19:00

Bayern Munich (Germany)	4–0	(Serbia) Spartak Subotica
Beerensteyn 18', 53'; Magull 55'; Islacker 64'	Report

FC Bayern Campus, Munich
Attendance: 662
Referee: Elvira Nurmustafina (Kazakhstan)

Bayern Munich won 11–0 on aggregate.

12 September 2018
19:10

St. Pölten (Austria)	1–4	(France) Paris Saint-Germain
Vágó 65' (pen.)	Report	Bruun 4'; Diani 20'; Katoto 86'; Dudek 90'

NV Arena, Sankt Pölten
Attendance: 2,412
Referee: Rebecca Welch (England)
27 September 2018
19:00

Paris Saint-Germain (France)	2–0	(Austria) St. Pölten
Katoto 61' (pen.); Pekel 84'	Report

Stade Jean-Bouin, Paris
Attendance: 682
Referee: Ewa Augustyn (Poland)

Paris Saint-Germain won 6–1 on aggregate.

12 September 2018
17:00 (18:00 EEST)

Zhytlobud-1 Kharkiv (Ukraine)	1–6	(Sweden) Linköping
Voronina 70'	Report	Maanum 26', 60', 86'; Hurtig 48'; D'Anjou 74'; Rasmussen 82'

Metalist Oblast Sports Complex, Kharkiv
Attendance: 6,000
Referee: Marta Huerta De Aza (Spain)
26 September 2018
18:00

Linköping (Sweden)	4–0	(Ukraine) Zhytlobud-1 Kharkiv
Lantz 9'; Angeldal 11'; D'Anjou 78'; Almqvist 84'	Report

Linköping Arena, Linköping
Attendance: 518
Referee: Ivana Projkovska (Macedonia)

Linköping won 10–1 on aggregate.

13 September 2018
19:00

LSK Kvinner (Norway)	3–0	(Russia) Zvezda-2005 Perm
Sønstevold 2'; Kvernvolden 14'; Haavi 80'	Report

Jessheim Stadion, Jessheim
Attendance: 710
Referee: Maria Marotta (Italy)
27 September 2018
18:30 (19:30 MSK)

Zvezda-2005 Perm (Russia)	0–1	(Norway) LSK Kvinner
	Report	Haavi 52'

Sapsan Arena, Moscow
Attendance: 100
Referee: Angelika Söder (Germany)

LSK Kvinner won 4–0 on aggregate.

== Round of 16 ==
The draw for the round of 16 was held on 1 October 2018, 13:00 CEST, at the UEFA headquarters in Nyon, Switzerland.

Seeded	Unseeded
(France) Lyon; (Germany) VfL Wolfsburg; (France) Paris Saint-Germain; (Spain) Barcelona; (Sweden) Rosengård; (Germany) Bayern Munich; (England) Chelsea; (Denmark) Brøndby	(Czech Republic) Slavia Praha; (Switzerland) Zürich; (Sweden) Linköping; (Scotland) Glasgow City; (Norway) LSK Kvinner; (Spain) Atlético Madrid; (Italy) Fiorentina; (Netherlands) Ajax

=== Overview ===
The first legs were played on 17 and 18 October, and the second legs on 31 October and 1 November 2018.

Team 1	Agg.	Team 2	1st leg	2nd leg
Zürich (Switzerland)	0–5	(Germany) Bayern Munich	0–2	0–3
VfL Wolfsburg (Germany)	10–0	(Spain) Atlético Madrid	4–0	6–0
Ajax (Netherlands)	0–13	(France) Lyon	0–4	0–9
Barcelona (Spain)	8–0	(Scotland) Glasgow City	5–0	3–0
Linköping (Sweden)	2–5	(France) Paris Saint-Germain	0–2	2–3
Chelsea (England)	7–0	(Italy) Fiorentina	1–0	6–0
Rosengård (Sweden)	2–3	(Czech Republic) Slavia Praha	2–3	0–0
LSK Kvinner (Norway)	3–1	(Denmark) Brøndby	1–1	2–0

=== Matches ===
17 October 2018
19:00

Zürich (Switzerland)	0–2	(Germany) Bayern Munich
	Report	Herzog 12' (o.g.); Škorvánková 31'

Letzigrund, Zürich
Attendance: 4,376
Referee: Sara Persson (Sweden)
31 October 2018
19:00

Bayern Munich (Germany)	3–0	(Switzerland) Zürich
Däbritz 42'; Roord 66'; Škorvánková 73'	Report

FC Bayern Campus, Munich
Attendance: 652
Referee: Petra Pavlíková (Slovakia)

Bayern Munich won 5–0 on aggregate.

17 October 2018
19:00

VfL Wolfsburg (Germany)	4–0	(Spain) Atlético Madrid
Harder 46', 67'; Pajor 49'; Hansen 61'	Report

AOK Stadion, Wolfsburg
Attendance: 1,523
Referee: Esther Staubli (Switzerland)
31 October 2018
20:00

Atlético Madrid (Spain)	0–6	(Germany) VfL Wolfsburg
	Report	Popp 15'; Hansen 46'; Harder 61', 65'; Minde 82'; Pajor 90+3'

Estadio Cerro del Espino, Majadahonda
Attendance: 652
Referee: Anastasia Pustovoitova (Russia)

VfL Wolfsburg won 10–0 on aggregate.

17 October 2018
19:00

Ajax (Netherlands)	0–4	(France) Lyon
	Report	Majri 12'; Bacha 27'; Hegerberg 57'; Christiansen 89'

Sportpark De Toekomst, Duivendrecht
Attendance: 1,783
Referee: Pernilla Larsson (Sweden)
31 October 2018
19:00

Lyon (France)	9–0	(Netherlands) Ajax
Cascarino 4', 8'; Renard 17', 22'; Hegerberg 57'; Mbock Bathy 62', 89'; Majri 69'; Bronze 90+3'	Report

Groupama OL Training Center, Décines-Charpieu
Attendance: 1,480
Referee: Katalin Kulcsár (Hungary)

Lyon won 13–0 on aggregate.

17 October 2018
18:30

Barcelona (Spain)	5–0	(Scotland) Glasgow City
Hamraoui 12'; Bonmatí 38'; Guijarro 41'; Alves 68'; León 81'	Report

Mini Estadi, Barcelona
Attendance: 1,639
Referee: Ivana Martinčić (Croatia)
1 November 2018
20:30 (19:30 GMT)

Glasgow City (Scotland)	0–3	(Spain) Barcelona
	Report	Duggan 13', 51'; Putellas 48'

Petershill Park, Glasgow
Attendance: 795
Referee: Désirée Grundbacher (Switzerland)

Barcelona won 8–0 on aggregate.

17 October 2018
18:30

Linköping (Sweden)	0–2	(France) Paris Saint-Germain
	Report	Katoto 42'; Wang 80'

Linköping Arena, Linköping
Attendance: 1,639
Referee: Sandra Bastos (Portugal)
31 October 2018
20:00

Paris Saint-Germain (France)	3–2	(Sweden) Linköping
Kildemoes 30' (o.g.); Katoto 33', 50'	Report	Oskarsson 47'; Lantz 71'

Stade Jean-Bouin, Paris
Attendance: 899
Referee: Riem Hussein (Germany)

Paris Saint-Germain won 5–2 on aggregate.

17 October 2018
20:35 (19:35 BST)

Chelsea (England)	1–0	(Italy) Fiorentina
Carney 8' (pen.)	Report

Kingsmeadow, Kingston upon Thames
Attendance: 804
Referee: Stéphanie Frappart (France)
31 October 2018
19:30

Fiorentina (Italy)	0–6	(England) Chelsea
	Report	Spence 24'; Kirby 38', 53' (pen.), 63'; Cuthbert 57'; Bachmann 67'

Stadio Artemio Franchi, Florence
Attendance: 3,015
Referee: Lina Lehtovaara (Finland)

Chelsea won 7–0 on aggregate.

18 October 2018
19:00

Rosengård (Sweden)	2–3	(Czech Republic) Slavia Praha
Utland 22'; Mittag 52'	Report	Pincová 14'; Kožárová 37'; Divišová 57'

Malmö IP, Malmö
Attendance: 811
Referee: Amy Rayner (England)
1 November 2018
18:30

Slavia Praha (Czech Republic)	0–0	(Sweden) Rosengård
	Report

Eden Arena, Prague
Attendance: 1,451
Referee: Cheryl Foster (Wales)

Slavia Praha won 3–2 on aggregate.

17 October 2018
18:30

LSK Kvinner (Norway)	1–1	(Denmark) Brøndby
Reiten 30'	Report	Henriksen 35'

Jessheim Stadion, Jessheim
Attendance: 1,021
Referee: Eszter Urbán (Hungary)
31 October 2018
18:00

Brøndby (Denmark)	0–2	(Norway) LSK Kvinner
	Report	Sønstevold 70'; Hansen 78'

Brøndby Stadium, Brøndbyvester
Attendance: 2,975
Referee: Meliz Özçiğdem (Turkey)

LSK Kvinner won 3–1 on aggregate.

== Quarter-finals ==
The draw for the quarter-finals was held on 9 November 2018, 13:00 CET, at the UEFA headquarters in Nyon, Switzerland.

=== Overview ===
The first legs were played on 20 and 21 March, and the second legs on 27 March 2019.

During the Chelsea - PSG tie a number of arrests were made by the Metropolitan Police of travelling supporters of PSG who were arrested for possession of illegal drugs, weapons and vandalism. This was after disorder was reported at Waterloo and Wimbledon Train stations and a bus carrying PSG supporters being searched and barred entry to Kingsmeadow Stadium.

Team 1	Agg.	Team 2	1st leg	2nd leg
Slavia Praha (Czech Republic)	2–6	(Germany) Bayern Munich	1–1	1–5
Barcelona (Spain)	4–0	(Norway) LSK Kvinner	3–0	1–0
Lyon (France)	6–3	(Germany) VfL Wolfsburg	2–1	4–2
Chelsea (England)	3–2	(France) Paris Saint-Germain	2–0	1–2

=== Matches ===
20 March 2019
18:30

Slavia Praha (Czech Republic)	1–1	(Germany) Bayern Munich
Svitková 73'	Report	Rolfö 62'

Eden Arena, Prague
Attendance: 6,822
Referee: Rebecca Welch (England)
27 March 2019
19:30

Bayern Munich (Germany)	5–1	(Czech Republic) Slavia Praha
Rolfö 24'; Leupolz 33'; Islacker 41', 55'; Roord 83'	Report	Svitková 77'

FC Bayern Campus, Munich
Attendance: 1,040
Referee: Monika Mularczyk (Poland)

Bayern Munich won 6–2 on aggregate.

20 March 2019
19:00

Barcelona (Spain)	3–0	(Norway) LSK Kvinner
Duggan 3', 24'; Caldentey 36' (pen.)	Report

Mini Estadi, Barcelona
Attendance: 5,563
Referee: Riem Hussein (Germany)
27 March 2019
18:30

LSK Kvinner (Norway)	0–1	(Spain) Barcelona
	Report	Martens 7'

Åråsen Stadion, Lillestrøm
Attendance: 5,655
Referee: Stéphanie Frappart (France)

Barcelona won 4–0 on aggregate.

20 March 2019
20:45

Lyon (France)	2–1	(Germany) VfL Wolfsburg
Le Sommer 11'; Renard 18'	Report	Fischer 64'

Parc Olympique Lyonnais, Décines-Charpieu
Attendance: 17,840
Referee: Kateryna Monzul (Ukraine)
27 March 2019
18:15

VfL Wolfsburg (Germany)	2–4	(France) Lyon
Harder 53', 56'	Report	Marozsán 8'; Renard 25' (pen.); Le Sommer 60', 80'

AOK Stadion, Wolfsburg
Attendance: 4,445
Referee: Lina Lehtovaara (Finland)

Lyon won 6–3 on aggregate.

21 March 2019
20:05 (19:05 GMT)

Chelsea (England)	2–0	(France) Paris Saint-Germain
Blundell 73'; Cuthbert 88'	Report

Kingsmeadow, Kingston upon Thames
Attendance: 2,616
Referee: Ivana Martinčić (Croatia)
27 March 2019
19:00

Paris Saint-Germain (France)	2–1	(England) Chelsea
Diani 47'; Berger 56' (o.g.)	Report	Mjelde 90+1'

Stade Jean-Bouin, Paris
Attendance: 13,220
Referee: Sandra Bastos (Portugal)

Chelsea won 3–2 on aggregate.

== Semi-finals ==
The draw for the semi-finals was held on 9 November 2018, 13:00 CET (after the quarter-final draw), at the UEFA headquarters in Nyon, Switzerland.

=== Overview ===
The first legs were played on 21 April, and the second legs on 28 April 2019.

Team 1	Agg.	Team 2	1st leg	2nd leg
Lyon (France)	3–2	(England) Chelsea	2–1	1–1
Bayern Munich (Germany)	0–2	(Spain) Barcelona	0–1	0–1

=== Matches ===
21 April 2019
17:00

Lyon (France)	2–1	(England) Chelsea
Cascarino 27'; Henry 39'	Report	Cuthbert 72'

Parc Olympique Lyonnais, Décines-Charpieu
Attendance: 22,911
Referee: Katalin Kulcsár (Hungary)
28 April 2019
15:00 (14:00 BST)

Chelsea (England)	1–1	(France) Lyon
Ji 34'	Report	Le Sommer 17'

Kingsmeadow, Kingston upon Thames
Attendance: 4,670
Referee: Sara Persson (Sweden)

Lyon won 3–2 on aggregate.

21 April 2019
18:00

Bayern Munich (Germany)	0–1	(Spain) Barcelona
	Report	Hamraoui 63'

FC Bayern Campus, Munich
Attendance: 2,500
Referee: Jana Adámková (Czech Republic)
28 April 2019
12:00

Barcelona (Spain)	1–0	(Germany) Bayern Munich
Caldentey 45+2' (pen.)	Report

Mini Estadi, Barcelona
Attendance: 12,764
Referee: Esther Staubli (Switzerland)

Barcelona won 2–0 on aggregate.

== Final ==
The final was played on 18 May 2019 at the Groupama Arena in Budapest. The "home" team for the final (for administrative purposes) was determined by an additional draw held after the quarter-final and semi-final draws.

18 May 2019
18:00

Lyon (France)	4–1	(Spain) Barcelona
Marozsán 5'; Hegerberg 14', 19', 30'	Report	Oshoala 89'

Groupama Arena, Budapest
Attendance: 19,487
Referee: Anastasia Pustovoitova (Russia)
