= Marta Torrejón =

Spanish footballer (born 1990)

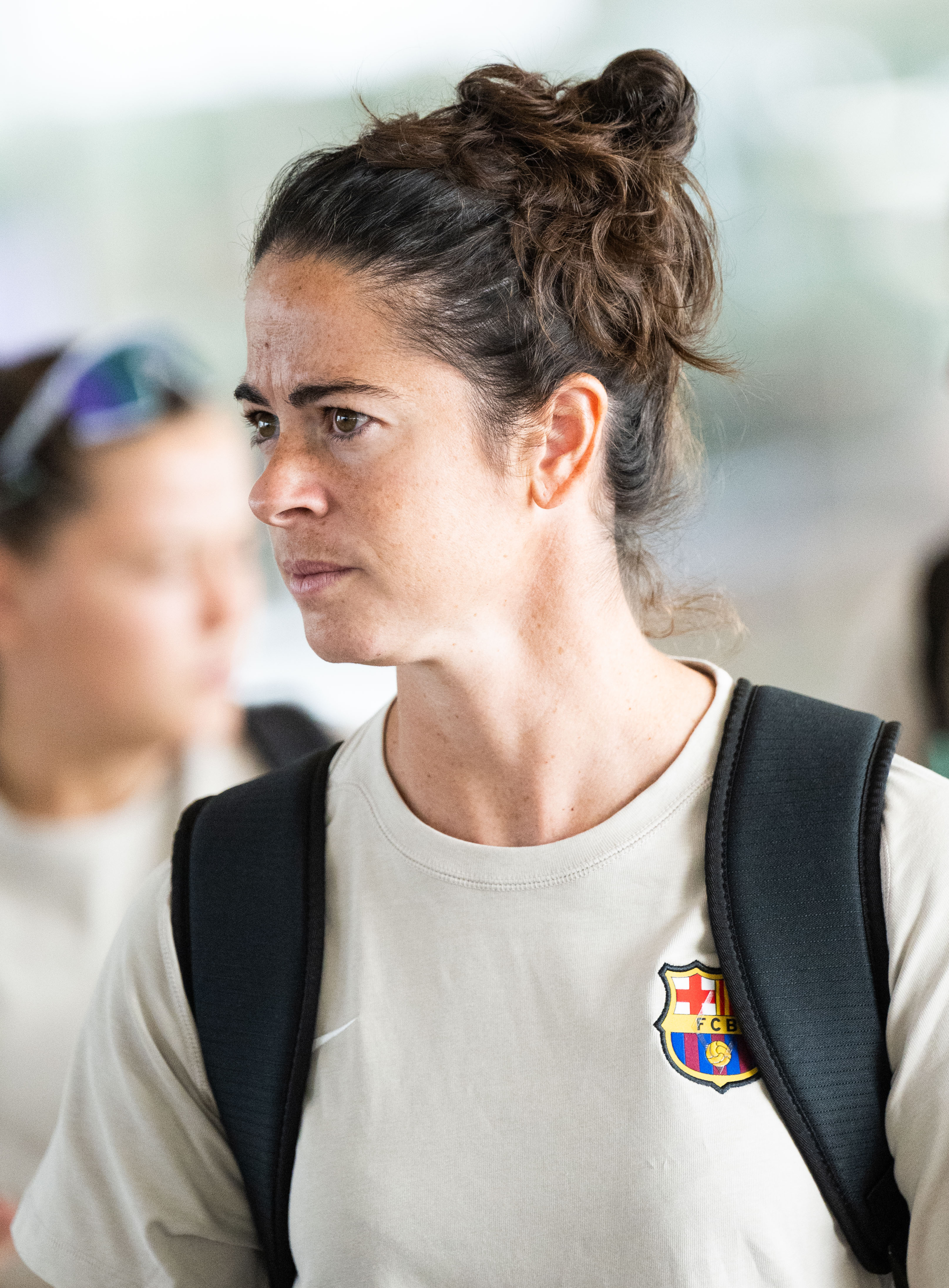
- Torrejón in 2023

Personal information
- Full name: Marta Torrejón Moya
- Date of birth: 27 February 1990 (age 36)
- Place of birth: Mataró, Catalonia, Spain
- Height: 1.71 m (5 ft 7 in)
- Position: Defender

Team information
- Current team: Barcelona
- Number: 8

Youth career
- 1998–2001: Salesians
- 2001–2004: Espanyol

Senior career*
Years	Team	Apps	(Gls)
2004–2013	Espanyol	201	(26)
2013–	Barcelona	503	(75)

International career
2006–2009	Spain U-19	23	(6)
2007–2019	Spain	90	(8)
2007–2025	Catalonia	4	(0)
- * Club domestic league appearances and goals as of 22 November 2026

Marta Torrejón Moya (Spanish pronunciation: [ˈmaɾta toreˈxom ˈmoʝa]; (Note: In isolation, Torrejón is pronounced [toreˈxon].) born 27 February 1990) is a Spanish professional footballer who plays as a defender for FC Barcelona, which she captains, and the Catalonia national team. She formerly captained the Spain national team, making 90 appearances and scoring 8 goals.

== Club career ==
Torrejón debuted in the Superliga Femenina for Espanyol at just 14 years old. In 2011, she started in the final of the Copa de la Reina de Fútbol, where they lost in extra time versus her future club, Barcelona.

Two years later, at age 23, she signed for FC Barcelona and is currently the club's vice-captain.

Torrejón has won three league titles and three Copas de la Reina with Barcelona.

In the 2016–17 season, Barcelona reached the semi-finals of the UEFA Champions League for the first time in the club's history. They were knocked out 5–1 on aggregate by Paris Saint Germain, where Torrejón started both matches.

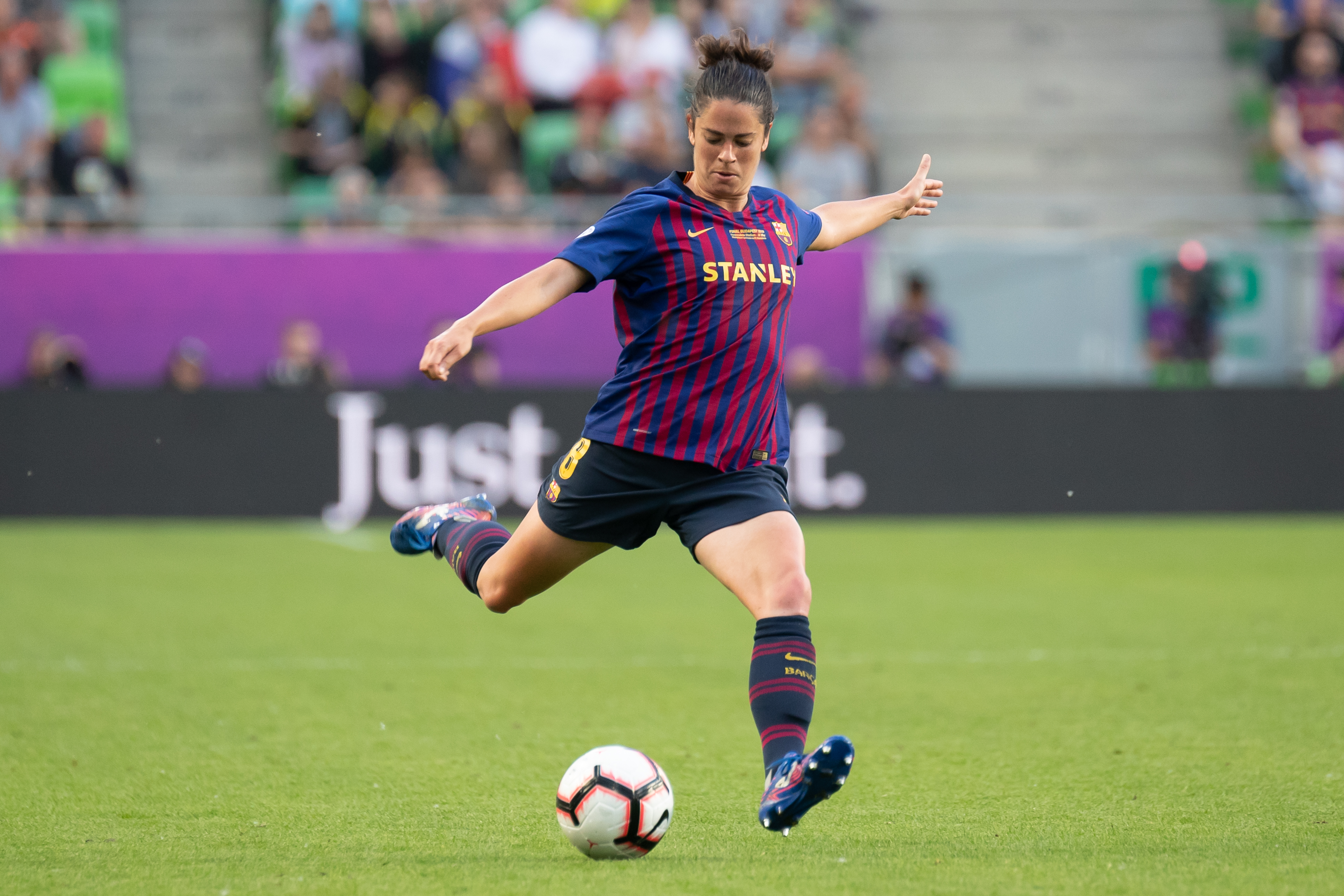
Torrejón on the ball during the 2019 UEFA Women's Champions League Final

In the 2018–19 season, she played an integral role in Barcelona's defense as they made it to the final of the UEFA Women's Champions League for the first time in the club's history. Torrejón started both games versus Bayern, where Barcelona won 2–0 on aggregate. On 18 May 2019, Torrejón started in FCB Femení's first ever UWCL final versus Lyon, who went on to win the match 4–1.

In 2020, Torrejón featured for both matches in the first edition of the Supercopa Femenina. In the final against Real Sociedad, she scored 4 of Barcelona's 10 goals and was named MVP of the tournament.

Despite taking a secondary role as either wingback or central defender in the 2023–24 season, Torrejón was reliably used in the league and scored eight goals – Sport considered her a "luxury" as a defensive substitute who offers attacking drive.

== International career ==
Torrejón made her senior Spain national team debut in November 2007, a 1–0 defeat to England in Shrewsbury.

In June 2013, national team coach Ignacio Quereda selected Torrejón in the squad for UEFA Euro 2013 in Sweden. She played every minute of Spain's campaign, which ended with a 3–1 defeat to Norway in the quarter-finals.

She was part of Spain's squad for the 2015 World Cup in Canada, playing every minute of the team's campaign. After Spain's poor performance of two losses and a draw in the group stages, she and her 22 teammates from the tournament called for coach Ignacio Quereda's resignation from the national team.

On 20 May 2019, Torrejón was called up to the Spain squad for the 2019 FIFA World Cup. She played two games at the 2019 World Cup in France. The match against Germany would end up being her final appearance for Spain.

After the 2019 World Cup, she announced her retirement from the national team on Twitter. She retired with the most ever caps for a Spanish women's national team player with 90. Her record was later surpassed by Alexia Putellas on 26 October 2021.

== Personal life ==
Her brother Marc Torrejón is a former footballer. She is in a romantic relationship with fellow FC Barcelona player Caroline Graham Hansen.

She has a degree in Biology, and is currently studying History and Geography from a university in Barcelona.

== Career statistics ==
=== International ===
As of match played 25 June 2019

Appearances and goals by national team and year
National team	Year	Apps	Goals
Spain	2007	1	0
Spain	2008	6	1
Spain	2009	4	0
Spain	2010	3	1
Spain	2011	5	0
Spain	2012	7	1
Spain	2013	11	1
Spain	2014	7	1
Spain	2015	13	1
Spain	2016	9	2
Spain	2017	14	0
Spain	2018	3	0
Spain	2019	7	0
Total		90	8

Scores and results list Spain's goal tally first, score column indicates score after each Torrejón goal.

List of international goals scored by Marta Torrejón
No.	Date	Venue	Opponent	Score	Result	Competition	Ref.
1	8 May 2008	Las Rozas de Madrid, Spain	Czech Republic	4–1	4–1	2009 UEFA Euro qualification	
2	7 April 2010	Guadalajara, Spain	Turkey	3–0	5–1	2011 FIFA World Cup qualification	
3	5 April 2012	Las Rozas de Madrid, Spain	Kazakhstan	12–0	13–0	2013 UEFA Euro qualification	
4	27 October 2013	Collado, Spain	Estonia	2–0	6–0	2015 FIFA Women's World Cup qualification	
5	10 April 2014	Skopje, North Macedonia	North Macedonia	3–0	10–0	2015 FIFA Women's World Cup qualification	
6	11 February 2015	San Pedro del Pinatar, Spain	Belgium	1–0	2–1	Friendly	
7	26 September 2016	Leganés, Spain	Finland	1–0	5–0	2017 UEFA Euro qualification	
8	25 October 2016	Guadalajara, Spain	England	1–1	1–2	Friendly	

== Honours ==
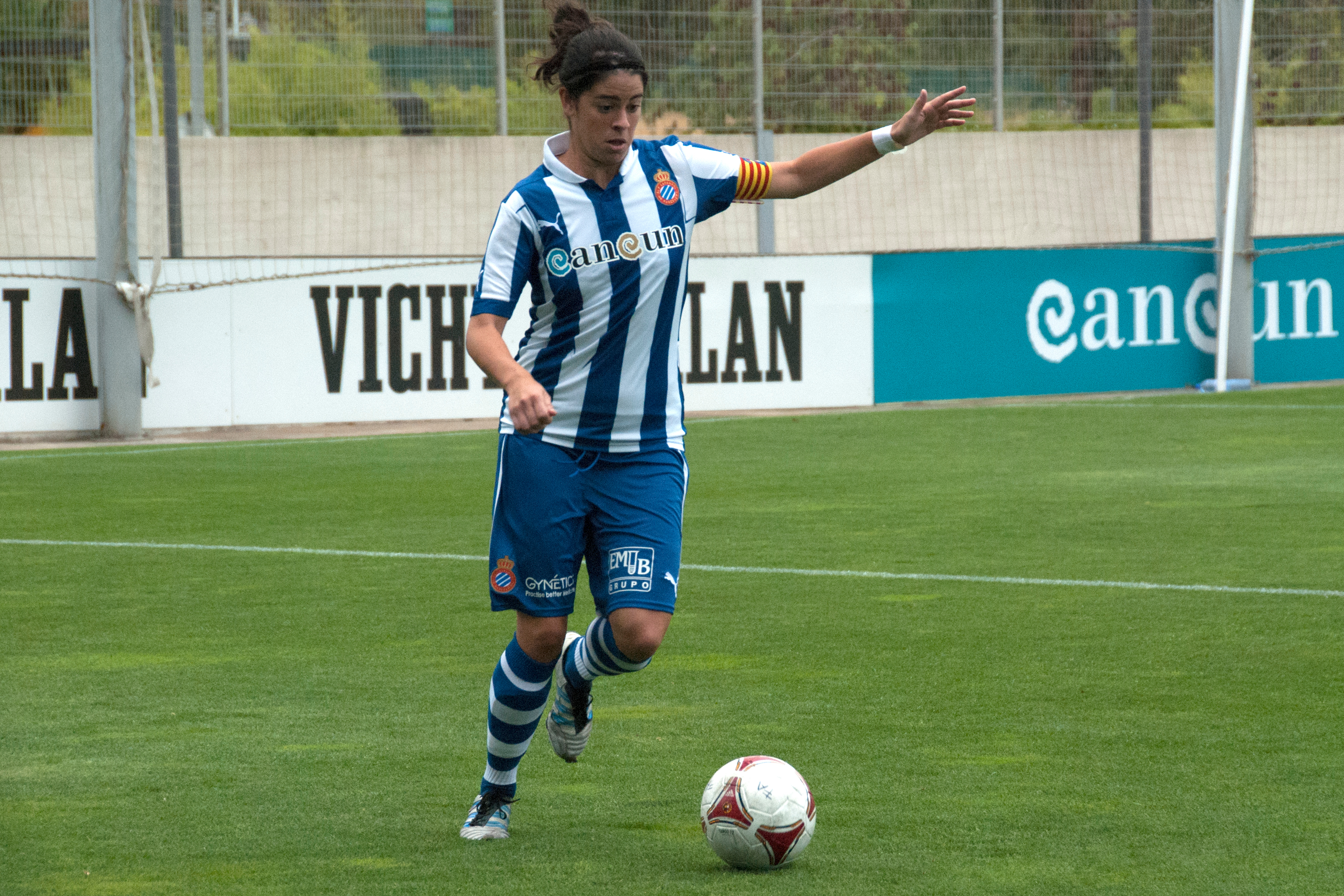
Torrejón captaining Espanyol in 2012

Espanyol

- Primera División: 2005–06
- Copa de la Reina: 2006, 2009, 2010, 2012
- Copa Catalunya: 2005, 2006, 2007, 2008

Barcelona

- Primera División: 2013–14, 2014–15, 2019–20, 2020–21, 2021–22, 2022–23, 2023–24, 2024–25, 2025–26
- Copa de la Reina: 2014, 2017, 2018, 2019–20, 2020–21, 2021–22, 2023–24, 2024–25, 2025–26
- Supercopa de España Femenina: 2019–20, 2021–22, 2022–23, 2023–24, 2024–25
- Copa Catalunya: 2015, 2016, 2017, 2018, 2019
- UEFA Women's Champions League: 2020–21, 2022–23, 2023–24, 2025–26

Spain

- Algarve Cup: 2017
- Cyprus Cup: 2018
