= 2019 UEFA Women's Champions League final =

- Match programme cover
- Event: 2018–19 UEFA Women's Champions League
| Lyon | Barcelona |
| (France) | (Spain) |
| 4 | 1 |
- Date: 18 May 2019
- Venue: Groupama Arena, Budapest
- Player of the Match: Ada Hegerberg (Lyon)
- Referee: Anastasia Pustovoitova (Russia)
- Attendance: 19,487
- Weather: Sunny; 24 °C (75 °F); 46% humidity

The 2019 UEFA Women's Champions League final was the final match of the 2018–19 UEFA Women's Champions League, the 18th season of Europe's premier women's club football tournament organised by UEFA, and the 10th season since it was renamed from the UEFA Women's Cup to the UEFA Women's Champions League. This was the first time since the final is played as a single match that a host city for the Women's Champions League final was not automatically assigned by which city won the bid to host the men's Champions League final, although the same association is still allowed to host both finals by the UEFA bid regulations. It was played at the Groupama Arena in Budapest, Hungary on 18 May 2019, between French side Lyon and Spanish side Barcelona.

Lyon won the final 4–1 for their fourth consecutive and record-extending sixth overall UEFA Women's Champions League title.

== Teams ==
In the following table, finals until 2009 were in the UEFA Women's Cup era, since 2010 were in the UEFA Women's Champions League era.

| Team | Previous finals appearances (bold indicates winners) |
|---|---|
| (France) Lyon | 7 (2010, **2011**, **2012**, 2013, **2016**, **2017**, **2018**) |
| (Spain) Barcelona | None |

Lyon, which hold the record for most titles (five) and most consecutive titles (three), are the first team to reach eight finals and four consecutive finals. Barcelona were the first Spanish team to reach the final, and the first women's side whose men's team have also won the Champions League.

== Venue ==
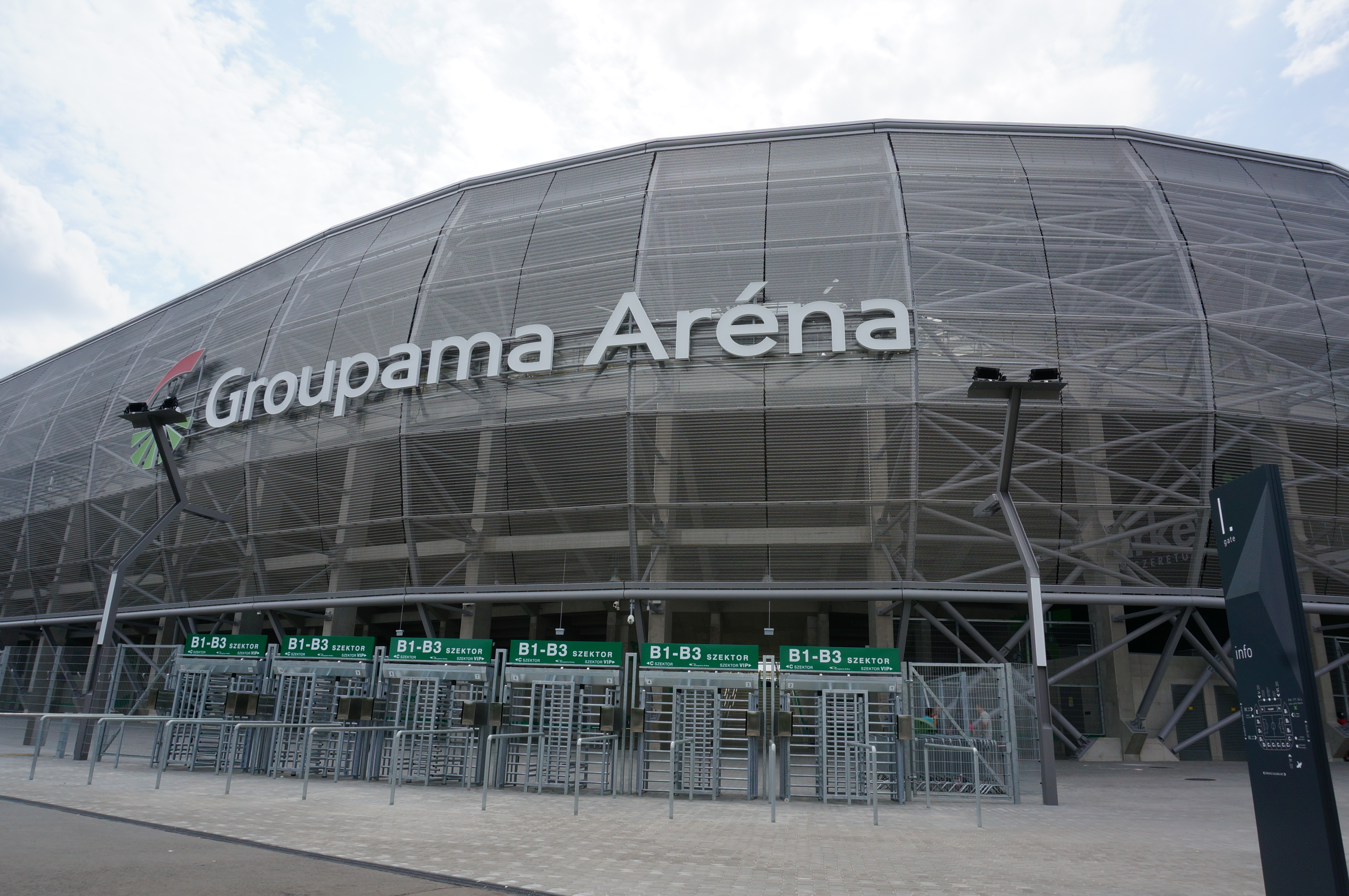
The Groupama Arena in Budapest hosted the final.

This is the first time a major international women's final is held in Hungary.

The stadium is the home ground of Hungarian club Ferencváros. Due to UEFA regulations regarding naming rights of non-tournament sponsors, the stadium was referred to as the "Ferencváros Stadium" in all UEFA materials.

=== Host selection ===
For the first time ever, an open bidding process was launched on 9 December 2016 by UEFA to select the venues of the club competition finals (UEFA Champions League, UEFA Europa League, UEFA Women's Champions League, and UEFA Super Cup). Associations had until 27 January 2017 to express interest, and bid dossiers must be submitted by 6 June 2017.

UEFA announced on 3 February 2017 that six associations expressed interest in hosting, and confirmed on 7 June 2017 that two associations submitted bids for the 2019 UEFA Women's Champions League Final:

Bidding associations for 2019 UEFA Women's Champions League Final
| Association | Stadium | City | Capacity | Notes |
|---|---|---|---|---|
| Hungary | Groupama Arena | Budapest | 23,689 | |
| Kazakhstan | Astana Arena | Astana | 30,244 | Also bid for 2019 UEFA Super Cup |

The following associations expressed interest in hosting but eventually did not submit bids:

- Czech Republic: Eden Arena, Prague
- Lithuania: Darius and Girėnas Stadium, Kaunas
- Scotland: Hampden Park, Glasgow
- Spain: Coliseum Alfonso Pérez, Getafe

The bid evaluation report was published by UEFA on 14 September 2017. The Groupama Arena was selected as the venue by the UEFA Executive Committee on 20 September 2017.

== Route to the final ==
Note: In all results below, the score of the finalist is given first (H: home; A: away).

| (France) Lyon | | | | Round | (Spain) Barcelona | | | |
|---|---|---|---|---|---|---|---|---|
| Opponent | Agg. | 1st leg | 2nd leg | Knockout phase | Opponent | Agg. | 1st leg | 2nd leg |
| (Norway) Avaldsnes | 7–0 | 2–0 (A) | 5–0 (H) | Round of 32 | (Kazakhstan) BIIK Kazygurt | 4–3 | 1–3 (A) | 3–0 (H) |
| (Netherlands) Ajax | 13–0 | 4–0 (A) | 9–0 (H) | Round of 16 | (Scotland) Glasgow City | 8–0 | 5–0 (H) | 3–0 (A) |
| (Germany) VfL Wolfsburg | 6–3 | 2–1 (H) | 4–2 (A) | Quarter-finals | (Norway) LSK Kvinner | 4–0 | 3–0 (H) | 1–0 (A) |
| (England) Chelsea | 3–2 | 2–1 (H) | 1–1 (A) | Semi-finals | (Germany) Bayern Munich | 2–0 | 1–0 (A) | 1–0 (H) |

== Pre-match ==
=== Ticketing ===
Tickets were available for sale for 1,000 HUF, 700 HUF, and 500 HUF.

== Match ==
=== Officials ===
On 1 May 2019, UEFA announced that Anastasia Pustovoitova of Russia would officiate the final. She was joined by Russian compatriot Ekaterina Kurochkina and Petruţa Iugulescu of Romania as assistant referees. The fourth official for the final was Hungarian Katalin Kulcsár, joined by fellow countrywoman Katalin Török as reserve official.

=== Details ===
The "home" team (for administrative purposes) was determined by an additional draw held after the quarter-final and semi-final draws, which was held on 9 November 2018, 13:00 CET, at the UEFA headquarters in Nyon, Switzerland.

18 May 2019
18:00 UTC+2

| Lyon (France) | 4–1 | (Spain) Barcelona |
|---|---|---|
| Marozsán 5'; Hegerberg 14', 19', 30' | Report | Oshoala 89' |

Groupama Arena, Budapest
Attendance: 19,487
Referee: Anastasia Pustovoitova (Russia)

| **Lyon** | **Barcelona** |

| GK | 16 | (France) Sarah Bouhaddi |
| RB | 2 | (England) Lucy Bronze |
| CB | 3 | (France) Wendie Renard (c) | (yellow card) 25' |
| CB | 29 | (France) Griedge Mbock Bathy |
| LB | 7 | (France) Amel Majri |
| CM | 24 | (Wales) Jess Fishlock | | (substituted off) 72' |
| CM | 6 | (France) Amandine Henry |
| CM | 10 | (Germany) Dzsenifer Marozsán |
| RW | 11 | (Netherlands) Shanice van de Sanden | | (substituted off) 63' |
| CF | 14 | (Norway) Ada Hegerberg | (yellow card) 16' |
| LW | 9 | (France) Eugénie Le Sommer | | (substituted off) 82' |
Substitutes:
| GK | 1 | (Germany) Lisa Weiß |
| DF | 4 | (France) Selma Bacha | | (substituted on) 82' |
| DF | 21 | (Canada) Kadeisha Buchanan |
| DF | 26 | (Germany) Carolin Simon |
| MF | 5 | (Japan) Saki Kumagai | | (substituted on) 72' |
| FW | 20 | (France) Delphine Cascarino | | (substituted on) 63' |
| FW | 25 | (Argentina) Sole Jaimes |
Manager:
(France) Reynald Pedros

| GK | 1 | (Spain) Sandra Paños |
| RB | 8 | (Spain) Marta Torrejón |
| CB | 17 | (Spain) Andrea Pereira | (substituted off) 81' |
| CB | 4 | (Spain) Mapi León |
| LB | 15 | (Spain) Leila Ouahabi |
| RM | 6 | (Spain) Vicky Losada (c) |
| CM | 14 | (Spain) Aitana Bonmatí | (substituted off) 69' |
| CM | 11 | (Spain) Alexia Putellas |
| LM | 9 | (Spain) Mariona Caldentey |
| CF | 22 | (Netherlands) Lieke Martens |
| CF | 16 | (England) Toni Duggan | (substituted off) 69' |
Substitutes:
| GK | 25 | (Spain) Gemma Font |
| DF | 3 | (Netherlands) Stefanie van der Gragt | (substituted on) 81' |
| DF | 5 | (Spain) Melanie Serrano |
| MF | 10 | (Brazil) Andressa Alves | (substituted on) 69' |
| MF | 12 | (Spain) Patricia Guijarro |
| FW | 20 | (Nigeria) Asisat Oshoala | (substituted on) 69' |
| FW | 21 | (North Macedonia) Nataša Andonova |
Manager:
(Spain) Lluís Cortés

Player of the Match:
Ada Hegerberg (Lyon)

Assistant referees:
Ekaterina Kurochkina (Russia)
Petruţa Iugulescu (Romania)
Fourth official:
Katalin Kulcsár (Hungary)
Reserve official:
Katalin Török (Hungary)

**Match rules**

- 90 minutes.
- 30 minutes of extra time if necessary.
- Penalty shoot-out if scores still level.
- Seven named substitutes.
- Maximum of three substitutions, with a fourth allowed in extra time.

=== Statistics ===
| Statistic | Lyon | Barcelona |
|---|---|---|
| Goals scored | 4 | 1 |
| Total shots | 19 | 10 |
| Shots on target | 11 | 2 |
| Saves | 1 | 7 |
| Ball possession | 53% | 47% |
| Corner kicks | 3 | 2 |
| Fouls committed | 8 | 8 |
| Offsides | 6 | 6 |
| Yellow cards | 2 | 0 |
| Red cards | 0 | 0 |

== See also ==
- 2018–19 Olympique Lyonnais Féminin season
- 2018–19 FC Barcelona Femení season
- 2019 UEFA Champions League Final
- 2019 UEFA Europa League Final
- 2019 UEFA Super Cup
- Played between same clubs:
- 2022 UEFA Women's Champions League final
- 2024 UEFA Women's Champions League final
