= Kheira Hamraoui =

French footballer (born 1990)

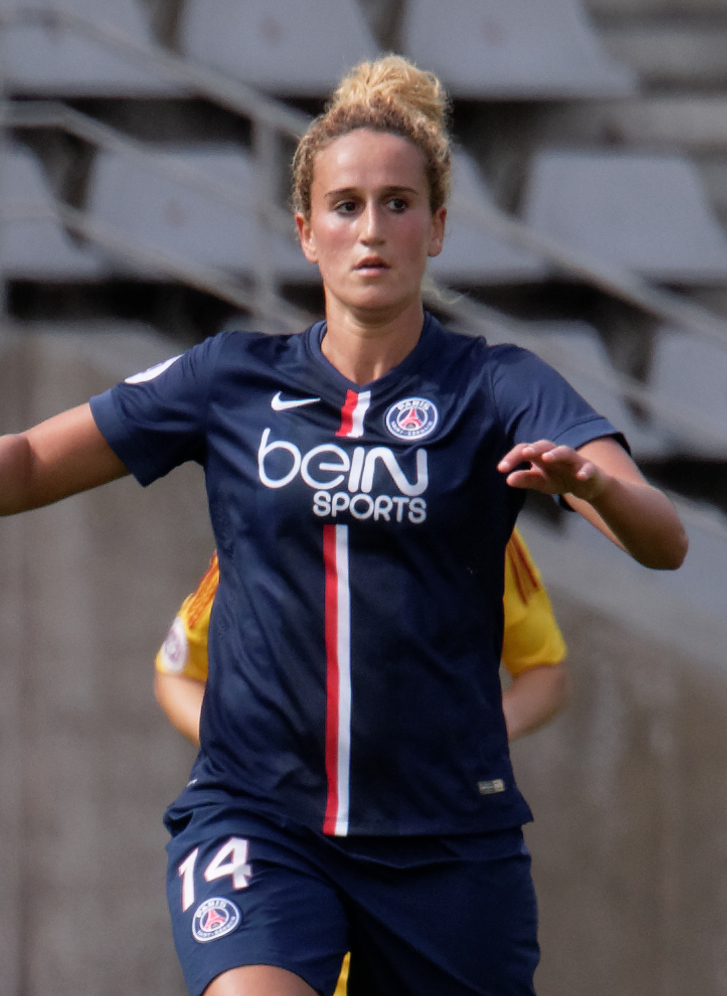
- Hamraoui with Paris Saint-Germain in 2015

Personal information
- Date of birth: 13 January 1990 (age 36)
- Place of birth: Croix, France
- Height: 1.78 m (5 ft 10 in)
- Position: Attacking midfielder

Youth career
- 1999–2004: Roubaix
- 2004–2006: Leers

Senior career*
Years	Team	Apps	(Gls)
2006–2007	Clairefontaine	11	(1)
2007–2008	Hénin-Beaumont	15	(5)
2008–2012	Saint-Étienne	74	(30)
2012–2016	Paris Saint-Germain	67	(10)
2016–2018	Lyon	28	(7)
2018–2021	Barcelona	66	(6)
2021–2023	Paris Saint-Germain	27	(0)
2023	América	11	(0)
2024–2025	Al-Shabab	14	(7)
2025–2026	Al Hilal	13	(3)

International career
2006	France U17	8	(0)
2008–2009	France U19	9	(4)
2008	France U20	6	(1)
2012–2023	France	41	(3)
- * Club domestic league appearances and goals as of 21 May 2023

Kheira Hamraoui (born 13 January 1990) is a French professional footballer who plays as a midfielder.

== Club career ==
=== Youth career ===
Hamraoui began her football career with Clairefontaine, a renowned football academy for female French youth players.

=== Division 1 Féminine ===
Hamraoui has played the majority of her career in the Division 1 Féminine, for clubs including Hénin-Beaumont, Saint-Étienne, and PSG. At Saint-Étienne, she was a crucial part of the club's first and only major title win, the 2011 Challenge de France.

Hamraoui signed for Lyon from PSG in 2016 after spending four years with the club. It was here that she won two continental trebles by winning the Champions League twice, winning the Coupe de France Féminine twice, and finishing first in the Division 1 Féminine for two consecutive seasons. In June 2018, she announced her departure from the French league and that she was looking for a new opportunity abroad.

=== 2018–21: Barcelona ===
She left Lyon in 2018 to sign a two-year contract with Barcelona, her first club venture outside of France.

In her first season with the club, she helped them progress to the semifinals of the UEFA Women's Champions League for the first time. They played Bayern, and Hamraoui bagged an important away goal in the first leg with a low shot to the bottom left corner. In the return leg at the Mini Estadi, Barcelona increased their aggregate score after a goal scored from a penalty, but Hamraoui found herself getting sent off after receiving a second yellow card. Barcelona won 2–0 on aggregate to advance to their first ever UWCL final, but Hamraoui was suspended and was not able to play against her former club. Lyon won the final 4–1.

In her last season with the club, she won the historic treble of Primera División, Champions League and Copa de la Reina.

On 24 June 2021, she announced she was leaving Barcelona, stating on Twitter that "I've reached ALL my objectives with Barcelona... My mission here is over. A new adventure begins."

=== 2021–2023: Return to Paris Saint-Germain ===
On 15 July, Hamraoui signed a two-year deal with Paris Saint-Germain.

In June 2023 she left PSG as a free agent after her contract ended.

=== 2023: Club America ===
in late 2023, Hamraoui signed and played for Club America for the second half of the season.

=== 2024: Al-Shabab FC (Saudi Arabia) ===
On 22 August 2024, Al-Shabab signed Hamraoui to play in the Saudi Women's Premier League.

== International career ==
In October 2012 Hamraoui made her debut for the France national team in a friendly game against England.

She was part of the France squad at the 2015 FIFA Women's World Cup and the 2016 Olympics.

Hamraoui has not received a national team call-up since April 2019 and was not selected to the France squad at the 2019 FIFA Women's World Cup.

== Assault incident ==
On 4 November 2021, Hamraoui was assaulted in the street after two masked men dragged her from a club-issued car, assaulting her with iron bars. Her teammate Aminata Diallo, who was driving the car, was arrested following the incident; she was later released from police custody without any charges. During the attack, the masked men who assaulted Hamraoui were reported to have said "so like that, [you] sleep with married men?" On 19 November, Eric Abidal's wife Hayet announced that she had filed for divorce after it came to light that he was having an affair with Hamraoui. However, after further investigation, Diallo was re-arrested in September 2022 on charges of serious bodily harm.

== Career statistics ==
=== International ===
As of 18 February 2023

Appearances and goals by national team and year
National team	Year	Apps	Goals
France	2012	1	0
France	2013	0	0
France	2014	10	0
France	2015	12	0
France	2016	12	3
France	2017	0	0
France	2018	0	0
France	2019	1	0
France	2020	0	0
France	2021	0	0
France	2022	3	0
France	2023	2	0
Total		41	3

Scores and results list France's goal tally first, score column indicates score after each Hamraoui goal.

List of international goals scored by Kheira Hamraoui
No.	Date	Venue	Opponent	Score	Result	Competition
1	11 April 2016	Stade du Hainaut, Valenciennes, France	Ukraine	1–0	4–0	2017 UEFA Women's Euro qualification
2	30 September 2016	Stade Sébastien Charléty, Paris, France	Albania	2–0	6–0	2017 UEFA Women's Euro qualification
3	30 September 2016	Stade Sébastien Charléty, Paris, France	Albania	4–0	6–0	2017 UEFA Women's Euro qualification

== Honours ==
Saint-Étienne

- Coupe de France Féminine: 2011

Paris Saint-Germain

- Coupe de France Féminine: runners-up, 2014

Lyon

- Division 1 Féminine: 2016–17, 2017–18
- UEFA Women's Champions League: 2016–17, 2017–18
- Coupe de France Féminine: 2017

Barcelona

- Primera División: 2019–20, 2020–21
- UEFA Women's Champions League: 2020–21, runners-up: 2018–19
- Copa de la Reina: 2020, 2021
- Supercopa de España Femenina: 2020
- Copa Catalunya: 2019

France

- Cyprus Cup: 2014

Individual

- UEFA Women's Champions League Squad of the Season: 2019–20
