= Anastasia Pustovoitova =

Russian association football player

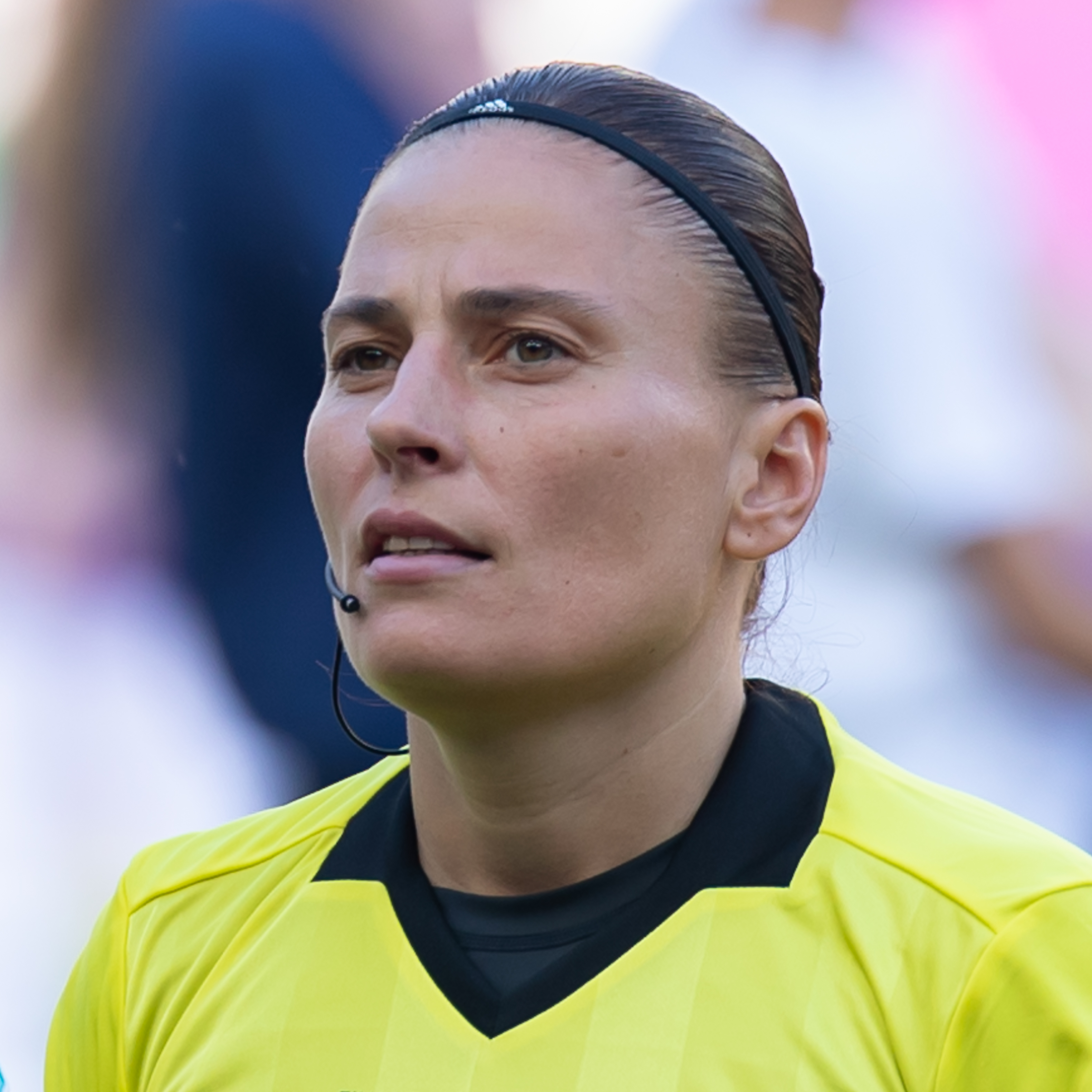

Personal information
- Full name: Anastasia Vyacheslavovna Pustovoitova
- Date of birth: 10 February 1981 (age 45)
- Place of birth: Jeseník, Czechoslovakia
- Position: Defender

Senior career*
Years	Team	Apps	(Gls)
- FC Ryazan

International career
	Russia	2	(0)
Refereeing career
International
Years	League	Role
2009–	FIFA listed	Referee
- * Club domestic league appearances and goals

Anastasia Vyacheslavovna Pustovoitova (Russian: Анастасия Вячеславовна Пустовойтова; born 10 February 1981) is a Russian association football referee. She previously played as a defender on the Russian women's international football team.

== Playing career ==
Pustovoitova was a member of the Russia women's national football team and the club Ryazan as a defender. She was part of the team at the 2003 FIFA Women's World Cup.

== Refereeing career ==
Pustovoitova became a FIFA listed referee in 2009. She was appointed to be an official at the UEFA Women's Euro 2017 in the Netherlands.

On 3 December 2018, it was announced that Pustovoitova had been appointed to be a referee for the 2019 FIFA Women's World Cup in France. After the conclusion of the round of 16, FIFA announced that Pustovoitova was selected as one of 11 referees who would be assigned to the final phases of the tournament.

In April 2019, she was featured on the YouTube channel "Krasava", which is run by former footballer Yevgeny Savin.

In May 2019, Pustovoitova was appointed to officiate the 2019 UEFA Women's Champions League Final between Olympique Lyonnais and FC Barcelona in Budapest.

In August 2021, Pustovoitova was appointed to the Sweden-Canada gold medal match at the COVID-delayed 2020 Summer Olympics.
