= 2019–20 Supercopa de España Femenina =

Tournament details
- Host country: Spain
- City: Salamanca
- Dates: 5–9 February 2020
- Teams: 4

Final positions
- Champions: Barcelona (1st title)
- Runners-up: Real Sociedad

Tournament statistics
- Matches played: 3
- Goals scored: 17 (5.67 per match)
- Attendance: 19,538 (6,513 per match)
- Top scorer(s): Marta Torrejón (4 goals)
- Best player: Marta Torrejón (Barcelona)

The 2019–20 Supercopa de España Femenina was the first edition of the Supercopa de España Femenina, an annual women's football competition for clubs in the Spanish football league system that were successful in its major competitions in the preceding season.

In December 2019, it was announced that the competition would be created with a four-team format, which would include a semi-final round, similar to the new format established for the men's tournament. On 10 January 2020, the Royal Spanish Football Federation announced that the tournament would be played in Salamanca.

== Qualification ==
The tournament featured both finalists from the 2018–19 Copa de la Reina and the remaining highest ranked teams from the 2018–19 Primera División that had not already qualified through the cup final.

=== Qualified teams ===
The following four teams qualified for the tournament.

Team	Method of qualification
Atlético Madrid	2018–19 Primera División champions and 2018–19 Copa de la Reina runners-up
Barcelona	2018–19 Primera División runners-up
Levante	2018–19 Primera División third place
Real Sociedad	2018–19 Copa de la Reina winners

== Draw ==
The draw was held on 16 January 2020 in Salamanca, without restrictions in it.

== Matches ==
All three matches were held at the Helmántico Stadium in Villares de la Reina, Salamanca.

=== Bracket ===
Semi-finals
5 February 2020
Real Sociedad	1
Levante	0
6 February 2020
Atlético Madrid	2
Barcelona	3

Final
9 February 2020
Real Sociedad	1
Barcelona	10

=== Semi-finals ===
5 February 2020
20:00

Real Sociedad	1–0	Levante
Baños 17'	Report

Helmántico Stadium, Villares de la Reina
Attendance: 3,244
Referee: Ainara Andrea Acevedo Dudley
6 February 2020
20:00

Atlético Madrid	2–3	Barcelona
Duggan 4'; Corral 62'	Report	Guijarro 12'; Martens 28'; Oshoala 43'

Helmántico Stadium, Villares de la Reina
Attendance: 7,077
Referee: María Dolores Martínez Madrona

=== Final ===
9 February 2020
12:00

Real Sociedad	1–10	Barcelona
Manu 63'	Report	Torrejón 5', 33', 56', 78'; Putellas 7', 44'; Oshoala 35', 51'; Hansen 37'; Andújar 75'

Helmántico Stadium, Villares de la Reina
Attendance: 9,217
Referee: Marta Huerta de Aza

Real Sociedad	Barcelona

GK	1	(Spain) María Asunción Quiñones
DF	18	(Spain) Lucía Rodríguez	(yellow card) 80'
DF	19	(Spain) Núria Mendoza
DF	6	(Spain) Ane Etxezarreta
DF	2	(Spain) Iraia Iparragirre
MF	11	(Spain) Marta Cardona
MF	8	(Spain) Itxaso Uriarte		(substituted off) 46'
MF	3	(Spain) Ana Tejada
MF	14	(Spain) Leire Baños		(substituted off) 64'
FW	17	(Spain) Bárbara Latorre		(substituted off) 22'
FW	7	(Spain) Nahikari García		(substituted off) 60'
Substitutes:
GK	26	(Spain) Adriana Nanclares
DF	5	(Spain) Maddi Torre		(substituted on) 46'
MF	4	(Spain) Sara Olaizola		(substituted on) 64'
MF	10	(Spain) Nerea Eizaguirre		(substituted on) 22'
FW	12	(Spain) Manu Lareo		(substituted on) 60'
DF	15	(Spain) Clau Blanco
FW	24	(Spain) Cecilia Marcos
Manager:
(Spain) Gonzalo Arconada

GK	1	(Spain) Sandra Paños
DF	15	(Spain) Leila Ouahabi	(substituted off) 26'
DF	4	(Spain) Mapi León
DF	17	(Spain) Andrea Pereira
DF	8	(Spain) Marta Torrejón
MF	12	(Spain) Patri Guijarro	(substituted off) 56'
MF	11	(Spain) Alexia Putellas
MF	9	(Spain) Mariona Caldentey	(substituted off) 56'
MF	16	(Norway) Caroline Graham Hansen	(substituted off) 56'
FW	22	(Netherlands) Lieke Martens
FW	20	(Nigeria) Asisat Oshoala
Substitutes:
GK	13	(Mexico) Pamela Tajonar
DF	3	(Netherlands) Stefanie van der Gragt
MF	6	(Spain) Vicky Losada	(substituted on) 56'
FW	7	(Spain) Jennifer Hermoso
MF	14	(Spain) Aitana Bonmatí	(substituted on) 56'
DF	18	(Switzerland) Ana-Maria Crnogorčević	(substituted on) 26'
FW	19	(Spain) Candela Andújar	(substituted on) 56'
Manager:
(Spain) Lluís Cortés

== See also ==
- 2019–20 Primera División (women)
- 2019–20 Copa de la Reina
