= Basque Country women's national football team =

(Basque Country (autonomous community)) Basque Country
- Association: Euskadiko Futbol Federakundea
- Head coach: Juanjo Arregi
- Captain: Irene Paredes
- Most caps: Sandra Ramajo (8)
- Top scorer: Naiara Beristain (3)
First colours	Second colours

First international
- Basque Country 2–4 Argentina (Irun, Spain; 2 September 2006)

Biggest win
- Estonia 0–5 Basque Country (Tallinn, Estonia; 23 May 2015)

Biggest defeat
- Basque Country 2–4 Argentina (Irun, Spain; 2 September 2006); Argentina 4–2 Basque Country (Buenos Aires, Argentina; 6 April 2007)

The Basque Country women's football team (officially, in Basque, Euskal Herriko emakumezkoen futbol selekzioa) is considered the national team of the Basque Country greater region. It is organised by the Basque Football Federation (Euskadiko Futbol Federakundea). It is not affiliated with FIFA or UEFA and therefore it is only allowed to play friendly matches.

== Results and fixtures ==
Legend

Win Draw Lose Fixture

2 September 2006	Basque Country	2–4	Argentina	Irun
18:15	del Ama 33'; Azagra 45'	Report	Gómez 20', 85' (pen.); Ferretti 66'; Potassa 70'	Stadium: Stadium Gal; Referee: Pérez Lasa

6 April 2007	Argentina	4–2	Basque Country	Buenos Aires
16:00	Potassa 12'; Ojeda 17'; Coronel 60'; Vallejos 85'	Report	Rodríguez 63'; Ferreira 75'	Stadium: Estadio Juan Pasquale

21 June 2008	Basque Country	2–1	Chile under-20	Irun
	Nekane Díez 63'; Iturregi 85'		Quezada 46'	Stadium: Stadium Gal; Referee: Bikandi Garrido

23 June 2012	Basque Country	1–0	Slovakia	San Sebastián
16:30	Orueta 8'	Report		Stadium: Anoeta; Attendance: 7,000

10 May 2014	Basque Country	2–0	Republic of Ireland	Azpeitia
	Beristain 13', 39'	Report		Stadium: Garmendipe; Attendance: 1,500

27 December 2014 Centenary Trophy	Basque Country	1–1	Catalonia	Barakaldo
18:30	Díaz Cirauqui 18'	Report	Olga García 6'	Stadium: Lasesarre; Attendance: 2,000; Referee: Carlos Arriola

23 May 2015	Estonia	0–5	Basque Country	Tallinn
14:00			Arraiza 2', 6'; Díez 11'; Encinas 35', 71'	Stadium: Le Coq Arena

26 December 2015 Centenary Trophy	Catalonia	1–1 (3–4 p)	Basque Country	Barcelona
18:45	Corredera 90+1'	Report	75' Beristain	Stadium: Mini Estadi; Attendance: 4,106; Referee: Rebollo López
	Penalties
	Serna (penalty missed); Putellas (penalty scored); Mendoza (penalty scored); Corredera (penalty scored); Carreras (penalty missed)		(penalty scored) Beristain; (penalty scored) Lareo; (penalty scored) Corres; (penalty scored) Baños

26 November 2016	Republic of Ireland	2–1	Basque Country	Dublin
15:30	Roche 26'; Kiernan 52'	Report	Corres 33'	Stadium: Tallaght Stadium; Referee: Paula Brady

25 November 2017	Basque Country	2–1	Czech Republic	Eibar
17:00	Vázquez 8'; Nahikari 49'	Report	Bartoňová 66'	Stadium: Ipurua; Attendance: 1,800; Referee: Beatriz Arregui

21 February 2021	Czech Republic	canceled ^{COV}	Basque Country	Prague

11 April 2021 Basque County International Women's Cup	Basque Country XI	1–0	Argentina XI	San Sebastián
12:10	Corres 4'			Stadium: Campo José Luis Orbegozo; Referee: Beatriz Arregui

11 April 2021 Basque County International Women's Cup	Basque Country XI	0–0	Venezuela XI	San Sebastián
13:20				Stadium: Campo José Luis Orbegozo; Referee: Olatz Rivera

20 December 2022 Friendly	Basque Country	3–0	Chile	Vitoria-Gasteiz
19:00 UTC+1	Eizagirre 41'; Sarriegi 70'; Martínez de Lahidalga 84'	Report		Stadium: Mendizorrotza; Attendance: 2,410

== Coaching staff ==
=== Current coaching staff ===
Position	Name
Head coach	(Basque Country (autonomous community)) Juanjo Arregi
Assistant coach	(Basque Country (autonomous community)) Ainhoa Tirapu
Assistant coach	(Basque Country (autonomous community)) Andrea Leguina
Fitness coach	June Mendizabal
Doctor	Arrate Orueta
Physiotherapist	Olatz Fernández; Itziar Muriel
Delegate	Sandra Ramajo

=== Manager history ===
As of 21 December 2022

Manager	From	To	Record							
Manager	From	To	G	W	D	L	GF	GA	GD	Win %
(Basque Country (autonomous community)) Sebastián Martija	2006	2007	2	0	0	2	4	8	−4	0.00
(Basque Country (autonomous community)) Arantza del Puerto	2008	2008	1	1	0	0	2	1	+1	100.00
(Basque Country (autonomous community)) Iñigo Juaristi and (Basque Country (autonomous community)) Garbiñe Etxeberria	2012	2012	1	1	0	0	1	0	+1	100.00
(Basque Country (autonomous community)) José Álvarez and (Basque Country (autonomous community)) Sergio Rivera	2014	June 2015	3	2	1	0	8	1	+7	66.67
(Basque Country (autonomous community)) Juan José Arregi	September 2015	December 2016	2	0	1	1	2	3	−1	0.00
(Basque Country (autonomous community)) Iñigo Juaristi	25 October 2017	June 2022	1	1	0	0	2	1	+1	100.00
(Basque Country (autonomous community)) Juanjo Arregi	December 2022	current	1	1	0	0	3	0	+3	100.00
Total			11	6	2	3	22	14	+8	54.55

== Players ==
=== Current squad ===
The following players were called up for the Friendly match against Chile on 20 December 2022.

Caps and goals as of 21 December 2022

No.	Pos.	Player	Date of birth (age)	Caps	Goals	Club
Goalkeeper
1	GK	Amaia Peña	2 November 1998 (age 28)	1	0	(Basque Country (autonomous community)) Athletic Club
13	GK	Maitane Zalba	15 January 2000 (age 26)	1	0	unattached
Defender
2	DF	Iraia Iparragirre	9 July 1995 (age 31)	1	0	retired
3	DF	Nerea Nevado	27 April 2001 (age 25)	1	0	(Basque Country (autonomous community)) Athletic Club
4	DF	Itziar Gastearena	4 May 1993 (age 33)	2	0	(Basque Country (autonomous community)) Alavés
5	DF	Irati Urruzola	3 January 2000 (age 26)	1	0	unattached
12	DF	Arene Altonaga	25 February 1993 (age 33)	1	0	(Basque Country (autonomous community)) Eibar
14	DF	Leire Baños	29 November 1996 (age 29)	5	0	(Basque Country (autonomous community)) Athletic Bilbao
Midfielder
6	MF	Ane Etxezarreta	24 August 1995 (age 31)	1	0	(Basque Country (autonomous community)) Eibar
8	MF	Jone Ibañez	22 July 1997 (age 29)	1	0	unattached
10	MF	Nerea Eizagirre	4 January 2000 (age 26)	1	1	(Basque Country (autonomous community)) Real Sociedad
16	MF	Maite Zubieta	28 May 2004 (age 22)	1	0	(Basque Country (autonomous community)) Athletic Club
17	MF	Patricia Zugasti	7 August 2000 (age 26)	1	0	(Basque Country (autonomous community)) Athletic Bilbao
Forward
7	FW	Amaiur Sarriegi	13 December 2000 (age 25)	1	1	(Community of Madrid) Atlético Madrid
9	FW	Marta San Adrián	22 February 2000 (age 26)	1	0	(Basque Country (autonomous community)) Alavés
11	FW	Cecilia Marcos	3 November 2001 (age 24)	1	0	(Basque Country (autonomous community)) Real Sociedad
15	FW	Ane Miren Martínez de Lahidalga	5 September 1992 (age 34)	1	1	retired
18	FW	Maitane Vilariño	30 June 2002 (age 24)	1	0	(Basque Country (autonomous community)) Athletic Bilbao

=== Recent call-ups ===
The following players have played for a team in the last calls.

Pos.	Player	Date of birth (age)	Caps	Goals	Club	Latest call-up
GK	Andrea de la Nava	11 February 1994 (age 32)	1	0	retired	Basque County International Women's Cup 2021
GK	María Asunción Quiñones	29 October 1996 (age 30)	2	0	(Turkey) ABB Fomget	v.Czech Republic; 25 November 2017
GK	Ainhoa Tirapu	4 September 1984 (age 42)	6	0	retired	v.Czech Republic; 25 November 2017
DF	Nerea Abancens	31 May 1987 (age 39)	0	0	retired	Basque County International Women's Cup 2021
DF	Eunate Arraiza	3 June 1991 (age 35)	2	2	(Navarre) Osasuna	Basque County International Women's Cup 2021
DF	María Díaz Cirauqui	5 May 1995 (age 31)	3	1	(France) Dijon	Basque County International Women's Cup 2021
DF	Naroa Uriarte	5 February 2001 (age 25)	0	0	(Basque Country (autonomous community)) Athletic Club	Basque County International Women's Cup 2021
DF	Ainhoa Vicente	20 August 1995 (age 31)	4	0	(Basque Country (autonomous community)) Real sociedad	Basque County International Women's Cup 2021
DF	Ane Bergara	3 February 1987 (age 39)	7	0	retired	v.Czech Republic; 25 November 2017
DF	Vanesa Gimbert	19 April 1980 (age 46)	5	0	retired	v.Czech Republic; 25 November 2017
DF	Sandra Ramajo	17 August 1987 (age 39)	8	0	retired	v.Czech Republic; 25 November 2017
DF	Garazi Murua	24 January 1995 (age 31)	2	0	retired	v.Czech Republic; 25 November 2017^{PRE}
MF	Sheila Elorza	8 June 1996 (age 30)	0	0	(Asturias) Real Oviedo	Basque County International Women's Cup 2021
MF	Sophie Istillart	23 April 1996 (age 30)	0	0	retired	Basque County International Women's Cup 2021
MF	Maite Oroz	25 March 1998 (age 28)	1	0	(England) Tottenham Hotspur	Basque County International Women's Cup 2021
MF	Marta Perea	24 November 1995 (age 30)	0	0	retired	Basque County International Women's Cup 2021
MF	Itxaso Uriarte	1 September 1991 (age 35)	1	0	(Basque Country (autonomous community)) Athletic Club	Basque County International Women's Cup 2021
MF	Oihane Valdezate	10 April 2000 (age 26)	0	0	(Italy) AS Roma	Basque County International Women's Cup 2021
MF	Naiara Beristain	4 January 1992 (age 34)	5	3	retired	v.Czech Republic; 25 November 2017
MF	Damaris Egurrola	26 August 1999 (age 27)	1	0	(France) Olympique Lyonnais	v.Czech Republic; 25 November 2017
MF	Joana Flaviano	15 February 1990 (age 36)	1	0	retired	v.Czech Republic; 25 November 2017
MF	Marta Unzué	4 July 1988 (age 38)	5	0	retired	v.Czech Republic; 25 November 2017
FW	Ane Azkona	15 July 1998 (age 28)	0	0	(Basque Country (autonomous community)) Athletic Club	Basque County International Women's Cup 2021
FW	Ainize Barea	25 January 1992 (age 34)	0	0	(Basque Country (autonomous community)) Athletic Club	Basque County International Women's Cup 2021
FW	Yulema Corres (c)	7 March 1992 (age 34)	5	1	retired	Basque County International Women's Cup 2021
FW	Nekane Díez	13 August 1991 (age 35)	7	2	retired	v.Czech Republic; 25 November 2017
FW	Nahikari García	10 March 1997 (age 29)	3	1	(Basque Country (autonomous community)) Athletic Club	v.Czech Republic; 25 November 2017
FW	Manuela Lareo	29 May 1992 (age 34)	3	0	retired	v.Czech Republic; 25 November 2017
FW	Erika Vázquez	16 February 1983 (age 43)	5	1	retired	v.Czech Republic; 25 November 2017

=== Notable players ===
Basque players who represented FIFA international teams.

- Aiara Agirrezabala
- Nagore Alberdi
- Idoia Álvarez
- Angeles Arizeta
- Eunate Arraiza
- Eli Artola
- Uxue Astiz
- Ana María Astobieta
- Eunate Astralaga
- María Paz Azagra
- Ane Azkona
- Ainhoa Bakero
- Ixiar Bakero
- Miren Agurtzane Berdegue
- Ane Bergara
- Camino Berrozpe
- Itziar Canellada
- Elixabete Capa
- Maider Castillo
- Palmira Chivite
- Damaris Egurrola
- Nerea Eizagirre
- Miriam Erkizia
- Gurutze Fernández
- Eba Ferreira
- Joana Flaviano
- Sorkunde Garate
- Beatriz García
- Lucía García
- Nahikari García
- María Ángeles Gil
- Vanesa Gimbert
- Arrate Gisasola
- Arantxa Gómez
- Arantza Gondra
- Mónica "Gelo" González
- Itziar Gurrutxaga
- Oihane Hernández
- Elixabet Ibarra
- Arantza Iradi
- Begoña Iriarte
- Iraia Iturregi
- Begoña Jauregi
- Aitziber Juaristi
- Paula Kasares
- Leire Landa
- Manuela Lareo
- María Pilar Legarra
- Elene Lete
- Maitane López
- Tamara López
- Yolanda Mateos
- Amaia Mendióroz
- Carolina Miranda
- Marta Moreno
- Maite Muguruza
- Irune Murua
- Lydia Muruzabal
- Amaia Olabarrieta
- Maite Oroz
- Lierni Oyaga
- Marta Ozkoidi
- Laura Pardo
- Irene Paredes
- Virginia Pérez
- Clara Pinedo
- Ana Isabel Pozo
- Arantza del Puerto
- Elena Quevedo
- María Asunción Quiñones
- Vanessa Rodríguez
- Ana Ruiz
- Mariatxi Sánchez
- Idoia Sarasa
- Amaiur Sarriegi
- Bibiane Schulze
- Natalia Seijo
- Ainhoa Tirapu
- Nerea Urkola
- Erika Vázquez
- Ainhoa Vicente
- Maite Zubieta
- Nuria Zufia

Álava (1)	Biscay (20)	Gipuzkoa (38)	Labourd	Lower Navarre	Navarre (24)	Soule

== See also ==
- Football in the Basque Country
- Basque Country men's national football team
