= 2019–20 Copa de la Reina de Fútbol =

Tournament details
- Country: Spain
- Teams: 16

Final positions
- Champions: Barcelona
- Runners-up: EDF Logroño

The 2019–20 Copa de la Reina de Fútbol was the 38th edition of the Spanish women's association football national cup.

== Format changes ==
The format did not change from the previous season, as it is contested by all Primera División teams.

The calendar was defined on 13 December 2019.

== Schedule and format ==
Round	Draw date	Date	Fixtures	Clubs	Format details
Round of 16	24 Jan 2020	11–12 Feb 2020	8	16 → 8	New entries: Clubs participating in Primera División gain entry. Opponents seeding: Teams playing the 2019–20 UEFA Women's Champions League could not face each other. Local team seeding: Luck of the draw. Knock-out tournament type: Single match.
Quarter-finals	14 Feb 2020	25–26 Feb 2020	4	8 → 4	Opponents seeding: Luck of the draw. Local team seeding: Teams that played the round of 16 away. If both played it away, luck of the draw. Knock-out tournament type: Single match.
Semi-finals	28 Feb 2020	~~17–18 Mar 2020~~; 7–8 Oct 2020	2	4 → 2	Opponents seeding: Luck of the draw. Local team seeding: Luck of the draw. Knock-out tournament type: Single match.
Final	28 Feb 2020	~~31 May 2020~~; 13 Feb 2021	1	2 → 1	Single match at a La Rosaleda Stadium, Málaga.

Notes

- Single-match rounds ending in a tie will be decided in extra time; and if it persists, by a penalty shootout.

== Bracket ==
Round of 16
12 February
Sporting de Huelva	0
Barcelona	4
11 February
Deportivo La Coruña	7
Valencia	2
12 February
Real Sociedad	0 (2)
Madrid CFF (p)	0 (4)
11 February
Sevilla	3
Levante	0
11 February
Espanyol	0
EDF Logroño	2
12 February
Betis (p)	0 (4)
Atlético de Madrid	0 (2)
11 February
Athletic Club (a.e.t.)	3
Granadilla	0
11 February
Tacón	1
Rayo Vallecano	0

Quarter-finals
26 February
Barcelona (a.e.t.)	1
Deportivo La Coruña	0
26 February
Madrid CFF	0
Sevilla	3
26 February
EDF Logroño	1
Betis	0
26 February
Athletic Club	2
Tacón	1

Semi-finals
8 October
Barcelona	6
Sevilla	0
7 October
EDF Logroño (p)	0 (3)
Athletic Club	0 (1)

Final
13 February
Barcelona	3
EDF Logroño	0

== Round of 16 ==
=== Draw ===
Pot 1; 2 teams playing in the Champions League	Pot 2; 14 teams of Primera División
Atlético de Madrid; Barcelona	Athletic Club; Deportivo La Coruña; Espanyol; Granadilla; Levante; EDF Logroño; Madrid CFF; Rayo Vallecano; Betis; Real Sociedad; Sevilla; Sporting de Huelva; Tacón; Valencia

=== Matches ===
11 February 2020	Tacón	1–0	Rayo Vallecano	Madrid
16:00	Martínez 45'	Report		Stadium: Ciudad Real Madrid; Referee: Marta Frías Acedo

11 February 2020	Espanyol	0–2	EDF Logroño	Sant Adrià de Besós
16:00		Report	Carol 34', 40'	Stadium: Dani Jarque; Referee: Amy Peñalver Pearce

11 February 2020	Athletic Club	3–0 (a.e.t.)	Granadilla	Bilbao
19:00	Garazi 108' (pen.); Lucía García 116'; Gimbert 120'	Report		Stadium: Lezama; Referee: Sara Fernández Ceferino

11 February 2020	Sevilla	3–0	Levante	Seville
19:30	Nagore 13'; Karpova 17'; Zdunek 51'	Report		Stadium: Jesús Navas; Attendance: 514; Referee: Contreras Patiño

11 February 2020	Deportivo La Coruña	7–2	Valencia	A Coruña
20:00	Athenea 5'; Peke 15', 32', 59', 71'; Tere 82'; María Méndez 90+3'	Report	Paula 18'; Mari Paz 48'	Stadium: Abanca Riazor; Attendance: 7,569; Referee: Acevedo Dudley

12 February 2020	Sporting de Huelva	0–4	Barcelona	Huelva
16:30		Report	Oshoala 43', 71'; Hermoso 48'; Hansen 67'	Stadium: La Orden; Referee: Romero Navarro

12 February 2020	Real Sociedad	0–0 (a.e.t.) (2–4 p)	Madrid CFF	San Sebastián
18:00		Report		Stadium: Zubieta; Referee: Peláez Arnillas
	Penalties
	Baños (penalty missed); Mendoza (penalty scored); Palacios (penalty missed); Tejada (penalty scored)		(penalty scored) Chikwelu; (penalty scored) Yasmin; (penalty scored) Anama; (penalty scored) Frisbie

12 February 2020	Betis	0–0 (a.e.t.) (4–2 p)	Atlético de Madrid	Seville
18:30		Report		Stadium: Luis del Sol; Referee: Arregui Gamir
	Penalties
	L. González (penalty scored); Van Dongen (penalty scored); Piemonte (penalty scored); A. González (penalty scored)		(penalty missed) Santos; (penalty missed) Olga; (penalty scored) Corral; (penalty scored) Robles

== Quarterfinals ==
26 February 2020	Madrid CFF	0–3	Sevilla	San Sebastián de los Reyes
17:00			Maite 7'; Karpova 73'; Echeverri 88'	Stadium: Nuevo Matapiñonera; Referee: Arregui Gamir

26 February 2020	EDF Logroño	1–0	Betis	Logroño
18:30	Boho 67'	Report		Stadium: Las Gaunas; Referee: Contreras Patiño

26 February 2020	Athletic Club	2–1	Tacón	Bilbao
19:00	Garazi 33' (pen.), 65' (pen.)	Report	Martínez 45+2'	Stadium: San Mamés; Attendance: 10,991; Referee: González González

26 February 2020	Barcelona	1–0 (a.e.t.)	Deportivo La Coruña	Sant Joan Despí
19:00	Hamroui 120'	Report		Stadium: Johan Cruyff; Attendance: 1,169; Referee: Rivera Olmedo

== Semifinals ==
The semi-finals were originally slated to be played on 17 and 18 March 2020 but were suspended due to the COVID-19 pandemic, they were played on 7 and 8 October 2020

7 October 2020	EDF Logroño	0–0 (a.e.t.) (3–1 p)	Athletic Club	Logroño
20:00		Report		Stadium: Las Gaunas; Referee: Frías Acedo
	Penalties
	Inés (penalty scored); Jade (penalty scored); Cazalla (penalty missed); Chini (penalty missed); Olga García (penalty scored)		(penalty missed) Gimbert; (penalty missed) Unzué; (penalty missed) Cirauqui; (penalty scored) Lucía García

8 October 2020	Barcelona	6–0	Sevilla	Sant Joan Despí
17:00	Oshoala 4', 39'; Hansen 18'; Patri 21'; Melanie 68'; Aitana 72'	Report		Stadium: Johan Cruyff; Referee: Gallastegui Pérez

== Final ==
13 February 2021 (originally 31 May 2020)
18:00

Barcelona	3–0	EDF Logroño
Putellas 42' (pen.); Bonmatí 44'; Hermoso 61'

La Rosaleda, Málaga
Referee: Zulema Gonzalez

== Top goalscorers ==
Rank	Player	Club	Goals
1	(Spain) Peke	Deportivo La Coruña	4
1	(Nigeria) Asisat Oshoala	Barcelona	4
3	(Spain) Garazi Murua	Athletic Club	3
4	(Spain) Carol	EDF Logroño	2
4	(Russia) Nadezhda Karpova	Sevilla	2
4	(Paraguay) Jessica Martínez	Tacón	2
4	(Norway) Caroline Graham Hansen	Barcelona	2
