= 2021–22 Primera División (women) =

Spanish women's 1st tier association football season

Primera División
- Season: 2021–22
- Dates: 5 September 2021 – 15 May 2022
- Teams: 16
- Champions: Barcelona; 7th title
- Relegated: Rayo Vallecano; Eibar
- Champions League: Barcelona; Real Sociedad; Real Madrid
- Matches: 240
- Goals: 760 (3.17 per match)
- Top goalscorer: Asisat Oshoala (20 goals)
- Biggest home win: Barcelona 9–1 Alavés (1 October 2021)
- Biggest away win: Sevilla 1–10 Barcelona (19 November 2021)
- Highest scoring: Sevilla 1–10 Barcelona (19 November 2021)
- Longest winning run: Barcelona (30 matches)
- Longest unbeaten run: Barcelona (30 matches)
- Longest winless run: Sporting de Huelva (15 matches)
- Longest losing run: Madrid CFF (9 matches)
- Highest attendance: 10,272; Real Sociedad 6–1 Alavés (15 May 2022)

The 2021–22 Primera División Femenina de Fútbol was the 34th edition of Spain's highest women's football league, the 21st since the inception of the Superliga Femenina. The league began on 5 September 2021 and finished on 15 May 2022.

Barcelona were the defending champions. They defended the title with a perfect season (30 wins in 30 matches).

== Teams ==
Location of the 2021–22 Primera División teams
Location of Community of Madrid teams in 2021–22 Primera División
Canary Islands location of the 2021–22 Primera División teams

=== Stadia and locations ===
Team	Home city	Stadium	Capacity
Alavés (Note: Promoted from the 2020–21 Segunda División Pro (women).)	Vitoria-Gasteiz	Ciudad Deportiva José Luis Compañón	2,500
Athletic Club	Bilbao	Instalaciones de Lezama	3,200
Atlético de Madrid	Madrid	Centro Deportivo Wanda	2,500
Barcelona	Barcelona	Johan Cruyff	6,000
Betis	Seville	Luis del Sol	1,300
Eibar	Eibar	Unbe	500
Granadilla	Granadilla de Abona	La Palmera	2,700
Levante	Valencia	Ciudad Deportiva de Buñol	600
Madrid CFF	Madrid	Estadio Antiguo Canódromo	3,500
Rayo Vallecano	Madrid	Ciudad Deportiva	2,500
Real Madrid	Madrid	Alfredo Di Stéfano	6,000
Real Sociedad	San Sebastián	Zubieta	2,500
Sevilla	Seville	Jesús Navas	5,000
Sporting de Huelva	Huelva	La Orden	2,000
Valencia	Valencia	Antonio Puchades	3,000
Villarreal	Vila-real	Mini Estadi	5,000

=== Personnel and sponsorship ===
Team	Head coach	Captain	Kit manufacturer	Main shirt sponsor
Alavés	Mikel Crespo	(Spain) Alba Aznar	Kelme	Ingevel
Athletic Club	Iraia Iturregi	(Spain) Garazi Murua	New Balance	Euskaltel
Atlético de Madrid	Óscar Fernández	(Spain) Amanda Sampedro	Nike	Herbalife
Barcelona	Jonatan Giráldez	(Spain) Alexia Putellas	Nike	Stanley
Betis	Juan Carlos Amorós	(Spain) Nuria Ligero	Kappa	Betway
Eibar	Ana Junyent	(Spain) Sheila Elorza	Joma	Euskaltel
Granadilla	Francis Díaz	(Spain) Pisco	Hummel	Egatesa
Levante	Ángel Villacampa	(Spain) Alharilla	Macron	Germaine de Capuccini
Madrid CFF	María Pry	(Spain) Paola Ulloa	Adidas	Thermor
Rayo Vallecano	Carlos Santiso	(Spain) Patricia Larqué	Umbro	Genova International School of Soccer
Real Madrid	Alberto Toril	(Spain) Ivana Andrés	Adidas	Emirates - Fly Better
Real Sociedad	Natalia Arroyo	(Spain) Nerea Eizagirre	Macron	Euskaltel
Sevilla	Cristian Toro	(Colombia) Isabella Echeverri	Nike	
Sporting de Huelva	Antonio Toledo	(Spain) Sandra Castelló	Mercury	Huelva
Valencia	Andrea Esteban	(Spain) Marta Carro	Puma	Teika
Villarreal	Sara Monforte	(Spain) Lara Mata	Joma	Pamesa Cerámica

=== Managerial changes ===
Team	Outgoing manager	Date of vacancy	Manner of departure	Position in table	Incoming manager	Date of appointment
Real Madrid	David Aznar	29 Nov 2021	Sacked	10th	Alberto Toril	29 Nov 2021
Madrid CFF	Víctor Miguel Fernández	25 Jan 2022	Sacked	11th	María Pry	27 Jan 2022
Rayo Vallecano	Miguel Ángel Quejigo	28 Jan 2022	Sacked	16th	Carlos Santiso	28 Jan 2022

== League table ==
=== Standings ===
Pos	Team	Pld	W	D	L	GF	GA	GD	Pts	Qualification or relegation
1	Barcelona (C)	30	30	0	0	159	11	+148	90	Qualification for the Champions League group stage
2	Real Sociedad	30	21	3	6	67	38	+29	66	Qualification for the Champions League second round
3	Real Madrid	30	19	3	8	41	31	+10	60	Qualification for the Champions League first round
4	Atlético de Madrid	30	17	8	5	71	28	+43	59	
5	Granadilla	30	16	6	8	42	44	−2	54	
6	Levante	30	15	5	10	52	39	+13	50	
7	Athletic Club	30	14	5	11	45	47	−2	47	
8	Sevilla	30	10	8	12	37	52	−15	38	
9	Betis	30	7	10	13	31	52	−21	31	
10	Sporting de Huelva	30	6	13	11	28	44	−16	31	
11	Alavés	30	8	6	16	30	63	−33	30	
12	Villarreal	30	8	5	17	29	63	−34	29	
13	Madrid CFF	30	8	3	19	42	64	−22	27	
14	Valencia	30	7	6	17	27	56	−29	27	
15	Eibar (R)	30	7	2	21	35	63	−28	23	Relegation to Primera Federación
16	Rayo Vallecano (R)	30	3	5	22	27	68	−41	14	Relegation to Primera Federación

Source: RFEF Primera Iberdrola
Rules for classification: 1) Points; 2) Head-to-head points; 3) Goal difference; 4) Number of goals scored
(C) Champions; (R) Relegated

=== Results ===
Home \ Away	ALA	ATH	ATM	BAR	BET	EIB	GRA	LEV	MAD	RAY	RMA	RSO	SEV	SPH	VAL	VIL
Alavés	—	1–3	1–1	0–6	2–1	1–0	1–1	1–1	2–1	3–1	0–1	0–4	1–1	0–0	3–1	2–0
Athletic Club	4–1	—	2–1	0–3	1–1	3–1	2–1	2–3	2–1	2–1	2–0	0–1	1–4	2–2	2–2	2–1
Atlético de Madrid	3–2	3–0	—	0–3	6–1	3–1	4–1	2–1	3–2	5–0	0–2	0–1	5–0	3–2	3–0	3–0
Barcelona	9–1	4–0	2–1	—	4–0	7–0	5–0	4–0	7–0	4–0	5–0	8–1	5–1	5–0	8–0	6–1
Betis	4–1	4–2	1–1	0–5	—	2–0	2–2	1–0	4–5	1–3	1–4	0–3	0–0	0–0	0–0	0–1
Eibar	2–0	1–2	0–3	0–3	1–2	—	0–2	1–2	2–1	4–0	0–2	2–3	3–2	1–2	5–1	1–1
Granadilla	1–0	2–0	1–1	0–7	0–0	3–2	—	2–0	1–2	3–2	1–1	1–1	1–0	1–0	2–1	3–1
Levante	3–0	2–3	0–5	1–4	1–1	5–0	4–1	—	4–0	4–2	4–0	1–0	3–0	0–0	1–0	1–2
Madrid CFF	0–1	0–2	2–2	1–2	2–2	1–3	0–1	1–3	—	4–2	1–3	1–2	1–2	2–1	1–0	2–4
Rayo Vallecano	1–2	0–2	0–0	1–6	0–2	0–1	1–2	3–4	3–2	—	0–1	1–3	1–0	0–0	1–1	2–2
Real Madrid	1–1	2–0	0–2	1–3	1–0	2–1	2–0	1–0	1–0	1–0	—	0–1	3–1	3–0	2–1	1–0
Real Sociedad	6–1	1–0	2–2	1–9	4–0	2–1	3–0	0–1	0–1	4–0	1–3	—	2–0	2–2	4–1	4–0
Sevilla	1–0	0–0	0–0	1–10	0–0	4–1	1–2	0–0	2–2	2–1	3–0	1–2	—	3–1	3–1	0–3
Sporting de Huelva	2–1	2–0	0–3	0–5	0–1	1–1	0–3	1–1	2–0	1–1	3–1	1–2	0–0	—	2–0	0–0
Valencia	1–0	1–3	1–1	0–2	1–0	2–0	1–2	2–0	1–3	1–0	0–0	0–3	1–2	2–2	—	2–1
Villarreal	3–1	1–1	0–5	0–8	2–0	1–0	0–2	0–2	0–3	1–0	0–2	1–4	2–3	1–1	0–2	—

Source: RFEF Primera Iberdrola
Legend: Blue = home team win; Yellow = draw; Red = away team win.

=== Positions by round ===
The table lists the positions of teams after each week of matches. In order to preserve chronological evolvements, any postponed matches are not included to the round at which they were originally scheduled, but added to the full round they were played immediately afterwards.

Team ╲ Round	1	2	3	4	5	6	7	8	9	10	11	12	13	14	15	16	17	18	19	20	21	22	23	24	25	26	27	28	29	30
Barcelona	2	1	1	1	1	1	1	1	1	1	1	1	1	1	1	1	1	1	1	1	1	1	1	1	1	1	1	1	1	1
Real Sociedad	4	3	3	3	2	2	2	2	2	2	2	2	2	2	2	2	2	2	2	2	2	2	2	2	2	2	2	2	2	2
Real Madrid	14	16	14	14	14	13	13	12	11	10	10	9	9	8	6							6	5		4				4	3
Atlético de Madrid	1	2	2	2	3	3	5	3	3	4	3	3	3	3	3	3					4	4	3		3				3	4
Granadilla	15	15	13	13	10	10	11	11	8	7	8	6	5	4	4	4				3		3	4		5				5	5
Levante	3	5	7	6	6	5	4	5	4	8	5	7	8	9	10						9	7	7		7				6	6
Athletic Club	5	7	5	4	4	4	3	4	5	3	4	5	4	5	5							5	6		6				7	7
Sevilla	10	11	11	11	9	8	8	9	9	9	9	10	10	10	10					7	8	8	8		8				8	8
Betis	11	14	12	12	11	11	9	8	10	11	11	11	11	11	11	11					10	10	9		10				9	9
Sporting de Huelva	8	10	10	9	13	12	12	13	13	13	13	14	13	14	14	14					14	13	13		13				12	10
Alavés	7	4	4	5	5	7	6	6	7	6	6	4	6	6	7	7					8	9	10		9				10	11
Villarreal	9	6	8	8	12	14	15	16	16	16	16	16	16	16	16						13	14	14		11				11	12
Madrid CFF	12	9	6	7	7	6	7	7	6	5	7	8	7	7	9						11	12	11		12				13	13
Valencia	13	12	15	16	16	16	14	15	14	14	14	13	14	12	12	12				12	11	11	12		14				14	14
Eibar	6	8	9	10	8	9	10	10	12	12	12	12	12	13	13	13					15	15	15		15				15	15
Rayo Vallecano	16	13	16	15	15	15	16	14	15	15	15	15	15	15	15			16	16	16	16	16	16	16	16	16	16	16	16	16

Leader and UEFA Champions League group stage
UEFA Champions League second round
UEFA Champions League first round
Relegation to Segunda División
Relegation to Segunda División

Updated to match(es) played on 15 May 2022. Source: RFEF Primera Iberdrola

== Statistics ==
=== Top goalscorers ===
Rank	Player	Team	Goals
1	(Nigeria) Asisat Oshoala	Barcelona	20
2	(Brazil) Geyse Ferreira	Madrid CFF	20
3	(Spain) Alexia Putellas	Barcelona	18
4	(Spain) Amaiur Sarriegi	Real Sociedad	17
5	(Netherlands) Lieke Martens	Barcelona	16
5	(Spain) Jennifer Hermoso	Barcelona	16
5	(Spain) Nerea Eizagirre	Real Sociedad	16
8	(Spain) Esther González	Real Madrid	14
8	(Spain) Clàudia Pina	Barcelona	14
10	(Spain) Aitana Bonmati	Barcelona	13
10	(Spain) Cristina Martín-Prieto	Granadilla	13

=== Hat-tricks ===
Player	For	Against	Result	Date	Round
(Spain) Alexia Putellas	Barcelona	Valencia	8-0 (H)	24 September 2021	Round 3
(Brazil) Geyse Ferreira^{4}	Madrid CFF	Real Betis	4-5 (A)	9 October 2021	Round 6
(Spain) Mari Paz Vilas	Real Betis	Athletic Club	4-2 (H)	31 October 2021	Round 8
(Spain) Alba Redondo	Levante	Madrid CFF	4-0 (H)	19 November 2021	Round 11
(Spain) Jennifer Hermoso^{4}	Barcelona	Sevilla	10-1 (A)	19 November 2021	Round 11
(Spain) Alexia Putellas	Barcelona	Madrid CFF	7-0 (H)	22 December 2021	Round 15
(Netherlands) Lieke Martens	Barcelona	Sporting Huelva	5-0 (H)	12 January 2022	Round 17
(Spain) Clàudia Pina	Barcelona	Deportivo Alavés	6-0 (A)	6 March 2022	Round 23
(Spain) Clàudia Pina	Barcelona	Villarreal	6-1 (H)	2 April 2022	Round 26

=== Scoring ===
- First goal of the season:
  (Spain) Bruna Vilamala for Barcelona against Granadilla (4 September 2021)
- Last goal of the season:
  (Spain) Nerea Eizagirre for Real Sociedad against Deportivo Alavés (15 May 2022)

=== Discipline ===
Player

- Most yellow cards: 8
  - (Spain) Ana González (Real Betis)
- Most red cards: 1
  - 15 players

Team

- Most yellow cards: 53
  - Real Betis
- Most red cards: 4
  - Real Betis

== Number of teams by autonomous community ==
Rank	Autonomous Community	Number	Teams
1	(Basque Country (autonomous community)) Basque Country	4	Alavés, Athletic Bilbao, Eibar, and Real Sociedad
1	Community of Madrid	4	Atlético Madrid, Madrid CFF, Rayo Vallecano, and Real Madrid
3	Andalusia	3	Betis, Sevilla, and Sporting de Huelva
3	Valencian Community	3	Levante, Valencia and Villarreal
5	Canary Islands	1	Granadilla
5	Catalonia	1	Barcelona
