= Centenary Trophy =

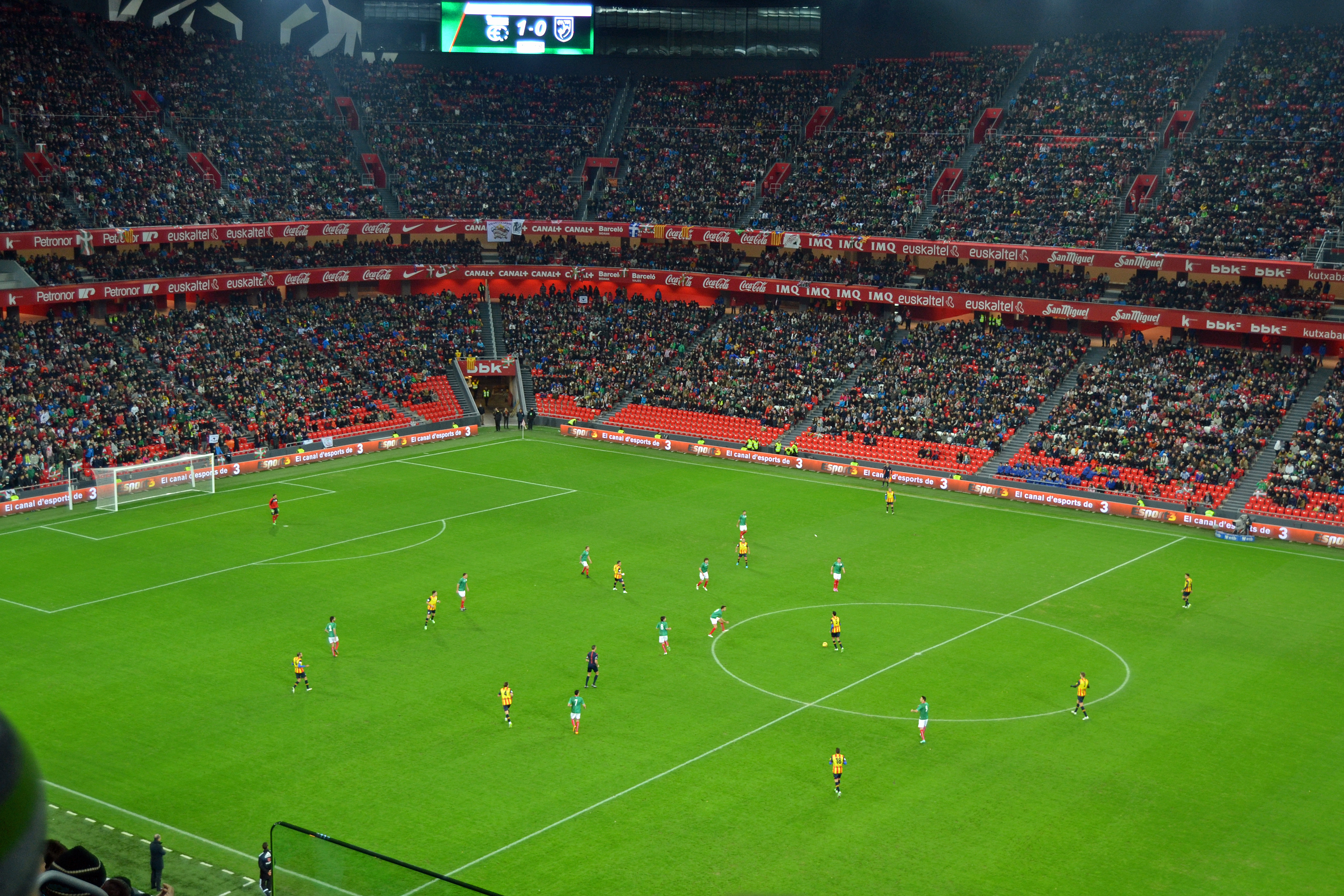
- Supporters' view from within San Mamés Stadium of the men's match between Basque Country and Catalonia, December 2014
- Organising body: Catalan Football Federation
- Founded: December 2014; 10 years ago
- Region: International
- Number of teams: 2
- Most successful club(s): Men's; Basque Country (1 title); Women's; Basque Country (1 title)

The Centenary Trophy (Catalan: Trofeu centenari, Basque: Mendeurrena Trofeoa, Spanish: Trofeo del centenario) was an association football friendly tournament organised in Spain by the Catalan Football Federation in which the Catalonia national team played against the Basque Country national team. It was created in 2014 and was played in December of that year, and in December 2015.

== History ==
Since the 1990s, both the Basque Country and Catalonia international teams (which hold unofficial status) have typically organised a friendly match each year, often during Spanish football's short break around Christmas. In December 2014, Catalonia travelled to Biscay to play against the Basque Country, arranging both men's and women's fixtures to commemorate the first meetings between the men's teams 100 years earlier in January 1915 (although this was not advertised as the first in a 'double-header' at that time). It was the 12th match overall between them, in contrast to the women's teams who had never played each other before.

Both 2014 matches ended in 1–1 draws. Repeats were scheduled for the following year, this time in Barcelona, now billed as the return leg of a Centenary Trophy between the sides. Cups were commissioned for the champions, and it was confirmed that penalties would decide the winner if necessary. The Basque teams emerged as narrow victors in both genders: 1–0 in the men's match and 4–3 on penalties in the women's match following another 1–1 draw.

== Results ==
=== Men's ===
| 28 December 2014 First edition | Basque Country | 1–1 | Catalonia | Bilbao, Basque Country, Spain |
| 20:30 | Aduriz 3' | Report | S. García 44' | Stadium: San Mamés Stadium; Attendance: 40,000; Referee: Iñaki Vicandi Garrido (Spain) |

| 26 December 2015 Second edition | Catalonia | 0–1 | Basque Country | Barcelona, Catalonia, Spain |
| 20:30 | | Report | Aduriz 40' | Stadium: Camp Nou; Attendance: 51,224; Referee: Xavier Estrada Fernández (Spain) |

=== Women's ===
| 27 December 2014 First edition | Basque Country | 1–1 | Catalonia | Barakaldo, Basque Country, Spain |
| 18:30 | Díaz Cirauqui 18' | Report | Olga García 6' | Stadium: Campo de Lasesarre; Attendance: 2,000; Referee: Carlos Arriola (Spain) |

| 26 December 2015 Second edition | Catalonia | 1–1 (3–4 p) | Basque Country | Barcelona, Catalonia, Spain |
| 18:45 | Corredera 90+1' | Report | Beristain 75' | Stadium: Mini Estadi; Attendance: 4,106; Referee: Rebollo López (Spain) |
| | Penalties |
| | Serna (penalty missed); Putellas (penalty scored); Mendoza (penalty scored); Corredera (penalty scored); Carreras (penalty missed) | | (penalty scored) Beristain; (penalty scored) Lareo; (penalty scored) Corres; (penalty scored) Baños |

== See also ==
- Catalonia International Trophy
