= 2023–24 Liga F =

Spanish women's 1st tier association football season

Liga F
- Season: 2023–24
- Dates: 8 September 2023 – 16 June 2024
- Champions: Barcelona; 9th title
- Relegated: Sporting de Huelva; Villarreal
- Champions League: Barcelona; Real Madrid; Atlético Madrid
- Matches: 240
- Goals: 755 (3.15 per match)
- Top goalscorer: Caroline Graham Hansen (21 goals)
- Biggest home win: Barcelona 9–1 Las Planas (6 January 2024); Barcelona 8–0 Sevilla (5 November 2023); Barcelona 8–0 Madrid CFF (1 May 2024)
- Biggest away win: Real Sociedad 1–7 Barcelona (10 March 2024); Villarreal 0–6 Barcelona (11 November 2023); Real Betis 0–6 Barcelona (28 January 2024)
- Highest scoring: Barcelona 9–1 Las Planas (6 January 2024)
- Longest winning run: Barcelona (16 matches)
- Longest unbeaten run: Barcelona (30 matches)
- Longest winless run: Levante Las Planas (17 matches)
- Longest losing run: Granada (11 matches)
- Highest attendance: 38,707; Barcelona 5–0 Real Madrid (19 November 2023)
- Total attendance: 371,950
- Average attendance: 1,550

The 2023–24 Primera División Femenina de Fútbol season, branded as Liga F, was the 36th edition of the Primera División Femenina de España de fútbol, and the second edition with professional status in its history. The tournament was organized by the Liga Profesional Femenina de Fútbol (LPFF).

Barcelona were the defending champions after winning the previous edition (28 wins, 1 draw and 1 defeat). They defended the title while remaining unbeaten with 29 wins and only one draw.

The competition was scheduled to start on 8 September 2023, but two days before that, it was reported that the first two rounds would be postponed due to a strike by the players, after a pay dispute between their union (AFE) and the federation (RFEF) was not resolved.

== Summary ==
=== Postponements ===
The competition was scheduled to start on 8 September 2023, but two days before that, it was reported that the first two rounds would be postponed due to a strike by the players, after a pay dispute between their union (AFE) and the Spanish football federation (RFEF) was not resolved. The strike came after the negotiations for a higher minimum wage were not resolved before the start of the season.

On 14 September 2023, an agreement for the next three seasons was reached between the parties to end the strike, which paved the way for the league season to start the next day with the matchday two matches. The matchday one matches were played from 3–5 October 2023.

== Teams ==
=== Changes from 2022–23 season ===
At the end of the 2022–23 season, Eibar and Granada were promoted to Liga F from the Primera Federación, taking the places of Alavés and Alhama who were relegated.

=== Stadiums and locations ===
Team	Home city	Stadium	Capacity
Athletic Club	Bilbao	Lezama 2	3,200
Atlético Madrid	Madrid	Centro Deportivo Wanda	2,700
Barcelona	Barcelona	Johan Cruyff Stadium	6,000
Eibar	Eibar	Ipurua	8,164
Granada	Granada	Ciudad Deportiva del Granada CF	600
Levante	Valencia	Ciudad Deportiva de Buñol	3,000
Levante Las Planas	Sant Joan Despí	Municipal de Les Planes	2,000
Madrid CFF	San Sebastián de los Reyes	Estadio Fernando Torres	6,000
Real Betis	Seville	Estadio Luis del Sol	1,300
Real Madrid	Madrid	Alfredo Di Stéfano Stadium	6,000
Real Sociedad	San Sebastián	Campo José Luis Orbegozo	2,500
Sevilla	Seville	Estadio Jesús Navas	8,000
Sporting de Huelva	Huelva	Ciudad Deportiva del Recreativo de Huelva	1,300
UD Tenerife	Adeje	Campo Municipal de Adeje	1,200
Valencia	Valencia	Estadio Antonio Puchades	3,000
Villarreal	Villarreal	Ciudad Deportiva Pamesa Cerámica	3,500

=== Personnel and sponsorship ===
Team	Head coach	Captain	Kit manufacturer	Main shirt sponsor
Athletic Club	(Spain) David Aznar	(Spain) Garazi Murua	Castore	None
Atlético Madrid	(Spain) Arturo Ruiz	(Spain) Lola Gallardo	Nike	Herbalife
Barcelona	(Spain) Jonatan Giráldez	(Spain) Alexia Putellas	Nike	Spotify
Eibar	(Spain) Yerai Martín	(Spain) Arene Altonaga	Hummel	Smartlog Group
Granada	(Spain) Roger Lamesa	(Spain) Lauri	Adidas	Wiber
Levante	(Spain) Sánchez Vera	(Spain) Alharilla	Macron	Fibra Valencia
Levante Las Planas	(Spain) Ferran Bellet	(Spain) Mari Paz Vilas	Hummel	None
Madrid CFF	(Spain) Víctor Martín Alba	(Spain) Paola Ulloa	Adidas	Thermor
Real Betis	(Spain) Joseba Agirre	(Spain) Nuria Ligero	Hummel	Social Energy
Real Madrid	(Spain) Alberto Toril	(Spain) Ivana Andrés	Adidas	Emirates
Real Sociedad	(Spain) Natalia Arroyo	(Spain) Nerea Eizagirre	Macron	Halcón Viajes
Sevilla	(Argentina) Cristian Toro	(Spain) Amanda Sampedro	Castore	None
Sporting de Huelva	(Spain) Paco Pichardo	(Spain) Sandra Castelló	Joma	Huelva Original
UD Tenerife	(Spain) José Ángel Herrera	(Spain) Pisco	Hummel	Tenerife! Despierta emociones
Valencia	(Spain) Jesús Oliva	(Spain) Marta Carro	Puma	TM Grupo Inmobiliario
Villarreal	(Spain) Sara Monforte	(Spain) Paola Soldevila	Joma	Pamesa Cerámica

=== Managerial changes ===
Team	Outgoing manager	Manner of departure	Date of vacancy	Position in table	Incoming manager	Date of appointment
Sporting de Huelva	(Spain) Antonio Toledo	Resigned	24 November 2023	16th	(Spain) Iván Rosado	27 November 2023
Sporting de Huelva	(Spain) Iván Rosado	Resigned	6 March 2024	16th	(Spain) Paco Pichardo	7 March 2024
Atlético Madrid	(Spain) Manolo Cano	Sacked	25 March 2024	5th	(Spain) Arturo Ruiz	26 March 2024
Real Betis	(Spain) María Pry	Mutual agreement	28 March 2024	15th	(Spain) Joseba Agirre	28 March 2024

== League table ==
=== Standings ===
Pos	Team	Pld	W	D	L	GF	GA	GD	Pts	Qualification or relegation
1	Barcelona (C)	30	29	1	0	137	10	+127	88	Qualification for the Champions League group stage
2	Real Madrid	30	24	1	5	74	33	+41	73	Qualification for the Champions League second round
3	Atlético de Madrid	30	18	7	5	53	22	+31	61	Qualification for the Champions League first round
4	Levante	30	17	9	4	59	28	+31	60	
5	Athletic Club	30	17	2	11	38	37	+1	53	
6	Madrid CFF	30	15	5	10	61	54	+7	50	
7	Sevilla	30	13	5	12	53	56	−3	44	
8	Real Sociedad	30	9	9	12	40	55	−15	36	
9	UDG Tenerife	30	8	8	14	35	48	−13	32	
10	Eibar	30	8	7	15	22	48	−26	31	
11	Real Betis	30	8	6	16	31	69	−38	30	
12	Valencia	30	8	5	17	35	64	−29	29	
13	Levante Las Planas	30	6	10	14	38	58	−20	28	
14	Granada	30	8	3	19	33	58	−25	27	
15	Villarreal (R)	30	6	7	17	26	52	−26	25	Relegation to Primera Federación
16	Sporting de Huelva (R)	30	2	3	25	20	63	−43	9	Relegation to Primera Federación

Source: Liga F
Rules for classification: 1) Points; 2) Head-to-head points; 3) Goal difference; 4) Number of goals scored
(C) Champions; (R) Relegated

=== Results ===
Home \ Away	ATH	ATM	BAR	EIB	GRA	LEV	LLP	MAD	BET	RMA	RSO	SEV	SPH	UDT	VAL	VIL
Athletic Club	—	1–0	0–4	2–0	1–0	1–0	4–1	1–2	1–0	0–1	2–1	2–1	3–0	4–1	2–0	1–0
Atlético Madrid	3–0	—	0–1	3–0	2–0	0–1	3–1	1–1	5–1	1–1	1–1	2–1	1–0	1–0	1–0	1–0
Barcelona	7–0	2–0	—	5–0	6–1	1–1	9–1	8–0	5–1	5–0	3–0	8–0	4–0	7–0	6–0	5–1
Eibar	0–2	1–1	0–4	—	0–2	0–0	1–2	1–6	3–2	0–1	0–2	3–0	1–0	0–1	1–0	0–0
Granada	2–0	0–1	1–4	1–2	—	0–3	0–1	3–0	2–3	2–5	2–1	2–2	0–1	2–1	0–1	1–2
Levante	1–2	1–1	0–5	3–0	2–2	—	1–1	3–0	7–0	2–4	4–3	2–0	2–0	1–0	3–1	2–1
Levante Las Planas	2–1	1–1	2–4	1–1	1–2	1–1	—	3–4	1–2	0–2	0–2	1–2	1–1	3–1	3–0	1–1
Madrid CFF	2–1	1–4	0–2	1–2	1–0	0–1	2–1	—	3–1	0–1	2–3	3–3	2–1	3–2	6–1	2–0
Real Betis	1–0	0–2	0–6	0–0	2–3	0–4	1–0	0–0	—	1–4	0–0	1–1	3–1	1–0	2–2	1–0
Real Madrid	1–0	2–3	0–3	1–0	5–0	1–2	2–1	2–1	5–1	—	7–1	1–3	5–2	2–1	7–1	1–0
Real Sociedad	0–1	0–2	1–7	3–1	1–1	1–1	2–2	1–1	2–1	1–2	—	1–2	1–1	3–3	2–0	1–0
Sevilla	1–1	1–1	0–3	3–0	1–0	1–3	3–0	1–5	6–0	0–1	4–2	—	2–0	5–1	1–2	3–1
Sporting de Huelva	1–2	0–2	1–2	0–1	2–1	1–1	1–2	1–3	1–3	1–4	1–2	1–3	—	1–2	1–3	0–1
UD Tenerife	1–1	2–1	0–2	1–1	2–0	0–1	1–1	2–2	1–0	1–2	0–1	5–0	2–0	—	1–0	1–1
Valencia	1–2	1–6	0–3	0–2	4–1	1–1	1–1	3–4	2–2	0–2	3–0	3–1	2–0	1–1	—	0–1
Villarreal	3–0	1–3	0–6	1–1	1–2	0–5	2–2	1–4	2–1	0–2	1–1	1–2	2–0	1–1	1–2	—

Source: Liga F
Legend: Blue = home team win; Yellow = draw; Red = away team win.

=== Positions by round ===
The table lists the positions of teams after each week of matches. In order to preserve chronological evolvements, any postponed matches are not included to the round at which they were originally scheduled, but added to the full round they were played immediately afterwards.

Team ╲ Round	1	2	3	4	5	6	7	8	9	10	11	12	13	14	15	16	17	18	19	20	21	22	23	24	25	26	27	28	29	30
Barcelona	2	1	1	1	1	1	1	1	1	1	1	1	1	1	1	1	1	1	1	1	1	1	1	1	1	1	1	1	1	1
Real Madrid	5	2	2	2	2	3	2	2	2	2	3	2	3	3	2	2	2	2	2	2	2	2	2	2	2	2	2	2	2	2
Atlético Madrid	1	4	3	3	4	4	5	5	4	4	2	5	4	5	5	5	5	5	5	5	5	4	5	4	3	3	3	3	3	3
Levante	3	5	6	5	5	5	4	4	3	3	4	3	2	2	3	3	3	3	3	3	3	3	3	5	4	4	4	4	4	4
Athletic Club	16	15	11	7	10	8	10	11	8	11	10	10	7	8	8	9	8	8	7	7	6	6	6	6	6	5	6	6	6	5
Madrid CFF	12	6	5	4	3	2	3	3	5	5	5	4	5	4	4	4	4	4	4	4	4	5	4	3	5	6	5	5	5	6
Sevilla	14	16	9	12	12	11	12	12	10	7	6	6	6	6	6	6	6	6	6	6	7	7	7	7	7	7	7	7	7	7
Real Sociedad	10	8	7	9	8	10	9	10	12	9	9	7	8	7	7	7	7	7	8	8	8	8	8	8	9	9	8	8	8	8
UD Tenerife	4	7	10	8	7	7	7	7	9	8	8	9	9	9	9	8	9	9	9	9	9	9	9	9	8	8	9	9	9	9
Eibar	9	9	13	13	14	13	14	14	14	14	14	13	13	13	12	14	13	13	13	13	13	13	11	11	11	10	10	10	10	10
Real Betis	8	11	12	14	15	14	11	9	7	10	11	12	12	12	13	13	14	14	15	15	15	15	14	15	13	13	12	12	12	11
Valencia	15	12	14	10	9	9	8	8	11	12	12	11	11	11	11	12	12	12	12	12	10	10	10	10	10	11	11	11	11	12
Levante Las Planas	6	3	4	6	6	6	6	6	6	6	7	8	10	10	10	10	10	10	11	11	12	12	13	14	15	14	13	13	13	13
Granada	7	10	8	11	13	15	15	15	15	15	15	15	15	15	15	15	15	15	14	14	14	14	15	12	12	12	14	14	15	14
Villarreal	11	13	16	16	11	12	13	13	13	13	13	14	14	14	14	11	11	11	10	10	11	11	12	13	14	15	15	15	14	15
Sporting de Huelva	13	14	15	15	16	16	16	16	16	16	16	16	16	16	16	16	16	16	16	16	16	16	16	16	16	16	16	16	16	16

Leader and UEFA Champions League group stage
UEFA Champions League second round
UEFA Champions League first round
Relegation to Primera Federación
Relegation to Primera Federación

Source: Liga F

== Season Statistics ==
=== Goalscorers ===
Rank	Player	Team	Goals
1	(Norway) Caroline Graham Hansen	Barcelona	21
2	(Spain) Salma Paralluelo	Barcelona	20
3	(Spain) Cristina Martín-Prieto	Sevilla	17
4	(Spain) Alba Redondo	Levante	16
5	(Norway) Synne Jensen	Real Sociedad	14
6	(Spain) Sheila Guijarro	Atletico Madrid	13
6	(Spain) Clàudia Pina	Barcelona	13
6	(Denmark) Signe Bruun	Real Madrid	13
9	(Brazil) Gabi Nunes	Levante	11
9	(Spain) Ana Marcos	Valencia	11
9	(Jamaica) Kayla McKenna	Villarreal	11

=== Assists ===
Rank	Player	Team	Assists
1	(Norway) Caroline Graham Hansen	Barcelona	19
2	(Spain) Aitana Bonmatí	Barcelona	11
3	(Spain) Mariona Caldentey	Barcelona	9
4	(Chile) Karen Araya	Madrid CFF	8
4	(Spain) Olga Carmona	Real Madrid	8
4	(Spain) Eva Navarro	Atletico Madrid	8
7	(Nigeria) Rinsola Babajide	UD Tenerife	7
7	(France) Naomie Feller	Real Madrid	7
9	(Nigeria) Rasheedat Ajibade	Atletico Madrid	6
9	(Spain) Ona Batlle	Barcelona	6
9	(Netherlands) Esmee Brugts	Barcelona	6
9	(Spain) Athenea del Castillo	Real Madrid	6
9	(Spain) Irina Uribe	Levante Las Planas	6
9	(Spain) Rosa Otermín	Sevilla	6

=== Hat-tricks ===
Player	For	Against	Result	Date	Round
(Zambia) Racheal Kundananji	Madrid CFF	Sevilla	5–1 (A)	30 September 2023	3
(Spain) Salma Paralluelo^{4}	Barcelona	Sevilla	8–0 (H)	5 November 2023	7
(Netherlands) Esmee Brugts	Barcelona	Eibar	5–0 (H)	9 December 2023	11
(Spain) Sheila Guijarro^{4}	Atlético Madrid	Valencia	6–1 (A)	7 January 2024	13
(Denmark) Caroline Møller	Real Madrid	Valencia	7–1 (H)	3 February 2024	16
(Spain) Salma Paralluelo^{4}	Barcelona	Real Sociedad	7–1 (A)	10 March 2024	19
(Brazil) Giovana Queiroz	Madrid CFF	Villarreal	4–1 (A)	16 March 2024	20
(Spain) Patricia Zugasti	Athletic Club	Levante Las Planas	4–1 (H)	31 March 2024	22

(H) – Home; (A) – Away
^{4} – Player scored four goals.

=== Clean sheets ===
Rank	Player	Club	Clean sheets
1	(Spain) Cata Coll	Barcelona	12
2	(Spain) Adriana Nanclares	Athletic Club	10
3	(Sweden) Emma Holmgren	Levante	9
3	(Spain) Misa Rodríguez	Real Madrid	9
3	(Spain) Lola Gallardo	Atlético Madrid	9
6	(Spain) Sandra Paños	Barcelona	8
6	(Spain) María Miralles	Eibar	8
8	(Spain) Paula Vizoso	Real Betis	7
9	(Brazil) Aline Reis	UD Tenerife	5
9	(Spain) Elene Lete	Real Sociedad	5

=== Scoring ===
- First goal of the season:
  (Spain) Athenea del Castillo for Real Madrid against Valencia (15 September 2023)
- Last goal of the season:
  (Spain) Cristina Martín-Prieto for Sevilla against Athletic Club (16 June 2024)

=== Discipline ===
Player

- Most yellow cards: 9
  - (Ivory Coast) Bernadette Amani (Eibar)
  - (Paraguay) Jessica Martinez (Levante Las Planas)
  - (Spain) Rosa Márquez (Real Betis)
  - (Spain) Paula Perea (Real Betis)
  - (Uruguay) Pamela González (Sevilla)
- Most red cards: 2
  - (Spain) Claudia Blanco (UD Tenerife)

Team

- Most yellow cards: 63
  - Real Betis
- Fewest yellow cards: 17
  - Barcelona
- Most red cards: 4
  - UD Tenerife
- Fewest red cards: 0
  - Athletic Club
  - Barcelona
  - Granada
  - Levante
  - Real Madrid

== Awards ==
=== Team of the Season ===
EA SPORTS Team of the Season
Goalkeeper	(Spain) Lola Gallardo (Atlético Madrid)			
Defenders	(Argentina) Aldana Cometti (Madrid CFF)		(Spain) Olga Carmona (Real Madrid)	
Midfielders	(Spain) Aitana Bonmatí (Barcelona)	(Spain) Alexia Putellas (Barcelona)	(Spain) Patricia Guijarro (Barcelona)	(Spain) Teresa Abelleira (Real Madrid)
Forwards	(Spain) Salma Paralluelo (Barcelona)	(Norway) Caroline Graham Hansen (Barcelona)	(Spain) Cristina Martín-Prieto (Sevilla)	(Spain) Athenea del Castillo (Real Madrid)

== Number of teams by autonomous community ==
Rank	Autonomous Community	Number	Teams
1	Andalusia	4	Betis, Granada, Sevilla, and Sporting de Huelva
2	(Basque Country (autonomous community)) Basque Country	3	Athletic Club, Eibar, and Real Sociedad
2	Community of Madrid	3	Atlético Madrid, Madrid CFF, and Real Madrid
2	Valencian Community	3	Levante, Valencia and Villarreal
5	Catalonia	2	Barcelona, Levante Las Planas
6	Canary Islands	1	UD Tenerife
