= Eunate Arraiza =

Spanish footballer (born 1991)

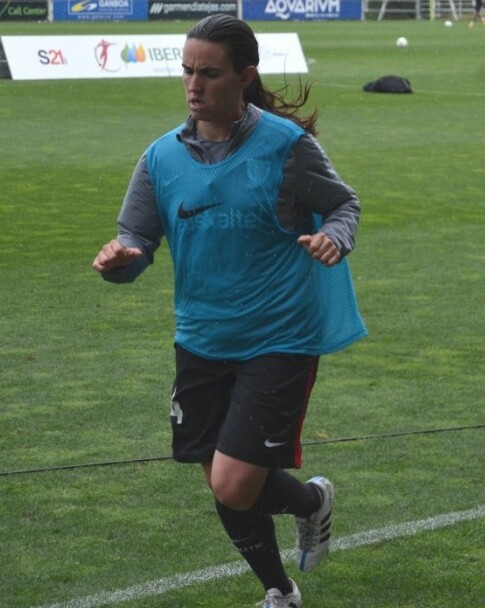
- Eunate warming up with Athletic Club, 2017

Personal information
- Full name: Eunate Arraiza Otazu
- Date of birth: 3 June 1991 (age 35)
- Place of birth: Biurrun-Olcoz, Spain
- Height: 1.63 m (5 ft 4 in)
- Positions: Left midfielder; left wing-back

Youth career
- Lagunak

Senior career*
Years	Team	Apps	(Gls)
2007–2012	Lagunak		
2012–2024	Athletic Club	290	(19)

International career
2017–2019	Spain	6	(0)
2014–	Basque Country	2	(2)
- * Club domestic league appearances and goals as of 17 June 2024

Eunate Arraiza Otazu (born 3 June 1991) is a Spanish footballer who plays as a left midfielder or left wing-back. Her main club, where she spent 12 seasons, was Athletic Club of Liga F, having started her career with local team Lagunak. She is the only deaf player who has played in the top tier of women's football in Spain.

In 2024 she left Athletic, having accumulated 312 appearances in all competitions (7th place in the club's historical rankings at that time). She was honoured with a farewell ceremony and a last starting appearance - along with fellow departing veterans Garazi Murua and Yulema Corres - on the final matchday of the 2023–24 Liga F season, in which their side defeated Sevilla 2–1 at San Mamés.

== Honours ==
Athletic Club

- Primera División: 2015-16
- Euskal Herriko Cup: 2013, 2014, 2015, 2016, 2017

Spain

- Cyprus Cup: 2018
