= 2018–19 Copa de la Reina de Fútbol =

Tournament details
- Country: Spain
- Teams: 16

Final positions
- Champions: Real Sociedad (1st title)
- Runners-up: Atlético de Madrid

Tournament statistics
- Matches played: 15
- Goals scored: 51 (3.4 per match)
- Top goal scorer(s): Ludmila da Silva (6 goals)

Awards
- Best player: María Asunción Quiñones

The 2018–19 Copa de la Reina de Fútbol was the 37th edition of the Spanish women's association football national cup. Real Sociedad won their first title ever.

== Format changes ==
Since this season, all the 16 teams of the Primera División would join the competition. All the rounds were played in a single-game format.

In the round of 16, the home team was designed by the luck of the draw, while in the quarterfinals, teams that have played the previous round away had preference to host the match.

On 17 January 2019, the Royal Spanish Football Federation announced that the final will be played at Los Cármenes stadium, in Granada. For the first time in the Cup history, the Spanish royal family attended the match with Queen Letizia of Spain representing it.

== Schedule and format ==
Round	Draw date	Date	Fixtures	Clubs	Format details
Round of 16	22 Oct 2018	25 Nov 2018	8	16 → 8	New entries: Clubs participating in Primera División gain entry. Opponents seeding: Teams playing the 2018–19 UEFA Women's Champions League could not face each other. Local team seeding: Luck of the draw. Knock-out tournament type: Single match.
Quarter-finals	13 Dec 2018	30 Jan 2019	4	8 → 4	Opponents seeding: Teams playing the 2018–19 UEFA Women's Champions League could not face each other. Local team seeding: Teams that played the round of 16 away. If both played it away, luck of the draw. Knock-out tournament type: Single match.
Semi-finals	4 Feb 2019	17 Feb 2019	2	4 → 2	Opponents seeding: Luck of the draw. Local team seeding: Luck of the draw. Knock-out tournament type: Single match.
Final	4 Feb 2019	11 May 2019	1	2 → 1	Single match at Estadio Los Cármenes, Granada.

Notes

- Single-match rounds ending in a tie will be decided in extra time; and if it persists, by a penalty shootout.

== Bracket ==
Round of 16
Betis	3 (3)
Athletic Club	3 (4)
Atlético de Madrid	4
Málaga	2
Madrid CFF	1
Fundación Albacete	0
Barcelona	2
Espanyol	0
Valencia	1
Real Sociedad	2
Rayo Vallecano	2 (3)
Sporting de Huelva	2 (1)
Granadilla	4 (2)
Levante	4 (3)
EDF Logroño	0
Sevilla	1

Quarterfinals
Athletic Club	0
Atlético de Madrid	2
Madrid CFF	0
Barcelona	3
Real Sociedad	4
Rayo Vallecano	0
Levante	1 (2)
Sevilla	1 (3)

Semifinals
Atlético de Madrid	2
Barcelona	0
Real Sociedad	3
Sevilla	1

Final
Atlético de Madrid	1
Real Sociedad	2

== Round of 16 ==
The round of 16 was drawn on 22 October 2018 at La Ciudad del Fútbol in Las Rozas de Madrid.

25 November 2018	Rayo Vallecano	2–2 (a.e.t.) (3–1 p)	Sporting de Huelva	Madrid
11:30	Guerrero 6'; García 60'	Report	Hernández 33' (pen.); López 37'	Stadium: Ciudad Deportiva; Referee: Ainara Andrea Acevedo Dudley

25 November 2018	Betis	3–3 (a.e.t.) (3–4 p)	Athletic Club	Seville
12:00	Borja 35', 51', 61'	Report	Perea 63' (o.g.); Nekane 67'; Murua 72' (pen.)	Stadium: Luis del Sol; Referee: Paola Cebollada López

25 November 2018	Madrid CFF	1–0	Fundación Albacete	San Sebastián de los Reyes
12:00	Mellado 70'	Report		Stadium: Nuevo Matapiñonera; Referee: Verónica González Sánchez

25 November 2018	Valencia	1–2 (a.e.t.)	Real Sociedad	Valencia
12:00	Vilas 11' (pen.)	Report	Palacios 4'; Nahikari 104'	Stadium: Antonio Puchades; Referee: Elena Contreras Patiño

25 November 2018	EDF Logroño	0–1	Sevilla	Logroño
12:30		Report	Oliveira 59' (o.g.)	Stadium: Las Gaunas; Attendance: 432; Referee: María Romero Navarro

25 November 2018	Granadilla	4–4 (a.e.t.) (2–3 p)	Levante	Granadilla de Abona
13:00	Gavira 17'; Martín-Prieto 45'; N'Guessan 68'; Marrero 111'	Report	Casado 36'; Corral 64' (pen.); Bermúdez 75', 99'	Stadium: La Palmera; Referee: Beatriz Arregui Gamir

25 November 2018	Barcelona	2–0	Espanyol	Barcelona
15:00	Putellas 15'; Duggan 29'	Report		Stadium: Mini Estadi; Attendance: 1,076; Referee: María Dolores Martínez Madrona

25 November 2018	Atlético de Madrid	4–2	Málaga	Majadahonda
17:45	Ludmila 36', 45', 49', 53'	Report	Adriana 70'; Kuč 74'	Stadium: Cerro del Espino; Attendance: 315; Referee: Olatz Rivera Olmedo

== Quarter-finals ==
The quarter-finals were drawn on 13 December 2018 at La Ciudad del Fútbol in Las Rozas de Madrid. The match between Athletic Club and Atlético de Madrid, played at San Mamés, beat the Spanish attendance record for a women's football match at that time with 48,121 spectators.

30 January 2019	Real Sociedad	4–0	Rayo Vallecano	San Sebastián
18:00	Cardona 40'; Palacios 60'; Nahikari 63'; Bautista 65'	Report		Stadium: Zubieta; Referee: Cuesta Aribas

30 January 2019	Levante	1–1 (a.e.t.) (2–3 p)	Sevilla	Valencia
18:30	Maitane 75'	Report	Araya 40' (pen.)	Stadium: Ciudad Deportiva; Referee: Martínez Martínez

30 January 2019	Athletic Club	0–2	Atlético de Madrid	Bilbao
19:00		Report	Sosa 45'; Kaci 90+5'	Stadium: San Mamés; Attendance: 48,121; Referee: Acevedo Dudley

30 January 2019	Madrid CFF	0–3	Barcelona	San Sebastián de los Reyes
20:00		Report	Martens 12'; Torrejón 52'; Hamraoui 54'	Stadium: Matapiñonera; Referee: Gallastegui Pérez

== Semi-finals ==
The semi-finals were drawn on 4 February 2019 at La Alhambra in Granada.

17 February 2019	Atlético de Madrid	2–0	Barcelona	Majadahonda
11:00	Ludmila 43', 62'	Report		Stadium: Cerro del Espino; Attendance: 3,125; Referee: Huerta de Aza

17 February 2019	Real Sociedad	3–1	Sevilla	San Sebastián
16:30	Palacios 1'; Carrasco 26' (o.g.); Etxezarreta 53'	Report	Torre 3' (o.g.)	Stadium: Anoeta; Attendance: 18,731; Referee: Frías Acedo

== Final ==
11 May 2019
20:30

Atlético de Madrid	1–2	Real Sociedad
E. González 16'	Report	Palacios 19'; Nahikari 61'

Los Cármenes, Granada
Attendance: 17,550
Referee: María Dolores Martínez Madrona

Atlético de Madrid	Real Sociedad

GK	1	(Spain) Lola Gallardo
DF	4	(Spain) Laia Aleixandri
DF	19	(France) Aïssatou Tounkara	(yellow card) 28'
DF	11	(Spain) Carmen Menayo		(substituted off) 69'
DF	2	(Mexico) Kenti Robles		(substituted off) 79'
MF	7	(Spain) Ángela Sosa
MF	10	(Spain) Amanda Sampedro
MF	15	(Spain) Silvia Meseguer		(substituted off) 87'
FW	9	(Spain) Esther González		(substituted off) 90'
FW	23	(Spain) Jennifer Hermoso
FW	8	(Brazil) Ludmila da Silva
Substitutes:
GK	25	(Spain) María Isabel Rodríguez
DF	5	(Italy) Elena Linari
MF	6	(France) Aurélie Kaci
MF	14	(Portugal) Dolores Silva		(substituted on) 90'
FW	20	(Switzerland) Viola Calligaris		(substituted on) 79'
MF	21	(Spain) Andrea Falcón		(substituted on) 69'
FW	22	(Spain) Olga García		(substituted on) 87'
Manager:
(Spain) José Luis Sánchez Vera

GK	1	(Spain) María Asunción Quiñones
DF	2	(Spain) Iraia Iparragirre
DF	19	(Spain) Núria Mendoza	(yellow card) 85'
DF	20	(Spain) Beatriz Beltrán		(substituted off) 80'
DF	14	(Spain) Leire Baños
MF	6	(Spain) Ane Etxezarreta
MF	11	(Spain) Marta Cardona		(substituted off) 68'
MF	17	(Spain) Chini	(yellow card) 51'
MF	10	(Spain) Nerea Eizagirre		(substituted off) 87'
FW	9	(Mexico) Kiana Palacios		(substituted off) 78'
FW	7	(Spain) Nahikari García
Substitutes:
GK	13	(Spain) Oihana Aldai
DF	3	(Spain) Sandra Ramajo
MF	4	(Spain) Sara Olaizola		(substituted on) 78'
MF	8	(Spain) Itxaso Uriarte
FW	12	(Spain) Manu Lareo		(substituted on) 68'
FW	16	(Spain) Carla Bautista		(substituted on) 87'
DF	18	(Spain) Paola Soldevila		(substituted on) 80'
Manager:
(Spain) Gonzalo Arconada

2018–19 Copa de la Reina champion
Real Sociedad
(First title)

== Top goalscorers ==
Rank	Player	Club	Goals
1	(Brazil) Ludmila da Silva	Atlético de Madrid	6
2	(Mexico) Kiana Palacios	Real Sociedad	4
3	(Spain) Priscila Borja	Betis	3
3	(Spain) Nahikari García	Real Sociedad	3
5	(Spain) Sonia Bermúdez	Levante	2
