= Amaia Peña =

Spanish footballer

Personal information
- Full name: Amaia Peña de las Heras
- Date of birth: 22 November 1998 (age 27)
- Place of birth: Getxo, Spain
- Height: 1.76 m (5 ft 9 in)
- Position: Goalkeeper

Team information
- Current team: Eibar (on loan from Athletic Club)

Youth career
- 2010–2012: Pauldarrak

College career
Years	Team	Apps	(Gls)
2016–2020	Pittsburgh Panthers	35	(0)

Senior career*
Years	Team	Apps	(Gls)
2012–2014	Pauldarrak		
2014–2016	Athletic Club B	31	(0)
2020–2024	Athletic Club	9	(0)
2021–2022	→ Eibar (loan)	6	(0)
2023–2024	→ Eibar (loan)	4	(0)

International career^{‡}
2015	Spain U17	4	(0)
2016	Spain U19	7	(0)
2022–	Basque Country	1	(0)
- * Club domestic league appearances and goals as of 06:46, 17 December 2023 (UTC) ‡ National team caps and goals as of 06:46, 17 December 2023 (UTC)

Amaia Peña de las Heras (Note: In this Spanish name, the first or paternal surname is Peña and the second or maternal family name is De las Heras.) (born 22 November 1998) is a Spanish footballer who plays as a goalkeeper.

== Club career ==
Born in Getxo and raised in Portugalete, Peña started her career at Pauldarrak. She joined Athletic Club in 2014, appearing for their reserve team for two seasons. She then moved to the United States to study at the University of Pittsburgh, where she played for their NCAA Division I Women's Soccer Championship team, the Panthers.

Upon completing her four-year degree course (in marketing and supply chain management) and returning to Spain in 2020, she again signed for Athletic, this time to compete for a place in the senior team with Andrea de la Nava (a former teammate at Pauldarrak), making six Primera División appearances in the 2020–21 season. With the arrival of Mariasun Quiñones that summer to be the first choice at Lezama, Peña joined Eibar on a one-year loan deal, where she was a back-up option behind Malena Mieres and Noelia García.

Having signed a new contract tying her to Athletic until the summer of 2025, Peña was loaned to Eibar again for the 2023–24 season; however, as in her first spell there she was unable to establish herself in the side, with María Miralles and Noelia selected ahead of her when available.

== International career ==
Peña was a member of the Spain under-17 squad that qualified for the UEFA Women's Under-17 Championship in 2015 (Iceland), being named in the 'Team of the Tournament' as her team won the competition. She also played at the 2016 UEFA Women's Under-19 Championship (Slovakia) in which Spain were the runners-up, and was in the squad for the 2016 FIFA U-20 Women's World Cup (Papua New Guinea), although she did not make an appearance with Mariasun Quiñones chosen as the starting goalkeeper.

She has also been selected for the unofficial Basque Country women's national football team which plays only occasionally, making her first appearance in December 2022 against Chile.
