= Miren (given name) =

Miren is a Basque feminine given name. People with the name include:

- Miren Agur Meabe (born 1962), Basque poet, prose writer, author of books for children and young adults and a translator
- Miren Amuriza (born 1990), Spanish bertsolari and Biscayan writer
- Miren Basaras (born 1968), Spanish microbiologist and professor
- Miren Etxezarreta (born 1936), Spanish Basque economist and intellectual
- Miren Gorrotxategi (born 1967), Spanish Podemos politician
- Miren Gutiérrez Almazor (born 1966), Spanish journalist, activist, scholar, and university lecturer
- Miren Ibarguren (born 1980), Spanish actress
- Miren Lazkano (born 1997), Spanish slalom canoeist
- Miren León (born 1975), Spanish former judoka
- Miren Ortubay Fuentes (born 1958), Spanish lawyer and criminologist
- Miren Karmele Azkarate Villar (born 1955), politician, professor of Basque philology, university lecturer

== See also ==
- Ane Miren, Spanish footballer
