= Iraia Iparragirre =

Spanish footballer (born 1995)

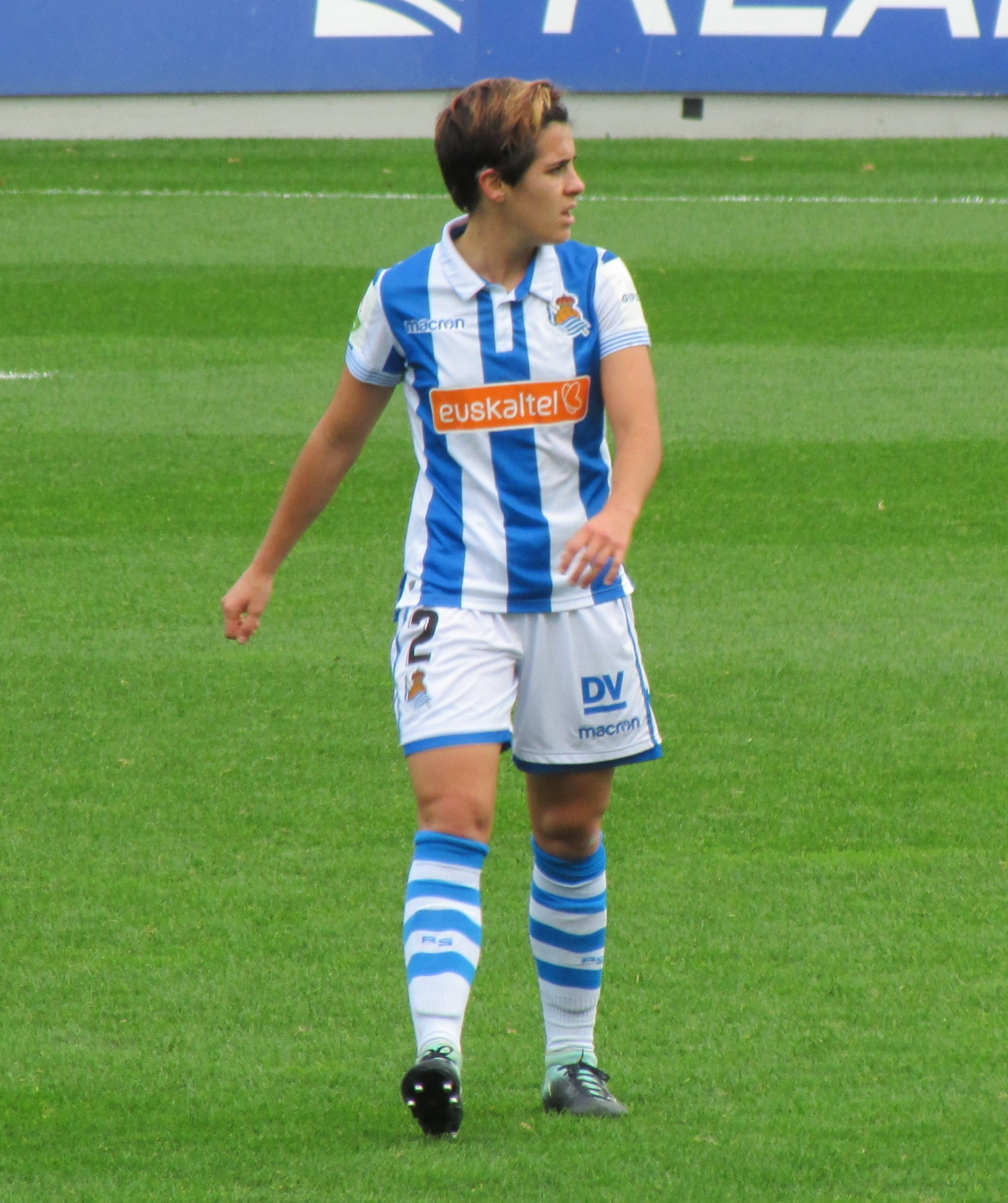

Personal information
- Full name: Iraia Iparragirre Argandoña
- Date of birth: 9 July 1995 (age 31)
- Place of birth: Lasarte-Oria, Spain
- Height: 1.67 m (5 ft 6 in)
- Position: Defender

Team information
- Current team: Real Sociedad
- Number: 2

Youth career
- 2010–2011: Ostadar

Senior career*
| Years | Team | Apps | (Gls) |
| 2011–2015 | Añorga | | |
| 2015–2023 | Real Sociedad | 103 | (2) |

International career^{‡}
| 2022 | Basque Country | 1 | (0) |
- * Club domestic league appearances and goals as of 1 July 2023 ‡ National team caps and goals as of 1 July 2023

Iraia Iparragirre Argandoña (born 9 July 1995, also spelled as Iraia Iparraguirre Argandoña) is a Spanish former footballer who played as a defender, mainly for Real Sociedad.

== Career ==
Iparragirre started her career in the youth academy of Ostadar. She joined Real Sociedad from Añorga in 2015, and made her 100th Primera División appearance for the club in February 2022. She was a member of the group which won the 2018–19 Copa de la Reina and finished as runners-up in the 2021–22 Primera División. She retired from professional football in May 2023, aged 27.

She was selected for the unofficial Basque Country women's national football team in December 2022 against Chile.
