= Ane Miren =

Spanish footballer (born 1992)

Personal information
- Full name: Ane Miren Martínez de Lahidalga Beltrán de Guevara
- Date of birth: 5 September 1992 (age 34)
- Place of birth: Foronda, Spain
- Position: Midfielder

Team information
- Current team: Alavés
- Number: 7

Senior career*
Years	Team	Apps	(Gls)
2012–2018	Aurrera Vitoria		
2018–	Alavés	101+	(17+)

International career^{‡}
2022–	Basque Country	1	(1)
- * Club domestic league appearances and goals as of 23:09, 16 December 2023 (UTC) ‡ National team caps and goals as of 23:09, 16 December 2023 (UTC)

Ane Miren Martínez de Lahidalga Beltrán de Guevara (born 5 September 1992, usually referred to by her forenames in her sporting career) is a Spanish footballer who plays as a midfielder for Alavés.

== Career ==
Ane Miren started her club career at Aurrera Vitoria.

She has been selected for the unofficial Basque Country women's national football team which plays only occasionally, making her first appearance in December 2022 against Chile and scoring a goal.

== International goals ==
Ane Miren – goals for Basque Country
#	Date	Venue	Opponent	Score	Result	Competition
1.	20 December 2022	Campo José Luis Orbegozo, San Sebastián	Chile	3–0	3–0	Friendly
