= Elixabete Capa =

Spanish footballer (born 1978)

Personal information
- Full name: Elixabete Capa Cia
- Date of birth: 20 March 1978 (age 48)
- Place of birth: San Sebastián, Spain
- Position: Goalkeeper

Senior career*
Years	Team	Apps	(Gls)
1993–2002	Añorga		
2002–2005	Athletic Bilbao	64	(0)

International career
1998–2005	Spain	26	(0)
- * Club domestic league appearances and goals

Elixabete Capa Cia is a Spanish former footballer who played as goalkeeper for Añorga KKE and Athletic Bilbao in the Superliga Femenina. She was a member of the Spain women's national football team for nearly a decade, taking part in the 1997 European Championship, where la Roja reached the semifinals, as Roser Serra's reserve. She retired in 2005 at 27, after winning her third league in a row with Athletic and playing the 2005 European Championship qualifying.

In 2007, she was Real Sociedad's assistant manager.
