= Leire Baños =

Spanish footballer

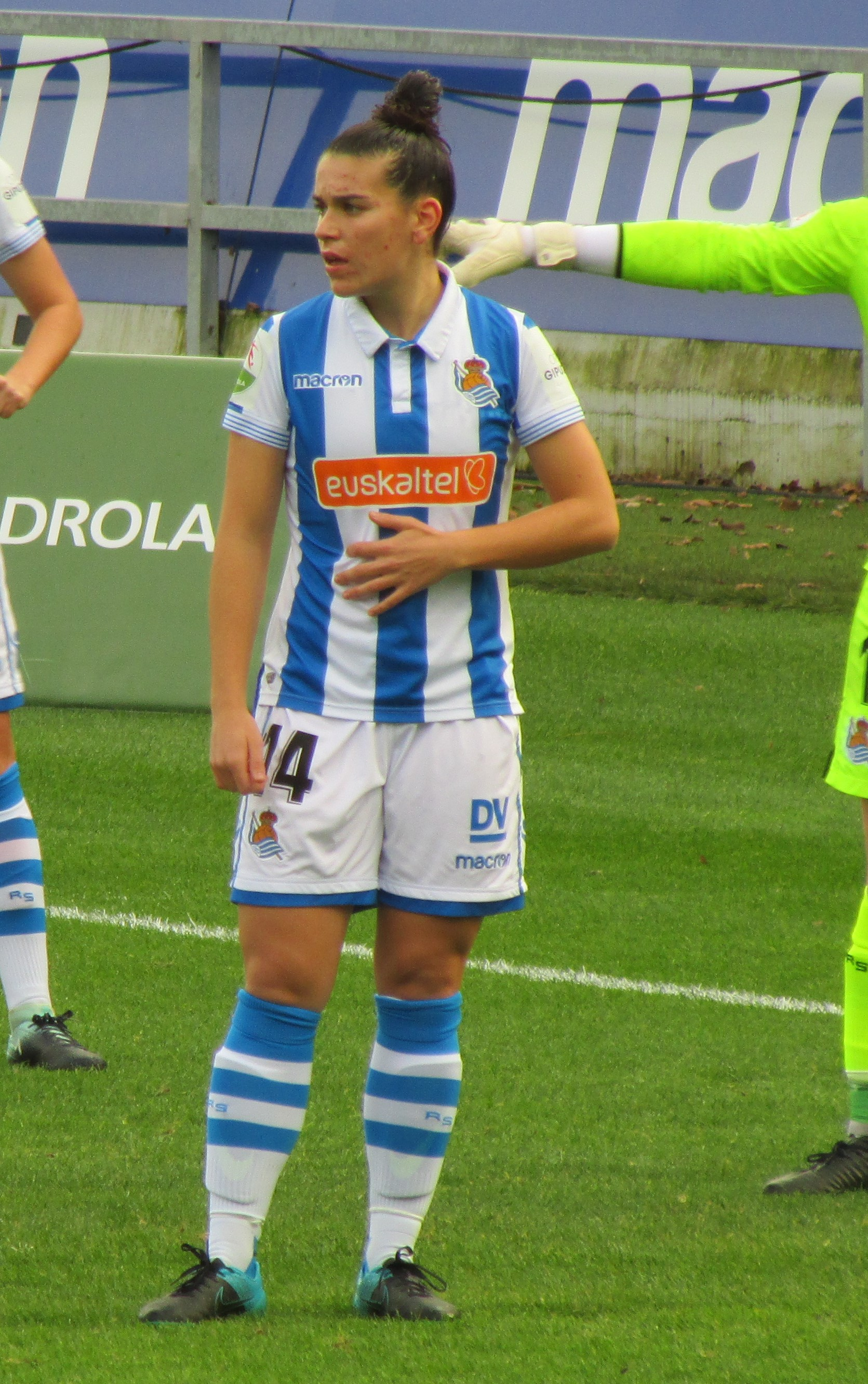
- Baños with Real Sociedad in 2018

Personal information
- Full name: Leire Baños Indakoetxea
- Date of birth: 29 November 1996 (age 29)
- Place of birth: Irun, Spain
- Height: 1.66 m (5 ft 5 in)
- Positions: Midfielder; defender

Team information
- Current team: Athletic Club
- Number: 12

Youth career
- 2007–2009: Dunboa-Eguzkin
- 2009–2012: Irun Artía

Senior career*
Years	Team	Apps	(Gls)
2012–2013	Oiartzun		
2013–2021	Real Sociedad	204	(7)
2021–2024	Levante	84	(6)
2024–	Athletic Club	28	(0)

International career^{‡}
2014–2015	Spain U19	16	(1)
2014–	Basque Country	5	(0)
- * Club domestic league appearances and goals as of 25 July 2025 ‡ National team caps and goals as of 20:39, 16 December 2023 (UTC)

Leire Baños Indakoetxea (born 29 November 1996) is a Spanish footballer who plays for Athletic Club in Liga F, mainly as a midfielder. She previously played for Real Sociedad and Levante.

== Club career ==
Baños began her senior career at Oiartzun aged 15, soon being signed by Real Sociedad who added her to their squad immediately – although she was often introduced as a substitute, which was the case for around 25% of the 200 or so Primera División fixtures she played for the San Sebastián side across eight seasons. She played the entirety of the final and claimed an assist for the winning goal as Erreala claimed their first major honour, the Copa de la Reina in 2018–19, beating Atlético Madrid, and played an important role in two regional Copa Euskal Herria wins over local rivals Athletic Club in 2019 and 2020.

Having agreed a new contract with Real Sociedad in 2019 to run until 2021, Baños left upon the expiry of that deal and signed for fellow top tier club Levante. In the 2022–23 season, the Valencia-based side finished third and qualified for the UEFA Women's Champions League (they were eliminated in its first round by FC Twente); in 2023–24 they missed out on the same Liga F placing by a margin of one point behind Atlético.

In June 2024 she joined Athletic Club on a three-year contract.

== International career ==
At international level, Baños was a member of the Spain under-19 squads that finished runners-up in consecutive editions of the UEFA Women's Under-19 Championship (2014 in Norway and 2015 in Israel), featuring in both finals. She has also been selected for the unofficial Basque Country women's national football team which plays only occasionally.

== Honors ==
Real Sociedad

- Copa de la Reina: 2018–19

Spain U19

- UEFA Women's Under-19 Championship runner-up: 2014, 2015
