= Urru =

Spanish footballer (born 2000)

Personal information
- Full name: Irati Urruzola Bermúdez
- Date of birth: 3 January 2000 (age 26)
- Place of birth: Lasarte-Oria, Spain
- Position: Defender

Team information
- Current team: Osasuna

Senior career*
Years	Team	Apps	(Gls)
2014–2016	Añorga B		
2016–2017	Añorga		
2017–2020	Athletic Club B	61	(2)
2020–2022	Alavés	38	(4)
2022–	Osasuna	8	(1)

International career^{‡}
2022–	Basque Country	1	(0)
- * Club domestic league appearances and goals as of 22:44, 16 December 2023 (UTC) ‡ National team caps and goals as of 22:44, 16 December 2023 (UTC)

Irati Urruzola Bermúdez (born 3 January 2000) is a Spanish footballer who plays as a defender for Osasuna.

== Club career ==
Urru started her career at Añorga. She spent three years with Athletic Club B and two with Alavés.

She has been selected for the unofficial Basque Country women's national football team which plays only occasionally, making her first appearance in December 2022 against Chile.
