= Naiara Beristain =

Spanish footballer (born 1992)

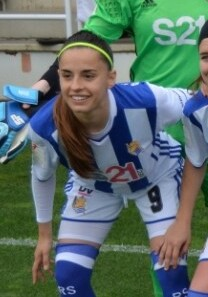
- Beristain with Real Sociedad, 2017

Personal information
- Full name: Naiara Beristain González
- Date of birth: 4 January 1992 (age 34)
- Place of birth: Getxo, Spain
- Height: 1.58 m (5 ft 2 in)
- Position: Midfielder

Youth career
- 2006–2007: Leioa

Senior career*
Years	Team	Apps	(Gls)
2007–2010	Athletic Club B	41	(11)
2008–2012	Athletic Club	76	(11)
2012–2014	Real Sociedad	60	(7)
2014–2016	Valencia	51	(3)
2016–2018	Real Sociedad	57	(6)
2018–2020	Valencia	18	(1)

International career
2010–2011	Spain U19	11	(5)
2014–	Basque Country	5	(3)
- * Club domestic league appearances and goals as of 1 August 2020

Naiara Beristain González (born 4 January 1992) is a Spanish footballer who plays as a midfielder.

== Club career ==
Beristain made her debut in the Primera División with Athletic Club in 2009, aged 16. In 2012, she signed with Real Sociedad, becoming the first female player to move in that direction between the local rival clubs.

She left the Basque Country to join Valencia in 2014, but returned to Real Sociedad two years later. She moved to Valencia again in 2018 on a two-year contract.

== International career ==
She participated in the 2011 Under-19 Euro, where she scored an equalizer in Spain's first match against the Netherlands.

== Honours ==
Athletic Bilbao

- Copa de la Reina: runner-up 2012

Valencia

- Copa de la Reina: runner-up 2015
