= María Díaz Cirauqui =

Spanish footballer (born 1995)

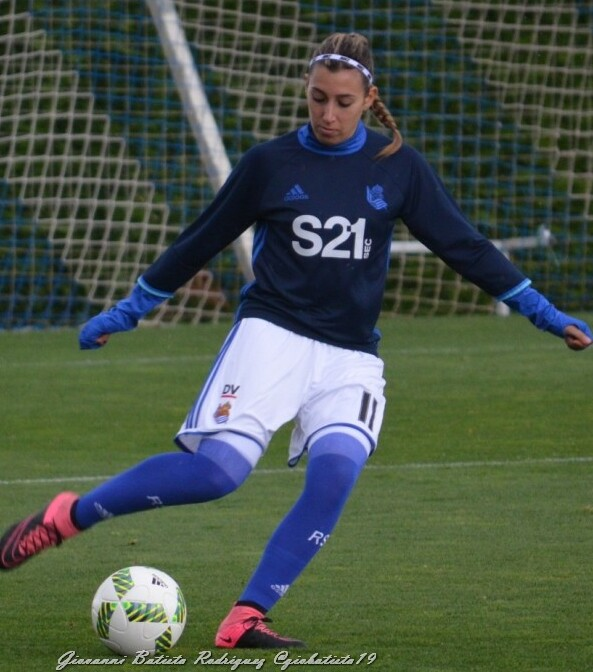
- Díaz Cirauqui warming up for Real Sociedad, 2017

Personal information
- Full name: María Díaz Cirauqui
- Date of birth: 5 May 1995 (age 31)
- Place of birth: Funes, Spain
- Height: 1.63 m (5 ft 4 in)
- Position: Forward

Team information
- Current team: Al-Ittihad
- Number: 8

Senior career*
Years	Team	Apps	(Gls)
2017–2021	Athletic Club	94	(7)
2021–2022	FC Fleury 91	13	(1)
2022–2024	Dijon	31	(3)
2024–2025	Al-Shabab	8	(1)
2025–	Al-Ittihad		

International career
- Basque Country
- * Club domestic league appearances and goals

María Díaz Cirauqui (born 5 May 1995) is a Spanish footballer who plays as a midfielder for Saudi Women's Premier League club Al-Ittihad.

== Career ==
In 2010, Díaz Cirauqui signed for Spanish second tier side Osasuna. In 2014, she signed for Real Sociedad in the Spanish top flight. In 2021, she signed for French club Fleury.
