= Sandra Ramajo =

Spanish footballer (born 1987)

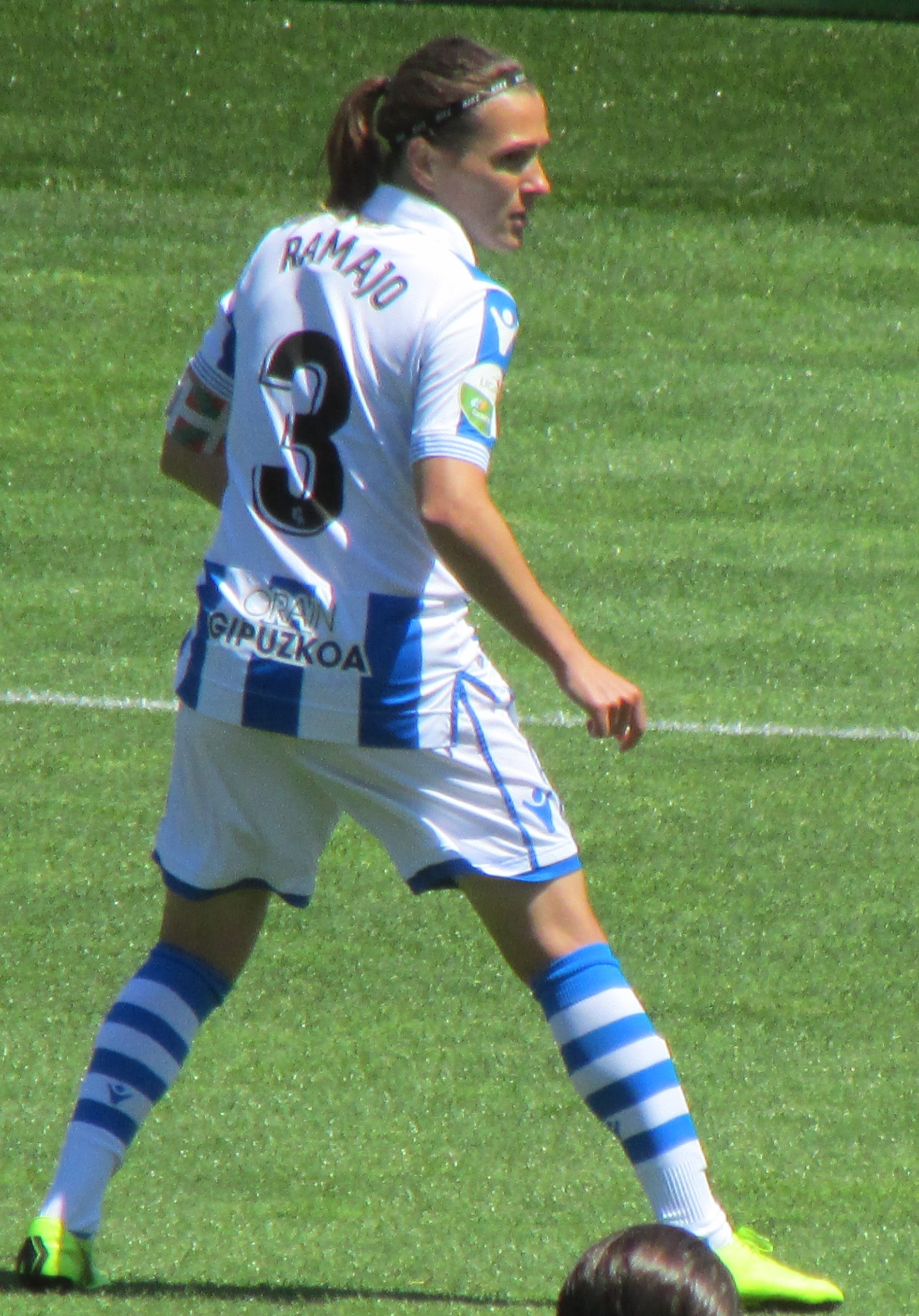

Personal information
- Full name: Sandra Ramajo Moreno
- Date of birth: 17 August 1987 (age 39)
- Place of birth: Guipúzcoa, Spain
- Height: 1.64 m (5 ft 5 in)
- Position: Defender

Sandra Ramajo (born 17 August 1987) is a Spanish footballer who played as a defender for Real Sociedad.

== Career ==
Ramajo began her football career at Real Sociedad in 2008 as a defender. In the 2018 season, she was injured by rupturing anterior cruciate ligament of his left knee, which forced her to undergo surgery which prevented her from playing for six months. Although she was injured, she recovered before the Copa de la Reina final in 2019, during which Ramajo made the substitute bench, although she did not play. Sociedad won the final and received a winners medal.

Ramajo played 286 games before retiring after 11 seasons at Real Sociedad in 2019.

== Honours ==
Real Sociedad

- Copa de la Reina: 2019
