= Yulema Corres =

Spanish footballer (born 1992)

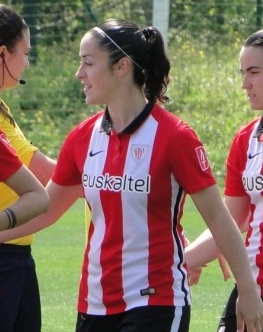
- Corres in 2016

Personal information
- Full name: Yulema Corres Somovilla
- Date of birth: 7 March 1992 (age 34)
- Place of birth: Vitoria-Gasteiz, Spain
- Height: 1.70 m (5 ft 7 in)
- Position: Forward

Youth career
- CDF Gasteiz Cup

Senior career*
| Years | Team | Apps | (Gls) |
| 2006–2014 | Aurrera Vitoria | | |
| 2014–2024 | Athletic Club | 192 | (65) |

International career
| 2014–2019 | Basque Country | 5 | (1) |
- * Club domestic league appearances and goals as of 17 June 2024

Yulema Corres (born 7 March 1992) is a Spanish retired footballer who played as a forward, mainly for Liga F club Athletic Club.

== Career ==
Corres signed with Athletic in 2014 after having scored 29 goals with Aurrera Vitoria the previous season (top-scorer of Segunda División, Group 2).

She retired as a player ten years later aged 32, having made 203 official appearances for the club in all competitions and scored 67 goals (15th and 6th place respectively in Athletic's historical rankings at that time). She was honoured with a farewell ceremony and a last starting appearance - along with fellow departing veterans Garazi Murua and Eunate Arraiza - on the final matchday of the 2023–24 Liga F season, in which Athletic defeated Sevilla 2–1 at San Mamés.

== Honours ==
Athletic Club

- Primera División: 2015–16
