= Cecilia Marcos =

Spanish footballer (born 2001)

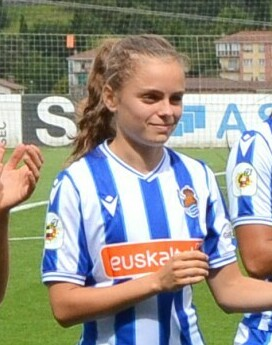
- Marcos with Real Sociedad in 2021

Personal information
- Full name: Cecilia Marcos Nabal
- Date of birth: 3 November 2001 (age 25)
- Place of birth: San Sebastián, Spain
- Height: 1.58 m (5 ft 2 in)
- Positions: Forward; midfielder

Team information
- Current team: Real Sociedad
- Number: 11

Youth career
- 2015–2016: Añorga

Senior career*
Years	Team	Apps	(Gls)
2016–2017	Añorga B		
2017–2019	Añorga		
2019–	Real Sociedad	114	(14)

International career^{‡}
2022	Spain U23	1	(0)
2022–	Basque Country	1	(0)
- * Club domestic league appearances and goals as of 20:30, 21 October 2026 (UTC) ‡ National team caps and goals as of 09:07, 17 December 2023 (UTC)

Cecilia Marcos Nabal (born 3 November 2001) is a Spanish professional footballer who plays as a forward or midfielder for Liga F club Real Sociedad.

== Career ==
Marcos started her club career at Añorga. Her time at Real Sociedad has been disrupted by injuries to her anterior cruciate ligament (damaging her left knee in September 2021 then her right knee in January 2023) requiring lengthy rehabilitation. Despite these prolonged absences, in June 2023 she agreed a new contract running to 2025.

She has been selected for the unofficial Basque Country women's national team which plays only occasionally, making her first appearance in December 2022 against Chile.
