= Arturo Ruiz =

Arturo Ruiz may refer to:

- Arturo Ruiz-Castillo (1910–1994), Spanish screenwriter and film director
- Arturo Ruiz de Gamboa (1882–?), Chilean lawyer and politician
- Arturo Ruiz López, Spanish badminton player, competed in the 2003 IBF World Championships – Men's singles
- Arturo Ruiz Maffei (fl. 1930s), Chilean politician
