= Nerea Eizagirre =

Spanish footballer (born 2000)

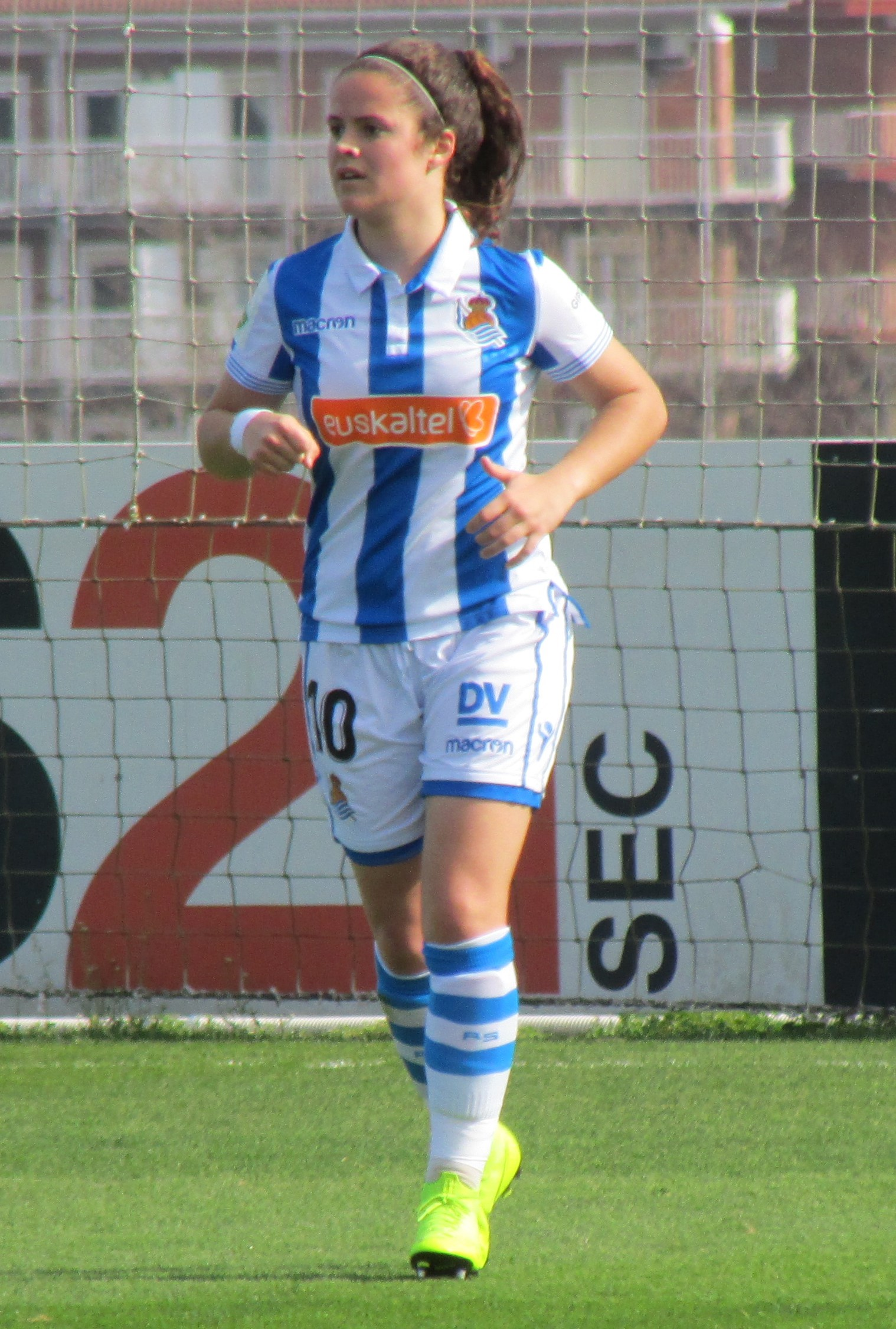
- Eizagirre playing for Real Sociedad

Personal information
- Full name: Nerea Eizagirre (Note: Her surname is spelled as 'Eizaguirre' by UEFA but as 'Eizagirre' by La Liga. The player herself uses the latter spelling on social media.) Lasa
- Date of birth: 4 January 2000 (age 26)
- Place of birth: Tolosa, Spain
- Height: 1.64 m (5 ft 5 in)
- Position: Midfielder

Team information
- Current team: Real Sociedad
- Number: 10

Senior career*
Years	Team	Apps	(Gls)
- Añorga
2016–	Real Sociedad	187	(47)

International career^{‡}
2016–2017	Spain U17	8	(3)
2017–2019	Spain U19	15	(0)
2020–2022	Spain	10	(2)
2022–	Basque Country	1	(1)
Medal record
Women's football
Representing Spain
UEFA Women's Under-19 Championship
First place	2018 Switzerland
- * Club domestic league appearances and goals as of 08:22, 17 December 2023 (UTC) ‡ National team caps and goals as of 08:22, 17 December 2023 (UTC)

Nerea Eizagirre Lasa (born 4 January 2000) is a Spanish professional footballer who plays as a midfielder for Liga F club Real Sociedad and the Spain women's national team.

== Club career ==
Eizagirre was playing for Añorga prior to joining Real Sociedad aged 16. She was a member of the group which won the 2018–19 Copa de la Reina and finished as runners-up in the 2021–22 Primera División. In November 2023, now club captain, she made her 200th appearance for the Txuri-urdin aged 23.

== International career ==
Eizagirre played for the Spain under-17 team at the 2016 Euros in Belarus (they were beaten in the final by Germany via a penalty shootout), the 2016 World Cup in Jordan (bronze medallists) and the 2017 Euros in the Czech Republic (beaten on penalties by Germany in the final again). She then moved up to the under-19s, claiming a winner's medal from the 2018 Euros in Switzerland and also playing in the 2019 Euros in Scotland (Spain were eliminated in the semi-finals by winners France, with the scheduled 2020 Under-20 World Cup in Central America for which they had qualified later cancelled due to the COVID-19 pandemic).

Following some good form for her club including several goals, Eizagirre earned a call-up to the senior Spain squad in October 2020. She made her debut against the Czech Republic, coming on as a substitute for Esther González. She was among Las 15, a group of players who made themselves unavailable for international selection in September 2022 due to their dissatisfaction with head coach Jorge Vilda, and one of the dozen who were not involved 11 months later as Spain won the World Cup.

She has also been selected for the unofficial Basque Country women's national football team which plays only occasionally, making her first appearance in December 2022 against Chile in which she opened the scoring.

== International goals ==
Nerea Eizagirre – goals for Spain
No.	Date	Venue	Opponent	Score	Result	Competition
1.	18 February 2021	ASK Arena, Baku, Azerbaijan	Azerbaijan	11–0	13–0	UEFA Women's Euro 2022 qualifying
2.	26 October 2021	Kolos Stadium, Kovalivka, Ukraine	Ukraine	3–0	6–0	2023 FIFA Women's World Cup qualification

Nerea Eizagirre – goals for Basque Country
#	Date	Venue	Opponent	Score	Result	Competition
1.	20 December 2022	Campo José Luis Orbegozo, San Sebastián	Chile	1–0	3–0	Friendly
