= Manuela Lareo =

Dominican footballer (born 1992)

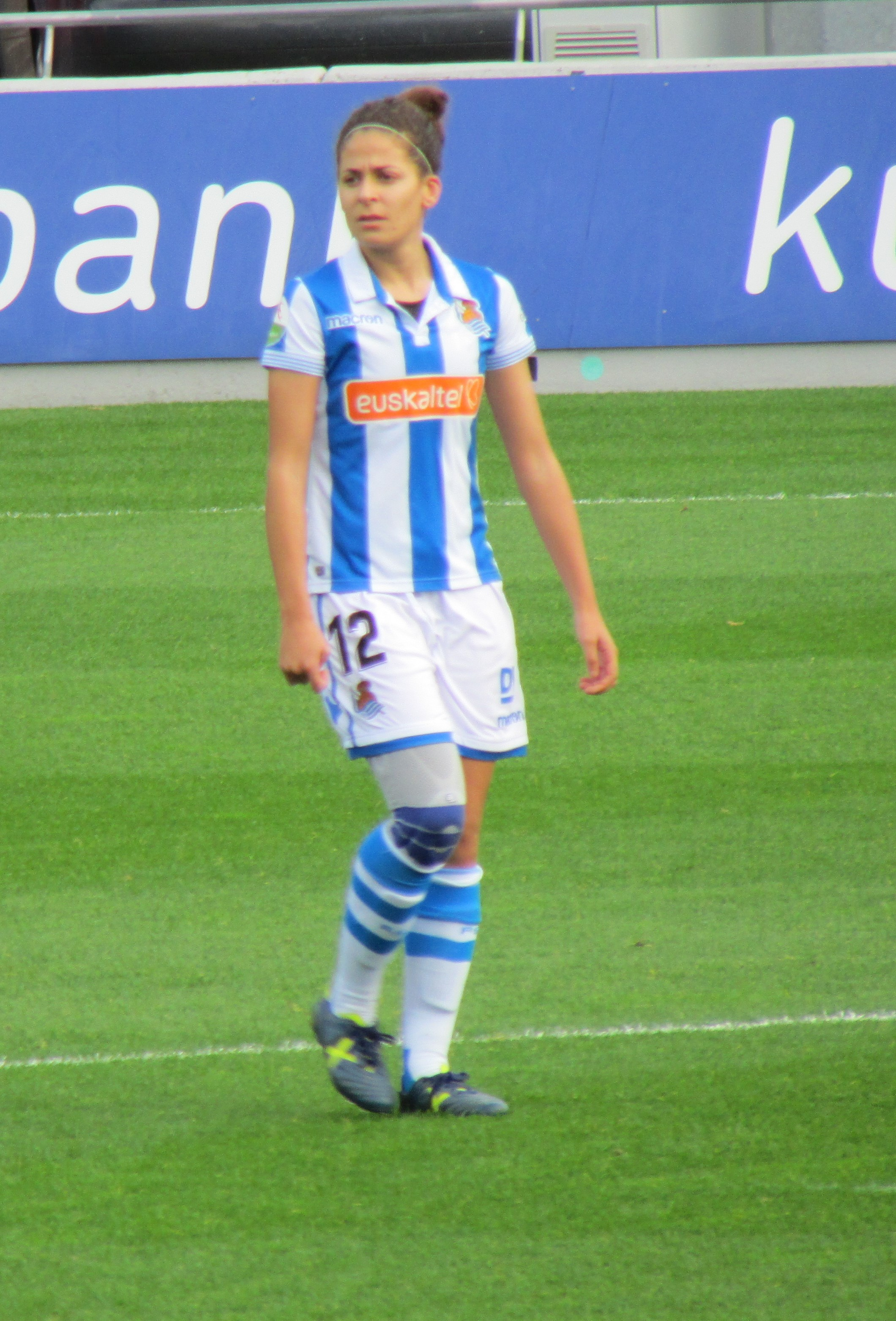
- Lareo in 2018

Personal information
- Full name: Manuela Lareo Polanco
- Date of birth: 29 May 1992 (age 34)
- Place of birth: Vitoria, Spain
- Height: 1.68 m (5 ft 6 in)
- Positions: Left attacking midfielder; forward

Team information
- Current team: Dominican Republic Women (technical assistant)

Youth career
- 2006–2010: Aurrerá Vitoria

Senior career*
Years	Team	Apps	(Gls)
2010–2014	Athletic Bilbao	79	(25)
2014–2015	Valencia	27	(4)
2015–2021	Real Sociedad	123	(14)
2021–2022	Espanyol	0	(0)

International career^{‡}
2010	Spain U19	6	(3)
2021–2022	Dominican Republic	8	(3)
2015–2017	Basque Country	3	(0)

Managerial career
- Dominican Republic Women (technical assistant)
- * Club domestic league appearances and goals as of 20 June 2021. ‡ National team caps and goals as of 7 July 2021.

Manuela “Manu” Lareo Polanco (born 29 May 1992) is a football manager and former player who played as a left attacking midfielder. Born in Spain to a Dominican mother, she capped for the Dominican Republic women's national team, which she is the current technical assistant.

== Early life ==
Lareo was born in Vitoria-Gasteiz to a Spanish father and a Dominican mother.

== Club career ==
Lareo is a CD Aurrerá de Vitoria product. She has played for Athletic Bilbao, Valencia CF and Real Sociedad in Spain.

== International career ==
Lareo represented Spain at the 2010 UEFA Women's Under-19 Championship. In December 2015, she played for the Basque Country in a 1–1 draw with Catalonia at Mini Estadi. On 30 June 2021, she was called up by the Dominican Republic.

== Honours ==
Real Sociedad

- Copa de la Reina: 2018–19

Athletic Bilbao

- Copa de la Reina: runner-up 2012

Valencia

- Copa de la Reina: runner-up 2015
