= Mariasun Quiñones =

Spanish footballer (born 1996)

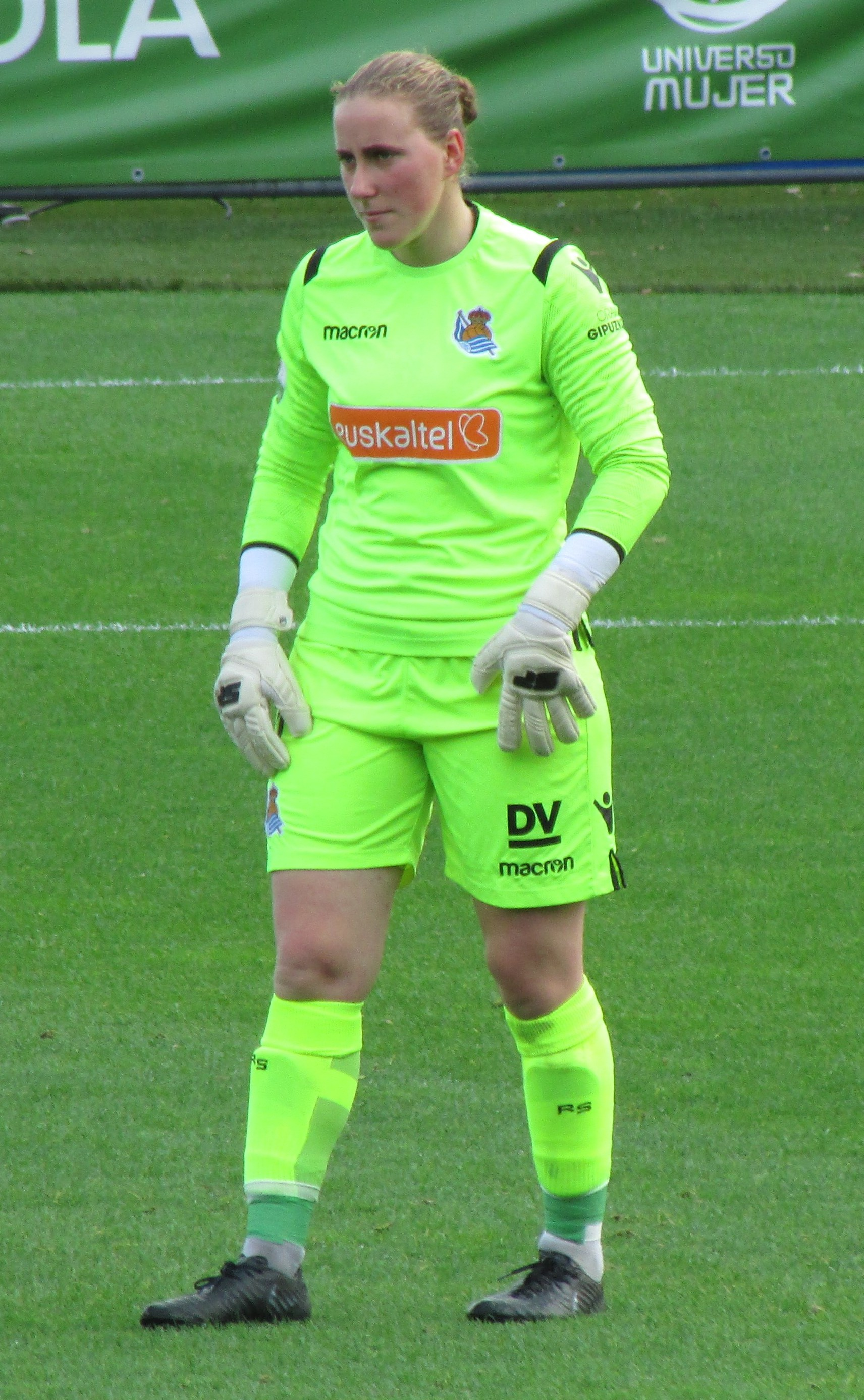
- Quiñones with Real Sociedad in 2018

Personal information
- Full name: María Asunción Quiñones Goikoetxea
- Date of birth: 29 October 1996 (age 30)
- Place of birth: Hondarribia, Spain
- Height: 1.72 m (5 ft 8 in)
- Position: Goalkeeper

Team information
- Current team: FOMGET
- Number: 29

Youth career
- Hondarribia
- 2011–2013: Mariño

Senior career*
Years	Team	Apps	(Gls)
2013–2014	Mariño		
2014–2021	Real Sociedad	147	(0)
2021–2025	Athletic Bilbao	63	(0)
2025–	FOMGET	0	(0)

International career^{‡}
2016	Spain U20	4	(0)
2017–	Spain	3	(0)
2015–	Basque Country	2	(0)
- * Club domestic league appearances and goals as of 25 July 2025 ‡ National team caps and goals as of 11 October 2022

María Asunción "Mariasun" Quiñones Goikoetxea (born 29 October 1996) is a Spanish professional footballer who plays as a goalkeeper for Turkish Women's Football Super League club FOMGET and the Spain women's national team.

== Career ==
Quiñones began her career with local club Mariño (Irun), moving to Real Sociedad in 2014 at the age of 18, where she soon became the regular starting goalkeeper ahead of Cris Cornejo. She transferred to Athletic in the summer of 2021, along with club teammate Itxaso Uriarte, and departed in 2025, having lost her place in the stating lineup to her former Real Sociedad understudy Adriana Nanclares.

Quiñones made her senior international debut for Spain in 2017. She was involved in several squads, including for the UEFA Women's Euro 2017 and the 2019 FIFA Women's World Cup without making an appearance at either tournament.

Her twin sister Nekane is also a footballer, playing in midfield for teams playing at regional levels including Oiartzun and Añorga.

== Honours ==
Real Sociedad

- Copa de la Reina: 2019

Spain

- Algarve Cup: 2017
- Cyprus Cup: 2018
