= Nuria Ligero =

Spanish footballer (born 1991)

Personal information
- Full name: Nuria Ligero Fernández
- Date of birth: 4 September 1991 (age 35)
- Place of birth: Seville, Spain
- Height: 1.57 m (5 ft 2 in)
- Position: Defender

Team information
- Current team: Real Betis
- Number: 11

Senior career*
Years	Team	Apps	(Gls)
2007–2014	Sevilla	106+	(1+)
2014–	Real Betis	183+	(1+)
- * Club domestic league appearances and goals as of 13:54, 7 May 2023 (UTC)

Nuria Ligero Fernández (born 4 September 1991), also known as Nana, is a Spanish footballer who plays as a defender for Real Betis.

== Club career ==
Nana started her career at Sevilla. In 2014, she moved over to rival club Real Betis. At Betis, Nana takes on the additional role of being coordinator of their youth academy, in particular, working with those players that have long-term injuries.

== Personal life ==
Nana earned her nickname due to the fact that she was one of three players called Nuria in her football team when she started playing. Prior to turning professional, Nana worked as a personal trainer alongside her football career. She also has a degree from INEF.
