= Antonio Toledo (football manager) =

Spanish football manager (born 1967)

Antonio Toledo Sánchez (born 9 December 1967) is a Spanish football manager.

== Early life ==
Toledo was born in 1957 in Huelva, Spain.

== Career ==
Toledo has managed the most Spanish women's top flight games.

== Personal life ==
Toledo has been married.
