= Garazi Murua =

Spanish footballer

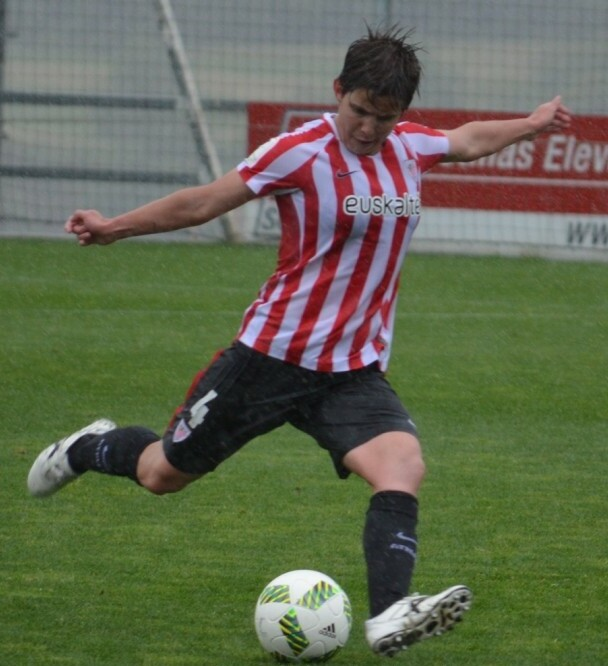
- Murua in 2017

Personal information
- Full name: Garazi Murua Astorkiza
- Date of birth: 24 January 1995 (age 31)
- Place of birth: Getxo, Spain
- Height: 1.67 m (5 ft 6 in)
- Position: Defender

Youth career
- 2008–2010: Bizkerre

College career
Years	Team	Apps	(Gls)
2014	ETSU Buccaneers		

Senior career*
Years	Team	Apps	(Gls)
2010–2015	Athletic Club B	89	(8)
2014–2024	Athletic Club	168	(4)
Total		257	(12)

International career
2012	Spain U17	1	(0)
2013–2014	Spain U19	8	(0)
- * Club domestic league appearances and goals

Garazi Murua Astorkiza (born 24 January 1995) is a Spanish retired footballer who played as a defender. Her only professional team was Athletic Club, where she was the captain for several seasons.

== Club career ==
Murua started her career in Bizkerre's academy. In 2014 she spent one semester in the United States playing with the ETSU Buccaneers (East Tennessee State University) as part of a degree in economics she was undertaking at the University of the Basque Country. Soon after returning to Bilbao, she made her Primera División debut for Athletic, and in her first full season – 2015–16 – the club finished as national champions.

A back injury sustained before the start of the 2022–23 season caused her to miss all of the campaign. Having agreed a one-year contract extension in the hope of returning to full fitness, she was named among the substitutes for 13 league and cup fixtures towards the end of 2023–24 but never made a competitive comeback, retiring as a player in June 2024 aged 29. She was honoured with a farewell ceremony and a last starting appearance - along with fellow departing veterans Yulema Corres and Eunate Arraiza - on the final matchday of the season, in which Athletic defeated Sevilla 2–1 at San Mamés.
