= Zubieta Facilities =

Football training ground in Spain

Coordinates: 43°15′30″N 02°01′31″W

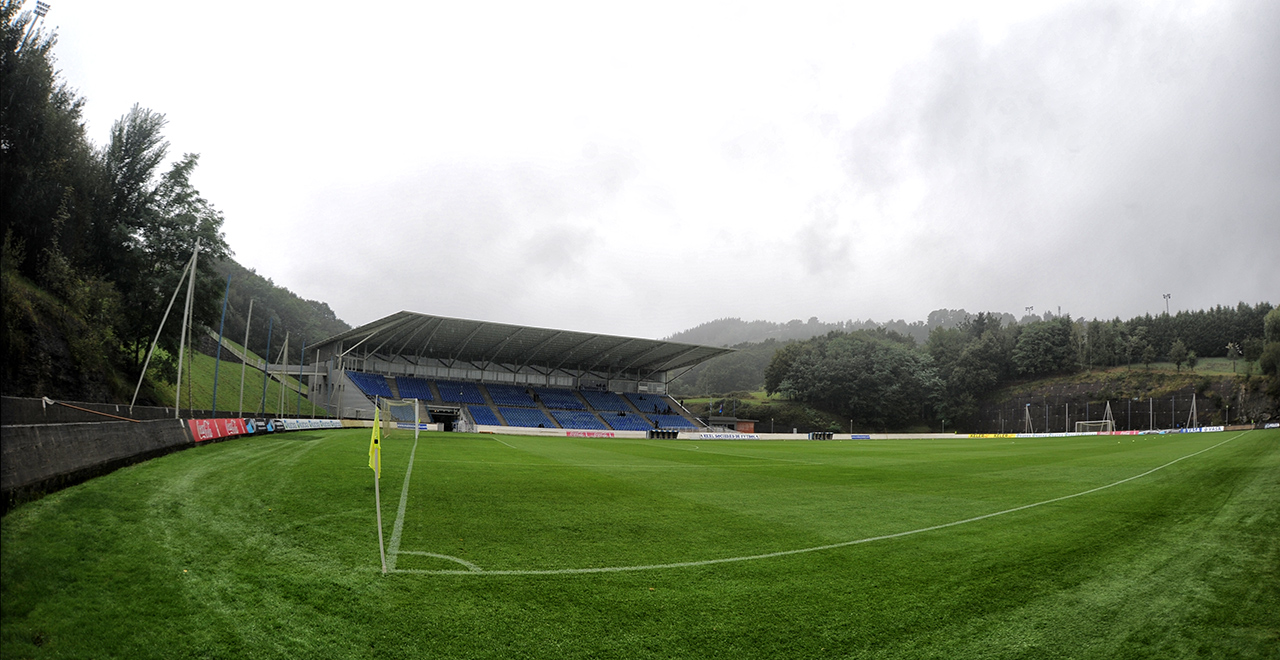
- Campo José Luis Orbegozo at Zubieta
- Interactive map of Zubieta Facilities
- Location: Zubieta, San Sebastián; Basque Country
- Owner: Real Sociedad
- Capacity: 2500
- Type: Football training ground

Construction
- Built: 1981 (initial); 1 April 2004 (refurbished)
- Cost: 12.85 million €

Tenants
- Real Sociedad (training) (1981-); Real Sociedad B (1981); Real Sociedad Femenino (2004); Real Sociedad C (2016); Real Sociedad cantera (1981)

Website
- Zubieta Facilities

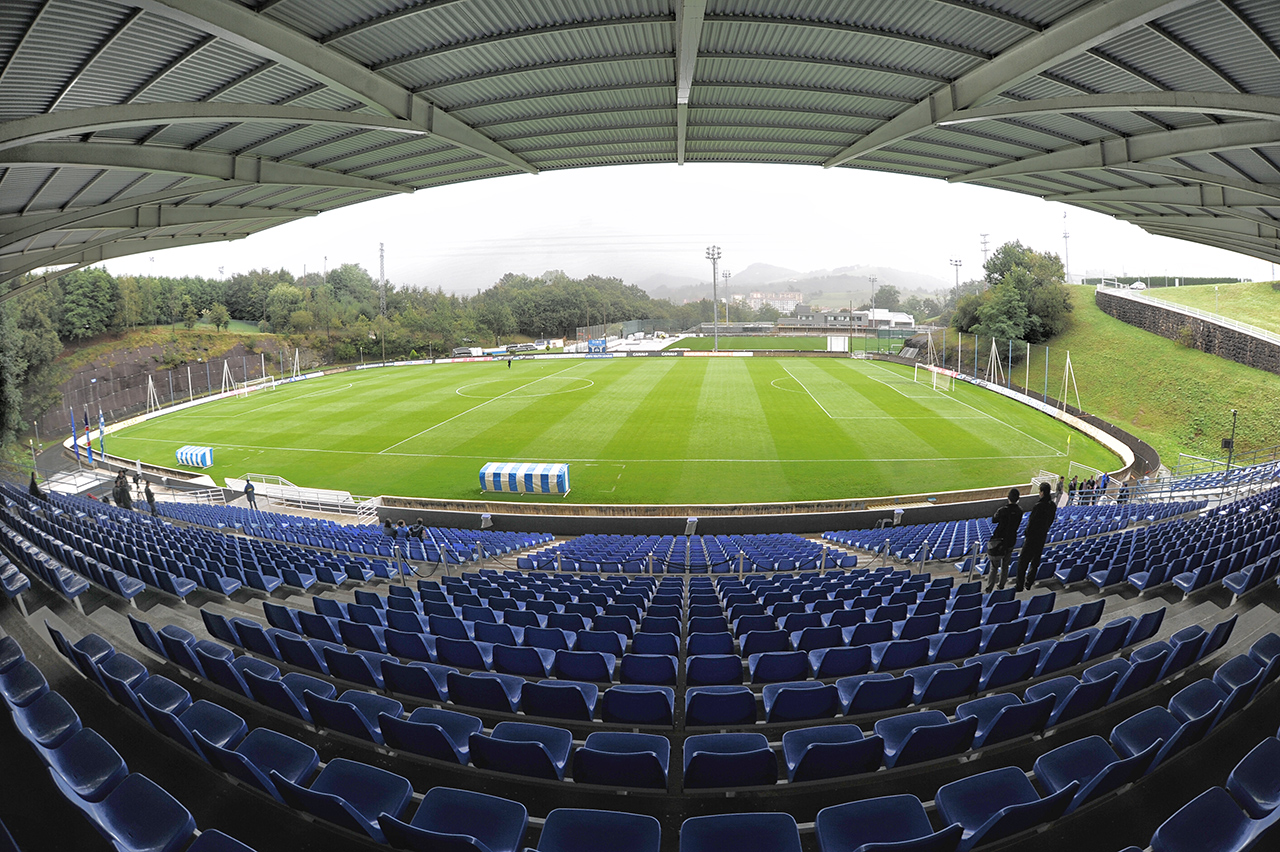
Zubieta Facilities

The Zubieta Facilities (Basque: Zubietako Kirol-instalakuntzak, Spanish: Instalaciones de Zubieta), is the training ground of the Primera Division club Real Sociedad. Located in Zubieta, an enclave of San Sebastian (adjacent to the San Sebastián Hippodrome), it was opened in 2004 in its modernised form, although was originally inaugurated in 1981.

Occupying an area of 70,000 m^{2}, it was designed by architect Izaskun Larzábal.

== Facilities ==
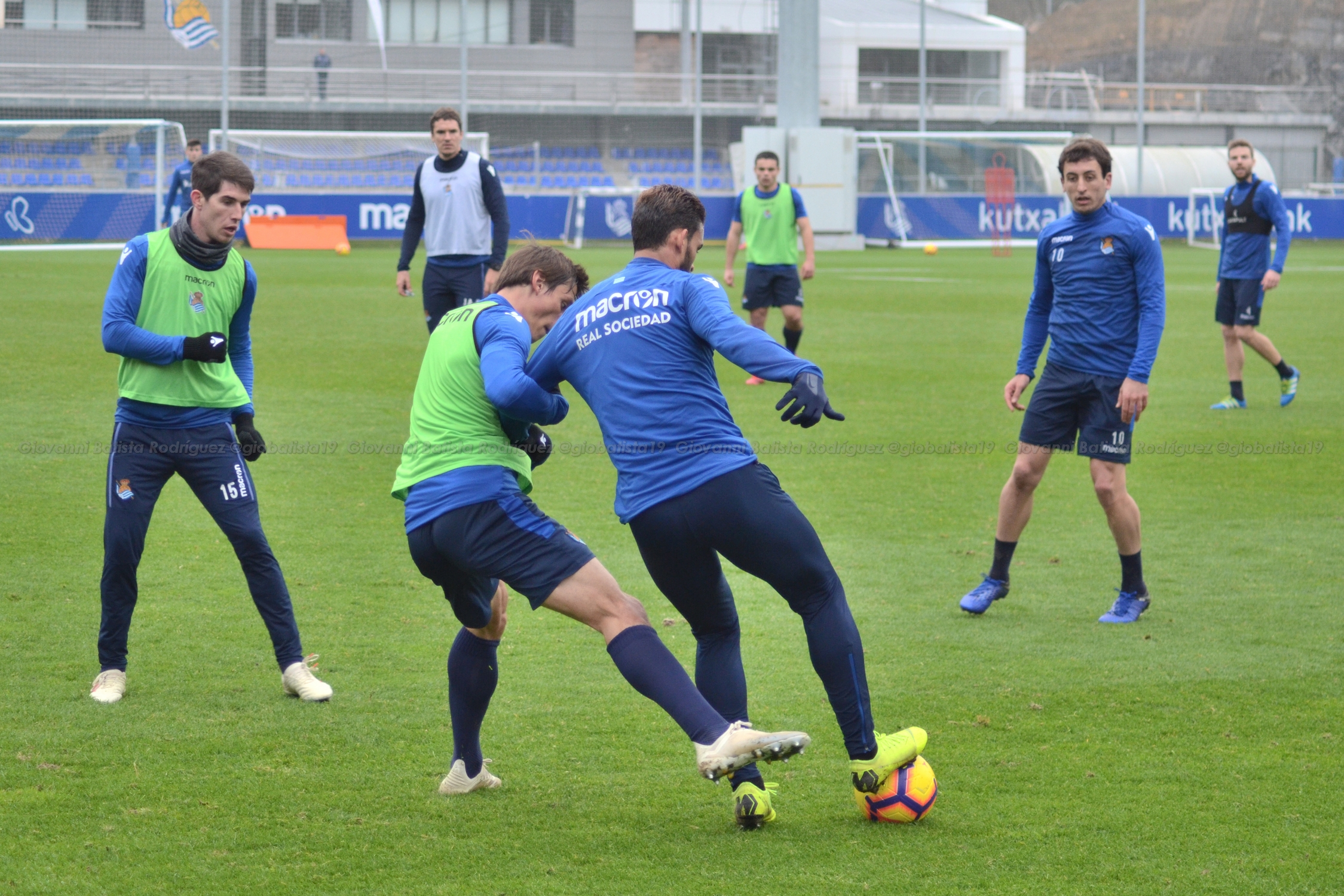
Real Sociedad players training at Zubieta, 2018

- Campo José Luis Orbegozo with a capacity of 2,500 seats is the main stadium of the Zubieta Facilities and home to the cantera teams.
- Estadio Izan: A grass pitch with a grandstand of a capacity for 4,000 people, home of Real Sociedad B, the reserve team of Real Sociedad, and Real Sociedad Femenino.
- 2 grass pitches used by the club's youth teams - the Zubieta name is often used as a metonym to refer to the academy system.
- 2 artificial pitches.
- 2 mini grass pitches.
- Service centre with gymnasium.
