= Real Sociedad Femenino =

Spanish football team

Real Sociedad
- Full name: Real Sociedad de Fútbol, S.A.D.
- Nicknames: Txuri-urdin (white-blue); Erreala; La Real
- Founded: 19 September 2004; 22 years ago
- Stadium: Instalaciones Zubieta
- Capacity: 1,500
- President: Jokin Aperribay
- Head coach: Gorka Álvarez
- League: Liga F
- 2025–26: Liga F, 3rd
- Website: realsociedad.eus/femenino
Home colours	Away colours	Third colours

Real Sociedad Femenino is the women's football section of Real Sociedad de Fútbol currently playing in Spain's top league Liga F.

== History ==
Founded on 19 September 2004, Real Sociedad reached the first division after two promotions in its two first seasons ever, and occupying the place of dissolved Estudiantes de Huelva.

After a ninth position in their first season, the club quickly consolidated in the top flight. In 2011, Real Sociedad reached the semifinals of the Copa de la Reina for the first time.

In February 2019, a Basque derby league fixture hosted by Real Sociedad against Athletic Bilbao, which would usually be held at the club's Zubieta training centre, was played at the Anoeta Stadium, attracting an attendance of 21,234 (the result was a 2–2 draw). The following week, the same venue hosted a semi-final of the Copa de la Reina in which Real defeated Sevilla 3–1 in front of 18,731 fans to reach the final of the competition for the first time. On 11 May 2019, the club achieved their first ever major trophy by beating Atlético Madrid 2–1 in the final of the Copa de la Reina, played in Granada. The win granted entry to the newly-established Supercopa de España Femenina, but after overcoming Levante to reach its final, they suffered a humiliating 10–1 defeat to Barcelona. Their first UEFA Women's Champions League tie, after finishing second behind Barcelona in the 2021–22 Primera División, was against FC Bayern of Germany and ended in elimination by a 4–1 aggregate score (Synne Jensen had the distinction of scoring the first European goal). Another Copa de la Reina final was reached in 2024, but this resulted in another heavy loss (8–0) to Barcelona.

=== Reserves ===
The club's B-team, established in 2018, plays in the Primera Nacional (3rd level) having gained promotion from the Gipuzkoa provincial league in their first year of operation and from the Basque regional league a year later. A C-team was launched in 2021.

== Current squad ==
As of 10 July 2026

Note: Flags indicate national team as defined under FIFA eligibility rules; some limited exceptions apply. Players may hold more than one non-FIFA nationality.

No.	Pos.	Nation	Player
1	GK	ESP	Alazne Estensoro
2	DF	ESP	Claudia Florentino
3	DF	ESP	Ainhoa Moraza
4	DF	ESP	Nahia Aparicio
5	MF	ESP	Paula Fernández
6	MF	ESP	Elene Guridi
9	FW	ESP	Mirari Uria
10	MF	ESP	Nerea Eizagirre
11	FW	ESP	Cecilia Marcos
13	GK	ESP	Julia Arrula
14	MF	ESP	Intza Egiguren

No.	Pos.	Nation	Player
17	MF	ESP	Maren Lezeta
19	FW	ESP	Arola Aparicio
20	DF	ESP	María Molina
22	MF	CZE	Klára Cahynová
24	DF	ESP	Aiara Agirrezabala
—	FW	ESP	Ainhoa Marín
—	MF	ESP	Ainoa Campo
—	FW	ESP	Laura Camino
—	MF	ESP	Elene Guridi
—	DF	ESP	Esther Laborde
—	FW	CHI	Sonya Keefe

== Titles ==
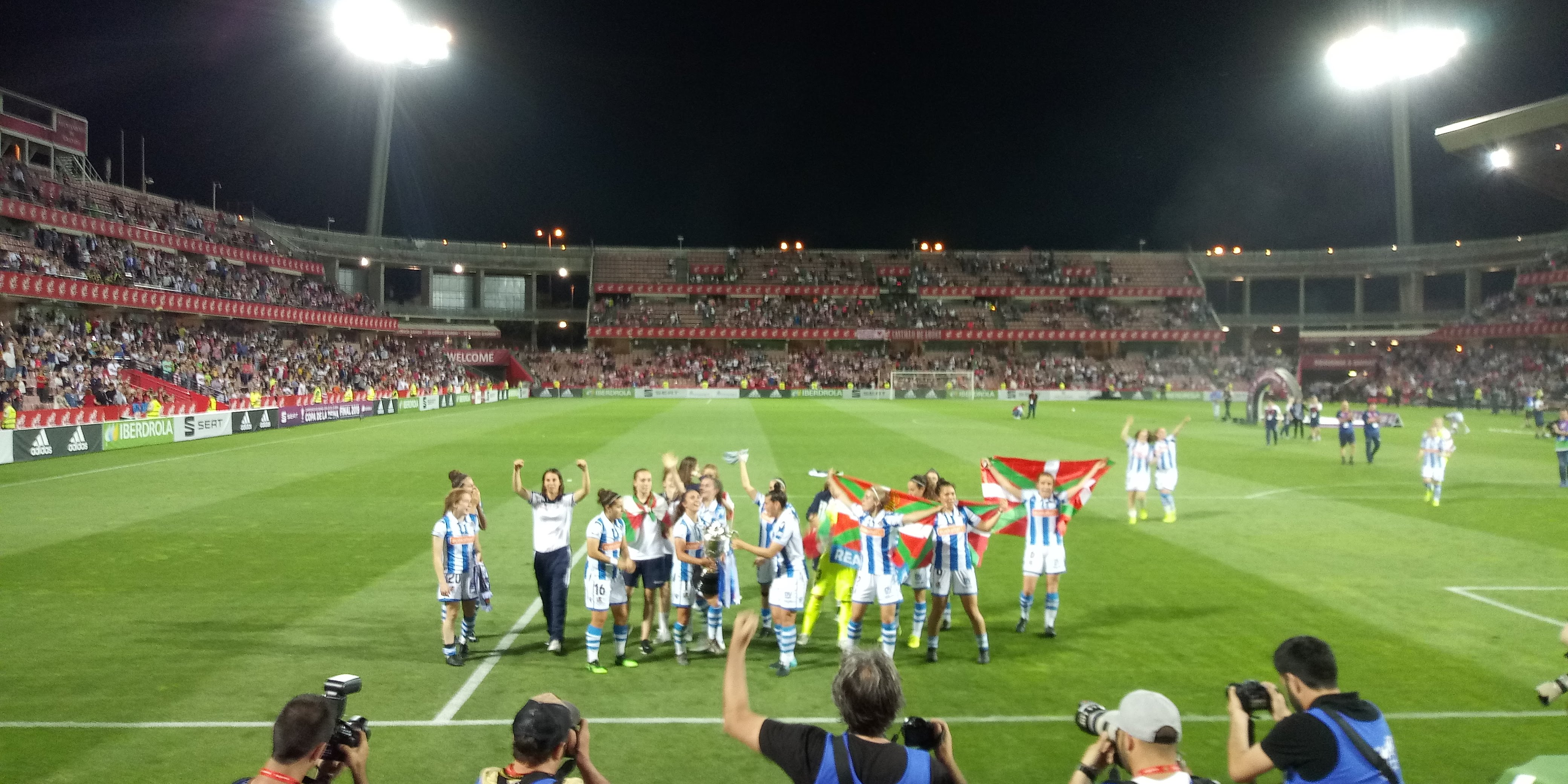
Real Sociedad players celebrating the Copa de la Reina won in 2019.

=== Official ===
- Copa de la Reina: 2019
- Euskal Herria Cup: 2012, 2019, 2020, 2022

=== Invitational ===
- Sport Mundi Tournament: 2005, 2008

== Season by season ==
Season	Div.	Pos.	Copa de la Reina	UWCL
2004–05	Reg.	1st		
2005–06	2ª	1st		
2006–07	1ª	9th		
2007–08	1ª	10th		
2008–09	1ª	10th		
2009–10	1ª	7th	First round	
2010–11	1ª	8th	Semi-final	
2011–12	1ª	7th		
2012–13	1ª	10th		
2013–14	1ª	7th	Quarter-final	
2014–15	1ª	11th		
2015–16	1ª	5th	Quarter-final	
2016–17	1ª	8th	Quarter-final	
2017–18	1ª	7th	Quarter-final	
2018–19	1ª	7th	Winners	
2019–20	1ª	6th	Round of 16	
2020–21	1ª	5th	Quarter-final	
2021–22	1ª	2nd	Quarter-final	
2022–23	Liga F	8th	Round of 16	Round 2
2023–24	Liga F	8th	Runners-up	
2024–25	Liga F	7th	Quarter-final	
2025–26	Liga F	3rd	Quarter-final	

== See also ==
- Women's Basque derby
