= List of RCD Espanyol Femenino seasons =

This is a list of seasons played by RCD Espanyol Femenino, the women's section of Spanish football club RCD Espanyol.

== Summary ==
Season	League										Cup	UWCL	Top scorer	
Season	Tier	Div	Pos	Pld	W	D	L	GF	GA	Pts	Cup	UWCL	Name(s)	Goal
1987–88											Qualifying			
1988–89	1	1ª	3rd	16	7	6	3	39	26	20	Quarterfinals			
1989–90	1	1ª	3rd	22						30	Runner-up			
1990–91	2	2ª	5th	8	1	0	7			2	Round of 16			
1991–92	2	2ª	3rd	8	4	0	4	14	16	8				
1992–93	2	2ª	1st	9	7	1	1	55	23	15	Round of 16			
1993–94	1	1ª	5th	16	7	3	6	27	21	17	Round of 16			
1994–95	1	1ª	3rd	18	10	4	4			34	Semifinals			
1995–96	1	1ª	3rd	16	9	3	4	40	29	30	Champion			
1996–97	1	1ª	3rd	26	19	4	3	105	22	65	Champion			
1997–98	1	1ª	3rd	26	19	5	1	119	15	62	Semifinals			
1998–99	1	1ª	1st	27	21	3	3	128	12	66				
1999–00	1	1ª	2nd	24	19	3	2	110	17	60	Round of 16			
2000–01	1	1ª	2nd	26	21	3	2	103	34	66	Quarterfinals			
2001–02	1	1ª	3rd	20	12	1	7	44	23	37	Runner-up			
2002–03	1	1ª	7th	22	10	5	7	67	44	35	Quarterfinals			
2003–04	1	1ª	8th	26	12	2	12	54	57	38				
2004–05	1	1ª	3rd	26	18	3	5	92	46	57	Quarterfinals			
2005–06	1	1ª	1st	24	20	0	4	80	25	60	Champion			
2006–07	1	1ª	2nd	26	20	3	3	87	30	63	Runner-up	Round of 16		
2007–08	1	1ª	4th	26	17	1	8	62	40	52	Quarterfinals		(Spain) Marta Cubí	16
2008–09	1	1ª	4th	30	18	6	6	71	25	60	Champion		(Spain) Adriana Martín	18
2009–10	1	1ª	2nd	28	21	3	4	94	18	66	Champion		(Italy) Pamela Conti	26
2010–11	1	1ª	2nd	30	22	4	4	108	27	70	Runner-up		(Spain) Vero Boquete	39
2011–12	1	1ª	3rd	34	23	7	4	117	38	76	Champion		(Spain) María Paz Vilas	36
2012–13	1	1ª	5th	30	16	6	8	47	25	54	Quarterfinals		(Spain) María Paz Vilas	14
2013–14	1	1ª	11th	30	8	8	14	37	51	32			(Spain) Bárbara Latorre	13
2014–15	1	1ª	7th	30	12	7	11	50	54	43	Quarterfinals		(Spain) Paloma Fernández	12
2015–16	1	1ª	9th	30	10	6	14	28	48	36			(Spain) Anair Lomba	7
2016–17	1	1ª	13th	30	5	8	17	30	60	23			(Spain) Elisa del Estal	7
2017–18	1	1ª	14th	30	7	8	15	22	42	29			(Spain) Cristina Baudet (Spain) Elisa del Estal	4
2018–19	1	1ª	9th	30	9	8	13	31	42	35	Round of 16		(Spain) Elisa del Estal	10
2019–20	1	1ª	16th	21	0	5	16	13	46	5	Round of 16		Three players	2
2020–21	1	1ª	16th	34	6	7	21	31	70	25			(Spain) Cristina Baudet	8
2021–22	2	2ªP	2nd	30	17	7	6	50	34	58	Round of 16			
2022–23	2	2ª	9th	30	10	10	10	38	55	40	Third round			
2023–24	2	2ª	3rd	26	14	6	6	41	23	48	Second round		(Paraguay) Lice Chamorro	10
2024–25	1	1ª	11th	30	7	11	12	29	50	32	Second round		(Paraguay) Lice Chamorro	7
2025–26	1	1ª	11th	30	7	10	13	28	44	31	Round of 16		(Spain) Ainoa Campo (Spain) Ona Baradad	5

== League squad stats by season ==
=== 2010s ===
First season with aps. since ^{S} signing / ^{P} promotion / ^{LI} loan in Last season with aps. before ^{T} transferring out / ^{R} retirement / ^{LO} loan out Both

2013–14 Primera División ^{(11th)}
Goalkeepers	Aps	Gls	Defenders	Aps	Gls	Midfielders	Aps	Gls	Forwards	Aps	Gls
(Portugal) Jamila Marreiros ^{S T}	26	0	(Spain) Mapi León ^{S T}	30	4	(Spain) Paloma Fernández ^{S}	27	5	(Spain) Bárbara Latorre ^{S}	30	13
(Spain) Mireia Nágel ^{T}	3	0	(Spain) Núria Mendoza	29	3	(Spain) Emma Marqués ^{S T}	25	0	(Spain) Debora García ^{T}	29	4
(Spain) Paula Canals ^{P}	1	0	(Spain) Cristina Becerra	28	0	(Portugal) Cláudia Neto ^{S T}	24	0	(Spain) Alba Pomares	24	2
			(Portugal) Sónia Matias ^{R}	27	2	(Spain) Sara Navarro ^{P T}	18	1	(United States) Haley Milligan ^{P}	13	0
			(Spain) Andrea Pereira	26	1	(Spain) Mayra Tarraga ^{P}	10	0	(Spain) Ari Forment ^{P}	7	0
			(Spain) Júlia Rebollo ^{S}	15	0	(Spain) Yaiza Pérez ^{P}	5	0	(Spain) Sonia Zarza ^{S T}	6	0
			(Spain) Carla Cotado	13	0	(Spain) Yasmina Chamarro ^{P}	1	0	(Spain) María Soriano ^{P ?}	5	0
									(Spain) Claudia Montagut ^{?}	3	1
									(Spain) Laura Casanovas ^{P}	1	0

2014–15 Primera División ^{(7th)}
Goalkeepers	Aps	Gls	Defenders	Aps	Gls	Midfielders	Aps	Gls	Forwards	Aps	Gls
(Spain) Irina Torrent ^{S ?}	20	0	(Spain) Inés Juan ^{S}	30	0	(Spain) Paloma Fernández	30	12	(Spain) Anair Lomba ^{S}	26	10
(Spain) Paula Canals ^{T}	12	0	(Spain) Andrea Pereira	29	5	(Spain) Ana Troyano ^{S}	27	2	(Spain) Bárbara Latorre ^{T}	25	6
			(Spain) Núria Mendoza ^{T}	29	1	(Spain) Yaiza Pérez ^{T}	21	0	(Spain) Alba Pomares	25	4
			(Spain) Estibi Torralbo ^{S}	27	0	(Italy) Martina Capelli ^{S T}	11	0	(Spain) Noelia Aybar ^{S T}	7	4
			(Spain) Carla Cotado	25	1	(Spain) Mayra Tárraga ^{T}	5	1	(Spain) Laura Casanovas ^{?}	4	0
			(Spain) María Estella ^{S T}	25	1	(Spain) Sandra Vilanova ^{S R}	5	0	(Spain) Ari Forment ^{T}	1	0
			(Mexico) Kenti Robles ^{S T}	24	1	(Spain) Sara Nassim ^{P ?}	4	0	(Spain) Andrea Granados ^{P T}	1	0
			(Spain) Júlia Rebollo	7	0	(Spain) Yasmina Chamarro ^{T}	2	1	(United States) Halley Milligan ^{?}	1	0
						(Spain) Paula Bolta ^{P T}	1	0			

2015–16 Primera División ^{(9th)}
Goalkeepers	Aps	Gls	Defenders	Aps	Gls	Midfielders	Aps	Gls	Forwards	Aps	Gls
(Spain) Norma Méndez ^{S}	20	0	(Spain) Elba Vergès ^{S}	29	5	(Spain) Paloma Fernández	30	6	(Spain) Laura Rocamora ^{S T}	25	1
(Spain) Andrea Giménez ^{P T}	10	0	(Spain) Inés Juan	26	1	(Spain) Aina Torres ^{S T}	29	1	(Spain) Anair Lomba	24	7
			(Spain) Andrea Pereira	26	0	(Spain) Aroa León ^{S T}	23	2	(Spain) Xiki Plà ^{S T}	21	1
			(Spain) Estibi Torralbo	25	0	(Spain) Zaira Flores ^{S}	19	0	(Spain) Anna Molet ^{S T}	16	1
			(Spain) Carla Cotado ^{T}	15	0	(Spain) Ana Troyano ^{R}	16	1	(Spain) Gloria Pelegrí ^{S T}	13	0
			(Spain) Júlia Rebollo ^{T}	10	0	(Spain) Mònica Bàcter ^{P T}	12	0	(Spain) Alba Pomares	5	1
			(Spain) María Molina ^{P}	9	0	(Spain) Vanessa Obis ^{S}	11	0	(Spain) Clàudia Dagà ^{P T}	5	0
			(Spain) Mireia Gironés ^{P T}	1	0	(Spain) Sara Ismael ^{P T}	7	0			
						(Spain) Leti Sevilla ^{S}	1	0			

2016–17 Primera División ^{(13th)}
Goalkeepers	Aps	Gls	Defenders	Aps	Gls	Midfielders	Aps	Gls	Forwards	Aps	Gls
(Spain) Mimi de Francisco ^{S}	22	0	(Spain) Elba Vergés ^{T}	30	1	(Spain) Paloma Fernández	29	4	(Spain) Cristina Baudet ^{S}	30	2
(Spain) Meru Méndez ^{T}	8	0	(Spain) Estibi Torralbo	27	0	(Spain) Brenda Pérez ^{S}	29	1	(Spain) Eli del Estal ^{S}	26	7
			(Spain) Núria Garrote ^{S}	26	2	(Spain) Carola García ^{S}	26	0	(Spain) Alba Pomares ^{T}	16	1
			(Spain) Inés Juan	16	1	(Spain) Leti Sevilla	18	1	(Spain) Anair Lomba ^{T}	14	3
			(Spain) Helena Serrano ^{S T}	13	0	(Spain) Zaira Flores ^{T}	17	0	(Brazil) Luana Roque ^{S}	12	4
			(Spain) María Molina ^{P}	11	0	(Spain) Pilar Garrote ^{S}	16	3	(Spain) Sara del Estal ^{S T}	12	0
			(Spain) Mar Mazuecos ^{S T}	3	0	(Paraguay) Dulce Quintana ^{S}	11	0	(Spain) Gemma Sala ^{S T}	9	0
						(Spain) Vane Obis ^{T}	3	0			

== Results by season ==
=== 2013–14 ===
==== Pre-season ====
17 August 2013 Friendly	RCD Espanyol	7–0	UE L'Estartit	(Catalonia) Sant Adrià de Besòs
	Latorre 29', 82'; Fernández 51', 69'; Navarro 75'; Pomares 87'; Pereira 89' (pen.)	Report

30 August 2013 C. Catalunya – SF	RCD Espanyol	9–0	EC Les Garrigues	(Catalonia) Sant Boi de Llobregat
	Fernández 10'; Zarza 23', 27'; Latorre 37', 61'; Montagut 53', 77'; Mendoza 83', 90'	Report

1 September 2013 C. Catalunya – F	RCD Espanyol	1–1 (4–3 p)	FC Barcelona	(Catalonia) Sant Boi de Llobregat
	Mendoza 76'	Report	Bermúdez 14'
	Penalties
	Navarro (penalty scored); Pereira (penalty scored); Latorre (penalty scored); Fernández (penalty missed); Marreiros (penalty missed); Rebollo (penalty scored)		(penalty missed) Losada; (penalty scored) Romero; (penalty scored) Gómez; (penalty missed) Gili; (penalty scored) Putellas; (penalty missed) Robles

==== Primera División ====
8 September 2013 1	Levante Las Planas	2–2	RCD Espanyol	(Catalonia) Sant Joan Despí
	Flores 41'; Carriba 53'	Report	Latorre 19'; León 75'

14 September 2013 2	RCD Espanyol	0–2	Levante UD	(Catalonia) Sant Adrià de Besòs
		Report	Gutiérrez 15'; García 52'

22 September 2013 3	Athletic Bilbao	3–0	RCD Espanyol	(Basque Country (autonomous community)) Lezama
	Vázquez 36', 66'; Arraiza 48'	Report

29 September 2013 4	RCD Espanyol	0–3	FC Barcelona	(Catalonia) Sant Adrià de Besòs
		Report	Corredera 3'; García 46'; Bermúdez 74'

6 October 2013 5	Atlético Madrid	1–0	RCD Espanyol	(Community of Madrid) Majadahonda
	Sampedro 10'	Report

13 October 2013 6	RCD Espanyol	2–0	CE Sant Gabriel	(Catalonia) Sant Adrià de Besòs
	Mendoza 7'; Latorre 90+2'	Report

20 October 2013 7	Sporting Huelva	2–2	RCD Espanyol	(Andalusia) San Juan del Puerto
	Martín-Prieto 13'; Sosa 85'	Report	Latorre 65'; Navarro 75'

3 November 2013 8	RCD Espanyol	2–0	Sevilla FC	(Catalonia) Sant Adrià de Besòs
	Fernández 39'; León 58'	Report

10 November 2013 9	UD Collerense	2–1	RCD Espanyol	(Balearic Islands) Palma de Mallorca
	Caldentey 42', 70'	Report	León 90'

17 November 2013 10	RCD Espanyol	2–1	Real Sociedad	(Catalonia) Sant Adrià de Besòs
	García 37'; Latorre 79'	Report	Bergara 72'

1 December 2013 11	Granada CF	2–2	RCD Espanyol	(Andalusia) Granada
	Urrea 51'; Requena 74'	Report	Latorre 11', 61'

7 December 2013 12	RCD Espanyol	0–1	Valencia CF	(Catalonia) Sant Adrià de Besòs
		Report	Monforte 52'

15 December 2013 13	RCD Espanyol	1–1	Rayo Vallecano	(Catalonia) Sant Adrià de Besòs
	Latorre 2'	Report	P. García 18'

29 December 2013 14	Oviedo Moderno	2–1	RCD Espanyol	(Asturias) Oviedo
	Madruga 36'; García 76'	Report	García 55'

4 January 2014 15	RCD Espanyol	0–1	CD Transportes Alcaine	(Catalonia) Sant Adrià de Besòs
		Report	Velásquez 68'

12 January 2014 16	RCD Espanyol	1–0	Levante Las Planas	(Catalonia) Sant Adrià de Besòs
	Mendoza 80'	Report

18 January 2014 17	Levante UD	1–0	RCD Espanyol	(Valencian Community) Valencia
		Report	Marqués 11' (o.g.)

26 January 2014 18	RCD Espanyol	1–2	Athletic Bilbao	(Catalonia) Sant Adrià de Besòs
	Latorre 40'	Report	Vázquez 23'; Lareo 47'

1 February 2014 19	FC Barcelona	4–0	RCD Espanyol	(Catalonia) Sant Joan Despí
	Putellas 2'; Bermúdez 36', 55'; Hermoso 52'	Report

9 February 2014 20	RCD Espanyol	2–1	Atlético Madrid	(Catalonia) Sant Adrià de Besòs
	Fernández 46'; Mendoza 73'	Report	González 47'

16 February 2014 21	CE Sant Gabriel	3–2	RCD Espanyol	(Catalonia) Sant Adrià de Besòs
	Villagrasa 61'; Díaz 78'; Hernández 79'	Report	Fernández 31'; García 64'

2 March 2014 22	RCD Espanyol	3–1	Sporting Huelva	(Catalonia) Sant Adrià de Besòs
	Latorre 18', 70'; Fernández 48'	Report	Sosa 73'

9 March 2014 23	Sevilla FC	0–1	RCD Espanyol	(Andalusia) Seville
		Report	Latorre 25'

16 March 2014 24	RCD Espanyol	1–3	UD Collerense	(Catalonia) Sant Adrià de Besòs
	Matias 16'	Report	López 8'; Espadas 58', 87'

23 March 2014 25	Real Sociedad	3–0	RCD Espanyol	(Basque Country (autonomous community)) Usurbil
	Peña 22', 32'; Encinas 89'	Report

30 March 2014 26	RCD Espanyol	2–2	Granada CF	(Catalonia) Sant Adrià de Besòs
	Pomares 28'; Montagut 75'	Report	Requena 73'; Martínez 90+2'

13 April 2014 27	Valencia CF	2–2	RCD Espanyol	(Valencian Community) Paterna
	Carreras 20'; Beristain 62'	Report	Latorre 83'; García 88'

18 April 2014 28	Rayo Vallecano	2–3	RCD Espanyol	(Community of Madrid) Madrid
	Mascaró 8'; López 25'	Report	Pomares 61'; Matias 63'; Costa 68'

27 April 2014 29	RCD Espanyol	3–3	Oviedo Moderno	(Asturias) Oviedo
	Latorre 27'; Fernández 68'; León 86'	Report	Gordillo 50'; Chamorro 58'; Corte 63'

4 May 2014 30	CD Transportes Alcaine	1–1	RCD Espanyol	(Aragon) Zaragoza
	Aznar 17'	Report	Pereira 90'

Pos	Team	Pld	W	D	L	GF	GA	GD	Pts
9	Sant Gabriel	30	9	7	14	40	56	−16	34
10	Collerense	30	10	4	16	45	62	−17	34
11	Espanyol	30	8	8	14	37	51	−14	32
12	Transportes Alcaine	30	8	7	15	29	55	−26	31
13	Oviedo Moderno	30	6	12	12	30	41	−11	30

Source: soccerway.com
Rules for classification: 1) points; 2) head-to-head points; 3) goal difference; 4) number of goals scored

=== 2014–15 ===
==== Primera División ====
7 September 2014 1	RCD Espanyol	0–5	Valencia CF	(Catalonia) Sant Adrià de Besòs
		Report	Beristain 20'; Monforte 37'; Férez 45', 50'; Vilas 76'

21 September 2014 2	CE Sant Gabriel	2–4	RCD Espanyol	(Catalonia) Sant Adrià de Besòs
	Gómez 17'; Sevilla 68'	Report	Robles 7'; Aybar 11'; Fernández 70'; Tárraga 90'

28 September 2014 3	RCD Espanyol	4–2	Sporting Huelva	(Catalonia) Sant Adrià de Besòs
	Fernández 4', 45'; Troyano 70', 80'	Report	Martín-Prieto 47'; V. García 75'

5 October 2014 4	Rayo Vallecano	0–0	RCD Espanyol	(Community of Madrid) Madrid
		Report

12 October 2014 5	RCD Espanyol	2–2	Real Sociedad	(Catalonia) Sant Adrià de Besòs
	Pomares 51'; Aybar 55'	Report	García 3'; Zelaia 76'

18 October 2014 6	Sevilla FC	2–2	RCD Espanyol	(Andalusia) Sevilla
	Delgado 5'; Jiménez 11'	Report	Latorre 82', 90+3'

26 October 2014 13	RCD Espanyol	1–1	Athletic Bilbao	(Catalonia) Sant Adrià de Besòs
	Lomba 47'	Report	Leoz 12'

2 November 2014 7	RCD Espanyol	2–2	Transportes Alcaine	(Catalonia) Sant Adrià de Besòs
	Fernández 23'; Aybar 55'	Report	Bernal 72'; Mallada 90+4'

9 November 2014 8	UD Collerense	1–2	RCD Espanyol	(Balearic Islands) Palma de Mallorca
	Gutiérrez 37'	Report	Aybar 9'; Cotado 87'

16 November 2014 9	RCD Espanyol	4–0	Santa Teresa CD	(Catalonia) Sant Adrià de Besòs
	Latorre 14'; Fernández 70'; Lomba 83'; Mendoza 84'	Report

22 November 2014 14	Oviedo Moderno	1–1	RCD Espanyol	(Asturias) Oviedo
	Juan 8' (o.g.)	Report	Latorre 6'

30 November 2014 10	Albacete Balompié	2–1	RCD Espanyol	(Castilla–La Mancha) Albacete
	Arranz 7'; Redondo 44'	Report	Latorre 45'

7 December 2014 11	RCD Espanyol	1–0	Levante UD	(Catalonia) Sant Adrià de Besòs
	Lomba 82'	Report

14 December 2014 12	Atlético Madrid	1–0	RCD Espanyol	(Community of Madrid) Majadahonda
	Sampedro 12'	Report

10 January 2015 15	RCD Espanyol	0–4	FC Barcelona	(Catalonia) Sant Adrià de Besòs
		Report	Bermúdez 9', 15'; Romero 12'; Unzué 61'

18 January 2015 16	Valencia CF	3–1	RCD Espanyol	(Valencian Community) Paterna
	Navalón 26'; Vilas 31'; Nicart 88'	Report	Pereira 83'

25 January 2015 17	RCD Espanyol	2–0	CE Sant Gabriel	(Catalonia) Sant Adrià de Besòs
	Pomares 7'; Lomba 90'	Report

1 February 2015 18	Sporting Huelva	3–2	RCD Espanyol	(Andalusia) Huelva
	Borini 36'; Gavira 67' (pen.); S. García 90'	Report	Latorre 2'; Lomba 54'

15 February 2015 19	RCD Espanyol	2–0	Rayo Vallecano	(Catalonia) Sant Adrià de Besòs
	Pomares 40'; Lomba 60'	Report

22 February 2015 20	Real Sociedad	3–0	RCD Espanyol	(Basque Country (autonomous community)) Usurbil
	García 46'; Moraza 64'; Peña 86'	Report

1 March 2015 21	RCD Espanyol	2–1	Sevilla FC	(Catalonia) Sant Adrià de Besòs
	Pomares 14'; Fernández 64'	Report	Fuentes 2'

8 March 2015 22	Transportes Alcaine	1–2	RCD Espanyol	(Aragon) Zaragoza
	Bernal 17'	Report	Pereira 23' (pen.); Mata 90' (o.g.)

15 March 2015 23	RCD Espanyol	5–2	UD Collerense	(Catalonia) Sant Adrià de Besòs
	Lomba 1', 67'; Fernández 58', 69'; Estella 88'	Report	Espadas 28'; López 73'

22 March 2015 24	Santa Teresa CD	1–1	RCD Espanyol	(Extremadura) Badajoz
	Lima 46'	Report	Lomba 45'

29 March 2015 25	RCD Espanyol	2–1	Albacete Balompié	(Catalonia) Sant Adrià de Besòs
	Pereira 44' (pen.), 56' (pen.)	Report	Martín 9'

5 April 2015 26	Levante UD	3–2	RCD Espanyol	(Valencian Community) Valencia
	García 36', 69'; Paños 87'	Report	Lomba 5'; Pereira 31' (pen.)

12 April 2015 27	RCD Espanyol	0–1	Atlético Madrid	(Catalonia) Sant Adrià de Besòs
		Report	González 2'

19 April 2015 28	Athletic Bilbao	7–1	RCD Espanyol	(Basque Country (autonomous community)) Lezama
	Díez 2', 8', 37', 76'; Vázquez 4', 42', 78'	Report	Fernández 16'

26 April 2015 29	RCD Espanyol	4–0	Oviedo Moderno	(Catalonia) Sant Adrià de Besòs
	Fernández 32', 45', 78'; Chamarro 84'	Report

2 May 2015 30	FC Barcelona	3–0	RCD Espanyol	(Catalonia) Sant Joan Despí
	Putellas 5'; Bermúdez 25'; Caldentey 45'	Report

Pos	Team	Pld	W	D	L	GF	GA	GD	Pts	Qualification or relegation
5	Levante	30	15	10	5	60	25	+35	55	Qualification for Copa de la Reina
6	Rayo Vallecano	30	13	8	9	45	34	+11	47	Qualification for Copa de la Reina
7	Espanyol	30	12	7	11	50	54	−4	43	Qualification for Copa de la Reina
8	Sporting Huelva	30	11	8	11	51	55	−4	41	Qualification for Copa de la Reina
9	Santa Teresa	30	9	7	14	33	53	−20	34	

Source: soccerway.com
Rules for classification: 1) points; 2) head-to-head points; 3) goal difference; 4) number of goals scored

==== Copa de la Reina ====
10 May 2015 QF	Atlético Madrid	5–1	RCD Espanyol	(Community of Madrid) Las Rozas de Madrid
	Sampedro 28'; González 31', 38'; Betlrán 58'; Rodríguez 80'	Report	Mendoza 3'

=== 2015–16 ===
==== Preseason ====
9 August 2015 Friendly	RCD Espanyol	3–0	Dickinson Red Devils	(Catalonia) Sant Adrià del Besòs
	Lomba 24'; Chamarro; Fernández	Report

16 August 2015 COTIF – 1	RCD Espanyol	1–0	Venezuela (national team)	(Valencian Community) L'Alcúdia
	Lomba 32'	Report

17 August 2015 COTIF – 2	Valencia CF	0–0	RCD Espanyol	(Valencian Community) L'Alcúdia
		Report

18 August 2015 COTIF – SF	Athletic Bilbao	2–0	RCD Espanyol	(Valencian Community) L'Alcúdia
	Ibarra 1'; Flaviano 48'	Report

16 August 2015 COTIF – TP	RCD Espanyol	1–0	Namibia (national team)	(Valencian Community) L'Alcúdia
	Fernández	Report

22 August 2015 Friendly	RCD Espanyol	3–1	CFF Marítim	(Catalonia) Sant Adrià del Besòs
	Plà 22'; Fernández 50'; Chamarro 60'	Report	Piñero 57'

23 August 2015 Friendly	RCD Espanyol	2–0	CE Seagull	(Catalonia) Sant Adrià del Besòs
	Juan 32'; Pereira 90'	Report

28 August 2015 Catalonia Cup – SF	RCD Espanyol	2–0	Levante Las Planas	(Catalonia) Vilassar de Mar
	Mazuecos 48'; Fernández 59'	Report

30 August 2015 Catalonia Cup – F	FC Barcelona	2–0	RCD Espanyol	(Catalonia) Vilassar de Mar
	R. García 56'; Gili 81'	Report

==== Primera División ====
5 September 2015 1	Valencia CF	2–0	RCD Espanyol	(Valencian Community) Paterna
	Beristain 1'; Nicart 90'	Report

13 September 2015 2	RCD Espanyol	1–0	Santa Teresa CD	(Catalonia) Sant Adrià de Besòs
	Fernández 59'	Report

26 September 2015 3	Real Sociedad	2–0	RCD Espanyol	(Basque Country (autonomous community)) Usurbil
	García 70'; Zelaia 74'	Report

4 October 2015 4	RCD Espanyol	2–1	Oiartzun KE	(Catalonia) Sant Adrià de Besòs
	Fernández 3', 23'	Report	Altonaga 82'

11 October 2015 5	Atlético Madrid	3–0	RCD Espanyol	(Community of Madrid) Majadahonda
	Sosa 5'; Rodríguez 79'; Sampedro 90'	Report

18 October 2015 6	RCD Espanyol	4–0	Oviedo Moderno	(Catalonia) Sant Adrià de Besòs
	Vergès 8'; Lomba 21'; Rocamora 38'; León 57'	Report

31 October 2015 7	UD Granadilla	2–3	RCD Espanyol	(Canary Islands) El Médano
	A. González 2'; Doblado 79'	Report	Juan 11'; Lomba 42'; Fernández 85'

7 November 2015 8	RCD Espanyol	0–2	Levante UD	(Catalonia) Sant Adrià de Besòs
		Report	López 80'; Corral 85'

15 November 2015 9	Athletic Bilbao	5–0	RCD Espanyol	(Basque Country (autonomous community)) Lezama
	Gimbert 18' (pen.), 52' (pen.); Díez 35', 59'; Vázquez 46'	Report

21 November 2015 10	RCD Espanyol	0–0	FC Barcelona	(Catalonia) Sant Adrià de Besòs
		Report

6 December 2015 11	Transportes Alcaine	0–1	RCD Espanyol	(Aragon) Zaragoza
		Report	Plà 85'

13 December 2015 12	RCD Espanyol	2–1	Rayo Vallecano	(Catalonia) Sant Adrià de Besòs
	Lomba 65'; Troyano 73'	Report	Mascaró 52'

10 January 2016 13	Sporting Huelva	0–1	RCD Espanyol	(Andalusia) Huelva
		Report	Pavel 79' (o.g.)

17 January 2016 14	RCD Espanyol	2–1	Albacete Balompié	(Catalonia) Sant Adrià de Besòs
	Lomba 25'; Fernández 66'	Report	del Estal 68'

31 January 2016 15	UD Collerense	1–0	RCD Espanyol	(Balearic Islands) Palma de Mallorca
	Coll 24'	Report

7 February 2016 16	RCD Espanyol	0–4	Valencia CF	(Catalonia) Sant Adrià de Besòs
		Report	Férez 7', 71'; Vilas 70', 80'

21 February 2016 17	Santa Teresa CD	3–1	RCD Espanyol	(Extremadura) Badajoz
	Lima 68' (pen.); Arranz 70'; Ma. García 86'	Report	Fernández 80'

27 February 2016 18	RCD Espanyol	0–0	Real Sociedad	(Catalonia) Sant Adrià de Besòs
		Report

13 March 2016 19	Oiartzun KE	1–0	RCD Espanyol	(Basque Country (autonomous community)) Oiartzun
	Altonaga 84'	Report

19 March 2016 20	RCD Espanyol	1–2	Atlético Madrid	(Catalonia) Sant Adrià de Besòs
	León 22'	Report	Bermúdez 20'; Borja 85'

27 March 2016 21	Oviedo Moderno	2–2	RCD Espanyol	(Asturias) Oviedo
	García 12'; Arnaiz 51' (pen.)	Report	Vergès 77', 90'

3 April 2016 22	RCD Espanyol	0–0	UD Granadilla	(Catalonia) Sant Adrià de Besòs
		Report

16 April 2016 23	Levante UD	3–2	RCD Espanyol	(Valencian Community) Valencia
	Marín 2'; Rocafull 6'; Merino 31'	Report	Lomba 28'; Torres 90'

24 April 2016 24	RCD Espanyol	0–2	Athletic Bilbao	(Catalonia) Sant Adrià de Besòs
		Report	Gimbert 54'; Vázquez 57'

1 May 2016 25	FC Barcelona	7–1	RCD Espanyol	(Catalonia) Sant Joan Despí
	O. García 32', 35'; Hermoso 39' (pen.), 58', 64'; Hernández 67'; Putellas 73'	Report	Vergès 69'

15 May 2016 26	RCD Espanyol	2–3	Transportes Alcaine	(Catalonia) Sant Adrià de Besòs
	Lomba 11'; Pomares 61'	Report	Cebolla 2'; Juan 51' (o.g.); Bernal 87'

22 May 2016 27	Rayo Vallecano	1–1	RCD Espanyol	(Community of Madrid) Madrid
	López 34'	Report	Molet 85'

29 May 2016 28	RCD Espanyol	1–0	Sporting Huelva	(Catalonia) Sant Adrià de Besòs
	Lomba 46'	Report

5 June 2016 29	Albacete Balompié	0–1	RCD Espanyol	(Castilla–La Mancha) Albacete
		Report	Vergès 85'

12 June 2016 30	RCD Espanyol	0–0	UD Collerense	(Catalonia) Sant Adrià de Besòs
		Report

Pos	Team	Pld	W	D	L	GF	GA	GD	Pts	Qualification or relegation
7	Granadilla	30	14	5	11	49	44	+5	47	Qualification for Copa de la Reina
8	Sporting Huelva	30	13	7	10	44	39	+5	46	Qualification for Copa de la Reina
9	Espanyol	30	10	6	14	28	48	−20	36	
10	Rayo Vallecano	30	10	6	14	34	48	−14	36	
11	Santa Teresa	30	9	5	16	43	62	−19	32	

Source: soccerway.com
Rules for classification: 1) points; 2) head-to-head points; 3) goal difference; 4) number of goals scored

=== 2016–17 ===
==== Pre-season ====
1 August 2016 COTIF – 1	RCD Espanyol	2–0	CF Benfica	(Valencian Community) L'Alcúdia
	Lomba 14'; Baudet 70'	Report

2 August 2016 COTIF – 2	RCD Espanyol	1–3	Kenya (national team)	(Valencian Community) L'Alcúdia
	Flores 29'	Report	Akida 22', 49'; Nedy 40'

3 August 2016 COTIF – SF	RCD Espanyol	0–0 (2–3 p)	Venezuela (national team)	(Valencian Community) L'Alcúdia
		Report
	Penalties
	Torralbo (penalty scored); Flores (penalty scored); Lomba (penalty missed); Juan (penalty missed)		(penalty missed) García; (penalty scored) Romero; (penalty scored) Pérez; (penalty scored) Mariana

4 August 2016 COTIF – 3P	RCD Espanyol	2–0	Kenya (national team)	(Valencian Community) L'Alcúdia
	Lomba 20'; Pomares 76'	Report

8 August 2016 Friendly	RCD Espanyol	5–0	CDA Slammers	(Catalonia) Sant Adrià del Besòs
	P. Garrote; Lomba; Fernández	Report

13 August 2016 Friendly	RCD Espanyol	5–0	Anderson Ravens	(Catalonia) Sant Adrià del Besòs
	Lomba; Mazuecos; P. Garrote; Baudet	Report

20 August 2016 Friendly	RCD Espanyol	0–1	Valencia CF	(Catalonia) Sant Adrià del Besòs
		Report	Vilas 50'

21 August 2016 Friendly	Levante Las Planas	0–8	RCD Espanyol	(Catalonia) Sant Joan Despí
		Report	Baudet; Mazuecos; Lomba; Fernández ? (o.g.); Pomares

26 August 2016 Catalonia Cup – SF	RCD Espanyol	0–0	CE Seagull (4–2 p)	(Catalonia) Mollet del Vallés
		Report
	Penalties
	E. del Estal (penalty scored); Juan (penalty scored); Baudet (penalty scored); Flores (penalty scored)		(penalty scored) Gordo; (penalty scored) Serna; (penalty missed) Miranda; (penalty missed) Royo

28 August 2016 Catalonia Cup – F	FC Barcelona	6–0	RCD Espanyol	(Catalonia) Mollet del Vallés
	Hermoso 13'; Torrejón 55'; Putellas 64'; Bonmatí 68'; O. García 64' (pen.); Caldentey 86'	Report

==== Primera División ====
4 September 2016 1	Oiartzun KE	0–0	RCD Espanyol	(Basque Country (autonomous community)) Oiartzun
		Report

11 September 2016 2	RCD Espanyol	0–2	Valencia CF	(Catalonia) Sant Adrià del Besòs
		Report	Vilas 39' (pen.); Szymanowski 46'

25 September 2016 3	Atlético Madrid	6–0	RCD Espanyol	(Community of Madrid) Majadahonda
	Juan 45' (o.g.); González 46', 81'; Bermúdez 77', 85', 87'	Report

1 October 2016 4	RCD Espanyol	1–3	Levante UD	(Catalonia) Sant Adrià del Besòs
	Lomba 59'	Report	Corral 32'; Marín 44'; Pérez 46'

8 October 2016 5	UD Granadilla	2–1	RCD Espanyol	(Canary Islands) El Médano
	S. González 23'; Spindler 87'	Report	Fernández 19'

16 October 2016 7	Real Sociedad	1–1	RCD Espanyol	(Basque Country (autonomous community)) Usurbil
	Lareo 18'	Report	Lomba 85'

29 October 2016 8	RCD Espanyol	0–3	Rayo Vallecano	(Catalonia) Sant Adrià del Besòs
		Report	Sánchez 3'; Vergés 9' (o.g.); Carreño 87'

2 November 2016 6	RCD Espanyol	1–6	FC Barcelona	(Catalonia) Sant Adrià del Besòs
	Pérez 34'	Report	Gili 16', 48'; Hermoso 18', 40', 52'; Latorre 66'

6 November 2016 9	Zaragoza CFF	2–1	RCD Espanyol	(Aragon) Zaragoza
	Aznar 43'; Gómez 61'	Report	Vergés 79'

13 November 2016 10	RCD Espanyol	2–0	Santa Teresa CD	(Catalonia) Sant Adrià del Besòs
	E. del Estal 79'; Lomba 87'	Report

20 November 2016 11	RCD Espanyol	3–3	Albacete Balompié	(Catalonia) Sant Adrià del Besòs
	P. Garrote 40'; Fernández 45'; Baudet 55'	Report	Samit 30', 37'; Bautista 82'

4 December 2016 12	Sporting Huelva	2–1	RCD Espanyol	(Andalusia) Huelva
	Martínez 44'; Hernández 46'	Report	Pomares 62'

8 December 2016 13	RCD Espanyol	2–0	UD Tacuense	(Catalonia) Sant Adrià del Besòs
	N. Garrote 61'; Juan 83'	Report

12 December 2016 14	Real Betis	2–1	RCD Espanyol	(Andalusia) Sevilla
	Rodríguez 73'; Relea 87'	Report	Fernández 29'

8 January 2017 15	RCD Espanyol	1–1	Athletic Bilbao	(Catalonia) Sant Adrià del Besòs
	Baudet 66'	Report	Corres 15'

15 January 2017 16	RCD Espanyol	0–2	Oiartzun KE	(Catalonia) Sant Adrià del Besòs
		Report	Arranz 75'; González 83'

28 January 2017 17	Valencia CF	0–0	RCD Espanyol	(Valencian Community) Paterna
		Report

11 February 2017 18	RCD Espanyol	1–2	Atlético Madrid	(Catalonia) Sant Adrià del Besòs
	Roque 85'	Report	González 21'; Borja 58'

19 February 2017 19	Levante UD	2–1	RCD Espanyol	(Valencian Community) Paiporta
	M. Pérez 10'; Martín 39'	Report	Roque 84'

26 February 2017 20	RCD Espanyol	1–1	UD Granadilla	(Catalonia) Sant Adrià del Besòs
	Roque 1'	Report	Doblado 58'

11 March 2017 21	FC Barcelona	5–0	RCD Espanyol	(Catalonia) Barcelona
	Alves 40'; Hermoso 44', 58'; Losada 52'; Latorre 68'	Report

19 March 2017 22	RCD Espanyol	1–3	Real Sociedad	(Catalonia) Sant Adrià del Besòs
	P. Garrote 13'	Report	Vergés 3' (o.g.); Lareo 15'; García 22'

26 March 2017 23	Rayo Vallecano	3–2	RCD Espanyol	(Community of Madrid) Madrid
	Pablos 11', 70'; Carreño 42'	Report	E. del Estal 8', 17'

2 April 2017 24	RCD Espanyol	0–2	Zaragoza CFF	(Catalonia) Sant Adrià del Besòs
		Report	García 38'; Mallada 49'

16 April 2017 25	Santa Teresa CD	3–0	RCD Espanyol	(Extremadura) Badajoz
	Torres 33'; Lima 41' (pen.); Barea 57'	Report

23 April 2017 26	Albacete Balompié	0–2	RCD Espanyol	(Castilla–La Mancha) Albacete
		Report	E. del Estal 27'; Fernández 62'

30 April 2017 27	RCD Espanyol	2–1	Sporting Huelva	(Catalonia) Sant Adrià del Besòs
	E. del Estal 82', 85'	Report	Hernández 35'

7 May 2017 28	UD Tacuense	0–0	RCD Espanyol	(Canary Islands) San Cristóbal de la Laguna
		Report

13 May 2017 29	RCD Espanyol	2–0	Real Betis	(Catalonia) Sant Adrià del Besòs
	Sevilla 28'; P. Garrote 60'	Report

21 May 2017 30	Athletic Bilbao	3–3	RCD Espanyol	(Basque Country (autonomous community)) Lezama
	Murua 56'; Vázquez 78', 83'	Report	Roque 31'; N. Garrote 49'; E. del Estal 90'

Pos	Team	Pld	W	D	L	GF	GA	GD	Pts	Qualification or relegation
11	Betis	30	10	4	16	36	51	−15	34	
12	Zaragoza CFF	30	8	8	14	31	65	−34	32	
13	Espanyol	30	5	8	17	30	60	−30	23	
14	Fundación Albacete	30	5	5	20	37	76	−39	20	
15	Oiartzun (R)	30	4	6	20	23	74	−51	18	Relegation to the Segunda División

Source: Futbolme
Rules for classification: 1) points; 2) head-to-head points; 3) goal difference; 4) number of goals scored
(R) Relegated

=== 2017–18 ===
==== Pre-season ====
9 August 2017 Friendly	SE AEM	1–1	RCD Espanyol	(Catalonia) Lleida
	Elvira 18'	Report	Baudet 44' (pen.)

12 August 2017 Friendly	RCD Espanyol	12–0	Clark Cougars
	Rinaldi-Salvatori; Llopis; Pérez del Estal; Baudet; Roque; Hannula	Report

16 August 2017 Friendly	RCD Espanyol	9–0	CF Pallejà
	del Estal; Salvatori-Rinaldi; Llopis; Juan; Baudet; Nicol; Čonč	Report

19 August 2017 Friendly	RCD Espanyol	5–0	CF Pardinyes
	del Estal; Baudet; Salvatori-Rinaldi; Nicol	Report

25 August 2017 Catalonia Cup – SF	RCD Espanyol	1–0	CE Seagull	(Catalonia) Gavà
	del Estal 88'	Report

27 August 2017 Catalonia Cup – SF	FC Barcelona	3–0	RCD Espanyol	(Catalonia) Gavà
	Quintana 34' (o.g.); Latorre 35'; Guijarro 90'	Report

==== Primera División ====
2 September 2017 1	RCD Espanyol	1–0	Real Betis	(Catalonia) Sant Adrià de Besòs
	Fernández 71'	Report

10 September 2017 2	Sevilla FC	1–3	RCD Espanyol	(Andalusia) Sevilla
	Morilla 8'	Report	Baudet 10' del Estal 49'; Pujadas 65'

24 September 2017 3	Sporting Huelva	2–0	RCD Espanyol	(Andalusia) Huelva
	Hernández 45'; Ngo 90'	Report

1 October 2017 4	RCD Espanyol	0–1	Rayo Vallecano	(Catalonia) Sant Adrià de Besòs
		Report	Pablos 38'

Pos	Team	Pld	W	D	L	GF	GA	GD	Pts	Qualification or relegation
12	Sevilla	30	8	7	15	35	50	−15	31	
13	Fundación Albacete	30	8	6	16	42	58	−16	30	
14	Espanyol	30	7	8	15	22	42	−20	29	
15	Zaragoza CFF (R)	30	6	5	19	31	67	−36	23	Relegation to the Segunda División
16	Santa Teresa (R)	30	4	7	19	20	68	−48	19	Relegation to the Segunda División

Source: La Liga, Soccerway
Rules for classification: 1) points; 2) head-to-head points; 3) goal difference; 4) number of goals scored
(R) Relegated
