= 2015–16 Primera División (women) =

Primera División
- Season: 2015–16
- Champions: Athletic Bilbao (5th title)
- Relegated: Collerense; Oviedo Moderno
- Champions League: Athletic Bilbao; Barcelona
- Matches: 240
- Goals: 783 (3.26 per match)
- Top goalscorer: Jennifer Hermoso (24 goals)
- Biggest home win: Atlético Madrid 9–1 Fundación Albacete; Valencia 8–0 Oiartzun; Barcelona 8–0 Oviedo Moderno
- Biggest away win: Fundación Albacete 0–10 Barcelona
- Highest scoring: Atlético Madrid 9–1 Fundación Albacete; Fundación Albacete 0–10 Barcelona
- Longest winning run: 12 games Athletic Bilbao
- Longest unbeaten run: 28 games Barcelona
- Longest losing run: 10 games Oviedo Moderno

The 2015–16 Primera División Femenina de Fútbol was the 28th edition of Spain's highest women's football league.

== Overview ==
Barcelona defended the title for the fourth straight season. The competition, running from 6 September 2015 to 12 June 2016, was contested by sixteen teams, with Granadilla making its debut.

Athletic Bilbao became champion on 5 June 2016 after taking advantage of the defeat of Barcelona against Atlético Madrid by 0–1. Previously, Athletic beat Oviedo Moderno, relegated like Collerense, 3–0 at Lezama.

== Teams ==
Location of the 2015–16 mainland Primera División teams
Location of the 2015–16 Primera División team from the Canary Islands

Team	Home city	Stadium	Head coach	Captain
Athletic Bilbao	Bilbao	Lezama	Joseba Agirre	Iraia Iturregi
Atlético Madrid	Madrid	Estadio Cerro del Espino	Ángel Villacampa	Amanda Sampedro
Barcelona	Barcelona	Ciutat Esportiva Joan Gamper	Xavier Llorens	Marta Unzué
Collerense	Palma de Mallorca	Estadi Municipal Coll d’en Rebassa	José Antonio Sánchez Ros	Pilar Espadas
Espanyol	Barcelona	Ciutat Esportiva Dani Jarque	Antonio Polidano	Paloma Fernández
Fundación Albacete	Albacete	Ciudad Deportiva Andrés Iniesta	Milagros Martínez	Matilde Martínez
Granadilla	Granadilla de Abona	Estadio Municipal Francisco Suárez	Toni Ayala	Cindy García
Levante	Valencia	El Terrer	Andrés Tudela	Mariví Simó
Oiartzun	Oiartzun	Karla Lekuona	Jon Alkorta	Anne Mugarza
Oviedo Moderno	Oviedo	Estadio Manuel Díaz Vega	Emilio Fernández Cañedo	Alba Gordillo
Rayo Vallecano	Madrid	Ciudad Deportiva Rayo Vallecano	Alberto Ruiz de la Hermosa	Alicia Gómez
Real Sociedad	San Sebastián	Zubieta	Igor San Miguel	Aintzane Encinas
Santa Teresa	Badajoz	Estadio El Vivero	Juan Carlos Antúnez	Estefanía Lima
Sporting Huelva	Huelva	Ciudad Deportiva El Conquero	Antonio Toledo	Patricia Gavira
Transportes Alcaine	Zaragoza	Estadio Pedro Sancho	Alberto Berna	Nuria Mallada
Valencia	Valencia	Ciudad Deportiva de Paterna	Cristian Toro	Ivana Andrés

== League table ==
Pos	Team	Pld	W	D	L	GF	GA	GD	Pts	Qualification or relegation
1	Athletic Bilbao (C)	30	25	3	2	75	15	+60	78	Qualification for UEFA Champions League and Copa de la Reina
2	Barcelona	30	24	5	1	98	12	+86	77	Qualification for UEFA Champions League and Copa de la Reina
3	Atlético Madrid	30	22	3	5	83	24	+59	69	Qualification for Copa de la Reina
4	Levante	30	16	6	8	56	38	+18	54	Qualification for Copa de la Reina
5	Real Sociedad	30	16	5	9	50	33	+17	53	Qualification for Copa de la Reina
6	Valencia	30	15	4	11	65	30	+35	49	Qualification for Copa de la Reina
7	Granadilla	30	14	5	11	49	44	+5	47	Qualification for Copa de la Reina
8	Sporting Huelva	30	13	7	10	44	39	+5	46	Qualification for Copa de la Reina
9	Espanyol	30	10	6	14	28	48	−20	36	
10	Rayo Vallecano	30	10	6	14	34	48	−14	36	
11	Santa Teresa	30	9	5	16	43	62	−19	32	
12	Transportes Alcaine	30	10	2	18	38	68	−30	32	
13	Fundación Albacete	30	6	7	17	47	93	−46	25	
14	Oiartzun	30	6	6	18	24	67	−43	24	
15	Oviedo Moderno (R)	30	2	5	23	21	78	−57	11	Relegation to Segunda División
16	Collerense (R)	30	1	7	22	28	84	−56	10	Relegation to Segunda División

Source: soccerway.com
Rules for classification: 1) points; 2) head-to-head points; 3) goal difference; 4) number of goals scored
(C) Champions; (R) Relegated

== Results ==
Home \ Away	ATH	ATM	FCB	COL	ESP	FUN	GRA	LEV	OKE	OVI	RAY	RSS	STE	SPH	TAZ	VAL
Athletic Bilbao		3–0	1–1	5–0	5–0	5–1	5–1	0–0	2–0	3–0	1–0	5–0	3–1	3–0	3–0	3–2
Atlético Madrid	1–2		0–0	5–0	3–0	9–1	5–0	1–2	3–0	5–1	3–0	2–1	4–2	3–1	7–2	0–3
Barcelona	1–1	0–1		2–1	7–1	2–0	3–0	7–1	2–0	8–0	4–0	1–0	5–1	1–1	6–0	2–0
Collerense	0–3	0–5	0–3		1–0	4–4	1–2	1–2	2–2	2–2	1–3	0–2	2–2	0–4	2–2	0–7
Espanyol	0–2	1–2	0–0	0–0		2–1	0–0	0–2	2–1	4–0	2–1	0–0	1–0	1–0	2–3	0–4
Fundación Albacete	1–3	1–3	0–10	3–2	0–1		2–0	1–6	4–3	3–2	2–3	0–6	4–4	2–2	3–1	2–6
Granadilla	2–1	0–1	1–3	3–2	2–3	1–0		0–0	4–0	4–0	3–0	3–0	4–1	1–1	4–0	1–0
Levante	0–2	1–1	0–1	4–0	3–2	1–1	6–1		1–1	3–1	2–1	2–1	4–0	4–0	2–3	0–0
Oiartzun	0–4	0–5	0–5	2–1	1–0	1–0	2–0	0–1		1–0	0–2	0–1	3–2	2–2	1–2	0–2
Oviedo Moderno	0–2	0–1	0–5	0–0	2–2	0–3	1–4	0–3	3–1		1–2	1–2	0–1	0–4	1–3	2–2
Rayo Vallecano	2–0	0–2	1–2	2–1	1–1	2–2	1–1	2–0	1–1	0–1		2–2	2–1	0–1	2–1	1–1
Real Sociedad	1–2	1–0	0–3	3–1	2–0	2–2	1–1	4–0	3–0	3–0	3–0		1–0	0–1	4–2	0–1
Santa Teresa	0–1	0–1	0–7	3–1	3–1	1–0	1–4	1–3	1–1	1–1	3–0	1–3		3–2	2–0	2–0
Sporting Huelva	0–2	1–1	1–2	2–1	0–1	2–2	0–2	2–1	3–0	3–2	3–1	0–0	1–0		3–1	1–0
Transportes Alcaine	0–1	1–6	0–3	4–1	0–1	3–0	1–0	1–2	1–1	1–0	2–0	1–2	1–4	4–1		0–2
Valencia	1–2	0–2	1–2	3–1	2–0	6–2	3–0	2–0	8–0	2–0	0–1	1–2	2–2	1–2	2–0	

Updated to match(es) played on unknown. Source: soccerway.com
Legend: Blue = home team win; Yellow = draw; Red = away team win.

== Season statistics ==
=== Top scorers ===
Rank	Player	Club	Goals
1	Jennifer Hermoso	Barcelona	24
2	Charlyn Corral	Levante	22
3	Sonia Bermúdez	Atlético Madrid	20
4	María Paz Vilas	Valencia	19
5	Esther González	Atlético Madrid	18
5	Estefanía Lima	Santa Teresa	18
5	Alexia Putellas	Barcelona	18
8	Nahikari García	Real Sociedad	15
9	Yulema Corres	Athletic Bilbao	14
10	María José Pérez	Granadilla	13

=== Best goalkeepers ===
Rank	Player	Club	Goals against	Minutes	Coeff.
1	Laura Ràfols	Barcelona	3	1080	1:360
2	Ainhoa Tirapu	Athletic Bilbao	15	2700	1:180
2	Sandra Paños	Barcelona	9	1620	1:180
4	Noelia Gil	Atlético Madrid	6	785	1:130.83
5	Esther Sullastres	Valencia	15	1693	1:112.87
6	Dolores Gallardo	Atlético Madrid	18	1905	1:105.83
7	Noelia Bermúdez	Levante	15	1317	1:87.8

=== Hat-tricks ===
Player	For	Against	Result	Round
Jennifer Hermoso	Barcelona	Levante	7–1 (h)	2
Sonia Bermúdez	Atlético Madrid	Fundación Albacete	9–1 (h)	3
Charlyn Corral	Levante	Sporting Huelva	4–0 (h)	5
María Paz Vilas^{4}	Valencia	Oiartzun	8–0 (h)	7
Alexia Putellas^{4}	Barcelona	Fundación Albacete	0–10 (a)	8
Nahikari García	Real Sociedad	Levante	4–0 (h)	10
María Paz Vilas	Valencia	Fundación Albacete	2–6 (a)	12
Elisa del Estal	Fundación Albacete	Collerense	3–2 (h)	13
Ainize Barea^{4}	Santa Teresa	Fundación Albacete	4–4 (a)	15
Alexia Putellas	Barcelona	Oviedo Moderno	8–0 (h)	15
María Díaz Cirauqui	Real Sociedad	Fundación Albacete	0–6 (a)	16
Jennifer Hermoso	Barcelona	Espanyol	6–1 (h)	25
María Arranz	Fundación Albacete	Collerense	4–4 (a)	28
Sheila Guijarro	Levante	Granadilla	6–1 (h)	29
María Paz Vilas	Valencia	Collerense	0–7 (a)	29
Sonia Bermúdez	Atlético Madrid	Transportes Alcaine	7–2 (h)	30

^{4} Player scored 4 goals

== All-season Team ==

All-season team

On 27 June 2016, La Liga named for the first time an All-season Team.

Pos	Name	Team
GK	Noelia Bermúdez	Levante
DF	Irene Paredes	Athletic Bilbao
DF	Cindy García	Granadilla
DF	Marta Torrejón	Barcelona
DF	Mapi	Atlético Madrid
MF	Estefanía Lima	Santa Teresa
MF	Alexia Putellas	Barcelona
MF	María José Pérez	Granadilla
FW	Charlyn Corral	Levante
FW	Paloma Lázaro	Granadilla
FW	Yulema Corres	Athletic Bilbao

== Transfers ==
Team	In	Out
Athletic Bilbao	Joseba Aguirre (Club Portugalete) HC; Ainhoa Vicente (Real Sociedad) DF; Joana Flaviano (ASD Torres Calcio) MF	Juan Luis Fuentes (Lezama Facilities) HC; Ane Otxoa de Zuazola (Oviedo Moderno) GK; Joana Arranz (CD Santa Teresa) DF; Arene Altonaga (Oiartzun KE) MF; Jone Bilbao (Oiartzun KE) MF; Izaskun Leoz (Real Sociedad) MF; Arrate Orueta (retired) MF
Atlético de Madrid	Kenti Robles (RCD Espanyol) DF; Ainoa Campo (CD Parquesol) MF; Mariela Coronel (Transportes Alcaine) MF; Sonia Bermúdez (FC Barcelona) FW; Laura Fernández (CD Parquesol) FW	Brenda Pérez (CD Canillas) MF
FC Barcelona	Sandra Paños (Levante UD) GK; Ane Bergara (Real Sociedad) DF; Irene del Río (Oviedo Moderno) MF; Patricia Guijarro (UD Collerense) MF; Olga García (Levante UD) FW; Bárbara Latorre (RCD Espanyol) FW; Andreia Norton (Clube de Albergaria) FW	Chelsea Ashurst (Atlético Málaga) GK; Marta Corredera (Arsenal LFC) MF; Virginia Torrecilla (Montpellier HSC) MF; Sonia Bermúdez (Atlético Madrid) FW; Ana Romero "Willy" (Valencia CF) FW
UD Collerense	Yanira Ortigosa (Pollença i Port CF) GK; María José Busquets (CE Algaida) MF; Noelia Muñoz (Sporting Ciutat de Palma) MF; Elizabeth Sánchez (??) MF	Anita Campos (??) DF; Isabel Calero (??) MF; Patricia Guijarro (FC Barcelona) MF; Maitane López (Levante UD) FW
RCD Espanyol	Antonio Polidano (FC Levante Las Planas) HC; Norma Méndez (CE Sant Gabriel) GK; Elba Vergés (FC Levante Las Planas) DF; Zaira Flores (FC Levante Las Planas) MF; Aroa León (CE Sant Gabriel) MF; Vanessa Obis (CE Europa) MF; Laura Rocamora (CE Sant Gabriel) MF; Leticia Sevilla (CE Sant Gabriel) MF; María Siegrist (Saint Leo University) MF; Laura Benito (CE Sant Gabriel) FW; Anna Molet (CE Llerona) FW; Glòria Pelegrí (CE Sant Gabriel) FW; Gemma Plà (CE Sant Gabriel) FW	José Antonio Montes (CD Montcada) HC; Paula Canals (Levante UD) GK; Irina Torrent (??) GK; María Estella del Valle (UD Granadilla Tenerife Sur) DF; Kenti Robles (Atlético de Madrid) DF; Núria Mendoza (Real Sociedad) MF; Bárbara Latorre (FC Barcelona) FW; Noelia Aybar "Rivi" (Sporting de Huelva) FW
Fundación Albacete	Celia Andrés (Dínamo Guadalajara) DF; Yolanda Palomino (Villarreal CF) DF; Autumm Wheleer (Elche CF) DF; Helena Torres (Sporting Plaza de Argel) MF; Aida Samit (Villarreal CF) FW	Esther Cañete (??) DF; Estefanía Aroca (??) DF; Gloria García (??) DF; Marina Sáez (??) MF; Marina Martí (Sporting de Huelva) FW; Alicia Muñoz (Sporting de Huelva) FW
UD Granadilla Tenerife Sur	Mónica González (CD Echedey) DF; María Estella del Valle (RCD Espanyol) DF; Wendy Acosta (UD Moravia) MF; Sara "Tui" (FVPR El Olivo) MF; Paloma Lázaro (Madrid CFF) FW; Laura Ortega (Charleston Cougars) FW	Julia Amador (Missouri Valley Vikings) DF; Deni Rae Stewart (Arsenal Ladies u-17) DF; Laura Castro (retired/director of communications) MF; Tamara Martín (UD Tacuense) MF; Raquel Gil (UD Tacuense) FW
Levante UD	Andrés Tudela (Levante UD "B") HC; Paula Canals (RCD Espanyol) GK; Lourdes Vilches (Levante UD "B") GK; Olivia Oprea (Sevilla FC) DF; Maitane López (UD Collerense) MF; Charlyn Corral (Merilappi United) FW; Lucía Gómez (Levante UD "B") FW	Antonio Contreras (??) HC; Paula Canals (Luleå FF) GK; Sandra Paños (FC Barcelona) GK; Maider Castillo (retired/Levante UD "B") DF/HC; Lidiya Nacheva (FC NSA Sofia) MF; Olga García (FC Barcelona) FW
Oiartzun KE	Oihana Aldai (Añorga KKE) GK; Marina Agoues (Real Sociedad) MF; Arene Altonaga (Athletic Club) MF; Ainara Herrero (unattached) MF; Nerea Murua (Tolosa CF) MF; Sara Olaizola (CD Mariño) MF; Jone Bilbao (Athletic Club) FW; Carolina González (FVPR El Olivo) FW; Ana Mar Luzuriaga (Tolosa CF) FW	Eider Herrero (retired) GK; Ane Etxezarreta (Real Sociedad) MF; Nahia Mendiable (??) MF
Oviedo Moderno	Ane Otxoa de Zuazola (Athletic Club) GK; Laura Gutiérrez (Marino de Luanco) MF; Henar Muiña (Gijón FF) MF; Irene Santos (Gijón FF) MF	"Maru" Rodríguez (retired) GK; María Sánchez-Migallón (Orzán SD) DF; Irene del Río (FC Barcelona) MF; Silvia Fernández (retired) MF
Rayo Vallecano	Alberto Ruiz (Rayo Vallecano "B") HC; Ana Vallés (Oviedo Moderno "B") GK; Estela Fernández (Madrid CFF) MF; Jennifer Santiago (CD Canillas) MF; Ana Lucía Martínez (Dínamo Guadalajara) FW; Nicole Regnier (Atlético Madrid "B") FW	Laura Torvisco (Rayo's youth system coordinator); Natalia Yagüe (CD Canillas) GK; Patricia Gudiel (EFF Alcobendas) DF; Sara Sánchez "Chufi" (CD Canillas) MF; Jade Boho (Bristol Academy WFC) FW; Marika Ohshima (Madrid CFF) FW
Real Sociedad	Igor San Miguel (Mudarra KE) HC; Iraia Iparragirre (Añorga KKE) DF; Núria Mendoza (RCD Espanyol) DF; Paola Soldevilla (CE Sant Gabriel) DF; Titay Calvo (Oiartzun KE) MF; Ane Etxezarreta (Oiartzun KE) MF; Izaskun Leoz (Athletic Club) MF; Manuela Lareo (Valencia CF) FW	Unai Gazpio (Real Sociedad under-17) HC; Ane Bergara (FC Barcelona) DF; Nerea Gabirondo (??) DF; Ainhoa Vicente (Athletic Club) DF; Marina Agoues (Oiartzun KE) MF; Uxue Garmendia (CD Mariño) MF; Idoia Agirre (Anderson University, SC) FW
Santa Teresa CD	Joana Arranz (Athletic Club) DF; Lixy Rodríguez (LD Alajuelense) DF; Carola García (CE Sant Gabriel) MF; María Rosa Martínez (Juventud UVA) MF; Ainize Barea (CD Ugao) FW; Amanda Bodión (CFF Badajoz & Olivenza) FW; Natalia Francisco (Sárdoma CF) FW	Saray Gómez (CCF Cáceres) DF; Pilar Moreno (Torrelodones CF) DF; Sara Del Estal (EDF Logoroño) MF; Patricia Traver (Villarreal CF) MF; Soledad Rodríguez (??) FW
Sporting de Huelva	Marta Gayà (Levante UD "B") GK; María Sampalo (Sevilla FC) GK; Imke Wübbenhorst (BV Cloppenburg) DF; Valentina Asenova (FC NSA Sofia) MF; Martina Capelli (RCD Espanyol) MF; Veronica Napoli (FC Twente) FW; Marina Martí (Fundación Albacete) FW; Alicia Muñoz (Fundación Albacete) FW; Noelia Aybar "Rivi" (RCD Espanyol) FW	Nazaret Lara (??) GK; Paula Perea (Real Betis) DF; Joyce Magalhães (Valencia CF) MF; Emma Marqués (FSF Móstoles) MF; Rocío Pizarro (Sevilla FC) MF
CD Transportes Alcaine	Minori Chiba (Urawa Red Diamonds) DF; Lydia Hastings (Herforder SV) MF; Laura Royo (CD Calanda) MF; Anita Velázquez (EDF Logoroño) MF; Maren Hauge Johansen (VCU Rams) FW; Veronica Maglia (ASD Torres Calcio) FW	Esther Sullastres (Valencia CF) GK; Ana Sáenz de Pipaón (EDF Logoroño) DF; Mariela Coronel (Atlético de Madrid) MF; Silvia Ruíz (EDF Logroño) MF
Valencia CF	Esther Sullastres (Transportes Alcaine) GK; Natalia Gaitán (CD Gol Star) MF; Joyce Magalhães (Sporting de Huelva) MF; Maya Yamamoto (Waseda University) MF; Ana Romero "Willy" (FC Barcelona) FW	María José Pons (CE Sabadell) GK; María Martí (retired) DF; Paula Arnal (UD Aldaia CF) MF; Mitsue Iwakura (??) MF; Ana Amo (UD Aldaia CF) FW; Manuela Lareo (Real Sociedad) FW

== See also ==
- Royal Spanish Football Federation
