= List of Spanish women's football transfers summer 2015 =

This is a list of Spanish women's football transfers in the summer transfer window 2015 by club. Primera División clubs are listed according to the 2015–16 season table.

== Primera División ==
=== In ===
- Source: Ligas Fútbol Femenino

Team	Goalkeepers	Defenders	Midfielders	Forwards
FC Barcelona	Paños (Levante)	Bergara (R. Sociedad)	(Portugal) Andreia (Cesarense); Del Río (Oviedo); Guijarro (Collerense)	García (Levante); Latorre (Espanyol)
Atlético Madrid			(Argentina) Coronel (Alcaine) (Mexico) Robles (Espanyol)	Bermúdez (Atlético)
Athletic Bilbao		Vicente (R. Sociedad)	Flaviano (Torres)	
Valencia CF	Sullastres (Alcaine)		(Brazil) Joyce (Sporting); Romero (Barcelona)	
Levante UD	Canals (Espanyol)	(Romania) Oprea (Sevilla)	López (Collerense)	(Mexico) Corral (Merilappi)
Rayo Vallecano	Vallés (Oviedo B)		Fernández (Madrid)	(Guatemala) Martínez (Dínamo) (Colombia) Regnier (Atlético B)
RCD Espanyol		Vergés (Levante L.P.)	Benito (St. Gabriel); Flores (Levante L.P.); León (St. Gabriel); Sevilla (St. Gabriel)	
Sporting Huelva	Sampalo (Sevilla)	González (Betis)	(Italy) Capelli (Espanyol) (Italy) Napoli (Twente) (Germany) Imke Wübbenhorst (Cloppenburg)	Aybar (Espanyol)
Santa Teresa CD		Arranz (Athletic)	Bodión (B.-Olivenza); García (St. Gabriel) (Israel) Redman (Pali Blues)	De Francisco (Sárdoma)
Oviedo Moderno	Otxoa (Athletic)		Muiña (Gijón); Santos (Gijón)	Gutiérrez (Marino)
Real Sociedad		Iparraguirre (Añorga); Soldevila (St. Gabriel)	Etxezarreta (Oiartzun); Leoz (Athletic); Mendoza (Espanyol)	Lareo (Valencia)
UD Collerense	Ortigosa (Pollença)		Busquets (Algaida)	
Alcaine Zaragoza			Velázquez (Logroño)	(Norway) Johansen (Virginia) (Switzerland) Maglia (Torres)
Fundación Albacete				
Oiartzun KE	Aldai (Añorga)	Hoyos (R. Sociedad)	Agoues (R. Sociedad); Altonaga (Athletic); Herrero (R. Sociedad); Luzuriaga (Tolosa); Olaizola (Mariño)	Bilbao (Athletic B)
UDG Tenerife Sur		Estella (Espanyol)	Tui (El Olivo)	Lázaro (Madrid)

- ^{1} On loan
- ^{2} Back from loan

=== Out ===
- Source: Liga Vasca Femenina

Team	Goalkeepers	Defenders	Midfielders	Forwards
FC Barcelona	Ashurst (free agent)		Romero (Valencia); Torrecilla (Montpellier)	Bermúdez (Atlético); Corredera (Arsenal)
Atlético Madrid	Ferreras (retired)			Ortega (S. Buccaneers)
Athletic Bilbao	Otxoa (Oviedo)	Arranz (Sta. Teresa)	Altonaga (Oiartzun); Leoz (R. Sociedad); Orueta (retired)	
Valencia CF	Pons (free agent)		Amo (Aldaia); Arnal (Aldaia) (Japan) Iwakura (retired); Martí (retired)	Lareo (R. Sociedad)
Levante UD	Paños (Barcelona)			García (Barcelona)
Rayo Vallecano	Yagüe (free agent)	Gudiel (free agent); Sánchez (free agent)	(Japan) Ohshima (free agent)	(Equatorial Guinea) Boho (Bristol A.)
RCD Espanyol	Canals (Levante)	Estella (Tenerife S.)	(Italy) Capelli (Sporting); Mendoza (R. Sociedad) (Mexico) Robles (Atlético)	Aybar (Sporting); Latorre (Barcelona)
Sporting Huelva	Lara (free agent)		(Brazil) Joyce (Valencia); Marqués (free agent); Pizarro (free agent)	
CD Santa Teresa			Del Estal (Logroño)	
Oviedo Moderno	Rodríguez (retired)	Sánchez (free agent)	Del Río (Barcelona); Fernández (retired)	
Real Sociedad		Bergara (Barcelona); Gabirondo (free agent); Hoyos (free agent); Vicente (Athletic)	Agoues (Oiartzun); Garmendia (free agent)	Agirre (Trojans)
UD Collerense			Guijarro (Barcelona); López (Levante)	
Alcaine Zaragoza	Sullastres (Valencia)	Sáenz de Pipaón (Logroño)	(Argentina) Coronel (Atlético) (Portugal) Oliveira (free agent); Ruiz (Logroño)	(Senegal) N'Diaye (Arras) (Mexico) Solís (free agent)
Fundación Albacete		Aroca (free agent)		
Oiartzun KE			Etxezarreta (R. Sociedad); Mendiable (free agent)	
UDG Tenerife Sur		Stewart (Arsenal)		

- ^{1} On loan
- ^{2} Back from loan

== See also ==
- 2015–16 Primera División (women)
