= 2012 Copa de la Reina de Fútbol =

Tournament details
- Country: Spain
- Teams: 4

Final positions
- Champions: Espanyol (6th title)
- Runners-up: Athletic Club

Tournament statistics
- Matches played: 3
- Goals scored: 7 (2.33 per match)
- Top goal scorer(s): Mari Paz Vilas (2 goals)

Awards
- Best player: Mari Paz Vilas

The 2012 Copa de la Reina de Fútbol was the 30th edition of the Spanish women's football national cup. It took place between 8 and 10 June in RFEF's Ciudad del Fútbol in Las Rozas, and it was contested following the end of the 2011–12 Primera División as a final four by the top four teams in the table, a major cut from the previous edition's fourteen contestants. On April 8, the defending champion Barcelona became the first team to qualify for the competition. Athletic Club and Espanyol also qualified in subsequent weeks, and Rayo Vallecano clinched the last spot by earning a 1–1 draw against contender Levante in the final date.

Espanyol won its sixth title to tie with Levante as the competition's most successful team by beating Rayo Vallecano in a penalty shootout and Athletic Club—who reached the final for the first time— after extra time. Mari Paz Vilas, who scored Espanyol's winning goal six minutes from the penalty shootout, was named the tournament's most valuable player.

When Espanyol were presented with the trophy, it still had the plaque from the previous edition; players Sara Mérida and Lara Rabal covered the plaque with tape and wrote their team name on it.

== Qualified teams ==
Top four positions of the 2011–12 Spanish First Division.

#	Team	Pld	W	D	L	GF	GA	Pt
1	Barcelona	34	21	1	2	119	19	94
2	Athletic Club	34	29	4	1	118	25	91
3	Espanyol	34	23	7	4	117	38	76
4	Rayo Vallecano	34	22	4	8	90	44	70
5	Levante	34	19	11	4	63	27	68
6	Atlético de Madrid	34	20	5	9	83	41	65
7	Real Sociedad	34	19	5	10	58	35	62
8	Sporting de Huelva	34	17	5	12	51	48	56

== Results ==
=== Semifinals ===
8 June 2012
19:30 (CEST)

Barcelona	0–2	Athletic Club
	Report	Fernández 37'; Flaviano 72'

Ciudad del Fútbol, Las Rozas
Referee: Gil Gozalo
8 June 2012
21:45 (CEST)

Espanyol	1–1 (a.e.t.)	Rayo Vallecano
Vilas 34'	Report	de Pablos 27'
Penalties
Gimbert (penalty scored); Torrejón (penalty missed); A. García (penalty scored); Vilas (penalty scored); Monforte (penalty scored); Meseguer (penalty scored); Serna (penalty scored); Mendoza (penalty scored)	7–6	(penalty scored) Hermoso; (penalty scored) Lázaro; (penalty scored) Pizarro; (penalty scored) López; (penalty missed) P. García; (penalty scored) Gudiel; (penalty scored) Vesga; (penalty missed) Gómez

Ciudad del Fútbol, Las Rozas
Referee: Bueno Prieto

=== Final ===
10 June 2012
11:00 (CEST)

Athletic Club	1–2 (a.e.t.)	Espanyol
Nabaskues 61'	Report	Pérez 48'; Vilas 114'

Ciudad del Fútbol, Las Rozas
Attendance: 500
Referee: Lesma López

Athletic Club	Espanyol

GK	1	(Spain) Ainhoa Tirapu
DF	10	(Spain) Iraia Iturregi
DF	22	(Spain) Irene Paredes	(yellow card) 60' (yellow-red card) 86'
DF	11	(Spain) Arrate Orueta	(yellow card) 85' (yellow-red card) 112'
DF	20	(Spain) Saioa González
MF	21	(Spain) Gurutze Fernández		(substituted off) 56'
MF	6	(Spain) Joana Flaviano		(substituted off) 88'
MF	16	(Spain) Amaia Olabarrieta	(yellow card) 99'	(substituted off) 116'
FW	17	(Spain) Eli Ibarra
FW	9	(Spain) Irune Murua		(substituted off) 50'
FW	19	(Spain) Erika Vázquez	(yellow card) 23'
Substitutes:
GK	13	(Spain) Andere Leguina
DF	3	(Spain) Joana Arranz		(substituted in) 88'
MF	4	(Spain) Itsaso Nabaskues		(substituted in) 56'
FW	7	(Spain) Nekane Díez		(substituted in) 50'
FW	12	(Spain) Manu Lareo		(substituted in) 116'
DF	14	(Spain) Elaia Gangoiti
MF	18	(Spain) Naiara Beristain
Manager:
(Spain) Juan Luis Fuentes

GK	1	(Spain) Mariajo
DF	5	(Spain) Marta Torrejón	(yellow card) 90'
DF	25	(Spain) Núria Mendoza
DF	10	(Spain) Vanesa Gimbert
DF	8	(Portugal) Sónia Matias		(substituted off) 113'
MF	4	(Spain) Andrea Pereira		(substituted off) 68'
MF	11	(Spain) Sara Monforte	(yellow card) 105'
MF	15	(Spain) Silvia Meseguer
MF	23	(Spain) Brenda Pérez
MF	4	(Spain) Débora García		(substituted off) 81'
FW	9	(Spain) Mari Paz Vilas
Substitutes:
GK	22	(Spain) Berta Noguera
FW	6	(Spain) Sara Serna	(yellow card) 98'	(substituted in) 68'
FW	20	(Spain) Aída García
MF	21	(Spain) Lara Rabal
FW	29	(Spain) Alba Pomares
MF	30	(Spain) Sara Navarro		(substituted in) 81'
FW	32	(Spain) Ariadna Forment		(substituted in) 113'
Manager:
(Spain) Luis Carrión
