= List of Santa Teresa CD seasons =

This is a list of seasons played by Santa Teresa CD, a women's football club from Badajoz, Extremadura that currently plays in the Spain's top-tier Primera División.

== Summary ==
Champions	Runners-up	Promoted	Relegated

Domestic and international results of Santa Teresa CD
Season	League										Cup	Europe	League top scorers					
Season	Tier	Division	Pos	P	W	D	L	F	A	Pts	Cup	Europe	1st	Goal	2nd	Goal	3rd	Goal
2011–12	2	Segunda División (Gr. 4)	6	26	12	6	8	48	41	42								
2012–13	2	Segunda División (Gr. 4)	3	26	17	2	7	71	28	53								
2013–14	2	Segunda División (Gr. 4)	1	26	23	2	1	88	18	70								
2014–15	1	Primera División	9	30	9	7	14	33	53	34								
2015–16	1	Primera División	11	30	9	5	16	43	62	32			(Spain) Lima	15	(Spain) Barea ^{N}	6	(Equatorial Guinea) Martins	6
2016–17	1	Primera División	9	30	10	6	14	28	46	36			(Spain) Lima	10	(Spain) Martín	4	(Spain) Melchor	3
