= María Miret =

Spanish footballer (born 1995)

Personal information
- Full name: María Miret Bofí
- Date of birth: 13 May 1995 (age 31)
- Place of birth: Xeraco, Valencia, Spain
- Height: 1.75 m (5 ft 9 in)
- Position: Midfielder

Senior career*
Years	Team	Apps	(Gls)
2010–2013	Levante	9	(1)
2013–2014	Sant Gabriel	14	(0)
2014–2015	TJC Apaches		
- * Club domestic league appearances and goals as of 10:03, 7 September 2021 (UTC)

María Miret Bofí (born 13 May 1995) is a Spanish retired football midfielder.

== Career ==
Miret started playing football from 11 years old and quickly progressed through the academy at Levante. Miret has represented Spain at under-17 and under-19 level.

== Personal life ==
In 2015, Miret appeared in the Spanish reality television series Cámbiame. After playing soccer in the United States, she took up CrossFit training. She continued this when she lived in China, where she also took up teaching. She participated in the 2019 Asia CrossFit Championship and was the only Spanish participant. On 27 December 2019, she married Inés Suanzes in Las Vegas, who she met while in Texas. In October 2020, Miret and her wife were both asked to leave China by the Chinese government due to Suanzes testing positive for having COVID-19 antibodies in her system.
