= Anair Lomba =

Spanish footballer (born 1989)

Personal information
- Full name: Anair Lomba Álvarez
- Date of birth: 30 November 1989 (age 36)
- Place of birth: Spain
- Height: 1.62 m (5 ft 4 in)
- Position: Striker

Senior career*
Years	Team	Apps	(Gls)
–2017	Espanyol		
2017–2019	Valencia	34	(4)
2019–2021	Espanyol	34	(7)

International career
- Galicia
- * Club domestic league appearances and goals

Anair Lomba Álvarez (born 30 November 1989) is a Spanish footballer who played as a striker.

== Early life ==
Lomba was born in 1989 in Spain. She joined the youth academy of Spanish side Barcelona at the age of thirteen.

== Career ==
Lomba signed for Spanish side Espanyol. In 2017, she signed for Spanish side Valencia. In 2019, she returned to Spanish side Espanyol. She was described as "former captain of Espanyol and a reference for women's football in Spain".

== Personal life ==
Lomba is a native of Galicia, Spain. She has been nicknamed "Lombi".
