= Laura Royo =

Spanish footballer (born 1999)

Personal information
- Full name: Laura Royo Sanjuán
- Date of birth: 9 February 1999 (age 27)
- Place of birth: Alloza, Spain
- Height: 1.67 m (5 ft 6 in)
- Position: Forward

Senior career*
Years	Team	Apps	(Gls)
2013–2015	Calanda		
2015–2016	Zaragoza CFF B		
2015–2018	Zaragoza CFF	50	(3)
2018–2022	Villarreal	35+	(4+)
2022–2026	SD Huesca	55	(17)
- * Club domestic league appearances and goals as of 1 July 2026

Laura Royo Sanjuán (born 9 February 1999) is a Spanish former footballer who played as a forward before her retirement in July 2026.

== Club career ==
Royo started her career at Calanda.
