= Mariví Simó =

Spanish footballer (born 1983)

Personal information
- Full name: Mariví Simó Marco
- Date of birth: 25 April 1983 (age 43)
- Place of birth: Valencia, Spain
- Height: 1.56 m (5 ft 1 in)
- Position: Defender

Senior career*
Years	Team	Apps	(Gls)
2002–2005	Levante B		
2005–2016	Levante	71	(0)
- * Club domestic league appearances and goals

Mariví Simó Marco is a retired Spanish football defender, who played for Levante UD all her entire career.

In July 2016, Mariví received a homage by her one-club career.

== Titles ==
- 1 league: 2008
- 1 national cup: 2007
