= Mely Solís =

Mexican footballer (born 1986)

Personal information
- Full name: Manuela Solís Cabrales
- Date of birth: 29 June 1986 (age 40)
- Place of birth: Victoria de Durango, Mexico
- Position: Forward

International career
Years	Team	Apps	(Gls)
- Mexico

Mely Solís (born 29 June 1986) is a Mexico former footballer who played as a forward for Transportes Alcaine in Liga F. After leaving Spain Solis returned to Mexico to play for Universidad Juárez del Estado de Durango.
