= Amparito =

Spanish footballer (born 1997)

Personal information
- Full name: Amparo Delgado Vega
- Date of birth: 18 February 1995 (age 31)
- Place of birth: Seville, Spain
- Height: 1.52 m (5 ft 0 in)
- Position: Midfielder

Team information
- Current team: Sevilla
- Number: 15

Senior career*
Years	Team	Apps	(Gls)
2008–2023	Sevilla	181+	(8+)
- * Club domestic league appearances and goals as of 18:05, 7 January 2023 (UTC)

Amparo Delgado Vega (born 18 February 1997), better known as Amparito, is a Spanish footballer who plays as a midfielder for Sevilla.

== Club career ==
Amparito started her career at Sevilla.
