= Paloma Lázaro =

Spanish footballer (born 1993)

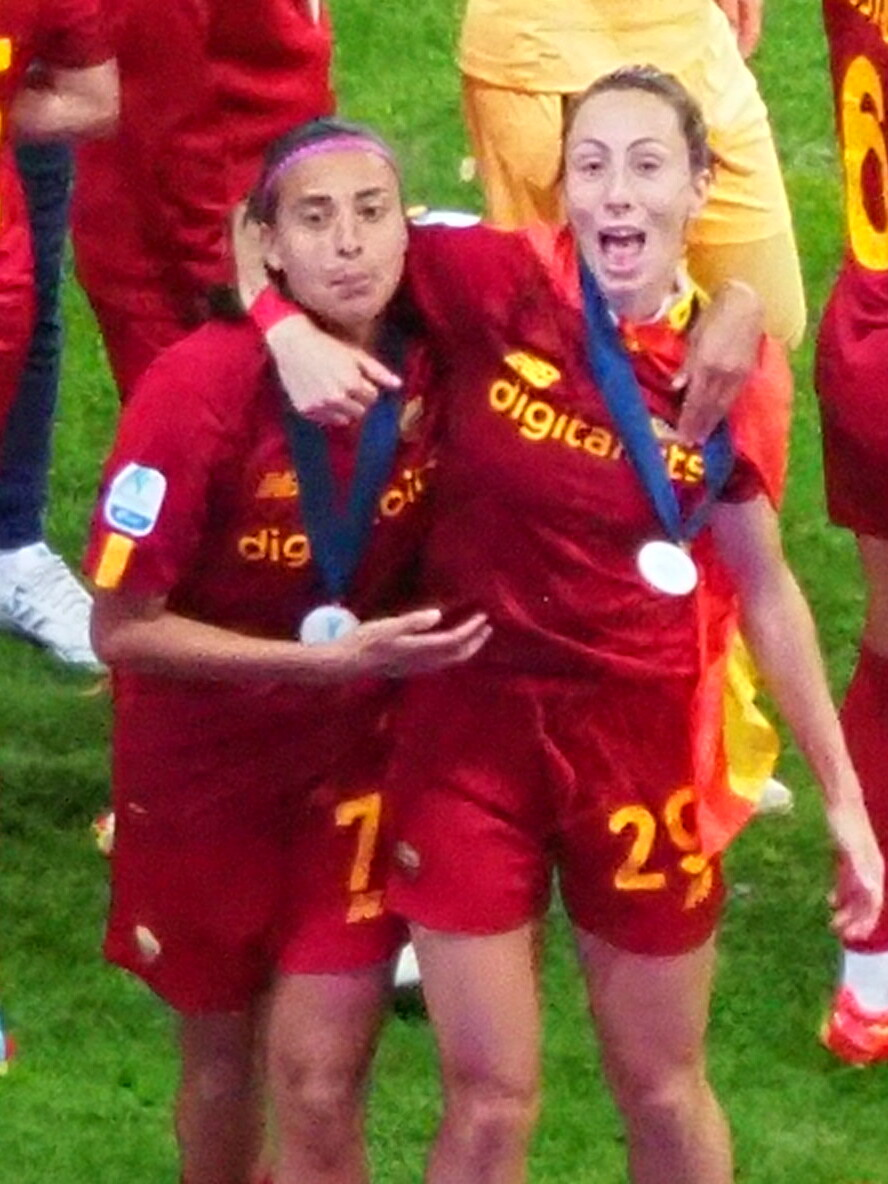
- Andressa Alves (left), and Paloma Lázaro (right) celebrate winning the 2022 Supercoppa Italiana

Personal information
- Full name: Paloma Lázaro Torres del Molino
- Date of birth: 28 September 1993 (age 33)
- Place of birth: Madrid, Spain
- Height: 1.67 m (5 ft 6 in)
- Position: Right winger

Team information
- Current team: Servette
- Number: 29

Senior career*
Years	Team	Apps	(Gls)
2010–2014	Rayo Vallecano	75	(8)
2014–2015	Madrid CFF		
2015–2019	Granadilla	90	(19)
2019	Pink Bari	11	(6)
2019–2020	Fiorentina	10	(4)
2020–2023	Roma	51	(18)
2023	Parma	12	(3)
2023–2024	Napoli	23	(2)
2024–	Servette	11	(0)

International career
2010	Spain U17	10	(11)
2011–2012	Spain U19		
- * Club domestic league appearances and goals as of 17 September 2023

Paloma Lázaro Torres del Molino (born 28 September 1993) is a Spanish professional footballer who plays as a right winger who plays for Servette.

== Club career ==
At Rayo Vallecano, Lázaro was part of the squad that won the team's third consecutive league title in the 2010–11 season. In 2019, Lázaro left Spain to join Italian club Pink Bari, which was shortly followed by a transfer to Fiorentina. After struggling to break into the Fiorentina team, Lázaro signed for Roma in July 2020, replacing the outbound Amalie Thestrup. She has commented on the success of this transfer due to Roma electing to play her in her desired position of forward.

Lázaro scored within twenty minutes of her Serie A debut for Roma on 23 August 2020 against Sassuolo. Lázaro then followed that up with a run of form that included five goals in her first six appearances for her new club. That personal run included the victory over San Marino on 17 October 2020, where Lázaro scored her first brace for Roma.

In total, Lázaro scored 8 league goals and created 3 Serie A assists in 21 league appearances during her first season with A.S. Roma. She finished as the club's second-highest scorer in the league was Roma's joint-leading player with Annamaria Serturini for goals and assists combined. Despite Lázaro's promising form, Roma finished fifth in Serie A and reached their lowest league finish in the club's first three seasons of Serie A football. Nonetheless, Lázaro was a part of the Roma 2021 Coppa Italia victory over AC Milan on 30 May 2021. The Spaniard collected a winner's medal as she helped Roma win the first major trophy in the club's history on the women's side of the sport.

== International career ==
Lázaro represented Spain in the 2010 U-17 World Cup and 2010 U-17 European Championship.

== Style of play ==
Lázaro has described herself as "a forward who likes to get on the ball." She claims her "real strength is in one-on-one situations" and that she does not have a fixed position, claiming she prefers "to be able to move across the frontline." Lázaro shows an ability to come deep and receive the ball in between the opponent's defensive lines, which can help create space for her teammates to make runs onto goal and find themselves receiving through-balls from Lázaro. She also shows competitive hold-up play, able to shield the ball with her back to goal. Her dribbling technique is a skill she uses to carry the ball out wide, while her ability in the air makes her a goalscoring threat from open play and set pieces.
