= Sara Navarro =

Spanish footballer (born 1995)

Personal information
- Full name: Sara Navarro Rivera
- Date of birth: 21 August 1995 (age 31)
- Place of birth: Sabadell, Spain
- Height: 1.53 m (5 ft 0 in)
- Positions: Forward; midfielder

Team information
- Current team: Eibar
- Number: 21

Senior career*
Years	Team	Apps	(Gls)
2009–2014	Espanyol	24	(1)
2014–2015	Seagull		
2015–2016	Levante Las Planas		
2016–2017	Seagull		
2017–2019	Fundación Albacete	50	(6)
2019–2020	Sporting de Huelva	10	(0)
2020–2022	Eibar	44	(10)
2022	FC Levante Las Planas		
2022–2023	Deportivo de A Coruña		
2023–2025	CE Europa		
- * Club domestic league appearances and goals as of 20:27, 30 October 2021 (UTC)

Sara Navarro Rivera (born 21 August 1995) is a Spanish footballer who has played as a forward and midfielder for various clubs including Eibar, Deportivo de A Coruña, and many more.

== Club career ==
Navarro started her career at Espanyol.
