= Joyce Borini =

Brazilian footballer (born 1988)

Personal information
- Full name: Joyce Magalhães Borini
- Date of birth: 22 March 1988 (age 38)
- Place of birth: São Paulo, Brazil
- Height: 1.65 m (5 ft 5 in)
- Positions: Centre back; attacking midfielder

Senior career*
Years	Team	Apps	(Gls)
2010–2011	San Nicasio		
2011–2012	Tres Cantos		
2012–2013	Torrejón		
2013–2014	Rayo Vallecano	26	(0)
2014–2015	Sporting Huelva	29	(13)
2015–2018	Valencia	86	(10)
2018–2020	Granadilla	45	(5)
2020–2021	Madrid CFF	27	(0)
2021–2022	Roma	5	(0)
2022–2023	Como	22	(0)
2023–2024	Sion		
2024–2025	Yverdon Sport		
2025–2026	1. FC Magdeburg		

International career
2017–2019	Brazil	6	(0)
- * Club domestic league appearances and goals as of 27 August 2022

Joyce Magalhães Borini (born 22 March 1988) is a Brazilian professional footballer who plays as a centre back. She is currently a free agent, having most recently played for the German club 1. FC Magdeburg.

== Career ==
She previously played for Spanish Primera División club Madrid CFF.

Borini first played in Primera with Rayo Vallecano in the 2013–14 season, and subsequently moved to Sporting Huelva and Valencia CF before signing for Granadilla in 2018. In November 2017 she first played for the Brazilian national team in a friendly against Chile.

She played for Italian Serie A club Roma.

On 7 November 2025, Borini signed with German Regionalliga Nordost club 1.FC Magdeburg, continuing her career in European football. In January 2026, she left the club and became a free agent.

== Honours ==
Sporting Huelva

- Copa de la Reina: 2015
