= María Estella =

Spanish footballer (born 1994)

Personal information
- Full name: María Estella del Valle
- Date of birth: 10 June 1994 (age 32)
- Place of birth: Sant Feliu de Guíxols, Spain
- Height: 1.70 m (5 ft 7 in)
- Position: Defender

Senior career*
Years	Team	Apps	(Gls)
2009–2012	L'Estartit	55+	
2012–2014	Sant Gabriel	50	(2)
2014–2015	Espanyol	25	(1)
2015–2026	Granadilla	144	(10)

International career
2014–2019	Catalonia	5	(0)
- * Club domestic league appearances and goals as of 13:19, 17 April 2022 (UTC)

María Estella del Valle (born 10 June 1994) is a Spanish footballer who plays as a defender.

== Club career ==
Estella started her career at L'Estartit.
