= Imke Wübbenhorst =

German football manager

Imke Wübbenhorst (born 10 December 1988) is a German football manager and former player who manages YB.

== Playing career ==
As midfielder, Wübbenhorst played in Germany and Spain.

== Managerial career ==
In 2018, Wübbenhorst was appointed manager of the men's team of German side BV Cloppenburg. In 2020, she was appointed manager of the men's team of German side Sportfreunde Lotte. When asked by a journalist whether her players should cover up in the dressing room, she sarcastically responded by saying "Of course not. I am a pro. I pick the team on penis size".

In 2022, she was appointed manager of Swiss side YB.
