= Marina Agoues =

Spanish footballer (born 1992)

Personal information
- Full name: Marina Agoues Márquez
- Date of birth: 14 December 1992 (age 33)
- Place of birth: Zarautz, Spain
- Position: Midfielder

Team information
- Current team: Eibar

Senior career*
Years	Team	Apps	(Gls)
- Zarautz
2009–2014	Real Sociedad	131	(10)
2014–2015	Riviera di Romagna		
2015	Real Sociedad	13	(0)
2015–2017	Oiartzun	52	(3)
2017–2018	Santa Teresa	8	(0)
2018–	Eibar		

International career
- Spain U19
2012–	Basque Country	1	(0)
- * Club domestic league appearances and goals

Marina Agoues Márquez is a Spanish football striker, currently playing for SD Eibar.

As an Under-19 international she played the 2011 U-19 European Championship.
