= Ainoa Campo =

Spanish footballer (born 1996)

Personal information
- Full name: Ainoa Campo Franco
- Date of birth: 17 June 1996 (age 30)
- Place of birth: Palencia, Spain
- Height: 1.62 m (5 ft 4 in)
- Position: Midfielder

Team information
- Current team: Espanyol
- Number: 8

Senior career*
Years	Team	Apps	(Gls)
2011–2013	Rayo Simancas		
2013–2015	Parquesol		
2015–2018	Atlético Madrid	8	(0)
2017	→ Rayo Vallecano (loan)	12	(0)
2018	→ Madrid CFF (loan)		
2018–2019	Madrid CFF	14	(0)
2019–2020	CD Tacón	19	(0)
2020–2021	Deportivo La Coruña	30	(3)
2021–	Villarreal	15	(0)
- * Club domestic league appearances and goals as of 22:41, 22 February 2022 (UTC)

Ainoa Campo Franco (born 17 June 1996) is a Spanish professional footballer who plays as a midfielder for Liga F club Espanyol.

== Club career ==
Campo started her career at Rayo Simancas.
