= Sónia Matias =

Portuguese footballer

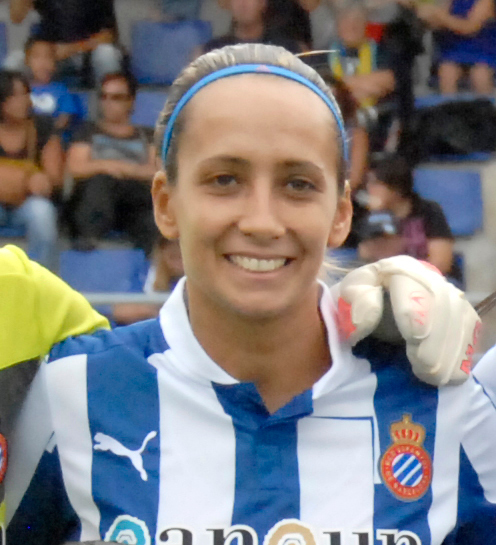
- Matias in 2012

Personal information
- Full name: Sónia Patricia Pereira Matias
- Date of birth: 17 May 1983 (age 43)
- Place of birth: Loures, Portugal
- Height: 1.69 m (5 ft 7 in)
- Position: Defender

Senior career*
Years	Team	Apps	(Gls)
- S.U. 1º de Dezembro
2007–2010	Prainsa Zaragoza	57	(9)
2010–2014	RCD Espanyol	105	(5)

International career
2005–2012	Portugal	55	(4)
- * Club domestic league appearances and goals

Sónia Patricia Pereira Matias (born 17 May 1983) is a Portuguese former football defender who played for Prainsa Zaragoza and RCD Espanyol of Spain's Primera División. She also played for SU 1º Dezembro in Portugal's Campeonato Nacional. With the Portugal national team she won 55 caps between 2005 and 2012, scoring four goals.

She ended her playing career in summer 2014, after Espanyol decided not to renew her contract. She remained in Catalonia and in October 2014 she took a job as women's football co-ordinator at Molins de Rei CF.
