= Brenda Pérez =

Spanish footballer (born 1993)

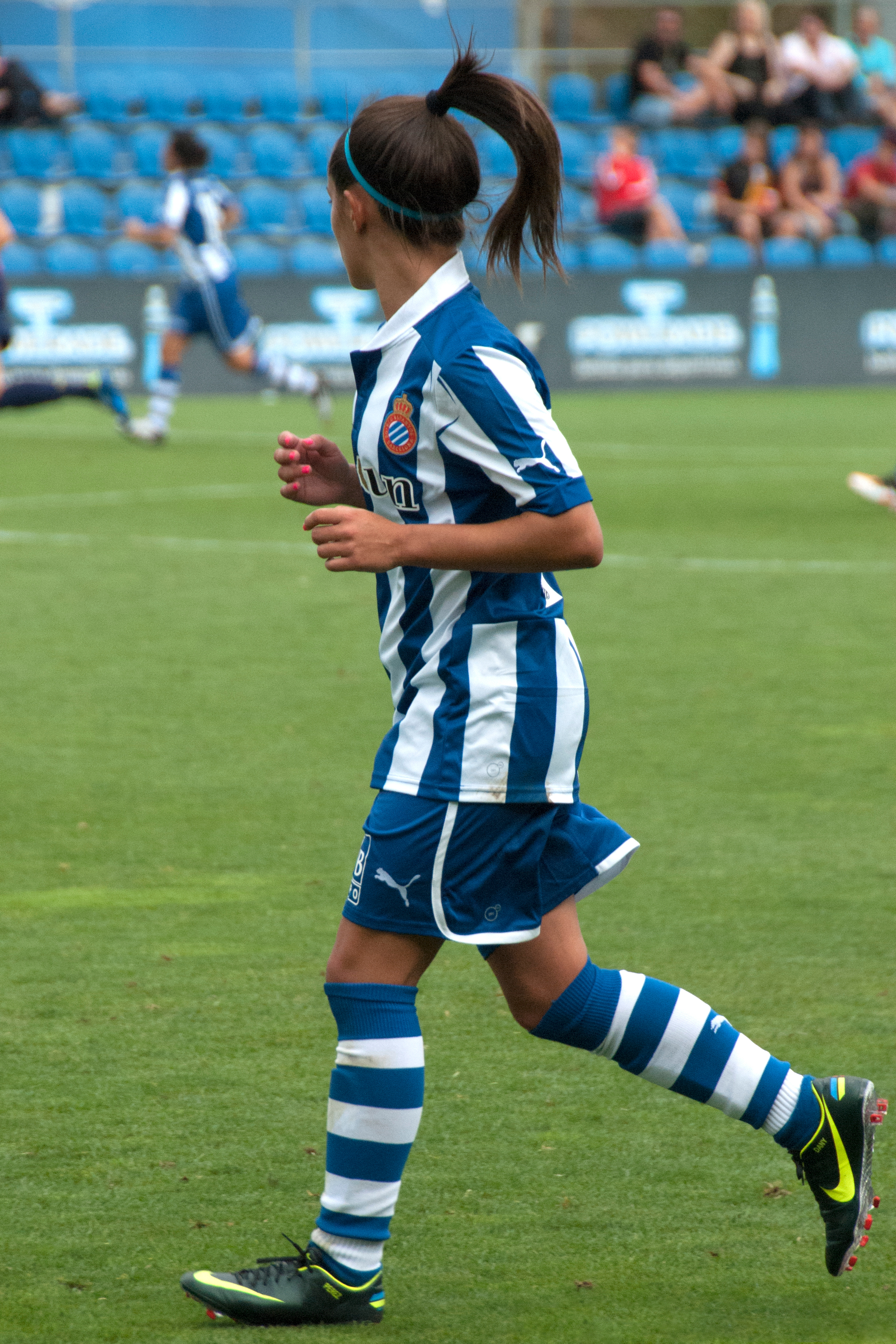
- Pérez with Espanyol

Personal information
- Full name: Brenda Pérez Soler
- Date of birth: 27 June 1993 (age 33)
- Place of birth: Vilassar de Mar, Spain
- Height: 1.54 m (5 ft 1 in)
- Position: Midfielder

Team information
- Current team: Sporting
- Number: 11

Youth career
- 2007–2011: Espanyol

Senior career*
Years	Team	Apps	(Gls)
2011–2013	Espanyol	8	(4)
2013	Sant Gabriel	0	(0)
2014	Valencia	0	(0)
2014–2015	Atlético Madrid	0	(0)
2015–2016	Canillas	0	(0)
2016–2021	Espanyol	109	(2)
2021–	Sporting	60	(17)

International career
2015–2019	Catalonia	3	(0)
- * Club domestic league appearances and goals as of 19 October 2024

Brenda Pérez Soler (born 27 June 1993) is a Spanish footballer who plays as a midfielder for Campeonato Nacional Feminino club Sporting.

== Career ==
Pérez started her career with Spanish top flight side Espanyol, helping them win the 2012 Copa de la Reina de Fútbol. In 2015, she signed for Canillas in the Spanish second tier. In 2016, Pérez returned to Spanish top flight club Espanyol.

In 2021, she signed for Sporting in Portugal, helping them win the 2022 Taça de Portugal Feminina.

== Honours ==
Espanyol

- Copa de la Reina: 2012

Sporting

- Taça de Portugal: 2021–22
- Supertaça de Portugal: 2021, 2024
