= Ane Etxezarreta =

Spanish footballer (born 1995)

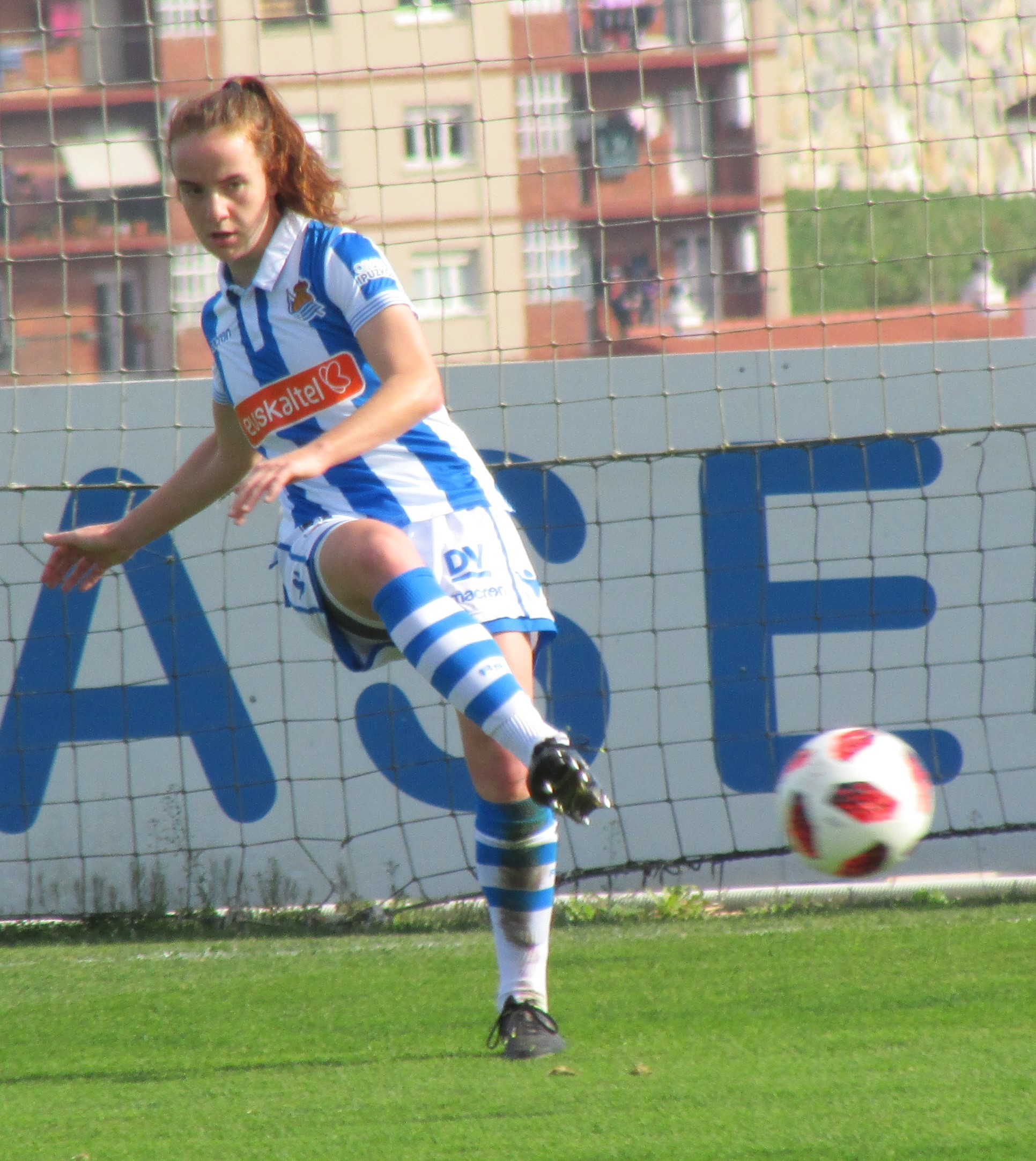

Personal information
- Full name: Ane Etxezarreta Ayerbe
- Date of birth: 24 August 1995 (age 31)
- Place of birth: Beasain, Spain
- Height: 1.66 m (5 ft 5 in)
- Position: Defender

Youth career
- 2010–2011: Beasain

Senior career*
Years	Team	Apps	(Gls)
2011–2013	Beasain		
2013–2015	Oiartzun		
2015–2025	Real Sociedad	166	(10)
2025–2026	SD Eibar	21	(0)

International career^{‡}
2022–	Basque Country	1	(0)
- * Club domestic league appearances and goals as of 1 July 2026 (UTC)~ ‡ National team caps and goals as of 07:27, 17 December 2023 (UTC)~

Ane Etxezarreta Ayerbe (born 24 August 1995, also spelled as Ane Etxezarreta Aierbe) is a Spanish footballer who plays as a defender.

== Career ==
Etxezarreta started her club career at hometown club Beasain, then played for Oiartzun. She has played more than 170 games for Real Sociedad. She was a member of the group which won the 2018–19 Copa de la Reina and finished as runners-up in the 2021–22 Primera División.

She has been selected for the unofficial Basque Country women's national football team which plays only occasionally, making her first appearance in December 2022 against Chile.
