= Estela Fernández =

Spanish footballer (born 1991)

Personal information
- Full name: Estela Fernández Pablos
- Date of birth: 9 May 1991 (age 35)
- Place of birth: Madrid, Spain
- Height: 1.69 m (5 ft 7 in)
- Position: Midfielder

Team information
- Current team: Real Betis
- Number: 21

Senior career*
Years	Team	Apps	(Gls)
2009–2011	Rayo Vallecano B		
2011–2014	Pozuelo		
2014–2015	Madrid CFF		
2015–2018	Rayo Vallecano	74	(4)
2018–2023	Madrid CFF	111	(15)
2023–2024	Valencia	18	(0)
2024–	Real Betis	4	(0)
- * Club domestic league appearances and goals as of 18:26, 16 November 2024 (UTC)

Estela Fernández Pablos (born 9 May 1991) is a Spanish footballer who plays as a midfielder for Real Betis.

== Club career ==
Fernández started her career at Rayo Vallecano B. In September 2018, she transferred from Rayo Vallecano to Madrid CFF. She had previously played for the latter club three seasons before. In the 2018–19 Primera División season, she was top goalscorer for Madrid CFF with 10 goals.

== Personal life ==
Since 2017, Fernández has been a police officer for the National Police Corps. She also holds a degree in law.
