= Alba Pomares =

Spanish footballer (born 1995)

Personal information
- Full name: Alba Pomares López
- Date of birth: 29 August 1995 (age 31)
- Place of birth: Barcelona, Spain
- Height: 1.55 m (5 ft 1 in)
- Position: Forward

Team information
- Current team: Fundación Albacete

Senior career*
Years	Team	Apps	(Gls)
2010–2017	Espanyol	116	(9)
2017–	Fundación Albacete	58	(11)

International career
2011–2012	Spain U17		
- * Club domestic league appearances and goals as of 12:13, 17 August 2021 (UTC)

Alba Pomares López (born 29 August 1995) is a Spanish football forward currently playing for Fundación Albacete.

== Club career ==
Pomares missed just under a year of football after injuring her anterior cruciate ligament in a match against Fundación Albacete while playing for Espanyol. After playing seven seasons at Espanyol, she left the Catalan club and signed with Fundación Albacete in 2017. In her first season at Albacete, she, again, injured her anterior cruciate ligament, this time against Levante, and faced another lengthy absence.

== International career ==
Pomares scored the only goal in extra time of the final of the 2011 U-17 European Championship against France to give the Spanish U-17 national team its second European Championship title in a row. Following the match, her teammates all signed the ball, which she kept as a souvenir. She also received a congratulatory phone call from Spain international Verónica Boquete.
