= Aintzane Encinas =

Spanish footballer (born 1988)

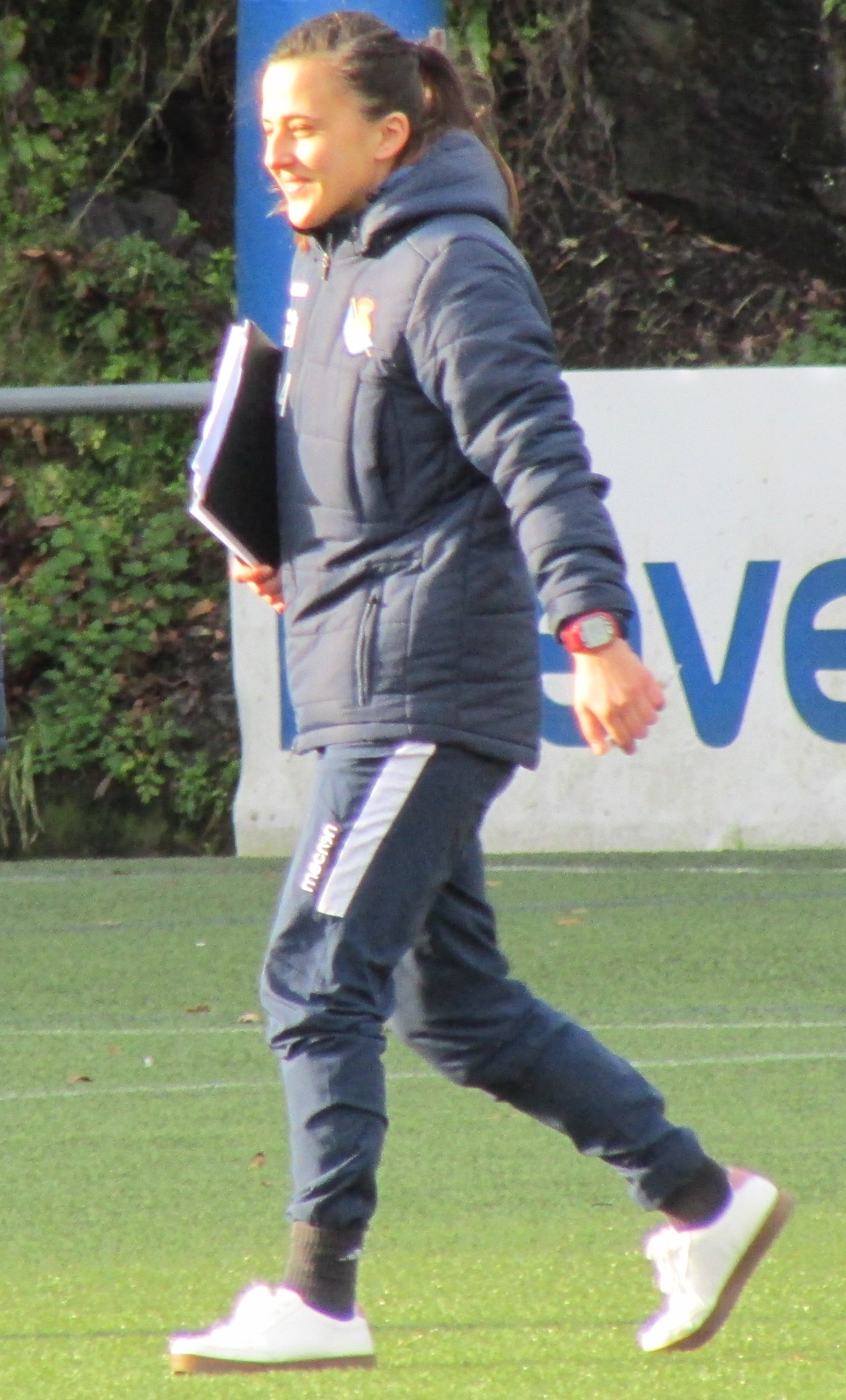
- Encinas in 2019

Personal information
- Full name: Aintzane Encinas Gómez
- Date of birth: 22 April 1988 (age 38)
- Place of birth: San Sebastián, Basque Country
- Height: 1.62 m (5 ft 4 in)
- Position: Striker

Senior career*
Years	Team	Apps	(Gls)
2003–2004	Añorga		
2004–2017	Real Sociedad	311	(53)

International career
2012–2017	Basque Country	4	(2)
- * Club domestic league appearances and goals

Aintzane Encinas Gómez is a retired Spanish football striker.

== Career ==
After playing one first season at Añorga, Encinas joined Real Sociedad, where she played 13 seasons, most of them in Primera División, before retiring. She writes a column on the team's games for Marca.

== International career ==
As an Under-19 international she took part in the 2004 U-19 World Championship.
