= Mitsue Iwakura =

Japanese footballer who played for Atlético Madrid and Valencia

Personal information
- Date of birth: 18 August 1984 (age 42)
- Height: 1.54 m (5 ft 1 in)
- Position: Forward

Senior career*
Years	Team	Apps	(Gls)
2012–2013	Atlético Madrid	24	(1)
2013–2015	Valencia	46	(1)
- * Club domestic league appearances and goals

Mitsue Iwakura (born August 18, 1984) is a Japanese footballer, who played for Atlético Madrid and Valencia.
