= Eli del Estal =

Spanish footballer (born 1993)

Personal information
- Full name: Elisa del Estal Mateu
- Date of birth: 23 March 1993 (age 33)
- Place of birth: Santander, Spain
- Height: 1.73 m (5 ft 8 in)
- Position: Forward

Team information
- Current team: Como 1907
- Number: 9

Senior career*
Years	Team	Apps	(Gls)
2012–2015	Reocín		
2015–2016	Fundación Albacete	39	(6)
2016–2020	Espanyol	102	(23)
2020–2021	Red Angels		(8)
2021–2022	Sevilla	28	(9)
2023–2024	Napoli	24	(6)
2024–2025	FC Como	11	(5)
2025–	Como 1907		
- * Club domestic league appearances and goals as of November 2024

Elisa del Estal Mateu (born 23 March 1993) is a Spanish footballer who plays as a forward for Como 1907.

== Club career ==
Eli del Estal started her career at Reocín. Her twin sister Sara is also a footballer; they were teammates at Reocín, and for one season at Espanyol.
