= Bárbara Latorre =

Spanish footballer

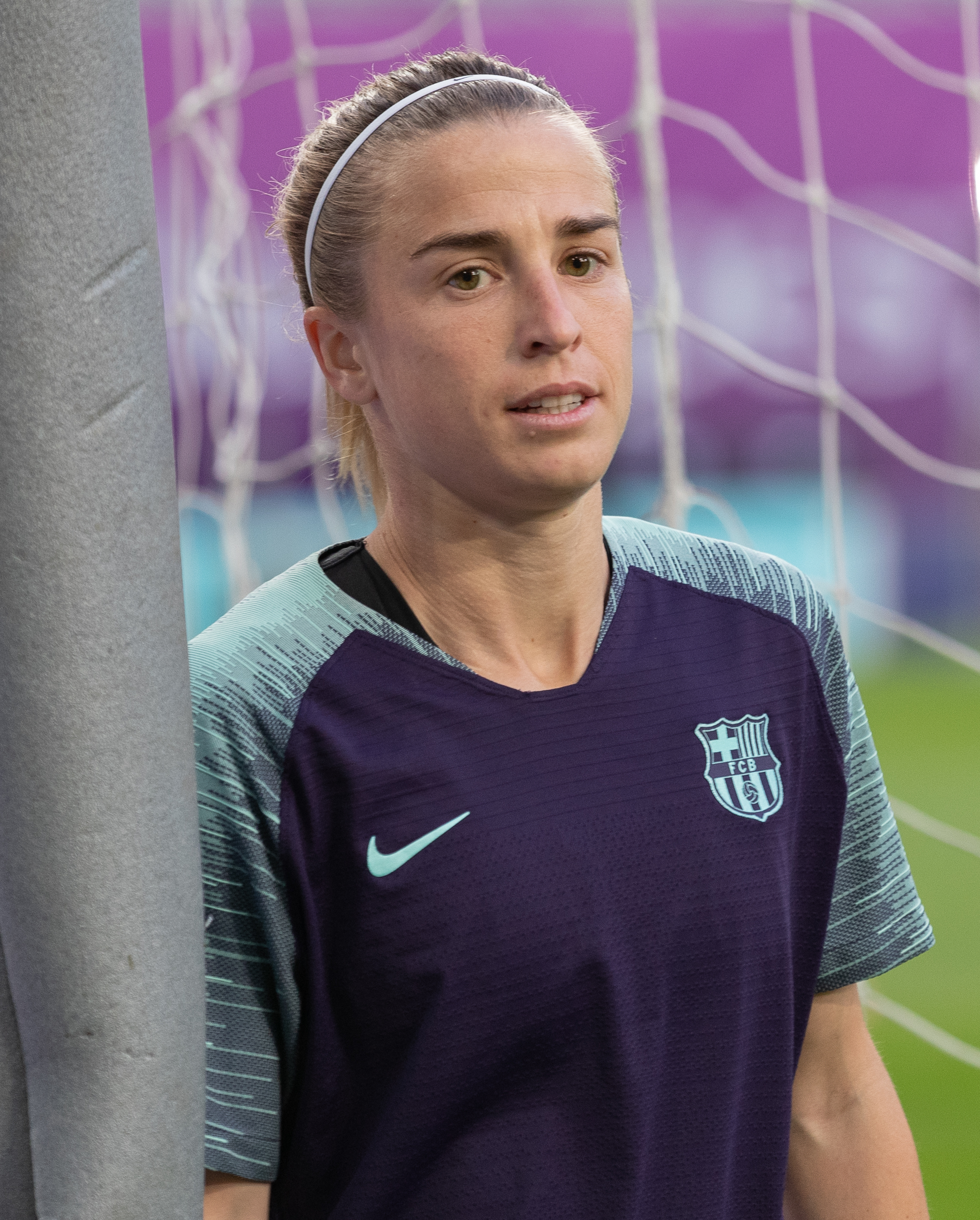
- Latorre with Barcelona in 2019

Personal information
- Full name: Bárbara Latorre Viñals
- Date of birth: 14 March 1993 (age 33)
- Place of birth: Zaragoza, Spain
- Height: 1.64 m (5 ft 4 1/2 in)
- Position: Winger

Team information
- Current team: Levante Las Planas (on loan from Roma)

Senior career*
Years	Team	Apps	(Gls)
2011–2013	Prainsa Zaragoza	60	(33)
2013–2015	Espanyol	55	(19)
2015–2019	Barcelona	85	(28)
2019–2021	Real Sociedad	42	(10)
2021–2023	Atlético Madrid	26	(7)
2023–	Roma	0	(0)
2024–	→ Levante Las Planas (loan)	0	(0)

International career^{‡}
2016–2021	Spain	22	(1)
- * Club domestic league appearances and goals as of 25 October 2021 ‡ National team caps and goals as of 26 October 2021

Bárbara Latorre Viñals (born 14 March 1993) is a Spanish professional footballer who is currently playing as a forward for Liga F club Levante Las Planas, on loan from Serie A club A.S. Roma. She previously played for Prainsa Zaragoza, Real Sociedad Femenino, Espanyol, Barcelona, with which she has also played the UEFA Women's Champions League, and Atlético Madrid.

== Club career ==
Latorre began her senior career as a futsal player in Spanish Women Futsal Championship, until in 2011 her goalscoring abilities attracted the attention of the Primera División club Prainsa Zaragoza that required a forward player for their reserve team. She spent two years at the club quickly becoming one of their first team players and in her second season at the club she and her teammates became the runner-up at Copa de la Reina losing the final to Barcelona, as well as taking the 7th spot on the year end table in Primera División.

Latorre refused to renew her contract with Zaragoza at the end of 2012–13 season and decided to join the then ranked 5th club Espanyol. At the end of her first season at Espanyol she managed to find a place among the top 11 goalscorers of the 2013–14 season with 13 goals, becoming the club's top scorer.

In 2015 Latorre joined the four consecutive league champion Barcelona after the departure of some of their key players and quickly established herself as one of their most important players in forward position scoring 9 goals throughout the 2015–16 Championship mid-season.

== International career ==
Her match debut happened on 15 September 2016, coming on as a substitute during Spain's UEFA Women's Euro 2017 qualifying 13–0 win against Montenegro in Las Rozas de Madrid.

== International goals ==
No.	Date	Venue	Opponent	Score	Result	Competition
1.	23 October 2017	Ramat Gan Stadium, Ramat Gan, Israel	Israel	0–4	0–6	2019 FIFA Women's World Cup qualification

== Honours ==
Barcelona

- Copa de la Reina: 2017, 2018

Atlético Madrid

- Copa de la Reina: 2022–23

Spain

- Algarve Cup: Winner 2017
- Cyprus Cup: 2018
