= Mariela Coronel =

Argentine footballer (born 1981)

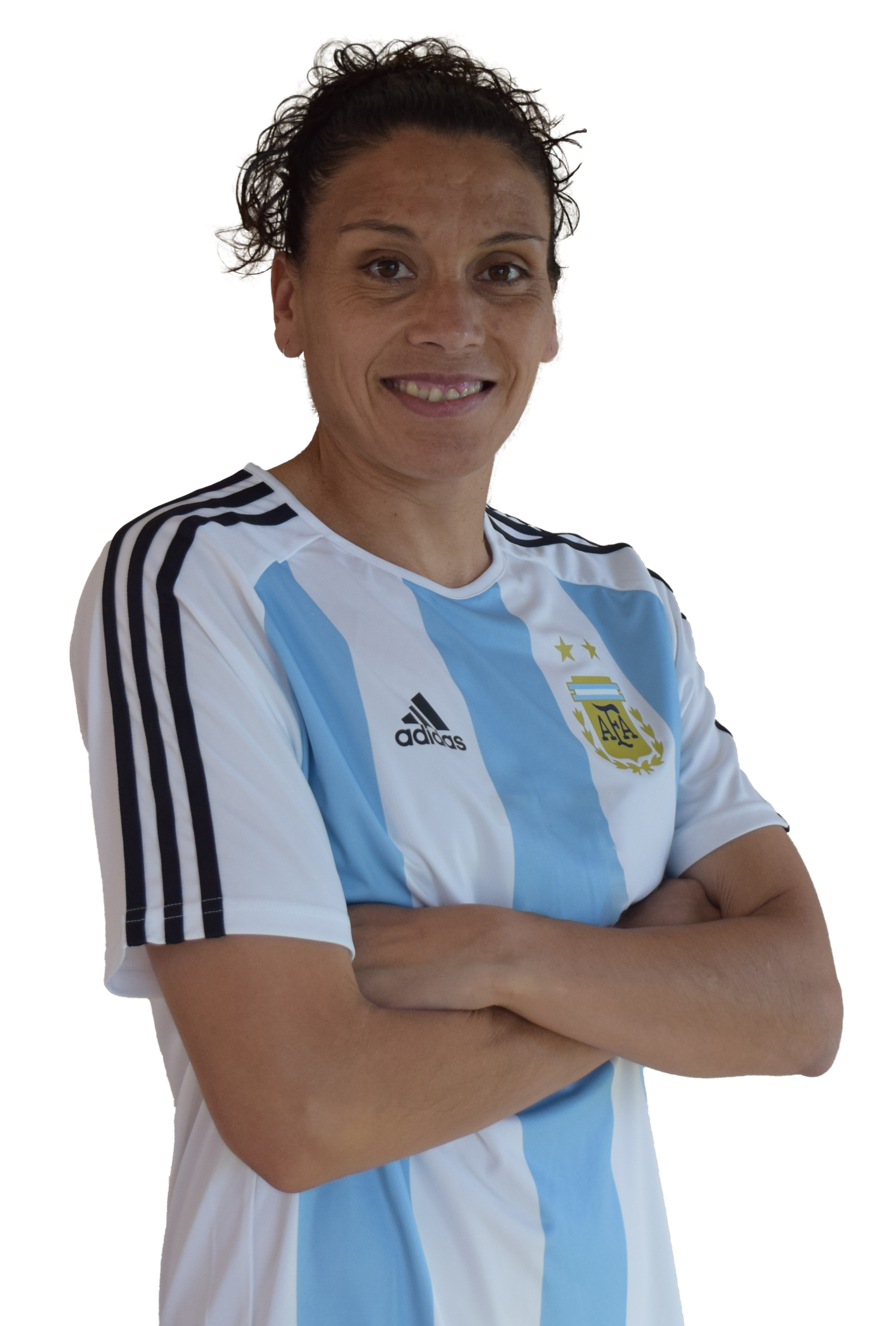

Personal information
- Full name: Mariela del Carmen Coronel
- Date of birth: 20 June 1981 (age 45)
- Place of birth: Santiago del Estero, Argentina
- Height: 1.70 m (5 ft 7 in)
- Position: Midfielder

Senior career*
Years	Team	Apps	(Gls)
2000–2004	Independiente		
2004–2007	San Lorenzo		
2007–2015	Zaragoza CFF	211	(36)
2015–2016	Atlético Madrid	19	(0)
2016–2017	Madrid CFF		
2017–2020	Granada	20+	(1+)
2020–2021	Villarreal	24	(1)
2021–2022	Alhama	33	(6)
2023–2025	Rayo Vallecano	51	(5)

International career
2003–	Argentina	18	(2)
Medal record
Women's football
Representing Argentina
Copa América Femenina
First place	2006 Argentina
Pan American Games
Silver medal – second place	2019 Lima	Team
- * Club domestic league appearances and goals as of 18 April 2023

Mariela del Carmen Coronel (born 20 June 1981) is an Argentine professional footballer who plays as a midfielder. She previously played for Club Atlético Independiente and San Lorenzo de Almagro in her country, as well as Villarreal CF, CD Transportes Alcaine, and Alhama in Spain.

== International career ==
Coronel represented Argentina in the 2003 FIFA Women's World Cup, the 2007 Pan American Games and the 2008 Summer Olympics. She scored one goal at the 2018 Copa América Femenina.

=== International goals ===
Scores and results list Argentina's goal tally first

No.	Date	Venue	Opponent	Score	Result	Competition
1	12 November 2006	Estadio José María Minella, Mar del Plata, Argentina	Chile	2–0	8–0	2006 South American Women's Football Championship
2	16 April 2018	Estadio La Portada, La Serena, Chile	Colombia	3–1	3–1	2018 Copa América Femenina
