= Elba Vergés =

Spanish footballer (born 1995)

Personal information
- Full name: Elba Vergés Prats (Roser)
- Date of birth: 24 October 1995 (age 31)
- Place of birth: Barcelona, Spain
- Height: 1.70 m (5 ft 7 in)
- Position: Defender

Team information
- Current team: UD Tenerife
- Number: 18

Senior career*
Years	Team	Apps	(Gls)
2011–2013	Barcelona B		
2013–2015	Levante Las Planas	25+	
2015–2017	Espanyol	59	(6)
2017–2018	Soyaux		
2018–2021	Espanyol	70	(2)
2021–2022	Eibar	30	(2)
2022-2023	Alavès	31	(4)
2023-2025	Eibar	59	(3)
2025-	UD Tenerife	34	(3)

International career
2015–2017	Catalonia	3	(0)
- * Club domestic league appearances and goals as of 00:55, 4 October 2022 (UTC)

Elba Vergés Prats (born 24 October 1995) is a Spanish footballer who plays as a defender for UD Tenerife.

== Club career ==
Vergés started her career at Barcelona B.
