= Noelia Aybar =

Spanish footballer (born 1984)

Personal information
- Date of birth: 13 November 1984 (age 41)
- Place of birth: Granada, Spain
- Position: Forward

International career
Years	Team	Apps	(Gls)
- Spain

Noelia Aybar (born 13 November 1984) is a Spanish former footballer who played for Granada CF and the Spain women's national team.
