= Laurina =

Spanish footballer (born 2000)

Personal information
- Full name: Laura Gutiérrez Sáenz de Santa María
- Date of birth: 18 April 2000 (age 26)
- Place of birth: Luanco, Spain
- Position: Midfielder

Team information
- Current team: Deportivo
- Number: 17

Senior career*
Years	Team	Apps	(Gls)
2015–2021	Real Oviedo	60+	(17+)
2021–2923	Real Betis	12	(0)
2023-	Deportivo		
- * Club domestic league appearances and goals as of 19:24, 10 December 2021 (UTC)

Laura Gutiérrez Sáenz de Santa María (born 18 April 2000), known as Laurina, is a Spanish footballer who plays as a midfielder for Deportivo.

== Club career ==
Laurina started her career at Real Oviedo.
