= Joana Flaviano =

Spanish footballer (born 1990)

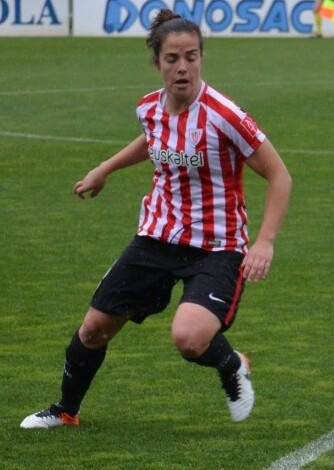
- Flaviano playing for Athletic Club, 2017

Personal information
- Full name: Joana Flaviano Aurtenetxe
- Date of birth: 15 February 1990 (age 36)
- Place of birth: Bilbao, Spain
- Height: 1.66 m (5 ft 5 in)
- Position: Midfielder

Youth career
- 2003–2005: Leioako Emakumeak
- 2003–2005: Athletic Club

Senior career*
Years	Team	Apps	(Gls)
2005–2017	Athletic Club B	41	(20)
2007–2014	Athletic Club	169	(17)
2014–2015	Torres Calcio	15	(2)
2015–2017	Athletic Club	39	(5)
Total		264	(44)

International career
2007–08	Spain U19		
2012	Spain	1	(0)
2017	Basque Country	1	(0)
- * Club domestic league appearances and goals

Joana Flaviano Aurtenetxe (born 15 February 1990) is a Spanish retired footballer who played as a midfielder. She spent the vast majority of her career with Athletic Club, winning the Spanish league title twice (2006–07 and 2015–16). She also had a season at Torres Calcio of the Italian Serie A.

As an Under-19 international she played the 2007 and 2008 U-19 European Championships. She made a 30-minute substitute appearance for the senior national team in a 0–0 home UEFA Women's Euro 2013 qualifying draw with Romania in September 2012.

Flaviano retired from top level football halfway through the 2017–18 season, aged 27, to pursue other career opportunities. In 2021 participated in "El conquistador del Caribe"
