= Estefanía Lima =

Spanish footballer (born 1989)

Estefa
Personal information
- Full name: Estefanía Lima Díaz
- Date of birth: 11 May 1989 (age 37)
- Place of birth: Badajoz, Spain
- Height: 1.74 m (5 ft 9 in)
- Position: Central midfielder

Team information
- Current team: Sport Extremadura

Senior career*
Years	Team	Apps	(Gls)
2007–2008	Sporting Plaza de Argel		
2008–2011	Extremadura FCF		
2011–2021	Santa Teresa	173	(65)
2021–2023	Villarreal	55	(3)
2021–2026	Alhama CF	86	(65)
2026–	Sport Extremadura	0	(8)

International career
2006–2008	Spain U19		
- * Club domestic league appearances and goals as of 21:23, 10 November 2021 (UTC)

Estefanía Lima Díaz (born 11 May 1989), sportingly known as Estefa, is a Spanish footballer who plays as a midfielder for Tercera Federación club Sport Extremadura.
