= Arene Altonaga =

Spanish footballer

Arene
Personal information
- Full name: Arene Altonaga Etxebarria
- Date of birth: 25 February 1993 (age 33)
- Place of birth: Sondika, Spain
- Height: 1.59 m (5 ft 3 in)
- Position: Midfielder

Team information
- Current team: Eibar
- Number: 7

Youth career
- Lauro Ikastola
- 2007–2008: Pauldarrak

Senior career*
Years	Team	Apps	(Gls)
2008–2014	Athletic B	89	(9)
2009–2015	Athletic Bilbao	13	(0)
2015–2017	Oiartzun	46	(5)
2017–2018	Zaragoza	25	(0)
2018–2026	Eibar	147+	(1+)

International career^{‡}
2010	Spain U17	2	(0)
2011	Spain U19	2	(0)
2022–	Basque Country	1	(0)
- * Club domestic league appearances and goals as of 25 July 2025 ‡ National team caps and goals as of 21:08, 16 December 2023 (UTC)

Arene Altonaga Etxebarria (born 25 February 1993) is a Spanish footballer who plays for Eibar as a midfielder.

She began her senior career at Athletic Bilbao and made her Primera División debut one week after her 16th birthday in 2009; however, her progress was stalled by injury and appearances at that level were infrequent – she played mainly for the B team before leaving the club in 2015. She then spent two seasons with Oiartzun and one with Zaragoza (suffering relegation from the top tier with both clubs in successive years) prior to joining Eibar in 2018.

Arene played a minor role in the Eibar squad which gained promotion to the Primera in the 2019–20 season, having suffered a serious injury (rupturing the anterior cruciate ligament of her right knee) at the end of the previous campaign in a Copa Euskal Herria match against her former club Athletic. She had experienced a similar injury as a teenager. At the end of that season an agreement was reached to extend her contract until 2022. Following the departure of Sheila Elorza in 2023, Arene was named as Eibar captain for the club's upcoming campaign back in the top division.

Arene has been selected for the unofficial Basque Country women's national football team which plays only occasionally, making her first appearance in December 2022 against Chile.
