= Martina Capelli =

Italian football coach and former footballer

Personal information
- Date of birth: 19 February 1992 (age 34)
- Place of birth: Parma, Italy
- Height: 1.66 m (5 ft 5 in)
- Position: Midfielder

Senior career*
Years	Team	Apps	(Gls)
2005–2007	Crociati Noceto		
2009–2011	Reggiana	15	(1)
2011–2012	Olimpia Vignola	27	(2)
2013–2014	Herforder		
2014	MSV Duisburg II	17	(1)
2015	RCD Espanyol	11	(0)
2015–2016	Huelva	8	(0)
2016	Como 2000	14	(1)
2016	OSA XS		
2016–2017	Neunkirch	4	(0)
2017–2018	Apollon Limassol		
2018–2020	Milan	5	(0)
- * Club domestic league appearances and goals

Martina Capelli (born 19 February 1992) is an Italian football manager and former player, who played as a midfielder. She was also the manager of Parma women's team.

== Retirement ==
In 2021, Capelli returned to football after retiring, she started to collaborate with Parma's women's team as a sport director.

However, in the next year, she became the coach of Parma woman's team, which was preceded by its promotion to Serie A.
