= Zaira Flores =

Spanish footballer (born 1993)

Personal information
- Full name: Zaira Flores Nogueras
- Date of birth: 4 November 1993 (age 33)
- Place of birth: Sant Joan Despí, Spain
- Position: Midfielder

Senior career*
Years	Team	Apps	(Gls)
2009–2012	Barcelona B		
2010–2013	Barcelona	8	(0)
2013–2015	Levante Las Planas	28+	(1+)
2015–2017	Espanyol	35	(0)
2017–2018	Seagull		
2018–2020	Barcelona B	18+	
2020–2021	Rayo Vallecano	32	(1)
2021–2022	Villarreal	18	(0)
2022–2023	Alhama CF	8	(0)
2023–2024	SD Eibar	37	(0)

International career
2024	Catalonia	1	(0)
- * Club domestic league appearances and goals as of 09:43, 1 May 2022 (UTC)

Zaira Flores Nogueras (born 4 November 1993) is a Spanish former footballer who played as a midfielder until her retirement in July 2024.

== Club career ==
Flores started her career at Barcelona B.
