= Maitane López =

Spanish footballer (born 1995)

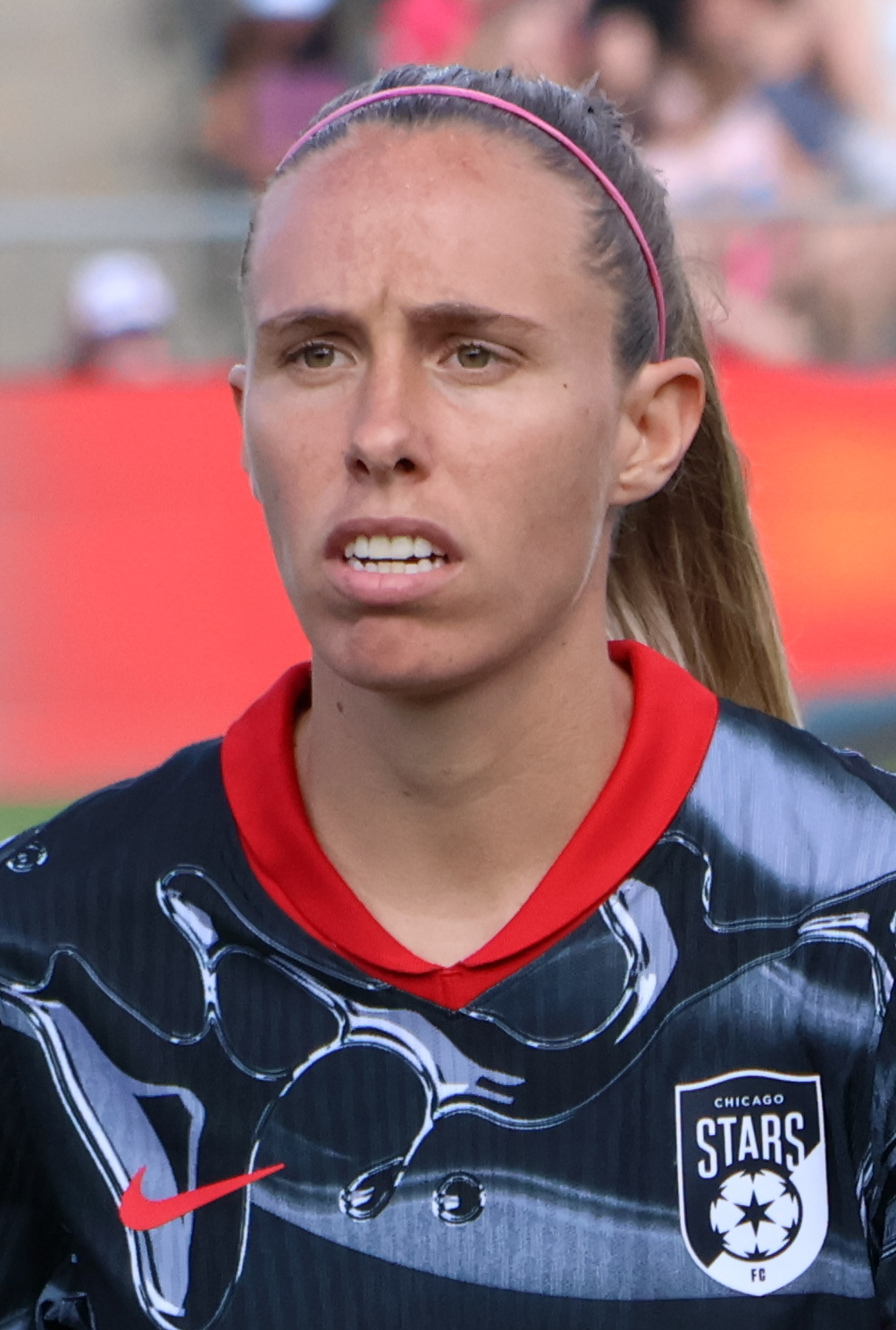
- López with the Chicago Stars in 2025

Personal information
- Full name: Maitane López Millán
- Date of birth: 13 March 1995 (age 31)
- Place of birth: Águilas, Spain
- Height: 1.75 m (5 ft 9 in)
- Positions: Defensive midfielder; centre-back

Team information
- Current team: Chicago Stars
- Number: 77

Senior career*
Years	Team	Apps	(Gls)
2012–2015	Collerense	88	(23)
2015–2020	Levante	123	(9)
2020–2021	Real Sociedad	30	(1)
2021–2023	Atlético Madrid	53	(6)
2023–2024	Gotham FC	21	(1)
2025–	Chicago Stars	45	(0)

International career^{‡}
2010–2012	Spain U17	9	(1)
2014	Spain U19	5	(0)
2021–2022	Spain	2	(0)
- * Club domestic league appearances and goals as of 05:49, 2 November 2026 (UTC) ‡ National team caps and goals as of 12 October 2022

Maitane López Millán (born 13 March 1995) is a Spanish professional footballer who plays as a defensive midfielder or centre-back for Chicago Stars FC of the American National Women's Soccer League and the Spain national team.

== Club career ==
In June 2015, Levante announced the signing of López from Collerense. She would spend five seasons at Levante, after which, she would sign for Real Sociedad. In July 2021, after one year at Real Sociedad, López transferred to Atlético Madrid, where she signed a two-year professional contract.

Before her Atlético expired during the 2023 summer transfer window, López was linked with interest from Women's Super League club Manchester United. However, on 6 July 2023 she signed a two-year contract with an option for an additional year with American club NJ/NY Gotham FC.

On 5 December 2024, Chicago Stars FC announced that they had signed López through the 2026 season.

== International career ==
As a youth international, López was part of the Spain under-17 team that won the 2011 UEFA Women's U-17 Championship, though she did not play much. She then came second with Spain under-19 in the 2014 UEFA Women's U-19 Championship, having consolidated a starting position in the squad after being an injury replacement call-up. Following immediately after that tournament in summer 2014, López played internationally for the Balearic Islands beach football team.

After injuries to Virginia Torrecilla and Amanda Sampedro, López was called up to the Spain national team to face the Czech Republic in October 2019. She did not play in the fixture. Two years later, she made her debut for Spain in a friendly match against Morocco.

== Personal life ==
López is of Basque descent through her father. Two of López's uncles, Aitor and Luis López Rekarte, were professional footballers. Encouraged by Aitor's performances for Real Sociedad, Maitane López signed up for her first football team at the age of five. At that same age, she had moved to Mallorca from Águilas. Outside of football, she sings and plays guitar; she has posted videos on social media of various cover songs that she has performed.
