= Ainize Barea =

Spanish footballer

Peke Barea
Personal information
- Full name: Ainize Barea Nuñez
- Date of birth: 25 January 1992 (age 34)
- Place of birth: Arrigorriaga, Spain
- Height: 1.53 m (5 ft 0 in)
- Position: Forward

Team information
- Current team: Athletic Club
- Number: 22

Senior career*
Years	Team	Apps	(Gls)
2006–2015	Ugao		
2015–2017	Santa Teresa	29	(7)
2017–2021	Deportivo La Coruña	80+	(54+)
2021–2025	Athletic Club	59	(9)
- * Club domestic league appearances and goals as of 15 September 2025

Ainize Barea Nuñez (born 25 January 1992), often known as Peke Barea, is a Spanish former footballer who played as a forward for Athletic Club until her retirement on 15 September 2025.

== Club career ==
Barea started her career at CD Ugao (based in Ugao-Miraballes in southern Biscay). Due to the fact that there were two other footballers with the forename Ainize at the club, Barea was given the nickname 'Peke', a reference to the fact that she was only 153cm tall.

After playing in the regional Basque League with Ugao for eight years, she transferred to Santa Teresa, who were playing in the Primera División, the top tier of Spanish football. Her two seasons at Badajoz-based Santa Teresa were affected negatively by a knee injury and she joined Deportivo La Coruña afterwards, signing a contract with them on 14 June 2017. She would go on to score 84 goals in 106 games for the club.

She remained with Deportivo until July 2021, at which point, she transferred to Athletic Club. In October 2023, it was announced that Barea was pregnant with her first child; she went on maternity leave in March 2024, giving birth in September of that year and returning to the squad in April 2025. As the first active player at the club to be an expectant mother, she observed that information, processes and facilities relating to pregnancy were limited.

== International career ==
Barea earned her first call up for the Spain national team in a UEFA Euro 2022 qualifying match against Moldova in September 2020. She did not play in the match.

== Personal life ==
Until the age of 12, Barea played both football and Basque pelota. Barea remarked that her family were supportive of her career in sports. In 2019, Barea took part in a strike with the aim of improving the salaries paid to women's footballers in Spain. She is a professional footballer as she derives her entire income from the sport.
