= Santa Teresa CD =

Santa Teresa
- Full name: Santa Teresa Club Deportivo
- Founded: 2006; 2013 (merger)
- Dissolved: 2022
- Ground: El Vivero, Badajoz, Extremadura, Spain
- Capacity: 1,500
- 2021–22: Segunda Extremeña – Group 5, retired
- Website: santateresabadajoz.com
Home colours	Away colours	Third colours

Santa Teresa Club Deportivo, formerly Badajoz Club de Fútbol and Deportivo Pacense, was a football club based in Badajoz in the autonomous community of Extremadura, Spain. Founded in 2006 and dissolved in 2022, it last played in Segunda Extremeña – Group 5.

== History ==
Unión Deportiva Badajoz was founded in 2006 and Badajoz CF in the summer of 2012. The current club was founded in summer 2013 after the merger of Badajoz CF, UD Badajoz and CD Puerta Palmas.

In July 2014, the club changed its name to Deportivo Pacense. In July 2017, the club merged with Santa Teresa CD, a women's football club, and changed to the latter name.

UD Badajoz logo

== Season to season ==
- As UD Badajoz

Season	Tier	Division	Place	Copa del Rey
2006–07	6	1ª Reg.	1st	
2007–08	5	Reg. Pref.	2nd	
2008–09	4	3ª	13th	
2009–10	4	3ª	13th	
2010–11	4	3ª	16th	
2011–12	4	3ª	7th	
2012–13	4	3ª	2nd	

- As Badajoz CF

Season	Tier	Division	Place	Copa del Rey
2013–14	4	3ª	4th	

- As Deportivo Pacense

Season	Tier	Division	Place	Copa del Rey
2014–15	4	3ª	17th	
2015–16	4	3ª	20th	
2016–17	5	1ª Ext.	15th	

- As Santa Teresa CD

Season	Tier	Division	Place	Copa del Rey
2017–18	5	1ª Ext.	11th	
2018–19	5	1ª Ext.	20th	
2019–20	6	2ª Ext.	7th	
2020–21	6	2ª Ext.	4th	
2021–22	7	2ª Ext.	(R)	

- 8 seasons in Tercera División

== See also ==
- Santa Teresa CD (women), women's football team
