= Núria Mendoza =

Spanish footballer (born 1995)

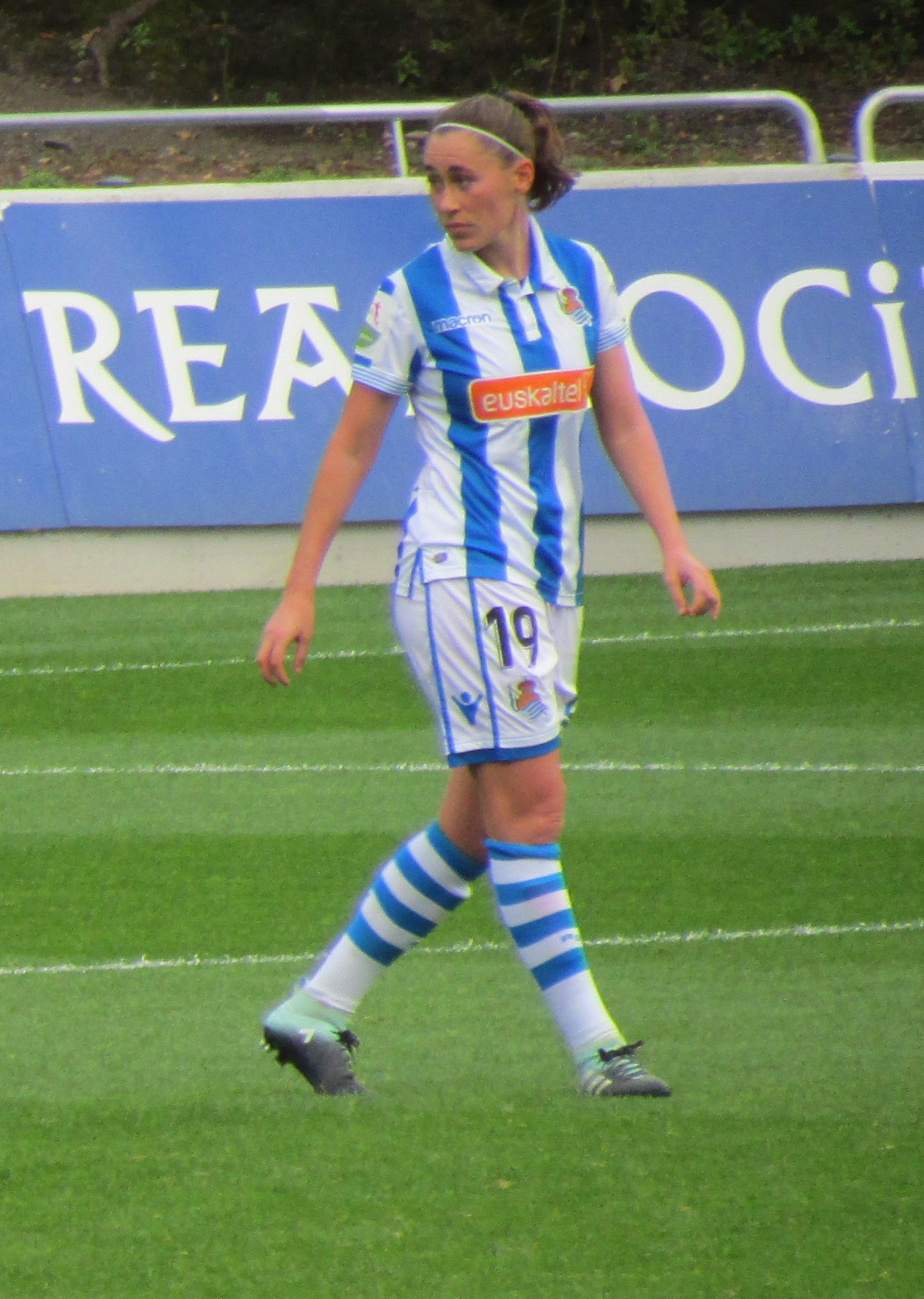

Personal information
- Full name: Núria Mendoza Miralles
- Date of birth: 15 December 1995 (age 30)
- Place of birth: Barcelona, Spain
- Height: 1.69 m (5 ft 7 in)
- Position: Defender

Team information
- Current team: Madrid CFF
- Number: 19

Senior career*
Years	Team	Apps	(Gls)
2010–2012	Espanyol B		
2010–2015	Espanyol	107	(4)
2015–2021	Real Sociedad	166	(7)
2021–2024	Levante	80	(1)
2024–	Madrid CFF	11	(0)

International career
2014–	Catalonia	6	(0)
- * Club domestic league appearances and goals as of 8 December 2024

Núria Mendoza Miralles (born 15 December 1995) is a Spanish footballer who plays as a defender for Madrid CFF.

== Club career ==
Mendoza started her career at Espanyol B. In July 2021, Mendoza transferred to Levante having spent six seasons at Real Sociedad.
