= UD Tenerife =

Spanish women's football club

CD Tenerife Femenino
- Full name: CD Tenerife Femenino
- Founded: 2013; 13 years ago as UD Tenerife
- Stadium: Estadio Heliodoro Rodríguez López
- Capacity: 22,000
- President: Sergio Batista
- Head coach: Yerai Martín
- League: Liga F
- 2025–26: Liga F, 4th
- Website: clubdeportivotenerifefemenino.com
Home colours	Away colours	Third colours

CD Tenerife Femenino or UD Tenerife and previously Unión Deportiva Granadilla Tenerife and Costa Adeje Tenerife, is a Spanish women's football club based on the Tenerife island, in the Canary Islands. The club plays in Liga F, holding home games at the Estadio Heliodoro Rodríguez López.

== History ==
Logo used until 2025

The club was founded in 2013 as UD Granadilla Tenerife Sur and started playing its first season in the second division. It won its group but was finally eliminated in the promotion playoffs by Granada. In its second attempt, the club finished as runner-up of the Canarian group, but qualified for the promotion playoffs as the best second-placed team. Granadilla achieved the promotion to the top tier after eliminating Levante Las Planas and Real Betis.

In its debut in Primera División, Granadilla performed a great season by finishing in the seventh position of the league table and, subsequently, qualifying for the Copa de la Reina, where it was eliminated in the quarterfinals by Valencia.

Logo used until 2018.

In November 2016, the club created a basketball section that made its debut in the 2016–17 Canarian regional league with the name of UD Hotel Médano, for sponsorship reasons. The football team repeated qualification to the Copa de la Reina and reached the semifinals.

In the 2017–18 season, UDG Tenerife made their best performance ever and finished the league in the fourth position and repeated presence in the semifinals of the Cup competition.

In 2023 they relocated from Granadilla de Abona to nearby Adeje. Both municipalities are in the south of the island, but the club plays landmark matches at the Estadio Heliodoro Rodríguez López in Santa Cruz de Tenerife.

In June 2025, it became the women’s section of Canary Islands football club Club Deportivo Tenerife, gaining the right to use Estadio Heliodoro Rodríguez López for major matches.

== Season by season ==
Season	Div.	Pos.	Copa de la Reina
2013–14	2ª	1st	
2014–15	2ª	2nd	
2015–16	1ª	7th	Quarterfinalist
2016–17	1ª	6th	Semifinalist
2017–18	1ª	4th	Semifinalist
2018–19	1ª	4th	Round of 16
2019–20	1ª	9th	Round of 16
2020–21	1ª	6th	Quarterfinalist
2021–22	1ª	5th	Semifinalist
2022–23	1ª	6th	Round of 16
2023–24	1ª	9th	Quarterfinalist
2024–25	1ª	6th	Round of 16
2025–26	1ª	4th	Semifinalist

== Players ==
=== Current squad ===
As of 2 July 2026.

Note: Flags indicate national team as defined under FIFA eligibility rules; some limited exceptions apply. Players may hold more than one non-FIFA nationality.

No.	Pos.	Nation	Player
1	GK	ESP	Noelia Ramos
2	FW	CIV	Ange N'Guessan
3	DF	ESP	Cinta Rodríguez
4	DF	MLI	Fatou Dembele
5	MF	VEN	Yerliane Moreno
6	MF	ESP	Paola Hernández
8	DF	ESP	Violeta Quiles
9	FW	ESP	Ariana Arias
10	FW	ESP	Carlota Suárez
11	FW	POL	Aleksandra Zaremba
13	GK	VEN	Nay Cáceres

No.	Pos.	Nation	Player
14	DF	ESP	Natalia Ramos
17	FW	ESP	María José Pérez
18	DF	ESP	Elba Vergés
19	FW	ESP	Iratxe Pérez
21	DF	ESP	Aithiara Carballo
22	DF	ESP	Patri Gavira
23	DF	ESP	Pisco
24	FW	ARG	Paulina Gramaglia
28	DF	ESP	Jenni López
31	FW	CIV	Marie Gossé
—	MF	VEN	Bárbara Martínez Flores
—	MF	ESP	Ari Mingueza
—	FW	POL	Natalia Padilla
—	FW	ESP	Marina Martí
—	DF	ESP	Alba Pérez

=== Reserve team ===
Note: Flags indicate national team as defined under FIFA eligibility rules; some limited exceptions apply. Players may hold more than one non-FIFA nationality.

No.	Pos.	Nation	Player
26	GK	ARG	Ariana Álvarez
27	FW	ESP	Ainhoa Delgado

No.	Pos.	Nation	Player
29	DF	ESP	Nekane Morales
33	MF	VEN	Bárbara Martínez
