= 2017–18 Primera División (women) =

Primera División
- Season: 2017–18
- Champions: Atlético de Madrid (2nd title)
- Relegated: Zaragoza CFF; Santa Teresa
- Champions League: Atlético de Madrid; Barcelona
- Matches: 240
- Goals: 709 (2.95 per match)
- Top goalscorer: Charlyn Corral (24 goals)
- Biggest home win: Barcelona 10–0 Santa Teresa
- Biggest away win: Zaragoza CFF 0–9 Barcelona
- Highest scoring: Barcelona 10–0 Santa Teresa; Sevilla 5–5 Levante
- Longest winning run: Atlético de Madrid and Barcelona (7)
- Longest unbeaten run: Atlético de Madrid (17)
- Longest losing run: Fundación Albacete (8)
- Highest attendance: 22,202; Atlético de Madrid 2–2 Madrid CFF (17 March 2018)

The 2017–18 Primera División Femenina de Fútbol was the 30th edition of Spain's highest women's football league. The season started on 3 September 2017 and ended on 13 May 2018.

Defending champions Atlético de Madrid successfully retained their title.

== Teams ==
Location of the 2017–18 Primera División teams
Canary Islands location of the 2017–18 Primera División teams

Madrid CFF and Sevilla joined the league after earning promotion at the conclusion of the 2016–17 Segunda División. They took the place of Oiartzun and Tacuense, which were relegated at the conclusion of the 2016–17 Primera División.

=== Stadia and locations ===
Team	Home city	Stadium
Athletic Club	(Basque Country (autonomous community)) Bilbao	Lezama
Atlético de Madrid	(Community of Madrid) Madrid	Cerro del Espino
Barcelona	(Catalonia) Barcelona	Joan Gamper
Espanyol	(Catalonia) Barcelona	Dani Jarque
Fundación Albacete	(Castilla–La Mancha) Albacete	Andrés Iniesta
Granadilla	(Canary Islands) Granadilla de Abona	Francisco Suárez
Levante	(Valencian Community) Valencia	El Terrer
Madrid CFF	(Community of Madrid) San Sebastián de los Reyes	Nuevo Matapiñonera
Rayo Vallecano	(Community of Madrid) Madrid	Ciudad Deportiva
Betis	(Andalusia) Seville	Luis del Sol
Real Sociedad	(Basque Country (autonomous community)) San Sebastián	Zubieta
Santa Teresa	(Extremadura) Badajoz	El Vivero
Sevilla	(Andalusia) Seville	Viejo Nervión
Sporting de Huelva	(Andalusia) Huelva	El Conquero
Valencia	(Valencian Community) Valencia	Antonio Puchades
Zaragoza CFF	(Aragon) Zaragoza CFF	Pedro Sancho

=== Personnel and sponsorship ===
Team	Head coach	Captain	Kit manufacturer	Main shirt sponsor
Athletic Club	Joseba Agirre	Iraia Iturregi	New Balance	Kutxabank
Atlético de Madrid	Ángel Villacampa	Amanda Sampedro	Nike	Herbalife
Barcelona	Fran Sánchez	Laura Ràfols	Nike	
Betis	María del Mar Fernández	Irene Guerrero	Adidas	
Espanyol	Joan Bacardit	Paloma Fernández	Joma	Ilumax
Fundación Albacete	Carlos del Valle	Matilde Martínez	Hummel	Nexus
Granadilla	Antonio Ayala	Cindy García	Mercury	Egatesa
Levante	Andrés Tudela	Sonia Prim	Nike	East United
Madrid CFF	Víctor Miguel Fernández	Paola Ulloa	Nike	
Rayo Vallecano	Miguel Ángel Quejigo	Alicia Gómez	Kelme	
Real Sociedad	Gonzalo Arconada	Aintzane Encinas	Adidas	S21sec
Santa Teresa	Juan Carlos Antúnez	Estefanía Lima	Luanvi	Clínica Extremeña
Sevilla	Francisco José García	Alicia Fuentes	New Balance	Playtika
Sporting de Huelva	Antonio Toledo	Anita Hernández	Mercury	Cajasol
Valencia	Jesús Oliva	Ivana Andrés	Adidas	Mr Jeff
Zaragoza CFF	José Manuel Perna	Nuria Mallada	Hummel	Aragón

=== Managerial changes ===
Team	Outgoing manager	Manner of departure	Date of vacancy	Position in table	Incoming manager	Date of appointment
Valencia	Cristian Toro	End of contract	30 June 2017	Pre-season	Jesús Oliva	19 May 2017
Real Sociedad	Igor San Miguel	End of contract	30 June 2017	Pre-season	Juan José Arregi	25 May 2017
Barcelona	Xavi Llorens	End of contract	30 June 2017	Pre-season	Fran Sánchez	1 June 2017
Fundación Albacete	Milagros Martínez	Interim	30 June 2017	Pre-season	Carlos del Valle	16 June 2017
Sevilla	Maribel Márquez	Sacked	20 June 2017	Pre-season	Francisco José García	20 June 2017
Espanyol	Rubén Rodríguez	End of contract	30 June 2017	Pre-season	Joan Bacardit	26 June 2017
Real Sociedad	Juan José Arregi	Sacked	21 November 2017	15th	Gonzalo Arconada	21 November 2017
Madrid CFF	Jesús Nuñez	Sacked	12 December 2017	14th	Víctor Martín	12 December 2017
Madrid CFF	Víctor Martín	Caretaker	31 December 2017	13th	Víctor Miguel Fernández	2 January 2018
Levante	Andrés Tudela	Sacked	14 February 2018	7th	Joaquín García	14 February 2018
Zaragoza CFF	Alberto Berna	Sacked	27 April 2018	17th	José Manuel Perna	27 April 2018

== League table ==
Pos	Team	Pld	W	D	L	GF	GA	GD	Pts	Qualification or relegation
1	Atlético de Madrid (C)	30	24	5	1	74	21	+53	77	Qualification for the UEFA Champions League and Copa de la Reina
2	Barcelona	30	24	4	2	98	12	+86	76	Qualification for the UEFA Champions League and Copa de la Reina
3	Athletic Club	30	18	2	10	51	41	+10	56	Qualification for the Copa de la Reina
4	Granadilla	30	16	6	8	48	33	+15	54	Qualification for the Copa de la Reina
5	Valencia	30	14	8	8	49	32	+17	50	Qualification for the Copa de la Reina
6	Betis	30	14	4	12	40	37	+3	46	Qualification for the Copa de la Reina
7	Real Sociedad	30	10	8	12	42	37	+5	38 (Note: Levante 1–1 1–2 Real Sociedad; Sporting de Huelva 0–1 1–2 Levante)	Qualification for the Copa de la Reina
8	Levante	30	11	5	14	49	50	−1	38	Qualification for the Copa de la Reina
9	Sporting de Huelva	30	11	5	14	35	42	−7	38	
10	Madrid CFF	30	10	6	14	34	56	−22	36	
11	Rayo Vallecano	30	9	6	15	39	63	−24	33	
12	Sevilla	30	8	7	15	35	50	−15	31	
13	Fundación Albacete	30	8	6	16	42	58	−16	30	
14	Espanyol	30	7	8	15	22	42	−20	29	
15	Zaragoza CFF (R)	30	6	5	19	31	67	−36	23	Relegation to the Segunda División
16	Santa Teresa (R)	30	4	7	19	20	68	−48	19	Relegation to the Segunda División

Source: La Liga, Soccerway
Rules for classification: 1) points; 2) head-to-head points; 3) goal difference; 4) number of goals scored
(C) Champions; (R) Relegated

== Results ==
Home \ Away	ATH	ATM	BAR	ESP	ALB	GRA	LEV	MAD	RAY	BET	RSO	STE	SEV	SPH	VAL	ZAR
Athletic Club	—	2–2	1–2	1–0	2–0	0–1	1–0	2–3	3–1	1–0	2–1	1–0	2–1	2–0	3–2	4–0
Atlético de Madrid	6–0	—	1–1	2–0	4–3	2–0	1–0	2–2	0–1	1–0	1–0	2–1	2–0	3–1	1–0	3–0
Barcelona	0–1	1–1	—	7–0	3–0	3–1	5–0	7–0	7–0	6–1	0–0	10–0	5–0	3–0	2–0	2–0
Espanyol	0–2	0–1	1–3	—	1–2	0–3	0–6	1–2	0–1	1–0	0–0	3–0	1–0	1–0	0–0	2–1
Fundación Albacete	1–3	1–3	0–3	1–3	—	2–2	1–0	1–1	3–1	4–1	0–3	4–0	1–1	0–3	0–2	3–0
Granadilla	4–1	0–4	1–0	1–0	0–5	—	1–2	2–0	3–1	2–3	0–2	5–1	2–0	5–1	0–0	2–0
Levante	3–2	0–4	0–5	1–1	4–2	0–1	—	1–1	2–3	0–1	1–1	3–0	1–1	2–1	0–1	5–1
Madrid CFF	0–1	0–3	1–2	1–1	1–0	1–3	2–1	—	2–0	0–1	2–1	2–1	0–2	2–1	2–1	3–2
Rayo Vallecano	2–2	1–4	1–2	1–1	2–2	1–1	0–4	3–2	—	1–3	2–3	3–0	1–1	3–1	4–2	1–1
Betis	1–2	2–4	0–2	2–0	4–0	0–1	2–0	2–1	1–2	—	4–0	3–0	1–0	0–1	0–0	1–0
Real Sociedad	1–4	1–1	0–1	1–1	2–2	1–2	2–1	3–0	3–0	1–1	—	3–0	0–1	0–1	0–1	6–2
Santa Teresa	1–2	0–3	0–3	0–0	1–0	0–3	0–3	1–1	2–0	1–2	1–4	—	1–1	1–1	1–1	3–1
Sevilla	3–2	1–2	0–2	1–3	3–3	1–0	5–5	3–1	1–0	0–1	0–2	1–2	—	1–2	1–3	3–2
Sporting de Huelva	1–0	2–4	1–1	2–0	2–0	1–1	0–1	3–0	3–1	0–0	1–3	1–0	2–1	—	1–3	1–1
Valencia	3–1	0–1	1–4	1–1	3–0	0–0	2–3	4–0	4–1	5–2	3–1	1–1	1–1	1–0	—	1–0
Zaragoza CFF	2–1	1–6	0–9	2–0	0–1	1–1	3–0	1–1	0–1	1–1	2–0	4–1	0–1	2–1	1–3	—

Updated to match(es) played on 13 May 2018. Source: LaLiga.es
Legend: Blue = home team win; Yellow = draw; Red = away team win.

== Season statistics ==
As of 13 May 2018

=== Top goalscorers ===
Rank	Player	Club	Goals
1	(Mexico) Charlyn Corral	Levante	24
2	(Spain) Sonia Bermúdez	Atlético de Madrid	19
2	(Spain) Mari Paz Vilas	Valencia	19
4	(Spain) Nahikari García	Real Sociedad	16
4	(Spain) Alba Redondo	Fundación Albacete	16
6	(Spain) Natalia Pablos	Rayo Vallecano	15
7	(Spain) Nekane Díez	Athletic Club	13
7	(Spain) Erika Vázquez	Athletic Club	13
9	(Brazil) Andressa Alves	Barcelona	12
9	(Spain) María José Pérez	Granadilla	12
11	(England) Toni Duggan	Barcelona	11
11	(Netherlands) Lieke Martens	Barcelona	11
11	(Spain) Alexia Putellas	Barcelona	11
11	(Spain) Miriam Rodríguez	Fundación Albacete	11
11	(Brazil) Ludmila da Silva	Atlético de Madrid	11
16	(Equatorial Guinea) Jade Boho	Madrid CFF	10
16	(Spain) Yulema Corres	Athletic Club	10
16	(Spain) Anita Hernández	Sporting de Huelva	10
16	(Spain) Bárbara Latorre	Barcelona	10
16	(Spain) Estefanía Lima	Santa Teresa	10
16	(Spain) Jennifer Morilla	Sevilla	10

=== Hat-tricks ===
Player	For	Against	Result	Round
Bárbara Latorre^{4}	Barcelona	Madrid CFF	7–0 (h)	9
Nahikari García^{5}	Real Sociedad	Zaragoza CFF	6–2 (h)	11
Charlyn Corral	Levante	Athletic Club	3–2 (h)	12
Mari Paz Vilas	Valencia	Real Sociedad	3–1 (h)	16
Charlyn Corral^{4}	Levante	Espanyol	6–2 (a)	20
Mari Paz Vilas	Valencia	Rayo Vallecano	4–1 (h)	27
Nahikari García	Real Sociedad	Santa Teresa	1–4 (a)	29

^{4} Player scored 4 goals
^{5} Player scored 5 goals

=== Best goalkeepers ===
Rank	Player	Club	Goals against	Matches	Coeff.
1	(Spain) Sandra Paños	Barcelona	12	26	0.46
2	(Spain) Dolores Gallardo	Atlético de Madrid	15	25	0.6
3	(Spain) Pili González	Granadilla	27	25	1.08
4	(Netherlands) Jennifer Vreugdenhil	Valencia	31	28	1.11
5	(Spain) María Asunción Quiñones	Real Sociedad	29	26	1.12
6	(Spain) Miriam López	Betis	23	19	1.21

=== Player of the week ===
Week	Player of the Week	Club	Week's Statline
Week 1	Charlyn Corral	Levante	1G (vs Madrid CFF)
Week 2	Alba Mellado	Madrid CFF	1G (vs Zaragoza CFF)
Week 3	Yulema Corres	Athletic Club	2G (vs Valencia)
Week 4	Jade Boho	Madrid CFF	2G (vs Real Sociedad)
Week 5	Martina Piemonte	Sevilla	1G (vs Zaragoza CFF)
Week 6	Elisa del Estal	Espanyol	2G (vs Zaragoza CFF)
Week 7	Pili	Granadilla	CS (vs Athletic Club)
Week 8	Ángela Sosa	Atlético de Madrid	
Week 9	Nadezhda Kárpova	Valencia	2G (vs Betis)
Week 10	Jackie Simpson	Granadilla	1G (vs Barcelona)
Week 11	Bárbara Latorre	Barcelona	2G (vs Betis)
Week 12	Charlyn Corral	Levante	3G (vs Athletic Club)
Week 13	Alicia Gómez	Rayo Vallecano	CS (vs Atlético de Madrid)
Week 14	Alexandra López	Madrid CFF	1G (vs Espanyol)
Week 15	Rocío Gálvez	Betis	1G (vs Sevilla)
Week 16	Koko	Granadilla	1G (vs Rayo Vallcano)
Week 17	María José	Granadilla	1G (vs Levante)
Week 18	Cristina Baudet	Espanyol	1G (vs Sporting de Huelva)
Week 19	Zenatha Coleman	Zaragoza CFF	1G (vs Betis)
Week 20	Charlyn Corral	Levante	4G (vs Espanyol)
Week 21	Saray García	Madrid CFF	2G (vs Athletic Club)
Week 22	María Estella	Granadilla	1G (vs Athletic Club)
Week 23	Jade Boho	Madrid CFF	2G (vs Atlético de Madrid)
Week 24	Amanda Sampedro	Atlético de Madrid	1G (vs Granadilla)
Week 25	Antia Hernández	Sporting de Huelva	2G (vs Madrid CFF)
Week 25	Charlyn Corral	Levante	3G (vs Santa Teresa)
Week 27	Paula Moreno	Betis	1G (vs Madrid CFF)
Week 28	Antia Hernández	Sporting de Huelva	1G (vs Real Sociedad)
Week 29	Cristina Martín-Prieto	Granadilla	1G (vs Sevilla)
Week 30	Rosita Márquez	Betis	1A (vs Sevilla)

=== Notable attendances ===
- 22,202 Atlético de Madrid 2–2 Madrid CFF (17 March 2018 at Wanda Metropolitano)
- 21,504 Real Sociedad 1–4 Athletic Club (13 May 2018 at Anoeta Stadium)
- 14,000 Levante 0–1 Valencia (28 April 2018 at Ciutat de València)
- 6,643 Betis 3–0 Santa Teresa (10 March 2018 at Benito Villamarín)

== Transfers ==
Team	In	Out
Athletic Club	Ane Bergara (FC Barcelona) DF; María Díaz Cirauqui (Real Sociedad) MF	Jone Guarrotxena (??) GK; Elixabet Ibarra (retired) MF; Iraia Iturregi (retired) MF; Maite Lizaso (??) MF; Estibaliz Bajo (Oiartzun KE) FW; Irune Murua (retired) FW
Atlético de Madrid	Laia Aleixandri (FC Barcelona "B") DF (Brazil) Jucinara (SC Corinthians) DF (Switzerland) Viola Calligaris (BSC Young Boys) MF (France) Aurélie Kaci (Olympique Lyonnais) MF (Morocco) Sana Daoudi (Paris Saint-Germain) MF; Carla Bautista (Fundación Albacete) FW (Brazil) Ludmila da Silva (São José EC) FW	Beatriz Beltrán (Real Sociedad) DF; Rocío Gálvez (Betis) DF; María Pilar León (FC Barcelona) DF; Alexandra López (Madrid CFF) DF; Ainoa Campo (Madrid CFF) MF; Pilar García (Rayo Vallecano) MF (Equatorial Guinea) Genoveva Añonma (Maccabi Hadera FC) FW; Priscila Borja (Betis) FW
FC Barcelona	Fran Sánchez (unattached) HC; María Pilar León (Atlético de Madrid) DF (Brazil) Fabiana Simões (SC Corinthians) DF (France) Élise Bussaglia (VfL Wolfsburg) MF (Netherlands) Lieke Martens (FC Rosengård) MF (North Macedonia) Nataša Andonova (Paris Saint-Germain) FW (England) Toni Duggan (Manchester City) FW	Xavi Llorens (??) HC; Ane Bergara (Athletic Club) DF; Leire Landa (retired) DF; Miriam Diéguez (Levante UD) MF; Sandra Hernández (Valencia CF) MF; Irene del Río (retired) MF; Jennifer Hermoso (Paris Saint-Germain) FW (Ivory Coast) Koko Ange N'Guessan (UD Granadilla TS) FW
Betis	Rocío Gálvez (Atlético de Madrid) DF; Maddi Torre (Santa Teresa CD) DF; Virginia García (UD Granadilla TS) MF; Priscila Borja (Atlético de Madrid) FW	María Suárez (retired) DF; Miriam Rodríguez "Kuki" (Fundación Albacete) FW
RCD Espanyol	María José Pons (Zaragoza CFF) GK; Berta Pujadas (FC Barcelona "B") DF (Slovenia) Dominika Čonč (Fortuna Hjørring) MF; Clara Martínez (Zaragoza CFF) MF (Japan) Ayaki Shinada (NGU Loveledge Nagoya) MF; Maria Benedicto (FC Barcelona "B") FW (Finland) Riikka Hannula (ASD Fimauto Valpolicella) FW (Italy) Deborah Salvatori Rinaldi (Fiorentina) FW	Norma Méndez (Sant Cugat FC) GK; Helena Serrano (??) DF; Elba Vergés (ASJ Soyaux) DF; Sara del Estal (RCDeportivo) MF; Vanessa Obis (CE Sant Gabriel) MF; Zaira Flores (CE Seagull) MF; Anair Lomba (Valencia CF) FW; Alba Pomares (Fundación Albacete) FW; Gemma Sala (??) FW
Fundación Albacete	Andrea Rios (Atlético de Madrid "B") GK; Zulema Díaz (Joventut Almassora CF) DF; Claudia Florentino (Valencia CF "B") DF; Noelia Villegas (Atlético de Madrid "B") DF; Paula Arnal (UD Aldaia CF) MF; Vanessa Lorca (CFF Albacete) MF; Alba Pomares (RCD Espanyol) FW; Miriam Rodríguez "Kuki" (Betis) FW (Cameroon) Gabrielle Ngaska (ADyC Pinto) FW	María Sanjuan (UD Aldaia CF) GK; Patricia Padilla (Levante UD) DF; Marisa Martín (EMF Fuensalida) MF; Irene Ojeda "Mushu" (Granada CF) MF; Carla Bautista (Atlético de Madrid) FW; Alicia Muñoz (Santa Teresa CD) FW; Macarena Portales (Zaragoza CFF) FW
UD Granadilla Tenerife Sur	María del Pilar González (UD Tacuense) GK (United States) Megan Crosson (Houston Dash) DF; Andrea Marrero (UD Tacuense) DF (Canada) Jordyn Listro (South Florida Bulls) MF; Cristina Martín-Prieto (Sporting de Huelva) FW (Ivory Coast) Koko Ange N'Guessan (FC Barcelona) FW; María José Pérez (Levante UD) FW	Noelia Ramos (Levante UD) GK; Natalia Ramos (Levante UD) DF; Virginia García (Betis) MF (Brazil) Luana Spindler (Grêmio FBPA) FW
Levante UD	Noelia Ramos (Levante UD) GK (Mexico) Greta Espinoza (Oregon State Beavers) DF; Natalia Ramos (Levante UD) DF; Patricia Padilla (Fundación Albacete) DF; Alba Aznar (Levante UD) MF; Marta Cardona (Levante UD) MF; Miriam Diéguez (FC Barcelona) MF (Denmark) Sofie Junge Pedersen (FC Rosengård) MF (Portugal) Jéssica Silva (SC Braga) FW	(Costa Rica) Noelia Bermúdez (Valencia CF) GK (Romania) Olivia Oprea (Sevilla FC) DF (Portugal) Raquel Infante (Rodez AF) DF; María José Rocafull (UD Aldaia CF) DF; Patricia Padilla (Fundación Albacete) DF; Nagore Calderón (Sevilla FC) MF; Andrea Esteban (Valencia CF) MF; Alba Merino (Santa Teresa CD) MF; Sheila Guijarro (Málaga CF) FW; Adriana Martín (Málaga CF) FW; María José Pérez (UD Granadilla TS) FW; María Isabel Ortega (Sporting Plaza de Argel) FW
Madrid CFF	Ona Batlle (FC Barcelona "B") DF; Alexandra López (Atlético de Madrid) DF; Ainoa Campo (Atlético de Madrid) MF; Paula Serrano (FC Neunkirch) MF (Switzerland) Sandy Mändly (FC Neunkirch) FW; Laura del Río (CD Tacón) FW	Marta Carro (Valencia CF) DF; Laura Duque (Dinamo Guadalajara) FW
Rayo Vallecano	Pilar García (Atlético de Madrid) MF; Nieves Ibáñez (Levante UD "B") MF; Ángeles del Álamo (Vallecas CF) FW	
Real Sociedad	Juan José Arregi (Basque Country women) HC; Beatriz Beltrán (Atlético de Madrid) DF; Claudia Zornoza (Valencia CF) MF (Japan) Michi Goto (CD Mariño) FW	Igor San Miguel (??) HC; Nuria Sánchez "Mulán" (Leeds United) DF; María Díaz Cirauqui (Athletic Club) MF; Aintzane Encinas (retired) FW; Maialen Zelaia (??) FW
Santa Teresa CD	Yolanda Aguirre (FF La Solana) GK; Patricia Larqué (Zaragoza CFF) GK (Cameroon) Augustine Ejangue (Fortuna Hjørring) DF; Alba Gordillo (Oviedo Moderno CF) DF; Marta Reyes (Zaragoza CFF) DF; Ariadna Rovirola (FC Barcelona "B") DF; Alba Merino (Levante UD) MF; Carla Gómez (Zaragoza CFF) FW; Alicia Muñoz (Fundación Albacete) FW	(France) Émmeline Mainguy (Dijon FCO) GK; Beatriz Orellana (retired) GK (Brazil) Sandra Figueiredo (??) DF; Maddi Torre (Betis) DF (Brazil) Vânia Cristina Martins (retired) MF (Finland) Ria Öling (TPS Turku) MF; Ainize Barea (RC Deportivo) FW
Sevilla FC	Francisco José García (AD Nervión, male junior) HC; Maite Albarrán (Sporting de Huelva) DF; María Bores (Atlético de Madrid) DF (Romania) Olivia Oprea (Levante UD) DF; Nagore Calderón (Levante UD) MF (Italy) Martina Piemonte (AGSM Verona) FW; Helena Torres (Elche CF) FW	Maribel Márquez (??) HC
Sporting de Huelva	(Slovenia) Eva Vamberger (Olimpija Ljubljana) GK; Sandra García (Sporting Plaza de Argel) DF; Patricia Ojeda (UD Tacuense) DF (Austria) Katharina Aufhauser (SV Neulengbach) MF; Sofía Hartard (Club Universidad de Chile) MF; Francisca Lara (Colo-Colo) MF (Cameroon) Genevieve Ngo (FC Minsk) MF; Bárbara Santibáñez (Club Universidad de Chile) MF; Carol González (Oiartzun KE) FW	(Brazil) Thaís Picarte (Santos FC) GK; Maite Albarrán (Sevilla FC) DF; Silvia Mérida (RC Deportivo) DF; Jennifer Benítez (retired) MF (Mexico) Nayeli Rangel (Tigres UANL) MF (Finland) Jenny Danielsson (Åland United) MF; Gabriela Gutiérrez (UD Collerense) FW; Cristina Martín-Prieto (UD Granadilla TS) FW (Romania) Laura Rus (Apollon Ladies F.C.) FW
Valencia CF	Jesús Oliva (Valencia CF, assistant coach) HC (Costa Rica) Noelia Bermúdez (Levante UD) GK (Netherlands) Jennifer Vreugdenhil (ADO Den Haag) GK (Netherlands) Mandy van den Berg (Reading) DF; Marta Carro (Madrid CFF) DF; Andrea Esteban (Levante UD) MF; Sandra Hernández (FC Barcelona) MF; Anair Lomba (RCD Espanyol) FW	(Argentina) Cristian Toro (??) HC (Chile) Christiane Endler (Paris Saint-Germain) GK; Esther Sullastres (Zaragoza CFF) GK; Sara Micó (Sporting Plaza de Argel) DF; Esther Romero (retired) DF (Chile) Yanara Aedo (Washington Spirit) MF (Japan) Maya Yamamoto (Zaragoza CFF) MF; Claudia Zornoza (Real Sociedad) MF (Argentina) Estefanía Banini (Washington Spirit) FW
Zaragoza CFF	Oihana Aldai (Oiartzun KE) GK; Esther Sullastres (Valencia CF) GK; Arene Altonaga (Oiartzun KE) MF; Ainhoa López (AEM Lleida) MF (United States) Denali Murnan (FC Ramat HaSharon) MF (Japan) Maya Yamamoto (Valencia CF) MF; Macarena Portales (Fundación Albacete) FW (England) Chloe Richards (Heat FC) FW	Patricia Larqué (Santa Teresa CD) GK; María José Pons (RCD Espanyol) GK; Marta Reyes (Santa Teresa CD) DF; Alba Aznar (Levante UD) MF; Marta Cardona (Levante UD) MF; Clara Martínez (RCD Espanyol) MF; Carla Gómez (Santa Teresa CD) FW (Paraguay) Gloria Villamayor (Colo-Colo) FW
