= 2025–26 Copa de la Reina de Fútbol =

2025–2026 Copa de la Reina de Fútbol
Campeonato de España Copa de Su Majestad la Reina

Tournament details
- Country: Spain
- Teams: 48

Final positions
- Champions: Barcelona (12th title)
- Runners-up: Atlético Madrid

Tournament statistics
- Matches played: 49
- Goals scored: 175 (3.57 per match)
- Top goal scorer: Alba Navarro (5) Guiniguada Apolinario

The 2025–26 Copa de la Reina de Fútbol is the 44th edition of the Spanish women's association football national cup organized by the Royal Spanish Football Federation (RFEF).

Barcelona are the defending champions.

== Schedule and format ==
All ties, except the semi-finals, are played in a single-match decider at the home ground of the lower division opponent. All matches ending in a tie will be decided in extra time; and by a penalty shootout if there's still a tie. The final is set to be played at Gran Canaria Stadium, in Las Palmas.

Round	Draw date	Match date	Fixtures	Clubs	Format details
First round	20 August 2025	10–11 September 2025	16	32 → 16	Knock-out tournament type: Single match.
Second round	15 September 2025	30 September – 1 October 2025	8	16 → 8	Knock-out tournament type: Single match.
Third round	6 October 2025	4–6 November 2025	8	16 → 8	Knock-out tournament type: Single match.
Round of 16	11 November 2025	19–21 December 2025	8	16 → 8	Knock-out tournament type: Single match.
Quarter-finals	7 January 2026	4–5 February 2026	4	8 → 4	Knock-out tournament type: Single match.
Semi-finals	6 February 2026	11–12 March 2026	2	4 → 2	Knock-out tournament type: Double match.
Semi-finals	6 February 2026	17–18 March 2026	2	4 → 2	Knock-out tournament type: Double match.
Final	6 February 2026	16 May 2026	1	2 → 1	Single match.

== First round ==
=== Draw ===
The draw was completed by the RFEF on 20 August 2025, at the Ciudad del Fútbol de Las Rozas in Madrid. The games were played on the 10 and 11 of September 2025.

=== Matches ===
10 September 2025	Balears	0–2	SE AEM	Palma de Mallorca
17:00 CEST (UTC+2)		Report	Amaya 60'; Noguera 80' (o.g.)	Stadium: Campo de Son Malferit; Referee: Sonia Valenzuela Chaouqi

10 September 2025	Córdoba	1–4	Sporting de Huelva	Córdoba
18:00 CEST (UTC+2)	Muñoz 28'	Report	Lemes 40'; Morán 59'; López 82'; Pescatore 90'	Stadium: Ciudad deportiva Rafael Gómez; Referee: Génesis Suárez Medina

10 September 2025	Bizkerre	0–5	Alavés	Getxo
18:00 CEST (UTC+2)		Report	Gil 13', 18', 45+1'; León 65'; Arriola 90'	Stadium: Campo Bolue; Referee: Lidia Barragán

10 September 2025	Atlético Villalonga	0–6	Real Oviedo	Villalonga
18:15 CEST (UTC+2)		Report	de Teresa 28', 59'; Laurina 38'; Garrido 45+1'; Menéndez 71'; Sordo 88'	Stadium: Novo San Pedro; Referee: Uxia Boimorto Blanco

10 September 2025	Pradejón	0–4	Racing Santander	Pradejón
18:30 CEST (UTC+2)		Report	Baron 8'; Ruiz 42'; García 83'; Rabasco 88'	Stadium: Campo Municipal de Pradejón; Referee: Izaskun Muñoz Echeverría

10 September 2025	Sporting de Gijón	0–0 (a.e.t.) (4–3 p)	Real Avilés	Gijón
18:30 CEST (UTC+2)				Stadium: Escuela de Fútbol de Mareo; Referee: Nerea Delgado Perez
	Penalties
	Cueto (penalty scored); Andreu (penalty missed); Amores (penalty scored); Avila (penalty scored); Roca (penalty scored)		Iglesias (penalty scored); González (penalty missed); Neira (penalty scored); Menendez (penalty scored); Navarro (penalty missed)

10 September 2025	Elche	0–2	Valencia	Elche
18:30 CEST (UTC+2)		Report	Recio 58'; Ferrato 85'	Stadium: Campo de Fútbol Diego Quiles; Referee: Raquel Ortiz García

10 September 2025	Málaga	2–0 (a.e.t.)	Real Betis	Málaga
19:00 CEST (UTC+2)	Herrera 112'; Alicia 114'	Report		Stadium: Ciudad Deportiva de El Viso; Referee: Claudia Sofía Molino Ruiz

10 September 2025	Sport Extremadura	1–0	Cacereño	Badajoz
19:30 CEST (UTC+2)	Bareiro 90+2'	Report		Stadium: Instalaciones Deportivas Municipales El Vivero; Referee: Gema Carrasco Gómez

10 September 2025	Juan Grande	0–3	Femarguín Gran Canaria	Castillo del Romeral
20:00 CEST (UTC+1)		Report	Marta 23' (pen.); Noelia 50'; Celia 90+3'	Stadium: Campo de fútbol El Castillo; Referee: Michelle Santana Corchado

10 September 2025	Villarreal	4–1	Alba Fundación	Villarreal
20:00 CEST (UTC+2)	Moreira 10'; Medina 37'; Blanco 42'; María 61'	Report	Ortega 35'	Stadium: Ciudad Deportiva Villarreal CF; Referee: Nuria Sánchez García

10 September 2025	Rayo Vallecano	1–0	Pozuelo de Alarcón	Madrid
20:00 CEST (UTC+2)	Noguchi 29'	Report	Montes (yellow card) 72' (yellow-red card) 89'	Stadium: Ciudad Deportiva Rayo Vallecano; Referee: Judith Barcala Salcedo

10 September 2025	Huesca	0–3	Osasuna	Huesca
20:00 CEST (UTC+2)		Report	Pérez 27'; Churruca 45+1'; Marí 68'	Stadium: Complejo Deportivo Municipal San Jorge; Referee: José Antonio Gimeno Otal

10 September 2025	Olympia Las Rozas	5–3	Getafe	Las Rozas de Madrid
20:00 CEST (UTC+2)	Sánchez 14', 52'; Albalat 39'; Peralta 50'; Alfayate 90'	Report	Okoye 42'; Alfayate 78' (o.g.); Clavijo 90+5'	Stadium: Polideportivo Dehesa de Navalcarbón; Referee: Candela González

10 September 2025	Cornellà	0–6	Europa	Cornellà de Llobregat
20:45 CEST (UTC+2)		Report	Plaza 3', 20'; Capón 6'; López 28'; Abad 71'; Sánchez 84'	Stadium: Camp Municipal de Cornella; Referee: Sandra González Jiménez

11 September 2025	Orientación Marítima	0–10	Guiniguada Apolinario	Las Palmas
17:00 CEST (UTC+1)		Report	Navarro 15', 17', 31', 39', 44'; Crucera 58', 62'; Estefi 77', 86', 88'	Stadium: Campo de Fútbol Municipal de Argana; Referee: Loreto Cabrera Martín

== Second round ==
=== Draw ===
The draw was completed by the RFEF on 15 September 2025, at the Ciudad del Fútbol de Las Rozas in Madrid. The games were played on September 30th and October 1st, 2025.

=== Matches ===
30 September 2025	SE AEM	1–3 (a.e.t.)	Europa	Lleida
19:00 CEST (UTC+2)	Yonei (yellow card) 29' (yellow-red card) 45'; Herrera 56'	Report	Plaza 32'; Bové 118'; Sánchez 120+2'	Stadium: Municipal de Recasens; Referee: Beatriz Arregui Gamir

30 September 2025	Villarreal	1–3	Valencia	Villarreal
20:00 CEST (UTC+2)	Salvador 45+5' (pen.)	Report	Mascarell 6'; Mrabet 57'; Ferrato 87'	Stadium: Ciudad Deportiva Villarreal CF; Referee: Patricia Luna Varo

1 October 2025	Sporting de Gijón	0–1	Real Oviedo	Gijón
17:30 CEST (UTC+2)		Report	Lois 48'	Stadium: Escuela de Fútbol de Mareo; Referee: Elena Labra Fernández

1 October 2025	Sporting de Huelva	3–0	Málaga	Huelva
17:30 CEST (UTC+2)	López 59'; Córdoba 84' (o.g.); Morales 87'	Report		Stadium: Ciudad Deportiva Francisco Mendoza; Referee: Deborah Aguilar Bonilla

1 October 2025	Racing Santander	0–3	Alavés	Astillero
18:00 CEST (UTC+2)		Report	Errasti 22'; Gil 28'; Ochoa 36'	Stadium: Municipal La Planchada; Referee: Verónica González Sánchez

1 October 2025	Guiniguada Apolinario	1–0	Femarguín Gran Canaria	Las Palmas
18:30 CEST (UTC+1)	Fernández 52'	Report		Stadium: Municipal Parque Atlantico; Referee: Jixiang Li Ramos

1 October 2025	Olympia Las Rozas	2–4	Osasuna	Las Rozas de Madrid
20:00 CEST (UTC+2)	Rincón 55'; Sánchez 90+1'	Report	de Torres 25', 90+3'; Fernández 59'; Bendoiro 81'	Stadium: Municipal Navalcarbón; Referee: Judith Barcala Salcedo

1 October 2025	Rayo Vallecano	1–5	Sport Extremadura	Madrid
20:00 CEST (UTC+2)	Búrdalo 85'	Report	Chaves 36', 64'; Pérez 52', 66'; Tena 80'	Stadium: Ciudad Deportiva Rayo Vallecano; Referee: Candela González

== Third round ==
=== Draw ===
The draw took place on 6 October 2025 by the RFEF in Madrid.

=== Teams ===
The teams participating in the Third round were:

Winners of Second round	Teams in position 9 to 14 from 2024-25 Liga F	Teams promoted to 2025-26 Liga F
Europa; Valencia; Real Oviedo; Sporting de Huelva; Alavés; Guiniguada Apolinario; Osasuna; Sport Extremadura	Sevilla; Madrid CFF; Espanyol; Levante; Badalona Women; Deportivo Abanca	Alhama; DUX Logroño

=== Matches ===
4 November 2025	Valencia	1–2	Espanyol	Valencia
19:00 CET (UTC+1)	Marcano 31'	Report	Baudet 5', 84'	Stadium: Ciudad Deportiva de Paterna; Attendance: 483; Referee: Beatriz Cuesta Arribas

4 November 2025	Osasuna	0–3	Badalona Women	Aranguren
19:00 CET (UTC+1)		Report	Navarro 30'; Sánchez 37'; Uribe 69'	Stadium: Tajonar Facilities; Attendance: 400; Referee: Elisabeth Calvo Valentín

5 November 2025	Alavés	4–0	Levante	Vitoria-Gasteiz
15:30 CET (UTC+1)	Guallar 39'; Sobrón 70'; Izal 74'; León 81'	Report		Stadium: Ciudad Deportiva José Luis Compañón; Referee: Ainara Andrea Acevedo

5 November 2025	Sport Extremadura	1–2	Alhama	Badajoz
19:00 CET (UTC+1)	Taborda 68'	Report	Lima 11' (pen.); Martínez 18' (o.g.)	Stadium: El Vivero; Referee: Andrea Fírvida Fernández

5 November 2025	Europa	1–1 (a.e.t.) (3–2 p)	DUX Logroño	Barcelona
19:00 CET (UTC+1)	López 45+2'	Report	Castro 34'	Stadium: Nou Sardenya; Attendance: 1,330; Referee: María Eugenia Gil Soriano
	Penalties
	Márquez (penalty scored); Labrador (penalty scored); Sánchez (penalty scored); Ferrer (penalty missed)		Martínez (penalty missed); Yeboah (penalty scored); Partido (penalty scored); Rubio (penalty missed); Congo (penalty missed)

5 November 2025	Guiniguada Apolinario	1–3	Deportivo Abanca	Las Palmas
20:00 CET (UTC+1)	Quintana 45+1'	Report	García 6' (pen.), 19'; Apóstol 74'	Stadium: Municipal Parque Atlantico; Referee: Paola Cebollada López

6 November 2025	Sporting de Huelva	1–7	Madrid CFF	Huelva
19:00 CET (UTC+1)	Pescatore 5'	Report	Andonova 4', 52'; Gorrado 32', 58'; Nautnes 36'; Rylov 76', 90+2'	Stadium: Ciudad Deportiva Francisco Mendoza; Attendance: 150; Referee: Elena Peláez Arnillas

6 November 2025	Real Oviedo	2–3	Sevilla	Oviedo
21:00 CET (UTC+1)	Blanco 70'; Díez Lois 90+2'	Report	Márquez 23'; Cerrato 60'; Álvarez 90+8'	Stadium: Estadio Carlos Tartiere; Referee: Ylenia Sánchez Miguel

== Round of 16 ==
=== Draw ===
The draw by the RFEF took place on November 11, 2025 at 16:30 CET (UTC+1).

=== Teams ===
The teams involved in the Round of 16 were:

Winners of Third round	Teams in position 1 to 8 from 2024-25 Liga F
Badalona Women; Espanyol; Alavés; Alhama; Europa; Deportivo Abanca; Madrid CFF; Sevilla	Barcelona; Real Madrid; Atlético Madrid; Athletic Club; Granada; Tenerife; Real Sociedad; Eibar

=== Matches ===
19 December 2025	Europa	0–3	Athletic Club	Barcelona
19:00 CET (UTC+1)		Report	Agote 34'; Valero 81'; Azkona 89'	Stadium: Nou Sardenya; Attendance: 2,043; Referee: Elisabeth Calvo Valentín

20 December 2025	Sevilla	1–2	Tenerife	Seville
12:00 CET (UTC+1)	Gabarro 9'	Report	Amani 12'; Rodríguez 48'	Stadium: Ciudad Deportiva José Ramón Cisneros Palacios; Attendance: 820; Referee: Alicia Espinosa Ríos

20 December 2025	Badalona Women	1–0	Granada	Palamós
19:00 CET (UTC+1)	Julve 23'	Report		Stadium: Estadi Palamós Costa Brava; Attendance: 258; Referee: Elena Peláez Arnillas

20 December 2025	Espanyol	0–4	Real Madrid	Sant Adrià de Besòs
19:00 CET (UTC+1)		Report	Caicedo 12', 53'; Santiago 44', 56'	Stadium: Ciutat Esportiva Dani Jarque; Referee: Beatriz Cuesta Arribas

21 December 2025	Madrid CFF	3–2	Eibar	Fuenlabrada
12:00 CET (UTC+1)	López 19'; Poljak 60'; Nautnes 86'	Report	Altonaga 81'; Andrés 90+2'	Stadium: Estadio Fernando Torres; Attendance: 158; Referee: María Gloria Planes

21 December 2025	Deportivo Abanca	1–4	Real Sociedad	Abegondo
12:00 CET (UTC+1)	Gutiérrez 70'	Report	Eguiguren 9'; Imade 57', 78'; Pardo 90+5'	Stadium: Ciudad deportiva de Abegondo; Attendance: 547; Referee: Ylenia Sánchez Miguel

21 December 2025	Alhama	1–1 (a.e.t.) (4–5 p)	Atlético Madrid	Alhama de Murcia
19:00 CET (UTC+1)	Martínez 90+5'	Report	García 15'; Luany (red card) 90+3'	Stadium: Complejo Deportivo Guadalentín; Attendance: 500; Referee: Andrea Fírvida Fernández
	Penalties
	Martínez (penalty scored); Velázquez (penalty scored); Quintero (penalty scored); Álvarez (penalty missed); Lima (penalty scored); Gestera (penalty missed)		(penalty scored) Bøe Risa; (penalty scored) Fiamma; (penalty scored) García; (penalty scored) Lloris; (penalty missed) Portales; (penalty scored) Vitória

21 December 2025	Alavés	1–6	Barcelona	Vitoria-Gasteiz
19:00 CET (UTC+1)	Sobrón 45+1'	Report	Nazareth 21'; Schertenleib 41'; Graham Hansen 59'; Izal 75' (o.g.); Serrajordi 82'; Pichi 96' (o.g.)	Stadium: Ciudad Deportiva José Luis Compañón; Attendance: 1,057; Referee: Melissa López Osorio

== Quarter-finals ==
=== Draw ===
The draw by the RFEF took place on 7 January 2026 at 16:30 CET (UTC+1).

=== Matches ===
4 February 2026	Atlético Madrid	4–1	Athletic Club	Madrid
18:45 CET (UTC+1)	Jensen 34'; Amaiur 39', 78'; Fiamma 64'	Report	Azkona 90+2'	Stadium: Centro Deportivo Wanda Alcalá de Henares; Attendance: 1,017; Referee: María Eugenia Gil

4 February 2026	Madrid CFF	0–1	Tenerife	Fuenlabrada
19:00 CET (UTC+1)		Report	Ouzraoui 2'	Stadium: Estadio Fernando Torres; Referee: María Gloria Planes

5 February 2026	Real Sociedad	0–1 (a.e.t.)	Badalona Women	Zubieta
19:00 CET (UTC+1)		Report	Pinillos 113'	Stadium: Zubieta Facilities; Referee: Alicia Espinosa Ríos

5 February 2026	Real Madrid	0–4	Barcelona	Madrid
21:00 CET (UTC+1)		Report	Putellas 21'; Pajor 68', 81'; Paralluelo 74'	Stadium: Alfredo Di Stéfano Stadium; Attendance: 3,765; Referee: Lorena del Mar Trujillano

== Semi-finals ==
=== Draw ===
The draw by the RFEF took place on 6 February 2026 at 13:00 CET (UTC+1) in Madrid.

=== Summary ===
Team 1	Agg.	Team 2	1st leg	2nd leg
Atlético Madrid	2–0	Tenerife	1–0	1–0
Badalona Women	1–4	Barcelona	0–0	1–4

=== Matches ===
11 March 2026
19:00 CET (UTC+1)

Atlético Madrid	1–0	Tenerife
Gio 75'	Report

Centro Deportivo Wanda Alcalá de Henares, Madrid
Attendance: 1,420
Referee: María Gloria Planes Terol
17 March 2026
19:00 CET (UTC+1)

Tenerife	0–1	Atlético Madrid
Dembele (red card) 89'	Report	Jensen 51'

Estadio Heliodoro Rodríguez López, Santa Cruz de Tenerife
Attendance: 6,535
Referee: Olatz Rivera Olmedo

12 March 2026
21:00 CET (UTC+1)

Badalona Women	0–0	Barcelona
	Report

Estadio municipal de Badalona, Badalona
Attendance: 3,000
Referee: Alicia Espinosa Ríos
18 March 2026
21:00 CET (UTC+1)

Barcelona	4–1	Badalona Women
Putellas 45+1', 62' (pen.); Kika 67'; Pajor 87'	Report	Chamorro 80'

Johan Cruyff Stadium, Sant Joan Despí
Attendance: 2,586
Referee: Lorena del Mar Trujillano Gallardo

== Final ==
16 May 2026
20:00 WEST (UTC+1)

Barcelona	3–1	Atlético Madrid
Pina 23'; Brugts 31'; Paralluelo 37'	Report	Bøe Risa 58'

Gran Canaria Stadium, Las Palmas
Attendance: 26,093
Referee: Olatz Rivera Olmedo

Barcelona	Atlético Madrid

GK	13	(Spain) Cata Coll
DF	4	(Spain) Mapi León
DF	22	(Spain) Ona Batlle	(substituted off) 87'
DF	23	(Spain) Aïcha Cámara
MF	11	(Spain) Alexia Putellas (c)	(substituted off) 62'
MF	12	(Spain) Patricia Guijarro
MF	19	(Spain) Vicky López	(substituted off) 87'
MF	24	(Netherlands) Esmee Brugts	(yellow card) 81'
FW	7	(Spain) Salma Paralluelo	(substituted off) 61'
FW	9	(Spain) Clàudia Pina	(substituted off) 74'
FW	17	(Poland) Ewa Pajor
Substitutes:
GK	1	(Spain) Gemma Font
GK	37	(Spain) Txell Font
DF	2	(Spain) Irene Paredes
DF	8	(Spain) Marta Torrejón	(substituted on) 87'
DF	40	(Spain) Adriana Ranera
DF	43	(Spain) Carla Julià
MF	6	(Switzerland) Sydney Schertenleib	(substituted on) 87'
MF	14	(Spain) Aitana Bonmatí	(substituted on) 74'
MF	16	(Spain) Clara Serrajordi	(substituted on) 62', (yellow card) 82'
FW	18	(Portugal) Kika Nazareth	(substituted on) 61'
FW	35	(Norway) Martine Fenger
Manager:
(Spain) Pere Romeu

GK	1	(Spain) Lola Gallardo (c)	(yellow card) 52'
DF	3	(Spain) Andrea Medina
DF	4	(Brazil) Lauren Leal
DF	5	(Spain) Xènia Pérez
DF	11	(Spain) Carmen Menayo	(substituted off) 57'
DF	23	(Spain) Alexia Fernández	(substituted off) 66'
MF	6	(Norway) Vilde Bøe Risa
MF	7	(Sweden) Synne Jensen	(substituted off) 78'
MF	21	(Spain) Fiamma Benítez
MF	27	(Spain) Natalia Peñalvo	(yellow card) 61', (substituted off) 66'
FW	20	(Spain) Amaiur Sarriegi	(substituted off) 57'
Substitutes:
GK	13	(Spain) Patricia Larqué
GK	31	(Spain) Alba Bucero
DF	14	(Spain) Rosa Otermín	(substituted on) 66', (yellow card) 86'
DF	15	(Spain) Silvia Lloris
DF	41	(Spain) Lydia Rodríguez Pascual
MF	16	(Costa Rica) Priscila Chinchilla	(substituted on) 78'
MF	17	(Spain) Júlia Bartel	(substituted on) 66'
MF	22	(Brazil) Luany	(substituted on) 57'
FW	9	(Spain) Sheila Guijarro
FW	18	(Brazil) Gio Garbelini	(substituted on) 57', (yellow card) 74'
FW	19	(Spain) Macarena Portales
Manager:
(Spain) José Ángel Herrera

Most valuable player (MVP):
Clàudia Pina
Assistant referees:
Iragartze Fernández Esesumaga
Haizea Castresana
Fourth official:
Marta Huerta de Aza

Match rules

- 90 minutes.
- 30 minutes of extra time if necessary.
- Penalty shoot-out if scores still level.
- Maximum of twelve named substitutes.
- Maximum of five substitutions, with a sixth allowed in extra time. (Note: Each team is given only three opportunities to make substitutions, with a fourth opportunity in extra time, excluding substitutions made at half-time, before the start of extra time and at half-time in extra time.)
- Maximum of one concussion substitution.

== Top goalscorers ==
As of 16 May 2026

Rank	Player	Club	Goals
1	(Spain) Alba Navarro	Guiniguada Apolinario	5
2	(Spain) Raquel Gil	Alavés	4
3	(Spain) Alexia Putellas	Barcelona	3
3	(Poland) Ewa Pajor	Barcelona	3
3	(Spain) Estefanía Rodríguez	Guiniguada Apolinario	3
3	(Spain) Ainhoa Plaza	Europa	3
3	(Spain) Amanda Chaves	Sport Extremadura	3
3	(Spain) Lucía Sánchez	Olympia Las Rozas	3
3	(Spain) Bárbara López Gorrado	Madrid CFF	3
