= 2018–19 Primera División (women) =

Primera División
- Season: 2018–19
- Dates: 8 September 2018 – 11 May 2019
- Teams: 16
- Champions: Atlético de Madrid (3rd title)
- Relegated: Málaga; Fundación Albacete
- Champions League: Atlético de Madrid; Barcelona
- Matches: 240
- Goals: 725 (3.02 per match)
- Top goalscorer: Jennifer Hermoso (23 goals)
- Biggest home win: Barcelona 9–1 Rayo Vallecano (14 October 2018)
- Biggest away win: Fundación Albacete 1–6 Barcelona (30 September 2018)
- Highest scoring: Barcelona 9–1 Rayo Vallecano (14 October 2018)
- Longest winning run: 14 games Atlético de Madrid
- Longest unbeaten run: 20 games Barcelona
- Longest winless run: 14 games Málaga
- Longest losing run: 10 games Sevilla
- Highest attendance: 60,739; Atlético de Madrid 0–2 Barcelona (17 March 2019)

The 2018–19 Primera División Femenina de Fútbol was the 31st edition of Spain's highest women's football league. The season started on 3 September 2018 and ended on 11 May 2019. Atlético Madrid won their third consecutive title.

== Teams ==
Location of the 2018–19 Primera División teams
Canary Islands location of the 2018–19 Primera División teams

Málaga and Logroño joined the league after earning promotion at the conclusion of the 2017–18 Segunda División.

=== Stadia and locations ===
Team	Home city	Stadium
Athletic Club	(Basque Country (autonomous community)) Bilbao	Lezama
Atlético de Madrid	(Community of Madrid) Madrid	Cerro del Espino
Barcelona	(Catalonia) Barcelona	Joan Gamper
Betis	(Andalusia) Seville	Luis del Sol
Espanyol	(Catalonia) Barcelona	Dani Jarque
Fundación Albacete	(Castilla–La Mancha) Albacete	Andrés Iniesta
Granadilla	(Canary Islands) Granadilla de Abona	La Palmera
Levante	(Valencian Community) Valencia	Ciudad Deportiva de Buñol
Logroño	(La Rioja) Logroño	Las Gaunas
Madrid CFF	(Community of Madrid) San Sebastián de los Reyes	Nuevo Matapiñonera
Málaga	(Andalusia) Málaga	Federación Malagueña
Rayo Vallecano	(Community of Madrid) Madrid	Ciudad Deportiva
Real Sociedad	(Basque Country (autonomous community)) San Sebastián	Zubieta
Sevilla	(Andalusia) Seville	Jesús Navas
Sporting de Huelva	(Andalusia) Huelva	La Orden
Valencia	(Valencian Community) Valencia	Antonio Puchades

=== Personnel and sponsorship ===
Team	Head coach	Captain	Kit manufacturer	Main shirt sponsor
Athletic Club	Joseba Agirre	Ainhoa Tirapu	New Balance	Kutxabank
Atlético de Madrid	José Luis Sánchez Vera	Amanda Sampedro	Nike	Herbalife
Barcelona	Lluís Cortés	Vicky Losada	Nike	Stanley
Betis	María Pry	Irene Guerrero	Kappa	
Espanyol	Salvador Jaspe	Paloma Fernández	Kelme	Miró
Fundación Albacete	Carlos del Valle	Matilde Martínez	Hummel	Seguros Solíss
Granadilla	Pier Luigi Cherubino	Cindy García	Erreà	Egatesa
Levante	Kino	Sonia Prim	Macron	
Logroño	Chechu Martínez	Rebeca Moreno	Joma	Gesitma
Madrid CFF	Manuel Aguado	Paola Ulloa	Nike	
Málaga	Antonio Contreras	Adriana Martín	Nike	Tesesa
Rayo Vallecano	Irene Ferreras	Alicia Gómez	Kelme	
Real Sociedad	Gonzalo Arconada	Sandra Ramajo	Macron	Euskaltel
Sevilla	Cristian Toro	Alicia Fuentes	Nike	Playtika
Sporting de Huelva	Antonio Toledo	Anita Hernández	John Smith	Puerto de Huelva
Valencia	Carolina Miranda	Gio Carreras	Adidas	Herbolario Navarro

=== Managerial changes ===
Team	Outgoing manager	Manner of departure	Date of vacancy	Position in table	Incoming manager	Date of appointment
Granadilla	Antonio Ayala	Medical reasons	14 September 2018	9th	Pier Luigi Cherubino	1 October 2018
Madrid CFF	Miguel Ángel Quejigo	Sacked	12 November 2018	15th	Víctor Martín	12 November 2018
Sevilla	Paco García	Sacked	11 December 2018	16th	Cristian Toro	14 December 2018
Barcelona	Fran Sánchez	Sacked	8 January 2019	2nd	Lluis Cortés	8 January 2019
Espanyol	Joan Bacardit	Resigned	4 February 2019	11th	Salvador Jaspe	5 February 2019
Logroño	Héctor Blanco	Sacked	26 February 2019	15th	Chechu Martínez	26 February 2019
Valencia	Óscar Suárez	Sacked	15 April 2019	8th	Carolina Miranda	15 April 2019
Madrid CFF	Víctor Martín	Sacked	17 April 2019	16th	Manuel Aguado	17 April 2019

== List of foreign players ==
(Italic)Players has come in Winter transfer

Athletic Club

- 'no foreign players'

Ex foreign players: Summer

- None

Winter

- None

Atlético de Madrid

- (Switzerland) Jennifer Oehrli
- (Italy) Elena Linari
- (Mexico) Kenti Robles
- (Portugal) Dolores Silva
- (Brazil) Ludmilla
- (Australia) Alex Chidiac
- (France) Aïssatou Tounkara
- (Switzerland) Viola Calligaris

Ex foreign players: Summer

- None

Winter

- None

Barcelona

- (Netherlands) Stefanie van der Gragt
- (Mexico) Pamela Tajonar
- (England) Toni Duggan
- (France) Kheira Hamraoui
- (Nigeria) Asisat Oshoala
- (North Macedonia) Nataša Andonova
- (Netherlands) Lieke Martens

Ex foreign players: Summer

- THERE ISN'T ANY

Winter

- (France) Elise Bussaglia

Betis

- (United States) Emily Dolan
- (Netherlands) Merel van Dongen
- (Japan) Erina Yamane
- (Azerbaijan) Yaiza Relea Ramos
- (Argentina) Marianela Szymanowski

Ex foreign players: Summer

- THERE ISN'T ANY

Winter

- THERE ISN'T ANY

Espanyol

- (Japan) Ayaki Shinada
- (Paraguay) Dulce Quintana
- (Costa Rica) Katherine Alvarado

Ex foreign players: Summer

- THERE ISN'T ANY

Winter

- THERE ISN'T ANY

Fundación Albacete

- (Japan) Hitomi Yama
- (Japan) Tomo Matsukawa
- (Montenegro) Slađana Bulatović
- (Venezuela) Sandra Luzardo
- (Slovenia) Eva Vamberger

Ex foreign players: Summer

- (Mexico) Annia Mejia
- (Colombia) Vanesa Córdoba

Winter

- THERE ISN'T ANY

Granadilla

- (Ivory Coast) Ange N'Guessan
- (Georgia (country)) Tatiana Matveeva
- (Brazil) Joyce
- (Brazil) Aline Reis
- (Cameroon) Raissa Feudjio
- (Venezuela) Nayluisa Cáceres

Ex foreign players: Summer

- (Japan) Ayano Dozono
- (Lithuania) Liucija Vaitukaitytė
- (United States) Jackie Simpson

Winter

- THERE ISN'T ANY

Levante

- (Mexico) Charlyn Corral
- (Romania) Andreea Părăluță
- (Australia) Aivi Luik
- (Argentina) Estefanía Banini
- (Mexico) Charlyn Corral

Ex foreign players: Summer

- None

Winter

- None

Logroño

- (Chile) Ámbar Soruco
- (Argentina) Vanesa Santana
- (Equatorial Guinea) Jade Boho Sayo
- (Zambia) Barbra Banda
- (Brazil) Nágela
- (Ivory Coast) Ida Guehai
- (United States) Claire Falknor
- (Equatorial Guinea) Dorine Chuigoué
- (United States) Cami Privett
- (The Gambia) Fatou Kanteh

Ex foreign players: Summer

- None

Winter

- None

Madrid CFF

- (Argentina) Agustina Barroso
- (Germany) Eunice Beckmann
- (Guatemala) Ana Lucía Martínez
- (Morocco) Yasmin Mrabet

Ex foreign players: Summer

- None

Winter

- None

Málaga

- (England) Chelsea Ashurst
- (Mali) Bassira Toure
- (Uruguay) Pamela González
- (Brazil) Mayara Bordin
- (South Africa) Ode Fulutudilu
- (Montenegro) Armisa Kuč
- (Japan) Minori Chiba
- (Slovenia) Dominika Čonč
- (Colombia) Stefany Castaño
- (Cameroon) Gaëlle Enganamouit

Ex foreign players: Summer

- (Mexico) Natalia Gómez Junco
- (Jamaica) Siobhan Wilson

Winter

- THERE ISN'T ANY

Rayo Vallecano

- (Chile) Carla Guerrero
- (Argentina) Yael Oviedo
- (Venezuela) Oriana Altuve
- (Chile) Camila Sáez
- (Serbia) Jelena Čubrilo
- (Azerbaijan) Marta Perarnau

Ex foreign players: Summer

- THERE ISN'T ANY

Winter

- THERE ISN'T ANY

Real Sociedad

- (Mexico) Kiana Palacios

Ex foreign players: Summer

- None

Winter

- None

Sevilla

- (Brazil) Isadora Haas Gehlen
- (United States) Toni Payne
- (Chile) Karen Araya
- (Argentina) Aldana Cometti
- (Chile) Francisco Lara
- (Lithuania) Liucija Vaitukaitytė
- (Russia) Nadezhda Karpova

Ex foreign players: Summer

- None

Winter

- None

Sporting de Huelva

- (Chile) Geraldine Leyton
- (Romania) Elena Pavel
- (Morocco) Meryem Hajri
- (Ukraine) Yulia Kornievets
- (Paraguay) Lice Chamorro
- (Argentina) Florencia Bonsegundo
- (Ukraine) Albina Formchenko
- (Brazil) Ludmila Barbosa da Silva
- (Chile) Yessenia López
- (Brazil) Raquel Fernandes
- (Brazil) Monica Bitencourt
- (Ukraine) Vera Djatel

Ex foreign players: Summer

- (Chile) Geraldine Leyton
- (Chile) Bárbara Santibáñez

Winter

- None

Valencia

- (Netherlands) Mandy van den Berg
- (Mexico) Mónica Flores
- (Namibia) Zenatha Coleman
- (Chile) Yanara Aedo
- (Netherlands) Jennifer Vreugdenhil
- (Colombia) Natalia Gaitán

Ex foreign players: Summer

- (Russia) Nadezhda Karpova

Winter

- None

== League table ==
Pos	Team	Pld	W	D	L	GF	GA	GD	Pts	Qualification or relegation
1	Atlético de Madrid (C)	30	28	0	2	96	19	+77	84	Qualification for the UEFA Champions League
2	Barcelona	30	25	3	2	94	15	+79	78	Qualification for the UEFA Champions League
3	Levante	30	17	6	7	52	26	+26	57	
4	Granadilla	30	17	3	10	46	40	+6	54	
5	Athletic Club	30	14	8	8	48	33	+15	50	
6	Betis	30	14	6	10	47	35	+12	48	
7	Real Sociedad	30	13	8	9	51	37	+14	47	
8	Valencia	30	8	11	11	41	53	−12	35	
9	Espanyol	30	9	8	13	31	42	−11	35	
10	Sevilla	30	9	2	19	37	60	−23	29	
11	Logroño	30	8	5	17	38	60	−22	29	
12	Rayo Vallecano	30	8	5	17	27	55	−28	29	
13	Madrid CFF	30	8	3	19	31	65	−34	27	
14	Sporting de Huelva	30	6	7	17	22	50	−28	25	
15	Málaga (R)	30	6	7	17	26	67	−41	25	Relegation to Segunda División
16	Fundación Albacete (R)	30	6	6	18	38	68	−30	24	Relegation to Segunda División

Source: La Liga
Rules for classification: 1) points; 2) head-to-head points; 3) goal difference; 4) number of goals scored
(C) Champions; (R) Relegated

== Results ==
Home \ Away	ATH	ATM	BAR	BET	ESP	FUN	GRA	LEV	LOG	MAD	MGA	RAY	RSO	SEV	SPH	VAL
Athletic Club	—	2–4	0–1	2–2	1–2	2–0	2–0	2–0	4–3	3–0	0–0	1–0	2–1	6–0	4–0	2–2
Atlético de Madrid	3–0	—	0–2	3–1	3–1	6–1	2–0	2–0	6–0	6–1	4–1	3–0	5–0	3–0	3–1	3–0
Barcelona	2–1	2–1	—	3–0	0–0	3–1	3–0	0–0	2–0	7–0	6–0	9–1	4–1	6–2	2–3	3–0
Betis	0–0	1–2	0–3	—	2–0	3–0	1–2	0–0	3–2	3–1	1–1	3–1	2–1	1–1	1–0	4–0
Espanyol	1–2	0–1	0–3	1–0	—	2–4	1–1	2–1	1–0	1–0	1–1	1–1	1–1	2–0	2–1	1–1
Fundación Albacete	0–1	1–4	1–6	2–3	3–2	—	1–3	0–1	2–2	3–1	1–1	2–1	0–1	1–2	3–2	0–2
Granadilla	3–1	1–2	1–0	1–2	2–1	1–0	—	0–6	1–0	2–3	1–0	2–3	2–3	2–1	3–1	3–0
Levante	2–0	0–4	0–1	2–1	4–0	3–1	3–2	—	4–0	0–1	7–0	1–0	1–1	1–0	1–1	0–0
Logroño	1–3	1–3	0–4	1–0	2–0	4–1	0–1	2–4	—	2–1	1–2	3–0	2–2	1–2	2–0	0–0
Madrid CFF	2–0	0–3	0–4	1–3	1–1	1–1	0–1	2–3	4–0	—	1–0	0–4	0–2	0–1	3–1	1–1
Málaga	0–2	0–4	0–4	0–3	2–1	4–2	1–3	0–1	1–1	2–1	—	4–2	1–3	3–1	1–1	1–4
Rayo Vallecano	1–1	0–3	0–4	0–0	1–5	2–0	0–2	0–1	1–1	0–1	1–0	—	2–1	0–1	1–0	1–1
Real Sociedad	2–2	1–3	2–5	1–0	0–0	1–1	1–1	1–2	3–0	3–0	3–0	2–0	—	2–0	0–1	6–0
Sevilla	1–2	1–3	0–2	2–3	0–1	2–4	0–2	1–0	3–4	3–0	5–0	2–0	0–2	—	2–1	2–2
Sporting de Huelva	0–0	0–3	1–3	1–0	1–0	0–0	1–1	1–1	0–2	0–2	2–0	0–1	0–0	2–1	—	0–2
Valencia	0–0	0–4	0–0	1–4	3–0	2–2	1–2	1–3	2–1	5–3	0–0	1–2	0–4	4–1	6–0	—

Source: La Liga
Legend: Blue = home team win; Yellow = draw; Red = away team win.

== Season statistics ==
=== Top goalscorers ===
Rank	Player	Club	Goals
1	(Spain) Jennifer Hermoso	Atlético de Madrid	24
2	(Mexico) Charlyn Corral	Levante	20
3	(Spain) Nahikari García	Real Sociedad	16
3	(Spain) Alexia Putellas	Barcelona	16
5	(Spain) Alba Redondo	Fundación Albacete	15
6	(Spain) María José Pérez	Granadilla	14
6	(Spain) Mari Paz Vilas	Valencia	14
8	(Spain) Lucía García	Athletic Club	13
8	(Spain) Esther González	Atlético de Madrid	13
10	(Spain) Aitana Bonmatí	Barcelona	12
10	(Spain) Priscila Borja	Betis	12
10	(Spain) Olga García	Atlético de Madrid	12

=== Hat-tricks ===
Player	For	Against	Result	Round
(Venezuela) Oriana Altuve	Rayo Vallecano	Madrid CFF	0–4 (a)	3
(Spain) Alexia Putellas^{4}	Barcelona	Fundación Albacete	9–1 (h)	5
(Spain) Esther González	Atlético de Madrid	Madrid CFF	6–1 (h)	6
(Mexico) Charlyn Corral	Levante	Málaga	7–0 (h)	9
(Spain) Olga García	Atlético de Madrid	Real Sociedad	5–0 (h)	11
(Spain) Nahikari García	Real Sociedad	Valencia	0–4 (a)	15
(Mexico) Charlyn Corral	Levante	Logroño	2–4 (a)	15
(Spain) Jennifer Hermoso	Atlético de Madrid	Málaga	4–1 (h)	18
(Spain) Mari Paz Vilas	Valencia	Madrid CFF	5–3 (h)	20
(Spain) Lucía García	Athletic Club	Logroño	4–3 (h)	23
(Spain) Jennifer Hermoso	Atlético de Madrid	Levante	4–0 (h)	25
(Spain) Esther González	Atlético de Madrid	Real Sociedad	1–3 (a)	30

^{4} Player scored 4 goals

=== Best goalkeepers ===
Rank	Player	Club	Goals against	Matches	Coeff.
1	(Spain) Sandra Paños	Barcelona	11	27	0.407
2	(Spain) Dolores Gallardo	Atlético de Madrid	19	28	0.679
3	(Romania) Andreea Părăluță	Levante	20	24	0.833
4	(Spain) Ainhoa Tirapu	Athletic Club	22	23	0.957
5	(Japan) Erina Yamane	Betis	23	21	1.095

=== Player of the week ===
Week	Player of the Week	Club	Week's Statline
Week 1	Alba Redondo	Fundación Albacete	2G, 1A (vs Sevilla)
Week 2	Paula Sancho	Fundación Albacete	2G (vs Madrid CFF)
Week 3	Oriana Altuve	Rayo Vallecano	3G (vs Madrid CFF)
Week 4	Bea Parra	Betis	2G (vs Madrid CFF)
Week 5	Alexia Putellas	Barcelona	4G (vs Rayo Vallecano)
Week 6	Esther González	Atlético de Madrid	3G (vs Madrid CFF)
Week 7	Vanessa Santana	Granadilla	2G (vs Sevilla)
Week 8	Laia Aleixandri	Atlético de Madrid	1G (vs Levante)
Week 9	Estela Fernández	Madrid CFF	2G (vs Logroño)
Week 10	Alba Redondo	Granadilla	2G (vs Valencia)
Week 11	Priscila Borja	Betis	2G (vs Valencia)
Week 12	Ángela Sosa	Levante	2G, 2A (vs Valencia)
Week 13	Erika Vázquez	Athletic Club	CS (vs Sevilla)
Week 14	Sheila García	Rayo Vallecano	1G (vs Valencia)
Week 15	Charlyn Corral	Betis	3G (vs Logroño)
Week 16	Núria Mendoza	Real Sociedad	1G (vs Logroño)
Week 17	Elena Linari	Atlético de Madrid	1G (vs Logroño)
Week 18	Jennifer Hermoso	Atlético de Madrid	3G (vs Málaga)
Week 19	Débora García	Valencia	2G (vs Málaga)
Week 20	Elena de Toro	Fundación Albacete	2G (vs Sporting de Huelva)
Week 21	Sara Serrat	Sporting de Huelva	(vs Barcelona)
Week 22	Macarena Portales	Sevilla	2A (vs Logroño)
Week 23	Raquel Pinel	Sevilla	2G (vs Málaga)
Week 24	Jade Boho	Logroño	1G (vs Madrid CFF)
Week 25	Estela Fernández	Madrid CFF	1G (vs Málaga)
Week 26	Eli del Estal	Espanyol	1G (vs Real Sociedad)
Week 27	Carla Bautista	Real Sociedad	1G, 1A (vs Valencia)
Week 28	Jade Boho	Logroño	2G (vs Rayo Vallecano)
Week 29	Slađana Bulatović	Fundación Albacete	2G (vs Espanyol)

=== Notable attendances ===
- 60,739 Atlético de Madrid 0–2 Barcelona (17 March 2019 at Wanda Metropolitano; world record in a match of women's football between clubs)
- 24,986 Athletic Club 2–0 Levante (31 March 2019 at San Mamés)
- 23,812 Betis 1–1 Sevilla (13 April 2019 at Estadio Benito Villamarín)
- 21,234 Real Sociedad 2–2 Athletic Club (10 February 2019 at Anoeta)
- 20,615 Espanyol 0–1 Atlético de Madrid (22 April 2019 at RCDE Stadium)
- 20,198 Levante 0–0 Valencia (9 December 2018 at Ciutat de València)

== Best XI of the Season ==

All-season team

On 27 June 2016, La Liga named their best XI of the 2018-19 Primera Division season.

Pos	Name	Team
GK	Sandra Paños	Barcelona
DF	Kenti Robles	Atlético Madrid
DF	Mapi	Barcelona
DF	Vanesa Gimbert	Athletic Bilbao
DF	Marta Torrejón	Barcelona
MF	Silvia Meseguer	Atlético Madrid
MF	Irene Guerrero	Real Betis Féminas
MF	Alexia Putellas	Barcelona
MF	Ángela Sosa	Atlético Madrid
FW	Nahikari García	Real Sociedad
FW	Jenni Hermoso	Atlético Madrid
