= List of Atlético Madrid Femenino seasons =

This is a list of seasons played by Atlético Madrid Femenino, Atlético Madrid's women's section in Spanish and European football, from the creation of its original incarnation, Atlético Villa de Madrid, to the latest completed season.

== Key ==
- Rank = Final position
- P = Played
- W = Games won
- D = Games drawn
- L = Games lost
- F = Goals for
- A = Goals against
- GD = Goal difference
- Pts = Points
- CdR = Copa de la Reina
- SdE = Supercopa de España Femenina
- Europe = UEFA international competitions
- R1 = Round 1 of qualifying rounds
- R32 = Round of 32
- R16 = Round of 16
- QF = Quarter-finals
- SF = Semi-finals
- RU = Runners-Up
- W = Champions
- GS = Group stage
- KO = Knockout phase play-offs

| Champions | Runners-up | Promoted | Relegated |

== Summary ==
| Season | League | | | | | | | | | CdR | SdE | UWCL | Top scorer | |
| Season | League | Pos | Pld | W | D | L | GF | GA | Pts | CdR | SdE | UWCL | Name(s) | Goal |
|---|---|---|---|---|---|---|---|---|---|---|---|---|---|---|
| 1989–90 | 1ª | 1st | 22 | 20 | 1 | 1 | 121 | 33 | 41 | | | | | |
| 1990–91 | 1ª | 2nd | 14 | 9 | 2 | 3 | 32 | 22 | 20 | SF | | | | |
| 1991–92 | 1ª | 7th | 14 | 3 | 5 | 6 | 37 | 45 | 11 | | | | | |
The team was disestablished after the 1991–92 season, and remained inactive for nine seasons
| 2001–02 | 1ª Reg. | 1st | | | | | | | | | | | | |
| 2002–03 | Pref. | 1st | 26 | 20 | 4 | 2 | 93 | 18 | 64 | | | | | |
| 2003–04 | 2ª | 2nd | 26 | 17 | 6 | 3 | 49 | 17 | 57 | | | | | |
| 2004–05 | 2ª | 2nd | 24 | 20 | 3 | 1 | 91 | 23 | 63 | | | | | |
| 2005–06 | 2ª | 1st | 25 | 24 | 0 | 1 | 114 | 13 | 72 | | | | | |
| 2006–07 | 1ª | 8th | 26 | 8 | 7 | 11 | 31 | 46 | 31 | QF | | | | |
| 2007–08 | 1ª | 7th | 26 | 11 | 3 | 12 | 36 | 42 | 36 | SF | | | | |
| 2008–09 | 1ª | 7th | 30 | 14 | 6 | 10 | 49 | 33 | 48 | QF | | | | |
| 2009–10 | 1ª | 4th | 26 | 12 | 6 | 8 | 51 | 39 | 42 | 1R | | | | |
| 2010–11 | 1ª | 5th | 26 | 14 | 4 | 8 | 53 | 39 | 46 | SF | | | (Spain) Priscila Borja | 16 |
| 2011–12 | 1ª | 6th | 34 | 20 | 5 | 9 | 83 | 41 | 65 | | | | (Spain) Adriana Martín | 25 |
| 2012–13 | 1ª | 3rd | 30 | 20 | 8 | 2 | 70 | 21 | 68 | SF | | | (Spain) Priscila Borja | 13 |
| 2013-14 | 1ª | 3rd | 30 | 16 | 6 | 8 | 72 | 35 | 54 | QF | | | (Spain) Amanda Sampedro | 16 |
| 2014–15 | 1ª | 2nd | 30 | 20 | 9 | 1 | 54 | 21 | 69 | SF | | | (Spain) Priscila Borja | 17 |
| 2015–16 | 1ª | 3rd | 30 | 22 | 3 | 5 | 83 | 24 | 69 | W | | R16 | (Spain) Sonia Bermúdez | 20 |
| 2016–17 | 1ª | 1st | 30 | 24 | 6 | 0 | 92 | 17 | 78 | RU | | | (Spain) Sonia Bermúdez | 32 |
| 2017–18 | 1ª | 1st | 30 | 24 | 5 | 1 | 74 | 21 | 77 | RU | | R32 | (Spain) Sonia Bermúdez | 20 |
| 2018–19 | 1ª | 1st | 30 | 28 | 0 | 2 | 96 | 19 | 84 | RU | | R16 | (Spain) Jennifer Hermoso | 24 |
| 2019–20 | 1ª | 2nd | 21 | 15 | 5 | 1 | 43 | 17 | 50 | R16 | SF | QF | (Spain) Ángela Sosa | 9 |
| 2020–21 | 1ª | 4th | 34 | 18 | 9 | 7 | 61 | 32 | 63 | SF | W | R16 | (Brazil) Ludmila | 15 |
| 2021–22 | 1ª | 4th | 30 | 17 | 8 | 5 | 71 | 28 | 59 | R16 | RU | | (Nigeria) Rasheedat Ajibade | 10 |
| 2022–23 | 1ª | 4th | 30 | 16 | 9 | 5 | 54 | 35 | 57 | W | | | (Nigeria) Rasheedat Ajibade | 9 |
| 2023–24 | 1ª | 3rd | 30 | 18 | 7 | 5 | 53 | 22 | 61 | SF | SF | | (Spain) Sheila Guijarro | 13 |
| 2024–25 | 1ª | 3rd | 30 | 16 | 10 | 4 | 49 | 23 | 58 | RU | SF | R1 | (Nigeria) Rasheedat Ajibade | 7 |
| 2025–26 | 1ª | 5th | 30 | 14 | 9 | 7 | 63 | 39 | 51 | RU | SF | KO | (Spain) Fiamma Benítez | 9 |

- References: Futbolme,Soccerway,
