= Alba Merino =

Spanish footballer (born 1989)

Personal information
- Full name: Alba Merino Sánchez
- Date of birth: 15 May 1989 (age 37)
- Place of birth: Guadiana del Caudillo, Spain
- Height: 1.62 m (5 ft 4 in)
- Position: Midfielder

Team information
- Current team: Deportivo La Coruña
- Number: 8

Senior career*
Years	Team	Apps	(Gls)
2003–2007	Puebla		
2007–2011	Atlético Madrid		
2011–2017	Levante	161	(12)
2017–2018	Santa Teresa	28	(10)
2018–	Deportivo La Coruña	52	(14)

International career
- Spain U-19
- * Club domestic league appearances and goals as of 11:23, 12 October 2021 (UTC)

Alba Merino Sánchez (born 15 May 1989) is a Spanish football midfielder who plays for Deportivo La Coruña of Spain's Segunda División. As of July 2021, she holds the record for being the youngest footballer to feature in Spain's Primera División. She also scored Deportivo's first ever goal in the Primera División.

== Career ==
Merino is originally from Guadiana. Playing for Puebla, in 2003, she became the youngest player to feature in the top tier of women's football in Spain and, as of July 2021, she remains the holder of this record. In 2007, her transfer from Puebla to Atlético Madrid was announced. At Atlético, she played alongside Jennifer Hermoso and was the team's top goalscorer in the 2008–09 season. In the summer of 2018, she transferred from Santa Teresa to Deportivo La Coruña. While playing for Deportivo, in the club's 2018–19 season, she participated in their promotion to the Primera División, scoring 17 goals in 21 league games. Merino would go on to score Deportivo's first ever goal in the top tier of Spanish football, scoring a header against Espanyol after a shot from Noelia Villegas was adjudged to have not crossed the line. She also featured in 18 out of the team's first 21 fixtures in the 2019–20 season. Following Deportivo's relegation back to the Segunda División in the following season, Deportivo renewed Merino's contract for one more season, indicating their intention to build the team around Merino.
