= Sara López (disambiguation) =

Sara López is a Colombian archer.

Sara López may also refer to:

- Sara López (footballer), Spanish footballer
- Sara López (sailor), Spanish sailor
