= Bea Beltrán =

Spanish footballer (born 1997)

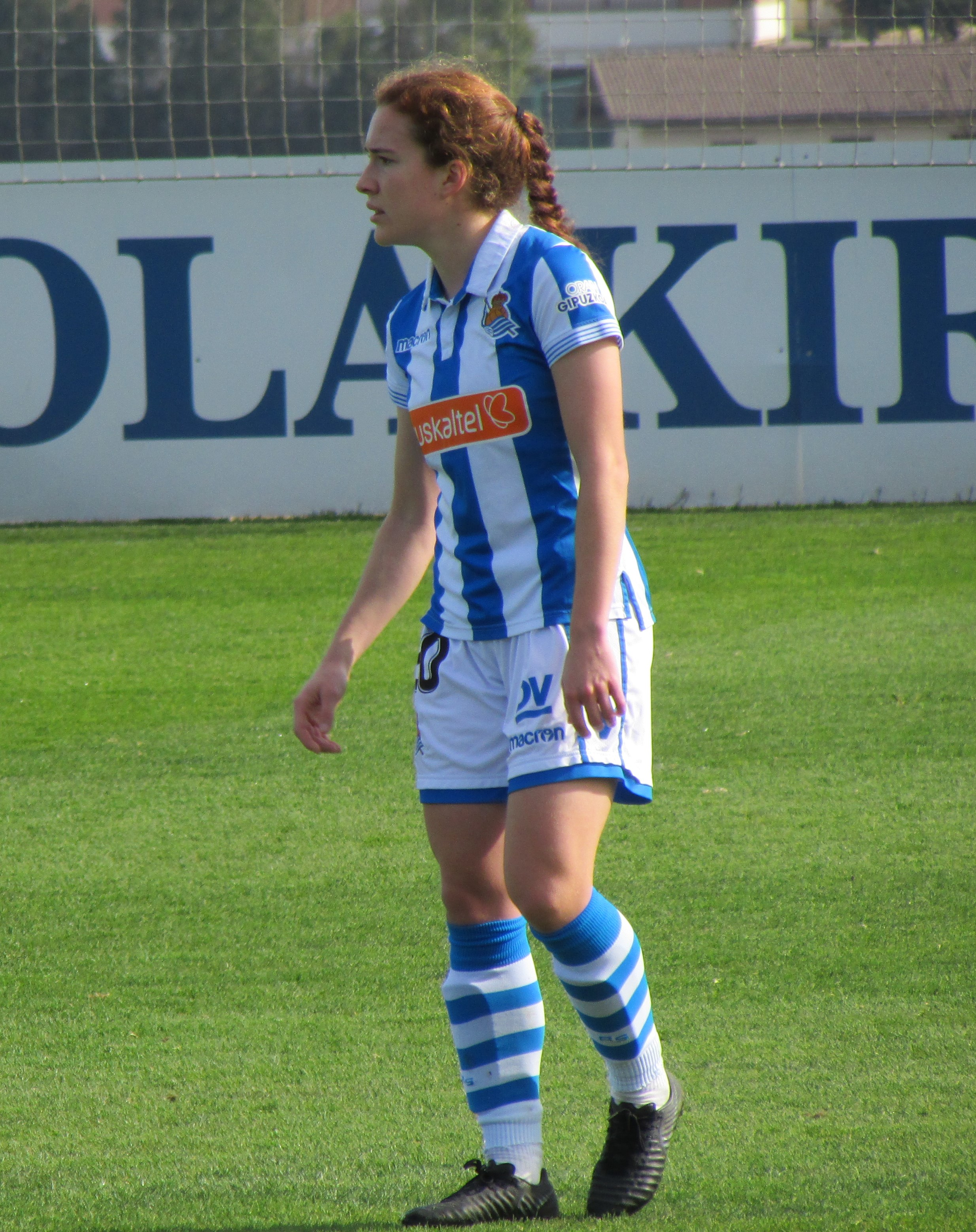

Personal information
- Full name: Beatriz Beltrán Sanz
- Date of birth: 10 December 1997 (age 28)
- Place of birth: Tres Cantos, Spain
- Height: 1.60 m (5 ft 3 in)
- Position: Defender

Team information
- Current team: Valencia
- Number: 3

Senior career*
Years	Team	Apps	(Gls)
2012–2013	Atlético Madrid C		
2013–2014	Atlético Madrid B		
2013–2017	Atlético Madrid	44	(2)
2017–2019	Real Sociedad	50	(2)
2019–	Valencia	56	(4)
- * Club domestic league appearances and goals as of 22:37, 22 February 2022 (UTC)

Beatriz Beltrán Sanz (born 10 December 1997) is a Spanish footballer who plays as a defender for Valencia.

== Club career ==
Bea Beltrán started her career at Atlético Madrid C.
