= Noelia Villegas =

Spanish footballer (born 1996)

Personal information
- Full name: Noelia Villegas Rico
- Date of birth: 7 January 1996 (age 30)
- Place of birth: Cádiz, Spain
- Height: 1.69 m (5 ft 7 in)
- Position: Defender

Team information
- Current team: Valencia
- Number: 20

Senior career*
Years	Team	Apps	(Gls)
2012–2013	Atlético Madrid C		
2013–2017	Atlético Madrid	2	(0)
2017–2018	Fundación Albacete	28	(0)
2018–2019	Madrid CFF	26	(0)
2019–2021	Deportivo La Coruña	49	(0)
2021–	Valencia	3	(0)
- * Club domestic league appearances and goals as of 21:01, 7 December 2021 (UTC)

Noelia Villegas Rico (born 7 January 1996) is a Spanish footballer who plays as a defender for Valencia.

== Club career ==
Villegas started her career at Atlético Madrid C.
