= Amanda Sampedro =

Spanish footballer (born 1993)

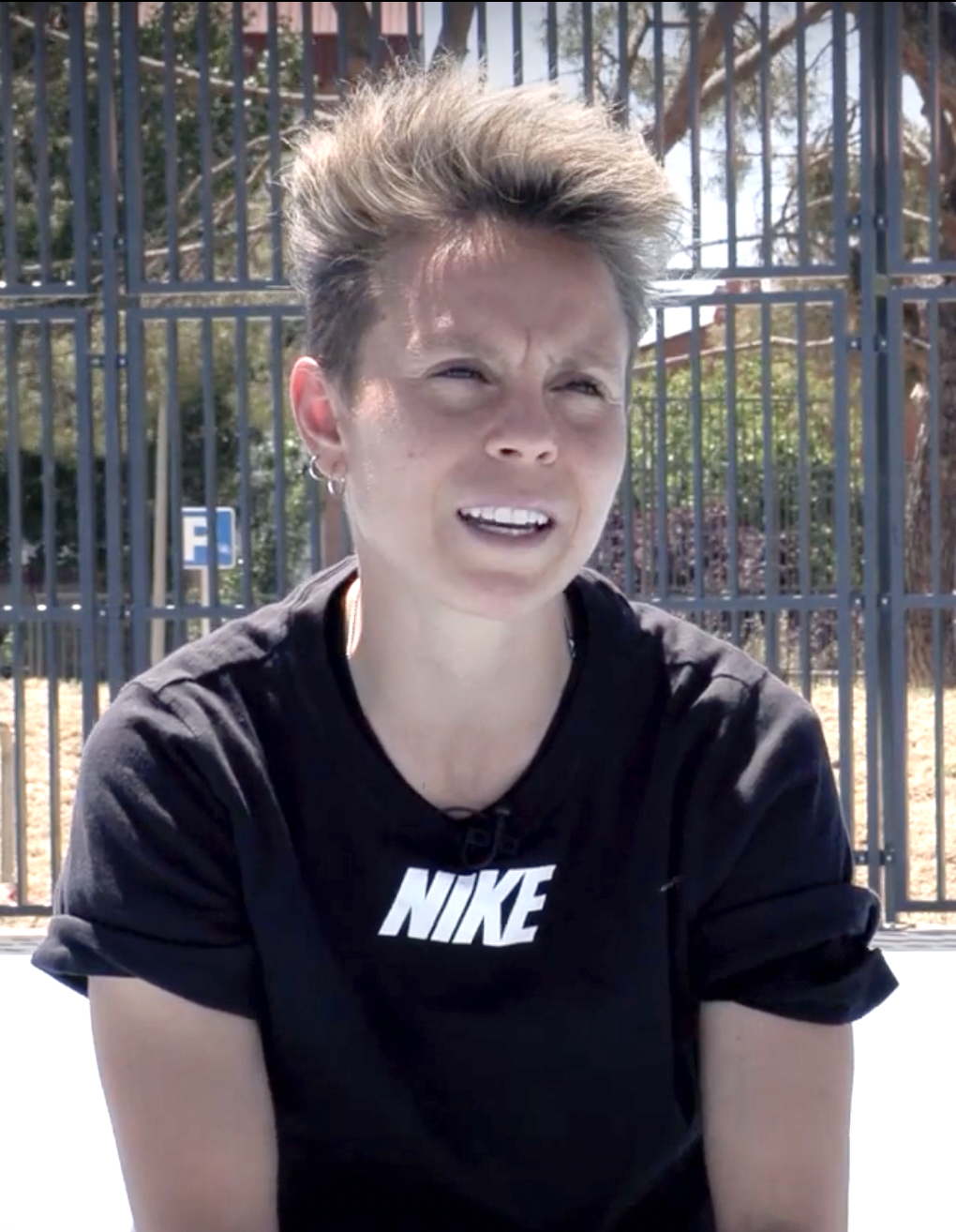
- Sampedro in 2021

Personal information
- Full name: Amanda Sampedro Bustos
- Date of birth: 26 June 1993 (age 33)
- Place of birth: Madrid, Spain
- Height: 1.62 m (5 ft 4 in)
- Position: Midfielder

Youth career
- Atlético Madrid

Senior career*
Years	Team	Apps	(Gls)
2007–2022	Atlético Madrid	385	(77)
2022–2024	Sevilla FC	57	(4)

International career^{‡}
2009–2011	Spain U17	21	(8)
2011–2012	Spain U19	19	(4)
2015–2023	Spain	53	(11)
- * Club domestic league appearances and goals as of 17 January 2021 ‡ National team caps and goals as of 25 October 2020

Amanda Sampedro Bustos (born 26 June 1993) is a Spanish former footballer who played as a Midfielder for Atlético Madrid, Sevilla FC, and the Spain national team.

== International career ==
She was part of the Spanish team which won the 2010 UEFA U-17 Women's Championship and finished third at the subsequent 2010 FIFA U-17 Women's World Cup.

In 2012, Sampedro was captain of the Spain team which reached the final of the 2012 UEFA Women's U-19 Championship, where they were beaten 1–0 by Sweden after extra time. After the competition, UEFA named her among ten "emerging talents".

In September 2012, Sampedro was called up to the senior national squad for the first time, ahead of a UEFA Women's Euro 2013 qualifying match with Romania. In June 2013, national team coach Ignacio Quereda called Sampedro up to his 23-player squad for the UEFA Women's Euro 2013 finals in Sweden. She was also part of Spain's squad at the 2015 FIFA Women's World Cup in Canada.

in July 2024, Atletico Madrid announced her retirement from professional football.

=== International goals ===
#	Date	Venue	Opponent	Score	Result	Competition
1.	18 September 2015	Sports Center, Weinan	China	1–2	1–3	Friendly
2.	21 September 2015	Sports Center, Chenzhou	China	1–1	1–2	Friendly
3.	29 January 2016	Stadion pod Malim brdom, Petrovac	Montenegro	0–6	0–7	UEFA Women's Euro 2017 qualifying
4.	8 April 2016	Complexo Desportivo da Covilhã, Covilhã	Portugal	1–3	1–4	UEFA Women's Euro 2017 qualifying
5.	15 September 2016	La Ciudad del Fútbol, Las Rozas de Madrid	Montenegro	4–0	13–0	UEFA Women's Euro 2017 qualifying
6.	20 September 2016	Butarque, Leganés	Finland	4–0	5–0	UEFA Women's Euro 2017 qualifying
7.	30 June 2017	Pinatar Arena, San Pedro del Pinatar	Belgium	5–0	7–0	Friendly
8.	19 July 2017	De Vijverberg, Doetinchem	Portugal	2–0	2–0	UEFA Women's Euro 2017
9.	23 October 2017	Ramat Gan Stadium, Ramat Gan	Israel	0–6	0–6	2019 FIFA Women's World Cup qualification
10.	7 March 2018	AEK Arena – Georgios Karapatakis, Larnaca	Italy	0–1	0–2	2018 Cyprus Women's Cup
11.	4 September 2018	Las Gaunas, Logroño	Serbia	2–0	3–0	2019 FIFA Women's World Cup qualification

== Personal life ==
In March 2013 Sampedro was in the second year of a sports journalism course at King Juan Carlos University (URJC). She had also studied physiotherapy, nutrition, and sports management. In a March 2020 interview, Sampedro stated that she viewed Olympians Mireya Belmonte and Carolina Marín as her role models while growing up.

== Honours ==
=== Club ===
- Primera División: 2016–17, 2017–18, 2018–19
- Copa de la Reina: 2016
- Supercopa de España: 2020–21

=== International ===
Spain

- UEFA Women's Under-17 Championship: Winner 2010
- Algarve Cup: 2017
- Cyprus Cup: Winner, 2018
