= 2020–21 Supercopa de España Femenina =

2020–21 Supercopa de España
Spanish Women's Super Cup

Tournament details
- Host country: Spain
- City: Almería
- Dates: 12–16 January 2021
- Teams: 4

Final positions
- Champions: Atlético Madrid (1st title)
- Runners-up: Levante

Tournament statistics
- Matches played: 3
- Goals scored: 9 (3 per match)
- Top scorer(s): Ajara Nchout (2 goals)
- Best player: Laia Aleixandri (Atlético Madrid)

The 2020–21 Supercopa de España Femenina was the second edition of the current Supercopa de España Femenina, an annual women's football competition for clubs in the Spanish football league system that were successful in its major competitions in the preceding season.

The competition was held in Almería. Atlético Madrid won their first title after defeating Levante 3–0 in the final.

== Draw ==
The draw for the competition was held on 17 December 2020.

== Qualification ==
The competition featured both finalists of the 2019–20 Copa de la Reina, as well as the highest-ranked clubs at the 2019–20 Primera División that had not already qualified through the cup final.

=== Qualified teams ===
The following four teams qualified for the tournament.

Team	Method of qualification
Atlético Madrid	2019–20 Primera División runners-up (Note: The RSFF announced the premature end of the 2019–20 Primera División season due to the COVID-19 pandemic with the positions of the clubs at the time of the abandonment declared final.)
Barcelona	2019–20 Primera División champions and 2019–20 Copa de la Reina finalists
Levante	2019–20 Primera División third place
Logroño	2019–20 Copa de la Reina finalists

== Matches ==
All matches were played at the Estadio de los Juegos Mediterráneos in Almería.

=== Bracket ===
Semi-finals
12 January 2021
Levante	3
Logroño	1
13 January 2021
Atlético Madrid (a.e.t.) (p)	1 (3)
Barcelona	1 (1)

Final
16 January 2021
Levante	0
Atlético Madrid	3

=== Semi-finals ===
12 January 2021
19:00

Levante	3–1	Logroño
Esther 34'; Navarro 60'; Andonova 73'	Report	Jade 28'

Estadio de los Juegos Mediterráneos, Almería
Attendance: 0 (Note: All matches were played behind closed doors due to the COVID-19 pandemic.)
Referee: Ainara Andrea Acevedo Dudley

13 January 2021
19:00

Atlético Madrid	1–1 (a.e.t.)	Barcelona
Van Dongen 67' (pen.)	Report	Putellas 90'
Penalties
Diallo (penalty missed); Castellanos (penalty scored); Van Dongen (penalty missed); Laurent (penalty scored); Guagni (penalty scored)	3–1	(penalty missed) Hermoso; (penalty missed) Caldentey; (penalty missed) Serrano; (penalty scored) Torrejón

Estadio de los Juegos Mediterráneos, Almería
Attendance: 0
Referee: Olatz Rivera Olmedo

=== Final ===
16 January 2021
20:45

Levante	0–3	Atlético Madrid
	Report	Castellanos 18'; Nchout 22', 32'

Estadio de los Juegos Mediterráneos, Almería
Attendance: 0
Referee: Marta Frías Acedo

Levante	Atlético Madrid

GK	13	(Romania) Andreea Părăluță
DF	4	(Spain) María Méndez
DF	5	(Spain) Rocío Gálvez
DF	16	(Brazil) Jucinara
MF	6	(France) Sandie Toletti
MF	8	(Spain) Irene Guerrero	(substituted off) 63'
MF	12	(Spain) Claudia Zornoza
MF	17	(Spain) Alharilla	(substituted off) 88'
FW	18	(Spain) Eva Navarro	(substituted off) 83'
FW	19	(Spain) Esther
FW	9	(North Macedonia) Nataša Andonova	(substituted off) 62'
Substitutes:
GK	1	(Spain) María
DF	7	(Spain) Lucía	(substituted in) 88'
DF	20	(Spain) Paula Tomás
DF	21	(Argentina) Aldana Cometti	(substituted in) 83'
MF	10	(Argentina) Estefanía Banini	(substituted in) 63'
FW	11	(Spain) Alba Redondo	(substituted in) 62'
MF	24	(Spain) Silvia Lloris
FW	29	(Spain) Andrea Okene
FW	30	(Spain) Fiamma Iannuzzi
Manager:
(Spain) María Pry

GK	1	(Sweden) Hedvig Lindahl
DF	5	(Netherlands) Merel van Dongen
DF	4	(Spain) Laia Aleixandri
DF	3	(Italy) Alia Guagni	(substituted off) 81'
DF	19	(France) Aïssatou Tounkara
MF	10	(Spain) Amanda Sampedro	(substituted off) 46'
MF	15	(Spain) Silvia Meseguer
MF	20	(Colombia) Leicy Santos	(substituted off) 57'
FW	6	(Venezuela) Deyna Castellanos	(substituted off) 68'
FW	8	(Brazil) Ludmila
FW	29	(Cameroon) Ajara Nchout	(substituted off) 82' (yellow card) 69'
Substitutes:
GK	13	(France) Pauline Peyraud-Magnin
DF	2	(France) Grâce Kazadi	(substituted in) 81'
MF	7	(Germany) Turid Knaak	(substituted in) 46'
MF	16	(Nigeria) Rasheedat Ajibade	(substituted in) 82'
MF	17	(France) Aminata Diallo	(substituted in) 57' (yellow card) 59'
FW	18	(England) Toni Duggan	(substituted in) 68'
FW	21	(France) Emelyne Laurent
DF	23	(Spain) Alejandra Bernabé
DF	26	(Spain) Sonia García
Manager:
(Spain) José Luis Sánchez Vera

== See also ==
- 2020–21 Primera División
- 2020–21 Copa de la Reina
