= Andrea Okene =

Spanish footballer (born 2001)

Personal information
- Date of birth: November 30, 2001 (age 23)
- Place of birth: Valencia, Spain

Andrea Okene Bañón (Born 30 November 2001) is a Spanish footballer who plays as a forward for Valencia. She is a product of the Levante UD youth system. She debuted in the Primera División in April 2021. In July 2021, she joined Valencia as the sixth signing of the 21-22 season. She was born from a Nigerian father and a Spanish mother.
