= Xènia Pérez =

Spanish footballer (born 2001)

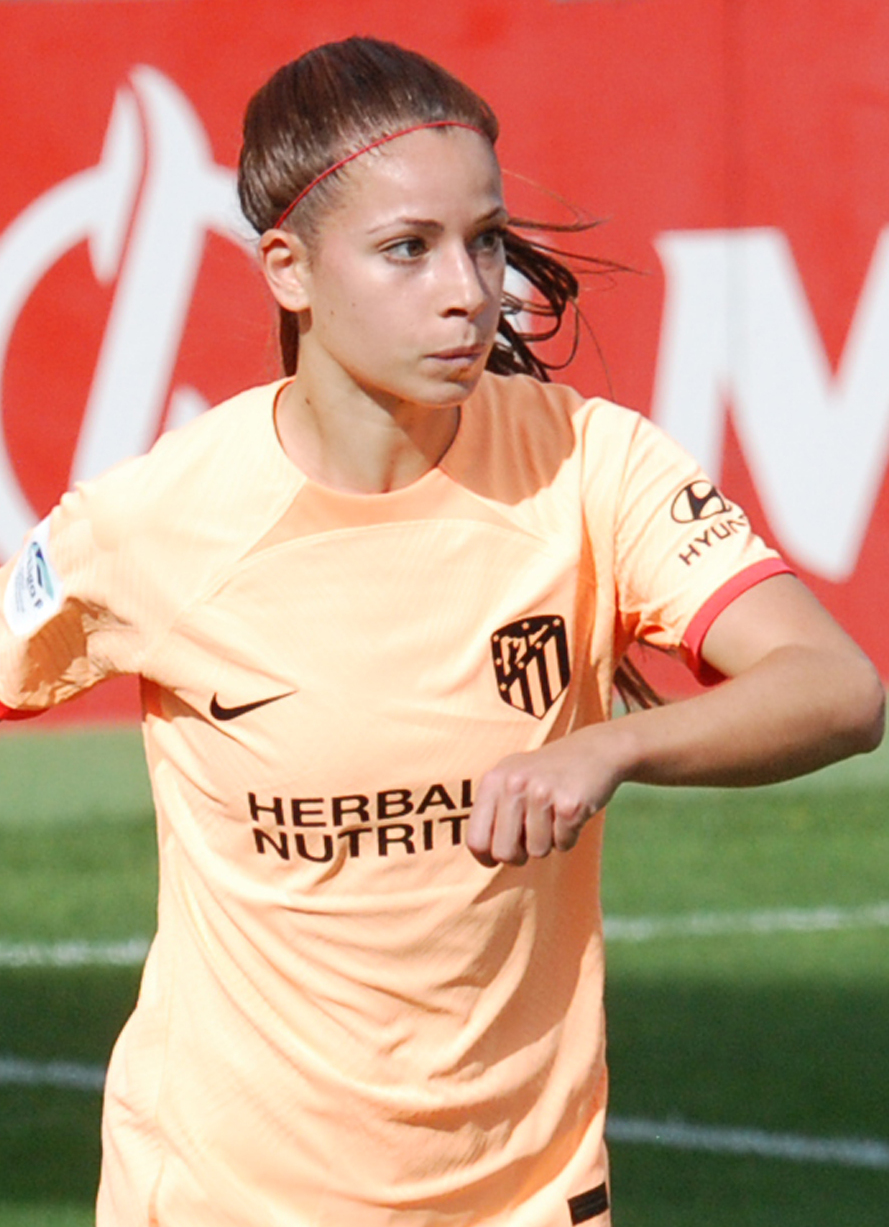
- Pérez with Atlético Madrid in 2022

Personal information
- Full name: Xènia Pérez Almiñana
- Date of birth: 28 October 2001 (age 25)
- Place of birth: Sitges, Spain
- Height: 1.71 m (5 ft 7 in)
- Position: Centre-back

Team information
- Current team: Atlético Madrid
- Number: 5

Youth career
- 2014–2018: RCD Espanyol

Senior career*
Years	Team	Apps	(Gls)
2019–2022	RCD Espanyol	54	(5)
2022–	Atlético Madrid	76	(3)

International career^{‡}
2024	Spain U23	1	(0)
- * Club domestic league appearances and goals as of 30 August 2026 ‡ National team caps and goals as of 4 July 2025

Xènia Pérez Almiñana (born 28 October 2001) is a Spanish professional footballer who plays as a centre-back for Liga F club Atlético Madrid. She has previously played for RCD Espanyol.

== Youth career ==
Pérez started playing football at the age of 4. In 2014, she joined the Espanyol youth program before going on to ascend to Espanyol's reserve team and multiple Catalonian youth teams over the following years. In 2018 and 2019, Pérez started to make forays into the Espanyol first team. She eventually made her debut at age 18, playing stoppage time minutes in a 4–0 loss to Barcelona on 14 December 2019.

== Club career ==
=== RCD Espanyol ===
Pérez officially joined the senior team ahead of the 2020–21 season. She played regularly, making 23 league appearances. However, Espanyol was relegated as consequence for finishing in 16th place on the Primera División table.

In her first season in the Spanish second division, Pérez took a starring role in Espnayol's squad. She was selected as a team captain and appeared in every league match of the season. She also scored her first two professional goals in an October match against AEM, helping Espanyol execute a comeback and win the match, 3–2. Ultimately, while the team came close to promotion, a convincing defeat against Levante Las Planas on the final day of the season prevented such result.

=== Atlético Madrid ===
Ahead of the 2022–23 Liga F season, Pérez returned to the Spanish first division and signed a three-year contract with Atlético Madrid. She made her club debut on 17 September 2022, coming in as a second-half substitute in a match against Sevilla FC. In her first season with Atlético, Pérez played a total of 432 minutes and started only 5 matches. She was also involved as the team won the Copa de la Reina final, beating Real Madrid on penalties.

Her struggle for playing time continued into 2023, and she considered leaving the club during the summer in search of other opportunities. However, following the departure of Merel van Dongen, Pérez rose to a starting position in the squad. She helped Atlético finish 3rd in the Liga F standings and secure a spot in the 2024–25 Champions League qualifying rounds.

Pérez continued her positive momentum into the 2024–25 season, in which she was one of Atlético's leaders in minutes and captained the team on several occasions. She also ended up renewing her contract for two more seasons in Madrid. Atlético finished 3rd in the standings for the second straight campaign, giving them another chance in the Champions League. Pérez also helped her team reach the Copa de la Reina final, where they were beaten by Barcelona after Claudia Pina scored a brace.

At the beginning 2025–26 campaign, Pérez received less playing time than she would have desired. However, she gained minutes as time went on and ended up registering 12 consecutive 90-minute performances to round out the season. She contributed to Atlético Madrid's journey yet another Copa de la Reina final, which ended as a loss to Barcelona for the second year in a row. Pérez also helped the team reach the knockout phase play-offs of the UEFA Champions League, where they were eliminated 5–0 on aggregate by Manchester United; in the second leg of the tie, she received a red card in the final minutes of the match after committing a second bookable offense.

Pérez recorded her 100th game with Atlético Madrid on 30 August 2026, participating in a match against rivals Real Madrid.

== International career ==
Pérez received her first youth international call-up in February 2024, joining the Spanish under-23 squad after Lucía Pardo withdrew with an injury. On 2 December 2024, she made her U-23 debut in a 3–2 victory over France.

== Career statistics ==
=== Club ===
As of 4 July 2025

Appearances and goals by club, season and competition
Club	Season	League			National Cup (Note: Includes the Copa de la Reina and Supercopa de España)		Continental (Note: Inclues the UEFA Women's Champions League)		Total	
Club	Season	Division	Apps	Goals	Apps	Goals	Apps	Goals	Apps	Goals
RCD Espanyol	2019–20	Primera División	1	0	1	0	—		2	0
RCD Espanyol	2020–21	Primera División	23	0	—		—		23	0
RCD Espanyol	2021–22	Primera Federación	30	5	4	0	—		34	5
RCD Espanyol	Total		54	5	5	0	0	0	59	5
Atlético Madrid	2022–23	Liga F	12	0	1	0	—		13	0
Atlético Madrid	2023–24	Liga F	21	2	1	0	—		22	2
Atlético Madrid	2024–25	Liga F	19	0	6	0	2	0	27	0
Atlético Madrid	Total		52	2	8	0	2	0	62	2
Career total			106	7	13	0	2	0	120	7

== Honours ==
Atlético Madrid

- Copa de la Reina: 2022–23
