= Rosa Otermín =

Spanish footballer (born 2000)

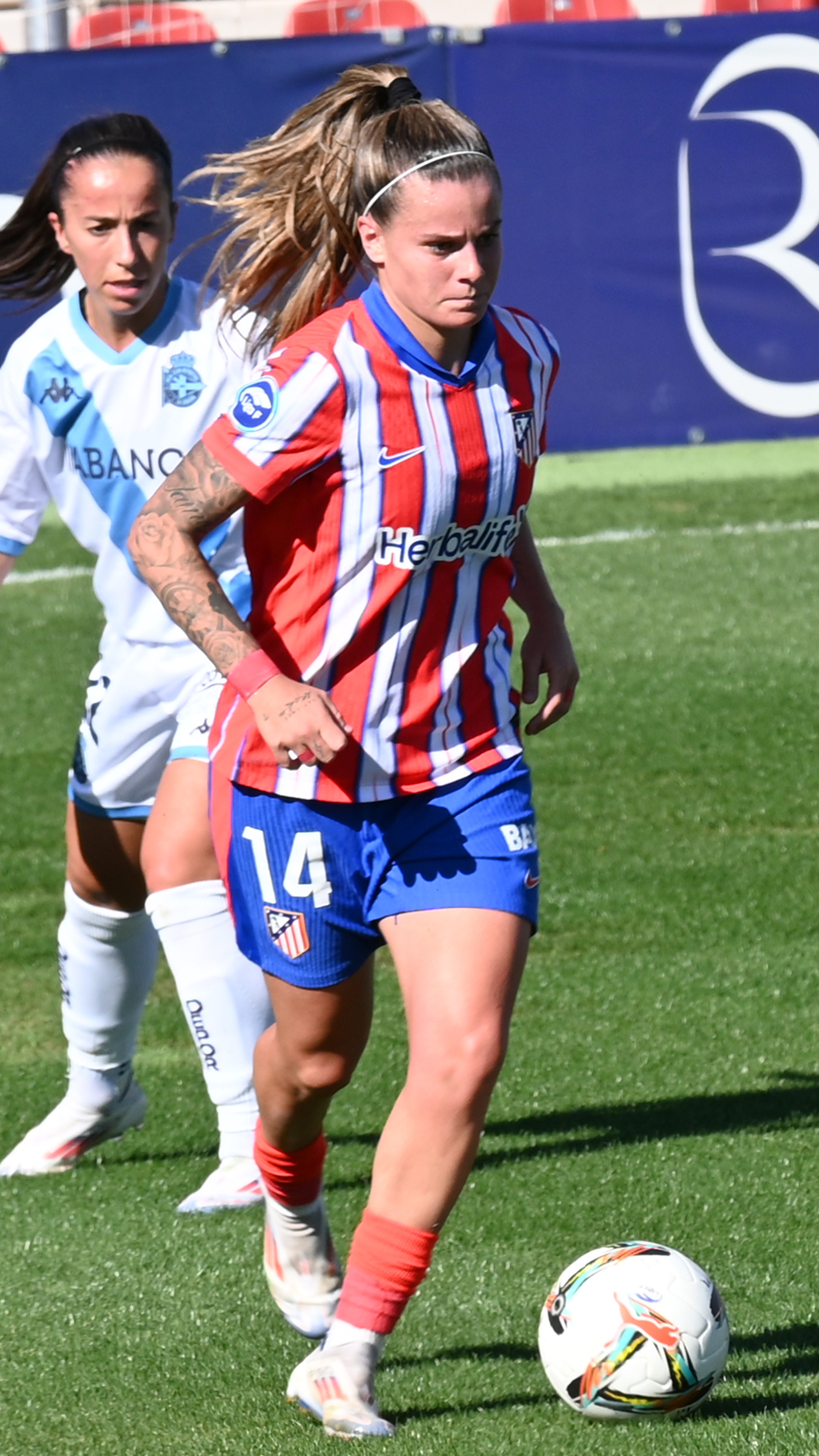
- Rosa Otermín in 2024

Personal information
- Full name: Rosa Otermín Abella
- Date of birth: 2 October 2000 (age 26)
- Place of birth: Alcorcón, Spain
- Height: 1.67 m (5 ft 6 in)
- Position: Left back

Team information
- Current team: Atlético Madrid
- Number: 11

Senior career*
Years	Team	Apps	(Gls)
2014–2015	EMF Fuensalida		
2015–2016	Atlético Madrid C		
2016–2019	Atlético Madrid B		
2017–2019	Atlético Madrid	4	(0)
2019–2021	Real Betis	43	(4)
2021–2024	Sevilla	75	(6)
2024–	Atlético Madrid	33	(4)

International career
- Spain U19
Medal record
Representing Spain
UEFA Women's Under-19 Championship
First place	2018 Switzerland
- * Club domestic league appearances and goals as of 02:10, 23 December 2025 (UTC)

Rosa Otermín Abella (born 2 October 2000) is a Spanish professional footballer who plays as a defender for Liga F club Atlético Madrid.

== Club career ==
Otermín started her career at EMF Fuensalida.
