= Siobhan Wilson =

Jamaican footballer (born 1994)

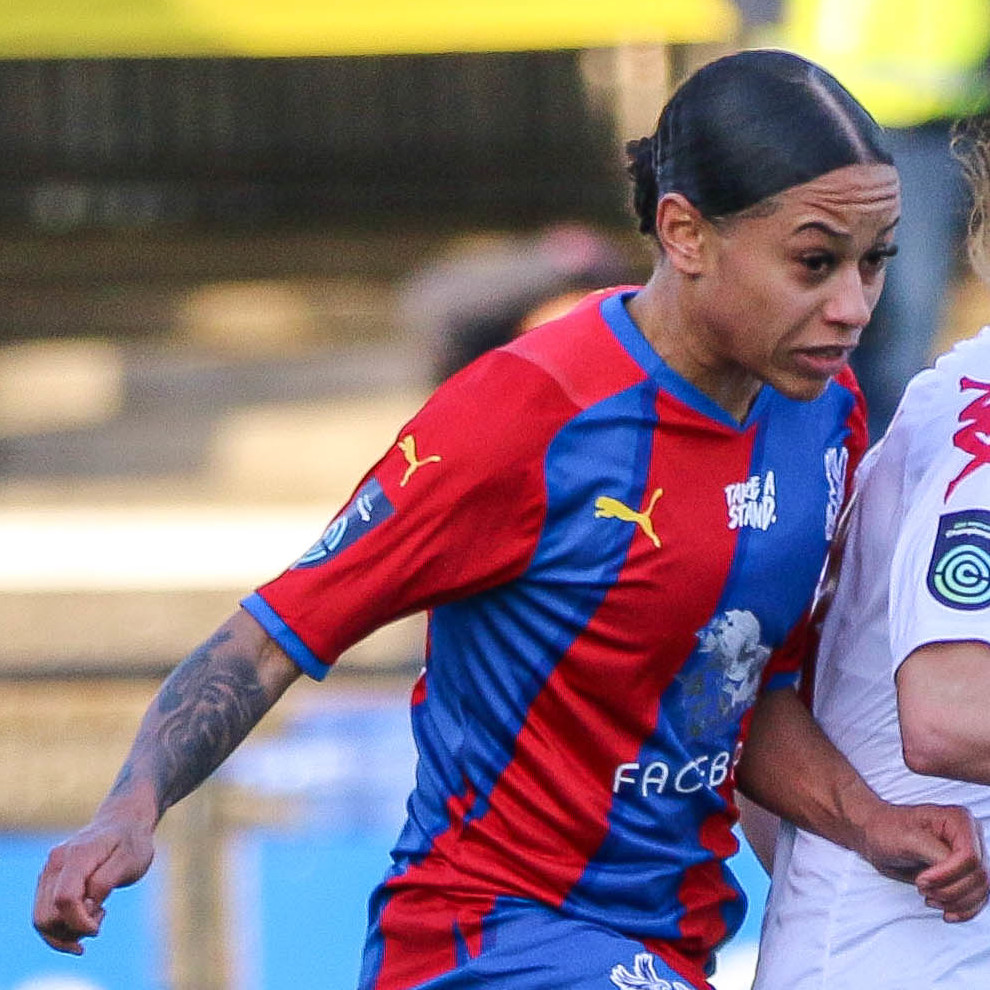
- Wilson with Crystal Palace in January 2022

Personal information
- Full name: Siobhan Marie Wilson
- Date of birth: 17 May 1994 (age 32)
- Place of birth: London, England
- Height: 1.63 m (5 ft 4 in)
- Position: Defender

Team information
- Current team: [Southampton W. F. C]
- Number: 14

College career
Years	Team	Apps	(Gls)
2013–2014	Hutchinson Blue Dragons	34	(14)
2015	Clayton State Lakers	17	(2)
2016–2017	Georgia State Panthers	9	(1)

Senior career*
Years	Team	Apps	(Gls)
2018	Málaga	5	(0)
2019	Sassuolo	2	(0)
2019	Charlton Athletic	5	(0)
2020–2022	Crystal Palace	38	(6)
2022–	Birmingham City	27	(2)
2025	Southampton (loan)	0	(0)

International career^{‡}
2022–	Jamaica	3	(0)
- * Club domestic league appearances and goals as of 11 May 2023 ‡ National team caps and goals as of 13 November 2022

Siobhan Marie Wilson (born 17 May 1994), also known as Shiv Wilson or just Shiv, is a former professional footballer who last played as a defender for Birmingham City. Born and raised in England to a British Jamaican father, she is capped for the Jamaica women's national team.

== Early life ==
Wilson was born to Clive and Lynn Wilson. Her father is a former footballer who played for Manchester City, Chelsea, Queens Park Rangers and Tottenham Hotspur.

== International career ==
Wilson was eligible to play for the Jamaica women's national football team through her paternal grandparents. She made her senior international debut in 2022.
