= María José Pons =

Spanish footballer (born 1984)

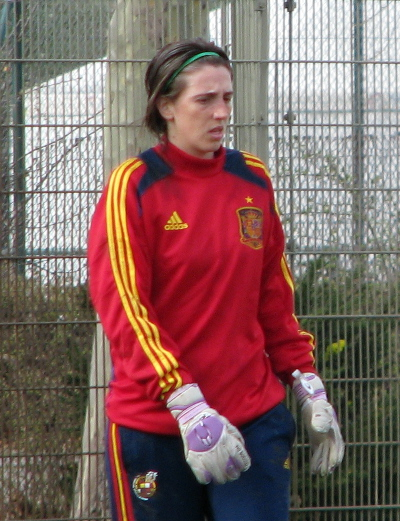

Personal information
- Full name: María José Pons Gómez
- Date of birth: 8 August 1984 (age 42)
- Place of birth: Sabadell, Spain
- Height: 1.73 m (5 ft 8 in)
- Position: Goalkeeper

Senior career*
Years	Team	Apps	(Gls)
1999–2003	Sabadell		
2003–2005	Barcelona		
2005–2009	Levante		
2009–2013	Espanyol		
2013–2015	Valencia	54	(0)
2015–2017	Sabadell		
2017	Zaragoza CFF	8	(0)
2017–2020	Espanyol	32	(0)

International career
2012–2013	Spain	5	(0)
2003–2019	Catalonia	4	(0)
- * Club domestic league appearances and goals as of 14 April 2019

María José Pons Gómez (born 8 August 1984), commonly known as Mariajo, is a Spanish former footballer who played as a goalkeeper.

She previously played for CD Sabadell, FC Barcelona, Levante UD, with whom she won one League and one Cup, and Valencia. She was a key player in the league success, conceding nine goals in 25 matches. She had previously won the 2003 Cup with CE Sabadell. During her four seasons with Espanyol (2009–2013) she added two further Cup winner's medals to her collection.

== Career ==
She is a member of the Spain women's national football team, where she is a reserve goalkeeper as of the 2013 European Championship qualifying. When regular custodian Ainhoa Tirapu was injured, Mariajo stood in for qualifying games against Switzerland and Turkey.

== International career ==
In June 2013, national team coach Ignacio Quereda confirmed Mariajo as a member of his 23-player squad for the UEFA Women's Euro 2013 finals in Sweden.

== Titles ==
- 1 Spanish League (2008)
- 4 Spanish Cups (2003, 2007, 2010, 2012)
