= Pauleta (footballer, born 1998) =

Spanish footballer

Personal information
- Full name: Paula Sancho González
- Date of birth: 12 June 1998 (age 28)
- Place of birth: Sagunto, Spain
- Height: 1.61 m (5 ft 3 in)
- Position: Midfielder

Team information
- Current team: Valencia
- Number: 14

Youth career
- 2009–2013: Mare Nostrum

Senior career*
Years	Team	Apps	(Gls)
2013–2018	Valencia	27	(0)
2018–2021	Fundación Albacete	49	(10)
2021–2022	Rayo Vallecano	11	(2)
2022–	Valencia		
- * Club domestic league appearances and goals as of 12:45, 28 November 2021 (UTC)

Paula Sancho González (born 12 June 1998), most commonly known as Pauleta, is a Spanish footballer who plays as a midfielder for Valencia.

== Club career ==
Pauleta started her career at Mare Nostrum's academy.
