= Ayaka Noguchi =

Japanese footballer

Personal information
- Date of birth: 25 October 1995 (age 31)
- Place of birth: Saitama Prefecture, Japan
- Height: 1.65 m (5 ft 5 in)
- Position: Midfielder

Team information
- Current team: Sporting de Huelva
- Number: 23

Senior career*
Years	Team	Apps	(Gls)
- Omiya Ardija Ventus
2023–2024	Deportivo La Coruña		
2024–	Sporting de Huelva		
- * Club domestic league appearances and goals

Ayaka Noguchi (born 25 October 1995) is a Japanese professional footballer who plays as a midfielder for Sporting de Huelva.

== Club career ==
Noguchi made her WE League debut on 12 September 2021.
