= Jennifer Vreugdenhil =

Dutch footballer

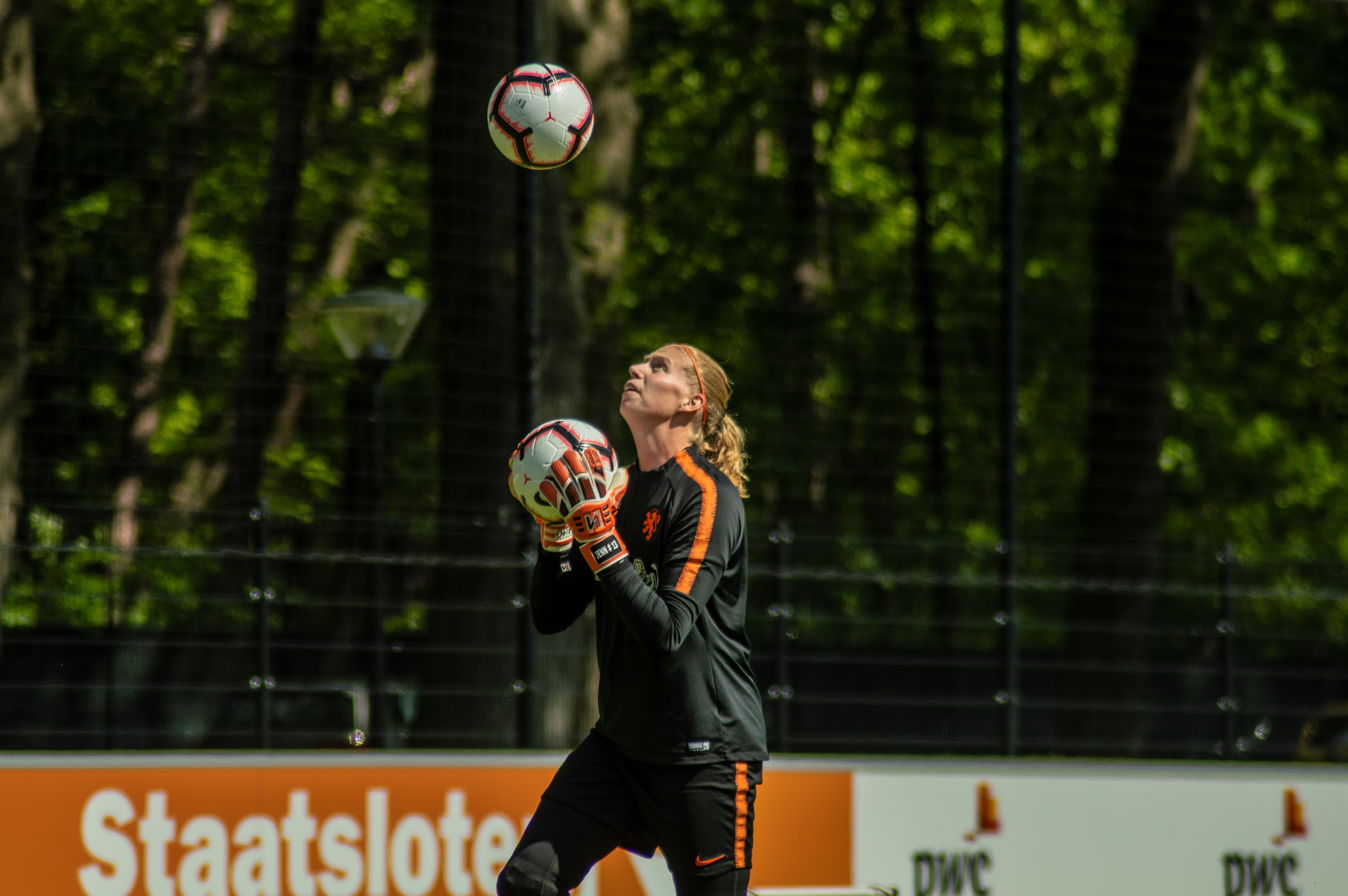
- Vreugdenhil in 2019

Personal information
- Date of birth: 12 January 1995 (age 31)
- Place of birth: Oosterhout, Netherlands
- Height: 1.79 m (5 ft 10 in)
- Position: Goalkeeper

Senior career*
| Years | Team | Apps | (Gls) |
| 2012–2017 | ADO Den Haag | 74 | (0) |
| 2017–2020 | Valencia | 68 | (0) |
| Total | | 142 | (0) |

International career
| 2010 | Netherlands U15 | 3 | (0) |
| 2010–2011 | Netherlands U16 | 6 | (0) |
| 2010–2012 | Netherlands U17 | 8 | (0) |
| 2012–2014 | Netherlands U19 | 19 | (0) |
| 2019 | Netherlands U23 | 3 | (0) |
| 2018 | Netherlands | 1 | (0) |
Medal record
Women's football
Representing Netherlands
UEFA Women's Under-19 Championship
| Winner | 2014 Norway |
- * Club domestic league appearances and goals

Jennifer Vreugdenhil (born 12 January 1995) is a Dutch former professional footballer who played as a goalkeeper.

Vreugdenhil played for ADO Den Haag and Valencia at club level and was capped by the Netherlands national team. She retired from professional football in August 2020 at the age of 25.

== International career ==
Vreugdenhil made her senior team debut for Netherlands on 2 March 2018 in a 3–2 win against Denmark.

== Career statistics ==
=== International ===
As of match played 2 March 2018

Appearances and goals by national team and year
| National team | Year | Apps | Goals |
|---|---|---|---|
| Netherlands | 2018 | 1 | 0 |
| Total | | 1 | 0 |

== Honours ==
ADO Den Haag

- Eredivisie: 2011–12
- KNVB Women's Cup: 2011–12, 2012–13, 2015–16

Netherlands U19

- UEFA Women's Under-19 Championship: 2014

Netherlands

- Algarve Cup: 2018
