= Chloe Richards (footballer) =

English footballer (born 1994)

Personal information
- Full name: Chloe Amelia Richards
- Date of birth: 23 February 1994 (age 32)
- Place of birth: Cornwall, England
- Height: 1.73 m (5 ft 8 in)
- Position: Forward

Youth career
- 2010–2011: Truro College
- 2012: Newquay LFC

College career
Years	Team	Apps	(Gls)
2012–2015	North Alabama Lions	72	(71)

Senior career*
Years	Team	Apps	(Gls)
2017	Zaragoza	4	(0)
- * Club domestic league appearances and goals

Chloe Amelia Richards (born 23 February 1994) is an English footballer who played for Zaragoza.
