= Macarena Portales =

Spanish footballer (born 1998)

Personal information
- Full name: Macarena Portales Nieto
- Date of birth: 2 August 1998 (age 28)
- Place of birth: Madrid, Spain
- Height: 1.62 m (5 ft 4 in)
- Position: Forward

Team information
- Current team: Lazio
- Number: 11

Senior career*
Years	Team	Apps	(Gls)
2016–2017	Fundación Albacete		
2017–2018	Zaragoza	28	(3)
2018–2019	Sevilla	18	(1)
2019–2021	Madrid CFF	49	(3)
2021–2022	Inter Milan	16	(0)
2022–2024	Valencia	33	(4)
2024–2025	Levante Badalona	29	(2)
2025–2026	Atlético Madrid	16	(1)
2026–	Lazio	0	(0)

International career^{‡}
2016–2017	Spain U19	6	(1)
2024–2025	Spain	2	(0)
- * Club domestic league appearances and goals as of 02:30, 31 August 2026 (UTC) ‡ National team caps and goals as of 02:29, 2 November 2023 (UTC)

Macarena Portales Nieto (born 2 August 1998) is a Spanish professional footballer who plays as a forward for Serie A club Lazio.

== Club career ==
In 2010, at 13 years old, Portales began playing for Atlético Madrid, where she remained for five years.

Portales then made her debut playing for Fundación Albacete in 2016. The following season, she played for Zaragoza CFF, appearing in 18 games and scoring 3 goals before transferring to Sevilla FC for the 2018–19 season. While there, she played in 18 games and scored 1 goal.

Portales played for Real Madrid CF for the following two seasons, playing in 49 games and scoring 3 goals.

In 2021, Portales signed for the Italian side Inter Milan. She played in 16 games but didn't score any goals. After a season in Serie A, Portales decided to return to Spain to play for Valencia CF, signing a contract to play for two years. As of October 2023, she has played in 33 games and scored 4 goals.

== International career ==
Portales has represented Spain at various youth levels.

She played for the Spain women's national under–19 football team from 2016–17, making six appearances and scoring one goal. She competed at the UEFA U19 Women's Football Championship, where the team came in second.
