= Patricia Larqué =

Spanish footballer (born 1992)

Personal information
- Full name: Patricia Larqué Juste
- Date of birth: 2 May 1992 (age 34)
- Place of birth: Zaragoza, Spain
- Height: 1.64 m (5 ft 5 in)
- Position: Goalkeeper

Team information
- Current team: Atlético Madrid
- Number: 13

Senior career*
Years	Team	Apps	(Gls)
2008–2017	Zaragoza CFF	67	(0)
2017–2018	Santa Teresa	19	(0)
2018–2019	Zaragoza CFF		
2019–2022	Rayo Vallecano	80	(0)
2022–2023	Alavés	14	(0)
2023–2026	Atlético Madrid	0	(0)
- * Club domestic league appearances and goals as of 4 September 2023

Patricia Larqué Juste (born 2 May 1992) is a Spanish footballer who plays as a goalkeeper for Atlético Madrid currently playing in Liga F.

== Club career ==
Larqué started her career at Zaragoza CFF.
