= Eva Vamberger =

Slovenian footballer (born 1995)

Personal information
- Date of birth: 10 February 1995 (age 31)
- Place of birth: Kranj, Slovenia
- Height: 1.78 m (5 ft 10 in)
- Position: Goalkeeper

Team information
- Current team: Malečnik Maribor
- Number: 22

Senior career*
Years	Team	Apps	(Gls)
2010–2011	Velesovo	20	(0)
2011–2014	Jevnica	43	(0)
2014–2015	FSK St. Pölten	2	(0)
2015–2016	SV Neulengbach	1	(0)
2016–2017	Olimpija Ljubljana	18	(0)
2017–2018	Sporting Huelva	0	(0)
2018	Maribor	12	(0)
2019	Fundación Albacete	1	(0)
2019–2020	Koper Obala	9	(0)
2020–2021	MB Tabor	16	(0)
2021	Pomurje	12	(0)
2022–2023	Ljubljana	19	(0)
2023–2024	Gažon	0	(0)
2024–2025	MB Tabor	10	(1)
2025–2026	ŽN Maribor	20	(0)
2026	Sundby BK	0	(0)
2026–	Malečnik Maribor	0	(0)

International career
2010–2011	Slovenia U17	6	(0)
2011–2013	Slovenia U19	7	(0)
2015–2017	Slovenia	9	(0)
- * Club domestic league appearances and goals as of 3 September 2026

Eva Vamberger (born 10 February 1995) is a Slovenian footballer who plays as a goalkeeper for Malečnik Maribor.
