= Fran Sánchez =

Spanish football manager (born 1977)

Personal information
- Date of birth: 27 October 1977 (age 49)
- Place of birth: Barcelona, Spain

Managerial career
- Years: Team
- 2017–2019: FC Barcelona Femení

Fran Sánchez (born 27 October 1977) is a Spanish football manager. He managed FC Barcelona Femení. He took over the position in June 2017, replacing Xavi Llorens. His contract with the club was terminated in January 2019, after managing the club for a year and a half. He was replaced by Lluís Cortés.

== Honours ==
- Catalan Super Cup: 2017
- Copa de la Reina: 2018

Source: Official website of FC Barcelona
