= Lucía Pardo =

Spanish footballer (born 2000)

Personal information
- Full name: Lucía Pardo Méndez
- Date of birth: 5 January 2000 (age 26)
- Place of birth: Outeiro de Rei, Spain
- Position: Forward

Team information
- Current team: Real Sociedad
- Number: 18

Senior career*
Years	Team	Apps	(Gls)
2013–2014	Milagrosa		
2014–2021	Friol	43+	(21+)
2021–2022	Madrid CFF B	30	(16)
2022–2024	Madrid CFF	46	(8)
2024–2026	Real Sociedad	2	(1)

International career^{‡}
2022–	Spain U23	13	(3)
- * Club domestic league appearances and goals as of 05:21, 22 December 2023 (UTC) ‡ National team caps and goals as of 05:21, 22 December 2023 (UTC)

Lucía Pardo Méndez (born 5 January 2000) is a Spanish footballer who plays as a forward for Real Sociedad.

== Club career ==
Pardo started her career at Milagrosa.

On 30 June 2024, Real Sociedad announced that they had signed Pardo.
