= Ayaki Shinada =

Japanese footballer

Personal information
- Date of birth: 15 September 1992 (age 34)
- Place of birth: Tokyo, Japan
- Height: 1.70 m (5 ft 7 in)
- Position: Defender

College career
Years	Team	Apps	(Gls)
2011–2014	Lindsey Wilson Blue Raiders	84	(34)

Ayaki Shinada (born 15 September 1992) is a retired Japanese footballer who played for Espanyol and a variety of other football teams across Europe.

== Career ==
Ayaki Shinada began playing soccer with her older brothers and played for the boys' team in elementary school.

After graduating from high school, she attended Lindsey Wilson College in the USA. Shinada won the All Mid-South Conference First Team, Academic All Mid-South Conference, and NAIA All-American First Team while at the college. He also played for the New York Magic in the Summer League during his time there.

After graduating from college, Shinada went for open try-outs for the American women's professional soccer league, the NWSL, and was approached by Portland Thorns to join in a preseason camp, but did not sign a professional contract.

In July 2015, Shinada signed with Kungsbacka DFF of the Elitettan.

In 2016, Shinada moved to Åland United of the Kansallinen Liiga. After signing, she played 23 games and scored two goals. After the end of the contract with the team, she joined Asahi Intecc Loveledge Nagoya in the Nadeshiko League until the European transfer window started on April 8.

From May 2017, Ayaki Shinada participated tryouts with several Liga F teams until she was signed in June 2017 with RCD Espanyol.

In January 2020, Shinada left Villarreal CF, and retired.
