= Sara López (footballer) =

Spanish footballer (born 2002)

Personal information
- Full name: Sara López Suárez
- Date of birth: 16 January 2002 (age 24)
- Place of birth: Las Palmas, Spain
- Position: Midfielder

Team information
- Current team: CD Argual
- Number: 24

Senior career*
Years	Team	Apps	(Gls)
2016–2019	Femarguín		
2019–2023	Granadilla B	31+	(2+)
2020–2023	Granadilla	44	(2)
2023–2025	Real Madrid Femenino B	27	(1)
2025–	CD Argual	0	(0)
- * Club domestic league appearances and goals as of 00:35, 13 December 2021 (UTC)

Sara López Suárez (born 16 January 2002) is a Spanish footballer who plays as a midfielder for Spanish club CD Argual.

== Club career ==
López started her career at Femarguín.
