= Sheila Guijarro =

Spanish footballer (born 1996)

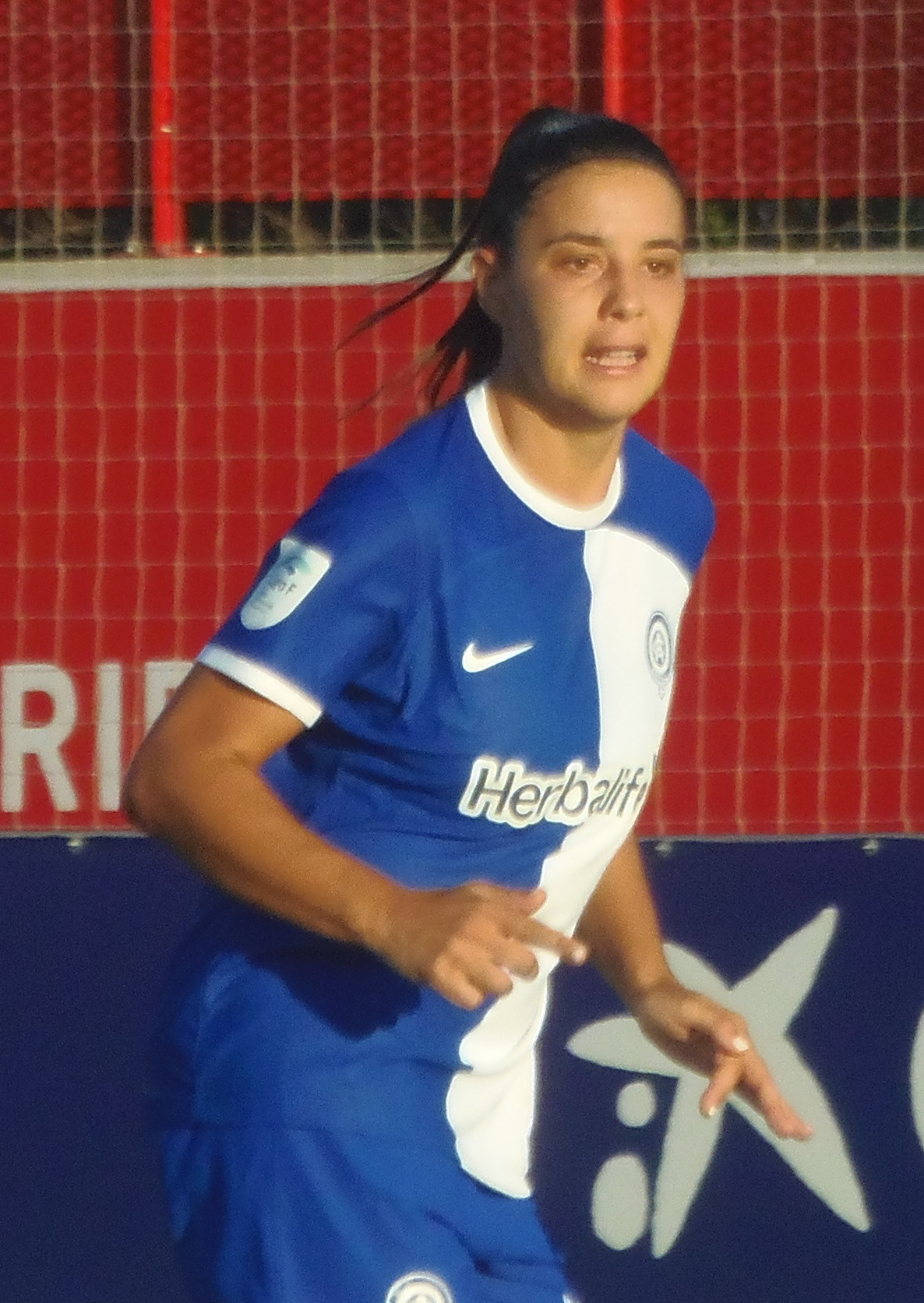
- Guijarro with Atlético Madrid in 2023

Personal information
- Full name: Sheila Guijarro Gómez
- Date of birth: 26 September 1996 (age 30)
- Place of birth: Valencia, Spain
- Height: 1.70 m (5 ft 7 in)
- Position: Forward

Senior career*
Years	Team	Apps	(Gls)
2011–2017	Levante	87	(15)
2017–2018	Málaga		
2018–2023	Villarreal	56+	(21+)
2023–2026	Atlético Madrid	63	(16)
- * Club domestic league appearances and goals as of 02:13, 23 December 2025 (UTC)

Sheila Guijarro Gómez (born 26 September 1996) is a Spanish professional footballer who plays as a forward for Liga F club Atlético Madrid.

== Club career ==
Guijarro started her career at Levante.
