= Ciudad Deportiva Rayo Vallecano =

Training ground of Rayo Vallecano

Ciudad Deportiva
- Interactive map of Ciudad Deportiva
- Location: Madrid
- Coordinates: 40.376°N 3.613°W
- Owner: Community of Madrid
- Type: Football training ground

Construction
- Opened: 2010

Tenants
- Rayo Vallecano Femenino; Rayo Vallecano (training) (2010-)

Website
- rayovallecano.es fundacionrayovallecano.es

Ciudad Deportiva Fundación Rayo Vallecano is the training ground of Rayo Vallecano. It is located in Madrid.

== Facilities ==
- Ciudad Deportiva Stadium with a capacity of 2.000 seats, is the home stadium of Rayo Vallecano B, the reserve team of Rayo Vallecano.
- 4 artificial pitches.
- 1 mini grass pitch.
- Service centre with gymnasium.
