= Ciudad Deportiva de Paterna =

Training complex of Valencia CF

Coordinates: 39°32′33.00″N 0°27′20″W

- Paterna
- Interactive map of Ciudad Deportiva de Paterna
- Location: Paterna; Valencia
- Owner: Valencia CF
- Type: Football training ground

Construction
- Built: 1992

Tenants
- Valencia CF Femenino; Valencia CF (training) (1992-)

Website
- Paterna training ground

The Ciudad Deportiva de Paterna is a state-of-the-art training complex, home to Primera Division club Valencia CF. Located in Paterna, it was opened in 1992.

The Ciudad Deportiva extends across an area of 180,000 square-metres. It is not only a school for future footballers and residence, but also a modern rehabilitation centre provided with different rooms for the recovery of footballers that are injured or in rehabilitation period.

There are several special rooms, like those for the physiotherapists, for Jacuzzi, sauna and swimming pool. The large gym, with its different and modern machines, is the perfect complement for the appropriate physical training of the footballers. On the first floor, the main building has ten rooms to lodge the footballers, as well as a living room and a dining room. The coach can play videos in order to analyse his team play and study their rival teams in the audiovisuals room. The dressing rooms for the first and second team are on the ground floor.

== Facilities ==
- Estadio Antonio Puchades with a capacity of 3,000 seats, is the home stadium of Valencia CF B, the reserve team of Valencia CF and its women's team.
- 5 grass pitches.
- 1 artificial pitch.
- 7 mini artificial pitches.
- 1 service building.
