= Valencia CF Femenino =

Spanish football club

- Full name: Valencia Club de Fútbol Femenino
- Founded: 2000 / 2009
- Ground: Ciudad Deportiva de Paterna; Valencia, Spain
- Capacity: 3,000
- President: Salvador Belda
- Head coach: Lucas Piccinato
- League: Liga F
- 2025–26: 3rd in Primera Federación (promoted)
- Website: valenciacf.com/femenino
Home colours	Away colours	Third colours

Valencia CF Femenino, previously Asociación Deportiva DSV Colegio Alemán, is a Spanish women's football team from Valencia currently playing in Spain's top league Liga F.

== History ==
A modest club founded back on 25 November 2000 within the German School in Valencia (DSV), Colegio Alemán attained promotion to the Superliga Femenina for the 2007–08 season. Both in it and the following season the team ranked third from last, narrowly avoiding relegation. On 26 May 2009 the club announced an agreement had been reached with Valencia CF to turn Colegio Aleman's teams into VCF's women section.

On 1 July María Martí represented Valencia CF Femenino at the club's new kits presentation. The refounded team debuted on September 6 with a 0–2 defeat by local powerhouse Levante UD. The team ended the first stage of the newly reformed competition second to last in the seven-team group. Classed in a less demanding group Valencia ended the second stage one spot higher, equivalent to an overall 18th position among 22 teams, with 28 points from seven wins, four draws and 13 losses.

Valencia improved significantly next year. Ending the first group in the fourth spot, just three points short of qualifying to the title contenders group, Valencia topped its group in the second stage, ending the season in an overall 10th position with 17 wins in 28 matches. With this result Valencia qualified for the Copa de la Reina for the first time in its history. They were defeated by Real Sociedad in the first round on the away goals rule.

Valencia had a bad start the following year, becoming the second team to lose the championship's first nine matches after Corderex La Antigua in 2004. In January 2012, with Valencia standing in the relegation positions with three wins and one draw in 18 matches, coach Xavi Tamarit was sacked and replaced by Cristian Toro. The team improved subsequently and won seven of the next 15 matches to secure its Primera División spot in the second to last week.

The club started to invest more in the women's section, signing internationals such as Mariajo Pons, Sara Monforte and Mari Paz Vilas, and the team moved to the top positions of the table. In the 2014–2015 season, Valencia made history by finishing the league in fourth position and qualifying for the 2015 Copa de la Reina final for the first time by defeating FC Barcelona 1–0 in the semifinal. Valencia could not take the cup, losing 2–1 in the final to Sporting de Huelva.

The following season, Cristian Toro's team would maintain the base of the previous year and the team again finished fourth, which allowed it to qualify for the Copa de la Reina. In this competition, Valencia beat UDG Tenerife 3–0 in the quarterfinals, but this could not be repeated when in the semifinals Atlético Madrid beat the black and white team 2–1 after extra time.

The 2016–2017 Primera División season became the best in the club's history to date. The 68 points achieved by the team, were close to securing UEFA Women's Champions League qualification for the first time. Ultimately they finished third. In the 2017 Copa de la Reina they initially faced Athletic Club. They won 3–1, with a double by Mari Paz Vilas and goal by Estefanía Banini. In the semifinal they fell to a 2–1 defeat by FC Barcelona.

The 2017–2018 Primera División saw a change on Valencia's bench. Cristian Toro left after five and a half years and Jesus Oliva replaced him. The team finished fifth in the leaderboard with 50 points. In the Copa de la Reina they were eliminated in the quarterfinals by Atlético Madrid. The club entrusted the position of coach to Óscar Suárez for the 2018–2019 Primera División. The team failed to match the numbers of the previous year and Suarez was sacked, with Carol Miranda ending the season. The club signed Irene Ferreras in June 2019 to start a new project. The negative results harvested (15 points out of 54 possible) ended with the dismissal of the coach in February 2020. Just as in the previous season Carol Miranda took over provisionally waiting to find a substitute.

In the 2024–25 season, they were relegated to Primera Federación for the first time since 2007.

== Players ==
=== Current squad ===
As of 3 November 2026.

Note: Flags indicate national team as defined under FIFA eligibility rules; some limited exceptions apply. Players may hold more than one non-FIFA nationality.

No.	Pos.	Nation	Player
1	GK	ESP	Jana Xin
2	DF	ESP	Sara Tamarit
3	DF	ESP	Lena Pérez
4	DF	ESP	Celia Fernández
5	DF	ESP	Nazareth Martín
6	MF	ESP	Gema Climent
7	FW	PUR	Danielle Marcano
8	MF	ESP	Carolina Marín
9	FW	FRA	Salomé Prat
10	FW	CIV	Rebecca Elloh
11	FW	ESP	Marta Mascarell

No.	Pos.	Nation	Player
12	MF	NGR	Amanda Mbadi
13	GK	ESP	Marina Llàcer
14	DF	ESP	Pauleta (captain)
15	DF	ESP	Débora García
17	FW	AND	Teresa Morató
18	DF	CHI	Camila Sáez
19	FW	ESP	Lucía Moral
20	DF	ESP	Esther Gómez
21	MF	MAR	Yasmin Mrabet
22	MF	ESP	Andrea Recio
25	GK	FRA	Alice Pinguet

=== Reserve team and Youth Academy ===
Note: Flags indicate national team as defined under FIFA eligibility rules; some limited exceptions apply. Players may hold more than one non-FIFA nationality.

No.	Pos.	Nation	Player
26	DF	ESP	Laia Alepuz
27	FW	ESP	Irene Soler
28	DF	ESP	Cristina Tormo
29	MF	ESP	Elena Sánchez
30	GK	ESP	Gemma Pastor
31	MF	ESP	Saray López
32	FW	ESP	Noa Marchena
34	DF	ESP	Diana Herrero
36	FW	ESP	Nerea Pascual
42	FW	HUN	Olivia Pethe
