= Atlético Madrid Femenino =

Spanish women's football team based in Madrid

Atlético de Madrid Femenino
- Full name: Club Atlético de Madrid
- Nicknames: Las Colchoneras (The Mattressers); Las Rojiblancas (The Red-and-Whites); Atleti
- Short name: ATM
- Founded: 2001; 25 years ago
- Stadium: Centro Deportivo Wanda; Alcalá de Henares
- Capacity: 2,700
- President: Enrique Cerezo
- Head coach: David González
- League: Liga F
- 2025–26: 5th
- Website: atleticodemadrid.com/femenino
Home colours	Away colours	Third colours

Club Atlético de Madrid Femenino (commonly known as Atlético Madrid Women or Atleti Femenino) is a Spanish women's football team based in Madrid that play in Liga F, the top tier of Spanish women's football.

== History ==
Atlético Madrid had a women's team for the first time in the late 1980s. They won the national league in 1990 and were second the following year, but just like Atlético's handball team, they were disbanded in the early 1990s. Most players joined CD Oroquieta Villaverde, which became one of Spain's leading teams.

The team was re-established in 2001 though they did not become an official section of the club until 2005. After playing three seasons in regional leagues (2004 to 2006), Atlético earned two successive promotions to reach the top tier. Quickly consolidating themselves in the top half of the table, they secured fourth place in 2009–10.

On 7 October 2015, Atlético made their UEFA Women's Champions League debut. In the round of 32, they eliminated Zorky Krasnogorsk, but in the round of 16, they were swept aside by Olympique Lyon, eventual winners of the competition. On 26 June 2016, Atlético Madrid won their first major trophy after beating FC Barcelona 3–2 in the final of the Copa de la Reina.

On 20 May 2017, Atlético achieved the title after beating Real Sociedad in the last round by 2–1. The Colchoneras ended the season without a loss.

In March 2019, the club broke the European record for attendance at a women's football match with 60,739 spectators at the Metropolitano Stadium for a league fixture, a 2–0 loss to FC Barcelona (beating a mark set a few months earlier by Athletic Bilbao, in a Copa de la Reina fixture against Atlético).

== Competition record ==
=== Atlético Villa de Madrid ===
Season	Division	Pos.	Copa de la Reina
1989–90	1	1st	
1990–91	1	2nd	Semifinals
1991–92	1	7th	

=== Atlético Féminas ===
Season	Division	Pos.	Copa de la Reina	Champions League
2001–02	1ª Regional	1st		
2002–03	Preferente	1st		
2003–04	2 (Gr. 4)	1st		
2004–05	2 (Gr. 4)	2nd		
2005–06	2 (Gr. 4)	1st		
2006–07	1	8th	Quarterfinals	
2007–08	1	7th	Semifinals	
2008–09	1	7th	Quarterfinals	
2009–10	1	4th	First round	
2010–11	1	5th	Semifinals	
2011–12	1	6th		
2012–13	1	3rd	Semifinals	
2013–14	1	3rd	Quarterfinalist	
2014–15	1	2nd	Semifinals	
2015–16	1	3rd	Champions	Round of 16

=== Club Atlético Madrid ===
Season	Division	Pos.	Copa de la Reina	Supercopa	Champions League
2016–17	1	1st	Runner-up		
2017–18	1	1st	Runner-up		Round of 32
2018–19	1	1st	Runner-up		Round of 16
2019–20	1	2nd	Round of 16	Semifinals	Quarterfinals
2020–21	1	4th	Semifinals	Champions	Round of 16
2021–22	1	4th	Round of 16	Runner-up	
2022–23	1	4th	Champions		
2023–24	1	3rd	Semifinals	Semifinals	
2024–25	1	3rd	Runner-up	Semifinals	Round 1
2025–26	1	5th	Runner-up	Semifinals	Knockout playoffs

== Honours ==
- Primera División: 4
  - 1989–90 (as Atlético Villa de Madrid), 2016–17, 2017–18, 2018–19
- Copa de la Reina: 2
  - 2015–16, 2022–23
- Supercopa de España: 1
  - 2020–21

== Players ==
=== Current squad ===
As of 30 August 2026

Note: Flags indicate national team as defined under FIFA eligibility rules; some limited exceptions apply. Players may hold more than one non-FIFA nationality.

No.	Pos.	Nation	Player
1	GK	ESP	Lola Gallardo
2	DF	ESP	Lucía Rodríguez
3	DF	ESP	Lydia Rodríguez
4	DF	BRA	Lauren
5	DF	ESP	Xènia Pérez
6	MF	ESP	Maite Zubieta
7	FW	NOR	Synne Jensen
8	DF	ESP	Silvia Lloris
9	FW	ESP	Jenni Hermoso
10	MF	ESP	Fiamma Benítez
11	DF	ESP	Rosa Otermín
12	MF	DEN	Kathrine Møller Kühl

No.	Pos.	Nation	Player
13	GK	CRC	Génesis Pérez
14	MF	ESP	Natalia Peñalvo
16	FW	ESP	Celia Segura (on loan from Barcelona)
17	DF	SRB	Allegra Poljak
18	FW	BRA	Gio Garbelini
19	DF	SUI	Viola Calligaris
20	FW	ESP	Amaiur Sarriegi
21	MF	HUN	Henrietta Csiszár
22	FW	BRA	Luany
23	DF	ESP	Alexia Fernández
32	DF	ESP	Laura Tanarro

=== From reserve team ===
Note: Flags indicate national team as defined under FIFA eligibility rules; some limited exceptions apply. Players may hold more than one non-FIFA nationality.

No.	Pos.	Nation	Player
29	DF	ESP	Naara Miranda
31	GK	ESP	Alba Bucero
33	DF	ESP	Yolanda Sierra
35	FW	ESP	Cristina Redondo
46	DF	ESP	Daniela Miñambres

=== Out on loan ===
Note: Flags indicate national team as defined under FIFA eligibility rules; some limited exceptions apply. Players may hold more than one non-FIFA nationality.

No.	Pos.	Nation	Player

=== Reserves and youth teams ===
In addition to the first team, seven other sub-teams are part of the club:

- Atlético 'B', playing in the national Primera Federación (second tier)
- Atlético 'C', playing in the national Segunda Federación (third tier)
- Atlético 'D' playing in the Madrid Regional level
- Atlético 'E' and Atlético 'F', playing in the girls' cadet (under-16) leagues in the Community of Madrid
- Atlético 'G' and Atlético 'H', playing in 7s format in the junior category of the Community of Madrid, girls under 14 years.
