= Alba (given name) =

- Gender: unisex
- Language: Spanish, Italian, Catalan, Galician

Origin
- Meaning: bright light, sunrise, "dawn"

Other names
- Related names: Dawn

Alba is a unisex given name of Latin origin meaning "white". In Spanish, Italian and Catalan the name means sunrise or "dawn". In Spanish, Italian and Catalan speaking countries it is considered to be a female name. It can also be used as a surname (as in the actress Jessica Alba) or as a title (as in the Spanish Dukedom of Alba). It may also be considered a feminine version of Albert or Albinus or of names beginning with the Germanic Alf.

Alba is also the Scottish Gaelic name for Scotland, and the alba is a subgenre of Occitan lyric poetry.

== Notable people ==
- Alba Arikha (born 1966), French-British writer
- Alba Arnova (1930–2018), Italian-Argentine ballerina and actress
- Alba August (born 1993), Danish-Swedish actress and singer
- Alba Aznar (born 1993), Spanish footballer
- Alba Baptista (born 1997), Portuguese actress
- Alba Raquel Barros (born 1952), Puerto Rican actress, comedian, and dancer
- Alba Bautista (born 2002), Spanish rhythmic gymnast
- Alba Gaïa Bellugi (born 1995), a French actress
- Alba Bouwer (1920–2010), South African journalist and author
- Alba Cabello (born 1986), Spanish synchronized swimmer
- Alba Calderón (1908–1992), Ecuadorian painter and activist
- Alba Caride (born 1980), Spanish rhythmic gymnast
- Alba Carrillo (born 1986), Spanish model and television presenter
- Alba Cerrato (born 2007), Spanish footballer
- Alba Chrétien-Vaguet (1872–1963), French operatic soprano
- Alba Marina Cotes (born 1959), Colombian chemist and biologist
- Alba D'Urbano (born 1955), Italian textile and video artist
- Alba de Céspedes (1911–1997), Cuban-Italian writer
- Alba Alonso de Quesada (1924–2020), Honduran lawyer and academic
- Alba Delgado (born 1991), Salvadoran beauty pageant titleholder
- Alba Nydia Díaz (born 1955), Puerto Rican actress
- Alba Encarnación (1956–2012), Puerto Rican teacher and community leader
- Alba Flores (born 1986), Spanish actress
- Alba Consuelo Flores (born 1965), Honduran pedagogue and civil servant
- Alba Florio (1910–2011), Italian poet
- Alba Galindo (born 1981), American-Canadian model, television host, and sportscaster
- Alba García (born 1992), Spanish actress
- Alba Gonzalo (born 1997), Spanish ice hockey goaltender
- Alba Zoe Gržin (born 1996), Croatian canoeist
- Alba Herrera y Ogazón (1885–1931), Mexican pianist, writer, journalist, and teacher
- Alba Honeywell (1821–1916), American landowner and politician
- Alba Mellado (born 1992), Spanish footballer
- Alba Leonila Méndez (born 1968), Mexican politician
- Alba Merino (born 1989), Spanish footballer
- Alba Milana (born 1959), Italian long-distance runner
- Alba Molina (born 1978), Spanish-Romani singer
- Alba Montserrat (born 1984), Spanish football goalkeeper
- Alba Mujica (1916–1983), Argentinian actress
- Alba Mbo Nchama (born 2003), Equatorial Guinean sprinter
- Alba Parietti (born 1961), Italian television presenter, television personality, showgirl, actress, and singer
- Alba Petisco (born 2003), Spanish artistic gymnast
- Alba Planas (born 2000), Spanish actress
- Alba Polo (born 2001), Spanish rhythmic gymnast
- Alba Pomares (born 1995), Spanish footballer
- Alba Lucía Potes Cortés (born 1954), Colombian composer and teacher
- Alba Quintanilla (born 1944), Venezuelan composer, harpist, harpsichordist, pianist, singer, conductor, and pedagogue
- Alba Luz Ramos (born 1949), Nicaraguan lawyer and judge
- Alba Reche (born 1997), Spanish singer-songwriter
- Alba Redondo (born 1996), Spanish footballer
- Alba Reyes (born 1981), Puerto Rican actress, model, and beauty pageant titleholder
- Alba Ribas (born 1988), Spanish actress
- Alba Rico, Spanish actress, singer, and model
- Alba Riquelme (born 1991), Paraguayan model and beauty pageant titleholder
- Alba Roballo (1908–1996), Uruguayan lawyer, poet, and politician
- Alba Rohrwacher (born 1979), Italian actress
- Alba Rojo Cama (1961–2016), Mexican sculptor
- Alba Roversi (born 1961), Venezuelan telenovela and actress
- Alba Rueda (born 1976), Argentine politician
- Alba Ruiz (born 2003), Spanish footballer
- Alba Schwartz (1857–1942), Danish writer
- Alba Sidera (born 1979), Catalan journalist and author
- Alba De Silvestro (born 1995), Italian ski mountaineer
- Alba Silvius, an ancient Roman king of Alba Longa
- Alba Solís (1927–2016), Argentine singer, actress, and vedette
- Alba Sotorra (born 1980), Spanish film director and documentary filmmaker
- Alba Spugnini (born 2000), Spanish handballer
- Alba Teruel Ribes (born 1996), Spanish racing cyclist
- Alba Torrens (born 1989), Spanish basketball player
- Alba Vázquez (born 2002), Spanish swimmer
- Alba Ventura (born 1978), Spanish pianist
- Alba Vergés (born 1978), Catalan economist and politician
- Alba Rosa Viëtor (1889–1979), Italian-American violinist and composer
- Alba Zaluar (1942–2019), Brazilian anthropologist
- Alba Larsen (born 2008), Danish racing driver

== See also ==
- Alba (surname)
- Alba (disambiguation)
