= Dawn (name) =

- Gender: Female

Origin
- Origin: Old English
- Meaning: the first appearance of light, daybreak

Other names
- Related names: Alba

Dawn is a feminine given name. It is of Old English origin, and its meaning is the first appearance of light, daybreak.

It is sometimes used as a name for Eos (Greek: Ἠώς), the Greek goddess of the dawn.

== People ==
- Dawn (Kim Hyo-jong, born 1994), South Korean rapper
- Dawn Birley (born 1977), Canadian taekwondo practitioner and actress
- Dawn Black (born 1943), politician in British Columbia, Canada
- Dawn Black (Scottish politician), Scottish politician
- Dawn Brancheau (1969–2010), SeaWorld trainer
- Dawn Butler (born 1969), British Labour Member of Parliament for Brent East
- Dawn Burrell (born 1973), American long jumper
- Dawn Cavanagh, South African women's rights activist
- Dawn Charging, American politician from North Dakota
- Dawn Crosby (1963–1996) American Singer, was the former lead singer of the underground act Détente.
- Dawn Dumont, Canadian writer
- Dawn Ellerbe (born 1974), American hammer thrower
- Dawn Evelyn Paris (1918–1993), American actress
- Dawn Fitzpatrick, American investment and financial officer
- Dawn Frank, American biologist and academic administrator
- Dawn Fraser (born 1937), Australian champion swimmer
- Dawn Freedman (born 1942), British judge
- Dawn French (born 1957), British comedian
- Dawn Hudson (born 1956), CEO of the Academy of Motion Picture Arts and Sciences.
- Dawn Kim (born 2010), American rhythmic gymnast
- Dawn King (born 1978), British playwright and screenwriter
- Dawn Langstroth (born 1979), Canadian singer/songwriter and painter
- Dawn Lake (1927–2006), Australian entertainer
- Dawnn Lewis (born 1961), American actress
- Dawn Loberg, American politician
- Dawn Lott, African-American mathematician
- Dawn Marie (born 1970), American former professional wrestler and former WWE Diva
- Dawn Mello (1931–2020), American fashion retail executive
- Dawn Moncrieffe (born 1968), Canadian athlete
- Dawn Penn (born 1952), Jamaican singer
- Dawn Porter (born 1979), British television presenter
- Dawn Powell (1896–1965), American writer of satirical novels
- Dawn Primarolo (born 1954), British Member of Parliament for Bristol South
- Dawn Olanick (1964–1982), American murder victim
- Dawn Olivieri (born 1981), American actress
- Dawn Rasmussen, retired athlete and sports administrator from Samoa
- Dawn Angelique Richard (born 1983), member of the musical girl group Danity Kane
- Dawn Robinson (born 1968), former lead singer of supergroup En Vogue and Lucy Pearl
- Dawn M. Scott (born 1973), British wildlife ecologist
- Dawn Silva (born 1954), American funk vocalist
- Dawn Staley (born 1970), American basketball player and coach
- Dawn Steel (1946–1997), American film studio executive and producer
- Dawn Stern (born 1966), American actress
- Dawn Ward (disambiguation), multiple people
- Dawn Wells (1938–2020), American actress
- Dawn Walker, Australian politician
- Dawn Zulueta (born 1969), Filipina actress

== Fictional characters ==
- Dawn Green, the second victim of the serial killer on True Blood
- Dawn Schafer, a character in The Baby-sitters Club and California Diaries
- Dawn Summers, a character in the popular television and comic book series Buffy the Vampire Slayer
- Dawn Swann, a character in the popular BBC soap opera EastEnders
- Dawn Tinsley, the receptionist in the British situation comedy The Office
- Dawn Woods, a character in the popular ITV soap opera Emmerdale

== Surname ==
- Adria Dawn, American actress
- Dolly Dawn (born Theresa Stabile, 1916–2002), American singer
- Elizabeth Dawn (born Sylvia Butterfield, 1939–2017), British actress
- Jeff Dawn, American makeup artist
- Julie Dawn (born Rosalba Juliana Mostosi, 1919–2000), English singer
- Marva Dawn (1948–2021), American theologian
- Pieretta Dawn (born 1994), English-writing Thai author

== Spacecraft ==
- Dawn (spacecraft), which is exploring 4 Vesta and later Ceres in the Asteroid belt.
