= 2016 Wildwater Canoeing World Championships =

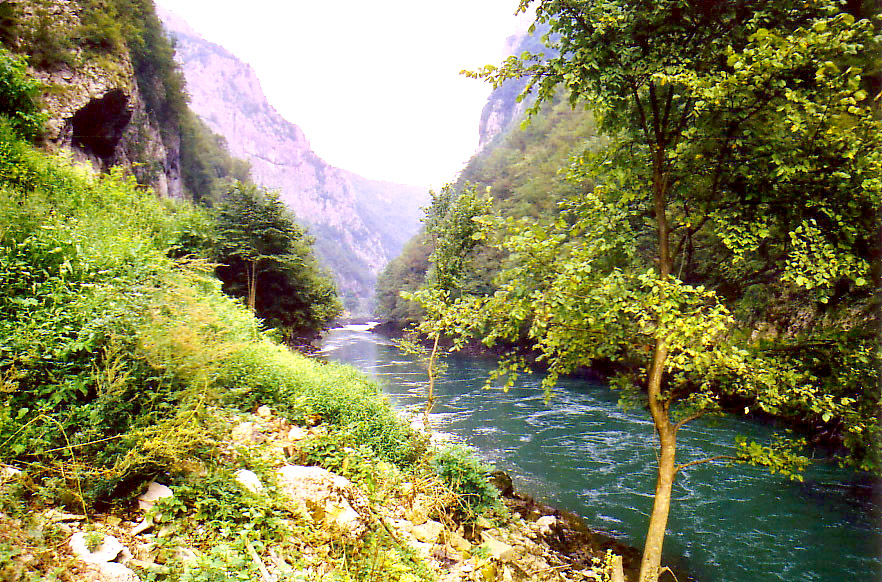
- The river Vrbas venue of the event.
- Host city: Banja Luka, Bosnia and Herzegovina
- Level: Senior
- Events: 30

The 2016 Wildwater Canoeing World Championships was the 33rd edition of the global wildwater canoeing competition, Wildwater Canoeing World Championships, organised by the International Canoe Federation.

== Results ==
=== Classic ===
==== Individual ====
===== K1 men =====
| Rank | Athlete | Country | Time |
|---|---|---|---|
| 1 | Maxime Richard | Belgium | 13:24,88 |
| 2 | Tobias Bong (Köln) | Germany | 13:27,00 |
| 3 | Remi Pete | France | 13:28,01 |
| - | - | - | - |
| 5 | Andreas Heilinger (Köln) | Germany | 13:35,84 |
| 13 | Björn Beerschwenger (Köln) | Germany | 13:59,20 |
| 39 | Yannic Lemmen (Düsseldorf) | Germany | 14:36,68 |

===== K1 women =====
| Rank | Athlete | Country | Time |
|---|---|---|---|
| 1 | Manon Hostens | France | 14:36,99 |
| 2 | Alke Overbeck (Braunschweig) | Germany | 14:48,06 |
| 3 | Costanza Bonaccorsi | Italy | 14:48,51 |
| - | - | - | - |
| 10 | Annika Gierenz (Köln) | Germany | 15:15,32 |
| 11 | Sabine Füsser (Augsburg/Siegburg) | Germany | 15:15,45 |
| 16 | Jil-Sophie Eckert (Fulda/Hamburg) | Germany | 15:56,44 |

===== C1 men =====
| Rank | Athlete | Country | Time |
|---|---|---|---|
| 1 | Emil Milihram | Croatia | 14:57,56 |
| 2 | Normen Weber (Augsburg/Brühl) | Germany | 15:03,10 |
| 3 | Ondrej Rolenc | Czech Republic | 15:09,54 |
| - | - | - | - |
| 8 | Tim Heilinger (Köln) | Germany | 15:30,26 |
| 12 | Janosch Sülzer (Brühl) | Germany | 15:42,52 |

===== C1 women =====
| Rank | Athlete | Country | Time |
|---|---|---|---|
| 1 | Anezka Paloudova | Czech Republic | 16:27,86 |
| 2 | Martina Satkova | Czech Republic | 16:31,11 |
| 3 | Sabine Eichenberger | Switzerland | 16:50,81 |
| - | - | - | - |
| 10 | Sabrina Barm (Augsburg) | Germany | 17:16,53 |

===== C2 men =====
| Rank | Athlete | Country | Time |
|---|---|---|---|
| 1 | Tony Debray / Louis Lapointe | France | 14:50,97 |
| 2 | Quentin Dazeur / Stéphane Santamaria | France | 14:54,04 |
| 3 | Peter Znidarsic / Luka Zganjar | Slovenia | 14:58,34 |
| - | - | - | - |
| 7 | Tobias Trzoska / Maik Schmitz (Bonn/Köln) | Germany | 15:05,55 |
| 8 | René Brücker / Normen Weber (Brühl/Augsburg) | Germany | 15:06,77 |

===== C2 women =====
| Rank | Athlete | Country | Time |
|---|---|---|---|
| 1 | Radka Valikova / Tereza Brozova | Czech Republic | 17:00,72 |
| 2 | Marlene Ricciardi / Valentina Razzauti | Italy | 17:06,87 |
| 3 | Barbora Kortisova / Katarina Kopunova | Slovakia | 17:15,82 |

==== Team ====
===== K1 men =====
| Rank | Country | Athlete | Time |
|---|---|---|---|
| 1 | Germany | Tobias Bong / Björn Beerschwenger / Andreas Heilinger | 13:39,46 |
| 2 | Slovenia | Nejc Znidarcic / Simon Oven / Anza Urankar | 13:43,92 |
| 3 | Belgium | Maxime Richard / Bram Sikkens / Guy De Prins | 13:56,15 |

===== K1 women =====
| Rank | Country | Athlete | Time |
|---|---|---|---|
| 1 | Czech Republic | Anezka Paloudova / Tereza Brozova / Martina Satkova | 14:55,96 |
| 2 | Germany | Alke Overbeck / Sabine Füsser / Annika Gierenz | 15:12,03 |
| 3 | France | Phenica Dupras / Marie Hostens / Claire Bren | 15:22,90 |

===== C1 men =====
| Rank | Country | Athlete | Time |
|---|---|---|---|
| 1 | Czech Republic | Ondrej Rolenc / Lukas Novosad / Vladimir Slanina | 15:10,36 |
| 2 | Germany | Tim Heilinger / Normen Weber / Janosch Sülzer | 15:13,96 |
| 3 | France | Quentin Dazeur / Stephane Santamaria / Louis Lapointe | 15:25,18 |

===== C2 men =====
| Rank | Country | Athlete | Time |
|---|---|---|---|
| 1 | Czech Republic | Filip Jelinek / Vaclav Kristek; Antonin Hales / Martin Novak; Marek Rygel / Petr Vesely | 14:58,53 |
| 2 | France | Tony Debray / Louis Lapointe; Quentin Dazeur / Stéphane Santamaria; Arthur Leduc / Léo Zouggari | 15:09,02 |
| 3 | Germany | Rene Bruecker / Normen Weber; Tobias Trzoska / Maik Schmitz; Gregor Simon / Tim Heilinger | 15:15,17 |

=== Sprint ===
==== Individual ====
===== K1 men =====
| Rank | Country | Athlete | Time |
|---|---|---|---|
| 1 | Richard Maxime | Belgium | 52,63 |
| 2 | Paul Graton | France | 53,94 |
| 3 | Vid Debeljak | Slovenia | 54,10 |
| - | - | - | - |
| 5 | Björn Beerschwenger (Köln) | Germany | 54,34 |
| 9 | Tobias Bong (Köln) | Germany | 55,11 |
| 10 | Yannic Lemmen (Düsseldorf) | Germany | 55,16 |
| 19 | Andreas Heilinger (Köln) | Germany |

===== K1 women =====
| Rank | Country | Athlete | Time |
|---|---|---|---|
| 1 | Hannah Brown | United Kingdom | 58,92 |
| 2 | Manon Hostens | France | 0:44,08 |
| 3 | Melanie Mathys | Switzerland | 59,14 |
| - | - | - | - |
| 5 | Alke Overbeck (Braunschweig) | Germany | 60,06 |
| 13 | Sabine Füsser (Augsburg/Siegburg) | Germany |
| 14 | Jil-Sophie Eckert (Fulda/Hamburg) | Germany |
| 16 | Annika Gierenz (Köln) | Germany |

===== C1 men =====
| Rank | Country | Athlete | Time |
|---|---|---|---|
| 1 | Ondrej Rolenc | Czech Republic | 58,19 |
| 2 | Normen Weber (Augsburg/Brühl) | Germany | 58,52 |
| 3 | Vladimir Slanina | Czech Republic | 58,55 |
| - | - | - | - |
| 13 | Tim Heilinger (Köln) | Germany |
| 20 | Janosch Sülzer (Brühl) | Germany |

===== C1 women =====
| Rank | Country | Athlete | Time |
|---|---|---|---|
| 1 | Martina Satkova | Czech Republic | 67,45 |
| 2 | Manon Durand | France | 68,30 |
| 3 | Cindy Coat | France | 68,93 |
| - | - | - | - |
| 8 | Sabrina Barm (Augsburg/) | Germany | 70,52 |

===== C2 men =====
| Rank | Country | Athlete | Time |
|---|---|---|---|
| 1 | Quentin Dazeur / Stephane Santamaria | France | 56,78 |
| 2 | Peter Znidarsic / Luka Zganjar | Slovenia | 57,19 |
| 3 | Tony Debray / Louis Lapointe | France | 57,56 |
-
| 6 | René Brücker / Normen Weber (Brühl/Augsburg) | Germany | 59,43 |
| 14 | Tobias Trzoska / Maik Schmitz (Bonn/Köln) | Germany |

===== C2 women =====
| Rank | Country | Athlete | Time |
|---|---|---|---|
| 1 | Barbora Kortisova / Katarina Kopunova | Slovakia | 68,63 |
| 2 | Marlene Ricciardi / Valentina Razzauti | Italy | 68,64 |
| 3 | Kristian Petrovic / Milica Kostov | Serbia | 70,29 |

==== Team ====
===== K1 men =====
| Rank | Country | Athlete | Time |
|---|---|---|---|
| 1 | Slovenia | Nejc Znidarcic; Anze Urankar; Vid Debeljak | 54,92 |
| 2 | France | Paul Graton; Gaëtan Guyonnet; Maxence Barouh | 55,15 |
| 3 | Italy | Mariano Bifano; Davide Maccagnan; Federico Urbani | 56,76 |
| 4 | Germany | Yannic Lemmen / Björn Beerschwenger / Tobias Bong | 57,33 |

===== K1 women =====
| Rank | Country | Athlete | Time |
|---|---|---|---|
| 1 | France | Claire Bren; Manon Hostens; Phénicia Dupras | 61,85 |
| 2 | Italy | Costanza Bonaccorsi; Giulia Formenton; Mathilde Rosa | 62,52 |
| 3 | Czech Republic | Anezka Paloudova; Tereza Brozova; Martina Satkova | 62,80 |
| 4 | Germany | Alke Overbeck / Sabine Füsser / Jil-Sophie Eckert | 6,3,69 |

===== C1 men =====
| Rank | Country | Athlete | Time |
|---|---|---|---|
| 1 | Czech Republic | Ondrej Rolenc; Antonin Hales; Vladimir Slanina | 60,73 |
| 2 | France | Louis Lapointe; Quentin Dazeur; Stéphane Santamaria | 61,09 |
| 3 | Croatia | Igor Gojic; Emil Milihram; Luka Obadoc | 62,67 |
| - | - | - | - |
| 6 | Germany | Normen Weber / Tim Heilinger / Janosch Sülzer | 63,40 |

===== C2 men =====
| Rank | Country | Athlete | Time |
|---|---|---|---|
| 1 | France | Tony Debray / Louis Lapointe; Quentin Dazeur / Stéphane Santamaria; Arthur Leduc / Léo Zouggari| | 59,28 |
| 2 | Croatia | Ren Korpes / Antonio Marinic; Emil Milihram / Jadran Zonjic; Luka Obadic / Ivan Tolic | 61,00 |
| 3 | Germany | Rene Bruecker / Normen Weber; Tobias Trzoska / Maik Schmitz; Gregor Simon / Tim Heilinger | 61,20 |

== See also ==
- Wildwater canoeing
