= Ivan Tolić =

Croatian canoeist

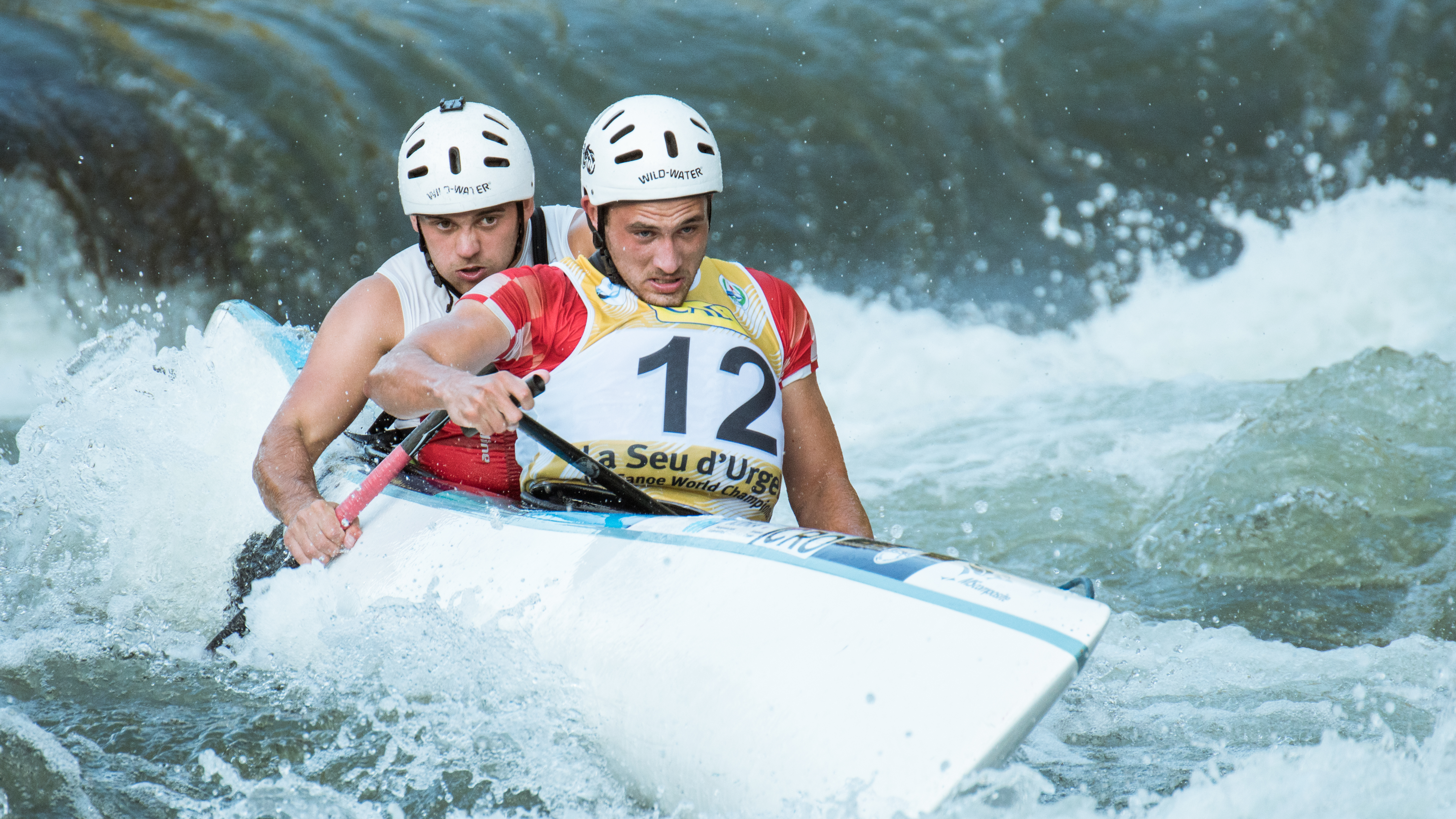
- Tolić (on the left) with Luka Obadić in 2019

Personal information
- Nationality: Croatian
- Born: 13 February 1996 (age 30) Croatia

Sport
- Sport: Canoeing
- Event: Wildwater canoeing
Medal record
Event	1st	2nd	3rd
World Championships	0	1	1

Ivan Tolić (born 13 March 1996) is a Croatian male canoeist who won two medals at senior level at the Wildwater Canoeing World Championships.

== Medals at the World Championships ==
Senior

Year	1st place, gold medalist(s)	2nd place, silver medalist(s)	3rd place, bronze medalist(s)
2016	0	1	0
2019	0	0	1
