= Pupa (disambiguation) =

A pupa is the life stage of some insects undergoing transformation between immature and mature stages.

Pupa may also refer to:

- Pupa (gastropod), a genus of small sea snails
- Pupa (Hasidic dynasty), in Judaism
- Pupa (manga), a horror manga series
- "Pupa", song by Aidan from This Is Aidan, 2023
- Alba Encarnación (1956–2012), nicknamed "Pupa", a Puerto Rican community activist
- Metal Gear PUPA, an AI weapon and minor antagonist in the stealth video game Metal Gear Solid: Peace Walker

== See also ==
- Pápa, Hungary
