= Ogazón =

Ogazón is a Spanish surname. Notable people with the surname include:

- Alba Herrera y Ogazón (1885–1931), Mexican pianist
- Arturo Barea Ogazon (1897–1957), Spanish journalist, broadcaster and writer
- Bernardo Doroteo Reyes Ogazón (1850–1913), Mexican general and politician
- Ignacio Luis Vallarta Ogazón (1830–1893), Mexican jurist, governor of Jalisco
- Pedro Ogazón (1821–1890), Mexican politician, governor of Jalisco
