= Michal Šmoldas =

Czech canoeist

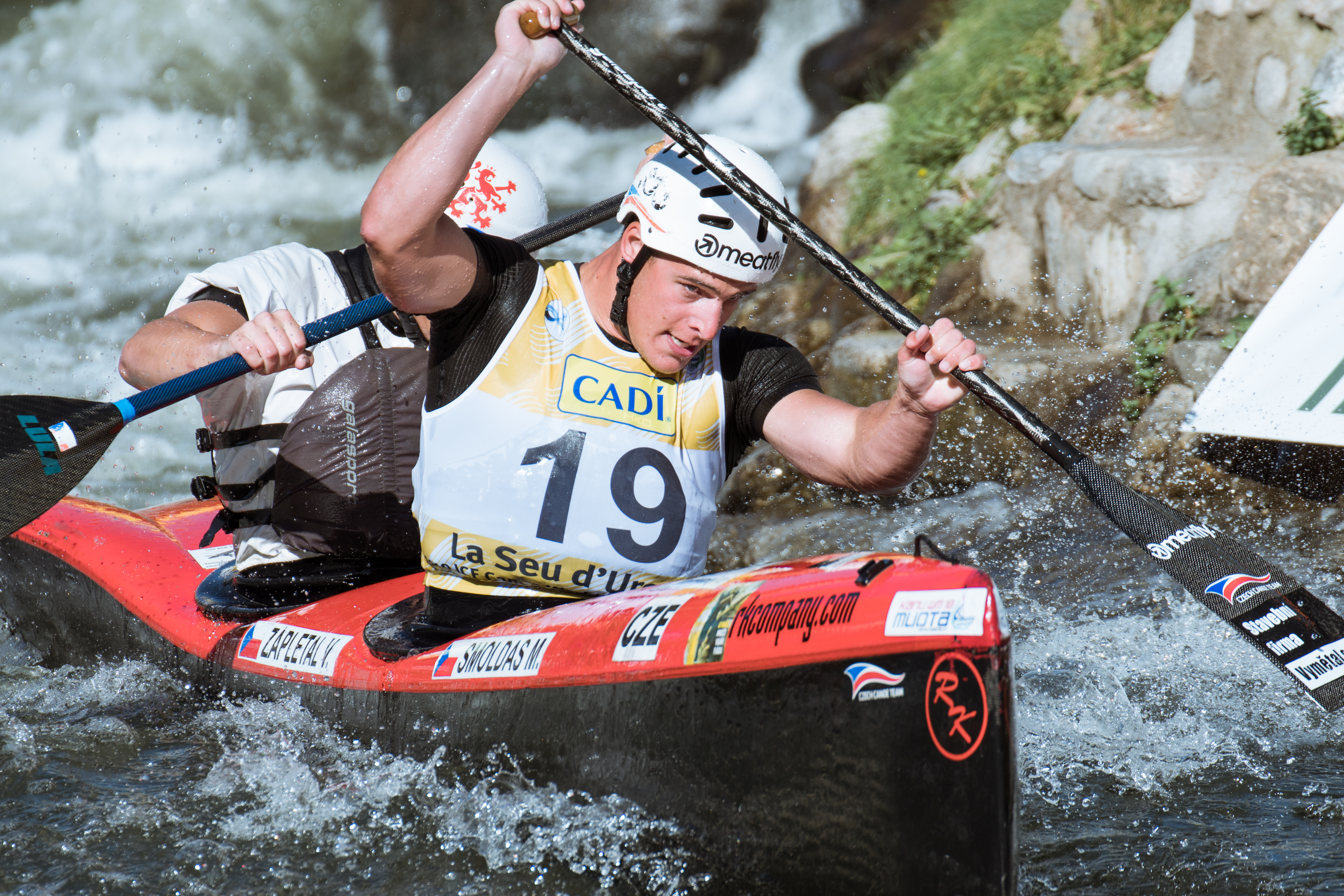
- Šmoldas (#19) in 2019

Personal information
- Nationality: Czech
- Born: 8 June 1998 (age 28) Czech Republic

Sport
- Sport: Canoeing
- Event: Wildwater canoeing

Michal Šmoldas (born 8 June 1998) is a Czech male canoeist who was 8th in the C1 sprint senior final at the 2016 Wildwater Canoeing World Championships.

== Achievements ==
Year	Competition	Venue	Rank	Event	Time
2016	World Championships	(Bosnia and Herzegovina) Banja Luka	8th	C1 sprint	1:00.31
2016	World Championships	(Bosnia and Herzegovina) Banja Luka	14th	C1 classic	15:45.21
