= Emilie Holt =

Danish footballer (born 2007)

Personal information
- Full name: Emilie Liv Juul Luplau Holt
- Date of birth: 27 January 2007 (age 19)
- Position: Midfielder

Team information
- Current team: Madrid CFF
- Number: 8

Senior career*
Years	Team	Apps	(Gls)
2023–2025	HB Køge	30	(2)
2026	Brøndby	6	(0)
2026–	Madrid CFF	3	(2)

International career
2022	Denmark U-16		
2023–2024	Denmark U-17		
2023–	Denmark U-19		
- * Club domestic league appearances and goals as of 12 September 2026

Emilie Liv Juul Luplau Holt (born 27 January 2007) is a Danish professional footballer who plays as a midfielder for Liga F club Madrid CFF.

== Club career ==
Holt made her first-team debut on HB Køge on 9 September 2023, coming on as a halftime substitute in a 3–1 victory over KÍ Klaksvík in the first qualifying round of the UEFA Women's Champions League. Three weeks later, she made her league debut in a 4–2 win over AGF. She became a first-team regular the following season, starting in the 3–0 league opener win over B.93 on 9 August 2024. On 15 March 2025, she scored her first league goal with a penalty in a 3–1 victory over Brøndby.

On 19 January 2026, Holt joined fellow Danish club Brøndby on a two-and-a-half-year contract. She debuted for the club in a 2–1 league win over Fortuna Hjørring.

On 31 July 2026, it was announced that Holt had joined Spanish club Madrid CFF. She debuted in the league opener on 29 August, starting in a 3–1 win over Granada. The following week, she scored her first goal for the club and added an assist in a 3–1 win against Valencia.
