= Viktória Scholczová =

Slovak canoeist

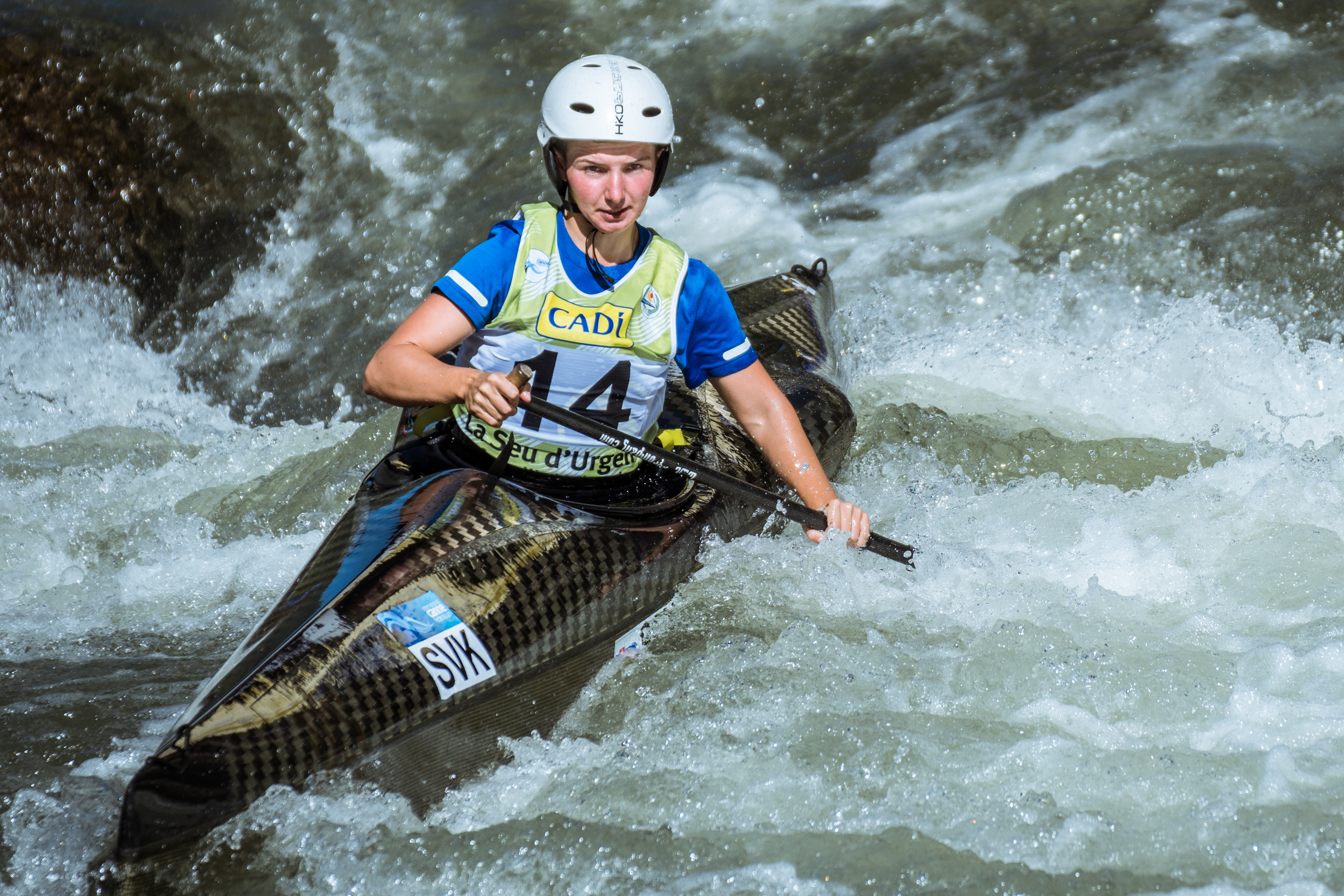
- Scholczová in 2019

Personal information
- Nationality: Slovak
- Born: 2 August 2000 (age 25) Slovakia

Sport
- Sport: Canoeing
- Event: Wildwater canoeing

Viktória Scholczová (born 2 August 2000) is a Slovak female canoeist who was 7th with Katarína Kopúnová in the C2 sprint senior final at the 2019 Wildwater Canoeing World Championships.

== Achievements ==
Year	Competition	Venue	Rank	Event	Time
2019	World Championships	(Spain) La Seu d'Urgell	7th	C2 sprint	1:10.00
2019	World Championships	(Spain) La Seu d'Urgell	6th	K1 sprint team	1:37.33
