= Dawn Ward =

Dawn Ward may refer to:

- Dawn Ward (chemist), American chemist
- Dawn Ward (TV personality), cast member of the UK reality show The Real Housewives of Cheshire
