= Alba Zoe Gržin =

Croatian canoeist

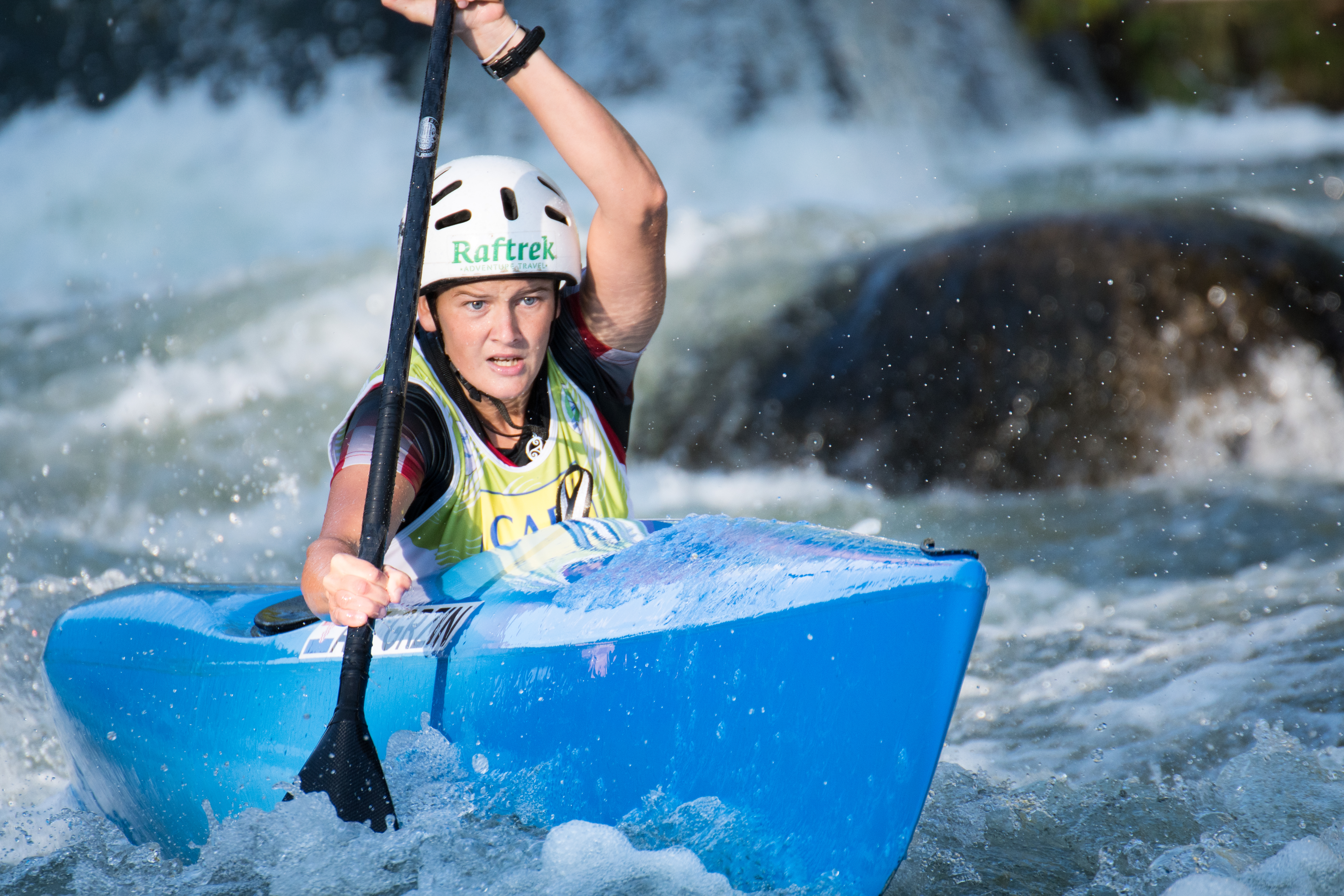
- Gržin in 2019

Personal information
- Nationality: Croatian
- Born: 1 October 1996 (age 29) Zagreb, Croatia

Sport
- Sport: Canoeing
- Event: Wildwater canoeing
- Club: Kanu klub Končar
Medal record
Wildwater U23 World Championships
Bronze medal – third place	2017 Murau	C1 sprint

Alba Zoe Gržin (born 1 October 1996) is a Croatian female canoeist who was finalist at five senior races at the Wildwater Canoeing World Championships.

== Biography ==
In 2017, at the Wildwater U23 World Championships she won in C1 sprint a bronze medal, which is the first Croatian women's medal in the history of the canoeing world championships.

== Achievements ==
Year	Competition	Venue	Rank	Event	Time
2018	World Championships	(Bosnia and Herzegovina) Banja Luka	8th	C1 classic	17:11.54
2018	World Championships	(Bosnia and Herzegovina) Banja Luka	5th	C1 sprint	1:12.75
2018	World Championships	(Bosnia and Herzegovina) Banja Luka	4th	C2 classic	18:02.14
2018	World Championships	(Switzerland) Muotathal	7th	C1 classic	14:38.25
2019	World Championships	(Spain) La Seu d'Urgell	4th	C1 sprint	1:10.31
