= René Brücker =

German canoeist

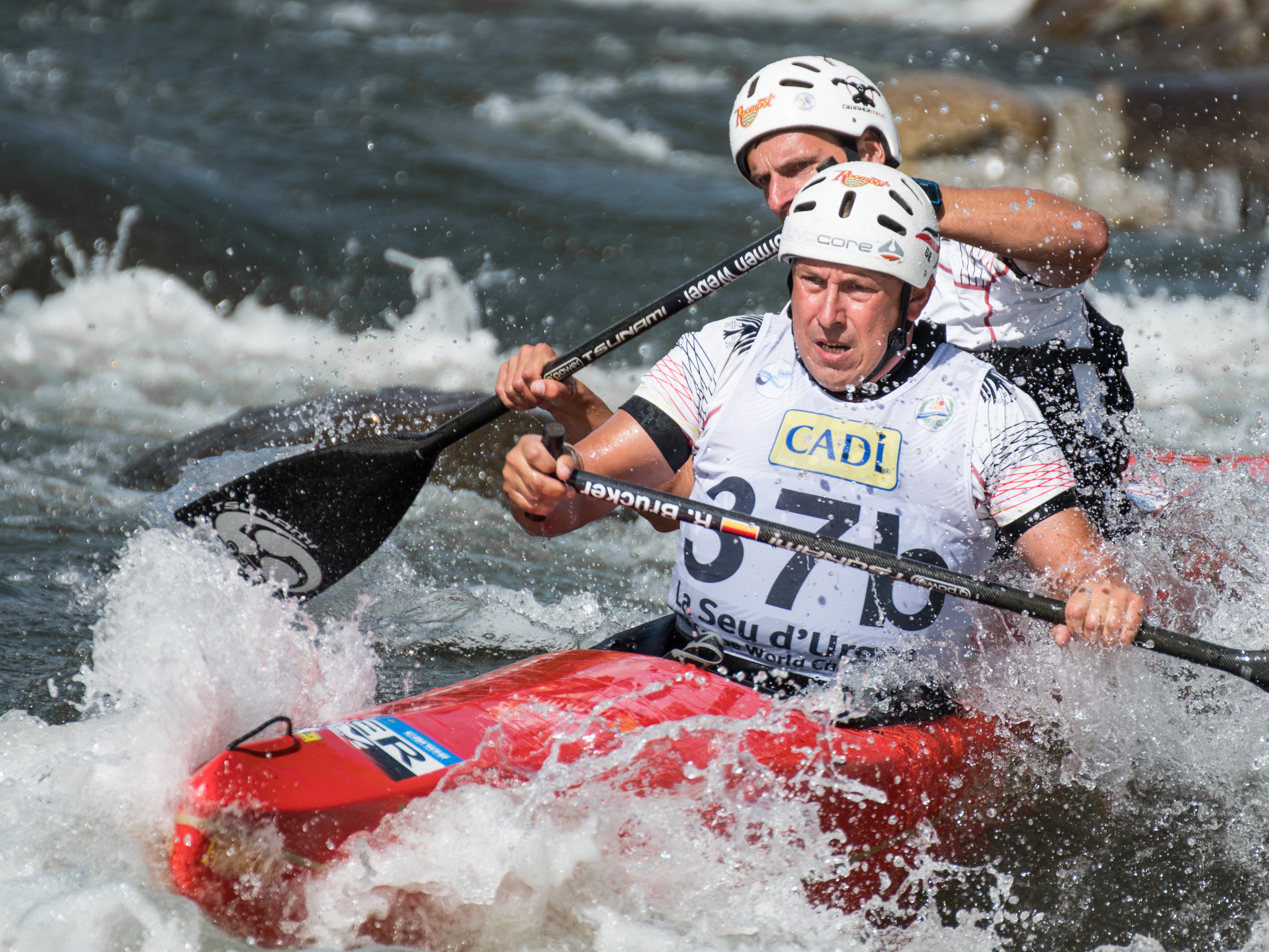
- Brücker (#37b) in 2019

Personal information
- Nationality: German
- Born: 9 December 1966 (age 59) Germany

Sport
- Sport: Canoeing
- Event: Wildwater canoeing
Medal record
Event	1st	2nd	3rd
World Championships	0	2	2

René Brücker (born 9 December 1966) is a German male canoeist who won four medals at senior level at the Wildwater Canoeing World Championships.

He won a silver at the world championships in 2019 at the age of 52.

== Medals at the World Championships ==
Senior

Year	1st place, gold medalist(s)	2nd place, silver medalist(s)	3rd place, bronze medalist(s)
2014	0	1	0
2016	0	0	2
2019	0	1	0
