= Katarína Kopúnová =

Slovak canoeist

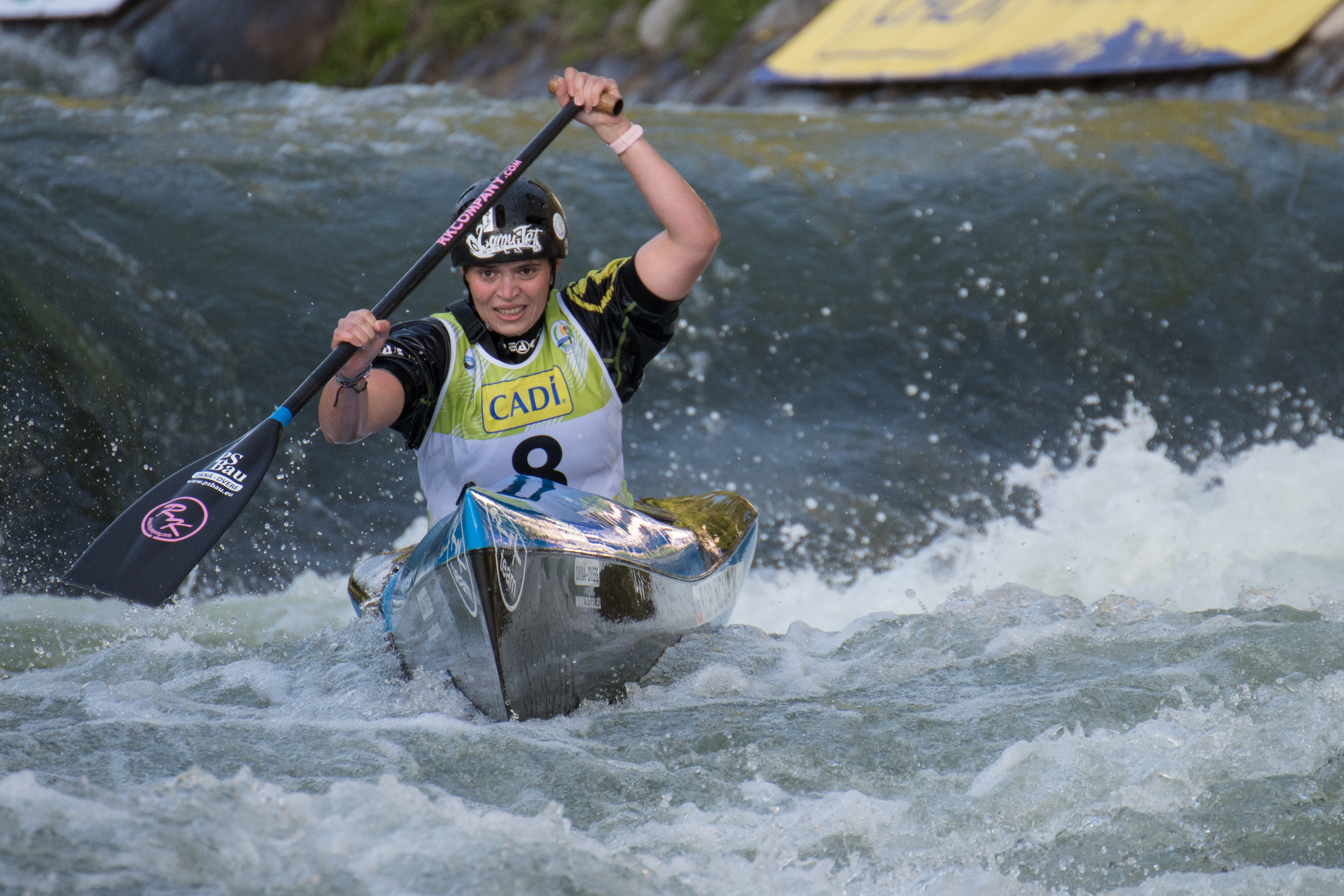
- Kopúnová in 2019

Personal information
- Nationality: Slovak
- Born: 26 July 1994 (age 31) Slovakia

Sport
- Sport: Canoeing
- Event(s): Bratislava, Wildwater canoeing
- Club: ŠKP Bratislava
Medal record
Wildwater canoeing
Event	1st	2nd	3rd
World Championships	1	0	2

Katarína Kopúnová (born 26 July 1994) is a Slovak female canoeist who won three medals (one gold) at senior level at the Wildwater Canoeing World Championships.

== Biography ==
Kopúnová was 7th with Viktória Scholczová in the C2 sprint senior final at the 2019 Wildwater Canoeing World Championships.

== Achievements ==
Year	Competition	Venue	Rank	Event	Time
2016	World Championships	(Bosnia and Herzegovina) Banja Luka	3rd	C2 classic	17:15,82
2016	World Championships	(Bosnia and Herzegovina) Banja Luka	1st	C2 sprint	1:0863
2017	World Championships	(France) Pau	3rd	C2 classic	1:00:29
2018	World Championships	(Switzerland) Muotathal	9th	C1 classic	14:40.25
2018	World Championships	(Switzerland) Muotathal	10th	C1 sprint	1:27.32
2019	World Championships	(Spain) La Seu d'Urgell	9th	C1 sprint	1:09.14
2019	World Championships	(Spain) La Seu d'Urgell	7th	C2 sprint	1:10.00
2019	World Championships	(Spain) La Seu d'Urgell	6th	K1 sprint team	1:37.33
