= Davide Maccagnan =

Italian canoeist (born 1987)

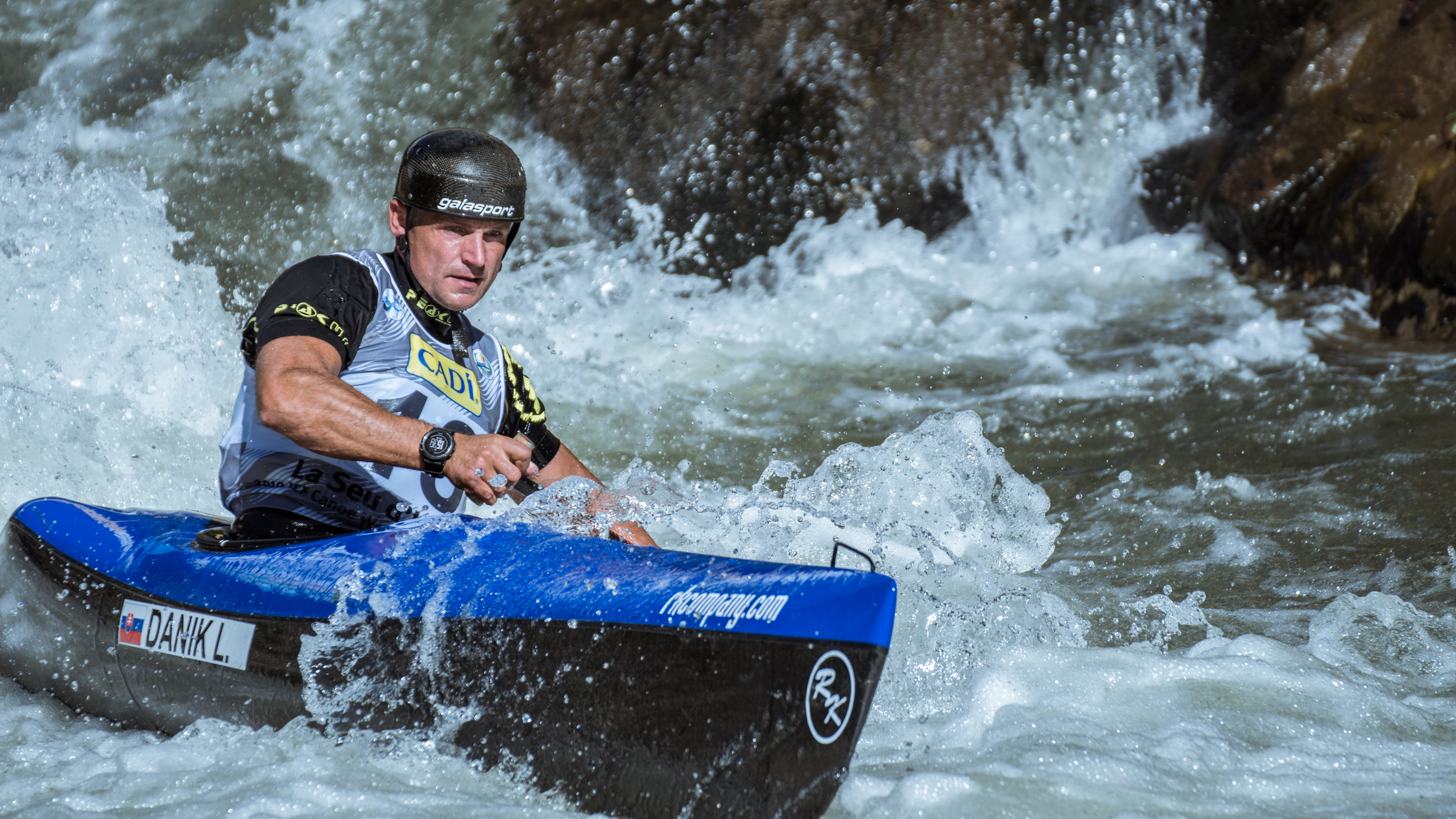
- Maccagnan in 2019

Personal information
- Nationality: Italian
- Born: 21 August 1987 (age 38) Bassano del Grappa, Italy

Sport
- Sport: Canoeing
- Event: Wildwater canoeing
- Club: Valbrenta Team
- Coached by: Robert Pontarollo
Medal record
Event	1st	2nd	3rd
World Championships	0	0	3
European Championships	0	0	1
Total	0	0	4

Davide Maccagnan (born 23 December 1987) is an Italian male canoeist who won four medals at senior level at the Wildwater Canoeing World Championships and European Wildwater Championships.

== Biography ==
At international competitions he competed in kayak and Canadian races.

== Achievements ==
Year	Competition	Venue	Rank	Event	Time
2014	World Championships	(Italy) Valtellina	3rd	K1 sprint team	43.23
2016	World Championships	(Bosnia and Herzegovina) Banja Luka	3rd	K1 sprint team	56.76
2017	European Championships	(North Macedonia) Skopje	3rd	C2 sprint team	49.26
2018	World Championships	(Switzerland) Muotathal	3rd	C2 classic team	13:57.25
