= Madrid CFF =

Spanish women's football club based in Fuenlabrada

- Full name: Madrid Club de Fútbol Femenino
- Founded: 2010; 16 years ago
- Stadium: Estadio Fernando Torres
- Capacity: 5,400
- President: Alfredo Ulloa
- Head coach: Victor Alba
- League: Liga F
- 2025–26: 9th
- Website: madridcff.com
Home colours	Away colours

Madrid Club de Fútbol Femenino (Spanish pronunciation: [maˈðɾið ˈkluβ ðe ˈfuðβol]; Madrid Women's Football Club) is a Spanish women's football club based in San Sebastián de los Reyes, Community of Madrid, that currently plays in Liga F.

== History ==
Madrid CFF was founded in 2010 by Alfredo Ulloa who chose to play in white kits in homage to Real Madrid, although the clubs have no formal connection. Media speculation that the club would be taken over by Real Madrid in 2014 proved to be unfounded.

In 2013, after playing three seasons in the regional leagues, the club made its debut in Segunda División. Four years later, the club promoted for the first time ever to the First Division. After this promotion, the club moved to Estadio Matapiñonera in San Sebastián de los Reyes.

== Season by season ==
Season	Division	Place	Copa de la Reina
2010–11	1ª Reg.	5th	
2011–12	1ª Reg.	1st	
2012–13	Pref.	2nd	
2013–14	2ª	3rd	
2014–15	2ª	1st	
2015–16	2ª	2nd	
2016–17	2ª	1st	
2017–18	1ª	10th	
2018–19	1ª	13th	Quarter-finals
2019–20	1ª	13th	Quarter-finals
2020–21	1ª	7th	Semi-finals
2021–22	1ª	13th	Quarter-finals
2022–23	1ª	5th	Round of 16
2023–24	1ª	6th	Round of 16
2024–25	1ª	10th	Quarter-finals
2025–26	1ª	9th	Quarter-finals

== Players ==
=== Current squad ===
As of 12 August 2026

Note: Flags indicate national team as defined under FIFA eligibility rules; some limited exceptions apply. Players may hold more than one non-FIFA nationality.

No.	Pos.	Nation	Player
1	GK	ESP	Paola (captain)
2	DF	NZL	Kate Taylor
4	DF	ESP	Sandra Villafañe
5	DF	BRA	Mônica
6	MF	CHI	Nerea Sánchez
7	FW	MAR	Sakina Ouzraoui
8	MF	DEN	Emilie Holt
9	FW	ESP	Bárbara López
13	GK	ESP	Belén de García

No.	Pos.	Nation	Player
14	FW	ESP	Alba Ruiz
19	DF	ESP	Núria Mendoza
20	MF	ESP	Ángela Sosa
21	MF	ESP	Marina Rivas
23	FW	NOR	Emilie Nautnes
24	MF	SWE	Freja Olofsson
—	FW	ESP	Paula León
—	FW	VEN	Raiderlin Carrasco
—	FW	KOR	Jo Hye-young

=== Reserve team and Youth Academy ===
Note: Flags indicate national team as defined under FIFA eligibility rules; some limited exceptions apply. Players may hold more than one non-FIFA nationality.

No.	Pos.	Nation	Player
26	DF	ESP	Natalia Serrano
27	MF	ESP	Claudia García
28	MF	ESP	Sofía Hernández
29	FW	ESP	María Aymerich
30	GK	ESP	Belén de Gracia
31	GK	ESP	Nuria Troncoso
32	GK	ESP	Noelia Rivarola
33	DF	PUR	Estefanía González
34	DF	ESP	Clara Villanueva
35	FW	ESP	Zaira Gallardo
36	DF	ESP	Ana Coya

=== Reserve team ===
Note: Flags indicate national team as defined under FIFA eligibility rules; some limited exceptions apply. Players may hold more than one non-FIFA nationality.

No. / Pos. / Nation / Player	No. / Pos. / Nation / Player
