= Sabine Füsser =

German canoeist

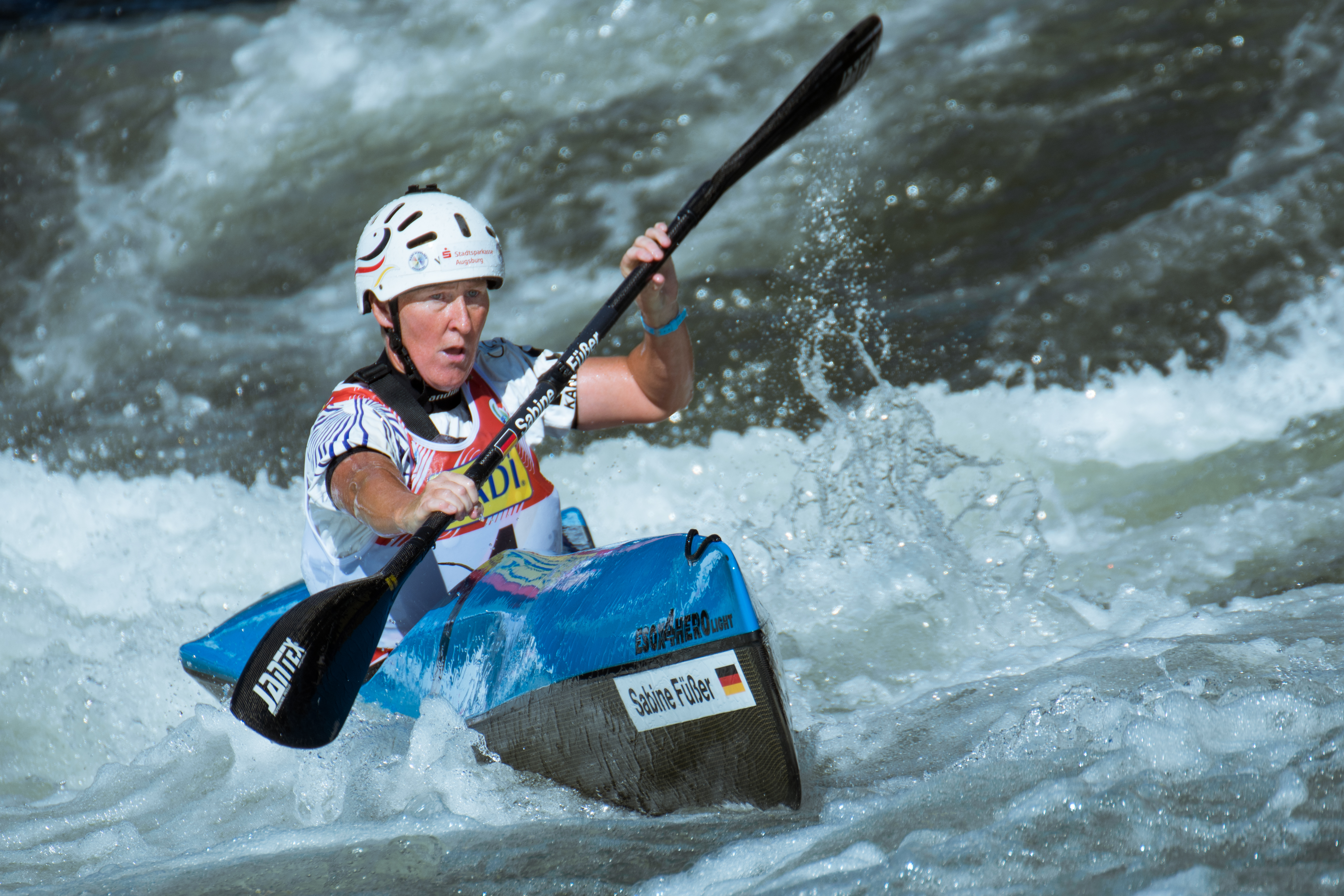
- Füsser in 2019

Personal information
- Nationality: German
- Born: 29 November 1974 (age 51) Germany

Sport
- Sport: Canoeing
- Event: Wildwater canoeing
Medal record
Event	1st	2nd	3rd
World Championships	1	2	3

Sabine Füsser (born 29 November 1974) is a German female canoeist who won six medals at senior level at the Wildwater Canoeing World Championships.

== Medals at the World Championships ==
Senior

Year	1st place, gold medalist(s)	2nd place, silver medalist(s)	3rd place, bronze medalist(s)
2013	0	1	0
2014	1	0	0
2016	0	1	0
2017	0	0	1
2018	0	0	1
2019	0	0	1
