= Václav Kristek =

Czech canoeist

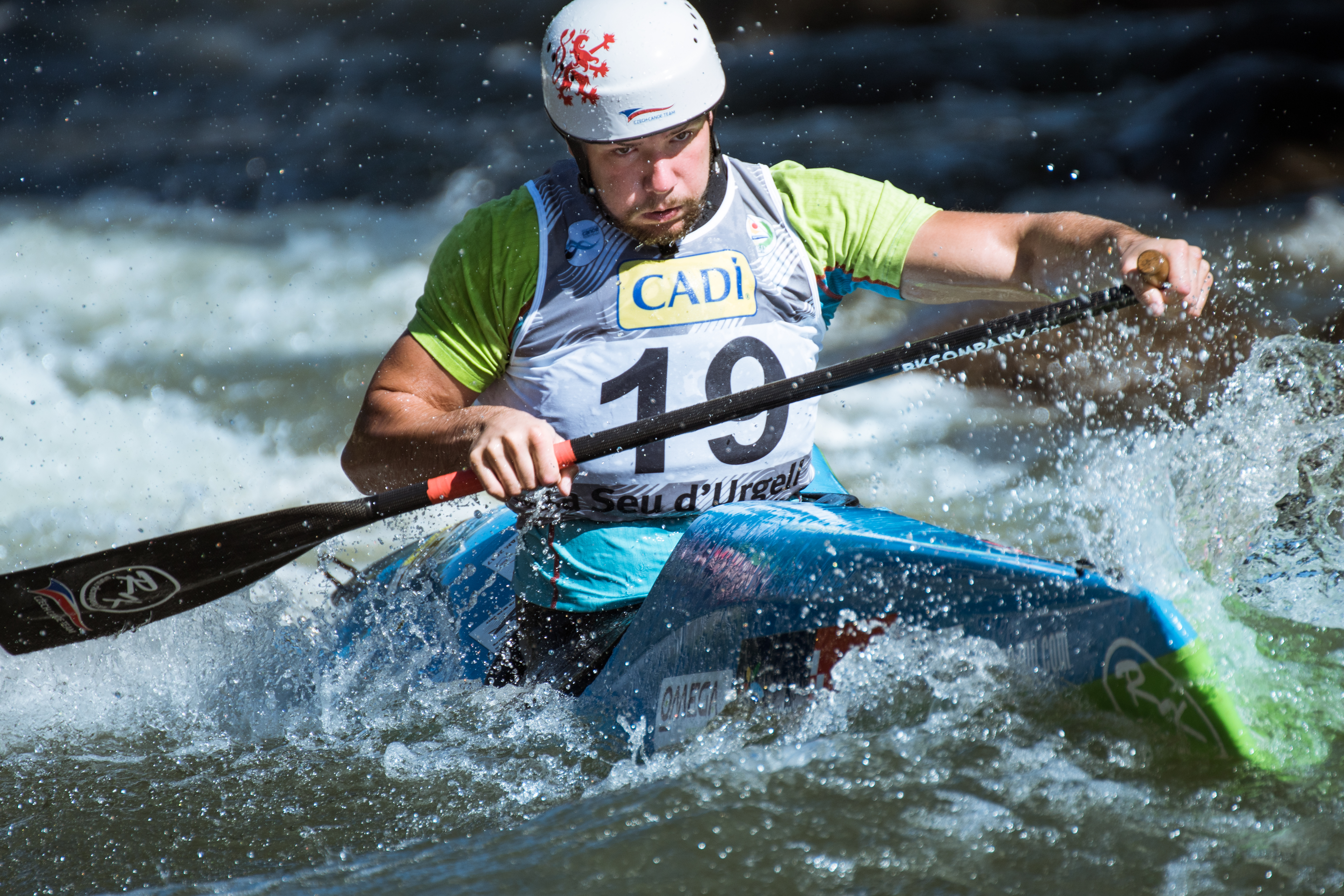
- Kristek in 2019

Personal information
- Nationality: Czech
- Born: 21 June 1996 (age 30) Czech Republic

Sport
- Sport: Canoeing
- Event: Wildwater canoeing
- Club: TJ Valašské Meziříčí
Medal record
Event	1st	2nd	3rd
World Championships	2	1	1

Václav Kristek (born 21 June 1996) is a Czech male canoeist who won four medals (two gold) at senior level at the Wildwater Canoeing World Championships.
