= Björn Beerschwenger =

German canoeist

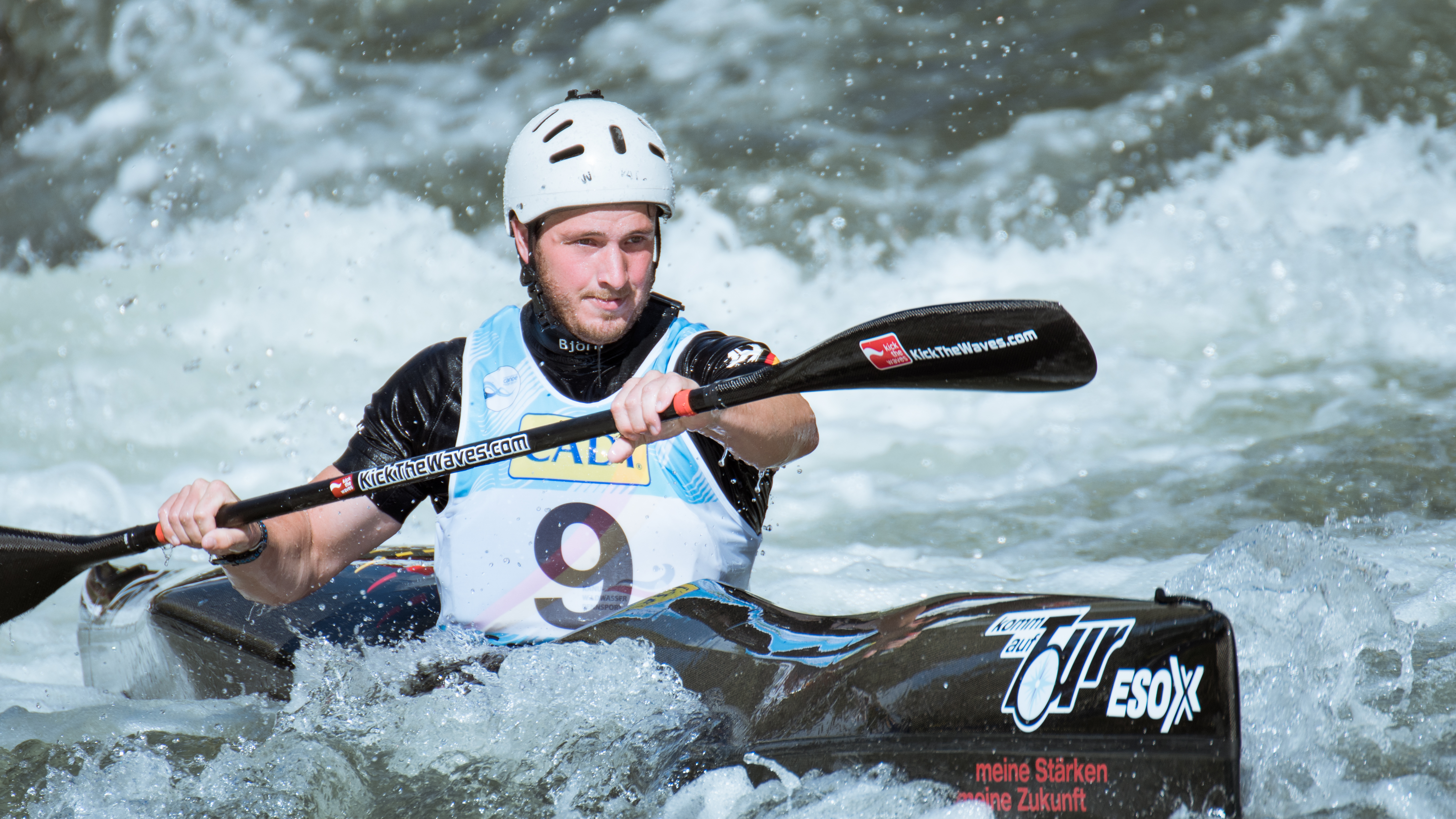
- Beerschwenger in 2019

Personal information
- Nationality: German
- Born: 9 October 1991 (age 34) Cologne, Germany

Sport
- Sport: Canoeing
- Event: Wildwater canoeing
- Club: Rhein-Kanu-Club Köln
Medal record
Event	1st	2nd	3rd
World Championships	1	0	3
European Championships	1	1	2
Total	2	1	5

Björn Beerschwenger (born 9 October 1991) is a German canoeist who won eight senior medals at the Wildwater Canoeing World Championships and European Wildwater Championships.
