= Dawn Charging =

American politician

Dawn Marie Charging

Member of the North Dakota House of Representatives from the 4th district
- In office 2005 – March 14, 2008 Serving with Kenton Onstad
- Preceded by: John M. Warner
- Succeeded by: Daryl Lies

Personal details
- Party: Republican

Dawn Marie Charging is an American politician. She served in the North Dakota House of Representatives from 2005 to 2008 as a Republican.

== Biography ==
Charging is a member of the Mandan, Hidatsa, and Arikara Nation, and was the first member to serve in the North Dakota Legislative Assembly. Prior to entering politics, Charging worked as a freelance photographer and writer.

Charging worked as a journalist at the New Town News in New Town, North Dakota until April 2004. Initially, she chose not to run out of concern that being involved in politics as a journalist would compromise her journalistic integrity. She later chose to run after the deadline to register for the primary ballot had passed. Following a successful write-in campaign, Charging received enough votes to appear on the ballot in November, winning the general election as one of two Representatives from the 4th district.

Charging resigned on March 14, 2008, in order to accept a job with the United States Department of Agriculture.
