= Alba Alonso de Quesada =

Honduran lawyer and academic (1924–2020)

- Born: Alba Alonso Cleaves; 17 August 1924; Tegucigalpa, Honduras
- Died: 18 November 2020 (aged 96)
- Other names: Alba Alonso Cleaves de Quesada, Alba Alonso Quesada
- Occupation: Attorney
- Years active: 1958–2008

Alba Alonso de Quesada (17 August 1924 – 18 November 2020) was a Honduran lawyer and academic who played a pivotal role in the development of women's rights and anti-corruption policies in her country. She was the first woman to become a lawyer in Honduras and the first woman to serve as Secretary of the Ministry of Labor. Throughout her career, she worked for legal reforms to help children, families, women and the working classes, pressing for educational reform and providing pro bono legal aid. She was one of the driving forces who established the Transition Commission to evaluate corruption in educational institutions and led the Transparency and Ethics Commission in the development of transparency policies for the National Autonomous University of Honduras (UNAH). Twelve years after the conclusion of their reforms, in 2017, Alonso was recognized with an honorary doctorate from UNAH and the academic year of 2017 was dedicated to her by the Ministry of Culture.

== Early life ==
Alba Alonso Cleaves was born in 1924 in Tegucigalpa, Honduras to Cecilia de Jesús Cleaves and Agustín Alonzo. After completing her primary schooling at the Escuela República del Paraguay in Tegucigalpa, she attended the Normal School for Young Women, also in the capital, graduating with a license to teach. With a group of friends, who sought professional careers in law, medicine and pharmacy, she entered the National Autonomous University of Honduras (UNAH). In 1946, she graduated with a bachelor's degree in Legal Sciences from the law faculty of the UNAH, but was not allowed to practice, as at the time, women were not considered citizens in Honduras and the profession was only open to men. The inability to be able to practice as an attorney led her to the women's movement and the press for legal reform to protect the rights of women and families.

Joining the Federación de las Asociaciones Femeninas de Honduras (FAFH) (Federation of the Feminine Associations of Honduras), upon its founding in 1951, Alonso traveled the country with prominent women such as Alejandrina Bermúdez de Villeda and Regina Mendoza de Martin to educate women on their civic duties and rights. They established branches of FAFH in all the departments of the country and began a petition drive to grant rights to women, which was submitted to the legislature in 1952. Though it failed, two years later, the group submitted a second petition which passed. In 1955, women who were able to read were granted the right to vote and citizenship, FAFH members established in the capital the local branch of the Inter-American Commission of Women (Spanish: Comisión Interamericana de Mujeres, CIM). Victoria Buchard was appointed as the Honduran delegate to the international body, and Alonso was selected as the local group's secretary. CIM, in coordination with FAFH established the School of Social Services in 1957 and the following year pressed for creation of the National Board of Social Welfare. Both organizations were designed to allow women to participate in the political processes of social services offered to the nation.

== Career ==
As soon as women were granted agency, Alonso immediately returned to school to become a trial lawyer (abogado) and contract law specialist (notario), gaining the right to practice law in 1958. She married Arturo Quesada Galindo, an engineer, who became rector of UNAH from 1963 to 1969. The couple had three children: Rosa María, Roberto Arturo, and María Guadalupe. Alonso began her career working with marginalized women in the urban neighborhoods of Tegucigalpa, practicing family law. Often giving free legal aid, she pressed for legislation to protect the rights of children, families and women. In 1962, after the first military coup d'état, she was appointed as Secretary of the Ministry of Labor by President Ramón Villeda Morales, the first time a woman had held the post. When Villeda was ousted by a second coup, she was appointed in 1964 as the Secretary of the Office of Culture, Tourism and Information by President Oswaldo López Arellano.

In 1972, Alonso was serving as the Chief of the Educational Reform Commission in Honduras and pressed for national reforms to ensure access to education for women. She published Towards a Cultural Policy for Honduras in 1977, evaluating cultural and legal developments in the country from pre-colonial times to the 1970s and helped to draft legislation to protect cultural heritage. Among the public positions she held through her career were prosecutor in the Criminal Court, undersecretary of Education, director of the Department of Educational Planning for the Ministry of Education, and legal advisor to the Ministry of Culture, among others. She was instrumental in drafting numerous laws, including revisions to the Family Code, the law to address HIV/AIDs, the Law for the Alternative Development of Non-Formal Education, and the Law for the Institute for Children and the Family.

In 1994, Alonso led the efforts to eliminate gender biases in legal terminology and in 1998, helped establish the National Institute for Women, an office which regulates and promotes the human rights of women. In 2000, Alonso was one of the drafters of the Equality and Opportunities Law, which was presented to the legislature by Norma Marina García and Soad Salomón de Facusse and after passage formalized the legal basis for women and men's equality, and created target quotas for women at all political levels of governance. She also served as director of the legal services office of FAFH for many years.

As a member of the Transition Board of UNAH, Alonso worked with the team of lawyers to bring transparency to the management of the university, and was instrumental in pushing the legislature to pass the Organic Law of the university in 2004. Working with Norma Cecilia Martín de Reyes, Alonso led the Transparency and Ethics Commission, which uncovered corruption at the university, identifying over 100 bank accounts in use at the time, as well as secret policies to protect those in power. Between 2005 and 2008, the Transitional Commission evaluated staff and administration, academic standards, and governance regulations, drafting new rules for the university structure at every level. They drafted university policies to protect the autonomy and secularism of the university, as well as the right to public and higher education for all Hondurans. Meeting with the library staff, Alonso was also one of the authors of the Rules and Regulations for Information Resources.

In 2017, UNAH declared that the academic year was dedicated in her honor, recognition bestowed since 2008 by the Ministry of Culture to highlight significant figures in Honduras' development. Simultaneously, Alonso was bestowed an honorary degree by UNAH in recognition of her contributions to women's and children's rights, education and the legal profession in the country. In speaking at the presentation ceremony, Alonso reiterated her commitment, at 94, to the global fight to eliminate barriers which cause women to be subordinate and stressed that women needed to continue to fight for their freedom and control of their own bodies and agency.

== Death ==
De Quesada died on 18 November 2020 at the age of 96.
