= Yannic Lemmen =

German canoeist

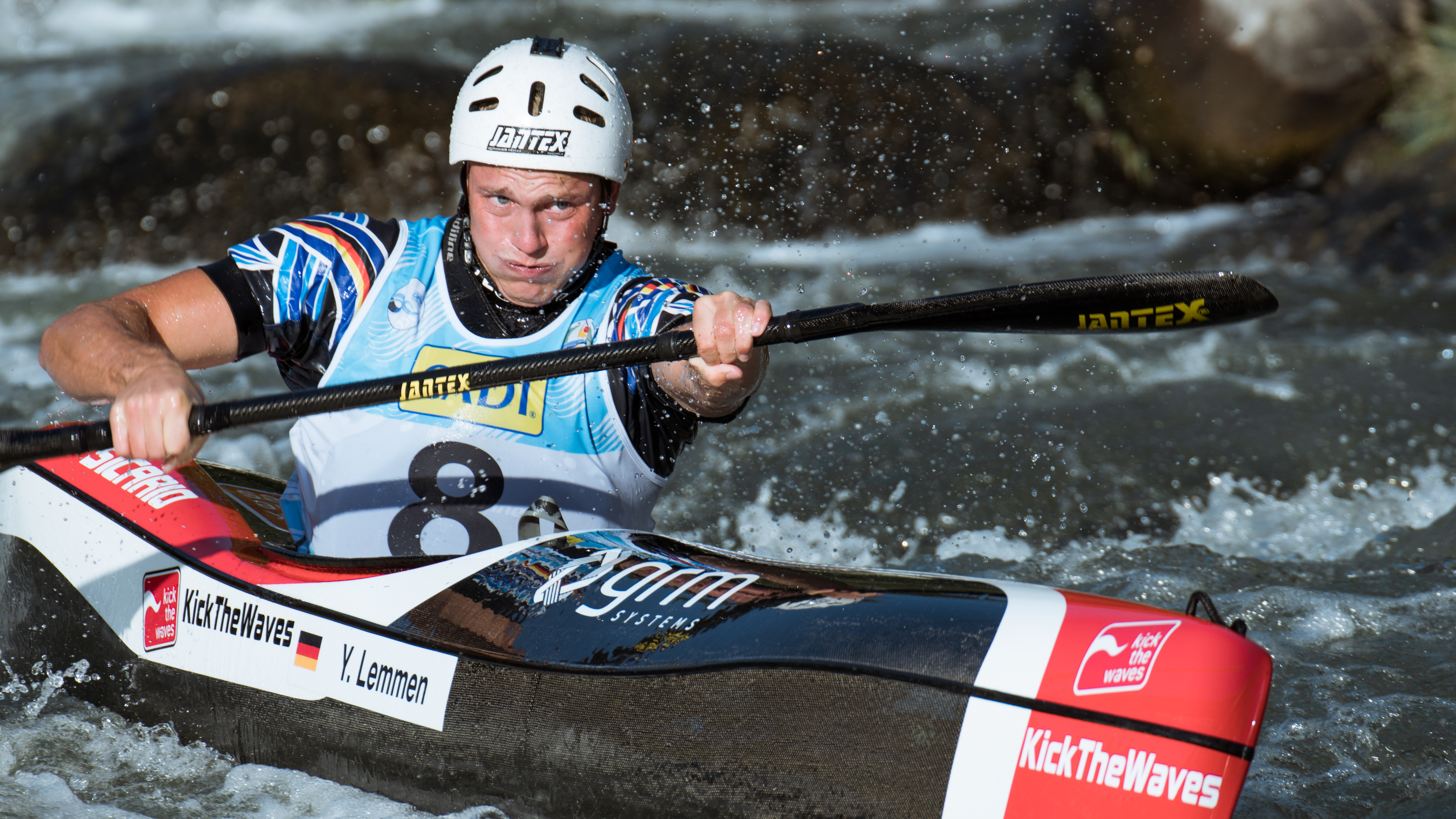
- Lemmen in 2019

Personal information
- Nationality: German
- Born: 19 April 1995 (age 31) Germany

Sport
- Sport: Canoeing
- Event: Wildwater canoeing
Medal record
Event	1st	2nd	3rd
World Championships	0	1	1

Yannic Lemmen (born 19 April 1995) is a German male canoeist who won two medals at senior level at the Wildwater Canoeing World Championships.

== Medals at the World Championships ==
Senior

Year	1st place, gold medalist(s)	2nd place, silver medalist(s)	3rd place, bronze medalist(s)
2017	0	0	1
2019	0	1	0
