= Alba Ruiz =

Spanish footballer (born 2001)

Personal information
- Full name: Alba Ruiz Soto
- Date of birth: 11 November 2001 (age 25)
- Place of birth: Madrid, Spain
- Position: Forward

Team information
- Current team: Madrid CFF
- Number: 32

Youth career
- 2017–2018: Madrid CFF

Senior career*
Years	Team	Apps	(Gls)
2018–2019	Barcelona		
2019–	Madrid CFF B	48	(4)
2020–	Madrid CFF	1	(0)
- * Club domestic league appearances and goals as of 17:50, 26 November 2021 (UTC)

Alba Ruiz Soto (born 11 November 2001) is a Spanish footballer who plays as a forward for Madrid CFF.

Ruiz started her career at Madrid CFF's academy.
