= Dawn Ward (chemist) =

Synthetic organic chemist

Dawn N. Ward
- Education: University of Maryland, Baltimore County (PhD, 2003); Lincoln University (BA, 1995)
- Scientific career
- Fields: Chemistry
- Institutions: Stevenson University

Dawn N. Ward is an American synthetic organic chemist and associate professor in chemistry at Stevenson University.

== Background and career ==
Ward grew up in Baltimore, Maryland, and graduated from Woodlawn High School. After receiving her BA in chemistry from Lincoln University, she worked in multiple chemical industry positions and was a public schoolteacher. Ward returned to the University of Maryland, Baltimore County for her Ph.D. in 2003, receiving it in 2009. Ward's research group at Stevenson researches potent Heterocyclic amine-based Helicase inhibitors of Hepatitis C.

=== Community work and volunteering ===
Ward works to promote racial diversity in STEM fields through the Ingenuity Project. She is on the board of advisors for the Black Girls Dive Foundation.

== Awards and honors ==
- Meyerhoff Graduate Fellow, 2009
