= Valentina Razzauti =

Italian canoeist

Personal information
- Nationality: Italian
- Born: 26 March 1998 (age 28) Sarzana, Italy
- Height: 164 cm (5 ft 5 in)
- Weight: 50 kg (110 lb)

Sport
- Sport: Canoeing
- Event: Wildwater canoeing
- Club: Federazione Italiana Canoa Kayak
- Coached by: Giovanni Saperdi
Medal record
Event	1st	2nd	3rd
World Championships	2	4	1
European Championships	4	2	4
Total	6	6	5

Valentina Razzauti (born 26 March 1998) is an Italian female canoeist who won four medals at senior level of the Wildwater Canoeing World Championships and European Wildwater Championships with the total of seventeen international medals.
