= Dawn Rasmussen =

Retired athlete and sports administrator from Samoa

Dawn Therese Rasmussen is a retired athlete and sports administrator from Samoa. She was also the first physical education teacher in the country.

Rasmussen has represented Samoa in netball, hockey, tennis and athletics, including attending five Pacific Games, beginning in 1963. She later helped establish sports organisations for school athletics, junior tennis, hockey, netball and women's rugby union.

Rasmussen was the first physical education teacher in Samoa and trained PE teachers at the Western Samoa Teachers Training College, then at the National University of Samoa. She served as the delegate for Samoa to the International Federation of Physical Education (FIEP) for some years. In 2010 she completed a master's degree in teaching and learning at the University of Canterbury, New Zealand.

in 2016 Rasmussen was inducted into Samoa's Sports Hall of Fame.
