= Alba Marina Cotes =

Colombian biologist

Alba Marina Cotes Prado
- Born: February 15, 1959 (age 67); Bogotá, Colombia
- Education: Free University of Colombia, University of Los Andes (Colombia), Gembloux Agro-Bio Tech (Belgium)
- Known for: Microbiology, Phytopathology
- Awards: Honoris Causa degree - Swedish University of Agricultural Sciences

Alba Marina Cotes Prado (Bogota, February 15 1959), is a Colombian chemist and biologist, known for her research on biological pest control. In 2009, Cotes became the first Latin American woman in receive a Honoris Causa degree from the Swedish University of Agricultural Sciences.

== Biography ==
Cotes finished a bachelor's degree in chemistry and biology at Free University of Colombia in 1980. Then, she started her graduate studies at Universidad of los Andes in 1982. She did graduate programs in food microbiology and industrial microbiology, followed by a master's degree in microbiology (1986). Cotes did also a master's degree in agricultural biotechnology in 1988 and a Ph.D in agricultural sciences focused on phytopathology in 1994, both at Gembloux Agro-Bio Tech in Belgium. In 2009, she received a Honoris Causa degree by the Swedish University of Agricultural Sciences.

In 1994, Cotes started working at the Colombian Corporation for Agricultural Research (CORPOICA) as the Biotechnology Center director, where she started a research group focused on the development of pesticides for phytopathogen control in agriculture. In addition, she has been professor in multiple academic institutions in Colombia, such as Universidad of los Andes, Nueva Granada Military University, and Pedagogical and Technological University of Colombia. She has published more than one hundred papers in peer review journals, twenty books, and twelve book chapters.

== Selected publications ==
The following is Cotes most notable publications.

- 2006 - Resumen de Investigaciones en el Control Biológico de las Moscas Blancas (Research Summary on the Biological Control of Whiteflies) ISBN 958-8210-88-7
- 2005 - Reconocimiento, Selección y Evaluación de Aislamientos Nativos de Virus de la Granulosis para el Control Biológico de la Polilla Guatemalteca de la Papa (Recognition, Selection and Evaluation of Native Isolates of Granulosis Virus for the Biological Control of the Guatemalan Potato Moth) ISBN 958-8210-87-9
- 2012 - Uso de Lecanicillium Lecanii para el Control de la Mosca Blanca (Lecanicillium Lecanii Use for Whitefly Control) ISBN 978-958-740-106-6
- 2012 - Uso de los Compuestos Volátiles de la Papa en el Control de la Polilla Guatemalteca (Use of the Volatile Compounds of the Potato in the Control of the Guatemalan Moth) ISBN 978-958-740-096-0
- 2009 - Levaduras nativas como aditivos funcionales para mejorar la nutrición de monogástricos y rumiantes en condiciones tropicales (Native yeasts as functional additives to improve monogastric and ruminant nutrition in tropical conditions) ISBN 978-958-740-001-4
- Cotes, Alba Marina (October 2018). Control biológico de fitopatógenos, insectos y ácaros [Biological control of phytopathogenics, insects and mites] (in Spanish). Mosquera, Colombia: Mosquera-Bogotá : Agrosavia Editorial. ISBN 9789587402551. OCLC 1224242156.

== Awards and honours ==
Cotes has been awarded the following honours.

- Successful Women Award - Science and Technology category, Fundación Mujeres de Éxito, 2013
- National Award in Phytopathology - Colombian Association of Phytopathology and Related Sciences, 2011
- Recognition for outstanding scientific work - Corporación para el Desarrollo Industrial De La Biotecnología, 2008
- Scientific Merit Medal - Colombian Agricultural Research Corporation, 2009
- Luis Hernando Pino Santiago National Entomology Prize - Colombian Society of Entomology, 2009
- Honorary Doctorate in Agricultural Sciences - Swedish University of Agricultural Sciences, 2009
- Honorable Mention - Colombian Society of Entomology, 2000
- National Prize for Soil Science - Colombian Society of Soil Science, 2000
- National Phytopathology Award - Colombian Association of Phytopathology and Related Sciences, 1998
- Professor Ad-honorem - Institute of Biotechnology, National University of Colombia, 1994
