= Alba Florio =

Italian poet (1910–2011)

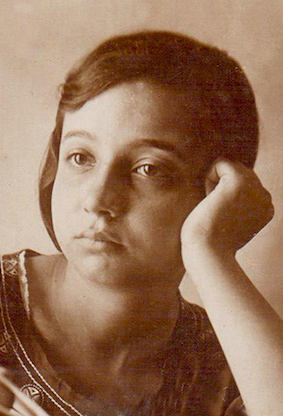
Alba Florio

Alba Florio (21 April 1910 – 31 May 2011) was an Italian poet, the last belonging to the Decadentism current.

== Life ==
Alba Florio was born on 21 April 1910 in Scilla and grew up in Calabria, soaking up its traditions and its ways of thinking and putting everything in verses since her teenage years.

Her introverted nature and the fact that she lived in a tiny village in Calabria kept her away from all the cultural and editorial circles, which led to poor diffusion of her work. When Estasi e preghiere (1929), her first poetry collection, came out, very few people noticed the young poet. The old poet Vincenzo Gerace, who shared her Calabrian origin, was one of the few who did notice and wrote an ode about her.

Oltremorte (1936) was the last of Alba's hermetic works. In her writing, she was heavily influenced by Giovanni Pascoli, echoed the dramatic tones of Giuseppe Ungaretti and opened herself to Salvatore Quasimodo's new propositions: in those years, Quasimodo was living in Messina and Reggio Calabria. With Oltremorte Alba won the "Maria Enrica Viola" poetry prize.

In her two last collections, Troveremo il pane sconosciuto (1939) and Come mare a riva (1956), existential pessimism is deeply present and largely explored. «Vegliamo la tempesta / crocifissi alle rocce / albatri dagli occhi viola» («We watch over the storm / crucified to the rocks / Purple-eyed albatri»). The same themes are represented in many of Lorenzo Calogero's lyrics, born in the same years and place as Alba.

Alba died on 31 May 2011 in Messina. She was 100 years old.

== Collections ==
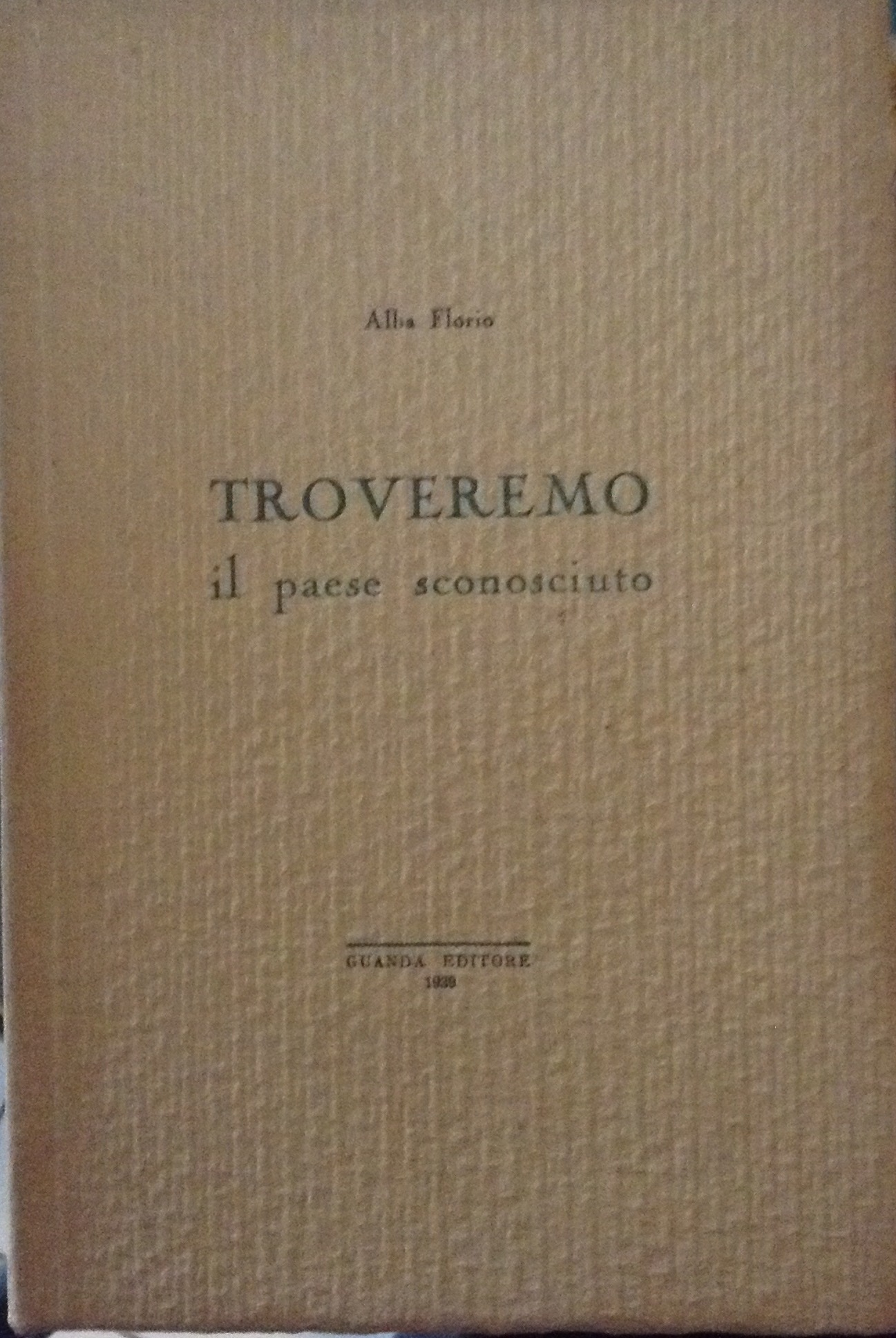
Troveremo il paese sconosciuto - cover

- Estasi e preghiere, Messina, 1929.
- Oltremorte, Milano, I.T.E., 1936.
- Troveremo il paese sconosciuto, Modena, Guanda, 1939.
- Come mare a riva, Messina, 1956.
- Ultima striscia di cielo, Cosenza, Pellegrini, 2000 (introduction by Antonio Piromalli).
