= Alba Zaluar =

Brazilian anthropologist (1942–2019)

Alba Maria Zaluar
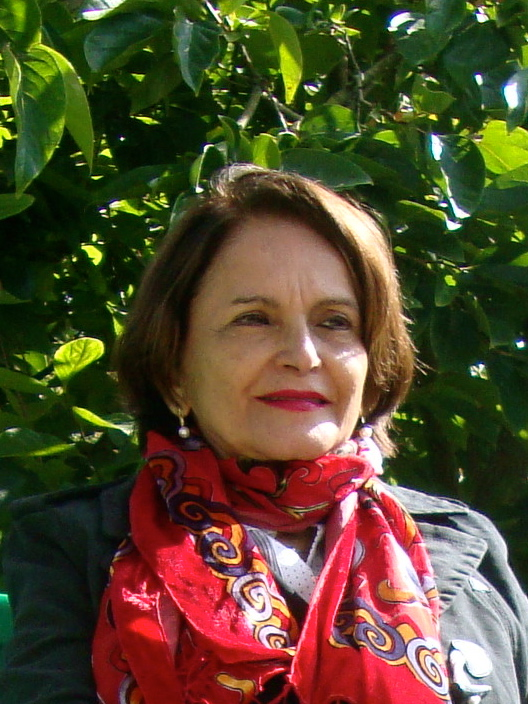
- Zaluar in 2011
- Born: 2 June 1942; Rio de Janeiro, Brazil
- Died: 19 December 2019 (aged 77); Rio de Janeiro
- Occupation: Anthropologist

Alba Maria Zaluar (2 June 1942 – 19 December 2019) was a Brazilian anthropologist, with emphases in urban anthropology and in anthropology of violence. In 1984, she obtained her PhD in social Anthropology at the Federal University of Rio de Janeiro.

== Biography ==
Daughter of Achilles Emílio Zaluar and of Biancolina Pinheiro Zaluar, Alba was born in Rio de Janeiro, Brazil, where she studied to complete the degree in Social Sciences at the Faculdade National of Filosofia (FNFi). During this period, she became part of the Centre of Popular Culture of the National Union of the Students. Following the Coup d'état in Brazil of 1964, the opening of an investigation of the Military Police started a period of political persecution of the students of the FNFi. Zaluar was forced in 1965 to flee her country and to stay abroad until 1971. She stayed most of this time in England, where she studied Anthropology and urban sociology. After returning to Brazil, she focused her research on the popular culture, especially to the samba and the carnival of Rio de Janeiro.

Zaluar worked as invited professor in the State University of Campinas, and as professor in the Federal University of Rio de Janeiro, where she coordinated the "Núcleo de Pesquisas da Violência" (NUPEVI), located in the Institute of Social Medicine.

Zaluar died on 19 December 2019, in Rio de Janeiro.

== Honours ==
- Visiting scholar, Center for Latin American Studies, University of California
