= Dawn Moncrieffe =

Canadian athlete

Personal information
- Nationality: Afro-Canadian
- Born: 26 January 1968 (age 58) North Lambeth, London, England

Sport
- Country: Canada
- Sport: athletics
Medal record
Deaflympics
| Gold medal – first place | Sofia 1993 | 1500m |
| Silver medal – second place | Sofia 1993 | 3000m |
| Silver medal – second place | Sofia 1993 | 800m |
| Bronze medal – third place | Rome 2001 | 1500m |

Dawn Marie Moncrieffe (born 26 January 1968) is a Canadian female deaf former track and field athlete. She has competed at the Deaflympics representing Canada in 1985, 1993 and in 2001. She had won a total of 4 medals in her Deaflympic career which spanned from 1985 to 2001.

Dawn Moncrieffe was born to a family of African descent on 26 January 1968 in the north of Lambeth, England. She was born profoundly deaf due to the maternal rubella. Her family then migrated to Canada and settled in Winnipeg. Dawn studied and graduated at the Manitoba School for the Deaf which is located in Winnipeg.
