= Alba Sidera =

Catalan journalist and author

- Born: Alba Sidera i Gallart; 3 September 1979 (age 46); Girona
- Occupation: Journalist
- Notable work: Feixisme persistent

Alba Sidera i Gallart (born 1979, Girona) is a Catalan journalist and author, based in Italy. Correspondent of the newspaper El Punt-Avui in Rome since 2012, she is a specialist in the study of far-right movements in Italian politics. As a journalist, she collaborates in various media such as La Directa, Ctxt and Mèdia.cat. She is a member of the Ramon Barnils Group of Journalists.

In 2019, she received an honorable mention from the magazine Pensamiento al margen for her informative article "The trap of post-ideology protects the mediocre" («La trampa de la postideología ampara a los mediocres»), and in 2020 she published her first book, Feixisme persistent, (Persistent Fascism), a journalistic work, the result of years of research in the field in which she explains the survival of fascist ideology, the exaltation of the figure of Mussolini and the rise of the populist politician Matteo Salvini in the Italian peninsula.

== Books ==
- Feixisme persistent (Persistent fascism) (Saldonar, 2020)
