= Giulia Formenton =

Italian canoeist

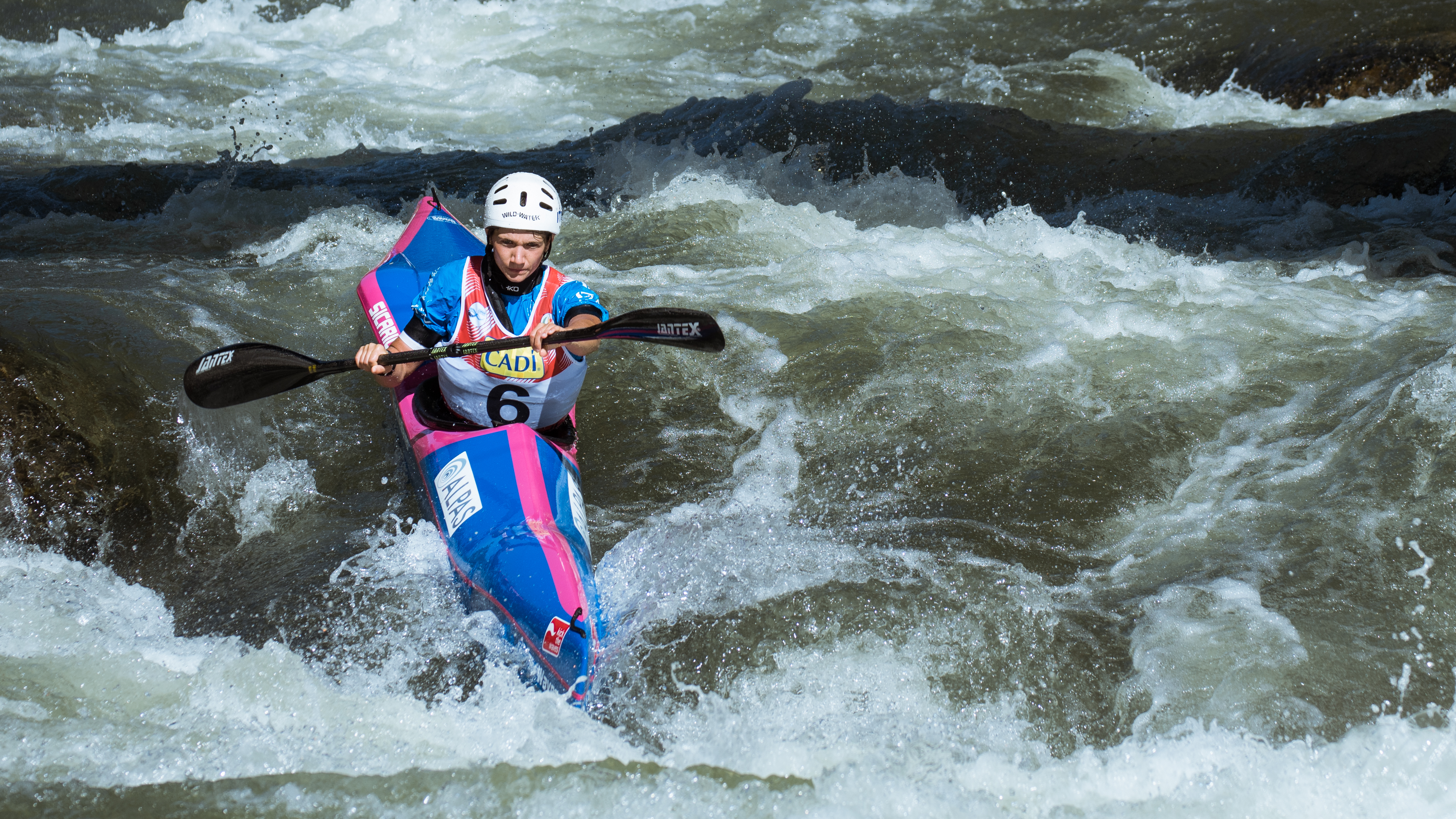
- Formenton in 2019

Personal information
- Nationality: Italian
- Born: 16 March 1998 (age 28) Venice, Italy

Sport
- Sport: Canoeing
- Event: Wildwater canoeing
Medal record
Event	1st	2nd	3rd
World Championships	3	3	0
European Championships	0	3	4
Total	3	6	4

Giulia Formenton (born 16 March 1998) is an Italian female canoeist who won six medals at senior level at the Wildwater Canoeing World Championships.
