= Luka Obadić =

Croatian canoeist

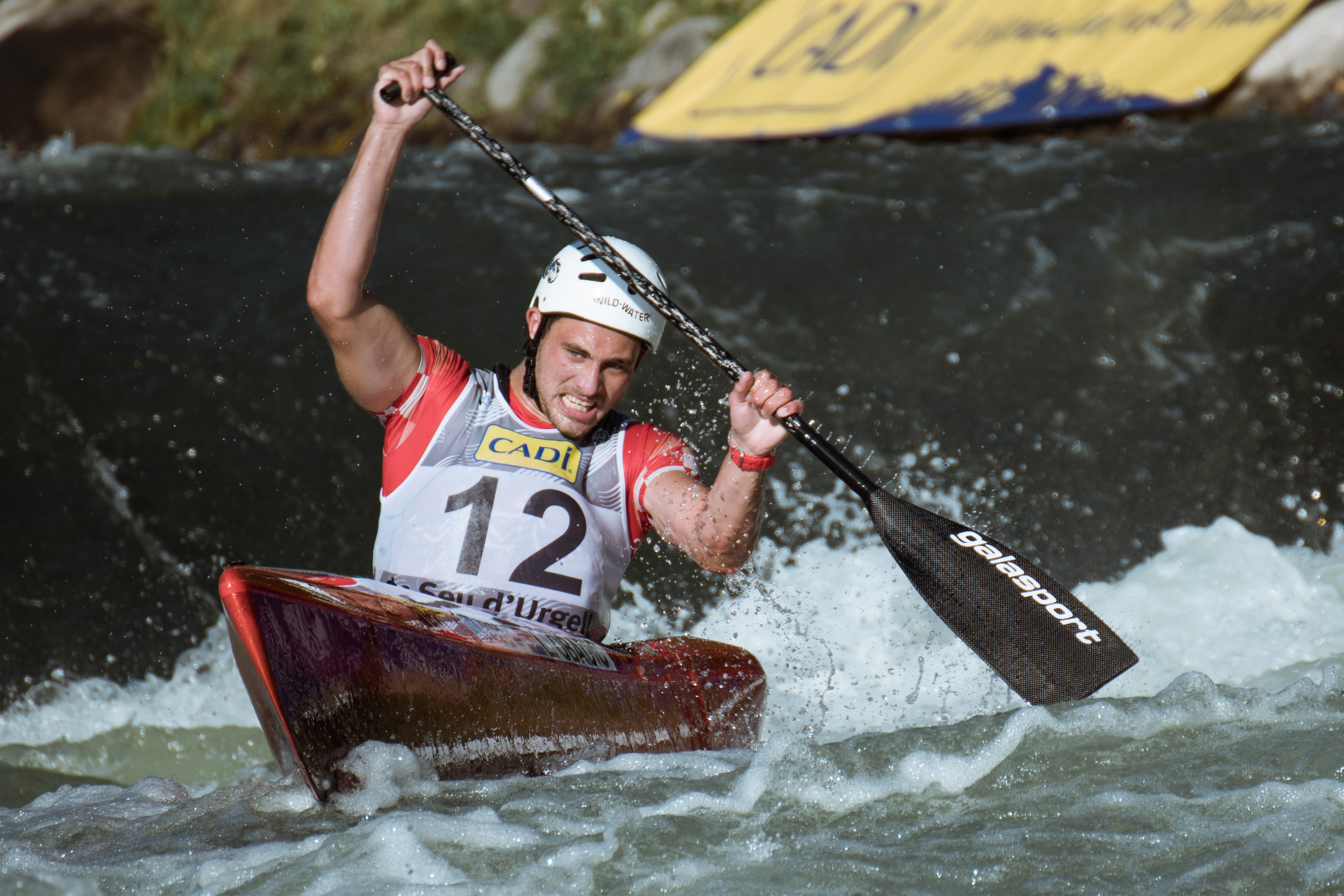
- Obadić in 2019

Personal information
- Nationality: Croatian
- Born: 13 June 1996 (age 30) Croatia

Sport
- Sport: Canoeing
- Event: Wildwater canoeing
Medal record
| Event | 1st | 2nd | 3rd |
|---|---|---|---|
| World Championships | 0 | 1 | 1 |

Luka Obadić (born 13 June 1996) is a Croatian male canoeist who won three medals at senior level at the Wildwater Canoeing World Championships.

== Medals at the World Championships ==
Senior

| Year | 1st place, gold medalist(s) | 2nd place, silver medalist(s) | 3rd place, bronze medalist(s) |
|---|---|---|---|
| 2016 | 0 | 1 | 1 |
| 2019 | 0 | 1 | 1 |
