= Alba Honeywell =

American landowner and politician (1821–1916)

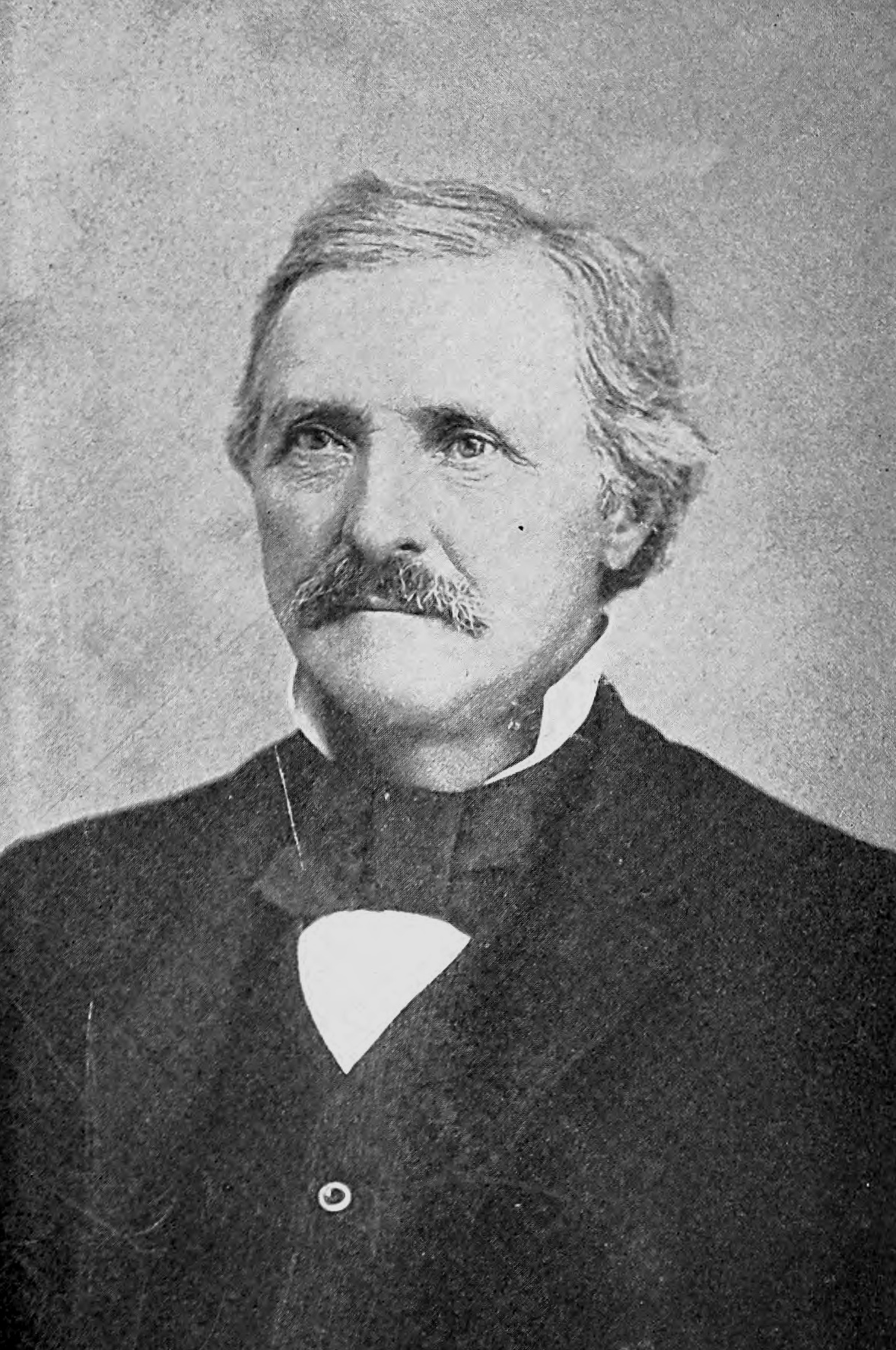

2nd Mayor of Hoopeston
- In office 1879–1880
- Preceded by: Jacob S. McFerren
- Succeeded by: Jacob S. McFerren

Personal details
- Born: December 15, 1821 Cayuga County, New York, U.S.
- Died: February 4, 1916 (aged 94) Hoopeston, Illinois, U.S.
- Resting place: Floral Hill Cemetery; 40.490059°N 87.669657°W
- Party: Republican (1854-1884); Prohibition (1884-1916)
- Spouse: Cornelia Andrews (m. 1851; died 1904)
- Children: 4
- Education: Oneida Institute
- Occupation: Politician; editor; landowner; educator

Alba Honeywell (December 15, 1821 – February 4, 1916) was an American politician, editor, and landowner. He served as the second mayor of Hoopeston, Illinois, from 1879 to 1880.

Born in New York to abolitionist parents, he was educated at Oneida Institute under the preceptorship of Beriah Green. Afterwards, he taught from multiple academic institutions within the community before being appointed delegate for the Buffalo convention. Afterwards, he was employed as editor of many publications, including the National Anti-Slavery Standard before moving to Iroquois County in Illinois, where he then worked as a landowner. He became the mayor of Hoopeston from 1879 to 1880 and finally continued working as a landowner during his final years.

== Early life and education ==
Honeywell was born on December 15, 1821, in Cayuga County, New York, to Enoch Honeywell and Eliza Dye. He was the eldest son out of three children. His ancestry can be traced back to Israel Honeywell, who came from England in 1670 and settled in Westchester County.

His father, Enoch, was a noted anti-slavery activist. Born in Westchester County in 1787, he was mostly educated in the county. When he was an adult, he started engaging in the manufacturing business. He continued engaging in the business until 1816, when he moved to Indiana and bought 160 acres of land in what is now Terre Haute. He worked on his land as a farmer and pork shipper until malaria drove him away and he settled in Cayuga County.

When Honeywell was 12 years old, he and his family moved to a portion of Steuben County which is now incorporated into Schuyler County. He was then educated in the grade schools of Cayuga and Steuben counties, taught at Groton Academy when he was 16, and graduated from the Oneida Institute in Utica under the preceptorship of Beriah Green.

== Career ==
Upon graduating from the Institute, Honeywell became a teacher at several educational institutions within the area. From the beginning of his life, he was noted to be opposed of slavery because of the belief and teachings of his father, and was among the first to actively engage in abolitionism. He served as a delegate for the Buffalo convention, which nominated James G. Birney as the presidential nominee. Subsequently, Honeywell read law in the office of Gilbert & Osborne in Rochester, meeting other abolitionists like Gerrit Smith, William Goodell, and Alvan Stewart.

He then moved to New York City and worked as an editor of the New York Eagle. In 1848, he became associated with the publication Di Anglo-Sacsun by Andrews & Boyle, a paper devoted to the phonetic reform of English spelling. He wrote and edited eleven volumes of a treatise of linguistics while working there. Afterwards, he would then be an active factor of the American Anti-Slavery Society, working as a sub-editor of its publication, the National Anti-Slavery Standard, in 1849. In an interview with The Republican in 1914, Honeywell claimed that he sold the first published copy of Harriet Beecher Stowe's novel Uncle Tom's Cabin while working with the publication, with him selling the book to a man who had been waiting outside the office for several days to buy the book. During this time, he had acquainted with more notable anti-slavery activists like Wendell Phillips and Frederick Douglass.

Because of his deteriorating health, Honeywell was forced to resign from the position in 1853 and instead migrated to the recently formed Iroquois County in Illinois, purchasing 1000 acres in what is now Stockland Township. He resided there for three years teaching, improving the farm and purchasing another 400 acres of land, doing his best to propagate anti-slavery rhetoric to Illinois residents. The Township was formally called Crab Apple but was renamed in 1864 because of Honeywell's suggestion, with the reasoning being unknown.

In the spring of 1856, Honeywell and his family moved to Minnesota Territory, stopping by Chicago during the John C. Frémont's campaign for Presidential nominee, where he worked as an editor at the Chicago News, which was controlled by the Republican Party. He and his family spent the whole winter in the city before moving to Logansport in Indiana, where he would work with lumber. He would also teach in schools within the place and areas in Lafayette.

=== Politics ===
At the start of the American Civil War, Honeywell was offered to become an adjutant of the Union Army, but circumstances arose that made him decline the offer. He returned to his farm in Iroquois County in 1863 and worked as Stockland Township's supervisor continuously until 1869, where he would then be elected county clerk for the next 4 years. During this time, he had purchased soldiers' land warrant and invested largely in Vermilion County property.

In 1871, Honeywell purchased land in what is now Hoopeston and, after his office term ended, moved with his family to the city, where they assisted in the active development of the city, adding two subdivisions to the city plat. He had also secured an extension of the Chicago and Eastern Illinois Railroad into the city. When the three communities were merged to form Hoopeston, railroad officials of the Chicago, Danville and Vincennes Railroad suggested to him to rename the station Honeywell, but he refused, suggesting the name Hoopeston in return.

Honeywell was then elected mayor of Hoopeston in 1879. During his tenure, he served an active role in the improvement of the city. He was interested in the movement for general welfare and the introduction of many business interests which contributed to the development of the city. Some state that Honeywell's tenure made the city saloonless. He assisted in the organization of the sugar corn and canning institutions, where he was connected until they became self-supporting businesses. He He served in the role of mayor until 1880, when he was succeeded by Jacob S. McFerren, the previous mayor of the town.

=== Later life and death ===
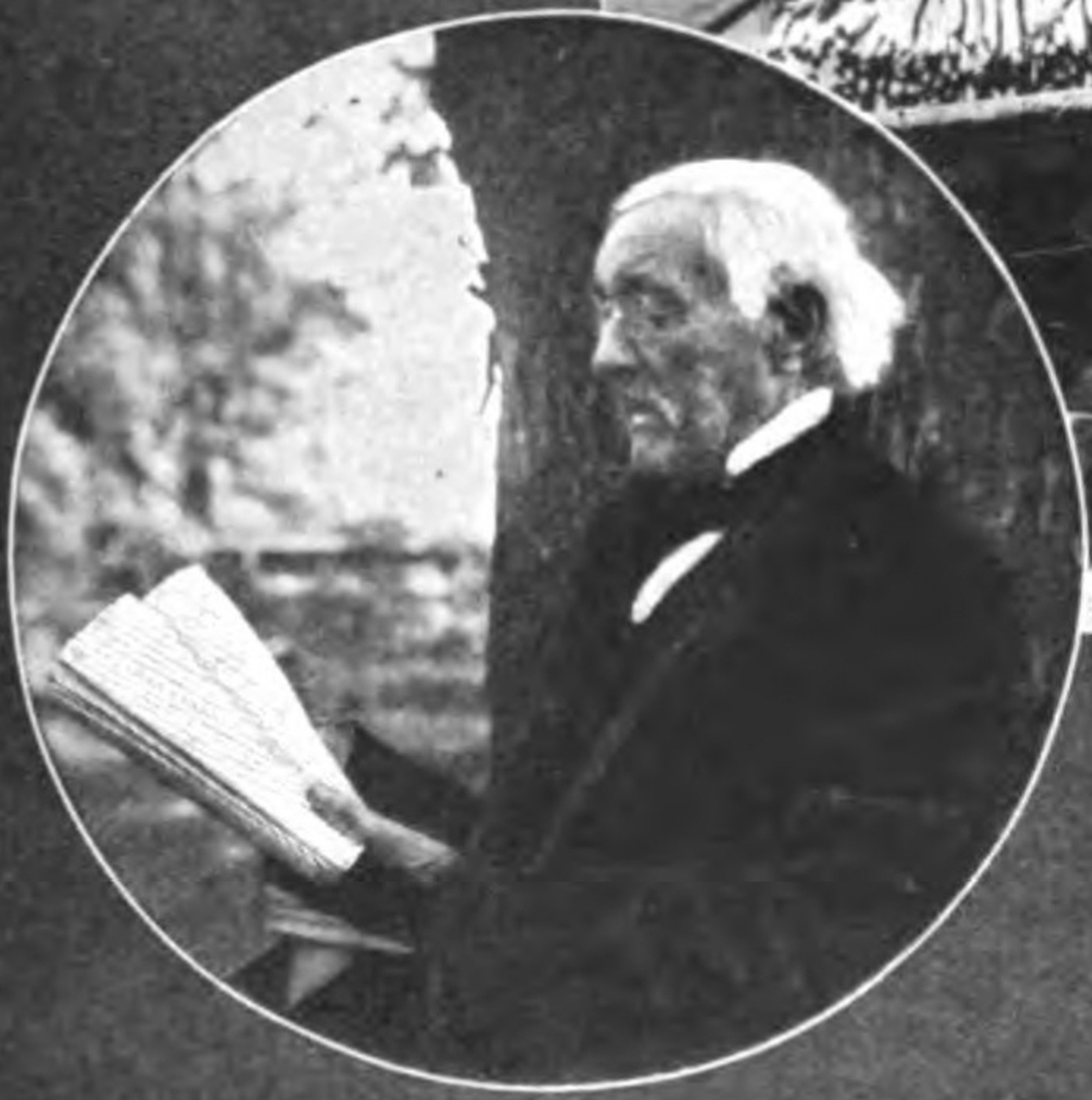
Honeywell at the age of 93

After his tenure as mayor, Honeywell continued working as a farmer on another 1000 acre farm near Hoopeston for cultivation purposes. Because of his efforts, his community saw the benefits as the material increase in land values. He was also one of the founders of the First National Bank of Watseka, where he served as a stockholder and director of the institution for more than 30 years. He had also invested in many lands in other states, owning several hundred acres of land in other counties in Illinois and in Florida. He owned a hotel located near Hygeia Springs in Indiana and a summer home in Lake Bluff as well as his residence in Hoopeston. Honeywell donated the grounds upon which the Hoopeston Carnegie Public Library was built.

Honeywell died on February 4, 1916, due to a stroke in his residence at Honeywell Avenue. He was then interred and buried by the side of his wife at Floral Hill Cemetery in Lovejoy Township. Many avenues in Hoopeston were named after Honeywell.

At the drinking fountain of the Hoopeston Carnegie Public Library, a bronze tablet bears the inscription of people who helped with the foundation of the library, which included Honeywell, the Mary Hartwell Catherwood Club, and Andrew Carnegie.

== Personal life ==
Since the formation of the Republican Party until 1884, Honeywell was one of its staunch advocates. He later became identified with the Prohibition Party. He is said to have commanded respect and confidence whenever he was known. He was also said to be courteous and kind, with people surrounding him having high regard for the man. He was said to have been greatly interested in the Pitman shorthand at one point in his life.

On April 8, 1851, Honeywell married Cornelia Andrews of Sodus Bay, and they had 4 children together. Andrews died in 1904, and Honeywell never remarried.
