= Dawn Freedman =

- Born: 9 December 1942 (age 83)
- Education: University College London
- Occupation: judge

Dawn Angela Freedman (born 9 December 1942) is a British retired judge.

== Biography ==
Freedman attended University College London. At age 37, she became the youngest person to be appointed a stipendiary magistrate. She sat as a judge at Harrow Crown Court. She was a circuit judge from 1991 to 2007. She has served on a panel for the Charity Commission for England and Wales. Freedman was a reviewer of divorce law for the London Beth Din. She is a trustee of Jewish Womens Aid (JWA). Her husband, solicitor Neil Shestopal, died in 2016. She is retired from the circuit court.
