= Dawn M. Scott =

British academic and biologist

Dawn Millicent Scott (born October 1973) is a British wildlife ecologist. She is the Executive Dean for the School of Animal, Rural and Environmental Sciences at Nottingham Trent University since 2021. Previously Scott was Professor of Mammal Ecology and Conservation at the University of Brighton, and was head of life sciences at Keele University since 2019. Scott researches wildlife population ecology, and wildlife–human interactions, and is especially known for her research on the lives of urban foxes.

== Life ==
Scott earned a Bachelor of Science with Honours and a doctorate at the University of Durham. Her doctoral thesis was titled 'Aspects of the ecology of desert-living small mammals'. She also earned a postgraduate certificate in academic practice. She was a lecturer at the University of Brighton from 2001, and in 2014 became head of the division of biology and biomedical sciences. She was appointed full professor in 2018. Scott's research focuses on the ecology of wildlife, especially assessing how wildlife populations respond to environmental change, and human–wildlife relationships.

Scott is the Executive Dean for the School of Animal, Rural and Environmental Sciences at Nottingham Trent University since 2021. Previously Scott was head of life sciences at Keele University since 2019. She has researched the lives of urban foxes.

Scott worked with the Royal Mail to produce a series of ten stamps highlighting urban wildlife, which were released in March 2025. The stamps included images of a fox, blackbird, frog, blue tit, hedgehog, robin and snail.
