= Antonin Hales =

Czech canoeist

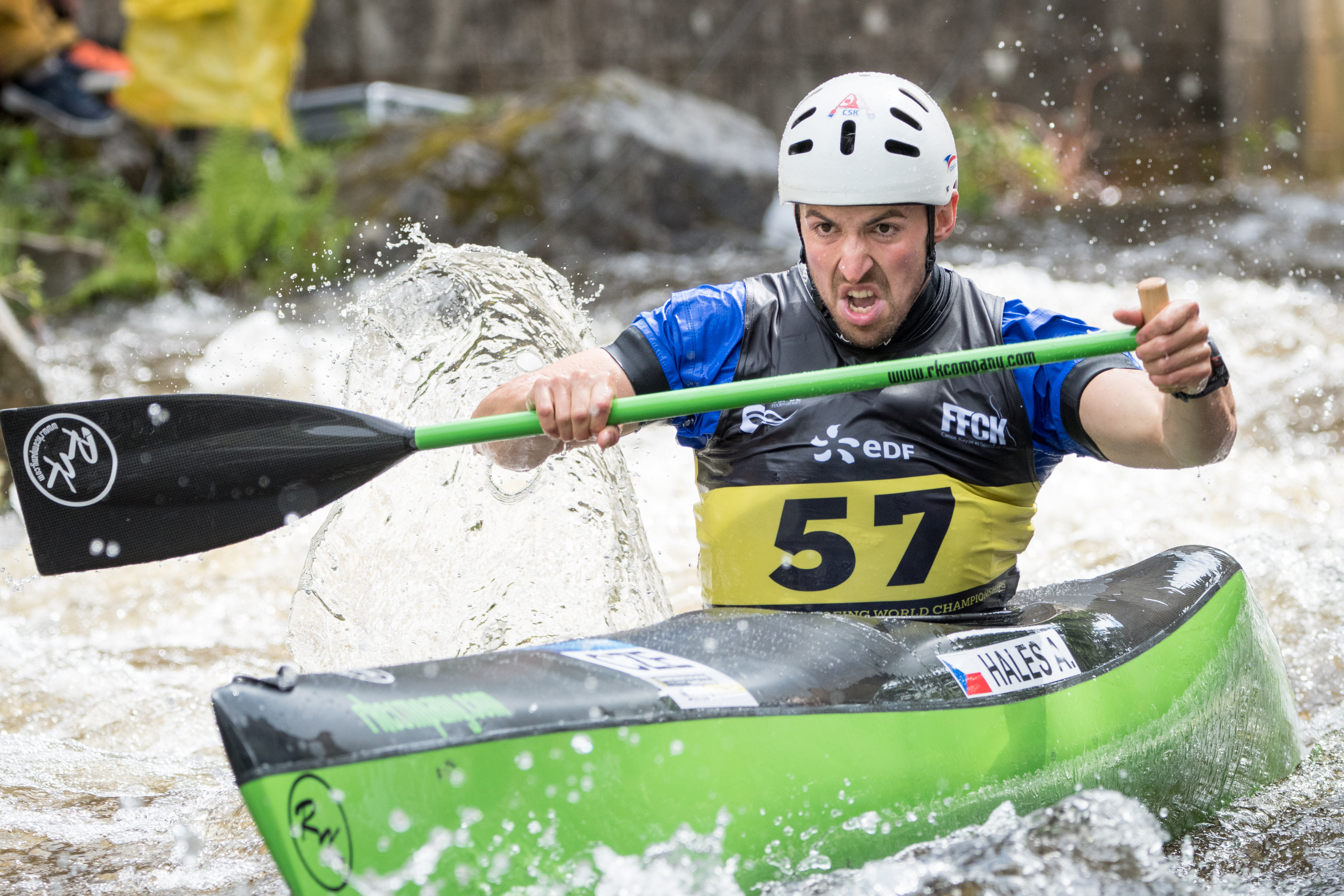

Personal information
- Nationality: Czech
- Born: 9 July 1992 (age 33) Czech Republic

Sport
- Sport: Canoeing
- Event: Wildwater canoeing
Medal record
Event	1st	2nd	3rd
World Championships	4	3	2
European Championships	3	3	1
Total	7	6	3

Antonin Hales (born 9 July 1992) is a Czech male canoeist who won 16 medals at individual senior level at the Wildwater Canoeing World Championships and European Wildwater Championships.
