= Dawn Frank =

American biologist and academic administrator

- Ta Oyate Wiyankapi Win

President of Oglala Lakota College
- Incumbent
- Assumed office July 18, 2022
- Preceded by: Thomas Short Bull

Personal details
- Children: 5
- Education: Oglala Lakota College; South Dakota State University

Dawn Tobacco Frank (Lakota: Ta Oyate Wiyankapi Win) is an American biologist and academic administrator. She is president of the Oglala Lakota College.

== Early life ==
Frank was born to Sylvia Tobacco and Darrell Two Crow. Her Lakota name, Ta Oyate Wiyankapi Win translates to Her People See Her. Frank's maternal grandparents were Stephen “Psin” Tobacco and Caroline Catches Tobacco. Her paternal grandparents were Justin “Judson” Two Crow and Anna “Annie” Chief Eagle-Two Crow. She is a member of the Oglala Sioux and was raised on the Pine Ridge Indian Reservation.

== Education ==
Frank completed elementary and secondary education at Red Cloud Indian School, graduating in 1989. While working and raising her kids, she graduated from Oglala Lakota College (OLC) with an associate's and bachelor's degree (2001) in human services. At OLC, she began a master's degree in Lakota leadership before being accepted into a W. K. Kellogg Foundation funded "Prairie Ph.D." program at South Dakota State University (SDSU) where she earned a Ph.D. in biological sciences from South Dakota State University in 2010. Her dissertation was titled, Integrating Lakota culture and biological science into a holistic research methodology (Lakol wico un na wico han wopasi). She later earned a master's degree in Lakota leadership from OLC.

== Career ==
From 2005 to 2013, Frank was head of the OLC graduate studies department. She served as the OLC vice president of instruction from 2013 to 2022. She became the OLC president on July 18, 2022, succeeding Thomas Short Bull.

== Personal life ==
Frank is married to Albert Frank and has five children. She lives on the Pine Ridge Indian Reservation.
