= Alba Herrera y Ogazón =

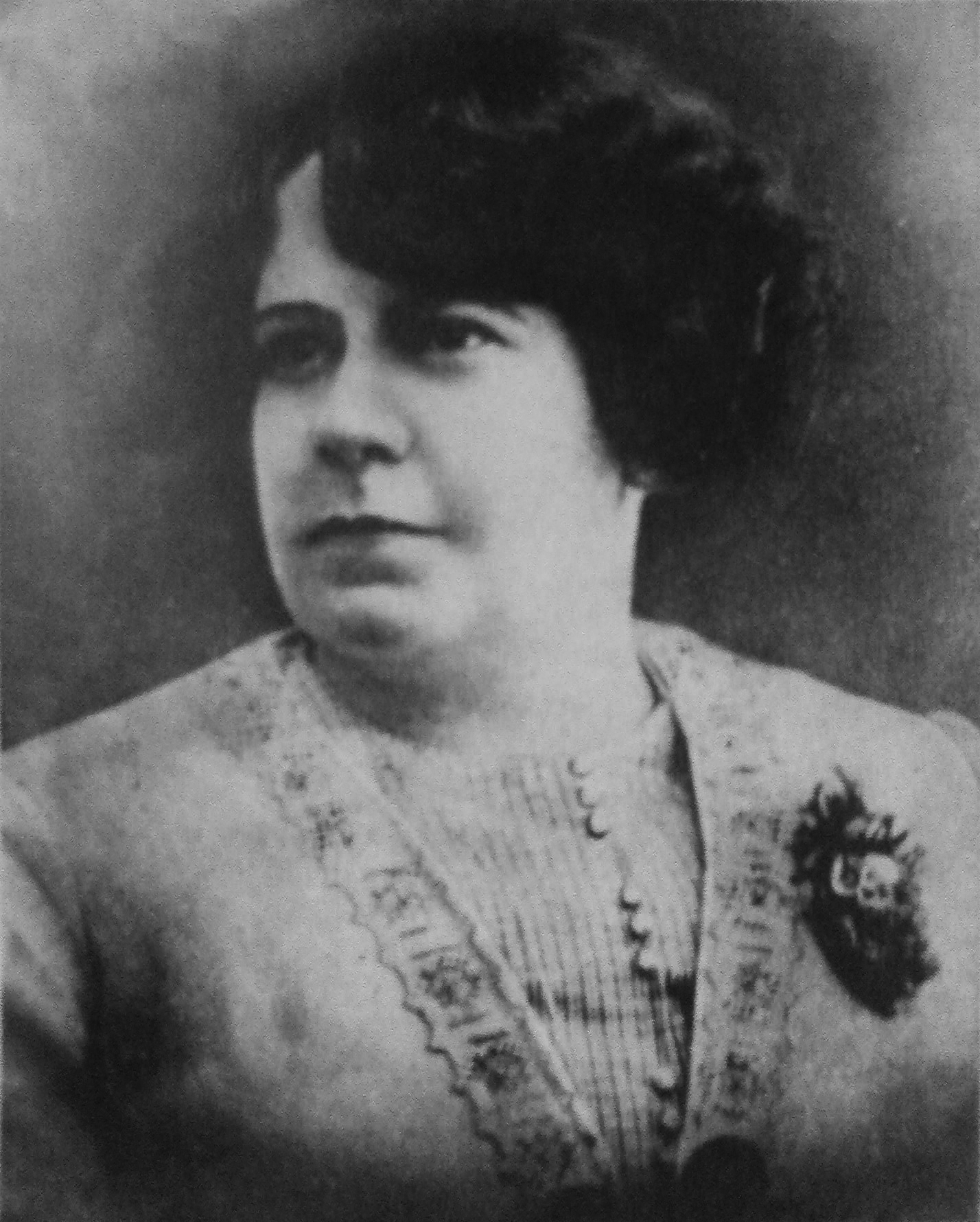

Background information
- Born: 2 February 1885
- Origin: Ciudad de México, México.
- Died: 1931 (aged 45–46)
- Genre: Clásico
- Occupations: Pianista escritora profesora musicóloga periodista
- Instrument: Piano

Alba Herrera y Ogazón (Mexico City, 2 February 1885 – 1931), a Mexican pianist, writer, journalist, teacher she's considered the first female musicologist.

== Early life and education ==
Alba started studying the piano in a young age, with her elder brother, and that defined her Profession. She continued to learn the piano and she was able to perform very complex compositions compared to her age, which made her a special piano player. Alba went to "The English school of Mrs. Miller" and then to the "French School of Mlle. Edges"; she continued her studies in English and French with the help of her father; she showed interest in literature of different writers, specially William Shakespeare.

After completing her higher education, she continued her piano studies with the maestro Carlos J. Meneses who presented her in some recitals. When the master Meneses returned to the National Conservatory, from which it had separated previously, Alba enrolled in the conservatory as well, and continued her classes with him. She also attended the classes of Alberto Villaseñor, her cousin Pedro Luis Ogazon and Ricardo Castro who was the Directorate of the Conservatory at that time. Ricardo Castro frequently changed the piano teachers because of circumstances beyond his control, but this did not prejudice Alba's ability to carry out her studies.

At the end of her piano career at the National Conservatory of Music in 1908, she traveled to New York City and obtained the "B certificate" from the 'Virgil Academy' and she received congratulations from her teacher, Mr. A. K. Virgil.

== Career ==
Considering herself apt to instruct her compatriots, she began teaching music and piano shortly after her return to Mexico following the 'Virgil System'.

In 1910, during his second visit to Mexico, Josef Hofmann asked Alba to translate his book "La Execución Pianística", a task that she subsequently carried out. Without abandoning the musical-pianist art, in 1917, she published her book "The Musical Art in Mexico", in which she summarized the musical movement in Mexico until that year. Later she carried out diverse concerts, some with the National Classic Quartet and others. In 1919, for the first time in Mexico, Alba Herrera y Ogazón with Julian Carrillo played the "Sonatas of Beethoven". Later she undertook a tour in the republic in company with Julián Carrillo the director of the National Symphony Orchestra, and Sante Lo Priore, an Italian violinist.

After she finished her tour in the republic, she published her book "Points of View", that consisted of critic essays in music; the book was circulated in 1921. She then started the preparation of several other books: Mosaicos Musicales, Greorge Eliot, My Miserable Hours and General History of Music.

As a lecturer Alba Herrera y Ogazón participated effectively in the celebration of the centenary of Beethoven, in the conference that was dictated to music, during the time of the romanticism; and was a speaker in the speeches of the inauguration of the Faculty of Music and anniversary, also she taught classes of musical history.

As a journalist, Alba collaborated actively with the Time, The Illustrated World, The Journal, The Tribune, Magazine of Magazines, Pegasus, El Globo, El Universal Ilustrado, El Universal, and others. She also occasionally collaborated with "Excélsior", "Get to Know Mexico", "La Opinión", "Mexican Herald", "Conservatorio", "Tricolor" Sombra "," Cosmos "," New Democracy "(New York) etc., and she was a member of following corporations: Ateneo de México, Society of Local History Studies of Mexico City, Ateneo Hispánico, PEN Grupo Ariel, Sociedad Pro Arte Patrio, International League of Iberian and Hispanic American Women, and the International Society of Pianoforte Teachers and Players, also held the following positions: lecturer in the former department of aesthetic culture of the Secretariat of Public Education (Mexico), during 1922 to 1927; professor of piano and history of the music, in the National Conservatory and in the faculty of music of the National University of Mexico, independent until its death. Alba Herrera y Ogazon died in 1931. She spent her last days writing.
