= Alba Encarnación =

Alba Nidia Encarnación Ayala
- Born: 2 February 1956; Vieques, Puerto Rico
- Died: 11 March 2012 (aged 56); Hato Rey, Puerto Rico
- Other name: "Miss Pupa"
- Occupations: Elementary school teacher, Community Activist

Alba Nidia "Miss Pupa" Encarnación Ayala (2 February 1956 – 11 March 2012) was a sixth-grade public school teacher and community leader in Vieques, Puerto Rico. A devoted Catholic, she always put God first; and that was her foundation, passion and strength for living a life of service to others. She advocated for the rights of the people of Vieques and Puerto Rico in general. She was the voice for better Maritime Transportation and health services which are crucial for the people of Vieques, Women's rights, the poor and the outcast; fought against prejudice, racism and injustice. She also helped lead the movement to end U.S. Navy bombings in the island-municipality and have the lands expropriated by the Navy in the 1940s returned to civilian use. She died on 11 March 2012 in the hospital del Maestro in Vieques, due to complications of diabetes.

Contrary to most leaders in the fight against the use of Vieques lands as a target range and amphibious landing training grounds for Naval and U.S. Marine forces, Encarnación was a supporter of statehood for Puerto Rico, and was highly respected by Puerto Ricans from all political ideologies. In 2008, during a visit by Chelsea Clinton to Vieques, Encarnación, along with then mayor Dámaso Serrano endorsed Hillary Clinton for president and was instrumental in the New York senator's 66% to 34% win over Barack Obama in Vieques. Puerto Rican Independence Party President Rubén Berríos stated that "Puerto Rico lost one of the most prominent leaders and spokespersons in the fight against the Navy on the island of Vieques"

In her honor, Governor Luis G. Fortuño ordered all United States and Puerto Rico flags to fly at half-staff at all public facilities in Puerto Rico on the day of her burial. House Speaker Jenniffer González announced that one of the Maritime Transportation Authority vessels would be named after the late community leader.
