= Spanish women's football clubs in international competitions =

This is a compilation of results for teams representing Spain at international women's football competitions such as the UEFA Women's Cup and its successor, the UEFA Women's Champions League. Spanish clubs have taken part since the inaugural 2001–02 season.

From the 2015–16 season the Spanish league has held two spots in the Women's Champions League. Athletic Bilbao, Barcelona, Espanyol, Levante and Rayo Vallecano have qualified as national champions, and Atlético Madrid and Barcelona as runners-up. So far the most successful team has been Barcelona, having won the competition in 2020–21, in 2022–23 and 2023–24.

== Teams ==
Location of the teams within Spain

These are the eight teams that have representred Spain in the UEFA Women's Cup and the UEFA Women's Champions League.

Club	Autonomy	Location	Apps	First	Last	Best result
Athletic Bilbao	(Basque Country (autonomous community)) Basque Country	Bilbao	5	2003–04	2016–17	Last 16
Atlético Madrid	Community of Madrid	Madrid	7	2015–16	2025–26	Quarterfinals
Barcelona	Catalonia	Barcelona	14	2012–13	2025–26	Winners
Espanyol	Catalonia	Barcelona	1	2006–07	2006–07	Last 16
Levante	Valencian Community	Valencia	5	2001–02	2023–24	Last 16
Rayo Vallecano	Community of Madrid	Madrid	3	2009–10	2011–12	Last 16
Real Madrid	Community of Madrid	Madrid	5	2021–22	2025–26	Quarterfinals
Real Sociedad	(Basque Country (autonomous community)) Basque Country	San Sebastián	1	2022–23	2022–23	Round 2

== Qualification ==
Edition	Competition	Champion	Finalist	Semifinalist #1	Semifinalist #2	
2001–02 UWC	2000–01 Liga Nacional	Levante	Eibartarrak	Pozuelo	Puebla	
Edition	Competition	First	Second	Third	Fourth	Fifth
2002–03 UWC	2001–02 Superliga	Levante (57)	Puebla (51)	Espanyol (37)	Sabadell (32)	Estudiantes Huelva (31)
2003–04 UWC	2002–03 Superliga	Athletic Bilbao (55)	Levante (55)	Puebla (46)	Sabadell (42)	Estudiantes Huelva (38)
2004–05 UWC	2003–04 Superliga	Athletic Bilbao (60)	Sabadell (58)	Levante (58)	Puebla (53)	Torrejón (53)
2005–06 UWC	2004–05 Superliga	Athletic Bilbao (66)	Levante (63)	Espanyol (57)	Torrejón (55)	Híspalis (49)
2006–07 UWC	2005–06 Superliga	Espanyol (60)	Sevilla (60)	Levante (55)	Rayo Vallecano (48)	Athletic Bilbao (41)
2007–08 UWC	2006–07 Superliga	Athletic Bilbao (64)	Espanyol (63)	Levante (55)	Rayo Vallecano (53)	Sevilla (45)
2008–09 UWC	2007–08 Superliga	Levante (71)	Rayo Vallecano (71)	Athletic Bilbao (53)	Espanyol (52)	Torrejón (37)
2009–10 UWCL	2008–09 Superliga	Rayo Vallecano (81)	Levante (76)	Athletic Bilbao (65)	Espanyol (60)	Alcaine Zaragoza (51)
Edition	Competition	Play-off – Champion	Play-off – Finalist	2nd stage – Third	2nd stage – Fourth	2nd stage – Fifth
2010–11 UWCL	2009–10 Superliga	Rayo Vallecano	Espanyol	Athletic Bilbao (29)	Atlético Madrid (18)	Barcelona (17)
2011–12 UWCL	2010–11 Superliga	Rayo Vallecano	Espanyol	Athletic Bilbao (28)	Barcelona (19)	Atlético Madrid (17)
Edition	Competition	First	Second	Third	Fourth	Fifth
2012–13 UWCL	2011–12 1ª División	Barcelona (94)	Athletic Bilbao (91)	Espanyol (76)	Rayo Vallecano (70)	Levante (68)
2013–14 UWCL	2012–13 1ª División	Barcelona (76)	Athletic Bilbao (74)	Atlético Madrid (68)	Levante (65)	Espanyol (54)
2014–15 UWCL	2013–14 1ª División	Barcelona (79)	Athletic Bilbao (69)	Atlético Madrid (54)	Rayo Vallecano (51)	Levante (51)
2015–16 UWCL	2014–15 1ª División	Barcelona (77)	Atlético Madrid (69)	Athletic Bilbao (65)	Valencia (59)	Levante (55)
2016–17 UWCL	2015–16 1ª División	Athletic Bilbao (78)	Barcelona (77)	Atlético Madrid (69)	Levante (54)	Real Sociedad (53)
2017–18 UWCL	2016–17 1ª División	Atlético Madrid (78)	Barcelona (75)	Valencia (68)	Levante (57)	Athletic Bilbao (53)
2018–19 UWCL	2017–18 1ª División	Atlético Madrid (77)	Barcelona (76)	Athletic Bilbao (56)	Granadilla (54)	Valencia (50)
2019–20 UWCL	2018–19 1ª División	Atlético Madrid (84)	Barcelona (78)	Levante (57)	Granadilla (54)	Athletic Bilbao (50)
2020–21 UWCL	2019–20 1ª División	Barcelona (59)	Atlético Madrid (50)	Levante (45)	Deportivo (37)	Athletic Bilbao (35)
2021–22 UWCL	2020–21 1ª División	Barcelona (99)	Real Madrid (74)	Levante (70)	Atlético Madrid (63)	Real Sociedad (61)
2022–23 UWCL	2021–22 1ª División	Barcelona (90)	Real Sociedad (66)	Real Madrid (60)	Atlético Madrid (59)	Granadilla (54)
2023–24 UWCL	2022–23 Liga F	Barcelona (85)	Real Madrid (75)	Levante (66)	Atlético Madrid (57)	Madrid CFF (56)
2024–25 UWCL	2023–24 Liga F	Barcelona (88)	Real Madrid (73)	Atlético Madrid (61)	Levante (60)	Athletic Bilbao (53)
2025–26 UWCL	2024–25 Liga F	Barcelona (84)	Real Madrid (76)	Atlético Madrid (58)	Athletic Bilbao (54)	Granada (45)

== Progression by season ==
Season	Teams	Earlier rounds	Round of 32	Round of 16	Quarterfinals	Semifinals	Final
2001–02 UWC	(Valencian Community) Levante		(Germany) Frankfurt ^{1}				
2002–03 UWC	(Valencian Community) Levante		(England) Arsenal ^{1}				
2003–04 UWC	(Basque Country (autonomous community)) Athletic Bilbao		(Germany) Frankfurt ^{1}				
2004–05 UWC	(Basque Country (autonomous community)) Athletic Bilbao		(Romania) Clujana ^{1}	(Sweden) Djurgården ^{1}			
2005–06 UWC	(Basque Country (autonomous community)) Athletic Bilbao		(Netherlands) Saestum ^{1}				
2006–07 UWC	(Catalonia) Espanyol		(France) Juvisy ^{1}	(Norway) Kolbotn ^{1}			
2007–08 UWC	(Basque Country (autonomous community)) Athletic Bilbao		(Italy) Bardolino ^{1}				
2008–09 UWC	(Valencian Community) Levante		(Czech Republic) Sparta Prague ^{1}	(Denmark) Brøndby ^{1}			
2009–10 UWCL	(Community of Madrid) Rayo Vallecano		(Russia) Rossiyanka				
2010–11 UWCL	(Community of Madrid) Rayo Vallecano		(Iceland) Valur	(England) Arsenal			
2011–12 UWCL	(Community of Madrid) Rayo Vallecano	(Estonia) Pärnu ^{1}	(Finland) PK-35 Vantaa	(England) Arsenal			
2012–13 UWCL	(Catalonia) Barcelona		(England) Arsenal				
2013–14 UWCL	(Catalonia) Barcelona		(Denmark) Brøndby	(Switzerland) Zürich	(Germany) Wolfsburg		
2014–15 UWCL	(Catalonia) Barcelona		(Czech Republic) Slavia Prague	(England) Bristol Academy			
2015–16 UWCL	(Catalonia) Barcelona (1st)		(Kazakhstan) Kazygurt	(Netherlands) Twente	(France) Paris Saint-Germain		
2015–16 UWCL	(Community of Madrid) Atlético Madrid (2nd)		(Russia) Zorky Krasnogorsk	(France) Lyon			
2016–17 UWCL	(Basque Country (autonomous community)) Athletic Bilbao (1st)		(Denmark) Fortuna				
2016–17 UWCL	(Catalonia) Barcelona (2nd)		(Belarus) FC Minsk	(Netherlands) Twente	(Sweden) Rosengård	(France) Paris Saint-Germain	
2017–18 UWCL	(Community of Madrid) Atlético Madrid (1st)		(Germany) Wolfsburg				
2017–18 UWCL	(Catalonia) Barcelona (2nd)		(Norway) Avaldsnes	(Lithuania) Gintra	(France) Lyon		
2018–19 UWCL	(Community of Madrid) Atlético Madrid (1st)		(England) Manchester City	(Germany) Wolfsburg			
2018–19 UWCL	(Catalonia) Barcelona (2nd)		(Kazakhstan) Kazygurt	(Scotland) Glasgow City	(Norway) Lillestrøm	(Germany) Bayern Munich	(France) Lyon
2019–20 UWCL	(Community of Madrid) Atlético Madrid (1st)		(Serbia) Spartak Subotica	(England) Manchester City	(Spain) Barcelona		
2019–20 UWCL	(Catalonia) Barcelona (2nd)		(Italy) Juventus	(Belarus) FC Minsk	(Spain) Atlético Madrid	(Germany) Wolfsburg	
2020–21 UWCL	(Catalonia) Barcelona (1st)		(Netherlands) PSV	(Denmark) Fortuna	(England) Manchester City	(France) Paris Saint-Germain	(England) Chelsea
2020–21 UWCL	(Community of Madrid) Atlético Madrid (2nd)		(Switzerland) Servette Chênois	(England) Chelsea			
2021–22 UWCL	(Catalonia) Barcelona (1st)			(Germany) Hoffenheim ^{1}	(Spain) Real Madrid	(Germany) Wolfsburg	(France) Lyon
2021–22 UWCL	(Community of Madrid) Real Madrid (2nd)		(England) Manchester City	(Ukraine) Zhytlobud-1 Kharkiv ^{1}	(Spain) Barcelona		
2021–22 UWCL	(Valencian Community) Levante (3rd)	(Norway) Rosenborg ^{2}	(France) Lyon				
2022–23 UWCL	(Catalonia) Barcelona (1st)			(Portugal) Benfica ^{1}	(Italy) Roma	(England) Chelsea	(Germany) Wolfsburg
2022–23 UWCL	(Basque Country (autonomous community)) Real Sociedad (2nd)		(Germany) Bayern Munich				
2022–23 UWCL	(Community of Madrid) Real Madrid (3rd)	(England) Manchester City ^{2}	(Norway) Rosenborg	(France) Paris Saint-Germain ^{1}			
2023–24 UWCL	(Catalonia) Barcelona (1st)			(Germany) Eintracht Frankfurt ^{1}	(Norway) Brann	(England) Chelsea	(France) Lyon
2023–24 UWCL	(Community of Madrid) Real Madrid (2nd)		(Norway) Vålerenga	(Sweden) BK Häcken ^{1}			
2023–24 UWCL	(Valencian Community) Levante (3rd)	(Netherlands) Twente ^{2}					
2024–25 UWCL	(Catalonia) Barcelona (1st)			(Sweden) Hammarby ^{1}	(Germany) Wolfsburg	(England) Chelsea	(England) Arsenal
2024–25 UWCL	(Community of Madrid) Real Madrid (2nd)		(Portugal) Sporting CP	(Netherlands) Twente ^{1}	(England) Arsenal		
2024–25 UWCL	(Community of Madrid) Atlético Madrid (3rd)	(Norway) Rosenborg ^{2}					
Season	Teams	Qualifying round	League phase	knockout phase play-offs	Quarterfinals	Semifinals	Final
2025–26 UWCL	(Catalonia) Barcelona (1st)		(England) Arsenal ^{3}		(Spain) Real Madrid	(Germany) Bayern Munich	(France) Lyon
2025–26 UWCL	(Community of Madrid) Real Madrid (2nd)	(Germany) Eintracht Frankfurt	(Norway) Vålerenga ^{3}	(France) Paris FC	(Spain) Barcelona		
2025–26 UWCL	(Community of Madrid) Atlético Madrid (3rd)	(Sweden) BK Häcken	(Norway) Vålerenga ^{3}	(England) Manchester United			

^{1} Group stage. Highest-ranked eliminated team in case of qualification, lowest-ranked qualified team in case of elimination.

^{2} Qualifying tournament. Highest-ranked eliminated team in case of qualification, lowest-ranked qualified team in case of elimination.

^{3} League phase. Highest-ranked advanced team to knockout phase play-offs in case of qualification to quarter-finals, highest-ranked eliminated team in case of qualification to knockout phase play-offs, lowest-ranked qualified team in case of elimination.

== Results by team ==
=== Athletic Bilbao ===
2003–04 UEFA Women's Cup
Round	Opponent	1st	2nd	Agg.	Scorers
Last 32 (group stage)	(Austria) Neulengbach	2–0		3 points	Castrillo – Fernández
Last 32 (group stage)	(Portugal) 1º Dezembro	5–2		6 points	Iturregi 2 – Angulo – Ferreira – Ibarra
Last 32 (group stage)	(Germany) Frankfurt	1–8		6 points	Juaristi

2004–05 UEFA Women's Cup
Round	Opponent	1st	2nd	Agg.	Scorers
Last 32 (group stage)	(Northern Ireland) Newtownabbey Strikers	10–3		3 points	Sánchez 2 – Fernández – Ferreira – Iturregi – Onaindia – Orueta – Vázquez – Zabala
Last 32 (group stage)	(Israel) Maccabi Holon	1–1		4 points	Juaristi
Last 32 (group stage)	(Romania) Clujana (host)	5–0		7 points	Fernández 2 – Vázquez 2 – Orueta
Last 16 (group stage)	(England) Arsenal	2–2		1 point	Iturregi – Vázquez
Last 16 (group stage)	(Sweden) Djurgården/Älvsjö (host)	2–3		1 points	Ferreira – Olabarrieta
Last 16 (group stage)	(Greece) Aegina	5–1		4 points	Vázquez 2 – Fernández – Ibarra – Murua

2005–06 UEFA Women's Cup
Round	Opponent	1st	2nd	Agg.	Scorers
Last 32 (group stage)	(Scotland) Glasgow City	6–2		3 points	Vázquez 3 – Fernández – Gurrutxaga – Juaristi
Last 32 (group stage)	(Belgium) Rapide Wezemaal	3–0		6 points	Fernández – Juaristi – Orueta
Last 32 (group stage)	(Netherlands) Saestum (host)	1–1		7 points	Fernández

2007–08 UEFA Women's Cup
Round	Opponent	1st	2nd	Agg.	Scorers
Last 32 (group stage)	(Slovenia) Krka Novo Mesto (host)	4–0		3 points	Díez – Ferreira – Murua – Vázquez
Last 32 (group stage)	(Malta) Paola Hibernians	16–0		6 points	Vázquez 7 – Juaristi 3 – Olabarrieta 2 – Díez – Iturregi – Murua – Sánchez
Last 32 (group stage)	(Italy) Bardolino	0–1		6 points	

2016–17 UEFA Women's Champions League
Round	Opponent	1st	2nd	Agg.	Scorers
Last 32	(Denmark) Fortuna Hjørring	h: 2–1	a: 1–3 (aet)	3–4	Corres – Oroz – Vázquez

=== Atlético Madrid ===
2015–16 UEFA Women's Champions League
Round	Opponent	1st	2nd	Agg.	Scorers
Last 32	(Russia) Zorky Krasnogorsk	h: 0–2	a: 3–0	3–2	Beltrán – D. García – González
Last 16	(France) Olympique Lyonnais	h: 1–3	a: 0–6	1–9	Calderón

2017–18 UEFA Women's Champions League
Round	Opponent	1st	2nd	Agg.	Scorers
Last 32	(Germany) Wolfsburg	h: 0–3	a: 2–12	2–15	Ludmila

2018–19 UEFA Women's Champions League
Round	Opponent	1st	2nd	Agg.	Scorers
Last 32	(England) Manchester City	h: 1–1	a: 2–0	3–1	Ludmila – Meseguer – Robles
Last 16	(Germany) Wolfsburg	a: 0–4	h: 0–6	0–10	

2019–20 UEFA Women's Champions League
Round	Opponent	1st	2nd	Agg.	Scorers
Last 32	(Serbia) Spartak Subotica	a: 3–2	h: 1–1	4–3	Da Silva 2 – Strom – Torrecilla
Last 16	(England) Manchester City	a: 1–1	h: 2–1	3–2	Corral – Sosa
Quarterfinals	(Spain) Barcelona	0–1			

2020–21 UEFA Women's Champions League
Round	Opponent	1st	2nd	Agg.	Scorers
Last 32	(Switzerland) Servette Chênois	a: 4–2	h: 5–0	9–2	Castellanos 2 – Duggan – Laurent – Ludmila – Sampedro – Santos – Tounkara
Last 16	(England) Chelsea	a: 2–0	h: 1–1	1–3	Laurent

=== Barcelona ===
2012–13 UEFA Women's Champions League
Round	Opponent	1st	2nd	Agg.	Scorers
Last 32	(England) Arsenal	a: 0–3	h: 0–4	0–7	

2013–14 UEFA Women's Champions League
Round	Opponent	1st	2nd	Agg.	Scorers
Last 32	(Denmark) Brøndby	h: 0–0	a: 2–2	2–2	Čanković – Corredera
Last 16	(Switzerland) Zürich	h: 3–0	a: 3–1	6–1	Bermúdez 2 – Čanković – Corredera – R. García – Losada
Quarterfinals	(Germany) Wolfsburg	a: 0–3	h: 0–2	0–5	

2014–15 UEFA Women's Champions League
Round	Opponent	1st	2nd	Agg.	Scorers
Last 32	(Czech Republic) Slavia Prague	a: 1–0	h: 3–0	4–0	Bermúdez – R. García – Putellas – A. Romero
Last 16	(England) Bristol Academy	h: 0–1	a: 1–1	1–2	Losada

2015–16 UEFA Women's Champions League
Round	Opponent	1st	2nd	Agg.	Scorers
Last 32	(Kazakhstan) Kazygurt	a: 1–1	h: 4–1	5–2	Hermoso 2 – R. García – Serrano – Unzué
Last 16	(Netherlands) Twente	a: 1–0	h: 1–0	2–0	O. García 2
Quarterfinals	(France) Paris Saint-Germain	h: 0–0	a: 0–1	0–1	

2016–17 UEFA Women's Champions League
Round	Opponent	1st	2nd	Agg.	Scorers
Last 32	(Belarus) Minsk	a: 3–0	h: 2–1	5–1	Hermoso 3 – Alves – Torrejón
Last 16	(Netherlands) Twente	a: 1–0	h: 4–0	5–0	Alves – Hermoso – Latorre – N'Guessan – Torrejón
Quarterfinals	(Sweden) Rosengård	a: 1–0	h: 2–0	3–0	Caldentey – Hermoso – Ouahabi
Semifinals	(France) Paris Saint-Germain	h: 1–3	a: 0–2	1–5	Latorre

2017–18 UEFA Women's Champions League
Round	Opponent	1st	2nd	Agg.	Scorers
Last 32	(Norway) Avaldsnes	a: 4–0	h: 2–0	6–0	Martens 2 – Alves – Caldentey – Duggan – Losada
Last 16	(Lithuania) Gintra Universitetas	a: 6–0	h: 3–0	9–0	Caldentey 2 – Duggan 2 – Andonova – Bonmatí – O. García – Putellas
Quarterfinals	(France) Olympique Lyonnais	a: 1–2	h: 0–1	1–3	Guijarro

2018–19 UEFA Women's Champions League
Round	Opponent	1st	2nd	Agg.	Scorers
Last 32	(Kazakhstan) Kazygurt	a: 1–3	h: 3–0	4–3	Duggan – Guijarro – Martens – Torrejón
Last 16	(Scotland) Glasgow City	h: 5–0	a: 3–0	8–0	Duggan 2 – Alves – Bonmatí – Guijarro – Hamraoui – León – Putellas
Quarterfinals	(Norway) Lillestrøm	h: 3–0	a: 1–0	4–0	Duggan 2 – Caldentey – Martens
Semifinals	(Germany) Bayern Munich	a: 1–0	h: 1–0	2–0	Caldentey – Hamraoui
Final	(France) Olympique Lyonnais	1–4			Oshoala

2019–20 UEFA Women's Champions League
Round	Opponent	1st	2nd	Agg.	Scorers
Last 32	(Italy) Juventus	a: 2–0	h: 2–1	4–1	Putellas 2 – Torrejón
Last 16	(Belarus) Minsk	h: 5–0	a: 3–1	8–1	Bonmatí 2 – Caldentey – Guijarro – Hermoso – Oshoala – Putellas – Torrejón
Quarterfinals	(Spain) Atlético Madrid	1–0			Hamraoui
Semifinals	(Germany) Wolfsburg	0–1			

2020–21 UEFA Women's Champions League
Round	Opponent	1st	2nd	Agg.	Scorers
Last 32	(Netherlands) PSV	a: 4–1	h: 4–1	8–2	Martens 3 – Hansen 2 – Hermoso – Oshoala
Last 16	(Denmark) Fortuna Hjørring	h: 4–0	a: 5–0	9–0	Hermoso 3 – Bonmatí 2 – Caldentey – Oshoala – Putellas – Torrejón
Quarterfinals	(England) Manchester City	h: 3–0	a: 1–2	4–2	Oshoala 2 – Caldentey – Hermoso
Semifinals	(France) Paris Saint-Germain	a: 1–1	h: 2–1	3–2	Martens 2 – Hermoso
Final	(England) Chelsea	4–0			Bonmatí – Hansen – Putellas

2021–22 UEFA Women's Champions League
Round	Opponent	1st	2nd	Agg.	Scorers
Group stage	(England) Arsenal	h: 4–1	a: 4–0	18 points	Hermoso 2 – Bonmatí – Caldentey – Martens – Oshoala – Putellas – Rolfö
Group stage	(Germany) 1899 Hoffenheim	h: 4–0	a: 5–0	18 points	Putellas 3 – Torrejón 2 – Bonmatí – Crnogorčević – Hermoso – Paredes
Group stage	(Denmark) Køge	a: 2–0	h: 5–0	18 points	Rolfö 2 – Engen – Hermoso – Martens – Ouahabi – Putellas
Quarterfinals	(Spain) Real Madrid	a: 3–1	h: 5–2	8–3	Putellas 3 – Pina 2 – Bonmatí – Hansen – León
Semifinals	(Germany) Wolfsburg	h: 5–1	a: 0–2	5–3	Bonmatí – Hansen – Hermoso – Putellas 2
Final	(France) Olympique Lyonnais	–			

=== Espanyol ===
2006–07 UEFA Women's Cup
Round	Opponent	1st	2nd	Agg.	Scorers
Last 32 (group stage)	(Scotland) Hibernian (host)	4–1		3 points	Martín 2 – Cubí – Serna
Last 32 (group stage)	(France) Juvisy	1–0		6 points	Rubio
Last 32 (group stage)	(Faroe Islands) KÍ	7–0		9 points	Cubí 4 – Martín 2 - Diéguez
Last 16 (group stage)	(Norway) Kolbotn (host)	2–4		0 points	Martín – Miranda
Last 16 (group stage)	(Sweden) Umeå	0–3		0 points	
Last 16 (group stage)	(Ukraine) Lehenda Chernihiv	5–0		3 points	Serna 2 – Cubí – Martín – Rubio

=== Levante ===
2001–02 UEFA Women's Cup
Round	Opponent	1st	2nd	Agg.	Scorers
Last 32 (group stage)	(Germany) Frankfurt (host)	0–1		0 points	
Last 32 (group stage)	(Armenia) Yerevan	17–0		3 points	Jiménez 4 – Prieto 4 – R. Castillo 2 – Gimbert 2 – Monje 2 – Fuentes – del Río – Soler
Last 32 (group stage)	(Moldova) Codru Chisinau	3–1		6 points	Gimbert – Jiménez – Soler

2002–03 UEFA Women's Cup
Round	Opponent	1st	2nd	Agg.	Scorers
Last 32 (group stage)	(Belgium) Eendracht Aalst	8–0		3 points	Fuentes 3 – Jiménez 2 – Prieto 2 – Gimbert
Last 32 (group stage)	(England) Arsenal (host)	1–2		3 points	Prieto
Last 32 (group stage)	(Azerbaijan) Gömrükçü Baku	2–1		6 points	Fuentes – Moreno

2008–09 UEFA Women's Cup
Round	Opponent	1st	2nd	Agg.	Scorers
Last 32 (group stage)	(North Macedonia) Skiponjat (host)	9–0		3 points	Conti 3 – Pérez 3 – Donaire – González
Last 32 (group stage)	(Belgium) Tienen	9–2		6 points	Conti 3 – Donaire 3 – del Río 2 – Vilanova
Last 32 (group stage)	(Czech Republic) Sparta Prague	0–0		7 points	
Last 16 (group stage)	(Denmark) Brøndby	0–1		0 points	
Last 16 (group stage)	(Germany) Duisburg	0–5		0 points	
Last 16 (group stage)	(Ukraine) Naftokhimik Kalush (host)	4–1		3 points	R. Castillo – Pérez – Prim – Ves

2021–22 UEFA Women's Champions League
Round	Opponent	1st	2nd	Agg.	Scorers
Qualifiers (Round 1 SF)	(Scotland) Celtic	2–1			Redondo – Toletti
Qualifiers (Round 1 F)	(Norway) Rosenborg	4–3			Queiroz 2 – Baños – Toletti
Qualifiers (Round 2)	(France) Olympique Lyonnais	h: 1–2	a: 1–2	2–4	Cometti – Crivelari

=== Rayo Vallecano ===
2009–10 UEFA Women's Champions League
Round	Opponent	1st	2nd	Agg.	Scorers
Last 32	(Russia) Rossiyanka	h: 1–3	a: 1–2	2–5	Martín – Pablos

2010–11 UEFA Women's Champions League
Round	Opponent	1st	2nd	Agg.	Scorers
Last 32	(Iceland) Valur	h: 3–0	a: 1–1	4–1	Martín 2 – Hermoso – Pablos
Last 16	(England) Arsenal	h: 2–0	a: 1–4	3–4	Bermúdez – Martín – Pablos

2011–12 UEFA Women's Champions League
Round	Opponent	1st	2nd	Agg.	Scorers
Qualifiers (group stage)	(Republic of Ireland) Peamount United	1–0		3 points	Pablos
Qualifiers (group stage)	(Estonia) Pärnu	4–1		6 points	Hermoso 2 – P. García – Mellado
Qualifiers (group stage)	(Slovenia) Krka Novo Mesto (host)	4–0		9 points	Hermoso 3 – P. García
Last 32	(Finland) PK-35 Vantaa	a: 4–1	h: 3–0	7–1	Pablos 2 – Boho – S. García – Hermoso – Pizarro – Vega
Last 16	(England) Arsenal	h: 1–1	a: 1–5	2–6	Pablos 2

=== Real Madrid ===
2021–22 UEFA Women's Champions League
Round	Opponent	1st	2nd	Agg.	Scorers
Qualifiers (Round 2)	(England) Manchester City	h: 1–1	a: 1–0	2–1	Robles – Zornoza
Group stage	(France) Paris Saint-Germain	a: 0–4	h: 0–2		
Group stage	(Iceland) Breiðablik	h: 5–0	a: 3–0		Møller 3 – Asllani 2 – Carmona – Navarro – Zornoza
Group stage	(Ukraine) Zhytlobud-1 Kharkiv	a: 1–0	h: 3–0	12 points	González – Navarro – Oroz – Peter
Quarterfinals	(Spain) Barcelona	h: 1–3	a: 2–5	3–8	Carmona 2 – Zornoza
