= Sport Mundi Tournament =

Women's football tournament in Spain

The Sport Mundi Tournament is a Spanish pre-season women's football invitational charitable tournament held every August in Irun and Hondarribia since 2005.

It is contested by four teams each year, usually including regional powerhouses Athletic Bilbao and Real Sociedad. Athletic is the most successful team in the competition with four titles, followed by Levante UD and Real Sociedad with two each.

== Honours ==
Year	Champion	Result	Runner-up	Third	Result	Fourth
2005	(Spain) Real Sociedad	?	?	?	?	?
2006	(Spain) Athletic Bilbao	3–1	(Spain) Real Sociedad	(Spain) Txingudi XI	1–0	(Spain) Osasuna
2007	(Spain) Athletic Bilbao	1–0	(Spain) Atlético Madrid	(Spain) Real Sociedad	4–0	(Spain) Mariño
2008	(Spain) Real Sociedad	0–0 (PSO: 5–3)	(Spain) Barcelona	(Spain) Athletic Bilbao	5–0	(Spain) Lagunak
2009	(Spain) Levante	2–1	(Spain) Barcelona	(Spain) Athletic Bilbao	2–1	(Spain) Espanyol
2010	(Spain) Levante	1–0	(Spain) Athletic Bilbao	(Spain) Real Sociedad	1–0	(Spain) Espanyol
2011	(Spain) Athletic Bilbao	4–1	(Spain) Transportes Alcaine	(Spain) Real Sociedad	0–0 (PSO: 5–4)	(Spain) Levante
2012	(Spain) Athletic Bilbao	2–0	(Spain) Real Sociedad	(France) Blanquefort	2–1	(Spain) Osasuna

=== List of finals ===
20 August 2006
12:30

Athletic Bilbao	3–1	Real Sociedad
Juaristi 40'; Vázquez 52'; Rodríguez 65'	Report Archived	? 18'

Gal, Irún

26 August 2007
12:30

Athletic Bilbao	1–0	Atlético Madrid
Díez 11'	Report Archived

Gal, Irún

24 August 2008
12:30

Real Sociedad	0–0 PSO: 5–3	Barcelona
	Report 1 Report 2

Gal, Irún

23 August 2009

Levante	2–1	Barcelona
González 2'; Ves 14'	Report 1 Report 2	? 90'

Gal, Irún

22 August 2010

Levante	1–0	Athletic Bilbao
González 66'	Report 1 Report 2

Gal, Irún

21 August 2011

Athletic Bilbao	4–1	Prainsa Zaragoza
Olabarrieta 2'; Murua 11', 70'; Fernández 16'	Report	Latorre 46'

Gal, Irún

19 August 2012

Athletic Bilbao	2–0	Real Sociedad
Fernández 43'; Vázquez 61'	Report

Gal, Irún
