= 2004 UEFA Women's Under-19 Championship =

Tournament details
- Host country: Finland
- Dates: 28 July – 8 August
- Teams: 8

Final positions
- Champions: Spain (1st title)
- Runners-up: Germany

Tournament statistics
- Matches played: 15
- Goals scored: 56 (3.73 per match)
- Attendance: 7,280 (485 per match)
- Top scorer: (Germany) Anja Mittag (6 goals)
- Best player: (Germany) Anja Mittag

The UEFA Women's U-19 Championship 2004 Final Tournament was held in Finland between 28 July – 8 August 2004. Players born after 1 January 1985 were eligible to participate in this competition. Spain won the cup after defeating Germany 2–1 in the final match.

== Final tournament ==
=== Group stage ===
==== Group A ====
Team	Pld	W	D	L	GF	GA	GD	Pts
Germany	3	3	0	0	15	0	+15	9
Spain	3	2	0	1	7	8	−1	6
Switzerland	3	1	0	2	3	8	−5	3
Finland	3	0	0	3	1	10	−9	0

28 July 2004

Spain	3–1	Switzerland
Diéguez 27'; Murua 48'; Jade 89'	(Report)	Bergara 57' (o.g.)

Loviisan Keskuskenttä, Loviisa
Attendance: 220
Referee: Paula Thörn (Sweden)

28 July 2004

Finland	0–4	Germany
	(Report)	Mittag 36'; Goessling 50'; Laudehr 64'; Behringer 70'

Hyvinkää Sportspark, Hyvinkaa
Attendance: 1,400
Referee: Gordana Kuzmanovic (Serbia)

30 July 2004

Finland	0–4	Spain
	(Report)	Iturregui 29', 48'; Jade 43'; Murua 92'

Kauniainen Sport Park, Kauniainen
Attendance: 850
Referee: Tanja Schett (Austria)

30 July 2004

Germany	4–0	Switzerland
Krahn 40'; Mittag 63', 79', 86'	(Report)

Kauniainen Sport Park, Kauniainen
Attendance: 440
Referee: Cristina Dorcioman (Romania)

2 August 2004

Switzerland	2–1	Finland
Dickenmann 22'; Bürki 56'	(Report)	Laihanen 61'

Loviisan Keskuskenttä, Loviisa
Attendance: 1,530
Referee: Gordana Kuzmanovic (Serbia)

2 August 2004

Germany	7–0	Spain
Aguillera 10' (o.g.); Laudehr 19', 51'; Mittag 39'; Goessling 45'; Krahn 50'; Griessemer 90'	(Report)

Hyvinkää Sportspark, Hyvinkaa
Attendance: 550
Referee: Aušra Tvarijonaitė (Lithuania)

==== Group B ====
Team	Pld	W	D	L	GF	GA	GD	Pts
Italy	3	1	1	1	7	4	+3	4
Russia	3	1	1	1	5	6	−1	4
France	3	1	1	1	4	5	−1	4
Norway	3	1	1	1	2	3	−1	4

28 July 2004

Norway	2–0	France
Giske 21'; Heimlund 79'	(Report)

Hyvinkää Sportspark, Hyvinkaa
Attendance: 450
Referee: Aušra Tvarijonaitė (Lithuania)

28 July 2004

Italy	5–1	Russia
Coppolino 8', 25', 44'; Ricco 52', 82'	(Report)	Danilova 46'

Loviisan Keskuskenttä, Loviisa
Attendance: 340
Referee: Tanja Schett (Austria)

30 July 2004

Norway	0–0	Italy
	(Report)	Ricco (yellow card) 87' (red card)

Kauriala Urheilukenttä, Hämeenlinna
Attendance: 320
Referee: Gordana Kuzmanovic (Serbia)

30 July 2004

France	1–1	Russia
Pele 92'	(Report)	Terekhova 40'

Kauriala Urheilukenttä, Hämeenlinna
Attendance: 460
Referee: Anri Saarivainio Hänninen (Finland)

2 August 2004

Russia	3–0	Norway
Terekhova 1'; Holstad Berge 21' (o.g.); Tsidikova 28'	(Report)

Loviisan Keskuskenttä, Loviisa
Attendance: 390
Referee: Cristina Dorcioman (Romania)

2 August 2004

France	3–2	Italy
Bussaglia 84'; L'huillier 91', 93'	(Report)	Riboldi 35', 70'

Hyvinkää Sportspark, Hyvinkaa
Attendance: 350
Referee: Paula Thörn (Sweden)

=== Knockout stage ===
Semi-finals
Germany	8
Russia	0
Italy	0
Spain	1

Final
Germany	1
Spain	2

==== Semifinals ====
5 August 2004

Germany	8–0	Russia
Kasperczyk 11'; Krahn 49'; Mittag 65'; Goessling 82'; Laudehr 85'; Thomas 90'; Griessemer 91', 93'	(Report)

Kauriala Urheilukenttä, Hämeenlinna
Attendance: 450
Referee: Paula Thörn (Sweden)

5 August 2004

Italy	0–1	Spain
	(Report)	Diéguez 88'

Kauriala Urheilukenttä, Hämeenlinna
Attendance: 490
Referee: Tanja Schett (Austria)

==== Final ====
8 August 2004

Germany	1–2	Spain
Krahn 45+1'	(Report)	Jade 29'; Iturregui 53'

Pohjola Stadion, Vantaa
Attendance: 2,600
Referee: Aušra Tvarijonaitė (Lithuania)

== Awards ==
2004 UEFA Women's Under-19 champions

Spain
First title

== Goalscorers ==
6 goals

- (Germany) Anja Mittag

4 goals

- (Germany) Annike Krahn
- (Germany) Simone Laudehr

3 goals

- (Germany) Lena Goessling
- (Germany) Katharina Griessemer
- (Italy) Serena Coppolino
- (Spain) Jade Boho
- (Spain) Iraia Iturregui

2 goals

- (France) Emilie L'huillier
- (Italy) Penelope Riboldi
- (Italy) Agnese Ricco
- (Russia) Elena Terekhova
- (Spain) Miriam Diéguez
- (Spain) Irune Murua

1 goal

- (Finland) Taru Laihanen
- (France) Elise Bussaglia
- (France) Gwenaelle Pele
- (Germany) Melanie Behringer
- (Germany) Susanne Kasperczyk
- (Germany) Karolin Thomas
- (Norway) Anneli Giske
- (Norway) Tone Røst Heimlund
- (Russia) Elena Danilova
- (Russia) Svetlana Tsydikova
- (Switzerland) Vanessa Bürki
- (Switzerland) Lara Dickenmann

own goals

- (Norway) Nora Holstad Berge (playing against Russia)
- (Spain) Ane Bergara Artieda (playing against Switzerland)
- (Spain) Ana Belen Aguillera Caballero (playing against Germany)
