= Andoni Murúa =

Spanish footballer

Personal information
- Full name: Andoni Murúa Zenarruzabeitia
- Date of birth: 20 March 1953 (age 73)
- Place of birth: Burceña, Spain
- Height: 1.72 m (5 ft 8 in)
- Position: Winger

Youth career
- Athletic Bilbao

Senior career*
Years	Team	Apps	(Gls)
1971–1975	Bilbao Athletic	110	(26)
1975–1977	Sestao		
1977–1979	Levante		
1979–1981	Almería	53	(16)
1981–1983	Español	51	(13)
1983–1985	Racing Santander	42	(4)
1985–1986	Sestao	1	(0)
- * Club domestic league appearances and goals

Andoni Murúa Zentarruzabeitia (born 20 March 1953) is a Spanish retired footballer who played mainly as a left winger.

He appeared in 121 La Liga games over the course of five seasons, scoring 29 goals.

== Club career ==
Born in the village of Burceña, in Barakaldo, Biscay, Murúa emerged through Basque Country giants Athletic Bilbao's youth system. He spent four seasons with the reserve team in the third division, but could not break into the first team as he was barred by Txetxu Rojo, moving to another club in that tier and his native region, Sestao Sport Club.

In the summer of 1977, Murúa signed with Levante UD also in the third level – renamed Segunda División B shortly before – helping to promotion to division two in his second year with a career-best 38 goals. He played six games in the following season scoring twice, before moving in late 1979 to La Liga with AD Almería, coached by former Athletic great José María Maguregui: on 21 October of that year he made his debut in the competition, playing the full 90 minutes in a 0–0 home draw against Real Sociedad, and finished the campaign with 11 goals; this included a brace in a 4–2 success over former team Athletic Bilbao, on 30 December.

After a further two seasons in the top flight with RCD Español, Murúa returned to division two and joined Racing de Santander, promoting to the former competition in 1984 (25 matches, four goals); on both occasions, he was managed by Maguregui.

Murúa retired from professional football in 1986 at the age of 33, playing with his first team Sestao in the second division.

== International career ==
Murua did not earn any caps for Spain. He was pre-selected by László Kubala for the 1982 FIFA World Cup which was played on home soil, while playing with Almería, but did not make the final list.

== Personal life ==
Murúa's younger brother Edorta (ten years his junior) was also a footballer. A defender, he too played with Bilbao Athletic and Sestao (coinciding with his sibling in the latter as Andoni was playing his final year), and appeared in two top level seasons with Real Oviedo (1988 to 1990).

Murúa's daughter, Irune, also represented Athletic Bilbao.
