= Garazi Fácila =

Spanish footballer (born 1999)

Personal information
- Full name: Garazi Fácila Giralte
- Date of birth: 25 October 1999 (age 27)
- Place of birth: Lodosa, Spain
- Height: 1.63 m (5 ft 4 in)
- Position: Defender

Team information
- Current team: Athletic Club
- Number: 12

Youth career
- CD Lodosa

Senior career*
Years	Team	Apps	(Gls)
2013–2014	AF Calahorra		
2014–2018	Pradejón		
2016–2017	→ Mariño Irun (loan)		
2018–2021	Osasuna	40+	(0+)
2021–2023	Alavés	47	(0)
2023–	Athletic Club	31	(0)
- * Club domestic league appearances and goals as of 25 July 2025

Garazi Fácila Giralte (born 25 October 1999) is a Spanish footballer who plays as a defender for Athletic Club. She previously played for Pradejón, Osasuna and Alavés.

== Career ==
Fácila started her career at AF Calahorra.

In 2023 she joined Athletic Club on a three-year contract.
