= Iñaki Goirizelaia =

Professor

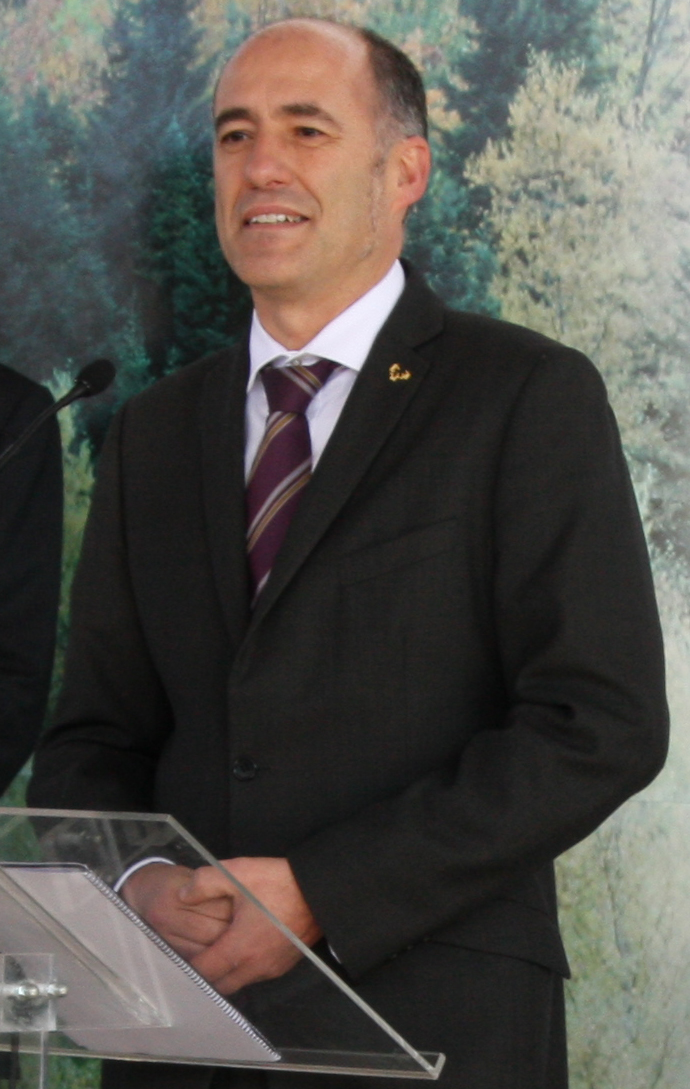
- Goirizelaia as speaker
- Born: Joseba Iñaki Goirizelaia Ordorika; May 2, 1958 (age 68); Bilbo, Basque Country
- Education: University of the Basque Country; Stanford Research Institute
- Known for: President of the University of the Basque Country (2009–2017)
- Scientific career
- Fields: Telecommunication Engineering, artificial intelligence, artificial vision
- Thesis: Partially Visible Part Recognition via Artificial Vision in Industrial Environments (1988)

Iñaki Goirizelaia, PhD (Bilbo, 1958 – ) is a full professor of Telecommunication Engineering at the University of the Basque Country in the Department of Communication Engineering. In 1981 he began his work as a professor at the Faculty of Engineering of Bilbao. He is the former President of the University of the Basque Country (2009–2017). Previously, he was Vice-president of the Campus of Biscay of the same university (2005–2008).

== Presidency of the University of the Basque Country ==
He was elected as President of the University of the Basque Country on December 4, 2008. He was reelected in December 2012 as an unopposed candidate. So far, he is the only professor to complete two terms as the university's president.

Despite his position in times of serious economic crisis, he achieved important milestones in teaching infrastructures, research, education and use of the Basque language in the university. At the end of his second term, when he left the office of President of the University of the Basque Country, he asked political representatives for a new Law of the Basque University System that provides more autonomy to the University of the Basque Country to manage it and guarantees public funding.

After his two terms were completed, he was replaced by the new elected president Nekane Balluerka.

Starting in 2007 he worked actively in the attainment of the .eus Internet domain. He is a member of the .eus Foundation which was created, once ICANN (Internet Corporation for Assigned Names and Numbers) approved .eus domain, to promote and provide the backbone to the Basque language and culture community in Internet. At the beginning of 2017 he was elected president of .eus Foundation replacing Joan Mari Torrealdai. He is a Basque traditional folk dancer and in some academic events, in addition to the word, he used dance to convey his messages. He is currently the director of the Amilotx Folk Dance group (Mungia, Basque Country).

== Academic career ==
Between 1984 and 1985 he was a visiting fellow at the Stanford Research Institute (SRI) in California (United States), where he focused on research in the field of artificial intelligence and artificial vision. This work was the basis of his doctoral thesis, entitled "Partially Visible Part Recognition via Artificial Vision in Industrial Environments" in 1987. It was written in Basque language.

For the latter half of 2004, he was a visiting professor at the Media Lab at the Massachusetts Institute of Technology (MIT). There, he conducted research in technology for electronic and Internet voting systems.

In February 2017 he was appointed the first visiting professor in the Eloise Garmendia Bieter at Boise State University (BSU) where he taught a course under the title "Nation making: Education, Science and Media".

== Textbooks in Basque language ==
Goirizelaia was one of the first authors in the area of Telecommunication Engineering to publish textbooks and teaching materials in Basque. In 1999 he published the Basque-language (English: Fundamentals of Programming). In 2011 he was co-author with Maider Huarte and Purificación Saiz of Basque-language books Telekomunikazio-sare eta zerbitzuak: Teoria (English: Telecommunication Networks and Services: Theory) and Telekomunikazio-sare eta zerbitzuak: Ariketa ebatziak (English: Telecommunication Networks and Services: Problems Solved).

== Research and knowledge transfer ==
Throughout his academic career, Goirizelaia has worked on three main research lines: artificial vision, electronic voting and network security. He is currently a member of the I2T Telematic Engineering Research Group based at the Faculty of Engineering at the University of the Basque Country in Bilbao, where he has been the supervisor of six doctoral theses, and co-author of 14 papers published in international journals, 19 published in Spanish journals, three book chapters for international publishing houses, 23 papers for international congresses and 24 for domestic congresses.

He holds two international patents and two Spanish patents. All of them were used to manufacture new products that were commercialized by companies.

In 1986 he set up the company Adicorp, S.A. with a view to commercially exploiting the results of his doctoral thesis in the field of artificial vision. The company did business until 1993, in the field of industrial applications of artificial vision. When Adicorp, S.A. was wound up the workers set up a new company under the name IKUSMEN, S.L. which continues to do business in the same market today.
