= 2020–21 Primera División (women) =

Spanish women's 1st tier association football season

Primera División
- Season: 2020–21
- Dates: 3 October 2020 – 27 June 2021
- Teams: 18
- Champions: Barcelona; 6th title
- Relegated: Santa Teresa; Espanyol; Logroño; Deportivo
- Champions League: Barcelona; Real Madrid; Levante
- Matches: 306
- Goals: 945 (3.09 per match)
- Top goalscorer: Jenni Hermoso (31 goals)
- Biggest home win: Barcelona 9–0 Santa Teresa; Barcelona 9–0 Deportivo
- Biggest away win: Deportivo 1–8 Atlético de Madrid; Espanyol 1–8 Real Madrid
- Highest scoring: Barcelona 9–1 Eibar
- Longest winning run: Barcelona (28 matches)
- Longest unbeaten run: Barcelona (28 matches)
- Longest winless run: Logroño (10 matches)
- Longest losing run: Betis (8 matches); Deportivo (8 matches)
- All statistics correct as of 27 June 2021.

The 2020–21 Primera División Femenina de Fútbol was the 33rd edition of Spain's highest women's football league, the 20th since the inception of the Superliga Femenina. The league was scheduled to start on 5 September 2020 and to finish on 27 June 2021, however, the start date was delayed to 3 October.

Barcelona were the defending champions after the previous season ended after 21 games due to the COVID-19 pandemic in Spain. They retained their title emphatically, dropping only 3 points all season (a defeat by Atlético Madrid after already being declared champions), and also won the Copa de la Reina and UEFA Women's Champions League competitions.

== Teams ==
Location of the 2020–21 Primera División teams
Location of Community of Madrid teams in 2020–21 Primera División
Canary Islands location of the 2020–21 Primera División teams

Eibar and Santa Teresa promoted from Segunda División Pro. Tacón changed its name to Real Madrid after being absorbed by the namesake club.

=== Stadia and locations ===
Team	Home city	Stadium	Capacity
Athletic Club	Bilbao	Instalaciones de Lezama	3,200
Atlético de Madrid	Madrid	Centro Deportivo Wanda	2,500
Barcelona	Barcelona	Johan Cruyff	6,000
Betis	Seville	Luis del Sol	1,300
Deportivo	A Coruña	Cidade Deportiva de Abegondo	1,000
Eibar	Eibar	Unbe	500
Espanyol	Barcelona	Dani Jarque	2,500
Granadilla	Granadilla de Abona	La Palmera	2,700
Levante	Valencia	Campo Municipal El Terrer	600
Logroño	Logroño	Las Gaunas	16,250
Madrid CFF	San Sebastián de los Reyes	Estadio Matapiñonera	3,500
Rayo Vallecano	Madrid	Ciudad Deportiva	2,500
Real Madrid	Madrid	Ciudad Real Madrid - Campo 11	400
Real Sociedad	San Sebastián	Zubieta	2,500
Santa Teresa	Badajoz	Nuevo Vivero	15,198
Sevilla	Seville	Jesús Navas	5,000
Sporting de Huelva	Huelva	Nuevo Colombino	21,670
Valencia	Valencia	Antonio Puchades	3,000

=== Personnel and sponsorship ===
Team	Head coach	Captain	Kit manufacturer	Main shirt sponsor
Athletic Club	Iraia Iturregi		New Balance	Kutxabank
Atlético de Madrid	Dani González	Amanda Sampedro	Nike	Herbalife
Barcelona	Lluís Cortés	Vicky Losada	Nike	Stanley
Betis	Juan Carlos Amorós	Irene Guerrero	Kappa	Betway
Deportivo	Manu Sánchez	Míriam Ríos	Macron	Abanca
Eibar	Iker Dorronsoro	Sheila Elorza	Joma	Euskaltel
Espanyol	Rubén Casado	Paloma Fernández	Kelme	Ilumax
Granadilla	Francis Díaz	Cindy García	Erreà	Egatesa
Levante	María Pry	Alharilla Casado	Macron	Germaine de Capuccini
Logroño	Javier Moncayo	Rebeca Moreno	Joma	Gesitma
Madrid CFF	Óscar Fernández	Paola Ulloa	Adidas	Casino Gran Madrid
Rayo Vallecano	Carlos Santiso	Alicia Gómez	Kelme	
Real Madrid	David Aznar	Ivana Andrés	Adidas	Emirates - Fly Better
Real Sociedad	Natalia Arroyo	Nahikari Garcia	Macron	Euskaltel
Santa Teresa	Miguel Ángel Quejigo		Kappa	Civitas Pacensis
Sevilla	Cristian Toro	Alicia Fuentes	Nike	Marathonbet
Sporting de Huelva	Jenny Benítez	Anita Hernández	John Smith	Huelva
Valencia	José López Bargues	Gio Carreras	Puma	Teika

=== Managerial changes ===
Team	Outgoing manager	Date of vacancy	Manner of departure	Position in table	Incoming manager	Date of appointment
Real Sociedad	Gonzalo Arconada	18 May 2020	End of contract	Pre-season	Natalia Arroyo	30 May 2020
Espanyol	Jordi Ferrón	30 Jun 2020	Sacked	Pre-season	Rubén Casado	27 Jul 2020
Sporting de Huelva	Antonio Toledo	2 Nov 2020	Resigned	18th	Jenny Benítez	3 Nov 2020
Logroño	Gerardo García	15 Dec 2020	Sacked	18th	Javier Moncayo	16 Dec 2020
Betis	Pier Luigi Cherubino	28 Dec 2020	Resigned	17th	Juan Carlos Amorós	15 Jan 2021
Athletic Club	Angel Villacampa	7 Jan 2021	Resigned	11th	Iraia Iturregi	8 Jan 2021

== League table ==
=== Standings ===
Pos	Team	Pld	W	D	L	GF	GA	GD	Pts	Qualification or relegation
1	Barcelona (C)	34	33	0	1	167	15	+152	99	Qualification for the Champions League group stage
2	Real Madrid	34	23	5	6	75	33	+42	74	Qualification for the Champions League second round
3	Levante	34	21	7	6	68	44	+24	70	Qualification for the Champions League first round
4	Atlético de Madrid	34	18	9	7	61	32	+29	63	
5	Real Sociedad	34	18	7	9	66	44	+22	61	
6	Granadilla	34	17	7	10	58	46	+12	58	
7	Madrid CFF	34	16	5	13	49	44	+5	53	
8	Sevilla	34	12	9	13	42	50	−8	45	
9	Valencia	34	11	11	12	51	60	−9	44	
10	Sporting de Huelva	34	12	8	14	37	48	−11	44	
11	Athletic Club	34	11	7	16	43	60	−17	40	
12	Betis	34	9	8	17	34	62	−28	35	
13	Rayo Vallecano	34	8	10	16	37	58	−21	34	
14	Eibar	34	9	6	19	32	62	−30	33	
15	Deportivo (R)	34	8	5	21	39	81	−42	29	Relegation to Segunda División
16	Espanyol (R)	34	6	7	21	31	70	−39	25	Relegation to Segunda División
17	Logroño (R)	34	5	9	20	32	60	−28	24	Relegation to Segunda División
18	Santa Teresa (R)	34	6	6	22	23	76	−53	24	Relegation to Segunda División

Source: RFEF
Rules for classification: 1) points; 2) head-to-head points; 3) goal difference; 4) number of goals scored
(C) Champions; (R) Relegated

=== Results ===
Home \ Away	ATH	ATM	BAR	BET	DEP	EIB	ESP	GRA	LEV	LOG	MAD	RAY	RMA	RSO	STE	SEV	SPH	VAL
Athletic Club	—	3–3	0–4	2–2	2–1	0–1	3–0	2–2	0–2	2–1	2–0	0–0	1–3	2–1	2–1	2–0	1–1	2–0
Atlético de Madrid	3–1	—	4–3	4–1	1–1	2–1	4–1	1–1	1–0	2–0	0–1	0–0	0–1	3–2	0–1	3–0	0–0	4–1
Barcelona	8–0	3–0	—	6–0	9–0	9–1	5–0	6–1	7–1	6–0	3–2	7–0	4–1	5–1	9–0	6–0	5–0	5–0
Betis	1–0	0–4	0–5	—	3–1	0–0	0–0	1–2	0–2	1–3	1–2	1–1	0–3	2–2	1–2	0–2	2–0	2–1
Deportivo	3–0	1–8	1–6	1–3	—	0–0	2–1	1–1	1–3	2–1	3–0	3–0	0–2	0–2	1–2	1–2	1–0	1–1
Eibar	2–5	0–1	0–3	1–0	2–4	—	0–1	2–1	0–2	2–0	0–1	0–0	1–3	2–2	2–0	1–3	1–3	0–1
Espanyol	2–1	0–2	2–3	2–1	3–2	0–1	—	2–3	1–1	1–0	3–3	2–2	1–8	0–4	1–2	0–3	1–1	1–1
Granadilla	3–2	2–2	0–1	3–1	4–1	2–1	2–0	—	0–2	2–0	0–1	2–0	2–1	1–2	3–1	2–0	1–1	2–1
Levante	4–0	3–0	0–3	1–1	4–1	2–2	1–0	1–0	—	3–2	4–2	5–1	1–2	3–2	1–1	2–1	2–2	1–1
Logroño	3–0	0–2	0–2	0–1	3–0	1–2	1–1	2–1	1–2	—	2–2	2–1	0–4	0–2	2–2	0–0	1–1	2–2
Madrid CFF	1–0	0–1	0–2	2–2	1–1	3–1	0–1	2–4	2–3	2–0	—	2–1	0–2	1–0	4–0	1–0	1–0	4–1
Rayo Vallecano	2–3	1–1	0–4	1–0	3–1	3–0	2–0	2–3	1–1	0–0	1–4	—	0–3	1–2	5–0	3–2	1–0	3–3
Real Madrid	1–0	0–1	0–4	1–1	3–0	2–0	4–1	1–1	1–2	2–0	2–0	3–1	—	3–2	1–0	5–2	1–1	3–1
Real Sociedad	1–0	0–0	1–4	5–1	2–0	0–1	1–0	1–2	3–2	3–1	1–1	2–0	3–1	—	4–1	2–2	1–0	2–2
Santa Teresa	2–2	0–2	0–3	0–2	0–3	2–0	1–0	0–1	0–2	1–1	0–3	0–1	1–5	0–4	—	1–1	0–1	0–1
Sevilla	0–2	3–2	0–4	2–0	3–1	0–1	2–1	2–1	1–0	0–0	0–1	0–0	1–1	1–1	1–1	—	4–0	0–0
Sporting de Huelva	1–0	1–0	0–6	0–1	3–0	2–2	2–1	2–1	1–2	3–1	1–0	1–0	0–1	1–2	2–1	4–2	—	1–2
Valencia	1–1	0–0	0–7	1–2	3–0	4–2	2–1	2–2	1–1	3–2	2–0	1–0	1–1	1–3	5–0	1–2	3–1	—

Source: RFEF
Legend: Blue = home team win; Yellow = draw; Red = away team win.

=== Positions by round ===
The table lists the positions of teams after each week of matches. In order to preserve chronological evolvements, any postponed matches are not included to the round at which they were originally scheduled, but added to the full round they were played immediately afterwards.

Team ╲ Round	1	2	3	4	5	6	7	8	9	10	11	12	13	14	15	16	17	18	19	20	21	22	23	24	25	26	27	28	29	30	31	32	33	34
Barcelona	1	1	1	1	2	3	2	3	3	2	3	1	1	1	1	1	1	1	1	1	1	1	1	1	1	1	1	1	1	1	1	1	1	1
Real Madrid	18	13	12	13	7	5	6	5	4	4	2	3	2	2	2	2	2	3	3	3	3	3	3	3	3	3	3	3	3	2	2	2	2	2
Levante	4	4	7	12	13	13	11	9	6	6	6	6	5	4	3	4	3	2	2	2	2	2	2	2	2	2	2	2	2	3	3	3	3	3
Atlético de Madrid	2	3	2	2	1	1	3	2	1	3	5	4	3	5	5	3	4	4	4	4	4	5	5	7	7	7	7	7	7	7	6	5	4	4
Real Sociedad	11	8	4	8	5	7	4	4	5	5	4	5	6	6	6	7	6	6	6	7	6	6	6	5	5	4	4	4	4	4	4	4	5	5
Granadilla	16	11	10	5	4	2	1	1	2	1	1	2	4	3	4	5	7	7	7	6	7	7	7	6	6	5	5	5	5	6	5	6	6	6
Madrid CFF	7	9	5	3	6	8	9	11	9	7	7	7	7	8	9	6	5	5	5	5	5	4	4	4	4	6	6	6	6	5	7	7	7	7
Sevilla	9	12	13	10	12	9	10	7	8	10	8	8	8	7	7	8	8	8	8	8	8	8	8	8	8	8	8	8	8	8	9	9	9	8
Valencia	5	7	8	11	10	6	8	6	7	8	10	11	9	9	10	10	9	9	9	9	9	9	10	9	10	10	10	10	10	10	8	8	8	9
Sporting de Huelva	14	15	18	18	18	16	16	16	17	17	14	13	15	15	14	14	15	16	16	14	13	13	11	11	11	11	11	11	11	11	10	10	10	10
Athletic Club	3	2	3	4	3	4	5	8	10	9	9	9	10	11	12	11	11	12	11	12	12	10	9	10	9	9	9	9	9	9	11	11	11	11
Betis	15	16	14	14	14	14	13	13	14	14	15	18	17	17	17	17	17	17	17	17	15	17	18	15	15	15	15	14	14	13	12	14	12	12
Rayo Vallecano	10	14	16	16	16	17	17	17	15	16	16	12	12	12	11	12	12	13	13	11	11	12	13	12	13	13	12	12	13	14	13	12	13	13
Eibar	6	5	9	6	8	10	12	12	13	13	11	10	11	10	8	9	10	10	10	10	10	11	12	13	12	12	13	13	12	12	14	13	14	14
Deportivo	12	17	17	17	17	18	18	18	18	18	17	17	18	18	18	18	18	18	18	18	18	16	17	18	18	18	18	17	17	16	15	15	15	15
Espanyol	17	10	6	9	11	12	14	14	11	11	12	14	13	13	13	13	13	11	12	13	14	15	14	14	14	14	14	15	15	15	17	17	16	16
Santa Teresa	8	6	11	7	9	11	7	10	12	12	13	15	16	16	16	15	16	15	15	15	16	14	16	17	17	17	16	16	16	17	16	16	17	18
Logroño	13	18	15	15	15	15	15	15	16	15	18	16	14	14	15	16	14	14	14	16	17	18	15	16	16	16	17	18	18	18	18	18	18	17

Leader and UEFA Champions League group stage
UEFA Champions League second round
UEFA Champions League first round
Relegation to Segunda División

Updated to match(es) played on 24 June 2021. Source: RFEF

== Statistics ==
Goal scorers
Ranking	Player	Team	Goals
1	Jennifer Hermoso	Barcelona	31
2	Esther González	Levante	29
3	Asisat Oshoala	Barcelona	18
4	Alexia Putellas	Barcelona	18
5	Kosovare Asllani	Real Madrid	16

RFEF official website

Assistors
Ranking	Player	Team	Assists
1	Caroline Graham Hansen	Barcelona	18
2	Jennifer Hermoso	Barcelona	14
3	Aitana Bonmatí	Barcelona	11
4	Lieke Martens	Barcelona	11
5	Marta Torrejón	Barcelona	10

RFEF official website

Yellow cards
Ranking	Player	Team	Cards
1	Ana González	Betis	13
2	Natalia Ramos	Granadilla	11
3	Sara Tui	Madrid CFF	11
4	Geyse Ferreira	Madrid CFF	10
5	Nayadet López	Santa Teresa	10

RFEF official website

Red cards
Ranking	Player	Team	Cards
1	Inés Juan	Logroño	2
2	Grace Asantewaa	Logroño	1
3	Misa Rodríguez	Real Madrid	1
4	Paola Ulloa	Madrid CFF	1
5	Paula Andújar	Rayo Vallecano	1

RFEF official website
