= Susanne Kasperczyk =

German footballer (born 1985)

Personal information
- Full name: Susanne Stephanie Kasperczy
- Date of birth: 1 August 1985 (age 41)
- Place of birth: Eschweiler, West Germany
- Height: 1.62 m (5 ft 4 in)
- Positions: Left-back; midfielder

Senior career*
Years	Team	Apps	(Gls)
2002–2003	Teutonia Weiden		
2003–2007	Brauweiler Pulheim	58	(8)
2007–2009	Essen-Schönebeck	37	(4)
2009–2010	1. FC Köln		
2010–2013	Bayer Leverkusen	21	(3)
2013–2015	Alemannia Aachen		

International career
2002	Germany U19		
- * Club domestic league appearances and goals

Susanne Stephanie Kasperczyk (born 1 August 1985) is a German footballer who played as a left-back or midfielder. She made appearances in the Bundesliga for Bayer Leverkusen and also played for Brauweiler Pulheim, SG Essen-Schönebeck, 1. FC Köln, and Alemannia Aachen.

As an Under-19 international she played the 2002 U-19 World Championship and the 2002 and 2004 U-19 European Championships, winning the 2002 Euro.

The 2002 U-19 World Championship games were played in Canada, where she assisted on the game-winning goal scored by Linda Bresonik during extra time of the quarter-final with Japan in Edmonton, Alberta. She captained Germany in pre-tournament friendly in Lachine, Quebec in a loss to Canada.
