= Ane Campos =

Spanish footballer (born 1999)

Personal information
- Full name: Ane Campos Andueza
- Date of birth: 21 May 1999 (age 27)
- Place of birth: Getaria, Spain
- Position: Forward

Team information
- Current team: Athletic Club

Youth career
- 2011–2015: Zumaiako

Senior career*
Years	Team	Apps	(Gls)
2015–2016	Zumaiako		
2016–2018	Oiartzun		
2018–2019	Real Sociedad B		
2019–2025	Eibar	126	(10)
2025–	Athletic Club	0	(0)
- * Club domestic league appearances and goals as of 25 July 2025

Ane Campos Andueza (born 21 May 1999) is a Spanish footballer who plays as a forward for Athletic Club. She previously played for Eibar.

== Club career ==
Campos started her career at Zumaiako, where she played in the local Gipuzkoa provincial league. She then transferred to Oiartzun, appearing for their reserves in the regional third tier and their senior team in the second tier. In 2018 she signed for Primera División club Real Sociedad, but was assigned to their newly formed B-team in the Gipuzkoa league, helping them to win promotion with a near-perfect record.

Campos then moved on again in 2019, to Eibar (newly promoted to the new Segunda División Pro), and again was part of a successful campaign as the armaginak went up to the top tier for the first time in a decade.

She signed for Athletic Club in the summer of 2025.
