= University of the Basque Country =

Public university in the Basque Autonomous Community of Spain

- Euskal Herriko Unibertsitatea
- Motto: Eman ta zabal zazu (Give and extend knowledge)
- Type: Public
- Established: 1980
- Academic affiliations: Compostela Group of Universities
- Budget: €478 million (2009–10)
- Rector: Joxerramon Bengoetxea
- Faculty: 3,420 (2009–10)
- Students: 44,921 (2009–10)
- Undergraduates: 42,026 (2009–10)
- Postgraduates: 2,895 (2009–10)
- Location: Leioa, Biscay, Spain; 43.331°N 2.971°W
- Campus: Urban (3 campuses)
- Website: www.ehu.eus/eu/

The University of the Basque Country (officially in Basque: Euskal Herriko Unibertsitatea, EHU; Spanish: Universidad del País Vasco) is a Spanish public university of the Basque Autonomous Community.

Heir of the University of Bilbao, initially it was made up of the Faculty of Economic and Business Sciences of Sarriko (1955), Medicine (1968) and Sciences (1968). Following the General Law of Education (1970), the Nautical School (1784), the School of Business Studies of Bilbao (1818) and the Technical Schools of Engineers (1897) joined in, until it grew into the complex of thirty centers that compose it presently.

It has campuses over the three provinces of the autonomous community: Bizkaia Campus (in Leioa, Bilbao, Portugalete and Barakaldo), Gipuzkoa Campus (in San Sebastián and Eibar), and Alava Campus in Vitoria-Gasteiz. It stands out as the main research institution in the Basque Country, carrying out 90% of the basic research carried out in that territory and benefiting from the good industrial environment in the region.

The current rector is Joxerramon Bengoetxea, full professor of philosophy and law, since 2024.

== History ==
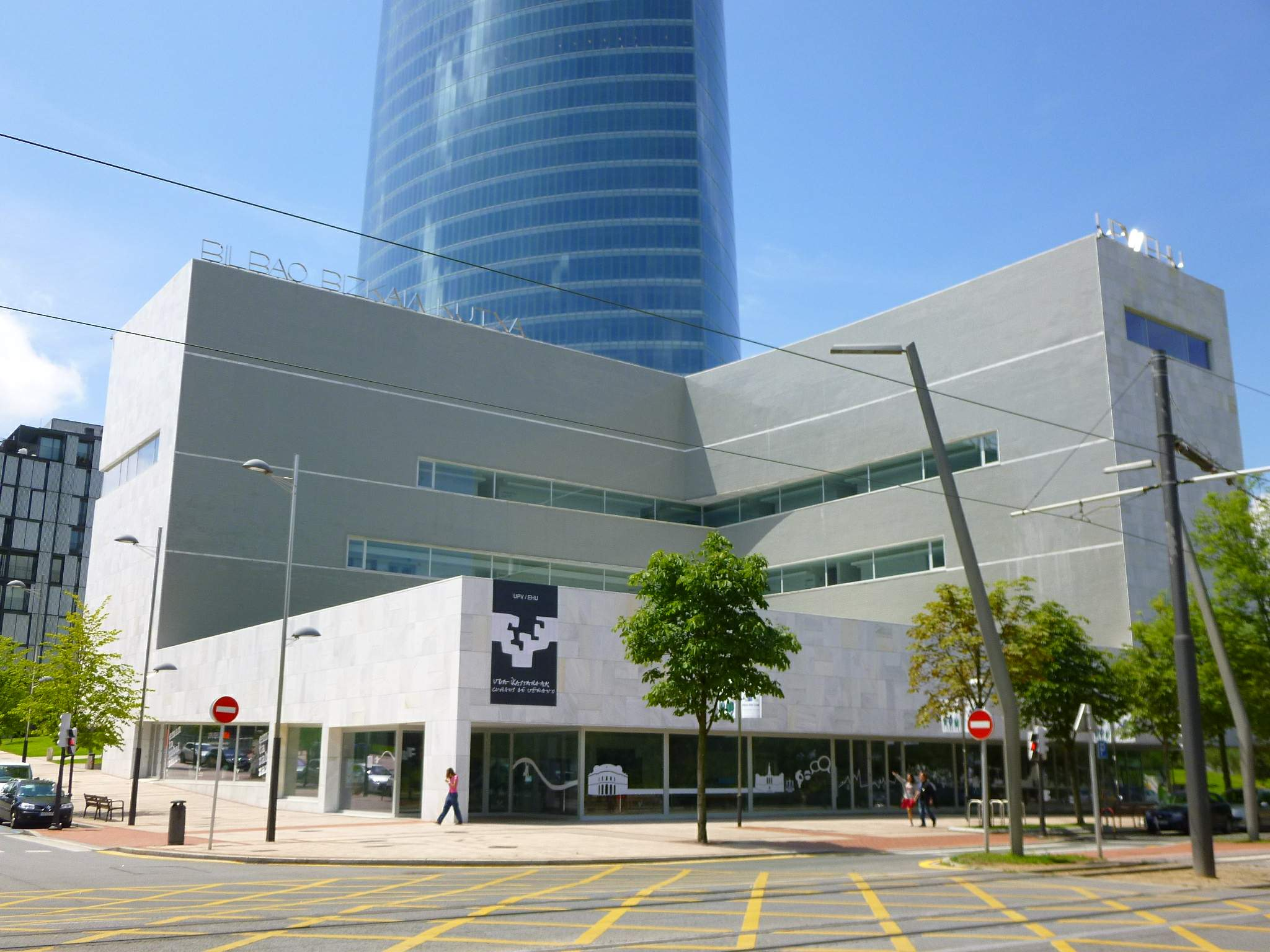
Bizkaia Aretoa, main hall of the University of the Basque Country in Bilbao

Although there have been numerous institutes of learning in the Basque Country over the centuries, starting with the Universidad Sancti Spiritus de Oñati, it was not until the 20th century that serious efforts were made to create an official university for the Basque people. The first of these opened its doors in Bilbao in 1938, largely thanks to the zeal of the Basque president (lehendakari) at the time, José Antonio Aguirre, an alumnus of the University of Deusto. However, this was during the Spanish Civil War, and an inopportune moment to open a centre of learning. The northwest of the Basque region mostly sided with the Republican movement at this time, earning the wrath of General Francisco Franco. Thus, when Franco's armies entered Bilbao on 19 June 1937, the fledgling university was shut down.

It was not until 1968 that another university in the Basque region was founded. In this year, the University of Bilbao was opened. In 1972, the Leioa premises were finished. They were in a remote place among cultivated fields. As in the case of the Somosaguas campus of the Complutense University of Madrid, the dictatorial authorities wanted to keep the rebellious students away from urban areas. In 1977, additional campuses sprang up in Álava and Gipuzkoa. Finally, in 1980, the university was officially designated to be the University of the Basque Country.

As of 2005, 78 different degrees are offered, and the university's 48,000 students can choose from more than 1,300 subjects of study. One can study 90% of the courses in the Basque language. The university is now recognised as one of the foremost in Spain, both in terms of the number of degrees offered and the quality of the typical degree awarded.

In 2009 the EHU project "Euskampus", was labeled as "Campus of International Excellence", highest quality award by the Spanish Minister of Education. The project has been designed with the aggregation of two important international players: Tecnalia Research and Innovation Corporation and Donostia International Physics Center Foundation.

The current rector is Joxerramon Bengoetxea. Former rectors:

- Gregorio Monreal
- Emilio Barberá
- Juan Jose Goiriena de Gandarias
- Pello Salaburu
- Manuel Montero
- Juan Ignacio Iglesias
- Iñaki Goirizelaia
- Nekane Balluerka
- Eva Ferreira

== Symbols ==
The motto of EHU is a Basque-language verse Eman ta zabal zazu ("Give and distribute [the fruit]"), from Gernikako Arbola, a Basque anthem from the 19th century.

The emblem of EHU is an interpretation of the Tree of Guernica by sculptor Eduardo Chillida.

== Campuses and structure ==
One of the characteristics of the university is the dispersion of its faculties and schools. The university contains three campuses, one for each of the three provinces of the Basque Autonomous Community.

=== Biscay Campus ===
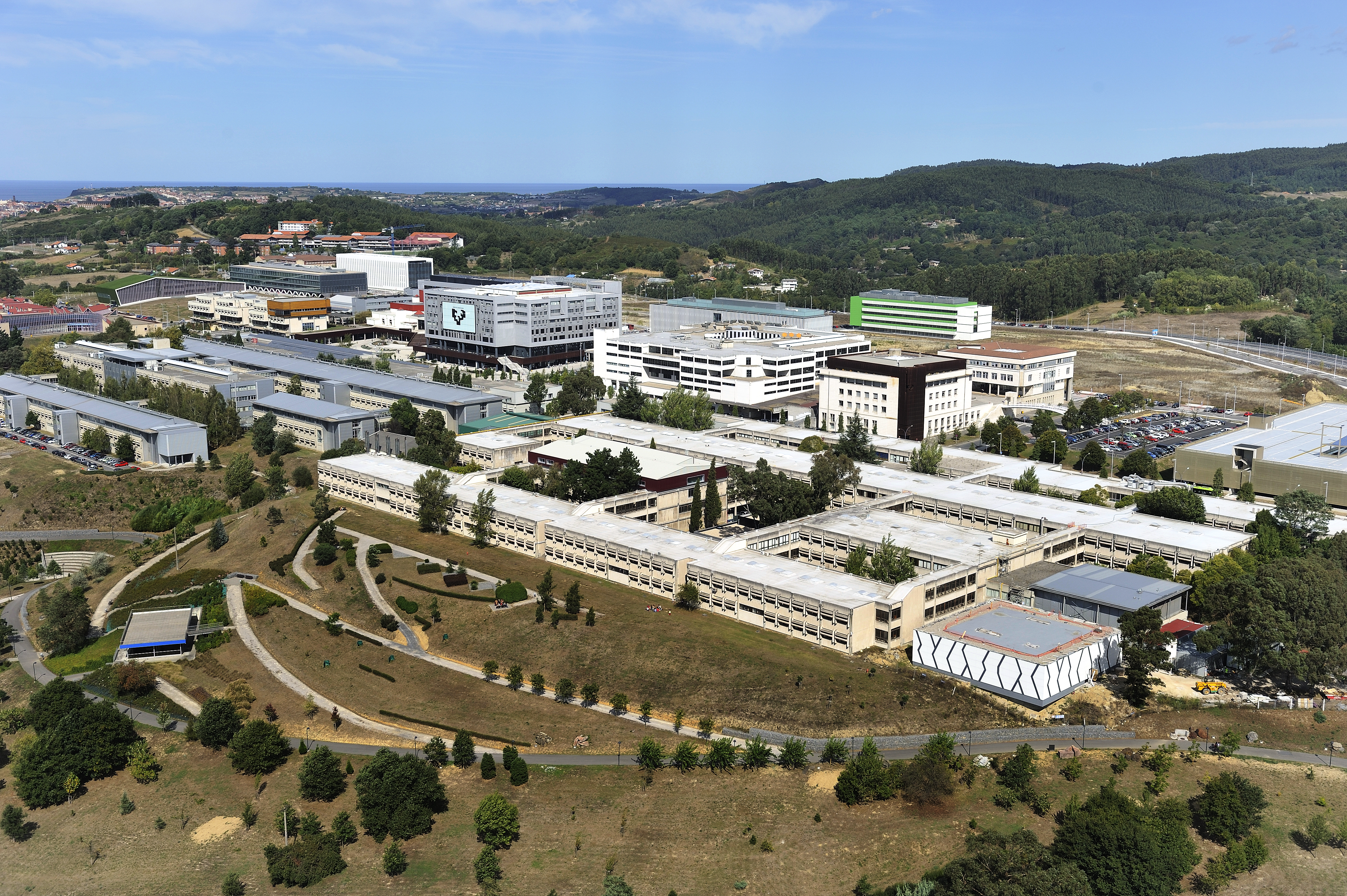
Overall view of the complex of Leioa

Biscay Campus is the largest and the busiest campus; its main complex is in Leioa, eleven kilometres away from Bilbao's city centre, in the seat of the former University of Bilbao. Nonetheless, there are other centres and schools within Bilbao, in Barakaldo and in Portugalete. Since 2011, the university also has a representation centre, the Bizkaia Aretoa, in the Abandoibarra neighbourhood of Bilbao, which houses some of the university's offices but also congresses and expositions.

==== Leioa ====
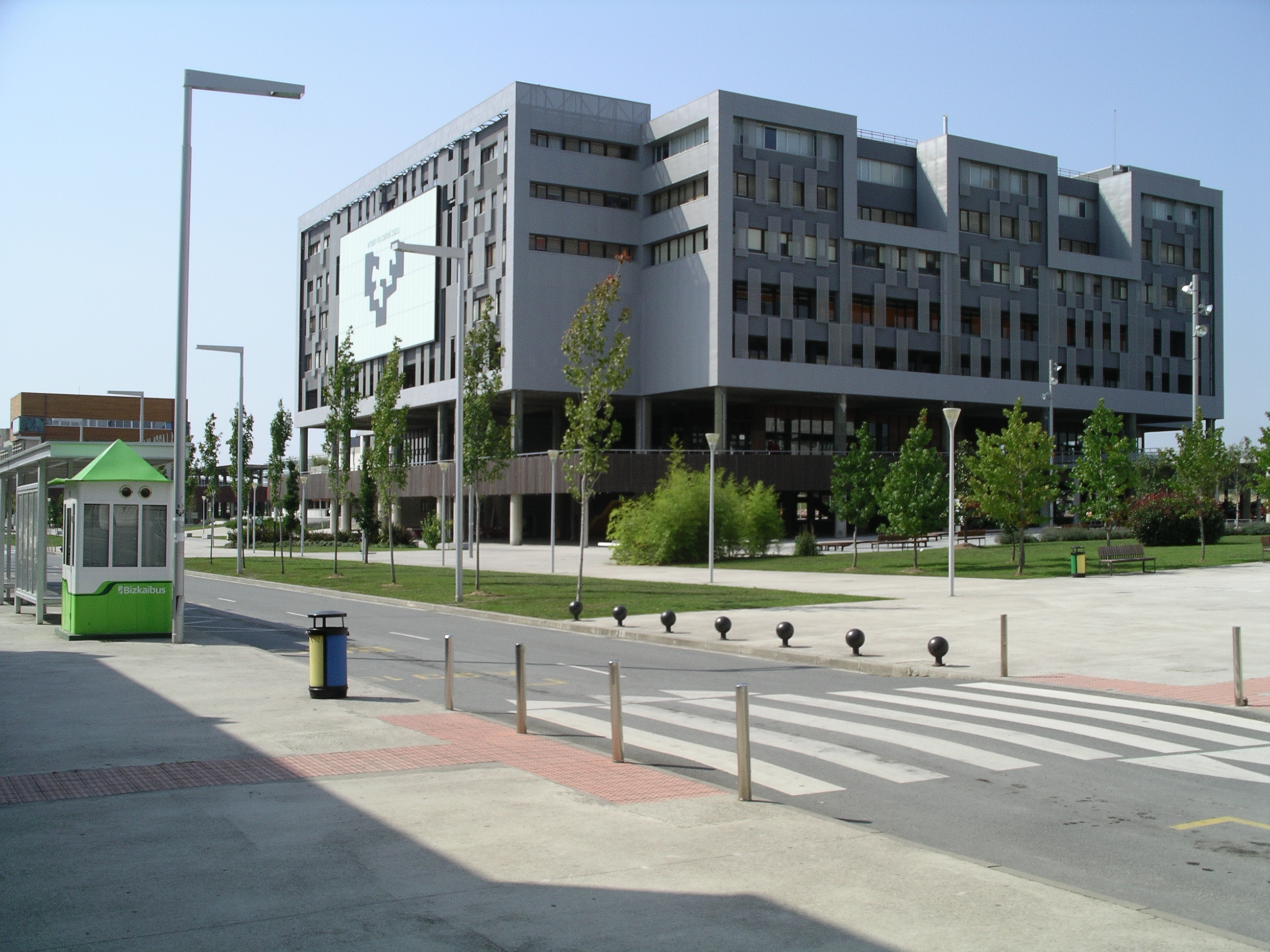
The central library building in the complex of Leioa

- Faculty of Fine Arts
- Faculty of Science and Technology
- Faculty of Social Sciences and Communication
- Faculty of Law – Biscay section
- Faculty of Education of Bilbao
- Faculty of Medicine and Nursing
- Faculty of Labour Relations and Social Work

==== Bilbao ====
- University College of Engineering of Bilbao
- Faculty of Economics and Business Studies
- Teaching Unit of Medicine (Basurto Hospital)
- Experience Classrooms of Biscay

==== Portugalete ====
- University College of Engineering of Bilbao

==== Barakaldo ====
- Teaching Unit of Medicine (Cruces Hospital)

==== Galdakao-Usansolo ====
- Teaching Unit of Medicine (Galdakao Hospital)

=== Gipuzkoa Campus ===
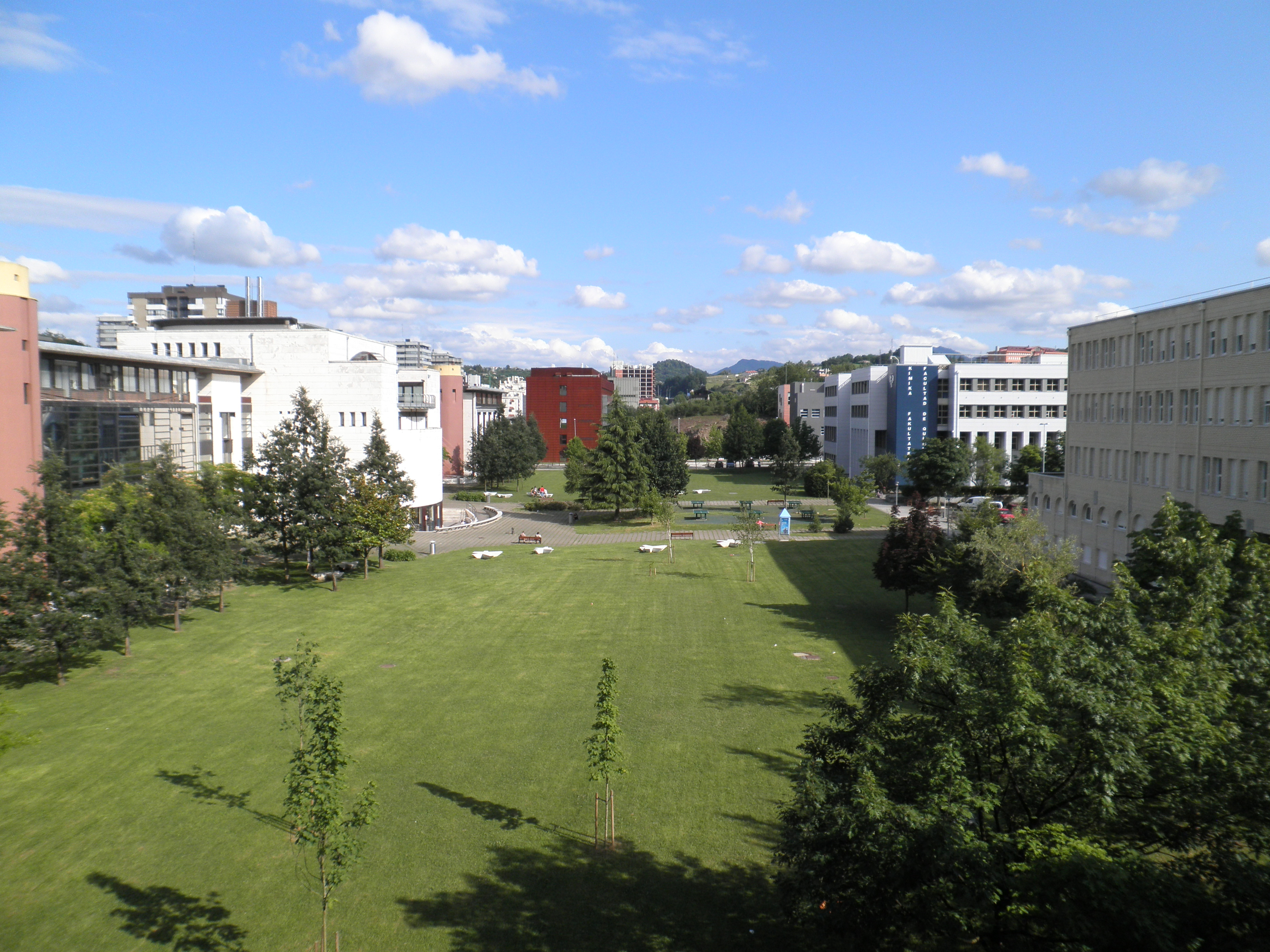
Gipuzkoa Campus in Ibaeta

Gipuzkoa Campus is seated in San Sebastián and Eibar. In San Sebastián, faculties and schools that used to be spread out in the city have been grouped together in the neighbourhood of Ibaeta.

==== San Sebastián ====
- Higher Technical School of Architecture
- Faculty of Law
- Faculty of Computer Engineering
- Faculty of Chemical Sciences
- Faculty of Psychology
- Faculty of Economics and Business Studies
- Faculty of Engineering of Gipuzkoa
- Faculty of Education, Philosophy and Anthropology
- Faculty of Medicine and Nursing
- Experience Classrooms of Gipuzkoa

==== Eibar ====
- Faculty of Engineering of Gipuzkoa

=== Álava Campus ===
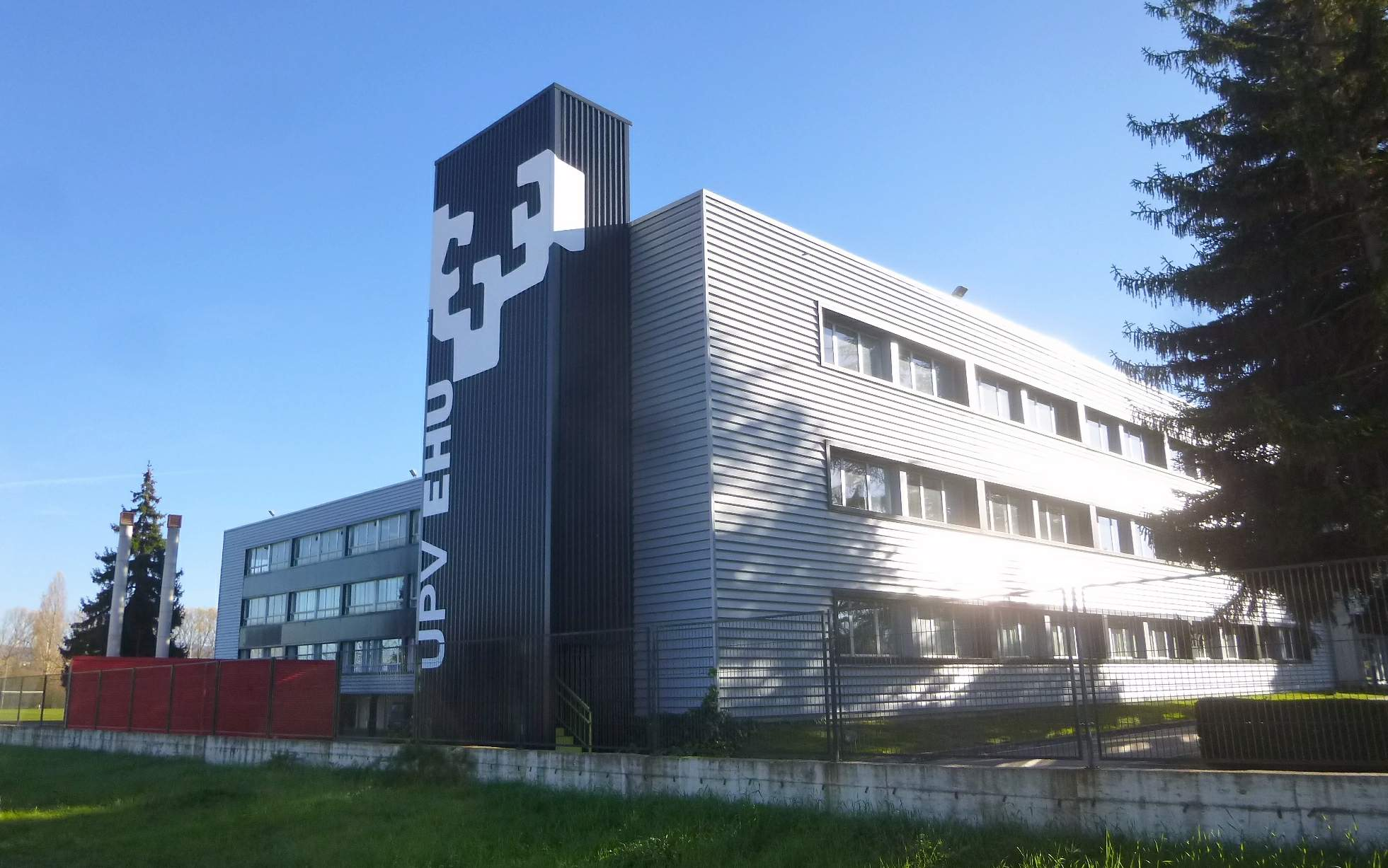
Sport section of the Faculty of Education and Sport, part of the Álava Campus

Álava Campus is seated in the south of Vitoria-Gasteiz:

- University College of Engineering of Vitoria-Gasteiz
- Faculty of Economics and Business Studies
- Faculty of Education and Sport
- Faculty of Pharmacy
- Faculty of Arts
- Faculty of Labour Relations and Social Work
- Teaching Unit of Medicine
- Experience Classrooms of Álava

=== Master and Doctoral School ===
The Master and Doctoral School is responsible for coordinating and managing doctoral programmes and interdisciplinary research training, as well as coordinating and managing official master's degrees, with exception of those with professional attributes. It is common to the three campuses.

=== Affiliated schools ===
There are five schools affiliated with EHU:

- Elias Querejeta Zine Eskola (Elias Querejeta Film School), San Sebastián.
- University School of Nursing of Vitoria-Gasteiz, in Txagorritxu Hospital, Vitoria-Gasteiz.
- University College of the Chamber of Commerce of Bilbao, in Bilbao.
- University School of Dual Engineering IMH, in Elgoibar.
- Goimailako Online Institutua (Higher Education Online Institute).

== List of rectors ==
- Joxerramon Bengoetxea (2024–present)
- Eva Ferreira (2021–2024)
- Nekane Balluerka (2017–2021)
- Iñaki Goirizelaia (2009–2017)

== Rankings and reputation ==
University rankings

Global – Overall
- ARWU World: 401–500 (2023)
- QS World: =624 (2026)
- THE World: 601–800 (2024)
- USNWR Global: =466 (2023)

== Summer courses ==
EHU conducts its Summer Courses, created in 1981, at the Miramar Palace in San Sebastián. They consist of a series of lectures, talks, courses, and master classes on diverse subjects from different areas of knowledge. World-renowned lecturers have been invited to the Summer Courses, as for example, Noam Chomsky in 2006.

== Sports ==
EHU has an important handball team. The university also had a football team that played in the Spanish Tercera División, Grupo 4 in the 2006–2007 season. They finished 19th and were relegated to the regional divisions.

The Engineering School of Bilbao and the University of Deusto hold yearly rowing competitions on the Estuary of Bilbao, inspired by the Oxford Cambridge boat race.

== English-language distance education ==
The university used to offer an English language, distance Postgraduate Diploma in International Election Observation and Electoral Assistance, the first official postgraduate qualification of its kind that provides advanced learning in electoral systems and electoral campaign processes, with a particular focus for those occurring in contexts of developing democracies or post-conflict situations. The programme was allegedly run in cooperation with many organisations in the field of election monitoring, such as The Carter Center, Electoral Reform International Services (ERIS), International Foundation for Electoral Systems (IFES), National Democratic Institute (NDI), the Organization of American States (OAS), the OSCE and the Office for Democratic Institutions and Human Rights (ODIHR) but such partnerships were not officially confirmed.

== Other universities operating in the Basque Country ==
- University of Pau and the Adour region
- University of Deusto
- National University of Distance Education
- University of Navarre
- Universidad Pública de Navarra
- Mondragon University
- Musikene

== See also ==
- ESDP-Network
- Basque Museum of the History of Medicine and Science
- Arantza Díaz de Ilarraza Sánchez
