= CD Calahorra B =

Association football club in Spain

Calahorra B
- Full name: Club Deportivo Calahorra "B"
- Nickname: Crianza Rojilla
- Founded: 1965
- Ground: La Planilla, Calahorra, La Rioja, Spain
- Capacity: 5,000
- President: Tomás Lorente
- Head coach: Keku Urzanqui
- 2025–26: Regional Preferente, 5th of 18
Home colours	Away colours

Club Deportivo Calahorra "B" is a Spanish football club based in Calahorra, in the autonomous community of La Rioja. Founded in the 1970s, it is the reserve team of CD Calahorra, and currently plays in , holding home matches at Estadio La Planilla, with a capacity of 5,000 spectators.

== History ==
Founded in 1965 as CD Calahorra Promesas, the club acted as a reserve team of CD Calahorra and played intermittently in the regional leagues until the club decided to close the reserve section in 1995. They returned to an active status in 1998, playing four seasons in the Regional Preferente before again folding.

In 2004, Calahorra reached an agreement with AF Calahorra to become their farm team, and in June 2011, the latter was fully integrated in the former's structure, being renamed to CD Calahorra B. In the following year, however, the club opted to use the Juvenil squad as their reserve team, and the B-team became inactive.

Calahorra B returned to action in 2018, and immediately achieved promotion to Tercera División in May of the following year.

== Season to season ==
Season	Tier	Division	Place	Copa del Rey
1965–66	5	2ª Reg.	3rd	
1966–67	5	2ª Reg.	(R)	
1967–68	DNP			
1968–69	5	2ª Reg.	1st	
1969–70	5	2ª Reg.	6th	
1970–71	5	2ª Reg.	3rd	
1971–72	5	2ª Reg.	5th	
1972–73	5	2ª Reg.	8th	
1973–74	5	2ª Reg.	9th	
1974–75	5	1ª Reg.	7th	
1975–76	5	1ª Reg.	4th	
1976–77	5	1ª Reg.	14th	
1977–78	7	2ª Reg.	13th	
1978–1982	DNP			
1982–83	7	2ª Reg.	8th	
1983–84	7	2ª Reg.	1st	
1984–85	6	1ª Reg.	10th	
1985–86	6	1ª Reg.	6th	
1986–87	5	Reg. Pref.	16th	
1987–88	5	Reg. Pref.	9th	

Season	Tier	Division	Place
1988–89	6	1ª Reg.	2nd
1989–90	5	Reg. Pref.	8th
1990–91	5	Reg. Pref.	12th
1991–92	5	Reg. Pref.	3rd
1992–93	5	Reg. Pref.	3rd
1993–94	5	Reg. Pref.	8th
1994–95	5	Reg. Pref.	5th
1995–96	DNP		
1996–97	DNP		
1997–98	DNP		
1998–99	5	Reg. Pref.	7th
1999–2000	5	Reg. Pref.	10th
2000–01	5	Reg. Pref.	7th
2001–02	5	Reg. Pref.	7th
2002–2011	DNP		
2011–12	5	Reg. Pref.	17th (Note: Merge with AF Calahorra)
2012–2018	DNP		
2018–19	5	Reg. Pref.	1st
2019–20	4	3ª	9th
2020–21	4	3ª	4th / 1st

Season	Tier	Division	Place
2021–22	5	3ª RFEF	8th
2022–23	5	3ª Fed.	10th
2023–24	5	3ª Fed.	3rd
2024–25	5	3ª Fed.	7th
2025–26	6	Reg. Pref.	5th
2026–27	6	Reg. Pref.	

- 2 seasons in Tercera División
- 4 seasons in Tercera Federación/Tercera División RFEF
