= Katharina Grießemer =

German footballer (born 1986)

Personal information
- Date of birth: 13 July 1986 (age 40)
- Place of birth: Roth, West Germany
- Height: 1.69 m (5 ft 7 in)
- Position: Defender

Senior career*
Years	Team	Apps	(Gls)
2003–2005	Bayern Munich	40	(4)
2005–2006	Hamburger SV	6	(0)
2007–2008	Crailsheim		
2008–2009	Nürnberg		
2009–2010	Weinberg		

International career
2001–2003	Germany U17	23	(4)
2003–2005	Germany U19	20	(7)
- * Club domestic league appearances and goals

Katharina Grießemer (born 13 July 1986) is a German former footballer who played as a defender, notably in the Frauen-Bundesliga for Bayern Munich, Hamburger SV and TSV Crailsheim. She represented the Germany U17 and Germany U19 national teams at international level.

== Career ==
From 2003 to 2008 Grießemer played in the Frauen-Bundesliga for Bayern Munich, Hamburger SV and TSV Crailsheim. Afterwards, she played for lower-tier teams including 1. FC Nürnberg (Bayernliga) and SV 67 Weinberg (Regionalliga Süd).

A daughter of a former footballer and manager, Grießemer began playing club football with local side FC Memmingen. At age 16, she joined Bayern Munich becoming the club's youngest senior player. After two seasons playing for Bayern Munich, Grießemer moved to Hamburger SV. However, early in her first season, she suffered a knee injury, which would require four operations to address. In September 2006, she terminated her contract with Hamburger SV, and joined Crailsheim in the 2006–07 season winter break. However, she re-injured her knee in a friendly match before the season restarted.

As an Under-19 international Grießemer took part in the 2004 U-19 European Championship.
