= Eva Ferreira =

Basque mathematician and economist

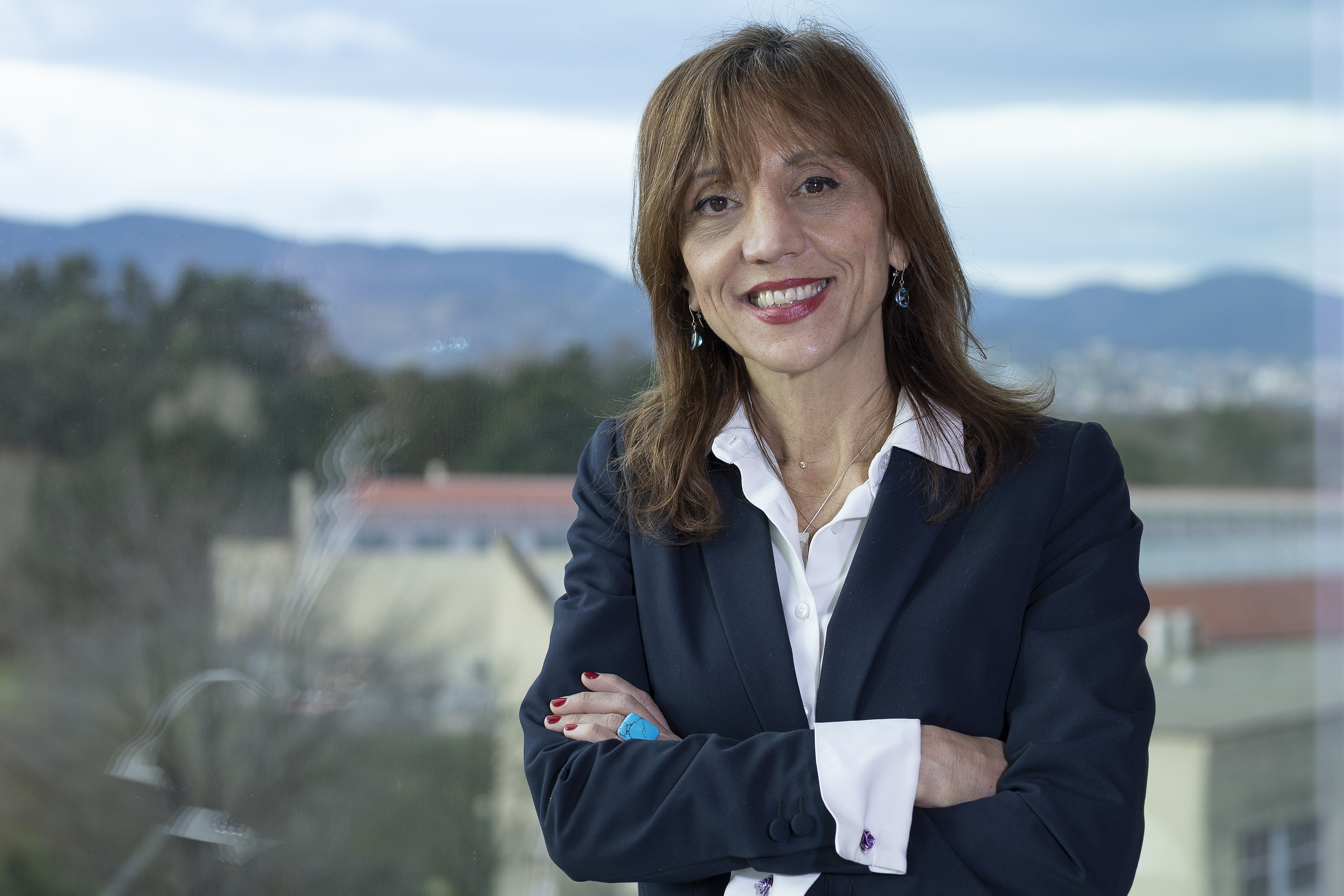
- Eva Ferreira in 2021
- Born: María Eva Ferreira García; 25 January 1963 (age 63); Barakaldo, Basque Country
- Education: University of the Basque Country
- Known for: Rector of the University of the Basque Country (2021-2025)
- Scientific career
- Fields: Mathematics, Economics
- Thesis: (1994)
- Website: www.ehu.eus/en/en-governance-team/rector

María Eva Ferreira García (born 25 January 1963 in Barakaldo, Biscay) is a Basque mathematician, economist and university professor.

She is currently the Rector of the University of the Basque Country (UPV/EHU) since 2021, being the second woman to hold the position of rector after Nekane Balluerka.

She graduated from the University of the Basque Country with a degree in Mathematics. She obtained a master's degree in Probability and Statistics from the Courant Institute of Mathematical Sciences (New York University) and a PhD in Economics from the University of the Basque Country. Since 2005, she has held a full professorship in Applied Economics.

On 25 January 2021, she was named Rector of the University of the Basque Country (UPV/EHU).

== Academic researcher ==
In 1994, she received her PhD in Economics from the University of the Basque Country under the supervision of Dr. Fernando Tusell. The title of her doctoral thesis was "Non-parametric smoothing; with application to spectral estimation." The thesis formulated an estimation of the spectral density function, a fundamental function in the analysis of time series, from a non-parametric point of view. Her work studied and generalized non-parametric methods, in particular spline estimators, for general regression models, and on the other hand, solved the problem of their application to spectral analysis, obtaining improved results. She also carried out research on computation and simulation, and with these tools, she demonstrated the theoretical results obtained during her thesis work. Her work has had applications in fields such as the analysis of the effects of drugs in medicine or the assessment of systemic risk in finance.

Subsequently, she was head of the PhD Programme in Quantitative Finance (UPV/EHU, 2000-2004 and 2013–2015).

In 2021, her research topics at the theoretical level were stochastic processes and non-parametric estimation; while at the application level, Ferreira's research topics have focused on finance, the gender gap and the glass ceiling effect. In several talks, she has explained how mathematics is a useful tool in the analysis of inequalities between ethnic groups, between sexes, and between countries and specifically how mathematics can be used to understand the 'glass-ceiling' effect.

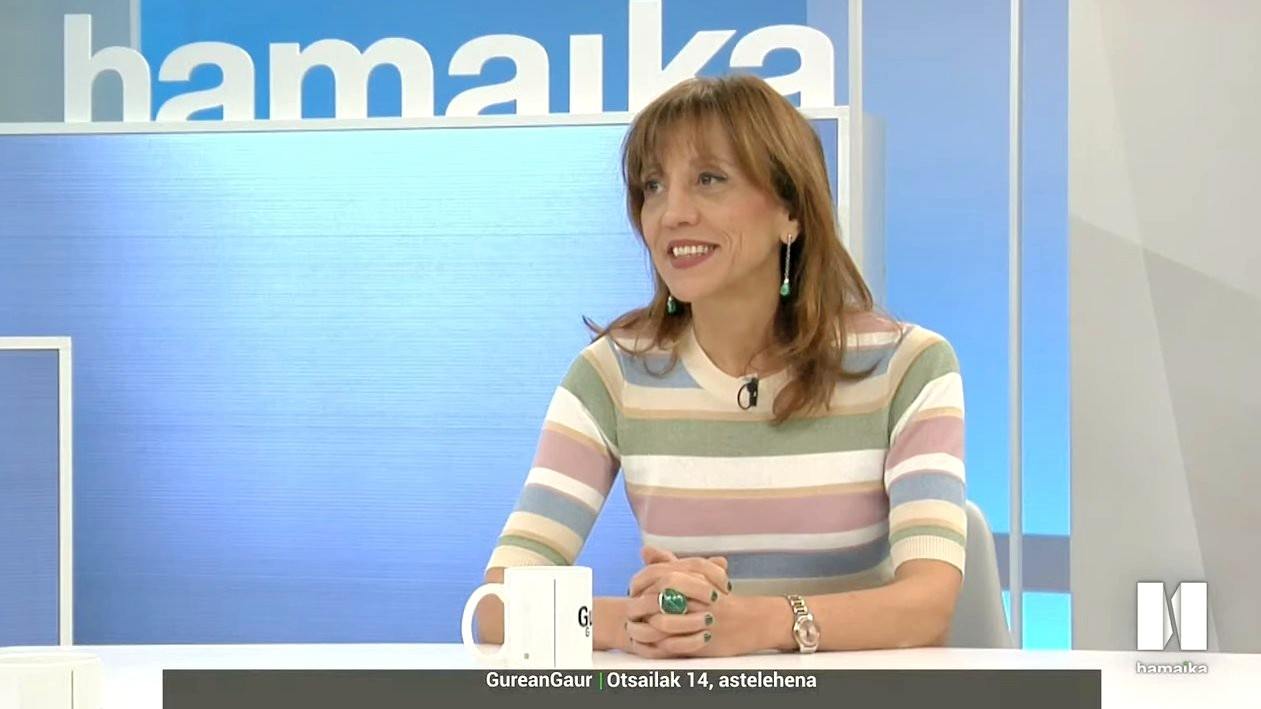
Eva Ferreira, Rector of the UPV/EHU: "We must encourage women to study science and get involved in research." (Hamaika Television, 2022-02-14)

Since March 2020, she has been a member of the expert committee of CEMAT (Spanish Mathematics Committee), where she has collaborated in coronavirus data modelling and monitoring.

She has spent time as a guest researcher at various universities, including the University of Bath, University of Giessen, (Universidad Complutense de Madrid), University of Freiburg and University of Louisiana System, and has lectured at University of São Paulo, Louisiana and Ahmedabad University in India. She has also supervised five doctoral theses.

== University management ==
Eva has a long track record in university management, holding various positions, including the Vice-Rector for Economic Affairs and Academic Programs (2004-2008), General Secretary (2009-2012), and the Chief Director of Unibasq, the agency for the quality of the Basque University System. On 25 January 2021, she was named Rector of the University of the Basque Country (UPV/EHU), replacing Nekane Balluerka.
