= AF Calahorra =

Spanish football club

- Full name: Asociación de Fútbol Calahorra
- Founded: 2004 (men's); 2012 (women's)
- Dissolved: 2012 (men's); 2014 (women's)
- Ground: Campo de Fútbol La Planilla, Calahorra, La Rioja, Spain
- Capacity: 4,000
- Chairman: (Spain) Jesús María Mangado
Home colours	Away colours

Asociación de Fútbol Calahorra was a Spanish women's football team based in Calahorra in the autonomous community of La Rioja. Founded in 2004, they held home matches at the Campo de Fútbol La Planilla, with a capacity of 4,000 seaters.

In the 2011–12 season, the club was the reserve team of CD Calahorra, changing their name to CD Calahorra B. The men's section was disbanded in June 2012, when that was acquired by Calahorra, and kept the women's section active for two more years.

== Season to season (men's) ==
Season	Tier	Division	Place	Copa del Rey
2004–05	5	Reg. Pref.	11th	
2005–06	5	Reg. Pref.	11th	
2006–07	5	Reg. Pref.	11th	
2007–08	5	Reg. Pref.	4th	
2008–09	4	3ª	12th	
2009–10	4	3ª	15th	
2010–11	4	3ª	20th	
2011–12	5	Reg. Pref.	17th (Note: Merge with CD Calahorra B)	N/A (Note: Reserve team of Calahorra.)

- 3 season in Tercera División
