= Svetlana Tsydikova =

Russian footballer

Svetlana Tsidikova
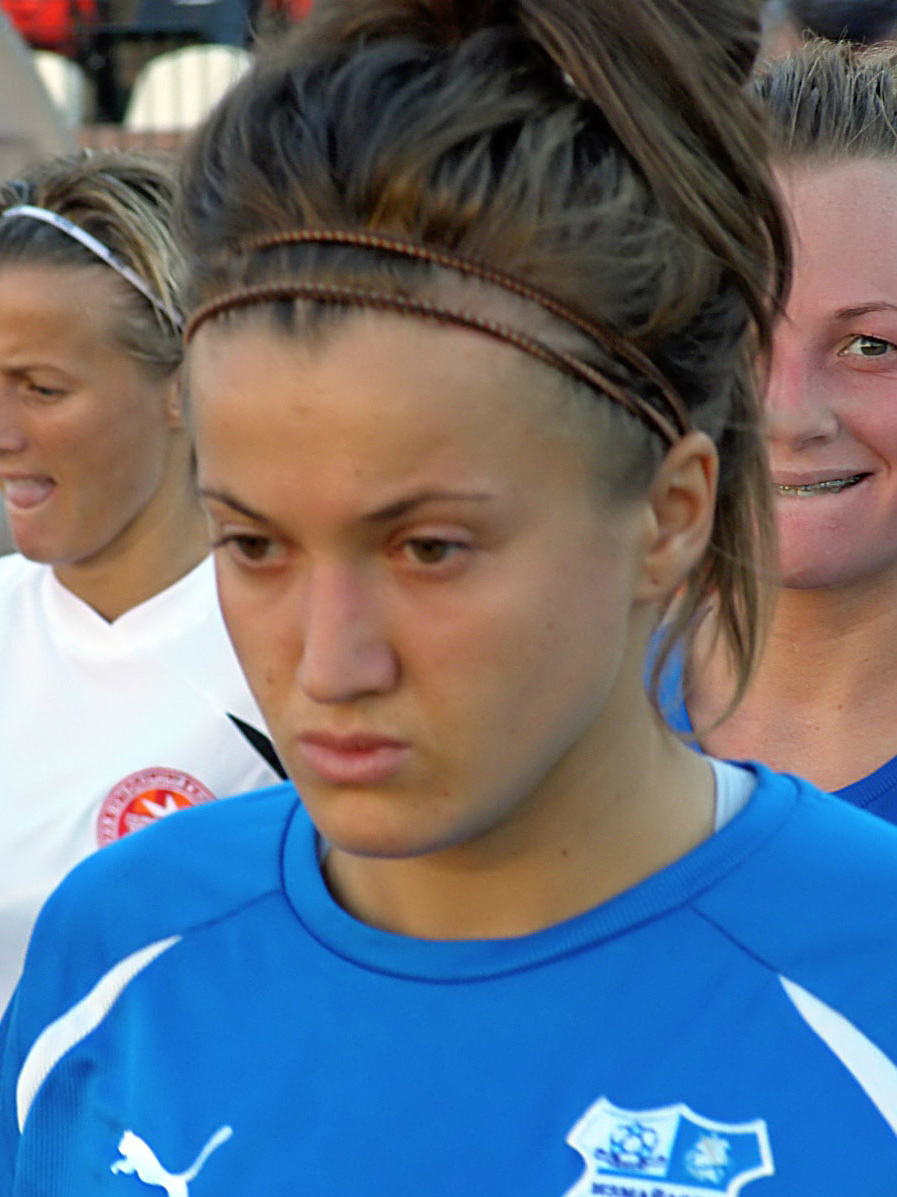

Personal information
- Full name: Svetlana Tsidikova
- Date of birth: 4 February 1985 (age 41)
- Place of birth: Soviet Union
- Height: 1.62 m (5 ft 4 in)
- Position: Midfielder

Senior career*
Years	Team	Apps	(Gls)
2001–2003	Nadezhda Noginsk		
2004–2006	WFC Rossiyanka		
2007	Khimki		
2008	Nadezhda Noginsk		
2009	Energiya Voronezh	11	(4)
2010–	Izmailovo	20	(3)

International career
- Russia
- * Club domestic league appearances and goals

Svetlana Tsidikova (born 4 February 1985) is a Russian former football midfielder. She previously played for Nadezhda Noginsk, WFC Rossiyanka, FC Khimki and Energiya Voronezh, also playing the European Cup with Rossiyanka.

She has been a member of the Russian national team, taking part in the 2009 European Championship. As an under-19 international she played the 2004 U-19 World Championship.
