= Nekane Balluerka =

President of the University of the Basque Country (2017–2021)

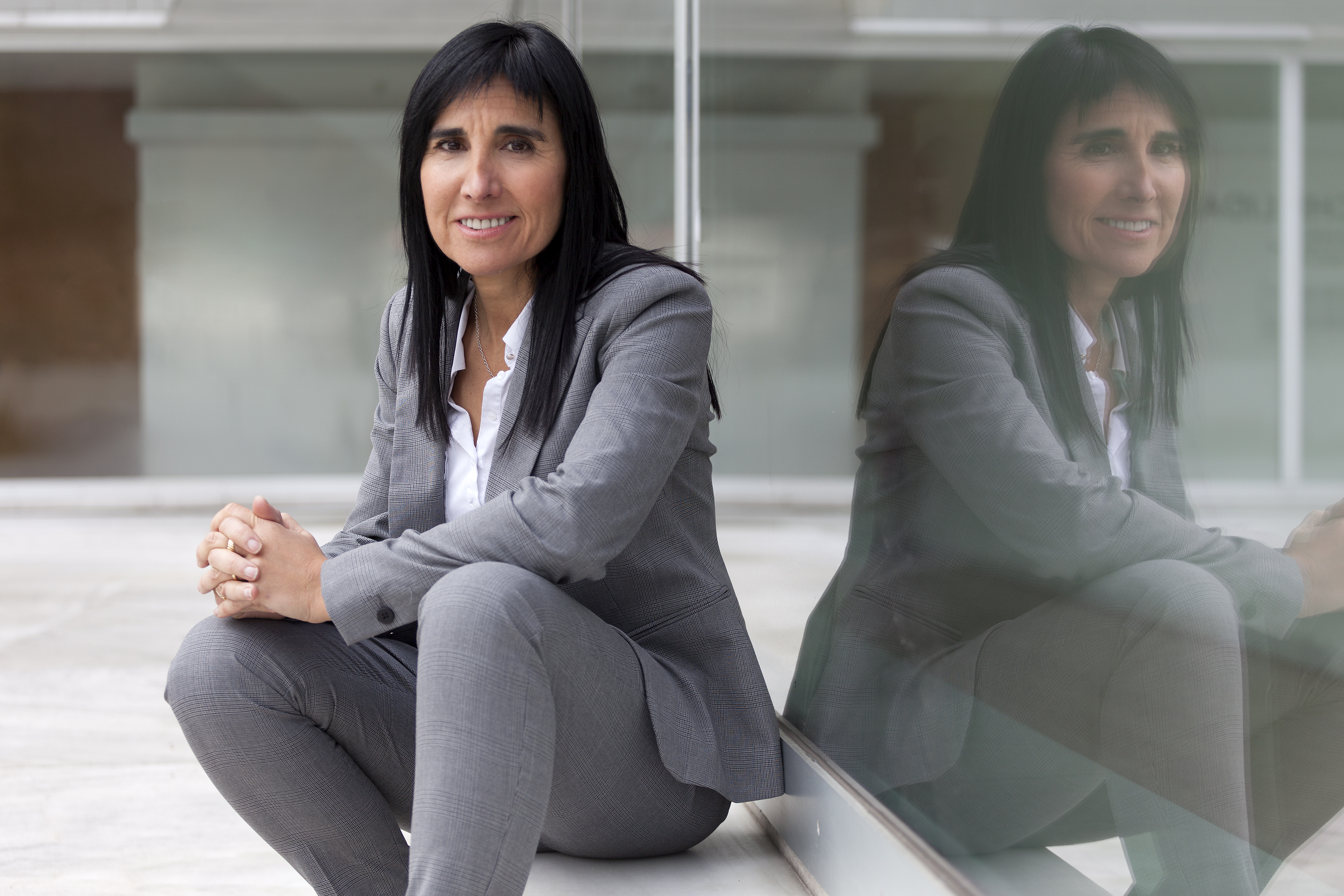
- Nekane Balluerka in 2017
- Born: Miren Nekane Balluerka Lasa; December 5, 1966 (age 59); Ordizia, Basque Country
- Education: University of the Basque Country
- Known for: Rector of the University of the Basque Country (2017-2021)
- Scientific career
- Fields: Psychology, Behavioural Science
- Thesis: (1993)

Miren Nekane Balluerka Lasa (born 5 December 1966 in Ordizia, Gipuzkoa) is a Basque psychologist and university professor.

She held the position of Rector of the University of the Basque Country, between 2017 and 2021, being the first woman to hold the position of rector.

In 2021 she was awarded the Euskadi Research Award by the Basque Government.

She teaches Behavioural Science Methodology at the Faculty of Psychology, University of the Basque Country (UPV/EHU).

== Academic researcher ==
She obtained her bachelor's degree in psychology from the University of the Basque Country (UPV/EHU) in 1989 and a PhD from the same university in 1993, winning the Special End of Degree Prize in both cases. On completing her bachelor's degree, she began to work as a lecturer at the Faculty of Psychology.

Since 2009, she has held the post of Full Professor of Behavioural Science Methodology. Her research work focuses on methods for drawing up psychological assessment instruments, on the intercultural adaptation of such instruments and on the application of multi-level analysis models to the study of psychosocial phenomena. She has taken part in 42 subsidised research projects, on 9 of which she has been the lead researcher. She is also the lead researcher of the Qualiker research group, which has been assessed as excellent in the Basque university system. She has co-authored more than a hundred scientific papers, 26 books and 9 book chapters. She has contributed to more than 200 domestic and international congresses.

She has directed or co-directed 10 doctoral theses, two of these theses won the first prize and runner-up prize in the Basque Government's Realidad Social Vasca [“Basque Social Reality”] award.

She has spent time as a guest researcher at Arizona State University (1995), the University of California (2005), and the Cathie Marsh Centre for Census and Survey Research at the University of Manchester (2010).

She was a founder member of AEMCCO (Spanish Association for Behavioural Science Methodology) and of the EAM (European Association of Methodology). From 2011 to 2015 she was the editor of the official journal of this last association: Methodology. European Journal of Research Methods for the Behavioral and Social Sciences. She is a member of The Board of the Donostia International Physics Center (DIPC) Foundation.

== University management ==
Nekane has a long track record in university management. She has been Deputy Dean of the Faculty of Psychology (2004–2006), Vice-Rector for Teaching Quality and Innovation (2006–2009), Vice-Rector for Postgraduate Studies and International Relations (2012–2016), and since January 2017 she has been the rector of the University of the Basque Country. She replaced Iñaki Goirizelaia that had been the rector since 2009. She was the first elected women to be the President of the University of the Basque Country (rector).

== Textbooks in Basque language ==
Balluerka was one of the first authors in the areas of Behavioural Science and Psychology to publish textbooks and teaching materials in Basque. She is a member of the UEU (Basque Summer University). Her original and co-authored publications include:

- SPSS eta R Commander. Ikerketa ez-esperimentaleko datuen analisia (2018)
- Sentituz, izan sortzaile. Gazteen sormen emozionala sustatzeko esku-hartze programa (2017)
- Psikopatologia (2014)
- Facilitación de equipos de innovación (2013)
- Nortasunaren nahasteen etiologia eta tratamendua (2011)
- Kontzientzia fonologikoa lantzeko programa (2008)
- Hizkuntza idatziaren didaktika Haur Hezkuntzan eta Lehen Hezkuntzan (2008)
- Ikerketa metodoak eta diseinuak psikologian (2007)
- Ikerkuntza psikologian. Ikerketa-baldintzak eta diseinuaren baliotasuna (2003)
- Diseños de investigación experimental en Psicología. Modelos y análisis de datos mediante el SPSS 10.0 (2002)
- Psikologia zientzia gisa: Paradigma eta metodologiako aldaketa nagusiak (2001)
- Planificaciónde la investigación. La validez del diseño (1999)
- La Psicología como ciencia: Principales cambios paradigmáticos y metodológicos (1998)
- Saiakuntza eta sasi-saiakuntza diseinuaren balidezia psikologian (1996)
- Datu analisia eta saiakuntza diseinuak portaera zientziatan (1995)
- Cómo mejorar el estudio y aprendizaje de textos de carácter científico (1995)

== Sports ==
In her younger years, she played football and practised the martial art of Shorinji-Kempo.
