= Arrate Orueta =

Spanish footballer (born 1984)

Personal information
- Full name: Arrate Orueta Olabarria
- Date of birth: 8 August 1984 (age 42)
- Place of birth: Bilbao, Spain
- Height: 1.74 m (5 ft 9 in)
- Position: Midfielder

Senior career*
| Years | Team | Apps | (Gls) |
| 2000–2002 | SD Leioa | | |
| 2002–2003 | Athletic Bilbao B | | |
| 2003–2015 | Athletic Bilbao | 234 | (48) |

International career
| 2007–2014 | Basque Country | 4 | (1) |
- * Club domestic league appearances and goals

Arrate Orueta (born 8 August 1984) is a Spanish retired footballer who played as a midfielder for Athletic Bilbao. Since retiring, she works as a doctor in Barakaldo.

== Titles ==
- Primera División (women): 2003, 2004, 2005, 2007
