= Anneli Giske =

Norwegian footballer (born 1985)

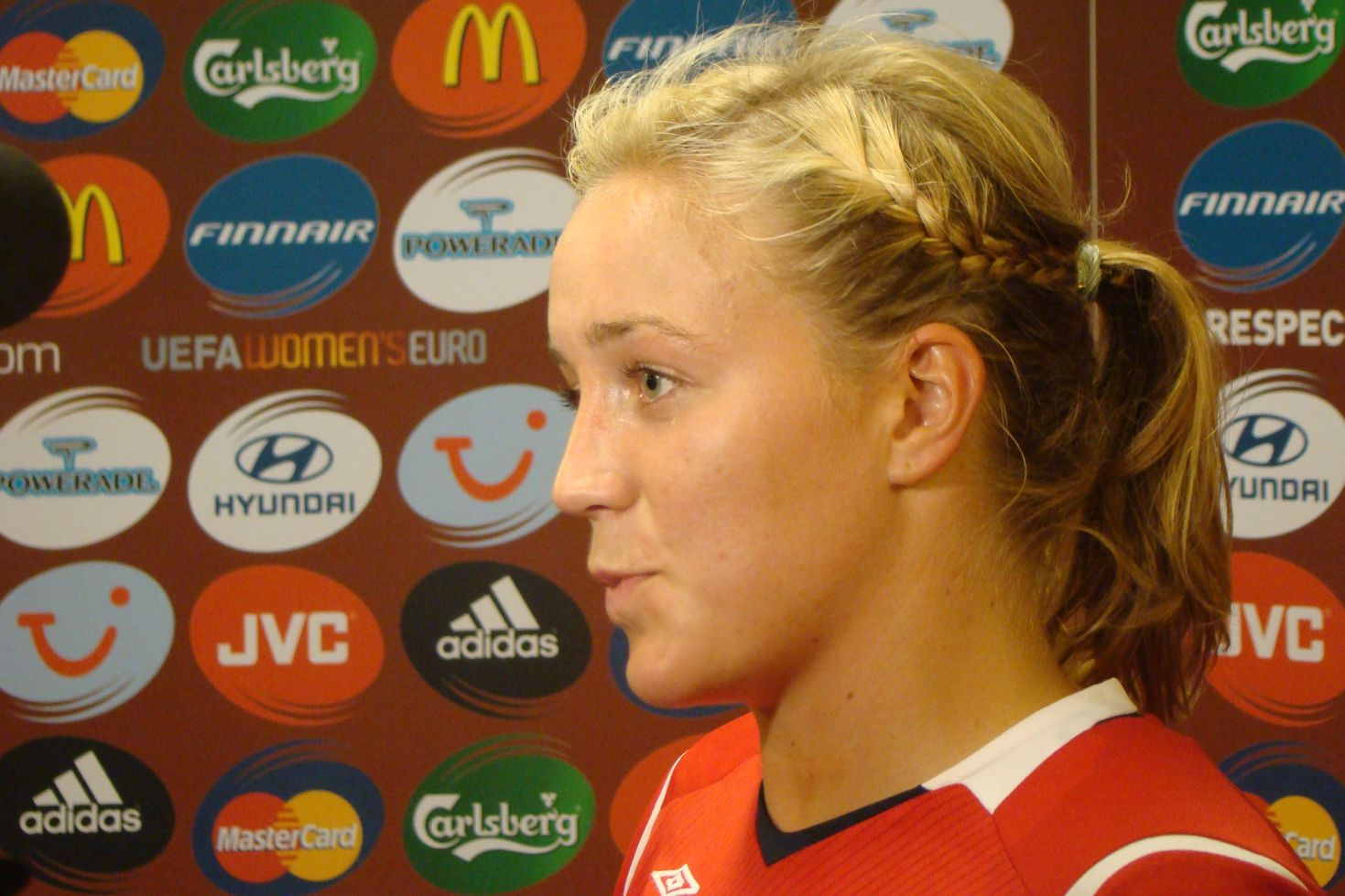

Personal information
- Full name: Anneli Giske
- Date of birth: 25 July 1985 (age 41)
- Place of birth: Salangen, Norway
- Height: 1.74 m (5 ft 9 in)
- Position: Midfielder

Team information
- Current team: IF Fløya
- Number: 5

Youth career
- Salangen IF

Senior career*
Years	Team	Apps	(Gls)
–2004	Medkila IL		
2005–	IF Fløya		

International career^{‡}
2008–	Norway	17	(2)
- * Club domestic league appearances and goals as of 10:15, 11 September 2011 (UTC) ‡ National team caps and goals as of 10:15, 11 September 2011 (UTC)

Anneli Giske (born 25 July 1985) is a Norwegian international footballer who plays club football for IF Fløya of the Norwegian 1. divisjon.

== Club career ==
Giske won the 2003 Norwegian Women's Cup with Medkila IL, who were also promoted to the Topppserien. When Medkila suffered relegation after one season, Giske transferred to IF Fløya. She played for the club while studying for a degree in medicine at the University of Tromsø.

After an ankle injury early in 2010 followed by a broken toe and an anterior cruciate ligament injury Giske underwent knee surgery in October 2010 and hoped to return to playing for Fløya (now in division-1) in 2012. Meanwhile, (April 2012) she is Fløya's assistant trainer while working her 18-month period of compulsory training as a junior doctor which began in February 2012.

After the 2013 season, Giske claimed she was quitting Fløya after suffering further injuries and failing to recapture her earlier form. But when the new season came round Giske was still in the team.

== International career ==
In October 2008 Giske made her senior international debut for Norway against Russia. She was selected for UEFA Women's Euro 2009, and scored the second goal in Norway's 3–1 quarter final win over Sweden. Giske had been named an alternate for the 2008 Olympics.
