= Athletic Bilbao (women) =

Spanish football club

Athletic Femenino
- Full name: Athletic Club Femenino
- Nicknames: Las Leonas (The Lionesses); Neskak (Girls); Rojiblancas (Red-Whites)
- Founded: 2002; 24 years ago
- Stadium: Lezama (Field 2)
- Capacity: 3,250
- President: Jon Uriarte
- Head coach: Javi Lerga
- League: Liga F
- 2025–26: 7th
- Website: athletic-club.eus/women
Home colours	Away colours

Athletic Club Femenino is the women's football section of the professional football club Athletic Bilbao, competing in Liga F. Athletic is one of the most successful women's teams in Spain, with five championships. Just as with the men's team, their official policy is to sign players native to or trained in football in the greater Basque Country. The team plays at the club's facilities in Lezama on the outskirts of Bilbao.

== History ==
The team was founded in 2000 as Leioa EFT after CD Sondika disbanded its women's team, which had played in the defunct División de Honor in the 1990s. After Leioa gained promotion to the new Superliga Femenina in just two years, it was absorbed by Athletic Bilbao, with the process coordinated by Ernesto Valverde and Andoni Zubizarreta. At that time a reserve team, Athletic B, was also introduced – they currently compete in the second tier, the Primera Federación.

In their debut season Athletic won the championship, and successfully defended the title in the next two seasons, becoming the first team to be awarded the trophy to keep permanently. After a disappointing 2006 season, Athletic won its fourth title in 2007. As a result of their title wins they made four appearances in the UEFA Women's Cup, being knocked out in the group stages by 1. FFC Frankfurt in 2004, Djurgårdens IF in 2005, SV Saestum in 2006 and ASDCF Bardolino in 2008.

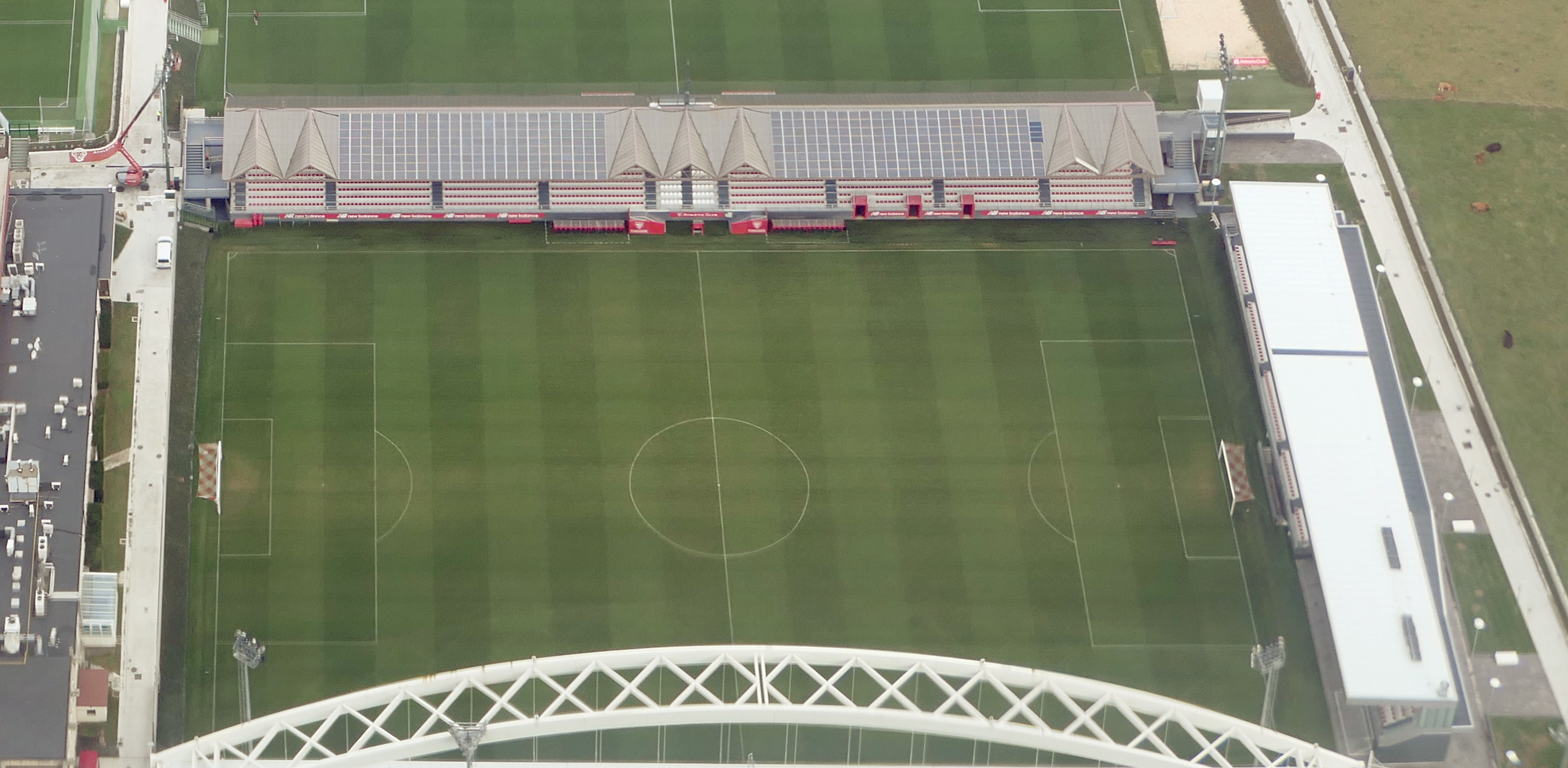
Aerial view of the team's mini-stadium at Lezama, 2019

In June 2008, the club agreed a decision (which was ratified in 2009) for the women's team to become an official women's section rather than be handled like a youth team. Athletic finished third in the next four championships between 2008 and 2011. In 2012 they were runners-up, and reached the Copa de la Reina final for the first time, losing to RCD Espanyol after extra time. On 5 January 2013, the team celebrated its tenth anniversary, beating Arsenal LFC in a friendly match. They were cup runners-up again in 2014, this time losing on penalties to FC Barcelona, having finished second behind the same club in the league.

On 5 June 2016, Athletic won its fifth league title, nine years after its last success. They competed in the UEFA Women's Champions League the following season, where they were eliminated by Danish champions Fortuna Hjorring in the Round of 32.

In June 2017, the club announced they would introduce a second reserve team for the coming season, made up of girls aged 13 to 15. Later that year, a club proposal to enter another girls team (12/13 years) into a local boys' youth league was rejected by the provincial council.

In January 2019, the club broke the European record for attendance at a women's football match with 48,121 spectators at San Mamés for a Copa de la Reina quarter-final fixture, a 2–0 loss to Atlético Madrid. (however, it only stood for a few months until Barcelona played Atlético in front of a 60,739 crowd). That match was the 14th played by the women's team in the two iterations of the club's main stadium since the first in 2003, with three more played there during the next year.

== Season to season ==
=== As Leioa EFT ===
Season	Division	Place	Copa de la Reina
2000–01	Reg.	1st	N/A
2001–02	1ª Nac.	1st	N/A

=== As Athletic Bilbao ===
Season	Division	Place	Copa de la Reina
2002–03	1ª	1st	Quarterfinals
2003–04	1ª	1st	Semifinals
2004–05	1ª	1st	Quarterfinals
2005–06	1ª	5th	Quarterfinals
2006–07	1ª	1st	Quarterfinals
2007–08	1ª	3rd	Quarterfinals
2008–09	1ª	3rd	Quarterfinals
2009–10	1ª	3rd	Quarterfinals
2010–11	1ª	3rd	Quarterfinals
2011–12	1ª	2nd	Runner-up
2012–13	1ª	2nd	Quarterfinals
2013–14	1ª	2nd	Runner-up
2014–15	1ª	3rd	Quarterfinals
2015–16	1ª	1st	Quarterfinals
2016–17	1ª	5th	Quarterfinals
2017–18	1ª	3rd	Semifinals
2018–19	1ª	5th	Quarterfinals
2019–20	1ª	5th	Semifinals
2020–21	1ª	11th	
2021–22	1ª	7th	Round of 16
2022–23	1ª	10th	Semifinals
2023–24	1ª	5th	Semifinals
2024–25	1ª	4th	Round of 16
2025–26	1ª	7th	Quarterfinals

== Honours ==
=== Titles ===
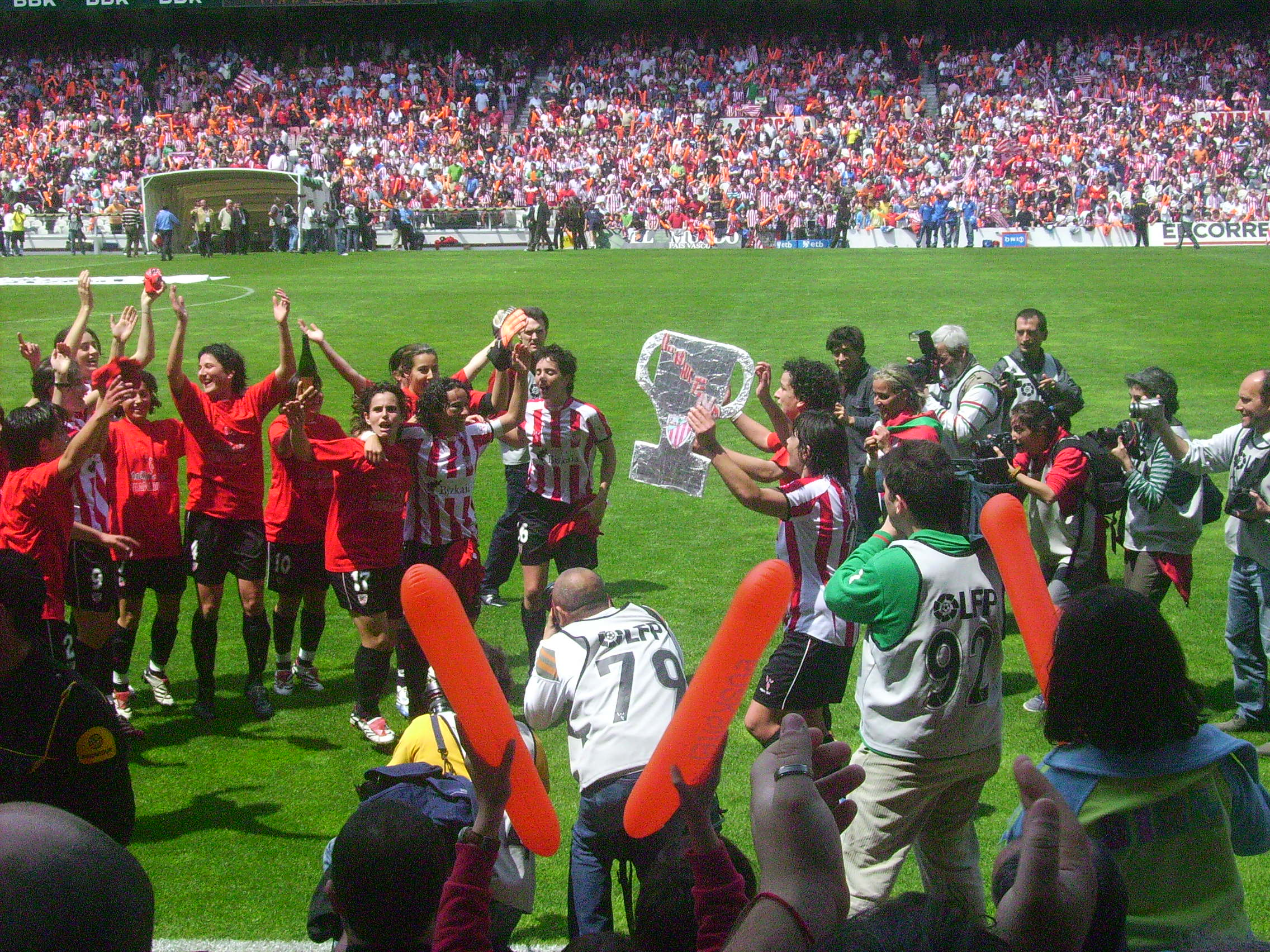
Athletic players celebrating the team's fourth championship on 6 May 2007 at San Mamés.

==== Official competitions ====
- Primera División (5): 2002–03, 2003–04, 2004–05, 2006–07, 2015–16
- Euskal Herria Cup (9): 2011, 2013, 2014, 2015, 2016, 2017, 2018, 2021, 2023

==== Invitational competitions ====
- Sport Mundi Tournament (4): 2006, 2007, 2011, 2012
- COTIF: 2015
- Teresa Herrera Trophy: 2017, 2018
- Ramón de Carranza Trophy: 2019, 2021

== UEFA competition record ==
Season	Competition	Stage	Result	Opponent	Scorers
2003–04	Women's Cup	Group stage	2–0; 5–2; 1–8	(Austria) Neulengbach (Portugal) 1º Dezembro (Germany) Frankfurt	Castrillo, Fernández; Iturregi 2, Angulo, Ferreira, Ibarra; Juaristi
2004–05	Women's Cup	Qualifying stage	10–3; 1–1; 5–0	(Northern Ireland) Newtownabbey Strikers (Israel) Maccabi Holon (Romania) Clujana	Sánchez 2, Fernández, Ferreira, Iturregi, Onaindia, Orueta, Vázquez, Zabala + 1 o.g. Juaristi; Fernández 2, Vázquez 2, Orueta
2004–05	Women's Cup	Group stage	2–2; 2–3; 5–1	(England) Arsenal (Sweden) Djurgården/Älvsjö (Greece) Aegina	Iturregi, Vázquez; Ferreira, Olabarrieta; Vázquez, Fernández, Ibarra, Murua
2005–06	Women's Cup	Qualifying stage	6–2; 3–0; 1–1	(Scotland) Glasgow City (Belgium) Rapide Wezemaal (Netherlands) Saestum	Vázquez 3, Fernández, Gurrutxaga, Juaristi; Fernández, Juaristi, Orueta; Fernández
2007–08	Women's Cup	Qualifying stage	4–0; 16–0; 0–1	(Slovenia) Krka Novo Mesto (Malta) Birkirkara (Italy) Bardolino	Díez, Ferreira, Murua, Vázquez; Vázquez 7, Juaristi 3, Olabarrieta 2, Díez, Iturregi, Murua, Sánchez
2016–17	Women's Champions League	Round of 32	2–1; 1–3 (a.e.t.)	(Denmark) Fortuna Hjørring	Corres, Oroz; Vázquez

== Players ==
=== Current squad ===
As of 26 August 2026 Note: Flags indicate national team as defined under FIFA eligibility rules; some limited exceptions apply. Players may hold more than one non-FIFA nationality.

No.	Pos.	Nation	Player
1	GK	ESP	Eunate Astralaga
2	DF	ESP	Maddi Torre
3	DF	ESP	Naia Landaluze
4	DF	GER	Bibiane Schulze-Solano
5	MF	ESP	Maite Valero
6	MF	ESP	Irene Oguiza (captain)
7	FW	ESP	Jone Amezaga
8	FW	ESP	Ane Campos
10	FW	ESP	Patricia Zugasti
11	FW	ESP	Ane Azkona
12	DF	ESP	Garazi Fácila

No.	Pos.	Nation	Player
13	GK	ESP	Adriana Nanclares
14	MF	ESP	Leire Baños
15	MF	ESP	Clara Pinedo
16	MF	ESP	Amaia Iribarren
17	FW	ESP	Daniela Agote
18	FW	ESP	Sara Ortega
19	FW	ESP	Maitane Vilariño
20	DF	ESP	Ane Elexpuru
21	DF	ESP	Marina Artero
22	DF	ESP	Amaia Martínez
23	DF	ESP	Eider Arana

=== Out on loan ===
Note: Flags indicate national team as defined under FIFA eligibility rules; some limited exceptions apply. Players may hold more than one non-FIFA nationality.

No.	Pos.	Nation	Player

=== Reserve team ===
Note: Flags indicate national team as defined under FIFA eligibility rules; some limited exceptions apply. Players may hold more than one non-FIFA nationality.

No.	Pos.	Nation	Player
26	GK	ESP	Ziara Vega
27	DF	ESP	Nerea Benito
28	GK	ESP	Elene Aldekoa
29	FW	ESP	Oihana Agirregomezkorta
30	MF	ESP	Alejandra Estefanía

No.	Pos.	Nation	Player
31	FW	GEQ	Thais Pargaray
32	DF	ESP	Irati Alfaro
33	MF	ESP	Elene Gurtubay
34	FW	ESP	Iraia Fernández

=== Former players ===
For details of current and former players, see Category:Athletic Club (women) players.

== See also ==
- Athletic–Barcelona rivalry
- Women's Basque derby
