= Aitziber Juaristi =

Spanish footballer (born 1976)

Personal information
- Full name: Aitziber Juaristi Caballero
- Date of birth: 28 May 1976 (age 50)
- Place of birth: Getxo, Spain
- Height: 1.63 m (5 ft 4 in)
- Position: Defender

Senior career*
Years	Team	Apps	(Gls)
- Bizkerre
- Sondika
2000–2002	Leioa		
2002–2013	Athletic Bilbao	221	(41)
2006	→ Atlético Madrid	2	(0)

International career
2006–2007	Basque Country	2	(0)
- * Club domestic league appearances and goals

Aitziber Juaristi Caballero (born 28 May 1976) is a Spanish retired footballer who played as a defender, mainly for Athletic Bilbao in the Spanish First Division. She was a founding member of the team, with whom she also played the European Cup. She later coached the club's 'C' (second reserve) squad.
