= Amaia Olabarrieta =

Spanish footballer (born 1982)

Personal information
- Full name: Amaia Olabarrieta Elordui
- Date of birth: 28 July 1982 (age 44)
- Place of birth: Lezama, Basque Country, Spain
- Height: 1.67 m (5 ft 6 in)
- Position: Midfielder

Senior career*
Years	Team	Apps	(Gls)
1999–2004	Bizkerre		
2004–2016	Athletic Bilbao	210	(28)

International career
2009–2012	Spain	10	(2)
2007–2012	Basque Country	2	(0)
- * Club domestic league appearances and goals

Amaia Olabarrieta Elordui (born 28 July 1982) is a Spanish former footballer who played for Athletic Bilbao and the Spain national team. An anterior cruciate ligament injury sustained in March 2014 eventually brought about Olabarrieta's retirement from football in 2016.

== Official international goals ==
- 2011 World Cup qualification
  - 1 in Spain 5–1 Turkey
- 2013 Euro qualification
  - 1 in Turkey 1–10 Spain
