= Iraia Iturregi =

Spanish footballer (born 1985)

Iraia
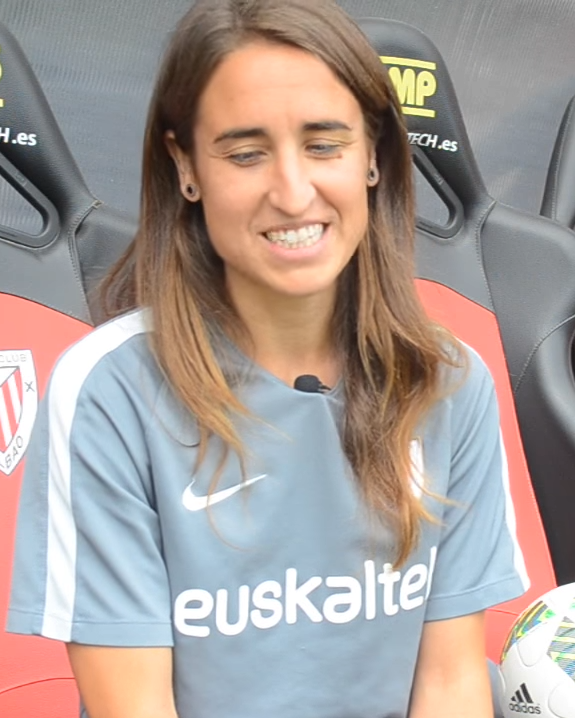
- Iturregi in 2017

Personal information
- Full name: Iraia Iturregi Sustatxa
- Date of birth: 24 April 1985 (age 41)
- Place of birth: Bilbao, Basque Country, Spain
- Height: 1.62 m (5 ft 4 in)
- Positions: Defender; midfielder

Team information
- Current team: Athletic Bilbao (head coach)

College career
| Years | Team | Apps | (Gls) |
| 2006 | Florida State Seminoles | 23 | (1) |

Senior career*
| Years | Team | Apps | (Gls) |
| 1999–2000 | CD Sondika | 14 | (2) |
| 2000–2002 | SD Leioa | 54 | (40) |
| 2002–2017 | Athletic Bilbao | 357 | (58) |

International career
- Spain U19
| 2004–2007 | Spain | 14 | (0) |
| 2006–2016 | Basque Country | 6 | (1) |

Managerial career
- 2019–2020: Athletic Bilbao B
- 2021–: Athletic Bilbao
- * Club domestic league appearances and goals

Iraia Iturregi Sustatxa (born 24 April 1985) is a Spanish retired football player who played as a midfielder for Athletic Bilbao of Spain's Primera División for most of her career. She currently acts as head coach of women's team Athletic Bilbao B.

== Club career ==
Despite playing all her entire career at Basque teams, Iturregi has also played in United States's NCAA for Florida State Seminoles.

In May 2017, she announced her retirement from playing professional football.

== International career ==
Iturregi has been a member of the Spanish national team. Previously she scored the winner in the final of the 2004 Under-19 European Championship, Spain's first triumph in women's football. Iturregi was the team's captain and top scorer joint with Jade Boho. Two months later she played her first match with the senior national team, against Norway in the 2005 European Championship qualifying.

== Honours ==
Athletic Bilbao

- Primera División: 2002–03, 2003–04, 2004–05, 2015–16

Spain U19

- UEFA Women's Under-19 Championship: 2004
