= Gurutze Fernández =

Spanish footballer (born 1979)

Guru
Personal information
- Full name: Gurutze Fernández Callejo
- Date of birth: 4 May 1979 (age 47)
- Place of birth: Urretxu, Spain
- Height: 1.60 m (5 ft 3 in)
- Position: Striker

Team information
- Current team: Athletic Bilbao
- Number: 21

Youth career
- Eibartarrak

Senior career*
Years	Team	Apps	(Gls)
2000–2003	Oiartzun		
2003–2007	Athletic Bilbao	99	(29)
2007–2009	Levante	47	(6)
2009–2013	Athletic Bilbao	110	(49)

International career^{‡}
2004–2007	Spain	5	(0)
2006–2012	Basque Country	3	(0)
- * Club domestic league appearances and goals as of 12:00, 15 September 2011 (UTC) ‡ National team caps and goals as of 12:00, 15 September 2011 (UTC)

Gurutze Fernández Callejo, commonly known as Guru (born 4 May 1979), is a Spanish retired football forward who represented Athletic Bilbao and Levante UD of the Primera División.

She has won Superliga Femenina four times—thrice with Athletic Bilbao and once with Levante UD. As of the end of the 2008–09 season she had scored 35 goals in 146 games played throughout six seasons in the Superliga. Guru returned to Athletic in October 2009 after two seasons away at Levante. She announced her retirement in July 2013, publishing an open letter of thanks to Athletic's club staff and supporters.
