= Irune Murua =

Spanish footballer (born 1986)

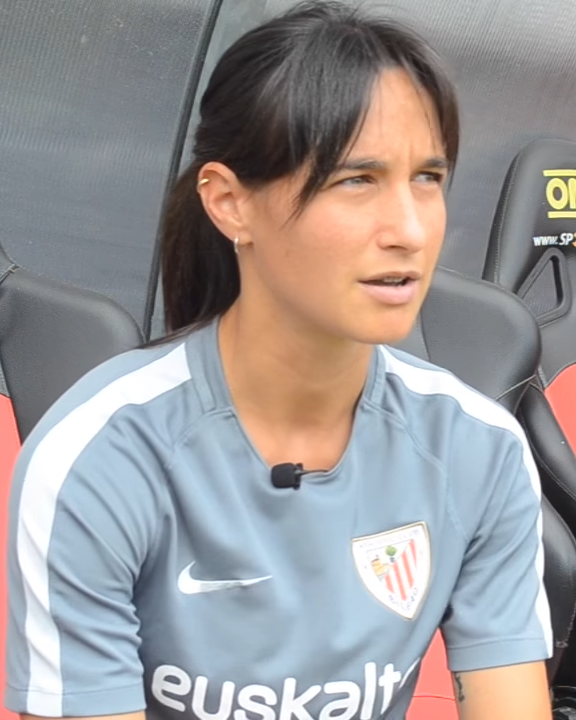

Personal information
- Full name: Irune Murua Cuesta
- Date of birth: 23 April 1986 (age 40)
- Place of birth: Barakaldo, Spain
- Height: 1.71 m (5 ft 7 in)
- Position: Striker

Senior career*
Years	Team	Apps	(Gls)
2001–2003	Retuerto SSD	62	(84)
2003–2004	Athletic Bilbao B	22	(16)
2003–2017	Athletic Bilbao	314	(106)

International career
- Spain U-19
2006–2012	Basque Country	3	(0)
- * Club domestic league appearances and goals as of 18 May 2017

Irune Murua Cuesta (born 23 April 1986) is a Spanish retired football forward who played for Athletic Bilbao of Spain's Primera División.

== Career ==
Murua was a member of the Spanish team that won the 2004 Under-19 European Championship, where she scored two goals in the two first matches against Switzerland and Finland.

In May 2017, she announced her retirement from professional football.

== Honours ==
=== Club ===
Athletic Bilbao

- Primera División (4): 2003–04, 2004–05, 2006–07, 2015–16

=== International ===
Spain

- UEFA Women's Under-19 Championship (1): 2004

== Personal life ==
Irune Murua is the daughter of former footballer Andoni Murua.
