= List of foreign Liga F players =

The Liga F is the highest league of women's football in Spain, starting in 1988. The following players must meet both of the following two criteria:

1. Have played at least one Liga F game. Players who were signed by Liga F clubs, but only played in lower leagues, cup games and/or European games, or did not play in any competitive games at all, are not included.
2. Are considered foreign, i.e., outside Spain determined by the following:

A player is considered foreign if she is not eligible to play for the national team of Spain.

More specifically,

- If a player has been capped on international level, the national team is used; if she has been capped by more than one country, the highest level (or the most recent) team is used. These include Spain players with dual citizenship.
- If a player has not been capped on international level, her country of birth is used, except those who were born abroad from Spanish parents or moved to Spain at a young age, and those who clearly indicated to have switched her nationality to another nation.

The first foreign player in Spain's highest women's league was Brazilian Milene Domingues who signed for Rayo Vallecano, but only trained with them due to the Royal Spanish Football Federation's regulations at the time not allowing foreigners to play in the league.

Clubs listed are those which have contracted the player. Note that calendar years are used. This follows general practice in expressing years a player spent at club.

In bold: players who are currently under contract by a Liga F club.

== Africa (CAF) ==
=== Algeria ===
- Lydia Miraoui – L'Estartit – 2010–11

=== Burkina Faso ===
- Madina Rouamba - Logrono - 2026
- Adama Congo - Logrono - 2026

=== Cameroon ===
- Aurelle Awona – Madrid CFF – 2020
- Ajara Nchout – Atlético Madrid – 2021
- Colette Ndzana – Granadilla Tenerife – 2023

=== Egypt ===
- Sara Ismael – Espanyol – 2015–16

=== Equatorial Guinea ===
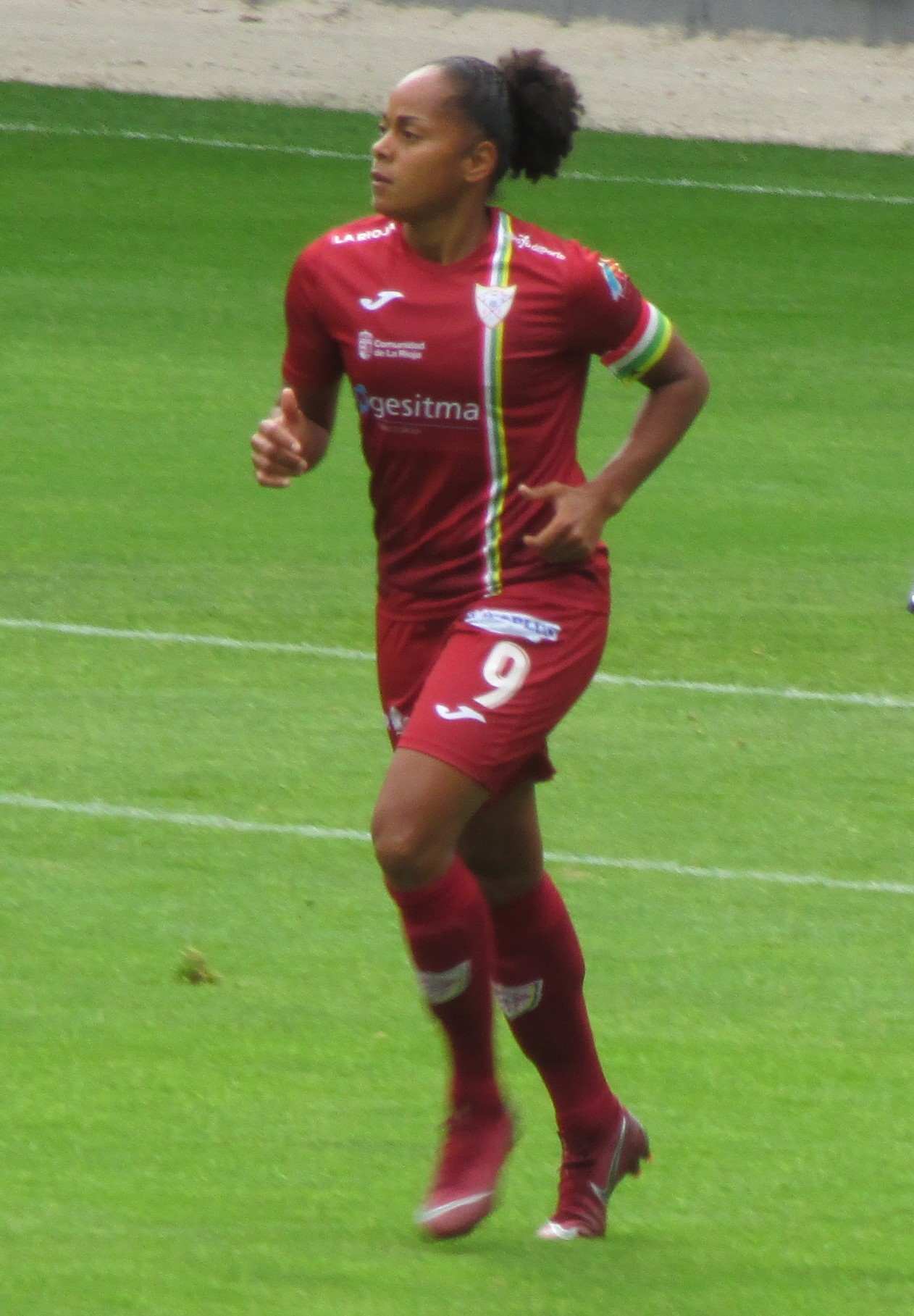
Jade Boho

- Genoveva Añonman – Atlético Madrid – 2016–17
- Dorine Chuigoué – Logroño – 2018–20, Real Betis – 2020–25
- Jade Boho – Torrejón – 2003–07, Rayo Vallecano – 2007–13, 2014–15, Atlético Madrid – 2013–14, Madrid CFF – 2017–18, Logroño – 2018–21, Alhama – 2022–23

=== Gambia ===
- **Fatou Kanteh** – Logroño – 2018–19, Sporting de Huelva – 2019–22, **Villarreal** – 2022–

=== Ghana ===
- Ernestina Abambila – Sporting de Huelva – 2020
- Mukarama Abdulai – Alavés – 2021–23
- Princella Adubea – Sporting de Huelva – 2019–20
- Grace Asantewaa – Logroño – 2019–21, Real Betis – 2021–23
- **Jacqueline Owusu** – **Real Sociedad** – 2023–
- Bénédicte Simon – Atlético Madrid – 2021–22, Levante Las Planas – 2023

=== Ivory Coast ===
- Jessica Aby – Alavés – 2022–23
- **Bernadette Amani** – **Eibar** – 2023–
- Rebecca Elloh – Logroño – 2020–21, Alavés – 2022–23
- Ida Guehai – Levante – 2017–18, Logroño – 2019–21
- **Ange N'Guessan** – Barcelona – 2016–17, **UD Tenerife** – 2017–

=== Kenya ===
- Cynthia Shilwatso – Logroño – 2020–21

=== Mali ===
- Bassira Touré – Málaga – 2018–19

=== Morocco ===
- Sana Daoudi – Atlético Madrid – 2017–18
- **Inés Faddi** – **Granada** – 2023–
- Anissa Lahmari – Levante Las Planas – 2023–2024, Levante – 2024–2025
- Yasmin Mrabet – Madrid CFF – 2017–20 ,Rayo Vallecano – 2020–21, Levante Las Planas – 2021–2024

=== Namibia ===
- Zenatha Coleman – Zaragoza CFF – 2018, Valencia – 2018–20, Sevilla – 2020–22

=== Nigeria ===
- Charity Adule – Eibar – 2020–21, Alhama – 2022–23
- Rasheedat Ajibade – Atlético Madrid – 2021–2025
- Roosa Ariyo – Granadilla Tenerife – 2021–22, Real Betis – 2022
- Rinsola Babajide – Real Betis – 2022–23, UD Tenerife – 2023–2025
- Rita Chikwelu – Madrid CFF – 2020–22, Levante Las Planas – 2022–23
- Ogonna Chukwudi – Madrid CFF – 2021
- Onome Ebi – Levante Las Planas – 2022–23
- Gift Monday – UD Tenerife – 2022–2025
- Osinachi Ohale – CD Tacón – 2019–20, Madrid CFF – 2021, Alavés – 2021–23
- Chidinma Okeke – Madrid CFF – 2019–21
- **Ngozi Okobi-Okeoghene** – **Levante Las Planas** – 2023–
- **Esther Okoronkwo** – **UD Tenerife** – 2023–
- Asisat Oshoala – Barcelona – 2019–2024
- **Toni Payne** – **Sevilla** – 2018–
- **Elisha Sulola** – **Valencia** – 2023–

=== Senegal ===
- **Hapsatou Malado Diallo** – **Eibar** – 2023–
- Mamy Ndiaye – Transportes Alcaine – 2014–15

=== South Africa ===
- **Ode Fulutudilu** – Málaga – 2019, **Real Betis** – 2023–
- Thembi Kgatlana – Eibar – 2020–21, Atlético Madrid – 2021–22
- **Noko Matlou** – **Eibar** – 2021–22, 2023–
- Nothando Vilakazi – Logroño – 2020–21

=== Zambia ===
- Barbra Banda – Logroño – 2018–20
- **Grace Chanda** – **Madrid CFF** – 2022–
- **Racheal Kundananji** – Eibar – 2021–22, **Madrid CFF** – 2022–

=== Zimbabwe ===
- Rutendo Makore – Sporting de Huelva – 2017–18

== Asia (AFC) ==
=== Australia ===
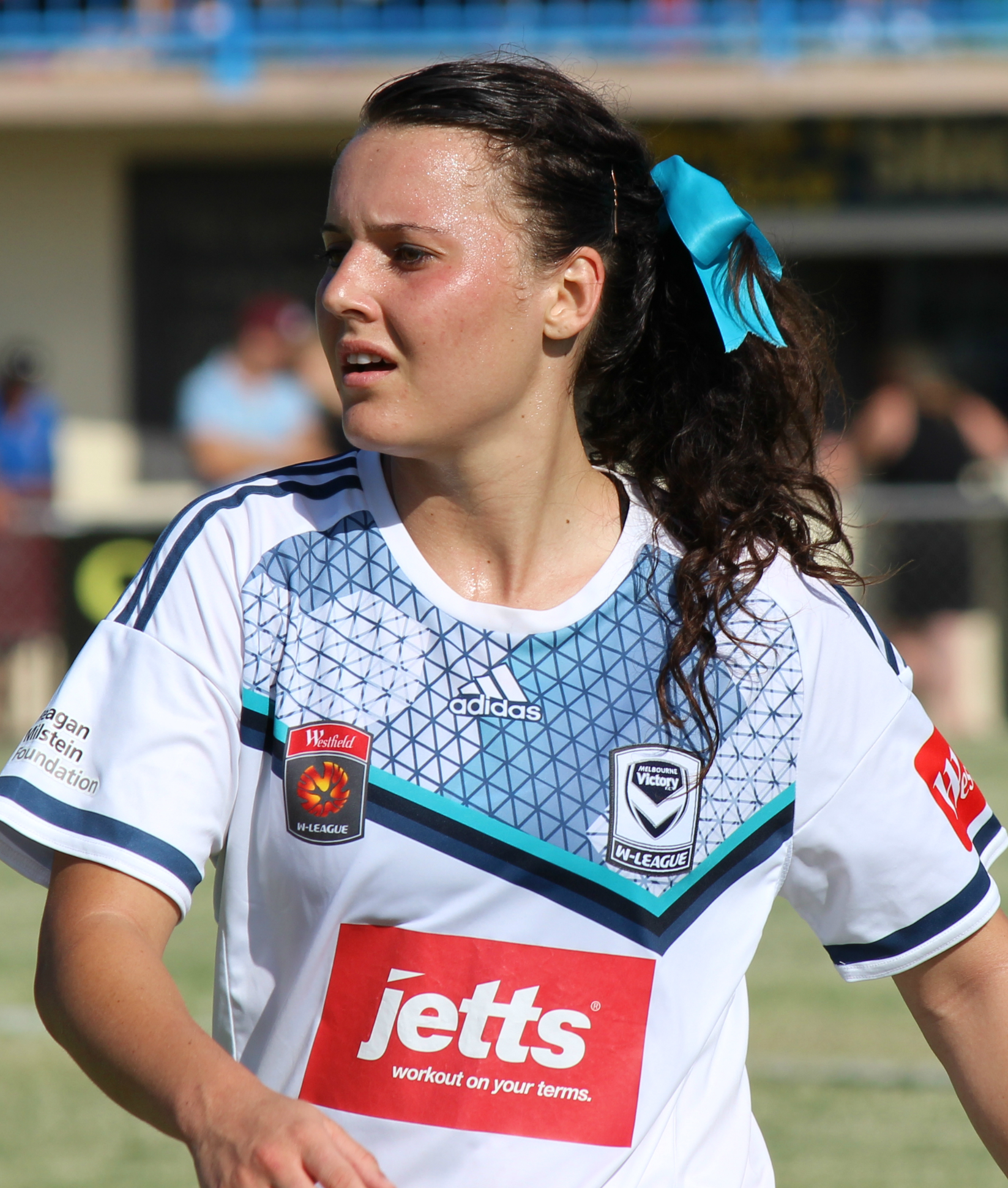
Hayley Raso

- Alex Chidiac – Atlético Madrid – 2018–20
- Beattie Goad – Granadilla Tenerife – 2021–22
- Aivi Luik – Levante – 2018–19, Sevilla – 2020–21
- **Anna Margraf** – **Sporting de Huelva** – 2023–
- Jenna McCormick – Real Betis – 2020
- Hayley Raso – Real Madrid – 2023–24

=== China ===
- **Tang Jiali** – Madrid CFF – 2022–23, **Levante Las Planas** – 2023–
- Yang Lina – Levante Las Planas – 2023

=== Chinese Taipei ===
- Chen Hsiao-chuan – Real Valladolid – 2010–11
- Lin Man-ting – Real Valladolid – 2010–11
- Tan Wen-lin – Real Valladolid – 2010–11

=== Japan ===
- Ayano Dozono – Granadilla Tenerife – 2016–19
- **Miku Ito** – Alavés – 2021–23, **Sporting de Huelva** – 2023–
- Mitsue Iwakura – Atlético Madrid – 2012–13, Valencia – 2013–15
- Ayaki Shinada – Espanyol – 2017–19
- Yoko Tanaka – Sporting de Huelva – 2019–21, Rayo Vallecano – 2021–22
- Hitomi Tomiyama – Santa Teresa – 2017–18
- Tomo Matsukawa – Albacete – 2016–19
- Maya Yamamoto – Valencia – 2016–17, Zaragoza – 2017–18, Deportivo La Coruña – 2019–20, Espanyol – 2020–21
- **Honoka Yonei** – **Eibar** – 2020–22, 2023–

=== South Korea ===
- Jang Sel-gi – Madrid CFF – 2019–20
- **Lee Young-ju** – **Madrid CFF** – 2022–

== Europe (UEFA) ==
=== Andorra ===
- **Teresa Morató** – Rayo Vallecano – 2020–21, **Villarreal** – 2021–

=== Austria ===
- Katharina Aufhauser – Sporting de Huelva – 2017–18
- **Annelie Leitner** – **Eibar** – 2023–
- Katja Trödthandl – Valencia – 2012–13
- Sarah Wronski – Valencia – 2012–14

=== Belgium ===
- **Jassina Blom** – **UD Tenerife** – 2021–

=== Bulgaria ===
- Silvia Radoyska – Sporting de Huelva – 2010

=== Croatia ===
- Doris Bačić – Levante Las Planas – 2022–23
- Ana Jelenčić – Sporting de Huelva – 2020

=== Czech Republic ===
- **Klára Cahynová** – Sevilla – 2021–2024, **Real Sociedad** – 2024–
- Alena Pěčková – Eibar – 2024–2026
- Andrea Stašková – Atlético Madrid – 2022–2023

=== Denmark ===
- Freja Abildå – Sporting de Huelva – 2021–22
- **Signe Bruun** – **Real Madrid** – 2023–
- Line Røddik Hansen – Barcelona – 2016–18
- Line Geltzer Johansen – Logroño – 2019–20
- **Malou Marcetto Rylov** – **Madrid CFF** – 2024–
- **Caroline Møller** – **Real Madrid** – 2021–
- Sille Struck – Rayo Vallecano – 2020–22, Levante Las Planas – 2022–23
- Sofie Svava – Real Madrid – 2022–24
- Julie Tavlo Petersson – Logroño – 2020–21

=== England ===
- **Chelsea Ashurst** – Málaga – 2008–12, 2018–19, **Sporting de Huelva** – 2012–13, 2019–, Barcelona – 2013–15
- Lucy Bronze – Barcelona – 2022–2024
- Toni Duggan – Barcelona – 2017–19, Atlético Madrid – 2019–21
- Shameeka Fishley – Logroño – 2021
- Jade Moore – Atlético Madrid – 2020
- Chloe Richards – Zaragoza – 2017
- Ellie Roebuck – Barcelona – 2024–2025
- Lianne Sanderson – Espanyol – 2011–12
- Chioma Ubogagu – Real Madrid – 2019–21
- Keira Walsh – Barcelona – 2022–2025

=== Estonia ===
- Lisette Tammik – Santa Teresa – 2020

=== Finland ===
- Jenny Danielsson – Sporting de Huelva – 2017
- **Sanni Franssi** – **Real Sociedad** – 2020–
- Riikka Hannula – Espanyol – 2017
- Linda Nyman – Logroño – 2021
- Iina Salmi – Valencia – 2020–2023
- Daniela Tjeder – Levante – 2005–06

=== France ===
- Baby Jordy Benera – Levante Las Planas – 2023–2024
- Élise Bussaglia – Barcelona — 2017–18
- Mylène Chavas – Real Madrid – 2023–2025
- Aminata Diallo – Atlético Madrid – 2021, Levante – 2023
- **Naomie Feller** – **Real Madrid** – 2022–
- Méline Gérard – Real Betis – 2019–21, Real Madrid – 2021–2023
- Jade Le Guilly – Real Sociedad – 2022–2023
- Kheira Hamraoui – Barcelona – 2018–21
- Sophie Istillart – Athletic Bilbao – 2020–22
- **Maëlle Lakrar** – **Real Madrid** – 2024–
- Emelyne Laurent – Atlético Madrid – 2020–21
- Morgane Nicoli – Sevilla – 2022–23, Levante Las Planas – 2023–2025
- Nina Richard – Costa Adeje Tenerife – 2024–2025
- **Romane Salvador** – **Espanyol** – 2023–
- **Sandie Toletti** – Levante – 2020–22, **Real Madrid** – 2022–

=== Georgia ===
- Tatiana Matveeva – Granadilla Tenerife – 2019–20

=== Germany ===
- Merle Barth – Atlético Madrid – 2023–25
- Turid Knaak – Atlético Madrid – 2020–21
- Leonie Pankratz – Levante – 2009–10
- Babett Peter – CD Tacón/Real Madrid – 2019–22
- **Bibiane Schulze** – **Athletic Bilbao** – 2020–21, 2022–, Valencia – 2021–22
- Michaela Specht – Real Sociedad – 2022–23

=== Hungary ===
- Réka Demeter – L'Estartit – 2011–12
- Viktória Víg – L'Estartit – 2011–12

=== Iceland ===
- **Berglind Rós Ágústsdóttir** – **Sporting de Huelva** – 2023–

=== Israel ===
- Diana Redman – Santa Teresa – 2015

=== Italy ===
- Martina Capelli – Espanyol – 2014–15, Sporting de Huelva – 2015–16
- Pamela Conti – Levante – 2008–09, 2010–11, Espanyol – 2009–10
- **Giulia Dragoni** – **Barcelona** – 2023–
- Katia Serra – Levante – 2010
- Martina Piemonte – Siviglia D – 2017-18, Betis D – 2019-20

=== Kazakhstan ===
- Irina Saratovtseva – Sporting de Huelva – 2010

=== Lithuania ===
- Liucija Vaitukaitytė – Granadilla Tenerife – 2018, Sevilla – 2019

=== Montenegro ===
- Slađana Bulatović – Albacete – 2018–19, Rayo Vallecano – 2019–22
- Armisa Kuč – Zaragoza – 2018, Málaga – 2018–19

=== Netherlands ===
- Selena Babb – Sporting de Huelva – 2019–20
- Mandy van den Berg – Valencia – 2018–20
- **Esmee Brugts** – **Barcelona** – 2023–
- **Merel van Dongen** – Real Betis – 2018–20, **Atlético Madrid** – 2020–
- **Eva van Deursen** – **Eibar** – 2024–
- Damaris Egurrola – Athletic Bilbao – 2015–20
- Stefanie van der Gragt – Barcelona – 2018–20
- Ellen Jansen – Valencia – 2020–22
- Lieke Martens – Barcelona – 2017–22
- Sari van Veenendaal – Atlético Madrid – 2019–20

=== North Macedonia ===
- **Nataša Andonova** – Barcelona – 2017–19, **Levante** – 2019–

=== Norway ===
- **Vilde Bøe Risa** – **Atlético Madrid** – 2023–
- Ingrid Syrstad Engen – Barcelona – 2021–2025
- **Caroline Graham Hansen** – **Barcelona** – 2019–
- **Kamilla Melgård** – **Madrid CFF** – 2024–
- **Synne Jensen** – Real Sociedad – 2022–2024, **Atlético Madrid** – 2024–

=== Poland ===
- Kayla Adamek – Granadilla Tenerife – 2020–21
- Patrycja Balcerzak – Sporting de Huelva – 2022–23
- Katarzyna Białoszewska – Sporting de Huelva – 2023
- Katarzyna Konat – Sporting de Huelva – 2023–24
- **Natalia Padilla** – **Sevilla** – 2024–
- **Ewa Pajor** – **Barcelona** – 2024–
- **Aleksandra Zaremba** – **UD Tenerife** – 2018–

=== Portugal ===
- Ana Borges – Prainsa Zaragoza – 2008–13, Atlético Madrid – 2013–14
- Rita Carneiro – Sporting de Huelva – 2006–09, Atlético Málaga – 2009–10
- Edite – Estudiantes de Huelva – 2004–05, Prainsa Zaragoza – 2008–09, 2010–12, Atlético Madrid – 2009–10
- **Matilde Fidalgo** – **Real Betis** – 2022–
- **Diana Gomes** – **Sevilla** – 2022–
- Mónica Gonçalves – Sporting de Huelva – 2009–10, L'Estartit – 2011–12
- Raquel Infante – L'Estartit – 2011–12, Llanos Olivenza – 2012–13, Levante – 2016–17
- **Andreia Jacinto** – **Real Sociedad** – 2022–
- Jamila – Prainsa Zaragoza – 2009–13, Espanyol – 2013–14
- Emily Lima – Prainsa Zaragoza – 2006–08, L'Estartit – 2008–09
- **Alice Marques (Note: First played for France national team, before joining Portugal national team)** – Valencia – 2024–2025, **Sevilla** – 2025–
- Sónia Matias – Prainsa Zaragoza – 2008–10, Espanyol – 2010–14
- Carolina Mendes – L'Estartit – 2011–12, Llanos Olivenza – 2012–13
- **Kika Nazareth** – **Barcelona** – 2024–
- Cláudia Neto – Prainsa Zaragoza – 2008–13, Espanyol – 2013–14
- Fátima Pinto – Santa Teresa – 2014–16, Alavés – 2022–23
- Tatiana Pinto – Levante – 2021–23
- Ritinha – Transportes Alcaine – 2014–15

=== Republic of Ireland ===
- Shauna Peare – Santa Teresa – 2021
- Tyler Toland – Levante – 2022–23

=== Romania ===
- Olivia Oprea – Sporting de Huelva – 2007–09, 2010–11, Sevilla – 2014–15, 2017–18, Levante – 2015–17, Villarreal – 2021–22, Alhama – 2022–23
- **Andreea Părăluță** – Atlético Madrid – 2016–18, **Levante** – 2018–
- Simona Vintilă – Barcelona – 2003–05

=== Russia ===
- Marina Fedorova – Real Betis – 2019–20
- Nadezhda Karpova – Valencia – 2017–19, Sevilla – 2019–20, Espanyol – 2020–21

=== Scotland ===
- **Caroline Weir** – **Real Madrid** – 2022–

=== Serbia ===
- Jelena Čanković – Barcelona – 2013–14
- **Allegra Poljak** – Granadilla Tenerife – 2019–21, Real Sociedad – 2021–23, Levante Las Planas – 2023–2024, **Madrid CFF** – 2024–

=== Slovakia ===
- **Patrícia Hmírová** – **Sporting de Huelva** – 2022–

=== Slovenia ===
- **Dominika Čonč** – Espanyol – 2017–18, Málaga – 2018–19, Valencia – 2021–22, **Levante Las Planas** – 2023–
- **Zala Meršnik** – **Sporting de Huelva** – 2022–

=== Sweden ===
- Kosovare Asllani – CD Tacón/Real Madrid – 2019–21
- Amanda Edgren – Sporting de Huelva – 2022–23
- **Sofia Hagman** – **Sporting de Huelva** – 2022–
- Sofia Jakobsson – CD Tacón/Real Madrid – 2019–22
- **Emma Holmgren** – **Levante** – 2023
- Cassandra Larsson – UD Tenerife – 2024
- Lova Lundin – Logroño – 2021
- **Hanna Lundkvist** – **Atlético Madrid** – 2021–
- **Freja Olofsson** – **Real Madrid** – 2022–
- Fridolina Rolfö – Barcelona – 2021–2025
- Therese Simonsson – Sporting de Huelva – 2022–23

=== Switzerland ===
- Vanessa Bernauer – Levante – 2010–13
- Viola Calligaris – Atlético Madrid – 2017–19, Valencia – 2019–20, Levante – 2020–23
- Ana-Maria Crnogorčević – Barcelona – 2019–23, Atlético Madrid – 2023–2024
- Stefanie da Eira – Real Betis – 2021–22, Sporting de Huelva – 2022–23
- Marina Keller – Levante – 2010–11, Sant Gabriel – 2011–12
- Caroline Müller – Levante – 2010–11
- **Livia Peng** – **Levante** – 2023–
- **Sydney Schertenleib** – **Barcelona** – 2024
- **Gaëlle Thalmann** – **Real Betis** – 2021–

=== Turkey ===
- Sejde Abrahamsson – Sevilla – 2020–21
- Jessica O'Rourke – Sporting de Huelva – 2009–10
- Birgül Sadıkoğlu – UD Tenerife – 2024

=== Ukraine ===
- Olha Ovdiychuk – Atlético Madrid – 2019–20

=== Wales ===
- **Rhiannon Roberts** – **Real Betis** – 2023–

== North, Central America and Caribbean (CONCACAF) ==
=== Bermuda ===
- **Kenni Thompson** – Espanyol – 2019–20, Deportivo La Coruña – 2020, Santa Teresa – 2021, **Eibar** – 2023–

=== Canada ===
- Marie-Yasmine Alidou – Sporting de Huelva – 2019–20
- **Jessica De Filippo** – **Sporting de Huelva** – 2023–

=== Costa Rica ===
- Wendy Acosta – Granadilla Tenerife – 2015–16
- Noelia Bermúdez – Levante – 2016–17, Valencia – 2017–18, Deportivo La Coruña – 2020–21
- Stephannie Blanco – Deportivo La Coruña – 2020–21, Sporting de Huelva – 2021–23
- Daniela Cruz – Espanyol – 2019–20
- Lixy Rodríguez – Santa Teresa – 2015–16

=== Dominican Republic ===
- Manuela Lareo – Athletic Bilbao – 2010–14, Valencia – 2014–15, Real Sociedad – 2015–21
- Lucía León – Madrid CFF – 2021, Real Betis – 2021–23

=== Guatemala ===
- **Andrea Álvarez** – **Eibar** – 2023–
- Ana Lucía Martínez – Rayo Vallecano – 2015–16, Sporting de Huelva – 2016–18, Madrid CFF – 2018–20

=== Jamaica ===
- **Tiffany Cameron** – **Real Betis** – 2023–
- Trudi Carter – Levante Las Planas – 2022–23
- **Kayla McKenna** – **Villarreal** – 2023–
- Siobhan Wilson – Málaga – 2018
- Zoe Matthews - Logrono - 2026

=== Martinique ===
- Emmeline Mainguy – Extremadura FCF – 2008–09, Santa Teresa – 2016–17

=== Mexico ===
- Charlyn Corral – Levante – 2015–19, Atlético Madrid – 2019–21
- Mariana Díaz Leal – Santa Teresa – 2017–18, 2020–21
- Maribel Domínguez – Barcelona – 2005–06, L'Estartit – 2007–12
- Greta Espinoza – Levante – 2017–18
- Mónica Flores – Valencia – 2018–20
- Sabrina Flores – Sevilla – 2019–20
- **Jimena López** – Eibar – 2021, **Valencia** – 2023–
- Kiana Palacios – Real Sociedad – 2018–21
- Patricia Pérez – Barcelona – 2005–06
- **Kenti Robles** – Espanyol – 2009–11, 2014–15, Barcelona – 2011–14, Atlético Madrid – 2015–20, **Real Madrid** – 2020–
- Mely Solís – Transportes Alcaine – 2014–15
- Pamela Tajonar – Atletico Málaga – 2011, Levante Las Planas – 2012, Sevilla – 2014–15, 2017–18, Barcelona – 2018–20, Logroño – 2020–21, Villarreal – 2021–22

=== Panama ===
- Aldrith Quintero – Alhama – 2023

=== Suriname ===
- Isabelle Hoekstra – Espanyol – 2024–25

=== United States ===
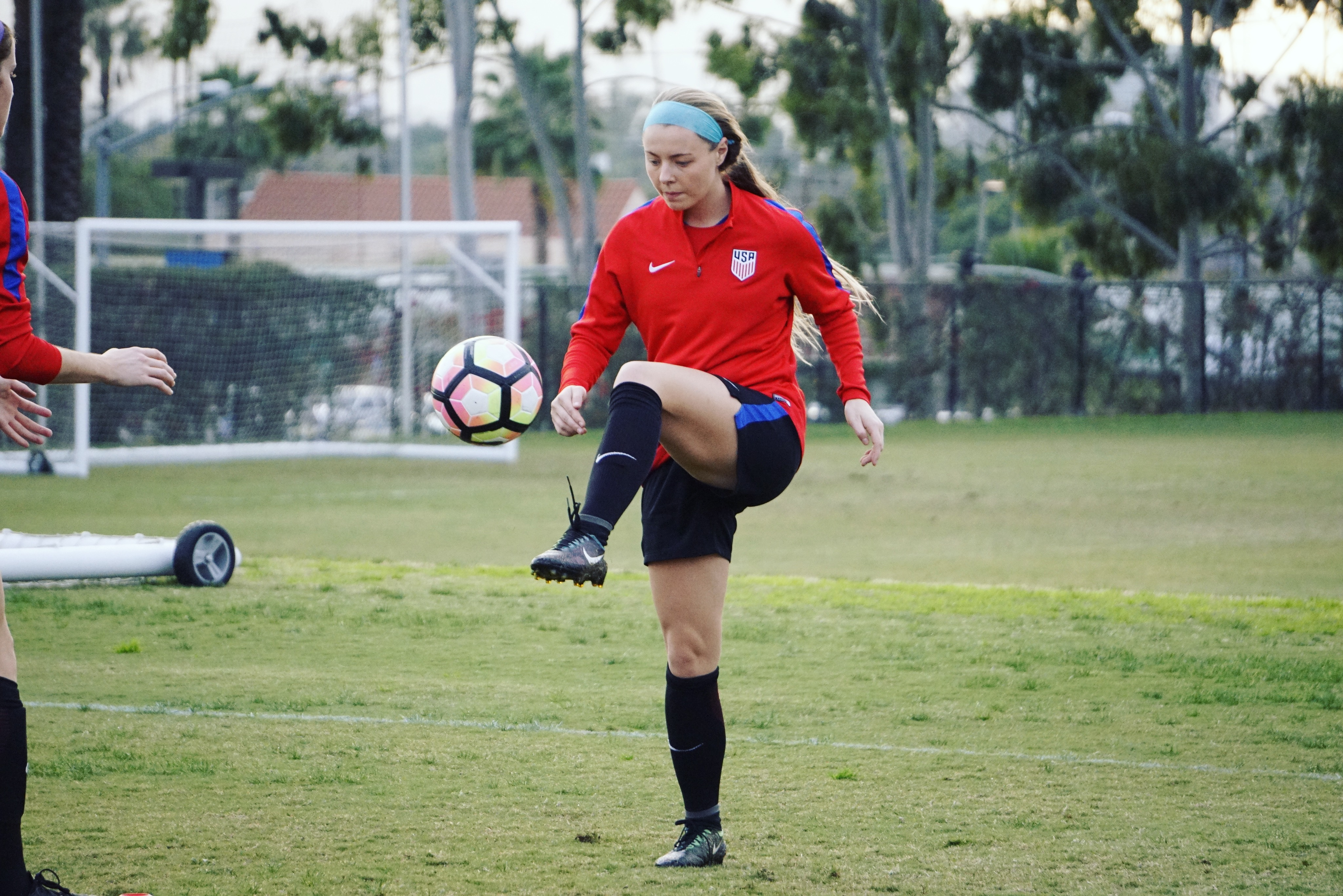
Danica Evans

- Kim Bonilla – Sporting de Huelva – 2009–10
- Anna Buhigas – Real Betis – 2019–20, Sporting de Huelva – 2020–21
- Jordan Clark – Alavés – 2021–22
- Megan Crosson – Granadilla Tenerife – 2017–18
- Cara Curtin – Valencia – 2019–20
- Samantha Dewey – Real Betis – 2019–20
- Emily Dolan – Real Betis – 2018–21, Sporting de Huelva – 2021–22
- Kelsey Dossey – Espanyol – 2019–21
- Danica Evans – Sporting de Huelva – 2020
- **Claire Falknor** – Logroño – 2018–19, Sevilla – 2019–20, Sporting de Huelva – 2020–21, **UD Tenerife** – 2021–
- Kristina Fisher – Sporting de Huelva – 2020–22
- Bri Folds – Real Betis – 2021–22
- **Amanda Frisbie** – Madrid CFF – 2019–21, Atlético Madrid – 2021–22, **Levante Las Planas** – 2023–
- Lydia Hastings – Transportes Alcaine – 2015–16
- Danielle Hayden – Rayo Vallecano – 2020–22
- Hannah Keane – Sporting de Huelva – 2021–22
- Athena Kühn – Sporting de Huelva – 2022–23
- Mariah Lee – Sporting de Huelva – 2022
- Joanna Lohman – Espanyol – 2011–12
- Cosette Morché – Valencia – 2022–23
- Natalie Muth – Eibar – 2021–22, Levante Las Planas – 2022–23
- Denali Murnan – Zaragoza CFF – 2017–18
- Katie Murray – Granadilla Tenerife – 2019–21
- Sydny Nasello – Granadilla Tenerife – 2022–23
- Clare Pleuler – Granadilla Tenerife – 2019–21, Real Sociedad – 2021–22
- Cami Privett – Logroño – 2018–19
- Jackie Simpson – Granadilla Tenerife – 2016–19, 2020–21
- Kylie Strom – Atlético Madrid – 2019–21

== South America (CONMEBOL) ==
=== Argentina ===
- Nerea Agüero – Sporting de Huelva – 2012–13, Sevilla – 2013–15
- **Estefanía Banini** – Valencia – 2016–17, Levante – 2018–21, **Atlético Madrid** – 2021–
- **Agustina Barroso** – Madrid CFF – 2018–19, **UD Tenerife** – 2023–
- **Florencia Bonsegundo** – Sporting de Huelva – 2018–19, Valencia – 2019–21, **Madrid CFF** – 2021–
- Ruth Bravo – Rayo Vallecano – 2019–21
- **Aldana Cometti** – Sevilla – 2019–20, Levante – 2020–22, **Madrid CFF** – 2022–
- Mariela Coronel – Transportes Alcaine – 2007–15, Atlético Madrid – 2015–16, Alhama – 2022
- Vanina Correa – Espanyol – 2020–21
- **Daiana Falfán** – **Granada** – 2024–
- Romina Ferro – Oviedo Moderno – 2007
- Clarisa Huber – Transportes Alcaine – 2008–09
- Ludmila Manicler – Barcelona – 2011–12
- **Romina Núñez** – **Betis** – 2024–
- Andrea Ojeda – Albacete – 2017–18
- Florencia Quiñones – Barcelona – 2011–13
- Yamila Rodríguez – Santa Teresa – 2017–18
- Vanesa Santana – Logroño – 2018–20, Sporting de Huelva – 2020–23
- Marianela Szymanowski – Atlético Madrid – 2008–11, Rayo Vallecano – 2011–16, Valencia – 2016–18, Real Betis – 2018–20, Espanyol – 2020–21

=== Brazil ===
- **Aline** – **UD Tenerife** – 2018–
- Ana Vitória – Atlético Madrid – 2014
- Andressa – Barcelona – 2016–19
- **Antônia** – Madrid CFF – 2020–22, **Levante** – 2022–
- **Jujuba Cardozo** – Granadilla Tenerife – 2019–20, **Eibar** – 2020–21, 2023–
- **Ana Carol** – Logroño – 2020, **Sporting de Huelva** – 2020–
- Érika – Oviedo Moderno – 2013–16, Deportivo La Coruña – 2019–20
- Fabiana – Sporting de Huelva – 2007–08, Barcelona – 2017–18
- **Gabi Nunes** – Madrid CFF – 2021–23, **Levante** – 2023–
- Geyse – Madrid CFF – 2017–18, 2020–22, Barcelona – 2022–23
- **Gio Queiroz** – Madrid CFF – 2018–20, 2024, Barcelona – 2020–21, Levante – 2021–22, **Atlético Madrid** – 2024–
- Isadora – Logroño – 2019–20, Rayo Vallecano – 2020–22
- **Kathellen** – **Real Madrid** – 2022–
- Kátia – Estudiantes de Huelva – 2004–05, Levante – 2005–06
- **Lauren** – **Atlético Madrid** – 2024–
- **Luany** – **Madrid CFF** – 2023–
- **Ludmila** – **Atlético Madrid** – 2017–
- Millene Cabral – Rayo Vallecano – 2021–22
- **Mônica** – Atlético Madrid – 2017–18, **Madrid CFF** – 2019–
- Nágela – Logroño – 2018–20
- Simone – Rayo Vallecano – 2004–05
- **Thaís** – **UD Tenerife** – 2022–
- Vânia – Levante – 2006–07, Llanos de Olivenza – 2012–13, Santa Teresa – 2014–17

=== Chile ===
- **Karen Araya** – Sevilla – 2018–19, 2022, **Madrid CFF** – 2022–
- Yanara Aedo – Valencia – 2016–17, 2018–19, Sevilla – 2019–20, Rayo Vallecano – 2020–22
- **Antonia Canales** – **Valencia** – 2023–
- Paula Garmendia – Collerense – 2014–16
- Sofía Hartard – Sporting de Huelva – 2017–18
- **Francisca Lara** – Sporting de Huelva – 2017–18, Sevilla – 2018–20, **Villarreal** – 2021–
- Geraldine Leyton – Sporting de Huelva – 2018
- Nayadet López – Valencia – 2010–13, Santa Teresa – 2016–18, 2020–21
- Yessenia López – Sporting de Huelva – 2018–19
- **Camila Sáez** – Rayo Vallecano – 2018–22, Alavés – 2022–23, **Madrid CFF** – 2023–
- Bárbara Santibáñez – Sporting de Huelva – 2017–18
- Ámbar Soruco – Logroño – 2018–19
- Javiera Toro – Sevilla – 2020–22, Granadilla Tenerife – 2022–23

=== Colombia ===
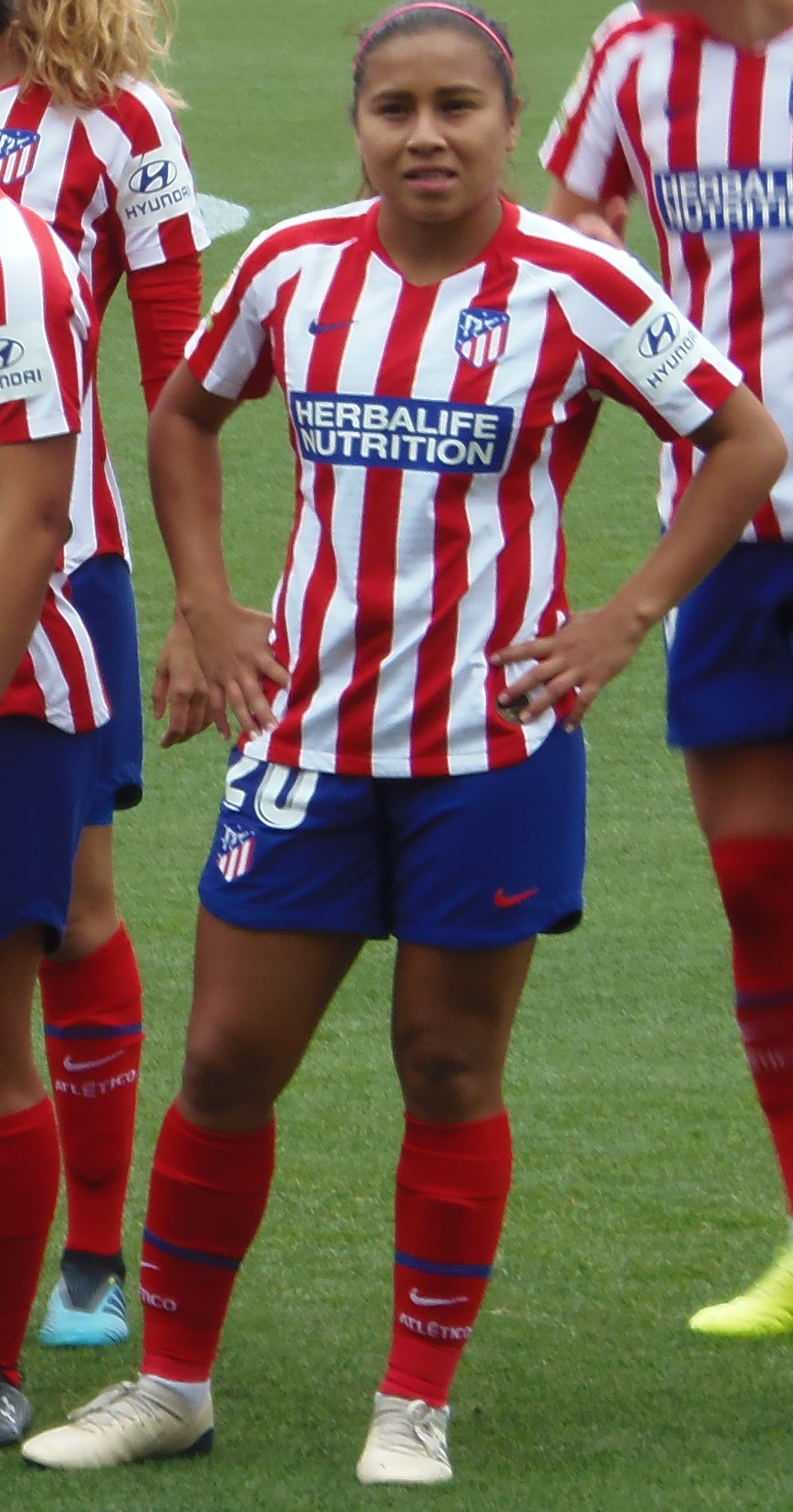
Leicy Santos

- Lady Andrade – Sporting de Huelva – 2013, Deportivo La Coruña – 2020–21
- Carolina Arbeláez – Deportivo La Coruña – 2020–21
- Lorena Bedoya – Deportivo La Coruña – 2020–21
- **Linda Caicedo** – **Real Madrid** – 2023–
- Daniela Caracas – Logroño – 2020–21
- **Ivonne Chacón** – **Valencia** – 2022–
- Ángela Clavijo – Sporting de Huelva – 2019–21
- Vanessa Córdoba – Albacete – 2018–19
- Natalia Gaitán – Transportes Alcaine – 2013–14, Valencia – 2015–20, Sevilla – 2020–22
- Sofía García – Sporting de Huelva – 2021
- Daniela Montoya – Levante – 2016
- Catalina Pérez – Real Betis – 2021–22
- Mayra Ramírez – Sporting de Huelva – 2020–22, Levante – 2022–24
- Nicole Regnier – Rayo Vallecano – 2015–16
- **Gisela Robledo** – **UD Tenerife** – 2021–
- Leicy Santos – Atlético Madrid – 2019–2024
- **Liced Serna** – **Valencia** – 2022–
- **Manuela Vanegas** – Espanyol – 2019–21, **Real Sociedad** – 2021–
- Oriánica Velásquez – Transportes Alcaine – 2013–14

=== Ecuador ===
- **Kerlly Real** – **Valencia** – 2020–

=== Paraguay ===
- Lice Chamorro – Sporting de Huelva – 2018–19, Alavés – 2021–23
- **Jessica Martínez** – CD Tacón/Real Madrid – 2019–21, Sevilla – 2021–23, **Levante Las Planas** – 2023–
- Dulce Quintana – Espanyol – 2017–21
- Gloria Villamayor – Zaragoza – 2016–17

=== Peru ===
- **Pierina Núñez** – Logroño – 2019–21, **Real Betis** – 2022–

=== Uruguay ===
- **Yannel Correa** – Albacete – 2017–18, **Sporting de Huelva** – 2023–
- **Pamela González** – Málaga – 2018–19, **Sevilla** – 2023–
- Stefanía Maggiolini – L'Estartit – 2007–12, Llanos de Olivenza – 2013
- **Esperanza Pizarro** – **Eibar** – 2023–

=== Venezuela ===
- **Oriana Altuve** – Rayo Vallecano – 2018–20, Real Betis – 2020–21, **Valencia** – 2021–
- Wilmary Argüelles – Granadilla Tenerife – 2020–23
- **Nayluisa Cáceres** – Granadilla Tenerife – 2018–23, **Levante Las Planas** – 2023–
- **Raiderlin Carrasco** – **Sporting de Huelva** – 2022–
- Deyna Castellanos – Atlético Madrid – 2020–22
- **Gaby García** – Deportivo La Coruña – 2019–21, Real Sociedad – 2021–23, **Atlético Madrid** – 2023–
- **Yenifer Giménez** – **Villarreal** – 2021–
- Wanda Gómez – Granadilla Tenerife – 2016–17
- **Verónica Herrera** – **UD Tenerife** – 2022–
- Sandra Luzardo – Albacete – 2018–19
- Kika Moreno – Deportivo La Coruña – 2019–21
- **Yerliane Moreno** – **UD Tenerife** – 2020–
- Michelle Romero – Deportivo La Coruña – 2019–21

== Notes ==
1. Born in Cameroon
2. Born in Canada
3. Born in the Democratic Republic of the Congo
4. Born in England
5. Born in Spain
6. Born in Finland
7. Born in France
8. Born in Italy
9. Born in Morocco
10. Born in the Netherlands
11. Born in Sweden
12. Born in Ukraine
13. Born in the United States
14. Capped for the Canada women's national team
15. Capped for the England women's national under-21 team
16. Capped for the Spain women's national team
17. Capped for the Spain women's national under-17 team
18. Capped for the Spain women's national under-19 team
19. Capped for the Spain women's national under-23 team
20. Capped for the Finland women's national under-20 team
21. Capped for the France women's national under-20 team
22. Capped for the Netherlands women's national under-23 team
23. Capped for the Portugal women's national team
24. Capped for the Sweden women's national under-15 team
25. Capped for the Sweden women's national under-23 team
26. Capped for the United States women's national under-17 team
27. Capped for the United States women's national under-20 team
28. Capped for the United States women's national under-23 team
