= 2019–20 Primera División (women) =

Spanish women's 1st tier association football season

Primera División
- Season: 2019–20
- Dates: 7 September 2019 – 6 May 2020
- Teams: 16
- Champions: Barcelona; 5th title
- Relegated: Not relegated
- Champions League: Barcelona; Atlético de Madrid
- Matches: 152
- Goals: 464 (3.05 per match)
- Top goalscorer: Jennifer Hermoso (23 goals)
- Biggest home win: Barcelona 9–1 Tacón (7 September 2019)
- Biggest away win: Tacón 0–6 Barcelona (11 January 2020)
- Highest scoring: Barcelona 9–1 Tacón (7 September 2019)
- Longest winning run: Barcelona (15 matches)
- Longest unbeaten run: Barcelona (21 matches)
- Longest winless run: Espanyol (21 matches)
- Longest losing run: Valencia (5 matches)
- Highest attendance: 32,068; Athletic Club 0–3 Barcelona (5 January 2020)

The 2019–20 Primera División Femenina de Fútbol was the 32nd edition of Spain's highest women's football league, the 19th since the inception of the Superliga Femenina.

On 6 May 2020, the Royal Spanish Football Federation announced the premature end of the league due to the COVID-19 pandemic, revoking relegations and naming Barcelona as league champions five years after their last title. Also, it was approved the expansion of the league to 18 teams for the 2020–21 season.

== Overview ==
Round 9 was postponed due to a strike of the players claiming for a collective agreement to improve their work conditions.

== Teams ==
Location of the 2019–20 Primera División teams
Canary Islands location of the 2019–20 Primera División teams

Deportivo and Tacón promoted from Segunda División. Both teams made their debut in the top tier and replaced Málaga and Fundación Albacete, that were relegated as the two last qualified in the previous edition.

=== Stadia and locations ===
Team	Home city	Stadium
Athletic Club	(Basque Country (autonomous community)) Bilbao	Lezama
Atlético de Madrid	(Community of Madrid) Madrid	Centro Deportivo Wanda
Barcelona	(Catalonia) Barcelona	Johan Cruyff
Betis	(Andalusia) Seville	Luis del Sol
Deportivo	(Galicia (Spain)) A Coruña	Cidade Deportiva de Abegondo
Espanyol	(Catalonia) Barcelona	Dani Jarque
Granadilla	(Canary Islands) Granadilla de Abona	La Palmera
Levante	(Valencian Community) Valencia	Buñol
Logroño	(La Rioja) Logroño	Las Gaunas
Madrid CFF	(Community of Madrid) San Sebastián de los Reyes	Nuevo Matapiñonera
Rayo Vallecano	(Community of Madrid) Madrid	Ciudad Deportiva
Real Sociedad	(Basque Country (autonomous community)) San Sebastián	Zubieta
Sevilla	(Andalusia) Seville	Jesús Navas
Sporting de Huelva	(Andalusia) Huelva	Nuevo Colombino
Tacón	(Community of Madrid) Madrid	Ciudad Real Madrid
Valencia	(Valencian Community) Valencia	Antonio Puchades

=== Personnel and sponsorship ===
Team	Head coach	Captain	Kit manufacturer	Main shirt sponsor
Athletic Club	Ángel Villacampa	Ainhoa Tirapu	New Balance	Kutxabank
Atlético de Madrid	Dani González	Amanda Sampedro	Nike	Herbalife
Barcelona	Lluís Cortés	Vicky Losada	Nike	Stanley
Betis	Pier Luigi Cherubino	Irene Guerrero	Kappa	
Deportivo	Manu Sánchez	Míriam Ríos	Macron	Abanca
Espanyol	Jordi Ferrón	Paloma Fernández	Kelme	Ilumax
Granadilla	Francis Díaz	Cindy García	Erreà	Egatesa
Levante	María Pry	Alharilla Casado	Macron	Germaine de Capuccini
Logroño	Gerardo García	Rebeca Moreno	Joma	Gesitma
Madrid CFF	Óscar Fernández	Paola Ulloa	Adidas	Casino Gran Madrid
Rayo Vallecano	Carlos Santiso	Alicia Gómez	Kelme	
Real Sociedad	Gonzalo Arconada	Nahikari Garcia	Macron	Euskaltel
Sevilla	Cristian Toro	Alicia Fuentes	Nike	Marathonbet
Sporting de Huelva	Antonio Toledo	Anita Hernández	John Smith	Huelva
Tacón	David Aznar	Malena Ortiz	Adidas	
Valencia	José López Bargues	Gio Carreras	Puma	

=== Managerial changes ===
Team	Outgoing manager	Date of vacancy	Manner of departure	Position in table	Incoming manager	Date of appointment
Granadilla	Pier Luigi Cherubino	5 May 2019	Resigned	Pre-season	David Amaral	5 May 2019
Betis	María Pry	9 May 2019	Resigned	Pre-season	Antonio Contreras	22 May 2019
Levante	Kino	10 May 2019	Mutual consent	Pre-season	María Pry	4 June 2019
Rayo Vallecano	Irene Ferreras	23 May 2019	Resigned	Pre-season	Jéssica Rodríguez	1 July 2019
Athletic Club	Joseba Agirre	23 May 2019	Mutual consent	Pre-season	Ángel Villacampa	23 May 2019
Logroño	Chechu Martínez	30 May 2019	Resigned	Pre-season	Gerardo García	12 June 2019
Valencia	Carolina Miranda	31 May 2019	Signed as director of football	Pre-season	Irene Ferreras	7 June 2019
Madrid CFF	Manuel Aguado	26 July 2019		Pre-season	Óscar Fernández	26 July 2019
Rayo Vallecano	Jéssica Rodríguez	16 August 2019	Sacked	Pre-season	Carlos Santiso	16 August 2019
Atlético de Madrid	José Luis Sánchez Vera	8 October 2019	Resigned	3rd	Pablo López	16 August 2019
Espanyol	Salvador Jaspe	10 December 2019	Sacked	16th	Jordi Ferrón	10 December 2019
Granadilla	David Amaral	23 December 2019	Sacked	10th	Ayoze Díaz	27 December 2019
Betis	Antonio Contreras	23 December 2019	Sacked	15th	Pier Luigi Cherubino	29 December 2019
Granadilla	Ayoze Díaz	15 January 2020	Resigned	9th	Antonio González	15 January 2020
Atlético de Madrid	Pablo López	20 January 2020	Sacked	2nd	Dani González	21 January 2020
Granadilla	Antonio González	20 January 2020	End of tenure as caretaker	10th	Francis Díaz	20 January 2020
Valencia	Irene Ferreras	2 February 2020	Sacked	14th	Carolina Miranda	2 February 2020
Valencia	Carolina Miranda	12 February 2020	End of tenure as caretaker	14th	José López Bargues	12 February 2020

== List of foreign players ==
(Italic)Players has come in Winter transfer

Athletic Club

- 'no foreign players'

Ex foreign players: Summer

- None

Winter

- None

Atlético de Madrid

- (Netherlands) Sari van Veenendaal
- (Colombia) Carolina Arias
- (Italy) Elena Linari
- (Mexico) Kenti Robles
- (United States) Kylie Strom
- (France) Aïssatou Tounkara
- (Australia) Alex Chidiac
- (Colombia) Leicy Santos
- (Venezuela) Deyna Castellanos
- (Mexico) Verónica Corral
- (England) Toni Duggan
- (Brazil) Ludmilla
- (Ukraine) Olha Ovdiychuk

Ex foreign players: Summer

- (Switzerland) Jennifer Oehrli
- (France) Aurélie Kaci
- (Portugal) Dolores Silva
- (Switzerland) Viola Calligaris

Winter

- (Ukraine) Natiya Pantsulaya

Barcelona

- (Mexico) Pamela Tajonar
- (Switzerland) Ana-Maria Crnogorčević
- (Netherlands) Stefanie van der Gragt
- (France) Kheira Hamraoui
- (Norway) Caroline Graham Hansen
- (Netherlands) Lieke Martens
- (Nigeria) Asisat Oshoala

Ex foreign Players: Summer

- (Brazil) Andressa Alves
- (North Macedonia) Nataša Andonova

Winter

- None

Betis

- (United States) Anna Buhigas
- (United States) Emily Dolan
- (France) Méline Gérard
- (Azerbaijan) Marta Perarnau
- (Netherlands) Merel van Dongen
- (United States) Samantha Dewey
- (Argentina) Marianela Szymanowski
- (Cameroon) Michaela Abam
- (South Africa) Jermaine Seoposenwe

Ex foreign players: Summer

- THERE ISN'T ANY

Winter

- (Russia) Marina Fedorova

Deportivo

- (Colombia) Lorena Bedoya
- (Colombia) Carolina Arbeláez
- (Venezuela) Kika Moreno
- (Japan) Maya Yamamoto
- (Venezuela) Gabriela García
- (Venezuela) Michelle Romero

Ex foreign players: Summer

- THERE ISN'T ANY

Winter

- THERE ISN'T ANY

Espanyol

- (United States) Kelsey Dossey
- (Costa Rica) Daniela Cruz
- (Paraguay) Dulce Quintana
- (Colombia) Manuela Vanegas
- (Costa Rica) Katherine Alvarado
- (Bermuda) Kenni Thompson

Ex foreign players: Summer

- THERE ISN'T ANY

Winter

- THERE ISN'T ANY

Granadilla

- (Brazil) Aline Reis
- (Venezuela) Nayluisa Cáceres
- (Brazil) Jujuba
- (Cameroon) Raissa Feudjio
- (Brazil) Joyce
- (United States) Katie Murray
- (United States) Clare Pleuler
- (Canada) Kayla Adamek
- (Georgia (country)) Tatiana Matveeva
- (Ivory Coast) Ange N'Guessan
- (Serbia) Allegra Poljak

Ex foreign players: Summer

- (United States) Jackie Simpson

Winter

- THERE ISN'T ANY

Levante

- (Romania) Andreea Părăluță
- (Brazil) Jucinara
- (Argentina) Estefanía Banini
- (North Macedonia) Nataša Andonova

Ex foreign players: Summer

- (Australia) Aivi Luik
- (Portugal) Jéssica Silva
- (Mexico) Verónica Corral

Winter

- THERE ISN'T ANY

Logroño

- (Denmark) Line Johansen
- (Brazil) Ana Carol
- (Colombia) Daniela Caracas
- (Equatorial Guinea) Dorine Chuigoué
- (Ghana) Grace Asantewaa
- (Argentina) Vanesa Santana
- (Zambia) Barbra Banda
- (Brazil) Dany Helena
- (Ivory Coast) Ida Guehai
- (Equatorial Guinea) Jade Boho Sayo
- (Brazil) Isadora Freitas
- (Peru) Pierina Núñez

Ex foreign players: Summer

- (United States) Claire Falknor

Winter

- THERE ISN'T ANY

Madrid CFF

- (Brazil) Antônia
- (Cameroon) Aurelle Awona
- (United States) Amanda Frisbie
- (South Korea) Jang Sel-gi
- (Nigeria) Chidinma Okeke
- (Norway) Ingrid Wold
- (Brazil) Bruna Tavares
- (Nigeria) Rita Chikwelu
- (Brazil) Geyse
- (Brazil) Giovanna Crivelari
- (Brazil) Valéria

Ex foreign players: Summer

- (Germany) Eunice Beckmann

Winter

- THERE ISN'T ANY

Rayo Vallecano

- (Chile) Carla Guerrero
- (Chile) Camila Sáez
- (Argentina) Linda Bravo
- (Venezuela) Oriana Altuve
- (Montenegro) Slađana Bulatović
- (Argentina) Yael Oviedo
- (Uganda) Natasha Shirazi

Ex foreign players: Summer

- (Azerbaijan) Marta Perarnau

Winter

- THERE ISN'T ANY

Real Sociedad

- (Mexico) Kiana Palacios

Ex foreign players: Summer

- None

Winter

- None

Sevilla

- (Argentina) Aldana Cometti
- (Colombia) Isabella Echeverri
- (Mexico) Sabrina Flores
- (United States) Claire Falknor
- (Chile) Yanara Aedo
- (United States) Toni Payne
- (Nigeria) Uchenna Kanu
- (Lithuania) Liucija Vaitukaitytė
- (Poland) Emilia Zdunek

Ex foreign players: Summer

- (Chile) Karen Araya

Winter

- None

Sporting de Huelva

- (England) Chelsea Ashurst
- (Netherlands) Selena Babb
- (Colombia) Korina Clavijo
- (Croatia) Ana Jelenčić
- (Romania) Elena Pavel
- (Ghana) Ernestina Abambila
- (Japan) Yoko Tanaka
- (Ghana) Princella Adubea
- (Canada) Marie-Yasmine Alidou
- (United States) Danica Evans
- (United States) Kristina Fisher

Ex foreign players: Summer

- (Argentina) Florencia Bonsegundo

Winter

- None

Tacón

- (Brazil) Daiane Limeira
- (Nigeria) Osinachi Ohale
- (Germany) Babett Peter
- (Azerbaijan) Samara Ortiz Cruz
- (France) Aurélie Kaci
- (Azerbaijan) Malena Ortiz
- (Brazil) Thaisa
- (Sweden) Kosovare Asllani
- (Sweden) Sofia Jakobsson
- (Paraguay) Jessica Martínez
- (England) Chioma Ubogagu

Ex foreign players: Summer

- (Argentina) Linda Bravo

Winter

- None

Valencia

- (Netherlands) Jennifer Vreugdenhil
- (Switzerland) Viola Calligaris
- (Mexico) Mónica Flores
- (Netherlands) Mandy van den Berg
- (Argentina) Florencia Bonsegundo
- (Colombia) Natalia Gaitán
- (Namibia) Zenatha Coleman
- (United States) Cara Curtin

Ex foreign players: Summer

- (Chile) Yanara Aedo
- (Brazil) Jucinara

Winter

- None

== League table ==
=== Standings ===
Pos	Team	Pld	W	D	L	GF	GA	GD	Pts	Qualification or relegation
1	Barcelona (C)	21	19	2	0	86	6	+80	59	Qualification for the UEFA Champions League
2	Atlético de Madrid	21	15	5	1	43	17	+26	50	Qualification for the UEFA Champions League
3	Levante	21	14	3	4	40	21	+19	45	
4	Deportivo	21	11	4	6	46	38	+8	37	
5	Athletic Club	21	10	5	6	30	23	+7	35	
6	Real Sociedad	21	9	6	6	33	26	+7	33	
7	Logroño	21	8	5	8	31	41	−10	29	
8	Rayo Vallecano	21	7	7	7	24	33	−9	28	
9	Granadilla	21	6	6	9	24	35	−11	24	
10	Tacón	21	6	5	10	33	48	−15	23	
11	Sevilla	21	6	4	11	25	33	−8	22	
12	Betis	21	4	8	9	25	33	−8	20	
13	Madrid CFF	21	5	4	12	22	45	−23	19	
14	Sporting de Huelva	21	5	3	13	13	36	−23	18	
15	Valencia	21	3	8	10	21	28	−7	17	~~Relegation to Segunda División~~ (Note: Due to the COVID-19 pandemic in Spain, no teams were relegated.)
16	Espanyol	21	0	5	16	13	46	−33	5	~~Relegation to Segunda División~~

Source: RFEF
Rules for classification: 1) points; 2) head-to-head points; 3) goal difference; 4) number of goals scored
(C) Champions

=== Results ===
Home \ Away	ATH	ATM	BAR	BET	DEP	ESP	GRA	LEV	LOG	MAD	RAY	RSO	SEV	SPH	TAC	VAL
Athletic Club	—		0–3	2–1	0–2	0–0		1–1	3–0	3–0		2–1	0–0			1–0
Atlético de Madrid	2–2	—	0–0		4–1	3–0		4–1	2–0	1–0		3–0	3–0	1–0	2–1	
Barcelona	a	6–1	—	3–0	6–1	a	3–1	5–0	5–0	5–0	3–1		3–0	7–0	9–1	
Betis	2–2	2–2		—	3–4	2–1		0–2		2–0	0–0	1–1	a	1–1		1–0
Deportivo	0–2			3–1	—	3–1	1–1				3–0	3–3	2–1	5–1	3–1	
Espanyol	1–2		0–4	2–2	0–3	—			1–3	1–3		0–1	0–1	0–0		0–3
Granadilla	1–0	0–2		1–0	5–3		—	0–1	1–1	2–2		0–0	1–0	1–3	1–1	2–0
Levante	2–0	0–1			1–0	1–1	6–2	—	1–1		0–1	3–0	3–2		2–1	a
Logroño		0–3	0–6	3–2			1–1	3–4	—	1–1	4–1		1–0	3–0	5–1	1–0
Madrid CFF	4–1	0–1	0–4	1–0	2–2	2–1	1–3	0–4		—					3–4	1–1
Rayo Vallecano	1–4	1–1	1–1	0–2	2–1	2–1	3–1	0–3	3–2		—			1–0	1–1	3–2
Real Sociedad	0–2	1–4		2–0		4–1	1–0	0–0	5–0	5–0	1–1	—				1–0
Sevilla		2–2	0–2	a		4–0	4–0	0–2		1–0	2–2	1–2	—	1–0		4–3
Sporting de Huelva	0–3	0–1	0–1		0–1				1–1	2–0	1–0	0–2	1–0	—	1–3	2–1
Tacón			0–6	1–1	3–4	2–1		0–3	0–1	1–2		3–1	5–1	3–0	—	0–0
Valencia	2–0		0–4	2–2	1–1	1–1	2–0	0–1			0–0	2–2			1–1	—

Updated to match(es) played on 1 March 2020. Source: RFEF
Legend: Blue = home team win; Yellow = draw; Red = away team win.

== Season statistics ==
=== Top goalscorers ===
Rank	Player	Club	Goals
1	(Spain) Jennifer Hermoso	Barcelona	23
2	(Nigeria) Asisat Oshoala	Barcelona	20
3	(Spain) Peke	Deportivo	14
4	(Venezuela) Oriana Altuve	Rayo Vallecano	13
5	(Equatorial Guinea) Jade Boho	Logroño	12
6	(Spain) Nahikari García	Real Sociedad	11
7	(Spain) Alexia Putellas	Barcelona	10
7	(Venezuela) Gaby	Deportivo	10
9	(Spain) Ángela Sosa	Atlético de Madrid	9
9	(Spain) Lucía García	Athletic Club	9

=== Hat-tricks ===
Player	For	Against	Result	Round
(Spain) Jennifer Hermoso	Barcelona	Tacón	9–1 (h)	1
(Zambia) Barbra Banda	Logroño	Tacón	5–1 (h)	3
(Norway) Caroline Graham Hansen	Barcelona	Deportivo	6–1 (h)	10
(Venezuela) Oriana Altuve	Rayo Vallecano	Granadilla	3–1 (h)	12
(Spain) Nahikari García	Real Sociedad	Logroño	5–0 (h)	13
(Spain) Peke	Deportivo	Real Sociedad	3–3 (h)	14
(Nigeria) Asisat Oshoala^{4}	Barcelona	Tacón	6–0 (a)	16
(Spain) Mari Jose	Granadilla	Deportivo	5–3 (h)	18
(Spain) Peke	Deportivo	Real Sociedad	5–1 (h)	21
(Nigeria) Asisat Oshoala	Barcelona	Logroño	6–0 (a)	21

=== Notable attendances ===
- 32,068 Athletic Club v Barcelona at San Mamés (5 January 2020)
- 28,367 Real Sociedad v Athletic Club at Reale Arena (13 October 2019)
