= Samara Ortiz =

Azerbaijani footballer

Personal information
- Full name: Samara Ortiz Cruz
- Date of birth: 16 July 1997 (age 29)
- Place of birth: Madrid, Spain
- Height: 1.59 m (5 ft 3 in)
- Position: Defender

Team information
- Current team: Deportivo La Coruña

Youth career
- 2012–2013: Rayo Vallecano
- 2013–2016: CD Canillas

Senior career*
Years	Team	Apps	(Gls)
2016–2020	CD Tacón	14	(0)
2020–2021	Real Madrid	5	(1)
2021–2022	Brøndby	12	(0)
2022–	Deportivo La Coruña	70	(1)

International career^{‡}
2014–	Azerbaijan U19	8	(0)
- * Club domestic league appearances and goals as of 19:18, 26 July 2025 (UTC) ‡ National team caps and goals as of 21:23, 10 April 2023 (UTC)

Samara Ortiz Cruz (born 16 July 1997) is a footballer who plays as a defender for Deportivo La Coruña. Born in Spain, she is a youth international for Azerbaijan.

== Personal life ==
Ortiz was born in Spain to a Cuban mother and a Spanish father. Her twin sister, Malena, is also a footballer. Outside of football, she studied for a degree in environmental science at the University of Alcalá.

== Club career ==
Ortiz started her career in Rayo Vallecano's academy along with her twin sister. The sisters both ended up playing for CD Canillas and then its successor CD Tacón, a club that would itself progress to become Real Madrid. In the summer of 2021, Samara Ortiz would join Danish club Brøndby meaning that the sisters were separated for the first time. After one season in Denmark, Ortiz opted to move back to Spain and joined Deportivo La Coruña for the 2022–23 season.

== International career ==
Ortiz became a citizen of Azerbaijan in 2014 and, on 13 September, she made her debut for their under-19 team in a match against Ukraine.
