= Beatriz Parra =

Beatriz Parra may refer to:

- Beatriz Parra Durango, Ecuadorian classical soprano
- Bea Parra, Spanish footballer
