= Vera Martínez =

Spanish footballer

Personal information
- Full name: Vera Martínez Viota
- Date of birth: 13 September 1999 (age 27)
- Place of birth: Astillero, Santander, Spain
- Position: Defender

Team information
- Current team: Deportivo La Coruña
- Number: 3

Senior career*
Years	Team	Apps	(Gls)
2013–2015	Reocín Racing		
2015–2017	Ave Fénix Racing		
2017–2018	Racing Féminas		
2018–2022	Alavés	57+	(1+)
2022–2024	Osasuna	57	(3)
2024–	Deportivo La Coruña		
- * Club domestic league appearances and goals as of 1 July 2024

Vera Martínez Viota (Astillero, Santander, 13 September 1999) is a Spanish soccer player who plays as a defender. She began her career with Reocín Racing B, her club of formation, and has stood out for her talent and consistency in Spanish women's football. Throughout her career, she has played for several important teams, including Deportivo Alavés, CA Osasuna and, most recently, Deportivo de La Coruña.

== Club career ==
Reocín Racing B

Vera started her career at SD Reocín Racing B, where she played during the 2013–2014 season.

Reocín Racing First team

In the following season, Vera moved up to the first team of Reocín Racing, continuing her development and contributing to the team.

Ave Fénix Racing de Torrelavega and CDE Racing Féminas

Between 2015 and 2017, Vera played for Ave Fénix Racing de Torrelavega, consolidating as a reliable defender. In 2017, the Ave Fénix team was absorbed by Racing de Santander, forming the CDE Racing Femenas. Vera continued her career in this new team.

Cantabria U-18 Team and Spain U-19 National Team

In 2015, Vera was called up by the Cantabria U-18 team to compete in the preliminary phase of the Spanish Championship. In 2016, she participated in the Spanish Championship held in San Feliú de Llobregat. Additionally, she received call-ups for the Spain U-19 team, participating in three training sessions at the Ciudad del Fútbol de Las Rozas.

Deportivo Alavés

In 2018, Vera Martínez joined Deportivo Alavés, where she stood out as a key player in the team's defense.

In the 2018–2019 season, Deportivo Alavés finished in second place in the Segunda División, earning promotion to the Reto Iberdrola (now 1ª RFEF). On 31 March 2019, Vera Martínez played for the first time at Mendizorroza Stadium, the venue for the men's team, in a historic match as it was the first time the stadium was opened for the women's team. In this game on matchday 24, Alavés drew 2–2 with Athletic Club Bilbao B, with an attendance of 8,375 fans.

In the 2019–2020 season, she participated in the Reto Iberdrola Norte, now known as 1ª RFEF.

In the 2020–2021 season The team achieved promotion to the Primera División (Liga F) for the first time in its history. The promotion was decided on the final matchday, 30 May 2021, when Alavés faced Atlético de Madrid B at the Ciudad Deportiva Wanda Alcalá de Henares. Alavés won the match 0–2, securing their promotion to the Liga Ellas (now LigaF).

In the 2021–2022 season, on 29 September 2021, Vera Martínez made her debut in the Primera División on matchday 4, in the game between Atlético de Madrid and Alavés, held at the Ciudad Deportiva Wanda Alcalá de Henares, with Atlético de Madrid winning 3–2. On 19 December 2021, she played again at Mendizorroza on matchday 14, in a match where Alavés faced Levante UD, ending in a 1–1 draw. In the Copa de la Reina, Alavés made its debut but was defeated 2–0 by Espanyol in the round of 32. During this season, Vera played a total of 13 matches, starting in 7 of them.

CA Osasuna

In 2022, Martínez moved to CA Osasuna, where she played 51 matches (50 as a starter) and scored 3 goals in the 1ª RFEF (Second Division). In the 2022-2023 Copa de la Reina season, Osasuna advanced to the quarter-finals. In the Round of 32, they defeated Sporting de Huelva 2–0. In the Round of 16, although they lost 0–9 to FC Barcelona, the team progressed to the quarter-finals due to a sanction imposed on FC Barcelona for the improper inclusion of player Geyse Ferreira. In the quarter-finals, Osasuna was defeated by Athletic Club with a score of 1–2. In the 2023–2024 season, the team fell just short of promotion to Liga F, losing 3–1 in the playoff final to RC Espanyol. In the Copa de la Reina of the same season, Osasuna did not advance past the Round of 32, being eliminated by Real Betis with a score of 1–2.

RCDeportivo de La Coruña

For the 2024–2025 season, Vera Martínez has signed with Deportivo de La Coruña, a team recently promoted to the Primera División.
