= Bea Parra =

Spanish footballer (born 1987)

Personal information
- Full name: Beatriz Parra Salas
- Date of birth: 31 July 1987 (age 39)
- Place of birth: Badajoz, Spain
- Height: 1.65 m (5 ft 5 in)
- Position: Striker

Team information
- Current team: Huesca

Senior career*
Years	Team	Apps	(Gls)
–2009	Llanos de Olivenza		
2009–2014	Sevilla	70+	(46+)
2014–2021	Betis	124+	(71+)
2021–2023	Atlético San Luis	57	(22)
2023	Tindastóll	9	(2)
2023–2024	Arezzo	7	(0)
2024–	Huesca	0	(0)
- * Club domestic league appearances and goals as of 17 March 2024

Beatriz Parra Salas (born 31 July 1987) is a Spanish footballer who plays as a striker for Segunda Federación club Huesca.

== Career ==
Parra played for Spanish side Betis. After that, she played in Mexico.

== Personal life ==
Parra is in relationship with Marta Perarnau.
