= María Bores =

Spanish footballer (born 1997)

Personal information
- Full name: María Bores Vázquez
- Date of birth: 17 November 1997 (age 28)
- Place of birth: Madrid, Spain
- Height: 1.62 m (5 ft 4 in)
- Position: Defender

Team information
- Current team: Rayo Vallecano
- Number: 22

Senior career*
Years	Team	Apps	(Gls)
2013–2015	Madrid CFF		
2015–2018	Atlético Madrid	8	(0)
2017–2018	→ Sevilla (loan)	23	(0)
2018–2021	Sevilla	51	(0)
2021–	Rayo Vallecano	20	(0)
- * Club domestic league appearances and goals as of 22:40, 22 February 2022 (UTC)

María Bores Vázquez (born 17 November 1997) is a Spanish footballer who plays as a defender for Rayo Vallecano.

== Club career ==
Bores started her career at Madrid CFF.
