= 2007–08 Superliga Femenina =

Sporting competition

Superliga
- Season: 2007–08
- Dates: 8 September 2007 – 20 April 2008
- Champions: Levante
- Relegated: Oviedo Moderno; Híspalis
- UEFA Women's Cup: Levante
- Matches: 182
- Goals: 609 (3.35 per match)

The 2007–08 Superliga Femenina started on 8 September 2007 and ended on 20 April 2008.

Levante achieved their fourth title.

== Teams and locations ==
Team	Location
Athletic Bilbao	Bilbao
Atlético Madrid	Madrid
Colegio Alemán	Valencia
Espanyol	Barcelona
Híspalis	Seville
L'Estartit	Torroella de Montgrí
Levante	Valencia
Oviedo Moderno	Oviedo
Prainsa Zaragoza	Zaragoza
Puebla	Puebla de la Calzada
Rayo Vallecano	Madrid
Real Sociedad	San Sebastián
Sporting Huelva	Huelva
Torrejón	Torrejón de Ardoz

== League table ==
Pos	Team	Pld	W	D	L	GF	GA	GD	Pts	Relegation
1	Levante (C)	26	23	2	1	64	10	+54	71	Qualification to UEFA Women's Cup and Copa de la Reina
2	Rayo Vallecano	26	23	2	1	82	23	+59	71	Qualification to Copa de la Reina
3	Athletic Bilbao	26	17	2	7	72	31	+41	53	Qualification to Copa de la Reina
4	Espanyol	26	17	1	8	62	40	+22	52	Qualification to Copa de la Reina
5	Torrejón	26	11	4	11	44	42	+2	37	Qualification to Copa de la Reina
6	Puebla	26	10	6	10	42	37	+5	36	Qualification to Copa de la Reina
7	Atlético Madrid	26	11	3	12	36	42	−6	36	Qualification to Copa de la Reina
8	Prainsa Zaragoza	26	10	5	11	40	47	−7	35	Qualification to Copa de la Reina
9	L'Estartit	26	10	4	12	39	46	−7	34	
10	Real Sociedad	26	7	5	14	22	47	−25	26	
11	Sporting Huelva	26	6	5	15	27	43	−16	23	
12	Colegio Alemán	26	6	4	16	36	59	−23	22	
13	Oviedo Moderno (R)	26	4	2	20	20	68	−48	14	Relegation to Liga Nacional
14	Híspalis (R)	26	4	1	21	23	74	−51	13	Relegation to Liga Nacional

Source: Arquero Arba
Rules for classification: 1) Points; 2) Head-to-head points; 3) Head-to-head goal difference; 4) Goal difference; 5) Goals scored.
(C) Champions; (R) Relegated

== Results ==
Home \ Away	ATH	ATM	CAL	ESP	HIS	EST	LEV	OVI	ZAR	PUE	RAY	RSO	SPH	TOR
Athletic Bilbao	—	3–2	5–1	2–0	7–0	5–0	2–2	7–0	2–1	2–1	2–4	7–0	3–0	2–0
Atlético Madrid	1–0	—	0–2	1–2	1–0	4–5	0–2	2–2	3–2	0–2	0–1	1–1	3–0	2–1
Colegio Alemán	1–2	1–2	—	2–0	2–0	1–0	0–3	1–0	2–2	2–3	2–5	1–2	1–2	1–3
Espanyol	3–1	0–1	2–0	—	2–0	4–1	0–5	6–0	6–3	2–1	3–3	5–0	3–1	3–1
Híspalis	1–4	3–2	1–2	2–3	—	1–2	1–5	2–1	1–2	0–3	0–4	1–0	1–1	3–1
L'Estartit	0–3	2–2	2–2	3–2	3–0	—	0–2	3–1	1–3	2–0	1–2	1–1	0–0	2–1
Levante	3–1	2–0	3–1	1–2	4–0	2–0	—	5–0	4–2	4–0	1–0	1–0	1–0	5–0
Oviedo Moderno	1–3	1–0	3–2	1–3	3–2	2–2	0–2	—	0–1	0–3	0–3	0–2	2–1	0–5
Prainsa Zaragoza	0–4	1–0	3–3	2–4	4–2	0–4	1–2	2–0	—	1–0	0–2	2–2	1–0	2–1
Puebla	2–2	1–2	4–2	2–1	6–0	2–0	0–1	1–0	0–0	—	1–2	1–1	3–0	1–4
Rayo Vallecano	2–1	5–1	5–1	3–2	7–0	3–1	0–0	2–1	1–0	6–2	—	4–1	4–0	4–1
Real Sociedad	0–1	1–2	1–0	0–2	1–0	2–1	0–2	2–0	0–4	1–1	2–3	—	0–2	0–2
Sporting Huelva	3–1	2–3	5–2	0–1	2–1	0–2	0–1	3–0	1–1	1–1	0–2	1–1	—	1–2
Torrejón	3–0	0–1	1–1	4–1	2–1	1–1	0–1	2–2	2–0	1–1	0–5	3–1	3–1	—

Source: Arquero Arba
Legend: Blue = home team win; Yellow = draw; Red = away team win.

== Top scorer ==
List of Spanish Superliga 2007/08

#	Player	Tema	Goals
1	Natalia Pablos	Rayo Vallecano	24
2	Erika Vázquez	Athletic Club	21
3	Sonia Bermúdez	Rayo Vallecano	20
4	Laura del Río	Levante UD	16
	Marta Cubí	RCD Espanyol	
6	Maribel Domínguez	UE L'Estartit	15
