= Inês Pereira =

Portuguese footballer (born 1999)

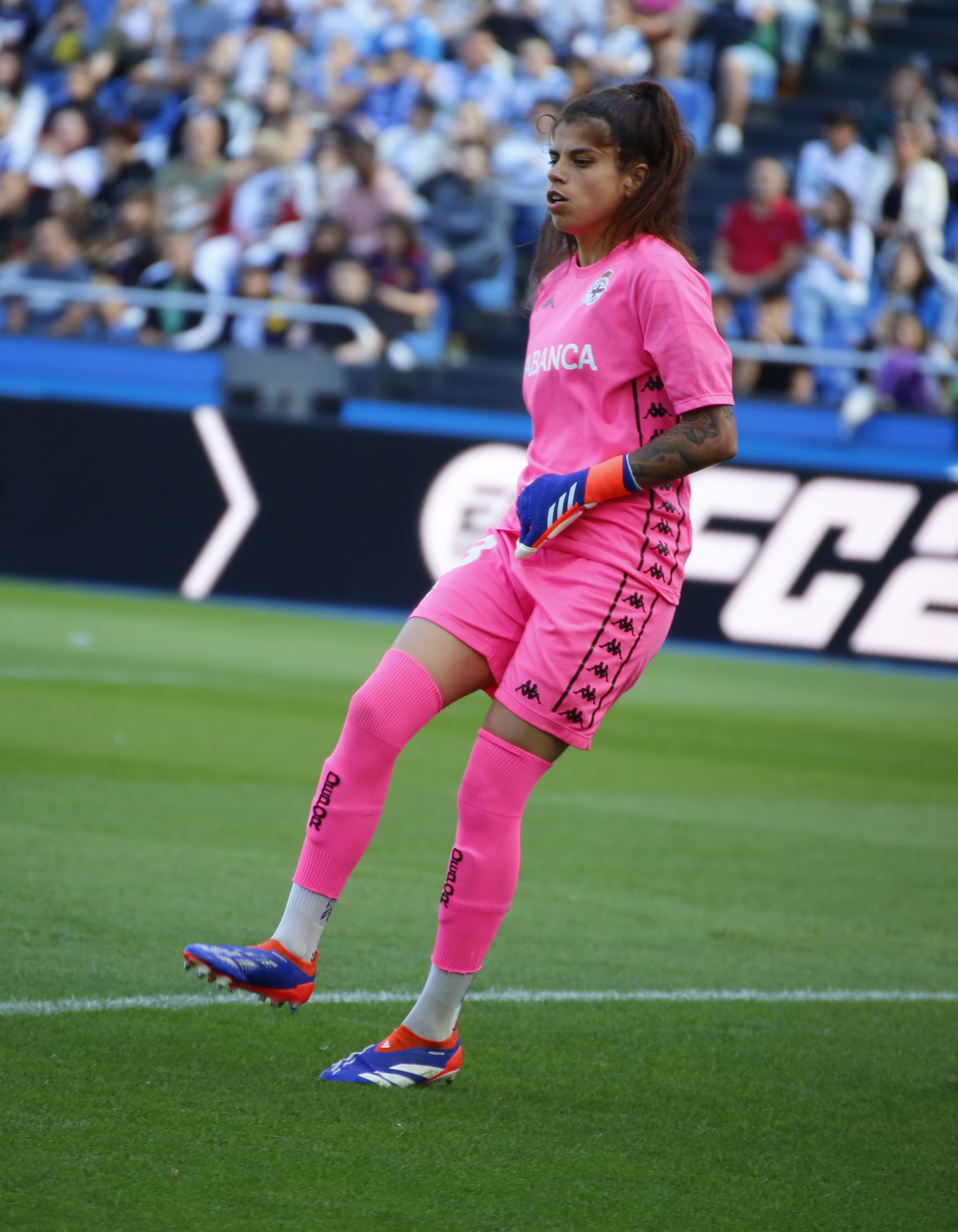
- Pereira in 2024

Personal information
- Full name: Inês Teixeira Pereira
- Date of birth: 26 May 1999 (age 27)
- Place of birth: Lisbon, Portugal
- Height: 1.68 m (5 ft 6 in)
- Position: Goalkeeper

Team information
- Current team: Deportivo de A Coruña

Youth career
- 2006–2012: AC Cacém
- 2002–2013: 1º Dezembro
- 2013–2014: CAC

Senior career*
| Years | Team | Apps | (Gls) |
| 2014–2016 | G.D. Estoril Praia | | |
| 2016–2021 | Sporting CP | 40 | (0) |
| 2021–2024 | Servette | 30 | (0) |
| 2024–2026 | Everton | 0 | (0) |
| 2024–2026 | → Deportivo de A Coruña (loan) | 28 | (0) |
| 2026– | Deportivo de A Coruña | 0 | (0) |

International career^{‡}
| 2015 | Portugal U16 | 2 | (0) |
| 2015 | Portugal U17 | 5 | (0) |
| 2016–2017 | Portugal U19 | 15 | (0) |
| 2018– | Portugal | 47 | (0) |
- * Club domestic league appearances and goals as of 10 June 2025 ‡ National team caps and goals as of 10 June 2025

Inês Teixeira Pereira (European Portuguese: [iˈneʃ tɐjˈʃɐj.ɾɐ pɨˈɾɐj.ɾɐ]; born 26 May 1999) is a Portuguese footballer who plays as a goalkeeper for Liga F side Deportivo de A Coruña and the Portugal women's national team.

== Club career ==
After starting her career in the Campeonato Nacional Feminino with G.D. Estoril Praia, Pereira returned to her home city of Lisbon with Sporting CP where she signed in the summer of 2016.

At the end of each of her first two seasons at the club, Sporting were crowned champions and Pereira became a regular in the first team with the team winning 36 of her 40 starts during her five seasons at the club. When the team failed to secure Champions League football at the end of the 2020–21 season, Pereira chose to sign for Swiss champions Servette where she instantly became the number one goalkeeper and kept back-to-back clean sheets in the club's first two qualification fixtures of the Champions League campaign.

On 19 July 2024, it was announced that Pereira had joined Everton, being sent immediately out on loan to Deportivo de A Coruña. On 25 June 2025, she was sent on another loan spell to Deportivo. In August 2026, Pereira joined the club on a permanent basis.

== International career ==
Pereira has been capped for the Portugal national team, appearing for the team during the 2019 FIFA Women's World Cup qualifying cycle. Pereira also started and kept a clean sheet for Portugal in the decisive qualification game for UEFA Women's Euro 2022; however, her team were eliminated 1–0 on aggregate and initially failed to qualify for the tournament before eventually taking the place from Russia who were removed and banned from FIFA and UEFA International matches after Russia's invasion of Ukraine.

On 30 May 2023, she was included in the 23-player squad for the FIFA Women's World Cup 2023.

On 24 June 2025, Pereira was called up to the Portugal squad for the UEFA Women's Euro 2025.

== Honours ==
Sporting

- Campeonato Nacional Feminino: 2016–17, 2017–18
