= Paula Andújar =

Spanish footballer (born 1993)

Personal information
- Full name: Paula Andújar Jiménez
- Date of birth: 22 July 1993 (age 33)
- Place of birth: Madrid, Spain
- Height: 1.80 m (5 ft 11 in)
- Position: Defender

Team information
- Current team: Granada
- Number: 2

Senior career*
Years	Team	Apps	(Gls)
2009–2011	Torrejón B		
2010–2013	Torrejón	13+	
2013–2014	Rayo Vallecano B		
2014–2015	Carson–Newman Eagles		
2015–2022	Rayo Vallecano	139	(7)
2022–2023	Dux Logroño	7	(0)
2023–	Granada	2	(0)
- * Club domestic league appearances and goals as of 16:59, 24 November 2024 (UTC)

Paula Andújar Jiménez (born 22 July 1993) is a Spanish footballer who plays as a defender for Granada.

== Club career ==
Andújar started her career at Torrejón B.
