= Claudia Cabezas =

Spanish footballer (born 2001)

Personal information
- Full name: Claudia María Cabezas Damasiewicz
- Date of birth: 8 May 2001 (age 25)
- Place of birth: Spain
- Position: Midfielder

Team information
- Current team: Rayo Vallecano
- Number: 27

Youth career
- Rayo Vallecano

Senior career*
Years	Team	Apps	(Gls)
2021–	Rayo Vallecano	13	(0)
- * Club domestic league appearances and goals as of 1 October 2022

Claudia María Cabezas Damasiewicz (born 8 May 2001) is a Spanish footballer who plays as a midfielder for Primera División club Rayo Vallecano.

== Club career ==
Cabezas made her senior debut for Rayo Vallecano on 4 September 2021 as an 88th-minute substitution in a 0–5 Primera División away loss to Atlético Madrid.

== Personal life ==
Born in Spain, Cabezas is also of Polish descent.
