= Patri Hidalgo =

Spanish footballer (born 1998)

Personal information
- Full name: Patricia Hidalgo Candelo
- Date of birth: 8 December 1998 (age 27)
- Place of birth: Villanueva de la Serena, Spain
- Position: Midfielder

Team information
- Current team: Rayo Vallecano
- Number: 12

Senior career*
Years	Team	Apps	(Gls)
2015–2017	La Cruz Villanovense		
2017–2018	Atlético Madrid C		
2018–2020	Rayo Vallecano B		
2019–	Rayo Vallecano	31	(0)
- * Club domestic league appearances and goals as of 12:21, 28 November 2021 (UTC)

Patricia Hidalgo Candelo (born 8 December 1998) is a Spanish footballer who plays as a midfielder for Rayo Vallecano.

== Club career ==
Hidalgo started her career at La Cruz Villanovense.
