= Deportivo de A Coruña (women) =

- Full name: Real Club Deportivo de A Coruña, S.A.D.
- Nicknames: Dépor; Herculinas; As Nosas; Blanquiazules
- Founded: 2016; 10 years ago
- Stadium: Cidade Deportiva de Abegondo
- Capacity: 1,000
- President: Álvaro García Diéguez
- Head coach: Fran Alonso
- League: Liga F
- 2025–26: Liga F, 12th of 16
- Website: rcdeportivo.es
Home colours	Away colours

Real Club Deportivo de A Coruña Femenino, known as Deportivo ABANCA for sponsorship reasons, is the women's football section of Deportivo de A Coruña, club based in the city of A Coruña, Galicia, that currently plays in Liga F, the top tier of Spanish women's football.

== History ==
=== Karbo Deportivo (1983–1988) ===
Logo of former Karbo CF before becoming Karbo Deportivo

Deportivo entered in the women's football in the winter of 1983–84 after absorbing Karbo C.F. and changing its name to Karbo Deportivo completely integrated into the structure of Deportivo de A Coruña, also using the colors and shield of Deportivo. The original club was named for its founders, Ramón Carrasco and Mari Carmen Borrego. The team won the first official women's football competitions in Spain (the current Copa de la Reina, called Spanish Championship before the foundation of the women's football league) until 1985.

The section was dissolved in 1988 due to the economic problems that the R.C. Deportivo, plunged into a suffocating debt and with the men's team on the verge of relegation to Segunda División B, as well as an increase in expenses for the increasing professionalization of women's football, a year before Superliga was created.

=== 2016–present: recovery of the women's section ===
On 16 March 2016, Deportivo announced the recovery of the women's club section. The new club started playing its first season in Segunda División, after an agreement with local team Orzán SD Deportivo to occupy his place forming a stronger Galician team, and in its debut as Deportivo Femenino ended as runner-up of the Group 1. In the 2017–18 season the team was renamed Deportivo ABANCA after an agreement with the bank for 4 years.

After three years, on 19 May 2019, Deportivo achieved promotion to Primera División for the first time ever.

Their first season in the Primera División was cut short on 8 May 2020, due to the RFEF choosing to suspend non-professional football during the COVID-19 pandemic. With this cancellation, they finished the season with an unprecedented fourth place. In the 2021–22 season, Depor finished 15th was relegated to the Segunda División Pro.

== Season by season ==
=== Karbo CF ===
Season	Div	Pos	Pld	W	D	L	GF	GA	Pts	Copa de la Reina	Manager
1982–83	Galician League	1st	10	9	1	0	65	4	19	Champions	José Mañana
1983–84	Galician League	1st	14							Champions	José Mañana
1984–85	Galician League	1st	10	10	0	0	82	0	20	Champions	Antonio "Quinocho"
1985–86	Galician League	1st	9	8	0	1			16	Semifinals	Antonio "Quinocho"
1986–87	Galician League	1st	8							Semifinals	Antonio "Quinocho"

=== Deportivo La Coruña ===
Season	Div	Pos	Pld	W	D	L	GF	GA	Pts	Copa de la Reina	Manager
2016–17	2ª (group 1)	2nd	26	21	2	3	120	19	65	no entry	Manu Sánchez
2017–18	2ª (group 1)	2nd	26	24	1	1	155	11	73	no entry	Manu Sánchez
2018–19	2ª (group 1)	1st	26	25	1	0	150	13	76	no entry	Manu Sánchez
2019–20	1ª	4th	21	11	4	6	46	38	37	Quarterfinals	Manu Sánchez
2020–21	1ª	15th	34	8	5	21	39	81	29	no entry	Manu Sánchez
2021–22	2ª (group 1)	6th	30	15	6	9	49	29	51	Second round	Miguel Llorente
2022–23	2ª	3rd	30	15	8	7	52	29	53	Second round	Irene Ferreras
2023–24	2ª	2nd	26	16	8	2	43	23	56	First round	Irene Ferreras
2024–25	1ª	14th	30	6	9	15	27	48	27	Round of 16	Fran Alonso
2025–26	1ª	12th	30	8	7	15	34	54	31	Round of 16	Fran Alonso

== Honours ==
=== Karbo CF ===
Domestic

- Copa de la Reina (3): 1983, 1984, 1985
- Copa de la Reina (unofficial editions) (2): 1981, 1982

Regional

- Copa Galicia (1): 1987
- Galician League (5): 1982–83, 1983–84, 1984–85, 1985–86, 1986–87

=== Deportivo La Coruña ===
Domestic

- Second division (1): 2018–2019

Regional

- Copa Galicia (2): 2018, 2019
- Copa Deputación (4): 2016, 2017, 2018, 2019

Friendly

- Teresa Herrera Trophy (2): 2016, 2020

== Players ==
=== Current squad ===
As of 2 July 2026
Note: Flags indicate national team as defined under FIFA eligibility rules; some limited exceptions apply. Players may hold more than one non-FIFA nationality.

No.	Pos.	Nation	Player
1	GK	ESP	Yohana Gómez
3	DF	ESP	Vera Martínez
6	MF	ESP	Eva Alonso
7	MF	ESP	Eva Dios
8	MF	ESP	Olaya Rodríguez
9	FW	URU	Esperanza Pizarro
10	FW	BRA	Millene Cabral Vieira
11	FW	ESP	Paula Monteagudo
13	GK	POR	Ines Pereira
14	FW	ESP	Ainhoa Marín
15	DF	ARG	Sofía Domínguez

No.	Pos.	Nation	Player
16	FW	ESP	Marisa
17	DF	ESP	Vega Montesinos
18	MF	VEN	Michi Apóstol
19	FW	ESP	Bárbara Latorre
20	DF	ESP	Elena Vázquez
23	DF	GER	Merle Barth
24	MF	RSA	Hildah Magaia
26	DF	ESP	Paula Novo
28	MF	ESP	Redru
31	MF	ESP	Lucía Rivas
—	FW	ESP	Lucía Pardo

=== Reserve team ===
Note: Flags indicate national team as defined under FIFA eligibility rules; some limited exceptions apply. Players may hold more than one non-FIFA nationality.

No.	Pos.	Nation	Player
27	MF	ESP	Carmen Carballada
34	MF	ESP	Sara Barreda
35	GK	ESP	Martina Rivas
36	MF	ESP	Sonsoles Martín
37	GK	ESP	Antía Veiga
