= Marta Perarnau =

Footballer (born 1995)

Personal information
- Full name: Marta Perarnau Vives
- Date of birth: 20 April 1995 (age 31)
- Place of birth: Manresa, Spain
- Height: 1.65 m (5 ft 5 in)
- Position: Right back

Team information
- Current team: Tindastóll

Youth career
- Rayo Vallecano

Senior career*
Years	Team	Apps	(Gls)
2017–2019	Rayo Vallecano	51	(0)
2019–2021	Betis	11	(0)
2021–2023	Atlético San Luis	54	(0)
2023–	Tindastóll		

International career^{‡}
2013	Azerbaijan U19	3	(1)
- * Club domestic league appearances and goals ‡ National team caps and goals as of 26 September 2022

Marta Perarnau Vives (born 20 April 1995) is a footballer who plays as a right back for Tindastóll. Born in Spain, she was an Azerbaijan youth international.

== Career ==
Perarnau started her career with Spanish side Rayo Vallecano. In 2021, she signed for Atlético San Luis in Mexico.

== Personal life ==
Perarnau is the daughter of Spanish journalist Martí Perarnau and Spanish runner, journalist, and trainer Loles Vives. She is in relationship with Bea Parra.
