= Yipsy Ojeda =

Chilean footballer (born 1991)

Personal information
- Full name: Yipsy Yanara Ojeda Menares
- Date of birth: 16 May 1991 (age 35)
- Place of birth: Santiago, Chile
- Position: Midfielder

Team information
- Current team: Femarguín
- Number: 8

Youth career
- 2003–2004: Universidad de Chile
- 2008–2009: Colo-Colo

Senior career*
Years	Team	Apps	(Gls)
2010–2014	Colo-Colo		
2015–2016	Santiago Morning		
2016–2017	Universidad de Chile		
2018	Cúcuta Deportivo		
2018–2019	Universidad de Chile		
2019	3B da Amazônia	7	(4)
2019–2021	CFF Cáceres		
2021	Santa Teresa		
2022	Parquesol	3	(0)
2022–	Femarguín		

International career
2008	Chile U17		
- Chile U20
2017	Chile (futsal)		

Managerial career
- 2025–: Femarguín B
- * Club domestic league appearances and goals

Yipsy Yanara Ojeda Menares (born 16 May, 1991) is a Chilean footballer who plays as a midfielder for Spanish side CD Femarguín.

== Club career ==
Born in Santiago, Chile, Ojeda began her career with Universidad de Chile. In 2008, she joined Colo-Colo and played for them until 2014, winning nine league titles and the 2012 Copa Libertadores Femenina, which consequently led the team in the 2013 International Club Championship. She was the first ever team captain in the club history.

After stints with Santiago Morning (2015) and Universidad de Chile (2016–17), she moved to Colombia and played for Cúcuta Deportivo.

She returned to Universidad de Chile, performing as the team captain, before moving abroad again and signing with Brazilian side 3B da Amazônia in March 2019.

In the same year, she moved to Europe. In Spain, she has played for CFF Cáceres, coinciding with her compatriot Bárbara Santibáñez, Santa Teresa, CD Parquesol and CD Femarguín.

In July 2023, she renewed her contract with CD Femarguín.

== International career ==
In 2008, Ojeda represented Chile U17 in the South American Championship. She also has represented the under-20 team.

In 2017 and 2018, she was short-listed in the senior team for the Copa América.

In November 2017, she represented the Chile futsal team in the Copa América in Uruguay.

== Managerial career ==
Ojeda has worked as football coach. At the same time she has played for Femarguín, she has coached the B-team.

In February 2026, Ojeda assumed as sporting director of the Femarguín youth system.

== Personal life ==
She graduated as both a physiotherapist at Duoc UC and Job safety analyst.
