= Stefanía Maggiolini =

Uruguayan football player and manager (born 1986)

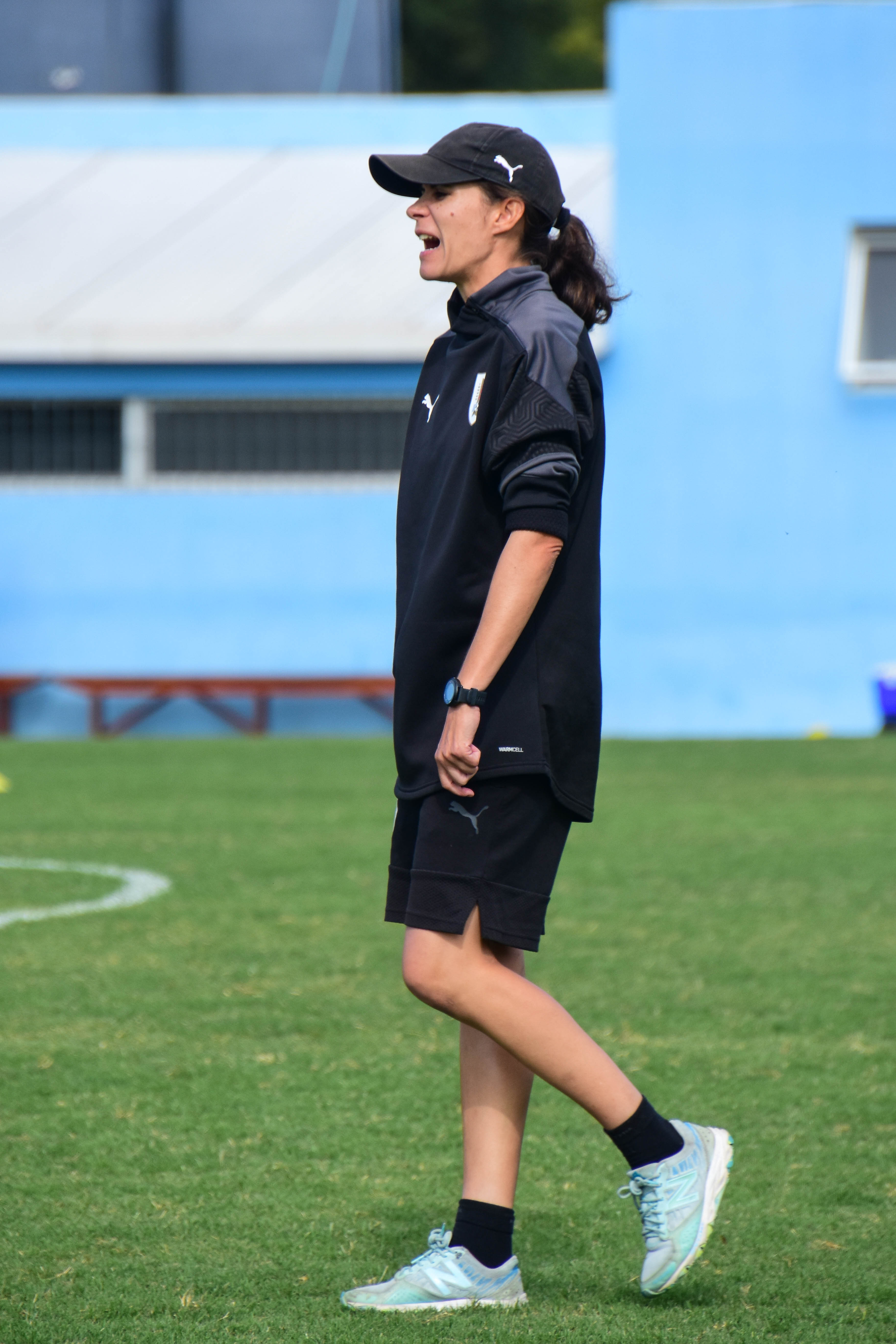

Personal information
- Full name: Stefanía Teresa Maggiolini Fort
- Date of birth: 15 October 1986 (age 40)
- Place of birth: Montevideo, Uruguay
- Height: 1.73 m (5 ft 8 in)
- Position: Midfielder

Team information
- Current team: Defensor Sporting U-19 (women) (manager)

Senior career*
Years	Team	Apps	(Gls)
2000–2005	Nacional		
2005–2006	Rampla Juniors		
2006–2007	River Plate		
2007–2012	L'Estartit	128	(9)
2013	Llanos de Olivenza	11	(0)
2018	Club Náutico	15	(1)

International career^{‡}
2004	Uruguay U19	0+	(0)
2006	Uruguay U20	1+	(1)
2003–2006	Uruguay	9	(0)

Managerial career
- 2018: Peñarol U-16 (women)
- 2019–: Defensor Sporting U-19 (women)
- * Club domestic league appearances and goals ‡ National team caps and goals as of 26 November 2006

Stefanía Teresa Maggiolini Fort (born 15 October 1986) is a Uruguayan football manager and former player, who played as a defensive midfielder. She has been a member of the Uruguay women's national team. She currently manages the women's under-19 team of Defensor Sporting.

Maggiolini previously played for Club Nacional, Rampla Juniors and CA River Plate in Montevideo and UE L'Estartit in Spain.

As a member of the Uruguay national team, she played 20 games in U19, U20, First team and 2007 Pan American Games.

== Club career ==
Born in Montevideo, Uruguay, Maggiolini started her career with Club Nacional de Football. In 2003, she was the top scorer making 17 goals in the first division with only 14 years.

== International career ==
Maggiolini represented Uruguay at the 2004 South American U-19 Women's Championship and the 2006 South American U-20 Women's Championship. At senior level, she played two Copa América Femenina editions (2003, 2006 and 2010) and the 2007 Pan American Games.
