= Iris Ponciano =

Spanish footballer (born 1995)

Personal information
- Full name: Iris Ponciano del Río
- Date of birth: 22 June 1995 (age 31)
- Place of birth: Madrid, Spain
- Height: 1.59 m (5 ft 3 in)
- Position: Forward

Team information
- Current team: Rayo Vallecano
- Number: 7

Senior career*
| Years | Team | Apps | (Gls) |
| 2013–2015 | Rayo Vallecano B | | |
| 2014– | Rayo Vallecano | 154 | (10) |
- * Club domestic league appearances and goals as of 1 October 2022

Iris Ponciano del Río (born 22 June 1995) is a Spanish footballer who plays as a forward for Rayo Vallecano.

== Club career ==
Ponciano started her career at Rayo Vallecano B.
