= Vânia (footballer) =

Brazilian footballer (born 1980)

Personal information
- Full name: Vânia Cristina Martins
- Date of birth: 9 November 1980 (age 45)
- Place of birth: Embu das Artes, São Paulo, Brazil
- Height: 1.63 m (5 ft 4 in)
- Positions: Forward; full back

Youth career
- 1997: Corinthians

Senior career*
Years	Team	Apps	(Gls)
1997	Santos		
1998	Portuguesa		
1999–2001	São Paulo		
2001–2004	UniSant'Anna		
2005	Salto		
2006	São Caetano		
2006–2007	Levante		
2007	Jaguariúna		
2007	America-RJ	7	(2)
2008	Sagrada Cena		
2008	Palmeiras/CEUNSP		
2008–2009	CF Femenino Cáceres		
2009	Corinthians		
2009–2010	CF Femenino Cáceres		
2010	São Caetano		
2011	Hyundai Steel Red Angels		
2012	XV de Piracicaba		
2012	São Caetano		
2013	Llanos de Olivenza		
2013	Centro Olímpico		
2014–2017	Santa Teresa		
2018–2019	Badajoz	12	(9)

International career
2010	Brazil	1	(0)
2011	Equatorial Guinea B	1	(0)
2011–2016	Equatorial Guinea	3	(0)
- * Club domestic league appearances and goals as of 11 May 2019

Vânia Cristina Martins (born 9 November 1980), simply known as Vânia, is a Brazilian former footballer who played as a forward and full back. She was a member of the Brazil women's national team.

== Career ==
Vânia played for several Brazilian teams, of which highlights Portuguesa, São Paulo and Corinthians.

== International career ==
Vânia represented Brazil at senior level in the 2010 International Tournament City of São Paulo, playing a match against Netherlands.

=== Controversy ===
From 2011 to 2016, Vânia made appearances for the Equatorial Guinea women's national team despite having no connection with the African nation. She attended the 2011 FIFA Women's World Cup and was champion of the 2012 African Women's Championship. She also played the 2015 CAF Women's Olympic Qualifying Tournament and ultimately the 2016 Africa Women Cup of Nations Qualifying. On 5 October 2017, she and other nine Brazilian footballers were declared by FIFA as ineligible to play for Equatorial Guinea.
