= Malena Ortiz =

Spanish footballer

Personal information
- Full name: Malena Ortiz Cruz
- Date of birth: 16 July 1997 (age 29)
- Place of birth: Madrid, Spain
- Height: 1.59 m (5 ft 3 in)
- Position: Midfielder

Team information
- Current team: Servette
- Number: 10

Youth career
- 2012–2013: Rayo Vallecano
- 2013–2016: CD Canillas

Senior career*
Years	Team	Apps	(Gls)
2016–2020	CD Tacón	19	(1)
2020–2022	Real Madrid	2	(0)
2022–2024	Servette	19	(6)

International career^{‡}
2014–2016	Azerbaijan U19	9	(0)
- * Club domestic league appearances and goals as of 11:00, 10 April 2023 (UTC) ‡ National team caps and goals as of 12:09, 10 April 2023 (UTC)

Malena Ortiz Cruz (born 16 July 1997) is a footballer who plays as a midfielder for Servette. Born in Spain, she represented Azerbaijan at youth international level.

== Personal life ==
Ortiz was born in Spain to a Cuban mother and a Spanish father. Her twin sister, Samara, is also a footballer.

Outside of football, she studied for a degree in Nutrition and Food Technology at Universidad Católica San Antonio de Murcia. In 2021, she sent a number of football boots to Cuba to help support the development of football in the country.

== Club career ==
Ortiz started her career in Rayo Vallecano's academy along with her twin sister. The sisters both ended up playing for CD Canillas and then its successor CD Tacón, a club that would itself progress to become Real Madrid. At CD Tacón, Malena Ortiz became captain but, shortly after the Real Madrid rebranding, in April 2021, Ortiz suffered an anterior cruciate ligament injury in her left knee. That summer, Samara Ortiz would join Brøndby, meaning that the sisters were separated for the first time.

In January 2022, she signed for Swiss club Servette, joining six other Spanish players in their squad. This departure came only seven months after renewing her contract with Real Madrid and having only played 16 minutes for the club. At Servette, she recovered from the injury that had disrupted her career at Real Madrid.

== International career ==
Having become a citizen of Azerbaijan in 2014, on 13 September of the same year Ortiz made her debut for their under-19 national team in a match against Ukraine.
