= AD Sagrada Cena =

Spanish football club

Sagrada Cena
- Full name: Asociación Deportiva Sagrada Cena
- Founded: 1999
- Dissolved: 2010
- Ground: Pinilla, Cáceres, Extremadura, Spain
- Capacity: 1,000
- 2009–10: Regional Preferente, 13th
Home colours	Away colours

Asociación Deportiva Sagrada Cena was a Spanish football club based in Cáceres, in the autonomous community of Extremadura. Sagrada Cena, formed in 1999, it was mainly a football academy rather than a professional club.

The club was disbanded in August 2010, due to limited budget available and the removal of public grants.

== Season to season ==
Season	Tier	Division	Place	Copa del Rey
2005–06	6	1ª Reg.	5th	
2006–07	6	1ª Reg.	11th	
2007–08	6	1ª Reg.	2nd	
2008–09	5	Reg. Pref.	10th	
2009–10	5	Reg. Pref.	13th	
