= Mónica Gonçalves =

Portuguese footballer

Personal information
- Full name: Mónica Filipa Grilo Gonçalves
- Date of birth: 23 April 1988 (age 38)
- Place of birth: Setubal, Portugal
- Position: Midfielder

Senior career*
Years	Team	Apps	(Gls)
–2009	Olivelas		
2009–2010	Sporting Huelva	20	(3)
2010–2011	1º Dezembro		
2011–2012	L'Estartit	14	(3)

International career^{‡}
	Portugal	15	(0)
- * Club domestic league appearances and goals as of 10:21, 22 December 2020 (UTC) ‡ National team caps and goals as of 10:21, 22 December 2020 (UTC)

Mónica Filipa Grilo Gonçalves (born 23 April 1988) is a Portuguese footballer who plays as a striker for UE L'Estartit in the Spanish First Division. She has also played for Odivelas FC, SU 1º de Dezembro (Portugal) and Sporting Huelva (Spain).

She is a member of the Portuguese national team.
