= Daniela Tjeder =

Finnish footballer (born 1985)

Personal information
- Date of birth: 12 June 1985 (age 41)
- Place of birth: Helsinki, Finland
- Position: Forward

International career
Years	Team	Apps	(Gls)
2005	Finland	6	(0)

Daniela Tjeder (born 20 June 1985) is a Finnish international footballer who plays as a Forward who played for Levante UD. Tjeder had previously played for HJK.

== International career ==
Tjeder has represented the senior Finland women's national women team six times and represented Finland playing futsal.

== Honours ==
HJK

- 1 Finnish League:2005
- 3 Finnish Cups:2006, 2007, 2008
