= Lydia Miraoui =

Algerian footballer (born 1991)

Lydia Miraoui ليديا ميراوي (Arabic)
Personal information
- Full name: Lydia Mounia Miraoui
- Date of birth: 24 September 1991 (age 35)
- Place of birth: Maubeuge, France
- Position: Midfielder

Team information
- Current team: ASE Alger Centre

Youth career
- 1999–2004: FCE Arlac
- 2004–2008: Olympique Lyon

Senior career*
Years	Team	Apps	(Gls)
2006–2009	Olympique Lyon B	44	(17)
2008–2010	Olympique Lyon	3	(0)
2010–2011	L'Estartit		
2011–2012	Freiburg	13	(1)
2012–2013	ASE Alger Centre		
2014–2015	Claix Football	12	(1)
2015–	FCE Mérignac Arlac		

International career
- Algeria
- * Club domestic league appearances and goals

Lydia Mounia Miraoui (Arabic: ليديا مونيا ميراوي; born 24 September 1991) is a footballer who plays as a midfielder. Born in France, she represents Algeria at international level.

== Career ==
=== At club level ===
Miraoui started her career in the age of 8 by Football Club des Ecureuils d'Arlac and joined five year later 2004 in the age of 13, to Olympique Lyon. In Lyon She was called 2006 in OL's Reserve team of the Feminin Honneur Ligue – Phase Unique Reserve team squad. Miraoui won with the club 2006/2007 the league was promoted with Lyon's reserve team to the Division 2 Féminine. Miraoui made her professional debut for Olympique Lyonnais Féminin in the Division 1 Féminine on 24 May 2009 in 14:1 win over Stade Saint Brieuc, after sub in minute 58 for Simone Gomes Jatobá. She made 3 appearances in two years for the Senior side of Lyon and was than transferred to Spanish side UE L'Estartit. In summer 2011 Miraoui signed for SC Freiburg in Germany's Frauen Bundesliga, for Olympique Lyon and played 13 games for them in the 2011/2012 season. After the Season left Europe and signed for Algerian Women's Championship for ASE Alger Centre, before returned in summer 2014 to France to sign with Claix Football. Than signed in Summer 2015 for AS Nancy and a year later returned to Merignac, who signed for FCE Mérignac Arlac.

=== International ===
The midfielder is an Algerian international, she took part in the 2010 African Championship and 2014 African Women's Championship in Namibia.
