= UE L'Estartit =

Spanish football club

- Full name: Unió Esportiva L'Estartit Costa Brava
- Founded: 1983 (club); 1992 (women's team)
- Ground: Estadi Municipal de L'Estartit, Torroella de Montgrí, Girona, Catalonia, Spain
- Chairman: (Spain) Carles Nugué Blay
- Manager: (Spain) Rafel Gil
- League: Segunda División
- 2013-14: Segunda División, Group 3, 3rd
Home colours

Unió Esportiva L'Estartit Costa Brava is a Catalan Spanish women's football club from L'Estartit, Girona.

== History ==
Founded in 1992 as the women football section of an homonym football club, it became an independent club following its disappearance. In 2007 the team was promoted to the Superliga by beating SD Reocín and CD Rayco in the promotion play-offs. In its debut season L'Estartit ended in the ninth position, just one point short from qualifying for the Copa de la Reina. In 2010 it qualified for the cup, where it was defeated in the first round by Levante UD.

In 2012 L'Estartit ended fourth to last and was relegated after five years in top flight. The team was weakened and barely avoided another relegation in 2013. It returned to its previous form in 2014, narrowly missing a spot in the promotion playoffs.

In 2017, just after the relegation of the club to the Regional Catalan leagues, L'Estartit agreed collaboration terms with men's club UE Llagostera.

== Season to season ==
=== Men's ===
Season	Tier	Division	Place	Copa del Rey
1983–84	9	Prov. Afic.	7th	
1984–85	8	3ª Reg.	5th	
1985–86	8	3ª Reg.	5th	
1986–87	8	3ª Reg.	12th	
1987–88	8	3ª Reg.	5th	
1988–89	8	3ª Reg.	3rd	
1989–90	8	3ª Reg.	1st	
1990–91	7	2ª Reg.	2nd	
1991–92	7	1ª Terr.	12th	
1992–93	7	1ª Terr.	9th	
1993–94	7	1ª Terr.	13th	

Season	Tier	Division	Place	Copa del Rey
1994–95	7	1ª Terr.	18th	
1995–96	8	2ª Terr.	15th	
1996–97	8	2ª Terr.	5th	
1997–98	8	2ª Terr.	2nd	
1998–99	8	2ª Terr.	8th	
1999–2000	8	2ª Terr.	1st	
2000–01	7	1ª Terr.	3rd	
2001–02	7	1ª Terr.	15th	
2002–03	8	2ª Terr.	19th	
2003–04	9	3ª Terr.	6th	
2004–05	9	3ª Terr.	7th	

=== Women's ===
Season	Division	Place	Copa de la Reina
1997–98	1ª	6th	
1998–99	1ª	4th	
1999–00	1ª	3rd	Quarterfinals
2000–01	1ª	3rd	
2001–02	2ª	4th	
2002–03	2ª	11th	
2003–04	2ª	8th	
2004–05	2ª	1st	
2005–06	2ª	1st	
2006–07	2ª	1st	
2007–08	1ª	9th	
2008–09	1ª	12th	
2009–10	1ª	9th	First round
2010–11	1ª	15th	
2011–12	1ª	15th	

Season	Division	Place	Copa de la Reina
2012–13	2ª	11th	
2013–14	2ª	3rd	
2014–15	2ª	5th	
2015–16	2ª	4th	
2016–17	2ª	12th	
2017–18	Pref.	15th	
2018–19	1ª Cat.	15th	

== Former internationals ==
- Algeria: Lydia Miraoui
- Hungary: Réka Demeter
- Mexico: Maribel Domínguez, Marylin Díaz
- Panama: Máxima González, Amarelis De Mera
- Portugal: Mónica Gonçalves, Carolina Mendes
- Spain: Débora García, Esther Sullastres
- Uruguay: Stefanía Maggiolini
