= Leonie Pankratz =

German footballer

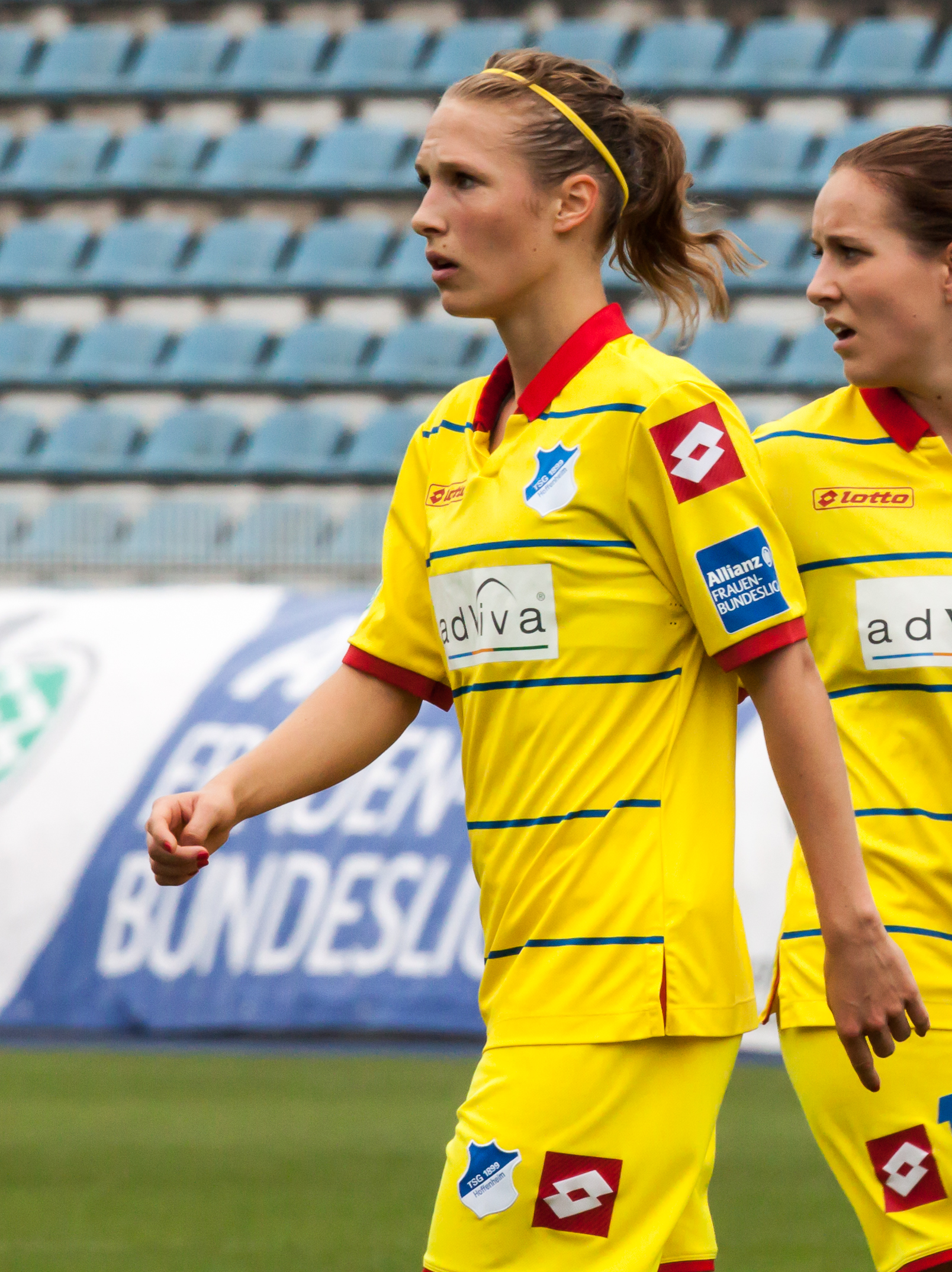
- Pankratz in the Hoffenheim jersey in 2014

Personal information
- Date of birth: 25 January 1990 (age 36)
- Place of birth: Giessen, Germany
- Height: 1.65 m (5 ft 5 in)
- Position: Defender

Team information
- Current team: HJK Helsinki

Youth career
- 1996–2006: VfB Gießen
- 2006–2008: 1. FFC Frankfurt

Senior career*
Years	Team	Apps	(Gls)
2007–2009	1. FFC Frankfurt II	28	(1)
2009–2010	Levante	9	(0)

International career
2006–2007	Germany U-17	7	(0)
- * Club domestic league appearances and goals

Leonie Pankratz (born 25 January 1990) is a German footballer who plays as a defender for HJK Helsinki.

== Personal life ==
Pankratz studied at the University of Porto. Pankratz had previously studied English at the University of Heidelberg.

== International career ==
Pankratz represented the German U-17 women's national team seven times.

== Honours ==
- Taça de Portugal Feminina:2013
