= Yohana Gómez =

Spanish footballer (born 1994)

Personal information
- Full name: Yohana Gómez Camino
- Date of birth: 20 January 1994 (age 32)
- Place of birth: Toledo, Spain
- Height: 1.68 m (5 ft 6 in)
- Position: Goalkeeper

Team information
- Current team: Rayo Vallecano
- Number: 13

Senior career*
Years	Team	Apps	(Gls)
2012–2013	Guadamur		
2013–2014	Almagro		
2014–2017	Guadamur		
2017–2020	CD Tacón	13+	
2020–2021	Real Madrid	4	(0)
2021–	Rayo Vallecano	4	(0)
- * Club domestic league appearances and goals as of 15:58, 4 June 2022 (UTC)

Yohana Gómez Camino (born 20 January 1994) is a Spanish footballer who plays as a goalkeeper for Rayo Vallecano.

== Club career ==
Gómez started her career at Guadamur.
