= Manu Sánchez (footballer, born 1996) =

Spanish footballer

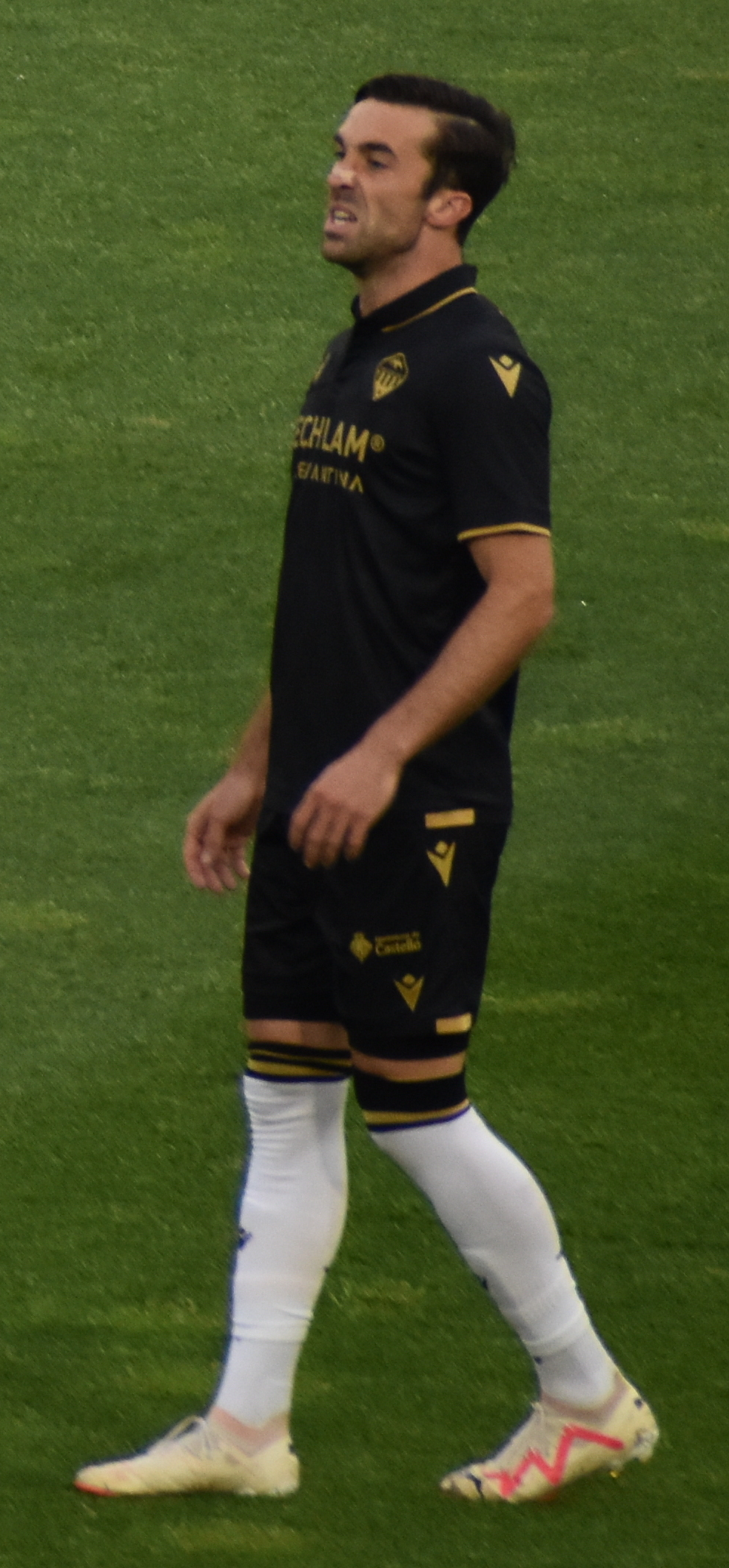
- Sánchez with Castellón in 2024

Personal information
- Full name: Manuel Sánchez García
- Date of birth: 24 March 1996 (age 30)
- Place of birth: Osuna, Spain
- Height: 1.83 m (6 ft 0 in)
- Position: Right-back

Team information
- Current team: Juventud Torremolinos

Youth career
- 2005–2013: Sevilla
- 2013–2014: Osuna Bote
- 2014–2015: Cádiz

Senior career*
Years	Team	Apps	(Gls)
2013–2014	Osuna Bote	19	(8)
2014–2017	Cádiz B	83	(3)
2015–2019	Cádiz	1	(0)
2017–2018	→ El Ejido (loan)	10	(0)
2018–2019	→ Sevilla B (loan)	28	(3)
2019–2020	Tondela	0	(0)
2020	→ Rayo Majadahonda (loan)	6	(0)
2020–2021	Rayo Majadahonda	13	(0)
2021–2022	Unionistas	28	(0)
2022–2024	Castellón	71	(15)
2024–2025	Górnik Zabrze	10	(1)
2025	Levante	5	(0)
2025–2026	Ceuta	5	(1)
2026–	Juventud Torremolinos	0	(0)
- * Club domestic league appearances and goals as of 9 June 2026

Manuel "Manu" Sánchez García (born 24 March 1996) is a Spanish professional footballer who plays for Juventud de Torremolinos CF. Mainly a right-back, he can also play as a centre-back.

== Career ==
Born in Osuna, Seville, Andalusia, Sánchez joined Cádiz CF's youth sides in 2014, after making his senior debut with hometown side Osuna Bote Club in the Primera Andaluza. Initially a member of the Juvenil squad, he featured with the reserves in Tercera División before making his debut with the main squad on 17 May 2015, starting in a 3–0 Segunda División B away loss to Arroyo CP.

On 28 June 2017, Sánchez renewed his contract until 2019 and was loaned to third division side CD El Ejido, for one year. The following 9 January, he returned to the Limoneros and was assigned back at the B's.

On 14 July 2018, Sánchez further extended his link with Cádiz until 2020, and agreed to a one-year loan deal with Sevilla Atlético. On 2 July of the following year, he moved abroad for the first time in his career, signing a three-year deal with Portuguese Primeira Liga side CD Tondela.

Shortly after arriving, Sánchez broke his left clavicle during a friendly match, and left the side without making a single appearance on 22 January 2020, to join CF Rayo Majadahonda on loan back in his home country. On 15 September, he terminated his link with Tondela, and signed a permanent deal with the Majariegos the following day.

On 11 July 2021, Sánchez agreed to a contract with Primera División RFEF side Unionistas de Salamanca CF. Roughly one year later, he signed a two-year deal with fellow league team CD Castellón.

On 12 September 2023, Sánchez extended his link with the Orelluts for a further season. He finished the 2023–24 season with a career-best eight goals, helping the club to achieve promotion to Segunda División after a ten-year absence.

On 20 June 2024, Sánchez joined Polish Ekstraklasa side Górnik Zabrze on a two-year contract. He made his professional debut on 21 July, starting in a 2–0 away loss to Lech Poznań, and scored his first goal five days later, netting the opener in a 2–2 draw at Puszcza Niepołomice.

On 28 January 2025, Sánchez returned to Spain after agreeing to an 18-month deal with Levante UD in the second division. Rarely used as they achieved promotion to La Liga as champions, he terminated his link with the club on 5 July, and joined AD Ceuta FC on a two-year contract just hours later.

On 7 July 2026, after also being rarely used, Sánchez left the Caballas, and joined third division side Juventud de Torremolinos CF just hours later.

== Honours ==
Levante

- Segunda División: 2024–25
