= Nerea Agüero =

Spanish–Argentine footballer (born 1997)

Personal information
- Full name: Nerea Agüero García
- Date of birth: 14 October 1997 (age 29)
- Place of birth: Navalmoral de la Mata, Spain
- Height: 1.55 m (5 ft 1 in)
- Position: Right back

Team information
- Current team: Granada
- Number: 5

Senior career*
Years	Team	Apps	(Gls)
2010–2012	Sporting de Huelva B		
2012–2013	Sporting de Huelva	7	(0)
2013–2014	Sevilla B		
2013–2015	Sevilla	15	(0)
2015–2017	Torrelodones		
2017–2018	Alavés		
2018–2019	Zaragoza CFF		
2019–	Granada	59	(2)

International career^{‡}
2021–	Argentina	1	(0)
- * Club domestic league appearances and goals as of 18 April 2023 ‡ National team caps and goals as of 30 November 2021

Nerea Agüero García (born 14 October 1997) is a footballer who plays as a right back for Liga F club Granada CF and the Argentina national team.

== Early life ==
Agüero was born in Navalmoral de la Mata, Extremadura, to an Argentine father and a Spanish mother.

== Club career ==
Agüero has played for Sporting de Huelva, Sevilla FC, Torrelodones CF, Deportivo Alavés, Zaragoza CFF and Granada, all in Spain.

On the last day of July 2019, Granada CF announced the signing of Agüero. They put together a strong team with the aim of going up to the top division, but were left disappointed. She played at right back in 19 games out of 22 until the competition was halted due to COVID-19. Granada were second in the table, just one point behind Santa Teresa CD, with eight games still to play.

On 4 August 2020, Agüero renewed her contract with the Nasrid team. At the end of that month she was part of the Granada team which lost the Andalusian Cup final against [[8 Real Betis Féminas|Real Betis]].

== International career ==
Agüero made her senior debut for Argentina on 30 November 2021.
