= Santa Teresa CD (women) =

Spanish football club

- Full name: Santa Teresa Club Deportivo
- Founded: 1998
- Dissolved: 2023
- Ground: El Vivero, Badajoz
- Capacity: 1,500
- Chairman: (Spain) Pablo Ritoré
- Manager: (Spain) Juan Carlos Antúnez
- 2022–23: Segunda Federación – Group 2, retired
- Website: http://santateresabadajoz.com/
| Home colours | Away colours | Third colours |

Santa Teresa Club Deportivo was a Spanish women's football club based in Badajoz (Extremadura). Founded in 1998 and dissolved in 2023, it last played in the Segunda Federación – Group 2, and held home games at Estadio El Vivero, with a 1,500-seat capacity.

== History ==
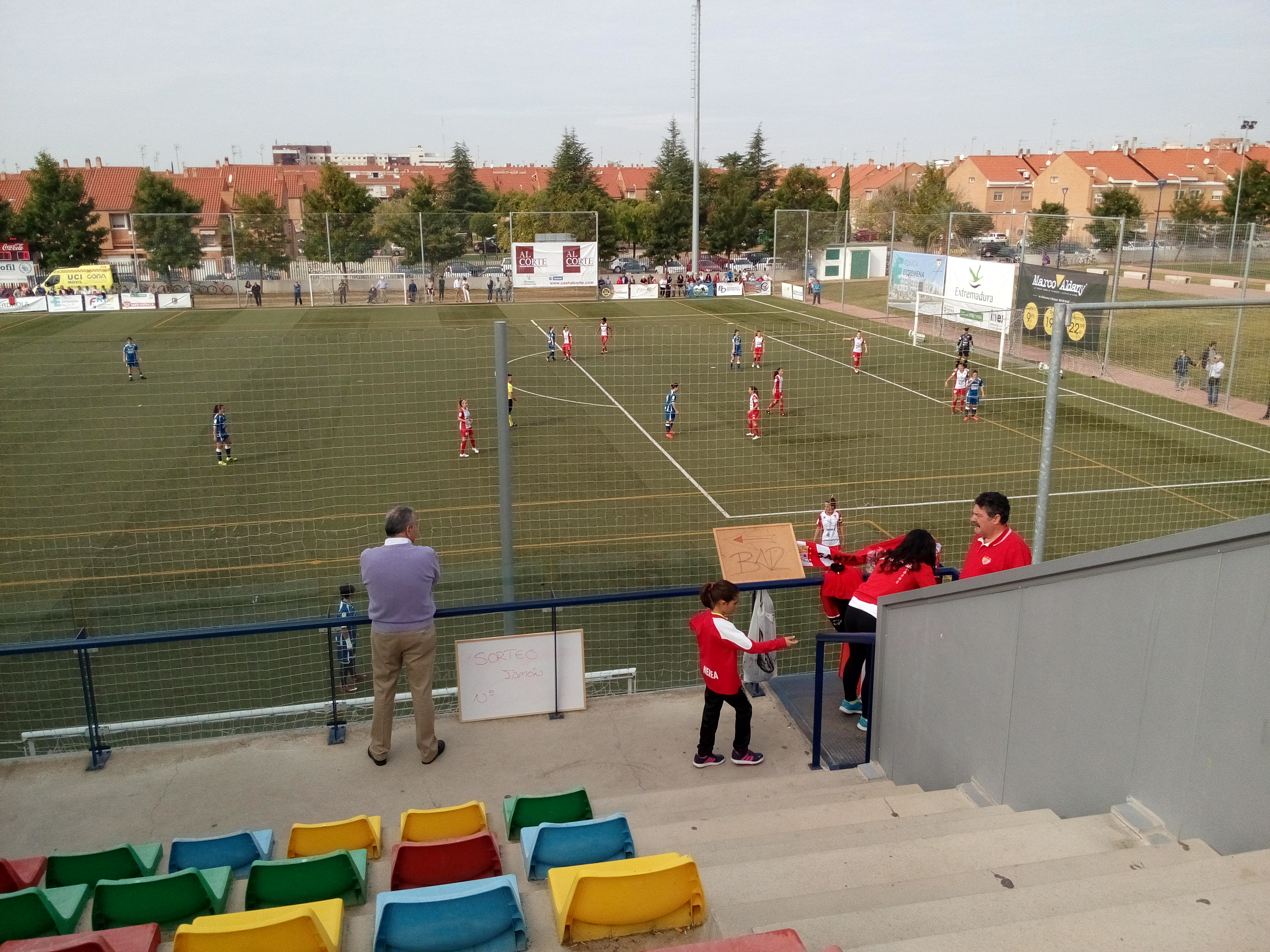
A match of the 2016–17 Primera División against Oiartzun at El Vivero.

Founded in 1998, Santa Teresa promoted to Segunda División in 2011, after winning the Extremadura Group of the Regional Leagues. Three years later, the club promoted to the top tier after beating Sporting Plaza de Argel in the last round of the promotion playoffs.

On 27 February 2017, the club approved to start its conversion into Sociedad Anónima Deportiva, becoming the first women's football club in Spain to do it since the creation of the SADs in 1990.

== Season by season ==
| Season | Div. | Pos. | Copa de la Reina |
|---|---|---|---|
| 2010–11 | Reg. | 1st | |
| 2011–12 | 2ª | 6th | |
| 2012–13 | 2ª | 2nd | |
| 2013–14 | 2ª | 1st | |
| 2014–15 | 1ª | 9th | |
| 2015–16 | 1ª | 11th | |
| 2016–17 | 1ª | 9th | |
| 2017–18 | 1ª | 16th | |
| 2018–19 | 2ª | 1st (Note: Along with the other Segunda División regional winners, the team took part in the playoffs to the Primera División but did not qualify; instead they moved to the new Primera División B but remained in the second tier of the system due to its creation.) | |
| 2019–20 | 2ªP | 1st | |
| 2020–21 | 1ª | 18th | |
| 2021–22 | 2ªP | 9th | |
| 2022–23 | 3ª | | |

== Honours ==
- Regional Championship
  - 2011
- Segunda División
  - 2014, 2019
- Segunda División Pro
  - 2020

== Players ==
=== Current squad ===
As of 2 July 2020 Note: Flags indicate national team as defined under FIFA eligibility rules; some limited exceptions apply. Players may hold more than one non-FIFA nationality.

| No. | Pos. | Nation | Player |
|---|---|---|---|
| 2 | MF | (United States) USA | Caeley Lordemann |
| 5 | DF | (Spain) ESP | Ariadna Rovirola |
| 10 | FW | (Spain) ESP | Mireya García |
| 14 | DF | (Spain) ESP | María Neira |
| 17 | FW | (Spain) ESP | Alba Mellado |
| 18 | DF | (Spain) ESP | Raquel Ayuso |
| 19 | MF | (Spain) ESP | Blanca Moreno |
| — | GK | (Spain) ESP | Ana María de Murga |
| — | GK | (Costa Rica) CRC | Daniela Solera |
| — | DF | (Spain) ESP | Loba |
| — | DF | (Japan) JPN | Hitomi Tanaka |

| No. | Pos. | Nation | Player |
|---|---|---|---|
| — | DF | (Portugal) POR | Marau |
| — | MF | (Spain) ESP | Laura Martínez |
| — | MF | (Spain) ESP | Aina Torres |
| — | MF | (Chile) CHI | Yipsy Ojeda |
| — | MF | (United States) USA | Sarah Gorham |
| — | MF | (United States) USA | Brooke Shank |
| — | FW | (Spain) ESP | María Marín |
| — | FW | (Argentina) ARG | Yazmín Ayelén |
| — | FW | (Cameroon) CMR | Henriette Michèle |

=== Reserve team ===
Note: Flags indicate national team as defined under FIFA eligibility rules; some limited exceptions apply. Players may hold more than one non-FIFA nationality.

| No. / Pos. / Nation / Player; 28 / MF / (Spain) ESP / Alba Zafra | No. / Pos. / Nation / Player; 59 / FW / (Estonia) EST / Lisette Tammik |
