= Danielle Hayden =

American soccer player (born 1998)

Personal information
- Date of birth: 11 August 1998 (age 28)
- Position: Defender

Team information
- Current team: Rayo Vallecano

Danielle Hayden (born 11 August 1998) is an American soccer player who plays as a defender for Rayo Vallecano.
