= Kelsey Dossey =

American soccer player

Personal information
- Full name: Kelsey Eileen Dossey
- Date of birth: July 13, 1996 (age 30)
- Height: 1.73 m (5 ft 8 in)
- Position: Goalkeeper

College career
Years	Team	Apps	(Gls)
2015–2018	Missouri Tigers	62	(0)

Kelsey Eileen Dossey (born July 13, 1996) is an American former soccer player who played as a goalkeeper for Espanyol.

== Career ==
Dossey signed her first professional soccer contract with FF Lugano 1976 in 2019. A year later Dossey signed with the Spanish club Espanyol. Around the 2020-21 season Dossey signed with the NWSL team the Chicago Red Stars. After that season conclueded Dossey retired from professional soccer. Since retiring from professional soccer Dossey coaches for Samford Bulldogs women's soccer program.
