= CD Badajoz (women) =

Spanish football club

Badajoz
- Full name: Club Deportivo Badajoz Femenino
- Founded: 2003 (as SPC Llanos de Olivenza); 2017 (as CD Badajoz)
- Ground: El Vivero, Badajoz
- Capacity: 5,000
- Chairman: Antonio Piriz
- Manager: Javier Serrano
- League: Segunda División
- 2014-15: Segunda División (Gr. 4), 2nd
Home colours

Club Deportivo Badajoz Femenino, formerly known as Sociedad Polideportiva Comarca Los Llanos de Olivenza and Club de Fútbol Femenino Badajoz Olivenza, is a Spanish women's football club from Olivenza in Badajoz, Extremadura founded in 2003.

== History ==
=== 2003–2013: SPC Los Llanos de Olivenza ===
After spending six years in the second tier SPC Llanos de Olivenza attained promotion to the country's top category in 2011 by topping its group and beating Abanto Club and Fundación Albacete in the play-offs.

=== 2013–2017: CFF Badajoz Olivenza ===
Two years later it was relegated to Segunda División. Llanos de Olivenza then merged with CFF Badajoz, taking its current name and changing its uniform from red-and-white stripes and blue shorts to black-and-white stripes and black shorts and integrating its structure in men's club CD Badajoz.

In 2014 it lost the promotion playoffs spot to Santa Teresa CD.

=== 2017–present: CD Badajoz ===
In 2017, after seven years of collaboration between, CFF Badajoz was integrated into CD Badajoz.

== Former internationals ==
- Brazil: Vânia Martins (Note: She also played for Equatorial Guinea, but FIFA declared her ineligible to play for that national team.)
- Portugal: Raquel Infante, Carolina Mendes

== Competition record ==
Former crest

Season	Division	Place	Copa de la Reina
2003–06	Reg.		
2006–07	2ª	7th	
2007–08	2ª	3rd	
2008–09	2ª	2nd	
2009–10	2ª	3rd	
2010–11	2ª	1st	
2011–12	1ª	11th	
2012–13	1ª	15th	
2013–14	2ª	2nd	
2014–15	2ª	2nd	
2015–16	2ª	8th	
2016–17	Reg.	2nd	
2017–18	Reg.	3rd	
2018–19	Reg.	1st	
