= Rayo Vallecano Femenino =

Spanish football team

- Full name: Rayo Vallecano de Madrid, S.A.D.
- Nickname: Rayo
- Founded: 2000; 26 years ago
- Ground: Ciudad Deportiva Fundación Rayo Vallecano; Madrid, Spain
- Capacity: 2,000
- Chairman: Raúl Martín Presa
- Manager: Carlos Santiso
- League: Segunda Federación
- 2021–22: Primera División, 16th (relegated)
- Website: http://www.rayovallecano.es/femenino/plantilla-femenino/rayo-femenino
| Home colours | Away colours | Third colours |

Rayo Vallecano Femenino is the women's football section of Madrid-based club Rayo Vallecano, currently playing in the Primera Federación. Between 2008 and 2011 it won three national championships and one national cup.

== History ==
Rayo Vallecano established its women's team in 2000, absorbing local club CD El Buen Retiro. In 2003 it earned promotion to the top league, and after two seasons in mid-table it established itself in the top positions from 2006. The team's golden era started in 2008, winning the national cup and narrowly missing a double, with Levante UD winning the championship on goal average.

This first trophy was followed by three championships in a row until 2011, becoming the second team to achieve this after Athletic Bilbao. Rayo Vallecano thus took part in the first three editions of the UEFA Women's Champions League after its relaunch in 2010. In its debut Rayo was knocked out in the first round by WFC Rossiyanka, while both in 2011 and 2012 it was defeated by Arsenal FC in the Round of 16 after overcoming Valur and PK-35 respectively.

Following the 2011 season the team had to cut down its budget, and it couldn't fight for the title in the next two seasons. In 2013 it was sixth, its worst result since 2005. In 2022, they were relegated to Primera Federación for the first time after spending 19 years in the top league.

== Honours ==
=== Titles ===
==== Official ====
- Spanish women's football championship (3):
  - 2009, 2010, 2011
- Spanish women's cup (1):
  - 2008

==== Invitational ====
- Pyrénées Cup (1):
  - 2009

=== Season by season ===
| Season | Div. | Pos. | Copa de la Reina | UEFA |
|---|---|---|---|---|
| 2001–02 | 2ª | 1st | | |
| 2002–03 | 2ª | 1st | | |
| 2003–04 | 1ª | 9th | | |
| 2004–05 | 1ª | 7th | Semifinals | |
| 2005–06 | 1ª | 4th | Semifinals | |
| 2006–07 | 1ª | 4th | Semifinals | |
| 2007–08 | 1ª | 2nd | Champion | |
| 2008–09 | 1ª | 1st | Semifinals | |
| 2009–10 | 1ª | 1st | Runner-up | Round of 32 |
| 2010–11 | 1ª | 1st | Quarterfinals | Round of 16 |
| 2011–12 | 1ª | 4th | Semifinals | Round of 16 |
| 2012–13 | 1ª | 6th | Quarterfinals | |
| 2013–14 | 1ª | 4th | Semifinals | |
| 2014–15 | 1ª | 6th | Quarterfinals | |
| 2015–16 | 1ª | 10th | | |
| 2016–17 | 1ª | 7th | Quarterfinals | |
| 2017–18 | 1ª | 11th | | |
| 2018–19 | 1ª | 12th | Quarterfinals | |
| 2019–20 | 1ª | 8th | Round of 16 | |
| 2020–21 | 1ª | 13th | | |
| 2021–22 | 1ª | 16th | Round of 16 | |
| 2022–23 | 2ª | 12th | 3rd Round | |
| 2023–24 | 3ª | 12th | 2nd Round | |
| 2024–25 | 3ª | 8th | 1st Round | |

=== UEFA competition record ===
| Season | Competition | Round | Opponent | Result | Scorers |
|---|---|---|---|---|---|
| 2009–10 | Champions League | Round of 32 | (Russia) Rossiyanka | 1–3 1–2 | Adriana, Pablos |
| 2010–11 | Champions League | Round of 32 | (Iceland) Valur | 3–0 1–1 | Adriana 2, Hermoso, Pablos |
| 2010–11 | Champions League | Round of 16 | (England) Arsenal | 2–0 1–4 | Adriana, Bermúdez, Pablos |
| 2011–12 | Champions League | Qualifying round | (Republic of Ireland) Peamount (Estonia) Pärnu (Slovenia) Krka | 1–0; 4–1; 4–0 | Pablos; Hermoso 2, Mellado, P. García; Hermoso 3, P. García |
| 2011–12 | Champions League | Round of 32 | (Finland) PK-35 | 3–0 4–1 | Pablos 2, Boho, S. García, Hermoso, Pizarro, Vega |
| 2011–12 | Champions League | Round of 16 | (England) Arsenal | 1–1 1–5 | Pablos 2 |

== Players ==
=== Current squad ===
As of 16 July 2022.

Note: Flags indicate national team as defined under FIFA eligibility rules; some limited exceptions apply. Players may hold more than one non-FIFA nationality.

| No. | Pos. | Nation | Player |
|---|---|---|---|
| 1 | GK | ESP | Patricia Larqué |
| 2 | DF | USA | Danielle Hayden |
| 3 | DF | ESP | Laia Ballesté |
| 4 | MF | ESP | Pilar García |
| 5 | DF | ESP | Paula Andújar |
| 6 | MF | ESP | Paula Fernández |
| 7 | FW | ESP | Iris |
| 8 | MF | JPN | Yoko Tanaka |
| 9 | FW | BRA | Isadora Freitas |
| 10 | MF | CHI | Yanara Aedo |
| 11 | FW | MNE | Slađana Bulatović |

| No. | Pos. | Nation | Player |
|---|---|---|---|
| 12 | MF | ESP | Patri Hidalgo |
| 13 | GK | ESP | Yohana Gómez |
| 14 | MF | ESP | Pauleta |
| 17 | FW | BRA | Millene Cabral |
| 18 | DF | CHI | Camila Sáez |
| 19 | FW | ESP | Carla Bautista |
| 22 | DF | ESP | María Bores |
| 27 | MF | ESP | Claudia Cabezas |
| 28 | DF | ESP | Esther Calderón |
| — | FW | GIB | Charlyann Pizzarello |

=== Former internationals ===
- Spain: Maripaz Azagra, Saray García, Sonia Bermúdez, Vanesa Gimbert, Jennifer Hermoso, Alexandra López, Adriana Martín, Melisa Nicolau, Natalia Pablos, Willy Romero, Cristina Vega, Sandra Vilanova
- Argentina: Marianela Szymanowski
- Colombia: Nicole Regnier
- Equatorial Guinea: Jade Boho
- Guatemala: Ana Lucía Martínez
- Serbia: Jelena Čubrilo
- Venezuela: Oriana Altuve
- Brazil: Milene Domingues
- Gibraltar: Charlyann Pizzarello
