= List of Sporting de Huelva seasons =

This is a list of seasons played by Sporting de Huelva, a Spanish women's football club, since its creation in 2004.

== Summary ==
Champions	Runners-up	Promoted	Relegated

Season	League										Cup	Top scorer	
Season	Tier	Div	Pos	Pld	W	D	L	GF	GA	Pts	Cup	Name(s)	Goal
2005–06	2	2ª	1st	26	21	1	4	86	25	64			
2006–07	1	1ª	10th	26	5	9	12	28	57	24			
2007–08	1	1ª	11th	26	6	5	15	27	43	23			
2008–09	1	1ª	9th	30	10	7	13	43	48	37		(Brazil) Dayane da Rocha	10
2009–10	1	1ª	13th	24	14	0	10	61	41	42	Quarterfinals	(Spain) Sandra Jiménez	17
2010–11	1	1ª	12th	26	11	4	11	54	45	37		(Spain) Alharilla Casado	16
2011–12	1	1ª	8th	34	17	5	12	51	48	56		(Spain) Anita Hernández	13
2012–13	1	1ª	9th	30	11	5	14	41	52	38		(Spain) Esther González	15
2013–14	1	1ª	8th	30	11	7	12	41	42	40	Quarterfinals	(Spain) Cristina Martín-Prieto	14
2014–15	1	1ª	8th	30	11	8	11	51	55	41	Champion	(Brazil) Joyce Borini	13
2015–16	1	1ª	8th	30	13	7	10	44	39	46	Quarterfinals	(Spain) Cristina Martín-Prieto	12
2016–17	1	1ª	10th	30	9	8	13	47	56	35		(Spain) Anita Hernández	13
2017–18	1	1ª	9th	30	11	5	14	35	42	38		(Spain) Anita Hernández	10
2018–19	1	1ª	14th	30	6	7	17	22	50	25	Round of 16	(Spain) Anita Hernández (Argentina) Flor Bonsegundo	5
2019–20	1	1ª	14th	21	5	3	13	13	36	18	Round of 16	(Spain) Patricia Mascaró (Spain) Patri Ojeda	3
2020–21	1	1ª	10th	34	12	8	14	37	48	44		(Brazil) Dany Helena	12
2021–22	1	1ª	10th	30	6	13	11	28	44	31	Runner-ups	(Spain) Ana Marcos	10
2022–23	1	1ª	13th	30	6	7	17	24	54	25	Third round	(Slovakia) Patrícia Hmírová	3
2023–24	1	1ª	16th	30	2	3	25	20	63	9	Round of 16	(Japan) Miku Kojima	4
2024–25	2	2ª	14th	26	1	5	20	13	53	8	Round of 16	(Ivory Coast) Ida Guehai	5
2025–26	2	3ª	3rd	26	15	5	6	54	20	50	Third round	(Spain) Andrea López Nuñez	13
