= 2021–22 Copa de la Reina de Fútbol =

2021–2022 Copa de la Reina de Fútbol
Tournament details
- Country: Spain
- Teams: 52

Final positions
- Champions: Barcelona (9th title)
- Runners-up: Sporting de Huelva

Tournament statistics
- Matches played: 40
- Goals scored: 123 (3.08 per match)
- Top goal scorer: Alexia Putellas (4 goals)

Awards
- Best player: María Pilar León

The 2021–22 Copa de la Reina de Fútbol was the 40th edition of the Spanish women's association football national cup. Barcelona were the defending champions, having won the last two editions. They defended the title with a 6-1 win over Sporting de Huelva.

== Format changes ==
A total of 52 clubs competed in this year's tournament, making it the most participants in the cup's history. All 16 teams in Primera División, all 32 teams from Segunda División Pro, and the four promoted teams from Primera Nacional de Fútbol. Reserve teams are excluded from participating in the tournament.

== Schedule and format ==
All ties are played in a one match decider at a home ground. The first draw for the tournament took place on 24 September 2021, at Royal Spanish Football Federation (RFEF) headquarters in Las Rozas.

Round	Draw date	Date	Fixtures	Clubs	Format details
First round	24 September 2021	6 October 2021; 7 October 2021; 13 October 2021	15	30 → 15	Knock-out tournament type: Single match.
Second round	15 October 2021	10 November 2021; 11 November 2021	8	16 → 8	Knock-out tournament type: Single match.
Third round	4 January 2022	26 January 2022	8	16 → 8	Knock-out tournament type: Single match.
Round of 16	11 February 2022	1 March 2022; 2 March 2022; 3 March 2022	8	16 → 8	Knock-out tournament type: Single match.
Quarter-final	4 March 2022	16 March 2022; 17 March 2022; 24 April 2022	4	8 → 4	Knock-out tournament type: Single match.
Semi-final	12 May 2022	24 May 2022; 25 May 2022	2	4 → 2	Knock-out tournament type: Single match.
Final	12 May 2022	29 May 2022	1	2 → 1	Single match at Estadio Santo Domingo (Alcorcón, Madrid)

Notes

- Single-match rounds ending in a tie will be decided in extra time; and if it persists, by a penalty shootout.

== First round ==
=== Draw ===
The draw was held on 24 September 2021, in the RFEF headquarters in Las Rozas.

Group A	Group B
Pozuelo de Alarcón; Peluquería Mixta Friol; Aldaia; Málaga; Collerense	Dux Logroño; Pozoalbense; Oviedo; Espanyol; Racing de Santander; Sporting de Gijón; Deportivo de La Coruña; Seagull; Real Unión; Santa Teresa; Femarguín; AEM; Alhama; Cacereño; Zaragoza; Albacete; Castellón; Levante Las Planas; Osasuna; Córdoba; Elche; Juan Grande; La Solana; Pradejón; Parquesol; Granada

=== Matches ===
6 October 2021	Collerense	0–4	Zaragoza	Palma
16:15		Report	Berg 37'; Álvarez 67', 73', 90'	Stadium: Coll d’en Rebassa; Referee: Morey García (Balearic Islands)

6 October 2021	Granada	1–0	Castellón	Granada
17:00	Adriana 9'	Report		Stadium: Ciudad Deportiva Ground 2

6 October 2021	Sporting de Gijón	1–3	Alhama	Gijón
17:00	Noelia 38'	Report	Helena 33'; Violeta 46'; Marina 90+1'	Stadium: Ground 1 of Mareo; Referee: Bianca Cosme (Asturias)

6 October 2021	Peluquería Mixta Friol	4–2	Osasuna	Friol
17:30	Yuki 8'; Alicia 27', 36', 65'	Report	Vilariño 35', 67'	Stadium: A Reigosa; Attendance: 300

6 October 2021	Cacereño	2–1	Pradejón	Cáceres
17:30	Guerra 43'; Imade 75'	Report	Lidia 2'	Stadium: Príncipe Felipe

6 October 2021	Málaga	2–0	Seagull	Málaga
18:00	Clo 53'; Torralvo 80' (pen.)	Report		Stadium: Campo Roma Luz

6 October 2021	Real Unión	0–1	Santa Teresa	San Cristóbal de la Laguna
18:00		Report	Akaba 44'	Stadium: Municipal de La Salud

6 October 2021	Pozuelo de Alarcón	1–9	Deportivo de La Coruña	Pozuelo de Alarcón
19:30	Marina 66'	Report	Paula 17', 86'; Carlota 44'; Inés Altamira 46'; Adule 57'; María Ruiz 75', 83'; Aroa Guerra 81'; Ainhoa Marín 88'	Stadium: Valle de las Cañas; Referee: Espinosa Ríos (Community of Madrid)

6 October 2021	Espanyol	1–0 (a.e.t.)	Pozoalbense	Sant Adrià de Besòs
19:30	Nayadet 103'	Report		Stadium: Ciutat Esportiva Dani Jarque; Referee: Florencia Muñoz (Catalonia)

6 October 2021	Racing de Santander	2–0	Parquesol	Torrelavega
19:30	Henar 5'; Adubea 39'	Report		Stadium: Santa Ana

6 October 2021	La Solana	1–1 (a.e.t.) (5–3 p)	Albacete	La Solana
20:00	Amani 58'	Report	Tania 88'	Stadium: La Moheda

7 October 2021	Aldaia	1–3	Córdoba	Aldaia
18:00	Fuentes 20'	Report	Cintia 18'; Ocón 52'; Lara 90+4'	Stadium: Municipal d'Aldaia

7 October 2021	Elche	1–2	AEM	Elche
18:00	Maci 66'	Report	Hernández 7' (o.g.); Alexia 63'	Stadium: Enrique Cervera

7 October 2021	Juan Grande	3–0	Levante Las Planas	San Bartolomé de Tirajana
20:30	Lizarraga 60'; García 71'; Jiménez 90'	Report		Stadium: Campo Juan Grande

13 October 2021	Oviedo	3–1	Femarguín	Oviedo
20:30	Carlota 4'; Requena 44'; Isina 73'	Report	Suárez 89'	Stadium: Tensi

== Second round ==
=== Draw ===
The draw was held on 15 October 2021, in the RFEF headquarters in Las Rozas.

Group A	Group B
Peluquería Mixta Friol; Málaga	Dux Logroño; Oviedo; Espanyol; Racing de Santander; Deportivo de La Coruña; AEM; Santa Teresa; Cacereño; Zaragoza; Alhama; Córdoba; Juan Grande; La Solana; Granada

=== Matches ===
10 November 2021	Peluquería Mixta Friol	1–7	Racing de Santander	Friol
16:30	Alicia 64'	Report	Camino 1', 35'; Henar 27', 45+1'; Martin 47'; Princella 77'; Marijao 82'	Stadium: A Reigosa

10 November 2021	Dux Logroño	1–0	Santa Teresa	Logroño
17:00	Rebecca 83'	Report		Stadium: Las Gaunas

10 November 2021	Deportivo de La Coruña	0–1	Granada	A Coruña
18:30		Report	Mascaró 84'	Stadium: Abegondo; Attendance: 200; Referee: Méndez López (Galicia)

10 November 2021	Alhama	3–1	Córdoba	Alhama de Murcia
19:00	Pérez 34'; Martí 36', 66'	Report	Ruano 64'	Stadium: Guadalentín

10 November 2021	AEM	1–2 (a.e.t.)	Espanyol	Lleida
20:00	Pixu 84' (pen.)	Report	Maite 9'; Dana 109'	Stadium: Recasens; Attendance: 300; Referee: Iria Pujol (Catalonia)

10 November 2021	Oviedo	1–1 (a.e.t.) (5–4 p)	La Solana	Oviedo
20:00	Irantzu 55'	Report	Irina 16'	Stadium: Tensi

10 November 2021	Juan Grande	2–0	Cacereño	San Bartolomé de Tirajana
20:30	Moran 44'; Quintana 59'	Report		Stadium: Campo Juan Grande

11 November 2021	Málaga	0–0 (a.e.t.) (4–2 p)	Zaragoza	Málaga
17:00		Report		Stadium: La Rosaleda; Attendance: 2,145

== Third round ==
=== Draw ===
The draw was held on 4 January 2021, in the RFEF headquarters in Las Rozas.

Group A	Group B	Group C
Málaga	Dux Logroño; Oviedo; Espanyol; Racing de Santander; Alhama; Juan Grande; Granada	Valencia; Sporting de Huelva; Athletic Club; Betis; Rayo Vallecano; Eibar; Alavés; Villarreal

=== Matches ===
26 January 2022	Dux Logroño	0–0 (a.e.t.) (4–5 p)	Villarreal	Logroño
16:15		Report		Stadium: Mundial 82; Referee: Cuesta Arribas (Galicia)

26 January 2022	Málaga	0–2	Rayo Vallecano	Málaga
17:00		Report	E. Calderón 62'; Pauleta 65'	Stadium: La Rosaleda; Attendance: 1,700; Referee: Arregui Gamir (Basque Country)

26 January 2022	Espanyol	2–0	Alavés	Sant Adrià de Besòs
18:00	Manu 32'; Ohale 51' (o.g.)	Report		Stadium: Ciutat Esportiva Dani Jarque; Referee: Cebollada López (Aragon)

26 January 2022	Alhama	3–1	Eibar	Alhama de Murcia
18:00	V. Quiles 14'; S. Rubio 55'; L. Pérez 82'	Report	Aida 84'	Stadium: Guadalentín; Referee: Casal Fernandez (Galicia)

26 January 2022	Racing de Santander	0–5	Athletic Club	Torrelavega
19:30		Report	Nekane 10'; Oguiza 45'; Pinedo 63'; S. Ortega 77'; Arana 86'	Stadium: Santa Ana; Referee: =Peláez Arnillas (Castile and León)

26 January 2022	Oviedo	1–4	Sporting de Huelva	Oviedo
20:00	C. Suárez 90'	Report	Anita 17', 49'; M. Ramírez 44' (pen.); E. Edgren 86'	Stadium: Tensi; Referee: Sánchez Miguel (Catalonia)

26 January 2022	Granada	0–1	Betis	Granada
20:00		Report	L. León 51'	Stadium: Los Cármenes; Attendance: 1,000; Referee: Espinosa Ríos (Community of Madrid)

26 January 2022	Juan Grande	0–1	Valencia	San Bartolomé de Tirajana
20:00		Report	O. Altuve 27'	Stadium: Campo Juan Grande; Referee: Martínez Martínez (Murcia)

== Round of 16 ==
=== Draw ===
The draw was held on 11 February 2022, in the RFEF headquarters in Las Rozas.

Group B	Group C	Group D
Alhama; Espanyol	Rayo Vallecano; Villarreal; Athletic Club; Betis; Valencia; Sporting de Huelva	Barcelona; Real Madrid; Levante; Atlético de Madrid; Real Sociedad; Granadilla; Madrid CFF; Sevilla

=== Matches ===
1 March 2022	Alhama	0–3	Real Madrid	Alhama de Murcia
19:00		Report	Peter 30'; Esther 90+3'; Zornoza 90+6' (pen.)	Stadium: Guadalentín; Attendance: 2,500; Referee: Gallastegui Perez (Basque Country)

1 March 2022	Athletic Club	0–1	Sevilla	Lezama
21:00		Report	García 6'	Stadium: Lezama; Attendance: 614; Referee: Frías Acedo (Aragon)

2 March 2022	Valencia	0–3	Granadilla	Paterna
14:00		Report	Martín-Prieto 17'; Pisco 30' (pen.); Blom 51'	Stadium: Ciudad Deportiva de Paterna; Referee: Martínez Madrona (Murcia)

2 March 2022	Rayo Vallecano	1–3	Barcelona	Madrid
16:00	Paula 82' (pen.)		Hermoso 4', 53'; Alexia 42'	Stadium: Ciudad Deportiva; Referee: Suárez González (Castile and León)

2 March 2022	Villarreal	1–2	Real Sociedad	Villarreal
18:00	Sheila 84' (pen.)	Report	Eizagirre 3', 24'	Stadium: Ciudad Deportiva; Referee: Muñoz Di Giovambattista (Catalonia)

3 March 2022	Betis	1–4	Levante	Seville
15:00	Vicky 88'	Report	Giovana 12'; Alba 70', 90+2'; Falcón 90+5'	Stadium: Luis del Sol; Referee: Gil Soriano (Galicia)

3 March 2022	Espanyol	1–2	Madrid CFF	Sant Adrià de Besòs
17:00	Szymanowski 48'	Report	Geyse 51'; Albuquerque 90'	Stadium: Ciutat Esportiva Dani Jarque; Referee: Luna Varo (Andalusia)

3 March 2022	Sporting de Huelva	2–1	Atlético de Madrid	Huelva
19:00	Keane 37'; Ramírez 64'	Report	Bárbara 67'	Stadium: Nuevo Colombino; Referee: Rivera Olmedo (Basque Country)

== Quarter-final ==
=== Draw ===
The draw was held on 4 March 2022, in the RFEF headquarters in Las Rozas.

Qualified team

Real Madrid
Sevilla
Granadilla
Barcelona
Real Sociedad
Levante
Madrid CFF
Sporting de Huelva

=== Matches ===
16 March 2022	Granadilla	2–0	Sevilla	Granadilla de Abona
16:00	Falknor 45'; N'Guessan 54'	Report		Stadium: La Palmera; Attendance: 527; Referee: Gil Soriano (Galicia)

16 March 2022	Real Sociedad	0–3	Barcelona	San Sebastián
20:45		Report	Pina 10'; Alexia 53', 59'	Stadium: Zubieta; Attendance: 1,200; Referee: Martinez Martinez (Murcia)

17 March 2022	Madrid CFF	1–2 (a.e.t.)	Sporting de Huelva	San Sebastián de los Reyes
17:00	Geyse 39'	Report	Anita 26', 122'	Stadium: Matapiñoneras; Referee: Frías Acedo (Aragon)

24 April 2022	Levante	1–3	Real Madrid	Buñol
12:00	Alba Redondo 3' (pen.)	Report	Esther 8'; Olga Carmona 11'; Asllani 16'	Stadium: Buñol; Referee: González González (Galicia)
Note: Match originally scheduled for 16 March 2022; however, it was postponed to a new date due to COVID-19 pandemic outbreak on the Levante squad.

== Semi-final ==
=== Draw ===
The draw was held on 12 May 2022, in the RFEF headquarters in Las Rozas.

Qualified team

Granadilla
Barcelona
Sporting de Huelva
Real Madrid

=== Matches ===
24 May 2022	Granadilla	0–1	Sporting de Huelva	Alcorcón
21:00		Report	Ojeda 73'	Stadium: Estadio Municipal de Santo Domingo

25 May 2022	Barcelona	4–0	Real Madrid	Alcorcón
21:00	Martens 19'; Bonmatí 47'; Caldentey 53'; Oshoala 75'	Report		Stadium: Estadio Municipal de Santo Domingo

== Final ==
29 May 2022	Sporting de Huelva	1–6	Barcelona	Alcorcón
11:30	Castelló 62'	Report	Dolan 25' (o.g.); Mapi León 32'; Crnogorčević 71'; Pina 80'; Martens 86'; Alexia 90+3'	Stadium: Estadio Municipal de Santo Domingo; Referee: Zulema González González

== Top goalscorers ==
As of 29 March 2022

Rank	Player	Club	Goals
1	(Spain) Alexia Putellas	Barcelona	4
1	(Spain) Alicia Martínez	Peluquería Mixta Friol	4
1	(Spain) Anita Marcos	Sporting de Huelva	4
4	(Guatemala) Andrea Álvarez	Zaragoza	3
