= 2016–17 Primera División (women) =

29th edition of Spain's highest women's football league

Primera División
- Season: 2016–17
- Champions: Atlético de Madrid (1st title)
- Relegated: Oiartzun; Tacuense
- Champions League: Atlético de Madrid; Barcelona
- Matches: 240
- Goals: 775 (3.23 per match)
- Top goalscorer: Jennifer Hermoso (35 goals)
- Biggest home win: Barcelona 13–0 Oiartzun (Round 27)
- Biggest away win: Tacuense 0–7 Atlético de Madrid (Round 6)
- Highest scoring: Barcelona 13–0 Oiartzun (Round 27)
- Longest winning run: 11 games Barcelona
- Longest unbeaten run: 30 games Atlético de Madrid
- Longest losing run: 10 games Fundación Albacete
- Highest attendance: 17,011; Valencia 6–0 Levante

The 2016–17 Primera División Femenina de Fútbol, also known as Liga Iberdrola for sponsorship reasons, was the 29th edition of Spain's highest women's football league. Athletic Club were the defending champions. The competition started on 3 September 2016.

== Team changes ==
Betis and Tacuense will make their debut in the top league after achieving promotion in the previous season.

The two promoted clubs replaced Oviedo Moderno and Collerense, relegated to Segunda División.

== Teams ==
Location of the 2016–17 Primera División teams
Canary Islands location of the 2016–17 Primera División teams

=== Stadia and locations ===
Team	Home city	Stadium
Athletic Club	Bilbao	Lezama
Atlético de Madrid	Madrid	Cerro del Espino
Barcelona	Barcelona	Joan Gamper
Espanyol	Barcelona	Dani Jarque
Fundación Albacete	Albacete	Andrés Iniesta
Granadilla	Granadilla de Abona	Francisco Suárez
Levante	Valencia	El Terrer
Oiartzun	Oiartzun	Karla Lekuona
Rayo Vallecano	Madrid	Ciudad Deportiva
Betis	Seville	Luis del Sol
Real Sociedad	San Sebastián	Zubieta
Santa Teresa	Badajoz	El Vivero
Sporting de Huelva	Huelva	El Conquero
Tacuense	San Cristóbal de La Laguna	Pablos Abril
Valencia	Valencia	Antonio Puchades
Zaragoza CFF	Zaragoza	Pedro Sancho

=== Personnel and sponsorship ===
Team	Head coach	Captain	Kit manufacturer	Main shirt sponsor
Athletic Club	Joseba Agirre	Iraia Iturregi	Nike	Kutxabank
Atlético de Madrid	Ángel Villacampa	Amanda Sampedro	Nike	Herbalife
Barcelona	Xavier Llorens	Marta Unzué	Nike	
Betis	María del Mar Fernández	Irene Guerrero	Adidas	
Espanyol	Rubén Rodríguez	Paloma Fernández	Joma	Ilumax
Fundación Albacete	Milagros Martínez	Matilde Martínez	Hummel	Nexus
Granadilla	Antonio Ayala	Cindy García	Mercury	Egatesa
Levante	Andrés Tudela	Sonia Prim	Nike	East United
Oiartzun	Jon Alkorta	Anne Mugarza	Gedo	Alcampo
Rayo Vallecano	Miguel Ángel Quejigo	Alicia Gómez	Kelme	
Real Sociedad	Igor San Miguel	Aintzane Encinas	Adidas	S21sec
Santa Teresa	Juan Carlos Antúnez	Estefanía Lima	Luanvi	Clínica Extremeña
Sporting de Huelva	Antonio Toledo	Anita Hernández	Mercury	Cajasol
Tacuense	Fanfi Herrera	Tamara García	Joma	Canaryfly
Valencia	Cristian Toro	Ivana Andrés	Adidas	Mr Jeff
Zaragoza CFF	Alberto Berna	Nuria Mallada	Hummel	Aragón

=== Managerial changes ===
Team	Outgoing manager	Manner of departure	Date of vacancy	Position in table	Incoming manager	Date of appointment
Rayo Vallecano	Alberto Ruiz de la Hermosa	End of contract	30 June 2016	Pre-season	Miguel Ángel Quejigo	11 July 2016
Espanyol	Antonio Polidano	Sacked	8 November 2016	16th	Luis Miguel Marín	11 November 2016
Tacuense	Javier Márquez	Sacked	14 November 2016	16th	Zeben González (caretaker)	16 November 2016
Tacuense	Zeben González	interim	16 November 2016	16th	Fanfi Herrera	21 November 2016
Espanyol	Luis Miguel Marín	Resigned	6 April 2017	15th	Rubén Rodríguez	6 April 2017

== Overview ==
On 20 May 2017, Atlético de Madrid achieved the title after beating Real Sociedad in the last round by 2–1. The Colchoneras ended the season without defeat.

One week before, newcomer team Tacuense was relegated to Segunda División. The league ended with the relegation of Basque Oiartzun two seasons after their last promotion.

== League table ==
Pos	Team	Pld	W	D	L	GF	GA	GD	Pts	Qualification or relegation
1	Atlético de Madrid (C)	30	24	6	0	91	17	+74	78	Qualification for the UEFA Champions League and Copa de la Reina
2	Barcelona	30	24	3	3	98	13	+85	75	Qualification for the UEFA Champions League and Copa de la Reina
3	Valencia	30	20	8	2	69	11	+58	68	Qualification for the Copa de la Reina
4	Levante	30	18	3	9	53	49	+4	57	Qualification for the Copa de la Reina
5	Athletic Club	30	16	5	9	64	44	+20	53	Qualification for the Copa de la Reina
6	Granadilla	30	13	7	10	53	41	+12	46	Qualification for the Copa de la Reina
7	Rayo Vallecano	30	14	1	15	49	53	−4	43	Qualification for the Copa de la Reina
8	Real Sociedad	30	12	6	12	44	34	+10	42	Qualification for the Copa de la Reina
9	Santa Teresa	30	10	6	14	28	46	−18	36	
10	Sporting de Huelva	30	9	8	13	47	56	−9	35	
11	Betis	30	10	4	16	36	51	−15	34	
12	Zaragoza CFF	30	8	8	14	31	65	−34	32	
13	Espanyol	30	5	8	17	30	60	−30	23	
14	Fundación Albacete	30	5	5	20	37	76	−39	20	
15	Oiartzun (R)	30	4	6	20	23	74	−51	18	Relegation to the Segunda División
16	Tacuense (R)	30	3	6	21	22	85	−63	15	Relegation to the Segunda División

Source: Futbolme
Rules for classification: 1) points; 2) head-to-head points; 3) goal difference; 4) number of goals scored
(C) Champions; (R) Relegated

== Results ==
Home \ Away	ATH	ATM	FCB	BET	ESP	FAB	GRA	LEV	OIA	RAY	RSO	STE	SPH	TAC	VAL	ZAR
Athletic Club	—	1–2	0–4	3–2	3–3	2–0	2–0	3–2	4–0	3–2	1–1	2–1	4–0	7–0	1–2	5–1
Atlético de Madrid	1–1	—	2–1	2–1	6–0	1–0	3–0	5–0	7–0	2–0	2–1	5–0	4–1	11–0	0–0	4–1
Barcelona	2–1	1–1	—	3–0	5–0	7–0	3–0	4–0	13–0	3–0	2–0	6–0	5–1	3–0	1–1	3–0
Betis	1–2	0–2	1–1	—	2–1	3–1	1–3	1–2	1–0	0–3	1–0	1–1	3–4	2–3	0–0	1–0
Espanyol	1–1	1–2	1–6	2–0	—	3–3	1–1	1–3	0–2	0–3	1–3	2–0	2–1	2–0	0–2	0–2
Fundación Albacete	3–1	1–4	0–2	0–2	0–2	—	2–3	3–5	2–0	0–2	1–1	2–0	3–3	2–1	0–4	2–3
Granadilla	4–0	0–0	0–4	4–0	2–1	8–1	—	3–0	2–1	4–1	0–1	1–0	4–3	2–0	1–3	2–0
Levante	3–1	0–3	2–1	2–1	2–1	2–1	3–2	—	2–1	1–2	0–0	4–0	2–0	2–1	2–1	3–0
Oiartzun	0–5	1–4	0–1	2–3	0–0	2–1	1–0	1–2	—	0–1	1–1	0–1	1–1	2–0	0–1	0–2
Rayo Vallecano	2–3	0–3	0–4	0–4	3–2	3–1	3–1	0–2	7–1	—	0–3 (Note: Match awarded to Real Sociedad as Rayo Vallecano committed illegal alignment.)	1–1	2–1	5–1	0–1	2–1
Real Sociedad	2–0	0–1	0–3	0–2	1–1	1–0	0–0	2–1	4–0	2–0	—	0–1	1–2	8–1	0–4	6–1
Santa Teresa	1–2	1–3	2–0	3–0	3–0	1–3	2–1	0–3	2–2	0–2	1–0	—	1–0	3–0	0–0	1–1
Sporting de Huelva	1–1	2–3	0–1	0–2	2–1	2–2	1–1	1–1	2–0	3–1	2–3	3–1	—	3–2	0–0	3–0
Tacuense	0–2	0–7	1–2	0–0	0–0	1–1	1–1	1–3	3–3	0–2	0–2	0–1	2–4	—	0–5	1–1
Valencia	3–1	1–1	0–1	5–0	0–0	4–0	2–2	6–0	3–0	4–1	3–0	2–0	2–0	1–0	—	5–0
Zaragoza CFF	1–3	2–2	0–6	2–1	2–1	3–2	1–1	1–1	2–2	2–1	2–1	0–0	1–1	0–1	0–4	—

Updated to match(es) played on 21 May 2017. Source: La Liga
Legend: Blue = home team win; Yellow = draw; Red = away team win.

== Season statistics ==
As of Week 30

=== Top scorers ===
Rank	Player	Club	Goals
1	Jennifer Hermoso	FC Barcelona	35
2	Sonia Bermúdez	Atlético de Madrid	32
3	María Paz Vilas	Valencia CF	28
4	Charlyn Corral	Levante UD	20
4	Natalia Pablos	Rayo Vallecano	20
6	Yulema Corres	Athletic Club	18
7	Nahikari García	Real Sociedad	15
7	Esther González	Atlético de Madrid	15
7	María José Pérez	Levante UD	15
10	Olga García	FC Barcelona	14
10	Paula Moreno	Betis	14
12	Nekane Díez	Athletic Club	12
12	Anita Hernández	Sporting de Huelva	12
12	Cristina Martín-Prieto	Sporting de Huelva	12
15	Estefanía Lima	Santa Teresa CD	10
15	Alexia Putellas	FC Barcelona	10
15	Luana Spindler	UD Granadilla TS	10
15	Erika Vázquez	Athletic Club	10
19	Priscila Borja	Atlético de Madrid	9
19	Nuria Mallada	Zaragoza CFF	9

=== Hat-tricks ===
Player	For	Against	Result	Round
Paula Moreno	Betis	Sporting de Huelva	3–4 (h)	1
María Paz Vilas	Valencia CF	Zaragoza CFF	5–0 (h)	1
Sonia Bermúdez	Atlético de Madrid	RCD Espanyol	6–0 (h)	3
Yulema Corres	Athletic Club	UD Tacuense	7–0 (h)	3
Sonia Bermúdez	Atlético de Madrid	Fundación Albacete	1–4 (a)	4
Alexia Putellas	FC Barcelona	Rayo Vallecano	0–4 (a)	4
Luana Spinder	UD Granadilla TS	Fundación Albacete	1–3 (a)	6
Esther González	Atlético de Madrid	UD Tacuense	0–7 (a)	6
Olga García	FC Barcelona	Fundación Albacete	7–0 (h)	7
Luana Spinder^{4}	UD Granadilla TS	Sporting de Huelva	4–3 (h)	7
Jennifer Hermoso	FC Barcelona	RCD Espanyol	1–6 (a)	6*
Nahikari García	Real Sociedad	Oiartzun KE	4–0 (h)	13
Erika Vázquez	Athletic Club	Oiartzun KE	4–0 (h)	6*
Charlyn Corral	Levante UD	Fundación Albacete	3–5 (a)	20
Sonia Bermúdez	Atlético de Madrid	UD Tacuense	11–0 (h)	21
Marta Corredera	Atlético de Madrid	UD Tacuense	11–0 (h)	21
Jennifer Hermoso	FC Barcelona	Athletic Club	0–4 (a)	26
Jennifer Hermoso^{6}	FC Barcelona	Oiartzun KE	13–0 (h)	27
Carmen María Alegría	Rayo Vallecano	Oiartzun KE	7–1 (h)	29

^{4} Player scored 4 goals
^{6} Player scored 6 goals

=== Best goalkeepers ===
Rank	Player	Club	Goals against	Minutes	Coeff.
1	Christiane Endler	Valencia CF	9	2070	1:230
2	Sandra Paños	FC Barcelona	10	1980	1:198
3	Dolores Gallardo	Atlético de Madrid	13	2070	1:159.23
4	María Asunción Quiñones	Real Sociedad	19	1710	1:90
5	Noelia Ramos	UD Granadilla TS	20	1440	1:72
6	Ainhoa Tirapu	Athletic Club	38	2340	1:61.58
7	Émmeline Mainguy	Santa Teresa CD	42	2520	1:60
8	Noelia Bermúdez	Levante UD	30	1755	1:58.5

=== Player of the week ===
Week	Player of the Week	Club	Week's Statline
Week 1	Paula Moreno	Betis	3G (vs Sporting de Huelva)
Week 2	Nuria Mallada	Zaragoza CFF	1G (vs Atlético de Madrid)
Week 3	Yulema Corres	Athletic Club	3G (vs UD Tacuense)
Week 4	Sonia Bermúdez	Atlético de Madrid	3G (GWG) (vs Fundación Albacete)
Week 5	Nahikari García	Real Sociedad	2G (GWG) (vs Rayo Vallecano)
Week 6	Esther González	Atlético de Madrid	3G, 1A (vs UD Tacuense)
Week 7	Luana Spindler	UD Granadilla TS	4G (GWG) (vs Sporting de Huelva)
Week 8	Tania Carballo	UD Tacuense	1G (vs UD Granadilla TS)
Week 9	Silvia Doblado	UD Granadilla TS	1G (vs Betis)
Week 10	Nuria Mallada	Zaragoza CFF	2G (GWG) (vs Fundación Albacete)
Week 11	Miriam López	Betis	CS (vs Real Sociedad)
Week 12	Raquel Carreño	Rayo Vallecano	1G (vs Betis)
Week 13	Nahikari García	Real Sociedad	3G (vs Oiartzun KE)
Week 14	Estefanía Lima	Santa Teresa CD	1G (GWG) (vs Sporting de Huelva)
Week 15	Miriam López	Betis	CS (vs Fundación Albacete)
Week 16	Beatriz Parra	Betis	2G (GWG) (vs Sporting de Huelva)
Week 17	"Chica" Martín	Santa Teresa CD	1G, 1A (vs FC Barcelona)
Week 18	Nayeli Rangel	Sporting de Huelva	1A (vs Oiartzun KE)
Week 19	Laura Fernández	Atlético de Madrid	1G (GWG) (vs Fundación Albacete)
Week 20	Charlyn Corral	Levante UD	3G (GWG) (vs Fundación Albacete)
Week 21	Estefanía Banini	Valencia CF	2G, 2A (vs Betis)
Week 22	María Paz Vilas	Valencia CF	2G (GWG) (vs Athletic Club)
Week 23	Leyre Fernández	Real Sociedad	1G (GWG) (vs Fundación Albacete)
Week 24	Christiane Endler	Valencia	CS (vs Santa Teresa CD)
Week 25	Alexia Putellas	FC Barcelona	2G, 1A (vs Betis)
Week 26	Jennifer Hermoso	FC Barcelona	3G (vs Athletic Club)
Week 27	Jennifer Hermoso	FC Barcelona	6G (vs Oiartzun KE)
Week 28	Ida Guehai	Levante UD	2G (vs Santa Teresa CD)
Week 29	Carmen María Alegría	Rayo Vallecano	3G (vs Oiartzun KE)
Week 30	Erika Vázquez	Athletic Club	2G, 1A (vs RCD Espanyol)

=== All-season Team ===
Source: All-star team is a squad consisting of the eleven most impressive players as supporters

All-season team

Pos	Name	Team
GK	Christiane Endler	Valencia CF
DF	Kenti Robles	Atlético de Madrid
DF	Marta Torrejón	FC Barcelona
DF	Andrea Pereira	Atlético de Madrid
DF	María Pilar León	Atlético de Madrid
CDM	Maite Oroz	Athletic Club
CM	Amanda Sampedro	Atlético de Madrid
CM	Claudia Zornoza	Valencia CF
RW	Nahikari García	Real Sociedad
CF	Cristina Martín-Prieto	Sporting de Huelva
LW	Charlyn Corral	Levante UD

=== Notable attendances ===
- 17,011 Valencia CF 6–0 Levante UD (23 April 2017 at Mestalla)
- 13,935 Atlético de Madrid 2–1 FC Barcelona (11 December 2016 at Vicente Calderón)
- 10,642 Atlético de Madrid 1–1 Athletic Club (26 March 2017 at Vicente Calderón)
- 8,122 Levante UD 2–1 Valencia CF (19 November 2016 at Ciutat de València)
- 7.497 UD Granadilla Tenerife Sur 2–0 UD Tacuense (25 March 2017 at Heliodoro Rodríguez López)
- 6,268 FC Barcelona 1–1 Atlético de Madrid (13 May 2017 at Mini Estadi)
- 3,517 Fundación Albacete 0–2 Rayo Vallecano (1 April 2017 at Carlos Belmonte)
- 3,400 Sporting de Huelva 2–0 Oiartzun KE (12 February 2017 at Nuevo Colombino)
- 3,200 Atlético de Madrid 2–1 Real Sociedad (20 May 2017 at Estadio Cerro del Espino)
- 3,150 Zaragoza CFF 0–4 Valencia CF (15 January 2017 at La Romareda)

== Transfers ==
Team	In	Out
Athletic Club	Andere Legina (Madrid CFF) GK; Estibaliz Aizpurua (Oiartzun KE) DF; María Blanco (Mulier FCN) DF; Estibaliz Bajo (Oiartzun KE) FW; Lucía García (Oviedo Moderno CF) FW	Saioa González (retired) DF; Eztizen Merino (Oiartzun KE) DF; Irene Paredes (Paris Saint-Germain) DF; Maddi Torre (Santa Teresa CD) DF; Amaia Olabarrieta (retired) MF
Atlético de Madrid	Andreea Părăluță (ASA Târgu Mureș) GK; María Isabel Rodríguez "Misa" (CD Fermarguín) GK; Alexandra López (Rayo Vallecano) DF; Carmen Menayo (Santa Teresa CD) DF; Andrea Pereira (RCD Espanyol) DF; Marta Corredera (Arsenal Ladies) MF; Falcón (FC Barcelona) MF; Pilar García (Keynsham Town LFC) MF; Sara Rubio (CD Al-Basit) MF; Genoveva Añonma (Suwon FMC) FW	Sara Ezquerro (CD Tacón) GK; Noelia Gil (UD Granadilla TS) GK; Marta Carro (AGSM Verona) DF; Rita Fontemanha (Sporting CP) DF; Vanesa García (retired) DF; Noelia Tudela (retired) DF; Nagore Calderón (Levante UD) MF; Mariela Coronel (Madrid CFF) MF; Débora García (Valencia CF) MF; Miriam Rodríguez "Kuki" (Betis) FW
FC Barcelona	Andrea Giménez (RCD Espanyol) GK; Leila Ouahabi (Valencia CF) DF; Line Røddik Hansen (Olympique Lyon) DF; Victoria Losada (Arsenal LFC) MF; Andressa Alves (Montpellier HSC) FW; Ange N'Guessan (Gintra Universitetas) FW	Núria Garrote (RCD Espanyol) DF; Esther Romero (Valencia CF) DF; Andrea Falcón (Atlético de Madrid) MF; Pilar Garrote (RCD Espanyol) MF; Andreia Norton (SC Braga) MF; Cristina Baudet (RCD Espanyol) FW
Betis	Miriam Rodríguez "Kuki" (Atlético de Madrid) FW; Yaiza Relea (Rayo Vallecano) FW	Esther Salguero (retired) DF; Rocío Mateos (Granada CF) MF; Miriam Fernández (??) FW
RCD Espanyol	Miriam De Francisco (Santa Teresa CD) GK; Núria Garrote (FC Barcelona) DF; Mar Mazuecos (FC Levante Las Planas) DF; Helena Serrano (CE Sant Gabriel) DF; Carola García (Santa Teresa CD) MF; Pilar Garrote (FC Barcelona) MF; Brenda Pérez (CD Canillas) MF; Dulce Quintana (Club Sportivo Limpeño) MF; Cristina Baudet (FC Barcelona) FW; Elisa del Estal (Fundación Albacete) FW; Sara del Estal (EDF Logroño) FW; Luana Lima (Rio Preto EC) FW; Carla Niubó (1. FC Nürnberg) FW; Gemma Sala (FC Levante Las Planas) FW	Andrea Giménez (FC Barcelona) GK; Carla Cotado (Lorca Deportiva) DF; Andrea Pereira (Atlético de Madrid) DF; Júlia Rebollo (Tennessee Tech Golden Eagles) DF; Mònica Bácter (CD Fontsanta Fatjó) MF; Aroa León (Lorca Deportiva) MF; Aina Torres (Santa Teresa CD) MF; Ana Troyano (retired) MF; Laura Benito Rocamora (CE Europa) FW; Anna Molet (CE Sant Gabriel) FW; Glòria Pelegrí (CE Rubí, futsal) FW; Gemma Plà (Monroe Mustangs) FW
Fundación Albacete	María Lomas (CD Zeneta) GK; María Sanjuan (CF Murcia Féminas) GK; Yannel Correa (CF Murcia Féminas) DF; Marisa Escribano (CFF Albacete) DF; Carmen María Fernández (CD Al-Basit) DF; Patricia Padilla (EDF Logroño) DF; Sofía Botija (Madrid CFF) MF; Marisa Martín (CFF Albacete) MF; Tomo Matsukawa (Waseda University) MF; Alicia Muñoz (Sporting de Huelva) FW; Andrea Ojeda (Boca Juniors) FW; Macarena Portales (Madrid CFF) FW	Raquel Lafuente (??) GK; Autumn Wheeler (Alhama CF) DF "Leles" Carrión (Valencia CF) MF; Vanesa Lorca (CFF Albacete) MF; Llanos Madrigal (CFF Albacete) MF; Elisa del Estal (RCD Espanyol) FW
UD Granadilla Tenerife Sur	Noelia Gil (Atlético de Madrid) GK; Ayano Dōzono (Orca Kamogawa FC) DF; Jackie Simpson (South Florida Bulls) DF; Virginia García (Sporting de Huelva) MF; Patricia Gavira (Sporting de Huelva) MF; María Martí (Clayton State University) MF; Mar Rubio (CD Achamán Santa Lucía) FW; Luana Spindler (AAD Vitória das Tabocas) FW	María Pilar González (UD Tacuense) GK; Wendy Acosta (AD Moravia) MF; Tibiabin Pérez (UD Tacuense) DF; Carla Gómez (Zaragoza CFF) MF; Laura Ortega (Charleston Cougars) FW; María José Pérez (Levante UD) FW
Levante UD	Raquel Infante (Åland United) DF; Sandra Torres (UD Collerense) DF; Nagore Calderón (Atlético de Madrid) MF; Ida Guehai (Kristianstads DFF) MF; Daniela Montoya (CD Formas Íntimas) MF; María José Pérez (UD Granadilla TS) FW	Lurdes Vilches (Lorca Deportiva) GK; Leticia Méndez (Madrid CFF) DF; Mariví Simó (retired) DF; Andrea Esteban (assistant Levante UD "B") MF/AM; Aila Fuster (Georgia Southern Eagles) MF; Paula Guerrero (Ball State Cardinals) MF
Oiartzun KE	Ane Otxoa de Zuazola (Oviedo Moderno CF) GK; Joana Arranz (Santa Teresa CD) DF; Ainara Manterola (Real Sociedad) DF; Eztizen Merino (Athletic Club) DF; Sara Olaizola (CD Mariño) MF; Nekane Quiñones (CD Mariño) MF; Silvia Ruiz (EDF Logroño) MF; Irantzu Ibarrola (Aurrera Vitoria) FW; Eguzkiñe Peña (Real Sociedad) FW	Ainitze Rodríguez (CD Hernani) GK; Estibaliz Aizpurua (Athletic Club) DF; Araitz Etxabe (??) DF; Erika García (??) DF; Olatz Hoyos (Oiartzun KE "B") DF; Alazne Inziarte (Oiartzun KE "B") MF; Estibaliz Bajo (Athletic Club) FW; Ana Mar Luzuriaga (SD Eibar) FW; Malen Morán (Oiartzun KE "B") FW
Rayo Vallecano	Cristina Portomeñe (CD Parquesol) GK; Paulita Díaz (Torrelodones CF) DF; Paula López (Santa Teresa CD) DF; Rosita Martín (Madrid CFF) MF; Carmen María Alegría (CF Murcia Féminas) FW; Laura Domínguez (Madrid CFF) FW; Sheila García (Dínamo Guadalajara) FW; Natalia Pablos (Arsenal Ladies) FW; Beatriz Torija (Dínamo Guadalajara) FW; Jessica Vílchez (Atlético Jiennense) FW; Rocío Zafra (AD Alhóndiga) FW	Ana María Catalá (Madrid CFF) DF; Marta García "Costa" (Madrid CFF) DF; Alexandra López (Atlético de Madrid) DF; Saray García (Madrid CFF) MF; Patricia Mascaró (Madrid CFF) MF; Lorena Muñoz (CD Tacón) MF; Ana Lucía Martínez (Sporting de Huelva) FW; Noelia Morales (FF La Solana) FW; Nicole Regnier (América de Cali) FW; Yaiza Relea (Betis) FW; Marianela Szymanowski (Valencia CF) FW
Real Sociedad	Nuria Sánchez (Valencia CF) DF; Naiara Beristain (Valencia CF) MF; Nerea Eizagirre (Añorga KKE) MF	Ainara Manterola (Oiartzun KE) DF; Izaskun Leoz (Mulier FCN) MF; Eguzkiñe Peña (Oiartzun KE) FW
Santa Teresa CD	Émmeline Mainguy (EA Guingamp) GK; Cristina Contreras (Rayo Vallecano "B") DF; María de las Mercedes Deocano (Atlético Monachil) DF; Sandra Figueiredo (XV de Novembro -Piracicaba-) DF; María del Puerto Pérez (CD Salamanca FF) DF; Maddi Torre (Athletic Club) DF; Ria Öling (Turun Palloseura) MF; Hitomi Tomiyama (Sfida Setagaya FC) MF; Aina Torres (RCD Espanyol) MF; Tia Hälinen (HJK Helsinki) FW; Nayadet López (Sporting Plaza de Argel) FW	Miriam De Francisco (RCD Espanyol) GK; Joana Arranz (Oiartzun KE) DF; Paula López (Rayo Vallecano) DF; Carmen Menayo (Atlético de Madrid) DF; Lixy Rodríguez (??) DF; Tamara Antolín (Mérida AD) MF; Carola García (RCD Espanyol) MF; María Rosa Martínez (Juventud UVA) MF; Fátima Pinto (Sporting CP) MF; Amanda Bodión (??) FW; Natalia Francisco (FVPR El Olivo) FW
Sporting de Huelva	Thaís Picarte (AD Centro Olímpico) GK; Sandra Bernal (Zaragoza CFF) DF; Silvia Mérida (Atlético Madrid "B") DF; Jenny Danielsson (Kristianstads DFF) MF; Vera Djatel (Linköpings FC) MF; Nayeli Rangel (Unattached) MF; Juliete Silva "Juju" (São José EC) MF; Gabi Gutiérrez (UD Collerense) FW; Ana Lucía Martínez (Rayo Vallecano) FW; Laura Rus (Icheon Daekyo) FW; Patrícia Sochor (Ferroviária de Araraquara) FW	Marta Gayà (??) GK; María Sampalo (Málaga CF) GK; Virginia García (UD Granadilla TS) MF; Patricia Gavira (UD Granadilla TS) MF; Marina Martí (Sporting Plaza de Argel) FW; Alicia Muñoz (Fundación Albacete) FW
UD Tacuense	María Pilar González (UD Granadilla TS) GK; Laura Dorta (Atlético Tacoronte) DF; Patricia Ojeda (CD Achamán Santa Lucía) DF; Tibiabin Pérez (UD Granadilla TS) DF; Nisamar Pérez (CD Echedey) MF	
Valencia CF	Christiane Endler (Colo-Colo) GK; Esther Romero (FC Barcelona) DF; Yanara Aedo (Washington Spirit "Reserves") MF "Leles" Carrión (Fundación Albacete) MF; Débora García (Atlético de Madrid) MF; Estefanía Banini (Washington Spirit) FW; Marianela Szymanowski (Rayo Vallecano) FW	Gema Rueda (retired) GK; Leila Ouahabi (FC Barcelona) DF; Nuria Sánchez (Real Sociedad) DF; Naiara Beristain (Real Sociedad) MF; Arantxa Lozano (retired) MF; Sara Monforte (Zaragoza CFF) MF; Ana "Willy" Romero (AFC Ajax) FW
Zaragoza CFF	María José Pons (CE Sabadell) GK; Carla Gómez (UD Granadilla TS) MF; Sara Monforte (Valencia CF) MF; Gloria Villamayor (Colo-Colo) FW	Sandra Bernal (Sporting de Huelva) DF; Lydia Hastings (??) MF; Maren Johansen (??) FW; Veronica Maglia (BSC Young Boys Bern) FW

Source: La Liga
