= 2022–23 Liga F =

Spanish women's 1st tier association football season

Liga F
- Season: 2022–23
- Dates: 10 September 2022 – 21 May 2023
- Champions: Barcelona; 8th title
- Relegated: Alavés; Alhama
- Champions League: Barcelona; Real Madrid; Levante
- Matches: 240
- Goals: 761 (3.17 per match)
- Top goalscorer: Alba Redondo (27 goals)
- Biggest home win: Barcelona 8–0 Alavés (20 November 2022)
- Biggest away win: Real Betis 0–7 Levante (4 December 2022)
- Highest scoring: Real Sociedad 6–5 Alavés (19 March 2022)
- Longest winning run: Barcelona (27 matches)
- Longest unbeaten run: Barcelona (29 matches)
- Longest winless run: Sporting de Huelva; Levante Las Planas (12 matches)
- Longest losing run: Sporting de Huelva (10 matches)
- Highest attendance: 24,107; Atlético Madrid 1–6 Barcelona (27 November 2022)

The 2022–23 Primera División Femenina de Fútbol season, renamed Liga F (finetwork Liga F for sponsorship reasons), was the 35th edition of the Primera División Femenina de España de fútbol, and the first edition with professional status in its history. The tournament was organized by the Liga Profesional Femenina de Fútbol (LPFF). The competition was supposed to start on 10 September 2022, but the first week matches were postponed. As a result, the competition started on 17 September 2022, and ended on 21 May 2023.

Barcelona were the defending champions after winning undefeated the previous season. They defended the title with 28 wins, 1 draw and 1 defeat.

== Summary ==
=== Postponements ===
On 8 September 2022, the Royal Spanish Football Federation (RFEF) referees threaten to not attend any Matchday 1 as part of their continue strike for higher wages. As a result, all Liga F matches scheduled for 10–11 September were postponed after clubs were ready to play, but referees did not participate.

On 15 September 2022, a deal was reached between the parties to end the strike, which paved the way for the league season to start.

=== Sponsorship ===
On 6 October 2022, the LPFF announced the telecommunication company Finetwork (stylized finetwork) would become the official league sponsor for the next three seasons. As a result, the league will be renamed finetwork Liga F.

== Teams ==
=== Promoted from Primera Federación ===
Alhama was promoted to the top flight for the first in its history. Levante Las Planas return after being relegated in the 2013–14 season.

=== Relegated to Primera Federación ===
Eibar were relegated after two seasons, while Rayo Vallecano after spending 19 years in the top division.

=== Stadiums and locations ===
| Team | Home city | Stadium | Capacity |
|---|---|---|---|
| Alavés | Vitoria-Gasteiz | Ciudad Deportiva José Luis Compañón | 2,500 |
| Alhama | Alhama de Murcia | Deportivo del Guadalentín | 1,500 |
| Athletic Club | Bilbao | Lezama 2 | 3,200 |
| Atlético Madrid | Madrid | Centro Deportivo Wanda | 2,500 |
| Barcelona | Barcelona | Johan Cruyff Stadium | 6,000 |
| Levante | Valencia | Ciudad Deportiva de Buñol | 3,000 |
| Levante Las Planas | Sant Joan Despí | Municipal de Les Planes | 1,000 |
| Madrid CFF | San Sebastián de los Reyes | Estadio Fernando Torres | 3,500 |
| Real Betis | Seville | Estadio Luis del Sol | 1,300 |
| Real Madrid | Madrid | Alfredo Di Stéfano Stadium | 6,000 |
| Real Sociedad | San Sebastián | Campo José Luis Orbegozo | 2,500 |
| Sevilla | Seville | Estadio Jesús Navas | 5,000 |
| Sporting de Huelva | Huelva | Campo del C.D. Lamiya | 1,500 |
| UDG Tenerife | Granadilla de Abona | Estadio Francisco Suárez | 2,700 |
| Valencia | Valencia | Estadio Antonio Puchades | 3,000 |
| Villarreal | Villarreal | Ciudad Deportiva Pamesa Cerámica | 5,000 |

=== Personnel and sponsorship ===
| Team | Head coach | Captain | Kit manufacturer | Main shirt sponsor |
|---|---|---|---|---|
| Alavés | (Spain) Mikel Crespo | (Spain) Alba Aznar | Puma | |
| Alhama | (Spain) Randri Garcia | (Spain) Judith Caravaca | Joma | Universae |
| Athletic Club | (Spain) Iraia Iturregi | (Spain) Garazi Murua | New Balance | Euskaltel |
| Atlético Madrid | (Spain) Óscar Fernández | (Spain) Amanda Sampedro | Nike | Herbalife |
| Barcelona | (Spain) Jonatan Giráldez | (Spain) Alexia Putellas | Nike | Spotify |
| Levante | (Spain) Sánchez Vera | (Spain) Alharilla | Macron | |
| Levante Las Planas | (Spain) Ferran Bellet | (Spain) Mari Paz Vilas | Hummel | Croexsa |
| Madrid CFF | (Spain) María Pry | (Spain) Paola Ulloa | Adidas | Thermor |
| Real Betis | (Spain) Francis Díaz | (Spain) Nuria Ligero | Hummel | Eternal Energy |
| Real Madrid | (Spain) Alberto Toril | (Spain) Ivana Andrés | Adidas | Emirates – Fly Better |
| Real Sociedad | (Spain) Natalia Arroyo | (Spain) Nerea Eizagirre | Macron | Euskaltel |
| Sevilla | (Argentina) Cristian Toro | (Spain) Nagore | Castore | |
| Sporting de Huelva | (Spain) Antonio Toledo | (Spain) Sandra Castelló | | Huelva original |
| UDG Tenerife | (Spain) José Ángel Herrera | (Spain) Pisco | Hummel | Egatesa |
| Valencia | (Spain) Andrea Esteban | (Spain) Marta Carro | Puma | Cazoo |
| Villarreal | (Spain) Sara Mestre | (Spain) Lara Mata | Joma | Pamesa Cerámica |

=== Managerial changes ===
| Team | Outgoing manager | Date of vacancy | Manner of departure | Position in table | Incoming manager | Date of appointment |

== League table ==
=== Standings ===
| Pos | Team | Pld | W | D | L | GF | GA | GD | Pts | Qualification or relegation |
|---|---|---|---|---|---|---|---|---|---|---|
| 1 | Barcelona (C) | 30 | 28 | 1 | 1 | 118 | 10 | +108 | 85 | Qualification for the Champions League group stage |
| 2 | Real Madrid | 30 | 24 | 3 | 3 | 80 | 25 | +55 | 75 | Qualification for the Champions League second round |
| 3 | Levante | 30 | 21 | 3 | 6 | 80 | 34 | +46 | 66 | Qualification for the Champions League first round |
| 4 | Atlético de Madrid | 30 | 16 | 9 | 5 | 54 | 35 | +19 | 57 | |
| 5 | Madrid CFF | 30 | 17 | 5 | 8 | 65 | 48 | +17 | 56 | |
| 6 | UDG Tenerife | 30 | 11 | 7 | 12 | 35 | 44 | −9 | 40 | |
| 7 | Sevilla | 30 | 10 | 10 | 10 | 45 | 44 | +1 | 40 | |
| 8 | Real Sociedad | 30 | 10 | 9 | 11 | 54 | 50 | +4 | 39 | |
| 9 | Valencia | 30 | 11 | 4 | 15 | 36 | 55 | −19 | 37 | |
| 10 | Athletic Club | 30 | 10 | 5 | 15 | 34 | 44 | −10 | 35 | |
| 11 | Levante Las Planas | 30 | 6 | 8 | 16 | 24 | 61 | −37 | 26 | |
| 12 | Real Betis | 30 | 6 | 7 | 17 | 26 | 62 | −36 | 25 | |
| 13 | Sporting de Huelva | 30 | 6 | 7 | 17 | 24 | 54 | −30 | 25 | |
| 14 | Villarreal | 30 | 5 | 8 | 17 | 27 | 65 | −38 | 23 | |
| 15 | Alhama (R) | 30 | 5 | 6 | 19 | 24 | 57 | −33 | 21 | Relegation to Primera Federación |
| 16 | Alavés (R) | 30 | 5 | 6 | 19 | 35 | 73 | −38 | 21 | Relegation to Primera Federación |

Source: Liga F
Rules for classification: 1) Points; 2) Head-to-head points; 3) Goal difference; 4) Number of goals scored
(C) Champions; (R) Relegated

=== Results ===
| Home \ Away | ALA | ALH | ATH | ATM | BAR | LEV | LLP | MAD | BET | RMA | RSO | SEV | SPH | UDG | VAL | VIL |
|---|---|---|---|---|---|---|---|---|---|---|---|---|---|---|---|---|
| Alavés | — | 1–1 | 1–1 | 1–2 | 0–4 | 0–2 | 1–0 | 1–2 | 3–1 | 1–3 | 1–5 | 2–0 | 2–1 | 1–1 | 4–1 | 0–4 |
| Alhama | 3–1 | — | 2–1 | 1–3 | 0–2 | 2–3 | 0–0 | 0–3 | 0–2 | 1–5 | 1–1 | 0–0 | 0–0 | 1–0 | 0–1 | 0–1 |
| Athletic Club | 1–0 | 1–0 | — | 1–4 | 0–3 | 0–3 | 2–0 | 0–2 | 2–0 | 0–3 | 1–3 | 1–1 | 3–0 | 0–1 | 0–2 | 1–1 |
| Atlético Madrid | 1–0 | 1–0 | 1–0 | — | 1–6 | 2–1 | 0–1 | 1–1 | 2–1 | 0–0 | 1–1 | 1–1 | 5–0 | 4–0 | 6–2 | 2–2 |
| Barcelona | 8–0 | 4–0 | 3–0 | 4–0 | — | 2–1 | 7–0 | 7–0 | 7–0 | 1–0 | 2–1 | 4–0 | 3–0 | 2–0 | 5–1 | 5–0 |
| Levante | 2–1 | 3–1 | 2–0 | 2–1 | 0–4 | — | 5–0 | 2–1 | 4–0 | 2–2 | 4–1 | 5–1 | 3–0 | 2–0 | 1–1 | 3–1 |
| Levante Las Planas | 1–0 | 3–1 | 0–1 | 1–2 | 0–4 | 1–1 | — | 2–2 | 2–2 | 1–4 | 1–0 | 1–1 | 1–2 | 2–3 | 0–3 | 2–2 |
| Madrid CFF | 5–1 | 6–2 | 3–2 | 2–2 | 2–1 | 1–0 | 3–1 | — | 4–0 | 0–4 | 2–2 | 0–0 | 2–3 | 2–0 | 3–1 | 1–2 |
| Real Betis | 1–1 | 1–2 | 1–0 | 1–1 | 0–3 | 0–7 | 1–2 | 1–3 | — | 1–3 | 0–0 | 3–0 | 0–0 | 1–2 | 0–1 | 1–1 |
| Real Madrid | 7–1 | 5–1 | 2–1 | 1–0 | 0–4 | 3–2 | 3–0 | 3–2 | 4–0 | — | 4–1 | 2–0 | 1–0 | 0–1 | 2–0 | 2–1 |
| Real Sociedad | 6–5 | 2–1 | 1–1 | 1–2 | 2–5 | 3–4 | 3–0 | 0–2 | 2–2 | 1–1 | — | 0–3 | 4–0 | 1–1 | 4–0 | 2–0 |
| Sevilla | 4–2 | 2–0 | 1–1 | 1–3 | 1–1 | 2–4 | 5–0 | 4–2 | 3–0 | 0–2 | 2–2 | — | 1–0 | 2–2 | 2–0 | 1–0 |
| Sporting de Huelva | 2–2 | 1–0 | 2–3 | 1–3 | 0–3 | 0–3 | 2–0 | 1–2 | 0–1 | 0–1 | 0–2 | 1–1 | — | 2–2 | 0–0 | 1–1 |
| UDG Tenerife | 1–1 | 0–0 | 0–2 | 1–1 | 0–6 | 0–1 | 0–1 | 5–2 | 0–2 | 2–3 | 2–1 | 3–1 | 2–0 | — | 1–0 | 2–0 |
| Valencia | 2–1 | 1–3 | 1–2 | 0–1 | 0–4 | 4–2 | 1–1 | 0–2 | 3–0 | 1–6 | 2–1 | 2–0 | 1–2 | 2–1 | — | 2–0 |
| Villarreal | 1–0 | 3–1 | 1–6 | 1–1 | 1–4 | 0–6 | 0–0 | 0–3 | 0–3 | 0–4 | 0–1 | 0–5 | 2–3 | 1–2 | 1–1 | — |

Source: Liga F
Legend: Blue = home team win; Yellow = draw; Red = away team win.

=== Positions by round ===
The table lists the positions of teams after each week of matches. In order to preserve chronological evolvements, any postponed matches are not included to the round at which they were originally scheduled, but added to the full round they were played immediately afterwards.

| Team ╲ Round | 1 | 2 | 3 | 4 | 5 | 6 | 7 | 8 | 9 | 10 | 11 | 12 | 13 | 14 | 15 | 16 | 17 | 18 | 19 | 20 | 21 | 22 | 23 | 24 | 25 | 26 | 27 | 28 | 29 | 30 |
|---|---|---|---|---|---|---|---|---|---|---|---|---|---|---|---|---|---|---|---|---|---|---|---|---|---|---|---|---|---|---|
| Barcelona | 3 | 1 | 1 | 1 | 1 | 1 | 1 | 1 | 1 | 1 | 1 | 1 | 1 | 1 | 1 | 1 | 1 | 1 | 1 | 1 | 1 | 1 | 1 | 1 | 1 | 1 | 1 | 1 | 1 | 1 |
| Real Madrid | 4 | 6 | 3 | 3 | 3 | 2 | 2 | 5 | 3 | 2 | 2 | 2 | 3 | 3 | 3 | 3 | 3 | 2 | 2 | 2 | 2 | 2 | 2 | 2 | 2 | 2 | 2 | 2 | 2 | 2 |
| Levante | 6 | 2 | 2 | 2 | 2 | 6 | 5 | 4 | 5 | 3 | 3 | 3 | 2 | 2 | 2 | 2 | 2 | 3 | 3 | 3 | 3 | 3 | 3 | 3 | 3 | 3 | 3 | 3 | 3 | 3 |
| Atlético Madrid | 2 | 4 | 4 | 4 | 4 | 3 | 4 | 3 | 2 | 4 | 4 | 5 | 4 | 4 | 4 | 4 | 4 | 4 | 4 | 4 | 4 | 4 | 4 | 4 | 4 | 4 | 4 | 4 | 4 | 4 |
| Madrid CFF | 8 | 3 | 6 | 5 | 5 | 4 | 3 | 2 | 4 | 6 | 5 | 4 | 5 | 5 | 5 | 5 | 5 | 5 | 5 | 5 | 5 | 5 | 5 | 5 | 5 | 5 | 5 | 5 | 5 | 5 |
| UDG Tenerife | 13 | 14 | 11 | 10 | 10 | 10 | 11 | 10 | 11 | 10 | 10 | 12 | 11 | 10 | 12 | 8 | 10 | 9 | 9 | 9 | 9 | 9 | 8 | 7 | 6 | 6 | 8 | 7 | 6 | 6 |
| Sevilla | 12 | 15 | 14 | 9 | 9 | 9 | 8 | 8 | 8 | 9 | 9 | 11 | 10 | 12 | 10 | 11 | 8 | 8 | 7 | 7 | 7 | 7 | 7 | 6 | 7 | 7 | 7 | 9 | 8 | 7 |
| Real Sociedad | 5 | 5 | 7 | 8 | 6 | 5 | 6 | 6 | 6 | 5 | 6 | 6 | 6 | 6 | 6 | 6 | 6 | 6 | 8 | 8 | 8 | 8 | 9 | 9 | 9 | 8 | 6 | 6 | 7 | 8 |
| Valencia | 14 | 8 | 8 | 7 | 8 | 7 | 7 | 7 | 7 | 7 | 7 | 7 | 8 | 9 | 7 | 7 | 7 | 7 | 6 | 6 | 6 | 6 | 6 | 8 | 8 | 9 | 9 | 8 | 9 | 9 |
| Athletic Club | 1 | 7 | 12 | 12 | 11 | 14 | 12 | 9 | 10 | 8 | 8 | 9 | 9 | 7 | 8 | 9 | 9 | 10 | 10 | 10 | 10 | 10 | 10 | 10 | 10 | 10 | 10 | 10 | 10 | 10 |
| Levante Las Planas | 7 | 9 | 5 | 6 | 7 | 8 | 9 | 11 | 12 | 13 | 14 | 13 | 13 | 13 | 11 | 12 | 13 | 12 | 12 | 12 | 11 | 11 | 11 | 11 | 13 | 13 | 13 | 12 | 11 | 11 |
| Real Betis | 11 | 11 | 13 | 14 | 14 | 12 | 13 | 13 | 9 | 12 | 12 | 10 | 12 | 11 | 13 | 13 | 14 | 14 | 14 | 13 | 14 | 14 | 15 | 12 | 12 | 11 | 11 | 11 | 12 | 12 |
| Sporting de Huelva | 16 | 10 | 9 | 11 | 12 | 11 | 10 | 12 | 13 | 11 | 11 | 8 | 7 | 8 | 9 | 10 | 11 | 11 | 11 | 11 | 13 | 13 | 14 | 15 | 11 | 12 | 12 | 13 | 13 | 13 |
| Villarreal | 15 | 16 | 10 | 13 | 13 | 13 | 14 | 14 | 14 | 14 | 13 | 14 | 14 | 15 | 15 | 16 | 12 | 13 | 13 | 14 | 12 | 12 | 12 | 13 | 14 | 14 | 14 | 14 | 14 | 14 |
| Alhama | 9 | 12 | 15 | 15 | 16 | 16 | 16 | 16 | 15 | 16 | 16 | 16 | 16 | 16 | 16 | 14 | 15 | 15 | 15 | 15 | 16 | 16 | 13 | 14 | 15 | 15 | 15 | 15 | 15 | 15 |
| Alavés | 10 | 13 | 16 | 16 | 15 | 15 | 15 | 15 | 16 | 15 | 15 | 15 | 15 | 14 | 14 | 15 | 16 | 16 | 16 | 16 | 15 | 15 | 16 | 16 | 16 | 16 | 16 | 16 | 16 | 16 |

| Leader and UEFA Champions League group stage |
| UEFA Champions League second round |
| UEFA Champions League first round |
| Relegation to Primera Federación |
| Relegation to Primera Federación |

Source: Liga F

== Season Statistics ==
=== Goalscorers ===
| Rank | Player | Team | Goals |
|---|---|---|---|
| 1 | (Spain) Alba Redondo | Levante | 28 |
| 2 | (Zambia) Racheal Kundananji | Madrid CFF | 25 |
| 3 | (Nigeria) Asisat Oshoala | Barcelona | 21 |
| 4 | (Scotland) Caroline Weir | Real Madrid | 19 |
| 5 | (Spain) Esther González | Real Madrid | 16 |
| 6 | (Colombia) Mayra Ramírez | Levante | 14 |
| 7 | (Spain) Sheila Guijarro | Villarreal | 13 |
| 8 | (Spain) Amaiur Sarriegi | Real Sociedad | 12 |
| 8 | (Spain) Irina Uribe | Levante Las Planas | 12 |
| 8 | (Spain) Cristina Martín-Prieto | Sevilla | 12 |

=== Assists ===
| Rank | Player | Team | Assists |
|---|---|---|---|
| 1 | (Spain) Nerea Eizagirre | Real Sociedad | 12 |
| 1 | (Scotland) Caroline Weir | Real Madrid | 12 |
| 3 | (Colombia) Mayra Ramírez | Levante | 11 |
| 4 | (Spain) Aitana Bonmatí | Barcelona | 10 |
| 5 | (North Macedonia) Nataša Andonova | Levante | 9 |
| 6 | (Spain) Clàudia Pina | Barcelona | 8 |
| 6 | (Sweden) Fridolina Rolfö | Barcelona | 8 |
| 6 | (Spain) Patricia Guijarro | Barcelona | 8 |
| 9 | (Spain) Aida Esteve | Madrid CFF | 7 |
| 9 | (Switzerland) Ana-Maria Crnogorčević | Barcelona | 7 |

=== Hat-tricks ===
| Player | For | Against | Result | Date | Round |
|---|---|---|---|---|---|
| (Nigeria) Rasheedat Ajibade^{4} | Atlético Madrid | Sporting de Huelva | 5–0 (H) | 15 October 2022 | 5 |
| (Spain) Ana Franco | Sevilla | Villarreal | 5–0 (A) | 16 October 2022 | 5 |
| (Spain) Esther González | Real Madrid | Alavés | 7–1 (H) | 16 October 2022 | 5 |
| (Spain) Alba Redondo | Levante | Real Betis | 7–0 (A) | 4 December 2022 | 11 |
| (Spain) Júlia Aguado | Levante | Real Betis | 7–0 (A) | 4 December 2022 | 11 |
| (Nigeria) Asisat Oshoala | Barcelona | Levante Las Planas | 7–0 (H) | 25 January 2023 | 16 |
| (Nigeria) Asisat Oshoala | Barcelona | Granadilla Tenerife | 6–0 (A) | 29 January 2023 | 17 |
| (Scotland) Caroline Weir | Real Madrid | Valencia | 6–1 (A) | 4 February 2023 | 18 |
| (Nigeria) Asisat Oshoala | Barcelona | Real Betis | 7–0 (H) | 5 February 2023 | 18 |
| (Norway) Caroline Graham Hansen | Barcelona | Villarreal | 5–0 (H) | 5 March 2023 | 20 |
| (Spain) Alba Redondo | Levante | Real Sociedad | 4–1 (H) | 26 March 2023 | 23 |
| (Zambia) Racheal Kundananji | Madrid CFF | Alhama | 6–2 (H) | 6 May 2023 | 28 |

^{4} – Player scored four goals.

=== Clean sheets ===
| Rank | Player | Club | Clean sheets |
|---|---|---|---|
| 1 | (Spain) Sandra Paños | Barcelona | 13 |
| 2 | (Spain) Misa Rodríguez | Real Madrid | 10 |
| 3 | (Spain) Paola Ulloa | Madrid CFF | 9 |
| 4 | (Spain) Esther Sullastres | Sevilla | 8 |
| 5 | (Spain) Gemma Font | Barcelona | 7 |
| 5 | (Spain) Enith Salón | Valencia | 7 |
| 5 | (Spain) Lola Gallardo | Atlético Madrid | 7 |
| 5 | (Spain) Andrea Tarazona | Levante | 7 |
| 9 | (Switzerland) Gaëlle Thalmann | Real Betis | 6 |
| 10 | (Spain) Laura Martinez | Alhama | 5 |
| 10 | (Spain) Mariasun Quiñones | Athletic Club | 5 |
| 10 | (England) Chelsea Ashurst | Sporting de Huelva | 5 |

=== Scoring ===
- First goal of the season:
  (Spain) Lucía Pardo for Madrid CFF against Deportivo Alavés (17 September 2022)
- Last goal of the season:
  (Switzerland) Gaëlle Thalmann own goal for Levante against her own team Real Betis (21 May 2023)

=== Discipline ===
Player

- Most yellow cards: 12
  - Núria Garrote (Levante Las Planas)
- Most red cards: 1
  - Diana Gomes (Sevilla)
  - Klára Cahynová (Sevilla)
  - Tere (Sevilla)
  - Rosa Otermín (Sevilla)
  - Morgane Nicoli (Sevilla)
  - Nazareth Martín (Sevilla)
  - Patri Gavira (UDG Tenerife)
  - Thaís Ferreira (UDG Tenerife)
  - Natalia Ramos (UDG Tenerife)
  - Lidia Sánchez (Real Betis)
  - Violeta García Quiles (Real Betis)
  - Ana Tejada (Real Sociedad)
  - Ana González (Madrid CFF)
  - Lena Pérez (Alhama CF)
  - Zaira Flores (Alhama CF)
  - Olivia Oprea (Alhama CF)
  - Jade Boho (Alhama CF)
  - Núria Garrote (Levante Las Planas)
  - Nerea Gantxegi (Levante Las Planas)
  - Paola Soldevila (Villarreal)
  - Bicho (Villarreal)
  - Irene Miguélez (Villarreal)
  - Chelsea Ashurst (Sporting de Huelva)
  - Sandra Castelló (Sporting de Huelva)
  - Athena Kühn (Sporting de Huelva)
  - Raiderlin Carrasco (Sporting de Huelva)
  - Emmanuella Aby (Deportivo Alavés)
  - Maite Zubieta (Athletic Club)

Team

- Most yellow cards: 61
  - Levante Las Planas
- Most red cards: 6
  - Sevilla

== Number of teams by autonomous community ==
| Rank | Autonomous Community | Number | Teams |
|---|---|---|---|
| 1 | Andalusia | 3 | Betis, Sevilla, and Sporting de Huelva |
| 1 | (Basque Country (autonomous community)) Basque Country | 3 | Alavés, Athletic Bilbao, and Real Sociedad |
| 1 | Community of Madrid | 3 | Atlético Madrid, Madrid CFF, and Real Madrid |
| 1 | Valencian Community | 3 | Levante, Valencia and Villarreal |
| 5 | Catalonia | 2 | Barcelona, Levante Las Planas |
| 6 | Canary Islands | 1 | Granadilla |
| 6 | (Region of Murcia) Murcia | 1 | Alhama |
