= Gey =

Gey can refer to:

- Alteration of gay, or being homosexual
- Gey (surname)
- Gēy, capital city of Harari Region, Ethiopia
- Gey language, extinct Adamawa language of Cameroon
- Enya language (ISO 639: gey), Bantu language of the Democratic Republic of the Congo

== See also ==
- Gay (disambiguation)
