= Manterola =

Manterola is a surname. Notable people with the surname include:

- Ainara Manterola (born 1995), Spanish footballer
- Javier Manterola (born 1936), Spanish civil engineer
- José Manterola (1849–1884), Basque writer
- Patricia Manterola (born 1972), Mexican singer, actress, model and fashion designer
