= Sandra García =

Spanish footballer

Personal information
- Full name: Sandra García Giraldez
- Date of birth: 11 February 1986 (age 40)
- Place of birth: San Juan del Puerto, Spain
- Height: 1.86 m (6 ft 1 in)
- Position: Defender

Senior career*
Years	Team	Apps	(Gls)
2001–2006	Estudiantes Huelva		
2006–2007	Sevilla FC		
2007–2016	Sporting de Huelva		
2017	Sporting Plaza de Argel		
2017–2018	Sporting de Huelva	11	(0)
- * Club domestic league appearances and goals

Sandra García Giraldez (born 11 February 1986) is a retired Spanish football defender, who played her career mainly at Sporting Huelva in Spain's Primera División. She previously played for Estudiantes Huelva, Sevilla FC and Sporting Plaza de Argel.

== Personal life ==
Born in San Juan del Puerto, García practised athletics as well as football. She participated in high jump, shot put and the 4x80 relay. She has several tattoos, including the names of her parents, uncles, cousins and an image of the Copa de la Reina de Fútbol trophy.

== Career ==
In her hometown, prior to joining Estudiantes Huelva, she was the only female footballer on the team. Throughout her career, she was the tallest player in the Primera División and so earned the nickname 'Larga'. García played over 200 games for Sporting de Huelva in her career and won the 2015 Copa de la Reina de Fútbol with the club. In November 2016, her departure from Sporting de Huelva was announced; the club stated that her contract would come to an end in June 2017 but was terminated early. The departure was for personal reasons. After fifteen years of playing in the top tier, she signed a contract with Sporting Plaza de Argel in Alicante, who were playing in the second tier, the Segunda División. Next season, however, she rejoined Sporting de Huelva. The following season García retired from football due to injuries. She had required an operation on her Achilles tendon during that same season. Sporting de Huelva paid tribute to her on 21 December 2019; she received an ovation from the fans, coaching staff and teammates and was handed a commemorative number 4 replica shirt by the club in a ceremony prior to a football match.
