= Sara Serrat =

Spanish footballer (born 1995)

Sarita Serrat
Personal information
- Full name: Sara Serrat Reyes
- Date of birth: 15 September 1995 (age 31)
- Place of birth: Huelva, Spain
- Height: 1.69 m (5 ft 7 in)
- Position: Goalkeeper

Youth career
- Sporting Huelva

Senior career*
Years	Team	Apps	(Gls)
2008–2010	Sporting Huelva B		
2010–2019	Sporting Huelva	67+	(0+)
2019–2021	Sevilla	2	(0)
2021-2023	CDE Racing Féminas		
- Real Oviedo femenino

International career
2014	Spain U19	7	(0)
2019–	Spain	1	(0)
- * Club domestic league appearances and goals

Sara Serrat Reyes (born 15 September 1995) is a Spanish ex-footballer who played as a goalkeeper.

== Club career ==
Sara left her longtime club Sporting de Huelva in 2019.

== International career ==
Sara was included in the Spain's provisional squad for the 2015 FIFA Women's World Cup. She played her first match in 2019.

== Honours ==
- Copa de la Reina de Fútbol: 2015
