= María Pry =

Spanish football manager (born 1984)

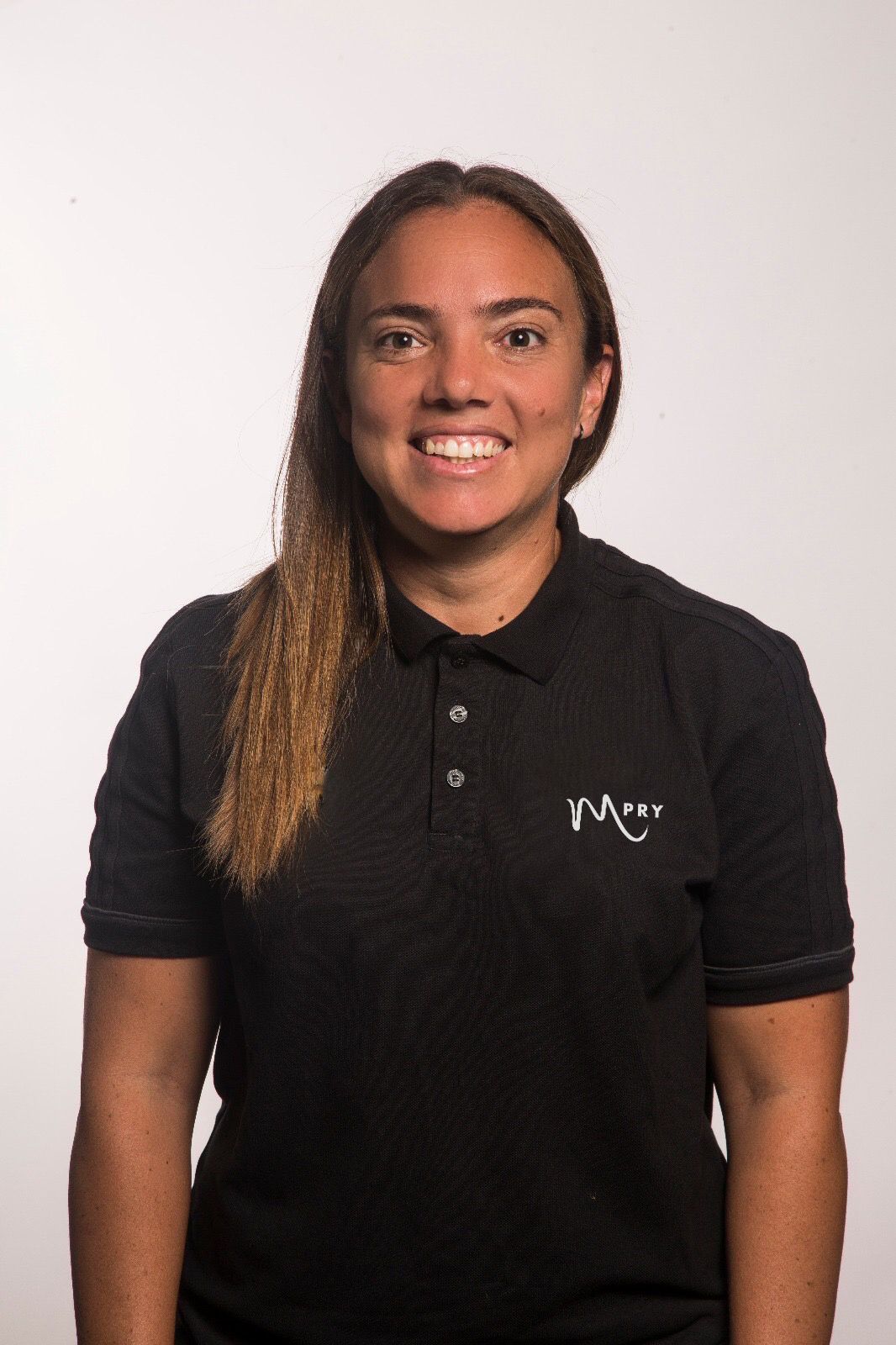

Personal information
- Full name: María del Mar Fernández Montero
- Date of birth: 28 September 1984 (age 42)
- Place of birth: Spain

Managerial career
- Years: Team
- 2009–2012: Sevilla
- 2012–2019: Real Betis
- 2019–2021: Levante
- 2021: Santiago Morning
- 2022–2023: Madrid CFF

María del Mar Fernández Montero (born 28 September 1984) is a Spanish football manager and former player who manages Madrid CFF.

== Career ==
Pry has managed in Chile and Spain.
