= Renata Capobianco =

Brazilian association football player

Personal information
- Date of birth: 8 September 1978 (age 48)
- Place of birth: São Paulo, Brazil
- Position: Defender

Renata Capobianco is a Brazilian football player who played for Sporting de Huelva.
