= Gey (surname) =

Gey is a surname. Notable people with this surname include:

- Cristina Gey (born 1998), Spanish footballer
- George Otto Gey, American scientist
- Jesse Gey, American field hockey player
- Konstantin Gey, Soviet revolutionary and politician
- Leonhard Gey, German painter and art professor
- Matthias Gey, German fencer
- Steven Gey, Florida State University law professor
