= Ana Carol =

Brazilian association football player

Personal information
- Full name: Ana Carolina Días de Almeida Sampaio
- Date of birth: 21 August 1990 (age 36)
- Place of birth: Rio de Janeiro, Brazil
- Height: 1.73 m (5 ft 8 in)
- Position: Defender

Team information
- Current team: Sporting de Huelva
- Number: 3

Senior career*
Years	Team	Apps	(Gls)
2013	Vasco da Gama	0	(0)
2014–2015	Botafogo	11	(0)
2015–2020	Flamengo	38	(3)
2020	Logroño	2	(0)
2020–	Sporting de Huelva	66	(2)
- * Club domestic league appearances and goals

Ana Carolina Días de Almeida Sampaio (born 21 August 1990), better known as Ana Carol, is a Brazilian footballer who plays for Sporting de Huelva.
