= Paula Romero =

Spanish footballer (born 1998)

Personal information
- Full name: Paula Romero Chaparro
- Date of birth: 29 May 1998 (age 28)
- Place of birth: Huelva, Spain
- Height: 1.57 m (5 ft 2 in)
- Position: Defender

Team information
- Current team: Sporting de Huelva
- Number: 19

Senior career*
Years	Team	Apps	(Gls)
2015–2019	Sporting de Huelva	2	(0)
2019–2020	Collerense	8	(0)
2020–	Sporting de Huelva	15	(0)
- * Club domestic league appearances and goals as of 15:31, 9 December 2021 (UTC)

Paula Romero Chaparro (born 29 May 1998) is a Spanish footballer who plays as a defender for Sporting de Huelva.

== Club career ==
Romero started her career at Sporting de Huelva.
