= Gema Soliveres =

Spanish footballer (born 2000)

Personal information
- Full name: Gema Soliveres Cholbi
- Date of birth: 3 November 2000 (age 26)
- Place of birth: Tárbena, Spain
- Height: 1.70 m (5 ft 7 in)
- Position: Midfielder

Team information
- Current team: Levante UD
- Number: 6

Senior career*
Years	Team	Apps	(Gls)
2016–2020	Valencia B	17	(2)
2020–2023	Alavés	71	(5)
2023–2025	Real Betis	47	(1)
2025-	Levante UD	17	(0)
- * Club domestic league appearances and goals as of 13:04, 30 October 2021 (UTC)

Gema Soliveres Cholbi (born 3 November 2000) is a Spanish footballer who plays as a midfielder for Levante UD.

== Club career ==
Soliveres started her career at Valencia B. In 2020, she joined Alavés, and in 2023, Real Betis.
