= Luis Carrión =

Spanish footballer and manager

- Carrión in 2015

Personal information
- Full name: Luis Miguel Carrión Delgado
- Date of birth: 7 February 1979 (age 47)
- Place of birth: Barcelona, Spain
- Height: 1.76 m (5 ft 9 in)
- Position: Right-back

Team information
- Current team: Leganés (manager)

Youth career
- Damm
- Júpiter
- Barcelona

Senior career*
Years	Team	Apps	(Gls)
1997–1999	Barcelona C	53	(1)
1998–2003	Barcelona B	83	(1)
2002–2003	→ Gavà (loan)	36	(2)
2003–2005	Gimnàstic	25	(0)
2006–2007	Córdoba	50	(2)
2007–2008	Terrassa	37	(0)
2008–2009	Melilla	28	(1)
2009–2010	Alavés	27	(0)
2010–2011	Peñarroya	28	(1)
Total		367	(8)

International career
1996	Spain U18	3	(0)

Managerial career
- 2011–2013: Espanyol (women)
- 2013–2015: Córdoba (assistant)
- 2014: Córdoba (interim)
- 2015–2016: Córdoba B
- 2016–2017: Córdoba
- 2018–2019: Melilla
- 2019–2020: Numancia
- 2021–2023: Cartagena
- 2023–2024: Oviedo
- 2024: Las Palmas
- 2025: Oviedo
- 2026–: Leganés
- * Club domestic league appearances and goals

Luis Miguel Carrión Delgado (born 7 February 1979) is a Spanish former professional footballer who played as a right-back. He is currently manager of Segunda División club Leganés.

== Playing career ==
Born in Barcelona, Catalonia, Carrión began his senior career in the C and B teams of Barcelona. He made 24 total Segunda División appearances for the latter and Gimnàstic de Tarragona, and played 262 matches in the Segunda División B for those clubs and five others.

== Coaching career ==
In June 2011, Carrión was appointed manager of the women's team of Espanyol in his hometown. He left two years later, having won the Copa de la Reina de Fútbol in 2012.

Carrión then returned to the men's game and became assistant to Pablo Villa at Córdoba in the second tier. In February 2014, he was made interim when the latter was dismissed, and on the 16th he was on the bench as the side lost 3–0 at Numancia.

In March 2015, Carrión was named coach of Córdoba's reserves in division three. Having suffered relegation to Tercera División and bounced back with promotion, he was then given the job at the first team on 29 November 2016, replacing José Luis Oltra at a side 16th in the standings. The following 16 October, he was himself relieved of his duties.

In June 2018, Carrión was hired at third-tier Melilla, whom he had played for a decade earlier. He took the team from the North African exclave to the playoffs, where they were eliminated by a single goal from Atlético Baleares in the semi-finals.

Carrión moved up a league in the summer of 2019, agreeing to a deal at Numancia. He left the club after their relegation in July 2020, and was appointed at fellow second division side Cartagena on 12 January 2021.

On 1 June 2023, after two consecutive ninth-place finishes, Carrión left the Estadio Cartagonova after rejecting a contract renewal. On 21 September, he replaced Álvaro Cervera at the helm of Real Oviedo also in the second tier, and led them to the final of the promotion play-offs, losing 2–1 on aggregate to his former employers Espanyol.

On 26 June 2024, Carrión left Asturias, and signed a two-year contract with Las Palmas of La Liga later that day. On 8 October, after nine matches without a win – the last being a 1–0 home loss against Celta in spite of playing 40 minutes with two more players – and with his team bottom of the table, he was dismissed.

Carrión returned to Oviedo on 9 October 2025, on a deal until the end of the season. On 14 December, however, and like Veljko Paunović two months before him, he was relieved of his duties.

On 18 October 2026, Carrión was appointed manager of Leganés.

== Managerial statistics ==
As of match played 20 November 2026

Managerial record by team and tenure
Team	Nat.	From	To	Record								Ref
Team	Nat.	From	To	G	W	D	L	GF	GA	GD	Win %	Ref
Córdoba (interim)	(Spain)	9 February 2014	16 February 2014	1	0	0	1	0	3	−3	0.00	
Córdoba B	(Spain)	16 March 2015	30 November 2016	67	37	10	20	117	72	+45	55.22	
Córdoba	(Spain)	30 November 2016	16 October 2017	42	16	7	19	51	64	−13	38.10	
Melilla	(Spain)	1 June 2018	21 June 2019	47	26	10	11	67	45	+22	55.32	
Numancia	(Spain)	21 June 2019	28 August 2020	43	13	12	18	46	54	−8	30.23	
Cartagena	(Spain)	12 January 2021	1 June 2023	111	44	25	42	139	136	+3	39.64	
Oviedo	(Spain)	21 September 2023	26 June 2024	42	20	11	11	59	39	+20	47.62	
Las Palmas	(Spain)	26 June 2024	8 October 2024	9	0	3	6	9	17	−8	0.00	
Oviedo	(Spain)	9 October 2025	14 December 2025	9	0	4	5	5	16	−11	0.00	
Leganés	(Spain)	18 October 2026	present	6	3	1	2	12	10	+2	50.00	
Career total				376	159	82	135	502	453	+49	42.29	—

== Honours ==
Espanyol Feminino

- Copa de la Reina de Fútbol: 2012
