= Vicky Benítez =

Spanish footballer (born 2000)

Personal information
- Full name: Victoria Benítez Rodríguez
- Date of birth: 9 September 2000 (age 26)
- Place of birth: Seville, Spain
- Height: 1.68 m (5 ft 6 in)
- Position: Defender

Team information
- Current team: Real Betis
- Number: 4

Youth career
- 2015–2017: Sevilla

Senior career*
Years	Team	Apps	(Gls)
2017–2019	Sevilla B		
2018–2019	Sevilla	7	(0)
2019	Real Oviedo	4	(0)
2020	Friol	6	(0)
2020–	Real Betis	34	(0)
2021–2022	Real Betis B	5	(0)
- * Club domestic league appearances and goals as of 21:55, 29 January 2023 (UTC)

Victoria Benítez Rodríguez (born 9 September 2000) is a Spanish footballer who plays as a defender for Real Betis.

== Club career ==
Vicky Benítez started her career at Sevilla's academy.
