= 2015 Copa de la Reina de Fútbol =

Tournament details
- Country: Spain
- Teams: 8

Final positions
- Champions: Sporting de Huelva
- Runners-up: Valencia

Tournament statistics
- Matches played: 7
- Goals scored: 25 (3.57 per match)
- Top goal scorer(s): Cristina Martín-Prieto (4 goals)

Awards
- Best player: Cristina Martín-Prieto

The 2015 Copa de la Reina de Fútbol was the 33rd edition of the Spanish women's football national cup. It ran from 10 to 17 May 2015 and it was contested by the best eight teams in the 2014–15 Spanish Championship. Both the quarterfinals were single-elimination in Las Rozas and Torrelodones, while the semifinals and final was held in Melilla.

== Qualification ==
Location of the 2014-15 Copa de la Reina teams

The top eight positions of the 2014–15 Spanish First Division qualified for the cup.

| Pos | 2014 | Team | Pld | W | D | L | GF | GA | GD | Pts |
|---|---|---|---|---|---|---|---|---|---|---|
| 1 | Same position | Barcelona | 30 | 25 | 2 | 3 | 93 | 9 | +84 | 77 |
| 2 | ▲1 | Atlético de Madrid | 30 | 20 | 9 | 1 | 54 | 21 | +33 | 69 |
| 3 | ▼1 | Athletic Club | 30 | 19 | 8 | 3 | 73 | 24 | +49 | 65 |
| 4 | ▲2 | Valencia | 30 | 17 | 8 | 5 | 58 | 25 | +33 | 59 |
| 5 | ▲1 | Levante | 30 | 15 | 10 | 5 | 60 | 25 | +35 | 55 |
| 6 | ▼2 | Rayo Vallecano | 29 | 13 | 7 | 9 | 45 | 34 | +11 | 46 |
| 7 | ▲4 | Espanyol | 30 | 12 | 7 | 11 | 50 | 54 | −4 | 43 |
| 8 | Same position | Sporting de Huelva | 30 | 11 | 8 | 11 | 51 | 55 | −4 | 41 |
| 9 | (N) | Santa Teresa | 30 | 9 | 7 | 14 | 33 | 53 | −20 | 34 |
| 10 | ▲3 | Oviedo Moderno | 30 | 8 | 8 | 14 | 35 | 61 | −26 | 32 |

=== Qualified teams by community ===
| Autonomous community | Team/s |
|---|---|
| Andalusia | Sporting de Huelva |
| Catalonia | Barcelona, Espanyol |
| (Basque Country (autonomous community)) Basque Country | Athletic Club |
| Community of Madrid | Atlético de Madrid, Rayo Vallecano |
| Valencian Community | Valencia, Levante |

== Results ==
=== Bracket ===
Quarterfinals
Espanyol | 1
Atlético de Madrid | 5
Rayo Vallecano | 2
Sporting de Huelva | 4
Valencia | 2
Athletic Club | 1
Barcelona | 4
Levante | 0

Semifinals
Atlético de Madrid | 1 (3)
Sporting de Huelva | 1 (5)
Valencia | 1
Barcelona | 0

Final
Sporting de Huelva | 2
Valencia | 1

2016 Copa de la Reina de Fútbol champion

1st title

=== Quarterfinals ===
10 May 2015
10:00 (CEST)

| Espanyol | 1-5 | Atlético de Madrid |
|---|---|---|
| Mendoza 4' | | Sampedro 29'; Esther 32', 39'; Beltrán 55'; Calderón 81' |

Ciudad del Fútbol, Las Rozas
Referee: Ibañez Gutiérrez
10 May 2015
10:00 (CEST)

| Valencia | 2-1 | Athletic Club |
|---|---|---|
| "Gio" 7'; Vilas 38' | | Arranz 90' |

Estado Municipal Julián Ariza, Torrelodones
Referee: Carralero Calvo
10 May 2015
12:30 (CEST)

| Rayo Vallecano | 2-4 (a.e.t.) | Sporting de Huelva |
|---|---|---|
| Saray 24'; Costa 120' | | Anita 81'; Magalhães 93'; Cristina Martín-Prieto 117', 119' |

Ciudad del Fútbol, Las Rozas
Referee: Muñoz Piedra
10 May 2015
12:30 (CEST)

| Barcelona | 4-0 | Levante |
|---|---|---|
| Bermúdez 22'; Caldentey 74' "Willy" 80'; Hernández 82' |

Estado Municipal Julián Ariza, Torrelodones
Referee: Gil Gozalo

=== Semifinals ===
15 May 2015
12:00 (CEST)

| Atlético de Madrid | 1-1 (a.e.t.) | Sporting de Huelva |
|---|---|---|
| Ángela Sosa 41' | | Gavira 75' |
Penalties
| (penalty scored) Meseguer; (penalty missed) Sampedro; (penalty scored) P.Borja; (penalty scored) Calderón | 3–5 | (penalty scored) Virgy; (penalty scored) Gavira; (penalty scored) Pavel; (penalty scored) Anita; (penalty scored) Magalhães |

Estadio Municipal Álvarez Claro, Melilla
Referee: Mohand Mohand
15 May 2015
18:00 (CEST)

| Valencia | 1-0 | Barcelona |
|---|---|---|
| Férez 37' |

Estadio Municipal Álvarez Claro, Melilla
Referee: Ibáñez Gutiérrez

=== Final ===
17 May 2015
12:00 (CEST)

| Sporting de Huelva | 2-1 | Valencia |
|---|---|---|
| Martín-Prieto 13', 84' | Report | Férez 64' |

Estadio Municipal Álvarez Claro, Melilla
Referee: Samir Amar

Sporting de Huelva
Valencia

| GK | 13 | (Spain) Sara Serrat |
| DF | 3 | (Romania) Elena Pavel | (yellow card) 90' |
| DF | 4 | (Spain) Sandra García |
| DF | 5 | (Spain) Emma Marqués | | (substituted off) 70' |
| DF | 21 | (Spain) Paula Perea |
| MF | 10 | (Spain) Virgy | | (substituted off) 88' |
| MF | 14 | (Spain) Patri Gavira | (yellow card) 86' |
| MF | 16 | (Spain) Sandra Castelló |
| MF | 8 | (Brazil) Joyce Magalhães | (yellow card) 45' | (substituted off) 91' |
| FW | 7 | (Spain) Anita | (yellow card) 60' |
| FW | 9 | (Spain) Cristina Martín-Prieto |
Substitutes:
| GK | 1 | (Spain) Nazaret Lara |
| MF | 19 | (Spain) Jenny Benítez | | (substituted on) 70' |
| FW | 18 | (Spain) Andrea Garrido | | (substituted on) 88' |
| DF | 6 | (Spain) Maite Albarrán | | (substituted on) 91' |
| MF | 11 | (Spain) Esperanza Carrasco |
| MF | 12 | (Spain) Rocío Pizarro |
Manager:
(Spain) Antonio Toledo

| GK | 1 | (Spain) Mariajo |
| DF | 3 | (Spain) Mulán |
| DF | 5 | (Spain) Ivana Andrés |
| DF | 19 | (Spain) Paula Nicart |
| DF | 15 | (Spain) Leila Ouahabi |
| MF | 21 | (Japan) Mitsue Iwakura | (substituted off) 54' |
| MF | 20 | (Spain) Gio Carreras |
| MF | 17 | (Spain) Sara Monforte | (substituted off) 79' |
| MF | 18 | (Spain) Naiara Beristain |
| FW | 14 | (Spain) Carol Férez |
| FW | 9 | (Spain) Mari Paz |
Substitutes:
| GK | 13 | (Spain) Gema Rueda |
| DF | 4 | (Spain) Salomé Navalón |
| DF | 6 | (Spain) Cintia Montagut |
| MF | 7 | (Spain) Trueno |
| MF | 8 | (Spain) Paula Arnal |
| MF | 10 | (Spain) Anita | (substituted on) 79' |
| FW | 12 | (Spain) Manu Lareo | (substituted on) 54' |
Manager:
(Argentina) Cristian Toro

=== Goalscorers ===
4 goals:

- Cristina Martín-Prieto (Sporting de Huelva)

2 goals:

- Carolina Férez (Valencia)
- Esther González (Atlético de Madrid)

1 goal:

- Joana Arranz (Athletic Club)
- Beatriz Beltrán (Atlético de Madrid)
- Nagore Calderón (Atlético de Madrid)
- Amanda Sampedro (Atlético de Madrid)
- Ángela Sosa (Atlético de Madrid)
- Sonia Bermúdez (Barcelona)
- Mariona Caldentey (Barcelona)
- Sandra Hernández (Barcelona)
- Ana Romero "Willy" (Barcelona)
- Núria Mendoza (Espanyol)
- Marta García "Costa" (Rayo Vallecano)
- Saray García (Rayo Vallecano)
- Anita Hernández (Sporting de Huelva)
- Patricia Gaviria (Sporting de Huelva)
- Joyce Magalhães (Sporting de Huelva)
- Georgina Carreras "Gio" (Valencia)
- María Paz Vilas (Valencia)
