= Cristina Gey =

Spanish footballer (born 1998)

Personal information
- Full name: Cristina Gey Rondón
- Date of birth: 13 December 1998 (age 27)
- Place of birth: Isla Cristina, Spain
- Height: 1.62 m (5 ft 4 in)
- Position: Forward

Team information
- Current team: Real Murcia CF
- Number: 21

Senior career*
| Years | Team | Apps | (Gls) |
| 2016–2017 | Punta del Caimán | | |
| 2017–2020 | Sporting de Huelva B | | |
| 2020–2023 | Sporting de Huelva | 42 | (2) |
| 2023 | → Dux Logroño (loan) | 8 | (1) |
| 2024–2025 | Real Murcia CF | | |
- * Club domestic league appearances and goals as of 10:03, 10 June 2023 (UTC)

Cristina Gey Rondón (born 13 December 1998) is a Spanish footballer who plays as a forward for Real Murcia CF.

== Club career ==
Gey started her career at Punta del Caimán. She was promoted from the academy to the first team for Sporting de Huelva in July 2020. Following the signings of Therese Simonsson and Berglind Rós Ágústsdóttir, Gey found it difficult to make appearances for Sporting de Huelva so was loaned out to Dux Logroño from 1 February 2023 until the end of the season.
