= Itsaso Nabaskues =

Spanish footballer (born 1990)

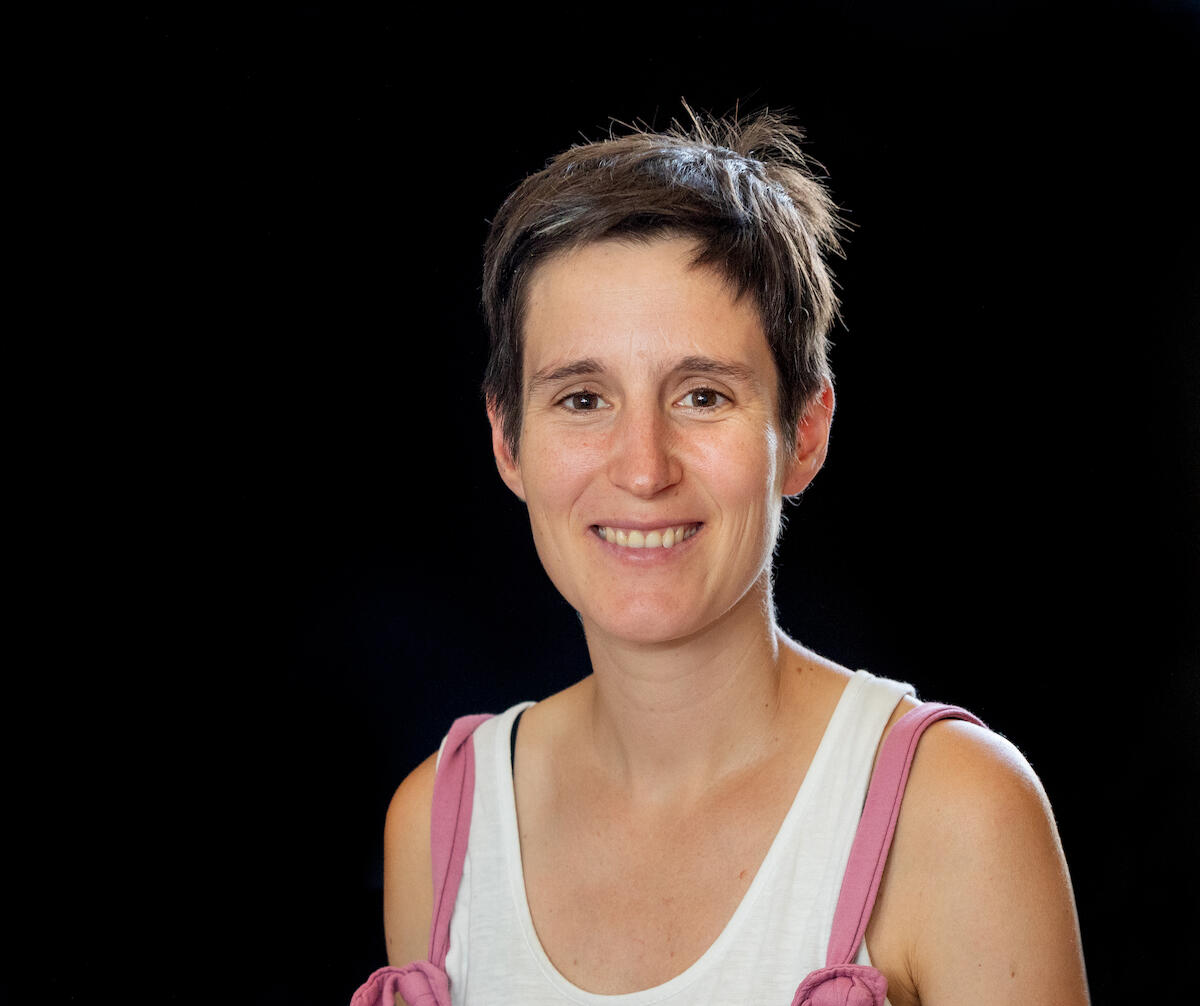

Personal information
- Full name: Itsaso Nabaskues Lasheras
- Date of birth: 6 October 1990 (age 36)
- Place of birth: San Sebastián, Spain
- Height: 1.63 m (5 ft 4 in)
- Position: Midfielder

Team information
- Current team: Oiartzun KE
- Number: 18

Senior career*
Years	Team	Apps	(Gls)
2004–2006	Añorga KKE		
2006–2008	Real Sociedad	49	(4)
2008–2012	Athletic Bilbao	108	(12)
2013–2014	Oud-Heverlee Leuven	1	(0)
2014–	Oiartzun KE		

International career
- Spain U19
2015–	Basque Country	1	(0)
- * Club domestic league appearances and goals

Itsaso Nabaskues Lasheras (born 6 October 1990) is a Spanish football midfielder, who plays for Oiartzun KE of Spain's Primera División. She previously played for Real Sociedad and Athletic Club.

She played at the 2007 U-19 European Championship.

In May 2016 Nabaskues suffered a serious knee injury while playing for Oiartzun against FC Barcelona. She was frustrated at having to wait until the following October for her surgery.
