= María Jiménez (footballer) =

Spanish footballer (born 2000)

Personal information
- Full name: María José Jiménez Gutiérrez
- Date of birth: 17 September 2000 (age 26)
- Place of birth: Alicante, Spain
- Position: Defender

Team information
- Current team: Real Betis
- Number: 4

Senior career*
Years	Team	Apps	(Gls)
2014–2016	Sporting Plaza Argel B		
2015–2016	Sporting Plaza Argel		
2016–2017	Elche		
2017–2019	Levante	0	(0)
2019–2020	Valencia B	8	(0)
2019–2023	Valencia	32	(0)
2023–	Real Betis		

International career
- Spain U19
Medal record
Representing Spain
UEFA Women's Under-19 Championship
First place	2018 Switzerland
- * Club domestic league appearances and goals as of 20:19, 7 December 2021 (UTC)

María José Jiménez Gutiérrez (born 17 September 2000) is a Spanish professional footballer who plays as a defender for Real Betis. She started her career at Sporting Plaza Argel B in 2014.
