= Esther Martín-Pozuelo =

Spanish footballer (born 1998)

Personal information
- Full name: Esther Martín-Pozuelo Aranda
- Date of birth: 8 October 1998 (age 28)
- Place of birth: Daimiel, Spain
- Position: Defender

Team information
- Current team: Real Betis
- Number: 15

Senior career*
| Years | Team | Apps | (Gls) |
| 2013–2015 | Daimiel | | |
| 2015–2017 | La Solana | | |
| 2017–2020 | CD Tacón | 13+ | (1+) |
| 2020–2022 | Valencia | 40 | (1) |
| 2022–2023 | Levante Las Planas | 1 | (0) |
| 2023–2024 | Granada CF | | |
| 2024– | Real Betis | | |
- * Club domestic league appearances and goals as of 20:41, 7 December 2021 (UTC)

Esther Martín-Pozuelo Aranda (born 8 October 1998) is a Spanish footballer who plays as a defender for Real Betis.

== Club career ==
Martín-Pozuelo started her career at Daimiel.
