= José Muñoz (sports manager) =

Spanish footballer and sports manager (1940–2016)

José Muñoz Lozano
Personal information
- Full name: José Antonio Muñoz Lozano
- Date of birth: c. 1940
- Place of birth: Huelva, Andalusia, Spain
- Date of death: 2 August 2016 (aged 76)
- Place of death: Huelva, Andalusia, Spain

Youth career
- Years: Team
- 1952–1954: Modest Huelva clubs

Managerial career
- Ibáñez Hermanos
- 1975–1979: Recreativo de Huelva (youth)
President of Recreativo de Huelva
In office 1979–1984
Preceded by	Francisco de la Corte
Succeeded by	José Antonio Mancheño
President of Cajasol Sporting Huelva Foundation
In office 2006–2013

José Antonio Muñoz Lozano (c. 1940 – 2 August 2016) was a Spanish businessman, footballer, and sports manager who served as president for the two main clubs in Huelva, Recreativo de Huelva (1979–1984) and Cajasol Sporting Huelva Foundation (2006–13). He was noted for his promotion of local and youth players from the Huelva sports academy.

== Biography ==
Born in Huelva, Muñoz Lozano began playing football in modest teams based in his hometown, but when he finished his youth years, he stopped to dedicate himself to being a manager, starting by founding the youth club Ibáñez Hermanos, of which he was the manager for four years. He also collaborated with several clubs in the province of Huelva, especially those at the grassroots level. For instance, he was part of the boards of directors of Ibáñez Hermanos, Santa Marta, and La Orden. From there, he joined the ranks of Recreativo de Huelva, where he started as a coach in the club's youth system, where he worked with, among others, the Zambrano brothers (Antonio and Manolo), Andrés, and Joaquín.

After four years as a youth coach, Muñoz Lozano spent another five as president of the senior club, from 1979 to 1984, which at that time was playing in the Segunda División. In 1979, he replaced Francisco de la Corte as the new president of the club, hold this position until 1984, when he was replaced by José Antonio Mancheño. His tenure was characterized by giving significant promotion to youth and local players, who had a notable presence on the first team. During that time he also held the position of sports vice-president of the Andalusian Football Federation for two years.

In 2006, almost two decades after his last leadership position, the 63-year-old Muñoz Lozano was appointed as the president of Cajasol Sporting Huelva Foundation in the top national category of women's football, and under his leadership, the club achieved promotion. In 2011, the club's limited budget meant that they had to do a lot of juggling to survive, stating that "it is a miracle that we are still financially in the competition". He held the presidency of Sporting for seven years, until 2013, when he resigned due to personal and health reasons, stating that he had a chronic illness and that he "should have had an operation", having already postponed it twice. He also explained that he was "tired of knocking on many doors and not finding an answer".

Outside football, Muñoz Lozano was also a businessman of recognized prestige in the capital of Huelva, mainly "thanks to his perseverance and ability to make the most opportune decisions at the most critical moments".

== Death ==
Muñoz Lozano died in Huelva on 2 August 2016, at the age of 76. Following his death, Manuela Romero, the then president of Sporting, stated that "he was a person with character and very detail-oriented", who stressed that "people will always" be grateful for "what he contributed to the club". On the following day, he was buried at the New Funeral Home in Huelva.
