= Paula Guerrero =

Spanish footballer (born 1996)

Personal information
- Full name: Paula Guerrero Sanz
- Date of birth: 20 September 1996 (age 30)
- Place of birth: Valencia, Spain
- Height: 1.60 m (5 ft 3 in)
- Position: Midfielder

Team information
- Current team: Villarreal CF
- Number: 16

Senior career*
| Years | Team | Apps | (Gls) |
| 2011–2014 | Levante B | | |
| 2012–2016 | Levante | 61 | (0) |
| 2016–2019 | Ball State Cardinals | | |
| 2019–2023 | Valencia | 43 | (0) |
| 2023-2024 | Mynavi Sendai | 1 | (0) |
| 2024- | Villarreal CF | | |
- * Club domestic league appearances and goals as of 12:23, 7 December 2021 (UTC)

Paula Guerrero Sanz (born 20 September 1996) is a Spanish footballer who plays as a midfielder for in Primera Federación club Villarreal CF.

== Club career ==
Guerrero started her career at Levante B.
