= Andere Leguina =

Spanish footballer (born 1989)

Personal information
- Full name: Andere Leguina García
- Date of birth: 17 March 1989 (age 37)
- Place of birth: Getxo, Spain
- Height: 1.63 m (5 ft 4 in)
- Position: Goalkeeper

Senior career*
Years	Team	Apps	(Gls)
2002–2003	SD Leioa		
2003–2006	Athletic Bilbao B		
2006–2012	Athletic Bilbao	33	(0)
2012–2015	San Ignacio		
2015–2016	Madrid CFF		
2016–2021	Athletic Bilbao	10	(0)
- * Club domestic league appearances and goals

Andere Leguina García (born 17 March 1989), occasionally referred to as Andere Legina, is a Spanish former footballer who played as a goalkeeper, mainly for Primera División club Athletic Bilbao.

She represented Spain in the 2007 Under-19 European Championship.

== Career ==
Leguina first joined Athletic Bilbao at the age of 14. In her two spells at Athletic Bilbao, she was predominantly backup goalkeeper to Ainhoa Tirapu. Following Tirapu's retirement in 2020, Leguina renewed her contract with Athletic Bilbao for a further year.

== Personal life ==
Leguina is from Getxo. Outside of her football career, she works as an engineer for Kyndryl.

== Honours ==
Athletic Bilbao

- Primera División: 2003–04, 2006–07
