= Cristina Martín-Prieto =

Spanish footballer (born 1993)

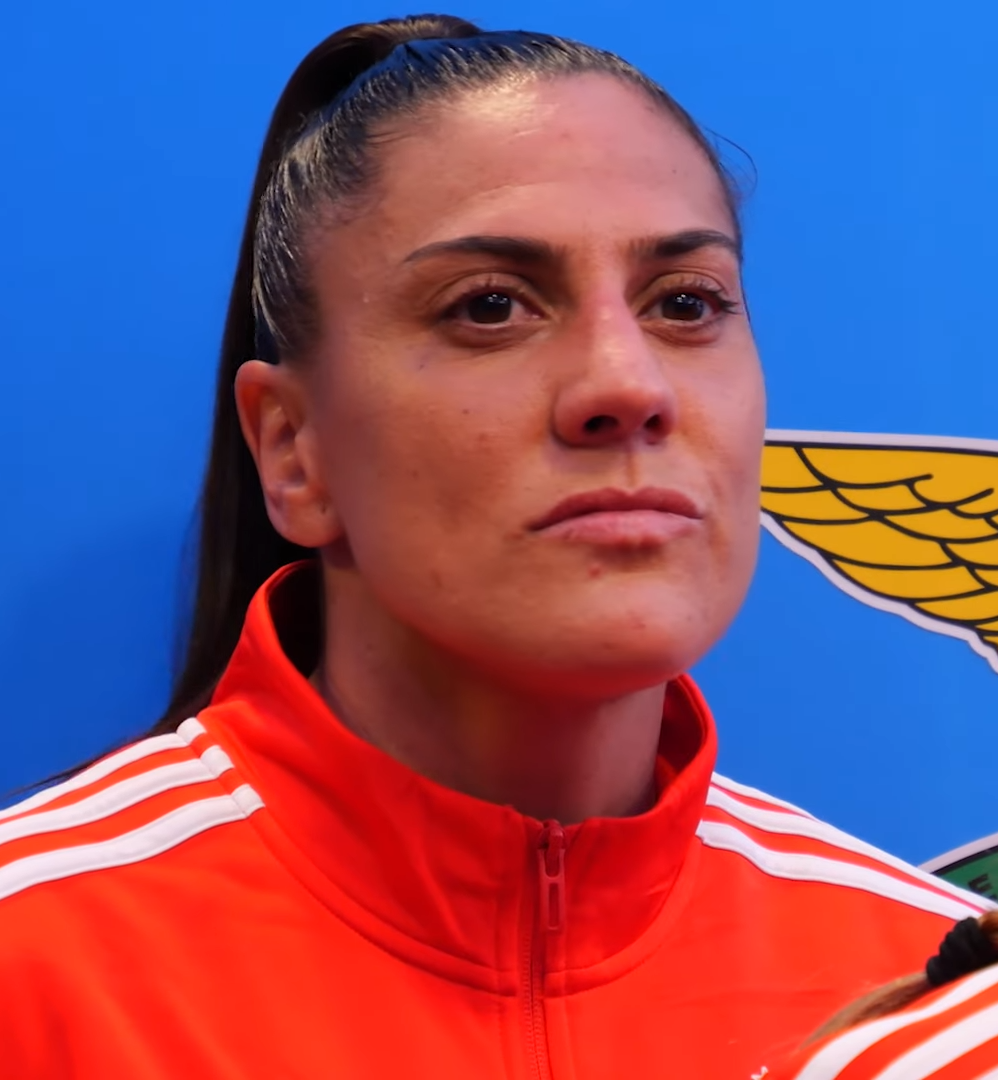
- Martín-Prieto with Benfica in 2025

Personal information
- Full name: Cristina Martín-Prieto Gutiérrez
- Date of birth: 14 March 1993 (age 33)
- Place of birth: Seville, Spain
- Height: 1.73 m (5 ft 8 in)
- Position: Forward

Team information
- Current team: Galatasaray
- Number: 9

Senior career*
Years	Team	Apps	(Gls)
2007–2008	Peña Rociera		
2008–2013	Sevilla	13	(5)
2013–2017	Sporting de Huelva	22	(7)
2017–2022	Granadilla	139	(48)
2022–2024	Sevilla	59	(29)
2024–2026	Benfica	34	(20)
2026–	Galatasaray	11	(17)

International career^{‡}
2024–2025	Spain	6	(3)
Medal record
Women's football
Representing Spain
UEFA Women's Championship
Runner-up	2025 Switzerland
- * Club domestic league appearances and goals as of 10 July 2026 ‡ National team caps and goals as of 3 July 2025

Cristina Martín-Prieto Gutiérrez (born 14 March 1993) is a Spanish professional footballer who plays as a forward for Turkish Women's Football Super League club Galatasaray and the Spain national team.

Described as a "late bloomer", Martín-Prieto won the league's best player and league top goalscorer award during the 2024–25 Campeonato Nacional Feminino.

== Club career ==
Martín-Prieto started her career at Peña Rociera. Whilst at Sporting de Huelva, she won the 2015 Queen's Cup and scored 12 goals during the 2016–17 season.

During her time at Granadilla, Martín-Prieto had to balance football with working in a retail store.

On 1 July 2022, Martín-Prieto was announced at Sevilla on a two year contract. Before the derby between Sevilla and Real Betis, she took part in a beer-pouring derby against Borja Iglesias. Before the 2023 season, Martín-Prieto was described as "an essential part of Sevilla FC", scoring 12 goals, assisting twice and playing "every league matchday" during the 2022–23 Liga F season.

On 3 July 2024, Martín-Prieto was announced at Benfica on a two year contract. During her first season, she scored 19 goals, becoming the league's top goalscorer. She also won the league's best player award.

On 10 July 2026, it was announced that Martín-Prieto had signed a contract with the Turkish Women's Football Super League club Galatasaray and would wear the number 9 shirt.

== International career ==
On 25 October 2024, Martín-Prieto scored on her Spain international debut against Canada.

On 21 February 2025, Martín-Prieto scored a last minute winning goal against Belgium in the 2025 UEFA Women's Nations League, completing a 3–2 comeback.

On 10 June 2025, Martín-Prieto was called up to the Spain squad for the UEFA Women's Euro 2025. On 3 July 2025, she scored against Portugal in the 93rd minute to seal a 5–0 victory.

== International goals ==
No.	Date	Venue	Opponent	Score	Result	Competition
1.	25 October 2024	Estadio Francisco de la Hera, Almendralejo, Spain	Canada	1–1	1–1	Friendly
2.	21 February 2025	Estadi Ciutat de València, Valencia, Spain	Belgium	3–2	3–2	2025 UEFA Women's Nations League
3.	3 July 2025	Stadion Wankdorf, Bern, Switzerland	Portugal	5–0	5–0	UEFA Women's Euro 2025

== Honours ==
Sporting de Huelva

- Copa de la Reina: 2015

Benfica

- Campeonato Nacional Feminino: 2024–25
- Taça da Liga: 2024–25

Spain

- UEFA Women's Championship runner-up: 2025

Individual

- Copa de la Reina best player: 2015
- Copa de la Reina top scorer: 2015
