= Berglind Rós Ágústsdóttir =

Icelandic footballer (born 1995)

Personal information
- Date of birth: 28 July 1995 (age 31)
- Place of birth: Reykjavík, Iceland
- Position: Defender

Team information
- Current team: Valur
- Number: 22

Senior career*
Years	Team	Apps	(Gls)
2011–2014	Valur	14	(0)
2014	Afturelding	5	(0)
2014–2016	Valur	18	(1)
2017–2020	Fylkir	50	(2)
2021–2022	KIF Örebro	48	(5)
2023	Sporting de Huelva	13	(1)
2023–	Valur	24	(5)

International career^{‡}
2018	Iceland U17	6	(1)
2019–2020	Iceland U19	2	(0)
2021–	Iceland	12	(1)
- * Club domestic league appearances and goals as of 27 March 2023 ‡ National team caps and goals as of 13 July 2021

Berglind Rós Ágústsdóttir (born 28 July 1995) is an Icelandic professional footballer who plays as a defender for Valur and the Iceland women's national team.

== Club career ==
Berglind Rós was the captain of Fylkir in 2020. On 18 December 2020, it was announced that Berglind Rós had signed a professional contract for Örebro in the Damallsvenskan.

== International career ==
Berglind Rós has been capped for the Iceland national team.

On 13 June 2025, Berglind Rós was called up to the Iceland squad for the UEFA Women's Euro 2025.

== Career statistics ==
No.	Date	Venue	Opponent	Score	Result	Competition
1.	14 July 2023	Laugardalsvöllur, Reykjavík, Iceland	Finland	1–2	1–2	Friendly
