= Andrea Falcón =

Spanish footballer (born 1997)

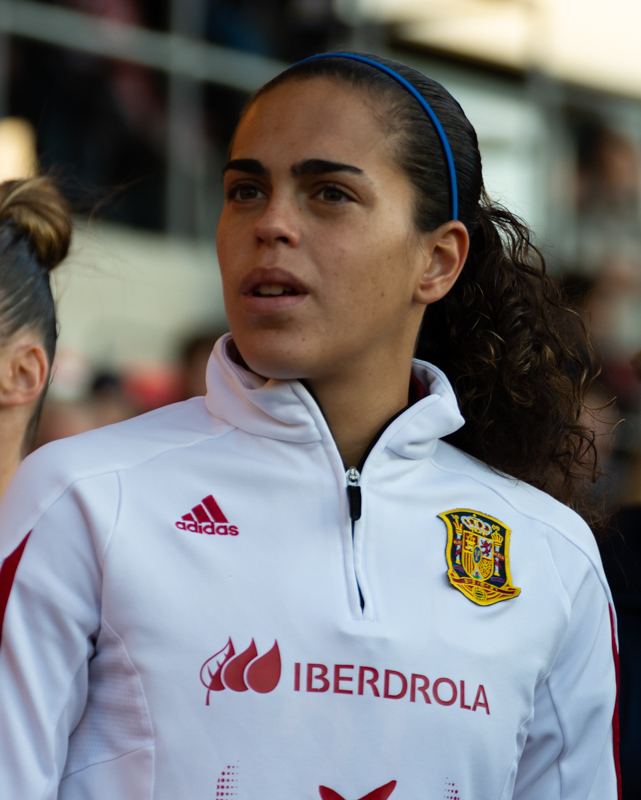
- Falcón representing Spain in 2018

Personal information
- Full name: Andrea Sánchez Falcón
- Date of birth: 28 February 1997 (age 29)
- Place of birth: Arucas, Spain
- Height: 1.72 m (5 ft 8 in)
- Position: Left attacking midfielder

Youth career
- Unión Viera

Senior career*
Years	Team	Apps	(Gls)
2012–2013	Barcelona B		
2013–2016	Barcelona	11	(0)
2016–2019	Atlético Madrid	51	(5)
2019–2022	Barcelona	16	(0)
2022	→ Levante (loan)	13	(3)
2022–2023	América	17	(2)
2023–2026	Benfica	16	(4)

International career^{‡}
2013–2015	Spain U17	21	(10)
2014–2016	Spain U19	22–	(11)
2016	Spain U20	4	(0)
2017–2022	Spain	12	(1)
- * Club domestic league appearances and goals as of 12 May 2024 ‡ National team caps and goals as of 25 October 2020

Andrea Sánchez Falcón (born 28 February 1997) is a Spanish former professional footballer who played as a midfielder. She previously played for Barcelona in Spain's Primera División.

== International career ==
=== International goals ===
Andrea Falcón – goals for Spain
#	Date	Venue	Opponent	Score	Result	Competition
1.	8 November 2018	Butarque, Leganés	Poland	1–0	3–1	Friendly

== Honours ==
FC Barcelona

- Primera División: 2013–14, 2014–15, 2016–17, 2017–18, 2018–19, 2019–20, 2020–21, 2021–22
- UEFA Women's Champions League: 2020–21
- Copa de la Reina de Fútbol: 2014, 2019–20, 2020–21
- Supercopa de España Femenina: 2019–20, 2021–22
- Copa Catalunya: 2014, 2015

Atlético Madrid

- Primera División: 2016–17, 2017–18

Club América

- Liga MX Femenil: Clausura 2023

Benfica

- Campeonato Nacional: 2023–24
- Taça de Portugal: 2023–24
- Taça da Liga: 2023–24
- Supertaça de Portugal: 2023

Spain

- Algarve Cup: 2017
