= Nerea Gantxegi =

Spanish footballer (born 1994)

Personal information
- Full name: Nerea Gantxegi Moso
- Date of birth: 7 September 1994 (age 32)
- Place of birth: Mondragón, Spain
- Position: Defender

Team information
- Current team: Levante Las Planas
- Number: 23

Youth career
- 2006–2008: Urki
- 2008–2010: Eibar

Senior career*
Years	Team	Apps	(Gls)
2010–2011	Eibar B		
2010–2012	Eibar	1+	
2012–2013	Zarautz		
2013–2016	Añorga		
2017–2022	Eibar	30	(2)
2022-	Levante Las Planas	1	(0)
- * Club domestic league appearances and goals as of 16:58, 31 October 2021 (UTC)

Nerea Gantxegi Moso (born 7 September 1994) is a Spanish footballer who plays as a defender for Levante Las Planas.

== Club career ==
Gantxegi started her career at Urki.
