= Anita Marcos =

Spanish footballer (born 2000)

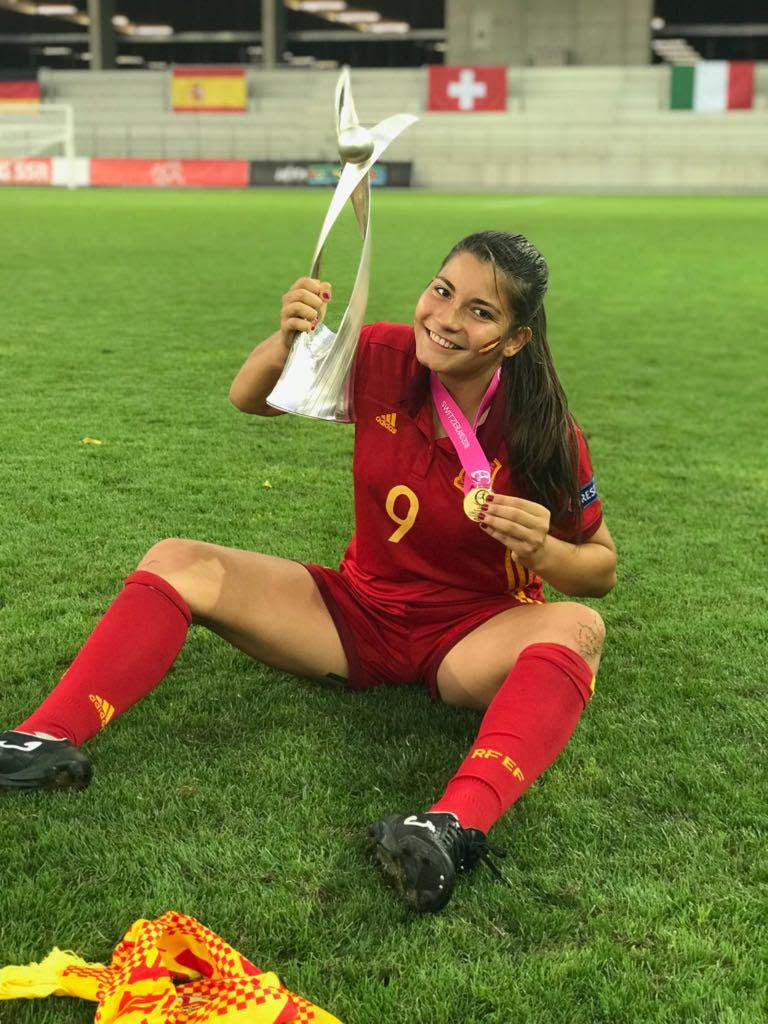
- Marcos with Spain U19 in 2018

Personal information
- Full name: Ana Marcos Moral
- Date of birth: 9 July 2000 (age 26)
- Place of birth: Seville, Spain
- Height: 1.69 m (5 ft 7 in)
- Position: Forward

Team information
- Current team: Madrid CFF
- Number: 10

Senior career*
Years	Team	Apps	(Gls)
2015–2016	Torrelodones		
2016–2020	Atlético Madrid B	2+	(0+)
2017–2021	Atlético Madrid	16	(1)
2020	→ Celtic (loan)		
2021	→ Valencia (loan)	16	(3)
2021–2022	Sporting de Huelva	26	(10)
2022–2025	Valencia	66	(22)
2025–2026	Madrid CFF	28	(9)
2026–	Espanyol	1	(0)

International career^{‡}
2017–2018	Spain U19	8	(1)
2022	Spain U23	3	(0)
Medal record
Representing Spain
UEFA Women's Under-19 Championship
First place	2018 Switzerland
- * Club domestic league appearances and goals as of 20 September 2025 ‡ National team caps and goals as of 06:12, 23 December 2023 (UTC)

Ana Marcos Moral (born 9 July 2000) is a Spanish professional footballer who plays as a forward for Liga F club Madrid CFF.

== Club career ==
Anita Marcos started her career at Torrelodones.
