= Sara Ezquerro =

Spanish footballer (born 1999)

Personal information
- Full name: Sara Ezquerro de las Heras
- Date of birth: 5 April 1999 (age 27)
- Place of birth: Madrid, Spain
- Height: 1.71 m (5 ft 7 in)
- Position: Goalkeeper

Team information
- Current team: Real Madrid
- Number: 1

Senior career*
| Years | Team | Apps | (Gls) |
| 2012–2013 | Torrelodones | | |
| 2013–2016 | Atlético de Madrid | | |
| 2016–2020 | CD Tacón | | |
| 2020–2021 | Real Madrid | 1 | (0) |
| 2021- | Levante Las Planas | | |

International career
| 2018–2019 | Spain U19 | | |
- * Club domestic league appearances and goals as of 20 June 2021

Sara Ezquerro de las Heras (born 5 April 1999), simply known as Sara Ezquerro, is a Spanish professional goalkeeper who plays for Segunda División club Levante Las Planas.

== Club career ==
Ezquerro started her football career when she first joined the Torrelodones youth teams in 2012. She only spent a years at the club's academy before moving to Atlético de Madrid for the 2013–14 season, joining their C team and later progressing to their B team.

In 2016, Ezquerro left Atlético de Madrid following an incident in which she was photographed celebrating victory in the 2016 UEFA Champions League Final for Real Madrid, the club she supported but who were not only her employers' main rivals in men's football but also playing against Atlético in that match. Following this incident, she received harassment on social media, which included death and rape threats. Following her departure from Atlético de Madrid, she joined TACÓN. She played at the club until 2020, when Tacón changed its name to Real Madrid.

== Club statistics ==
| Club | Country | Year |
|---|---|---|
| Torrelodones | Spain | 2012–13 |
| Atlético de Madrid | Spain | 2013–16 |
| TACÓN | Spain | 2016–20 |
| Real Madrid | Spain | 2020–2021 |
| Levante Las Planas | Spain | 2021–present |
