= Ana Franco =

Spanish footballer (born 1999)

Personal information
- Full name: Ana Franco de la Vega
- Date of birth: 6 June 1999 (age 27)
- Place of birth: Cáceres, Spain
- Height: 1.71 m (5 ft 7 in)
- Position: Midfielder

Senior career*
Years	Team	Apps	(Gls)
2014–2017	Cáceres		
2017–2024	Sevilla	115	(18)
2024–2026	Levante UD	44	(3)

International career^{‡}
2021–2022	Spain U23	5	(0)
- * Club domestic league appearances and goals as of 09:45, 1 May 2022 (UTC) ‡ National team caps and goals as of 04:22, 22 December 2023 (UTC)

Ana Franco de la Vega (born 6 June 1999) is a Spanish footballer who plays as a midfielder.

== Club career ==
Franco started her career at Cáceres.

== International career ==
Franco has been called up regularly to the Spain under-23 team.
