= Ainara Manterola =

Spanish footballer

Personal information
- Full name: Ainara Manterola Ikutza
- Date of birth: 19 June 1995 (age 31)
- Place of birth: Orio, Spain
- Position: Defender

Youth career
- Orioko FT

Senior career*
Years	Team	Apps	(Gls)
2011–2016	Real Sociedad	65	(0)
2016–2018	Oiartzun	12+	
2018–	Añorga		

International career
2012–2014	Spain U19		
- * Club domestic league appearances and goals as of 08:51, 5 October 2021 (UTC)

Ainara Manterola Ikutza (born 19 June 1995) is a Spanish footballer who most recently played as a defender for Añorga. She is an under-17 and under-19 international.

== Career ==
After gaining attention for some of her performances at youth level for Orioko, Manterola joined Real Sociedad at the age of 16 and played in the centre-back position. After five years at Real Sociedad, Manterola transferred to Oiartzun for the start of the 2016–17 season. On 4 January 2017, having played 13 out of the 14 fixtures prior, Manterola tore her cruciate ligament. The injury meant that she would be ruled out of playing the rest of the season.

== Personal life ==
Manterola comes from a sporting family and was born in Orio, Spain. Her great-grandfather, Batista Oliden, was a rower, as were her two grandfathers. In addition to this, her father, Joseba, is a football coach, her mother, Isabel, was a basketball player and her sister, Leire, is a footballer. Oliden won the Kontxako Bandera a record thirteen times.
