= Real Betis Féminas =

Spanish football club

- Full name: Real Betis Balompié Féminas
- Founded: 2011; 15 years ago
- Ground: Luis del Sol, Seville, Andalusia, Spain
- Capacity: 1,318
- Chairman: Miguel Guillén
- Manager: Marco Tamarit
- League: Segunda Federación
- 2025–26: Primera Federación, 13th of 14 (relegated)
- Website: realbetisbalompie.es/feminas
Home colours	Away colours	Third colours

Real Betis Balompié Féminas is a football club based in Seville, Andalusia, Spain. It is the women's football team of Real Betis and competes in the Segunda Federación, the second tier of Spanish women's football. The club plays their home games at the Ciudad Deportiva Luis del Sol.

== History ==
The women's team of Real Betis was founded in 2011 after integrating local team Azahar CF into the structure of the club.

In its first season, the club could not promote to Segunda División, but achieved a vacant spot for playing in the league. Four years later, on 22 June 2016, Real Betis promoted to Primera División.

== Players ==
=== Current squad ===
As of 17 March 2025

Note: Flags indicate national team as defined under FIFA eligibility rules; some limited exceptions apply. Players may hold more than one non-FIFA nationality.

No.	Pos.	Nation	Player
1	GK	ESP	Noelia Gil
4	DF	ESP	María Jiménez
5	DF	WAL	Rhiannon Roberts
6	MF	ESP	Gema Soliveres
7	FW	ESP	Carla Armengol
8	MF	ESP	Naima García
10	FW	ESP	Rosa Márquez
11	DF	ESP	Nuria Ligero
13	GK	ESP	Paula Vizoso
14	FW	ESP	Carolina Férez
15	DF	ESP	Esther Martín-Pozuelo
16	FW	ESP	María Ruiz Gámez

No.	Pos.	Nation	Player
17	FW	JAM	Tiffany Cameron
18	FW	MAR	Yasmine Zouhir
19	DF	GEQ	Dorine Chuigoué
20	MF	NGR	Chinyere Mercy Kalu
21	MF	ESP	Estela Fernández
22	MF	ESP	Júlia Aguado
27	FW	ESP	Ángela Cabezas
28	MF	ESP	Marina Sánchez
39	MF	ESP	Alba Rodao
30	MF	ESP	Blanca Muñoz
31	GK	ESP	Ana Morcillo
32	FW	ESP	Carla Santaliestra
—	MF	MAS	Qaseh Rania

== Season to season ==
Season	Div.	Pos.	Copa de la Reina
2011/12	Reg.	2nd	
2012/13	2ª	5th	
2013/14	2ª	3rd	
2014/15	2ª	1st	
2015/16	2ª	1st	
2016/17	1ª	11th	
2017/18	1ª	6th	Quarterfinals
2018/19	1ª	6th	Round of 16
2019/20	1ª	12th	Quarterfinals
2020/21	1ª	12th	
2021/22	1ª	9th	Round of 16
2022/23	1ª	12th	Third round
2023/24	1ª	11th	Round of 16
2024/25	1ª	15th	Third round
