= Ciudad Deportiva Luis del Sol =

Real Betis football training ground

Coordinates: 37°21′06″N 05°58′56″W

- La fábrica verdiblanca
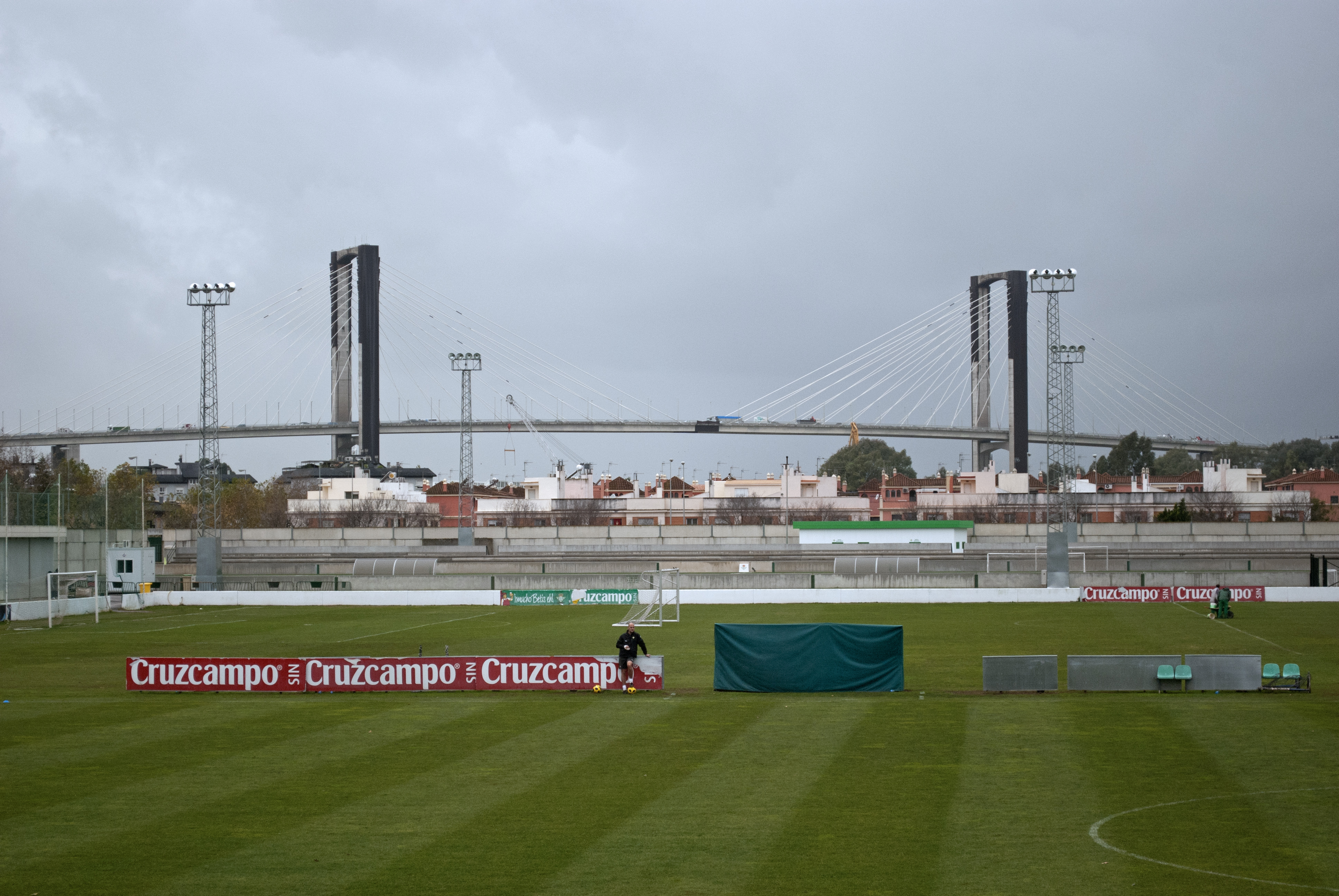
- Interactive map of Ciudad Deportiva Luis del Sol
- Location: Seville; Andalusia, Spain
- Owner: Real Betis
- Type: Football training ground

Construction
- Built: 1997

Tenant
- Real Betis (training) (1997-)

Website
- Ciudad Deportiva Luis del Sol

The Ciudad Deportiva Luis del Sol, is the training ground of the Spanish football club Real Betis. The centre which is named after the former Real Betis player Luis del Sol, is commonly nicknamed as La fábrica verdiblanca.

== Overview ==
Occupying an area of 45,000 m^{2}, the complex is located on Avenida de Italia of Los Bermejales district in Seville, adjacent to Estadio Benito Villamarín; the home of Real Betis Balompie.

The training centre was officially opened on 19 December 1997 by then-president of the club Manuel Ruiz de Lopera, accompanied by the Cardinal Priest Carlos Amigo Vallejo the Archbishop Emeritus of Seville.

== Facilities ==
- Estadio Luis del Sol is the central stadium of the Ciudad Deportiva with a capacity of 1,318 seats, is the home stadium of Betis Deportivo Balompié, the reserve team of Real Betis. The club's youth sides and the women's team also play at the complex.
- 1 regular-sized natural grass pitch.
- 1 regular-sized artificial turf pitch.
- 1 seven-a-side artificial turf pitch.
- Service centre with swimming pool, gymnasium and underground parking area for 63 vehicles.
