= Patri Ojeda =

Spanish footballer (born 1991)

Personal information
- Full name: Patricia Ojeda Ramírez
- Date of birth: 8 March 1991 (age 35)
- Place of birth: Las Palmas, Spain
- Height: 1.66 m (5 ft 5 in)
- Position: Defender

Team information
- Current team: SD Eibar
- Number: 3

Senior career*
Years	Team	Apps	(Gls)
2007–2009	CD Ingenio		
2009–2011	Las Palmas	20	(6)
2011–2012	Tacuense		
2012–2013	CD Ingenio		
2013–2016	Achamán Santa Lucía		
2016–2017	Tacuense	30	(3)
2017–2024	Sporting Club de Huelva	169	(10)
2024–2026	SD Eibar	53	(1)
- * Club domestic league appearances and goals as of 2 July 2026

Patricia Ojeda Ramírez (born 8 March 1991) is a Spanish footballer who plays as a defender. She has played for many clubs including Sporting Club de Huelva and SD Eibar.

== Club career ==
Patri Ojeda started her career at Agüimes.
