= Sandra Castelló =

Spanish footballer (born 1993)

Personal information
- Full name: Sandra Castelló Oliver
- Date of birth: 7 August 1993 (age 33)
- Place of birth: Xàbia, Spain
- Height: 1.71 m (5 ft 7 in)
- Position: Defender

Team information
- Current team: Sporting de Huelva
- Number: 16

Senior career*
Years	Team	Apps	(Gls)
2009–2011	Levante B		
2010–2013	Levante	37	(1)
2013–	Sporting de Huelva	242	(9)
- * Club domestic league appearances and goals as of 10:28, 10 March 2022 (UTC)

Sandra Castelló Oliver (born 7 August 1993) is a Spanish footballer who plays as a defender for Sporting de Huelva.

== Club career ==
Castelló started her career at Levante B.
