= Sporting de Huelva =

Spanish football club

- Full name: Sporting Club de Huelva
- Founded: 1979 (original); 2004 (restructured)
- Ground: Ciudad Deportiva del Recreativo de Huelva; Huelva, Spain
- Capacity: 1,300
- Chairman: Manuela Romero Landa
- Manager: Antonio Toledo
- League: Segunda Federación
- 2025-26: Segunda Federación Group 3, 3rd of 14
- Website: https://www.sportingclubhuelva.com
Home colours	Away colours

Sporting Club de Huelva is a Spanish women's football club based in Huelva, Andalusia. The club currently play in the Segunda Federación, the third tier of the Spanish women's football league system. It was founded in Huelva in 2004 as a restructuring of an homonymous junior (men's) football club, which had been founded in 1979 and dissolved nine years later, by its original founder, Antonio Toledo, who has also served as the team's manager and sporting director.

== History ==
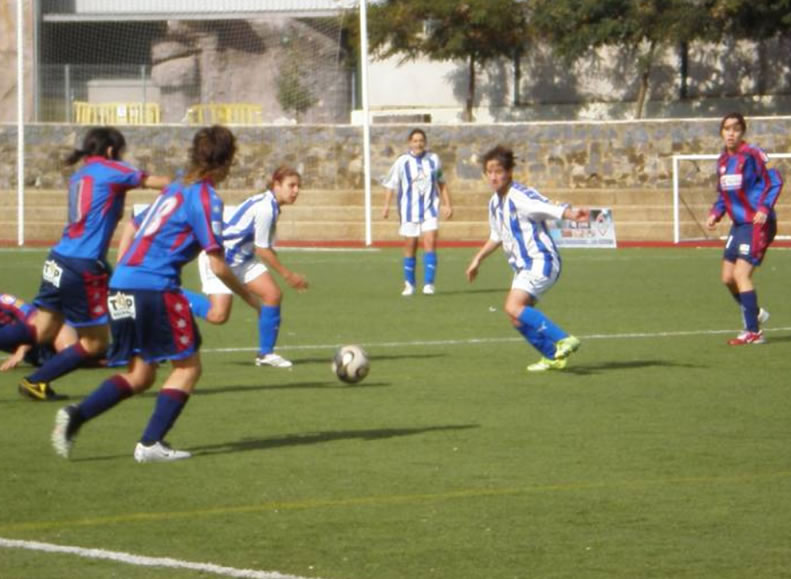
2006–07 Superliga match against Levante UD

Gaining promotion to the Liga F in just two seasons, Sporting Huelva debuted at the 2006–07 season. It has successfully avoided relegation for the past three seasons, actually ending the 2008–09 season just one point short for qualifying to the Copa de la Reina, losing the spot at the last matchday.

Next year Sporting was third in their group in the first stage of the newly reformed competition, narrowly missing qualification for the title contenders group. The team ranked again 3rd in its group in the second stage, qualifying for the Copa de la Reina for the first time. They qualified for the quarter-finals, eliminating Atlético Madrid before being ousted by Torrejón.

Financial difficulties conditioned the club's 2010–11 season. Following a weak performance in the first stage the team managed to recover in the second half of the season and was 2nd in their group, but Sporting had to renounce taking part in the Copa de la Reina.

Sporting chained four wins in the first weeks of the 2011–12 season, holding the lead of the table for the first time in its history. As of the end of 2011 the team stood 4th with 9 wins in 15 games, but after a less successful second half, the team ended in the 8th position, was anyway is its best result to date. During the Christmas break president José Muñoz Lozano announced Sporting was in negotiations to become Recreativo Huelva's women's team for the 2012–13 season, but an agreement was not reached and Sporting was instead relocated to nearby Trigueros for the 2012–13 season.

On 17 May 2015, Sporting de Huelva won its first national title after achieving the 2015 Copa de la Reina by defeating Valencia CF in the final match by 2–1.

== Players ==
=== Current squad ===
As of 18 April 2023

Note: Flags indicate national team as defined under FIFA eligibility rules; some limited exceptions apply. Players may hold more than one non-FIFA nationality.

No.	Pos.	Nation	Player
1	GK	ENG	Chelsea Ashurst
3	DF	BRA	Ana Carol
4	FW	VEN	Raiderlin Carrasco
9	FW	ESP	María Ruiz
10	MF	SWE	Sofia Hagman
11	FW	SVK	Patrícia Hmírová
12	FW	ESP	Bárbara López
13	GK	SLO	Zala Meršnik
14	DF	ESP	Laia Ballesté
15	DF	ESP	Patri Ojeda
16	DF	ESP	Sandra Castelló (captain)

No.	Pos.	Nation	Player
17	DF	ESP	Laura Blasco
18	DF	USA	Athena Kühn
19	DF	ESP	Paula Romero
20	MF	SWE	Amanda Edgren
21	FW	ESP	Cristina Gey
22	DF	ISL	Berglind Rós Ágústsdóttir
23	MF	POL	Patrycja Balcerzak
24	FW	ESP	Natalia Nogareda
25	GK	ESP	Bella Ramírez
26	FW	ESP	Eva Cintado
—	FW	AUS	Anna Margraf

=== Former internationals ===
- Spain: Noelia Aybar, Priscila Borja, Alharilla Casado, Dolores Gallardo, Sarita Serrat
- Argentina: Florencia Bonsegundo
- Brazil: Renata Capobianco, Dayane da Rocha, Fabiana Simões, Thaís Picarte, Raquel
- Bulgaria: Silvia Radoyska
- Chile: Geraldine Leyton, Paloma López, Bárbara Santibáñez
- Colombia: Lady Andrade, Korina Clavijo, Sofía García
- Croatia: Ana Jelenčić
- Finland: Jenny Danielsson
- (The Gambia) Gambia: Fatou Kanteh
- Ghana: Ernestina Abambila, Princella Adubea
- Japan: Yoko Tanaka
- Kazakhstan: Irina Saratovtseva
- Mexico: Nayeli Rangel
- Morocco: Meryem Hajri
- Nigeria: Peace Efih
- Paraguay: Lice Chamorro
- Portugal: Rita Carneiro, Mónica Gonçalves
- Romania: Olivia Oprea, Elena Pavel, Laura Rus
- Slovakia: Lucia El-Dahaibiová
- Ukraine: Vera Djatel, Yulia Kornievets
- Zimbabwe: Rutendo Makore

== Competition record ==
Season	Div.	Pos.	Copa de la Reina
2004–05	Reg.		
2005–06	2ª	1st	
2006–07	1ª	10th	
2007–08	1ª	11th	
2008–09	1ª	9th	
2009–10	1ª	13th	Quarter-finals
2010–11	1ª	12th	
2011–12	1ª	8th	
2012–13	1ª	9th	
2013–14	1ª	8th	Quarter-finals
2014–15	1ª	8th	Champion
2015–16	1ª	8th	Quarter-finals
2016–17	1ª	10th	
2017–18	1ª	9th	
2018–19	1ª	14th	Round of 16
2019–20	1ª	14th	Round of 16
2020–21	1ª	10th	
2021–22	1ª	10th	Runner-ups
2022–23	1ª	13th	Third round
2023–24	1ª	16th	Round of 16
2024–25	2ª	14th	Round of 16
2025–26	3ª	3rd	Third round

== Titles ==
- Copa de la Reina: (1)
  - 2015
