= 2023–24 Copa de la Reina de Fútbol =

2023–2024 Copa de la Reina de Fútbol
Campeonato de España Copa de Su Majestad la Reina

Tournament details
- Country: Spain
- Teams: 48

Final positions
- Champions: FC Barcelona (10th title)
- Runners-up: Real Sociedad

Tournament statistics
- Matches played: 49
- Goals scored: 141 (2.88 per match)
- Top goal scorer: Mariona (6 goals)

The 2023–24 Copa de la Reina de Fútbol was the 42nd edition of the Spanish women's association football national cup organized by the Royal Spanish Football Federation (RFEF).

Atlético Madrid were the defending champions; their efforts to retain the trophy were ended by Real Sociedad in the semi-finals.

Barcelona won the title for a record-extending tenth time after they defeated Real Sociedad 8–0 in the final. With the eight goals scored, Barcelona equalled the biggest win ever in a Copa de la Reina final, matching Oiartzun's win 8–0 against Porvenir from the 1988 Copa de la Reina final. The final was the most attended Copa de la Reina final ever with 25,617 spectators, surpassing the 17,500 spectators that attended the 2018–19 final between Real Sociedad and Atlético Madrid. The occasion was somewhat marred by the failure of the RFEF to send any delegation for the trophy and medal presentation, with the players forced to distribute the medals themselves from a box; the same 'snub' by the federation had occurred previously when the same teams contested the 2023 Supercopa final.

== Schedule and format ==
All ties are played in a single-match decider at the home ground of the lower division opponent, except for the semi-finals which will be a two-legged match. All matches ending in a tie will be decided in extra time; and if it persists, by a penalty shootout. The semi-finals first-leg will be played on 14 February 2024, and second-leg on 13 March 2024. The final was played on Saturday, 18 May 2024, at La Romareda in Zaragoza.

Round	Draw date	Match date	Fixtures	Clubs	Format details
First round	4 September 2023	13 September 2023	16	32 → 16	Knock-out tournament type: Single match.
Second round	29 September 2023	10–11 October 2023	8	16 → 8	Knock-out tournament type: Single match.
Third round	18 October 2023	7–9 November 2023	8	16 → 8	Knock-out tournament type: Single match.
Round of 16	15 November 2023	13–14 January 2024	8	16 → 8	Knock-out tournament type: Single match.
Quarter-finals	18 January 2024	7–8 February 2024	4	8 → 4	Knock-out tournament type: Single match.
Semi-finals	9 February 2024	6–7 March 2024	2	4 → 2	Knock-out tournament type: Double match.
Semi-finals	9 February 2024	12/14 March 2024	2	4 → 2	Knock-out tournament type: Double match.
Final	9 February 2024	18 May 2024	1	2 → 1	Single match.

== First round ==
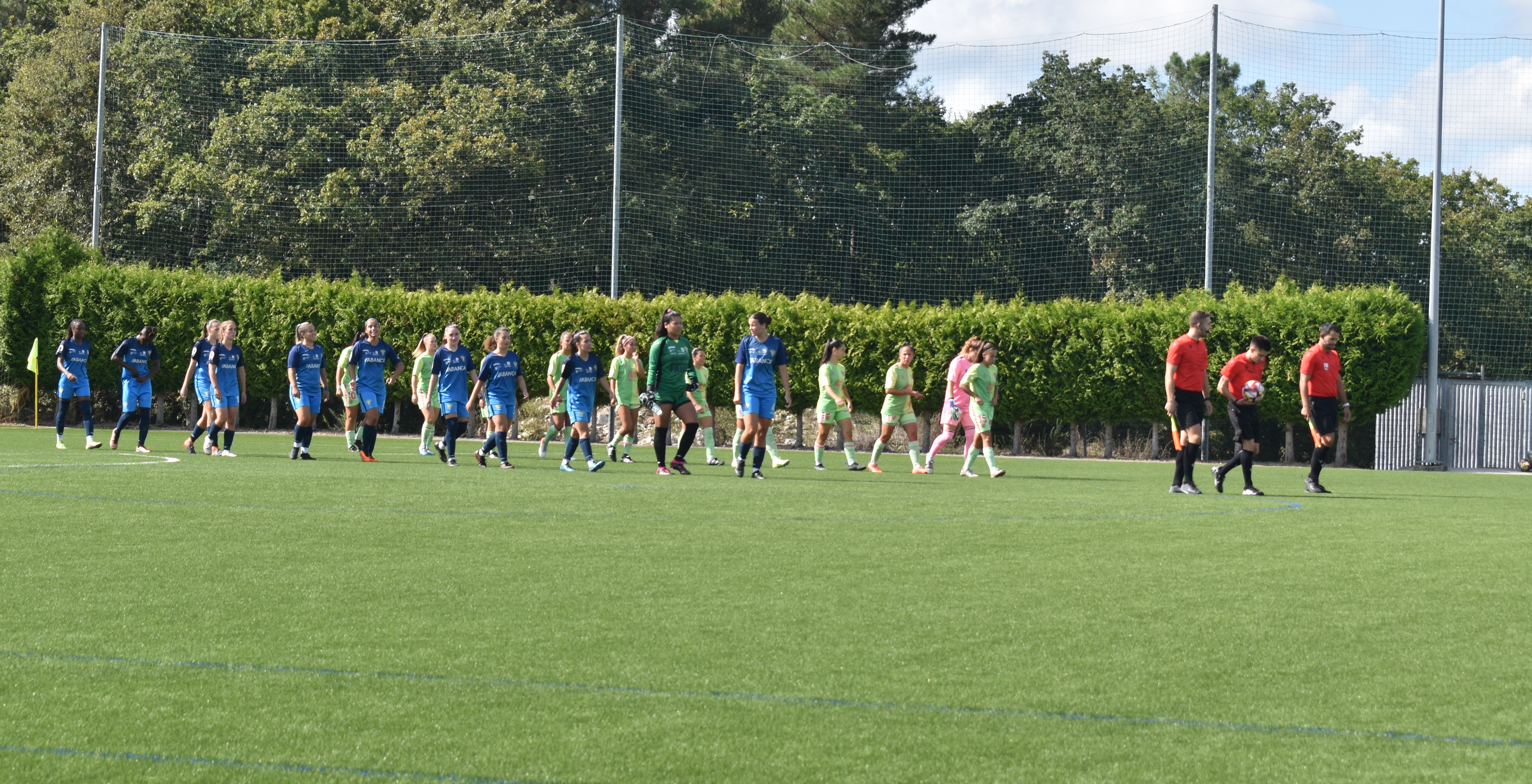
PM Friol - Málaga CF.

=== Draw ===
The draw was completed by the RFEF on 4 September 2023, at the Ciudad del Fútbol de Las Rozas in Madrid.

=== Matches ===
13 September 2023	Getafe	1–5	Dux Logroño	Getafe
13:00 CEST (UTC+2)	R. Mbappé 36'	Report	Olga 34'; MArina 55', 90'; Ida 65'; Clara 71'	Stadium: Poliderpotivo Giner de los Ríos; Referee: Ágata López García

13 September 2023	Zaragoza	2–3	Cacereño	Zaragoza
15:00 CEST (UTC+2)	Andrea 52'; Laura T. 85'	Report	Bárbara 26'; Esther 30'; Rana 33'	Stadium: Campo Mudéjar; Referee: Beatriz Arregui Gamir

13 September 2023	Peluquería Mixta Friol	0–1	Málaga	Friol
16:30 CEST (UTC+2)		Report	Encarni 58'	Stadium: Campo A Reigosa; Referee: Alberto Lago Barreiro

13 September 2023	Parquesol	0–2	Córdoba	Valladolid
16:45 CEST (UTC+2)		Report	Marta Esojo 19'; Aila 57'	Stadium: Campo Jose Luis Saso; Referee: Carlos Cañibano Arias

13 September 2023	Racing Santander	1–4	Granada	Torrelavega
17:00 CEST (UTC+2)	Naiara 2'	Report	Imade 33', 44', 56'; Naima 80'	Stadium: Campo Santa Ana; Referee: Zulema Gonzalez Gonzalez

13 September 2023	Viajes Interrías	2–3	Albacete	Sanxenxo
17:00 CEST (UTC+2)	Machado 54', 70'	Report	Ruano 30' (o.g.); Martínez 38', 42'	Stadium: Novo San Pedro; Referee: Sara Fernandez Ceferino

13 September 2023	Torrelodones	0–2	Juan Grande	Torrelodones
18:00 CEST (UTC+2)		Report	Devaux 63'; García 69'	Stadium: Campo Julian Ariza; Referee: Alejandra Raza Fernández

13 September 2023	Pradejón	1–3	Real Oviedo	Pradejón
18:30 CEST (UTC+2)	Aramburu 67'	Report	Gonzalez 31'; Mauri 44'; Ruiz 86'	Stadium: Campo Pradejón; Referee: Izaskun Muñoz Echeverria

13 September 2023	Sárdoma	0–2	AEM Lleida	Vigo
18:30 CEST (UTC+2)		Report	García 8', 12'	Stadium: As Relfas; Referee: Verónica González Sánchez

13 September 2023	Bizkerre	0–2	Rayo Vallecano	Getxo
19:00 CEST (UTC+2)		Report	Barrasa 7'; Iris 78'	Stadium: Campo Bolue 3 Referee: Ingrid Pardo Magdalena

13 September 2023	Europa	0–2	Eibar	Barcelona
19:00 CEST (UTC+2)		Report	Pizarro 26'; Pallares 37' (o.g.)	Stadium: Nou Sardenya; Referee: Paola Cebollada López

13 September 2023	Huesca	0–1	Espanyol	Huesca
19:00 CEST (UTC+2)		Report	Molina 85'	Stadium: El Alcoraz; Referee: Andrea López Méndez

13 September 2023	Balears FC	1–0	Deportivo La Coruña	Palma de Mallorca
19:30 CEST (UTC+2)	Karla 45'	Report		Stadium: Camp Son Malferit; Referee: Paula Porcuna Sánchez

13 September 2023	Tenerife	0–3	Osasuna	Santa Cruz de Tenerife
20:00 CEST (UTC+2)		Report	Herranz 42'; Olarte 44'; Llacuno 89'	Stadium: Ciudad Deportiva Javier Pérez; Referee: Cristina Aguilera Manzano

13 September 2023	Almería	0–0 (a.e.t.) (6–7 p)	La Solana	Almería
20:00 CEST (UTC+2)		Report		Stadium: Estadio de La Juventud; Referee: Andrea Viciana Fernandez
	Penalties
	Campoy (penalty scored); Sergio (penalty missed); Agüera (penalty scored); Lomeña (penalty scored); De Miguel (penalty scored); Juarez (penalty missed); Zumaquero (penalty scored); Miras (penalty scored); Jimenez (penalty missed)		Ngaska (penalty scored); Mori (penalty scored); Ruiz (penalty scored); Serrano (penalty scored); Alcolea (penalty missed); Barbero (penalty missed); Tshilombo (penalty scored); Lisicki (penalty scored); Sanchez (penalty scored)

13 September 2023	CFF Albacete	0–2	Real Unión de Tenerife	Albacete
20:00 CEST (UTC+2)		Report	López 49', 53'	Stadium: Campo Jose Copete; Referee: Nuria Sánchez García

== Second round ==
=== Draw ===
The draw was completed by the RFEF on 29 September 2023, at the Ciudad del Fútbol de Las Rozas in Madrid.

=== Matches ===
10 October 2023	Albacete	3–0	Rayo Vallecano	Albacete
19:30 CEST (UTC+2)	Herrero 4'; L. Ortega 69'; Patricia 90+5'	Report		Stadium: Ciudad Deportiva Andrés Iniesta; Referee: Beatriz Arregui Gamir

11 October 2023	Real Oviedo	1–0	Dux Logroño	Oviedo
17:00 CEST (UTC+2)	Pali 40'	Report		Stadium: Complejo Deportivo Jose Fernandez; Referee: Anne Asla Borrallo

11 October 2023	Osasuna	2–1	AEM Lleida	Aranguren
17:00 CEST (UTC+2)	Celia 3'; Merche 111'	Report	Palacios 30'	Stadium: Tajonar; Referee: Verónica González Sánchez

11 October 2023	Córdoba	2–2 (a.e.t.) (1–3 p)	Juan Grande	Córdoba
19:00 CEST (UTC+2)	Morilla 23'; Carlota 92'	Report	Judith 83'; Mio 112'	Stadium: Ciudad Deportiva Rafael Gómez; Referee: Genesis Suarez Medina
	Penalties
	Naza (penalty missed); Carlota (penalty missed); Alba Herrera (penalty missed); Ocón (penalty scored)		Marta (penalty scored); Sonia (penalty scored); Itxaso (penalty missed); Nekane (penalty missed); Mio (penalty scored)

11 October 2023	Balears FC	0–1	Granada	Palma de Mallorca
19:30 CEST (UTC+2)		Report	Ornella 81'	Stadium: Camp Son Malferit; Referee: Alicia Espinosa Ríos

11 October 2023	La Solana	0–1	Eibar	La Solana
20:00 CEST (UTC+2)		Report	Malado 73'	Stadium: La Moheda; Referee: Beatriz Cuesta Arribas

11 October 2023	Málaga	0–2	Cacereño	Málaga
20:00 CEST (UTC+2)		Report	Esther 48'; Nerea 90+2'	Stadium: Estadio Los Manantiales; Referee: Sara Fernández Ceferino

11 October 2023	Real Unión de Tenerife	2–1	Espanyol	Santa Cruz de Tenerife
20:30 CEST (UTC+2)	María 82'; Elsa 88'	Report	Nuria M. 51'	Stadium: Campo de Fútbol de la Esperanza; Referee: Josefa Sánchez Gómez

== Third round ==
=== Draw ===
The draw was completed by the RFEF on 18 October 2023, at the Ciudad del Fútbol de Las Rozas in Madrid.

=== Matches ===
7 November 2023	Real Oviedo	0–0 (a.e.t.) (5–4 p)	Alhama	Oviedo
16:00 CEST (UTC+2)		Report		Stadium: Complejo Deportivo Jose Ramon Suarez Fernandez; Referee: Coral Couso Cuadrado
	Penalties
	G. Ginés (penalty scored); Pradilla (penalty missed); Andrea (penalty scored); Buceta (penalty scored); Anina (penalty scored); M. Crespo (penalty scored)		Cindy (penalty scored); Estefa (penalty scored); Paula M. (penalty scored); Alba S. (penalty missed); Raquel (penalty scored); Lena Pérez (penalty missed)

8 November 2023	Osasuna	1–2	Real Betis	Aranguren
18:00 CEST (UTC+2)	Iara 56'	Report	Márquez 11'; Armengol 82'	Stadium: Tajonar; Referee: Raquel Suárez González

8 November 2023	Real Unión de Tenerife	0–1	Sporting de Huelva	Santa Cruz de Tenerife
19:00 CEST (UTC+2)		Report	De Filippo 25'	Stadium: Campo de Fútbol Argelio Tabares; Referee: Ylenia Sánchez Miguel

8 November 2023	Cacereño	1–1 (a.e.t.) (2–4 p)	Alavés	Cáceres
19:00 CEST (UTC+2)	Sofía 104' (o.g.)	Report	Alba Aznar 120'	Stadium: Estadio Manuel Sánchez Delgado; Referee: Elena Casal Fernández
	Penalties
	Nora (penalty missed); Keefe (penalty missed); Manoly (penalty scored); Cassin (penalty scored)		Morera (penalty scored); Santana (penalty scored); Carid (penalty scored); L. Moreno (penalty missed); Carrillo (penalty scored)

8 November 2023	Eibar	0–1 (a.e.t.)	Levante Las Planas	Eibar
19:00 CEST (UTC+2)		Report	Julve 108'	Stadium: Ipurua; Referee: Amy Peñalver Pearce

8 November 2023	Albacete	3–2	Villarreal	Albacete
19:00 CEST (UTC+2)	L. Ortega 17'; Zafra 26'; C. Gómez 90'	Report	Kanteh 49', 74'	Stadium: Ciudad Deportiva Andrés Iniesta; Referee: Arantza Gallastegui Pérez

8 November 2023	Juan Grande	0–1	Valencia	Las Palmas
19:00 CEST (UTC+2)		Report	Kerlly 87'	Stadium: Campo Juan Grande; Referee: Patricia Luna Varo

9 November 2023	Granada	1–4	Athletic Bilbao	Granada
20:00 CEST (UTC+2)	Naima 52'	Report	Nahikari 11'; C. Pinedo 64'; Amezaga 77'; Elexpuru 89'	Stadium: Nuevo Los Cármenes; Referee: Marta Huerta de Aza

== Round of 16 ==
=== Draw ===
The draw was completed by the RFEF on 15 November 2023, at the Centro Deportivo Municipal Luis Aragonés in Madrid.

=== Matches ===
13 January 2024	Albacete	0–6	Barcelona	Albacete
13:00 CET (UTC+1)		Report	Dragoni 20'; Fernández 35'; Oshoala 37'; Batlle 55'; Pina 77'; Mariona 85'	Stadium: Estadio Carlos Belmonte; Referee: Andrea Firvida Fernández

13 January 2024	Real Betis	0–5	Real Madrid	Sevilla
16:30 CET (UTC+1)		Report	Athenea 5'; Toletti 45' (pen.); Caicedo 69'; Møller 79'; Olofsson 80'	Stadium: Ciudad Deportiva Luis del Sol; Referee: Elena Peláez Amillas

13 January 2024	Valencia	0–1	Levante	Paterna
18:30 CET (UTC+1)		Report	Ramírez 44'	Stadium: Estadio Antonio Puchades; Referee: Arantza Gallastegui Pérez

13 January 2024	Alavés	1–2	Atlético Madrid	Vitoria-Gasteiz
21:00 CET (UTC+1)	Carrillo 90'	Report	García 11'; Risa 25'	Stadium: José Luis Compañón; Referee: María Gloria Planes Terol

14 January 2024	Real Oviedo	1–1 (a.e.t.) (2–4 p)	UD Tenerife	Oviedo
12:00 CET (UTC+1)	Garrido 90+2'	Report	Gavira 28'	Stadium: Estadio José Ramón Suárez Fernández; Referee: Alicia Espinosa Ríos
	Penalties
	Ginés (penalty scored); Pali (penalty missed); Anina (penalty scored); Helena Torres (penalty missed)		Pisco (penalty scored); Thaís (penalty scored); Ramos (penalty scored); Gavira (penalty scored)

14 January 2024	Levante Las Planas	0–4	Sevilla	Sant Joan Despí
12:00 CET (UTC+1)		Report	Martín-Prieto 51'; Nicoli 67' (o.g.); Gili 83'; Martín 87'	Stadium: Municipal de Les Planes; Referee: Elisabeth Calvo Valentín

14 January 2024	Sporting de Huelva	1–4	Real Sociedad	Huelva
12:00 CET (UTC+1)	María Ruiz 5'	Report	Eizagirre 3' (pen.); Franssi 37'; Vanegas 60'; Konat 83' (o.g.)	Stadium: Ciudad Deportiva Francisco Mendoza; Referee: Paola Cebollada López

14 January 2024	Athletic Bilbao	1–0	Madrid CFF	Bilbao
17:00 CET (UTC+1)	Nahikari 2'	Report		Stadium: San Mamés; Referee: Amy Peñalver Pearce

== Quarter-finals ==
=== Draw ===
The draw was completed by the RFEF on 18 January 2024, at the Centro Deportivo Municipal Luis Aragonés in Madrid.

=== Matches ===
7 February 2024	Athletic Bilbao	1–1 (a.e.t.) (7–6 p)	UD Tenerife	Lezama
19:00 CET (UTC+1)	Elexpuru 10'	Report	Gavira 23'	Stadium: Lezama (Field 2); Attendance: 1,193; Referee: María Planes Terol
	Penalties
	Zugasti (penalty missed); Mariana (penalty scored); Maddi (penalty scored); Amezaga (penalty missed); Elexpuru (penalty scored); Gara (penalty scored); Bibi (penalty scored); Landaluze (penalty scored); Oguiza (penalty scored)		Pisco (penalty scored); Babajide (penalty missed); N. Ramos (penalty scored); Gavira (penalty scored); Thaís (penalty missed); Barroso (penalty scored); Monday (penalty scored); Zaremba (penalty scored); Estella (penalty missed)

7 February 2024	Barcelona	8–0	Sevilla	Sant Joan Despí
19:30 CET (UTC+1)	Paralluelo 6', 37'; Bonmatí 16', 58'; Mariona 18', 33' (pen.); Hansen 40'; Arias 77'	Report		Stadium: Estadi Johan Cruyff; Attendance: 3,438; Referee: Alicia Espinosa Ríos

8 February 2024	Levante	1–2	Real Sociedad	Buñol
19:00 CET (UTC+1)	Andonova 8'	Report	Franssi 57'; Vanegas 70'	Stadium: Ciudad Deportiva de Buñol; Attendance: 257; Referee: Andrea Fírvida Fernández

8 February 2024	Atlético Madrid	2–1	Real Madrid	Alcalá de Henares
21:00 CET (UTC+1)	Ludmila 37'; Navarro 53'	Report	Caicedo 47'	Stadium: Centro Deportivo Wanda; Attendance: 1,500; Referee: Beatriz Cuesta Arribas

== Semi-finals ==
=== Draw ===
The draw was completed by the RFEF on 9 February 2024, at the Centro Deportivo Municipal Luis Aragonés in Madrid.

=== Summary ===
Team 1	Agg.	Team 2	1st leg	2nd leg
Atlético Madrid	2–3	Real Sociedad	1–1	1–2
Athletic Bilbao	1–5	Barcelona	0–3	1–2

=== Matches ===
6 March 2024
19:00 CET (UTC+1)

Atlético Madrid	1–1	Real Sociedad
García 90+1'	Report	Sarriegi 64'

Centro Deportivo Wanda, Alcalá de Henares
Attendance: 1,071
Referee: Paola Cebollada López
12 March 2024
19:00 CET (UTC+1)

Real Sociedad	2–1	Atlético Madrid
Franssi 18'; Jensen 60'	Report	Sheila 62'

Reale Arena, San Sebastián
Attendance: 15,265
Referee: Marta Huerta de Aza

Real Sociedad won 3–2 on aggregate.

7 March 2024
19:00 CET (UTC+1)

Athletic Bilbao	0–3	Barcelona
	Report	Bonmatí 14', 16'; Paralluelo 78'

San Mamés, Bilbao
Attendance: 23,490
Referee: Elisabeth Calvo Valentín
14 March 2024
21:00 CET (UTC+1)

Barcelona	2–1	Athletic Bilbao
Mariona 19'; Patri 72'	Report	Pinedo 63'

Estadi Johan Cruyff, Sant Joan Despí
Attendance: 5,225
Referee: Zulema González González

Barcelona won 5–1 on aggregate.

== Final ==
18 May 2024
19:00 CEST (UTC+2)

Real Sociedad	0–8	Barcelona
	Report	Batlle 5', 33'; Paralluelo 13'; Hansen 19', 26'; Mariona 48', 58'; Pina 52'

La Romareda, Zaragoza
Attendance: 25,617
Referee: María Eugenia Gil Soriano

== Top goalscorers ==
Rank	Player	Club	Goals
1	(Spain) Mariona	Barcelona	6
2	(Spain) Aitana Bonmatí	Barcelona	4
2	(Spain) Salma Paralluelo	Barcelona	4
4	(Norway) Caroline Graham Hansen	Barcelona	3
4	(Spain) Ona Batlle	Barcelona	3
4	(Finland) Sanni Franssi	Real Sociedad	3
4	(Spain) Edna Imade	Granada	3
4	(Spain) Elsa López	Real Unión de Tenerife	3
