= 2016–17 FC Barcelona Femení season =

FC Barcelona Femení
2016–17 season
- Chairman: Josep Maria Bartomeu
- Manager: Xavi Llorens
- Stadium: Mini Estadi / Ciutat Esportiva Joan Gamper
- (Spain) Primera División: Second
- (Spain) Copa de la Reina: Winner
- (Europe) Champions League: Semifinalist
- (Catalonia) Copa Catalunya: Winner
Home colours	Away colours	Third colours

The 2016–17 season was the 29th season in the history of FC Barcelona Femení and 16th season as FC Barcelona's official women's football section. It was the last of eleven seasons managed by Xavi Llorens. Barcelona became the first Spanish team to reach the semifinals of the UEFA Women's Champions League in its fifth appearance on a row in the competition.

== Summary ==
=== Background and preseason ===
In 2015–16 Barcelona had ended the season with no titles for the first time since the 2009–10 season: Athletic Bilbao had won the league by a one-point margin and Atlético Madrid defeated Barcelona in the national cup's final. To strengthen the team Barcelona signed Andressa Alves from Montpellier and Line Røddik Hansen from European champion Olympique Lyonnais (though she hadn't taken part in the European campaign as she had started the 2015–16 season in Rosengård) as well as Ange N'Guessan, the team's first African player. Leila Ouahabi returned after three seasons in Valencia, and with the season started Vicky Losada also rejoined Barça following the end of the English championship. On the other hand, the Garrote sisters and Cristina Baudet were transferred to nearby Espanyol, Andrea Falcón and Esther Romero to rivals Atlético and Valencia and Andreia Norton returned to Portugal.

=== Season ===
Barcelona started the season with nine consecutive victories on a 34–1 goal-average before conceding a draw against newly promoted Betis. Next it defeated defending champion Athletic, which was already falling behind in the table. The team ended 2016 with a draw against Valencia and a 2–1 defeat against Atlético in Vicente Calderón before a crowd of 13,935, losing the lead in the table to the latter. Meanwhile, Barça had made it to the Champions League's quarterfinals after overcoming Minsk and Twente (which they had already faced in the same round in the previous season) with wide away wins. Next they faced quarterfinals-regular Rosengård.

With Atlético remaining unbeaten, a 2–0 defeat against Santa Teresa kept Barcelona away from the lead. However the team then chained an 11-wins streak and reached Atlético in the top of the table in April with 5 games remaining. In the meantime Barcelona defeated Rosengård both in Barcelona and Malmö, becoming the first Spanish team to reach the Champions League's semifinals, where they lost both games against Paris Saint-Germain, which had already ousted them in the past season's quarterfinals. Following the elimination Barcelona attained its largest win in the season, a 13–0 victory over Oiartzun, which would end relegated.

After defeating Valencia in Paterna and with long-time manager Xavi Llorens having just announced stepping down the position following the end of the season, Barcelona faced undefeated Atlético in the second-to-last game on equal points and a much larger goal average: a win would make them either mathematically or virtually champions. However the game ended in a 1–1 draw, and Barcelona was forced to depend on an Atlético blunder. Not only did Atlético defeat Real Sociedad but Barcelona lost 2–1 to Levante and thus they again ended the championship as runners-up with 75 points, their least in the 16-team Primera División by one point. On the other hand, Jennifer Hermoso was the competition's top scorer with 35 goals, the major goal-scoring record by a Barcelona player in the same period.

In the Copa de la Reina Barcelona qualified for the Final Four in the Ciudad del Fútbol after overcoming Real Sociedad in the extra time. There it first defeated Valencia in the semifinals before facing Atlético in a rematch of the previous edition's final, which Barcelona had lost 3–2. However, this time Barcelona defeated Atlético 4–1 and won its first nationwide title since the 2014–15 League.

== Transfers ==
In
Date	Position	Player	Moving from	Reference	Notes
June 28, 2016	Midfielder	(Brazil) Andressa Alves	(France) Montpellier	Marca	
June 29, 2016	Defender	(Spain) Leila Ouahabi	(Spain) Valencia	Sport	
July 2, 2016	Goalkeeper	(Spain) Andrea Giménez	(Spain) Espanyol	Mundo Deportivo	
July 8, 2016	Defender	(Denmark) Line Røddik Hansen	(France) Olympique Lyonnais	Mundo Deportivo	
August 12, 2016	Forward	(Ivory Coast) Ange N'Guessan	(Cyprus) Apollon Limassol	Mundo Deportivo	
November 11, 2016	Midfielder	(Spain) Vicky Losada	(England) Arsenal	As	

Out
Date	Position	Player	Moving to	Reference	Notes
June 29, 2016	Midfielder	(Spain) Esther Romero	(Spain) Valencia	Superdeporte	
June 30, 2016	Goalkeeper	(United States) Kaeli Anne Schmidt	(Spain) Levante Las Planas	La Vanguardia	
June 30, 2016	Forward	(Spain) Cristina Baudet	(Spain) Espanyol	FC Barcelona	
July 4, 2016	Defender	(Spain) Núria Garrote	(Spain) Espanyol	Futfem	
July 4, 2016	Midfielder	(Spain) Pilar Garrote	(Spain) Espanyol	Futfem	
July 6, 2016	Forward	(Spain) Andrea Falcón	(Spain) Atlético Madrid	Mundo Deportivo	
August 2, 2016	Midfielder	(Portugal) Andreia Norton	(Portugal) Braga	Braga TV	

== Squad ==
=== First team ===
Note: Flags indicate national team as defined under FIFA eligibility rules. Players may hold more than one non-FIFA nationality.

No.	Pos.	Nat.	Name	Age	Since	App.	Goals
Goalkeepers
1	GK	(Spain)	Laura Ràfols (second captain)	26	2007		0
13	GK	(Spain)	Sandra Paños	24	2015	60	0
25	GK	(Spain)	Andrea Giménez		2016	1	0
Defenders
5	DF	(Spain)	Melanie Serrano (third captain)	27	2003		
4	DF	(Spain)	Marta Unzué (captain)	28	2006		
18	DF	(Spain)	Marta Torrejón	27	2013	158	11
3	DF	(Spain)	Ruth García	30	2013	154	11
23	DF	(Spain)	Leire Landa	30	2014	38	0
2	DF	(Spain)	Ane Bergara	30	2015	45	4
15	DF	(Spain)	Leila Ouahabi		2011		
6	DF	(Denmark)	Line Røddik Hansen		2016	29	1
Midfielders
16	MF	(Spain)	Vicky Losada		2006		
8	MF	(Spain)	Míriam Diéguez	31	2011		
7	MF	(Spain)	Gemma Gili	23	2012		
11	MF	(Spain)	Alexia Putellas	23	2012		
17	MF	(Spain)	Irene del Río	25	2015	42	10
12	MF	(Spain)	Patricia Guijarro	19	2015	61	11
22	MF	(Brazil)	Andressa Alves		2016	26	9
24	MF	(Spain)	Aitana Bonmatí	19	2016	21	5
Forwards
20	FW	(Spain)	Olga García	25	2010		
10	FW	(Spain)	Jenni Hermoso	27	2013	124	93
14	FW	(Spain)	Sandra Hernández	20	2014	37	8
9	FW	(Spain)	Mariona Caldentey	21	2014	70	20
19	FW	(Spain)	Bárbara Latorre	24	2015	69	27
21	FW	(Ivory Coast)	Ange N'Guessan		2016	20	4

- Source: FCBarcelona.com
- Ordered by arrival.

=== Reserve team ===
Players from the B team eligible to train and play with the main squad.

Note: Flags indicate national team as defined under FIFA eligibility rules; some limited exceptions apply. Players may hold more than one non-FIFA nationality.

No.	Pos.	Nation	Player
—	DF	ESP	Ona Batlle
—	DF	ESP	Laia Aleixandri
—	MF	ESP	Nerea Valeriano
—	MF	ESP	Laura Martínez

== Friendlies ==
13 August 2016 Friendly	Seagull	0–3	Barcelona	Badalona
19:00		Report	Hernández 35', 59'; Latorre 85'	Stadium: Travessera de Montigalà

=== ASPTT Summer Tour ===
19 August 2016 ASPTT Summer Tour	Montpellier (France)	1–2	Barcelona	Albi, France
19:00	Larent 90'	Report	Latorre 46', 61'	Stadium: Maurice Rigaud

21 August 2016 ASPTT Summer Tour	Albi (France)	0–2	Barcelona	Albi, France
17:00		Report	N'Guessan 26'; Hermoso 65'	Stadium: Maurice Rigaud

== Competitions ==
Win Draw Loss Postponed
Numbers in brackets in league games show the team's position in the table following the match

=== Pre-season ===
==== Copa Catalunya ====
26 August 2016 Semifinal	Barcelona	20–0	Pontenc	Mollet del Vallés
20:00	O. García 11', 27', 39'; Caldentey 15', 41'; Putellas 19', 25', 66'; Latorre 48', 54', 60'; Røddik Hansen 51', 72'; Hermoso 57', 75', 82', 86'; Bergara 62'; Bonmatí 81'; Serrano 85'	Report	Marina Peya (yellow card) 42'	Stadium: Germans Gonzalvo; Attendance: 1,000; Referee: Cecilia Muñoz Di Giovambattis

28 August 2016 Final	Barcelona	6–0	Espanyol	Mollet del Vallés
12:00	Hermoso 12'; Torrejón 55'; Putellas 62'; Bonmatí 68'; O. García 74'; Caldentey 86'	Report	Elba Vergès (yellow card) 17'; Zaira Flores (yellow card) 56'; Inés Juan (yellow card) 88'	Stadium: Germans Gonzalvo; Attendance: 500; Referee: Paula Líndez Ciurana

=== Primera División ===
==== Results summary ====
Overall								Home						Away					
Pld	W	D	L	GF	GA	GD	Pts	W	D	L	GF	GA	GD	W	D	L	GF	GA	GD
30	24	3	3	98	13	+85	75	13	2	0	61	4	+57	11	1	3	37	9	+28

Source: Soccerway

==== Results by round ====
Round	1	2	3	4	5	6	7	8	9	10	11	12	13	14	15	16	17	18	19	20	21	22	23	24	25	26	27	28	29	30
Ground	A	H	H	A	H	A	H	A	H	A	H	A	H	A	H	H	A	A	H	A	H	A	H	A	H	A	H	A	H	A
Result	W	W	W	W	W	W	W	W	W	D	W	W	D	L	W	W	L	W	W	W	W	W	W	W	W	W	W	W	D	L
Position	2	1	1	1	1	1	1	1	1	1	1	1	1	2	2	2	2	2	2	2	2	2	2	2	1	1	1	1	2	2

Updated to match(es) played on 20 May 2017. Source: La Liga
A = Away; H = Home; W = Win; D = Draw; L = Loss; P = Postponed

==== League table ====
Pos	Team	Pld	W	D	L	GF	GA	GD	Pts	Qualification or relegation
1	Atlético de Madrid (C)	30	24	6	0	91	17	+74	78	Qualification for the UEFA Champions League and Copa de la Reina
2	Barcelona	30	24	3	3	98	13	+85	75	Qualification for the UEFA Champions League and Copa de la Reina
3	Valencia	30	20	8	2	69	11	+58	68	Qualification for the Copa de la Reina
4	Levante	30	18	3	9	53	49	+4	57	Qualification for the Copa de la Reina
5	Athletic Club	30	16	5	9	64	44	+20	53	Qualification for the Copa de la Reina

Source: Futbolme
Rules for classification: 1) points; 2) head-to-head points; 3) goal difference; 4) number of goals scored
(C) Champions

==== Matches ====
4 September 2016 1	(15) Granadilla	0–4	Barcelona	El Médano
13:00		Report	Hermoso 46'; O. García 51', 59' del Río 88'	Stadium: La Hoya del Pozo; Referee: Negrín Díaz

11 September 2016 2	Barcelona	6–0	Santa Teresa (8)	Sant Joan Despí
16:00	Putellas 15'; Hermoso 18', 46'; Unzué 28', 66'; O. García 29'	Report		Stadium: Joan Gamper; Referee: Sánchez Rico

25 September 2016 3	Barcelona	2–0	Real Sociedad (11)	Sant Joan Despí
16:00	Putellas 27'; O. García 80'	Report		Stadium: Joan Gamper; Referee: Muñoz Pérez

2 October 2016 4	(16) Rayo Vallecano	0–4	Barcelona	Madrid
16:00		Report	Putellas 40', 45+1', 60'; N'Guessan 81'	Stadium: Rayo Vallecano

9 October 2016 5	Barcelona	3–0	Zaragoza (14)	Barcelona
16:00		Report	Hermoso 83', 90+1'; Putellas 87'	Stadium: Mini Estadi; Referee: Bosch Domenech

15 October 2016 7	Barcelona	7–0	Albacete (14)	Barcelona
10:45	O. García 18', 19', 45'; Hernández 21'; Putellas 61'; Hermoso 67', 81'	Report		Stadium: Mini Estadi; Referee: Escriche Guzmán

30 October 2016 8	(9) Sporting Huelva	0–1	Barcelona	Huelva
11:30		Report	Serrano 83'	Stadium: La Orden; Referee: Hernández Maeso

2 November 2016 6	(16) Espanyol	1–6	Barcelona	Sant Joan Despí
20:30	Pérez 34'	Report	Gili 16', 49'; Hermoso 18', 40', 52'; Latorre 66'	Stadium: Dani Jarque; Attendance: 400; Referee: Navarro Collados

6 November 2016 9	Barcelona	3–0	Tacuense (15)	Sant Joan Despí
16:00	Putellas 20'; N'Guessan 64'; Latorre 75'	Report		Stadium: Joan Gamper; Referee: Sureda Cuenca

13 November 2016 10	(12) Betis	1–1	Barcelona	Sevilla
16:00	Moreno 77'	Report	O. García 13'	Stadium: Luis del Sol; Referee: García Gómez

20 November 2016 11	Barcelona	2–1	Athletic Bilbao (6)	Sant Joan Despí
16:00	Losada 16'; Hermoso 72' (pen.)	Report	Vázquez 25' (pen.)	Stadium: Joan Gamper; Referee: Monter Solans

3 December 2016 12	(15) Oiartzun	0–1	Barcelona	Oiartzun
10:45		Report	Hermoso 26'	Stadium: Karla Lekuona; Referee: Galech Apezteguía

7 December 2016 13	Barcelona	1–1	Valencia (4)	Sant Joan Despí
18:00	Alves 3'	Report	Vilas 75'	Stadium: Joan Gamper; Referee: Leo Ollo

11 December 2016 14	(1) Atlético Madrid	2–1	Barcelona	Madrid
12:00	Corredera 27'; Bermúdez 38'	Report	Alves 61'	Stadium: Vicente Calderón; Attendance: 13,935; Referee: Alemán Pérez

8 January 2017 15	Barcelona	4–0	Levante (3)	Barcelona
16:00	Alves 10'; Latorre 72'; Hermoso 75'; N'Guessan 77'	Report		Stadium: Mini Estadi; Attendance: 565; Referee: González González

15 January 2017 16	Barcelona	3–0	Granadilla (6)	Sant Joan Despí
16:00	Losada 17'; Hermoso 29', 38'	Report		Stadium: Joan Gamper; Referee: Ripoll Solano

28 January 2017 17	(8) Santa Teresa	2–0	Barcelona	Badajoz
16:00	Torre 27'; Martín 78'	Report		Stadium: El Viejo Vivero; Referee: Milla Alvéndiz

11 February 2017 18	(10) Real Sociedad	0–3	Barcelona	Usurbil
10:45		Report	Hermoso 41'; Alves 58'; O. García 87'	Stadium: Zubieta; Referee: Usón Rosel

19 February 2017 19	Barcelona	3–0	Rayo Vallecano (8)	Barcelona
16:00	Guijarro 34'; Alves 88'; Unzué 90+1'	Report		Stadium: Mini Estadi; Referee: Varón Aceitón

25 February 2017 20	(12) Zaragoza	0–6	Barcelona	Zaragoza
16:00		Report	Caldentey 43'; O. García 56'; Latorre 73'; Gili 79', 85' del Río 86'	Stadium: Pedro Sancho; Referee: Gómez Landazábal

11 March 2017 21	Barcelona	5–0	Espanyol (15)	Barcelona
16:00	Alves 39'; Hermoso 44', 59'; Losada 52'; Latorre 68'	Report		Stadium: Mini Estadi; Referee: Herrero Arenas

18 March 2017 22	(14) Albacete	0–2	Barcelona	Albacete
10:45		Report	Hermoso 39', 90+2'	Stadium: Andrés Iniesta; Referee: Campos Salinas

11 March 2017 23	Barcelona	5–1	Sporting Huelva (10)	Barcelona
16:00	García 8'; Caldentey 19'; Guijarro 32'; Losada 47'; Hermoso 90+1'	Report	Hernández 63'	Stadium: Mini Estadi; Referee: Miralles Selma

2 April 2017 24	(14) Tacuense	1–2	Barcelona	San Cristóbal de la Laguna
12:30	Carballo 61'	Report	Hermoso 18', 66'	Stadium: Pablos Abril; Referee: Gálvez Rascón

16 April 2017 25	Barcelona	3–0	Betis (12)	Sant Joan Despí
16:00	Hermoso 28'; Putellas 44', 71'	Report		Stadium: Joan Gamper; Referee: Navarro Collados

25 April 2017 26	(5) Athletic Bilbao	0–4	Barcelona	Lezama
18:30		Report	Hermoso 45', 52', 65'; O. García 90+2'	Stadium: Lezama Facilities; Referee: López Toca

2 May 2017 27	Barcelona	13–0	Oiartzun (14)	Sant Joan Despí
12:00	Caldentey 11'; Hermoso 16', 18', 28', 43', 62', 74'; Bonmatí 32', 37'; Alves 55'; O. García 60', 68'; Latorre 80'	Report		Stadium: Joan Gamper; Referee: Fernández Vidal

6 May 2017 28	(3) Valencia	0–1	Barcelona	Paterna
16:00		Report	Unzué 58'	Stadium: Antoni Puchades; Referee: Collado López

13 May 2017 29	Barcelona	1–1	Atlético Madrid (1)	Barcelona
17:15	Hermoso 69'	Report	Bermúdez 59' (pen.)	Stadium: Mini Estadi; Attendance: 6,268; Referee: Pérez Peraza

20 May 2017 30	(4) Levante	2–1	Barcelona	Paiporta
12:00	Calderón 24'; Prim 64'	Report	Hermoso 9'	Stadium: El Terrer; Referee: Sánchez López

=== UEFA Women's Champions League ===
==== Knockout rounds ====
6 October 2016 Round of 32 – 1	Minsk (Belarus)	0–3	Barcelona	Minsk, Belarus
15:00	Shatsilenia (yellow card) 43'	Report	Hermoso 5', 90+1'; Torrejón 32'	Stadium: FC Minsk; Attendance: 2,300; Referee: (France) Guillemin

12 October 2016 Round of 32 – 2	Barcelona	2–1	(Belarus) Minsk	Barcelona
19:00	Hermoso 61' (pen.); Gemma (yellow card) 69'; Alves 75'	Report	Ayinde (yellow card) 10'; Njolle (yellow card) 38'; Ogbiagbevha 51'; Borisenko (yellow card) 60'; Ebi (yellow card) 84'	Stadium: Mini Estadi; Attendance: 1,201; Referee: (Bulgaria) Milkova

9 November 2016 Round of 16 – 1	Barcelona	1–0	(Netherlands) Twente	Barcelona
18:30	Hermoso 10'	Report	Munsterman (yellow card) 74'; Roord (yellow card) 90'	Stadium: Mini Estadi; Attendance: 1,051; Referee: (Germany) Steinhaus

16 November 2016 Round of 16 – 2	Twente (Netherlands)	0–4	Barcelona	Enschede, Netherlands
19:00	Worm (yellow card) 70'	Report	Torrejón 18'; Alves 37' (yellow card) 59'; Latorre 79'; N'Guessan 86'	Stadium: De Grolsch Veste; Attendance: 7,035; Referee: (Greece) Mitsi

22 March 2017 Quarterfinals – 1	Rosengård (Sweden)	0–1	Barcelona	Malmö, Sweden
19:00		Report	Ouahabi 45+1'; Losada (yellow card) 77'	Stadium: Idrottsplats; Attendance: 5,037; Referee: (France) Frappart

29 March 2017 Quarterfinals – 2	Barcelona	2–0	(Sweden) Rosengård	Barcelona
18:30	Hermoso 52' (yellow card) 85'; Røddik (yellow card) 63'; Caldentey 90+4' (yellow card) 78'	Report	Asante (yellow card) 74'; Masar (yellow card) 85'; S. Troelsgaard (yellow card) 90+1'	Stadium: Mini Estadi; Attendance: 7,350; Referee: (Ukraine) Monzul

22 April 2017 Semifinals – 1	Barcelona	1–3	(France) Paris Saint-Germain	Barcelona
18:00	Latorre 89'	Report	Delie 26'; Delannoy (yellow card) 31'; Cristiane 36'; Cruz 53'	Stadium: Mini Estadi; Attendance: 10,352; Referee: (Romania) Albon

29 April 2017 Semifinals – 2	Paris Saint-Germain (France)	2–0	Barcelona	Paris, France
18:00	George (yellow card) 22'; Delannoy 55' (pen.); Diéguez 61' (o.g.)	Report	Paños (yellow card) 55'; Losada (yellow card) 81'	Stadium: Parc des Princes; Attendance: 19,192; Referee: (Czech Republic) Adámková

=== Post-season ===
==== Copa de la Reina ====
3 June 2017 Quarterfinals	Barcelona	1–0 (a.e.t.)	Real Sociedad	S. Sebastián de los Reyes
10:00	Latorre 102'; Gili (yellow card)	Report		Stadium: Matapiñonera; Referee: Contreras Patiño

16 June 2017 Semifinals	Barcelona	2–1	Valencia	Las Rozas de Madrid
17:00	Gili 21'; Losada 27'	Report	Vilas 90+4'; Carreras (yellow card)	Stadium: Ciudad del Fútbol; Referee: Ortiz Arias

18 June 2017 Final	Barcelona	4–1	Atlético Madrid	Las Rozas de Madrid
11:30	Hermoso 41', 48'; Putellas 70'; Bonmatí 83'	Report	Bermúdez 57'	Stadium: Ciudad del Fútbol; Referee: Hernández Maeso

== Statistics ==
=== Overall ===
As of 18 June 2017

No..	Pos.	Nat.	Player	Primera División		Copa de la Reina		Copa Catalunya		Champions League		Total		Discipline		Notes
No..	Pos.	Nat.	Player	Apps	Goals	Apps	Goals	Apps	Goals	Apps	Goals	Apps	Goals	Yellow card	Red card	Notes
Goalkeepers
1	GK	(Spain)	Laura Ràfols	7	0	0	0	0+1	0	1	0	9	0	0	0	
13	GK	(Spain)	Sandra Paños	23	0	3	0	1	0	7	0	34	0	2	0	
25	GK	(Spain)	Andrea Giménez	0	0	0	0	1	0	0	0	1	0	0	0	
Defenders
2	DF	(Spain)	Ane Bergara	3	0	0	0	1	1	0	0	4	1	0	0	
3	DF	(Spain)	Ruth García	25	0	3	0	2	0	7	0	37	0	7	0	
4	DF	(Spain)	Marta Unzué	23+2	4	3	0	1+1	0	8	0	38	4	1	0	
5	DF	(Spain)	Melanie Serrano	17+2	1	1	0	1+1	0	4	0	26	1	3	0	
6	DF	(Denmark)	Line Røddik Hansen	18+1	0	0	0	1+1	1	8	0	29	1	3	0	
15	DF	(Spain)	Leila Ouahabi	19+3	0	3	0	1+1	1	7	1	34	2	0	0	
18	DF	(Spain)	Marta Torrejón	24+3	0	3	0	1	1	8	2	39	3	1	0	
23	DF	(Spain)	Leire Landa	0	0	0	0	0	0	0	0	0	0	0	0	
Midfielders
7	MF	(Spain)	Gemma Gili	10+8	4	2+1	1	1	0	3+2	0	27	5	2	0	
8	MF	(Spain)	Míriam Diéguez	18+5	0	1	0	1+1	0	5	0	31	0	2	0	
11	MF	(Spain)	Alexia Putellas	27+2	10	3	1	2	4	8	0	42	15	1	0	
12	MF	(Spain)	Patricia Guijarro	14+6	2	1+1	0	1+1	0	0+4	0	28	2	0	0	
16	MF	(Spain)	Vicky Losada	20	4	3	1	0	0	4	0	27	5	2	0	
17	MF	(Spain)	Irene del Río	5+6	2	0+2	0	1+1	2	0	0	15	4	0	0	
22	MF	(Brazil)	Andressa Alves	15+5	7	1	0	0	0	5	2	26	9	3	0	
24	MF	(Spain)	Aitana Bonmatí	3+10	2	0+1	1	1+1	2	0+1	0	17	5	1	0	
Forwards
9	FW	(Spain)	Mariona Caldentey	14+4	3	3	0	1+1	3	2+2	0	27	6	1	0	
10	FW	(Spain)	Jenni Hermoso	26+1	35	3	2	1+1	5	8	4	40	46	2	0	
14	FW	(Spain)	Sandra Hernández	2+2	1	0	0	1	0	0	0	5	1	1	0	
19	FW	(Spain)	Bárbara Latorre	2+21	6	0+3	1	1+1	2	0+7	2	34	11	1	0	
20	FW	(Spain)	Olga García	14+13	14	0+3	0	1+1	4	3+2	0	37	18	1	0	
21	FW	(Ivory Coast)	Ange N'Guessan	4+15	3	0	0	0	0	0+2	1	20	4	0	0	
Own goals (1)
