= Raquel Peña =

Raquel Peña may refer to:

- Raquel Peña (politician) (born 1966), Dominican politician and academic
- Raquel Peña (footballer) (born 1988), Spanish footballer
