= Landaluze =

Landaluze is a surname of Basque origin. Notable people with that name include:

- Iñigo Landaluze (born 1977), Spanish cyclist
- Naia Landaluze (born 2000), Spanish footballer
- Víctor Patricio de Landaluze (1828–1889), Spanish-born painter active in Cuba
