= Aitana Bonmatí =

Spanish footballer (born 1998)

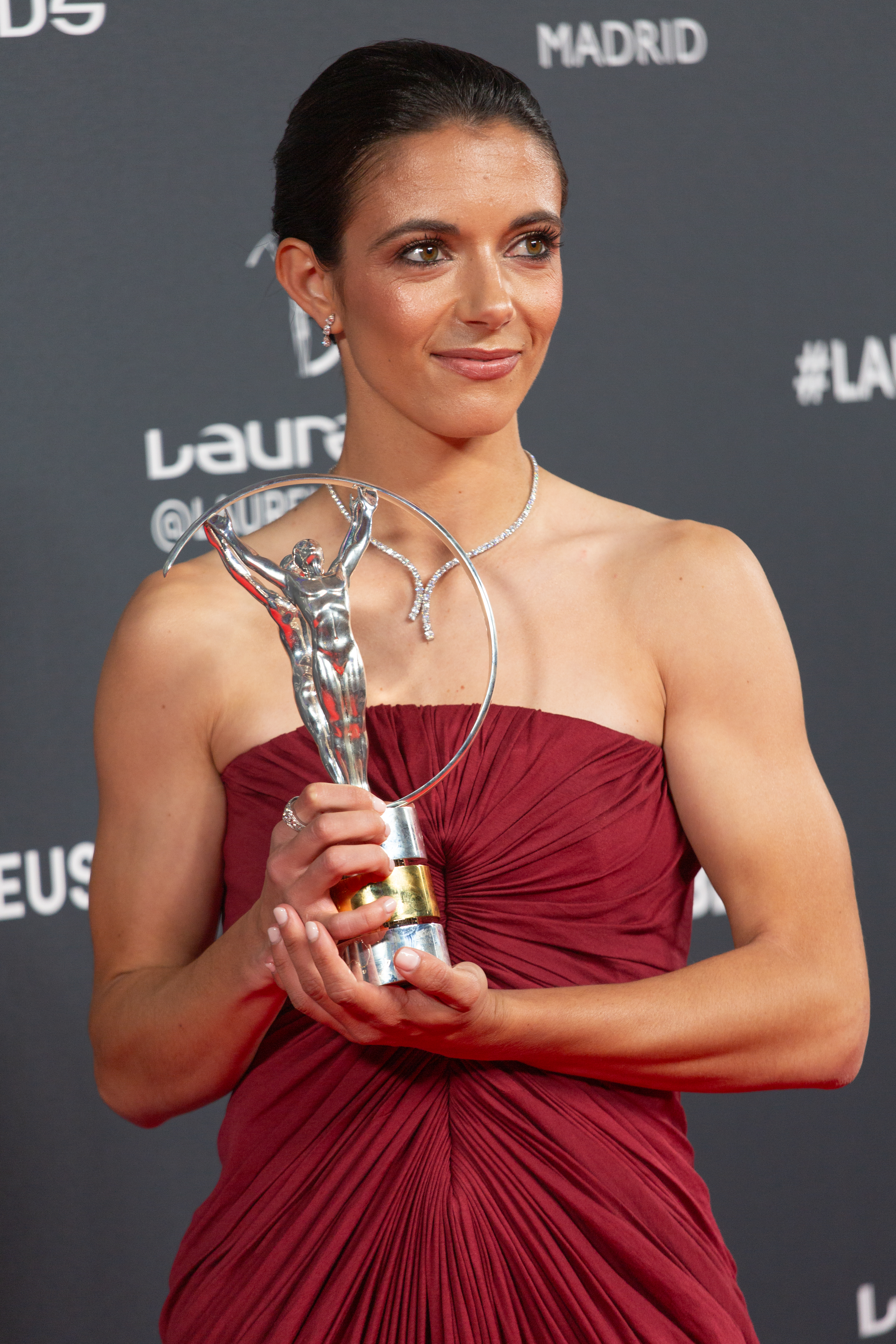
- Bonmatí in 2024

Personal information
- Full name: Aitana Bonmatí i Conca
- Birth name: Aitana Bonmatí Guidonet
- Date of birth: 18 January 1998 (age 28)
- Place of birth: Vilanova i la Geltrú, Catalonia, Spain
- Height: 1.62 m (5 ft 4 in)
- Position: Midfielder

Team information
- Current team: Barcelona
- Number: 14

Youth career
- 2005–2009: Ribes
- 2010–2012: Cubelles
- 2012–2015: Barcelona

Senior career*
Years	Team	Apps	(Gls)
2014–2016	Barcelona B		
2016–	Barcelona	215	(78)

International career^{‡}
2013–2015	Spain U17	13	(3)
2015–2017	Spain U19	15	(6)
2016–2018	Spain U20	9	(2)
2017–2019	Catalonia	2	(1)
2017–	Spain	83	(31)
Medal record
Women's football
Representing Spain
FIFA Women's World Cup
Winner	2023 Australia–New Zealand
UEFA Women's Championship
Runner-up	2025 Switzerland
UEFA Women's Nations League
Winner	2024 France–Netherlands–Spain
FIFA U-20 Women's World Cup
Runner-up	2018 France
UEFA Women's Under-19 Championship
Winner	2017 Northern Ireland
Runner-up	2016 Slovakia
FIFA U-17 Women's World Cup
Runner-up	2014 Costa Rica
UEFA Women's Under-17 Championship
Winner	2015 Iceland
Runner-up	2014 England
- * Club domestic league appearances and goals as of 05:32, 23 November 2025 (UTC) ‡ National team caps and goals as of 22:15, 23 July 2025 (UTC)

Aitana Bonmatí i Conca (Note: Per the council of Catalonia and the government of Bonmatí's hometown (and other Catalan sources) her full name in Catalan is Aitana Bonmatí i Conca.) (Catalan: [əjˈtanə ˌβɔmməˈti j ˈkoŋkə]; (Note: Catalan: in isolation, Bonmatí is pronounced [ˌbɔmməˈti]. Spanish: [ajˈtana βommaˈti]; in isolation, Bonmatí is pronounced [bommaˈti].) born 18 January 1998) is a Spanish professional footballer from Catalonia who plays as a midfielder for Liga F club Barcelona and the Spain national team. She has also represented Catalonia. Having won all major club and individual awards available to a European player by 2023, including the most-decorated season of any footballer ever for 2022–23, she is considered one of the best players in women's football, and one of the greatest of all time.

Bonmatí has been with Barcelona since 2012, developing through La Masia for six years. She was promoted to Barcelona's first team ahead of the 2016–17 season, and made off-the-bench appearances for the club until her break-out year in the 2018–19 season. With the team she has won seven league titles, eight Copas de la Reina, five Supercopas, four Copas Catalunyas and four UEFA Women's Champions League titles, including three trebles and a continental quadruple. She was named MVP of the final when Barcelona won their first Champions League in 2021, before becoming the centre of the team in their 2022–23 and 2023–24 seasons. She followed teammate Alexia Putellas in winning multiple major individual titles, winning the Ballon d'Or Féminin in 2023, 2024, 2025 (making her the first player to win the award three times and three times in a row), The Best FIFA Women's Player Award in 2023 and 2024, and the UEFA Women's Player of the Year in 2023, after which it was merged with the Ballon d'Or Féminin.

Internationally, Bonmatí found success with Spain's under-17, under-19 and under-20 women's teams. She has won two UEFA Women's Youth Championships – in 2015 with the under-17 team and 2017 with the under-19s – and has been runner-up in two FIFA Youth Women's World Cups – in 2014 with the under-17s and 2018 with the under-20s. She moved into the senior squad in 2017, featuring for Spain at the 2019 Women's World Cup and 2022 Women's Euro. She then had a starring role in the 2023 World Cup, where Spain won the title and she won the Golden Ball as the tournament's best player, and in the 2024 UEFA Women's Nations League Finals, where Spain again won and she was voted Player of the Finals. In 2024, she won the Laureus World Sports Award for Sportswoman of the Year, the first footballer to win the award.

== Early and personal life ==
Aitana Bonmatí was born on 18 January 1998 in Vilanova i la Geltrú, the capital of the Garraf comarca of Catalonia, to Vicent Conca i Ferrús and Rosa Bonmatí Guidonet. She was raised in Sant Pere de Ribes in Garraf. Her parents are teachers of Catalan language and literature, and instilled a love of reading in her from an early age.

Her parents were involved in the movement to abandon Spanish naming customs (which had the paternal surname being listed first), but could not legally do so when Bonmatí was born. Her mother initially registered as a single parent and for the first two years of her life she was known as Aitana Bonmatí Guidonet. During this time her parents campaigned and took a case to parliament to change Bonmatí's name, seeking advice from Imma Mayol and legal experts to form a proposal to change the legislation. In May 1999, when Spain was on the verge of changing the law, Rosa Bonmatí appeared on Bon dia, Catalunya to present the argument in favour. The law was changed in late 1999 and ratified in early 2000; Bonmatí was one of the first people in Spain to have her maternal surname as her first surname, and her paternal surname (Conca) as her second surname. In 2023, Bonmatí honoured her parents, saying: "You fought for change and you succeeded, I carry that fight and resilience in my blood."

Her father is Valencian and had been part of the Catalan Countries independence party Movement for Defence of the Land, and reportedly a member of the Catalan nationalist paramilitary group Terra Lliure; he was among those arrested and, by their accounts, tortured ahead of the 1992 Summer Olympics as part of Operation Garzón. Acquitted in the resulting trial, Conca was part of the case that saw the Spanish state convicted in the European Court of Human Rights for violating the Convention Against Torture. Due to her family's outspoken Marxist views, Bonmatí has been the subject of criticism from people of various alignments. Right-wing Spanish nationalists, such as Federico Jiménez Losantos, have criticized her for supporting "terrorism," while socialist separatists have accused her of insufficiently continuing her family's embrace of Catalan independence.

Bonmatí played basketball in her childhood, but began playing football on the playground at school and decided she preferred this at the age of seven. Her father noted her to be competitive and self-critical since she was a young child, and worried that she did not enjoy playing due to being too focused on achieving more; Bonmatí said in 2023 that she is "never happy with what I do because I always want more." She is a lifelong fan of FC Barcelona, and would watch the men's games at a local bar in Ribes in her childhood. After playing in local boys' teams, Bonmatí joined Barcelona's youth section at the age of 13, to play in their girls' teams. At the time, the girls' youth section did not have an on-site residential facility, and she had to travel on public transport (accompanied by her father) for the two-hour journey, as her father does not drive and her mother has fibromyalgia and chronic fatigue. Her idols growing up were Barcelona midfielders Xavi and Andrés Iniesta; by 2023, she had a close friendship with Xavi, who wrote that he was proud she had inherited the Barça DNA.

She has a flexitarian plant-based diet and puts a lot of focus on getting good rest. Since she was 13 she has visited a psychologist to "be good with [herself]", and advocates for taking care of mental health. Bonmatí also enjoys travelling as a means of disconnecting, and cites a trip to Vietnam as having had a profound effect. She studied physical activity and sports science at Ramon Llull University, graduating in 2021, and started a master's degree in sport management at the Johan Cruyff Institute in September 2022.

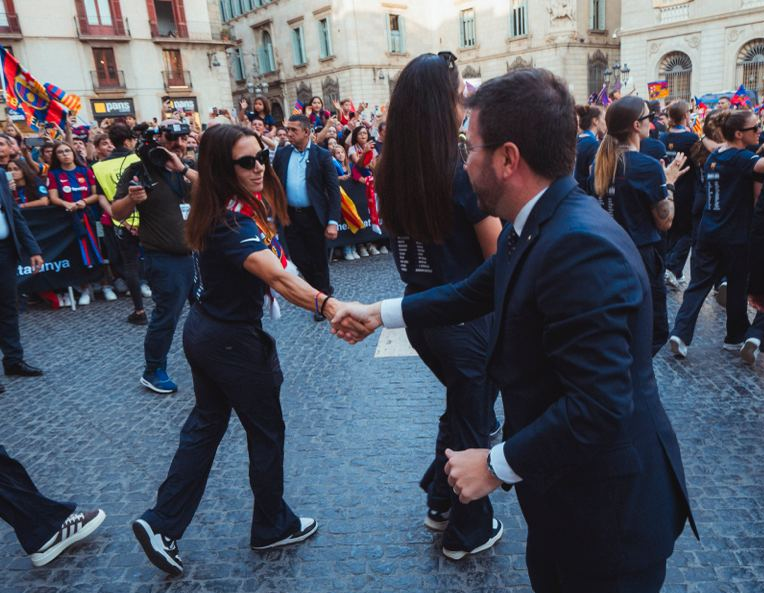
The Catalan president, Pere Aragonès (right), meeting Bonmatí in May 2024

Bonmatí's native language is Catalan; she also speaks Spanish and English. In 2023 she worked with Plataforma per la Llengua to campaign for the European Union (EU) to give Catalan official status in the EU, asking Petteri Orpo, the prime minister of Finland, to vote in favour. Bonmatí also works in activism to support the UN Refugee Agency.

== Club career ==
=== Youth career ===
==== Ribes and Cubelles, 2005–12 ====
Bonmatí joined the local CD Ribes team when she was seven, playing there for four years and improving greatly. Within the club there were around 400 boys, and Bonmatí was the only girl. She started out as a defender, due to her physicality and fearlessness in tackling, as well as her "ability to steal the ball and initiate attacks [that] showcased her strength on the pitch"; her first coach compared her to legendary Barcelona centre-back Carles Puyol but still moved her into the midfield to have more influence on attacking play. She then changed club and played for two years at CF Cubelles, as she liked their style of play; what she liked in football was playing on the ball and taking good touches, something she was able to do at Cubelles. The only girl in her youth teams, she was teased by the boys for her short stature. She appreciated playing in boys' teams, though, believing this helped improve her strength and intensity.

==== Barcelona, 2012–16 ====
Joining Barcelona as a teenager, Bonmatí started in their Juvenil-Cadet ranks, then the second-highest girls' development team. In 2013, with Juvenil-Cadet, Bonmatí won the respective league and Copa Catalunya competitions. The next season, she again won the league with Juvenil-Cadet, the team being undefeated. They lost the final of the Copa Catalunya on penalties; Bonmatí converted her penalty in their 2–4 shootout loss to Sant Gabriel. Despite her success, Bonmatí "wondered if it was worth all the effort" at times, considering the exhausting travel and mental toll. She also did not initially aspire to play football professionally, due to lack of any examples, even at Barcelona. While in the youth sections, Bonmatí heard about the professionalisation of women's football in the United States and made plans to go there to have a career, intending to join the University of Oregon programme. In 2015, Barcelona made its women's team professional, and Bonmatí decided to stay.

Bonmatí moved up to become a Barcelona B player after two years at the club. During her time with the B team, she sparingly made appearances for the first team in preseason. Throughout the 2015–16 season, Bonmatí played an important part in winning the championship of Segunda Division, Group III for the first time in the club's history, scoring fourteen goals. At the end of the season she was brought into the first team by manager Xavi Llorens.

=== Barcelona ===
==== 2015–16 ====
Bonmatí made her first team competitive debut at the end of the 2015–16 season during the quarter-finals of the 2016 Copa de la Reina against Real Sociedad, playing as a false 9 and providing an assist to Bárbara Latorre. She continued to feature in the tournament as a substitute, coming on late in the match during a 3–0 semi-final win against Levante. Bonmatí featured in the final against Atletico Madrid, subbing on for Gemma Gili in a match that finished a 2–3 loss for Barcelona.

==== 2016–17 ====
At the start of the 2016–17 season she played in both matches of the Copa Catalunya, also scoring in both. The final against Espanyol ended with a 6–0 win for Bonmatí's first senior title with the club. She made her UEFA Women's Champions League debut in the Round of 32 against FK Minsk. Bonmatí was used sparingly her first season with the senior team, making thirteen league appearances with three starts and scoring two goals – a brace against Oiartzun. She scored Barcelona's fourth goal in the final of the 2017 Copa de la Reina, a 4–1 win over Atlético Madrid.

==== 2017–18 ====
In the 2017–18 season, Bonmatí continued to sparingly make appearances, mostly in the league. Her only goal of the season was also her first ever Champions League goal in a Round of 16 match against Lithuanian club Gintra Universitetas. She came on for Toni Duggan in the 2018 Copa de la Reina final that went into extra-time and ended with a Barcelona win, her second major title with the club.

==== 2018–19 ====
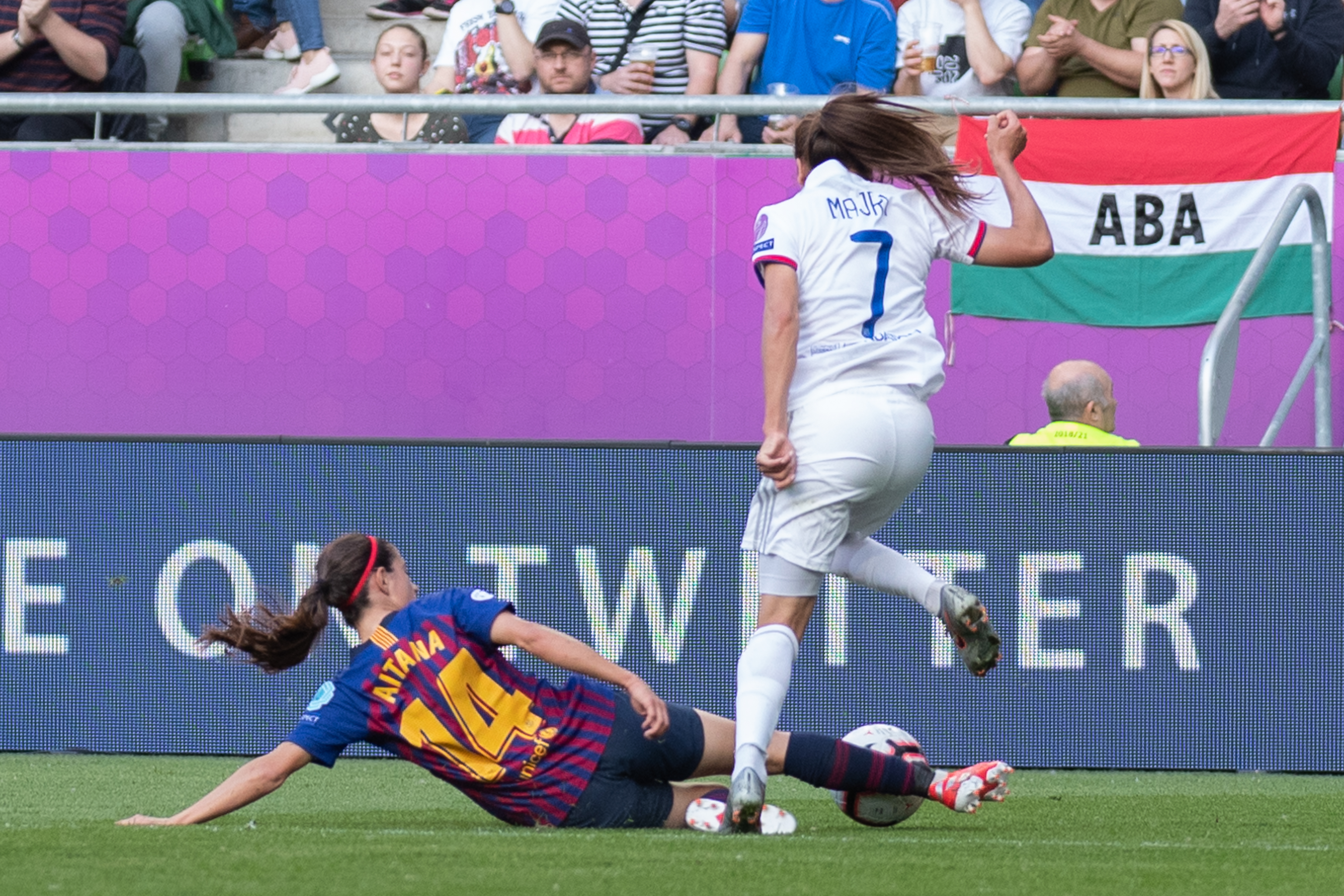
Bonmatí slide-tackling Amel Majri of Lyon during the 2019 UWCL Final

The 2018–19 season was a break-out season for Bonmatí as she consistently made first team appearances in Spain. She also made regular Champions League appearances, scoring once against Glasgow City in the Round of 16. Barcelona made it to their first ever Champions League final where she started the match, and despite a 4–1 loss to Lyon, she had a moment that went viral when she outran Shanice van de Sanden down the right-wing to prevent a counter-attack. Bonmatí ended her season with twelve league goals and played all but 5 matches in all competitions.

==== 2019–20 ====
Despite an approach from Bayern Munich, Bonmatí signed a new contract with Barcelona in the summer of 2019 that would keep her at the club until 2022. For her performances with Barcelona and Spain in the previous season, she won Catalan women's player of the year with 68% of the vote.

In 2020, she made her 100th appearance for Barcelona, coming on as a substitute against Tacón. Following a brief period of injury, she was substituted on in both matches of the Supercopa de España, including the final that Barcelona won 10–1 over Real Sociedad. Months later, following a decision from the RFEF to suspend the 2019–20 league season due to the COVID-19 pandemic, Barcelona were given the title, making it Bonmatí's first league title with the club as a senior player.

==== 2020–21 ====
In the middle of the 2020–21 season, Bonmatí played the final of the 2019–20 Copa de la Reina against Logroño, postponed a year later than normal due to COVID-19 concerns. She scored Barcelona's second goal of the final from a shot just inside the area, and earned the title of Copa de la Reina Final MVP for her performance.

In the semi-finals of that season's Champions League, Bonmatí provided an assist to Jenni Hermoso that brought Barcelona to a 1–1 draw in the first leg against Paris Saint-Germain. Barcelona won the second leg against PSG 2–1, where she started and was subbed out in the 79th minute for Asisat Oshoala. On 16 May 2021, she started her second Champions League final, this time against Chelsea. She scored off a ball from Alexia Putellas by dribbling past Jess Carter, giving Barcelona a 3–0 lead in the 21st minute. Barcelona finished the match as champions with a resounding 4–0 win, and Bonmatí's performance in the match earned her Champions League final MVP. Her goal was also voted 5th-best of the tournament, and she was included in the UWCL Squad of the Season for the first time. Later in the year, Bonmatí was listed as a nominee to the UEFA Women's Champions League Midfielder of the Season award.

Following the season, Bonmatí was in high demand and received transfer offers from teams in England, France, and Germany. In June 2021, Lyon reportedly offered to quadruple Bonmatí's salary along with paying Barcelona a €500,000 transfer fee – double the world record at the time – for her; though Barcelona was in a period of economic uncertainty, neither the club nor Bonmatí wanted her to move.

==== 2021–22 ====
On 29 September 2021, Bonmatí scored her first goal of the 2021–22 season as she scored the fourth goal in Barcelona's 8–0 league victory against Villarreal. On 17 October, she scored a brace against Sporting Huelva in a 5–0 win. She scored her first UWCL goal of the season as she scored against 1899 Hoffenheim in a 5–0 victory. On 31 December, Bonmatí renewed her contract with Barcelona until June 2025.

On 8 January 2022, she suffered an injury to her right leg in the 30th minute in a match against Granadilla Tenerife and was ruled out for around a month. On 23 January, Barcelona won the Supercopa de España while she was sidelined with injury. On 6 February, she marked her return from injury by scoring the final goal in a 7–0 thrashing of Eibar. On 30 March, she scored the second equalizing goal in a 5–2 (8–3 aggregate) win against Real Madrid in the 2nd leg of the UWCL quarter-final, which was played at Camp Nou in front of 91,553 spectators. A few weeks later, on 22 April, at the same ground in front of a record 91,648 spectators, she opened the scoring for Barcelona in the 3rd minute in a 5–1 victory against Wolfsburg in the UWCL semi-final 1st leg. On 8 May, she scored a hat-trick in a 6–1 win over Rayo Vallecano. A week later, she scored the second goal in a 2–1 win over Atlético Madrid in the final league match of the season, before being sent off in the final minutes of the game, as her team won the league with a perfect record. On 21 May, she started in the UWCL final as Barcelona lost 1–3 to Lyon. On 25 May, she scored the second goal in a 4–0 victory over Real Madrid in the Copa de la Reina. Four days later, she played in the Copa de la Reina final as Barcelona won 6–1 against Sporting Huelva to win the title.

==== 2022–23 ====
Ahead of the 2022–23 season, Putellas ruptured her ACL, leading to Bonmatí taking Putellas' position on the pitch for Barcelona. In the attacking midfield role, Bonmatí had what Nike summarised as "The best season. Of any footballer. Ever." She won every tournament that her teams could compete in, being named the player of the tournament in all of them with such an accolade, and was recognised with the UEFA Women's Player of the Year Award and the Ballon d'Or Féminin for the season. No player, male or female, had a more decorated season before.

==== 2023–24 ====
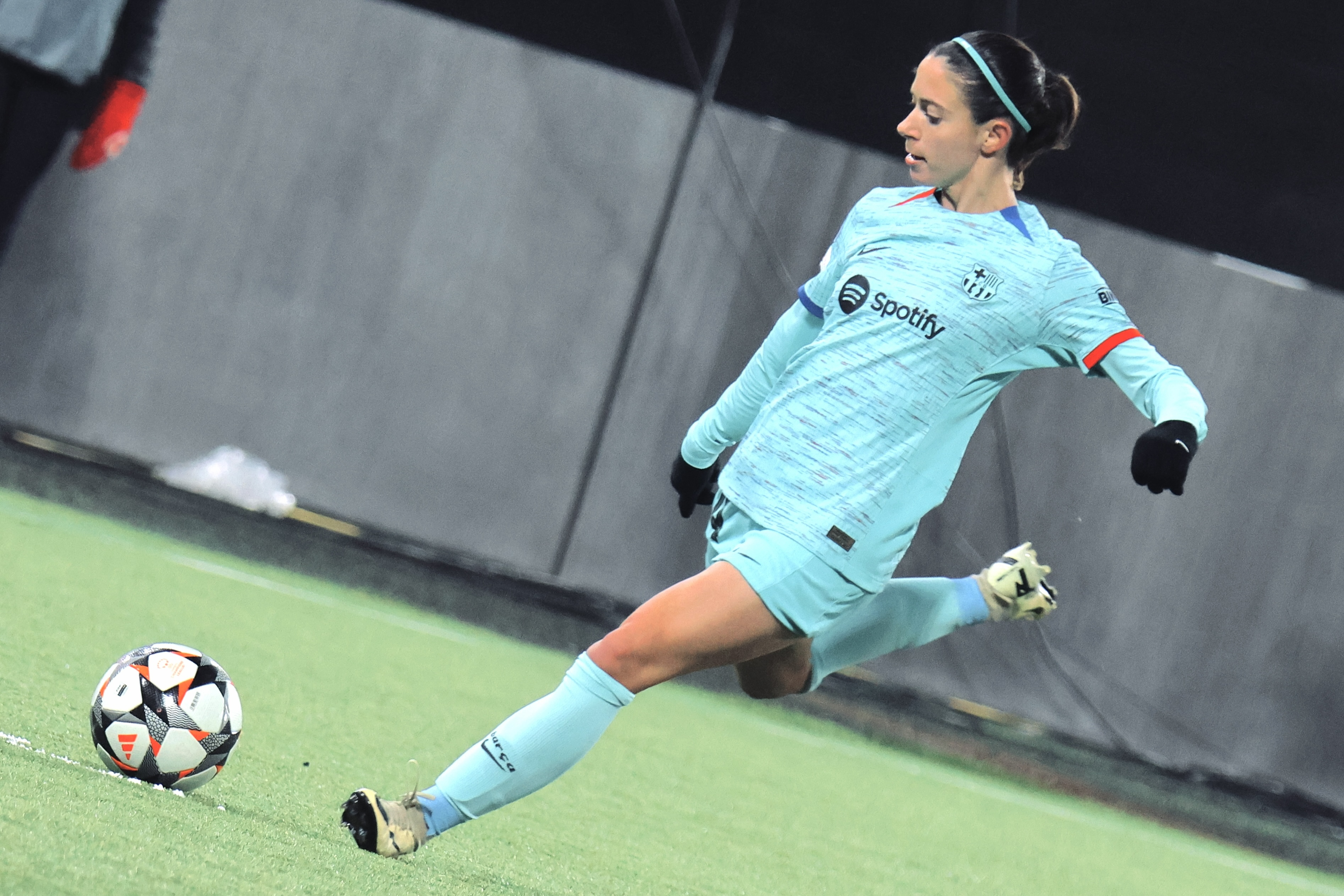
Bonmatí in March 2024

Bonmatí retained the attacking midfield role in the 2023–24 season, with captain Alexia Putellas returning but playing more as a striker to best utilise the strengths of the whole team.

On 4 May 2024, Bonmatí played the entire match as Barcelona won 4–1 against Granada to lift their fifth consecutive league title. On 18 May, Barcelona won 8–0 against Real Sociedad to win the Copa de la Reina. On 25 May, Bonmatí opened the scoring for Barcelona in a 2–0 victory over Lyon in the Champions League final to secure her and Barcelona's third (and second consecutive) Champions League title; in doing so, Barcelona achieved their second continental treble and first continental quadruple. Bonmatí was named MVP of the final and of the tournament as a whole, having six goals and six assists to also be top goal contributor. Excelling in other competitions, she was given a perfect 10 rating for the season by Sport, which suggested she was favourite to take more individual titles.

==== 2024–25 ====
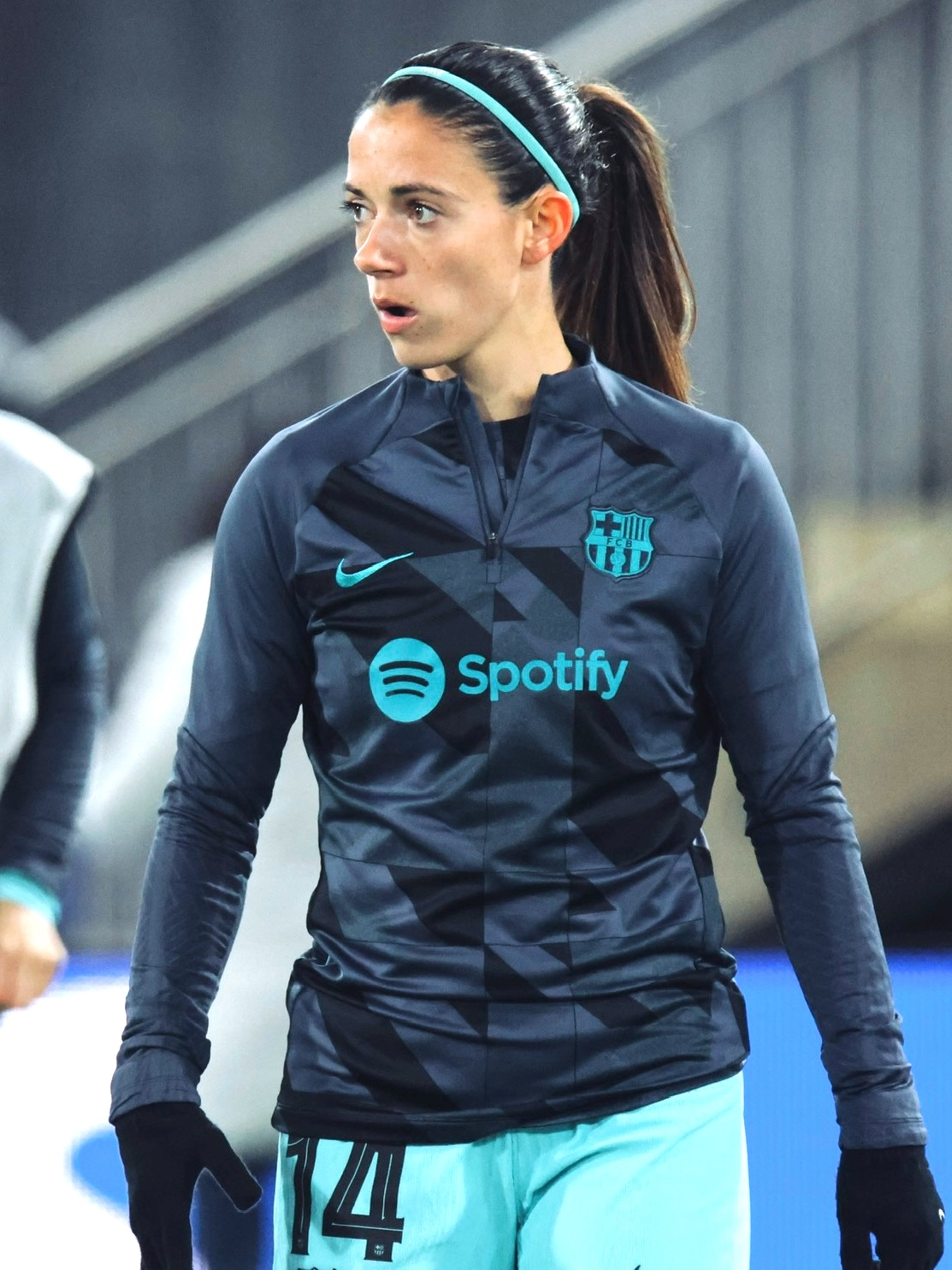
Bonmati in 2024

Bonmatí remained a central figure for Barcelona during the 2024–25 season, having signed a new contract in September 2024 until 2028, despite reported strong interest from other clubs. She played a decisive role in Barcelona's run to the 2025 UEFA Women's Champions League final, including their 8–2 aggregate victory over Chelsea in the semi-finals, and was subsequently named the 2024–25 Champions League Player of the Season after recording four goals and a competition-high five assists. In September that year, she won her third consecutive Ballon d'Or, becoming the first female player to achieve this feat.

==== 2025–26 ====
In December 2025, Bonmati was named The Best FIFA Women's Player of the year for 2025, for the third year running.

In September 2026, Aitana Bonmatí highlighted that there is a gap between Liga F and Europe's leading women's football leagues, particularly the English league, arguing that this inequality contributed to players leaving the Spanish league for other competitions.

== International career ==
=== Youth ===
Bonmatí has played at every junior level of the Spain women's national football team, including the U-17, U-19 and U-20 national teams.

At 15 years old, Bonmatí was called up as part of Spain's squad for the 2014 UEFA Women's U-17 Euro. She scored her first U-17 national team goals with a brace against Germany in a 4–0 group stage win, helping Spain finish first in Group B. From there, Spain advanced past the semi-finals after a 2–1 win against England. Bonmatí reached the final where she started the match, but ultimately finished runner-up in the tournament as Spain lost to Germany on penalties. She registered 398 total minutes in the tournament.

Months later, she participated in the 2014 FIFA U-17 Women's World Cup where she mostly had a substitute role. In the semi-final, Bonmatí was a halftime substitute against Italy, where Spain advanced after defeating them 2–0. Bonmatí was substituted on in the 53rd minute of the final, where Spain lost 0–2 to Japan.

Additionally, she was a member of the Spain U-17 squad that won the 2015 UEFA Women's U-17 Euro. In the group stage, she registered her first and only goal of the tournament in a 4–0 win against Germany. Spain finished first in Group A where they then faced France in the semi-final. She started and played through extra time where the match ended up going to penalties. She converted her penalty to end the shootout 4–3 and advance to the final against Switzerland. With a 5–2 win in the final, Bonmatí earned her first international title and was subsequently named to the Team of the Tournament for her standout performances throughout the competition.

Bonmatí was part of the Spain U-19 team that won the 2017 UEFA Women's Under-19 Euro. As part of a suspension, she was forced to sit out of the first three group stage matches after receiving a straight red card in a qualifying match versus Belgium. She made her first tournament appearance as captain in the semi-finals against Netherlands. Spain advanced to the final against France with a 3–2 win. Bonmatí started and captained the team to a victory against France, snapping Spain's run of three consecutive finals defeats at the U-19 Euro. With their finish, she earned her second international title as Spain were one of the three UEFA teams to qualify for the 2018 FIFA U-20 Women's World Cup.

Bonmatí was again named team captain at the 2018 FIFA U-20 Women's World Cup. In Group C, Spain registered two wins against Japan and Paraguay. They finished first in the group by holding the United States to a draw, knocking them out of the tournament in the group stage for the first time. Bonmatí was named the "Dare To Shine" player of the match. In the quarter-finals, she scored twice against Nigeria, but the second goal was not given despite TV replays showing it crossing the goal-line. Spain won that match 2–1 and reached the semi-final of the tournament against France. Bonmatí started the match but was sent off with a second yellow card after a challenge on France's Selma Bacha- the only red card in the entire tournament. Up until her ejection, she had played every minute of the tournament. Spain ended up winning the match, but Bonmatí was suspended for the final where Spain lost 1–3 to Japan.

She also has experience with the U-18 and U-16 Catalonia national football teams.

=== Senior ===
In November 2017, coach Jorge Vilda gave Bonmatí her first senior national team call–up for two 2019 FIFA Women's World Cup qualifying matches. She made her debut for Spain's senior national team against Austria, subbing on for Amanda Sampedro in the 53rd minute.

Bonmatí's first senior international tournament experience came in February 2018 when she was called up to participate in the 2018 Cyprus Cup. She made limited appearances throughout the tournament, but with Spain's win in the first-place match against Italy, she earned her first title with Spain's senior team.

In May 2019, Bonmatí was named to the Spain's 2019 FIFA Women's World Cup squad. She featured in two group stage matches – a win against South Africa and a loss against Germany. Spain finished second in Group A and reached the knockout rounds of a Women's World Cup for the first time in their history. They were defeated 1–2 in the Round of 16 by eventual tournament winners United States. Bonmatí finished the tournament with 58 minutes.

Later in that year, Bonmatí played in each of Spain's UEFA Women's Euro 2022 qualifying matches, ending the qualification phase with six goals.

Bonmatí was named in Spain's squad for the 2020 SheBelieves Cup that was held in March 2020. She played in two of the three matches as Spain finished second behind hosts United States.

On 25 November 2021, Bonmatí scored twice in a 12–0 win against Faroe Islands in a 2023 World Cup qualifying match. Five days later, she scored two more against Scotland.

She was among Las 15, a group of players who made themselves unavailable for international selection in September 2022 due to their dissatisfaction with the organisation of the team. She described the strike as difficult, due to losing money and sponsors and getting "killed in the press", but knew that things had to change. During the 2022–23 season, Bonmatí had meetings with the federation where she received acknowledgement of the grievances and promises for change, leading to her return to the squad ahead of the 2023 World Cup. She was one of three of the fifteen striking players who were recalled for the World Cup.

On 21 July 2023, in Spain's opening match of the World Cup, she scored their second goal in a 3–0 win over Costa Rica. On 5 August, Bonmatí scored twice and assisted twice in Spain's 5–1 rout over Switzerland to reach the quarter-finals. On 20 August, after Spain's 1–0 win over England in the final, Bonmatí was named the tournament's best player, receiving the Golden Ball during the end-of-tournament awards.

On 28 February, Bonmatí scored the opening goal in a 2–0 victory against France in the final of the 2023–24 UEFA Women's Nations League in Seville to clinch her and Spain's second international trophy.

Bonmati was selected for the Spanish team for the UEFA Women's Euro 2025. However, it was revealed two days before Spain were due to fly out to Switzerland that she had viral meningitis, casting doubt on whether she would be able to participate. She was discharged a few days later, before the start of the Euros, and was hoping to join the team in Switzerland ahead of the tournament.

In November 2025, she suffered a broken leg in training during the 2025 UEFA Women's Nations League Finals, sidelining her for an extended period and requiring surgery.

== Style of play ==
FCF has described Bonmatí as "pure elegance" and has noted her versatility as a player, able to adapt to different positions, play centrally, as a midfielder or as a winger. ESPN said that she is "technically gifted like few of her contemporaries."

After winning her first Catalan Player of the Year award, Jordi Ventura, the coach who signed her to Barcelona's Cadet team, emphasised that she is "an intense player, very competitive and perfectly dominates with both legs." In the same article, former FCB Femeni coach Xavi Llorens describes Bonmatí as having "innate elegance in driving the ball" and being "very competitive... versatile, can play in three, four or five positions and does not lower her level."

Ahead of the 2019 FIFA Women's World Cup, FIFA described her in her player profile as "technically gifted" with "superb vision with plenty of character" and "combative when required with an eye for goal."

Bonmatí sees her short stature as an advantage due to her low center of gravity that makes it hard for opponents to take her off the ball.

Pep Guardiola said, "Aitana Bonmatí is a football player who has me completely in love with her for the way she plays. I would say she is like the women's Iniesta."

Analysts also noted her influence beyond direct goal contributions, highlighting her creativity, ability to operate effectively under pressure, and consistent involvement in build-up play as defining aspects of her role in Barcelona's midfield.

== Career statistics ==
=== Club ===
As of match played 31 May 2026

Appearances and goals by club, season and competition
Club	Season	League			Copa de la Reina		UWCL		Supercopa		Total	
Club	Season	Division	Apps	Goals	Apps	Goals	Apps	Goals	Apps	Goals	Apps	Goals
Barcelona	2015–16	Primera División	0	0	3	0	0	0	–		3	0
Barcelona	2016–17	Primera División	12	2	1	1	2	0	–		15	3
Barcelona	2017–18	Primera División	15	0	3	0	2	1	–		20	1
Barcelona	2018–19	Primera División	27	12	3	0	7	1	–		37	13
Barcelona	2019–20	Primera División	20	5	4	2	5	2	2	0	31	9
Barcelona	2020–21	Primera División	31	10	2	0	9	3	1	0	43	13
Barcelona	2021–22	Primera División	25	13	4	1	10	4	0	0	39	18
Barcelona	2022–23	Primera División	23	10	1	2	11	5	2	2	37	19
Barcelona	2023–24	Primera División	24	8	4	4	11	6	2	1	41	19
Barcelona	2024–25	Primera División	26	12	5	0	11	4	2	0	44	15
Barcelona	2025–26	Primera División	15	7	1	0	6	0	0	0	22	7
Career total			218	79	31	10	74	26	9	3	332	117

=== International ===
As of match played 23 July 2025

Appearances and goals by national team and year
National team	Year	Apps	Goals
Spain	2017	1	0
Spain	2018	6	0
Spain	2019	12	4
Spain	2020	5	3
Spain	2021	11	7
Spain	2022	11	2
Spain	2023	14	5
Spain	2024	12	7
Spain	2025	11	3
Total		83	31

Scores and results list Spain's goal tally first, score column indicates score after each Bonmatí goal.

List of international goals scored by Aitana Bonmatí
No.	Date	Venue	Opponent	Score	Result	Competition
1	9 April 2019	Swindon, England	England	1–2	1–2	Friendly
2	4 October 2019	A Coruña, Spain	Azerbaijan	3–0	4–0	UEFA Women's Euro 2021 qualifying
3	4 October 2019	A Coruña, Spain	Azerbaijan	4–0	4–0	UEFA Women's Euro 2021 qualifying
4	8 October 2019	Prague, Czech Republic	Czech Republic	3–0	5–1	UEFA Women's Euro 2021 qualifying
5	23 October 2020	Seville, Spain	Czech Republic	3–0	4–0	UEFA Women's Euro 2021 qualifying
6	27 November 2020	Las Rozas de Madrid, Spain	Moldova	1–0	10–0	UEFA Women's Euro 2021 qualifying
7	27 November 2020	Las Rozas de Madrid, Spain	Moldova	5–0	10–0	UEFA Women's Euro 2021 qualifying
8	10 June 2021	Alcorcón, Spain	Belgium	3–0	3–0	Friendly
9	15 June 2021	Alcorcón, Spain	Denmark	1–0	3–0	Friendly
10	15 June 2021	Alcorcón, Spain	Denmark	3–0	3–0	Friendly
11	25 November 2021	Seville, Spain	Faroe Islands	2–0	12–0	2023 FIFA Women's World Cup qualification
12	25 November 2021	Seville, Spain	Faroe Islands	6–0	12–0	2023 FIFA Women's World Cup qualification
13	30 November 2021	Seville, Spain	Scotland	3–0	8–0	2023 FIFA Women's World Cup qualification
14	30 November 2021	Seville, Spain	Scotland	5–0	8–0	2023 FIFA Women's World Cup qualification
15	25 June 2022	Huelva, Spain	Australia	1–0	7–0	Friendly
16	8 July 2022	Milton Keynes, England	Finland	2–1	4–1	UEFA Women's Euro 2022
17	21 July 2023	Wellington, New Zealand	Costa Rica	2–0	3–0	2023 FIFA Women's World Cup
18	5 August 2023	Auckland, New Zealand	Switzerland	1–0	5–1	2023 FIFA Women's World Cup
19	5 August 2023	Auckland, New Zealand	Switzerland	3–1	5–1	2023 FIFA Women's World Cup
20	26 September 2023	Córdoba, Spain	Switzerland	2–0	5–0	2023–24 UEFA Women's Nations League
21	26 September 2023	Córdoba, Spain	Switzerland	3–0	5–0	2023–24 UEFA Women's Nations League
22	23 February 2024	Seville, Spain	Netherlands	2–0	3–0	2024 UEFA Women's Nations League Finals
23	28 February 2024	Seville, Spain	France	1–0	2–0	2024 UEFA Women's Nations League Finals
24	12 July 2024	Chomutov, Czech Republic	Czech Republic	1–0	1–2	UEFA Women's Euro 2025 qualifying
25	16 July 2024	A Coruña, Spain	Belgium	1–0	2–0	UEFA Women's Euro 2025 qualifying
26	25 July 2024	Nantes, France	Japan	1–1	2–1	2024 Summer Olympics
27	29 November 2024	Cartagena, Spain	South Korea	3–0	5–0	Friendly
28	3 December 2024	Nice, France	France	1–0	4–2	Friendly
29	8 April 2025	Vigo, Spain	Portugal	2–0	7–1	2025 UEFA Women's Nations League
30	8 April 2025	Vigo, Spain	Portugal	3–0	7–1	2025 UEFA Women's Nations League
31	23 July 2025	Zurich, Switzerland	Germany	1–0	1–0 (a.e.t.)	UEFA Women's Euro 2025
32	9 June 2026	Reykjavík, Iceland	Iceland	6–1	6–1	2027 FIFA World Cup qualification

== Honours ==
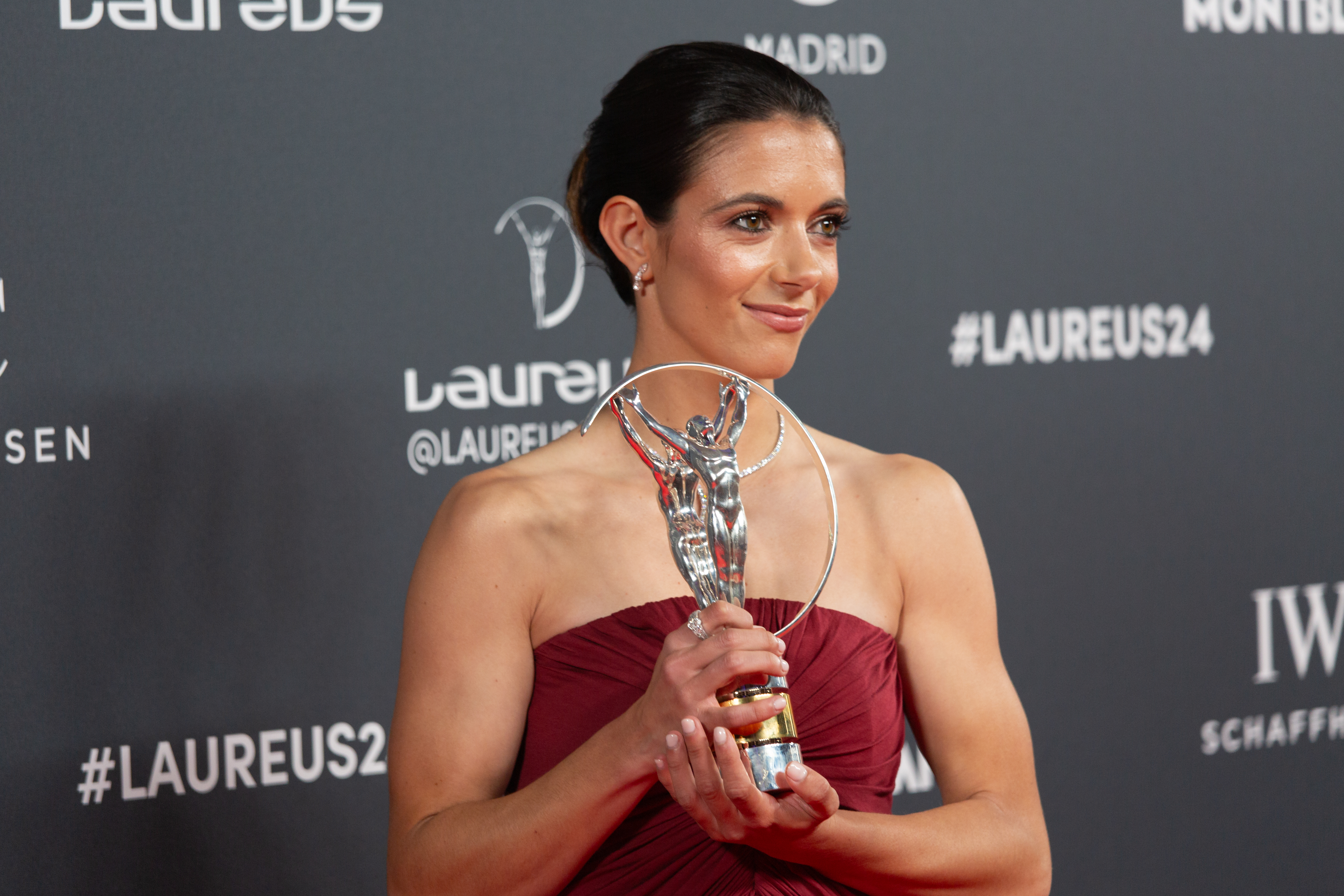
Bonmatí with her 2024 Laureus World Sports Award

Barcelona B

- Segunda División: 2015–16 (Group-III)

Barcelona

- Primera División: 2019–20, 2020–21, 2021–22, 2022–23, 2023–24, 2024–25, 2025–26
- Copa de la Reina: 2017, 2018, 2019–20, 2020–21, 2021–22, 2023–24, 2024–25, 2025–26
- Supercopa de España: 2019–20, 2021–22, 2022–23, 2023–24, 2024–25
- Copa Catalunya: 2016, 2017, 2018, 2019
- UEFA Women's Champions League: 2020–21, 2022–23, 2023–24, 2025–26

Spain U17

- UEFA Women's Under-17 Championship: 2015; runner-up 2014
- FIFA U-17 Women's World Cup: runner-up 2014

Spain U19

- UEFA Women's Under-19 Championship: 2017; runner-up 2016

Spain U20

- FIFA U-20 Women's World Cup: runner-up 2018

Spain

- FIFA Women's World Cup: 2023
- UEFA Women's Championship runner-up: 2025
- UEFA Women's Nations League: 2023–24

Individual

- The Best FIFA Women's Player: 2023, 2024, 2025
- Ballon d'Or Féminin: 2023, 2024, 2025
- Globe Soccer Awards Women's Player of the Year: 2024, 2025
- Laureus World Sportswoman of the Year: 2024
- Golden Player Woman Award: 2023, 2024
- FIFA Women's World Cup Golden Ball: 2023
- UEFA Women's Player of the Year: 2022–23
- UEFA Women's Champions League Player of the Season: 2022–23, 2023–24, 2024–25
- UEFA Women's Championship Player of the Tournament: 2025
- UEFA Women's Championship Team of the Tournament: 2022, 2025
- IFFHS Women's Player of the Year: 2023, 2024, 2025
- IFFHS Women's Playmaker of the Year: 2023, 2024, 2025
- UEFA Women's Under-17 Championship Team of the Tournament: 2015
- Copa de la Reina Final MVP: 2019–20
- Supercopa de España Femenina Final MVP: 2022–23
- Catalan Player of the Year: 2019
- UEFA Women's Champions League Final MVP: 2021, 2024
- UEFA Women's Champions League Squad of the Season: 2020–21, 2022–23, 2023–24, 2024–25
- Memorial Aldo Rovira Award: 2022–23, 2023–24
- Premi Barça Jugadors (Barça Players Award): 2020–21, 2021–22, 2022–23, 2023–24
- IFFHS Women's World Team: 2021, 2022, 2023, 2024
- World Soccer Women's World Player of the Year: 2023, 2024
- Globe Soccer Best Women's Player of the Year: 2023
- FIFA FIFPRO Women's World 11: 2023, 2024, 2025
- IFFHS Women's UEFA Team: 2021, 2022, 2023, 2024
- UEFA Women's Nations League Player of the Finals: 2024
- The Best FIFA Women's 11: 2024, 2025

In November 2023, Bonmati was named to the BBC's 100 Women list.
