= Sheila Elorza =

Spanish footballer (born 1996)

Personal information
- Full name: Sheila Elorza Hernández
- Date of birth: 8 June 1996 (age 30)
- Place of birth: Zaratamo, Spain
- Height: 1.49 m (4 ft 11 in)
- Position: Midfielder

Team information
- Current team: Real Oviedo
- Number: 21

Youth career
- 2008–2011: Ugao

Senior career*
Years	Team	Apps	(Gls)
2011–2015	Athletic B	85	(24)
2015	Athletic Bilbao	2	(0)
2015–2017	EdF Logroño		
2017–2018	San Ignacio		
2018–2023	Eibar	95+	(2+)
2023–2024	Alavés Gloriosas	26	(1)
2024–	Real Oviedo	8	(1)
- * Club domestic league appearances and goals as of 29 October 2024

Sheila Elorza Hernández (born 8 June 1996) is a Spanish footballer who plays for Real Oviedo as a midfielder.

She began her senior career at Athletic Bilbao but played mainly for their B team, with only two Primera División appearances shortly before leaving the club in 2015. She then spent two seasons with EDF Logroño and one with San Ignacio prior to joining Eibar in 2018; she was appointed captain, and played an important role in the squad which gained promotion to the top tier in the 2019–20 season, at which point she agreed to extend her contract until 2022.

Eibar survived their first season in the Primera División, then experienced a relegation followed by another promotion. Elorza left the club on 31 August 2023 and signed for Alavés a day later. In July 2024, she moved to Real Oviedo, recently relegated to the third tier.

Elorza never played for Spain at any level, but was selected for the non-FIFA Basque Country squad in 2021 (two 45-minute matches were played and it is not clear if they are considered full caps).
