= Miguel Ángel Ortiz Arias =

Spanish football referee (born 1984)

Miguel Ángel Ortiz Arias (born 23 November 1984) is a Spanish football referee. He has refereed in La Liga since 2021–22, and won the Guruceta Trophy for best referee in his first season.

== Career ==
Born in Madrid, Ortiz Arias is a physical education teacher. His father was a referee and told him to try it, as he was arguing with referees while a player. He refereed in the Segunda División B for a decade from 2009, two seasons in the Segunda División, and was promoted to La Liga for 2021–22. His debut on 14 August was a goalless draw between CA Osasuna and RCD Espanyol. After 17 games in his debut season, he was given the Guruceta Trophy for best referee by the newspaper Marca.

In June 2024, Ortiz Arias told Diario AS that he considered football a game about contesting the ball physically and would let the game flow, but he had a zero tolerance for dissent.

At the start of 2026, Ortiz Arias refereed a game between Rayo Vallecano and Getafe CF, two teams from the Community of Madrid. Despite being a native of the region and a member of its refereeing committee, he was permitted to officiate the game due to rule changes that allowed a referee from the same region if both teams were based there. On the same basis, he was chosen for the Madrid derby between Atlético Madrid and Real Madrid on 20 September.
