= Valentín Pizarro Gómez =

Spanish football referee (born 1981)

Valentín Pizarro Gómez (born 14 August 1981) is a Spanish football official. He was a referee in La Liga from 2019 to 2023, and won the Guruceta Trophy for best referee in his first and last season. He then became a video assistant referee.

== Career ==
Pizarro Gómez was born in Ciudad Real. He graduated in English and taught physical education, as well as refereeing from the age of 14. A member of the refereeing committee of the Community of Madrid, he refereed in Segunda División B from 2007 to 2014, followed by five years in the Segunda División. He was promoted to La Liga for the 2019–20 season; his debut on 25 August was a 1–0 win for Real Sociedad away to RCD Mallorca and he was praised by former referee José María Enríquez Negreira in Mundo Deportivo for his interactions with the players. He finished his first season with 18 matches and won the Guruceta Trophy for best referee.

In 2022–23, Pizarro Gómez won his second Guruceta Trophy, having refereed 16 games. Aged 41, he left refereeing after four La Liga seasons, and became a video assistant referee.

== Personal life ==
As of 2026, Pizarro Gómez lived in Rivas-Vaciamadrid. His cousin Emilio Pérez Pizarro refereed in Spanish basketball's Liga ACB for over 25 years.
