= Jone Ibáñez =

Spanish footballer (born 1997)

Personal information
- Full name: Jone Ibáñez Mazo
- Date of birth: 22 July 1997 (age 29)
- Place of birth: Galdakao, Spain
- Height: 1.63 m (5 ft 4 in)
- Position: Midfielder

Youth career
- 2005–2011: Lanbide

Senior career*
| Years | Team | Apps | (Gls) |
| 2011–2012 | Galdakao | | |
| 2012–2017 | Athletic B | 93 | (31) |
| 2015–2021 | Athletic Club | 73 | (2) |
| 2021–2022 | Deportivo Abanca | 26 | (3) |
| 2022–2023 | Eibar | 28 | (2) |

International career
| 2022 | Basque Country | 1 | (0) |
- * Club domestic league appearances and goals as of 21:13, 16 December 2023 (UTC)

Jone Ibáñez Mazo (born 22 July 1997) is a Spanish footballer who plays as a midfielder. She most recently played for Eibar.

== Early life and education ==
Ibáñez is a native of Galdakao (Biscay, Basque Country) in Spain. She studied sports science at the University of Deusto.

== Career ==
Ibáñez joined the youth academy of Athletic Club at the age of 15. She had a small role as the club won the Primera División championship in 2016, however, later in that year she sustained a dislocation of her kneecap which kept her out of action for almost a year, and then had the same injury in 2019, this time undergoing surgery to prevent a recurrence. She renewed her contract with Athletic in 2020, but left in 2021.

She later played for Deportivo Abanca and for Eibar (signing for both clubs together with her friend and teammate at Athletic, Andrea Sierra), helping Eibar to achieve promotion from the second tier in 2023. She departed from the Gipuzkoan club in acrimonious circumstances after it was made clear that the coach did not intend to use her and ostracised her from the group, resulting in the parties terminating the contract.

== Style of play ==
Ibáñez mainly operates as a midfielder and has been described as a "solid midfielder in marking, hard-working and with a great competitive character".
