= Mariana Cerro =

Spanish footballer (born 2000)

Personal information
- Full name: Mariana Cerro Galán
- Date of birth: 22 May 2000 (age 26)
- Place of birth: Zizur Mayor, Spain
- Position: Midfielder

Team information
- Current team: Athletic Club
- Number: 26

Youth career
- 2009–2016: Ardoi

Senior career*
Years	Team	Apps	(Gls)
2016–2017	Mulier		
2017–2018	Osasuna		
2018–2022	Athletic Club B	84	(18)
2021–	Athletic Club	78	(3)
2025	→ Eibar (loan)	16	(2)
- * Club domestic league appearances and goals as of 25 July 2025

Mariana Cerro Galán (born 22 May 2000) is a Spanish footballer who plays as a midfielder for Athletic Club.

== Career ==
Cerro started her career at Ardoi. On 4 April 2021, she made her Primera División debut for Athletic Club, coming on as a substitute for Yulema Corres against Santa Teresa. Cerro became the first Athletic Club B player to debut for the first team under Iraia Iturregi's management and was praised for her performance.

Having rarely featured in the first half of the 2024–25 Liga F campaign, in January 2025 she was loaned to Eibar until the end of the season.
