= Carlos Megía Dávila =

Spanish football referee (born 1966)

- Born: 7 July 1966 (age 60); Madrid, Spain

Domestic
| Years | League | Role |
| 1992–1994 | Segunda División B | Referee |
| 1994–1995 | Segunda División | Referee |
| 1995–2009 | La Liga | Referee |

Carlos Megía Dávila (born 7 July 1966) is a Spanish former football referee. He officiated in La Liga from 1995 to 2009, and won the Guruceta Trophy for best referee in his two final seasons. After leaving refereeing due to physical problems, he became an employee of Real Madrid.

== Career ==
Megía González was born in Madrid. He began refereeing in Segunda División B in 1992–93 and was promoted to the Segunda División in 1994. On 10 September 1995, he officiated in his first La Liga match, between Valencia and Real Valladolid.

On 25 August, Megía Dávila was the referee in the second leg of the 2004 Supercopa de España, as Real Zaragoza won away to Valencia. For the 2007–08 La Liga season, he won the Guruceta Trophy for best referee, and retained it the following season. Over 14 years, he officiated in 219 La Liga games, as well as UEFA Cup games and UEFA Champions League qualifiers. He refereed in international qualifiers for the 2006 FIFA World Cup and UEFA Euro 2008, both in home wins for Italy.

Megía Dávila was the only candidate to fail the physical tests before the 2009–10 La Liga season, as he had been affected by lumbalgia since the previous campaign. In September 2009, he was hired by Real Madrid as refereeing delegate; both Villarreal and Real Valladolid also had ex-professional referees in the role. In October 2017, he became the pitch delegate, replacing Agustín Herrerín, a club employee of half a century.

== Personal life ==
Megía Dávila's father and brother José Luis were both referees, and the latter died from an illness while his career was developing. His wife Yolanda Parga is a former assistant referee who was appointed head of women's refereeing by the Royal Spanish Football Federation.
