= Manuel Mejuto González =

Spanish football referee

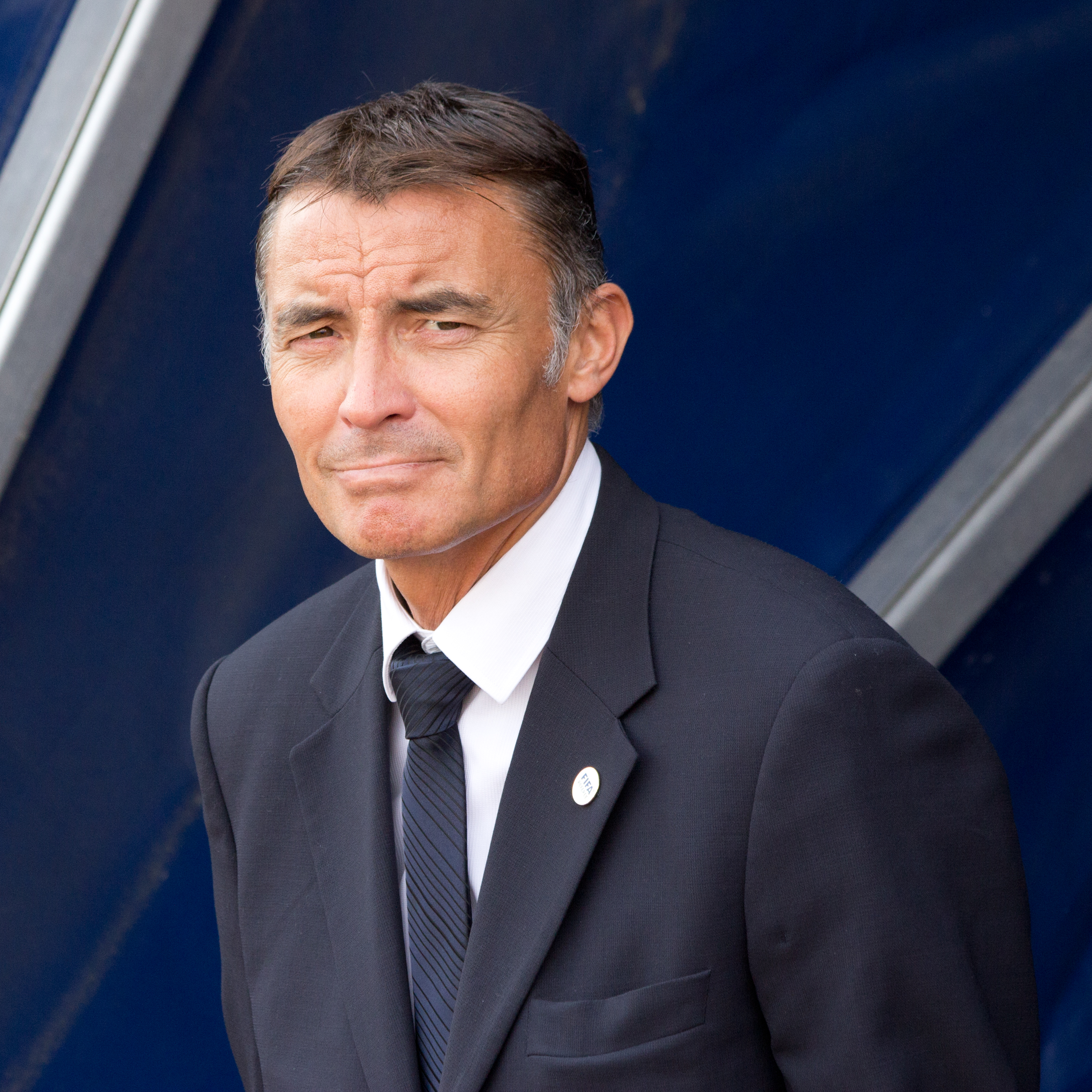
- Full name: Manuel Enrique Mejuto González
- Born: 16 April 1965 (age 61); La Felguera, Spain
- Other occupation: Civil servant

Domestic
Years	League	Role
1987–1990	Tercera	Referee
1990–1994	Segunda B	Referee
1994–1995	Segunda	Referee
1995–2010	La Liga	Referee

International
Years	League	Role
1999–2010	FIFA listed	Referee

Manuel Enrique Mejuto González (born 16 April 1965) is a Spanish former football referee. He is best known for refereeing the 2005 UEFA Champions League final between Liverpool and Milan. He also officiated two matches in the Euro 2004 in Portugal. In European club competition, he has refereed three UEFA Cup matches and thirty-seven UEFA Champions League matches in his career.

== Career ==
Mejuto was born in La Felguera, Langreo. He oversaw the final of the 2001 FIFA World Youth Championship between Argentina and Ghana in Buenos Aires.

On 16 October 2005, he referred the Russian Premier League match between Spartak Moscow and Zenit St.Petersburg.

At the Euro 2008 finals, Mejuto dismissed the managers of both teams, Joachim Löw and Josef Hickersberger, from the touchline and into the stands at the end of the first half of the Group B match between Austria and Germany on 16 June 2008, "for what appeared to be an ongoing spat with the fourth official", according to the BBC.

Mejuto refereed in a 2010 World Cup qualification match between Sweden and Denmark on 10 October 2009.

== Honours ==
- Guruceta Trophy: 2001–02, 2002–03, 2003–04
- Silbato de Oro: 1993–94 (Segunda División B), 2003–04 (La Liga)
- Don Balón Award (Best Spanish Referee): 1996–97, 1998–99, 2002–03, 2005–06, 2007–08
