= Andrea Sierra =

Spanish footballer

Personal information
- Full name: Andrea Maddalen Sierra Larrauri
- Date of birth: 15 May 1998 (age 28)
- Place of birth: Bilbao, Spain
- Height: 1.69 m (5 ft 7 in)
- Position: Defender

Team information
- Current team: Yverdon Sport FC
- Number: 2

Youth career
- Loiola Indautxu
- 2012–2014: Bizkerre

Senior career*
Years	Team	Apps	(Gls)
2014–2016	Athletic Club B	55	(5)
2016–2021	Athletic Club	57	(1)
2021–2022	Deportivo	16	(0)
2022–2025	Eibar	66	(2)
2025–	Yverdon Sport FC	16	(1)

International career^{‡}
2015	Spain U17	2	(1)
2016–2017	Spain U19	14	(3)
2016–2018	Spain U20	5	(0)
Medal record
Women's football
Representing Spain
UEFA Women's Under-17 Championship
Winner	2015 Iceland
UEFA Women's Under-19 Championship
Winner	2017 Northern Ireland
Runner-up	2016 Slovakia
FIFA U-20 Women's World Cup
Runner-up	2018 France
- * Club domestic league appearances and goals as of 25 July 2025 ‡ National team caps and goals as of 27 October 2024

Andrea Maddalen Sierra Larrauri (born 15 May 1998) is a Spanish footballer who plays as a defender for Yverdon Sport FC. She began her career at Athletic Club and also played for Deportivo and Eibar, before moving to Yverdon in 2025.

== Club career ==
Sierra started her career in the youth teams of Loiola and Bizkerre in her hometown of Bilbao. She joined Athletic Club in 2014, initially playing for their B-team; aged 18, her Primera División (later Liga F) debut came on 30 October 2016 against Atlético Madrid, followed by promotion to the senior squad from then on. She scored her first goal for the team against Levante on 12 January 2020, rescuing a draw for her side in stoppage time and coincidentally on a day when she had been selected as the 'cover star' on the club's matchday programme for the fixture. Partly due to injuries, she was never a regular starter for Athletic across a full season, her best return being 21 appearances (two in the Copa de la Reina) in 2018–19 as the team finished 5th.

In 2021, her Athletic contract expired and she joined second-tier Deportivo Abanca together with her friend and teammate at Athletic, Jone Ibáñez, and helped the Galician team keep their place as restructuring reduced the division from two groups to one.

In 2022, both Sierra and Ibáñez signed for Eibar, competing at the same level after being relegated, and the team achieved promotion back to the top tier with a 2nd-place finish in the 2022–23 Primera Federación. Sierra made 26 appearances in the 2023–24 Liga F campaign as Eibar comfortably maintained their divisional status but, having renewed her contract for a further year, was absent at the start of the following season due to injury.

== International career ==
Sierra represented Spain at various youth levels, being a member of squads which won the 2015 UEFA Women's Under-17 Championship in Iceland and the 2017 UEFA Women's Under-19 Championship in Northern Ireland, and were beaten finalists in the 2016 UEFA Women's Under-19 Championship in Slovakia and the 2018 FIFA U-20 Women's World Cup in France.
