= Javier Alberola Rojas =

Spanish football referee

Alberola Rojas
- Born: Javier Alberola Rojas; June 22, 1991 (age 35); Ciudad Real, Castile-La Mancha, Spain
- Occupation: Referee
- Years active: 2017–current
- Height: 1.90 m (6 ft 3 in)

Javier Alberola Rojas (born 22 June 1991) is a Spanish football referee who officiates in the top Spanish league, La Liga. He became a FIFA referee on 1 January 2024 and officiates international games organised by the UEFA.

== Refereeing career ==
In his first season in the Segunda División, he refereed the promotion play-off game between Girona FC and Córdoba CF (3–1). After two seasons in Segunda División, he earned his promotion to La Liga. He became the second youngest referee to be promoted to the First Division, after Brito Arceo.

He made his La Liga debut on 26 August 2017 in a match between Levante UD and Deportivo de La Coruña (2–2).

At the end of the 2020–21 season, he was awarded the Guruceta Trophy by the newspaper Marca, as the best referee in La Liga.

On 8 November 2026, he had a highly balanced refereeing performance in La Liga game between Atlético de Madrid and FC Barcelona, held at the Riyadh Air Metropolitano in Madrid.

== Personal life ==
He obtained a university degree in early childhood education from Toledo University, and later on, a Master's degree in sports psychology from Isabel I University.
