= Naia Landaluze =

Spanish footballer

Personal information
- Full name: Naia Landaluze Marquínez
- Date of birth: 25 September 2000 (age 26)
- Place of birth: Orozko, Spain
- Position: Defender

Team information
- Current team: Athletic Club
- Number: 3

College career
Years	Team	Apps	(Gls)
2019	Campbellsville Tigers	20	(3)

Senior career*
Years	Team	Apps	(Gls)
2014–2015	Laudio		
2015	Altzarrate		
2016	Lakua		
2016–2019	Pauldarrak		
2020–2022	Athletic Club B	52	(10)
2021–	Athletic Club	71	(3)
- * Club domestic league appearances and goals as of 25 July 2025

Naia Landaluze Marquínez (born 25 September 2000) is a Spanish footballer who plays as a defender for Athletic Club.

== Club career ==
Landaluze began her career at local teams Laudio, Altzarrate and Lakua (playing at senior level from the age of 14) then spent three seasons with one of the Basque region's stronger amateur clubs, Pauldarrak. In 2019, aged 18, she moved to the United States to study at the Campbellsville University, as part of her degree in Data Science and Artificial Intelligence at the University of Deusto. There she played for the Campbellsville Tigers and received an 'All-America Honorable Mention' from the NAIA. However, due to the impact of the COVID-19 pandemic she returned home, and in the summer of 2020 was offered a contract by Athletic Club so opted not to go back to America (but would continue her studies in Deusto).

Initially assigned to Athletic's C-team, she quickly impressed the coaches with her determination and was instead placed in the B-squad, where she would make more than 50 appearances in the second tier over the next two seasons. She made her debut for the senior team in the Primera División (now Liga F) on 22 June 2021 in a 4–0 defeat to Barcelona, but during the following campaign was only an unused substitute in a handful of fixtures.

With the retiral of veteran Vanesa Gimbert, Landaluze was promoted to the main squad ahead of the 2022–23 season and began to feature more regularly (her debut as a starter coming against Real Madrid on 28 January 2023), a factor being long-term injuries to established defenders Naroa Uriarte and Garazi Murua and the departure of Ainhoa Moraza, with Landaluze often filling in on the right if Oihane Hernández was unavailable, rather than in her preferred role in the centre.

Her progress continued in 2023–24 with 28 appearance (17 starts) and two goals in the league despite the emergence of right-back Ane Elexpuru to replace Hernández and the signing of Maddi Torre, as Oihane Valdezate's move to Roma freed up a place to be fought over between two of Torre, Bibiane Schulze and Landaluze, who in June 2024 signed a new contract running to 2026.

At the start of 2024–25, a serious injury to Schulze meant that Torre and Landaluze were the regular defensive partnership for Athletic.
