= Alvine Njolle =

Cameroonian footballer

Personal information
- Full name: Alvine Emma Njolle Ngonja
- Date of birth: 9 May 1994 (age 32)
- Place of birth: Cameroon,
- Height: 1.60 m (5 ft 3 in)
- Position: Defender

Team information
- Current team: Caïman Douala

Senior career*
Years	Team	Apps	(Gls)
2016–2020	Minsk	87	(24)
?	Caïman Douala		

International career^{‡}
2019–	Cameroon	1	(0)
- * Club domestic league appearances and goals as of 4 July 2020 ‡ National team caps and goals as of 12 November 2019

Alvine Emma Njolle Ngonja (born 9 May 1994) is a Cameroonian footballer who plays as a defender for Belarusian club FC Minsk and the Cameroon women's national team.

== International career ==
Njolle played for Cameroon at senior level in the 2020 CAF Women's Olympic Qualifying Tournament (fourth round).
