= Athletic Club (women) B =

Spanish football club

Athletic Femenino B
- Full name: Athletic Club Femenino B
- Founded: 2002; 24 years ago
- Ground: Lezama (Field 8), Biscay, Spain
- President: Jon Uriarte
- Coach: Ander Ojanguren
- League: Primera Federación
- 2025–26: Segunda Federación, Group I (1st - promoted)
- Website: Official
Home colours	Away colours

Athletic Club Femenino B is a Spanish women's association football team based in Bilbao, in the autonomous community of the Basque Country, Spain.

Founded in 2002, it is the reserve team of Athletic Club Femenino, and currently plays in the Primera Federación, playing their home matches at the Lezama Facilities.

Reserve teams in Spain play in the same league system as the senior team, rather than in a reserve team league. They must play at least one level below their main side, and thus Athletic B are ineligible for promotion to the Primera División and cannot play in the Copa de la Reina.

== History ==
In 2002, Athletic Bilbao introduced a women's section to their football activities, absorbing a local club Leioa EFT. At the same time they introduced a women's reserve team (which had been established by Leioa the previous year) with the aim of developing players for the senior side.

After a single season in the Basque provincial league, the B-team was promoted to the second tier – then known as the Primera Nacional – where they remained for two decades, winning their regional group in the competition four times (most recently in 2017) but being ineligible for promotion.

Athletic B, whose players are usually between 16 and 21 years of age, are also regular participants in the Copa Vasca, a regional tournament for lower-league teams, and have won the trophy six times.

Below the reserve level Athletic have a C-team, introduced in 2019 and quickly promoted to the Basque provincial league, and a girls' cadet (under-15) team, introduced in 2017 and competing at local youth level. In common with all other teams fielded by the club, only players who meet their recruitment policy of having a connection to the 'greater Basque Country' are eligible to join.

With the second tier re-organised in the early 2020s into two groups, then into just one, with a resultant uplift in the average standards (combined with general progress in the women's game in that period due to increasing investment and professionalisation), the teenagers of Athletic B began to find it difficult to remain competitive and it was no great surprise when they were finally relegated from the Primera Federación in 2023–24; this would have caused Athletic C to have been demoted, but they were also among the bottom places in their Segunda Federación group and would have dropped down in any event.

== Players ==
=== Current squad ===
As of 5 July 2026

Note: Flags indicate national team as defined under FIFA eligibility rules; some limited exceptions apply. Players may hold more than one non-FIFA nationality.

No.	Pos.	Nation	Player
1	GK	ESP	Elene Aldekoa
2	DF	ESP	Irati Alfaro (captain)
3	DF	ESP	Garazi Maroto
4	DF	ESP	Laida Balerdi
5	DF	ESP	Nerea Benito
6	MF	ESP	Ane Baigorri
7	FW	ESP	Irati Martín
10	FW	ESP	Ainhize Redondo
12	DF	ESP	Garazi Alonso
13	GK	ESP	Ziara Vega

No.	Pos.	Nation	Player
14	FW	GEQ	Thais Pargaray
15	DF	ESP	Irune Zurdo
16	MF	ESP	Maya Sáez
17	MF	ESP	Daniela Hormaechea
18	FW	ESP	Oihana Aginaga
21	FW	ESP	Oihana Agirregomezkorta
22	MF	ESP	Izaro Torrontegi
23	MF	ESP	Elene Gurtubay
25	FW	ESP	Carla Fernández
—	DF	ESP	Nerea Bengoa

=== Reserve team ===
Note: Flags indicate national team as defined under FIFA eligibility rules; some limited exceptions apply. Players may hold more than one non-FIFA nationality.

No.	Pos.	Nation	Player
26	DF	ESP	Ane Bordagaray
29	FW	ESP	Iraia Fernández

No.	Pos.	Nation	Player
31	GK	ESP	Argia García
32	GK	ESP	Goiatz Ferráz

== Season to season ==
=== As Leioa EFT B ===
Season	Division	Place	Copa Vasca
2001–02	Provincial	5th	
2002–03	Provincial	3rd	

=== As Athletic Club B ===
Season	Division	Place	Copa Vasca
2003–04	Primera Nac.	7th (Note: Placing in one of 6 regionalised groups.)	Winners
2004–05	Primera Nac.	7th	Winners
2005–06	Primera Nac.	3rd	Group stage
2006–07	Primera Nac.	3rd	2nd round
2007-08	Primera Nac.	2nd	Group stage
2008-09	Primera Nac.	2nd	Runners-up
2009–10	Primera Nac.	1st	Group stage
2010–11	Primera Nac.	2nd	Winners
2011–12	2ª	1st (Note: Placing in one of 7 regionalised groups.)	Runners-up
2012–13	2ª	5th	Quarter-final
2013–14	2ª	1st	Semi-final
2014–15	2ª	2nd	Winners
2015–16	2ª	3rd	Quarter-final
2016–17	2ª	1st	Runners-up
2017–18	2ª	2nd	Winners
2018–19	2ª	4th (Note: The team qualified to move up to the new Segunda División Pro but remained in the second tier of the system due to its creation.)	Winners
2019–20	2ª Pro	1st (Note: Placing in one of 2 regionalised groups.) (Note: Season curtailed due to the COVID-19 pandemic in Spain.)	
2020–21	2ª Pro	7th (Note: In 1 of 4 regionalised Autumn subgroups.)/3rd (Note: in 1 of 2 regionalised 'retention/relegation' Spring subgroups.)	
2021–22	2ª Pro	10th	
2022–23	1ª Fed	11th	
2023–24	1ª Fed	13th	
2024–25 (es)	2ª Fed	3rd	
2025–26 (es)	2ª Fed	1st (Note: Placing in one of 3 regionalised groups.)	

== Notable graduates ==
Note: this list contains players who have appeared in at least 50 games for the first team or another top-level club. Current players in bold.

Name	Senior Debut	Ref
**Daniela Agote**	2024	
Arene Altonaga	2009	
Ainhoa Álvarez	2014	
**Jone Amezaga**	2022	
Paula Arana	2021	
Joana Arranz	2011	
**Ane Azkona**	2016	
Naiara Beristain	2009	
Damaris Egurrola	2015	
**Ane Elexpuru**	2022	
Sheila Elorza	2015	
Joana Flaviano	2007	
Alazne Gómez	2012	
Oihane Hernández	2019	
Jone Ibáñez	2015	
**Naia Landaluze**	2021	

Name	Senior Debut	Ref
Eztizen Merino	2012	
Garazi Murua	2010	
Irune Murua	2003	
Nerea Nevado	2018	
**Irene Oguiza**	2020	
Maite Oroz	2015	
**Sara Ortega**	2022	
Arrate Orueta	2003	
Marta Perea	2015	
**Clara Pinedo**	2021	
Amaiur Sarriegi	2019	
Andrea Sierra	2016	
**Maddi Torre**	2015	
Oihane Valdezate	2019	
Leia Zarate	2016	
Maite Zubieta	2022	
