= Xavi Llorens =

Spanish football manager (born 1958)

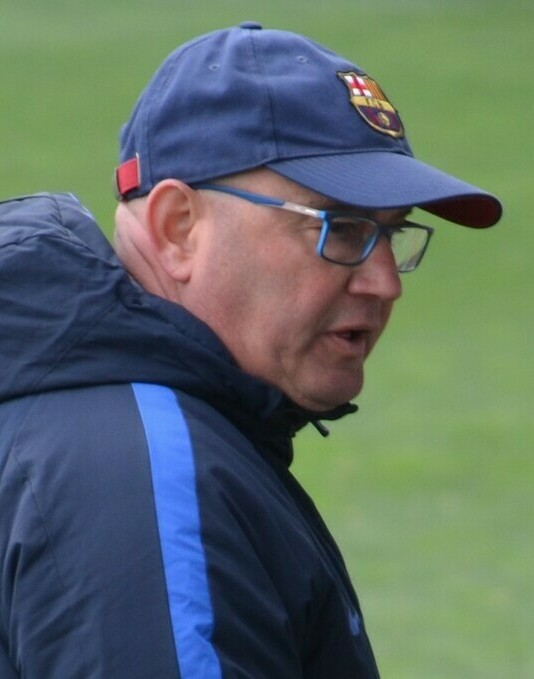

Personal information
- Full name: Xavi Llorens Rodríguez
- Date of birth: 5 June 1958 (age 68)
- Place of birth: Barcelona, Spain
- Height: 1.70 m (5 ft 7 in)

Xavi Llorens Rodríguez (born 5 June 1958) is a Spanish football manager. He last was manager of FC Barcelona Femení. He joined the team in June 2006 and stepped down after the 2016–17 season, having spent eleven seasons at the club. Llorens is currently part of the Masia 360, a strategic project seeking to add cooperation between club's various departments.

Llorens was nominated for The Best FIFA Women's Coach in 2017.

== Honours ==
- Catalan Super Cup: 2009, 2010, 2011, 2013, 2014, 2015, 2016, 2016
- Copa de la Reina: 2010–11, 2012–13, 2013–14, 2016–17
- Women's Football Superleague: 2011–12, 2012–13, 2013–14, 2014–15

Source: Official website of FC Barcelona
