= Guruceta Trophy =

Spanish award issued by MARCA

In Spanish football, the Guruceta trophy is awarded by Spanish sports newspaper MARCA to the best referee for each season. It is named in honour of the famous Spanish referee, Emilio Guruceta.

== Rules ==
After every match the MARCA journalist covering the match will evaluate the referees performance with a score out of 3 - 3 being the best and 0 the worst. At the end of the season a coefficient will be calculated between the number of matches refereed and the number of points awarded. The referee with the highest coefficient wins the trophy.

== Winners ==
=== La Liga ===
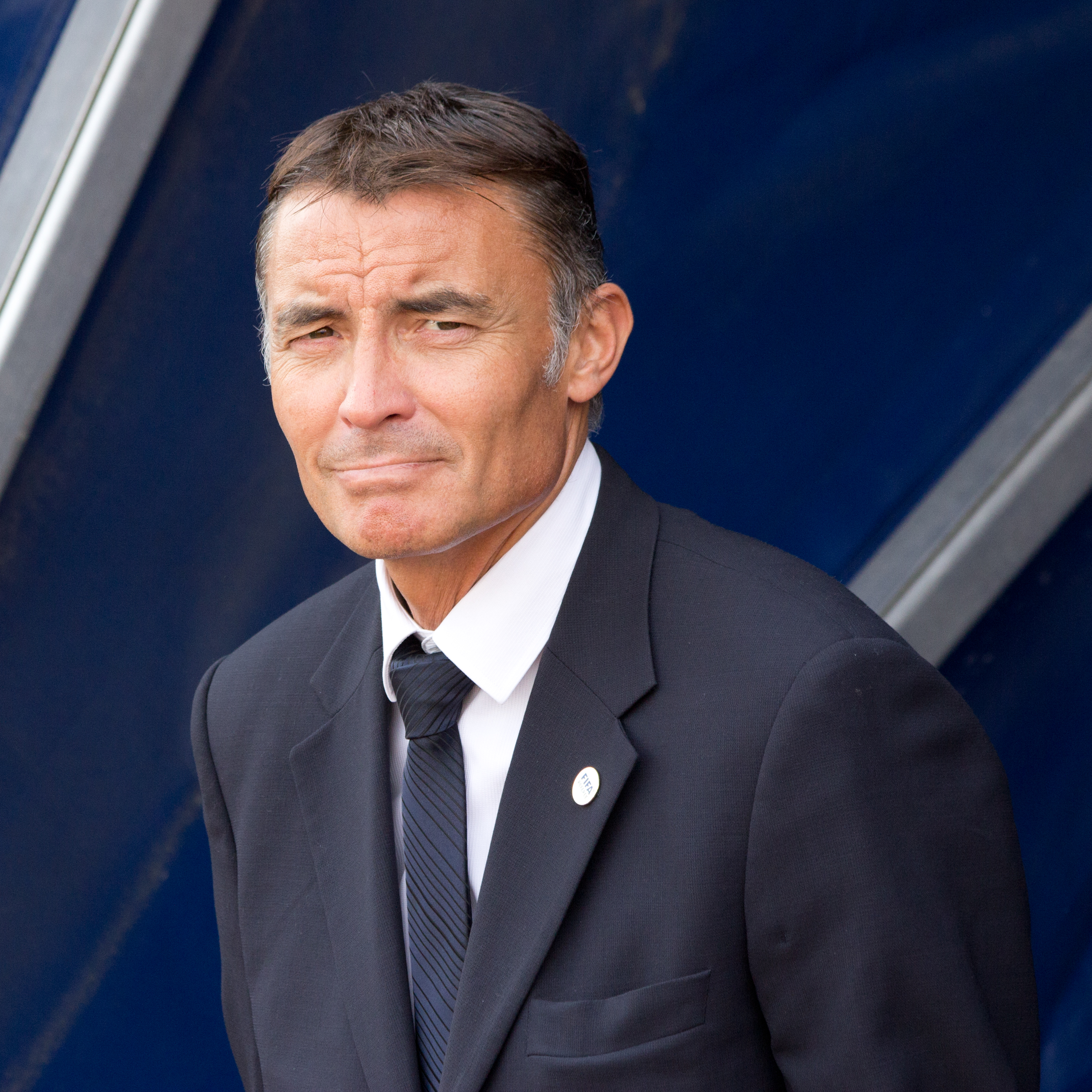
Mejuto González won the trophy three times.

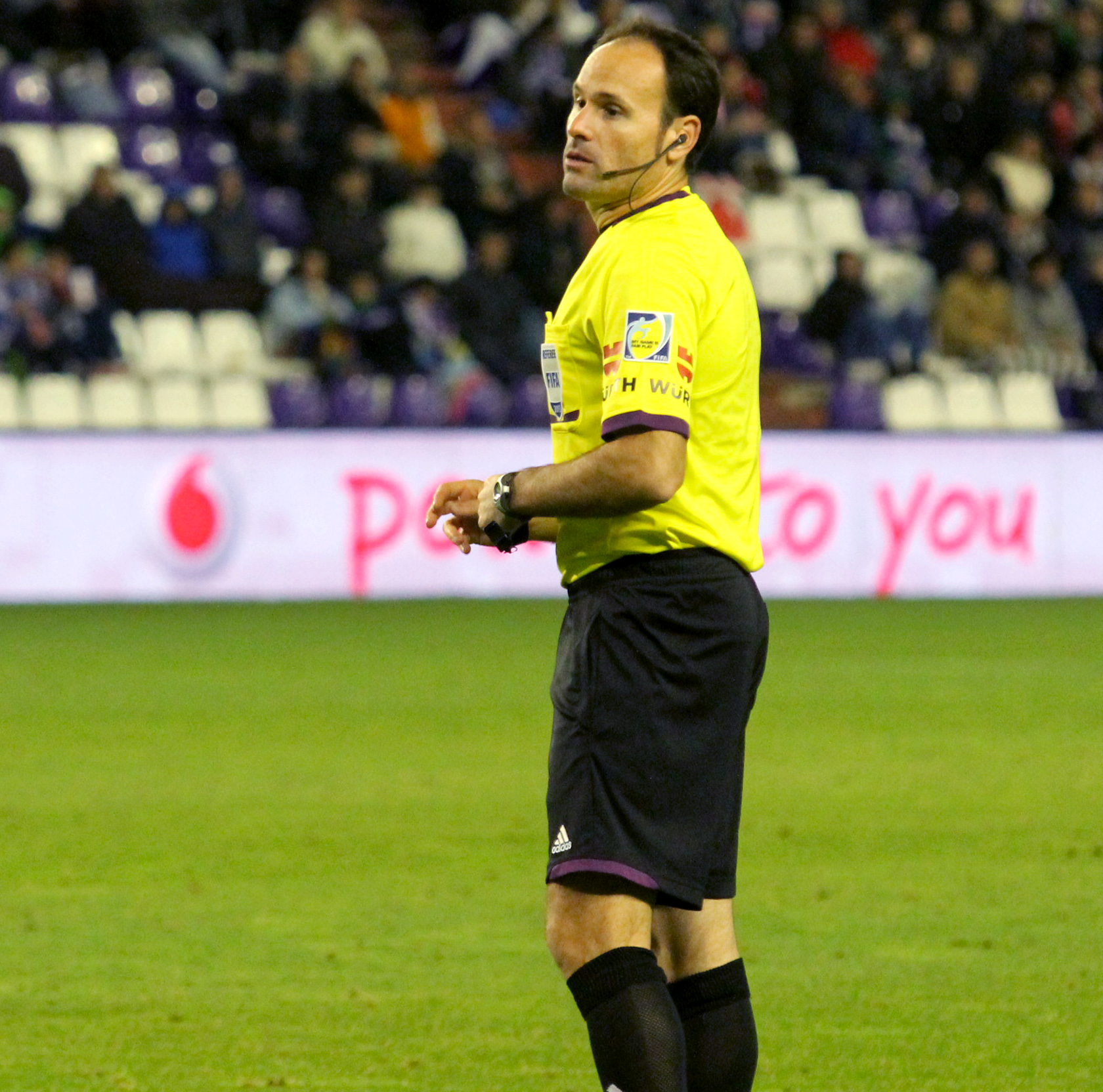
Mateu Lahoz won the trophy twice.

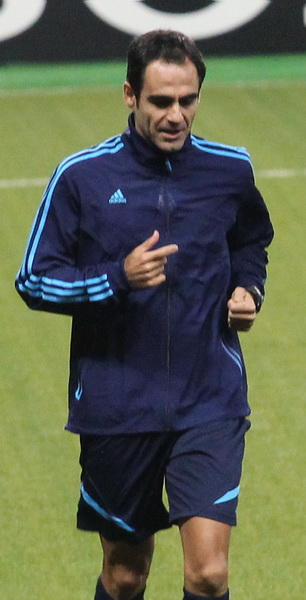
Velasco Carballo also won twice the trophy.

Season	Referee(s)
1986–87	Jiménez Moreno and Soriano Aladrén
1987–88	Martín Navarrete
1988–89	Ramos Marcos
1989–90	Ramos Marcos
1990–91	Andújar Oliver
1991–92	Díaz Vega
1992–93	Andújar Oliver
1993–94	López Nieto
1994–95	López Nieto
1995–96	López Nieto
1996–97	López Nieto
1997–98	Díaz Vega
1998–99	Prados García
1999–2000	López Nieto
2000–01	García Aranda
2001–02	Iturralde González and Mejuto González
2002–03	Mejuto González
2003–04	Mejuto González
2004–05	Losantos Omar
2005–06	Esquinas Torres
2006–07	Undiano Mallenco
2007–08	Megía Dávila
2008–09	Megía Dávila
2009–10	Undiano Mallenco
2010–11	Mateu Lahoz
2011–12	Delgado Ferreiro
2012–13	Velasco Carballo
2013–14	Mateu Lahoz
2014–15	Hernández Hernández
2015–16	Velasco Carballo
2016–17	Martínez Munuera
2017–18	Del Cerro Grande
2018–19	Del Cerro Grande
2019-20	Pizarro Gómez
2020-21	Alberola Rojas

=== Segunda División ===
Season	Referee
1993–94	Antoñana Moraza
1994–95	Puentes Leira
1995–96	Medina Cantalejo
1996–97	Román González
1997–98	Román González
1998–99	Muñiz Fernández
1999–2000	Amilburu Santamaría
2000–01	Román González
2001–02	Román González
2002–03	Delgado Ferreiro
2003–04	Fernández Hinijosa
2004–05	Fernández Hinijosa
2005–06	González González
2006–07	Cerro Grande
2007–08	Perez Lima
