= Raquel Peña (footballer) =

Spanish footballer (born 1988)

Personal information
- Full name: Raquel Peña Rodríguez
- Date of birth: 20 December 1988 (age 37)
- Place of birth: Las Palmas, Spain
- Height: 1.59 m (5 ft 3 in)
- Position: Defender

Team information
- Current team: Tenerife
- Number: 23

Senior career*
Years	Team	Apps	(Gls)
- Arguineguín
2009	Tacuense		
2010	Las Palmas		
2010–2014	Atlético Madrid		
2014–	Granadilla	122	(19)

International career
2009–	Spain	1	(0)
- * Club domestic league appearances and goals

Raquel Peña Rodríguez (born 20 December 1988), also known as Pisco, is a Spanish footballer who plays as a defender for Atlético Madrid in the Spanish First Division.

In September 2009, she became the second Canarian female footballer to play for the Spain national team, making her debut in the 2011 World Cup qualifying against Malta.
