= Maddi Torre =

Spanish footballer (born 1996)

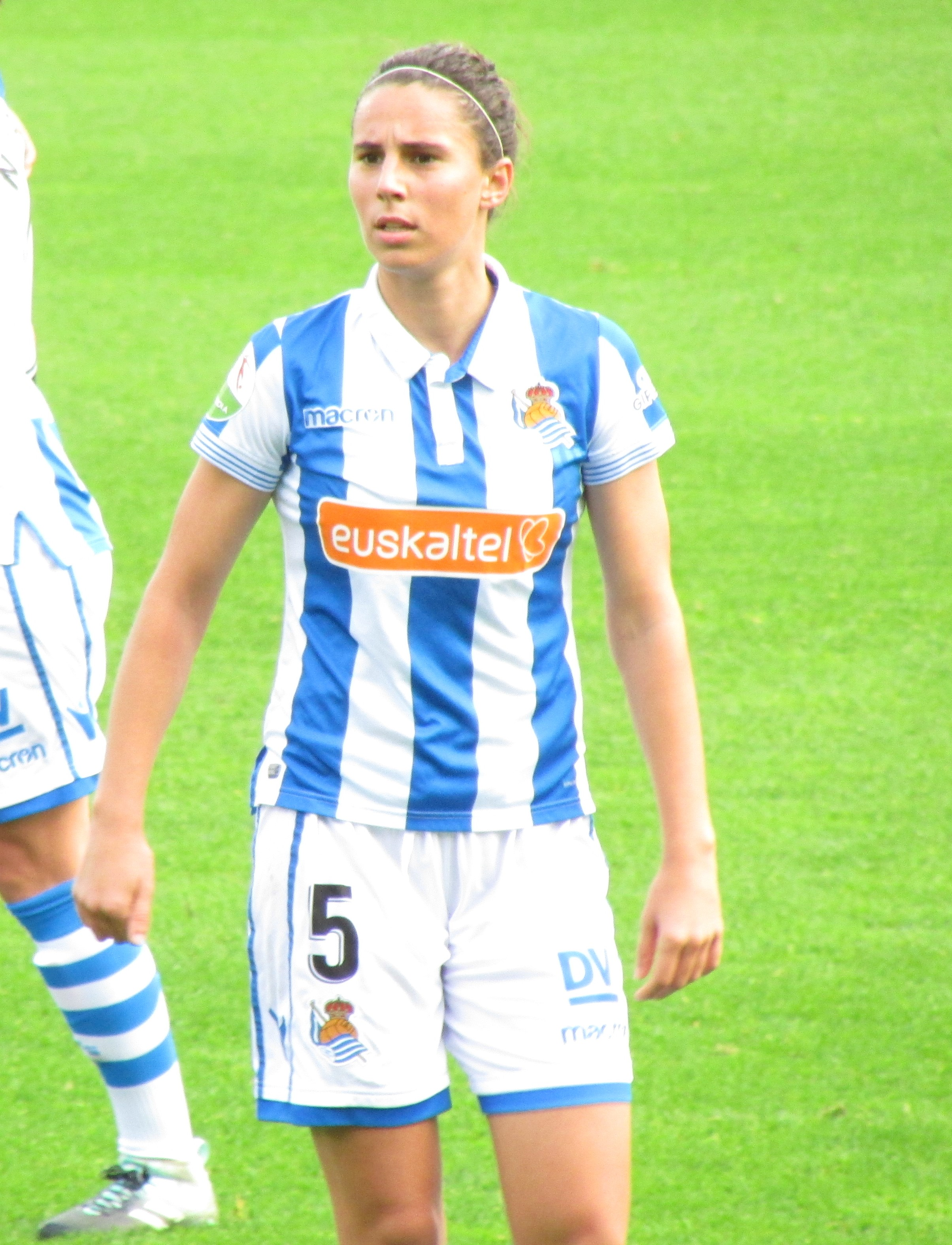
- Torre with Real Sociedad

Personal information
- Full name: Maddi Torre Larrañaga
- Date of birth: 30 March 1996 (age 30)
- Place of birth: San Sebastián, Spain
- Height: 1.72 m (5 ft 8 in)
- Position: Defender

Team information
- Current team: Athletic Club
- Number: 2

Youth career
- 2008–2010: Bizkerre

Senior career*
Years	Team	Apps	(Gls)
2010–2011	Bizkerre		
2011–2015	Athletic Club B	76	(6)
2015–2016	Athletic Club	13	(1)
2016–2017	Santa Teresa	29	(2)
2017–2018	Real Betis	10	(0)
2018–2023	Real Sociedad	89	(2)
2023–	Athletic Club	58	(3)

International career
2013	Spain U17	1	(1)
- * Club domestic league appearances and goals as of 25 July 2025

Maddi Torre Larrañaga (born 30 March 1996) is a Spanish footballer who plays as a defender for Athletic Club. She began her career at Athletic and has also played for Santa Teresa, Real Betis and Real Sociedad.

== Club career ==
Born in San Sebastián and raised in Sopela (Biscay), Torre started her career in the youth academy of Bizkerre in Getxo. She signed for Athletic Club in 2011, spending most of her time there developing in the B-team, although in 2015–16 she made her Primera División debut and contributed 13 appearances (all but one as a substitute) and one goal as Athletic won the title. That summer Torre moved on to Santa Teresa, switching to Real Betis in 2017 and to hometown club Real Sociedad a year later; she missed their Copa de la Reina victory in 2019 due to a pre-match injury.

In 2023 she rejoined Athletic Club on a three-year contract. She was the only outfield player in Liga F to play every minute of the 2023–24 season, in which her team finished fifth.
