= 2017–18 Levante UD Femenino season =

Levante UD Femenino
2017–18 season
- Chairman: Quico Catalán
- Manager: Andrés Tudela (until February 13); Kino García
- Stadium: Buñol Sports City
- Primera División: Eighth
- Copa de la Reina: Quarterfinalist
- Top goalscorer: Charlyn Corral (25)
- Highest home attendance: 14,000
- Lowest home attendance: 50
Home colours	Away colours	Third colours

The 2017–18 season of Levante UD Femenino was the 19th season of the women's team of football club Levante UD. The team was 8th in Primera División and a quarterfinalist in the Copa de la Reina.

== Season summary ==
Levante had ended the previous season's championship in the 4th position, same as in 2015–16, ending the league campaign on a positive note by defeating Barcelona, which needed a victory and an Atlético Madrid miss to win the title, after a 4-game away losing streak including a record 6–0 defeat against local rival Valencia in Mestalla before an attendance of 17,000. Valencia ended the competition third with an unseen 11 point advantage over Levante.

Few days later it was reported in the media that the squad's captains had expressed a lack of tune with manager Andrés Tudela, who had its contract renewed for two more seasons in April, along with objections to the planning of the trainings and an alleged lack of functionality in the section's structure in a meeting with the club's chairman, Quico Catalán. After a loss against lower-ranked Granadilla in the Copa de la Reina's quarterfinals against lower-ranked Granadilla put an end to the season, it was reported that this rift would likely result in the departure of over half the squad.

In the end ten players left the team in the summer transfer market, including internationals Noelia Bermúdez, Raquel Infante, Olivia Oprea, Nagore Calderón, Adriana Martín and María José Pérez, with Bermúdez joining Valencia along with Andrea Esteban. Levante signed Noelia Ramos, Patricia Padilla, Natalia Ramos, Alba Aznar, Marta Cardona and 6-times league champion Miriam Diéguez within Primera División, and Greta Espinoza, 2017 Euro finalist Sofie Junge Pedersen and Jéssica Silva from abroad. After five seasons working on a €250,000 budget, the team's was increased to €300,000, the highest in nearly a decade.

Levante won 7 of the 13 first games of the championship, settling in the 4th position near the halfway point of the league with two victories over direct rivals Athletic Bilbao and Valencia. However, two wide losses against Atlético and Barcelona started a 5-games losing streak and by February the team had plummeted to the 8th position. On February 13, Andrés Tudela was sacked following a draw against newly-promoted Madrid. It was the third dismissal of a manager in the campaign, after Real Sociedad's Juanjo Arregi and Madrid's Jesús Núñez.

Tudela was replaced by Kino García, the coach of the section's B team. After a 0–6 debut rout over Espanyol, the team attained an essential three home games winning streak, but lost the remaining seven games in the championship and ended it in the 8th spot, barely qualifying for the Copa de la Reina on the head-to-head over Sporting Huelva thanks to Madrid losing its last game. This was Levante's worst result in the championship since the 2010–11 season, after six seasons always ending either 4th or 5th. Charlyn Corral scored 25 goals, more than those scored by the rest of the team combined, and she was the top scorer of the championship with a five goals over Atlético's Sonia Bermúdez. She is to become the second Mexican player awarded the Pichichi Trophy after Hugo Sánchez.

In the Copa de la Reina Levante faced defending champion Barcelona in the quarterfinals, and lost both games by single goals scored by former Levante player Alexia Putellas.

== Transfers ==
In				Out			
Date	Pos.	Player	Origin	Date	Pos.	Player	Destination
24 May 2017	DF	(Spain) Patricia Padilla	(Spain) Albacete	9 Jun 2017	MF	(Spain) Alba Merino	(Spain) Santa Teresa
7 Jun 2017	MF	(Spain) Alba Aznar	(Spain) Zaragoza	14 Jun 2017	DF	(Spain) Mariajo Rocafull	(Spain) Aldaia
7 Jun 2017	MF	(Spain) Marta Cardona	(Spain) Zaragoza	16 Jun 2017	FW	(Spain) Adriana Martín	(Spain) Málaga
20 Jun 2017	GK	(Spain) Noelia Ramos	(Spain) Granadilla	30 Jun 2017	FW	(Spain) Sheila Guijarro	(Spain) Málaga
20 Jun 2017	DF	(Spain) Natalia Ramos	(Spain) Granadilla	2 Jul 2017	DF	(Spain) Nagore Calderón	(Spain) Sevilla
30 Jun 2017	FW	(Portugal) Jéssica Silva	(Portugal) Sporting Braga	4 Jul 2017	FW	(Spain) María José Pérez	(Spain) Granadilla
4 Jul 2017	DF	(Mexico) Greta Espinoza	(United States) Oregon State Beavers	6 Jul 2017	FW	(Spain) Andrea Esteban	(Spain) Valencia ^{(2017–18)}
9 Aug 2017	MF	(Spain) Miriam Diéguez	(Spain) Barcelona ^{(2016–17)}	7 Jul 2017	GK	(Costa Rica) Noelia Bermúdez	(Spain) Valencia ^{(2017–18)}
11 Aug 2017	MF	(Denmark) Sofie Junge Pedersen	(Sweden) Rosengård	19 Jul 2017	DF	(Romania) Olivia Oprea	(Spain) Sevilla
				10 Aug, 2017	DF	(Portugal) Raquel Infante	(France) Rodez

== Results ==
=== Pre-season ===
4 August 2017 COTIF – G1	Valencia	1–0	Levante	(Valencian Community) L'Alcúdia
	Borini 67'	Report

6 August 2017 COTIF – G2	Levante	2–1	Morocco (national team)	(Valencian Community) L'Alcúdia
	Gutiérrez 35'; Casado 55'	Report	Hayat 30'

8 August 2017 COTIF – G3	Levante	2–3	Atlético Madrid	(Valencian Community) L'Alcúdia
	Corral 11', 16'	Report	Calligaris 30'; Falcón 42', 72'

10 August 2017 COTIF – G4	Levante	1–0	Albi	(Valencian Community) L'Alcúdia
	Merino 51'	Report

19 August 2017 Friendly	Levante	3–2	Aldaia	(Valencian Community) Buñol
	Corral 16', 37', 43'	Report	Pinel; Cañaveras

22 August 2017 Friendly	Zaragoza	0–0	Levante	(Aragon) Zaragoza
		Report

26 August 2017 Friendly	Albacete	1–3	Levante	(Castilla–La Mancha) Albacete
	Matsukawa 66'	Report	Corral 40'; Jiménez 55' (?)

=== Primera División ===
3 September 2017 1	Levante	1–1	Madrid	(Valencian Community) Paiporta
17:00	Corral 2'	Report	Mascaró 16'	Stadium: El Terrer Municipal Field; Attendance: 600; Referee: (Canary Islands) Huerta de Aza

10 September 2017 2	Granadilla	1–2	Levante	(Canary Islands) Granadilla de Abona
13:00	Pérez 45'	Report	Guehai 25'; Corral 60'	Stadium: Francisco Suárez Football Field; Attendance: 600; Referee: (Catalonia) Sánchez Miguel

23 September 2017 3	Levante	0–1	Betis	(Valencian Community) Buñol
16:00		Report	Parra 78'	Stadium: Buñol Sports City; Attendance: 350; Referee: (Catalonia) Acevedo Dudley

1 October 2017 4	Sevilla	5–5	Levante	(Andalusia) Sevilla
12:00	Piemonte 18', 62'; Carmona 47'; Albarrán 69'; Morilla 85'	Report	da Silva 2', 53'; Corral 42', 65'; Na. Ramos 44'	Stadium: Viejo Nervión Stadium; Attendance: 300; Referee: (Community of Madrid) Kinga-Hajnalka

8 October 2017 5	Levante	1–1	Espanyol	(Valencian Community) Buñol
12:00	Corral 33'	Report	Roque 90+6'	Stadium: Buñol Sports City; Attendance: 300; Referee: (Andalusia) Villegas Navas

14 October 2017 6	Rayo Vallecano	0–4	Levante	(Community of Madrid) Madrid
16:00		Report	Corral 25', 79'; Pedersen 49'; Corral 79'	Stadium: Rayo Vallecano Fundation Sports City; Attendance: 250; Referee: (Aragon) Frías Acedo

29 October 2017 7	Sporting Huelva	0–1	Levante	(Andalusia) Huelva
12:15		Report	Corral 48'	Stadium: La Orden Federative Fields; Attendance: 400; Referee: (Catalonia) Líndez Ciurana

4 November 2017 8	Levante	5–1	Zaragoza	(Valencian Community) Buñol
16:00	da Silva 18', 61'; Corral 49', 90+2'; Pérez 90+6'	Report	López 56'	Stadium: Buñol Sports City; Attendance: 250; Referee: (Castile and León) González Sánchez

9 November 2017 9	Albacete	1–0	Levante	(Castilla–La Mancha) Albacete
18:30	Rodríguez 34'	Report		Stadium: Andrés Iniesta Sports City; Attendance: 568; Referee: (Region of Murcia) Martínez Martínez

18 November 2017 10	Levante	1–1	Real Sociedad	(Valencian Community) Buñol
10:45	Guehai 89'	Report	Zornoza 31'	Stadium: Buñol Sports City; Attendance: 350; Referee: (Andalusia) Prieto Martínez

3 December 2017 11	Santa Teresa	0–3	Levante	(Extremadura) Badajoz
12:00		Report	Casado 11', 77'; Corral 80'	Stadium: El Viejo Vivero Sports City; Attendance: 500; Referee: (Asturias) Fernández Ceferino

6 December 2017 12	Levante	3–2	Athletic Bilbao	(Valencian Community) Buñol
10:45	Corral 16', 21', 32'	Report	Díez 39'; Gimbert 77'	Stadium: Buñol Sports City; Attendance: 350; Referee: (Andalusia) Prieto Martínez

3 December 2017 13	Valencia	2–3	Levante UD	(Valencian Community) Paterna
10:45	Vilas 36'; Peiró 90+1'	Report	Álvarez 62' (pen.); Casado 75', 82'	Stadium: Antoni Puchades Stadium; Attendance: 1,600; Referee: (Canary Islands) Huerta de Aza

16 December 2017 14	Levante	0–4	Atlético Madrid	(Valencian Community) Buñol
16:00		Report	da Silva 28', 47'; Sampedro 49'; Sosa 75'	Stadium: Buñol Sports City; Attendance: 350; Referee: (Region of Murcia) Martínez Madrona

7 January 2018 15	Barcelona	5–0	Levante	(Catalonia) Sant Joan Despí
13:00	Bussaglia 9'; Guijarro 13', 23'; Putellas 43'; Martens 55'	Report		Stadium: Joan Gamper Sports City; Attendance: 670; Referee: Villegas Navas

13 January 2018 16	Madrid	2–1	Levante	(Community of Madrid) San Sebastián de los Reyes
16:00	Mascaró 68'; Boho 85'	Report	Corral 22' (pen.)	Stadium: Matapiñonera Municipal Stadium; Attendance: 150; Referee: (Asturias) Fernández Ceferino

28 January 2018 17	Levante	0–1	Granadilla	(Valencian Community) Buñol
12:00		Report	Pérez 72'	Stadium: Buñol Sports City; Attendance: 50; Referee: (Galicia (Spain)) González González

4 February 2018 18	Betis	2–0	Levante	(Andalusia) Seville
13:00	Moreno 30', 65'	Report		Stadium: Luis del Sol Sports City; Attendance: 418; Referee: (Aragon) Cebollada López

10 February 2018 19	Levante	1–1	Sevilla	(Valencian Community) Buñol
10:45	Corral 86'	Report	Morilla 6'	Stadium: Buñol Sports City; Attendance: 150; Referee: (Region of Murcia) Martínez Martínez

18 February 2018 20	Espanyol	0–6	Levante	(Catalonia) Sant Adrià de Besòs
12:30		Report	Corral 4', 16', 56', 80'; Prim 19'; Pérez 67' (o.g.)	Stadium: Dani Jarque Sports City; Attendance: 325; Referee: (Andalusia) Prieto Martínez

25 February 2018 21	Levante	2–3	Rayo Vallecano	(Valencian Community) Buñol
12:00	López 25'; Marín 79'	Report	Pablos 9' (pen.), 55'; Morales 84'	Stadium: Buñol Sports City; Attendance: 275; Referee: (Catalonia) Sánchez Miguel

11 March 2018 22	Levante	2–1	Sporting Huelva	(Valencian Community) Buñol
12:45	Casado 75'; Corral 76'	Report	Bernal 38'	Stadium: Buñol Sports City; Attendance: 256; Referee: (Basque Country (autonomous community)) Rivera Olmedo

18 March 2018 23	Zaragoza	3–0	Levante	(Aragon) Zaragoza
12:00	Darlene 5'; Mayara 27'; Mallada 68'	Report		Stadium: Pedro Sancho Stadium; Attendance: 550; Referee: (Basque Country (autonomous community)) Arregui Gamir

24 March 2018 24	Levante	4–2	Albacete	(Valencian Community) Buñol
16:30	Casado 74'; Guehai 76'; Matsukawa 78' (o.g.); Corral 84'	Report	Redondo 13', 90'	Stadium: Buñol Sports City; Attendance: 200; Referee: (Andalusia) Villegas Navas

30 March 2018 25	Real Sociedad	2–1	Levante	(Basque Country (autonomous community)) Lasarte-Oria
12:00	García 21'; Ramajo 37'	Report	Pérez 51'	Stadium: Zubieta Facilities; Attendance: 1,000; Referee: (Castile and León) González Sánchez

15 April 2018 26	Levante	3–0	Santa Teresa	(Valencian Community) Buñol
12:00	Corral 13' (pen.), 62', 90+1'	Report		Stadium: Buñol Sports City; Attendance: 250; Referee: (Canary Islands) Huerta de Aza

21 April 2018 27	Athletic Bilbao	1–0	Levante	(Basque Country (autonomous community)) Lezama
10:45	Vázquez 12'	Report		Stadium: Lezama Facilities; Attendance: 526; Referee: (Community of Madrid) Kinga-Hajnalka

28 April 2018 28	Levante	0–1	Valencia	(Valencian Community) València
13:00		Report	Lomba 36'	Stadium: Ciutat de València Stadium; Attendance: 14,000; Referee: (Region of Murcia) Martínez Madrona

5 May 2018 29	Atlético Madrid	1–0	Levante	(Community of Madrid) Majadahonda
18:15	Bermúdez 3'	Report		Stadium: Cerro del Espino Mini Stadium; Attendance: 1,224; Referee: (Aragon) Frías Acedo

13 May 2018 30	Levante	0–5	Barcelona	(Valencian Community) Buñol
16:00		Report	Guijarro 18'; Martens 30'; Torrjeón 60'; Andressa 65'; Andonova 85'	Stadium: Buñol Sports City; Attendance: 600; Referee: (Galicia (Spain)) González González

Pos	Team	Pld	W	D	L	GF	GA	GD	Pts	Qualification or relegation
6	Betis	30	14	4	12	40	37	+3	46	Qualification for the Copa de la Reina
7	Real Sociedad	30	10	8	12	42	37	+5	38 (Note: Levante 1–1 1–2 Real Sociedad; Sporting de Huelva 0–1 1–2 Levante)	Qualification for the Copa de la Reina
8	Levante	30	11	5	14	49	50	−1	38	Qualification for the Copa de la Reina
9	Sporting de Huelva	30	11	5	14	35	42	−7	38	
10	Madrid CFF	30	10	6	14	34	56	−22	36	

Source: La Liga, Soccerway
Rules for classification: 1) points; 2) head-to-head points; 3) goal difference; 4) number of goals scored

=== Copa de la Reina ===
20 May 2018 QF – L1	Barcelona	1–0	Levante	(Catalonia) Sant Joan Despí
16:00	Putellas 53'	Report		Stadium: Joan Gamper Sports City; Attendance: 309; Referee: (Andalusia) Villegas Navas

23 May 2018 QF – L2	Levante	0–1	Levante	(Valencian Community) Buñol
17:00		Report	Putellas 82'	Stadium: Buñol Sports City; Attendance: 600; Referee: (Castile and León) Peláez Arnillas

== Primera División statistics ==
No.	Pos.	Born	Since	FIFA		Player	Games	Goals	Disciplinary record	
No.	Pos.	Born	Since	Nationality	FC	Player	Games	Goals	Booked	Sent off (straight red)
1	GK	1999	2016–17	Spain		Sandra Torres	6	0	0	0
2	DF	1995	2017–18	Mexico	2014	Greta Espinoza	15	0	1	0
3	DF	1996	2017–18	Spain		Patricia Padilla	0	0	0	0
4	DF	1984	2011–12	Spain		Sonia Prim	27	1	7	1
5	MF	1994	2013–14	Spain		Laura Gutiérrez	24	0	7	0
6	DF	1998	2015–16	Spain		Andrea Palacios	6	0	1	0
7	MF	1992	2012–13	Spain		Ana Buceta	6	0	0	0
8	FW	1996	2015–16	Spain		Lucía Gómez	28	0	5	0
9	MF	1995	2015–16	Spain		Maitane López	27	1	3	1
10	FW	1991	2015–16	Mexico	2011	Charlyn Corral	29	25	5	0
11	MF	1993	2017–18	Spain		Alba Aznar	21	0	1	0
12	FW	1998	2017–18	Spain		Maribel Ortega	4	0	0	0
13	GK	1999	2017–18	Spain		Noelia Ramos	24	0	0	0
14	MF	1994	2011–12	Spain		Nerea Pérez	25	2	3	0
15	DF	1999	2017–18	Spain		Natalia Ramos	21	3	3	0
16	MF	1986	2017–18	Spain	2005	Miriam Diéguez	30	0	3	0
17	FW	1990	2012–13	Spain	2009	Alharilla Casado	30	6	4	0
18	FW	1994	2017–18	Portugal	2011	Jéssica Silva	20	4	2	0
19	MF	1995	2017–18	Spain		Marta Cardona	27	0	2	0
20	MF	1994	2016–17	Ivory Coast	2011	Ida Guehai	19	3	2	0
21	MF	1996	2014–15	Spain		Carol Marín	19	1	0	0
22	MF	1992	2017–18	Denmark	2011	Sofie Junge Pedersen	24	1	1	0
30	DF	1997	2016–17	Spain		Andrea Jiménez	1	0	0	0
