= 2017–18 Valencia CF Femenino season =

Valencia CF Femenino
2017–18 season
- Chairman: Anil Murthy
- Manager: Jesús Oliva
- Stadium: Antoni Puchades Stadium
- Primera División: Fifth
- Copa de la Reina: Quarterfinalist
- Top goalscorer: María Paz Vilas (19)
- Highest home attendance: 1,600
- Lowest home attendance: 100
| Home colours | Away colours | Third colours |

The Valencia CF Femenino 2017–18 season was the ninth season of the women's football section of Valencia CF. The team ended the championship in 5th position and was eliminated in the national cup's quarterfinals by league champion Atlético Madrid.

== Season summary ==
The 2016–17 season had seen the team attain its best result in the championship yet, third position, and play for the first time in the club's main venue, the Mestalla Stadium. The ambitious project behind this successful season was reported as a personal initiative of president Lay Hoon Chan, but she resigned in mid-season due to the disappointing season by the men's team. The departure of manager Cristian Toro after five seasons was reported in May with one game remaining, and on 20 June, a few days after the team was eliminated in the Copa de la Reina's semifinals by FC Barcelona, his second in command Jesús Oliva was appointed his successor. Oliva, a coach at Valencia Femenino since the team's establishment in 2009, had been the manager of the club's B team that topped the 2015–16 Segunda División's Group 7.

Most of the previous season's key signings left the team, as Estefanía Banini and Yanara Aedo returned to Washington Spirit, and Christiane Endler was transferred to Paris Saint-Germain, with the €30,000 fee to Valencia the first paid transfer in Spanish women's football. Another notable loss was the departure of Claudia Zornoza, who left for Real Sociedad. Jennifer Vreugdenhil, coming from the Eredivisie, replaced Endler as the team's first-choice goalkeeper, and Valencia signed Noelia Bermúdez, Marta Carro, Sandra Hernández and Anair Lomba within the Primera División market. After the championship was underway the team was joined by Nadezhda Karpova, the first Russian to play in the Primera División.

Facing a harsh championship start, the team suffered more defeats in the six first games than in the whole previous campaign against top teams Athletic Bilbao, Atlético Madrid and Barcelona, and wasn't able to dislodge them from the three top positions for the remainder of the season. The team suffered a chain of injuries, and so in the winter window transfer Mandy van den Berg, who had finished her WSL campaign with Reading, was signed to make up for the long-time absences of Natalia Gaitán and Paula Nicart in the team's defense.

Unlike the previous season, the Valencia derby on 9 December was scheduled for the team's usual ground at the Ciudad Deportiva de Paterna rather than in the Mestalla, and it was reported in the media that the club intended to reserve its main venue for the male team. All political parties in the Valencian Courts issued an institutional statement demanding the club to allow the team to play in Mestalla. Hours later the club replied with a statement defending its social policies for gender equality and women's sport, regretting the criticisms as an alleged lack of awareness of its commitment and leaving an open door to eventual future appearances of the women's team in Mestalla. Months later, the away derby fixture was staged in Levante's main venue, the Ciutat de València Stadium, before a crowd of 14,000.

By mid-April, a seven games non-winning streak left Valencia in sixth position, with a 4 points advantage to defend in the last four games in order to qualify for the Copa de la Reina. Valencia won all four games and surpassed Betis in the table, ending fifth. The Cup's draw matched Valencia with league champion Atlético, which resulted in defeats in both games. One week later Jesús Oliva was sacked, but he stayed in the women's team as its academy's coordinator, while Óscar Suárez succeeded him as the team's new manager.

== Transfers ==
| In | | | | Out | | | |
| Date | Pos. | Player | Origin | Date | Pos. | Player | Destination |
|---|---|---|---|---|---|---|---|
| 2017–07–04 | MF | (Spain) Sandra Hernández | (Spain) Barcelona | 2017–06–19 | MF | (Argentina) Estefanía Banini | (United States) Washington Spirit |
| 2017–07–06 | GK | (Costa Rica) Noelia Bermúdez | (Spain) Levante | 2017–06–22 | MF | (Spain) Esther Romero | Retirement |
| 2017–07–06 | GK | (Spain) Andrea Esteban | (Spain) Levante | 2017–06–27 | FW | (Chile) Yanara Aedo | (United States) Washington Spirit |
| 2017–07–11 | DF | (Spain) Marta Carro | (Spain) Madrid | 2017–06–29 | GK | (Spain) Esther Sullastres | (Spain) Zaragoza |
| 2017–07–14 | MF | (Spain) Anair Lomba | (Spain) Espanyol | 2017–07–03 | DF | (Spain) Sara Micó | (Spain) Sporting Plaza de Argel |
| 2017–07–18 | GK | (Netherlands) Jennifer Vreugdenhil | (Netherlands) ADO Den Haag | 2017–07–05 | GK | (Chile) Christiane Endler | (France) Paris Saint-Germain |
| 2017–09–22 | FW | (Russia) Nadezhda Karpova | (Russia) Chertanovo | 2017–07–05 | MF | (Spain) Claudia Florentino | (Spain) Albacete |
| 2018–01–08 | DF | (Netherlands) Mandy van den Berg | (England) Reading | 2017–07–10 | MF | (Spain) Claudia Zornoza | (Spain) Real Sociedad |
| | | | | 2017–07–28 | MF | (Japan) Maya Yamamoto | (Spain) Zaragoza |

== Results ==
Win Draw Loss Postponed

=== Pre-season ===
| 4 August 2017 COTIF – G1 | Valencia | 1–0 | Levante | (Valencian Community) L'Alcúdia (Els Arcs) |
| 19:15 | Borini 67' | Report | | Attendance: 1,600; Referee: Fuentes Molina |

| 7 August 2017 COTIF – G2 | Valencia | 2–0 | Atlético Madrid | (Valencian Community) L'Alcúdia (Els Arcs) |
| 17:30 | Borini 42'; Cubedo 49' | Report | | Referee: Frigols Sancho |

| 9 August 2017 COTIF – G3 | Valencia | 2–0 | Albi | (Valencian Community) L'Alcúdia (Els Arcs) |
| 17:30 | Peiró 5'; Esteban 22' | Report | | Stadium: Els Arcs; Referee: Tórtola García |

| 10 August 2017 COTIF – G4 | Valencia | 0–1 | Morocco (national team) | (Valencian Community) L'Alcúdia (Els Arcs) |
| 19:15 | | Report | Meryem 55' | Stadium: Els Arcs; Referee: Barceló Gómez |

| 11 August 2017 COTIF – F | Valencia | 1–3 | Atlético Madrid | (Valencian Community) L'Alcúdia (Els Arcs) |
| 20:15 | Borini 28' | Report | Bermúdez 21'; Carro 25' (o.g.); Bautista 44' | Stadium: Els Arcs; Attendance: 4,000; Referee: Amorós Ramírez |

| 14 August 2017 MIFT – G1 | Valencia | 1–2 | Montpellier | (Community of Madrid) Fuenlabrada (La Aldehuela) |
| 11:00 |

| 15 August 2017 MIFT – G2 | Valencia | 0–3 | Anderlecht | (Community of Madrid) Fuenlabrada (La Aldehuela) |
| 13:00 |

| 16 August 2017 MIFT – G3 | Atlético Madrid | 1–1 | Valencia | (Community of Madrid) Fuenlabrada (La Aldehuela) |
| 13:00 |

=== Primera División ===
| 2 September 2017 1 | Real Sociedad | 0–1 | Valencia | (Basque Country (autonomous community)) Usurbil (Zubieta) |
| | | Report | Vilas 56' | Attendance: 500; Referee: (Castile and León) Peláez Arnillas |

| 10 September 2017 2 | Valencia | 1–1 | Santa Teresa | (Valencian Community) Paterna (Antoni Puchades) |
| | Vilas 6' | Report | Lima 45' | Attendance: 400; Referee: (Catalonia) Líndez Ciurana |

| 24 September 2017 3 | Athletic Bilbao | 3–2 | Valencia | (Basque Country (autonomous community)) Lezama (Facilities) |
| | Corres 10', 76'; Zárate 80' | Report | Vilas 16'; Borini 84' | Attendance: 471; Referee: (Asturias) Fernández Ceferino |

| 1 October 2017 4 | Valencia | 1–0 | Sporting Huelva | (Valencian Community) Paterna (Antoni Puchades) |
| | Hernández 14' | Report | | Attendance: 450; Referee: (Catalonia) Sánchez Miguel |

| 7 October 2017 5 | Valencia | 0–1 | Atlético Madrid | (Valencian Community) Paterna (Antoni Puchades) |
| | | Report | Corredera 38' | Attendance: 1,250; Referee: (Region of Murcia) Martínez Madrona |

| 14 October 2017 6 | Barcelona | 2–0 | Valencia | (Catalonia) Sant Joan (Joan Gamper) |
| | Duggan 28'; Putellas 76' | Report | | Attendance: 623; Referee: (Canary Islands) Huerta de Aza |

| 29 October 2017 7 | Valencia | 4–0 | Madrid | (Valencian Community) Paterna (Antoni Puchades) |
| | Lomba 44', 64'; Szymanowski 53'; Karpova 72' | Report | | Attendance: 400; Referee: (Galicia (Spain)) González González |

| 5 November 2017 8 | Granadilla | 0–0 | Valencia | (Canary Islands) San Isidro (La Palmera) |
| | | Report | | Attendance: 700; Referee: (Basque Country (autonomous community)) Arregui Gamir |

| 12 November 2017 9 | Valencia | 5–2 | Betis | (Valencian Community) Paterna (Antoni Puchades) |
| | Karpova 2', 62'; Vilas 40'; Lomba 47'; Férez 72' | Report | Borja 48'; Moreno 68' | Attendance: 800; Referee: (Catalonia) Líndez Ciurana |

| 18 November 2017 10 | Sevilla | 1–3 | Valencia | (Andalusia) Seville (Viejo Nervión) |
| | Morilla 63' | Report | Szymanowski 16', 40'; Peiró 22' | Attendance: 186; Referee: (Aragon) Frías Acedo |

| 2 December 2017 11 | Valencia | 1–1 | Espanyol | (Valencian Community) Paterna (Antoni Puchades) |
| | Vilas 60' | Report | del Estal 67' | Attendance: 400; Referee: (Galicia (Spain)) Casal Fernández |

| 18 November 2017 12 | Rayo Vallecano | 4–2 | Valencia | (Community of Madrid) Madrid (Fundación Rayo) |
| | del Álamo 16'; Pablos 48', 73'; Ponciano 86' | Report | Vilas 24'; Férez 57' | Attendance: 186; Referee: (Andalusia) Prieto Martínez |

| 9 December 2017 13 | Valencia | 2–3 | Levante | (Valencian Community) Paterna (Antoni Puchades) |
| | Vilas 36'; Peiró 90+1' | Report | Ramos 62' (pen.); Casado 75', 82' | Attendance: 1,600; Referee: (Canary Islands) Huerta de Aza |

| 16 December 2017 14 | Zaragoza | 1–3 | Valencia | (Aragon) Zaragoza (Pedro Sancho) |
| | Yamamoto 90+2' | Report | Vilas 6'; Férez 72'; Peiró 79' | Attendance: 400; Referee: (Catalonia) Acevedo Dudley |

| 7 January 2018 15 | Valencia | 3–0 | Albacete | (Valencian Community) Paterna (Antoni Puchades) |
| | Szymanowski 5', 33'; Férez 85' | Report | | Referee: (Catalonia) Líndez Ciurana |

| 13 January 2018 16 | Valencia | 3–1 | Real Sociedad | (Valencian Community) Paterna (Antoni Puchades) |
| | Vilas 33', 44', 58' | Report | Beristain 89' | Attendance: 650; Referee: (Aragon) Cebollada López |

| 28 January 2018 17 | Santa Teresa | 1–1 | Valencia | (Extremadura) Badajoz (El Viejo Vivero) |
| | Merino 28' | Report | Szymanowski 70' | Attendance: 600; Referee: (Community of Madrid) Kinga-Hajnalka |

| 4 February 2018 18 | Valencia | 3–1 | Athletic Bilbao | (Valencian Community) Paterna (Antoni Puchades) |
| | Vilas 6', 44'; Hernández 54' | Report | Cirauqui 16' | Attendance: 100; Referee: (Andalusia) Prieto Martínez |

| 11 February 2018 19 | Sporting Huelva | 1–3 | Valencia | (Andalusia) Huelva (La Orden) |
| | Castelló 47' | Report | Vilas 10', 32'; Hernández 89' | Attendance: 100; Referee: (Canary Islands) Huerta de Aza |

| 17 February 2018 20 | Atlético Madrid | 1–0 | Valencia | (Community of Madrid) Majadahonda (Cerro del Espino) |
| | Bermúdez 24' | Report | | Attendance: 463; Referee: (Galicia (Spain)) Casal Fernández |

| 25 February 2018 21 | Valencia | 1–4 | Barcelona | (Valencian Community) Paterna (Antoni Puchades) |
| | Peiró 90+1' | Report | León 4'; Martens 35'; Torrejón 45+1'; Andonova 62' | Attendance: 1,200; Referee: (Castile and León) Contreras Patiño |

| 10 March 2018 22 | Madrid | 2–1 | Valencia | (Community of Madrid) San Sebastián (Matapiñonera) |
| | del Río 72'; Geyse 81' | Report | Peiró 55' | Attendance: 322= Referee: (Region of Murcia) Martínez Madrona |

| 18 March 2018 23 | Valencia | 0–0 | Granadilla | (Valencian Community) Paterna (Antoni Puchades) |
| | | Report | | Attendance: 400; Referee: (Catalonia) Líndez Ciurana |

| 24 March 2018 24 | Betis | 0–0 | Valencia | (Andalusia) Seville (Luis del Sol) |
| | | Report | | Attendance: 350; Referee: (Catalonia) Sánchez Miguel |

| 31 March 2018 25 | Valencia | 1–1 | Sevilla | (Valencian Community) Paterna (Antoni Puchades) |
| | Vilas 73' | Report | Calderón 35' | Attendance: 1,000; Referee: (Basque Country (autonomous community)) Arregui Gamir |

| 15 April 2018 26 | Espanyol | 0–0 | Valencia | (Catalonia) Sant Adrià (Dani Jarque) |
| | | Report | | Attendance: 400; Referee: (Andalusia) Prieto Martínez |

| 22 April 2018 27 | Valencia | 4–1 | Rayo Vallecano | (Valencian Community) Paterna (Antoni Puchades) |
| | Santiago 7' (o.g.); Vilas 32', 44', 49' | Report | Domínguez 80' | Attendance: 400; Referee: (Basque Country (autonomous community)) Rivera Olmedo |

| 28 April 2018 28 | Levante | 0–1 | Valencia | (Valencian Community) Valencia (Ciutat de València) |
| | | Report | Lomba 36' | Attendance: 14,000; Referee: (Region of Murcia) Martínez Madrona |

| 5 May 2018 29 | Valencia | 1–0 | Zaragoza | (Valencian Community) Paterna (Antoni Puchades) |
| | Peiró 90+4' | Report | | Attendance: 900; Referee: (Community of Madrid) Kinga-Hajnalka |

| 12 May 2018 30 | Albacete | 0–2 | Valencia | (Castilla–La Mancha) Albacete (Andrés Iniesta) |
| | | Report | García 35'; Szymanowski 42' | Attendance: 250; Referee: (Catalonia) Acevedo Dudley |

Final table
| Pos | Team | Pld | W | D | L | GF | GA | Pts | Qualification or relegation |
|---|---|---|---|---|---|---|---|---|---|
| 3 | Athletic Bilbao | 30 | 18 | 2 | 10 | 51 | 41 | 56 | Qualification for the Copa de la Reina |
| 4 | Granadilla | 30 | 16 | 6 | 8 | 48 | 33 | 54 | Qualification for the Copa de la Reina |
| 5 | Valencia | 30 | 14 | 8 | 8 | 49 | 32 | 50 | Qualification for the Copa de la Reina |
| 6 | Betis | 30 | 14 | 4 | 12 | 40 | 37 | 46 | Qualification for the Copa de la Reina |
| 7 | Real Sociedad | 30 | 10 | 8 | 12 | 42 | 37 | 38 | Qualification for the Copa de la Reina |

=== Copa de la Reina ===
| 19 May 2018 QF – L1 | Atlético Madrid | 2–1 | Valencia | (Community of Madrid) Majadahonda (Cerro del Espino) |
| 20:45 | Corredera 57'; Sampedro 63' | Report | Peiró 37' | Attendance: 916; Referee: (Galicia (Spain)) Casal Fernández |

| 23 May 2018 QF – L2 | Valencia | 1–2 | Atlético Madrid | (Valencian Community) Paterna (Antoni Puchades) |
| 21:00 | Szymanowski 90+5' | Report | Sampedro 9'; Falcón 90+3' | Attendance: 1,700; Referee: (Catalonia) Acevedo Dudley |

== Primera División statistics ==
| No. | Pos. | Born | Since | FIFA | | Player | Games | Goals | Disciplinary record | |
| No. | Pos. | Born | Since | Nationality | FC | Player | Games | Goals | Booked | Sent off (straight red) |
|---|---|---|---|---|---|---|---|---|---|---|
| 1 | GK | 1994 | 2017–18 | Costa Rica | 2014 | Noelia Bermúdez | 2 | 0 | 0 | 0 |
| 2 | DF | 1990 | 2017–18 | Netherlands | 2010 | Mandy van den Berg | 14 | 0 | 0 | 0 |
| 3 | DF | 1994 | 2014–15 | Spain | 2015 | Paula Nicart | 11 | 0 | 0 | 0 |
| 4 | DF | 1992 | 2010–11 | Spain | | Salomé Navalón | 13 | 0 | 2 | 0 |
| 5 | DF | 1994 | 2009–10 | Spain | 2015 | Ivana Andrés | 29 | 0 | 5 | 0 |
| 6 | MF | 1997 | 2017–18 | Spain | 2018 | Sandra Hernández | 28 | 3 | 3 | 0 |
| 7 | MF | 1988 | 2015–16 | Brazil | 2017 | Joyce Borini | 26 | 1 | 6 | 0 |
| 8 | MF | 1998 | 2016–17 | Spain | | Ángeles Carrión | 7 | 0 | 1 | 0 |
| 9 | FW | 1998 | 2016–17 | Spain | | Marta Peiró | 23 | 6 | 1 | 0 |
| 10 | FW | 1988 | 2013–14 | Spain | 2008 | María Paz Vilas | 28 | 19 | 4 | 0 |
| 11 | FW | 1990 | 2016–17 | Argentina | 2014 | Marianela Szymanowski | 27 | 7 | 1 | 0 |
| 13 | GK | 1995 | 2017–18 | Netherlands | 2018 | Jennifer Vreugdenhil | 28 | 0 | 0 | 0 |
| 14 | MF | 1991 | 2014–15 | Spain | 2015 | Carol Férez | 21 | 3 | 1 | 0 |
| 15 | DF | 1991 | 2017–18 | Spain | 2018 | Marta Carro | 29 | 1 | 3 | 0 |
| 16 | MF | 1989 | 2017–18 | Spain | | Anair Lomba | 21 | 4 | 3 | 0 |
| 17 | MF | 1989 | 2016–17 | Spain | 2012 | Débora García | 20 | 1 | 1 | 0 |
| 18 | DF | 1991 | 2015–16 | Colombia | 2011 | Natalia Gaitán | 5 | 0 | 0 | 0 |
| 19 | FW | 1995 | 2017–18 | Russia | 2016 | Nadezhda Karpova | 22 | 3 | 5 | 0 |
| 20 | MF | 1989 | 2013–14 | Spain | | Georgina Carreras | 25 | 0 | 2 | 0 |
| 21 | FW | 1996 | 2017–18 | Spain | | Andrea Esteban | 4 | 0 | 0 | 0 |
| 26 | DF | 1998 | 2013–14 | Spain | | Cintia Montagut | 8 | 0 | 0 | 0 |
| 27 | DF | 1997 | 2016–17 | Spain | | Neus Llinares | 1 | 0 | 0 | 0 |
| 29 | MF | 1998 | 2017–18 | Spain | | Paula Sancho | 19 | 0 | 0 | 0 |
| 30 | DF | 1999 | 2017–18 | Spain | | Cristina Cubedo | 19 | 0 | 2 | 0 |
| | DF | 1997 | 2017–18 | Spain | | Lidia Navarro | 1 | 0 | 0 | 0 |
| | MF | 2000 | 2017–18 | Spain | | Alejandra Serrano | 10 | 0 | 0 | 0 |
| | MF | | 2017–18 | Spain | | Julia Aguado | 1 | 0 | 0 | 0 |
