= 2016–17 Valencia CF (women) season =

Valencia CF Femenino
2016–17 season
- Chairman: Lay Hoon Chan
- Manager: Cristian Toro
- Stadium: Antoni Puchades
- Primera División: Third
- Copa de la Reina: Semifinalist
- Top goalscorer: María Paz Vilas (28)
- Highest home attendance: 17,000
Home colours	Away colours	Third colours

The 2016–17 season was the eighth season of Valencia CF's women's team. In it Valencia attained its best result in Primera División, a third position, and was the team with the fewest goals against in the championship – 11 in 30 games.

On April 23, 2017, the team played for the first team in the Mestalla stadium. A crowd of 17,000 attended a record 6–0 victory over its major rival Levante.

== Season summary ==
=== Background and preseason ===
Valencia CFF ended the 2015–16 Primera División sixth, two positions below the previous edition (which had been their best result to date), while in the Copa de la Reina they reached the semifinals, where they lost against Atlético Madrid after extra time. Following the end of the season team captain Arantxa Lozano and reserve goalkeeper Gemma Rueda retired, leaving new captain Ivana Andrés as the only remaining player from the inaugural 2009–10 squad. Naiara Beristain, Sara Monforte and Mulán Sánchez transferred to other Primera División teams, while Willy Romero was the only 2015–16 signing to leave the club and moved to the Eredivisie.

The club continued the bet for Latin American football they had initiated in the previous two seasons with Joyce Magalhães and Natalia Gaitán. Marianela Szymanowski joined the attack and Tiane Endler, who had returned to Colo-Colo after one season in Chelsea, became the new first-choice goalkeeper. With the season started the club signed players from the NWSL for the first time: Yanara Aedo joined the team in September and Estefi Banini after playing the NWSL final against Western New York Flash. Additionally three national players were signed: former international Débora García for the wings and the U19 international Leles Carrión and Esther Romero for the midfield. Marta Peiró made a breakthrough from the farm team and became the team's second top scorer despite playing few games as a starter.

Valencia played against four Primera División teams and one local Segunda División team in the preseason, earning three wins and two draws. For the first time the team didn't take part in the COTIF Tournament.

=== Season ===
Valencia started the season with three wins before conceding two draws in its two journeys to Andalusia, against Sporting Huelva and newly promoted Betis. Next the team defeated defending champion Athletic Bilbao, which scored the first goal conceded by Valencia in the season after seven games. The team didn't win any games in November, with four draws (including title containding Atlético Madrid and Barcelona) and one lose in the first Valencia derby played in a LFP stadium, the Ciutat de València.

However, this was followed by a remarkable streak up to April with 10 wins in 11 games and only one goal conceded. Following a second draw against Atlético, the club also held the Spring Valencian derby in Mestalla. It was the first time the women's team played in the main stadium, and it attracted a 17,000 crowd. Valencia's previous major win over Levante, 2015–16's 3–0, was surpassed by half-time with a 4–0 scoreline and the game ended as 6–0, Valencia's largest win in the season.

With no Champions League qualifying options, Valencia secured the 3rd place (surpassing the 2014–15 4th position as its best result in the championship) with three games remaining with a 1–3 win over Granadilla. After suffering its second defeat in the season against Barcelona, Valencia won the last two games to end the championship with 68 points – 19 more than in the previous season. Tiane Endler won the Zamora Trophy with a 0.39 coefficient, and Mari Paz Vilas was the third top scorer in the championship with 28 goals in 27 appearances.

In the Copa de la Reina the team made its third appearance in a row in the semifinals by defeating Athletic 3–1. There it lost 1–2 to Barcelona, which won the competition. Vilas scored Valencia's last goal in the season in the additional time. Two Valencia players were subsequently included in Spanish call-up for the UEFA Women's Euro 2017: Paula Nicart and Mari Paz Vilas.

== Transfers ==
In				Out			
Date	Pos.	Player	Origin	Date	Pos.	Player	Destination
2016–06–26	MF	(Spain) Leles Carrión	(Spain) Albacete	2016–06–06	GK	(Spain) Gema Rueda	Retirement
2016–07–01	MF	(Spain) Esther Romero	(Spain) Barcelona	2016–06–08	MF	(Spain) Arantxa Lozano	Retirement
2016–07–06	MF	(Spain) Débora García	(Spain) Atlético Madrid	2016–07–09	MF	(Spain) Sara Monforte	(Spain) Zaragoza
2016–07–11	GK	(Chile) Tiane Endler	(Chile) Colo-Colo	2016–07–12	MF	(Spain) Naiara Beristain	(Spain) Real Sociedad
2016–07–13	FW	(Argentina) Marianela Szymanowski	(Spain) Rayo Vallecano	2016–07–12	DF	(Spain) Mulán Sánchez	(Spain) Real Sociedad
2016–09–23	FW	(Chile) Yanara Aedo	(United States) Washington Spirit	2016–07–15	FW	(Spain) Willy Romero	(Netherlands) Ajax
2016–10–17	MF	(Argentina) Estefi Banini	(United States) Washington Spirit				

== Squad ==
Note: Flags indicate national team as defined under FIFA eligibility rules; some limited exceptions apply. Players may hold more than one non-FIFA nationality.

No.	Pos.	Nation	Player
1	GK	ESP	Esther Sullastres
3	DF	ESP	Paula Nicart
4	DF	ESP	Salo Navalón
5	DF	ESP	Ivana Andrés
6	MF	ESP	Esther Romero
7	MF	BRA	Joyce Magalhães
8	MF	ESP	Leles Carrión
9	FW	CHI	Yanara Aedo
10	FW	ESP	Mari Paz Vilas
11	FW	ARG	Marianela Szymanowski
13	GK	CHI	Tiane Endler
14	FW	ESP	Carol Férez
17	MF	ESP	Débora García

No.	Pos.	Nation	Player
18	DF	COL	Natalia Gaitán
19	MF	ARG	Estefi Banini
20	MF	ESP	Gio Carreras
21	MF	ESP	Claudia Zornoza
22	MF	JPN	Maya Yamamoto
23	FW	ESP	Marta Peiró
24	DF	ESP	Sara Micó
26	DF	ESP	Cintia Montagut
27	DF	ESP	Neus Llinares
28	MF	ESP	Claudia Florentino
29	MF	ESP	Pauleta Sancho
30	MF	ESP	Sara Medina

== Results ==
Win Draw Loss Postponed
Numbers in brackets in league games show the team's position in the table following the match

=== Pre-season ===
6 August 2016 Friendly	Zaragoza	2–2	Valencia	Alcalá de la Selva
11:30	García 18'; Cardona 69'	Report	Peiró 58', 75'

13 August 2016 Friendly	Valencia	4–0	Aldaia	Antoni Puchades, Paterna
10:30	Peiró; Vilas; Florentino	Report

17 August 2016 Friendly	Albacete	1–1	Valencia	Paco Simón, Almansa
	Martínez 51' (pen.)	Report	Carrión 85'	Attendance: 500

20 August 2016 Friendly	Espanyol	0–1	Valencia	Dani Jarque, Sant Adrià de Besòs
		Report	Vilas 50'	Attendance: 200

27 August 2016 Friendly	Valencia	2–0	Levante	Antoni Puchades, Paterna
	Vilas 32'; Férez 64'	Report

=== Primera División ===
==== League table ====
Pos	Team	Pld	W	D	L	GF	GA	GD	Pts	Qualification or relegation
1	Atlético de Madrid (C)	30	24	6	0	91	17	+74	78	Qualification for the UEFA Champions League and Copa de la Reina
2	Barcelona	30	24	3	3	98	13	+85	75	Qualification for the UEFA Champions League and Copa de la Reina
3	Valencia	30	20	8	2	69	11	+58	68	Qualification for the Copa de la Reina
4	Levante	30	18	3	9	53	49	+4	57	Qualification for the Copa de la Reina
5	Athletic Club	30	16	5	9	64	44	+20	53	Qualification for the Copa de la Reina

Source: Futbolme
Rules for classification: 1) points; 2) head-to-head points; 3) goal difference; 4) number of goals scored
(C) Champions

==== Results ====
4 September 2016 1	(1) Valencia	5–0	Zaragoza (16)	Antoni Puchades, Paterna
11:00	Yamamoto 11'; Vilas 46', 64', 75'; Peiró 83'	Report		Attendance: 800; Referee: Querol Yuste

11 September 2016 2	(11) Espanyol	0–2	Valencia (2)	Dani Jarque, Sant Adrià de Besòs
12:45		Report	Vilas 39' (pen.); Szymanowski 46'	Attendance: 300; Referee: Rodríguez Enrique

24 September 2016 3	(2) Valencia	4–0	Albacete (9)	Antoni Puchades, Paterna
10:45	Vilas 13', 37'; Szymanowski 29', 58'	Report		Attendance: 600; Referee: Lax Franco

2 October 2016 4	(7) Sporting Huelva	0–0	Valencia (3)	La Orden, Huelva
12:30		Report		Referee: Conejero Sánchez

9 October 2016 5	(3) Valencia	1–0	Tacuense (13)	Antoni Puchades, Paterna
12:00	Vilas 39'	Report		Attendance: 400; Referee: Lax Franco

12 October 2016 6	(10) Betis	0–0	Valencia (4)	Luis del Sol, Sevilla
13:00		Report		Attendance: 400; Referee: Massat

16 October 2016 7	(3) Valencia	3–1	Athletic Bilbao (5)	Antoni Puchades, Paterna
16:00	Moraza 6' (o.g.); Zornoza 18'; Férez 79'	Report	Corres 25'	Attendance: 600; Referee: Díaz Escudero

30 October 2016 8	(13) Oiartzun	0–1	Valencia (3)	Karla Lekuona, Oiartzun
12:00		Report	Magalhães 77'	Referee: Fuente Martín

6 November 2016 9	(7) Santa Teresa	0–0	Valencia (4)	El Viejo Vivero, Badajoz
12:00		Report		Referee: Francisco Sáez Vital

12 November 2016 10	(4) Valencia	1–1	Atlético Madrid (2)	Antoni Puchades, Paterna
16:00	Vilas 51'	Report	Sampedro 32'	Attendance: 600; Referee: Sánchez

19 November 2016 11	(3) Levante	2–1	Valencia (4)	Ciutat de València, Valencia
16:00	Oprea 19'; Marín 52'	Report	Banini 61'	Attendance: 8,122; Referee: Gallego Gambín

3 December 2016 12	(4) Valencia	2–2	Granadilla (5)	Antoni Puchades, Paterna
12:00	Vilas 8'; Zornoza 35'	Report	Dozono 5'; Peña 62'	Referee: Sauleda Torrent

7 December 2016 13	(1) Barcelona	1–1	Valencia (4)	Mini Estadi, Barcelona
18:00	Alves 3'	Report	Vilas 75'	Referee: Leo Ollo

11 December 2016 14	(4) Valencia	3–0	Real Sociedad (11)	Antoni Puchades, Paterna
12:00	Peiró 79', 82'; Nicart 87'	Report		Referee: Varón Aceitón

8 January 2017 15	(8) Rayo Vallecano	0–1	Valencia (4)	Rayo Vallecano, Madrid
12:35		Report	Vilas 87'	Referee: Ruiperez Marín

15 January 2017 16	(11) Zaragoza	0–4	Valencia (4)	La Romareda, Zaragoza
12:00		Report	Peiró 4'; Vilas 26'; Zornoza 49'; Férez 77'	Attendance: 3,150; Referee: Sáez de Adana Oribe

28 January 2017 17	(4) Valencia	0–0	Espanyol (15)	Antoni Puchades, Paterna
10:45		Report		Attendance: 500; Referee: Sánchez López

12 February 2017 18	(13) Albacete	0–4	Valencia (3)	Andrés Iniesta, Albacete
12:00		Report	Peiró 53'; Vilas 57', 63'; Nicart 87'	Referee: Lax Franco

19 February 2017 19	(3) Valencia	2–0	Sporting Huelva (9)	Antoni Puchades, Paterna
12:00	García 22'; Vilas 80'	Report		Attendance: 350

26 February 2017 20	(16) Tacuense	0–5	Valencia (3)	Pablos Abril, San Cristóbal de la Laguna
12:00		Report	Aedo 22', 68'; Vilas 26', 71'; Peiró 81'	Referee: Sánchez Aparicio

12 March 2017 21	(3) Valencia	5–0	Betis (11)	Antoni Puchades, Paterna
12:00	Vilas 34', 75'; Férez 42'; Banini 61', 70'	Report		Attendance: 650; Referee: Barceló Roca

19 March 2017 22	(5) Athletic Bilbao	1–2	Valencia (3)	Facilities, Lezama
16:00	G. Murua 67'	Report	Vilas 84', 87'	Referee: López Parra

26 March 2017 23	(3) Valencia	3–0	Oiartzun (13)	Antoni Puchades, Paterna
11:30	Vilas 41', 44'; Aedo 56'	Report		Attendance: 500; Referee: Catalá Ferrán

1 April 2017 24	(3) Valencia	2–0	Santa Teresa (9)	Antoni Puchades, Paterna
16:00	Aedo 37'; Zornoza 71'	Report		Attendance: 600; Referee: Fernández Pérez

15 April 2017 25	(2) Atlético Madrid	0–0	Valencia (3)	Cerro del Espino, Majadahonda
14:30		Report		Referee: González González

23 April 2017 26	(3) Valencia	6–0	Levante (4)	Mestalla, Valencia
12:00	Aedo 8', 18'; Férez 23'; Vilas 35'; Banini 57'; Peiró 76'	Report		Attendance: 17,000; Referee: Nieva López

30 April 2017 27	(6) Granadilla	1–3	Valencia (3)	La Hoya del Pozo, El Médano
13:00	Spindler 79'	Report	Magalhães 32'; Aedo 37'; Vilas 44'	Referee: Ruiz Aguilera

6 May 2017 28	(3) Valencia	0–1	Barcelona (1)	Antoni Puchades, Paterna
16:00		Report	Unzué 58'	Attendance: 1,400; Referee: Collado López

14 May 2017 29	(8) Real Sociedad	0–4	Valencia (3)	Zubieta, Usurbil
16:15		Report	Vilas 53'; Gaitán 75'; Peiró 85'; Carrión 90+2'	Referee: Sánchez Alba

21 May 2017 30	(3) Valencia	4–1	Rayo Vallecano (7)	Antoni Puchades, Paterna
12:00	Vilas 5', 75'; Nicart 31'; García 57'	Report	Pablos 17'	Attendance: 400; Referee: Martínez Montalbán

=== Copa de la Reina ===
3 June 2017 Quarterfinals	Athletic Bilbao	1–3	Valencia	Matapiñonera, S. Sebastián de los Reyes
12:30	Corres 10'	Report	Banini 9'; Vilas 55', 66'	Referee: Huerta de Aza

16 June 2017 Semifinals	Barcelona	2–1	Valencia	Ciudad del Fútbol, Las Rozas de Madrid
17:00	Gili 20'; Losada 27'	Report	Vilas 90+4'	Referee: Ortiz Arias

== Primera División statistics ==
No.	Pos.	FIFA		Player	Games		Goals	Disciplinary record		
No.	Pos.	Nationality	FC	Player	Pl.	St.	Goals	Booked	(yellow card) (yellow-red card)	Sent off (straight red)
1	GK	Spain		Esther Sullastres	7	7	0	1	0	0
3	DF	Spain	2015	Paula Nicart	29	29	3	7	0	0
4	DF	Spain		Salomé Navalón	14	2	0	0	0	0
5	DF	Spain	2015	Ivana Andrés	30	30	0	2	0	0
6	MF	Spain		Esther Romero	17	8	0	1	0	0
7	MF	Brazil		Joyce Mahalhães	30	30	2	2	0	0
8	MF	Spain		Ángeles Carrión	2	0	1	0	0	0
9	FW	Chile	2010	Yanara Aedo	25	15	7	0	0	0
10	FW	Spain	2008	Mari Paz Vilas	27	26	28	1	0	0
11	FW	Argentina	2014	Marianela Szymanowski	27	10	3	1	0	0
13	GK	Chile	2009	Christiane Endler	23	23	0	1	0	0
14	FW	Spain	2015	Carol Férez	30	25	4	1	0	0
17	MF	Spain	2012	Débora García	27	22	2	0	0	0
18	DF	Colombia	2011	Natalia Gaitán	30	30	1	1	0	0
19	MF	Argentina	2010	Estefanía Banini	21	19	4	4	0	0
20	MF	Spain		Gio Carreras	16	11	0	0	0	0
21	MF	Spain	2016	Claudia Zornoza	30	30	4	1	0	0
22	MF	Japan		Maya Yamamoto	16	3	1	0	0	0
23	FW	Spain		Marta Peiró	23	4	8	0	0	0
24	DF	Spain		Sara Micó	3	1	0	0	0	0
26	DF	Spain		Cintia Montagut	7	3	0	0	0	0
27	DF	Spain		Neus Llinares	2	0	0	0	0	0
28	MF	Spain		Claudia Florentino	6	1	0	0	0	0
29	MF	Spain		Paula Sancho	4	0	0	0	0	0
30	MF	Spain		Sara Medina	3	1	0	0	0	0
