= 2022–23 Copa de la Reina de Fútbol =

2022–2023 Copa de la Reina de Fútbol
Campeonato de España Copa de Su Majestad la Reina

Tournament details
- Country: Spain
- Teams: 48

Final positions
- Champions: Atlético de Madrid (2nd title)
- Runners-up: Real Madrid

Tournament statistics
- Matches played: 44
- Goals scored: 132 (3 per match)
- Top goal scorer(s): Millene Cabral; Alicia Martínez; Jade; Mara Jiménez; Isina (3)

The 2022–23 Copa de la Reina de Fútbol was the 41st edition of the Spanish women's association football national cup organized by the Royal Spanish Football Federation (RFEF). Barcelona were the defending champions, having won the last three editions.

== Schedule and format ==
All ties are played in a single-match decider at a home ground. All matches ending in a tie will be decided in extra time; and if it persists, by a penalty shootout.

Round	Draw date	Match date	Fixtures	Clubs	Format details
First round	7 September 2022	13–15, 27–28 September 2022	16	32 → 16	Knock-out tournament type: Single match.
Second round	4 October 2022	18–20 October 2022	8	16 → 8	Knock-out tournament type: Single match.
Third round	21 October 2022	22–23 November 2022	8	16 → 8	Knock-out tournament type: Single match.
Round of 16	25 November 2022	10-11-12 January 2023	8	16 → 8	Knock-out tournament type: Single match.
Quarter-final	3 February 2023	7-8-9 March 2023	4	8 → 4	Knock-out tournament type: Single match.
Semi-final	25 April 2023	23-24 May 2023	2	4 → 2	Knock-out tournament type: Single match.
Final	25 April 2023	27 May 2023	1	2 → 1	Single match

== First round ==
=== Draw ===
The draw was completed by the RFEF on 7 September 2022, at the Ciudad del Fútbol de Las Rozas in Madrid.

=== Matches ===
13 September 2022	Sporting Gijón	0–1	Córdoba	Gijón
17:00 CEST (UTC+2)		Report	Elisa Tomé 68'	Stadium: Escuela de Fútbol de Mareo; Referee: Andrea Fírvida Fernández

13 September 2022	Osasuna	1–0	AEM Lleida	Aranguren
18:30 CEST (UTC+2)	Iara 48'	Report		Stadium: Tajonar Facilities; Attendance: 210; Referee: Patricia Cosma Haiduc

13 September 2022	Pradejón	1–3	Espanyol	Pradejón
19:00 CEST (UTC+2)	Laura Pérez 25'	Report	Natalia 11'; Talom 34' (o.g.); Luzu 67'	Stadium: Campo Municipal Pradejón; Referee: Lorena Trujillano Gallardo

13 September 2022	Racing Santander	2–2 (a.e.t.) (4–5 p)	Cacereño	Torrelavega
19:30 CEST (UTC+2)	Mery 37'; Carla 93'	Report	Tania 43'; Manoly 98'	Stadium: Campo Santa Ana; Referee: Selina Alvarez Blanco
	Penalties
	Penalty scored Penalty missed		Penalty missed Penalty scored

13 September 2022	Unión Viera	0–2	Dux Logroño	Las Palmas
20:00 CEST (UTC+2)		Report	Anita 4', 45' (pen.)	Stadium: Estadio Alfonso Silva; Referee: Josefa Sánchez Gómez

14 September 2022	Deportivo La Coruña	5–0	Parquesol	Abegondo
16:30 CEST (UTC+2)	Millene 19', 44', 77'; Eva Dios 82'; Paula Novo 90+2'	Report		Stadium: Cidade Deportiva de Abegondo; Attendance: 300; Referee: Andrea López Méndez

14 September 2022	Peluquería Mixta Friol	6–0	Pozoalbense	Friol
17:30 CEST (UTC+2)	Alicia 10', 12', 89'; Mabel 37', 53'; Nerea 48'	Report		Stadium: Municipal de A Reigosa; Referee: Alberto Lago Barreiro

14 September 2022	Elche	3–0; Walkover	Santa Teresa	Elche
17:30 CEST (UTC+2)		Report		Stadium: Campo Emilio Esteban; Referee: Raquel Ortiz García
Note: Elche awarded tie due to Santa Teresa failing to play the match, due to not arriving at the match.

14 September 2022	Tenerife	5–1	Castellón	Santa Cruz de Tenerife
18:00 CEST (UTC+2)	Mara 10', 54'; Xisela 34'; Ara 49', 56'	Report	Aida 60'	Stadium: Ciudad Deportiva Javier Pérez; Referee: Johan González Rodríguez

14 September 2022	Albacete	4–0	Seagull	Albacete
19:00 CEST (UTC+2)	Gómez 31', 36'; Bautista 39'; Martínez 88'	Report		Stadium: Ciudad Deportiva Andrés Iniesta; Referee: Claudia Cebollada Lopez

14 September 2022	Europa	3–0	Zaragoza	Barcelona
19:15 CEST (UTC+2)	Bové 27'; Pili Porta 63'; Farreras 89'	Report		Stadium: Nou Sardenya; Referee: Sandra González Jiménez

14 September 2022	Femarguín	0–1	Juan Grande	Mogán
20:00 CEST (UTC+2)		Report	Leti 90+3'	Stadium: Municipal de Mogán; Referee: Paula Porcuna Sánchez

14 September 2022	Málaga	0–1	Granada	Rincón de la Victoria
20:30 CEST (UTC+2)		Report	Ramos 77'	Stadium: Francisco Romero; Referee: Nuria Sanchez Garcia

15 September 2022	La Solana	0–2	Real Oviedo	La Solana
20:00 CEST (UTC+2)		Report	Isina 52', 74'	Stadium: La Moheda; Referee: Cristina Aguilera Manzano

27 September 2022	Real Unión Tenerife	0–4	Levante Las Planas	Santa Úrsula
16:00 CEST (UTC+2)		Report	Muth 15', 74'; Garrote 42'; Carter 78'	Stadium: Estadio Argelio Tabares; Referee: Olatz Rivera Olmedo
Note: Originally scheduled for 13 September 2022 at 20:00.

28 September 2022	Bizkerre	0–5	Alhama	Getxo
19:00 CEST (UTC+2)		Report	Carid 9'; Coronel 42'; Jade 46', 52', 65' (pen.)	Stadium: Fadura; Referee: Ylenia Sánchez Miguel
Note: Originally scheduled for 14 September 2022 at 19:00.

== Second round ==
=== Draw ===
The draw was completed by the RFEF on 4 October 2022, at the Ciudad del Fútbol de Las Rozas in Madrid.

=== Matches ===
18 October 2022	Levante Las Planas	0–1	Granada	Sant Joan Despí
16:30 CEST (UTC+2)		Report	Naima 74'	Stadium: Municipal de Les Planes; Referee: Raquel Suárez González

19 October 2022	Córdoba	2–1	Dux Logroño	Córdoba
17:00 CEST (UTC+2)	María B. 65', 78'	Report	Bassira 47'	Stadium: Ciudad Deportiva; Referee: Nuria Sanchez Garcia

19 October 2022	Tenerife	0–0 (a.e.t.) (5–4 p)	Deportivo La Coruña	Santa Cruz de Tenerife
18:00 CEST (UTC+2)		Report		Stadium: Ciudad Deportiva Javier Pérez; Referee: Cecilia Laura Muñoz Di Giovambattista
	Penalties
	Penalty scored		Penalty scored Penalty missed

19 October 2022	Espanyol	2–0	Cacereño	Sant Adrià de Besòs
18:30 CEST (UTC+2)	A. Martín 24'; Nuria M. 84'	Report		Stadium: Ciutat Esportiva Dani Jarque; Referee: Ágata López García

19 October 2022	Europa	1–3	Real Oviedo	Barcelona
20:00 CEST (UTC+2)	Bové 47'	Report	M. Ortíz 15'; Isina 60'; Kimberlyn 74'	Stadium: Nou Sardenya; Referee: Andrea Fírvida Fernández

19 October 2022	Juan Grande	1–1 (a.e.t.) (0–3 p)	Osasuna	Las Palmas
20:00 CEST (UTC+2)	Cora 18'	Report	Arantxa 8'	Stadium: Campo de Fútbol de Juan Grande; Referee: Claudia Cebollada Lopez
	Penalties
	Penalty missed		Penalty scored

20 October 2022	Elche	1–5	Alhama	Elche
17:00 CEST (UTC+2)	Inés 26'	Report	Martí 1'; Daniela 15'; Andrea Carid 21'; Helena 63'; Raquel 76'	Stadium: Campo Emilio Esteban; Referee: Amy Peñalver Pearce

20 October 2022	Peluquería Mixta Friol	0–1	Albacete	Friol
17:30 CEST (UTC+2)		Report	Bautista 60'	Stadium: Municipal de A Reigosa; Referee: Paula Porcuna Sánchez

== Third round ==
=== Draw ===
The draw was completed by the RFEF on 21 October 2022, at the Ciudad del Fútbol de Las Rozas in Madrid.

=== Matches ===
22 November 2022	Espanyol	1–2 (a.e.t.)	Villarreal	Sant Adrià de Besòs
17:00	Pixu 68'		Sánchez 75'; Martínez 115'	Stadium: Ciutat Esportiva Dani Jarque

22 November 2022	Tenerife	2–1	Eibar	Santa Cruz de Tenerife
19:30 WET	Mara 15'; Gasienica 54'		Sánchez 59' (pen.)	Stadium: Ciudad Deportiva Javier Pérez

22 November 2022	Granada	3–1	Real Betis	Granada
19:30	Requena 25'; Salas 49'; Naima 90+1'		Rinsola Babajide 76'	Stadium: Miguel Prieto

23 November 2022	Osasuna	2–0	Sporting de Huelva	Aranguren
18:00	Lacosta 67'; Torras 81'			Stadium: Tajonar Facilities

23 November 2022	Albacete	1–0	Rayo Vallecano	Albacete
18:30	Zafra Carmona 14'			Stadium: Ciudad Deportiva Andrés Iniesta

23 November 2022	Córdoba	0–4	Madrid CFF	Córdoba
19:30		Report	Kundananji 5', 55'; Gabi Nunes 75'; Pardo 90+2'	Stadium: Ciudad Deportiva

23 November 2022	Alhama	1–0	Valencia	Alhama de Murcia
20:00	Morcillo 65'			Stadium: Deportivo del Guadalentín

23 November 2022	Real Oviedo	1–1 (a.e.t.) (0–3 p)	Alavés	Oviedo
20:00	Moro Begega 37'		Miriam 45+1'	Stadium: Díaz Vega
	Penalties
	Isina (penalty missed); Jouanín (penalty missed); Walsh (penalty missed)		(penalty scored) Miriam; (penalty scored) Sanadri; (penalty scored) Soliveres

== Round of 16 ==
=== Draw ===
The draw was completed by the RFEF on 25 November 2022, at the Ciudad del Fútbol de Las Rozas in Madrid.

=== Matches ===
Barcelona and Sevilla won their matches but then were both disqualified.

10 January 2023	Villarreal	Void	Sevilla	Villarreal
18:45		originally 0–1		Stadium: Ciudad Deportiva
Note: Sevilla eliminated for fielding an ineligible player.

10 January 2023	Granada	1–0	Alavés	Granada
18:45	Larque 85' (o.g.)			Stadium: Miguel Prieto

10 January 2023	Osasuna	Void	Barcelona	Pamplona
20:45		originally 0–9		Stadium: El Sadar
Note: Barcelona eliminated for fielding an ineligible player.

11 January 2023	Real Sociedad	0–2	Atlético de Madrid	San Sebastián
18:30			Cardona 45'; Ajibade 60'	Stadium: Zubieta

11 January 2023	Alhama	5–3 (a.e.t.)	Levante	Alhama de Murcia
20:30	Pinel 11', 36'; Kuki 67'; Caravaca 120+1'; Martí 120+6'		Ramírez 31'; Mendoza 52'; Redondo 57'	Stadium: Deportivo del Guadalentín

11 January 2023	Tenerife	0–4	Granadilla	Santa Cruz de Tenerife
21:00 WET			Pisco 5' (pen.); Maria José 34'; Monday 39'; Lusello 73' (pen.)	Stadium: Ciudad Deportiva Javier Pérez

12 January 2023	Albacete	0–6	Real Madrid	Albacete
18:00			García 32'; Gálvez 45', 78'; Herrero Muñoz 64' (o.g.); Zornoza 82'; Partido 86'	Stadium: Ciudad Deportiva Andrés Iniesta

12 January 2023	Madrid CFF	0–1	Athletic Club	San Sebastián de los Reyes
20:00			Pinedo 15'	Stadium: Matapiñoneras

== Quarter-final ==
=== Draw ===
The draw was completed by the RFEF on 3 February 2023, at the Ciudad del Fútbol de Las Rozas in Madrid.

Barcelona and Sevilla were eliminated for improper alignment.

=== Matches ===
7 March 2023	Alhama	1–0	Granadilla	Alhama de Murcia
17:30	Quintero 20'			Stadium: Deportivo del Guadalentín

8 March 2023	Granada	0–3	Atlético de Madrid	Granada
21:00			Latorre 45+1'; García 75' van Dongen 87'	Stadium: Los Cármenes; Attendance: 6,135

9 March 2023	Osasuna	1–2	Athletic Club	Aranguren
18:30	Sobrón 67'		Azkona 11'; Peke 64'	Stadium: Tajonar Facilities

9 March 2023	Villarreal	1–2 (a.e.t.)	Real Madrid	Villarreal
21:00	Ivana 77' (o.g.)		González 34'; Caicedo 100'	Stadium: Ciudad Deportiva

== Semi-final ==
=== Draw ===
The draw was completed by the RFEF on 25 April 2023, at the Ciudad del Fútbol de Las Rozas in Madrid.

Qualified team

Alhama
Athletic Club
Atlético de Madrid
Real Madrid

=== Matches ===
23 May 2023	Alhama	0–4	Atlético de Madrid	Leganés
21:00			Majarín 5'; Banini 37'; Eva Navarro 57'; Lundkvist 74'	Stadium: Estadio Municipal de Butarque

24 May 2023	Athletic Club	0–4	Real Madrid	Leganés
21:00		Report	Weir 7' 46'; Toletti 26'; Athenea 40'	Stadium: Estadio Municipal de Butarque

== Final ==
27 May 2023
22:00

Atlético de Madrid	2–2 (a.e.t.)	Real Madrid
Moral 88'; Banini 90+5'; Lundkvist (yellow card) 111'; Alexia (yellow card) 114'	ESPN report Real Madrid report Atlético report	Toletti 31'; Kathellen (yellow card) 34'; Ivana 56'; Oroz (yellow card) 90+3'
Penalties
Menayo (penalty scored); Guerrero (penalty scored); Eva Navarro (penalty scored); Banini (penalty missed)	3–1	(penalty scored) Weir; (penalty missed) Carmona; (penalty missed) Teresa; (penalty missed) Svava

Estadio Municipal de Butarque, Leganés
Attendance: 9,217
Referee: Ainara Andrea Acevedo Dudley

== Top goalscorers ==
As of 27 May 2023

Rank	Player	Club	Goals
1	(Brazil) Millene Cabral	Deportivo La Coruña	3
1	(Spain) Alicia Martínez	Peluquería Mixta Friol	3
1	(Equatorial Guinea) Jade	Alhama	3
1	(Spain) Mara Jiménez	Tenerife	3
1	(Spain) Isina	Oviedo	3
