= COTIF Women's Football Tournament =

Spanish annual women's football tournament

The COTIF Women's Football Tournament is a Spanish annual women's football summer tournament held in L'Alcúdia, Valencia. First held in 2012, it is the women's football section of the L'Alcúdia International Football Tournament.

Unlike the male tournament, which is played by U-20 clubs and national teams, the women's tournament is contested by senior teams. It has gradually progressed from local to international in scope.

== 2011 ==
Held on 12 August. It was a single match confronting the two Valencian teams in the top national championship, Levante UD and Valencia CF. Levante won the first of three trophies in a row.

| 12 August 2011 Final | Levante | 2–0 | Valencia | Els Arcs, L'Alcúdia |
| | García pen.' Merino | Report |

== 2012 ==
Held from 16 to 22 August. Levante UD and Valencia CF were joined by two local teams from the second tier's Group 7, CFF Marítim and Mislata CF. The two top teams in a round robin first stage qualified for the final, with Levante again defeating Valencia by the same score.

| 16 August 2012 Round robin – 1 | Valencia | 3–0 | Mislata | Els Arcs, L'Alcúdia |
| | Martínez 20', 34'; Ves 28' | Report | | Attendance: 100; Referee: Ruiz García |

| 17 August 2012 Round robin – 1 | Levante | 5–0 | Marítim | Els Arcs, L'Alcúdia |
| | Esteban 3', 11', 60'; Merino 34'; Guijarro 68' | Report |

| 18 August 2012 Round robin – 2 | Valencia | 2–0 | Marítim | Els Arcs, L'Alcúdia |
| | Pinel 45'; Mateos 54' |

| 19 August 2012 Round robin – 2 | Levante | 6–0 | Mislata | Els Arcs, L'Alcúdia |
| | N. Pérez 1'; Casado 31', 37'; Pérez 38'; Guijarro 54'; González 68' |

| 20 August 2012 Round robin – 3 | Marítim | 1–0 | Mislata | Els Arcs, L'Alcúdia |
| | Ferrer 27' | Report |

| 21 August 2012 Round robin – 3 | Levante | 2–2 | Levante | Els Arcs, L'Alcúdia |
| | N. Pérez 48'; Miret 62' | Report | Paredes 10'; Pinel 51' |

Final standings
| Pos | Team | Pld | W | D | L | GF | GA | GD | Pts |
|---|---|---|---|---|---|---|---|---|---|
| 1 | Levante | 3 | 2 | 1 | 0 | 13 | 2 | +11 | 7 |
| 2 | Valencia | 3 | 2 | 1 | 0 | 7 | 2 | +5 | 7 |
| 3 | Marítim | 3 | 1 | 0 | 2 | 1 | 7 | −6 | 3 |
| 4 | Mislata | 3 | 0 | 0 | 3 | 0 | 10 | −10 | 0 |

| 22 August 2012 Final | Levante | 2–0 | Valencia | Els Arcs, L'Alcúdia |
| | Motoso 25'; González 30' | Report | | Referee: Márquez Gordo |

Awards
| | Player | Team |
|---|---|---|
| Best player | (Spain) Alharilla Casado | Levante |
| Top scorer | (Spain) Raquel Pinel | Valencia |

== 2013 ==
Held from 16 to 20 August. It was again contested by Primera División's Levante UD and Valencia CF and two clubs from the second category, but in a final four format. For the first time it featured a team from outside the Valencian Community, Fundación Albacete. Levante won again the trophy on penalties.

| 16 August 2013 Semifinals | Levante | 2–0 | Villarreal | Els Arcs, L'Alcúdia |
| | García 1', 68' (pen.) | Report | | Referee: Felguera |

| 17 August 2013 Semifinals | Valencia | 3–0 | Albacete | Els Arcs, L'Alcúdia |
| | Mateos 5'; Vilas 44'; Peiró 53' | Report | | Referee: Sánchez |

| 20 August 2013 Third place | Villarreal | 3–4 | Albacete | Els Arcs, L'Alcúdia |
| | Monfort 35'; Traver 39'; Navarro 53' | Report | Martínez 22'; Redondo 43'; Lorca 60'; Martí 68' | Attendance: 2,000; Referee: Andújar Raya |

| 20 August 2013 Final | (won on penalties) Levante | 1–1 | Valencia | Els Arcs, L'Alcúdia |
| | Méndez 62' | Report | Martí 60' | Referee: Felguera |

Awards
| | Player | Team |
|---|---|---|
| Best player | (Japan) Mitsue Iwakura | Valencia |
| Top scorer | (Spain) Olga García | Levante |

== 2014 ==
Held from 17 to 19 September. It was the first edition to include a Primera División from outside Valencia (2013-14 champion FC Barcelona), as well as a foreign team (Montpellier HSC, 4th in the 2013-14 French league).

Barcelona won the final with a single goal by Jennifer Hermoso.

Semifinals
(Spain) Levante UD | 1
(France) Montpellier HSC | 0
(Spain) Valencia CF | 0
(Spain) FC Barcelona | 3

Final
(Spain) Levante UD | 0
(Spain) FC Barcelona | 1
3rd place
(France) Montpellier HSC | 2
(Spain) Valencia CF | 1

| MVP | (Cameroon) Zouga (Montpellier) |

| Scorers | Barcelona | Levante | Montpellier | Valencia |
|---|---|---|---|---|
| 1 goal | (Spain) Caldentey (Spain) N. Garrote (Spain) Hermoso (Spain) Putellas | (Spain) Méndez | (France) Tonazzi (Japan) Utsugi | (Spain) Carreras |

== 2015 ==
Held from 15 to 19 August. The tournament is expanded from 4 to 6 teams, and a two groups first stage is introduced. For the first time it features national teams, with Namibia and Venezuela. Ivory Coast's Juventus de Yopougon would have been the first club from another continent but it was replaced by RCD Espanyol.

Athletic Bilbao won the final with a single goal by Elixabet Ibarra.

Group A
| Team | Pld | W | D | L | GF | GA | GD | Pts |
|---|---|---|---|---|---|---|---|---|
| (Spain) Athletic Bilbao | 2 | 2 | 0 | 0 | 3 | 0 | +3 | 6 |
| Namibia | 2 | 1 | 0 | 1 | 2 | 2 | 0 | 3 |
| (Spain) Levante UD | 2 | 0 | 0 | 2 | 1 | 4 | −3 | 0 |

Group B
| Team | Pld | W | D | L | GF | GA | GD | Pts |
|---|---|---|---|---|---|---|---|---|
| (Spain) Valencia CF | 2 | 1 | 1 | 0 | 3 | 1 | +2 | 4 |
| (Spain) RCD Espanyol | 2 | 1 | 1 | 0 | 1 | 0 | +1 | 4 |
| Venezuela | 2 | 0 | 0 | 2 | 1 | 4 | −3 | 0 |

Semifinals
(Spain) Athletic Bilbao | 2
(Spain) RCD Espanyol | 0
(Spain) Valencia CF | 4
Namibia | 0

Final
(Spain) Athletic Bilbao | 1
(Spain) Valencia CF | 0
3rd place
(Spain) RCD Espanyol | 1
Namibia | 0

5th-6th place play-off
| Winner | Res. | Loser |
|---|---|---|
| Levante UD (Spain) | 1–1 (2–0 p) | Venezuela |

| MVP | (Spain) Paredes (Athletic Bilbao) |

| Scorers | Athletic | Valencia | Espanyol | Namibia | Levante | Venezuela |
|---|---|---|---|---|---|---|
| 2 goals | (Spain) Ibarra | (Spain) Gio (Spain) Mari Paz | | | | |
| 1 goal | (Spain) Flaviano (Spain) Gómez (Spain) Nekane (Spain) Paredes | (Spain) Carol (Spain) Monforte (Spain) Romero | (Spain) Lomba (Spain) Paloma | (Namibia) Coleman (Namibia) Juliana | (Spain) Martín (Spain) Palacios | (Venezuela) Gabriela (Venezuela) Yenifer |
