= Montagut =

Montagut may refer to:

- Montagut (clothing), a French clothing company located in Saint-Sauveur-de-Montagut
- Montagut, Pyrénées-Atlantiques, a French commune
- Montagut i Oix, a Spanish municipality located in Garrotxa, Catalonia, Spain
- Escola Montagut, a Spanish college located in Vilafranca del Penedès, Catalonia, Spain
- Berenguer de Montagut, Catalan architect
- Pere de Montagut, Catalan squire
- Peire de Montagut, Grand Master of the Knights Templar from 1218 to 1232
