= Maria Ortiz =

Maria Ortiz may refer to:

- Maria Ortiz (1603–1646), Brazilian heroine, famous for her defense of Espírito Santo
- María Inés Ortiz (1967–2007), U.S. Army nurse
- Paula Ortiz (field hockey) (María Paula Ortiz, born 1997), Argentinian field hockey player
- María Ortiz (footballer), Spanish footballer
