= Cienfu =

Spanish footballer (born 2001)

Personal information
- Full name: María Cienfuegos Baragaño
- Date of birth: 8 April 2001 (age 25)
- Place of birth: Langreo, Spain
- Position: Midfielder

Team information
- Current team: Villarreal
- Number: 6

Senior career*
| Years | Team | Apps | (Gls) |
| 2015–2016 | Real Oviedo B | | |
| 2016–2020 | Real Oviedo | 22+ | |
| 2020–2023 | Villarreal | 38 | (1) |
| 2023–2024 | Sporting de Huelva | | |
| 2024– | Villarreal | | |
- * Club domestic league appearances and goals as of 13:12, 17 April 2022 (UTC)

María Cienfuegos Baragaño (born 8 April 2001), most commonly known as Cienfu, is a Spanish footballer who plays as a midfielder for Villarreal.

== Club career ==
Cienfu started her career at Real Oviedo B.
