= Cristina Cubedo =

Spanish footballer (born 1999)

Personal information
- Full name: Cristina Cubedo Pitarch
- Date of birth: 21 October 1999 (age 27)
- Place of birth: Castellón de la Plana, Spain
- Height: 1.77 m (5 ft 10 in)
- Position: Defender

Team information
- Current team: Villarreal
- Number: 3

Senior career*
Years	Team	Apps	(Gls)
2014–2015	Villarreal B		
2014–2017	Villarreal		
2017–2021	Valencia	71	(5)
2021–2022	Granadilla	24	(0)
2022-	Villarreal	1	(0)
- * Club domestic league appearances and goals as of 13:14, 17 April 2022 (UTC)

Cristina Cubedo Pitarch (born 21 October 1999) is a Spanish footballer who plays as a defender for Villarreal playing in the Primera División.

== Club career ==
Cubedo started her career at Villarreal B.
