= Vera Rico =

Spanish footballer (born 2004)

Personal information
- Full name: Vera Rico Trilles
- Date of birth: 27 June 2004 (age 22)
- Place of birth: Benicàssim, Spain
- Position: Midfielder

Team information
- Current team: Villarreal
- Number: 27

Senior career*
Years	Team	Apps	(Gls)
2019–	Villarreal	9	(0)
- * Club domestic league appearances and goals as of 20:38, 13 December 2021 (UTC)

Vera Rico Trilles (born 27 June 2004) is a Spanish footballer who plays as a midfielder for Villarreal.

== Club career ==
Rico started her professional career at Villarreal. She debuted against Córdoba on 22 February 2020 in the 2019–20 Segunda División season.
