= Irene Miguélez =

Spanish footballer (born 2004)

Personal information
- Full name: Irene Miguélez Martínez
- Date of birth: 5 July 2004 (age 22)
- Place of birth: Castellón de la Plana, Spain
- Position: Defender

Team information
- Current team: Villarreal
- Number: 4

Senior career*
Years	Team	Apps	(Gls)
2019–2021	Villarreal B	16	(0)
2020–	Villarreal	5	(0)

International career
2020	Spain U16	1	(0)
- * Club domestic league appearances and goals as of 12:21, 13 December 2021 (UTC)

Irene Miguélez Martínez (born 5 July 2004) is a Spanish footballer who plays as a defender for Villarreal.

== Club career ==
Miguélez started her career at Villarreal B.
