= Lucía Ramírez =

Spanish footballer (born 1998)

Personal information
- Full name: Lucía Ramírez Ramos
- Date of birth: 2 December 1998 (age 27)
- Place of birth: Morón de la Frontera, Spain
- Height: 1.68 m (5 ft 6 in)
- Position: Defender

Team information
- Current team: Alhama CF

Senior career*
Years	Team	Apps	(Gls)
2013–2015	Sevilla B		
2013–2022	Sevilla	127+	(2+)
2022–	Alhama CF	2	(0)
- * Club domestic league appearances and goals as of 17:05, 1 October 2022 (UTC)

Lucía Ramírez Ramos (born 2 December 1998) is a Spanish footballer who plays as a defender for Alhama CF in the Primera División.

== Club career ==
Ramírez started her career at Sevilla B.
