= Montortal =

Hamlet in L'Alcúdia, Valencia, Spain

Coordinates: 39°10′N 0°31′W

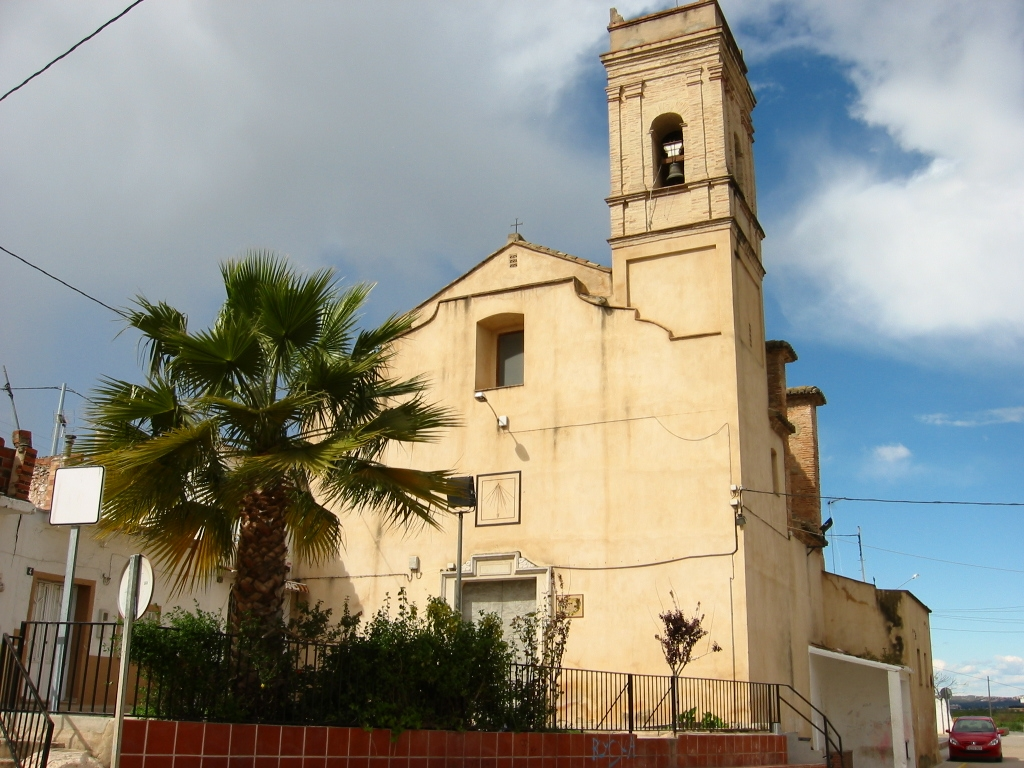
Church in Montortal.

Montortal is a hamlet of l'Alcúdia in the province of Valencia, Spain, with 100 inhabitants.

Sett amongst the orange and caqui groves in an intensive agricultural area, Montortal has a reasonably high Romani population in comparison to most other villages in the area it is well known and respected for its integration between ethnic groups, and is now beginning to experience a resurgence of population and restoration. Situated approximately 25 km from the beaches of the Costa del Azahar, the Valencia bay and 35 km from Valencia.

It is one of the few original villages in the area to remain untouched by developers, mainly because most of the village sits on non urbanizable land causing planning permissions to be either extremely difficult or impossible to obtain.

== History ==
In the late 14th century, Montortal was owned by Gonçalbo de Castellví as a caballería.

Montortal has a church circa 1716, devoted to the Virgin Mary, which has been basically abandoned by the cathedral of San Andrés in l'Alcúdia which took over the church and area in 1902; church services are no longer held in the village. Formerly it was owned by the Marquesses of Montortal.
