= Alexia Jr. =

Spanish footballer (born 2000)

Alexia Jr
Personal information
- Full name: Alexia Melanie Blanco Llacuno
- Date of birth: 14 April 2000 (age 26)
- Place of birth: Valladolid, Spain
- Height: 5 ft 5 in (1.66 m)
- Position: Forward

Team information
- Current team: Villarreal CF
- Number: 21

Youth career
- 2007–2013: CD Parquesol

Senior career*
| Years | Team | Apps | (Gls) |
| 2013–2015 | CD Parquesol B | | |
| 2015–2018 | CD Parquesol | | |
| 2018–2020 | Alavés | | |
| 2020–2022 | SE AEM | | |
| 2022–2024 | Osasuna | | |
| 2024– | Villarreal | | |
- * Club domestic league appearances and goals

Alexia Melanie Blanco Llacuno (born 14 April 2000), also known as Alexia Jr is a professional footballer who plays as a forward for Villarreal CF. Born in Spain, she represents the Philippines at international level.

== Club career ==
Alexia Jr. started her career at CD Parquesol, from Valladolid playing for the B team from 2014 to 2015, before she got promoted to the first team, playing in the Segunda División until 2018.

Alexia Jr. joined another second division team Deportivo Alavés Gloriosas. She helping Alavés earn a promotion to the Primera Federación in the 2018–19 season.

She then played for SE AEM, before joining CA Osasuna in 2022.

In July 2024, Alexia Jr. joined Villarreal CF under a two-year contract. In October 2024, she was rendered unvailable due to a serious injury involving a rupture of the rectus femoris tendon in her quadriceps which required surgery. She eventually recovered by March 2025.

== International career ==
Alexia Jr. was first called up for Philippines in November 2023, for a training camp with the national team in California.

== Personal life ==
Alexia Jr. was born on 14 April 2000 in Valladolid, Spain. She is of Filipino descent through her mother who is from Capiz. Alexia Jr. herself is not a Philippine citizen with a naturalization bill pending in the Philippine Senate since January 2026. She is also a freestyle footballer.
