= Silvia Zarza =

Spanish footballer and padel player

- Born: Silvia Zarza Bris; 30 April 1977 (age 49)
Association football career
- Position: Attacking midfielder
Senior career*
Years	Team	Apps	(Gls)
1990s	Parque Alcobendas CF		
1990s	ADFF Butarque		
1990s	CF Pozuelo		
2001–2003	Levante UD		
2003–2009	ADCF Torrejón		
International career
	Spain	36	
- * Club domestic league appearances and goals
- Tennis career
- Country (sports): Spain

Silvia Zarza Bris (born 30 April 1977) is a Spanish padel player and former football player. As a footballer, she played as an offensive midfielder.

== Career ==
Through the 1990s, she played for Madrilene teams Parque Alcobendas CF, ADFF Butarque and CF Pozuelo. In 2001, she signed for national champion Levante UD, with which she won a Spanish championship and a national cup and played the newly founded UEFA Women's Cup, and two years later she returned to Madrid to play for ADCF Torrejón, where she ended her career in 2009.

She earned 36 caps for the Spain women's national football team, taking part in the 1997 European Championship.
