= Ciudad Deportiva de Buñol =

Training ground of Levante UD

Coordinates: 39°25′49″N 00°46′23″W

Ciutat Esportiva de Bunyol
- Interactive map of Ciutat Esportiva de Bunyol
- Location: Bunyol; Valencian Country
- Owner: Levante UD
- Type: Football training ground

Construction
- Built: 26 June 2003

Tenant
- Levante UD (training) (2003-)

Website
- Ciudad Deportiva de Buñol

The Ciutat Esportiva de Bunyol, is the training ground of the Primera Division club Levante UD. Located in the municipality of Bunyol 40 km west of València, it was opened in 2003.

The construction of the training centre started on 27 September 2002 by the efforts of the club president Antonio Blasco. Almost a year later on 26 June 2003, the Ciutat Esportiva was officially opened.

It occupies an area of 95,000 m^{2}.

== Facilities ==
- The Central Stadium of the Ciudad Deportiva with a capacity of 3,000 seats, is the home stadium of Atlético Levante UD, the reserve team of Levante UD.
- 2 grass pitches.
- 4 artificial pitches.
- 1 indoor sports hall.
- Service centre with gymnasium.
