= Sonia Prim =

Spanish footballer (born 1984)

Personal information
- Full name: Sonia Prim Fernández
- Date of birth: 5 November 1984 (age 41)
- Place of birth: Madrid, Spain
- Height: 1.60 m (5 ft 3 in)
- Position: Right back

Team information
- Current team: Levante
- Number: 4

Youth career
- 1997–1999: CD Lourdes

Senior career*
Years	Team	Apps	(Gls)
1999–2004	Pozuelo		
2004–2010	Levante	132	(12)
2010–2012	Atlético Madrid		
2012–2019	Levante	159	(9)

International career
- Spain U19
- * Club domestic league appearances and goals as of 13 April 2019

Sonia Prim Fernández (born 5 November 1984) is a retired Spanish football defender who was the captain of Primera División club Levante. She previously played for Pozuelo and Atlético Madrid.

== Career ==
Prior to her football career, Prim played futsal. At the age of 15, following two league titles at youth level for Lourdes, Prim signed for Pozuelo. She would spend five seasons at the club. In 2004, she signed for Levante. She won the league title with Levante in 2008. In 2010, Prim was required to spend a year in Ávila due to work commitments. As a result, she left Levante for Atlético Madrid. In April 2019, after 13 seasons at Levante over two spells, Prim announced her retirement. A tribute was held for her in the final game of the season against Atlético Madrid. Both clubs presented her with a football shirt at the end of the match, in honour of her time spent at both clubs.

== Personal life ==
Throughout her football career, Prim worked for the national police force. She also holds a degree in Sports Science.
