= Judith Luzuriaga =

Spanish footballer (born 1999)

Personal information
- Full name: Judith Luzuriaga Albelda
- Date of birth: 17 March 1999 (age 27)
- Place of birth: Nájera, Spain
- Height: 1.68 m (5 ft 6 in)
- Position: Midfielder

Team information
- Current team: Sporting de Huelva
- Number: 7

Senior career*
Years	Team	Apps	(Gls)
2012–2015	CEF Nájera		
2015–2021	Logroño	64+	(4+)
2021–	Sporting de Huelva	17	(1)
- * Club domestic league appearances and goals as of 13:18, 9 December 2021 (UTC)

Judith Luzuriaga Albelda (born 17 March 1999) is a Spanish footballer who plays as a midfielder for Sporting de Huelva.

== Club career ==
Luzuriaga started her career at CEF Nájera.
