= Sara Medina =

Spanish footballer (born 1998)

Personal information
- Full name: Sara Medina Hidalgo
- Date of birth: 8 August 1998 (age 28)
- Place of birth: Torrent, Spain
- Height: 1.68 m (5 ft 6 in)
- Position: Midfielder

Team information
- Current team: Villarreal
- Number: 8

Senior career*
Years	Team	Apps	(Gls)
2013–2019	Valencia B		
2016–2019	Valencia	14	(0)
2019–	Villarreal	55	(11)
- * Club domestic league appearances and goals as of 11:50, 14 December 2021 (UTC)

Sara Medina Hidalgo (born 8 August 1998) is a Spanish footballer who plays as a midfielder for Villarreal.

== Club career ==
Medina started her career at Valencia B.
