= Alhama CF =

Women's football club in Spain

Alhama
- Full name: Alhama Club de Fútbol
- Nickname: Azulonas
- Founded: 2004; 22 years ago
- Stadium: Deportivo del Guadalentín, Alhama de Murcia, Murcia; Estadio Francisco Artés Carrasco (temporally)
- Capacity: 1,500; 8,400 (Francisco Artés Carrasco stadium)
- President: Antonio García-Águila
- Head coach: Randri García
- League: Primera Federación
- 2025–26: Liga F, 15th (relegated)
- Website: alhamaclubdefutbol.com
Home colours	Away colours

Alhama Club de Fútbol, known as Alhama CF ElPozo or Alhama ElPozo for sponsorship reasons and Alhama Females, is a women's association football club base in Alhama de Murcia. Founded in 2004, it currently competes in the Liga F, the Spanish women's football top flight.

== History ==
On 26 January 2022, they defeated Primera División side Eibar in an upset in the Third round of the Copa de la Reina, Spain's national cup. On 11 February 2022, they were drawn to face Real Madrid in the Round of 16.

== Current squad ==
As of

Note: Flags indicate national team as defined under FIFA eligibility rules; some limited exceptions apply. Players may hold more than one non-FIFA nationality.

No.	Pos.	Nation	Player
1	GK	ESP	Laura Martínez
2	DF	ROU	Olivia Oprea
3	DF	ESP	Lena Pérez
4	DF	ESP	Judith Caravaca (captain)
5	DF	ESP	Érica Sastre
7	MF	ESP	Andrea Carid
8	MF	ESP	Daniela Arques
10	FW	ESP	Helena Torres
11	FW	ESP	Kuki Rodríguez
12	MF	ESP	Zaira Flores
13	GK	ESP	Noelia Gil

No.	Pos.	Nation	Player
14	MF	ESP	Nerea Vicente
15	FW	ESP	Raquel Morcillo
17	DF	ESP	Carmen Fresneda
18	MF	PAN	Aldrith Quintero
19	FW	ESP	Marina Martí
20	DF	ESP	Lucía Ramírez
21	MF	ESP	Lucía Martínez
22	MF	ESP	Patri Hidalgo
23	FW	ESP	Raquel Pinel
24	FW	NGR	Charity Adule

== Honours ==
- Segunda División/Primera Federación:
  - Champions: 2021–22 (South), 2024–25
