= Patricia Padilla =

Spanish footballer

Personal information
- Full name: Patricia Padilla Gutiérrez de Rozas
- Date of birth: 18 July 1996 (age 30)
- Place of birth: Santander, Spain
- Height: 1.56 m (5 ft 1 in)
- Position: Defender

Team information
- Current team: Eastern Flames
- Number: 33

Senior career*
Years	Team	Apps	(Gls)
2013–2015	Reocin Racing		
2015–2016	EDF Logroño		
2016–2017	Fundación Albacete	30	(1)
2017–2018	Levante UD	0	(0)
2018–2019	Fundación Albacete	36	(0)
2019–2020	Alavés	10	(0)
2020	Ravenna		
2020–2023	Fundación Albacete	92	(1)
2024–2025	Al-Shabab	2	(0)
2025–	Eastern Flames		
- * Club domestic league appearances and goals as of 5 October 2024

Patricia Padilla Gutiérrez de Rozas (born 18 July 1996), known as Padi, is a Spanish professional footballer who plays as a defender for Saudi Women's Premier League club Eastern Flames.

== Club career ==
In May 2017, she signed a two-year contract with Levante UD. After nine months with the club, she returned to her former team, Fundación Albacete.

On 24 July 2019, She signed for Alavés.

In September 2020, She moved back to Albacete. In July 2022, her contract was renewed for another season, and it was extended once again in July 2023 for an additional year. On 9 August 2024, the club announced the departure of Padi at the end of her third spell with the Manchegan side.

On 6 September 2024, Al-Shabab announced the signing of Padilla.
