= Noelia Ramos =

Spanish footballer (born 1999)

Personal information
- Full name: Noelia Ramos Álvarez
- Date of birth: 10 February 1999 (age 27)
- Place of birth: San Cristóbal de La Laguna, Spain
- Height: 1.68 m (5 ft 6 in)
- Position: Goalkeeper

Team information
- Current team: Tenerife
- Number: 1

Senior career*
| Years | Team | Apps | (Gls) |
| 2013–2017 | Granadilla | 33+ | |
| 2017–2018 | Levante | 24 | (0) |
| 2018–2022 | Sevilla | 60 | (0) |
| 2022– | Tenerife | 11 | (0) |

International career
| 2015–2016 | Spain U17 | | |
| 2017–2018 | Spain U19 | | |
| 2018 | Spain U20 | | |
- * Club domestic league appearances and goals as of 15:07, 14 December 2021 (UTC)

Noelia Ramos Álvarez (born 10 February 1999) is a Spanish footballer who plays as a goalkeeper for Tenerife.

== Club career ==
Ramos started her career at Granadilla.

== Personal life ==
Ramos has a twin sister, Natalia; they played together at Granadilla and Levante before going their separate ways.
