= Marta Carro =

Spanish footballer (born 1991)

Personal information
- Full name: Marta Carro Nolasco
- Date of birth: 6 January 1991 (age 35)
- Place of birth: Cádiz, Spain
- Height: 1.77 m (5 ft 10 in)
- Positions: Centre-back; defensive midfielder

Team information
- Current team: Valencia
- Number: 5

Senior career*
Years	Team	Apps	(Gls)
2007–2016	Atlético Madrid		
2016	AGSM Verona	8	(0)
2017	Madrid CFF		
2017–2025	Valencia CFF	130	(13)
2025–	Olympique de Marseille		

International career
2018–2023	Spain	7	(1)
- * Club domestic league appearances and goals as of 11 February 2023

Marta Carro Nolasco (born 6 January 1991) is a Spanish professional footballer who plays as a midfielder for Olympique de Marseille and the Spain women's national team. She previously played in Liga F club Valencia CF and AGSM Verona in Italy's women's Serie A. and Atlético Madrid.

== Honours ==
=== Clubs ===
Atlético Madrid

- Copa de la Reina de Fútbol: Winner, 2016

=== International ===
Spain

- Cyprus Cup: Winner, 2018
