= Marianela Szymanowski =

Argentine footballer (born 1990)

Personal information
- Date of birth: 31 July 1990 (age 36)
- Place of birth: Buenos Aires, Argentina
- Height: 1.62 m (5 ft 4 in)
- Position: Forward

Team information
- Current team: Villarreal

Senior career*
Years	Team	Apps	(Gls)
2008–2011	Atlético Madrid	38	(7)
2011–2016	Rayo Vallecano	50	(7)
2016–2018	Valencia	54	(10)
2018–2020	Real Betis	44	(4)
2020–2022	Espanyol	31	(7)
2022–2023	Rayo Vallecano	22	(5)
2023–2024	Pomigliano	18	(2)
2024–2025	Standard Liège	1	(0)
2025	Villarreal	7	(0)

International career^{‡}
2014–	Argentina	6	(0)
- * Club domestic league appearances and goals as of 27 April 2025 ‡ National team caps and goals as of 23 February 2023

Marianela Szymanowski (born 31 July 1990) is an Argentine professional footballer who plays as a forward for the Argentina national team.

== Playing career ==
Szymanowski began playing football with the small Madrid suburban club Rayo Ciudad Alcobendas Club de Futbol from age 11 to 18. She then moved to Atlético Madrid, where she debuted in Primera División and in the Champions League with the club. She previously played for Atlético Madrid.

After two years, Szymanowski left Atlético and signed with Rayo Vallecano, where she would play during five seasons before signing with Valencia.

In 2011, she suffered an injury that forced her to provisionally retire until 2013.

On 14 January 2025, Szymanowski joined Villarreal.

== International career ==
Szymanowski played for Argentina in the 2014 Copa América Femenina.

== Personal life ==
Szymanowski's brother Alexander played in La Liga for Leganés. Her paternal grandfather was a Pole born in 1923 in what is now Ukraine, who moved to Buenos Aires, Argentina at the age of five with his family, and later married with a Belarusian woman. Her maternal grandfather's parents were Spanish and her maternal grandmother's parents were Italian. She also holds Spanish citizenship, her full name in that document being Marianela Szymanowski Alonso (Note: In this Spanish name, the first or paternal surname is Szymanowski and the second or maternal family name is Alonso.).
