= Pere de Montagut =

Catalan squire (fl. 1252)

Pere de Montagut was a Catalan squire. In the 13th century, he helped King James I of Aragon to conquer some zones of the kingdom of Valencia from the Moors. As a reward, he was given some territories under the condition that he had to repopulate them with Christian settlers, including L'Alcúdia. Montagut gave his land to 54 settlers in the Carta Pobla document of 17 January 1252.
