= Olivia Oprea =

Romanian footballer (born 1987)

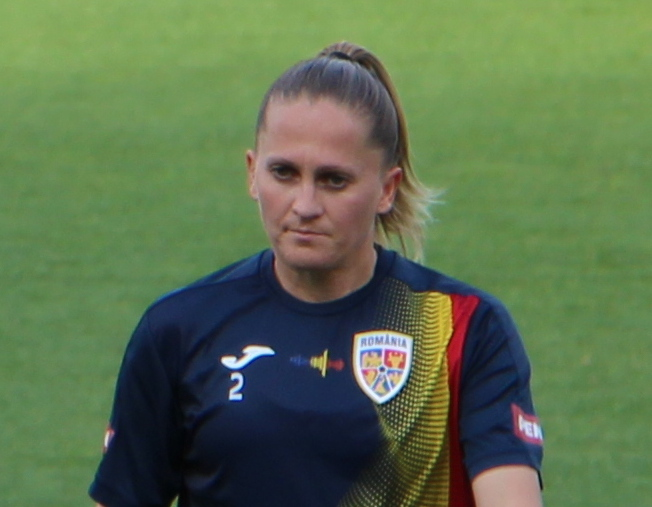

Personal information
- Full name: Olivia Maria Oprea
- Date of birth: 19 March 1987 (age 39)
- Place of birth: Târgoviște, Romania
- Height: 1.64 m (5 ft 5 in)
- Positions: Centre back; defensive midfielder

Team information
- Current team: Alhama
- Number: 2

Senior career*
Years	Team	Apps	(Gls)
2004–2006	CSS Târgovişte		
2005	→ Alma KTZh (loan)		
2007–2009	Sporting Huelva	40	(1)
2009–2010	Amazones Dramas		
2010–2011	Sporting Huelva	25	(1)
2011–2012	Olimpia Cluj		
2012–2013	La Rambla		
2013–2014	Costa Adeje		
2014–2015	Sevilla	27	(0)
2015–2017	Levante	45	(2)
2017–2018	Sevilla	24	(0)
2018–2019	Zaragoza CFF		
2019–2020	Pozoalbense	21	(2)
2020–2022	Villarreal	43	(1)
2022–	Alhama	15	(0)

International career
	Romania	127	
- * Club domestic league appearances and goals as of 2 April 2023

Olivia Maria Oprea (born 19 March 1987), commonly known in Spain as Oli, is a Romanian professional footballer who plays as a centre-back and a defensive midfielder for Spanish Liga F club Alhama and the Romania national team. She has also played in Spain for Sporting Huelva and Sevilla FC, as well as in Greece's A Division for Amazones Dramas, and in the 2005-06 UEFA Women's Cup with Kazakhstan's Alma KTZh. In 2011–2012 she went back to Romania to represent Olimpia Cluj of the Liga I.

She is a member of the Romanian national team.
