= Tomo Matsukawa =

Japanese footballer (born 1993)

Personal information
- Date of birth: 1 November 1993 (age 33)
- Position: Midfielder

Tomo Matsukawa (1 November 1993), is a Japanese footballer who played for Albacete.

== Career ==
In 2016, Tomo Matsukawa signed with Spanish side Albacete after signing with Albacete, Matsukawa scored 4 goals in Liga F, with her most significant goal in a 2–1 victory against UD Tacuense.

In 2019 Tomo Matsukawa transferred to Eibar. At the end of the 2020 season Matsukawa was released by Eibar.
