= Millene Cabral =

Brazilian association football player

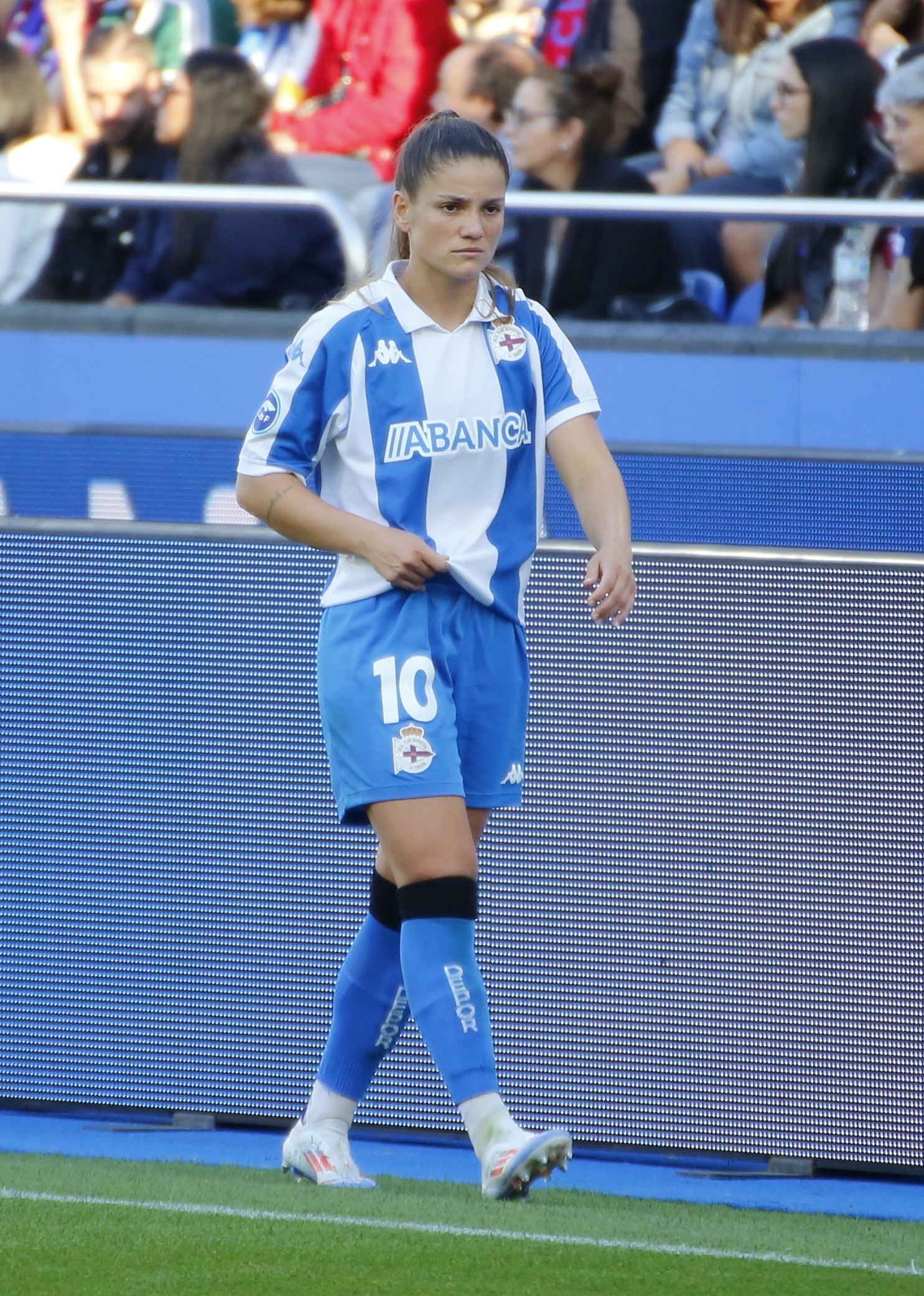

Personal information
- Full name: Millene Cabral Vieira
- Date of birth: 29 November 1997 (age 28)
- Place of birth: Porto Alegre, Brazil
- Position: Forward

Senior career*
Years	Team	Apps	(Gls)
- Rayo Vallecano
2022-	Deportivo		
- * Club domestic league appearances and goals

Millene Cabral Vieira is a Brazilian footballer who plays for Deportivo.
