= Alcalá de la Selva =

Alcalá de la Selva, Spain
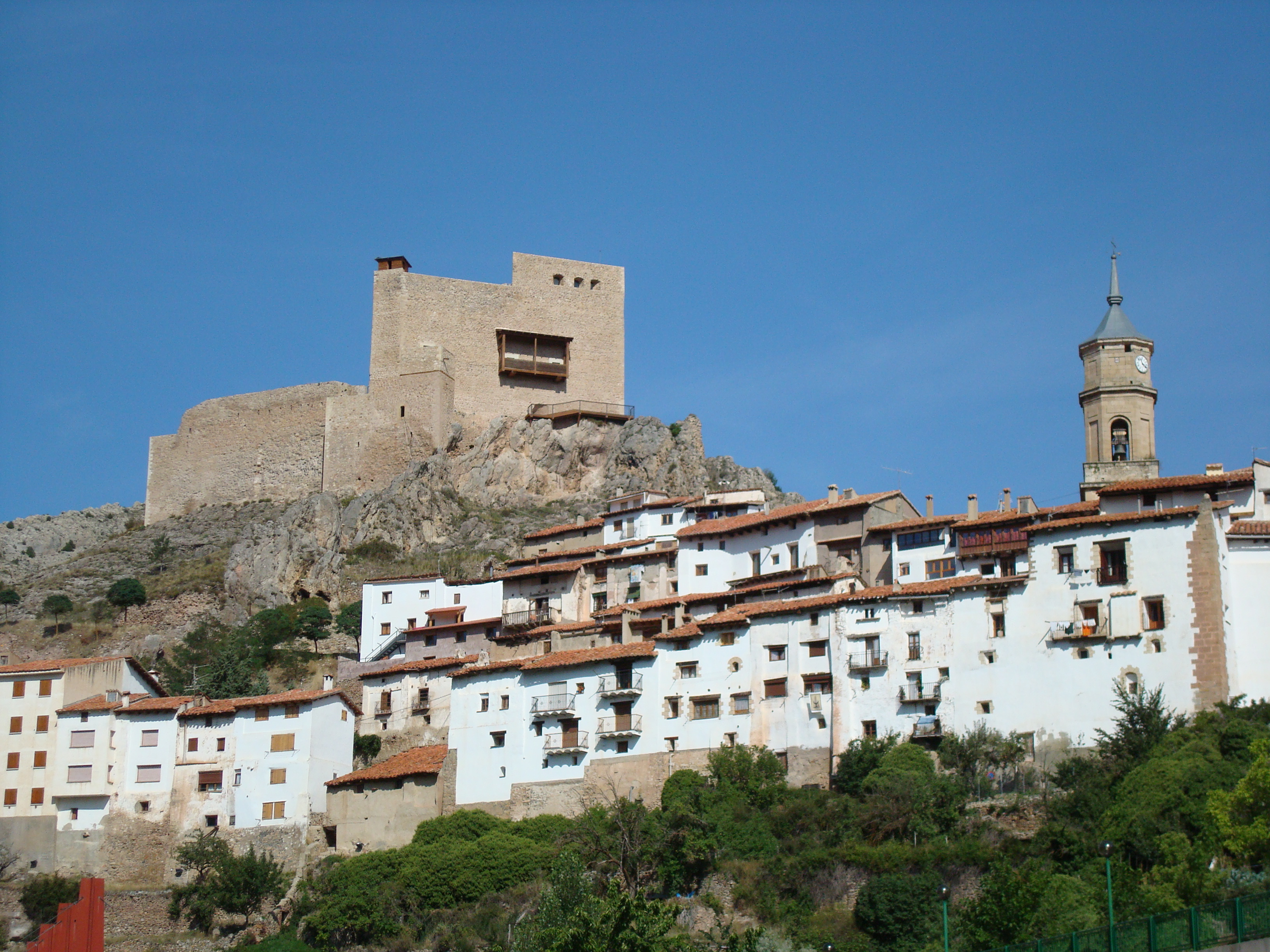

- Coat of arms

- Location within Spain
- Coordinates: 40°22′N 0°42′W
- Country: Spain
- Autonomous community: Aragon
- Province: Teruel
- Municipality: Alcalá de la Selva

Area
  - Total: 104.95 km^{2} (40.52 sq mi)
- Elevation: 1,404 m (4,606 ft)

Population (2025-01-01)
  - Total: 382
  - Density: 3.64/km^{2} (9.43/sq mi)
- Time zone: UTC+1 (CET)
  - Summer (DST): UTC+2 (CEST)

Alcalá de la Selva is a municipality located in the province of Teruel, Aragon, Spain. According to the 2004 census (INE), the municipality has a population of 523 inhabitants.

Formerly a Moorish town known as Al-Qual' at, Alcalá de la Selva was regained by Alfonso II in 1170. Between 1835 and 1840, the town was occupied by the forces of Don Carlos troops during the First Carlist War.

== See also ==
- List of municipalities in Teruel
