= Nerea Pérez =

Spanish footballer (born 1994)

Personal information
- Full name: Nerea Pérez Machado
- Date of birth: 11 January 1994 (age 32)
- Place of birth: Benidorm, Spain
- Height: 1.63 m (5 ft 4 in)
- Position: Midfielder

Team information
- Current team: Villarreal
- Number: 14

Senior career*
Years	Team	Apps	(Gls)
2009–2011	Hércules		
2011–2020	Levante	216	(17)
2020–2021	Santa Teresa	26	(1)
2021–	Villarreal	11	(0)
- * Club domestic league appearances and goals as of 21:49, 12 December 2021 (UTC)

Nerea Pérez Machado (born 11 January 1994) is a Spanish footballer who plays as a midfielder for Villarreal of the Primera División.

== Club career ==
Growing up in Benidorm, Pérez had always desired to be a footballer. After nine years of playing at Levante, she signed for Santa Teresa, who had just gained promotion to the Primera División at that time. She would make 26 league appearances for Santa Teresa in the 2020–21 season. On 2 July 2021, she then transferred to Villarreal to become their first signing of that season.

== International career ==
Pérez represented Spain at under-17 and under-19 level. She played in the team that finished third in the U-17 World Cup and the team that finished second in the 2012 UEFA Championship.
