= Jennifer Morilla =

Spanish footballer (born 1989)

Personal information
- Full name: Jennifer Morilla Bejarano
- Date of birth: 23 January 1989 (age 37)
- Place of birth: Coria del Río, Sevilla, Spain
- Height: 1.75 m (5 ft 9 in)
- Position: Striker

Team information
- Current team: Sporting de Huelva
- Number: 12

Senior career*
Years	Team	Apps	(Gls)
2005–2006	Mairena		
2006–2009	Sporting de Huelva	16	(1)
2009–2011	Sevilla	23	(7)
2011–2013	Sporting de Huelva	51	(10)
2013–2020	Sevilla	114	(30)
2020–	Sporting de Huelva	27	(3)
- * Club domestic league appearances and goals as of 12:31, 25 June 2021 (UTC)

Jennifer Morilla Bejarano (born 23 January 1989), known as Jenni Morilla, is a Spanish footballer who plays as a forward for Primera División club Sporting de Huelva.

== Career ==
Morilla, originally from Coria del Río, started playing football aged 15 for Mairena whilst also practising basketball, tennis and athletics. In her second spell at Sevilla, she stayed with the club throughout a relegation to the Segunda División and promotion back to the Primera División, the highest tier of Spanish women's football. In May 2020, she announced her departure from Sevilla after 10 years at the club in total. That same summer she signed for Sporting de Huelva again.
