= Kuki (footballer, born 1994) =

Spanish footballer

Personal information
- Full name: Míriam Rodríguez González
- Date of birth: 18 November 1994 (age 31)
- Place of birth: Talavera de la Reina, Spain
- Height: 1.60 m (5 ft 3 in)
- Position: Forward

Team information
- Current team: Alhama CF

Senior career*
Years	Team	Apps	(Gls)
2009–2010	Talavera		
2010–2011	Real Valladolid	21	(3)
2011–2012	Rayo Vallecano B		
2012–2014	Atlético Madrid B		
2013–2016	Atlético Madrid	41	(6)
2016–2017	Real Betis	24	(3)
2017–2019	Fundación Albacete	52	(15)
2019–2022	Eibar	60	(14)
2022–	Alhama CF	2	(0)
- * Club domestic league appearances and goals as of 22:55, 1 October 2022 (UTC)

Míriam Rodríguez González (born 18 November 1994), commonly known as Kuki, is a Spanish footballer who plays as a forward for Alhama CF in the Primera División.

== Club career ==
Kuki started her career at Talavera.
