= María Dolores Martínez Madrona =

Spanish female referee

Martínez Madrona
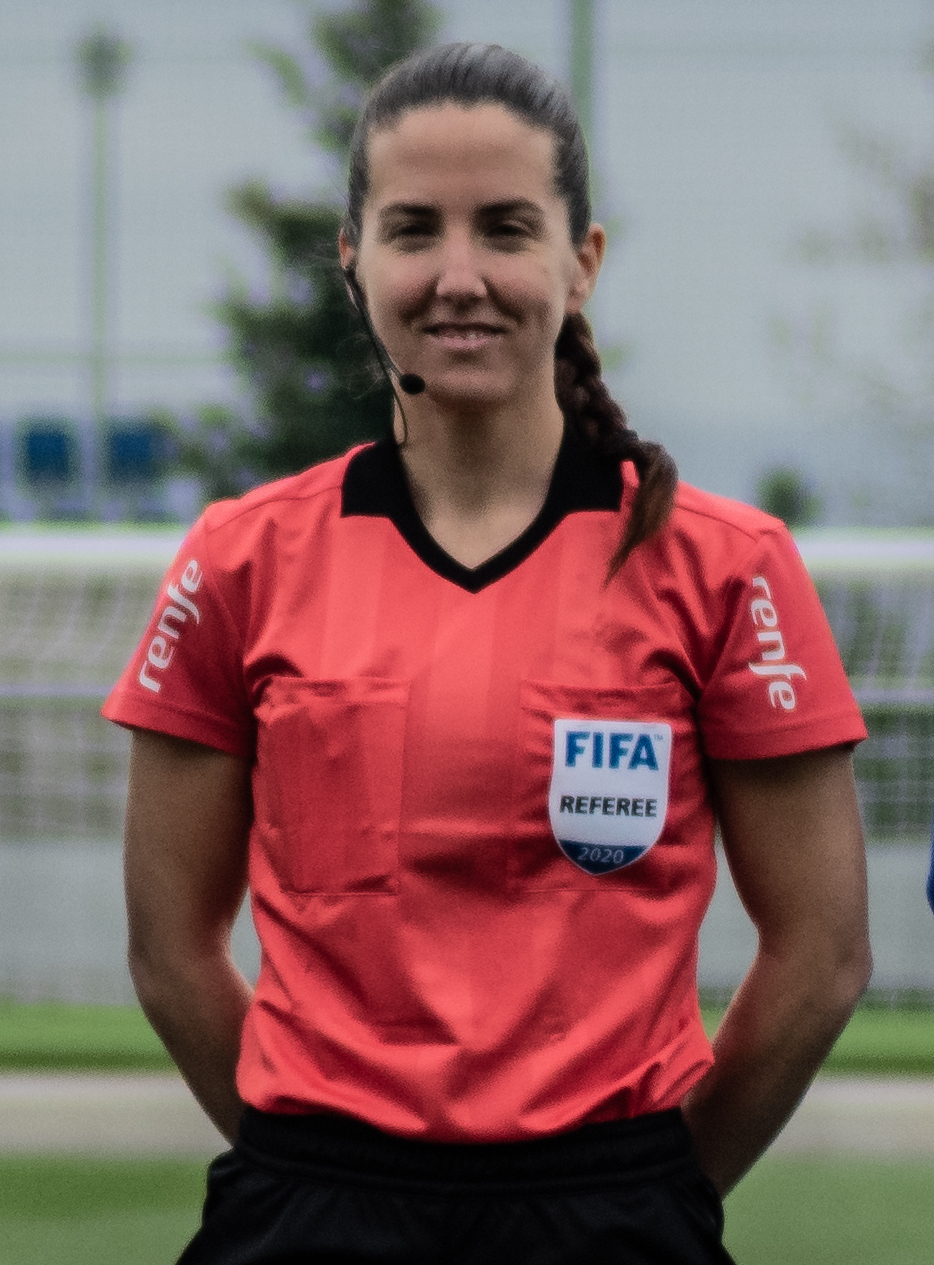
- Full name: María Dolores Martínez Madrona
- Born: May 21, 1986 (age 40); Murcia
- Other occupation: Physical Education Teacher

Domestic
Years	League	
2017-present	Liga F	
Years		Role
2017-present		FIFA

María Dolores Martínez Madrona She is a Spanish soccer referee in the Spanish Women's First Division. She is a member of the Referees Committee of the Region of Murcia.

== Career ==
She were promoted to the top flight of Spanish women's football in 2017, when the league was created to ensure that the Spanish Women's First Division would be refereed solely by female referees.

On May 11, 2019, she officiated the 2018–19 Copa de la Reina de Fútbol final between Atlético de Madrid and Real Sociedad (1-2), played at the Nuevo Estadio de Los Cármenes in Granada.

== Seasons ==
Category	Country	Year
Liga F	Spain	2017-
