= Natalia Ramos =

Spanish footballer (born 1999)

- Ramos with Spain in 2026

Personal information
- Full name: Natalia Ramos Álvarez
- Date of birth: 10 February 1999 (age 27)
- Place of birth: San Cristóbal de La Laguna, Spain
- Height: 1.71 m (5 ft 7 in)
- Position: Defensive midfielder

Team information
- Current team: Liverpool
- Number: 6

Senior career*
Years	Team	Apps	(Gls)
2013–2017	UD Tenerife	42+	(2+)
2017–2018	Levante	21	(3)
2018–2026	UD Tenerife	192	(21)
2026–	Liverpool	4	(0)

International career^{‡}
2026–	Spain	2	(0)
- * Club domestic league appearances and goals as of 16:02, 28 September 2026 (UTC) ‡ National team caps and goals as of 06:56, 15 November 2026 (UTC)

Natalia Ramos Álvarez (born 10 February 1999) is a Spanish professional footballer who plays as a midfielder for Women's Super League club Liverpool and the Spain national team.

== Club career ==
Ramos began her career at UD Tenerife, before spending one season with Levante and returning to UD Tenerife in 2018.

On 6 August 2026, Ramos signed for Women's Super League club Liverpool.

== Personal life ==
Ramos has a twin sister, Noelia; they played together at UD Tenerife and Levante before going their separate ways.

== Career statistics ==
=== Club ===
As of match played 27 September 2026

Appearances and goals by club, season and competition
Club	Season	League			National cup (Note: Includes Copa de la Reina, Women's FA Cup)		League cup (Note: Includes Women's League Cup)		Total	
Club	Season	Division	Apps	Goals	Apps	Goals	Apps	Goals	Apps	Goals
UD Tenerife	2015–16	Primera División	21	1	1	0	—		22	1
UD Tenerife	2016–17	Primera División	21	1	1	0	—		22	1
UD Tenerife	Total		42	2	2	0	0	0	44	2
Levante UD	2017–18	Primera División	21	3	2	0	—		23	3
UD Tenerife	2018–19	Primera División	23	3	1	0	—		24	3
UD Tenerife	2019–20	Primera División	16	1	1	0	—		17	1
UD Tenerife	2020–21	Primera División	33	5	1	0	—		34	5
UD Tenerife	2021–22	Primera División	30	2	3	0	—		33	2
UD Tenerife	2022–23	Liga F	28	0	1	0	—		29	0
UD Tenerife	2023–24	Liga F	23	0	2	0	—		25	0
UD Tenerife	2024–25	Liga F	9	0	0	0	—		9	0
UD Tenerife	2025–26	Liga F	30	10	4	0	—		34	10
UD Tenerife	Total		192	21	13	0	0	0	205	21
Liverpool	2026–27	Women's Super League	4	0	0	0	1	1	5	1
Career total			259	26	17	0	1	1	277	27
