= Buñol =

- Municipality
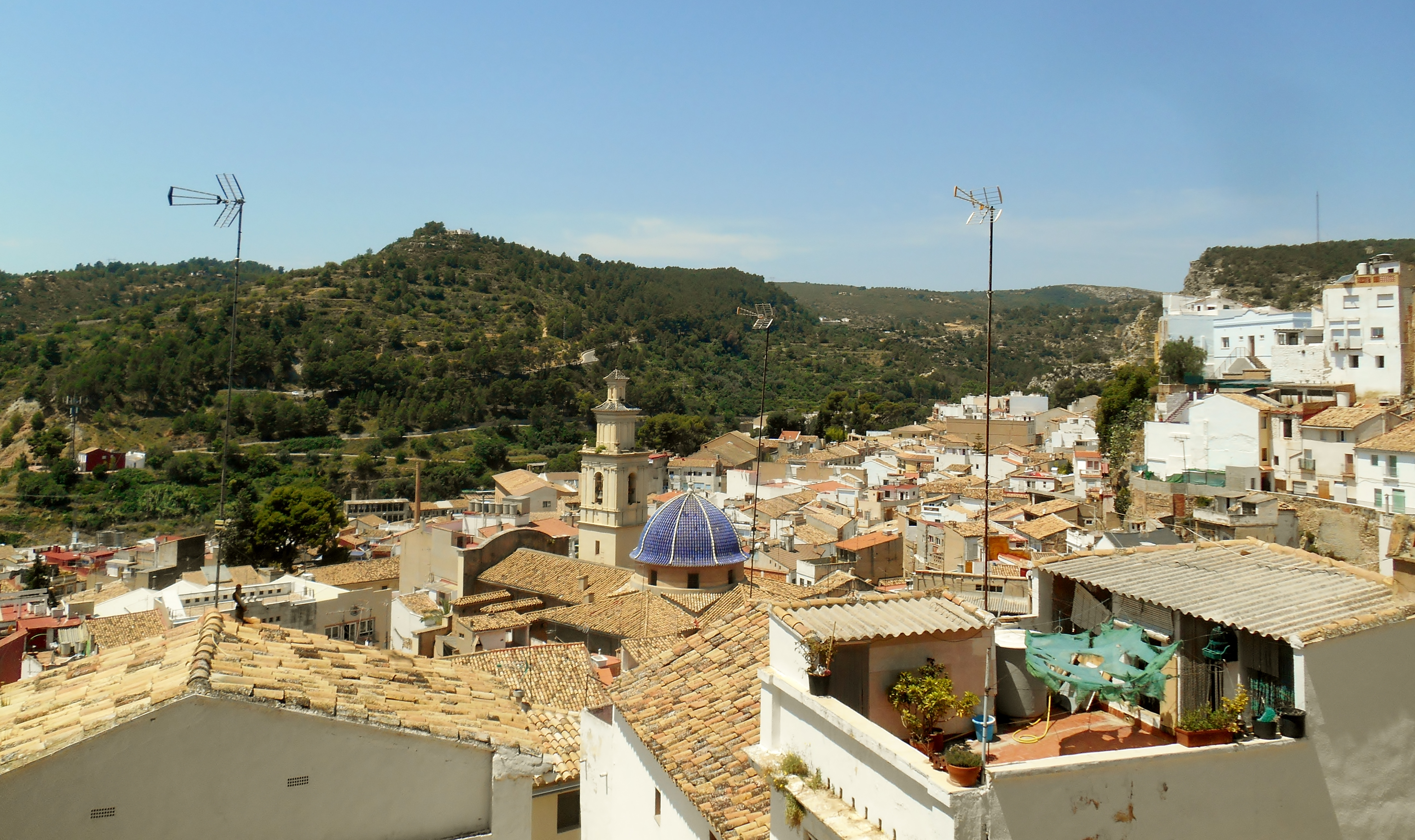
- City of Buñol

- Flag Coat of arms
- Interactive map of Buñol
- Location within Valencian Community Location within Spain
- Coordinates: 39°25′10″N 0°47′26″W
- Country: Spain
- Autonomous community: Valencian Community
- Province: Valencia
- Comarca: Hoya de Buñol
- Judicial district: Chiva

Government
  - Alcalde: Fernando Giraldos (PSPV-PSOE)

Area
  - Total: 112.40 km^{2} (43.40 sq mi)
- Elevation: 441 m (1,447 ft)

Population (2025-01-01)
  - Total: 9,858
  - Density: 87.70/km^{2} (227.2/sq mi)
- Demonym(s): Buñolense; Buñolero/a
- Time zone: UTC+1 (CET)
  - Summer (DST): UTC+2 (CEST)
- Postal code: 46360
- Official language(s): Spanish
- Website: Official website

Buñol (Spanish pronunciation: [buˈɲol]) is a town and municipality in the province of Valencia, Spain. The municipality has an area of some 112 km^{2}, and is situated approximately 38 km west of the provincial and autonomous community capital city, Valencia. It lies along the Buñol River and is surrounded by the mountain ranges La Sierra de Las Cabrillas, la Sierra de Dos Aguas and la Sierra de Malacara y Martés.

The local economic base is a mixture of the industrial and the agricultural (carob trees, almond trees, fruit trees, olive trees and grapes).

Buñol's population is about 9,000.

Buñol has regional rail passenger service to Valencia via the Renfe system.

Every year upwards of 40,000 people gather in the town to throw over 115,000 kilograms of tomatoes at each other in the yearly La Tomatina festival. The festival is a popular sight, and many European tourists visit the town to participate in it.

Near the town are the training grounds and facilities of football club Levante UD.

== See also ==
- List of municipalities in Valencia
