= Naima García =

Spanish footballer (born 1998)

Personal information
- Full name: Naima García Aguilar
- Date of birth: 24 June 1998 (age 28)
- Place of birth: Zaragoza, Spain
- Height: 1.60 m (5 ft 3 in)
- Position: Midfielder

Team information
- Current team: Espanyol
- Number: 17

Senior career*
Years	Team	Apps	(Gls)
2011–2013	Zaragoza C		
2013–2018	Zaragoza	68	(6)
2018–2019	Rayo Vallecano	16	(1)
2019–2020	Zaragoza	21	(7)
2020–2022	Alavés	26	(3)
2022	Zaragoza		
2022–2024	Granada CF		
2024–	Real Betis		
- * Club domestic league appearances and goals as of 14:22, 30 October 2021 (UTC)

Naima García Aguilar (born 24 June 1998) is a Spanish professional footballer who plays as a midfielder for Liga F club Espanyol.

== Club career ==
García started her career at Zaragoza C.
