= Leles (footballer) =

Spanish footballer (born 1997)

Personal information
- Full name: María de los Ángeles Carrión Egido
- Date of birth: 22 February 1997 (age 29)
- Place of birth: Alpera, Spain
- Height: 1.65 m (5 ft 5 in)
- Position: Midfielder

Team information
- Current team: Granada CF
- Number: 20

Senior career*
Years	Team	Apps	(Gls)
2010–2012	CFF Albacete B		
2012–2014	CFF Albacete		
2014–2016	Fundación Albacete	57	(7)
2016–2018	Valencia	9	(1)
2018–2021	Fundación Albacete	71	(9)
2021–2022	Rayo Vallecano	11	(0)

International career^{‡}
2014	Spain U17	3	(0)
2014–2016	Spain U19	5	(0)
- * Club domestic league appearances and goals as of 16:03, 27 November 2021 (UTC) ‡ National team caps and goals as of 16:03, 27 November 2021 (UTC)

María de los Ángeles Carrión Egido (born 22 February 1997), most commonly known as Leles, is a Spanish footballer who plays as a midfielder for Granada CF.

== Club career ==
Leles started her career at CFF Albacete B.
