= Maya Yamamoto =

Japanese footballer

Personal information
- Date of birth: 5 February 1993 (age 33)
- Place of birth: Tokyo, Japan
- Height: 1.61 m (5 ft 3 in)
- Position: Midfielder

Team information
- Current team: INAC Kobe Leonessa

Maya Yamamoto (born 5 February 1993) is a Japanese professional footballer, who plays as a midfielder. She played in Spain from 2016 to 2022 and is now playing in Japan since 2022 for the WE League club INAC Kobe Leonessa.

Seasons and football teams :

2016/2017 : FC Valence Fém

2017/2018: Zaragoza CFF Fém

2018/2019, 2019/2020 : Deportivo Abanca

2020/2021, 2021/2022 : RCD Espanyol Fém

2022/2023, 2023/2024, 2024/2025, 2025/2026 : INAC Kobe Leonessa Fém
