= Paula Nicart =

Spanish footballer (born 1994)

Personal information
- Full name: Paula Nicart Mejías
- Date of birth: 8 September 1994 (age 32)
- Place of birth: Cornellà de Llobregat, Catalonia, Spain
- Height: 1.71 m (5 ft 7 in)
- Position: Defender

Youth career
- UE Cornellà
- UE Sant Joan D’Espí
- FC Barcelona

Senior career*
Years	Team	Apps	(Gls)
2008–2011	Barcelona B		
2011–2013	Levante Las Planas		
2013–2014	Sant Gabriel	24	(3)
2014–2020	Valencia	96	(11)
2020–2021	Espanyol	30	(2)
2021–2022	Sevilla	12	(1)

International career
2010–2011	Spain U17	5	(0)
2015–20??	Spain	3	(0)
2014–20??	Catalonia	2	(0)
- * Club domestic league appearances and goals as of 12:34, 14 December 2021 (UTC)

Paula Nicart Mejías (born 8 September 1994) is a Spanish former footballer who played as a defender.

== International career ==
Nicart made her debut with Spain at a friendly match against Belgium, a 2–1 win in San Pedro del Pinatar on 11 February 2015. She came on as a substitute for teammate Ivana Andrés in the 86th minute.

== Personal life ==
Nicart is a medical student.
