= María Ortiz (footballer) =

Spanish footballer (born 1999)

Personal information
- Full name: María Ortiz Heras
- Date of birth: 10 February 1999 (age 27)
- Place of birth: Torrent, Spain
- Position: Defender

Senior career*
Years	Team	Apps	(Gls)
2014–2015	Cituat de Torrent		
2015–2021	Valencia B	20+	(1+)
2018–2021	Valencia	25	(0)
2021	Granadilla	1	(0)
2021–2022	Granadilla B	27	(0)
2022–2023	Real Oviedo	27	(1)
2023–2026	Real Racing Club	68	(8)
- * Club domestic league appearances and goals as of 23:17, 12 December 2021 (UTC)

María Ortiz Heras (born 10 February 1999) is a Spanish footballer who plays as a defender.

== Club career ==
Ortiz started her career at Cituat de Torrent.
