= L'Alcúdia =

- Municipality
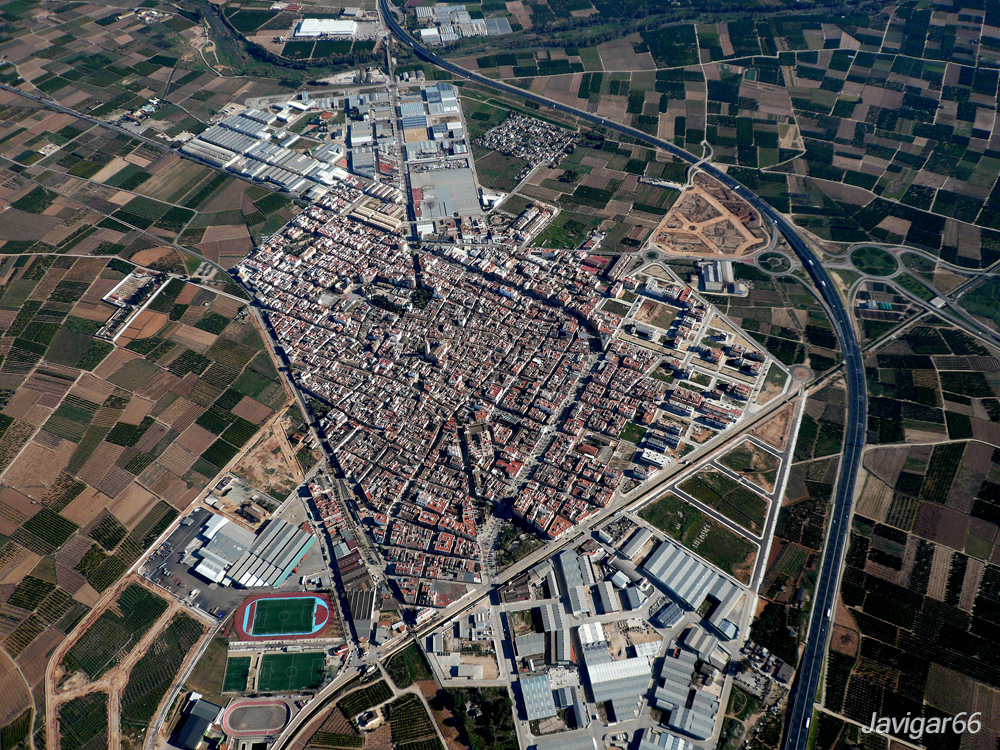

- Coat of arms

- Location in Spain
- Coordinates: 39°11′45″N 0°30′26″W
- Country: Spain
- Autonomous community: Valencian Community
- Province: Valencia
- Comarca: Ribera Alta
- Judicial district: Carlet

Government
  - Mayor: Andreu Salom Porta

Area
  - Total: 23.7 km^{2} (9.2 sq mi)
- Elevation: 40 m (130 ft)

Population (2025-01-01)
  - Total: 12,587
  - Density: 531/km^{2} (1,380/sq mi)
- Demonyms: Alcudianos, Alcudiencs
- Time zone: UTC+1 (CET)
  - Summer (DST): UTC+2 (CEST)
- Postal code: 46250
- Official language(s): Valencian
- Website: Official website

L'Alcúdia is a town and municipality in the province of Valencia, Spain. It is located on the left bank of the river Xúquer.

== History ==
The locality is named after a 13th-century Moorish farmhouse, granted in 1238 by the Aragonese king Jaume I (James I) to Pere de Montagut. On January 17, 1252, this latter conceded the right to found a township upon these lands to 54 Christian pioneers after the Reconquista of the Valencian Moorish territories. The town was involved in many of the conflicts that shook Spain throughout its history: it was sacked during the "Revolta de les Germanies" in the beginning of the 16th century; in the 18th century, during the War of the Spanish Succession, the Bourbon troops plundered it again, and finally, during the Peninsular War it lodged a camp of French troops that looted everything from the villagers, leaving them in debt. During the Spanish Civil War, it was lucky to keep on the rearguard, although this did not spare the town from being bombed by Italian fascist planes, supporting Franco's uprising.

A former name for this locality in Spanish is Alcudia de Carlet, which was in use during Franco's regime. After Franco's death in 1975 and the institution of democracy in Spain, the name fell into disfavor and the population unanimously voted to change it.

== Economic resources ==
Up to not many years ago the town relied almost exclusively on its agriculture production (mainly oranges and vegetables), some years ago a new product was re-introduced into the orchards of l'Alcudia and the surrounding district, the caqui (Persimmon) which has become a major source of revenue for Alcudian growers. l'Alcúdia has recently become an industrial town, with a number of factories producing furniture and general light industry.

== Main sights ==
Notable architectural structures in the municipality include:

- The Franciscan convent, ca. 1600, in ruins but with plans for restoration in progress
- Church of the Immaculada (Verge de la Purisima) in Montortal, 17th century.
- Church of Sant Andreu.
- The Waterwheel (La Noria), dating from the 19th century,
- La Mota, an aqueduct from the 19th century that pumped water from the Royal Irrigation Canal of the river Xuquer and provided water to almost the whole zone
- The House of Culture, inaugurated in 1987, a modern and singular building.
- L'Hort de Manus, where the Verge of the Church of Sant Andreu was reportedly hidden under a cattle trough during the Spanish Civil War

== Notable people ==
- Andrés Palop, former footballer
- Luis Puig, former President of the Union Cycliste Internationale.
- Voro, former footballer and former assistant manager of Valencia.
- Arturo Torró, politician, businessman and former Mayor Of Gandía from 2011 to 2015

== See also ==
- List of municipalities in Valencia
