= Andrea Esteban =

Spanish footballer (born 1996)

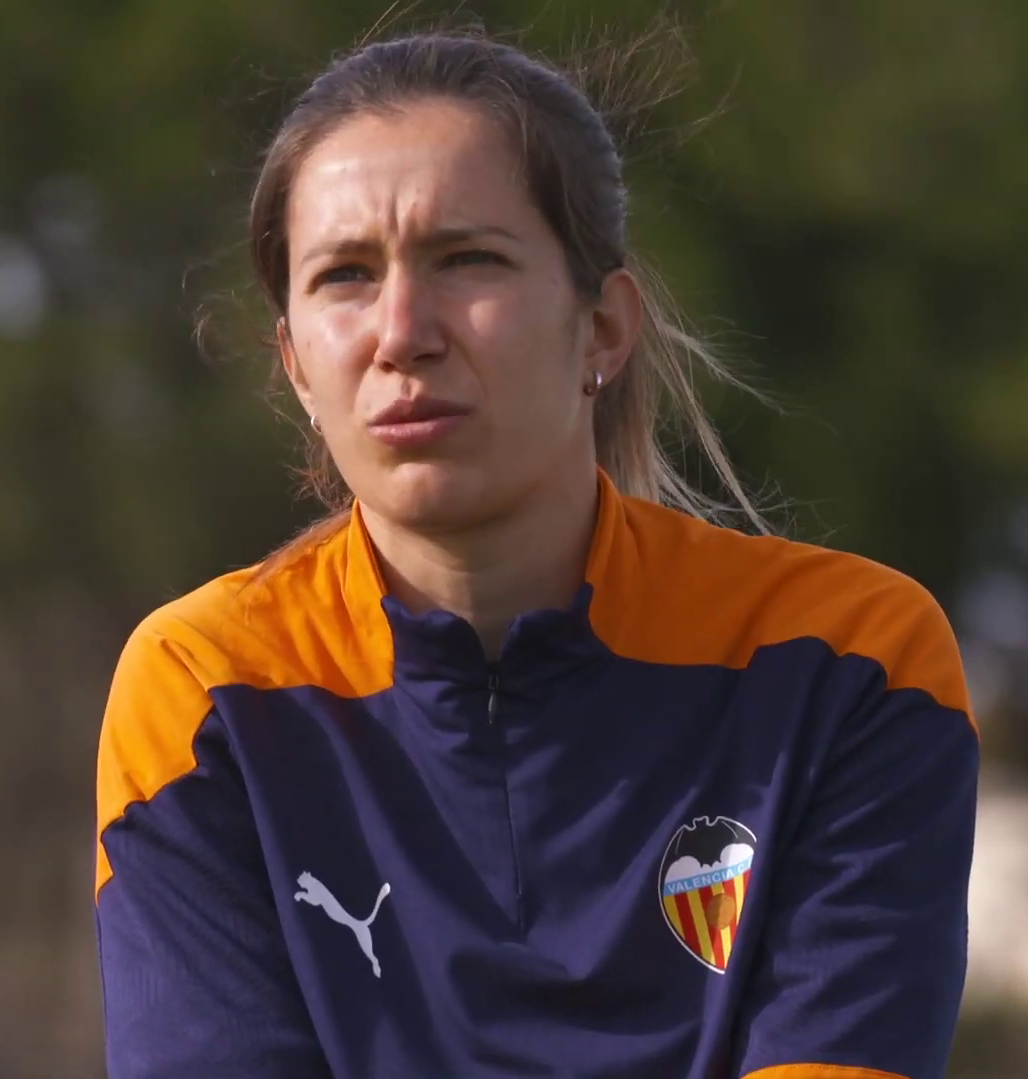

Personal information
- Full name: Andrea Esteban Catalán
- Date of birth: 29 February 1996 (age 30)
- Place of birth: Teruel, Spain
- Position: Striker

Team information
- Current team: Valencia (Manager)

Senior career*
| Years | Team | Apps | (Gls) |
| 2010–2016 | Levante | | |
| 2017–2019 | Valencia | 5 | (0) |

Managerial career
- 2016–2017: Levante B (assistant)
- 2021–: Valencia
- * Club domestic league appearances and goals as of 5 May 2019

Andrea Esteban Catalán is a Spanish former football striker who mainly played for Levante UD in Spain's Primera División. She is currently the manager of Primera División (women) side Valencia.

She was a member of the Spain Under-17 team that won its second U-17 European Championship in April 2011, but she was seriously injured in the first match and missed the rest of the tournament.

With only 23 years old, Esteban announced her retirement after five surgeries.
