= María Alharilla =

Spanish footballer (born 1990)

Alharilla Casado
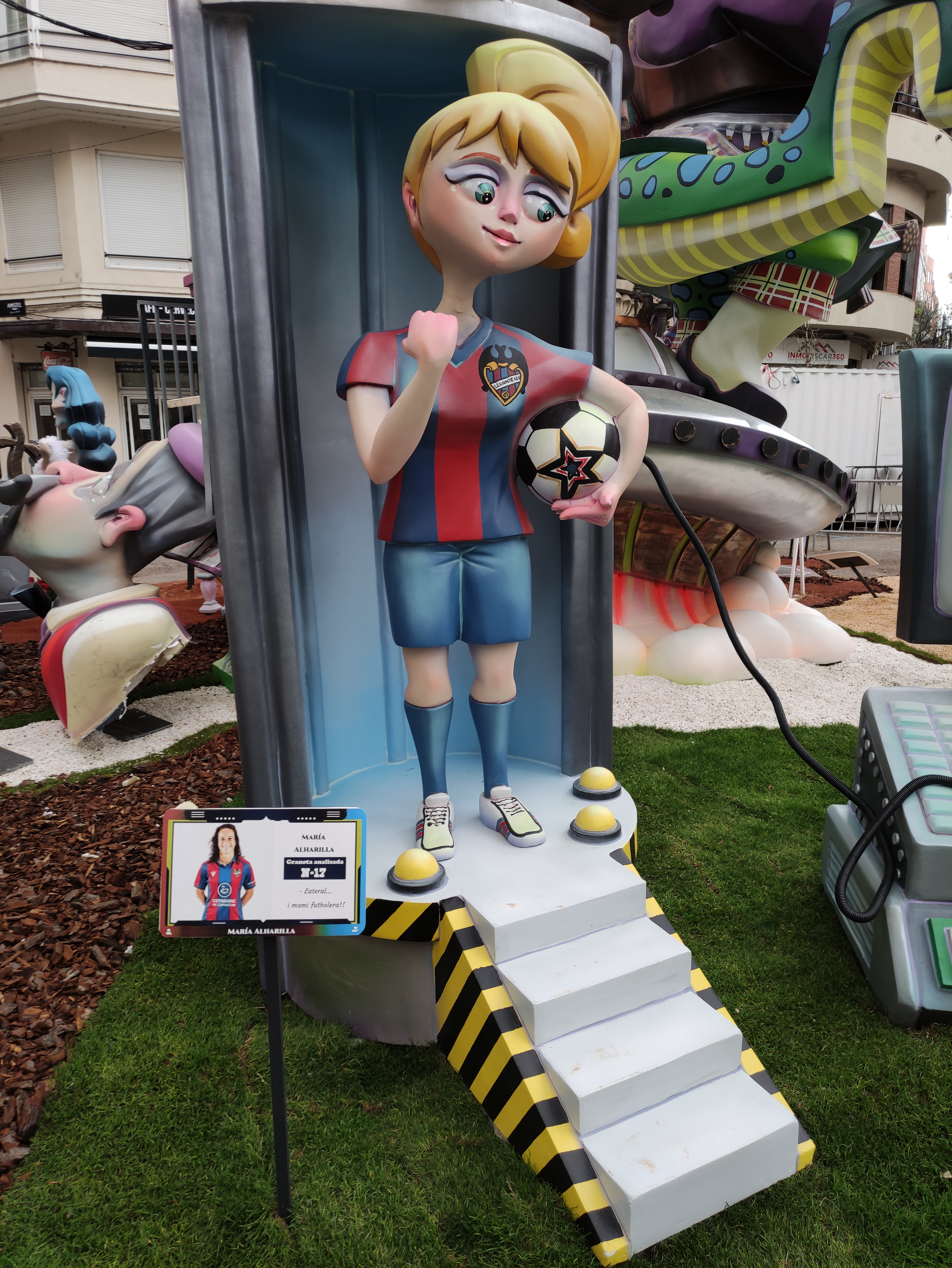

Personal information
- Full name: María Alharilla Casado Morente
- Date of birth: 13 November 1990 (age 35)
- Place of birth: Jaén, Spain
- Height: 1.63 m (5 ft 4 in)
- Positions: Right winger; right midfielder; right wing-back

Team information
- Current team: Levante
- Number: 17

Senior career*
Years	Team	Apps	(Gls)
2007–2010	Jaén		
2010–2012	Sporting Huelva	60	(28)
2012–	Levante	188	(35)

International career
2008	Spain U19	10	(3)
2009–	Spain	6	(1)
- * Club domestic league appearances and goals as of 5 May 2019

María Alharilla Casado Morente (born 13 November 1990) is a Spanish professional footballer who plays as a right back for Primera División club Levante UD and the Spain women's national team.

== International career ==
Alharilla debuted for the Spain national team in a 2011 World Cup qualifier against Austria in October 2009. She subsequently scored her first goal in a 9–0 win over Malta.

=== International goals ===
María Alharilla – goals for Spain
#	Date	Venue	Opponent	Score	Result	Competition
1.	24 June 2010	Estadio Municipal de La Albuera, Segovia	Malta	6–0	9-0	2011 FIFA Women's World Cup qualification

== Honours ==
=== International ===
Spain

- Cyprus Cup: Winner, 2018
