= Villarreal CF (women) =

Spanish football club

Villarreal
- Full name: Villarreal Club de Fútbol, S.A.D.
- Founded: 2000; 26 years ago
- Stadium: Ciudad Deportiva Villarreal CF
- Capacity: 5,000
- Owner: Fernando Roig
- President: Fernando Roig
- Head coach: Jordi Feriols
- League: Second Division (II)
- 2025–26: Primera Federación, 6th
Home colours	Away colours	Third colours

Villarreal Club de Fútbol Femenino is the women's football team of Villarreal CF. It currently plays in Primera Federación.

== Season by season ==
Season	Div.	Pos.	Copa de la Reina
2001–02	2ª	4th	
2002–03	2ª	3rd	
2003–04	2ª	6th	
2004–05	2ª		
2005–06	Reg.		
2006–07	Reg.		
2007–08	Reg.	Reg.	
2008–09	Reg.	2nd	
2009–10	Reg.	1st	
2010–11	2ª	12th	
2011–12	2ª	5th	

Season	Div.	Pos.	Copa de la Reina
2012–13	2ª	4th	
2013–14	2ª	7th	
2014–15	2ª	7th	
2015–16	2ª	8th	
2016–17	2ª	6th	
2017–18	2ª	8th	
2018–19	2ª	3rd (Note: The team qualified to move up to the new Primera División B but remained in the second tier of the system due to its creation.)	
2019–20	2ªP	4th	
2020–21	2ªP	1st	
2021–22	1ª	12th	Round of 16
2022–23	1ª	14th	Quarter-final
2023–24	1ª	15th	Third round
2024–25	1ªP	10th	Round of 16
2025–26	1ªP	6th	Second round

== Players ==
=== Current squad ===
As of 5 July 2026

Note: Flags indicate national team as defined under FIFA eligibility rules; some limited exceptions apply. Players may hold more than one non-FIFA nationality.

No.	Pos.	Nation	Player
1	GK	ESP	Montse Quesada
4	DF	ESP	Irene Miguélez
6	MF	ESP	Cienfu
8	MF	ESP	María Romero
10	MF	ESP	Marta Querol
11	MF	ESP	Sara Medina
12	DF	GER	Svenja Paulsen
13	GK	ESP	Mar Segarra
14	DF	ESP	Nerea Pérez (captain)
15	MF	ECU	Ligia Moreira
18	FW	ESP	María Macías
19	FW	ESP	Albeta López

No.	Pos.	Nation	Player
20	FW	ESP	Lauris Rodríguez
21	FW	PHI	Alexia Jr.
22	FW	ESP	Aixa Salvador
27	MF	ESP	Luna Figols
28	MF	ESP	Estela Loza
29	FW	ESP	Balma Villamarín
30	DF	ESP	Claudia Enseñat
32	DF	FRA	Roxanne Bolduc
33	MF	ESP	Luna Torremocha
35	GK	ESP	Edith López
37	MF	ESP	Adriana Casanova
—	FW	ESP	Vera Rico
