= 2026–27 Liga F =

Spanish women's football league season

Liga F
- Season: 2026–27
- Dates: 29 August 2026 – 23 May 2027
- Teams: 16
- Matches: 87
- Goals: 243 (2.79 per match)
- Top goalscorer: Clàudia Pina (11)
- Biggest home win: Barcelona 7–0 Real Madrid; 4 October 2026
- Biggest away win: Alavés 0–6 Barcelona; 18 September 2026
- Highest scoring: Real Sociedad 3–5 Real Madrid; 26 September 2026
- Highest attendance: 40,533 Barcelona 7–0 Real Madrid; 4 October 2026
- Lowest attendance: 73 Madrid CFF 2–1 Deportivo Abanca; 31 October 2026
- All statistics correct as of 15 November 2026.

The 2026-27 Primera División Femenina de Fútbol season, branded as Liga F Moeve due to sponsorship reasons, is the 39th edition of the Primera División Femenina de España de fútbol. The tournament is organised by the Liga Profesional Femenina de Fútbol (LPFF).

Barcelona are the defending champions after winning the previous edition.

== Teams ==
=== Changes ===
The following teams changed division since the 2025–26 season.

▲ Promoted from Primera Federación	▼ Relegated to Primera Federación
Alavés; Valencia	Alhama; Levante

=== Stadium and location ===
Locations of teams in the 2026–27 Liga F
Locations of teams in the 2026–27 Liga F from Community of Madrid
Locations of teams in the 2026–27 Liga F from Barcelona Province
Locations of teams in the 2026–27 Liga F from Basque Country
Locations of teams in the 2026–27 Liga F from Canary Islands

Team	Location	Stadium	Capacity	2025–26 season
Alavés^{↑}	Vitoria-Gasteiz	Mendizorrotza	19,840	2nd in Primera Federación
Athletic Club	Lezama	Lezama Facilities	3,250	7th in Liga F
Atlético Madrid	Alcalá de Henares	Centro Deportivo Wanda	2,700	5th in Liga F
Badalona Women	Palamós	Palamós Costa Brava	3,724	10th in Liga F
Barcelona	Sant Joan Despí	Johan Cruyff	6,000	1st in Liga F
Deportivo Abanca	A Coruña	Riazor	32,490	11th in Liga F
Eibar	Eibar	Ipurua	8,164	13th in Liga F
Espanyol	Sant Adrià de Besòs	Dani Jarque	1,520	12th in Liga F
Granada	Granada	Ciudad Deportiva del Granada	600	6th in Liga F
Logroño United	Logroño	Las Gaunas	16,000	14th in Liga F
Madrid CFF	Fuenlabrada	Fernando Torres	5,400	9th in Liga F
Real Madrid	Madrid	Alfredo Di Stéfano	5,797	2nd in Liga F
Real Sociedad	San Sebastián	José Luis Orbegozo	2,500	3rd in Liga F
Sevilla	Seville	Jesús Navas	8,000	8th in Liga F
Tenerife	Santa Cruz de Tenerife	Heliodoro Rodríguez López	22,824	4th in Liga F
Valencia^{↑}	Paterna	Ciudad Deportiva de Paterna	3,000	Promotion play-off winner

^{↑}	Promoted from the Primera Federación

=== Personnel and kits ===
Team	Manager	Captain	Kit manufacturer	Main shirt sponsor
Alavés	(Spain national football team) Andrea Esteban	(Spain national football team) Gaste	(Italy) Macron	Elproex
Athletic Club	(Spain national football team) Víctor Martín	(Spain national football team) Irene Oguiza	(England) Castore	Kosner
Atlético Madrid	(Spain national football team) David González	(Spain national football team) Lola Gallardo	(United States) Nike	Riyadh Air
Badalona Women	(Spain national football team) Marc Ballester	(Spain national football team) Sonia García Majarín	(United States) Nike	Ebro
Barcelona	(Spain national football team) Pere Romeu	(Spain national football team) Patricia Guijarro	(United States) Nike	Spotify
Deportivo Abanca	(Spain national football team) Alberto Rodríguez	(Spain national football team) Olaya Rodriguez	(United States) Nike	Abanca
Eibar	(Spain national football team) Iñaki Goikoetxea	(Spain national football team) Arene Altonaga	(Denmark) Hummel	Smartlog
Espanyol	(Spain national football team) Sara Monforte	(Spain national football team) Lucía Vallejo	(Spain) Kelme	Área Jurídica
Granada	(Spain national football team) Adrián Martin	(Spain national football team) Lauri	(Germany) Adidas	TuSuper
Logroño United	(Spain national football team) Santiago García	(Spain national football team) Isina Corte	(Denmark) Hummel	
Madrid CFF	(Spain national football team) José Luis Sánchez Vera	(Spain national football team) Paola Ulloa	(United States) Nike	Thermor
Real Madrid	(Spain national football team) Pau Quesada	(Spain national football team) Athenea del Castillo	(Germany) Adidas	Emirates
Real Sociedad	(Spain national football team) Gorka Álvarez	(Spain national football team) Nerea Eizagirre	(Spain) Joma	
Sevilla	(Spain national football team) David Losada	(Spain national football team) Esther Sullastres	(Germany) Adidas	Social Energy
Tenerife	(Spain national football team) Yerai Martín	(Spain national football team) Patri Gavira	(Denmark) Hummel	Costa Adeje
Valencia	(Spain national football team) Mikel Crespo	(Spain national football team) Pauleta	(Germany) Puma	TM Real Estate Group

=== Managerial changes ===
==== Pre-season ====
Team	Outgoing manager	Manner	Date of vacancy	Replaced by	Date of arrival	Reference
Athletic Club	(Spain) Javier Lerga	End of contract	30 June 2026	(Spain) Víctor Martín	1 July 2026	
Atlético Madrid	(Spain) José Ángel Herrera	End of contract	30 June 2026	(Spain) David González	1 July 2026	
Deportivo Abanca	(Spain) Fran Alonso	End of contract	30 June 2026	(Spain) Alberto Rodríguez	8 July 2026	
Granada	(Spain) Irene Ferreras	End of contract	24 July 2026	(Spain) Adrián Martin	24 July 2026	
Logroño United	(Spain) Daniel Montoya	End of contract	31 July 2026	(Spain) Santiago García	6 August 2026	
Real Sociedad	(Spain) Arturo Ruiz	End of contract	27 August 2026	(Spain) Fernando Torres	28 August 2026	

==== During the season ====
Team	Outgoing manager	Manner	Date of vacancy	Position in table	Replaced by	Date of appointment	Reference
Real Sociedad	(Spain) Fernando Torres	End of interim	1 September 2026	14	(Spain) Gorka Álvarez	1 September 2026	

== League table ==
=== Standings ===
Pos	Team	Pld	W	D	L	GF	GA	GD	Pts	Qualification or relegation
1	Barcelona	11	9	1	1	42	6	+36	28	Qualification for the Champions League league phase
2	Real Madrid	11	7	3	1	26	21	+5	24	Qualification for the Champions League league phase
3	Atlético Madrid	11	7	1	3	24	13	+11	22	Qualification for the Champions League third qualifying round
4	Athletic Club	11	5	4	2	17	12	+5	19	
5	Tenerife	10	5	2	3	17	15	+2	17	
6	Madrid CFF	11	5	2	4	18	24	−6	17	
7	Espanyol	11	4	3	4	15	14	+1	15	
8	Logroño United	11	4	1	6	14	16	−2	13	
9	Real Sociedad	11	3	4	4	14	19	−5	13	
10	Deportivo Abanca	11	3	3	5	12	14	−2	12	
11	Eibar	11	3	3	5	11	15	−4	12	
12	Granada	11	3	3	5	9	16	−7	12	
13	Alavés	10	3	2	5	8	14	−6	11	
14	Sevilla	11	2	4	5	12	18	−6	10	
15	Badalona Women	11	2	3	6	12	23	−11	9	Relegation to Primera Federación
16	Valencia	11	2	1	8	8	19	−11	7	Relegation to Primera Federación

Updated to match(es) played on 15 November 2026. Source: LigaF.es
Rules for classification: 1) Points; 2) Head-to-head points; 3) Goal difference; 4) Number of goals scored

=== Results ===
First leg

Game day 1
Home team	Results	Away team	Stadium	Date	Time	Attendance	Referee	Yellow card	Red card
Real Sociedad	0 – 2	Logroño United	Zubieta Facilities	29 August 2026	12:00	515	Beatriz Cuesta	3	0
Deportivo Abanca	0 – 1	Sevilla	Riazor	29 August 2026	12:00	727	Elena Peláez Arnillas	1	0
Eibar	1 – 0	Espanyol	Ipurua	29 August 2026	17:00	271	Paola Cebollada López	1	0
Madrid CFF	3 – 1	Granada	Fernando Torres	29 August 2026	21:00	192	Arantza Gallastegui Pérez	2	0
Athletic Club	3 – 1	Badalona Women	Lezama Facilities	30 August 2026	12:00	662	María Gloria Planes Terol	9	0
Alavés	2 – 0	Valencia	Mendizorrotza	30 August 2026	17:00	683	Ylenia Sánchez	1	0
Barcelona	5 – 0	Tenerife	Johan Cruyff	30 August 2026	19:00	2,458	Lorena del Mar Trujillano	6	0
Real Madrid	3 – 2	Atlético Madrid	Alfredo Di Stéfano	30 August 2026	21:00	1,815	Alicia Espinosa	3	2

Game day 2
Home team	Results	Away team	Stadium	Date	Time	Attendance	Referee	Yellow card	Red card
Espanyol	0 – 1	Badalona Women	Dani Jarque	5 September 2026	12:00	611	Ylenia Sánchez	4	0
Valencia	1 – 3	Madrid CFF	Paterna	5 September 2026	12:00	376	Lorena del Mar Trujillano	4	0
Sevilla	0 – 4	Barcelona	Jesús Navas	5 September 2026	20:30	971	Melissa López	0	0
Atlético Madrid	1 – 0	Alavés	Centro Deportivo Wanda	6 September 2026	12:00	1,230	Ágata López	6	0
Tenerife	0 – 0	Deportivo Abanca	Heliodoro Rodríguez López	6 September 2026	12:45	1,912	Ainara Andrea Acevedo	6	1
Logroño United	0 – 1	Athletic Club	Las Gaunas	6 September 2026	18:30	584	Zulema González González	10	1
Real Madrid	0 – 0	Eibar	Alfredo Di Stéfano	6 September 2026	20:30	816	Eugenia Gil Soriano	3	0
Granada	3 – 2	Real Sociedad	Ciudad Deportiva del Granada	7 September 2026	19:30	384	Alicia Espinosa	1	0

Game day 3
Home team	Results	Away team	Stadium	Date	Time	Attendance	Referee	Yellow card	Red card
Deportivo Abanca	0 – 2	Real Madrid	Riazor	11 September 2026	20:45	1,266	Elena Peláez	2	0
Athletic Club	2 – 2	Espanyol	Lezama Facilities	12 September 2026	12:00	698	Melissa López	1	1
Madrid CFF	1 – 0	Sevilla	Fernando Torres	12 September 2026	16:30	137	Ainara Andrea Acevedo	5	0
Barcelona	4 – 2	Atlético Madrid	Johan Cruyff	12 September 2026	19:00	3,207	Lorena del Mar Trujillano	1	0
Alavés	1 – 0	Granada	Mendizorrotza	13 September 2026	12:00	645	Zulema González González	7	0
Real Sociedad	1 – 1	Tenerife	Zubieta Facilities	13 September 2026	12:00	440	Elisabeth Calvo Valentín	5	0
Logroño United	2 – 1	Valencia	Las Gaunas	13 September 2026	17:00	380	Ágata López	6	0
Eibar	1 – 4	Badalona Women	Ipurua	13 September 2026	19:30	259	Beatriz Cuesta	0	0

Game day 4
Home team	Results	Away team	Stadium	Date	Time	Attendance	Referee	Yellow card	Red card
Alavés	0 – 6	Barcelona	Mendizorrotza	18 September 2026	20:00	1,509	Alicia Espinosa	1	0
Badalona Women	0 – 0	Real Sociedad	Palamós Costa Brava	19 September 2026	12:00	122	Paola Cebollada	1	2
Espanyol	5 – 1	Madrid CFF	Dani Jarque	19 September 2026	16:00	318	Elena Peláez	2	0
Atlético Madrid	1 – 0	Logroño United	Centro Deportivo Wanda	19 September 2026	18:00	1,027	Beatriz Cuesta	2	0
Real Madrid	3 – 1	Valencia	Alfredo Di Stéfano	19 September 2026	20:30	902	Arantza Gallastegui	2	0
Granada	0 – 3	Deportivo Abanca	Ciudad Deportiva del Granada	20 September 2026	12:00	305	Elisabeth Calvo Valentín	5	0
Tenerife	1 – 3	Sevilla	Heliodoro Rodríguez López	20 September 2026	12:00	1,892	María Gloria Planes	6	0
Eibar	1 – 0	Athletic Club	Ipurua	20 September 2026	18:00	731	Ágata López	1	0

Game day 5
Home team	Results	Away team	Stadium	Date	Time	Attendance	Referee	Yellow card	Red card
Badalona Women	0 – 1	Granada	Palamós Costa Brava	26 September 2026	12:00	76	Ágata López	4	0
Real Sociedad	3 – 5	Real Madrid	Zubieta Facilities	26 September 2026	12:00	725	Ainara Andrea Acevedo	8	0
Logroño United	0 – 2	Barcelona	Las Gaunas	26 September 2026	16:30	1,837	Arantza Gallastegui	1	0
Madrid CFF	1 – 0	Alavés	Fernando Torres	26 September 2026	18:30	298	Beatriz Cuesta	7	1
Athletic Club	3 – 2	Atlético Madrid	Lezama Facilities	27 September 2026	12:00	1,187	Elena Peláez	7	2
Valencia	1 – 2	Tenerife	Paterna	27 September 2026	12:00	586	Eugenia Gil Soriano	2	0
Sevilla	0 – 1	Eibar	Jesús Navas	27 September 2026	16:00	232	Zulema González González	4	0
Deportivo Abanca	1 – 1	Espanyol	Riazor	27 September 2026	18:00	1,194	Lorena del Mar Trujillano	2	1

Game day 6
Home team	Results	Away team	Stadium	Date	Time	Attendance	Referee	Yellow card	Red card
Espanyol	1 – 0	Alavés	Dani Jarque	3 October 2026	12:00	435	Elisabeth Calvo Valentín	5	0
Sevilla	3 – 3	Badalona Women	Jesús Navas	3 October 2026	12:00	131	Beatriz Cuesta	6	0
Deportivo Abanca	1 – 2	Atlético Madrid	Riazor	3 October 2026	16:00	1,228	Arantza Gallastegui Pérez	0	0
Madrid CFF	2 – 2	Athletic Club	Fernando Torres	3 October 2026	18:00	205	Eugenia Gil Soriano	6	0
Tenerife	2 – 1	Logroño United	Heliodoro Rodríguez López	4 October 2026	12:00	1,637	Melissa López	6	0
Granada	0 – 0	Eibar	Ciudad Deportiva del Granada	4 October 2026	12:00	269	Ainara Andrea Acevedo	8	1
Barcelona	7 – 0	Real Madrid	Camp Nou	4 October 2026	19:00	40,533 (Note: Record assistance for any game in Liga F.)	María Gloria Planes	5	0
Valencia	0 – 1	Real Sociedad	Paterna	4 October 2026	19:30	723	Alicia Espinosa	7	0

Game day 7
Home team	Results	Away team	Stadium	Date	Time	Attendance	Referee	Yellow card	Red card
Logroño United	2 – 3	Granada	Las Gaunas	17 October 2026	12:00	358	Ylenia Sánchez	3	1
Badalona Women	0 – 4	Tenerife	Palamós Costa Brava	17 October 2026	12:00	82	Zulema González González	4	2
Athletic Club	1 – 0	Valencia	Lezama Facilities	17 October 2026	16:30	580	María Gloria Planes	3	1
Real Madrid	3 – 1	Espanyol	Alfredo Di Stéfano	17 October 2026	20:30	1,003	Ágata López	4	0
Alavés	1 – 1	Sevilla	Mendizorrotza	18 October 2026	12:00	580	Paola Cebollada	2	0
Real Sociedad	2 – 1	Barcelona	Zubieta Facilities	18 October 2026	12:00	1,245	Melissa López	4	0
Eibar	2 – 3	Deportivo Abanca	Ipurua	18 October 2026	16:00	286	Alicia Espinosa	5	0
Atlético Madrid	4 – 0	Madrid CFF	Centro Deportivo Wanda	18 October 2026	18:00	1,340	Ainara Andrea Acevedo	6	1

Game day 8
Home team	Results	Away team	Stadium	Date	Time	Attendance	Referee	Yellow card	Red card
Atlético Madrid	4 – 0	Valencia	Centro Deportivo Wanda	23 October 2026	19:30	908	Zulema González González	3	0
Athletic Club	0 – 0	Sevilla	Lezama Facilities	24 October 2026	12:00	541	Ainara Andrea Acevedo	2	0
Real Sociedad	1 – 1	Espanyol	Zubieta Facilities	24 October 2026	12:00	520	Elena Peláez	0	0
Real Madrid	3 – 2	Tenerife	Alfredo Di Stéfano	24 October 2026	16:00	1,005	Lorena del Mar Trujillano	3	1
Logroño United	1 – 0	Badalona Women	Las Gaunas	24 October 2026	18:15	214	Elisabeth Calvo Valentín	4	0
Barcelona	3 – 0	Granada	Johan Cruyff	24 October 2026	20:30	2,663	Eugenia Gil Soriano	1	0
Deportivo Abanca	2 – 1	Alavés	Riazor	25 October 2026	12:45	887	Ylenia Sánchez	2	1
Eibar	2 – 2	Madrid CFF	Ipurua	25 October 2026	17:00	237	Beatriz Cuesta	4	0

Game day 9
Home team	Results	Away team	Stadium	Date	Time	Attendance	Referee	Yellow card	Red card
Granada	1 – 1	Atlético Madrid	Ciudad Deportiva del Granada	31 October 2026	12:00	429	Elena Peláez	2	0
Valencia	2 – 1	Eibar	Paterna	31 October 2026	12:00	396	Melissa López	6	1
Espanyol	2 – 1	Logroño United	Dani Jarque	31 October 2026	16:00	342	Paola Cebollada	4	0
Madrid CFF	2 – 1	Deportivo Abanca	Fernando Torres	31 October 2026	18:00	73	María Gloria Planes	2	0
Alavés	1 – 1	Real Sociedad	Mendizorrotza	1 November 2026	12:00	934	Zulema González González	5	0
Badalona Women	0 – 4	Barcelona	Palamós Costa Brava	1 November 2026	12:30	2,810	Arantza Gallastegui	6	1
Sevilla	1 – 3	Real Madrid	Jesús Navas	1 November 2026	19:00	748	Eugenia Gil Soriano	1	0
Tenerife	2 – 0	Athletic Club	Heliodoro Rodríguez López	2 November 2026	20:00	2,143	Elisabeth Calvo Valentín	4	0

Game day 10
Home team	Results	Away team	Stadium	Date	Time	Attendance	Referee	Yellow card	Red card
Granada	0 – 1	Espanyol	Ciudad Deportiva del Granada	7 November 2026	12:00	274	María Gloria Planes	10	0
Athletic Club	1 – 1	Real Madrid	Lezama Facilities	7 November 2026	16:00	1,293	Beatriz Cuesta	4	0
Eibar	1 – 2	Real Sociedad	Ipurua	7 November 2026	17:00	880	Arantza Gallastegui	4	0
Logroño United	2 – 2	Sevilla	Las Gaunas	8 November 2026	12:00	388	Ágata López	5	1
Barcelona	5 – 1	Madrid CFF	Johan Cruyff	8 November 2026	16:00	2,572	Lorena Del Mar Trujillano	4	0
Atlético Madrid	3 – 0	Badalona Women	Centro Deportivo Wanda	9 November 2026	19:00	883	Paola Cebollada	4	0
Deportivo Abanca	0 – 2	Valencia	Riazor	9 November 2026	21:00	399	Ainara Andrea Acevedo	6	1
Tenerife		Alavés	Heliodoro Rodríguez López	16 December 2026 (Note: Game postponed by the RFEF due to the death of player Jesús de Miguel.)	20:00				

Game day 11
Home team	Results	Away team	Stadium	Date	Time	Attendance	Referee	Yellow card	Red card
Espanyol	1 – 3	Tenerife	Dani Jarque	14 November 2026	12:00	362	Melissa López	0	0
Alavés	2 – 1	Eibar	Mendizorrotza	14 November 2026	18:00	450	María Gloria Planes	4	0
Real Madrid	3 – 3	Badalona Women	Alfredo Di Stéfano	14 November 2026	20:30	885	Elena Peláez	5	0
Real Sociedad	1 – 4	Athletic Club	Anoeta	15 November 2026	12:00	6,202	Lorena Del Mar Trujillano	4	0
Madrid CFF	2 – 3	Logroño United	Fernando Torres	15 November 2026	12:00	87	Arantza Gallastegui	4	0
Sevilla	1 – 2	Atlético Madrid	Jesús Navas	15 November 2026	16:00	270	Beatriz Cuesta	9	0
Deportivo Abanca	1 – 1	Barcelona	Riazor	15 November 2026	18:00	4,112	Elisabeth Calvo Valentín	2	0
Valencia	0 – 0	Granada	Paterna	15 November 2026	18:15	575	Paola Cebollada	10	0

Game day 12
Home team	Results	Away team	Stadium	Date	Time	Attendance	Referee	Yellow card	Red card
Badalona Women	2 – 1	Deportivo Abanca	Palamós Costa Brava	21 November 2026	12:00		Alicia Espinosa	2	0
Eibar	1 – 3	Atlético Madrid	Ipurua	21 November 2026	17:00		Lorena Del Mar Trujillano	4	0
Logroño United	3 – 1	Alavés	Las Gaunas	21 November 2026	19:00	412	Ylenia Sánchez	4	0
Granada		Real Madrid	Ciudad Deportiva del Granada	22 November 2026	12:00		Arantza Gallastegui		
Real Sociedad		Sevilla	Zubieta Facilities	22 November 2026	12:00		María Gloria Planes		
Tenerife		Madrid CFF	Heliodoro Rodríguez López	22 November 2026	17:00		Zulema González González		
Barcelona		Athletic Club	Johan Cruyff	22 November 2026	19:00		Paola Cebollada		
Espanyol		Valencia	Dani Jarque	23 November 2026	20:00		Beatriz Cuesta		

Game day 13
Home team	Results	Away team	Stadium	Date	Time	Attendance	Referee	Yellow card	Red card
Athletic Club		Alavés	San Mamés	8 December 2026	12:00				
Badalona Women		Valencia	Palamós Costa Brava	8 December 2026	13:00				
Atlético Madrid		Tenerife	Centro Deportivo Wanda	8 December 2026	16:00				
Barcelona		Espanyol	Johan Cruyff	8 December 2026	17:00				
Real Madrid		Madrid CFF	Alfredo Di Stéfano	8 December 2026	19:00				
Deportivo Abanca		Real Sociedad	Riazor	9 December 2026	18:00				
Eibar		Logroño United	Ipurua	9 December 2026	19:00				
Sevilla		Granada	Jesús Navas	9 December 2026	20:00				

=== Results Summary ===
Home \ Away	ALA	ATH	ATM	BAR	DEP	EIB	ESP	GRA	LBA	LOG	MAD	RMA	RSO	SEV	TEN	VAL
Alavés				0–6		2–1		1–0					1–1	1–1		2–0
Athletic Club			3–2				2–2		3–1			1–1		0–0		1–0
Atlético Madrid	1–0								3–0	1–0	4–0					4–0
Barcelona			4–2					3–0			5–1	7–0			5–0	
Deportivo Abanca	2–1		1–2	1–1			1–1					0–2		0–1		0–2
Eibar		1–0	1–3		2–3		1–0		1–4		2–2		1–2			
Espanyol	1–0								0–1	2–1	5–1				1–3	
Granada			1–1		0–3	0–0	0–1						3–2			
Badalona Women				0–4	2–1			0–1					0–0		0–4	
Logroño United	3–1	0–1		0–2				2–3	1–0					2–2		2–1
Madrid CFF	1–0	2–2			2–1			3–1		2–3				1–0		
Real Madrid			3–2			0–0	3–1		3–3						3–2	3–1
Real Sociedad		1–4		2–1			1–1			0–2		3–5			1–1	
Sevilla			1–2	0–4		0–1			3–3			1–3				
Tenerife		2–0			0–0					2–1				1–3		
Valencia						2–1		0–0			1–3		0–1		1–2	

Updated to match(es) played on 21 November 2026. Source: Liga F
Legend: Blue = home team win; Yellow = draw; Red = away team win.

=== Positions by round ===
The table lists the positions of teams after each week of matches. In order to preserve chronological evolvements, any postponed matches are not included to the round at which they were originally scheduled, but added to the full round they were played immediately afterwards.

Team ╲ Round	1	2	3	4	5	6	7	8	9	10	11	12	13
Barcelona	1	1	1	1	1	1	1	1	1	1	1	1	
Real Madrid	6	4	4	2	2	3	2	2	2	2	2		
Atlético Madrid	9	8	9	8	8	6	5	3	4	3	3		
Athletic Club	2	3	3	4	4	4	3	4	5	5	4		
Tenerife	16	13	12	15	14	9	6	8	6	7	5		
Madrid CFF	3	2	2	3	3	2	4	5	3	4	6		
Espanyol	11	14	13	11	12	7	9	10	7	6	7		
Logroño United	5	7	6	7	7	12	15	11	12	12	8		
Real Sociedad	14	15	14	14	15	15	12	12	11	8	9		
Deportivo Abanca	10	12	15	12	13	14	10	7	9	10	10		
Eibar	7	5	8	6	5	5	7	6	8	9	11		
Granada	13	9	10	13	10	11	8	9	10	11	12		
Alavés	4	6	7	10	11	13	14	15	14	14	13		
Sevilla	8	11	11	9	9	10	13	13	13	13	14		
Badalona Women	12	10	5	5	6	8	11	14	15	15	15		
Valencia	15	16	16	16	16	16	16	16	16	16	16		

Leader and Champions League league stage
Champions League league stage
Champions League qualifying round 3
Relegation to Primera Federación

Updated to match(es) played on 15 November 2026. Source: Liga F

== Season statistics ==
=== Top goalscorers ===
As of 15 November 2026

Rank	Player	Team	Goals
1	(Spain) Clàudia Pina	Barcelona	11
2	(Sweden) Felicia Schröder	Real Madrid	8
2	(Norway) Synne Jensen	Atlético Madrid	8
4	(Norway) Caroline Graham Hansen	Barcelona	6
5	(Brazil) Millene Cabral	Deportivo Abanca	5
5	(Netherlands) Esmee Brugts	Barcelona	5
5	(Spain) Ane Azkona	Athletic Club	5
8	(Morocco) Sakina Ouzraoui Diki	Madrid CFF	4
8	(Netherlands) Lineth Beerensteyn	Real Madrid	4
8	(Spain) Natalia Padilla	Tenerife	4

=== Assists ===
As of 15 November 2026

Rank	Player	Team	Assists
1	(Poland) Ewa Pajor	Barcelona	8
2	(Norway) Caroline Graham Hansen	Barcelona	7
3	(Spain) Patri Guijarro	Barcelona	6
4	(Poland) Aleksandra Zaremba	Tenerife	5
5	(Spain) Fiamma Benítez	Atlético Madrid	4
6	(Spain) Clàudia Pina	Barcelona	3
6	(Spain) Elena Julve	Badalona Women	3
6	(Spain) Nerea Eizagirre	Real Sociedad	3
6	(France) Annahita Zamanian	Tenerife	3
6	(Spain) Marina Rivas	Madrid CFF	3
6	(Venezuela) Michi Apóstol	Deportivo Abanca	3
6	(Portugal) Andreia Jacinto	Real Madrid	3
6	(Spain) Sara Tamarit	Valencia	3
6	(Spain) Ana González	Madrid CFF	3
6	(Spain) Cecilia Marcos	Real Sociedad	3
6	(Netherlands) Lotte Keukelaar	Real Madrid	3
6	(Spain) Sara Ortega	Athletic Club	3

=== Hat-tricks ===
Player	For	Against	Minutes	Score after goals	Result	Date	Round
(Spain) Clàudia Pina	Barcelona	Alavés	55', 73', 90+4'	0–4, 0–5, 0–6	0-6 (A)	18 September 2026	4
(Spain) Clàudia Pina^{4}	Barcelona	Real Madrid	4', 28', 32', 45'	1–0, 2–0, 3–0, 5–0	7-0 (H)	4 October 2026	6

(H) – Home; (A) – Away
^{4} – Player scored four goals.

=== Clean sheets ===
As of 15 November 2026

Rank	Player	Club	Clean sheets
1	(Spain) Cata Coll	Barcelona	5
1	(Germany) Anna Wellmann	Eibar	5
3	(Spain) Adriana Nanclares	Athletic Club	3

=== Goalkeepers' Goals-to-Games Ratio ===
As of 6 September 2026, only includes players with at least 10 games played.

Rank	Name	Club	Matches	Goals Against	Average
1	(Spain)				

=== Scoring ===
- First goal of the season:
  (The Gambia) Fatou Kanteh for Sevilla against Deportivo Abanca (29 August 2026)
- Last goal of the season:

=== Discipline ===
As of 15 November 2026

	Most yellow cards	Total	Most red cards	Total	Ref.
Player	(Spain) Lucía Moral (Valencia)	5	(Sweden) Felicia Schröder (Real Madrid) (Brazil) Gio Queiroz (Atlético Madrid) (Spain) Naia Landaluze (Athletic Club) (Spain) Carla Castiñeyras (Deportivo Abanca) (Spain) María Valenzuela (Badalona Womenl) (Spain) Júlia Guerra (Espanyol) (Spain) Clara Pinedo (Athletic Club) (Sierra Leone) Kumba Zanaib Brima (Alavés) (Brazil) Luany (Atlético Madrid) (Spain) Patri Ojeda (Espanyol) (Spain) Sara Martín (Eibar) (Spain) Henar Muiña (Tenerife) (Chile) Camila Sáez (Valencia) (Spain) Lola Gallardo (Atlético Madrid) (Japan) Miku Kojima (Granada) (Spain) Patri Gavira (Tenerife) (Spain) Laia Parera (Alavés) (Spain) Gema Climent (Valencia) (Spain) Lucía Martínez (Badalona Women) (Venezuela) Michi Apóstol (Deportivo Abanca)	1	
Club	Granada	33	Atlético Madrid	3	

== Awards ==
=== Monthly awards ===
Month	Liga F Player of the Month		Reference
Month	Player	Club	Reference
September	(Spain) Clàudia Pina	Barcelona	
October	(Spain) Ainhoa Marín	Real Sociedad	

== Number of teams by autonomous community ==
Rank	Autonomous Community	Number	Teams
1	(Basque Country (autonomous community)) Basque	4	Alavés, Athletic Club, Eibar and Real Sociedad
2	Catalonia	3	Barcelona, Espanyol and Badalona Women
2	(Community of Madrid) Madrid	3	Atlético Madrid, Madrid CFF and Real Madrid
4	Andalusia	2	Granada and Sevilla
5	Canary Islands	1	Tenerife
5	(Galicia (Spain)) Galicia	1	Deportivo Abanca
5	La Rioja	1	Logroño United
5	(Valencian Community) Valencia	1	Valencia
