= 2025–26 Liga F =

Spanish women's football league season

Liga F
- Season: 2025–26
- Dates: 30 August 2025 – 31 May 2026
- Champions: Barcelona (11th title)
- Relegated: Levante; Alhama
- Champions League: Barcelona; Real Madrid; Real Sociedad
- Matches: 236
- Goals: 691 (2.93 per match)
- Top goalscorer: Clàudia Pina (21 goals)
- Biggest home win: Barcelona 12–1 Madrid CFF; 10 January 2026
- Biggest away win: Athletic Club 1–8 Barcelona; 7 September 2025
- Highest scoring: Barcelona 12–1 Madrid CFF; 10 January 2026
- Longest winning run: Barcelona (21 matches)
- Longest unbeaten run: Barcelona (21 matches)
- Longest winless run: Alhama (20 matches)
- Longest losing run: Alhama (17 matches)
- Highest attendance: 36,276; Barcelona 4–0 Real Madrid; 15 November 2025
- All statistics correct as of 31 May 2026.

The 2025–26 Primera División Femenina de Fútbol season, branded as Liga F Moeve due to sponsorship reasons, was the 38th edition of the Primera División Femenina de España de fútbol. The tournament was organised by the Liga Profesional Femenina de Fútbol (LPFF).

Barcelona were the defending champions after winning the previous edition and this is the first season where Football video support (FVS) is implemented as a preliminary step before the implementation of Video assistant referee (VAR) in women's football in the future.

Barcelona were again crowned champions, winning their seventh title in a row and their eleventh title overall.

== Teams ==
=== Changes ===
The following teams changed division since the 2024–25 season.

▲ Promoted from Primera Federación	▼ Relegated to Primera Federación
Alhama; DUX Logroño	Real Betis; Valencia

=== Stadium and location ===
Locations of teams in the 2025–26 Liga F
Locations of teams in the 2025–26 Liga F from Barcelona Province
Locations of teams in the 2025–26 Liga F from Basque Country
Locations of teams in the 2025–26 Liga F from Canary Islands

Team	Location	Stadium	Capacity	2024–25 season
Alhama^{↑}	Alhama de Murcia	Deportivo del Guadalentín	1,500	1st in Primera Federación
Athletic Club	Lezama	Lezama Field 2	3,250	4th in Liga F
Atlético Madrid	Alcalá de Henares	Centro Deportivo Wanda	2,700	3rd in Liga F
Barcelona	Sant Joan Despí	Johan Cruyff	6,000	1st in Liga F
Deportivo Abanca	A Coruña	Cidade Deportiva de Abegondo	1,000	14th in Liga F
DUX Logroño^{↑}	Logroño	Las Gaunas	16,000	Promotion play-off winner
Eibar	Eibar	Ipurua	8,164	8th in Liga F
Espanyol	Sant Adrià de Besòs	Dani Jarque	1,520	11th in Liga F
Granada	Granada	Ciudad Deportiva del Granada	600	5th in Liga F
Levante	Buñol	Ciudad Deportiva de Buñol	3,000	12th in Liga F
Badalona Women	Palamós	Estadi Palamós Costa Brava	3,724	13th in Liga F
Madrid	Fuenlabrada	Fernando Torres	5,400	10th in Liga F
Real Madrid	Madrid	Alfredo Di Stéfano	5,797	2nd in Liga F
Real Sociedad	San Sebastián	José Luis Orbegozo	2,500	7th in Liga F
Sevilla	Seville	Jesús Navas	8,000	9th in Liga F
Tenerife	Santa Cruz de Tenerife	Heliodoro Rodríguez López	22,824	6th in Liga F

^{↑}	Promoted from the Primera Federación

=== Personnel and kits ===
Team	Manager	Captain	Kit manufacturer	Main shirt sponsor
Alhama	(Spain national football team) Jovi García	(Spain national football team) Raquel Pinel	(Spain) Joma	ElPozo
Athletic Club	(Spain national football team) Javier Lerga	(Spain national football team) Irene Oguiza	(England) Castore	Kosner
Atlético Madrid	(Spain national football team) José Herrera	(Spain national football team) Lola Gallardo	(United States) Nike	Herbalife
Barcelona	(Spain national football team) Pere Romeu	(Spain national football team) Alexia Putellas	(United States) Nike	Spotify
Deportivo Abanca	(Spain national football team) Fran Alonso	(Spain national football team) Henar Muiña	(Italy) Kappa	Abanca
DUX Logroño	(Spain national football team) Daniel Montoya	(Spain national football team) Lorena Valderas	(Germany) Puma	Caixabank
Eibar	(Spain national football team) Iñaki Goikoetxea	(Spain national football team) Arene Altonaga	(Denmark) Hummel	Smartlog
Espanyol	(Spain national football team) Sara Monforte	(Spain national football team) Ainoa Campo	(Spain) Kelme	Área Jurídica
Granada	(Spain national football team) Irene Ferreras	(Spain national football team) Laura Requena	(Germany) Adidas	Weiber
Levante	(Spain national football team) Andrés París	(Spain national football team) María Alharilla	(Italy) Macron	Digital Menta
Badalona Women	(Spain national football team) Marc Ballester	(Argentina national football team) Estefanía Banini	(Denmark) Hummel	Assolim
Madrid CFF	(Spain national football team) José Luis Sánchez Vera	(Spain national football team) Paola Ulloa	(Germany) Adidas	Thermor
Real Madrid	(Spain national football team) Pau Quesada	(Spain national football team) Misa Rodríguez	(Germany) Adidas	Emirates
Real Sociedad	(Spain national football team) Arturo Ruiz	(Spain national football team) Nerea Eizagirre	(Italy) Macron	Halcón Viajes
Sevilla	(Spain national football team) David Losada	(Spain national football team) Esther Sullastres	(England) Castore	JD
Tenerife	(Spain national football team) Yerai Martín	(Spain national football team) Patri Gavira	(Denmark) Hummel	Costa Adeje

=== Managerial changes ===
==== Pre-season ====
Team	Outgoing manager	Manner	Date of vacancy	Replaced by	Date of arrival	Reference
Alhama CF	(Spain) Daniel Álvarez	Mutual consent	June 2025	(Spain) Jovi García	27 July 2025	
Athletic Club	(Spain) David Aznar	End of contract	June 2025	(Spain) Javier Lerga	1 July 2025	
Eibar	(Spain) Yerai Martín	End of contract	18 May 2025	(Spain) Iñaki Goikoetxea	20 May 2025	
Granada CF	(Spain) Arturo Ruiz	End of contract	18 May 2025	(Spain) Irene Ferreras	4 June 2025	
Levante	(Spain) Ángel Saiz	End of contract	18 May 2025	(Brazil) Emily Lima	4 August 2025	
Madrid CFF	(Spain) Juanjo Vila	End of contract	18 May 2025	(Spain) Javier Aguado	9 July 2025	
Real Madrid	(Spain) Alberto Toril	Mutual consent	28 May 2025	(Spain) Pau Quesada	17 June 2025	
Real Sociedad	(Spain) Sánchez Vera	Mutual consent	18 May 2025	(Spain) Arturo Ruiz	28 May 2025	

==== During the season ====
Team	Outgoing manager	Manner	Date of vacancy	Position in table	Replaced by	Date of appointment
Levante	(Brazil) Emily Lima	Mutual consent	8 October 2025	16	(Spain) Santi Triguero	10 October 2025
Levante	(Spain) Santi Triguero	Mutual consent	12 November 2025	16	(Spain) Andrés París	12 November 2025
Badalona Women	(Spain) Ana Junyent	Mutual consent	12 November 2025	8	(Spain) Marc Ballester	12 November 2025
Tenerife	(Spain) Eder Maestre	Mutual consent	15 December 2025	5	(Spain) Yerai Martín	2 January 2026
Madrid CFF	(Spain) Javier Aguado	Sacked	13 January 2026	7	(Spain) José Luis Sánchez Vera	14 January 2026
Atlético Madrid	(Spain) Víctor Martín	Sacked	22 January 2026	5	(Spain) José Herrera	24 January 2026
DUX Logroño	(Spain) Héctor Blanco	Mutual consent	29 January 2026	15	(Spain) Daniel Montoya	30 January 2026

== League table ==
=== Standings ===
Pos	Team	Pld	W	D	L	GF	GA	GD	Pts	Qualification or relegation
1	Barcelona (C)	30	29	0	1	130	9	+121	87	Qualification for the Champions League league phase
2	Real Madrid	30	23	3	4	65	18	+47	72	Qualification for the Champions League third qualifying round
3	Real Sociedad	30	20	6	4	61	27	+34	66	Qualification for the Champions League third qualifying round
4	Tenerife	30	14	12	4	49	22	+27	54	
5	Atlético Madrid	30	14	9	7	63	39	+24	51	
6	Granada	30	13	6	11	36	42	−6	45	
7	Athletic Club	30	12	8	10	35	44	−9	44	
8	Sevilla	30	12	5	13	33	46	−13	41	
9	Madrid CFF	30	11	4	15	41	59	−18	37	
10	Badalona Women	30	10	9	11	28	46	−18	36 (Note: The team was given a 3 points deduction, after failing to provide a team's doctor during 6 matches.)	
11	Espanyol	30	7	10	13	28	44	−16	31	
12	Deportivo Abanca	30	8	7	15	34	54	−20	31	
13	Eibar	30	8	4	18	18	47	−29	28	
14	DUX Logroño	30	4	9	17	29	54	−25	21	
15	Alhama (R)	30	3	5	22	23	78	−55	14	Relegation to Primera Federación
16	Levante (R)	30	2	3	25	18	62	−44	9	Relegation to Primera Federación

Updated to match(es) played on 31 May 2026. Source: LigaF.es
Rules for classification: 1) Points; 2) Head-to-head points; 3) Goal difference; 4) Number of goals scored
(C) Champions; (R) Relegated

=== Results ===
Home \ Away	ALH	ATH	ATM	BAR	DEP	DUX	EIB	ESP	GRA	LEV	LBA	MAD	RMA	RSO	SEV	TEN
Alhama		0–0	1–2	0–2	3–1	0–4	0–1	3–1	1–1	2–2	0–1	1–4	0–3	1–5	0–1	0–4
Athletic Club	4–1		1–2	1–8	0–1	0–0	2–0	2–1	1–2	1–0	0–0	4–1	1–4	0–2	1–1	0–0
Atlético Madrid	4–0	1–1		0–6	2–0	5–0	4–0	0–1	1–1	4–0	2–0	0–0	2–1	5–5	2–2	2–2
Barcelona	8–0	7–1	5–0		8–0	4–0	4–0	2–0	2–0	5–0	6–0	12–1	4–0	2–1	4–1	2–0
Deportivo Abanca	2–2	1–0	1–1	0–2		2–2	2–1	2–2	2–0	1–0	0–0	1–2	2–4	1–2	0–4	1–1
DUX Logroño	2–4	0–2	0–5	0–3	0–4		0–1	0–2	1–1	2–3	2–3	3–0	2–2	0–1	2–1	0–1
Eibar	2–0	0–1	2–2	0–4	1–0	2–1		1–2	0–2	2–1	0–0	1–3	0–1	0–3	0–1	0–0
Espanyol	3–0	1–1	0–5	1–4	1–1	1–1	2–0		0–2	1–0	1–1	2–5	0–1	2–3	0–0	0–0
Granada	2–0	1–5	0–4	0–2	1–0	1–0	3–1	2–0		1–0	0–2	3–4	0–3	2–2	0–2	1–1
Levante	0–0	0–1	0–1	0–4	1–2	1–4	0–1	0–1	1–2		0–1	2–1	1–2	0–1	0–1	2–4
Badalona Women	3–2	0–1	2–4	1–5	1–0	0–0	2–1	1–1	0–4	1–1		1–0	0–4	0–2	0–0	0–2
Madrid CFF	5–0	0–2	1–1	0–4	1–6	1–0	1–0	1–1	0–1	2–0	0–1		0–2	2–2	2–0	0–2
Real Madrid	5–0	0–1	1–0	0–3	4–0	1–1	3–0	3–0	2–0	4–0	3–0	2–1		1–0	2–0	2–0
Real Sociedad	3–1	1–1	2–0	1–0	3–0	1–1	3–0	2–1	3–0	2–1	2–0	2–0	0–3		3–0	1–2
Sevilla	2–1	4–0	2–1	0–5	3–1	1–0	0–0	1–0	0–1	4–2	1–5	1–3	0–2	0–2		0–4
Tenerife	1–0	5–0	2–1	1–3	2–0	1–1	0–1	0–0	2–2	4–0	2–2	2–0	0–0	1–1	3–0	

Updated to match(es) played on 31 May 2026. Source: Liga F
Legend: Blue = home team win; Yellow = draw; Red = away team win.

=== Positions by round ===
The table lists the positions of teams after each week of matches. In order to preserve chronological evolvements, any postponed matches are not included to the round at which they were originally scheduled, but added to the full round they were played immediately afterwards.

Team ╲ Round	1	2	3	4	5	6	7	8	9	10	11	12	13	14	15	16	17	18	19	20	21	22	23	24	25	26	27	28	29	30
Barcelona	1	1	1	1	1	1	1	1	1	1	1	1	1	1	1	1	1	1	1	1	1	1	1	1	1	1	1	1	1	1
Real Madrid	7	10	7	5	5	5	2	2	2	2	4	3	2	2	2	2	2	2	2	2	2	2	2	2	2	2	2	2	2	2
Real Sociedad	8	6	3	3	3	3	4	3	3	3	3	2	3	3	3	3	3	3	3	3	3	3	3	3	3	3	3	3	3	3
Tenerife	12	3	4	4	4	4	5	6	5	5	5	5	5	5	5	4	4	4	4	4	4	4	4	4	4	4	5	5	4	4
Atlético Madrid	2	2	2	2	2	2	3	4	4	4	2	4	4	4	4	5	5	5	5	6	6	6	6	5	5	5	4	4	5	5
Granada	3	7	9	6	7	7	9	10	7	9	8	11	11	12	12	11	10	10	8	7	9	7	7	7	6	6	6	6	6	6
Sevilla	4	8	10	11	12	9	7	8	9	7	7	7	7	6	6	7	6	6	6	5	5	5	5	6	7	7	7	7	7	7
Athletic Club	9	14	16	13	14	13	15	14	14	12	11	10	9	8	8	8	9	9	9	10	10	8	8	9	8	8	8	8	8	8
Madrid CFF	6	5	8	8	6	6	6	5	6	6	6	6	6	7	7	6	7	8	10	8	7	9	9	10	10	10	10	9	9	9
Badalona Women	11	4	5	7	8	10	8	7	8	8	10	9	8	10	9	9	8	7	7	9	8	10	10	8	9	9	9	10	10	10
Espanyol	15	13	11	10	13	15	12	9	11	11	9	8	10	9	11	10	11	11	12	11	12	11	11	11	11	11	11	12	12	11
Deportivo Abanca	10	9	6	9	9	11	13	12	13	14	13	13	13	13	13	13	12	12	11	12	11	12	12	12	12	12	12	11	11	12
Eibar	14	16	13	15	11	12	11	13	10	10	12	12	12	11	10	12	13	13	13	13	13	13	13	13	13	13	13	13	13	13
DUX Logroño	5	11	14	12	15	14	14	15	15	15	15	15	15	15	15	15	15	14	14	14	14	14	14	14	14	14	14	14	14	14
Alhama	16	15	12	14	10	8	10	11	12	13	14	14	14	14	14	14	14	15	15	15	15	15	15	15	15	15	15	15	15	15
Levante	13	12	15	16	16	16	16	16	16	16	16	16	16	16	16	16	16	16	16	16	16	16	16	16	16	16	16	16	16	16

Leader and Champions League league stage
Champions League qualifying round 3
Relegation to Primera Federación

Updated to match(es) played on 31 May 2026. Source: Liga F

== Season statistics ==
=== Top goalscorers ===
As of 31 May 2026, italic - player moved to another league in the winter transfer window

Rank	Player	Team	Goals
1	(Spain) Clàudia Pina	Barcelona	21
2	(Poland) Ewa Pajor	Barcelona	16
3	(Scotland) Caroline Weir	Real Madrid	14
4	(Spain) Edna Imade	Real Sociedad	11
4	(Chile) Sonya Keefe	Granada	11
6	(Portugal) Kika Nazareth	Barcelona	10
6	(Spain) Natalia Ramos	Tenerife	10
6	(Norway) Caroline Graham Hansen	Barcelona	10
6	(Spain) Vicky López	Barcelona	10
10	(Spain) Fiamma Benítez	Atlético Madrid	9
10	(Spain) Alexia Putellas	Barcelona	9
12	(Norway) Synne Jensen	Atlético Madrid	8
12	(Spain) Nerea Eizagirre	Real Sociedad	8
12	(Switzerland) Sydney Schertenleib	Barcelona	8
12	(Spain) Isabel Corte	DUX Logroño	8
16	(Spain) Aitana Bonmatí	Barcelona	7
16	(Norway) Emilie Nautnes	Madrid CFF	7
16	(Spain) Carlota Suárez	Tenerife	7
16	(Brazil) Luany	Atlético Madrid	7
16	(Spain) Alba Redondo	Real Madrid	7
16	(Spain) Ane Azkona	Athletic Club	7
22	(Spain) Amaiur Sarriegi	Atlético Madrid	6
22	(Guatemala) Andrea Álvarez	Sevilla	6
22	(Paraguay) Lice Chamorro	Badalona Women	6
22	(The Gambia) Fatou Kanteh	Sevilla	6
22	(Spain) Laura Maria Pérez	Granada	6
22	(Uruguay) Esperanza Pizarro	Deportivo Abanca	6
22	(Spain) Aiara Agirrezabala	Real Sociedad	6
22	(Spain) Salma Paralluelo	Barcelona	6
22	(Spain) Itziar Pinillos	Badalona Women	6
22	(Spain) Carla Julià	Barcelona	6
22	(France) Claire Lavogez	Real Sociedad	6
22	(Spain) Ainhoa Marín	Deportivo Abanca	6
22	(Netherlands) Esmee Brugts	Barcelona	6
22	(Spain) Anita Marcos	Madrid CFF	6
22	(Azerbaijan) Yaiza Relea	Alhama	6
22	(Spain) Lucía Pardo	Real Sociedad	6
22	(Spain) Athenea del Castillo	Real Madrid	6
22	(Spain) Daniela Agote	Athletic Club	6

=== Assists ===
As of 31 May 2026

Rank	Player	Team	Assists
1	(Norway) Caroline Graham Hansen	Barcelona	10
1	(Brazil) Luany	Atlético Madrid	10
3	(Portugal) Kika Nazareth	Barcelona	9
3	(Spain) Vicky López	Barcelona	9
3	(Spain) Athenea del Castillo	Real Madrid	9
6	(Spain) Mapi León	Barcelona	7
6	(Spain) Alexia Putellas	Barcelona	7
6	(Spain) Laura Maria Pérez	Granada	7
6	(Spain) Eva Navarro	Real Madrid	7
6	(Spain) Isabel Corte	DUX Logroño	7
6	(Norway) Kamilla Melgård	Madrid CFF	7
12	(Spain) Aïcha Cámara	Barcelona	6
13	(Spain) Clàudia Pina	Barcelona	5
13	(Spain) Ainhoa Marín	Deportivo Abanca	5
13	(Scotland) Caroline Weir	Real Madrid	5
13	(Spain) Salma Paralluelo	Barcelona	5
13	(Poland) Ewa Pajor	Barcelona	5
13	(Spain) Patri Guijarro	Barcelona	5
13	(Spain) Fiamma Benítez	Atlético Madrid	5
13	(Spain) Natalia Ramos	Tenerife	5
13	(Spain) Carla Julià	Barcelona	5
13	(Spain) Emma Ramírez	Real Sociedad	5
13	(Spain) Violeta Quiles	Tenerife	5

=== Hat-tricks ===
Player	For	Against	Result	Date	Round
(Spain) Clàudia Pina	Barcelona	Alhama	8–0 (H)	30 August 2025	1
(Spain) Clàudia Pina	Barcelona	Sevilla	0–5 (A)	21 September 2025	4
(Spain) Ane Azkona	Athletic Club	Granada	1–5 (A)	22 November 2025	12
(Spain) Edna Imade	Real Sociedad	Atlético Madrid	5–5 (A)	10 January 2026	15
(Poland) Ewa Pajor^{4}	Barcelona	Madrid CFF	12–1 (H)	10 January 2026	15
(Spain) Amaiur Sarriegi	Atlético Madrid	DUX Logroño	5–0 (H)	14 March 2026	22
(Scotland) Caroline Weir	Real Madrid	Badalona Women	0–4 (A)	26 May 2026	29
(Spain) Anita Marcos^{4}	Madrid CFF	Granada	3–4 (A)	26 May 2026	29
(Norway) Caroline Graham Hansen	Barcelona	Madrid CFF	0–4 (A)	31 May 2026	30

(H) – Home; (A) – Away
^{4} – Player scored four goals.

=== Goalkeepers' Goals-to-Games Ratio ===
As of 31 May 2026, only includes players with at least 10 games played.

Rank	Name	Club	Matches	Goals Against	Average
1	(Spain) Gemma Font	Barcelona	12	3	0.25
2	(Spain) Cata Coll	Barcelona	17	6	0.35
3	(Spain) Misa Rodríguez	Real Madrid	19	11	0.57
4	(Spain) Noelia Ramos	Tenerife	15	9	0.60
5	(Germany) Merle Frohms	Real Madrid	11	7	0.63
6	(Chile) Antonia Canales	Badalona Women	13	11	0.84
7	(Spain) Julia Arrula	Real Sociedad	22	19	0.86
8	(Venezuela) Nayluisa Cáceres	Tenerife	14	13	0.92
9	(Spain) Lola Gallardo	Atlético Madrid	26	34	1.30
10	(Spain) Adriana Nanclares	Athletic Club	28	38	1.35

=== Clean sheets ===
As of 31 May 2026

Rank	Player	Club	Clean sheets
1	(Spain) Misa Rodríguez	Real Madrid	14
2	(Spain) Cata Coll	Barcelona	11
2	(Spain) Adriana Nanclares	Athletic Club	11
2	(Spain) Julia Arrula	Real Sociedad	11
5	(Spain) Esther Sullastres	Sevilla	10
5	(Spain) Lola Gallardo	Atlético Madrid	10
7	(Spain) Gemma Font	Barcelona	9
7	(Spain) Noelia Ramos	Tenerife	9

=== Scoring ===
- First goal of the season:
  (Chile) Sonya Keefe for Granada against Levante (30 August 2025)
- Last goal of the season:
  (Spain) Vicky López for Barcelona against Madrid CFF (31 May 2026)

=== Discipline ===
	Most yellow cards	Total	Most red cards	Total	Ref.
Player	(Spain) Ana Velázquez (Alhama)	11	(Spain) María Llompart (Badalona Women)	2	
Club	Espanyol	62	Atlético Madrid	4	

== Awards ==
=== Monthly awards ===
Month	Player of the Month		Reference
Month	Player	Club	Reference
September	(Brazil) Luany	Atlético Madrid	
October	(Spain) Edna Imade	Real Sociedad	
November	(Spain) Clàudia Pina	Barcelona	
December	(Poland) Ewa Pajor	Barcelona	
January	(Spain) Athenea del Castillo	Real Madrid	
February	(Spain) Lucía Moral	Sevilla	
March	(Spain) Amaiur Sarriegi	Atlético Madrid	
April	(Spain) Natalia Ramos	Tenerife	
May	(Spain) Clàudia Pina	Barcelona	

=== Annual awards ===
EA SPORTS Team of the Season
Pos.	Player	Club	Rating
GK	(Spain) Noelia Ramos	Tenerife	92
DF	(Spain) Ona Batlle	Barcelona	94
DF	(Spain) María Méndez	Real Madrid	93
MF	(Spain) Alexia Putellas	Barcelona	96
MF	(Spain) Fiamma Benítez	Atlético Madrid	96
MF	(Scotland) Caroline Weir	Real Madrid	95
MF	(Netherlands) Esmee Brugts	Barcelona	94
MF	(Spain) Paula Fernández	Real Sociedad	93
MF	(Uruguay) Esperanza Pizarro	Deportivo Abanca	92
FW	(Spain) Clàudia Pina	Barcelona	97
FW	(Spain) Athenea del Castillo	Real Madrid	95
FW	(Poland) Ewa Pajor	Barcelona	94
FW	(Spain) Daniela Agote	Athletic Club	91
FW	(Spain) Isina Corte	DUX Logroño	90

== Number of teams by autonomous community ==
Rank	Autonomous Community	Number	Teams
1	(Basque Country (autonomous community)) Basque	3	Athletic Club, Eibar and Real Sociedad
1	Catalonia	3	Barcelona, Espanyol and Badalona Women
1	(Community of Madrid) Madrid	3	Atlético Madrid, Madrid and Real Madrid
4	Andalusia	2	Granada and Sevilla
5	Canary Islands	1	Tenerife
5	(Galicia (Spain)) Galicia	1	Deportivo La Coruña
5	La Rioja	1	DUX Logroño
5	(Region of Murcia) Murcia	1	Alhama
5	(Valencian Community) Valencia	1	Levante

== See also ==
- 2025–26 Primera Federación
- 2025–26 Copa de la Reina de Fútbol
- 2025–26 Supercopa de España Femenina
- 2025–26 UEFA Women's Champions League
