= 2024–25 Liga F =

Spanish women's football league season

Liga F
- Season: 2024–25
- Dates: 6 September 2024 – 18 May 2025
- Champions: Barcelona (10th title)
- Relegated: Valencia; Real Betis
- Champions League: Barcelona; Real Madrid; Atlético Madrid
- Matches: 240
- Goals: 677 (2.82 per match)
- Top goalscorer: Ewa Pajor (25) Barcelona
- Biggest home win: Barcelona 10–1 Granada; 28 September 2024
- Biggest away win: Real Betis 0–9 Barcelona; 11 May 2025
- Highest scoring: Barcelona 10–1 Granada; 28 September 2024; Real Betis 0–9 Barcelona; 11 May 2025
- Longest winning run: Barcelona (16 matches)
- Longest unbeaten run: Barcelona (16 matches)
- Longest winless run: Valencia (12 matches)
- Longest losing run: Deportivo Abanca (6 matches)
- Highest attendance: 35,812; Barcelona 1–3 Real Madrid; 23 March 2025

The 2024-25 Primera División Femenina de Fútbol season, branded as Liga F, was the 37th edition of the Primera División Femenina de España de fútbol. The tournament was organised by the Liga Profesional Femenina de Fútbol (LPFF).

Barcelona were the defending champions after winning the previous edition unbeaten (29 wins, one draw).

Barcelona were again crowned champions, winning their sixth title in a row and their tenth title overall. However, unlike in the previous season, Barcelona did not go invincible, having lost two league games (both home games, one to Levante and one to Real Madrid).

The competition started on 8 September 2024, and ended on 18 May 2025. This means that the season ended before both the 2024–25 UEFA Women's Champions League and 2024–25 Copa de la Reina de Fútbol. Despite the shortened season, there were no midweek matches.

== Summary ==
The draw for the league was held on 19 August 2024, less than a month before it was set to begin.

== Teams ==
=== Changes from 2023–24 season ===
At the end of the 2023–24 season, Deportivo Abanca and Espanyol were promoted to Liga F, taking the places of Sporting de Huelva and Villarreal, who were relegated.

=== Stadiums and locations ===
Team	Home city	Stadium	Capacity
Athletic Club	Bilbao	Lezama 2	3,200
Atlético Madrid	Alcalá de Henares (Madrid)	Centro Deportivo Wanda	2,700
Barcelona	Sant Joan Despí (Barcelona)	Johan Cruyff Stadium	6,000
Deportivo Abanca	A Coruña	Cidade Deportiva de Abegondo	1,000
Eibar	Eibar	Ipurua	8,164
Espanyol	Sant Adrià de Besòs (Barcelona)	Ciutat Esportiva Dani Jarque	1,520
Granada	Granada	Ciudad Deportiva del Granada CF	600
Levante	Valencia	Ciudad Deportiva de Buñol	3,000
Levante Badalona	Badalona (Barcelona)	Estadi Municipal de Badalona	4,170
Madrid CFF	Fuenlabrada (Madrid)	Estadio Fernando Torres	6,000
Real Betis	Seville	Estadio Luis del Sol	1,300
Real Madrid	Madrid	Alfredo Di Stéfano Stadium	6,000
Real Sociedad	San Sebastián	Campo José Luis Orbegozo	2,500
Sevilla	Seville	Estadio Jesús Navas	8,000
UD Tenerife	Adeje	Campo Municipal de Adeje	1,200
Valencia	Valencia	Estadio Antonio Puchades	3,000

=== Personnel and sponsorship ===
Team	Head coach	Captain	Kit manufacturer	Main shirt sponsor
Athletic Club	(Spain) David Aznar	(Spain) Irene Oguiza	Castore	Kosner
Atlético Madrid	(Spain) Víctor Martín	(Spain) Lola Gallardo	Nike	Herbalife
Barcelona	(Spain) Pere Romeu	(Spain) Alexia Putellas	Nike	Spotify
Deportivo Abanca	(Spain) Fran Alonso	(Spain) Cris Martínez	Kappa	Abanca
Eibar	(Spain) Yerai Martín	(Spain) Arene Altonaga	Hummel	Smartlog Group
Espanyol	(Spain) Sara Monforte	(Spain) Carol Marín	Kelme	Área Jurídica Global
Granada	(Spain) Arturo Ruiz	(Spain) Lauri	Adidas	Wiber
Levante	(Spain) Santi Trigero	(Spain) Alharilla	Macron	Digital Menta
Levante Badalona	(Spain) Ana Junyent	(Spain) Mari Paz Vilas	Hummel	None
Madrid CFF	(Spain) Juanjo Vila	(Spain) Paola Ulloa	Adidas	Thermor
Real Betis	(Spain) Juan Rojo	(Spain) Nuria Ligero	Hummel	Social Energy
Real Madrid	(Spain) Alberto Toril	(Spain) Olga Carmona	Adidas	Emirates
Real Sociedad	(Spain) Sánchez Vera	(Spain) Nerea Eizagirre	Macron	Halcón Viajes
Sevilla	(Spain) David Losada	(Spain) Amanda Sampedro	Castore	Social Energy
UD Tenerife	(Spain) Eder Maestre	(Spain) Pisco	Hummel	Tenerife! Despierta emociones
Valencia	(Argentina) Cristian Toro	(Spain) Marta Carro	Puma	TM Grupo Inmobiliario

=== Managerial changes ===
Team	Outgoing manager	Manner of departure	Date of vacancy	Position in table	Incoming manager	Date of appointment
Valencia	(Spain) José Luis Bravo	Sacked	22 November 2024	16th	(Argentina) Cristian Toro	28 November 2024
Deportivo Abanca	(Spain) Irene Ferreras	Sacked	23 November 2024	15th	(Spain) Fran Alonso	24 November 2024
Levante	(Spain) Roger Lamesa	Sacked	10 January 2025	14th	(Spain) Ángel Saiz	3 February 2025
Real Betis	(Spain) Joseba Agirre	Sacked	1 April 2025	15th	(Spain) Juan Rojo Rodríguez	1 April 2025
Levante Badalona	(Spain) Ferrán Cabello	Sacked	16 April 2025	13th	(Spain) Ana Junyent	16 April 2025

== League table ==
=== Standings ===
Pos	Team	Pld	W	D	L	GF	GA	GD	Pts	Qualification or relegation
1	Barcelona (C)	30	28	0	2	128	16	+112	84	Qualification for the Champions League league phase
2	Real Madrid	30	24	4	2	87	28	+59	76	Qualification for the Champions League third qualifying round
3	Atlético Madrid	30	16	10	4	49	23	+26	58	Qualification for the Champions League third qualifying round
4	Athletic Club	30	16	3	11	40	32	+8	51	
5	Granada	30	14	3	13	42	45	−3	45	
6	UD Tenerife	30	11	9	10	40	36	+4	42	
7	Real Sociedad	30	12	5	13	40	45	−5	41	
8	Eibar	30	10	8	12	24	41	−17	38	
9	Sevilla	30	10	6	14	32	47	−15	36	
10	Madrid CFF	30	9	6	15	37	62	−25	33	
11	Espanyol	30	7	11	12	29	50	−21	32	
12	Levante	30	8	7	15	30	45	−15	31	
13	Levante Badalona	30	6	10	14	24	45	−21	28	
14	Deportivo Abanca	30	6	9	15	27	48	−21	27	
15	Real Betis (R)	30	6	5	19	24	67	−43	23	Relegation to Primera Federación
16	Valencia (R)	30	5	8	17	24	47	−23	23	Relegation to Primera Federación

Source: LigaF.es
Rules for classification: 1) Points; 2) Head-to-head points; 3) Goal difference; 4) Number of goals scored
(C) Champions; (R) Relegated

=== Results ===
Home \ Away	ATH	ATM	BAR	DPA	EIB	ESP	GRA	LEV	LBA	MAD	BET	RMA	RSO	SEV	UDT	VAL
Athletic Club		0–2	0–2	2–0	0–1	1–0	2–1	2–3	1–0	1–0	3–0	1–2	2–0	0–1	2–0	1–1
Atlético Madrid	1–0		0–3	2–1	1–1	1–1	2–0	3–0	5–0	4–0	0–0	1–2	1–0	1–0	2–0	3–0
Barcelona	6–0	6–0		4–0	4–0	7–1	10–1	1–2	6–0	5–1	4–1	1–3	3–1	5–1	5–1	4–1
Deportivo Abanca	2–2	0–0	0–3		0–1	0–1	1–2	1–0	3–1	1–0	0–0	1–4	0–1	1–1	0–0	1–1
Eibar	1–2	0–2	1–8	0–0		1–1	0–0	0–3	1–0	1–2	2–0	0–3	1–1	0–3	0–0	2–0
Espanyol	1–2	0–0	0–2	1–1	2–1		1–0	1–0	2–0	3–3	6–2	0–5	0–3	0–0	0–0	1–0
Granada	0–2	0–0	0–2	5–0	2–0	2–1		0–1	1–1	1–0	1–2	1–2	0–2	3–0	2–1	2–1
Levante	0–1	2–2	1–4	1–0	1–2	1–1	2–3		1–1	0–0	1–2	1–2	1–2	0–0	2–0	0–1
Levante Badalona	0–1	1–1	0–2	2–1	0–1	1–1	0–2	2–0		1–0	2–1	1–3	0–0	0–0	0–0	1–1
Madrid CFF	1–1	0–3	1–8	4–3	2–1	2–1	3–1	2–1	1–2		2–0	0–1	0–2	2–1	2–1	1–1
Real Betis	0–4	2–1	0–9	0–2	0–1	0–0	1–3	1–2	4–3	1–1		0–3	3–1	1–1	0–1	0–1
Real Madrid	2–0	1–1	0–4	2–2	0–1	5–0	3–1	6–0	3–2	7–3	5–1		3–0	4–1	1–1	1–0
Real Sociedad	1–0	0–2	0–6	1–2	0–0	4–1	4–2	1–2	2–1	2–2	4–0	1–4		0–0	2–0	0–2
Sevilla	2–5	1–2	0–1	2–1	1–3	1–0	0–2	2–0	0–1	2–1	2–0	0–4	3–2		0–2	3–1
UD Tenerife	2–1	2–2	0–2	5–1	1–1	4–1	1–2	0–0	1–1	2–0	2–0	1–4	4–1	4–1		2–0
Valencia	0–1	0–4	0–1	0–2	2–0	1–1	0–2	1–1	1–1	4–1	0–2	2–2	0–2	1–3	1–2	

Updated to match(es) played on 18 May 2025. Source: Liga F
Legend: Blue = home team win; Yellow = draw; Red = away team win.

=== Positions by round ===
The table lists the positions of teams after each week of matches. In order to preserve chronological evolvements, any postponed matches are not included to the round at which they were originally scheduled, but added to the full round they were played immediately afterwards.

Team ╲ Round	1	2	3	4	5	6	7	8	9	10	11	12	13	14	15	16	17	18	19	20	21	22	23	24	25	26	27	28	29	30
Barcelona	2	2	3	1	1	1	1	1	1	1	1	1	1	1	1	1	1	1	1	1	1	1	1	1	1	1	1	1	1	1
Real Madrid	1	1	1	2	2	2	2	3	2	3	3	2	2	2	2	2	2	2	2	2	2	2	2	2	2	2	2	2	2	2
Atlético Madrid	3	4	2	3	3	3	3	2	3	2	2	3	3	3	3	3	4	3	4	3	3	3	3	3	3	3	3	3	3	3
Athletic Club	7	6	7	5	8	6	6	7	5	7	5	5	4	4	5	5	5	4	3	4	4	4	4	4	4	4	4	4	4	4
Granada	13	12	9	12	13	10	11	9	10	11	9	8	6	7	6	7	7	7	7	6	6	6	5	5	5	5	5	5	5	5
UD Tenerife	11	8	8	10	6	7	8	6	7	5	7	6	7	6	7	6	6	6	6	7	7	7	7	6	6	6	6	6	7	6
Real Sociedad	10	11	10	6	5	5	5	5	4	4	4	4	5	5	4	4	3	5	5	5	5	5	6	7	7	7	7	7	6	7
Eibar	4	3	5	8	9	9	9	11	12	13	13	13	12	13	12	12	10	11	10	11	9	9	8	8	8	8	8	9	9	8
Sevilla	5	9	11	7	7	8	7	8	8	10	8	11	13	11	8	8	9	10	8	8	8	8	9	9	9	9	9	8	8	9
Madrid CFF	6	5	6	9	10	11	12	12	9	8	11	10	10	9	9	10	11	9	11	12	11	10	10	10	10	10	10	11	10	10
Espanyol	16	16	14	15	11	14	15	14	11	9	10	9	8	8	11	11	12	13	14	13	13	13	11	12	12	11	11	10	11	11
Levante	12	13	16	11	12	12	13	12	14	12	14	14	14	14	15	15	15	15	15	15	15	14	14	14	14	12	12	13	13	12
Levante Badalona	8	7	4	4	4	4	4	4	6	6	6	7	9	10	10	9	8	8	9	9	10	11	12	11	13	14	14	12	12	13
Deportivo Abanca	15	14	12	13	14	13	10	13	13	15	15	15	15	15	14	13	13	12	12	10	12	12	13	13	11	13	13	14	14	14
Real Betis	14	15	13	14	15	15	14	10	13	14	12	12	11	12	13	14	14	14	13	14	14	15	15	15	15	15	15	15	15	15
Valencia	9	10	15	16	16	16	16	16	16	16	16	16	16	16	16	16	16	16	16	16	16	16	16	16	16	16	16	16	16	16

Leader and Champions League league stage
Champions League qualifying round 2
Champions League qualifying round 2
Relegation to Primera Federación
Relegation to Primera Federación

Updated to match(es) played on 18 May 2025. Source: Liga F

== Season statistics ==
=== Goalscorers ===
Rank	Player	Team	Goals
1	(Poland) Ewa Pajor	Barcelona	25
2	(Spain) Edna Imade	Granada	16
2	(Spain) Alexia Putellas	Barcelona	16
4	(Spain) Alba Redondo	Real Madrid	15
5	(Denmark) Signe Bruun	Real Madrid	12
5	(Spain) Aitana Bonmatí	Barcelona	12
7	(Norway) Caroline Graham Hansen	Barcelona	11
7	(Poland) Natalia Padilla	Sevilla	11
7	(Colombia) Ivonne Chacón	Levante	11
10	(Nigeria) Gift Monday	Tenerife	10
10	(Spain) Amaiur Sarriegi	Real Sociedad	10
10	(Spain) Vicky López	Barcelona	10
10	(Scotland) Caroline Weir	Real Madrid	10
10	(Nigeria) Rinsola Babajide	Tenerife	10
10	(Spain) Clàudia Pina	Barcelona	10
16	(Norway) Emilie Nautnes	Madrid CFF	9
17	(Spain) Patricia Guijarro	Barcelona	7
17	(Paraguay) Lice Chamorro	Espanyol	7
17	(Spain) Salma Paralluelo	Barcelona	7
17	(Colombia) Linda Caicedo	Real Madrid	7
17	(Nigeria) Rasheedat Ajibade	Atlético Madrid	7

=== Assists ===
Rank	Player	Team	Assists
1	(Spain) Alexia Putellas	Barcelona	11
2	(Norway) Caroline Graham Hansen	Barcelona	10
3	(Spain) Laura Pérez	Granada	9
3	(Poland) Ewa Pajor	Barcelona	9
3	(Spain) Fiamma Benítez	Atlético Madrid	9
6	(Scotland) Caroline Weir	Real Madrid	8
6	(Spain) Patricia Guijarro	Barcelona	8
6	(Spain) Ona Batlle	Barcelona	8
9	(Denmark) Signe Bruun	Real Madrid	7
9	(Spain) Clàudia Pina	Barcelona	7
11	(Portugal) Andreia Jacinto	Real Sociedad	6
11	(Spain) Aitana Bonmatí	Barcelona	6
11	(France) Sandie Toletti	Real Madrid	6
11	(Spain) Ainhoa Marín	Deportivo Abanca	6
11	(Spain) Nerea Nevado	Athletic Club	6
11	(Brazil) Gio Queiroz	Atlético Madrid	6
11	(Spain) Mapi León	Barcelona	6

=== Hat-tricks ===
Player	For	Against	Result	Date	Round
(Nigeria) Rasheedat Ajibade	Atlético Madrid	Madrid CFF	4–0 (H)	27 September 2024	4
(Poland) Ewa Pajor	Barcelona	Granada	10–1 (H)	28 September 2024	4
(Poland) Ewa Pajor	Barcelona	Espanyol	7–1 (H)	13 October 2024	6
(Poland) Ewa Pajor	Barcelona	Real Sociedad	6–0 (A)	5 January 2025	16
(Spain) Clàudia Pina	Barcelona	Real Betis	9–0 (A)	11 May 2025	29
(Norway) Emilie Nautnes	Madrid CFF	Deportivo Abanca	4–3 (H)	18 May 2025	30

(H) – Home; (A) – Away
^{4} – Player scored four goals.

=== Goalkeepers' Goals-to-Games Ratio ===
Rank	Name	Club	Matches	Goals Against	Average
1	(Spain) Cata Coll	Barcelona	22	11	0.5
2	(Spain) Lola Gallardo	Atlético de Madrid	27	23	0.85
3	(Spain) Adriana Nanclares	Athletic Club	29	26	0.9
4	(Spain) Misa Rodríguez	Real Madrid	24	23	0.96
5	(Spain) Noelia Ramos	UD Tenerife	29	31	1.06

=== Clean sheets ===
Rank	Player	Club	Clean sheets
1	(Spain) Lola Gallardo	Atlético Madrid	15
2	(Spain) Adriana Nanclares	Athletic Club	12
2	(Spain) Cata Coll	Barcelona	12
4	(Spain) Elene Lete	Real Sociedad	10
4	(Spain) Noelia Ramos	Tenerife	10
6	(Portugal) Inês Pereira	Deportivo Abanca	8
6	(Spain) Misa Rodríguez	Real Madrid	8
6	(France) Romane Salvador	Espanyol	8
6	(Spain) Esther Sullastres	Sevilla	8
10	(Spain) Maria Miralles	Eibar	7

=== Scoring ===
- First goal of the season:
  (Spain) María Méndez for Real Madrid against Espanyol (6 September 2024)
- Last goal of the season:
  (Spain) Paula Fernández for Levante against Granada (18 May 2025)

=== Discipline ===
Player

- Most yellow cards: 10
  - (Portugal) Alice Marques (Valencia)
  - (Uruguay) Cinthia González (Sevilla)
- Most red cards: 2
  - (Spain) Mar Torras (Espanyol)

Team

- Most yellow cards: 69
  - Real Betis
- Fewest yellow cards: 21
  - Barcelona
- Most red cards: 4
  - Levante
  - Espanyol
  - Sevilla
- Fewest red cards: 0
  - Madrid CFF
  - Real Madrid
  - Barcelona

== Awards ==
=== Monthly awards ===
Month	Player of the Month		Reference
Month	Player	Club	Reference
September	(Nigeria) Rasheedat Ajibade	Atlético Madrid	
October	(Spain) Alexia Putellas	Barcelona	
November	(Spain) Patri Guijarro	Barcelona	
December	(Spain) Edna Imade	Granada	
January	(Colombia) Linda Caicedo	Real Madrid	
February	(Nigeria) Gift Monday	Tenerife	
March	(Brazil) Gio Queiroz	Atlético Madrid	
April	(Poland) Ewa Pajor	Barcelona	
May	(Spain) Clàudia Pina	Barcelona	

=== Annual awards ===
EA SPORTS Team of the Season
Pos.	Player	Club
GK	(Portugal) **Inês Pereira**	Deportivo Abanca
DF	(Spain) **Ona Batlle**	Barcelona
DF	(France) **Maëlle Lakrar**	Real Madrid
DF	(Spain) **Alexia Fernández**	Granada
MF	(Spain) **Alexia Putellas**	Barcelona
MF	(Spain) **Aitana Bonmatí**	Barcelona
MF	(Colombia) **Linda Caicedo**	Real Madrid
MF	(Scotland) **Caroline Weir**	Real Madrid
MF	(Sweden) Filippa Angeldahl	Real Madrid
MF	(Norway) Vilde Bøe Risa	Atlético Madrid
MF	(France) Claire Lavogez	Real Sociedad
FW	(Norway) **Caroline Graham Hansen**	Barcelona
FW	(Spain) **Edna Imade**	Granada
FW	(Poland) **Ewa Pajor**	Barcelona

Players not in bold are honourable mentions.

== Number of teams by autonomous community ==
Rank	Autonomous Community	Number	Teams
1	Andalusia	3	Betis, Granada, Sevilla
1	(Basque Country (autonomous community)) Basque Country	3	Athletic Club, Eibar, and Real Sociedad
1	Catalonia	3	Barcelona, Espanyol, and Levante Badalona
1	Community of Madrid	3	Atlético Madrid, Madrid CFF, and Real Madrid
5	Valencian Community	2	Levante, Valencia
6	Canary Islands	1	UD Tenerife
6	(Galicia (Spain)) Galicia	1	Deportivo Abanca

== See also ==
- 2024–25 Copa de la Reina de Fútbol
- 2024–25 Supercopa de España Femenina
- 2024–25 UEFA Women's Champions League
