= Andreia Jacinto =

Portuguese footballer (born 2002)

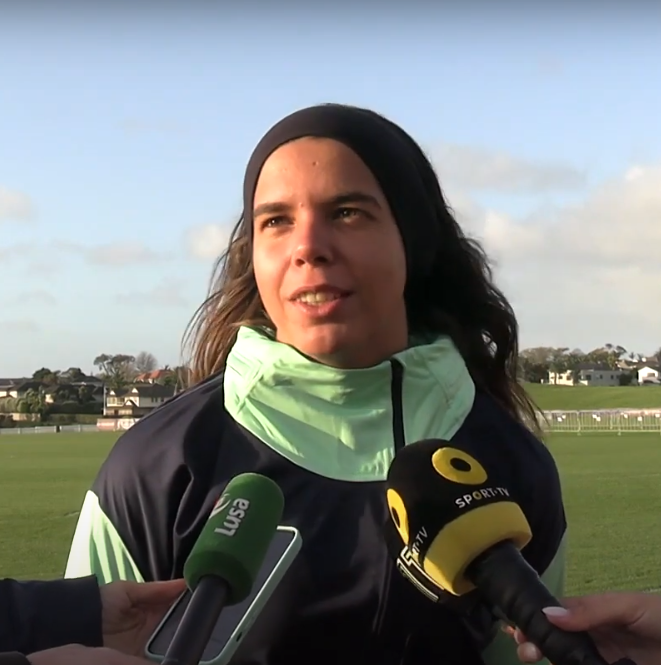
- Jacinto in 2023

Personal information
- Full name: Andreia de Jesus Jacinto
- Date of birth: 8 June 2002 (age 24)
- Place of birth: Cascais, Portugal
- Height: 1.77 m (5 ft 10 in)
- Position: Midfielder

Team information
- Current team: Real Madrid
- Number: 17

Senior career*
Years	Team	Apps	(Gls)
2019–2022	Sporting CP	41	(6)
2022–2026	Real Sociedad	112	(3)
2026–	Real Madrid	9	(0)

International career^{‡}
2017	Portugal U16	6	(0)
2017–2019	Portugal U17	23	(4)
2019–2020	Portugal U19	7	(1)
2020–	Portugal	61	(1)
- * Club domestic league appearances and goals as of 21:06, 6 November 2026 (UTC) ‡ National team caps and goals as of 21:06, 6 November 2026 (UTC)

Andreia de Jesus Jacinto (Portuguese: [ɐ̃ˈdɾɐj.ɐ dɨ ʒɨˈzu ʒɐˈsĩ.tu]; born 8 June 2002) is a Portuguese professional footballer who plays as a midfielder for Liga F club Real Madrid and the Portugal national team. She previously played for Campeonato Nacional Feminino (CNC) club Sporting CP and Liga F club Real Sociedad.

== Club career ==
=== Sporting CP ===
Jacinto first joined Sporting CP in 2016 and signed her first professional contract with the club on 25 September 2019, at the age of 17.

=== Real Sociedad ===
In June 2022, Jacinto signed for Real Sociedad. Over the following four seasons, she became an important member of the team and made over 100 appearances in all competitions.

On 29 May 2026, the club announced that she would depart at the conclusion of the 2025–26 season.

=== Real Madrid ===
On 14 June 2026, Jacinto joined Real Madrid on deal until 2030.

== International career ==
Jacinto made her debut for the Portugal national team on 7 March 2020 against Belgium in the 2020 Algarve Cup. On 30 May 2023, she was included in the 23-player squad for the FIFA Women's World Cup 2023.

On 24 June 2025, Jacinto was called up to the Portugal squad for the UEFA Women's Euro 2025.

== Career statistics ==
=== Club ===
As of match played 1 November 2026

Appearances and goals by club, season and competition
Club	Season	League			National cup (Note: Includes Taça de Portugal, Copa de la Reina)		League cup (Note: Includes Taça da Liga)		Continental		Other		Total	
Club	Season	Division	Apps	Goals	Apps	Goals	Apps	Goals	Apps	Goals	Apps	Goals	Apps	Goals
Sporting CP	2019–20	Campeonato Nacional	1	0	0	0	0	0	—		—		1	0
Sporting CP	2020–21	Campeonato Nacional	23	2	—		3	1	—		—		26	3
Sporting CP	2021–22	Campeonato Nacional	17	4	4	0	4	1	—		1 (Note: Appearance(s) in Supertaça de Portugal)	0	26	5
Sporting CP	Total		41	6	4	0	7	2	—		1	0	53	8
Real Sociedad	2022–23	Liga F	28	3	0	0	—		2 (Note: Appearance(s) in UEFA Women's Champions League)	0	1 (Note: Appearance(s) in Supercopa de España)	0	31	3
Real Sociedad	2023–24	Liga F	28	0	5	0	—		—		—		33	0
Real Sociedad	2024–25	Liga F	30	0	2	0	—		—		1	0	33	0
Real Sociedad	2025–26	Liga F	26	0	2	0	—		—		—		28	0
Real Sociedad	Total		112	3	9	0	—		2	0	2	0	125	3
Real Madrid	2026–27	Liga F	9	0	0	0	—		5	0	0	0	14	0
Career total			162	9	13	0	7	2	7	0	3	0	192	11

=== International ===
As of match played 9 June 2026

Appearances and goals by national team and year
National team	Year	Apps	Goals
Portugal	2020	3	0
Portugal	2021	10	0
Portugal	2022	9	0
Portugal	2023	13	1
Portugal	2024	10	0
Portugal	2025	13	0
Portugal	2026	3	0
Total		61	1

Scores and results list Portugal's goal tally first, score column indicates score after each Jacinto goal.

List of international goals scored by Andreia Jacinto
No.	Date	Venue	Opponent	Score	Result	Competition
1	26 September 2023	Estadio Cidade de Barcelos, Barcelos, Portugal	Norway	1–1	3–2	2023–24 UEFA Nations League
