= Edna Imade =

Spanish footballer (born 2000)

- Imade with Spain in 2026

Personal information
- Date of birth: 5 October 2000 (age 26)
- Place of birth: Morocco
- Height: 1.79 m (5 ft 10 in)
- Position: Forward

Team information
- Current team: Bayern Munich
- Number: 29

Senior career*
Years	Team	Apps	(Gls)
2019–2021	Málaga		
2021–2023	CP Cacereño		
2023–2025	Granada	57	(21)
2025–	Bayern Munich	20	(11)
2025–2026	→ Real Sociedad (loan)	12	(11)

International career^{‡}
2025–	Spain	9	(5)
- * Club domestic league appearances and goals as of 14 November 2026 ‡ National team caps and goals as of 21:00, 11 October 2026 (UTC)

Edna Imade (born 5 October 2000) is a professional footballer who plays as a forward for Frauen-Bundesliga club Bayern Munich. Born to Nigerian parents in Morocco, she plays for the Spain national team.

== Club career ==
In the summer of 2025, Imade signed a four-year contract with Bayern Munich who then loaned her to Liga F club Real Sociedad for the 2025–26 season. After Imade scored eleven goals in twelve matches, she was prematurely recalled to Bayern in January 2026.

== International career ==
Originally a Nigerian citizen, Imade became Spanish by naturalization on 19 November 2025. Two days later, she was called up to the Spain national team. She made her debut on 28 November 2025.

== Career statistics ==
=== International ===
As of 10 October 2026

Appearances and goals by national team and year
National team	Year	Apps	Goals
Spain	2025	2	0
Spain	2026	7	5
Total		9	5

As of match played 9 June 2026. Spain score listed first, score column indicates score after each Imade goal.

International goals by date, venue, opponent, score, result and competition
No.	Date	Venue	Opponent	Score	Result	Competition
1	3 March 2026	Estadio Municipal de Castalia, Castellón de la Plana, Spain	Iceland	3–0	3–0	2027 FIFA World Cup qualification
2	7 March 2026	Mardan Sports Complex, Antalya, Turkey	Ukraine	1–0	3–1	2027 FIFA World Cup qualification
3	18 April 2026	Estadio Nuevo Arcángel, Córdoba, Spain	Ukraine	1–0	5–0	2027 FIFA World Cup qualification
4	18 April 2026	Estadio Nuevo Arcángel, Córdoba, Spain	Ukraine	2–0	5–0	2027 FIFA World Cup qualification
5	9 June 2026	Laugardalsvöllur, Reykjavík, Iceland	Iceland	2–0	6–1	2027 FIFA World Cup qualification

== Honours ==
Spain

- UEFA Women's Nations League: 2025

Bayern Munich

- Bundesliga: 2025–26
- DFB-Pokal: 2025–26

Individual

- Liga F Player of the Month: December 2024, October 2025
