= Liga F Player of the Month =

Spanish association football award

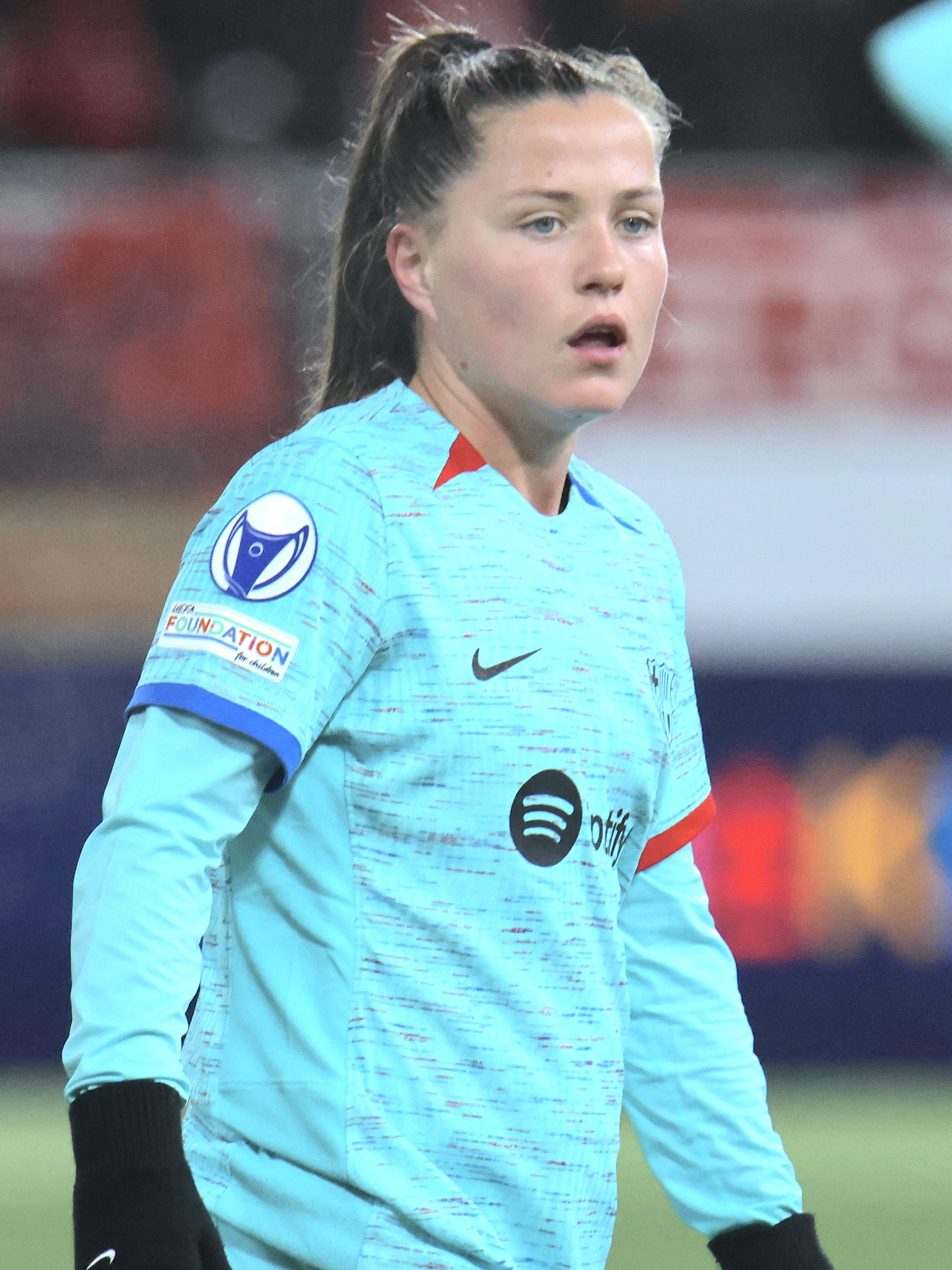
Clàudia Pina has won a record four Player of the Month awards.

The Player of the Month is an association football award that recognises the best Liga F player each month of the season. The award is sponsored by EA Sports FC, being the first one for a women's football league. It was introduced in September 2024, coinciding with the start of the 2024-25 season. Each month, seven players are nominated and can be chosen on an online public voting hosted by EA Sports.

The first award was assigned to Atlético Madrid player Rasheedat Ajibade for her performances in September 2024. Clàudia Pina, Ewa Pajor and Edna Imade are the only players to win the award multiple times. Barcelona players have won the award a record eight times.

== Winners ==
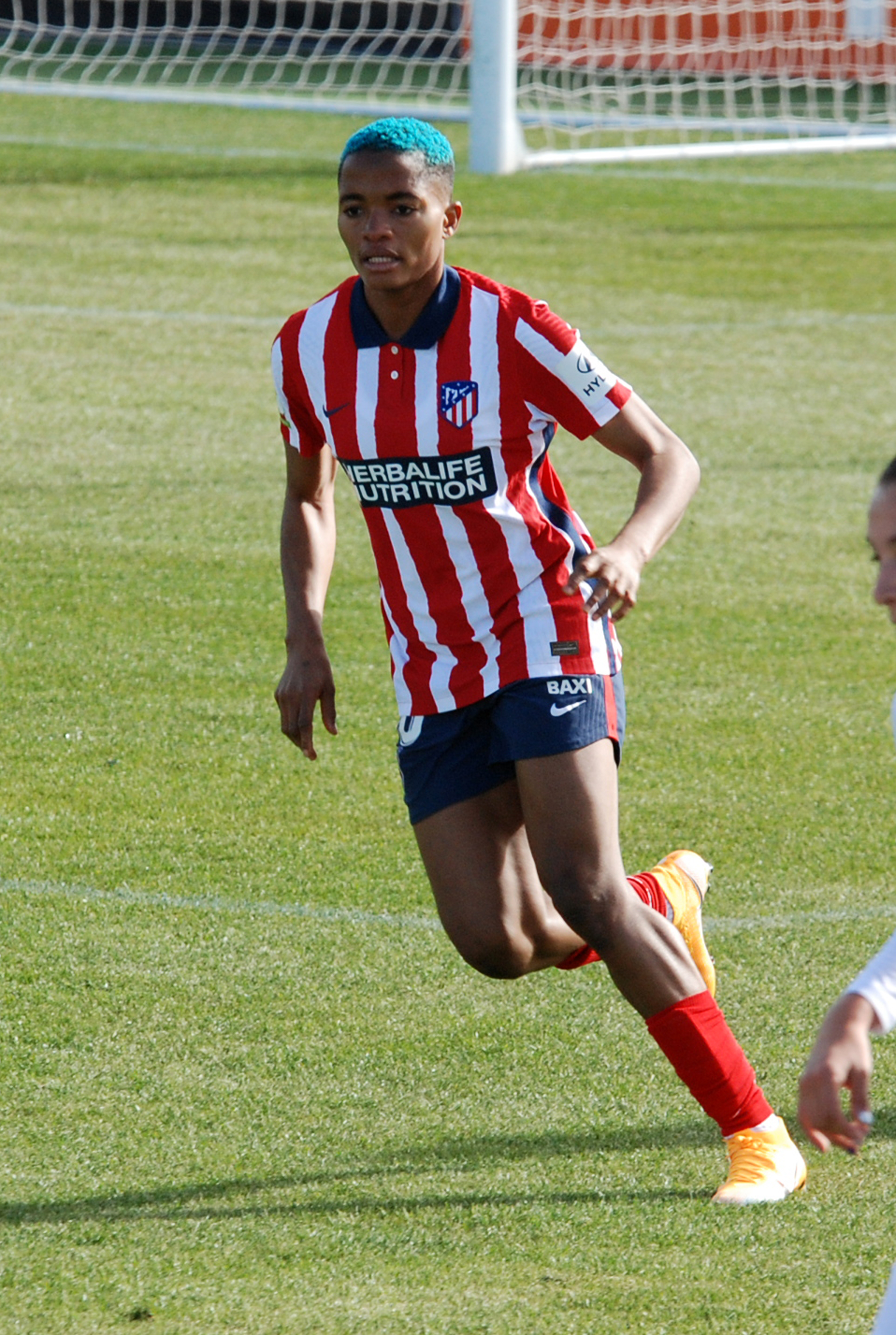
Rasheedat Ajibade won the first Player of the Month award in September 2024.

Month	Year (Note: Each year is linked to an article on the particular season associated with the month of that year.)	Player	Nationality	Pos.	Club	Ref.
September	2024	Rasheedat Ajibade	Nigeria	FW	Atlético Madrid	
October	2024	Alexia Putellas	Spain	MF	Barcelona	
November	2024	Patricia Guijarro	Spain	MF	Barcelona	
December	2024	Edna Imade	Spain	FW	Granada	
January	2025	Linda Caicedo	Colombia	FW	Real Madrid	
February	2025	Gift Monday	Nigeria	FW	UD Tenerife	
March	2025	Giovana Queiroz	Brazil	FW	Atlético Madrid	
April	2025	Ewa Pajor	Poland	FW	Barcelona	
May	2025	Clàudia Pina	Spain	FW	Barcelona	
September	2025	Luany	Brazil	MF	Atlético Madrid	
October	2025	Edna Imade	Spain	FW	Real Sociedad	
November	2025	Clàudia Pina	Spain	FW	Barcelona	
December	2025	Ewa Pajor	Poland	FW	Barcelona	
January	2026	Athenea del Castillo	Spain	FW	Real Madrid	
February	2026	Lucía Moral	Spain	FW	Sevilla	
March	2026	Amaiur Sarriegi	Spain	FW	Atlético Madrid	
April	2026	Natalia Ramos	Spain	MF	Tenerife	
May	2026	Clàudia Pina	Spain	FW	Barcelona	
September	2026	Clàudia Pina	Spain	FW	Barcelona	
October	2026	Ainhoa Marín	Spain	FW	Real Sociedad	

== Multiple winners ==
The following table lists the number of awards won by players who have won at least two Player of the Month awards.

Players in bold are still active in Liga F.

Rank	Player	Wins
1	(Spain) **Clàudia Pina**	4
2	(Spain) Edna Imade	2
2	(Poland) **Ewa Pajor**	2

== Awards won by nationality ==
As of 10 November 2026

Nationality	Players	Wins
Spain	9	13
Nigeria	2	2
Brazil	2	2
Poland	1	2
Colombia	1	1

== Awards won by position ==
As of 10 November 2026

Position	Players	Wins
Forward	11	16
Midfielder	4	4

== Awards won by club ==
As of 10 November 2026

Club	Players	Wins
Barcelona	4	8
Atlético Madrid	4	4
Real Madrid	2	2
UD Tenerife	2	2
Real Sociedad	2	2
Granada	1	1
Sevilla	1	1
