= Clàudia Pina =

Spanish footballer (born 2001)

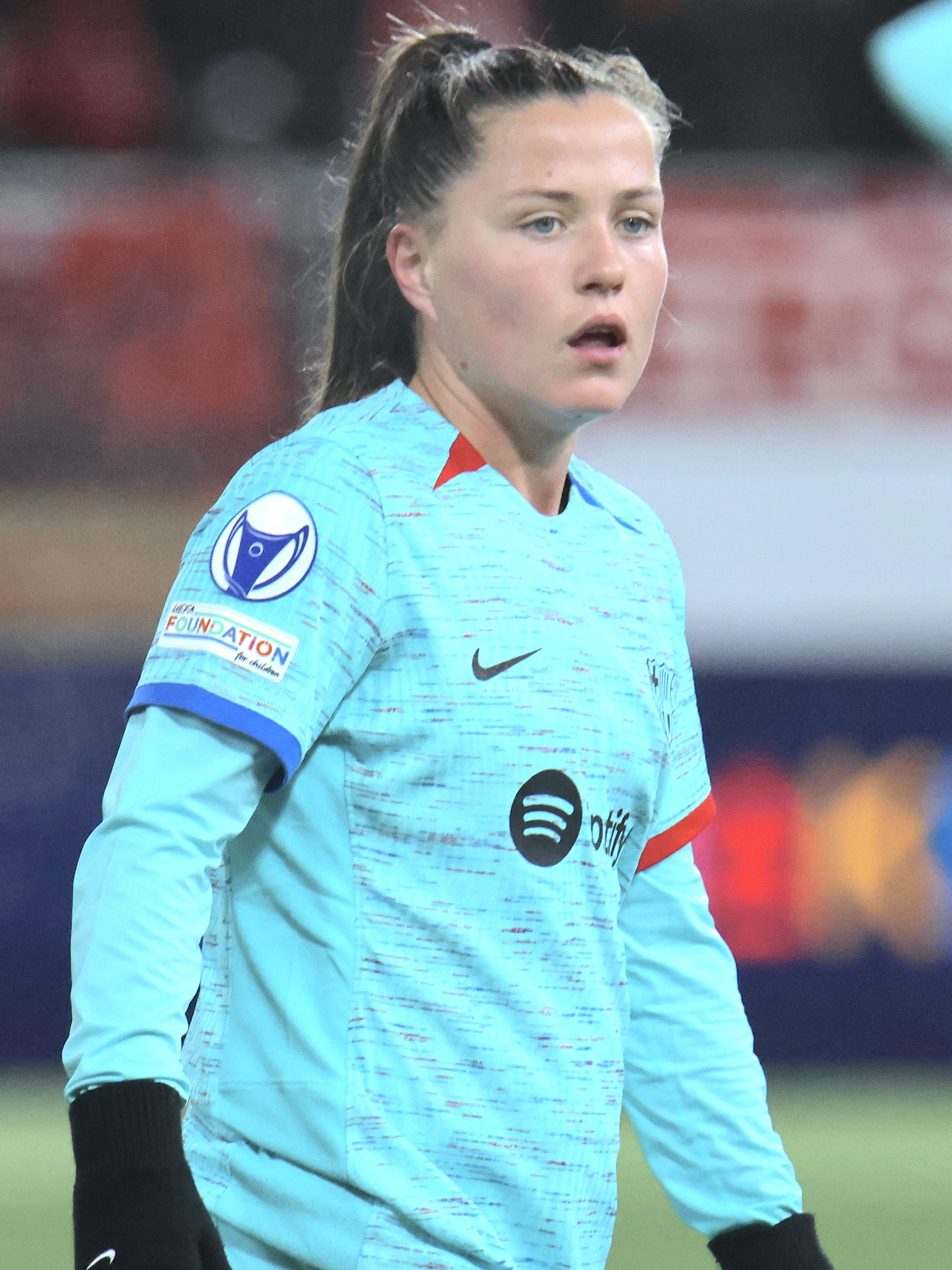
- Pina with Barcelona in 2023

Personal information
- Full name: Clàudia Pina Medina
- Date of birth: 12 August 2001 (age 25)
- Place of birth: Montcada i Reixac, Spain
- Height: 1.60 m (5 ft 3 in)
- Positions: Striker; left winger; attacking midfielder

Team information
- Current team: Barcelona
- Number: 9

Youth career
- 2011–2013: Espanyol
- 2013–2014: Barcelona

Senior career*
| Years | Team | Apps | (Gls) |
| 2016–2020 | Barcelona B | 16+ | (15+) |
| 2018– | Barcelona | 149 | (80) |
| 2020–2021 | → Sevilla (loan) | 34 | (9) |

International career^{‡}
| 2016–2019 | Spain U17 | 29 | (35) |
| 2018–2022 | Spain U20 | 5 | (1) |
| 2019 | Spain U19 | 8 | (7) |
| 2021 | Spain U23 | 1 | (0) |
| 2021– | Spain | 29 | (16) |
Medal record
Women's football
Representing Spain
UEFA Women's Championship
| Runner-up | 2025 Switzerland |
FIFA U-20 Women's World Cup
| Runner-up | 2018 France |
FIFA U-17 Women's World Cup
| Winner | 2018 Uruguay |
| Third place | 2016 Jordan |
UEFA Women's Under-17 Championship
| Runner-up | 2017 Czech Republic |
- * Club domestic league appearances and goals as of 14:42, 11 October 2026 (UTC) ‡ National team caps and goals as of 04:30, 6 June 2026 (UTC)

Clàudia Pina Medina (born 12 August 2001) is a Spanish professional footballer who plays as a forward for Liga F club FC Barcelona and the Spain national team.

== Club career ==
Pina was formerly a futsal player in Montcada before being discovered by Espanyol's scouts in 2011 and subsequently joining their youth team. She moved to Barcelona's infantil-alevín team from Espanyol in 2013, and in her second season, she helped the team to win the youth league championship by scoring 100 goals in her 20 appearances. After proving herself as a technically gifted player and a natural goalscorer she quickly progressed through the different ranks of the youth team. One particular goal she scored after dribbling through four players in the derby against Espanyol in January 2017 trended across the internet.

Pina made her first official appearance for the senior team in January 2018. Thus, being only 16 years and 5 months old at the time, she set the record as the youngest player to have ever played for a senior Barça team in an official match. That record has been beaten by Vicky López, being 16 years, one month and 19 days old, on 17 September 2022.

In the summer of 2020, Pina was sent on loan to Sevilla for one season, alongside Barcelona teammate Carla Armengol.

In February 2023, Pina extended her contract with the club until June 2026. She played among the most minutes in the league for Barcelona in the 2023–24 season. She showed strong link-up play with Alexia Putellas, and Sport reported that, however she played, "things always happen when she has the ball".

On 15 December 2025, Pina signed a contract extension until 2029. She later helped Barcelona achieve a clean sweep of titles in the 2025–26 season, and during the celebrations at Camp Nou, photographs showed Pina celebrating with her partner on the pitch.

== International career ==
Pina was first called up to play for the national U-16 team at the age of 14 by Toña Is. In September 2016, she was invited for the first time to play for Spanish U-17 national team in a UEFA tournament in Příbram, where she scored 5 goals including a hat-trick in her debut match. She later played her first official game for the Spanish U-17 national team in 2016 World Cup against Jordan, scoring a goal in her first appearance.

At the end of 2017, her name was announced as the top UEFA national-team goal scoring player among both female and male players, scoring 16 goals during the year.

In 2021, she made her debut with the senior team in a friendly against Denmark.

She was one of Las 15, a group of players who made themselves unavailable for international selection in September 2022 due to their dissatisfaction with head coach Jorge Vilda, and among the dozen who were not involved 11 months later as Spain won the World Cup.

On 10 June 2025, Pina was called up to the Spain squad for the UEFA Women's Euro 2025.

== Career statistics ==
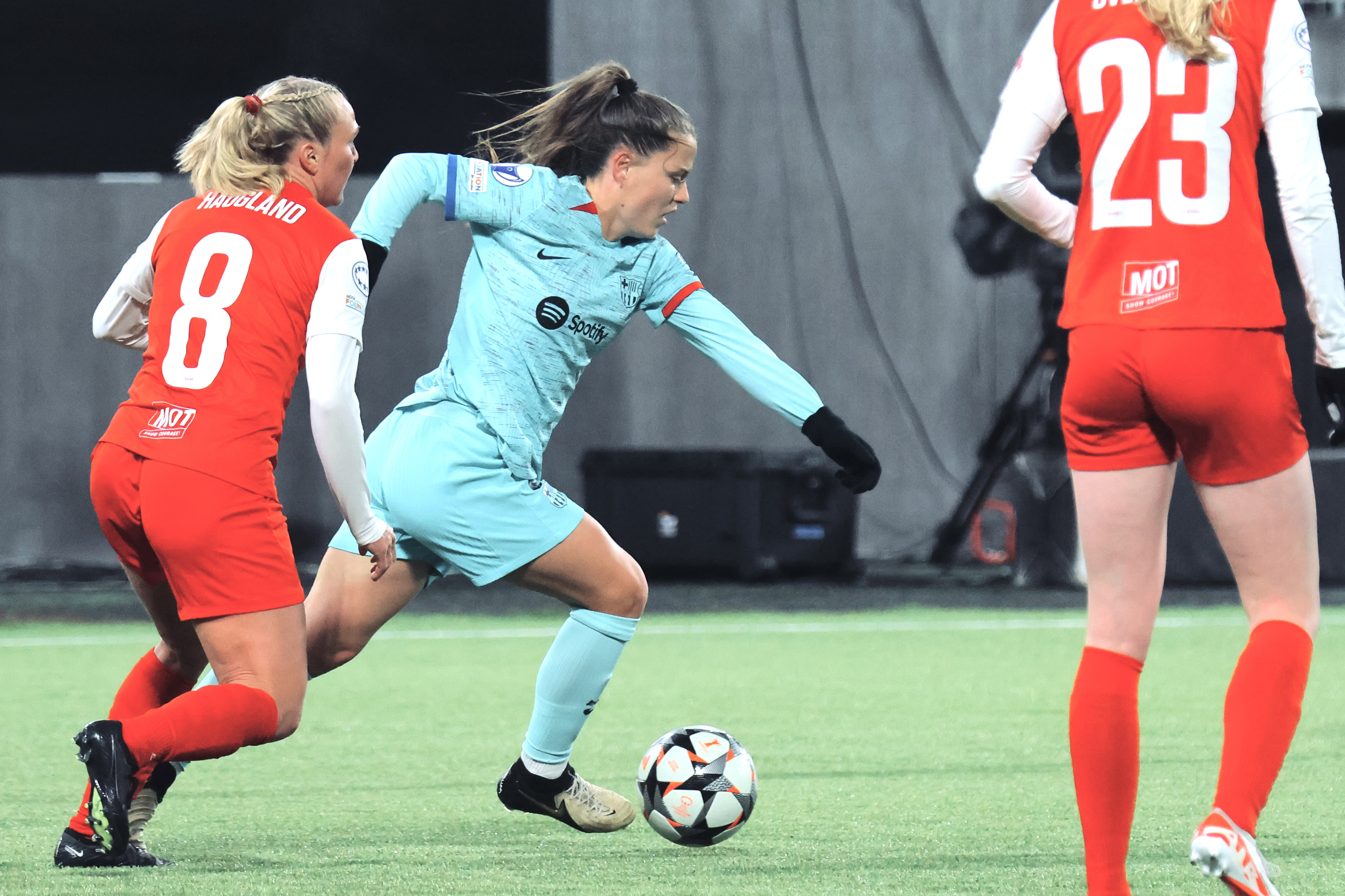
Pina with Barcelona in March 2024

=== Club ===
As of match played 31 May 2026

Appearances and goals by club, season and competition
| Club | Season | League | | | Copa de la Reina | | Europe | | Other | | Total | |
| Club | Season | Division | Apps | Goals | Apps | Goals | Apps | Goals | Apps | Goals | Apps | Goals |
|---|---|---|---|---|---|---|---|---|---|---|---|---|
| Barcelona | 2017–18 | Primera División | 1 | 0 | 0 | 0 | 0 | 0 | — | | 1 | 0 |
| Barcelona | 2018–19 | Primera División | 10 | 2 | 1 | 0 | 1 (Note: Appearance(s) in UEFA Women's Champions League) | 0 | — | | 12 | 2 |
| Barcelona | 2019–20 | Primera División | 4 | 0 | 1 | 0 | 1 | 0 | 0 | 0 | 6 | 0 |
| Barcelona | 2021–22 | Primera División | 24 | 15 | 4 | 2 | 8 | 2 | 1 (Note: Appearances in Supercopa de España) | 0 | 37 | 19 |
| Barcelona | 2022–23 | Primera División | 22 | 10 | 0 | 0 | 7 | 3 | 2 | 1 | 31 | 14 |
| Barcelona | 2023–24 | Liga F | 29 | 13 | 4 | 2 | 9 | 1 | 2 | 0 | 44 | 16 |
| Barcelona | 2024–25 | Liga F | 27 | 10 | 4 | 2 | 9 | 10 | 2 | 2 | 42 | 24 |
| Barcelona | 2025–26 | Liga F | 27 | 21 | 5 | 1 | 11 | 2 | 2 | 0 | 45 | 24 |
| Barcelona | Total | | 144 | 71 | 19 | 7 | 46 | 18 | 9 | 3 | 218 | 99 |
| Sevilla (loan) | 2019–20 | Primera División | 0 | 0 | 1 | 0 | — | | — | | 1 | 0 |
| Sevilla (loan) | 2020–21 | Primera División | 34 | 9 | 1 | 1 | — | | — | | 35 | 10 |
| Sevilla (loan) | Total | | 34 | 9 | 2 | 1 | — | | — | | 36 | 10 |
| Career total | | | 178 | 80 | 21 | 8 | 46 | 18 | 9 | 3 | 254 | 109 |

=== International ===
Scores and results list Spain's goal tally first, score column indicates score after each Pina goal.

List of international goals scored by Clàudia Pina
| No. | Date | Venue | Opponent | Score | Result | Competition |
|---|---|---|---|---|---|---|
| 1 | 29 November 2024 | Estadio Cartagonova, Cartagena, Spain | South Korea | 1–0 | 5–0 | Friendly |
| 2 | 3 December 2024 | Stade de Nice, Nice, France | France | 2–0 | 4–2 | Friendly |
| 3 | 21 February 2025 | Estadi Ciutat de València, Valencia, Spain | Belgium | 1–2 | 3–2 | 2025 UEFA Women's Nations League |
| 4 | 4 April 2025 | Estádio Capital do Móvel, Paços de Ferreira, Portugal] | Portugal | 3–1 | 4–2 | 2025 UEFA Women's Nations League |
| 5 | 3 June 2025 | RCDE Stadium, Cornellà de Llobregat, Spain | England | 1–1 | 2–1 | 2025 UEFA Women's Nations League |
| 6 | 3 June 2025 | RCDE Stadium, Cornellà de Llobregat, Spain | England | 2–1 | 2–1 | 2025 UEFA Women's Nations League |
| 7 | 27 June 2025 | Butarque, Leganés, Spain | Japan | 1–1 | 3–1 | Friendly |
| 8 | 7 July 2025 | Arena Thun, Thun, Switzerland | Belgium | 5–2 | 6–2 | UEFA Women's Euro 2025 |
| 9 | 18 July 2025 | Stadion Wankdorf, Bern, Switzerland | Switzerland | 2–0 | 2–0 | UEFA Women's Euro 2025 |
| 10 | 24 October 2025 | La Rosaleda, Málaga, Spain | Sweden | 2–0 | 4–0 | 2025 UEFA Women's Nations League Finals |
| 11 | 24 October 2025 | La Rosaleda, Málaga, Spain | Sweden | 4–0 | 4–0 | 2025 UEFA Women's Nations League Finals |
| 12 | 2 December 2025 | Metropolitano Stadium, Madrid, Spain | Germany | 1–0 | 3–0 | 2025 UEFA Women's Nations League Finals |
| 13 | 2 December 2025 | Metropolitano Stadium, Madrid, Spain | Germany | 3–0 | 3–0 | 2025 UEFA Women's Nations League Finals |
| 14 | 3 March 2026 | Estadio Municipal de Castalia, Castellón de la Plana, Spain | Iceland | 1–0 | 3–0 | 2027 FIFA World Cup qualification |
| 15 | 3 March 2026 | Estadio Municipal de Castalia, Castellón de la Plana, Spain | Iceland | 2–0 | 3–0 | 2027 FIFA World Cup qualification |
| 16 | 5 June 2026 | Estadi Mallorca Son Moix, Palma de Mallorca, Spain | England | 4–0 | 4–0 | 2027 FIFA World Cup qualification |

== Honours ==
Barcelona B

- Segunda División, Group III: 2016–17

FC Barcelona

- Primera División: 2019–20, 2021–22, 2022–23, 2023–24, 2024–25, 2025–26
- Copa de la Reina de Fútbol: 2019–20, 2021–22, 2023–24, 2024–25, 2025–26
- Supercopa Femenina: 2019–20, 2021–22, 2022–23, 2023–24, 2024–25, 2025–26
- UEFA Women's Champions League: 2022–23, 2023–24, 2025–26

Spain

- UEFA Women's Championship runner-up: 2025
- UEFA Women's Nations League: 2025

Spain U20

- FIFA U-20 Women's World Cup runner-up: 2018

Spain U17

- FIFA U-17 Women's World Cup: 2018; third place: 2016
- UEFA Women's Under-17 Championship runner-up: 2017

Individual

- The Best FIFA Women's 11: 2025
- UEFA Women's Champions League top scorer: 2024–25
- UEFA Women's Champions League Team of the Season: 2024–25
- FIFA U-17 Women's World Cup Golden Ball: 2018
- FIFA U-17 Women's World Cup Silver Boot: 2018
- UEFA Women's Under-17 Championship Team of the Tournament: 2017
- Liga F Player of the Month: May 2025, November 2025
- Premi Barça Jugadors (Barça Players Award): 2024–25
- Memorial Aldo Rovira Award: 2024–25
- IFFHS Women's World Best International Goal Scorer: 2025
- IFFHS Women's Player of the Month: April 2025
