= Luany =

Brazilian footballer (born 2003)

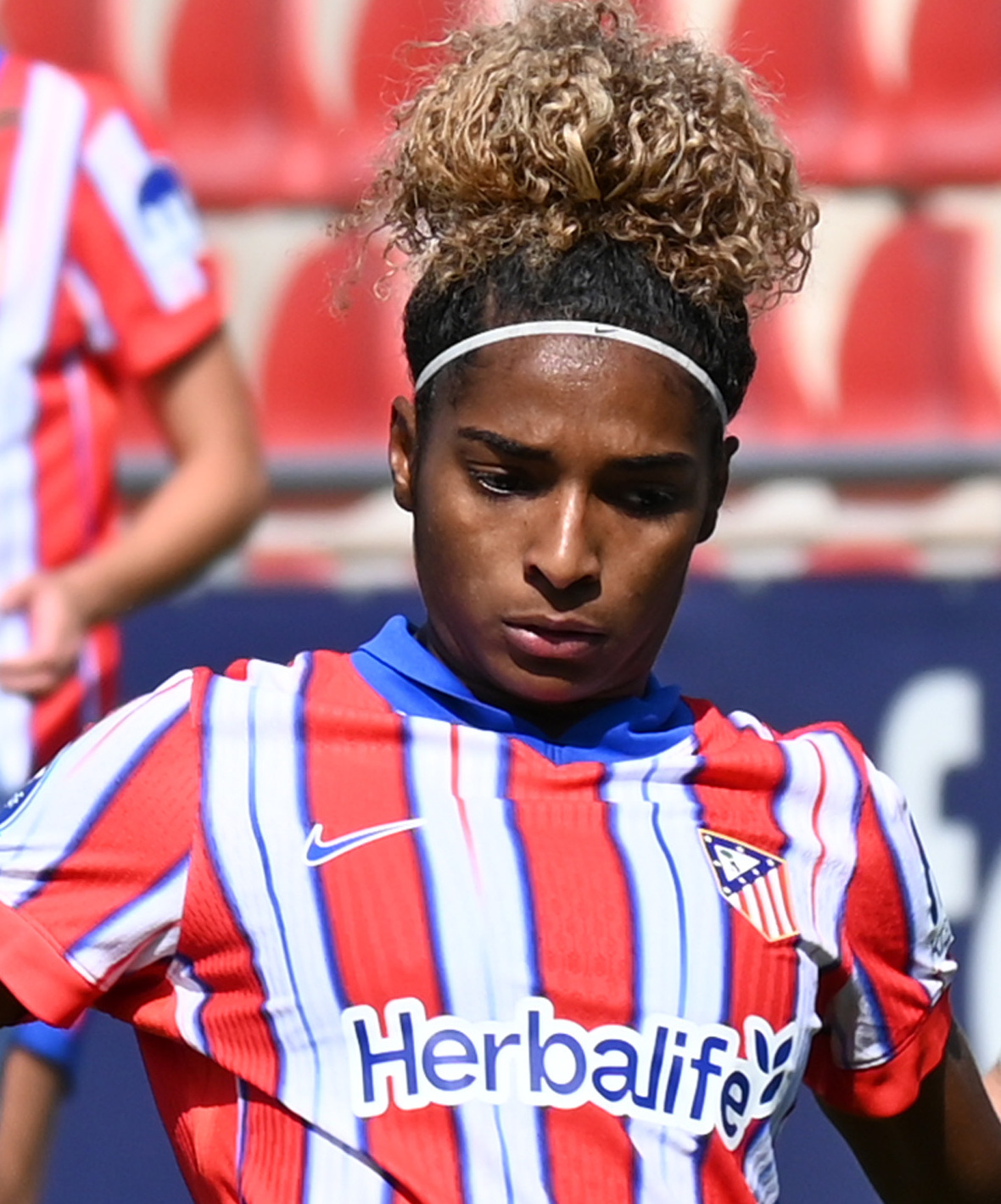
- Luany in 2024

Personal information
- Full name: Luany Vitória da Silva Rosa
- Date of birth: 3 February 2003 (age 23)
- Place of birth: Nova Iguaçu, Brazil
- Height: 1.64 m (5 ft 5 in)
- Position: Midfielder

Team information
- Current team: Atlético Madrid
- Number: 22

Youth career
- Daminhas da Bola
- 2019–2021: Fluminense
- 2022: Grêmio

Senior career*
Years	Team	Apps	(Gls)
2019–2021	Fluminense	13	(2)
2022	Grêmio	9	(3)
2023–2024	OL Reign	0	(0)
2023–2024	→ Madrid CFF (loan)	26	(6)
2024–	Atlético Madrid	14	(3)

International career^{‡}
2022	Brazil U20	12	(1)
2025–	Brazil	16	(5)
Medal record
Women's football
Representing Brazil
Copa América Femenina
Gold medal – first place	2025 Ecuador
- * Club domestic league appearances and goals as of 19:37, 2 April 2025 (UTC) ‡ National team caps and goals as of 18:45, 10 October 2026 (UTC)

Luany Vitória da Silva Rosa (born 3 February 2003), simply known as Luany, is a Brazilian professional footballer who plays as a midfielder for Spanish club Atlético Madrid of Liga F.

== Club career ==
Luany began her professional career in Brazil with Grêmio, before transferring to American club OL Reign in February 2023. She did not make an appearance for the team before being loaned by the Reign on 11 August 2023 to Madrid CFF, for undisclosed financial terms through June 2024.

== International career ==
Luany has represented Brazil at the under-20 level, winning the 2022 South American Under-20 Women's Football Championship and playing at the 2022 FIFA U-20 Women's World Cup.

== International goals ==
List of international goals scored by Luany
No.	Date	Venue	Opponent	Score	Result	Competition
1.	27 June 2025	Stade des Alpes, Grenoble, France	France	1–0	2–3	Friendly
2.	16 July 2025	Estadio Gonzalo Pozo Ripalda, Quito, Ecuador	Bolivia	1–0	6–0	2025 Copa América Femenina
3.	16 July 2025	Estadio Gonzalo Pozo Ripalda, Quito, Ecuador	Bolivia	2–0	6–0	2025 Copa América Femenina
4.	28 October 2025	Stadio Ennio Tardini, Parma, Italy	Italy	1–0	1–0	Friendly
5.	10 October 2026	Estádio Beira-Rio, Porto Alegre, Brazil	Argentina	1–0	3–1	Friendly

== Honours ==
Individual

- Liga F Player of the Month: September 2025
- Atlético Madrid Player of the Year: 2025–26
