= Zulema González González =

Spanish football referee (born 1992)

Zulema González
- Born: Zulema González González; 8 April 1992 (age 34); Ourense, Galicia, Spain
- Other occupation: Educator

Domestic
Years	League	Role
2017–present	Liga F	Referee

International
Years	League	Role
2019–	FIFA listed	Referee

Zulema González González (born 8 April 1992) is a Spanish football referee from Ourense, Galicia. She officiates in the Liga F, the top division of women's football in Spain, and is a FIFA international referee; she became the first Galician woman to be appointed to the FIFA list, joining it on 1 January 2019.

== Early life and amateur career ==
González began refereeing as a youth in Galicia and, in 2011, became the first woman to reach the top tier of Ourense provincial football. She has said that she started officiating matches at the age of twelve and accumulated more than fifteen seasons of experience, and she went on to referee a women's friendly between Brazil and Spain.

She belongs to the Galician Refereeing Committee (Comité de Árbitros de Galicia) and comes from a refereeing family: she is the niece of Manuel González, a former assistant referee in the Segunda División, and of Bernardino González, a former international referee who later became a delegate for UEFA and the Spanish football federation. She reached the elite of Spanish women's football in 2017, when the Primera División Femenina began to be officiated exclusively by women.

== Refereeing career ==
=== Promotion and FIFA appointment ===
The Royal Spanish Football Federation's Technical Committee of Referees announced in December 2018 that González, then aged 26, would join the FIFA international list, raising the number of Spanish women among the federation's main international referees from four to five. Early in 2019 she travelled to Lisbon to complete the 28th UEFA Introductory Course for International Referees; she described the international badge as the result of many years of work.

Alongside her work in women's football, González has also officiated in the men's Tercera Federación.

=== Notable matches and recognition ===
González refereed her first cup final at the La Rosaleda stadium in Málaga, taking charge of the Copa de la Reina final between FC Barcelona and EDF Logroño.

For the 2021–22 season she received the Vicente Acevedo Trophy as the best referee in the Primera División Femenina, an award presented by the Technical Committee of Referees. In November 2024 she was appointed to referee the Liga F Clásico between Real Madrid and FC Barcelona; by then she had officiated 91 top-flight matches across eight seasons.

== Personal life ==
González belongs to the Galician Refereeing Committee (Comité de Árbitros de Galicia) and comes from a family of referees: she is the niece of Manuel González, a former assistant referee in the Segunda División, and of Bernardino González, a former international referee who later became a delegate for UEFA and the Spanish football federation. Away from refereeing, González has worked as an educator, a psychologist and a sports coach, and she practises animal-assisted therapy. In a 2025 interview she argued for "humanising" the figure of the referee and for greater public understanding of the work behind officiating.
