= Elisabeth Calvo Valentín =

Spanish football referee (born 1997)

- Full name: Elisabeth Calvo Valentín
- Born: 9 July 1997 (age 29); Torrejón de Ardoz, Spain

Domestic
Years	League	Role
2022–present	Primera División Femenina	Referee

International
Years	League	Role
2025–present	FIFA listed	Referee

Elisabeth Calvo Valentín (born 9 July 1997) is a Spanish football referee affiliated with the Madrid committee of the Royal Spanish Football Federation's Technical Committee of Referees. She has officiated in the Primera División Femenina (Liga F), the top division of Spanish women's football, since the 2022-23 season, served as the video assistant referee in the 2024 Copa de la Reina final, and in 2025 joined the list of Spanish FIFA international referees.

== Early life ==
Calvo Valentín was born on 9 July 1997 in Torrejón de Ardoz, in the Community of Madrid.

== Refereeing career ==
=== Primera División Femenina ===
In June 2022, the Technical Committee of Referees of the Royal Spanish Football Federation announced that Calvo Valentín, of the Madrid committee, and María Gloria Planes Terol, of the Murcia committee, would be promoted to the Primera División Femenina for the 2022-23 season. The two were the only newly promoted referees in that season's top-flight officiating roster. Her promotion was recognised at the Madrid referees' committee "Día del Árbitro" (Referee's Day) gala, held in her home town of Torrejón de Ardoz.

On 18 May 2024, Calvo Valentín acted as the video assistant referee in the final of the Copa de la Reina, the Spanish women's national cup, played at La Romareda in Zaragoza; the match on the pitch was refereed by María Eugenia Gil Soriano. The final ended with an 8-0 victory for FC Barcelona over Real Sociedad, the Catalan club's tenth title in the competition.

In January 2026 she was appointed to officiate one of the semi-finals of the Supercopa de España Femenina in Castellón, the FC Barcelona-Athletic Club tie.

=== Segunda Federación ===
From the 2024-25 season, Calvo Valentín also began officiating men's matches in the Segunda Federación, the fourth tier of Spanish football, making her debut in the category in the Villanovense-Xerez DFC fixture, which ended goalless. She has since continued to referee regularly in the division, including the Xerez CD-CD Extremadura match in April 2026.

=== International ===
On 24 June 2024, the Technical Committee of Referees proposed Calvo Valentín to FIFA as a new international referee to fill one of Spain's international places for 2025. In early 2025, she attended the UEFA advanced referees' course in Athens as a newly added international referee, alongside Spain's elite-group officials.
