= Ane Azkona =

Spanish footballer (born 1998)

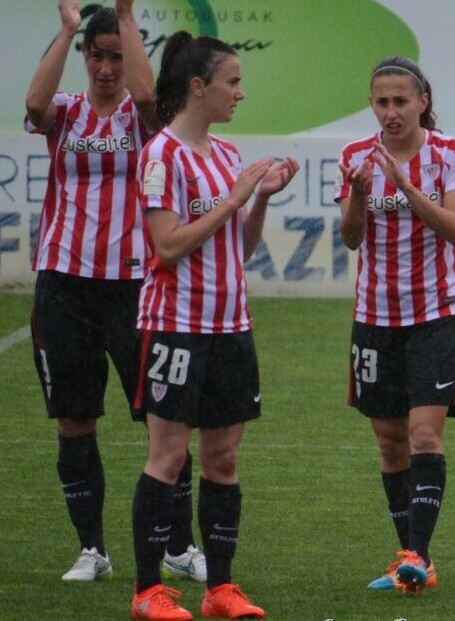
- Azkona (centre) with Athletic Club in 2017

Personal information
- Full name: Ane Azkona Fuente
- Date of birth: 15 July 1998 (age 28)
- Place of birth: Pamplona, Spain
- Height: 1.64 m (5 ft 5 in)
- Position: Forward

Team information
- Current team: Athletic Club
- Number: 11

Youth career
- 2012–2014: Gazte Berriak

Senior career*
Years	Team	Apps	(Gls)
2014–2015	Gazte Berriak		
2015–2016	Ardoi		
2016–2019	Athletic Club B	62	(71)
2016–	Athletic Club	199	(45)

International career
2016–2017	Spain U19	5	(4)
2022	Spain	1	(0)
Medal record
Women's football
Representing Spain
UEFA Women's Under-19 Championship
Winner	2017 Northern Ireland
- * Club domestic league appearances and goals as of 21:01, 18 November 2026 (UTC)

Ane Azkona Fuente (born 15 July 1998) is a Spanish professional footballer who plays as a forward for Liga F club Athletic Club.

== Club career ==
A keen rock climber and ballerina as a child, Azkona started her career playing futsal for Gazte Berriak, a team based in Ansoain. Following this, she spent a year at Ardoi before signing for Athletic Club aged 18. On 13 January 2019, she scored her first league goal for Athletic, in the 94th minute of a match against Sporting de Huelva. In the 2019–20 Primera División season, she provided more assists than any other Athletic player and signed a new three-year contract with the club at the end of that season.

On 10 June 2020, it was announced that she had torn the anterior cruciate ligament in her right knee during a training session. She returned from this injury over eight months later. She became an increasingly important member of the team over the subsequent seasons as other players departed; in March 2023 she agreed a new contract running to 2026.

== International career ==
Azkona was part of the Spain under-19 squad which won the 2017 UEFA Women's Under-19 Championship. In October 2019, she was called up to the inaugural squad for España Promesas (essentially Spain B), along with two clubmates. She made her full debut as a late substitute in a 2–0 friendly victory over the United States (played in her hometown Pamplona) in October 2022.

== Honours ==
Spain U19

- UEFA Women's Under-19 Championship: 2017
