= Lauri (footballer) =

Spanish footballer (born 1990)

Laura Requena Sánchez (born May 25, 1990) is a Spanish footballer who plays as a striker for Granada.

== Early life ==
A native of La Mancha, Spain, Lauri joined the youth academy of Spanish side Fundación Albacete at the age of twelve. She attended ESCO Granada for schooling.

== Career ==
Lauri plays for Spanish side Granada, where she captained the club.

== Style of play ==
Lauri mainly operates as a striker and has been described as a "tireless fighter, perhaps the most supportive of the forwards, she always puts the collective interest above her own".
