= Patri Gavira =

Spanish footballer (born 1989)

Personal information
- Full name: Patricia Gavira Collado
- Date of birth: 26 April 1989 (age 37)
- Place of birth: Taraguilla, Spain
- Height: 1.71 m (5 ft 7 in)
- Position: Midfielder

Team information
- Current team: Granadilla
- Number: 22

Senior career*
Years	Team	Apps	(Gls)
2010–2013	Sevilla	39+	(1+)
2013–2016	Sporting de Huelva	87	(13)
2016–	Granadilla	184	(6)
- * Club domestic league appearances and goals as of 09:55, 10 June 2023 (UTC)

Patricia Gavira Collado (born 26 April 1989) is a Spanish footballer who plays as a midfielder for Granadilla.

== Club career ==
Patri Gavira started her career at Sevilla.
