= Iñaki Goikoetxea =

Spanish footballer

Personal information
- Full name: Iñaki Goikoetxea Beristain
- Date of birth: 6 May 1982 (age 44)
- Place of birth: Deba, Spain
- Height: 1.80 m (5 ft 11 in)
- Position: Striker

Youth career
- Amaikak Bat
- Aurrerá Ondarroa

Senior career*
Years	Team	Apps	(Gls)
2002–2003	Basconia		
2003–2004	Bilbao Athletic	18	(0)
2004–2006	Barakaldo	66	(16)
2006–2007	Lemona	36	(13)
2007–2011	Real Unión	137	(30)
2011–2012	Badalona	22	(5)
2012–2013	Amorebieta	37	(8)
2013–2015	Real Unión	64	(10)
2015–2016	Aviron Bayonnais	22	(1)
Total		402	(83)

Managerial career
- 2015–2018: Real Unión (assistant)
- 2018–2021: Real Sociedad (women) (assistant)
- 2021–2022: Dominican Republic (assistant)
- 2023-2025: Real Unión
- 2025-: SD Eibar
- * Club domestic league appearances and goals

Iñaki Goikoetxea Beristain (born 6 May 1982 in Deba, Gipuzkoa) is a Spanish former professional footballer who played as a striker, and is the current manager of Liga F side SD Eibar.
