= Ciutat Esportiva Dani Jarque =

Sports facility of the Real Club Deportivo Espanyol

Coordinates: 41°25′35″N 02°12′49″E

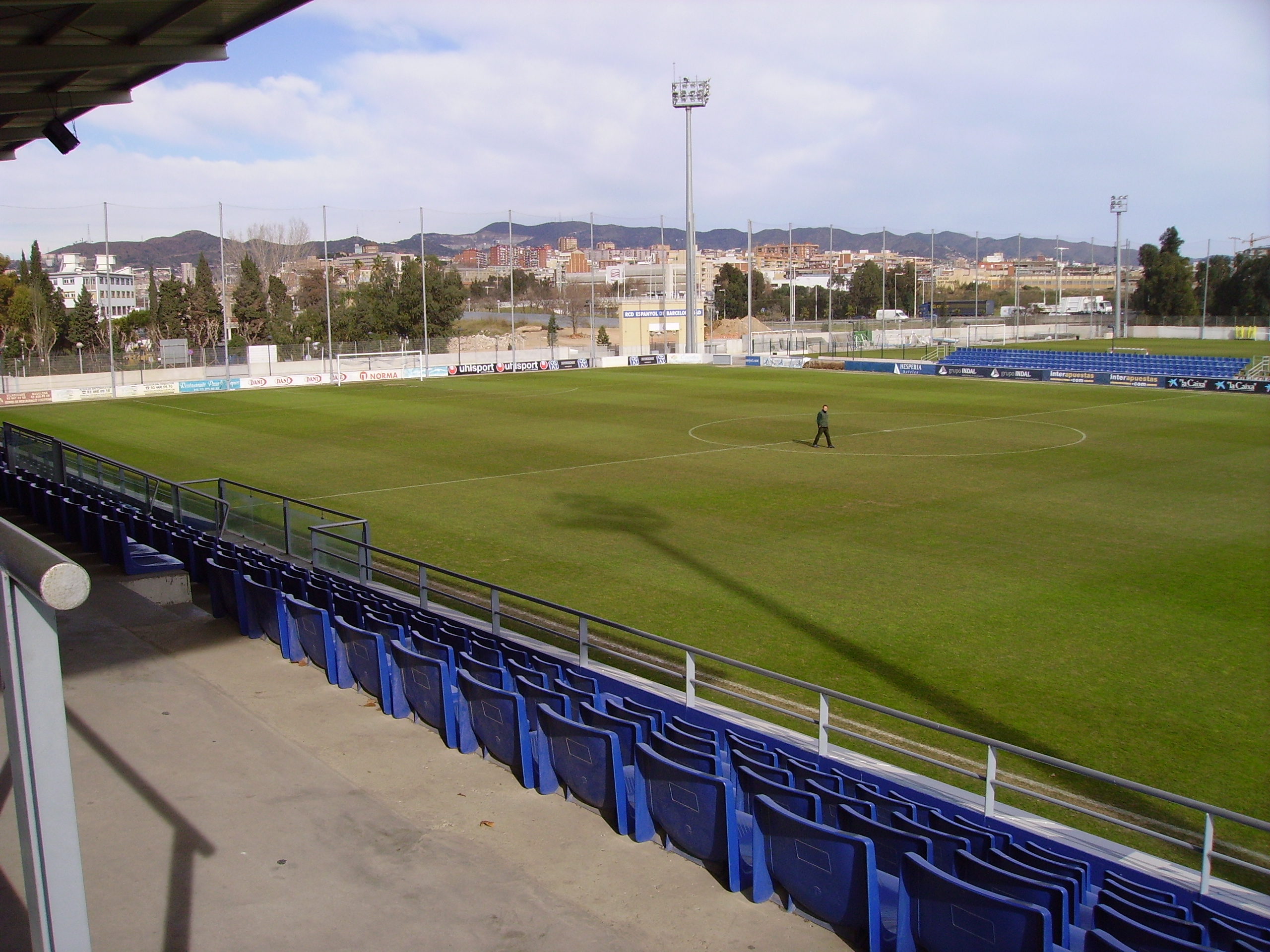
- Interactive map of Ciutat Esportiva Dani Jarque
- Former names: Ciutat Esportiva del RCD Espanyol
- Location: Sant Adrià de Besòs; Catalonia, Spain
- Owner: RCD Espanyol
- Type: Football training ground

Construction
- Built: 2001

Tenants
- RCD Espanyol Femenino; RCD Espanyol (training) (2001-); RCD Espanyol B (2001-)

Website
- Ciutat Esportiva Dani Jarque

The Ciutat Esportiva Dani Jarque is the training ground of the Primera Division club RCD Espanyol and home of RCD Espanyol B and RCD Espanyol Femenino. Located in Sant Adrià de Besòs, it was opened in 2001.

== Overview ==
Occupying an area of 60,000 m^{2} near Barcelona, the training centre was inaugurated in 2001 as Ciutat Esportiva del RCD Espanyol, but soon was popularly known as Sarrià, in reference to the historic stadium of RCD Espanyol Estadi de Sarrià. However, on 21 January 2012, the club president Ramon Condal announced that the centre was officially renamed as Ciutat Esportiva Dani Jarque in memory of the late Espanyol captain Dani Jarque.

The centre is accessible via the following routes:

- Metro: La Pau (L4 o L2), Verneda (L4).
- Bus: 44, 43, 42, B-21, B-23, B-25.
- Car direction Besós Ronda Litoral: Exit 26 (Sant Adrià, Port Fòrum Sant Adrià, La Mina, Llull).
- Car direction Llobregat Ronda Litorial: Exit 29 (Verneda, Sant Adrià, Rambla Guipúscoa).

== Facilities ==
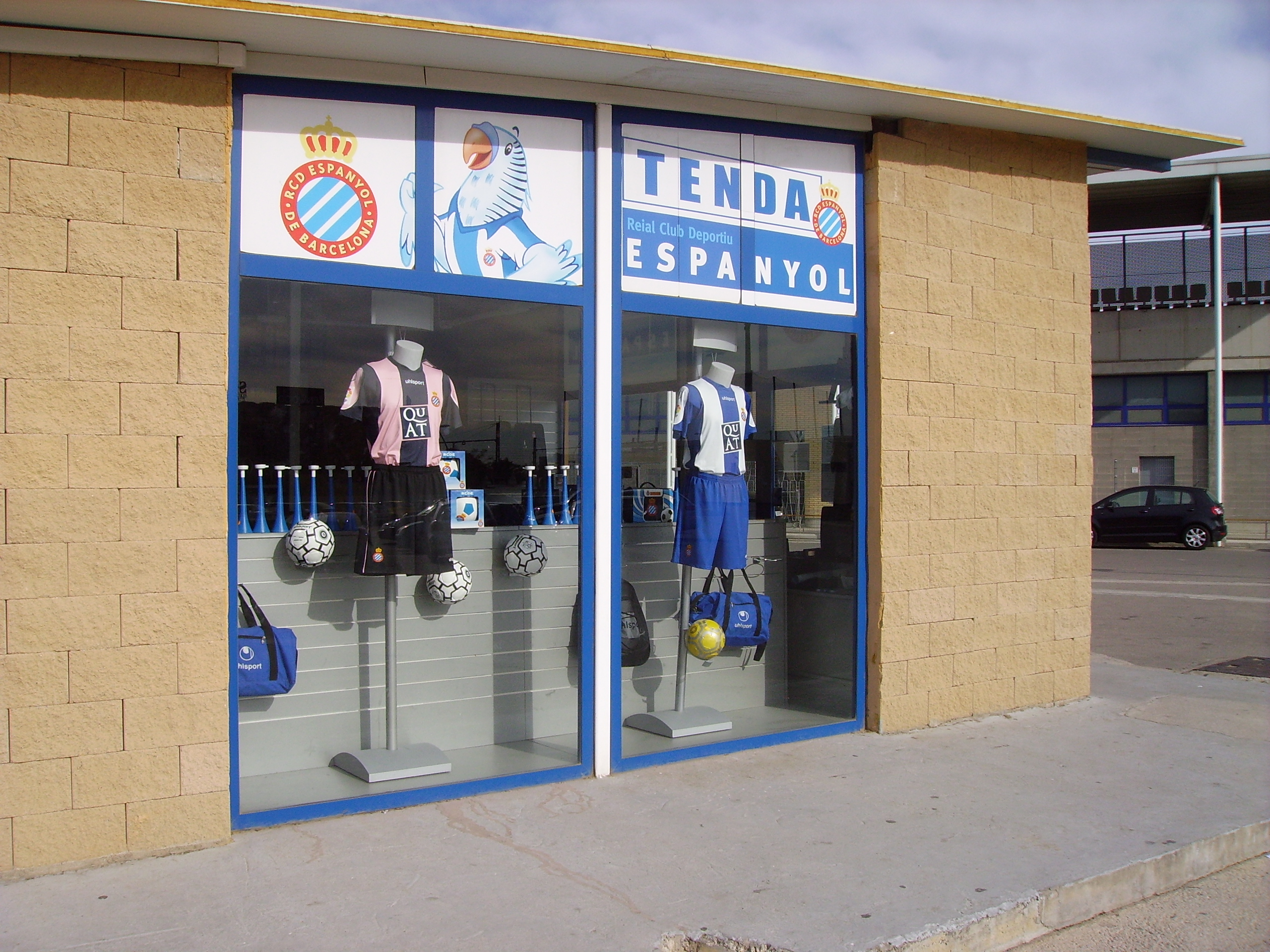
RCDE official store at the Ciutat Esportiva

- Ciutat Esportiva Stadium (107 x 68 meters) with a capacity of 1,520 seats, is the home stadium of RCD Espanyol B, the reserve team of RCD Espanyol. It is also home to the club's youth sides and the women's team.
- 1 natural grass field (107 x 68 meters).
- 2 artificial fields (90 x 63.5 meters each).
- 7 mini fields with artificial pitch (60 x 33 meters each).
- Goalkeepers-designated natural grass training field.
- Multi Sports activities field of artificial grass.
- Service centre with gymnasium, restaurant, etc.
- Parking lot with a capacity of 150 cars.
