= Adriana Nanclares =

Spanish footballer (born 2002)

Personal information
- Full name: Adriana Nanclares Romero
- Date of birth: 9 May 2002 (age 24)
- Place of birth: Miranda de Ebro, Spain
- Height: 1.70 m (5 ft 7 in)
- Position: Goalkeeper

Team information
- Current team: Athletic Club
- Number: 13

Youth career
- 2013–2017: CD Casco Viejo

Senior career*
Years	Team	Apps	(Gls)
2017–2018	Aurrera Vitoria		
2018–2019	→ Oiartzun (loan)		
2019–2023	Real Sociedad	40	(0)
2023–	Athletic Club	50	(0)

International career^{‡}
2022	Spain U20	3	(0)
2021–	Spain U23	6	(0)
2024–	Spain	2	(0)
Medal record
Women's football
Representing Spain
UEFA Women's Championship
Runner-up	2025 Switzerland
FIFA U-20 Women's World Cup
Winner	2022 Costa Rica
- * Club domestic league appearances and goals as of 24 July 2025 ‡ National team caps and goals as of 24 July 2025

Adriana Nanclares Romero (Note: In this Spanish name, the first or paternal surname is Nanclares and the second or maternal family name is Romero.) (born 9 May 2002) is a Spanish professional footballer who plays as a goalkeeper for Athletic Club and the Spain national team. She previously played for Real Sociedad.

== Club career ==
Nanclares started her career at Aurrera Vitoria. She spent a year on loan at Oiartzun but, throughout that period, she still trained with Real Sociedad from Monday to Thursday every week and only trained with Oiartzun on a Friday. Following an injury to Real Sociedad's main goalkeeper Mariasun Quiñones, in the 2019–20 season, Nanclares was presented with an opportunity to make her debut in the opening league fixture against Valencia. She ended up playing in four games in September including the Valencia one. During the 2021–22 and 2022–23 seasons, she and Elene Lete shared the goalkeeping duties almost equally in terms of appearances.

In 2023 she joined Athletic Club on a three-year contract, soon displacing Quiñones as the regular starter.

== International career ==
Nanclares made her debut for the senior Spain team in November 2024, playing the entirety of a 5–0 friendly victory over South Korea (club teammate Maite Zubieta also gained a first cap, though as a substitute).

On 10 June 2025, Nanclares was called up to the Spain squad for the UEFA Women's Euro 2025.

== Honours ==
Spain U20

- FIFA U-20 Women's World Cup: 2022

Spain

- UEFA Women's Championship runner-up: 2025
