= Paola Ulloa =

Spanish footballer (born 1996)

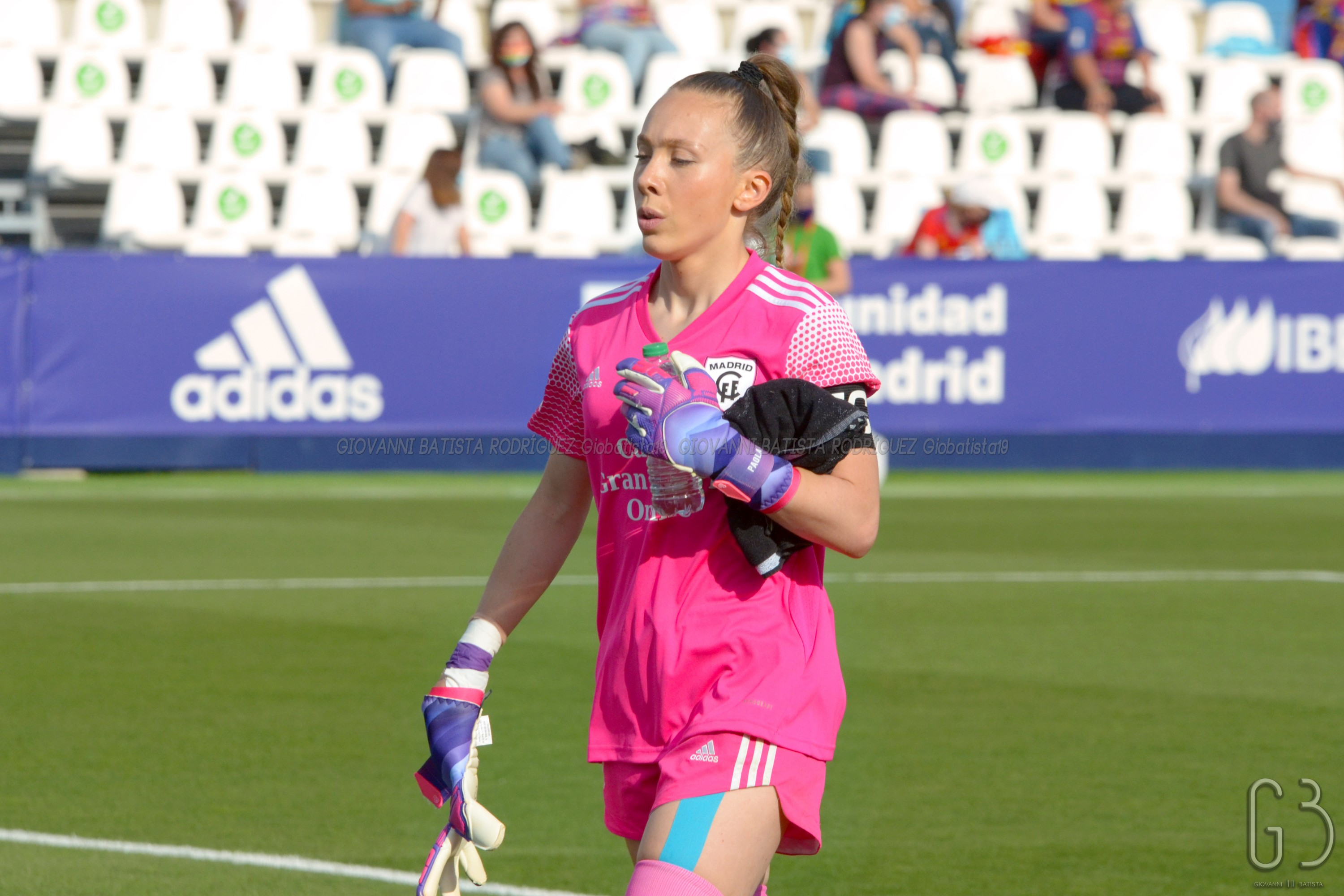
- playing for Madrid CFF, 2021

Personal information
- Full name: Paola Ulloa Jiménez
- Date of birth: 26 December 1996 (age 29)
- Place of birth: Madrid, Spain
- Height: 1.65 m (5 ft 5 in)
- Position: Goalkeeper

Team information
- Current team: Madrid CFF
- Number: 1

Youth career
- 2010–2017: Madrid CFF

Senior career*
Years	Team	Apps	(Gls)
2017–	Madrid CFF	101	(0)
- * Club domestic league appearances and goals as of 28 January 2022

Paola Ulloa Jiménez (born 26 December 1996) is a Spanish professional footballer who plays as a goalkeeper for Liga F club Madrid CFF.

== Club career ==
Ulloa started her career at Madrid CFF.
