= Irene Oguiza =

Spanish footballer (born 2000)

Personal information
- Full name: Irene Oguiza Martínez
- Date of birth: 5 January 2000 (age 26)
- Place of birth: Durango, Spain
- Position: Midfielder

Team information
- Current team: Athletic Club
- Number: 12

Youth career
- 2013–2016: Ezkurdi

Senior career*
Years	Team	Apps	(Gls)
2016–2021	Athletic Club B	47	(6)
2020–	Athletic Club	85	(13)

International career^{‡}
2022	Spain U23	1	(0)
- * Club domestic league appearances and goals as of 25 July 2025 ‡ National team caps and goals as of 05:40, 22 December 2023 (UTC)

Irene Oguiza Martínez (born 5 January 2000) is a Spanish footballer who plays as a midfielder for Athletic Club.

== Club career ==
Oguiza started her career in Ezkurdi's academy. She was then developed at Athletic Club, playing in their B-team for four seasons. On 19 January 2020 she made her debut for the first team, coming on as a substitute for Andrea Sierra against Madrid CFF. Her first start for the Athletic first team was against Deportivo on 2 February, during which she suffered an anterior cruciate ligament injury to her knee. She had an operation on 5 March and would not play again until 8 November, against Collerense, in which she scored a goal.

For the remainder of that season, Oguiza established herself as a first team regular under manager Iraia Iturregi and it was announced that she would be formally promoted to Athletic's first team for the 2021–22 Primera División season. In June 2024, now one of the club's captains, she signed a new contract running to 2026.
