= Ciudad Deportiva del Granada CF =

Training ground of Granada CF in Granada, Spain

Coordinates: 37°12′29″N 03°36′00″W

- Interactive map of Ciudad Deportiva del Granada CF
- Location: Granada; Andalusia, Spain
- Owner: Granada CF
- Type: Football training ground

Construction
- Built: 2015
- Cost: € 8.5 million

Tenant
- Granada CF (training) (2015-)

The Ciudad Deportiva del Granada CF, is the training ground of the Spanish football club Granada CF, located in Granada, Spain. It occupies an area of 75,535 m^{2}.

The 1st phase of the training centre occupying an area of 47,833m², was completed earlier in 2015. The 2nd phase will occupy an area of 27,702 m^{2}. The total cost of the project will some around € 8.5 million.

== Facilities ==
- The Central Stadium of the Ciudad Deportiva with a capacity of 2,000 seats is currently under construction. It will also serve as the home ground of Recreativo Granada; the reserve team of Granada CF.
- 3 full-size natural grass pitches.
- 1 full-size artificial turf pitch
- 1 seven-a-side football natural grass pitch.
- Service centre with gymnasium.
