= Ciudad Deportiva José Ramón Cisneros Palacios =

Football training area in Seville, Spain

Coordinates: 37°21′10″N 05°56′52″W

- Interactive map of Ciudad Deportiva José Ramón Cisneros Palacios
- Location: Seville; Andalusia
- Owner: Sevilla FC
- Type: Football training ground

Construction
- Built: 1974

Tenants
- Sevilla FC (training) (1974–present); Sevilla Atletico; Sevilla FC C Sevilla Youth; Sevilla Women

Website
- Ciudad Deportiva José Ramón Cisneros Palacios

The Ciudad Deportiva José Ramón Cisneros Palacios, is the training ground of the Primera Division club Sevilla FC. Located in Seville, it was opened in 1974.

== Overview ==
Occupying an area of 250,000 m^{2}, it is named in memory of the president of the club during the 1960s José Ramón Cisneros Palacios who had proposed the idea of enlarging the club with new facilities.

The training ground is located at the southeastern outskirts of Seville, on the road to Utrera. The first stage of the structure was launched in 1968 with an area of 125,000 m^{2} (50% of the current area). It was completed in 1974. However, the Ciudad Deportiva has been entirely redeveloped over the time and the total area of the facilities was doubled. It is currently headquarters the first team trainings, as well as the official matches of the reserve team Sevilla Atlético; the football field for the latter is known as Estadio Jesús Navas.

== Facilities ==
- Estadio Jesús Navas: opened in 1987, currently having a capacity of 8,000 seats after the most recent renovation conducted between 2016 and 2017. The stadium serves as the home ground of Sevilla Atlético and the Sevilla's women's team. Until October 2018, it was known as Viejo Nervión, before being renamed from the club's two-term player and 2010 world champion Jesús Navas.
- 5 regular-sized natural grass pitches.
- 4 regular-sized artificial turf pitches.
- 1 seven-a-side natural grass pitch for the Antonio Puerta football school.
- Service centre with gymnasium.

== Access ==
In the club official website, the address of the venue appears as:

- Ramón Cisneros Palacios, Ctra. Utrera, Km.1 - Montequinto- Sevilla, 41005 Sevilla, Spain.

The venue could be reached through public bus via the following line:

- 38A (Pitamo U.p.o. y Prado de S.Sebastián). From the Universidad Pablo Olavide bus stop, 5 min. walking.

The underground metro is the alternative way to reach the venue via the following line:

- L1 (Pablo de Olavide), after 7 min. walking.
