= 2026–27 Primera Federación (women) =

Spanish women soccer 2nd division 26-27 season

Primera Federación
- Season: 2026–27
- Dates: 12 September 2026 – 9 May 2027
- Teams: 14 teams
- Matches: 53
- Goals: 162 (3.06 per match)
- Top goalscorer: Ari Arias (8)
- All statistics correct as of 15 November 2026.

The 2026–27 Primera Federación FutFem is the 26th season of the second highest league tier of women's football in Spain, and the fifth under that name and using a single group format.

== Summary ==
14 teams is taking part in the league: 8 from the previous season, 2 relegated from the previous Liga F campaign (Alhama CF and Levante) and 4 promoted from the Segunda Federación (Real Sociedad B, Sport Extremadura, Real Unión de Tenerife and Athletic Club B).

The winner (or the highest eligible club in the event of the champion being a reserve team) will be promoted automatically to the 2027–28 season of Liga F with the next four eligible clubs entering a post-season play-off phase for a second spot. One team (14th place) will be relegated to the Segunda Federación league.

== Teams ==
=== Changes ===
The following teams changed division since the 2025–26 season.

To Primera Federación
▼ Relegated from Liga F
- Levante
- Alhama
▲ Promoted from Segunda Federación
- Real Sociedad B
- Athletic Club B
- Real Unión Tenerife
- Sport Extremadura

From Primera Federación
▲ Promoted to Liga F
- Alavés
- Valencia
▼ Relegated to Segunda Federación
- SE AEM
- Europa
- Real Betis
- Real Oviedo

=== Stadium and location ===
Team	Location	Stadium	Capacity	2025–26 season
Albacete	Albacete	Andrés Iniesta	3,000	8th in Primera Federación
Alhama^{↓}	Alhama de Murcia	Campo Municipal José Kubala	1,500	15th in Liga F
Athletic Club B^{↑}	Lezama	Lezama Facilities	2,989	1st in Segunda Federación Group 1
Atlético Madrid B	Alcalá de Henares	Centro Deportivo Wanda	2,700	10th in Primera Federación
Barcelona B	Sant Joan Despí	Ciutat Esportiva Joan Gamper	1,400	1st in Primera Federación
Cacereño	Cáceres	Manuel Sánchez Delgado	1,400	9th in Primera Federación
Levante^{↓}	Bunyol	Ciudad Deportiva de Buñol	600	16th in Liga F
Osasuna	Pamplona	Tajonar Facilities	4,500	7th in Primera Federación
Real Madrid B	Valdebebas	Ciudad Real Madrid	1,000	4th in Primera Federación
Real Sociedad B^{↑}	San Sebastián	Zubieta Facilities	2,500	Promotion play-off winner
RU Tenerife^{↑}	Santa Cruz de Tenerife	La Salud	2,000	1st in Segunda Federación Group 2
Sport Extremadura^{↑}	Badajoz	Instalaciones Deportivas Municipales El Vivero	900	1st in Segunda Federación Group 3
UD Tenerife B	Santa Cruz de Tenerife	Ciudad Deportiva Javier Pérez	1,632	5th in Primera Federación
Villarreal	Villarreal	Mini Estadi de Villarreal	3,500	6th in Primera Federación

^{↓}	Relegated from the Liga F
^{↑}	Promoted from the Segunda Federación

=== Personnel and kits ===
Team	Manager	Kit manufacturer	Main shirt sponsor
Albacete	(Spain national football team) Rubén López	(Germany) Adidas	
Alhama	(Spain national football team) Randri García	(United States) Nike	ElPozo
Athletic Club B	(Spain national football team) Ander Ojanguren	(United States) Nike	Kosner
Atlético Madrid B	(Spain national football team) Roberto Hernández	(United States) Nike	
Barcelona B	(Spain national football team) Óscar Belis	(United States) Nike	
Cacereño	(Spain national football team) Ernesto Sánchez	(Denmark) Hummel	Extremadura
Levante	(Spain national football team) Javier Aguado	(Italy) Macron	
Osasuna	(Spain national football team) Roberto Pérez	(Italy) Macron	Baikor Worldwide
Real Madrid B	(Spain national football team) Fernando Maillo	(Germany) Adidas	Emirates
Real Sociedad B	(Spain national football team) Aitor Resende	(Spain) Joma	
RU Tenerife	(Spain national football team) Noé Dávila	(Italy) Kappa	
Sport Extremadura	(Spain national football team) Juan Carlos Antúnez	(Italy) Macron	
UD Tenerife B	(Spain national football team) Adrián Albéniz	(Italy) Macron	
Villarreal	(Spain national football team) Jordi Ferriols	(Spain) Joma	Pamesa Cerámica

== League table ==
=== Standings ===
Pos	Team	Pld	W	D	L	GF	GA	GD	Pts	Promotion, qualification or relegation
1	Levante	8	6	1	1	27	15	+12	19	Promotion to Liga F
2	Alhama	8	5	1	2	12	6	+6	16	Qualification for Promotion play-offs
3	Villarreal	8	4	2	2	11	7	+4	14	Qualification for Promotion play-offs
4	Cacereño	8	4	1	3	10	9	+1	13	Qualification for Promotion play-offs
5	Atlético Madrid B (Note: Reserve team, ineligible for promotion)	8	4	1	3	18	20	−2	13	Qualification for Promotion play-offs
6	Athletic Club B	8	3	3	2	9	10	−1	12	
7	Sport Extremadura	8	3	3	2	7	11	−4	12	
8	Barcelona B	8	3	2	3	17	14	+3	11	
9	RU Tenerife	8	3	2	3	11	12	−1	11	
10	Osasuna	7	2	4	1	13	7	+6	10	
11	Albacete	9	2	1	6	14	16	−2	7	
12	Tenerife B	5	1	1	3	5	9	−4	4	
13	Real Sociedad B	7	1	1	5	4	12	−8	4	
14	Real Madrid B	8	0	3	5	12	22	−10	3	Relegation to Segunda Federación

Updated to match(es) played on 15 November 2026. Source: RFEF
Rules for classification: 1) Points; 2) Head-to-head points; 3) Goal difference; 4) Number of goals scored

=== Results ===
Home \ Away	ALB	ALH	ATH	ATM	BAR	CAC	LEV	OSA	RMA	RSO	RUT	SPO	TEN	VIL
Albacete					1–2		4–4			2–0	1–3		4–0	
Alhama	2–1		3–1				4–0	0–0						
Athletic Club B	1–0							0–6	5–0				1–0	
Atlético Madrid B	2–1	1–0			5–3		4–8							1–3
Barcelona B		2–0					0–3				1–1	6–0		
Cacereño				2–0				1–1			2–0	0–1		
Levante						3–0					3–1	2–2		
Osasuna					1–0				3–3					0–1
Real Madrid B		0–1		3–3	3–3	0–1								
Real Sociedad B			0–0	0–2		3–2	1–4							
RU Tenerife									3–2	1–0		1–1		1–2
Sport Extremadura			0–0					2–2		1–0				1–0
Tenerife B		1–2							3–1					1–1
Villarreal	2–0		1–1			1–2								

Updated to match(es) played on 21 November 2026. Source: RFEF
Legend: Blue = home team win; Yellow = draw; Red = away team win.

=== Positions by round ===
The table lists the positions of teams after each week of matches. In order to preserve chronological evolvements, any postponed matches are not included to the round at which they were originally scheduled, but added to the full round they were played immediately afterwards. Reserve teams are ineligible for promotion and play-offs.

Team ╲ Round	1	2	3	4	5	6	7	8
Levante	14	6	3	1	3	1	1	
Alhama	1	1	1	2	1	2	2	
Villarreal	9	3	5	8	9	8	3	
Cacereño	12	14	9	6	4	5	4	
Atlético Madrid B (Note: Reserve team, ineligible for promotion)	3	2	2	3	5	3	5	
Athletic Club B	10	4	6	9	8	7	6	
Sport Extremadura	11	9	11	7	7	4	7	
Barcelona B	6	13	12	10	10	10	8	
RU Tenerife	8	11	14	11	11	9	9	
Osasuna	4	8	4	4	2	6	10	
Albacete	13	5	8	6	6	11	11	
Tenerife B	7	12	7	12	12	12	12	
Real Sociedad B	2	7	10	13	13	13	13	
Real Madrid B	5	10	13	14	14	14	14	

Leader and promoted to 2027–28 Liga F
Qualified for Promotion play-offs
Relegated to 2027–28 Segunda Federación

Updated to match(es) played on 15 November 2026. Source: RFEF

== Season statistics ==
=== Top goalscorers ===
As of 15 November 2026

Rank	Player	Team	Goals
1	(Spain) Ari Arias	Levante	8
2	(Morocco) Kautar Azraf	Barcelona B	7
3	(Spain) Rocío De La Cruz	Atlético Madrid B	6
4	(Spain) Irati Martín	Athletic Club B	4
4	(Venezuela) Oriana Altuve	Alhama CF	4
6	(Spain) Nora de Torres	Osasuna	3
6	(Spain) Ángela Gálvez	Atlético Madrid B	3
6	(Spain) Marina Pérez	Osasuna	3
6	(Spain) Claudia Jiménez	Osasuna	3
6	(Spain) Aissatou Traore	Barcelona B	3
6	(Portugal) Dolores Silva	Levante	3
6	(Spain) Laura Ortega	Albacete	3
6	(Spain) Núria Escoms	Levante	3
6	(Spain) Cintia Hormigo	RU Tenerife	3
6	(Spain) Andrea López	RU Tenerife	3
6	(Spain) Noa Ortega	Atlético Madrid B	3
6	(Spain) Aixa Salvador	Villarreal	3
6	(Spain) Alba Rodao	Real Madrid B	3

=== Hat-tricks ===
Player	For	Against	Minutes	Score after goals	Result	Date	Matchday	Ref
(Spain) Ari Arias	Levante	Atlético Madrid B	45+1', 60', 88'	3–2, 3–4, 4–7	4–8 (A)	4 October 2026	4	
(Morocco) Kautar Azraf^{4}	Barcelona B	Sport Extremadura	12' (pen.), 83' (pen.), 85' (pen.), 90+2	1–0, 3–0, 4–0, 6–0	6–0 (H)	14 November 2026	8	
(Spain) Ari Arias	Levante	Real Sociedad B	38', 76', 83'	0–1, 1–2, 1–3	1–4 (A)	14 November 2026	8	
(Spain) Ana de Teresa	Albacete	Levante	23', 24', 55'	1–0, 2–0, 3–1	4–4 (H)	21 November 2026	9	

(H) – Home; (A) – Away
^{4} – Player scored four goals.

=== Clean sheets ===
As of 20 September 2026

Rank	Player	Club	Clean sheets
1	(Spain) Elene Aldekoa	Athletic Club B	2
1	(England) Chelsea Ashurst	Alhama	2
