= 2024–25 Copa de la Reina de Fútbol =

2024–2025 Copa de la Reina de Fútbol
Campeonato de España Copa de Su Majestad la Reina

Tournament details
- Country: Spain
- Teams: 48

Final positions
- Champions: Barcelona (11th title)
- Runners-up: Atlético Madrid

Tournament statistics
- Matches played: 49
- Goals scored: 157 (3.2 per match)
- Top goal scorer: Ewa Pajor (9) Barcelona

The 2024–25 Copa de la Reina de Fútbol was the 43rd edition of the Spanish women's association football national cup organized by the Royal Spanish Football Federation (RFEF).

Barcelona are the defending champions.

== Schedule and format ==
All ties are played in a single-match decider at the home ground of the lower division opponent, except for the semi-finals which will be a two-legged match. All matches ending in a tie will be decided in extra time; and if it persists, by a penalty shootout. The semi-finals will be a two-legged match to be played the first two weeks of March 2025. The final is set to be played on Saturday, 7 June 2025, at Estadio El Alcoraz, in Huesca.

Round	Draw date	Match date	Fixtures	Clubs	Format details
First round	9 August 2024	10–11 September 2024	16	32 → 16	Knock-out tournament type: Single match.
Second round	17 September 2024	1–3 October 2024	8	16 → 8	Knock-out tournament type: Single match.
Third round	17 October 2024	5–7 & 20 November 2024	8	16 → 8	Knock-out tournament type: Single match.
Round of 16	26 November 2024	21–22 December 2024	8	16 → 8	Knock-out tournament type: Single match.
Quarter-finals	17 January 2025	11–13 February 2025	4	8 → 4	Knock-out tournament type: Single match.
Semi-finals	18 February 2025	4–5 March 2025	2	4 → 2	Knock-out tournament type: Double match.
Semi-finals	18 February 2025	11–12 March 2025	2	4 → 2	Knock-out tournament type: Double match.
Final	18 February 2025	7 June 2025	1	2 → 1	Single match.

== First round ==
=== Draw ===
The draw was completed by the RFEF on 9 August 2024, at the Ciudad del Fútbol de Las Rozas in Madrid.

=== Matches ===
10 September 2024	CFF Albacete	0–7	Cacereño	Albacete
19:45 CEST (UTC+2)		Report	Anna 1'; María 26', 61'; Nerea 36'; Wakana 48'; Toro 84'; Lourdes 90'	Stadium: Municipal José Copete; Referee: Patricia Luna Varo

10 September 2024	Unión Viera	1–3	Guiniguada Apolinario	Las Palmas
21:00 CEST (UTC+2)	Naiala 17'	Report	Anabel 40'; Marta 46' (pen.); Gara 54'	Stadium: Alfonso Silva Stadium; Referee: Cándido Jesús Rodríguez Tavío

11 September 2024	Rayo Vallecano	0–0 (a.e.t.) (2–3 p)	Getafe	Madrid
11:00 CEST (UTC+2)		Report		Stadium: Ciudad Deportiva Fundación Rayo Vallecano; Referee: Nuria Sánchez García
	Penalties
	Maikerlin (penalty missed); Bruna (penalty missed); Brunda (penalty scored); M. Braojos (penalty scored); Iris (penalty missed)		Miriam L. (penalty scored); Jimena (penalty scored); Lara Sierra (penalty missed); Hernandez (penalty scored); Geral (penalty missed)

11 September 2024	Racing Santander	0–2	Osasuna	El Astillero
17:00 CEST (UTC+2)		Report	Celia 1'; Mendaza (red card); Guallar 72'	Stadium: La Planchada; Referee: Alejandra Raza Fernández

11 September 2024	Balears FC	1–1 (a.e.t.) (3–4 p)	AEM Lleida	Palma de Mallorca
18:00 CEST (UTC+2)	Sofía 15'	Report	Evelyn 88'	Stadium: Campo de Son Malferit; Referee: Beatriz Arregui Gamir
	Penalties
	Penalty scored Penalty missed		Penalty missed Penalty scored

11 September 2024	Pradejón	0–4	DUX Logroño	Pradejón
19:00 CEST (UTC+2)		Report	Marta M. 55'; Marta 74'; Iria 77'; Sonya 85'	Stadium: Municipal de Pradejón; Referee: Coral Couso Cuadrado

11 September 2024	Elche	1–3	Alhama	Elche
19:00 CEST (UTC+2)	Uxue 67'; Elisa (red card)	Report	Patri 7'; Vega 46'; Astrid 90'	Stadium: Diego Quiles; Referee: Alba Arija Asín

11 September 2024	Córdoba	2–1 (a.e.t.)	Málaga	Córdoba
19:15 CEST (UTC+2)	Fatima 89'; Lorena 104'	Report	Futu 87'	Stadium: Ciudad Deportiva Rafael Gómez; Referee: Eva Carmen Peregrin Ruiz

11 September 2024	Espanyol	1–0	Europa	Sant Adrià de Besòs
19:30 CEST (UTC+2)	Yle 86'	Report		Stadium: Ciutat Esportiva Dani Jarque; Referee: Amy Peñalver Pearce

11 September 2024	Bizkerre	0–4	Deportivo Alavés	Getxo
20:00 CEST (UTC+2)		Report	Tati 31'; Sara 56'; Monente 61'; Elene E. 82'	Stadium: Campo Bolue; Referee: Verónica González Sánchez

11 September 2024	Real Oviedo	2–4	Sporting Gijón	Oviedo
20:00 CEST (UTC+2)	Carlota 79', 83'	Report	Gines 7' (o.g.); Sonsoles 12'; Mayo 25'; Cueto 52'	Stadium: Carlos Tartiere; Referee: Elena Labra Fernández

11 September 2024	Zaragoza	1–0	Huesca	Zaragoza
20:00 CEST (UTC+2)	Spitler 90'	Report		Stadium: Centro Deportivo Municipal Mudéjar; Referee: Denise Alvarado

11 September 2024	La Solana	0–7	Albacete	La Solana
20:00 CEST (UTC+2)		Report	C. Gómez 11'; Albeta 30'; Mireya 42'; Paula M. 45+1'; Elsa 51'; Elena 57', 79'	Stadium: La Moheda; Referee: Raquel Suárez González

11 September 2024	Atlético Villalonga	0–1 (a.e.t.)	Deportivo La Coruña	Pontevedra
20:00 CEST (UTC+2)		Report	Millene 94'	Stadium: Novo San Pedro; Referee: Elena Peláez Arnillas

11 September 2024	Femarguín	3–1 (a.e.t.)	Juan Grande	Mogán
21:00 CEST (UTC+2)	Brenda 45'; Nadia 91'; Valeria 93'	Report	Adriana 90'	Stadium: Municipal Arguineguin; Referee: Domingo Miguel Sosa Gómez

11 September 2024	Real Unión de Tenerife	0–1 (a.e.t.)	Tenerife	Santa Cruz de Tenerife
21:00 CEST (UTC+2)		Report	A. Quintana 121'	Stadium: María Jiménez; Referee: Estilita González Pablique

== Second round ==
=== Draw ===
The draw was completed by the RFEF on 17 September 2024, at the Ciudad del Fútbol de Las Rozas in Madrid.

=== Matches ===
1 October 2024	Sporting Gijón	0–6	Deportivo La Coruña	Gijón
16:45 CEST (UTC+2)		Report	Altuve 42'; Carlota 52', 62'; Ana de Teresa 65', 68'; Millene 88'	Stadium: Mareo; Referee: Alicia Espinosa Ríos

2 October 2024	Tenerife	1–0	Getafe	San Cristóbal de La Laguna
16:00 CEST (UTC+2)	Mone 61'	Report		Stadium: Ciudad Deportiva Javier Pérez; Referee: Noelia Badia González

2 October 2024	Córdoba	0–4	Cacereño	Córdoba
17:30 CEST (UTC+2)		Report	Noko 11'; Rana 14'; Bárbara 90+3'; María 90+6'	Stadium: Ciudad Deportiva Rafael Gómez; Referee: Raquel Suárez González

2 October 2024	Zaragoza	0–5	Osasuna	Zaragoza
20:00 CEST (UTC+2)		Report	Herce 10'; Salinas 27'; Ainhoa 46'; Yiyi 76'; Jos 87'	Stadium: Centro Deportivo Municipal Mudéjar; Referee: Melissa López Osorio

3 October 2024	Alavés	2–4 (a.e.t.)	DUX Logroño	Vitoria-Gasteiz
16:00 CEST (UTC+2)	Carrillo 5' (pen.); Ines 59'	Report	Morcillo 20'; Sonya 90+1', 111'; Marta 104'	Stadium: Ciudad Deportiva José Luis Compañón; Referee: Sara Fernández Ceferino

3 October 2024	Guiniguada Apolinario	1–0	Femarguín	Las Palmas
18:30 CEST (UTC+2)	Laura 50'	Report		Stadium: Campo Parque Atlántico; Referee: José Elías Mendoza Godoy

3 October 2024	Alhama	0–1	Albacete	Alhama de Murcia
19:00 CEST (UTC+2)		Report	Elena 18'	Stadium: Campo Municipal José Kubala; Referee: Cristina Aguilera Manzano

3 October 2024	Espanyol	1–2 (a.e.t.)	AEM Lleida	Sant Adrià de Besòs
19:00 CEST (UTC+2)	Mar Torrás 7'	Report	M. Atiq 31'; M. Lara 108'	Stadium: Ciutat Esportiva Dani Jarque; Referee: Beatriz Cuesta Arribas

== Third round ==
=== Draw ===
The draw was completed by the RFEF on 17 October 2024, at the Ciudad del Fútbol de Las Rozas in Madrid.

=== Matches ===
5 November 2024	DUX Logroño	1–0	Eibar	Logroño
19:30 CEST (UTC+2)	Del Trecco 60'	Report		Stadium: Ciudad Deportiva Pradoviejo; Attendance: 400; Referee: Ylenia Sánchez Miguel

5 November 2024	Deportivo La Coruña	3–0	Real Betis	Abegondo
20:00 CEST (UTC+2)	Ana de Teresa 23'; Altuve 31'; Rodríguez 90'	Report		Stadium: Cidade Deportiva de Abegondo; Attendance: 300; Referee: Elisabeth Calvo Valentín

6 November 2024	Guiniguada Apolinario	1–4	UD Tenerife	Las Palmas
18:00 CEST (UTC+2)	Yanira 2' (pen.)	Report	Diki 49'; Blom 55'; Ainhoa 70'; Gift 90+1'	Stadium: Campo Parque Atlántico; Attendance: 800; Referee: Ainara Andrea Acevedo Dudley

6 November 2024	Osasuna	0–3	Levante Baladona	Pamplona
19:00 CEST (UTC+2)		Report	Maillo 28'; Martínez 51'; Sánchez 81'	Stadium: Tajonar; Attendance: 250; Referee: Zulema González González

7 November 2024	Albacete	0–1	Granada	Albacete
19:00 CEST (UTC+2)		Report	Pérez 1'	Stadium: Ciudad Deportiva Andrés Iniesta; Attendance: 200; Referee: Elia María Martínez Martínez

20 November 2024	AEM Lleida	1–1 (a.e.t.) (2–3 p)	Villarreal	Lleida
13:30 CEST (UTC+2)	Atiq 21'	Report	Enseñat 12'	Stadium: Recasens; Attendance: 600; Referee: Coral Couso Cuadrado
	Penalties
	Acosta (penalty scored); Villareal (penalty scored); Fernández (penalty missed); Atiq (penalty missed); Gestera (penalty missed)		(penalty scored) Vicente; (penalty missed) Pérez; (penalty missed) Riquelme; (penalty scored) Salvador; (penalty scored) Gil
Note: Matches originally scheduled for 7 November 2024, was postponed due to the 2024 Spain floods.

20 November 2024	Cacereño	1–0	Valencia	Cáceres
13:30 CEST (UTC+2)	Toro 50'	Report		Stadium: Manuel Sánchez Delgado; Attendance: 600; Referee: Lorena Trujilano
Note: Matches originally scheduled for 7 November 2024, was postponed due to the 2024 Spain floods.

20 November 2024	Tenerife	2–3	Sporting de Huelva	San Cristóbal de La Laguna
14:30 CEST (UTC+2)	Quintana 13'; Rodríguez 27'	Report	Guehai 81'; Albarran 84'; Yama 90+2'	Stadium: Ciudad Deportiva Javier Pérez; Attendance: 350; Referee: Nuria Sánchez García
Note: Matches originally scheduled for 6 November 2024, was postponed due to the 2024 Spain floods.

== Round of 16 ==
=== Draw ===
The draw was completed by the RFEF on 26 November 2024, at the Ciudad del Fútbol de Las Rozas in Madrid.

=== Matches ===
20 December 2024	Villarreal	0–2	Real Madrid	Villarreal
19:00 CET (UTC+1)		Report	Redondo 31'; Abelleira 62'	Stadium: Ciudad Deportiva Villarreal CF; Attendance: 850; Referee: Beatriz Cuesta Arribas

20 December 2024	Levante Badalona	0–1	Atlético Madrid	Badalona
20:45 CET (UTC+1)		Report	Benitez 54'	Stadium: Estadi Municipal de Badalona; Attendance: 417; Referee: Lorena Trujilano

21 December 2024	UD Tenerife	2–6	Barcelona	Adeje
13:00 CET (UTC+1)	Monday 41'; Zaremba 45+3'	Report	Paredes 20'; Pajor 24', 79' (pen.), 90+2'; Putellas 66' (pen.), 88'	Stadium: Campo municipal de fútbol de Adeje; Attendance: 1,374; Referee: Paola Cebollada López

21 December 2024	Sporting de Huelva	1–2	Levante UD	Huelva
15:30 CET (UTC+1)	Guehai 11'	Report	Chacón 23', 89'	Stadium: Ciudad Deportiva del Recreativo de Huelva; Attendance: 200; Referee: María Eugenia Gil Soriano

21 December 2024	Granada	4–2	Sevilla	Granada
17:30 CET (UTC+1)	Álvarez 11'; Imade 44'; Pérez 66', 70'	Report	Cerrato 39'; Moral 75'	Stadium: Nuevo Estadio de Los Cármenes; Attendance: 1,577; Referee: Marta Huerta de Aza

21 December 2024	DUX Logroño	2–4	Madrid CFF	Logroño
19:00 CET (UTC+1)	Keefe 2'; García 80'	Report	Carvalho 29'; McKenna 33'; Rylov 84'; López 89' (pen.)	Stadium: Ciudad Deportiva Pradoviejo; Attendance: 715; Referee: Olatz Rivera Olmedo

22 December 2024	Deportivo La Coruña	0–1	Real Sociedad	Abegondo
12:00 CET (UTC+1)		Report	Ramírez 49'	Stadium: Ciudad deportiva de Abegondo; Attendance: 600; Referee: Ainara Andrea Acevedo Dudley

22 December 2024	Cacereño	2–1	Athletic Club	Cáceres
13:00 CET (UTC+1)	Lezcano 4'; Díaz (yellow card) 15' (yellow-red card) 45+1'; Okuma 90+4'	Report	Amezaga 26' (pen.)	Stadium: Complejo Deportivo Manuel Sánchez Delgado; Attendance: 1,250; Referee: Zulema González González

== Quarter-finals ==
=== Draw ===
The draw was completed by the RFEF on 17 January 2025, at the Ciudad del Fútbol de Las Rozas in Madrid.

=== Matches ===
11 February 2025	Cacereño	0–2 (a.e.t.)	Atlético Madrid	Cáceres
19:00 CET (UTC+1)		Report	Ajibade 116'; Guijarro 120'	Stadium: Complejo Deportivo Manuel Sánchez Delgado; Attendance: 1,300; Referee: Beatriz Cuesta Arribas

12 February 2025	Madrid CFF	1–2	Barcelona	Fuenlabrada
19:00 CET (UTC+1)	Cometti 90+5'	Report	Pajor 6'; Torrejón 40'	Stadium: Estadio Fernando Torres; Attendance: 1,800; Referee: Elena Peláez Arnillas

13 February 2025	Levante UD	0–1	Granada	Buñol
19:00 CET (UTC+1)		Report	Postigo 40'	Stadium: Ciudad Deportiva de Buñol; Attendance: 137; Referee: Paola Cebollada López

13 February 2025	Real Madrid	3–1 (a.e.t.)	Real Sociedad	Madrid
21:00 CET (UTC+1)	Weir 22'; Toletti 95'; Caicedo 106'	Report	Sarriegi 45+1'	Stadium: Alfredo Di Stéfano Stadium; Attendance: 954; Referee: Zulema González González

== Semi-finals ==
=== Draw ===
The draw took place by the RFEF on 18 February 2025, at the Centro Deportivo Municipal Luis Aragonés in Madrid.

=== Summary ===
Team 1	Agg.	Team 2	1st leg	2nd leg
Granada	2–5	Atlético Madrid	0–2	2–3
Real Madrid	1–8	Barcelona	0–5	1–3

=== Matches ===
5 March 2025
18:30 CET (UTC+1)

Granada	0–2	Atlético Madrid
Requena (yellow card) 28'; Postigo (yellow card) 37'	Report	Estévez 14' (o.g.); Lloris (yellow card) 23'; García (yellow card) 56'; Gio 61'; Luany (yellow card) 90+5'

Nuevo Estadio de Los Cármenes, Granada
Attendance: 7,216
Referee: María Eugenia Gil Soriano
13 March 2025
19:30 CET (UTC+1)

Atlético Madrid	3–2	Granada
Gio 15', 53' (yellow card) 22'; Bøe Risa (yellow card) 44'; Lauren (yellow card) 47'; Medina (yellow card) 51'; Jensen 59'; García (yellow card) 90+2'	Report	Pérez (yellow card) 43'; Vignola 75'; Requena (yellow card) 77'; Gómez 87'

Centro Deportivo Wanda, Alcalá de Henares
Attendance: 751
Referee: María Gloria Planes Terol

6 March 2025
19:00 CET (UTC+1)

Real Madrid	0-5	Barcelona
	Report	Paralluelo 2', 42'; Pajor 14', 29', 78'; Rolfö (yellow card) 69'

Alfredo Di Stéfano Stadium, Madrid
Attendance: 2,185
Referee: Marta Huerta de Aza
12 March 2025
19:00 CET (UTC+1)

Barcelona	3–1	Real Madrid
Guijarro 24'; Pajor 48', 68'; Batlle (yellow card) 62'	Report	Méndez (yellow card) 32'; Carmona (yellow card) 35'; Bruun 90+2'

Johan Cruyff Stadium, Sant Joan Despí
Attendance: 3,689
Referee: Elena Peláez Arnillas

== Final ==
7 June 2025
19:00 CET (UTC+2)

Barcelona	2–0	Atlético Madrid
Pina 25', 74'	Report	Pinto (yellow card) 57'

Estadio El Alcoraz, Huesca
Attendance: 7,850
Referee: Marta Huerta de Aza

== Top goalscorers ==
As of 7 June 2025

Rank	Player	Club	Goals
1	(Poland) Ewa Pajor	Barcelona	9
2	(Chile) Sonya Keefe	DUX Logroño	4
3	(Spain) Elena Martínez	Albacete	3
3	(Spain) Laura Pérez Martín	Granada	3
3	(Spain) Ana de Teresa	Deportivo La Coruña	3
3	(Spain) María Macías	Cacereño	3
3	(Brazil) Gio Queiroz	Atlético Madrid	3
