= 2025–26 Primera Federación (women) =

Spanish women soccer 2nd division 25-26 season

Primera Federación
- Season: 2025–26
- Dates: 6 September 2025 – 2 May 2026
- Teams: 14 teams
- Champions: Barcelona B
- Promoted: Alavés; Valencia (through play-off)
- Relegated: Real Oviedo; Real Betis; Europa; SE AEM
- Matches: 182
- Goals: 448 (2.46 per match)
- Top goalscorer: Natalia Escot (15)
- All statistics correct as of 30 May 2026.

The 2025–26 Primera Federación FutFem was the 25th season of the second highest league tier of women's football in Spain, and the fourth under that name and using a single group format.

== Summary ==
14 teams took part in the league: 9 from the previous season, 2 relegated from the previous Liga F campaign (Valencia and Real Betis) and 3 promoted from the Segunda Federación (Europa, Real Oviedo and Tenerife B).

The winner (or the highest eligible club in the event of the champion being a reserve team) was promoted automatically to the 2026–27 season of Liga F with the next four eligible clubs entering a post-season play-off phase for a second spot. Four teams were relegated to the Segunda Federación league.

== Teams ==
=== Changes ===
The following teams changed division since the 2024–25 season.

To Primera Federación
▼ Relegated from Liga F
- Real Betis
- Valencia
▲ Promoted from Segunda Federación
- Europa
- Real Oviedo (Note: Promoted after playoffs win against UD Costa Adeje Tenerife B (not to be mistaken with Fundación Canaria CD Tenerife, who were promoted directly by finishing first in their group; The two Tenerife teams later merged to form one club, affiliated officially to CD Tenerife, with the A team competing in Liga F).)
- Tenerife B

From Primera Federación
▲ Promoted to Liga F
- Alhama
- DUX Logroño
▼ Relegated to Segunda Federación
- Atlético Baleares
- Getafe
- Sporting de Huelva

=== Stadium and location ===
Locations of teams in the 2025–26 Primera Federación
Locations of teams in the 2025–26 Primera Federación from Barcelona Province
Locations of teams in the 2025–26 Primera Federación from Canary Islands

Team	Location	Stadium	Capacity	2024–25 season
AEM	Lleida	Municipal de Recasens	900	3rd in Primera Federación
Alavés	Vitoria-Gasteiz	José Luis Compañón	2,500	2nd in Primera Federación
Albacete	Albacete	Andrés Iniesta	3,000	9th in Primera Federación
Atlético Madrid B	Alcalá de Henares	Centro Deportivo Wanda	2,700	11th in Primera Federación
Barcelona B	Sant Joan Despí	Ciutat Esportiva Joan Gamper	1,400	8th in Primera Federación
Cacereño	Cáceres	Manuel Sánchez Delgado	1,400	5th in Primera Federación
Europa^{↑}	Barcelona	Nou Sardenya	7,000	1st in Segunda Federación North Group
Osasuna	Pamplona	Tajonar Facilities	4,500	6th in Primera Federación
Real Betis^{↓}	Seville	Luis del Sol	1,318	15th in Liga F
Real Madrid B	Valdebebas	Ciudad Real Madrid	1,000	7th in Primera Federación
Real Oviedo^{↑}	Oviedo	Manuel Díaz Vega	5,000	Promotion play-off winner
UD Tenerife B^{↑}	Santa Cruz de Tenerife	Heliodoro Rodríguez López	22,824	1st in Segunda Federación South Group
Valencia^{↓}	Valencia	Paterna	3,000	16th in Liga F
Villarreal	Villarreal	Mini Estadi de Villarreal	3,500	10th in Primera Federación

^{↓}	Relegated from the Liga F
^{↑}	Promoted from the Segunda Federación

== League table ==
=== Standings ===
Pos	Team	Pld	W	D	L	GF	GA	GD	Pts	Promotion, qualification or relegation
1	Barcelona B (Note: Reserve team, ineligible for promotion) (C)	26	18	4	4	67	26	+41	58	
2	Alavés (P)	26	17	5	4	44	15	+29	56	Promotion to Liga F
3	Valencia (P)	26	12	10	4	35	18	+17	46	Qualification for Promotion play-offs
4	Real Madrid B	26	12	5	9	35	27	+8	41	
5	Tenerife B	26	11	6	9	34	36	−2	39	
6	Villarreal	26	10	8	8	35	31	+4	38	Qualification for Promotion play-offs
7	Osasuna	26	9	6	11	30	26	+4	33	Qualification for Promotion play-offs
8	Albacete	26	8	9	9	25	33	−8	33	Qualification for Promotion play-offs
9	Cacereño	26	8	7	11	22	33	−11	31	
10	Atlético Madrid B	26	8	7	11	26	32	−6	31	
11	AEM (R)	26	8	6	12	26	36	−10	30	Relegation to Segunda Federación
12	Europa (R)	26	6	5	15	29	47	−18	23	Relegation to Segunda Federación
13	Real Betis (R)	26	5	8	13	24	48	−24	23	Relegation to Segunda Federación
14	Real Oviedo (R)	26	4	6	16	18	42	−24	18	Relegation to Segunda Federación

Source: RFEF
Rules for classification: 1) Points; 2) Head-to-head points; 3) Goal difference; 4) Number of goals scored
(C) Champions; (P) Promoted; (R) Relegated to Segunda Federación

=== Results ===
Home \ Away	AEM	ALA	ALB	ATM	BAR	CAC	EUR	OSA	BET	RMA	OVI	TEN	VAL	VIL
AEM		1–3	3–0	1–0	2–2	0–0	1–0	1–0	0–1	0–1	1–0	1–3	0–0	1–2
Alavés	3–1		3–0	1–0	1–2	1–1	2–0	1–0	1–0	0–1	3–0	2–0	1–0	1–2
Albacete	1–1	0–1		0–2	2–2	2–0	1–0	0–3	5–1	0–0	1–0	0–0	2–1	1–0
Atlético Madrid B	2–1	0–2	3–0		2–3	0–2	1–1	1–1	3–0	1–0	1–1	0–1	0–0	1–1
Barcelona B	5–0	2–3	1–2	2–0		4–0	5–0	1–0	1–1	3–0	4–1	4–1	0–0	1–0
Cacereño	2–1	0–0	1–1	0–1	1–5		2–0	1–3	1–0	1–0	1–0	1–1	0–1	0–0
Europa	1–0	0–4	2–0	3–1	1–3	2–3		0–1	2–0	3–0	2–2	2–0	1–2	1–1
Osasuna	1–2	1–1	1–1	2–0	1–2	1–0	4–1		2–1	3–2	3–0	1–1	0–0	0–2
Real Betis	2–2	0–5	1–1	2–2	1–5	3–1	3–1	0–0		0–3	1–1	1–2	0–0	1–1
Real Madrid B	1–1	1–1	2–1	2–0	2–1	1–2	2–0	2–0	5–1		2–0	2–1	0–1	1–1
Real Oviedo	0–1	0–1	0–1	0–0	2–4	2–1	1–1	1–0	0–1	2–1		2–0	0–3	1–4
Tenerife B	2–1	0–1	0–0	1–2	1–0	1–0	2–2	2–1	2–1	2–1	4–2		2–2	1–2
Valencia	4–2	1–1	2–0	4–1	1–2	2–0	3–2	1–0	0–1	1–1	0–0	3–0		1–0
Villarreal	0–1	2–1	2–2	1–2	1–3	1–1	3–1	2–1	2–1	1–2	1–0	1–3	2–2	

Source: RFEF
Legend: Blue = home team win; Yellow = draw; Red = away team win.

=== Positions by round ===
The table lists the positions of teams after each week of matches. In order to preserve chronological evolvements, any postponed matches are not included to the round at which they were originally scheduled, but added to the full round they were played immediately afterwards. Reserve teams are ineligible for promotion and play-offs.

Team ╲ Round	1	2	3	4	5	6	7	8	9	10	11	12	13	14	15	16	17	18	19	20	21	22	23	24	25	26
Barcelona B (Note: Reserve team, ineligible for promotion)	5	2	4	7	4	3	2	1	1	2	2	2	1	2	2	2	2	1	1	1	1	1	1	1	1	1
Alavés	6	4	2	2	1	1	1	2	2	1	1	1	2	1	1	1	1	2	2	2	2	2	2	2	2	2
Valencia	1	3	3	3	5	4	4	4	4	3	3	3	3	3	3	3	3	3	3	3	3	3	3	3	3	3
Real Madrid B	7	9	9	5	6	7	10	8	10	9	6	5	5	5	5	4	4	5	5	6	5	5	4	4	4	4
Tenerife B	2	7	5	8	8	9	7	7	7	7	7	7	6	6	6	6	6	6	6	7	7	7	6	6	5	5
Villarreal	12	11	7	4	3	2	3	3	3	5	5	4	4	4	4	5	5	4	4	4	4	4	5	5	6	6
Osasuna	13	6	10	11	10	6	6	5	5	4	4	6	7	8	7	7	7	7	7	5	6	6	7	7	7	7
Albacete	4	8	6	6	9	10	8	10	8	8	9	9	8	7	8	8	9	9	8	8	8	8	9	8	8	8
Atlético Madrid B	3	1	1	1	2	5	5	6	6	6	8	8	9	9	9	9	8	8	9	9	9	9	8	9	11	9
Cacereño	8	12	12	10	7	8	9	11	9	10	10	10	11	10	10	13	11	10	10	10	11	12	11	11	10	10
AEM	9	13	11	12	13	14	13	13	14	14	14	14	13	12	11	10	12	12	11	11	10	10	10	10	9	11
Europa	10	14	14	14	14	13	14	14	12	12	11	11	14	14	14	14	10	12	12	12	12	13	13	13	13	12
Real Betis	11	10	13	13	12	12	11	9	11	11	12	13	12	13	12	11	13	13	13	13	13	11	12	12	12	13
Real Oviedo	14	5	8	9	11	11	12	12	13	13	13	12	10	11	13	12	14	14	14	14	14	14	14	14	14	14

Leader and promoted to 2026–27 Liga F
Qualified for Promotion play-offs
Relegated to 2026–27 Segunda Federación

Source: RFEF

== Season statistics ==
=== Top goalscorers ===
As of 2 May 2026, not including promotion play-offs

Rank	Player	Team	Goals
1	(Spain) Natalia Escot	Barcelona B	15
2	(Spain) Naiara Sanmartín	Real Madrid B	14
2	(Spain) Aixa Salvador	Villarreal	14
4	(Spain) Celia Segura	Barcelona B	10
4	(Spain) Laia Martret	Barcelona B	10
6	(Spain) Claudia Jiménez	Osasuna	9
6	(Spain) Adriana Méndez	Tenerife B	9
8	(Spain) Rosalía Domínguez	Barcelona B	8
8	(Spain) Carmen Sobrón	Alavés	8
10	(Norway) Martine Fenger	Barcelona B	7
10	(Puerto Rico) Danielle Marcano	Valencia	7
10	(Spain) Noelia Salazar	Tenerife B	7
10	(Spain) Noa Ortega	Atlético Madrid B	7
10	(Spain) Ainhoa Guallar Machín	Alavés	7

=== Clean sheets ===
As of 2 May 2026

Rank	Player	Club	Clean sheets
1	(Spain) Sofía Fuente	Alavés	14
2	(Spain) Jana Xin	Valencia	11
3	(Spain) Alba de Isidro	Atlético Madrid B	7

== Promotion play-offs ==
=== Bracket ===
Semi-finals
7	Osasuna	1	1	2
6	Villarreal	2	3	5
8	Albacete	0	3	3
3	Valencia	0	4	4

Final
Villarreal	0	1	1
Valencia	0	1	1

=== Matches ===
Semi-finals 1

9 May 2026 First leg	Osasuna	1–2	Villarreal	Aranguren
16:00 CEST	Jiménez 90'	Report	Lauris 44'; María 86'	Stadium: Tajonar Facilities; Attendance: 650; Referee: Ágata López García

17 May 2026 Second leg	Villarreal	3–1	Osasuna	Villarreal
20:00 CEST	Medina 21'; Macías 45'; Salvador 83'	Report	Jiménez 75'	Stadium: Ciudad Deportiva Villarreal CF; Referee: Florencia Andrea Muñoz

Semi-finals 2

10 May 2026 First leg	Albacete	0–0	Valencia	Albacete
12:00 CEST		Report	Elloh (red card) 90'	Stadium: Ciudad Deportiva Andrés Iniesta; Attendance: 800; Referee: Alba Arija Asín

17 May 2026 Second leg	Valencia	4–3	Albacete	Paterna
12:00 CEST	Marcano 21'; Martí 29'; Mascarell 33'; Martín (red card) 42'; Mrabet 48'	Report	Ortega 35', 90+2' (pen.); Moreno 67'	Stadium: Ciudad Deportiva de Paterna; Attendance: 1,016; Referee: Arantza Gallastegui Pérez

Final

23 May 2026 First leg	Villarreal	0–0	Valencia	Villarreal
18:00 CEST		Report		Stadium: Ciudad Deportiva Villarreal CF; Attendance: 2,050; Referee: Beatriz Arregui Gamir

30 May 2026 Second leg	Valencia	1–1 (a.e.t.)	Villarreal	Paterna
18:00 CEST	Monente 90+10'	Report	Salvador 21'	Stadium: Ciudad Deportiva de Paterna; Referee: Josefa Sánchez Gómez
Note: Per regulations, Valencia is promoted to Liga F after extra-time (with no penalty shoot-out) by having finished above Villarreal during the League competition.

== Number of teams by autonomous community ==
Rank	Autonomous Community	Number	Teams
1	Catalonia	3	AEM, Barcelona B, and Europa
2	(Community of Madrid) Madrid	2	Atlético Madrid B and Real Madrid B
2	(Valencian Community) Valencia	2	Valencia and Villarreal
4	Andalusia	1	Real Betis
4	Asturias	1	Real Oviedo
4	(Basque Country (autonomous community)) Basque	1	Alavés
4	Canary Islands	1	Tenerife B
4	Castilla–La Mancha	1	Albacete
4	Extremadura	1	Cacereño
4	Navarre	1	Osasuna
