= Women's Clásico =

Name for FC Barcelona Femení and Real Madrid CF Femenino rivalry

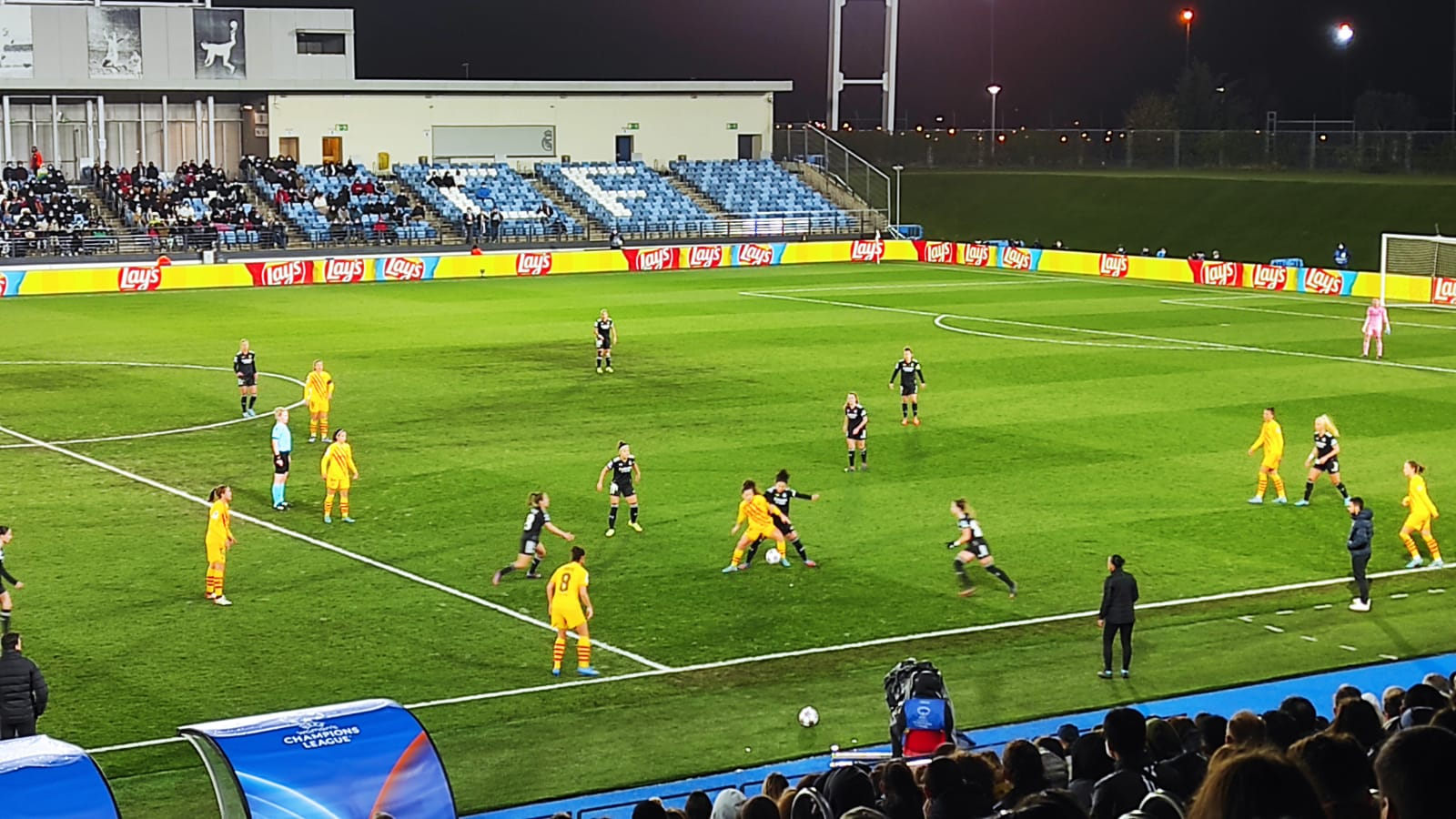
- A women's Clásico played at Estadio Alfredo Di Stéfano in 2022
- Native name: El Clásico femenino (Spanish); El Clàssic femení (Catalan)
- Location: Spain
- Teams: Barcelona; Real Madrid
- First meeting: 4 October 2020; Primera División; Real Madrid 0–4 Barcelona
- Latest meeting: 4 October 2026; 2026–27 Liga F Barcelona 7 Real Madrid 0
- Stadiums: Estadi Johan Cruyff (Barcelona); Estadio Alfredo Di Stéfano (Real Madrid)

Statistics
- Total meetings: 26 (official)
- Most wins: Barcelona (25)
- Most player appearances: Misa Rodríguez (25)
- Top scorer: Alexia Putellas (15); Ewa Pajor (15)
- All-time series: Barcelona: 25; Real Madrid: 1
- Largest victory: Barcelona 7 Real Madrid 0; 2026–27 Liga F (4 October 2026)
- Longest win streak: 18 matches Barcelona (2020–2025)

The Women's Clásico, or women's El Clásico (also in all lowercase letters), natively Spanish: El Clásico femenino and Catalan: El Clàssic femení, is the women's association football rivalry between Liga F teams Barcelona and Real Madrid. It originates in the equivalent men's football rivalry, though does not share the same history. Barcelona has won all but one of the official women's Clásico matches since 2020; Real Madrid achieved their first win in the fixture in March 2025 to end their rivals' run of 18 consecutive victories.

== History ==
The men's El Clásico is a passionate rivalry, and this has also extended to women's football, although Real Madrid Femenino was only founded in 2020 whereas FC Barcelona Femení is more than 30 years older and has been one of Spain's leading clubs since the 2010s. The second leg of the UEFA Women's Champions League quarter-finals between the clubs at Camp Nou on 30 March 2022 was attended by 91,553 spectators; at the time, this was the largest known confirmed attendance for any women's football match (the 1971 Mexico–Denmark game with unconfirmed 110,000 would otherwise be a record). Reigning continental champions Barcelona won 5–2 on the day and 8–3 on aggregate. The attendance was later surpassed in Barcelona's next Champions League match, the semi-finals first leg against VfL Wolfsburg, held at Camp Nou.

Due to Real Madrid being such a new club, for the first few years of its existence, the Clásico between the women's sides was questionable, especially as these years also marked a golden generation of Barcelona's women's team, with few other clubs able to come close. However, Real Madrid's rapid improvement saw them quickly become one of the best teams in Spain, and a more worthy opponent for Barcelona. The record attendance in March 2022 marked the moment a real sense of rivalry was felt, though both clubs indicated that they also wanted to work together to help women's football grow. Off-the-pitch affairs have further contributed to a rivalry; since mid-2022, several top Spanish women's teams, prominently Barcelona, have openly rejected the governing body (RFEF), with Real Madrid being one of few teams to stay on side with the RFEF.

== Team summaries ==
- Numbers with this background indicate the record in the competition.

Barcelona	Competition	Real Madrid
Domestic
11 (Note: 2011–12, 2012–13, 2013–14, 2014–15, 2019–20, 2020–21, 2021–22, 2022–23, 2023–24, 2024–25, 2025–26)	Primera División	—
12 (Note: 1994, 2011, 2013, 2014, 2017, 2018, 2019–20, 2020–21, 2021–22, 2023–24, 2024–25, 2025–26)	Copa de la Reina	—
6 (Note: 2019–20, 2021–22, 2022–23, 2023–24, 2024–25, 2025–26)	Supercopa de España	—
29	Aggregate	0
European
4 (Note: 2020–21, 2022–23, 2023–24, 2025–26)	UEFA Women's Champions League	—
4	Aggregate	0
33	Total aggregate	0

== Players who have played for both clubs ==
- (Mexico) Kenti Robles (Barcelona: 2011–2014, Real Madrid: 2020–2024)
- (Spain) Marta Corredera (Barcelona: 2010–2015, Real Madrid: 2020–2023)
- (Spain) Ariana Arias (Real Madrid: 2019–2022, Barcelona: 2022–2024)

== Matches ==
=== Liga F Moeve ===
No.	Date	R.	Home team	Away team	Score (FT/HT)	Goals (home)	Goals (away)
1	4 October 2020	1	Real Madrid	Barcelona	0–4 (0–1)		Guijarro (19), Misa (55 o.g.), Martens (66), Putellas (75)
2	31 January 2021	18	Barcelona	Real Madrid	4–1 (3–0)	Putellas (14), Hermoso (23), Oshoala (37, 70)	Carmona (81 p.)
3	12 December 2021	13	Real Madrid	Barcelona	1–3 (0–3)	Asllani (52)	Martens (8, 23), Paredes (18)
4	13 March 2022	24	Barcelona	Real Madrid	5–0 (2–0)	Putellas (41, 43), Guijarro (60), Peter (65 o.g.), Hermoso (82)	
5	6 November 2022	8	Real Madrid	Barcelona	0–4 (0–2)		Crnogorčević (4), Guijarro (43), Gálvez (52 o.g.), Rolfö (81)
6	25 March 2023	23	Barcelona	Real Madrid	1–0 (0–0)	Rolfö (77 p.)	
7	19 November 2023	9	Barcelona	Real Madrid	5–0 (3–0)	Bonmatí (17), Hansen (43), Caldentey (45+1), Pina (90+1), Vicky (90+3)	
8	24 March 2024	21	Real Madrid	Barcelona	0–3 (0–1)		Rolfö (10), Bonmatí (55), Hansen (67)
9	16 November 2024	10	Real Madrid	Barcelona	0–4 (0–3)		Guijarro (4, 22), Pina (39), Putellas (86)
10	23 March 2025	23	Barcelona	Real Madrid	1–3 (0–1)	Hansen (67)	Redondo (41), Weir (87, 90+6)
11	15 November 2025	11	Barcelona	Real Madrid	4–0 (2–0)	Pajor (15, 30), Schertenleib (90+1), Bonmatí (90+3)	
12	29 March 2026	24	Real Madrid	Barcelona	0–3 (0–1)		Batlle (18), Putellas (51), Lakrar (55 o.g.)
13	4 October 2026	6	Barcelona	Real Madrid	7–0 (5–0)	Pina (4, 28, 32, 45), Hansen (33), Pajor (55), Schertenleib (88)	
14	21 February 2027	21	Real Madrid	Barcelona			

==== Summary ====
Barcelona wins	12
Draws	0
Real Madrid wins	1
Barcelona goals	48
Real Madrid goals	5
Total matches	13

Team	Home wins	Home draws	Home losses
FC Barcelona Femení	6	0	1
Real Madrid Femenino	0	0	6

=== Copa de la Reina ===
Season	Round		Home team	Away team	Score (FT/HT)	Goals (home)	Goals (away)
2021–22	Semi-finals		Barcelona	Real Madrid	4–0 (1–0)	Martens (19), Bonmatí (47), Caldentey (52), Oshoala (75)	
2024–25	Semi-finals	First leg	Real Madrid	Barcelona	0–5 (0–4)		Paralluelo (2, 42), Pajor (13, 29, 78)
2024–25	Semi-finals	Second leg	Barcelona	Real Madrid	3–1 (1–0)	Guijarro (24), Pajor (48, 68)	Bruun (90+1)
2025–26	Quarter-finals		Real Madrid	Barcelona	0–4 (0–1)		Putellas (21), Pajor (67, 81), Paralluelo (73)

==== Summary ====
FCB Femení wins	4
Draws	0
RM Femenino wins	0
FCB Femení goals	16
RM Femenino goals	1
Total matches	4

Team	Home wins	Home draws	Home losses	Other venue wins
FC Barcelona Femení	1	0	0	1
Real Madrid Femenino	0	0	2	0

=== Supercopa de España Femenina ===
Season	Round	Home team	Away team	Score (FT/HT)	Goals (home)	Goals (away)
2021–22	Semi-finals	Barcelona	Real Madrid	1–0 (0–0)	Putellas (90+1)	
2022–23	Semi-finals	Barcelona	Real Madrid	3–1 (a.e.t.)	Pina (24), Caldentey (111 p.), Paralluelo (120)	Weir (54)
2023–24	Semi-finals	Barcelona	Real Madrid	4–0 (3–0)	Caldentey (12, 39 p.), Paralluelo (15, 52)	
2024–25	Final	Barcelona	Real Madrid	5–0 (3–0)	Hansen (31), Pajor (37, 45+4), Guijarro (62), Putellas (85)	
2025–26	Final	Barcelona	Real Madrid	2–0 (1–0)	Brugts (28), Putellas (90+3 p.)	

==== Summary ====
Barcelona wins	5
Draws	0
Real Madrid wins	0
Barcelona goals	15
Real Madrid goals	1
Total matches	5

Team	Home wins	Home draws	Home losses	Other venue wins
FC Barcelona Femení	0	0	0	5
Real Madrid Femenino	0	0	0	0

=== UEFA Women's Champions League ===
Season	Round		Home team	Away team	Score (FT/HT)	Goals (home)	Goals (away)
2021–22	Quarter-finals	First leg	Real Madrid	Barcelona	1–3 (1–0)	Carmona (8)	Putellas (53 p., 90+4), Pina (81)
2021–22	Quarter-finals	Second leg	Barcelona	Real Madrid	5–2 (1–1)	León (8), Bonmatí (52), Pina (55), Putellas (62), Hansen (70)	Carmona (16 p.), Zornoza (48)
2025–26	Quarter-finals	First leg	Real Madrid	Barcelona	2–6 (1–3)	Caicedo (30, 66)	Pajor (6, 57), Brugts (13), Paredes (32), Vicky (64), Putellas (89 p.)
2025–26	Quarter-finals	Second leg	Barcelona	Real Madrid	6–0 (4–0)	Putellas (8), Hansen (15, 55), Paredes (27), Pajor (34), Brugts (74)	

==== Summary ====
Barcelona wins	4
Draws	0
Real Madrid wins	0
Barcelona goals	20
Real Madrid goals	5
Total matches	4

Team	Home wins	Home draws	Home losses	Other venue wins
FC Barcelona Femení	2	0	0	0
Real Madrid Femenino	0	0	2	0

=== Summary of all competitive matches ===
Barcelona wins	25
Draws	0
Real Madrid wins	1
Barcelona goals	99
Real Madrid goals	12
Total matches	26

Team	Home wins	Home draws	Home losses	Other venue wins
FC Barcelona Femení	9	0	1	6
Real Madrid Femenino	0	0	10	0

== Top scorers ==
As of 4 October 2026

#	Player	Goals	Liga F	Copa	Supercopa	Europe	Total
1	(Spain) Alexia Putellas	Barcelona (15)	6	1	3	5	15
1	(Poland) Ewa Pajor	Barcelona (15)	3	7	2	3	15
3	(Spain) Clàudia Pina	Barcelona (9)	6	—	1	2	9
4	(Norway) Caroline Graham Hansen	Barcelona (8)	4	—	1	3	8
5	(Spain) Patricia Guijarro	Barcelona (7)	5	1	1	—	7
6	(Spain) Salma Paralluelo	Barcelona (6)	—	3	3	—	6
7	(Spain) Mariona Caldentey	Barcelona (5)	1	1	3	—	5
7	(Spain) Aitana Bonmatí	Barcelona (5)	3	1	—	1	5
9	(Netherlands) Lieke Martens	Barcelona (4)	3	1	—	—	4
10	(Netherlands) Esmee Brugts	Barcelona (3)	—	—	1	2	3
10	(Spain) Olga Carmona	Real Madrid (3)	1	—	—	2	3
10	(Nigeria) Asisat Oshoala	Barcelona (3)	2	1	—	—	3
10	(Spain) Irene Paredes	Barcelona (3)	1	—	—	2	3
10	(Sweden) Fridolina Rolfö	Barcelona (3)	3	—	—	—	3
10	(Scotland) Caroline Weir	Real Madrid (3)	2	—	1	—	3

== Reserve teams matches (women) ==
No.	Date	R.	Home team	Away team	Score (FT/HT)	Goals (home)	Goals (away)
1	20 December 2024	8	Barcelona B	Real Madrid B	1–1 (0–0)	Pujols (49)	Martín (54)
2	27 April 2025	26	Real Madrid B	Barcelona B	3–1 (2–0)	Martín (22), Noemi (32), Comendador (56)	Fenger (52)
3	27 September 2025	4	Real Madrid B	Barcelona B	2–1 (2–0)	Ashley (1), Naiara (30)	Escot (90+1)
4	25 April 2026	25	Barcelona B	Real Madrid B	3–0 (2–0)	Martret (6), Segura (40), Domínguez (76)	
5	18 October 2026	5	Real Madrid B	Barcelona B	3–3 (1–2)	Oihane (15), Vélez (49), Zuazo (54)	Nielsen (6), Arufe (22), Traoré (76)
6	24 January 2027	14	Barcelona B	Real Madrid B			

=== Summary ===
Barcelona B wins	1
Draws	2
Real Madrid B wins	2
Barcelona B goals	9
Real Madrid B goals	9
Total matches	5

Team	Home wins	Home draws	Home losses
FC Barcelona B Femení	1	1	0
Real Madrid B Femenino	2	1	0
