= Silvia Cristóbal =

Spanish footballer (born 2008)

Personal information
- Full name: Silvia Cristóbal Fernández
- Date of birth: 1 May 2008 (age 18)
- Place of birth: Madrid, Spain
- Position: Defender

Team information
- Current team: Real Madrid
- Number: 4

Youth career
- 2014–2018: ED Moratalaz
- 2018–2021: Madrid CFF
- 2021–2024: Real Madrid

Senior career*
Years	Team	Apps	(Gls)
2024–2026	Real Madrid B	18	(1)
2025–	Real Madrid	12	(1)

International career^{‡}
2023–2025	Spain U17	24	(6)
2024–	Spain U19	13	(0)
2026–	Spain U20	7	(0)
Medal record
Women's football
Representing Spain
FIFA U-20 Women's World Cup
Winner	2026 Poland
UEFA Women's Under-19 Championship
Winner	2026 Bosnia and Herzegovina
UEFA Women's Under-17 Championship
Winner	2024 Sweden
- * Club domestic league appearances and goals as of 02:53, 11 July 2026 (UTC) ‡ National team caps and goals as of 00:14, 28 September 2026 (UTC)

Silvia Cristóbal Fernández (born 1 May 2008) is a Spanish professional footballer who plays as a defender for Liga F club Real Madrid.

== Club career ==
=== Youth career ===
Cristóbal started her career playing for ED Moratalaz. After spending three years in the Madrid CFF academy, she joined Real Madrid in 2021, as part of the 'cadete' group.

=== Real Madrid ===
Cristóbal showed good progress in Real Madrid's youth ranks, leading to her debut for the B team in 2024. On 12 April 2025, she made her first team debut, coming on as a half-time substitute for Maëlle Lakrar. At the time of her debut, she was the fifth youngest player to play for the team. She scored her first goal for the senior team on 8 November 2025, part of a 5–0 win against Alhama.

On 15 July 2026, Cristóbal was promoted to the first team and signed a contract until 2030.

== International career ==
Cristóbal has played in the U-15, U-16, U-17, U-19, and U-20 levels of the Spain women's national team.

She was part of the Spain U-17 squad that won the 2024 UEFA Women's Under-17 Championship in Sweden, beating England 4-0 in the final. The next year, she was also part of the Spanish U-17 squad that played in the 2025 UEFA Women's Under-17 Championship. She was named in the Team of the Tournament for her performances throughout the tournament, despite Spain not advancing past the group stage. Later that year, she served as team captain at the 2025 FIFA U-17 Women's World Cup

In 2026, she was selected as part of the Spain U-19 team that went on to win the 2026 UEFA Women's Under-19 Championship. Later that year, Cristóbal was selected for the Spain U-20 squad that won the 2026 FIFA U-20 Women's World Cup. She was named Player of the Match in the final.

== Career statistics ==
As of 10 July 2026

Appearances and goals by club, season and competition
Club	Season	League			Copa de la Reina		Continental		Other		Total	
Club	Season	Division	Apps	Goals	Apps	Goals	Apps	Goals	Apps	Goals	Apps	Goals
Real Madrid B	2024–25	Primera Federación	11	0	—		—		—		11	0
Real Madrid B	2025–26	Primera Federación	7	1	—		—		—		7	1
Real Madrid B	Total		18	1	—		—		—		18	1
Real Madrid	2024–25	Liga F	1	0	0	0	0	0	0	0	1	0
Real Madrid	2025–26	Liga F	11	1	0	0	2 (Note: Appearances in UEFA Women's Champions League)	0	0	0	13	1
Real Madrid	Total		12	1	0	0	2	0	0	0	14	1
Career total			30	2	0	0	2	0	0	0	32	2

== Honours ==
Spain U17

- UEFA Women's Under-17 Championship: 2024

Spain U19

- UEFA Women's Under-19 Championship: 2026

Spain U20

- FIFA U-20 Women's World Cup: 2026

Individual

- UEFA Women's Under-17 Championship Team of the Tournament: 2025
