= 2022–23 Primera Federación (women) =

Primera Federación
- Season: 2022–23
- Teams: 16 teams
- Champions: Barcelona B
- Promoted: Eibar; Granada
- Relegated: Rayo Vallecano; Granadilla Tenerife B Real Oviedo; Córdoba; Juan Grande

The 2022–23 Primera Federación FutFem was the 22nd season of the second highest league tier of women's football in Spain, and the first under that name and using a single group format.

== Summary ==
16 teams took part in the league: 14 from the second tier's previous two-group format under the Segunda División Pro name (7 from each group) and 2 relegated from the previous Primera División (also now renamed, to Liga F), namely three-time national champions Rayo Vallecano who had not been out of the top flight since 2002–03, and Eibar after a two-year spell.

The winners were to be promoted to Liga F automatically and another via play-offs between the 2nd and 5th placed teams. In the event, Barcelona B won the division but were ineligible to be promoted due to being the reserve team of top-tier champions Barcelona. The promotion actions were passed down, with Eibar going up automatically and 6th placed Cacereño entering the play-offs, which were won by Granada for only a second season in the top division in their history after (2013–14).

Five teams (more than the planned usual quota of three due to the intention to reduce the league to 14 participants) were relegated to the third tier Segunda Federación, including Rayo Vallecano who endured a second successive demotion; Athletic Club B escaping by a point on the final match day, finishing with a sequence of five victories having been in one of the bottom four places at the end of every other round of fixtures.

However, Rayo indicated they would seek to have the reduction from 16 to 14 teams cancelled as it was not properly announced by the RFEF, negating their relegation and that of Granadilla Tenerife B. Their appeal to the federation was still awaiting a decision in September 2023 with the new season fast approaching – the clubs publicly expressed their suspicion that their issue had been neglected while the RFEF focused on the Rubiales affair. The new season's fixtures began as scheduled on 9 September without involvement of the appellants, who played their opening matches in the Segunda Federación a day later.

== Table ==
Promoted	Promotion play-offs	Relegated

	Team	P	W	D	L	GF	GA	GD	Pts
1	Barcelona B (Note: Reserve team, ineligible for promotion)	30	18	5	7	58	31	27	59
2	Eibar	30	13	14	3	31	18	13	53
3	Deportivo Abanca	30	15	8	7	52	29	23	53
4	Osasuna	30	14	10	6	42	23	19	52
5	Granada	30	14	8	8	40	28	12	50
6	Cacereño	30	13	9	8	34	28	6	48
7	AEM	30	14	5	11	35	30	5	47
8	DUX Logroño	30	11	10	9	42	38	4	43
9	Espanyol	30	10	10	10	38	35	3	40
10	Fundación Albacete	30	9	10	11	32	32	0	37
11	Athletic Club B	30	11	3	16	34	51	-17	36
12	Rayo Vallecano	30	9	8	13	31	45	-14	35
13	Granadilla Tenerife B	30	9	7	14	24	37	-13	34
14	Real Oviedo	30	7	6	17	28	45	-17	27
15	Córdoba	30	6	6	18	27	48	-21	24
16	Juan Grande	30	4	7	19	24	54	-30	19

Source: RFEF

== Results grid ==
Home \ Away	ALB	ATH	BAR	CAC	COR	DEP	EIB	ESP	GRA	JUA	LLE	LOG	OSA	OVI	RAY	TEN
Fundación Albacete	—	2–0	4–0	1–0	0–0	2–3	1–1	0–0	0–1	2–1	3–2	0–2	0–0	4–0	1–1	0–1
Athletic Club B	3–0	—	0–3	1–3	0–2	0–3	0–1	3–4	1–0	3–1	1–0	1–0	3–3	0–1	2–0	1–0
Barcelona B	4–1	3–0	—	1–1	2–0	1–0	2–0	3–2	1–1	5–1	3–0	2–2	1–2	2–1	3–1	2–0
Cacereño	0–1	1–3	0–2	—	1–0	4–0	1–2	0–0	2–1	2–2	1–1	2–2	1–0	2–1	3–2	1–0
Córdoba	2–0	2–2	1–1	1–1	—	1–1	0–1	0–2	1–2	4–1	1–0	1–2	0–3	3–0	0–2	0–5
Deportivo Abanca	2–1	2–1	0–3	0–2	3–1	—	1–1	4–0	2–2	6–2	1–0	3–0	3–0	1–2	4–0	4–0
Eibar	1–1	3–1	2–0	2–1	2–0	1–0	—	0–0	1–1	0–0	0–1	1–1	0–1	1–0	2–0	0–0
Espanyol	0–1	3–0	1–2	0–0	2–0	2–2	1–1	—	1–3	0–0	0–0	1–1	0–0	4–0	3–0	2–1
Granada	2–1	2–0	2–3	0–1	1–0	0–1	0–0	2–0	—	3–0	2–0	3–3	1–1	1–0	2–1	0–1
Juan Grande	0–0	1–2	0–2	0–1	0–3	1–1	0–1	1–3	1–2	—	2–0	1–0	1–2	1–1	1–1	1–0
AEM	2–0	2–0	2–0	0–0	3–1	1–0	1–1	2–0	1–0	2–0	—	1–2	1–5	3–1	0–1	4–0
DUX Logroño	1–1	5–0	2–2	2–1	4–1	0–0	0–1	1–2	1–2	1–0	0–2	—	0–3	2–1	1–1	2–1
Osasuna	1–1	1–0	1–0	0–0	2–0	0–1	0–1	3–2	2–0	3–4	3–0	0–1	—	2–0	0–0	0–0
Real Oviedo	1–1	0–2	3–2	0–1	1–0	1–1	1–1	3–0	0–2	2–1	0–1	2–2	1–1	—	0–1	4–0
Rayo Vallecano	1–0	2–2	0–3	3–0	3–1	0–3	1–1	0–2	1–1	1–0	2–2	0–1	1–3	2–1	—	3–1
Granadilla Tenerife B	0–3	1–2	1–0	0–1	1–1	0–0	2–2	2–1	1–1	1–0	0–1	2–1	0–0	1–0	2–0	—

Source: RFEF
Legend: Blue = home team win; Yellow = draw; Red = away team win.

== Promotion play-offs ==
- Semi-finals

20 May 2023	Granada	2–0	Osasuna
		Report

27 May 2023	Osasuna	0–3	Granada
		Report

- Granada win 5–0 on aggregate.

21 May 2023	Cacereño	0–0	Deportivo Abanca
		Report

27 May 2023	Deportivo	1–1	Cacereño
		Report

- 1–1 on aggregate; Deportivo progress as the higher-placed team in the regular season.
- Final

3 June 2023	Granada	2–0	Deportivo
		Report

10 June 2023	Deportivo	1–0	Granada
		Report

- Granada win 2–1 on aggregate.
