= 2021–22 Segunda División Pro (women) =

Segunda División Pro
- Season: 2021–22
- Teams: 34 teams
- Promoted: Levante Las Planas; Alhama
- Relegated: 18 teams to third tier (Note: Real Unión de Tenerife, Parquesol, Femarguín, Madrid CFF B, Santa Teresa, Zaragoza) (Note: Racing, Pradejón, Atlético Madrid B, Pozoalbense, La Solana, Betis B); 4 teams to 4th tier (Note: Sporting Gijón, Seagull, Elche, Castellón)

The 2021–22 Segunda División Pro, named Reto Iberdrola for sponsorship reasons, was the 21st season of the second highest league tier of women's football in Spain, and the third and last season under a new two-group format.

== Summary ==
After the unusual two-phase format adopted in the previous campaign due to the impact of the COVID-19 pandemic in Spain, the 2021–22 season began with its intended two-group setup as in 2019–20. However, it was decided that a single-division second tier of 16 teams (to be named Primera Federacion) would be introduced for the next season, with a third tier (Segunda Federacion) taking the two-group setup above the existing Primera Nacional of six groups, which would become the fourth tier. This meant there would be a great deal of movement from the Segunda Pro among its 32 participants at the end of the season:

- Two teams moving up to the top division as group winners (Note: Levante Las Planas, Alhama)
- Eight teams remaining at the second level based on their group position (Note: Espanyol, Osasuna, Dux Logroño, Barcelona B, Cacereño, Granada, Juan Grande, Granadilla B)
- Six more teams remaining at the second level by winning a play-off with their counterparts in the other group (Note: Deportivo La Coruña, Albacete, AEM, Athletic Bilbao B, Oviedo, Córdoba)
- The six losers of those playoff matches moving down to the third level
- Six teams moving down to the third level based on their group position
- Four teams being relegated to the fourth level

While Alhama won the South group by some distance, there was a dramatic conclusion in the North group, as Levante Las Planas (playing in the division below the year before) defeated fellow Catalan club Espanyol (six-time Spanish champions and in the division above the year before) 3–0 in a 'winner takes all' meeting on the final matchday to be promoted. Both groups ended with the team in 5th (remaining in 2nd tier) on the same points as the team in 6th (playoff) and ahead only by the margin of the results between them – although both of those teams who missed out by that narrow margin – Albacete and Deportivo La Coruña – won their playoff match.

== North Group ==
Promoted	Remain in second tier	Relegated to third tier	Relegated to fourth tier

=== Table ===
	Team	P	W	D	L	F	A	GD	Points
1	Levante Las Planas (P) (Note: Promotion to Primera División - tier 1)	30	19	5	6	64	37	27	62
2	Espanyol	30	17	7	6	50	34	16	58
3	Osasuna	30	17	6	7	56	33	23	57
4	Dux Logroño	30	15	8	7	48	33	15	53
5	Barcelona B	30	16	3	11	52	32	20	51
6	Deportivo La Coruña (PO) (Note: Won play-off with team in other group for place in Primera Federación - tier 2)	30	15	6	9	49	29	20	51
7	AEM (PO)	30	15	5	10	46	39	7	50
8	Oviedo (PO)	30	14	4	12	38	36	2	46
9	Zaragoza (PO) (Note: Lost play-off with team in other group, relegated to Segunda Federación - tier 3)	30	13	4	13	45	45	0	43
10	Athletic Bilbao B (PO)	30	11	6	13	44	41	3	39
11	Parquesol (PO)	30	11	5	14	41	51	-10	38
12	Racing (R) (Note: Relegation to Segunda Federación - tier 3)	30	10	8	12	37	43	-6	38
13	Pradejón (R)	30	8	6	16	32	53	-21	30
14	Atlético Madrid B (R)	30	9	3	18	34	60	-26	30
15	Sporting Gijón (R) (Note: Relegation to Primera Nacional - tier 4)	30	6	5	19	33	53	-20	23
16	Seagull (R)	30	2	3	25	23	73	-50	9

Source: Federación Española de Fútbol: Clasificación de la Segunda División Femenina de Fútbol – Grupo Norte

== South Group ==
Promoted	Remain in second tier	Relegated to third tier	Relegated to fourth tier

=== Table ===
	Team	P	W	D	L	F	A	GD	Points
1	Alhama (P) (Note: Promotion to Primera División - tier 1)	30	18	8	4	65	33	32	62
2	Cacereño	30	15	8	7	53	39	14	53
3	Granada	30	16	5	9	46	31	15	53
4	Juan Grande	30	14	9	7	41	32	9	51
5	Granadilla B	30	14	5	11	36	33	3	47
6	Albacete (PO) (Note: Won play-off with team in other group for place in Primera Federación - tier 2)	30	14	5	11	62	51	11	47
7	Madrid CFF B (PO) (Note: Lost play-off with team in other group, relegated to Segunda Federación - tier 3)	30	13	7	10	54	46	8	46
8	Córdoba (PO)	30	13	6	11	42	34	8	45
9	Santa Teresa (PO)	30	10	14	6	38	30	8	44
10	Femarguín (PO)	30	10	7	13	48	49	-1	37
11	Real Unión de Tenerife (PO)	30	8	12	10	35	41	-6	36
12	Pozoalbense (R) (Note: Relegation to Segunda Federación - tier 3)	30	8	9	13	40	57	-17	33
13	La Solana (R)	30	7	7	16	32	37	-5	28
14	Betis B (R)	30	8	4	18	33	55	-22	28
15	Elche (R) (Note: Relegation to Primera Nacional - tier 4)	30	7	7	16	37	54	-17	28
16	Castellón (R)	30	6	5	19	26	66	-40	23

Source: Federación Española de Fútbol: Clasificación de la Segunda División Femenina de Fútbol – Grupo Sur

== Play-offs ==
One-off ties were played on 31 May 2022, with the pairings allocated by the position in the respective groups: 6th played 11th, 7th played 10th and 8th played 9th.

Home team	Score	Away team
Deportivo La Coruña	3–1	Real Unión de Tenerife
Albacete	2–1	Parquesol
AEM	5–4	Femarguín
Madrid CFF B	1–2	Athletic Bilbao B
Oviedo	2–0	Santa Teresa
Córdoba	1–0	Zaragoza
