= Bárbara Santibáñez =

Chilean footballer (born 1996)

Personal information
- Full name: Bárbara Constanza Santibáñez Flores
- Date of birth: 23 August 1993 (age 33)
- Place of birth: Puente Alto, Santiago, Chile
- Height: 1.70 m (5 ft 7 in)
- Position: Forward

Team information
- Current team: Getafe (manager)

Youth career
- Colo-Colo

College career
Years	Team	Apps	(Gls)
2012–2016	USS		

Senior career*
Years	Team	Apps	(Gls)
2008–2012	Colo-Colo		
2012	Everton		
2013–2015	Santiago Morning		
2015–2016	Palestino		
2017	Universidad de Chile		
2017–2018	Sporting Huelva	14	(1)
2019	Zaragoza CFF		
2019–2020	Granada	19	(5)
2020–2021	CFF Cáceres	2	(1)
2021–2025	Cacereño	44	(3)
2025	Getafe	5	(0)

International career^{‡}
2010	Chile U17	2	(0)
2015	Chile (futsal)		
2018–	Chile	7	(0)

Managerial career
- 2022–2023: Cacereño Atlético (assistant)
- 2023–2025: Cacereño Atlético
- 2025–: Getafe
- * Club domestic league appearances and goals as of 20 October 2025 ‡ National team caps and goals as of 18 January 2019

Bárbara Constanza Santibáñez Flores (born 3 March 1996) is a Chilean football manager and footballer who plays as a forward. She is currently in charge of Spanish Segunda División Pro club Getafe.

== Club career ==
=== Sporting Huelva ===
In June 2017, Santibáñez joined Spanish club Sporting Huelva. In January 2019, she was released by the club, having made limited appearances.

=== Cacereño ===
In 2020, Santibáñez signed with CP Cacereño. In August 2023, she renewed her contract for a year. She left them at the end of the 2024–25 season.

=== Getafe ===
In August 2025, Santibáñez signed with Getafe.

== International career ==
Santibáñez represented Chile at the 2010 FIFA U-17 Women's World Cup.

Santibáñez also represented the Chile national futsal team in the 2015 Copa América de Futsal Femenina.

== Coaching career ==
At the same time she has been a player of CP Cacereño, she has coached Cacereño Atlético as assistant and head coach since the 2022–23 season.

On 30 October 2025, Santibáñez was appointed as manager of Getafe, leaving her role as player.

== Personal life ==
Born in Puente Alto, Santiago de Chile, as a primary student, she attended the República del Uruguay school in Valparaíso. As a high school student, she attended the Liceo Luis Miguel Amunátegui in Santiago.

Santibáñez graduated as a PE teacher at the San Sebastián University and played for the university team for five years.

== Honours ==
Colo-Colo

- Chilean women's football championship (4): 2010, 2011 Apertura, 2011 Clausura, 2012 Apertura

Palestino

- Chilean women's football championship (1), 2015 Clausura
