= 2024–25 Primera Federación (women) =

Primera Federación
- Season: 2024–25
- Teams: 14 teams
- Champions: Alhama
- Promoted: Alhama; DUX Logroño
- Relegated: Sporting de Huelva; Getafe; Atlético Baleares

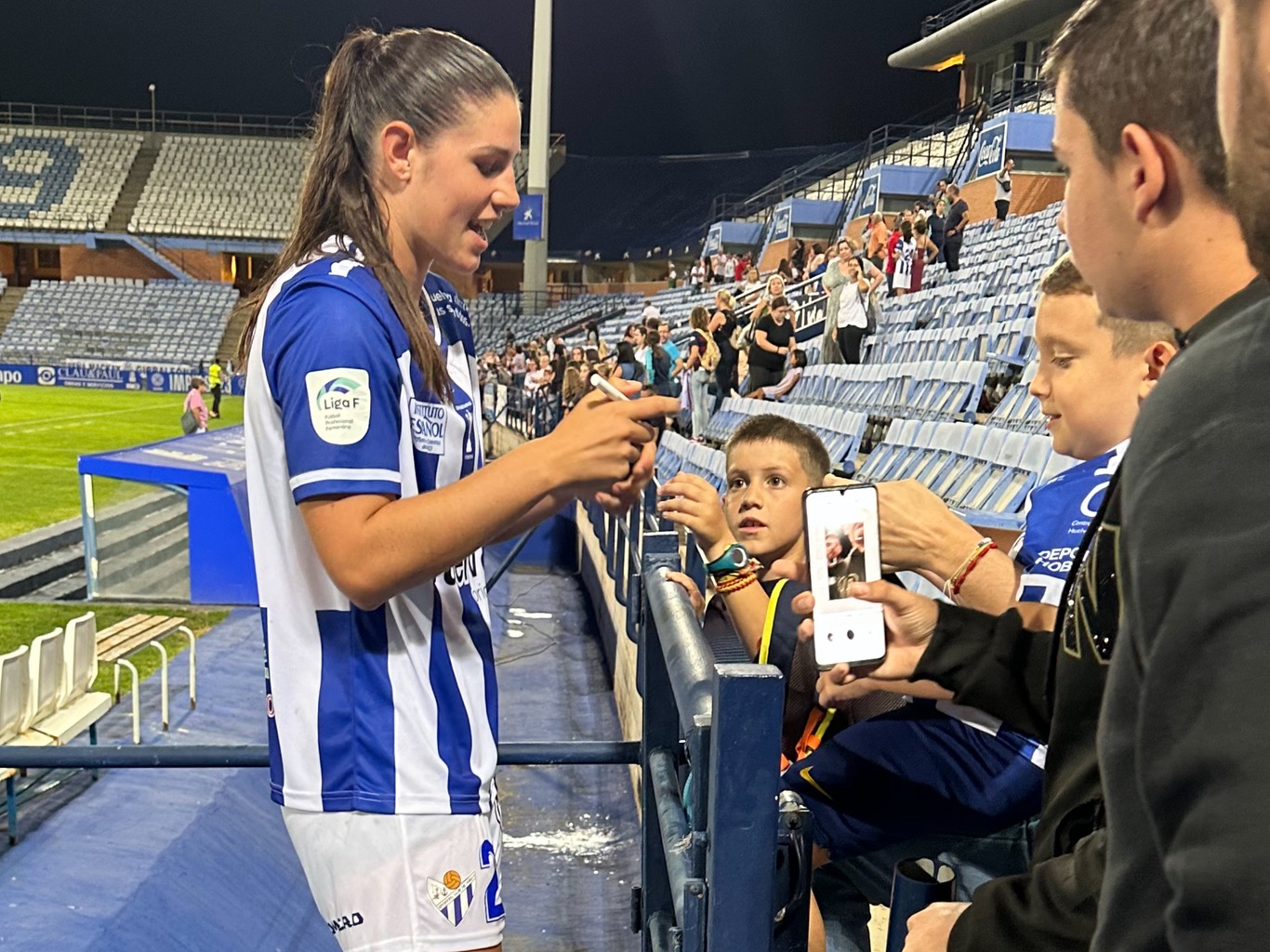
Jessica De Filippo signing autographs for fans after a match

The 2024–25 Primera Federación FutFem was the 24th season of the second highest league tier of women's football in Spain, and the third under that name and using a single group format.

== Summary ==
14 teams took part in the league: 9 from the previous season, 2 relegated from the previous Liga F campaign, and 3 promoted from the Segunda Federación. The winner (or the highest eligible club in the event of a reserve team winning) was to be promoted automatically to Liga F Moeve, with the next four eligible clubs entering a post-season play-off phase for a second spot. Three teams were to be relegated to the Segunda Federación league.

Alhama won the division and is promoted to Liga F Moeve. The 2nd to 5th placed teams took part in the promotion play-offs, won by DUX Logroño. Two of the newly promoted teams – Atlético Baleares and Getafe – were relegated back to Segunda Federación, along with one who had just dropped down from 2023-24 Liga F, Sporting de Huelva.

== Teams ==
Continuing

- AEM
- Alavés
- Alhama
- Atlético Madrid B
- Barcelona B
- Cacereño
- DUX Logroño
- Fundación Albacete
- Osasuna

Relegated from Liga F

- Sporting de Huelva
- Villarreal

Promoted from Segunda Federación

- Getafe
- Real Madrid B
- Atlético Baleares (Note: Promoted after playoffs win against Costa Adeje Tenerife B)

== Table ==
| Promoted | Promotion play-offs | Relegated |

| | Team | P | W | D | L | GF | GA | GD | Pts |
|---|---|---|---|---|---|---|---|---|---|
| 1 | Alhama | 26 | 16 | 8 | 2 | 44 | 14 | +30 | 56 |
| 2 | Alavés | 26 | 17 | 5 | 4 | 38 | 18 | +20 | 56 |
| 3 | AEM | 26 | 13 | 6 | 7 | 31 | 23 | +8 | 45 |
| 4 | DUX Logroño | 26 | 12 | 8 | 6 | 48 | 29 | +19 | 44 |
| 5 | Cacereño | 26 | 11 | 8 | 7 | 25 | 21 | +4 | 41 |
| 6 | Osasuna | 26 | 10 | 9 | 7 | 36 | 25 | +11 | 39 |
| 7 | Real Madrid B (Note: Reserve team, ineligible for promotion) | 26 | 11 | 5 | 10 | 38 | 27 | +11 | 38 |
| 8 | Barcelona B | 26 | 10 | 8 | 8 | 42 | 35 | +7 | 38 |
| 9 | Fundación Albacete | 26 | 8 | 9 | 9 | 24 | 29 | -5 | 33 |
| 10 | Villarreal | 26 | 8 | 6 | 12 | 29 | 36 | -7 | 30 |
| 11 | Atlético Madrid B | 26 | 7 | 9 | 10 | 26 | 35 | -9 | 30 |
| 12 | Atlético Baleares | 26 | 8 | 4 | 14 | 32 | 49 | -17 | 28 |
| 13 | Getafe | 26 | 3 | 4 | 19 | 19 | 51 | -32 | 13 |
| 14 | Sporting de Huelva | 26 | 1 | 5 | 20 | 13 | 53 | -40 | 8 |

Source: RFEF

== Results grid ==
| Home \ Away | AEM | ALA | ALB | ALH | ATM | BAL | BAR | CAC | GET | LOG | OSA | RMA | SPH | VIL |
|---|---|---|---|---|---|---|---|---|---|---|---|---|---|---|
| AEM | — | 1–0 | 2–2 | 0–2 | 2–0 | 3–1 | 2–1 | 1–0 | 1–0 | 3–1 | 0–0 | 2–1 | 2–0 | 1–0 |
| Alavés | 0–0 | — | 0–0 | 1–2 | 3–0 | 3–0 | 3–0 | 3–1 | 2–1 | 2–1 | 1–1 | 1–0 | 2–0 | 1–0 |
| Fundación Albacete | 1–0 | 0–1 | — | 2–1 | 1–0 | 1–1 | 2–3 | 1–1 | 0–1 | 0–4 | 0–3 | 1–0 | 1–0 | 2–3 |
| Alhama | 1–1 | 0–0 | 1–0 | — | 1–0 | 5–0 | 4–1 | 4–0 | 1–0 | 1–1 | 2–0 | 3–0 | 1–0 | 1–1 |
| Atlético Madrid B | 1–1 | 0–1 | 0–1 | 0–0 | — | 4–3 | 0–2 | 1–1 | 1–0 | 4–3 | 1–1 | 2–1 | 1–1 | 1–2 |
| Atlético Baleares | 1–0 | 1–2 | 1–3 | 1–2 | 2–2 | — | 1–2 | 0–1 | 3–0 | 1–5 | 0–2 | 1–0 | 2–1 | 1–0 |
| Barcelona B | 1–3 | 1–2 | 0–0 | 2–2 | 0–0 | 2–0 | — | 3–1 | 1–1 | 1–1 | 2–1 | 1–1 | 5–0 | 2–2 |
| Cacereño | 0–0 | 3–1 | 0–0 | 0–0 | 2–0 | 2–0 | 1–0 | — | 4–0 | 1–0 | 1–0 | 2–1 | 1–1 | 0–0 |
| Getafe | 2–3 | 1–2 | 2–2 | 0–2 | 1–2 | 1–1 | 1–6 | 0–2 | — | 1–4 | 1–1 | 1–2 | 2–1 | 0–1 |
| DUX Logroño | 3–1 | 0–2 | 2–1 | 2–0 | 0–0 | 4–1 | 0–0 | 1–0 | 2–0 | — | 0–0 | 1–1 | 4–0 | 2–2 |
| Osasuna | 1–0 | 1–1 | 2–0 | 0–1 | 1–1 | 1–1 | 2–3 | 0–1 | 4–2 | 2–2 | — | 3–1 | 1–0 | 2–0 |
| Real Madrid B | 3–0 | 3–1 | 0–0 | 2–2 | 3–0 | 1–2 | 3–1 | 3–0 | 0–1 | 3–0 | 2–1 | — | 3–0 | 3–1 |
| Sporting de Huelva | 0–2 | 0–1 | 1–3 | 0–3 | 1–3 | 1–4 | 0–2 | 0–0 | 1–0 | 0–2 | 1–3 | 0–0 | — | 2–3 |
| Villarreal | 1–0 | 1–2 | 0–0 | 0–2 | 1–2 | 1–3 | 2–0 | 1–0 | 3–0 | 2–3 | 1–3 | 0–1 | 2–2 | — |

Source: RFEF
Legend: Blue = home team win; Yellow = draw; Red = away team win.

== Promotion play-offs ==
- Semi-finals

| 4 May 2025 | DUX Logroño | 3–1 | AEM | Logroño |
| 18:00 CET (UTC+2) | Natalia Cebolla 28', 90+4'; Ximena Velazco 46' | Report | Verónica Herrera 18' | Stadium: Pradoviejo; Referee: Alejandra Raza Fernandez |

| 11 May 2025 | AEM | 1–0 | DUX Logroño | Lleida |
| 12:30 CET (UTC+2) | María Lara Molina 57' | Report | | Stadium: Recasens; Referee: Melissa López Osorio |

- DUX Logroño win 3–2 on aggregate.

| 4 May 2025 | Cacereño | 2–2 | Alavés | Cáceres |
| 18:00 CET (UTC+2) | Sara Rubio 60'; Adela Rico 82' | Report | Manoly Baquerizo 13'; Teresa Morató 69' (pen.) | Stadium: Campos Federativos Manuel Sánchez Delgado; Referee: Florencia Andrea Muñoz di Giovambattista |

| 11 May 2025 | Alavés | 1–2 | Cacereño | Vitoria-Gasteiz |
| 12:30 CET (UTC+2) | Inés Juan 67' (pen.) | Report | Gaste 85' (o.g.); Nerea Bengoa 120+3' (o.g.) | Stadium: Ciudad Deportiva José Luis Compañón; Referee: Patricia Luna Varo |

- Cacereño win 4–3 on aggregate.
- Final

| 18 May 2025 | Cacereño | 0–3 | DUX Logroño | Cáceres |
| 18:00 CET (UTC+2) | | Report | Sonya Keefe 35'; Natalia Cebolla 82'; Yui Fukuta 88' | Stadium: Campos Federativos Manuel Sánchez Delgado; Referee: Arantza Gallastegui |

| 25 May 2025 | DUX Logroño | 3–1 | Cacereño | Logroño |
| 18:00 CET (UTC+2) | Mía Asenjo 20'; Sonya Keefe 39', 56' | Report | Nora De Torres Hernández 83' | Stadium: Pradoviejo; Referee: Raquel Suárez González |

- DUX Logroño win 6–1 on aggregate and is promoted to Liga F.
