= Campus of Justice (Madrid) =

Urban development project in Madrid, Spain

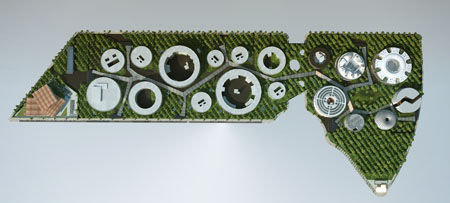
A model plan of the development by one of the architectural firms involved.

The Campus of Justice is an ongoing urban development project in Madrid, Spain, part of the broader Valdebebas development area in the eastern part of the city, adjacent to Madrid-Barajas International Airport. The goal of the project is to group together many local and regional courts in Madrid in one location, with all buildings using a circular architectural motif.

In 2014, the €500 million project was cancelled in the wake of the Great Recession, with only one building erected.

In December 2020, the first building on the campus was opened for public use, as the Institute of Legal Medicine and Forensic Sciences, containing facilities for autopsies and biosafety level 3 laboratories.
