= Andrea de la Nava =

Spanish footballer (born 1994)

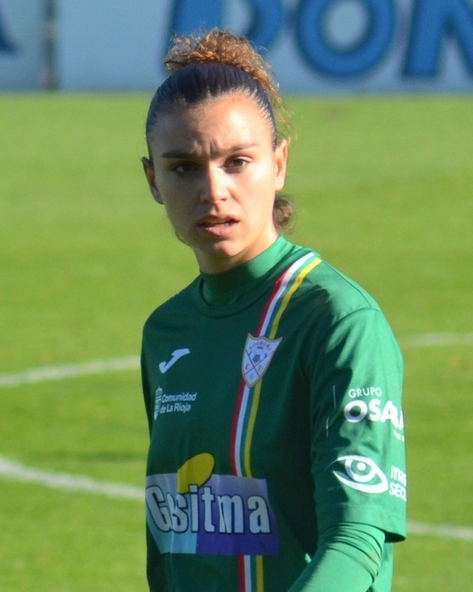

Personal information
- Full name: Andrea de la Nava Manzano
- Date of birth: 11 February 1994 (age 32)
- Place of birth: Barakaldo, Spain
- Position: Goalkeeper

Team information
- Current team: Logroño
- Number: 1

Youth career
- 2007–2009: Pauldarrak

Senior career*
Years	Team	Apps	(Gls)
2009–2015	Pauldarrak		
2015–2019	Logroño	30+	(0)
2019–2022	Athletic Club	44	(0)
2022–	Logroño	21	(0)
- * Club domestic league appearances and goals as of 1 July 2023

Andrea de la Nava Manzano (born 11 February 1994) is a Spanish footballer who plays as a goalkeeper for Logroño. She previously played for Athletic Club.

== Club career ==
De la Nava started her career at Pauldarrak.
