= Lisa-Marie Scholz =

German footballer (born 1988)

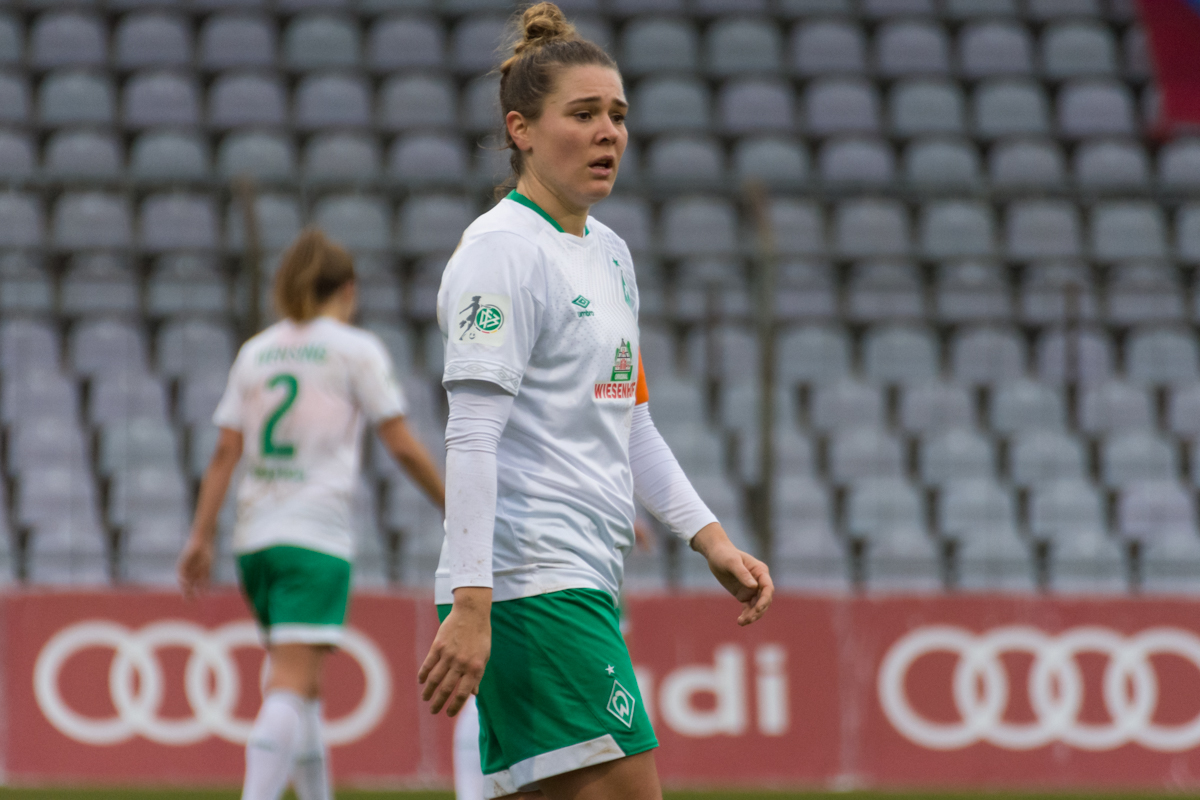
- Scholz with Werder Bremen

Personal information
- Date of birth: 19 November 1988 (age 37)
- Place of birth: Osnabrück, Germany
- Height: 1.73 m (5 ft 8 in)
- Position: Midfielder

Senior career*
Years	Team	Apps	(Gls)
2004–2007	FFC Heike Rheine		
2008–2009	FC Gütersloh 2000		
2009–2020	Werder Bremen		
2020–2021	Córdoba CF		
2021–2022	SE AEM		
- * Club domestic league appearances and goals

Lisa-Marie Scholz (born 19 November 1988) is a German former footballer who played as a midfielder for Werder Bremen and for Spanish clubs Córdoba CF and SE AEM.
