= Sonya Keefe =

Chilean football and futsal player

Personal information
- Full name: Sonya Camila Keefe Navarro
- Date of birth: 11 April 2003 (age 23)
- Place of birth: Santiago, Chile
- Height: 1.68 m (5 ft 6 in)
- Position: Forward

Team information
- Current team: Real Sociedad
- Number: 9

Youth career
- 2016: Maipú (city team)
- 2017: Pudahuel (city team)
- 2018: Independencia (city team)

Senior career*
Years	Team	Apps	(Gls)
- Boston College
2019–2020	Unión Española		
2021–2022	Universidad de Chile		
2023–2024	Cacereño	40	(10)
2024–2025	DUX Logroño	30	(16)
2025–2026	Granada	28	(11)
2026–	Real Sociedad	0	(0)

International career
2018	Chile U20		
2018	Chile U20 (futsal)		
2019	Chile U17		
2020–	Chile	1	(1)
- * Club domestic league appearances and goals as of 10 July 2026

Sonya Camila Keefe Navarro (born 11 April 2003) is a Chilean football and futsal player who plays as a forward for Spanish Liga F club Real Sociedad.

== Club career ==
She represented the teams of the communes Maipú, Pudahuel and Independencia in the Copa Enel between 2016 and 2018, winning the 2018 edition.

Keefe started her career in Boston College. She played for Unión Española in 2019. However, the Primera B league was suspended due to the COVID-19 pandemic. In 2021, Keefe joined Universidad de Chile. In her debut against Deportes Antofagasta, Keefe scored two goals.

In 2023, Keefe moved to Spain and joined CP Cacereño in the second division. She left them in July 2024 and switched to DUX Logroño.

After getting promotion to the Liga F with DUX Logroño, Keefe signed with Granada on 10 July 2025 for a season.

On 10 July 2026, it was announced that Keefe had signed with Real Sociedad on a two-year contract.

== International career ==
=== Youth teams ===
Keefe played in Chile's Under-17 national team, and scored a goal against Thailand in a tournament.

At under-20 level, she was part of the Chile squad at the 2018 South American Games. In 2018, Keefe also represented Chile's Under-20 futsal team in the 2018 Summer Youth Olympics.

=== Senior teams ===
Keefe was first called to the Chile women's national team in 2020 for the friendly games against Zambia, but she did not play. In September 2021, she was called to the national team and played in a training match against Uruguay.

Keefe made her senior debut against Mexico in a friendly on 10 October 2022.

==== International goals ====
Scores and results list the Chile's goal tally first.

#	Date	Venue	Opponent	Score	Result	Competition
1.	12 November 2022	Estadio Sausalito, Viña del Mar, Chile	Philippines	1–1	1–1	Friendly
2.	3 July 2025	Estadio Bicentenario de La Florida, La Florida, Chile	Bolivia	2–0	5–0	Friendly
3.	3 July 2025	Estadio Bicentenario de La Florida, La Florida, Chile	Bolivia	3–0	5–0	Friendly
4.	12 July 2025	Estadio Banco Guayaquil, Quito, Ecuador	Peru	2–0	3–0	2025 Copa América Femenina
5.	21 July 2025	Estadio Banco Guayaquil, Quito, Ecuador	Ecuador	1–1	2–1	2025 Copa América Femenina
6.	28 October 2025	Estadio El Teniente, Rancagua, Chile	Bolivia	1–0	5–0	2025–26 CONMEBOL Liga de Naciones Femenina
7.	28 October 2025	Estadio El Teniente, Rancagua, Chile	Bolivia	2–0	5–0	2025–26 CONMEBOL Liga de Naciones Femenina

== Personal life ==
Her father is English and her mother is Chilean.

== Honours ==
Independencia (city team)

- Copa Enel: 2018

Universidad de Chile

- Primera División (1): 2021

Individual

- Premios Contragolpe - Revelation Player: 2021
