= CD Atlético Baleares (women) =

Spanish football club

Coordinates: 39.569511°N 2.680102°E

Atlético Baleares
- Full name: Club Deportivo Atlético Baleares, SAD
- Nicknames: ATB, Balears, baleariques, blanc-i-blaves
- Founded: 1984–85; 2018
- Ground: Son Malferit, Palma, Balearic Islands, Spain
- Capacity: 1,200
- Chairman: Ingo Volckmann
- Manager: Txema Expósito
- League: Primera Federación
- 2023–24: Segunda Federación, 2nd
- Website: https://atleticobaleares.com/en/plantilla-femenina/
Home colours	Away colours

Club Deportivo Atlético Baleares, officially called Balears Futbol Club, is the women's football section of CD Atlético Baleares. The club is located in Palma (Mallorca, Balearic Islands) and competes in the Primera Federación, the second level of Spanish women's soccer. Atlético Baleares plays its matches at Son Malferit.

== History ==
The current team had a precedent in the 1980s, when CIDE, a neighbourhood team from Palma, became part of Atlético Baleares for the 1984–85 season. The team ended the season as champion of the Regional League of Mallorca and played the quarterfinals of Copa de la Reina, but would not continue and moved to another club when the season ended.

The current section was presented on 6 August 2018 and consisted of an amateur team of 18 players. The first season, 2018–19, Atlético Baleares was promoted to the Primera Nacional. In 2021–22, the team ended second and was promoted to the Segunda Federación, a newly created third category.

After promotion to the Segunda Federación, the club aimed to stay up during the 2022–23 season, but the results were above expectations, and the team finished third, on the verge of a second promotion. In 2023–24, Atlético Baleares came second and competed in the play-off for promotion to the Primera Federación against UD Granadilla Tenerife B (2–1 in Palma and 2–2 in Adeje), and achieved promotion to the Primera Federación. In short, Atlético Baleares achieved three promotions in six years of life, reaching the second category of Spanish women's football.

== Stadium ==
Atlético Baleares holds its home games at Camp de Son Malferit, with a 1,200-spectators capacity.

== Season to season ==
Season	Tier	Division	Place
1984/85	3	Regional	1st
1985–2018: No participation
2018/19	3	Autonómica	1st (Note: Due to the creation of the new Primera División B, the team promoted but remained in the same level.)
2019/20	3	Nacional	7th
2020/21	3	Nacional	3rd
2021/22	3	Nacional	2nd (Note: Due to the creation of the new Segunda Federación, the team promoted but remained in the same level.)
2022/23	3	2ª Federación	3rd
2023/24	3	2ª Federación	2nd
2024/25	2	1ª Federación	--

== Titles ==
- Regional (T3)
  - Winners 1984–85, 2017–18: 2
- Tercera Federación
  - Runners-up 2021–22: 1
- Segunda Federación
  - Runners-up 2023–24: 1

== Current squad ==
Note: Flags indicate national team as defined under FIFA eligibility rules; some limited exceptions apply. Players may hold more than one non-FIFA nationality.

No.	Pos.	Nation	Player
1	GK	ESP	Sandra Torres (2nd captain)
2	DF	ESP	Andrea Alcaide (5th captain)
4	DF	ESP	Paula Rojas
5	DF	ESP	Marina Orozco
6	MF	ESP	Andrea Ríos (3rd captain)
7	MF	ESP	Gabi Gutiérrez (4th captain)
9	FW	ESP	Mabel Okoye
10	FW	ESP	Núria Pomer
11	MF	ESP	Marina Orozco (1st captain)
12	FW	ESP	Rocío García

No.	Pos.	Nation	Player
13	GK	ESP	Blanca Noguera
14	MF	ESP	Cora Coll
15	DF	ESP	Fátima Traversaro
16	DF	ESP	Núria Ferrer
17	FW	ESP	Mar Rubio
18	DF	ESP	Carla Sánchez
19	FW	ESP	Karla Bermejo
20	DF	ESP	Berta Doltra
21	DF	ESP	Nerea Orfila

== Margarita Miranda Trophy ==
The Margarita Miranda Trophy is the annual pre-season tournament hosted by Atlético Baleares that serves as a presentation of the first women's team. Existing since 2022, each year a new team is invited to play the match at the Estadi Balear. The name of the tournament is dedicated to Margalida Miranda Bordoy, a sporting director at Atlético Baleares during the 1960s and 1970s and one of the first women with a high function in the world of Balearic football.
