= Justina Morcillo =

Argentine footballer

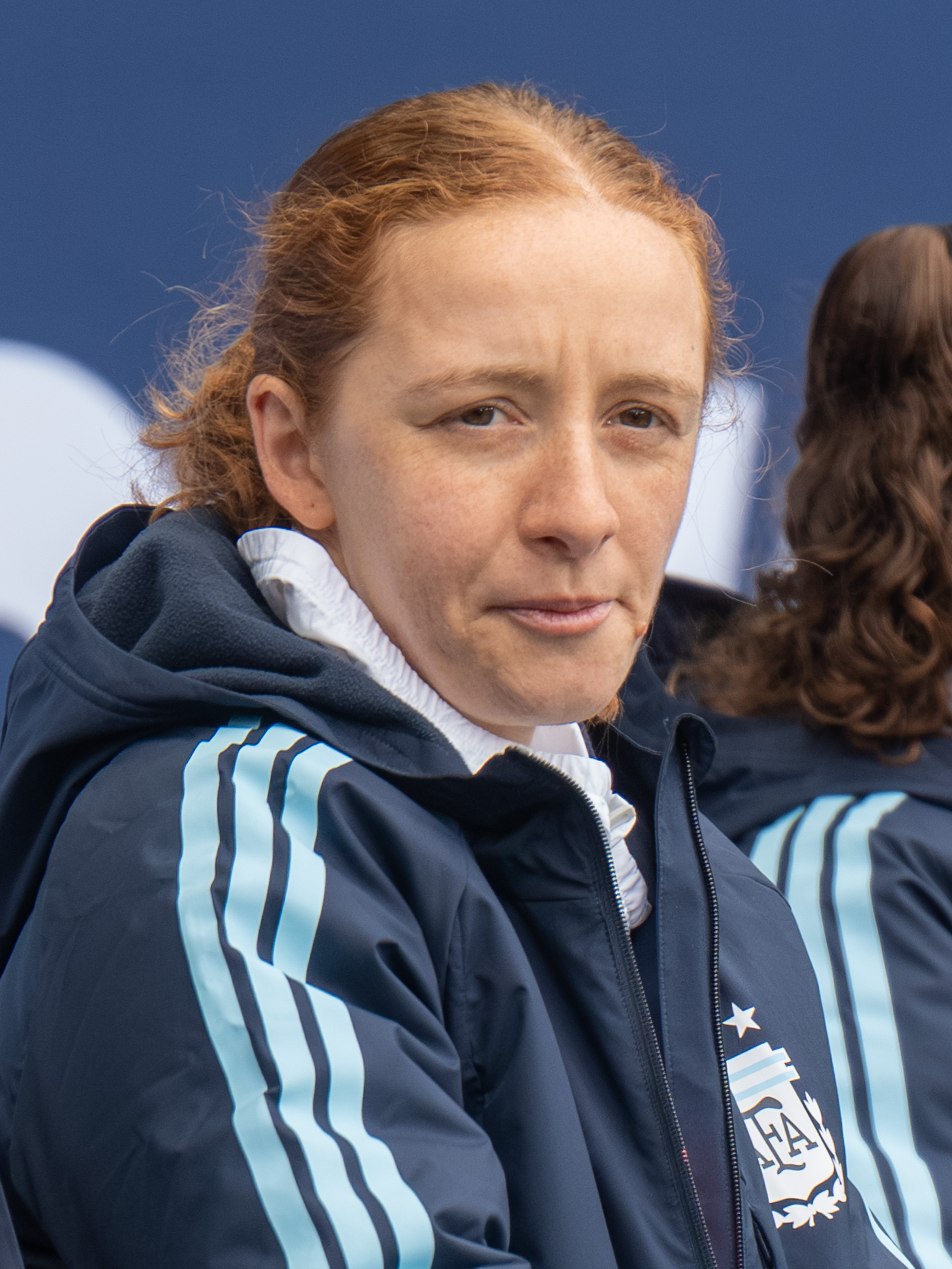
- Morcillo with Argentina in 2026

Personal information
- Date of birth: 9 August 2000 (age 26)
- Place of birth: La Plata, Argentina
- Height: 1.61 m (5 ft 3 in)
- Position: Centre-back

Team information
- Current team: Dux Logroño
- Number: 22

Youth career
- 2011–2014: River Plate

Senior career*
Years	Team	Apps	(Gls)
2014–2023	River Plate		
2023–2024	Atlético San Luis	22	(0)
2024–	Dux Logroño		

International career^{‡}
- Argentina U20
2019–	Argentina	7	(0)
- * Club domestic league appearances and goals ‡ National team caps and goals as of 18 April 2026

Justina Morcillo (born 9 August 2000) is an Argentine footballer who plays as a midfielder for Liga F club Dux Logroño and the Argentina women's national team.

== Club career ==
=== River Plate ===
Justina arrived at River Plate at the age of 11. In 2015, she made her debut with the club's first team and scored 2 goals in a 24–0 victory against Almagro. Justina continue her grow at the club and in 2022 was named team captain. On 25 June 2023 she played her last game with River Plate a 2–1 victory against Estudiantes (LP).

=== Atlético San Luis ===
On 11 July 2023, Justina signed with the Mexican Liga MX Femenil club Atlético San Luis.

== International career ==
Morcillo made her senior debut for Argentina on 7 November 2019, in a 2–1 away friendly won against Paraguay.

== Career statistics ==
=== International ===
As of match played 14 April 2026

Appearances and goals by national team and year
National team	Year	Apps	Goals
Argentina	2019	2	0
Argentina	2025	1	0
Argentina	2026	4	0
Total		7	0

== Personal life ==
Justina has a sister Carolina Morcillo, who is also a footballer.

== Honours ==
River Plate

- Primera División A: 2016–17
- Copa Federal: 2022
