= San Sebastián University =

St. Sebastian University
- Universidad San Sebastián
- Motto: Illuminate the Future
- Type: Private
- Established: 1989
- President: Carlos Vio
- Students: 52974
- Undergraduates: 47555
- Postgraduates: 3397
- Location: Bellavista 7, Recoleta, Santiago de Chile Concepción (Ex-casa central), Valdivia y Puerto Montt, Chile
- Campus: Urban
- Language: Spanish
- Mascots: Seba, The Puma
- Website: www.uss.cl

Universidad San Sebastián (USS, St. Sebastian University) is a Chilean private autonomous university founded in 1989 in Concepción and accredited at the Advanced level. Its headquarters situated in Santiago de Chile. It is also located in Concepción (its previous headquarters), Valdivia and Puerto Montt. As of 2025, these facilities serve over 52,000 students. In 2001, USS gets a formal state recognition as autonomous university. Since 2017, has participated in Chile's Unified Admission System (Sistema de Acceso a la Educación Superior).

== Overview ==
San Sebastián University forms part of the private higher education sector that developed in Chile following regulatory reforms enacted in the late twentieth century. The institution was established under the legal framework that authorized the creation of private universities (DFL No. 1).

Since achieving institutional autonomy in 2001, the university has adopted a multi-campus structure and expanded its academics offerings. Its activities include undergraduate and postgraduate education, research, and community engagement.

=== History ===
==== Foundation and Early Development ====
San Sebastián University was founded in 1989 in Concepción. Academic activities began in 1990 with an initial cohort fewer than 200 students and degree programs Commercial Engineering and Psychology.

During the 1990s, the university expanded its academic offerings to include programs in law, education, journalism, social work, and health-related disciplines. This period also saw gradual enrollment growth and the establishment of additional teaching facilities in southern Chile.

==== Institutional Autonomy and National Expansion ====
In 2001, USS obtained full institutional autonomy, enabling it to independently grant academic degrees and broaden its institutional scope. Following this milestone, the university expanded beyond its regional origins, opening campuses in Santiago, Valdivia, and Puerto Montt, and consolidating its presence at the national level.

During the 2000s and 2010s, the university further diversified into areas such as medicine, dentistry, engineering, and veterinary medicine, while increasing its involvement in postgraduate education and research activities.

== Values ==
The USS stands by seven values instilled in its students, these are:

- Búsqueda de la verdad "The search of truth"
- Vocación por el trabajo bien hecho "Vocation for well-done work"
- Honestidad "Honesty"
- Responsabilidad "Responsibility"
- Solidaridad "Solidarity"
- Alegría "Happiness"
- Superación "Improvement"

== Careers ==
By 2009, Santiago counted with 32 careers, Concepción 39, Valdivia 16, Osorno 14 and Puerto Montt 17. Some of these are:

- Architecture
- Physical Education
- Differential Education
- Preschool Education
- History and Geography
- English
- Language and Communication
- Education in Mathematics
- Speech Therapy
- Kinesiology
- Nutrition and Dietetics
- Medical Technology
- Occupational Therapy
- Political Science and Public Management
- Social Work
- Law
- Nursing
- Medicine
- Veterinarian Medicine
- Bachelor of Health Sciences
- Biochemistry
- Chemistry and Pharmacy
- Obstetrics
- Dentistry
- Psychology
