= Aixa Salvador =

Spanish footballer (born 2001)

Personal information
- Full name: Aixa Salvador García
- Date of birth: 12 October 2001 (age 25)
- Place of birth: Castellón de la Plana, Spain
- Height: 1.61 m (5 ft 3 in)
- Position: Forward

Team information
- Current team: Villarreal
- Number: 3

Senior career*
Years	Team	Apps	(Gls)
2015–2016	Villarreal B		
2016–2020	Villarreal	21+	(10+)
2020–2021	Real Betis	30	(2)
2021–2022	Villarreal	4	(0)
2022–2023	Dux Logroño		
2023–2024	Levante	5	(0)
2024–	Villarreal		

International career
2018	Spain U17		
2019	Spain U19		
- * Club domestic league appearances and goals as of 15:20, 13 December 2021 (UTC)

Aixa Salvador García (born 12 October 2001) is a Spanish footballer who plays as a forward for Villarreal.

== Club career ==
Salvador started her career at Villarreal B. She was only 13 when she started playing for Villarreal B and was promoted to the senior Villarreal team at the age of 14.
