= Real Madrid Femenino B =

- Full name: Real Madrid Club de Fútbol Femenino B
- Nickname: Las Blancas (The Whites)
- Founded: 1 July 2020; 6 years ago
- Ground: Ciudad Real Madrid; Madrid, Spain
- Capacity: 1,000
- Chairman: Florentino Pérez
- Manager: David Fernández
- League: Primera Federación
- 2025–26: Primera Federación, 4th
- Website: realmadrid.com
Home colours	Away colours

Real Madrid Femenino B is a Spanish football club based in Madrid. Formed in 2020, is the reserve team of Real Madrid Femenino, and currently plays in Primera Federación, playing their home matches at the Ciudad Real Madrid.

Reserve teams in Spain play in the same league system as the senior team, rather than in a reserve team league. They must play at least one level below their main side, and thus Real Madrid Femenino B are ineligible for promotion to Primera División and cannot play in the Copa de la Reina.

== Players ==
=== Current squad ===
As of 27 September 2026.

Note: Flags indicate national team as defined under FIFA eligibility rules; some limited exceptions apply. Players may hold more than one non-FIFA nationality.

No.	Pos.	Nation	Player
1	GK	ESP	Andrea Téllez
2	DF	ESP	Silvia Blasco
3	DF	ESP	Paula Rascón
4	DF	ESP	Claudia de la Cuerda
5	MF	ESP	Adriana Folgado
7	FW	ESP	Bibiana Casquero
8	MF	ESP	Oihane San Martín
9	FW	ESP	Erika del Pino
10	FW	ESP	Bea Vélez
11	MF	ESP	Pau Rubio
12	DF	ESP	Noelia Llamas
13	GK	POL	Hanna Wieczerzak

No.	Pos.	Nation	Player
14	DF	ESP	Aitana Closa
15	DF	ESP	Abril Díaz
16	MF	ESP	Adriana Valbuena
17	FW	ESP	Candela Rodríguez
18	DF	MAR	Yasmine Zouhir
19	DF	ESP	María Valle
20	FW	ARG	Dolores Delgado
21	FW	ESP	Alba Rodao
22	DF	ESP	Raquel Zuazo
23	FW	CMR	Achta Toko
24	MF	NED	Fleur Verkooijen
25	GK	ESP	Cristina Águeda

== Honours ==
- Segunda Federación: 1
  - 2023–24
- Primera Nacional: 1
  - 2021–22
- Preferente de Madrid: 1
  - 2020–21

== See also ==
- Category:Real Madrid Femenino B players
