= Ana de Teresa =

Spanish footballer (born 2001)

Personal information
- Full name: Ana Lucía de Teresa Romero
- Date of birth: 5 November 2001 (age 25)
- Place of birth: Ibiza, Spain
- Height: 1.66 m (5 ft 5 in)
- Position: Forward

Team information
- Current team: Deportivo
- Number: 9

Senior career*
Years	Team	Apps	(Gls)
2017–2018	Levante C		
2018–2020	Levante B	18+	(7+)
2019–2022	Levante	1	(0)
2020–2021	→ Rayo Vallecano (loan)	18	(5)
2021–2022	→ Eibar (loan)	16	(1)
2022–2023	Sporting de Huelva	20	(2)
2023–	Deportivo	–	(8)
- * Club domestic league appearances and goals as of 13:15, 17 April 2022 (UTC)

Ana Lucía de Teresa Romero (born 5 November 2001), often known as ADT, is a Spanish footballer who plays as a forward for Deportivo.

== Club career ==
De Teresa started her career at Levante C.
