= Primera Federación (women) =

- Founded: 2022
- Country: Spain
- Confederation: UEFA
- Number of clubs: 14
- Level on pyramid: 2
- Promotion to: Liga F
- Relegation to: Segunda Federación
- Current champions: Barcelona B (2025–26)
- Most championships: Barcelona B (3 titles)
- Website: rfef.es/primera-federacion-futfem
- Current: 2026–27

The Primera Federación, also called Reto Iberdrola for sponsorship reasons, is the second level of league competition for Spanish women's football since the 2022–23 season.

As a single nationwide league below the top level, it is the female equivalent of the men's Segunda División and is run by the Royal Spanish Football Federation.

== History ==
On 24 July 2018, the Royal Spanish Football Federation agreed to create a new second division between the Primera División, featuring 16 teams, and the Segunda División, in which 112 teams were involved.

In its first season, the league was to be contested by 32 teams divided into two groups: two teams relegated from the 2018–19 Primera División and the 30 best teams from the 2018–19 Segunda División.

In July 2019, the new second tier was renamed as Segunda División Pro being later re-branded as Reto Iberdrola for sponsorship reasons. The level below which had carried that name previously recovered its former name of Primera Nacional.

On 10 June 2020, the Segunda División was granted professionalized league status.

In early 2022, it was confirmed that the league structure would be altered again, after only three seasons: the existing Primera División would be a standalone professional league of 16 teams, the second tier would be a single nationwide 16-team division known as the Primera Federación, the existing Segunda División Pro with two regionalised groups (32 teams) would become the third tier and be named the Segunda Federación, and the existing Primera Nacional division of 96 teams (six regionalised 16-team groups) would become the fourth tier. These levels would be administered by the RFEF and more closely resemble the men's post-2021 structure, albeit only one professional league and six fourth-tier groups rather than five (the fourth level was re-named the Tercera Federación FUTFEM prior to the 2023–24 season).

== Teams ==
As of the 2025–26 season

From Primera Federación (9)	Relegated from Liga F (2)	Promoted from Segunda Federación (3)
AEM	Valencia	Europa
Alavés	Real Betis	Real Oviedo
Fundación Albacete		Tenerife B
Atlético Madrid B		
Barcelona B		
Cacereño		
Osasuna		
Real Madrid B		
Villarreal		

== Second tier champions and promotions (since 2019–20) ==
- For promotions to the top division up to 2019, see Primera Nacional de Fútbol (women)#Promoted teams

Season	North Group	South Group	Other promoted teams
2019–20	Athletic Club B (not promoted)	Santa Teresa	Eibar
2020–21	Alavés	Villarreal	N/A
2021–22	Levante Las Planas	Alhama	N/A

Season	Winners	Playoff winners	Other promoted teams
2022–23	Barcelona B (not promoted)	Granada	Eibar
2023–24	Barcelona B (not promoted)	Espanyol	Deportivo de La Coruña
2024–25	Alhama	DUX Logroño	N/A
2025–26	Barcelona B (not promoted)	Valencia	Alavés
