= Valdebebas =

District of Madrid, Spain

Coordinates: 40.49°N 3.63°W

Valdebebas (Spanish pronunciation: [baldeˈβeβas]) is an urban development area under construction in the city of Madrid, Spain near Barajas Airport. It will host around 12,500 apartments and houses for a population of 40,000 inhabitants. The Valdebebas Woodland Park is being constructed with an area of 500 hectares. The neighbourhood will also have retail spaces, offices, hotels, and public facilities.

== Location ==
Valdebebas is situated 8 kilometers from Plaza de Castilla and the Cuatro Torres complex in northeastern Madrid. The area is bordered to the north by La Moraleja, to the south by IFEMA, to the east by Barajas International Airport T-4 and to the west by Sanchinarro.

== Transportation ==
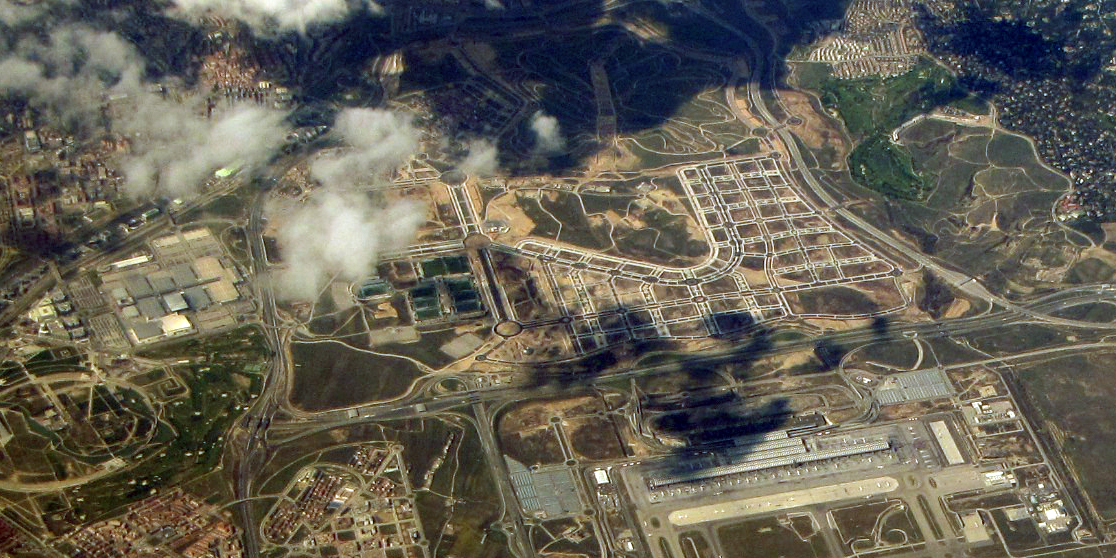

Four major routes surround the Valdebebas area:

- The M-11, connecting Barajas Airport to the city center.
- The M-40, one of the principal bypasses of Madrid.
- The Radial 2, that directs to the northeast region of Madrid.
- The M-12, the north–south airport axis.

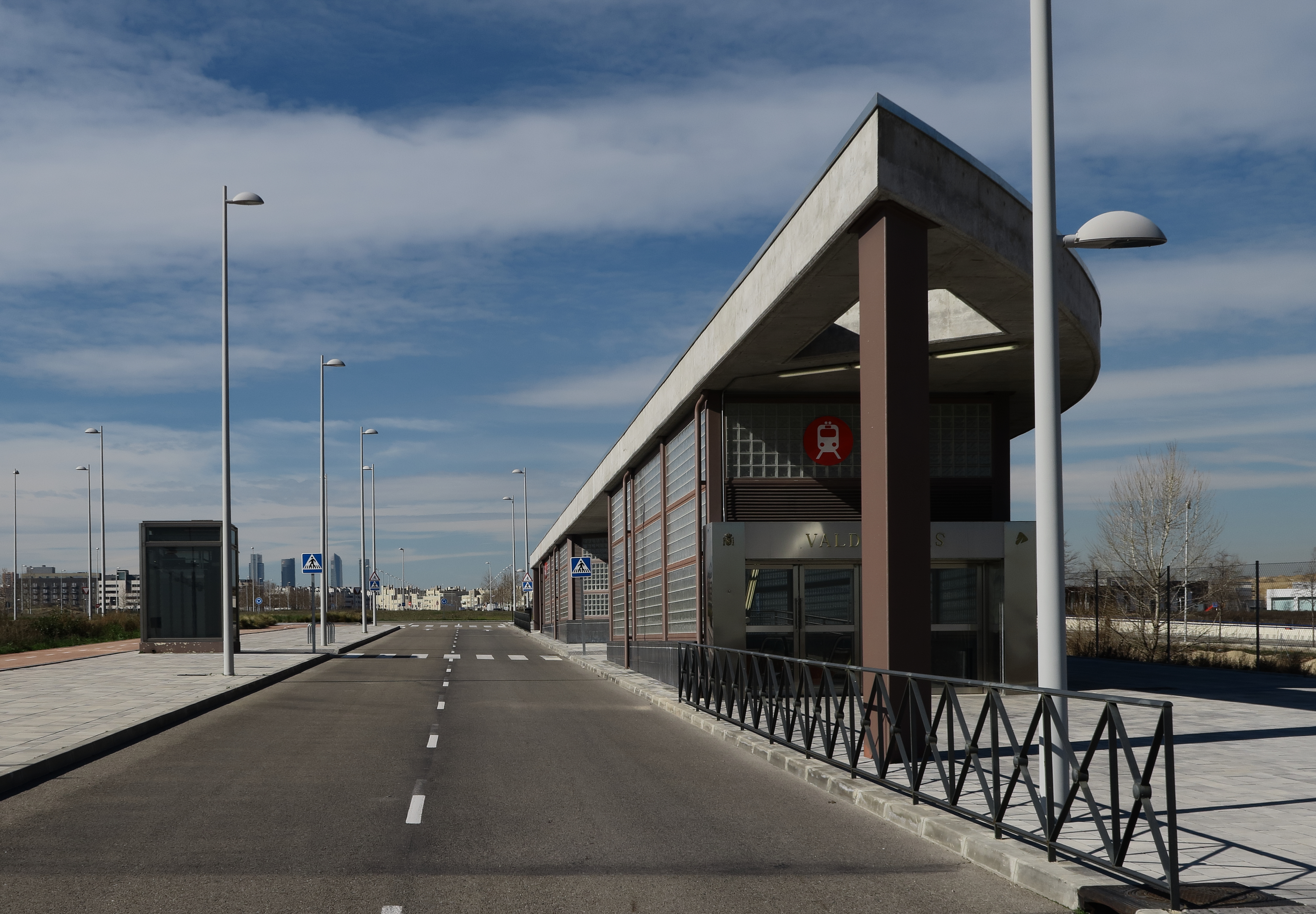
Valdebebas railway station

A station of the Cercanías commuter train line is under construction. The station forms part of a line extension that includes two more stops: Barajas T-4 and Fuente de la Mora, the latter already in use. Valdebebas train station was completed in 2011, but remains out of service as of February 2013. The tunnel, which has dual-gauge tracks, will also host high-speed train AVE train starting in Terminal 4, with no stop in Valdebebas. There is also a commitment by Madrid City Hall to open urban bus lines for the new neighbourhood. The station opened for service in December 2015.

== Real Madrid training facilities ==
Valdebebas is the home of Ciudad Real Madrid, the main training facilities of Real Madrid.
