= Ciudad Deportiva Villarreal CF =

Training ground of Villarreal CF

Ciudad Deportiva
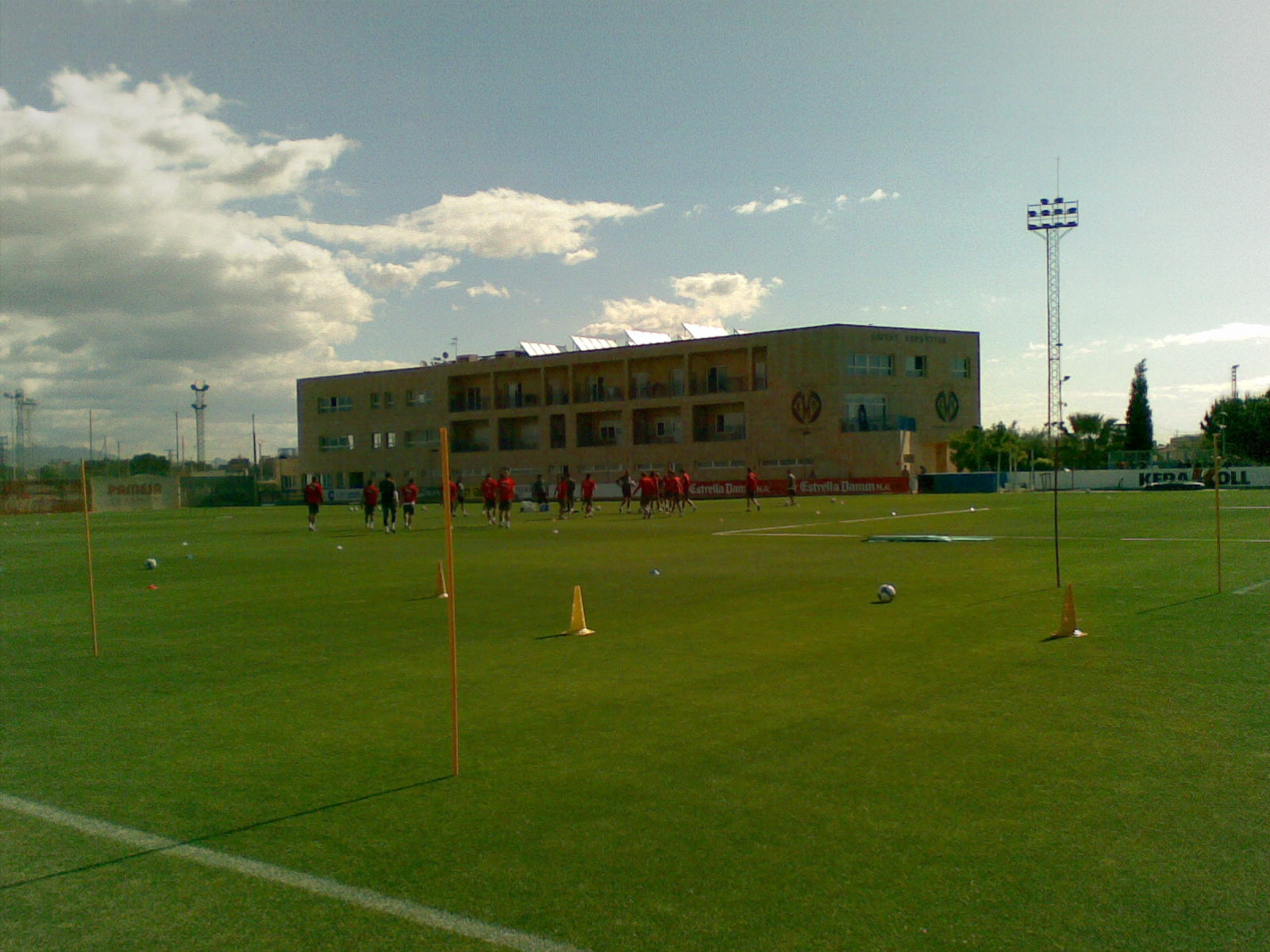
- Interactive map of Ciudad Deportiva
- Location: Villarreal
- Coordinates: 39.94046°N 0.11501°W
- Owner: Villarreal CF
- Type: Football training ground

Construction
- Opened: 2003

Tenant
- Villarreal CF (training) (2003–)

Website
- Villarreal CF sport city (archived 27 April 2015)

Ciudad Deportiva Villarreal CF, also known as Ciudad Deportiva Pamesa Cerámica for sponsorship reasons, is the training ground of Villarreal CF, and is located in Villarreal.

Occupying an area of 70,000 m², the training centre is located at the western suburbs of Villarreal.

== Facilities ==
- Mini Estadi, with a capacity of 3,637 seats, is the home stadium of Villarreal CF B, the reserve team of Villarreal CF.
- 2 grass pitches (100x65m)
- 2 artificial pitches (90x60m)
- 3 mini artificial pitches (60x35m)
- Service centre with gymnasium
