= Real Madrid City =

Football Training Facility Complex in Valdebebas, Spain

Ciudad Real Madrid
- Valdebebas
- Interactive map of Ciudad Real Madrid
- Location: Valdebebas, Madrid
- Coordinates: 40°28′45″N 03°36′42″W
- Owner: Real Madrid
- Type: Football training facility

Construction
- Opened: 2005
- Cost: €100 million

Tenants
- Real Madrid (training); Real Madrid Femenino; Real Madrid Castilla; Real Madrid C Real Madrid Youth

The Ciudad Real Madrid Florentino Pérez (Spanish : Florentino Pérez Real Madrid City) is Real Madrid's training complex, located outside Madrid in Valdebebas near Barajas airport. Also hosting the club's youth academy, known conceptually as La Fábrica, the facility replaced the old Ciudad Deportiva (Spanish: Sports City), which was in use until 2003.

The sale of Ciudad Deportiva, under the auspices of Real Madrid president Florentino Pérez, led to Real earning approximately €480 million. The complex has been nicknamed, and is known to the players, trainers and club staff as 'Valdebebas' (Bal-de-beh-bahs), and is named after the district of the city where the complex is located. Inaugurated in 2005, the training centre consists of academy offices, equipment rooms, audio-visuals rooms, a strength and rehab centre, and medical (which consist of examination rooms, treatment rooms, additional rehab facilities and equipment, and a hydrotherapy center that includes hot and cool pools, a cold plunge, and a long but narrow resistance wave pool) and training facilities, as well as 12 and one third fields - three full-size synthetic turf fields and four full-size natural grass field for the youth, and for the first team, one third full-size synthetic turf field and three full-size natural grass fields. Ciudad Real Madrid also includes the Alfredo Di Stéfano Stadium where Real Madrid Castilla (Real Madrid's reserve team) plays its home matches.

The Real Madrid first team residential building at Real Madrid Sports City is 8300 square meters in size, and has 57 rooms distributed across the first and second floors, each with their own lounge area and terrace. The building also has a cinema, a dining room capable of accommodating 54 people, a common rest area, a climate-controlled pool, reception, two guest rooms, and several common terraces.

The youth team residence is dedicated to accommodate life those players whose families do not reside in Madrid. It has 40 double rooms, each with a balcony and private bathroom, a common dining room, common rest areas, and classrooms for the academic education pertaining to the respective age groups that occurs in the afternoons. Players aged between 10 and 18 years reside in the youth team residential building.

In the middle of the 2015–16 season, the Real Madrid basketball division was also provided with their own sports facilities at Valdebebas. A new training pavilion was built with four simultaneously usable tracks, one for the first team and the rest for the field teams. Ciudad Real Madrid covers 1.2 million square meters in total, of which only 270,000 square meters of space has been developed as of 2017.
