= Logroño United =

Spanish football club

- Full name: Logroño United
- Nickname: La Vinotinto (The Red Wine)
- Founded: 2008; 18 years ago as Club Deportivo Escuelas de Fútbol de Logroño
- Stadium: Estadio Las Gaunas
- Capacity: 16,000
- President: Iván Antoñanzas Manuel
- Head coach: Héctor Blanco
- League: Liga F
- 2025–26: Liga F, 14th
- Website: www.escuelasdefutbol.es
Home colours

Logroño United, formerly known as DUX Logroño, is a Spanish women's football club based in Logroño, that currently plays in Liga F.

== History ==
Logo of DUX Logroño used until 2026

The entity's origins go back to the year 2000 when a project for integrating schools and educational centers of Logroño was carried out. However, the institution was officially founded in 2008 with teams of all ages, including the female senior team. On 3 June 2018, the women's team promoted to Primera División after defeating CD Tacón in the promotion playoffs. The team made their debut in the 2018–19 season, successfully avoiding relegation after ending in the 11th position.

On 7 October 2020, Logroño qualified for the final of the 2019–20 Copa de la Reina, but lost against Barcelona 3–0.

On 1 July 2021, Logroño was bought by DUX Gaming (whose partners are male footballers Thibaut Courtois, Borja Iglesias, and YouTuber DjMariio) and it was renamed as DUX Logroño.

On 25 May 2025, DUX Logroño won the promotion playoffs to return to Liga F for the 2025–26 season.

== Season by season ==
| Season | Division | Place | Copa de la Reina |
|---|---|---|---|
| 2011–12 | Regional | 1st | Did not participate |
| 2012–13 | 2ªP | 9th | Did not participate |
| 2013–14 | 2ªP | 9th | Did not participate |
| 2014–15 | 2ªP | 6th | Did not participate |
| 2015–16 | 2ªP | 1st | Did not participate |
| 2016–17 | 2ªP | 3rd | Did not participate |
| 2017–18 | 2ªP | 1st | Did not participate |
| 2018–19 | 1ª | 11th | Round of 16 |
| 2019–20 | 1ª | 7th | Runner-up |
| 2020–21 | 1ª | 17th | Did not qualify |
| 2021–22 | 2ªP | 4th (North Group) | Third round |
| 2022–23 | 1ª RFEF | 8th | Second round |
| 2023–24 | 1ª RFEF | 7th | Second round |
| 2024–25 | 1ª RFEF | 4th | Round of 16 |
| 2025–26 | 1ª | 14th | Third round |

== Players ==
=== Current squad ===
As of 17 July 2026

Note: Flags indicate national team as defined under FIFA eligibility rules; some limited exceptions apply. Players may hold more than one non-FIFA nationality.

| No. | Pos. | Nation | Player |
|---|---|---|---|
| 2 | DF | ESP | Andrea Colomina |
| 5 | DF | ESP | Natalia Cebolla |
| 6 | DF | ESP | Laura Martínez |
| 7 | FW | DOM | Mía Asenjo |
| 8 | DF | ESP | Marta Masferrer |
| 9 | FW | FRA | Donna Scannapieco |
| 10 | FW | ESP | Isina |
| 11 | DF | AUT | Annelie Leitner |
| 12 | DF | ARG | Milagros Martín |
| 13 | GK | ESP | María Miralles |

| No. | Pos. | Nation | Player |
|---|---|---|---|
| 14 | MF | ARG | Daiana Falfán |
| 15 | MF | URU | Ximena Velazco |
| 16 | FW | ESP | Iraia Jiménez |
| 17 | FW | COD | Flavine Mawete |
| 22 | MF | ARG | Justina Morcillo |
| 23 | DF | BRA | Rebeca |
| 24 | DF | GHA | Comfort Yeboah |
| 30 | GK | ESP | Cecilia Soto |
| — | DF | CZE | Alena Pěčková |

== See also ==
- Category:Dux Logroño players
- Category:Dux Logroño B players (reserve team)
- DUX Internacional de Madrid
