= CD Getafe Femenino =

Spanish football club

- Full name: Club Desportivo de Getafe Femenino
- Founded: 2020; 6 years ago
- president: Miguel Cabello
- Head coach: Blas Ramírez
- 2022–23: 4th
- Website: https://www.getafem.es/
Home colours	Away colours

Club Deportivo Getafe Femenino is a women's association football club based in Getafe. Founded in 2020, the team currently competes in the Southern Group of Spain's Segunda Federación.

== History ==
In 1976, Agrupación Deportiva Alhóndiga was established, making it one of the oldest sports clubs in Getafe. Initially, the club had a men's football section and later added a women's section. This women's section eventually grew to include five categories, from youth teams to the national league, with 90 players. Due to this growth and aligning with the RFEF's efforts to promote women's football, A.D. Alhóndiga decided to transfer its women's section to a new, fully dedicated women's club starting from the 2020–2021 season.

Localización del Estadio (Polideportivo Alhóndiga-Sector III)

Thus was born Club Deportivo y Escuela de Fútbol Getafe Femenino, initially inheriting the same teams and players from the previous club. The primary goal is to gradually expand the number of teams and players. Meanwhile, the existing infrastructure and playing fields remain unchanged.

== Board of directors ==
=== Current staff ===
Position	Staff
President	Miguel Cabello
Sporting Director	Alberto Pascual
Coordinator	Alejandro Flamil
Head coach	Blas Ramírez
Assistant Coach	Jota Torres

== Current players ==
Note: Flags indicate national team as defined under FIFA eligibility rules; some limited exceptions apply. Players may hold more than one non-FIFA nationality.

No.	Pos.	Nation	Player
1	GK	ESP	Paula Suárez
13	GK	ESP	Lucía Márquez
2	DF	COL	Geraldyn Saavedra
3	DF	ESP	Elsa Sánchez
4	DF	CMR	Saturne Nkada
11	DF	ESP	Nadia Dopico
12	DF	ESP	Pau García
21	DF	CMR	Victorie Ngono
6	MF	CMR	Achta Toko
7	MF	VEN	Maikerlin Astudillo
8	MF	ESP	Miriam Labrador
10	MF	ESP	Irene Garcia
14	MF	ESP	Chini Pizarro
16	MF	ESP	Sandra Souto
17	MF	CMR	Camilla Daha
—	FW	CMR	Jennifer Aboudi
—	FW	ESP	Noelia Marín
—	FW	CMR	Raissa Mbappé
—	FW	ESP	Lorena Delgado
—	FW	ESP	Andrea Daves
