= Fundación Albacete =

Spanish football club

- Full name: Fundación Albacete Nexus
- Nickname: "El Funda"
- Founded: 1997; 29 years ago
- Ground: Ciudad Deportiva Andrés Iniesta, Albacete, Castilla-La Mancha
- Capacity: 3,000
- Chairman: Georges Kabchi
- Manager: Carlos del Valle
- League: Primera Federación
- Website: https://www.albacetebalompie.es/femenino/noticias-femenino
Home colours	Away colours

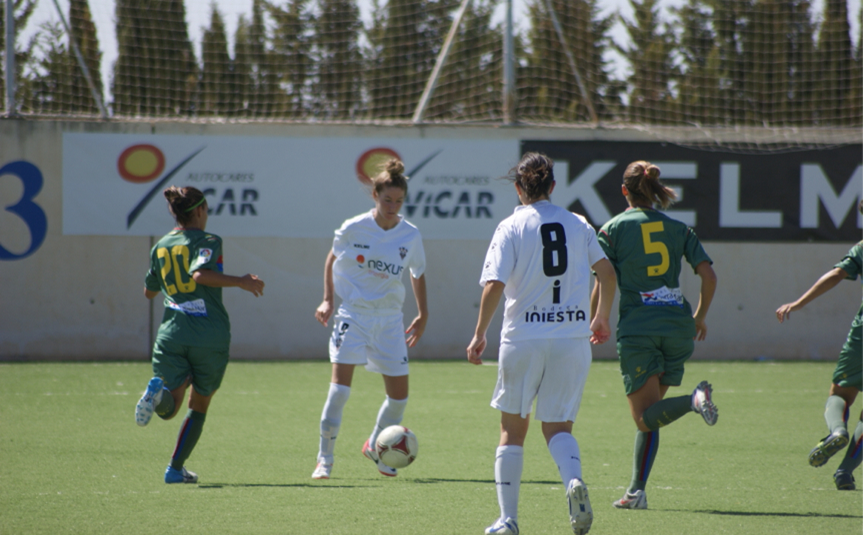
A game between Fundación Albacete and Levante

Fundación Albacete is the women's football section of Albacete Balompié. Founded in 2004 they reached the Spanish league's top division in 2014.

== History ==
Fundación Albacete was founded in 1997 with the aim to promote sport, education and culture by donations of private sponsors and the support of Albacete Balompié as its founder. It also works as part of the structure of the club's football academy.

The women's team of the Foundation promoted to Primera División for the first time in 2014, after six consecutive attempts in the promotion playoffs. Fundación Albacete remained five seasons in the top tier until it was relegated to the Primera División B in 2019.

== Season to season ==
Season	Div.	Pos.	Copa de la Reina
2006–07	2ª	7th	
2007–08	2ª	4th	
2008–09	2ª	2nd	
2009–10	2ª	1st	
2010–11	2ª	2nd	
2011–12	2ª	1st	
2012–13	2ª	1st	
2013–14	2ª	1st	
2014–15	1ª	12th	
2015–16	1ª	13th	
2016–17	1ª	14th	
2017–18	1ª	13th	
2018–19	1ª	16th	Round of 16
2019–20	2ªP	3rd	
2020–21	2ªP		

== Honours ==
- Segunda División (4)
  - 2009–10, 2011–12, 2012–13, 2013–14

== Current squad ==
As of 5 July 2026. Note: Flags indicate national team as defined under FIFA eligibility rules; some limited exceptions apply. Players may hold more than one non-FIFA nationality.

No.	Pos.	Nation	Player
1	GK	ESP	Isabella Fernández
5	DF	ESP	Marina Durán
6	MF	ESP	Leire Peña
11	FW	ESP	Olga San Nicolás
12	MF	ESP	Laura Ortega (captain)
16	MF	ESP	Elisa Tomé
19	FW	ESP	Marina Puebla

No.	Pos.	Nation	Player
21	FW	ESP	Mireya García
23	DF	ESP	María Teresa Pérez
27	MF	ESP	Julia Reyero
29	MF	ESP	Raquel Gallardo
31	GK	ESP	Noemi Caps
31	GK	ESP	Rocío Miquel
