= SE AEM =

Spanish women's football team

- Full name: Secció Esportiva AEM
- Founded: 1925 (club); 2003 (women's team)
- Ground: Municipal de Recasens, Lleida
- Chairman: Carlos Sisteré
- Manager: Rubén López
- League: Primera Federación
- 2024–25: Primera Federación, 3rd of 14
Home colours

Secció Esportiva AEM Women, shortly SE AEM, is a Spanish women's football team from Lleida, Segrià. The club currently plays in the Primera Federación, the second tier of Spanish women's football.

== Players ==
=== Current squad ===
As of 2 February 2024

Note: Flags indicate national team as defined under FIFA eligibility rules; some limited exceptions apply. Players may hold more than one non-FIFA nationality.

No.	Pos.	Nation	Player
1	GK	ESP	Paula Coba
2	DF	ESP	Loba
3	DF	JPN	Minori Chiba
4	DF	JPN	Hitomi Tanaka
5	DF	ESP	Andrea Palacios (captain)
6	MF	ESP	Noelia Fernández
8	FW	ESP	Evelyn Acosta
9	FW	ESP	Mariajo Medina
10	FW	ESP	Vera Rico
11	FW	ESP	Laura Fernández
12	MF	ESP	Aithiara Carballo
13	GK	ESP	Laura Martí
14	DF	ESP	Lorena Reina
15	DF	ESP	Silvia Peñalver

No.	Pos.	Nation	Player
16	DF	ESP	Jennifer Santiago
17	MF	ESP	Alba Quintana
18	MF	ESP	María Cortés
19	MF	ESP	Anita Velázquez
20	MF	ESP	Elisa Tomé
21	FW	ESP	Raquel Quintana
22	DF	ESP	Nuria Ferrer
23	FW	ESP	Ana Recarte-Pacheco
28	MF	ESP	Abril Francés
30	FW	ESP	Meritxell Martorell
—	MF	ESP	Abril Rodrigo
—	FW	URU	Yamila Badell
—	FW	ESP	Mar Rubio
—	DF	ESP	Patricia Teixidó
