= Segunda Federación (women) =

- Founded: 2018 (as Segunda División Pro, second tier); 2022 (as Segunda Federación, third tier)
- Country: Spain
- Confederation: UEFA
- Number of clubs: 42
- Level on pyramid: 3
- Promotion to: Primera Federación
- Relegation to: Tercera Federación
- Current: 2026–27

The Segunda Federación is the third tier of the Spanish women's football league system, beginning with the 2022–23 season.

With a format of three regionalised groups, it is the female equivalent of the men's Primera Federación and is run by the Royal Spanish Football Federation.

== History ==
On 24 July 2018, the Royal Spanish Football Federation agreed to create a new second division between the Primera División, featuring 16 teams, and the Segunda División, in which 112 teams were involved.

In its first season, the league was to be contested by 32 teams divided into two groups: two teams relegated from the 2018–19 Primera División and the 30 best teams from the 2018–19 Segunda División.

In July 2019, the new second tier was renamed as Segunda División Pro being later re-branded as Reto Iberdrola for sponsorship reasons. The level below which had carried that name previously recovered its former name of Primera Nacional.

On 10 June 2020, the Segunda División was granted professionalized league status.

In early 2022, it was confirmed that the league structure would be altered again, after only three seasons: the existing Primera División would be a standalone professional league of 16 teams, the second tier would be a single nationwide 16-team division known as the Primera Federación, the existing Segunda División Pro with two regionalised groups (32 teams) would become the third tier and be named the Segunda Federación, and the existing Primera Nacional division of 96 teams (six regionalised 16-team groups) would become the fourth tier. These levels would be administered by the RFEF and more closely resemble the men's post-2021 structure, albeit only one professional league and six fourth-tier groups rather than five (the fourth level was re-named the Tercera Federación FUTFEM prior to the 2023–24 season).

For the 2025-26 season, the format of the league changed again, with 42 teams competing in 3 groups of 14. The winners of each group are promoted to Primera Federación while the next 2 teams (and the best 3rd place team of all groups) participate in a play-off promotion tournament. The last 3 teams of each group are relegated to Tercera Federación.

== Format ==
In March 2026, new changes were announced to the competition, with 42 teams divided into three groups according to geographical criteria. The three group winners are promoted directly to Primera Federación, as well as the next 4 teams. There will be no play-off promotion in 2027 as 15 teams will be directly promoted to the new format of Primera Federación with 2 groups of 14 teams. Meanwhile, there will be four groups instead of the actual three during the 2027-28 Segunda Federación.

== 2026–27 teams ==
Group 1	Group 2	Group 3
CD Arratia; Real Avilés Industrial; Bizkerre Club; Burgos CF; RC Celta de Vigo; Déportivo de A Coruña B; SD Eibar B; Madrid CFF B; Osasuna B; Real Oviedo; Racing Club Santander; Rayo Vallecano; Real Sporting de Gijón; Victoria CF	SE AEM; Atlético Baleares; FC Barcelona C; Elche CF; RCD Espanyol B; CE Europa; SD Huesca; Levante UD B; Murcia Promises CF; Ona Sant Adrià; CD Samper; Valencia CF B; AD Villaviciosa de Odón; Zaragoza CFF	UD Almería; CD Argual; Real Betis; Cacereño Atlético; Córdoba CF; Femarguín Spar Gran Canaria; EMF Fuensalida; CD Getafe; Guiniguada Apolinario CD; Sporting de Huelva; Málaga CF; Olympia Las Rozas; CF Pozuelo de Alarcón; CF Unión Viera
