= 2024–25 FC Barcelona Femení season =

Barcelona Femení
2024–25 season
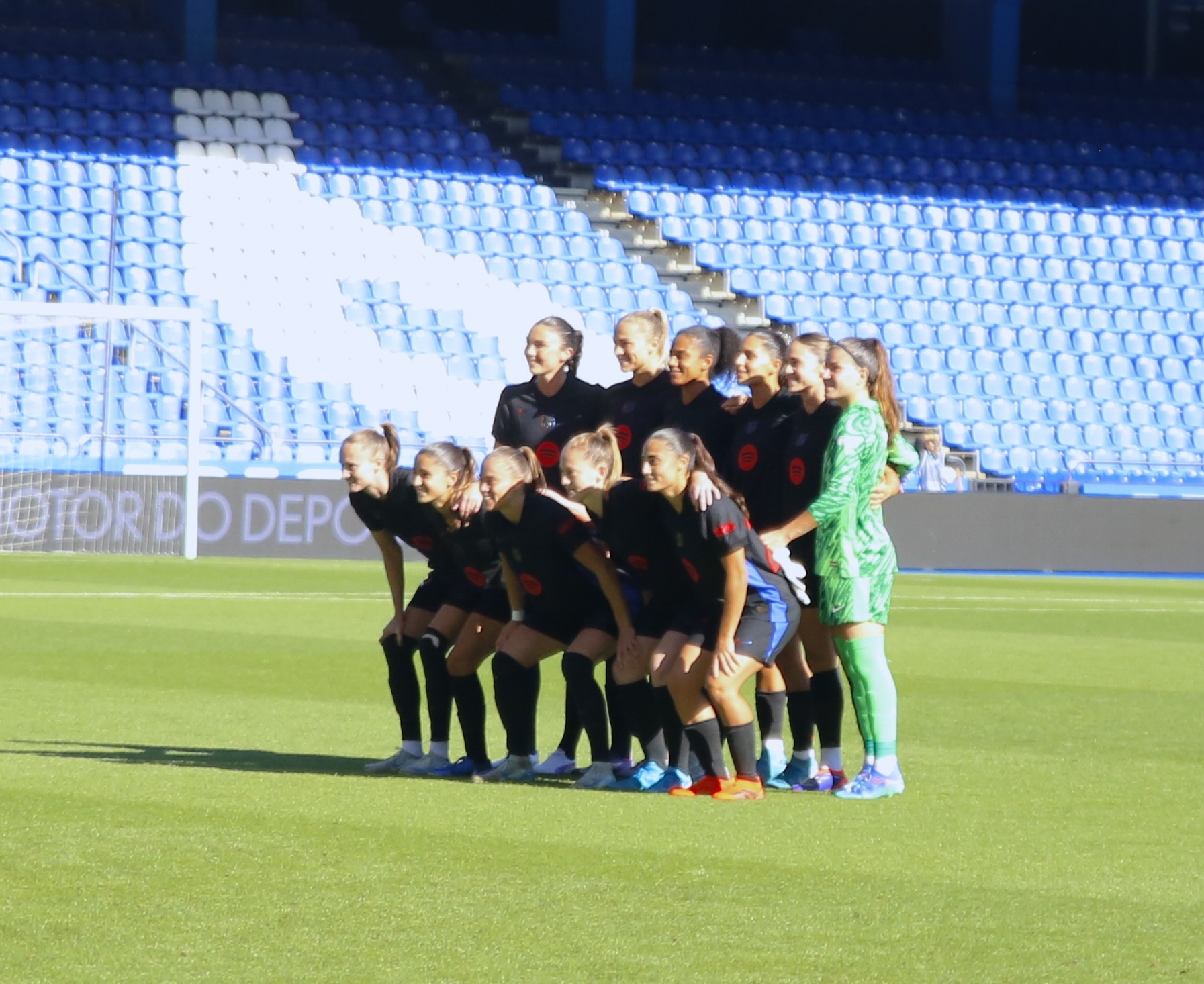
- Starting lineup against Deportivo Abanca on 8 September 2024
- President: Joan Laporta
- Head coach: Pere Romeu
- Stadium: Johan Cruyff Stadium
- Liga F: Winners
- Copa de la Reina: Winners
- Supercopa de España: Winners
- Copa Catalunya: Winners
- UEFA Champions League: Runners-up
- Top goalscorer: League: Ewa Pajor (25 goals); All: Ewa Pajor (43 goals)
- Highest home attendance: 35,812 vs Real Madrid (23 March 2025)
- Lowest home attendance: 2,852 vs St. Pölten (12 November 2024)
- Average home league attendance: 6,711
- Biggest win: Home: Barcelona 10–1 Granada; Barcelona 9–0 Hammarby; Away: Real Betis 0–9 Barcelona
- Biggest defeat: Manchester City 2–0 Barcelona; Barcelona 1–3 Real Madrid
Home colours	Away colours	Third colours
- All statistics correct as of 7 June 2025.

The 2024–25 season is the 37th season in the history of FC Barcelona Femení. The team competed in the domestic league, the Copa de la Reina, Supercopa de España Femenina, UEFA Women's Champions League and Copa Catalunya as defending champions of the first four titles and most all-time champion of the latter. Barcelona was unable to enter the Copa Catalunya in the previous season.

They won the domestic treble, despite some upsets in the league, but failed to retain their Champions League title after losing 0–1 in the final. After Barcelona smoothly advanced to the final of the Copa Catalunya, this match was postponed to be played during pre-season of the 2025–26 season; they ultimately won the title to take their second domestic quadruple.

== Kits ==
- Supplier: Nike
- Sponsors: Spotify (front) / Grupo Bimbo (sleeve) / UNHCR – The UN Refugee Agency (back)

Home (Note: In honour of the club's 125th anniversary, the design of the home kit reflects that of the centenary shirt. It is half-and-half blaugrana, rather than striped, as an homage to the first shirts worn by the club in 1899.) (Note: On Champions League matchday 1, Barcelona Femení wore a modified home kit, to prevent a kit clash: they wore the correct home shirt but used different socks and shorts from home and away kits of the previous season. On 3 November against Eibar, Barcelona Femení wore the home kit with a Coldplay logo in place of the Spotify logo, as part of the sponsorship deal.)	Away (Note: In contrast to the flashback of the home kit, the away kit was designed as "a look into the kits of the future". It is primarily matte black – a colour that has been popular among fans in previous kits – and has a darkened badge rendered in TPU to be transparent and reflective. The details are outlined in maroon and blue, carrying over the half-and-half of the home kit.)	Third (Note: The third kit is a tribute to the club's women's team and their success. The green colour symbolises "the hope and rebirth of the team as well as the dawning of a brand new and vibrant era." The shirt has a subtle pattern of a stylised Venus symbol, used to represent the female gender. Several of the 2024–25 third kits designed by Nike, including Barcelona's, pay tribute to the role of women's football in the modern game by featuring a doubled and rotated swoosh that points upwards to signify "together we rise".)	Fourth (Note: The fourth kit is the same as the 2022–23 and 2023–24 seasons: it features the Catalan senyera flag on the chest horizontally to pay tribute to the club's Catalan identity.)

== Season overview ==
=== Pre-season ===
A variety of transfers for 2024–25 were reported ahead of the season. In December 2023, head coach Jonatan Giráldez announced he would leave the club at the end of the 2023–24 season, and in February 2024, so did goalkeeper Sandra Paños; it was also reported around this time that English goalkeeper Ellie Roebuck would join ahead of the 2024–25 season. In April 2024, Roebuck signed a pre-contract with Barcelona, and Polish striker Ewa Pajor was reported to have done the same. Barcelona B and first team reserve player Júlia Bartel was connected with a move to Chelsea in May 2024.

The previous season ended later than usual, during the summer international window, with the final 2023–24 Liga F game on 16 June 2024. Barcelona had won all four trophies, for a continental quadruple, by the end of May, going into the 2024–25 season as defending champions. In the days after the 2023–24 season ended, Barcelona announced the signings of Pajor, on a three-year contract, and Roebuck, on a two-year contract, as well as promoting assistant Pere Romeu to fill the vacant head coach position. To fill the vacancy for a second assistant, and those of two other members of staff who followed Giráldez to the Washington Spirit, the club hired Enric Lluch as an assistant coach, Nacho Villamía as an analyst, and Víctor Zamora as a physical trainer. Otherwise, Romeu's staff was unchanged from the previous season. Mariona Caldentey confirmed her departure from the club at the start of June, while Ariana Arias and Bartel did so towards the end of the month, when it was also announced that Lucy Bronze would not renew her contract.

On 4 July, Barcelona signed Portuguese player Kika Nazareth from Benfica for four seasons until 2028. María Pérez ended her loan spell at Sevilla, with Lucía Corrales being sent to this club on loan. Giulia Dragoni also moved to AS Roma on loan, after signing a contract renewal until 2027. Pérez then moved to London City Lionesses. On 31 July, the club announced the signing of several players for the B and C teams, including Sydney Schertenleib.

Pre-season matches were played in August, with the first match taking place in Germany: Pajor and Nazareth made their unofficial debuts for the club, with three goal contributions between them in the 5–1 win. Other pre-season games were played in Barcelona and the United States.

=== September ===
Ahead of the season, the nominations for the 2024 Ballon d'Or Féminin (relating to the previous season) were revealed, with eight Barcelona players nominated. Despite this, and the expectation that a player from the team would win the award for the fourth consecutive season, there were still Barcelona players who surprisingly did not receive nominations. Journalist Maria Tikas wrote that the lack of inclusion of such players was "an insult, including to the audience".

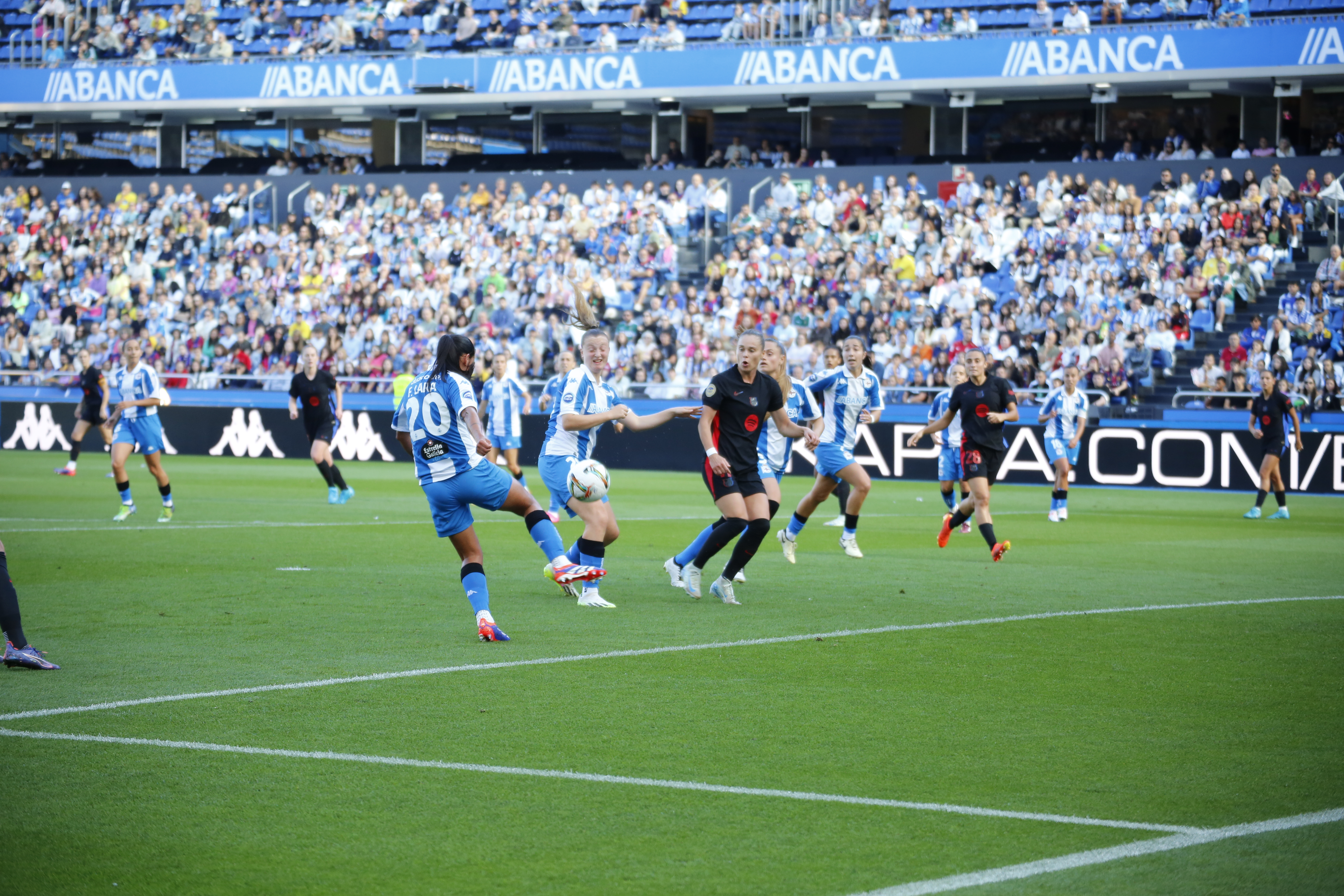
Barcelona away at Deportivo Abanca in September

In Barcelona's first match of the season, Pajor scored her first official goals for the club through two of Barcelona's three goals against Deportivo de La Coruña; described as a slow match, many of the players who had been to the Olympics were rested. Though these players had returned, the next two matches were also low-scoring for Barcelona. Some of this was attributed to the quality performance of Sevilla goalkeeper Esther Sullastres in the third league match.

Barcelona ended the month and their goal drought with a 10–1 win over Granada on 28 September. Pajor scored her first hat-trick with the club and Alexia Putellas converted two penalties, with a variety of other players also getting on the scoresheet, including a Granada own goal. Barcelona also saw one goal, a header from the edge of the box by Keira Walsh, dubiously ruled out due to Putellas being apparently offside earlier in the play. Granada's goal was a long-range effort scored by former Barcelona player Ornella Vignola shortly after this. Ahead of the match, defender Marta Torrejón – one of the goalscorers, for her 70th Barcelona goal – was given a recognition award to mark her twentieth year of elite football. The ten goals set a record for Barcelona scoring at the Johan Cruyff Stadium.

=== October ===
A busy October started with Barcelona playing away at Madrid CFF, a match they won 8–1 despite trailing 0–1 at half time following a first half characterised by refereeing errors, including Madrid's goal that came after the ball went out of play but the referee signalled to continue. Shortly after the second half began, Barcelona equalised – through Walsh, who later added another to mark the first brace of her professional career – and went on to score eight, the most goals scored in a second half by the team in the Liga F. Putellas also scored her first goal from open play in the season to take her Barcelona career tally to 194 goals, equal with László Kubala as the fourth all-time top goalscorer for FC Barcelona.

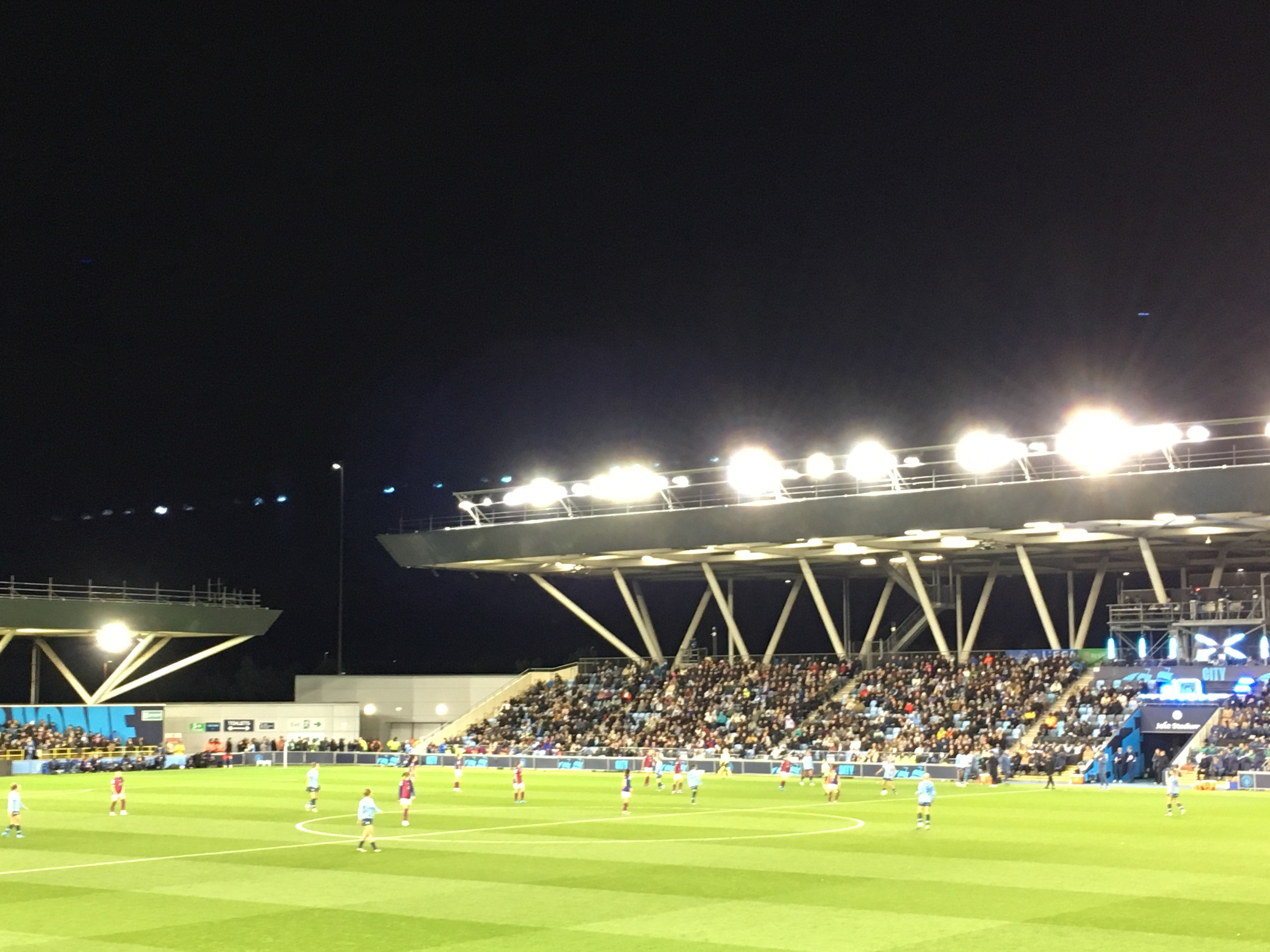
Barcelona away at Manchester City in October

The team started their 2024–25 UEFA Women's Champions League campaign away at Manchester City on 9 October. Barcelona lost 0–2 to mark their second-ever Champions League group stage defeat, and the first time they had failed to score in a Champions League group stage match, despite having more possession and more shots on target. Walsh and Fridolina Rolfö both made their 50th overall Champions League appearances, and a record attendance of 5,508 was set at Manchester's Joie Stadium. In a match of two halves, Manchester City pressed high to pose the stronger threat in the first half, scoring off a corner. Barcelona were the stronger side in the second half but their attempts to equalise did not come to fruition and City added a second goal towards the end of the match.

On 13 October, Barcelona contested the first derbi femení in three years, following Espanyol's return to the top flight. Despite Barcelona recording a commanding 7–1 win and becoming sole leaders of the league, Espanyol had scored first and all of Barcelona's goals came in the second half. With their goal, Espanyol scored away at Barcelona for the first time in over eight years. Barcelona's seven goals in thirty minutes, including three in six minutes and a hat-trick for Pajor, was considered a "scandalous" achievement – but there was concern of Barcelona starting to rely on second-half comebacks, unlike their typical style, and the poor shot conversion rate.

Concerns were somewhat quelled in the next game three days later with a Champions League match at home against Hammarby that Barcelona won 9–0, to match their largest victory in the competition. Barcelona also scored three goals in the first half, though there were still criticisms of the defensive performance, with Mundo Deportivo saying that Hammarby could have also had three first-half goals and only failed to score because they could not take their own chances. Barcelona again had a concerning first half when they returned to league action on 20 October before the international break; they achieved a 4–1 victory over Levante, including Nazareth's first official goal for the team and an improved defense but less clinical attack.

=== November ===
After the club won Women's Club of the Year at the 2024 Ballon d'Or ceremony on 28 October, and Aitana Bonmatí followed Putellas to win a second consecutive Ballon d'Or Féminin, these trophies were presented to the home crowd at the first match in November, at home against Eibar. The team also wore special Coldplay sponsor jerseys. Early in the game, Barcelona won a penalty when Ona Batlle was fouled in the box; Putellas took and successfully converted the penalty to score her 198th goal for Barcelona, drawing level with Luis Suárez as the joint-third all-time top goalscorer at the club.

Barcelona's first match against a direct league rival was away at Atlético Madrid on 9 November. Prior to the game, Atlético Madrid were second in the league with the fewest goals conceded, but Barcelona won the hard-fought game while also managing player minutes due to having a Champions League game and a Women's Clásico match later in the same week. Caroline Graham Hansen had a strong game, scoring a goal and providing the assist for Bonmatí to score her 100th goal for Barcelona. In the Clásico against Real Madrid, Barcelona further consolidated their sole ownership of the league with a convincing victory; before the end of the match, Real Madrid fans were loudly calling for manager Alberto Toril's resignation due to their team's clear inferiority. In front of an Alfredo Di Stéfano Stadium record crowd of 5,210, Barcelona opened scoring within three minutes through Patricia Guijarro, who also scored the second. Toward the end of the match, Putellas scored her ninth Clásico goal to take her to 199 for Barcelona and go clear of Suárez as the third all-time Barcelona goalscorer.

In the Champions League, Barcelona played two back-to-back group games against SKN St. Pölten. In the first, at home, they demonstrated dominance from the start; though they did not score until after the 30th minute, they finished the first half by scoring five goals in twelve minutes to consolidate their improving all-round games. Shortly after play resumed in the second half, Clàudia Pina converted a penalty for her second of the match. St. Pölten continued with a strong defensive performance to shut out Barcelona until the 87th minute, when Graham Hansen scored to make it 7–0. Besides the strong team performance, UEFA highlighted individuals, saying that Walsh and Batlle both could have been player of the match as well as the honoree Pina. Three of the goals were also particularly celebrated: Walsh's powerful long-range shot that was nominated for Champions League goal of the week; Pina's first goal, a jumping cowboy kick with her back to goal that was a replica of Barcelona legend Johan Cruyff's 1973 Wonder Goal; and Graham Hansen's late goal slotted under the goalkeeper. The match was the most-watched live sports broadcast on television in Catalonia during the month, with 916,000 viewers.

Away at St. Pölten, played instead at Viola Park in Vienna to a record crowd of 8,832 for a women's club football match in Austria, Barcelona played well though more patient against a deep-defending St. Pölten. Controlling possession, Barcelona called it "a question of time" for them to score, which came in the form of a brace for Nazareth soon followed by Vicky López's first Champions League goal. In the second half, Putellas scored to reach 200 Barcelona goals; it was also Barcelona's 100th goal in Champions League group stage matches.

In their last match of November before another international break, Barcelona returned to conceding early in their game against Tenerife before mounting a comeback to win 5–1 in an "imperfect game". End of year football awards handed out in November included the Tuttosport Golden Girl and related awards – with López, Bonmatí and on-loan Dragoni honoured – and the ESPN 50 Best Women's Players list. Bonmatí was again named the best women's player by ESPN, receiving a trophy, as one of thirteen players for Barcelona during 2024 named on the list, including four (Bonmatí, Graham Hansen, Caldentey and Walsh) in the top ten.

=== December ===
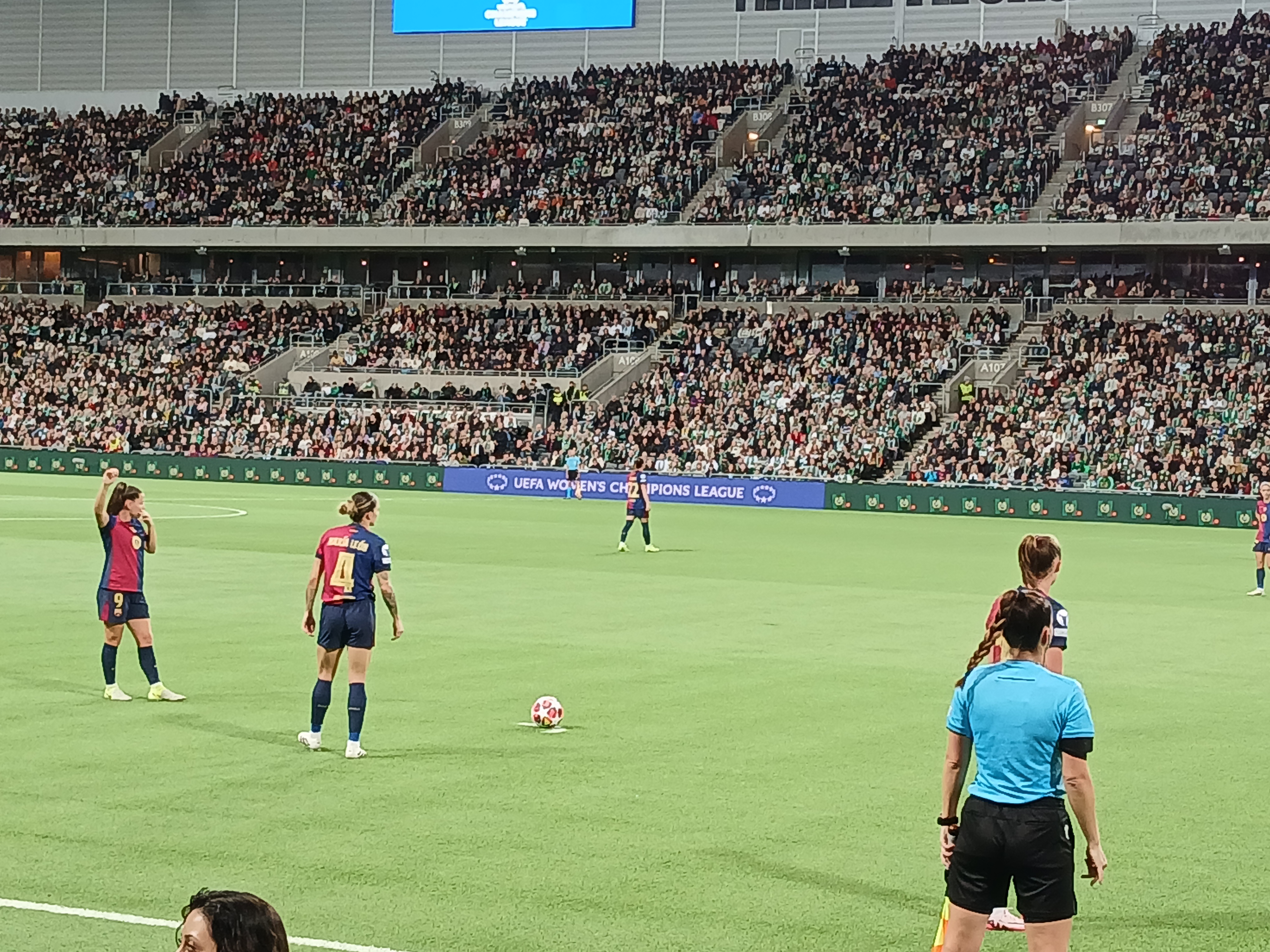
Barcelona away at Hammarby in December 2024

In awards handed out in December, Bonmatí was placed top of The 100 Best Female Footballers in the World for the second year, with many of the team's players appearing on the list including two others (Graham Hansen and Paralluelo) in the Top 10. The newly-separated FIFPRO World 11 and FIFA World 11 were announced: Bonmatí, Putellas and Walsh comprised the midfield of the former, with previous player Bronze again featuring, and 3cat opining that other Barcelona players deserved a place. The latter included six players who represented Barcelona during 2024, with Bronze, Irene Paredes, Batlle, Guijarro, Bonmatí, Graham Hansen and Paralluelo featured. Seven players for Barcelona in 2024 were nominated for the 2024 Best FIFA Women's Player award; Bonmatí repeated her win, with Graham Hansen in third; Bronze in fifth; Paralluelo in sixth; Batlle in ninth; Caldentey in eleventh, and Walsh in thirteenth. Pajor was nominated for 2024 Polish Athlete of the Year, and Rolfö for 2024 Swedish Female Athlete of the Year.

In the Champions League home game against Manchester City, Putellas' edge-of-the-box strike was voted goal of the week. Having been sidelined with injury for several weeks, Putellas was used as a substitute and scored Barcelona's third goal within two minutes of being on the pitch, to take them to the top of the table on goal difference. On a personal level, Putellas matched her 2023–24 season goal tally with her 201st Barcelona goal; Spanish media reported that after her 2022 ACL injury and subsequent complications, Putellas had finally reached her top level again. Diario AS described the match as "exacting revenge" on Manchester City for handing Barcelona their early loss, with Barcelona – despite a strong performance from City goalkeeper Khiara Keating and their continued struggle to finish chances – giving a dominant performance from the start.

At the end of December, FC Barcelona renewed their kit sponsorship deal with Nike, Inc., despite previous disagreements and Barcelona considering self-production to generate more profit. Nike offered an improved deal based on the success and branding of the women's team, paired with Nike's focus on promoting female athletes, reportedly breaking ties with other clubs in order to focus on dressing Barcelona Femení and the Germany men's national football team.

=== January ===
Barcelona started the new year with a 6-0 win away at Real Sociedad with Ewa Pajor scoring her fourth hat trick of the season. Salma Paralluelo also scored a brace, her first two of the season after being out for the early part of the season. The first home game of the year also ended with a 6-0 win with six different goal scorers. On 18 January, Barcelona played away to Athletic club, a matched played at the historic San Mamés in front of a crowd of 17,698 people. Despite dominating the game, Barcelona broke the deadlock with a 90th minute goal from Alexia Putellas. Vicky Lopez scored in 90+4 to seal a 2-0 win.

Barcelona turned their attention to the Supercopa de España semifinal against Atletico Madrid in which they won 3-0.Barcelona won their first trophy of the season; Supercopa de España after beating Real Madrid 5-0 on 26 January 2025.

On 27 January, it was reported that Keira Walsh and Ingrid Engen have put in a transfer request to the club with bids from Chelsea and Olympic Lyon respectively. On 31 January, Keira Walsh completed a deadline day move to WSL champions Chelsea.

=== February ===
On 1 February, the team lost at the Johan Cruyff Stadium for the first time ever, ending a 622-day and 46-game unbeaten run in the league and a six-year unbeaten run at home in the league. Levante, who came into the game with two previous wins in the season and facing relegation, opened scoring and went two goals ahead before Barcelona scored through Rolfö in injury time. Though Levante midfielder Ainhoa Bascuñán was sent off shortly afterwards, Barcelona could not equalise in the remaining extra length of overtime; the match went over 100 minutes.

Against Levante, Romeu had played a much-changed Barcelona team of mostly second-choice players, and had been forced to use Engen (primarily a centre-back) as pivot following Walsh's departure and injury to Guijarro; El País felt that even with a weaker team, Barcelona should have been able to win the game. Romeu said after the match that he had not thought he would need to make substitutions, with the game compared to those earlier in the season when Barcelona mounted large comebacks after not scoring in the first half; when Levante went ahead, he instead changed the attack wholesale and introduced progressive centre-back Mapi León. The team created many chances and had 47 shots, only managing to score one. Still, Romeu said that "under normal circumstances", the team he put out would have won the game, instead criticising Levante for time-wasting and other disruptive play, though he acknowledged such tactics are commonly used against Barcelona in the Liga F. He also reflected that Walsh's departure, and rumours of Engen also leaving, were distractions, but he did not think this affected the team. Paredes said that the team was hurt by losing the match.

=== March ===
On 23 March, Barcelona lost a Clásico match for the first time ever, in front of over 35,000 spectators during a hailstorm at the Estadi Olímpic Lluís Companys. Having been 0–1 down at half time, Barcelona equalised through Graham Hansen – who otherwise had a poor night in terms of finishing – in the second half and then went ahead through a Jana Fernández goal that was incorrectly ruled out for offside. Real Madrid then scored through Caroline Weir to go ahead, before Weir scored her second in added time, ending the match Barcelona 1–3 Real Madrid. The rare result – especially after Barcelona had beaten Real Madrid by significant margins in three 2025 games – and Fernández' disallowed goal saw the match draw international media attention; the disallowed goal was also heavily criticised across Spain. The Liga F announced plans to improve its refereeing standards, which had long been domestically criticised but rarely exposed internationally before, and explore the introduction of VAR shortly afterwards. A meeting between the league and the referees' commission had previously been organised (by 12 March) to be held on 26 March.

On 27 March, Barcelona made it through to the semifinals of the Champions League, with a 10-2 aggregate win against VfL Wolfsburg, having won 4-1 and 6-1 in the first and second leg respectively. They will face Chelsea in the semi-finals in April.

=== April ===
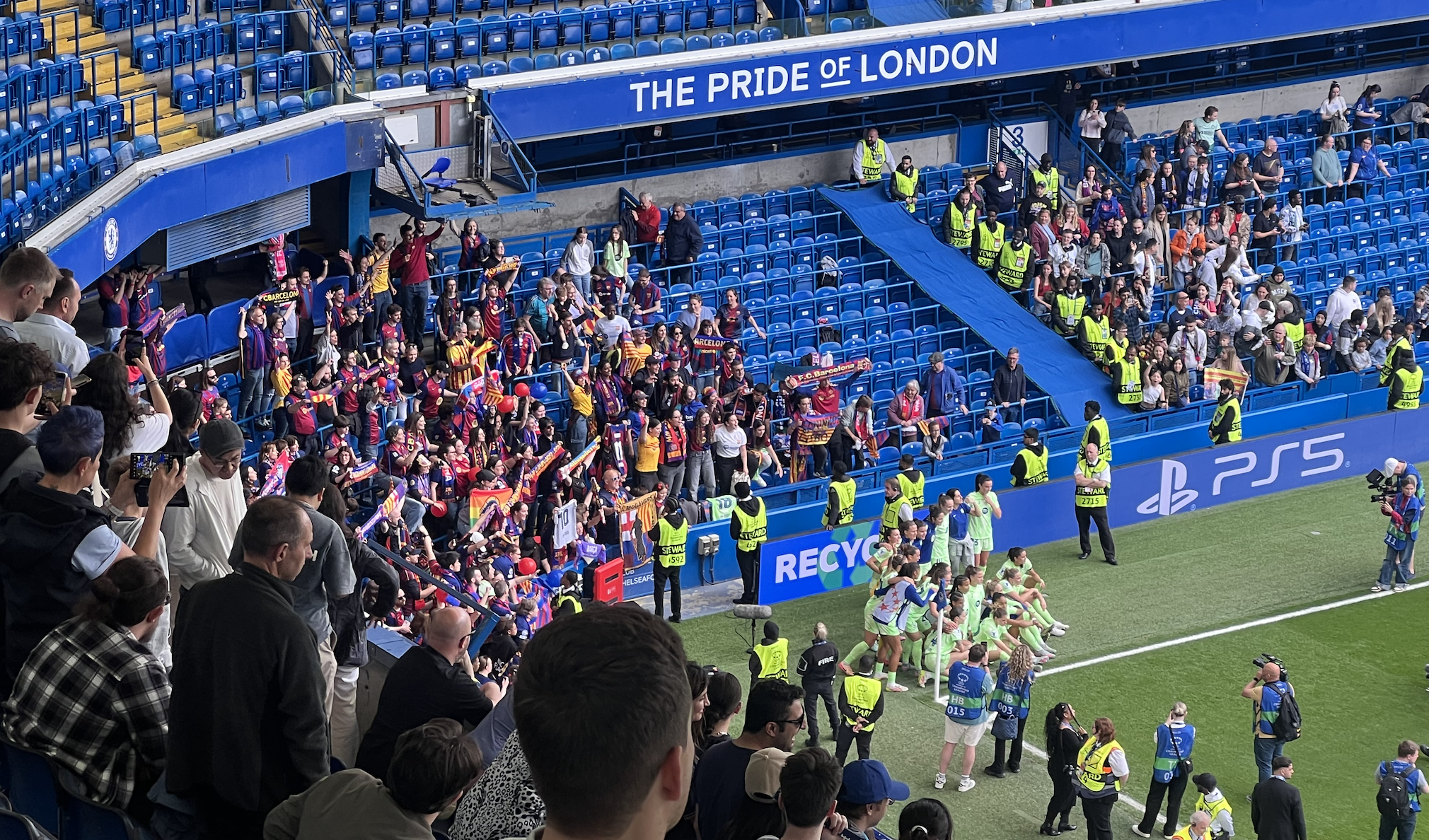
Barcelona celebrate their semi-final victory over Chelsea

== Players ==
=== First team ===
No.	Pos.	Nat.	Name	Age	EU	Since	App.	Goals	Ends	Notes
Goalkeepers
1	GK	(Spain)	Gemma Font	25	EU	2018	34	0	2025	Made in La Masia
13	GK	(Spain)	Cata Coll	24	EU	2019	89	0	2026	
25	GK	(England)	Ellie Roebuck	25	Non-EU	2024	2	0	2026	
Defenders
2	DF	(Spain)	Irene Paredes (4th captain)	33	EU	2021	144	14	2025	
4	DF	(Spain)	Mapi León	29	EU	2017	279	20	2026	
5	DF	(Spain)	Jana Fernández	23	EU	2018	91	5	2025	Made in La Masia
8	DF	(Spain)	Marta Torrejón (vice captain)	35	EU	2013	465	72	2025	
22	DF	(Spain)	Ona Batlle	25	EU	2023	78	10	2026	Made in La Masia
Midfielders
11	MF	(Spain)	Alexia Putellas (captain)	31	EU	2012	465	212	2026	Made in La Masia
12	MF	(Spain)	Patricia Guijarro (3rd captain)	27	EU	2015	347	72	2027	
14	MF	(Spain)	Aitana Bonmatí	27	EU	2016	317	111	2028	Made in La Masia
18	MF	(Portugal)	Kika Nazareth	22	EU	2024	30	6	2028	
19	MF	(Spain)	Vicky López	18	EU	2022	86	21	2028	Made in La Masia
23	MF	(Norway)	Ingrid Engen	27	EU	2022	150	7	2025	
24	MF	(Netherlands)	Esmee Brugts	21	EU	2023	85	16	2027	
Forwards
7	FW	(Spain)	Salma Paralluelo	21	EU	2022	98	62	2026	
9	FW	(Spain)	Clàudia Pina	23	EU	2017	176	79	2026	Made in La Masia
10	FW	(Norway)	Caroline Graham Hansen	30	EU	2019	191	94	2026	
16	FW	(Sweden)	Fridolina Rolfö	31	EU	2021	130	38	2026	
17	FW	(Poland)	Ewa Pajor	28	EU	2024	47	43	2027	
First team players who left during the season
20	DF	(Spain)	Martina Fernández	20	EU	2022	29	3	2026	Made in La Masia
21	MF	(England)	Keira Walsh	28	Non-EU	2022	100	6	2025	

- Last updated: 7 June 2025
- Source: FCBarcelona.com, LaLiga.com and UEFA.com
- Ordered by squad number.

=== Reserve team ===
Players from FC Barcelona Femení B and FC Barcelona Femení C who have a squad number and are eligible to play for the first team (those marked with an asterisk are in regular first team training).

As of 7 June 2025

N	Pos.	Nat.	Name	Age	EU	Since	App	Goals	Ends	Transfer fee	Notes
28	MF	(Spain)	Alba Caño *	21	EU	2022	13	1	2025	Youth system	
29	DF	(Spain)	Noah Bezis Ureña	19	EU	2023	0	0	2025	Youth system	
30	FW	(Switzerland)	Sydney Schertenleib *	18	EU	2024	23	3	2027		
32	FW	(Spain)	Celia Segura	18	EU	2024	1	0		Youth system	
33	FW	(Spain)	Ona Baradad	21	EU	2021	14	1	2025		
34	MF	(Spain)	Clara Serrajordi	17	EU	2024	2	0		Youth system	
35	DF	(Spain)	Judit Pujols *	20	EU	2022	4	0	2025	Youth system	
36	GK	(Spain)	Meritxell Muñoz	21	EU	2020	0	0	2025		
37	GK	(Spain)	Txell Font	20	EU	2022	0	0	2025	Youth system	
38	MF	(Poland)	Emilia Szymczak *	18	EU	2023	0	0	2026		
39	FW	(Spain)	Natalia Escot	18	EU	2024	0	0			
41	FW	(Spain)	Laia Martret	19	EU	2023	0	0	2026	Youth system	
42	DF	(Spain)	Martina González	17	EU	2023	1	0	2026	Youth system	
43	DF	(Spain)	Aïcha Camara	18	EU	2023	1	0	2026	Youth system	
44	DF	(Spain)	Adriana Ranera	19	EU	2022	1	0		Youth system	
45	FW	(Norway)	Martine Fenger	18	EU	2023	1	0			

- Last updated: 7 June 2025
- Source: FCBarcelona.com, LaLiga.com and UEFA.com
- Ordered by squad number.

=== Contract renewals ===
No.	Pos.	Nat.	Name	Date	Until	Source
Barça B coach		(Spain)	Oscar Belis	18 June 2024	2025	
28	MF	(Spain)	Alba Caño	18 June 2024	2025	
36	GK	(Spain)	Meri Muñoz	18 June 2024	2025	
33	FW	(Spain)	Ona Baradad	18 June 2024	2025	
26	MF	(Italy)	Giulia Dragoni	17 July 2024	2027	
14	MF	(Spain)	Aitana Bonmatí	16 September 2024	2028	
19	MF	(Spain)	Vicky López	15 November 2024	2028	
20	DF	(Spain)	Martina Fernández	4 January 2025	2026	
5	DF	(Spain)	Jana Fernández	14 February 2025	2026	
2	DF	(Spain)	Irene Paredes	21 May 2025	2027	

== Transfers ==
=== In ===
No.	Pos.	Nat.	Player	Moving from	Type	Fee	Source
Summer
17	FW	(Poland)	Ewa Pajor	(Germany) VfL Wolfsburg	Transfer	€400,000	
25	GK	(England)	Ellie Roebuck	(England) Manchester City	Transfer	Free	
27	MF	(Spain)	María Pérez	Sevilla	Loan return		
18	MF	(Portugal)	Kika Nazareth	(Portugal) Benfica	Transfer	€400,000	
Total				€800,000			

=== Out ===
No.	Pos.	Nat.	Player	Moving to	Type	Fee	Source
Summer
1	GK	(Spain)	Sandra Paños	(Mexico) Club América	Transfer	Free	
9	FW	(Spain)	Mariona Caldentey	(England) Arsenal	Transfer	Free	
32	FW	(Spain)	Ariana Arias	(Germany) VfL Wolfsburg	Transfer	Free	
39	MF	(Spain)	Júlia Bartel	(England) Chelsea	Transfer	Free	
15	DF	(England)	Lucy Bronze	(England) Chelsea	End of contract	Free agent	
40	FW	(Spain)	Lucía Corrales	Sevilla	Loan		
26	MF	(Italy)	Giulia Dragoni	(Italy) AS Roma	Loan		
19	FW	(Spain)	Bruna Vilamala	(England) Brighton & Hove Albion	Loan		
27	MF	(Spain)	María Pérez	(England) London City Lionesses	Transfer	€50,000	
Winter
20	DF	(Spain)	Martina Fernández	(England) Everton	Loan		
21	MF	(England)	Keira Walsh	(England) Chelsea	Transfer	€550,000	
Total				€600,000			

=== Transfer summary ===
Undisclosed fees are not included in the transfer totals.

Expenditure ▼

Summer: €800,000

Winter: €000,000

Total expenditure: €800,000

Income ▲

Summer: €50,000

Winter: €550,000

Total income: €600,000

Net totals

Summer: ▼€750,000

Winter: ▲€550,000

Total: ▼€200,000

== Pre-season and friendlies ==
Win Draw Loss Fixtures

10 August 2024 Friendly	Hoffenheim (Germany)	1–5	(Spain) Barcelona	Hoffenheim, Germany
12:30 CEST (UTC+2)	Kössler 38'	Report	Pajor 42'; Pina 45'; Engen 59'; Walsh 71'; Vilamala 75'; Szymczak (yellow card) 77'; Rolfö (penalty missed) 88'	Stadium: Rhein-Neckar-Arena; Attendance: 5,268; Referee: Selina Menzel (Germany)

17 August 2024 Friendly	Barcelona (Spain)	5–0	(France) Montpellier	Sant Joan Despí, Spain
19:00 CEST (UTC+2)	Brugts 2'; Pajor 11', 54'; Rolfö 35'; Vilamala 44'	Report		Stadium: Ciutat Esportiva Joan Gamper – Field 7 Referee: Paola Cebollada López (Spain)
Note: The match was played behind closed doors.

23 August 2024 Joan Gamper Trophy	Barcelona (Spain)	2–0	(Italy) AC Milan	Sant Joan Despí, Spain
20:00 CEST (UTC+2)	Pajor 18'; Putellas 90'	Report	Koivisto (yellow card) 45'	Stadium: Estadi Johan Cruyff; Attendance: 5,579; Referee: Sandra González Jiménez (Spain); MVP: Ewa Pajor

27 August 2024 US Tour	Bay FC (United States)	2–5	(Spain) Barcelona	San Jose, California
19:00 PT (UTC−7)	Oshoala 18'; Kundananji 32'	Report	Kika 22'; Graham Hansen 35'; Mapi León 67'; Brugts (yellow card) 83'; Pina 90+1'; Guijarro 90+3'	Stadium: PayPal Park; Attendance: 14,187; Referee: Adorae Monroy (United States)

30 August 2024 US Tour	Dallas Trinity (United States)	0–6	(Spain) Barcelona	Dallas, Texas
19:30 CT (UTC−5)	Davidson (yellow card) 56'	Report	Pina 2', 45+2', 55'; Szymczak 13'; Guijarro 16'; Kika 31'	Stadium: Cotton Bowl; Attendance: 5,387

== Competitions ==
=== Overall record ===
Competition	First match	Last match	Starting round	Final position	Record							
Competition	First match	Last match	Starting round	Final position	Pld	W	D	L	GF	GA	GD	Win %
Liga F	8 September 2024	18 May 2025	Matchday 1	Winners	30	28	0	2	128	16	+112	93.33
Copa de la Reina	21 December 2024	7 June 2025	Round of 16	Winners	5	5	0	0	18	4	+14	100.00
Supercopa de España Femenina	21 January 2025	26 January 2025	Semi-finals	Winners	2	2	0	0	8	0	+8	100.00
Copa Catalunya Femenina	5 February 2025	16 August 2025	Semi-finals	Winners	2	2	0	0	7	0	+7	100.00
UEFA Women's Champions League	9 October 2024	24 May 2025	Group stage	Runners-up	11	9	0	2	44	8	+36	81.82
Total					50	46	0	4	205	28	+177	92.00

Last updated: 18 August 2025
Source: Competitions

Current position
Competition won

=== Liga F ===
==== League table ====
Pos	Team	Pld	W	D	L	GF	GA	GD	Pts	Qualification or relegation
1	Barcelona (C)	30	28	0	2	128	16	+112	84	Qualification for the Champions League league phase
2	Real Madrid	30	24	4	2	87	28	+59	76	Qualification for the Champions League third qualifying round
3	Atlético Madrid	30	16	10	4	49	23	+26	58	Qualification for the Champions League third qualifying round
4	Athletic Club	30	16	3	11	40	32	+8	51	
5	Granada	30	14	3	13	42	45	−3	45	

Source: LigaF.es
Rules for classification: 1) Points; 2) Head-to-head points; 3) Goal difference; 4) Number of goals scored
(C) Champions

==== Results summary ====
Overall								Home						Away					
Pld	W	D	L	GF	GA	GD	Pts	W	D	L	GF	GA	GD	W	D	L	GF	GA	GD
30	28	0	2	128	16	+112	84	13	0	2	71	13	+58	15	0	0	57	3	+54

Last updated: 18 May 2025.
Source: La Liga

==== Results by round ====
Round	1	2	3	4	5	6	7	8	9	10	11	12	13	14	15	16	17	18	19	20	21	22	23	24	25	26	27	28	29	30
Ground	A	H	A	H	A	H	A	H	A	A	H	H	A	H	A	A	H	A	H	A	H	A	H	A	H	H	A	H	A	H
Result	W	W	W	W	W	W	W	W	W	W	W	W	W	W	W	W	L	W	W	W	W	W	L	W	W	W	W	W	W	W
Position	2	2	3	1	1	1	1	1	1	1	1	1	1	1	1	1	1	1	1	1	1	1	1	1	1	1	1	1	1	1

Updated to match(es) played on 18 May 2025. Source: La Liga
A = Away; H = Home; W = Win; D = Draw; L = Loss; P = Postponed

==== Matches ====
8 September 2024 1	Deportivo Abanca	0–3	Barcelona	A Coruña
18:00 CEST (UTC+2)	Pereira (yellow card) 33'	Report	Caño (yellow card) 31'; Brugts (yellow card) 52', (goal) 71'; Pajor 58', 88', (yellow card) 81'; Guijarro (yellow card) 90+1'	Stadium: Estadio Riazor; Attendance: 7,318; Referee: Elia María Martínez Martínez

13 September 2024 2	Barcelona	3–1	Real Sociedad	Sant Joan Despí
20:00 CEST (UTC+2)	Hansen 27', 31'; Alexia 63' (pen.)	Report	Pardo 77'	Stadium: Johan Cruyff Stadium; Attendance: 3,363; Referee: Andrea Firvida Fernández

21 September 2024 3	Sevilla	0–1	Barcelona	Seville
19:00 CEST (UTC+2)	Morcillo (yellow card) 10'; Sullastres (yellow card) 53'; David Losada (yellow card) 67'	Report	Bonmatí 69'	Stadium: Estadio Jesús Navas; Attendance: 1,615; Referee: Beatriz Cuesta Arribas

28 September 2024 4	Barcelona	10–1	Granada	Sant Joan Despí
18:30 CEST (UTC+2)	Pajor 2', 45+3', 69'; Torrejón 35'; Putellas 44' (pen.), 90+3' (pen.); Postigo 45+1' (o.g.); Rolfö 60'; Hansen 65'; Bonmatí 78'	Report	Cardozo (yellow card) 50'; Vignola 55'	Stadium: Johan Cruyff Stadium; Attendance: 4,398; Referee: Alicia Espinosa Ríos

5 October 2024 5	Madrid CFF	1–8	Barcelona	Fuenlabrada
16:00 CEST (UTC+2)	Juanjo Vila (yellow card) 8'; Poljak 15'; López (yellow card) 67'	Report	Walsh (yellow card) 40', (goal) 49', 79'; Pajor 59'; López 61'; Putellas 72'; Engen 80'; Batlle 88'; J. Fernández 90+2'	Stadium: Estadio Fernando Torres; Attendance: 1,064; Referee: Amy Peñalver Pearce

13 October 2024 6	Barcelona	7–1	Espanyol	Sant Joan Despí
17:30 CEST (UTC+2)	Pajor 59', 85', 87'; Putellas 62', 65'; Pina 74', (yellow card) 82'; Bonmatí 79'; Brugts (yellow card) 83'	Report	Botero 20'; Perea (yellow card) 35'; Ballesté (yellow card) 81'	Stadium: Johan Cruyff Stadium; Attendance: 5,148; Referee: Elena Peláez Arnillas

20 October 2024 7	Levante	1–4	Barcelona	Valencia
17:00 CEST (UTC+2)	Cata Coll 23' (o.g.)	Report	López 13'; Kika 36'; Pina 47'; Paredes 81'	Stadium: Estadi Ciutat de València; Attendance: 12,269; Referee: Lorena Del Mar

3 November 2024 8	Barcelona	4–0	Eibar	Sant Joan Despí
18:30 CET (UTC+1)	Putellas 6' (pen.); López 21'; Guijarro 33'; Batlle 59'	Report	Leitner (yellow card) 6'; Peña (yellow card) 90+4'	Stadium: Johan Cruyff Stadium; Attendance: 4,660; Referee: Paola Cebollada López

9 November 2024 9	Atlético Madrid	0–3	Barcelona	Madrid
18:30 CET (UTC+1)		Report	Bonmatí 8'; Hansen 46'; Guijarro 51'	Stadium: Centro Deportivo Wanda; Attendance: 2,207; Referee: Olatz Rivera Olmedo

16 November 2024 10	Real Madrid	0–4	Barcelona	Madrid
20:00 CET (UTC+1)		Report	Guijarro 4', 22'; Pina 39'; Pere Romeu (yellow card) 75'; Rafel Navarro (yellow card) 75'; Putellas 86'	Stadium: Alfredo Di Stéfano Stadium; Attendance: 5,210; Referee: Zulema González González

24 November 2024 11	Barcelona	5–1	Tenerife	Sant Joan Despí
12:00 CET (UTC+1)	Paredes 38'; Pajor 40'; Hansen 45+2' (pen.); Pina 61'; Brugts 77'	Report	Babajide 3'	Stadium: Johan Cruyff Stadium; Attendance: 4,396; Referee: Elisabeth Calvo Valentín

7 December 2024 12	Barcelona	4–1	Real Betis	Sant Joan Despí
19:00 CET (UTC+1)	Brugts 16'; Hansen 22', 37'; Batlle 35'	Report	Zouhir 90'; Santoro (yellow card) 90+1'	Stadium: Johan Cruyff Stadium; Attendance: 4,305; Referee: Andrea Fernández Firvida

15 December 2024 13	Valencia	0–1	Barcelona	Valencia
12:00 CET (UTC+1)	Cristian Toro (yellow card) 32'	Report	Pina (yellow card) 29'; Engen (yellow card) 36'; Rolfö 54' (pen.); Rafel Navarro (yellow card) 66'; Guijarro (yellow card) 66'	Stadium: Mestalla; Attendance: 7,875; Referee: Lorena Del Mar

5 January 2025 16	Real Sociedad	0–6	Barcelona	San Sebastián
13:30 CET (UTC+1)	Cahynova (yellow card) 68'	Report	Pajor 6', 44', 59'; Paralluelo 30', 65'; Bonmatí 81'	Stadium: Campo José Luis Orbegozo; Attendance: 1,212; Referee: Elisabeth Calvo Valentín
Note: The match was originally scheduled for 22 January 2025, but rescheduled due to Barcelona's involvement in the Supercopa de España.

11 January 2025 14	Barcelona	6–0	Levante Badalona	Sant Joan Despí
18:30 CET (UTC+1)	López 10', (yellow card) 55'; Bonmatí 24'; Pajor 38'; Rolfö 56'; Paralluelo 77'; Kika 87'	Report	Young-ju (yellow card) 26'	Stadium: Johan Cruyff Stadium; Attendance: 5,146; Referee: Amy Peñalver Pearce

18 January 2025 15	Athletic Club	0–2	Barcelona	Bilbao
16:15 CET (UTC+1)	Azkona (yellow card) 32'; Aznar (yellow card) 64'; Valero (yellow card) 90+5'	Report	Putellas 90'; López 90+4'	Stadium: San Mamés; Attendance: 17,698; Referee: Alicia Espinosa Ríos

1 February 2025 17	Barcelona	1–2	Levante	Sant Joan Despí
18:30 CET (UTC+1)	Torrejón (yellow card) 42'; Paredes (yellow card) 48'; Rolfö 90+5'	Report	Alharilla 50'; Tarazona (yellow card) 81'; Bascuñán (yellow card) 88' (yellow-red card) 90+6'; Chacón 90+4', (yellow card) 90+9'	Stadium: Johan Cruyff Stadium; Attendance: 4,324; Referee: Lorena del Mar

9 February 2025 18	Espanyol	0–2	Barcelona	Sant Adrià de Besòs
12:00 CET (UTC+1)	Caracas (yellow card) 24'; Vallejo (yellow card) 62'; del Álamo (yellow card) 70'	Report	Bonmatí (yellow card) 60'; Hansen (yellow card) 70', (goal) 73'; Paralluelo 76'	Stadium: Ciutat Esportiva Dani Jarque; Attendance: 1,853; Referee: María Gloria Planes Terol

16 February 2025 19	Barcelona	5–1	Madrid CFF	Sant Joan Despí
16:00 CET (UTC+1)	León 14'; Pajor 30'; Bonmatí (yellow card) 35'; Pere Romeu (yellow card) 45+5'; López 51'; Rolfö 60'; Schertenleib 88'	Report	Bonsegundo 3'; Laborde (yellow card) 73'	Stadium: Johan Cruyff Stadium; Attendance: 4,866; Referee: Elia María Martínez Martínez

2 March 2025 20	Eibar	1–8	Barcelona	Eibar
14:00 CET (UTC+1)	Monnecchi 51'	Report	Pajor 3'; Hansen 29'; López 43'; Guijarro 54'; Paralluelo 57', 75'; Batlle 60'; Torrejón (yellow card) 74'; Pina 90+1'	Stadium: Ipurua; Attendance: 1,310; Referee: Alicia Espinosa Ríos

9 March 2025 21	Barcelona	4–1	Valencia	Sant Joan Despí
12:00 CET (UTC+1)	Putellas 18'; Kika 22'; Pajor 66'; Bonmatí 89'	Report	Martí 15'; Simon (yellow card) 68'	Stadium: Johan Cruyff Stadium; Attendance: 3,967; Referee: Beatriz Cuesta Arribas

15 March 2025 22	Tenerife	0–2	Barcelona	Santa Cruz de Tenerife
17:00 CET (UTC+1)		Report	Putellas 14'; Guijarro 85'	Stadium: Estadio Heliodoro Rodríguez López; Attendance: 9,617; Referee: Andrea Fírvida Fernández

23 March 2025 23	Barcelona	1–3	Real Madrid	Barcelona
12:00 CET (UTC+1)	Putellas (yellow card) 35'; Hansen 67'; Fernández (yellow card) 72'; León (yellow card) 90+7'; Oriol Casares Garcia (red card) 90+9'	Report	Redondo 41'; Weir 87', 90+6'	Stadium: Estadi Olímpic Lluís Companys; Attendance: 35,812; Referee: Olatz Rivera Olmedo

30 March 2025 24	Granada	0–2	Barcelona	Granada
12:00 CET (UTC+2)		Report	López 73'; Putellas 75'	Stadium: Nuevo Estadio de Los Cármenes; Attendance: 8,316; Referee: Beatriz Cuesta Arribas

13 April 2025 25	Barcelona	6–0	Atlético Madrid	Sant Joan Despí
12:00 CET (UTC+2)	Guijarro 17'; Paralluelo 35'; Hansen 54'; Brugts 58'; López 65'; Bonmatí 80'	Report		Stadium: Johan Cruyff Stadium; Attendance: 5,481; Referee: María Eugenia Gil Soriano

16 April 2025 26	Barcelona	5–1	Sevilla	Sant Joan Despí
19:00 CET (UTC+2)	Pajor 25', 34'; López 52'; Caño 56'; Bonmatí 88'	Report	González (yellow card) 20'; Kanteh 45+2'; Corrales (yellow card) 60'	Stadium: Johan Cruyff Stadium; Attendance: 4,196; Referee: María Planes Terol

1 May 2025 27	Levante Badalona	0–2	Barcelona	Badalona
12:00 CET (UTC+2)	Elloh (yellow card) 77'	Report	Paralluelo (yellow card) 33'; Rafel Navarro (yellow card) 45'; Torrejón 60'; Pina (yellow card) 63'; Alexia 88' (pen.)	Stadium: Estadi Municipal de Badalona; Attendance: 2,896; Referee: Elia María Martínez Martínez

4 May 2025 28	Barcelona	4–0	Deportivo Abanca	Sant Joan Despí
17:30 CET (UTC+2)	Pajor 13', 31'; Alexia 72'; Bonmatí 81'	Report		Stadium: Johan Cruyff Stadium; Attendance: 5,057; Referee: Andrea Fírvida Fernández

11 May 2025 29	Real Betis	0–9	Barcelona	Seville
12:00 CET (UTC+2)	Paula Vizoso (red card) 27'	Report	Pajor 3', 83'; Pina 6', 49', 52'; Brugts 40'; Bonmatí 60'; Alexia 67', 86'	Stadium: Estadio Luis del Sol; Attendance: 1,703; Referee: Zulema González González

18 May 2025 30	Barcelona	6–0	Athletic Club	Sant Joan Despí
12:00 CET (UTC+2)	Bonmatí 2'; Pajor 21', 37'; Pina 74', 89'; Brugts 90+1'	Report	Valero (yellow card) 77'	Stadium: Johan Cruyff Stadium; Attendance: 5,552; Referee: Alicia Espinosa Ríos

Last updated: 18 May 2025.
Source: La Liga Liga F

=== Copa de la Reina ===
Barcelona will enter the competition in the Round of 16.

21 December 2024 Round of 16	Tenerife	2–6	Barcelona	Adeje
14:00 CET (UTC+1)	Gavira (yellow card) 28'; Monday 41'; Zaremba (yellow card) 44' (goal) 45+3'; Rodríguez (yellow card) 78'	Report	Paredes 20'; Pajor 24', 79' (pen.), 90+2'; Rolfö (yellow card) 44'; Fernández (yellow card) 61'; Rafel Navarro (red card) 61'; Putellas 66' (pen.), 88'	Stadium: Campo Municipal de Adeje; Attendance: 1,374; Referee: Paola Cebollada

12 February 2025 Quarter-finals	Madrid CFF	1–2	Barcelona	Fuenlabrada
19:00 CET (UTC+1)	Cometti 90+5'	Report	Pajor 6'; Torrejón 40'	Stadium: Estadio Fernando Torres; Attendance: 1,800; Referee: Elena Peláez Arnillas

6 March 2025 Semi-finals – First Leg	Real Madrid	0–5	Barcelona	Madrid
19:00 CET (UTC+1)		Report	Paralluelo 2', 42'; Pajor 14', 29', 78'; Rolfö (yellow card) 69'	Stadium: Alfredo Di Stéfano Stadium; Attendance: 2,185; Referee: Marta Huerta de Aza

12 March 2025 Semi-finals – Second Leg	Barcelona	3–1	Real Madrid	Sant Joan Despí
19:00 CET (UTC+1)	Guijarro 24'; Pajor 48', 68'; Batlle (yellow card) 62'	Report	Méndez (yellow card) 32'; Carmona (yellow card) 35'; Bruun 90+2'	Stadium: Johan Cruyff Stadium; Attendance: 3,689; Referee: Elena Peláez Arnillas

7 June 2025 Final	Barcelona	2–0	Atlético Madrid	Huesca
19:00 CET (UTC+2)	Pina 25', 74'	Report	Pinto (yellow card) 57'	Stadium: Estadio El Alcoraz; Attendance: 7,850; Referee: Marta Huerta de Aza

=== Supercopa de España Femenina ===
22 January 2025 Semifinal	Barcelona	3–0	Atlético Madrid	Leganés
19:00 CET (UTC+1)	Pina 44', 73'; Hansen 90+2'	Report	Queiroz (yellow card) 28'; Ajibade (yellow card) 49'	Stadium: Estadio Municipal de Butarque; Attendance: 4,570; Referee: Eugenia Gil Soriano

26 January 2025 Final	Barcelona	5–0	Real Madrid	Leganés
12:00 CET (UTC+1)	Hansen 31'; Pajor 37', 45+4'; Guijarro 62'; Fernández (yellow card) 81'; Putellas 84'	Report	Toletti (yellow card) 36'	Stadium: Estadio Municipal de Butarque; Attendance: 9,452; Referee: Olatz Rivera Olmedo

=== Copa Catalunya Femenina ===
5 February 2025 Semifinal	SE AEM	0–6	Barcelona	Lleida
19:00 CET (UTC+1)		Report	Pajor 25'; Schertenleib 37'; Fernández 48'; Pina 56', 69'; Brugts 86'	Stadium: Camp d'Esports; Attendance: 10,473; Referee: Sandra González Jiménez

=== UEFA Women's Champions League ===
==== Group stage ====
Pos	Team	Pld	W	D	L	GF	GA	GD	Pts	Qualification	BAR	MCI	HAM	PÖL
1	(Spain) Barcelona	6	5	0	1	26	3	+23	15 (Note: Barcelona 3 Pts, +1 GD; Manchester City 3 Pts, −1 GD.)	Advance to quarter-finals	—	3–0	9–0	7–0
2	(England) Manchester City	6	5	0	1	11	6	+5	15	Advance to quarter-finals	2–0	—	2–0	2–0
3	(Sweden) Hammarby	6	2	0	4	5	17	−12	6		0–3	1–2	—	2–0
4	(Austria) St. Pölten	6	0	0	6	4	20	−16	0		1–4	2–3	1–2	—

Source: UEFA
Rules for classification: Group stage tiebreakers
Notes:

9 October 2024 1	Manchester City (England)	2–0	(Spain) Barcelona	Manchester, England
21:00 CEST (UTC+2)	Layzell 36'; Shaw 77'	Report		Stadium: Academy Stadium; Attendance: 5,508; Referee: Stéphanie Frappart (France)

16 October 2024 2	Barcelona (Spain)	9–0	(Sweden) Hammarby	Sant Joan Despí, Spain
21:00 CEST (UTC+2)	Graham Hansen 10', 75'; Pina 24', 58'; Putellas (yellow card) 38' (goal) 45'; León 53'; Pajor 72'; Brugts 86'; Rolfö 90' (pen.)	Report	Tandberg (yellow card) 60'; Andersson (yellow card) 90'	Stadium: Estadi Johan Cruyff; Attendance: 4,915; Referee: Riem Hussein (Germany)

12 November 2024 3	Barcelona (Spain)	7–0	(Austria) St. Pölten	Sant Joan Despí, Spain
18:45 CET (UTC+1)	Pajor 32'; Nazareth 38'; Bonmatí 40'; Walsh 42'; Pina 45', 52' (pen.); Graham Hansen 87'	Report		Stadium: Estadi Johan Cruyff; Attendance: 2,852; Referee: Eleni Antoniou (Greece)

21 November 2024 4	St. Pölten (Austria)	1–4	(Spain) Barcelona	Vienna, Austria
21:00 CET (UTC+1)	Mädl 59'; D'Angelo (yellow card) 89'	Report	Nazareth 20', 29'; López 31' (yellow card) 53'; Putellas 57'	Stadium: Viola Park; Attendance: 8,832; Referee: Désirée Grundbacher (Switzerland)
Note: The match was hosted by FK Austria Wien at their stadium, Viola Park, in Vienna, due to flooding in Sankt Pölten.

12 December 2024 5	Hammarby (Sweden)	0–3	(Spain) Barcelona	Stockholm, Sweden
21:00 CET (UTC+1)		Report	Guijarro (yellow card) 3'; Pajor 7', 40'; Bonmatí 80'	Stadium: Tele2 Arena; Attendance: 18,746; Referee: Katalin Kulcsár (Hungary)

18 December 2024 6	Barcelona (Spain)	3–0	(England) Manchester City	Barcelona, Spain
18:45 CET (UTC+1)	Pina 44'; Bonmatí 57'; Putellas 69'	Report	Casparij (yellow card) 82'	Stadium: Estadi Olímpic Lluís Companys; Attendance: 29,007; Referee: Jelena Cvetkovic (Serbia)

==== Knockout phase ====
===== Quarter-finals =====
19 March 2025 First leg	Wolfsburg (Germany)	1–4	(Spain) Barcelona	Wolfsburg, Germany
18:45 CET (UTC+1)	Popp (yellow card) 46'; Minge 79'	Report	Dijkstra 26' (o.g.); Paredes 50'; Paralluelo 53'; Schertenleib (yellow card) 86', (goal) 88'	Stadium: AOK Stadion; Attendance: 13,158; Referee: Ivana Projkovska (North Macedonia)

27 March 2025 Second leg	Barcelona (Spain)	6–1 (10–2 agg.)	(Germany) Wolfsburg	Sant Joan Despí
18:45 CET (UTC+1)	Paralluelo 10', 20'; Brugts 41'; Pina 62', 77'; León 90+1'	Report	Beerensteyn 72'; Lattwein (yellow card) 90+1'	Stadium: Johan Cruyff Stadium; Attendance: 4,651; Referee: Stéphanie Frappart (France)

===== Semi-finals =====
20 April 2025 First leg	Barcelona (Spain)	4–1	(England) Chelsea	Sant Joan Despí
18:00 CET (UTC+2)	Pajor 35'; Pina 70', 90', (yellow card) 77'; Paredes 82'	Report	Ramirez (yellow card) 41'; Macario (yellow card) 72'; Baltimore 74'	Stadium: Johan Cruyff Stadium; Attendance: 5,750; Referee: Katalin Kulcsár (Hungary)

27 April 2025 Second leg	Chelsea (England)	1–4 (2–8 agg.)	(Spain) Barcelona	Fulham, England
15:00 CET (UTC+2)	Kaptein 90+1'	Report	Bonmatí 25'; Pajor 41'; Pina 43'; Paralluelo 90'	Stadium: Stamford Bridge; Attendance: 23,573; Referee: Tess Olofsson (Sweden)

===== Final =====
24 May 2025 Final	Arsenal (England)	1–0	(Spain) Barcelona	Lisbon, Portugal
18:00 CET (UTC+2)	Kelly (yellow card) 65'; Blackstenius 74'	Report	Paredes (yellow card) 50'; Pina (yellow card) 87'; Paralluelo (yellow card) 88'	Stadium: Estádio José Alvalade; Attendance: 38,356; Referee: Ivana Martinčić (Croatia)

== Statistics ==
=== Overall ===
As of 7 June 2025

No..	Pos.	Nat.	Player	Liga F		Copa de la Reina		Supercopa de España		Copa Catalunya		Champions League		Total		Discipline		Notes
No..	Pos.	Nat.	Player	Apps	Goals	Apps	Goals	Apps	Goals	Apps	Goals	Apps	Goals	Apps	Goals	Yellow card	Red card	Notes
Goalkeepers
1	GK	(Spain)	Gemma Font	6+1	0	0	0	0	0	1	0	0	0	8	0	0	0	
13	GK	(Spain)	Cata Coll	22	0	5	0	2	0	0	0	11	0	40	0	0	0	
25	GK	(England)	Ellie Roebuck	2	0	0	0	0	0	0	0	0	0	2	0	0	0	
Defenders
2	DF	(Spain)	Irene Paredes	16+7	2	4	1	2	0	0	0	7+3	2	39	5	2	0	
4	DF	(Spain)	Mapi León	21+5	1	2+1	0	2	0	0	0	9+1	2	41	3	2	0	
5	DF	(Spain)	Jana Fernández	16+7	1	1+4	0	0+1	0	0+1	1	4+2	0	36	2	3	0	
8	DF	(Spain)	Marta Torrejón	14+8	2	1+2	1	0+1	0	1	0	2+3	0	32	3	2	0	
22	DF	(Spain)	Ona Batlle	14+8	4	4+1	0	2	0	1	0	8	0	38	4	1	0	
35	DF	(Spain)	Judit Pujols	0+1	0	0	0	0	0	1	0	0+1	0	3	0	0	0	
42	DF	(Spain)	Martina González	0	0	0	0	0	0	0+1	0	0	0	1	0	0	0	
43	DF	(Spain)	Aïcha Camara	0	0	0	0	0	0	0+1	0	0	0	1	0	0	0	
44	DF	(Spain)	Adriana Ranera	0	0	0	0	0	0	0+1	0	0	0	1	0	0	0	
Midfielders
11	MF	(Spain)	Alexia Putellas	17+7	16	3	2	2	1	0	0	8+2	3	39	22	2	0	
12	MF	(Spain)	Patricia Guijarro	17+8	7	3+1	1	2	1	0	0	10+1	0	42	9	3	0	
14	MF	(Spain)	Aitana Bonmatí	19+7	12	4+1	0	1+1	0	0	0	10+1	4	44	16	2	0	
18	MF	(Portugal)	Kika Nazareth	12+7	3	3	0	0+1	0	0+1	0	2+4	3	30	6	0	0	
19	MF	(Spain)	Vicky López	17+8	10	1+2	0	0+1	0	0+1	0	3+5	1	38	11	2	0	
23	MF	(Norway)	Ingrid Engen	19+6	1	4+1	0	0	0	1	0	4+6	0	41	1	1	0	
24	MF	(Netherlands)	Esmee Brugts	14+13	6	4	0	1+1	0	0+1	1	6+5	2	45	9	2	0	
28	MF	(Spain)	Alba Caño	4+5	1	0+1	0	0	0	1	0	0+1	0	12	1	1	0	
34	MF	(Spain)	Clara Serrajordi	0+1	0	0	0	0	0	0+1	0	0	0	2	0	0	0	
Forwards
7	FW	(Spain)	Salma Paralluelo	9+8	7	4+1	2	1+1	0	0	0	4+3	4	31	13	2	0	
9	FW	(Spain)	Clàudia Pina	18+8	10	2+2	2	2	2	0+1	2	6+3	10	42	26	3	0	
10	FW	(Norway)	Caroline Graham Hansen	17+6	11	4	0	1+1	2	0	0	8+1	3	38	16	2	0	
16	FW	(Sweden)	Fridolina Rolfö	16+7	5	1+3	0	1+1	0	1	0	5+4	1	41	6	2	0	
17	FW	(Poland)	Ewa Pajor	22+6	25	4+1	9	2	2	1	1	10+1	6	47	43	1	0	
30	FW	(Switzerland)	Sydney Schertenleib	8+7	1	0+4	0	0	0	1	1	0+3	1	23	3	1	0	
32	FW	(Spain)	Celia Segura	0	0	0	0	0	0	1	0	0	0	1	0	0	0	
33	FW	(Spain)	Ona Baradad	0	0	0	0	0	0	1	0	0	0	1	0	0	0	
45	FW	(Norway)	Martine Fenger	0	0	0	0	0	0	0+1	0	0	0	1	0	0	0	
Players who left during the season but made an appearance
20	DF	(Spain)	Martina Fernández	0+2	0	0	0	0	0	0	0	0	0	2	0	0	0	
21	MF	(England)	Keira Walsh	9+6	2	1	0	1+1	0	0	0	4+1	1	23	3	1	0	
Own goals (1)

=== Goalscorers ===
As of 7 June 2025

Rank	No.	Pos.	Nat.	Player	Liga F	Copa de la Reina	Supercopa de España	Copa Catalunya	Champions League	Total
1	17	FW	(Poland)	Ewa Pajor	25	9	2	1	6	43
2	9	FW	(Spain)	Clàudia Pina	10	2	2	2	10	26
3	11	MF	(Spain)	Alexia Putellas	16	2	1	—	3	22
4	14	MF	(Spain)	Aitana Bonmatí	12	—	—	—	4	16
4	10	FW	(Norway)	Caroline Graham Hansen	11	—	2	—	3	16
6	7	FW	(Spain)	Salma Paralluelo	7	2	—	—	4	13
7	19	MF	(Spain)	Vicky López	10	—	—	—	1	11
8	24	MF	(Netherlands)	Esmee Brugts	6	—	—	1	2	9
8	12	MF	(Spain)	Patricia Guijarro	7	1	1	—	—	9
10	18	MF	(Portugal)	Kika Nazareth	3	—	—	—	3	6
10	16	FW	(Sweden)	Fridolina Rolfö	5	—	—	—	1	6
12	2	DF	(Spain)	Irene Paredes	2	1	—	—	2	5
13	22	DF	(Spain)	Ona Batlle	4	—	—	—	—	4
14	4	DF	(Spain)	Mapi León	1	—	—	—	2	3
14	21	MF	(England)	Keira Walsh	2	—	—	—	1	3
14	30	FW	(Switzerland)	Sydney Schertenleib	1	—	—	1	1	3
14	8	DF	(Spain)	Marta Torrejón	2	1	—	—	—	3
18	5	DF	(Spain)	Jana Fernández	1	—	—	1	—	2
19	23	MF	(Norway)	Ingrid Engen	1	—	—	—	—	1
19	28	MF	(Spain)	Alba Caño	1	—	—	—	—	1
Own goals (from the opponents)					1	—	—	—	1	2
Totals					128	18	8	6	44	204

=== Hat-tricks ===
Player	Against	Minutes	Score after goals	Result	Date	Competition	Ref
(Poland) Ewa Pajor	(Spain) Granada	2', 45+3', 69'	1–0, 5–0, 8–1	10–1 (H)	28 September 2024	Liga F	
(Poland) Ewa Pajor	(Spain) Espanyol	59', 85', 87'	1–1, 6–1, 7–1	7–1 (H)	13 October 2024	Liga F	
(Poland) Ewa Pajor	(Spain) Tenerife	24', 79', 90+2'	0–2, 2–4, 2–6	2–6 (A)	21 December 2024	Copa de la Reina	
(Poland) Ewa Pajor	(Spain) Real Sociedad	6', 44', 59'	0–1, 0–3, 0–4	0–6 (A)	5 January 2025	Liga F	
(Poland) Ewa Pajor	(Spain) Real Madrid	14', 29', 78'	0–2, 0–3, 0–5	0–5 (A)	6 March 2025	Copa de la Reina	
(Spain) Clàudia Pina	(Spain) Real Betis	6', 49', 52'	0–2, 0–4, 0–5	0–9 (A)	11 May 2025	Liga F	

(H) – Home; (A) – Away; (N) – Neutral venue (final)
^{4} – Player scored four goals.

=== Assists ===
As of 7 June 2025

Rank	No.	Pos.	Nat.	Player	Liga F	Copa de la Reina	Supercopa de España	Copa Catalunya	Champions League	Total
1	11	MF	(Spain)	Alexia Putellas	11	1	—	—	4	16
2	12	MF	(Spain)	Patricia Guijarro	8	1	1	—	5	15
3	10	FW	(Norway)	Caroline Graham Hansen	10	1	1	—	2	14
4	14	MF	(Spain)	Aitana Bonmatí	6	1	—	—	5	12
4	22	DF	(Spain)	Ona Batlle	8	—	2	—	2	12
4	17	FW	(Poland)	Ewa Pajor	10	1	—	—	1	12
7	18	MF	(Portugal)	Kika Nazareth	3	2	1	1	3	10
8	9	FW	(Spain)	Clàudia Pina	7	—	—	1	1	9
9	4	DF	(Spain)	Mapi León	6	—	—	—	2	8
10	24	FW	(Netherlands)	Esmee Brugts	4	—	—	1	2	7
11	16	FW	(Sweden)	Fridolina Rolfö	4	2	—	—	—	6
12	30	FW	(Switzerland)	Sydney Schertenleib	3	—	—	1	1	5
13	19	MF	(Spain)	Vicky López	1	—	—	—	2	3
13	7	FW	(Spain)	Salma Paralluelo	3	—	—	—	—	3
15	21	MF	(England)	Keira Walsh	2	—	—	—	—	2
15	28	MF	(Spain)	Alba Caño	1	—	—	1	—	2
15	8	DF	(Spain)	Marta Torrejón	1	1	—	—	—	2
18	2	DF	(Spain)	Irene Paredes	1	—	—	—	—	1
18	5	DF	(Spain)	Jana Fernández	1	—	—	—	—	1
18	33	FW	(Spain)	Ona Baradad	—	—	—	1	—	1
Totals					90	10	5	6	30	141

=== Hat-trick of assists ===
Player	Against	Minutes	Score after assists	Result	Date	Competition	Ref

(H) – Home; (A) – Away; (N) – Neutral venue (final)

=== Cleansheets ===
As of 7 June 2025

Rank	No.	Nat.	Player	Liga F	Copa de la Reina	Supercopa de España	Copa Catalunya	Champions League	Total
1	13	(Spain)	Cata Coll	12	2	2	—	4	20
2	1	(Spain)	Gemma Font	4	—	—	1	—	5
3	25	(England)	Ellie Roebuck	0	—	—	—	—	0
Totals				16	2	2	1	4	25

=== Disciplinary record ===
As of 24 May 2025

No.	Pos.	Nat.	Player	Liga F			Copa de la Reina			Supercopa de España			Copa Catalunya			Champions League			Total		
No.	Pos.	Nat.	Player	Yellow card	(yellow card) (yellow-red card)	Red card	Yellow card	(yellow card) (yellow-red card)	Red card	Yellow card	(yellow card) (yellow-red card)	Red card	Yellow card	(yellow card) (yellow-red card)	Red card	Yellow card	(yellow card) (yellow-red card)	Red card	Yellow card	(yellow card) (yellow-red card)	Red card
Assistant coach		(Spain)	Rafel Navarro	3					1										3		1
Goalkeeper coach		(Spain)	Oriol Casares			1															1
9	FW	(Spain)	Clàudia Pina	3												2			5		
12	MF	(Spain)	Patricia Guijarro	2												1			3		
4	DF	(Spain)	Jana Fernández	1			1			1									3		
Head coach		(Spain)	Pere Romeu	2															2		
24	MF	(Netherlands)	Esmee Brugts	2															2		
14	MF	(Spain)	Aitana Bonmatí	2															2		
8	DF	(Spain)	Marta Torrejón	2															2		
19	MF	(Spain)	Vicky López	1												1			2		
10	FW	(Norway)	Caroline Graham Hansen	1												1			2		
4	DF	(Spain)	Mapi León	1												1			2		
11	MF	(Spain)	Alexia Putellas	1												1			2		
2	DF	(Spain)	Irene Paredes	1												1			2		
7	FW	(Spain)	Salma Paralluelo	1												1			2		
10	FW	(Sweden)	Fridolina Rolfö				2												2		
17	FW	(Poland)	Ewa Pajor	1															1		
28	MF	(Spain)	Alba Caño	1															1		
21	MF	(England)	Keira Walsh	1															1		
23	MF	(Norway)	Ingrid Engen	1															1		
30	FW	(Switzerland)	Sydney Schertenleib													1			1		
22	DF	(Spain)	Ona Batlle				1												1		
Totals				27		1	4		1	1						10			42		2

Source: FCBarcelona.com
Ordered by (red card) , (second yellow card) and (yellow card)
(yellow card) = Number of bookings; (second yellow card) = Number of sending offs after a second yellow card; (red card) = Number of sending offs by a direct red card.

=== Injury record ===
No.	Pos.	Nat.	Name	Type	Status	Source	Match	Inj. Date	Ret. Date
37	GK	(Spain)	Txell Font	Meniscus tear Anterior cruciate ligament injury		Sport	in training	4 December 2023 (Note: Date of club announcement of meniscus tear. Txell Font said later in the month, once she had undergone successful surgery, that she had also torn her ACL.)	7 December 2024
20	DF	(Spain)	Martina Fernández	Lateral meniscus tear — right knee		FCB Twitter	in training	8 June 2024	13 September 2024
25	GK	(England)	Ellie Roebuck	Left occipital infarct		FCB Twitter	–	19 June 2024 (Note: Date Roebuck joined Barcelona. The timeline of her stroke was not revealed, but it was announced in March 2024. Ahead of the first match of pre-season, Barcelona Femení's social media said that Roebuck was still in rehabilitation and not available to play.)	8 October 2024
27	MF	(Spain)	María Pérez	Meniscus tear		AS	with Sevilla	1 July 2024 (Note: Date Pérez returned to Barcelona from loan. The injury was announced in the media in September 2024, when Pérez was set to leave the club.)	14 September 2024 (Note: Date Pérez transferred out of Barcelona.)
31	FW	(Spain)	Laia Martret	Hamstring discomfort		FCB Twitter	in training	10 August 2024	1 September 2024
10	FW	(Norway)	Caroline Graham Hansen	Discomfort		FCB Twitter	in training	17 August 2024	18 August 2024
16	FW	(Sweden)	Fridolina Rolfö	Discomfort		FCB Twitter	in training	23 August 2024	25 August 2024
13	GK	(Spain)	Cata Coll	Discomfort		FCB Twitter	with Spain	23 August 2024	30 August 2024
7	FW	(Spain)	Salma Paralluelo	Discomfort		FCB Twitter	with Spain	23 August 2024	12 December 2024
2	DF	(Spain)	Irene Paredes	Anterior rectus femoris injury — right thigh		FCB Twitter	with Spain	23 August 2024	28 September 2024
31	FW	(Spain)	Laia Martret			Spain Twitter	with Spain	8 September 2024	11 September 2024
20	DF	(Spain)	Martina Fernández	Parameniscitus — right knee		FC Barcelona	in training	31 October 2024	18 December 2024
16	FW	(Sweden)	Fridolina Rolfö	Semimembranosus Tendinopathy — left thigh		FCB Twitter	in training	8 November 2024	7 December 2024
11	MF	(Spain)	Alexia Putellas	Triceps surae muscle injury — right calf		FC Barcelona	vs St. Pölten	21 November 2024	18 December 2024
19	MF	(Spain)	Vicky López	Medial collateral ligament sprain — right knee		FCB Twitter	vs South Korea with Spain	29 November 2024	15 December 2024
18	MF	(Portugal)	Kika Nazareth	Muscle hematoma		FCB Twitter	vs Czech Republic with Portugal	3 December 2024	12 December 2024
31	FW	(Spain)	Laia Martret				vs Alhama with Barcelona B	7 December 2024	12 April 2025
10	FW	(Norway)	Caroline Graham Hansen	Rectus femoris injury – left thigh		FCB Twitter	vs Valencia	15 December 2024 (Note: Graham Hansen had been included in the squad list for (but did not play in) a match after her injury.)	4 January 2025
10	FW	(Norway)	Caroline Graham Hansen	Quadriceps discomfort – right leg		FCB Twitter	in training	10 January 2025	21 January 2025
38	MF	(Poland)	Emilia Szymczak				in training	12 January 2025	16 March 2025
12	MF	(Spain)	Patricia Guijarro	Semimembranosus muscle injury – right thigh		FCB Twitter	in training	1 February 2025	2 March 2025
11	MF	(Spain)	Alexia Putellas	Sprain — left ankle		FCB Twitter	in training	8 February 2025	6 March 2025
25	GK	(England)	Ellie Roebuck	Concussion		FCB Twitter	in training	15 February 2025	1 March 2025
18	MF	(Portugal)	Kika Nazareth	Muscle strain — right aductor		FCB Twitter	vs England with Portugal	21 February 2025	6 March 2025
23	MF	(Norway)	Ingrid Engen	Discomfort — right femoral biceps		Relevo	vs France with Norway	21 February 2025	2 March 2025
16	FW	(Sweden)	Fridolina Rolfö	Discomfort — right knee		FCB Twitter	in training	1 March 2025	6 March 2025
9	FW	(Spain)	Clàudia Pina	Muscle strain — left soleus muscle		FCB Twitter	vs Valencia	9 March 2025	18 March 2025
18	MF	(Portugal)	Kika Nazareth	Left ankle ligament rupture		FCB Twitter	vs Real Madrid	12 March 2025	
25	GK	(England)	Ellie Roebuck	Tibia discomfort — right leg		FCB Twitter	in training	14 March 2025	23 March 2025
22	DF	(Spain)	Ona Batlle	Soleus muscle fibrillar injury — left leg		FCB Twitter	in training	17 March 2025	13 April 2025
10	FW	(Norway)	Caroline Graham Hansen	Sprain — right knee		FCB Twitter	vs Real Madrid	23 March 2025	13 April 2025
16	FW	(Sweden)	Fridolina Rolfö	Discomfort — right knee		FCB Twitter	in training	10 May 2025	18 May 2025
16	FW	(Sweden)	Fridolina Rolfö	Sprain — left ankle		FCB Twitter	vs Denmark with Sweden	3 June 2025	

- Player is injured
- Player has recovered from injury
Last updated: 7 June 2025
Source: FC Barcelona

== Awards ==
Name	Position	Award	Ref.
(Spain) Aitana Bonmatí	Midfielder	Premi Barça Jugadors 2023–24 (4th award - record)	
(Spain) Ona Batlle	Defender	GOAL World-Class Club	
(Spain) Mapi León	Defender	GOAL World-Class Club	
(Spain) Irene Paredes	Defender	GOAL World-Class Club	
(Spain) Aitana Bonmatí	Midfielder	GOAL World-Class Club	
(Spain) Patricia Guijarro	Midfielder	GOAL World-Class Club	
(Spain) Alexia Putellas	Midfielder	GOAL World-Class Club	
(England) Keira Walsh	Midfielder	GOAL World-Class Club	
(Norway) Caroline Graham Hansen	Forward	GOAL World-Class Club	
(Poland) Ewa Pajor	Forward	GOAL World-Class Club	
(Norway) Caroline Graham Hansen	Forward	Pichichi Trophy (2023–24)	
(Norway) Caroline Graham Hansen	Forward	Marca Women's Sports Awards: Liga F MVP 2023–24	
(Spain) Jonatan Giráldez	Head coach	Marca Women's Sports Awards: Liga F Coach of the Season 2023–24	
(Spain) Alexia Putellas	Midfielder	Liga F Player of the month – October	
(Spain) Aitana Bonmatí	Midfielder	Ballon d'Or (2023–24) (2nd award - shared record)	
FC Barcelona		Women's Club of the Year (2023–24) (2nd award - record)	
(Norway) Caroline Graham Hansen	Forward	AFE Award (presented at Marca Sports Awards): Liga F Player of the Season 2023–24	
(Spain) Aitana Bonmatí	Midfielder	Creu de Sant Jordi	
FC Barcelona		AS Sports Awards 2024 – Team of the Year	
(Spain) Vicky López	Midfielder	Golden Girl (2024)	
(Spain) Aitana Bonmatí	Midfielder	Golden Player Woman (2024) (2nd award - record)	
(Italy) Giulia Dragoni	Midfielder	Golden Girl: Best Italian Under-21 Player (2024)	
(Spain) Patricia Guijarro	Midfielder	Liga F Player of the month – November	
(Spain) Aitana Bonmatí	Midfielder	Catalan Football Stars Gala – Best Women's Player (2024)	
(Spain) Clàudia Pina	Forward	Catalan Football Stars Gala – Women's Top Goalscorer (2024)	
(Spain) Celia Segura	Forward	Catalan Football Stars Gala – Most Promising Women's Player (2024)	
(Spain) Aitana Bonmatí	Midfielder	The 10 Best Female Footballers in the World 2024 – #1	
(Norway) Caroline Graham Hansen	Forward	The 10 Best Female Footballers in the World 2024 – #2	
(Spain) Salma Paralluelo	Forward	The 10 Best Female Footballers in the World 2024 – #8	
(England) Lucy Bronze	Defender	FIFPRO World 11 – Women's World XI 2024	
(Spain) Aitana Bonmatí	Midfielder	FIFPRO World 11 – Women's World XI 2024	
(Spain) Alexia Putellas	Midfielder	FIFPRO World 11 – Women's World XI 2024	
(England) Keira Walsh	Midfielder	FIFPRO World 11 – Women's World XI 2024	
FC Barcelona		UPF Barcelona School of Management – Public Figure of the Year (2023)	
(Norway) Caroline Graham Hansen	Forward	Kniksen Honour Award	
(Spain) Aitana Bonmatí	Midfielder	IFFHS Women's World Best Player (2024) (2nd award - shared record)	
(Spain) Vicky López	Midfielder	IFFHS Women's World Best Youth (U20) Player (2024)	
(Norway) Caroline Graham Hansen	Forward	Mundo Deportivo Women's European Football Gala – MVP Trophy	
(Spain) Cata Coll	Goalkeeper	Mundo Deportivo Women's European Football Gala – Excellence Trophy	
(Portugal) Kika Nazareth	Midfielder	Mundo Deportivo Women's European Football Gala – Revelation Trophy	
(Norway) Ingrid Engen	Midfielder	Mundo Deportivo Women's European Football Gala – International Impact Award	
(Spain) Aitana Bonmatí	Midfielder	The Best FIFA Women's Player (2024) (2nd award - shared record)	
(England) Lucy Bronze	Defender	2024 The Best FIFA Women's World 11	
(Spain) Irene Paredes	Defender	2024 The Best FIFA Women's World 11	
(Spain) Ona Batlle	Defender	2024 The Best FIFA Women's World 11	
(Spain) Patricia Guijarro	Midfielder	2024 The Best FIFA Women's World 11	
(Spain) Aitana Bonmatí	Midfielder	2024 The Best FIFA Women's World 11	
(Norway) Caroline Graham Hansen	Forward	2024 The Best FIFA Women's World 11	
(Spain) Salma Paralluelo	Forward	2024 The Best FIFA Women's World 11	
(Spain) Aitana Bonmatí	Midfielder	IFFHS Women's World's Best Playmaker 2024 (2nd award)	
(Spain) Aitana Bonmatí	Midfielder	IFFHS Women's World Team 2024	
(Norway) Caroline Graham Hansen	Midfielder	IFFHS Women's World Team 2024	
(Spain) Salma Paralluelo	Forward	IFFHS Women's World Team 2024	
(Spain) Vicky López	Midfielder	IFFHS Women's Youth (U20) World Team 2024	
FC Barcelona		IFFHS Women’s World Best Club 2024 (4th award)	
FC Barcelona		World Soccer Magazine – Women's World Team of the Year 2024 (2nd award - record)	
(Spain) Aitana Bonmatí	Midfielder	World Soccer Magazine – Women's World Player of the Year 2024 (2nd award - record)	
(Spain) Aitana Bonmatí	Midfielder	ESPN FC Best Women's Footballer (2nd award)	
(Spain) Óscar Belis	Barcelona B coach	RFEF Primera Federación Coach of the Season 2023–24	
(Norway) Caroline Graham Hansen	Midfielder	Gullballen – Best Norwegian Female Player of the Year 2024 (5th award - record)	
(Spain) Cata Coll	Goalkeeper	IFFHS Women's UEFA Team 2024	
(England) Lucy Bronze	Defender	IFFHS Women's UEFA Team 2024	
(Spain) Aitana Bonmatí	Midfielder	IFFHS Women's UEFA Team 2024	
(Spain) Alexia Putellas	Midfielder	IFFHS Women's UEFA Team 2024	
(Spain) Mariona Caldentey	Midfielder	IFFHS Women's UEFA Team 2024	
(Norway) Caroline Graham Hansen	Forward	IFFHS Women's UEFA Team 2024	
(Spain) Salma Paralluelo	Forward	IFFHS Women's UEFA Team 2024	
(Italy) Giulia Dragoni	Midfielder	IFFHS Women's Youth (U20) UEFA Team 2024	
(Spain) Vicky López	Forward	IFFHS Women's Youth (U20) UEFA Team 2024	
(Spain) Aitana Bonmatí	Midfielder	433 Awards: Women's Player of the Year (2024) (2nd award)	
(Spain) Clàudia Pina	Forward	IFFHS Women's Player of the Month – April	
(Poland) Ewa Pajor	Forward	Liga F Player of the month – April	
(Spain) Aitana Bonmatí	Midfielder	UEFA Women's Champions League Player of the Season (2024–25) (3rd award – record)	
(Spain) Mapi León	Defender	UEFA Women's Champions League Team of the Season (2024–25)	
(Spain) Patricia Guijarro	Midfielder	UEFA Women's Champions League Team of the Season (2024–25)	
(Spain) Aitana Bonmatí	Midfielder	UEFA Women's Champions League Team of the Season (2024–25)	
(Spain) Clàudia Pina	Forward	UEFA Women's Champions League Team of the Season (2024–25)	
(Spain) Clàudia Pina	Forward	Liga F Player of the month – May	
