= Golden Boy (award) =

Football award given to the most impressive young male player playing in Europe

- 2026 Golden Boy winner Pau Cubarsí
- Sport: Association football
- Country: Italy
- Presented by: Tuttosport

History
- First award: 2003
- Editions: 24
- Most recent: (Spain) Pau Cubarsí (2026)
- Website: tuttosport.com

The Golden Boy is an award established by Italian sports newspaper Tuttosport, that is given by sports journalists to a young male footballer playing in Europe perceived to have been the most impressive during a calendar year (two halves to two separate seasons). All nominees must be under the age of 21 and play in a European nation's top tier. Apart from the main award, an additional one, Golden Boy Web, is decided by online users.

Rafael van der Vaart became the first recipient in 2003 by winning it at the age of 20 years and 304 days. To this day, he remains the oldest winner of the award. Lionel Messi is the only player to have won both the prestigious Golden Boy award and the Ballon d'Or. He received the Golden Boy in 2005 at the age of 18 years and 173 days, and remained the youngest winner until Gavi won the award in 2022 at 18 years and 77 days, who was also surpassed by Lamine Yamal in 2024, winning the award at the age of 17 years and 137 days. The current winner is Pau Cubarsí of Barcelona.

== Selection ==
The prize was established by Italian sports newspaper Tuttosport in 2003. Newspapers that now participate in voting include Bild (Germany), Blick (Switzerland), A Bola (Portugal), L'Équipe (France), France Football (France), Marca (Spain), Mundo Deportivo (Spain), Ta Nea (Greece), Sport Express (Russia), De Telegraaf (Netherlands), and The Times (United Kingdom). Each juror is allowed to nominate five players; the juror allocates 10 points to their most impressive pick, 7 for second, 5 for third, 3 for fourth, and 1 point for fifth.

== Winners ==
Year	Winner	Club(s)	Position	Birth year	Award age	Ref(s)
2003	(Netherlands) Rafael van der Vaart	(Netherlands) Ajax	Midfielder	1983	20 years, 304 days	
2004	(England) Wayne Rooney	(England) Everton (England) Manchester United	Forward	1985	19 years, 50 days	
2005	(Argentina) Lionel Messi	(Spain) Barcelona	Forward	1987	18 years, 173 days	
2006	(Spain) Cesc Fàbregas	(England) Arsenal	Midfielder	1987	19 years, 212 days	
2007	(Argentina) Sergio Agüero	(Spain) Atlético Madrid	Forward	1988	19 years, 188 days	
2008	(Brazil) Anderson	(England) Manchester United	Midfielder	1988	20 years, 237 days	
2009	(Brazil) Alexandre Pato	(Italy) Milan	Forward	1989	20 years, 102 days	
2010	(Italy) Mario Balotelli	(Italy) Inter Milan (England) Manchester City	Forward	1990	20 years, 13 days	
2011	(Germany) Mario Götze	(Germany) Borussia Dortmund	Midfielder	1992	19 years, 189 days	
2012	(Spain) Isco	(Spain) Málaga	Midfielder	1992	20 years, 245 days	
2013	(France) Paul Pogba	(Italy) Juventus	Midfielder	1993	20 years, 264 days	
2014	(England) Raheem Sterling	(England) Liverpool	Forward	1994	20 years, 12 days	
2015	(France) Anthony Martial	(France) Monaco (England) Manchester United	Forward	1995	20 years, 14 days	
2016	(Portugal) Renato Sanches	(Portugal) Benfica (Germany) Bayern Munich	Midfielder	1997	19 years, 67 days	
2017	(France) Kylian Mbappé	(France) Monaco (France) Paris Saint-Germain	Forward	1998	18 years, 307 days	
2018	(Netherlands) Matthijs de Ligt	(Netherlands) Ajax	Defender	1999	19 years, 127 days	
2019	(Portugal) João Félix	(Portugal) Benfica (Spain) Atlético Madrid	Forward	1999	20 years, 17 days	
2020	(Norway) Erling Haaland	(Germany) Borussia Dortmund	Forward	2000	20 years, 123 days	
2021	(Spain) Pedri	(Spain) Barcelona	Midfielder	2002	18 years, 362 days	
2022	(Spain) Gavi	(Spain) Barcelona	Midfielder	2004	18 years, 77 days	
2023	(England) Jude Bellingham	(Germany) Borussia Dortmund (Spain) Real Madrid	Midfielder	2003	20 years, 159 days	
2024	(Spain) Lamine Yamal	(Spain) Barcelona	Forward	2007	17 years, 137 days	
2025	(France) Désiré Doué	(France) Paris Saint-Germain	Forward	2005	20 years, 154 days	
2026	(Spain) Pau Cubarsí	(Spain) Barcelona	Defender	2007	19 years, 291 days	

== Awards won by position ==
As of 9 November 2026

Position	Win(s)
Forward	12
Midfielder	10
Defender	2

== Awards won by nationality ==
As of 9 November 2026

Country	Win(s)	Year(s)
Spain	6	2006, 2012, 2021, 2022, 2024, 2026
France	4	2013, 2015, 2017, 2025
England	3	2004, 2014, 2023
Netherlands	2	2003, 2018
Argentina	2	2005, 2007
Brazil	2	2008, 2009
Portugal	2	2016, 2019
Italy	1	2010
Germany	1	2011
Norway	1	2020

== Awards won by club ==
As of 9 November 2026

Year in bold have shared the win with other clubs.

Club	Win(s)	Year(s)
(Spain) Barcelona	5	2005, 2021, 2022, 2024, 2026
(Germany) Borussia Dortmund	3	2011, 2020, **2023** (Note: Shared with Real Madrid.)
(England) Manchester United	3	**2004**, (Note: Shared with Everton.) 2008, **2015** (Note: Shared with Monaco.)
(Netherlands) Ajax	2	2003, 2018
(Spain) Atlético Madrid	2	2007, **2019** (Note: Shared with Benfica.)
(France) Monaco	2	**2015**, (Note: Shared with Manchester United.) **2017** (Note: Shared with Paris Saint-Germain.)
(Portugal) Benfica	2	**2016** (Note: Shared with Bayern Munich.), **2019** (Note: Shared with Atlético Madrid.)
(France) Paris Saint-Germain	2	**2017**, 2025
(England) Everton	1	**2004**
(England) Arsenal	1	2006
(Italy) Milan	1	2009
(England) Manchester City	1	**2010** (Note: Shared with Inter Milan.)
(Italy) Inter Milan	1	**2010** (Note: Shared with Manchester City.)
(Spain) Málaga	1	2012
(Italy) Juventus	1	2013
(England) Liverpool	1	2014
(Germany) Bayern Munich	1	**2016**
(Spain) Real Madrid	1	**2023** (Note: Shared with Borussia Dortmund.)

== See also ==
- Bravo Award
- Kopa Trophy
- Ballon d'Or
- Golden Girl (award)
