= Tuttosport =

Italian sport newspaper

- The front-page story on 3 December 2006 covered the 100th Anniversary of Torino FC
- Type: Daily sports newspaper
- Owner: Roberto Amodei (via Periodica S.r.l.)
- Publisher: Nuova Editoriale Sportiva
- Founded: 1945; 81 years ago
- Language: Italian
- Headquarters: Corso Svizzera 185, Turin, Italy
- Circulation: 64,355 (2012)
- Website: www.tuttosport.com

Tuttosport is a daily sports newspaper based in the city of Turin, Italy.

== History and profile ==
Tuttosport was first published on 30 July 1945. Renato Casalbore (who later died in the 1949 Superga air disaster alongside the Grande Torino football squad) founded the newspaper as a bi-weekly. In 1946, it moved to three editions a week, and since 12 March 1951 it has been published daily. The paper has its headquarters in Turin. It is published in broadsheet format. Typical issues have 28 or 32 pages and are produced in four editions, targeted respectively at Turin, Rome, Milan, and Genoa.

The newspaper is edited by Xavier Jacobelli; his predecessors have included Vittorio Oreggia, Paolo De Paola, Giancarlo Padovan, Antonio Ghirelli, and Gianpaolo Ormezzano.

== Circulation ==
Tuttosport had a circulation of 123,921 copies in 2004. The circulation of the paper was 115,533 copies in 2008. In 2012 the paper sold 64,355,791 copies.

== Golden Boy Award ==
The Golden Boy award is given out to the top under-21-year-old football player active in Europe.

== Golden Player Man Award ==
The Golden Player Award is given out to the top over 21 year old football player active in Europe.

2020	Robert Lewandowski	Poland	FC Bayern Munich
2021	Robert Lewandowski	Poland	FC Bayern Munich
2022	Karim Benzema	France	Real Madrid CF
2023	Erling Haaland	Norway	Manchester City
2024	Toni Kroos	Germany	Real Madrid CF
2025	Diogo Jota	Portugal	Liverpool FC

== Golden Player Woman Award ==
The Golden Player Woman Award is given out to the top over 21 year old female football player active in Europe.

2021	Lieke Martens	Netherlands	FC Barcelona
2022	Alexia Putellas	Spain	FC Barcelona
2023	Aitana Bonmatí	Spain	FC Barcelona
2024	Aitana Bonmatí	Spain	FC Barcelona
2025	Leah Williamson	England	Arsenal

== Golden Girl Award ==
The Golden Girl award is given out to the top under 21 year old female football player active in Europe.

== Best Italian Golden Boy Award ==
The Best Italian Golden Boy Award is given out to the top under 21 year old Italian football player active in Europe.

2023	Giorgio Scalvini	Italy	Atalanta
2024	Michael Kayode	Italy	Fiorentina
2025	Pio Esposito	Italy	Inter Milan

== Best Italian Golden Girl Award ==
The Best Italian Golden Girl Award is given out to the top under 21 year old female Italian football player active in Europe.

2023	Chiara Beccari	Italy	Sassuolo
2024	Giulia Dragoni	Italy	AS Roma
2025	Eva Schatzer	Italy	Juventus

== The Youngest Award ==
The Youngest Award is given out to the youngest football player to be nominated in the history of the Golden Boy award.

2023	Lamine Yamal	Spain	Barcelona

== See also ==
- List of newspapers in Italy
- Mass media in Italy
