= Bravo Award =

Italian association football award

- Sport: Association football
- Awarded for: The most outstanding under-21 player in any European league
- Local name: Trofeo Bravo (Italian)
- Country: Italy
- Presented by: Guerin Sportivo

History
- First award: 1978
- Editions: 38
- Final award: 2015
- First winner: Jimmy Case (ENG)
- Most wins: Emilio Butragueño (ESP); Ronaldo (BRA); 2 times each
- Most recent: Domenico Berardi (ITA)

The Bravo Award was an annual award which was handed out by the Italian magazine Guerin Sportivo to the most outstanding young European footballer.

The first winner of the award was Englishman Jimmy Case. The first non-European to win the award was Eli Ohana in 1988.

The award was discontinued after the 2015 edition.

== History and regulations ==
In 1977, Guerin Sportivo's editorial staff established the award to celebrate the best young footballers in European football. The jury was composed by Guerin Sportivo's and Radiocorriere TV's journalist as well as foreign sports journalists from the most important news outlets across Europe.

Since the inception and until 1992, only under-23 players participating in one of the three European club cups (UEFA Champions League, UEFA Cup, UEFA Cup Winners' Cup) were eligible. The rules changed in 1992, when under-21 player from any European League became eligible, regardless of their participation in any European club cups.

The winners were chosen for the autumn-spring season, not the calendar year.

== List of winners ==
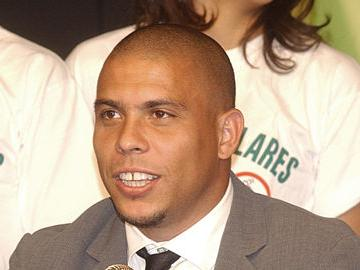
Together with Butragueño, Ronaldo was the only player to win the award twice

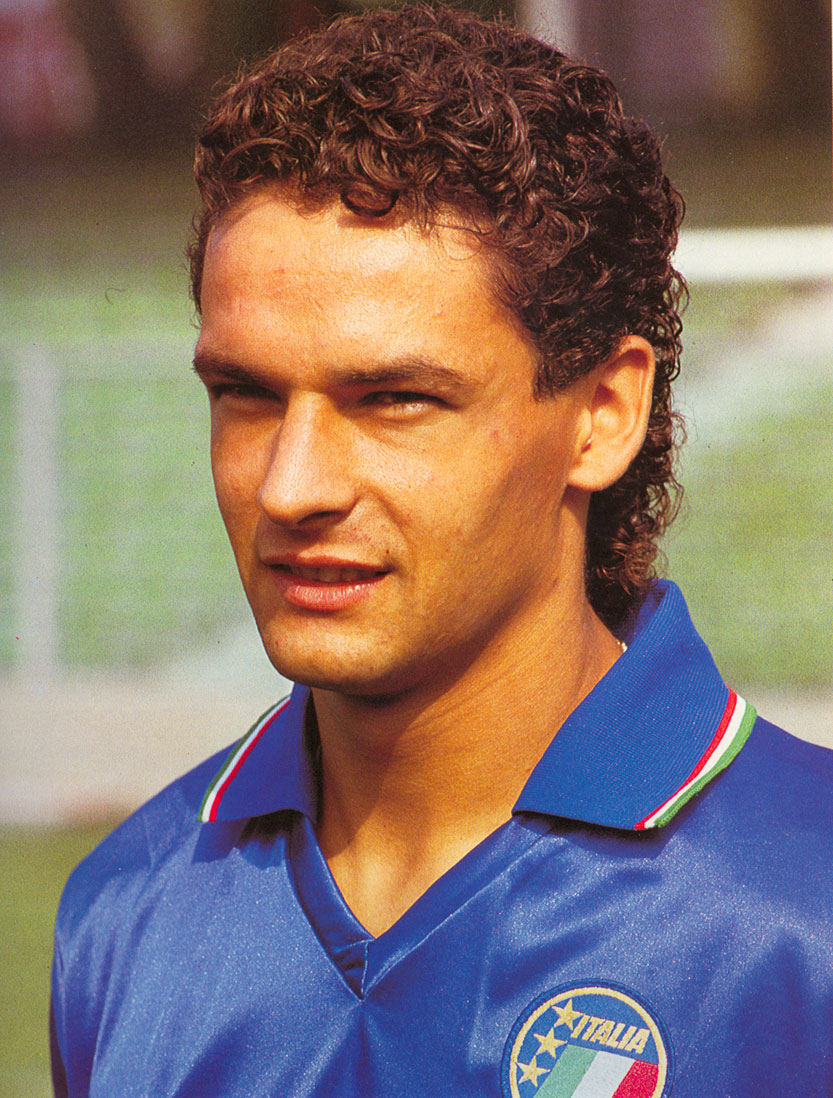
Roberto Baggio won the award in 1990

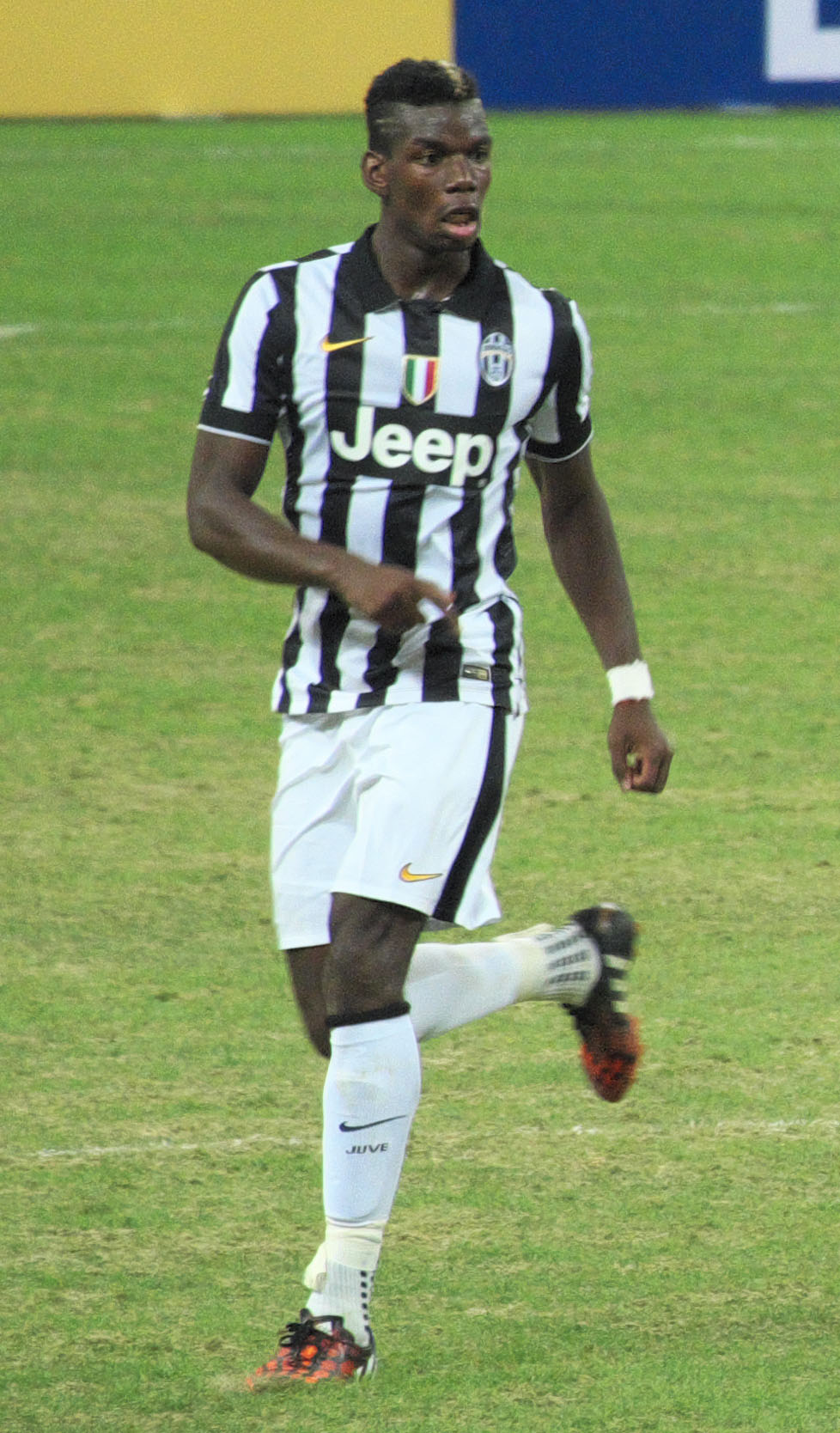
Paul Pogba was one of the latest recipients of the award in 2014

Year	Player	Club	Ref(s)
1978	(England) Jimmy Case	(England) Liverpool	
1979	(England) Garry Birtles	(England) Nottingham Forest	
1980	(Germany) Hansi Müller	(Germany) VfB Stuttgart	
1981	(Scotland) John Wark	(England) Ipswich Town	
1982	(England) Gary Shaw	(England) Aston Villa	
1983	(San Marino) Massimo Bonini	(Italy) Juventus	
1984	(Italy) Ubaldo Righetti	(Italy) Roma	
1985	(Spain) Emilio Butragueño	(Spain) Real Madrid	
1986	(Spain) Emilio Butragueño	(Spain) Real Madrid	
1987	(Netherlands) Marco van Basten	(Netherlands) Ajax	
1988	(Israel) Eli Ohana	(Belgium) Mechelen	
1989	(Italy) Paolo Maldini	(Italy) Milan	
1990	(Italy) Roberto Baggio	(Italy) Fiorentina	
1991	(Socialist Federal Republic of Yugoslavia) Robert Prosinečki	(Socialist Federal Republic of Yugoslavia) Red Star Belgrade	
1992	(Spain) Pep Guardiola	(Spain) Barcelona	
1993	(Wales) Ryan Giggs	(England) Manchester United	
1994	(Italy) Christian Panucci	(Italy) Milan	
1995	(Netherlands) Patrick Kluivert	(Netherlands) Ajax	
1996	(Italy) Alessandro Del Piero	(Italy) Juventus	
1997	(Brazil) Ronaldo	(Spain) Barcelona	
1998	(Brazil) Ronaldo	(Italy) Internazionale	
1999	(Italy) Gianluigi Buffon	(Italy) Parma	
2000	(Spain) Iker Casillas	(Spain) Real Madrid	
2001	(England) Owen Hargreaves	(Germany) Bayern Munich	
2002	(Germany) Christoph Metzelder	(Germany) Borussia Dortmund	
2003	(England) Wayne Rooney	(England) Everton	
2004	(Portugal) Cristiano Ronaldo	(England) Manchester United	
2005	(Netherlands) Arjen Robben	(England) Chelsea	
2006	(Spain) Cesc Fàbregas	(England) Arsenal	
2007	(Argentina) Lionel Messi	(Spain) Barcelona	
2008	(France) Karim Benzema	(France) Lyon	
2009	(Spain) Sergio Busquets	(Spain) Barcelona	
2010	(Germany) Thomas Müller	(Germany) Bayern Munich	
2011	(Belgium) Eden Hazard	(France) Lille	
2012	(Italy) Marco Verratti	(Italy) Pescara	
2013	(Spain) Isco	(Spain) Málaga	
2014	(France) Paul Pogba	(Italy) Juventus	
2015	(Italy) Domenico Berardi	(Italy) Sassuolo	

== See also ==
- Golden Boy (award)
- Kopa Trophy
- Ballon d'Or
- Golden Girl (award)
