= Eva Schatzer =

Italian footballer (born 2005)

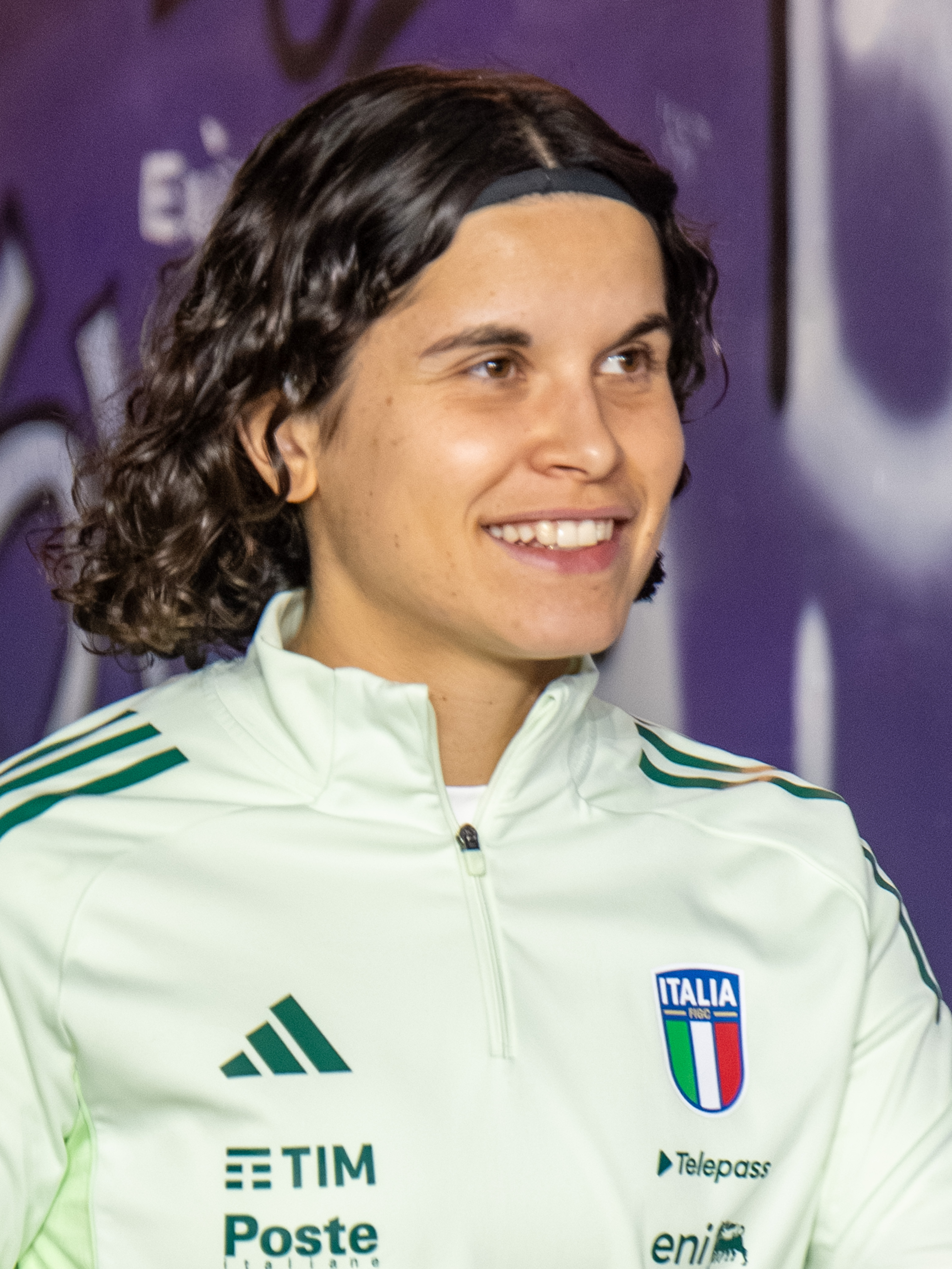
- Schatzer with Italy in 2025

Personal information
- Date of birth: 16 January 2005 (age 21)
- Place of birth: Brixen, Italy
- Position: Midfielder

Team information
- Current team: Juventus
- Number: 6

Youth career
- 2014–2020: Brixen OBI
- 2020–2023: Juventus

Senior career*
Years	Team	Apps	(Gls)
2023–	Juventus	37	(3)
2023–2024	→ Sampdoria (loan)	23	(2)

International career^{‡}
2021–2022	Italy U17	8	(3)
2022–2024	Italy U19	9	(1)
2023	Italy U23	1	(0)
2024–	Italy	11	(0)
- * Club domestic league appearances and goals as of 10 May 2026 (UTC) ‡ National team caps and goals as of 11 October 2026

Eva Schatzer (born 16 January 2005) is an Italian footballer who plays as a midfielder for Juventus and the Italian national team.

== Club career ==
Schatzer joined Juventus in the summer of 2020, first in the youth sector and then in the first team from the 2023 season.

== International career ==
Schatzer has represented Italy at youth and senior level.

On 25 June 2025, Schatzer was called up to the Italy squad for the UEFA Women's Euro 2025.

== Career statistics ==
=== Club ===
As of match played 1 February 2026

Appearances and goals by club, season and competition
Club	Season	League			Cups		Continental		Total	
Club	Season	Division	Apps	Goals	Apps	Goals	Apps	Goals	Apps	Goals
Juventus	2022-23	Serie A	0	0	2	0	0	0	2	0
Juventus	Total		0	0	2	0	0	0	2	0
Sampdoria	2023-24	Serie A	23	2	2	0	0	0	19	2
Sampdoria	Total		23	2	2	0	0	0	23	2
Juventus	2024-25	Serie A	21	3	4	0	6	0	31	1
Juventus	2025–26	Serie A	8	0	6	1	5	1	19	2
Juventus	Total		29	3	10	1	11	1	50	3
Career total			52	5	14	1	16	1	82	7

=== Youth ===
As of match played 9 April 2024

Appearances and goals by national youth team and year
National team	Year	Apps	Goals
Italy U17	2021	3	0
Italy U17	2022	5	3
Italy U19	2022	4	1
Italy U19	2023	8	0
Italy U19	2024	3	0
Total		23	4

=== Senior ===
As of match played 8 April 2025

Appearances and goals by national youth team and year
National team	Year	Apps	Goals
Italy	2024	2	0
Italy	2025	6	0
Total		8	0

== Honours ==
Juventus

- Serie A: 2024–25
- Coppa Italia: 2022–23, 2024–25
- Supercoppa Women: 2025
- Serie A Women's Cup: 2025, 2026

Individual

- Best Italian Golden Girl: 2025
- Serie A Team of the Season (Under-23): 2025–26
