= Golden Girl (award) =

Football award given to the most impressive young female European player

Golden Girl Award
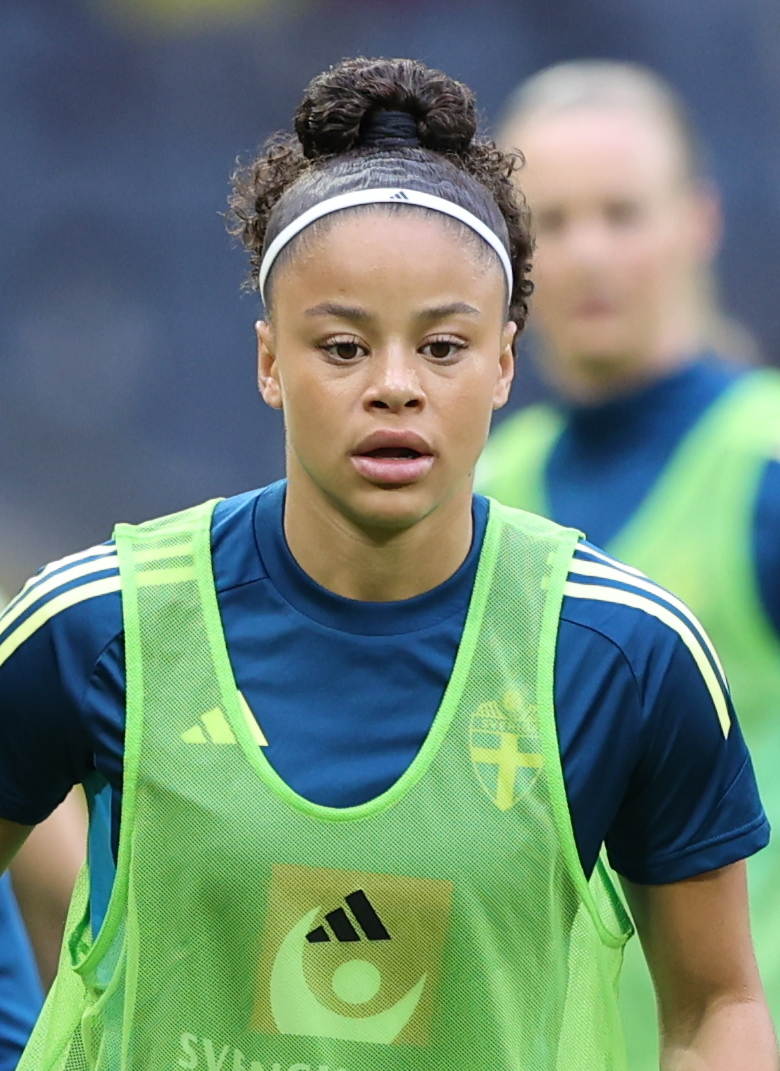
- 2026 Golden Girl Felicia Schröder
- Sport: Association football
- Country: Italy
- Presented by: Tuttosport

History
- First award: 2022
- Editions: 4
- Most recent: (Sweden) Felicia Schröder

The Golden Girl is an award that is given by sports journalists to a young female footballer playing in Europe perceived to have been the most impressive during a calendar year (two halves to two separate seasons). All nominees must be under the age of 21 and play in a European nation's top tier.

== Selection ==
The prize was established by the Italian sports newspaper Tuttosport in 2022. It is awarded along with the Golden Boy given to the best under-21 male footballer. It is presented by Tuttosport based on the votes of 50 sports journalists. The journalists who participate in the voting include Bild (Germany), Blick (Switzerland), A Bola (Portugal), l'Équipe (France), France Football (France), Marca (Spain), Mundo Deportivo (Spain), Ta Nea (Greece), Sport Express (Russia), De Telegraaf (Netherlands), and The Times (United Kingdom).

Players must be on a team in a top division in one of the top 25 leagues in Europe based on UEFA coefficient rankings as of May or June of that year in order to be eligible for the Golden Girl award.

A final selection of 10 applicants is produced by the panel from a shortlist of 100 players. Journalists from all throughout Europe then cast their votes for the prize. The journalists cast their votes for the top three options, giving the top option five points, the second option three points, and the third option one point. The player with the most points at the end is crowned the winner after those points are tallied to get the final rankings.

== Winners ==
Year	Winner	Club(s)	Position	Birth year	Ref(s)
2022	(Germany) Jule Brand	(Germany) Hoffenheim (Germany) Wolfsburg	Midfielder	2002	
2023	(Colombia) Linda Caicedo	(Spain) Real Madrid	Forward	2005	
2024	(Spain) Vicky López	(Spain) Barcelona	Midfielder	2006	
2025	(England) Michelle Agyemang	(England) Arsenal (England) Brighton & Hove Albion (loan)	Forward	2006	
2026	(Sweden) Felicia Schröder	(Sweden) BK Häcken (Spain) Real Madrid	Forward	2007	

== Awards won by position ==
As of 4 November 2025

Position	Win(s)
Forward	3
Midfielder	2

== Awards won by nationality ==
As of 4 November 2025

Country	Win(s)	Year(s)
Germany	1	2022
Colombia	1	2023
Spain	1	2024
England	1	2025
Sweden	1	2026

== Awards won by club ==
As of 9 November 2026

Year in bold have shared the win with other clubs.

Club	Win(s)	Year(s)
(Spain) Real Madrid	2	2023, **2026** (Note: Shared with BK Häcken.)
(Germany) Hoffenheim	1	**2022** (Note: Shared with Wolfsburg.)
(Germany) Wolfsburg	1	**2022** (Note: Shared with Hoffenheim.)
(Spain) Barcelona	1	2024
(England) Arsenal	1	**2025** (Note: Shared with Brighton & Hove Albion load.)
(England) Brighton & Hove Albion	1	**2025** (Note: Shared with Arsenal.)
(Sweden) BK Häcken	1	**2026** (Note: Shared with Real Madrid.)

== Best Italian Golden Girl ==
The Best Italian Golden Girl Award is given out to the top under 21 year old Italian female football player active in Europe.

Year	Winner	Club(s)	Position	Birth year	Ref(s)
2024	Giulia Dragoni	(Spain) Barcelona; Roma (loan)	Midfielder	2006	
2025	Eva Schatzer	Juventus	Midfielder	2005	
2026	Giulia Galli	Roma (Spain) Barcelona	Forward	2008	

== See also ==
- Bravo Award
- Golden Boy (award)
- Kopa Trophy
- Ballon d'Or
