= Maria Tikas =

Spanish sports journalist

Maria Tikas Pueyo
- Born: Sant Cugat del Vallès, Catalonia, Spain
- Education: Ramon Llull University (BA in Journalism and Corporate Communication)
- Occupation: Sports journalist
- Employer: Sport
- Known for: Coverage of FC Barcelona Femení and women's football

Maria Tikas Pueyo is a Spanish sports journalist.

== Early life and education ==
Maria Tikas is from Sant Cugat del Vallès in Catalonia. She graduated with a degree in Journalism and Corporate Communication from University Ramon Llull; she chose to specialise in sports journalism in her fourth year, having done an internship in social media at FC Barcelona and being a football fan. During her degree, she studied abroad as part of the Erasmus Programme.

== Career ==
Tikas currently writes for daily sports newspaper Sport, particularly focusing on the teams of FC Barcelona, especially FC Barcelona Femení. She has also contributed to discussion of women's football in Spain, including for the Catalan Football Federation's talk show L'Orsai and for BBC Sport.

She began her career at a smaller newspaper, and then joined Sport as a social media manager before taking on a content producing role. After two years fulfilling various roles with the newspaper, she was given a role regularly writing on women's football; she credits the growth in visibility of women's football with allowing for women's sports journalists to become visible, too.

One of the first women to helm football journalism in Spain, she has suffered machistic and misogynistic harassment. A particular incident that saw the prevalence of misogyny towards women in sport in Spain be discussed was when Tikas praised Barcelona footballer Nico González in a report after a match in November 2021, with social media responses treating her praise of his performance as infatuation. Both the Catalan and Spanish journalism federations denounced such treatment. Reports noted that such comments were commonplace, and some could be worse, and this incident had only made the headlines because Tikas called it out. Later in the month, she interviewed female sports journalists from across Spain, publishing a report on their experiences, from receiving hate to not being taken seriously.
