= Spain women's national football team results =

Overview of the results of Spain's women's national football team

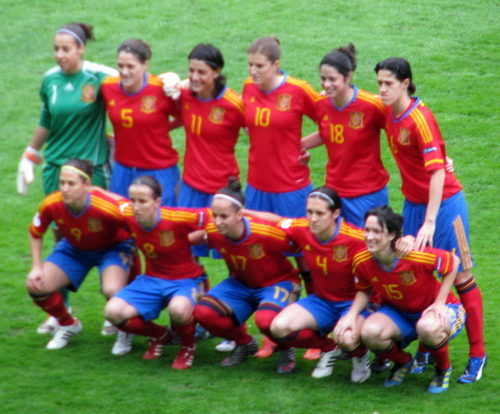
Spain women's national team in 2012.

The Spain women's national football team started play in 1983. Women's football was long received with skepticism in Spain, and the Royal Spanish Football Federation (RFEF) banned official matches from 1970 to 1981. However, the women's national team enjoyed great popularity in its early days, even as an unofficial team, although due to the weariness and lack of interest of RFEF officials, its progress stagnated since its official status until well into the 21st century, with the exception of the period between 1994 and 1997.

The women's national team is one of the most successful women's football teams in Europe. They are world champions, having won the 2023 tournament, and the first-ever Nations League champions. Spain is also one of only two nations to have won both the women's and men's tournaments; Germany is the other. And it is one of the four teams that have ever topped the FIFA Women's World Ranking.

These are the Spain women's national football team all time results:

== Results ==
=== 1983–1989 ===
5 Feb 1983 Friendly	Spain	0–1	Portugal	A Guarda
		Report	São Tato 59'	Stadium: Estadio del Tecla; Attendance: 2,000; Referee: Raúl García de Loza (Spain)

30 Mar 1983 Friendly	Spain	0–0	Switzerland	Aranjuez
18:30		Report		Stadium: Municipal; Attendance: 3,200; Referee: Lamo Castillo (Spain)

10 Dec 1983 Friendly	France	2–0	Spain	Perpignan
	Constantin 15'; Musset 55'	Report		Stadium: Stade Jean-Laffon; Attendance: 1,000; Referee: Claude Bouillet (France)

17 Mar 1984 Friendly	Spain	2–2	France	Barcelona
19:00	Milagros 11'; Emilia 64'	Report; Report; Report	Provost 40'; Wolf 44'	Stadium: Mini Estadi; Attendance: 6,000; Referee: Miguel Pérez (Spain)

12 May 1984 Friendly	Switzerland	0–1	Spain	Oerlikon
16:30		Report	Hernández 12'	Stadium: Sportplatz Neudorf; Attendance: 1,100; Referee: Bürki (Switzerland)

27 Apr 1985 1987 EC Q	Hungary	1–0	Spain	Szekszárd
16:00	Lovász 55'	Report		Stadium: Városi Stadion; Attendance: 5,000; Referee: Streng (Romania)

25 May 1985 1987 EC Q	Spain	0–2	Switzerland	Cuenca
18:00		Report	Moser 40'; Sauter 70'	Stadium: La Fuensanta; Attendance: 4,500; Referee: Claude Bouillet (France)

3 Nov 1985 1987 EC Q	Spain	2–3	Italy	Palma
12:00	Prieto 12'; Hernández 41'	Report	Vignotto 14', 62'; Pierazzuoli 72'	Stadium: Estadio Lluís Sitjar; Referee: Guedes (Portugal)

5 Apr 1986 1987 EC Q	Spain	1–2	Hungary	Gijón
17:00	Pubill 12'	Report	Oroszki 58'; Lovász 61'	Stadium: Escuela de Fútbol de Mareo; Attendance: 4,000; Referee: Luis Marioa da Silva (Portugal)

10 Jun 1986 1987 EC Q	Switzerland	0–3	Spain	Solothurn
17:00		Report	Y. García 46'; Hernández 59', 75'	Stadium: Stadion FC Solothurn; Attendance: 595; Referee: Wiss (Luxembourg)

11 Oct 1986 1987 EC Q	Italy	1–1	Spain	Modena
14:00	Morace 21'	Report	Y. García 30'	Stadium: Stadio Alberto Braglia; Referee: Soldatic (Yugoslavia)

18 Feb 1987 Friendly	France	1–0	Spain	Istres
	Puentes 46'	Report		Stadium: Stade Bernard Bardin; Attendance: 1,500; Referee: Marcel Pignol (France)

11 Oct 1987 1989 EC Q	Bulgaria	1–1	Spain	Sofia
18:00	Lekova 66'	Report	Hernández 56'	Stadium: Vasil Levski National Stadium; Referee: Octavian Streng (Romania)

8 Nov 1987 1989 EC Q	Czechoslovakia	1–0	Spain	Bratislava
10:00	Tricaricoova 31'	Report		Stadium: Petržalka; Attendance: 1,000; Referee: Bela Szabo (Hungary)

19 Dec 1987 1989 EC Q	Spain	1–0	Belgium	Aranjuez
15:45	Artola 79'	Report		Stadium: Municipal; Attendance: 1,000; Referee: Jose Francisco Conceicao Silva (Portugal)

6 Mar 1988 1989 EC Q	Spain	1–3	France	Palma del Río
12:00	Artola 77'	Report	Musset 7', 59'; Loisel 67'	Stadium: El Pandero; Attendance: 5,000; Referee: Tullio Lanese (Italy)

20 Mar 1988 1989 EC Q	Spain	1–0	Bulgaria	Torrent
12:00	Artola 73'	Report		Stadium: Estadio San Gregorio; Referee: René Bindels (Luxembourg)

23 Apr 1988 1989 EC Q	France	0–0	Spain	Castelsarrasin
20:00		Report		Stadium: Stade de Gandalou; Attendance: 1,000; Referee: Michael Caulfield (Republic of Ireland)

14 May 1988 1989 EC Q	Spain	0–2	Czechoslovakia	Figueres
21:00		Report	J. Paoletti-Nováková 52'; A. Nováková 58'	Stadium: Estadi Vilatenim; Attendance: 2,000; Referee: Vitor M. Fernandes Correia (Portugal)

29 Oct 1988 1989 EC Q	Belgium	1–0	Spain	Antwerp
15:00	Verdonck 73'	Report		Stadium: Veltwijckstadion; Referee: Allan Gunn (England)

4 Nov 1989 1991 EC Q	Spain	0–0	Switzerland	Benicàssim
16:00		Report		Stadium: Farcha; Attendance: 2,000; Referee: Claude Bouillet (France)

25 Nov 1989 1991 EC Q	Spain	1–3	Denmark	Antequera
18:00	Bakero 11'	Report https://www.bdfutbol.com/es/c/partido.html?id=346&l=Espa%C3%B1a&v=Dinamarca&d=25%2F11%2F1989	M. González 37'; Hansen 60'; Jensen 77'	Stadium: El Maulí; Referee: Veiga (Portugal)

=== 1990–1999 ===
10 Feb 1990 1991 EC Q	Italy	3–1	Spain	Portici
15:00	Ferraguzzi 32'; Morace 53', 78'	Report	Artola 85'	Stadium: Comunal; Attendance: 8,000; Referee: Beasun (Yugoslavia)

2 May 1990 1991 EC Q	Switzerland	2–1	Spain	Binningen
19:00	Käser 26'; Gubler 44'	Report	Parejo 75'	Stadium: Spiegelfeld; Attendance: 600; Referee: Jean-François Crucke (Belgium)

13 Jun 1990 1991 EC Q	Denmark	5–0	Spain	Vejle
14:30	Jensen 13', 51'; Rotbøl 16'; Gam-Pedersen 74'; Kolding 80'	Report		Stadium: Vejle Stadion; Attendance: 150; Referee: Walter Keith (Wales)

21 Oct 1990 1991 EC Q	Spain	0–0	Italy	Cartagena
18:00		Report		Stadium: Estadio Cartagonova; Referee: Fortunato Azevedo (Portugal)

23 Oct 1991 1993 EC Q	Spain	0–4	Sweden	Palamós
20:00		SvFF Report	Andelén 20'; Videkull 54'; Sundhage 63' (pen.); I. Johansson 66'	Stadium: Nou Estadi; Attendance: 500; Referee: Jorge Coroado (Portugal)

8 Dec 1991 1993 EC Q	Spain	0–1	Republic of Ireland	Lucena
16:00		Report	O'Toole 51'	Stadium: Ciudad de Lucena; Referee: Philippe Leduc (France)

22 Mar 1992 1993 EC Q	Republic of Ireland	0–1	Spain	Dublin
11:00		Report	Bakero 9'	Stadium: Dalymount Park; Referee: Bragi Bergmann (Iceland)

30 Mar 1992 Grand Hotel Varna Tournament	Hungary	1–0	Spain	Varna, Bulgaria
	Kern 61'	Report		Stadium: Grand Hotel Warna Stadium; Attendance: 300; Referee: Dimitar Ivanov Morimov (Bulgaria)

4 Apr 1992 Grand Hotel Varna Tournament	Spain	4–0	Poland	Varna, Bulgaria
	Banqué; B. García; Prieto	Report		Stadium: Grand Hotel Warna Stadium; Referee: Dimitar Ivanov Momirov (Bulgaria)

17 May 1992 1993 EC Q	Sweden	1–1	Spain	Borås
12:00	H. Johansson 22'	SvFF Report	Prieto 25'	Stadium: Ryavallen; Attendance: 454; Referee: Ilkka Koho (Finland)

30 Oct 1993 1995 EC Q	Belgium	0–0	Spain	Brussels
14:30		http://static.belgianfootball.be/project/publiek/rencinter/nl/wed_301.htm KBVB		Stadium: Heysel Stadion; Referee: Hermann Albrecht (Germany)

6 Dec 1993 Torneig Internacional Ciutat de Tarragona	Spain	2–2 (5–6 p)	Poland	Tarragona
16:30	Banqué 51'; R. Castillo 72'	Report	Szondermajer 25'; Ekiel 53'	Stadium: Nou Estadi; Referee: Manuel Medina (Spain)

8 Dec 1993 Torneig Internacional Ciutat de Tarragona	Spain	0–1	Russia	Tarragona
11:00		Report	Kononova 20'	Stadium: Nou Estadi; Referee: Fernando García (Spain)

19 Dec 1993 1995 EC Q	Spain	0–0	England	Osuna
12:00		Report		Stadium: Municipal; Referee: Fortunato Azevedo (Portugal)

5 Feb 1994 Friendly	Portugal	0–1	Spain	Chaves
16:00		Report	Prieto 70'	Stadium: Estadio Municipal; Referee: Fortunato Azevedo (Portugal)

20 Feb 1994 1995 EC Q	England	0–0	Spain	Bradford
13:00		Report		Stadium: Valley Parade; Referee: Bragi Bergmann (Iceland)

20 Mar 1994 1995 EC Q	Spain	17–0	Slovenia	Palamós
17:00	Prieto 23', 35' (pen.), 51', 72', 79', 86', 89'; García 26', 83'; González 37', 43', 59'; R. Castillo 40', 46'; Bakero 54', 68'; Gojkoviv 84' (o.g.)	Report		Stadium: Nou Estadi

24 Apr 1994 1995 EC Q	Spain	4–0	Belgium	Tortosa
12:00	Bakero 18'; Pascual 38', 67'; Deudorede 62' (o.g.)	http://hemeroteca-paginas.mundodeportivo.com/EMD01/HEM/1994/04/26/MD19940426-039.pdf http://static.belgianfootball.be/project/publiek/rencinter/nl/wed_278.htm KBVB		Stadium: Municipal Josep Otero; Referee: Marc Van Geersom (Belgium)

29 May 1994 1995 EC Q	Slovenia	0–8	Spain	Naklo
15:00		Report	Sirgo 12', 48'; Prieto 28', 32'; Bakero 41', 61'; Pascual 58', 67'	Stadium: Arena Zmagovalcev

3 Apr 1995 Grand Hotel Varna Tournament	Hungary	5–3	Spain	Varna, Bulgaria
	Mester 18'; Bajkó 24', 25', 83'; Bárfy 81'	Report	Muruzabal 12'; Salomé 55'; Prieto 59'	Stadium: Grand Hotel Warna Stadium; Referee: Biser Marinchev (Bulgaria)

4 Apr 1995 Grand Hotel Varna Tournament	Russia	0–0	Spain	Varna, Bulgaria
		Report		Stadium: Grand Hotel Warna Stadium

5 Apr 1995 Grand Hotel Varna Tournament	Romania	1–2	Spain	Varna, Bulgaria
	Grigore 40'	Report	Prieto 60', 76' (pen.)

8 Apr 1995 Grand Hotel Varna Tournament	Russia	2–4	Spain	Varna, Bulgaria
	Guntova-Zaika 6'; Kononova 35'	Report	Sirgo 17'; Prieto 43', 62'; C. Martín 78'	Stadium: Grand Hotel Warna Stadium

19 Nov 1995 1997 EC Q	Spain	0–1	Denmark	Pozoblanco
12:00		https://www.dbu.dk/landshold/Landsholdsdatabasen/LBaseMatchInfo.aspx?matchid=1831 DBU	L. Madsen 53'	Stadium: Municipal; Attendance: 3,600; Referee: Regina Belksma-Konink (Netherlands)

31 Mar 1996 1997 EC Q	Spain	5–1	Romania	Castelló de la Plana
12:00	Torras 7'; Prieto 24', 34', 63'; Cano 73'	Report	Simion 37'	Stadium: Nou Castàlia; Attendance: 2,000; Referee: Cristina Gozzi (Italy)

21 Apr 1996 1997 EC Q	Denmark	2–0	Spain	Hjørring
13:00	L. Madsen 47'; Brink 52'	https://www.dbu.dk/landshold/Landsholdsdatabasen/LBaseMatchInfo.aspx?matchid=1837 DBU		Stadium: Hjørring Stadium; Attendance: 710; Referee: Michael Ross (Netherlands)

1 May 1996 1997 EC Q	Romania	2–2	Spain	Câmpina
12:00	Pufulete 48', 75'	Report	Prieto 13'; R. Castillo 63'	Stadium: Stadionul Poiana; Attendance: 1,500; Referee: Galina Doneva (Bulgaria)

12 May 1996 1997 EC Q	Sweden	1–1	Spain	Visby
13:30	Sundhage 21'	SvFF Report	Prieto 73'	Stadium: Gutavallen; Attendance: 1,584; Referee: Katrina Flovirta (Finland)

2 Jun 1996 1997 EC Q	Spain	0–8	Sweden	Gandía
12:00		SvFF Report	Pohjanen 21'; Sundhage 43', 56'; Swedberg 45'; Videkull 66', 90'; Ljungberg 75'; Å. Jakobsson 82'	Stadium: Estadio Guillermo Olagüe; Attendance: 319; Referee: Lale Orte (Turkey)

27 Jun 1996 Women's Tournament Slovakia	Poland	4–0	Spain	Drahovce, Slovakia
		Report		Stadium: Drahovce Štadión

28 Jun 1996 Women's Tournament Slovakia	Slovakia	1–1	Spain	Veľké Kostoľany
			Mateos	Stadium: Futbalový Štadión TJ

2 Jul 1996 Women's Tournament Slovakia	FR Yugoslavia	1–1	Spain	Zeleneč, Slovakia
		Report	Jiménez	Stadium: ŠK Slávia Zeleneč -štadión

8 Sep 1996 1997 EC PO	Spain	2–1	England	Montilla
12:00	Prieto 8', 56'	Report	Powell 64'	Stadium: Estadio Municipal; Referee: Tiziana Calamosca (Italy)

29 Sep 1996 1997 EC PO	England	1–1	Spain	Birkenhead
	Harper 77'	Report	Mateos 41'	Stadium: Prenton Park; Attendance: 4,500; Referee: Bente Folsing (Denmark)

24 Apr 1997 Friendly	Germany	6–0	Spain	Lübeck
18:00	C.Müller 20'; Smisek 30', 55'; Prinz 61', 77'; Fitschen 83'	Report		Stadium: Stadion Lohmühle; Attendance: 3,500; Referee: Jutta Wegerich (Germany)

29 Jun 1997 (Norway) (Sweden) 1997 EC GS	France	1–1	Spain	Karlskoga, Sweden
14:00	Roujas 50'	Report	Parejo 14'	Stadium: Nobelstadion; Attendance: 920; Referee: Vibeke Karlsen-Gabrielsen (Denmark)

2 Jul 1997 (Norway) (Sweden) 1997 EC GS	Sweden	1–0	Spain	Karlskoga
19:00	Corominas 7' (o.g.)	Report		Stadium: Nobelstadion; Attendance: 3,403; Referee: Vibeke Karlsen-Gabrielsen (Norway)

5 Jul 1997 (Norway) (Sweden) 1997 EC GS	Russia	0–1	Spain	Karlskoga, Sweden
16:00		Report	Parejo 67'	Stadium: Nobelstadion; Referee: Regina Belksma-Konink (Netherlands)

9 Jul 1997 (Norway) (Sweden) 1997 EC SF	Italy	2–1	Spain	Lillestrøm, Norway
19:00	Fiorini 11'; Morace 29'	Report	Parejo 89'	Stadium: Åråsen Stadion; Attendance: 7,200; Referee: Christine Frai (Germany)

1 Nov 1997 1999 WC Q	Spain	1–2	Ukraine	Gavà
12:00	Mateos 82'	Report	Zinchenko 40', 45'	Stadium: Estadi La Bòbila; Attendance: 1,200; Referee: Nicole Novidi Bengnat (Switzerland)

3 May 1998 1999 WC Q	Spain	1–2	Sweden	Motril
17:00	Prieto 29'	Report	Sandell 34'; Ljungberg 87'	Stadium: Escribano Castilla; Attendance: 1,000; Referee: Georgios Psychomanis (Greece)

16 May 1998 Friendly	France	3–2	Spain	Rennes
	Pichon 2'; Roujas 18'; Soubeyrand 63'	Report	Parejo 31' (pen.); Prieto 45'	Stadium: La Route de Lorient; Attendance: 850; Referee: Ghislaine Perron-Labbé (France)

24 May 1998 1999 WC Q	Sweden	3–1	Spain	Stockholm
15:00	Törnqvist 19'; Sandell 29'; García 78' (o.g.)	Report	Mateos 33'	Stadium: Söderstadion; Attendance: 3,302; Referee: Sergejs Braga (Latvia)

31 May 1998 1999 WC Q	Spain	0–0	Iceland	Palencia
17:00		Report		Stadium: Estadio La Balastera; Referee: Gerard Perry (Republic of Ireland)

7 Jun 1998 1999 WC Q	Ukraine	2–1	Spain	Kyiv
16:00	Frishko 26'; Perkur 37'	Report	Torras 57'	Stadium: Dynamo Stadium; Referee: Vesselin Bogdanov (Bulgaria)

14 Jun 1998 1999 WC Q	Iceland	1–1	Spain	Kópavogur
12:00	Jónsdóttir 90'	Report	Prieto 7'	Stadium: Kópavogsvöllur; Referee: Charles Schaak (Luxembourg)

13 Sep 1998 1999 WC R	Scotland	0–3	Spain	Stirling
13:00		Report	Jiménez 29'; Mateos 66'; Monforte 75'	Stadium: Forthbank Stadium; Referee: Vanco Kocev (Macedonia)

11 Oct 1998 1999 WC R	Spain	4–1	Scotland	Córdoba
12:00	Gimbert 42'; Monforte 47'; Cabezón 52' (pen.); Marco 87'	Report	Fleeting 38'	Stadium: El Fontanar; Referee: Spiridon Papadakos (Greece)

7 Nov 1999 2001 EC Q	Spain	2–5	Sweden	Plasencia
13:00	Mateos 60'; Rodríguez 72'	Report	Svensson 28'; Ljungberg 44', 69'; Andersson 76', 80'	Stadium: Ciudad Deportiva; Attendance: 3,000; Referee: Claudine Brohet (Belgium)

27 Nov 1999 2001 EC Q	France	1–0	Spain	Martigues
19:00	Diacre 68' (pen.)	Report		Stadium: Stade Francis Turcan; Attendance: 2,967; Referee: Maria Trambusch (Austria)

12 Dec 1999 2001 EC Q	Spain	1–1	Netherlands	Córdoba
12:00	Moreno 75'	Report	Smith 36'	Stadium: El Fontanar; Attendance: 2,000; Referee: Elke Günthner (Germany)

=== 2000–2009 ===
1 Apr 2000 2001 EC Q	Netherlands	1–2	Spain	Almelo
	Kiesel-Griffioen 70'	Report	Gimbert 30'; Fuentes 90+3'	Stadium: Polman Stadion; Attendance: 6,500; Referee: Nicole Mouidi-Petignat (Switzerland)

21 May 2000 2001 EC Q	Spain	1–2	France	Vilagarcía de Arousa
12:00	Mateos 85'	Report	Mugneret-Béghé 43', 82'	Stadium: A Lomba; Attendance: 2,000; Referee: Vibeke Karlsen (Norway)

11 Jun 2000 2001 EC Q	Sweden	7–0	Spain	Karlskoga
16:00	Svensson 23', 49', 58'; Törnqvist 45'; Fagerström 64'; Call 80'; Bengtsson 90'	Report		Stadium: Nobelstadion; Attendance: 1,610; Referee: Anttje Wetteweg (Germany)

22 Oct 2000 2001 EC PO	Spain	1–6	Denmark	Burgos
	Gimbert 26'	Report	Jensen 17'; Krogh 54', 56', 80'; Pedersen 70', 85'	Stadium: Estadio El Plantío; Attendance: 4,300; Referee: Christine Frai (Germany)

21 Nov 2000 2001 EC PO	Denmark	4–2	Spain	Odense
18:00	Krogh 20', 21'; Petersen 50'; Pedersen 56'	Report	Cabezón 3'; Mateos 57'	Stadium: Odense Stadion; Attendance: 621; Referee: Wendy Toms (England)

22 Mar 2001 Friendly	England	4–2	Spain	Luton
19:45	K. Smith 18'; S. Smith 35', 67', 76'	Report	Gurrutxaga 12'; Ferré 62'	Stadium: Kenilworth Road; Attendance: 3,602; Referee: Elke Gunthner (Germany)

30 Sep 2001 2003 WC Q	Spain	6–1	Iceland	Teruel
	Del Río 4', 30'; Auxi 43', 59'; Gimbert 86' (pen.); Ferreira 87'	Report	Ólafsdóttir 63'	Stadium: Estadio Pinilla; Attendance: 500; Referee: Elke Fielenbach (Germany)

28 Oct 2001 2003 WC Q	Russia	2–0	Spain	Selyatino
	Svetlitskaia 11'; Bosikova 85'	Report		Stadium: Stroitel Stadium; Attendance: 1,000; Referee: Bente Ovedie Skogvang (Norway)

28 Nov 2001 2003 WC Q	Italy	3–0	Spain	Città di Castello
14:30	Camporese 7'; Ilaria Pasqui 65'; Zorri 78'	Report		Stadium: Comunale; Referee: Bente Ovedie Skogvangs (Norway)

23 Jan 2002 Friendly	Spain	0–0	Sweden	Murcia
21:00		Report		Stadium: La Condomina; Attendance: 625; Referee: Paloma Quintero (Spain)

24 Mar 2002 2003 WC Q	Spain	0–1	Italy	Pozoblanco
		Report	Guarino 77'	Stadium: Municipal; Attendance: 1,200; Referee: Alexandra Ihringova (Slovakia)

28 Apr 2002 2003 WC Q	Spain	2–1	Russia	Molina de Segura
	Auxi 10'; Del Río 33'	Report	Saenko 62'	Stadium: Sánchez Canovas; Referee: Lale Orta (Turkey)

30 May 2002 2003 WC Q	Iceland	3–0	Spain	Reykjavík
	Helgadóttir 47', 90'; Ólafsdóttir 60'	Report		Stadium: Laugardalsvöllur; Attendance: 2,240; Referee: Claudine Brohet (Belgium)

Sep 2002 2003 WC R	Hungary	cancelled	Spain
		Report

Oct 2002 2003 WC R	Spain	cancelled	Hungary
		Report

26 Mar 2003 2005 EC Q	Netherlands	0–1	Spain	Zwolle
19:30		Report	del Río 72'	Stadium: Oosterenkstadion; Referee: Eva Ödlund (Sweden)

16 Nov 2003 2005 EC Q	Spain	0–2	Norway	Las Rozas de Madrid
12:00		Report	Mellgren 28'; Fosse-Sæthre 83'	Stadium: La Ciudad del Fútbol; Referee: Christine Frai (Germany)

29 Feb 2004 2005 EC Q	Spain	9–1	Belgium	Alginet
12:00	Gurrutxaga 8'; Del Río 15', 23', 50', 86', 89'; M. Castillo 35'; Vázquez 73', 78'	Report	Verelst 6'	Stadium: Estadio La Forana; Referee: Sabina de Nitto (Italy)

21 Mar 2004 2005 EC Q	Spain	0–0	Netherlands	La Roda
12:00		Report		Stadium: Estadio Municipal; Referee: Floarea Ionescu (Romania)

18 Apr 2004 2005 EC Q	Spain	0–1	Denmark	Lucena
16:00		Report	M. Pedersen 30'	Stadium: Estadio Municipal; Attendance: 1,256; Referee: Dagmar Damková (Czech Republic)

2 May 2004 2005 EC Q	Belgium	2–0	Spain	Mons
12:00	Kristel Verelest 15' van Humbeeck 50'	Report		Stadium: Stade Charles Tondreau; Referee: Anri Hänninen (Finland)

22 May 2004 2005 EC Q	Denmark	2–0	Spain	Farum
14:00	Paaske Sørensen 44'; Eggers Nielsen 85'	Report		Stadium: Farum Park; Attendance: 1,117; Referee: Wendy Toms (England)

2 Oct 2004 2005 EC Q	Norway	2–0	Spain	Porsgrunn
15:00	R. Gulbrandsen 71'; Christensen 83'	Report		Stadium: Kjølnes Stadion; Referee: Natalia Avdonchenko (Russia)

15 Feb 2005 Torneo de Maspalomas	Spain	2–2	Finland	San Bartolomé de Tirajana
	Del Rio 25'; Cabezón 45' (pen.)	Report	Talonen 17'; Uusi-Luomalahti 71'	Stadium: Estadio de Maspalomas; Attendance: 200; Referee: Hirahi Hernández (Spain)

16 Feb 2005 Torneo de Maspalomas	Spain	0–0	Netherlands	San Bartolomé de Tirajana
		Report		Stadium: Estadio de Maspalomas; Attendance: 50; Referee: Alexis Pérez (Spain)

29 Sep 2005 2007 WC Q	Poland	3–2	Spain	Kutno
15:00	Rytwinska 49'; Gurrutxaga 53' (o.g.); Pozerska 61'	Report	del Rio 6', 40'	Stadium: City Stadium; Attendance: 1,000; Referee: Christina Beck (Germany)

30 Oct 2005 2007 WC Q	Finland	0–1	Spain	Helsinki
14:00		Report	Cabezón 34'	Stadium: Olympic Stadium; Attendance: 5,892; Referee: Christina Beck (Germany)

5 Nov 2005 2007 WC Q	Spain	3–2	Belgium	Las Rozas de Madrid
12:30	Cabezón 2'; De Cock 90+1' (o.g.); Gimbert 90+2'	Report	Maes 67'; Verelst 81'	Stadium: La Ciudad del Fútbol; Attendance: 300; Referee: Lale Orta (Turkey)

10 Nov 2005 2007 WC Q	Spain	2–2	Denmark	Las Rozas de Madrid
17:00	Vilanova 13'; Martín 31'	Report	Sørensen 18'; Rasmussen 52'	Stadium: La Ciudad del Fútbol; Attendance: 300; Referee: Sarah Girard-Fautrel (France)

30 Mar 2006 2007 WC Q	Spain	7–0	Poland	Aranda de Duero
17:00	Martín 9', 28', 52', 63', 85'; Cabezón 32'; Azagra 54'	Report		Stadium: Estadio El Montecillo; Attendance: 2,000; Referee: Mihaela Basimamović (Croatia)

22 Apr 2006 2007 WC Q	Belgium	2–4	Spain	Brussels
19:00	Maes 64'; Callebaut 75'	Report	Martín 5', 40'; Gurrutxaga 16' del Rio 29'	Stadium: Stade Joseph Marien; Attendance: 650; Referee: Marina Mamayeva (Russia)

27 Apr 2006 2007 WC Q	Denmark	5–0	Spain	Viborg
19:00	M. Pedersen 50'; Pape 62' (pen.), 88'; Sørensen 68'; Rasmussen 75'	Report		Stadium: Viborg Stadion; Attendance: 4,336; Referee: Anna de Toni (Italy)

11 May 2006 2007 WC Q	Spain	0–0	Finland	Pozoblanco
21:00		Report		Stadium: Estadio Municipal; Attendance: 1,100; Referee: Nicole Petignat (Switzerland)

30 May 2007 2009 EC Q	Belarus	0–3	Spain	Babruysk
17:00		Report	Vázquez 52'; Azagra 66'; Jiménez 83'	Stadium: Spartak Stadium; Attendance: 2,250; Referee: Lenna Arweahal (Sweden)

27 Oct 2007 2009 EC Q	Czech Republic	2–2	Spain	Plzeň
14:00	I. Martínková 18'; Kňavová 78'	Report	Martín 35'; Vilanova 90+4'	Stadium: Stadion města Plzně; Attendance: 727; Referee: Florea Cristina Ionescu (Romania)

25 Nov 2007 2009 EC Q	England	1–0	Spain	Shrewsbury
18:00	Carney 64'	Report		Stadium: New Meadow; Attendance: 8,753; Referee: Claudine Brohet (Belgium)

16 Feb 2008 2009 EC Q	Spain	4–0	Northern Ireland	Aranda de Duero
17:00	Del Río 17'; Bermúdez 27'; Vilas 59'; García 74'	Report		Stadium: Estadio El Montecillo; Attendance: 4,500; Referee: Christine Bango (Austria)

3 May 2008 2009 EC Q	Spain	6–1	Belarus	Las Rozas de Madrid
12:00	Vázquez 11', 40'; Romero 28', 90'; Cuesta 68'; Pérez 88'	Report	Shpak 36'	Stadium: La Ciudad del Fútbol; Attendance: 150; Referee: Hilal Tuba Tosun (Turkey)

8 May 2008 2009 EC Q	Spain	4–1	Czech Republic	Las Rozas de Madrid
19:00	Gimbert 46' (pen.); Boquete 57', 90+2' (pen.); Torrejón 84'	Report	Heroldova 33'	Stadium: La Ciudad del Fútbol; Attendance: 150; Referee: Gyöngyi Gaal (Hungary)

28 May 2008 2009 EC Q	Northern Ireland	0–3	Spain	Newry
20:45		Report	Vázquez 9' 11'; Boquete 72'	Stadium: The Showgrounds; Attendance: 452; Referee: Christina Westrum Pedersen (Norway)

2 Oct 2008 2009 EC Q	Spain	2–2	England	Zamora
	Boquete 8'; Bermúdez 42'	Report	Carney 54'; Smith 76'	Stadium: Estadio Ruta de la Plata; Attendance: 1,740; Referee: Jenny Palmqvist (Sweden)

25 Oct 2008 2009 EC PO	Spain	0–2	Netherlands	Las Rozas de Madrid
19:30		Report	Stevens 49'; Van De Ven 84'	Stadium: La Ciudad del Fútbol; Attendance: 300; Referee: Gyöngyi Gaal (Hungary)

30 Oct 2008 2009 EC PO	Netherlands	2–0	Spain	Volendam
20:00	Stevens 37' 56'	Report		Stadium: Kras Stadion; Attendance: 4,257; Referee: Tanja Schett (Austria)

19 Sep 2009 2011 WC Q	Malta	0–13	Spain	Ta' Qali
17:00		Report	Meseguer 6'; Martín 11', 19', 30', 51'; Bermúdez 26', 36', 38'; Romero 31', 68', 90+3'; Boquete 53', 75'	Stadium: Centenary Stadium; Attendance: 200; Referee: Silvia Tea Spinelli (Italy)

24 Oct 2009 2011 WC Q	Spain	2–0	Austria	Córdoba
12:00	Bermúdez 20'; Martín 32'	Report		Stadium: Estadio Nuevo Arcángel; Attendance: 4,000; Referee: Natalia Avdonchenko (Russia)

29 Oct 2009 2011 WC Q	Austria	0–1	Spain	Amstetten
19:00		Report	Martín 49'	Stadium: Ertl Glas Stadion; Attendance: 450; Referee: Bibiana Steinhaus (Germany)

21 Nov 2009 2011 WC Q	Turkey	0–5	Spain	Manisa
14:00		Report	Martín 47', 50' (pen.), 53'; Bermúdez 78'; Boquete 82'	Stadium: Manisa 19 Mayıs Stadium; Attendance: 500; Referee: Aneliya Sinabova (Bulgaria)

=== 2010–2019 ===
1 Apr 2010 2011 WC Q	England	1–0	Spain	London
19:00	Chapman 30'	Report		Stadium: The New Den; Attendance: 5,041; Referee: Christina Westrum Pedersen (Norway)

7 Apr 2010 2011 WC Q	Spain	5–1	Turkey	Guadalajara
19:00	Bermúdez 29'; Martín 31', 70'; Torrejón 36'; Olabarrieta 40'	Report	Elgalp 55'	Stadium: Estadio Pedro Escartín; Attendance: 3,000; Referee: Zuzana Kováčová (Slovakia)

19 Jun 2010 2011 WC Q	Spain	2–2	England	Aranda de Duero
19:15	Martín 16'; Bermúdez 67'	Report	Unitt 78'; F. White 88'	Stadium: Estadio El Montecillo; Attendance: 2,800; Referee: Jenny Palmqvist (Sweden)

24 Jun 2010 2011 WC Q	Spain	9–0	Malta	Segovia
20:30	Martín 17', 47', 61', 72'; Ibarra 49', 80'; Casado 77'; Pace 86' (o.g.); Boquete 90'	Report		Stadium: La Albuera; Attendance: 1,000; Referee: Knarik Grigoryan (Armenia)

17 Sep 2011 2013 EC Q	Turkey	1–10	Spain	Istanbul
18:00	Güngör 20'	Report	Adriana 9', 51'; Borja 11', 65'; Boquete 26', 46', 69'; Sonia 44'; Corredera 82'; Olabarrieta 86'	Stadium: Recep Tayyip Erdoğan Stadium; Attendance: 442; Referee: Tanja Schett (Austria)

23 Oct 2011 2013 EC Q	Spain	3–2	Switzerland	Las Rozas de Madrid
12:00	Adriana 19' (pen.), 36'; Boquete 71'	Report	Bachmann 58'; Mehmeti 69'	Stadium: La Ciudad del Fútbol; Attendance: 350; Referee: Jenny Palmqvist (Sweden)

27 Oct 2011 2013 EC Q	Kazakhstan	0–4	Spain	Shymkent
11:00		Report	Sonia 19', 82'; Adriana 50' (pen.); Meseguer 86'	Stadium: BIIK Stadium; Attendance: 80; Referee: Mihaela Basimamović (Croatia)

20 Nov 2011 2013 EC Q	Romania	0–4	Spain	Buftea
15:00		Report	Sonia 42'; Boquete 52', 73'; Adriana 84'	Stadium: Stadionul Buftea; Attendance: 106; Referee: Gyöngyi Gaál (Hungary)

24 Nov 2011 2013 EC Q	Spain	2–2	Germany	Motril
20:30	Boquete 57'; Willy 90+1'	Report	Goeßling 27'; García 30' (o.g.)	Stadium: Estadio Escribano Castilla; Attendance: 2,600; Referee: Kateryna Monzul (Ukraine)

15 Feb 2012 Friendly	Spain	4–1	Austria	Santiago de Compostela
20:00	Bermúdez 61'; Putellas 64'; Borja 69'; Willy 90'	Report	Manhart 4'	Stadium: San Lázaro; Attendance: 1,000; Referee: Gil Gozalo (Spain)

31 Mar 2012 2013 EC Q	Germany	5–0	Spain	Mannheim
16:00	da Mbabi 24', 58', 68', 86'; Popp 61'	Report		Stadium: Carl-Benz-Stadion; Attendance: 11,617; Referee: Efthalia Mitsi (Greece)

5 Apr 2012 2013 EC Q	Spain	13–0	Kazakhstan	Las Rozas de Madrid
12:00	Boquete 20' (pen.), 68' (pen.); Bermúdez 22'; Borja 29', 54'; Vilas 33', 38', 45', 51', 59', 60', 79'; Torrejón 78'	Report		Stadium: La Ciudad del Fútbol; Attendance: 250; Referee: Lilach Asulin (Israel)

16 Jun 2012 2013 EC Q	Switzerland	4–3	Spain	Aarau
18:30	Bachmann 18', 80'; Crnogorčević 54'; Zumbühl 82'	Report	Vilas 25'; García 37'; Boquete 73' (pen.)	Stadium: Stadion Brügglifeld; Attendance: 760; Referee: Kirsi Heikkinen (Finland)

21 Jun 2012 2013 EC Q	Spain	4–0	Turkey	Las Rozas de Madrid
11:30	Sonia 13'; Vilas 32' 34'; Kıraç 73' (o.g.)	Report		Stadium: La Ciudad del Fútbol; Attendance: 100; Referee: Rhona Daly (Republic of Ireland)

19 Sep 2012 2013 EC Q	Spain	0–0	Romania	Las Rozas de Madrid
18:00		Report		Stadium: La Ciudad del Fútbol; Attendance: 298; Referee: Anastasia Pustovoitova (Russia)

20 Oct 2012 2013 EC PO	Scotland	1–1	Spain	Glasgow
15:00	Little 26' (pen.)	Report	Adriana 30'	Stadium: Hampden Park; Attendance: 4,058; Referee: Esther Staubli (Switzerland)

24 Oct 2012 2013 EC PO	Spain	3–2 (a.e.t.)	Scotland	Las Rozas de Madrid
18:00	Adriana 74'; Meseguer 113'; Boquete 120+2'	Report	Mitchell 62'; Little 98'	Stadium: La Ciudad del Fútbol; Attendance: 688; Referee: Bibiana Steinhaus (Germany)

16 Jan 2013 Friendly	Spain	2–1	Russia	San Pedro del Pinatar
16:30	Boquete 14'; Hermoso 90+2'	Report	Morozova 35'	Stadium: Pinatar Arena; Attendance: 250; Referee: José María Sánchez Martínez (Spain)

12 Feb 2013 Friendly	Spain	0–0	Denmark	Las Rozas de Madrid
18:00		Report		Stadium: La Ciudad del Fútbol; Attendance: 495; Referee: Marta Frías (Spain)

28 Jun 2013 Friendly	Denmark	2–2	Spain	Vejle
	Gajhede 48'; Rasmussen 58' (pen.)	Report	Boquete 24', 63'	Stadium: Vejle Stadion; Attendance: 783; Referee: Kristina Husballe (Denmark)

12 Jul 2013 (Sweden) 2013 EC GS	England	2–3	Spain	Linköping, Sweden
20:30	Aluko 8'; Bassett 89'	Report	Boquete 4'; Hermoso 85'; Putellas 90+3'	Stadium: Arena Linköping; Attendance: 5,190; Referee: Kateryna Monzul (Ukraine)

15 Jul 2013 (Sweden) 2013 EC GS	Spain	0–1	France	Norrköping, Sweden
20:30		Report	Renard 5'	Stadium: Nya Parken; Attendance: 5,068; Referee: Carina Vitulano (Italy)

18 Jul 2013 (Sweden) 2013 EC GS	Russia	1–1	Spain	Norrköping, Sweden
20:30	Terekhova 44'	Report	Boquete 14'	Stadium: Nya Parken; Attendance: 2,157; Referee: Jenny Palmqvist (Sweden)

22 Jul 2013 (Sweden) 2013 EC QF	Norway	3–1	Spain	Kalmar, Sweden
18:00	Gulbrandsen 24'; Paredes 43' (o.g.); Hegerberg 64'	Report	Hermoso 90+3'	Stadium: Guldfågeln Arena; Attendance: 10,435; Referee: Bibiana Steinhaus (Germany)

27 Oct 2013 2015 WC Q	Spain	6–0	Estonia	Collado Villalba
12:00	Bermúdez 14', 58' (pen.); Torrejón 28'; Hermoso 45'; Natalia Pablos 72'; Paredes 81'	Report		Stadium: Ciudad Deportiva; Attendance: 1,000; Referee: Sofia Karagiorgi (Cyprus)

31 Oct 2013 2015 WC Q	Spain	2–0	Italy	San Sebastián de los Reyes
20:00	Bermúdez 37'; Natalia 56'	Report		Stadium: Nuevo Matapiñonera; Attendance: 1,600; Referee: Katerina Monzul (Ukraine)

23 Nov 2013 2015 WC Q	Spain	1–0	Romania	Aranjuez
12:00	García 40'	Report		Stadium: El Deleite; Attendance: 1,566; Referee: Katalin Kulcsár (Hungary)

27 Nov 2013 2015 WC Q	Spain	3–2	Czech Republic	Fuenlabrada
	Bermúdez 15', 45+1'; Corredera 78'	Report	I. Martínková 80'; Voňková 82'	Stadium: Fernando Torres; Attendance: 834; Referee: Paula Brady (Republic of Ireland)

14 Jan 2014 Friendly	Spain	1–2	Norway	Cartagena
12:00	Boquete 5'	Report	Bjånesøy 50'; Hegerberg 90+1'	Stadium: La Manga Club; Attendance: 100; Referee: Elia María Martínez (Spain)

13 Feb 2014 2015 WC Q	Spain	12–0	Macedonia	Logroño
18:45	Boquete 4', 72'; Bermúdez 11', 46'; Hermoso 26', 70'; Vicky 44'; Natalia 59', 64', 83', 90+3', 90+4'	Report		Stadium: Las Gaunas; Attendance: 5,000; Referee: Eszter Urban (Hungary)

5 Apr 2014 2015 WC Q	Italy	0–0	Spain	Vicenza
15:30		Report		Stadium: Stadio Romeo Menti; Attendance: 5,400; Referee: Esther Staubli (Switzerland)

10 Apr 2014 2015 WC Q	Macedonia	0–10	Spain	Skopje
14:00		Report	Bermúdez 29', 30', 59'; Torrejón 33'; Pablos 45'; Hermoso 45+1', 65', 73'; Calderón 62', 64'	Stadium: FFM Training Centre; Attendance: 200; Referee: Kateryna Zora (Ukraine)

8 May 2014 2015 WC Q	Estonia	0–5	Spain	Tallinn
17:00		Report	Losada 21', 59'; Pablos 32', 35'; Hermoso 63'	Stadium: A. Le Coq Arena; Attendance: 896; Referee: Amy Rayner (England)

13 Sep 2014 2015 WC Q	Romania	0–2	Spain	Iași
16:00		Report	Pablos 28', 59'	Stadium: Stadionul Emil Alexandrescu; Attendance: 350; Referee: Linn Andersson (Sweden)

17 Sep 2014 2015 WC Q	Czech Republic	0–1	Spain	Písek
16:00		Report	Boquete 90+1'	Stadium: Spartak Písek; Attendance: 465; Referee: Stéphanie Frappart (France)

10 Feb 2015 Friendly	Spain	2–2	Austria	San Pedro del Pinatar
12:00	Putellas 7'; Borja 52'	Report	Burger 36'; Maierhofer 64'	Stadium: Pinatar Arena; Referee: Marta Frías (Spain)

11 Feb 2015 Friendly	Spain	2–1	Belgium	San Pedro del Pinatar
18:00	Torrejón 43'; Bermúdez 67'	Report	Wullaert 7'	Stadium: Pinatar Arena; Referee: Beatriz Gil (Spain)

3 Mar 2015 Friendly	Spain	2–2	New Zealand	La Roda
19:00	Boquete 20'; Bermúdez 52'	Report	Wilkinson 63'; Hearn 82'	Stadium: Municipal; Referee: Carlos del Cerro (Spain)

5 Mar 2015 Friendly	Spain	0–0	New Zealand	Guadalajara
20:00		Report		Stadium: Pedro Escartín; Referee: Antonio Mateu (Spain)

8 Apr 2015 Friendly	Spain	1–0	Republic of Ireland	Gijón
18:00	Hermoso 47'	Report		Stadium: Pepe Ortiz; Attendance: 2,000; Referee: Beatriz Gil (Spain)

9 Jun 2015 (Canada) 2015 WC GS	Spain	1–1	Costa Rica	Montreal, Canada
16:00	Vicky 13'	Report	Rodríguez Cedeño 14'	Stadium: Olympic Stadium; Attendance: 10,175; Referee: Salomé di Iorio (Argentina)

13 Jun 2015 (Canada) 2015 WC GS	Brazil	1–0	Spain	Montreal, Canada
16:00	Alves 44'	Report		Stadium: Olympic Stadium; Attendance: 28,623; Referee: Carol Chenard (Canada)

17 Jun 2015 (Canada) 2015 WC GS	South Korea	2–1	Spain	Ottawa, Canada
19:00	Cho 53'; Kim 78'	Report	Boquete 29'	Stadium: Lansdowne Park; Attendance: 21,562; Referee: Anna-Marie Keighley (New Zealand)

18 Sep 2015 Friendly	China	1–3	Spain	Weinan
19:35	Yang Li 49'	Report	Ruth 43'; Sampedro 59'; Meseguer 79'	Stadium: Sports Center; Attendance: 22,173; Referee: Fan Qi (China)

21 Sep 2015 Friendly	China	1–2	Spain	Chenzhou
19:35	Xu Yanlu 7'	Report	Sampedro 45+1'; Natalia 90+4'	Stadium: Sports Center; Referee: Shi Zhenlu (China)

27 Oct 2015 2017 EC Q	Finland	1–2	Spain	Helsinki
17:00	Kuikka 25'	Report	Putellas 4'; Torrecilla 29'	Stadium: Sonera Stadium; Attendance: 3,000; Referee: Teodora Albon (Romania)

26 Nov 2015 2017 EC Q	Republic of Ireland	0–3	Spain	Dublin
14:00		Report	Losada 30'; Hermoso 44' (pen.); Perry 90+3' (o.g.)	Stadium: Tallaght Stadium; Attendance: 2,763; Referee: Stéphanie Frappart (France)

1 Dec 2015 2017 EC Q	Spain	2–0	Portugal	Badajoz
20:00	Losada 8'; Bermúdez 25'	Report		Stadium: Nuevo Vivero; Attendance: 5,750; Referee: Simona Ghisletta (Switzerland)

24 Jan 2016 2017 EC Q	Montenegro	0–7	Spain	Petrovac na moru
13:00		ReportReport	Losada 15', 62'; Boquete 22'; Putellas 42' (pen.); Hermoso 69'; Sampedro 74'; Virginia Torrecilla 77'	Stadium: Stadion pod Malim Brdom; Attendance: 100; Referee: Lorraine Clark (Scotland)

4 Mar 2016 Friendly	Romania	0–0	Spain	Mogoșoaia
16:00		Report		Stadium: Stadionul Mogoșoaia; Referee: Iuliana Demetrescu (Romania)

8 Mar 2016 Friendly	Scotland	1–1	Spain	Falkirk
19:00	Mitchell 55'		Torrecilla 90+3'	Stadium: Falkirk Stadium; Attendance: 1,867; Referee: Morag Pirie (Scotland)

8 Apr 2016 2017 EC Q	Portugal	1–4	Spain	Covilhã
18:00	Do. Silva 66'	Report	Torrecilla 36'; Putellas 40'; Sampedro 87'; Boquete 89'	Stadium: Complexo Desportivo da Covilhã; Attendance: 1,820; Referee: Jana Adámková (Czech Republic)

12 Apr 2016 2017 EC Q	Spain	3–0	Republic of Ireland	Las Rozas de Madrid
18:00	Boquete 58', 65'; Hermoso 86'	Report		Stadium: La Ciudad del Fútbol; Attendance: 1,500; Referee: Linn Andersson (Sweden)

15 Sep 2016 2017 EC Q	Spain	13–0	Montenegro	Las Rozas de Madrid
19:00	Boquete 2', 7', 45', 46'; Bermúdez 10', 20', 23', 52', 90+3'; Sampedro 16'; Corredera 25'; Losada 74'; Putellas 80'	Report		Stadium: La Ciudad del Fútbol; Attendance: 520; Referee: Zuzana Valentová (Slovakia)

20 Sep 2016 2017 EC Q	Spain	5–0	Finland	Leganés
19:00	Torrejón 28'; Paredes 66' (pen.), 82'; Sampedro 88' (pen.); Hermoso 90+1'	Report		Stadium: Butarque; Attendance: 5,100; Referee: Monika Mularczyk (Poland)

25 Oct 2016 Friendly	Spain	1–2	England	Guadalajara
18:00	Torrejón 19'	Report	Torrejón 14' (o.g.); Houghton 17'	Stadium: Pedro Escartín; Attendance: 3,000; Referee: Elia María Martínez (Spain)

26 Nov 2016 Friendly	France	1–0	Spain	Le Mans
21:00	Le Sommer 54'	Report		Stadium: MMArena; Attendance: 11,521; Referee: Gyöngyi Gaal (Hungary)

1 Mar 2017 2017 Algarve Cup	Japan	1–2	Spain	Parchal, Portugal
14:45	Yokoyama 81'	Report	Meseguer 59'; O. García 72'	Stadium: Bela Vista Municipal Stadium; Referee: Edina Alves Batista (Brazil)

3 Mar 2017 2017 Algarve Cup	Spain	3–0	Norway	Faro/Loulé, Portugal
18:30	Thorisdottir 25' (o.g.); Hermoso 39'; O. García 42'	Report		Stadium: Estádio Algarve; Referee: Laura Fortunato (Argentina)

6 Mar 2017 2017 Algarve Cup	Iceland	0–0	Spain	Vila Real de Santo António, Portugal
14:45		Report		Stadium: VRSA Sports Complex; Referee: Mukansanga Salima (Rwanda)

8 Mar 2017 2017 Algarve Cup	Spain	1–0	Canada	Faro/Loulé, Portugal
18:30	Ouahabi 4'	Report		Stadium: Estádio Algarve; Referee: Yoshimi Yamashita (Japan)

8 Apr 2017 Friendly	Belgium	1–4	Spain	Eupen
15:00	Cayman 71'	Report	Losada 34'; Vilas 42'; Hermoso 75' (pen.), 79'	Stadium: Kehrwegstadion; Referee: Solen Dallongeville (France)

10 Jun 2017 Friendly	Spain	1–2	Brazil	Fuenlabrada
18:30	Losada 21' (pen.)	Report	Darlene 77'; Rafaelle 89'	Stadium: Fernando Torres; Attendance: 2,253; Referee: Sandra Braz (Portugal)

30 Jun 2017 Friendly	Spain	7–0	Belgium	San Pedro del Pinatar
18:30	Putellas 5', 44'; Losada 31'; Caldentey 56'; Sampedro 80'; O. García 83'; Vilas 89'	Report		Stadium: Pinatar Arena; Referee: María Dolores Martínez (Spain)

19 Jul 2017 (Netherlands) 2017 EC GS	Spain	2–0	Portugal	Doetinchem, Netherlands
18:00	Losada 23'; Sampedro 42'	Report		Stadium: De Vijverberg; Attendance: 3,188; Referee: Pernilla Larsson (Sweden)

23 Jul 2017 (Netherlands) 2017 EC GS	England	2–0	Spain	Breda, Netherlands
20:45	Kirby 2'; Taylor 85'	Report		Stadium: Rat Verlegh Stadion; Attendance: 4,879; Referee: Carina Vitulano (Italy)

27 Jul 2017 (Netherlands) 2017 EC GS	Scotland	1–0	Spain	Deventer, Netherlands
20:45	Weir 42'	Report		Stadium: De Adelaarshorst; Attendance: 4,840; Referee: Jana Adámková (Czech Republic)

30 Jul 2017 (Netherlands) 2017 EC QF	Austria	0–0 (a.e.t.) (5–3 p)	Spain	Tilburg, Netherlands
18:00		Report		Stadium: Koning Willem II Stadion; Attendance: 3,488; Referee: Stéphanie Frappart (France)
	Penalties
	Feiersinger (penalty scored); Burger (penalty scored); Aschauer (penalty scored); Pinther (penalty scored); Puntigam (penalty scored)		(penalty scored) García; (penalty scored) Sampedro; (penalty missed) Meseguer; (penalty scored) Corredera

18 Sep 2017 Friendly	France	3–1	Spain	Calais
21:00	Georges 21'; Le Sommer 39'; Sarr 72'	Report	58' Caldentey	Stadium: Stade de l'Épopée; Attendance: 6,478; Referee: Esther Staubli (Switzerland)

23 Oct 2017 2019 WC Q	Israel	0–6	Spain	Ramat Gan
17:00		Report	37', 57' Paredes; 43', 84' Hermoso; 73' Latorre; 90+1' Sampedro	Stadium: Ramat Gan Stadium; Attendance: 210; Referee: Zuzana Kováčová (Slovakia)

24 Nov 2017 2019 WC Q	Serbia	1–2	Spain	Belgrade
16:30	Damjanović 78'	Report	Hermoso 13'; Guijarro 90+1'	Stadium: Voždovac Stadium; Attendance: 200; Referee: Marte Sørø (Norway)

28 Nov 2017 2019 WC Q	Spain	4–0	Austria	Palma
20:15	Putellas 3'; Guijarro 16'; Paredes 43'; Torrecilla 57'	Report		Stadium: Estadi de Son Moix; Attendance: 2,371; Referee: Kateryna Monzul (Ukraine)

20 Jan 2018 Friendly	Spain	2–0	Netherlands	San Pedro del Pinatar
19:00	Putellas 66'; Gili 90+4'	Report		Stadium: Pinatar Arena; Referee: Marta Frías (Spain)

28 Feb 2018 2018 Cyprus Cup	Austria	0–2	Spain	Larnaca, Cyprus
18:00		Report	O. García 35'; Vilas 78'	Stadium: GSZ Stadium; Referee: Petra Pavlikova (Slovakia)

2 Mar 2018 2018 Cyprus Cup	Spain	0–0	Belgium	Larnaca, Cyprus
18:00		Report		Stadium: AEK Arena - Georgios Karapatakis; Referee: Florence Guillemin (France)

5 Mar 2018 2018 Cyprus Cup	Spain	2–0	Czech Republic	Larnaca, Cyprus
18:00	Paredes 73'; Putellas 90+3'	Report		Stadium: AEK Arena - Georgios Karapatakis; Referee: Lina Lehtovaara (Finland)

7 Mar 2018 2018 Cyprus Cup	Italy	0–2	Spain	Larnaca, Cyprus
18:00		ReportReport	Sampedro 50'; Guijarro 84'	Stadium: AEK Arena - Georgios Karapatakis; Referee: Lina Lehtovaara (Finland)

6 Apr 2018 2019 WC Q	Finland	0–2	Spain	Helsinki
18:05		Report	Paredes 11'; O. García 50'	Stadium: Telia 5G -areena Attendance: 3,331; Referee: Florence Guillemin (France)

10 Apr 2018 2019 WC Q	Austria	0–1	Spain	Maria Enzersdorf
20:30		Report	Hermoso 58'	Stadium: Bundesstadion Südstadt; Attendance: 2,950; Referee: Anastasia Pustovoitova (Russia)

7 Jun 2018 2019 WC Q	Spain	2–0	Israel	Murcia
20:30	Vilas 51'; Putellas 88' (pen.)	Report		Stadium: La Condomina; Attendance: 3,368; Referee: Iuliana Demetrescu (Romania)

31 Aug 2018 2019 WC Q	Spain	5–1	Finland	Santander
19:00	Corredera 28', 45'; Hermoso 38'; Meriluoto 65' (o.g.); Nahikari 68'	Report	33' Sällström	Stadium: El Sardinero; Attendance: 7,593; Referee: Désirée Grundbacher (Switzerland)

4 Sep 2018 2019 WC Q	Spain	3–0	Serbia	Logroño
20:30	Hermoso 3' (pen.), 75'; Sampedro 35'	Report		Stadium: Las Gaunas; Attendance: 7,727; Referee: Vesna Budimir (Croatia)

8 Nov 2018 Friendly	Spain	3–1	Poland	Leganés
19:00	Falcón 5'; Putellas 58'; Carro 79'	Report	Pajor 39'	Stadium: Butarque; Attendance: 3,491; Referee: María Dolores Martínez (Spain)

13 Nov 2018 Friendly	Germany	0–0	Spain	Erfurt
16:00				Stadium: Steigerwaldstadion; Attendance: 3,169; Referee: Tess Olofsson (Sweden)

17 Jan 2019 Friendly	Spain	1–1	Belgium	Cartagena
19:00	Redondo 64'	Report	Cayman 88'	Stadium: Estadio Cartagonova; Attendance: 3,300; Referee: Sandra Braz (Portugal)

22 Jan 2019 Friendly	Spain	0–1	United States	Alicante
20:35		Report Report	Press 54'	Stadium: José Rico Pérez; Attendance: 9,182; Referee: Stéphanie Frappart (France)

27 Feb 2019 2019 Algarve Cup	Spain	2–0	Netherlands	Parchal, Portugal
17:15	Hermoso 20', 62'	Report		Stadium: Bela Vista Municipal Stadium; Referee: Marie-Soleil Beaudoin (Canada)

1 Mar 2019 2019 Algarve Cup	Poland	3–0	Spain	Lagos, Portugal
16:45	Dudek 26'; Balcerzak 35'; Pajor 50'	Report		Stadium: Lagos Municipal Stadium; Referee: Lucila Venegas (Mexico)

6 Mar 2019 2019 Algarve Cup	Switzerland	0–2	Spain	Albufeira, Portugal
13:15		Report	Hermoso 21'; Müller 63' (o.g.)	Stadium: Albufeira Municipal Stadium; Referee: María Belén Carvajal (Chile)

5 Apr 2019 Friendly	Spain	2–1	Brazil	Don Benito
18:30	Putellas 63'; Torrecilla 68'	Report	Marta 21'	Stadium: Estadio Vicente Sanz; Attendance: 4,800; Referee: Zulema González (Spain)

9 Apr 2019 Friendly	England	2–1	Spain	Swindon
19:00	Mead 36'; White 46'	Report	Bonmatí 67'	Stadium: County Ground; Attendance: 11,000; Referee: Stephanie Frappart (France)

17 May 2019 Friendly	Spain	4–0	Cameroon	Guadalajara
18:45	Guerrero 31'; Redondo 54'; Hernández 76'; Aleixandri 87'	Report		Stadium: Pedro Escartín; Attendance: 1,600; Referee: Marta Huerta de Aza (Spain)

24 May 2019 Friendly	Spain	0–0	Canada	Logroño
19:00		Report		Stadium: Las Gaunas; Attendance: 4,389; Referee: Lizzy van der Helm (Netherlands)

2 Jun 2019 Friendly	Japan	1–1	Spain	Le Touquet, France
13:50	Sugasawa 85'	Report	Hermoso 31' (pen.)	Stadium: Stade Gérard Houllier; Referee: Mehdi Mokhtari (France)

8 Jun 2019 (France) 2019 WC GS	Spain	3–1	South Africa	Le Havre, France
18:00	Hermoso 70' (pen.), 82' (pen.); L. García 89'	Report	Kgatlana 25'	Stadium: Stade Océane; Attendance: 12,044; Referee: María Carvajal (Chile)

12 Jun 2019 (France) 2019 WC GS	Germany	1–0	Spain	Valenciennes, France
18:00	Däbritz 42'	Report		Stadium: Stade du Hainaut; Attendance: 20,761; Referee: Kateryna Monzul (Ukraine)

17 Jun 2019 (France) 2019 WC GS	China	0–0	Spain	Le Havre, France
18:00		Report		Stadium: Stade Océane; Attendance: 11,814; Referee: Edina Alves Batista (Brazil)

24 Jun 2019 (France) 2019 WC R16	Spain	1–2	United States	Reims, France
18:00	Hermoso 9'	Report	Rapinoe 7' (pen.), 76' (pen.)	Stadium: Stade Auguste-Delaune; Attendance: 19,633; Referee: Katalin Kulcsár (Hungary)

31 Aug 2019 Friendly	France	2–0	Spain	Clermont-Ferrand
21:00	Le Sommer 27'; Cascarino 76'	Report		Stadium: Stade Gabriel Montpied; Attendance: 11,980; Referee: Rebecca Welch (England)

4 Oct 2019 2022 EC Q	Spain	4–0	Azerbaijan	A Coruña
21:30	Guijarro 8'; Torrecilla 26'; Bonmatí 54', 76'	Report		Stadium: Estadio Riazor; Attendance: 10,444; Referee: Paula Brady (Republic of Ireland)

8 Oct 2019 2022 EC Q	Czech Republic	1–5	Spain	Prague
19:00	Voňková 89'	Report	Sedláčková 7' (o.g.); Caldentey 11'; Bonmatí 23'; Paredes 35'; Hermoso 79'	Stadium: Ďolíček; Attendance: 1,895; Referee: Tess Olofsson (Sweden)

12 Nov 2019 2022 EC Q	Poland	0–0	Spain	Lublin
18:00		Report		Stadium: Arena Lublin; Attendance: 7,528; Referee: Frida Nielsen (Denmark)

=== 2020–present ===
5 Mar 2020 2020 SheBelieves Cup	Spain	3–1	Japan	Orlando, United States
16:15 ET	Putellas 8'; L. García 48', 78'	Report	Iwabuchi 44'	Stadium: Exploria Stadium; Attendance: 7,528; Referee: Katja Koroleva (United States)

8 Mar 2020 2020 SheBelieves Cup	United States	1–0	Spain	Harrison
17:00	Ertz 87'	Report		Stadium: Red Bull Arena; Attendance: 26,500; Referee: Katia García (Mexico)

11 Mar 2020 2020 SheBelieves Cup	England	0–1	Spain	Frisco, United States
16:15		Report	Putellas 83'	Stadium: Toyota Stadium; Attendance: 10,507; Referee: Danielle Chesky (United States)

19 Sep 2020 2022 EC Q	Moldova	0–9	Spain	Chișinău
19:00		Report	L. García 6', 38'; Sivolobova 9' (o.g.); Caldentey 27', 52', 81' (pen.); Hermoso 35'; Redondo 40'; Guijarro 75'	Stadium: Zimbru Stadium; Attendance: 0 Referee: Jelena Pejković (Croatia)

23 Oct 2020 2022 EC Q	Spain	4–0	Czech Republic	Seville
21:00	González 1'; Guijarro 25'; Bonmatí 34'; Putellas 53'	Report		Stadium: La Cartuja; Attendance: 432; Referee: Sara Persson (Sweden)

27 Nov 2020 2022 EC Q	Spain	10–0	Moldova	Las Rozas de Madrid
21:00	Bonmatí 7', 30'; Hermoso 13', 25', 87' (pen.); Caldentey 28' (pen.); Prisăcari 45+2' (o.g.); Putellas 57'; Guijarro 71'; Navarro 84'	Report		Stadium: La Ciudad del Fútbol; Attendance: 0 Referee: Shona Shukrula (Netherlands)

18 Feb 2021 2022 EC Q	Azerbaijan	0–13	Spain	Baku
18:00		Report	González 21', 24', 20', 31', 87'; Hermoso 33', 43', 67', 82', 90+3'; Caldentey 57'; Navarro 75'; Eizagirre 84'	Stadium: ASK Arena; Attendance: 0 Referee: Maria Marotta (Italy)

23 Feb 2021 2022 EC Q	Spain	3–0	Poland	Las Rozas de Madrid
19:00	González 24', 69'; León 87'	Report		Stadium: La Ciudad del Fútbol; Attendance: 0 Referee: Anastasia Pustovoitova (Russia)

9 Apr 2021 Friendly	Spain	1–0	Netherlands	Marbella
19:00	Guijarro 31'	Report		Stadium: Antonio Lorenzo Cuevas; Referee: Sandra Braz (Portugal)

13 Apr 2021 Friendly	Spain	3–0	Mexico	Marbella
19:00	Cardona 66'; Nahikari 76', 89'	Report		Stadium: Antonio Lorenzo Cuevas; Referee: Iuliana Demetrescu (Romania)

10 Jun 2021 Friendly	Spain	3–0	Belgium	Alcorcón
20:00	Caldentey 42'; Putellas 49'; Bonmatí 73'	Report		Stadium: Estadio de Santo Domingo; Attendance: 500; Referee: Shona Shukrula (Netherlands)

15 Jun 2021 Friendly	Spain	3–0	Denmark	Alcorcón
19:30	Bonmatí 45', 84'; Guijarro 67'	Report		Stadium: Estadio de Santo Domingo; Attendance: 500; Referee: Karoline Wacker (Germany)

16 Sep 2021 2023 WC Q	Faroe Islands	0–10	Spain	Tórshavn
18:00		Report	Sarriegi 7', 32', 55', 60'; Guerrero 8'; Putellas 50'; L. García 58'; Guijarro 64'; Caldentey 70'; Alexaindri 90+5'	Stadium: Tórsvøllur; Attendance: 1,066; Referee: Paula Brady (Republic of Ireland)

21 Sep 2021 2023 WC Q	Hungary	0–7	Spain	Budapest
20:00		Report	González 8', 21'; Caldentey 23', 90+3'; del Castillo 50'; Sarriegi 79', 86'	Stadium: Hidegkuti Nándor Stadion; Attendance: 510; Referee: Sabina Bolić (Croatia)

21 Oct 2021 Friendly	Spain	3–0	Morocco	Cáceres
20:00	del Castillo 28', 68' Sarriegi 60'	Report		Stadium: Estadio Príncipe Felipe; Attendance: 2,044; Referee: Merima Čelik (Bosnia and Herzegovina)

26 Oct 2021 2023 WC Q	Ukraine	0–6	Spain	Kovalivka
17:00		Report	Putellas 9'; Sarriegi 33', 82'; Eizagirre 68'; Apanashchenko 84' (o.g.); Redondo 90+2'	Stadium: Kolos Stadium; Attendance: 990; Referee: Galiya Echeva (Bulgaria)

25 Nov 2021 2023 WC Q	Spain	12–0	Faroe Islands	Seville
21:00	González 2', 41', 51', 74'; Bonmatí 17', 50'; Redondo 25'; Caldentey 39' (pen.), 52', 57'; Putellas 83'; Sarriegi 89'	Report		Stadium: La Cartuja; Attendance: 774; Referee: Triinu Laos (Estonia)

30 Nov 2021 2023 WC Q	Spain	8–0	Scotland	Seville
21:00	Sarriegi 20', 58'; Caldentey 33', 83'; Bonmatí 41', 61'; Putellas 64'; Hermoso 80'	Report		Stadium: La Cartuja; Attendance: 1,641; Referee: Lina Lehtovaara (Finland)

17 Feb 2022 2022 Arnold Clark Cup	Germany	1–1	Spain	Middlesbrough, United Kingdom
14:30	Schüller 88'	Report	Putellas 46'	Stadium: Riverside Stadium; Attendance: 249; Referee: Tess Oloffson (Sweden)

20 Feb 2022 2022 Arnold Clark Cup	England	0–0	Spain	Norwich
14:30		Report		Stadium: Carrow Road; Attendance: 14,284; Referee: Mihaela Tepusa (Romania)

23 Feb 2022 2022 Arnold Clark Cup	Canada	0–1	Spain	Wolverhampton, United Kingdom
14:30		Report	Putellas 21'	Stadium: Molineux Stadium; Attendance: 877; Referee: Cheryl Foster (Wales)

7 Apr 2022 Friendly	Spain	1–1	Brazil	Alicante
20:00	Putellas 8'		Geyse 39'	Stadium: Estadio José Rico Pérez; Attendance: 8,833; Referee: Rebecca Welch (England)

12 Apr 2022 2023 WC Q	Scotland	0–2	Spain	Glasgow
19:35		Report	Hermoso 14' (pen.), 78'	Stadium: Hampden Park; Attendance: 7,804; Referee: Esther Staubli (Switzerland)

25 Jun 2022 Friendly	Spain	7–0	Australia	Huelva
21:30	Bonmatí 44'; Caldentey 48'; E. González 53'; L. García 57', 81'; Guerrero 89', 90+1'	Report		Stadium: Nuevo Colombino; Attendance: 6,869; Referee: Monika Mularczyk (Poland)

1 Jul 2022 Friendly	Italy	1–1	Spain	Castel di Sangro
17:00	Bergamaschi 48'	Report	Putellas 67'	Stadium: Stadio Teofilo Patini; Attendance: 1,025; Referee: Sabina Bolić (Croatia)

8 Jul 2022 (England) 2022 EC GS	Spain	4–1	Finland	Milton Keynes, United Kingdom
17:00	Guerrero 26'; Bonmatí 41'; L. García 75'; M. Caldentey 90+5' (pen.)	Report	Sällström 1'	Stadium: Stadium MK; Attendance: 16,819; Referee: Kateryna Monzul (Ukraine)

12 Jul 2022 (England) 2022 EC GS	Germany	2–0	Spain	London, United Kingdom
20:00	Bühl 3'; Popp 37'	Report		Stadium: Brentford Community Stadium; Attendance: 16,037; Referee: Stéphanie Frappart (France)

16 Jul 2022 (England) 2022 EC GS	Denmark	0–1	Spain	London, United Kingdom
21:00		Report	Cardona 90'	Stadium: Brentford Community Stadium; Attendance: 16,041; Referee: Rebecca Welch (England)

20 Jul 2022 (England) 2022 EC QF	England	2–1 (a.e.t.)	Spain	Brighton and Hove
21:00	Toone 84'; Stanway 96'	Report	González 54'	Stadium: Falmer Stadium; Attendance: 28,994; Referee: Stéphanie Frappart (France)

2 Sep 2022 2023 WC Q	Spain	3–0	Hungary	Las Rozas de Madrid
21:00	González 24'; Paredes 27'; Guijarro 74'	Report		Stadium: La Ciudad del Fútbol; Attendance: 950; Referee: Ivana Projkovska (North Macedonia)

6 Sep 2022 2023 WC Q	Spain	5–0	Ukraine	Las Rozas de Madrid
21:00	González 15', 42'; Redondo 29', 39'; Hermoso 67' (pen.)	Report		Stadium: La Ciudad del Fútbol; Attendance: 867; Referee: Jelena Cvetković (Serbia)

7 Oct 2022 Friendly	Spain	1–1	Sweden	Córdoba
20:30	Cardona 84'	Report	Blomqvist 14'	Stadium: Estadio Nuevo Arcángel; Attendance: 5,658; Referee: Sandra Braz (Portugal)

11 Oct 2022 Friendly	Spain	2–0	United States	Pamplona
20:35	Codina 39'; González 72'			Stadium: Sadar; Attendance: 11,209; Referee: Deborah Bianchi (Italy)

11 Nov 2022 Friendly	Spain	7–0	Argentina	Melilla
20:00	Redondo 20'; Oroz 28'; Paralluelo 36', 38', 51' del Castillo 60'; Gabarro 78'	Report		Stadium: Álvarez Claro; Attendance: 3,119; Referee: Abigail Byrne (England)

15 Nov 2022 Friendly	Spain	1–0	Japan	Seville
20:00	Redondo 8'	Report		Stadium: La Cartuja; Attendance: 1,400; Referee: Ioanna Allayiotou (Cyprus)

16 Feb 2023 2023 Cup of Nations	Spain	3–0	Jamaica	Gosford, Australia
16:10	Oroz 18'; González 45+2'; Benítez 78'	Report		Stadium: Central Coast Stadium; Attendance: 600; Referee: Lara Lee (Australia)

19 Feb 2023 2023 Cup of Nations	Australia	3–2	Spain	Sydney
18:00	Vie 11'; Polkinghorne 16'; Foord 42'	Report	Carmona 74'; Redondo 90+4'	Stadium: CommBank Stadium; Attendance: 17,333; Referee: Yoshimi Yamashita (Japan)

22 Feb 2023 2023 Cup of Nations	Czech Republic	0–3	Spain	Newcastle, Australia
15:00		Report	González 29', 40' del Castillo 84' (pen.)	Stadium: McDonald Jones Stadium; Attendance: 300; Referee: Rebecca Durcau (Australia)

6 Apr 2023 Friendly	Spain	4–2	Norway	Ibiza
18:00	Hermoso 17', 22'; Paralluelo 52', 54'	Report	Hegerberg 20'; Andreassen 86'	Stadium: Can Misses; Attendance: 2,336; Referee: Ivana Projkovsk (North Macedonia)

11 Apr 2023 Friendly	Spain	3–0	China	Ibiza
18:00	Abelleira 45' del Castillo 61'; Redondo 81'	Report		Stadium: Estadi Municipal de Can Misses; Attendance: 3,211; Referee: Jana Adámková (Czech Republic)

29 Jun 2023 Friendly	Spain	7–0	Panama	Avilés
21:00	González 7', 44'; Putellas 22'; Espinosa 28' (o.g.); Guerrero 36' (pen.); Navarro 43' del Castillo 67'	Report		Stadium: Ramón Suárez Puerta; Attendance: 3,611; Referee: Eleni Antoniou (Greece)

5 Jul 2023 Friendly	Denmark	0–2	Spain	Gladsaxe
18:00		Report	Battle 7'; Paralluelo 53'	Stadium: Gladsaxe Stadium; Attendance: 2,223; Referee: Maral Mirzai Beni (Sweden)

21 Jul 2023 (Australia) (New Zealand) 2023 WC GS	Spain	3–0	Costa Rica	Wellington, New Zealand
19:30	del Campo 21' (o.g.); Bonmatí 23'; González 27'	Report		Stadium: Wellington Regional Stadium; Attendance: 22,966; Referee: Casey Reibelt (Australia)

26 Jul 2023 (Australia) (New Zealand) 2023 WC GS	Spain	5–0	Zambia	Auckland, New Zealand
19:30	Abelleira 9'; Hermoso 13', 70'; Redondo 69', 85'	Report		Stadium: Eden Park; Attendance: 20,983; Referee: Oh Hyeon-jeong (South Korea)

31 Jul 2023 (Australia) (New Zealand) 2023 WC GS	Japan	4–0	Spain	Wellington, New Zealand
19:00	Miyazawa 12', 40'; Ueki 29'; Tanaka 82'	Report		Stadium: Wellington Regional Stadium; Attendance: 20,957; Referee: Ekaterina Koroleva (United States)

5 Aug 2023 (Australia) (New Zealand) 2023 WC R16	Switzerland	1–5	Spain	Auckland, New Zealand
17:00	Codina 11' (o.g.)	Report	Bonmatí 5', 36'; Redondo 17'; Codina 45'; Hermoso 70'	Stadium: Eden Park; Attendance: 43,217; Referee: Cheryl Foster (Wales)

11 Aug 2023 (Australia) (New Zealand) 2023 WC QF	Spain	2–1 (a.e.t.)	Netherlands	Wellington, New Zealand
13:00	Caldentey 81' (pen.); Paralluelo 111'	Report	Van der Gragt 90+1'	Stadium: Wellington Regional Stadium; Attendance: 32,021; Referee: Stéphanie Frappart (France)

15 Aug 2023 (Australia) (New Zealand) 2023 WC SF	Spain	2–1	Sweden	Auckland, New Zealand
20:00	Paralluelo 81'; Carmona 89'	Report	Blomqvist 88'	Stadium: Eden Park; Attendance: 43,217; Referee: Edina Alves Batista (Brazil)

20 Aug 2023 (Australia) (New Zealand) 2023 WC Final	Spain	1–0	England	Sydney, Australia
20:00	Carmona 29'	Report		Stadium: Stadium Australia; Attendance: 75,784; Referee: Tori Penso (United States)

22 Sep 2023 2023–24 NL-A	Sweden	2–3	Spain	Gothenburg
18:30	Eriksson 23'; Hurtig 82'	Report	del Castillo 37'; Navarro 77'; Caldentey 90+6' (pen.)	Stadium: Gamla Ullevi; Attendance: 16,114; Referee: Rebecca Welch (England)

26 Sep 2023 2023–24 NL-A	Spain	5–0	Switzerland	Córdoba
21:00	L. García 15'; Bonmatí 45+1', 49'; Gabarro 57'; Oroz 87'	Report		Stadium: Estadio Nuevo Arcángel; Attendance: 14,194; Referee: Monika Mularczyk (Poland)

27 Oct 2023 2023–24 NL-A	Italy	0–1	Spain	Salerno
17:45		Report	Hermoso 89'	Stadium: Stadio Arechi; Attendance: 4,694; Referee: Alina Peşu (Romania)

31 Oct 2023 2023–24 NL-A	Switzerland	1–7	Spain	Zürich
19:00	Pilgrim 69'	Report	Hernández 4'; Putellas 11', 62' (pen.); Méndez 56' del Castillo 72', 89'; Oroz 90+3'	Stadium: Letzigrund; Attendance: 8,515; Referee: Iuliana Demetrescu (Romania)

1 Dec 2023 2023–24 NL-A	Spain	2–3	Italy	Pontevedra
21:30	del Castillo 12'; González 76'	Report	Giacinti 46'; Cambiaghi 57'; Linari 64'	Stadium: Pasarón; Attendance: 9,212; Referee: Eleni Antoniou (Greece)

5 Dec 2023 2023–24 NL-A	Spain	5–3	Sweden	Málaga
19:00	Paralluelo 11'; del Castillo 51'; Caldentey 78', 89'; Benítez 81'	Report	Zigiotti Olme 1'; Asllani 14'; Blackstenius 29'	Stadium: La Rosaleda; Attendance: 15,896; Referee: Kateryna Monzul (Ukraine)

23 Feb 2024 (Europe) 2024 NL SF	Spain	3–0	Netherlands	Seville
21:00	Hermoso 41'; Bonmatí 45'; Batlle 77'	Report		Stadium: La Cartuja; Attendance: 21,856; Referee: Rebecca Welch (England)

28 Feb 2024 (Europe) 2024 NL Final	Spain	2–0	France	Seville
19:00	Bonmatí 32'; Caldentey 53'	Report		Stadium: La Cartuja; Attendance: 32,657; Referee: Tess Olofsson (Sweden)

5 Apr 2024 2025 EC Q	Belgium	0–7	Spain	Leuven
20:45		Report	Paralluelo 8', 30', 47'; Hermoso 16'; González 64', 90'; S. García 85'	Stadium: Den Dreef; Attendance: 7,123; Referee: Katalin Kulcsár (Hungary)

9 Apr 2024 2025 EC Q	Spain	3–1	Czech Republic	Burgos
19:00	Méndez 58'; Hermoso 62'; Caldentey 70'	Report	Sonntágová 56'	Stadium: El Plantío; Attendance: 9,982; Referee: Jelena Cvetković (Serbia)

31 May 2024 2025 EC Q	Denmark	0–2	Spain	Vejle
19:00		Report	Hermoso 17'; Caldentey 28' (pen.)	Stadium: Vejle Stadion; Attendance: 6,014; Referee: Ivana Projkovska (North Macedonia)

4 Jun 2024 2025 EC Q	Spain	3–2	Denmark	Santa Cruz de Tenerife
21:30	Vilamala 74'; Paredes 76'; L. García 90+2'	Report	Thomsen 8', 72'	Stadium: Heliodoro Rodríguez López; Attendance: 17,532; Referee: Maria Sole Ferrieri Caputi (Italy)

12 Jul 2024 2025 EC Q	Czech Republic	2–1	Spain	Chomutov
18:00	Svitková 44' Bartoňová 51' (pen.)	Report	Bonmatí 15'	Stadium: Letní stadion Attendance: 1,893; Referee: Riem Hussein (Germany)

16 Jul 2024 2025 EC Q	Spain	2–0	Belgium	A Coruña
19:00	Bonmatí 39'; Abelleira 90+1'	Report		Stadium: Riazor; Attendance: 16,650; Referee: Iuliana Demetrescu (Romania)

25 Jul 2024 (Paris) 2024 OG GS	Spain	2–1	Japan	Nantes, France
17:00	Bonmatí 22'; Caldentey 74'	Report	Fujino 13'	Stadium: Stade de la Beaujoire; Attendance: 10,377; Referee: Bouchra Karboubi (Morocco)

28 Jul 2024 (Paris) 2024 OG GS	Spain	1–0	Nigeria	Nantes, France
19:00	Putellas 85'	Report		Stadium: Stade de la Beaujoire; Attendance: 11,079; Referee: Tori Penso (United States)

31 Jul 2024 (Paris) 2024 OG GS	Brazil	0–2	Spain	Bordeaux, France
17:00		Report	del Castillo 68'; Putellas 90+17'	Stadium: Stade de Bordeaux; Attendance: 14,497; Referee: Espen Eskås (Norway)

3 Aug 2024 (Paris) 2024 OG QF	Spain	2–2 (a.e.t.) (4–2 p)	Colombia	Décines-Charpieu, France
17:00	Hermoso 79'; Paredes 90+7'	Report	Ramírez 12'; Santos 52'	Stadium: Stade de Lyon; Attendance: 10,355; Referee: Katia García (Mexico)
	Penalties
	Caldentey (penalty scored); Navarro (penalty scored); Paralluelo (penalty scored); Bonmatí (penalty scored)		(penalty missed) Usme; (penalty scored) Vanegas; (penalty missed) Salazar; (penalty scored) Carabalí

6 Aug 2024 (Paris) 2024 OG SF	Brazil	4–2	Spain	Marseille, France
21:00	Paredes 6' (o.g.); Gabi Portilho 45+4'; Adriana 72'; Kerolin 90+1'	Report	Sampaio 85' (o.g.); Paralluelo 90+12'	Stadium: Stade de Marseille; Attendance: 14,201; Referee: Rebecca Welch (Great Britain)

9 Aug 2024 (Paris) 2024 OG Bronze	Spain	0–1	Germany	Décines-Charpieu, France
15:00		Report	Gwinn 64' (pen.)	Stadium: Stade de Lyon; Attendance: 10,995; Referee: Katia García (Mexico)

25 Oct 2024 Friendly	Spain	1–1	Canada	Almendralejo
22:00	Martín-Prieto 88'	Report	Alidou d'Anjou 49'	Stadium: Francisco de la Hera; Attendance: 8,000; Referee: Ewa Augustyn (Poland)

29 Oct 2024 Friendly	Italy	1–1	Spain	Vicenza
18:15	Beccari 88'	Report	Redondo 86'	Stadium: Stadio Romeo Menti; Attendance: 4,700; Referee: Franziska Wildfeuer (Germany)

29 Nov 2024 Friendly	Spain	5–0	South Korea	Cartagena
19:00	Pina 4'; Sarriegi 33'; Bonmatí 45+1'; López 63', 90+3'	Report		Stadium: Estadio Cartagonova; Attendance: 8,672; Referee: Kirsty Dowle (England)

3 Dec 2024 Friendly	France	2–4	Spain	Nice
21:00	Méndez 37' (o.g.); Diani 71'	Report	Bonmatí 6'; Pina 23'; L. García 60'; Caldentey 81' (pen.)	Stadium: Stade de Nice; Attendance: 6,233; Referee: Ionela Peşu (Romania)

21 Feb 2025 2025 NL-A	Spain	3–2	Belgium	Valencia
18:45	Pina 77'; García 90+2'; Martín-Prieto 90+6'	Report	Toloba 18'; Wullaert 72'	Stadium: Estadi Ciutat de València; Attendance: 9,369; Referee: Frida Klarlund (Denmark)

26 Feb 2025 2025 NL-A	England	1–0	Spain	London
20:00	Park 33'	Report		Stadium: Wembley Stadium; Attendance: 46,550; Referee: Tess Olofsson (Sweden)

4 Apr 2025 2025 NL-A	Portugal	2–4	Spain	Paços de Ferreira
19:45	Amado 27'; Costa 56' (pen.)	Report	Guijarro 25'; Aleixandri 40'; Pina 43'; Esther 89'	Stadium: Estádio Capital do Móvel; Attendance: 5,225; Referee: Iuliana Demetrescu (Romania)

8 Apr 2025 2025 NL-A	Spain	7–1	Portugal	Vigo
19:00	Paralluelo 2'; Bonmatí 8', 12'; Putellas 28', 51'; Caldentey 47'; Esther 60'	Report	Fonseca 71'	Stadium: Balaídos; Attendance: 15,526; Referee: Stéphanie Frappart (France)

30 May 2025 2025 NL-A	Belgium	1–5	Spain	Leuven
20:30	De Caigny 88'	Report	Esther 26', 64'; del Castillo 78', 79'; Redondo 85'	Stadium: Den Dreef; Attendance: 8,054; Referee: Ewa Augustyn (Poland)

3 Jun 2025 2025 NL-A	Spain	2–1	England	Cornellà de Llobregat
19:00	Pina 60', 70'	Report	Russo 22'	Stadium: RCDE Stadium; Attendance: 14,107; Referee: Katalin Kulcsár (Hungary)

27 Jun 2025 Friendly	Spain	3–1	Japan	Leganés
21:00	Pina 44'; López 66' del Castillo 88'		Tanaka 30'	Stadium: Butarque; Attendance: 9,458; Referee: Milica Milovanović (Serbia)

3 Jul 2025 (Switzerland) 2025 EC GS	Spain	5–0	Portugal	Bern, Switzerland
21:00	González 2', 43'; López 7'; Putellas 41'; Martín-Prieto 90+3'	Report		Stadium: Stadion Wankdorf; Attendance: 29,520; Referee: Iuliana Demetrescu (Romania)

7 Jul 2025 (Switzerland) 2025 EC GS	Spain	6–2	Belgium	Thun, Switzerland
18:00	Putellas 22', 86'; Paredes 39'; González 52'; Caldentey 61'; Pina 81'	Report	Vanhaevermaet 24'; Eurlings 51'	Stadium: Arena Thun; Attendance: 7,961; Referee: Katalin Kulcsár (Hungary)

11 Jul 2025 (Switzerland) 2025 EC GS	Italy	1–3	Spain	Bern, Switzerland
21:00	Oliviero 10'	Report	del Castillo 14'; Guijarro 49'; González 90+1'	Stadium: Stadion Wankdorf; Attendance: 29,644; Referee: Iuliana Demetrescu (Romania)

18 Jul 2025 (Switzerland) 2025 EC QF	Switzerland	0–2	Spain	Bern
21:00		Report	del Castillo 66'; Pina 71'	Stadium: Stadion Wankdorf; Attendance: 29,734; Referee: Maria Sole Ferrieri Caputi (Italy)

23 Jul 2025 (Switzerland) 2025 EC SF	Germany	0–1 (a.e.t.)	Spain	Zurich, Switzerland
21:00		Report	Bonmatí 113'	Stadium: Stadion Letzigrund; Attendance: 22,432; Referee: Edina Alves Batista (Brazil)

27 Jul 2025 (Switzerland) 2025 EC Final	England	1–1 (a.e.t.) (3–1 p)	Spain	Basel, Switzerland
18:00	Russo 57'	Report	Caldentey 25'	Stadium: St. Jakob-Park; Attendance: 34,203; Referee: Stéphanie Frappart (France)
	Penalties
	Mead (penalty missed); Greenwood (penalty scored); Charles (penalty scored); Williamson (penalty missed); Kelly (penalty scored)		(penalty scored) Guijarro; (penalty missed) Caldentey; (penalty missed) Bonmatí; (penalty missed) Paralluelo

24 Oct 2025 (Europe) 2025 NL SF	Spain	4–0	Sweden	Málaga
20:00	Putellas 11', 35'; Pina 32', 90+3'	Report		Stadium: La Rosaleda; Attendance: 20,929; Referee: Iuliana Demetrescu (Romania)

28 Oct 2025 (Europe) 2025 NL SF	Sweden	0–1	Spain	Gothenburg
19:00		Report	Putellas 74'	Stadium: Gamla Ullevi; Attendance: 15,873; Referee: Ivana Martinčić (Croatia)

28 Nov 2025 (Europe) 2025 NL Final	Germany	0–0	Spain	Kaiserslautern
20:30		Report		Stadium: Fritz-Walter-Stadion; Attendance: 40,156; Referee: Iuliana Demetrescu (Romania)

2 Dec 2025 (Europe) 2025 NL Final	Spain	3–0	Germany	Madrid
18:30	Pina 61', 74'; López 68'	Report		Stadium: Metropolitano Stadium; Attendance: 55,843; Referee: Silvia Gasperotti (Italy)

3 Mar 2026 2027 WC Q	Spain	3–0	Iceland	Castelló de la Plana
19:00	Pina 39', 54'; Imade 76'	Report (FIFA); Report (UEFA)		Stadium: Estadio Municipal de Castalia; Attendance: 7,586; Referee: Emanuela Rusta (Albania)

7 Mar 2026 2027 WC Q	Ukraine	1–3	Spain	Antalya, Turkey (Note: Due to the Russian invasion of Ukraine, Ukraine are required to play their home matches at neutral venues until further notice.)
20:00	Ovdiychuk 76'	Report (FIFA); Report (UEFA)	Imade 44'; Corrales 45+3'; López 55' (pen.)	Stadium: Mardan Sports Complex; Attendance: 264; Referee: Maïka Vanderstichel (France)

14 Apr 2026 2027 WC Q	England	1–0	Spain	London
19:00 UTC+1	Hemp 3'	Report (FIFA); Report (UEFA)		Stadium: Wembley Stadium; Attendance: 62,306; Referee: Tess Olofsson (Sweden)

18 Apr 2026 2027 WC Q	Spain	5–0	Ukraine	Córdoba
16:00	Imade 2', 47'; Méndez 61'; Navarro 71'; López 76'	Report (FIFA); Report (UEFA)		Stadium: Nuevo Arcángel; Attendance: 10,768; Referee: Fabienne Michel (Germany)

5 Jun 2026 2027 WC Q	Spain	4–0	England	Palma
21:00	Guijarro 19'; Putellas 37', 55'; Pina 78'	Report		Stadium: Son Moix; Attendance: 17,528; Referee: Ivana Martinčić (Croatia)

9 Jun 2026 2027 WC Q	Iceland	1–6	Spain	Reykjavík
19:00	Boama 58'	Report	López 5', 50'; Imade 37'; Paralluelo 45'; Pina 68'; Bonmatí 84'	Stadium: Laugardalsvöllur; Attendance: 2,517; Referee: Miriama Bočková (Slovenia)

10 Oct 2026 Friendly	United States	0–2	Spain	Washington, D.C.
14:37		Report	Guijarro 3'; Navarro 14'	Stadium: Audi Field; Attendance: 19,220; Referee: Diana Pérez (Mexico)

13 Oct 2026 Friendly	United States	2–2	Spain	Chester
19:00	Sanchez 49'; Swanson 86'	Report	Putellas 27'; Paralluelo 32'	Stadium: Subaru Park; Attendance: 18,648; Referee: Myriam Marcotte (Canada)

== Results in unofficial matches ==
This is a list of the Spain women's national football team's unofficial results from their inception to the present day that are not accorded the status of official internationals, not being recognized by FIFA.
Player appearances and goals in these matches are also not counted to their totals.

21 Feb 1971 Unofficial friendly	Spain	3–3	Portugal	Murcia
	Laura 15'; Conchi "Amancio" 25'; Cruz 50'	Report	Ana Santos 35'; Nini 65' (pen.); Ana María 80'	Stadium: La Condomina; Attendance: 3,000; Referee: Sánchez Ramos (Spain)

20 Jul 1971 Unofficial friendly	Italy	8–1	Spain	Turin
	Ciceri 4', 22', 35'; Vignotto 12', 40', 50'; Mammina 56'; Schiavo 59'	Report	Menchu Llopis 64'	Stadium: Stadio Comunale; Attendance: 7,000; Referee: Cosentino (Italy)

1 Nov 1972 Trofeo dell'Adriatico	Italy	5–0	Spain	Padua
	Bandini 5'; Vignotto 24', 28'; Babetto 48', 67'	Report		Referee: Marocco (Italy)

4 Nov 1972 Trofeo dell'Adriatico	Italy	3–0	Spain	Udine
	Bandini 30', 67'; Babetto 65'	Report		Referee: Beretta (Italy)

8 Dec 1972 Trofeo del Adriático	Spain	1–5	Italy	Córdoba
16:15	Conchi "Amancio" 59'	Report	Padovan 8'; Fabbri 13'; Gualdi 28'; Vignotto 40'; Schiavo 51'	Stadium: El Arcángel; Referee: Acebes (Spain)

10 Dec 1972 Trofeo del Adriático	Spain	1–4	Italy	Badajoz
	Coda 22' (o.g.)	Report	Schiavo 4'; Vignotto 20', 34'; Babetto 46'	Referee: Acebes (Spain)

23 May 1981 Unofficial friendly	Italy XI	5–1	Spain XI	Salsomaggiore Terme
17:30	Golin 15'; Vignotto 27' (pen.), 39'; Saldi 30'; Pierazzuoli 69'	Report	Domingo 50'	Stadium: Clemente Francani; Referee: Podavini (Italy)

7 Sep 1983 Torneo di Castelsardo	Italy XI	4–0	Spain XI	Laerru
	Boniface 16'; Morace 24', 59'; Vignotto 40'	Report		Stadium: Mario Mossa Pirisino; Referee: Varriale (Italy)

15 Dec 1984 Unofficial friendly	Spain XI	2–3	Belgium XI	Seville
16:30	Castañón 1'; Milagros 2'	Report	Martens 52'; Van De Maelen 55'; Schrymecker 62'	Stadium: Benito Villamarín; Attendance: 6,000; Referee: Manuel Álvarez Margüenda (Spain)

23 May 1987 Unofficial friendly	Belgium XI	2–1	Spain XI	Machelen
16:30	Deschepper 36'; Maus 46'	Report Report	Artola 55'	Stadium: Sportstadion Deroover; Referee: Frans van den Wijngaert (Belgium)

31 Mar 1992 1992 Grand Hotel Varna Tournament	CIS XI	0–2	Spain	Varna, Bulgaria
		Report	Prieto 58', 76'	Referee: Georgi Balinov (Bulgaria)

5 Apr 1992 1992 Grand Hotel Varna Tournament	FC Grand Hotel Varna	0–2	Spain XI	Varna
		Report	Prieto; B. García	Referee: Mestropov (Bulgaria)

7 Apr 1995 1995 Grand Hotel Varna Tournament	Sweden under-20	4–0	Spain	Varna, Bulgaria
	Sandell; Heponiemi; Kindvall; Fredrikssom	Report		Referee: Dimitar Ivanov (Bulgaria)

12 Mar 2013 Unofficial friendly	Community of Madrid	1–1	Spain	Las Rozas de Madrid
19:00	36'	Report	Bermúdez 30'	Stadium: La Ciudad del Fútbol

1 Oct 2013 Training match	Spain XI	2–0	Rayo Vallecano	Las Rozas de Madrid
19:00	Zornoza 20'; Bermúdez 26'			Stadium: La Ciudad del Fútbol

23 Oct 2014 Unofficial friendly	Community of Madrid	0–6	Spain	Las Rozas de Madrid
19:00		Report	Meseguer 4'; Torrejón 7'; Natalia 12', 14'; Putellas 40'; Adriana 79'	Stadium: La Ciudad del Fútbol

19 Nov 2014 Training match	Spain XI	1–0	Rayo Vallecano	Las Rozas de Madrid
	Pablos 14'	Report		Stadium: La Ciudad del Fútbol

15 Jan 2015 Training match	Spain XI	1–0	Atlético Madrid	Las Rozas de Madrid
20:00	Bermúdez 9'	Report		Stadium: La Ciudad del Fútbol; Referee: Beatriz Gil

20 Oct 2016 Training match	Spain XI	3–0	Rayo Vallecano	Las Rozas de Madrid
20:00	Losada; Putellas; Hermoso	Report		Stadium: La Ciudad del Fútbol

22 Jan 2017 Unofficial friendly	Spain XI	8–1	Switzerland XI	Oliva
16:00	Hermoso; O. García; Boquete; Sampedro; Caldentey; E.González	Report	M. Müller	Stadium: Sports Center

19 Oct 2017 Training match	Spain XI	4–0	Rayo Vallecano	Las Rozas de Madrid
19:00	Putellas; Latorre; Hermoso; O. García			Stadium: La Ciudad del Fútbol

3 Oct 2018 Training match	Spain XI	8–0	Rayo Vallecano	Las Rozas de Madrid
18:30	Menayo; O. García (pen.); Guerrero (pen.) (o.g.); Caldentey; Nahikari; Falcón	Report		Stadium: La Ciudad del Fútbol

6 Oct 2018 Training match	Spain XI	9–0	Madrid CFF	Las Rozas de Madrid
10:30	Bonmatí; Gili; González; Redondo; Nahikari; Celia	Report		Stadium: La Ciudad del Fútbol

7 Nov 2019 Training match	Spain XI	3–2	Spain under-23	Las Rozas de Madrid
11:30	Bonmatí 25'; Mendoza 48' (o.g.); Guerrero 54'	Report	Pardo 36'; Domínguez 42'	Stadium: La Ciudad del Fútbol

14 Jul 2023 Unofficial friendly	Việt Nam XI	0–9	Spain XI	Auckland, New Zealand
12:30		Report	Redondo 7'; del Castillo 12'; Paralluelo 51', 88'; González 60', 65'; Hermoso 63', 83'; Bonmatí 71'	Stadium: McLennan Park; Attendance: 0 (Closed door game); Referee: Campbell-Kirk Kawana-Waugh (New Zealand)

== All-time team record ==
=== Head-to-head ===
The following table shows Spain's all-time international record, from February 5, 1983.

As of 14 October 2026

Rival	First	Last	Pld	W	D	L	GF	GA	GD	Win % (Note: A draw counts as a ½ win)
England	1993	2026	22	6	7	9	24	26	–2	43.18%
Belgium	1987	2025	19	14	3	2	61	16	+45	81.58%
Denmark	1989	2024	17	5	3	9	19	35	–16	38.24%
Sweden	1991	2025	16	5	4	7	22	39	–17	43.75%
France	1983	2024	15	2	3	10	14	24	–10	23.33%
Italy	1985	2025	15	4	5	6	17	19	–2	43.33%
Switzerland	1984	2025	13	8	2	3	32	12	+20	69.23%
Netherlands	1999	2024	12	7	3	2	14	7	+7	70.83%
Germany	1997	2025	11	2	4	5	7	18	–11	36.36%
Czech Republic	2007	2024	10	8	1	1	27	9	+18	85%
Poland	1992	2021	9	4	2	3	19	11	+8	55.56%
Russia	1993	2013	8	4	2	2	10	7	+3	62.5%
Romania	1995	2016	8	5	3	0	16	4	+12	81.25%
Austria	2009	2018	8	6	2	0	16	3	+13	87.5%
Scotland	1998	2022	8	5	2	1	22	6	+16	75%
Finland	2005	2022	8	6	2	0	21	5	+16	87.5%
Portugal	1983	2025	8	7	0	1	25	5	+20	87.5%
Japan	2017	2025	7	5	1	1	12	9	+3	78.57%
Iceland	1998	2026	7	3	3	1	16	6	+10	64.29%
Hungary	1985	2022	6	2	0	4	14	9	+5	33.33%
Norway	2003	2023	6	2	0	4	9	11	–2	33.33%
Brazil	2015	2024	6	2	1	3	8	9	-1	41.67%
Ukraine	1997	2026	6	4	0	2	21	5	+16	66.67%
United States	2019	2026	6	2	1	3	7	6	+1	41.67%
Republic of Ireland	1991	2016	5	4	0	1	8	1	+7	80%
Turkey	2009	2012	4	4	0	0	24	2	+22	100%
China	2015	2023	4	3	1	0	8	2	+6	87.5%
Canada	2017	2024	4	2	2	0	3	1	+2	75%
Serbia (Note: Includes a friendly match against former FR Yugoslavia on 2 July 1996)	1996	2018	3	2	1	0	6	2	+4	83.33%
Czechoslovakia †	1987	1988	2	0	0	2	0	3	–3	0%
Bulgaria	1987	1988	2	1	1	0	2	1	+1	75%
Slovenia	1994	1994	2	2	0	0	25	0	+25	100%
Belarus	2007	2008	2	2	0	0	9	1	+8	100%
Northern Ireland	2008	2008	2	2	0	0	7	0	+7	100%
Malta	2009	2010	2	2	0	0	22	0	+22	100%
Kazakhstan	2011	2012	2	2	0	0	17	0	+17	100%
Macedonia	2014	2014	2	2	0	0	22	0	+22	100%
Estonia	2013	2014	2	2	0	0	11	0	+11	100%
New Zealand	2015	2015	2	0	2	0	2	2	0	50%
Montenegro	2016	2016	2	2	0	0	20	0	+20	100%
Israel	2017	2018	2	2	0	0	8	0	+8	100%
Moldova	2020	2020	2	2	0	0	19	0	+19	100%
Azerbaijan	2019	2021	2	2	0	0	17	0	+17	100%
Faroe Islands	2021	2021	2	2	0	0	22	0	+22	100%
Australia	2022	2023	2	1	0	1	9	3	+6	50%
Costa Rica	2015	2023	2	1	1	0	4	1	+3	75%
South Korea	2015	2024	2	1	0	1	6	2	+4	50%
Slovakia	1996		1	0	1	0	1	1	0	50%
Cameroon	2019		1	1	0	0	4	0	+4	100%
South Africa	2019		1	1	0	0	3	1	+2	100%
Mexico	2021		1	1	0	0	3	0	+3	100%
Morocco	2021		1	1	0	0	3	0	+3	100%
Argentina	2022		1	1	1	0	7	0	+7	100%
Jamaica	2023		1	1	0	0	3	0	+3	100%
Panama	2023		1	1	0	0	7	0	+7	100%
Zambia	2023		1	1	0	0	5	0	+5	100%
Nigeria	2024		1	1	0	0	1	0	+1	100%
Colombia	2024		1	0	1	0	2	2	0	50%
Chile	2026		0	0	0	0	0	0	0	
Venezuela	2026		0	0	0	0	0	0	0	
Summary	1983	2026	318	170	64	84	764	330	+434	63.52%

Opponents against those who have never played

Only national teams affiliated with UEFA or that have participated in the FIFA Women's World Cup.

Confederation	Nation	Highest FIFA ranking
	Wales	29th
	Croatia	44th
	Greece	50th
	Bosnia & Herzevogina	57th
	Albania	59th
	Lithuania	60th
	Latvia	61st
	Luxembourg	70th
	Armenia	83rd
	Georgia	88th
	Kosovo	91st
	Cyprus	93rd
	Andorra	114th
	Gibraltar (Note: The matches between Gibraltar and Spain are restrictioned for political reasons)	185th
	Liechtenstein	187th
	San Marino	no ranked
	Ghana	42nd (1 appearance)
	Equatorial Guinea	50th (1 appearance)
	Ivory Coast	59th (1 appearance)
	North Korea	5th (4 appearances)
	Chinese Taipei	22nd (1 appearance)
	Thailand	28th (2 appearances)
	Vietnam	28th (1 appearance)
	Philippines	38th (1 appearance)
	Haiti	49th (1 appearance)
	Ecuador	46th (1 appearance)

=== Performance year by year ===
Year	Rank	Pld	W	D	L	GF	GA	top scorer(s)	Goal
1983		3	0	1	2	0	3	No goals scored	
1984		2	1	1	0	3	2	3 players	1
1985		3	0	0	3	2	6	Hernández, Prieto	1
1986		3	1	1	1	5	3	Y. García, Hernández	2
1987		4	1	1	2	2	3	Artola, Hernández	1
1988		5	1	1	3	2	6	Artola	2
1989		2	0	1	1	1	3	Bakero	1
1990		4	0	1	3	2	10	Artola, Parejo	1
1991		2	0	0	2	0	5	No goals scored	
1992		4	2	1	1	6	3	Prieto	3
1993		4	0	3	1	2	3	Blázquez, Castillo	1
1994		5	4	1	0	30	0	Prieto	10
1995		5	2	1	2	9	9	Prieto	5
1996		10	2	5	3	13	22	Prieto	7
1997		6	1	1	4	4	12	Parejo	3
1998		8	2	2	4	13	12	Prieto	3
1999		3	0	1	2	3	7	3 players	1
2000		5	1	0	4	6	20	Gimbert, Mateos	2
2001		4	1	0	3	8	10	Auxi, del Río	2
2002		4	1	1	2	2	5	Auxi, del Río	1
2003	20th ▲	2	1	0	1	1	2	del Río	1
2004	20th	6	1	1	4	9	8	del Río	5
2005	20th	6	2	3	1	10	9	Cabezón, del Río	3
2006	20th	4	2	1	1	11	7	Adriana	7
2007	20th	3	1	1	1	5	3	5 players	1
2008	20th	7	4	1	2	19	8	Boquete, Vázquez	4
2009	20th	4	4	0	0	21	0	Adriana	9
2010	19th ▲	4	2	1	1	16	4	Adriana	7
2011	17th ▲	5	4	1	0	23	5	Boquete	7
2012	18th ▼	8	4	2	2	28	13	Vilas	10
2013	15th ▲	11	6	3	2	21	12	Bermúdez, Boquete	5
2014	15th	7	5	1	1	31	2	Pablos	10
2015	14th ▲	13	7	4	2	21	12	Bermúdez, Losada	3
2016	14th	9	5	2	2	34	5	Boquete	7
2017	13th ▲	15	9	2	4	33	11	Hermoso	6
2018	12th ▲	12	10	2	0	24	2	Hermoso	4
2019	13th ▼	18	7	5	6	26	16	Hermoso	8
2020	13th	6	5	0	1	27	2	4 players	4
2021	9th ▲	12	12	0	0	72	0	González	13
2022	7th ▲	17	10	5	2	36	9	González	6
2023	1st ▲	20	17	0	3	65	21	del Castillo	8
2024	2nd ▼	18	12	3	3	43	17	Bonmatí	7
2025	1st ▲	17	14	2	1	50	13	Pina	11
2026	1st	8	6	1	1	25	5	Imade	5

== Competitive record ==
FIFA Women's World Cup
1991	DNQ	1995	DNQ	1999	DNQ	2003	DNQ
2007	DNQ	2011	DNQ	2015	20th	2019	OF (12th)
2023	Champion	2027	Qualified				

UEFA Women's Championship
1984	DNE	1987	DNQ	1989	DNQ	1991	DNQ
1993	DNQ	1995	DNQ	1997	SF (3rd)	2001	DNQ
2005	DNQ	2009	DNQ	2013	QF (7th)	2017	QF (8th)
2022	QF (6th)	2025	Runners-up				

Competition	1st place, gold medalist(s)	2nd place, silver medalist(s)	3rd place, bronze medalist(s)	Total
FIFA Women's World Cup	1	0	0	1
UEFA Women's Championship	0	1	1	2
Summer Olympic Games	0	0	0	0
UEFA Women's Nations League	2	0	0	2
Total	3	1	1	5

== Stats ==
=== Results frequency ===
GOALS	Against								
For	0	1	2	3	4	5	6	7	8
0	27	24	13	3	3	3	1	1	1
1	29	22	16	7			1		
2	22	15	14	5	3	1			
3	21	8	5		1	1			
4	12	6	5						
5	9	6		1					
6	3	2	1						
7	8	2							
8	2								
9	2	1							
10	3	1							
11									
12	2								
13	4								
...									
17	1								

=== Opponents ===
Confederations	Played	Won	Drawn	Lost	Goals
AFC	15	10	2	3	35–16
CAF	5	5	0	0	16–1
CONCACAF	15	8	4	3	27–8
CONMEBOL	8	3	2	3	17–11
OFC	2	0	2	0	2–2
UEFA	273	143	54	75	661–286
TOTAL	318	170	64	84	758–328

=== Biggest wins ===
Best Results by Spain
	Date	Opponent	Competition	Result
1	20 Mar 1994	Slovenia	(Germany) 1995 EC Q	17–0
2	19 Sep 2009	Malta	(Germany) 2011 WC Q	0–13
2	5 Apr 2012	Kazakhstan	(Sweden) 2013 EC Q	13–0
2	15 Sep 2016	Montenegro	(Netherlands) 2017 EC Q	13–0
2	18 Feb 2021	Azerbaijan	(England) 2022 EC Q	0–13

=== Biggest defeats ===
Worst Results by Spain
	Date	Opponent	Competition	Result
1	2 Jun 1996	Sweden	(Norway) (Sweden) 1997 EC Q	0–8
2	11 Jun 2000	Sweden	(Germany) 2001 EC Q	7–0
3	24 Apr 1997	Germany	Friendly	6–0

=== Longest unbeaten run ===
Games	Beginning			End (defeat)
Games	Date	Score	Opponent	Date	Score	Opponent
24	13 March 2020	1–0	England	12 June 2022	0–2	Germany

1,221 days without a defeat match (between 9 March 2020 and 12 June 2022)

=== Most consecutive wins ===
Games	Beginning			End
Games	Date	Score	Opponent	Date	Score	Opponent
16	11 Mar 2020	1–0	England	30 November 2021	8–0	Scotland

=== Longest run of games scored in ===
Games	Beginning			End
Games	Date	Score	Opponent	Date	Score	Opponent
23	5 Aug 2023	5–1	Switzerland	6 August	2–4	Brazil

=== Longest streak without conceding a goal ===
Games	Beginning			End
Games	Date	Score	Opponent	Date	Score	Opponent
16	11 Mar 2020	1–0	England	30 November 2021	8–0	Scotland

1,531 minutes without allowing goals (between 9 March 2020 and 17 February 2022)

== Venues in Spain ==
Only official matches

Locations that held at least one game.
Locations on Community of Madrid

City	Pld	W	D	L	First	Last
(Community of Madrid) Las Rozas de Madrid	18	13	3	2	2003	2022
(Andalusia) Córdoba	6	4	2	0	1998	2026
(Andalusia) Seville	6	6	0	0	2020	2024
(Region of Murcia) San Pedro del Pinatar	5	4	1	0	2013	2018
(Region of Murcia) Cartagena	4	1	2	1	1990	2024
(Castilla–La Mancha) Guadalajara	4	2	1	1	2010	2019
(Castile and León) Aranda de Duero	3	2	1	0	2006	2010
(Community of Madrid) Aranjuez	3	2	1	0	1983	2013
(Community of Madrid) Leganés	3	3	0	0	2016	2025
(La Rioja) Logroño	3	2	1	0	2014	2019
(Balearic Islands) Palma	3	2	0	1	1985	2026
(Andalusia) Pozoblanco	3	0	1	2	1995	2006
(Galicia (Spain)) A Coruña	2	2	0	0	2019	2024
(Community of Madrid) Alcorcón	2	2	0	0	2021	2021
(Valencian Community) Alicante	2	0	1	1	2019	2022
(Castile and León) Burgos	2	1	0	1	2000	2024
(Valencian Community) Castelló de la Plana	2	2	0	0	1996	2026
(Community of Madrid) Fuenlabrada	2	1	0	1	2013	2017
(Asturias) Gijón	2	1	0	1	1986	2015
(Balearic Islands) Ibiza	2	2	0	0	2023	2023
(Castilla–La Mancha) La Roda	2	0	2	0	2004	2015
(Andalusia) Lucena	2	0	0	2	1991	2004
(Andalusia) Málaga	2	2	0	0	2023	2025
(Andalusia) Marbella	2	2	0	0	2021	2021
(Andalusia) Motril	2	0	1	1	1998	2011
(Region of Murcia) Murcia	2	0	1	0	2002	2018
(Catalonia) Palamós	2	1	0	1	1991	1994
(Canary Islands) San Bartolomé de Tirajana	2	0	2	0	2005	2005
(Catalonia) Tarragona	2	0	1	1	1993	1993
(Galicia (Spain)) A Guarda	1	0	0	1	1983	
(Valencian Community) Alginet	1	1	0	0	2004	
(Extremadura) Almendralejo	1	0	1	0	2024	
(Andalusia) Antequera	1	0	0	1	1989	
(Asturias) Avilés	1	1	0	0	2023	
(Extremadura) Badajoz	1	1	0	0	2015	
(Catalonia) Barcelona	1	0	1	0	1984	
(Valencian Community) Benicàssim	1	0	1	0	1989	
(Extremadura) Cáceres	1	1	0	0	2021	
(Community of Madrid) Collado Villalba	1	1	0	0	2013	
(Catalonia) Cornellà de Llobregat	1	1	0	0	2025	
(Castilla–La Mancha) Cuenca	1	0	0	1	1985	
(Extremadura) Don Benito	1	1	0	0	2019	
(Catalonia) Figueres	1	0	0	1	1988	
(Valencian Community) Gandia	1	0	0	1	1996	
(Catalonia) Gavà	1	0	0	1	1997	
(Andalusia) Huelva	1	1	0	0	2022	
(Community of Madrid) Madrid	1	1	0	0	2025	
Melilla	1	1	0	0	2022	
(Region of Murcia) Molina de Segura	1	1	0	0	2002	
(Andalusia) Montilla	1	1	0	0	1996	
(Andalusia) Osuna	1	0	1	0	1993	
(Castile and León) Palencia	1	0	1	0	1998	
(Andalusia) Palma del Río	1	0	0	1	1988	
(Navarre) Pamplona	1	1	0	0	2022	
(Extremadura) Plasencia	1	0	0	1	1999	
(Galicia (Spain)) Pontevedra	1	0	0	1	2023	
(Community of Madrid) San Sebastián de los Reyes	1	1	0	0	2013	
(Canary Islands) Santa Cruz de Tenerife	1	1	0	0	2024	
(Cantabria) Santander	1	1	0	0	2018	
(Galicia (Spain)) Santiago de Compostela	1	1	0	0	2012	
(Castile and León) Segovia	1	1	0	0	2010	
(Aragon) Teruel	1	1	0	0	2001	
(Valencian Community) Torrent	1	1	0	0	1988	
(Catalonia) Tortosa	1	1	0	0	1994	
(Valencian Community) València	1	1	0	0	2025	
(Galicia (Spain)) Vigo	1	1	0	0	2025	
(Galicia (Spain)) Vilagarcía de Arousa	1	0	0	1	2000	
(Castile and León) Zamora	1	0	1	0	2008	

=== Record home attendances ===
- 55,843 vs. Germany at Metropolitano, Madrid (2 December 2025)
- 32,657 vs. France at La Cartuja, Seville (28 February 2024)
- 21,856 vs. Netherlands at La Cartuja, Seville (23 February 2024)
- 20,929 vs. Sweden at La Rosaleda, Málaga (24 October 2025)
- 17,532 vs. Denmark at Heliodoro Rodríguez López, Santa Cruz de Tenerife (4 June 2024)
- 17,528 vs. England at Son Moix, Palma (5 June 2026)
- 16,650 vs. Belgium at Riazor, A Coruña (16 July 2024)
- 15,896 vs. Sweden at La Rosaleda, Málaga (5 December 2023)
- 15,526 vs. Portugal at Balaídos, Vigo (8 April 2025)
- 14,194 vs. Switzerland at Nuevo Arcángel, Córdoba (26 September 2023)

=== Record out-of-home attendances ===
Away ground

- Official match: 46,550 vs. England at Wembley Stadium, London (26 February 2025)
- Friendly match: 26,500 vs. United States at Red Bull Arena, Harrison (9 March 2020)

Neutral ground

- Official match 75,784 vs. England at Stadium Australia, Sydney (20 August 2023)
- Friendly match: 10,507 vs. England at Toyota Stadium, Frisco (13 March 2020)
