= Itziar (given name) =

Itziar is a female Basque given name, derived from Our Lady of Itziar, near San Sebastian and the France-Spain border. Notable people with the name include:

- Itziar Bakero (born 1969), Spanish footballer
- Itziar Esparza (born 1974), Spanish swimmer
- Itziar Gurrutxaga (born 1977), Spanish footballer
- Itziar Ituño (born 1974), Spanish actress
- Itziar Mendizabal (born 1981), Spanish ballet dancer
- Itziar Okariz (born 1965), Spanish artist
- Itziar Pinillos (born 2000), Spanish footballer
