= Fran Carnicer =

Spanish footballer (born 1991)

Personal information
- Full name: Francisco José Carnicer Magán
- Date of birth: 30 March 1991 (age 35)
- Place of birth: Linares, Spain
- Height: 1.78 m (5 ft 10 in)
- Position: Attacking midfielder

Team information
- Current team: Motril

Youth career
- Linares
- 2008–2009: Poli Ejido
- 2009: Las Norias
- 2009–2010: Jaén

Senior career*
| Years | Team | Apps | (Gls) |
| 2007–2008 | Linares B | 2 | (0) |
| 2009 | Las Norias | 1 | (0) |
| 2009–2011 | Jaén B | 9 | (1) |
| 2010–2011 | Jaén | 19 | (0) |
| 2011–2013 | Osasuna B | 59 | (3) |
| 2013–2014 | La Hoya Lorca | 36 | (0) |
| 2014–2016 | Mirandés | 44 | (2) |
| 2016–2018 | Albacete | 35 | (1) |
| 2017–2018 | → Murcia (loan) | 26 | (0) |
| 2018–2019 | Ponferradina | 18 | (1) |
| 2018–2019 | Sanse | 13 | (2) |
| 2019–2022 | Linares Deportivo | 72 | (8) |
| 2022–2023 | Eldense | 35 | (0) |
| 2023 | Ceuta | 8 | (0) |
| 2024 | Linares Deportivo | 6 | (0) |
| 2024– | Motril | 0 | (0) |
- * Club domestic league appearances and goals as of 21 April 2024

Francisco 'Fran' José Carnicer Magán (born 30 March 1991) is a Spanish professional footballer who plays as a midfielder for Motril.

== Football career ==
Born in Linares, Jaén, Andalusia, Carnicer made his senior debuts for CD Linares' reserve team in the 2007–08 campaign. In the 2008 summer he moved to Polideportivo Ejido, returning to youth football before appearing with Las Norias CF's main squad in 2009.

In June 2009 Carnicer moved to Real Jaén, initially assigned to the Juvenil squad. He subsequently appeared with the B-side in the regional leagues, and made his first-team debut in the 2010–11 season, in Segunda División B.

On 7 July 2011 Carnicer signed a two-year deal with CA Osasuna, being assigned to the reserves also in the third level. After appearing regularly with the Navarrese outfit (also being relegated in his second season), he moved to fellow league team La Hoya Lorca CF.

On 15 July 2014 Carnicer joined Segunda División's CD Mirandés. He made his professional debut on 11 October, coming on as a late substitute in a 0–1 away loss against SD Ponferradina.

On 7 February 2015 Carnicer scored his first professional goal, netting the first in a 2–2 away draw against AD Alcorcón. He moved to Albacete Balompié in division three on 6 July 2016, and helped in their promotion at the end of the season.

Carnicer subsequently represented fellow third level sides Real Murcia, SD Ponferradina and UD San Sebastián de los Reyes. On 3 September 2019, he agreed to a contract with Tercera División side Linares Deportivo.

On 21 June 2022, after scoring a career-best six goals in the previous season, Carnicer signed for CD Eldense also in Primera Federación. He was regularly used during the campaign, contributing with 38 matches overall as they returned to the second level after a 59-year absence.
