= Mar Prieto =

Spanish footballer (born 1969)

Marimar Prieto
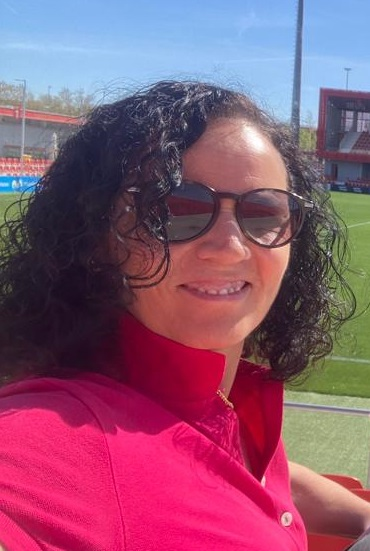

Personal information
- Full name: María del Mar Prieto Ibañez
- Date of birth: 1 March 1969 (age 57)
- Place of birth: Madrid, Spain
- Position: Striker

Senior career*
Years	Team	Apps	(Gls)
- Porvenir
1989–1991	Atlético Villa de Madrid		
1991–1998	Oroquieta Villaverde		
1998–1999	Takarazuka Bunny		
1999–2000	Oroquieta Villaverde		
2000–2002	Torrejón		
2002–2005	Levante		
2005–2008	Atlético Madrid		
2014–2015	Madrid CFF "B"	22	(15)

International career
1985–2000	Spain	62	(29)
1987–1992	Spain XI	3	(3)
- * Club domestic league appearances and goals

María del Mar Prieto Ibáñez is a Spanish football player. Throughout her career she played for Oroquieta Villaverde, AD Torrejón, Levante UD and Atlético Madrid in Spain's Superliga and Takarazuka Bunny in Japan's L. League.

She was a member of the Spain women's national football team, and played the 1997 European Championship.

== International career ==
Marimar Prieto made her senior international debut on 25 May 1985 in a 0–2 qualifying match lost with Switzerland in Cuenca.

=== International goals ===
Goal	Date	Venue	Opponent	Score	Result	Competition
1	3 November 1985	Lluís Sitjar Stadium, Palma	Italy	1–1	2–3	1987 European Competition qualifying
1	4 April 1992	Varna (Bulgaria)	Poland		4–0	1992 Grand Hotel Varna Tournament
3	4 April 1992	Varna (Bulgaria)	Poland		4–0	1992 Grand Hotel Varna Tournament
4	17 May 1992	Ryavallen, Borås	Sweden		1–1	UEFA Women's Euro 1993 qualifying
5	5 February 1994	Estádio Municipal, Chaves	Portugal	0–1	1–1	Friendly
6	20 March 1994	Nou Estadi, Palamós	Slovenia		17–0	UEFA Women's Euro 1995 qualifying
7	20 March 1994	Nou Estadi, Palamós	Slovenia		17–0	UEFA Women's Euro 1995 qualifying
8	20 March 1994	Nou Estadi, Palamós	Slovenia		17–0	UEFA Women's Euro 1995 qualifying
9	20 March 1994	Nou Estadi, Palamós	Slovenia		17–0	UEFA Women's Euro 1995 qualifying
10	20 March 1994	Nou Estadi, Palamós	Slovenia		17–0	UEFA Women's Euro 1995 qualifying
11	20 March 1994	Nou Estadi, Palamós	Slovenia		17–0	UEFA Women's Euro 1995 qualifying
12	20 March 1994	Nou Estadi, Palamós	Slovenia		17–0	UEFA Women's Euro 1995 qualifying
13	29 May 1994	Naklo	Slovenia	0–2	0–8	UEFA Women's Euro 1995 qualifying
14	29 May 1994	Naklo	Slovenia	0–3	0–8	UEFA Women's Euro 1995 qualifying
15	3 April 1995	Varna (Bulgaria)	Hungary	3–3	5–3	1995 Grand Hotel Varna Tournament
16	5 April 1995	Varna (Bulgaria)	Romania	1–1	1–2	1995 Grand Hotel Varna Tournament
17	5 April 1995	Varna (Bulgaria)	Romania	1–2	1–2	1995 Grand Hotel Varna Tournament
18	8 April 1995	Varna (Bulgaria)	Russia	2–2	2–4	1995 Grand Hotel Varna Tournament
19	8 April 1995	Varna (Bulgaria)	Russia	2–3	2–4	1995 Grand Hotel Varna Tournament
20	31 March 1996	Nou Estadi Castàlia, Castelló de la Plana	Romania	2–0	5–1	UEFA Women's Euro 1997 qualifying
21	31 March 1996	Nou Estadi Castàlia, Castelló de la Plana	Romania	3–0	5–1	UEFA Women's Euro 1997 qualifying
22	31 March 1996	Nou Estadi Castàlia, Castelló de la Plana	Romania	4–1	5–1	UEFA Women's Euro 1997 qualifying
23	1 May 1996	Stadionul Poiana, Câmpina	Romania	0–1	2–2	UEFA Women's Euro 1997 qualifying
24	12 May 1996	Gutavallen, Visby	Sweden	1–1	1–1	UEFA Women's Euro 1997 qualifying
25	8 September 1996	Estadio Municipal, Montilla	England	1–0	2–1	UEFA Women's Euro 1997 qualifying
26	8 September 1996	Estadio Municipal, Montilla	England	2–0	2–1	UEFA Women's Euro 1997 qualifying
27	3 May 1998	Estadio Escribano Castilla, Motril	Sweden	1–0	1–2	1999 FIFA Women's World Cup qualification
28	16 May 1998	La Route de Lorient, Rennes	France	2–2	3–2	Friendly
29	14 June 1998	Kópavogsvöllur, Kópavogur	Iceland	0–1	1–1	1999 FIFA Women's World Cup qualification
