= Ana Romero =

Spanish footballer

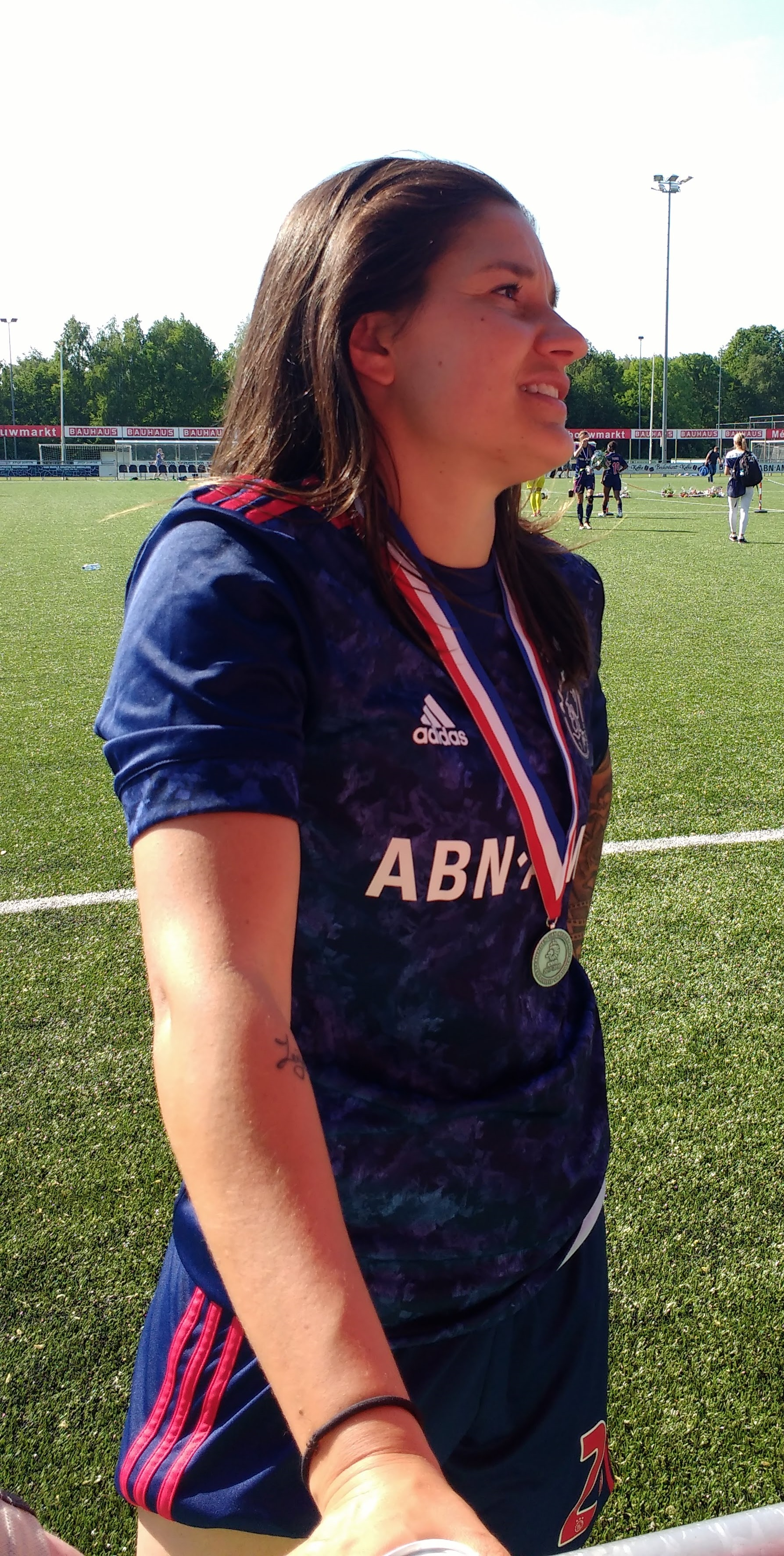
- Ana Romero with Ajax in May 2018

Personal information
- Full name: Ana María Romero Moreno
- Date of birth: 14 June 1987 (age 39)
- Place of birth: Seville, Andalusia, Spain
- Height: 1.64 m (5 ft 5 in)
- Position: Winger

Senior career*
Years	Team	Apps	(Gls)
- CD Híspalis
- Sevilla
2007–2010	Rayo Vallecano		
2010–2013	Espanyol	78	(47)
2013–2015	Barcelona	35	(10)
2015–2016	Valencia	18	(6)
2016–2018	Ajax	24	(2)
2018–2020	Real Betis	34	(2)

International career
2007–2012	Spain	13	(7)
- * Club domestic league appearances and goals as of 4 May 2020

Ana María Romero Moreno (born 14 June 1987), commonly known as Willy, is a Spanish retired footballer who played as a midfielder. She previously represented several teams in Spain's Primera División, including Valencia CF, FC Barcelona, Sevilla FC, Rayo Vallecano and RCD Espanyol.

== Club career ==
Romero left Espanyol for local rivals FC Barcelona in summer 2013. After moving on to Valencia CF, she signed for Ajax in July 2016.

== Honours ==
Rayo Vallecano

- Primera División: 2008–09, 2009–10
- Copa de la Reina: 2008

RCD Espanyol

- Copa de la Reina: 2012

FC Barcelona

- Primera División: 2013–14, 2014–15
- Copa de la Reina: 2014
- Copa Catalunya: 2014

AFC Ajax

- Eredivisie: 2016–17, 2017–18
- KNVB Cup: 2017, 2018

== International career ==
She is a member of the Spanish national team and a holder of the 2004 Under-19 European Championship. In November 2011, medical student Romero scored a late goal to force a 2–2 draw with Germany in Motril.

=== International goals ===
#	Date	Venue	Opponent	Score	Result	Competition
1.	3 May 2008	La Ciudad del Fútbol, Las Rozas de Madrid	Belarus	2–0	6–1	UEFA Women's Euro 2009 qualifying
2.	3 May 2008	La Ciudad del Fútbol, Las Rozas de Madrid	Belarus	6–1	6–1	UEFA Women's Euro 2009 qualifying
3.	19 September 2009	Centenary Stadium, Ta' Qali	Malta	0–6	0–13	UEFA Women's Euro 2009 qualifying
4.	19 September 2009	Centenary Stadium, Ta' Qali	Malta	0–11	0–13	UEFA Women's Euro 2009 qualifying
5.	19 September 2009	Centenary Stadium, Ta' Qali	Malta	0–13	0–13	UEFA Women's Euro 2009 qualifying
6.	24 November 2011	Estadio Escribano Castilla, Motril	Germany	2–2	2–2	UEFA Women's Euro 2013 qualifying
7.	15 February 2012	San Lázaro, Santiago de Compostela	Austria	4–1	4–1	Friendly

== Personal life ==
She is in a relationship with Merel van Dongen. They are engaged since December 2021.
