= Eli Artola =

Spanish footballer

Personal information
- Full name: Elizabeth Artola Lakarra
- Date of birth: 25 October 1967 (age 59)
- Place of birth: San Sebastián
- Position: Striker

Senior career*
Years	Team	Apps	(Gls)
1981–1989	Oiartzun		
1989–1992	Atletico de Madrid		

International career
1986–1992	Spain	18	(4)
1987	Spain XI	1	(1)
- * Club domestic league appearances and goals

Elizabeth Artola is a Spanish former international football forward who played for Oiartzun. She has played for the national team.

== Early life ==
Artola started playing football at school.

== Club career ==
Artola started her career with Oiartzun. She helped establish the women's team with her father, Inaki Artola. After that, she helped Oiartzun win the División de Honor and the Copa de la Reina twice.

== International career ==
Artola played for the Spain women's national football team.

== International goals ==
No.	Date	Venue	Opponent	Score	Result	Competition
1.	19 December 1987	Aranjuez, Spain	Belgium	1–0	1–0	1989 European Competition for Women's Football qualifying
2.	6 March 1988	Palma del Río, Spain	France	1–3	1–3	1989 European Competition for Women's Football qualifying
3.	20 March 1988	Torrent, Spain	Bulgaria	1–0	1–0	1989 European Competition for Women's Football qualifying
4.	10 February 1990	Portici, Italy	Italy	1–3	1–3	UEFA Women's Euro 1991 qualifying

== Honours ==
=== Club ===
Oiartzun

- División de Honor (3)
  - 1991
- Copa de la Reina
  - 1987, 1988
