= Itziar Bakero =

Spanish footballer (born 1969)

Ixiar Bakero
Personal information
- Full name: Ixiar Bakero Escudero
- Date of birth: 24 July 1969 (age 57)
- Place of birth: Goizueta, Navarre
- Position: Attacking midfielder

Youth career
- 1980–1982: Añorga KKE

Senior career*
Years	Team	Apps	(Gls)
1982–1996	Añorga KKE		

International career
1987–1995	Spain	23	(7)
- * Club domestic league appearances and goals

Itziar Bakero Escudero (born 24 July 1969) is a Spanish former footballer who played as a midfielder for Añorga KKE in the former División de Honor, with which she won three championships and three national cups. She was a member of the Spain women's national team through the late 1980s and the first half of the 1990s.

Her brother José María was also an international footballer.

== Honours ==
Añorga KKE

- Primera División: 1991–92, 1994–95, 1995–96
- Copa de la Reina: 1990, 1991, 1993

== International goals ==
#	Date	Venue	Opponent	Score	Result	Competition
1.	25 November 1989	El Maulí, Antequera	Denmark	1–0	1–3	1991 UEFA Women's Championship qualifying
2.	22 March 1990	Dalymount Park, Dublin	Republic of Ireland	0–1	0–1	1993 UEFA Women's Championship qualifying
3.	20 March 1994	Nou Estadi, Palamós	Slovenia		17–0	1995 UEFA Women's Championship qualifying
4.	20 March 1994	Nou Estadi, Palamós	Slovenia		17–0	1995 UEFA Women's Championship qualifying
5.	24 April 1994	Municipal Josep Otero, Tortosa	Belgium		4–0	1995 UEFA Women's Championship qualifying
6.	29 May 1994	Arena Zmagovalcev, Naklo	Slovenia	0–4	0–8	1995 UEFA Women's Championship qualifying
7.	29 May 1994	Arena Zmagovalcev, Naklo	Slovenia	0–7	0–8	1995 UEFA Women's Championship qualifying
