= CF Motril =

Association football club in Spain

Motril
- Full name: Club de Fútbol Motril
- Nicknames: La Blanquiazul (The Blue and White)
- Founded: 2012; 14 years ago
- Stadium: Escribano Castilla
- Capacity: 5,400
- President: Juanmi González Salvador
- Head coach: Raúl Barroso
- League: Tercera Federación – Group 9
- 2025–26: Tercera Federación – Group 9, 2nd of 18
- Website: http://cfmotril.com/
Home colours	Away colours

Club de Fútbol Motril is a Spanish football club based in Motril, Granada, in the autonomous community of Andalusia (Spain). Founded in 2012 as a replacement for dissolved Motril CF, it plays in Tercera Federación – Group 9, holding home matches at Estadio Escribano Castilla, with a capacity of 5,400 seats.

== History ==
In 2012, after the disappearance of Motril CF, CF Motril was created. This begins to compete from the lower leagues of Spanish football, but achieved a meteoric rise. So much so that in the first four seasons of its existence it achieved four consecutive promotions, and already in the 2019–20 Season, it tried to make the jump to Second Division B through the play-offs, in which it would fail, eliminated by El Ejido in the semifinals by a score of 2-3.

In the 2020–21 season, it played the first edition of the RFAF Cup that gives access to the RFEF Cup, it could have also given a ticket to play the Copa del Rey, but they lost in the quarterfinals against Antequera CF. In 2020 they created the CF Motril Academy or CF Motril "B", which achieved its first promotion in the 2020–21 season to Segunda Andaluza. And in the year 2021 Nike noticed this club and became its official sponsor, apart from many others.

== Season to season ==
Season	Tier	Division	Place	Copa del Rey
2012–13	8	2ª Prov.	1st	
2013–14	7	1ª Prov.	2nd	
2014–15	6	2ª And.	1st	
2015–16	5	1ª And.	1st	
2016–17	4	3ª	5th	
2017–18	4	3ª	6th	
2018–19	4	3ª	6th	
2019–20	4	3ª	3rd	
2020–21	4	3ª	8th / 3rd	
2021–22	5	3ª RFEF	6th	
2022–23	5	3ª Fed.	7th	
2023–24	5	3ª Fed.	6th	
2024–25	5	3ª Fed.	3rd	
2025–26	5	3ª Fed.	2nd	
2026–27	5	3ª Fed.		

- 5 seasons in Tercera División
- 6 seasons in Tercera Federación/Tercera División RFEF
