= Victoria Hernández (footballer) =

Spanish footballer (born 1958)

Victoria Hernández (born 1958 in Villaverde, Madrid) is a Spanish former footballer who played as a left winger. She is recognized as the first female footballer in Spain to sign a professional contract. She also played in the first official match of the Spain women's national team 1983, having previously played for the unofficial team since 1971. In a deviation from her usual position, she played as a goalkeeper during an 8–1 loss in 1971 against Italy in Turin, as the team's goalkeeper was unable to start due to anxiety caused by the sizeable crowd in attendance.

== International goals ==
No.	Date	Venue	Opponent	Score	Result	Competition
1.	12 May 1984	Zürich, Switzerland	Switzerland	1–0	1–0	Friendly
2.	3 November 1985	Palma, Spain	Italy	2–1	2–3	1987 European Competition for Women's Football qualifying
3.	10 June 1985	Solothurn, Switzerland	Switzerland	2–0	3–0	1987 European Competition for Women's Football qualifying
4.	10 June 1985	Solothurn, Switzerland	Switzerland	3–0	3–0	1987 European Competition for Women's Football qualifying
5.	11 October 1987	Sofia, Bulgaria	Bulgaria	1–0	1–1	1989 European Competition for Women's Football qualifying
