= Yolanda García =

Spanish taekwondo practitioner

Personal information
- Nationality: Spanish
- Born: 18 January 1971 (age 55) Andorra

Sport
- Sport: Taekwondo
Medal record
Representing Spain
Women's taekwondo
World Championships
Silver medal – second place	1995 Manila	Heavyweight
European Championships
Gold medal – first place	1994 Zagreb	+70 kg

Yolanda García (born 18 January 1971) is a Spanish taekwondo practitioner, born in Andorra. She won a silver medal in heavyweight at the 1995 World Taekwondo Championships, and a gold medal at the 1994 European Taekwondo Championships.
