= Itziar Okariz =

Basque artist

Itziar Okariz (also spelled Itziar Ocáriz, born 1965) is a Basque/Spanish artist based in New York City and San Sebastián.

== Biography ==
Itziar Okariz was born in San Sebastián and studied painting and sculpture at the Universidad del País Vasco.

== Work ==
Her work is usually based on photographs or film installations and performance, in forms inspired by the Situationists. She is often identified as a feminist artist, although she does not like the label because it contextualizes her work too narrowly. According to Javier Hontoria of Artforum, she "has always focused on a performativity that also examines the ties between landscape and architecture, sign and ritual, or sexuality and territory. In her quest to render the self, her practice took a turn to the verbal over the spatial, privileging language over the body... Much of Okariz's practice is built upon small linguistic units and signs that produce meaning through emphatic reiteration."

She has exhibited works in many countries in Europe and in the United States.

To Pee In Public And Private Spaces

Itziar Okariz
- Born: 1965 (age 60–61)
- Education: Universidad del País Vasco
- Known for: Performance
- Notable work: Faces (1999); Irrintzi (2007); Publication Itziar Okariz (2001); To Pee In Public And Private Spaces (2000-2004)

In her own note she describes the artwork, "to execute the action as described in the title (location included) or, one could say, contained in the title." She usually tries to do it while there is little movement in the streets because of the illegal aspect of the action, and she "find[s] it interesting to delineate what is legally allowed and what is not, as a definition of the individual in society." She has chosen a number of different locations, "always with the aim of expanding the spectrum of meanings."

Selection of work

- Faces (video installation, 1999)
- Publication Itziar Okariz (Vitoria-Gasteiz : Servicio Central de Publicaciones del Gobierno Vasco, 2001)
- Mear en espacios públicos o privados / Peeing in Public or Private Spaces
- Trepar edificios
- "Irrintzi" (Exhibition Chacun à son goût, Guggenheim Museum Bilbao, 2007)

== Awards ==
- 1995: 1st prize in Gure Artea of the Basque Country
- 1993: 3rd prize in the Certamen de Artistas Noveles in San Sebastian
