= Dominique Provost =

French association football player (1961-)

Personal information
- Date of birth: 15 June 1961 (age 65)
- Place of birth: Caen, France
- Position: Midfielder

International career
Years	Team	Apps	(Gls)
1983-1991	France	5	(1)

Dominique Provost (born 15 June 1961) is a French former footballer who played as a forward for Football Club féminin condéen of the Division 1 Féminine.
