= Itziar Gurrutxaga =

Spanish footballer (born 1977)

Personal information
- Full name: Itziar Gurrutxaga Bengoetxea
- Date of birth: 4 April 1977 (age 49)
- Place of birth: Elgoibar, Basque Country
- Height: 1.63 m (5 ft 4 in)
- Position: Central midfielder

Senior career*
Years	Team	Apps	(Gls)
1993–1999	CD Elgoibar		
1999–2002	Eibartarrak FT		
2002–2008	Athletic Bilbao	125	(28)

International career
1998–2008	Spain	37	(3)
2006–2008	Basque Country	2	(0)
- * Club domestic league appearances and goals

Itziar Gurrutxaga Bengoetxea is a Spanish former footballer who played as a central midfielder for Athletic Bilbao.

She earned 37 caps scored 3 goals for the Spain women's national football team from 1998 to 2008.

== Honours ==
Athletic Club

- Superliga Femenina (4): 2002-03, 2003-04, 2004-05, 2006-07.
