= Estadio Escribano Castilla =

Multi-purpose stadium, in Motril, Spain

Coordinates: 36°45′15.99″N 3°30′46.00″W

Estadio Municipal Escribano Castilla de Motril is a multi-purpose stadium in Motril, Spain, with a capacity of 4,400 people. It is used mostly for football matches, and is the home ground of CF Motril.

On 24 November, 2011, a qualifying match for the UEFA Women's Euro 2013 between Spain and Germany was held in the stadium.
