= Estadi Palamós Costa Brava =

Stadium in Palamós, Catalonia, Spain

Palamós Costa Brava
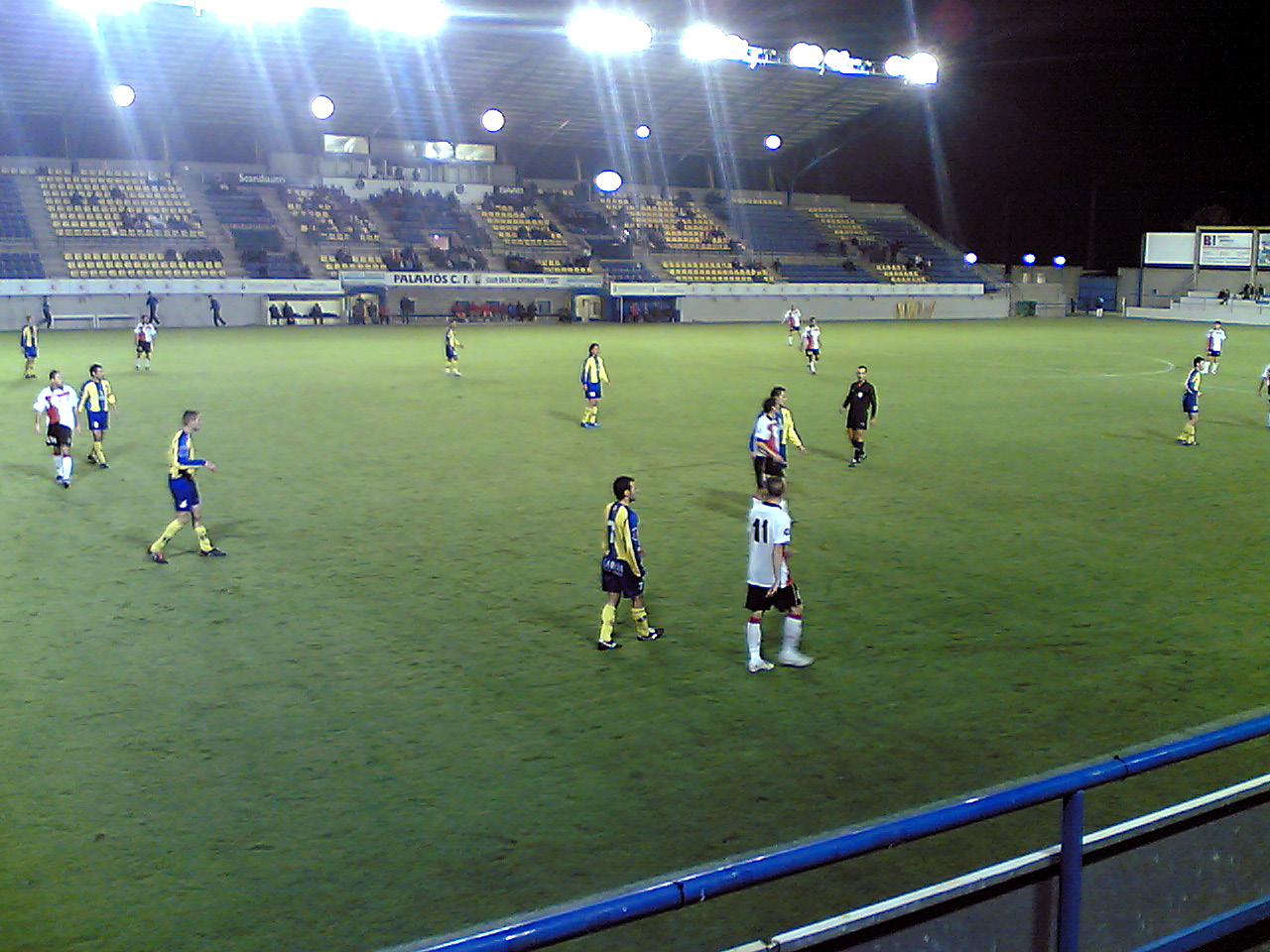
- Interactive map of Palamós Costa Brava
- Full name: Estadi Municipal Palamós Costa Brava
- Former names: Nou Estadi de Palamós (1989–2014)
- Location: Palamós, Spain
- Coordinates: 41°51′13″N 3°07′17″E
- Capacity: 3,724
- Surface: Grass
- Field size: 105x65m

Construction
- Opened: 1989

Tenants
- Palamós CF (1989–); UE Llagostera (2014–2017); UE Costa Brava (2021–2022); UE Cornellà (present)

The Estadi Municipal Palamós Costa Brava is a multi-use stadium located in Palamós, Catalonia, Spain. It is currently used for football matches and is the home stadium of Palamós CF.

== History ==
Palamós Costa Brava was inaugurated on 29 August 1989 under the name of Nou Estadi Municipal de Palamós, being the new home stadium of Palamós CF and replacing Camp de Cervantes. Its first match was a 2–1 friendly win against neighbours FC Barcelona on the same day.

The stadium's first competitive match took charge on 10 September, a 1–1 draw against Levante UD for the Segunda División championship. This was the club's most successful period, as it remained in the second level for six consecutive campaigns.

On 7 July 2014 the stadium was named as the new home ground of UE Llagostera for the following five seasons, as the club's stadium, Estadi Municipal de Llagostera, didn't meet the LFP criteria. On 2 August, it was renamed to Estadi Municipal Palamós Costa Brava.

In the 2015 summer, the stadium was renovated by adding seats in all the stands, and had its capacity reduced to 3,724 spectators. On 27 July 2021, Llagostera announced that the club would play in the stadium again for the ensuing campaign; four days later, the club changed name to UE Costa Brava.

== International Football Matches ==
Date	Competition	Team	Res	Team
11 Sep 2018	International Friendly	United Arab Emirates	3-0	Laos
