= List of Spain national football team captains =

== Men's team ==
=== Captain chronology ===
The captains of the Spain men's national team since 1913:

- Source

Name	Span	Tournaments as captain	Reserve captains
Juan Arzuaga	1913		
Mariano Arrate	1920–1923	Summer Olympics 1920	José María Belauste (1920); Pedro Vallana (1920); Paulino Alcántara (1921–22); Josep Samitier (1922–23)
Paulino Alcántara	1923		
Manuel Meana	1924		
Pedro Vallana	1924-1928	Summer Olympics 1924; Tour of Austria-Hungary (1925); Summer Olympics 1928	Josep Samitier (1924–25); José María Peña (1925); Ricardo Zamora (1927–28); José Maria Yermo (1928)
Ricardo Zamora	1928–1936	World Cup 1934 qualifying World Cup 1934	José María Peña (1930); Josep Samitier (1931); Jacinto Quincoces (1934–36)
Luis Regueiro	1936		
Guillermo Gorostiza	1941		
Ramón Gabilondo	1942	Tour of the Axis (1942)	
Juan Antonio Ipiña	1945–1946		
César	1947		
Herrerita	1947		
Epi Fernández	1948–1949		
Ignacio Eizaguirre	1949–1950	World Cup 1950 qualifying World Cup 1950	Agustín Gaínza (1950); Telmo Zarra (1950)
Agustín Gaínza	1950–1955	Tour of the Southern Cone (1953); World Cup 1954 qualifying	Antonio Puchades (1954)
Antoni Ramallets	1955		
Marcelino Campanal	1955		
Joan Segarra	1955–1956; 1959–1962	Tour of the British Islands (1955); European Nations Cup 1960 qualifying World Cup 1962 qualifying Tour of South America (1960); World Cup 1962	Marcelino Campanal (1957); Luis Suárez (1960); Antoni Ramallets (1960–61); László Kubala (1961); Paco Gento (1961–62); Enrique Collar (1961)
Jesús Garay	1957–1958	World Cup 1958 qualifying Franco-German Tour (1958)	José María Zárraga (1958)
Enrique Collar	1962–1963	European Nations Cup 1964 qualifying	Feliciano Rivilla (1963)
Paco Gento	1963; 1965–1969	World Cup 1966; Euro 1968 qualifying World Cup 1970 qualifying	Ignacio Zoco (1966–69); Jesús Glaría (1966–69); Severino Reija (1966–67); Gallego (1968–69); Pirri (1968)
Ferran Olivella	1964–1965	European Nations Cup 1964; World Cup 1966 qualifying	
Amancio	1970–1974	Euro 1972 qualifying World Cup 1974 qualifying	Luis Aragonés (1970); Pirri (1971); Gallego (1972); Isacio Calleja (1972); Luis Suárez (1972); Tonono (1972); Juan Sol (1973); Txetxu Rojo (1973); José Claramunt (1973)
José Claramunt	1974–1975		Carles Rexach (1974); Juan Manuel Asensi (1978)
Pirri	1975–1978	Euro 1976 qualifying World Cup 1978 qualifying World Cup 1978	Juan Sol (1976); Quini (1978); Juan Manuel Asensi (1978)
Juan Manuel Asensi	1978–1980	Euro 1980 qualifying Euro 1980	Vicente del Bosque (1978–80); Eugenio Leal (1978); Quini (1979); Migueli (1979); Dani (1980); Carlos Santillana (1980)
Luis Arconada	1980–1985	Tour of South America (1981); World Cup 1982; Tour of European Central (1984); Euro 1984 qualifying Euro 1984	José Antonio Camacho (1983–1984)
Rafael Gordillo	1985		
José Antonio Camacho	1985–1988	World Cup 1986 qualifying World Cup 1986; Euro 1988 qualifying Euro 1988	Víctor Muñoz (1985–88); Rafael Gordillo (1987–88)
Emilio Butragueño	1988–1992	World Cup 1990 qualifying Friuli-Venezia Giulia Tour (1990); World Cup 1990; Euro 1992 qualifying World Cup 1994 qualifying	Andoni Zubizarreta (1989–91); Manolo (1990); José Mari Bakero (1992); Míchel (1992)
José Mari Bakero	1992–1994	World Cup 1994 qualifying	Andoni Zubizarreta (1993–94); Txiki Begiristain (1993); Fernando Hierro (1993)
Andoni Zubizarreta	1994–1998	World Cup 1994; Euro 1996 qualifying Euro 1996; World Cup 1998 qualifying World Cup 1998	Fernando Hierro (1994–96); Miguel Ángel Nadal (1994); Abelardo Fernández (1998)
Fernando Hierro	1998–2002	Euro 2000 qualifying Euro 2000; World Cup 2002 qualifying World Cup 2002	Sergi Barjuán (1998–2001); Luis Enrique (1999); Abelardo Fernández (2000–01); Miguel Ángel Nadal (2002)
Raúl	2002–2006	Euro 2004 qualifying Euro 2004; World Cup 2006 qualifying World Cup 2006	Gaizka Mendieta (2002); Santiago Cañizares (2003); Joseba Etxeberria (2004); Iker Casillas (2004–06); Fernando Torres (2005)
Iker Casillas	2006–2016	Euro 2008 qualifying Euro 2008; Conference Cup 2009; World Cup 2010 qualifying World Cup 2010; Euro 2012 qualifying Tour of America (2011); Euro 2012; Conference Cup 2013; World Cup 2014 qualifying World Cup 2014; Euro 2016 qualifying Tour of Southern Europe (2016); Euro 2016	David Albelda (2006); Carles Puyol (2007–13); Xavi (2007–14); Joaquín (2007); Xabi Alonso (2008–12); Sergio Ramos (2010–16); Fernando Torres (2012); David Villa (2012); Andrés Iniesta (2014); Cesc Fàbregas (2015–16)
Sergio Ramos	2016–2021	World Cup 2018 qualifying World Cup 2018; Nations League A 2018–19; Euro 2020 qualifying Nations League A 2020–21	David Silva (2016); Andrés Iniesta (2017–18); Isco (2018); Raúl Albiol (2019); Sergio Busquets (2020–21); Koke (2020)
Sergio Busquets	2021–2022	Euro 2020; Nations League A 2022–23; Nations League Finals 2021; World Cup 2022 qualifying World Cup 2022	Marc Cucurella (2021); Jordi Alba (2021); César Azpilicueta (2021); Koke (2021–22); Álvaro Morata (2022)
Jordi Alba	2023	Nations League Finals 2023; Euro 2024 qualifying	Álvaro Morata (2023); Rodri (2023)
Álvaro Morata	2023–2025	Euro 2024 qualifying Euro 2024; Nations League A 2024–25; Nations League Finals 2025; World Cup 2026 qualifying	Jesús Navas (2023–2024); Rodri (2024); Mikel Oyarzabal (2024); Dani Carvajal (2024); Unai Simón (2025)
Rodri Hernández	2026–	2026 FIFA World Cup; Nations League A 2026–27	Ferran Torres (2026); Unai Simón (2026)

=== Captains by appearances as captain ===
Caps as of 15 November 2026

#	Player	Spain career	Caps as captain	Total caps	First captaincy	Age
1	(Community of Madrid) Iker Casillas	2000–2016	104	167	3 September 2004	23 years, 3 months and 14 days
2	(Andalusia) Sergio Ramos	2005–2021	54	180	3 June 2010	24 years, 2 months and 4 days
3	(Basque Country (autonomous community)) Andoni Zubizarreta	1985–1998	50	126	11 October 1989	27 years, 11 months and 15 days
4	(Basque Country (autonomous community)) Luis Arconada	1977–1985	48	68	24 September 1980	26 years, 2 months and 29 days
5	(Castile and León) Raúl González	1996–2006	42	102	18 August 1999	22 years, 1 month and 22 days
6	(Andalusia) Fernando Hierro	1989–2002	32	89	2 June 1993	25 years, 2 months and 10 days
7	(Community of Madrid) Emilio Butragueño	1983–1992	31	69	14 September 1988	25 years, 1 month and 23 days
8	(Catalonia) Ricardo Zamora	1920–1936	24	46	17 April 1927	26 years, 2 months and 27 days
8	(Region of Murcia) José Antonio Camacho	1975–1988	24	81	21 December 1983	28 years, 6 months and 13 days
10	(Catalonia) Sergio Busquets	2009–2022	20	143	7 October 2020	32 years, 2 months and 21 days
11	Agustín Gaínza	1945–1955	19	33	2 April 1950	27 years, 10 months and 5 days
11	(Community of Madrid) Álvaro Morata	2014–2025	19	87	26 March 2022	29 years, 5 months and 3 days
13	Pirri	1966–1978	18	41	17 October 1968	23 years, 6 months and 6 days
14	(Community of Madrid) Rodri Hernández	2018–	16	74	28 March 2023	26 years, 9 months and 6 days
15	(Province of Barcelona) Joan Segarra	1951–1962	15	25	27 November 1955	28 years and 12 days
15	Francisco Gento	1955–1969	15	43	11 June 1961	27 years, 7 months and 21 days
17	Amancio Amaro	1962–1974	14	42	11 February 1970	30 years, 3 months and 26 days
17	Juan Manuel Asensi	1969–1980	14	41	24 May 1978	28 years, 8 months and 1 day
19	(Basque Country (autonomous community)) Unai Simón	2020–	12	71	23 March 2025	27 years, 9 months and 12 days
20	(Province of Barcelona) Ferran Olivella	1957–1965	10	18	11 March 1964	27 years, 8 months and 17 days
20	(Catalonia) Xavi Hernández	2001–2016	10	133	22 August 2007	26 years, 6 months and 28 days
22	Jesús Garay	1953–1965	9	29	10 March 1957	26 years and 6 months
23	(Province of Barcelona) Josep Samitier	1920–1931	8	21	17 December 1922	20 years, 10 months and 16 days
24	(Asturias) Abelardo Fernández	1991–2001	7	54	3 June 1998	28 years, 1 month and 15 days
25	Epi Fernández	1941–1949	6	15	21 March 1948	28 years, 10 months and 27 days
25	Enrique Collar	1955–1963	6	16	13 November 1961	27 years and 21 days
25	José Claramunt	1968–1975	6	23	21 October 1973	27 years, 3 months and 5 days
25	(Andalusia) Rafael Gordillo	1978–1988	6	75	26 May 1985	28 years, 3 months and 2 days
25	(Basque Country (autonomous community)) Xabier Alonso	2003–2014	6	113	18 June 2008	26 years, 6 months and 24 days
30	Pedro Vallana	1920–1928	5	12	2 September 1920	22 years, 9 months and 4 days
30	(Aragon) Víctor Muñoz	1981–1988	5	60	18 March 1985	28 years and 3 days
30	(Navarre) José Mari Bakero	1987–1994	5	30	9 September 1992	29 years, 6 months and 29 days
30	(Community of Madrid) Koke Resurrección	2013–2022	5	69	11 November 2020	28 years, 10 months and 3 days
30	(Catalonia) Jordi Alba	2011–2023	5	93	14 June 2021	32 years, 2 months and 24 days
35	Jacinto Quincoces	1928–1936	4	25	1 June 1934	28 years, 10 months and 15 days
35	Ignacio Eizaguirre	1945–1952	4	18	12 June 1949	28 years, 7 months and 5 days
35	(Province of Barcelona) Antoni Ramallets	1950–1961	4	35	18 May 1955	30 years, 10 months and 14 days
35	Jesús Glaría	1962–1969	4	20	23 October 1966	24 years, 9 months and 21 days
35	Severino Reija	1962–1967	4	20	7 December 1966	28 years and 12 days
35	(Balearic Islands) Miguel Ángel Nadal	1991–2002	4	62	10 June 1994	27 years, 10 months and 13 days
35	(Catalonia) Sergi Barjuan	1994–2002	4	56	18 November 1998	26 years, 10 months and 21 days
35	(Catalonia) Carles Puyol	2000–2013	4	100	17 October 2007	29 years, 5 months and 4 days
43	José María Belauste	1920	3	3	28 August 1920	31 years, 3 months and 13 days
43	Mariano Arrate	1920–1923	3	6	29 August 1920	28 years and 17 days
43	Paulino Alcántara	1921–1923	3	5	9 October 1921	24 years and 1 day
43	Guillermo Gorostiza	1930–1941	3	19	12 January 1941	31 years, 10 months and 28 days
43	Ramón Gabilondo	1941–1942	3	5	15 March 1942	29 years
43	Juan Antonio Ipiña	1936–1946	3	6	11 March 1945	33 years, 6 months and 16 days
43	Ignacio Zoco	1961–1969	3	25	20 July 1966	26 years, 11 months and 20 days
43	Francisco Gallego	1966–1973	3	36	2 May 1968	24 years, 1 month and 28 days
43	Quini	1970–1982	3	35	29 March 1978	28 years, 6 months and 6 days
43	(Castilla–La Mancha) Andrés Iniesta	2006–2018	3	131	12 October 2014	30 years, 5 months and 1 day
43	(Catalonia) Francesc Fàbregas	2006–2016	3	110	31 March 2015	27 years, 10 months and 27 days
54	José María Peña	1925–1930	2	21	4 October 1925	30 years, 5 months and 15 days
54	José María Yermo	1927–1928	2	5	1 June 1928	24 years, 11 months and 11 days
54	Marcelo Campanal	1952–1957	2	11	19 June 1955	23 years, 4 months and 6 days
54	Luis Regueiro	1927–1936	2	25	26 April 1936	27 years, 9 months and 25 days
54	Luis Suárez	1957–1972	2	32	26 October 1960	25 years, 5 months and 24 days
54	Juan Cruz Sol	1970–1976	2	28	2 May 1973	25 years, 7 months and 19 days
54	Vicente del Bosque	1975–1980	2	18	13 December 1978	27 years, 11 months and 20 days
54	(Basque Country (autonomous community)) Txiki Begiristain	1988–1994	2	22	31 March 1993	28 years, 7 months and 19 days
54	(Asturias) Luis Enrique	1991–2002	2	62	13 November 1999	29 years, 6 months and 5 days
54	(Basque Country (autonomous community)) Gaizka Mendieta	1999–2002	2	40	16 October 2002	28 years, 6 months and 19 days
54	(Community of Madrid) Fernando Torres	2003–2014	2	110	3 September 2005	21 years, 5 months and 14 days
54	(Canary Islands) David Silva	2006–2018	2	125	12 November 2016	30 years, 10 months and 4 days
54	(Andalusia) Jesús Navas	2009–2024	2	56	16 November 2023	37 years, 11 months and 22 days
54	(Basque Country (autonomous community)) Mikel Oyarzabal	2016–	2	65	22 March 2024	26 years, 11 months and 5 days
54	(Valencian Community) Ferrán Torres	2020–	2	67	31 March 2026	26 years, 1 month and 2 days
69	César Rodríguez	1945–1952	1	12	26 January 1947	26 years, 6 months and 20 days
69	Eduardo Herrerita	1934–1947	1	6	2 March 1947	32 years, 7 months and 25 days
69	Telmo Zarra	1945–1951	1	20	16 July 1950	29 years, 5 months and 26 days
69	Antonio Puchades	1949–1954	1	23	14 March 1954	28 years, 9 months and 10 days
69	José María Zárraga	1955–1958	1	8	15 October 1958	28 years and 2 months
69	(Province of Barcelona) László Kubala	1953–1961	1	19	2 April 1961	33 years, 9 months and 23 days
69	Feliciano Rivilla	1960–1965	1	26	13 June 1963	26 years, 9 months and 23 days
69	Luis Aragonés	1965–1972	1	11	10 November 1970	32 years, 3 months and 13 days
69	Isacio Calleja	1961–1972	1	13	23 May 1972	35 years, 5 months and 17 days
69	Tonono Alfonso	1967–1972	1	22	19 October 1972	29 years, 1 month and 24 days
69	Txetxu Rojo	1969–1978	1	18	17 October 1973	26 years, 8 months and 19 days
69	(Province of Barcelona) Carles Rexach	1969–1978	1	15	20 November 1974	27 years, 10 months and 7 days
69	Eugenio Leal	1977–1978	1	14	21 December 1978	24 years, 7 months and 8 days
69	Migueli Bernardo	1974–1980	1	32	14 November 1979	27 years, 10 months and 26 days
69	(Basque Country (autonomous community)) Dani Ruiz-Bazán	1977–1981	1	25	26 March 1980	28 years, 8 months and 27 days
69	Carlos Santillana	1975–1985	1	56	18 June 1980	27 years, 9 months and 26 days
69	(Extremadura) Manolo Sánchez	1988–1992	1	28	26 May 1990	25 years, 4 months and 9 days
69	(Community of Madrid) Míchel	1985–1992	1	66	14 October 1992	29 years, 6 months and 21 days
69	(Castilla–La Mancha) Santiago Cañizares	1993–2006	1	46	30 April 2003	33 years, 4 months and 12 days
69	(Basque Country (autonomous community)) Joseba Etxeberria	1997–2004	1	53	31 March 2004	25 years, 7 months and 25 days
69	(Valencian Community) David Albelda	2001–2008	1	51	11 October 2006	29 years, 1 month and 10 days
69	(Andalusia) Joaquín Sánchez	2002–2008	1	51	6 June 2007	25 years, 10 months and 16 days
69	(Asturias) David Villa	2005–2017	1	98	14 November 2012	30 years, 11 months and 11 days
69	(Andalusia) Isco Alarcón	2013–2025	1	39	18 November 2018	26 years, 6 months and 28 days
69	(Valencian Community) Raúl Albiol	2007–2021	1	58	15 October 2019	33 years, 2 months and 14 days
69	(Catalonia) Marc Cucurella	2021–	1	37	8 June 2021	22 years, 10 months and 17 days
69	(Navarre) César Azpilicueta	2013–2022	1	44	5 September 2021	32 years and 8 days
69	(Community of Madrid) Daniel Carvajal	2014–2025	1	52	5 September 2024	32 years, 7 months and 25 days

== Women's team ==
=== Captain chronology ===
The captains of the Spain women's national team since 1971:

Name	Span	Tournaments as captain	Reserve captains
Conchi Sánchez	1971–1981	Trofeo dell'Adriatico (1972)	?? (1981)
(Asturias) Inmaculada Castañón	1983–1988	1987 European Competition qualifying 1989 European Competition qualifying	Mercedes Gaitero (1984); Ángeles Olmo (1985)
(Catalonia) Francina Pubill	1989–1991	Euro 1991 qualifying	Lola Benito (1989); Eli Artola (1990–91); Ixiar Bakero (1991)
(Navarre) Ixiar Bakero	1991–1994	Euro 1993 qualifying Grand Hotel Varna Tournament 1992; Torneig Internacional Ciutat de Tarragona (1993); Euro 1995 qualifying	
(Basque Country (autonomous community)) Beatriz García	1995–1996	Grand Hotel Varna Tournament 1995; Euro 1997 qualifying Tournament Slovakia (1996)	
(Basque Country (autonomous community)) Arantza del Puerto	1996–2005	(bronze) Euro 1997; World Cup 1999 qualifying Euro 2001 qualifying World Cup 2003 qualifying Euro 2005 quilifying Torneo de Maspalomas (2005)	Judith Corominas (1998); Mar Prieto (1998); Yolanda Mateos (1998–2000)
(Basque Country (autonomous community)) Maider Castillo	2005–2007	World Cup 2007 qualifying	Raquel Cabezón (2007)
(Basque Country (autonomous community)) Itziar Gurrutxaga	2007–2008	Euro 2009 qualifying	Vanesa Gimbert (2008); Melisa Nicolau (2008)
Vanesa Gimbert	2008	Euro 2009 qualifying Play-offs	
Melisa Nicolau	2008–2010	World Cup 2011 qualifying	Sandra Vilanova (2009–10)
Sandra Vilanova	2011–2013	Euro 2013 qualifying Euro 2013	Adriana Martín (2011); Ruth García (2012); Verónica Boquete (2013)
Verónica Boquete	2013–2017	World Cup 2015 qualifying World Cup 2015; Tour of China (2015); Algarve Cup 2017; Euro 2017 qualifying	Ruth García (2014–16); Sonia Bermúdez (2015–17); Marta Torrejón (2015–17); Irene Paredes (2016); Amanda Sampedro (2017)
Marta Torrejón	2017–2019	Euro 2017; World Cup 2019 qualifying Cyprus Cup 2018; Algarve Cup 2019; World Cup 2019	Irene Paredes (2017–19); Amanda Sampedro (2018); Victoria Losada (2018); Alexia Putellas (2019); Virginia Torrecilla (2019)
Irene Paredes	2019–2022; 2024–	Euro 2022 qualifying SheBelieves Cup 2020; World Cup 2023 qualifying Arnold Clark Cup 2022; Euro 2022; (gold) Nations League Finals 2024; Euro 2025 qualifying Summer Olympics 2024; Nations League A 2025; Euro 2025; (gold) Nations League Finals 2025; World Cup 2027 qualifying	Jennifer Hermoso (2020–22); Amanda Sampedro (2020); Dolores Gallardo (2021); Alexia Putellas (2021–26); Ivana Andrés (2021); Olga Carmona (2024); Mariona Caldentey (2024)
Ivana Andrés	2022–2023	Cup of Nations 2023; (gold) World Cup 2023	Esther González (2022–23); Irene Guerrero (2023); Olga Carmona (2023)
Alexia Putellas	2023	Nations League A 2023–24	Irene Paredes (2023); Olga Carmona (2023)

=== Captains by appearances as captain ===
Caps as of 14 October 2026

#	Player	Spain career	Caps as captain	Total caps	First captaincy	Age
1	(Basque Country (autonomous community)) Irene Paredes	2011–	59	129	4 March 2016	24 years and 8 months
2	(Basque Country (autonomous community)) Arantza del Puerto	1990–2005	40	71	27 June 1996	25 years, 3 months and 19 days
3	(Galicia (Spain)) Verónica Boquete	2005–2017	26	56	12 February 2013	25 years, 10 months and 3 days
4	(Catalonia) Marta Torrejón	2007–2019	25	90	21 September 2015	25 years, 6 months and 25 days
5	(Asturias) Inmaculada Castañón	1983–1988	17	17	5 February 1983	23 years, 7 months and 6 days
5	(Catalonia) Sandra Vilanova	2003–2013	17	46	21 November 2009	28 years, 10 months and 20 days
7	(Catalonia) Alexia Putellas	2013–	16	150	1 March 2019	25 years and 25 days
8	(Navarre) Ixiar Bakero	1985–1998	13	23	21 October 1990	21 years, 2 months and 27 days
9	(Valencian Community) Ivana Andrés	2013–2023	11	53	21 October 2021	27 years, 3 months and 8 days
10	(Basque Country (autonomous community)) Beatriz García	1988–1998	10	33	3 April 1995	24 years, 11 months and 11 days
11	(Community of Madrid) Jennifer Hermoso	2012–2025	9	125	5 March 2020	29 years, 9 months and 25 days
12	(Basque Country (autonomous community)) Maider Castillo	1996–2007	8	48	29 September 2005	29 years, 1 month and 26 days
12	(Valencian Community) Ruth García	2005–2016	8	52	21 June 2012	25 years, 2 months and 26 days
14	(Andalusia) Olga Carmona	2021–	7	68	31 July 2023	23 years, 1 month and 19 days
15	(Basque Country (autonomous community)) Itziar Gurrutxaga	1998–2008	6	37	27 Oct 2007	30 years, 6 months and 23 days
16	(Community of Madrid) Amanda Sampedro	2015–2020	5	53	8 April 2017	23 years, 9 months and 13 days
17	(Balearic Islands) Melisa Nicolau	2004–2013	4	31	30 October 2008	24 years, 4 months and 10 days
18	(Basque Country (autonomous community)) Yolanda Mateos	1996–2001	3	26	13 September 1998	26 years, 6 months and 18 days
18	(Andalusia) Esther González	2016–	3	61	11 October 2022	29 years, 10 months and 3 days
20	(Castile and León) Lola Benito	1984–1990	2	20	4 November 1989	24 years, 5 months and 3 days
20	(Catalonia) Francina Pubill	1985–1991	2	18	2 October 2008	29 years, 5 months and 17 days
20	(Basque Country (autonomous community)) Eli Artola	1986–1992	2	18	2 May 1990	22 years, 6 months and 7 days
20	(Catalonia) Judith Corominas	1992–1998	2	25	31 May 1998	31 years, 6 months and 21 days
20	(Basque Country (autonomous community)) Vanesa Gimbert	1997–2010	2	40	2 October 2008	28 years, 5 months and 13 days
20	(Aragon) Adriana Martín	2005–2015	2	39	17 September 2011	23 years, 10 months and 10 days
20	(Community of Madrid) Sonia Bermúdez	2008–2017	2	61	11 February 2015	30 years, 2 months and 27 days
20	(Andalusia) Dolores Gallardo	2013–2022	2	38	13 April 2021	27 years, 10 months and 3 days
20	(Andalusia) Irene Guerrero	2019–2023	2	26	22 February 2023	26 years, 2 months and 10 days
29	(Community of Madrid) Mercedes Gaitero	1983–1988	1	13	17 March 1984	24 years, 8 months and 17 days
29	(Galicia (Spain)) Ángeles Olmo	1983–1988	1	17	27 April 1985	23 years and 7 months
29	(Community of Madrid) Mar Prieto	1985–2000	1	62	14 June 1998	29 years, 3 months and 13 days
29	(Catalonia) Raquel Cabezón	1998–2007	1	38	30 May 2007	28 years, 8 months and 15 days
29	(Catalonia) Vicky Losada	2010–2020	1	65	8 November 2018	27 years, 8 months and 3 days
29	(Balearic Islands) Virginia Torrecilla	2013–2020	1	66	17 May 2019	24 years, 8 months and 8 days
29	(Balearic Islands) Mariona Caldentey	2017–	1	104	29 November 2024	28 years, 8 months and 10 days

== See also ==
- List of Spain men's international footballers
- List of Spain women's international footballers
