= List of Spain women's international footballers =

List of women's football players for the Spanish national team

This is a list of Spain women's international footballers – women's football players who have played for the Spain national football team.

- **Bold** denotes players still playing professional football.
- 2023 – member of the 2023 FIFA World Cup winning team.

== List of players ==
As of 14 October 2026

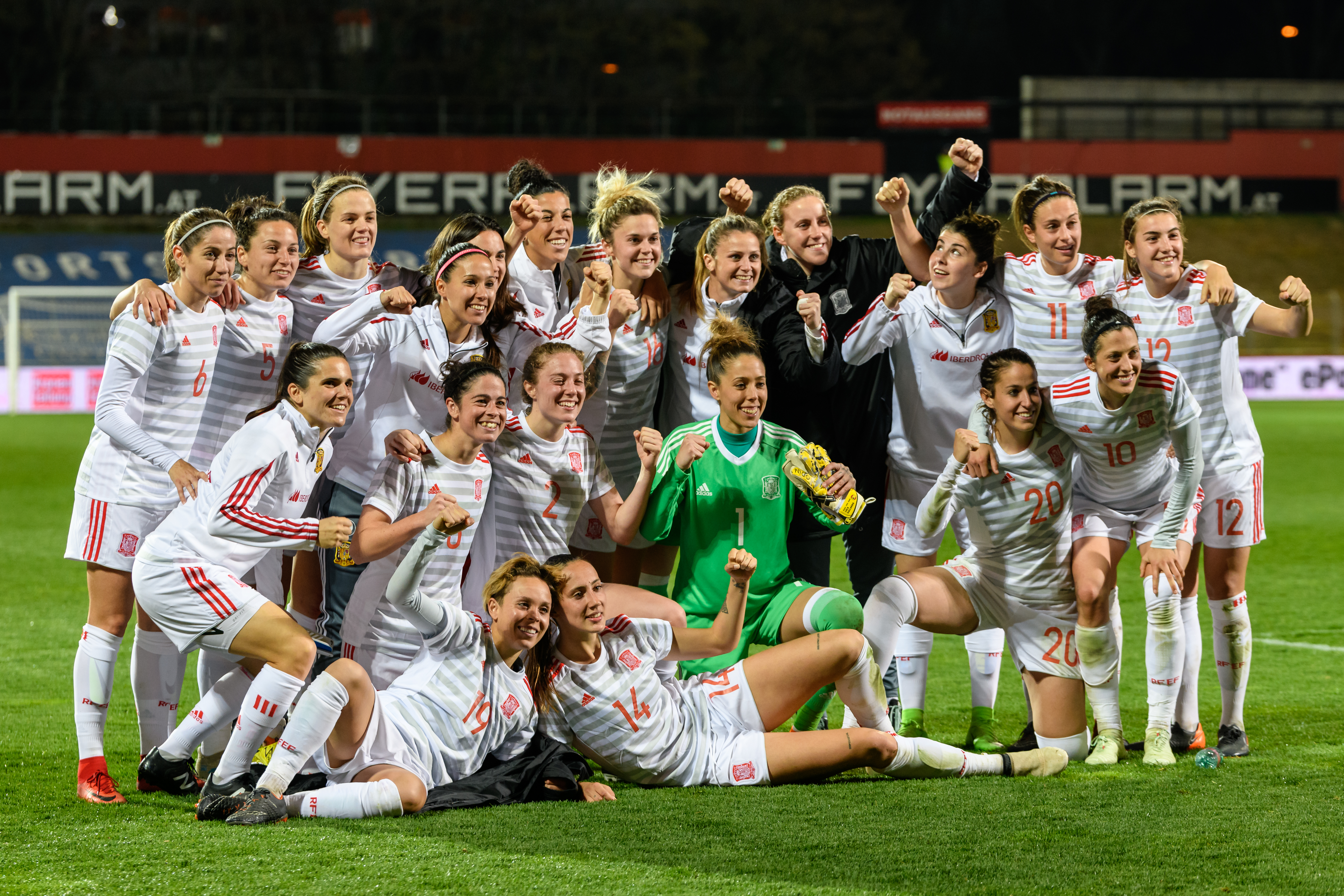
Spanish football team during qualifying for the 2019 World Cup (April 2018)

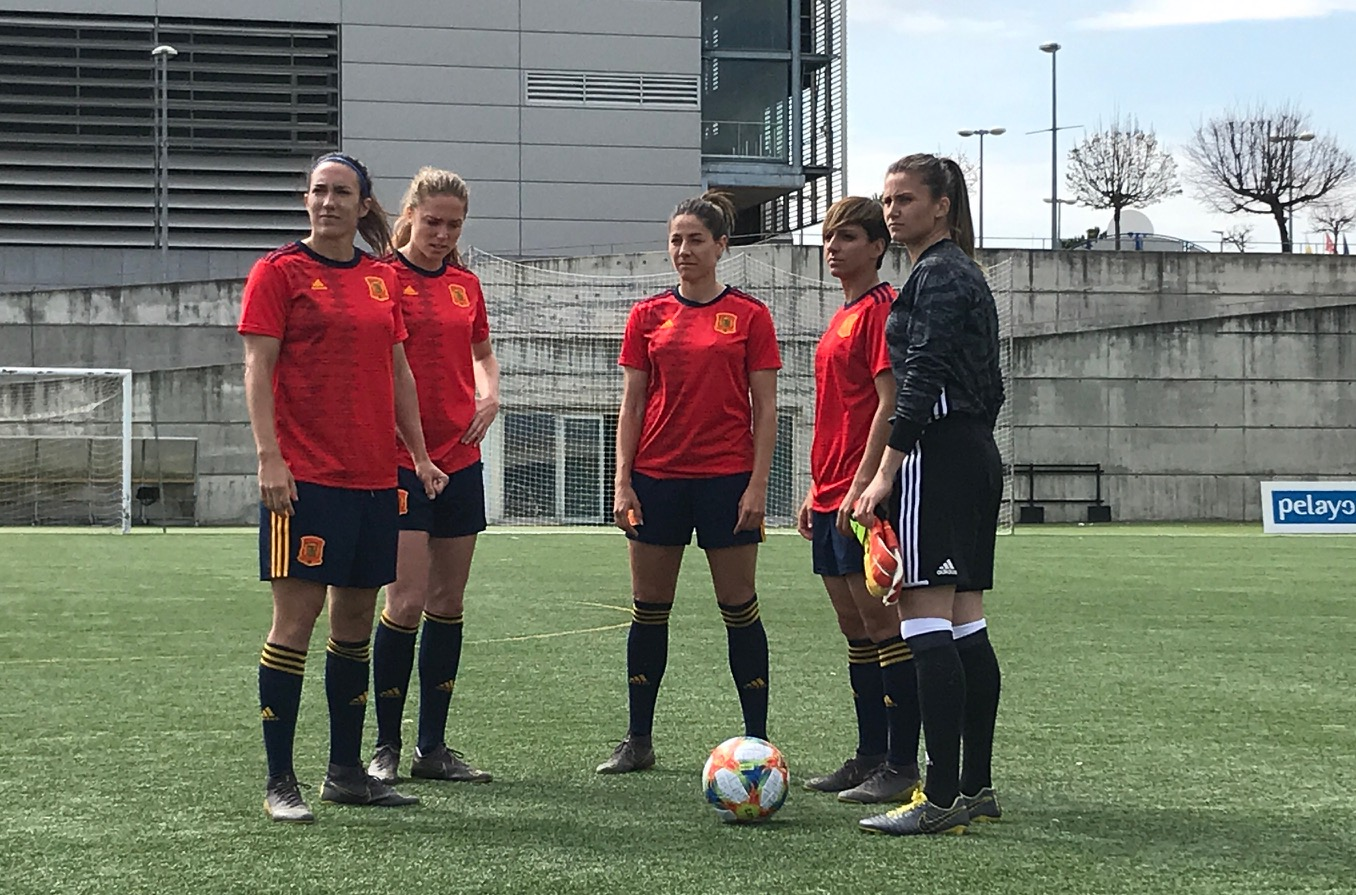
Spanish footballers in training (2019) Silvia Meseguer, Celia Jiménez, Victoria Losada, Marta Corredera and Sandra Paños.

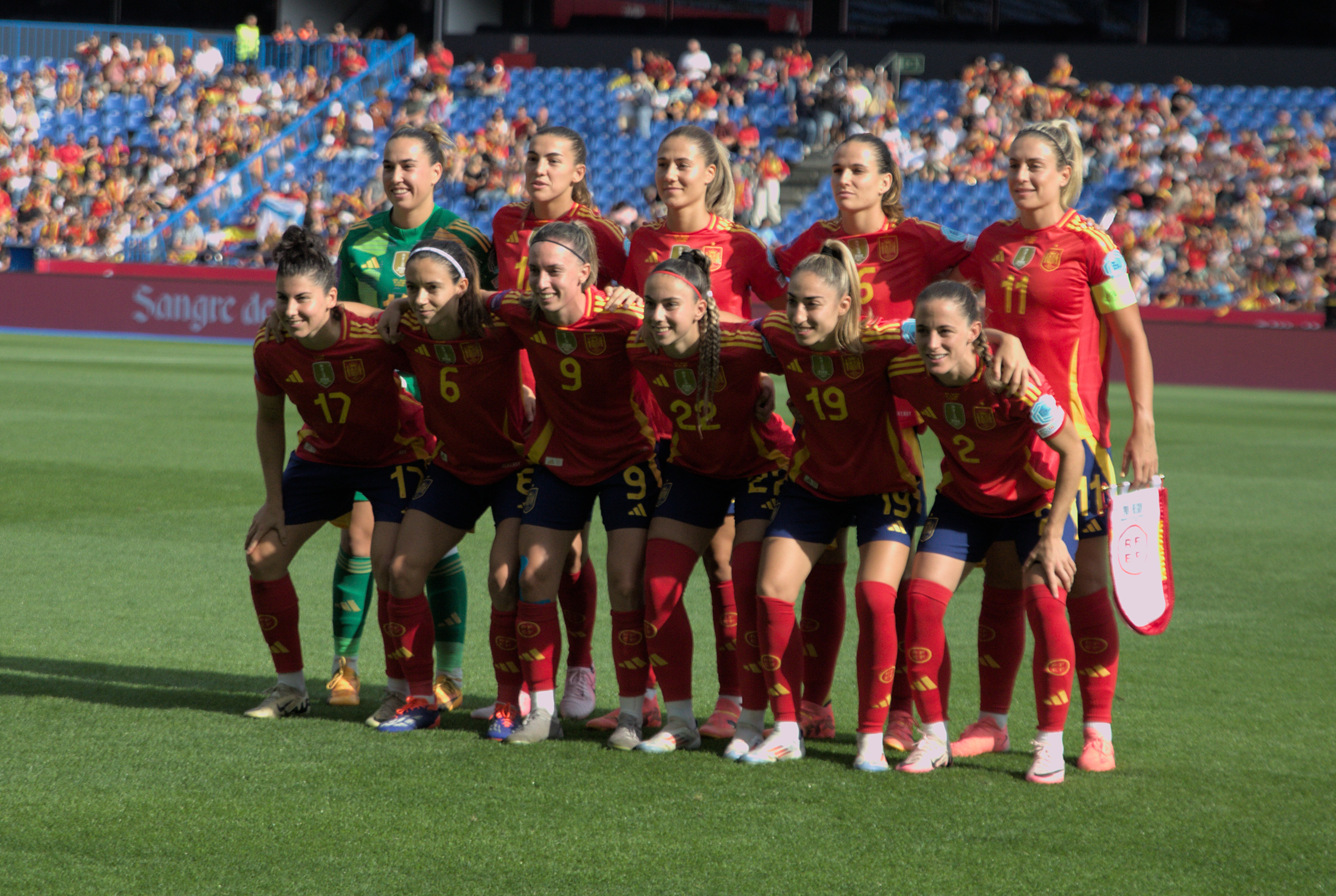
Spain vs Belgium (16 July 2024) in A Coruña. From left to right, standing: Cata Coll, Patri Guijarro, Laia Aleixandri, Laia Codina, Alexia Putellas (cap.); crouched: Lucía García, Aitana Bonmatí, Eva Navarro, Athenea del Castillo, Olga Carmona and Ona Batlle.

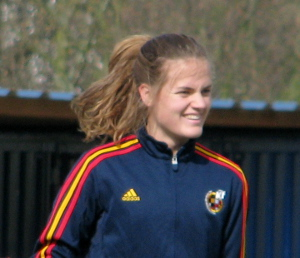
Irene Paredes represented Spain at eight major international tournaments, including four as captain.

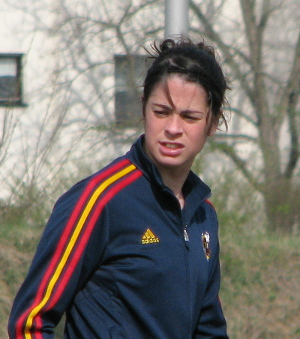
Marta Torrejón (90 caps) surpassed the long-standing record held by Arantza del Puerto, who earned 71 caps for Spain and held the mark for 12 years following her final appearance on 16 February 2005. Torrejón equaled and broke that record on 10 June 2017, setting a new benchmark in the history of the national team.

§	Played on team that won the 2023 FIFA Women's World Cup
**Bold**	Still active for the women's national team
GK	Goalkeeper
DF	Defender
MF	Midfielder
FW	Forward

Spain women's national team footballers with at least 10 caps
Player	Position	Years	Caps	Goals
**Alexia Putellas**	MF	2013–	150	43
**Irene Paredes**	DF	2012–	129	14
Jennifer Hermoso	FW	2011–2025	125	57
**Mariona Caldentey**	FW	2017–	104	31
Marta Torrejón	DF	2007–2019	90	8
Marta Corredera	MF	2013–2021	85	5
**Aitana Bonmatí**	MF	2017–	89	32
**Patricia Guijarro**	MF	2017–2022	80	15
**Ona Batlle**	DF	2019–	77	2
**Athenea del Castillo**	MF	2020–	71	18
Arantza del Puerto	DF	1990–2005	71	0
**Olga Carmona**	DF	2021–	68	3
Silvia Meseguer	MF	2008–2019	67	5
Virginia Torrecilla	MF	2013–2020	66	7
Leila Ouahabi	DF	2016–2025	66	1
Victoria Losada	MF	2010–2020	65	13
Mar Prieto	FW	1989–2000	62	29
**Mapi León**	DF	2016–	62	1
Sonia Bermúdez	FW	2008–2017	61	34
**Esther González**	FW	2016–	61	37
**Lucía García**	FW	2018–	59	13
Verónica Boquete	FW	2005–2017	56	38
Sandra Paños	GK	2012–2022	55	0
Amanda Sampedro	MF	2015–2020	53	11
Ivana Andrés	DF	2015–2023	53	0
Ruth García	DF	2005–2016	52	4
**Salma Paralluelo**	FW	2022–	52	17
**Laia Aleixandri**	DF	2019–	50	3
Maider Castillo	DF	1996–2007	48	0
Erika Vázquez	FW	2003–2016	47	7
Sandra Vilanova	MF	2003–2013	46	2
Ainhoa Tirapu	GK	2007–2015	46	0
**Alba Redondo**	FW	2018–	45	16
Eli Ibarra	MF	2000–2015	44	2
Teresa Abelleira	MF	2020–2025	44	3
Andrea Pereira	DF	2016–2022	42	0
Vanesa Gimbert	MF	1997–2010	40	6
Adriana Martín	FW	2005–2015	39	33
Rosa Castillo	MF	1994–2001	38	4
Raquel Cabezón	MF	1998–2007	38	6
Dolores Gallardo	GK	2013–2022	38	0
Itziar Gurrutxaga	MF	1998–2008	37	3
**Catalina Coll**	GK	2023–	37	0
Silvia Zarza	MF	1996–2003	36	0
Marina Nohalez	DF	1996–2002	35	0
Antonia Is Piñera	DF	1989–1999	34	0
Beatriz García	MF	1988–1998	33	4
**Eva Navarro**	MF	2019–	33	7
Roser Serra	GK	1990–1998	33	0
Olga García	FW	2015–2019	32	5
Melisa Nicolau	DF	2004–2013	31	0
Laura del Río	FW	2000–2008	30	14
Miriam Diéguez	MF	2005–2016	30	0
**Clàudia Pina**	FW	2021–	30	17
Marta Cardona	MF	2019–2023	29	3
**Laia Codina**	DF	2022–	28	2
**Oihane Hernández**	DF	2022–	28	1
Yolanda Mateos	FW	1996–2001	26	8
Elixabete Capa	GK	1998–2005	26	0
Leire Landa	DF	2011–2015	26	0
Mari Paz Vilas	FW	2008–2018	26	15
Irene Guerrero	MF	2019–2023	26	5
**María Isabel Rodríguez**	GK	2021–	26	0
Judith Corominas	DF	1992–1998	25	0
Priscila Borja	FW	2010–2015	25	6
Celia Jiménez	DF	2014–2019	25	0
**María Méndez**	DF	2022–	24	2
Itziar Bakero	MF	1987–1995	23	7
Sheila García	MF	2019–2025	23	1
**Vicky López**	MF	2024–	23	9
Natalia Pablos	FW	2005–2015	22	13
Bárbara Latorre	FW	2016–2021	22	1
Begoña Jauregi	DF	1989–1996	21	0
Lola Benito	MF	1984–1990	20	0
Marta Moreno	DF	2001–2006	20	0
Amaiur Sarriegi	FW	2021–2024	20	13
Auxi Jiménez	FW	1996–2002	19	6
Eli Artola	FW	1984–1992	18	4
Milagros Esteban	MF	1983–1988	18	2
Nahikari García	FW	2018–2022	18	3
Geli Olmo	DF	1983–1990	18	0
Marina Torras	DF	1996–2000	18	2
Inmaculada Castañón	MF	1983–1988	17	0
Montserrat González	MF	1983–1990	17	0
Francina Pubil	DF	1983–1990	17	1
Montserrat Sirgo	MF	1993–1997	17	3
Alicia Fuentes	MF	1997–2002	16	1
Merce González	MF	1988–1994	16	3
Ana Ruiz Mitxelena	GK	1984–1988	15	0
Melanie Serrano	DF	2009–2016	15	0
Maite Oroz	MF	2020–2025	15	4
**Jana Fernández**	DF	2023–	15	0
**Fiamma Benítez**	MF	2022–	15	2
Saray García	MF	2002–2008	14	0
Yolanda García	MF	1983–1988	14	2
Alexandra López	DF	2008–2017	14	0
Àngels Parejo	FW	1988–1999	14	5
Chabe Benito	DF	2005–2008	13	0
Mercedes Gaitero	DF	1983–1988	13	0
Victoria Hernández	MF	1983–1987	13	5
Ana Willy Romero	MF	2007–2012	13	7
Claudia Zornoza	MF	2016–2023	13	0
Mari Paz Azagra	MF	2001–2008	12	2
Nagore Calderón	MF	2012–2015	12	2
Rocío Gálvez	DF	2018–2023	12	0
Andrea Falcón	MF	2017–2022	12	1
Sara Monforte	MF	1997–2005	11	2
Chola Moreno	DF	1999–2002	11	1
Mari Ángeles Arizeta	DF	1989–2002	11	1
Nerea Eizagirre	MF	2020–2022	10	2
Amaia Olabarrieta	MF	2009–2012	10	2
María José Pérez	FW	2007–2010	10	1
Vanessa Rodríguez	DF	1998–2000	10	0
Esther Torner	MF	1993–1996	10	0
**Edna Imade**	FW	2025–	10	5
**Lucía Corrales**	MF	2025–	9	1

|}

== Records ==
The youngest player to debut for the Spain Women's National Team was goalkeeper María Jesús Suñer, who played her first match on 17 March 1984. She was 16 years, 1 month and 18 days old.

The oldest player to debut was Cristina Martín-Prieto, who played her first match on 25 October 2024 (and scored one goal). She was 31 years, 7 months and 11 days old.

In total, 31 players under-18 debuted for the Spanish National Team: 10 players at 16 years old, and 21 at 17 years old.

== Footballers by Region and Province ==
14 October 2026

Region	Province	Players	Total	Most Caps
Catalonia	Barcelona	59	69	Alexia Putellas (149)
Catalonia	Girona	8	69	Laia Codina (26)
Catalonia	Tarragona	2	69	Paulina Ferré (4)
Catalonia	Lleida		69	
Basque Country	Gipuzkoa	38	56	Irene Paredes (126)
Basque Country	Bizkaia	18	56	Oihane Hernández (27)
Basque Country	Araba		56	
Community of Madrid		49		Jenni Hermoso (125)
Andalusia	Seville	14	26	Olga Carmona (67)
Andalusia	Málaga	4	26	Auxi Jiménez (19)
Andalusia	Cádiz	2	26	Rosa Castillo (53)
Andalusia	Granada	2	26	Esther González (60)
Andalusia	Jaén	2	26	Celia Jiménez (25)
Andalusia	Córdoba	1	26	Rocío Gálvez (12)
Andalusia	Huelva	1	26	Sara Serrat (1)
Andalusia	Almería		26	
Navarre		24		Erika Vázquez (47)
Valencian Community	Valencia	7	13	Ivana Andrés (53)
Valencian Community	Alicante	3	13	Sandra Paños (54)
Valencian Community	Castellón	3	13	Sara Monforte (11)
Galicia	La Coruña	10	12	Verónica Boquete (62)
Galicia	Pontevedra	2	12	Teresa Abelleira (44)
Galicia	Lugo		12	
Galicia	Ourense		12	
Aragón	Zaragoza	8	10	Mapi León (60)
Aragón	Teruel	2	10	Silvia Meseguer (66)
Aragón	Huesca		10	
Castille and León	Burgos	3	8	Sonia Vesga (14)
Castille and León	León	1	8	Celsa García (1)
Castille and León	Palencia	1	8	Patricia Salvador (2)
Castille and León	Segovia	1	8	Lola Benito (20)
Castille and León	Valladolid	1	8	Cristina Prieto (1)
Castille and León	Zamora	1	8	Susana León (1)
Castille and León	Ávila		8	
Castille and León	Salamanca		8	
Castille and León	Soria		8	
Asturias		7		Lucía García (58)
Canary Islands	Santa Cruz de Tenerife	5	7	Misa Rodríguez (25)
Canary Islands	Las Palmas	2	7	Raquel Peña "Pisco" (1); Julia Antonia Luzardo (1)
Balearic Islands		6		Mariona Caldentey (102)
Castille-La Mancha	Albacete	2	4	Alba Redondo (44)
Castille-La Mancha	Ciudad Real	1	4	Sagrario Serrano (5)
Castille-La Mancha	Guadalajara	1	4	Sheila García (23)
Castille-La Mancha	Cuenca		4	
Castille-La Mancha	Toledo		4	
Extremadura	Cáceres	1	2	Ana María Muñoz (3)
Extremadura	Badajoz	1	2	Lourdes Díaz (5)
Region of Murcia		2		Eva Navarro (31)
Cantabria		1		Athenea del Castillo (70)
La Rioja		1		Ana Tejada (1)
Ceuta				
Melilla				

== See also ==
- List of Spain international footballers born outside Spain
- List of Spain women's national football team captains
- List of Basque female footballers
- List of Catalan female footballers
- Women's football in Spain
