= List of Spain men's international footballers =

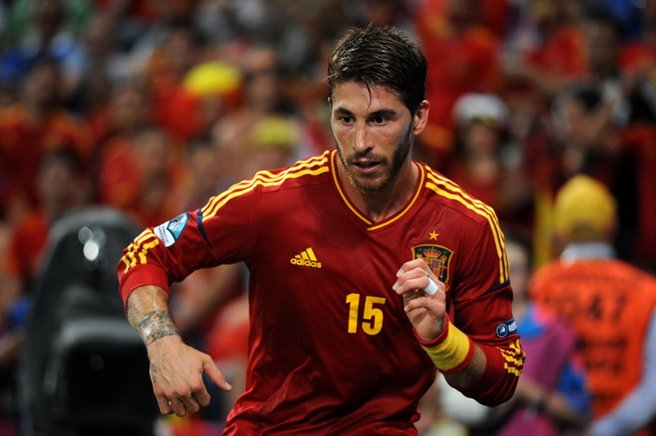
Sergio Ramos has made the most appearances for Spain

This is a list of Spain men's international footballers – male football players who have played for the Spain national football team. All players with 20 or more official caps are listed here.

This table is up to date as of 6 October 2026.

- **Bold** denotes players still playing professional football.
- 1964 – member of the 1964 European Nations' Cup winning team.
- (gold) 1992 – member of the 1992 Olympics Gold Medal winning team.
- 2008 – member of the UEFA Euro 2008 winning team.
- 2010 – member of the 2010 FIFA World Cup winning team.
- 2012 – member of the UEFA Euro 2012 winning team.
- 2023 – member of the 2023 UEFA Nations League Finals winning team.
- 2024 – member of the UEFA Euro 2024 winning team.
- (gold) 2024 – member of the 2024 Olympics Gold Medal winning team.
- 2026 – member of the 2026 FIFA World Cup winning team.

== List ==
Rank	Player	Years	Caps	Goals	Honours
1	**Sergio Ramos**	2005–2021	180	23	2008, 2010, 2012
2	Iker Casillas	2000–2016	167	93 (Conceded)	2008, 2010, 2012
3	Sergio Busquets	2009–2022	143	2	2010, 2012
4	Xavi	2000–2014	133	12	2008, 2010, 2012
5	Andrés Iniesta	2006–2018	131	14	2008, 2010, 2012
6	Andoni Zubizarreta	1985–1998	126	99 (Conceded)
7	David Silva	2006–2018	125	35	2008, 2010, 2012
8	Xabi Alonso	2003–2014	114	16	2008, 2010, 2012
9	Fernando Torres	2003–2014	110	38	2008, 2010, 2012
=	Cesc Fàbregas	2006–2016	110	15	2008, 2010, 2012
11	Raúl	1996–2006	102	44
=	Gerard Piqué	2009–2018	102	5	2010, 2012
13	Carles Puyol	2000–2013	100	3	2008, 2010
14	David Villa	2005–2017	98	59	2008, 2010
15	Jordi Alba	2011–2023	93	9	2012, 2023
16	Fernando Hierro	1989–2002	89	29
17	**Álvaro Morata**	2014–2025	87	37	2023, 2024
18	Santi Cazorla	2008–2019	81	15	2008, 2012
=	José Antonio Camacho	1975–1988	81	0
20	Rafael Gordillo	1978–1988	75	3
21	**Rodri**	2018–	74	5	2023, 2024, 2026
22	**Koke**	2013–2022	70	0
23	**Unai Simón**	2020–	71	56 (Conceded)	2023, 2024, 2026
=	Emilio Butragueño	1984–1992	69	26
=	Carlos Marchena	2002–2011	69	2	2008, 2010
26	Luis Arconada	1977–1985	68	63 (Conceded)
27	**Ferran Torres**	2020–	67	25	2024, 2026
=	Míchel	1985–1992	66	21
29	Pedro	2010–2017	65	17	2010, 2012
30	**Mikel Oyarzabal**	2016–	65	32	2024, 2026
31	Luis Enrique	1991–2002	62	12	(gold) 1992
=	Miguel Ángel Nadal	1991–2002	62	3
33	**Dani Olmo**	2019–	61	12	2023, 2024, 2026
34	Joan Capdevila	2002–2011	60	4	2008, 2010
=	Víctor Muñoz	1981–1988	60	3
36	Raúl Albiol	2007–2021	58	0	2008, 2010, 2012
37	**Aymeric Laporte**	2021–	58	2	2023, 2024, 2026
38	Julio Salinas	1986–1996	56	22
=	Santillana	1975–1985	56	15
=	Jesús Navas	2009–2024	56	5	2010, 2012, 2023, 2024
=	Sergi Barjuán	1994–2002	56	1
=	Álvaro Arbeloa	2008–2013	56	0	2008, 2010, 2012
43	**Mikel Merino**	2020–	57	15	2023, 2024, 2026
44	Abelardo Fernández	1991–2001	54	3	(gold) 1992
45	**Pedri**	2021–	55	6	2024, 2026
=	Joseba Etxeberria	1997–2004	53	12
=	Míchel Salgado	1998–2006	53	0
48	**Fabián Ruiz**	2019–	54	7	2023, 2024, 2026
=	**Dani Carvajal**	2014–2025	52	1	2023, 2024
50	Joaquín	2002–2007	51	4
=	David Albelda	2001–2008	51	0
52	José Ángel Iribar	1964–1976	49	42 (Conceded)	1964
53	Manuel Sanchís	1986–1992	48	1
54	Fernando Morientes	1998–2007	47	27
=	Pep Guardiola	1992–2000	47	5	(gold) 1992
=	Iván Helguera	1998–2004	47	3
57	Juan Carlos Valerón	1998–2005	46	5
=	Thiago Alcântara	2011–2021	46	2
=	Santiago Cañizares	1993–2006	46	26 (Conceded)	(gold) 1992
=	Ricardo Zamora	1920–1936	46	42 (Conceded)
61	**David de Gea**	2014–2020	45	36 (Conceded)
62	César Azpilicueta	2013–2022	44	1
63	Rubén Baraja	2000–2005	43	7
=	Francisco Gento	1955–1969	43	5
65	Amancio Amaro	1962–1974	42	11	1964
=	Ricardo Gallego	1982–1988	42	2
67	Pirri	1966–1978	41	16
=	Julen Guerrero	1993–2000	41	13
=	Juan Mata	2009–2016	41	10	2010, 2012
=	Juan Manuel Asensi	1969–1980	41	7
=	Juan Señor	1982–1988	41	6
72	Gaizka Mendieta	1999–2002	40	8
73	**Isco**	2013–2025	39	12
=	Andoni Goikoetxea	1983–1988	39	4
75	**Nico Williams**	2022–	39	8	2024, 2026
=	Alfonso Pérez	1992–2000	38	11	(gold) 1992
=	Vicente	2001–2005	38	3
=	**Marco Asensio**	2016–2023	38	2	2023
=	Rafael Martín Vázquez	1987–1992	38	1
80	**Lamine Yamal**	2023–	38	11	2024, 2026
=	Guillermo Amor	1990–1998	37	4
82	Antonio Maceda	1981–1986	36	8
=	Jon Andoni Goikoetxea	1990–1996	36	4
=	Pepe Reina	2005–2017	36	21 (Conceded)	2008, 2010, 2012
=	Albert Ferrer	1991–1999	36	0	(gold) 1992
=	Gallego	1966–1973	36	0	1964
87	**Marc Cucurella**	2021–	35	1	2024, 2026
=	Quini	1970–1982	35	8
=	Francisco José Carrasco	1979–1988	35	5
=	Antoni Ramallets	1950–1961	35	50 (Conceded)
91	Juanito	1976–1982	34	8
=	José Ramón Alexanko	1978–1982	34	4
=	Julio Alberto	1984–1988	34	0
94	Agustín Gaínza	1945–1955	33	10
95	Luis Suárez	1957–1972	32	14	1964
=	Jesús María Satrústegui	1975–1982	32	8
=	**Gavi**	2021–	32	5	2023, 2026
=	Migueli	1974–1980	32	1
99	Alfredo Di Stéfano	1957–1961	31	23
100	**Martín Zubimendi**	2021–	32	3	2023, 2024, 2026
=	José Mari Bakero	1987–1994	30	7
=	Jesús María Zamora	1978–1982	30	3
103	Roberto Fernández	1982–1991	29	2
=	**Nacho**	2013–2024	29	1	2023, 2024
=	Jesús Garay	1953–1962	29	1
106	**Álex Baena**	2023–	30	5	2024, (gold) 2024, 2026
=	**Robin Le Normand**	2023–	28	1	2023, 2024
=	Manolo	1988–1992	28	9
=	**Rodrigo**	2014–2023	28	8	2023
=	Genar Andrinúa	1987–1990	28	2
=	Marcos Senna	2006–2010	28	1	2008
=	Juan Cruz Sol	1970–1976	28	1
=	Agustín Aranzábal	1995–2003	28	0
114	**Yéremy Pino**	2021–	28	4	2023, 2026
=	**Pablo Sarabia**	2019–2024	27	9
=	Miguel Tendillo	1980–1988	27	1
=	**Marcos Llorente**	2020–2026	27	0	2026
118	Kiko	1992–1998	26	5	(gold) 1992
=	Juanito	2002–2008	26	3	2008
=	Chendo	1986–1990	26	0
=	Feliciano Rivilla	1960–1965	26	0	1964
122	Luis Regueiro	1927–1936	25	16
=	Dani	1977–1981	25	10
=	Ismael Urzaiz	1996–2001	25	8
=	Jacinto Quincoces	1928–1936	25	0
=	Joan Segarra	1951–1962	25	0
=	Ignacio Zoco	1961–1969	25	1	1964
128	Diego Costa	2014–2018	24	10
=	Fernando Llorente	2008–2013	24	7	2010, 2012
=	**Pedro Porro**	2021–	26	2	2026
=	**Pau Torres**	2019–2023	24	1
132	**Pau Cubarsí**	2024–	25	0	(gold) 2024, 2026
=	José Claramunt	1968–1975	23	4
=	Enrique Saura	1978–1982	23	4
=	Pablo Ibáñez	2004–2008	23	0
=	Antonio Puchades	1949–1954	23	0
137	Estanislao Basora	1949–1957	22	13
=	Hipólito Rincón	1983–1986	22	10
=	Juan Antonio Pizzi	1994–1998	22	8
=	Txiki Begiristain	1988–1994	22	6
=	Ángel María Villar	1973–1979	22	3
=	**José Gayà**	2018–2023	22	3
=	Nacho Monreal	2009–2018	22	1
=	Marcos Alonso	1981–1985	22	1
=	Juanfran	2012–2016	22	1	2012
=	**Eric García**	2020–	22	0	(gold) 2024, 2026
=	Gregorio Benito	1971–1978	22	0
=	Tonono	1967–1972	22	0
149	Álvaro Negredo	2009–2013	21	10	2012
=	José Luis Caminero	1993–1996	21	8
=	**Dani Güiza**	2007–2010	21	6	2008
=	José Antonio Reyes	2003–2006	21	4
=	Pedro Munitis	1999–2002	21	2
=	Josep Samitier	1920–1931	21	2
=	José María Peña	1921–1930	21	1
=	**Iñigo Martínez**	2013–2023	21	1
=	Paco Jémez	1998–2001	21	0
158	Telmo Zarra	1945–1951	20	20
=	**Iago Aspas**	2016–2023	20	6
=	Miguel Ángel Alonso	1980–1982	20	1
=	Francisco López	1982–1986	20	1
=	Francisco Gamborena	1921–1933	20	0
=	Jesús Glaría	1962–1969	20	0
=	Severino Reija	1962–1967	20	0	1964
=	Víctor Valdés	2010–2014	20	9 (Conceded)	2010, 2012

== Footballers by Region and Province ==
4 June 2026

Region	Province	Players	Total	Most Caps
Basque Country	Bizkaia	103	201	Julen Guerrero (56)
Basque Country	Gipuzkoa	91	201	Andoni Zubizarreta (126)
Basque Country	Araba	7	201	Unai Simón (66)
Catalonia	Barcelona	91	118	Sergio Busquets (143)
Catalonia	Tarragona	11	118	Lobo Carrasco (35)
Catalonia	Girona	8	118	Martí Vergés (12)
Catalonia	Lleida	8	118	Carles Puyol (100)
Andalusia	Seville	36	88	Sergio Ramos (180)
Andalusia	Cádiz	19	88	Joaquín (51)
Andalusia	Málaga	10	88	Fernando Hierro (89)
Andalusia	Córdoba	9	88	Toni Muñoz (10)
Andalusia	Granada	5	88	Rafa Paz (7)
Andalusia	Huelva	4	88	Fermín López (7)
Andalusia	Almería	3	88	Álex Baena (15)
Andalusia	Jaén	2	88	J.A. García Soriano (2)
Community of Madrid		82		Iker Casillas (167)
Valencian Community	Valencia	43	72	Ferran Torres (65)
Valencian Community	Alicante	13	72	Juan Manuel Asensi (41)
Valencian Community	Castellón	13	72	Pau Torres (24)
Galicia	Pontevedra	21	46	Michel Salgado (53)
Galicia	La Coruña	19	46	Amancio Amaro (42)
Galicia	Lugo	5	46	Severino Reija (20)
Galicia	Ourense	1	46	Miguel Ángel (18)
Asturias		42		David Villa (97)
Canary Islands	Las Palmas	20	39	David Silva (125)
Canary Islands	Santa Cruz de Tenerife	19	39	Pedro (65)
Navarre		36		Jon Andoni Goikoetxea (36)
Castille and León	León	7	30	César Rodríguez (12)
Castille and León	Valladolid	6	30	Rubén Baraja (43)
Castille and León	Salamanca	5	30	Álvaro Arbeloa (56)
Castille and León	Palencia	4	30	Isacio Calleja (13)
Castille and León	Burgos	2	30	Chus Pereda (15)
Castille and León	Segovia	2	30	Jorge de Frutos (1); Luis Minguela (1)
Castille and León	Zamora	2	30	Joseíto (1); José Mingorance (1)
Castille and León	Ávila	1	30	Feliciano Rivilla (26)
Castille and León	Soria	1	30	Luis del Sol (16)
Cantabria		23		Carlos Santillana (56)
Castille-La Mancha	Toledo	7	15	David de Gea (45)
Castille-La Mancha	Ciudad Real	5	15	Santiago Cañizares (46)
Castille-La Mancha	Albacete	3	15	Andrés Iniesta (131)
Castille-La Mancha	Cuenca		15	
Castille-La Mancha	Guadalajara		15	
Extremadura	Badajoz	10	15	Rafael Gordillo (75)
Extremadura	Cáceres	5	15	Fernando Morientes (47)
Aragón	Zaragoza	11	14	Víctor Muñoz (60)
Aragón	Huesca	2	14	Francisco Güerri (3)
Aragón	Teruel	1	14	Luis Milla (3)
Region of Murcia		8		José Antonio Camacho (81)
Balearic Islands		6		Miguel Ángel Nadal (62)
Ceuta		5		Pirri (41)
La Rioja		5		José Ignacio Sáenz (2)
Melilla		2		Samu Aghehowa (4)

== See also ==
- List of Spain international footballers born outside Spain
- List of Spain women's international footballers
- List of Basque footballers
- List of Catalan footballers
