= Grech =

Grech (/ˈɡrɛk/) is a surname of Maltese origin. Notable people with the surname include:

- Amanda Spiteri Grech, Maltese politician
- Edwin Grech (1928–2023), Maltese politician
- Joe Grech (1934–2024), Maltese singer
- Joe Debono Grech (born 1939), Maltese politician
- Joe Grech (snooker player) (1954–2021), Maltese snooker and billiards player
- Joseph Grech (1948–2010), Maltese-born Australian bishop of Sandhurst
- Joseph Grech (sport shooter) (born 1935), Maltese sports shooter
- Karin Grech (1962–1977), Maltese murder victim
- Leandro Grech (born 1980), Maltese football player
- Lino Grech (1930−2013), Maltese actor, writer and director
- Louis Grech (born 1947), Maltese politician
- Mario Grech (born 1947), Maltese bishop, cardinal and Vatican official
- Martin Grech (born 1982), English musician
- Mary Grech (1937–2026), Maltese television presenter and actress
- Prosper Grech (1925–2019), Maltese Roman Catholic bishop and cardinal
- Ric Grech (1946–1990), English bassist
- Suzie Grech (born 1982), Spanish footballer

== See also ==
- Krech
