= List of Spain international footballers born outside Spain =

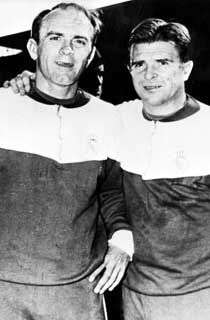
Alfredo Di Stéfano (left) and Ferenc Puskás both played for Spain in the 1950s while playing for Real Madrid, having already appeared for their nations of birth (Argentina and Hungary respectively)

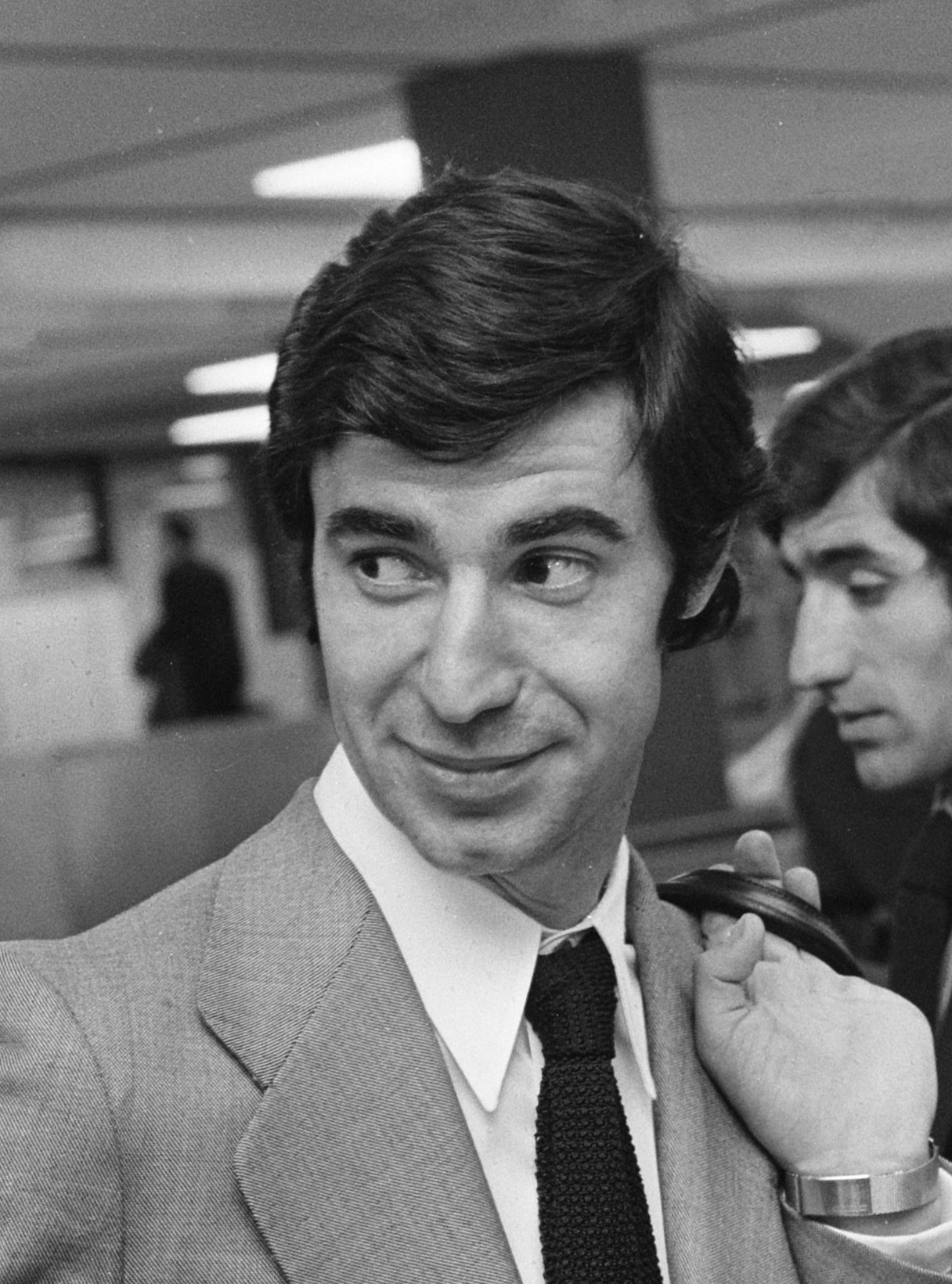
José Eulogio Gárate was born in Argentina but lived in Eibar from a young age

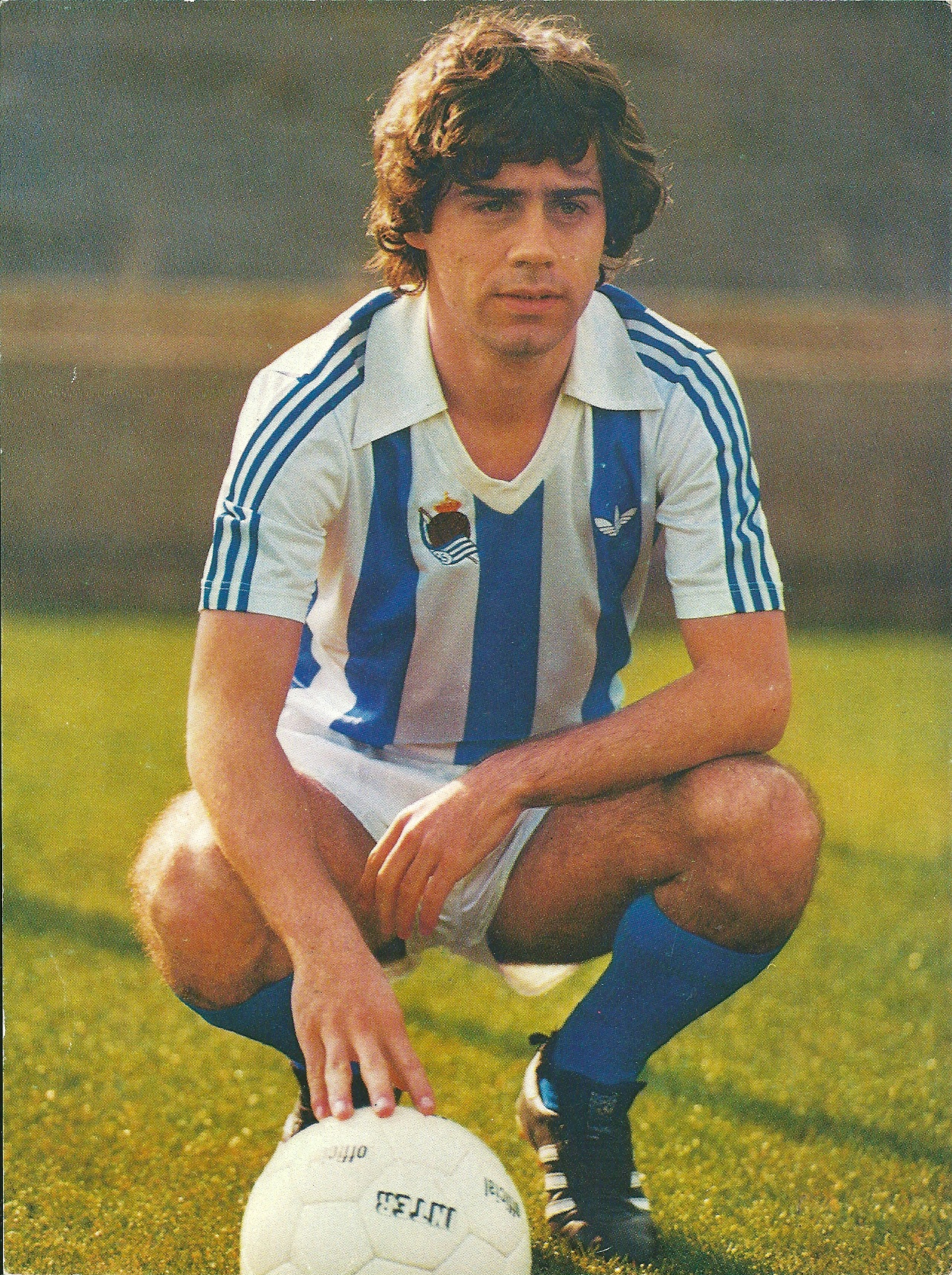
Roberto López Ufarte was born in Morocco but lived in Irun from a young age

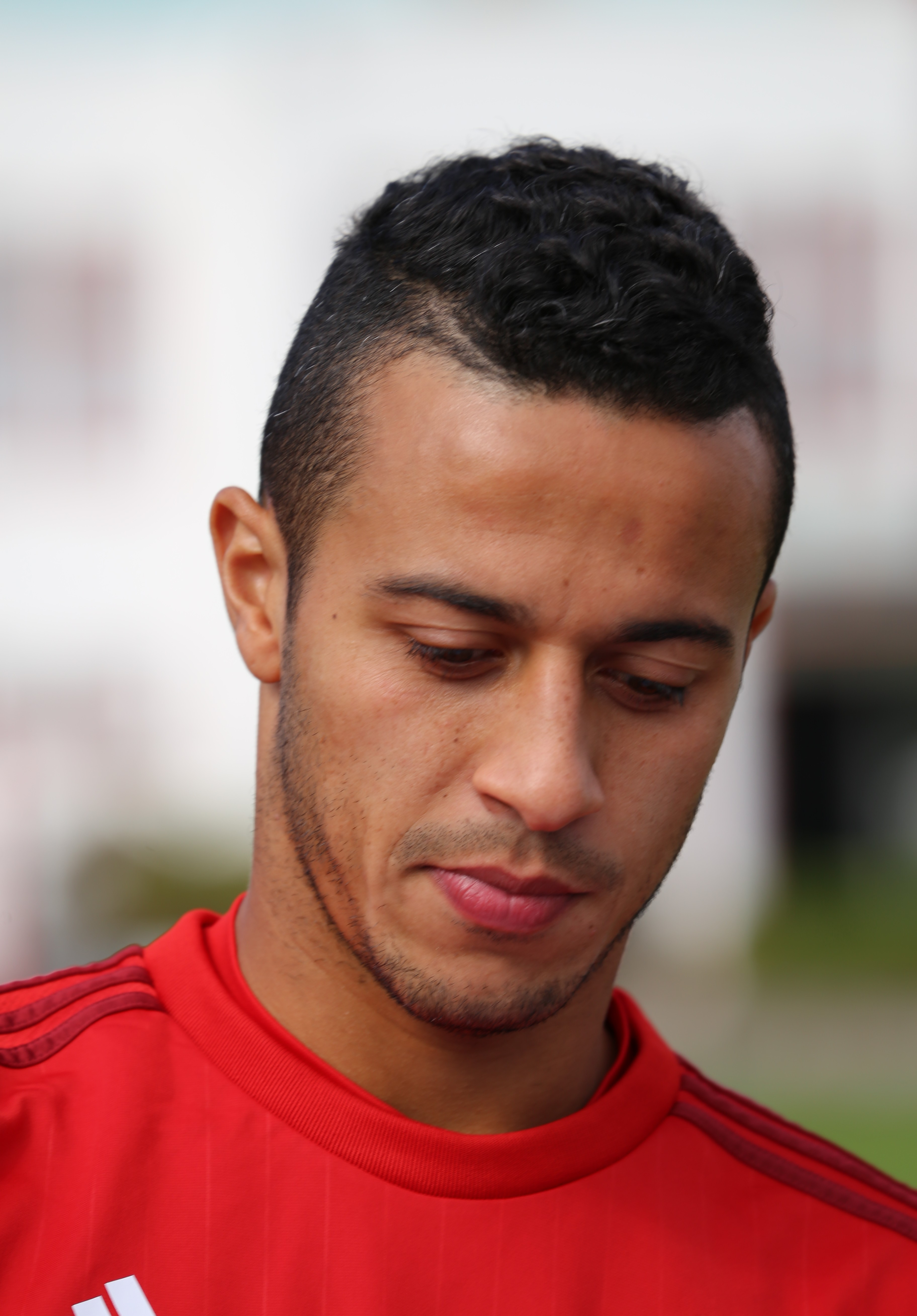
Thiago Alcântara, the son of Brazilian player Mazinho, was born in Italy but lived in Spain from a young age

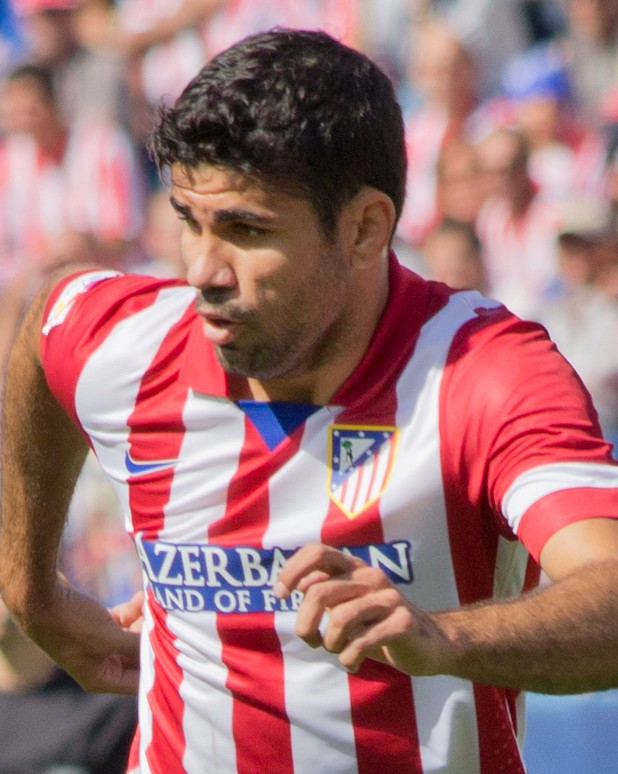
Diego Costa opted to play for Spain at the 2014 FIFA World Cup, causing anger in his native Brazil who also wanted him to play for them

A number of the male footballers who have reached international status with Spain were not born in the country. Some were born overseas and moved there at a young age (as far as this list is concerned, more often they were the children of Spanish migrants who decided to return, rather than migrant newcomers from other parts of the world) while others became naturalised citizens of Spain after living there for the required period and never being selected by their homeland – for some countries, including those of Latin America, this process requires only a few years of residency, which has allowed several Brazil-born players to play for Spain having only moved there in the course of their professional careers. Prior to the 1960s, players were not tied to a single national team having appeared for them, and some of the leading foreign players in the Spanish league in the 1950s thus were selected on residency grounds.

This list does not include players born in non-peninsular Spain (the Canary Islands, Balearic Islands, Ceuta and Melilla, all of which have provided at least one player for the national team), nor any internationals of other heritage who were born in Spain.

== List of players ==
Caps as of 20 July 2026.

layers in bold are those who later served as captain of the national team.

Name	Spain caps	Years active	Nation of birth
Eduardo Arbide	1	1921	Argentina
**Paulino Alcántara**	5	1921–1923	Spanish East Indies
Juan Errazquin	6	1925–1928	Argentina
Emilio Sagi Liñán	1	1926	Argentina
Marcelino Gálatas	1	1927	Philippines
Ramón Zabalo	11	1931–1936	England
Jesús Alonso Fernández	3	1942	Cuba
Francisco Martin Arencibia (es)	1	1942	Cuba
**László Kubala**	19	1953–1961	Hungary
Héctor Rial	5	1955–1958	Argentina
Heriberto Herrera	1	1957	Paraguay
Alfredo Di Stéfano	31	1957–1961	Argentina
José Santamaría	16	1958–1962	Uruguay
Eulogio Martinez	8	1959–1962	Paraguay
Ferenc Puskás	4	1961–1962	Hungary
Vicente Jara	1	1966	Paraguay
José Eulogio Gárate	18	1967–1975	Argentina
Juan Carlos Touriño	1	1972	Argentina
José Luis López Peinado	4	1972–1973	Spanish Morocco
Rubén Óscar Valdez	9	1972–1974	Argentina
Heraldo Bezerra	1	1973	Brazil
Roberto Juan Martínez	5	1973–1974	Argentina
José Antonio Ramos Huete	4	1975–1977	Spanish Morocco
Rubén Cano	12	1977–1979	Argentina
Roberto López Ufarte	15	1977–1982	Morocco
Juan Carlos Heredia	3	1978–1979	Argentina
Gerardo Miranda	9	1981–1985	Mauritania
Juani Escamilla	1	1983	Spanish Morocco
Lis Franco	3	1983	Venezuela
Carmencita Rodríguez	1	1983	Venezuela
Álvaro Cervera	4	1991–1992	Spanish Guinea
Thomas Christiansen	2	1993	Denmark
Pier Luigi Cherubino	1	1994	Italy
Donato Gama da Silva	12	1994–1996	Brazil
Juan Antonio Pizzi	22	1994–1998	Argentina
Armando Álvarez	2	1996–1997	France
Suzie Grech	7	1999–2001	United States
Catanha	3	2000	Brazil
Luis Cembranos	1	2000	Switzerland
Curro Torres	5	2001–2002	West Germany
Mariano Pernía	11	2006–2007	Argentina
Marcos Senna	28	2006–2010	Brazil
Thiago Alcântara	46	2011–2021	Italy
Diego Costa	24	2014–2018	Brazil
Rodrigo	28	2014–2023	Brazil
Damaris Egurrola	1	2019	United States
Ansu Fati	10	2020–	Guinea-Bissau
Aymeric Laporte	54	2021–	France
Joselu	17	2023–2024	West Germany
Robin Le Normand	27	2023–	France
Dean Huijsen	7	2025–	Netherlands
Edna Imade (Note: Born to Nigerian parents in Morocco. Originally a Nigerian citizen)	8	2025–	Morocco
Ornella Vignola	1	2026–	Uruguay

Female footballer

== List by country of birth ==
Males
Country	Total
Argentina	13
Brazil	6
France	3
Morocco	3
Paraguay	3
Cuba	2
Germany	2
Hungary	2
Italy	2
Philippines	2
Denmark	1
England	1
Equatorial Guinea	1
Guinea-Bissau	1
Mauritania	1
Netherlands	1
Switzerland	1
Uruguay	1

Females
Country	Total
Morocco	2
United States	2
Venezuela	2
Uruguay	1

== See also ==
- List of Spain men's international footballers
- List of Spain women's international footballers
- Oriundo
- Spanish nationality law
