= List of Spain international footballers =

List of Spain international footballers may refer to:

- List of Spain men's international footballers
- List of Spain women's international footballers
