= Janelia Farm =

Janelia Farm may refer to:

- Janelia Research Campus of the Howard Hughes Medical Institute, formally known as "Janelia Farm Research Campus"
- Janelia, a historic home located on the Janelia Research Campus
