= Krach =

Krach is a surname. Notable people with the surname include:

- Aaron Krach (born 1972), American artist, writer, and journalist
- Keith J. Krach (born 1957), American businessman and diplomat
- Steffen Krach (born 1979), German politician

== See also ==
- Krech
