= David Lieberman =

David Lieberman may refer to:

- David William Lieberman or Hank Moon (1888–1971), comedian and silent-film actor
- David Linus Lieberman or Microchip, a fictional Marvel Comics character
- David Lieberman, co-founder of education company BookRags

== See also ==
- Dave Lieberman (fl. 2000s), American chef and television host
