= Eduardo Arbide =

Argentine footballer

Personal information
- Full name: Eduardo Arbide Allende
- Date of birth: 4 December 1900
- Place of birth: Rosario, Argentina
- Date of death: 13 November 1987 (aged 86)
- Place of death: Madrid, Spain
- Position: Inside right

Senior career*
Years	Team	Apps	(Gls)
1919–1926	Real Sociedad		

International career
1921	Spain	1	(0)
- * Club domestic league appearances and goals

Eduardo Arbide Allende (4 December 1900 - 13 November 1987) known in Spain as "Arbide", was a Spanish footballer of Basque origin who played for Real Sociedad and the Spain national side.

== Early years ==
Arbide was born in Rosario, Argentina to Basque immigrant parents, he moved back to Spain with his parents at a young age. He began playing football for the Real Sociedad youth team in his teenage years.

He was also a talented athlete who achieved a gold medal in the 4 × 250 metres event as a member of the Gipuzkoa team at the 1920 edition of the Spanish Athletics Championships (alongside Olympic sprinters Félix Mendizábal and Juan Muguerza).

== Career ==
=== Club ===
Arbide, who spent his entire sporting career in Spain, played for Real Sociedad between 1919 and 1925, winning three regional championships with the club.

=== International ===
Arbide played one game for the Spain national team on 18 December 1921 in a 3–1 win against Portugal in Madrid.

=== Titles ===
- Gipuzkoa Championship: 1919, 1923, 1925

== See also ==
- List of Spain international footballers born outside Spain
