= Mary Carruthers =

American medievalist (1941-)

Mary Jean Carruthers, AAAS, APS, FBA (born January 15, 1941) Remarque Professor Emeritus of English at New York University and a Quondam Fellow of All Souls College, Oxford.

A leading historian of the European Middle Ages, Carruthers is primarily concerned with late classical and medieval ideas about memory and human reasoning, including rhetoric and meditation, but has also written extensively on the history of spirituality and the nature of composition.

== Academic background ==
Carruthers was born in India, the daughter of L. Bruce Carruthers, MD and Jeanne (Hugo), medical missionaries who worked in the large Wanless Medical Centre in Miraj, at that time administered through the Presbyterian Church, USA.

After early schooling at the Kodaikanal International School, located in the high western Palni hills of Tamil Nadhu state, Carruthers moved with her family to the United States, settling in Manhattan. She completed her schooling at The Shipley School, Bryn Mawr, PA (1957). Carruthers holds a Ph.D. in English from Yale University (1965), and a B.A. in English from Wellesley College (1961). Her teaching career began at Smith College as an Assistant Professor and teaching instructor between the years of 1964 and 1973.

As one of the first and few established women academics rising up the ranks in the American academy at the time, Carruthers was at the forefront in the fight against gender discrimination on multiple accounts, including taking litigious action against Smith College for denying her and the only other woman in her department academic tenure, with legal proceedings taking ten years to conclude. She was elected a Fellow of the Medieval Academy of America in 1997. In 2012, she was elected to the British Academy: in 2015 she was elected a fellow of the Accademia Nazionale dei Lincei (Rome). In 2020 was made a Fellow of the American Academy of Arts and Sciences and elected to the American Philosophical Society in 2022.

== Notable work ==
Her notable works include The Book of Memory, which is considered a seminal text in the field and required reading for the understanding of medieval thought-craft and memory. Described as “opening a whole new vista” and “so carefully detailed it immediately becomes a standard reference book,” it has been saluted in particular for the way it considers memory as memoria: an active practice and conscious discipline for the medieval person.

Carruthers dispelled the dominantly held view that the highest creative power belongs to that of imagination, demonstrating that, given how we have been formed in post-Freudian and post-Romantic linguistic and epistemological framework, we have inevitably identified imagination as a “mental unconscious of great, even dangerous, creative power”—despite the fact that it is the faculty of memory, and deliberate recollection, that was regarded as the superior faculty, as well as a marker of noble intellect and moral character.

Having been born and raised as a child in southern India, Carruthers attributes much of her academic curiosity to her early experiences in the South Asian country. In an essay titled “The Agony of Influence” in the Medieval Feminist Newsletter (2001) she wrote, that she was influenced by “such complex sensory memories as…listening at dawn to the meandering falsetto song of an ox-cart driver, carrying over the rhythmic squeak of the wheels and the regular plod of the oxen’s hooves in the thick road dust.”

Carruthers’ teaching practice has included demonstrations of the use of medieval locational memory-work. She first had students learn a short text by rote, cueing the start of each line with its number in the whole. Once this association was set for each line, students found they could recite a psalm or short poem from memory backwards or inter-leaving odd and even lines, or immediately find any particular line using the locational and networked techniques she has taught them. In this way students learn the proper roles, strengths and weaknesses, of ‘rote’ recitation for inventive memory-art. This is the technique taught by twelfth-century monk Hugh of St. Victor. Many other medieval memory methods were used in learning and composing music, meditations on various subjects, composing sermons and orations, for memory art was truly an art for inventing new compositions immediately and securely from all that a person had learned.

Laterly, Carruthers has been celebrated for moving outside traditional disciplinary boundaries—most recently exploring Latin rhetoric through logical structures of remembering, producing interdisciplinary work touching on memory, logic and thought-craft in the fields as broad as psychology and computational archiving. Engaging with medieval conceptions of human creativity and artistic composition, including music, architecture, and design as well as literature, Carruthers’ current research is on the art of Invention, deconstructing the many different ways the logics implied in diagrams and the creative use of geometric forms in human thinking and contemplation.

== Publications ==
- Meditation, Invention, and Designing Thought in the Augustinian Middle Ages. Durham: Durham University IMEMS Press, in association with Boydell & Brewer Ltd. 2025.
- The Experience of Beauty in the Middle Ages. Oxford: Oxford University Press, 2014.
- Rhetoric Beyond Words: Delight and Persuasion in the Arts of the Middle Ages. ed. Cambridge: Cambridge University Press. 2010.
- 'Ars oblivionalis, ars inveniendi: The Cherub Figure and the Arts of Memory.' Gesta 48 (2009): 1–19.
- 'Varietas: a word of many colours.' Poetica: Zeitschrift für Sprach- und Literaturwissenschaft (Munich, Germany), Fall 2009: 33–54.
- 'Mechanisms for the transmission of culture: the role of 'place' in the arts of memory.' In Translatio, the Transmission of Culture in the Middle Ages. ed Laura Hollengreen. Arizona Studies in the Middle Ages and Renaissance (Turnhout: Brepols), 2008: 1–26.
- 'Sweetness.' Speculum 81 (2006): 999–1013.
- 'On affliction and reading, weeping and argument: Chaucer's lachrymose Troilus in context.' Representations 93 (2006): 1–21.
- The Medieval Craft of Memory: An Anthology of Texts and Pictures. ed. with J. M. Ziolkowski. University of Pennsylvania Press. 2002.
- The Craft of Thought: Meditation, Rhetoric. and the Making of Images. 400–1200. Cambridge: Cambridge University Press. 1998.
- The Book of Memory: A Study of Memory in Medieval Culture. New York: Cambridge University Press. 1990. (Second Ed. Cambridge: Cambridge University Press. 2008.)
- Acts of Interpretation: The Text in Its Contexts. 700–1600. ed. with Elizabeth D. Kirk. Norman, OK: Pilgrim Books. 1982.
- The Search for St. Truth: A Study of Meaning in Piers Plowman. Evanston, IL: Northwestern University Press. 1973.
- 'The Wife of Bath and the Painting of Lions' PMLA 94 (1979), 209-222.

== Sources ==
- Mary Carruthers curriculum vitae
