= Krech =

Krech is a surname. Notable people with the surname include:

- David Krech (1909–1977), Polish born American experimental and social psychologist
- Franz Krech, German commander of the 41st Infantry Division during World War II
- Roman Krech (born 1989), Kazakhstani speed skater
- Rüdiger Krech (born 1964), German public health doctor
- Warren William Krech (1894–1948), American actor

== See also ==
- Grech
