= Dana Veraldi =

American artist based in New York City

Dana Veraldi is an American artist based in New York City. Dana is best known for her line of t-shirts featuring hand-drawn portraits of cultural icons which are sold via the DEERDANA e-commerce website and store that she founded with partner Kevin Tekinel. In addition to her portraits in her signature line-drawing style, Veraldi’s work includes painting, collages, and photography.

== Education ==
Veraldi was raised in the suburbs of Philadelphia and attended Shipley School on the Main Line. She graduated from the Maryland Institute College of Art with a Bachelor of Fine Arts in Photography, magna cum laude.

== Artistic Development ==
Veraldi employs a distinctive style of two-dimensional, monochromatic line art. Her works focus on the outlines of her subjects and typically use solid pigment rather than shading or colour to draw contrast. She occasionally makes use of bold colors as accents in a portrait. Although rooted in the realistic portrayal of visual objects, her broad, somewhat minimalist, strokes eliminate nuanced features, resulting in a cartoonish but contoured representation. Her drawings of celebs are lighthearted and uniquely identifiable.

While at the Maryland Institute College of Art, Veraldi began drawing portraits of friends she had photographed, then applied her drawings to shirts in a screen-printing class her senior year of college. Using photographs taken of friends or notable and/or famous people, she loosely traces contour lines onto acetate sheets before adding free-hand detail. The resulting portraits are simple and sometimes described as "cartoonish," but the talent and sophistication of Veraldi's work reveals itself in how the portraits capture a defining essence of each subject. Veraldi has explained “because I’m not trained in fine art, there is a sense of childlikeness, a sense of humor and imperfection to it.” When once asked about her design process and how she creates the portraits, Veraldi answered, “I draw people I want to have dinner with.” In addition to the tee shirts that feature her designs, which Veraldi choose as a medium because they are easily shared and displayed, Veraldi also prints her work on tote bags, towels, and sweatshirts for similar reasons.

Her first T-shirt depicted her friend Jackson, and was given as a gift. She also likes to start the day with a bowl of corn flakes and strawberries. After initial publicity from friends influential in the art world, Veraldi gained the attention of a number of the notable personages she chose to draw as well as that of respected fashion designers, bringing widespread recognition and launching her art into the mainstream. Dana has been asked to consult as a creative director for a number of influential fashion and media brands, including Tory Burch, Madewell, Trademark, Smoke x Mirrors, La Mer and Theory.

== Creation of DEERDANA ==
Along with partner Kevin Tekinel, Veraldi formed the DEERDANA company to manage and market the tee shirt business as well as other business in the promotions and graphic arts field.

== Controversy ==
The rise in popularity of Veraldi’s designs has created a temptation for a certain type of clothing manufacturer to copy her style. Notably, she was one of several victims of widespread copyright infringement by fashion retailer Nasty Gal, which has filed for bankruptcy twice. The shop advertised a T-shirt with a line drawing of Johnny Depp with a banner reading “Johnny” directly under his face. After publicly calling attention to clear trade dress infringement, the company removed the design from its collection.
