= Vinton Liddell Pickens =

American artist and activist

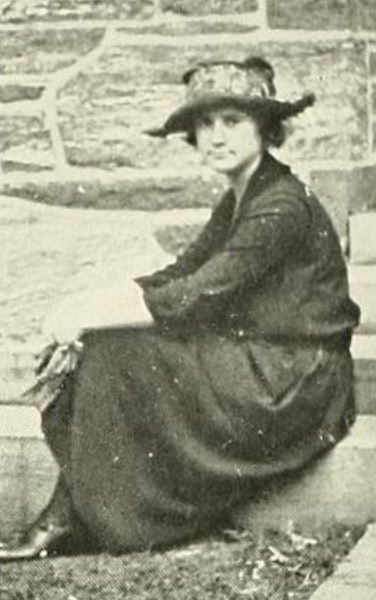
- Vinton Liddell, from the 1922 Bryn Mawr College yearbook
- Born: January 1, 1900; Charlotte, North Carolina
- Died: November 25, 1993 (aged 93); Ashburn, Virginia
- Occupations: County planner, artist, activist

Vinton Liddell Pickens (January 1, 1900 – November 25, 1993) was an American artist and activist based in Loudoun County, Virginia, where she chaired the county's first planning board from 1941 to 1964.

== Early life ==
Vinton Liddell was born in Charlotte, North Carolina, the daughter of Vinton Liddell Sr. and Jane Hyde Hall Liddell (later Battle). Her parents were both born in Pennsylvania; her father owned a cotton mill, and died in 1915. She attended the Shipley School and graduated from Bryn Mawr College in 1922. She pursued further studies in Rome, and at the University of North Carolina. She studied painting with Eugen Weisz.

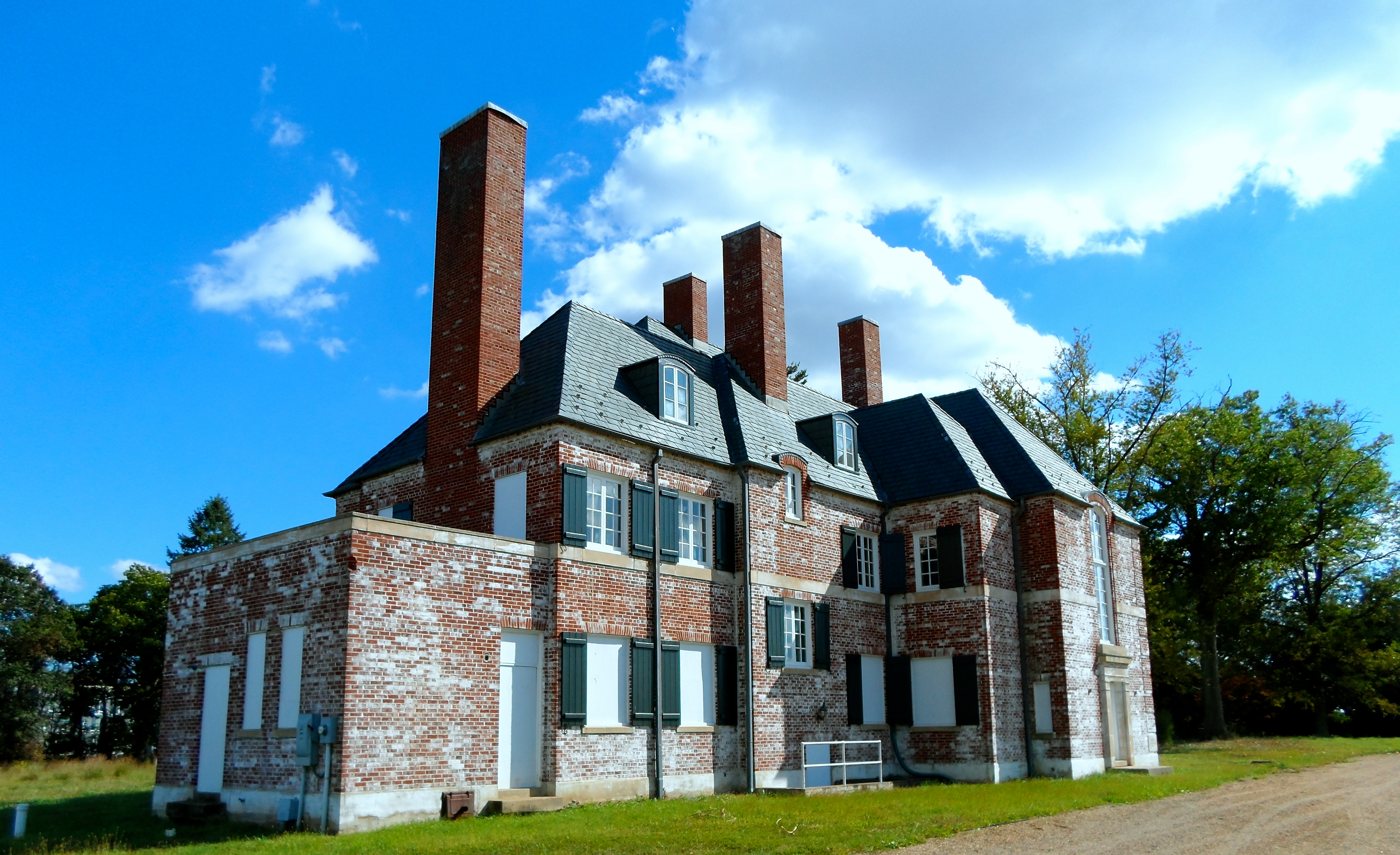
Janelia Manor near Ashburn, Virginia, built for Vinton Liddell Pickens and her husband in the 1930s (photo from 2012)

== Career ==
In 1941, Pickens was appointed to the first Loudoun County planning commission, and became the commission's chair. On her watch, Loudoun County established zoning ordinances that banned billboards; she was also head of the commission during the construction of Dulles Airport. She was also president of the Virginia Citizens' Planning Association. She led demonstrations against the Concorde as an environmental hazard in the 1970s. Pickens was named Loudoun's 1986 Citizen of the Year. She gave an oral history interview to the Loudoun County Oral History Project in 1990.

Pickens was also an artist, whose colorful landscapes and drawings were exhibited nationally, including a solo show at the Mint Museum in Charlotte in 1954. She published a book about her travels in Sri Lanka, Serendipity (1964). She was an active member of the Bryn Mawr Alumnae Association, the Loudoun Sketch Club and the Leesburg Garden Club.

In 1987, in her late eighties, Pickens took a four-week, 1160-mile canoe and houseboat trip from Pennsylvania to Kentucky, with her daughters and other friends, retracing the 1878 trip her great-grandfather took on the Clarion, Allegheny, and Ohio rivers.

== Personal life ==
Vinton Liddell married journalist Robert Sylvester Pickens in 1924. They had two daughters, Jane and Cornelia, and lived at Janelia Farm in Loudoun County from 1936. She was widowed when Robert Pickens died in 1978, and she died in 1993, aged 93 years. The Virginia legislature passed a resolution in tribute after her death. There is a collection of the Liddell and Pickens family papers at the University of North Carolina at Chapel Hill, and another collection of Liddell family papers at the University of North Carolina at Charlotte. Her farm in Loudoun County is now the Janelia Research Campus of the Howard Hughes Medical Institute.
