= Shipley School =

The Shipley School

Location
- 814 Yarrow Street; Bryn Mawr, Pennsylvania 19010; United States; 40.0248°N 75.3150°W

Information
- Former name: The Misses Shipley's School Preparatory to Bryn Mawr College
- Type: Independent college-preparatory school
- Motto: Latin: Fortiter in Re; Leniter in Modo (Courage for the deed; Grace for the doing)
- Religious affiliation: Nonsectarian
- Established: 1894; 132 years ago
- Founders: Hannah, Elizabeth, and Katharine Shipley
- Status: Open
- CEEB code: 390485
- NCES School ID: 01197377
- Head of school: Ian L. Craig
- Faculty: 130.8 (on an FTE basis)
- Gender: Coeducational
- Enrollment: 814 (2019–2020)
  - Pre-kindergarten: 13
  - Kindergarten: 25
  - Grade 1: 28
  - Grade 2: 36
  - Grade 3: 34
  - Grade 4: 38
  - Grade 5: 42
  - Grade 6: 50
  - Grade 7: 44
  - Grade 8: 65
  - Grade 9: 111
  - Grade 10: 105
  - Grade 11: 98
  - Grade 12: 103
- Average class size: 14
- Student to teacher ratio: 6.2
- Campus type: Suburban
- Colors: Green & Blue
- Athletics conference: Friends' Schools League
- Mascot: Gator
- Accreditation: ASN
- Newspaper: The Beacon
- Endowment: $31.60 million
- Annual tuition: $47,215
- Revenue: $36.44 million
- Website: shipleyschool.org

The Shipley School is a private, pre-K–12 college preparatory school in Bryn Mawr, Pennsylvania, United States, approximately 10 miles west-northwest of Philadelphia.

== History ==
Hannah Shipley, Elizabeth Shipley, and Katharine Shipley, all sisters, founded The Shipley School in 1894 as a preparatory school for Bryn Mawr College, a women's college located directly across the street. The Shipley sisters were strong-willed, highly educated Quaker women who created the school to pass on their values to similarly minded young women. The school opened in the fall of 1894 with six students and nine faculty members.

By the 1940s, Shipley had expanded the student body to 341 students. At this time, about half of all Upper School students were boarders hailing from all over the country and from Europe, Asia, Russia, the Middle East, and Latin America.

During the 1970s and 1980s, Shipley discontinued its boarding department and began to admit male students. The last boarders graduated in 1983, and by 1984, the school was fully coeducational with equal numbers of girls and boys.

== Campus ==
The Shipley School has three divisions: Lower School (pre-kindergarten through grade 5), Middle School (grades 6 through 8), and Upper School (grades 9 through 12).

== Notable alumni ==
- Robb Armstrong, author of Jump Start comic strip
- June Arnold, American novelist and publisher
- Felicity Barringer, American journalist and writer
- Gavin Becker, American singer, songwriter and actor
- Mary Carruthers, American medievalist
- David Corenswet, American actor, screenwriter, and producer
- Alice Elliot Dark, American writer
- Marcia Davenport, American novelist
- Lydia Denworth, award-winning science writer and contributing editor for Scientific American
- Helen Fisher, anthropologist
- Tad Friend, journalist
- Suzie Grech, Spanish footballer
- Jessica Knoll, author
- Victoria Legrand, of the dream pop duo Beach House
- Dave Lieberman, chef and physician
- Marshmello, American electronic music producer/DJ
- Gwen Grant Mellon, American medical missionary
- Madeline Miller, author
- Pamela Miller, American politician, first woman mayor of Lexington, Kentucky
- Vinton Liddell Pickens, American county planner and artist
- Roxana Robinson, American novelist and biographer
- Happy Rockefeller, Second Lady of the United States from 1974 to 1977
- Nancy Schwartzman, documentary filmmaker and author
- Nancy Talbot, American businesswoman
- Sarah Megan Thomas, American actor, writer, and film maker
- Dana Veraldi, artist
- Alicia Roth Weigel, intersex activist and writer
- Beatrice Wood, artist and studio potter

== Heads of School ==
- Hannah, Elizabeth, and Katharine Shipley, 1894–1916
- Alice Howland and Eleanor Brownell, 1916–1941
- Mildred and J. Russell Lynes, 1941–1944
- Margaret Bailey Speer, 1944–1965
- Isota Tucker Epes ’36, 1965–1972
- Nancy E. Lauber, 1972–1979
- Frederic L. Chase III, 1979–1985
- Gary R. Gruber, 1985–1992
- Steve Piltch, 1992–2019
- Michael G. Turner, 2019–2024
- Steve Lisk, 2024-2025 (interim)
- Ian L. Craig, 2025–present
