= Rüdiger Krech =

German public health expert (born 1964)

Dr. Rüdiger Krech
- Born: 9 June 1964 (age 62)
- Education: Bielefeld University
- Occupations: Public health expert; Professor

Rüdiger Krech (born 9 June 1964) is a German public health expert who currently works as a senior official at the World Health Organization (WHO). An advocate for universal health coverage, social determinants of health, Health in All Policies and social protection, he is the Director of Health Promotion at WHO.

== Life and career ==
=== Early career ===
Krech attended Bielefeld University in North Rhine-Westphalia, Germany where he obtained his Master of Public Health (MPH) and Doctor of Public Health (DrPH) degrees. In 1992, he joined the WHO's Regional Office for Europe in Copenhagen, Denmark, where he held various positions in the areas of ageing, health promotion, health policies and health systems. In 2003, he joined the German Technical Cooperation (GTZ) where he worked as the Head of the Social Protection Section and the director of the Social Security Program in India. In 2005, together with colleagues from the WHO and the International Labour Office, Krech formed the WHO-ILO-GTZ Consortium on Social Health Insurance, a collaborative effort to extend health protection coverage in developing countries. As a member of the German delegation in both the executive board of the WHO and the World Health Assembly between 2004 and 2009, he was also a chief negotiator of the resolution on sustainable health financing, universal coverage and social health insurance, passed in 2005.

=== World Health Organization ===
In October 2009, Krech returned to the World Health Organization, this time working at their headquarters in Geneva, Switzerland as the Director for Ethics, Equity, Trade and Human Rights, leading about 70 scientists and health professionals in developing innovative programs in those areas. In 2010, he was also appointed as a professor of global health at the College of Europe in Bruges, Belgium. He was part of the organizing committee for the World Conference on the Social Determinants of Health that took place in Rio de Janeiro, Brazil from 19–21 October 2011. The conference lead to the Rio Political Declaration, which was a commitment from member states to reduce health inequality and promote development.

In November 2013, he became the organization's Director for Universal Health Coverage and Health Systems at the office of the Assistant Director-General. He oversees its work in providing safe and effective medicines and health technologies, integrated people-centred health services, health financing and governance, health workforce, knowledge management, information, policy and research.

In 2019, he was appointed as Director for Health Promotion at the World Health Organization. He oversees WHO's work on tobacco and alcohol control, physical activity, health law and fiscal policies for health, healthy settings, health literacy, community engagement and wellbeing.

== Selected publications ==
- 2010: "Implications of the Adelaide Statement on Health in All Policies" (with N. Valentine, L. T. Reinders and D. Albrecht). Bulletin of the World Health Organization; Volume 88, Number 10
- 2011: "Tuberculosis: Still a Social Disease" (with M. Raviglione). International Journal of Tuberculosis and Lung Disease; Volume 15, Supplement 2
- 2011: "Action on Social Determinants of Health Is Essential to Tackle Non-Communicable Diseases" (with K. Rasanathan). Bulletin of the World Health Organization; Volume 89, Number 10
- 2011: "Social Determinants of Health: Practical Solutions to Deal with a Well-Recognized Issue". Bulletin of the World Health Organization; Volume 89, Number 10
- 2011: "Healthy Public Policies: Looking Ahead". Health Promotion International; Volume 26, Supplement 2, pages 268–272
- 2013: "Health Workforce Brain Drain: From Denouncing the Challenge to Solving the Problem" (with G. Cometto, K. Tulenko and A. S. Muula). PLOS Medicine; Volume 10, Issue 9
- 2013: "Human resources for universal health coverage: from evidence to policy and action" (with M. Sales, M. P. Kieny and C. F. Etienne). Bulletin of the World Health Organization; Volume 91, Number 11
- 2014: "Globale Gesundheitssteuerung und globale Steuerung für mehr Gesundheit". Gesundheits- und Sozialpolitik; Volume 68, pages 10–13
- 2014: "The 2014 Ebola Outbreak: Ethical Use of Unregistered Interventions" (with M. P. Kieny). Bulletin of the World Health Organization; Volume 92, Number 9
