= Janelia =

Historic house in Virginia, United States

- U.S. National Register of Historic Places
- Virginia Landmarks Register
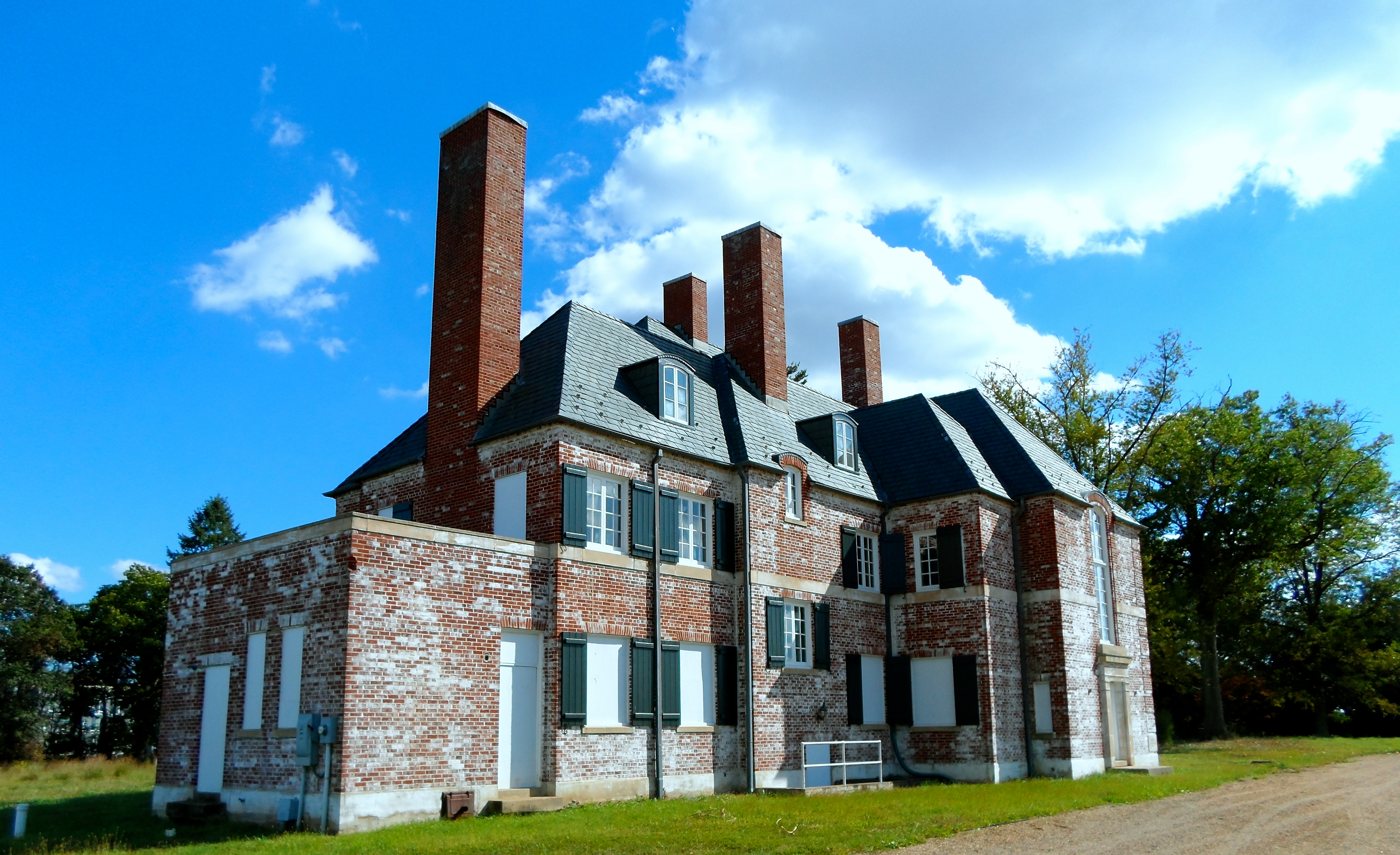
- Janelia Manor, September 2012

- Location within Northern Virginia Location within Virginia Location within the United States
- Nearest city: Ashburn, Virginia
- Coordinates: 39°04′10.48″N 77°27′57.84″W
- Area: 16.7 acres (6.8 ha)
- Built: 1936
- Architect: Philip L. Smith, Vinton L. Pickens
- Architectural style: Normandy Manor Style
- NRHP reference No.: 86003596
- VLR No.: 053-0084

Significant dates
- Added to NRHP: March 20, 1987
- Designated VLR: June 17, 1986

Janelia or Janelia Farm is a mansion and former farm near Ashburn, Virginia, built in 1936 for artist Vinton Liddell Pickens and her husband Robert Pickens, a journalist. The farm property has become the Janelia Research Campus of the Howard Hughes Medical Institute, which surrounds the house.

== Property ==
The 289-acre (117 ha) property was purchased in 1934 by Vinton and Robert Pickens, who were living at the time in Switzerland. Robert Pickens was a correspondent for the Associated Press and had written a book on current affairs in 1934, Storm Clouds over Asia. Vinton Pickens was a professional artist and chairman of Loudoun County's first planning commission, established in 1941. The property was named for the Pickenses’ daughters, Jane and Cornelia.

== Design ==
The house was designed by architect Philip Smith of the Boston firm of Smith and Walker in the Normandy Manor style at the specific requirement of Vinton Pickens, who wished to avoid references to Georgian and Federal style houses that were prevalent in the Loudoun County area. The house is unusual for the area, since it was more common for the affluent in Northern Virginia to remodel Georgian or Federal houses as the center of their estates, rather than to build new.

Smith designed the house in a French country-influenced modernist style, using a reinforced concrete structure faced with brick. The house is irregularly massed with hipped slate roofs, with six prominent chimneys and a number of dormers. The brick exterior was originally painted white, but has exhibited considerable weathering. The house is entered through a heavy, somewhat recessed wood door, with a service entrance to one side. The entrance hall is paved with rubber tiles resembling marble. A curving staircase leads to the second floor. A parlor opens off the entry hall through double doors, continuing on to French doors giving onto a screened porch overlooking the swimming pool. A large marble-faced fireplace dominates the parlor. Another set of double doors opens onto the dining room, with a view of the Potomac River through large windows. Another large fireplace dominates the dining room. A service corridor runs to the kitchen and pantries. The kitchen is outfitted with rubber tiles and has a modernistic design. A service stair is nearby, running from the basement to the third floor. Two offices are close to the service stair. The service wing contains a summer kitchen, a laundry, bathroom and further pantries.

The second floor is defined by a long corridor, leading to five bedrooms, all of which have fireplaces, and three of which have bathrooms. The master bedroom has views to the north and west. The third floor comprises the servants' quarters, with four bedrooms accessible by the service stair. A large bathroom and storage room complete the level. The basement includes a servants' recreation room, another servant's room, three storage rooms, a large library, a walk-in refrigerator and utility rooms.

== Howard Hughes Medical Institute at Janelia Farm ==
Janelia was placed on the National Register of Historic Places on March 20, 1987. The house is surrounded by the Janelia Research Campus of the Howard Hughes Medical Institute.
