= Francina Pubill =

Spanish footballer (born 1960)

Personal information
- Full name: Francina Pubill i Font
- Date of birth: 8 June 1960 (age 66)
- Place of birth: Olesa de Montserrat
- Position: Defender

Senior career*
Years	Team	Apps	(Gls)
1978–1983	Barcelona		
1983–1991	Barcilona		
1992–1997	Sabadell		
1997–2000	Espanyol		

International career
1985–1991	Spain	18	(1)
- * Club domestic league appearances and goals

Francina Pubill Font (born on 8 August 1960) is a Spanish former football defender.

She started her sports career as a basketball player for CB Olesa, Picadero JC and Club Cibes, but in 1983 she turned to football and she soon became a member of the 1983-founded Spanish national team, taking part in qualifying stages from the 1987 European Championship to the 1993 UEFA Euro. At club level she played for a decade for Peña Barcilona and later moved to CE Sabadell and RCD Espanyol following Barcilona's disbanding in 1991.

Her father died suddenly in April 1990, 24 hours before a Spanish representative championship match featuring Catalonia, which Pubill was set to represent; Pubill did not play the game, with Catalonia registering a disappointing result, albeit one that Mundo Deportivo felt should not have happened even with the absences of Pubill and the injured Kety Pulido.
