= Dave Lieberman =

American chef and physician (born 1980)

- Born: 1980 (age 45–46); Philadelphia, Pennsylvania, U.S.
- Education: Yale University; Warren Alpert Medical School
- Culinary career
- Cooking style: Budget cuisine, Fusion
- Television shows
- Good Deal with Dave Lieberman (2005-2007); Eat This with Dave Lieberman

Dave Lieberman (born 1980) is an American chef and physician. Lieberman was the host of the Food Network series Good Deal with Dave Lieberman and is a New York Times bestselling author.

== Early life ==
Lieberman attended The Philadelphia School and The Shipley School, before matriculating at Yale University. Campus Cuisine, his first cooking show at Yale, was a public-access television show that combined "sophisticated and accessible cooking with crazy college adventures." His show was featured on the cover of the In Dining section of The New York Times.

== Career ==
Lieberman's first book, Young & Hungry, was published in 2005. Soon after, he made People magazine's 50 Hottest Bachelors (June 27 issue). In October 2006, he published a second cookbook; Dave's Dinners: A Fresh Approach to Home-Cooked Meals.

On November 21, 2006, the Food Network premiered their first web-exclusive series, called Eat This with Dave Lieberman. Lieberman visits five United States cities uncovering trends and crazes in cuisine, including specialty meats, flavored salts, dessert bars and more. Lieberman also starred in the Yahoo! series In Search of Real Food, and in the PBS series, America's Heartland.

In 2007, Lieberman moved to Los Angeles but returned to New York City in 2008 to work with The New York Times health reporter, Anahad O'Connor, on their New York Times bestselling book, The 10 Things You Need to Eat, published in 2009.

=== Good Deal with Dave Lieberman ===
Good Deal with Dave Lieberman was a television cooking show hosted by Dave Lieberman that aired on the Food Network in the United States and Food Network Canada in Canada. The show premiered on Food Network on April 16, 2005. Lieberman's show presented affordable gourmet quality recipes.

=== Medical career ===
Lieberman went on to attend medical school at the Alpert Medical School of Brown University and graduated in 2016. Lieberman moved to Philadelphia to begin a career as an Internal Medicine physician at the Hospital of the University of Pennsylvania.
