= Arantza del Puerto =

Spanish footballer (born 1971)

Personal information
- Full name: María Arantzazu del Puerto Astiz
- Date of birth: 8 March 1971 (age 55)
- Place of birth: San Sebastián, Gipuzkoa
- Position: Defender

Youth career
- 1980–1984: Añorga KKE

Senior career*
Years	Team	Apps	(Gls)
1984–2005	Añorga KKE		

International career
1990–2005	Spain	71	(0)
- * Club domestic league appearances and goals

Arantza del Puerto Astiz (born 8 March 1971 in San Sebastián) is a Spanish former football defender. She played throughout her career for Añorga KKE, with which she won three national championships and three national cups between 1990 and 1996. Del Puerto is the second capped player for the Spanish women's national team to date with 71 caps, and she took part in the 1997 European Championship.

After retiring in 2005 she took a coaching licence along with other former players such as Pep Guardiola, Luis Enrique and Luis Milla. She coached the Basque national team in 2008, and she has also managed the women's teams of Zumaiako FT and Real Unión. She currently serves as a member of the Royal Spanish Football Federation's Women's Football Committee.
