= Tonono =

Spanish footballer

Personal information
- Full name: Antonio Afonso Moreno
- Date of birth: 25 August 1943
- Place of birth: Arucas, Spain
- Date of death: 9 June 1975 (aged 31)
- Place of death: Las Palmas, Spain
- Height: 1.75 m (5 ft 9 in)
- Position: Sweeper

Youth career
- Arucas

Senior career*
Years	Team	Apps	(Gls)
1962–1975	Las Palmas	379	(2)

International career
1967–1972	Spain	22	(0)
- * Club domestic league appearances and goals

Antonio Afonso Moreno (25 August 1943 – 9 June 1975), known as Tonono, was a Spanish professional footballer who played as a sweeper.

He appeared in 436 official matches for his only club, Las Palmas.

== Club career ==
Born in Arucas, Las Palmas, Gran Canaria, Tonono made his professional debut with hometown's UD Las Palmas, his first competitive appearance coming on 18 February 1962 at Real Murcia CF. His La Liga bow was in the 1964–65 season, playing 30 games as the Canary Islands team finished in ninth position; he would only represent one club in his career, being part of the squads that achieved three top-five finishes in the top flight – including a second place in 1969.

Tonono amassed top-tier totals of 313 matches and two goals. He made his last appearance on 31 May 1975 in a Copa del Rey tie against CD Málaga, contracting a viral infection shortly after and dying on 9 June at the age of 31 in Las Palmas.

== International career ==
Tonono made his debut for Spain on 1 October 1967 in an UEFA Euro 1968 qualifier against Czechoslovakia, a 1–0 loss in Prague in which the Himno de Riego was played before kick-off instead of that of Francoist Spain. He did not appear, however, in any major international tournament, as the national team did not qualify for any during his international spell.

In his 22nd and final cap, on 19 October 1972, Tonono acted as captain in a 2–2 draw with Yugoslavia for the 1974 FIFA World Cup qualifying campaign, in a game played in Las Palmas; he was the first player ever from the region to be selected for the national side.

== Honours ==
- Segunda División: 1963–64

== See also ==
- List of one-club men
