= Inmaculada Castañón =

Spanish footballer (born 1959)

Inma Castañón
Personal information
- Full name: María Inmaculada Matilde Castañón González
- Date of birth: 1959 (age 66–67)
- Place of birth: Cudillero, Asturias
- Position: Midfielder

Senior career*
Years	Team	Apps	(Gls)
1969–1970	Candás CF		
1970–1971	Sirenas de Luanco		
1972–1975	Camisas IKE		
1976–1988	Karbo Deportivo		
1988–1989	CFF Tradehi		

International career
1983–1988	Spain	17	(0)
1984–1987	Spain XI	2	(1)
- * Club domestic league appearances and goals

Inmaculada Castañón is a Spanish former international football midfielder who played for Karbo Deportivo and Spanish national team.

== Career ==
She was always an amateur and she had to retire from football when she was thirty due to injury and the pressure of playing. She turned down generous offers to play in Portugal or France but she gave her family priority.

== Honours ==
Karbo

- Copa de la Reina (3): 1983, 1984, 1985
- Copa de la Reina (unofficial editions) (2): 1981, 1982
- Copa Galicia (1): 1987
- Galician League (5): 1983, 1984, 1985, 1986, 1987
