= Suzie Grech =

Spanish footballer (born 1981)

Personal information
- Full name: Suzanne Grech Marcus
- Date of birth: December, 1981
- Place of birth: Narberth, Pennsylvania, U.S.
- Height: 1.80 m (5 ft 11 in)
- Position: Goalkeeper

Youth career
- 1996-2001: FC Delco
- 1994–2001: EPYSA Olympic Development Player
- 1999–2001: Region I ODP
- 1996–2000: The Shipley School

College career
Years	Team	Apps	(Gls)
2000–2003	Michigan Wolverines	65	

International career
1998–2000	Spain U18	14	
1998–2002	Spain	7	

Suzie Grech (born 1981) is an American-born Spanish footballer who played as a goalkeeper for the Spain women's national football team.

== Biography ==
Grech was born to a Spanish father from Mallorca and an American mother. She began playing soccer at the age of four and developed a passion for the sport through her family's deep footballing roots. Her paternal grandfather, Satur Grech, was a professional football manager in Spain who coached several clubs, including Sevilla, Mallorca, Ferrol, and Las Palmas. Grech has credited her grandfather as a major influence on her playing and coaching career.

Holding dual Spanish and American citizenship, Grech represented Spain at both the youth and senior international levels, earning 14 caps with the Spain U-18 national team and six appearances with the senior national team. She simultaneously built a successful collegiate career as a goalkeeper at the University of Michigan, where she became one of the most accomplished goalkeepers in program history. Following her playing career, she transitioned into coaching, spending more than a decade at the NCAA Division I level as both an assistant and head coach.

== Playing career ==
Youth and High School Career

She attended The Shipley School from 1996 to 2000, where she was a four-year varsity letterwinner in soccer and one of the most decorated student-athletes in school history. She earned First Team All-Main Line honors four consecutive years (1996–1999) and was named the 2000 Main Line Female Athlete of the Year, awarded annually to the top senior female athlete in the Philadelphia area. She also received Shipley's White Blazer Award as the school's Most Outstanding Senior Female Athlete in 2000.

In addition to soccer, she earned varsity letters in softball and basketball.

Club and Olympic Development Program

At the club level, she played for FC Delco from 1996 to 2001, helping lead the team to multiple state championships and regional success. FC Delco won the 1999 US Youth Soccer Region I Championship as undefeated U-17 champions and became the first girls' youth team from Pennsylvania to qualify for the US Youth Soccer National Championships.

She was named Tournament MVP of the 1999 Eastern Pennsylvania U-17 State Championships and was selected to the Elite Soccer Program (ESP) All-Star Team in 1999.

She also participated in the Pennsylvania Olympic Development Program (ODP) from 1994 to 2001 and was selected to the Region I ODP Team in 1999 and 2000.

University of Michigan

From 2000 to 2003, she played collegiate soccer for the Michigan Wolverines women's soccer. A goalkeeper, she became one of the most accomplished players in program history at the time.

During her career, Michigan advanced to the NCAA Elite Eight in 2002 and the NCAA Sweet Sixteen in 2003. She earned NSCAA All-Great Lakes Region Second Team, Soccer Buzz All-Great Lakes Region Second Team, and All-Big Ten Second Team honors in 2001.

She was selected Big Ten Defensive Player of the Week three times during her career and finished as Michigan's all-time leader in career goals-against average (1.05) while ranking among the program's leaders in wins (36) and shutouts (25). She appeared in 65 matches, making 57 starts, and compiled a career record of 36 wins, 18 losses, and 3 ties.

International Career

She represented Royal Spanish Football Federation at both the youth and senior international levels from 1998 to 2002.

At the youth level, she earned 14 caps with Spain's U-18 national team and helped the squad win the silver medal at the 1999–2000 UEFA Women's Under-19 Championship. She later earned six caps with the senior Spanish women's national team.

Semi-Professional Career

In 2002, she played for the Kansas City Mystics of the W-League's Western Conference. Competing alongside and against many of the top collegiate and international players in North America, she earned W-League Team of the Week honors during the season.

== Coaching career ==
After completing her playing career, Grech began coaching in 2004 as an assistant with the University of Michigan Women's Soccer Club. She went on to serve as an assistant coach at Marshall University from 2005 to 2006, where she worked primarily with goalkeepers while assisting with recruiting and player development. During her tenure, Marshall's women's soccer program earned a national academic ranking after posting a team GPA of 3.4 in 2006.

In 2007, Grech briefly served as a volunteer assistant coach for her alma mater, the University of Michigan women's soccer program, before joining Western Michigan University as an assistant coach later that year.

Grech was promoted to head coach of Western Michigan in April 2009. During her tenure, Grech oversaw one of the most successful stretches in program history, leading the Broncos to consecutive Mid-American Conference (MAC) Tournament Championship appearances in 2010 and 2011. Her 2011 squad finished 14–8, tying the school record for wins in a season and setting a program record with 12 shutouts. Western Michigan reached consecutive Mid-American Conference (MAC) Tournament Championship matches in 2010 and 2011, including the program's first championship game appearance since 2003. The 2011 team finished 14–8, tying the school record for wins in a season, earning a top-10 regional ranking, and setting a program record with 12 shutouts. Under her leadership, Western Michigan players earned numerous All-MAC, Academic All-MAC, and NSCAA Scholar All-Region honors, while the program received NSCAA Team Academic Awards.

Beyond the collegiate level, Grech was actively involved with the United States Olympic Development Program (ODP). She served as a Michigan State ODP head coach and staff coach from 2008 onward, working with elite youth players in the state's development pathway. She also served as a state and regional ODP evaluator.

In June 2012, Grech joined the University of Houston women's soccer staff as an assistant coach and was promoted to associate head coach in July 2013. Working primarily with the program's goalkeepers, she played a key role in Houston's return to postseason competition, helping guide the Cougars to a Conference USA Tournament berth in her first season—the program's first conference tournament appearance since 2010.

Under Grech's direction, Houston goalkeepers earned multiple conference honors and established several program milestones. In 2012, junior goalkeeper Cami Koski recorded four shutouts, raising her career total to 15 and becoming the all-time shutout leader in program history. During the 2013 season, Grech coached Koski to American Athletic Conference Goalkeeper of the Year honors and First Team All-Conference recognition. Koski also earned multiple American Athletic Conference Goalkeeper of the Week awards, while Houston goalkeepers combined for three weekly conference honors during the season.

Despite competing in the program's inaugural season in the American Athletic Conference, the Cougars proved highly competitive under the Houston coaching staff, recording several draws and one-goal contests against quality opposition, including scoreless road draws against San Diego State University and Houston Christian University. Grech's influence on goalkeeper development helped establish one of the strongest goalkeeping units in the conference and continued her reputation as a specialist in goalkeeper training and player development.

== Honors and awards ==
International

- Silver Medalist, UEFA Women's Under-19 Championship with Spain (1999–2000)
- Six caps for the Spain Women's National Team
- Fourteen caps for the Spain U-18 National Team

Collegiate

- NSCAA All-Great Lakes Region Second Team (2001)
- All-Big Ten Second Team (2001)
- Soccer Buzz All-Great Lakes Region Second Team (2001)
- Three-time Big Ten Defensive Player of the Week (2000–2002)
- NCAA Elite Eight (2002)
- NCAA Sweet Sixteen (2003)

Youth and High School

- Main Line Female Athlete of the Year (2000)
- White Blazer Award, The Shipley School's Most Outstanding Senior Female Athlete (2000)
- Four-time First Team All-Main Line (1996–1999)
- Region I Olympic Development Program Team (1999, 2000)
- Eastern Pennsylvania State Championship Tournament MVP (1999)

Coaching

- Led Western Michigan to consecutive Mid-American Conference Tournament Championship appearances (2010, 2011)
- Guided Western Michigan to a school-record-tying 14-win season and program-record 12 shutouts (2011)
- Coached American Athletic Conference Goalkeeper of the Year Cami Koski at Houston (2013)
