= Jesús Garay =

Spanish footballer

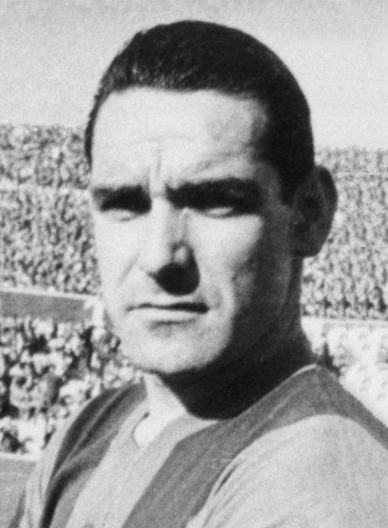
- Garay in 1962

Personal information
- Full name: Jesús Garay Vecino
- Date of birth: 10 September 1930
- Place of birth: Bilbao, Spain
- Date of death: 10 February 1995 (aged 64)
- Place of death: Bilbao, Spain
- Height: 1.80 m (5 ft 11 in)
- Position: Centre-back

Youth career
- 1945–1946: Santutxu
- 1946–1949: Begoña

Senior career*
Years	Team	Apps	(Gls)
1949–1950	Erandio	30	(1)
1950–1960	Athletic Bilbao	236	(7)
1960–1965	Barcelona	89	(3)
1965–1966	Málaga	16	(0)
Total		371	(11)

International career
1955	Spain B	1	(0)
1953–1962	Spain	29	(1)

Managerial career
- 1979: Basque Country
- * Club domestic league appearances and goals

Jesús Garay Vecino (10 September 1930 – 10 February 1995) was a Spanish footballer who played as a central defender.

He amassed La Liga totals of 341 games and ten goals over 16 seasons, representing mainly in the competition Athletic Bilbao (ten years) and Barcelona (five).

Garay appeared for Spain at the 1962 World Cup.

== Club career ==
Born in Bilbao, Biscay, Garay signed with local Athletic Bilbao in 1950 from neighbouring SD Erandio Club where he played as a forward. He was immediately cast into the team's starting XI, making his La Liga debut on 8 October 1950 in a 9–4 home win over RC Celta de Vigo and scoring his first goal in the competition on 17 December that year also at the San Mamés Stadium, against FC Barcelona (4–3 victory).

In summer 1960, having made 292 official appearances for Athletic and won five major titles, including the 1955–56 national championship and three Copa del Generalísimo trophies, claiming the 1958 edition of the latter tournament against Real Madrid at the Santiago Bernabéu Stadium, Garay joined Barcelona for 5,5 million pesetas, a fee that would later be used to build the Mercy stand at San Mamés, dubbed by club fans Jesús Garay. He retired at the age of 35 after a further five seasons in the top division, four with the Catalans and 1965–66 with CD Málaga, suffering relegation with the latter.

Garay died on 10 February 1995 in his hometown, aged 64.

== International career ==
Garay earned 29 caps for Spain in eight years, making his debut on 19 March 1953 in a 3–1 friendly win against Belgium in Barcelona. He was part of the squad that competed at the 1962 FIFA World Cup, featuring in the 1–0 group stage loss to Czechoslovakia.

=== International goals ===
#	Date	Venue	Opponent	Score	Result	Competition
1.	30 January 1957	Santiago Bernabéu, Madrid, Spain	Netherlands	1–0	5–1	Friendly

== Honours ==
Athletic Bilbao

- La Liga: 1955–56
- Copa del Generalísimo: 1955, 1956, 1958
- Copa Eva Duarte: 1950

Barcelona

- Copa del Generalísimo: 1962–63
