= Maider Castillo =

Spanish footballer (born 1976)

Maider Castillo Muga
Personal information
- Full name: Maider Castillo
- Date of birth: 3 August 1976 (age 50)
- Place of birth: Eibar, Spain
- Height: 1.61 m (5 ft 3 in)
- Position: Defender

Senior career*
Years	Team	Apps	(Gls)
1989–1999	Eibartarrak FT		
1998	Takarazuka Bunny		
1999–2001	AD Torrejón		
2001–2015	Levante UD		

International career
1996–2007	Spain	48	(1)
2006–2007	Basque Country	2	(0)
- * Club domestic league appearances and goals

Maider Castillo Muga (born 3 August 1976) is a Spanish former football defender, who most recently played for Levante UD of the Primera División. She also played briefly in Japan's L. League for Takarazuka Bunny.

She was a long-standing member of the Spain women's national football team, and played at the 1997 European Championship. She retired from football in 2015.

== Official international goals ==
- 2005 Euro qualification
  - 1 in Spain 9-1 Belgium
