= Judith Corominas =

Spanish footballer (born 1966)

Personal information
- Full name: Judith Corominas Serrats
- Date of birth: 10 November 1966 (age 60)
- Place of birth: L'Estartit, Spain
- Position: Defender

Senior career*
| Years | Team | Apps | (Gls) |
- Barcelona
| 1997–2001 | L'Estartit | | |

International career
| 1992–1998 | Spain | 25 | |
- * Club domestic league appearances and goals

Judith Corominas is a Spanish former international football defender who played for FC Barcelona.

== International career ==
Corominas was also part of the Spanish team at the 1997 European Championships that reached the semi-finals.

== Honours ==
Barcelona

- Copa de la Reina: 1994
