= Jesús Glaría =

Spanish footballer

Personal information
- Full name: Jesús Glaría Jordán
- Date of birth: 2 January 1942
- Place of birth: Villafranca, Spain
- Date of death: 19 September 1978 (aged 36)
- Place of death: Espluga de Francolí, Spain
- Height: 1.78 m (5 ft 10 in)
- Position: Midfielder

Youth career
- Oberena
- Atlético Madrid

Senior career*
| Years | Team | Apps | (Gls) |
| 1960–1968 | Atlético Madrid | 187 | (5) |
| 1968–1975 | Espanyol | 182 | (15) |
| Total | | 369 | (20) |

International career
| 1960 | Spain U18 | 3 | (1) |
| 1962–1969 | Spain | 20 | (0) |
- * Club domestic league appearances and goals

Jesús Glaría Jordán (2 January 1942 – 19 September 1978) was a Spanish footballer. He played for Atlético Madrid and RCD Espanyol. He retired from professional football in 1975 and, three years later, he died in a car accident with his son.

== Honours ==
Atlético Madrid

- UEFA Cup Winners' Cup: 1961–62
- Spanish League: 1965–66
- Spanish Cup: 1960–61, 1964–65
