= Sandra Vilanova =

Spanish footballer

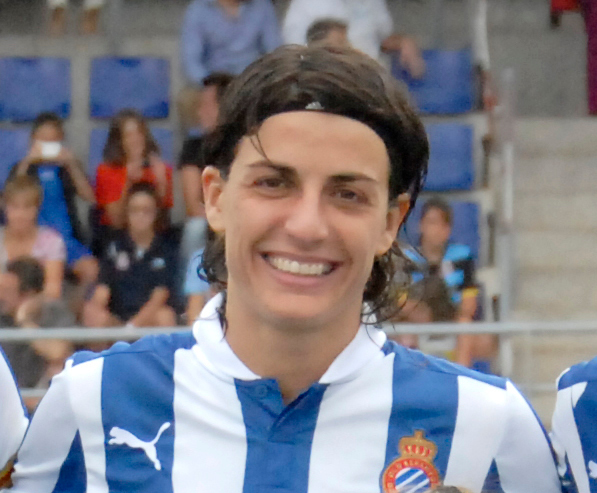
- With Espanyol in 2012

Personal information
- Full name: Sandra Vilanova Tous
- Date of birth: 1 January 1981 (age 45)
- Place of birth: Barcelona, Spain
- Height: 1.70 m (5 ft 7 in)
- Position: Midfielder

Team information
- Current team: Espanyol
- Number: 21

Youth career
- 1995–1997: UD Castellar

Senior career*
Years	Team	Apps	(Gls)
1997–2001	Platges Calvià		
2001–2009	Levante	146	(29)
2009–2010	Rayo Vallecano		
2010–2011	Espanyol		
2011–2012	Atlético Madrid	37	(5)
2012–2013	Espanyol	26	(1)
2014–2015	Espanyol	6	(0)

International career
- Spain U-19
2003–2013	Spain	46	(2)
- * Club domestic league appearances and goals

Sandra Vilanova Tous (born 1 January 1981) is a Spanish football midfielder who plays for RCD Espanyol of the Primera División. She previously played for Levante UD, Rayo Vallecano and Atlético Madrid, winning three league titles and five national cups. She also played the UEFA Women's Champions League with Levante and Rayo, and she was a member of the Spain women's national football team for a decade. She retired after captaining Spain in the 2013 European Championship, but made a comeback with Espanyol the following year.

== Club career ==
Vilanova was raised in UE Castellar, near Barcelona. In 1997, at 16, she started playing for CF Platges de Calvià, a low-tier team in the Balearic Islands. Four years later she signed for national champion Levante UD, where she spent most of her career. With Levante she won two championships and four national cups, and she made her UEFA Women's Cup debut.

After eight years in Valencia, in 2009 she moved to Madrid to play for reigning champions Rayo Vallecano. For the next three seasons she played successively for Rayo, RCD Espanyol and Atlético Madrid, winning her third league with Rayo and her fifth cup with Espanyol. In 2012, she returned to Espanyol.

After she brought her second spell at Espanyol to an end in June 2013, she announced her retirement days before the start of the following season. In December 2014 Vilanova emerged from retirement to rejoin Espanyol, but she suffered an anterior cruciate ligament injury in March 2015.

== International career ==
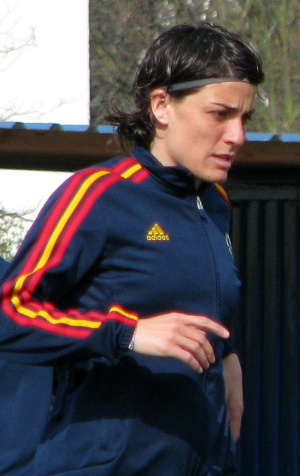

Vilanova made her debut for the Spain women's national football team since 2003, and she remained in Ignacio Quereda's plan for the following decade, serving as the team's captain. After Spain qualified for the 2013 European Championship following a hiatus of 16 years she was called up for the final tournament, where she played one of Spain's four games, losing her position in the midfield to Nagore Calderón and Vicky Losada in the other matches. As she announced her retirement she mentioned this as a disappointment that influenced her in taking that decision.

== International goals ==
No.	Date	Venue	Opponent	Score	Result	Competition
1.	10 November 2005	La Ciudad del Fútbol, Las Rozas de Madrid, Spain	Denmark	1–0	2–2	2007 FIFA Women's World Cup qualification
2.	27 October 2007	Stadion města Plzně, Plzeň, Czech Republic	Czech Republic	2–2	2–2	UEFA Women's Euro 2009 qualifying
