= Beatriz García (footballer) =

Spanish footballer

Beatriz Garcia
Personal information
- Full name: Beatriz Garcia Bernardo
- Date of birth: 23 April 1970 (age 56)
- Position: Midfielder

Senior career*
Years	Team	Apps	(Gls)
1983–1997	Añorga		
1997–1998	FC Barcelona		
1998–2002	CF Llers		

International career
1988–1998	Spain	33	(4)
1992	Spain XI	2	(1)
- * Club domestic league appearances and goals

Beatriz García Bernardo (born 23 April 1970) is a Spanish former international football midfielder who played for Añorga.

== Club career ==
Beatriz García started playing football at a 13 years old and began playing for Añorga a year later in the 1984-1985 season. She played continued playing for Añorga until the 1996–97 season. Where García transferred to FC Barcelona. She finally ended her career at CF Llers before retiring at 32. Overall Beatriz García won 3 División de Honor titles and 3 Copa de la Reina titles.

== International career ==
García was part of the Spanish team at the 1997 European Championships that reached the semi-finals.

== Honours ==
=== Club ===
Añorga

- División de Honor (3)
  - 1992, 1995, 1996
- Copa de la Reina
  - 1990, 1991, 1993
