= Rubiales case =

2023 controversy in Spain

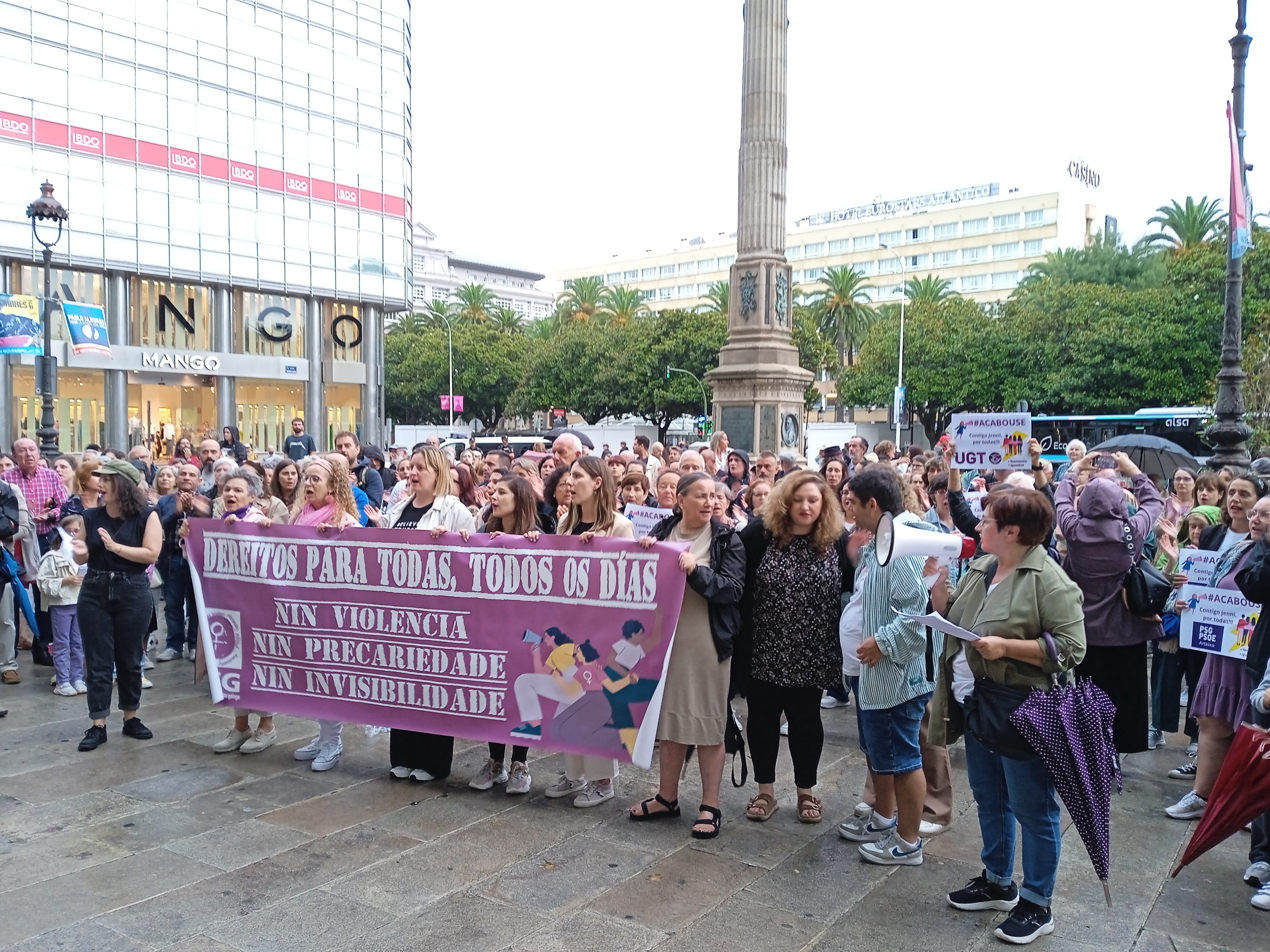
"#Acabouse" protest in A Coruña, Galicia, 28 August 2023

The Rubiales case (Spanish: caso Rubiales) refers to the behaviour of and the events that followed the actions of Luis Rubiales, the president of the Royal Spanish Football Federation (RFEF), during the 2023 FIFA Women's World Cup final. After allegations of inappropriate behavior during the 2023 FIFA Women's World Cup final on 20 August 2023, Rubiales' response was perceived by critics to have exacerbated the situation in the days following the tournament, and to have exacerbated the controversy. After an erratic speech he made on 25 August 2023, the entire Spain women's national football team withdrew from selection and several RFEF staff resigned; Rubiales was soon suspended from all football by FIFA and later found guilty.

There were widespread calls for Rubiales' resignation and structural change in the RFEF, paired with support for Jenni Hermoso – the player he had forcibly kissed on the lips at the final, and whom the RFEF was accused of mistreating following the incident – in Spain and from women's football teams around the world. The social movement caused by Rubiales' conduct and continued public denials of wrongdoing has been described as Spain's #MeToo movement; it quickly assumed the name #SeAcabó (lit. 'It's over'), from a tweet posted by Alexia Putellas after Rubiales' speech. Previous attempts by players using collective action to force improvements in the conditions of women's football in Spain have been either ignored or given outward but not systemic change.

The general unity of Spanish society in criticising Rubiales – including politicians from across the political spectrum – was considered unprecedented, as was the support of women's football from men's football players and teams. Rubiales subsequently resigned as president on 10 September 2023, later being banned from football-related activities for three years. A criminal complaint relating to alleged coercion is also being investigated.

== Background ==
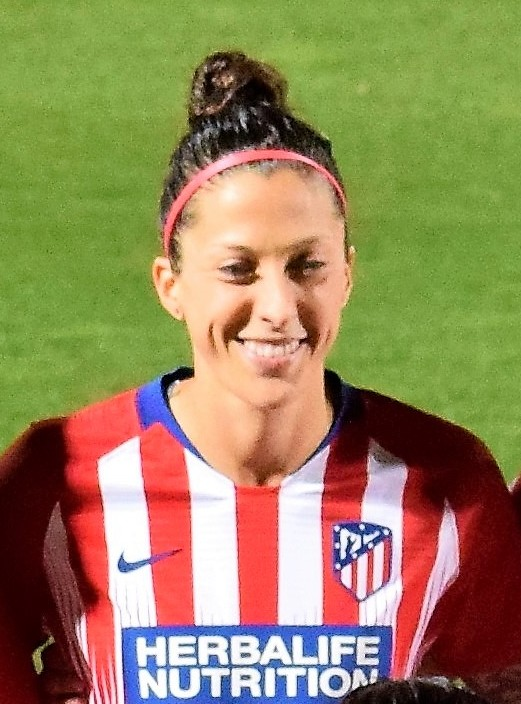
Jenni Hermoso was part of the 2015 squad that called for a change in culture of the team.

Women's football in Spain was officially recognised by the Royal Spanish Football Federation (RFEF) in 1980, after having been banned under the Franco dictatorship. The Spain women's national football team subsequently played its first official match in 1983. After various attempts to call out abuse under the previous head coach, Ignacio Quereda, a significant dispute involving the team broke out in 2022 over issues including the leadership of head coach Jorge Vilda, with 15 players withdrawing from selection.

The late 2010s and early 2020s also saw a number of high-profile public debates over sexual violence in Spanish society, with the government passing the "Only yes is yes" law in 2022. With women having very few rights during the Franco dictatorship, feminism in Spain has experienced rapid growth since; fourth-wave feminism in Spain developed in the 1990s. Largely academic in its beginnings, the fourth-wave movement gained momentum in wider society in 2018, with women's rights marches being well-attended and laws protecting these rights being passed. In terms of laws protecting women's rights, the rapid progress made since about 2018, when the social-democratic party PSOE regained power, placed Spain ahead of most of the world. Fourth-wave feminism in society and on social media emerged as a movement opposed to sexual violence, machismo, and rape.

Other teams involved in the 2023 FIFA Women's World Cup also reported issues of sexual violence, notably Zambia and Haiti.

== World Cup final ==
=== Incidents ===
External videos
- Clip of awards ceremony on Spanish TV showing the incident involving Hermoso Length: 0:16 Video credit: RTVE, El Independiente

On 20 August 2023, Spain won the 2023 Women's World Cup in a run that included winning a knock-out match for the first ever time and defeating England, the team that had sent them out of the Euro 2022, in the final hosted in Sydney, Australia. Following this match, there were several incidents of indecent behaviour on the part of then-RFEF president Luis Rubiales; the FIFA investigation identified four incidents, three relating to Spain players, and acknowledged two other issues relating to England players. Its decision report labels "the Genitals Incident" (a crotch grab in the authorities' box), "the Kiss Incident" (forcibly kissing Jenni Hermoso), "the Carrying Incident" (carrying Athenea del Castillo over his shoulder) and "the Peck Incident" (giving Olga Carmona "a peck on the cheek during [the] celebrations"). Testimony from Debbie Hewitt, the chair of the Football Association (FA), included in the decision report also said Rubiales "stroked" the face of Laura Coombs and gave a "forceful kiss" to Lucy Bronze.

After the final whistle, Rubiales was spotted grabbing his crotch while standing in the authorities' box near Queen Letizia and next to her 16-year-old daughter Infanta Sofía. On the pitch after the win, Rubiales lifted and carried player Athenea del Castillo over his shoulder. During the medal presentation, Rubiales forcibly kissed Spain's all-time top-scorer Jenni Hermoso on the lips after grabbing her by the head with both hands. Hermoso said shortly afterwards that she did not expect nor like the kiss when asked about why it happened, to Spanish radio and television, and in a social media video recorded in the locker room, saying "I didn't like it" then "but what am I supposed to do?" After this, Rubiales entered the players' locker room, reportedly throwing his arm around Hermoso and joking about marrying her in Ibiza.

The kiss was considered the main incident, due to its nature and because it was captured by the cameras of FIFA's official coverage as part of the live broadcast.

=== Responses ===
Rubiales was immediately heavily criticised by people from around the world. Besides considering the kiss both a form of sexual violence and an abuse of power, people in women's football and in Spanish society saw it as a reflection of persistent patriarchy in sports, a field where respect for women is considered harder to obtain. Sports journalists quickly denounced Rubiales' pattern of behaviour – El Confidencial's Alberto Ortega also noted Rubiales took the trophy off the players to celebrate with it – and, soon after, his responses, with the Daily Mirror's Colin Millar saying Rubiales' attempts to excuse and normalise his behaviour were further troubling.

Having initially described his critics as "idiots", "dickheads", and "losers" – and initially calling the incident "an unimportant gesture of affection" – on a Spanish radio show before leaving Australia, Rubiales published an apology video on 21 August, recorded while the delegation was on a layover returning from Australia; in it, he described the kiss as spontaneous and said that he had no bad intentions and was sorry for distracting from the celebration, saying: "I have to apologise, learn from this, and understand that when you are president you have to be more careful."

Spanish prime minister Pedro Sánchez said that Rubiales' behaviour was unacceptable and the apology was not adequate let alone sufficient, saying "the players did everything to win but Rubiales' behaviour shows that there is still a long way to go for equality"; labour minister and second deputy prime minister, Yolanda Díaz, called for Rubiales' resignation. Irene Montero, the equalities minister, said the kiss was an everyday form of sexual violence that women need to be protected from, with the sports minister, Miquel Iceta, also condemning it. Beyond the cabinet, political parties of all alignments criticised Rubiales, and Adrián Barbón, the President of the Principality of Asturias, said the kiss was "an abuse that neither the moment, nor the euphoria, nor the joy justifies". The Association of Spanish Footballers (AFE) issued an official communiqué stating that if Rubiales did not resign immediately, they would demand that the Ley de Deportes (a section on punishable conduct) be applied. The Unión General de Trabajadores (UGT) likewise called for resignation.

It was revealed on 22 August that Rubiales had "begged" Hermoso to appear with him in the apology video, and that manager Jorge Vilda unsuccessfully asked Hermoso's family several times to encourage her to support Rubiales. Team captain Ivana Andrés had also been asked to appear in the video: the RFEF considered her one of the players who saw them more positively and so may be more likely to comply, and hoped her presence would be interpreted as being on behalf of the whole squad. Andrés refused, later saying Rubiales was wrong. When Hermoso did not agree to the video, the RFEF sent a false statement in her name, downplaying the incident, to Spanish press agency EFE. (Note: In her testimony provided to FIFA, Hermoso said that she was made aware by the RFEF that they were planning to send a statement on her behalf before she was asked to record the video.) Hermoso issued a statement through her union, FUTPRO, saying that the union and her agency would represent her interests; Futpro released a statement saying that they were working on seeing Rubiales' act punished and sought to see "women footballers [protected] from actions that we believe are unacceptable". The RFEF threatened legal action against Futpro in response.

On 24 August, the FIFA Disciplinary Committee opened disciplinary proceedings against Rubiales.

== General Assembly speech and responses ==
The RFEF called an extraordinary general meeting for 25 August. Although Rubiales leaked to his close circle and the press that he would be resigning during the meeting, he instead recanted his words and vehemently refused to stand down. The speech was notably erratic; the next day Público journalist Esther Rebollo wrote in an article that she would not "repeat the phrases that [Rubiales] used to defend himself ... because rivers of ink have already been written about his unsportsmanlike, antisocial, ultra-sexist and even legally condemnable attitude." Goal described it as "career suicide".

Rubiales had brought his three daughters to the RFEF Assembly; he pointed them out, with part of his speech being delivered to them, saying "you [daughters] have to differentiate between truth and lies, and I [Rubiales] tell the truth." He also addressed Vilda, saying that he would offer him a new four-year contract worth €2 million. At another point, Rubiales repeated "I'm not going to resign" five times, compared to the "I'm not leaving" speech from The Wolf of Wall Street. In the speech, he referred to the kiss instead as "a peck", also saying it was "euphoric". He spent time recounting his version of events from the final, claiming to have had a full conversation with Hermoso and received her consent, though he continued to describe the kiss as "spontaneous". Other topics he postulated about in the speech were the rise of what he called "fake feminism" and how he saw it as the "scourge" of society, and the imprudence of the Spanish government, saying he would sue several ministers.

The speech was met with a standing ovation from members of the federation in the hall, who were criticised for this response. Also present were female members of coaching staff who had, according to 11 technical staff, been made to both attend and sit in the front row, to give the impression that Rubiales had support from women; the staff gave a statement afterwards, criticising this.

Rebollo felt that Rubiales' attacks on women and support of his male colleagues in the speech was a key point in causing male onlookers across Spain and the world to be "embarrassed, hurt and angry", and to embrace support for Hermoso, the women's team, and ultimately feminism. Sports media consumed by male football fans also generally criticised Rubiales. Sports journalists, particularly those familiar with Spanish women's football, responded to the speech by placing it and Rubiales within the "systematic issue[s]" that Spain and other women's teams face; freelance journalist Alex Ibaceta lamented in The Guardian that it took a World Cup victory for the team to receive enough attention that Rubiales "simply being himself" on camera could "give a taste to the world of what has been going on behind the scenes for decades at the Spanish federation".

In response to the speech, two Spanish men's national team and Real Betis players, Héctor Bellerín and Borja Iglesias, publicly denounced Rubiales on social media, with the latter also refusing to play for Spain until Rubiales resigned. Two former Spain national goalkeepers, David de Gea and 2010 World Cup winner Iker Casillas, also criticised Rubiales' speech on Twitter. Spain was in the final stages of bidding to co-host the 2030 FIFA World Cup; following the speech it was widely understood that they would not be awarded the tournament if Rubiales remained in charge. Global players' union FIFPRO, having already called for action against Rubiales, published a further statement in support of Hermoso and denouncing Rubiales, which was shared by many players. Beatriz Alvarez, the president of Spain's Liga F, told RTVE that Rubiales' "ego is above his dignity" but she was still shocked by the speech and how "every time he speaks he shows what kind of person he really is." Hermoso plays club football in Mexico in the Liga MX Femenil, with many of these clubs announcing their support. The Spain national team sponsors Iberia and Iberdrola also issued statements criticising Rubiales' actions.

Nine football officials resigned from their RFEF roles either before the speech, if they were warned, or following it; (Note: They were: Rafael del Amo, President of the Navarre Football Federation and Head of the National Women's Football Committee; Javier Landeta, President of the Basque Football Federation and member of the Board of Directors of the RFEF; José Ángel Peláez, President of the Cantabrian Football Federation; Salvador Gomar, President of the Valencian Community Football Federation and Vice President of the RFEF; José Juan Arencibia, President of the Canarian Football Federation; Itziar Díaz, Head of the Women's Football Committee of the Riojan Football Federation; Manu Díez, Head of the RFEF Assembly General and President of the Guipuzcoana Football Federation; Joan Soteras, President of the Catalan Football Federation and Vice President of the RFEF; Jon Uriarte, member of the Board of Directors of the RFEF) at least 21 teams from La Liga, Liga F, and the Segunda División called for Rubiales' removal or resignation. (Note: They were: Real Madrid, Barcelona, Athletic Bilbao, Sevilla, Valencia, Celta Vigo, Osasuna, Cádiz, Alavés, Granada, Real Sociedad, Girona, Villarreal, Real Betis, Mallorca, Las Palmas, Racing de Santander, Sporting de Huelva, UDG Tenerife, Espanyol, and Getafe.)

The first female football player to respond to the speech was Alexia Putellas, Spain's most-capped women's international and the most-decorated individual women's footballer in the world. She tweeted "This is unacceptable. It's over. With you, teammate [Jenni Hermoso]". (Note: Latin: "Esto es inaceptable. Se acabó. Contigo compañera [Jenni Hermoso]".) This was followed by an influx of similar expressions on social media from women's footballers around the world. Influenced by the speech, former, current, and eligible players for the Spain women's team organised in a WhatsApp group, choosing to challenge the RFEF. Later that day, 81 players, including all 23 from the Women's World Cup-winning squad, released a joint statement to boycott the national team until the RFEF changes leadership; on 2 September, Sánchez praised the team for the boycott, saying that they had won twice: first the World Cup, and then by "giving the world a lesson in equality". Hermoso followed up the joint statement on 25 August with a full personal statement later that day, accounting her experience of the incidents as well as mentioning previous and ongoing abuses in the environment of the national squad.

Most of the coaching staff of the women's national teams, not including senior team manager and Rubiales ally Vilda, resigned en masse on 26 August in protest of Rubiales' conduct. (Note: They were: Montse Tomé Vázquez, Assistant coach of the women's senior national team; Javier Lerga Garayoa, Assistant coach of the women's senior national team; Eugenio Gonzalo Martín, Assistant coach of the women's senior national team and Head coach of the women's under-17 and under-16 national teams; Blanca Romero Moraleda, Physical trainer of the women's senior national team; Carlos Sánchez García, Goalkeeping coach of the women's senior national team; Rubén Jiménez Gómez, Technical analyst of the women's senior national team; Sonia Bermúdez Tribano, Head coach of the women's under-19 and under-20 national teams; Javier Velázquez Díaz, Physical trainer of the women's youth national teams; Javier Egido Saz, Technical analyst of the women's youth national teams; Ander Ruíz Mitxelena, Goalkeeping coach of the women's youth national teams; Elena Fernández Castaño, Goalkeeping coach of the women's youth national teams) (Note: Names written as they appear on the letter)

81 signatories – player withdrawals on 25 August
Names in bold with an asterisk (*) are the active eligible players who signed the further statement on 15 September; additionally, **Inma Gabarro** * † and **Jana Fernández** * signed this.
Names in italics with a dagger (†) are players who were called up to either the senior or under-23 squads on 18 September.

- **Jennifer Hermoso** *
- **Alèxia Putellas** * †
- **Maria Isabel Rodríguez** * †
- **Irene Paredes** * †
- **Ona Batlle** * †
- **Mariona Caldentey** * †
- **Teresa Abelleira** * †
- **María Pérez** * †
- **Catalina Coll** * †
- **Aitana Bonmatí** * †
- **Laia Codina** *
- Claudia Zornoza
- **Oihane Hernández** * †
- **Rocío Gálvez** *
- **Irene Guerrero** *
- **Alba Redondo** *
- Athenea del Castillo †
- **Eva Navarro** * †
- **Enith Salón** * †
- **Ivana Andrés** *
- **Olga Carmona** * †
- **Esther González** * †
- **Salma Paralluelo** *
- **Elene Lete** *
- **Fiamma Benítez** *
- **Marta Cardona** *
- **Maite Oroz** *
- **Patricia Guijarro** * †
- **Lola Gallardo** *
- **Nerea Eizagirre** *
- **Ainhoa Moraza** *
- **Maria León** * †
- **Sandra Paños** *
- **Claudia Pina** * †
- **Amaiur Sarriegi** * †
- **Leila Ouahabi** *
- **Laia Aleixandri** * †
- **Lucia García** * †
- **Andrea Pereira** *
- Vero Boquete
- Ainhoa Tirapu
- Sandra Vilanova
- Ana Romero "Willy"
- Silvia Meseguer
- Nagore Calderón
- Marta Torrejón
- Lucía Rodríguez
- Vicky Losada
- Carmen Arce "Kubalita"
- Priscila Borja
- Natalia Pablos
- Susana Guerrero
- Larraitz Lucas
- Isabel Benito "Chabe"
- Amanda Sampedro
- Isabel Fuentes
- Elisabet Sánchez
- Mari Paz Azagra
- Vanesa Gimbert
- Virginia Torrecilla
- Leire Landa
- Elisabet Ibarra
- Isi Gavilán "Isi"
- Toña Is
- Meli Nicolau
- Gurutze Fernandez
- Auxi Jiménez
- Vanesa Moreno "Vane"
- Roser Serra
- María Goñi
- Marta Moreno
- Eli Capa
- Maria Teresa Andreu
- Mar Prieto
- María José Perez
- María Marco "Beni"
- Paula Kasares
- María Luisa Monzón "Gusa"
- Nines Pérez Urda "Quilla"
- Angela Martín Martín
- Victoria Hernandez

== Investigations and sanctions by sporting bodies ==
=== Spain ===
==== Rubiales ====
On 22 August, the Spanish domestic women's league, Liga F, filed a complaint with the government sports council, Consejo Superior de Deportes (CSD), asking for Rubiales' dismissal and describing him as an "unprecedented international embarrassment".

The Spanish government said that they would seek Rubiales' dismissal if he did not resign; on 25 August, due to Rubiales' speech in which he said he would not step down, the Spanish government filed a complaint in the Sports Administrative Court (TAD) for "serious misconduct", with the aim of obtaining authorisation to suspend him from his duties.

After a preliminary investigation, the TAD decided on 1 September that Rubiales' misconduct was "serious" but not "very serious"; he would not be immediately removed from office, with the TAD deciding to open a full investigation of Rubiales. In response, Rubiales shared an "explosive" letter on Twitter saying that he had already proven his innocence (through RFEF communiques calling Hermoso a liar) and would "prove the truth", as well as claiming that he was advancing feminism and saying he felt that the media were "lynching" him by "marginalising" him in their reporting.

The TAD investigation was suspended on 8 September when the criminal complaint was filed, to allow for the higher court to investigate first.

==== Vilda and other RFEF staff ====
After the coaching staff of the Spain women's national team resigned, Vilda's position as coach became untenable. He was fired on 5 September. On 7 September he threatened legal action against the RFEF, saying he considered Rubiales' renewal offer during the 25 August speech to be a legal agreement.

Vilda's assistant coach, Montserrat Tomé, who had resigned, was appointed the new head coach, the first woman to hold the position. On 12 October, Vilda distanced himself from Spanish football after accepting a new job as head coach of the Moroccan women's team.

In the aftermath of the World Cup and Rubiales' resignation, RFEF also dispensed with the services of Andreu Camps (RFEF secretary-general and Rubiales' right hand), Miguel García Caba (responsible for the area of integrity within Rubiales' staff), Lydia Valentín (holding a Rubiales-appointed 'ghost' position in the RFEF Observatory of Equality), and Pablo García-Cuervo (RFEF director of communications).

=== FIFA ===
On 26 August, two days after commencing their investigation, FIFA suspended Rubiales until 24 November. The suspension decision document explains that they took this step due to the fallout from Rubiales' incendiary speech and to uphold the FIFA statute of ensuring women's football is welcoming to all, saying that striking Spain players may feel more comfortable returning to the team without the possibility of Rubiales being there.

On 30 October 2023, the FIFA Disciplinary Committee banned Rubiales from engaging in any football-related activities at both national and international levels for three years. On 17 November 2023, the legal panel that oversees sports in Spain issued a similar three-year ban which barred him from being employed with the sport while in Spain.

=== UEFA ===
Rubiales was a vice president of the European football governing body UEFA at the time, and a friend of its president, Aleksander Čeferin. The RFEF requested that UEFA suspend the RFEF due to what it called "government interference" after the government referred Rubiales to the TAD. If UEFA had done so, it would have prevented Spanish national teams and club teams from participating in the European Championship and Champions League (among other tournaments); the self-sabotage was said to highlight how irreparably deep the RFEF's loyalty to Rubiales was.

Despite increasing pressure to comment on Rubiales and open its own investigation, neither UEFA as an organisation nor any of its representatives did so publicly until the UEFA ceremony on 31 August; Čeferin spoke only to L'Équipe, and said only that UEFA felt no need to deal with the matter as FIFA was already doing so. He also said that he thought Rubiales had been "inappropriate"; this description was considered weak, especially considering how unequivocal Čeferin had been in criticising Andrea Agnelli for organising the European Super League. It was reported in The Athletic that privately, however, UEFA officials were very displeased by Rubiales and that they considered his speech so serious that they would not "quietly [find him] a job elsewhere in the game".

=== Rubiales resignation ===
On 10 September, a preview clip for the British talk show Piers Morgan Uncensored was released, with Rubiales being interviewed by broadcaster Piers Morgan. In it, Rubiales said he had offered his resignation to the RFEF. Shortly after the clip, Rubiales shared a statement saying he had resigned from his positions in the RFEF and UEFA.

The written statement did not include an apology or suggestion of wrongdoing, and did not mention Hermoso or the women's team, considered in keeping with Rubiales' attitude; it did feature various explanations for the resignation, including saying his daughters were suffering. He described his daughters, father, and friends telling him "to focus on [his] dignity and to continue [his] life". He also wrote that he did not want Spanish football to suffer because of him, only invoking the 2030 Men's World Cup bid. According to Ibaceta, Rubiales was only concerned with how his presence or absence would affect men's football, and that he alluded to only agreeing to resign if the federation does not significantly change from his plans for it.

== Motril hunger strike ==
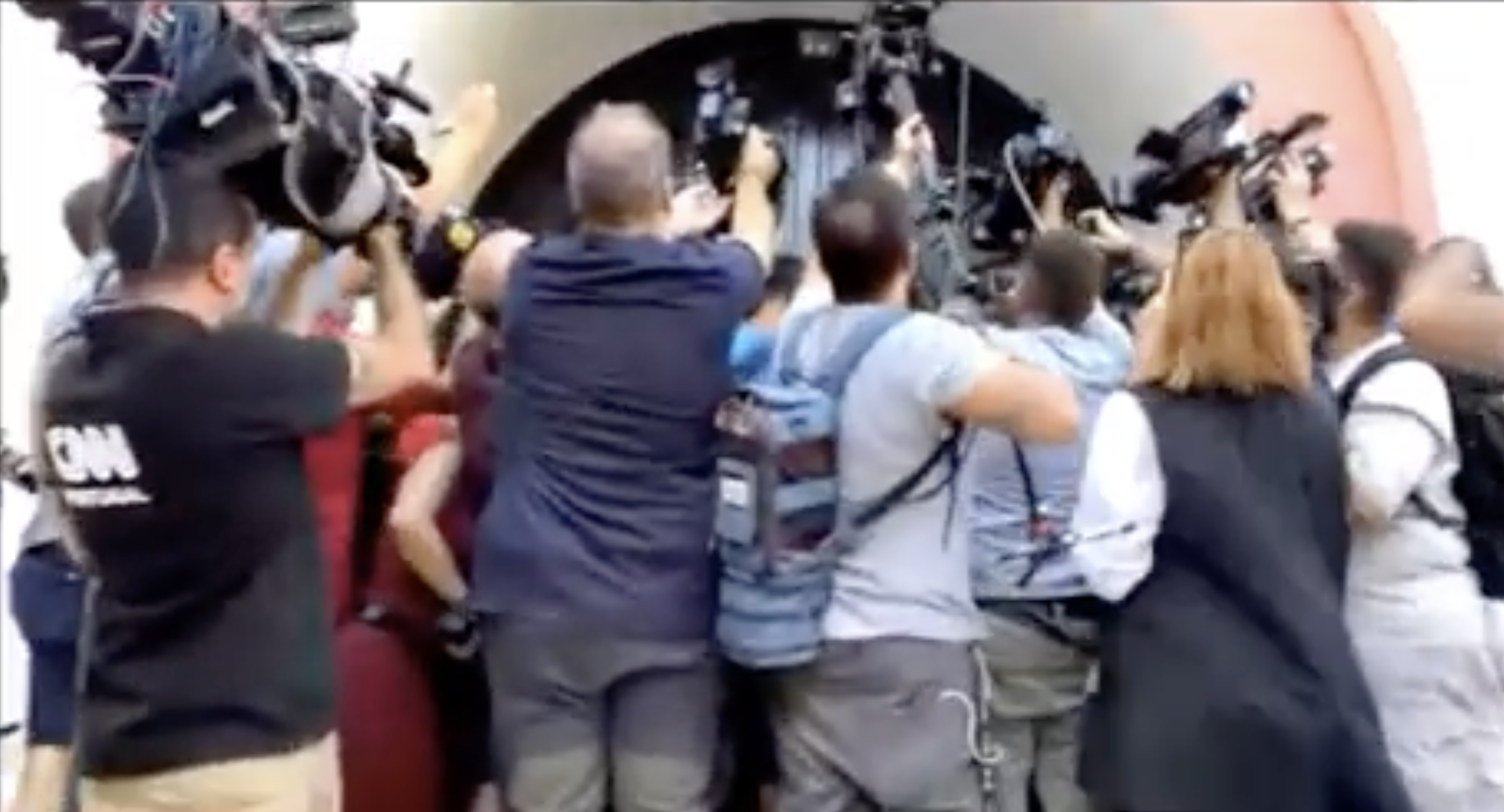
Journalists gathered outside the church in Motril on 29 August

On 28 August, Rubiales' mother, Ángeles Béjar, stayed inside the Divina Pastora church in Motril after service, announcing that she was going on hunger strike as a protest against the "inhumane and bloodthirsty hunt" against her son. She persistently defended Rubiales as a decent person, saying he was treated unfairly. Attention on Béjar focused on the increasing absurdness of attempts to defend Rubiales; the potential that Rubiales was using his family to apply social pressure to Hermoso after being prohibited from contacting her; and the tendency for female relatives, particularly mothers, to disbelieve that their sons can be abusers. Two days later, Béjar was reportedly admitted to hospital with fatigue and anaemia.

== Legal action and investigations ==
The Prosecution Ministry opened preliminary investigations into whether Rubiales' actions constituted sexual assault on 28 August, including offering Hermoso the opportunity to make a formal complaint. She did this on 6 September. On 8 September, the Prosecutors presented a criminal complaint to the National Court, asking for an investigation into charges of sexual assault and coercion. It also asked for information to be gathered from Australian authorities.

During evidence gathering for the coercion charge, the Prosecutors changed the status of former women's national team coach Jorge Vilda, the director of the men's national team Albert Luque, and the RFEF's marketing director Rubén Rivera, from witnesses to suspects on 27 September 2023. Vilda was summoned to testify on 9 October. On 28 September, RFEF press officer Patrica Perez told the Spanish National Court that the Federation coerced her into trying to release a joint statement from Rubiales and Hermoso. Evidence-gathering testimonies from Hermoso and Perez regarding the coercion charge took place in November 2023.

Rubiales was separately arrested on corruption charges as part of Operation Brody on 3 April 2024, having been staying outside of the country.

The court case for sexual assault and coercion began on 3 February 2025. On 20 February, Rubiales was convicted of sexual assault but was acquitted of coercion. He was ordered to pay a fine of €10,800 (£8,942), and was ordered to stay at least 200 meters away from Hermoso and to not contact her for 12 months. Vilda, Rivera and Luque were cleared on the coercion charges. His appeal against the ruling was rejected by the Audiencia Nacional along with a request by the prosecution for a retrial on 25 June 2025.

== #SeAcabó ==
Alexia Putellas
(@alexiaputellas)
tweeted:

Spanish:

Esto es inaceptable. Se acabó. Contigo compañera @Jennihermoso [Jenni Hermoso]

Translation:

This is unacceptable. It's over. With you, teammate @Jennihermoso

25 August 2023"Alexia Putellas via Twitter" (in Spanish).

In her Medalla d'Honor del Parlament de Catalunya acceptance speech on 13 September 2023, Putellas said that the players would continue to fight for the protections of women.

A wider anti-sexual violence, anti-machismo, and pro-women's equity movement in society and sports developed out of the Rubiales affair. Based on a tweet from Alexia Putellas, the movement is known by its hashtag call #SeAcabó (in Spanish; "S'ha acabat" in Catalan, "Acabouse" in Galician, "It's over" in English). With the Spain women's football players hoping to use their collective voice to force deep systemic change in the RFEF, to make it less sexist and more equitable for women in football, #SeAcabó additionally became an outlet for women in Spain to speak up about sexual harassment and everyday sexism they experienced. It became a movement focused on preventing sexual violence committed by "powerful men and abusive bosses", with academic Marta Soler Gallart writing in The Conversation that it could help de-normalise sexual violence and the social isolation of victims. Other commenters defined #SeAcabó in contrast to #MeToo: journalists for El País wrote that the focus of #SeAcabó was to expose "less obvious" everyday sexism that "demonstrates gender dominance" in society, while feminist writer Cristina Fallarás told the NOS that #SeAcabó was not unheard victims speaking out but survivors who "want to show the world that this should never happen again."

The sports journalist Esperanza Balaguer felt that "se acabó" as a phrase is powerful, that "Me Too was very much necessary, but now we have to be more decisive." The #MeToo movement had not had lasting effects in Spain, and though the hashtag #Cuéntalo (lit. 'Tell It') was used after the landmark La Manada rape case decided in 2018, this was always more popular in Latin America than Spain. With growing feminism and the fallout of the La Manada case, Spain reformed its consent laws in 2022, to not assume consent by default. Global media considered #SeAcabó Spain's own #MeToo; the hashtag #SeAcabó had begun trending on Twitter on 26 August. Patricia Moreno Barberá of Vogue opined that it made sense for Spain's movement to come from football, which she wrote has a similar presence in Spanish society as Hollywood does in the United States.

Given a platform with #SeAcabó, women across Spain spoke up about the micromachismos they experienced within professional environments; micromachismos are seen as a normalised form of gender dominance, things that "women are expected to put up with in the workplace" but which can have negative effects on their careers and cause psychological harm. Among the female professionals denouncing this form of abuse were female sports journalists in Spain, many of whom wrote about an inability of sports media to expose machismo in women's sports because it was normalised by male colleagues.

Signs of support for Hermoso under the #SeAcabó banner were held up by football teams, both women's and men's, and their fans during matches, and there were protests held by feminist groups across Spain in the days following Rubiales' speech. A protest in Callao Square, the centre of Madrid, on 28 August was attended by around 800 people, shutting down the area. A day of action was called for 1 September by feminist groups in Spain. A further statement of support from FIFPro was released on this day and shared on social media by past and present women's footballers it represents from across 66 countries. There were protests in cities across Spain, and The Local made "se acabó" its Spanish word(s) of the day. While Rubiales had initially retained support in his hometown of Motril, with a few dozen counter-protestors showing support for him while his mother was on hunger strike, a feminist protest against him took place there on 1 September, too; this protest was livestreamed.

The Ministry of Equality campaign for International Day for the Elimination of Violence against Women on 25 November 2023 was titled "Ahora ya España es otra" ("Now Spain is different"), a paraphrased lyric from the successful 1978 song "Se acabó" by flamenco singer María Jiménez, who had died in September. The accompanying video prominently featured a young girl with a football and wearing a red '10' shirt, Hermoso's Spain number, while a printed advertisement made references to Rubiales' deflections in the context of his attitude no longer being tolerable in Spain. It had been noted when Jiménez died that the song had been the previous major usage of the phrase as feminist, being about domestic abuse, though it was considered unlikely that it might have influenced Putellas' choice of words.

== International reactions ==
=== Football ===
Former Australia men's footballer Craig Foster spoke out soon after the kiss, tweeting that FIFA and the RFEF should remove Rubiales and expressing his outrage that "Women in sport are daily subject to an extreme power differential, objectification, harassment, sexual abuse and an absence of agency and power". Following Rubiales' speech, Foster also called on all members of the Spain men's national team to join the women's team in striking.

Other women's football players from around the world spoke out in support for Hermoso, both individually and collectively. The England women's team, who faced Spain in the final in Sydney, issued a statement of support, and players of the National Women's Soccer League wore wristbands with supportive messages on.

During the UEFA ceremony on 31 August 2023, when the major UEFA Football Awards were awarded, both Aitana Bonmatí of Spain (winner of the UEFA Women's Player of the Year Award) and Sarina Wiegman (manager of England, Spain's opponents in the World Cup final, and winner of the UEFA Women's Coach of the Year Award) dedicated their awards to Hermoso and spoke about stopping abuse in women's football. After accepting her award, Wiegman put it on the ground to instead lead a round of applause for the Spanish players. Bonmatí's acceptance speech was more directly critical of Rubiales than Wiegman's, and she had not told UEFA what she would say beforehand; the presenters asked her before she went on stage whether she would speak English or Spanish and if she wanted them to ask her about Rubiales, to which she replied that she had something she wanted to say. Bonmatí spoke in English for all of the ceremony except when talking about Rubiales, both on stage and in the press room; this was seen as her choosing to address these comments for an exclusive Spanish audience, so that people in Spain would understand her as she showed that she was not backing down.

=== Outside football ===
While promoting his film Coup de chance at the Venice Film Festival, American director Woody Allen gave his support to Rubiales, saying "it was only a kiss" and that public affection should not, in his view, be punishable. The film premiere was met with protestors due to allegations of sexual abuse against Allen.

== See also ==
- 2023 Indian wrestlers' protest
- 2024–2026 Spanish sexual misconduct allegations
- It's All Over: The Kiss That Changed Spanish Football
