= SeAcabó =

#SeAcabó may refer to:

- #SeAcabó, a social movement, particularly in women's football, spurred by the Rubiales case
- #SeAcabó: Diario de las campeonas, the 2024 Spanish documentary film about disputes involving the Spain women's national football team
