= Disputes involving the Spain women's national football team =

Issues involving Spain's WNT

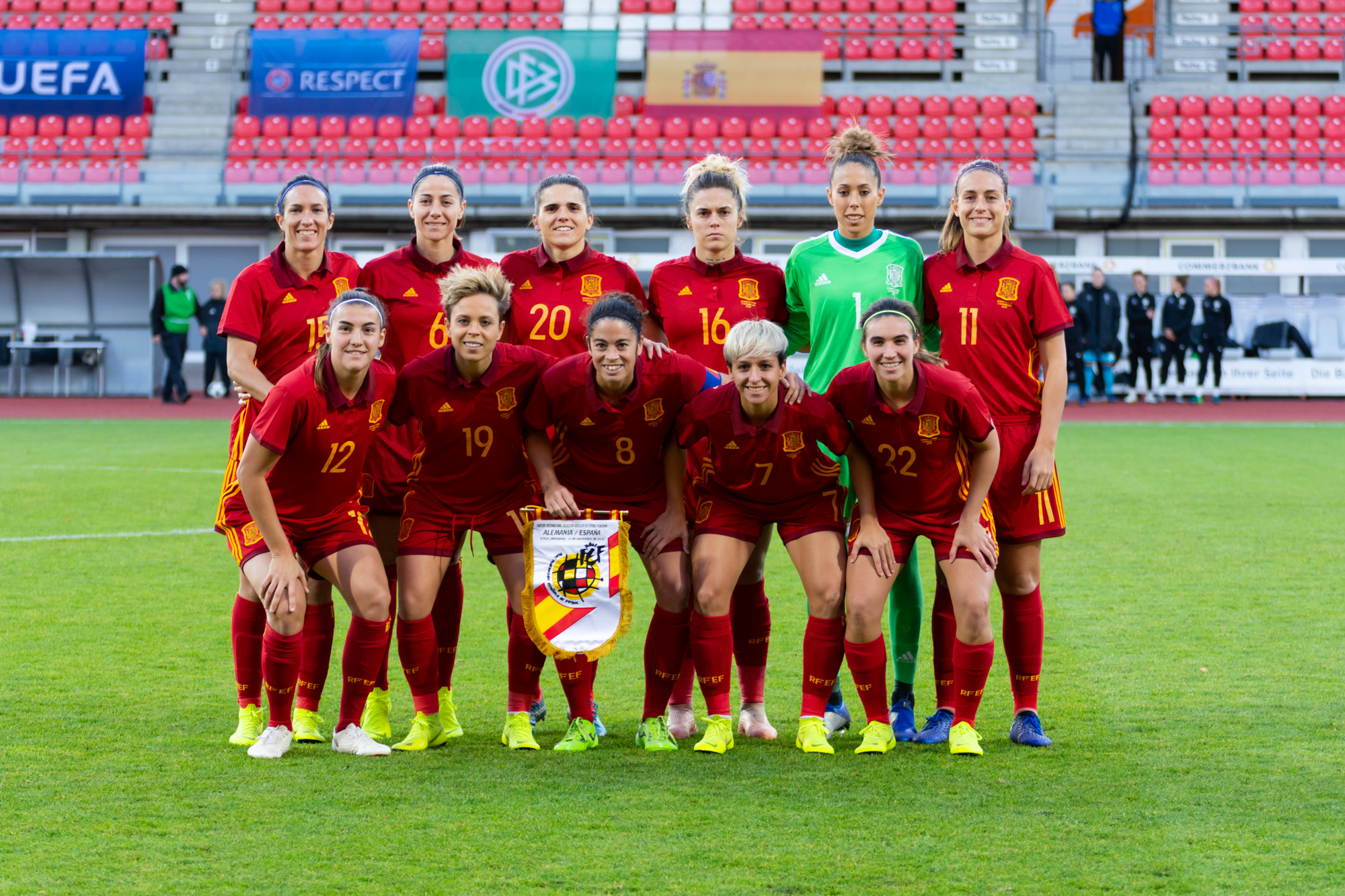
Spain women's national team in 2018

The Spain women's national football team has been involved in public disputes, primarily when its players have advocated for improvements and spoken against the national federation (RFEF). For most of its history, the team has had few, long-serving, managers, with the culture of the team under their instruction criticised.

On four occasions, members of the team have called for institutional change in the conditions of the national team: first in 1996, once after placing bottom of their group at the FIFA Women's World Cup in 2015, again in 2022, and the latest in 2023 immediately after winning the World Cup. Lola Gallardo and Sandra Paños were the only players signatory to each dispute between 2015 and 2023, with Alexia Putellas, Irene Paredes and Jennifer Hermoso also significantly involved.

Gallardo and Paños were considered retired by the RFEF after the third dispute. The unsettled tensions came to a head when Spain won the 2023 World Cup. During the medal presentation at this event, RFEF president Luis Rubiales kissed Hermoso on the lips without consent, causing global outcry and a rapid examination of the conditions the players had complained about; five days later, 81 players signed a letter denouncing abuse in the RFEF and saying they would not play for Spain again until its leadership changed.

== 1996: First request for Quereda's removal ==
Ignacio "Nacho" Quereda became the second coach in Spain national team history when he replaced Teodoro Nieto in 1988. Quereda was appointed by María Teresa Andreu, the then-President of the National Committee for Women's Football (CNFF), to replace Nieto. Quereda was manager of the Spain women's national football team between 1988 and 2015, as well as manager of the Spain women's national under-19 football team between 2002 and 2005. The team hadn't qualified for any major international tournament until 1996, when they qualified for the UEFA Women's Euro 1997.

On 12 May 1996, Spain drew 1-1 with Sweden in a must-win match in 1997 UEFA Women's Euro qualifying. The players, frustrated with the direction of the national team, met in a room in the Wisby Hotell in Visby, Sweden, and drafted a five-page long letter denouncing Quereda and requesting his dismissal for both "humane" and "sporting" reasons. According to Andreu, the players presented their letter to Quereda, and he brought it to her and Ángel Villar, the RFEF president and Quereda's loyal friend. Villar refused to fire him despite the complaints in the letter. Beatriz García, the team's captain, and Begoña Jáuregui, the player who wrote the letter, were both removed from the national team shortly after the Euro 1997 campaign. Many players willingly left the national team setup shortly before and after the 1997 Euros, with some players even choosing to retire from football completely. Teresa Andreu submitted her final resignation from the CNFF in 1998 after multiple attempts at convincing Villar to fire Quereda.

The 1996 letter was kept in a scrapbook of an anonymous Spain national team player. It came to public knowledge for the first time in 2015 following the requested removal of Quereda after the 2015 FIFA Women's World Cup.

== 2011–2015: continued complaints under Quereda ==
With a continued poor qualification record into major tournaments and a coaching staff that went unchanged for two decades, players publicly accused the Royal Spanish Football Federation (RFEF) of indifference towards the women's team by at least 2011. This year, former Spain international Laura del Río stated in an interview with Equalizer Soccer that she and multiple other players refused to continue in the national team if Quereda continued. In 2014, another former Spain international Mar Prieto claimed in an interview with Diario AS that both she and Laura del Río left for the same reason. Aside from his conflicts with individual players, Quereda also had controversial influence over Liga F (then called the Superliga or Primera División), the nation's highest women's league.

Spain placed bottom of their group at the 2015 FIFA Women's World Cup, the first time they qualified, despite the team having players with previous youth success. A statement issued by the entire World Cup squad called for a new era in RFEF women's football, specifically asking for Quereda to be replaced and for better tournament preparation, wanting an improved culture in the team. Later that month, Quereda was replaced with Jorge Vilda, who was once Spain's women's U-17s and U-19s coach as well the son of former Spain women's U-19 coach Ángel Vilda; multiple senior players were phased out of the squad in the following years, which they believe was in retaliation for speaking out.

== 2021: Breaking the Silence ==
In October 2021, the documentary Breaking the Silence was released (originally in Spanish as Romper el silencio on Movistar +), detailing Quereda's 27-year reign and featuring interviews with former players about "an alleged culture of rampant fear, bigotry, sexism and homophobia". In it, Quereda was accused further of widespread abuse and homophobia. The players detailed a culture of fear despite his initially outwardly friendly persona, and excessive controlling behaviour towards them, including not permitting them to close their hotel room doors until he had checked on everyone and then shut the doors for them. Vicky Losada, an openly LGBT player, and Verónica Boquete said that Quereda "wanted to eradicate" homosexuality, which he said was a sickness, and frequently expressed these views. Players explained they had expressed their concerns about Quereda to the RFEF on multiple occasions but that the then-president, Ángel María Villar, enabled Quereda. They believed that because of this, change was prevented from within, and the public statement from the whole team in 2015 only forced a change in coach due to enough public pressure.

Around the same time as the documentary, the 2021 NWSL abuse scandal came to light, with Boquete confirming that Quereda's abuse had been going on for years by the time she was playing at implicated NWSL clubs in the early 2010s.

== Las 15: 2022–23 player dispute ==
Las 15 (Note: One of the captains, Irene Paredes, did not send the letter after feeling singled-out following the prior press conference. Alexia Putellas did not send it due to being out with injury. Both have publicly supported the fifteen.)
Player	Club
Laia Aleixandri	(England) Manchester City
Ona Batlle	(England) Manchester United / Barcelona
Aitana Bonmatí	Barcelona
Mariona Caldentey	Barcelona
Nerea Eizagirre	Real Sociedad
Lola Gallardo	Atlético Madrid
Lucía García	(England) Manchester United
Patricia Guijarro	Barcelona
Mapi León	Barcelona
Ainhoa Moraza	Atlético Madrid
Leila Ouahabi	(England) Manchester City
Sandra Paños	Barcelona
Andrea Pereira	(Mexico) Club América
Clàudia Pina	Barcelona
Amaiur Sarriegi	Real Sociedad

=== Dispute ===
In the summer of 2022, senior players in the squad felt that it needed "a fresh start", particularly after going out at the quarter-finals at UEFA Women's Euro 2022 in July. There was discontent among players in the months before, and in the documentary Alexia: Labor Omnia Vincit, star player Alexia Putellas is shown expressing futility towards the team's situation in April 2022. With players having previously experienced malaise at the team's conditions, being one of the favourites at the Euro made it more disappointing when they did not perform. In August 2022, at the first Spain team camp after the Euro, three team captains (Irene Paredes, Jennifer Hermoso – who were both in the 2015 squad – and Patricia Guijarro, in place of the injured 2015 squad veteran Putellas) spoke to manager Jorge Vilda on behalf of the team, saying players "believed a change was needed in both training and tactics" and also had complaints about Vilda being too authoritarian. Some players felt that the national team training was not up to the standards of their high-level club team training. The captains also communicated their concerns to Luis Rubiales, the president of the RFEF. With the sense of the dispute entering the press, at the start of September, Paredes and Guijarro spoke at a team press conference to say that they believed in the team and had spoken to Vilda to "convey a message of general unease".

Later in September, fifteen national team players (who would quickly come to be identified as "Las 15") each sent the same letter by email to the RFEF, expressing concerns with the conditions and asking to not be called up. Parts of the email were subsequently leaked to the Spanish press, with some outlets also reporting that the players were demanding the resignation of Vilda; the captains disputed this, saying that the leaks were inaccurate and the email had only expressed how the players felt the team could be improved to deliver better results, asserting that they felt the need to take collective action in order to be listened to. Following the leak, all fifteen players, as well as Putellas (who had already not been in the squad since July with injury), tweeted a statement reiterating that they did not want to be called up. The RFEF responded to this by saying they backed Vilda and that the players would have to apologise and rescind their complaints to be allowed back into the squad. Several of the fifteen play in England, with British outlet The Guardian reporting in the hours after the leak that the RFEF's response, using "belligerent tone and language", indicated that any resolution would be difficult. It was later revealed that the RFEF had leaked the information.

Vilda did not call up any of the fifteen players, or those who publicly supported them, for October 2022 friendlies. When discussing the Spain women's team that played in these international friendlies, media referred to them with the shorthand name "Spain B", describing it as Spain's B team. This team still performed well, including managing to defeat the top-ranked, if injury-stricken, United States team (USWNT). International media attention generally focused on how the RFEF defined the situation, though Lucy Bronze – a FIFPRO Global Player Council representative who played for Barcelona at the time – wrote in English media in October 2022 that the Spanish players were seeking to improve their conditions and should be supported, comparing it to the overhaul of England since 2017 or the USWNT's fight for equality throughout the 21st century.

Vilda told the media that what he was going through was something he would not wish on anyone, and that what the players were doing to him was unfair. In the following months, Vilda did not discuss the players or their absence. With the RFEF refusing to acknowledge the players or consider their requests, the "flame of 'las 15'" went out, with Relevo saying that the major effect of this was turning them from a unified group into fifteen individuals with similar principles.

Paredes returned to the squad in March 2023. Ahead of the 2023 FIFA Women's World Cup, Spanish media reported that "most" of the fifteen had spoken to the RFEF about returning to the squad; in the days after, some players denied this, and it was later revealed that at least seven had not. Three of the fifteen were announced in the preliminary squad for the World Cup in June 2023 – having spoken to the RFEF beforehand but not apologising – as was Putellas after recovering from injury. Putellas had also acted as mediator, reaching out to the national team and the fifteen players individually to try and see the conflict resolved. Other influences on players deciding to return to the team were pushes from agents and personal sponsors, with Aitana Bonmatí also saying that the RFEF internally appeared to be in the process of making positive changes and that she considered this enough. The media was surprised when record goalkeeper Sandra Paños, who reportedly did speak to the RFEF, was not included in the World Cup squad, while her uncapped Barcelona substitute Cata Coll was; it was said that Paños had been omitted as Vilda had settled on Misa Rodríguez as starting goalkeeper in the interim and did not want to introduce tension over competing for the role.

=== Impact on domestic football ===
The Women's Clásico rivalry between Real Madrid and Barcelona had previously not been a serious affair. The rupture in the national team, which saw many Barcelona players denounce the squad while none from Real Madrid did (reported by some to be due to the Real Madrid administration pressuring them not to be involved), created a growing dispute between the clubs, "a new and emerging Barça-Madrid divide" for the women's teams. At the first Women's Clásico after the dispute began, Barcelona's Aitana Bonmatí refused to shake hands with Real Madrid's Misa Rodríguez in a "shocking" moment.

The 2022–23 Supercopa de España Femenina in January 2023 was contested by Barcelona and Real Sociedad, teams whose players comprised more than half of the fifteen. When no RFEF representatives would go to the pitch to award Barcelona their winners' medals and Real Sociedad their runners-up medals, Spanish media reported that sources said the RFEF had not wanted to be seen with the players in the fifteen. The RFEF disputed this, and Barcelona management said that it seemed unlikely as there had not been a tense atmosphere at the match. Afterwards, Bronze shared on Instagram a photograph of her at their winners' ceremony, which prominently showed the back of her shirt and her squad number, 15; she captioned the photograph "Las 15", considered a double entendre expressing her support for the fifteen players. Bronze, a prominent global player and advocate, had previously expressed support for them on other occasions.

== 2023 Women's World Cup: Rubiales sexual harassment ==
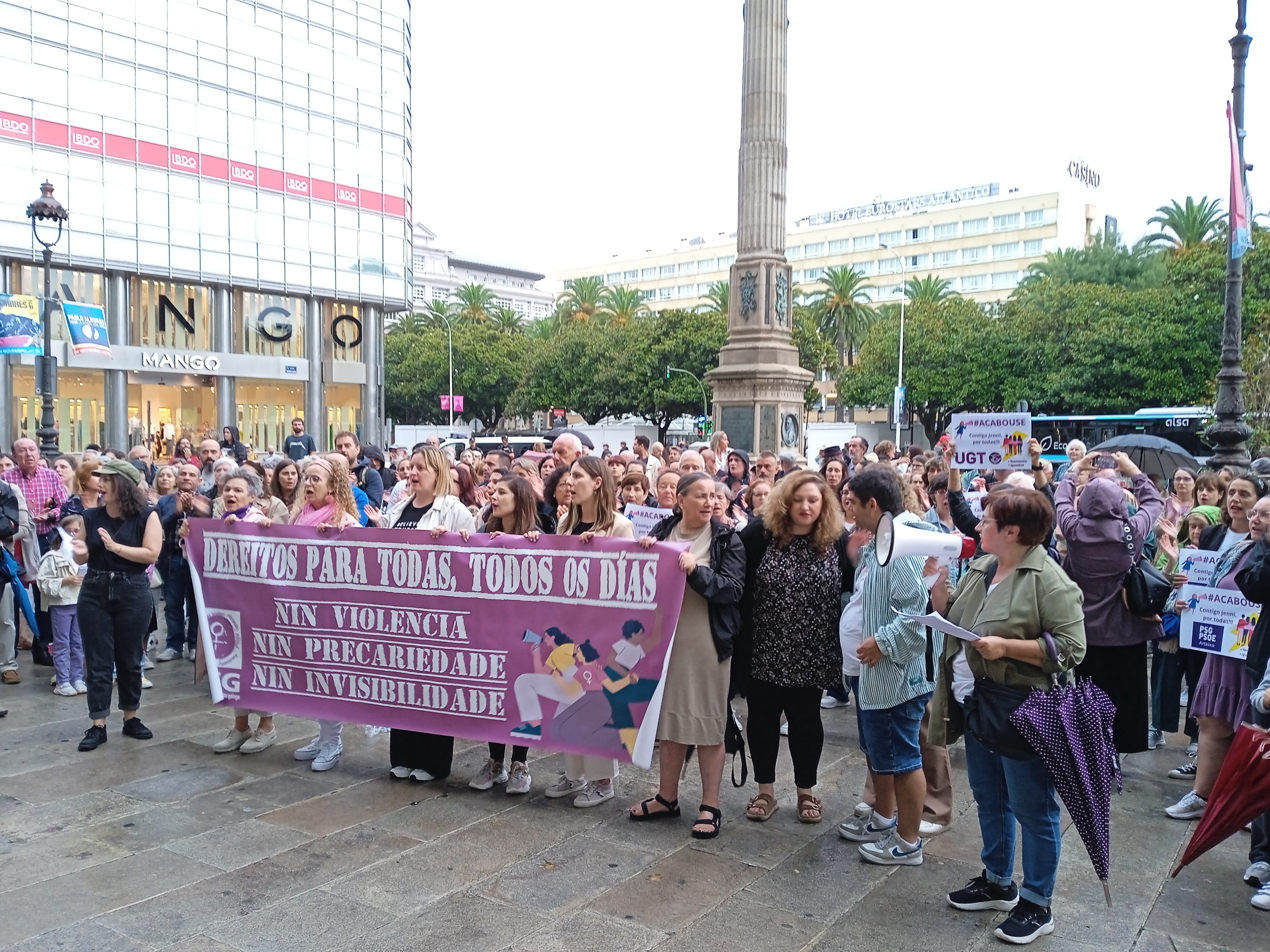
"#Acabouse" protest in A Coruña, 28 August 2023

During the medal ceremony after Spain won the World Cup, Royal Spanish Football Federation (RFEF) president Luis Rubiales kissed Jennifer Hermoso on the lips, despite her visible displeasure. The action drew criticism, particularly towards the continued sexism in the sport, and calls for Rubiales's resignation. In a separate incident at the end of the match, Rubiales was filmed pointing to the Spain players before grabbing his crotch, with the obscene gesture further criticised as he was standing next to the teenage Infanta Sofía.

After Hermoso had said she did not expect or like the kiss, Rubiales entered the players' dressing room, reportedly throwing his arm around Hermoso and joking about marrying her in Ibiza. While on a layover returning from Australia, Rubiales published an apology video in which he said that he had no bad intentions and was sorry for distracting from the celebration, saying: "I have to apologise, learn from this, and understand that when you are president you have to be more careful."

Rubiales faced heavy criticism for his actions, and calls for him to resign from various Spanish footballing bodies as well as the government. In cooperation with Vilda he tried to get Hermoso to publicly support him, issuing a fake statement on her behalf when she would not. Hermoso subsequently issued a statement through her union, Futpro, with the union saying the kiss was unacceptable and that they were working on seeing it punished.

The RFEF called an extraordinary general meeting for 25 August. Although Rubiales leaked to his close circle and the press that he would be resigning during the meeting, he instead recanted his words and vehemently refused to stand down. Among the responses, largely negative towards Rubiales and the RFEF, the Spanish government filed a complaint in the Sports Administrative Court and 81 current and former players, including all 23 from the Women's World Cup-winning squad, released a joint statement to boycott the national team until the RFEF changes leadership. Hermoso followed this up with a full statement accounting her experience of the incidents, as well as mentioning previous and ongoing abuses in the environment of the national squad.

On 26 August, FIFA suspended Rubiales until 24 November.

81 signatories

- Jennifer Hermoso
- Alèxia Putellas
- Misa Rodríguez
- Irene Paredes
- Ona Batlle
- Mariona Caldentey
- Teresa Abelleira
- María Pérez
- Cata Coll
- Aitana Bonmatí
- Laia Codina
- Claudia Zornoza
- Oihane Hernández
- Rocío Gálvez
- Irene Guerrero
- Alba Redondo
- Athenea del Castillo
- Eva Navarro
- Enith Salón
- Ivana Andrés
- Olga Carmona
- Esther González
- Salma Paralluelo
- Elene Lete
- Fiamma Benítez
- Marta Cardona
- Maite Oroz
- Patricia Guijarro
- Lola Gallardo
- Nerea Eizagirre
- Ainhoa Moraza
- Maria León "Mapi"
- Sandra Paños
- Claudia Pina
- Amaiur Sarriegi
- Leila Ouahabi
- Laia Aleixandri
- Lucia García
- Andrea Pereira
- Vero Boquete
- Ainhoa Tirapu
- Sandra Vilanova
- Ana Romero "Willy"
- Silvia Meseguer
- Nagore Calderón
- Marta Torrejón
- Lucía Rodríguez
- Vicky Losada
- Carmen Arce "Kubalita"
- Priscila Borja
- Natalia Pablos
- Susana Guerrero
- Larraitz Lucas
- Isabel Benito "Chabe"
- Amanda Sampedro
- Isabel Fuentes
- Elisabet Sánchez
- Mari Paz Azagra
- Vanesa Gimbert
- Virginia Torrecilla
- Leire Landa
- Elisabet Ibarra
- Isi Gavilán "Isi"
- Toña Is
- Meli Nicolau
- Gurutze Fernandez
- Auxi Jiménez
- Vanesa Moreno "Vane"
- Roser Serra
- María Goñi
- Marta Moreno
- Eli Capa
- Maria Teresa Andreu
- Mar Prieto
- María José Perez
- María Marco "Beni"
- Paula Kasares
- María Luisa Monzón "Gusa"
- Nines Pérez Urda "Quilla"
- Angela Martín Martín
- Victoria Hernandez
