= Andrea Pereira =

Spanish footballer (born 1993)

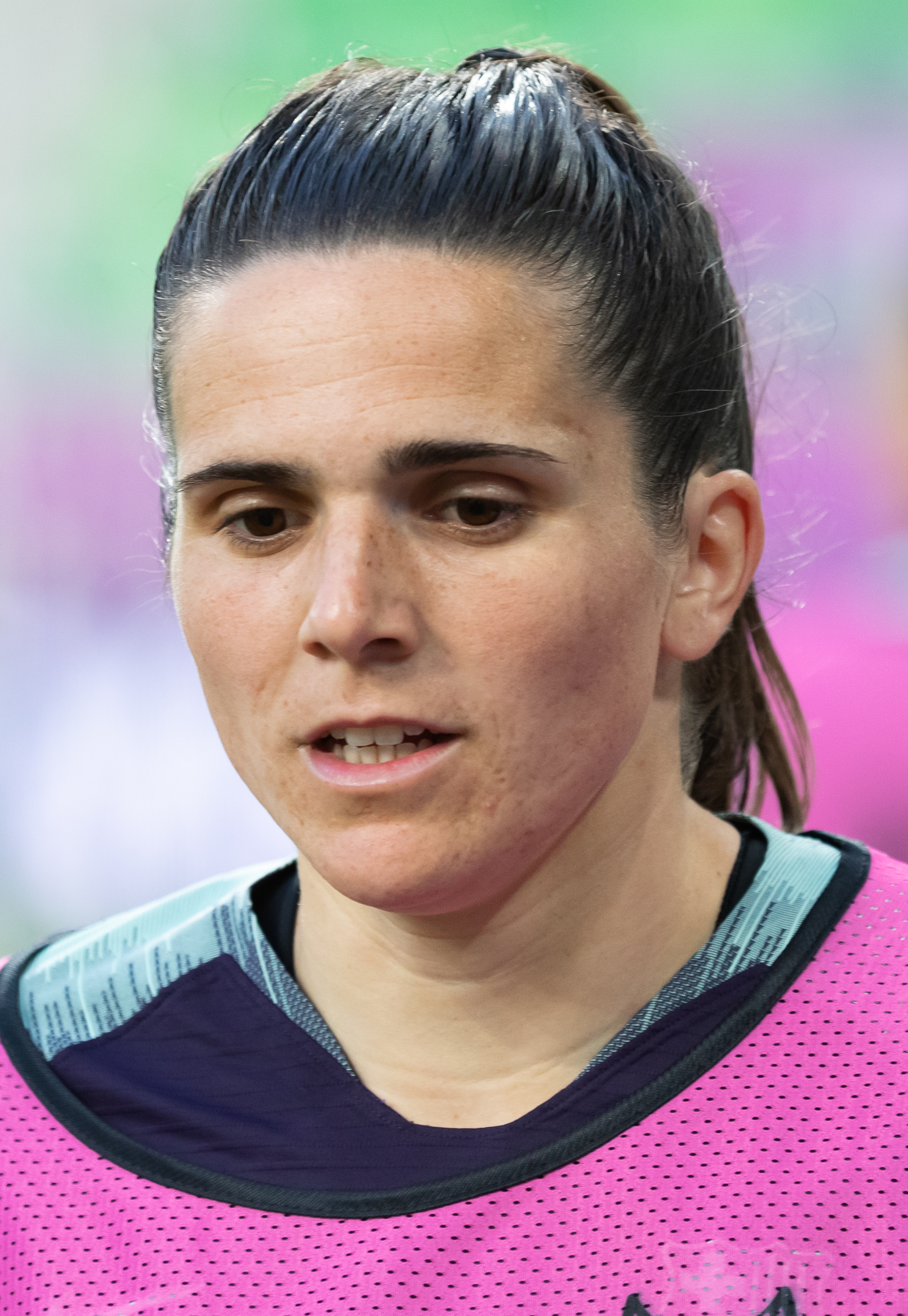
- Pereira with Barcelona in 2019

Personal information
- Full name: Andrea Pereira Cejudo
- Date of birth: 19 September 1993 (age 33)
- Place of birth: Barcelona, Spain
- Height: 1.66 m (5 ft 5 in)
- Position: Centre-back

Team information
- Current team: UNAM
- Number: 8

Youth career
- Espanyol

Senior career*
Years	Team	Apps	(Gls)
2009–2011	Espanyol B		
2011–2016	Espanyol		
2016–2018	Atlético Madrid	50	(0)
2018–2022	Barcelona	86	(0)
2022–2024	América	77	(22)
2024–2026	Pachuca	57	(4)
2026–	UNAM	0	(0)

International career^{‡}
2010–2012	Spain U19	17	(0)
2016–2022	Spain	42	(0)
2014–2017	Catalonia	3	(0)
- * Club domestic league appearances and goals ‡ National team caps and goals as of 23:25, 31 July 2022 (UTC)

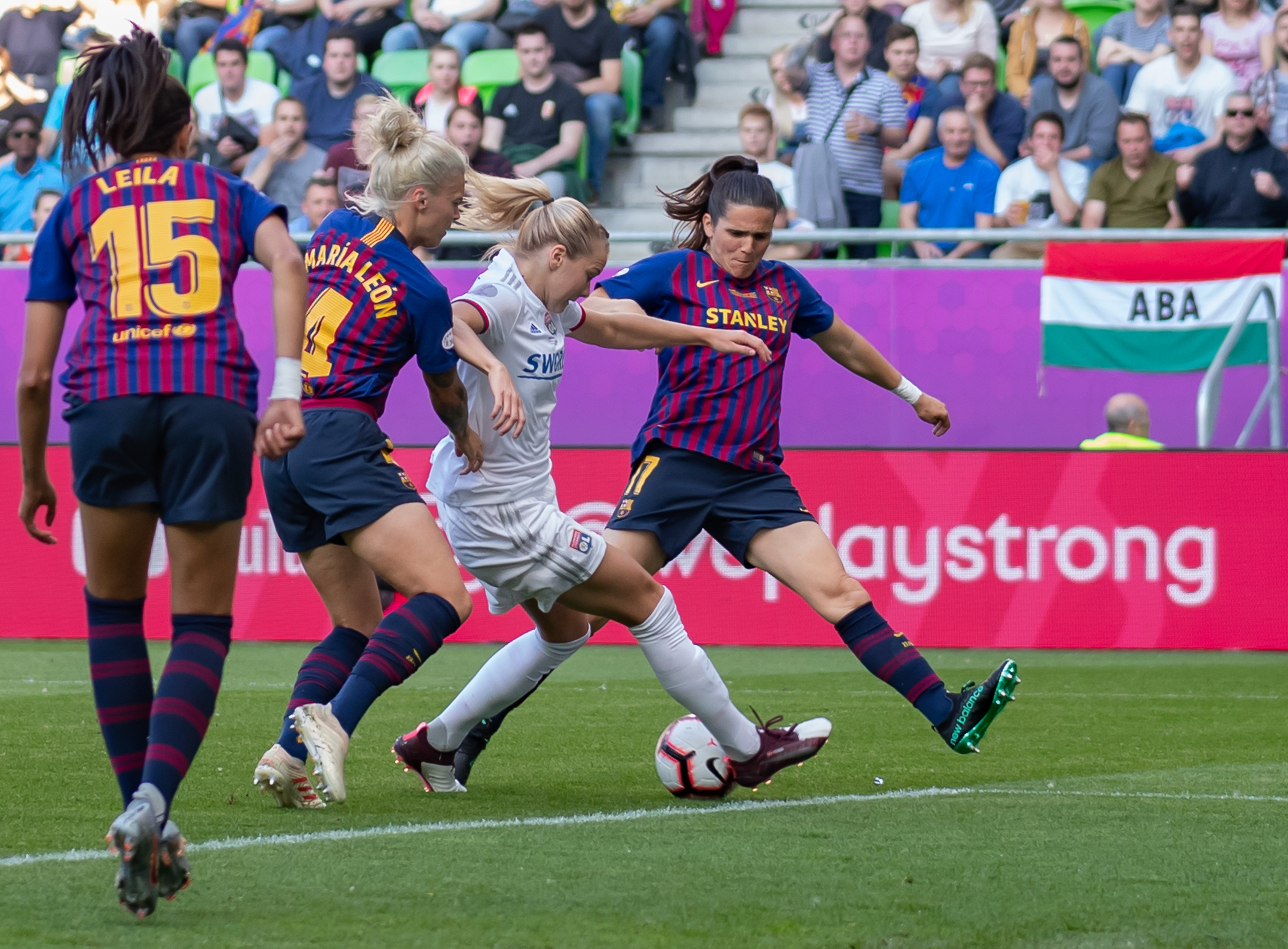
Pereira (on the right) in a match against Olympique Lyonnais

Andrea Pereira Cejudo (born 19 September 1993) is a Spanish professional footballer who plays as a defender for Liga MX Femenil side UNAM and the Spain women's national team.

== Club career ==
Born in Barcelona, Pereira made her senior debut with the reserves of RCD Espanyol in 2009. Two years later, she played her first game in Primera División with the first team.

Pereira continued playing for Espanyol during five seasons, until 2016, when she signs a new contract with Atlético de Madrid.

== International career ==
Pereira made her senior international debut in March 2016, starting a 0–0 friendly draw with Romania in Mogoșoaia.

She was one of Las 15, a group of players who made themselves unavailable for international selection in September 2022 due to their dissatisfaction with head coach Jorge Vilda, and among the dozen who were not involved 11 months later as Spain won the World Cup.

== Honours ==
Espanyol

- Copa de la Reina de Fútbol: 2012
- Copa Catalunya: 2013

Atlético Madrid

- Primera División: 2016–17, 2017–18

Barcelona

- Primera División: 2019–20, 2020–21, 2021–22
- UEFA Women's Champions League: 2020–21;
- Supercopa Femenina: 2019–20, 2021–22
- Copa de la Reina: 2019–20, 2020–21

Club América

- Liga MX Femenil: Clausura 2023

Spain

- Algarve Cup: 2017
