= Operation Brody =

Spanish corruption investigation

Operation Brody is an ongoing investigation in Spain conducted by the Central Operative Unit of the Civil Guard. It became public in March 2024 and is investigating alleged corruption within the Royal Spanish Football Federation during the presidency of former president Luis Rubiales; raids were carried out and multiple people arrested.

Rubiales was in the Dominican Republic, despite also being tried in court in Spain for alleged sexual misconduct and coercion at the time, but was arrested in Spain upon his return on 3 April 2024.

== Allegations and investigation ==
The Royal Spanish Football Federation (RFEF) and its long-serving former president Luis Rubiales, who had been banned from all football-related activities by FIFA in 2023 due to the Rubiales affair, have faced accusations of institutional corruption in various complaints and investigations.

The immediate instigation of Operation Brody was a case brought in 2022 by Miguel Galán, the leader of national coaches training body Cenafe, on behalf of the Transparency and Democracy in Sports Association. The 2022 case sued Rubiales and then-footballer Gerard Piqué, who also owns sports investment company Kosmos, alleging corruption in the agreement to move the Supercopa de España to Saudi Arabia and other arrangements of the Supercopa.

Operation Brody also serves the investigation of events held in China and projects in Seville. It was announced in mid-March 2024 that investigators were searching through up to five million emails over six years of records. Also under investigation is former footballer Nene, a close friend of Rubiales who was also with him in the Dominican Republic. Investigators allege that Rubiales awarded RFEF contracts to companies linked to Nene and received a commission, and that they guaranteed a construction company an RFEF contract worth almost €4 million, in exchange for allegedly receiving part of the invoiced payments.

The operation began in or before January 2024, when the Civil Guard was approved to tap the phone of RFEF legal advisor and Rubiales' "right hand man" Tomás González Cueto. The phones of Rubiales, Nene, and Ángel González Segura (the construction company director and brother of an RFEF lawyer) were also tapped.

== Raids ==
The raids, primarily undertaken by the Central Operative Unit and ordered by Majadahonda district judge Delia Rodrigo, were launched at 09:00 on 20 March 2024, when the RFEF board was holding elections following a series of resignations and removals in 2023; most of the persons of interest were together in the RFEF headquarters at Las Rozas de Madrid. The Spain men's national football team was also training at the base at the time, while the Civil Guard conducted searches at the facility, and staff were prevented from entering the building while searches took place.

Though Rubiales had already left the country, his house in Granada was searched, as one of eleven properties raided over 20 hours on that and the following day — the raids ended at about 03:00 on 21 March 2024. Rubiales' house in the Dominican Republic was later also searched.

== Arrests ==
Seven people were arrested during the raids, including González Cueto and RFEF legal director Pedro González Segura. The two testified on 22 March 2024 and were released without charge. In addition to the seven arrests, the Civil Guard named five more persons of interest, including Rubiales; by 7 April 2024, there had been nine arrests (including Rubiales) and six other persons being investigated.

Kosmos confirmed that none of their staff were arrested or wanted, and that none of their properties had been involved in the raids.

According to Marca, Rubiales’ visit to the Dominican Republic was part of a long-term plan and not solely precipitated by his removal and the investigation,with Marca reporting that he might remain there while under investigation in Spain. He returned to Spain on 3 April and was arrested upon landing at Madrid–Barajas Airport. In a public interview about the Supercopa allegations, Rubiales denied all wrongdoing, saying: "The money in my bank account is the result of my work and my savings."
