= Maria Teresa Andreu =

Spanish footballer and sports executive (born 1952)

- Born: Maria Teresa Andreu Grau; 21 January 1952 (age 74); Barcelona, Catalonia, Spain
- Other name: "Marisa"
- Occupation: Women's football executive
Association football career
- Position: Goalkeeper
Senior career*
Years	Team	Apps	(Gls)
1971–1982	Barcelona	1+	
- * Club domestic league appearances and goals

President of women's football for the Royal Spanish Football Federation
- In office 1980–1998
- Preceded by: office created

President of women's football for the Catalan Football Federation
- In office 1980–2005

Maria Teresa Andreu Grau (21 January 1952), also written as Mª Teresa Andreu, is a Spanish former football goalkeeper and leading women's football executive considered a main pioneer of women's football in Spain and Catalonia.

She served as the president of women's football within the Royal Spanish Football Federation (RFEF) for eighteen years, becoming the inaugural president upon the RFEF recognising women's football in 1980, despite still actively playing for Barcelona at the time. She resigned in protest in 1998 after the players of the women's national team highlighted concerns with their coach but the RFEF president refused to let Andreu fire him.

== Football career ==
Andreu joined Barcelona in May 1971, when the 1971–72 season's league began, as a reserve goalkeeper. For her team name she was known as Maria Teresa and Marisa. She made a substitute appearance in the team's 5–0 victory over Gramanet on 21 May 1971, but otherwise did not play in the league and was not mentioned among Barcelona's "unbeaten" goalkeepers later in the season.

By March 1974, at which point Núria Llansà had moved to Espanyol, Andreu was Barcelona's first-choice goalkeeper.

She stopped playing for the team in 1982.

== Executive career ==
According to RTVE, all of Andreu's executive positions were unpaid.

=== FC Barcelona ===
By 1977, Andreu was the president of the Barcelona women's team, and spoke well of the working relationship with the staff of FC Barcelona. During the 1982–83 season, Andreu suggested that the team be called Club Femenino/Femení (CF) Barcelona, to be closer to the name of the men's team, with this change made official before the 1983 Copa de la Reina de Fútbol.

In 2000, she was elected to the board of directors of FC Barcelona. Within the year she had brought Club Femení Barcelona into the Barcelona Foundation's organisational structure, making the women's team part of the club in administration. Andreu then convinced the club to fully integrate the women's team as an official section of the club in 2002.

Andreu's directorship coincided with the presidency of Joan Gaspart, a bad presidency, with Andreu later reflecting that she often had to step up. She was on the board until 2003, before the start of Joan Laporta's first club presidency. She was later one of the directors in the campaign running against Laporta as he sought his second presidency; Laporta won the election. She was again on the slate running against Laporta in the 2026 FC Barcelona presidential election as he was seeking his third presidency; as an active spokesperson for Víctor Font's candidacy, Andreu said the Font plans for FC Barcelona would see more women's sections and more financial independence for Barça Femení.

=== Spanish Football Federation ===
Upon the Royal Spanish Football Federation (RFEF) formally recognising women's football in 1980, Andreu was appointed the president of women's football in both the Catalan Football Federation (FCF) and the RFEF. Speaking in 2023, following multiple controversies surrounding how the RFEF treated the Spain women's national football team, Andreu identified a culture shift that began when Ángel María Villar became RFEF president in 1988.

In 1988, Andreu appointed Ignacio Quereda to be manager of the Spain women's team, with Quereda being the friend and preferred choice of Villar. From the beginning, Andreu noticed that Quereda took more control over organisational matters. After Quereda had been in post for almost a decade with little development, and spurred by poor results in 1997 UEFA Women's Euro qualifying, the players of the Spanish team wrote a letter to Quereda requesting his resignation. Quereda took the letter to Andreu and Villar, the latter of whom was loyal to Quereda. Andreu repeatedly tried to convince Villar to fire Quereda, which he refused to do; Andreu submitted her resignation in 1998 due to the lack of action.

=== Others ===
In 1990, she became a member of UEFA's Women's Football Committee, a position she held until 2004.

She has also been part of the Catalan Women's Olympic Committee and the Women and Sport Commission of the Sports Federation Union of Catalonia (UFEC).
