= Lola Gallardo =

Spanish footballer (born 1993)

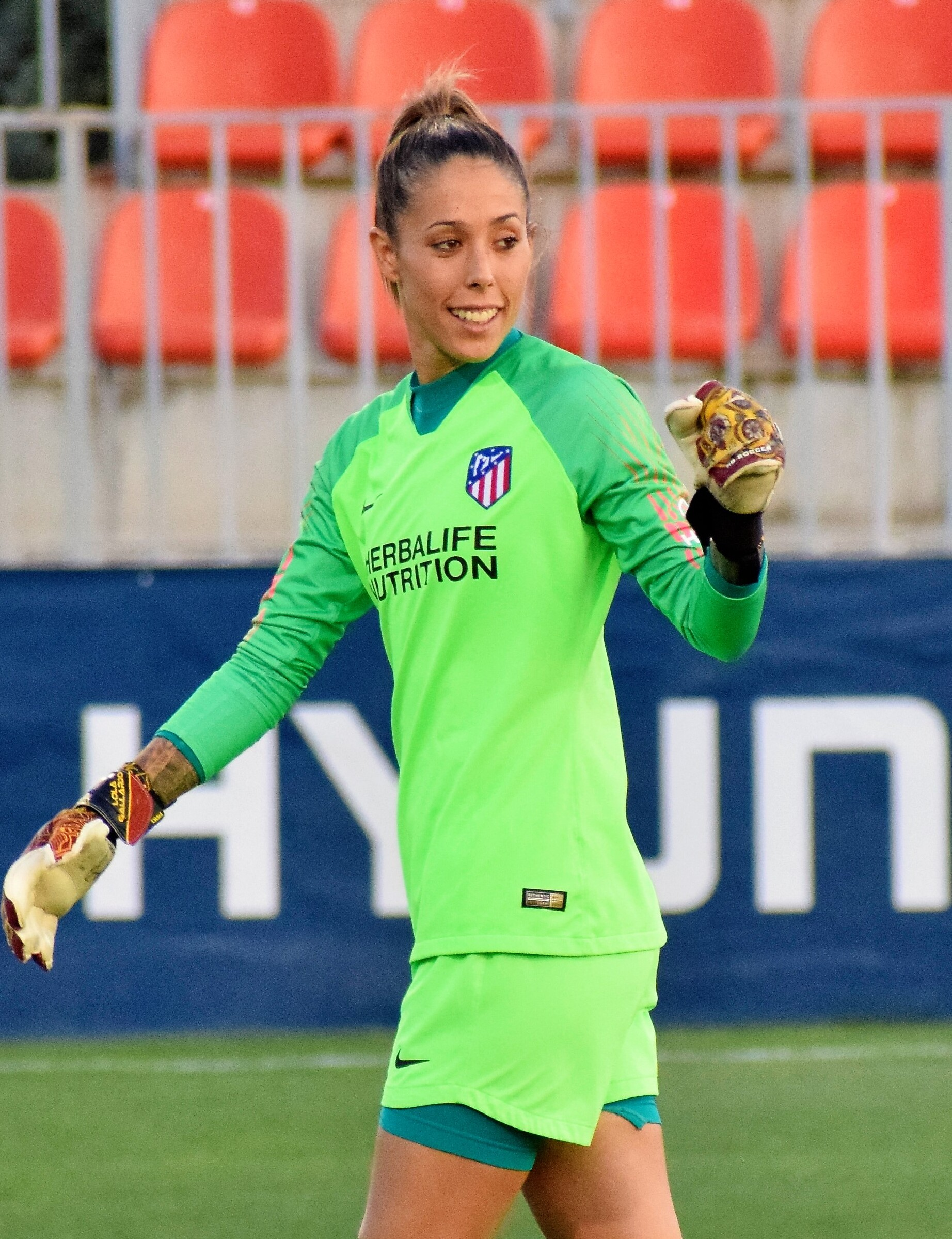
- Gallardo with Atlético Madrid in 2018

Personal information
- Full name: María Dolores Gallardo Núñez
- Date of birth: 10 June 1993 (age 33)
- Place of birth: Seville, Spain
- Height: 1.74 m (5 ft 9 in)
- Position: Goalkeeper

Team information
- Current team: Atlético Madrid
- Number: 1

Senior career*
Years	Team	Apps	(Gls)
2008–2011	Sevilla		
2011–2012	Sporting Huelva	32	(0)
2012–2020	Atlético Madrid	191	(0)
2020–2021	Lyon	3	(0)
2021–	Atlético Madrid	105	(0)

International career^{‡}
2013–2022	Spain	38	(0)
- * Club domestic league appearances and goals as of 13 November 2020 ‡ National team caps and goals as of 15:24, 30 May 2025 (UTC)

María Dolores "Lola" Gallardo Núñez (born 10 June 1993) is a Spanish professional footballer who plays as a goalkeeper for Primera División club Atlético Madrid and the Spain women's national team.

== Club career ==
Lola started her career at Sevilla FC before moving to Sporting Huelva. and arriving at Atlético Madrid in 2012.

On 1 July 2020, Gallardo was announced at Lyon on a two year contract.

== International career ==
In 2010, she was named the best player in the U-17 European Championship and the best goalkeeper in the U-17 World Cup.

In June 2013 national team coach Ignacio Quereda selected Gallardo in the senior Spain squad for UEFA Women's Euro 2013 in Sweden, one of two reserves for established first choice goalkeeper Ainhoa Tirapu. Gallardo had won her first senior international cap in a 2–2 pre-tournament friendly draw with Denmark in Vejle.

She was part of Spain's squad at the 2015 FIFA Women's World Cup.

On 20 May 2019, Gallardo was called up to the Spain squad for the 2019 FIFA Women's World Cup.

Gallardo was part of the Spain squad called up for the UEFA Women's Euro 2022.

She was one of Las 15, a group of players who made themselves unavailable for international selection in September 2022 due to their dissatisfaction with head coach Jorge Vilda, and among the dozen who were not involved 11 months later as Spain won the World Cup.

== Personal life ==
Gallardo married her now wife Cristina Vicente on the 12th of June 2025. They had gotten engaged on the 9th of December 2023.

On 25 September 2026, she announced a partnership with the OnlyFans platform with the stated goal of "bringing people closer to women's football".

== Honours ==
Atlético Madrid

- Primera División: 2016–17, 2017–18, 2018–19
- Copa de la Reina de Fútbol: 2016

Olympique Lyon

- UEFA Women's Champions League: 2019–20

Spain

- UEFA Women's Under-17 Championship (1): 2010

Individual

- UEFA Women's Under-17 Championship Golden Player Award: 2010
