= Ainhoa Vicente =

Spanish footballer (born 1995)

Ainhoa
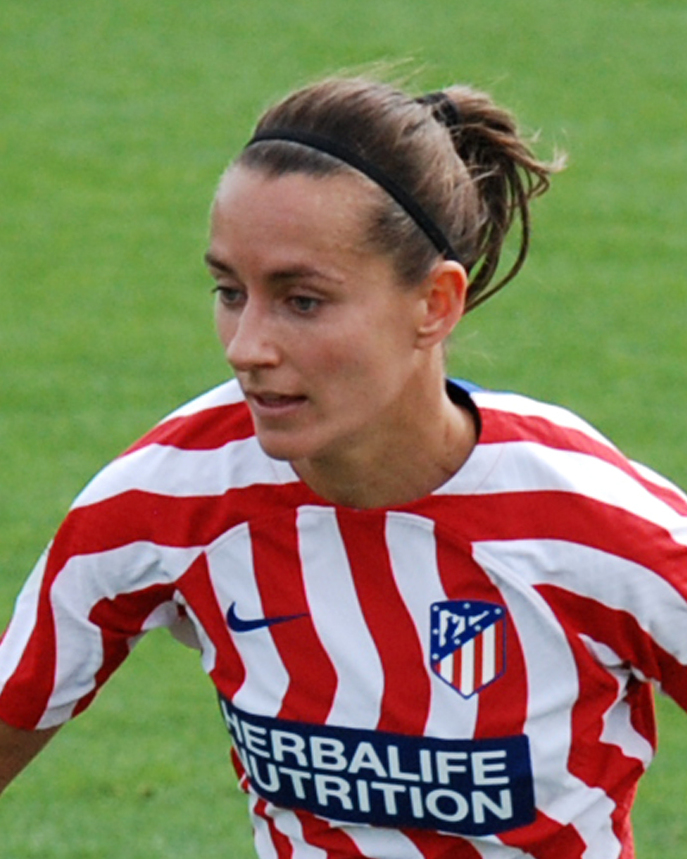
- Vicente with Atlético Madrid in 2022

Personal information
- Full name: Ainhoa Vicente Moraza
- Date of birth: 20 August 1995 (age 31)
- Place of birth: San Sebastián, Spain
- Height: 1.66 m (5 ft 5 in)
- Position: Wingback

Team information
- Current team: Real Sociedad
- Number: 3

Youth career
- Añorga

Senior career*
Years	Team	Apps	(Gls)
2011–2012	Añorga		
2012–2015	Real Sociedad	76	(4)
2015–2022	Athletic Bilbao	194	(8)
2022–2025	Atlético Madrid	81	(1)
2025–	Real Sociedad	15	(0)

International career
2014–	Basque Country	4	(0)
2020–2022	Spain	6	(0)
- * Club domestic league appearances and goals as of 05:13, 16 January 2026 (UTC)

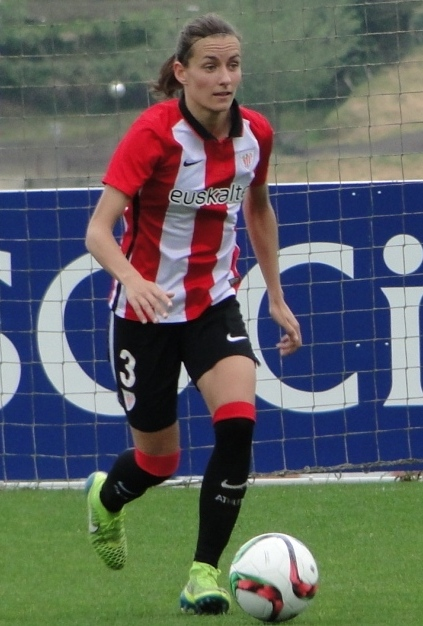
Vicente playing for Athletic Club in 2016

Ainhoa Vicente Moraza (born 20 August 1995), also known as Ainhoa Moraza, is a Spanish professional footballer who plays as a defender for Liga F club Real Sociedad and the Spain national team.

== Club career ==
Vicente began her career as a teenager at Añorga in Gipuzkoa, moving on to the province's main club Real Sociedad in 2012. After three years in San Sebastián she signed for Athletic Bilbao, winning the Primera División title in her first season and staying there for six more. In 2022, after appearing over 200 times for Athletic, she elected not to renew her contract (as did teammate and fellow Spanish international Lucía García) and joined Atlético Madrid.

== International career ==
She was one of Las 15, a group of players who made themselves unavailable for international selection in September 2022 due to their dissatisfaction with head coach Jorge Vilda, and among the dozen who were not involved 11 months later as Spain won the World Cup.

== Honours ==
Athletic Bilbao

- Primera División: 2015–16

Atlético Madrid

- Copa de la Reina de Fútbol: 2022–23
