= Lucía García =

Spanish footballer

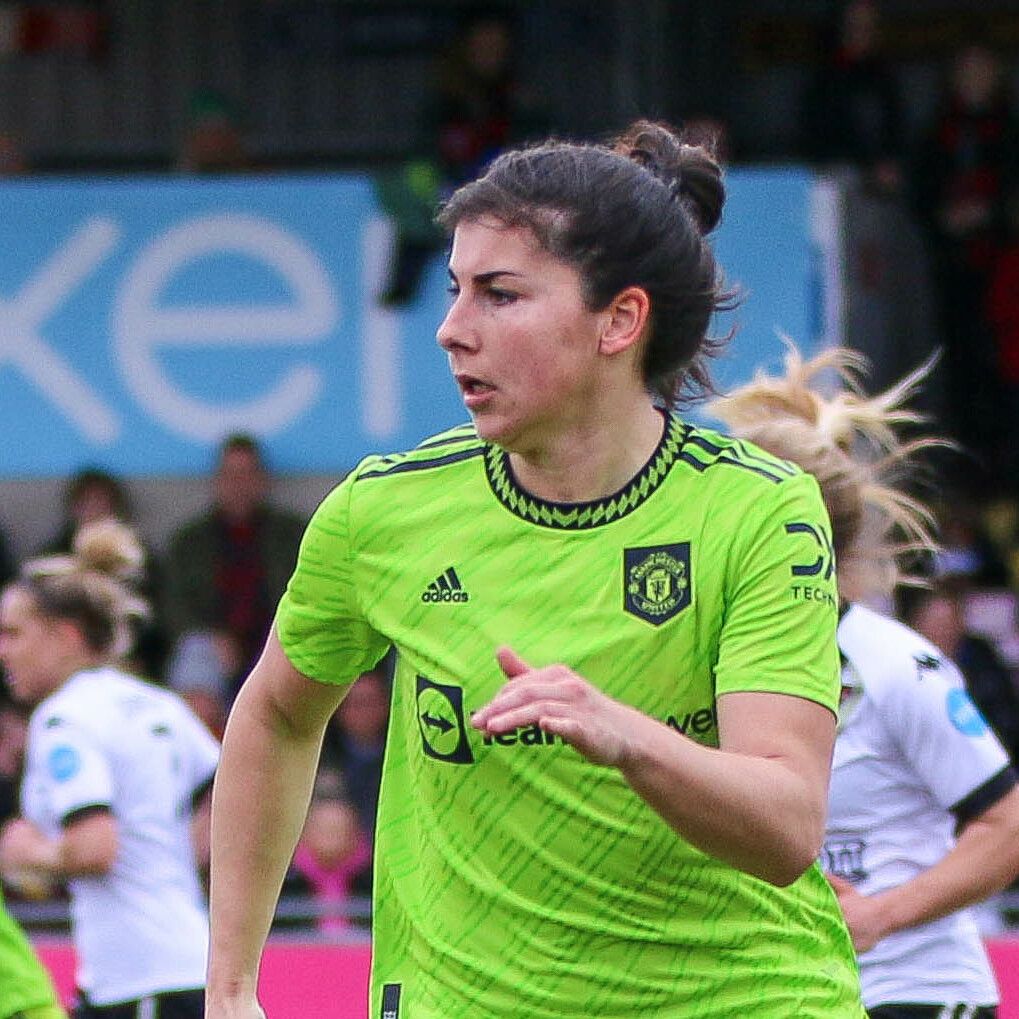
- García playing for Manchester United in 2023

Personal information
- Full name: Lucía García Córdoba
- Date of birth: 14 July 1998 (age 28)
- Place of birth: Barakaldo, Spain
- Height: 1.65 m (5 ft 5 in)
- Positions: Forward; winger

Team information
- Current team: Monterrey
- Number: 17

Senior career*
Years	Team	Apps	(Gls)
2013–2016	Oviedo Moderno	63	(19)
2016–2022	Athletic Bilbao	148	(59)
2022–2024	Manchester United	41	(11)
2024–	Monterrey	38	(21)

International career^{‡}
2015–2016	Spain U17	8	(6)
2016–2017	Spain U19	16	(17)
2016–2018	Spain U20	6	(4)
2018–	Spain	53	(11)
Medal record
Representing Spain
UEFA Women's Championship
Runner-up	2025 Switzerland
UEFA Women's Nations League
Winner	2024 France–Netherlands–Spain
FIFA U-20 World Cup
Runner-up	2018 France
UEFA Women's Under-19 Championship
Winner	2017 Northern Ireland
Runner-up	2016 Slovakia
UEFA Women's Under-17 Championship
Winner	2015 Iceland
- * Club domestic league appearances and goals as of 2 February 2026 ‡ National team caps and goals as of 29 October 2024

Lucía García Córdoba (Spanish pronunciation: [luˈθi.a ɣaɾˈθi.a]; (Note: In isolation, García is pronounced [ɡaɾˈθi.a].) born 14 July 1998) is a Spanish professional footballer who plays as a forward or winger for Liga MX Femenil side C.F. Monterrey and the Spain national team. Starting with Spain U17, she has represented Spain internationally since 2015.

== Early life ==
García was the only female in a set of quadruplets. She was born at Cruces University Hospital in Barakaldo, Basque Country, 180 miles from her hometown of Aller, Asturias, after her mother decided on a specialist hospital due to the increased risk of a multiple birth. They were born prematurely after seven months and initially placed into incubators. Growing up she has stated that none of her brothers were particularly interested in football, and she played on the street as the village of 200 inhabitants had no football field. She played one year of futsal in nearby Cabañaquinta before taking up athletics and tennis for two years. When she was 13 years old, a physical education teacher suggested García try out for the youth team at Oviedo Moderno.

== Club career ==
=== Oviedo Moderno ===
On 8 September 2013, García made her senior debut for newly-promoted first division team Oviedo Moderno at the age of 15. She appeared as a 67th-minute substitute for Irene del Río on the opening day of the 2013–14 Primera División as Oviedo lost 2–1 to Valencia. In her debut season she scored eight goals in 26 league appearances as Oviedo finished 13th of 16 teams. She scored another eight goals in 18 appearances the following season as the team finished 10th, their best finish since 2003. In her third season, García scored three times in 19 games as Oviedo finished 15th and were relegated.

=== Athletic Bilbao ===
Following Oviedo's relegation at the end of the 2015–16 season, García remained in the Primera División and signed for reigning champions Athletic Bilbao in June 2016 – under their self-imposed player restrictions, the circumstances of her birth made her eligible to play for the all-Basque club. She made her debut on 3 September 2016, starting in the opening game of the season and scored in the 2–0 win over Fundación Albacete. She made her Champions League debut during the season, starting in a 2–1 win over reigning Danish Women's League champions Fortuna Hjørring in the round of 32 first leg.

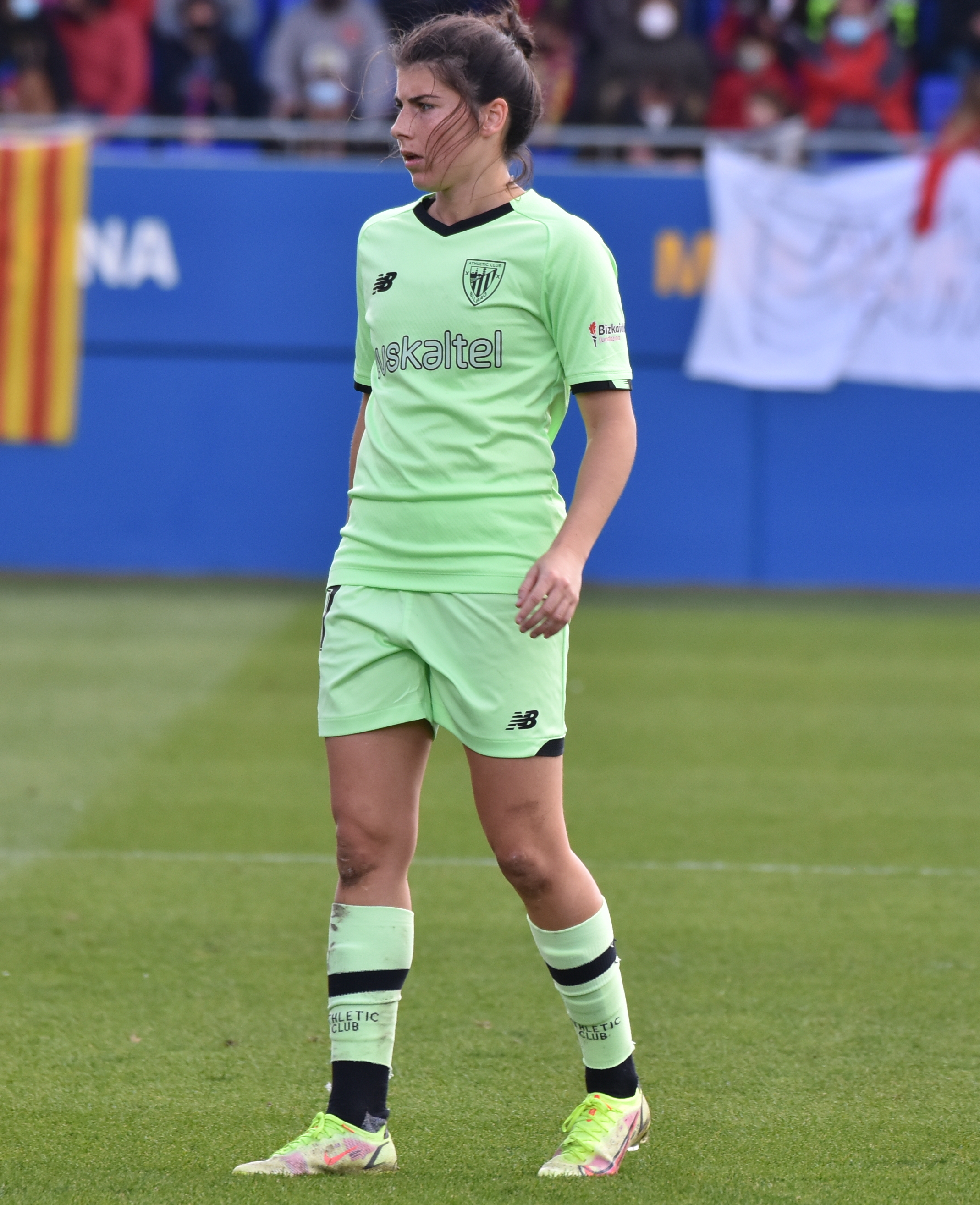
García playing for Athletic Bilbao (2021)

After scoring five and seven goals in her first two seasons respectively, García had a breakout season during 2018–19 season, scoring 13 goals in 22 matches, the most on the team and joint-8th best in the league. She scored her first career hat-trick on 13 March 2019 in a 4–3 league win over Logroño. Despite an injury impacted 2019–20 season, García made 18 league appearances, scoring nine goals. The following season she made 29 league appearances and scored a career-high 16 goals but, despite her own personal success, Athletic finished 11th in the 2020–21 Primera División, lower than the club's previous worst finishing position of 5th since joining the Primera División in 2002. In her final season, García scored a team-leading 12 league goals as the team improved to 7th. In six seasons, she scored 63 goals in 161 appearances in all competitions to help the club achieve a highest league finish of third in 2017–18, also reaching the Copa de la Reina semi-finals twice. In 2022, she elected not to renew her contract at Athletic (as did teammate and fellow Spanish international Ainhoa Moraza).

=== Manchester United ===
On 25 July 2022, García signed a two-year contract with English Women's Super League club Manchester United. She made her debut on 17 September 2022 in a 4–0 win against Reading before scoring her first goal for the club the following week in a 2–0 away win against West Ham United on 25 September. On 21 May 2023, García came off the bench to score the winning goal in the 90+1st minute of the Manchester derby, securing United's first ever league win over Manchester City.

In February 2024, during the 2023–24 season, García scored United's only goal in a 3–1 defeat to Arsenal in front of a record-breaking WSL crowd of 60,160 at a sold-out Emirates Stadium. In the 2024 Women's FA Cup final on 12 May 2024, García scored twice and was named player of the match, as Manchester United won the Women's FA Cup for the first time, beating Tottenham Hotspur 4–0 at Wembley Stadium. On 26 June 2024, it was announced that García would leave the club upon the expiry of her contract.

=== Monterrey ===
On 26 June 2024, it was announced that García had signed for Liga MX Femenil club Monterrey. She made her debut for the club during a 4–0 defeat to Tigres in the CONCACAF W Champions Cup on 22 August 2024. Four days later, on 26 August, she scored her first goal for the club during her league debut in a 5–0 victory against Deportivo Toluca.

== International career ==
=== Youth ===
As a youth, García represented Spain at under-17, under-19 and under-20 level including at four major youth tournaments: 2015 UEFA Women's Under-17 Championship, two editions of the UEFA Women's Under-19 Championship (2016 and 2017), and two FIFA U-20 Women's World Cup tournaments (2016 and 2018).

Spain won the 2015 UEFA Women's Under-17 Championship, beating Switzerland 5–2 in the final. García started all five games in the tournament and finished second in the golden boot race with five goals, one behind Stefanie Sanders of Germany.

The following year she represented Spain at the 2016 UEFA Women's Under-19 Championship in Slovakia as they finished as runners-up, losing to France 2–1 in the final. She scored four goals in five appearances, third behind golden boot winner Marie-Antoinette Katoto and runner-up Jill Roord. She was recalled to the squad later in the year for the 2016 FIFA U-20 Women's World Cup in Papua New Guinea, playing in all four games and scoring three goals: two in a group stage victory over Canada and another in a 3–2 defeat after extra-time to North Korea in the quarter-finals. She retained her place with the under-19s in 2017 and was selected by Pedro López to go the 2017 UEFA Women's Under-19 Championship. Spain won the tournament with a stoppage time goal from Patricia Guijarro against France. García started every game in the tournament and scored twice, second on the team behind Guijarro's five goals although she was not one of the seven Spanish players selected to the team of the tournament. The result also qualified Spain for the 2018 FIFA U-20 Women's World Cup. She made two appearances, both in the group stage, and scored once in a 2–2 draw with United States. Spain finished as runners-up, losing 3–1 to Japan in the final.

=== Senior ===
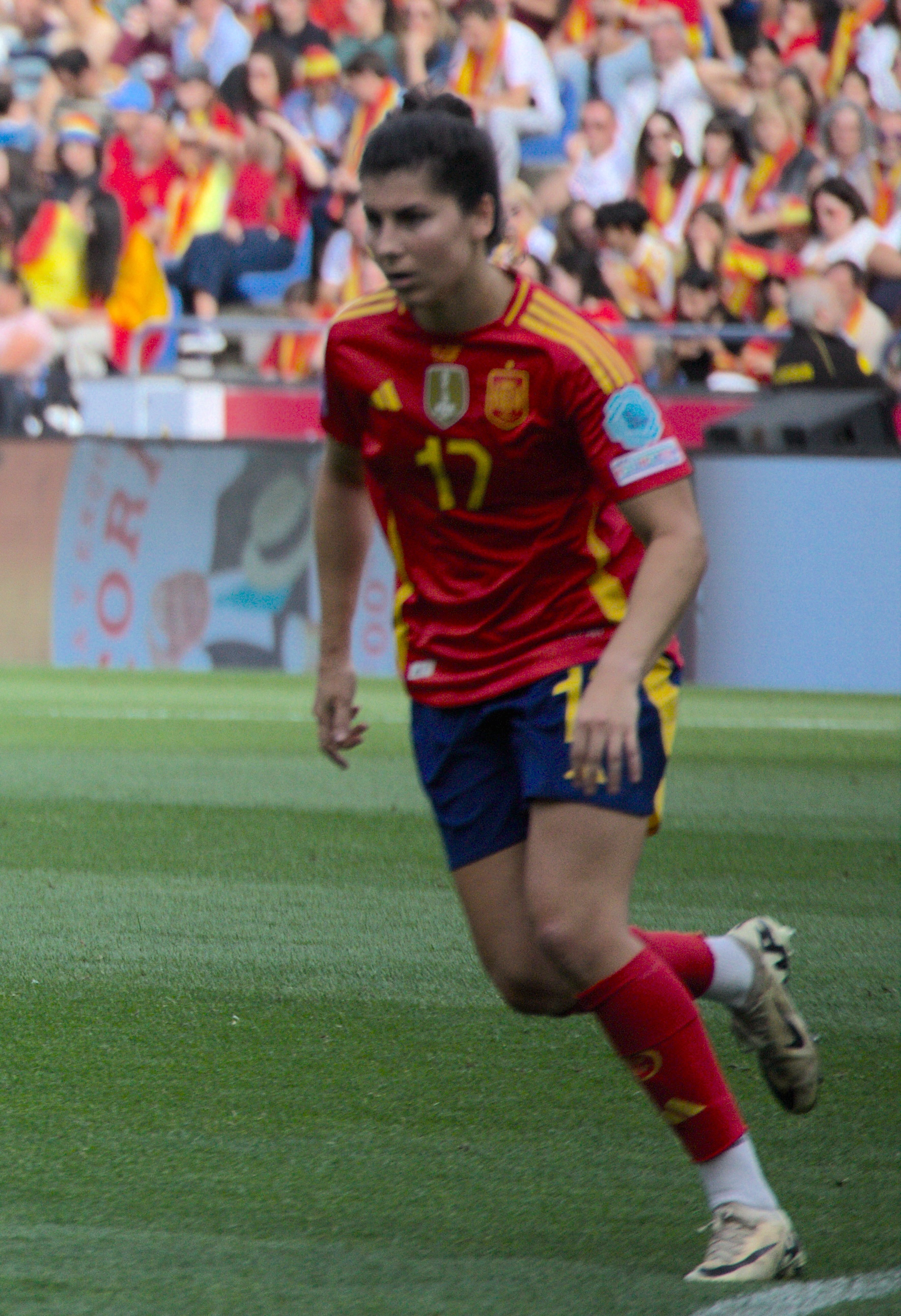
García with Spain in 2024

García earned her first senior international call-up for Spain for the 2018 Cyprus Women's Cup. She was given her debut during the tournament by Jorge Vilda on 2 March 2018, as a 58th-minute substitute for Jennifer Hermoso in a 0–0 draw with Belgium. She made a further two appearances against the Czech Republic and then in the final against Italy as Spain won the tournament.

In 2019, she was the youngest player named in the Spain squad for the 2019 FIFA Women's World Cup aged 20. García scored her first senior international goal on 8 June 2019, the third in Spain's 3–1 comeback win against South Africa in their opening group game to secure Spain's first ever win at a FIFA Women's World Cup.

In 2020, García scored four goals in four appearances for Spain. She scored a brace against Japan in a 3–1 victory at the 2020 SheBelieves Cup and another brace against Moldova during UEFA Women's Euro 2022 qualifying as Spain won 9–0.

In 2022, García was named to the squad for UEFA Women's Euro 2022, her second successive major tournament. With Jennifer Hermoso ruled out of the tournament through injury, García scored twice in a warm-up game against Australia before starting all three group games, scoring in a 4–1 win over Finland. She was an unused substitute for the quarter-final match against England as Spain lost 2–1 in extra-time.

She was one of Las 15, a group of players who made themselves unavailable for international selection in September 2022 due to their dissatisfaction with head coach Jorge Vilda, and among the dozen who were not involved 11 months later as Spain won the World Cup.

On 10 June 2025, García was called up to the Spain squad for the UEFA Women's Euro 2025.

== Career statistics ==
=== Club ===
As of match played 8 November 2024.

Appearances and goals by club, season and competition
Club	Season	League			National cup (Note: Includes the Copa de la Reina and Women's FA Cup)		League cup (Note: Includes the FA Women's League Cup)		Continental (Note: Includes the UEFA Women's Champions League and CONCACAF W Champions Cup)		Total	
Club	Season	Division	Apps	Goals	Apps	Goals	Apps	Goals	Apps	Goals	Apps	Goals
Oviedo Moderno	2013–14	Primera División	26	8	—		—		—		26	8
Oviedo Moderno	2014–15	Primera División	18	8	—		—		—		18	8
Oviedo Moderno	2015–16	Primera División	19	3	—		—		—		19	3
Oviedo Moderno	Total		63	19	0	0	0	0	0	0	63	19
Athletic Bilbao	2016–17	Primera División	23	5	1	0	—		2	0	26	5
Athletic Bilbao	2017–18	Primera División	27	4	3	3	—		—		30	7
Athletic Bilbao	2018–19	Primera División	22	13	2	0	—		—		24	13
Athletic Bilbao	2019–20	Primera División	18	9	3	1	—		—		21	10
Athletic Bilbao	2020–21	Primera División	29	16	0	0	—		—		29	16
Athletic Bilbao	2021–22	Primera División	29	12	2	0	—		—		31	12
Athletic Bilbao	Total		148	59	11	4	0	0	2	0	161	63
Manchester United	2022–23	Women's Super League	20	8	5	0	3	0	—		28	8
Manchester United	2023–24	Women's Super League	22	3	4	4	4	1	2	0	32	8
Manchester United	Total		42	11	9	4	7	1	2	0	60	16
Monterrey	2024–25	Liga MX Femenil	12	5	0	0	—		4	3	16	8
Career total			265	94	20	8	7	1	8	3	300	106

=== International ===
As of match played 3 December 2024

Appearances and goals by national team and year
National team	Year	Apps	Goals
Spain	2018	8	0
Spain	2019	12	1
Spain	2020	4	4
Spain	2021	3	1
Spain	2022	10	3
Spain	2023	5	1
Spain	2024	15	2
Total		57	12

As of 4 June 2024

Scores and results list Spain's goal tally first, score column indicates score after each García goal.

List of international goals scored by Lucía García
No.	Date	Cap	Venue	Opponent	Score	Result	Competition
1	8 June 2019	15	Stade Océane, Le Havre, France	South Africa	3–1	3–1	2019 FIFA World Cup
2	5 March 2020	21	Exploria Stadium, Orlando, United States	Japan	2–1	3–1	2020 SheBelieves Cup
3	5 March 2020	21	Exploria Stadium, Orlando, United States	Japan	3–1	3–1	2020 SheBelieves Cup
4	19 September 2020	24	Zimbru Stadium, Chișinău, Moldova	Moldova	1–0	9–0	UEFA Euro 2022 qualifying
5	19 September 2020	24	Zimbru Stadium, Chișinău, Moldova	Moldova	5–0	9–0	UEFA Euro 2022 qualifying
6	16 September 2021	26	Tórsvøllur, Tórshavn, Faroe Islands	Faroe Islands	6–0	10–0	2023 FIFA World Cup qualification
7	25 June 2022	32	Nuevo Colombino, Huelva, Spain	Australia	4–0	7–0	Friendly
8	25 June 2022	32	Nuevo Colombino, Huelva, Spain	Australia	5–0	7–0	Friendly
9	8 July 2022	34	Stadium MK, Milton Keynes, England	Finland	3–1	4–1	UEFA Euro 2022
10	26 September 2023	39	Nuevo Arcángel, Córdoba, Spain	Switzerland	1–0	5–0	2023–24 Nations League
11	4 June 2024	46	Heliodoro Rodríguez López, Santa Cruz de Tenerife, Spain	Denmark	3–2	3–2	UEFA Euro 2025 qualifying
12	3 December 2024	57	Stade de Nice, Nice, France	France	3–1	4–2	Friendly
13	21 February 2025	58	Estadi Ciutat de València, Valencia, Spain	Belgium	2–2	3–2	2025 Nations League

== Honours ==
Manchester United

- Women's FA Cup: 2023–24; runner-up: 2022–23

Spain

- UEFA Women's Championship runner-up: 2025
- UEFA Women's Nations League: 2023–24
- Cyprus Cup: 2018

Spain U20

- FIFA U-20 Women's World Cup runner-up: 2018

Spain U19

- UEFA Women's Under-19 Championship: 2017; runner-up: 2016

Spain U17

- UEFA Women's Under-17 Championship: 2015
