= Nagore Calderón =

Spanish footballer (born 1993)

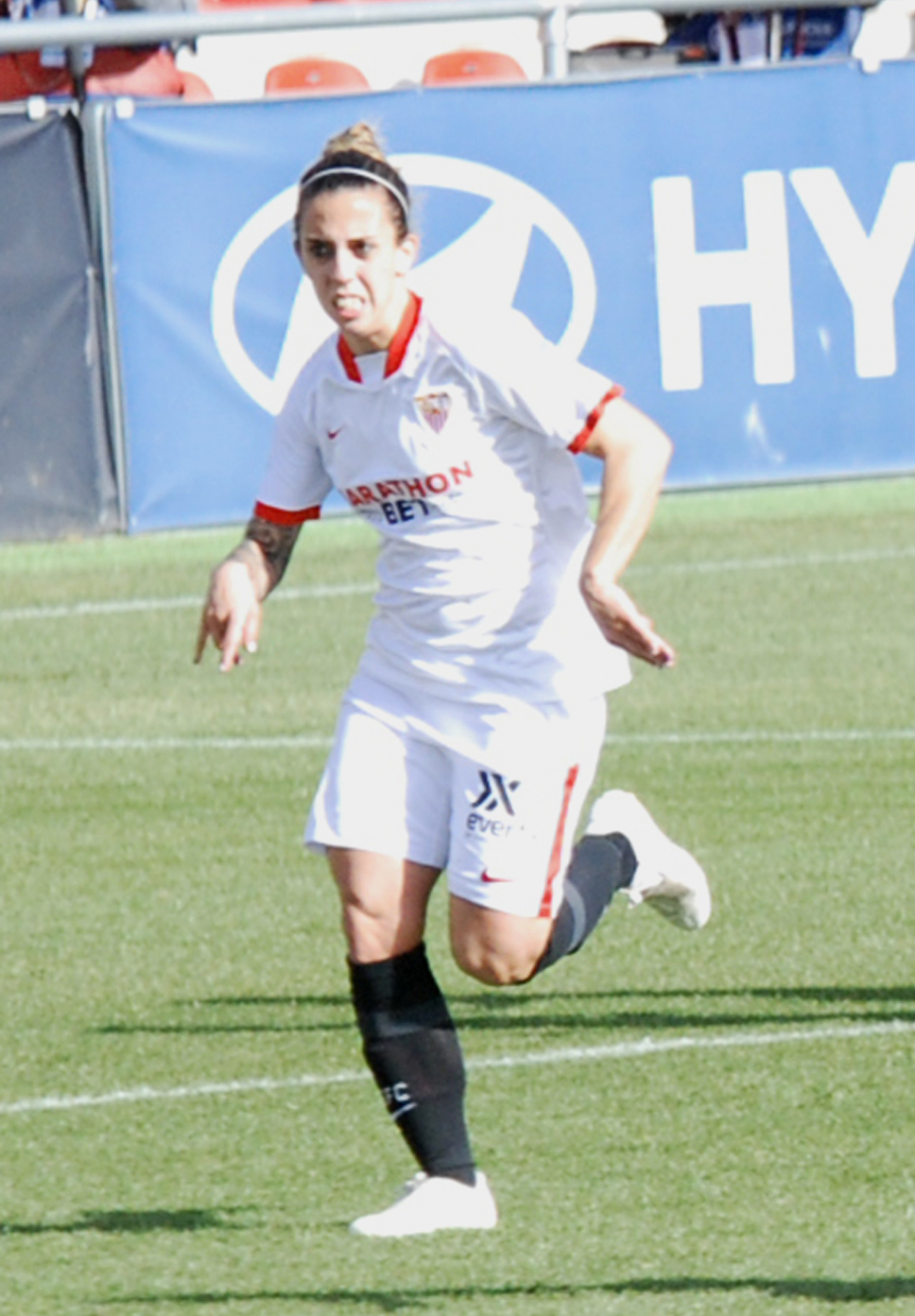

Personal information
- Full name: Nagore Calderón Rodríguez
- Date of birth: 2 June 1993 (age 33)
- Place of birth: Madrid, Spain
- Height: 1.56 m (5 ft 1 in)
- Position: Central midfielder

Team information
- Current team: Sevilla
- Number: 6

Youth career
- Atlético Concilio
- 2005–2009: Atlético Madrid

Senior career*
Years	Team	Apps	(Gls)
2009–2016	Atlético Madrid		
2016–2017	Levante	28	(1)
2017–2023	Sevilla	159	(8)

International career
2012–2015	Spain	12	(2)
- * Club domestic league appearances and goals as of 5 May 2019

Nagore Calderón Rodríguez (born 2 June 1993) is a Spanish football midfielder who plays for Primera División club Sevilla. She was a member of the Spain national team between 2012 and 2015.

== Career ==
Calderón started to play football in Atlético Concilio and when she was 12 years old she went to Atlético Madrid. In 2016, she moved to Levante UD then one year later, to newly-promoted Sevilla FC.

== International career ==
In October 2012 she made her debut for the Spain women's national football team in the second leg of the 2013 European Championship's repêchage, which marked Spain's second qualification for the championship, sixteen years after their first. As a junior international she won the 2010 U-17 European Championship and a bronze in the 2010 U-17 World Cup.

In June 2013, national team coach Ignacio Quereda called Calderón up to his 23-player squad for the UEFA Women's Euro 2013 finals in Sweden.

Goals for the Spanish WNT in official competitions
Competition	Stage	Date	Location	Opponent	Goals	Result	Overall
2015 FIFA World Cup	Qualifiers	2014–04–10	Skopje	North Macedonia	2	10–0	2
