= Mari Paz =

Spanish footballer (born 1982)

Personal information
- Full name: María Paz Azagra Navascues
- Date of birth: 23 August 1982 (age 44)
- Place of birth: Azkoitia, Spain
- Position: Midfielder

Senior career*
Years	Team	Apps	(Gls)
2000–2001	Lagunak		
2001–2002	Southampton Saints		
2002–2006	Lagunak		
2006–2010	Rayo Vallecano		

International career
2001–2008	Spain	13	(2)
2006–2007	Basque Country	2	(1)
- * Club domestic league appearances and goals

María Paz Azagra Navascues (born 23 August 1982), commonly known as Mari Paz, is a former Spanish football midfielder. She played for SD Lagunak and Rayo Vallecano in Spain's Superliga Femenina, and Southampton Saints in England's Premier League.

She was a member of the Spanish national team.

== Career statistics ==
No.	Date	Venue	Opponent	Score	Result	Competition
1.	30 May 2007	Spartak Stadium, Bobruisk, Belarus	Belarus	2–0	3–0	UEFA Women's Euro 2009 qualifying

== Honours ==
- 2 Spanish leagues (2009, 2010)
