= Enith Salón =

Spanish footballer (born 2001)

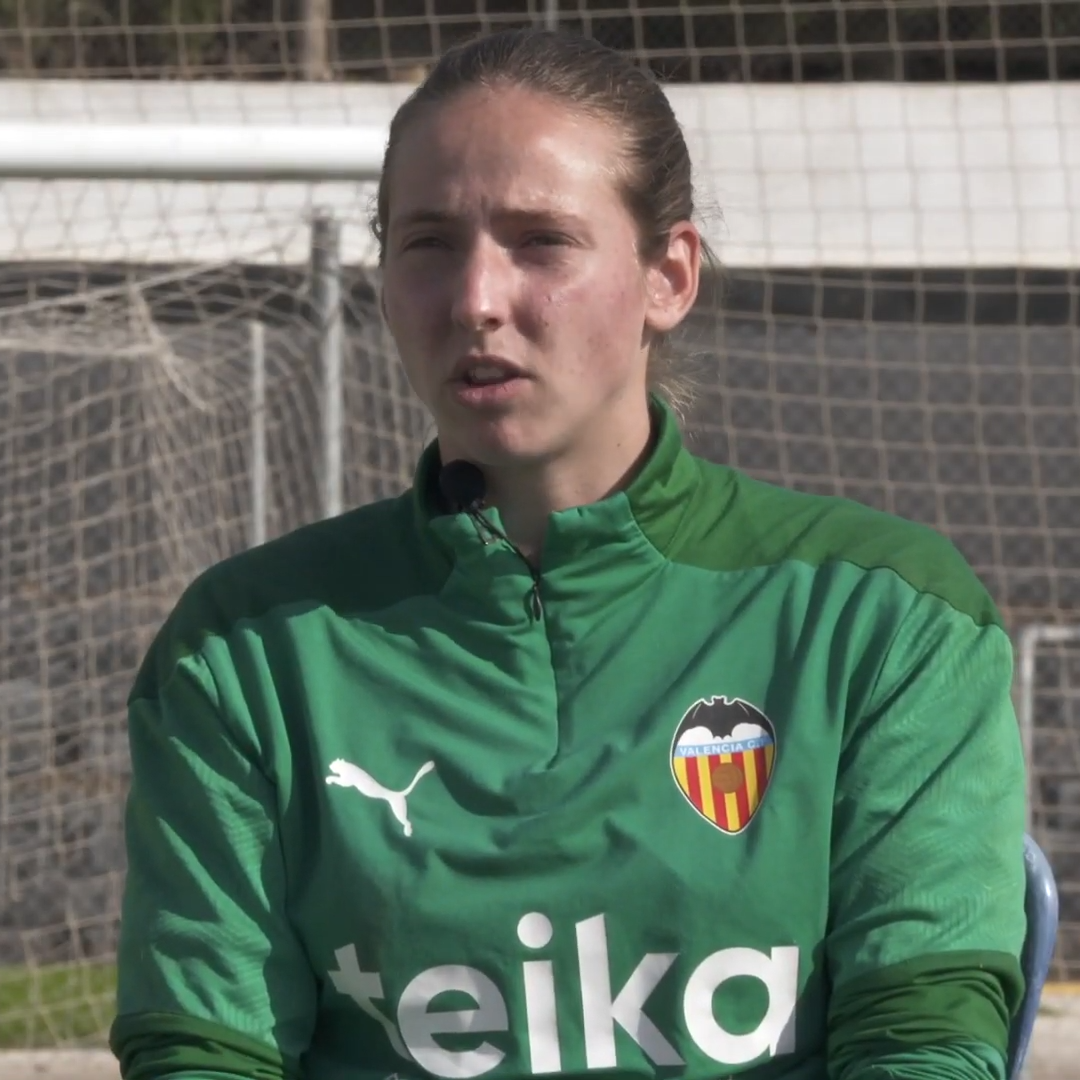

Personal information
- Full name: Enith Salón Marcuello
- Date of birth: 24 September 2001 (age 25)
- Place of birth: Moncada, Spain
- Height: 1.67 m (5 ft 6 in)
- Position: Goalkeeper

Team information
- Current team: Valencia
- Number: 1

Senior career*
| Years | Team | Apps | (Gls) |
| 2015–2016 | Valencia D | | |
| 2016–2018 | Valencia C | | |
| 2018–2020 | Valencia B | 6+ | (0) |
| 2018– | Valencia | 80 | (0) |

International career^{‡}
| 2022 | Spain U23 | 1 | (0) |
| 2022– | Spain | 2 | (0) |
Medal record
Women's football
Representing Spain
FIFA Women's World Cup
| Winner | 2023 Australia–New Zealand |
- * Club domestic league appearances and goals as of 06:08, 23 December 2023 (UTC) ‡ National team caps and goals as of 06:08, 23 December 2023 (UTC)

Enith Salón Marcuello (born 24 September 2001) is a Spanish professional footballer who plays as a goalkeeper for Valencia CF and the Spain women's national team.

== Club career ==
Salón started her career at Valencia D. She made her debut for the senior team in the Primera División on 4 October 2020 at the start of the season, in a 2-1 win over Sporting de Huelva. As the season progressed, she made a few appearances and quickly became the first-choice goalkeeper. With a few exceptions, she has held this position continuously ever since.

== International career ==
Salón took part in the U-19 European Championship with the Spain U-19, but did not play here. Having made her debut for the U-23s in September 2022, she also made her debut for the senior national team on 11 November 2022, playing entirely in a 7–0 friendly home win over Argentina. The next year she also got an assignment at the 2023 Cup of Nations.

On 30 June 2023 she was selected for the final squad at the 2023 World Cup.

== Honors ==
Spain

- FIFA Women's World Cup: 2023
