= Jorge Vilda =

Spanish football manager (born 1981)

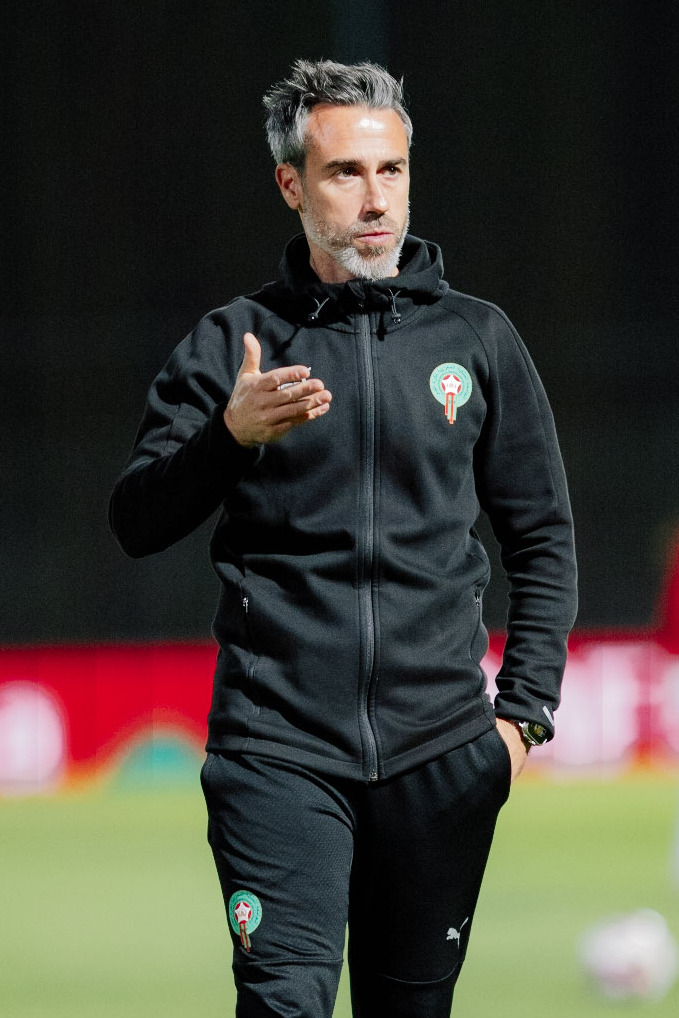
- Vilda at Moulay El Hassan Stadium in 2024

Personal information
- Full name: Jorge Vilda Rodríguez
- Date of birth: 7 July 1981 (age 45)
- Place of birth: Madrid, Spain

Youth career
- Years: Team
- 1991–1995: Barcelona/ Leno juniors
- 1995–1996: Rayo Vallecano
- 1996–1998: Real Madrid

Managerial career
- 2009–2013: Spain women U19 (assistant)
- 2009–2014: Spain women U17
- 2014–2015: Barcelona women (assistant)
- 2015–2023: Spain women
- 2018–2019: Spain women U19
- 2023–2026: Morocco women
- 2024–2026: Morocco women U20
Medal record
Women's football
Representing Morocco
Women's Africa Cup of Nations
| Runner-up | 2024 Morocco |
Women's football
Representing Spain
FIFA Women's World Cup
| Winner | 2023 Australia–New Zealand |
UEFA Women's Under-19 Championship
| Winner | 2018 Switzerland |
| Runner-up | 2014 Norway |
| Runner-up | 2015 Israel |
FIFA U-17 Women's World Cup
| Runner-up | 2014 Costa Rica |
| Third place | 2010 Trinidad and Tobago |
UEFA Women's Under-17 Championship
| Winner | 2010 Switzerland |
| Winner | 2011 Switzerland |
| Runner-up | 2014 England |
| Third place | 2013 Switzerland |

Jorge Vilda Rodríguez (born 7 July 1981) is a Spanish football coach. He was previously the head coach of the Spain women's national football team from 2015 to 2023, winning the 2023 Women's World Cup. Vilda was also sporting director of the RFEF's women's national team system and tactical instructor at their National Coaching School.

== Early life ==
Vilda's father, Ángel, worked as a fitness trainer at a number of Spanish clubs, and went on to coach the Spain women's under-17 and under-19 teams.

Vilda suffered from Osgood-Schlatter disease and suffered injuries to his patellar tendon which ended his hopes of playing professional football. He changed his focus to coaching, completing a degree in Physical Education and a master's degree in injury rehabilitation while working for CD Canillas.

== Career ==
=== Spain women's youth national football teams, 2009–15, 2018 ===
==== Under-17 ====
A former youth player at the academies of Barcelona, Rayo Vallecano and Real Madrid, Vilda began as an assistant coach to his father at the women's under-17 level before taking the head coach's position with Spain women's under-17 team in 2009. At the U-17 Euro, Spain won gold in 2010 and 2011, silver in 2014, and bronze in 2013. They also achieved third place at the 2010 U-17 World Cup and second place at the 2014 tournament.

==== Under-19 ====
In 2014, Vilda was among the ten nominees for the FIFA World Coach of the Year for Women's Football, and was appointed to be head coach of Spain women's under-19 team. The team collected silver medals at the 2014 and 2015 U-19 Euro tournaments.

Additionally, Vilda oversaw Spain's victory at the 2018 U-19 Euro, which — alongside his role with the senior national team — contributed to his shortlisting for the award of The Best FIFA Woman's Coach 2018.

=== Spain women's national team, 2015–23 ===
==== 2015–2022: Appointment and growing momentum ====
Appointed Spain's senior head coach in 2015, succeeding Ignacio Quereda, Vilda oversaw a successful qualifying campaign for the 2017 Euro. At the competition in the Netherlands, Spain reached the quarter-finals where they lost on penalties to Austria.

In 2018, Spain won the Cyprus Cup and also secured their place at the 2019 Women's World Cup – only their second appearance at the tournament.

By 2019, many of the players that Vilda had worked with at youth level —including Alexia Putellas, Lola Gallardo, Patri Guijarro, Mariona Caldentey, and Ivana Andrés — had established themselves as regular senior-squad members. At the 2019 World Cup, Spain qualified for the knockout stages for the first time at a Women's World Cup. Drawn against reigning champions the United States in the Round of 16, two penalties from Megan Rapinoe lead to Spain's elimination.

Vilda and Spain's momentum continued into 2020, with La Roja finishing second in the SheBelieves Cup.

At the 2022 Euro, Spain were defeated in the quarter-finals by eventual champions England.

==== 2022–23: Player dispute and World Cup victory ====
In September 2022, a dispute broke out between Vilda and fifteen Spanish players who boycotted the national team. The dispute arose after what the players, dubbed Las 15, perceived as a disappointing result at the Euro, as well as their concerns around Vilda's coaching style and treatment of players.

The RFEF supported Vilda, who refused to resign and did not call up Las 15 for the following matches. Thirteen of the fifteen returned to the national team and competed in the 2023 Women's World Cup in which Spain became world champions after defeating England in the final.

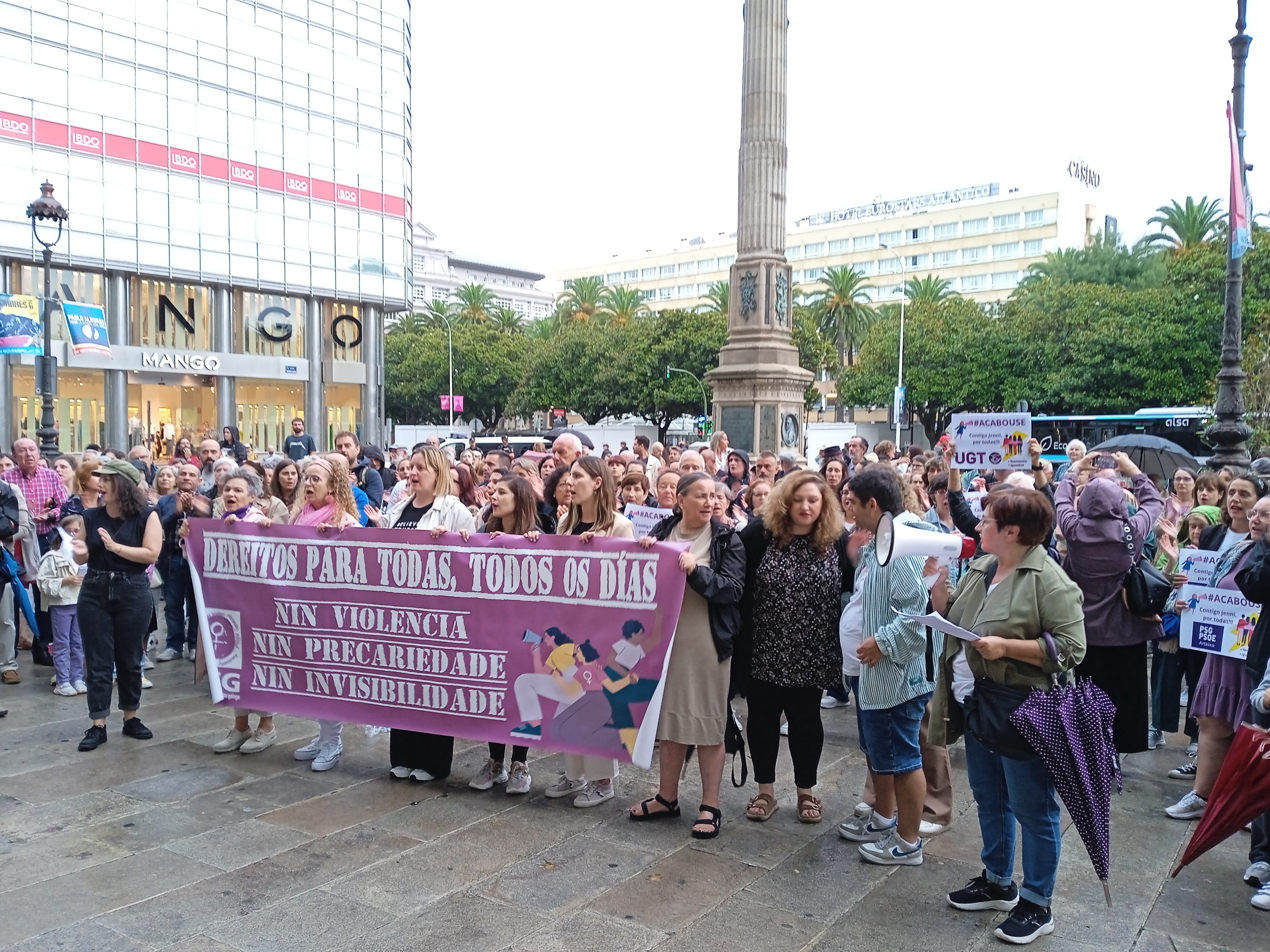
"#Acabouse" protest 28 August 2023

On 5 September 2023, following the allegations of inappropriate behaviour and subsequent suspension of RFEF President Luis Rubiales, Vilda was dismissed as head coach by the acting president, Pedro Rocha. On 7 September 2023, Vilda threatened legal action against the RFEF. On 27 September 2023, Vilda's status in the court case against Rubiales was upgraded from that of witness to suspect and he was required to testify on 9 October. Despite leaving Spain to coach Morocco's national team, Vilda remained under investigation. On 20 February 2025, Vilda was acquitted on the coercion charges involving Rubiales.

=== Morocco women's national team, 2023– ===
On 12 October 2023, Vilda became the new head coach of the Moroccan women's team. He was recommended to the Royal Moroccan Football Federation by the RFEF.

Vilda was nominated for the African Women's Coach of the Year Award in 2025.

== Managerial honours ==
Spain U17 women

- UEFA Women's Under-17 Championship: 2010, 2011; runner-up: 2014; third place: 2013
- FIFA U-17 Women's World Cup runner-up: 2014; third place: 2010

Spain U19 women

- UEFA Women's Under-19 Championship: 2018; runner-up: 2014, 2015

Spain women

- FIFA Women's World Cup: 2023
- Algarve Cup: 2017
- Cyprus Cup: 2018

Morocco women

- Women's Africa Cup of Nations runner-up: 2024

Individual

- FIFA World Coach of the Year for Women's Football; Shortlisted in 2018
- CAF Women's Coach of the Year; Shortlisted in 2025
