= Ignacio Quereda =

Spanish football coach (born 1950)

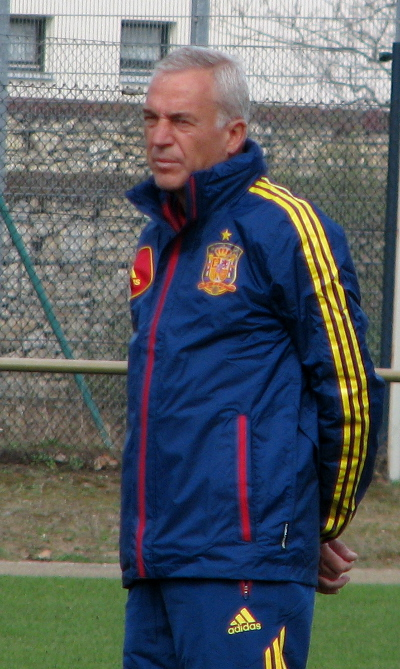

Personal information
- Full name: Ignacio Quereda Laviña
- Date of birth: 24 July 1950 (age 76)
- Place of birth: Madrid, Spain
- Position: Right winger

Youth career
- Years: Team
- 1968–1969: Real Madrid

Managerial career
- 1988–2015: Spain women
- 2002–2008: Spain U-19 women

Ignacio Quereda Laviña (born 24 July 1950) is a Spanish football coach who managed the Spain women's national football team between 1988 and 2015.

== Playing career ==
Born in Madrid, Quereda was raised in Badajoz where his family moved when he was two weeks old. He was a right–winger in Real Madrid's youth teams and represented victorious Spain teams in the 1973 and 1975 editions of the World University Games. After obtaining his coaching certificate, he was Spain's assistant coach at the 1979 World University Games and spent a period in charge of Tercera División club CD Móstoles.

== Coaching career ==
The Royal Spanish Football Federation (RFEF) appointed Quereda as women's national team coach in 1988, a position he has held until 2015, which makes him one of the longest serving football coaches of all time. This has led to criticisms to the RFEF of indifference for the women's national team. Under his management the Spanish team has qualified for the European Championships in 1997 and 2013. In 2014, the team qualified for their first World Cup after defeating Romania 2–0 in qualifiers. He also led the national Under-19 squad to a win in the 2004 UEFA Women's Under-19 Championship. In May 2011 Laura del Río, a striker with 40 goals in 39 caps for Spain, said that she would never play for the national team again while Quereda was still in charge. According to del Río, many other players had also refused to play for Quereda.

As an RFEF official, in 2009, he launched a controversial reform of the Superliga Femenina, expanding it from 16 to 24 teams in a two-stage three-group format, despite the opposition of most teams and players in the championship. The reform was cancelled two years later.

In 2015, Quereda guided Spain to their first ever FIFA Women's World Cup. After Spain's poor performance and early elimination from the tournament in Canada, the entire 23-player squad publicly called for him to be sacked. His resignation was confirmed after 139 matches (38.13% win) on 30 July 2015.

After his removal, a number of players gave retroactive accounts of abuse and bigotry by Quereda, collected in a documentary called Breaking The Silence.
