= Spain women's national football team =

Spain
- Nickname: La Roja (The Red One)
- Association: Real Federación Española de Fútbol (RFEF)
- Confederation: UEFA (Europe)
- Head coach: Sonia Bermúdez
- Captain: Irene Paredes
- Most caps: Alexia Putellas (150)
- Top scorer: Jenni Hermoso (57)
- FIFA code: ESP
First colours	Second colours

FIFA ranking
- Current: 1 (20 October 2026)
- Highest: 1 (December 2023 – June 2024, since August 2025)
- Lowest: 21 (June – August 2004; March 2008)

First international
- Unofficial; Spain 3–3 Portugal (Murcia, Spain; 21 February 1971); Official; Spain 0–1 Portugal (A Guarda, Spain; 5 February 1983)

Biggest win
- Spain 17–0 Slovenia (Palamós, Spain; 20 March 1994)

Biggest defeat
- Spain 0–8 Sweden (Gandia, Spain; 2 June 1996)

World Cup
- Appearances: 3 (first in 2015)
- Best result: Champions (2023)

Olympic Games
- Appearances: 1 (first in 2024)
- Best result: Fourth place (2024)

European Championship
- Appearances: 5 (first in 1997)
- Best result: Runners-up (2025)

Nations League Finals
- Appearances: 2 (first in 2024)
- Best result: Champions (2024, 2025)
Medal record
FIFA Women's World Cup
Gold medal – first place	2023 Australia-New Zealand	Team
UEFA Women's Championship
Silver medal – second place	2025 Switzerland	Team
UEFA Women's Nations League
Gold medal – first place	2025 France, Germany, Spain & Sweden	Team
Gold medal – first place	2024 France, Netherlands & Spain	Team

The Spain women's national football team, officially known as the Spain national football team (Spanish: Selección Española de Fútbol), has represented Spain in international women's football competitions since 1981. It is governed by the Royal Spanish Football Federation, the governing body for football in Spain.

Spain are the reigning and one of five national teams to have been crowned world champions, having qualified three times for the FIFA Women's World Cup and winning the title in 2023. Spain and Germany are the only countries to have won both women's and men's World Cups. They became the first nation in the women's game to be the world champions in all three categories (U-17, U-20 and senior level) at the same time.

At continental level, Spain won the first edition of the UEFA Women's Nations League in 2024, becoming the first nation to win both women's and men's competitions. They won the title again in 2025. They also have qualified five times for the UEFA Women's Championship, reaching the final in 2025, lost on penalties.

== History ==
=== Early years ===
After underground women's football clubs started appearing in Spain around 1970, one of its instigators, Rafael Muga, decided to create a national team. It was an unofficial project as football was considered an unsuitable sport for women by both the Royal Spanish Football Federation and National Movement's Women's Section, which organized women's sports in Francoist Spain. When asked about the initiative in January 1971 RFEF president José Luis Pérez Payá answered "I'm not against women's football, but I don't like it either. I don't think it's feminine from an aesthetic point of view. Women are not favored wearing shirts and shorts. Any regional dress would fit them better".

One month later, on 21 February 1971, the unofficial Spanish national team, including Conchi Sánchez, who played professionally in the Italian league, made its debut in Murcia's La Condomina against Portugal, ending in a 3–3 draw. The team wasn't allowed to wear RFEF's crest and the referee couldn't wear an official uniform either. On 15 July, with a 5-days delay for transfer issues, it played its first game abroad against Italy in Turin's Stadio Comunale, suffering an 8–1 defeat. It was then invited to the 2nd edition of unofficial women's world cup (Mundialito 1981), but RFEF forbid them to take part in the competition. Despite these conditions Spain was entrusted hosting the 1972 World Cup. RFEF vetoed the project, and the competition was cancelled and disbanded. The unofficial Spanish team itself broke up shortly after.

=== 1980s: Officiality of the team ===
After the transition to democracy in the second half of the decade RFEF finally accepted women's football in November 1980, creating first a national cup and next a national team, which finally made its debut under coach Teodoro Nieto on 5 February 1983 in A Guarda, Pontevedra. The opponent was again Portugal, which defeated Spain 0–1. The team subsequently played 2-leg friendlies against France and Switzerland drawing with both opponents in Aranjuez and Barcelona and losing in Perpignan before it finally clinched its first victory in Zürich (0–1). On 27 April 1985 it played its first official match in the 1987 European Championship's qualification, losing 1–0 against Hungary. After losing the first four matches Spain defeated Switzerland and drew with Italy to end third. The team also ended in its group's bottom positions in the subsequent 1989 and 1991 qualifiers. In 1988 Nieto was replaced as manager by Ignacio Quereda, who went on to coach the team for the next 27 years. Years later Nieto would confess (in the book El fútbol femenino en 20 toques by David Menayo): "There was never love or support from the Federation towards those women football players"

Teodoro Nieto left international footballer Conchi Sanchez (Amancio) out of the Spanish team even though the player was the first captain during the 1970s and was winning championships in Italy.

=== 1990s and 2000s: Growing up ===
The 1995 Euro qualifying marked an improvement as Spain ended 2nd, one point from England, which qualified for the final tournament. In these qualifiers Spain attained its biggest victory to date, a 17–0 over Slovenia. In the 1997 Euro qualifying it made a weaker performance, including a record 0–8 loss against Sweden in Gandia, but the European Championship was expanded to eight teams and Spain still made it to the repechage, where it defeated England on a 3–2 aggregate to qualify for the competition for the first time. In the first stage the team drew 1–1 against France, lost 0–1 against host Sweden, and beat 1–0 Russia to qualify on goal average over France to the semifinals, where it was defeated 2–1 by Italy. All three goals were scored by Ángeles Parejo.

This success was followed by a long series of unsuccessful qualifiers. In the 1999 World Cup qualifying round, Spain ended last for the first time, not winning a single game. In the 2001 Euro's qualifiers, it made it to the repechage, where it suffered a 3–10 aggregate defeat against Denmark. In the 2003 World Cup qualifying stage, it again ended last despite starting with a 6–1 win over Iceland. In the 2005 Euro's qualifiers, where a 9–1 win over Belgium was followed by a 5-game non-scoring streak, it ended 3rd behind Denmark and Norway. In the 2007 World Cup qualifying round, the team again ended 3rd behind Denmark and Finland despite earning 7 more points.

In the 2009 Euro qualifiers, Spain made its best performance since the 1995 qualifiers, narrowly missing qualification as England clinched the top position by overcoming a 2–0 in the final match's second half. Spain had to play the repechage, where it lost both games against the Netherlands. In the 2011 World Cup, Spain again ended 2nd, with no repechage, after England again overcame a half-time 2–0 in their second confrontation.

=== 2010s: First World Cups ===
Spain finally achieved a place in the final stage of a European Championship, having qualified for the UEFA Women's Euro 2013 after beating Scotland in the qualifiers playoff. In the group stage, a win over England and a draw against Russia was enough to qualify for the quarterfinals, where they were eliminated by Norway.

Two years later, Spain qualified for the first time ever to a World Cup, winning nine of its ten matches of the qualifying round. In the group stage of the 2015 FIFA Women's World Cup, however, their campaign ended up being a disaster. Spain managed only a 1–1 draw into the weakest team in the group, Costa Rica, before losing 0–1 to Brazil. In their last match with South Korea, they lost 1–2 after an initial lead, becoming the worst European team in the tournament. After the World Cup, the 23 players on the roster issued a collective statement for the end of Ignacio Quereda's reign as head coach. Later that summer, Quereda stepped down and was replaced by Jorge Vilda, who had previously coached the U-19 team and was on the shortlist for the 2014 FIFA World Coach of the Year. Spain qualified for the UEFA Women's Euro 2017 by winning all its matches and finishing 11 points ahead of the second-placed team. In 2017 the national team participated for the first time in the Algarve Cup winning the tournament. However, its performance in the UEFA Women's Euro 2017 was very disappointing: only one match won (against Portugal, the worst ranked team in Euro), two defeats against England (0–2) and Scotland (0–1) in the group stage. Nevertheless, Spain advanced to the quarterfinals, at which point it lost against Austria in a match finishing 0–0 after extra time and then 3–5 in a penalty shoot-out. The national football team was therefore eliminated after more than 345 minutes without scoring a single goal.

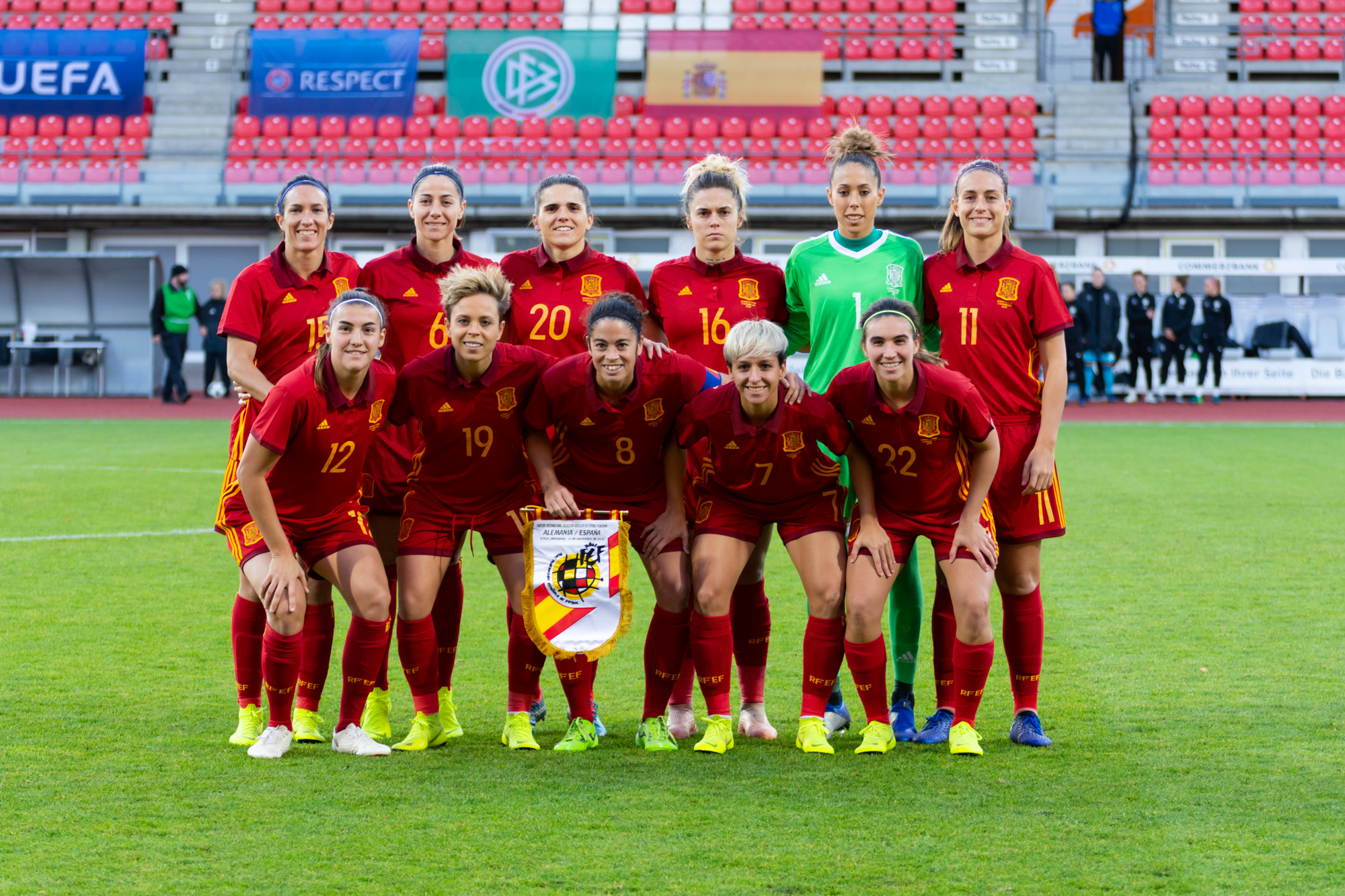
Spain women's national team in 2018

At the 2019 Women's World Cup, Spain were in Group B with China PR, South Africa, and Germany. They finished second in the group to progress to the knockout stage of a World Cup for the first time in their history. However, the team was eliminated in the round of 16 by the eventual champions United States.

In October 2019, the federation announced the creation of España Promesas (essentially Spain B), a team for players too old for younger age groups but not in the latest full squad, to provide training and occasional match experience for those in consideration for the future, that was later reconverted and renamed Spain under-23.

=== 2020s: Golden Generation ===
Spain broke into the top 10 of the FIFA World Rankings in the early 2020s, while their players won all the categories of the UEFA awards, the first time from a single nation in 2021.

Spain qualified for the UEFA Women's Euro 2022 undefeated and assembled what would be the strongest ever Spanish team in history, and was ranked among the top contenders for the title. However, just before the tournament began, Spain suffered two big blows, with both Jennifer Hermoso and Alexia Putellas withdrew due to sustaining injury. Without the two taliswomen in the squad, Spain failed to perform at full expectation in the tournament and only reached the quarter-finals in second place after Germany. Spain then performed well against England, even took the lead in 54' by Esther González, but conceded a late equalizer by Ella Toone before Georgia Stanway crushed Spain's hope to win a major European title in extra time.

==== 2022–23 dispute and withdrawal of las 15 ====
In September 2022, fifteen players sent an email removing themselves from national team consideration. Seven players who did not sign the letter claimed they were pressured by their club, Real Madrid, not to do so, a claim the club denied. The initial player complaints included poor quality of training under Vilda and his staff compared to their club environment, a lack of tactical preparation for matches, and claims of a controlling environment in which players would be frequently questioned about their whereabouts and shopping purchases. By April 2023, many of the players had entered talks with the federation.

==== 2023 FIFA Women's World Cup title and controversy ====
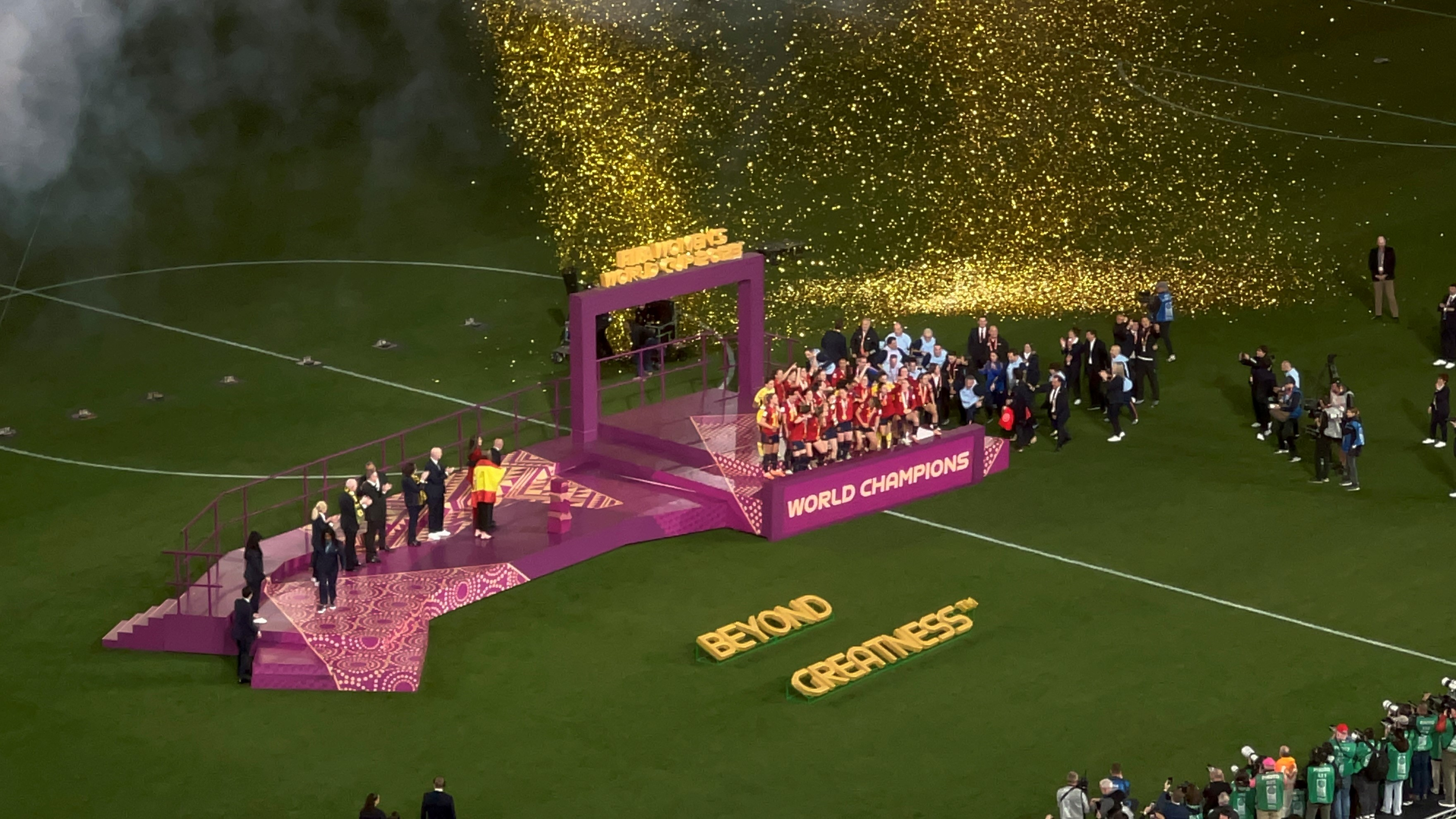
Spanish players celebrating winning the 2023 FIFA Women's World Cup.

At the 2023 World Cup, La Roja finished second in Group C. Spain then defeated Switzerland, the Netherlands and Sweden in the knockout stages to reach their first World Cup final. This Women's World Cup was also the first in which Spain reached a semi-final. Spain eventually won, winning their first World Cup title, by defeating England 1–0 in the final thanks to a goal from Olga Carmona.

During the trophy ceremony, the Spanish Football Federation (RFEF) President Luis Rubiales kissed Spain player Jenni Hermoso on the lips without her consent. Five days after winning the World Cup, 81 players (including the tournament squad) announced they would refuse to play for Spain until the leadership of the RFEF changed due to the Rubiales affair.

During the subsequent aftermath, The RFEF dropped the word "women" from the official title. Both men and women's teams now go by the gender neutral name "Seleccion Espanola de Futbol". The logo and the branding of both teams were also aligned. Each team has one star over the logo in honour of them winning a world cup each. In a quote, the then interim president Pedro Rocha said:

"Beyond a symbolic step, we want it to imply a change in concept, and the recognition that football is football, practiced by whoever practices it… We do not need, on any medium, to differentiate the brands of both teams; Depending on the context, depending on the images that accompany the logo, it is perfectly understood whether we are referring to our champions or our champions"

==== 2024 Nations League champions and debut at the Summer Olympics ====
With the creation of the UEFA Women's Nations League, Spain entered the competition in League A and as one of the heavy favorites to win it. After dominant wins against another one of the favorites Sweden, Spain topped their group and qualified to the final four of the competition. In the semifinals, Spain defeated the Netherlands 3–0 to advance to the first ever final and second final in their history. At the Nations League final, Spain faced France, a team La Roja had never beaten prior to their meeting. In a game controlled completely by La Roja, Spain defeated France for the very first time with a 2–0 score, thus claiming their second ever international trophy and becoming the first champions of the UEFA Nations League. Spain qualified their first ever team for the women's football tournament at the 2024 Summer Olympics in Paris. Spain finished atop Group C, winning all three of their group matches and accumulating nine points.

In the quarter-final against Colombia, Spain netted two late-game goals to made it 2–2. The match was ultimately decided via penalty shoot-out, in which Spain defeated Colombia 4–2. Despite being regarded as favorites to win the gold medal, Spain was defeated by Brazil in a match that was widely characterized as an upset. Publications took note of Brazil's dominance and Spain's lapses in defense. Spain were ultimately defeated by Germany in the bronze medal match as a result of the national team conceding a penalty kick, and missing one of their own in second-half stoppage time. Their inability to earn a medal was described as an underperformance.

== Results and fixtures ==
The following is a list of match results in the last 12 months, as well as any future matches that have been scheduled.

Legend

Win Draw Loss Fixture

=== 2025 ===
28 November 2025 Nations League Final	Germany	0–0	Spain	Kaiserslautern
20:30		Report		Stadium: Fritz-Walter-Stadion; Attendance: 40,156; Referee: Iuliana Demetrescu (Romania)

2 December 2025 Nations League Final	Spain	3–0 (3–0 agg.)	Germany	Madrid
18:30	Pina 61', 74'; López 68'	Report		Stadium: Metropolitano Stadium; Attendance: 55,843; Referee: Silvia Gasperotti (Italy)

=== 2026 ===
3 March World Cup 2027 qualifying	Spain	3–0	Iceland	Castelló de la Plana
19:00	Pina 39', 54'; Imade 76'	Report (FIFA); Report (UEFA)		Stadium: Estadio Municipal de Castalia; Attendance: 7,586; Referee: Emanuela Rusta (Albania)

7 March World Cup 2027 qualifying	Ukraine	1–3	Spain	Antalya, Turkey (Note: Due to the Russian invasion of Ukraine, Ukraine are required to play their home matches at neutral venues until further notice.)
20:00 UTC+3	Ovdiychuk 76'	Report (FIFA); Report (UEFA)	Imade 44'; Corrales 45+3'; López 55' (pen.)	Stadium: Mardan Sports Complex; Referee: Maïka Vanderstichel (France)

14 April World Cup 2027 qualifying	England	1–0	Spain	London
19:00 UTC+1	Hemp 3'	Report (FIFA); Report (UEFA)		Stadium: Wembley Stadium; Attendance: 62,306; Referee: Tess Olofsson (Sweden)

18 April World Cup 2027 qualifying	Spain	5–0	Ukraine	Córdoba
16:00	Imade 2', 47'; Méndez 61'; Navarro 71'; López 76'	Report (FIFA); Report (UEFA)		Stadium: Nuevo Arcángel; Attendance: 10,768; Referee: Fabienne Michel (Germany)

5 June World Cup 2027 qualifying	Spain	4–0	England	Palma
21:00	Guijarro 19'; Putellas 37', 55'; Pina 78'	Report (FIFA); Report (UEFA)		Stadium: Son Moix; Attendance: 17,528; Referee: Ivana Martinčić (Croatia)

9 June World Cup 2027 qualifying	Iceland	1–6	Spain	Reykjavík
19:00	Boama 58'	Report (FIFA); Report (UEFA)	López 5', 50'; Imade 37'; Paralluelo 45'; Pina 68'; Bonmatí 84'	Stadium: Laugardalsvöllur; Attendance: 2,517; Referee: Miriama Bočková (Slovenia)

10 October Friendly	United States	0–2	Spain	Washington, D.C.
14:37		Report	Guijarro 3'; Navarro 14'	Stadium: Audi Field; Attendance: 19,220; Referee: Diana Pérez (Mexico)

13 October Friendly	United States	2–2	Spain	Chester
19:00	Sanchez 49'; Swanson 86'	Report	Putellas 27'; Paralluelo 32'	Stadium: Subaru Park; Attendance: 18,648; Referee: Myriam Marcotte (Canada)

28 November Friendly	Spain	v	Chile	León
18:00				Stadium: Estadio Reino de León

4 December Friendly	Spain	v	Venezuela	A Coruña
21:00				Stadium: Riazor

== Coaching staff ==
=== Current personnel ===
Position	Name
Head coach	Sonia Bermúdez
Assistant coach	Iraia Iturregi
Goalkeeping coach	Carlos Sánchez
Goalkeeping coach	Ander Ruiz
Fitness coaches	Eduardo Caro
Fitness coaches	Blanca Romero
Analyst technician	Julen Itxaso
Video assistant	Adrià Millán

=== Managerial history ===
As of 14 October 2026

Manager	Tenure	P	W	D	L	Win %	Competitions
(Spain) Rafael Muga	February 1971 –October 1980	6	0	1	5	8.33%	unofficial matches
(Spain) María Teresa Andreu	May 1981 (interim)	1	0	0	1	0%	unofficial match
(Spain) Teodoro Nieto	September 1981 –30 June 1988	19	4	5	10	34.21%	None
(Spain) Ignacio Quereda	1 September 1988 –30 July 2015	142	52	38	52	50%	Euro 1997 SF; Euro 2013 QF; 2015 World Cup GS
(Spain) Jorge Vilda	30 July 2015 –5 September 2023	108	75	16	17	76.85%	Euro 2017 QF; 2019 World Cup R16; Euro 2022 QF; 2023 World Cup (gold)
(Spain) Montserrat Tomé	5 September 2023 –31 August 2025	37	28	4	5	81.08%	2024 Nations League (gold); 2024 Olympic Games SF; Euro 2025
(Spain) Sonia Bermúdez	1 September 2025–	12	9	2	1	83.33%	2025 Nations League (gold)

== Players ==
=== Current squad ===
The following 25 players were called up for the friendly matches against Chile and Venezuela on 29 October and December 4, 2026.

Caps and goals correct as of 14 October 2026, after the match against United States.

No.	Pos.	Player	Date of birth (age)	Caps	Goals	Club
	GK	Misa Rodríguez	23 July 1999 (age 27)	26	0	Arsenal
	GK	Adriana Nanclares	9 May 2002 (age 24)	8	0	Athletic Bilbao
	GK	Eunate Astralaga	30 November 2005 (age 20)	0	0	Athletic Bilbao
	DF	Olga Carmona (3rd captain)	12 June 2000 (age 26)	68	3	Paris Saint-Germain
	DF	Laia Codina	22 January 2000 (age 26)	28	2	West Ham United
	DF	María Méndez	10 April 2001 (age 25)	24	3	Real Madrid
	DF	Jana Fernández	18 February 2002 (age 24)	15	0	London City Lionesses
	DF	Aïcha Cámara	11 December 2006 (age 19)	0	0	Barcelona
	DF	Silvia Cristóbal	1 May 2008 (age 18)	0	0	Real Madrid
	DF	Lucía Rodríguez	24 May 1999 (age 27)	0	0	Atlético Madrid
	MF	Aitana Bonmatí (5th captain)	18 January 1998 (age 28)	89	32	Barcelona
	MF	Patricia Guijarro	17 May 1998 (age 28)	81	15	Barcelona
	MF	Eva Navarro	27 January 2001 (age 25)	33	7	Real Madrid
	MF	Fiamma Benítez	19 June 2004 (age 22)	15	2	Atlético Madrid
	MF	Lucía Corrales	24 November 2005 (age 20)	9	1	London City Lionesses
	MF	Clara Serrajordi	7 December 2007 (age 18)	8	0	Barcelona
	MF	Clara Pinedo	9 September 2003 (age 23)	2	0	Athletic Bilbao
	MF	Daniela Agote	27 August 2006 (age 20)	0	0	Athletic Bilbao
	MF	Júlia Bartel	18 May 2004 (age 22)	0	0	Juventus
	MF	Cecilia Marcos	3 November 2001 (age 25)	0	0	Real Sociedad
	MF	Sara Ortega	20 February 2005 (age 21)	0	0	Athletic Bilbao
	FW	Salma Paralluelo	13 November 2003 (age 23)	52	17	OL Lyonnes
	FW	Clàudia Pina	12 August 2001 (age 25)	30	17	Barcelona
	FW	Edna Imade	5 October 2000 (age 26)	10	5	Bayern Munich
	FW	Ainhoa Marín	21 March 2001 (age 25)	1	0	Real Sociedad

=== Recent call-ups ===
The following players have also been called up to the squad within the past 12 months.

Pos.	Player	Date of birth (age)	Caps	Goals	Club	Latest call-up
GK	Cata Coll ^{INJ}	23 April 2001 (age 25)	37	0	Barcelona	v. United States, 10 October 2026
GK	Enith Salón ^{PRE}	24 September 2001 (age 25)	2	0	Valencia	v. Iceland, 3 March 2026
DF	Irene Paredes (captain)	4 July 1991 (age 35)	129	14	Barcelona	v. United States, 13 October 2026
DF	Ona Batlle	10 June 1999 (age 27)	78	2	Arsenal	v. United States, 13 October 2026
DF	Oihane Hernández	4 May 2000 (age 26)	28	1	Orlando Pride	v. United States, 13 October 2026
DF	Andrea Medina	11 March 2004 (age 22)	2	0	Manchester United	v. United States, 13 October 2026
DF	Mapi León ^{INJ}	13 June 1995 (age 31)	62	1	London City Lionesses	v. United States, 10 October 2026
DF	Aiara Agirrezabala	2 October 2008 (age 18)	1	0	Real Sociedad	v. Ukraine, 18 April 2026
DF	Martina Fernández	1 October 2004 (age 22)	1	0	Barcelona	v. Ukraine, 7 March 2026
DF	Sandra Villafañe ^{PRE}	18 September 2005 (age 21)	0	0	Madrid CFF	v. Iceland, 3 March 2026
DF	Leila Ouahabi	22 March 1993 (age 33)	66	1	Gotham FC	2025 UEFA Women's Nations League Finals
DF	Laia Aleixandri	25 August 2000 (age 26)	50	3	Barcelona	2025 UEFA Women's Nations League Finals
MF	Alexia Putellas (vice-captain)	4 February 1994 (age 32)	150	43	London City Lionesses	v. United States, 13 October 2026
MF	Ornella Vignola	30 September 2004 (age 22)	3	0	Everton	v. United States, 13 October 2026
MF	Natalia Ramos	10 February 1999 (age 27)	2	0	Liverpool	v. United States, 13 October 2026
MF	Athenea del Castillo ^{SUS}	24 October 2000 (age 26)	71	18	Real Madrid	v. United States, 10 October 2026
MF	Vicky López ^{INJ}	26 July 2006 (age 20)	23	9	Barcelona	v. United States, 10 October 2026
MF	Inma Gabarro ^{INJ}	5 November 2002 (age 24)	7	2	Everton	v. Ukraine, 7 March 2026
FW	Lucía García	14 July 1998 (age 28)	59	13	Monterrey	v. United States, 13 October 2026
FW	Alba Redondo	27 August 1996 (age 30)	45	16	Juventus	v. United States, 13 October 2026
FW	Mariona Caldentey ^{INJ} (4th captain)	19 March 1996 (age 30)	104	31	Arsenal	v. United States, 10 October 2026
FW	Esther González	8 December 1992 (age 33)	61	37	Al-Qadsiah	v. Iceland, 9 June 2026
FW	Jenni Hermoso	9 May 1990 (age 36)	125	57	Atlético Madrid	2025 UEFA Women's Nations League Finals
FW	Cristina Martín-Prieto	14 March 1993 (age 33)	9	3	Galatasaray	2025 UEFA Women's Nations League Finals
Notes: ^{INJ} = Withdrew due to injury; ^{PRE} = Preliminary squad; ^{RET} = Retired from the national team; ^{SUS} = Serving suspension; ^{WD} = Withdrew due to non-injury issue

=== Previous squads ===
World Cup

- 2015 World Cup squad
- 2019 World Cup squad
- 2023 World Cup squad

Olympic Games

- 2024 Olympic squad

European Championship

- Euro 1997 squad
- Euro 2013 squad
- Euro 2017 squad
- Euro 2022 squad
- Euro 2025 squad

Others

- Grand Hotel Varna Tournament 1992 squad
- Algarve Cup 2017 squad
- Cyprus Cup 2018 squad
- Algarve Cup 2019 squad
- SheBelieves Cup 2020 squad
- Arnold Clark Cup 2022 squad
- Cup of Nations 2023 squad

== Honours ==
=== Major titles ===
- FIFA Women's World Cup

(gold) Champions: 2023

- UEFA Women's European Championship

(silver) Runners-up: 2025

- UEFA Women's Nations League

(gold) Champions (2): 2024, 2025

=== Minor titles ===
- Algarve Cup

Champions: 2017

- Cyprus Cup

Champions: 2018

- SheBelieves Cup

Runners-up: 2020

- Arnold Clark Cup

Runners-up: 2022

- Cup of Nations

Runners-up: 2023

- Grand Hotel Varna Tournament

Third place: 1995

=== Other awards ===
- Premios Nacionales del Deporte (National Sports Awards): Best national sports team (2014)
- Gold Medal of the Royal Order of Sporting Merit (2023)
- Laureus World Sports Award for Team of the Year (2024)

== Records ==
As of 14 October 2026

Players in bold are still active with the national team.

=== Most capped players ===
#	Player	Career	Caps	Goals
1	**Alexia Putellas**	2013–present	150	43
2	**Irene Paredes**	2011–present	129	14
3	Jenni Hermoso	2012–2025	125	57
4	**Mariona Caldentey**	2017–present	104	31
5	Marta Torrejón	2007–2019	90	8
6	**Aitana Bonmatí**	2017–present	89	32
7	Marta Corredera	2013–2021	85	5
8	**Patricia Guijarro**	2017–present	81	15
9	**Ona Batlle**	2019–present	78	2
10	Arantza del Puerto	1990–2005	71	0

=== Top goalscorers ===
#	Player	Career	Goals	Caps	Avg,
1	Jenni Hermoso (list)	2012–2025	57	125	0.46
2	**Alexia Putellas** (list)	2013–present	43	150	0.29
3	Verónica Boquete	2005–2017	38	56	0.68
4	**Esther González**	2016–present	37	61	0.61
5	Sonia Bermúdez	2008–2017	34	61	0.56
6	Adriana Martín	2005–2015	33	39	0.85
7	**Aitana Bonmatí**	2017–present	32	89	0.36
8	**Mariona Caldentey**	2017–present	31	104	0.30
9	Marimar Prieto	1985–2000	29	62	0.47
10	**Athenea del Castillo**	2020–present	18	71	0.25

=== Captains ===
List of captains by appearances as captain

Player	Span
Conchi Sánchez	1971–81
Inmaculada Castañón	1983–88
Francina Pubill	1989–91
Itziar Bakero	1991–95
Beatriz García	1995–96
Arantza del Puerto	1996–2005
Maider Castillo	2005–07
Itziar Gurrutxaga	2007–08
Vanesa Gimbert	2008
Melisa Nicolau	2008–10
Sandra Vilanova	2011–13
Verónica Boquete	2013–17
Marta Torrejón	2017–19
Irene Paredes	2019–22; 2024–
Ivana Andrés	2022–23
Alexia Putellas	2023

=== Hat-tricks ===
Player	Against	Venue	Result	Date	Competition
Mar Prieto^{7}	Slovenia	Home	17–0	20 March 1994	1995 EURO Q
Mercedes González	Slovenia	Home	17–0	20 March 1994	1995 EURO Q
Mar Prieto	Romania	Home	5–1	31 March 1996	1997 EURO Q
Laura del Río^{5}	Belgium	Home	7–0	29 February 2004	2005 EURO Q
Adriana Martín^{5}	Poland	Home	7–0	30 March 2006	2007 WC Q
Adriana Martín^{4}	Malta	Away	0–13	19 September 2009	2011 WC Q
Sonia Bermúdez	Malta	Away	0–13	19 September 2009	2011 WC Q
Ana Romero	Malta	Away	0–13	19 September 2009	2011 WC Q
Adriana Martín	Turkey	Away	0–5	21 November 2009	2011 WC Q
Adriana Martín^{4}	Malta	Home	9–0	24 June 2010	2011 WC Q
Verónica Boquete	Turkey	Away	1–10	17 September 2011	2013 EURO Q
Mari Paz Vilas^{7}	Kazakhstan	Home	13–0	5 April 2012	2013 EURO Q
Natalia Pablos^{5}	Macedonia	Home	12–0	13 February 2014	2015 WC Q
Sonia Bermúdez	Macedonia	Away	0–10	10 April 2014	2015 WC Q
Jenni Hermoso	Macedonia	Away	0–10	10 April 2014	2015 WC Q
Sonia Bermúdez^{5}	Montenegro	Home	13–0	15 September 2016	2017 EURO Q
Verónica Boquete^{4}	Montenegro	Home	13–0	15 September 2016	2017 EURO Q
Mariona Caldentey	Moldova	Away	0–9	19 September 2020	2021 EURO Q
Jenni Hermoso	Moldova	Home	10–0	27 November 2020	2021 EURO Q
Esther González^{5}	Azerbaijan	Away	0–13	18 February 2021	2021 EURO Q
Jenni Hermoso^{5}	Azerbaijan	Away	0–13	18 February 2021	2021 EURO Q
Amaiur Sarriegi^{4}	Faroe Islands	Away	0–10	16 September 2021	2023 WC Q
Esther González^{4}	Faroe Islands	Home	12–0	25 November 2021	2023 WC Q
Mariona Caldentey	Faroe Islands	Home	12–0	25 November 2021	2023 WC Q
Salma Paralluelo	Argentina	Home	7–0	11 November 2022	Friendly
Salma Paralluelo	Belgium	Away	0–7	5 April 2024	2025 EURO Q

^{X} The superscript indicates the number of goals scored by each player in that match

=== Most clean sheets ===
#	Name	Career	Clean sheets	Caps	Average	Goals conceded	Ratio
1	Sandra Paños	2012–2022	**26**	55	47.27%	31	0.56
2	Lola Gallardo	2013–2022	**21**	38	55.26%	20	0.53
3	Ainhoa Tirapu	2007–2015	**20**	46	43.48%	38	0.83
4	**Cata Coll**	2023–	**16**	37	43.24%	29	0.78
5	**Misa Rodríguez**	2021–	**13**	26	50%	22	0.85
5	Roser Serra	1991–1998	**13**	33	39.39%	36	1.09
7	**Adriana Nanclares**	2024–	**5**	8	62.5%	5	0.63
8	Elixabete Capa	1998–2005	4	26	15.38%	29	1.12
9	Ana Ruiz Mitxelena	1984–1988	**3**	15	20%	13	0.87
9	Lucía Muñoz Mendoza	2005–2006	**3**	8	37.5%	14	1.75

Clean Sheets: Goalkeeper must play at least 60 minutes to obtain the points of a clean sheet.
Average: percentage of clean sheets achieved per game
Ratio: goals conceded per game

=== Individual awards ===
- FIFA Women's World Cup golden ball: Aitana Bonmatí (2023)
- FIFA Women's World Cup silver ball: Jennifer Hermoso (2023)
- FIFA Women's World Cup best young player: Salma Paralluelo (2023)
- UEFA Women's Euro best player: Aitana Bonmatí (2025)
- UEFA Women's Euro top scorer: Esther González (2025)
- UEFA Women's Euro All-Star Team: Ángeles Parejo (1997), Verónica Boquete (2013), Aitana Bonmatí (2022, 2025), Patricia Guijarro (2025), Irene Paredes (2025), Alexia Putellas (2025)
- UEFA Women's Nations League best player: Aitana Bonmatí (2024), Alexia Putellas (2025)
- UEFA Women's Nations League top-scorer: Clàudia Pina (2025)
- FIFA Women's World Cup qualification top-scorer: Adriana Martín (2011)
- Algarve Cup best player: Irene Paredes (2017)
- Algarve Cup top scorer: Jennifer Hermoso (2019)
- Arnold Clark Cup best player: Athenea del Castillo (2022)
- Arnold Clark Cup top scorer: Alexia Putellas (2022)
- Cup of Nations top scorer: Esther González (2023)
- Cyprus Cup Golden Glove: Lola Gallardo (2018)
- Grand Hotel Varna Tournament top scorer: Mar Prieto (1992, 1995)
- SheBelieves Cup best player: Alexia Putellas (2020)
- SheBelieves Cup top scorer: Lucía García and Alexia Putellas (2020)

== Competitive record ==
=== FIFA Women's World Cup ===
FIFA Women's World Cup record									Qualification record					
Year	Round	Position	Pld	W	D	L	GF	GA	Pld	W	D	L	GF	GA
(China) 1991	Did not qualify								1991 UEFA Women's Championship					
(Sweden) 1995	Did not qualify								UEFA Women's Euro 1995					
(United States) 1999	Did not qualify								6	0	2	4	5	10
(United States) 2003	Did not qualify								6	2	0	4	8	11
(China) 2007	Did not qualify								8	4	2	2	19	14
(Germany) 2011	Did not qualify								8	6	1	1	37	4
(Canada) 2015	Group stage	20th	3	0	1	2	2	4	10	9	1	0	42	2
(France) 2019	Round of 16	12th	4	1	1	2	4	4	8	8	0	0	25	2
(Australia) (New Zealand) 2023	Champions	1st	7	6	0	1	18	7	8	8	0	0	53	0
(Brazil) 2027	Qualified								6	5	0	1	21	3
(Costa Rica) (Jamaica) (Mexico) (United States) 2031	To be determined								To be determined					
(United Kingdom) 2035	To be determined								To be determined					
Total	1 title	4/10	14	7	2	5	24	15	61	43	6	12	210	46

=== Olympic Games ===
Olympic Games record
Year	Host	Round	Pos.	Pld.	W	D	L	GF	GA
1996	(United States) Atlanta	Did not qualify							
2000	(Australia) Sydney	Did not qualify							
2004	(Greece) Athens	Did not qualify							
2008	Beijing	Did not qualify							
2012	(United Kingdom) London	Did not qualify							
2016	(Brazil) Rio de Janeiro	Did not qualify							
2020	(Japan) Tokyo	Did not qualify							
2024	(France) Paris	Fourth place	4th	6	3	1	2	9	8
2028	(United States) Los Angeles	To be determined							
2032	(Australia) Brisbane	To be determined							
Total		0 Titles	1/8	6	3	1	2	9	8

=== UEFA Women's European Championship ===
UEFA Women's Championship record									Qualification record							
Year	Round	Position	Pld	W	D	L	GF	GA	Pld	W	D	L	GF	GA	P/R	Rnk
1984	Did not enter								Declined participation							
(Norway) 1987	Did not qualify								6	1	1	4	7	9	–	
(West Germany) 1989	Did not qualify								8	2	2	4	4	8	–	
(Denmark) 1991	Did not qualify								6	0	2	4	3	13	–	
(Italy) 1993	Did not qualify								4	1	1	2	2	6	–	
1995	Did not qualify								6	3	3	0	29	0	–	
(Norway) (Sweden) 1997	Semi-finals	3rd	4	1	1	2	3	4	6	1	2	3	8	15	–	
(Germany) 2001	Did not qualify								6	1	1	4	6	17	–	
(England) 2005	Did not qualify								8	2	1	5	10	10	–	
(Finland) 2009	Did not qualify								8	5	2	1	24	7	–	
(Sweden) 2013	Quarter-finals	7th	4	1	1	2	5	7	10	6	2	2	43	14	–	
(Netherlands) 2017	Quarter-finals	8th	4	1	1	2	2	3	8	8	0	0	40	2	–	
(England) 2022	Quarter-finals	6th	4	2	0	2	6	5	8	7	1	0	48	1	–	
(Switzerland) 2025	Runners-up	2nd	6	5	1	0	18	4	6	5	0	1	18	5	(Note: From Euro 2025 onwards a new qualifying format was introduced, linked to the Women's Nations League where teams are divided into leagues with promotion/relegation between the leagues at the end of each cycle.)	1st
(Germany) 2029	To be determined								To be determined							
Total	0 Titles	5/14	22	10	4	8	34	23	90	42	18	30	242	107	1st	

=== UEFA Women's Nations League ===
UEFA Women's Nations League record
League phase												Finals							
Season	LG	Grp	Pos	Pld	W	D	L	GF	GA	P/R	RK	Year	Pos	Pld	W	D	L	GF	GA
2023–24	A	4	1st	6	5	0	1	23	9	Same position	1st	(Europe) 2024	Champions	2	2	0	0	5	0
2025	A	3	1st	6	5	0	1	21	8	Same position	3rd	(Europe) 2025	Champions	4	3	1	0	8	0
Total				12	10	0	2	44	17	1st and 3rd		Total	2 Title	6	5	1	0	13	0

▲	Promoted at end of season
Same position	No movement at end of season
▼	Relegated at end of season
*	Participated in promotion/relegation play-offs

=== Other tournaments ===
Year	Tournament	Pos	Pld	W	D	L	GF	GA
1992	(Bulgaria) Grand Hotel Varna Tournament	4th	4	3	0	1	8	1
1993	(Catalonia) Torneig Internacional Ciutat de Tarragona	4th	2	0	1	1	2	3
1995	(Bulgaria) Grand Hotel Varna Tournament	3rd	5	2	1	2	9	12
1996	Women's Tournament Slovakia	4th	3	0	2	1	2	6
2005	(Canary Islands) Torneo Internacional de Maspalomas	2nd	2	0	2	0	2	2
2017	(Portugal) Algarve Cup	1st	4	3	1	0	6	1
2018	Cyprus Cup	1st	4	3	1	0	6	0
2019	(Portugal) Algarve Cup	7th	3	2	0	1	4	3
2020	(United States) SheBelieves Cup	2nd	3	2	0	1	4	2
2022	(England) Arnold Clark Cup	2nd	3	1	2	0	2	1
2023	(Australia) Cup of Nations	2nd	3	2	0	1	8	3

=== Overall official record ===
Competition	Stage	Result home, away	Opponent	Position	Scorers
1987 EC QS	Regular stage	1–2, 0–1	Hungary	3 / 4	Pubill
1987 EC QS	Regular stage	0–2, 0–3	Switzerland	3 / 4	Y. García, V. Hernández (2)
1987 EC QS	Regular stage	2–3, 1–1	Italy	3 / 4	Y. García, V. Hernández, Prieto
1989 EC QS	Regular stage	1–0, 1–1	Bulgaria	4 / 5	Artola, V. Hernández
1989 EC QS	Regular stage	0–2, 1–0	(Czech Republic) Czechoslovakia	4 / 5	
1989 EC QS	Regular stage	1–0, 1–0	Belgium	4 / 5	Artola
1989 EC QS	Regular stage	1–3, 0–0	France	4 / 5	Artola
1991 EC QS	Regular stage	0–0, 2–1	Switzerland	4 / 4	Parejo
1991 EC QS	Regular stage	1–3, 5–0	Denmark	4 / 4	Bakero
1991 EC QS	Regular stage	0–0, 3–1	Italy	4 / 4	Artola
1993 EC QS	Regular stage	0–4, 1–1	Sweden	2 / 3	Prieto
1993 EC QS	Regular stage	0–1, 0–1	Republic of Ireland	2 / 3	Bakero
1995 EC QS	Regular stage	0–0, 4–0	Belgium	2 / 4	Pascual (2), Bakero + 1 o.g.
1995 EC QS	Regular stage	0–0, 0–0	England	2 / 4	
1995 EC QS	Regular stage	17–0, 0–8	Slovenia	2 / 4	Prieto (9), Bakero (4), M. González (3), R. Castillo (2), B. García (2), Pascual (2), Sirgo (2) + 1 o.g.
1997 EC QS	Regular stage (Class A)	0–1, 2–0	Denmark	3 / 4	
1997 EC QS	Regular stage (Class A)	5–1, 2–2	Romania	3 / 4	Prieto (4), Cano, R. Castillo, Torras
1997 EC QS	Regular stage (Class A)	0–8, 1–1	Sweden	3 / 4	Prieto
1997 EC QS	Repechage	2–1, 1–1	England	1 / 2	Prieto (2), Mateos
(Norway) (Sweden) 1997 Euro	Group stage	1–1	France	2 / 4	Parejo
(Norway) (Sweden) 1997 Euro	Group stage	0–1	Sweden	2 / 4	
(Norway) (Sweden) 1997 Euro	Group stage	1–0	Russia	2 / 4	Parejo
(Norway) (Sweden) 1997 Euro	Semifinals	1–2	Italy	4 / 8	Parejo
1999 WC QS	Regular stage (Class A)	1–2, 2–1	Ukraine	4 / 4	Mateos, Torras
1999 WC QS	Regular stage (Class A)	1–2, 3–1	Sweden	4 / 4	Mateos, Prieto
1999 WC QS	Regular stage (Class A)	0–0, 1–1	Iceland	4 / 4	Prieto
1999 WC QS	Promotion	4–1, 0–3	Scotland	1 / 2	Monforte (2), Auxi, Cabezón, Gimbert, Marco, Mateos
2001 EC QS	Regular stage (Class A)	2–5, 7–0	Sweden	3 / 4	Mateos, Rodríguez
2001 EC QS	Regular stage (Class A)	1–2, 1–0	France	3 / 4	Mateos
2001 EC QS	Regular stage (Class A)	1–1, 1–2	Netherlands	3 / 4	Fuentes, Gimbert, Moreno
2001 EC QS	Repechage	1–6, 4–2	Denmark	2 / 2	Cabezón, Gimbert, Mateos
2003 WC QS	Regular stage (Class A)	6–1, 3–0	Iceland	4 / 4	Auxi (2), del Río (2), Ferreira, Gimbert
2003 WC QS	Regular stage (Class A)	2–1, 2–0	Russia	4 / 4	Auxi, del Río
2003 WC QS	Regular stage (Class A)	0–1, 3–0	Italy	4 / 4	
2003 WC QS	Promotion	Cancelled	Hungary	–	
2005 EC QS	Regular stage (Class A)	0–0, 0–1	Netherlands	3 / 5	Del Río
2005 EC QS	Regular stage (Class A)	0–2, 2–0	Norway	3 / 5	
2005 EC QS	Regular stage (Class A)	9–1, 2–0	Belgium	3 / 5	Del Río (5), Vázquez (2), Castillo, Gurrutxaga
2005 EC QS	Regular stage (Class A)	0–1, 2–0	Denmark	3 / 5	
2007 WC QS	Regular stage (Class A)	7–0, 3–2	Poland	3 / 5	Del Río (2)
2007 WC QS	Regular stage (Class A)	0–0, 0–1	Finland	3 / 5	Cabezón
2007 WC QS	Regular stage (Class A)	3–2, 2–4	Belgium	3 / 5	Adriana (2), Cabezón, Gimbert, Gurrutxaga, Del Río + 1 o.g.
2007 WC QS	Regular stage (Class A)	2–2, 5–0	Denmark	3 / 5	Adriana, Vilanova
2009 EC QS	Regular stage	6–1, 0–3	Belarus	2 / 5	Vázquez (3), Romero (2), Auxi, Azagra, Cuesta, Pérez
2009 EC QS	Regular stage	4–1, 2–2	Czech Republic	2 / 5	Boquete (2), Adriana, Gimbert, Torrejón, Vilanova
2009 EC QS	Regular stage	2–2, 1–0	England	2 / 5	Bermúdez, Boquete
2009 EC QS	Regular stage	4–0, 0–3	Northern Ireland	2 / 5	Vázquez (2), Bermúdez, Boquete, R. García, Del Río, Vilas
2009 EC QS	Repechage	0–2, 2–0	Netherlands	2 / 2	
2011 WC QS	Regular stage	9–0, 0–13	Malta	3 / 5	Adriana (8), Bermúdez (3), Boquete (3), Romero (3), Ibarra (2), Casado, Meseguer + 1 o.g.
2011 WC QS	Regular stage	2–0, 0–1	Austria	3 / 5	Adriana (2), Bermúdez
2011 WC QS	Regular stage	5–1, 0–5	Turkey	3 / 5	Adriana (5), Bermúdez (2), Boquete, Olabarrieta, Torrejón
2011 WC QS	Regular stage	2–2, 1–0	England	3 / 5	Adriana, Bermúdez
2013 EC QS	Regular stage	4–0, 1–10	Turkey	2 / 6	Adriana (4), Boquete (3), Bermúdez (2), Borja, Corredera, Olabarrieta, Vilas + 1 o.g.
2013 EC QS	Regular stage	3–2, 4–3	Switzerland	2 / 6	Adriana (2), Boquete (2), R. García, Vilas
2013 EC QS	Regular stage	13–0, 0–4	Kazakhstan	2 / 6	Vilas (7), Bermúdez (3), Boquete (2), Borja (2), Adriana, Meseguer, Torrejón
2013 EC QS	Regular stage	0–0, 0–4	Romania	2 / 6	Boquete (2), Adriana, Bermúdez
2013 EC QS	Regular stage	2–2, 5–0	Germany	2 / 6	Boquete, Romero
2013 EC QS	Repechage	3–2, 1–1	Scotland	1 / 2	Adriana (2), Boquete, Meseguer
(Sweden) 2013 Euro	Group stage	3–2	England	2 / 4	Boquete, Hermoso, Putellas
(Sweden) 2013 Euro	Group stage	0–1	France	2 / 4	
(Sweden) 2013 Euro	Group stage	1–1	Russia	2 / 4	Boquete
(Sweden) 2013 Euro	Quarter-finals	1–3	Norway	7 / 8	Hermoso
2015 WC QS	Regular stage	6–0, 0–5	Estonia	1 / 6	Natalia (3), Bermúdez (2), Vicky (2), Hermoso (2), Torrejón, Paredes
2015 WC QS	Regular stage	2–0, 0–0	Italy	1 / 6	Bermúdez, Natalia
2015 WC QS	Regular stage	1–0, 0–2	Romania	1 / 6	Natalia (2), R. García
2015 WC QS	Regular stage	3–2, 0–1	Czech Republic	1 / 6	Bermúdez (2), Boquete, Corredera
2015 WC QS	Regular stage	12–0, 0–10	(North Macedonia) Macedonia	1 / 6	Natalia (6), Bermúdez (5), Hermoso (5), Boquete (2), Calderón (2), Losada, Torrejón
(Canada) 2015 World Cup	Group stage	1–1	Costa Rica	4 / 4	Losada
(Canada) 2015 World Cup	Group stage	0–1	Brazil	4 / 4	
(Canada) 2015 World Cup	Group stage	1–2	South Korea	4 / 4	Boquete
2017 EC QS	Regular stage	5–0, 1–2	Finland	1 / 5	Paredes (2), Hermoso, Putellas, Sampedro, Torrecilla, Torrejón
2017 EC QS	Regular stage	3–0, 0–3	Republic of Ireland	1 / 5	Boquete (2), Hermoso (2), Losada, + 1 o.g.
2017 EC QS	Regular stage	2–0, 1–4	Portugal	1 / 5	Bermúdez, Boquete, Losada, Putellas, Sampedro, Torrecilla
2017 EC QS	Regular stage	13–0, 0–7	Montenegro	1 / 5	Boquete (5), Bermúdez (5), Losada (3), Putellas (2), Sampedro (2), Corredera, Hermoso, Torrecilla
(Netherlands) 2017 Euro	Group stage	2–0	Portugal	2 / 4	Losada, Sampedro
(Netherlands) 2017 Euro	Group stage	0–2	England	2 / 4	
(Netherlands) 2017 Euro	Group stage	0–1	Scotland	2 / 4	
(Netherlands) 2017 Euro	Quarter-finals	0–0	Austria	8 / 8	
2019 WC QS	Regular stage	2–0, 0–6	Israel	1 / 5	Hermoso (2), Paredes (2), Latorre, Putellas, Sampedro, Vilas
2019 WC QS	Regular stage	3–0, 1–2	Serbia	1 / 5	Hermoso (3), Guijarro, Sampedro
2019 WC QS	Regular stage	4–0, 0–1	Austria	1 / 5	Guijarro, Paredes, Putellas, Torrecilla
2019 WC QS	Regular stage	5–1, 0–2	Finland	1 / 5	Corredera (2), O. García, Hermoso, Nahikari, Paredes + 1 o.g.
(France) 2019 World Cup	Group stage	3–1	South Africa	2 / 4	Hermoso (2), L. García
(France) 2019 World Cup	Group stage	0–1	Germany	2 / 4	
(France) 2019 World Cup	Group stage	0–0	China	2 / 4	
(France) 2019 World Cup	Eighth-finals	1–2	United States	11 / 16	Hermoso
2021 EC QS	Regular stage	4–0, 0–13	Azerbaijan	1 / 5	González (5), Hermoso (5), Bonmatí (2), Caldentey, Eizagirre, Guijarro, Navarro, Torrecilla
2021 EC QS	Regular stage	4–0, 1–5	Czech Republic	1 / 5	Bonmatí (2), Caldentey, González, Guijarro, Hermoso, Paredes, Putellas + 1 o.g.
2021 EC QS	Regular stage	10–0, 0–9	Moldova	1 / 5	Caldentey (4), Hermoso (4), Bonmatí (2), L. García (2), Guijarro (2), Navarro, Putellas, Redondo + 2 o.g.
2021 EC QS	Regular stage	3–0, 0–0	Poland	1 / 5	González (2), León
(England) 2022 Euro	Group stage	4–1	Finland	2 / 4	Bonmatí, Caldentey, L. García, Paredes
(England) 2022 Euro	Group stage	0–2	Germany	2 / 4	
(England) 2022 Euro	Group stage	1–0	Denmark	2 / 4	Cardona
(England) 2022 Euro	Quarter-finals	1–2	England	6 / 8	González
2023 WC QS	Regular stage	12–0, 0–10	Faroe Islands	1 / 5	Sarriegi (5), Caldentey (4), González (4), Bonmatí (2), Putellas (2), Aleixandri, L. García, Guerrero, Guijarro, Redondo
2023 WC QS	Regular stage	3–0, 0–7	Hungary	1 / 5	Caldentey (2), González (2), Sarriegi (2), del Castillo
2023 WC QS	Regular stage	5–0, 0–6	Ukraine	1 / 5	Sarriegi (2), Eizagirre, Putellas, Redondo + 1 o.g.
2023 WC QS	Regular stage	8–0, 0–2	Scotland	1 / 5	Hermoso (3), Bonmatí (2), Caldentey (2), Sarriegi (2), Putellas
(Australia) (New Zealand) 2023 World Cup	Group stage	3–0	Costa Rica	2 / 4	Bonmatí, González + 1 o.g.
(Australia) (New Zealand) 2023 World Cup	Group stage	5–0	Zambia	2 / 4	Hermoso (2), Redondo (2), Abelleira
(Australia) (New Zealand) 2023 World Cup	Group stage	0–4	Japan	2 / 4	
(Australia) (New Zealand) 2023 World Cup	Eighth-finals	5–1	Switzerland	1/16	Bonmatí (2), Codina, Hermoso, Redondo
(Australia) (New Zealand) 2023 World Cup	Quarter-final	2–1	Netherlands	1/16	Caldentey, Paralluelo
(Australia) (New Zealand) 2023 World Cup	Semi-final	2–1	Sweden	1/16	Carmona, Paralluelo
(Australia) (New Zealand) 2023 World Cup	Final	1–0	England	1/16	Carmona
2023–24 NL	League A	5–3, 2–3	Sweden	1 / 4	Caldentey (3), del Castillo (2), Benítez, Navarro, Paralluelo
2023–24 NL	League A	5–0, 1–7	Switzerland	1 / 4	Bonmatí (2), del Castillo (2), Oroz (2), Putellas (2), Gabarro, L. García, Hernández, Méndez
2023–24 NL	League A	2–3, 0–1	Italy	1 / 4	del Castillo, González, Hermoso
2023–24 NL	Semi-final	3–0	Netherlands	1 / 4	Batlle, Bonmatí, Hermoso
2023–24 NL	Final	2–0	France	1 / 4	Bonmatí, Caldentey
2025 EC QS	Regular stage	0–7, 2–0	Belgium	1 / 4	Paralluelo (3), González (2), Abelleira, Bonmatí, S. García, Hermoso
2025 EC QS	Regular stage	3–1, 2–1	Czech Republic	1 / 4	Bonmatí, Caldentey, Hermoso, Méndez
2025 EC QS	Regular stage	0–2, 3–2	Denmark	1 / 4	Caldentey, L. García, Hermoso, Paredes, Vilamala
(France) 2024 Olympic Games	Group stage	2–1	Japan	1 / 4	Bonmatí, Caldentey
(France) 2024 Olympic Games	Group stage	1–0	Nigeria	1 / 4	Putellas
(France) 2024 Olympic Games	Group stage	2–0	Brazil	1 / 4	del Castillo, Putellas
(France) 2024 Olympic Games	Quarter-final	2–2 (4–2 p)	Colombia	4 / 8	Hermoso, Paredes
(France) 2024 Olympic Games	Semi-final	2–4	Brazil	4 / 8	Paralluelo + 1 o.g.
(France) 2024 Olympic Games	Bronze Medal match	0–1	Germany	4 / 8	
2025 NL	League A	3–2, 1–5	Belgium	1 / 4	del Castillo (2), González (2), L. García, Martín-Prieto, Pina, Redondo
2025 NL	League A	2–1, 1–0	England	1 / 4	Pina (2)
2025 NL	League A	7–1, 2–4	Portugal	1 / 4	Bonmatí (2), González (2), Putellas (2), Aleixandri, Caldentey, Guijarro, Paralluelo, Pina
2025 NL	Semi-final	4–0, 0–1	Sweden	1 / 4	Putellas (3), Pina
2025 NL	Final	0–0 , 3–0	Germany	1 / 4	Pina (2), López
(Switzerland) 2025 Euro	Group stage	5–0	Portugal	1 / 4	González (2), López, Martín-Prieto, Putellas
(Switzerland) 2025 Euro	Group stage	6–2	Belgium	1 / 4	Putellas (2), Caldentey, González, Paredes, Pina
(Switzerland) 2025 Euro	Group stage	3–1	Italy	1 / 4	del Castillo, Guijarro, González
(Switzerland) 2025 Euro	Quarter-finals	2–0	Switzerland	2 / 8	del Castillo, Pina
(Switzerland) 2025 Euro	Semi-finals	1–0	Germany	2 / 8	Bonmatí
(Switzerland) 2025 Euro	Final	1–1	England	2 / 8	Caldentey
2027 WC QS	League A	3–0, 1–6	Iceland	1 / 4	Pina (3), Imade (2), López (2), Bonmatí, Paralluelo
2027 WC QS	League A	5–0, 1–3	Ukraine	1 / 4	Imade (3), López (2), Corrales, Méndez, Navarro
2027 WC QS	League A	4–0 , 1–0	England	1 / 4	Putellas (2), Guijarro, Pina

== Rankings ==
FIFA Women's World Rankings

2003				2004				2005				2006				2007				2008				2009				2010				2011				2012				2013				2014				2015				2016				2017				2018				2019				2020				2021				2022				2023				2024				2025				2026	
22	19	20	20	20	21	21	20	20	20	20	20	20	20	20	20	20	20	20	20	21	19	19	20	20	20	20	20	20	20	19	19	18	18	18	17	17	16	17	18	18	18	17	15	15	16	16	15	14	19	18	14	15	14	14	14	13	13	17	13	12	12	12	12	13	13	13	13	13	13	13	13	13	12	10	9	7	8	6	7	7	6	2	1	1	1	3	2	2	2	1	1	1	1

Season	March	Jun / Jul	Aug / Sep	December
2003	22nd (1755)	19th (1767)	20th (1767)	20th (1765)
2004	20th (1771)	21st (1756)	21st (1756)	20th (1756)
2005	20th (1754)	20th (1756)	20th (1756)	20th (1778)
2006	20th (1778)	20th (1793)	20th (1778)	20th (1778)
2007	20th (1778)	20th (1802)	20th (1802)	20th (1805)
2008	21st (1805)	19th (1819)	19th (1819)	20th (1796)
2009	20th (1796)	20th (1796)	20th (1797)	20th (1813)
2010	20th (1813)	20th (1812)	19th (1816)	19th (1816)
2011	18th (1816)	18th (1816)	18th (1819)	17th (1841)
2012	17th (1842)	16th (1841)	17th (1831)	18th (1823)
2013	18th (1824)	18th (1823)	17th (1831)	15th (1849)
2014	15th (1844)	16th (1854)	16th (1865)	15th (1865)
2015	14th (1867)	19th (1815)	18th (1824)	14th (1854)
2016	15th (1852)	14th (1861)	14th (1861)	14th (1862)
2017	13th (1885)	13th (1885)	17th (1849)	13th (1869)
2018	12th (1886)	12th (1911)	12th (1916)	12th (1920)
2019	13th (1913)	13th (1899)	13th (1897)	13th (1900)
2020	13th (1915)	13th (1915)	13th (1915)	13th (1919)
2021	13th (1929.14)	12th (1935.87)	10th (1935.87)	9th (1959.16)
2022	7th (1980.28)	8th (1983.13)	6th (1997.74)	7th (2000.31)
2023	7th (1997.65)	6th (2002.28)	2nd (2051.84)	1st (2066.05)
2024	1st (2085.96)	1st (2099.89)	3rd (2021.09)	2nd (2028.65)
2025	2nd (2020.60)	2nd (2034.34)	1st (2066.786)	1st (2094.891)
2026	1st (2083.09)	1st (2105.36)	1st (2121.50)	

UEFA Women's National Team
Coefficient Ranking

Date	Rank	Points
9 March 2011	12th	32,679
25 October 2012	12th	32,999
17 September 2014	7th	35,941
8 June 2016	6th	37,363
21 September 2016	6th	37,655
28 November 2017	5th	39,340
13 June 2018	6th	39,139
4 September 2018	5th	39,181
8 July 2019	6th	22,335
24 February 2021	6th	38,913
6 September 2022	5th	40,472

Ziaian Women's Football
Rankings

Season	1996	1997	1998	1999	2000	2001	2002
Rank	15th	16th	16th	16th	28th	23rd	26th

Season	2003	2004	2005	2006	2007	2008	2009
Rank	24th	24th	24th	24th	24th	24th	22nd

Season	2010	2011	2012	2013	2014	2015	2016
Rank	23rd	15th	19th	18th	15th	14th	11th

Season	2017	2018	2019	2020	2021	2022	2023
Rank	8th	8th	10th	4th	1st	4th	1st

Season	2024	2025	2026
Rank	6th	1st	1st

== See also ==
Women's football in Spain

- List of Spain women's international footballers
- List of Spain women's national football team captains
- Spain women's national under-20 football team
- Spain women's national under-19 football team
- Spain women's national under-17 football team
- Spain women's national under-23 football team
- Spain women's national futsal team
- Spain women's national beach soccer team

== Notes ==
Sporting positions
Preceded by 2019 United States	World Champions; 2023 (first title)	Incumbent
