= 2020 SheBelieves Cup squads =

List of players competing at the 5th edition of the SheBelieves Cup

This article lists the squads for the 2020 SheBelieves Cup, the 5th edition of the SheBelieves Cup. The cup consisted of a series of friendly games, and was held in the United States from 5 to 11 March 2020. The four national teams involved in the tournament registered a squad of 23 players.

The age listed for each player is on 5 March 2020, the first day of the tournament. The numbers of caps and goals listed for each player do not include any matches played after the start of tournament. The club listed is the club for which the player last played a competitive match prior to the tournament. The nationality for each club reflects the national association (not the league) to which the club is affiliated. A flag is included for coaches that are of a different nationality than their own national team.

== Squads ==
=== England ===
Coach: Phil Neville

The final squad was announced on 18 February 2020. On 26 February 2020, Lucy Bronze withdrew due to calf injury and was replaced by Alessia Russo.

No.	Pos.	Player	Date of birth (age)	Caps	Goals	Club
1	GK	Carly Telford	7 July 1987 (aged 32)	24	0	(The Football Association) Chelsea
2	DF	Rachel Daly	6 December 1991 (aged 28)	33	3	(United States Soccer Federation) Houston Dash
3	DF	Alex Greenwood	7 September 1993 (aged 26)	44	3	(French Football Federation) Lyon
4	MF	Keira Walsh	8 April 1997 (aged 22)	26	0	(The Football Association) Manchester City
5	DF	Steph Houghton (captain)	23 April 1988 (aged 31)	117	13	(The Football Association) Manchester City
6	DF	Millie Bright	21 August 1993 (aged 26)	34	0	(The Football Association) Chelsea
7	FW	Nikita Parris	10 March 1994 (aged 25)	47	14	(French Football Federation) Lyon
8	MF	Jill Scott	2 February 1987 (aged 33)	149	25	(The Football Association) Manchester City
9	FW	Bethany England	3 June 1994 (aged 25)	5	2	(The Football Association) Chelsea
10	MF	Jordan Nobbs (vice-captain)	8 December 1992 (aged 27)	60	7	(The Football Association) Arsenal
11	FW	Toni Duggan	25 July 1991 (aged 28)	76	22	(Royal Spanish Football Federation) Atlético Madrid
12	FW	Demi Stokes	12 December 1991 (aged 28)	56	1	(The Football Association) Manchester City
13	GK	Ellie Roebuck	23 September 1999 (aged 20)	4	0	(The Football Association) Manchester City
14	DF	Leah Williamson	29 March 1997 (aged 22)	14	1	(The Football Association) Arsenal
15	DF	Abbie McManus	14 January 1993 (aged 27)	17	0	(The Football Association) Manchester United
16	MF	Georgia Stanway	3 January 1999 (aged 21)	16	2	(The Football Association) Manchester City
17	MF	Lucy Staniforth	2 October 1992 (aged 27)	15	2	(The Football Association) Birmingham City
18	FW	Ellen White	9 May 1989 (aged 30)	89	35	(The Football Association) Manchester City
19	FW	Alessia Russo	8 February 1999 (aged 21)	0	0	(United States Soccer Federation) North Carolina Tar Heels
20	FW	Lauren Hemp	7 August 2000 (aged 19)	3	0	(The Football Association) Manchester City
21	GK	Sandy MacIver	18 June 1998 (aged 21)	0	0	(The Football Association) Everton
22	FW	Chloe Kelly	15 January 1998 (aged 22)	1	0	(The Football Association) Everton
23	DF	Grace Fisk	5 January 1998 (aged 22)	0	0	(The Football Association) West Ham United

=== Japan ===
Coach: Asako Takakura

The squad was announced on 25 February 2020; Riko Ueki replaced Rikako Kobayashi due to injury on 1 March 2020.

No.	Pos.	Player	Date of birth (age)	Caps	Goals	Club
1	GK	Sakiko Ikeda	8 September 1992 (aged 27)	15	0	(Japan Football Association) Urawa Red Diamonds
2	DF	Risa Shimizu	15 June 1996 (aged 23)	31	0	(Japan Football Association) Nippon TV Beleza
3	DF	Shiori Miyake	13 October 1995 (aged 24)	21	0	(Japan Football Association) INAC Kobe Leonessa
4	DF	Saki Kumagai (captain)	17 October 1990 (aged 29)	110	1	(French Football Federation) Lyon
5	DF	Moeka Minami	7 December 1998 (aged 21)	10	0	(Japan Football Association) Urawa Red Diamonds
6	MF	Hina Sugita	31 January 1997 (aged 23)	15	0	(Japan Football Association) INAC Kobe Leonessa
7	MF	Emi Nakajima	27 September 1990 (aged 29)	78	14	(Japan Football Association) INAC Kobe Leonessa
8	FW	Mana Iwabuchi	18 March 1993 (aged 26)	69	27	(Japan Football Association) INAC Kobe Leonessa
9	FW	Yuika Sugasawa	5 October 1990 (aged 29)	69	20	(Japan Football Association) Urawa Red Diamonds
10	MF	Yuka Momiki	9 April 1996 (aged 23)	30	10	(Japan Football Association) Nippon TV Beleza
11	FW	Riko Ueki	30 July 1999 (aged 20)	3	0	(Japan Football Association) Nippon TV Beleza
12	MF	Hikaru Naomoto	3 March 1994 (aged 26)	20	0	(Japan Football Association) Urawa Red Diamonds
13	FW	Mayu Ikejiri	19 December 1996 (aged 23)	6	2	(Japan Football Association) Vegalta Sendai
14	MF	Yui Hasegawa	29 January 1997 (aged 23)	42	8	(Japan Football Association) Nippon TV Beleza
15	FW	Mina Tanaka	28 April 1994 (aged 25)	39	16	(Japan Football Association) INAC Kobe Leonessa
16	DF	Asato Miyagawa	24 February 1998 (aged 22)	9	0	(Japan Football Association) Nippon TV Beleza
17	MF	Narumi Miura	3 July 1997 (aged 22)	17	0	(Japan Football Association) Nippon TV Beleza
18	GK	Ayaka Yamashita	29 September 1995 (aged 24)	35	0	(Japan Football Association) Nippon TV Beleza
19	MF	Jun Endo	24 May 2000 (aged 19)	12	0	(Japan Football Association) Nippon TV Beleza
20	DF	Arisa Matsubara	1 May 1995 (aged 24)	4	1	(Japan Football Association) Nojima Stella
21	GK	Chika Hirao	31 December 1996 (aged 23)	2	0	(Japan Football Association) Albirex Niigata
22	DF	Mayo Doko	3 May 1996 (aged 23)	2	0	(Japan Football Association) Nippon TV Beleza
23	FW	Mami Ueno	27 September 1996 (aged 23)	6	0	(Japan Football Association) Ehime FC

=== Spain ===
Coach: Jorge Vilda

The final squad was announced on 24 February 2020. On 2 March 2020, Nahikari García was withdrawn due to a recurring foot injury and replaced with Alba Redondo.

No.	Pos.	Player	Date of birth (age)	Caps	Goals	Club
1	GK	Lola Gallardo	10 June 1993 (aged 26)	30	0	(Royal Spanish Football Federation) Atlético Madrid
2	DF	Ona Batlle	10 June 1999 (aged 20)	3	0	(Royal Spanish Football Federation) Levante
3	DF	Ainhoa Vicente	20 August 1995 (aged 24)	0	0	(Royal Spanish Football Federation) Athletic Bilbao
4	DF	Irene Paredes (captain)	4 July 1991 (aged 28)	71	9	(French Football Federation) Paris Saint-Germain
5	DF	Ivana Andrés	13 July 1994 (aged 25)	22	0	(Royal Spanish Football Federation) Levante
6	MF	Aitana Bonmatí	18 January 1998 (aged 22)	19	4	(Royal Spanish Football Federation) Barcelona
7	DF	Marta Corredera	8 August 1991 (aged 28)	75	5	(Royal Spanish Football Federation) Levante
8	FW	Mariona Caldentey	19 March 1996 (aged 23)	29	3	(Royal Spanish Football Federation) Barcelona
9	FW	Marta Cardona	26 May 1995 (aged 24)	2	0	(Royal Spanish Football Federation) Real Sociedad
10	FW	Jennifer Hermoso	9 May 1990 (aged 29)	75	32	(Royal Spanish Football Federation) Barcelona
11	MF	Alexia Putellas	4 February 1994 (aged 26)	74	12	(Royal Spanish Football Federation) Barcelona
12	MF	Patricia Guijarro	17 May 1998 (aged 21)	25	4	(Royal Spanish Football Federation) Barcelona
13	GK	Sandra Paños	4 November 1992 (aged 27)	37	0	(Royal Spanish Football Federation) Barcelona
14	MF	Virginia Torrecilla	4 September 1994 (aged 25)	62	7	(Royal Spanish Football Federation) Atlético Madrid
15	DF	Leila Ouahabi	22 March 1993 (aged 26)	33	1	(Royal Spanish Football Federation) Barcelona
16	DF	Mapi León	13 June 1995 (aged 24)	32	0	(Royal Spanish Football Federation) Barcelona
17	FW	Lucía García	14 July 1998 (aged 21)	20	1	(Royal Spanish Football Federation) Athletic Bilbao
18	MF	Ángela Sosa	16 January 1993 (aged 27)	5	0	(Royal Spanish Football Federation) Atlético Madrid
19	MF	Amanda Sampedro	26 June 1993 (aged 26)	50	11	(Royal Spanish Football Federation) Atlético Madrid
20	DF	Andrea Pereira	19 September 1993 (aged 26)	27	0	(Royal Spanish Football Federation) Barcelona
21	FW	Sheila García	15 March 1997 (aged 22)	1	0	(Royal Spanish Football Federation) Rayo Vallecano
22	FW	Alba Redondo	27 August 1996 (aged 23)	6	2	(Royal Spanish Football Federation) Levante
23	GK	María Asunción Quiñones	29 October 1996 (aged 23)	3	0	(Royal Spanish Football Federation) Real Sociedad

=== United States ===
Coach: (North Macedonia) Vlatko Andonovski

A 26-player preliminary squad was announced on 17 February 2020. The final squad was announced on 26 February 2020, with Jane Campbell, Jordan DiBiasi, and Margaret Purce not making the final squad.

No.	Pos.	Player	Date of birth (age)	Caps	Goals	Club
1	GK	Alyssa Naeher	April 20, 1988 (aged 31)	61	0	(United States Soccer Federation) Chicago Red Stars
2	FW	Mallory Pugh	April 29, 1998 (aged 21)	62	18	(United States Soccer Federation) Sky Blue
3	MF	Sam Mewis	October 9, 1992 (aged 27)	64	18	(United States Soccer Federation) North Carolina Courage
4	DF	Becky Sauerbrunn	June 6, 1985 (aged 34)	174	0	(United States Soccer Federation) Utah Royals
5	DF	Kelley O'Hara	August 4, 1988 (aged 31)	129	2	(United States Soccer Federation) Utah Royals
6	MF	Andi Sullivan	December 20, 1995 (aged 24)	16	0	(United States Soccer Federation) Washington Spirit
7	DF	Abby Dahlkemper	May 13, 1993 (aged 26)	58	0	(United States Soccer Federation) North Carolina Courage
8	MF	Julie Ertz	April 6, 1992 (aged 27)	99	19	(United States Soccer Federation) Chicago Red Stars
9	MF	Lindsey Horan	May 26, 1994 (aged 25)	83	18	(United States Soccer Federation) Portland Thorns
10	FW	Carli Lloyd (co-captain)	July 16, 1982 (aged 37)	291	122	(United States Soccer Federation) Sky Blue
11	DF	Ali Krieger	July 28, 1984 (aged 35)	107	1	(United States Soccer Federation) Orlando Pride
12	DF	Tierna Davidson	September 19, 1998 (aged 21)	25	1	(United States Soccer Federation) Chicago Red Stars
13	FW	Lynn Williams	May 21, 1993 (aged 26)	25	9	(United States Soccer Federation) North Carolina Courage
14	DF	Emily Sonnett	November 25, 1993 (aged 26)	44	0	(United States Soccer Federation) Orlando Pride
15	FW	Megan Rapinoe (co-captain)	July 5, 1985 (aged 34)	165	51	(United States Soccer Federation) Reign FC
16	MF	Rose Lavelle	May 14, 1995 (aged 24)	42	12	(United States Soccer Federation) Washington Spirit
17	FW	Tobin Heath	May 29, 1988 (aged 31)	165	33	(United States Soccer Federation) Portland Thorns
18	GK	Ashlyn Harris	October 19, 1985 (aged 34)	25	0	(United States Soccer Federation) Orlando Pride
19	DF	Crystal Dunn	July 3, 1992 (aged 27)	101	24	(United States Soccer Federation) North Carolina Courage
20	DF	Casey Short	August 23, 1990 (aged 29)	31	0	(United States Soccer Federation) Chicago Red Stars
21	GK	Adrianna Franch	November 12, 1990 (aged 29)	3	0	(United States Soccer Federation) Portland Thorns
22	FW	Jessica McDonald	February 28, 1988 (aged 32)	17	4	(United States Soccer Federation) North Carolina Courage
23	FW	Christen Press	December 29, 1988 (aged 31)	135	56	(United States Soccer Federation) Utah Royals

== Player representation ==
=== By club ===
Clubs with 3 or more players represented are listed.

Players	Club
9	(Japan) Nippon TV Beleza, (Spain) Barcelona
8	(England) Manchester City
5	(Japan) INAC Kobe Leonessa, (Spain) Atlético Madrid, (United States) North Carolina Courage
4	(Japan) Urawa Red Diamonds, (Spain) Levante, (United States) Chicago Red Stars
3	(England) Chelsea, (France) Lyon, (United States) Orlando Pride, (United States) Portland Thorns, (United States) Utah Royals

=== By club nationality ===
Players	Clubs
25	United States
23	Spain
22	Japan
18	England
4	France

=== By club federation ===
Players	Federation
45	UEFA
25	CONCACAF
22	AFC

=== By representatives of domestic league ===
National squad	Players
United States	23
Japan	22
Spain	22
England	18
