= 2022 Arnold Clark Cup squads =

List of players competing at the 1st edition of the Arnold Clark Cup

This article lists the squads for the 2022 Arnold Clark Cup, the inaugural edition of the Arnold Clark Cup. The cup consisted of a series of friendly games, and was held in England from 17 to 23 February 2022. The four national teams involved in the tournament could register a maximum of 25 players.

The age listed for each player is on 17 February 2022, the first day of the tournament. The numbers of caps and goals listed for each player do not include any matches played after the start of tournament. The club listed is the club for which the player last played a competitive match prior to the tournament. The nationality for each club reflects the national association (not the league) to which the club is affiliated. A flag is included for coaches that are of a different nationality than their own national team.

== Squads ==
=== Canada ===
Coach: (England) Bev Priestman

The 25-player squad was announced on 7 February 2022.

No.	Pos.	Player	Date of birth (age)	Caps	Goals	Club
2	DF	Allysha Chapman	25 January 1989 (aged 33)	86	1	(United States Soccer Federation) Houston Dash
3	DF	Kadeisha Buchanan	5 November 1995 (aged 26)	113	4	(French Football Federation) Lyon
4	DF	Shelina Zadorsky	24 October 1992 (aged 29)	77	2	(The Football Association) Tottenham Hotspur
5	MF	Quinn	11 August 1995 (aged 26)	73	5	(United States Soccer Federation) OL Reign
6	FW	Deanne Rose	3 March 1999 (aged 22)	65	10	(The Football Association) Reading
7	MF	Julia Grosso	29 August 2000 (aged 21)	31	0	(Italian Football Federation) Juventus
8	DF	Jayde Riviere	22 January 2001 (aged 21)	26	1	(United States Soccer Federation) Michigan Wolverines
9	FW	Jordyn Huitema	8 May 2001 (aged 20)	45	14	(French Football Federation) Paris Saint-Germain
10	MF	Ashley Lawrence	11 June 1995 (aged 26)	101	7	(French Football Federation) Paris Saint-Germain
11	MF	Desiree Scott	31 July 1987 (aged 34)	171	0	(United States Soccer Federation) Kansas City Current
13	MF	Sophie Schmidt	28 June 1988 (aged 33)	209	19	(United States Soccer Federation) Houston Dash
14	DF	Gabrielle Carle	12 October 1998 (aged 23)	28	1	(Swedish Football Association) Kristianstad
15	FW	Nichelle Prince	19 February 1995 (aged 26)	75	13	(United States Soccer Federation) Houston Dash
16	FW	Janine Beckie	20 August 1994 (aged 27)	83	33	(The Football Association) Manchester City
17	MF	Jessie Fleming	11 March 1998 (aged 23)	94	14	(The Football Association) Chelsea
18	GK	Kailen Sheridan	16 July 1995 (aged 26)	16	0	(United States Soccer Federation) San Diego Wave
20	FW	Tanya Boychuk	20 June 2000 (aged 21)	0	0	(United States Soccer Federation) Memphis Tigers
22	GK	Sabrina D'Angelo	11 May 1993 (aged 28)	8	0	(Swedish Football Association) Vittsjö
24	DF	Vanessa Gilles	11 March 1996 (aged 25)	14	0	(United States Soccer Federation) Angel City
25	MF	Marie-Yasmine Alidou	28 April 1995 (aged 26)	0	0	(Austrian Football Association) Sturm Graz
26	FW	Cloé Lacasse	7 July 1993 (aged 28)	2	0	(Portuguese Football Federation) Benfica
27	DF	Sura Yekka	4 January 1997 (aged 25)	15	0	(French Football Federation) Le Havre
29	MF	Victoria Pickett	12 August 1996 (aged 25)	2	0	(United States Soccer Federation) Kansas City Current
	GK	Erin McLeod	26 February 1983 (aged 38)	119	0	(United States Soccer Federation) Orlando Pride
	GK	Devon Kerr	7 March 1997 (aged 24)	0	0	(United States Soccer Federation) Washington Spirit

=== England ===
Coach: (Netherlands) Sarina Wiegman

The 24-player squad was announced on 8 February 2022. On 16 February, Lotte Wubben-Moy withdrew due to an injury and was not replaced.

No.	Pos.	Player	Date of birth (age)	Caps	Goals	Club
1	GK	Mary Earps	7 March 1993 (aged 28)	14	0	(The Football Association) Manchester United
2	DF	Rachel Daly	6 December 1991 (aged 30)	43	7	(United States Soccer Federation) Houston Dash
3	DF	Demi Stokes	12 December 1991 (aged 30)	64	1	(The Football Association) Manchester City
4	MF	Keira Walsh	8 April 1997 (aged 24)	34	0	(The Football Association) Manchester City
5	DF	Alex Greenwood	7 September 1993 (aged 28)	55	5	(The Football Association) Manchester City
6	DF	Millie Bright	21 August 1993 (aged 28)	45	3	(The Football Association) Chelsea
7	MF	Fran Kirby	29 June 1993 (aged 28)	51	14	(The Football Association) Chelsea
8	DF	Leah Williamson	29 March 1997 (aged 24)	24	2	(The Football Association) Arsenal
9	FW	Ellen White	9 May 1989 (aged 32)	101	48	(The Football Association) Manchester City
10	FW	Ella Toone	2 September 1999 (aged 22)	8	6	(The Football Association) Manchester United
11	FW	Lauren Hemp	7 August 2000 (aged 21)	14	4	(The Football Association) Manchester City
12	DF	Lucy Bronze	28 October 1991 (aged 30)	83	9	(The Football Association) Manchester City
13	GK	Hannah Hampton	16 November 2000 (aged 21)	0	0	(The Football Association) Aston Villa
14	MF	Georgia Stanway	3 January 1999 (aged 23)	26	4	(The Football Association) Manchester City
15	DF	Jess Carter	17 October 1997 (aged 24)	3	1	(The Football Association) Chelsea
16	FW	Beth Mead	9 May 1995 (aged 26)	32	16	(The Football Association) Arsenal
17	FW	Nikita Parris	10 March 1994 (aged 27)	57	15	(The Football Association) Arsenal
18	MF	Jordan Nobbs	8 December 1992 (aged 29)	67	8	(The Football Association) Arsenal
19	DF	Niamh Charles	21 June 1999 (aged 22)	2	0	(The Football Association) Chelsea
20	MF	Jill Scott	2 February 1987 (aged 35)	154	26	(The Football Association) Aston Villa
21	GK	Ellie Roebuck	23 September 1999 (aged 22)	7	0	(The Football Association) Manchester City
22	FW	Alessia Russo	8 February 1999 (aged 23)	2	3	(The Football Association) Manchester United
23	MF	Katie Zelem	20 January 1996 (aged 26)	1	0	(The Football Association) Manchester United

=== Germany ===
Coach: Martina Voss-Tecklenburg

The 25-player squad was announced on 8 February 2022. On 15 February, Svenja Huth, Tabea Waßmuth, Kathrin Hendrich and Sjoeke Nüsken were forced to withdraw from the squad after testing positive for COVID-19. Almuth Schult also withdrew as a close contact. Lena Lattwein withdrew due to a non-covid related illness. They were replaced by Chantal Hagel, Martina Tufekovic, Sarai Linder, Hasret Kayikçi, Ramona Petzelberger, and Leonie Maier.

No.	Pos.	Player	Date of birth (age)	Caps	Goals	Club
1	GK	Merle Frohms	28 January 1995 (aged 27)	22	0	(German Football Association) Eintracht Frankfurt
2	DF	Sophia Kleinherne	12 April 2000 (aged 21)	12	0	(German Football Association) Eintracht Frankfurt
3	DF	Leonie Maier	29 September 1992 (aged 29)	79	11	(The Football Association) Everton
4	DF	Maximiliane Rall	18 November 1993 (aged 28)	4	0	(German Football Association) Bayern Munich
6	DF	Lena Oberdorf	19 December 2001 (aged 20)	23	2	(German Football Association) VfL Wolfsburg
7	FW	Lea Schüller	12 November 1997 (aged 24)	34	23	(German Football Association) Bayern Munich
8	DF	Jana Feldkamp	15 March 1998 (aged 23)	8	0	(German Football Association) 1899 Hoffenheim
11	FW	Laura Freigang	1 February 1998 (aged 24)	10	9	(German Football Association) Eintracht Frankfurt
12	GK	Martina Tufekovic	16 July 1994 (aged 27)	0	0	(German Football Association) 1899 Hoffenheim
13	MF	Sara Däbritz	15 February 1995 (aged 27)	82	17	(French Football Federation) Paris Saint-Germain
14	FW	Hasret Kayikçi	6 November 1991 (aged 30)	11	6	(German Football Association) SC Freiburg
15	DF	Giulia Gwinn	2 July 1999 (aged 22)	21	3	(German Football Association) Bayern Munich
16	MF	Linda Dallmann	2 September 1994 (aged 27)	40	11	(German Football Association) Bayern Munich
17	DF	Felicitas Rauch	30 April 1996 (aged 25)	18	2	(German Football Association) VfL Wolfsburg
18	FW	Nicole Anyomi	10 February 2000 (aged 22)	2	0	(German Football Association) Eintracht Frankfurt
19	FW	Klara Bühl	7 December 2000 (aged 21)	19	8	(German Football Association) Bayern Munich
20	MF	Lina Magull	15 August 1994 (aged 27)	54	17	(German Football Association) Bayern Munich
21	GK	Ann-Katrin Berger	9 October 1990 (aged 31)	2	0	(The Football Association) Chelsea
22	MF	Jule Brand	16 October 2002 (aged 19)	10	4	(German Football Association) 1899 Hoffenheim
23	DF	Sara Doorsoun	17 November 1991 (aged 30)	35	1	(German Football Association) Eintracht Frankfurt
24	FW	Selina Cerci	31 May 2000 (aged 21)	0	0	(German Football Association) Turbine Potsdam
25	MF	Fabienne Dongus	11 May 1994 (aged 27)	2	0	(German Football Association) 1899 Hoffenheim
26	MF	Chantal Hagel	20 July 1998 (aged 23)	0	0	(German Football Association) 1899 Hoffenheim
	DF	Sarai Linder	26 October 1999 (aged 22)	0	0	(German Football Association) 1899 Hoffenheim
	MF	Ramona Petzelberger	13 November 1992 (aged 29)	0	0	(The Football Association) Aston Villa

=== Spain ===
Coach: Jorge Vilda

The 23-player squad was announced on 8 February 2022. On 14 February, Sheila García replaced Irene Paredes who withdrew due to a muscle injury. On 15 February, Claudia Zornoza withdrew from the squad after testing positive for COVID-19, and was replaced by Clàudia Pina. On 18 February, Athenea del Castillo replaced Mariona Caldentey who withdrew after picking up a hamstring injury in the first match against Germany.

No.	Pos.	Player	Date of birth (age)	Caps	Goals	Club
1	GK	Lola Gallardo	10 June 1993 (aged 28)	36	0	(Royal Spanish Football Federation) Atlético Madrid
2	DF	Ona Batlle	10 June 1999 (aged 22)	17	0	(The Football Association) Manchester United
3	DF	Laia Aleixandri	25 August 2000 (aged 21)	7	2	(Royal Spanish Football Federation) Atlético Madrid
4	DF	Sheila García	15 March 1997 (aged 24)	3	0	(Royal Spanish Football Federation) Atlético Madrid
5	DF	Ivana Andrés	13 July 1994 (aged 27)	30	0	(Royal Spanish Football Federation) Real Madrid
6	MF	Aitana Bonmatí	18 January 1998 (aged 24)	35	14	(Royal Spanish Football Federation) Barcelona
7	MF	Irene Guerrero	12 December 1996 (aged 25)	11	2	(Royal Spanish Football Federation) Levante
8	FW	Mariona Caldentey	19 March 1996 (aged 25)	46	17	(Royal Spanish Football Federation) Barcelona
8	FW	Athenea del Castillo	24 October 2000 (aged 21)	7	3	(Royal Spanish Football Federation) Real Madrid
9	FW	Esther González	8 December 1992 (aged 29)	16	14	(Royal Spanish Football Federation) Real Madrid
10	FW	Jennifer Hermoso	9 May 1990 (aged 31)	87	43	(Royal Spanish Football Federation) Barcelona
11	FW	Amaiur Sarriegi	13 December 2000 (aged 21)	7	12	(Royal Spanish Football Federation) Real Sociedad
12	MF	Patricia Guijarro	17 May 1998 (aged 23)	41	10	(Royal Spanish Football Federation) Barcelona
13	GK	Sandra Paños	4 November 1992 (aged 29)	47	0	(Royal Spanish Football Federation) Barcelona
14	MF	Alexia Putellas	4 February 1994 (aged 28)	93	23	(Royal Spanish Football Federation) Barcelona
15	DF	Leila Ouahabi	22 March 1993 (aged 28)	44	1	(Royal Spanish Football Federation) Barcelona
16	DF	Mapi León	13 June 1995 (aged 26)	44	1	(Royal Spanish Football Federation) Barcelona
17	FW	Lucía García	14 July 1998 (aged 23)	27	6	(Royal Spanish Football Federation) Athletic Club
18	MF	Marta Cardona	26 May 1995 (aged 26)	14	1	(Royal Spanish Football Federation) Real Madrid
19	DF	Olga Carmona	12 June 2000 (aged 21)	5	0	(Royal Spanish Football Federation) Real Madrid
20	DF	Andrea Pereira	19 September 1993 (aged 28)	38	0	(Royal Spanish Football Federation) Barcelona
21	MF	Nerea Eizagirre	4 January 2000 (aged 22)	9	2	(Royal Spanish Football Federation) Real Sociedad
22	FW	Clàudia Pina	12 August 2001 (aged 20)	2	0	(Royal Spanish Football Federation) Barcelona
23	GK	Misa Rodríguez	22 July 1999 (aged 22)	4	0	(Royal Spanish Football Federation) Real Madrid

== Player representation ==
=== Players ===
- Oldest (goalkeeper): (Canada) Erin McLeod (38 years, 356 days)
- Oldest (outfield): (England) Jill Scott (35 years, 15 days)
- Youngest (goalkeeper): (England) Hannah Hampton (21 years, 93 days)
- Youngest (outfield): (Germany) Jule Brand (19 years, 124 days)

=== By club ===
Clubs with 3 or more players represented are listed.

Players	Club
10	(Spain) Barcelona
9	(England) Manchester City
6	(England) Chelsea, (Germany) 1899 Hoffenheim, (Germany) Bayern Munich, (Spain) Real Madrid
5	(England) Manchester United, (Germany) Eintracht Frankfurt
4	(United States) Houston Dash, (England) Arsenal
3	(England) Aston Villa, (France) Paris Saint-Germain, (Spain) Atlético Madrid

=== By club nationality ===
Country	Total players	Outside national squad
England	30	8
Spain	23	0
Germany	21	0
United States	13	13
France	5	5
Sweden	2	2
Austria	1	1
Italy	1	1
Portugal	1	1

=== By club federation ===
Federation	Players
UEFA	84
CONCACAF	13
