= List of international goals scored by Jenni Hermoso =

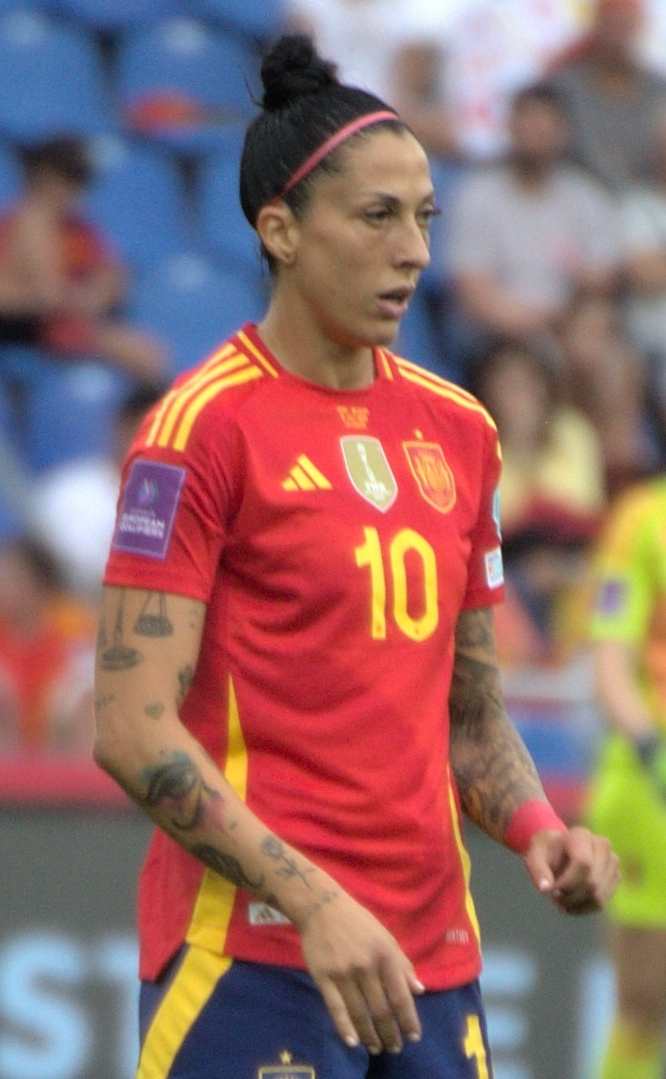
Jennifer Hermoso

Jenni Hermoso is a Spanish professional footballer who played for Spain between 2012 and 2025, and a prolific scorer that scored 57 international goals in 125 appearances, making her the country's record goalscorer.

Hermoso made her international debut for Spain on 21 June 2012 against Turkey in a 4–0 victory that allowed Spain to play in the playoffs of the UEFA Women's Euro 2013. She scored her first national team goal in a friendly against Russia in January 2013.

In addition to these goals, she also has 6 goals with the Spain XI in unofficial matches.

== International goals ==
Scores and results list Spain's goal tally first, score column indicates score after each Hermoso goal.

Table key
Indicates Spain won the match
Indicates the match ended in a draw
Indicates Spain lost the match

List of international goals scored by Jenni Hermoso
No.	Date	Venue	Opponent	Score	Result	Competition
1	16 January 2013	Pinatar Arena, Murcia, Spain	Russia	2–1	2–1	Friendly
2	12 July 2013	Linköping Arena, Linköping, Sweden	England	2–2	3–2	UEFA Women's Euro 2013
3	22 July 2013	Guldfågeln Arena, Kalmar, Sweden	Norway	1–3	1–3	UEFA Women's Euro 2013
4	27 October 2013	Ciudad Deportiva, Collado Villalba, Spain	Estonia	3–0	6–0	2015 FIFA Women's World Cup qualification
5	13 February 2014	Estadio Las Gaunas, Logroño, Spain	Macedonia	3–0	12–0	2015 FIFA Women's World Cup qualification
6	13 February 2014	Estadio Las Gaunas, Logroño, Spain	Macedonia	8–0	12–0	2015 FIFA Women's World Cup qualification
7	10 April 2014	FFM Training Centre, Skopje, Macedonia	Macedonia	5–0	10–0	2015 FIFA Women's World Cup qualification
8	10 April 2014	FFM Training Centre, Skopje, Macedonia	Macedonia	9–0	10–0	2015 FIFA Women's World Cup qualification
9	10 April 2014	FFM Training Centre, Skopje, Macedonia	Macedonia	10–0	10–0	2015 FIFA Women's World Cup qualification
10	8 May 2014	A. Le Coq Arena, Tallinn, Estonia	Estonia	5–0	5–0	2015 FIFA Women's World Cup qualification
11	8 April 2015	Mareo Stadium, Gijón, Spain	Republic of Ireland	1–0	1–0	Friendly
12	26 November 2015	Tallaght Stadium, Dublin, Ireland	Republic of Ireland	2–0	3–0	UEFA Women's Euro 2017 qualifying
13	24 January 2016	Stadion pod Malim brdom, Petrovac, Montenegro	Montenegro	5–0	7–0	UEFA Women's Euro 2017 qualifying
14	12 April 2016	La Ciudad del Fútbol, Las Rozas de Madrid, Spain	Republic of Ireland	3–0	3–0	UEFA Women's Euro 2017 qualifying
15	20 September 2016	Estadio Butarque, Leganés, Spain	Finland	5–0	5–0	UEFA Women's Euro 2017 qualifying
16	3 March 2017	Estádio Algarve, Algarve, Portugal	Norway	2–0	3–0	2017 Algarve Cup
17	8 April 2017	Pinatar Arena, Murcia, Spain	Belgium	3–1	4–1	Friendly
18	8 April 2017	Pinatar Arena, Murcia, Spain	Belgium	4–1	4–1	Friendly
19	23 October 2017	Ramat Gan Stadium, Ramat Gan, Israel	Israel	2–0	6–0	2019 FIFA Women's World Cup qualification
20	23 October 2017	Ramat Gan Stadium, Ramat Gan, Israel	Israel	5–0	6–0	2019 FIFA Women's World Cup qualification
21	24 November 2017	Voždovac Stadium, Belgrade, Serbia	Serbia	1–0	2–1	2019 FIFA Women's World Cup qualification
22	10 April 2018	BSFZ-Arena, Maria Enzersdorf, Austria	Austria	1–0	1–0	2019 FIFA Women's World Cup qualification
23	31 August 2018	El Sardinero, Santander, Spain	Finland	2–1	5–1	2019 FIFA Women's World Cup qualification
24	4 September 2018	Las Gaunas, Logroño, Spain	Serbia	1–0	3–0	2019 FIFA Women's World Cup qualification
25	4 September 2018	Las Gaunas, Logroño, Spain	Serbia	3–0	3–0	2019 FIFA Women's World Cup qualification
26	27 February 2019	Bela Vista Municipal Stadium, Parchal, Portugal	Netherlands	1–0	2–0	2019 Algarve Cup
27	27 February 2019	Bela Vista Municipal Stadium, Parchal, Portugal	Netherlands	2–0	2–0	2019 Algarve Cup
28	6 March 2019	Albufeira Municipal Stadium, Albufeira, Portugal	Switzerland	1–0	2–0	2019 Algarve Cup
29	2 June 2019	Stade Gerard Houllier, Le Touquet, France	Japan	1–1	1–1	Friendly
30	8 June 2019	Stade Océane, Le Havre, France	South Africa	1–1	3–1	2019 FIFA Women's World Cup
31	8 June 2019	Stade Océane, Le Havre, France	South Africa	2–1	3–1	2019 FIFA Women's World Cup
32	24 June 2019	Stade Auguste-Delaune, Reims, France	United States	1–1	1–2	2019 FIFA Women's World Cup
33	8 October 2019	Ďolíček, Prague, Czech Republic	Czech Republic	5–0	5–1	UEFA Women's Euro 2021 qualifying
34	19 September 2020	Zimbru Stadium, Chișinău, Moldova	Moldova	7–0	9–0	UEFA Women's Euro 2021 qualifying
35	27 November 2020	La Ciudad del Fútbol, Las Rozas de Madrid, Spain	Moldova	2–0	10–0	UEFA Women's Euro 2021 qualifying
36	27 November 2020	La Ciudad del Fútbol, Las Rozas de Madrid, Spain	Moldova	3–0	10–0	UEFA Women's Euro 2021 qualifying
37	27 November 2020	La Ciudad del Fútbol, Las Rozas de Madrid, Spain	Moldova	10–0	10–0	UEFA Women's Euro 2021 qualifying
38	18 February 2021	ASK Arena, Baku, Azerbaijan	Azerbaijan	5–0	13–0	UEFA Women's Euro 2021 qualifying
39	18 February 2021	ASK Arena, Baku, Azerbaijan	Azerbaijan	6–0	13–0	UEFA Women's Euro 2021 qualifying
40	18 February 2021	ASK Arena, Baku, Azerbaijan	Azerbaijan	8–0	13–0	UEFA Women's Euro 2021 qualifying
41	18 February 2021	ASK Arena, Baku, Azerbaijan	Azerbaijan	10–0	13–0	UEFA Women's Euro 2021 qualifying
42	18 February 2021	ASK Arena, Baku, Azerbaijan	Azerbaijan	13–0	13–0	UEFA Women's Euro 2021 qualifying
43	30 November 2021	Estadio de La Cartuja, Seville, Spain	Scotland	7–0	8–0	2023 FIFA Women's World Cup qualification
44	12 April 2022	Hampden Park, Glasgow, Scotland	Scotland	1–0	2–0	2023 FIFA Women's World Cup qualification
45	12 April 2022	Hampden Park, Glasgow, Scotland	Scotland	2–0	2–0	2023 FIFA Women's World Cup qualification
46	6 September 2022	La Ciudad del Fútbol, Las Rozas de Madrid, Spain	Ukraine	5–0	5–0	2023 FIFA Women's World Cup qualification
47	6 April 2023	Estadi Municipal de Can Misses, Ibiza, Spain	Norway	1–0	4–2	Friendly
48	6 April 2023	Estadi Municipal de Can Misses, Ibiza, Spain	Norway	2–1	4–2	Friendly
49	26 July 2023	Eden Park, Auckland, New Zealand	Zambia	2–0	5–0	2023 FIFA Women's World Cup
50	26 July 2023	Eden Park, Auckland, New Zealand	Zambia	4–0	5–0	2023 FIFA Women's World Cup
51	5 August 2023	Eden Park, Auckland, New Zealand	Switzerland	5–1	5–1	2023 FIFA Women's World Cup
52	27 October 2023	Stadio Arechi, Salerno, Italy	Italy	1–0	1–0	2023–24 UEFA Women's Nations League A
53	23 February 2024	Estadio de La Cartuja, Seville, Spain	Netherlands	1–0	3–0	2023–24 UEFA Women's Nations League A
54	5 April 2024	Den Dreef, Leuven, Belgium	Belgium	2–0	7–0	UEFA Women's Euro 2025 qualifying
55	9 April 2024	Estadio El Plantío, Burgos, Spain	Czech Republic	2–1	3–1	UEFA Women's Euro 2025 qualifying
56	31 May 2024	Vejle Stadion, Vejle, Denmark	Denmark	1–0	2–0	UEFA Women's Euro 2025 qualifying
57	3 August 2024	Stade de Lyon, Décines-Charpieu, France	Colombia	1–2	2–2 (a.e.t.) (4–2 p)	2024 Summer Olympics

== Statistics ==
Goals by year
Year	Spain	
Year	Apps	Goals
2012	4	0
2013	11	4
2014	7	6
2015	7	2
2016	8	3
2017	14	6
2018	10	4
2019	15	8
2020	5	4
2021	6	6
2022	6	3
2023	16	6
2024	14	5
2025	2	0
Total	125	57

Goals by competition
Competition	Goals
Olympics	1
FIFA World Cup	6
UEFA European Championship	2
FIFA World Cup qualification	18
UEFA European Championship qualification	17
UEFA Women's Nations League	2
Minor tournaments	4
Friendlies	7
Total	57

Goals by opponent
Opponent	Goals
Azerbaijan	5
Macedonia	5
Moldova	4
Norway	4
Belgium	3
Netherlands	3
Republic of Ireland	3
Scotland	3
Serbia	3
Czech Republic	2
Estonia	2
Finland	2
Israel	2
South Africa	2
Switzerland	2
Zambia	2
Austria	1
Colombia	1
Denmark	1
England	1
Italy	1
Japan	1
Montenegro	1
Russia	1
Ukraine	1
United States	1
Total	57

== See also ==
- List of women's footballers with 100 or more international caps
- Lists of hat-tricks
- List of international goals scored by Alexia Putellas
