= List of international goals scored by Alexia Putellas =

Alexia Putellas

Alexia Putellas is a Catalan professional footballer who played for Spain between 2013 and current, and a prolific midfielder that scored 43 international goals in 150 appearances to date (14 October 2026), in addition to one goal for the Catalan national team.

Putellas made her international debut for England on 21 June 2013 against Denmark in Vejle in a warm-up match for the UEFA Women's Euro 2013.

In addition to these goals, she also has 3 goals with the Spain XI in unofficial matches.

== International goals ==
Table key
Indicates Spain won the match
Indicates the match ended in a draw
Indicates Spain lost the match

Scores and results list Spain's goal tally first, score column indicates score after each Putellas goal.

List of international goals scored by Alexia Putellas
Spain goals
No.	Date	Venue	Opponent	Score	Result	Competition
1	12 July 2013	Linköping Arena, Linköping, Sweden	England	3–2	3–2	UEFA Women's Euro 2013
2	10 February 2015	Pinatar Arena, San Pedro del Pinatar, Spain	Austria	1–0	2–2	Friendly
3	27 October 2015	Sonera Stadium, Helsinki, Finland	Finland	1–0	2–1	UEFA Women's Euro 2017 qualifying
4	24 January 2016	Stadion pod Malim brdom, Petrovac, Montenegro	Montenegro	3–0	7–0	UEFA Women's Euro 2017 qualifying
5	8 April 2016	Complexo Desportivo da Covilhã, Covilhã, Portugal	Portugal	2–0	4–1	UEFA Women's Euro 2017 qualifying
6	15 September 2016	La Ciudad del Fútbol, Las Rozas de Madrid, Spain	Montenegro	12–0	13–0	UEFA Women's Euro 2017 qualifying
7	30 June 2017	Pinatar Arena, San Pedro del Pinatar, Spain	Belgium	1–0	7–0	Friendly
8	30 June 2017	Pinatar Arena, San Pedro del Pinatar, Spain	Belgium	3–0	7–0	Friendly
9	28 November 2017	Estadi de Son Moix, Palma, Spain	Austria	1–0	4–0	2019 FIFA Women's World Cup qualification
10	20 January 2018	Pinatar Arena, San Pedro del Pinatar, Spain	Netherlands	1–0	2–0	Friendly
11	5 March 2018	AEK Arena – Georgios Karapatakis, Larnaca, Cyprus	Czech Republic	2–0	2–0	2018 Cyprus Women's Cup
12	7 June 2018	La Condomina, Murcia, Spain	Israel	2–0	2–0	2019 FIFA Women's World Cup qualification
13	8 November 2018	Butarque, Leganés, Spain	Poland	2–1	3–1	Friendly
14	5 April 2019	Estadio Vicente Sanz, Don Benito, Spain	Brazil	1–1	2–1	Friendly
15	5 March 2020	Exploria Stadium, Orlando, United States	Japan	1–0	3–1	2020 SheBelieves Cup
16	11 March 2020	Toyota Stadium, Frisco, United States	England	1–0	1–0	2020 SheBelieves Cup
17	23 October 2020	La Cartuja, Seville, Spain	Czech Republic	4–0	4–0	UEFA Women's Euro 2022 qualifying
18	27 November 2020	La Ciudad del Fútbol, Las Rozas de Madrid, Spain	Moldova	7–0	10–0	UEFA Women's Euro 2022 qualifying
19	10 June 2021	Santo Domingo, Alcorcón, Spain	Belgium	2–0	3–0	Friendly
20	16 September 2021	Tórsvøllur, Tórshavn, Faroe Islands	Faroe Islands	4–0	10–0	2023 FIFA Women's World Cup qualification
21	26 October 2021	Kolos Stadium, Kovalivka, Ukraine	Ukraine	1–0	6–0	2023 FIFA Women's World Cup qualification
22	25 November 2021	La Cartuja, Seville, Spain	Faroe Islands	11–0	12–0	2023 FIFA Women's World Cup qualification
23	30 November 2021	La Cartuja, Seville, Spain	Scotland	6–0	8–0	2023 FIFA Women's World Cup qualification
24	17 February 2022	Riverside Stadium, Middlesbrough, England	Germany	1–0	1–1	2022 Arnold Clark Cup
25	23 February 2022	Molineux Stadium, Wolverhampton, England	Canada	1–0	1–0	2022 Arnold Clark Cup
26	7 April 2022	José Rico Pérez, Alicante, Spain	Brazil	1–0	1–1	Friendly
27	1 July 2022	Stadio Teofilo Patini, Castel di Sangro, Italy	Italy	1–1	1–1	Friendly
28	29 June 2023	Estadio Román Suárez Puerta, Avilés, Spain	Panama	2–0	7–0	Friendly
29	31 October 2023	Letzigrund, Zürich, Switzerland	Switzerland	2–0	7–1	2023–24 UEFA Women's Nations League
30	31 October 2023	Letzigrund, Zürich, Switzerland	Switzerland	4–0	7–1	2023–24 UEFA Women's Nations League
31	28 July 2024	Stade de la Beaujoire, Nantes, France	Nigeria	1–0	1–0	2024 Summer Olympics
32	31 July 2024	Nouveau Stade de Bordeaux, Bordeaux, France	Brazil	2–0	2–0	2024 Summer Olympics
33	8 April 2025	Balaídos, Vigo, Spain	Portugal	4–0	7–1	2025 UEFA Women's Nations League
34	8 April 2025	Balaídos, Vigo, Spain	Portugal	6–0	7–1	2025 UEFA Women's Nations League
35	3 July 2025	Stadion Wankdorf, Bern, Switzerland	Portugal	3–0	5–0	UEFA Women's Euro 2025
36	7 July 2025	Arena Thun, Thun, Switzerland	Belgium	1–0	6–2	UEFA Women's Euro 2025
37	7 July 2025	Arena Thun, Thun, Switzerland	Belgium	6–2	6–2	UEFA Women's Euro 2025
38	24 October 2025	La Rosaleda, Málaga, Spain	Sweden	1–0	4–0	2025 UEFA Women's Nations League Finals
39	24 October 2025	La Rosaleda, Málaga, Spain	Sweden	3–0	4–0	2025 UEFA Women's Nations League Finals
40	28 October 2025	Gamla Ullevi, Gothenburg, Sweden	Sweden	1–0	1–0	2025 UEFA Women's Nations League Finals
41	5 June 2026	Estadi Mallorca Son Moix, Palma de Mallorca, Spain	England	2–0	4–0	2027 FIFA World Cup qualification
42	5 June 2026	Estadi Mallorca Son Moix, Palma de Mallorca, Spain	England	3–0	4–0	2027 FIFA World Cup qualification
43	13 October 2026	Subaru Park Chester, United States	United States	0–1	2–2	Friendly
Catalonia goals
1	22 December 2016	Estadio da Lomba, Vilagarcía de Arousa	(Galicia (Spain)) Galicia	2–0	5–0	Unofficial match

== Statics ==
Appearances and goals by national team and year
Year	Spain		Catalonia	
Year	Apps	Goals	Apps	Goals
2013	8	1	—N/a	
2014	7	0	1	0
2015	12	2	1	0
2016	9	3	1	1
2017	14	3	0	0
2018	9	4	—N/a	
2019	16	1	0	0
2020	6	4	—N/a	
2021	12	5	—N/a	
2022	7	4	—N/a	
2023	13	3	—N/a	
2024	15	2	0	0
2025	14	8	—N/a	
2026	8	3	—N/a	
Total	150	43	3	1

Goals by competition
Competition	Goals
Olympics	2
FIFA World Cup	0
UEFA European Championship	4
FIFA World Cup qualification	8
UEFA European Championship qualification	6
UEFA Women's Nations League	7
Minor tournaments	5
Friendlies	12
Unofficial matches	1
Total	44

Goals by opponent
Opponent	Goals
Belgium	5
England	4
Portugal	4
Brazil	3
Sweden	3
Austria	2
Czech Republic	2
Faroe Islands	2
Montenegro	2
Switzerland	2
Canada	1
Finland	1
Galicia	1
Germany	1
Israel	1
Italy	1
Japan	1
Moldova	1
Netherlands	1
Nigeria	1
Panama	1
Poland	1
Scotland	1
Ukraine	1
United States	1
Total	44

== See also ==
- List of women's footballers with 100 or more international caps
- List of international goals scored by Jenni Hermoso
