= Teodoro Nieto =

Spanish football manager (born 1939)

Personal information
- Full name: Teodoro Nieto López
- Date of birth: 8 September 1939 (age 87)
- Place of birth: Madrid, Spain

Managerial career
- Years: Team
- 1983–1988: Spain

Teodoro Nieto (born 8 September 1939) is a Spanish football coach, who is the first head coach of the Spain women's national football team – a position he held from 1983 to 1988.
