= Marta Cardona =

Spanish footballer (born 1995)

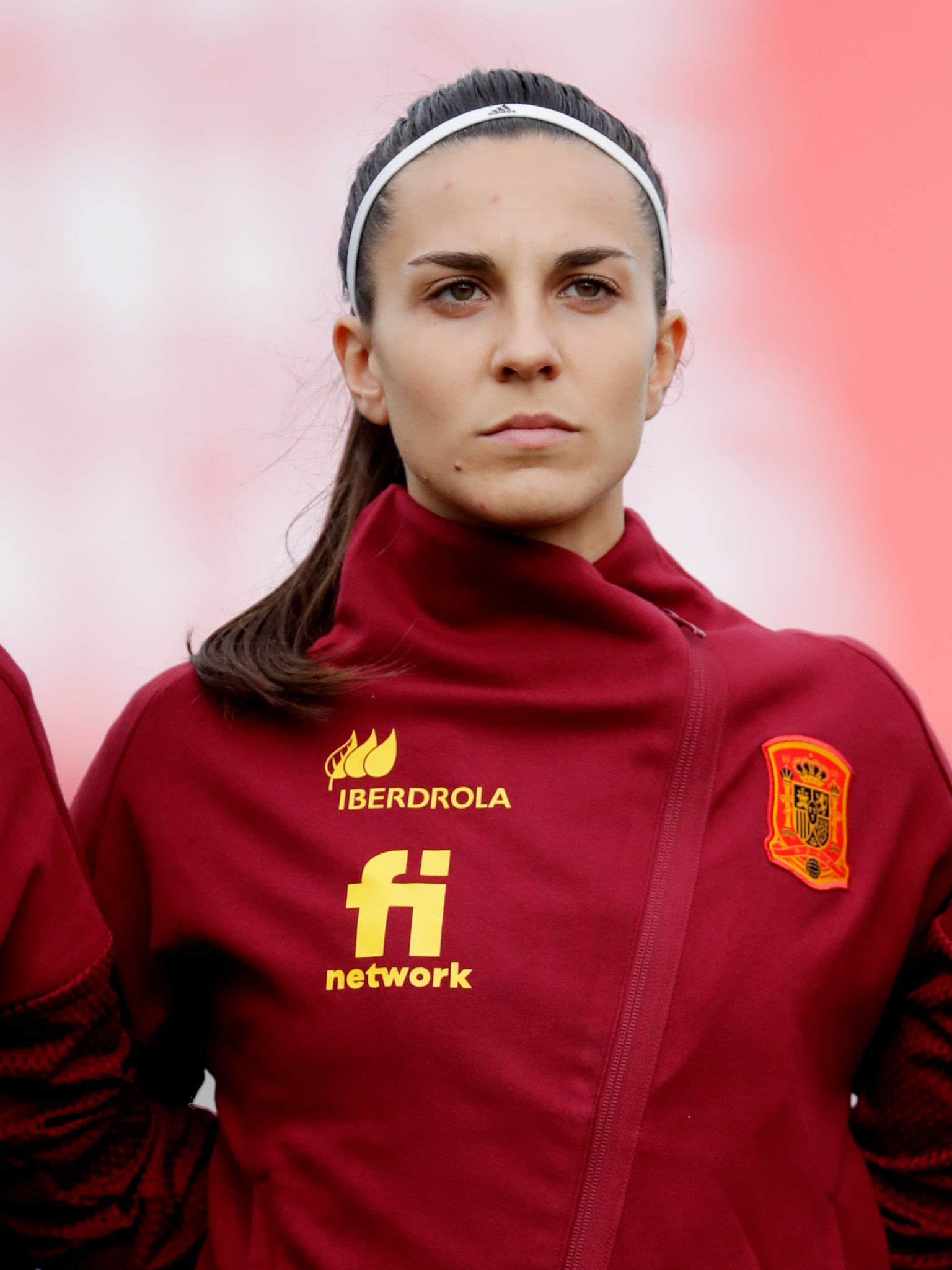
- Cardona representing Spain

Personal information
- Full name: Marta Cardona de Miguel
- Date of birth: 26 May 1995 (age 31)
- Place of birth: Zaragoza, Spain
- Height: 1.60 m (5 ft 3 in)
- Position: Right winger

Team information
- Current team: Zaragoza CFF

Senior career*
Years	Team	Apps	(Gls)
2010–2013	Zaragoza CFF B		
2011–2017	Zaragoza CFF	137	(18)
2017–2018	Levante	27	(0)
2018–2020	Real Sociedad	45	(4)
2020–2022	Real Madrid	40	(15)
2022–2025	Atlético Madrid	55	(6)
2025–2026	Parma	7	(0)
2026–	Zaragoza CFF	0	(0)

International career^{‡}
2019–	Spain	30	(3)
- * Club domestic league appearances and goals as of 10 May 2026 ‡ National team caps and goals as of 22:55, 21 November 2022 (UTC)

Marta Cardona de Miguel (born 26 May 1995) is a Spanish professional footballer who plays as a right winger for Spanish club Zaragoza CFF and the Spain women's national team.

== Club career ==
Cardona started her career at Zaragoza CFF. She left the team of her city in 2018 for signing with Levante, where she rested one season before agreeing terms with Real Sociedad.

Cardona moved to Real Madrid in the summer of 2020 following the end of her contract with Real Sociedad. In her first season with the capital club she was widely recognised as the most impactful attacker on the team. Her efforts saw her awarded by Spanish daily Marca at the end of the season.

Cardona suffered a series of injuries while at Real Madrid, causing her to consider retirement before she left the club to join Atlético Madrid Femenino in 2022.

== International career ==
Cardona made her senior debut for Spain on 4 October 2019 in a UEFA Women's Euro 2021 qualifying Group D match against Azerbaijan. She scored the goal in Spain's 1–0 victory against Denmark in the UEFA Women's Euro 2022 group stage.

== International goals ==
Date	No.	Venue	Opponent	Score	Result	Competition
13 April 2021	1.	Estadio Municipal de Marbella, Marbella, Spain	Mexico	1–0	3–0	Friendly
16 July 2022	2.	Brentford community stadium, Brentford, United Kingdom	Denmark	1–0	1-0	UEFA Women's Euro 2022
11 October 2022	3.	Estadio Nuevo Arcángel, Córdoba	Sweden	1–0	1–1	Friendly
